= Margaret Court career statistics =

Main career statistics of Australian former tennis player

This is a list of the main career statistics of Australian former tennis player Margaret Court. She won 64 Grand Slam events (24 singles, 19 doubles, 21 mixed doubles), which is a record for a male or female player. Her 24 Grand Slam singles titles and 21 in mixed doubles are also all-time records for both sexes. She achieved a career Grand Slam in singles, doubles, and mixed doubles. She is one of three women to have achieved the calendar year Grand Slam in singles (alongside Steffi Graf and Maureen Connolly), and is the only woman to have achieved the mixed doubles Grand Slam, which she did twice.

Court won more than half of the Grand Slam singles tournaments she played (24 of 47). She won 192 singles titles before and after the Open Era, an all-time record. Her career singles win-loss record was 1,177–106, for a winning percentage of 91.74 percent on all surfaces (hard, clay, grass, carpet), is also an all-time record. She won at least 100 singles matches in 1965 (113–8), 1968 (107–12), 1969 (104–6), 1970 (110–6), and 1973 (108–6). She won more than 80 percent of her singles matches against top 10 players (297–73) and was the year-end top ranked player seven times.

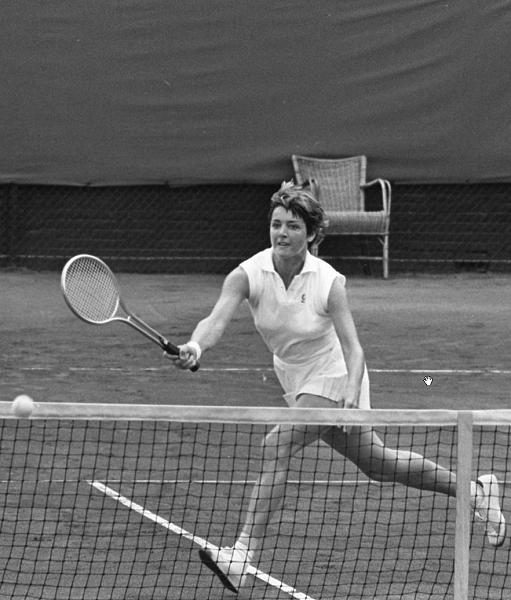
Margaret Court volleying

== Grand Slam performance timeline ==
Key
| W | F | SF | QF | #R | RR | Q# | DNQ | A | NH |

(W) winner; (F) finalist; (SF) semifinalist; (QF) quarterfinalist; (#R) rounds 4, 3, 2, 1; (RR) round-robin stage; (Q#) qualification round; (DNQ) did not qualify; (A) absent; (NH) not held; (SR) strike rate (events won / competed); (W–L) win–loss record.

=== Singles ===
| Tournament | 1959 | 1960 | 1961 | 1962 | 1963 | 1964 | 1965 | 1966 | 1967 | 1968 | 1969 | 1970 | 1971 | 1972 | 1973 | 1974 | 1975 | SR | W–L |
|---|---|---|---|---|---|---|---|---|---|---|---|---|---|---|---|---|---|---|---|
| Australian Open | 2R | W | W | W | W | W | W | W | A | F | W | W | W | A | W | A | QF | 11 / 14 | 60–3 |
| French Open | A | A | QF | W | QF | W | F | SF | A | A | W | W | 3R | A | W | A | A | 5 / 10 | 44–5 |
| Wimbledon | A | A | QF | 2R | W | F | W | SF | A | QF | SF | W | F | A | SF | A | SF | 3 / 12 | 51–9 |
| US Open | A | A | SF | W | F | 4R | W | A | A | QF | W | W | A | SF | W | A | QF | 5 / 11 | 52–6 |
| Win–loss | 1–1 | 5–0 | 15–3 | 16–1 | 18–2 | 17–2 | 22–1 | 12–2 | 0–0 | 11–3 | 21–1 | 23–0 | 11–2 | 4–1 | 21–1 | 0–0 | 10–3 | 24 / 47 | 207–23 |

=== Doubles ===
| Tournament | 1959 | 1960 | 1961 | 1962 | 1963 | 1964 | 1965 | 1966 | 1967 | 1968 | 1969 | 1970 | 1971 | 1972 | 1973 | 1974 | 1975 | 1976 | SR |
|---|---|---|---|---|---|---|---|---|---|---|---|---|---|---|---|---|---|---|---|
| Australian Open | A | F | W | W | W | F | W | F | A | SF | W | W | W | A | W | A | F | QF | 8 / 14 |
| French Open | A | A | 3R | F | F | W | W | W | A | A | F | SF | SF | A | W | A | A | A | 4 / 10 |
| Wimbledon | A | A | F | SF | F | W | 3R | F | A | QF | W | QF | F | A | QF | A | QF | A | 2 / 12 |
| US Open | A | A | 2R | QF | W | F | A | A | A | W | F | W | A | F | W | A | W | A | 5 / 10 |

=== Mixed doubles ===
| Tournament | 1959 | 1960 | 1961 | 1962 | 1963 | 1964 | 1965 | 1966 | 1967 | 1968 | 1969 | 1970 | 1971 | 1972 | 1973 | 1974 | 1975 | SR |
|---|---|---|---|---|---|---|---|---|---|---|---|---|---|---|---|---|---|---|
| Australian Open | A | A | A | A | W | W | W | SF | A | F | W | NH | NH | NH | NH | NH | NH | 4 / 6 |
| French Open | A | A | SF | A | W | W | W | 3R | A | A | W | SF | 3R | A | A | A | A | 4 / 8 |
| Wimbledon | A | A | SF | A | W | F | W | W | A | W | SF | 2R | A | A | F | A | W | 5 / 10 |
| US Open | A | A | W | W | W | W | W | A | A | A | W | W | A | W | F | A | SF | 8 / 10 |
| SR | 0 / 0 | 0 / 0 | 1 / 3 | 1 / 1 | 4 / 4 | 3 / 4 | 4 / 4 | 1 / 3 | 0 / 0 | 1 / 2 | 3 / 4 | 1 / 3 | 0 / 1 | 1 / 1 | 0 / 2 | 0 / 0 | 1 / 2 | 21 / 34 |

Note: The shared mixed doubles titles at the Australian Championships/Open in 1965 and 1969 are not always counted in Court's Grand Slam win total because the finals were never played. The Australian Open does officially count them as joint victories. Otherwise, she would have 21 Grand Slam mixed doubles titles, which is reflected in the above table.

== Grand Slam finals ==
=== Singles: 29 finals (24 titles, 5 runner-ups) ===
| Result | Year | Championship | Surface | Opponent | Score |
|---|---|---|---|---|---|
| Win | 1960 | Australian Championships | Grass | (Australia) Jan Lehane | 7–5, 6–2 |
| Win | 1961 | Australian Championships (2) | Grass | (Australia) Jan Lehane | 6–1, 6–4 |
| Win | 1962 | Australian Championships (3) | Grass | (Australia) Jan Lehane | 6–0, 6–2 |
| Win | 1962 | French Championships | Clay | (Australia) Lesley Turner | 6–3, 3–6, 7–5 |
| Win | 1962 | US Championships | Grass | (United States) Darlene Hard | 9–7, 6–4 |
| Win | 1963 | Australian Championships (4) | Grass | (Australia) Jan Lehane | 6–2, 6–2 |
| Win | 1963 | Wimbledon | Grass | (United States) Billie Jean King | 6–3, 6–4 |
| Loss | 1963 | US Championships | Grass | (Brazil) Maria Bueno | 5–7, 4–6 |
| Win | 1964 | Australian Championships (5) | Grass | (Australia) Lesley Turner | 6–3, 6–2 |
| Loss | 1964 | Wimbledon | Grass | (Brazil) Maria Bueno | 4–6, 9–7, 3–6 |
| Win | 1964 | French Championships (2) | Clay | (Brazil) Maria Bueno | 5–7, 6–1, 6–2 |
| Win | 1965 | Australian Championships (6) | Grass | (Brazil) Maria Bueno | 5–7, 6–4, 5–2 ret. |
| Loss | 1965 | French Championships | Clay | (Australia) Lesley Turner | 3–6, 4–6 |
| Win | 1965 | Wimbledon (2) | Grass | (Brazil) Maria Bueno | 6–4, 7–5 |
| Win | 1965 | US Championships (2) | Grass | (United States) Billie Jean King | 8–6, 7–5 |
| Win | 1966 | Australian Championships (7) | Grass | (United States) Nancy Richey | walkover |
| Loss | 1968 | Australian Championships | Grass | (United States) Billie Jean King | 1–6, 2–6 |
↓ Open Era ↓
| Win | 1969 | Australian Open (8) | Grass | (United States) Billie Jean King | 6–4, 6–1 |
| Win | 1969 | French Open (3) | Clay | (United Kingdom) Ann Haydon-Jones | 6–1, 4–6, 6–3 |
| Win | 1969 | US Open (3) | Grass | (United States) Nancy Richey | 6–2, 6–2 |
| Win | 1970 | Australian Open (9) | Grass | (Australia) Kerry Melville | 6–1, 6–3 |
| Win | 1970 | French Open (4) | Clay | (West Germany) Helga Masthoff | 6–2, 6–4 |
| Win | 1970 | Wimbledon (3) | Grass | (United States) Billie Jean King | 14–12, 11–9 |
| Win | 1970 | US Open (4) | Grass | (United States) Rosemary Casals | 6–2, 2–6, 6–1 |
| Win | 1971 | Australian Open (10) | Grass | (Australia) Evonne Goolagong | 2–6, 7–6, 7–5 |
| Loss | 1971 | Wimbledon | Grass | (Australia) Evonne Goolagong | 4–6, 1–6 |
| Win | 1973 | Australian Open (11) | Grass | (Australia) Evonne Goolagong | 6–4, 7–5 |
| Win | 1973 | French Open (5) | Clay | (United States) Chris Evert | 6–7, 7–6, 6–4 |
| Win | 1973 | US Open (5) | Grass | (Australia) Evonne Goolagong | 7–6, 5–7, 6–2 |

=== Doubles: 33 finals (19 titles, 14 runner-ups) ===
| Result | Year | Championship | Surface | Partner | Opponents | Score |
|---|---|---|---|---|---|---|
| Loss | 1960 | Australian Championships | Grass | (Australia) Lorraine Coghlan | (Brazil) Maria Bueno (United States) Christine Truman | 6–2, 5–7, 6–2 |
| Win | 1961 | Australian Championships | Grass | (Australia) Mary Carter Reitano | (Australia) Mary Bevis Hawton (Australia) Jan Lehane O'Neill | 6–4, 3–6, 7–5 |
| Loss | 1961 | Wimbledon | Grass | (Australia) Jan Lehane O'Neill | (United States) Billie Jean Moffitt (United States) Karen Hantze Susman | 6–3, 6–4 |
| Win | 1962 | Australian Championships (2) | Grass | (Australia) Robyn Ebbern | (United States) Darlene Hard (Australia) Mary Carter Reitano | 6–4, 6–4 |
| Loss | 1962 | French Championships | Clay | (United States) Justina Bricka | (South Africa) Sandra Reynolds Price (South Africa) Renée Schuurman | 6–4, 6–4 |
| Win | 1963 | Australian Championships (3) | Grass | (Australia) Robyn Ebbern | (Australia) Jan Lehane O'Neill (Australia) Lesley Turner Bowrey | 6–1, 6–3 |
| Loss | 1963 | French Championships | Clay | (Australia) Robyn Ebbern | (United Kingdom) Ann Haydon-Jones (South Africa) Renée Schuurman | 7–5, 6–4 |
| Loss | 1963 | Wimbledon | Grass | (Australia) Robyn Ebbern | (Brazil) Maria Bueno (United States) Darlene Hard | 8–6, 9–7 |
| Win | 1963 | U.S. Championships | Grass | (Australia) Robyn Ebbern | (Brazil) Maria Bueno (United States) Darlene Hard | 4–6, 10–8, 6–3 |
| Loss | 1964 | Australian Championships | Grass | (Australia) Robyn Ebbern | (Australia) Judy Tegart Dalton (United States) Lesley Turner Bowrey | 6–4, 6–4 |
| Win | 1964 | French Championships | Clay | (Australia) Lesley Turner Bowrey | (Argentina) Norma Baylon (West Germany) Helga Schultze | 6–3, 6–1 |
| Win | 1964 | Wimbledon | Grass | (Australia) Lesley Turner Bowrey | (United States) Billie Jean Moffitt (United States) Karen Hantze Susman | 7–5, 6–2 |
| Loss | 1964 | U.S. Championships | Grass | (Australia) Lesley Turner Bowrey | (United States) Billie Jean Moffitt (United States) Karen Hantze Susman | 3–6, 6–2, 6–4 |
| Win | 1965 | Australian Championships (4) | Grass | (Australia) Lesley Turner Bowrey | (Australia) Robyn Ebbern (United States) Billie Jean Moffitt | 1–6, 6–2, 6–3 |
| Win | 1965 | French Championships (2) | Clay | (Australia) Lesley Turner Bowrey | (France) Françoise Dürr (France) Janine Lieffrig | 6–3, 6–1 |
| Loss | 1966 | Australian Championships | Grass | (Australia) Lesley Turner Bowrey | (United States) Carole Caldwell Graebner (United States) Nancy Richey | 6–4, 7–5 |
| Win | 1966 | French Championships (3) | Clay | (Australia) Judy Tegart Dalton | (Australia) Jill Blackman (Australia) Fay Toyne | 4–6, 6–1, 6–1 |
| Loss | 1966 | Wimbledon | Grass | (Australia) Judy Tegart Dalton | (Brazil) Maria Bueno (United States) Nancy Richey | 6–3, 4–6, 6–4 |
↓ Open Era ↓
| Win | 1968 | US Open (2) | Grass | (Brazil) Maria Bueno | (United States) Billie Jean King (United States) Rosemary Casals | 4–6, 9–7, 8–6 |
| Win | 1969 | Australian Open (5) | Grass | (Australia) Judy Tegart Dalton | (United States) Rosemary Casals (United States) Billie Jean King | 6–4, 6–4 |
| Loss | 1969 | French Open | Clay | (United States) Nancy Richey | (United Kingdom) Ann Haydon-Jones (France) Françoise Dürr | 6–0, 4–6, 7–5 |
| Win | 1969 | Wimbledon (2) | Grass | (Australia) Judy Tegart Dalton | (United States) Patti Hogan (United States) Peggy Michel | 9–7, 6–2 |
| Loss | 1969 | US Open | Grass | (United Kingdom) Virginia Wade | (France) Françoise Dürr (United States) Darlene Hard | 0–6, 6–4, 6–4 |
| Win | 1970 | Australian Open (6) | Grass | (Australia) Judy Tegart Dalton | (Australia) Karen Krantzcke (Australia) Kerry Melville | 6–1, 6–3 |
| Win | 1970 | US Open (3) | Grass | (Australia) Judy Tegart Dalton | (United States) Rosemary Casals (United Kingdom) Virginia Wade | 6–3, 6–4 |
| Win | 1971 | Australian Open (7) | Grass | (Australia) Evonne Goolagong Cawley | (Australia) Jill Emmerson (Australia) Lesley Hunt | 6–0, 6–0 |
| Loss | 1971 | Wimbledon | Grass | (Australia) Evonne Goolagong Cawley | (United States) Billie Jean King (United States) Rosemary Casals | 6–3, 6–2 |
| Loss | 1972 | US Open | Grass | (United Kingdom) Virginia Wade | (France) Françoise Dürr (Netherlands) Betty Stöve | 6–3, 1–6, 6–3 |
| Win | 1973 | Australian Open (8) | Grass | (United Kingdom) Virginia Wade | (Australia) Kerry Harris (Australia) Kerry Melville | 6–4, 6–4 |
| Win | 1973 | US Open (4) | Grass | (United Kingdom) Virginia Wade | (United States) Billie Jean King (United States) Rosemary Casals | 3–6, 6–3, 7–5 |
| Win | 1973 | French Open (4) | Clay | (United Kingdom) Virginia Wade | (France) Françoise Dürr (Netherlands) Betty Stöve | 6–2, 6–3 |
| Loss | 1975 | Australian Championships | Grass | (Soviet Union) Olga Morozova | (Australia) Evonne Goolagong Cawley (United States) Peggy Michel | 7–6, 7–6 |
| Win | 1975 | US Open (5) | Clay | (United Kingdom) Virginia Wade | (United States) Billie Jean King (United States) Rosemary Casals | 7–5, 2–6, 7–6 |

=== Mixed doubles: 25 finals (21 titles, 4 runner-ups) ===
| Result | Year | Championship | Surface | Partner | Opponents | Score |
|---|---|---|---|---|---|---|
| Win | 1961 | U.S. Championships | Grass | (Australia) Robert Mark | (United States) Dennis Ralston (United States) Darlene Hard | 3–6, 6–2, 6–4 |
| Win | 1962 | U.S. Championships (2) | Grass | (Australia) Fred Stolle | (United States) Frank Froehling (Australia) Lesley Turner Bowrey | 7–5, 6–2 |
| Win | 1963 | Australian Championships | Grass | (Australia) Ken Fletcher | (Australia) Fred Stolle (Australia) Lesley Turner Bowrey | 6–4, 6–4 |
| Win | 1963 | French Championships | Clay | (Australia) Ken Fletcher | (Australia) Fred Stolle (Australia) Lesley Turner Bowrey | 6–1, 6–2 |
| Win | 1963 | Wimbledon | Grass | (Australia) Ken Fletcher | (South Africa) Bob Hewitt (United States) Darlene Hard | 11–9, 6–4 |
| Win | 1963 | U.S. Championships (3) | Grass | (Australia) Ken Fletcher | (United States) Ed Rubinoff (United States) Judy Tegart Dalton | 3–6, 8–6, 6–2 |
| Win | 1964 | Australian Championships (2) | Grass | (Australia) Ken Fletcher | (United Kingdom) Mike Sangster (Australia) Jan Lehane O'Neill | 6–4, 6–4 |
| Win | 1964 | French Championships (2) | Clay | (Australia) Ken Fletcher | (Australia) Fred Stolle (Australia) Lesley Turner Bowrey | 6–3, 4–6, 8–6 |
| Loss | 1964 | Wimbledon | Grass | (Australia) Ken Fletcher | (Australia) Fred Stolle (Australia) Lesley Turner Bowrey | 6–4, 6–4 |
| Win | 1964 | U.S. Championships (4) | Grass | (Australia) John Newcombe | (United States) Ed Rubinoff (Australia) Judy Tegart | 10–8, 4–6, 6–3 |
| Win | 1965 | Australian Championships (3) | Grass | (Australia) John Newcombe | (Australia) Owen Davidson (Australia) Robyn Ebbern | shared, final not played |
| Win | 1965 | French Championships (3) | Clay | (Australia) Ken Fletcher | (Australia) John Newcombe (Brazil) Maria Bueno | 6–4, 6–4 |
| Win | 1965 | Wimbledon (2) | Grass | (Australia) Ken Fletcher | (Australia) Tony Roche (Australia) Judy Tegart | 12–10, 6–3 |
| Win | 1965 | U.S. Championships (5) | Grass | (Australia) Fred Stolle | (United States) Frank Froehling III (Australia) Judy Tegart | 6–2, 6–2 |
| Win | 1966 | Wimbledon (3) | Grass | (Australia) Ken Fletcher | (United States) Dennis Ralston (United States) Billie Jean King | 4–6, 6–3, 6–3 |
| Loss | 1968 | Australian Championships | Grass | (Australia) Allan Stone | (Australia) Dick Crealy (United States) Billie Jean King | walkover |
↓ Open Era ↓
| Win | 1968 | Wimbledon (4) | Grass | (Australia) Ken Fletcher | (Soviet Union) Alex Metreveli (Soviet Union) Olga Morozova | 6–1, 14–12 |
| Win | 1969 | Australian Open (4) | Grass | (United States) Marty Riessen | (Australia) Fred Stolle (United Kingdom) Ann Haydon-Jones | shared, final not played |
| Win | 1969 | French Championships (4) | Clay | (United States) Marty Riessen | (France) Jean Claude Barclay (France) Françoise Dürr | 6–3, 6–2 |
| Win | 1969 | US Open (6) | Grass | (United States) Marty Riessen | (United States) Dennis Ralston (United States) Françoise Dürr | 7–5, 6–3 |
| Win | 1970 | US Open (7) | Grass | (United States) Marty Riessen | (South Africa) Frew McMillan (Australia) Judy Tegart Dalton | 6–4, 6–4 |
| Loss | 1971 | Wimbledon | Grass | (United States) Marty Riessen | (Australia) Owen Davidson (United States) Billie Jean King | 3–6, 6–2, 15–13 |
| Win | 1972 | US Open (8) | Grass | (United States) Marty Riessen | (Romania) Ilie Năstase (United States) Rosemary Casals | 6–3, 7–5 |
| Loss | 1973 | US Open | Grass | (United States) Marty Riessen | (Australia) Owen Davidson (United States) Billie Jean King | 6–3, 3–6, 7–6 |
| Win | 1975 | Wimbledon (5) | Clay | (United States) Marty Riessen | (Australia) Allan Stone (Netherlands) Betty Stöve | 6–4, 7–5 |

== Win-Loss singles record in Grand Slam tournaments ==
Australian Championships / Open

Court's overall win-loss record at the Australian Championships/Australian Open was 61–3 (95.3%) in 14 years (1959–1966, 1968–1971, 1973, 1975). (Her win total includes one walkover but does not include any first round byes.) Her only losses were to Martina Navratilova in 1975, Billie Jean King in 1968, and Mary Carter Reitano in 1959.

French Championships / Open

Court's overall win-loss record at the French Championships/French Open was 47–5 (90.3%) in 10 years (1961–1966, 1969–1971, 1973). (Her win total includes three walkovers but does not include any first round byes.) Her only losses were to Gail Chanfreau in 1971, Nancy Richey in 1966, Lesley Turner Bowrey in 1965, Věra Pužejová Suková in 1963, and Ann Haydon-Jones in 1961.

US Championships / Open

Court's overall win-loss record at the United States Championships/United States Open was 51–6 (89.5%) in 11 years (1961–1965, 1968–1970, 1972–1973, 1975). (Her win total does not include any first round byes.) Her only losses were to Martina Navratilova in 1975, Billie Jean King in 1972, Maria Bueno in 1968 and 1963, Karen Hantze Susman in 1964, and Darlene Hard in 1961.

Wimbledon

Court's overall win-loss record at Wimbledon was 51–9 (85%) in 12 years (1961–1966, 1968–1971, 1973, 1975). (Her win total includes one mid-match retirement by her opponent, but does not include any first round byes.) Her only losses were to Evonne Goolagong Cawley in 1975 and 1971, Chris Evert in 1973, Ann Haydon-Jones in 1969, Judy Tegart Dalton in 1968, Billie Jean King in 1966 and 1962, Maria Bueno in 1964, and Christine Truman Janes in 1961.

== Career singles finals: 234 (192 titles, 42 runner-ups) ==
Margaret Court contested 234 known singles finals between April 1958 and February 1977 she won 192 of those finals, 92 titles came in the Open Era of tennis.

=== Titles (192) ===
(Incomplete roll)

| No | Date | Tournament | Location | Surface | Opponent | Score |
|---|---|---|---|---|---|---|
| 1 | 4-01-1958 | Albury Easter Tournament | Albury | Grass | (Australia) Margo Rayson | 9–7 6–4 |
| 2 | 04-10-1958 | Junee Open Tournament | Junee | Grass | (Australia) J Barker | 7–5 6–1 |
| 3 | 22-01-1960 | Australian Championships | Brisbane | Grass | (Australia) Jan Lehane | 7–5, 6–2 |
| 4 | 06-06–1960 | Victorian Hard Court Championships | Melbourne | Clay | (Australia) Beverley Rae | 6–3, 6–8, 6–3 |
| 3 | 19-10-1960 | Queensland Hard Court Championships | Brisbane | Clay | (Australia) Val Wicks | 4–6, 6–1, 6–1 |
| 4 | 28-10-1960 | Queensland Grass Court Championships | Brisbane | Grass | (Australia) Lesley Turner | 10–8, 6–1 |
| 5 | 05-01-1961 | South Australian Championships | Adelaide | Grass | (Australia) Jan Lehane | 6–3, 6–0 |
| 6 | 17-01-1961 | Australian Championships | Melbourne | Grass | (Australia) Jan Lehane | 6–1, 6–4 |
| 7 | 27-03-1961 | Faucigny Lucinge Cup | Monte Carlo | Clay | (United Kingdom) Elizabeth Starkie | 4–6, 6–1, 6–1 |
| 8 | 03-04-1961 | Nice International Championships | Nice | Clay | (France) Florence de la Courtie | 9–7, 6–4 |
| 9 | 10-04-1961 | Trophée Raquette d'Or | Aix-en-Provence | Clay | (United Kingdom) Elizabeth Starkie | 6–2, 6–4 |
| 10 | 17-04-1961 | Paris International Championships | Paris | Clay | (France) Florence de la Courtie | 6–1, 6–3 |
| 11 | 12-06–1961 | Kent Championships | Beckenham | Grass | (United Kingdom) Christine Truman | 6–3, 4–6, 8–6 |
| 12 | 19-06–1961 | London Grass Court Championships | London | Grass | (United States) Nancy Richey | 6–0, 4–6, 6–2 |
| 13 | 16–10-1961 | Australian Hard Court Championships | Rockdale | Clay | (Australia) Lesley Turner | 6–2, 0–6, 7–5 |
| 14 | 19-11-1961 | South Australian Championships | Adelaide | Grass | (United States) Darlene Hard | 6–4, 5–7, 6–4 |
| 15 | 26–11-1961 | Western Australian Championships | Perth | Grass | (United States) Darlene Hard | 6–3, 6–0 |
| 16 | 04-12-1961 | Victorian Championships | Melbourne | Grass | (United States) Darlene Hard | 6–3, 6–2 |
| 17 | 15-12-1961 | New South Wales Championships | Sydney | Grass | (United States) Darlene Hard | 6–2, 6–1 |
| 18 | 28-12-1961 | Manly Seaside Championships | Sydney | Grass | (Australia) Jan Lehane | 6–0, 6–3 |
| 19 | 15-01-1962 | Australian Championships | Sydney | Grass | (Australia) Jan Lehane | 6–0, 6–2 |
| 20 | 26-01-1962 | Tasmanian Championships | Hobart | Grass | (Australia) Robyn Ebbern | 7–5, 6–0 |
| 21 | 07-05-1962 | Italian International Championships | Rome | Clay | (Brazil) Maria Bueno | 8–6, 5–7, 6–4 |
| 22 | 14-05-1962 | Swiss International Championships | Lugano | Clay | (Australia) Lesley Turner | 6–2, 6–1 |
| 23 | 21-05-1962 | French International Championships | Paris | Clay | (Australia) Lesley Turner | 6–3, 3–6, 7–5 |
| 24 | 11-06–1962 | West of England Championships | Bristol | Grass | (Brazil) Maria Bueno | 6–1, 3–6, 6–2 |
| 25 | 24-07-1962 | Pennsylvania Grass Court Championships | Haverford | Grass | (United States) Karen Susman | 6–4, 10–8 |
| 26 | 31-07-1962 | Eastern Grass Court Championships | South Orange | Grass | (United States) Karen Susman | 6–3, 7–5 |
| 27 | 13-08-1962 | Essex County Club Invitational | Manchester | Grass | (Brazil) Maria Bueno | 6–1, 6–4 |
| 28 | 31-08-1962 | U.S. National Championships | Forest Hills | Grass | (United States) Darlene Hard | 9–7, 6–4 |
| 29 | 28-09-1962 | ACT Championships | Canberra | Grass | (Australia) Lesley Turner | 6–3, 4–6, 6–3 |
| 30 | 22-10-1962 | Queensland Grass Court Championships | Brisbane | Grass | (Australia) Jan Lehane | 6–3, 6–4 |
| 31 | 11-11-1962 | South Australian Championships | Adelaide | Grass | (United Kingdom) Christine Truman | 6–1, 6–2 |
| 32 | 22-11-1962 | New South Wales Championships | Sydney | Grass | (Australia) Lesley Turner | 8–6, 6–2 |
| 33 | 06–12-1962 | Victorian Championships | Melbourne | Grass | (Australia) Lesley Turner | 6–4, 8–6 |
| 34 | 09-01-1963 | Australian Championships | Adelaide | Grass | (Australia) Jan Lehane | 6–2, 6–2 |
| 35 | 07-05-1963 | Italian International Championships | Rome | Clay | (Australia) Lesley Turner | 6–3, 6–4 |
| 36 | 26-05-1963 | West Berlin International Championships | Berlin | Clay | (Australia) Robyn Ebbern | 6–2, 7–5 |
| 37 | 03-06–1963 | Count of Godo Cup | Barcelona | Clay | (Australia) Noelene Turner | 6–0, 6–0 |
| 38 | 10-06–1963 | Kent Championships | Beckenham | Grass | (Australia) Jan Lehane | 6–0, 6–1 |
| 39 | 24-06–1963 | Wimbledon Championships | Wimbledon | Grass | (United States) Billie-Jean Moffitt | 6–3, 6–4 |
| 40 | 09-07-1963 | Düsseldorf International | Düsseldorf | Clay | (Australia) Lesley Turner | 6–3, 6–2 |
| 41 | 29-07-1963 | Eastern Grass Court Championships | South Orange | Grass | (United States) Darlene Hard | 6–1, 6–1 |
| 42 | 12-08-1963 | Essex County Club Invitational | Manchester | Grass | (Brazil) Maria Bueno | 6–4, 11–9 |
| 43 | 13-10-1963 | Queensland Hard Court Championships | Brisbane | Clay | (Australia) Robyn Ebbern | 7–5, 6–2 |
| 44 | 28-10-1963 | Queensland Grass Court Championships | Brisbane | Grass | (Australia) Lesley Turner | 6–3, 6–2 |
| 45 | 10-11-1963 | New South Wales Championships | Sydney | Grass | (United States) Judy Tegart | 6–1, 6–3 |
| 46 | 18-11-1963 | South Australian Championships | Adelaide | Grass | (Australia) Jan Lehane | 6–3, 6–1 |
| 47 | 28-11-1963 | Victorian Championships | Melbourne | Grass | (Australia) Lesley Turner | 6–4, 6–4 |
| 48 | 26–12-1963 | Royal South Yarra Championships | Melbourne | Grass | (United States) Judy Tegart | 6–1, 6–0 |
| 49 | 13-01-1964 | Australian Championships | Brisbane | Grass | (Australia) Lesley Turner | 6–3, 6–2 |
| 50 | 03-02-1964 | Auckland Wills International | Auckland | Grass | (Australia) Jan Lehane | 6–4, 3–6, 6–0 |
| 51 | 27-03-1964 | Albury Easter Tournament | Albury | Grass | (Australia) Lesley Turner | 5–7, 6–3, 6–3 |
| 52 | 27-04-1964 | Reggio Calabria International | Reggio Calabria | Clay | (Australia) Robyn Ebbern | 6–0, 6–4 |
| 53 | 04-05-1964 | Italian International Championships | Rome | Clay | (Australia) Lesley Turner | 6–1, 6–1 |
| 54 | 13-05-1964 | West Berlin International Championships | Berlin | Clay | (West Germany) Helga Schultze | 6–2, 6–1 |
| 55 | 18-05-1964 | French International Championships | Paris | Clay | (Brazil) Maria Bueno | 5–7, 6–1, 6–2 |
| 56 | 01-06–1964 | Swiss International Championships | Lausanne | Clay | (Australia) Jan Lehane | 2–6, 8–6, 6–2 |
| 57 | 08-06–1964 | Kent Championships | Beckenham | Grass | (Brazil) Maria Bueno | 3–5 divided (rain) |
| 58 | 15-06–1964 | London Grass Court Championships | London | Grass | (United Kingdom) Ann Haydon Jones | 6–3, 6–3 |
| 59 | 08-07-1964 | Düsseldorf International | Düsseldorf | Clay | (Australia) Lesley Turner | 1–6, 6–1, 6–4 |
| 60 | 13-07-1964 | Gstaad International | Gstaad | Clay | (Australia) Lesley Turner | 6–4, 6–2 |
| 61 | 20-07-1964 | Dutch International Championships | Hilversum | Clay | (Brazil) Maria Bueno | 6–0, 1–6, 6–3 |
| 62 | 30-07-1964 | Hanover International | Hanover | Clay | (Austria) Sonja Pachta | 6–0, 6–1 |
| 63 | 03-08-1964 | German International Championships | Hamburg | Clay | (Brazil) Maria Bueno | 6–1, 6–4 |
| 64 | 03-10-1964 | Glen Iris Invitational | Glen Iris | Grass | (Australia) Kerry Melville | 6–1, 6–0 |
| 65 | 30-10-1964 | Queensland Hard Court Championships | Brisbane | Clay | (Australia) Robyn Ebbern | 6–3, 7–5 |
| 66 | 09-11-1964 | Queensland Grass Court Championships | Brisbane | Grass | (Australia) Lesley Turner | 11–9, 6–1 |
| 67 | 19-11-1964 | New South Wales Championships | Sydney | Grass | (United States) Billie Jean Moffitt | 6–4, 6–3 |
| 68 | 03-12-1964 | Victorian Championships | Melbourne | Grass | (Australia) Jill Blackman | 6–1, 6–3 |
| 69 | 05-01-1965 | Western Australian Championships | Perth | Grass | (Australia) Robyn Ebbern | 6–1, 6–1 |
| 70 | 22-01-1965 | Australian Championships | Melbourne | Grass | (Brazil) Maria Bueno | 5–7, 6–4, 5–2, retd. |
| 71 | 02-03-1965 | Good Neighbor Championships | Miami Beach | Clay | (Australia) Lesley Turner | 6–2, 8–6 |
| 72 | 22-03-1965 | Altamira International | Caracas | Hard | (Australia) Lesley Turner | 4–6, 6–2, 7–5 |
| 73 | 29-03-1965 | Pan-American Championships | Mexico City | Clay | (France) Monique Salfati | 6–4, 6–2 |
| 74 | 10-05-1965 | Atlanta Invitation | Atlanta | Clay | (Australia) Lesley Turner | default |
| 75 | 31-05-1965 | Northern Championships | Manchester | Grass | (Brazil) Maria Bueno | 6–1, 7–5 |
| 76 | 07-06–1965 | Kent Championships | Beckenham | Grass | (Brazil) Maria Bueno | 4–6, 6–3, 6–3 |
| 77 | 21-06–1965 | Wimbledon Championships | Wimbledon | Grass | (Brazil) Maria Bueno | 6–4, 7–5 |
| 78 | 05-07-1965 | Midland Counties Championships | Edgbaston | Grass | (United Kingdom) Virginia Wade | 6–3, 4–6, 7–5 |
| 79 | 12-07-1965 | Hoylake and West Kirby Open | Hoylake | Grass | (Australia) Judy Tegart | 6–4, 6–4 |
| 80 | 28-07-1965 | Baden Baden International | Baden-Baden | Clay | (Australia) Lesley Turner | 6–2, 6–1 |
| 81 | 02-08-1965 | German International Championships | Hamburg | Clay | (West Germany) Edda Buding | 6–2, 6–3 |
| 82 | 11-08-1965 | Moscow International Championships | Moscow | Hard (i) | (Soviet Union) Galina Baksheeva | 6–2, 6–4 |
| 83 | 23-08-1965 | Portschach International | Pörtschach | Clay | (Argentina) Norma Baylon | 6–1, 6–3 |
| 84 | 03-09-1965 | U.S. National Championships | Forest Hills | Grass | (United States) Billie-Jean Moffitt | 8–6, 7–5 |
| 85 | 09-10-1965 | Glen Iris Invitational | Glen Iris | Grass | (Australia) Maureen Pratt | 6–2, 6–0 |
| 86 | 02-11-1965 | Queensland Grass Court Championships | Brisbane | Grass | (Australia) Lesley Turner | 6–2, 6–3 |
| 87 | 13-11-1965 | New South Wales Championships | Sydney | Grass | (United States) Nancy Richey | 6–2, 6–2 |
| 88 | 26–11-1965 | Victorian Championships | Melbourne | Grass | (United States) Nancy Richey | 5–7, 6–3, 6–2 |
| 89 | 04-01-1966 | Western Australian Championships | Perth | Grass | (United States) Nancy Richey | 6–3, 6–1 |
| 90 | 21-01-1966 | Australian Championships | Sydney | Grass | (United States) Nancy Richey | walkover |
| 91 | 03-02-1966 | Auckland Wills International | Auckland | Grass | (Australia) Kerry Melville | 6–1, 6–1 |
| 92 | 04-07-1966 | Irish Championships | Dublin | Grass | (United States) Kathleen Harter | 6–2, 6–1 |
| 93 | 11-07-1966 | Hoylake and West Kirby Open | Hoylake | Grass | (South Africa) Annette Van Zyl | 3–6, 6–1, 6–4 |
| 94 | 01-08-1966 | German International Championships | Hamburg | Clay | (Brazil) Maria Bueno | 8–6, 6–3 |
| 95 | 01-03-1968 | City of Perth Championships | Perth | Grass | (Australia) Lesley Hunt | 8–6, 6–1 |
| 96 | 01-04-1968 | South African Open | Johannesburg | Hard | (United Kingdom) Virginia Wade | 6–4, 6–4 |
↓ Open era ↓
| 97 | 29-04-1968 | London Hard Court Championships | Hurlingham | Clay | (United Kingdom) Virginia Wade | 6–3, 6–2 |
| 98 | 03-06–1968 | Northern Championships | Manchester | Grass | (United Kingdom) Virginia Wade | 6–4, 4–6, 6–4 |
| 99 | 10-06–1968 | Kent Open | Beckham | Grass | (United Kingdom) Ann Haydon Jones | 11–9, 6–2 |
| 100 | 08-07-1968 | Irish Open Championships | Dublin | Grass | (United Kingdom) Ann Haydon-Jones | 6–3, 6–1 |
| 101 | 15-07-1968 | Liverpool Post North of England Championships | Hoylake | Grass | (United Kingdom) Virginia Wade | 6–2, 6–4 |
| 102 | 22-07-1968 | Dutch Open Championships | Hilversum | Clay | (Australia) Judy Tegart | 8–6, 6–0 |
| 103 | 18-08-1968 | U.S. Amateur Championships | Chestnut Hill | Grass | (Brazil) Maria Bueno | 6–2, 6–2 |
| 104 | 23-09-1968 | Pacific Coast Championships | Berkeley | Hard | (Brazil) Maria Bueno | 6–4, 7–5 |
| 105 | 14-10-1968 | Dewar Cup Stalybridge | Stalybridge | Hard (i) | (United Kingdom) Winnie Shaw | 7–5, 6–4 |
| 106 | 22-10-1968 | Dewar Cup Perth | Perth | Hard (i) | (United States) Mary-Ann Eisel | 6–2, 6–4 |
| 107 | 28-10-1968 | Dewar Cup Aberavon | Aberavon | Carpet (i) | (United Kingdom) Virginia Wade | 6–3, 4–6, 6–4 |
| 108 | 04-11-1968 | Dewar Cup Torquay | Torquay | Hard (i) | (United Kingdom) Virginia Wade | 12–10, 8–6 |
| 109 | 11-11-1968 | British Covered Court Championships | London | Hard (i) | (United Kingdom) Virginia Wade | 10–8, 6–1 |
| 110 | 01-01-1969 | Western Australian Open | Perth | Grass | (Australia) Lesley Hunt | 7–5, 6–1 |
| 111 | 06-01-1969 | Victorian Open | Melbourne | Grass | (Australia) Kerry Harris | 6–1, 6–4 |
| 112 | 13-01-1969 | AMPOL New South Wales Open | Sydney | Grass | (United States) Rosie Casals | 6–1, 6–2 |
| 113 | 20-01-1969 | Australian Open | Brisbane | Grass | (United States) Billie Jean King | 6–4, 6–1 |
| 114 | 03-03-1969 | Altamira International Open Invitation | Caracas | Hard | (Brazil) Maria Bueno | walkover |
| 115 | 31-03-1969 | Caribe Hilton International | San Juan | Hard | (United States) Julie Heldman | 6–4, 7–5 |
| 116 | 07-04-1969 | Carolinas International | Charlotte | Clay | (Australia) Judy Tegart | 6–1, 6–1 |
| 117 | 14-04-1969 | River Oaks Invitational | Houston | Clay | (Australia) Judy Tegart | 3–6, 7–5, 6–1 |
| 118 | 28-04-1969 | British Hard Court Open Championships | Bournemouth | Clay | (United Kingdom) Winnie Shaw | 5–7, 6–4, 6–4 |
| 119 | 12-05-1969 | London Hard Court Championships | Hurlingham | Clay | (United States) Mary-Ann Eisel | 7–5, 6–1 |
| 120 | 26-05-1969 | French Open | Paris | Clay | (United Kingdom) Ann Haydon Jones | 6–1, 4–6, 6–3 |
| 121 | 09-06–1969 | Wills West of England Open Championships | Bristol | Grass | (United States) Billie Jean King | 6–3, 6–3 |
| 122 | 07-07-1969 | Welsh Championships | Newport | Grass | (United Kingdom) Winnie Shaw | 6–4, 6–4 |
| 123 | 14-07-1969 | Essex Championships | Frinton-on-Sea | Grass | (South Africa) Pat Walkden | 6–2, 4–6, 6–4 |
| 124 | 04-08-1969 | Piping Rock Invitation | Locust Valley | Grass | (United States) Betty-Ann Grubb | 6–1, 6–3 |
| 125 | 11-08-1969 | 70th Pennsylvania Grass Court Championships | Haverford | Grass | (United Kingdom) Virginia Wade | 6–4, 6–4 |
| 126 | 16-08-1969 | US National Tennis Championships | Chestnut Hill | Grass | (United Kingdom) Virginia Wade | 4–6, 6–3, 6–0 |
| 127 | 28-08-1969 | US Open | Forest Hills | Grass | (United States) Nancy Richey | 6–2, 6–2 |
| 128 | 21-09-1969 | Pacific Coast International Open | Berkeley | Hard | (United Kingdom) Winnie Shaw | 6–4, 5–7, 6–0 |
| 129 | 30-12-1969 | Western Australian Championships | Perth | Grass | (Australia) Kerry Melville | 6–4, 6–4 |
| 130 | 05-01-1970 | Tasmanian Open Championships | Hobart | Grass | (Australia) Kerry Melville | 6–2, 6–2 |
| 131 | 10-01-1970 | Victorian Open Grass Court Championships | Melbourne | Grass | (Australia) Kerry Melville | 6–1, 6–1 |
| 132 | 19-01-1970 | Australian Open | Sydney | Grass | (Australia) Kerry Melville | 6–3, 6–1 |
| 133 | 02-02-1970 | ITPA Open Indoor | Philadelphia | Carpet (i) | (United States) Billie Jean King | 6–3, 7–612 |
| 134 | 09-02-1970 | Vanderbilt Indoor Open | New York City | Carpet (i) | (United Kingdom) Virginia Wade | 6–3, 6–3 |
| 135 | 13-02-1970 | Maureen Connolly Brinker Memorial | Dallas | Carpet (i) | (United States) Billie Jean King | 1–6, 6–3, 11–9 |
| 136 | 22-03-1970 | South African Breweries Open | Johannesburg | Hard | (United States) Billie Jean King | 6–4, 1–6, 6–3 |
| 137 | 20-04-1970 | Rothmans Sutton Hard Court Championships | Sutton | Clay | (United Kingdom) Ann Haydon Jones | 6–3, 6–3 |
| 138 | 27-04-1970 | Rothmans Open Hard Court Championships of Great Britain | Bournemouth | Clay | (United Kingdom) Virginia Wade | 6–2, 6–4 |
| 139 | 04-05-1970 | Rothmans Surrey Hard Court Championships | Guildford | Clay | (United States) Patti Hogan | 6–4, 6–2 |
| 140 | 26-05-1970 | French Open | Paris | Clay | (West Germany) Helga Masthoff | 6–2, 6–4 |
| 141 | 08-06–1970 | Wills West of England Open Championships | Bristol | Grass | (France) Françoise Dürr | 6–1, 6–1 |
| 142 | 15-06–1970 | Rothmans Open London Championships | London | Grass | (United Kingdom) Winnie Shaw | 2–6, 8–6, 6–2 |
| 143 | 22-06–1970 | Wimbledon Championships | Wimbledon | Grass | (United States) Billie Jean King | 14–12, 11–9 |
| 144 | 13-07-1970 | Essex Championships | Frinton-On-Sea | Grass | (United Kingdom) Ann Haydon Jones | 2–6, 7–5, 6–2 |
| 145 | 20-07-1970 | Budapest International Championships | Budapest | Clay | (Czechoslovakia) Vlasta Kodesova | 6–2, 6–3 |
| 146 | 27-07-1970 | Dutch Open Championships | Hilversum | Clay | (Australia) Kerry Melville | 6–1, 6–1 |
| 147 | 03-08-1970 | Pennsylvania Grass Court Championships | Haverford | Grass | (South Africa) Pat Walkden | 6–1, 6–0 |
| 148 | 10-08-1970 | Rothmans Canadian Open | Toronto | Clay | (United States) Rosie Casals | 6–8, 6–4, 6–4 |
| 149 | 02-09-1970 | US Open | Forest Hills | Grass | (United States) Rosie Casals | 6–2, 2–6, 6–1 |
| 150 | 30-12-1970 | Western Australian Open | Perth | Grass | (United Kingdom) Virginia Wade | 6–1, 6–2 |
| 151 | 11-01-1971 | New South Wales Open | Sydney | Grass | (Soviet Union) Olga Morozova | 6–2, 6–2 |
| 152 | 03-03-1971 | Benson and Hedges Centennial NZ Open | Auckland | Grass | (Australia) Evonne Goolagong | 3–6, 7–6, 6–2 |
| 153 | 07-03-1971 | Australian Open | Sydney | Grass | (Australia) Evonne Goolagong | 2–6, 7–6, 7–5 |
| 154 | 29-03-1971 | Natal Open Championships | Durban | Hard | (United States) Patti Hogan | 6–2, 6–1 |
| 155 | 05-04-1971 | South African Open | Johannesburg | Hard | (Australia) Evonne Goolagong | 6–3, 6–1 |
| 156 | 10-05-1971 | Bio-Strath London Hard Court Open Championships | Hurlingham | Clay | (Australia) Françoise Dürr | 6–0, 6–3 |
| 157 | 17-05-1971 | Rothmans British Hard Court Championships | Bournemouth | Clay | (Australia) Evonne Goolagong | 7–5, 6–1 |
| 158 | 14-06–1971 | Rothmans London Grass Court Championships | London | Grass | (United States) Billie Jean King | 6–3, 3–6, 6–3 |
| 159 | 05-07-1971 | Irish Open | Dublin | Grass | (Australia) Evonne Goolagong | 6–3, 2–6, 6–3 |
| 160 | 01-08-1972 | Western Championships | Cincinnati | Clay | (Australia) Evonne Goolagong | 3–6, 6–2, 7–5 |
| 161 | 22-08-1972 | Virginia Slims of Newport | Newport (RI) | Grass | (United States) Billie Jean King | 6–4, 6–1 |
| 162 | 18-09-1972 | Golden Gate Pacific Coast Classic | Albany | Hard | (United States) Billie Jean King | 6–4, 6–1 |
| 163 | 17-10-1972 | Dewar Cup Billingham | Billingham | Carpet (i) | (United States) Julie Heldman | 7–5, 6–0 |
| 164 | 24-10-1972 | Dewar Cup Edinburgh | Edinburgh | Carpet (i) | (United Kingdom) Virginia Wade | 6–3, 3–6, 7–5 |
| 165 | 31-10-1972 | Dewar Cup Aberavon | Aberavon | Carpet (i) | (United Kingdom) Virginia Wade | 6–3, 6–4 |
| 166 | 06–11-1972 | Dewar Cup Torquay | Torquay | Carpet (i) | (United Kingdom) Virginia Wade | 2–6, 6–3, 6–1 |
| 167 | 16–11-1972 | Dewar Cup Finals | London | Carpet (i) | (United Kingdom) Virginia Wade | 6–1, 6–1 |
| 168 | 04-12-1972 | Western Australian Championships | Perth | Grass | (Australia) Evonne Goolagong | 6–3, 6–2 |
| 169 | 26–12-1972 | Australian Open | Melbourne | Grass | (Australia) Evonne Goolagong | 6–4, 7–5 |
| 170 | 02-01-1973 | New South Wales Open | Sydney | Grass | (Australia) Evonne Goolagong | 4–6, 6–3, 10–8 |
| 171 | 16-01-1973 | British Motor Cars Invitational | Oakland | Carpet (i) | (Australia) Kerry Melville | 6–3, 6–3 |
| 172 | 23-01-1973 | British Motor Cars of Los Angeles | Inglewood | Carpet (i) | (United States) Nancy Richey Gunter | 7–5, 6–7, 7–5 |
| 173 | 29-01-1973 | Virginia Slims of Washington | Bethesda | Carpet (i) | (Australia) Kerry Melville | 6–1, 6–2 |
| 174 | 05-02-1973 | Barnett Bank Classic | Miami Beach | Clay | (Australia) Kerry Melville | 4–6, 6–1, 7–5 |
| 175 | 28-02-1973 | Virginia Slims of Detroit | Detroit | Carpet (i) | (Australia) Kerry Melville | 7–6, 6–3 |
| 176 | 05-03-1973 | Virginia Slims of Chicago | Chicago | Carpet (i) | (United States) Billie Jean King | 6–2, 4–6, 6–4 |
| 177 | 12-03-1973 | Virginia Slims of Richmond | Richmond | Clay | (United States) Janet Newberry | 6–2, 6–1 |
| 178 | 02-04-1973 | Max-Pax Coffee Classic | Philadelphia | Hard | (Australia) Kerry Harris | 6–1, 6–0 |
| 179 | 09-04-1973 | Virginia Slims Indoors | Boston | Hard | (United States) Billie Jean King | 6–2, 6–4 |
| 180 | 16-04-1973 | Virginia Slims of Jacksonville | Jacksonville | Clay | (United States) Rosie Casals | 5–7, 6–3, 6–1 |
| 181 | 21-05-1973 | French Open | Paris | Clay | (United States) Chris Evert | 6–7, 7–6, 6–4 |
| 182 | 09-07-1973 | Carroll's Irish Open | Dublin | Grass | (United Kingdom) Virginia Wade | 6–2, 6–4 |
| 183 | 06-08-1973 | Commerce Union Bank Classic | Nashville | Clay | (United States) Billie Jean King | 6–3, 4–6, 6–2 |
| 184 | 13-08-1973 | Jersey Shore Tennis Classic | Wall Township | Grass | (Australia) Lesley Hunt | 4–6, 6–2, 6–3 |
| 185 | 19-08-1973 | Virginia Slims Grass Court Championships | Newport (RI) | Grass | (United States) Julie Heldman | 6–3, 6–2 |
| 186 | 27-08-1973 | US Open | Forest Hills | Grass | (Australia) Evonne Goolagong | 7–6, 5–7, 6–2 |
| 187 | 09-09-1973 | World Invitational Tennis Classic | Hilton Head | Hard | (United States) Chris Evert | 6–4, 6–7, 6–2 |
| 188 | 09-12-1974 | Western Australian Open | Perth | Grass | (Soviet Union) Olga Morozova | 6–4, 7–5 |
| 189 | 10-02-1975 | Virginia Slims of Chicago | Chicago | Carpet (i) | (Czechoslovakia) Martina Navrátilová | 6–3, 3–6, 6–2 |
| 190 | 16-09-1975 | Toray Sillook Open | Tokyo | Carpet (i) | (Australia) Evonne Goolagong | 6–7, 6–1, 7–5 |
| 191 | 06–12-1976 | Toyota Women's Classic | Melbourne | Grass | (United Kingdom) Sue Barker | 6–2, 6–2 |

== Federation Cup ==
Court played in the then-named Federation Cup since its inception in 1963, and then played again in 1964 and 1965. She returned to the tournament after her temporary retirement, and played again with the Australian Fed Cup team in 1968, 1969 and finally in December 1970. Of the six years she played, the Australian team won in four: 1964, 1965, 1968 and December 1970. She accumulated a total of 35 wins over her career, which ties with Evonne Goolagong Cawley and Dianne Balestrat as the third-most ever from an Australian. She holds a perfect 20–0 singles record, a near-perfect 40–1 singles set record, tying with Kerry Reid as the best-ever from an Australian. Her doubles record of 15–5 is the fifth-highest of an Australian.

=== Wins (4) ===
| Edition | (Australia) Australian Team | Rounds/Opponents |
|---|---|---|
| 1964 | Margaret Smith; Lesley Turner; Robyn Ebbern | 2R: (Australia) 3–0 (Denmark); QF: (Australia) 3–0 (Canada); SF: (Australia) 3–0 (France); FN: (United States) 1–2 (Australia) |
| 1965 | Margaret Smith; Lesley Turner; Judy Tegart | QF: (Australia) 3–0 (New Zealand); SF: (Australia) 3–0 (France); FN: (Australia) 2–1 (United States) |
| 1968 | Margaret Court; Kerry Melville | 2R: (Australia) 3–0 (Brazil); QF: (Australia) 2–1 (South Africa); SF: (Australia) 3–0 (United Kingdom); FN: (Australia) 3–0 (Netherlands) |
| 1971 | Margaret Court; Evonne Goolagong; Lesley Hunt | QF: (Australia) w/o (Socialist Federal Republic of Yugoslavia); SF: (Australia) 3–0 (France); FN: (Australia) 3–0 (United Kingdom) |

=== Participations (40) ===
==== Singles (20) ====
| Edition | Round | Date | Venue | Against | Surface | Opponent | W/L | Result | Team Result |
|---|---|---|---|---|---|---|---|---|---|
| 1963 | 1R | 17 June 1963 | London | Belgium | Grass | (Belgium) Christiane Mercelis | Win | 6–3, 6–1 | Win (3–0) |
| 1963 | QF | 18 June 1963 | London | Hungary | Grass | (Hungary) Zsuzsa Körmöczy | Win | 6–0, 6–1 | Win (3–0) |
| 1963 | SF | 19 June 1963 | London | South Africa | Grass | (South Africa) Renee Schuurman | Win | 6–3, 6–2 | Win (3–0) |
| 1963 | F | 20 June 1963 | London | United States | Grass | (United States) Darlene Hard | Win | 6–3, 6–0 | Loss (1–2) |
| 1964 | 2R | 2 September 1964 | Philadelphia | Denmark | Grass | (Denmark) Pia Balling | Win | 6–2, 6–1 | Win (3–0) |
| 1964 | QF | 2 September 1964 | Philadelphia | Canada | Grass | (Canada) Benita Senn | Win | 6–1, 6–0 | Win (3–0) |
| 1964 | SF | 4 September 1964 | Philadelphia | France | Grass | (France) Françoise Dürr | Win | 6–4, 6–1 | Win (3–0) |
| 1964 | F | 5 September 1964 | Philadelphia | United States | Grass | (United States) Billie Jean Moffitt | Win | 6–2, 6–3 | Win (2–1) |
| 1965 | QF | 16 January 1965 | Melbourne | New Zealand | Grass | (New Zealand) Ruia Morrison-Davy | Win | 6–1, 6–4 | Win (3–0) |
| 1965 | SF | 17 January 1965 | Melbourne | France | Grass | (France) Françoise Dürr | Win | 6–2, 6–2 | Win (3–0) |
| 1965 | F | 18 January 1965 | Melbourne | United States | Grass | (United States) Billie Jean Moffitt | Win | 6–4, 8–6 | Win (2–1) |
| 1968 | 2R | 22 May 1968 | Paris | Brazil | Clay | (Brazil) Suzana Gesteira | Win | 6–0, 6–0 | Win (3–0) |
| 1968 | QF | 24 May 1968 | Paris | South Africa | Clay | (South Africa) Annette Du Plooy | Win | 6–1, 6–1 | Win (2–1) |
| 1968 | SF | 25 May 1968 | Paris | (United Kingdom) Great Britain | Clay | (United Kingdom) Christine Janes | Win | 7–5, 6–1 | Win (3–0) |
| 1968 | F | 26 May 1968 | Paris | Netherlands | Clay | (Netherlands) Astrid Suurbeck | Win | 6–1, 6–3 | Win (3–0) |
| 1969 | QF | 23 May 1969 | Athens | France | Clay | (France) Rosy Darmon | Win | 6–1, 6–1 | Win (3–0) |
| 1969 | SF | 24 May 1969 | Athens | (United Kingdom) Great Britain | Clay | (United Kingdom) Virginia Wade | Win | 6–3, 6–4 | Win (3–0) |
| 1969 | F | 25 May 1969 | Athens | United States | Clay | (United States) Julie Heldman | Win | 6–4, 8–6 | Loss (1–2) |
| 1971 | SF | 28 December 1970 | Perth | France | Grass | (France) Gail Benedetti | Win | 6–1, 6–1 | Win (3–0) |
| 1971 | F | 29 December 1970 | Perth | (United Kingdom) Great Britain | Grass | (United Kingdom) Ann Jones | Win | 6–8, 6–3, 6–3 | Win (3–0) |

==== Doubles (20) ====
| Edition | Round | Date | Venue | Partnering | Against | Surface | Opponents | W/L | Result | Team Result |
|---|---|---|---|---|---|---|---|---|---|---|
| 1963 | 1R | 17 June 1963 | London | (Australia) Lesley Turner | Belgium | Grass | (Belgium) Mary Marechal (Belgium) Christiane Mercelis | Win | 6–1, 6–0 | Win (3–0) |
| 1963 | QF | 18 June 1963 | London | (Australia) Lesley Turner | Hungary | Grass | (Hungary) Klára Bardóczy (Hungary) Zsófia Broszmann | Win | 6–1, 6–1 | Win (3–0) |
| 1963 | SF | 19 June 1963 | London | (Australia) Lesley Turner | South Africa | Grass | (South Africa) Margaret Hunt (South Africa) Renee Schuurman | Win | 5–7, 6–3, 6–3 | Win (3–0) |
| 1963 | F | 20 June 1963 | London | (Australia) Lesley Turner | United States | Grass | (United States) Darlene Hard (United States) Billie Jean Moffitt | Loss | 3–6, 13–11, 3–6 | Loss (1–2) |
| 1964 | 2R | 2 September 1964 | Philadelphia | (Australia) Robyn Ebbern | Denmark | Grass | (Denmark) Pia Balling (Denmark) Ulla Pontoppidan | Win | 6–0, 6–1 | Win (3–0) |
| 1964 | QF | 3 September 1964 | Philadelphia | (Australia) Lesley Turner | Canada | Grass | (Canada) Vicki Berner (Canada) Louise Brown | Win | 6–1, 6–2 | Win (3–0) |
| 1964 | SF | 4 September 1964 | Philadelphia | (Australia) Lesley Turner | France | Grass | (France) Françoise Dürr (France) Janine Lieffrig | Win | 6–3, 9–7 | Win (3–0) |
| 1964 | F | 5 September 1964 | Philadelphia | (Australia) Lesley Turner | United States | Grass | (United States) Billie Jean Moffitt (United States) Karen Hantze Susman | Loss | 6–4, 5–7, 1–6 | Win (2–1) |
| 1965 | QF | 16 January 1965 | Melbourne | (Australia) Judy Tegart | New Zealand | Grass | (New Zealand) Ruia Morrison-Davy (New Zealand) Elizabeth Terry | Win | 6–2, 6–1 | Win (3–0) |
| 1965 | SF | 17 January 1965 | Melbourne | (Australia) Judy Tegart | France | Grass | (France) Françoise Dürr (France) Janine Lieffrig | Win | 6–1, 6–4 | Win (3–0) |
| 1965 | F | 18 January 1965 | Melbourne | (Australia) Judy Tegart | United States | Grass | (United States) Carole Caldwell Graebner (United States) Billie Jean Moffitt | Loss | 5–7, 6–4, 4–6 | Win (2–1) |
| 1968 | 2R | 22 May 1968 | Paris | (Australia) Kerry Melville | Brazil | Clay | (Brazil) Maria-Cristina Borba-Dias (Brazil) Suzana Gesteira | Win | 6–0, 6–2 | Win (3–0) |
| 1968 | QF | 24 May 1968 | Paris | (Australia) Kerry Melville | South Africa | Clay | (South Africa) Annette Du Plooy (South Africa) Maryna Proctor | Loss | 4–6, 6–2, 2–6 | Win (2–1) |
| 1968 | SF | 25 May 1968 | Paris | (Australia) Kerry Melville | (United Kingdom) Great Britain | Clay | (United Kingdom) Winnie Shaw (United Kingdom) Virginia Wade | Win | 9–7, 3–6, 14–12 | Win (3–0) |
| 1968 | F | 26 May 1968 | Paris | (Australia) Kerry Melville | Netherlands | Clay | (Netherlands) Astrid Suurbeek (Netherlands) Lidy Venneboer | Win | 6–3, 6–8, 7–5 | Win (3–0) |
| 1969 | QF | 23 May 1969 | Athens | (Australia) Judy Tegart | France | Clay | (France) Gail Benedetti (France) Rosy Darmon | Win | 6–1, 6–2 | Win (3–0) |
| 1969 | SF | 24 May 1969 | Athens | (Australia) Judy Tegart | (United Kingdom) Great Britain | Clay | (United Kingdom) Virginia Wade (United Kingdom) Joyce Williams | Win | 4–6, 6–2, 6–3 | Win (3–0) |
| 1969 | F | 25 May 1969 | Athens | (Australia) Judy Tegart | United States | Clay | (United States) Peaches Bartkowicz (United States) Nancy Richey | Loss | 4–6, 4–6 | Loss (1–2) |
| 1971 | SF | 28 December 1970 | Perth | (Australia) Evonne Goolagong | France | Grass | (France) Gail Benedetti (France) Françoise Dürr | Win | 6–2, 6–3 | Win (3–0) |
| 1971 | F | 29 December 1970 | Perth | (Australia) Lesley Hunt | (United Kingdom) Great Britain | Grass | (United Kingdom) Winnie Shaw (United Kingdom) Virginia Wade | Win | 6–4, 6–4 | Win (3–0) |
