= 1963 Wimbledon Championships – Women's doubles =

Women's doubles
- 1963 Wimbledon Championships

Final
- Champions: (Brazil) Maria Bueno (United States) Darlene Hard
- Runners-up: (Australia) Robyn Ebbern (Australia) Margaret Smith
- Score: 8–6, 9–7

Details
- Draw: 48 (5 Q )
- Seeds: 4

Events
Singles	men	women		boys	girls
Doubles	men	women	mixed	boys	girls
← 1962 ·	Wimbledon Championships	· 1964 →

Billie Jean Moffitt and Karen Susman were the defending champions, but Susman did not compete as she was expecting her first child. Moffitt partnered with Carole Caldwell but lost in the second round to Deidre Catt and Liz Starkie.

Maria Bueno and Darlene Hard defeated Robyn Ebbern and Margaret Smith in the final, 8–6, 9–7 to win the ladies' doubles tennis title at the 1963 Wimbledon Championships.

== Seeds ==
1. (Australia) Robyn Ebbern / (Australia) Margaret Smith (final)
2. (Brazil) Maria Bueno / (United States) Darlene Hard (champions)
3. (Australia) Jan Lehane / (Australia) Lesley Turner (second round)
4. (United Kingdom) Ann Jones / (South Africa) Renée Schuurman (semifinals)

Click on the seed number of a player to go to their draw section.

== Draw ==
=== Key ===
- Q = Qualifier
- WC = Wild card
- LL = Lucky loser
- Alt = Alternate
- SE = Special exempt
- PR = Protected ranking
- ITF = ITF entry
- JE = Junior exempt
- w/o = Walkover
- r = Retired
- d = Defaulted
- SR = Special ranking

=== Finals ===
Quarterfinals
1	(Australia) Robyn Ebbern (Australia) Margaret Smith	6	6
(United Kingdom) Angela Mortimer (Mexico) Yola Ochoa	1	0
4	(United Kingdom) Ann Jones (South Africa) Renée Schuurman	6	6
(South Africa) Margaret Hunt (South Africa) Annette Van Zyl	3	2
(United States) Constance Jaster (Australia) Noelene Turner	1	3
(Soviet Union) Anna Dmitrieva (Australia) Judy Tegart	6	6
(Australia) Robin Lesh (United Kingdom) Jenny Trewby	2	1
2	(Brazil) Maria Bueno (United States) Darlene Hard	6	6

Semifinals
1	(Australia) Robyn Ebbern (Australia) Margaret Smith	7	3	6
4	(United Kingdom) Ann Jones (South Africa) Renée Schuurman	5	6	3
(Soviet Union) Anna Dmitrieva (Australia) Judy Tegart	4	7
2	(Brazil) Maria Bueno (United States) Darlene Hard	6	9

Final
1	(Australia) Robyn Ebbern (Australia) Margaret Smith	6	7
2	(Brazil) Maria Bueno (United States) Darlene Hard	8	9

=== Top half ===
==== Section 1 ====
First round

Second round
1	(Australia) Robyn Ebbern (Australia) Margaret Smith	6	6
(France) Isabelle de Lansalut (United States) Carol-Ann Prosen	1	2
(United Kingdom) Lorna Cawthorn (United Kingdom) Robin Lloyd	2	3
(Italy) Silvana Lazzarino (Italy) Lea Pericoli	6	6
(Spain) Marta Pombo (Spain) Mercedes Solsona	7	5
(Hungary) Klára Bardóczy (Hungary) Zsófia Broszmann	9	7
(United Kingdom) Angela Mortimer (Mexico) Yola Ochoa	6	6
Q	(United Kingdom) Heather Allen (United Kingdom) Mary McAnally	0	0

Third round
1	(Australia) R Ebbern (Australia) M Smith	6	6
(Italy) S Lazzarino (Italy) L Pericoli	1	2
(Hungary) K Bardóczy (Hungary) Z Broszmann	4	0
(United Kingdom) A Mortimer (Mexico) Y Ochoa	6	6

Fourth round
1	(Australia) R Ebbern (Australia) M Smith	6	6
(United Kingdom) A Mortimer (Mexico) Y Ochoa	1	0

==== Section 2 ====
First round
4	(United Kingdom) Ann Jones (South Africa) Renée Schuurman	6	6
(Norway) Liv Paldan (Norway) Tone Schirmer	3	1
(United Kingdom) Christine Truman (United Kingdom) Nell Truman	4	6	4
(United States) Tory Fretz (United States) Mary Habicht	6	3	6
(Sweden) Gudrun Rosin (Sweden) Ulla Sandulf	w/o
(United States) Carole Caldwell (United States) Billie Jean Moffitt
(West Germany) Margot Dohrer (West Germany) Renate Ostermann	1	1
(United Kingdom) Deidre Catt (United Kingdom) Liz Starkie	6	6
(South Africa) Margaret Hunt (South Africa) Annette Van Zyl	6	3	6
(United Kingdom) Joyce Barclay (United Kingdom) Carole Rosser	1	6	2
(Hungary) Zsuzsa Körmöczy (Belgium) Christiane Mercelis	w/o
(United Kingdom) Shirley Brasher (United Kingdom) Rosemary Deloford
(Netherlands) Eva de Jong (Netherlands) Jenny Ridderhof-Seven	6	6
(Canada) Hanna Sladek (United Kingdom) Jenny Wagstaff	2	3
(United States) Judy Alvarez (Australia) Carole Newman	6	6
(United Kingdom) Pauline Roberts (United Kingdom) Virginia Wade	4	3

Second round
4	(United Kingdom) A Jones (South Africa) R Schuurman	9	6
(United States) T Fretz (United States) M Habicht	7	2
(United States) C Caldwell (United States) BJ Moffitt	4	7	3
(United Kingdom) D Catt (United Kingdom) E Starkie	6	5	6
(South Africa) M Hunt (South Africa) A Van Zyl	6	7
(United Kingdom) S Brasher (United Kingdom) R Deloford	0	5
(Netherlands) E de Jong (Netherlands) J Ridderhof-Seven	5	6	6
(United States) J Alvarez (Australia) C Newman	7	2	4

Third round
4	(United Kingdom) A Jones (South Africa) R Schuurman	6	6
(United Kingdom) D Catt (United Kingdom) E Starkie	3	1
(South Africa) M Hunt (South Africa) A Van Zyl	6	7
(Netherlands) E de Jong (Netherlands) J Ridderhof-Seven	1	5

Fourth round
4	(United Kingdom) A Jones (South Africa) R Schuurman	6	6
(South Africa) M Hunt (South Africa) A Van Zyl	3	2

=== Bottom half ===
==== Section 3 ====
First round
(Argentina) Norma Baylon (Czechoslovakia) Věra Suková	6	6
Q	(United Kingdom) JA Haskew (United Kingdom) Jane Poynder	2	1
(Italy) Lucia Bassi (Italy) Francesca Gordigiani	6	2	3
(United States) Constance Jaster (Australia) Noelene Turner	0	6	6
(West Germany) Helga Niessen (West Germany) Heide Schildknecht	6	6
(France) Márta Peterdy-Wolf (West Germany) Almut Sturm	3	3
(Denmark) Pia Balling (Denmark) Ulla Rise	3	2
(Canada) Ann Barclay (Canada) Louise Brown	6	6
(West Germany) Edda Buding (West Germany) Helga Schultze	1	4
(Soviet Union) Anna Dmitrieva (Australia) Judy Tegart	6	6
(United Kingdom) Janet Kemp (United Kingdom) Jill Mills	1	3
Q	(United States) Jane Albert (United States) Susan Behlmar	6	6
(France) Françoise Dürr (France) Janine Lieffrig	6	6	4
(United Kingdom) Rita Bentley (Australia) Jill Blackman	4	8	6
(United Kingdom) Pat Hird (United Kingdom) Caroline Yates-Bell	4	3
3	(Australia) Jan Lehane (Australia) Lesley Turner	6	6

Second round
(Argentina) N Baylon (Czechoslovakia) V Suková	w/o
(United States) C Jaster (Australia) N Turner
(West Germany) H Niessen (West Germany) H Schildknecht	6	8
(Canada) A Barclay (Canada) L Brown	3	6
(Soviet Union) A Dmitrieva (Australia) J Tegart	6	6
Q	(United States) J Albert (United States) S Behlmar	2	4
(United Kingdom) R Bentley (Australia) J Blackman	7	6
3	(Australia) J Lehane (Australia) L Turner	5	1

Third round
(United States) C Jaster (Australia) N Turner	1	6	6
(West Germany) H Niessen (West Germany) H Schildknecht	6	3	4
(Soviet Union) A Dmitrieva (Australia) J Tegart	2	7	6
(United Kingdom) R Bentley (Australia) J Blackman	6	5	2

Fourth round
(United States) C Jaster (Australia) N Turner	1	3
(Soviet Union) A Dmitrieva (Australia) J Tegart	6	6

==== Section 4 ====
First round

Second round
Q	(Australia) Jean Barnes (United Kingdom) Alison Stroud	3	6
(Australia) Robin Lesh (United Kingdom) Jenny Trewby	6	8
(South Africa) Heather Segal (South Africa) Pam Watermeyer	6	6
Q	(United Kingdom) Sue Porter (United Kingdom) Sue Worsfield	3	4
(United States) Donna Fales (United States) Carol Hanks	6	6
(Austria) Sonja Pachta (Austria) Andrea Winkler	1	4
(Spain) Carmen Coronado (Spain) Ana María Estalella	0	1
2	(Brazil) Maria Bueno (United States) Darlene Hard	6	6

Third round
(Australia) R Lesh (United Kingdom) J Trewby	9	5	6
(South Africa) H Segal (South Africa) P Watermeyer	7	7	4
(United States) D Fales (United States) C Hanks	1	3
2	(Brazil) M Bueno (United States) D Hard	6	6

Fourth round
(Australia) R Lesh (United Kingdom) J Trewby	2	1
2	(Brazil) M Bueno (United States) D Hard	6	6
