= 1963 Wimbledon Championships – Mixed doubles =

Mixed doubles
- 1963 Wimbledon Championships

Final
- Champions: (Australia) Ken Fletcher (Australia) Margaret Smith
- Runners-up: (Australia) Bob Hewitt (United States) Darlene Hard
- Score: 11–9, 6–4

Details
- Draw: 80 (5Q)
- Seeds: 4

Events
Singles	men	women		boys	girls
Doubles	men	women	mixed	boys	girls
- Wimbledon Championships

Neale Fraser and Margaret duPont were the defending champions, but did not compete.

Ken Fletcher and Margaret Smith defeated Bob Hewitt and Darlene Hard in the final, 11–9, 6–4 to win the mixed doubles tennis title at the 1963 Wimbledon Championships.

== Seeds ==
1. (Australia) Fred Stolle / (Australia) Lesley Turner (semifinals)
2. (Australia) Ken Fletcher / (Australia) Margaret Smith (champions)
3. (United States) Dennis Ralston / (United Kingdom) Ann Jones (semifinals)
4. (Australia) Bob Howe / (Brazil) Maria Bueno (fourth round)

Click on the seed number of a player to go to their draw section.

== Draw ==
Key

- Q = Qualifier
- WC = Wild card
- LL = Lucky loser
- Alt = Alternate
- ITF = ITF entry
- PR = Protected ranking
- SR = Special ranking
- SE = Special exempt
- JE = Junior exempt
- JR = Junior Accelerator Programme entrant
- CO = College Accelerator Programme entrant
- NG = Next Gen Accelerator Program entrant
- w/o = Walkover
- r = Retired
- d = Defaulted

=== Finals ===
Quarterfinals
1	(Australia) Fred Stolle (Australia) Lesley Turner
(Socialist Federal Republic of Yugoslavia) Boro Jovanović (France) Janine Lieffrig	w/o
(United States) Arthur Ashe (United States) Carol Hanks	5	1
(Australia) Bob Hewitt (United States) Darlene Hard	7	6
(South Africa) Cliff Drysdale (South Africa) Margaret Hunt	2	4
3	(United States) Dennis Ralston (United Kingdom) Ann Jones	6	6
(West Germany) Wilhelm Bungert (South Africa) Renée Schuurman	2	1
2	(Australia) Ken Fletcher (Australia) Margaret Smith	6	6

Semifinals
1	(Australia) Fred Stolle (Australia) Lesley Turner	7	2	2
(Australia) Bob Hewitt (United States) Darlene Hard	5	6	6
3	(United States) Dennis Ralston (United Kingdom) Ann Jones	1	5
2	(Australia) Ken Fletcher (Australia) Margaret Smith	6	7

Final
(Australia) Bob Hewitt (United States) Darlene Hard	9	4
2	(Australia) Ken Fletcher (Australia) Margaret Smith	11	6

=== Top half ===
==== Section 1 ====
First round

Second round
1	(Australia) Fred Stolle (Australia) Lesley Turner	6	6
(United Kingdom) Stanley Matthews (United Kingdom) Virginia Wade	4	2
(Australia) John Newcombe (Australia) Jan Lehane	6	6
(Netherlands) Pieter van Eijsden (Netherlands) Jenny Ridderhof-Seven	4	2
(Austria) Franz Hainka (Austria) Edda Herdy	5	6
(South Africa) Keith Diepraam (South Africa) Pam Watermeyer	7	8
(France) Pierre Darmon (France) Rosie Darmon	6	6
(Italy) Alberto Lazzarino (Italy) Silvana Lazzarino	1	4

Third round
1	(Australia) F Stolle (Australia) L Turner
(Australia) J Newcombe (Australia) J Lehane	w/o
(South Africa) K Diepraam (South Africa) P Watermeyer	1	4
(France) P Darmon (France) R Darmon	6	6

Fourth round
1	(Australia) F Stolle (Australia) L Turner	6	6
(France) P Darmon (France) R Darmon	3	3

==== Section 2 ====
First round

Second round
(United States) Gardnar Mulloy (United States) Dorothy Knode	3	0
(United States) Donald Dell (South Africa) Heather Segal	6	6
(Australia) Alan Lane (United States) Mary Habicht	3	3
(United Kingdom) Mike Sangster (United Kingdom) Deidre Catt	6	6
(United Kingdom) Howard Walton (United Kingdom) Joyce Barclay	3	2
(Socialist Federal Republic of Yugoslavia) Boro Jovanović (France) Janine Lieffrig	6	6
(Norway) Gunnar Sjøwall (Norway) Tone Schirmer	2	4
(South Africa) David Phillips (South Africa) Charlene Rigby	6	6

Third round
(United States) D Dell (South Africa) H Segal	3	6	6
(United Kingdom) M Sangster (United Kingdom) D Catt	6	2	4
(Socialist Federal Republic of Yugoslavia) B Jovanović (France) J Lieffrig	6	6
(South Africa) D Phillips (South Africa) C Rigby	2	2

Fourth round
(United States) D Dell (South Africa) H Segal	1	9	4
(Socialist Federal Republic of Yugoslavia) B Jovanović (France) J Lieffrig	6	7	6

==== Section 3 ====
First round

Second round
4	(Australia) Bob Howe (Brazil) Maria Bueno	6	6
(Spain) Jaime Bartrolí (Spain) Marta Pombo	2	3
(Belgium) Eric Drossart (Belgium) Christiane Mercelis	11	14
(Australia) Ronald McKenzie (Italy) Roberta Beltrame	9	12
(Federation of Rhodesia and Nyasaland) Roy Stilwell (United Kingdom) Robin Lloyd	5	1
(United States) Arthur Ashe (United States) Carol Hanks	7	6
(Australia) Bob Carmichael (Australia) Jean Barnes	2	3
(Australia) Tony Roche (Australia) Noelene Turner	6	6

Third round
4	(Australia) R Howe (Brazil) M Bueno	6	6
(Belgium) E Drossart (Belgium) C Mercelis	4	4
(United States) A Ashe (United States) C Hanks	3	15	6
(Australia) A Roche (Australia) N Turner	6	13	2

Fourth round
4	(Australia) R Howe (Brazil) M Bueno	2	7	3
(United States) A Ashe (United States) C Hanks	6	5	6

==== Section 4 ====
First round
(United States) Gene Scott (United Kingdom) Angela Mortimer	6	4	4
(Australia) Neville Holland (Australia) Carole Newman	2	6	6
(Socialist Federal Republic of Yugoslavia) Nikola Pilić (West Germany) Edda Buding	6	7
(United Kingdom) Michael Hann (United Kingdom) Caroline Yates-Bell	3	5
(Sweden) Thomas Hallberg (Sweden) Gudrun Rosin	4	6	6
(India) Narenda Nath (United Kingdom) Hazel Cheadle	6	2	4
(France) Jacques Renavand (France) Françoise Dürr	7	4
(Australia) John Hillebrand (Australia) Jill Blackman	9	6
(Soviet Union) Toomas Leius (Italy) Francesca Gordigiani	3	4
(South Africa) Gordon Forbes (South Africa) Annette Van Zyl	6	6
(Australia) Owen Davidson (Australia) Robyn Ebbern	6	6
(India) Jaidip Mukerjea (Italy) Lucia Bassi	0	1
(Denmark) Jørgen Ulrich (Denmark) Ulla Rise	4	4
(Soviet Union) Sergei Likhachev (Soviet Union) Anna Dmitrieva	6	6
(Spain) José Luis Arilla (Spain) Peggy Templer	3	1
(Australia) Bob Hewitt (United States) Darlene Hard	6	6

Second round
(Australia) N Holland (Australia) C Newman	w/o
(Socialist Federal Republic of Yugoslavia) N Pilić (West Germany) E Buding
(Sweden) T Hallberg (Sweden) G Rosin	1	1
(Australia) J Hillebrand (Australia) J Blackman	6	6
(South Africa) G Forbes (South Africa) A Van Zyl	6	1	6
(Australia) O Davidson (Australia) R Ebbern	2	6	2
(Soviet Union) S Likhachev (Soviet Union) A Dmitrieva	4	2
(Australia) R Hewitt (United States) D Hard	6	6

Third round
(Socialist Federal Republic of Yugoslavia) N Pilić (West Germany) E Buding	6	6
(Australia) J Hillebrand (Australia) J Blackman	1	4
(South Africa) G Forbes (South Africa) A Van Zyl	2	4
(Australia) R Hewitt (United States) D Hard	6	6

Fourth round
(Socialist Federal Republic of Yugoslavia) N Pilić (West Germany) E Buding	5	4
(Australia) R Hewitt (United States) D Hard	7	6

=== Bottom half ===
==== Section 5 ====
First round
(United Kingdom) Mark Cox (United Kingdom) Liz Starkie	6	6
Q	(Australia) John Keller (Australia) Diane Howe	1	1
(Japan) Osamu Ishiguro (West Germany) Almut Sturm	w/o
(United Kingdom) Alan Mills (United Kingdom) Jill Mills
(Brazil) José Edison Mandarino (Spain) Carmen Coronado	6	6
(Norway) Thorvald Moe (Norway) Liv Paldan	3	4
(United Kingdom) John Crump (United Kingdom) Ann Anderson	2	1
(United Kingdom) Geoffrey Paish (United Kingdom) Pat Hird	6	6
(South Africa) Cliff Drysdale (South Africa) Margaret Hunt	6	6
(New Zealand) Ian Crookenden (United States) Carole Caldwell	4	2
(United Kingdom) Billy Knight (United Kingdom) Jean Knight	7	6
(Australia) Allan Kendall (Canada) Vicki Berner	5	1
(Chile) Patricio Rodríguez (United States) Carol-Ann Prosen	6	6
(France) Jean Borotra (France) Isabelle de Lansalut	0	4
Q	(Canada) Keith Carpenter (United Kingdom) Mary McAnally	3	6	4
(United Kingdom) Harry Matheson (United Kingdom) Carole Rosser	6	1	6

Second round
(United Kingdom) M Cox (United Kingdom) E Starkie	3	6	6
(United Kingdom) A Mills (United Kingdom) J Mills	6	2	4
(Brazil) JE Mandarino (Spain) C Coronado	9	6
(United Kingdom) G Paish (United Kingdom) P Hird	7	1
(South Africa) C Drysdale (South Africa) M Hunt	6	6
(United Kingdom) W Knight (United Kingdom) J Knight	1	2
(Chile) P Rodríguez (United States) C-A Prosen	0	6	9
(United Kingdom) H Matheson (United Kingdom) C Rosser	6	1	7

Third round
(United Kingdom) M Cox (United Kingdom) E Starkie	6	4	5
(Brazil) JE Mandarino (Spain) C Coronado	2	6	7
(South Africa) C Drysdale (South Africa) M Hunt	6	6
(Chile) P Rodríguez (United States) C-A Prosen	2	4

Fourth round
(Brazil) JE Mandarino (Spain) C Coronado	2	4
(South Africa) C Drysdale (South Africa) M Hunt	6	6

==== Section 6 ====
First round

Second round
(United Kingdom) Humphrey Truman (United Kingdom) Christine Truman	6	6
(Colombia) William Álvarez (United States) Pat Edrich	3	2
(United Kingdom) Roger Taylor (Czechoslovakia) Věra Suková	w/o
(Denmark) Carl-Edvard Hedelund (Denmark) Pia Balling
Q	(New Zealand) Mark Otway (United Kingdom) Jenny Trewby	w/o
(Southern Rhodesia) Don Black (Australia) Robin Lesh
(Spain) Emilio Martínez (Spain) Mercedes Solsona	0	1
3	(United States) Dennis Ralston (United Kingdom) Ann Jones	6	6

Third round
(United Kingdom) H Truman (United Kingdom) C Truman	6	6
(Denmark) C Hedelund (Denmark) P Balling	3	1
(Southern Rhodesia) D Black (Australia) R Lesh	1	2
3	(United States) D Ralston (United Kingdom) A Jones	6	6

Fourth round
(United Kingdom) H Truman (United Kingdom) C Truman	3	7	5
3	(United States) D Ralston (United Kingdom) A Jones	6	5	7

==== Section 7 ====
First round

Second round
(Australia) Warren Jacques (United Kingdom) Rita Bentley	6	4	4
(Argentina) Eduardo Soriano (Argentina) Norma Baylon	2	6	6
(Sweden) Jan-Erik Lundqvist (Sweden) Eva Lundqvist	5	1
(United Kingdom) Gerry Oakley (United Kingdom) Billie Woodgate	7	6
Q	(South Africa) Tony Hagan (South Africa) CM Callanan	2	3
(Netherlands) Willem Maris (Netherlands) Eva de Jong	6	6
(West Germany) Wilhelm Bungert (South Africa) Renée Schuurman	6	4	6
(Switzerland) Dimitri Sturdza (West Germany) Helga Schultze	4	6	1

Third round
(Argentina) E Soriano (Argentina) N Baylon	w/o
(United Kingdom) G Oakley (United Kingdom) R Woodgate
(Netherlands) W Maris (Netherlands) E de Jong	3	1
(West Germany) W Bungert (South Africa) R Schuurman	6	6

Fourth round
(United Kingdom) G Oakley (United Kingdom) R Woodgate	2	3
(West Germany) W Bungert (South Africa) R Schuurman	6	6

==== Section 8 ====
First round

Second round
(Australia) Owen French (Canada) Ann Barclay	6	7	13
Q	(United Kingdom) Roy Dixon (United Kingdom) Cathy Lyon	2	9	15
(Mexico) Alfonso Ochoa (Mexico) Yola Ochoa	6	7
(United States) Jack Frost (United States) Jane Albert	4	5
(India) Naresh Kumar (United Kingdom) Pauline Roberts	6	5	4
(Australia) John Fraser (United States) Judy Alvarez	3	7	6
(United States) Ed Rubinoff (Australia) Judy Tegart	2	2
2	(Australia) Ken Fletcher (Australia) Margaret Smith	6	6

Third round
(United Kingdom) R Dixon (United Kingdom) C Lyon	1	4
(Mexico) A Ochoa (Mexico) Y Ochoa	6	6
(Australia) J Fraser (United States) J Alvarez	2	7
2	(Australia) K Fletcher (Australia) M Smith	6	9

Fourth round
(Mexico) A Ochoa (Mexico) Y Ochoa	4	4
2	(Australia) K Fletcher (Australia) M Smith	6	6
