= 1992 Wimbledon Championships – Ladies' invitation doubles =

Ladies' invitation doubles
- 1992 Wimbledon Championships

Final
- Champions: (Australia) Wendy Turnbull (United Kingdom) Virginia Wade
- Runners-up: (United States) Rosie Casals (United States) Sharon Walsh-Pete
- Score: 3–6, 6–3, 7–5

Events
Singles	men	women		boys	girls
Doubles	men	women	mixed	boys	girls
WC Singles	men	women	quad
WC Doubles	men	women	quad
Legends	men	women	seniors
← 1991 ·	Wimbledon Championships	· 1993 →

Wendy Turnbull and Virginia Wade defeated Rosie Casals and Sharon Walsh-Pete in the final, 3–6, 6–3, 7–5.

== Seeds ==
1. (Australia) Wendy Turnbull / (United Kingdom) Virginia Wade (champions)
2. (United States) Rosie Casals / (United States) Sharon Walsh-Pete (final)
3. (Australia) Lesley Bowrey / (Australia) Judy Dalton (first round)
4. (France) Françoise Dürr / (Netherlands) Betty Stöve (semifinals)

== Draw ==
=== Key ===
- Q = Qualifier
- WC = Wild card
- LL = Lucky loser
- Alt = Alternate
- ITF = ITF entry
- PR = Protected ranking
- SR = Special ranking
- SE = Special exempt
- JE = Junior exempt
- JR = Junior Accelerator Programme entrant
- CO = College Accelerator Programme entrant
- NG = Next Gen Accelerator Program entrant
- w/o = Walkover
- r = Retired
- d = Defaulted

=== Draw ===
First round
1	(Australia) Wendy Turnbull (United Kingdom) Virginia Wade	6	6
(United States) Peggy Michel (United States) Yvonne Vermaak	2	1
3	(Australia) Lesley Bowrey (Australia) Judy Dalton	3	3
(Slovenia) Mima Jaušovec (Commonwealth of Independent States) Olga Morozova	6	6
(Australia) Helen Gourlay (United States) JoAnne Russell	6	6^{4}	5
4	(France) Françoise Dürr (Netherlands) Betty Stöve	2	7^{7}	7
(United Kingdom) Lesley Charles (Australia) Kerry Reid	3	3
2	(United States) Rosie Casals (United States) Sharon Walsh-Pete	6	6

Semifinals
1	(Australia) Wendy Turnbull (United Kingdom) Virginia Wade	6	6
(Slovenia) Mima Jaušovec (Commonwealth of Independent States) Olga Morozova	3	2
4	(France) Françoise Dürr (Netherlands) Betty Stöve	6	2	1
2	(United States) Rosie Casals (United States) Sharon Walsh-Pete	3	6	6

Final
1	(Australia) Wendy Turnbull (United Kingdom) Virginia Wade	3	6	7
2	(United States) Rosie Casals (United States) Sharon Walsh-Pete	6	3	5
