= 1963 Wimbledon Championships – Women's singles =

Women's singles
- 1963 Wimbledon Championships

Final
- Champion: (Australia) Margaret Smith
- Runner-up: (United States) Billie Jean Moffitt
- Score: 6–3, 6–4

Details
- Draw: 96 (10 Q )
- Seeds: 8

Events
Singles	men	women		boys	girls
Doubles	men	women	mixed	boys	girls
← 1962 ·	Wimbledon Championships	· 1964 →

First-seeded Margaret Smith defeated unseeded Billie Jean Moffitt in the final, 6–3, 6–4 to win the ladies' singles tennis title at the 1963 Wimbledon Championships. With the win, she completed the career Grand Slam in singles. The final was a rematch of the pair's second-round meeting the previous year.

Karen Susman was the reigning champion, but did not defend her title as she was expecting her first child.

== Seeds ==
1. (Australia) Margaret Smith (champion)
2. (Australia) Lesley Turner (fourth round)
3. (United Kingdom) Ann Jones (semifinals)
4. (United States) Darlene Hard (semifinals)
5. (Australia) Jan Lehane (quarterfinals)
6. (Czechoslovakia) Věra Suková (third round)
7. (Brazil) Maria Bueno (quarterfinals)
8. (South Africa) Renée Schuurman (quarterfinals)

Click on the seed number of a player to go to their draw section.

== Draw ==
=== Key ===
- Q = Qualifier
- WC = Wild card
- LL = Lucky loser
- Alt = Alternate
- SE = Special exempt
- PR = Protected ranking
- ITF = ITF entry
- JE = Junior exempt
- w/o = Walkover
- r = Retired
- d = Defaulted
- SR = Special ranking

=== Finals ===
Quarterfinals
1	(Australia) Margaret Smith	3	6	6
8	(South Africa) Renée Schuurman	6	0	1
4	(United States) Darlene Hard	6	1
5	(Australia) Jan Lehane	1	2^{r}
(United States) Donna Fales	4	1
3	(United Kingdom) Ann Jones	6	6
7	(Brazil) Maria Bueno	2	5
(United States) Billie Jean Moffitt	6	7

Semifinals
1	(Australia) Margaret Smith	6	6
4	(United States) Darlene Hard	3	3
3	(United Kingdom) Ann Jones	4	4
(United States) Billie Jean Moffitt	6	6

Final
1	(Australia) Margaret Smith	6	6
(United States) Billie Jean Moffitt	3	4

=== Top half ===
==== Section 1 ====
First round

Second round
1	(Australia) Margaret Smith	6	6
(Canada) Louise Brown	1	1
(France) Michelle Bourbonnais	4	1
Q	(Sweden) Katarina Bartholdson	6	6
(Belgium) Christiane Mercelis	1	2
(United States) Carole Caldwell	6	6
(Argentina) Norma Baylon	6	3	6
(France) Janine Lieffrig	4	6	2

Third round
1	(Australia) M Smith	6	6
Q	(Sweden) K Bartholdson	1	0
(United States) C Caldwell	6	3	3
(Argentina) N Baylon	0	6	6

Fourth round
1	(Australia) M Smith	6	6
(Argentina) N Baylon	3	3

==== Section 2 ====
First round

Second round
8	(South Africa) Renée Schuurman	4	6	6
(United Kingdom) Deidre Catt	6	4	4
(Sweden) Gudrun Rosin	6	3
(Italy) Francesca Gordigiani	8	6
(West Germany) Renate Ostermann	6	6
(United Kingdom) Jenny Wagstaff	3	4
(Netherlands) Jenny Ridderhof-Seven	7	4	5
(Switzerland) Janine Bourgnon	5	6	7

Third round
8	(South Africa) R Schuurman	6	6
(Italy) F Gordigiani	2	1
(West Germany) R Ostermann	6	6
(Switzerland) J Bourgnon	1	2

Fourth round
8	(South Africa) R Schuurman	6	6
(West Germany) R Ostermann	4	2

==== Section 3 ====
First round
4	(United States) Darlene Hard	6	6
Q	(United Kingdom) Joyce Fulton	0	0
(United Kingdom) Caroline Yates-Bell	6	6
Q	(United Kingdom) Margaret Lee	1	2
(Spain) Pilar Barril	2	0
(West Germany) Helga Schultze	6	6
(West Germany) Heide Schildknecht	4	5
(United Kingdom) Hazel Cheadle	6	7
(United States) Pat Edrich	1	1
(Hungary) Zsuzsa Körmöczy	6	6
(United Kingdom) Christine Truman	6	6
(Mexico) Yola Ochoa	2	0
(Italy) Lucia Bassi	1	5
(Australia) Judy Tegart	6	7
(Soviet Union) Anna Dmitrieva	6	6
(Italy) Roberta Beltrame	1	2

Second round
4	(United States) D Hard	6	6
(United Kingdom) C Yates-Bell	2	1
(West Germany) H Schultze	6	6
(United Kingdom) H Cheadle	1	3
(Hungary) Z Körmöczy	1	3
(United Kingdom) C Truman	6	6
(Australia) J Tegart	6	6
(Soviet Union) A Dmitrieva	1	4

Third round
4	(United States) D Hard	6	6
(West Germany) H Schultze	3	0
(United Kingdom) C Truman	8	0	6
(Australia) J Tegart	6	6	1

Fourth round
4	(United States) D Hard	3	6	8
(United Kingdom) C Truman	6	3	6

==== Section 4 ====
First round
5	(Australia) Jan Lehane	6	6
Q	(United Kingdom) Sally Holdsworth	2	0
(United Kingdom) Joyce Barclay	2	5
Q	(Sweden) Ulla Sandulf	6	2^{r}
(United States) Tory Fretz	6	6
(United States) Carol-Ann Prosen	1	1
Q	(United Kingdom) Diane Tuckey	4	1
(France) Françoise Dürr	6	6
(West Germany) Almut Sturm	1	1
(United Kingdom) Rita Bentley	6	6
(United Kingdom) Pauline Roberts	5	2
(South Africa) Margaret Hunt	7	6
(South Africa) Pam Watermeyer	2	2
(United States) Carol Hanks	6	6
(United Kingdom) Jill Mills	5	3
(United Kingdom) Shirley Brasher	7	6

Second round
5	(Australia) J Lehane	6	6
(United Kingdom) J Barclay	3	2
(United States) T Fretz	8	1	9
(France) F Dürr	6	6	7
(United Kingdom) R Bentley	2	3
(South Africa) M Hunt	6	6
(United States) C Hanks	6	6
(United Kingdom) S Brasher	0	2

Third round
5	(Australia) J Lehane	8	6
(United States) T Fretz	6	4
(South Africa) M Hunt	4	6	8
(United States) C Hanks	6	2	6

Fourth round
5	(Australia) J Lehane	6	6
(South Africa) M Hunt	1	3

=== Bottom half ===
==== Section 5 ====
First round
(South Africa) Charlene Rigby	0	4
(Italy) Silvana Lazzarino	6	6
(United States) Dorothy Knode	6	6
(United Kingdom) Ann McAlpine	2	1
(West Germany) Helga Niessen	6	4	6
(Australia) Carole Newman	3	6	4
(United States) Mary Habicht	4	0
(United Kingdom) Lorna Cawthorn	6	6
(United Kingdom) Carole Rosser	2	9	6
(Australia) Noelene Turner	6	7	8
(United States) Donna Fales	6	6
(Canada) Ann Barclay	3	2
(Spain) Carmen Coronado	6	4	6
(United States) Constance Jaster	2	6	0
(United States) Jane Albert	4	4
6	(Czechoslovakia) Věra Suková	6	6

Second round
(Italy) S Lazzarino	4	6	4
(United States) D Knode	6	3	6
(West Germany) H Niessen	2	5
(United Kingdom) L Cawthorn	6	7
(Australia) N Turner	1	1
(United States) D Fales	6	6
(Spain) C Coronado	6	1	4
6	(Czechoslovakia) V Suková	2	6	6

Third round
(United States) D Knode	3	5
(United Kingdom) L Cawthorn	6	7
(United States) D Fales
6	(Czechoslovakia) V Suková	w/o

Fourth round
(United Kingdom) L Cawthorn	0	4
(United States) D Fales	6	6

==== Section 6 ====
First round
Q	(United Kingdom) Heather Allen	6	3	3
(France) Isabelle de Lansalut	3	6	6
(United States) Judy Alvarez	6	4
(Australia) Robin Lesh	8	6
Q	(United Kingdom) Mary McAnally	0	1
(Australia) Robyn Ebbern	6	6
Q	(Australia) Jean Barnes	6	6
(Hungary) Klára Bardóczy	1	4
(Canada) Hanna Sladek	6	6
(France) Márta Peterdy-Wolf	2	3
(United Kingdom) Jenny Trewby	5	2
(United Kingdom) Jean Knight	7	6
(South Africa) Heather Segal	6	4
(United Kingdom) Virginia Wade	8	6
(Australia) Jill Blackman	3	2
3	(United Kingdom) Ann Jones	6	6

Second round
(France) I de Lansalut	2	2
(Australia) R Lesh	6	6
(Australia) R Ebbern	6	6
Q	(Australia) J Barnes	0	2
(Canada) H Sladek	3	6	6
(United Kingdom) J Knight	6	3	3
(United Kingdom) V Wade	3	7
3	(United Kingdom) A Jones	6	9

Third round
(Australia) R Lesh	3	6
(Australia) R Ebbern	6	8
(Canada) H Sladek	1	0
3	(United Kingdom) A Jones	6	6

Fourth round
(Australia) R Ebbern	2	4
3	(United Kingdom) A Jones	6	6

==== Section 7 ====
First round

Second round
(United Kingdom) Liz Starkie	6	6
(Spain) Ana María Estalella	4	0
(Hungary) Zsófia Broszmann	6	5	4
(Netherlands) Eva de Jong	4	7	6
(United Kingdom) Rosemary Deloford	3	4
(South Africa) Annette Van Zyl	6	6
(Pakistan) Parveen Ahmed	0	0
7	(Brazil) Maria Bueno	6	6

Third round
(United Kingdom) E Starkie	6	6
(Netherlands) E de Jong	0	1
(South Africa) A Van Zyl	2	0
7	(Brazil) M Bueno	6	6

Fourth round
(United Kingdom) E Starkie	1	5
7	(Brazil) M Bueno	6	7

==== Section 8 ====
First round

Second round
(Austria) Sonja Pachta	4	4
(United States) Billie Jean Moffitt	6	6
(Italy) Lea Pericoli	6	6
(United Kingdom) Pat Hird	2	1
Q	(United Kingdom) Judy Tee	1	3
(West Germany) Edda Buding	6	6
(West Germany) Margot Dohrer	1	3
2	(Australia) Lesley Turner	6	6

Third round
(United States) BJ Moffitt	7	6	6
(Italy) L Pericoli	9	4	0
(West Germany) E Buding	4	3
2	(Australia) L Turner	6	6

Fourth round
(United States) BJ Moffitt	4	6	7
2	(Australia) L Turner	6	4	5

Preceded by 1963 French Championships – Women's singles	Grand Slam women's singles	Succeeded by 1963 U.S. National Championships – Women's singles
