= Noelene Turner =

Australian tennis player

- Country (sports): Australia
- Plays: Right-handed

Singles

Grand Slam singles results
- Australian Open: 2R (1960, 1961)
- French Open: 3R (1963)
- Wimbledon: 2R (1963)

Doubles

Grand Slam doubles results
- Australian Open: QF (1960, 1961)
- French Open: 2R (1963)
- Wimbledon: QF (1963)

Grand Slam mixed doubles results
- Australian Open: QF (1960)
- French Open: 2R (1963)
- Wimbledon: 3R (1963)

Noelene Turner is an Australian former tennis player.

Turner, one of six siblings, comes from a tennis playing family. She is the eldest of four sisters which includes Roland Garros winner Lesley Turner. Another sister Patricia was a good junior player. Their mother, competing under her maiden name Tosh, was a New South Wales Hardcourt champion.

In 1963, Turner toured Europe and was a women's doubles quarter-finalist at Wimbledon. She made the singles third round of the 1963 French Championships, along the way beating Australia's seventh ranked player Judy Tegart.

Turner was the 1963 Malayan singles champion.
