= 1964 Australian Championships =

- Date: 4–13 January 1964
- Edition: 52nd
- Category: Grand Slam (ITF)
- Surface: Grass
- Location: Brisbane, Australia
- Venue: Milton Courts

Champions

Men's singles
- (Australia) Roy Emerson

Women's singles
- (Australia) Margaret Smith

Men's doubles
- (Australia) Bob Hewitt / (Australia) Fred Stolle

Women's doubles
- (Australia) Judy Tegart / (Australia) Lesley Turner

Mixed doubles
- (Australia) Margaret Smith / (Australia) Ken Fletcher
← 1963 ·	Australian Championships	· 1965 →

The 1964 Australian Championships was a tennis tournament that took place on outdoor grass courts at the Milton Courts in Brisbane, Australia from 4 January to 13 January. It was the 52nd edition of the Australian Championships (now known as the Australian Open), the 6th held in Brisbane, and the first Grand Slam tournament of the year. The singles titles were won by Australians Roy Emerson and Margaret Smith.

== Champions ==
=== Men's singles ===
(Australia) Roy Emerson defeated (Australia) Fred Stolle 6–3, 6–4, 6–2

=== Women's singles ===
(Australia) Margaret Smith defeated (Australia) Lesley Turner 6–3, 6–2

=== Men's doubles ===
(Australia) Bob Hewitt / (Australia) Fred Stolle defeated (Australia) Roy Emerson / (Australia) Ken Fletcher 6–4, 7–5, 3–6, 4–6, 14–12

=== Women's doubles ===
(Australia) Judy Tegart / (Australia) Lesley Turner defeated (Australia) Robyn Ebbern / (Australia) Margaret Smith 6–4, 6–4

=== Mixed doubles ===
(Australia) Margaret Smith / (Australia) Ken Fletcher defeated (Australia) Jan Lehane / (United Kingdom) Mike Sangster 6–3, 6–2

Preceded by 1963 U.S. National Championships	Grand Slams	Succeeded by 1964 French Championships
