= Jenny Ridderhof =

Dutch tennis player

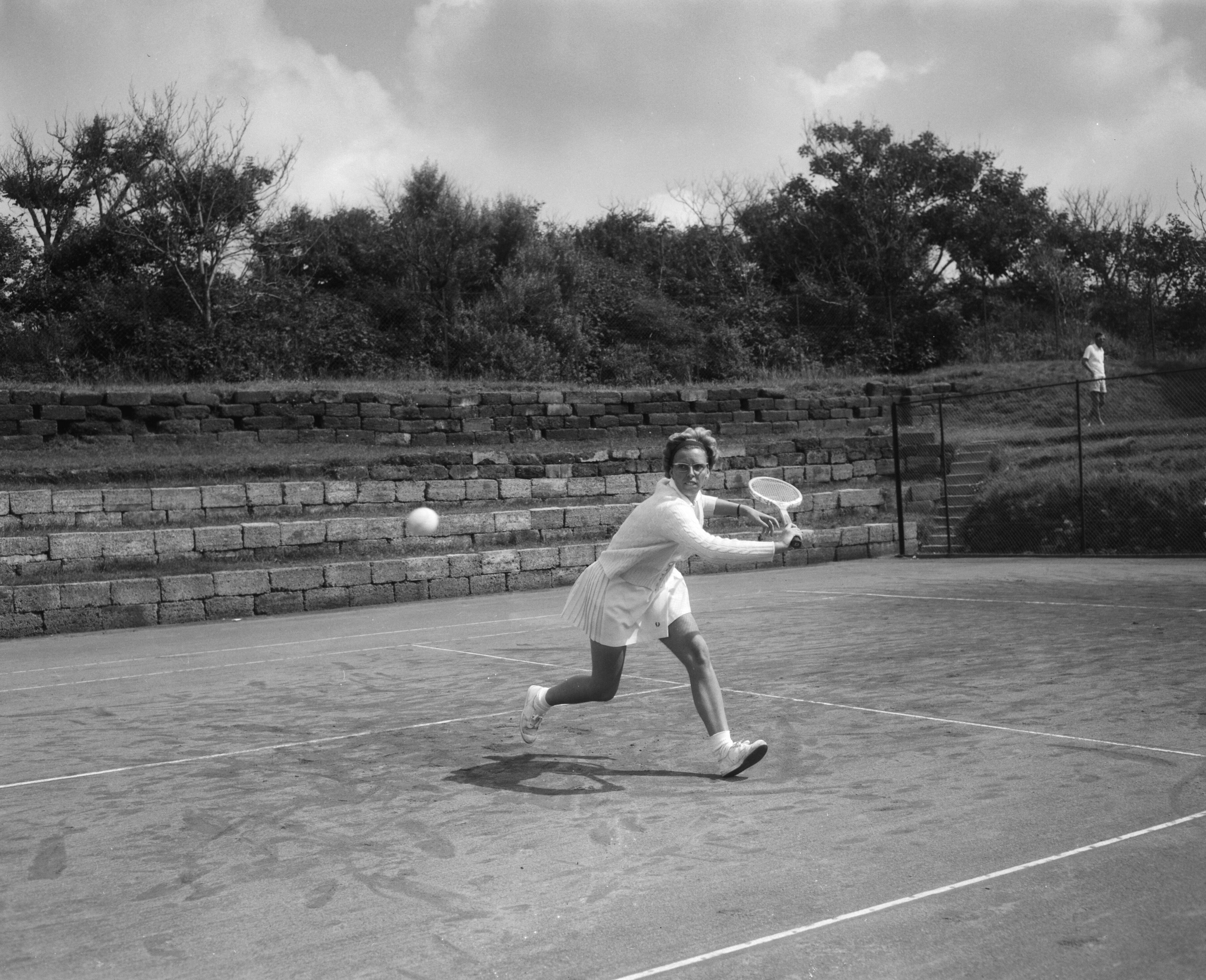
- Full name: Jenny Ridderhof-Seven
- Country (sports): Netherlands
- Born: 24 October 1936
- Died: 2014 (aged 77)

Singles

Grand Slam singles results
- French Open: 1R (1963)
- Wimbledon: 2R (1963)
- US Open: 1R (1963)

Doubles

Grand Slam doubles results
- French Open: 1R (1963)
- Wimbledon: 3R (1962, 1963)

Grand Slam mixed doubles results
- French Open: 1R (1963)
- Wimbledon: 3R (1962)
- US Open: 1R (1963)

Jenny Ridderhof-Seven (24 October 1936 — 2014) was a Dutch tennis player.

Active during the 1960s, Ridderhof was associated with the ELTV club in Eindhoven. She won the Dutch national singles championship in 1963 and appeared in two ties that year for the Netherlands Federation Cup team. In 1968 she was non-playing captain of the Dutch side which made the Federation Cup final, losing to Australia.

Ridderhof originally competed under her maiden name Seven before she married Frans Ridderhof in 1961.

== See also ==
- List of Netherlands Fed Cup team representatives
