= 1963 French Championships – Women's singles =

Women's singles
- 1963 French Championships

Final
- Champion: (Australia) Lesley Turner
- Runner-up: (United Kingdom) Ann Jones
- Score: 2–6, 6–3, 7–5

Details
- Seeds: 16

Events
| Singles | men | women |
| Doubles | men | women |
| ← 1962 · | French Championships | · 1964 → |

Second-seeded Lesley Turner defeated fifth-seeded Ann Jones 2–6, 6–3, 7–5 in the final to win the women's singles tennis title at the 1963 French Championships.

== Seeds ==
The seeded players are listed below. Lesley Turner is the champion; others show the round in which they were eliminated.

1. (Australia) Margaret Smith (quarterfinals)
2. (Australia) Lesley Turner (champion)
3. (United States) Darlene Hard (second round)
4. (Australia) Jan Lehane (quarterfinals)
5. (United Kingdom) Ann Jones (finalist)
6. (South Africa) Heather Segal (fourth round)
7. (South Africa) Renée Schuurman (third round)
8. (Czechoslovakia) Vera Suková (semifinals)
9. (France) Françoise Dürr (fourth round)
10. (Australia) Jill Blackman (quarterfinals)
11. (United Kingdom) Christine Truman (semifinals)
12. (United States) Mary Habicht (fourth round)
13. (United Kingdom) Liz Starkie (third round)
14. (Australia) Robyn Ebbern (quarterfinals)
15. (United Kingdom) Rita Bentley (third round)
16. (Italy) Silvana Lazzarino (second round)

== Draw ==
=== Key ===
- Q = Qualifier
- WC = Wild card
- LL = Lucky loser
- r = Retired

=== Finals ===
Quarterfinals
1 | (Australia) Margaret Smith | 3 | 6
8 | (Czechoslovakia) Vera Suková | 6 | 8
4 | (Australia) Jan Lehane | 0 | 0
5 | (United Kingdom) Ann Jones | 6 | 6
11 | (United Kingdom) Christine Truman | 6 | 6
14 | (Australia) Robyn Ebbern | 0 | 2
10 | (Australia) Jill Blackman | 4 | 4
2 | (Australia) Lesley Turner | 6 | 6

Semifinals
8 | (Czechoslovakia) Vera Suková | 0 | 1
5 | (United Kingdom) Ann Jones | 6 | 6
11 | (United Kingdom) Christine Truman | 9 | 2
2 | (Australia) Lesley Turner | 11 | 6

Finals
5 | (United Kingdom) Ann Jones | 6 | 3 | 5
2 | (Australia) Lesley Turner | 2 | 6 | 7

=== Earlier rounds ===
==== Section 1 ====
First round

Second round
1 | (Australia) Smith
(United States) Brown
(Italy) Beltrame | 4 | 4
(France) Salfati | 6 | 6
16 | (Italy) Lazzarino
(France) Berson
(Belgium) Maréchal | 4 | 4
(Morocco) Repoux | 6 | 6

Third round
1 | (Australia) Smith | 6 | 7
(France) Salfati | 1 | 5
(France) Berson | 4 | 4
(Morocco) Repoux | 6 | 6

Fourth round
1 | (Australia) Smith | 6 | 6
(Morocco) Repoux | 1 | 2

==== Section 2 ====
First round

Second round
8 | (Czechoslovakia) Suková | 9 | 6
(France) Le Besnerais | 7 | 2
(Mexico) Ochoa
(France) Seghers
9 | (France) Dürr
(Belgium) Bellens
(United States) Fretz | 6 | 6 | 1
(France) De Lansalut | 3 | 8 | 6

Third round
8 | (Czechoslovakia) Suková | 6 | 6
(France) Seghers | 3 | 0
9 | (France) Dürr | 6 | 6
(France) De Lansalut | 4 | 2

Fourth round
8 | (Czechoslovakia) Suková | 2 | 6 | 6
9 | (France) Dürr | 6 | 3 | 0

==== Section 3 ====
First round

Second round
4 | (Australia) Lehane | 6 | 6
(France) Galtier | 0 | 4
(United Kingdom) Barclay | 8 | 2 | 6
(France) Langanay | 6 | 6 | 4
13 | (United Kingdom) Starkie
(Sweden) Rosin
(France) Kermina | 7 | 5 | 5
(United States) Alvarez | 5 | 7 | 7

Third round
4 | (Australia) Lehane | 6 | 6
(United Kingdom) Barclay | 0 | 0
13 | (United Kingdom) Starkie | 6 | 5 | 4
(United States) Alvarez | 3 | 7 | 3^{r}

Fourth round
4 | (Australia) Lehane | 6 | 6
(United States) Alvarez | 2 | 3

==== Section 4 ====
First round
(France) Varin | 2 | 4
(Italy) Gordigiani | 6 | 6
(Australia) De Jong | 2 | 1
(West Germany) Schultze | 6 | 6
(Australia) Newman | 8 | 4 | 6
(France) Boulle | 6 | 6 | 3
(Hungary) Körmöczy
(France) Rouire
(France) Wild | 0 | r
12 | (United States) Habicht | 4
(Australia) Turner | 6 | 7
(France) Hamelin | 4 | 5
(Australia) Tegart
(United Kingdom) Truman

Second round
5 | (United Kingdom) Jones | 6 | 6
(Italy) Gordigiani | 0 | 1
(West Germany) Schultze | 6 | 6
(Australia) Newman | 4 | 2
(France) Rouire | 3 | 1
12 | (United States) Habicht | 6 | 6
(Australia) Turner | 6 | 3 | 6
(Australia) Tegart | 2 | 6 | 3

Third round
5 | (United Kingdom) Jones | 6 | 6
(West Germany) Schultze | 1 | 3
12 | (United States) Habicht | 8 | 7
(Australia) Turner | 6 | 5

Fourth round
5 | (United Kingdom) Jones | 6 | 6
12 | (United States) Habicht | 0 | 0

==== Section 5 ====
First round
(South Africa) Hunt | 6 | 6
Peterdy-Wolf | 3 | 2
(Canada) Berner | 6 | 4 | 7
(France) Dusapt | 4 | 6 | 5
(France) Bourbonnais | 4 | 6 | 5
(Spain) Coronado | 6 | 1 | 7
(France) Nenot
11 | (United Kingdom) Truman
(France) Tacchini | 3 | 7
(Australia) Dening | 6 | 9
(France) Spinoza | 6 | 6
(Australia) Howe | 0 | 2
(United Kingdom) Cawthorn | 6 | 6
(West Germany) Schildknecht | 4 | 1
(Netherlands) Ridderhof-Seven | 3 | 3
6 | (South Africa) Segal | 6 | 6

Second round
(South Africa) Hunt | 6 | 6
(Canada) Berner | 1 | 1
(Spain) Coronado | 4 | 2
11 | (United Kingdom) Truman | 6 | 6
(Australia) Dening | 5 | 5
(France) Spinoza | 7 | 7
(United Kingdom) Cawthorn | 2 | 4
6 | (South Africa) Segal | 6 | 6

Third round
(South Africa) Hunt | 0 | 1
11 | (United Kingdom) Truman | 6 | 6
(France) Spinoza | 3 | 2
6 | (South Africa) Segal | 6 | 6

Fourth round
11 | (United Kingdom) Truman | 6 | 6
6 | (South Africa) Segal | 2 | 0

==== Section 6 ====
First round

Second round
(Italy) Bassi | 6 | 6
(United States) Prosen | 0 | 3
(France) Darmon
14 | (Australia) Ebbern
(South Africa) Kavnat | 1 | 1
(France) Rees-Lewis | 6 | 6
(United Kingdom) Blakelock | 13 | 1 | 8
3 | (United States) Hard | 11 | 6 | 6

Third round
(Italy) Bassi | 0 | 3
14 | (Australia) Ebbern | 6 | 6
(France) Rees-Lewis | 6 | 7
(United Kingdom) Blakelock | 4 | 5

Fourth round
14 | (Australia) Ebbern | 7 | 6
(France) Rees-Lewis | 5 | 2

==== Section 7 ====
First round

Second round
(United States) Edrich | 7 | 3
(France) Courteix | 9 | 6
10 | (Australia) Blackman | 0 | 6 | 6
(France) Lieffrig | 6 | 2 | 3
(South Africa) Van Zyl | 7 | 4 | 6
(France) Morales | 5 | 6 | 2
(United Kingdom) Rosser | 5 | 2
7 | (South Africa) Schuurman | 7 | 6

Third round
(France) Courteix | 4 | 4
10 | (Australia) Blackman | 6 | 6
(South Africa) Van Zyl | 6 | 8
7 | (South Africa) Schuurman | 3 | 6

Fourth round
10 | (Australia) Blackman | 6 | 6
(South Africa) Van Zyl | 3 | 3

==== Section 8 ====
First round

Second round
(France) Galtier | 1 | 1
(Argentina) Baylon | 6 | 6
(West Germany) Ostermann
15 | (United Kingdom) Bentley
(Austria) Pachta
(Belgium) Mercelis
(France) Rouchon | 1 | 0
2 | (Australia) Turner | 6 | 6

Third round
(Argentina) Baylon | 6 | 6
15 | (United Kingdom) Bentley | 2 | 4
(Belgium) Mercelis | 4 | 5
2 | (Australia) Turner | 6 | 7

Fourth round
(Argentina) Baylon | 3 | 2
2 | (Australia) Turner | 6 | 6

| Preceded by 1963 Australian Championships – Women's singles | Grand Slam women's singles | Succeeded by 1963 Wimbledon Championships – Women's singles |
