= Ann Barclay =

Canadian tennis player

- Country (sports): Canada
- Born: January 31, 1940 (age 85)

Singles

Grand Slam singles results
- Wimbledon: 1R (1963)
- US Open: 1R (1963)

Doubles

Grand Slam doubles results
- Wimbledon: 2R (1963)

Grand Slam mixed doubles results
- Wimbledon: 2R (1963)

Ann Barclay (born January 31, 1940) is a Canadian former tennis player.

Barclay, younger sister of tennis player Lawrence, is a native of Vancouver, British Columbia.

The top ranked Canadian women's player of the early 1960s, Barclay was singles champion at the Canadian Open in 1962 and 1963. She was part of the inaugural edition of the Federation Cup in 1963, representing Canada in a tie against Great Britain at Queen's Club. While in England she also competed in the Wimbledon Championships for the only time. She was a 1994 inductee into the Canadian Tennis Hall of Fame.

== See also ==
- List of Canada Fed Cup team representatives
