= Hana Sládková-Koželuhová =

Czech former tennis player (born 1928)

- Country (sports): Czechoslovakia; Canada
- Born: 5 December 1928; Prague, Czechoslovakia

Singles

Grand Slam singles results
- Wimbledon: 3R (1963)

Doubles

Grand Slam doubles results
- Wimbledon: 2R (1954)

Grand Slam mixed doubles results
- Wimbledon: 2R (1954)

Hana Sládková-Koželuhová (born 5 December 1928) is a Czech former tennis player.

Born in Prague, Sladek left Czechoslovakia soon after the communist takeover. She initially fled to West Berlin, before settling in Montreal in 1952, with her husband Milan and father Antonín (a brother of tennis player Karel Koželuh).

While based in Canada in the 1950s she used the surname "Sladek". She was a number one ranked player in Canada and won the 1955 Canadian national championships singles title.

Sladek was runner-up to Shirley Brasher at the All England Plate in 1959 and had a notable win that year over Yola Ramírez in an early round of the German international championships.

By the 1960s, Sladek was living back in Europe and in 1963 she progressed to the singles third round of the Wimbledon Championships for the only time, losing to the third-seeded Ann Jones.
