= Renate Ostermann =

German tennis player

- Country (sports): West Germany
- Born: 14 June 1937
- Died: 26 December 2015 (aged 78)
- Plays: Right-handed

Singles

Grand Slam singles results
- French Open: 2R (1963)
- Wimbledon: 4R (1960, 1963)
- US Open: 1R (1962)

Renate Ostermann (14 June 1937 – 26 December 2015) was a German tennis player.

Ostermann, who came from Krefeld, twice made the round of 16 in singles at Wimbledon.

In 1963 she featured in West Germany's first ever Federation Cup tie, partnering Edda Buding in the doubles rubber, which they lost to France's Françoise Dürr and Janine Lieffrig.
