= Mary Habicht =

American tennis player

- Country (sports): United States
- Born: December 10, 1943 (age 81)
- Plays: Left-handed

Singles

Grand Slam singles results
- French Open: 4R (1963)
- Wimbledon: 3R (1966)
- US Open: 3R (1963)

Mary Habicht (born December 10, 1943) is an American former tennis player.

Habicht, a left-handed player, was active on tour in the 1960s.

An American of German-Irish descent, Habicht was living in São Paulo when she started on tour and some sources have her competing as a Brazilian. She was seeded 12th at the 1963 French Championships and made it to the fourth round, where she lost to Ann Jones. In 1966 she reached third round of the Wimbledon Championships.
