= Robin Lesh =

Australian tennis player (1939–2022)

- Country (sports): Australia
- Born: 22 August 1939
- Died: 5 September 2022 (aged 83)
- Plays: Right-handed

Singles

Grand Slam singles results
- Australian Open: 2R (1961)
- French Open: 3R (1965)
- Wimbledon: 4R (1965)

Doubles

Grand Slam doubles results
- Australian Open: QF (1959)
- French Open: 2R (1965)
- Wimbledon: QF (1963, 1965)

Grand Slam mixed doubles results
- Australian Open: QF (1959)
- French Open: 2R (1964, 1965)
- Wimbledon: 4R (1965)

Robin Lesh (22 August 1939 – 5 September 2022) was an Australian tennis player.

Lesh, a Melbourne based player, made her first European tour in 1963 and had a win over a young Virginia Wade en route to the final of the Cumberland tournament. A two-time Wimbledon doubles quarter-finalist, she also made the fourth round of the singles in 1965, then lost to Billie Jean Moffitt. Her tournament wins include the singles title at Aix-en-Provence in 1965. She married Geelong Grammar teacher John Bedggood.
