= 1963 French Championships (tennis) =

Tennis tournament

- Date: 13–26 May 1963
- Edition: 62
- Category: 33rd Grand Slam (ITF)
- Surface: Clay
- Location: Paris (XVI^{e}), France
- Venue: Stade Roland Garros

Champions

Men's singles
- (Australia) Roy Emerson

Women's singles
- (Australia) Lesley Turner

Men's doubles
- (Australia) Roy Emerson / (Spain) Manuel Santana

Women's doubles
- (United Kingdom) Ann Jones / (South Africa) Renee Schuurman

Mixed doubles
- (Australia) Margaret Smith / (Australia) Ken Fletcher
- French Championships

The 1963 French Championships (now known as the French Open) was a tennis tournament that took place on the outdoor clay courts at the Stade Roland-Garros in Paris, France. The tournament ran from 13 May until 26 May. It was the 62nd staging of the French Championships, and the second Grand Slam tennis event of 1963. Roy Emerson and Lesley Turner won the singles titles.

== Finals ==
=== Men's singles ===
(Australia) Roy Emerson defeated (France) Pierre Darmon 3–6, 6–1, 6–4, 6–4

=== Women's singles ===
(Australia) Lesley Turner defeated (United Kingdom) Ann Jones 2–6, 6–3, 7–5

=== Men's doubles ===
(Australia) Roy Emerson / (Spain) Manuel Santana defeated (South Africa) Gordon Forbes / (South Africa) Abe Segal 6–2, 6–4, 6–4

=== Women's doubles ===
(United Kingdom) Ann Jones / (South Africa) Renée Schuurman defeated (Australia) Robyn Ebbern / (Australia) Margaret Smith 7–5, 6–4

=== Mixed doubles ===
(Australia) Margaret Smith / (Australia) Ken Fletcher defeated (Australia) Lesley Turner / (Australia) Fred Stolle 6–1, 6–2

Preceded by 1963 Australian Championships	Grand Slams	Succeeded by 1963 Wimbledon Championships
