= Lesley Turner Bowrey =

Australian tennis player

Lesley Turner Bowrey AM
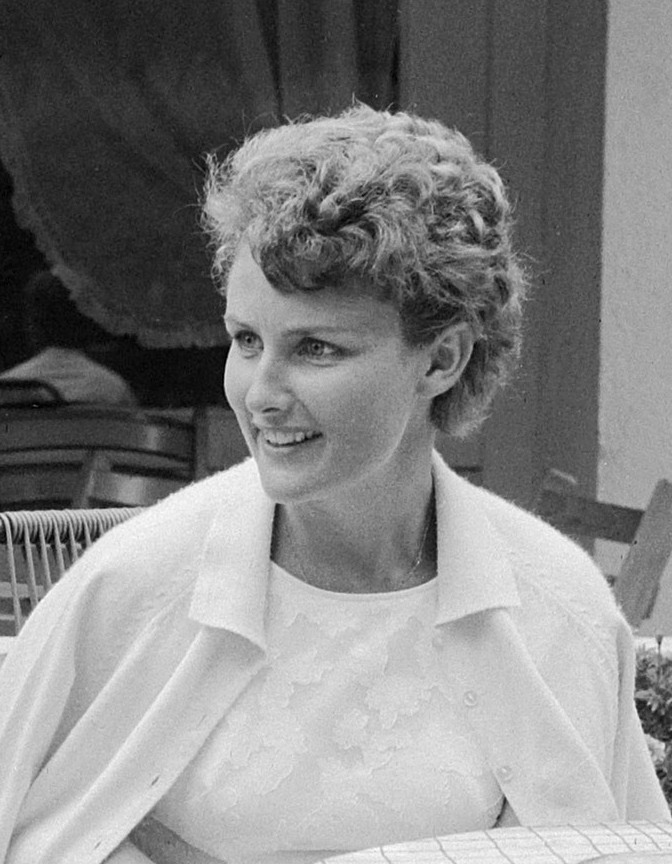
- Turner in 1964
- Full name: Lesley Rosemary Turner Bowrey
- ITF name: Lesley Bowrey
- Country (sports): Australia
- Born: Lesley Rosemary Turner; 16 August 1942 (age 84) Trangie, New South Wales, Australia
- Plays: Right-handed (1-handed backhand)
- Int. Tennis HoF: 1997 (member page)

Singles
- Highest ranking: No. 2 (1964)

Grand Slam singles results
- Australian Open: F (1964, 1967)
- French Open: W (1963, 1965)
- Wimbledon: SF (1964)
- US Open: SF (1967)

Grand Slam doubles results
- Australian Open: W (1964, 1965, 1967)
- French Open: W (1964, 1965)
- Wimbledon: W (1964)
- US Open: W (1961)

Grand Slam mixed doubles results
- Australian Open: W (1962, 1967)
- French Open: F (1962, 1963, 1964)
- Wimbledon: W (1961, 1964)
- US Open: F (1962)

Team competitions
- Fed Cup: W (1964, 1965)

Lesley Rosemary Turner Bowrey, AM (née Turner; born 16 August 1942) is a retired professional tennis player from Australia. Her career spanned two decades from the late 1950s until the late 1970s. Turner Bowrey won the singles title at the French Championships, one of the four Grand Slam events, in 1963 and 1965. In addition she won 11 Grand Slam events in doubles and mixed doubles. Turner Bowrey achieved her highest singles ranking of No. 2 in 1964.

== Career ==
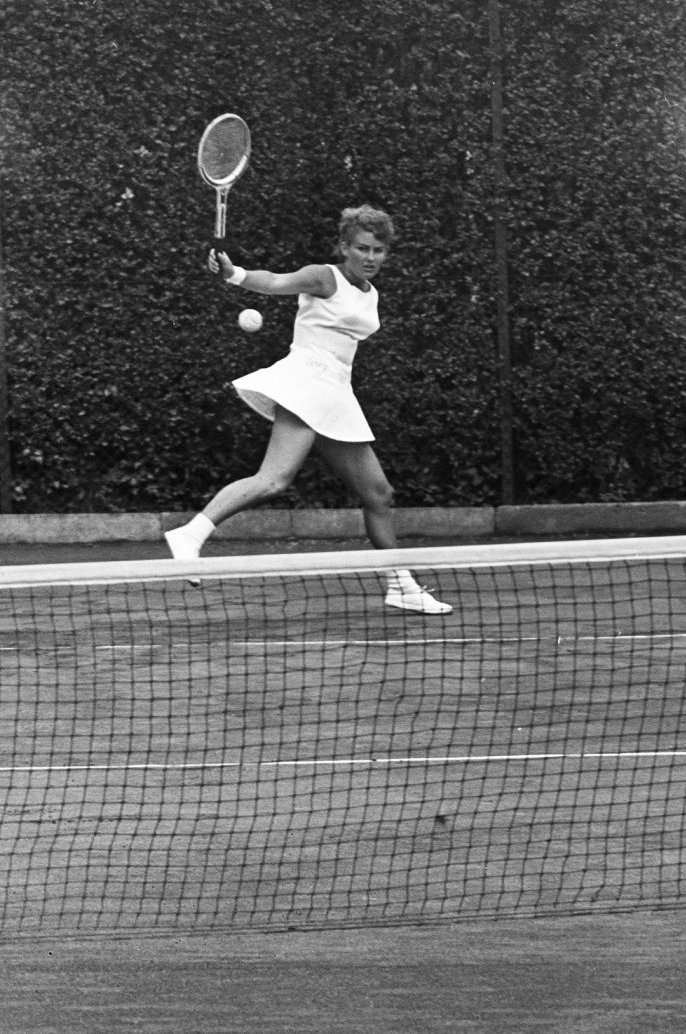
Lesley Turner at the 1964 Dutch Open in Hilversum.

Bowrey won 13 Grand Slam titles during her career: two in singles, seven in women's doubles, and four in mixed doubles. She lost in the finals of 14 other Grand Slam events.

Bowrey twice won the singles title at the French Championships. In 1963, she defeated Ann Haydon-Jones in the final, and in 1965, she defeated Margaret Smith in the final.

Bowrey was the runner-up at four Grand Slam singles tournaments. She lost in the final of the French Championships to Court in 1962 and to Françoise Dürr in 1967. She lost in the final of the Australian Championships to Court in 1964 and to Nancy Richey in 1967.

She was runner-up at the Italian Championships in 1961, 1963 and 1964, and she won the title in 1967 against Maria Bueno and in 1968 against Margaret Court.

Bowrey captained the Australian Fed Cup team from 1994 to 2000.

== Honours and awards ==
Bowrey was inducted into the Sport Australia Hall of Fame in 1985. She was inducted into the NSW Hall of Champions in 1994. She was inducted into the International Tennis Hall of Fame and received the Sarah Palfrey Danzig Award in 1997. The award is given to the female player who by character, sportsmanship, manners, and spirit of cooperation has contributed to the growth of the game of tennis. In 1998 she was inducted into the Australian Tennis Hall of Fame.

In the Queen's Birthday Honours 2009 Bowrey was appointed as Member of the Order of Australia "for service to tennis as a player, coach and mentor to junior players, and to the community".

She married fellow Australian tennis star Bill Bowrey on 23 February 1968. They are the parents of tennis player Michelle Bowrey.

== Grand Slam finals ==
=== Singles: 6 (2 titles, 4 runners-up) ===
Result	Year	Championship	Surface	Opponent	Score
Loss	1962	French Championships	Clay	(Australia) Margaret Smith	3–6, 6–3, 5–7
Win	1963	French Championships	Clay	(United Kingdom) Ann Haydon-Jones	2–6, 6–3, 7–5
Loss	1964	Australian Championships	Grass	(Australia) Margaret Smith	3–6, 2–6
Win	1965	French Championships (2)	Clay	(Australia) Margaret Smith	6–3, 6–4
Loss	1967	Australian Championships (2)	Grass	(United States) Nancy Richey Gunter	1–6, 4–6
Loss	1967	French Championships (3)	Clay	(France) Françoise Dürr	6–4, 3–6, 4–6

=== Doubles: 12 (7 titles, 5 runners-up) ===
Result	Year	Championship	Surface	Partner	Opponents	Score
Win	1961	U.S. Championships	Grass	(United States) Darlene Hard	(West Germany) Edda Buding (Mexico) Yola Ramírez	6–4, 5–7, 6–0
Win	1964	Australian Championships	Grass	(Australia) Judy Tegart	(Australia) Robyn Ebbern (Australia) Margaret Smith	6–4, 6–4
Win	1964	French Championships	Clay	(Australia) Margaret Smith	(Argentina) Norma Baylon (West Germany) Helga Schultze	6–3, 6–1
Win	1964	Wimbledon	Grass	(Australia) Margaret Smith	(United States) Billie Jean Moffitt (United States) Karen Hantze Susman	7–5, 6–2
Loss	1964	U.S. Championships	Grass	(Australia) Margaret Smith	(United States) Billie Jean Moffitt (United States) Karen Hantze Susman	3–6, 6–2, 6–4
Win	1965	Australian Championships (4)	Grass	(Australia) Margaret Smith	(Australia) Robyn Ebbern (United States) Billie Jean Moffitt	1–6, 6–2, 6–3
Win	1965	French Championships (2)	Clay	(Australia) Margaret Smith	(France) Françoise Dürr (France) Janine Lieffrig	6–3, 6–1
Loss	1966	Australian Championships (3)	Grass	(Australia) Margaret Smith	(United States) Carole Caldwell Graebner (United States) Nancy Richey	6–4, 7–5
Win	1967	Australian Championships (2)	Grass	(Australia) Judy Tegart	(Australia) Lorraine Robinson (France) Évelyne Terras	6–0, 6–2
Loss	1968	Australian Championships	Grass	(Australia) Judy Tegart	(Australia) Karen Krantzcke (Australia) Kerry Melville	4–6, 6–3, 2–6
Loss	1976	Australian Open	Grass	(Czechoslovakia) Renáta Tomanová	(Australia) Evonne Goolagong (Australia) Helen Gourlay	1–8
Loss	1978	French Open	Grass	(France) Gail Sherriff	(Socialist Federal Republic of Yugoslavia) Mima Jaušovec (Romania) Virginia Ruzici	5–7, 6–4, 8–6

=== Mixed doubles: 9 (4 titles, 5 runners-up) ===
Result	Year	Championship	Surface	Partner	Opponents	Score
Win	1961	Wimbledon	Grass	(Australia) Fred Stolle	(West Germany) Edda Buding (Australia) Bob Howe	11–9, 6–2
Win	1962	Australian Championships	Grass	(Australia) Fred Stolle	(United States) Darlene Hard (United Kingdom) Roger Taylor	6–3, 9–4
Loss	1962	French Championships	Clay	(Australia) Fred Stolle	(South Africa) Renée Schuurman (Australia) Bob Howe	6–3, 4–6, 4–6
Loss	1962	U.S. Championships	Grass	(United States) Frank Froehling	(Australia) Margaret Smith (Australia) Fred Stolle	5–7, 2–6
Loss	1963	Australian Championships	Grass	(Australia) Fred Stolle	(Australia) Margaret Smith (Australia) Ken Fletcher	5–7, 7–5, 4–6
Loss	1963	French Championships	Clay	(Australia) Fred Stolle	(Australia) Margaret Smith (Australia) Ken Fletcher	1–6, 2–6
Loss	1964	French Championships	Clay	(Australia) Fred Stolle	(Australia) Margaret Smith (Australia) Ken Fletcher	3–6, 6–4, 6–8
Win	1964	Wimbledon	Grass	(Australia) Fred Stolle	(Australia) Margaret Smith (Australia) Ken Fletcher	6–4, 6–4
Win	1967	Australian Championships	Grass	(Australia) Owen Davidson	(Australia) Judy Tegart (Australia) Tony Roche	9–7, 6–4

== Grand Slam singles tournament timeline ==
Key
W	F	SF	QF	#R	RR	Q#	DNQ	A	NH

(W) winner; (F) finalist; (SF) semifinalist; (QF) quarterfinalist; (#R) rounds 4, 3, 2, 1; (RR) round-robin stage; (Q#) qualification round; (DNQ) did not qualify; (A) absent; (NH) not held; (SR) strike rate (events won / competed); (W–L) win–loss record.

Tournament	1959	1960	1961	1962	1963	1964	1965	1966	1967	1968	1969	1970	1971	1972	1973	1974	1975	1976	1977		1978	Career SR
Australia	QF	2R	3R	QF	SF	F	3R	3R	F	SF	2R	A	2R	A	3R	A	1R	QF	1R	A	A	0 / 16
France	A	A	4R	F	W	SF	W	A	F	A	SF	A	QF	A	A	A	A	A	A		3R	2 / 9
Wimbledon	A	A	2R	QF	4R	SF	QF	A	QF	QF	QF	A	4R	A	A	A	A	A	A		2R	0 / 10
United States	A	A	QF	4R	A	2R	A	A	SF	A	2R	A	A	A	2R	A	A	A	A		A	0 / 6
SR	0 / 1	0 / 1	0 / 4	0 / 4	1 / 3	0 / 4	1 / 3	0 / 1	0 / 4	0 / 2	0 / 4	0 / 0	0 / 3	0 / 0	0 / 2	0 / 0	0 / 1	0 / 1	0 / 1		0 / 2	2 / 41

Note: The Australian Open was held twice in 1977, in January and December. Bowrey participated only in the January edition.

== See also ==
- Performance timelines for all female tennis players since 1978 who reached at least one Grand Slam final
