= Judy Tegart-Dalton =

Australian tennis player

Judy Tegart-Dalton AM
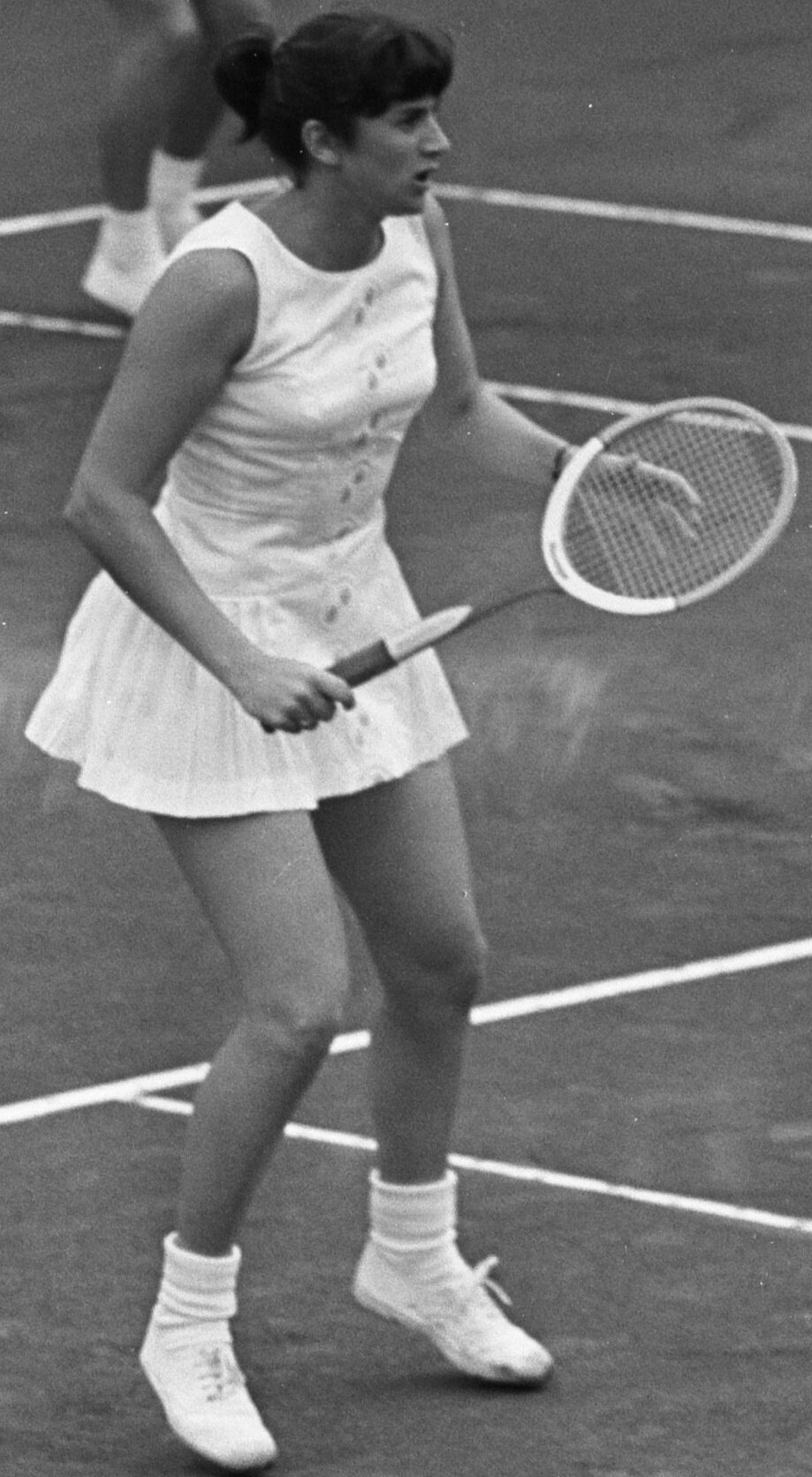
- Judy Tegart (1965)
- Full name: Judith Anne Marshall Tegart-Dalton
- Country (sports): Australia
- Born: 12 December 1937 (age 88) Melbourne, Australia

Singles
- Career record: 591-284 (67.5%)
- Career titles: 35
- Highest ranking: No. 7 (1968)

Grand Slam singles results
- Australian Open: SF (1968)
- French Open: 4R (1966, 1967)
- Wimbledon: F (1968)
- US Open: QF (1968, 1971)

Doubles
- Career record: no value

Grand Slam doubles results
- Australian Open: W (1964, 1967, 1969, 1970)
- French Open: W (1966)
- Wimbledon: W (1969)
- US Open: W (1970, 1971)

Grand Slam mixed doubles results
- Australian Open: W (1966)
- Wimbledon: F (1965, 1969)
- US Open: F (1963, 1964, 1965, 1970)

Team competitions
- Fed Cup: W (1965, 1970)

Judy Tegart-Dalton AM (née Tegart; born 12 December 1937) is an Australian former professional tennis player. She won nine major doubles titles, and completed the career Grand Slam in women's doubles. Five of her doubles titles were with Margaret Court. Tegart was also a runner-up in 10 major doubles tournaments.

== Career ==
Tegart reached the final at Wimbledon in 1968, where she lost to Billie Jean King in two tight sets after defeating second-seeded Court in the quarterfinal and third-seeded Nancy Richey in the semifinal. She also reached the singles semifinals at Wimbledon in 1971 at the age of 33, losing to Court in three sets, and at the Australian Championships in 1968, losing to King in three sets. Her last appearance at a Grand Slam tournament was the 1977 Australian Open, where at the age of 40 she lost in the quarterfinals in straight sets to top-seeded and eventual champion Evonne Goolagong Cawley.

Tegart won the singles, doubles and mixed doubles titles at the 1969 German Open Championships in Hamburg. In the singles final, she defeated Helga Niessen in straight sets.

Tegart was unusual in that she did not reach the quarterfinals of a Grand Slam singles tournament outside of Australia until she was 29 years of age. From Wimbledon in 1967 until the end of her career, she reached at least the quarterfinals in half of the Grand Slam singles tournaments she played (10 out of 20).

Tegart was a member of the Australian Federation Cup team in 1965, 1966, 1967, 1969, and 1970. Her career won-loss record was 18–4, including 6–1 in singles and 12–3 in doubles. Australia won the Federation Cup in 1965 and 1970.

Tegart was one of the original "Virginia Slims 9", the nine players who in 1971 joined the break-away Virginia Slims tour organised by Gladys Heldman. She married Dr. David Dalton on 18 November 1969.

Tegart was made a Member of the Order of Australia (AM) in the 2019 Australia Day Honours for "significant service to tennis as a player, to equality for women in sport, and to sporting foundations". She was inducted onto the Victorian Honour Roll of Women in the same year.

== Grand Slam finals ==
=== Singles: 1 final (1 runner-up) ===
Result	Year	Championship	Surface	Opponent	Score
Loss	1968	Wimbledon	Grass	(United States) Billie Jean King	7–9, 5–7

=== Women's doubles: 11 finals (8 titles, 3 runners-up) ===
Result	Year	Championship	Surface	Partner	Opponents	Score
Win	1964	Australian Championships	Grass	(Australia) Lesley Turner	(Australia) Robyn Ebbern (Australia) Margaret Smith	6–4, 6–4
Win	1966	French Championships	Clay	(Australia) Margaret Smith	(Australia) Jill Blackman (Australia) Fay Toyne	4–6, 6–1, 6–1
Loss	1966	Wimbledon	Grass	(Australia) Margaret Smith	(Brazil) Maria Bueno (United States) Nancy Richey	3–6, 6–4, 4–6
Win	1967	Australian Championships (2)	Grass	(Australia) Lesley Turner	(Australia) Lorraine Robinson (France) Évelyne Terras	6–0, 6–2
Loss	1968	Australian Championships	Grass	(Australia) Lesley Turner	(Australia) Karen Krantzcke (Australia) Kerry Melville	4–6, 6–3, 2–6
Win	1969	Australian Open (3)	Grass	(Australia) Margaret Court	(United States) Rosemary Casals (United States) Billie Jean King	6–4, 6–4
Win	1969	Wimbledon	Grass	(Australia) Margaret Court	(United States) Patti Hogan (United States) Peggy Michel	9–7, 6–2
Win	1970	Australian Open (4)	Grass	(Australia) Margaret Court	(Australia) Karen Krantzcke (Australia) Kerry Melville	6–1, 6–3
Win	1970	US Open	Grass	(Australia) Margaret Court	(United States) Rosemary Casals (United Kingdom) Virginia Wade	6–3, 6–4
Win	1971	US Open (2)	Grass	(United States) Rosemary Casals	(France) Gail Chanfreau (France) Françoise Dürr	6–3, 6–3
Loss	1972	Wimbledon	Grass	(France) Françoise Dürr	(United States) Billie Jean King (Netherlands) Betty Stöve	2–6, 6–4, 3–6

=== Mixed doubles: 8 finals (1 title, 7 runners-up) ===
Result	Year	Championship	Surface	Partner	Opponents	Score
Loss	1963	U.S. Championships	Grass	(United States) Ed Rubinoff	(Australia) Margaret Smith (Australia) Ken Fletcher	6–3, 6–8, 2–6
Loss	1964	U.S. Championships	Grass	(United States) Ed Rubinoff	(Australia) Margaret Smith (Australia) John Newcombe	8–10, 6–4, 3–6
Loss	1965	Wimbledon Championships	Grass	(Australia) Tony Roche	(Australia) Margaret Smith (Australia) Ken Fletcher	10–12, 3–6
Loss	1965	U.S. Championships	Grass	(United States) Frank Froehling	(Australia) Margaret Smith (Australia) Fred Stolle	2–6, 2–6
Win	1966	Australian Championships	Grass	(Australia) Tony Roche	(Australia) Robyn Ebbern (Australia) William Bowrey	6–1, 6–3
Loss	1967	Australian Championships	Grass	(Australia) Tony Roche	(Australia) Lesley Turner (Australia) Owen Davidson	7–9, 4–6
Loss	1969	Wimbledon	Grass	(Australia) Tony Roche	(United Kingdom) Ann Haydon (Australia) Fred Stolle	2–6, 3–6
Loss	1970	US Open	Grass	(South Africa) Frew McMillan	(Australia) Margaret Court (United States) Marty Riessen	4–6, 4–6

== Grand Slam singles tournament timeline ==
Key
W	F	SF	QF	#R	RR	Q#	DNQ	A	NH

(W) winner; (F) finalist; (SF) semifinalist; (QF) quarterfinalist; (#R) rounds 4, 3, 2, 1; (RR) round-robin stage; (Q#) qualification round; (DNQ) did not qualify; (A) absent; (NH) not held; (SR) strike rate (events won / competed); (W–L) win–loss record.

Tournament	1957	1958	1959	1960	1961	1962	1963	1964	1965	1966	1967	1968	1969	1970	1971	1972	1973	1974	1975	1976	1977		Career SR
Australia	1R	1R	1R	A	3R	QF	2R	QF	QF	QF	QF	SF	1R	QF	A	A	A	QF	A	1R	1R	QF	0 / 17
France	A	A	A	A	A	3R	2R	4R	A	4R	4R	A	A	2R	A	2R	A	A	A	A	A		0 / 7
Wimbledon	A	A	A	A	A	4R	3R	4R	3R	4R	QF	F	QF	4R	SF	3R	A	A	2R	A	A		0 / 12
United States	A	A	A	A	A	2R	4R	4R	3R	3R	4R	QF	A	3R	QF	A	A	A	A	A	A		0 / 9
SR	0 / 1	0 / 1	0 / 1	0 / 0	0 / 1	0 / 4	0 / 4	0 / 4	0 / 3	0 / 4	0 / 4	0 / 3	0 / 2	0 / 4	0 / 2	0 / 2	0 / 0	0 / 1	0 / 1	0 / 1	0 / 2		0 / 45

Note: The Australian Open was held twice in 1977, in January and December. Dalton participated in both editions.

== See also ==
- Performance timelines for all female tennis players since 1978 who reached at least one Grand Slam final
