= Robyn Ebbern =

Australian tennis player

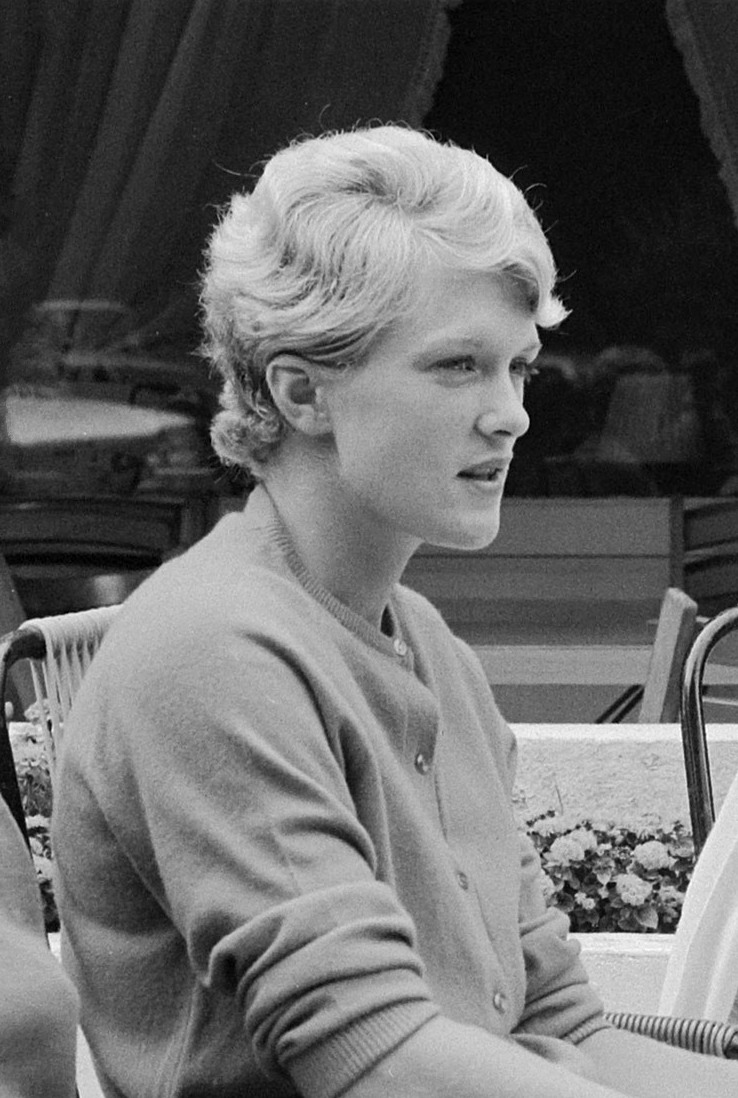
- Ebbern in 1964
- Country (sports): Australia
- Born: 2 July 1944 (age 81); Brisbane, Australia
- Plays: Right-handed

Singles
- Highest ranking: No. 9 (1964)

Grand Slam singles results
- Australian Open: SF (1961, 1963, 1964)
- French Open: QF (1963)
- Wimbledon: QF (1964)
- US Open: QF (1964)

Doubles
- Career record: no value

Grand Slam doubles results
- Australian Open: W (1962, 1963)
- French Open: F (1963)
- US Open: W (1963)

Grand Slam mixed doubles results
- Australian Open: W (1965)
- French Open: 3R (1961, 1963, 1964)
- Wimbledon: 3R (1964)
- US Open: 1R (1964)

Robyn Ebbern (born 2 July 1944) is an Australian former tennis player who was active in the 1960s.

== Biography ==
Born in Brisbane, Ebbern and Margaret Smith won the Australian Championships doubles in 1962 and 1963 and the U.S. Championships doubles in 1963. In the same year in the French Championships, they were defeated in the final by Renée Schuurman and Ann Haydon-Jones. In January 1962, she reached the final of the Tasmanian Championships in which she was defeated by Margaret Smith. In July 1963 she won the singles title at the Swiss Championships, played in Gstaad, defeating Lesley Turner in the final in straight sets. In the doubles final, she teamed up with Turner and won against Renée Schuurman and Norma Baylon. In November 1963, she partnered with Smith to win the South Australian doubles title against Turner and Jan Lehane.

In the 1965 Australian Championships mixed doubles, she and Owen Davidson shared the championship with Court and John Newcombe. The final was not played. In 1966, Ebbern and Bill Bowrey were defeated in the final by Judy Tegart and Tony Roche.

According to Lance Tingay of The Daily Telegraph and the Daily Mail, Ebbern was ranked world No. 9 at year-end in 1964.

== Grand Slam tournaments ==
=== Doubles: 7 (3 titles, 4 runners-up) ===
| Result | Year | Championship | Surface | Partner | Opponents | Score |
|---|---|---|---|---|---|---|
| Win | 1962 | Australian Championships | Grass | (Australia) Margaret Smith | (United States) Darlene Hard (Australia) Mary Carter Reitano | 6–4, 6–4 |
| Win | 1963 | Australian Championships | Grass | (Australia) Margaret Smith | (Australia) Jan Lehane (Australia) Lesley Turner | 6–1, 6–3 |
| Loss | 1963 | French Championships | Clay | (Australia) Margaret Smith | (South Africa) Renée Schuurman (United Kingdom) Ann Haydon-Jones | 7–5, 6–4 |
| Loss | 1963 | Wimbledon Championships | Grass | (Australia) Margaret Smith | (Brazil) Maria Bueno (United States) Darlene Hard | 8–6, 9–7 |
| Win | 1963 | U.S. Championships | Grass | (Australia) Margaret Smith | (Brazil) Maria Bueno (United States) Darlene Hard | 4–6, 10–8, 6–3 |
| Loss | 1964 | Australian Championships | Grass | (Australia) Margaret Smith | (Australia) Judy Tegart (Australia) Lesley Turner | 6–4, 6–4 |
| Loss | 1965 | Australian Championships | Grass | (United States) Billie Jean Moffitt | (Australia) Margaret Smith (Australia) Lesley Turner | 1–6, 6–2, 6–3 |

=== Mixed doubles: 2 (1 title, 1 runner-up) ===
| Result | Year | Championship | Surface | Partner | Opponents | Score |
|---|---|---|---|---|---|---|
| Win | 1965 | Australian Championships | Grass | (Australia) Owen Davidson | (Australia) Margaret Smith (Australia) John Newcombe | Title shared |
| Loss | 1966 | Australian Championships | Grass | (Australia) Bill Bowrey | (Australia) Judy Tegart (Australia) Tony Roche | 1–6, 3–6 |
