= 1961 Wimbledon Championships – Mixed doubles =

Mixed doubles
- 1961 Wimbledon Championships

Final
- Champions: (Australia) Fred Stolle (Australia) Lesley Turner
- Runners-up: (Australia) Bob Howe (West Germany) Edda Buding
- Score: 11–9, 6–2

Details
- Draw: 80 (5Q)
- Seeds: 4

Events
Singles	men	women		boys	girls
Doubles	men	women	mixed	boys	girls
- Wimbledon Championships

Rod Laver and Darlene Hard were the defending champions, but did not compete.

Fred Stolle and Lesley Turner defeated Bob Howe and Edda Buding in the final, 11–9, 6–2 to win the mixed doubles tennis title at the 1961 Wimbledon Championships.

== Seeds ==
1. (Australia) Fred Stolle / (Australia) Lesley Turner (champions)
2. (Argentina) Enrique Morea / (Australia) Margaret Smith (semifinals)
3. (Czechoslovakia) Jiří Javorský / (Czechoslovakia) Věra Suková (semifinals)
4. (Australia) Bob Howe / (West Germany) Edda Buding (final)

Click on the seed number of a player to go to their draw section.

== Draw ==
Key

- Q = Qualifier
- WC = Wild card
- LL = Lucky loser
- Alt = Alternate
- ITF = ITF entry
- PR = Protected ranking
- SR = Special ranking
- SE = Special exempt
- JE = Junior exempt
- JR = Junior Accelerator Programme entrant
- CO = College Accelerator Programme entrant
- NG = Next Gen Accelerator Program entrant
- w/o = Walkover
- r = Retired
- d = Defaulted

=== Finals ===
Quarterfinals
1	(Australia) Fred Stolle (Australia) Lesley Turner	6	6
(Finland) Reino Nyyssönen (Argentina) Nora Somoza	2	0
3	(Czechoslovakia) Jiří Javorský (Czechoslovakia) Věra Suková	6	7	6
(United States) Frank Froehling (United States) Justina Bricka	4	9	4
(United Kingdom) John Barrett (United Kingdom) Billie Woodgate	4	8	4
4	(Australia) Bob Howe (West Germany) Edda Buding	6	6	6
(Australia) Bob Mark (United States) Sally Moore	7	2	1
2	(Argentina) Enrique Morea (Australia) Margaret Smith	5	6	6

Semifinals
1	(Australia) Fred Stolle (Australia) Lesley Turner	7	6
3	(Czechoslovakia) Jiří Javorský (Czechoslovakia) Věra Suková	5	3
4	(Australia) Bob Howe (West Germany) Edda Buding	6	6
2	(Argentina) Enrique Morea (Australia) Margaret Smith	3	2

Final
1	(Australia) Fred Stolle (Australia) Lesley Turner	11	6
4	(Australia) Bob Howe (West Germany) Edda Buding	9	2

=== Top half ===
==== Section 1 ====
First round

Second round
1	(Australia) Fred Stolle (Australia) Lesley Turner	6	6
(Argentina) Federico Mackinlay (Argentina) Mabel Bove	1	2
(Chile) Patricio Rodríguez (Spain) Ana María Estalella	8	7
(United States) Gardnar Mulloy (United Kingdom) Rita Bentley	10	9
(Brazil) Carlos Fernandes (Australia) Margaret Hellyer	1	8	6
(Soviet Union) Toomas Leius (Soviet Union) Valeria Kuzmenko Titova	6	6	2
(Federation of Rhodesia and Nyasaland) Roger Dowdeswell (Australia) Eva Duldig	4	3
(United Kingdom) Geoffrey Paish (France) Susan Chatrier	6	6

Third round
1	(Australia) F Stolle (Australia) L Turner	6	6
(United States) G Mulloy (United Kingdom) R Bentley	2	2
(Brazil) C Fernandes (Australia) M Hellyer	11	4	6
(United Kingdom) G Paish (France) S Chatrier	9	6	4

Fourth round
1	(Australia) F Stolle (Australia) L Turner	7	3	6
(Brazil) C Fernandes (Australia) M Hellyer	5	6	0

==== Section 2 ====
First round

Second round
(Australia) Warren Jacques (Hungary) Márta Peterdy-Wolf	2	2
(Denmark) Jørgen Ulrich (Belgium) Christiane Mercelis	6	6
(United Kingdom) John Maguire (United Kingdom) Frances MacLennan	6	6
(Switzerland) Heinz Grimm (Switzerland) Janine Bourgnon	3	3
(Spain) Emilio Martínez (Spain) Marta Pombo	3	6	9
(India) Narenda Nath (West Germany) Karin Herich	6	1	11
(Finland) Reino Nyyssönen (Argentina) Nora Somoza	6	6
(United States) Kingman Lambert (United States) Mimi Arnold	4	3

Third round
(Denmark) J Ulrich (Belgium) C Mercelis	6	6
(United Kingdom) J Maguire (United Kingdom) F MacLennan	2	4
(India) N Nath (West Germany) K Herich	2	4
(Finland) R Nyyssönen (Argentina) N Somoza	6	6

Fourth round
(Denmark) J Ulrich (Belgium) C Mercelis	6	3
(Finland) R Nyyssönen (Argentina) N Somoza	8	6

==== Section 3 ====
First round

Second round
3	(Czechoslovakia) Jiří Javorský (Czechoslovakia) Věra Suková	6	6
(Socialist Federal Republic of Yugoslavia) Sima Nikolić (Socialist Federal Republic of Yugoslavia) Jelena Genčić	1	3
(United Kingdom) Colin Baxter (United Kingdom) Joyce Barclay	w/o
(United States) Ronnie Holmberg (Italy) Silvana Lazzarino
(Australia) Neil Gibson (Australia) Joan Gibson	6	11
(United Kingdom) Alan Mills (United Kingdom) Jill Mills	3	9
(United Kingdom) Lawrie Strong (United Kingdom) Pat Wheeler	6	6
Q	(Australia) Neville Holland (United Kingdom) Carole Rosser	4	2

Third round
3	(Czechoslovakia) J Javorský (Czechoslovakia) V Suková	6	6
(United States) R Holmberg (Italy) S Lazzarino	2	3
(Australia) N Gibson (Australia) J Gibson	2	6	6
(United Kingdom) L Strong (United Kingdom) P Wheeler	6	4	2

Fourth round
3	(Czechoslovakia) J Javorský (Czechoslovakia) V Suková	6	6
(Australia) N Gibson (Australia) J Gibson	3	3

==== Section 4 ====
First round
(United States) Donald Dell (Mexico) Yola Ramírez	4	6	4
(Federation of Rhodesia and Nyasaland) Adrian Bey (South Africa) Lynne Hutchings	6	3	6
(Chile) Ernesto Aguirre (United Kingdom) Ilse Davies	5	3
(Mexico) Esteban Reyes Jr. (France) Rosie Darmon	7	6
(United States) John Lesch (United States) Donna Floyd	9	8
(Australia) Barry Geraghty (United Kingdom) Jenny Young	7	6
(South Africa) Julie Mayer (South Africa) Margaret Hunt	6	6
(Italy) Sergio Tacchini (Italy) Francesca Gordigiani	2	2
(United States) Bill Bond (United States) Billie Jean Moffitt	7	6	3
(United Kingdom) Humphrey Truman (United Kingdom) Christine Truman	9	4	6
(United Kingdom) Howard Walton (United Kingdom) Liz Starkie	10	6
(United States) Frank Froehling (United States) Justina Bricka	12	8
(United States) Chris Crawford (France) Michelle Bourbonnais	1	3
(Austria) Ladislav Legenstein (Austria) Sonja Pachta	6	6
(India) Naresh Kumar (Australia) Nell Hopman
(Australia) Ken Fletcher (Australia) Robyn Ebbern	w/o

Second round
(Federation of Rhodesia and Nyasaland) A Bey (South Africa) L Hutchings	2	13	6
(Mexico) E Reyes (France) R Darmon	6	11	3
(United States) J Lesch (United States) D Floyd	2	2
(South Africa) J Mayer (South Africa) M Hunt	6	6
(United Kingdom) H Truman (United Kingdom) C Truman	3	11
(United States) F Froehling (United States) J Bricka	6	13
(Austria) L Legenstein (Austria) S Pachta	4	3
(India) N Kumar (Australia) E Hopman	6	6

Third round
(Federation of Rhodesia and Nyasaland) A Bey (South Africa) L Hutchings	6	8
(South Africa) J Mayer (South Africa) M Hunt	4	6
(United States) F Froehling (United States) J Bricka	7	13
(India) N Kumar (Australia) E Hopman	5	11

Fourth round
(Federation of Rhodesia and Nyasaland) A Bey (South Africa) L Hutchings	2	5
(United States) F Froehling (United States) J Bricka	6	7

=== Bottom half ===
==== Section 5 ====
First round
Q	(Australia) Geoff Pares (Canada) Susan Butt	6	4	7
Q	(New Zealand) Ian Crookenden (United Kingdom) Frances Walton	3	6	5
(United Kingdom) Andrew Yates-Bell (United Kingdom) Caroline Yates-Bell	0	13
(United Kingdom) Roger Taylor (United Kingdom) Robin Blakelock	6	15
(Sweden) Ingemar Ingvarsson (Sweden) Gudrun Rosin	5	4
(Australia) Will Coghlan (United Kingdom) Shirley Brasher	7	6
(Norway) Jarl Bibow (Norway) Tone Schirmer	6	0	2
(United Kingdom) John Barrett (United Kingdom) Billie Woodgate	3	6	6
(West Germany) Wolfram Schneiders (United Kingdom) Valerie Gardner	4	4
(Australia) Alan Lane (United States) Belmar Gunderson	6	6
(Austria) Franz Hainka (Austria) Doris Schuster	3	6	7
(United States) Budge Patty (Italy) Lea Pericoli	6	3	5
(South Africa) Bertie Gaertner (South Africa) Renée Schuurman	6	6
(Australia) Barry Phillips-Moore (Australia) Anne Phillips-Moore	2	1
Q	(United Kingdom) Jimmy Upton (United Kingdom) Ruth Illingworth
(Australia) John Newcombe (Australia) Mary Reitano	w/o

Second round
(Australia) G Pares (Canada) S Butt	0	5
(United Kingdom) R Taylor (United Kingdom) R Blakelock	6	7
(Australia) W Coghlan (United Kingdom) S Brasher	6	4	2
(United Kingdom) J Barrett (United Kingdom) R Woodgate	4	6	6
(Australia) A Lane (United States) B Gunderson	6	6
(Austria) F Hainka (Austria) D Schuster	1	2
(South Africa) A Gaertner (South Africa) R Schuurman	6	6
Q	(United Kingdom) J Upton (United Kingdom) R Illingworth	2	4

Third round
(United Kingdom) R Taylor (United Kingdom) R Blakelock	2	5
(United Kingdom) J Barrett (United Kingdom) R Woodgate	6	7
(Australia) A Lane (United States) B Gunderson	4	3
(South Africa) A Gaertner (South Africa) R Schuurman	6	6

Fourth round
(United Kingdom) J Barrett (United Kingdom) R Woodgate	6	7
(South Africa) A Gaertner (South Africa) R Schuurman	2	5

==== Section 6 ====
First round

Second round
(United Kingdom) Geoff Ward (United Kingdom) Rosemary Deloford	0	3
(Soviet Union) Sergei Likhachev (Soviet Union) Anna Dmitrieva	6	6
(Venezuela) Isaías Pimentel (Spain) Pilar Barril	4	1
(New Zealand) Lew Gerrard (United Kingdom) Lorna Cawthorn	6	6
(United States) Whitney Reed (United Kingdom) Ann Haydon	6	6
(South Africa) Keith Diepraam (South Africa) Marlene Gerson	1	3
(Colombia) William Álvarez (United States) Pat Stewart	1	4
4	(Australia) Bob Howe (West Germany) Edda Buding	6	6

Third round
(Soviet Union) S Likhachev (Soviet Union) A Dmitrieva	6	8
(New Zealand) L Gerrard (United Kingdom) L Cawthorn	2	6
(United States) W Reed (United Kingdom) A Haydon	4	11	4
4	(Australia) R Howe (West Germany) E Buding	6	9	6

Fourth round
(Soviet Union) S Likhachev (Soviet Union) A Dmitrieva	9	6	0
4	(Australia) R Howe (West Germany) E Buding	7	8	9

==== Section 7 ====
First round

Second round
(Australia) Tim Clayton (South Africa) Meryl Mark	1	6
(New Zealand) Mark Otway (United Kingdom) Pauline Roberts	6	8
(South Africa) Abe Segal (United Kingdom) Thelma Lister	4	9
(United Kingdom) Gerry Oakley (United Kingdom) Honor Clarke	6	11
(Socialist Federal Republic of Yugoslavia) Boro Jovanović (United States) Gloria Butler	4	6	13
(West Germany) Gunter Sanders (United Kingdom) Pat Hird	6	3	15
(Australia) Bob Mark (United States) Sally Moore	5	6	6
(France) Jean Borotra (France) Danièle Wild	7	2	4

Third round
(New Zealand) M Otway (United Kingdom) P Roberts	4	6	7
(United Kingdom) G Oakley (United Kingdom) H Clarke	6	3	9
(West Germany) G Sanders (United Kingdom) P Hird	4	2
(Australia) R Mark (United States) S Moore	6	6

Fourth round
(United Kingdom) G Oakley (United Kingdom) H Clarke	3	3
(Australia) R Mark (United States) S Moore	6	6

==== Section 8 ====
First round

Second round
(New Zealand) John McDonald (United Kingdom) Pat Hales	6	3	10
(Brazil) José Edison Mandarino (Spain) Carmen Coronado	4	6	12
(Australia) John Hillebrand (Denmark) Pia Balling	9	4
(United Kingdom) Mike Sangster (United Kingdom) Deidre Catt	11	6
(Federation of Rhodesia and Nyasaland) Don Black (United Kingdom) Diane Tuckey	6	6
(Republic of Ireland) James Buckley (Republic of Ireland) Mary O'Sullivan	2	3
(Australia) Bob Hewitt (Australia) Jan Lehane	4	5
2	(Argentina) Enrique Morea (Australia) Margaret Smith	6	7

Third round
(Brazil) JE Mandarino (Spain) C Coronado	6	6
(United Kingdom) M Sangster (United Kingdom) D Catt	4	4
(Federation of Rhodesia and Nyasaland) D Black (United Kingdom) D Tuckey	w/o
2	(Argentina) E Morea (Australia) M Smith

Fourth round
(Brazil) JE Mandarino (Spain) C Coronado	4	2
2	(Argentina) E Morea (Australia) M Smith	6	6
