= 1960 Wimbledon Championships – Women's doubles =

Women's doubles
- 1960 Wimbledon Championships

Final
- Champions: (Brazil) Maria Bueno (United States) Darlene Hard
- Runners-up: (South Africa) Sandra Reynolds (South Africa) Renée Schuurman
- Score: 6–4, 6–0

Details
- Draw: 48 (5 Q )
- Seeds: 4

Events
Singles	men	women		boys	girls
Doubles	men	women	mixed	boys	girls
← 1959 ·	Wimbledon Championships	· 1961 →

Jeanne Arth and Darlene Hard were the defending champions, but Arth did not compete. Hard partnered with Maria Bueno, and they defeated Sandra Reynolds and Renée Schuurman in the final, 6–4, 6–0 to win the ladies' doubles tennis title at the 1960 Wimbledon Championships.

== Seeds ==
1. (Brazil) Maria Bueno / (United States) Darlene Hard (champions)
2. (Australia) Margaret Hellyer / (Mexico) Yola Ramírez (quarterfinals)
3. (United States) Karen Hantze / (United States) Janet Hopps (semifinals)
4. (South Africa) Sandra Reynolds / (South Africa) Renée Schuurman (final)

Click on the seed number of a player to go to their draw section.

== Draw ==
=== Key ===
- Q = Qualifier
- WC = Wild card
- LL = Lucky loser
- Alt = Alternate
- SE = Special exempt
- PR = Protected ranking
- ITF = ITF entry
- JE = Junior exempt
- w/o = Walkover
- r = Retired
- d = Defaulted
- SR = Special ranking

=== Finals ===
Quarterfinals
2	(Australia) Margaret Hellyer (Mexico) Yola Ramírez	3	4
(Australia) Mary Hawton (Australia) Jan Lehane	6	6
4	(South Africa) Sandra Reynolds (South Africa) Renée Schuurman	6	6
(Italy) Silvana Lazzarino (Italy) Lea Pericoli	4	2
(United Kingdom) Sheila Armstrong (United Kingdom) Deidre Catt	6	3
3	(United States) Karen Hantze (United States) Janet Hopps	8	6
(West Germany) Edda Buding (Czechoslovakia) Věra Pužejová	2	3
1	(Brazil) Maria Bueno (United States) Darlene Hard	6	6

Semifinals
(Australia) Mary Hawton (Australia) Jan Lehane	5	1
4	(South Africa) Sandra Reynolds (South Africa) Renée Schuurman	7	6
3	(United States) Karen Hantze (United States) Janet Hopps	6	1	4
1	(Brazil) Maria Bueno (United States) Darlene Hard	3	6	6

Final
4	(South Africa) Sandra Reynolds (South Africa) Renée Schuurman	4	0
1	(Brazil) Maria Bueno (United States) Darlene Hard	6	6

=== Top half ===
==== Section 1 ====
First round

Second round
2	(Australia) Margaret Hellyer (Mexico) Yola Ramírez	6	6
(United Kingdom) Lorna Cawthorn (United Kingdom) Joan Hughesman	2	4
Q	(United Kingdom) Sheila Bramley (United Kingdom) Leonie Brighton	7	6
Q	(United Kingdom) Jane Rushton (United Kingdom) Judy Tee	5	3
Q	(United Kingdom) Louise Grundy (United Kingdom) JA Thomson	6	5	4
(Austria) Edda Herdy (Austria) Sonja Pachta	2	7	6
(Australia) Mary Hawton (Australia) Jan Lehane	6	8
(United Kingdom) Rita Bentley (United Kingdom) Pat Hales	0	6

Third round
2	(Australia) M Hellyer (Mexico) Y Ramírez	6	7
(United Kingdom) S Bramley (United Kingdom) L Brighton	4	5
(Austria) E Herdy (Austria) S Pachta	5	5
(Australia) M Hawton (Australia) J Lehane	7	7

Fourth round
2	(Australia) M Hellyer (Mexico) Y Ramírez	3	4
(Australia) M Hawton (Australia) J Lehane	6	6

==== Section 2 ====
First round
4	(South Africa) Sandra Reynolds (South Africa) Renée Schuurman	4	6	6
(France) Florence de la Courtie (France) Aline Nenot	6	2	2
(United Kingdom) Gill Evans (United Kingdom) Vera Thomas	6	8	6
(Sweden) Katarina Frendelius (Sweden) Gudrun Rosin	3	10	8
(United Kingdom) Ann Haydon (United Kingdom) Angela Mortimer	6	6
(South Africa) Marlene Gerson (South Africa) Meryl Hammill	3	1
(Chile) Maria Ayala (United States) Pat Stewart	3	6	6
Q	(United Kingdom) Jennifer Chamberlain (United Kingdom) Sheila Macintosh	6	4	4
Q	(United Kingdom) Valerie Gardner (United Kingdom) Margaret Grace	1	6	6
(United Kingdom) Janet Kemp (United Kingdom) Jenny Young	6	4	3
(Italy) Silvana Lazzarino (Italy) Lea Pericoli	6	6
(United Kingdom) Georgie Cox (United Kingdom) Billie Woodgate	4	3
(Soviet Union) Anna Dmitrieva (Soviet Union) Irina Ryazanova	5	6	6
(Republic of Ireland) Heather Flinn (Republic of Ireland) June Byrne	7	4	4
(United States) Dorothy Knode (United States) Gwyn Thomas	2	4
(United Kingdom) Elaine Shenton (United Kingdom) Liz Starkie	6	6

Second round
4	(South Africa) S Reynolds (South Africa) R Schuurman	6	6
(Sweden) K Frendelius (Sweden) G Rosin	3	1
(United Kingdom) A Haydon (United Kingdom) A Mortimer	6	6
(Chile) M Ayala (United States) P Stewart	0	0
(United Kingdom) V Gardner (United Kingdom) M Grace	3	4
(Italy) S Lazzarino (Italy) L Pericoli	6	6
(Soviet Union) A Dmitrieva (Soviet Union) I Ryazanova	4	1
(United Kingdom) E Shenton (United Kingdom) E Starkie	6	6

Third round
4	(South Africa) S Reynolds (South Africa) R Schuurman	6	6
(United Kingdom) A Haydon (United Kingdom) A Mortimer	3	3
(Italy) S Lazzarino (Italy) L Pericoli	6	6
(United Kingdom) E Shenton (United Kingdom) E Starkie	4	2

Fourth round
4	(South Africa) S Reynolds (South Africa) R Schuurman	6	6
(Italy) S Lazzarino (Italy) L Pericoli	4	2

=== Bottom half ===
==== Section 3 ====
First round
(West Germany) Margot Dittmeyer (West Germany) Renate Ostermann	0	9
(Federation of Rhodesia and Nyasaland) Mrs CJR Hayward (South Africa) Joan Scott	6	11
(United Kingdom) Thelma Lister (Norway) Tone Schirmer	6	1	3
(United Kingdom) Rosemary Deloford (United Kingdom) Jill Mills	3	6	6
(Switzerland) Ruth Kaufmann (Hungary) Márta Peterdy-Wolf	w/o
(United Kingdom) Shirley Brasher (United States) Sally Moore
(United Kingdom) Sheila Armstrong (United Kingdom) Deidre Catt	6	6
(United Kingdom) Caroline Leather (United Kingdom) Jenny Trewby	2	0
(United States) Laura Bryan (United States) Gloria Butler	4	3
(Australia) Jill Langley (Australia) Genevieve O'Brien	6	6
(Hungary) Zsuzsa Körmöczy (United Kingdom) Pearl Panton	6	1	0
(France) Susan Chatrier (United Kingdom) Anne Shilcock	3	6	6
(Spain) Pilar Barril (Spain) Ana María Estalella	3	6	3
(United Kingdom) Pauline Roberts (United Kingdom) Pat Wheeler	6	4	6
(South Africa) Margaret Hunt (South Africa) Lynne Hutchings	4	2
3	(United States) Karen Hantze (United States) Janet Hopps	6	6

Second round
(Federation of Rhodesia and Nyasaland) Mrs CJR Hayward (South Africa) J Scott	6	6
(United Kingdom) R Deloford (United Kingdom) J Mills	2	2
(United Kingdom) S Brasher (United States) S Moore	2	5
(United Kingdom) S Armstrong (United Kingdom) D Catt	6	7
(Australia) J Langley (Australia) G O'Brien	5	3
(France) S Chatrier (United Kingdom) A Shilcock	7	6
(United Kingdom) P Roberts (United Kingdom) P Wheeler	1	8	3
3	(United States) K Hantze (United States) J Hopps	6	6	6

Third round
(Federation of Rhodesia and Nyasaland) Mrs CJR Hayward (South Africa) J Scott	1	3
(United Kingdom) S Armstrong (United Kingdom) D Catt	6	6
(France) S Chatrier (United Kingdom) A Shilcock	3	5
3	(United States) K Hantze (United States) J Hopps	6	7

Fourth round
(United Kingdom) S Armstrong (United Kingdom) D Catt	6	3
3	(United States) K Hantze (United States) J Hopps	8	6

==== Section 4 ====
First round

Second round
(United Kingdom) Jean Knight (United Kingdom) Viola White	3	1
(Belgium) Christiane Mercelis (New Zealand) Ruia Morrison	6	6
(West Germany) Edda Buding (Czechoslovakia) Věra Pužejová	8	6	6
(South Africa) Heather Segal (South Africa) Bernice Vukovich	10	2	4
(Australia) Norma Marsh (Australia) Dawn Thomas	2	2
(United Kingdom) Pat Hird (United Kingdom) Caroline Yates-Bell	6	6
(United Kingdom) Hazel Cheadle (United Kingdom) Gem Hoahing	1	2
1	(Brazil) Maria Bueno (United States) Darlene Hard	6	6

Third round
(Belgium) C Mercelis (New Zealand) R Morrison	8	4
(West Germany) E Buding (Czechoslovakia) V Pužejová	10	6
(United Kingdom) P Hird (United Kingdom) C Yates-Bell	2	5
1	(Brazil) M Bueno (United States) D Hard	6	7

Fourth round
(West Germany) E Buding (Czechoslovakia) V Pužejová	2	3
1	(Brazil) M Bueno (United States) D Hard	6	6
