= 1961 Wimbledon Championships – Women's singles =

Women's singles
- 1961 Wimbledon Championships

Final
- Champion: (United Kingdom) Angela Mortimer
- Runner-up: (United Kingdom) Christine Truman
- Score: 4–6, 6–4, 7–5

Details
- Draw: 96 (10 Q )
- Seeds: 8

Events
Singles	men	women		boys	girls
Doubles	men	women	mixed	boys	girls
← 1960 ·	Wimbledon Championships	· 1962 →

Angela Mortimer defeated Christine Truman in the final, 4–6, 6–4, 7–5 to win the ladies' singles tennis title at the 1961 Wimbledon Championships. It was her third and last major singles title, and the final marked the last all-British final at the event to date.

Maria Bueno was the reigning champion, but did not defend her title due to jaundice.

== Seeds ==
1. (South Africa) Sandra Reynolds (semifinals)
2. (Australia) Margaret Smith (quarterfinals)
3. (United Kingdom) Ann Haydon (fourth round)
4. (Australia) Lesley Turner (second round)
5. (Mexico) Yola Ramírez (quarterfinals)
6. (United Kingdom) Christine Truman (final)
7. (United Kingdom) Angela Mortimer (champion)
8. (United States) Karen Hantze (quarterfinals)

Click on the seed number of a player to go to their draw section. As originally seeded, (United States) Darlene Hard was the fifth seed, but when she withdrew from the championships before the draw was made, the seeding list was redrafted and she was replaced by Yola Ramírez.

== Draw ==
=== Key ===
- Q = Qualifier
- WC = Wild card
- LL = Lucky loser
- Alt = Alternate
- ITF = ITF entry
- PR = Protected ranking
- SR = Special ranking
- SE = Special exempt
- JE = Junior exempt
- JR = Junior Accelerator Programme entrant
- CO = College Accelerator Programme entrant
- NG = Next Gen Accelerator Program entrant
- w/o = Walkover
- r = Retired
- d = Defaulted

=== Finals ===
Quarterfinals
2	(Australia) Margaret Smith	6	3	7
6	(United Kingdom) Christine Truman	3	6	9
(South Africa) Renée Schuurman	6	2	7
8	(United States) Karen Hantze	4	6	5
7	(United Kingdom) Angela Mortimer	6	6
(Czechoslovakia) Věra Suková	3	4
5	(Mexico) Yola Ramírez	6	3	0
1	(South Africa) Sandra Reynolds	4	6	6

Semifinals
6	(United Kingdom) Christine Truman	6	6
(South Africa) Renée Schuurman	4	4
7	(United Kingdom) Angela Mortimer	11	6
1	(South Africa) Sandra Reynolds	9	3

Final
6	(United Kingdom) Christine Truman	6	4	5
7	(United Kingdom) Angela Mortimer	4	6	7

=== Top half ===
==== Section 1 ====
First round

Second round
2	(Australia) Margaret Smith	3	6	6
(United States) Nancy Richey	6	3	4
(United States) Pat Stewart	3	6	6
(France) Susan Chatrier	6	0	3
(Spain) Carmen Coronado	6	1	6
(United States) Belmar Gunderson	0	6	4
(Hungary) Zsuzsa Körmöczy	6	6
(Italy) Silvana Lazzarino	2	2

Third round
2	(Australia) M Smith	6	6
(United States) P Stewart	3	0
(Spain) C Coronado	3	0
(Hungary) Z Körmöczy	6	6

Fourth round
2	(Australia) M Smith	6	6
(Hungary) Z Körmöczy	2	1

==== Section 2 ====
First round

Second round
6	(United Kingdom) Christine Truman	6	6
(Australia) Margaret Hellyer	4	4
(United Kingdom) Pat Hird	1	6	4
(Argentina) Nora Somoza	6	4	6
(Austria) Sonja Pachta	1	3
(South Africa) Margaret Hunt	6	6
(United Kingdom) Pat Hales	1	1
(West Germany) Edda Buding	6	6

Third round
6	(United Kingdom) C Truman	6	6
(Argentina) N Somoza	2	2
(South Africa) M Hunt	6	1	6
(West Germany) E Buding	2	6	4

Fourth round
6	(United Kingdom) C Truman	6	6
(South Africa) M Hunt	3	2

==== Section 3 ====
First round
3	(United Kingdom) Ann Haydon	6	6
Q	(Switzerland) Janine Bourgnon	0	0
(Belgium) Christiane Mercelis	7	7
(United States) Sally Moore	5	5
(France) Danièle Wild	4	4
(United Kingdom) Carol Webb	6	6
(Spain) Marta Pombo	6	3	10
Q	(United Kingdom) Janet Scoble	3	6	8
(United Kingdom) Frances MacLennan	3	3
(United Kingdom) Pat Wheeler	6	6
(South Africa) Renée Schuurman	7	6
(United Kingdom) Rita Bentley	5	3
Q	(Republic of Ireland) Eleanor O'Neill	2	2
(Italy) Francesca Gordigiani	6	6
(United Kingdom) Pauline Roberts	6	6
(United Kingdom) Frances Walton	0	4

Second round
3	(United Kingdom) A Haydon	6	6
(Belgium) C Mercelis	2	1
(United Kingdom) C Webb	6	6
(Spain) M Pombo	4	1
(United Kingdom) P Wheeler	2	0
(South Africa) R Schuurman	6	6
(Italy) F Gordigiani	6	3	6
(United Kingdom) P Roberts	2	6	4

Third round
3	(United Kingdom) A Haydon	6	6
(United Kingdom) C Webb	1	1
(South Africa) R Schuurman	0	6	6
(Italy) F Gordigiani	6	0	3

Fourth round
3	(United Kingdom) A Haydon	6	4	2
(South Africa) R Schuurman	3	6	6

==== Section 4 ====
First round
8	(United States) Karen Hantze	6	6
(France) Rosie Darmon	2	2
(United Kingdom) Vivienne Dennis	1	6	6
Q	(United Kingdom) Judy Tee	6	3	3
(United Kingdom) Robin Blakelock	6	7
(Hungary) Márta Peterdy-Wolf	3	5
(West Germany) Renate Ostermann	4	6	2
(Australia) Eva Duldig	6	4	6
(United Kingdom) Shirley Brasher	6	3	6
(Netherlands) Jenny Seven	0	6	2
(Australia) Jan Lehane	6	6
(Soviet Union) Anna Dmitrieva	4	0
(France) Michelle Bourbonnais	6	5	5
Q	(Canada) Eleanor Dodge	4	7	7
(United Kingdom) Jill Mills	6	6
(United Kingdom) Caroline Yates-Bell	3	4

Second round
8	(United States) K Hantze	6	6
(United Kingdom) V Dennis	1	1
(United Kingdom) R Blakelock	1	7
(Australia) E Duldig	6	9
(United Kingdom) S Brasher	0	3
(Australia) J Lehane	6	6
Q	(Canada) E Dodge	4	6	4
(United Kingdom) J Mills	6	1	6

Third round
8	(United States) K Hantze	6	6
(Australia) E Duldig	3	2
(Australia) J Lehane	6	6
(United Kingdom) J Mills	1	4

Fourth round
8	(United States) K Hantze	6	6
(Australia) J Lehane	3	2

=== Bottom half ===
==== Section 5 ====
First round
(United Kingdom) Rosemary Deloford	6	8
(Australia) Nell Hopman	3	6
Q	(Republic of Ireland) Geraldine Houlihan	1	3
(United Kingdom) Alison Stroud	6	6
(United States) Justina Bricka	6	6
(Sweden) Gudrun Rosin	4	3
(United States) Donna Floyd	6	6
(Soviet Union) Valeria Kuzmenko Titova	1	3
(United Kingdom) Margaret Lee	7	4	1
(United Kingdom) Ilse Davies	5	6	6
(United States) Carol Hanks	3	3
(Austria) Doris Schuster	6	6
Q	(United Kingdom) Honor Durose	1	12	7
Q	(United Kingdom) Jenny Wagstaff	6	10	5
(United Kingdom) Joyce Barclay	w/o
7	(United Kingdom) Angela Mortimer

Second round
(United Kingdom) R Deloford	6	6	6
(United Kingdom) A Stroud	8	1	2
(United States) J Bricka	6	9
(United States) D Floyd	1	7
(United Kingdom) I Davies	4	3
(Austria) D Schuster	6	6
Q	(United Kingdom) H Durose	0	0
7	(United Kingdom) A Mortimer	6	6

Third round
(United Kingdom) R Deloford	1	3
(United States) J Bricka	6	6
(Austria) D Schuster	2	0
7	(United Kingdom) A Mortimer	6	6

Fourth round
(United States) J Bricka	4	7
7	(United Kingdom) A Mortimer	6	9

==== Section 6 ====
First round
(United States) Gwyn Thomas	3	6	6
(South Africa) Meryl Mark	6	1	8
(South Africa) Lynne Hutchings	5	6	6
(Canada) Hanna Sladek	7	2	2
(Czechoslovakia) Věra Suková	6	6
(West Germany) Margot Dittmeyer	0	0
(South Africa) Marlene Gerson	7	7	1
(United Kingdom) Ruth Illingworth	9	5	6
(Spain) Pilar Barril	6	4	5
(West Germany) Karin Herich	3	6	7
(Norway) Tone Schirmer	6	6
(Australia) Joan Gibson	2	4
(United States) Mimi Arnold	7	6
(United Kingdom) Jenny Trewby	5	0
(United Kingdom) Diane Tuckey	1	2
4	(Australia) Lesley Turner	6	6

Second round
(South Africa) M Mark	2	3
(South Africa) L Hutchings	6	6
(Czechoslovakia) V Suková	6	6
(United Kingdom) R Illingworth	3	1
(West Germany) K Herich	7	6
(Norway) T Schirmer	5	2
(United States) M Arnold	7	6
4	(Australia) L Turner	5	4

Third round
(South Africa) L Hutchings	2	5
(Czechoslovakia) V Suková	6	7
(West Germany) K Herich	2	1
(United States) M Arnold	6	6

Fourth round
(Czechoslovakia) V Suková	7	6
(United States) M Arnold	5	2

==== Section 7 ====
First round

Second round
(Australia) Robyn Ebbern	2	6
(United Kingdom) Liz Starkie	6	8
Q	(United Kingdom) Viola White	6	2
(West Germany) Helga Schultze	8	6
(United Kingdom) Deidre Catt	6	6
(United Kingdom) Margaret O'Donnell	2	2
(United States) Billie Jean Moffitt	9	6	2
5	(Mexico) Yola Ramírez	11	1	6

Third round
(United Kingdom) E Starkie	6	6
(West Germany) H Schultze	0	1
(United Kingdom) D Catt	6	1	3
5	(Mexico) Y Ramírez	3	6	6

Fourth round
(United Kingdom) E Starkie	6	1
5	(Mexico) Y Ramírez	8	6

==== Section 8 ====
First round

Second round
(United Kingdom) Carole Rosser	3	6	0
(France) Florence de la Courtie	6	3	6
(Australia) Mary Reitano	w/o
(Spain) Ana María Estalella
(Italy) Lea Pericoli	4	3
Q	(Canada) Susan Butt	6	6
(United Kingdom) Lorna Cawthorn	1	0
1	(South Africa) Sandra Reynolds	6	6

Third round
(France) F de la Courtie	6	6
(Spain) AM Estalella	4	3
Q	(Canada) S Butt	3	2
1	(South Africa) S Reynolds	6	6

Fourth round
(France) F de la Courtie	1	3
1	(South Africa) S Reynolds	6	6

Preceded by 1961 French Championships – Women's singles	Grand Slam women's singles	Succeeded by 1961 U.S. National Championships – Women's singles
