= 1961 Wimbledon Championships – Women's doubles =

Women's doubles
- 1961 Wimbledon Championships

Final
- Champions: (United States) Karen Hantze (United States) Billie Jean Moffitt
- Runners-up: (Australia) Jan Lehane (Australia) Margaret Smith
- Score: 6–3, 6–4

Details
- Draw: 48 (5 Q )
- Seeds: 4

Events
Singles	men	women		boys	girls
Doubles	men	women	mixed	boys	girls
← 1960 ·	Wimbledon Championships	· 1962 →

Maria Bueno and Darlene Hard were the defending champions, but did not compete.

Karen Hantze and Billie Jean Moffitt defeated Jan Lehane and Margaret Smith in the final, 6–3, 6–4 to win the ladies' doubles tennis title at the 1961 Wimbledon Championships.

== Seeds ==
1. (South Africa) Sandra Reynolds / (South Africa) Renée Schuurman (quarterfinals)
2. (United Kingdom) Ann Haydon / (United Kingdom) Christine Truman (third round)
3. (Australia) Jan Lehane / (Australia) Margaret Smith (final)
4. (United States) Sally Moore / (Australia) Lesley Turner (semifinals)

Click on the seed number of a player to go to their draw section.

== Draw ==
=== Key ===
- Q = Qualifier
- WC = Wild card
- LL = Lucky loser
- Alt = Alternate
- SE = Special exempt
- PR = Protected ranking
- ITF = ITF entry
- JE = Junior exempt
- w/o = Walkover
- r = Retired
- d = Defaulted
- SR = Special ranking

=== Finals ===
Quarterfinals
(South Africa) Margaret Hunt (South Africa) Lynne Hutchings	4	6	7
(Soviet Union) Anna Dmitrieva (Soviet Union) Valeria Kuzmenko Titova	6	1	5
3	(Australia) Jan Lehane (Australia) Margaret Smith	6	12
(France) Rosie Darmon (Mexico) Yola Ramírez	0	10
(Australia) Eva Duldig (South Africa) Marlene Gerson	7	1
4	(United States) Sally Moore (Australia) Lesley Turner	9	6
(United States) Karen Hantze (United States) Billie Jean Moffitt	9	6
1	(South Africa) Sandra Reynolds (South Africa) Renée Schuurman	7	3

Semifinals
(South Africa) Margaret Hunt (South Africa) Lynne Hutchings	1	1
3	(Australia) Jan Lehane (Australia) Margaret Smith	6	6
4	(United States) Sally Moore (Australia) Lesley Turner	3	0
(United States) Karen Hantze (United States) Billie Jean Moffitt	6	6

Final
3	(Australia) Jan Lehane (Australia) Margaret Smith	3	4
(United States) Karen Hantze (United States) Billie Jean Moffitt	6	6

=== Top half ===
==== Section 1 ====
First round

Second round
2	(United Kingdom) Ann Haydon (United Kingdom) Christine Truman	6	6
(Spain) Pilar Barril (Spain) Carmen Coronado	1	1
(South Africa) Margaret Hunt (South Africa) Lynne Hutchings	6	6
Q	(United Kingdom) J Macintosh (United Kingdom) JA Watts	2	0
(France) Michelle Bourbonnais (France) Susan Chatrier	6	6
(United Kingdom) Gill Evans (United Kingdom) Billie Woodgate	4	3
(Soviet Union) Anna Dmitrieva (Soviet Union) Valeria Kuzmenko Titova	1	6	6
(United Kingdom) Gem Hoahing (France) Danièle Wild	6	3	2

Third round
2	(United Kingdom) A Haydon (United Kingdom) C Truman	5	6	3
(South Africa) M Hunt (South Africa) L Hutchings	7	3	6
(France) M Bourbonnais (France) S Chatrier	6	0
(Soviet Union) A Dmitrieva (Soviet Union) V Kuzmenko Titova	8	6

Fourth round
(South Africa) M Hunt (South Africa) L Hutchings	4	6	7
(Soviet Union) A Dmitrieva (Soviet Union) V Kuzmenko Titova	6	1	5

==== Section 2 ====
First round
3	(Australia) Jan Lehane (Australia) Margaret Smith	6	6
(United States) Justina Bricka (United States) Carol Hanks	1	1
(United Kingdom) Valerie Gardner (United Kingdom) Margaret Grace	2	1
(Australia) Margaret Hellyer (Czechoslovakia) Věra Suková	6	6
(United Kingdom) Jennifer Chamberlain (United Kingdom) Viola White	5	6	8
(Australia) Nell Hopman (South Africa) Meryl Mark	7	3	6
(Republic of Ireland) Eleanor O'Neill (Republic of Ireland) Mary O'Sullivan	2	7
(United States) Mimi Arnold (United Kingdom) Liz Starkie	6	9
(Hungary) Márta Peterdy-Wolf (Norway) Tone Schirmer	6	6
(Belgium) Monique Bedoret (Belgium) Poucette Bernheim	3	1
(France) Rosie Darmon (Mexico) Yola Ramírez	6	8
(West Germany) Edda Buding (West Germany) Helga Schultze	2	6
(United Kingdom) Rosemary Deloford (United Kingdom) Jill Mills	5	7	2
(France) Florence de la Courtie (Belgium) Christiane Mercelis	7	5	6
(Canada) Hanna Sladek (United States) Pat Stewart	3	5
(United Kingdom) Pat Hird (United Kingdom) Caroline Yates-Bell	6	7

Second round
3	(Australia) J Lehane (Australia) M Smith	6	6
(Australia) M Hellyer (Czechoslovakia) V Suková	4	1
(United Kingdom) J Chamberlain (United Kingdom) V White	6	2	3
(United States) M Arnold (United Kingdom) E Starkie	2	6	6
(Hungary) M Peterdy-Wolf (Norway) T Schirmer	2	1
(France) R Darmon (Mexico) Y Ramírez	6	6
(France) F de la Courtie (Belgium) C Mercelis	5	2
(United Kingdom) P Hird (United Kingdom) C Yates-Bell	7	6

Third round
3	(Australia) J Lehane (Australia) M Smith	6	3	6
(United States) M Arnold (United Kingdom) E Starkie	0	6	1
(France) R Darmon (Mexico) Y Ramírez	3	6	6
(United Kingdom) P Hird (United Kingdom) C Yates-Bell	6	1	1

Fourth round
3	(Australia) J Lehane (Australia) M Smith	6	12
(France) R Darmon (Mexico) Y Ramírez	0	10

=== Bottom half ===
==== Section 3 ====
First round
(Australia) Eva Duldig (South Africa) Marlene Gerson	6	6
Q	(United Kingdom) Sheila Bramley (United Kingdom) Leonie Brighton	4	3
(Spain) Ana María Estalella (Spain) Marta Pombo	6	6
(United Kingdom) Jane Rushton (United Kingdom) Judy Tee	2	2
Q	(United Kingdom) Valerie Clark (United Kingdom) Lesley Hustwit	3	4
(Italy) Silvana Lazzarino (Italy) Lea Pericoli	6	6
(United States) Donna Floyd (United States) Belmar Gunderson
(Australia) Robyn Ebbern (Australia) Mary Reitano	w/o
(United Kingdom) Joyce Barclay (United Kingdom) Frances MacLennan	w/o
(United Kingdom) Ilse Davies (West Germany) Karin Herich
(Hungary) Zsuzsa Körmöczy (United States) Nancy Richey	w/o
(United Kingdom) Rita Bentley (United Kingdom) Pauline Roberts
(United Kingdom) Lorna Cawthorn (United Kingdom) Pat Wheeler	4	6	9
(United Kingdom) Carole Rosser (United Kingdom) Jenny Trewby	6	2	7
(Australia) Joan Gibson (Sweden) Gudrun Rosin	3	4
4	(United States) Sally Moore (Australia) Lesley Turner	6	6

Second round
(Australia) E Duldig (South Africa) M Gerson	11	6
(Spain) AM Estalella (Spain) Marta Pombo	9	4
(Italy) S Lazzarino (Italy) L Pericoli	1	7	6
(United States) D Floyd (United States) B Gunderson	6	5	3
(United Kingdom) I Davies (West Germany) K Herich	4	2
(United Kingdom) R Bentley (United Kingdom) P Roberts	6	6
(United Kingdom) L Cawthorn (United Kingdom) P Wheeler	3	3
4	(United States) S Moore (Australia) L Turner	6	6

Third round
(Australia) E Duldig (South Africa) M Gerson	1	6	6
(Italy) S Lazzarino (Italy) L Pericoli	6	1	3
(United Kingdom) R Bentley (United Kingdom) P Roberts	6	6	5
4	(United States) S Moore (Australia) L Turner	8	3	7

Fourth round
(Australia) E Duldig (South Africa) M Gerson	7	1
4	(United States) S Moore (Australia) L Turner	9	6

==== Section 4 ====
First round

Second round
(United Kingdom) Pat Hales (United Kingdom) Vera Thomas	1	4
(West Germany) Margot Dittmeyer (West Germany) Renate Ostermann	6	6
Q	(United Kingdom) Cathy Lyon (United Kingdom) Julie Wilson	2	1
(United States) Karen Hantze (United States) Billie Jean Moffitt	6	6
(Austria) Sonja Pachta (Austria) Doris Schuster	6	1	6
Q	(Argentina) Mabel Bove (Argentina) Nora Somoza	3	6	3
(United Kingdom) Deidre Catt (United Kingdom) Angela Mortimer	1	3
1	(South Africa) Sandra Reynolds (South Africa) Renée Schuurman	6	6

Third round
(West Germany) M Dittmeyer (West Germany) R Ostermann	2	1
(United States) K Hantze (United States) BJ Moffitt	6	6
(Austria) S Pachta (Austria) D Schuster	3	5
(South Africa) S Reynolds (South Africa) R Schuurman	6	7

Fourth round
(United States) K Hantze (United States) BJ Moffitt	9	6
1	(South Africa) S Reynolds (South Africa) R Schuurman	7	3
