= 1960 Wimbledon Championships – Women's singles =

Women's singles
- 1960 Wimbledon Championships

Final
- Champion: (Brazil) Maria Bueno
- Runner-up: (South Africa) Sandra Reynolds
- Score: 8–6, 6–0

Details
- Draw: 96 (10Q)
- Seeds: 8

Events
| Singles | men | women | | boys | girls |
| Doubles | men | women | mixed | boys | girls |
- Wimbledon Championships

Maria Bueno successfully defended her title, defeating Sandra Reynolds in the final, 8–6, 6–0 to win the ladies' singles tennis title at the 1960 Wimbledon Championships.

== Seeds ==
1. (Brazil) Maria Bueno (champion)
2. (United States) Darlene Hard (quarterfinals)
3. (United Kingdom) Christine Truman (semifinals)
4. (United Kingdom) Ann Haydon (semifinals)
5. (United Kingdom) Angela Mortimer (quarterfinals)
6. (Hungary) Zsuzsa Körmöczy (second round)
7. (Australia) Jan Lehane (withdrew)
8. (South Africa) Sandra Reynolds (final)

Click on the seed number of a player to go to their draw section.

Jan Lehane withdrew due to injury. Her opponent in the first round received a walkover into the second round.

== Draw ==
Key

- Q = Qualifier
- WC = Wild card
- LL = Lucky loser
- Alt = Alternate
- ITF = ITF entry
- PR = Protected ranking
- SR = Special ranking
- SE = Special exempt
- JE = Junior exempt
- JR = Junior Accelerator Programme entrant
- CO = College Accelerator Programme entrant
- NG = Next Gen Accelerator Program entrant
- w/o = Walkover
- r = Retired
- d = Defaulted

=== Finals ===
Quarterfinals
1 | (Brazil) Maria Bueno | 6 | 6
5 | (United Kingdom) Angela Mortimer | 1 | 1
3 | (United Kingdom) Christine Truman | 4 | 6 | 6
(United States) Karen Hantze | 6 | 4 | 4
(South Africa) Renée Schuurman | 5 | 6 | 2
4 | (United Kingdom) Ann Haydon | 7 | 1 | 6
8 | (South Africa) Sandra Reynolds | 6 | 2 | 6
2 | (United States) Darlene Hard | 1 | 6 | 1

Semifinals
1 | (Brazil) Maria Bueno | 6 | 5 | 6
3 | (United Kingdom) Christine Truman | 0 | 7 | 1
4 | (United Kingdom) Ann Haydon | 3 | 6 | 4
8 | (South Africa) Sandra Reynolds | 6 | 2 | 6

Final
1 | (Brazil) Maria Bueno | 8 | 6
8 | (South Africa) Sandra Reynolds | 6 | 0

=== Top half ===
==== Section 1 ====
First round

Second round
1 | (Brazil) Maria Bueno | 6 | 6
(Belgium) Christiane Mercelis | 3 | 2
(Norway) Tone Schirmer | 7 | 4 | 6
(Sweden) Gudrun Rosin | 5 | 6 | 2
Q | (United Kingdom) Penny Burrell | 6 | 1 | 3
Q | (United Kingdom) Sheila Macintosh | 3 | 6 | 6
(United States) Mimi Arnold | 6 | 1 | 4
(Australia) Margaret Hellyer | 2 | 6 | 6

Third round
1 | (Brazil) M Bueno | 6 | 6
(Norway) T Schirmer | 2 | 1
Q | (United Kingdom) S Macintosh | 0 | 2
(Australia) M Hellyer | 6 | 6

Fourth round
1 | (Brazil) M Bueno | 6 | 6
(Australia) M Hellyer | 0 | 0

==== Section 2 ====
First round

Second round
5 | (United Kingdom) Angela Mortimer | 6 | 6
(United Kingdom) Jenny Trewby | 2 | 1
(United States) Sally Moore | 4 | 4
(South Africa) Bernice Vukovich | 6 | 6
(West Germany) Renate Ostermann | 6 | 6
(Austria) Edda Herdy | 2 | 3
(South Africa) Margaret Hunt | 3 | 5
(France) Danièle Wild | 6 | 7

Third round
5 | (United Kingdom) A Mortimer | 6 | 6
(South Africa) B Vukovich | 2 | 3
(West Germany) R Ostermann | 6 | 6
(France) D Wild | 3 | 2

Fourth round
5 | (United Kingdom) A Mortimer | 6 | 6
(West Germany) R Ostermann | 2 | 4

==== Section 3 ====
First round
3 | (United Kingdom) Christine Truman | 6 | 6
(United Kingdom) Pat Wheeler | 1 | 2
(Soviet Union) Irina Ryazanova | 2 | 6 | 1
(United Kingdom) Pat Hales | 6 | 3 | 6
(United States) Laura Bryan | 3 | 7 | 6
(United Kingdom) Pat Hird | 6 | 5 | 1
(United States) Dorothy Knode | 6 | 6
Q | (United Kingdom) Ruth Illingworth | 3 | 3
(Czechoslovakia) Věra Pužejová | 7 | 6
(United Kingdom) Joyce Fulton | 5 | 2
(United Kingdom) Caroline Leather | 0 | 1
(South Africa) Heather Segal | 6 | 6
(South Africa) Meryl Hammill | 6 | 6
Q | (Spain) Carmen Coronado | 2 | 1
LL | (United Kingdom) Thelma Lister | 3 | 1
(Italy) Lea Pericoli | 6 | 6

Second round
3 | (United Kingdom) C Truman | 8 | 6
(United Kingdom) P Hales | 6 | 3
(United States) L Bryan | 2 | 2
(United States) D Knode | 6 | 6
(Czechoslovakia) V Pužejová | 4 | 6 | 7
(South Africa) H Segal | 6 | 3 | 5
(South Africa) M Hammill | 4 | 4
(Italy) L Pericoli | 6 | 6

Third round
3 | (United Kingdom) C Truman | 1 | 6 | 6
(United States) D Knode | 6 | 0 | 3
(Czechoslovakia) V Pužejová | 6 | 6
(Italy) L Pericoli | 1 | 4

Fourth round
3 | (United Kingdom) C Truman | 7 | 6
(Czechoslovakia) V Pužejová | 5 | 3

==== Section 4 ====
First round
7 | (Australia) Jan Lehane | w/o
(United Kingdom) Liz Starkie
(United Kingdom) Jenny Young | 0 | 4
(New Zealand) Ruia Morrison | 6 | 6
Q | (United Kingdom) Louise Grundy | 1 | 11 | 2
(Switzerland) Ruth Kaufmann | 6 | 9 | 0^{r}
(United Kingdom) Jenny Wagstaff | 1 | 2
(South Africa) Lynne Hutchings | 6 | 6
(United Kingdom) Vera Thomas | 6 | 6
(United Kingdom) Bobbie Wilson | 0 | 3
(United States) Karen Hantze | 6 | 6
(Republic of Ireland) Heather Flinn | 0 | 3
(France) Aline Nenot | 4 | 6 | 6
(Australia) Dawn Thomas | 6 | 2 | 4
(United Kingdom) Caroline Yates-Bell | 6 | 6
(United Kingdom) Leonie Brighton | 1 | 2

Second round
(United Kingdom) E Starkie | 1 | 0
(New Zealand) R Morrison | 6 | 6
Q | (United Kingdom) L Grundy | 0 | 0
(South Africa) L Hutchings | 6 | 6
(United Kingdom) V Thomas | 1 | 2
(United States) K Hantze | 6 | 6
(France) A Nenot | 6 | 6
(United Kingdom) C Yates-Bell | 1 | 4

Third round
(New Zealand) R Morrison | 6 | 4 | 2
(South Africa) L Hutchings | 2 | 6 | 6
(United States) K Hantze | 6 | 6
(France) A Nenot | 2 | 1

Fourth round
(South Africa) L Hutchings | 2 | 8 | 1
(United States) K Hantze | 6 | 6 | 6

=== Bottom half ===
==== Section 5 ====
First round
(Austria) Sonja Pachta | 2 | 8 | 6
(United Kingdom) Jill Mills | 6 | 6 | 4
(Mexico) Yola Ramírez | 6 | 6
Q | (United Kingdom) Janet Kemp | 4 | 4
(United Kingdom) Pearl Panton | 2 | 2
(South Africa) Renée Schuurman | 6 | 6
(Australia) Mary Hawton | 6 | 6
(Australia) Genevieve O'Brien | 0 | 1
(United Kingdom) Pauline Roberts | 2 | 5
(France) Florence de la Courtie | 6 | 7
(South Africa) Marlene Gerson | 6 | 6 | 6
(France) Susan Chatrier | 8 | 3 | 0
Q | (United Kingdom) Sheila Bramley | 2 | 0
(United States) Janet Hopps | 6 | 6
(United Kingdom) Deidre Catt | 4 | 3
6 | (Hungary) Zsuzsa Körmöczy | 6 | 6

Second round
(Austria) S Pachta | 1 | 0
(Mexico) Y Ramírez | 6 | 6
(South Africa) R Schuurman | 6 | 4 | 6
(Australia) M Hawton | 2 | 6 | 1
(France) F de la Courtie | 6 | 2 | 6
(South Africa) M Gerson | 2 | 6 | 3
(United States) J Hopps | 6 | 3 | 9
6 | (Hungary) Z Körmöczy | 3 | 6 | 7

Third round
(Mexico) Y Ramírez | 2 | 2
(South Africa) R Schuurman | 6 | 6
(France) F de la Courtie | 4 | 1
(United States) J Hopps | 6 | 6

Fourth round
(South Africa) R Schuurman | 6 | 6
(United States) J Hopps | 3 | 4

==== Section 6 ====
First round
(United Kingdom) Rosemary Deloford | 8 | 6
(Hungary) Márta Peterdy-Wolf | 6 | 3
(United Kingdom) Sheila Armstrong | 6 | 6
(Australia) Jill Langley | 3 | 0
(United Kingdom) Rita Bentley | 6 | 6
(United Kingdom) Sue Waters | 2 | 2
(United States) Gwyn Thomas | 3 | 6 | 6
(Chile) Maria Ayala | 6 | 1 | 2
Q | (United Kingdom) Anthea Warwick | 1 | 6 | 1
Q | (United Kingdom) Jean Knight | 6 | 4 | 6
(United Kingdom) Carol Webb | 3 | 2
(United Kingdom) Elaine Shenton | 6 | 6
(United Kingdom) Hazel Cheadle | 6 | 6
(United Kingdom) Honor Durose | 2 | 1
(United Kingdom) Lorna Cawthorn | 1 | 1
4 | (United Kingdom) Ann Haydon | 6 | 6

Second round
(United Kingdom) R Deloford | 2 | 1
(United Kingdom) S Armstrong | 6 | 6
(United Kingdom) R Bentley | 6 | 7
(United States) G Thomas | 2 | 5
Q | (United Kingdom) J Knight | 6 | 1 | 3
(United Kingdom) E Shenton | 4 | 6 | 6
(United Kingdom) H Cheadle | 0 | 2
4 | (United Kingdom) A Haydon | 6 | 6

Third round
(United Kingdom) S Armstrong | 6 | 3 | 3
(United Kingdom) R Bentley | 4 | 6 | 6
(United Kingdom) E Shenton | 2 | 0
4 | (United Kingdom) A Haydon | 6 | 6

Fourth round
(United Kingdom) R Bentley | 6 | 0
4 | (United Kingdom) A Haydon | 8 | 6

==== Section 7 ====
First round

Second round
(West Germany) Margot Dittmeyer | 6 | 2 | 6
(Spain) Pilar Barril | 3 | 6 | 2
(United Kingdom) Alison Cox | 1 | 2
(West Germany) Edda Buding | 6 | 6
(United Kingdom) Shirley Brasher | 6 | 6
(Australia) Norma Marsh | 4 | 3
(France) Michelle Bourbonnais | 5 | 3
8 | (South Africa) Sandra Reynolds | 7 | 6

Third round
(West Germany) M Dittmeyer | 6 | 6
(West Germany) E Buding | 4 | 4
(United Kingdom) S Brasher | 1 | 2
8 | (South Africa) S Reynolds | 6 | 6

Fourth round
(West Germany) M Dittmeyer | 3 | 3
8 | (South Africa) S Reynolds | 6 | 6

==== Section 8 ====
First round

Second round
(Italy) Silvana Lazzarino | 6 | 6
(Kenya) Fran Marshall | 2 | 4
(Sweden) Katarina Frendelius | 2 | 0
(Soviet Union) Anna Dmitrieva | 6 | 6
(United Kingdom) Robin Blakelock | 3 | 7 | 2
Q | (United Kingdom) Frances Walton | 6 | 5 | 6
(United Kingdom) Anne Shilcock | 1 | 4
2 | (United States) Darlene Hard | 6 | 6

Third round
(Italy) S Lazzarino | 4 | 1
(Soviet Union) A Dmitrieva | 6 | 6
Q | (United Kingdom) F Walton | 1 | 0
2 | (United States) D Hard | 6 | 6

Fourth round
(Soviet Union) A Dmitrieva | 7 | 2 | 1
2 | (United States) D Hard | 5 | 6 | 6

| Preceded by 1960 French Championships – Women's singles | Grand Slam women's singles | Succeeded by 1960 U.S. National Championships – Women's singles |
