= 1961 in tennis =

This page covers all the important events in the sport of tennis in 1961. It provides the results of notable tournaments throughout the year on both the men's and women's ILTF tennis circuits.

== Australian Open ==
Category	Champion(s)	Finalist(s)	Score
Men's singles	(Australia) Roy Emerson	(Australia) Rod Laver	1–6, 6–3, 7–5, 6–4
Women's singles	(Australia) Margaret Smith	(Australia) Jan Lehane	6–1, 6–4
Men's doubles	(Australia) Rod Laver (Australia) Bob Mark	(Australia) Roy Emerson (Australia) Marty Mulligan	6–3, 7–5, 3–6, 9–11, 6–2
Women's doubles	(Australia) Mary Carter Reitano (Australia) Margaret Smith	(Australia) Mary Bevis Hawton (Australia) Jan Lehane	6–4, 3–6, 7–5
Mixed doubles	(Australia) Jan Lehane (Australia) Bob Hewitt	(Australia) Mary Carter Reitano (Australia) John Pearce	9–7, 6–2

== French Open ==
Category	Champion(s)	Finalist(s)	Score
Men's singles	(Spain) Manuel Santana	(Italy) Nicola Pietrangeli	4–6, 6–1, 3–6, 6–0, 6–2
Women's singles	(United Kingdom) Ann Haydon	(Mexico) Yola Ramírez	6–2, 6–1
Men's doubles	(Australia) Roy Emerson (Australia) Rod Laver	(Australia) Bob Howe (Australia) Bob Mark	3–6, 6–1, 6–1, 6–4
Women's doubles	(South Africa) Sandra Reynolds (South Africa) Renee Schuurman	(Brazil) Maria Bueno (United States) Darlene Hard	walkover
Mixed doubles	(United States) Darlene Hard (Australia) Rod Laver	(Czechoslovakia) Vera Suková (Czechoslovakia) Jirí Javorský	6–0, 2–6, 6–3

== Wimbledon ==
Category	Champion(s)	Finalist(s)	Score
Men's singles	(Australia) Rod Laver	(United States) Chuck McKinley	6–3, 6–1, 6–4
Women's singles	(United Kingdom) Angela Mortimer	(United Kingdom) Christine Truman	4–6, 6–4, 7–5
Men's doubles	(Australia) Roy Emerson (Australia) Neale Fraser	(Australia) Bob Hewitt (Australia) Fred Stolle	6–4, 6–8, 6–4, 6–8, 8–6
Women's doubles	(United States) Karen Hantze (United States) Billie Jean Moffitt	(Australia) Jan Lehane (Australia) Margaret Smith	6–3, 6–4
Mixed doubles	(Australia) Fred Stolle (Australia) Lesley Turner	(Australia) Robert Howe (West Germany) Edda Buding	11–9, 6–2

== US Open ==
Category	Champion(s)	Finalist(s)	Score
Men's singles	(Australia) Roy Emerson	(Australia) Rod Laver	7–5, 6–3, 6–2
Women's singles	(United States) Darlene Hard	(United Kingdom) Ann Haydon	6–3, 6–4
Men's doubles	(United States) Chuck McKinley (United States) Dennis Ralston	(Mexico) Rafael Osuna (Mexico) Antonio Palafox	6–3, 6–4, 2–6, 13–11
Women's doubles	(United States) Darlene Hard (Australia) Lesley Turner	(West Germany) Edda Buding (Mexico) Yola Ramírez	6–4, 5–7, 6–0
Mixed doubles	(Australia) Margaret Smith (Australia) Bob Mark	(United States) Darlene Hard (United States) Dennis Ralston	default (Note: Ralston was suspended by the USLTA for 'bad conduct' during an earlier Davis Cup American Zone final match against Mexico. As a result of the suspension the mixed doubles title was defaulted to Margaret Smith and Bob Mark.)
