= 1961 French Championships – Women's singles =

Women's singles
- 1961 French Championships

Final
- Champion: (United Kingdom) Ann Haydon
- Runner-up: (Mexico) Yola Ramírez
- Score: 6–2, 6–1

Details
- Seeds: 16

Events
Singles	men	women
Doubles	men	women
← 1960 ·	French Championships	· 1962 →

Sixth-seeded Ann Haydon defeated Yola Ramírez 6–2, 6–1 in the final to win the women's singles tennis title at the 1961 French Championships.

== Seeds ==
The seeded players are listed below. Ann Haydon is the champion; others show the round in which they were eliminated.

1. (United States) Darlene Hard (fourth round)
2. (Brazil) Maria Bueno (quarterfinals)
3. (Australia) Margaret Smith (quarterfinals)
4. (United Kingdom) Christine Truman (quarterfinals)
5. (Mexico) Yola Ramírez (finalist)
6. (United Kingdom) Ann Haydon (champion)
7. (South Africa) Sandra Reynolds (fourth round)
8. (France) Florence De La Courtie (third round)
9. (Australia) Jan Lehane (fourth round)
10. (Hungary) Zsuzsi Körmöczy (semifinals)
11. (South Africa) Renée Schuurman (fourth round)
12. (Australia) Mary Reitano (fourth round)
13. (Czechoslovakia) Vera Suková (fourth round)
14. (United Kingdom) Deidre Catt (third round)
15. (Australia) Lesley Turner (fourth round)
16. (West Germany) Edda Buding (semifinals)

== Draw ==
=== Key ===
- Q = Qualifier
- WC = Wild card
- LL = Lucky loser
- r = Retired

=== Finals ===
Quarterfinals
16	(West Germany) Edda Buding	3	6	6
(Spain) Pilar Barril	6	4	2
4	(United Kingdom) Christine Truman	8	5
5	(Mexico) Yola Ramírez	10	7
6	(United Kingdom) Ann Haydon	7	12
3	(Australia) Margaret Smith	5	10
10	(Hungary) Zsuzsi Körmöczy	6	6
2	(Brazil) Maria Bueno	3	3

Semifinals
16	(West Germany) Edda Buding	4	6	3
5	(Mexico) Yola Ramírez	6	4	6
6	(United Kingdom) Ann Haydon	3	6	6
10	(Hungary) Zsuzsi Körmöczy	6	1	3

Finals
5	(Mexico) Yola Ramírez	2	1
6	(United Kingdom) Ann Haydon	6	6

=== Earlier rounds ===
==== Section 1 ====
First round

Second round
1	(United States) Hard
(France) Siarry
(United States) Stewart
(France) Coste
16	(West Germany) Buding	2	6	6
(France) Huve	6	1	1
(France) Seghers	4	5
(Australia) Ebbern	6	7

Third round
1	(United States) Hard	6	6
(France) Coste	3	2
16	(West Germany) Buding	6	6
(Australia) Ebbern	4	4

Fourth round
1	(United States) Hard	2	3
16	(West Germany) Buding	6	6

==== Section 2 ====
First round

Second round
8	(France) De La Courtie	6	6
(France) Nay	0	4
(Spain) Barril	6	1	8
(France) Courteix	3	6	6
9	(Australia) Lehane	6	6
(France) Le Besnerais	4	0
(France) Langanay	6	5	3
(Italy) Beltrame	4	7	6

Third round
8	(France) De La Courtie	1	3
(Spain) Barril	6	6
9	(Australia) Lehane	6	6
(Italy) Beltrame	0	0

Fourth round
(Spain) Barril	6	2	6
9	(Australia) Lehane	0	6	3

==== Section 3 ====
First round

Second round
4	(United Kingdom) Truman	6	6
(France) Bourbonnais	2	4
(France) Rees-Lewis	6	2	5
(West Germany) Schultze	2	6	7
13	(Czechoslovakia) Suková	6	6
(Argentina) Bove	3	1
(Canada) Sladek
(France) Darmon

Third round
4	(United Kingdom) Truman	8	6
(West Germany) Schultze	6	2
13	(Czechoslovakia) Suková	7	6
(France) Darmon	5	3

Fourth round
4	(United Kingdom) Truman	2	6	6
13	(Czechoslovakia) Suková	6	3	1

==== Section 4 ====
First round
(Australia) Gibson	6	6
(France) Berson	3	2
(United States) Davidson	6	0	2
(France) Lieffrig	4	6	6
(France) Dürr
(United States) Moore	w/o
12	(Australia) Reitano	6	6
(France) Dusapt	4	2
(United Kingdom) Starkie	6	4	6
(France) Kermina	4	6	1
(France) Seghers	4	1
(South Africa) Gerson	6	6
(Argentina) Somoza
(Italy) Pericoli	w/o

Second round
5	(Mexico) Ramírez	6	6
(Australia) Gibson	3	2
(France) Lieffrig	0	8	2
(France) Dürr	6	6	6
12	(Australia) Reitano	6	4	6
(United Kingdom) Starkie	4	6	1
(South Africa) Gerson	6	3	2
(Argentina) Somoza	2	6	6

Third round
5	(Mexico) Ramírez	7	6
(France) Dürr	5	3
12	(Australia) Reitano	8	0	6
(Argentina) Somoza	6	6	2

Fourth round
5	(Mexico) Ramírez	6	6
12	(Australia) Reitano	0	2

==== Section 5 ====
First round
(France) Galtier
(Denmark) Balling	w/o
(Austria) Leyrer	4	6	11
(South Africa) Mark	6	2	13
(France) Salfati	4	7	1
(Australia) Hopman	6	5	0^{r}
(United States) Lampe	3	0
11	(South Africa) Schuurman	6	6
(United States) Arnold	6	6
(France) De Lansalut	2	4
(Italy) Lazzarino	6	6
(Spain) Estalella	3	2
(Australia) Hellyer	7	6
(France) Salvet	5	1

Second round
(France) Galtier	6	6
(South Africa) Mark	2	4
(France) Salfati	4	5
11	(South Africa) Schuurman	6	7
(United States) Arnold	4	0
(Italy) Lazzarino	6	6
(Australia) Hellyer	3	2
6	(United Kingdom) Haydon	6	6

Third round
(France) Galtier	3	6	2
11	(South Africa) Schuurman	6	3	6
(Italy) Lazzarino	1	4
6	(United Kingdom) Haydon	6	6

Fourth round
11	(South Africa) Schuurman	2	3
6	(United Kingdom) Haydon	6	6

==== Section 6 ====
First round

Second round
(Hungary) Bardóczy	3	1
(Belgium) Mercelis	6	6
(Australia) Duldig	1	2
14	(United Kingdom) Catt	6	6
(Italy) Bassi	1	6	2
(South Africa) Hutchings	6	4	6
(Canada) Dodge	1	2
3	(Australia) Smith	6	6

Third round
(Belgium) Mercelis	7	6
14	(United Kingdom) Catt	5	2
(South Africa) Hutchings	5	3
3	(Australia) Smith	7	6

Fourth round
(Belgium) Mercelis	4	1
3	(Australia) Smith	6	6

==== Section 7 ====
First round

Second round
(United States) Gunderson	4	r
(France) Galtier	6
(Italy) Gordigiani	3	2
10	(Hungary) Körmöczy	6	6
(Canada) Butt
(Italy) Riedl
(France) Wild	3	1
7	(South Africa) Reynolds	6	6

Third round
(France) Galtier	1	1
10	(Hungary) Körmöczy	6	6
(Canada) Butt	1	2
7	(South Africa) Reynolds	6	6

Fourth round
10	(Hungary) Körmöczy	7	3	7
7	(South Africa) Reynolds	5	6	5

==== Section 8 ====
First round

Second round
(France) Billaz	6	6
(South Africa) Lang	1	1
(Egypt) Abbas	2	4
15	(Australia) Turner	6	6
(Spain) Coronado	2	4
Peterdy-Wolf	6	6
(South Africa) Hunt	4	8	3
2	(Brazil) Bueno	6	6	6

Third round
(France) Billaz	4	6	4
15	(Australia) Turner	6	4	6
Peterdy-Wolf	1	0
2	(Brazil) Bueno	6	6

Fourth round
15	(Australia) Turner	2	7
2	(Brazil) Bueno	6	9

Preceded by 1961 Australian Championships – Women's singles	Grand Slam women's singles	Succeeded by 1961 Wimbledon Championships – Women's singles
