= Bernice Carr Vukovich =

South African tennis player (born 1938)

- Country (sports): South Africa
- Born: 12 January 1938 (age 88)
- Turned pro: 1954
- Retired: 1969

Singles
- Career titles: 17 ITF

Grand Slam singles results
- Australian Open: 1R (1965)
- French Open: 3R (1958)
- Wimbledon: 4R (1958)
- US Open: QF (1960)

Doubles
- Career titles: 5 ITF

Grand Slam doubles results
- Australian Open: 2R (1965)
- French Open: QF (1958)
- Wimbledon: 3R (1962)

Grand Slam mixed doubles results
- French Open: 2R (1960)
- Wimbledon: 4R (1960)

Bernice Carr Vukovich (née Car) (born 12 January 1938) is a retired South African tennis player from South Africa of Croatian origin. Her father was a Croat immigrant from the peninsula of Pelješac.

Bernice completed her secondary education at End Street Convent (Holy Family order), matriculating in 1955. She was South African junior tennis champion in 1954 and 1955. After she began to compete in senior tennis, she won 1958 and 1960 South African championship, while in 1959 she was runner-up. In 1958, she beat Heather Brewer-Segal with 3–6, 7–5, 6–4. In 1959, she lost the title in a match against Sandra Reynolds, losing 6–0, 8–6. In 1960, she regained the title, beating Sandra Reynolds with 6–1, 2–6, 12–10.

In 1965 Bernice Vukovich beat Luisa Bassi (Italy) 7–5,6–0 to win the International lawn tennis tournament in Palermo, Sicily.

She played many international matches. She competed in 1965 Federation Cup quarterfinals, playing for South Africa against Great Britain. She lost both matches. In singles, she lost to Christine Janes, and in doubles, she played with Annette Du Plooy and lost against Ann Haydon Jones and Deidre Keller.

In the 1960 US Open, she defeated Billie Jean King in the third round. Carr Vukovich was seeded seventh in this tournament.

== Career finals ==
Legend
$10,000 tournaments

=== Singles (17–8) ===
Result	No.	Date	Tournament	Surface	Opponent	Score
Loss	1.	19 May 1956	Paddington, United Kingdom	Hard	(South Africa) Sandra Reynolds	6–3, 0–6, 4–6
Win	2.	17 November 1956	Benoni, South Africa	Hard	(South Africa) Estelle van Tonder	6–2, 6–3
Loss	3.	1 December 1956	East London, South Africa	Hard	(South Africa) Beryl Bartlett	8–10, 6–1, 1–6
Loss	4.	1 January 1957	Port Elizabeth, South Africa	Hard	(South Africa) Heather Brewer-Segal	2–6, 2–6
Loss	5.	12 January 1957	Cape Town, South Africa	Hard	(Australia) Daphne Seeney	3–6, 5–7
Win	6.	7 October 1957	Johannesburg, South Africa	Hard	(South Africa) Jean Forbes	3–6, 6–3, 6–2
Loss	7.	12 January 1958	East London, South Africa	Hard	(South Africa) Gwendy Love	4–6, 6–4, 4–6
Win	8.	4 April 1958	Johannesburg, South Africa	Hard	(South Africa) Heather Brewer-Segal	3–6, 7–5, 6–4
Win	9.	21 June 1958	London, United Kingdom	Grass	(United States) Margaret Varner Bloss	6–4, 5–7, 8–6
Win	10.	20 September 1958	Johannesburg, South Africa	Hard	(South Africa) Estelle van Tonder	6–3, 6–1
Win	11.	3 January 1959	East London, South Africa	Hard	(South Africa) Dora Kilian	2–6, 6–3, 6–4
Win	12.	1 March 1959	Bloemfontein, South Africa	Clay	(South Africa) Estelle van Tonder	6–1, 6–2
Loss	13.	29 March 1959	Johannesburg, South Africa	Clay	(South Africa) Sandra Reynolds	0–6, 6–8
Win	14.	26 July 1959	Pietermaritzburg, South Africa	Hard	(South Africa) Dora Kilian	6–3 6–8 6–1
Win	15.	19 September 1959	Johannesburg, South Africa	Hard	(South Africa) Joan Cross	6–3, 6–1
Win	16.	2 January 1960	East London, South Africa	Hard	(South Africa) Valerie Forbes	6–3 6–3
Loss	17.	9 January 1960	Cape Town, South Africa	Hard	(South Africa) Sandra Reynolds	4–6, 4–6
Win	18.	18 April 1960	Johannesburg, South Africa	Hard	(South Africa) Sandra Reynolds	6–1 2–6 12–10
Win	19.	1 May 1960	Palermo, Italy	Clay	(Australia) Jan Lehane	6–4, 6–3
Win	20.	3 July 1960	Berlin, West Germany	Clay	(West Germany) Edda Buding	12–10, 6–4
Loss	21.	16 July 1960	Newport, Wales, United Kingdom	Grass	(United Kingdom) Angela Mortimer	9–11, 3–6
Win	22.	31 July 1960	Hilversum, Netherlands	Clay	(South Africa) Renée Schuurman	6–0, 6–1
Win	23.	26 December 1960	East London, South Africa	Hard	(South Africa) Valerie Forbes	6–3, 6–3
Win	24.	5 September 1964	Johannesburg, South Africa	Hard	(South Africa) Heather Brewer-Segal	7–5, 9–7
Win	25.	19 April 1965	Johannesburg, South Africa	Hard	(South Africa) Jean Forbes	6–4, 7–5

=== Doubles (5–15) ===
Outcome	No.	Date	Tournament	Surface	Partner	Opponents	Score
Loss	1.	7 January 1955	Port Elizabeth, South Africa	Hard	(South Africa) Lucille van der Westhuizen	(South Africa) Dora Kilian (South Africa) Leonie Vermaak	1–6, 1–6
Win	2.	14 July 1956	Sunderland, United Kingdom	Grass	(South Africa) Merrill Hammill	(United Kingdom) Rosemary Bulleid (United Kingdom) Georgie Woodgate	W/O
Loss	3.	17 November 1956	Benoni, South Africa	Hard	(South Africa) Merrill Hammill	(South Africa) Lynette Hutchings (Netherlands) Yvonne van der Linde	2–6, 6–3, 2–6
Loss	4.	12 January 1957	Cape Town, South Africa	Hard	(South Africa) Merrill Hammill	(Australia) Daphne Seeney (South Africa) Valerie Forbes	8–10, 0–6
Loss	5.	7 October 1957	Johannesburg, South Africa	Hard	(South Africa) Estelle Van Tonder	(South Africa) Beryl Bartlett (South Africa) Joan Scott	2–6, 0–6
Loss	6.	14 June 1958	Beckenham, United Kingdom	Grass	(South Africa) Jean Forbes	(New Zealand) Sonia Cox (New Zealand) Ruia Morrison	1–6, 3–6
Loss	7.	20 September 1958	Johannesburg, South Africa	Hard	(South Africa) Estelle van Tonder	(South Africa) Beryl Bartlett (South Africa) Joan Scott	2–6, 3–6
Loss	8.	3 January 1959	East London, South Africa	Hard	(South Africa) Estelle van Tonder	(South Africa) Beryl Bartlett (South Africa) Dora Kilian	0–6, 0–6
Loss	9.	2 January 1960	East London, South Africa	Hard	(South Africa) Peggy Pentelow	(South Africa) Jean Forbes (South Africa) Valerie Forbes	3–6 4–6
Loss	10.	9 January 1960	Cape Town, South Africa	Hard	(South Africa) Heather Brewer-Segal	(South Africa) Sandra Reynolds (South Africa) Renee Schuurman	5–7, 1–6
Loss	11.	18 April 1960	Johannesburg, South Africa	Hard	(South Africa) Heather Brewer-Segal	(South Africa) Sandra Reynolds (South Africa) Renee Schuurman	11–13, 9–7, 1–6
Win	12.	4 June 1960	Birmingham, United Kingdom	Grass	(Brazil) Maria Bueno	(United Kingdom) Ann Jones (United Kingdom) Angela Mortimer	6–3, 7–5
Loss	13.	11 June 1960	Bristol, United Kingdom	Grass	(United States) Gwyn Thomas	(South Africa) Sandra Reynolds (South Africa) Renee Schuurman	5–7, 3–6
Win	14.	16 July 1960	Newport, Wales, United Kingdom	Grass	(United Kingdom) Angela Mortimer	(United Kingdom) Rita Bentley (United Kingdom) Jill Rook Mills	6–1, 6–1
Loss	15.	31 July 1960	Hilversum, Netherlands	Clay	(South Africa) Renée Schuurman	(South Africa) Margaret Hunt (South Africa) Lynette Hutchings	6–4, 4–6, 5–7
Loss	16.	16 September 1961	Johannesburg, South Africa	Hard	(South Africa) Valerie Forbes	(South Africa) Annette Van Zyl (South Africa) Joan Cross	3–6, 3–6
Loss	17.	29 September 1962	Johannesburg, South Africa	Hard	(South Africa) Estelle van Tonder	(South Africa) Beryl Bartlett (South Africa) Jean Forbes	1–6, 7–5, 4–6
Loss	18.	15 April 1963	Johannesburg, South Africa	Hard	(South Africa) Marlene Gerson	(South Africa) Margaret Hunt (South Africa) Annette Van Zyl	2–6, 7–9
Win	19.	6 February 1965	Pretoria, South Africa	Hard	(United Kingdom) Christine Truman	(South Africa) Sandra Reynolds (South Africa) Heather Brewer-Segal	2–6, 6–1, 6–4
Win	20.	19 April 1965	Johannesburg, South Africa	Hard	(South Africa) Marlene Gerson	(South Africa) Jean Forbes (South Africa) Valerie Forbes	7–5, 7–5
