= 1965 Australian Championships – Women's singles =

Women's singles
- 1965 Australian Championships

Final
- Champion: (Australia) Margaret Smith
- Runner-up: (Brazil) Maria Bueno
- Score: 5–7, 6–4, 5–2 ret.

Details
- Draw: 52
- Seeds: 16

Events
Singles	men	women
Doubles	men	women
- Australian Championships

First-seeded Margaret Smith was the five-time defending champion, and successfully defended her title, defeating Maria Bueno 5–7, 6–4, 5–2 ret. in the final to win the women's singles tennis title at the 1965 Australian Championships.

== Seeds ==
The seeded players are listed below. Margaret Smith is the champion; others show the round in which they were eliminated.

1. (Australia) Margaret Smith (champion)
2. (Brazil) Maria Bueno (finalist)
3. (Australia) Lesley Turner (third round)
4. (United States) Billie Jean Moffitt (semifinals)
5. (Australia) Judy Tegart (quarterfinals)
6. (United States) Carole Graebner (quarterfinals)
7. (Australia) Robyn Ebbern (quarterfinals)
8. (United Kingdom) Ann Jones (second round)
9. (Australia) Madonna Schacht (second round)
10. (Australia) Gail Sherriff (second round)
11. (Australia) Jill Blackman (third round)
12. (Australia) Helen Gourlay (third round)
13. (Argentina) Norma Baylon (third round)
14. (United Kingdom) Deidre Keller (second round)
15. (South Africa) Annette Van Zyl (semifinals)
16. (United Kingdom) Christine Truman (third round)

== Draw ==
=== Key ===
- Q = Qualifier
- WC = Wild card
- LL = Lucky loser
- r = Retired

=== Finals ===
Quarterfinals
1	(Australia) Margaret Smith	6	6
(France) Françoise Dürr	3	3
4	(United States) Billie Jean Moffitt	6	6
7	(Australia) Robyn Ebbern	1	2
6	(United States) Carole Graebner	3	4
15	(South Africa) Annette Van Zyl	6	6
5	(Australia) Judy Tegart	2	2
2	(Brazil) Maria Bueno	6	6

Semifinals
1	(Australia) Margaret Smith	6	8
4	(United States) Billie Jean Moffitt	1	6
15	(South Africa) Annette Van Zyl	2	3
2	(Brazil) Maria Bueno	6	6

Finals
1	(Australia) Margaret Smith	5	6	5
2	(Brazil) Maria Bueno	7	4	2^{r}

=== Earlier rounds ===
==== Section 1 ====
First round
(Australia) A Jenkins	6	6
(Australia) Marriott	3	4
13	(Argentina) Baylon	6	4	6
(Australia) Lesh	2	6	1
(Australia) Pratt	6	6
(Japan) Kuromatsu	1	2
(France) Dürr	6	6
(Australia) Dening	1	0
(Italy) Pericoli	6	6	6
(South Africa) Vukovich	3	8	2

Second round
1	(Australia) Smith	6	6
(Australia) A Jenkins	1	0
13	(Argentina) Baylon	6	6
(Australia) Pratt	3	0
8	(United Kingdom) Jones	3	0
(France) Dürr	6	6
11	(Australia) Blackman
(Italy) Pericoli	w/o

Third round
1	(Australia) Smith	7	6
13	(Argentina) Baylon	5	1
(France) Dürr	8	7
11	(Australia) Blackman	6	5

Quarterfinals
1	(Australia) Smith	6	6
(France) Dürr	3	3

==== Section 2 ====
First round
(Australia) Kynaston	6	6
(Japan) Matsumori	2	0
(Australia) Melville	6	12
(West Germany) Schildknecht	4	10
(Australia) Krantzcke	6	8
(Brazil) Schwartz	1	6
16	(United Kingdom) Truman	6	6
(Australia) Rae	3	0
(New Zealand) Terry	6	8	7
(Argentina) Somoza	4	10	5

Second round
4	(United States) Moffitt	6	6
(Australia) Kynaston	2	3
10	(Australia) Sherriff	8	4
(Australia) Melville	10	6
7	(Australia) Ebbern	9	6
(Australia) Krantzcke	7	2
16	(United Kingdom) Truman	6	6
(New Zealand) Terry	2	2

Third round
4	(United States) Moffitt	5	6	6
(Australia) Melville	7	4	1
7	(Australia) Ebbern	1	6	6
16	(United Kingdom) Truman	6	1	2

Quarterfinals
4	(United States) Moffitt	6	6
7	(Australia) Ebbern	1	2

==== Section 3 ====
First round
(Australia) Starr	2	6	6
(West Germany) Niessen	6	2	0
(Australia) Hawton	4	6	6
(Australia) Nette	6	4	4
(Australia) Whitely	5	6	6
(Australia) Fenton	7	3	4
15	(South Africa) Van Zyl	6	7
(Australia) Harris	2	5
(Australia) Southcombe	6	6
(United Kingdom) Trewby	4	4

Second round
(Australia) Starr	9	1	6
9	(Australia) Schacht	7	6	2
(Australia) Hawton	2	6
6	(United States) Graebner	6	8
(Australia) Whitely	4	3
15	(South Africa) Van Zyl	6	6
(Australia) Southcombe	6	4	5
3	(Australia) Turner	4	6	7

Third round
(Australia) Starr	4	2
6	(United States) Graebner	6	6
15	(South Africa) Van Zyl	6	7
3	(Australia) Turner	4	5

Quarterfinals
6	(United States) Graebner	3	4
15	(South Africa) Van Zyl	6	6

==== Section 4 ====
First round
(New Zealand) Morrison-Davy	6	6
(Japan) Obata	1	2
14	(United Kingdom) Keller	6	6
(Australia) Twitt	3	4
(France) Darmon	7	6
(Australia) Hunt	5	1
(South Africa) Lieffrig	6	6
(Australia) Schacht	3	3
(Australia) Begbie	6	6
(Italy) Gordigiani	4	4

Second round
(New Zealand) Morrison-Davy	3	6	6
14	(United Kingdom) Keller	6	4	2
(France) Darmon	4	6	7
5	(Australia) Tegart	6	4	9
(South Africa) Lieffrig	6	3	4
12	(Australia) Gourlay	0	6	6
(Italy) Gordigiani	2	2
2	(Brazil) Bueno	6	6

Third round
(New Zealand) Morrison-Davy	6	2	4
5	(Australia) Tegart	2	6	6
12	(Australia) Gourlay	2	4
2	(Brazil) Bueno	6	6

Quarterfinals
5	(Australia) Tegart	2	2
2	(Brazil) Bueno	6	6

Preceded by 1964 U.S. National Championships – Women's singles	Grand Slam women's singles	Succeeded by 1965 French Championships – Women's singles
