= Susan Butt =

Canadian sports psychologist and tennis player (born 1938)

- Full name: Dorcas Susan Butt
- Country (sports): Canada
- Born: March 19, 1938 (age 87)
- Plays: Right-handed

Singles

Grand Slam singles results
- French Open: 3R (1961)
- Wimbledon: 3R (1961)
- US Open: 1R (1957, 58, 59, 60, 66)

Doubles

Grand Slam doubles results
- French Open: 1R (1961)

Grand Slam mixed doubles results
- Wimbledon: 2R (1961)

Dorcas Susan Butt (born March 19, 1938) is a Canadian sports psychologist and former tennis player.

Raised in Victoria, British Columbia, Butt was the number one ranked Canadian player for three years and won a national championship in doubles. She won through to the singles third round of the 1961 Wimbledon Championships as a qualifier, before losing a centre court match to the top seeded Sandra Reynolds in 100 degree heat. In 1967 she made her playing debut for the Canada Federation Cup team and from 1970 to 1972 was the team captain. She is an inductee into both the Canada Tennis Hall of Fame (2000) and British Columbia Sports Hall of Fame (2023).

Butt holds a PhD in psychology from the University of Chicago and was a professor of psychology at the University of British Columbia for many years. In 1973 she married colleague Liam Finn, the Dean of Applied Science.

== See also ==
- List of Canada Fed Cup team representatives
