= 1962 Wightman Cup =

34th edition of the annual women's team tennis competition

Details
- Edition: 34th

Champion
- Winning nation: United States

The 1962 Wightman Cup was the 34th edition of the annual women's team tennis competition between the United States and Great Britain. It was held at the All England Lawn Tennis and Croquet Club in London in England in the United Kingdom.

Great Britain
3
All England Lawn Tennis and Croquet Club, London, England, United Kingdom
1962
Grass

United States
4

			1	2	3
1	(United Kingdom) (United States)	Christine Truman; Darlene Hard	2; 6	2; 6
2	(United Kingdom) (United States)	Ann Haydon; Karen Hantze Susman	10; 8	7; 5
3	(United Kingdom) (United States)	Deidre Catt; Nancy Richey	6; 1	7; 5
4	(United Kingdom) (United States)	Ann Haydon; Darlene Hard	3; 6	8; 6	4; 6
5	(United Kingdom) (United States)	Christine Truman; Karen Hantze Susman	4; 6	5; 7
6	(United Kingdom) (United States)	Deidre Catt / Elizabeth Starkie; Margaret Osborne duPont / Margaret Varner	3; 6	6; 2	2; 6
7	(United Kingdom) (United States)	Ann Haydon / Christine Truman; Darlene Hard / Billie Jean Moffitt	6; 4	6; 3
