= 1961 Wimbledon Championships – Girls' singles =

Girls' singles
- 1961 Wimbledon Championships

Final
- Champion: (Soviet Union) Galina Baksheeva
- Runner-up: (United States) Katherine Chabot
- Score: 6–4, 8–6

Details
- Draw: 18

Events
Singles	men	women		boys	girls
Doubles	men	women	mixed	boys	girls
← 1960 ·	Wimbledon Championships	· 1962 →

Galina Baksheeva defeated Katherine Chabot in the final, 6–4, 8–6 to win the girls' singles tennis title at the 1961 Wimbledon Championships.

== Draw ==
=== Key ===
- Q = Qualifier
- WC = Wild card
- LL = Lucky loser
- Alt = Alternate
- SE = Special exempt
- PR = Protected ranking
- ITF = ITF entry
- JE = Junior exempt
- w/o = Walkover
- r = Retired
- d = Defaulted
- SR = Special ranking

=== Finals ===
Semifinals
(United States) Katherine Chabot	6	6
(Mexico) Patricia Reyes	0	0
(United Kingdom) April O'Neill	3	1
(Soviet Union) Galina Baksheeva	6	6

Final
(United States) Katherine Chabot	4	6
(Soviet Union) Galina Baksheeva	6	8

=== Top half ===
First round
(Socialist Federal Republic of Yugoslavia) T Kokeza	w/o
(Poland) D Makulska

Second round
(United States) Katherine Chabot	6	6
(Republic of Ireland) B Burke	0	0
(Federation of Rhodesia and Nyasaland) Jenny Morris	4	3
(Denmark) Birgit Grage	6	6
(Mexico) Patricia Reyes	6	1	7
(Austria) T Steinhardt	1	6	5
(India) S Raphael	w/o
(Poland) D Makulska

Quarterfinals
(United States) K Chabot	6	6
(Denmark) B Grage	0	0
(Mexico) P Reyes	1	6	6
(Poland) D Makulska	6	2	3

Semifinals
(United States) K Chabot	6	6
(Mexico) P Reyes	0	0

=== Bottom half ===
First round
(Netherlands) Elsie Spruyt	1	9	3
(France) Chantal Langanay	6	7	6

Second round
(France) C Langanay	6	6
(Sweden) Ulla Sandulf	3	2
(Belgium) C Loeys	4	3
(United Kingdom) April O'Neill	6	6
(Norway) Liv Paldan	1	6	2
(West Germany) R Stollberg	6	1	6
(Switzerland) S Frolicher	1	2
(Soviet Union) Galina Baksheeva	6	6

Quarterfinals
(France) C Langanay	8	2
(United Kingdom) A O'Neill	10	6
(West Germany) R Stollberg	4	2
(Soviet Union) G Baksheeva	6	6

Semifinals
(United Kingdom) A O'Neill	3	1
(Soviet Union) G Baksheeva	6	6
