= 1961 Wimbledon Championships – Men's doubles =

Men's doubles
- 1961 Wimbledon Championships

Final
- Champions: (Australia) Roy Emerson (Australia) Neale Fraser
- Runners-up: (Australia) Bob Hewitt (Australia) Fred Stolle
- Score: 6–4, 6–8, 6–4, 6–8, 8–6

Details
- Draw: 64 (5Q)
- Seeds: 4

Events
Singles	men	women		boys	girls
Doubles	men	women	mixed	boys	girls
- Wimbledon Championships

Rafael Osuna and Dennis Ralston were the defending champions, but Osuna did not compete. Ralston competed with Chuck McKinley but lost in the quarterfinals to Roy Emerson and Neale Fraser.

Emerson and Fraser defeated Bob Hewitt and Fred Stolle in the final, 6–4, 6–8, 6–4, 6–8, 8–6 to win the gentlemen's doubles tennis title at the 1961 Wimbledon Championship.

== Seeds ==
1. (Australia) Roy Emerson / (Australia) Neale Fraser (champions)
2. (Australia) Rod Laver / (Australia) Bob Mark (semifinals)
3. (Italy) Nicola Pietrangeli / (Italy) Orlando Sirola (first round)
4. (Chile) Luis Ayala / (India) Ramanathan Krishnan (quarterfinals)

Click on the seed number of a player to go to their draw section.

== Draw ==
Key

- Q = Qualifier
- WC = Wild card
- LL = Lucky loser
- Alt = Alternate
- ITF = ITF entry
- PR = Protected ranking
- SR = Special ranking
- SE = Special exempt
- JE = Junior exempt
- JR = Junior Accelerator Programme entrant
- CO = College Accelerator Programme entrant
- NG = Next Gen Accelerator Program entrant
- w/o = Walkover
- r = Retired
- d = Defaulted

=== Finals ===
Quarterfinals
2	(Australia) Rod Laver (Australia) Bob Mark	6	7	6
(United Kingdom) Tony Pickard (United Kingdom) Mike Sangster	4	5	4
3	(Chile) Luis Ayala (India) Ramanathan Krishnan	6	1	1	8
(Australia) Bob Hewitt (Australia) Fred Stolle	4	6	6	10
(United Kingdom) Alan Mills (United Kingdom) Bobby Wilson	5	6	3	6	4
(Australia) Ken Fletcher (Australia) John Newcombe	7	3	6	1	6
(United States) Chuck McKinley (United States) Dennis Ralston	6	4	5	2
1	(Australia) Roy Emerson (Australia) Neale Fraser	2	6	7	6

Semifinals
2	(Australia) Rod Laver (Australia) Bob Mark	6	8	3	4
(Australia) Bob Hewitt (Australia) Fred Stolle	4	10	6	6
(Australia) Ken Fletcher (Australia) John Newcombe	8	9	1
1	(Australia) Roy Emerson (Australia) Neale Fraser	10	11	6

Final
(Australia) Bob Hewitt (Australia) Fred Stolle	4	8	4	8	6
1	(Australia) Roy Emerson (Australia) Neale Fraser	6	6	6	6	8

=== Top half ===
==== Section 1 ====
First round
2	(Australia) Rod Laver (Australia) Bob Mark	6	6	6
(Socialist Federal Republic of Yugoslavia) Boro Jovanović (Socialist Federal Republic of Yugoslavia) Ivko Plećević	2	2	4
(Norway) Finn-Dag Jagge (Norway) Thorvald Moe	7	8	6
Q	(United Kingdom) Trevor Adamson (United Kingdom) Charlie Applewhaite	5	6	2
(United States) Malcolm Fox (United States) Bobby Siska	6	1	1
(Australia) Neil Gibson (Australia) Barry Phillips-Moore	8	6	6
(Spain) Alberto Arilla (Spain) Manuel Santana	2	3	9	7	6
(Austria) Franz Hainka (Austria) Ladislav Legenstein	6	6	7	5	2
(United Kingdom) John Barrett (United Kingdom) Michael Hann	7	7	3	6	3
(West Germany) Ingo Buding (West Germany) Dieter Ecklebe	5	9	6	3	6
(India) Premjit Lall (India) Jaidip Mukerjea
(Sweden) Jan-Erik Lundqvist (Sweden) Ulf Schmidt	w/o
(United Kingdom) Tony Pickard (United Kingdom) Mike Sangster	4	6	8	6
(Venezuela) Isaías Pimentel (Chile) Patricio Rodríguez	6	1	6	0
(Italy) Giuseppe Merlo (Italy) Sergio Tacchini	3	7	12	2
(Argentina) Enrique Morea (Argentina) Eduardo Soriano	6	5	14	6

Second round
2	(Australia) R Laver (Australia) R Mark	6	6	6
(Norway) F-D Jagge (Norway) T Moe	1	1	3
(Australia) N Gibson (Australia) B Phillips-Moore	3	6	12	10
(Spain) A Arilla (Spain) M Santana	6	3	10	8
(West Germany) I Buding (West Germany) D Ecklebe	2	17	4	4
(India) P Lall (India) J Mukerjea	6	15	6	6
(United Kingdom) A Pickard (United Kingdom) M Sangster	6	6	3	4	6
(Argentina) E Morea (Argentina) E Soriano	2	3	6	6	3

Third round
2	(Australia) R Laver (Australia) R Mark	7	6	6
(Australia) N Gibson (Australia) B Phillips-Moore	5	2	3
(India) P Lall (India) J Mukerjea	4	7	5
(United Kingdom) A Pickard (United Kingdom) M Sangster	6	9	7

Quarterfinals
2	(Australia) R Laver (Australia) R Mark	6	7	6
(United Kingdom) A Pickard (United Kingdom) M Sangster	4	5	4

==== Section 2 ====
First round
3	(Chile) Luis Ayala (India) Ramanathan Krishnan	6	6	6
(United States) Ronnie Holmberg (United States) Budge Patty	2	3	4
(Colombia) William Álvarez (Brazil) José Edison Mandarino	8	1	2	4
(United States) Rudy Hernando (United Kingdom) Billy Knight	6	6	6	6
(United Kingdom) Geoffrey Paish (Australia) Warren Woodcock	2	6	3	2
(France) Pierre Darmon (France) Gérard Pilet	6	3	6	6
(United States) Frank Froehling (United States) Marty Riessen	6	6	6
(United Kingdom) Julian Coni (New Zealand) Mark Otway	0	3	2
(France) Jean Borotra (South Africa) Rod Mandelstam	4	0	2
(United States) Chris Crawford (United States) Jon Douglas	6	6	6
(Belgium) Jacques Brichant (Belgium) Philippe Washer	8	6	6
(New Zealand) Ian Crookenden (New Zealand) Lew Gerrard	6	2	3
(United States) Kingman Lambert (India) Narenda Nath	6	6	12
(Republic of Ireland) James Buckley (Republic of Ireland) Peter Jackson	2	0	10
(Australia) Bob Hewitt (Australia) Fred Stolle	9	6	10
Q	(United Kingdom) Gerry Oakley (United Kingdom) Humphrey Truman	7	2	8

Second round
3	(Chile) L Ayala (India) R Krishnan	6	6	6
(United States) R Hernando (United Kingdom) W Knight	2	2	2
(France) P Darmon (France) G Pilet	9	6	10	6
(United States) F Froehling (United States) M Riessen	11	4	12	8
(United States) C Crawford (United States) J Douglas	6	10	12	6
(Belgium) J Brichant (Belgium) P Washer	4	12	10	4
(United States) K Lambert (India) N Nath	12	2	4
(Australia) R Hewitt (Australia) F Stolle	14	6	6

Third round
3	(Chile) L Ayala (India) R Krishnan	6	6	8	6
(United States) F Froehling (United States) M Riessen	8	3	6	1
(United States) C Crawford (United States) J Douglas	1	7	4
(Australia) R Hewitt (Australia) F Stolle	6	9	6

Quarterfinals
3	(Chile) L Ayala (India) R Krishnan	6	1	1	8
(Australia) R Hewitt (Australia) F Stolle	4	6	6	10

=== Bottom half ===
==== Section 3 ====
First round
(Soviet Union) Toomas Leius (Soviet Union) Sergei Likhachev	5	6	6	6
(United States) Whitney Reed (Denmark) Jørgen Ulrich	7	4	4	4
(France) Daniel Contet (France) Jacques Renavand	4	6	3	4
(West Germany) Wilhelm Bungert (West Germany) Christian Kuhnke	6	1	6	6
(Poland) Wiesław Gąsiorek (Poland) Władysław Skonecki	6	3	1	2
(United Kingdom) Alan Mills (United Kingdom) Bobby Wilson	4	6	6	6
(Sweden) Ingemar Ingvarsson (Sweden) Staffan Stockenberg	1	1	1
(India) Akhtar Ali (India) Naresh Kumar	6	6	6
(Brazil) Ronnie Barnes (Brazil) Carlos Fernandes	10	12	6
Q	(West Germany) Harald Elschenbroich (Australia) Alan Lane	8	10	3
(Mexico) Mario Llamas (Mexico) Esteban Reyes Jr.	4	1	7
(Hungary) István Gulyás (Czechoslovakia) Jiří Javorský	6	6	9
Q	(United Kingdom) Geoff Ward (United Kingdom) Ivor Warwick	3	6	3	1
(Australia) Ken Fletcher (Australia) John Newcombe	6	3	6	6
(Australia) Will Coghlan (Australia) Bob Howe	6	1	9	6
3	(Italy) Nicola Pietrangeli (Italy) Orlando Sirola	4	6	7	3

Second round
(Soviet Union) T Leius (Soviet Union) S Likhachev	9	6	11
(West Germany) W Bungert (West Germany) C Kuhnke	7	4	9
(United Kingdom) A Mills (United Kingdom) R Wilson	6	6	6
(India) Akhtar Ali (India) Naresh Kumar	3	3	2
(Brazil) R Barnes (Brazil) C Fernandes	6	7	5	0	6
(Hungary) I Gulyás (Czechoslovakia) J Javorský	3	5	7	6	1
(Australia) K Fletcher (Australia) J Newcombe	6	1	9	6	6
(Australia) W Coghlan (Australia) R Howe	3	6	7	8	1

Third round
(Soviet Union) T Leius (Soviet Union) S Likhachev	6	4	4	2
(United Kingdom) A Mills (United Kingdom) R Wilson	2	6	6	6
(Brazil) R Barnes (Brazil) C Fernandes	2	6	5
(Australia) K Fletcher (Australia) J Newcombe	6	8	7

Quarterfinals
(United Kingdom) A Mills (United Kingdom) R Wilson	5	6	3	6	4
(Australia) K Fletcher (Australia) J Newcombe	7	3	6	1	6

==== Section 4 ====
First round
(Australia) Warren Jacques (Mexico) Antonio Palafox	4	6	6
(Chile) Ernesto Aguirre (Chile) Patricio Apey	6	8	8
(Canada) Robert Bédard (Canada) François Godbout	6	3	8	6	11
(United States) Donald Dell (United States) Crawford Henry	3	6	6	8	9
(United States) Bill Bond (United States) Al Driscole	3	4	6	6	8
(Australia) Barry Geraghty (United Kingdom) Roger Taylor	6	6	4	3	6
(South Africa) Bertie Gaertner (South Africa) Julie Mayer	3	8	4
(United States) Chuck McKinley (United States) Dennis Ralston	6	10	6
(France) Jean-Claude Barclay (France) François Jauffret	4	7	8	2	6
(South Africa) Frew McMillan (South Africa) Francis Rawstorne	6	5	6	6	3
(Australia) Martin Mulligan (West Germany) Wolfgang Stuck	4	6	8	9
(Federation of Rhodesia and Nyasaland) Adrian Bey (South Africa) Robin Sanders	6	1	6	7
Q	(United Kingdom) Peter Moys (United Kingdom) John Ward	2	3	4
(United States) Gardnar Mulloy (South Africa) Abe Segal	6	6	6
(Netherlands) Pieter van Eijsden (Netherlands) Willem Maris	1	4	3
1	(Australia) Roy Emerson (Australia) Neale Fraser	6	6	6

Second round
(Chile) E Aguirre (Chile) P Apey	5	5	3
(Canada) R Bédard (Canada) F Godbout	7	7	6
(United States) W Bond (United States) A Driscole	9	1	7	2	2
(United States) C McKinley (United States) D Ralston	7	6	5	6	6
(France) J-C Barclay (France) F Jauffret	3	7	6	6
(Australia) M Mulligan (West Germany) W Stuck	6	5	2	4
(United States) G Mulloy (South Africa) A Segal	3	1	3
1	(Australia) R Emerson (Australia) N Fraser	6	6	6

Third round
(Canada) R Bédard (Canada) F Godbout	3	2	3
(United States) C McKinley (United States) D Ralston	6	6	6
(France) J-C Barclay (France) F Jauffret	2	4	6	2
1	(Australia) R Emerson (Australia) N Fraser	6	6	4	6

Quarterfinals
(United States) C McKinley (United States) D Ralston	6	4	5	2
1	(Australia) R Emerson (Australia) N Fraser	2	6	7	6
