= 1963 U.S. National Championships – Women's singles =

Women's singles
- 1963 U.S. National Championships

Final
- Champion: (Brazil) Maria Bueno
- Runner-up: (Australia) Margaret Smith
- Score: 7–5, 6–4

Details
- Seeds: 12

Events
| Singles | men | women |
| Doubles | men | women |
- U.S. National Championships

Fourth-seeded Maria Bueno defeated first-seeded Margaret Smith 7–5, 6–4 in the final to win the women's singles tennis title at the 1963 U.S. National Championships.

== Seeds ==
The seeded players are listed below. Maria Bueno is the champion; others show in brackets the round in which they were eliminated.

1. (Australia) Margaret Smith (finalist)
2. (United States) Darlene Hard (quarterfinals)
3. (United States) Billie Jean Moffitt (fourth round)
4. (Brazil) Maria Bueno (champion)
5. (United States) Nancy Richey (quarterfinals)
6. (United Kingdom) Ann Haydon-Jones (semifinals)
7. (United Kingdom) Christine Truman (quarterfinals)
8. (Australia) Robyn Ebbern (third round)
9. (Czechoslovakia) Věra Suková (fourth round)
10. (United States) Carole Caldwell (fourth round)
11. (Argentina) Norma Baylon (fourth round)
12. (South Africa) Margaret Hunt (fourth round)

== Draw ==
=== Key ===
- Q = Qualifier
- WC = Wild card
- LL = Lucky loser
- r = Retired

=== Final eight ===
Quarterfinals
1 | (Australia) Margaret Smith | 3 | 6 | 6
7 | (United Kingdom) Christine Truman | 6 | 3 | 2
(Mexico) Yola Ramírez Ochoa
(United Kingdom) Deidre Catt | w/o
2 | (United States) Darlene Hard | 4 | 3
6 | (United Kingdom) Ann Haydon-Jones | 6 | 6
5 | (United States) Nancy Richey | 3 | 2
4 | (Brazil) Maria Bueno | 6 | 6

Semifinals
1 | (Australia) Margaret Smith | 6 | 6
(United Kingdom) Deidre Catt | 2 | 0
6 | (United Kingdom) Ann Haydon-Jones | 6 | 2 | 7
4 | (Brazil) Maria Bueno | 1 | 6 | 9

Finals
1 | (Australia) Margaret Smith | 5 | 4
4 | (Brazil) Maria Bueno | 7 | 6

| Preceded by 1963 Wimbledon Championships – Women's singles | Grand Slam women's singles | Succeeded by 1964 Australian Championships – Women's singles |
