= Danièle Bouteleux =

French tennis player

- Full name: Danièle Wild Bouteleux
- Country (sports): France
- Born: 20 November 1940 (age 84)

Singles

Grand Slam singles results
- French Open: 2R (1961, 1962, 1967, 1968, 1971, 1974)
- Wimbledon: 3R (1960, 1971)

Doubles

Grand Slam doubles results
- French Open: 2R (1959, 1961, 1964, 1965, 1967, 1971, 1973, 1974)
- Wimbledon: 2R (1961)

Grand Slam mixed doubles results
- French Open: 3R (1971)
- Wimbledon: 2R (1961)

Danièle Wild Bouteleux (born 20 November 1940) is a French former professional tennis player.

Bouteleux made her first main draw appearance at the French Championships in 1959 and was a regular participant at her home tournament, featuring for the last time in the 1980 French Open qualifiers. During this period she also competed at Wimbledon and made the singles third round twice. She married French tennis player Alain Bouteleux.
