= List of Argentina Fed Cup team representatives =

This is a list of tennis players who have represented the Argentina Fed Cup team in an official Fed Cup match. Argentina have taken part in the competition since 1964.

== Players ==
Player	W-L (Total)	W-L (Singles)	W-L (Doubles)	Ties	Debut
Beatriz Araujo	6 – 8	2 – 4	4 – 4	10	1972
María José Argeri	4 – 2	1 – 1	3 – 1	4	2006
Mailen Auroux	7 – 3	0 – 1	7 – 2	10	2010
Norma Baylon	3 – 4	2 – 2	1 – 2	4	1964
Ana-Maria Bocio	2 – 2	1 – 1	1 – 1	2	1964
Victoria Bosio	0 – 1	-	0 – 1	1	2014
Tatiana Búa	0 – 2	-	0 – 2	2	2015
María Lourdes Carlé	0 – 1	-	0 – 1	1	2016
Claudia Casabianca	1 – 1	1 – 0	0 – 1	2	1978
Celeste Contín	0 – 1	0 – 1	-	1	1998
Jorgelina Cravero	6 – 7	6 – 5	0 – 2	9	2007
Mariana Díaz Oliva	19 – 14	13 – 12	6 – 2	22	1997
Gisela Dulko	21 – 12	16 – 7	5 – 5	19	2000
Clarisa Fernández	8 – 3	6 – 3	2 – 0	9	2001
Bettina Fulco	9 – 6	6 – 3	3 – 3	11	1987
María José Gaidano	0 – 2	0 – 2	-	1	1997
Natalia Garbellotto	0 – 1	0 – 1	-	1	2003
Raquel Giscafré	18 – 15	12 – 7	6 – 8	20	1966
Liliana Giussani	1 – 1	-	1 – 1	2	1980
Viviana González	1 – 7	1 – 4	0 – 3	8	1976
Inés Gorrochategui	14 – 3	4 – 0	10 – 3	13	1990
Natalia Gussoni	3 – 3	2 – 2	1 – 1	3	2003
María Irigoyen	21 – 18	5 – 12	16 – 6	32	2008
Betina Jozami	2 – 4	1 – 2	1 – 2	4	2007
Erica Krauth	0 – 1	-	0 – 1	1	1998
Florencia Labat	24 – 17	19 – 13	5 – 4	26	1989
Emilse Longo	12 – 4	8 – 3	4 – 1	11	1979
Ivanna Madruga	10 – 10	7 – 6	3 – 4	13	1978
Florencia Molinero	11 – 4	10 – 3	1 – 1	11	2011
Laura Montalvo	11 – 7	0 – 1	11 – 6	17	1997
Graciela Moran	0 – 2	0 – 1	0 – 1	1	1966
Paula Ormaechea	16 – 12	16 – 10	0 – 2	18	2009
Mercedes Paz	21 – 12	8 – 8	13 – 4	22	1985
Catalina Pella	9 – 5	4 – 4	5 – 1	12	2016
Guadalupe Pérez Rojas	1 – 2	0 – 1	1 – 1	3	2016
Stephanie Mariel Petit	3 – 0	1 – 0	2 – 0	3	2018
Nadia Podoroska	8 – 5	8 – 1	0 – 4	12	2014
Ines Roget	0 – 7	0 – 4	0 – 3	4	1971
Gabriela Sabatini	24 – 6	13 – 3	11 – 3	15	1984
María Emilia Salerni	16 – 12	12 – 7	4 – 5	16	2000
Aranza Salut	0 – 4	0 – 3	0 – 1	4	2009
Nora Somoza	0 – 2	0 – 1	0 – 1	1	1965
Paola Suárez	14 – 5	12 – 4	2 – 1	12	1996
Patricia Tarabini	15 – 7	2 – 3	13 – 4	21	1989
Cristina Tessi	1 – 0	-	1 – 0	1	1988
Adriana Villagrán	7 – 10	4 – 3	3 – 7	12	1979
Elvira Weisenberger	5 – 9	3 – 3	2 – 6	12	1973
