= 1961 Wimbledon Championships – Boys' singles =

Boys' singles
- 1961 Wimbledon Championships

Final
- Champion: (United States) Clark Graebner
- Runner-up: (Austria) Ernst Blanke
- Score: 6–3, 9–7

Events
Singles	men	women		boys	girls
Doubles	men	women	mixed	boys	girls
← 1960 ·	Wimbledon Championships	· 1962 →

Clark Graebner defeated Ernst Blanke in the final, 6–3, 9–7 to win the boys' singles tennis title at the 1961 Wimbledon Championships.

== Draw ==
=== Key ===
- Q = Qualifier
- WC = Wild card
- LL = Lucky loser
- Alt = Alternate
- ITF = ITF entry
- PR = Protected ranking
- SR = Special ranking
- SE = Special exempt
- JE = Junior exempt
- JR = Junior Accelerator Programme entrant
- CO = College Accelerator Programme entrant
- NG = Next Gen Accelerator Program entrant
- w/o = Walkover
- r = Retired
- d = Defaulted

=== Finals ===
Semifinals
(Belgium) Claude De Gronckel	3	2
(United States) Clark Graebner	6	6
(Austria) Ernst Blanke	4	6	6
(United Kingdom) Stanley Matthews	6	4	2

Final
(United States) Clark Graebner	6	9
(Austria) Ernst Blanke	3	7

=== Top half ===
First round
(Sweden) H Eberstein	2	3
(Socialist Federal Republic of Yugoslavia) Đorđe Đukić	6	6
(West Germany) Detlev Nitsche	2	2
(France) Jean-Pierre Courcol	6	6

Second round
(Belgium) Claude De Gronckel	6	4	6
(Lebanon) Francis Samuel	2	6	3
(Portugal) C Pinho	6	0	3
(Denmark) J Elsmark	4	6	6
(United States) Clark Graebner	6	6
(Norway) J Horn	3	4
(Socialist Federal Republic of Yugoslavia) Đ Đukić	0	4
(France) J-P Courcol	6	6

Quarterfinals
(Belgium) C De Gronckel	8	6
(Denmark) J Elsmark	6	1
(United States) C Graebner	6	6
(France) J-P Courcol	4	4

Semifinals
(Belgium) C De Gronckel	3	2
(United States) C Graebner	6	6

=== Bottom half ===
First round
(Pakistan) Zulficar Rahim	3	6	4
(Monaco) Patrick Landau	6	2	6

Second round
(Monaco) P Landau	3	4
(Poland) Wiesław Biełanowicz	6	6
(Austria) Ernst Blanke	8	8
(Soviet Union) Nugzar Mdzinarishvili	6	6
(Switzerland) U Schafer	2	2
(Republic of Ireland) L Citron	6	6
(Netherlands) Tom Okker	2	2
(United Kingdom) Stanley Matthews	6	6

Quarterfinals
(Poland) Wiesław Biełanowicz	4	5
(Austria) E Blanke	6	7
(Republic of Ireland) L Citron	1	2
(United Kingdom) S Matthews	6	6

Semifinals
(Austria) E Blanke	4	6	6
(United Kingdom) S Matthews	6	4	2
