= Chantal Langanay =

French tennis player

- Country (sports): France
- Born: 11 April 1944 (age 80)

Singles

Grand Slam singles results
- French Open: 2R (1961, 63, 65, 66, 67)

Chantal Langanay (born 11 April 1944) is a French former professional tennis player.

Langanay, a native of Rouen, is the daughter of 1930s tennis player Jacques Langanay. During the 1960s she was a regular in the singles main draw of the French Championships and never progressed further than the second round.
