= Nora Somoza =

Argentine tennis player

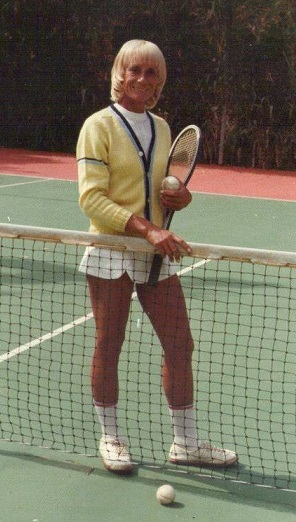
- Full name: Nora Bonifacino de Somoza
- Country (sports): Argentina
- Born: 8 August 1930
- Died: 17 January 2013 (aged 82)

Singles

Grand Slam singles results
- Australian Open: 1R (1965)
- French Open: 3R (1961)
- Wimbledon: 3R (1961)
- US Open: 1R (1959)

Grand Slam mixed doubles results
- Wimbledon: QF (1961)

Nora Bonifacino de Somoza (8 August 1930 — 17 January 2013) was an Argentine tennis player.

== Biography ==
Somoza, nicknamed "Norita", grew up in Coronel Suárez, Buenos Aires Province.

An Argentine number one, Somoza was active on tour in the 1950s and 1960s. She was a three-time winner of the Río de la Plata tournament and represented her country at the 1959 Pan American Games in Chicago.

In 1961 she reached the singles third rounds of both the French Championships and Wimbledon. She also teamed up with Reino Nyyssönen at Wimbledon to make the mixed doubles quarter-finals.

Somoza appeared for the Argentina Federation Cup team in a 1965 tie against New Zealand in Melbourne.

== See also ==
- List of Argentina Fed Cup team representatives
