= Gwyneth Thomas =

American tennis player

Gwyn Thomas
- Full name: Gwyneth Thomas
- Country (sports): United States
- Born: 9 July 1940
- Died: 10 October 2005 (aged 65)

Singles

Grand Slam singles results
- French Open: 1R (1959)
- Wimbledon: 2R (1960, 1962)
- US Open: QF (1962)

Doubles

Grand Slam doubles results
- French Open: QF (1959)
- Wimbledon: 1R (1959, 1960)
- US Open: SF (1960)

Gwyneth Thomas (9 July 1940 — 10 October 2005) was an American tennis player of the 1950s and 1960s.

A native of Shaker Heights, Ohio, Thomas was the youngest child of Charles and Gertrude Thomas. She developed her game at the local Cleveland Skating Club and in 1955 won an Orange Bowl title for the 15s age group.

Thomas, who had a best national ranking of sixth, won the singles title at the Cincinnati Open in 1958 and was a runner-up in doubles. She was runner-up to Dorothy Knode at the U.S. Women's Clay Court Championships in 1960. She was a member of the U.S. team for the 1961 Wightman Cup but didn't feature in any matches. In 1962 she upset Maria Bueno in the final of the San Juan international and made the quarter-finals of the U.S. National Championships.

In 1978 she was inducted into the Greater Cleveland Sports Hall of Fame.
