= Belmar Gunderson =

American tennis player (1934–2023)

- Country (sports): United States
- Born: September 7, 1934 Fort Sill, Oklahoma, U.S.
- Died: May 15, 2023 (aged 88) Oviedo, Florida, U.S.

Singles

Grand Slam singles results
- French Open: 2R (1963)
- Wimbledon: 3R (1959)
- US Open: QF (1955)

Doubles

Grand Slam doubles results
- French Open: 2R (1961)
- Wimbledon: QF (1964)
- US Open: QF (1960)

Grand Slam mixed doubles results
- Wimbledon: 3R (1959, 1961)
- US Open: SF (1961)

Belmar Gunderson (September 7, 1934 – May 15, 2023) was an American tennis player.

Gunderson, the daughter of an Army colonel, was born in Fort Sill, Oklahoma, and she lived in various other military bases during her childhood, including in post-war Germany where she began playing tennis aged 13.

A diminutive player, Gunderson served as captain of the U.S. junior Wightman Cup side. She celebrated her 21st birthday by beating the second-seeded Louise Brough at the 1955 U.S. National Championships to reach the quarterfinals. As a doubles player, she was ranked as high as two in the U.S., winning titles at the Canadian Championships and U.S. Indoor Championships.

Gunderson retired as a player in 1965 and completed a doctorate at Texas Woman's University. From 1974 to 1976, she served as the first women's athletics director for the University of Minnesota.

Gunderson died on May 15, 2023, at the age of 88.
