= Pat Stewart =

American tennis player (born 1934)

- Full name: Patricia Ann Stewart
- Country (sports): United States
- Born: August 19, 1934 (age 92)
- Height: 5 ft 8 in (173 cm)
- Plays: Right-handed

Grand Slam singles results
- French Open: 2R (1961, 1963)
- Wimbledon: 3R (1961)
- US Open: 2R (1951, 53, 57, 58, 64, 67, 68)

Grand Slam mixed doubles results
- Wimbledon: 4R (1959)
- US Open: SF (1965)

Patricia Ann Stewart (born August 19, 1934) is an American former tennis player.

A New Yorker, Stewart was active on tour in the 1950s and 1960s.

Stewart made the singles third round of the 1961 Wimbledon Championships, losing to Margaret Smith (Court), then three months later married English cricketer John Edrich. The marriage lasted four years.

In 1965 she made the mixed doubles semi-finals of the 1965 U.S. National Championships with John Mangan.
