= Lynne Nette =

Australian tennis player

- Country (sports): South Africa; Australia
- Born: 26 May 1942 (age 83)

Singles

Grand Slam singles results
- Australian Open: 2R (1963, 1968)
- French Open: 3R (1961)
- Wimbledon: 4R (1960)

Doubles

Grand Slam doubles results
- Australian Open: QF (1963, 1968)
- French Open: QF (1961)
- Wimbledon: SF (1961)

Grand Slam mixed doubles results
- Australian Open: 2R (1963, 1965)
- French Open: 3R (1961)
- Wimbledon: 4R (1961)

Lynne Nette (born 26 May 1942), previously known as Lynette Hutchings, is a South African-born Australian former professional tennis player active in the 1960s and 1970s.

Nette, a junior Wimbledon finalist, was ranked as high as number two in her native South Africa. In 1961 she moved to Australia and married tennis player Neville Nette. Some of her best career performances were at Wimbledon, where she made the round of 16 in singles and semi-finals in women's doubles (with Margaret Hunt in 1961).
