= Joan Gibson =

Australian tennis player

- Full name: Joan Gibson Cottrill
- Country (sports): Australia

Singles

Grand Slam singles results
- Australian Open: QF (1966)
- French Open: 2R (1961)
- Wimbledon: 3R (1967)

Doubles

Grand Slam doubles results
- Australian Open: SF (1963, 1964)
- French Open: 2R (1961)
- Wimbledon: 2R (1967)

Grand Slam mixed doubles results
- Australian Open: SF (1966)
- French Open: 1R (1961)
- Wimbledon: QF (1967)

Joan Gibson Cottrill is an Australian former tennis player of the 1960s.

Gibson, a double-handed player, comes from a tennis family, as a niece of Jack Crawford and sister of Neil Gibson.

In 1966 she reached the quarter-finals of the Australian Championships with an upset win over the third-seeded Lesley Turner. She also made the mixed doubles semi-finals that year, partnering future husband John Cottrill.

Gibson had a top national ranking of three, behind Margaret Court and Lesley Turner.
