= Neil Gibson (tennis) =

Australian tennis player

- Country (sports): Australia
- Plays: Right-handed

Singles

Grand Slam singles results
- Australian Open: 3R (1959)
- French Open: 4R (1957)
- Wimbledon: 2R (1957)

Neil Gibson is an Australian former tennis player.

Gibson's mother Lottie was the sister of tennis player Jack Crawford. He is the brother of Joan Gibson and cousin of Allan Kendall, who were both tour players. As a junior in 1954 he registered wins over Neale Fraser, Roy Emerson and Geoff Brown. He was the youngest ever player to win the South Coast championships. In 1957 he came from two sets down to upset the top seeded Lew Hoad in the third round of the 1957 French Championships. He caused another upset at the 1959 Australian Championships by beating the eighth seed Butch Buchholz.
