= Meryl Mark =

South African tennis player

- Full name: Meryl Laura Mark
- Country (sports): South Africa
- Born: 1 March 1938; Cape Town, South Africa
- Died: 16 September 2006 (aged 68); Creighton, South Africa

Singles

Grand Slam singles results
- French Open: 2R (1961)
- Wimbledon: 3R (1959)
- US Open: 2R (1961)

Doubles

Grand Slam doubles results
- Wimbledon: 1R (1960, 1961)

Grand Slam mixed doubles results
- French Open: 2R (1961)
- Wimbledon: 3R (1959)
- US Open: 2R (1961)

Meryl Laura Mark (1 March 1938 — 16 September 2006) was a South African tennis player.

Mark grew up in Boksburg on the East Rand and is the elder sister of tennis player John Hammill. She competed briefly on the international circuit, notably reaching the third round of the 1959 Wimbledon Championships.

In 1961 she married Australian tennis player Bob Mark and couple settled in South Africa.
