= Margot Dittmeyer =

German tennis player

- Country (sports): West Germany
- Born: 7 August 1935 (age 89)

Singles

Grand Slam singles results
- French Open: 1R (1956, 1958)
- Wimbledon: 4R (1960)
- US Open: 4R (1962)

Margot Dittmeyer-Dohrer (born 7 August 1935) is a German former tennis player.

A three-time national singles champion, Dittmeyer was active on tour in the 1950s and 1960s.

In 1963 she took part in West Germany's first ever Federation Cup tie, teamed with Edda Buding and Renate Ostermann. She played her team's second singles rubber, losing in three sets to France's Janine Lieffrig.
