= Florence de la Courtie-Billat =

French tennis player (1935–2023)

- Country (sports): France
- Born: 13 November 1935
- Died: 17 December 2023 (aged 88)

Singles

Grand Slam singles results
- French Open: 3R (1959, 1960, 1962)
- Wimbledon: 4R (1961)
- US Open: 3R (1962)

Doubles

Grand Slam doubles results
- French Open: QF (1962)
- Wimbledon: 3R (1958)

Grand Slam mixed doubles results
- French Open: 3R (1970)
- Wimbledon: 4R (1958)

Florence de la Courtie-Billat (13 November 1935 – 17 December 2023) was a French tennis player.

Active on tour in the 1950s and 1960s, de la Courtie-Billat reached the top of the French rankings during her career. She made the singles round of 16 at the 1961 Wimbledon Championships and was a women's doubles quarter-finalist at the 1962 French Championships (with Françoise Dürr).

De la Courtie-Billat died on 17 December 2023, at the age of 88.
