= Jiří Javorský =

Czech tennis player (1932–2002)

- Country (sports): Czechoslovakia
- Born: 9 February 1932 Prague, Czechoslovakia
- Died: 16 September 2002 (aged 70) Heilbronn, Germany

Singles

Grand Slam singles results
- French Open: 3R (1959, 1963)
- Wimbledon: 2R
- US Open: 2R

Grand Slam mixed doubles results
- French Open: W (1957)

Jiří Javorský (9 February 1932 – 16 September 2002) was a Czech tennis player. Javorský played in the Davis Cup for Czechoslovakia between 1955 and 1966. In 1957, he and his partner Věra Suková won the mixed doubles at the French Open. In 1968 Javorský moved to Germany where he became a tennis coach.

== Grand Slam finals ==
=== Mixed doubles: 2 (1 title, 1 runner-up) ===
Result	Year	Championship	Surface	Partner	Opponents	Score
Win	1957	French Championships	Clay	(Czechoslovakia) Věra Pužejová	(West Germany) Edda Buding (Chile) Luis Ayala	6–3, 6–4
Loss	1961	French Championships	Clay	(Czechoslovakia) Věra Suková	(United States) Darlene Hard (Australia) Rod Laver	0–6, 6–2, 3–6

== Honours ==
- French Championships: Last 32 in 1959 & 1963

== Personal life ==
In order to take up his coaching role in Germany, Jiří and his wife Vera moved to Heilbronn in 1968. One of their two sons was allowed by the Czech authorities to go with them but the other one, Jaroslav, was kept in Czechoslovakia as security for the family's eventual return. When he and his fiancée Anna tried to escape in 1978, they were arrested and imprisoned. The Javorskys tried through Amnesty International and others to obtain their son's release. This was achieved via a prisoner exchange in 1986, mainly through the efforts of the Campaign for the defence of the Unjustly Prosecuted (CDUP), led by Josef Josten, an exiled Czech journalist, and Lord Braine, a British politician.
