= Pauline Roberts =

British professional tennis player

- Full name: Pauline Roberts Cox
- Country (sports): United Kingdom

Singles

Grand Slam singles results
- Wimbledon: 2R (1961, 62, 64, 65, 66)
- US Open: 4R (1962)

Doubles

Grand Slam doubles results
- Wimbledon: 3R (1961, 1964)

Grand Slam mixed doubles results
- Wimbledon: 4R (1960)

Pauline Roberts Cox (nee Titchener) is a British former professional tennis player.

A Kent county player, Roberts competed on tour in the 1950s and 1960s. Amongst her best performances, she reached the fourth round in mixed doubles at the 1960 Wimbledon Championships and the fourth round in singles at the 1962 U.S. National Championships. Her tour titles include Barcelona, Guildford and Lowther.

Roberts was the first coach of tennis player Annabel Croft. She was initially hired to coach her mother, but encouraged nine-year old Croft to take to the court and discovered her potential.
