= Márta Peterdy-Wolf =

Hungarian tennis player (1923–2024)

- Country (sports): Hungary; France
- Born: 21 February 1923; Budapest, Hungary
- Died: 16 April 2024 (aged 101)
- Plays: Right-handed

Singles

Grand Slam singles results
- French Open: 3R (1947, 1948, 1958, 1961)
- Wimbledon: 3R (1948, 1953)
- US Open: 2R (1961)

Doubles

Grand Slam doubles results
- French Open: 3R (1959)
- Wimbledon: 2R (1947, 1948, 1961, 1962)

Grand Slam mixed doubles results
- French Open: 3R (1957, 1958, 1963)
- Wimbledon: 3R (1953)

Márta Peterdy-Wolf (née Popp; 21 February 1923 – 16 April 2024) was a Hungarian professional tennis player.

== Biography ==
Márta Popp was born in Budapest on 21 February 1923. A four-time national singles champion, she also competed at national championship level as a figure skater early in her sporting career. She featured regularly at the French Championships and Wimbledon from the 1940s through to the 1960s, making it as far as the third round in both tournaments. Following the Hungarian Revolution of 1956 she lived in exile in the French capital, Paris and was considered stateless.

Peterdy-Wolf turned 100 in February 2023, and died on 16 April 2024, at the age of 101.
