= 1961 Wimbledon Championships =

- Date: 26 June – 8 July
- Edition: 75th
- Category: Grand Slam
- Surface: Grass
- Location: Church Road; SW19, Wimbledon, London, United Kingdom
- Venue: All England Lawn Tennis and Croquet Club

Champions

Men's singles
- (Australia) Rod Laver

Women's singles
- (United Kingdom) Angela Mortimer

Men's doubles
- (Australia) Roy Emerson / (Australia) Neale Fraser

Women's doubles
- (United States) Karen Hantze / (United States) Billie Jean Moffitt

Mixed doubles
- (Australia) Fred Stolle / (Australia) Lesley Turner

Boys' singles
- (United States) Clark Graebner

Girls' singles
- (Soviet Union) Galina Baksheeva
- Wimbledon Championships

The 1961 Wimbledon Championships took place on the outdoor grass courts at the All England Lawn Tennis and Croquet Club in Wimbledon, London, United Kingdom. The tournament ran from 26 June until 8 July. It was the 75th staging of the Wimbledon Championships, and the third Grand Slam tennis event of 1961.

== Champions ==
=== Seniors ===
==== Men's singles ====
(Australia) Rod Laver defeated (United States) Chuck McKinley, 6–3, 6–1, 6–4

==== Women's singles ====
(United Kingdom) Angela Mortimer defeated (United Kingdom) Christine Truman, 4–6, 6–4, 7–5

==== Men's doubles ====
(Australia) Roy Emerson / (Australia) Neale Fraser defeated (Australia) Bob Hewitt / (Australia) Fred Stolle, 6–4, 6–8, 6–4, 6–8, 8–6

==== Women's doubles ====
(United States) Karen Hantze / (United States) Billie Jean Moffitt defeated (Australia) Jan Lehane / (Australia) Margaret Smith, 6–3, 6–4

==== Mixed doubles ====
(Australia) Fred Stolle / (Australia) Lesley Turner defeated (Australia) Robert Howe / (West Germany) Edda Buding, 11–9, 6–2

=== Juniors ===
==== Boys' singles ====
(United States) Clark Graebner defeated (Austria) Ernst Blanke, 6–3, 9–7

==== Girls' singles ====
(Soviet Union) Galina Baksheeva defeated (United States) Katherine Chabot, 6–4, 8–6

Preceded by 1961 French Championships	Grand Slams	Succeeded by 1961 U.S. National Championships
