= Caroline Yates-Bell =

British tennis player

- Country (sports): United Kingdom

Singles

Grand Slam singles results
- Wimbledon: 3R (1956)
- US Open: 1R (1963)

Doubles

Grand Slam doubles results
- Wimbledon: 3R (1956, 1958, 1960, 1961)

Grand Slam mixed doubles results
- Wimbledon: 4R (1962)
- US Open: QF (1963)

Caroline Yates-Bell (born 1936) is a British former tennis player.

Yates-Bell is the only daughter of London surgeon Geoffrey Yates-Bell and Winifred Perryman.

Active in the 1950s and 1960s, Yates-Bell's career included a 6–2, 6–0 win over Billie Jean Moffitt at the 1962 Queen's Club Championships. She was a mixed doubles quarter-finalist at the 1963 U.S. National Championships.

In 1964 she married Northern Irish doctor Ian Hamilton.
