= Marlene Gerson =

South African tennis player (born 1940)

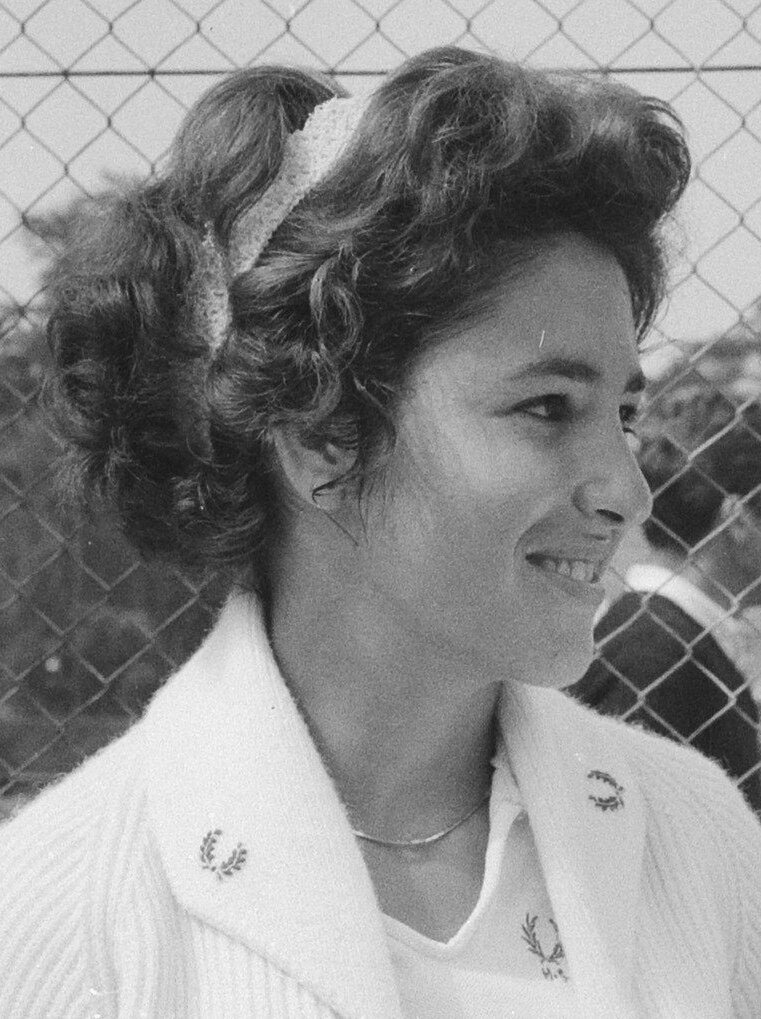
- Marlene Gerson (1962)
- Country (sports): South Africa
- Born: June 1940 (age 85)

Singles

Grand Slam singles results
- French Open: 2R (1961)
- Wimbledon: 3R (1959)

Doubles

Grand Slam doubles results
- Wimbledon: QF (1961)

Grand Slam mixed doubles results
- Wimbledon: 2R (1960, 1961, 1962)
Medal record
Maccabiah Games
Gold medal – first place	1961 Israel	Women's doubles
Gold medal – first place	1961 Israel	Mixed doubles
Silver medal – second place	1961 Israel	Women's singles

Marlene Gerson (born June 1940) is a female former tennis player from South Africa who was active in the late 1950s and the first half of the 1960s. Her best singles result at the Wimbledon Championships was reaching the third round in 1959. Partnering Australian Eva Duldig, she reached the quarterfinal of the doubles event in 1961. At the 1961 Maccabiah Games in Israel, she won gold medals in women's doubles and mixed doubles.

== Career ==
In 1962 Gerson won the All England Plate, a competition held at the Wimbledon Championships consisting of players who were defeated in the first or second rounds of the singles competition. Gerson had lost in the first round of the singles event against Kaye Dening in straight sets after having qualified for the 1962 Wimbledon Championships at a grass court tournament in Roehampton. At the All England Plate event she won all five rounds in straight sets, including the final against Margaret Hellyer.

Her best singles result at Wimbledon was reaching the third round in 1959 which she lost in straight sets to Rosie Reyes. Partnering Australian Eva Duldig she reached the quarterfinal of the doubles event in 1961, in which they were beaten by the fourth-seeded team of Sally Moore and Lesley Turner.

Gerson is Jewish, and at the 1961 Maccabiah Games in Israel, she won a gold medal in women's doubles, and playing with South African Rod Mandelstam she won the mixed doubles gold medal. In singles, she won a silver medal.

At the Dutch Open in Hilversum she reached the semifinal of the singles event in 1962 which she lost to compatriot Sandra Price in two sets. Together with Price she won the doubles final against Judy Tegart and Eva de Jongh.
