= Yola Ramírez =

Mexican tennis player (1935–2025)

- Full name: Yolanda del Monte Carmelo Ramírez y Partida
- Country (sports): Mexico
- Born: 1 March 1935 Teziutlán, Puebla, Mexico
- Died: 9 March 2025 (aged 90)
- Plays: Right–handed

Singles
- Career record: 375-143 (72.4%)
- Career titles: 51
- Highest ranking: No. 6 (1961)

Grand Slam singles results
- Australian Open: SF (1962)
- French Open: F (1960, 1961)
- Wimbledon: QF (1959, 1961)
- US Open: QF (1961, 1963)

Doubles

Grand Slam doubles results
- French Open: W (1958)
- Wimbledon: SF (1957, 1958, 1959)
- US Open: F (1961)

Grand Slam mixed doubles results
- Australian Open: SF (1962)
- French Open: W (1958)
- Wimbledon: SF (1959)

Yolanda del Monte Carmelo Ramírez y Partida (1 March 1935 – 9 March 2025), known simply as Yola Ramírez, was a Mexican tennis player active in the 1950s and 1960s who was twice a singles finalist and once a women's doubles champion and mixed doubles champion at the French Open.

== Biography ==
Ramírez was a singles finalist at the French Championships in 1960 and 1961. She lost the 1960 final to Darlene Hard and the 1961 final to Ann Haydon. She also was a quarterfinalist at Wimbledon in 1959 and 1961, a quarterfinalist at the 1961 and 1963 U.S. Championships, a semifinalist at the 1962 Australian Championships, a semifinalist at the 1959 Italian Championships, and a finalist in Monte Carlo in 1959. She won the German Championships in 1957 and was a finalist in 1961.

Ramirez teamed with Rosie Reyes to win the women's doubles title at the 1958 French Championships and to reach the final at the 1957 and 1959 French Championships. She teamed with Billy Knight to win the mixed doubles title at the 1959 French Championships. With Edda Buding, she reached the women's doubles final at the 1961 U.S. Championships. She also won the women's doubles titles at the Italian Championships and in Monte Carlo, both in 1960.

At the tournament in Cincinnati, Ramirez won the singles title in 1956 and the doubles title (with Sara Mae Turber) in 1955. She was a doubles finalist in 1956.

In 1959, she won the South of France Championships in Nice, France.

Ramírez won the singles titles at the 1960 Mexico National Championships and the 1961 Caribbean Lawn Tennis Championship.

During her career, Ramírez had wins over Billie Jean King (in the second round of Wimbledon in 1961, which was King's first appearance at the tournament), Jones, and Christine Truman.

According to Lance Tingay of The Daily Telegraph and the Daily Mail, Ramírez was ranked in the world top 10 in 1957 and from 1959 through 1961, reaching a career high of world no. 6 in 1961.

Ramírez married Alfonso Ochoa on 29 August 1962. She died on 9 March 2025, at the age of 90.

== Grand Slam finals ==
=== Singles (2 runners-up) ===
Result	Year	Championship	Surface	Opponent	Score
Loss	1960	French Championships	Clay	(United States) Darlene Hard	3–6, 4–6
Loss	1961	French Championships	Clay	(United Kingdom) Ann Haydon	2–6, 1–6

=== Doubles (1 title, 3 runners-up) ===
Result	Year	Championship	Surface	Partner	Opponents	Score
Loss	1957	French Championships	Clay	(Mexico) Rosie Reyes	(United Kingdom) Shirley Bloomer (United States) Darlene Hard	5–7, 6–4, 5–7
Win	1958	French Championships	Clay	(Mexico) Rosie Reyes	(Australia) Mary Bevis Hawton (Australia) Thelma Coyne Long	6–4, 7–5
Loss	1959	French Championships	Clay	(Mexico) Rosie Reyes	(South Africa) Sandra Reynolds (South Africa) Renée Schuurman	6–2, 0–6, 1–6
Loss	1961	US Open	Grass	(West Germany) Edda Buding	(United States) Darlene Hard (Australia) Lesley Turner	4–6, 7–5, 0–6

=== Mixed doubles (1 title) ===
Result	Year	Championship	Surface	Partner	Opponents	Score
Win	1959	French Championships	Clay	(United Kingdom) Billy Knight	(Australia) Rod Laver (South Africa) Renée Schuurman	6–4, 6–4

== Grand Slam singles tournament timeline ==
Key
W	F	SF	QF	#R	RR	Q#	DNQ	A	NH

(W) winner; (F) finalist; (SF) semifinalist; (QF) quarterfinalist; (#R) rounds 4, 3, 2, 1; (RR) round-robin stage; (Q#) qualification round; (DNQ) did not qualify; (A) absent; (NH) not held; (SR) strike rate (events won / competed); (W–L) win–loss record.

Tournament	1955	1956	1957	1958	1959	1960	1961	1962	1963	Career SR
Australian Championships	A	A	A	A	A	A	A	SF	A	0 / 1
French Championships	A	A	3R	4R	4R	F	F	A	2R	0 / 6
Wimbledon	A	A	2R	3R	QF	3R	QF	A	1R	0 / 6
U.S. Championships	3R	1R	A	A	A	A	QF	A	QF	0 / 4
SR	0 / 1	0 / 1	0 / 2	0 / 2	0 / 2	0 / 2	0 / 3	0 / 1	0 / 3	0 / 17

== See also ==
- Performance timelines for all female tennis players since 1978 who reached at least one Grand Slam final
