= 1961 French Championships (tennis) =

- Date: 15–28 May 1961
- Edition: 60
- Category: 31st Grand Slam (ITF)
- Surface: Clay
- Location: Paris (XVI^{e}), France
- Venue: Stade Roland Garros

Champions

Men's singles
- (Spain) Manuel Santana

Women's singles
- (United Kingdom) Ann Haydon

Men's doubles
- (Australia) Roy Emerson / (Australia) Rod Laver

Women's doubles
- (South Africa) Sandra Reynolds / (South Africa) Renee Schuurman

Mixed doubles
- (United States) Darlene Hard / (Australia) Rod Laver
- French Championships

The 1961 French Championships (now known as the French Open) was a tennis tournament that took place on the outdoor clay courts at the Stade Roland-Garros in Paris, France. The tournament ran from 15 May until 28 May. It was the 60th staging of the French Championships, and the second Grand Slam tennis event of 1961. Manuel Santana and Ann Haydon won the singles titles.

== Finals ==
=== Men's singles ===
(Spain) Manuel Santana defeated (Italy) Nicola Pietrangeli 4–6, 6–1, 3–6, 6–0, 6–2

=== Women's singles ===
(United Kingdom) Ann Haydon defeated (Mexico) Yola Ramírez 6–2, 6–1

=== Men's doubles ===
(Australia) Roy Emerson / (Australia) Rod Laver defeated (Australia) Bob Howe / (Australia) Bob Mark 3–6, 6–1, 6–1, 6–4

=== Women's doubles ===
(South Africa) Sandra Reynolds / (South Africa) Renee Schuurman defeated (Brazil) Maria Bueno / (United States) Darlene Hard walkover

=== Mixed doubles ===
(United States) Darlene Hard / (Australia) Rod Laver defeated (Czechoslovakia) Vera Suková / (Czechoslovakia) Jirí Javorský 6–0, 2–6, 6–3

Preceded by 1961 Australian Championships	Grand Slams	Succeeded by 1961 Wimbledon Championships
