= Sally Moore (tennis) =

American tennis player (born 1940)

- Full name: Sally Moore Huss
- Country (sports): United States
- Born: June 8, 1940 (age 85) Long Beach, California, U.S.
- Plays: Right-handed

Singles
- Highest ranking: No. 9 (1959)

Grand Slam singles results
- Wimbledon: SF (1959)
- US Open: QF (1958)

Doubles

Grand Slam doubles results
- Wimbledon: SF (1961)
- US Open: F (1959)

Grand Slam mixed doubles results
- Wimbledon: QF (1959, 1961)

Sally Moore Huss (born June 8, 1940) is a former American tennis player. Moore grew up in Bakersfield, California. She won several national titles and was part of the 1959 Wightman Cup team. In 1958, she won the Wimbledon junior championship and made it to the women's singles semi-finals of the 1959 Wimbledon Championships. After retiring at the age of 21, she worked in Hollywood before pursuing a career as an author and artist. Her art has been exhibited in 27 galleries, including her own Sally Huss Gallery.

== Personal life ==
Moore Huss was born on 8 June 1940 in Long Beach, California. She is the daughter of Laurren Moore (an oil refinery manager) and Marie Moore (a homemaker). Huss married Marv Huss (CEO of Sally Huss, Inc.) on December 31, 1976. Her son, Mike Huss, continued the tennis tradition in the family by achieving a number 2 ranking in San Diego County’s 18-under class in 1997. He also earned a tennis scholarship to the University of Arizona.

== Education ==
Huss attended Occidental College from 1958 to 1961. She received no scholarship despite being ranked the number 1 tennis junior in the world. She later attended the University of California where she got a degree in fine arts.

== Career ==
=== Tennis ===
Moore won several national titles in her tennis career. In 1958, she was an under-18 national champion. Further national titles came at the U.S. hard court championships (1958) and U.S. clay court championships (1959). She was also part of the 1959 Wightman Cup team, playing both singles and doubles. In 1958, she won the Wimbledon junior championship and made it to the women's singles semifinals of the 1959 Wimbledon Championships, where she was defeated by Maria Bueno. She partnered with Bueno to reach the women's doubles finals of the 1959 U.S. National Championships, in which they were defeated by Jeanne Arth and Darlene Hard. Moore ended 1959 with a career-best singles ranking of nine in the world. Huss retired at the age of 21 due to physical injuries when tennis was still an amateur sport but remained involved in tennis as a part-time coach. She made a brief comeback in the Virginia Slims tennis tournament where she met her husband, Marv, and also played competitive senior tennis starting in 1981.

Grand Slam doubles final

Result	Year	Championship	Surface	Partner	Opponents	Score
Loss	1959	U.S. Championships	Grass	(Brazil) Maria Bueno	(United States) Jeanne Arth (United States) Darlene Hard	2–6, 3–6

=== Art ===
In 1985, Sally Huss started showcasing her art at local shows and street fairs, and in 1987, she opened her own Sally Huss Gallery at 1958 Village Center Circle. Marv Huss, who had previously worked as a marketing director for Hallmark Cards, became her business manager in 1992, helping to open three more galleries and generate $1 million in annual sales. Huss also wrote books. Today, Huss' books and art pieces are sold in galleries across the country, including San Diego, Balboa, Indianapolis, and Nags Head, N.C.

=== Film ===
In 1963, Huss conducted research and worked on the production of several films for Samuel Goldwyn, J.r. In 1967, Huss collaborated with Paul Simon’s music publishing company.

== Achievements ==
Tennis

- 1958. National Junior Tennis Champion
- 1958. Wimbledon Junior Tennis Champion
- 1959. U.S. National Clay Court Championship
- Last Eight Club

Writing

- How to Play Power Tennis with Ease, Harcourt (New York, NY), 1976.
- (Illustrator) Bob Carlisle, Butterfly Kisses (children's book), Tommy Nelson, 1997.
- (Author and illustrator) I Love You with All My Hearts (children's book), Tommy Nelson, 1998.
- The Happy Book (inspirational), Ten Speed/Celestial Arts, 1999.
- I Love You With All My Hearts: The Many Ways a Mother Loves Her Child, T. Nelson (Nashville, TN), 2004.
- (With Rocky Lang) Lara Takes Charge, HLPI Books (Northridge, CA), 2004.

Art

- By 1999 the businesses she associated with had sold over 10 million pieces of gift art. The products Sally Huss had designed recorded sales of over 5 million dollars.
- Created “Happy Child”, a special work of art, as a birthday gift for Hillary Clinton.
