= Margaret Hunt (tennis) =

South African tennis player (born 1942)

- Full name: Margaret Lilian Hunt
- Country (sports): South Africa
- Born: 25 April 1942 (age 84)

Grand Slam singles results
- French Open: 3R (1963)
- Wimbledon: 4R (1961, 1963)
- US Open: 4R (1963)

Grand Slam doubles results
- French Open: SF (1963)
- Wimbledon: SF (1961)

Grand Slam mixed doubles results
- French Open: QF (1963)
- Wimbledon: QF (1963)

Margaret Lilian Hunt (born 25 April 1942) is a South African former professional tennis player

Active in the 1960s, Hunt reached women's doubles semi-finals at both the French Championships and Wimbledon. In the 1963 Federation Cup, the tournament's inaugural edition, Hunt was a member of the South African team with Renée Schuurman. She won each of her singles and doubles rubbers in the first two ties, against Czechoslovakia and France, to set up a semi-final versus Australia. Schuurman lost the opening rubber, but Hunt looked like levelling the tie when she led Jan Lehane by a set and 5–0, before the Australian came back to won, eliminating the South Africans.

Hunt, who comes from Pretoria, was married to the late Johann Barnard, who headed the SA Tennis Union.

She was the daughter of Eric Pfeilitzer Hunt (1911-2007) and Margaret Evelyn Colenbrander (1916-1999).

== See also ==
- List of South Africa Fed Cup team representatives
