= Liz Starkie =

British former tennis player (born 1938)

- Full name: Elizabeth Starkie
- Country (sports): United Kingdom
- Born: 31 August 1938
- Plays: Right-handed

Singles

Grand Slam singles results
- Australian Open: QF (1963)
- French Open: 4R (1962, 1965)
- Wimbledon: 4R (1961, 1963)

Elizabeth Starkie (born 31 August 1938) is a British former tennis player. She became Elizabeth Wagstaff after marriage. Active during the 1960s, Starkie represented Great Britain in both Federation Cup and Wightman Cup tennis.

Starkie, a native of Yorkshire, competed in the Wightman Cup from 1962 to 1966 and was the doubles partner of Ann Jones in Britain's run to the semi-finals of the 1966 Federation Cup. She was a singles quarter-finalist at the 1963 Australian Championships, where she also reached the semi-finals in doubles.
