= Deidre Catt =

British tennis player (born 1940)

- Country (sports): United Kingdom
- Born: 4 July 1940 (age 85)
- Plays: Right–handed

Singles

Grand Slam singles results
- Australian Open: 2R (1965)
- French Open: 4R (1964)
- Wimbledon: 4R (1962, 1964)
- US Open: SF (1963)

Doubles

Grand Slam doubles results
- French Open: QF (1961, 1962, 1964)
- Wimbledon: QF (1960)
- US Open: F (1960)

Grand Slam mixed doubles results
- French Open: QF (1961, 1962, 1964)
- Wimbledon: QF (1962, 1964)

Deidre Catt (born 4 July 1940) is a former tennis player from the United Kingdom who was active in the 1960s.

Her best performance at a Grand Slam tournament was reaching the final of the doubles event at the 1960 U.S. Championships. Partnering compatriot Ann Haydon they lost the final in straight sets to Maria Bueno and Darlene Hard. Her best Grand Slam singles performance was reaching the semifinal of the 1963 U.S. Championships in which she lost to Margaret Court, having beaten Billie-Jean Moffit King in the last 16. At the Wimbledon Championships she reached the fourth round in 1962 and 1964.

Between 1961 and 1964, Catt played in four Wightman Cups, a women's team tennis competition between the United States and Great Britain. During the 1962 Wightman Cup she defeated Nancy Richey. From 1963 to 1965, she was a member of the British Federation Cup team and compiled a record of six wins and two losses.

In 1960 she won the All England Plate, a tennis competition held at the Wimbledon Championships for players who were defeated in the first or second rounds of the singles competition. In the final, she was victorious against Lorna Cawthorn. In that year, she won the West of England championships at Bristol by beating Sandra Reynolds in the second round and Renée Schuurman in the final.

In 1961 and 1963, she won the singles title at the Surrey Grass Court Championships in Surbiton, defeating Edda Buding and Darlene Hard in the respective finals. Catt was a runner-up at the British Hard Court Championships in 1961, losing the final to Angela Mortimer in straight sets. Catt became the singles champion at the 1963 British Covered Court Championships after three-set victories in the semifinal against Ann Jones and the final against Renée Schuurman. Partnering Elizabeth Starkie, she reached the doubles final of the 1963 Pacific Coast Championships in which they were beaten by Maria Bueno and Darlene Hard.

In November 1964, she married John Keller. Later, she remarried Noel McMahon, an Australian.

== Grand Slam tournament finals ==
=== Doubles: 1 runner-up ===
Result	Year	Championship	Surface	Partner	Opponents	Score
Loss	1960	U.S. Championships	Clay	(United Kingdom) Ann Haydon	(Brazil) Maria Bueno (United States) Darlene Hard	1–6, 1–6
