= 1959 in tennis =

This page covers all the important events in the sport of tennis in 1959. It provides the results of notable tournaments throughout the year on both the men's and women's ILTF tennis circuits.

== Australian Open ==
Category	Champion(s)	Finalist(s)	Score
Men's singles	(United States) Alex Olmedo	(Australia) Neale Fraser	6–1, 6–2, 3–6, 6–3
Women's singles	(Australia) Mary Carter Reitano	(South Africa) Renee Schuurman	6–2, 6–3
Men's doubles	(Australia) Rod Laver (Australia) Robert Mark	(Australia) Don Candy (Australia) Bob Howe	9–7, 6–4, 6–2
Women's doubles	(South Africa) Sandra Reynolds (South Africa) Renée Schuurman	(Australia) Lorraine Coghlan (Australia) Mary Reitano	7–5, 6–4
Mixed doubles	(South Africa) Sandra Reynolds (Australia) Bob Mark	(South Africa) Renée Schuurman (Australia) Rod Laver	4–6, 13–11, 6–1

== French Open ==
Category	Champion(s)	Finalist(s)	Score
Men's singles	(Italy) Nicola Pietrangeli	(South Africa) Ian Vermaak	3–6, 6–3, 6–4, 6–1
Women's singles	(United Kingdom) Christine Truman	(Hungary) Zsuzsi Körmöczy	6–4, 7–5
Men's doubles	(Italy) Nicola Pietrangeli (Italy) Orlando Sirola	(Australia) Roy Emerson (Australia) Neale Fraser	6–3, 6–2, 14–12
Women's doubles	(South Africa) Sandra Reynolds (South Africa) Renée Schuurman	(Mexico) Yola Ramírez (Mexico) Rosie Reyes	2–6, 6–0, 6–1
Mixed doubles	(Mexico) Yola Ramírez (United Kingdom) Billy Knight	(South Africa) Renée Schuurman (Australia) Rod Laver	6–4, 6–4

== Wimbledon ==
Category	Champion(s)	Finalist(s)	Score
Men's singles	(United States) Alex Olmedo	(Australia) Rod Laver	6–4, 6–3, 6–4
Women's singles	(Brazil) Maria Bueno	(United States) Darlene Hard	6–4, 6–3
Men's doubles	(Australia) Roy Emerson (Australia) Neale Fraser	(Australia) Rod Laver (Australia) Bob Mark	8–6, 6–3, 14–16, 9–7
Women's doubles	(United States) Jeanne Arth (United States) Darlene Hard	(United States) Beverly Fleitz (United Kingdom) Christine Truman	2–6, 6–2, 6–3
Mixed doubles	(Australia) Rod Laver (United States) Darlene Hard	(Australia) Neale Fraser (Brazil) Maria Bueno	6–4, 6–3

== US Open ==
Category	Champion(s)	Finalist(s)	Score
Men's singles	(Australia) Neale Fraser	(United States) Alex Olmedo	6–3, 5–7, 6–2, 6–4
Women's singles	(Brazil) Maria Bueno	(United Kingdom) Christine Truman	6–1, 6–4
Men's doubles	(Australia) Neale Fraser (Australia) Roy Emerson	(United States) Alex Olmedo (United States) Earl Buchholz	3–6, 6–3, 5–7, 6–4, 7–5
Women's doubles	(United States) Jeanne Arth (United States) Darlene Hard	(Brazil) Maria Bueno (United States) Sally Moore	6–2, 6–3
Mixed doubles	(United States) Margaret Osborne duPont (Australia) Neale Fraser	(United States) Janet Hopps (Australia) Bob Mark	7–5, 13–15, 6–2
