= 1962 in tennis =

This page covers all the important events in the sport of tennis in 1962. It provides the results of notable tournaments throughout the year on both the men's and women's ILTF tennis circuits.

== Australian Open ==
Category	Champion(s)	Finalist(s)	Score
Men's singles	(Australia) Rod Laver	(Australia) Roy Emerson	8–6, 0–6, 6–4, 6–4
Women's singles	(Australia) Margaret Smith	(Australia) Jan Lehane	6–0, 6–2
Men's doubles	(Australia) Roy Emerson (Australia) Neale Fraser	(Australia) Bob Hewitt (Australia) Fred Stolle	4–6, 4–6, 6–1, 6–4, 11–9
Women's doubles	(Australia) Robyn Ebbern (Australia) Margaret Smith	(United States) Darlene Hard (Australia) Mary Carter Reitano	6–4, 6–4
Mixed doubles	(Australia) Lesley Turner (Australia) Fred Stolle	(United States) Darlene Hard (United Kingdom) Roger Taylor	6–3, 9–7

== French Open ==
Category	Champion(s)	Finalist(s)	Score
Men's singles	(Australia) Rod Laver	(Australia) Roy Emerson	3–6, 2–6, 6–3, 9–7, 6–2
Women's singles	(Australia) Margaret Smith	(Australia) Lesley Turner	6–3, 3–6, 7–5
Men's doubles	(Australia) Roy Emerson (Australia) Neale Fraser	(West Germany) Wilhelm Bungert (West Germany) Christian Kuhnke	6–3, 6–4, 7–5
Women's doubles	(South Africa) Sandra Price (South Africa) Renée Schuurman	(United States) Justina Bricka (Australia) Margaret Smith	6–4, 6–4
Mixed doubles	(South Africa) Renée Schuurman (Australia) Bob Howe	(Australia) Lesley Turner (Australia) Fred Stolle	3–6, 6–4, 6–4

== Wimbledon ==
Category	Champion(s)	Finalist(s)	Score
Men's singles	(Australia) Rod Laver	(Australia) Martin Mulligan	6–2, 6–2, 6–1
Women's singles	(United States) Karen Susman	(Czechoslovakia) Věra Suková	6–4, 6–4
Men's doubles	(Australia) Bob Hewitt (Australia) Fred Stolle	(Socialist Federal Republic of Yugoslavia) Boro Jovanović (Socialist Federal Republic of Yugoslavia) Nikola Pilić	6–2, 5–7, 6–2, 6–4
Women's doubles	(United States) Billie Jean Moffitt (United States) Karen Susman	(South Africa) Sandra Price (South Africa) Renée Schuurman	5–7, 6–3, 7–5
Mixed doubles	(Australia) Neale Fraser (United States) Margaret duPont	(United States) Dennis Ralston (United Kingdom) Ann Haydon	2–6, 6–3, 13–11

== US Open ==
Category	Champion(s)	Finalist(s)	Score
Men's singles	(Australia) Rod Laver	(Australia) Roy Emerson	6–2, 6–4, 5–7, 6–4
Women's singles	(Australia) Margaret Smith	(United States) Darlene Hard	9–7, 6–4
Men's doubles	(Mexico) Rafael Osuna (Mexico) Antonio Palafox	(United States) Chuck McKinley (United States) Dennis Ralston	6–4, 10–12, 1–6, 9–7, 6–3
Women's doubles	(Brazil) Maria Bueno (United States) Darlene Hard	(United States) Karen Hantze Susman (United States) Billie Jean Moffitt	4–6, 6–3, 6–2
Mixed doubles	(Australia) Margaret Smith (Australia) Fred Stolle	(Australia) Lesley Turner (United States) Frank Froehling	7–5, 6–2
