= 1959 in sports =

1959 in sports describes the year's events in world sport.

== American football ==
- NFL Championship: the Baltimore Colts won 31–16 over the New York Giants at Baltimore's Memorial Stadium
- August 14 – The American Football League is founded. Play would begin the following year.
- Sugar Bowl (1958 season):
  - The LSU Tigers won, 7–0, over the Clemson Tigers to win the AP and Coaches Poll national championships.

== Association football ==
Brazil

- Taca Brasil, as predecessor for Campeonato Brasileiro Serie A, that first officially games held on August 23.

Turkey

- Turkish National League, as predecessor for Super Lig of Turkey, that first officially game held on February 21.

== Athletics ==
- Pan American Games athletics held in Chicago with US sprinter Ray Norton winning three gold medals in the sprint events

== Baseball ==
- March 3 – The San Francisco Giants officially name their new stadium Candlestick Park.
- May 26 – In what many experts call the greatest pitching performance in history, Harvey Haddix—suffering with a flu and sore throat—hurls a 12 inning perfect game for the Pittsburgh Pirates but loses in the 13th inning 0–1 on a Don Hoak fielding error to the Milwaukee Braves as lightning storms threaten the end of the game.
- June 25 - Emperor Hirohito, watched Japanese professional baseball game for first time in Korakuen Baseball Stadium, Tokyo, Japan. At final resulting to Tokyo Giants win over Hanshin Tigers 5 to 4 in a home run by Shigeo Nagashima from Minoru Murayama.
- World Series – Los Angeles Dodgers win 4 games to 2 over the Chicago White Sox. The Series MVP is Larry Sherry, Los Angeles
- The Havana Sugar Kings defeat the Richmond Virginians to win the International League Governors' Cup.
- The Minneapolis Millers win the American Association championship.
- Havana wins 4 games to 3 over Minneapolis to win the Junior World Series.
- The Salt Lake City Bees win the Pacific Coast League pennant.
- The Winnipeg Goldeyes win the Northern League championship.

== Basketball ==
- FIBA World Championship
  - Brazil World Champion
- NCAA Men's Basketball Championship –
  - California wins 71–70 over West Virginia
- NBA Finals –
  - Boston Celtics win 4 games to 0 over the Minneapolis Lakers

== Boxing ==
- June 26 – in New York City, Ingemar Johansson scored a 3rd-round TKO over Floyd Patterson to win the World Heavyweight Championship
- August 27 to September 7 – Pan American Games held in Chicago, United States

== Bowling ==
Nine-pin bowling

- Nine-pin bowling World Championships –
  - Men's champion: Eberhard Luther, East Germany
  - Women's champion: Hilde Beljan, East Germany
  - Men's team champion: Yugoslavia
  - Women's team champion: East Germany

== Canadian football ==
- Grey Cup – Winnipeg Blue Bombers win 21–7 over the Hamilton Tiger-Cats

== Cricket ==
- During a Currie Cup match against Natal at the Jan Smuts Ground in East London in December, Border set the record (which still stands) for the lowest aggregate score by a first class side in a match. Border scored 34 runs in the match – 16 in the first innings and 18 in the second innings.

== Curling ==
- Inaugural World Curling Championships held in Falkirk and Edinburgh for men only and known as the "Scotch Cup"; it is won by a Canadianteam from Regina, Saskatchewan, skipped by Ernie Richardson

== Figure skating ==
- World Figure Skating Championship –
  - Men's champion: David Jenkins, United States
  - Ladies' champion: Carol Heiss, United States
  - Pair skating champion: Barbara Wagner & Robert Paul, Canada
  - Ice dancing champion: Doreen Denny & Courtney Jones, Great Britain

== Golf ==
Men's professional

- Masters Tournament – Art Wall, Jr.
- U.S. Open – Billy Casper
- British Open – Gary Player
- PGA Championship – Bob Rosburg
- PGA Tour money leader – Art Wall, Jr. – $53,168
- Ryder Cup – United States 8½ to 3½ over Britain in team golf

Men's amateur

- British Amateur – Deane Beman
- U.S. Amateur – Jack Nicklaus

Women's professional

- Women's Western Open – Betsy Rawls
- LPGA Championship – Betsy Rawls
- U.S. Women's Open – Mickey Wright
- Titleholders Championship – Louise Suggs
- LPGA Tour money leader – Betsy Rawls – $26,774

== Horse racing ==
Steeplechases

- Cheltenham Gold Cup – Roddy Owen
- Grand National – Oxo

Flat races

- Australia – Melbourne Cup won by Macdougal
- Canadian Triple Crown races:
  1. Queen's Plate – New Providence
  2. Prince of Wales Stakes – New Providence
  3. Breeders' Stakes – New Providence
  - New Providence becomes the first horse ever to win all three races.
- France – Prix de l'Arc de Triomphe won by Saint Crespin
- Ireland – Irish Derby Stakes won by Fidalgo
- English Triple Crown races:
  1. 2,000 Guineas Stakes – Taboun
  2. The Derby – Parthia
  3. St. Leger Stakes – Cantelo
- United States Triple Crown races:
  1. Kentucky Derby – Tomy Lee
  2. Preakness Stakes – Royal Orbit
  3. Belmont Stakes – Sword Dancer

== Ice hockey ==
- Art Ross Trophy as the NHL's leading scorer during the regular season: Dickie Moore, Montreal Canadiens
- Hart Memorial Trophy for the NHL's Most Valuable Player: Andy Bathgate, New York Rangers
- Stanley Cup – Montreal Canadiens win 4 games to 1 over the Toronto Maple Leafs
- World Hockey Championship
  - Men's champion: Belleville McFarlands from Canada
- NCAA Men's Ice Hockey Championship – University of North Dakota Fighting Sioux defeat Michigan State University Spartans 4–3 in overtime in Troy, New York
- The Hershey Bears defeat the Buffalo Bisons 4 games to 2 to win the AHL Calder Cup.
- The Louisville Rebels defeat the Fort Wayne Komets 4 games to 2 to win the IHL Turner Cup.
- On November 1, Montreal Canadiens goaltender Jacques Plante was injured when struck in the face by a flying puck. He offers to return to play on the condition that he wears his goalie mask. His example soon leads to the mask becoming standard equipment for goalies and a symbol of the game itself.
- The TV-pucken tournament starts.

== Rugby league ==
- 1959 New Zealand rugby league season
- 1958–59 Northern Rugby Football League season/1959–60 Northern Rugby Football League season
- 1959 NSWRFL season
- 1959–60 Kangaroo tour

== Rugby union ==
- 65th Five Nations Championship series is won by France, the team's first outright championship title

== Swimming ==
- July 11 – US swimmer Michael Troy breaks his own first official world record (2:19.0), set earlier in the day, in the men's 200m butterfly (long course) at a meet in Los Altos, California, clocking 2:16.4.
- July 19 – US swimmer Becky Collins breaks the world record in the women's 200m butterfly at a meet in Redding, California, clocking 2:37.0.

== Tennis ==
Australia

- Australian Men's Singles Championship – Alex Olmedo (USA) defeats Neale Fraser (Australia) 6–1, 6–2, 3–6, 6–3
- Australian Women's Singles Championship – Mary Carter Reitano (Australia) defeats Renee Schuurman Haygarth (South Africa) 6–2, 6–3

England

- Wimbledon Men's Singles Championship – Alex Olmedo (USA) defeats Rod Laver (Australia) 6–4, 6–3, 6–4
- Wimbledon Women's Singles Championship – Maria Bueno (Brazil) defeats Darlene Hard (USA) 6–4, 6–3

France

- French Men's Singles Championship – Nicola Pietrangeli (Italy) defeats Ian Vermaak (South Africa) 3–6, 6–3, 6–4, 6–1
- French Women's Singles Championship – Christine Truman (Great Britain) defeats Zsuzsa Körmöczy (Hungary) 6–4, 7–5

USA

- American Men's Singles Championship – Neale Fraser (Australia) defeats Alex Olmedo (USA) 6–3, 5–7, 6–2, 6–4
- American Women's Singles Championship – Maria Bueno (Brazil) defeats Christine Truman (Great Britain) 6–1, 6–4

Davis Cup

- 1959 Davis Cup – Australia 3–2 United States at West Side Tennis Club (grass) New York City, United States

== Volleyball ==
- Volleyball at the 1959 Pan American Games in Chicago won by USA (men) and Brazil (women)

== Multi-sport events ==
- Central American and Caribbean Games held in Caracas, Venezuela
- Third Pan American Games held in Chicago, United States
- Third Mediterranean Games held in Beirut, Lebanon
- First Summer Universiade held in Turin, Italy

== Awards ==
- Associated Press Male Athlete of the Year – Ingemar Johansson, Boxing
- Associated Press Female Athlete of the Year – Maria Bueno, Tennis
