= 1960 Australian Championships =

- Date: 22 January-1 February 1960
- Edition: 48th
- Category: Grand Slam (ITF)
- Surface: Grass
- Location: Brisbane, Australia
- Venue: Milton Courts

Champions

Men's singles
- (Australia) Rod Laver

Women's singles
- (Australia) Margaret Smith

Men's doubles
- (Australia) Rod Laver / (Australia) Bob Mark

Women's doubles
- (Brazil) Maria Bueno / (United Kingdom) Christine Truman

Mixed doubles
- (Australia) Jan Lehane / (South Africa) Trevor Fancutt
- Australian Championships

The 1960 Australian Championships was a tennis tournament that took place on outdoor Grass courts at the Milton Courts, Brisbane, Australia from 22 January to 1 February. It was the 48th edition of the Australian Championships (now known as the Australian Open), the 5th held in Brisbane, and the first Grand Slam tournament of the year. The singles titles were won by Rod Laver and Margaret Smith.

== Champions ==
=== Men's singles ===
(Australia) Rod Laver defeated (Australia) Neale Fraser 5–7, 3–6, 6–3, 8–6, 8–6

=== Women's singles ===
(Australia) Margaret Smith defeated (Australia) Jan Lehane 7–5, 6–2

=== Men's doubles ===
(Australia) Rod Laver / (Australia) Bob Mark defeated (Australia) Roy Emerson / (Australia) Neale Fraser 1–6, 6–2, 6–4, 6–4

=== Women's doubles ===
(Brazil) Maria Bueno / (United Kingdom) Christine Truman defeated (Australia) Lorraine Robinson / (Australia) Margaret Smith 6–2, 5–7, 6–2

=== Mixed doubles ===
(Australia) Jan Lehane / (South Africa) Trevor Fancutt defeated (Australia) Mary Carter Reitano / (Australia) Bob Mark 6–2, 7–5

Preceded by 1959 U.S. National Championships	Grand Slams	Succeeded by 1960 French Championships
