= 1959 French Championships (tennis) =

- Date: 19–31 May 1959
- Edition: 58
- Category: 29th Grand Slam (ITF)
- Surface: Clay
- Location: Paris (XVI^{e}), France
- Venue: Stade Roland Garros

Champions

Men's singles
- (Italy) Nicola Pietrangeli

Women's singles
- (United Kingdom) Christine Truman

Men's doubles
- (Italy) Nicola Pietrangeli / (Italy) Orlando Sirola

Women's doubles
- (South Africa) Sandra Reynolds Price / (South Africa) Renée Schuurman

Mixed doubles
- (Mexico) Yola Ramírez / (United Kingdom) Billy Knight
- French Championships

The 1959 French Championships (now known as the French Open) was a tennis tournament that took place on the outdoor clay courts at the Stade Roland-Garros in Paris, France. The tournament ran from 19 May until 31 May. It was the 58th staging of the French Championships, and the second Grand Slam tennis event of 1959. Nicola Pietrangeli and Christine Truman won the singles titles.

== Finals ==
=== Men's singles ===
(Italy) Nicola Pietrangeli defeated (South Africa) Ian Vermaak 3–6, 6–3, 6–4, 6–1

=== Women's singles ===
(United Kingdom) Christine Truman defeated (Hungary) Zsuzsi Körmöczy 6–4, 7–5

=== Men's doubles ===
(Italy) Nicola Pietrangeli / (Italy) Orlando Sirola defeated (Australia) Roy Emerson / (Australia) Neale Fraser 6–3, 6–2, 14–12

=== Women's doubles ===
(South Africa) Sandra Reynolds / (South Africa) Renée Schuurman defeated (Mexico) Yola Ramírez / (Mexico) Rosie Reyes 2–6, 6–0, 6–1

=== Mixed doubles ===
(Mexico) Yola Ramírez / (United Kingdom) Billy Knight defeated (South Africa) Renée Schuurman / (Australia) Rod Laver 6–4, 6–4

| Preceded by 1959 Australian Championships | Grand Slams | Succeeded by 1959 Wimbledon Championships |
