= 1961 Australian Championships – Women's singles =

Women's singles
- 1961 Australian Championships

Final
- Champion: (Australia) Margaret Smith
- Runner-up: (Australia) Jan Lehane
- Score: 6–1, 6–4

Details
- Draw: 44
- Seeds: 8

Events
Singles	men	women
Doubles	men	women
- Australian Championships

First-seeded Margaret Smith defeated Jan Lehane 6–1, 6–4 in the final to win the women's singles tennis title at the 1961 Australian Championships.

== Seeds ==
The seeded players are listed below. Margaret Smith is the champion; others show the round in which they were eliminated.

1. (Australia) Margaret Smith (champion)
2. (Australia) Jan Lehane (finalist)
3. (Australia) Lesley Turner (third round)
4. (Australia) Mary Carter Reitano (semifinals)
5. (Australia) Mary Bevis Hawton (quarterfinals)
6. (Australia) Maureen Pratt (third round)
7. (Australia) Lorraine Coghlan (quarterfinals)
8. (Australia) Beverley Rae (third round)

== Draw ==
=== Key ===
- Q = Qualifier
- WC = Wild card
- LL = Lucky loser
- r = Retired

=== Finals ===
Quarterfinals
1	(Australia) Margaret Smith	6	6
(Australia) Kaye Dening	4	3
(Australia) Val Wicks	4	2
(Australia) Robyn Ebbern	6	6
5	(Australia) Mary Bevis Hawton	4	2
4	(Australia) Mary Carter Reitano	6	6
7	(Australia) Lorraine Coghlan	2	2
2	(Australia) Jan Lehane	6	6

Semifinals
1	(Australia) Margaret Smith	6	6
(Australia) Robyn Ebbern	2	0
4	(Australia) Mary Carter Reitano	3	6	1
2	(Australia) Jan Lehane	6	4	6

Finals
1	(Australia) Margaret Smith	6	6
2	(Australia) Jan Lehane	1	4

=== Earlier rounds ===
==== Section 1 ====
First round

Second round
1	(Australia) Smith	6	6
(Australia) McLean	0	0
(Australia) Astley	8	0	0
(Australia) Whitely	6	6	6
8	(Australia) Rae	7	6
(Australia) Toyne	5	2
(Australia) Hall Hopman	1	1
(Australia) Dening	6	6

Third round
1	(Australia) Smith	6	6
(Australia) Whitely	4	2
8	(Australia) Rae	2	6	1
(Australia) Dening	6	3	6

Quarterfinals
1	(Australia) Smith	6	6
(Australia) Dening	4	3

==== Section 2 ====
First round
(Australia) Wicks	6	6
(Australia) Paterson	0	1
(Australia) Rayson	6	1	6
(Australia) McKee	2	6	2
6	(Australia) Pratt	6	6
(Australia) Gibson	0	2
(Australia) Ross	6	6
(Australia) Craig	4	2
(Australia) N Turner	6	6
(Australia) McArthur	0	2
(Australia) Ebbern	6	6
(United Kingdom) Cox	2	1

Second round
3	(Australia) L Turner	6	6
(Australia) Robinson	2	3
(Australia) Wicks	6	1	8
(Australia) Rayson	3	6	6
6	(Australia) Pratt	6	6
(Australia) Ross	4	3
(Australia) N Turner	0	4
(Australia) Ebbern	6	6

Third round
3	(Australia) L Turner	w/o
(Australia) Wicks
6	(Australia) Pratt	6	4	4
(Australia) Ebbern	3	6	6

Quarterfinals
(Australia) Wicks	4	2
(Australia) Ebbern	6	6

==== Section 3 ====
First round
(Australia) Southam	6	4	6
(Australia) Plaisted	2	6	4
(Australia) Robberds	6	6
(Australia) Hicks	1	2
(Australia) Schacht	6	6
(Australia) Slattery	1	0
5	(Australia) Bevis Hawton	6	6
(Australia) Buck	1	2
(Australia) Thiele	6	6
(Australia) Ockerby	3	1
(Australia) Blackman	6	6
(Australia) Duldig	2	4

Second round
(Australia) Southam	4	4
(Australia) Robberds	6	6
(Australia) Schacht	2	3
5	(Australia) Bevis Hawton	6	6
(Australia) Thiele	4	6
(Australia) Blackman	6	8
(Australia) Lesh	4	2
4	(Australia) Carter Reitano	6	6

Third round
(Australia) Robberds	6	1	1
5	(Australia) Bevis Hawton	4	6	6
(Australia) Blackman	6	3	6
4	(Australia) Carter Reitano	4	6	8

Quarterfinals
5	(Australia) Bevis Hawton	4	2
4	(Australia) Carter Reitano	6	6

==== Section 4 ====
First round

Second round
(Australia) Tegart	6	6
(Australia) Gugeri	0	2
(Australia) Toohey	1	3
7	(Australia) Coghlan	6	6
(Australia) Shipton	4	6	6
(Australia) Harris	6	1	4
(Australia) Marie Burke	0	0
2	(Australia) Lehane	6	6

Third round
(Australia) Tegart	4	8	4
7	(Australia) Coghlan	6	6	6
(Australia) Shipton	2	1
2	(Australia) Lehane	6	6

Quarterfinals
7	(Australia) Coghlan	6	6
2	(Australia) Lehane	2	2

Preceded by 1960 U.S. National Championships – Women's singles	Grand Slam women's singles	Succeeded by 1961 French Championships – Women's singles
