= 1960 Australian Championships – Women's singles =

Women's singles
- 1960 Australian Championships

Final
- Champion: (Australia) Margaret Smith
- Runner-up: (Australia) Jan Lehane
- Score: 7–5, 6–2

Details
- Draw: 32
- Seeds: 8

Events
Singles	men	women
Doubles	men	women
- Australian Championships

Seventh-seeded Margaret Smith defeated Jan Lehane 7–5, 6–2 in the final to win the women's singles tennis title at the 1960 Australian Championships. This was Smith's 1st of a record 24 Grand Slam titles.

== Seeds ==
The seeded players are listed below. Margaret Smith is the champion; others show the round in which they were eliminated.

1. (Brazil) Maria Bueno (quarterfinals)
2. (United Kingdom) Christine Truman (semifinals)
3. (Australia) Jan Lehane (finalist)
4. (Australia) Mary Carter Reitano (semifinals)
5. (Australia) Lorraine Coghlan (quarterfinals)
6. (Australia) Beverley Rae (second round)
7. (Australia) Margaret Smith (champion)
8. (Australia) Betty Holstein (second round)

== Draw ==
=== Key ===
- Q = Qualifier
- WC = Wild card
- LL = Lucky loser
- r = Retired

=== Finals ===
Quarterfinals
1	(Brazil) Maria Bueno	5	6	4
7	(Australia) Margaret Smith	7	3	6
4	(Australia) Mary Carter Reitano	6	8
(Australia) Mary Bevis Hawton	2	6
5	(Australia) Lorraine Coghlan	1	1
3	(Australia) Jan Lehane	6	6
(Australia) Fay Muller	0	0
2	(United Kingdom) Christine Truman	6	6

Semifinals
7	(Australia) Margaret Smith	7	2	6
4	(Australia) Mary Carter Reitano	5	6	2
3	(Australia) Jan Lehane	7	3	7
2	(United Kingdom) Christine Truman	5	6	5

Finals
7	(Australia) Margaret Smith	7	6
3	(Australia) Jan Lehane	5	2

=== Earlier rounds ===
==== Section 1 ====
First round
1	(Brazil) Bueno	6	6
(Australia) Craig	2	1
(Australia) Robberds	4	6	6
(Australia) Thiele	6	1	2
7	(Australia) Smith	6	6
(Australia) Linde	1	0
(Australia) Shearer	6	3	6
(Australia) Ebbern	3	6	2
4	(Australia) Carter Reitano	6	6
(Australia) Duff	2	1
(Australia) Schacht	6	6
(Australia) Nitschke	0	0
6	(Australia) Rae	6	6
(Australia) Harris	2	3
(Australia) Bevis Hawton	6	6
(Australia) Gray	1	2

Second round
1	(Brazil) Bueno	6	6
(Australia) Robberds	1	0
7	(Australia) Smith	6	6
(Australia) Shearer	3	2
4	(Australia) Carter Reitano	9	6
(Australia) Schacht	7	4
6	(Australia) Rae	2	1
(Australia) Bevis Hawton	6	6

Quarterfinals
1	(Brazil) Bueno	5	6	4
7	(Australia) Smith	7	3	6
4	(Australia) Carter Reitano	6	8
(Australia) Bevis Hawton	2	6

Semifinals
7	(Australia) Smith	7	2	6
4	(Australia) Carter Reitano	5	6	2

==== Section 2 ====
First round
(Australia) Turner
(Australia) Lee	w/o
5	(Australia) Coghlan	6	6
(Australia) Whitely	2	2
(Australia) Blackman	3	6	6
(Australia) Hall Hopman	6	2	0
3	(Australia) Lehane	6	6
(Australia) McLean	1	1
(Australia) Muller	6	6
(Australia) Astley	0	1
8	(Australia) Holstein	6	6
(Australia) White	0	1
(Australia) Turner	6	6
(Australia) Shipton	1	0
2	(United Kingdom) Truman	6	6
(Australia) Wicks	0	3

Second round
(Australia) Turner	2	3
5	(Australia) Coghlan	6	6
(Australia) Blackman	2	0
3	(Australia) Lehane	6	6
(Australia) Muller	6	6
8	(Australia) Holstein	1	4
(Australia) Turner	6	1	2
2	(United Kingdom) Truman	3	6	6

Quarterfinals
5	(Australia) Coghlan	1	1
3	(Australia) Lehane	6	6
(Australia) Muller	0	0
2	(United Kingdom) Truman	6	6

Semifinals
3	(Australia) Lehane	7	3	7
2	(United Kingdom) Truman	5	6	5

Preceded by 1959 U.S. National Championships – Women's singles	Grand Slam women's singles	Succeeded by 1960 French Championships – Women's singles
