= 1959 Australian Championships =

- Date: 16-26 January 1959
- Edition: 47th
- Category: Grand Slam (ITF)
- Surface: Grass
- Location: Adelaide, Australia
- Venue: Memorial Drive

Champions

Men's singles
- (United States) Alex Olmedo

Women's singles
- (Australia) Mary Carter Reitano

Men's doubles
- (Australia) Rod Laver / (Australia) Bob Mark

Women's doubles
- (South Africa) Sandra Reynolds / (South Africa) Renée Schuurman

Mixed doubles
- (South Africa) Sandra Reynolds / (Australia) Bob Mark
- Australian Championships

The 1959 Australian Championships was a tennis tournament that took place on outdoor Grass courts at the Memorial Drive, Adelaide, Australia from 16 January to 26 January. It was the 47th edition of the Australian Championships (now known as the Australian Open), the 12th held in Adelaide, and the first Grand Slam tournament of the year.

== Champions ==
=== Men's singles ===
(United States) Alex Olmedo defeated (Australia) Neale Fraser 6–1, 6–2, 3–6, 6–3

=== Women's singles ===
(Australia) Mary Carter Reitano defeated (South Africa) Renee Schuurman 6–2, 6–3

=== Men's doubles ===
(Australia) Rod Laver / (Australia) Robert Mark defeated (Australia) Don Candy / (Australia) Bob Howe 9–7, 6–4, 6–2

=== Women's doubles ===
(South Africa) Sandra Reynolds / (South Africa) Renée Schuurman defeated (Australia) Lorraine Coghlan / (Australia) Mary Reitano 7–5, 6–4

=== Mixed doubles ===
(South Africa) Sandra Reynolds / (Australia) Bob Mark defeated (South Africa) Renée Schuurman / (Australia) Rod Laver 4–6, 13–11, 6–1

| Preceded by 1958 U.S. National Championships | Grand Slams | Succeeded by 1959 French Championships |
