= Robberds =

Robberds is a surname. Notable people with the surname include:

- Dawn Robberds, Australian tennis player
- John Gooch Robberds (1789–1854), English Unitarian minister
- Lionel Robberds (1939-2024), Australian coxswain, squash player, and barrister
- Walter Robberds (1863-1944), Anglican bishop
