= Jan Lehane =

Australian tennis player

- Full name: Janice Patricia Lehane-O'Neill
- ITF name: Jan O'Neill
- Country (sports): Australia
- Born: 9 July 1941 (age 85) Grenfell, New South Wales, Australia
- Turned pro: 1969 (1956 amateur)
- Retired: 1977
- Plays: Right-handed (double-handed backhand)

Singles
- Highest ranking: No. 7 (1963)

Grand Slam singles results
- Australian Open: F (1960, 1961, 1962, 1963)
- French Open: QF (1960, 1962, 1963, 1964)
- Wimbledon: QF (1963)
- US Open: QF (1960, 1961)

Grand Slam doubles results
- Australian Open: F (1961, 1963)
- French Open: SF (1960, 1961, 1962)
- Wimbledon: F (1961)

Grand Slam mixed doubles results
- Australian Open: W (1960, 1961)
- French Open: SF (1961)
- Wimbledon: 4R (1960, 1962)

Team competitions
- Fed Cup: F (1963)

Janice Patricia "Jan" Lehane O'Neill OAM (née Lehane; born 9 July 1941) is a former Australian female tennis player. She was the first leading female player with a double-handed backhand.

She won the singles title at the New South Wales Championships in 1959 after a three-sets victory in the final against Mary Carter Reitano. In 1960, she successfully defended her title by winning the semifinal against world No. 1 ranked Maria Bueno and the final in straight sets against Margaret Smith.

At the Australian Championships, Lehane reached the singles final four consecutive years (1960–1963) but lost to Margaret Smith each time. She had a similar experience in women's doubles, reaching the final twice (in 1961 with Mary Bevis Hawton and 1963 with Lesley Turner Bowrey) but losing each time to a team that included Smith (with Mary Carter Reitano in 1961 and Robyn Ebbern in 1963). Lehane had more success in the mixed doubles, twice winning the title (in 1960 with Trevor Fancutt and 1961 with Bob Hewitt). However, Mike Sangster and Lehane lost the 1964 mixed doubles final to Smith and Ken Fletcher.

She had an operation on her right knee in January 1965 and did not play any of the Grand Slams that year.

She was part of the Australian Fed Cup team that reached the final in 1963 and won all three of her singles rubbers.

According to Lance Tingay of The Daily Telegraph and the Daily Mail, O'Neill was ranked in the world top 10 in 1960, 1963, and 1964, reaching a career high of World No. 7 in 1963.

Lehane married James John O'Neill on 19 February 1966.

In 2018, she was inducted into the Australian Tennis Hall of Fame.

On Australia Day 2019, Jan was awarded the Medal of the Order of Australia (OAM) for her service to tennis.

== Grand Slam finals ==
=== Singles (4 runners-up) ===
Result	Year	Championship	Surface	Opponent	Score
Loss	1960	Australian Championships	Grass	(Australia) Margaret Smith	5–7, 2–6
Loss	1961	Australian Championships	Grass	(Australia) Margaret Smith	1–6, 4–6
Loss	1962	Australian Championships	Grass	(Australia) Margaret Smith	0–6, 2–6
Loss	1963	Australian Championships	Grass	(Australia) Margaret Smith	2–6, 2–6

=== Doubles: (3 runners-up) ===
Result	Year	Championship	Surface	Partner	Opponent	Score
Loss	1961	Australian Championships	Grass	(Australia) Mary Hawton	(Australia) Mary Carter Reitano (Australia) Margaret Smith	4–6, 6–3, 5–7
Loss	1961	Wimbledon	Grass	(Australia) Margaret Smith	(United States) Karen Hantze Susman (United States) Billie Jean Moffitt	3–6, 4–6
Loss	1963	Australian Championships	Grass	(Australia) Lesley Turner	(Australia) Robyn Ebbern (Australia) Margaret Smith	1–6, 3–6

=== Mixed doubles (2 titles, 1 runner-up) ===
Result	Year	Championship	Surface	Partner	Opponent	Score
Win	1960	Australian Championships	Grass	(South Africa) Trevor Fancutt	(United Kingdom) Christine Truman (Australia) Martin Mulligan	6–2, 7–5
Win	1961	Australian Championships	Grass	(Australia) Bob Hewitt	(Australia) Mary Carter Reitano (Australia) John Pearce	9–7, 6–2
Loss	1964	Australian Championships	Grass	(United Kingdom) Mike Sangster	(Australia) Margaret Smith (Australia) Ken Fletcher	2–6, 3–6

== Grand Slam singles tournament timeline ==
Key
W	F	SF	QF	#R	RR	Q#	DNQ	A	NH

(W) winner; (F) finalist; (SF) semifinalist; (QF) quarterfinalist; (#R) rounds 4, 3, 2, 1; (RR) round-robin stage; (Q#) qualification round; (DNQ) did not qualify; (A) absent; (NH) not held; (SR) strike rate (events won / competed); (W–L) win–loss record.

Tournament	1958	1959	1960	1961	1962	1963	1964	1965	1966	1967	1968	1969	1970	1971	1972	1973	1974	1975	1976	1977	Career SR
Australia	1R	SF	F	F	F	F	SF	A	2R	3R	A	A	3R	QF	A	A	2R	A	A	2R / A	0 / 13
France	A	A	QF	4R	QF	QF	QF	A	A	3R	A	A	A	A	A	A	A	A	A	A	0 / 6
Wimbledon	A	A	1R	4R	3R	QF	3R	A	A	4R	A	A	A	A	A	A	A	A	A	A	0 / 5
United States	A	A	QF	QF	3R	A	A	A	A	A	A	A	A	A	A	A	A	A	A	A	0 / 3
SR	0 / 1	0 / 1	0 / 4	0 / 4	0 / 4	0 / 3	0 / 2	0 / 0	0 / 1	0 / 3	0 / 0	0 / 0	0 / 1	0 / 1	0 / 0	0 / 0	0 / 1	0 / 0	0 / 0	0 / 1	0 / 27

Note: The Australian Open was held twice in 1977, in January and December. O'Neill participated only in the January edition.

== See also ==
- Performance timelines for all female tennis players since 1978 who reached at least one Grand Slam final
