= 1960 Wightman Cup =

International women's tennis competition

Details
- Edition: 32nd

Champion
- Winning nation: Great Britain

The 1960 Wightman Cup was the 32nd edition of the annual women's team tennis competition between the United States and Great Britain. It was held at the All England Lawn Tennis and Croquet Club in London in England in the United Kingdom.

Great Britain
4
All England Lawn Tennis and Croquet Club, London, England, United Kingdom
1960
Grass

United States
3

			1	2	3
1	(United Kingdom) (United States)	Ann Haydon; Karen Hantze	2; 6	11; 9	6; 1
2	(United Kingdom) (United States)	Christine Truman; Darlene Hard	6; 4	3; 6	4; 6
3	(United Kingdom) (United States)	Ann Haydon; Darlene Hard	7; 5	2; 6	1; 6
4	(United Kingdom) (United States)	Christine Truman; Karen Hantze	7; 5	6; 3
5	(United Kingdom) (United States)	Angela Mortimer; Janet Hopps	6; 8	6; 4	6; 1
6	(United Kingdom) (United States)	Ann Haydon / Angela Mortimer; Darlene Hard / Karen Hantze	0; 6	0; 6
7	(United Kingdom) (United States)	Shirley Brasher / Christine Truman; Janet Hopps / Dorothy Head Knode	6; 4	9; 7
