= Maureen Pratt =

Australian tennis player

- Full name: Maureen McCalman Pratt
- Country (sports): Australia
- Plays: Right-handed

Singles

Grand Slam singles results
- Australian Open: 3R (1961)

Doubles

Grand Slam doubles results
- Australian Open: QF (1956, 1958, 1961)

Maureen Pratt is an Australian former professional tennis player.

Pratt, a Victorian junior champion, was ranked amongst the top 10 players in the country at stages of her career and made the singles third round at the 1961 Australian Championships. She originally competed under her maiden name Maureen McCalman and has a daughter, Kerryn Pratt, who played on the professional tour.
