= 1960 U.S. National Championships – Women's singles =

Women's singles
- 1960 U.S. National Championships

Final
- Champion: (United States) Darlene Hard
- Runner-up: (Brazil) Maria Bueno
- Score: 6–4, 10–12, 6–4

Details
- Draw: 64
- Seeds: 8

Events
Singles	men	women
Doubles	men	women
- U.S. National Championships

Fourth-seeded Darlene Hard defeated first-seeded Maria Bueno 6–4, 10–12, 6–4 in the final to win the women's singles tennis title at the 1960 U.S. National Championships. The tournament was played on outdoor grass courts and held from September 2 through September 17, 1960 at the West Side Tennis Club in Forest Hills, Queens, New York.

The draw consisted of 64 players of which eight were seeded.

== Seeds ==
The seeded players are listed below. Darlene Hard is the champion; others show in brackets the round in which they were eliminated.

1. (Brazil) Maria Bueno (finalist)
2. (United States) Ann Haydon (quarterfinals)
3. (United Kingdom) Christine Truman (semifinals)
4. (United States) Darlene Hard (champion)
5. (United States) Karen Hantze (third round)
6. (Australia) Jan Lehane (quarterfinals)
7. (South Africa) Bernice Vukovich (quarterfinals)
8. (United States) Nancy Richey (quarterfinals)

== Draw ==
=== Key ===
- Q = Qualifier
- WC = Wild card
- LL = Lucky loser
- r = Retired

=== Final eight ===
Quarterfinals
1	(Brazil) Maria Bueno	6	6
8	(United States) Nancy Richey	2	4
3	(United Kingdom) Christine Truman	6	6
7	(South Africa) Bernice Vukovich	3	3
2	(United Kingdom) Ann Haydon	6	2	7
(United States) Donna Floyd	3	6	9
4	(United States) Darlene Hard	6	6
6	(Australia) Jan Lehane	2	1

Semifinals
1	(Brazil) Maria Bueno	6	9
3	(United Kingdom) Christine Truman	3	7
(United States) Donna Floyd	1	5
4	(United States) Darlene Hard	6	7

Finals
1	(Brazil) Maria Bueno	4	12	4
4	(United States) Darlene Hard	6	10	6

Preceded by 1960 Wimbledon Championships – Women's singles	Grand Slam women's singles	Succeeded by 1961 Australian Championships – Women's singles
