= 1959 Australian Championships – Women's singles =

Women's singles
- 1959 Australian Championships

Final
- Champion: (Australia) Mary Reitano
- Runner-up: (South Africa) Renée Schuurman
- Score: 6–2, 6–3

Details
- Draw: 32
- Seeds: 8

Events
Singles	men	women
Doubles	men	women
- Australian Championships

Fourth-seeded Mary Reitano defeated Renée Schuurman 6–2, 6–3 in the final to win the women's singles tennis title at the 1959 Australian Championships.

== Seeds ==
The seeded players are listed below. Mary Reitano is the champion; others show the round in which they were eliminated.

1. (South Africa) Sandra Reynolds (quarterfinals)
2. (South Africa) Renée Schuurman (finalist)
3. (Australia) Lorraine Coghlan (quarterfinals)
4. (Australia) Mary Reitano (champion)
5. (Australia) Jan Lehane (semifinals)
6. (Australia) Mary Hawton (semifinals)
7. (Australia) Thelma Long (first round)
8. (Australia) Betty Holstein (second round)

== Draw ==
=== Key ===
- Q = Qualifier
- WC = Wild card
- LL = Lucky loser
- r = Retired

=== Finals ===
Quarterfinals
1	(South Africa) Sandra Reynolds	3	4
5	(Australia) Jan Lehane	6	6
4	(Australia) Mary Reitano	8	6
(Australia) Beverley Rae	6	4
6	(Australia) Mary Hawton	6	4	6
3	(Australia) Lorraine Coghlan	4	6	0
(Australia) Lesley Turner	2	0
2	(South Africa) Renée Schuurman	6	6

Semifinals
5	(Australia) Jan Lehane	3	0
4	(Australia) Mary Reitano	6	6
6	(Australia) Mary Hawton	3	0
2	(South Africa) Renée Schuurman	6	6

Finals
4	(Australia) Mary Reitano	6	6
2	(South Africa) Renée Schuurman	2	3

=== Earlier rounds ===
==== Section 1 ====
First round
1	(South Africa) S Reynolds	6	6
(Australia) R Lesh	1	3
(Australia) J Shearer	7	6
(Australia) K Newcombe	5	1
5	(Australia) J Lehane	6	6
(Australia) E Court	3	0
(Australia) G Thiele	6	6
(Australia) L Bowden	3	1
4	(Australia) M Reitano	7	6
(Australia) J O'Brien	5	0
(Australia) M Smith	6	6
(Australia) C Astley	1	1
8	(Australia) B Holstein	6	4	6
(Australia) F Grant	2	6	1
(Australia) B Rae	6	6
(Australia) Miller	3	1

Second round
1	(South Africa) S Reynolds	6	6
(Australia) J Shearer	2	2
5	(Australia) J Lehane	6	6
(Australia) G Thiele	1	1
4	(Australia) M Reitano	6	7
(Australia) M Smith	4	5
8	(Australia) B Holstein	6	1	3
(Australia) B Rae	3	6	6

Quarterfinals
1	(South Africa) S Reynolds	3	4
5	(Australia) J Lehane	6	6
4	(Australia) M Reitano	8	6
(Australia) B Rae	6	4

Semifinals
5	(Australia) J Lehane	3	0
4	(Australia) M Reitano	6	6

==== Section 2 ====
First round
(Australia) N Hopman	8	6
(Australia) Y Johnson	6	3
6	(Australia) M Hawton	6	6
(Australia) Marie Burke	2	1
(Australia) D Robberds	6	6
(Australia) K Le Mercier	2	1
3	(Australia) L Coghlan	6	6
(Australia) B Tyson	1	0
(Australia) L Turner	6	6
(Australia) J Nitschke	0	0
(Australia) E Duldig	6	6
7	(Australia) T Long	3	4
(Australia) J Gray	2	6	6
(Australia) J Tegart	6	3	1
2	(South Africa) R Schuurman	6	6
(Australia) M Ferguson	0	2

Second round
(Australia) N Hopman	0	0
6	(Australia) M Hawton	6	6
(Australia) D Robberds	3	1
3	(Australia) L Coghlan	6	6
(Australia) L Turner	6	8
(Australia) E Duldig	2	6
(Australia) J Gray	1	3
2	(South Africa) R Schuurman	6	6

Quarterfinals
6	(Australia) M Hawton	6	4	6
3	(Australia) L Coghlan	4	6	0
(Australia) L Turner	2	0
2	(South Africa) R Schuurman	6	6

Semifinals
6	(Australia) M Hawton	3	0
2	(South Africa) R Schuurman	6	6

Preceded by 1958 U.S. National Championships – Women's singles	Grand Slam women's singles	Succeeded by 1959 French Championships – Women's singles
