= 1959 U.S. National Championships – Women's singles =

Women's singles
- 1959 U.S. National Championships

Final
- Champion: (Brazil) Maria Bueno
- Runner-up: (United Kingdom) Christine Truman
- Score: 6–1, 6–4

Details
- Draw: 64
- Seeds: 8

Events
Singles	men	women
Doubles	men	women
- U.S. National Championships

First-seeded Maria Bueno defeated Christine Truman 6–1, 6–4 in the final to win the women's singles tennis title at the 1959 U.S. National Championships.

This was notably the first grand slam that former world number 1 and 12 time grand slam champion Billie Jean King competed in.

== Seeds ==
The seeded players are listed below. Maria Bueno is the champion; others show in brackets the round in which they were eliminated.

1. (Brazil) Maria Bueno (champion)
2. (South Africa) Sandra Reynolds (quarterfinals)
3. (United Kingdom) Christine Truman (finalist)
4. (United States) Darlene Hard (semifinals)
5. (United Kingdom) Angela Mortimer (second round)
6. (United Kingdom) Ann Haydon (semifinals)
7. (South Africa) Renée Schuurman (second round)
8. (United States) Sally Moore (third round)

== Draw ==
=== Key ===
- Q = Qualifier
- WC = Wild card
- LL = Lucky loser
- r = Retired

=== Final eight ===
Quarterfinals
2	(South Africa) Sandra Reynolds	3	2
6	(United Kingdom) Ann Haydon	6	6
3	(United Kingdom) Christine Truman	6	6
(United States) Dorothy Knode	1	2
1	(Brazil) Maria Bueno	6	6
(United States) Louise Brough Clapp	3	2
4	(United States) Darlene Hard	5	9	6
(United States) Karen Hantze	7	7	3

Semifinals
6	(United Kingdom) Ann Haydon	2	3
3	(United Kingdom) Christine Truman	6	6
1	(Brazil) Maria Bueno	6	6
4	(United States) Darlene Hard	2	4

Finals
3	(United Kingdom) Christine Truman	1	4
1	(Brazil) Maria Bueno	6	6

Preceded by 1959 Wimbledon Championships – Women's singles	Grand Slam women's singles	Succeeded by 1960 Australian Championships – Women's singles
