= 1960 French Championships – Women's singles =

Women's singles
- 1960 French Championships

Final
- Champion: (United States) Darlene Hard
- Runner-up: (Mexico) Yola Ramírez
- Score: 6–3, 6–4

Details
- Seeds: 16

Events
Singles	men	women
Doubles	men	women
- French Championships

Sixth-seeded Darlene Hard defeated Yola Ramírez 6–3, 6–4 in the final to win the women's singles tennis title at the 1960 French Championships.

== Seeds ==
The seeded players are listed below. Darlene Hard is the champion; others show the round in which they were eliminated.

1. (Hungary) Zsuzsi Körmöczy (second round)
2. (Brazil) Maria Bueno (semifinals)
3. (France) Florence De La Courtie (third round)
4. (United Kingdom) Ann Haydon (third round)
5. (South Africa) Sandra Reynolds (semifinals)
6. (United States) Darlene Hard (champion)
7. (Australia) Jan Lehane (quarterfinals)
8. (Mexico) Yola Ramírez (finalist)
9. (West Germany) Edda Buding (third round)
10. (South Africa) Bernice Vukovich (third round)
11. (Italy) Silvana Lazzarino (third round)
12. (Italy) Lea Pericoli (third round)
13. (Czechoslovakia) Vera Puzejova (quarterfinals)
14. (South Africa) Renée Schuurman (quarterfinals)
15. (Belgium) Christiane Mercelis (third round)
16. (Australia) Mary Hawton (third round)

== Draw ==
=== Key ===
- Q = Qualifier
- WC = Wild card
- LL = Lucky loser
- r = Retired

=== Finals ===
Quarterfinals
(Egypt) Betsy Abbas	0	4
8	(Mexico) Yola Ramírez	6	6
13	(Czechoslovakia) Vera Puzejova	5	2
5	(South Africa) Sandra Reynolds	7	6
6	(United States) Darlene Hard	5	6	11
14	(South Africa) Renée Schuurman	7	2	9
7	(Australia) Jan Lehane	1	6	3
2	(Brazil) Maria Bueno	6	2	6

Semifinals
8	(Mexico) Yola Ramírez	8	6	6
5	(South Africa) Sandra Reynolds	10	3	3
6	(United States) Darlene Hard	6	6
2	(Brazil) Maria Bueno	3	2

Finals
8	(Mexico) Yola Ramírez	3	4
6	(United States) Darlene Hard	6	6

=== Earlier rounds ===
==== Section 1 ====
First round
1	(Hungary) Körmöczy
(Canada) Sladek
(Italy) Bassi	2	6	7
(Egypt) Abbas	6	2	9
16	(Australia) Hawton	6	6
(France) De Lansalut	2	2
(United Kingdom) Hales	3	3
(United States) Arnold	6	6
8	(Mexico) Ramírez	6	6
(France) Bonniard	1	2
(France) Seghers	6	2
(South Africa) Segal	8	6
9	(West Germany) Buding
(United States) Thomas
(France) Trancart	2	4
(Australia) Langley	6	6

Second round
1	(Hungary) Körmöczy	5	r
(Egypt) Abbas	4
16	(Australia) Hawton	6	6
(United States) Arnold	4	2
8	(Mexico) Ramírez	6	6
(South Africa) Segal	4	3
9	(West Germany) Buding	6	6
(Australia) Langley	1	2

Third round
(Egypt) Abbas
16	(Australia) Hawton
8	(Mexico) Ramírez	6	6
9	(West Germany) Buding	2	3

Quarterfinals
(Egypt) Abbas	6	6
8	(Mexico) Ramírez	0	4

==== Section 2 ====
First round
4	(United Kingdom) Haydon	6	6
(France) Dusapt	2	1
(France) Bouchet
(Socialist Federal Republic of Yugoslavia) Djukic
13	(Czechoslovakia) Puzejova	6	6
(France) Repoux	2	2
(Australia) O'Brien	0	2
(France) Nenot	6	6
5	(South Africa) Reynolds	6	6
(France) Wild	4	1
(United States) Wright
(France) Siarry
12	(Italy) Pericoli	6	6
(France) Courteix	4	2
(United States) Stewart	3	6	1
(France) Dürr	6	4	6

Second round
4	(United Kingdom) Haydon	6	6
(France) Bouchet	0	0
13	(Czechoslovakia) Puzejova	8	6
(France) Nenot	6	1
5	(South Africa) Reynolds	6	6
(France) Siarry	4	2
12	(Italy) Pericoli	6	6
(France) Dürr	1	3

Third round
4	(United Kingdom) Haydon	6	3	6
13	(Czechoslovakia) Puzejova	4	6	8
5	(South Africa) Reynolds	6	6
12	(Italy) Pericoli	1	2

Quarterfinals
13	(Czechoslovakia) Puzejova	7	6
5	(South Africa) Reynolds	5	2

==== Section 3 ====
First round
(France) Salvet	7	1
(France) Morales	9	6
(West Germany) Ostermann	1	4
11	(Italy) Lazzarino	6	6
(France) Billaz	7	4
(Chile) Tort De Ayala	9	6
(France) Berson	7	2	2
6	(United States) Hard	5	6	6
(France) Rees-Lewis
(United Kingdom) Bentley	w/o
(France) Seghers	4	2
14	(South Africa) Schuurman	6	6
(New Zealand) Morrison
(France) Galtier
(Australia) Hellyer	1	1
3	(France) De La Courtie	6	6

Second round
(France) Morales	6	1	3
11	(Italy) Lazzarino	4	6	6
(Chile) Tort De Ayala	5	4
6	(United States) Hard	7	6
(France) Rees-Lewis	0	0
14	(South Africa) Schuurman	6	6
(France) Galtier	2	3
3	(France) De La Courtie	6	6

Third round
11	(Italy) Lazzarino	4	6	5^{r}
6	(United States) Hard	6	3	4
14	(South Africa) Schuurman	3	6	6
3	(France) De La Courtie	6	1	3

Quarterfinals
6	(United States) Hard	5	6	11
14	(South Africa) Schuurman	7	2	9

==== Section 4 ====
First round
(France) Lemal
(Mexico) Reyes
(Spain) Barril
10	(South Africa) Vukovich
(United States) Kunnen
(Soviet Union) Kuzmenko
(France) Kermina	0	1
7	(Australia) Lehane	6	6
(Australia) Gibson
(France) Varin
(France) Bourbonnais	2	1
15	(Belgium) Mercelis	6	6
(France) Le Besnerais
(Italy) Bossi
(France) Lombard	2	2
2	(Brazil) Bueno	6	6

Second round
(France) Lemal	1	1
10	(South Africa) Vukovich	6	6
(Soviet Union) Kuzmenko	0	0
7	(Australia) Lehane	6	6
(France) Varin	2	4
15	(Belgium) Mercelis	6	6
(France) Le Besnerais	5	6	2
2	(Brazil) Bueno	7	2	6

Third round
10	(South Africa) Vukovich	2	5
7	(Australia) Lehane	6	7
15	(Belgium) Mercelis	6	2
2	(Brazil) Bueno	8	6

Quarterfinals
7	(Australia) Lehane	1	6	3
2	(Brazil) Bueno	6	2	6

Preceded by 1960 Australian Championships – Women's singles	Grand Slam women's singles	Succeeded by 1960 Wimbledon Championships – Women's singles
