= 1962 U.S. National Championships – Women's singles =

Women's singles
- 1962 U.S. National Championships

Final
- Champion: (Australia) Margaret Smith
- Runner-up: (United States) Darlene Hard
- Score: 9–7, 6–4

Details
- Draw: 96
- Seeds: 8

Events
Singles	men	women
Doubles	men	women
- U.S. National Championships

First-seeded Margaret Smith defeated fifth-seeded Darlene Hard 9–7, 6–4 in the final to win the women's singles tennis title at the 1962 U.S. National Championships. The tournament was played on outdoor grass courts and held from August 29 through September 10, 1962 at the West Side Tennis Club in Forest Hills, Queens, New York.

The draw consisted of 96 players of which eight were seeded.

== Seeds ==
The seeded players are listed below. Margaret Smith is the champion; others show in brackets the round in which they were eliminated.

1. (Australia) Margaret Smith (champion)
2. (United States) Karen Hantze Susman (third round)
3. (Brazil) Maria Bueno (semifinals)
4. (Czechoslovakia) Věra Suková (quarterfinals)
5. (United States) Darlene Hard (finalist)
6. (South Africa) Renée Schuurman (third round)
7. (Australia) Lesley Turner (fourth round)
8. (South Africa) Sandra Reynolds Price (quarterfinals)

== Draw ==
=== Key ===
- Q = Qualifier
- WC = Wild card
- LL = Lucky loser
- r = Retired

=== Final eight ===
Quarterfinals
1	(Australia) Margaret Smith	6	6
8	(South Africa) Sandra Reynolds Price	3	3
3	(Brazil) Maria Bueno	6	6
(United States) Donna Floyd	1	3
(United States) Victoria Palmer	6	6
(United States) Gwyneth Thomas	4	3
4	(Czechoslovakia) Věra Suková	2	1
5	(United States) Darlene Hard	6	6

Semifinals
1	(Australia) Margaret Smith	6	6	6
3	(Brazil) Maria Bueno	8	3	4
(United States) Victoria Palmer	2	3
5	(United States) Darlene Hard	6	6

Finals
1	(Australia) Margaret Smith	9	6
5	(United States) Darlene Hard	7	4

Preceded by 1962 Wimbledon Championships – Women's singles	Grand Slam women's singles	Succeeded by 1963 Australian Championships – Women's singles
