= Lorraine Coghlan =

Australian tennis player

- Full name: Lorraine Coghlan Robinson
- Country (sports): Australia
- Residence: Victoria, Australia
- Born: 23 September 1937 (age 88) Victoria, Australia

Singles

Grand Slam singles results
- Australian Open: F (1958)
- French Open: 4R (1958)
- Wimbledon: 4R (1958)
- US Open: 2R (1958)

Doubles

Grand Slam doubles results
- Australian Open: F (1958, 1959, 1960, 1967)

Grand Slam mixed doubles results
- French Open: F (1958)
- Wimbledon: W (1958)

Lorraine Coghlan Robinson (née Coghlan; born 23 September 1937) is a former tennis player from the state of Victoria in Australia. In 1956, she won the Australian Championships Girls' Singles title. Coghlan teamed with Bob Howe to win the mixed doubles title at Wimbledon in 1958. Coghlan and Howe were also the runners-up in mixed doubles at the 1958 French Championships.

At the Australian Championships, Coghlan was the singles runner-up in 1958, losing to Angela Mortimer 6–3, 6–4, and was a runner-up in women's doubles in 1958, 1959, 1960, and 1967.

Coghlan married John Robinson on 19 December 1959.

== Grand Slam finals ==
=== Doubles (4 runner-ups) ===
Result	Year	Championship	Surface	Partner	Opponents	Score
Loss	1958	Australian Championships	Grass	(United Kingdom) Angela Mortimer	(Australia) Mary Bevis Hawton (Australia) Thelma Coyne Long	5–7, 8–6, 2–6
Loss	1959	Australian Championships	Grass	(Australia) Mary Carter Reitano	(South Africa) Renée Schuurman (South Africa) Sandra Reynolds	5–7, 4–6
Loss	1960	Australian Championships	Grass	(Australia) Margaret Smith	(Brazil) Maria Bueno (United Kingdom) Christine Truman	2–6, 7–5, 2–6
Loss	1967	Australian Championships	Grass	(France) Évelyne Terras	(Australia) Lesley Turner Bowrey (Australia) Judy Tegart	0–6, 2–6

=== Mixed doubles (1 title, 1 runner-up) ===
Result	Year	Championship	Surface	Partner	Opponents	Score
Loss	1958	French Championships	Clay	(Australia) Bob Howe	(United Kingdom) Shirley Bloomer (Italy) Nicola Pietrangeli	6–8, 2–6
Win	1958	Wimbledon	Grass	(Australia) Bob Howe	(United States) Althea Gibson (Denmark) Kurt Nielsen	6–3, 13–11

== Grand Slam singles tournament timeline ==
Key
W	F	SF	QF	#R	RR	Q#	DNQ	A	NH

(W) winner; (F) finalist; (SF) semifinalist; (QF) quarterfinalist; (#R) rounds 4, 3, 2, 1; (RR) round-robin stage; (Q#) qualification round; (DNQ) did not qualify; (A) absent; (NH) not held; (SR) strike rate (events won / competed); (W–L) win–loss record.

Tournament	1955	1956	1957	1958	1959	1960	1961	1962	1963–1966	1967	1968	1969	1970	1971	Career SR
Australia	2R	QF	SF	F	QF	QF	A	2R	A	QF	1R	A	A	A	0 / 9
France	A	A	A	4R	A	A	A	A	A	A	A	A	A	A	0 / 1
Wimbledon	A	A	A	4R	A	A	A	A	A	A	A	A	A	1R	0 / 2
United States	A	A	A	2R	A	A	A	A	A	A	A	A	A	A	0 / 1
SR	0 / 1	0 / 1	0 / 1	0 / 4	0 / 1	0 / 1	0 / 0	0 / 1	0 / 0	0 / 1	0 / 1	0 / 0	0 / 0	0 / 1	0 / 13

== See also ==
- Performance timelines for all female tennis players since 1978 who reached at least one Grand Slam final
