= 1959 French Championships – Women's singles =

Women's singles
- 1959 French Championships

Final
- Champion: (United Kingdom) Christine Truman
- Runner-up: (Hungary) Zsuzsi Körmöczy
- Score: 6–4, 7–5

Details
- Seeds: 16

Events
Singles	men	women
Doubles	men	women
← 1958 ·	French Championships	· 1960 →

Second-seeded Christine Truman defeated Zsuzsi Körmöczy 6–4, 7–5 in the final to win the women's singles tennis title at the 1959 French Championships.

== Seeds ==
The seeded players are listed below. Christine Truman is the champion; others show the round in which they were eliminated.

1. (Hungary) Zsuzsi Körmöczy (finalist)
2. (United Kingdom) Christine Truman (champion)
3. (Brazil) Maria Bueno (quarterfinals)
4. (United Kingdom) Shirley Brasher (third round)
5. (Australia) Mary Reitano (quarterfinals)
6. (South Africa) Sandra Reynolds (semifinals)
7. (United States) Jeanne Marie Arth (second round)
8. (Mexico) Yola Ramírez (third round)
9. (Czechoslovakia) Vera Puzejova (quarterfinals)
10. (Belgium) Christiane Mercelis (second round)
11. (United States) Janet Hopps (third round)
12. (France) Florence De La Courtie (third round)
13. (Mexico) Rosie Reyes (semifinals)
14. (Italy) Silvana Lazzarino (third round)
15. (South Africa) Renée Schuurman (second round)
16. (United States) Mimi Arnold (third round)

== Draw ==
=== Key ===
- Q = Qualifier
- WC = Wild card
- LL = Lucky loser
- r = Retired

=== Finals ===
Quarterfinals
1	(Hungary) Zsuzsi Körmöczy	6	6
9	(Czechoslovakia) Vera Puzejova	3	4
13	(Mexico) Rosie Reyes	4	6	6
5	(Australia) Mary Reitano	6	1	4
6	(South Africa) Sandra Reynolds	2	6	6
3	(Brazil) Maria Bueno	6	4	2
(France) Paule Courteix	1	6
2	(United Kingdom) Christine Truman	6	8

Semifinals
1	(Hungary) Zsuzsi Körmöczy	6	6
13	(Mexico) Rosie Reyes	3	0
6	(South Africa) Sandra Reynolds	6	6	2
2	(United Kingdom) Christine Truman	4	8	6

Finals
1	(Hungary) Zsuzsi Körmöczy	4	5
2	(United Kingdom) Christine Truman	6	7

=== Earlier rounds ===
==== Section 1 ====
First round
1	(Hungary) Körmöczy	6	6
(United Kingdom) Bentley	2	2
(France) Trancart	2	4
(France) Bucaille	6	6
16	(United States) Arnold
(Poland) Jędrzejowska	w/o
(France) Lucot	3	3
(France) Varin	6	6
8	(Mexico) Ramírez	6	6
(Argentina) Weiss	2	0
Laurence	2	0
(Hungary) Peterdy	6	6
(United States) Vail	2	0
9	(Czechoslovakia) Puzejova	6	6
(West Germany) Buding
(France) Amouretti

Second round
1	(Hungary) Körmöczy	6	6
(France) Bucaille	2	1
16	(United States) Arnold	6	6
(France) Varin	2	2
8	(Mexico) Ramírez	6	6
(Hungary) Peterdy	0	2
9	(Czechoslovakia) Puzejova	6	6
(France) Amouretti	1	2

Third round
1	(Hungary) Körmöczy	6	6
16	(United States) Arnold	3	0
8	(Mexico) Ramírez	6	6	1
9	(Czechoslovakia) Puzejova	1	8	6

Quarterfinals
1	(Hungary) Körmöczy	6	6
9	(Czechoslovakia) Puzejova	3	4

==== Section 2 ====
First round
4	(United Kingdom) Brasher	6	6
(France) Trauttmann	1	2
(France) Billaz	1	5
(South Africa) Cross	6	7
13	(Mexico) Reyes	5	6	6
(New Zealand) Morrison	7	3	3
(France) Siarry	3	5
(Spain) Barril	6	7
5	(Australia) Reitano	6	6
(Netherlands) Rouwenhorst-Tekelenburg	1	2
(France) Bourbonnais	3	1
(West Germany) Buding	6	6
(France) Coste	4	8	1
12	(France) De La Courtie	6	6	6
(United States) Fageros	4	1
(Hungary) Brosszmann	6	6

Second round
4	(United Kingdom) Brasher	6	6
(South Africa) Cross	0	1
13	(Mexico) Reyes	6	4	6
(Spain) Barril	4	6	1
5	(Australia) Reitano	7	3	6
(West Germany) Buding	5	6	2
12	(France) De La Courtie	6	2	6
(Hungary) Brosszmann	3	6	1

Third round
4	(United Kingdom) Brasher	5	6	1
13	(Mexico) Reyes	7	2	6
5	(Australia) Reitano	6	6
12	(France) De La Courtie	0	2

Quarterfinals
13	(Mexico) Reyes	4	6	6
5	(Australia) Reitano	6	1	4

==== Section 3 ====
First round
(France) Galtier	4	3
(France) Seghers	6	6
(United States) Thomas	0	1
11	(United States) Hopps	6	6
(France) Nenot	6	2	5
(Australia) Hellyer	3	6	7
(Chile) Tort De Ayala
6	(South Africa) Reynolds
(United Kingdom) Edwards	8	1
(France) Rees-Lewis	10	6
(France) Berson	8	4	4
14	(Italy) Lazzarino	6	6	6
(France) Galtier	1	6	4
(United Kingdom) Ward	6	4	6
(West Germany) Zehden
3	(Brazil) Bueno

Second round
(France) Seghers	1	5
11	(United States) Hopps	6	7
(Australia) Hellyer	7	2	1
6	(South Africa) Reynolds	5	6	6
(France) Rees-Lewis	6	6	5
14	(Italy) Lazzarino	8	2	7
(United Kingdom) Ward	0	2
3	(Brazil) Bueno	6	6

Third round
11	(United States) Hopps	3	3
6	(South Africa) Reynolds	6	6
14	(Italy) Lazzarino	0	6	3
3	(Brazil) Bueno	6	1	6

Quarterfinals
6	(South Africa) Reynolds	2	6	6
3	(Brazil) Bueno	6	4	2

==== Section 4 ====
First round
(United States) Stewart	6	2	4
(France) Bouchet	3	6	6
(France) Huve	1	3
10	(Belgium) Mercelis	6	6
(France) Levy	w/o
(France) Courteix
(Australia) Muller	2	4
7	(United States) Arth	6	6
(Italy) Bassi	6	6
(France) De Lansalut	2	3
(France) Bonniard	4	2
15	(South Africa) Schuurman	6	6
(South Africa) Gerson	0	2
(New Zealand) Nettleton	6	6
(France) Le Besnerais	1	0
2	(United Kingdom) Truman	6	6

Second round
(France) Bouchet	2	6	6
10	(Belgium) Mercelis	6	3	4
(France) Courteix	6	8
7	(United States) Arth	1	6
(Italy) Bassi	6	6
15	(South Africa) Schuurman	4	2
(New Zealand) Nettleton	1	3
2	(United Kingdom) Truman	6	6

Third round
(France) Bouchet	2	3
(France) Courteix	6	6
(Italy) Bassi	2	4
2	(United Kingdom) Truman	6	6

Quarterfinals
(France) Courteix	1	6
2	(United Kingdom) Truman	6	8

Preceded by 1959 Australian Championships – Women's singles	Grand Slam women's singles	Succeeded by 1959 Wimbledon Championships – Women's singles
