= Christine Truman =

British tennis player (born 1941)

Christine Truman MBE
- Full name: Christine Clara Truman Janes
- ITF name: Christine Janes
- Country (sports): United Kingdom
- Born: 16 January 1941 (age 85) Loughton, England
- Plays: Right-handed

Singles
- Career record: 611-207 (74.7%)
- Career titles: 38
- Highest ranking: No. 2 (1959)

Grand Slam singles results
- Australian Open: SF (1960)
- French Open: W (1959)
- Wimbledon: F (1961)
- US Open: F (1959)

Grand Slam doubles results
- Australian Open: W (1960)
- French Open: SF (1959)
- Wimbledon: F (1959)

Grand Slam mixed doubles results
- Australian Open: SF (1960)
- French Open: SF (1967)
- Wimbledon: QF (1959)
- US Open: SF (1958)

Team competitions
- Wightman Cup: W (1958, 1960, 1968)

Christine Clara Truman Janes (born 16 January 1941) is a former tennis player from the United Kingdom who was active from the mid-1950s to the mid-1970s. She won a singles Grand Slam title at the French Championships in 1959 and was a finalist at Wimbledon and the U.S. Championships. She helped Great Britain win the Wightman Cup in 1958, 1960 and 1968.

== Career ==
Christine Truman was a member of a tight-knit, supportive tennis-playing family. She often entered the Wimbledon mixed doubles with her brother Humphrey. She formed a successful doubles partnership with her younger sister Nell Truman. She was the British junior champion in 1956 and 1957. Truman made her debut at Wimbledon in 1957 at age 16, beating the then French Open champion Shirley Bloomer and Betty Rosenquest, and eventually losing to eventual champion Althea Gibson in the semifinals.

In 1958, she caused a sensation by defeating Gibson, the reigning Wimbledon champion, in the Wightman Cup and helped bring the cup back to Great Britain after 21 consecutive defeats by the United States. She also beat Dorothy Knode and won her doubles with Shirley Bloomer. A few weeks later at Wimbledon, however, as the second seed she was defeated in the fourth round by the American Mimi Arnold. This loss helped start her reputation as an unpredictable player.

In 1959, she became the youngest women's singles champion at the French Championships at the age of 18, (Note: That record has since been broken by Steffi Graf in 1987, Arantxa Sánchez Vicario in 1989, and Monica Seles in 1990.) beating Sandra Reynolds in three sets and defending champion Zsuzsa Körmöczy in straight sets in the final. That year, by far her best, also saw her as the winner of the Italian Championships, beating Yola Ramírez and Sandra Reynolds In 1959, she also was runner-up at the U.S. Championships to Maria Bueno after beating Dorothy Knode and Ann Haydon. In doubles at Wimbledon, Truman partnered Beverly Baker to reach the women's doubles final (where they lost to Darlene Hard and Jeanne Arth).

In 1960, she was the third seed at Wimbledon, where she lost the semifinals to Maria Bueno in three sets. She also lost to Bueno in the semifinals of the U.S. Open. She teamed with Bueno to win the women's doubles title at the Australian Championships that year. She won the British Hard Courts championships by beating Angela Mortimer in three sets and Ann Haydon in two. She also won Queen's, beating future Wimbledon winner Karen Hantze.

In 1961, she defeated the second seed Margaret Smith in the quarterfinals after trailing 4–1 in the final set and saving two match points. She then beat Renée Schuurman in the semifinals in straight sets but lost to fellow Briton Angela Mortimer in the final.

In July 1962, it was revealed that Truman is partially blind in her left eye. After a poor year in 1962, she came back in 1963 to reach the semifinals of the French and quarterfinals of the U.S. Open, losing in three sets to Margaret Smith. She also won Monte Carlo in 1964 beating top ten players Helga Schultze, Vera Suková, and Jan Lehane and the South African championships in 1965, beating Françoise Dürr and Annette Van Zyl. She also won the doubles with Margaret Hunt Price.

Truman had another comparatively successful Wimbledon run in 1965, when unseeded, she defeated sixth-seeded Carole Caldwell Graebner, Judy Tegart, Julie Heldman, and fourth-seeded Nancy Richey. Her run to the semifinals held some irony as it was the first time in Wimbledon history that no British player had been seeded in the women's championship. She was defeated by no. 2 seed (and eventual champion) Margaret Smith in the semifinals. She had been affected by injury and illness in 1961, 1964, and 1965. In 1965, during practice for the Wightman Cup, Truman severely hurt her Achilles tendon for the second time, and this injury led to an 18-month gap in her career. After this injury, she was not ranked in the world's top 10 again.

In April 1968, she and her sister Nell Truman became the first winners of an open tennis event by winning the women's doubles title at the British Hard Court Championships in Bournemouth.

Her tennis was primarily offencive, reaching the net at the earliest possibility. She had a flat forehand of superb power, balanced with a sliced backhand, outstanding volleys and smash and hard serve.

During her career, Truman had wins over most of the other leading players of her day, including Althea Gibson (Wightman Cup 1958); Maria Bueno (Pacific Coast 1958 and Caribbean 1959); Darlene Hard several times, notably in the Wightman Cup in 1959; British rivals Angela Mortimer, Ann Haydon, Shirley Bloomer Brasher, all on several occasions; Zsuszi Körmöczy, Margaret Smith, Billie Jean Moffitt, Sandra Reynolds, Karen Hantze, and Lesley Turner. According to Lance Tingay, Truman was ranked in the world top 10 from 1957 to 1961 as well as 1965, and she reached a career high ranking of world no. 2 in 1959.

In December 1967, she married former Wasps player Gerry Janes and they have four children, including former pro tennis player Amanda Keen and six grand children. The couple remain married, but Gerry Janes has been living in managed care since being diagnosed with dementia. She retired from tennis in 1975 and became a commentator for BBC Radio in the same year. In the 2001 Birthday Honours, she was appointed a Member of the Order of the British Empire (MBE) for services to lawn tennis. Since 2011 she has published several children's books.

As of 2023, Truman is known as Doctor Christine Janes.

== Grand Slam finals ==
=== Singles: 3 (1 title, 2 runners-up) ===
Result	Year	Championship	Surface	Opponent	Score
Win	1959	French Championships	Clay	(Hungary) Zsuzsi Körmöczy	6–4, 7–5
Loss	1959	U.S. Championships	Grass	(Brazil) Maria Bueno	1–6, 4–6
Loss	1961	Wimbledon	Grass	(United Kingdom) Angela Mortimer	6–4, 4–6, 5–7

=== Doubles: 2 (1 title, 1 runner-up) ===
Result	Year	Championship	Surface	Partner	Opponents	Score
Loss	1959	Wimbledon	Grass	(United States) Beverly Baker	(United States) Jeanne Arth (United States) Darlene Hard	6–2, 2–6, 3–6
Win	1960	Australian Championships	Grass	(Brazil) Maria Bueno	(Australia) Lorraine Coghlan Robinson (Australia) Margaret Smith	6–2, 5–7, 6–2

== Grand Slam singles tournament timeline ==
Key
W	F	SF	QF	#R	RR	Q#	DNQ	A	NH

(W) winner; (F) finalist; (SF) semifinalist; (QF) quarterfinalist; (#R) rounds 4, 3, 2, 1; (RR) round-robin stage; (Q#) qualification round; (DNQ) did not qualify; (A) absent; (NH) not held; (SR) strike rate (events won / competed); (W–L) win–loss record.

Tournament	1957	1958	1959	1960	1961	1962	1963	1964	1965	1966	1967	1968	1969	1970	1971	1972	1973	1974	Career SR
Australia	A	A	A	SF	A	A	2R	A	3R	A	A	A	A	A	A	A	A	A	0 / 3
France	1R	QF	W	A	QF	4R	SF	QF	A	A	3R	A	A	A	A	A	A	A	1 / 8
Wimbledon Championships	SF	4R	4R	SF	F	3R	4R	2R	SF	A	1R	2R	4R	A	4R	A	1R	3R	0 / 15
United States	3R	QF	F	SF	QF	A	QF	A	A	A	A	A	3R	A	A	A	A	A	0 / 7
SR	0 / 3	0 / 3	1 / 3	0 / 3	0 / 3	0 / 2	0 / 4	0 / 2	0 / 2	0 / 0	0 / 2	0 / 1	0 / 2	0 / 0	0 / 1	0 / 0	0 / 1	0 / 1	1 / 33

== See also ==
- Performance timelines for all female tennis players since 1978 who reached at least one Grand Slam final
