= Sandra Reynolds =

South African tennis player

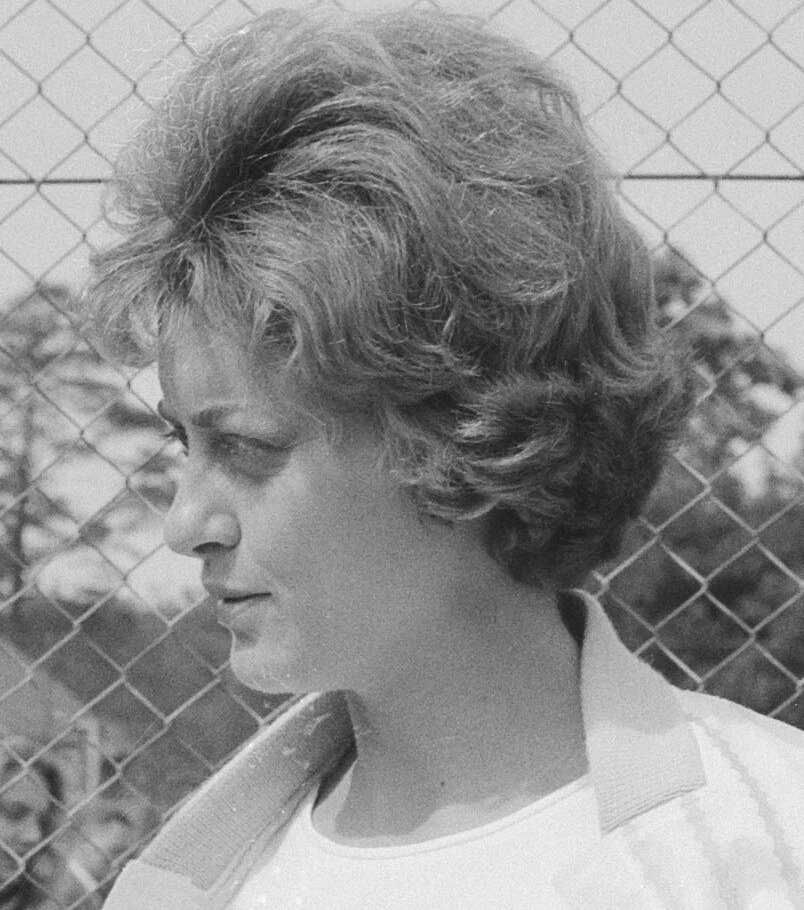
- Full name: Sandra Reynolds Price
- Country (sports): South Africa
- Born: 4 March 1934 (age 91) Bloemfontein, Orange Free State, Union of South Africa

Singles
- Highest ranking: No. 3 (1960)

Grand Slam singles results
- Australian Open: QF (1959)
- French Open: SF (1959, 1960)
- Wimbledon: F (1960)
- US Open: QF (1959, 1962)

Doubles

Grand Slam doubles results
- Australian Open: W (1959)
- French Open: W (1959, 1961, 1962)
- Wimbledon: F (1960, 1962)

Grand Slam mixed doubles results
- Australian Open: W (1959)
- French Open: QF (1962)

Sandra Reynolds Price (née Reynolds; born 4 March 1934) is a South African former tennis player who won four Grand Slam women's doubles championships and one Grand Slam mixed doubles championship. Her best Grand Slam singles result was reaching the 1960 Wimbledon final, losing to Maria Bueno 8–6, 6–0. Reynolds is the only South African woman to reach the Wimbledon singles final, and is one of three to have reached a major singles final. In 1961, she was seeded No. 1 for the Wimbledon singles event, making her the only South African player (man or woman) ever to be seeded first in a singles major. She was the runner-up at the 1959 U.S. Women's Clay Court Championships, losing to Sally Moore in the final. Price won the German Championships in 1960, 1961, and 1962. She was the runner-up at the 1959 Italian Championships, having defeated Bueno in the semifinals, then losing to Christine Truman in the final.

According to Lance Tingay of the Daily Telegraph and the Daily Mail, Price was ranked in the world top 10 from 1959 through 1962, reaching a career high of world no. 3 in 1960.

Price teamed up with fellow South African Renée Schuurman to win all four of her Grand Slam women's doubles titles. They won the Australian Championships in 1959 and the French Championships in 1959, 1961, and 1962. In addition, they were the runners-up at Wimbledon in 1960 and 1962. Price teamed with Bob Mark to win the mixed doubles title at the 1959 Australian Championships, defeating Schuurman and Rod Laver in the final in three sets.

On 28 October 1961, Reynolds married Lowell Price, a horse breeder, in Bloemfontein, and they have one daughter.

== Grand Slam finals ==
=== Singles: 1 runner-up ===
Result	Year	Championship	Surface	Opponent	Score
Loss	1960	Wimbledon	Grass	(Brazil) Maria Bueno	6–8, 0–6

=== Doubles: 6 (4 titles, 2 runners-up) ===
Result	Year	Championship	Surface	Partner	Opponents	Score
Win	1959	Australian Championships	Grass	(South Africa) Renée Schuurman	(Australia) Lorraine Coghlan (Australia) Mary Carter Reitano	7–5, 6–4
Win	1959	French Championships	Clay	(South Africa) Renée Schuurman	(Mexico) Yola Ramírez (Mexico) Rosie Reyes	2–6, 6–0, 6–1
Loss	1960	Wimbledon	Grass	(South Africa) Renée Schuurman	(Brazil) Maria Bueno (United States) Darlene Hard	4–6, 0–6
Win	1961	French Championships	Clay	(South Africa) Renée Schuurman	(Brazil) Maria Bueno (United States) Darlene Hard	walkover
Win	1962	French Championships	Clay	(South Africa) Renée Schuurman	(United States) Justina Bricka (Australia) Margaret Smith	6–4, 6–4
Loss	1962	Wimbledon	Grass	(South Africa) Renée Schuurman	(United States) Billie Jean Moffitt (United States) Karen Susman	7–5, 3–6, 5–7

=== Mixed Doubles: 1 title ===
Result	Year	Championship	Surface	Partner	Opponents	Score
Win	1959	Australian Championships	Grass	(Australia) Bob Mark	(South Africa) Renée Schuurman (Australia) Rod Laver	4–6, 13–11, 6–1

== Grand Slam singles tournament timeline ==
Key
W	F	SF	QF	#R	RR	Q#	DNQ	A	NH

(W) winner; (F) finalist; (SF) semifinalist; (QF) quarterfinalist; (#R) rounds 4, 3, 2, 1; (RR) round-robin stage; (Q#) qualification round; (DNQ) did not qualify; (A) absent; (NH) not held; (SR) strike rate (events won / competed); (W–L) win–loss record.

Tournament	1956	1957	1958	1959	1960	1961	1962	Career SR
Australian Championships	A	A	A	QF	A	A	A	0 / 1
French Championships	A	2R	4R	SF	SF	4R	QF	0 / 6
Wimbledon	2R	QF	2R	SF	F	SF	3R	0 / 7
US Championships	A	A	A	QF	A	A	QF	0 / 2
SR	0 / 1	0 / 2	0 / 2	0 / 4	0 / 2	0 / 2	0 / 3	0 / 16

== See also ==
- Performance timelines for all female tennis players since 1978 who reached at least one Grand Slam final
