= Karen Susman =

American tennis player

Karen Hantze Susman
- ITF name: Karen Susman
- Country (sports): United States
- Born: December 11, 1942 (age 83) San Diego, California, U.S.
- Plays: Right–handed

Singles
- Career record: 0–0
- Highest ranking: No. 4 (1962)

Grand Slam singles results
- French Open: QF (1964)
- Wimbledon: W (1962)
- US Open: QF (1959, 1964)

Doubles
- Career record: 0–0

Grand Slam doubles results
- French Open: 3R (1964)
- Wimbledon: W (1961, 1962)
- US Open: W (1964)

Grand Slam mixed doubles results
- French Open: 3R (1964)
- Wimbledon: QF (1960, 1964)

Karen Susman (née Hantze; born December 11, 1942, San Diego) is an American former tennis player. Susman won the women's singles title at Wimbledon in 1962. She won three Grand Slam women's doubles titles, all with Billie Jean King. She also won the 1960 Wimbledon junior girls' singles title.

Hantze Susman is currently the longest surviving Wimbledon ladies' singles champion, following the death of Angela Mortimer, the 1961 champion, who died in August 2025.

== Tennis career ==
Aged 17, Hantze reached the Quarter Finals of the women's singles at the United States Championships in 1959. She made her debut at Wimbledon in the summer of 1960, reaching the Quarter Finals of the women's singles, but going on to win the Junior Girls' singles championship.

After reaching the singles Quarter Finals again in 1961, Hantze and Billie Jean Moffitt, as an unseeded team, won the 1961 women's doubles title at Wimbledon, defeating the third-seeded team of Jan Lehane and Margaret Smith in the final in straight sets. Their combined ages made them the youngest team to win the title at the time.

Returning as Mrs. Susman in 1962 and seeded eighth in the singles, Susman won the women's singles in 1962 without losing a set. She became the first player in Wimbledon history to win both the junior and adult singles' events. Susman and Moffitt successfully defended their doubles title in 1962, defeating the South African team of Renée Schuurman and Sandra Reynolds in a three-set final.

Due to her pregnancy, Susman did not play at Wimbledon in 1963, but she returned in 1964 and unseeded, lost in the last 32 to the top seeded Margaret Smith, 11-9 6–0. Susman and Moffitt reached the 1964 women's doubles final at Wimbledon, losing to the top-seeded team of Smith and Lesley Turner. For Wimbledon's centenary celebration in 1977, Susman and (Moffitt) King teamed for the last time. As the eighth-seeded team, they were upset in the second round by the team of Mary Carillo and Trish Bostrom.

Susman and Moffitt won the 1964 women's doubles title at the U.S. Championships, defeating Smith and Turner in the final in three sets. Susman and Moffitt reached the 1962 women's doubles final at the U.S. Championships, losing to the team of Maria Bueno and Darlene Hard in three sets. They also reached the 1965 women's doubles final at the U.S. Championships, losing to the team of Nancy Richey and Carole Caldwell Graebner. Susman gave birth to her only child in October 1963 and played very little in 1963, deciding not to defend her Wimbledon singles and doubles titles. She returned to play in 1964, and at Wimbledon, she lost in a third-round match to Margaret Smith. She entered the U.S. Championships the same year, but withdrew before the tournament. Susman played little in the 1960s and 1970s, but joined the start of Team Tennis in the U.S. in 1974 and made occasional tournament appearances, returning to Wimbledon once and the US Open, where her last Grand Slam singles tournament was at the 1980 US Open. She defeated Tanya Harford in the first round and Janet Newberry in the second round, then lost to 14th-seeded Ivanna Madruga.

According to Lance Tingay of The Daily Telegraph and the Daily Mail, Susman was ranked in the world top 10 in 1961, 1962, and 1964, reaching a career high of world No. 4 in 1962. Susman was included in the year-end top 10 rankings issued by the United States Lawn Tennis Association from 1959 through 1962 and in 1964. She was the second-ranked U.S. player behind Hard from 1960 through 1962.

== Grand Slam finals ==
=== Singles: 1 (1 title) ===
Result	Year	Championship	Surface	Opponent	Score
Win	1962	Wimbledon	Grass	(Czechoslovakia) Věra Suková	6–4, 6–4

=== Doubles: 6 (3 titles, 3 runners-up) ===
Result	Year	Championship	Surface	Partner	Opponents	Score
Win	1961	Wimbledon	Grass	(United States) Billie Jean Moffitt	(Australia) Jan Lehane (Australia) Margaret Smith	6–3, 6–4
Win	1962	Wimbledon	Grass	(United States) Billie Jean Moffitt	(South Africa) Sandra Reynolds Price (South Africa) Renée Schuurman	5–7, 6–3, 7–5
Loss	1962	U.S. Championships	Grass	(United States) Billie Jean Moffitt	(Brazil) Maria Bueno (United States) Darlene Hard	4–6, 6–3, 6–2
Loss	1964	Wimbledon	Grass	(United States) Billie Jean Moffitt	(Australia) Margaret Smith (Australia) Lesley Turner	7–5, 6–2
Win	1964	U.S. Championships	Grass	(United States) Billie Jean Moffitt	(Australia) Margaret Smith (Australia) Lesley Turner	3–6, 6–2, 6–4
Loss	1965	U.S. Championships	Grass	(United States) Billie Jean Moffitt	(United States) Carole Caldwell Graebner (United States) Nancy Richey	6–4, 6–4

== Grand Slam singles tournament timeline ==
Key
W	F	SF	QF	#R	RR	Q#	DNQ	A	NH

(W) winner; (F) finalist; (SF) semifinalist; (QF) quarterfinalist; (#R) rounds 4, 3, 2, 1; (RR) round-robin stage; (Q#) qualification round; (DNQ) did not qualify; (A) absent; (NH) not held; (SR) strike rate (events won / competed); (W–L) win–loss record.

Tournament	1958	1959	1960	1961	1962	1963	1964	1965 – 1968	1969	1970 – 1975	1976	1977	1978	1979	1980	Career SR
Australia	A	A	A	A	A	A	A	A	A	A	A	A / A	A	A	A	0 / 0
France	A	A	A	A	A	A	QF	A	A	A	A	A	A	A	A	0 / 1
Wimbledon	A	A	QF	QF	W	A	3R	A	A	A	A	2R	A	A	A	1 / 5
United States	3R	QF	3R	3R	3R	A	QF	A	1R	A	1R	A	A	2R	3R	0 / 10
SR	0 / 1	0 / 1	0 / 2	0 / 2	1 / 2	0 / 0	0 / 3	0 / 0	0 / 1	0 / 0	0 / 1	0 / 1	0 / 0	0 / 1	0 / 1	1 / 16

Note: The Australian Open was held twice in 1977, in January and December.

== See also ==
- Performance timelines for all female tennis players since 1978 who reached at least one Grand Slam final
