= Betty Holstein =

Australian tennis player

Elizabeth Lorraine Holstein was an Australian tennis player. She won the girls' doubles title at the 1952, 1954 and 1958 Australian Championship (now the Australian Open).

Holstein was one of eight children and grew up in Walcha, New South Wales. Her sister Margaret also played tennis and the pair represented New South Wales in doubles' competitions together.
