= 1958 U.S. National Championships – Women's singles =

Women's singles
- 1958 U.S. National Championships

Final
- Champion: (United States) Althea Gibson
- Runner-up: (United States) Darlene Hard
- Score: 3–6, 6–1, 6–2

Details
- Seeds: 8

Events
Singles	men	women
Doubles	men	women
- U.S. National Championships

Defending champion Althea Gibson defeated Darlene Hard in the final, 3–6, 6–1, 6–2 to win the women's singles tennis title at the 1958 U.S. National Championships.

== Seeds ==
The seeded players are listed below. Althea Gibson is the champion; others show in brackets the round in which they were eliminated.

1. (United States) Althea Gibson (champion)
2. (United States) Dorothy Knode (quarterfinals)
3. (United Kingdom) Ann Haydon (third round)
4. (Brazil) Maria Bueno (quarterfinals)
5. (United States) Janet Hopps (first round)
6. (United States) Sally Moore (quarterfinals)
7. (United Kingdom) Christine Truman (quarterfinals)
8. (United States) Beverly Baker Fleitz (semifinals)

== Draw ==
=== Key ===
- Q = Qualifier
- WC = Wild card
- LL = Lucky loser
- r = Retired

=== Final eight ===
Quarterfinals
1	(United States) Althea Gibson	11	6
7	(United Kingdom) Christine Truman	9	1
4	(Brazil) Maria Bueno	1	2
8	(United States) Beverly Baker Fleitz	6	6
4	(United States) Dorothy Knode	3	2
(United States) Jeanne Arth	6	6
4	(United States) Darlene Hard	6	6
6	(United States) Sally Moore	4	3

Semifinals
1	(United States) Althea Gibson	6	6
8	(United States) Beverly Baker Fleitz	4	2
(United States) Jeanne Arth	5	2
4	(United States) Darlene Hard	7	6

Finals
1	(United States) Althea Gibson	3	6	6
(United States) Darlene Hard	6	1	2

Preceded by 1958 Wimbledon Championships – Women's singles	Grand Slam women's singles	Succeeded by 1959 Australian Championships – Women's singles
