= Dawn Robberds =

Australian tennis player

- Country (sports): Australia

Singles

Grand Slam singles results
- Australian Open: 3R (1961)

Doubles

Grand Slam doubles results
- Australian Open: QF (1961)

Grand Slam mixed doubles results
- Australian Open: 2R (1961)

Dawn Robberds was an Australian tennis player. She won the girls doubles title at the Australian Championship (now the Australian Open) in 1959 and 1960. She also won the City of Orange Tennis Club trophy for girls singles in 1957.
