= Mary Carter Reitano =

Australian tennis player

- Country (sports): Australia
- Born: 29 November 1934 (age 91)

Singles

Grand Slam singles results
- Australian Open: W (1956, 1959)
- French Open: QF (1959)
- Wimbledon: 4R (1955)

Doubles

Grand Slam doubles results
- Australian Open: W (1961)
- French Open: SF (1959)

Grand Slam mixed doubles results
- Australian Open: F (1961)

Mary Carter Reitano (née Carter; born 29 November 1934) is a former tennis player from Australia.

As a junior player, Carter won the girls' singles title at the Australian Championships in 1951 and 1952.

Reitano won the singles title at the 1956 Australian Championships, defeating Thelma Long in the final in three sets after surviving a match point in the third set. At the 1959 Australian Championships Reitano won her second singles title after a straight-sets victory in the final against Renée Schuurman. Additionally, she reached the Australian semifinals on six other occasions. She teamed up with Margaret Court to win the women's doubles title there in 1961. Reitano teamed up with three different partners to be the runner-up in women's doubles at the 1956, 1959, and 1962 Australian Championships. Reitano was also the runner-up in mixed doubles at the 1961 Australian Championships.

In February 1958, she married Sydney Reitano. She became a coaching professional in 1962.

== Grand Slam tournament finals ==
=== Singles (2 titles) ===
Result	Year	Championship	Surface	Opponent	Score
Win	1956	Australian Championships	Grass	(Australia) Thelma Long	3–6, 6–2, 9–7
Win	1959	Australian Championships	Grass	(South Africa) Renée Schuurman	6–2, 6–3

=== Doubles (1 title, 3 runners-up) ===
Result	Year	Championship	Surface	Partner	Opponent	Score
Loss	1956	Australian Championships	Grass	(Australia) Beryl Penrose	(Australia) Mary Bevis Hawton (Australia) Thelma Coyne Long	2–6, 7–5, 7–9
Loss	1959	Australian Championships	Grass	(Australia) Lorraine Coghlan	(South Africa) Renée Schuurman (South Africa) Sandra Reynolds	5–7, 4–6
Win	1961	Australian Championships	Grass	(Australia) Margaret Smith	(Australia) Mary Bevis Hawton (Australia) Jan Lehane	6–4, 3–6, 7–5
Loss	1962	Australian Championships	Grass	(United States) Darlene Hard	(Australia) Margaret Smith (Australia) Robyn Ebbern	4–6, 4–6

=== Mixed doubles (1 runner-up) ===
Result	Year	Championship	Surface	Partner	Opponent	Score
Loss	1961	Australian Championships	Grass	(Australia) John Pearce	(Australia) Jan Lehane (Australia) Bob Hewitt	7–9, 2–6

== Grand Slam singles tournament timeline ==
Key
W	F	SF	QF	#R	RR	Q#	DNQ	A	NH

(W) winner; (F) finalist; (SF) semifinalist; (QF) quarterfinalist; (#R) rounds 4, 3, 2, 1; (RR) round-robin stage; (Q#) qualification round; (DNQ) did not qualify; (A) absent; (NH) not held; (SR) strike rate (events won / competed); (W–L) win–loss record.

Tournament	1954	1955	1956	1957	1958	1959	1960	1961	1962	Career SR
Australian Championships	SF	SF	W	QF	SF	W	SF	SF	SF	2 / 9
French Championships	A	1R	A	A	1R	QF	A	4R	A	0 / 4
Wimbledon	A	4R	A	A	1R	3R	A	2R	A	0 / 4
U.S. Championships	A	A	A	A	A	A	A	A	A	0 / 0
SR	0 / 1	0 / 3	1 / 1	0 / 1	0 / 3	1 / 3	0 / 1	0 / 3	0 / 1	2 / 17

== See also ==
- Performance timelines for all female tennis players since 1978 who reached at least one Grand Slam final
