= Maria Bueno =

Brazilian tennis player (1939–2018)

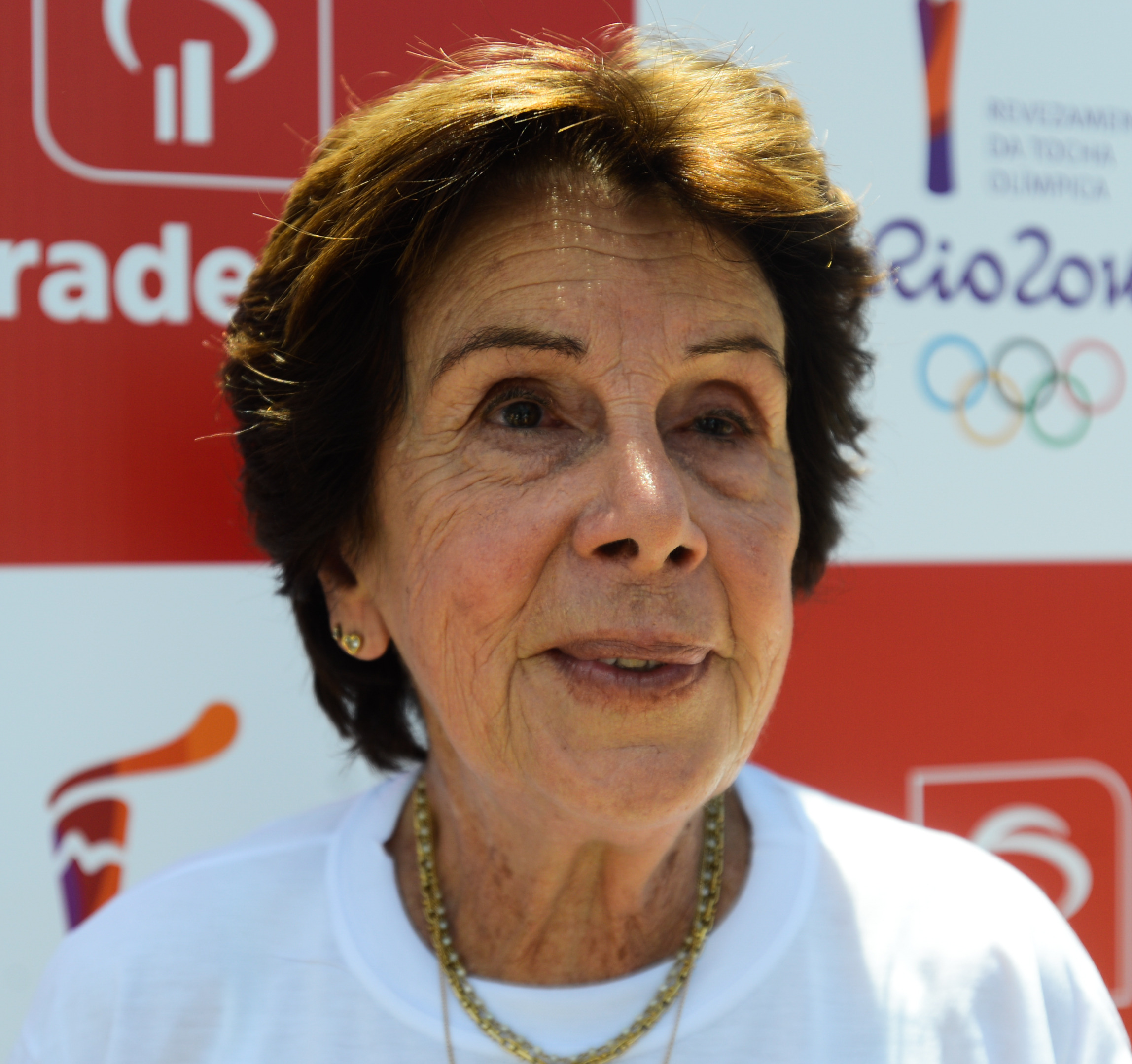
- Bueno in 2016
- Full name: Maria Esther Andion Bueno
- Country (sports): Brazil
- Born: 11 October 1939 São Paulo, Brazil
- Died: 8 June 2018 (aged 78) São Paulo, Brazil
- Height: 1.70 m (5 ft 7 in)
- Turned pro: 1950
- Retired: 1977
- Plays: Right-handed (one-handed backhand)
- Int. Tennis HoF: 1978 (member page)
- Official website: www.mariabueno.org

Singles
- Career record: 652–168 (80%)
- Career titles: 66
- Highest ranking: No. 1 (1959)

Grand Slam singles results
- Australian Open: F (1965)
- French Open: F (1964)
- Wimbledon: W (1959, 1960, 1964)
- US Open: W (1959, 1963, 1964, 1966)

Grand Slam doubles results
- Australian Open: W (1960)
- French Open: W (1960)
- Wimbledon: W (1958, 1960, 1963, 1965, 1966)
- US Open: W (1960, 1962, 1966, 1968)

Grand Slam mixed doubles results
- Australian Open: SF (1960)
- French Open: W (1960)
- Wimbledon: F (1959, 1960, 1967)
- US Open: F (1958, 1960)
Medal record
Pan American Games
Gold medal – first place	São Paulo 1963	Singles
Silver medal – second place	São Paulo 1963	Women's Doubles
Silver medal – second place	São Paulo 1963	Mixed Doubles
Bronze medal – third place	Mexico City 1955	Women's Doubles

Maria Esther Andion Bueno (11 October 1939 – 8 June 2018) was a Brazilian professional tennis player. During her 11-year career in the 1950s and 1960s, she won 19 major titles (seven in women's singles, 11 in women's doubles and one in mixed doubles), making her the most successful South American tennis player in history and the only one ever to win Wimbledon in singles. Bueno was the year-end No. 1 female player in 1959 and 1960 and was known for her graceful style of play, that earned her the nickname "tennis ballerina".

In 1960, Bueno became the first woman to win the Grand Slam in doubles (all four majors in a year), three of them partnering Darlene Hard and one with Christine Truman.

For 65 years, Bueno remained the only Brazilian woman to have won a Grand Slam title, until Luisa Stefani won the mixed doubles title alongside fellow Brazilian Rafael Matos at the Australian Open in 2023.

== Tennis career ==
Bueno was born in São Paulo. Her father, a businessman, was a keen club tennis player. Her elder brother Pedro was also a tennis player. She began playing tennis aged six at the Clube de Regatas Tiete in São Paulo and, without having received any formal training, won her first tournament at age 12. She was 15 when she won her country's women's singles championship. She first went abroad in 1957 at age 17 and won the Orange Bowl juniors tournament in Florida, USA.

Joining the international circuit in 1958, Bueno won the singles title at the Italian Championships, aged eighteen years old at the time, in a campaign that included defeating Shirley Brasher in the quarterfinals, where she saved match points. (Note: Bueno won the Italian Championships again in 1961 and 1965 to become the second three-time winner of the tournament after Margaret Smith.)

The same year she gained the first of her Grand Slam titles, winning the women's doubles at Wimbledon with Althea Gibson. The following year, Bueno won her first singles title at Wimbledon, defeating Darlene Hard in the final. She also won the singles title at the U.S. Championships after a straight-sets victory in the final against Christine Truman, earning the World No. 1 ranking for 1959 and the Associated Press Female Athlete of the Year award. Bueno was the first non-North-American woman to win both Wimbledon and the U.S. Championships in the same calendar year. In her native Brazil, she returned as a national heroine, honoured by the country's president and given a ticker-tape parade on the streets of São Paulo.

Between 1958 and 1967, Bueno won 115 matches at the Wimbledon Championships, with 49 of them being in the singles competition.

According to Lance Tingay of the Daily Telegraph and the Daily Mail and Bud Collins, Bueno was ranked in the world top ten from 1958 through 1960 and from 1962 through 1968, reaching a career high of World No. 1 in those rankings in 1959 and 1960. The International Tennis Hall of Fame also lists her as the top ranked player in 1964 (after losing the final at the French Championships and winning both Wimbledon and the U.S. Championships) and 1966. Bueno won the singles title at Wimbledon three times and at the U.S. Championships four times. She was a singles finalist at the Australian Championships and the French Championships, losing both finals to Margaret Smith. Bueno reached at least the quarterfinals in each of the first 26 Grand Slam singles tournaments she played. This streak ended at Wimbledon in 1967 when she lost in the fourth round because of an arm injury.

As a doubles player, Bueno won twelve Grand Slam championships with six different partners. In 1960, she became the first woman to win the women's doubles title at all four Grand Slam tournaments in the same calendar year, partnered with Christine Truman at the Australian Championships and Hard at the French Championships, Wimbledon and the U.S. Championships.

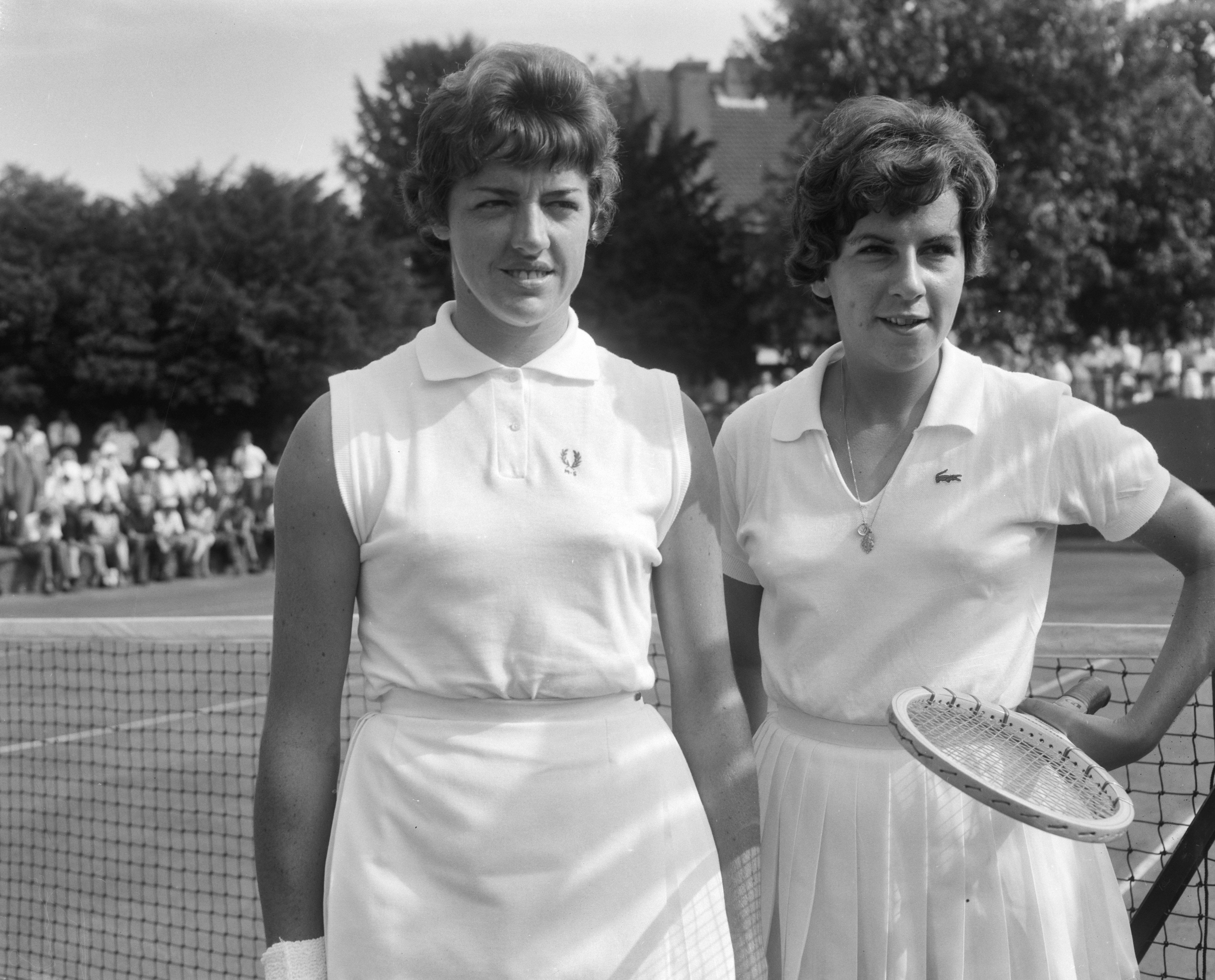
Maria Bueno with Margaret Court in 1964

Her playing career was affected by various arm and leg injuries. She played only intermittently after 1968; her final tournament win was the Japan Open in 1974, her only professional win. She retired from playing in 1977.

Her playing style was described as bold and aggressive; she had a hard serve, was a strong volleyer and often came into the net. Bud Collins described her as "incomparably balletic and flamboyant". She did not use a coach and attributed her speed on the court to training with men. The American player Billie Jean King acknowledged her as an influence, often citing her as one of her "sheroes". She was also known for her on-court style, wearing tennis dresses designed by Ted Tinling.

== Later career ==
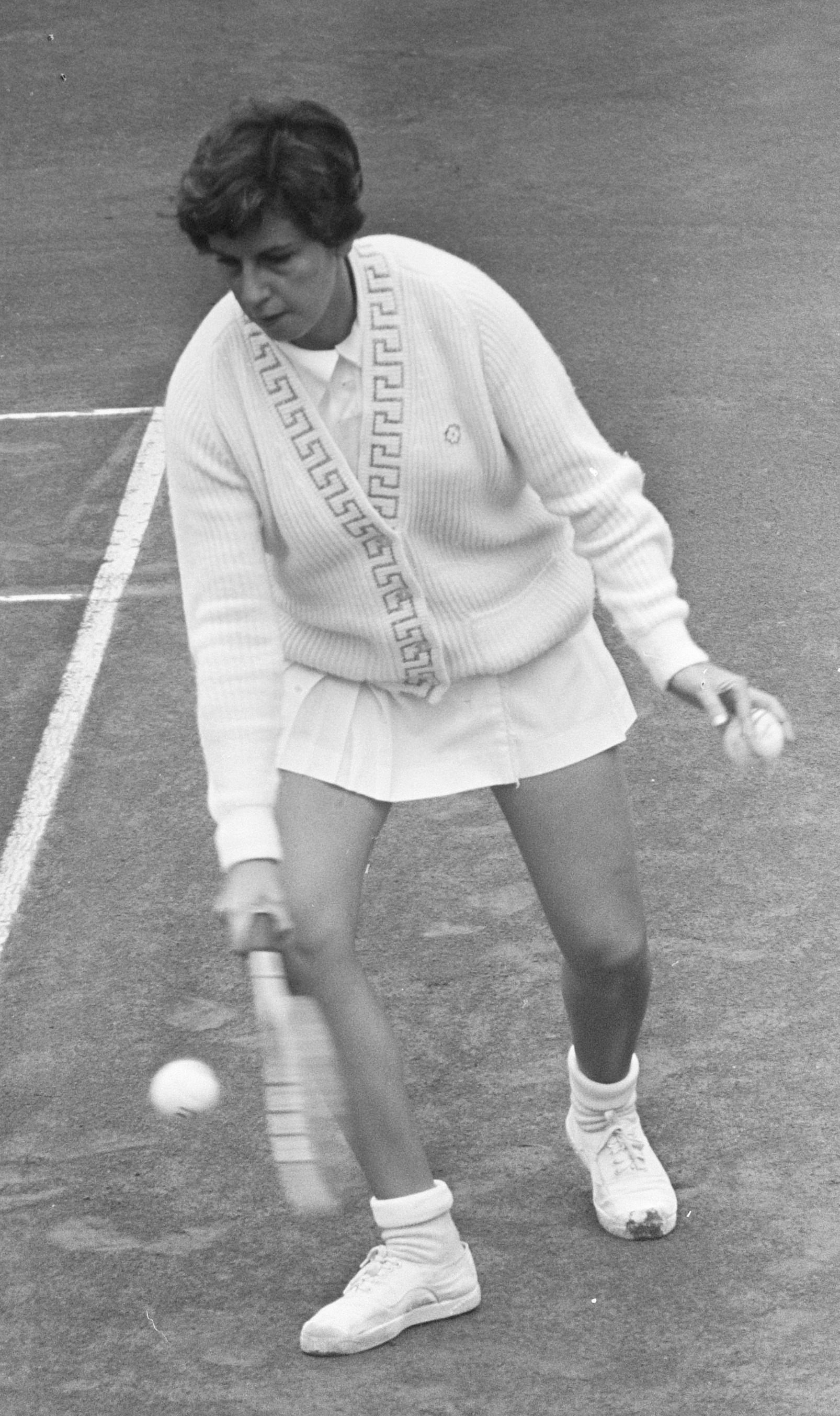
Bueno in July 1964 at a tournament in the Netherlands.

Bueno worked as a commentator for SporTV, a Brazilian cable television sports channel.

One of the last public appearances by Maria Bueno was at the 2016 Summer Olympics closing ceremony, in which she carried the national flag of Brazil during the playing of the Brazilian national anthem.

== Death ==
Bueno died on 8 June 2018, aged 78, at a hospital in São Paulo, Brazil, where she had been admitted for mouth cancer. She was diagnosed in 2016 with virulent Merkel-cell carcinoma, a rare and highly aggressive skin cancer. A minute's applause in honour of Bueno was held as a tribute before the Women's Singles final at the 2018 French Open the day after her death.

== Honours ==
In 1959 Correios do Brasil issued a postal stamp honouring her title at the Wimbledon Ladies Singles Championships. That same year the Associated Press voted her Female Athlete of the Year. In 1978, Bueno was inducted into the International Tennis Hall of Fame in Newport, Rhode Island.

Bueno was awarded the International Club's prestigious Jean Borotra Sportsmanship Award in 2003.

The Seniors World Team Championships for the women's 50 age category is named "Maria Esther Bueno Cup" by the International Tennis Federation (ITF) in her honour. In 2015 the centre court of the Olympic Tennis Centre in Rio de Janeiro was named after her.

In October 2018, Maria Esther Bueno received the Medal of Sporting Merit from the Chamber of Councilors of São Paulo, according to the Resolution 03/2014. The award is instituted within the scope of the Municipality of São Paulo, to be awarded annually to the entity or citizen of São Paulo in recognition of the relevance of services rendered in favor of sport in the Municipality of São Paulo, or that, in any case, have contributed to the aggrandizement of the sport or significantly encourage its practice, whether through personal goals achieved or activity with society.

The Maria Esther Bueno Cup, an under-24 men's tennis competition that ran from 2018 to 2023, was named in her honour.

The centre court used at the SP Open tournament in the Villa-Lobos State Park is named in her honour.

=== Statues ===
Several statues honoring Bueno have been unveiled over the years.

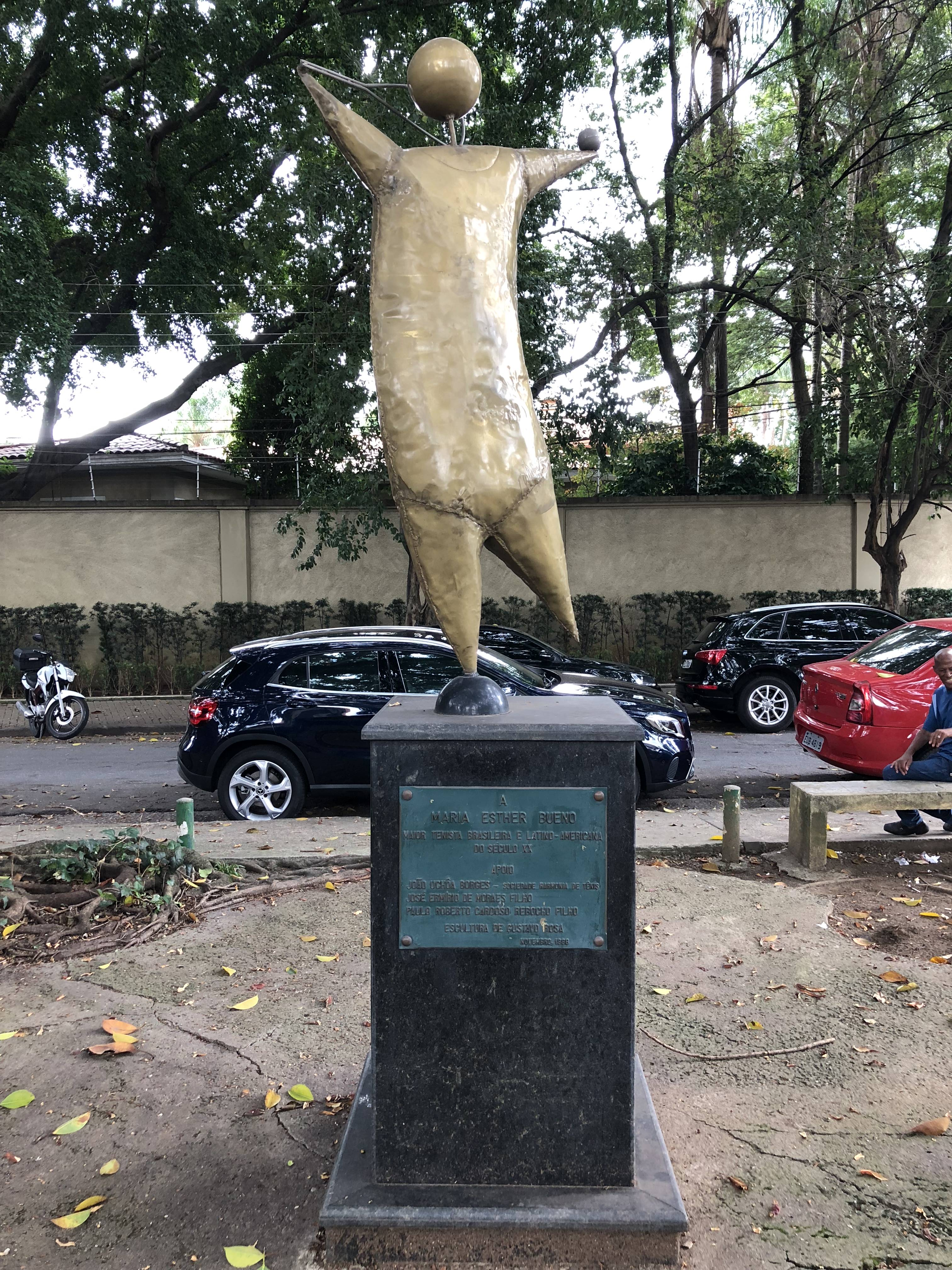
Bueno's statue by Gustavo Rosa

One of them, made by artist Gustavo Rosa and unveiled in 1998, is located in the California square, in the neighbourhood of Jardim América in the city of São Paulo, Brazil.

Another one, also located in São Paulo, in front of the Pacaembu Stadium, in the neighbourhood of the same name, was made by artist Arlindo Castellane de Carli and unveiled in 1960 and initially located next to the main gates of the stadium, but was later moved closer to the stadium´s tennis courts in 1989.

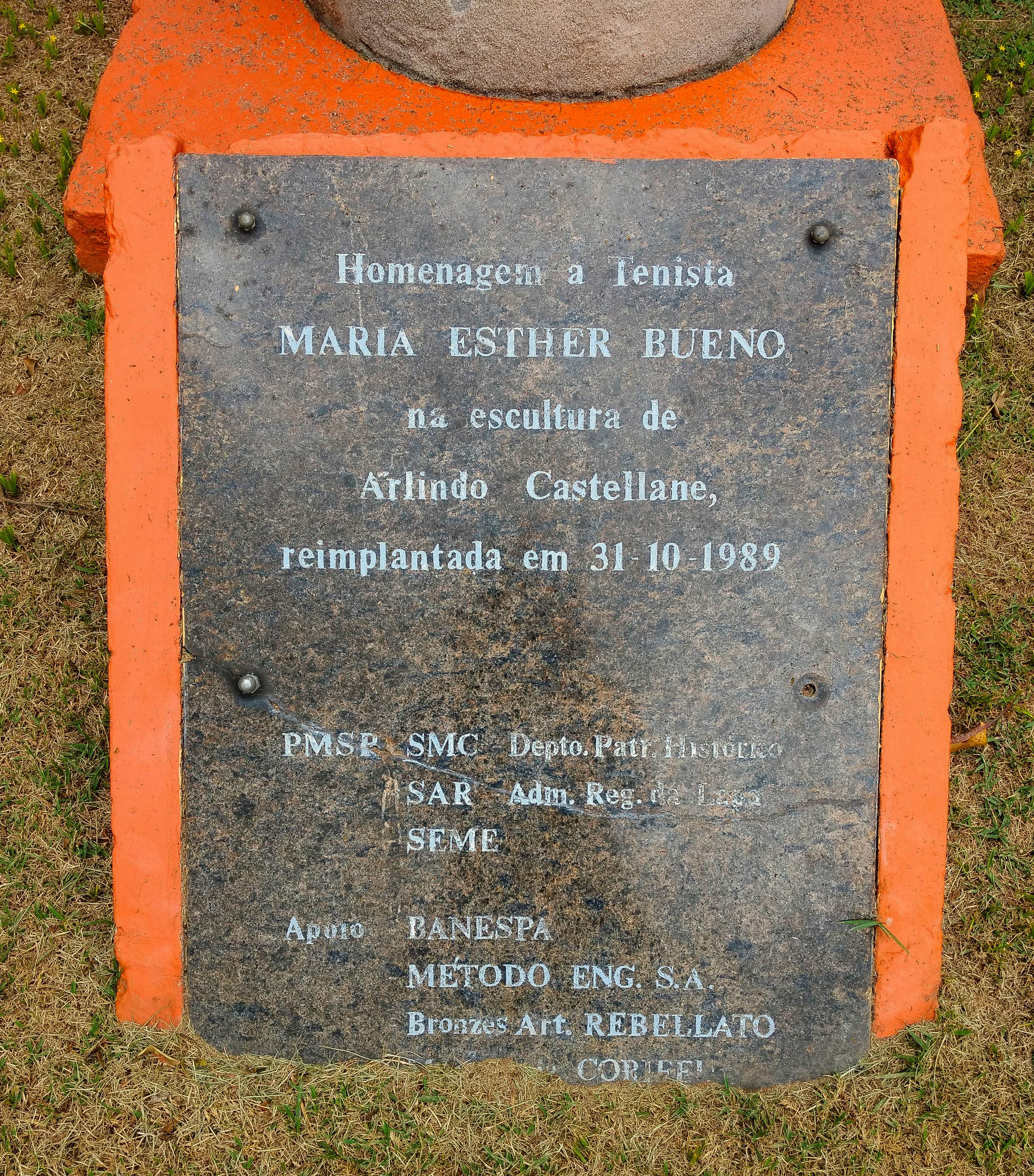
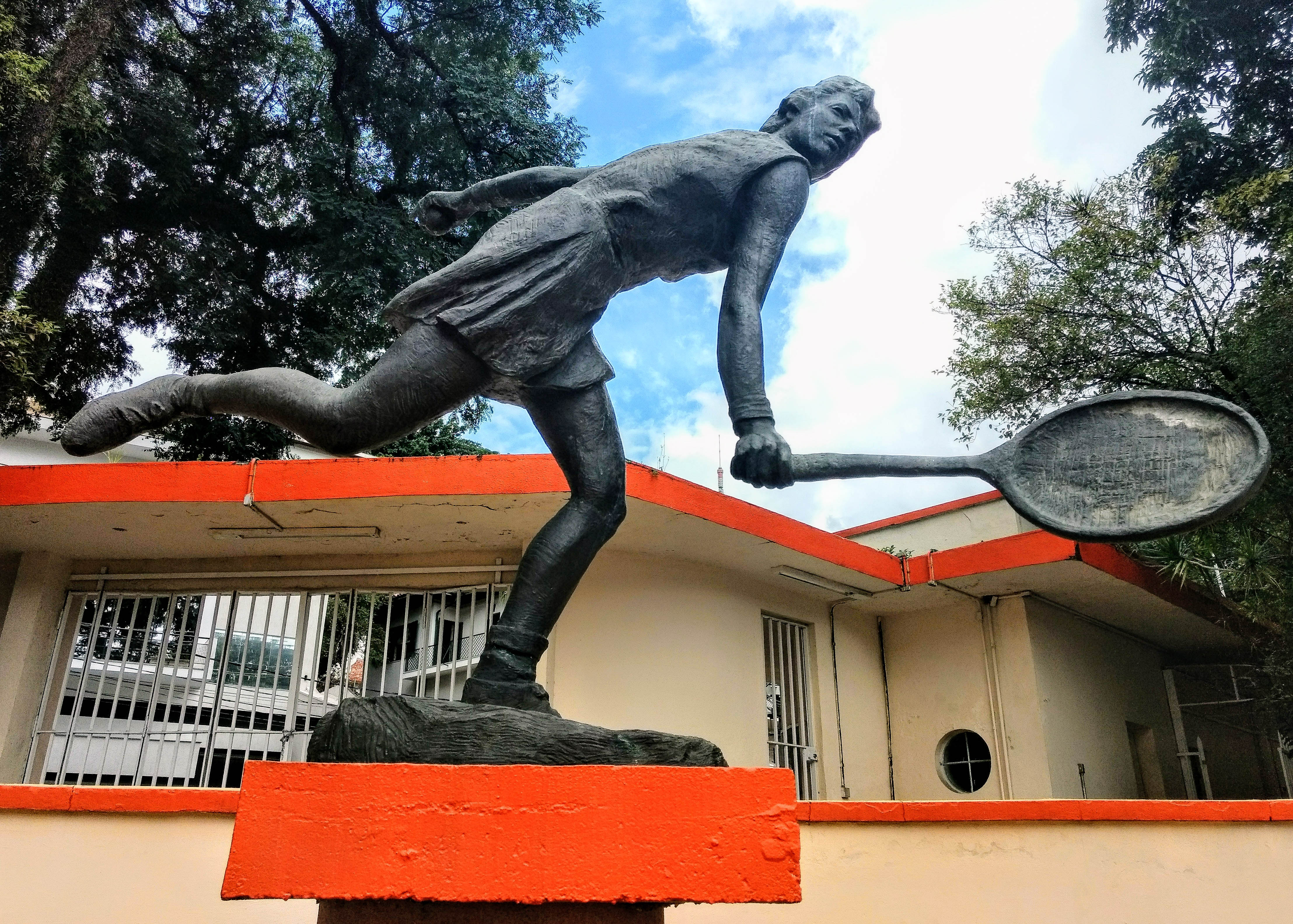
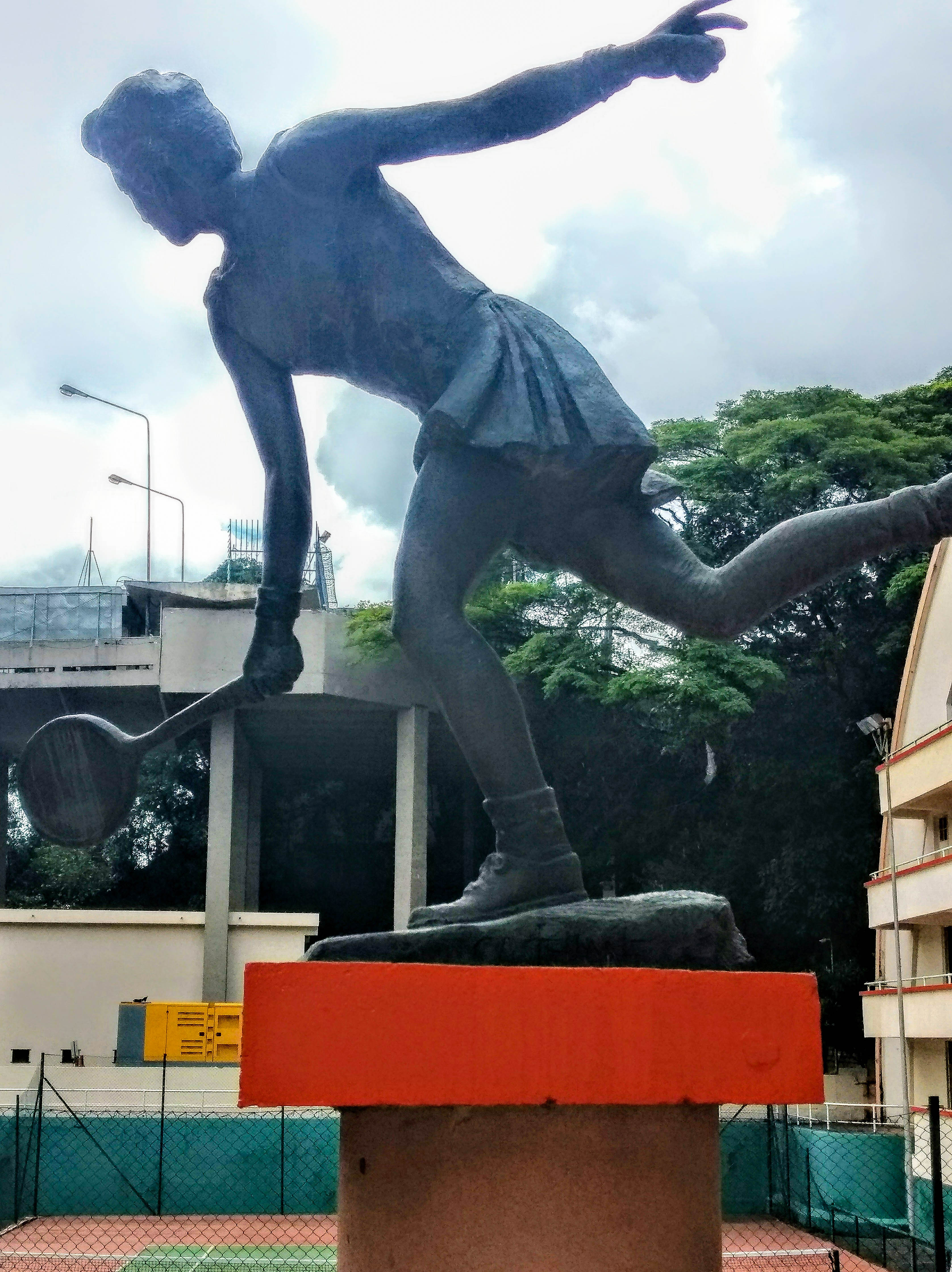
Bueno's statue by Arlindo Castellane de Carli

On 24 November 2018, the Sociedade Harmonia de Tênis club in São Paulo unveiled a statue of Bueno during the Maria Esther Bueno Cup. The ceremony, attended by members of her family, also featured an exhibition of trophies and clothing celebrating her career.

A 190 kilograms and 2.37 meters statue of Bueno created by artist Celina Kihel Lara Leite Ribeiro was inaugurated in March 2000 at the headquarters of the Federação Paulista de Tênis. In 2025, it was displayed to the public for the first time during the SP Open.

== Grand Slam finals ==
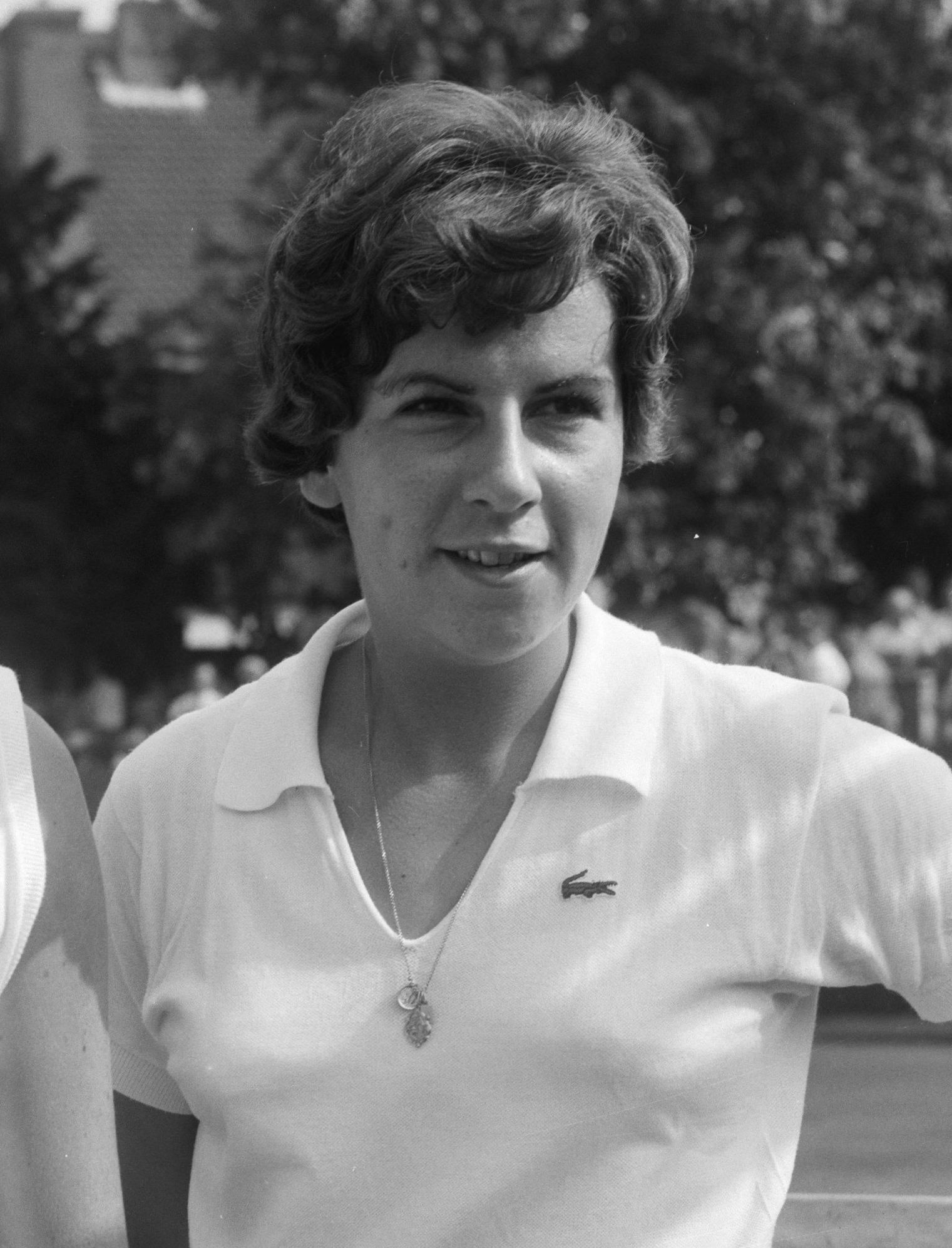
Bueno in 1964

Bueno won 19 of her 35 Grand Slam finals. This represents a success rate of 54%.

=== Singles: 12 (7 titles, 5 runners-up) ===
Result	Year	Championship	Surface	Opponent	Score
Won	1959	Wimbledon	Grass	(United States) Darlene Hard	6–4, 6–3
Won	1959	U.S. Championships	Grass	(United Kingdom) Christine Truman	6–1, 6–4
Won	1960	Wimbledon (2)	Grass	(South Africa) Sandra Reynolds	8–6, 6–0
Loss	1960	U.S. Championships	Grass	(United States) Darlene Hard	4–6, 12–10, 4–6
Won	1963	U.S. Championships (2)	Grass	(Australia) Margaret Court	7–5, 6–4
Loss	1964	French Championships	Clay	(Australia) Margaret Court	7–5, 1–6, 2–6
Won	1964	Wimbledon (3)	Grass	(Australia) Margaret Court	6–4, 7–9, 6–3
Won	1964	U.S. Championships (3)	Grass	(United States) Carole Caldwell Graebner	6–1, 6–0
Loss	1965	Australian Championships	Grass	(Australia) Margaret Court	7–5, 4–6, 2–5, ret.
Loss	1965	Wimbledon	Grass	(Australia) Margaret Court	4–6, 5–7
Loss	1966	Wimbledon	Grass	(United States) Billie Jean King	3–6, 6–3, 1–6
Won	1966	U.S. Championships (4)	Grass	(United States) Nancy Richey	6–3, 6–1

=== Doubles: 16 (11 wins, 5 runners-up) ===
Result	Year	Championship	Surface	Partner	Opponents	Score
Won	1958	Wimbledon	Grass	(United States) Althea Gibson	(United States) Margaret Osborne duPont (United States) Margaret Varner	6–3, 7–5
Loss	1958	U.S. Championships	Grass	(United States) Althea Gibson	(United States) Jeanne Arth (United States) Darlene Hard	6–2, 3–6, 4–6
Loss	1959	U.S. Championships	Grass	(United States) Sally Moore	(United States) Jeanne Arth (United States) Darlene Hard	2–6, 3–6
Won	1960	Australian Championships	Grass	(United Kingdom) Christine Truman	(Australia) Lorraine Coghlan Robinson (Australia) Margaret Court	6–2, 5–7, 6–2
Won	1960	French Championships	Clay	(United States) Darlene Hard	(United Kingdom) Ann Haydon-Jones (United Kingdom) Patricia Ward Hales	6–2, 7–5
Won	1960	Wimbledon (2)	Grass	(United States) Darlene Hard	(South Africa) Sandra Reynolds (South Africa) Renée Schuurman	6–4, 6–0
Won	1960	U.S. Championships	Grass	(United States) Darlene Hard	(United Kingdom) Ann Haydon-Jones (United Kingdom) Deidre Catt	6–1, 6–1
Loss	1961	French Championships	Clay	(United States) Darlene Hard	(South Africa) Sandra Reynolds (South Africa) Renée Schuurman	walkover
Won	1962	U.S. Championships (2)	Grass	(United States) Darlene Hard	(United States) Billie Jean Moffitt (United States) Karen Hantze Susman	4–6, 6–3, 6–2
Won	1963	Wimbledon (3)	Grass	(United States) Darlene Hard	(Australia) Margaret Court (Australia) Robyn Ebbern	8–6, 9–7
Loss	1963	U.S. Championships	Grass	(United States) Darlene Hard	(Australia) Margaret Court (Australia) Robyn Ebbern	6–4, 8–10, 3–6
Won	1965	Wimbledon (4)	Grass	(United States) Billie Jean Moffitt	(France) Françoise Dürr (France) Janine Lieffrig	6–2, 7–5
Won	1966	Wimbledon (5)	Grass	(United States) Nancy Richey	(Australia) Margaret Court (Australia) Judy Tegart	6–3, 4–6, 6–4
Won	1966	U.S. Championships (3)	Grass	(United States) Nancy Richey	(United States) Billie Jean King (United States) Rosemary Casals	6–3, 6–4
Loss	1967	Wimbledon	Grass	(United States) Nancy Richey	(United States) Rosemary Casals (United States) Billie Jean King	11–9, 4–6, 2–6
Won	1968	US Open (4)	Grass	(Australia) Margaret Court	(United States) Billie Jean King (United States) Rosemary Casals	4–6, 9–7, 8–6

=== Mixed doubles: 7 (1 win, 6 runners-up) ===
Result	Year	Championship	Surface	Partner	Opponents	Score
Loss	1958	U.S. Championships	Grass	(United States) Alex Olmedo	(United States) Margaret Osborne duPont (Australia) Neale Fraser	3–6, 6–3, 7–9
Loss	1959	Wimbledon	Grass	(Australia) Neale Fraser	(United States) Darlene Hard (Australia) Rod Laver	4–6, 3–6
Won	1960	French Championships	Clay	(Australia) Bob Howe	(United Kingdom) Ann Haydon-Jones (Australia) Roy Emerson	1–6, 6–1, 6–2
Loss	1960	Wimbledon	Grass	(Australia) Bob Howe	(United States) Darlene Hard (Australia) Rod Laver	11–13, 6–3, 6–8
Loss	1960	U.S. Championships	Grass	(Mexico) Antonio Palafox	(United States) Margaret Osborne duPont (Australia) Neale Fraser	3–6, 2–6
Loss	1965	French Championships	Clay	(Australia) John Newcombe	(Australia) Margaret Court (Australia) Ken Fletcher	4–6, 4–6
Loss	1967	Wimbledon	Grass	(Australia) Ken Fletcher	(United States) Billie Jean King (Australia) Owen Davidson	6–3, 2–6, 13–15

== Grand Slam singles tournament timeline ==
Key
W	F	SF	QF	#R	RR	Q#	DNQ	A	NH

(W) winner; (F) finalist; (SF) semifinalist; (QF) quarterfinalist; (#R) rounds 4, 3, 2, 1; (RR) round-robin stage; (Q#) qualification round; (DNQ) did not qualify; (A) absent; (NH) not held; (SR) strike rate (events won / competed); (W–L) win–loss record.

Tournament	1957	1958	1959	1960	1961	1962	1963	1964	1965	1966	1967	1968	1969–1975	1976	1977	Career SR
Australia	A	A	A	QF	A	A	A	A	F	A	A	A	A	A	A / A	0 / 2
France	1R	SF	QF	SF	QF	A	A	F	SF	SF	QF	QF	A	1R	A	0 / 11
Wimbledon	A	QF	W	W	A	SF	QF	W	F	F	4R	QF	A	4R	3R	3 / 12
United States	A	QF	W	F	A	SF	W	W	SF	W	2R	SF	A	3R	2R	4 / 12
SR	0 / 1	0 / 3	2 / 3	1 / 4	0 / 1	0 / 2	1 / 2	2 / 3	0 / 4	1 / 3	0 / 3	0 / 3	0 / 0	0 / 3	0 / 2	7 / 37

Note: The Australian Open was held twice in 1977, in January and December.

== See also ==
- Performance timelines for all female tennis players since 1978 who reached at least one Grand Slam final
