= Renée Schuurman =

South African tennis player

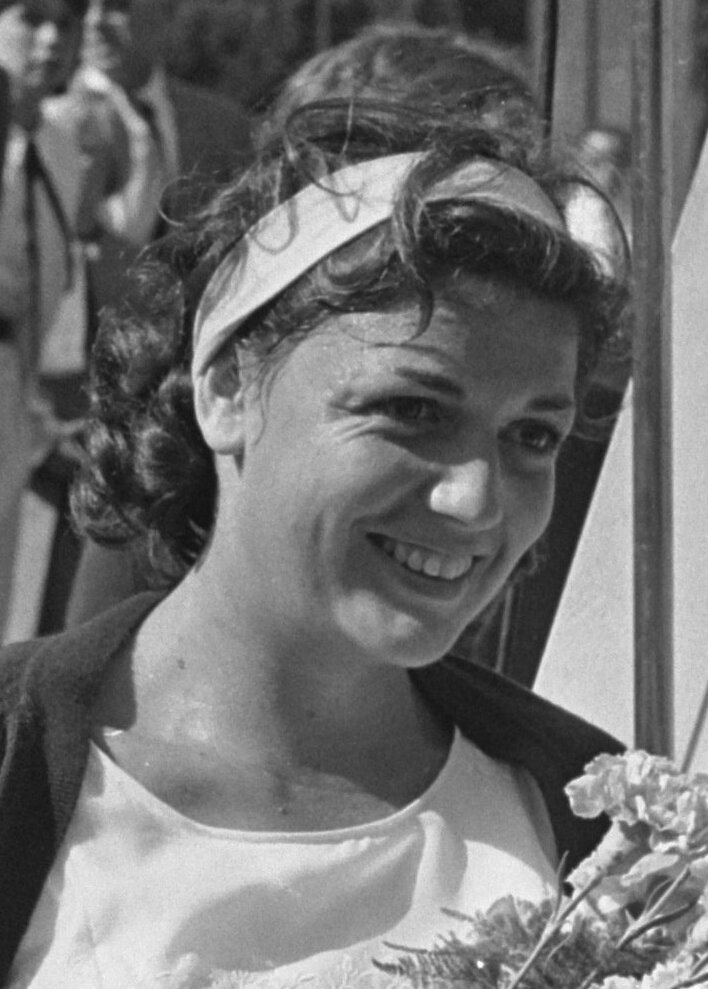
- Renée Schuurman (1963)
- Full name: Renée Schuurman Haygarth
- ITF name: Renee Schuurman
- Country (sports): South Africa
- Born: 26 October 1939 Durban, Natal, Union of South Africa
- Died: 30 May 2001 (aged 61) Howick, KwaZulu-Natal, South Africa
- Plays: Right-handed

Singles
- Career record: unknown value
- Highest ranking: No. 8 (1963)

Grand Slam singles results
- Australian Open: F (1959)
- French Open: SF (1962)
- Wimbledon: SF (1961)
- US Open: 3R (1962)

Doubles
- Career record: unknown value

Grand Slam doubles results
- Australian Open: W (1959)
- French Open: W (1959, 1961, 1962, 1963)
- Wimbledon: F (1960, 1962)

Grand Slam mixed doubles results
- Australian Open: F (1959)
- French Open: W (1962)
- Wimbledon: QF (1963, 1964)

Renée Schuurman Haygarth (née Schuurman; 26 October 1939 – 30 May 2001) was a South African tennis player who won five Grand Slam women's doubles titles and one Grand Slam mixed doubles title.

== Biography ==
Schuurman teamed with fellow South African Sandra Reynolds to win four Grand Slam women's doubles titles. They won the 1959 Australian Championships and the 1959, 1961, and 1962 French Championships. In addition, they were the runners-up at Wimbledon in 1960 and 1962. Schuurman won her other Grand Slam women's doubles title with Ann Haydon-Jones at the 1963 French Championships. They defeated Margaret Court and Robyn Ebbern in the final.

In April 1962, she defeated Angela Mortimer in the final of the British Hard Court Championships.

Schuurman and Bob Howe won the mixed doubles title at the 1962 French Championships. She and Rod Laver were twice finalists in Grand Slam mixed doubles tournaments: at the 1959 Australian and French Championships. Her best Grand Slam singles result was when she reached the final at the 1959 Australian Championships, losing to Mary Carter Reitano 6–2, 6–3. Schuurman won the German Championships in 1963, defeating Lesley Turner in the final in three sets.

According to Lance Tingay of The Daily Telegraph and the Daily Mail, Schuurman was ranked in the world top 10 from 1960 through 1963, reaching a career high of World No. 8 in those rankings in 1963.

She married Peter Haygarth on 29 May 1964 in Durban. Her second marriage, to Robin Osborne, took place in 1977.

== Grand Slam finals ==
=== Singles (1 runner-up) ===
Result	Year	Championship	Surface	Opponents	Score
Loss	1959	Australian Championships	Grass	(Australia) Mary Carter Reitano	2–6, 3–6

=== Doubles (5 titles, 2 runner-ups) ===
Result	Year	Championship	Surface	Partner	Opponents	Score
Win	1959	Australian Championships	Grass	(South Africa) Sandra Reynolds	(Australia) Lorraine Coghlan (Australia) Mary Carter Reitano	7–5, 6–4
Win	1959	French Championships	Clay	(South Africa) Sandra Reynolds	(Mexico) Yola Ramírez (Mexico) Rosie Reyes	2–6, 6–0, 6–1
Loss	1960	Wimbledon	Grass	(South Africa) Sandra Reynolds	(Brazil) Maria Bueno (United States) Darlene Hard	4–6, 0–6
Win	1961	French Championships	Clay	(South Africa) Sandra Reynolds	(Brazil) Maria Bueno (United States) Darlene Hard	walkover
Win	1962	French Championships	Clay	(South Africa) Sandra Reynolds	(United States) Justina Bricka (Australia) Margaret Smith	6–4, 6–4
Loss	1962	Wimbledon	Grass	(South Africa) Sandra Reynolds	(United States) Billie Jean Moffitt (United States) Karen Susman	7–5, 3–6, 5–7
Win	1963	French Championships	Clay	(United Kingdom) Ann Haydon-Jones	(Australia) Robyn Ebbern (Australia) Margaret Smith	7–5, 6–4

=== Mixed doubles (1 title, 2 runners-up) ===
Result	Year	Championship	Surface	Partner	Opponents	Score
Loss	1959	Australian Championships	Grass	(Australia) Rod Laver	(South Africa) Sandra Reynolds (Australia) Bob Mark	6–4, 11–13, 1–6
Loss	1959	French Championships	Clay	(Australia) Rod Laver	(United Kingdom) Billy Knight (Mexico) Yola Ramírez	4–6, 4–6
Win	1962	French Championships	Clay	(Australia) Robert Howe	(Australia) Lesley Turner (Australia) Fred Stolle	3–6, 6–4, 6–4

== Grand Slam singles tournament timeline ==
Key
W	F	SF	QF	#R	RR	Q#	DNQ	A	NH

(W) winner; (F) finalist; (SF) semifinalist; (QF) quarterfinalist; (#R) rounds 4, 3, 2, 1; (RR) round-robin stage; (Q#) qualification round; (DNQ) did not qualify; (A) absent; (NH) not held; (SR) strike rate (events won / competed); (W–L) win–loss record.

Tournament	1955	1956	1957	1958	1959	1960	1961	1962	1963	1964	Career SR
Australian Championships	A	A	A	A	F	A	A	A	A	A	0 / 1
French Championships	A	A	1R	2R	3R	QF	4R	SF	3R	A	0 / 7
Wimbledon	1R	A	2R	2R	1R	QF	SF	QF	QF	2R	0 / 9
U.S. Championships	A	A	A	A	2R	A	A	3R	A	A	0 / 2
SR	0 / 1	0 / 0	0 / 2	0 / 2	0 / 4	0 / 2	0 / 2	0 / 3	0 / 2	0 / 1	0 / 19

== See also ==
- Performance timelines for all female tennis players since 1978 who reached at least one Grand Slam final
