= 1962 Wimbledon Championships – Mixed doubles =

Mixed doubles
- 1962 Wimbledon Championships

Final
- Champions: (Australia) Neale Fraser (United States) Margaret duPont
- Runners-up: (United States) Dennis Ralston (United Kingdom) Ann Haydon
- Score: 2–6, 6–3, 13–11

Details
- Draw: 80 (5Q)
- Seeds: 4

Events
Singles	men	women		boys	girls
Doubles	men	women	mixed	boys	girls
- Wimbledon Championships

Fred Stolle and Lesley Turner were the defending champions, but lost in the semifinals to Neale Fraser and Margaret duPont.

Fraser and duPont defeated Dennis Ralston and Ann Haydon in the final, 2–6, 6–3, 13–11 to win the mixed doubles tennis title at the 1962 Wimbledon Championships.

== Seeds ==
1. (Australia) Fred Stolle / (Australia) Lesley Turner (semifinals)
2. (Australia) Bob Howe / (Brazil) Maria Bueno (semifinals)
3. (Australia) Neale Fraser / (United States) Margaret duPont (champions)
4. (Czechoslovakia) Jiří Javorský / (Czechoslovakia) Věra Suková (quarterfinals)

Click on the seed number of a player to go to their draw section.

== Draw ==
Key

- Q = Qualifier
- WC = Wild card
- LL = Lucky loser
- Alt = Alternate
- ITF = ITF entry
- PR = Protected ranking
- SR = Special ranking
- SE = Special exempt
- JE = Junior exempt
- JR = Junior Accelerator Programme entrant
- CO = College Accelerator Programme entrant
- NG = Next Gen Accelerator Program entrant
- w/o = Walkover
- r = Retired
- d = Defaulted

=== Finals ===
Quarterfinals
2	(Australia) Bob Howe (Brazil) Maria Bueno	6	6
(United Kingdom) Mike Sangster (United Kingdom) Deidre Catt	4	4
4	(Czechoslovakia) Jiří Javorský (Czechoslovakia) Věra Suková	3	2
(United States) Dennis Ralston (United Kingdom) Ann Haydon	6	6
(United Kingdom) Billy Knight (United Kingdom) Jean Knight	2	7	8
3	(Australia) Neale Fraser (United States) Margaret duPont	6	5	10
(South Africa) Gordon Forbes (South Africa) Jean Forbes	6	1	3
1	(Australia) Fred Stolle (Australia) Lesley Turner	0	6	6

Semifinals
2	(Australia) Bob Howe (Brazil) Maria Bueno	3	10	4
(United States) Dennis Ralston (United Kingdom) Ann Haydon	6	8	6
3	(Australia) Neale Fraser (United States) Margaret duPont	4	6	6
1	(Australia) Fred Stolle (Australia) Lesley Turner	6	3	4

Final
(United States) Dennis Ralston (United Kingdom) Ann Haydon	6	3	11
3	(Australia) Neale Fraser (United States) Margaret duPont	2	6	13

=== Top half ===
==== Section 1 ====
First round

Second round
2	(Australia) Bob Howe (Brazil) Maria Bueno	6	6
(India) Narenda Nath (West Germany) Helga Schultze	4	2
(Brazil) José Edison Mandarino (Spain) Carmen Coronado	5	5
(France) Pierre Darmon (France) Rosie Darmon	7	7
(Australia) Alan Lane (Belgium) Christiane Mercelis	6	2	1
(Brazil) Carlos Fernandes (Australia) Margaret Hellyer	4	6	6
Q	(Federation of Rhodesia and Nyasaland) Frank Salomon (United States) Pat Edrich	5	1
(United Kingdom) John Barrett (United Kingdom) Billie Woodgate	7	6

Third round
2	(Australia) R Howe (Brazil) M Bueno	6	6
(France) P Darmon (France) R Darmon	1	3
(Brazil) C Fernandes (Australia) M Hellyer	3	6	6
(United Kingdom) J Barrett (United Kingdom) R Woodgate	6	3	4

Fourth round
2	(Australia) R Howe (Brazil) M Bueno	7	6
(Brazil) C Fernandes (Australia) M Hellyer	5	4

==== Section 2 ====
First round

Second round
(South Africa) Cliff Drysdale (South Africa) Valerie Forbes	6	6	6
(Australia) Bob Hewitt (Australia) Robyn Ebbern	8	4	1
(Italy) Alberto Lazzarino (Italy) Silvana Lazzarino
(United Kingdom) Gerry Oakley (United Kingdom) Honor Clarke	w/o
(South Africa) Abe Segal (United Kingdom) Thelma Lister	4	5
(United Kingdom) Tony Pickard (South Africa) Renée Schuurman	6	7
Q	(Australia) Allan Kendall (United Kingdom) Jenny Young	4	4
(United Kingdom) Mike Sangster (United Kingdom) Deidre Catt	6	6

Third round
(South Africa) C Drysdale (South Africa) V Forbes	6	6
(Italy) A Lazzarino (Italy) S Lazzarino	3	2
(United Kingdom) A Pickard (South Africa) R Schuurman	6	3	4
(United Kingdom) M Sangster (United Kingdom) D Catt	4	6	6

Fourth round
(South Africa) C Drysdale (South Africa) V Forbes	7	2
(United Kingdom) M Sangster (United Kingdom) D Catt	9	6

==== Section 3 ====
First round

Second round
4	(Czechoslovakia) Jiří Javorský (Czechoslovakia) Věra Suková	6	6
(New Zealand) Robert Clarke (United Kingdom) Sue Rich	2	2
(Argentina) Eduardo Soriano (United Kingdom) Carole Rosser	3	6	3
(Netherlands) Pieter van Eijsden (Netherlands) Jenny Ridderhof-Seven	6	1	6
(Australia) Geoffrey Pares (United States) Judy Alvarez	6	1	6
(United States) Frank Froehling (United States) Justina Bricka	3	6	3
Q	(United Kingdom) John Crump (United Kingdom) Ann Anderson	3	9	6
(United States) Chris Crawford (United States) Carole Caldwell	6	7	3

Third round
4	(Czechoslovakia) J Javorský (Czechoslovakia) V Suková	6	6
(Netherlands) P van Eijsden (Netherlands) J Ridderhof-Seven	1	2
(Australia) G Pares (United States) J Alvarez	6	13
Q	(United Kingdom) J Crump (United Kingdom) A Anderson	2	11

Fourth round
4	(Czechoslovakia) J Javorský (Czechoslovakia) V Suková	6	7
(Australia) G Pares (United States) J Alvarez	3	5

==== Section 4 ====
First round
(Austria) Detlev Herdy (Austria) Sonja Pachta	1	4
(United States) Dennis Ralston (United Kingdom) Ann Haydon	6	6
(United Kingdom) Humphrey Truman (United Kingdom) Christine Truman	10	3
(Japan) Osamu Ishiguro (West Germany) Karin Herich	12	6
(United Kingdom) John Maguire (United Kingdom) Frances MacLennan	3	4
(New Zealand) John McDonald (New Zealand) Judy Davidson	6	6
(Australia) Owen Davidson (Australia) Madonna Schacht	6	6
(Australia) Barry Phillips-Moore (Australia) Jill Blackman	3	4
(United Kingdom) Geoffrey Paish (United Kingdom) Pauline Roberts	6	6
(Switzerland) Jorge Paulo Lemann (Switzerland) Alice Wavre	2	1
(France) Bernard Destremau (France) Susan Chatrier	3	8
(Australia) John Fraser (South Africa) Sandra Price	6	10
(United States) Ed Rubinoff (United States) Donna Floyd
(United Kingdom) John Ward (United Kingdom) Lorna Cawthorn	w/o
(South Africa) Terry Ryan (South Africa) Marlene Gerson	6	6
(Spain) Jaime Bartrolí (Spain) Marta Pombo	3	4

Second round
(United States) D Ralston (United Kingdom) A Haydon	6	5	6
(Japan) O Ishiguro (West Germany) K Herich	4	7	3
(New Zealand) J McDonald (New Zealand) J Davidson	6	4
(Australia) O Davidson (Australia) M Schacht	8	6
(United Kingdom) G Paish (United Kingdom) P Roberts	8	6	3
(Australia) J Fraser (South Africa) S Price	10	4	6
(United States) E Rubinoff (United States) D Floyd	6	6
(South Africa) T Ryan (South Africa) M Gerson	3	4

Third round
(United States) D Ralston (United Kingdom) A Haydon	6	6
(Australia) O Davidson (Australia) M Schacht	0	2
(Australia) J Fraser (South Africa) S Price	7	7
(United States) E Rubinoff (United States) D Floyd	5	5

Fourth round
(United States) D Ralston (United Kingdom) A Haydon	6	6
(Australia) J Fraser (South Africa) S Price	3	4

=== Bottom half ===
==== Section 5 ====
First round
(United Kingdom) Billy Knight (United Kingdom) Jean Knight	6	6
(Australia) Neville Holland (Republic of Ireland) Eleanor O'Neill	3	2
(Netherlands) Willem Maris (Netherlands) Eva de Jong	9	6
(Australia) Jim Shepherd (South Africa) Heather Segal	7	4
(Spain) Emilio Martínez (Spain) Mercedes Solsona	4	1
(Norway) Thorvald Moe (Norway) Liv Paldan	6	6
(Denmark) Jørgen Ulrich (Denmark) Pia Balling	4	6	6
Q	(United Kingdom) Roy Dixon (United Kingdom) Cathy Lyon	6	2	2
(Austria) Franz Hainka (Austria) Doris Schuster	1	11
(United States) Gene Scott (West Germany) Edda Buding	6	13
(Soviet Union) Sergei Likhachev (Soviet Union) Anna Dmitrieva	6	6
(Spain) José Luis Arilla (Spain) Peggy Templer	2	4
(France) Jean Borotra (Australia) Kaye Dening	3	2
(United Kingdom) Michael Hann (United Kingdom) Caroline Yates-Bell	6	6
(Colombia) William Álvarez (Australia) Heather Ross	1	0
(United States) Gardnar Mulloy (Australia) Judy Tegart	6	6

Second round
(United Kingdom) W Knight (United Kingdom) J Knight	6	6
(Netherlands) W Maris (Netherlands) E de Jong	3	2
(Norway) T Moe (Norway) L Paldan	2	6	7
(Denmark) J Ulrich (Denmark) P Balling	6	4	5
(United States) E Scott (West Germany) E Buding	2	6	6
(Soviet Union) S Likhachev (Soviet Union) A Dmitrieva	6	3	2
(United Kingdom) M Hann (United Kingdom) C Yates-Bell	7	6
(United States) G Mulloy (Australia) J Tegart	5	3

Third round
(United Kingdom) W Knight (United Kingdom) J Knight	6	6
(Norway) T Moe (Norway) L Paldan	3	3
(United States) E Scott (West Germany) E Buding	5	6	3
(United Kingdom) M Hann (United Kingdom) C Yates-Bell	7	4	6

Fourth round
(United Kingdom) W Knight (United Kingdom) J Knight	6	6
(United Kingdom) M Hann (United Kingdom) C Yates-Bell	4	4

==== Section 6 ====
First round

Second round
(United Kingdom) Mark Cox (United Kingdom) Frances Walton	6	2	3
(United States) Rod Susman (United States) Karen Susman	4	6	6
(Australia) Martin Mulligan (United Kingdom) Rita Bentley	6	4	6
(Australia) Wayne Reid (Australia) Mary Hawton	2	6	3
(Finland) Reino Nyyssönen (Australia) Nell Hopman	5	3
(United Kingdom) Roger Taylor (United States) Darlene Hard	7	6
(New Zealand) Ian Crookenden (New Zealand) Anne Smith	1	3
3	(Australia) Neale Fraser (United States) Margaret duPont	6	6

Third round
(United States) R Susman (United States) K Susman	8	3	10
(Australia) M Mulligan (United Kingdom) R Bentley	6	6	8
(United Kingdom) R Taylor (United States) D Hard	4	4
3	(Australia) N Fraser (United States) M duPont	6	6

Fourth round
(United States) R Susman (United States) K Susman	5	7
3	(Australia) N Fraser (United States) M duPont	7	9

==== Section 7 ====
First round

Second round
(South Africa) Gordon Forbes (South Africa) Jean Forbes	7	6
Q	(Australia) Bill Bowrey (United Kingdom) Diane Tuckey	5	2
(United Kingdom) Geoff Ward (United Kingdom) Rosemary Deloford	0	2
(United Kingdom) Alan Mills (United Kingdom) Jill Mills	6	6
(Australia) Ken Fletcher (South Africa) Bernice Vukovich	3	6	9
(Socialist Federal Republic of Yugoslavia) Nikola Pilić (West Germany) Heide Schildknecht	6	2	11
(Federation of Rhodesia and Nyasaland) Basil Katz (United Kingdom) Elaine Shenton	2	1
(United States) Paul Palmer (United States) Victoria Palmer	6	6

Third round
(South Africa) G Forbes (South Africa) J Forbes	6	6
(United Kingdom) A Mills (United Kingdom) J Mills	3	2
(Socialist Federal Republic of Yugoslavia) N Pilić (West Germany) H Schildknecht	7	3	6
(United States) P Palmer (United States) V Palmer	5	6	2

Fourth round
(South Africa) G Forbes (South Africa) J Forbes	7	3	6
(Socialist Federal Republic of Yugoslavia) N Pilić (West Germany) H Schildknecht	5	6	3

==== Section 8 ====
First round

Second round
(Australia) John Newcombe (Australia) Jan Lehane	6	3	6
(United States) Donald Dell (United States) Margaret Varner	4	6	3
(Spain) Alberto Arilla (Spain) Ana María Estalella	6	6
(United Kingdom) Jimmy Tattersall (Denmark) Inge Overgaard	1	2
(India) Naresh Kumar (United Kingdom) Pat Hird	7	6	6
(United Kingdom) Howard Walton (United Kingdom) Liz Starkie	5	8	2
(New Zealand) Mark Otway (United Kingdom) Pat Roberts	3	5
1	(Australia) Fred Stolle (Australia) Lesley Turner	6	7

Third round
(Australia) J Newcombe (Australia) J Lehane	3	6	6
(Spain) A Arilla (Spain) AM Estalella	6	3	1
(India) N Kumar (United Kingdom) P Hird	2	2
1	(Australia) F Stolle (Australia) L Turner	6	6

Fourth round
(Australia) J Newcombe (Australia) J Lehane	2	2
1	(Australia) F Stolle (Australia) L Turner	6	6
