= 1962 Wimbledon Championships – Women's doubles =

Women's doubles
- 1962 Wimbledon Championships

Final
- Champions: (United States) Billie Jean Moffitt (United States) Karen Susman
- Runners-up: (South Africa) Sandra Price (South Africa) Renée Schuurman
- Score: 5–7, 6–3, 7–5

Details
- Draw: 48 (5 Q )
- Seeds: 4

Events
Singles	men	women		boys	girls
Doubles	men	women	mixed	boys	girls
← 1961 ·	Wimbledon Championships	· 1963 →

Billie Jean Moffitt and Karen Susman successfully defended their title, defeating Sandra Price and Renée Schuurman in the final, 5–7, 6–3, 7–5 to win the ladies' doubles tennis title at the 1962 Wimbledon Championships.

== Seeds ==
1. (Brazil) Maria Bueno / (United States) Darlene Hard (semifinals)
2. (United States) Billie Jean Moffitt / (United States) Karen Susman (champions)
3. (United States) Justina Bricka / (Australia) Margaret Smith (semifinals)
4. (South Africa) Sandra Price / (South Africa) Renée Schuurman (final)

Click on the seed number of a player to go to their draw section.

== Draw ==
=== Key ===
- Q = Qualifier
- WC = Wild card
- LL = Lucky loser
- Alt = Alternate
- ITF = ITF entry
- PR = Protected ranking
- SR = Special ranking
- SE = Special exempt
- JE = Junior exempt
- JR = Junior Accelerator Programme entrant
- CO = College Accelerator Programme entrant
- NG = Next Gen Accelerator Program entrant
- w/o = Walkover
- r = Retired
- d = Defaulted

=== Finals ===
Quarterfinals
1	(Brazil) Maria Bueno (United States) Darlene Hard	4	6	6
(Australia) Jan Lehane (Australia) Lesley Turner	6	2	3
4	(South Africa) Sandra Price (South Africa) Renée Schuurman	7	11
(United States) Donna Floyd (Australia) Judy Tegart	5	9
(West Germany) Edda Buding (United Kingdom) Angela Mortimer	2	3
3	(United States) Justina Bricka (Australia) Margaret Smith	6	6
(South Africa) Valerie Forbes (South Africa) Heather Segal	1	4
2	(United States) Billie Jean Moffitt (United States) Karen Susman	6	6

Semifinals
1	(Brazil) Maria Bueno (United States) Darlene Hard	3	3
4	(South Africa) Sandra Price (South Africa) Renée Schuurman	6	6
3	(United States) Justina Bricka (Australia) Margaret Smith	3	4
2	(United States) Billie Jean Moffitt (United States) Karen Susman	6	6

Final
4	(South Africa) Sandra Price (South Africa) Renée Schuurman	7	3	5
2	(United States) Billie Jean Moffitt (United States) Karen Susman	5	6	7

=== Top half ===
==== Section 1 ====
First round

Second round
1	(Brazil) Maria Bueno (United States) Darlene Hard	6	6
(France) Paule Courteix (Belgium) Mary Marechal	0	1
(Australia) Kaye Dening (Australia) Mary Hawton	6	2	3
(United States) Margaret Varner (United States) Margaret duPont	2	6	6
(Austria) Sonja Pachta (Austria) Doris Schuster	2	3
(United States) Judy Alvarez (United States) Carole Caldwell	6	6
(West Germany) Heide Schildknecht (West Germany) Almut Sturm	3	1
(Australia) Jan Lehane (Australia) Lesley Turner	6	6

Third round
1	(Brazil) M Bueno (United States) D Hard	6	1	6
(United States) M Varner (United States) M duPont	0	6	3
(United States) J Alvarez (United States) C Caldwell	4	5
(Australia) J Lehane (Australia) L Turner	6	7

Fourth round
1	(Brazil) M Bueno (United States) D Hard	4	6	6
(Australia) J Lehane (Australia) L Turner	6	2	3

==== Section 2 ====
First round
4	(South Africa) Sandra Price (South Africa) Renée Schuurman	6	6
(Spain) Pilar Barril (Italy) Roberta Beltrame	2	2
Q	(New Zealand) Patsy Belton (New Zealand) Judy Davidson	6	3
(United Kingdom) Pat Roberts (United Kingdom) Pauline Roberts	8	6
(France) Michelle Bourbonnais (Norway) Liv Paldan	2	3
(Soviet Union) Anna Dmitrieva (Italy) Francesca Gordigiani	6	6
(Spain) Carmen Coronado (Spain) Ana María Estalella	7	6	6
(United Kingdom) Rita Bentley (South Africa) Marlene Gerson	9	2	4
(Chile) Margarita Bender (Chile) Carmen Ibarra	3	1
(Italy) Silvana Lazzarino (Italy) Lea Pericoli	6	6
(United Kingdom) Ann Haydon (United Kingdom) Christine Truman	6	6
Q	(United Kingdom) Honor Clarke (United Kingdom) Jenny Young	2	4
(United Kingdom) Lorna Cawthorn (Australia) Nell Hopman	w/o
(Hungary) Zsuzsa Körmöczy (Czechoslovakia) Věra Suková
(United States) Victoria Palmer (United States) Nancy Richey	1	1
(United States) Donna Floyd (Australia) Judy Tegart	6	6

Second round
4	(South Africa) S Price (South Africa) R Schuurman	6	6
(United Kingdom) P Roberts (United Kingdom) P Roberts	2	4
(Soviet Union) A Dmitrieva (Italy) F Gordigiani	3	4
(Spain) C Coronado (Spain) AM Estalella	6	6
(Italy) S Lazzarino (Italy) L Pericoli	8	6
(United Kingdom) A Haydon (United Kingdom) C Truman	6	3
(Hungary) Z Körmöczy (Czechoslovakia) V Suková	2	2
(United States) D Floyd (Australia) J Tegart	6	6

Third round
4	(South Africa) S Price (South Africa) R Schuurman	6	6
(Spain) C Coronado (Spain) AM Estalella	4	4
(Italy) S Lazzarino (Italy) L Pericoli	0	4
(United States) D Floyd (Australia) J Tegart	6	6

Fourth round
4	(South Africa) S Price (South Africa) R Schuurman	7	11
(United States) D Floyd (Australia) J Tegart	5	9

=== Bottom half ===
==== Section 3 ====
First round
(United Kingdom) Deidre Catt (United Kingdom) Liz Starkie	2	4
(West Germany) Edda Buding (United Kingdom) Angela Mortimer	6	6
Q	(United Kingdom) Jane Rushton (United Kingdom) Judy Tee	4	6	3
Q	(Australia) Heather Ross (Australia) Gwen Thiele	6	4	6
(South Africa) Jean Forbes (South Africa) Bernice Vukovich	6	6
(Australia) Margaret Hellyer (Belgium) Christiane Mercelis	3	2
(United Kingdom) Pat Hird (United Kingdom) Caroline Yates-Bell	6	3	4
(Italy) Lucia Bassi (Italy) Maria Teresa Riedl	0	6	6
Q	(United Kingdom) Hazel Cheadle (United Kingdom) Margaret O'Donnell	6	6
(Denmark) Pia Balling (Spain) Peggy Templer	3	3
(United Kingdom) Valerie Clark (United Kingdom) Elaine Shenton	3	2
(Australia) Jill Blackman (France) Rosie Darmon	6	6
(West Germany) Karin Herich (Hungary) Márta Peterdy-Wolf	6	3	9
(United Kingdom) Rosemary Deloford (United Kingdom) Jill Mills	4	6	7
(Denmark) Inge Overgaard (Denmark) Ulla Rise	2	1
3	(United States) Justina Bricka (Australia) Margaret Smith	6	6

Second round
(West Germany) E Buding (United Kingdom) A Mortimer	6	6
(Australia) H Ross (Australia) G Thiele	3	3
(South Africa) J Forbes (South Africa) B Vukovich	6	6
(Italy) L Bassi (Italy) MT Riedl	0	0
Q	(United Kingdom) H Cheadle (United Kingdom) M O'Donnell	5	3
(Australia) J Blackman (France) R Darmon	7	6
(West Germany) K Herich (Hungary) M Peterdy-Wolf	2	1
3	(United States) J Bricka (Australia) M Smith	6	6

Third round
(West Germany) E Buding (United Kingdom) A Mortimer	6	6
(South Africa) J Forbes (South Africa) B Vukovich	4	2
(Australia) J Blackman (France) R Darmon	4	2
3	(United States) J Bricka (Australia) M Smith	6	6

Fourth round
(West Germany) E Buding (United Kingdom) A Mortimer	2	3
3	(United States) J Bricka (Australia) M Smith	6	6

==== Section 4 ====
First round

Second round
(France) Susan Chatrier (France) Florence de la Courtie	4	3
(South Africa) Valerie Forbes (South Africa) Heather Segal	6	6
(West Germany) Renate Ostermann (West Germany) Helga Schultze	10	4
(Netherlands) Eva de Jong (Netherlands) Jenny Ridderhof-Seven	12	6
(Sweden) Katarina Frendelius (Sweden) Ulla Sandulf	3	6	6
(Spain) Marta Pombo (Spain) Mercedes Solsona	6	2	2
(Australia) Robyn Ebbern (Australia) Madonna Schacht	2	1
2	(United States) Billie Jean Moffitt (United States) Karen Susman	6	6

Third round
(South Africa) V Forbes (South Africa) H Segal	7	4	8
(Netherlands) E de Jong (Netherlands) J Ridderhof-Seven	5	6	6
(Sweden) K Frendelius (Sweden) U Sandulf	2	0
2	(United States) BJ Moffitt (United States) K Susman	6	6

Fourth round
(South Africa) V Forbes (South Africa) H Segal	1	4
2	(United States) BJ Moffitt (United States) K Susman	6	6
