= 1965 Wimbledon Championships – Mixed doubles =

Mixed doubles
- 1965 Wimbledon Championships

Final
- Champions: (Australia) Ken Fletcher (Australia) Margaret Smith
- Runners-up: (Australia) Tony Roche (Australia) Judy Tegart
- Score: 12–10, 6–3

Details
- Draw: 80 (5 Q )
- Seeds: 4

Events
Singles	men	women		boys	girls
Doubles	men	women	mixed	boys	girls
← 1964 ·	Wimbledon Championships	· 1966 →

Fred Stolle and Lesley Turner were the defending champions, but lost in the semifinals to Tony Roche and Judy Tegart.

Ken Fletcher and Margaret Smith defeated Roche and Tegart in the final, 12–10, 6–3 to win the mixed doubles tennis title at the 1965 Wimbledon Championships.

== Seeds ==
1. (Australia) Fred Stolle / (Australia) Lesley Turner (semifinals)
2. (Australia) Ken Fletcher / (Australia) Margaret Smith (champions)
3. (United States) Dennis Ralston / (Brazil) Maria Bueno (semifinals)
4. (Australia) Neale Fraser / (West Germany) Helga Schultze (second round)

Click on the seed number of a player to go to their draw section.

== Draw ==
Key

- Q = Qualifier
- WC = Wild card
- LL = Lucky loser
- Alt = Alternate
- ITF = ITF entry
- PR = Protected ranking
- SR = Special ranking
- SE = Special exempt
- JE = Junior exempt
- JR = Junior Accelerator Programme entrant
- CO = College Accelerator Programme entrant
- NG = Next Gen Accelerator Program entrant
- w/o = Walkover
- r = Retired
- d = Defaulted

=== Finals ===
Quarterfinals
1	(Australia) Fred Stolle (Australia) Lesley Turner	9	3	6
(France) Jean-Claude Barclay (France) Françoise Dürr	7	6	2
(United States) Donald Dell (United States) Nancy Richey	7	4
(Australia) Tony Roche (Australia) Judy Tegart	9	6
(United States) Clark Graebner (United States) Carole Graebner	2	4
3	(United States) Dennis Ralston (Brazil) Maria Bueno	6	6
(United States) Gene Scott (United States) Kathy Blake	4	4
2	(Australia) Ken Fletcher (Australia) Margaret Smith	6	6

Semifinals
1	(Australia) Fred Stolle (Australia) Lesley Turner	3	9
(Australia) Tony Roche (Australia) Judy Tegart	6	11
3	(United States) Dennis Ralston (Brazil) Maria Bueno	5	4
2	(Australia) Ken Fletcher (Australia) Margaret Smith	7	6

Final
(Australia) Tony Roche (Australia) Judy Tegart	10	3
2	(Australia) Ken Fletcher (Australia) Margaret Smith	12	6

=== Top half ===
==== Section 1 ====
First round

Second round
1	(Australia) Fred Stolle (Australia) Lesley Turner	7	6
(United Kingdom) Harry Matheson (United Kingdom) Carole Rosser	5	0
(United Kingdom) Roger Ambrose (United Kingdom) Sue Ambrose
(Italy) Alberto Lazzarino (Italy) Silvana Lazzarino	w/o
(South Africa) David Phillips (Rhodesia) Pat Walkden	6	6
(Republic of Ireland) Michael Hickey (Republic of Ireland) Eleanor O'Neill	2	2
(Australia) Bill Bowrey (Australia) Gail Sherriff	7	2	4
(United States) Chauncey Steele (United States) Mary-Ann Eisel	5	6	6

Third round
1	(Australia) F Stolle (Australia) L Turner	6	6
(United Kingdom) R Ambrose (United Kingdom) S Ambrose	1	0
(South Africa) D Phillips (Rhodesia) P Walkden	3	6	4
(United States) C Steele (United States) M-A Eisel	6	3	6

Fourth round
1	(Australia) F Stolle (Australia) L Turner	6	6
(United States) C Steele (United States) M-A Eisel	2	2

==== Section 2 ====
First round

Second round
Q	(Mexico) Vicente Zarazúa (Mexico) Elena Subirats	3	6	6
(South Africa) Keith Diepraam (South Africa) Pam Diepraam	6	4	3
(Australia) Ray Keldie (United Kingdom) Mary McAnally	7	9	6
(United Kingdom) Mark Cox (United Kingdom) Alison Stroud	5	11	2
(France) Daniel Contet (France) Janine Lieffrig	6	3	2
(France) Jean-Claude Barclay (France) Françoise Dürr	4	6	6
(United Kingdom) Billy Knight (United Kingdom) Jean Knight	3	6	6
(New Zealand) Mark Otway (United Kingdom) Liz Starkie	6	2	0

Third round
Q	(Mexico) V Zarazúa (Mexico) E Subirats	12	6
(Australia) R Keldie (United Kingdom) M McAnally	10	2
(France) J-C Barclay (France) F Dürr	6	3	6
(United Kingdom) W Knight (United Kingdom) J Knight	4	6	3

Fourth round
Q	(Mexico) V Zarazúa (Mexico) E Subirats	6	2
(France) J-C Barclay (France) F Dürr	8	6

==== Section 3 ====
First round

Second round
4	(Australia) Neale Fraser (West Germany) Helga Schultze	5	7	3
(United States) Donald Dell (United States) Nancy Richey	7	5	6
(South Africa) Ray Moore (South Africa) Esmé Emmanuel	6	7
(Australia) Ray Ruffels (Australia) Jill Blackman	3	5
(United Kingdom) Stanley Matthews (United Kingdom) Robin Lloyd
(Netherlands) Jan Hajer (Netherlands) Jenny Ridderhof-Seven	w/o
(Belgium) Claude De Gronckel (Belgium) Christiane Mercelis	7	8	2
(South Africa) Colin Zeeman (Australia) Carol Sherriff	9	6	6

Third round
(United States) D Dell (United States) N Richey	5	6	6
(South Africa) R Moore (South Africa) E Emmanuel	7	2	4
(United Kingdom) S Matthews (United Kingdom) R Lloyd	5	2
(South Africa) C Zeeman (Australia) C Sherriff	7	6

Fourth round
(United States) D Dell (United States) N Richey	7	8
(South Africa) C Zeeman (Australia) C Sherriff	5	6

==== Section 4 ====
First round
(Spain) Juan Gisbert (Spain) Marta Pombo Pereda	1	6	3
(Australia) Bob Carmichael (Australia) Trish McClenaughan	6	3	6
(West Germany) Ingo Buding (West Germany) Edda Buding	6	6	6
(Australia) Jimmy Moore (Australia) Fay Toyne	1	8	2
Q	(United Kingdom) Colin McHugo (United Kingdom) Wendy Hall	11	4
LL	(Australia) JC Fletcher (United Kingdom) Valerie Clark	13	6
(Chile) Ernesto Aguirre (Spain) Ana María Estalella	0	6	6
(Spain) José Luis Arilla (France) Michelle Boulle	6	1	5
(United Kingdom) Clay Iles (Australia) Dorothy Whitely	6	5	7
Q	(Chile) Jaime Pinto Bravo (Netherlands) Elsie Spruyt	2	7	9
(United States) Steve Tidball (United States) Tory Fretz	5	7
(Australia) Tony Roche (Australia) Judy Tegart	7	9
(United Kingdom) Geoff Bluett (United Kingdom) Rita Bentley	7	6
(India) Naresh Kumar (Italy) Francesca Gordigiani	5	1
(Chile) Patricio Rodríguez (United States) Alice Tym	3	0
(United Kingdom) Gerald Battrick (United Kingdom) Winnie Shaw	6	6

Second round
(Australia) R Carmichael (Australia) P McClenaughan	2	4
(West Germany) I Buding (West Germany) E Buding	6	6
LL	(Australia) JC Fletcher (United Kingdom) V Clark	4	8	8
(Chile) E Aguirre (Spain) AM Estalella	6	6	6
Q	(Chile) J Pinto Bravo (Netherlands) E Spruyt	4	9	9
(Australia) A Roche (Australia) J Tegart	6	7	11
(United Kingdom) G Bluett (United Kingdom) R Bentley	5	6	6
(United Kingdom) G Battrick (United Kingdom) W Shaw	7	4	8

Third round
(West Germany) I Buding (West Germany) E Buding	3	6	6
LL	(Australia) JC Fletcher (United Kingdom) V Clark	6	2	3
(Australia) A Roche (Australia) J Tegart	7	6
(United Kingdom) G Battrick (United Kingdom) W Shaw	5	3

Fourth round
(West Germany) I Buding (West Germany) E Buding	6	3	4
(Australia) A Roche (Australia) J Tegart	4	6	6

=== Bottom half ===
==== Section 5 ====
First round
(South Africa) Bob Maud (South Africa) Glenda Swan	6	6
(Australia) Bob Hewitt (South Africa) Dalaille Hewitt	2	4
(Greece) Nicholas Kalogeropoulos (United States) Carol-Ann Prosen	6	9	6
(Australia) Colin Stubs (United States) Mary Habicht	3	11	2
Q	(United Kingdom) Geoff Stubbs (United Kingdom) Margaret O'Donnell	2	3
(Soviet Union) Toomas Leius (Soviet Union) Anna Dmitrieva	6	6
(South Africa) Ray Weedon (United Kingdom) Nell Truman	6	6
(Italy) Sergio Tacchini (Italy) Pierrette Tacchini	2	1
(South Africa) Rohan Summers (South Africa) Heather Segal	1	3
(Chile) Omar Pabst (France) Jacqueline Rees-Lewis	6	6
(France) François Jauffret (France) Christiane Spinoza	2	8	3
(United Kingdom) Michael Hann (United Kingdom) Virginia Wade	6	6	6
(United States) Clark Graebner (United States) Carole Graebner	6	6	6
(United States) Roger Werksman (Canada) Vicki Berner	2	8	3
(Japan) Ichizo Konishi (France) Isabelle de Lansalut	6	6
(Republic of Ireland) Derek Arthurs (Republic of Ireland) Geraldine Houlihan	1	4

Second round
(South Africa) R Maud (South Africa) G Swan	4	6	6
(Greece) N Kalogeropoulos (United States) C-A Prosen	6	3	4
(Soviet Union) T Leius (Soviet Union) A Dmitrieva	2	3
(South Africa) R Weedon (United Kingdom) E Truman	6	6
(Chile) O Pabst (France) J Rees-Lewis	2	4
(United Kingdom) M Hann (United Kingdom) V Wade	6	6
(United States) C Graebner (United States) C Graebner	6	6
(Japan) I Konishi (France) I de Lansalut	1	1

Third round
(South Africa) R Maud (South Africa) G Swan	6	6
(South Africa) R Weedon (United Kingdom) E Truman	0	2
(United Kingdom) M Hann (United Kingdom) V Wade	2	1
(United States) C Graebner (United States) C Graebner	6	6

Fourth round
(South Africa) R Maud (South Africa) G Swan	1	3
(United States) C Graebner (United States) C Graebner	6	6

==== Section 6 ====
First round

Second round
(Australia) Brent Larkham (United Kingdom) Ann Owen	3	5
(Australia) Doug Kelso (United Kingdom) Pat Roberts	6	7
(Australia) Bob Howe (Argentina) Norma Baylon	6	6
(Australia) Gary Baulch (United Kingdom) Heather Allen	4	3
(United Kingdom) Keith Wooldridge (United Kingdom) Joyce Williams	11	6
(France) Michel Leclercq (France) Monique Salfati	9	3
(South Africa) Cliff Drysdale (South Africa) Vivienne Wiggill	w/o
4	(United States) Dennis Ralston (Brazil) Maria Bueno

Third round
(Australia) D Kelso (United Kingdom) P Roberts	11	5	6
(Australia) R Howe (Argentina) N Baylon	9	7	2
(United Kingdom) K Wooldridge (United Kingdom) J Williams	1	4
4	(United States) D Ralston (Brazil) M Bueno	6	6

Fourth round
(Australia) D Kelso (United Kingdom) P Roberts	0	2
4	(United States) D Ralston (Brazil) M Bueno	6	6

==== Section 7 ====
First round

Second round
(Brazil) José Edison Mandarino (Spain) Carmen Coronado	4	6	5
(Australia) John Cooper (United States) Jane Albert	6	3	7
(United Kingdom) Alan Mills (United Kingdom) Jill Mills	6	2	6
(Rhodesia) Roger Dowdeswell (Rhodesia) Jenny Morris	4	6	1
(United Kingdom) John Barrett (United Kingdom) Angela Mortimer	4	4
(United States) Gene Scott (United States) Kathy Blake	6	6
(Sweden) Kenneth Andersson (Sweden) Katarina Bartholdson	6	2	2
(United States) Frank Froehling (United States) Justina Bricka	2	6	6

Third round
(Australia) J Cooper (United States) J Albert	2	6	7
(United Kingdom) A Mills (United Kingdom) J Mills	6	1	9
(United States) E Scott (United States) K Blake	6	3	9
(United States) F Froehling (United States) J Bricka	2	6	7

Fourth round
(United Kingdom) A Mills (United Kingdom) J Mills	12	3
(United States) E Scott (United States) K Blake	14	6

==== Section 8 ====
First round

Second round
(Venezuela) Isaías Pimentel (Sweden) Ingrid Löfdahl	6	3	2
(United Kingdom) Humphrey Truman (United Kingdom) Christine Truman	3	6	6
(Australia) John Sharpe (Australia) Robin Lesh	12	9	6
(Netherlands) Tom Okker (Netherlands) Trudy Groenman	14	7	4
(New Zealand) Lew Gerrard (Netherlands) Betty Stöve	3	1
(Australia) Owen Davidson (Australia) Madonna Schacht	6	6
Q	(United Kingdom) GM Price (United Kingdom) Vicky Rees	3	0
2	(Australia) Ken Fletcher (Australia) Margaret Smith	6	6

Third round
(United Kingdom) H Truman (United Kingdom) C Truman	2	6
(Australia) J Sharpe (Australia) R Lesh	6	8
(Australia) O Davidson (Australia) M Schacht	3	1
2	(Australia) K Fletcher (Australia) M Smith	6	6

Fourth round
(Australia) J Sharpe (Australia) R Lesh	6	2	2
2	(Australia) K Fletcher (Australia) M Smith	3	6	6
