= 1962 French Championships – Women's singles =

Women's singles
- 1962 French Championships

Final
- Champion: (Australia) Margaret Smith
- Runner-up: (Australia) Lesley Turner
- Score: 6–3, 3–6, 7–5

Details
- Seeds: 16

Events
Singles	men	women
Doubles	men	women
← 1961 ·	French Championships	· 1963 →

Second-seeded Margaret Smith defeated Lesley Turner 6–3, 3–6, 7–5 in the final to win the women's singles tennis title at the 1962 French Championships.

== Seeds ==
The seeded players are listed below. Margaret Smith is the champion; others show the round in which they were eliminated.

1. (United Kingdom) Ann Haydon (semifinals)
2. (Australia) Margaret Smith (champion)
3. (United Kingdom) Christine Truman (fourth round)
4. (Hungary) Zsuzsi Körmöczy (fourth round)
5. (South Africa) Sandra Price (quarterfinals)
6. (South Africa) Renée Schuurman (semifinals)
7. (West Germany) Edda Buding (quarterfinals)
8. (Australia) Jan Lehane (quarterfinals)
9. (United Kingdom) Liz Starkie (fourth round)
10. (United Kingdom) Deidre Catt (third round)
11. (United States) Justina Bricka (fourth round)
12. (Italy) Maria-Teresa Riedl (third round)
13. (Australia) Lesley Turner (finalist)
14. (Italy) Lea Pericoli (third round)
15. (Spain) Pilar Barril (second round)
16. (Australia) Jill Blackman (fourth round)

== Draw ==
=== Key ===
- Q = Qualifier
- WC = Wild card
- LL = Lucky loser
- r = Retired

=== Finals ===
Quarterfinals
1	(United Kingdom) Ann Haydon	6	6
8	(Australia) Jan Lehane	4	1
13	(Australia) Lesley Turner	8	6
5	(South Africa) Sandra Price	6	3
6	(South Africa) Renée Schuurman	6	6
(United States) Donna Floyd	3	1
7	(West Germany) Edda Buding	2	4
2	(Australia) Margaret Smith	6	6

Semifinals
1	(United Kingdom) Ann Haydon	4	7	3
13	(Australia) Lesley Turner	6	5	6
6	(South Africa) Renée Schuurman	6	3
2	(Australia) Margaret Smith	8	6

Finals
13	(Australia) Lesley Turner	3	6	5
2	(Australia) Margaret Smith	6	3	7

=== Earlier rounds ===
==== Section 1 ====
First round

Second round
1	(United Kingdom) Haydon
(Spain) Solsona
(New Zealand) Rich	1	0
(France) Boulle	6	6
(Italy) Lazzarino	6	6
(France) Galtier	2	2
(New Zealand) Green	4	2
16	(Australia) Blackman	6	6

Third round
1	(United Kingdom) Haydon	6	6
(France) Boulle	1	0
(Italy) Lazzarino	2	3
16	(Australia) Blackman	6	6

Fourth round
1	(United Kingdom) Haydon	6	6
16	(Australia) Blackman	2	2

==== Section 2 ====
First round

Second round
8	(Australia) Lehane	6	6
(France) Bourbonnais	2	0
(France) De Lansalut	1	6	1
(West Germany) Schultze	6	3	6
9	(United Kingdom) Starkie	6	6
(Australia) Thiele	1	2
(Australia) Hopman	6	3
(New Zealand) Terry	8	6

Third round
8	(Australia) Lehane	6	8
(West Germany) Schultze	4	6
9	(United Kingdom) Starkie	6	6
(New Zealand) Terry	0	0

Fourth round
8	(Australia) Lehane	6	6
9	(United Kingdom) Starkie	4	2

==== Section 3 ====
First round
(France) Seghers	4	4
(Italy) Gordigiani	6	6
(France) Billaz	1	2
(United States) Arnold	6	6
13	(Australia) Turner	6	6
(France) Courteix	0	1
(France) Langanay	8	2	2
(South Africa) Forbes	6	6	6
(Czechoslovakia) Suková	6	6
(France) Galtier	3	0
(France) Kermina	3	6	1
(Republic of Ireland) O'Neill	6	3	6

Second round
4	(Hungary) Körmöczy	6	6
(Sweden) Lundqvist	0	1
(Italy) Gordigiani	2	3
(United States) Arnold	6	6
13	(Australia) Turner	6	6
(South Africa) Forbes	1	3
(Czechoslovakia) Suková	6	6
(Republic of Ireland) O'Neill	0	3

Third round
4	(Hungary) Körmöczy	6	6
(United States) Arnold	2	2
13	(Australia) Turner	7	6
(Czechoslovakia) Suková	5	4

Fourth round
4	(Hungary) Körmöczy	6	2	2
13	(Australia) Turner	3	6	6

==== Section 4 ====
First round
5	(South Africa) Price	6	6
(France) Bucaille	1	0
(France) Salfati	5	3
(United Kingdom) Maclennan	7	6
(France) Morales	3	4
(United Kingdom) Cawthorn	6	6
(Chile) Ibarra	0	0
(Belgium) Mercelis	6	6
12	(Italy) Riedl	6	6
(France) Salvet	0	2
(Hungary) Peterdy-Wolf
(Australia) Schacht
(South Africa) Gerson	3	1
(France) Le Besnerais	6	6
(United Kingdom) Bentley	1	2
(France) Dürr	6	6

Second round
5	(South Africa) Price	6	6
(United Kingdom) Maclennan	1	3
(United Kingdom) Cawthorn	0	3
(Belgium) Mercelis	6	6
12	(Italy) Riedl	8	2	6
(Australia) Schacht	6	6	3
(France) Le Besnerais	3	1
(France) Dürr	6	6

Third round
5	(South Africa) Price
(Belgium) Mercelis
12	(Italy) Riedl	4	2
(France) Dürr	6	6

Fourth round
5	(South Africa) Price	7	6
(France) Dürr	5	3

==== Section 5 ====
First round
(France) Pierval	3	6
(United Kingdom) Durose	6	8
(Chile) Bender	0	1
(France) De La Courtie	6	6
(West Germany) Ostermann
(Spain) Coronado
11	(United States) Bricka	6	6
(France) Chatrier	2	4
(France) Courteix
(Australia) Tegart
(France) Nay	5	3
(Italy) Bassi	7	6
(France) Coste	2	5
(Australia) Hellyer	6	7
(France) Berson	1	1
6	(South Africa) Schuurman	6	6

Second round
(United Kingdom) Durose	3	2
(France) De La Courtie	6	6
(Spain) Coronado	3	2
11	(United States) Bricka	6	6
(Australia) Tegart	12	6
(Italy) Bassi	10	3
(Australia) Hellyer	4	3
6	(South Africa) Schuurman	6	6

Third round
(France) De La Courtie	4	3
11	(United States) Bricka	6	6
(Australia) Tegart	4	4
6	(South Africa) Schuurman	6	6

Fourth round
11	(United States) Bricka	2	3
6	(South Africa) Schuurman	6	6

==== Section 6 ====
First round
(France) Huve
(United States) Floyd
(Belgium) Maréchal	5	3
(France) Darmon	7	6
(France) Burel	2	2
(Australia) Dening	6	6
(France) Seghers	2	0
14	(Italy) Pericoli	6	6
(New Zealand) Belton	2	3
(Australia) Ebbern	6	6
(Egypt) Abbas	5	0
(South Africa) Segal	7	6
(United Kingdom) Mills
(France) Nenot

Second round
(United States) Floyd	6	6
(France) Darmon	4	4
(Australia) Dening	6	2	2
14	(Italy) Pericoli	3	6	6
(Australia) Ebbern	6	3	4
(South Africa) Segal	3	6	6
(France) Nenot	7	2	2
3	(United Kingdom) Truman	5	6	6

Third round
(United States) Floyd	9	6
14	(Italy) Pericoli	7	4
(South Africa) Segal	2	8	3
3	(United Kingdom) Truman	6	6	6

Fourth round
(United States) Floyd	6	6	6
3	(United Kingdom) Truman	8	2	4

==== Section 7 ====
First round

Second round
(Australia) Ross	5	6
(France) Lieffrig	7	8
(France) Varin	0	0	r
10	(United Kingdom) Catt	6	1
(France) Wild	4	0
(Italy) Beltrame	6	6
(New Zealand) Davidson	6	6	2
7	(West Germany) Buding	8	2	6

Third round
(France) Lieffrig	2	10	6
10	(United Kingdom) Catt	6	8	4
(Italy) Beltrame	0	0
7	(West Germany) Buding	6	6

Fourth round
(France) Lieffrig	2	2
7	(West Germany) Buding	6	6

==== Section 8 ====
First round

Second round
(New Zealand) Smith	2	3
(Australia) Hawton	6	6
(France) Rouchon	6	0	6
15	(Spain) Barril	4	6	1
(France) Repoux	3	2
(South Africa) Forbes	6	6
(Austria) Leyrer
2	(Australia) Smith

Third round
(Australia) Hawton	6	8
(France) Rouchon	4	6
(South Africa) Forbes	0	2
2	(Australia) Smith	6	6

Fourth round
(Australia) Hawton	1	3
2	(Australia) Smith	6	6

Preceded by 1962 Australian Championships – Women's singles	Grand Slam women's singles	Succeeded by 1962 Wimbledon Championships – Women's singles
