= 1962 Wimbledon Championships – Women's singles =

Women's singles
- 1962 Wimbledon Championships

Final
- Champion: (United States) Karen Susman
- Runner-up: (Czechoslovakia) Věra Suková
- Score: 6–4, 6–4

Details
- Draw: 96 (10 Q )
- Seeds: 8

Events
Singles	men	women		boys	girls
Doubles	men	women	mixed	boys	girls
← 1961 ·	Wimbledon Championships	· 1963 →

Karen Susman defeated Věra Suková in the final, 6–4, 6–4 to win the ladies' singles tennis title at the 1962 Wimbledon Championships. Angela Mortimer was the defending champion, but lost in the fourth round to Suková. Top seed Margaret Smith had a bye into the second round, where she lost her first match to Billie-Jean Moffit. It was the first time in Grand Slam history that the women's top seed had lost her opening match, albeit in the second round.

== Seeds ==
1. (Australia) Margaret Smith (second round)
2. (United States) Darlene Hard (quarterfinals)
3. (Brazil) Maria Bueno (semifinals)
4. (South Africa) Renée Schuurman (quarterfinals)
5. (United Kingdom) Ann Haydon (semifinals)
6. (United Kingdom) Angela Mortimer (fourth round)
7. (Australia) Lesley Turner (quarterfinals)
8. (United States) Karen Susman (champion)

Click on the seed number of a player to go to their draw section.

== Draw ==
=== Key ===
- Q = Qualifier
- WC = Wild card
- LL = Lucky loser
- Alt = Alternate
- SE = Special exempt
- PR = Protected ranking
- ITF = ITF entry
- JE = Junior exempt
- w/o = Walkover
- r = Retired
- d = Defaulted
- SR = Special ranking

=== Finals ===
Quarterfinals
(United States) Billie Jean Moffitt	3	1
5	(United Kingdom) Ann Haydon	6	6
4	(South Africa) Renée Schuurman	4	4
8	(United States) Karen Susman	6	6
7	(Australia) Lesley Turner	6	4	2
3	(Brazil) Maria Bueno	2	6	6
(Czechoslovakia) Věra Suková	6	6
2	(United States) Darlene Hard	4	3

Semifinals
5	(United Kingdom) Ann Haydon	6	1
8	(United States) Karen Susman	8	6
3	(Brazil) Maria Bueno	4	3
(Czechoslovakia) Věra Suková	6	6

Final
8	(United States) Karen Susman	6	6
(Czechoslovakia) Věra Suková	4	4

=== Top half ===
==== Section 1 ====
First round

Second round
1	(Australia) Margaret Smith	6	3	5
(United States) Billie Jean Moffitt	1	6	7
(United States) Carole Caldwell	4	6	8
(France) Florence de la Courtie	6	2	6
(West Germany) Almut Sturm	6	4	6
(United States) Mimi Arnold	0	6	3
Q	(New Zealand) Patsy Belton	1	0
(Austria) Sonja Pachta	6	6

Third round
(United States) BJ Moffitt	7	6
(United States) C Caldwell	5	3
(West Germany) A Sturm	4	6	1
(Austria) S Pachta	6	2	6

Fourth round
(United States) BJ Moffitt	6	6
(Austria) S Pachta	1	2

==== Section 2 ====
First round

Second round
5	(United Kingdom) Ann Haydon	6	6
(Italy) Silvana Lazzarino	1	2
(Australia) Margaret Hellyer	2	6	6
(South Africa) Sandra Price	6	1	8
(United States) Victoria Palmer	6	6
(Spain) Pilar Barril	1	1
(Australia) Robyn Ebbern	6	6
Q	(United Kingdom) Jean Knight	0	0

Third round
5	(United Kingdom) A Haydon	6	6
(South Africa) S Price	4	4
(United States) V Palmer	2	6	7
(Australia) R Ebbern	6	0	5

Fourth round
5	(United Kingdom) A Haydon	6	6
(United States) V Palmer	2	2

==== Section 3 ====
First round
4	(South Africa) Renée Schuurman	6	6
(United Kingdom) Frances MacLennan	0	4
(United Kingdom) Pat Roberts	2	3
(United Kingdom) Pauline Roberts	6	6
(New Zealand) Anne Smith	7	8	3
(United States) Judy Alvarez	9	6	6
(France) Paule Courteix	3	1
(United States) Justina Bricka	6	6
(United Kingdom) Rita Bentley	6	6
(United Kingdom) Carole Rosser	3	2
(United Kingdom) Rosemary Deloford	6	5	5
(Hungary) Márta Peterdy-Wolf	4	7	7
(Belgium) Christiane Mercelis	6	5	0
(Australia) Jill Blackman	2	7	6
(Australia) Madonna Schacht	7	6
(United Kingdom) Caroline Yates-Bell	5	2

Second round
4	(South Africa) R Schuurman	6	6
(United Kingdom) P Roberts	2	2
(United States) J Alvarez	4	3
(United States) J Bricka	6	6
(United Kingdom) R Bentley	6	6
(Hungary) M Peterdy-Wolf	1	3
(Australia) J Blackman	3	8	5
(Australia) M Schacht	6	6	7

Third round
4	(South Africa) R Schuurman	2	6	6
(United States) J Bricka	6	1	4
(United Kingdom) R Bentley	4	1
(Australia) M Schacht	6	6

Fourth round
4	(South Africa) R Schuurman	5	6	6
(Australia) M Schacht	7	4	1

==== Section 4 ====
First round
8	(United States) Karen Susman	6	6
(Spain) Ana María Estalella	2	1
(Italy) Maria Teresa Riedl	2	6
(United Kingdom) Pat Hird	6	8
Q	(United Kingdom) Hazel Cheadle	1	1
(United Kingdom) Liz Starkie	6	6
(United States) Gwyn Thomas
(United Kingdom) Frances Walton	w/o
Q	(United Kingdom) Virginia Wade	4	6	6
(United States) Pat Edrich	6	4	2
(United Kingdom) Alison Stroud	4	1
(Australia) Judy Tegart	6	6
(South Africa) Valerie Forbes	6	6
Q	(United Kingdom) Ann McAlpine	1	1
(West Germany) Heide Schildknecht	6	12
(United Kingdom) Robin Blakelock	1	10

Second round
8	(United States) K Susman	8	6
(United Kingdom) P Hird	6	4
(United Kingdom) E Starkie	5	6	6
(United States) G Thomas	7	4	2
Q	(United Kingdom) V Wade	6	3	1
(Australia) J Tegart	4	6	6
(South Africa) V Forbes	6	6
(West Germany) H Schildknecht	2	2

Third round
8	(United States) K Susman	7	10
(United Kingdom) E Starkie	5	8
(Australia) J Tegart	6	6
(South Africa) V Forbes	3	3

Fourth round
8	(United States) K Susman	6	6
(Australia) J Tegart	4	2

=== Bottom half ===
==== Section 5 ====
First round
Q	(United Kingdom) Jenny Wagstaff	5	1
(South Africa) Jean Forbes	7	6
(Switzerland) Alice Wavre	1	3
(Spain) Carmen Coronado	6	6
Q	(Republic of Ireland) Eleanor O'Neill	3	1
(Italy) Lucia Bassi	6	6
(United Kingdom) Lorna Cawthorn	2	3
(United Kingdom) Margaret Lee	6	6
(United States) Margaret duPont	2	4
(United Kingdom) Christine Truman	6	6
(Denmark) Inge Overgaard	4	0
(New Zealand) Ethne Green	6	6
Q	(South Africa) Marlene Gerson	5	3
(Australia) Kaye Dening	7	6
(United Kingdom) Jill Mills	4	1
7	(Australia) Lesley Turner	6	6

Second round
(South Africa) J Forbes	6	6
(Spain) C Coronado	3	1
(Italy) L Bassi	6	4	6
(United Kingdom) M Lee	1	6	4
(United Kingdom) C Truman	6	6
(New Zealand) E Green	1	0
(Australia) K Dening	4	1
7	(Australia) L Turner	6	6

Third round
(South Africa) J Forbes	6	6
(Italy) L Bassi	3	3
(United Kingdom) C Truman	5	4
7	(Australia) L Turner	7	6

Fourth round
(South Africa) J Forbes	1	2
7	(Australia) Turner	6	6

==== Section 6 ====
First round
(Australia) Heather Ross	6	3	1
(Australia) Mary Hawton	3	6	6
(United States) Nancy Richey	11	10
(United States) Donna Floyd	9	8
(Hungary) Zsuzsa Körmöczy	2	6	7
(France) Susan Chatrier	6	4	5
(South Africa) Bernice Vukovich	2	6	4
(United Kingdom) Deidre Catt	6	4	6
(Soviet Union) Anna Dmitrieva	6	6
(United Kingdom) Carol Webb	1	2
Q	(West Germany) Renate Ostermann	8	6
(West Germany) Karin Herich	6	2
(Italy) Francesca Gordigiani	2	3
(West Germany) Edda Buding	6	6
(United States) Margaret Varner	3	4
3	(Brazil) Maria Bueno	6	6

Second round
(Australia) M Hawton	5	5
(United States) N Richey	7	7
(Hungary) Z Körmöczy	5	1
(United Kingdom) D Catt	7	6
(Soviet Union) A Dmitrieva	8	5	7
Q	(West Germany) R Ostermann	6	7	5
(West Germany) E Buding	4	6	3
3	(Brazil) M Bueno	6	4	6

Third round
(United States) N Richey	5	6
(United Kingdom) D Catt	7	8
(Soviet Union) A Dmitrieva	6	1	1
3	(Brazil) M Bueno	3	6	6

Fourth round
(United Kingdom) D Catt	2	4
3	(Brazil) M Bueno	6	6

==== Section 7 ====
First round

Second round
(Austria) Doris Schuster	1	3
(Czechoslovakia) Věra Suková	6	6
(United States) Carole Ann Loop	3	1
(Australia) Jan Lehane	6	6
(New Zealand) Judy Davidson	6	8
(France) Michelle Bourbonnais	2	6
Q	(United Kingdom) Margaret Grace	2	2
6	(United Kingdom) Angela Mortimer	6	6

Third round
(Czechoslovakia) V Suková	8	6
(Australia) J Lehane	6	3
(New Zealand) J Davidson	1	1
6	(United Kingdom) A Mortimer	6	6

Fourth round
(Czechoslovakia) V Suková	1	6	6
6	(United Kingdom) A Mortimer	6	4	3

==== Section 8 ====
First round

Second round
(West Germany) Helga Schultze	2	6	6
(United Kingdom) Vivienne Cox	6	4	1
(France) Rosie Darmon	3	1
(South Africa) Heather Segal	6	6
(Netherlands) Eva de Jong	6	6
(Italy) Lea Pericoli	3	4
(United Kingdom) Ruth Illingworth	0	2
2	(United States) Darlene Hard	6	6

Third round
(West Germany) H Schultze	6	1	6
(South Africa) H Segal	4	6	3
(Netherlands) E de Jong	0	0
2	(United States) D Hard	6	6

Fourth round
(West Germany) H Schultze	1	0
2	(United States) D Hard	6	6

Preceded by 1962 French Championships – Women's singles	Grand Slam women's singles	Succeeded by 1962 U.S. National Championships – Women's singles
