= 1965 Wimbledon Championships – Women's doubles =

Women's doubles
- 1965 Wimbledon Championships

Final
- Champions: (Brazil) Maria Bueno (United States) Billie Jean Moffitt
- Runners-up: (France) Françoise Dürr (France) Janine Lieffrig
- Score: 6–2, 7–5

Details
- Draw: 48 (5 Q )
- Seeds: 4

Events
Singles	men	women		boys	girls
Doubles	men	women	mixed	boys	girls
← 1964 ·	Wimbledon Championships	· 1966 →

Margaret Smith and Lesley Turner were the defending champions, but lost in the third round to Françoise Dürr and Janine Lieffrig.

Maria Bueno and Billie Jean Moffitt defeated Dürr and Lieffrig in the final, 6–2, 7–5 to win the ladies' doubles tennis title at the 1965 Wimbledon Championships.

== Seeds ==
1. (Australia) Margaret Smith / (Australia) Lesley Turner (third round)
2. (Brazil) Maria Bueno / (United States) Billie Jean Moffitt (champions)
3. (United States) Carole Graebner / (United States) Nancy Richey (semifinals)
4. n/a

Click on the seed number of a player to go to their draw section.

== Draw ==
=== Key ===
- Q = Qualifier
- WC = Wild card
- LL = Lucky loser
- Alt = Alternate
- ITF = ITF entry
- PR = Protected ranking
- SR = Special ranking
- SE = Special exempt
- JE = Junior exempt
- JR = Junior Accelerator Programme entrant
- CO = College Accelerator Programme entrant
- NG = Next Gen Accelerator Program entrant
- w/o = Walkover
- r = Retired
- d = Defaulted

=== Finals ===
Quarterfinals
(France) Françoise Dürr (France) Janine Lieffrig	6	6
(Australia) Jill Blackman (Australia) Robin Lesh	4	1
(South Africa) Glenda Swan (Rhodesia) Pat Walkden	6	2	0
(West Germany) Edda Buding (West Germany) Helga Schultze	4	6	6
(United Kingdom) Christine Truman (United Kingdom) Nell Truman	6	3	3
3	(United States) Carole Graebner (United States) Nancy Richey	2	6	6
(Netherlands) Elly Krocké (Netherlands) Betty Stöve	1	3
2	(Brazil) Maria Bueno (United States) Billie Jean Moffitt	6	6

Semifinals
(France) Françoise Dürr (France) Janine Lieffrig	6	7
(West Germany) Edda Buding (West Germany) Helga Schultze	4	5
3	(United States) Carole Graebner (United States) Nancy Richey	4	2
2	(Brazil) Maria Bueno (United States) Billie Jean Moffitt	6	6

Final
(France) Françoise Dürr (France) Janine Lieffrig	2	5
2	(Brazil) Maria Bueno (United States) Billie Jean Moffitt	6	7

=== Top half ===
==== Section 1 ====
First round

Second round
1	(Australia) Margaret Smith (Australia) Lesley Turner	6	6
(United States) Jane Albert (United States) Tory Fretz	1	3
(Australia) Trish McClenaughan (Australia) Fay Toyne	1	6	2
(France) Françoise Dürr (France) Janine Lieffrig	6	1	6
Q	(United Kingdom) Mrs DS Craven (United Kingdom) Margaret O'Donnell	4	6	6
(Spain) Pilar Barril (Spain) Marta Pombo Pereda	6	3	3
(Australia) Jill Blackman (Australia) Robin Lesh	7	6
(United States) Kathy Blake (United States) Julie Heldman	5	2

Third round
1	(Australia) M Smith (Australia) L Turner	4	4
(France) F Dürr (France) J Lieffrig	6	6
Q	(United Kingdom) Mrs DS Craven (United Kingdom) Margaret O'Donnell	2	2
(Australia) J Blackman (Australia) R Lesh	6	6

Fourth round
(France) F Dürr (France) J Lieffrig	6	6
(Australia) J Blackman (Australia) R Lesh	4	1

==== Section 2 ====
First round
(Soviet Union) Anna Dmitrieva (Australia) Madonna Schacht	6	6
(South Africa) Esmé Emmanuel (South Africa) Vivienne Wiggill	0	3
(South Africa) Glenda Swan (Rhodesia) Pat Walkden	6	6
Q	(United Kingdom) Ruth Illingworth (United Kingdom) Jane Rushton	3	4
(Sweden) Katarina Bartholdson (Sweden) Christina Sandberg	3	4
(Canada) Vicki Berner (United States) Mary Habicht	6	6
(Australia) Pamela Brand (Australia) Dorothy Whitely	4	6	6
(Republic of Ireland) Geraldine Houlihan (Republic of Ireland) Eleanor O'Neill	6	4	2
(West Germany) Edda Buding (West Germany) Helga Schultze	6	6
(United Kingdom) Margaret Lee (United Kingdom) Ann Owen	4	0
(United Kingdom) Winnie Shaw (United Kingdom) Joyce Williams	7	6	6
(United Kingdom) Angela Mortimer (United Kingdom) Pauline Roberts	9	2	2
(Netherlands) Trudy Groenman (Netherlands) Elsie Spruyt	6	6
Q	(United Kingdom) Vivienne Dennis (Australia) Margaret Harris	2	3
(Italy) Roberta Beltrame (Italy) Francesca Gordigiani	4	11	1
(Italy) Silvana Lazzarino (Italy) Lea Pericoli	6	9	6

Second round
(Soviet Union) A Dmitrieva (Australia) M Schacht	6	2	3
(South Africa) G Swan (Rhodesia) P Walkden	1	6	6
(Canada) V Berner (United States) M Habicht	4	6	6
(Australia) P Brand (Australia) D Whitely	6	2	3
(West Germany) E Buding (West Germany) H Schultze	4	6	6
(United Kingdom) W Shaw (United Kingdom) J Williams	6	3	3
(Netherlands) G Groenman (Netherlands) E Spruyt	8	3	8
(Italy) S Lazzarino (Italy) L Pericoli	6	6	6

Third round
(South Africa) G Swan (Rhodesia) P Walkden	7	3	6
(Canada) V Berner (United States) M Habicht	5	6	3
(West Germany) E Buding (West Germany) H Schultze	6	8
(Netherlands) G Groenman (Netherlands) E Spruyt	2	6

Fourth round
(South Africa) G Swan (Rhodesia) P Walkden	6	2	0
(West Germany) E Buding (West Germany) H Schultze	4	6	6

=== Bottom half ===
==== Section 3 ====
First round
(Spain) Carmen Coronado (Spain) Ana María Estalella	6	6
(Austria) Monika Hassmann (Austria) Sonja Pachta	1	2
(United Kingdom) Valerie Clark (United Kingdom) Joyce Fulton	6	6
(United Kingdom) Heather Allen (United Kingdom) Mary McAnally	4	2
(United Kingdom) Christine Truman (United Kingdom) Nell Truman	6	6
(United Kingdom) Jill Mills (United Kingdom) Janet Ward	2	4
(United Kingdom) Rita Bentley (United Kingdom) Liz Starkie	4	0
(United Kingdom) Ann Jones (Australia) Judy Tegart	6	6
Q	(South Africa) ME Roche (United Kingdom) Alison Stroud	7	2	8
(United Kingdom) Carole Rosser (United Kingdom) Virginia Wade	5	6	10
(France) Rosie Darmon (West Germany) Heide Schildknecht	6	3	6
(Argentina) Norma Baylon (Belgium) Christiane Mercelis	3	6	2
(France) Monique Salfati (France) Christiane Spinoza	3	8	4
(France) Jacqueline Rees-Lewis (South Africa) Heather Segal	6	6	6
Q	(Mexico) Patricia Reyes (Mexico) Elena Subirats	1	8
3	(United States) Carole Graebner (United States) Nancy Richey	6	10

Second round
(Spain) C Coronado (Spain) AM Estalella	3	6	6
(United Kingdom) V Clark (United Kingdom) J Fulton	6	3	4
(United Kingdom) C Truman (United Kingdom) E Truman	6	6
(United Kingdom) A Jones (Australia) J Tegart	4	2
(United Kingdom) C Rosser (United Kingdom) V Wade	6	6
(France) R Darmon (West Germany) H Schildknecht	2	2
(France) J Rees-Lewis (South Africa) H Segal	3	1
3	(United States) C Graebner (United States) N Richey	6	6

Third round
(Spain) C Coronado (Spain) AM Estalella	0	2
(United Kingdom) C Truman (United Kingdom) E Truman	6	6
(United Kingdom) C Rosser (United Kingdom) V Wade	5	2
3	(United States) C Graebner (United States) N Richey	7	6

Fourth round
(United Kingdom) C Truman (United Kingdom) E Truman	6	3	3
3	(United States) C Graebner (United States) N Richey	2	6	6

==== Section 4 ====
First round

Second round
(Norway) Liv Paldan (Sweden) Ulla Sandulf	1	2
(Netherlands) Elly Krocké (Netherlands) Betty Stöve	6	6
(Australia) Carol Sherriff (Australia) Gail Sherriff	5	2
(United States) Justina Bricka (United States) Mary-Ann Eisel	7	6
(United Kingdom) Lorna Cawthorn (United Kingdom) Robin Lloyd	4	6	6
(Czechoslovakia) Jitka Volavková (Czechoslovakia) Vlasta Vopičková	6	1	4
(Italy) Lucia Bassi (Italy) Maria Teresa Riedl	2	0
2	(Brazil) Maria Bueno (United States) Billie Jean Moffitt	6	6

Third round
(Netherlands) E Krocké (Netherlands) B Stöve	4	6	11
(United States) J Bricka (United States) M-A Eisel	6	3	9
(United Kingdom) L Cawthorn (United Kingdom) R Lloyd	3	1
(Brazil) M Bueno (United States) BJ Moffitt	6	6

Fourth round
(Netherlands) E Krocké (Netherlands) B Stöve	1	3
2	(Brazil) M Bueno (United States) BJ Moffitt	6	6
