= Jean Drysdale =

South African tennis player

- Country (sports): South Africa
- Born: 23 September 1939
- Died: 31 March 1984 (aged 44) Austin, Texas

Grand Slam singles results
- French Open: 3R (1962)
- Wimbledon: 4R (1962)

Grand Slam doubles results
- French Open: 2R (1956, 1962)
- Wimbledon: 3R (1962)
- US Open: 2R (1967)

Grand Slam mixed doubles results
- French Open: QF (1956)
- Wimbledon: QF (1962)
- US Open: 1R (1967)

Jean Drysdale (née Forbes; 23 September 1939 — 31 March 1984) was a South African tennis player.

Drysdale grew up on a sheep farm in Burgersdorp and the family had a tennis court as part of the property, where she practised with elder brothers Gordon and Jack Forbes, both tour players.

As a 15-year old in 1955 she made a surprise run to the singles final of the Queen's Club Championships, a precursor tournament to Wimbledon. She defeated two players who gained high seedings at Wimbledon, Darlene Hard and Dorothy Knode, but was unable to compete at the championships herself due to an age restriction.

Drysdale's best performance at the Wimbledon Championships came in 1962 when she reached the fourth round of the singles and while partnering brother Gordon made the mixed doubles quarter-finals.

In 1967 she married tennis player Cliff Drysdale in London. She had another tennis playing relation at this time in Valerie Koortzen, a Wimbledon quarter-finalist, who was her sister-in-law during her marriage to Gordon Forbes.

Drysdale settled in Texas, working as a teaching pro at Lakeway World of Resorts. Around 1982 she separated from husband Cliff, with whom she had two children. She died at the age of 44 in 1984 of an undisclosed illness.
