= 1961 U.S. National Championships (tennis) =

- Date: September 1–10
- Edition: 81st
- Category: Grand Slam (ITF)
- Surface: Grass / Outdoor
- Location: Forest Hills, Queens; New York City, New York
- Venue: West Side Tennis Club

Champions

Men's singles
- (Australia) Roy Emerson

Women's singles
- (United States) Darlene Hard

Men's doubles
- (United States) Chuck McKinley / (United States) Dennis Ralston

Women's doubles
- (United States) Darlene Hard / (Australia) Lesley Turner

Mixed doubles
- (Australia) Margaret Smith / (Australia) Bob Mark
- U.S. National Championships

The 1961 U.S. National Championships (now known as the US Open) was a tennis tournament that took place on the outdoor grass courts at the West Side Tennis Club, Forest Hills in New York City, New York. The tournament ran from September 1 until September 10, 1961. It was the 81st staging of the U.S. National Championships, and the fourth Grand Slam tennis event of 1961.

== Finals ==
=== Men's singles ===
(Australia) Roy Emerson defeated (Australia) Rod Laver 7–5, 6–3, 6–2

=== Women's singles ===
(United States) Darlene Hard defeated (United Kingdom) Ann Haydon 6–3, 6–4

=== Men's doubles ===
(United States) Chuck McKinley / (United States) Dennis Ralston defeated (Mexico) Rafael Osuna / (Mexico) Antonio Palafox 6–3, 6–4, 2–6, 13–11

=== Women's doubles ===
(United States) Darlene Hard / (Australia) Lesley Turner defeated (West Germany) Edda Buding / (Mexico) Yola Ramírez 6–4, 5–7, 6–0

=== Mixed doubles ===
(Australia) Margaret Smith / (Australia) Bob Mark defeated (United States) Darlene Hard / (United States) Dennis Ralston default (Note: Ralston was suspended by the USLTA for 'bad conduct' during an earlier Davis Cup American Zone final match against Mexico. As a result of the suspension the mixed doubles title was defaulted to Margaret Smith and Bob Mark.)

== Notes ==
Preceded by 1961 Wimbledon Championships	Grand Slams	Succeeded by 1962 Australian Championships
