= Valerie Koortzen =

South African former tennis player

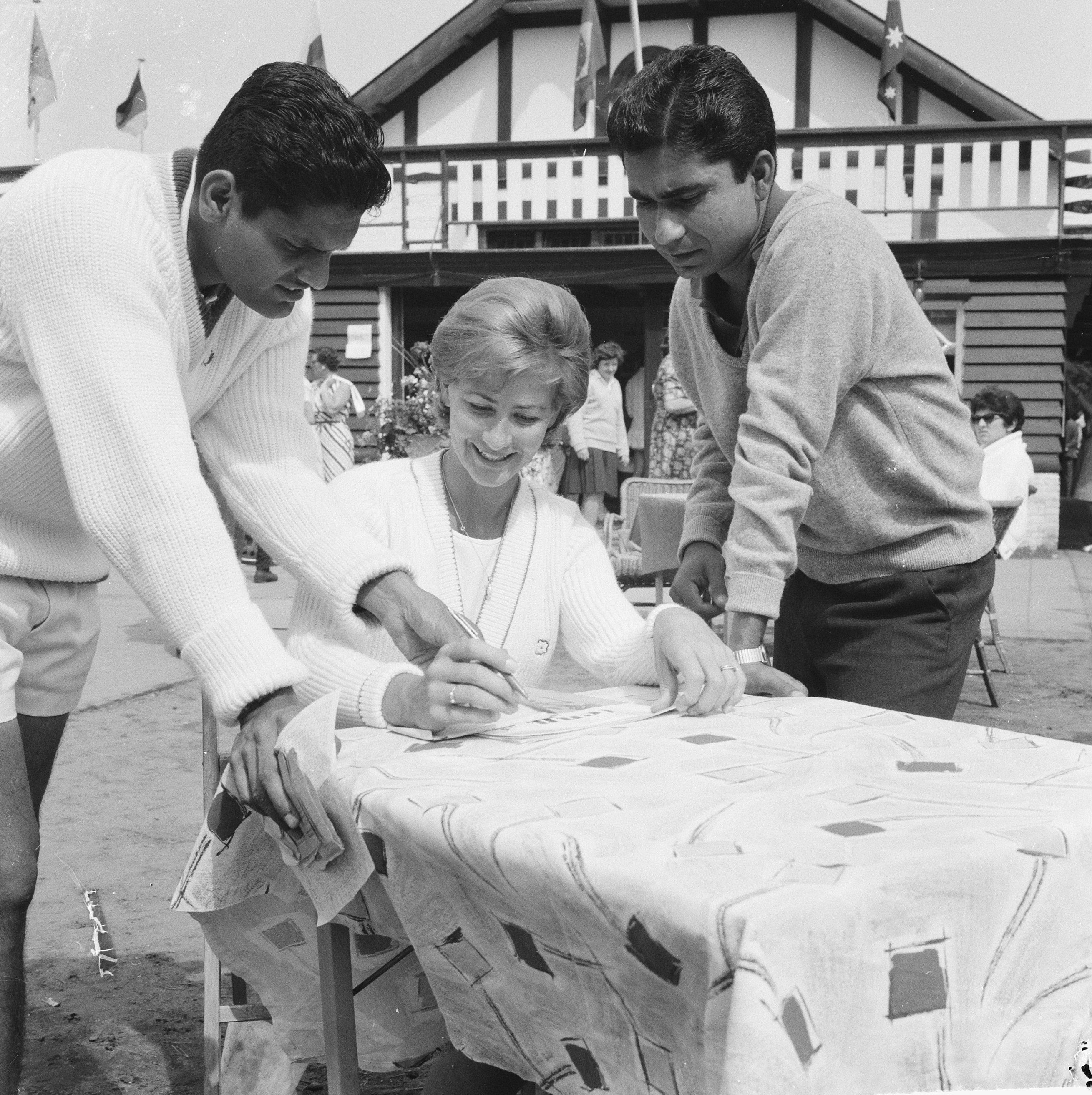
- Country (sports): South Africa
- Born: 15 February 1937 (age 89)

Grand Slam singles results
- French Open: 2R (1957, 1962)
- Wimbledon: 3R (1955, 1962)

Grand Slam doubles results
- French Open: QF (1958)
- Wimbledon: QF (1955, 1962)

Grand Slam mixed doubles results
- French Open: 2R (1958, 1962)
- Wimbledon: 4R (1962)

Valerie Koortzen (born 15 February 1937) is a South African former professional tennis player.

Koortzen, active on tour in the 1950s and 1960s, twice made it to the singles third round of the Wimbledon Championships. She was a women's doubles quarter-finalist at both Wimbledon and the French Championships. Her career singles titles included Düsseldorf in 1957, beating Pat Ward in the final.

From 1956 to 1971 she was married to tennis player Gordon Forbes.
