= Eleanor McFadden =

Irish tennis player

Eleanor O'Neill
- Country (sports): Ireland

Singles

Grand Slam singles results
- French Open: 2R (1962)
- Wimbledon: 1R (1961, 1962)
- US Open: 2R (1962)

Doubles

Grand Slam doubles results
- French Open: 3R (1962)
- Wimbledon: 1R (1959, 1961, 1964, 1965)

Grand Slam mixed doubles results
- French Open: 1R (1962)
- Wimbledon: 2R (1965)
- US Open: QF (1964)

Eleanor McFadden (nee O'Neill) is an Irish former tennis player.

O'Neill grew up in the village of Laytown in County Meath and is a niece of Mayo footballer Paddy Moclair. From 1956 to 1958 she won three successive national under 18 singles championships and became an Irish number one in the 1960s. She took part in Ireland's first ever Federation Cup campaign in 1964, which ended in a loss to the United States in Philadelphia. In 1969 she announced she was quitting amateur tennis to pursue professional coaching. She did however make further Federation Cup appearances for Ireland in 1972 and 1973.
