= Els Veentjer-Spruyt =

Dutch tennis player

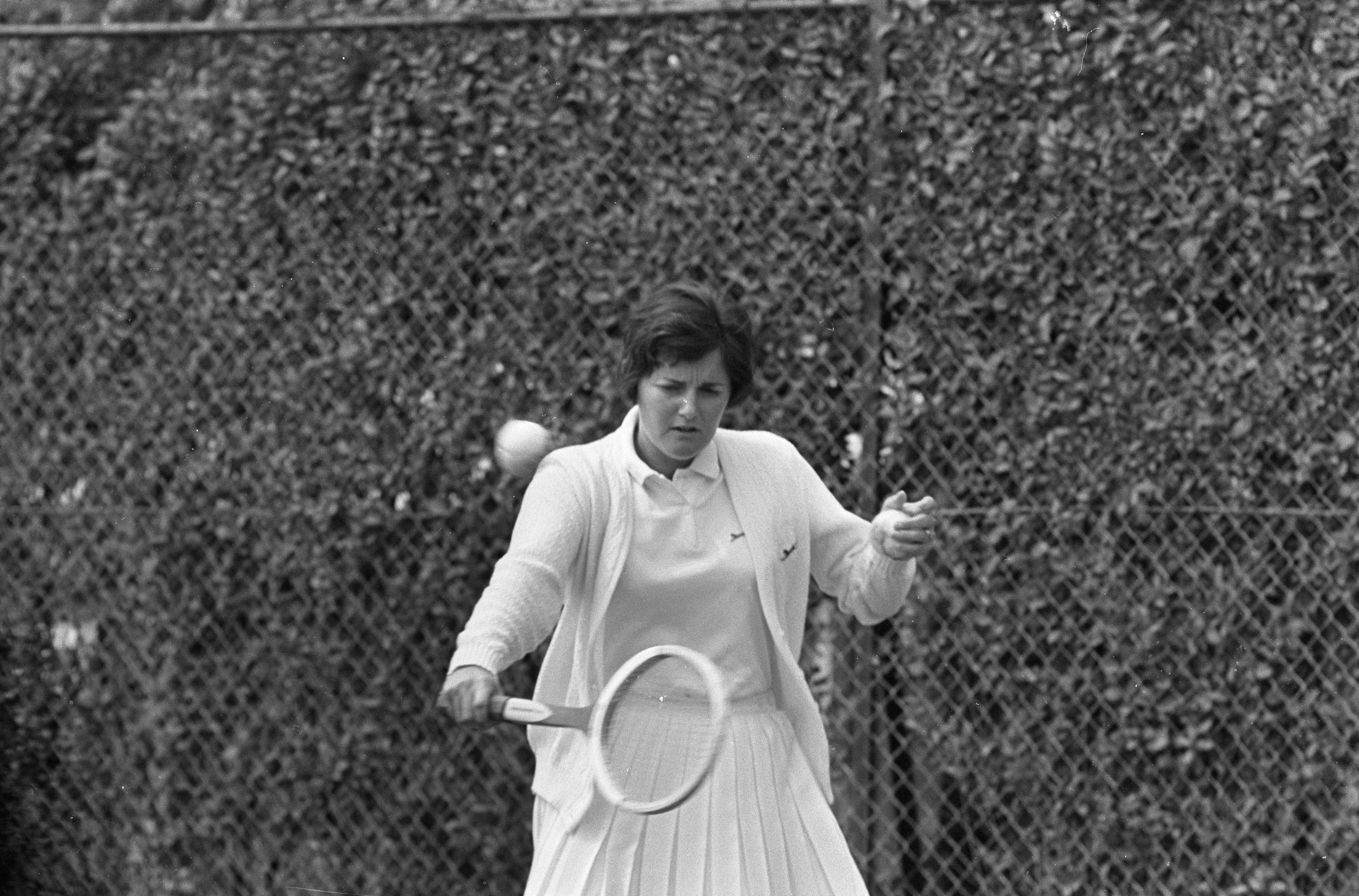
- Full name: Elsie Veentjer-Spruyt
- Country (sports): Netherlands
- Born: 7 December 1943 (age 81)
- Plays: Right-handed

Singles

Grand Slam singles results
- Wimbledon: 1R (1965, 1966)

Doubles

Grand Slam doubles results
- Wimbledon: 3R (1965)

Grand Slam mixed doubles results
- Wimbledon: 2R (1965)

Elsie Veentjer-Spruyt (born Elsie Spruyt; 7 December 1943) is a Dutch former tennis player.

A three-time national doubles champion, Veentjer-Spruyt featured in the main draw of four Wimbledon Championships during the 1960s. Her best result was a third round appearance in women's doubles with Trudy Groenman in 1965. She never won a Wimbledon singles match, although in 1967 she received a bye and then default to be drawn against Billie Jean King in the third round, but was deemed unfit and couldn't take to the court.

Veentjer-Spruyt was a member of the Dutch 1966 Federation Cup team, defeated in the quarter-finals by Australia.

== See also ==
- List of Netherlands Fed Cup team representatives
