= Frances MacLennan =

British tennis player

- Country (sports): United Kingdom
- Born: 20 December 1943 (age 81); Glasgow, Scotland

Singles
- Career record: 98-123 (43.1%)
- Career titles: 10

Grand Slam singles results
- French Open: 3R (1966)
- Wimbledon: 4R (1965)
- US Open: 2R (1968)

Doubles

Grand Slam doubles results
- French Open: 3R (1962, 1966)
- Wimbledon: SF (1968)
- US Open: 1R (1969)

Grand Slam mixed doubles results
- French Open: 1R (1966, 1973)
- Wimbledon: 4R (1968)
- US Open: 2R (1969, 1974)
Medal record
Representing Great Britain
Summer Universiade
Bronze medal – third place	1967 Tokyo	Women's Doubles

Frances MacLennan (born 20 December 1943) is a British former professional tennis player.

== Career ==
MacLennan, born in Glasgow, was one of Great Britain's top players of the late 1950s and the 1960s.

She won her first tournament in 1959 at the West of Scotland Championships

A regular competitor at Wimbledon, she made it through the round of 16 of the singles in 1965, but her best performance at the tournament was a semi-final appearance in doubles with Robin Lloyd in 1968.

She won her last tennis tournament in 1968 at the Mallorca International in Palma against Ana María Estalella.

MacLennan is the former wife of tennis player Roger Taylor, whom she married in 1969. The couple had three children.
