= Kaye Dening =

Australian businesswoman and tennis player (1945–2019)

- Full name: Helen Kaye Ledgerwood
- Country (sports): Australia
- Born: 4 June 1945 Sydney, Australia
- Died: 29 October 2019 (aged 74) Sydney, Australia

Grand Slam singles results
- Australian Open: SF (1963)
- French Open: 2R (1962, 1964)
- Wimbledon: 2R (1962)
- US Open: 3R (1962)

Grand Slam doubles results
- Australian Open: SF (1964)
Medal record
Representing Australia
Summer Universiade
Gold medal – first place	1967 Tokyo	Mixed doubles

Helen Kaye Ledgerwood AM (4 June 1945 – 29 October 2019), born Helen Kaye Dening, was an Australian businesswoman and international tennis player.

Dening was a top junior player, winning girls' singles titles at the 1962 French Championships and 1964 Australian Championships. She also reached the women's singles semi-finals of the 1963 Australian Championships.

Graduating from the University of Sydney in 1967, Dening became a business executive and was honoured in 1995 with a Member of the Order of Australia (AM) "in recognition of service to the building industry".
