= Pia Balling =

Danish tennis player

- Full name: Kirsten Pia Balling
- Country (sports): Denmark
- Born: 20 June 1940 (age 85)
- Height: 5 ft 5 in (165 cm)

Singles

Grand Slam singles results
- US Open: 3R (1962)

Doubles

Grand Slam doubles results
- Wimbledon: 1R (1962, 1963)

Grand Slam mixed doubles results
- Wimbledon: 3R (1963)

Kirsten Pia Balling (born 20 June 1940) is a Danish former professional tennis player.

A native of Vedbæk, Balling started playing tennis at the age of 14 and received tutoring from Kurt Nielsen.

Balling was an 11-time Danish national singles champion in the 1960s, winning five indoor and six outdoor titles. She featured in doubles main draws at Wimbledon during her career and in 1962 reached the singles third round of the U.S. National Championships. Between 1963 and 1967 she represented Denmark in the Federation Cup.

== Personal life ==
Balling studied at Russell Sage College in New York. As of 2003 she was running a cafe in Carefree, Arizona. She is the mother of professional tennis player Merete Balling-Stockmann.
