= Albury Technical College =

Australian college

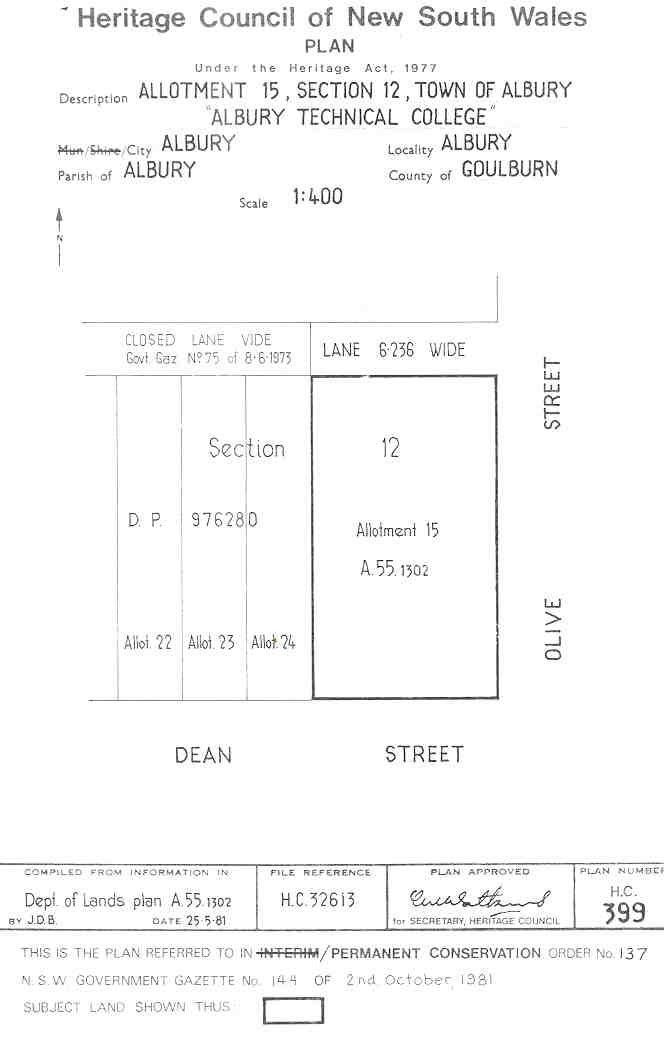
- Heritage boundaries

- Location within New South Wales Location within Australia
- 36.0807°S 146.9180°E
- Location: 502 Dean Street, Albury, City of Albury, New South Wales, Australia

Site notes
- Owner: Charles Sturt University

New South Wales Heritage Register
- Official name: Albury Technical College; Albury TAFE Annex
- Type: state heritage (complex / group)
- Designated: 2 April 1999
- Reference no.: 137
- Type: Tertiary College
- Category: Education

Albury Technical College is a heritage-listed tertiary college at 502 Dean Street, Albury, in the Riverina region of New South Wales, Australia. It is also known as Albury TAFE Annex. The property is owned by Charles Sturt University. It was added to the New South Wales State Heritage Register on 2 April 1999.

== Heritage listing ==
Albury Technical College was listed on the New South Wales State Heritage Register on 2 April 1999.
