= Victoria Palmer =

American tennis player (born 1945)

- Country (sports): United States
- Born: 1945 (age 79–80)
- Plays: Right-handed

Singles

Grand Slam singles results
- Wimbledon: 4R (1962)
- US Open: SF (1962)

Victoria Heinicke (born 1945) is an American former tennis player. She competed under her maiden name Palmer.

Raised in Phoenix, Arizona, Palmer is the middle child of five tennis playing siblings. Her elder brother Paul and younger brother Butch both competed on tour. Sisters Patsy and Abigail were top junior players.

Palmer won the U.S girls' grass court championships back to back in 1961 and 1962.

A baseline player, Palmer made the singles fourth round of the 1962 Wimbledon Championships, beating Robyn Ebbern along the way. She was a semi-finalist at the 1962 U.S. National Championships, with her performance including a win over the second seed Karen Susman. After beating Gwyneth Thomas in the quarter-finals, she was beaten by fifth seed Darlene Hard. She ended the year as the seventh-ranked player in the U.S.

Palmer was runner-up to Nancy Richey at the U.S. Women's Clay Court Championships in 1963.

In 1964 she was married to University of Arizona student Nye Heinicke.

Palmer is considered by many, including journalist Bud Collins, as the first player on tour who would regularly grunt on shots.
