= 1961 U.S. National Championships – Women's singles =

Women's singles
- 1961 U.S. National Championships

Final
- Champion: (United States) Darlene Hard
- Runner-up: (United Kingdom) Ann Haydon-Jones
- Score: 6–3, 6–4

Details
- Seeds: 8

Events
Singles	men	women
Doubles	men	women
- U.S. National Championships

First-seeded and defending champion Darlene Hard defeated sixth-seeded Ann Haydon 6–3, 6–4 in the final to win the women's singles tennis title at the 1961 U.S. National Championships.

== Seeds ==
The seeded players are listed below. Darlene Hard is the champion; others show in brackets the round in which they were eliminated.

1. (United States) Darlene Hard (champion)
2. (United Kingdom) Angela Mortimer (semifinals)
3. (United States) Karen Hantze (third round)
4. (United Kingdom) Christine Truman (quarterfinals)
5. (Australia) Margaret Smith (semifinals)
6. (United Kingdom) Ann Haydon (finalist)
7. (Australia) Lesley Turner (quarterfinals)
8. (Mexico) Yola Ramírez (quarterfinals)

== Draw ==
=== Key ===
- Q = Qualifier
- WC = Wild card
- LL = Lucky loser
- r = Retired

=== Final eight ===
Quarterfinals
1	(United States) Darlene Hard	6	6
7	(Mexico) Yola Ramírez	3	1
5	(Australia) Margaret Smith	8	6	6
4	(United Kingdom) Christine Truman	10	4	3
(Australia) Jan Lehane	4	7	2
6	(United Kingdom) Ann Haydon	6	5	6
7	(Australia) Lesley Turner	3	4
2	(United Kingdom) Angela Mortimer	6	6

Semifinals
1	(United States) Darlene Hard	6	4	6
5	(Australia) Margaret Smith	4	6	3
6	(United Kingdom) Ann Haydon	6	6
2	(United Kingdom) Angela Mortimer	4	2

Finals
1	(United States) Darlene Hard	6	6
6	(United Kingdom) Ann Haydon	3	4

Preceded by 1961 Wimbledon Championships – Women's singles	Grand Slam women's singles	Succeeded by 1962 Australian Championships – Women's singles
