= Carole Graebner =

American tennis player (1943–2008)

Carole Caldwell Graebner
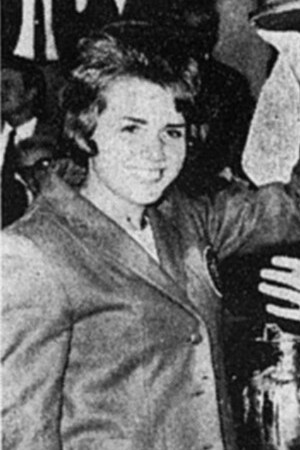
- Carole Caldwell Graebner in 1966
- ITF name: Carole Graebner
- Country (sports): United States
- Born: June 24, 1943 Pittsburgh, Pennsylvania
- Died: November 19, 2008 (aged 65) New York, United States

Singles
- Highest ranking: No.4 (1964)

Grand Slam singles results
- Australian Open: SF (1966)
- French Open: 1R (1966)
- Wimbledon: 4R (1964)
- US Open: F (1964)

Doubles

Grand Slam doubles results
- Australian Open: W (1966)
- Wimbledon: SF (1965)
- US Open: W (1965)

Grand Slam mixed doubles results
- Australian Open: 2R (1965, 1966)
- Wimbledon: QF (1965)
- US Open: QF (1967)

Carole Graebner (née Caldwell; June 24, 1943 – November 19, 2008) was an American tennis player. According to Lance Tingay of The Daily Telegraph and the Daily Mail, Graebner was ranked in the world top 10 in 1964 and 1965, reaching a career high of World No. 4 in these rankings in 1964. Graebner was included in the year-end top 10 rankings issued by the United States Lawn Tennis Association from 1961 through 1965 and in 1967. She was the third-ranked U.S. player in 1964 and 1965. She was ranked U.S. No. 1 in doubles in 1963.

== Career summary ==
Graebner paired with Nancy Richey to win doubles titles at the U.S. National Championships in 1965 (defeating Billie Jean King and Karen Hantze Susman in the final) and the Australian Championships in 1966 (defeating Margaret Court and Lesley Turner Bowrey in the final). Graebner lost to Maria Bueno in the singles final of the 1964 U.S. Championships.

Graebner won the doubles title at the U.S. Women's Clay Court Championships in 1964 and 1965. In the singles event, she was a runner-up in 1962 and 1964 to Donna Floyd and Nancy Richey respectively.

In 1961, at the tournament in Cincinnati, Caldwell won the doubles title with Cathie Gagel and lost the singles final to Peachy Kellmeyer. Caldwell won the Pacific Southwest singles title in 1962 and 1965 and won a gold medal in doubles at the 1963 Pan American Games.

Graebner was on the first U.S. Federation Cup team and attended California State University, Los Angeles. After her playing career ended, Graebner was a radio and television commentator and a vice president with Tennis Week magazine. She also served in sales and administration with Sports Investors, Inc. Graebner was the chair of the Fed Cup Committee and vice chair of the Wightman Cup Committee.

=== Awards and honors ===
She was the recipient of the USTA Service Bowl Award in 1989 and the Sarah Palfrey Danzig Award in 1991. She was named Eastern Tennis Association Woman of the Year in 1989. In 1997, she was inducted into the ITA Women's Collegiate Tennis Hall of Fame.

== Personal ==
Caldwell was born in Pittsburgh, Pennsylvania and grew up in Santa Monica, California. On July 11, 1964, she married American tennis star Clark Graebner. They had two children, a daughter Cameron and a son Clark. The couple later divorced.

Graebner died of cancer in New York City on November 19, 2008, aged 65.

== Grand Slam finals ==
=== Singles: 1 (1 runner-up) ===
Result	Year	Championship	Surface	Opponent	Score
Loss	1964	US Championships	Grass	(Brazil) Maria Bueno	1–6, 0–6

=== Doubles: 2 (2 titles) ===
Result	Year	Championship	Surface	Partner	Opponents	Score
Win	1965	US Championships	Grass	(United States) Nancy Richey	(United States) Billie Jean King (United States) Karen Susman	6–4, 6–4
Win	1966	Australian Championships	Grass	(United States) Nancy Richey	(Australia) Margaret Smith (Australia) Lesley Turner	6–4, 7–5

== Grand Slam singles tournament timeline ==
Key
W	F	SF	QF	#R	RR	Q#	DNQ	A	NH

(W) winner; (F) finalist; (SF) semifinalist; (QF) quarterfinalist; (#R) rounds 4, 3, 2, 1; (RR) round-robin stage; (Q#) qualification round; (DNQ) did not qualify; (A) absent; (NH) not held; (SR) strike rate (events won / competed); (W–L) win–loss record.

Tournament	1959	1960	1961	1962	1963	1964	1965	1966	1967	1968	1969	1970	1971	1972	Career SR
Australian Championships	A	A	A	A	A	A	QF	SF	A	A	A	A	A	A	0 / 2
French Championships	A	A	A	A	A	A	A	1R	A	A	A	A	A	A	0 / 1
Wimbledon	A	A	A	3R	3R	4R	2R	A	2R	A	2R	2R	A	1R	0 / 8
United States	1R	2R	1R	4R	4R	F	QF	A	4R	1R	2R	2R	1R	A	0 / 12
SR	0 / 1	0 / 1	0 / 1	0 / 2	0 / 2	0 / 2	0 / 3	0 / 2	0 / 2	0 / 1	0 / 2	0 / 2	0 / 1	0 / 1	0 / 23

== See also ==
- Performance timelines for all female tennis players since 1978 who reached at least one Grand Slam final
