= Ana María Estalella =

Spanish tennis player (1933–2015)

- Full name: Ana María Estalella-Manso
- Country (sports): Spain
- Born: 5 May 1933; Madrid, Spain
- Died: 21 November 2015 (aged 82)
- Plays: Right-handed

Singles

Grand Slam singles results
- French Open: 2R (1966)
- Wimbledon: 3R (1961)

Doubles

Grand Slam doubles results
- French Open: 3R (1965)
- Wimbledon: 3R (1962, 1965)

Grand Slam mixed doubles results
- French Open: 2R (1966)
- Wimbledon: 3R (1962)

Ana María Estalella-Manso (5 May 1933 — 21 November 2015) was a Spanish tennis player.

Estalella, born in Madrid, was the daughter of Ana Manso de Zúñiga and Ramon Estalella Pujola. Her father, a diplomat and painter, was of Spanish descent but became a Cuban subject. He served as Head of Mission for the Cuban Embassy in Madrid during the Spanish Civil War.

Due to her father's adopted nationality, Estalella was also considered to be foreign and was excluded from Spain's national championships until 1959. She won four national singles titles in the 1960s. Her career continued into the 1970s and she was a member of Spain's first Federation Cup team in 1972.

== See also ==
- List of Spain Fed Cup team representatives
