= Margaret Court =

Australian former tennis player (born 1942)

The Reverend Margaret Court AC MBE
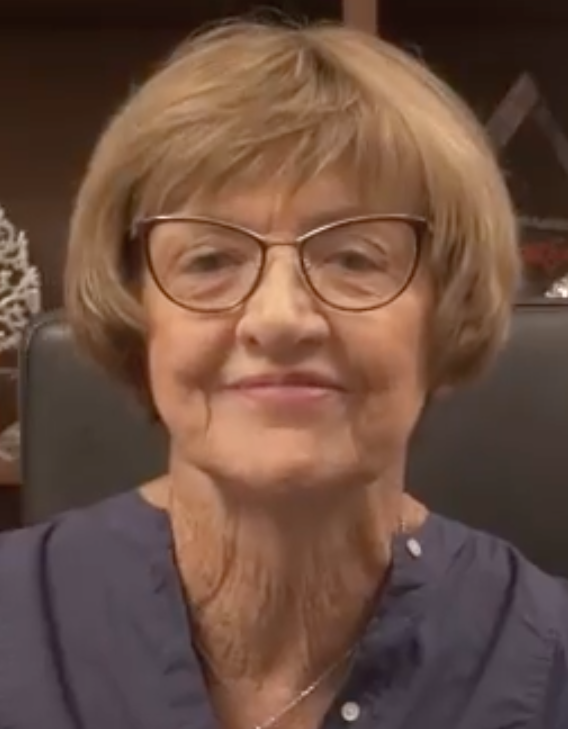
- Court in 2018
- Country (sports): Australia
- Residence: Perth, Western Australia, Australia
- Born: 16 July 1942 (age 84) Albury, New South Wales, Australia
- Height: 5 ft 9 in (175 cm)
- Turned pro: 1968
- Retired: 1977
- Plays: Right-handed (one-handed backhand)
- Int. Tennis HoF: 1979 (member page)

Singles
- Career record: 1,177–106 (91.74%)
- Career titles: 192 (92 during the Open Era)
- Highest ranking: No. 1 (1962)

Grand Slam singles results
- Australian Open: W (1960, 1961, 1962, 1963, 1964, 1965, 1966, 1969, 1970, 1971, 1973)
- French Open: W (1962, 1964, 1969, 1970, 1973)
- Wimbledon: W (1963, 1965, 1970)
- US Open: W (1962, 1965, 1969, 1970, 1973)

Doubles
- Highest ranking: No. 1 (1963)

Grand Slam doubles results
- Australian Open: W (1961, 1962, 1963, 1965, 1969, 1970, 1971, 1973)
- French Open: W (1964, 1965, 1966, 1973)
- Wimbledon: W (1964, 1969)
- US Open: W (1963, 1968, 1970, 1973, 1975)

Other doubles tournaments
- Tour Finals: W (1973, 1975)

Mixed doubles
- Career titles: 21 (7 during the open era)

Grand Slam mixed doubles results
- Australian Open: W (1963, 1964, 1965, 1969)
- French Open: W (1963, 1964, 1965, 1969)
- Wimbledon: W (1963, 1965, 1966, 1968, 1975)
- US Open: W (1961, 1962, 1963, 1964, 1965, 1969, 1970, 1972)

Team competitions
- Fed Cup: W (1964, 1965, 1968, 1971)

Margaret Court AC MBE (née Smith; born 16 July 1942), also known as Margaret Smith Court, is an Australian former world number 1 tennis player. Her 24 women's singles major titles and total of 64 major titles (including 19 major women's doubles and 21 major mixed doubles titles) are the most in women's tennis history.

Court was born in Albury, New South Wales. In 1960, aged 17, she won the first of seven consecutive Australian Open singles titles. She completed the career Grand Slam in singles aged 21 with her victory at Wimbledon in 1963. Taking a brief hiatus in 1966 and 1967, Court played as an amateur until the advent of the Open Era in 1968. She completed the Grand Slam by winning all four major singles titles in 1970, part of a record six consecutive major singles victories. Court gave birth to her first child in 1972, but returned to tennis later in the year and won three major singles titles in 1973. She took similar breaks after her second and third children were born, retiring from the game in 1977.

Court is one of only three players in history (all women) to have won the "Boxed Set", consisting of every major title (the singles, doubles and mixed doubles). She is the only player in tennis history to complete a double Boxed Set. Court is also one of only six tennis players to win a double career Grand Slam in two disciplines, matching Roy Emerson, Martina Navratilova, Frank Sedgman, Doris Hart, and Serena Williams. She also won the Fed Cup with Australia on four occasions. The International Tennis Hall of Fame states "For sheer strength of performance and accomplishment there has never been a tennis player to match (her)." Evonne Goolagong called her the greatest female tennis player of all time.

Having grown up Catholic, Court became associated with Pentecostalism in the 1970s and became a Christian minister in that tradition in 1991. She later founded Margaret Court Ministries.

== Early life ==
Court was born on 16 July 1942 in Albury, New South Wales. She was the fourth and youngest child born to Maude (née Beaufort) and Lawrence Smith. Her mother experienced a difficult delivery and came close to dying in childbirth.

Court was raised in Albury where her father worked as a foreman at a cheese and butter factory. The family lived in a "very modest, two bedroom, thin-walled, asbestos dwelling with a tin roof" and did not own a car during her early childhood. She played a variety of sports as a child, including basketball, cricket, softball and soccer, and had a reputation as a tomboy, joining "a group of neighbourhood boys who took pleasure in climbing trees, swinging on ropes over the river, and hitching free rides on trucks as they slowed". Court received her early education at St Bridget's, the local Catholic parochial school. She later attended St Augustine's, a convent school across the river from Albury in Wodonga, Victoria, as well as Albury Technical College.

Court discovered tennis at the age of eight, playing on her own by hitting a tennis ball against a wall with an old fence paling. She was later given an old racquet by her mother's friend and began sneaking in to the nearby Albury and Border Tennis Club with her friends to play on the grass courts. The club's curator and professional coach Wally Rutter soon noticed her talent and invited her to his weekly coaching clinics. She later credited Rutter with encouraging her to pursue tennis professionally and developing her "killer instinct" and sense of sportsmanship.

Court moved to Melbourne at the age of 16 in order to be coached full-time by Frank Sedgman, a former world No. 1. She moved in with her older sister and worked part-time as a receptionist at Sedgman's athletic centre. Sedgman emphasised physical fitness, developing a training regimen that included circuit running, weight-lifting and running on sandhills. He also got her to play on clay courts for the first time, with the intent that she would one day play the French Open.

== Tennis career ==
As a teenager, Court won various state titles on the Australian junior circuit before winning the 1960 Australian Championships on her first attempt at the age of 17, her first major title. This would prove to be the first of seven consecutive national titles. She became the first Australian woman to win a Grand Slam tournament abroad when she won the French and US Championships in 1962. The next year, she became the first Australian woman to win Wimbledon. Across singles, doubles and mixed doubles, she has won a remarkable 64 major titles.

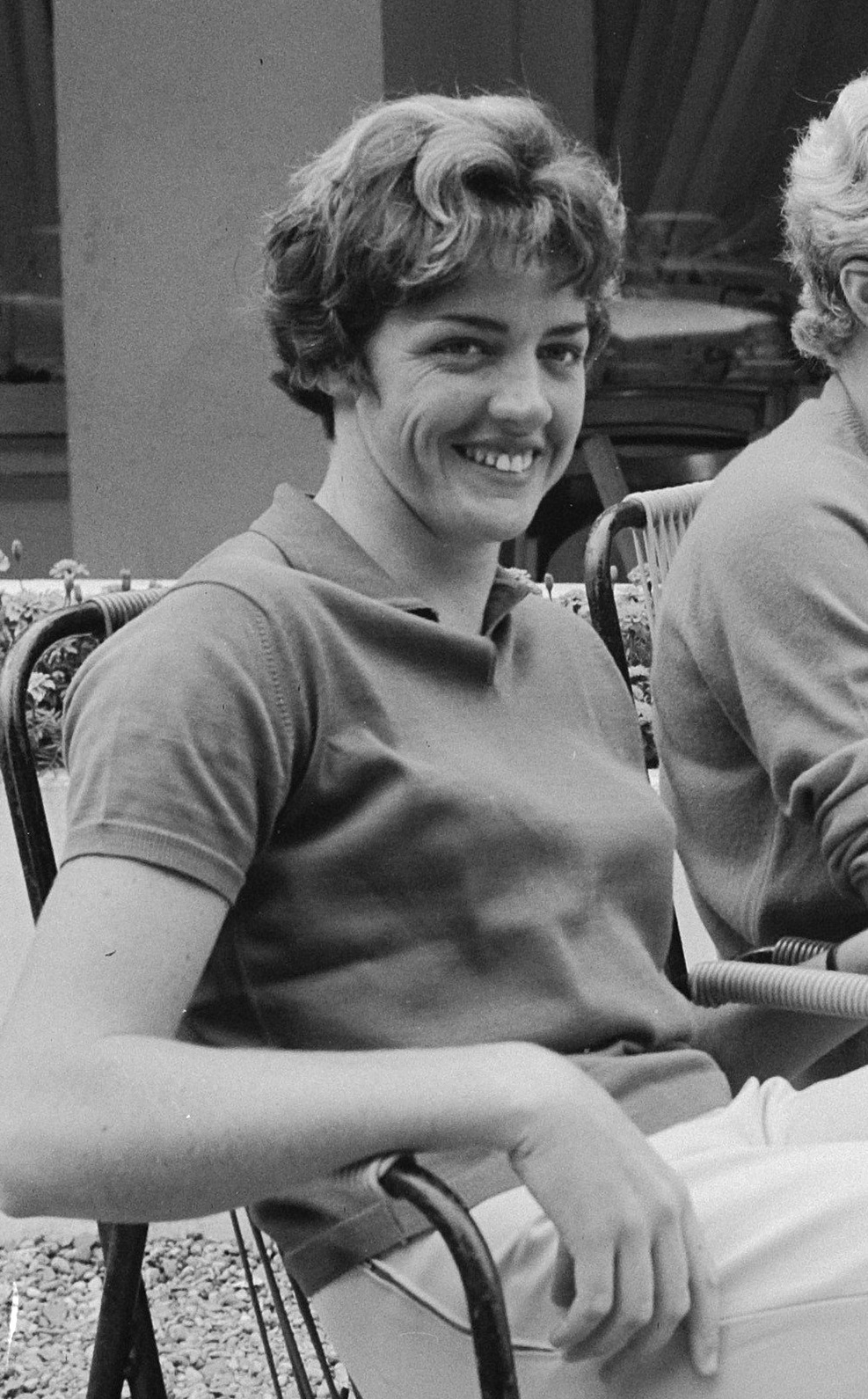
Court in 1964

After the tournament in Munich, Germany in August 1966, Court temporarily retired from tennis. In 1967, she married Barry Court, whose father, Charles Court, and brother, Richard Court, were premiers of Western Australia. She returned to tennis in November 1967, and in 1970 won all four Grand Slam singles titles. The next year, she lost the Wimbledon singles final to Evonne Goolagong while pregnant with her first child, Daniel, who was born in March 1972. She made a comeback that year, playing in the US Open and throughout 1973. Her second child, Marika, was born in 1974. She started playing again in November of that year. After missing most of 1976 after having her third child, she returned to the tour in early 1977 but retired permanently that year when she learned she was expecting her fourth child. Her last Grand Slam tournament singles appearance was in the 1975 US Open. Her last Grand Slam tournament appearance overall was in the 1976 Australian Open in women's doubles.

Court is one of only three players to achieve a career "boxed set" of Grand Slam tournament titles, winning every possible major title—singles, women's doubles and mixed doubles—at all four Grand Slam events. The others are Doris Hart and Martina Navratilova. However, Court is the only person to win all 12 Grand Slam events at least twice. She also is unique in having completed "boxed sets" both before the Open Era and after it began.

Court lost a heavily publicised and U.S.–televised challenge match to a former world No. 1 male tennis player, the 55-year-old Bobby Riggs, on 13 May 1973, in Ramona, California. Court was the top-ranked women's player at the time, and the New York Times claimed that she did not take the match seriously because it was a mere exhibition. Using a mixture of lobs and drop shots, Riggs beat her 6–2, 6–1. Four months later, Billie Jean King beat Riggs in the Battle of the Sexes match in the Houston Astrodome.

In January 2003, Show Court One at the sports and entertainment complex Melbourne Park was renamed Margaret Court Arena. Since 2012, the arena has attracted calls for its name to be changed on the basis of Court's statements against gay and lesbian rights.

== Playing style, Grand Slam records, and rankings ==
During the 1960s, Court was considered to have a very long reach which added a new dimension to women's volleying. With a height and reach advantage and being extremely strong, she was very formidable at the net and had an effective overhead shot. She was considered unusually mobile for her size and played an all attack, serve and volley style which, when added to her big serve, dominated conservative defensive players. Part of what helped her win was her commitment to fitness training. Court was dubbed "The Aussie Amazon" because she did weights, circuit training and running along sandy hillsides. This training helped keep her relatively injury-free through most of her career.

Court won a record 64 Grand Slam tournament titles, including a record 24 singles titles, 19 women's doubles titles and a record 21 mixed doubles titles. The total includes two shared titles at the Australian Championships/Open in 1965 and 1969. The mixed doubles finals of those years were not played because of bad weather and the titles are shared by both of the finalist pairs.

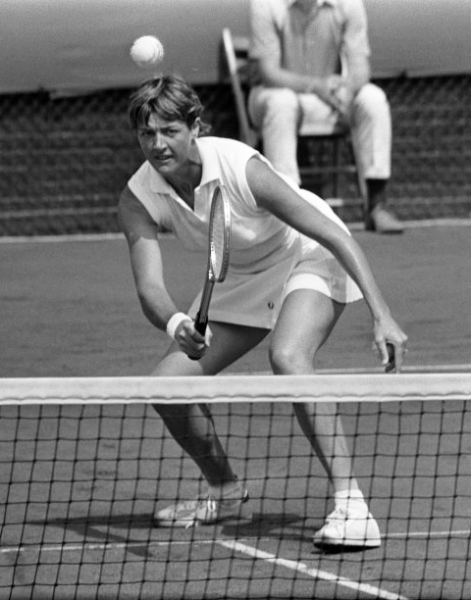
Court at the net in 1970

Court won 62 of the 85 major finals (72.9%) she played, including 24–5 (82.8%) in singles finals, 19–14 (57.6%) in women's doubles finals and 19–4 (82.6%) in mixed doubles finals.

Court reached the final in 29, the semifinals in 36 and the quarterfinals in 43 of the 47 major singles tournaments she played. During her amateur career, from the 1962 Australian Championships to the 1966 Australian Championships, Court won 11 of the 17 major singles tournaments she entered. In a subsequent period of dominance after the start of the Open Era, she won 11 of the 16 major singles tournaments she entered between the 1969 Australian Open and the 1973 US Open. She was 146–2 (98.6%) against unseeded players in major singles tournaments.

Court is the only player to have won the Grand Slam in both singles and mixed doubles. She won the singles Grand Slam in 1970, the mixed doubles Grand Slam in 1963 with fellow Australian Ken Fletcher and the mixed doubles Grand Slam in 1965 with three different partners (Fletcher, John Newcombe and Fred Stolle).

Court won more than half of all the major tournaments held in 1963 (8 of 12), 1964 (7 of 12), 1965 (9 of 12), 1969 (8 of 12), 1970 (7 of 11) and 1973 (6 of 11).

According to the end-of-year rankings compiled by London's Daily Telegraph from 1914 to 1972, Court was ranked world No. 1 six times: 1962, 1963, 1964, 1965, 1969 and 1970. She was also ranked No. 1 for 1973 when the official rankings were produced by the Women's Tennis Association.

== Career timeline ==
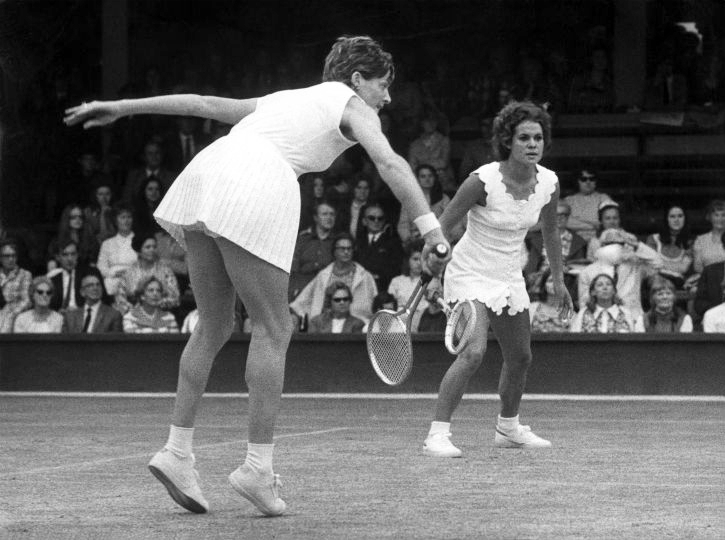
Margaret Court playing doubles at Wimbledon alongside Evonne Goolagong

- 1959 – Competed at the Australian Championships for the first time losing in the second round against eventual tournament winner Mary Reitano.
- 1960 – Won her first singles title at the Australian Championships, but lost the junior girls final there to Lesley Turner.
- 1962 – Won three of the four Grand Slam singles tournaments.
- 1963 – Became the first Australian woman to win a singles title at Wimbledon. She and Ken Fletcher became the only team to win all four Grand Slam mixed-doubles titles during the same calendar year.
- 1964 – Won three of the four Grand Slam mixed doubles tournaments. Her women's doubles title at Wimbledon completed her career "boxed set" of Grand Slam titles.
- 1965 – Won three of the four Grand Slam singles tournaments and all four Grand Slam mixed-doubles titles, with three different partners.
- 1966 – After losing in August to Vlasta Kodesova in the quarterfinals of a tournament in Munich, Germany, Court temporarily retired.
- 1968 - Returned to match play in November 1967 at the New South Wales Championships. She resumed playing a full schedule in 1968, where at the beginning of the season, she lost to Billie Jean King in the finals of the Western Australia Championships and the Australian National Championships.
- 1969 – Won three of the four Grand Slam singles and mixed doubles tournaments.
- 1970 – Won all four Grand Slam singles tournaments, defeating Kerry Melville in the Australian Open final, Helga Masthoff in the French Open final, Billie Jean King in the Wimbledon final, and Rosemary Casals in the US Open final. Maureen Connolly in 1953 and Steffi Graf in 1988 are the only other women who have won all four Grand Slam singles tournaments during the same calendar year.
- 1971 – Won the Australian Championship for the 10th time. After losing in mid-July to Billie Jean King in the semifinals of a tournament in West Kirby, England, Court left the tour to prepare for the March 1972 birth of her first child.
- 1972 – Returned to the tour in late July. Lost to Billie Jean King in the semifinals of the US Open.
- 1973 – Won three of the four Grand Slam singles and women's doubles tournaments. Became the first mother in the Open Era to win the Australian, French, and US Open championships. Lost her match with Bobby Riggs. Her women's doubles title at the French Open completed a "boxed set" of Grand Slam titles won exclusively after the start of the Open Era in 1968.
- 1974 – Absent from the game until November because of the birth of her second child. Won the Western Australian Championships on her playing return and reached the final of the New South Wales Championships the following week.
- 1975 – Played the final Grand Slam singles match of her career, losing to Martina Navratilova in a quarterfinal of the US Open 6–2, 6–4. At her final Australian championships (played in December 1974), she suffered only her second defeat in the singles prior to the final in all her appearances at the event, losing to Navratilova in a quarterfinal. Having won the mixed doubles at her last Wimbledon (partnering Marty Riessen), she partnered with Virginia Wade at the US Open to win her 62nd Grand Slam title and 19th Grand Slam women's doubles title, defeating King and Casals in the final. This was Court's last Grand Slam title. Her last tournament of the year was in late September in Tokyo where she won the title.
- 1976 – Court was absent from the game until late September due to the birth of her third child. Tokyo was her first tournament after returning to the tour, where she lost the final to Betty Stöve. She finished the year by defeating Sue Barker in the singles final in Melbourne, Australia
- 1977 – Played the final singles match of her career, defeating Greer Stevens in the third round of the Virginia Slims Championships of Detroit 5–7, 7–6, 6–3. Court defaulted the quarterfinal to Françoise Dürr upon learning that she was pregnant with her fourth child.

== Honours ==
- On 1 January 1967, she was made Member of the Order of the British Empire (MBE), for her services to sport and international relations.
- In 1963 and 1970, she became winner of the ABC Sportsman of the Year Award.
- In 1970 she also won a Western Australian honour, the Walter Lindrum Award.
- In 1979, Court was inducted into the International Tennis Hall of Fame.
- In 1985, Court was inducted into the Sport Australia Hall of Fame and then elevated to Legend status in 1998.
- In 1993 in Melbourne, she was inducted into the Australian Tennis Hall of Fame.
- In 2000, Court was awarded the Australian Sports Medal for her impressive tennis career.
- In 2001, she was awarded the Centenary Medal for her service to Australian tennis.
- In 2001, she was inducted onto the Victorian Honour Roll of Women.
- In 2003 Court became the recipient of the 2003 Australia Post Australian Legends Award. Australia Post honoured her, together with fellow Australian tennis player Rod Laver by featuring her on postage stamp.
- In 2006, she was awarded the International Tennis Federation's (ITF) accolade, the Philippe Chatrier Award.
- In 2007, she was made an Officer of the Order of Australia (AO), for her services to tennis, as a mentor and to the community.
- In 2021, she was advanced to a Companion of the Order of Australia (AC), for "eminent service to tennis as an internationally acclaimed player and record-holding grand slam champion, and as a mentor of young sportspersons".

== Ministry ==
Court was raised Catholic but became involved with Pentecostalism in the mid-1970s. In 1983, she gained a theological qualification from the Rhema Bible Training Centre, and in 1991 was ordained as an independent Pentecostal minister and so speaks publicly about her faith. She subsequently founded a ministry known as Margaret Court Ministries. In 1995, she founded a Pentecostal church known as the Victory Life Centre in Perth. She still serves as its senior pastor. Her television show, A Life of Victory, airs on Sundays on the Australian Christian Channel and used to show locally in Perth on former community television station West TV. She has generally embraced teachings associated with the Word of Faith movement and teaches her view of biblical doctrine.

In 1997, Court established Victory Life Community Services, later rebranded as Margaret Court Community Outreach (MCCO). In 2014 it was described by The West Australian as "one of WA's biggest stand-alone food charities", supplying around 25 tonnes of food each week.

Since 2010, she has been the president of Victory Life International and she is a long-standing patron of the Australian Family Association and Drug Free Australia.

== Personal views ==
Court has been a consistent critic of same-sex marriage in Australia. In 2012, she opposed proposed same-sex marriage reforms. Court has been criticised for such statements by gay tennis players Billie Jean King, Rennae Stubbs and Martina Navratilova, and in 2012, an LGBT rights protest group called for the renaming of Margaret Court Arena.

Court was criticised in May 2017 after writing a letter to The West Australian decrying Qantas, the largest airline in Australia, for being a corporate supporter of same-sex marriage and saying that she would boycott the airline. The letter, and further follow-up interviews, again led to calls from some Australians and tennis players to rename the Margaret Court Arena. Some politicians, including Prime Minister Malcolm Turnbull, rejected calls for the change of name, saying the name celebrates Margaret Court as a tennis player.

In June 2017, The Guardian's Russell Jackson wrote that Court had always held bigoted views, which he described as "stubbornly immovable", citing her support for apartheid in 1970 ("South Africans have this thing better organised than any other country, particularly America") and her criticisms of Navratilova in 1990 ("a great player but I'd like someone at the top who the younger players can look up to. It's very sad for children to be exposed to homosexuality") as examples. He suggested that this and the similar incident from 2012 are calculated provocations, allowing Court to portray herself as the victim and use the publicity to her advantage, and show that "for better or worse, Court is now the principal architect of her own image".

On 23 January 2019, Anna Wintour, in her keynote address for the Australian Open's Inspirational Series, renewed calls for the arena's renaming. Court responded by saying she was "disappointed" that someone "coming from America" was "unable to tolerate views that were not in line with her own" and "[is] telling us in this nation what to do". Later in the year, Court called on Tennis Australia to honour her and the 50th anniversary of her 1970 Grand Slam in the same way as it honoured Rod Laver earlier in 2019, arguing that the organisation should disregard her views on same-sex marriage, as her tennis achievements are from "a different phase of my life from where I am now and if we are not big enough as a nation and a game to face those challenges there is something wrong." Tennis Australia issued a statement that it "recognises the tennis achievements of Margaret Court, although her views do not align with our values of equality, diversity and inclusion" and said that it is "in the process of working through" how Court's milestone might be included at the 2020 Australian Open. During the tournament, however, high-profile guests Martina Navratilova and John McEnroe paraded a banner calling for the Margaret Court Arena to be renamed in honour of four-time Australian Open champion Evonne Goolagong.

In 2020, her Margaret Court Community Outreach charity was denied a Lotterywest grant for a freezer truck on the basis of her public statements on gay people. She subsequently announced she would lodge a complaint with the Equal Opportunity Commission of Western Australia.

== Portrayal in film ==
Belinda Woolcock portrayed Margaret Court in the 2026 Australian TV drama Goolagong (TV series) .

Jacqueline McKenzie portrayed Court in the 2001 TV movie When Billie Beat Bobby.

Jessica McNamee portrayed Court in the 2017 Hollywood film Battle of the Sexes.

== Grand Slam tournament performance timelines ==
Key
W	F	SF	QF	#R	RR	Q#	DNQ	A	NH

(W) winner; (F) finalist; (SF) semifinalist; (QF) quarterfinalist; (#R) rounds 4, 3, 2, 1; (RR) round-robin stage; (Q#) qualification round; (DNQ) did not qualify; (A) absent; (NH) not held; (SR) strike rate (events won / competed); (W–L) win–loss record.

=== Singles ===
Tournament	1959	1960	1961	1962	1963	1964	1965	1966	1967	1968	1969	1970	1971	1972	1973	1974	1975	SR	W–L
Australian Open	2R	W	W	W	W	W	W	W	A	F	W	W	W	A	W	A	QF	11 / 14	60–3
French Open	A	A	QF	W	QF	W	F	SF	A	A	W	W	3R	A	W	A	A	5 / 10	44–5
Wimbledon	A	A	QF	2R	W	F	W	SF	A	QF	SF	W	F	A	SF	A	SF	3 / 12	51–9
US Open	A	A	SF	W	F	4R	W	A	A	QF	W	W	A	SF	W	A	QF	5 / 11	52–6
Win–loss	1–1	5–0	15–3	16–1	18–2	17–2	22–1	12–2	0–0	11–3	21–1	23–0	11–2	4–1	21–1	0–0	10–3	24 / 47	207–23

=== Doubles ===
Tournament	1959	1960	1961	1962	1963	1964	1965	1966	1967	1968	1969	1970	1971	1972	1973	1974	1975	1976	SR
Australian Open	A	F	W	W	W	F	W	F	A	SF	W	W	W	A	W	A	F	QF	8 / 14
French Open	A	A	3R	F	F	W	W	W	A	A	F	SF	SF	A	W	A	A	A	4 / 10
Wimbledon	A	A	F	SF	F	W	3R	F	A	QF	W	QF	F	A	QF	A	QF	A	2 / 12
US Open	A	A	2R	QF	W	F	A	A	A	W	F	W	A	F	W	A	W	A	5 / 10

=== Mixed doubles ===
Tournament	1959	1960	1961	1962	1963	1964	1965	1966	1967	1968	1969	1970	1971	1972	1973	1974	1975	SR
Australian Open	A	A	A	A	W	W	W	SF	A	F	W	NH	NH	NH	NH	NH	NH	4 / 6
French Open	A	A	SF	A	W	W	W	3R	A	A	W	SF	3R	A	A	A	A	4 / 8
Wimbledon	A	A	SF	A	W	F	W	W	A	W	SF	2R	A	A	F	A	W	5 / 10
US Open	A	A	W	W	W	W	W	A	A	A	W	W	A	W	F	A	SF	8 / 10
SR	0 / 0	0 / 0	1 / 3	1 / 1	4 / 4	3 / 4	4 / 4	1 / 3	0 / 0	1 / 2	3 / 4	1 / 3	0 / 1	1 / 1	0 / 2	0 / 0	1 / 2	21 / 34

Note: The shared mixed doubles titles at the Australian Championships/Open in 1965 and 1969 are not always counted in Court's Grand Slam win total because the finals were never played. The Australian Open does officially count them as joint victories. Otherwise, she would have 21 Grand Slam mixed doubles titles, which is reflected in the above table.

== Grand Slam tournament finals ==
=== Singles: 29 (24 titles, 5 runner-ups) ===
Result	Year	Championship	Surface	Opponent	Score
Win	1960	Australian Championships	Grass	(Australia) Jan Lehane	7–5, 6–2
Win	1961	Australian Championships (2)	Grass	(Australia) Jan Lehane	6–1, 6–4
Win	1962	Australian Championships (3)	Grass	(Australia) Jan Lehane	6–0, 6–2
Win	1962	French Championships	Clay	(Australia) Lesley Turner	6–3, 3–6, 7–5
Win	1962	US Championships	Grass	(United States) Darlene Hard	9–7, 6–4
Win	1963	Australian Championships (4)	Grass	(Australia) Jan Lehane	6–2, 6–2
Win	1963	Wimbledon	Grass	(United States) Billie Jean King	6–3, 6–4
Loss	1963	US Championships	Grass	(Brazil) Maria Bueno	5–7, 4–6
Win	1964	Australian Championships (5)	Grass	(Australia) Lesley Turner	6–3, 6–2
Loss	1964	Wimbledon	Grass	(Brazil) Maria Bueno	4–6, 9–7, 3–6
Win	1964	French Championships (2)	Clay	(Brazil) Maria Bueno	5–7, 6–1, 6–2
Win	1965	Australian Championships (6)	Grass	(Brazil) Maria Bueno	5–7, 6–4, 5–2 ret.
Loss	1965	French Championships	Clay	(Australia) Lesley Turner	3–6, 4–6
Win	1965	Wimbledon (2)	Grass	(Brazil) Maria Bueno	6–4, 7–5
Win	1965	US Championships (2)	Grass	(United States) Billie Jean King	8–6, 7–5
Win	1966	Australian Championships (7)	Grass	(United States) Nancy Richey	walkover
Loss	1968	Australian Championships	Grass	(United States) Billie Jean King	1–6, 2–6
↓ Open Era ↓
Win	1969	Australian Open (8)	Grass	(United States) Billie Jean King	6–4, 6–1
Win	1969	French Open (3)	Clay	(United Kingdom) Ann Haydon-Jones	6–1, 4–6, 6–3
Win	1969	US Open (3)	Grass	(United States) Nancy Richey	6–2, 6–2
Win	1970	Australian Open (9)	Grass	(Australia) Kerry Melville	6–1, 6–3
Win	1970	French Open (4)	Clay	(West Germany) Helga Masthoff	6–2, 6–4
Win	1970	Wimbledon (3)	Grass	(United States) Billie Jean King	14–12, 11–9
Win	1970	US Open (4)	Grass	(United States) Rosemary Casals	6–2, 2–6, 6–1
Win	1971	Australian Open (10)	Grass	(Australia) Evonne Goolagong	2–6, 7–6, 7–5
Loss	1971	Wimbledon	Grass	(Australia) Evonne Goolagong	4–6, 1–6
Win	1973	Australian Open (11)	Grass	(Australia) Evonne Goolagong	6–4, 7–5
Win	1973	French Open (5)	Clay	(United States) Chris Evert	6–7, 7–6, 6–4
Win	1973	US Open (5)	Grass	(Australia) Evonne Goolagong	7–6, 5–7, 6–2

== Records ==
- Records in **bold** indicate peer-less achievements.

=== All-time Grand Slam tournament records ===
- These are women's standing records for all-time period in tennis history.

Accomplishment	Years	Record	Players matched
Grand Slam singles titles won	1960–1973	24	**Stands alone**
Grand Slam overall titles won	1960–1975	64	**Stands alone**
Grand Slam mixed doubles titles won	1960–1975	21	**Stands alone**
Completed the Grand Slam (all 4 in one calendar year) – singles	1970	1	Maureen Connolly, Steffi Graf
Completed the Grand Slam (all 4 in one calendar year) – mixed doubles	1963, 1965	2	**Stands alone**
Australian Grand Slam singles titles won	1960–1973	11	**Stands alone**
Australian Grand Slam overall titles won	1960–1977	21	**Stands alone**
French Grand Slam overall titles won	1962–1973	13	**Stands alone**
Triple Crown (singles, doubles & mixed doubles champion at same GS event)	1963–1970	5	Suzanne Lenglen
Career Boxed Set (minimum of every title in all 3 disciplines at all 4 Majors)	1960–1969	2	**Stands alone**
Most consecutive number of Major titles won	1969–1971	6	Maureen Connolly, Martina Navratilova
Most Major titles won in a single decade	1960's	16	**Stands alone**
1969 Australian Open – 1971 Australian Open	1969–1971	Won 8 out of 9 consecutive	Steffi Graf
Open-era best Grand Slam match win percentage	1968–1975	96–10 (90.6%)	**Stands alone**
Never lost a first round singles match at a Grand Slam tournament.	1960–1977	47–0 (100%)	Champions only: Evonne Goolagong, Ann Haydon Jones, Darlene Hard, Maureen Connolly, Nancye Bolton, Helen Wills, Helen Jacobs, and Chris Evert
Years winning at least three Major singles titles	1962–1973	5	Steffi Graf

Grand Slam records per tournament

Time span	Grand Slam tournament records	Players matched
1963, 1965* and 1969*; Australian Championships/Open	Won 3 Triple Crowns (singles, women's doubles and mixed doubles titles at the same tournament)	Daphne Akhurst Cozens; Nancye Wynne Bolton
1973 French Open	Won a French Open singles title as a mother	**Stands alone**
1973 Australian Open — 1973 US Open	Won 3 Grand Slam singles titles as a mother	Kim Clijsters
* - The mixed doubles titles at the 1965 and 1969 tournaments are shared with opposing finalists due to unplayed final matches.

=== Career tournament records ===
Time span	Record accomplished	Players matched
1958–1977	All time women's record of 192 career singles titles	Stands alone
1968–1976	Open era record of 46 career grass court singles titles	Stands alone
1968–1977	Open era career singles match winning percentage (all surfaces) 91.17% (593–56)	Stands alone
1968–1977	Open era career singles match winning percentage (hard court) 91.73% (111–10)	Stands alone
1968–1977	Open era career singles match winning percentage (grass court) 93.01% (293–22)	Stands alone
1970	Open era record of 21 singles titles won in one year	Stands alone
1973	WTA Tour record of 18 singles titles won in one year	Stands alone

== See also ==
- List of female tennis players
- List of Grand Slam related tennis records
- List of tennis rivalries
- List of tennis tournaments
- List of WTA number 1 ranked players
- Tennis records of the Open Era – Women's singles
- World number 1 women tennis players from 1883–present
- Performance timelines for all female tennis players since 1978 who reached at least one Grand Slam final
- WTA Tour records

Records
Preceded by (United States) Helen Wills Moody	Most Career Grand Slam Singles Titles; 1970–present	Succeeded by Incumbent
Preceded by (United States) Maureen Connolly (1953)	Winning a Grand Slam; 1970	Succeeded by (West Germany) Steffi Graf (1988)
