= Carmen Mandarino =

Spanish tennis player (born 1940)

- Full name: Mari Carmen Hernández Mandarino (nee Coronado)
- Country (sports): Spain
- Born: 16 June 1940 (age 84); Madrid, Spain

Singles

Grand Slam singles results
- French Open: 3R (1964)
- Wimbledon: 3R (1961)

Doubles

Grand Slam doubles results
- French Open: 3R (1962, 1965)
- Wimbledon: 3R (1962, 1965, 1970)

Grand Slam mixed doubles results
- French Open: 3R (1962, 1964, 1971)
- Wimbledon: 4R (1961, 1963)

Mari Carmen Hernández Mandarino (born 16 June 1940) is a Spanish former tennis player.

Born in Madrid, Mandarino was one of Spain's top players of the 1960s and 1970s, winning four singles national championships. She won a further 23 national titles in women's doubles and mixed doubles events.

Between 1972 and 1977 she represented Spain in the Federation Cup, featuring in 12 rubbers.

Mandarino, who originally competed under her maiden name Coronado, has been married to Brazilian Davis Cup player José Edison Mandarino since 1965.

== See also ==
- List of Spain Federation Cup team representative
