= Justina Bricka =

American tennis player

- Country (sports): United States
- Born: February 14, 1943 (age 83)
- Plays: Left-handed

Singles
- Career record: –

Grand Slam singles results
- French Open: 4R (1962)
- Wimbledon: QF (1965)
- US Open: 3R (1959, 1964, 1965)

Doubles
- Career record: –

Grand Slam doubles results
- French Open: F (1962)
- Wimbledon: SF (1962)
- US Open: SF (1964)

Grand Slam mixed doubles results
- French Open: 2R (1962)
- Wimbledon: SF (1964)
- US Open: QF (1964)

Justina Bricka (born February 14, 1943) is an American former tennis player from St. Louis, Missouri.

In 1961 she was called up for the United States Wightman Cup team and had a win over Angela Mortimer.

Bricka's best year of doubles came with her partner Margaret Smith in 1962; they won seven tournament titles and had a runner-up finish at the French Championships.

In 1965, she was a singles quarterfinalist at the Wimbledon Championships.

Later in her career, she competed as Justina Horwitz during her marriage to tennis player Dick Horwitz.

== Grand Slam finals ==
=== Doubles (1 runner-up) ===
| Result | Year | Championship | Surface | Partner | Opponents | Score |
|---|---|---|---|---|---|---|
| Loss | 1962 | French Championships | Clay | (Australia) Margaret Smith | (South Africa) Sandra Price (South Africa) Renée Schuurman | 4–6, 4–6 |
