= Lucia Bassi =

Italian tennis player

- Country (sports): Italy
- Born: 12 December 1936 (age 88)

Singles

Grand Slam singles results
- French Open: 3R (1959, 1963)
- Wimbledon: 3R (1962)
- US Open: 2R (1963)

Doubles

Grand Slam doubles results
- French Open: SF (1963)
- Wimbledon: 3R (1966)

Lucia Bassi (born 12 December 1936) is an Italian former tennis player.

Bassi, who won the singles title at the Italian Tennis Championships in 1972, featured in a total of nine Federation Cup ties for Italy, mostly as a doubles player. She was a women's doubles semifinalist at the 1963 French Championships.

== See also ==
- List of Italy Fed Cup team representatives
