= 1966 French Championships (tennis) =

- Date: 23 May – 5 June 1966
- Edition: 65
- Category: 36th Grand Slam (ITF)
- Surface: Clay
- Location: Paris (XVI^{e}), France
- Venue: Stade Roland Garros

Champions

Men's singles
- (Australia) Tony Roche

Women's singles
- (United Kingdom) Ann Jones

Men's doubles
- (United States) Clark Graebner / (United States) Dennis Ralston

Women's doubles
- (Australia) Margaret Smith / (Australia) Judy Tegart

Mixed doubles
- (South Africa) Annette Van Zyl / (South Africa) Frew McMillan
- French Championships

The 1966 French Championships (now known as the French Open) was a tennis tournament that took place on the outdoor clay courts at the Stade Roland-Garros in Paris, France. The tournament ran from 23 May until 5 June. It was the 65th staging of the French Championships, and the second Grand Slam tennis event of 1966. Tony Roche and Ann Jones won the singles titles.

== Finals ==
=== Men's singles ===
(Australia) Tony Roche defeated (Hungary) István Gulyás 6–1, 6–4, 7–5

=== Women's singles ===
(United Kingdom) Ann Jones defeated (United States) Nancy Richey 6–3, 6–1

=== Men's doubles ===
(United States) Clark Graebner / (United States) Dennis Ralston defeated (Romania) Ilie Năstase / (Romania) Ion Țiriac 6–3, 6–3, 6–0

=== Women's doubles ===
(Australia) Margaret Smith / (Australia) Judy Tegart defeated (Australia) Jill Blackman / (Australia) Fay Toyne 4–6, 6–1, 6–1

=== Mixed doubles ===
(South Africa) Annette Van Zyl / (South Africa) Frew McMillan defeated (United Kingdom) Ann Jones / (United States) Clark Graebner 1–6, 6–3, 6–2

Preceded by 1966 Australian Championships	Grand Slams	Succeeded by 1966 Wimbledon Championships
