= Edda Buding =

German tennis player (1936–2014)

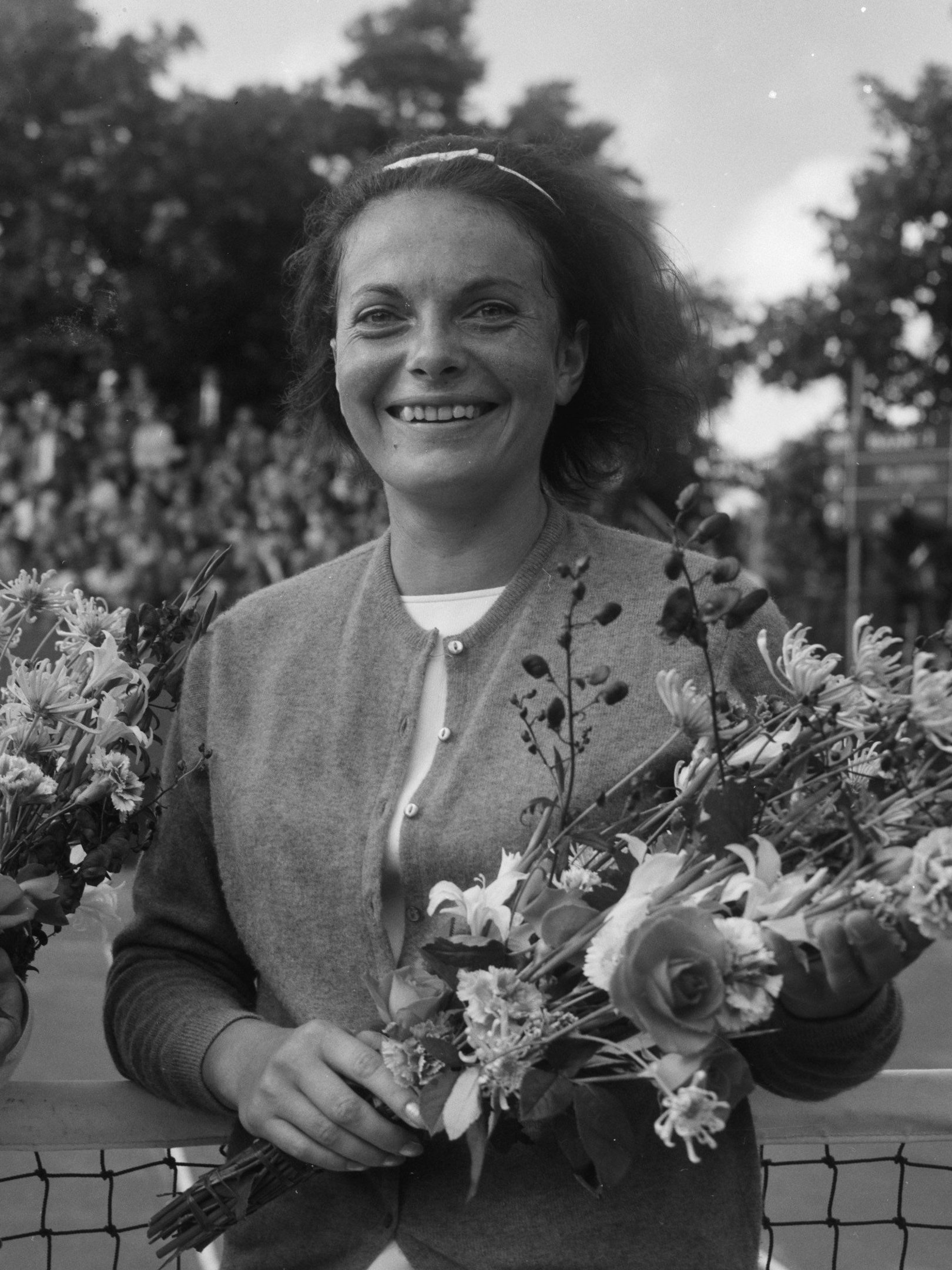
- Buding in 1965
- Full name: Edda Helene Buding-Duchting
- Country (sports): Argentina (1954); West Germany
- Born: 13 November 1936; Lovrin, Romania
- Died: 15 July 2014 (aged 77); Aalen, Germany
- Plays: Right-handed

Singles
- Career record: 26–17
- Career titles: 0

Grand Slam singles results
- French Open: SF (1961)
- Wimbledon: QF (1959)
- US Open: 2R (1961)

Doubles

Grand Slam doubles results
- French Open: SF (1965)
- Wimbledon: SF (1965)
- US Open: F (1961)

Grand Slam mixed doubles results
- French Open: F (1957)
- Wimbledon: F (1961)

Edda Buding (13 November 1936 – 15 July 2014) was a German tennis player of Romanian birth. She received the doubles gold medal at the 1968 Summer Olympics doubles demonstration event partnered with Helga Niessen Masthoff. Along with Yola Ramírez, she was the runner-up in the 1961 U.S. Championships women's doubles event and with Robert Howe was the runner-up in mixed doubles at Wimbledon in 1961. She was the sister of Ingo Buding, a two-time junior singles champion at the French Championships, and Ilse Buding.

She won the 1961 U.S. Women's Clay Court Championships singles title after a three-sets victory in the final against Karen Hantze.

In 1964, she received the Silbernes Lorbeerblatt (Silver Laurel Leaf), the highest sports award in Germany.

Buding is the first opponent to play Chris Evert at the US Open. Evert won their 1971 match 6–1, 6–0.

Buding died in 2014 in Aalen, Germany.

== Grand Slam finals ==
=== Women's doubles: 1 (runner-up) ===
Result	Year	Championship	Surface	Partner	Opponents	Score
Loss	1961	U.S. Championships	Grass	(Mexico) Yola Ramírez	(Australia) Lesley Turner (United States) Darlene Hard	6–4, 5–7, 6–0

=== Mixed doubles: 2 (2 runner-ups) ===
Result	Year	Championship	Surface	Partner	Opponents	Score
Loss	1957	French Championships	Clay	(Chile) Luis Ayala	(Czechoslovakia) Věra Pužejová (Czechoslovakia) Jiří Javorský	6–3, 6–4
Loss	1961	Wimbledon	Grass	(Australia) Robert Howe	(Australia) Fred Stolle (Australia) Lesley Turner	11–9, 6–2

== Other significant finals ==
=== Olympic medal matches: 1 (gold) ===
Year	Location	Partner	Opponents	Score
1968	Mexico	(Germany) Helga Niessen Masthoff	(United States) Julie Heldman (Mexico) Rosie Reyes	6–3, 6–4

=== Fed Cup final ===
Year	German Team	US Team	Score
1966	(Germany) Edda Buding (Germany) Helga Niessen Masthoff (Germany) Helga Hösl Schultze	(United States) Julie Heldman (United States) Billie Jean King (United States) Carole Caldwell Graebner	0–3
