= Rita Bentley =

British tennis player

- Country (sports): Great Britain
- Born: 16 July 1931
- Died: 26 October 2016 (aged 85)
- Turned pro: 1951 (ILTF circuit)
- Retired: 1981

Singles
- Career record: 415–235
- Career titles: 34

Grand Slam singles results
- Australian Open: QF (1963)
- French Open: 3R (1963)
- Wimbledon: 4R (1959, 1960)
- US Open: QF (1967)

Grand Slam doubles results
- Australian Open: QF (1964)
- French Open: 3R (1959, 1962)
- Wimbledon: QF (1964)

Grand Slam mixed doubles results
- Australian Open: QF (1963)
- French Open: 2R (1962)
- Wimbledon: QF (1957, 1960)

Rita Bentley (16 July 1931 - 26 October 2016), Rita Lauder after marriage, was a British tennis player of the 1950s and 1960s. She also played field hockey and represented the England women's national team.

A native of Blackpool, Bentley was a member of Great Britain's 1966 Wightman Cup team, in a squad which included Ann Haydon-Jones and Virginia Wade. She was used for the deciding doubles rubber, which the Americans won.

Bentley twice reached the singles round of 16 at Wimbledon and was the All England Plate winner in 1961. Other career titles include the Queen's Club in 1962 and the Canadian Championships in 1966. She was a singles quarter-finalist at both the 1963 Australian Championships and 1967 U.S. National Championships.
