= Madonna Schacht =

Australian tennis player

- Country (sports): Australia
- Plays: Right-handed

Grand Slam singles results
- Australian Open: QF (1963, 1964, 1966)
- French Open: 4R (1964)
- Wimbledon: 4R (1962, 1966)
- US Open: QF (1966)

Madonna Schacht (born 1940s) is an Australian former tennis player.

== Tennis career ==
Active on tour in the 1960s, Schacht grew up in Gympie, Queensland and attended St Patrick's College.

Schacht went on her first overseas tour in 1962, reaching the round of 16 at Wimbledon on her first attempt.

During her career she was a three-time singles quarter-finalist at the Australian Championships and a quarter-finalist at the 1966 U.S. National Championships. Her title wins include the 1962 Irish Championships (singles) and 1965 Italian Championships (doubles).

== Personal life ==
Schacht was involved in a high-profile custody battle in the 1970s with her former husband Dr Rudi Weber, a Monash University physicist. Weber, from whom she was separated, had taken her infant son to live with him in Europe. She was eventually able to regain custody after a year-long legal fight.

== See also ==
- List of Grand Slam girls' doubles champions
