= 1962 French Championships (tennis) =

Tennis tournament

- Date: 21 May – 2 June 1962
- Edition: 61
- Category: 32nd Grand Slam (ITF)
- Surface: Clay
- Location: Paris (XVI^{e}), France
- Venue: Stade Roland Garros

Champions

Men's singles
- (Australia) Rod Laver

Women's singles
- (Australia) Margaret Smith

Men's doubles
- (Australia) Roy Emerson / (Australia) Neale Fraser

Women's doubles
- (South Africa) Sandra Reynolds / (South Africa) Renee Schuurman

Mixed doubles
- (South Africa) Renée Schuurman / (Australia) Bob Howe
- French Championships

The 1962 French Championships (now known as the French Open) was a tennis tournament that took place on the outdoor clay courts at the Stade Roland-Garros in Paris, France. The tournament ran from 21 May until 2 June. It was the 61st staging of the French Championships, and the second Grand Slam tennis event of 1962. Rod Laver and Margaret Smith won the singles titles.

== Finals ==
=== Men's singles ===
(Australia) Rod Laver defeated (Australia) Roy Emerson 3–6, 2–6, 6–3, 9–7, 6–2

=== Women's singles ===
(Australia) Margaret Smith defeated (Australia) Lesley Turner 6–3, 3–6, 7–5

=== Men's doubles ===
(Australia) Roy Emerson / (Australia) Neale Fraser defeated (West Germany) Wilhelm Bungert / (West Germany) Christian Kuhnke 6–3, 6–4, 7–5

=== Women's doubles ===
(South Africa) Sandra Price / (South Africa) Renée Schuurman defeated (United States) Justina Bricka / (Australia) Margaret Smith 6–4, 6–4

=== Mixed doubles ===
(South Africa) Renée Schuurman / (Australia) Bob Howe defeated (Australia) Lesley Turner / (Australia) Fred Stolle 3–6, 6–4, 6–4

Preceded by 1962 Australian Championships	Grand Slams	Succeeded by 1962 Wimbledon Championships
