= 1968 Wimbledon Championships – Women's doubles =

Women's doubles
- 1968 Wimbledon Championships

Final
- Champions: (United States) Rosie Casals (United States) Billie Jean King
- Runners-up: (France) Françoise Dürr (United Kingdom) Ann Jones
- Score: 3–6, 6–4, 7–5

Details
- Draw: 48 (4 Q )
- Seeds: 4

Events
| Singles | men | women | | boys | girls |
| Doubles | men | women | mixed | boys | girls |
| ← 1967 · | Wimbledon Championships | · 1969 → |

Rosemary Casals and Billie Jean King successfully defended their title, defeating Françoise Dürr and Ann Jones in the final, 3–6, 6–4, 7–5 to win the ladies' doubles tennis title at the 1968 Wimbledon Championships.

== Seeds ==
1. (United States) Rosie Casals / (United States) Billie Jean King (champions)
2. (Brazil) Maria Bueno / (United States) Nancy Richey (third round)
3. (France) Françoise Dürr / (United Kingdom) Ann Jones (final)
4. (Australia) Lesley Bowrey / (Australia) Judy Tegart (semifinals)

Click on the seed number of a player to go to their draw section.

== Draw ==
=== Key ===
- Q = Qualifier
- WC = Wild card
- LL = Lucky loser
- Alt = Alternate
- ITF = ITF entry
- PR = Protected ranking
- SR = Special ranking
- SE = Special exempt
- JE = Junior exempt
- JR = Junior Accelerator Programme entrant
- CO = College Accelerator Programme entrant
- NG = Next Gen Accelerator Program entrant
- w/o = Walkover
- r = Retired
- d = Defaulted

=== Finals ===
Quarterfinals
1 | (United States) Rosie Casals (United States) Billie Jean King | 6 | 3 | 6
(Australia) Margaret Court (United Kingdom) Virginia Wade | 4 | 6 | 3
4 | (Australia) Lesley Bowrey (Australia) Judy Tegart | 4 | 6 | 6
(United Kingdom) Winnie Shaw (United Kingdom) Joyce Williams | 6 | 4 | 2
(United States) Mary-Ann Eisel (United States) Kathleen Harter | 1 | 1
3 | (France) Françoise Dürr (United Kingdom) Ann Jones | 6 | 6
(United Kingdom) Robin Lloyd (United Kingdom) Frances MacLennan | 6 | 6
(West Germany) Helga Niessen (West Germany) Heide Orth | 1 | 3

Semifinals
1 | (United States) Rosie Casals (United States) Billie Jean King | 1 | 6 | 10
4 | (Australia) Lesley Bowrey (Australia) Judy Tegart | 6 | 1 | 8
3 | (France) Françoise Dürr (United Kingdom) Ann Jones | 6 | 6
(United Kingdom) Robin Lloyd (United Kingdom) Frances MacLennan | 1 | 0

Final
1 | (United States) Rosie Casals (United States) Billie Jean King | 3 | 6 | 7
3 | (France) Françoise Dürr (United Kingdom) Ann Jones | 6 | 4 | 5

=== Top half ===
==== Section 1 ====
First round

Second round
1 | (United States) R Casals (United States) Billie Jean King | 6 | 7
(South Africa) A du Plooy (South Africa) P Walkden | 2 | 5
(Sweden) K Bartholdson (Sweden) C Sandberg | 2 | 4
(United States) C Martinez (United States) K Pigeon | 6 | 6
(Italy) L Bassi (France) C Spinoza | 1 | 2
(West Germany) E Buding (West Germany) H Schultze | 6 | 6
Q | (Japan) J Sawamatsu (Japan) K Sawamatsu | 3 | 1
(Australia) M Court (United Kingdom) V Wade | 6 | 6

Third round
1 | (United States) R Casals (United States) BJ King | 10 | 6
(United States) C Martinez (United States) K Pigeon | 8 | 0
(West Germany) Edda Buding (West Germany) H Schultze | 3 | 1
(Australia) M Court (United Kingdom) V Wade | 6 | 6

Quarterfinals
1 | (United States) R Casals (United States) BJ King | 6 | 3 | 6
(Australia) M Court (United Kingdom) V Wade | 4 | 6 | 3

==== Section 2 ====
First round
4 | (Australia) L Bowrey (Australia) J Tegart | 6 | 6
(United Kingdom) A Barrett (United Kingdom) P Roberts | 2 | 4
(Belgium) I Loeys (Belgium) C Mercelis | 3 | 6 | 2
(United States) D Hart (United States) E Pratt | 6 | 2 | 6
(United States) J Bartkowicz (United States) S DeFina
(Sweden) I Löfdahl (France) M Salfati | w/o
(United States) P Hogan (United States) V Ziegenfuss | 6 | 7
Q | (United Kingdom) S Brasher (United States) P Mattes | 2 | 5
(Netherlands) A Bakker (Netherlands) A Suurbeek | 6 | 7
(United Kingdom) J Congdon (United Kingdom) L Greville-Collins | 3 | 5
(Italy) M Giorgi (Italy) MT Riedl | 2 | 2
Q | (Peru) V Cáceres (Argentina) R Giscafré | 6 | 6
(United Kingdom) W Shaw (United Kingdom) J Williams | 6 | 8
(Australia) G Sherriff (Australia) C Sherriff | 0 | 6
(United Kingdom) R Bentley (South Africa) B Vukovich | 5 | 2
(United States) J Heldman (Australia) F Moore | 7 | 6

Second round
4 | (Australia) L Bowrey (Australia) J Tegart | 6 | 6
(United States) D Hart (United States) E Pratt | 0 | 4
(Sweden) I Löfdahl (France) M Salfati | 4 | 3
(United States) P Hogan (United States) V Ziegenfuss | 6 | 6
(Netherlands) A Bakker (Netherlands) A Suurbeek | 6 | 6
Q | (Peru) V Cáceres (Argentina) R Giscafré | 2 | 1
(United Kingdom) W Shaw (United Kingdom) J Williams | 6 | 1 | 6
(United States) J Heldman (Australia) F Moore | 3 | 6 | 3

Third round
4 | (Australia) L Bowrey (Australia) J Tegart | 11 | 8 | 6
(United States) P Hogan (United States) V Ziegenfuss | 13 | 6 | 2
(Netherlands) A Bakker (Netherlands) A Suurbeek | 2 | 4
(United Kingdom) W Shaw (United Kingdom) J Williams | 6 | 6

Quarterfinals
4 | (Australia) L Bowrey (Australia) J Tegart | 4 | 6 | 6
(United Kingdom) W Shaw (United Kingdom) J Williams | 6 | 4 | 2

=== Bottom half ===
==== Section 3 ====
First round
(Australia) K Harris (Australia) L Hunt | 6 | 7
(United States) A Tym (Argentina) M Vrancovich | 3 | 5
(Sweden) E Lundqvist (France) É Terras | 4 | 3
(United States) M-A Eisel (United States) K Harter | 6 | 6
(United States) M Aschner (United States) V Rogers | 6 | 7
(United Kingdom) C Janes (United Kingdom) E Truman | 3 | 5
(South Africa) E Emmanuel (South Africa) M Godwin | 6 | 6
(Sweden) E Andersson (Sweden) M Pegel | 3 | 2
(Australia) K Krantzcke (Australia) K Melville | 6 | 6
(Netherlands) M Jansen (Netherlands) J Salomé | 3 | 1
(United Kingdom) A Soady (United Kingdom) J Townsend | 4 | 6 | 7
(Czechoslovakia) J Volavková (Czechoslovakia) V Vopičková | 6 | 1 | 5
(Canada) V Berner (Canada) F Urban | 6 | 6
(Australia) H Gourlay (South Africa) L Rossouw | 1 | 4
(France) R Darmon (France) J Lieffrig | 4 | 2
3 | (France) F Dürr (United Kingdom) A Jones | 6 | 6

Second round
(Australia) K Harris (Australia) L Hunt | 4 | 6 | 2
(United States) M-A Eisel (United States) K Harter | 6 | 4 | 6
(United States) M Aschner (United States) V Rogers | 6 | 8
(South Africa) E Emmanuel (South Africa) M Godwin | 3 | 6
(Australia) K Krantzcke (Australia) K Melville | 6 | 6
(United Kingdom) A Soady (United Kingdom) J Townsend | 1 | 2
(Canada) V Berner (Canada) F Urban | 1 | 1
3 | (France) F Dürr (United Kingdom) A Jones | 6 | 6

Third round
(United States) M-A Eisel (United States) K Harter | 6 | 6
(United States) M Aschner (United States) V Rogers | 1 | 1
(Australia) K Krantzcke (Australia) K Melville | 3 | 5
3 | (France) F Dürr (United Kingdom) A Jones | 6 | 7

Quarterfinals
(United States) M-A Eisel (United States) K Harter | 1 | 1
3 | (France) F Dürr (United Kingdom) A Jones | 6 | 6

==== Section 4 ====
First round

Second round
(Italy) F Gordigiani (Italy) L Pericoli
Q | (United Kingdom) J Knight (United Kingdom) P Roberts | w/o
(South Africa) V Forbes (South Africa) H Segal | 2 | 5
(United Kingdom) R Lloyd (United Kingdom) F MacLennan | 6 | 7
(West Germany) H Niessen (West Germany) H Orth | 6 | 6
(Netherlands) L Jansen Venneboer (Mexico) E Subirats | 3 | 0
(Soviet Union) Galina Baksheeva (Soviet Union) Olga Morozova | 4 | 2
2 | (Brazil) Maria Bueno (United States) Nancy Richey | 6 | 6

Third round
Q | (United Kingdom) J Knight (United Kingdom) P Roberts | 2 | 4
(United Kingdom) R Lloyd (United Kingdom) F MacLennan | 6 | 6
(West Germany) H Niessen (West Germany) H Orth | w/o
2 | (Brazil) M Bueno (United States) N Richey

Quarterfinals
(United Kingdom) R Lloyd (United Kingdom) F MacLennan | 6 | 6
(West Germany) H Niessen (Germany) H Orth | 1 | 3
