= 1968 Federation Cup (tennis) =

International women's tennis competition

Details
- Duration: 21 – 26 May
- Edition: 6th

Champion
- Winning nation: Australia

The 1968 Federation Cup was the sixth edition of what is now known as the Fed Cup. 23 nations participated in the tournament, which was held at Stade Roland Garros in Paris, France, from 21–26 May. Australia defeated the Netherlands in the final, in what was the first final not featuring United States, giving Australia their third title.

== Participating teams ==
Participating teams
Australia	Belgium	Brazil	Bulgaria	Canada	Chile
Czechoslovakia	France	Finland	Great Britain	Greece	Italy
Mexico	Netherlands	Norway	Poland	Portugal	South Africa
Soviet Union	Sweden	Switzerland	United States	West Germany	

== Draw ==
All ties were played at Stade Roland Garros in Paris, France on clay courts. |}

First Round; 21 May
Czechoslovakia	2
Norway	0
Great Britain	3
Sweden	0
Soviet Union	3
Belgium	0
Italy	2
Mexico	1
Netherlands	3
Finland	0
Poland	2
Greece	0
Bulgaria	2
Chile	1

Second Round; 22–23 May
Australia	3
Brazil	0
South Africa	3
Canada	0
Czechoslovakia	1
Great Britain	2
Soviet Union	3
Italy	0
Netherlands	2
Poland	1
Bulgaria
West Germany	w/o
France	3
Portugal	0
Switzerland	0
United States	3

Quarterfinals; 24 May
Australia	2
South Africa	1
Soviet Union	0
Great Britain	3
Netherlands	3
Bulgaria	0
France	1
United States	2

Semifinals; 25 May
Australia	3
Great Britain	0
Netherlands	2
United States	1

Final; 26 May
Australia	3
Netherlands	0

=== First round ===
Czechoslovakia vs. Norway

Czechoslovakia
2
Stade Roland Garros, Paris, France
21 May 1968
Clay

Norway
0

			1	2	3
1	(Czechoslovakia) (Norway)	Vlasta Vopičková; Kirsten Robsahm	6; 0	6; 4
2	(Czechoslovakia) (Norway)	Jitka Volavková; Ellen Grindvold	6; 3	6; 3
3	(Czechoslovakia) (Norway)					not played

Great Britain vs. Sweden

Great Britain
3
Stade Roland Garros, Paris, France
21 May 1968
Clay

Sweden
0

			1	2	3
1	(United Kingdom) (Sweden)	Christine Janes; Ingrid Löfdahl	6; 2	6; 0
2	(United Kingdom) (Sweden)	Virginia Wade; Christina Sandberg	6; 1	6; 4
3	(United Kingdom) (Sweden)	Winnie Shaw / Virginia Wade; Ingrid Löfdahl / Christina Sandberg	2; 6	6; 3	6; 4

Soviet Union vs. Belgium

Soviet Union
3
Stade Roland Garros, Paris, France
21 May 1968
Clay

Belgium
0

			1	2	3
1	(Soviet Union) (Belgium)	Galina Baksheeva; Ingrid Loeys	2; 6	7; 5	6; 3
2	(Soviet Union) (Belgium)	Anna Dmitrieva; Christiane Mercelis	6; 3	6; 3
3	(Soviet Union) (Belgium)	Galina Baksheeva / Anna Dmitrieva; Ingrid Loeys / Christiane Mercelis	6; 4	6; 1

Italy vs. Mexico

Italy
2
Stade Roland Garros, Paris, France
21 May 1968
Clay

Mexico
1

			1	2	3
1	(Italy) (Mexico)	Lea Pericoli; Elena Subirats	3; 6	1; 6
2	(Italy) (Mexico)	Maria Teresa Riedl; Patricia Montaño	6; 4	6; 4
3	(Italy) (Mexico)	Lea Pericoli / Maria Teresa Riedl; Patricia Montaño / Elena Subirats	6; 4	6; 2

Netherlands vs. Finland

Netherlands
3
Stade Roland Garros, Paris, France
21 May 1968
Clay

Finland
0

			1	2	3
1	(Netherlands) (Finland)	Marijke Jansen; Birgitta Lindström	6; 4	6; 2
2	(Netherlands) (Finland)	Lidy Venneboer; Christina Lindström	4; 6	6; 4	6; 2
3	(Netherlands) (Finland)	Marijke Jansen / Lidy Venneboer; Birgitta Lindström / Christina Lindström	6; 4	6; 4

Poland vs. Greece

Poland
2
Stade Roland Garros, Paris, France
21 May 1968
Clay

Greece
0

			1	2	3
1	(Poland) (Greece)	Danuta Wieczorek; Dionissia Asteri	3; 6	6; 0	6; 2
2	(Poland) (Greece)	Barbara Olszewska; Carol-Ann Kalgeropoulos	4; 6	6; 2	6; 2
3	(Poland) (Greece)					not played

Bulgaria vs. Chile

Bulgaria
2
Stade Roland Garros, Paris, France
21 May 1968
Clay

Chile
1

			1	2	3
1	(Bulgaria) (Chile)	Lubka Radkova; Michelle Rodríguez	3; 6	2; 6
2	(Bulgaria) (Chile)	Maria Chakarova; Margarita de Zuleta	6; 0	6; 0
3	(Bulgaria) (Chile)	Maria Chakarova / Lubka Radkova; Margarita de Zuleta / Michelle Rodríguez	6; 1	6; 2

=== Second round ===
Australia vs. Brazil

Australia
3
Stade Roland Garros, Paris, France
22 May 1968
Clay

Brazil
0

			1	2	3
1	(Australia) (Brazil)	Margaret Court; Suzana Petersen	6; 0	6; 0
2	(Australia) (Brazil)	Kerry Melville; Maria Cristina Borba Dias	6; 2	6; 1
3	(Australia) (Brazil)	Margaret Court / Kerry Melville; Maria Cristina Borba Dias / Suzana Petersen	6; 0	6; 2

South Africa vs. Canada

South Africa
3
Stade Roland Garros, Paris, France
22 May 1968
Clay

Canada
0

			1	2	3
1	(South Africa) (Canada)	Annette Du Plooy; Faye Urban	3; 6	6; 4	6; 2
2	(South Africa) (Canada)	Maryna Godwin; Vicki Berner	9; 7	6; 3
3	(South Africa) (Canada)	Annette Du Plooy / Maryna Godwin; Vicki Berner / Faye Urban	6; 1	6; 2

Czechoslovakia vs. Great Britain

Czechoslovakia
1
Stade Roland Garros, Paris, France
22 May 1968
Clay

Great Britain
2

			1	2	3
1	(Czechoslovakia) (United Kingdom)	Jitka Volavková; Christine Janes	4; 6	6; 4	4; 6
2	(Czechoslovakia) (United Kingdom)	Vlasta Vopičková; Virginia Wade	6; 3	6; 4
3	(Czechoslovakia) (United Kingdom)	Jitka Volavková / Vlasta Vopičková; Winnie Shaw / Virginia Wade	6; 3	5; 7	5; 7

Soviet Union vs. Italy

Soviet Union
3
Stade Roland Garros, Paris, France
22 May 1968
Clay

Italy
0

			1	2	3
1	(Soviet Union) (Italy)	Galina Baksheeva; Lea Pericoli	7; 5	8; 6
2	(Soviet Union) (Italy)	Anna Dmitrieva; Maria Teresa Riedl	6; 3	6; 0
3	(Soviet Union) (Italy)	Galina Baksheeva / Olga Morozova; Francesca Gordigiani / Lea Pericoli	6; 2	6; 3

Netherlands vs. Poland

Netherlands
2
Stade Roland Garros, Paris, France
23 May 1968
Clay

Poland
1

			1	2	3
1	(Netherlands) (Poland)	Marijke Jansen; Barbara Olszewska	6; 1	6; 1
2	(Netherlands) (Poland)	Astrid Suurbeek; Danuta Wieczorek	6; 4	4; 6	4; 6
3	(Netherlands) (Poland)	Astrid Suurbeek / Lidy Venneboer; Barbara Olszewska / Danuta Wieczorek	8; 6	7; 5

France vs. Portugal

France
3
Stade Roland Garros, Paris, France
23 May 1968
Clay

Portugal
0

			1	2	3
1	(France) (Portugal)	Monique Salfati; Peggy Brixhe	6; 0	6; 0
2	(France) (Portugal)	Rosie Darmon; Leonora Santos	6; 2	6; 1
3	(France) (Portugal)	Rosie Darmon / Janine Lieffrig; Maria-Carmen Arnoso / Peggy Brixhe	6; 1	6; 2

Switzerland vs. United States

Switzerland
0
Stade Roland Garros, Paris, France
23 May 1968
Clay

United States
3

			1	2	3
1	(Switzerland) (United States)	Anne-Marie Studer; Nancy Richey	1; 6	1; 6
2	(Switzerland) (United States)	Marianne Kindler; Mary-Ann Eisel	0; 6	1; 6
3	(Switzerland) (United States)	Marianne Kindler / Anne-Marie Studer; Mary-Ann Eisel / Kathleen Harter	0; 6	2; 6

=== Quarterfinals ===
Australia vs. South Africa

Australia
2
Stade Roland Garros, Paris, France
24 May 1968
Clay

South Africa
1

			1	2	3
1	(Australia) (South Africa)	Margaret Court; Annette Du Plooy	6; 1	6; 1
2	(Australia) (South Africa)	Kerry Melville; Maryna Godwin	6; 2	6; 3
3	(Australia) (South Africa)	Margaret Court / Kerry Melville; Annette Du Plooy / Maryna Godwin	4; 6	6; 2	2; 6

Great Britain vs. Soviet Union

Great Britain
3
Stade Roland Garros, Paris, France
24 May 1968
Clay

Soviet Union
0

			1	2	3
1	(United Kingdom) (Soviet Union)	Christine Janes; Anna Dmitrieva	1; 6	6; 4	9; 7
2	(United Kingdom) (Soviet Union)	Virginia Wade; Galina Baksheeva	6; 1	6; 1
3	(United Kingdom) (Soviet Union)	Winnie Shaw / Virginia Wade; Galina Baksheeva / Anna Dmitrieva	6; 4	6; 3

Netherlands vs. Bulgaria

Netherlands
3
Stade Roland Garros, Paris, France
24 May 1968
Clay

Bulgaria
0

			1	2	3
1	(Netherlands) (Bulgaria)	Astrid Suurbeek; Lubka Radkova	6; 1	6; 3
2	(Netherlands) (Bulgaria)	Marijke Jansen; Maria Chakarova	6; 1	6; 0
3	(Netherlands) (Bulgaria)	Marijke Jansen / Astrid Suurbeek; Yulia Berberian / Lubka Radkova	6; 1	6; 1

France vs. United States

France
1
Stade Roland Garros, Paris, France
24 May 1968
Clay

United States
2

			1	2	3
1	(France) (United States)	Rosie Darmon; Mary-Ann Eisel	7; 5	6; 1
2	(France) (United States)	Monique Salfati; Nancy Richey	1; 6	4; 6
3	(France) (United States)	Rosie Darmon / Janine Lieffrig; Mary-Ann Eisel / Nancy Richey	4; 6	6; 4	2; 6

=== Semifinals ===
Australia vs. Great Britain

Australia
3
Stade Roland Garros, Paris, France
25 May 1968
Clay

Great Britain
0

			1	2	3
1	(Australia) (United Kingdom)	Kerry Melville; Christine Janes	7; 5	6; 1
2	(Australia) (United Kingdom)	Margaret Court; Virginia Wade	6; 2	6; 2
3	(Australia) (United Kingdom)	Margaret Court / Kerry Melville; Winnie Shaw / Virginia Wade	9; 7	3; 6	14; 12

- The doubles rubber for this tie holds the Fed Cup record for the most games (pre-tiebreak), with 51

Netherlands vs. United States

Netherlands
2
Stade Roland Garros, Paris, France
25 May 1968
Clay

United States
1

			1	2	3
1	(Netherlands) (United States)	Lidy Venneboer; Nancy Richey	2; 6	3; 6
2	(Netherlands) (United States)	Marijke Jansen; Mary-Ann Eisel	7; 5	6; 0
3	(Netherlands) (United States)	Astrid Suurbeek / Lidy Venneboer; Mary-Ann Eisel / Nancy Richey	3; 6	8; 6	6; 0

=== Final ===
Australia vs. Netherlands

Australia
3
Stade Roland Garros, Paris, France
26 May 1968
Clay

Netherlands
0

			1	2	3
1	(Australia) (Netherlands)	Kerry Melville; Marijke Jansen	4; 6	7; 5	6; 3
2	(Australia) (Netherlands)	Margaret Court; Astrid Suurbeek	6; 1	6; 3
3	(Australia) (Netherlands)	Margaret Court / Kerry Melville; Astrid Suurbeek / Lidy Venneboer	6; 3	6; 8	7; 5
