= 1967 Wimbledon Championships – Women's doubles =

Women's doubles
- 1967 Wimbledon Championships

Final
- Champions: (United States) Rosie Casals (United States) Billie Jean King
- Runners-up: (Brazil) Maria Bueno (United States) Nancy Richey
- Score: 9–11, 6–4, 6–2

Details
- Draw: 48 (4Q)
- Seeds: 4

Events
Singles	men	women		boys	girls
Doubles	men	women	mixed	boys	girls
← 1966 ·	Wimbledon Championships	· 1968 →

Rosie Casals and Billie Jean King defeated the defending champions Maria Bueno and Nancy Richey in the final, 9–11, 6–4, 6–2 to win the ladies' doubles tennis title at the 1967 Wimbledon Championships.

== Seeds ==
1. (Brazil) Maria Bueno / (United States) Nancy Richey (final)
2. (United Kingdom) Ann Jones / (United Kingdom) Virginia Wade (semifinals)
3. (United States) Rosie Casals / (United States) Billie Jean King (champions)
4. (Australia) Judy Tegart / (Australia) Lesley Turner (semifinals)

Click on the seed number of a player to go to their draw section.

== Draw ==
Key

- Q = Qualifier
- WC = Wild card
- LL = Lucky loser
- Alt = Alternate
- ITF = ITF entry
- PR = Protected ranking
- SR = Special ranking
- SE = Special exempt
- JE = Junior exempt
- JR = Junior Accelerator Programme entrant
- CO = College Accelerator Programme entrant
- NG = Next Gen Accelerator Program entrant
- w/o = Walkover
- r = Retired
- d = Defaulted

=== Finals ===
Quarterfinals
1	(Brazil) Maria Bueno (United States) Nancy Richey	8	6
(France) Françoise Dürr (Australia) Gail Sherriff	6	0
4	(Australia) Judy Tegart (Australia) Lesley Turner	6	6
(Canada) Vicki Berner (Canada) Faye Urban	2	3
(Australia) Karen Krantzcke (Australia) Kerry Melville	1	3
3	(United States) Rosie Casals (United States) Billie Jean King	6	6
(Soviet Union) Galina Baksheeva (Soviet Union) Anna Dmitrieva	2	6
2	(United Kingdom) Ann Jones (United Kingdom) Virginia Wade	6	8

Semifinals
1	(Brazil) Maria Bueno (United States) Nancy Richey	4	6	6
4	(Australia) Judy Tegart (Australia) Lesley Turner	6	4	4
3	(United States) Rosie Casals (United States) Billie Jean King	6	6
2	(United Kingdom) Ann Jones (United Kingdom) Virginia Wade	1	4

Final
1	(Brazil) Maria Bueno (United States) Nancy Richey	11	4	2
3	(United States) Rosie Casals (United States) Billie Jean King	9	6	6

=== Top half ===
==== Section 1 ====
First round

Second round
1	(Brazil) Maria Bueno (United States) Nancy Richey	6	6
(Italy) Roberta Beltrame (Italy) Francesca Gordigiani	1	1
(United Kingdom) Winnie Shaw (United Kingdom) Joyce Williams	6	6
(United Kingdom) Lorna Greville-Collins (United Kingdom) Robin Lloyd	4	0
(South Africa) Jean Forbes (South Africa) Heather Segal	1	2
(France) Françoise Dürr (Australia) Gail Sherriff	6	6
(Sweden) EE Andersson (Sweden) Madelaine Pegel	3	8
(Netherlands) Lidy Jansen-Venneboer (Netherlands) Betty Stöve	6	10

Third round
1	(Brazil) M Bueno (United States) N Richey	6	6
(United Kingdom) W Shaw (United Kingdom) J Williams	1	2
(France) F Dürr (Australia) G Sherriff	6	6
(Netherlands) L Jansen-Venneboer (Netherlands) B Stöve	2	1

Quarterfinals
1	(Brazil) M Bueno (United States) N Richey	8	6
(France) F Dürr (Australia) G Sherriff	6	0

==== Section 2 ====
First round
4	(Australia) Judy Tegart (Australia) Lesley Turner	6	6
(United Kingdom) Frances MacLennan (Netherlands) Elsie Veentjer-Spruyt	2	1
(South Africa) Greta Delport (South Africa) Laura Rossouw	7	4	3
(United States) Carol Aucamp (United States) Mary-Ann Eisel	5	6	6
(United Kingdom) Rita Bentley (United Kingdom) Julie Wilson
(Belgium) Ingrid Loeys (Belgium) Christiane Mercelis	w/o
(South Africa) Glenda Swan (Australia) Fay Toyne	3	1
(United States) Kathy Blake (United States) Kathleen Harter	6	6
(Australia) Carol Sherriff (France) Évelyne Terras	6	6	5
Q	(United Kingdom) Jean Knight (United Kingdom) Pat Roberts	8	2	7
Q	(United Kingdom) Elizabeth Ernest (United Kingdom) Sue Mappin	2	1
(Australia) Helen Gourlay (Australia) Jan O'Neill	6	6
(Canada) Vicki Berner (Canada) Faye Urban	6	5	6
(United States) Lynn Abbes (United States) Ceci Martinez	0	7	4
Q	(United Kingdom) Anthea Rigby (United Kingdom) Sue Tutt	7	4
(United States) Tory Fretz (United States) Stephanie DeFina	9	6

Second round
4	(Australia) J Tegart (Australia) L Turner	7	6
(United States) C Aucamp (United States) M-A Eisel	5	3
(United Kingdom) R Bentley (United Kingdom) J Wilson	4	2
(United States) K Blake (United States) K Harter	6	6
Q	(United Kingdom) J Knight (United Kingdom) P Roberts	5	3
(Australia) H Gourlay (Australia) J O'Neill	7	6
(Canada) V Berner (Canada) F Urban	7	6
(United States) T Fretz (United States) S DeFina	5	3

Third round
4	(Australia) J Tegart (Australia) L Turner	4	6	6
(United States) K Blake (United States) K Harter	6	1	3
(Australia) H Gourlay (Australia) J O'Neill	2	4
(Canada) V Berner (Canada) F Urban	6	6

Quarterfinals
4	(Australia) J Tegart (Australia) L Turner	6	6
(Canada) V Berner (Canada) F Urban	2	3

=== Bottom half ===
==== Section 3 ====
First round
(Rhodesia) Pat Walkden (South Africa) Annette Van Zyl	2	13	1
(Australia) Karen Krantzcke (Australia) Kerry Melville	6	11	6
(Australia) Sue Alexander (Australia) Therese Mackay	6	6	7
(Czechoslovakia) Jitka Volavková (Czechoslovakia) Vlasta Vopičková	4	8	5
(United States) Carol-Ann Kalogeropoulos (France) Michelle Rodríguez	2	6	2
(United States) Susan Behlmar (United States) Nancy Reed	6	3	6
(Australia) Joan Cottrill (Australia) Carol Langsford
(Italy) Silvana Lazzarino (Italy) Lea Pericoli	w/o
(United Kingdom) Christine Truman (United Kingdom) Nell Truman	6	6
(United Kingdom) Heather Allen (South Africa) Anita van Deventer	2	2
(United States) Donna Fales (United States) Betty Pratt	6	6
(United States) Dorothy Knode (France) Isabelle de Lansalut	2	2
(Sweden) Ingrid Löfdahl (France) Monique Salfati	6	6
(United Kingdom) Lynne Cullen-Smith (United Kingdom) Elizabeth Tew	2	2
(Netherlands) Ada Bakker (Netherlands) Astrid Suurbeek	1	1
3	(United States) Rosie Casals (United States) Billie Jean King	6	6

Second round
(Australia) K Krantzcke (Australia) K Melville	6	6
(Australia) S Alexander (Australia) T Mackay	4	1
(United States) S Behlmar (United States) N Reed	4	6	6
(Australia) J Cottrill (Australia) C Langsford	6	2	3
(United Kingdom) C Truman (United Kingdom) E Truman	9	3
(United States) D Fales (United States) E Pratt	11	6
(Sweden) I Löfdahl (France) M Salfati	3	2
3	(United States) R Casals (United States) BJ King	6	6

Third round
(Australia) K Krantzcke (Australia) K Melville	6	6
(United States) S Behlmar (United States) N Reed	2	0
(United States) D Fales (United States) E Pratt	4	2
3	(United States) R Casals (United States) BJ King	6	6

Quarterfinals
(Australia) K Krantzcke (Australia) K Melville	1	3
3	(United States) Rosie Casals (United States) Billie Jean King	6	6

==== Section 4 ====
First round

Second round
(South Africa) Esmé Emmanuel (South Africa) Maryna Godwin	6	6
(United Kingdom) Alex Soady (United Kingdom) Janice Townsend	2	4
(United Kingdom) Angela Barrett (United Kingdom) Pauline Roberts	2	2
(Soviet Union) Galina Baksheeva (Soviet Union) Anna Dmitrieva	6	6
(Sweden) Eva Lundqvist (Sweden) Ulla Sandulf	1	3
(West Germany) Edda Buding (Netherlands) Trudy Groenman	6	6
Q	(Australia) Margaret Harris (United Kingdom) Sally Holdsworth	4	2
2	(United Kingdom) Ann Jones (United Kingdom) Virginia Wade	6	6

Third round
(South Africa) E Emmanuel (South Africa) M Godwin	5	0
(Soviet Union) G Baksheeva (Soviet Union) A Dmitrieva	7	6
(West Germany) E Buding (Netherlands) G Groenman	2	1
2	(United Kingdom) A Jones (United Kingdom) V Wade	6	6

Quarterfinals
(Soviet Union) G Baksheeva (Soviet Union) A Dmitrieva	2	6
2	(United Kingdom) A Jones (United Kingdom) V Wade	6	8
