= 1968 French Open – Women's doubles =

Women's doubles
- 1968 French Open

Final
- Champion: (France) Françoise Dürr (United Kingdom) Ann Jones
- Runner-up: (United States) Rosie Casals (United States) Billie Jean King
- Score: 7–5, 4–6, 6–4

Details
- Draw: 32
- Seeds: 8

Events
Singles	men	women		boys	girls
Doubles	men	women	mixed	boys	girls
WC Singles	men	women	quad
WC Doubles	men	women	quad
Legends	−45	45+	women
- French Open

The women's doubles tournament at the 1968 French Open was held from 27 May to 9 June 1968 on the outdoor clay courts at the Stade Roland Garros in Paris, France. The second-seeded team of Françoise Dürr and Ann Jones won the title, defeating the first-seeded pair of Rosie Casals and Billie Jean King in the final in three sets.

== Seeds ==
1. (United States) Rosie Casals / (United States) Billie Jean King (finalists)
2. (France) Françoise Dürr / (United Kingdom) Ann Jones (champions)
3. (Brazil) Maria Bueno / (United States) Nancy Richey (semifinalists)
4. (South Africa) Annette du Plooy / (South Africa) Pat Walkden (semifinalists)
5. (Australia) Karen Krantzcke / (Australia) Kerry Melville (second round)
6. (Soviet Union) Galina Baksheeva / (Soviet Union) Anna Dmitrieva (Quarterfinalists)
7. (Czechoslovakia) Jitka Volavková / (Czechoslovakia) Vlasta Vopičková (second round)
8. (West Germany) Edda Buding / (West Germany) Ilse Buding (second round)

== Draw ==
Key

- Q = Qualifier
- WC = Wild card
- LL = Lucky loser
- Alt = Alternate
- ITF = ITF entry
- PR = Protected ranking
- SR = Special ranking
- SE = Special exempt
- JE = Junior exempt
- JR = Junior Accelerator Programme entrant
- CO = College Accelerator Programme entrant
- NG = Next Gen Accelerator Program entrant
- w/o = Walkover
- r = Retired
- d = Defaulted

=== Finals ===
Semifinals
2	(France) Françoise Dürr (United Kingdom) Ann Jones	6	7
3	(Brazil) Maria Bueno (United States) Nancy Richey	2	5
4	(South Africa) Annette du Plooy (South Africa) Pat Walkden	3	2
1	(United States) Rosie Casals (United States) Billie Jean King	6	6

Final
2	(France) Françoise Dürr (United Kingdom) Ann Jones	7	4	6
1	(United States) Rosie Casals (United States) Billie Jean King	5	6	4

=== Top half ===
First round
2	(France) Françoise Dürr (United Kingdom) Ann Jones	6	6
(Greece) C-A Kalogeropoulos (Sweden) Ulla Sandulf	0	1
(Chile) Michelle Rodríguez (Ecuador) Margarita Zuleta	2	2
(France) Christiane Spinoza (France) Évelyne Terras	6	6
7	(Czechoslovakia) Jitka Volavková (Czech Republic) Vlasta Vopičková	6	6
(Brazil) M-C Borba-Dias (Brazil) Suzana Petersen	1	3
(Australia) Carol Sherriff (Australia) Gail Sherriff	6	6
(Belgium) Ingrid Loeys (Sweden) Eva Lundqvist	3	1
3	(Brazil) Maria Bueno (United States) Nancy Richey	6	6
(France) Marion Cristiani (France) A-M Rouchon	4	2
(Australia) Helen Gourlay (South Africa) Laura Rossouw	8	6
(France) F De La Courtie-Billat (France) Monique Salfati	6	2
6	(Soviet Union) Galina Baksheeva (Soviet Union) Anna Dmitrieva	6	7	6
(France) Danièle Bouteleux (France) Suzanne Le Besnerais	1	9	1
(South Africa) Esmé Emmanuel (South Africa) Maryna Proctor	6	6
(Colombia) Paola Palacios (Hungary) Éva Szabó	2	4

Second round
2	(France) Françoise Dürr (United Kingdom) Ann Jones	6	6
(France) Christiane Spinoza (France) Évelyne Terras	0	0
7	(Czechoslovakia) Jitka Volavková (Czech Republic) Vlasta Vopičková	9	1	4
(Australia) Carol Sherriff (Australia) Gail Sherriff	7	6	6
3	(Brazil) Maria Bueno (United States) Nancy Richey	7	6
(Australia) Helen Gourlay (South Africa) Laura Rossouw	5	1
6	(Soviet Union) Galina Baksheeva (Soviet Union) Anna Dmitrieva	4	10	8
(South Africa) Esmé Emmanuel (South Africa) Maryna Proctor	6	8	6

Quarterfinals
2	(France) Françoise Dürr (United Kingdom) Ann Jones	7	6
(Australia) Carol Sherriff (Australia) Gail Sherriff	5	4
3	(Brazil) Maria Bueno (United States) Nancy Richey	6	10	6
6	(Soviet Union) Galina Baksheeva (Soviet Union) Anna Dmitrieva	2	12	3

Semifinals
2	(France) Françoise Dürr (United Kingdom) Ann Jones	6	7
3	(Brazil) Maria Bueno (United States) Nancy Richey	2	5

=== Bottom half ===
First round
(France) Rosie Darmon (France) Janine Lieffrig	6	6
(Sweden) Ingrid Löfdahl (Sweden) Christina Sandberg	2	4
5	(Australia) Karen Krantzcke (Australia) Kerry Melville	6	6
(Finland) Birgitta Lindström (Finland) Christina Lindström	2	0
(Mexico) Patricia Montaño (Mexico) Elena Subirats	3	6	6
(France) Maylis Burel (France) Irene Fraisse	6	0	0
4	(South Africa) Annette du Plooy (South Africa) Patricia Walkden	6	6
(Peru) Virginia Cáceres (Argentina) Raquel Giscafré	2	4
(United States) Julie Heldman (Australia) Fay Moore	6	8
(Egypt) Beatrice Abbas (France) Maud Galtier	3	6
8	(West Germany) Edda Buding (West Germany) Ilse Buding	6	6
(Australia) Kerry Harris (Australia) Lesley Hunt	2	4
(France) Odile de Roubin (France) Nicole Niox-Château	W	O
(West Germany) Kora Schediwy (Switzerland) Anne-Marie Studer
1	(United States) Rosie Casals (United States) Billie Jean King	6	3	6
(Italy) Francesca Gordigiani (Soviet Union) Olga Morozova	4	6	3

Second round
(France) Rosie Darmon (France) Janine Lieffrig	8	6
5	(Australia) Karen Krantzcke (Australia) Kerry Melville	6	3
(Mexico) Patricia Montaño (Mexico) Elena Subirats	0	3
4	(South Africa) Annette du Plooy (South Africa) Patricia Walkden	6	6
(United States) Julie Heldman (Australia) Fay Moore	6	6
8	(West Germany) Edda Buding (West Germany) Ilse Buding	1	3
(France) Odile de Roubin (France) Nicole Niox-Château
1	(United States) Rosie Casals (United States) Billie Jean King	W	O

Quarterfinals
(France) Rosie Darmon (France) Janine Lieffrig	4	7	2
4	(South Africa) Annette du Plooy (South Africa) Patricia Walkden	6	5	6
(United States) Julie Heldman (Australia) Fay Moore
1	(United States) Rosie Casals (United States) Billie Jean King	W	O

Semifinals
4	(South Africa) Annette du Plooy (South Africa) Patricia Walkden	3	2
1	(United States) Rosie Casals (United States) Billie Jean King	6	6
