= 1968 French Open – Women's singles =

Women's singles
- 1968 French Open

Final
- Champion: (United States) Nancy Richey
- Runner-up: (United Kingdom) Ann Jones
- Score: 5–7, 6–4, 6–1

Details
- Draw: 96
- Seeds: 16

Events
Singles	men	women		boys	girls
Doubles	men	women	mixed	boys	girls
← 1967 ·	French Open	· 1969 →

Nancy Richey defeated Ann Jones in the final, 5–7, 6–4, 6–1 to win the women's singles tennis title at the 1968 French Open. It was her first French title and second (and last) major title overall, after the 1967 Australian Championships. This was the first Grand Slam tournament to be open to professional players, marking a period in tennis history known as the Open Era.

Françoise Dürr was the defending champion, but was defeated in the fourth round by Gail Sherriff.

== Seeds ==
1. (United States) Billie Jean King (semifinals)
2. (United Kingdom) Ann Jones (final)
3. (France) Françoise Dürr (fourth round)
4. (United States) Rosie Casals (fourth round)
5. (United States) Nancy Richey (champion)
6. (Australia) Kerry Melville (fourth round)
7. (Czechoslovakia) Vlasta Vopičková (quarterfinals)
8. (Brazil) Maria Bueno (quarterfinals)
9. (South Africa) Patricia Walkden (fourth round)
10. (Italy) Lea Pericoli (withdrew)
11. (South Africa) Annette du Plooy (semifinals)
12. (Soviet Union) Galina Baksheeva (fourth round)
13. (Mexico) Elena Subirats (quarterfinals)
14. (Australia) Gail Sherriff (quarterfinals)
15. (West Germany) Edda Buding (fourth round)
16. (France) Monique Salfati (second round)

Click on the seed number of a player to go to their draw section.

== Draw ==
=== Key ===
- Q = Qualifier
- WC = Wild card
- LL = Lucky loser
- Alt = Alternate
- ITF = ITF entry
- PR = Protected ranking
- SR = Special ranking
- SE = Special exempt
- JE = Junior exempt
- JR = Junior Accelerator Programme entrant
- CO = College Accelerator Programme entrant
- NG = Next Gen Accelerator Program entrant
- w/o = Walkover
- r = Retired
- d = Defaulted

=== Finals ===
Quarterfinals
2	(United Kingdom) Ann Jones	6	6
7	(Czechoslovakia) Vlasta Vopičková	2	1
14	(Australia) Gail Sherriff	6	3
11	(South Africa) Annette du Plooy	8	6
5	(United States) Nancy Richey	6	6
13	(Mexico) Elena Subirats	1	0
8	(Brazil) Maria Bueno	4	4
1	(United States) Billie Jean King	6	6

Semifinals
2	(United Kingdom) Ann Jones	7	6
11	(South Africa) Annette du Plooy	5	3
5	(United States) Nancy Richey	2	6	6
1	(United States) Billie Jean King	6	3	4

Final
2	(United Kingdom) Ann Jones	7	4	1
5	(United States) Nancy Richey	5	6	6

=== Top half ===
==== Section 1 ====
First round

Second round
2	(United Kingdom) A Jones	6	6
(France) I Fraisse	1	1
(South Africa) M Godwin
(Socialist Federal Republic of Yugoslavia) I Škulj	w/o
15	(West Germany) E Buding	6	6
(South Africa) E Emmanuel	2	2
(Czechoslovakia) J Volavková	7	3	3
(Australia) F Moore	5	6	6

Third round
2	(United Kingdom) A Jones	6	6
(South Africa) M Godwin	2	0
15	(West Germany) E Buding	4	6	7
(Australia) F Moore	6	1	5

Fourth round
2	(United Kingdom) A Jones	6	6
15	(West Germany) E Buding	2	4

==== Section 2 ====
First round

Second round
7	(Czechoslovakia) V Vopičková
(France) C Rouire	w/o
(Uruguay) F Bonicelli	w/o
(Greece) C-A Kalogeropoulos
10	(Italy) L Pericoli	w/o
(Colombia) P Palacios
(France) R Darmon	6	6
(Finland) C Lindström	1	0

Third round
7	(Czechoslovakia) V Vopičková	6	6
(Greece) C-A Kalogeropoulos	1	0
(Colombia) P Palacios	2	2
(France) R Darmon	6	6

Fourth round
7	(Czechoslovakia) V Vopičková	7	6	6
(France) R Darmon	9	2	1

==== Section 3 ====
First round
3	(France) F Dürr
(Argentina) M Vrancovich	w/o
(Switzerland) M Kindler	w/o
(Australia) C Sherriff
(Mexico) P Montaño	2	0
(United States) J Heldman	6	6
(United Kingdom) S Holdsworth	w/o
(Switzerland) A-M Studer
14	(Australia) G Sherriff	6	6
(Bulgaria) L Radkova	3	1
(France) C Spinoza
(United Kingdom) F MacLennan	w/o
(West Germany) C Schediwy	6	6
(France) M Cristiani	2	2
(Argentina) R Giscafré	2	1
(Soviet Union) A Dmitrieva	6	6

Second round
3	(France) F Dürr	6	6
(Australia) C Sherriff	1	1
(United States) J Heldman	6	6
(Switzerland) A-M Studer	2	3
14	(Australia) G Sherriff	6	6
(France) C Spinoza	1	0
(West Germany) C Schediwy	6	2	6
(Soviet Union) A Dmitrieva	2	6	8

Third round
3	(France) F Dürr	6	7
(United States) J Heldman	1	5
14	(Australia) G Sherriff	6	6
(Soviet Union) A Dmitrieva	3	0

Fourth round
3	(France) F Dürr	3	3
14	(Australia) G Sherriff	6	6

==== Section 4 ====
First round
6	(Australia) K Melville	6	6
(France) A Nenot	1	1
(Japan) K Sawamatsu	w/o
(Finland) B Lindström
(Sweden) U Sandulf	1	2
(South Africa) L Rossouw	6	6
(France) J Venturino	4	2
(Australia) H Gourlay	6	6
11	(South Africa) A du Plooy
(Japan) J Sawamatsu	w/o
(Australia) H Young	0	1
(France) O de Roubin	6	6
(Sweden) I Löfdahl
(South Africa) G Dove	w/o
(Italy) R Beltrame
(Australia) A Phillips-Moore	w/o

Second round
6	(Australia) K Melville	6	6
(Finland) B Lindström	0	4
(South Africa) L Rossouw	3	2
(Australia) H Gourlay	6	6
11	(South Africa) A du Plooy	6	6
(France) O de Roubin	3	1
(Sweden) I Löfdahl
(Italy) R Beltrame	w/o

Third round
6	(Australia) K Melville	7	6
(Australia) H Gourlay	5	4
11	(South Africa) A du Plooy	7	6
(Sweden) I Löfdahl	5	1

Fourth round
6	(Australia) K Melville	7	4	6
11	(South Africa) A du Plooy	5	6	8

=== Bottom half ===
==== Section 5 ====
First round
(United Kingdom) J Congdon
(Canada) F Urban	w/o
(France) N Niox-Château
(Soviet Union) E Isopaitis	w/o
(Italy) M Giorgi	w/o
(West Germany) I Buding
(Sweden) E Lundquist	5	6	6
12	(Soviet Union) G Baksheeva	7	3	8
(Australia) K Krantzcke	6	6
(France) M Burel	1	2
(Soviet Union) O Morozova
(South Africa) M Delport	w/o
(France) S le Besnerais	1	2
(Sweden) C Sandberg	6	6
(Brazil) M-C Borba-Dias	0	2
5	(United States) N Richey	6	6

Second round
(United Kingdom) J Congdon	w/o
(France) N Niox-Château
(West Germany) I Buding	2	2
12	(Soviet Union) G Baksheeva	6	6
(Australia) K Krantzcke	6	4	6
(Soviet Union) O Morozova	3	6	4
(Sweden) C Sandberg	2	1
5	(United States) N Richey	6	6

Third round
(France) N Niox-Château	3	1
12	(Soviet Union) G Baksheeva	6	6
(Australia) K Krantzcke	4	7	6
5	(United States) N Richey	6	5	8

Fourth round
12	(Soviet Union) G Baksheeva	8	6	1
5	(United States) N Richey	10	4	6

==== Section 6 ====
First round
(France) C Langanay
(Romania) J Dibar	w/o
(Australia) K Harris
(Spain) C Mandarino	w/o
(France) D Bouteleux
(Hungary) J Szörényi	w/o
(Brazil) S Petersen	2	4
13	(Mexico) E Subirats	6	6
(South Africa) J Lieffrig	13	6
(Bulgaria) M Chakarova	11	8
(Socialist Federal Republic of Yugoslavia) A Pipan	w/o
(France) J Mauroy-Toffier
(Belgium) I Loeys	6	6
(Hungary) É Szabó	2	4
(Spain) MJ Aubet
4	(United States) R Casals	w/o

Second round
(France) C Langanay	w/o
(Australia) K Harris
(France) D Bouteleux	2	3
13	(Mexico) E Subirats	6	6
(Bulgaria) M Chakarova	w/o
(France) J Mauroy-Toffier
(Belgium) I Loeys	1	3
4	(United States) R Casals	6	6

Third round
(Australia) K Harris	1	1
13	(Mexico) E Subirats	6	6
(France) J Mauroy-Toffier	w/o
4	(United States) R Casals

Fourth round
13	(Mexico) E Subirats	6	6
4	(United States) R Casals	4	3

==== Section 7 ====
First round

Second round
(France) É Terras	5	4
(Peru) V Cáceres	7	6
(Hungary) M Peterdy-Wolf	w/o
9	(South Africa) P Walkden
(Australia) H Amos	w/o
(Chile) M Rodríguez
(Greece) D Asteri	w/o
8	(Brazil) M Bueno

Third round
(Peru) V Cáceres	5	2
9	(South Africa) P Walkden	7	6
(Chile) M Rodríguez	2	0
8	(Brazil) M Bueno	6	6

Fourth round
9	(South Africa) P Walkden	6	3	3
8	(Brazil) M Bueno	2	6	6

==== Section 8 ====
First round

Second round
(Italy) F Gordigiani
(Australia) S Hole	w/o
(Australia) L Hunt	5	6	6
16	(France) M Salfati	7	2	3
(Ecuador) M Zuleta
(Bulgaria) Y Berberian	w/o
(France) A-M Rouchon	2	2
1	(United States) BJ King	6	6

Third round
(Italy) F Gordigiani	1	5
(Australia) L Hunt	6	7
(Ecuador) M Zuleta	1	0
1	(United States) BJ King	6	6

Fourth round
(Australia) L Hunt	5	1
1	(United States) BJ King	7	6

Preceded by 1968 Australian Championships – Women's singles	Grand Slam women's singles	Succeeded by 1968 Wimbledon Championships – Women's singles
