= 1967 Wimbledon Championships – Women's singles =

Women's singles
- 1967 Wimbledon Championships

Final
- Champion: (United States) Billie Jean King
- Runner-up: (United Kingdom) Ann Jones
- Score: 6–3, 6–4

Details
- Draw: 96 (8 Q )
- Seeds: 8

Events
Singles	men	women		boys	girls
Doubles	men	women	mixed	boys	girls
← 1966 ·	Wimbledon Championships	· 1968 →

Defending champion Billie Jean King defeated Ann Jones in the final, 6–3, 6–4 to win the ladies' singles tennis title at the 1967 Wimbledon Championships. King did not lose a set during the tournament.

== Seeds ==
1. (United States) Billie Jean King (champion)
2. (Brazil) Maria Bueno (fourth round)
3. (United Kingdom) Ann Jones (final)
4. (France) Françoise Dürr (third round)
5. (United States) Nancy Richey (fourth round)
6. (Australia) Lesley Turner (quarterfinals)
7. (South Africa) Annette Van Zyl (fourth round)
8. (United Kingdom) Virginia Wade (quarterfinals)

Click on the seed number of a player to go to their draw section.

== Draw ==
=== Key ===
- Q = Qualifier
- WC = Wild card
- LL = Lucky loser
- Alt = Alternate
- SE = Special exempt
- PR = Protected ranking
- ITF = ITF entry
- JE = Junior exempt
- w/o = Walkover
- r = Retired
- d = Defaulted
- SR = Special ranking

=== Finals ===
Quarterfinals
1	(United States) Billie Jean King	7	6
8	(United Kingdom) Virginia Wade	5	2
(United States) Kathleen Harter	7	1	6
6	(Australia) Lesley Turner	5	6	2
(United States) Mary-Ann Eisel	2	6	5
3	(United Kingdom) Ann Jones	6	4	7
(Australia) Judy Tegart	5	4
(United States) Rosemary Casals	7	6

Semifinals
1	(United States) Billie Jean King	6	6
(United States) Kathleen Harter	0	3
3	(United Kingdom) Ann Jones	2	6	7
(United States) Rosemary Casals	6	3	5

Final
1	(United States) Billie Jean King	6	6
3	(United Kingdom) Ann Jones	3	4

=== Top half ===
==== Section 1 ====
First round

Second round
1	(United States) Billie Jean King	8	6
(Sweden) Ingrid Löfdahl	6	2
(Belgium) Christiane Mercelis
(Netherlands) Elsie Veentjer-Spruyt	w/o
(South Africa) Maryna Godwin	6	6
(Netherlands) Astrid Suurbeek	4	4
(United Kingdom) Frances MacLennan	5	6	1
(Italy) Lea Pericoli	7	4	6

Third round
1	(United States) BJ King
(Netherlands) E Veentjer-Spruyt	w/o
(South Africa) M Godwin	1	2
(Italy) L Pericoli	6	6

Fourth round
1	(United States) BJ King	6	6
(Italy) L Pericoli	1	2

==== Section 2 ====
First round

Second round
8	(United Kingdom) Virginia Wade	6	6
(United Kingdom) Wendy Hall	2	3
(France) Monique Salfati	5	5
(Australia) Kerry Melville	7	7
(South Africa) Greta Delport	6	6
(Canada) Susan Butt	4	1
(Australia) Sue Alexander	3	3
(Czechoslovakia) Jitka Volavková	6	6

Third round
8	(United Kingdom) V Wade	7	6
(Australia) K Melville	5	2
(South Africa) M Delport	5	2
(Czechoslovakia) J Volavková	7	6

Fourth round
8	(United Kingdom) V Wade	6	8
(Czechoslovakia) J Volavková	2	6

==== Section 3 ====
First round
4	(France) Françoise Dürr	6	3	6
(United Kingdom) Christine Truman	3	6	3
(United States) Dorothy Knode	1	0
Q	(Netherlands) Ada Bakker	6	6
(Australia) Jan O'Neill	6	6
(United States) Carol-Ann Kalogeropoulos	0	1
(United States) Carol Aucamp	4	4
(Italy) Roberta Beltrame	6	6
(Finland) Birgitta Lindström	6	5	3
(United Kingdom) Jane Poynder	3	7	6
(West Germany) Edda Buding	6	3	6
(United States) Tory Fretz	3	6	2
Q	(Soviet Union) Rauza Islanova	6	3	4
(United Kingdom) Robin Lloyd	2	6	6
(United States) Kathleen Harter	6	6
(Australia) Gail Sherriff	3	3

Second round
4	(France) F Dürr	6	6
Q	(Netherlands) A Bakker	3	2
(Australia) J O'Neill	6	6
(Italy) R Beltrame	3	3
(United Kingdom) J Poynder	3	3
(West Germany) E Buding	6	6
(United Kingdom) R Lloyd	6	1	4
(United States) K Harter	3	6	6

Third round
4	(France) F Dürr	4	7
(Australia) J O'Neill	6	9
(West Germany) E Buding	2	3
(United States) K Harter	6	6

Fourth round
(Australia) J O'Neill	2	6	3
(United States) K Harter	6	4	6

==== Section 4 ====
First round
6	(Australia) Lesley Turner	7	6
Q	(United States) Betty Pratt	5	2
(United Kingdom) Nell Truman	6	6
(Canada) Faye Urban	1	1
(South Africa) Glenda Swan	1	2
LL	(Spain) María José Aubet	6	6
(United States) Kathy Blake	4	9	6
Q	(Australia) Margaret Harris	6	7	4
(United States) Donna Fales	6	3
(Soviet Union) Galina Baksheeva	8	6
(South Africa) Jean Forbes	7	3	6
(South Africa) Heather Segal	5	6	4
Q	(United States) Alice Tym
(Italy) Silvana Lazzarino	w/o
(Netherlands) Trudy Groenman	6	6
(United States) Patti Hogan	3	2

Second round
6	(Australia) L Turner	6	7
(United Kingdom) E Truman	1	5
LL	(Spain) MJ Aubet	2	1
(United States) K Blake	6	6
(Soviet Union) G Baksheeva	6	6
(South Africa) J Forbes	1	2
Q	(United States) A Tym	2	3
(Netherlands) G Groenman	6	6

Third round
6	(Australia) L Turner	6	6
(United States) K Blake	1	2
(Soviet Union) G Baksheeva	6	6
(Netherlands) G Groenman	3	4

Fourth round
6	(Australia) L Turner	11	5	6
(Soviet Union) G Baksheeva	9	7	1

=== Bottom half ===
==== Section 5 ====
First round
(Australia) Carol Sherriff	6	6
LL	(Australia) Therese Mackay	1	4
(United States) Mary-Ann Eisel	6	6
(United Kingdom) Judy Congdon	1	3
(Spain) Carmen Mandarino	1	5
(Belgium) Ingrid Loeys	6	7
(United States) Ceci Martinez	3	6	8
(United Kingdom) Corinne Molesworth	6	4	6
(Italy) Francesca Gordigiani	6	9
(Canada) Vicki Berner	4	7
(Soviet Union) Anna Dmitrieva	6	6
(United Kingdom) Pauline Roberts	1	1
(United Kingdom) Joyce Williams	6	6
(United Kingdom) Janice Townsend	2	2
(Australia) Helen Gourlay	1	1
5	(United States) Nancy Richey	6	6

Second round
(Australia) C Sherriff	3	3
(United States) M-A Eisel	6	6
(Belgium) I Loeys	1	4
(United States) C Martinez	6	6
(Italy) F Gordigiani	2	2
(Soviet Union) A Dmitrieva	6	6
(United Kingdom) J Williams	0	5
5	(United States) N Richey	6	7

Third round
(United States) M-A Eisel	3	6	6
(United States) C Martinez	6	1	0
(Soviet Union) A Dmitrieva	4	4
5	(United States) N Richey	6	6

Fourth round
(United States) M-A Eisel	9	3	6
5	(United States) N Richey	7	6	4

==== Section 6 ====
First round
(Australia) Fay Toyne	2	4
(Netherlands) Lidy Jansen-Venneboer	6	6
(United States) Stephanie DeFina	6	6
(France) Isabelle de Lansalut	2	3
(United Kingdom) Heather Allen	1	7
(Sweden) Eva Lundqvist	6	9
(United Kingdom) Margaret Lee	4	2
(Australia) Karen Krantzcke	6	6
(South Africa) Esmé Emmanuel	6	6
Q	(West Germany) Kerstin Seelbach	3	1
(France) Johanne Venturino	4	2
(Czechoslovakia) Vlasta Vopičková	6	6
(United States) Carole Graebner	7	6
Q	(United Kingdom) Vicky Coombs	5	4
(United Kingdom) Lorna Greville-Collins	1	2
3	(United Kingdom) Ann Jones	6	6

Second round
(Netherlands) L Jansen-Venneboer	3	10
(United States) S DeFina	6	12
(Sweden) E Lundqvist	1	2
(Australia) K Krantzcke	6	6
(South Africa) E Emmanuel	2	6	6
(Czechoslovakia) V Vopičková	6	1	0
(United States) C Graebner	6	3	4
3	(United Kingdom) A Jones	4	6	6

Third round
(United States) S DeFina	6	8
(Australia) K Krantzcke	0	6
(South Africa) E Emmanuel	3	1
3	(United Kingdom) A Jones	6	6

Fourth round
(United States) S DeFina	1	1
3	(United Kingdom) A Jones	6	6

==== Section 7 ====
First round

Second round
(United Kingdom) Alex Soady	4	3
(Australia) Judy Tegart	6	6
Q	(United States) Mimi Henreid	1	0
(Rhodesia) Pat Walkden	6	6
(Australia) Joan Cottrill	6	6
(Netherlands) Betty Stöve	0	1
(United States) Susan Behlmar	4	4
7	(South Africa) Annette Van Zyl	6	6

Third round
(Australia) J Tegart	8	6
(Rhodesia) P Walkden	6	0
(Australia) J Cottrill	3	6	0
7	(South Africa) A Van Zyl	6	3	6

Fourth round
(Australia) J Tegart	6	3	6
7	(South Africa) A Van Zyl	4	6	1

==== Section 8 ====
First round

Second round
(United Kingdom) Rita Bentley	0	6	3
(United Kingdom) Winnie Shaw	6	4	6
(France) Évelyne Terras	1	3
(United States) Rosie Casals	6	6
(Italy) Monica Giorgi	4	0
(United States) Lynn Abbes	6	6
(South Africa) Laura Rossouw	3	1
2	(Brazil) Maria Bueno	6	6

Third round
(United Kingdom) W Shaw	1	6
(United States) R Casals	6	8
(United States) L Abbes	4	0
2	(Brazil) M Bueno	6	6

Fourth round
(United States) R Casals	2	6	6
2	(Brazil) M Bueno	6	2	3

Preceded by 1967 French Championships – Women's singles	Grand Slam women's singles	Succeeded by 1967 U.S. National Championships – Women's singles
