= 1968 Wimbledon Championships – Women's singles =

Women's singles
- 1968 Wimbledon Championships

Final
- Champion: (United States) Billie Jean King
- Runner-up: (Australia) Judy Tegart
- Score: 9–7, 7–5

Details
- Draw: 96 (8Q)
- Seeds: 8

Events
| Singles | men | women | | boys | girls |
| Doubles | men | women | mixed | boys | girls |
- Wimbledon Championships

Two-time defending champion Billie Jean King defeated Judy Tegart in the final, 9–7, 7–5 to win the ladies' singles tennis title at the 1968 Wimbledon Championships. It was her third Wimbledon singles title and fifth major singles title overall. It was the first edition of Wimbledon open to professional players, marking a period in tennis history known as the Open Era.

== Seeds ==
1. (United States) Billie Jean King (champion)
2. (Australia) Margaret Court (quarterfinals)
3. (United States) Nancy Richey (semifinals)
4. (United Kingdom) Ann Jones (semifinals)
5. (United Kingdom) Virginia Wade (first round)
6. (Brazil) Maria Bueno (quarterfinals)
7. (Australia) Judy Tegart (final)
8. (Australia) Lesley Bowrey (quarterfinals)

Click on the seed number of a player to go to their draw section.

== Draw ==
Key

- Q = Qualifier
- WC = Wild card
- LL = Lucky loser
- Alt = Alternate
- ITF = ITF entry
- PR = Protected ranking
- SR = Special ranking
- SE = Special exempt
- JE = Junior exempt
- JR = Junior Accelerator Programme entrant
- CO = College Accelerator Programme entrant
- NG = Next Gen Accelerator Program entrant
- w/o = Walkover
- r = Retired
- d = Defaulted

=== Finals ===
Quarterfinals
1 | (United States) Billie Jean King | 6 | 6
8 | (Australia) Lesley Bowrey | 3 | 4
4 | (United Kingdom) Ann Jones | 6 | 6
(France) Françoise Dürr | 2 | 2
6 | (Brazil) Maria Bueno | 4 | 2
3 | (United States) Nancy Richey | 6 | 6
7 | (Australia) Judy Tegart | 4 | 8 | 6
2 | (Australia) Margaret Court | 6 | 6 | 1

Semifinals
1 | (United States) Billie Jean King | 4 | 7 | 6
4 | (United Kingdom) Ann Jones | 6 | 5 | 2
3 | (United States) Nancy Richey | 3 | 1
7 | (Australia) Judy Tegart | 6 | 6

Final
1 | (United States) Billie Jean King | 9 | 7
7 | (Australia) Judy Tegart | 7 | 5

=== Top half ===
==== Section 1 ====
First round

Second round
1 | (United States) BJ King | 7 | 6
(United States) J Bartkowicz | 5 | 4
(South Africa) L Rossouw | 3 | 4
(United States) S DeFina | 6 | 6
(Australia) F Moore | 2 | 6 | 6
(Australia) L Hunt | 6 | 2 | 3
(United Kingdom) C Janes | 4 | 2
(Netherlands) M Jansen | 6 | 6

Third round
1 | (United States) BJ King | 6 | 7
(United States) S DeFina | 2 | 5
(Australia) F Moore | 2 | 6 | 6
(Netherlands) M Jansen | 6 | 4 | 1

Fourth round
1 | (United States) BJ King | 6 | 6
(Australia) F Moore | 2 | 4

==== Section 2 ====
First round

Second round
8 | (Australia) L Bowrey | 6 | 6
(Sweden) E Lundquist | 2 | 1
(Italy) F Gordigiani | 1 | 3
(West Germany) H Schultze | 6 | 6
(United Kingdom) J Williams | 6 | 7
(Czechoslovakia) V Vopičková | 2 | 5
(France) J Lieffrig | 10 | 6
(United Kingdom) A Soady | 8 | 3

Third round
8 | (Australia) L Bowrey | 6 | 6
(West Germany) H Schultze | 4 | 2
(United Kingdom) J Williams | 7 | 4 | 6
(France) J Lieffrig | 5 | 6 | 4

Fourth round
8 | (Australia) L Bowrey | 6 | 6
(United Kingdom) J Williams | 3 | 1

==== Section 3 ====
First round
4 | (United Kingdom) A Jones | 6 | 4 | 6
(United States) K Harter | 0 | 6 | 4
(Italy) L Bassi | 3 | 4
Q | (Australia) J Hoad | 6 | 6
(Italy) M Giorgi | 3 | 2
(South Africa) E Emmanuel | 6 | 6
(South Africa) P Walkden | 3 | 6 | 8
(France) R Darmon | 6 | 0 | 6
(South Africa) H Segal | 2 | 5
(West Germany) H Niessen | 6 | 7
(Australia) H Gourlay | 6 | 6
(Soviet Union) O Morozova | 4 | 4
(United States) C Martinez | 6 | 6 | 6
(Mexico) E Subirats | 8 | 3 | 4
(United Kingdom) J Congdon | 6 | 4 | 6
(France) C Spinoza | 2 | 6 | 4

Second round
4 | (United Kingdom) A Jones | 6 | 6
Q | (Australia) J Hoad | 0 | 1
(South Africa) E Emmanuel | 2 | 3
(South Africa) P Walkden | 6 | 6
(West Germany) H Niessen | 6 | 6 | 6
(Australia) H Gourlay | 3 | 8 | 8
(United States) C Martinez | 6 | 7
(United Kingdom) J Congdon | 1 | 5

Third round
4 | (United Kingdom) A Jones | 6 | 7
(South Africa) P Walkden | 2 | 5
(Australia) H Gourlay | 6 | 6
(United States) C Martinez | 4 | 0

Fourth round
4 | (United Kingdom) A Jones | 6 | 6
(Australia) H Gourlay | 3 | 1

==== Section 4 ====
First round
5 | (United Kingdom) V Wade | 4 | 3
(Sweden) C Sandberg | 6 | 6
(United Kingdom) R Bentley | 5 | 4
Q | (United States) M Aschner | 7 | 6
(United States) M Wheeler | 3 | 3
(United Kingdom) C Molesworth | 6 | 6
(United States) P Hogan | 6 | 6
(South Africa) J Drysdale | 1 | 2
(France) F Dürr | 6 | 6
(Belgium) C Mercelis | 4 | 2
(United Kingdom) J Townsend | 6 | 6
(United States) A Tym | 2 | 4
(United States) P Lamm | 6 | 9
(Netherlands) L Jansen-Venneboer | 3 | 7
Q | (Japan) K Sawamatsu | 2 | 2
(Australia) K Melville | 6 | 6

Second round
(Sweden) C Sandberg | 6 | 7
Q | (United States) M Aschner | 2 | 5
(United Kingdom) C Molesworth | 6 | 3 | 3
(United States) P Hogan | 3 | 6 | 6
(France) F Dürr | 6 | 6
(United Kingdom) J Townsend | 0 | 4
(United States) P Lamm | 4 | 4
(Australia) K Melville | 6 | 6

Third round
(Sweden) C Sandberg | 4 | 4
(United States) P Hogan | 6 | 6
(France) F Dürr | 6 | 8
(Australia) K Melville | 3 | 6

Fourth round
(United States) P Hogan | 2 | 2
(France) F Dürr | 6 | 6

=== Bottom half ===
==== Section 5 ====
First round
Q | (West Germany) C Schediwy | 1 | 8
(Australia) K Krantzcke | 6 | 10
(United States) R Casals | 6 | 7
(United States) V Ziegenfuss | 3 | 5
(Australia) G Sherriff | 4 | 4
(United Kingdom) F MacLennan | 6 | 6
(Sweden) I Löfdahl | 9 | 2
(Soviet Union) G Baksheeva | 11 | 6
(United Kingdom) M Lee | 7 | 0 | 5
(Canada) F Urban | 5 | 6 | 7
(United States) J Heldman | 6 | 6
(Spain) C Mandarino | 1 | 4
(United States) E Pratt | 6 | 4
(Australia) C Sherriff | 8 | 6
(Italy) L Pericoli | w/o
6 | (Brazil) M Bueno

Second round
(Australia) K Krantzcke | 7 | 3
(United States) R Casals | 9 | 6
(United Kingdom) F MacLennan | 5 | 1
(Soviet Union) G Baksheeva | 7 | 6
(Canada) F Urban | 7 | 5 | 2
(United States) J Heldman | 5 | 7 | 6
(Australia) C Sherriff | 4 | 1
6 | (Brazil) M Bueno | 6 | 6

Third round
(United States) R Casals | 8 | 3 | 7
(Soviet Union) G Baksheeva | 6 | 6 | 5
(United States) J Heldman | 4 | 1
6 | (Brazil) M Bueno | 6 | 6

Fourth round
(United States) R Casals | 7 | 4 | 3
6 | (Brazil) M Bueno | 5 | 6 | 6

==== Section 6 ====
First round
Q | (United States) N Netter | 6 | 6
(Belgium) I Loeys | 2 | 3
(West Germany) H Orth | 1 | 8 | 6
(France) F de la Courtie-Billat | 6 | 6 | 1
(United Kingdom) P Roberts | 5 | 2
(South Africa) B Vukovich | 7 | 6
(France) M Salfati | 4 | 6 | 5
(United States) K Pigeon | 6 | 3 | 7
(United Kingdom) Greville-Collins | 3 | 5
(Netherlands) A Suurbeek | 6 | 7
(United Kingdom) E Truman | 4 | 6 | 3
(United Kingdom) W Shaw | 6 | 4 | 6
LL | (United Kingdom) W Hall | 6 | 4 | 3
Q | (Australia) H Amos | 3 | 6 | 6
(South Africa) M Godwin | 1 | 3
3 | (United States) N Richey | 6 | 6

Second round
(United States) N Netter | 2 | 6
(West Germany) H Orth | 6 | 8
(South Africa) B Vukovich | 1 | 3
(United States) K Pigeon | 6 | 6
(Netherlands) A Suurbeek | 0 | 6 | 2
(United Kingdom) W Shaw | 6 | 4 | 6
Q | (Australia) H Amos | 1 | 3
3 | (United States) Richey | 6 | 6

Third round
(West Germany) H Orth | 2 | 0
(United States) K Pigeon | 6 | 6
(United Kingdom) W Shaw | 1 | 2
3 | (United States) N Richey | 6 | 6

Fourth round
(United States) K Pigeon | 5 | 5
3 | (United States) N Richey | 7 | 7

==== Section 7 ====
First round

Second round
(United Kingdom) S Brasher | 4 | 6 | 6
Q | (Argentina) R Giscafré | 6 | 4 | 4
(United Kingdom) R Lloyd | 1 | 3
(United States) V Rogers | 6 | 6
(United States) M-A Eisel | 6 | 6
(Italy) MT Riedl | 1 | 4
(Czechoslovakia) J Volavková | 0 | 1
7 | (Australia) J Tegart | 6 | 6

Third round
(United Kingdom) S Brasher | 6 | 9
(United States) V Rogers | 2 | 7
(United States) M-A Eisel | 2 | 6
7 | (Australia) J Tegart | 6 | 8

Fourth round
(United Kingdom) S Brasher | 2 | 2
7 | (Australia) J Tegart | 6 | 6

==== Section 8 ====
First round

Second round
(West Germany) K Seelbach | 6 | 6
Q | (Australia) M Harris | 3 | 2
(Australia) K Harris | 1 | 1
(West Germany) E Buding | 6 | 6
(Netherlands) A Bakker | 4 | 6 | 6
(France) É Terras | 6 | 3 | 1
(South Africa) A du Plooy | 1 | 0
2 | (Australia) M Court | 6 | 6

Third round
(West Germany) K Seelbach | 1 | 1
(West Germany) E Buding | 6 | 6
(Netherlands) A Bakker | 0 | 2
2 | (Australia) M Court | 6 | 6

Fourth round
(West Germany) E Buding | 2 | 3
2 | (Australia) M Court | 6 | 6

| Preceded by 1968 French Open – Women's singles | Grand Slam women's singles | Succeeded by 1968 US Open – Women's singles |
