= 1967 Wimbledon Championships – Mixed doubles =

Mixed doubles
- 1967 Wimbledon Championships

Final
- Champions: (Australia) Owen Davidson (United States) Billie Jean King
- Runners-up: (Australia) Ken Fletcher (Brazil) Maria Bueno
- Score: 7–5, 6–2

Details
- Draw: 80 (4Q)
- Seeds: 4

Events
Singles	men	women		boys	girls
Doubles	men	women	mixed	boys	girls
- Wimbledon Championships

Ken Fletcher and Margaret Smith were the defending champions, but Smith did not compete.

Owen Davidson and Billie Jean King defeated Fletcher and Maria Bueno in the final, 7–5, 6–2 to win the mixed doubles tennis title at the 1967 Wimbledon Championships.

== Seeds ==
1. (Australia) Owen Davidson / (United States) Billie Jean King (champions)
2. (Australia) Ken Fletcher / (Brazil) Maria Bueno (final)
3. (Australia) Tony Roche / (Australia) Judy Tegart (fourth round)
4. (South Africa) Frew McMillan / (South Africa) Annette Van Zyl (semifinals)

Click on the seed number of a player to go to their draw section.

== Draw ==
Key

- Q = Qualifier
- WC = Wild card
- LL = Lucky loser
- Alt = Alternate
- ITF = ITF entry
- PR = Protected ranking
- SR = Special ranking
- SE = Special exempt
- JE = Junior exempt
- JR = Junior Accelerator Programme entrant
- CO = College Accelerator Programme entrant
- NG = Next Gen Accelerator Program entrant
- w/o = Walkover
- r = Retired
- d = Defaulted

=== Finals ===
Quarterfinals
1	(Australia) Owen Davidson (United States) Billie Jean King	6	6
(Australia) John Cottrill (Australia) Joan Cottrill	4	1
4	(South Africa) Frew McMillan (South Africa) Annette Van Zyl	6	6
(South Africa) Bob Maud (United Kingdom) Virginia Wade	3	2
(Australia) Ray Ruffels (Australia) Karen Krantzcke	7	6	6
(United States) Bob Lutz (United States) Rosie Casals	9	4	4
(Soviet Union) Alex Metreveli (Soviet Union) Anna Dmitrieva	8	5	14
2	(Australia) Ken Fletcher (Brazil) Maria Bueno	6	7	16

Semifinals
1	(Australia) Owen Davidson (United States) Billie Jean King	6	3	6
4	(South Africa) Frew McMillan (South Africa) Annette Van Zyl	3	6	1
(Australia) Ray Ruffels (Australia) Karen Krantzcke	3	1
2	(Australia) Ken Fletcher (Brazil) Maria Bueno	6	6

Final
1	(Australia) Owen Davidson (United States) Billie Jean King	7	6
2	(Australia) Ken Fletcher (Brazil) Maria Bueno	5	2

=== Top half ===
==== Section 1 ====
First round

Second round
1	(Australia) Owen Davidson (United States) Billie Jean King
(Chile) Jaime Pinto Bravo (Netherlands) Elsie Veentjer-Spruyt	w/o
(New Zealand) John McDonald (United Kingdom) Rita Bentley	4	2
(Australia) Bob Howe (Netherlands) Betty Stöve	6	6
(India) Naresh Kumar (West Germany) Edda Buding	6	4	6
(United States) Gardnar Mulloy (United States) Stephanie DeFina	3	6	3
(United Kingdom) Tony Pickard (United States) Betty Pratt	2	4
(Chile) Patricio Cornejo (Sweden) Ingrid Löfdahl	6	6

Third round
1	(Australia) O Davidson (United States) BJ King	6	6
(Australia) R Howe (Netherlands) B Stöve	1	1
(India) N Kumar (West Germany) E Buding	6	3	2
(Chile) P Cornejo (Sweden) I Löfdahl	3	6	6

Fourth round
1	(Australia) O Davidson (United States) BJ King	6	6
(Chile) P Cornejo (Sweden) I Löfdahl	4	0

==== Section 2 ====
First round

Second round
(Australia) Bill Bowrey (Australia) Lesley Turner	6	7	11
(Australia) Brian Tobin (Australia) Kerry Melville	4	9	13
(Australia) Ray Keldie (United States) Kathleen Harter	6	6
(Australia) Ray Wilson (Australia) Margaret Harris	3	4
(Australia) John Cottrill (Australia) Joan Cottrill
(Socialist Federal Republic of Yugoslavia) Boro Jovanović (United Kingdom) Ann Jones	w/o
(Belgium) Claude De Gronckel (Belgium) Ingrid Loeys	3	4
(United Kingdom) Michael Hann (United Kingdom) Robin Lloyd	6	6

Third round
(Australia) B Tobin (Australia) K Melville	8	5	9
(Australia) R Keldie (United States) K Harter	6	7	7
(Australia) J Cottrill (Australia) J Cottrill	6	4	6
(United Kingdom) M Hann (United Kingdom) R Lloyd	3	6	3

Fourth round
(Australia) B Tobin (Australia) K Melville	6	3	1
(Australia) J Cottrill (Australia) J Cottrill	4	6	6

==== Section 3 ====
First round

Second round
4	(South Africa) Frew McMillan (South Africa) Annette Van Zyl	6	6
(Australia) John Newcombe (Australia) Angie Newcombe	2	1
(South Africa) Rohan Summers (South Africa) Glenda Swan	3	5
(Canada) Robert Puddicombe (Canada) Faye Urban	6	7
(Ecuador) Pancho Guzmán (Australia) Helen Gourlay	6	5	4
(United Kingdom) Mark Cox (United Kingdom) Alison Cox	2	7	6
(South Africa) Graydon Garner (South Africa) Maryna Godwin
(United States) Cliff Richey (United States) Nancy Richey	w/o

Third round
4	(South Africa) F McMillan (South Africa) A Van Zyl	6	6
(Canada) R Puddicombe (Canada) F Urban	4	4
(United Kingdom) M Cox (United Kingdom) A Cox	13	6	1
(South Africa) G Garner (South Africa) M Godwin	15	2	6

Fourth round
4	(South Africa) F McMillan (South Africa) A Van Zyl	8	4	6
(South Africa) G Garner (South Africa) M Godwin	6	6	4

==== Section 4 ====
First round
(United States) Donald Dell (South Africa) Heather Segal	2	2
(United States) Bill Hoogs (United Kingdom) Joyce Williams	6	6
(Australia) Ronald McKenzie (United Kingdom) Pauline Roberts	7	9	4
(United Kingdom) Roger Taylor (United Kingdom) Frances MacLennan	5	11	6
(South Africa) Bob Maud (United Kingdom) Virginia Wade	6	6
(Netherlands) Tom Okker (Netherlands) Trudy Groenman	4	4
(Spain) José Luis Arilla (Spain) María José Aubet	2	3
(Australia) Graham Primrose (United Kingdom) Alex Soady	6	6
(Denmark) Jan Leschly (Sweden) Eva Lundqvist	6	6
(Australia) Colin Stubs (Australia) Carol Sherriff	4	4
(Soviet Union) Toomas Leius (Soviet Union) Galina Baksheeva	3	6	6
Q	(Netherlands) Nick Fleury (Netherlands) Ada Bakker	6	4	4
(United Kingdom) Gerald Battrick (United Kingdom) Winnie Shaw	1	7	5
(United Kingdom) Humphrey Truman (United Kingdom) Christine Truman	6	5	7
(Japan) Ichizo Konishi (France) Isabelle de Lansalut	2	6	2
Q	(United States) Brian Cheney (United States) Mimi Henreid	6	4	6

Second round
(United States) W Hoogs (United Kingdom) J Williams	4	3
(United Kingdom) R Taylor (United Kingdom) F MacLennan	6	6
(South Africa) R Maud (United Kingdom) V Wade	3	6	6
(Australia) G Primrose (United Kingdom) A Soady	6	0	0
(Denmark) J Leschly (Sweden) E Lundqvist	7	2	3
(Soviet Union) T Leius (Soviet Union) G Baksheeva	5	6	6
(United Kingdom) H Truman (United Kingdom) C Truman	6	6
Q	(United States) B Cheney (United States) M Henreid	2	4

Third round
(United Kingdom) R Taylor (United Kingdom) F MacLennan	3	5
(South Africa) R Maud (United Kingdom) V Wade	6	7
(Soviet Union) T Leius (Soviet Union) G Baksheeva	4	5
(United Kingdom) H Truman (United Kingdom) C Truman	6	7

Fourth round
(South Africa) R Maud (United Kingdom) V Wade	6	6
(United Kingdom) H Truman (United Kingdom) C Truman	4	4

=== Bottom half ===
==== Section 5 ====
First round
(South Africa) Bob Hewitt (South Africa) Dalaille Hewitt	6	3	1
(Australia) James John O'Neill (Australia) Jan O'Neill	4	6	6
(France) Jean-Baptiste Chanfreau (Australia) Gail Sherriff	1	9	4
(Sweden) Lars Ölander (Sweden) EE Andersson	6	7	6
(United States) Bill Tym (United States) Alice Tym	0	1
(Australia) Jimmy Moore (Australia) Fay Toyne	6	6
(United Kingdom) Graham Stilwell (United Kingdom) Nell Truman	6	6
(Chile) Ernesto Aguirre (Spain) Ana María Estalella	4	3
(United States) Tom Leonard (United States) Tory Fretz	6	7
(South Africa) Ray Moore (South Africa) Anita van Deventer	3	5
(South Africa) Jack Saul (South Africa) Esmé Emmanuel	6	6
(United Kingdom) John Barrett (United Kingdom) Angela Barrett	2	4
(Canada) Keith Carpenter (Canada) Vicki Berner	7	1	2
(Australia) Ray Ruffels (Australia) Karen Krantzcke	5	6	6
Q	(United States) John Pickens (United States) Wendy Overton	6	6
(Colombia) William Álvarez (Sweden) Ulla Sandulf	3	2

Second round
(Australia) JJ O'Neill (Australia) J O'Neill	4	4
(Sweden) L Ölander (Sweden) EE Andersson	6	6
(Australia) J Moore (Australia) F Toyne	6	6
(United Kingdom) G Stilwell (United Kingdom) E Truman	3	4
(United States) T Leonard (United States) T Fretz	6	3
(South Africa) J Saul (South Africa) E Emmanuel	8	6
(Australia) R Ruffels (Australia) K Krantzcke	6	4	6
(United States) J Pickens (United States) W Overton	4	6	3

Third round
(Sweden) L Ölander (Sweden) EE Andersson	6	3	4
(Australia) J Moore (Australia) F Toyne	3	6	6
(South Africa) J Saul (South Africa) E Emmanuel	6	2	3
(Australia) R Ruffels (Australia) K Krantzcke	1	6	6

Fourth round
(Australia) J Moore (Australia) F Toyne	1	4
(Australia) R Ruffels (Australia) K Krantzcke	6	6

==== Section 6 ====
First round

Second round
(United States) Bob Lutz (United States) Rosie Casals	6	8
(Brazil) José Edison Mandarino (Spain) Carmen Mandarino	2	6
(United Kingdom) Peter Curtis (United States) Mary-Ann Eisel
(Belgium) Eric Drossart (Belgium) Christiane Mercelis	w/o
(New Zealand) Brian Fairlie (Mexico) Elena Subirats	4	6	5
(Greece) Nicholas Kalogeropoulos (United States) Carol-Ann Kalogeropoulos	6	3	7
(Soviet Union) Vladimir Korotkov (Soviet Union) Rauza Islanova	2	4
3	(Australia) Tony Roche (Australia) Judy Tegart	6	6

Third round
(United States) R Lutz (United States) R Casals	6	6
(United Kingdom) P Curtis (United States) M-A Eisel	4	4
(Greece) N Kalogeropoulos (United States) C-A Kalogeropoulos	1	1
3	(Australia) A Roche (Australia) J Tegart	6	6

Fourth round
(United States) R Lutz (United States) R Casals	6	6
3	(Australia) A Roche (Australia) J Tegart	2	4

==== Section 7 ====
First round

Second round
(Romania) Ilie Năstase (France) Monique Salfati	3	8
(United States) Gene Scott (United States) Carol Aucamp	6	10
(Chile) Patricio Rodríguez (France) Michelle Rodríguez	7	6
(France) Bernard Montrenaud (France) Évelyne Terras	5	4
(Denmark) Jørgen Ulrich (Denmark) Pia Balling	2	2
(Soviet Union) Alex Metreveli (Soviet Union) Anna Dmitrieva	6	6
(Finland) Pekka Säilä (Finland) Birgitta Lindström	5	7
(South Africa) Peter Mors (Rhodesia) Pat Walkden	7	9

Third round
(United States) E Scott (United States) C Aucamp	6	1	6
(Chile) P Rodríguez (France) M Rodríguez	3	6	3
(Soviet Union) A Metreveli (Soviet Union) A Dmitrieva	6	6
(South Africa) P Mors (Rhodesia) P Walkden	4	4

Fourth round
(United States) E Scott (United States) C Aucamp	6	4
(Soviet Union) A Metreveli (Soviet Union) A Dmitrieva	8	6

==== Section 8 ====
First round

Second round
(Italy) Giuseppe Merlo (Sweden) Madelaine Pegel	6	6
Q	(Australia) Ken Hiskins (United Kingdom) Elizabeth Ernest	2	4
(Australia) JC Fletcher (United Kingdom) Valerie Clark	4	3
(India) Ramanathan Krishnan (France) Maylis Burel	6	6
(United States) Marty Riessen (United States) Carole Graebner	4	5
(Socialist Federal Republic of Yugoslavia) Nikola Pilić (France) Françoise Dürr	6	7
(United Kingdom) Colin McHugo (United Kingdom) Wendy Hall	3	0
2	(Australia) Ken Fletcher (Brazil) Maria Bueno	6	6

Third round
(Italy) G Merlo (Sweden) M Pegel	3	2
(India) R Krishnan (France) M Burel	6	6
(Socialist Federal Republic of Yugoslavia) N Pilić (France) F Dürr	7	2
2	(Australia) K Fletcher (Brazil) M Bueno	9	6

Fourth round
(India) R Krishnan (France) M Burel	1	1
2	(Australia) K Fletcher (Brazil) M Bueno	6	6
