= 1967 Wimbledon Championships – Girls' singles =

Girls' singles
- 1967 Wimbledon Championships

Final
- Champion: (Netherlands) Judith Salomé
- Runner-up: (Sweden) Maria Strandberg
- Score: 6–4, 6–2

Details
- Draw: 19

Events
Singles	men	women		boys	girls
Doubles	men	women	mixed	boys	girls
← 1966 ·	Wimbledon Championships	· 1968 →

Judith Salomé defeated Maria Strandberg in the final, 6–4, 6–2 to win the girls' singles tennis title at the 1967 Wimbledon Championships.

== Draw ==
=== Key ===
- Q = Qualifier
- WC = Wild card
- LL = Lucky loser
- Alt = Alternate
- SE = Special exempt
- PR = Protected ranking
- ITF = ITF entry
- JE = Junior exempt
- w/o = Walkover
- r = Retired
- d = Defaulted
- SR = Special ranking

=== Finals ===
Semifinals
(Sweden) Maria Strandberg	6	7
(Brazil) VL Cleto	1	5
(Netherlands) Judith Salomé	3	7	7
(Poland) Danuta Wieczorek	6	5	5

Final
(Sweden) Maria Strandberg	4	2
(Netherlands) Judith Salomé	6	6

=== Top half ===
First round
(South Africa) Gillian Dove	11	7	6
(Norway) H Hancke	9	9	2
(Indonesia) Lany Kaligis	6	6	3
(Brazil) Vera Lúcia Cleto	8	4	6

Second round
(Mexico) P Montaño	6	6
(Socialist Federal Republic of Yugoslavia) Alenka Pipan	1	2
(Sweden) Maria Strandberg	6	6
(Switzerland) M Kindler	1	3
(Austria) I Kopvac	6	5	2
(Republic of Ireland) Nora McMordie	4	7	6
(South Africa) G Dove	1	6	7
(Brazil) VL Cleto	6	4	9

Quarterfinals
(Mexico) P Montaño	7	5
(Sweden) M Strandberg	9	7
(Republic of Ireland) N McMordie	2	0
(Brazil) VL Cleto	6	6

Semifinals
(Sweden) M Strandberg	6	7
(Brazil) VL Cleto	1	5

=== Bottom half ===
First round
(Netherlands) Judith Salomé	9	6
(Denmark) Dorte Ekner	7	0

Second round
(Netherlands) J Salomé
(Portugal) Leonora Santos	w/o
(United Kingdom) Dianne Oakley	6	11
(Belgium) D Castelyn	2	9
(Brazil) M Daumerie	3	3
(Greece) Alex Rotas	6	6
(Poland) Danuta Wieczorek	6	6
(Finland) Hilkka Hannula	1	4

Quarterfinals
(Netherlands) J Salomé	6	6	6
(United Kingdom) D Oakley	8	3	3
(Greece) A Rotas	4	1
(Poland) D Wieczorek	6	6

Semifinals
(Netherlands) J Salomé	3	7	7
(Poland) D Wieczorek	6	5	5
