= 1967 Wimbledon Championships =

- Date: 26 June – 8 July
- Edition: 81st
- Category: Grand Slam
- Surface: Grass
- Location: Church Road; SW19, Wimbledon, London, United Kingdom
- Venue: All England Lawn Tennis and Croquet Club
- Attendance: 301,896

Champions

Men's singles
- (Australia) John Newcombe

Women's singles
- (United States) Billie Jean King

Men's doubles
- (South Africa) Bob Hewitt / (South Africa) Frew McMillan

Women's doubles
- (United States) Rosie Casals / (United States) Billie Jean King

Mixed doubles
- (Australia) Owen Davidson / (United States) Billie Jean King

Boys' singles
- (Spain) Manuel Orantes

Girls' singles
- (Netherlands) Judith Salomé
← 1966 ·	Wimbledon Championships	· 1968 →

The 1967 Wimbledon Championships took place on the outdoor grass courts at the All England Lawn Tennis and Croquet Club in Wimbledon, London, United Kingdom. The tournament was held from Monday 26 June until Saturday 8 July 1967. It was the 81st staging of the Wimbledon Championships, and the third Grand Slam tennis event of 1967. John Newcombe and Billie Jean King won the singles titles.

== Launch of colour television ==
The first colour television broadcast in the UK, as well as in Europe, took place on 1 July 1967, the first Saturday of the Championships, when, starting at 2 pm, four hours of live coverage of the Championships was shown on BBC2 presented by David Vine and with commentary from Keith Fordyce. The first match broadcast in colour was Cliff Drysdale against Roger Taylor and was played on the Centre Court. Additional colour broadcasts were made during the afternoons of the following week as well as 30-minute highlight programmes shown each evening.

== Champions ==
=== Seniors ===
==== Men's singles ====
(Australia) John Newcombe defeated (West Germany) Wilhelm Bungert, 6–3, 6–1, 6–1

==== Women's singles ====
(United States) Billie Jean King defeated (United Kingdom) Ann Jones, 6–3, 6–4

==== Men's doubles ====
(South Africa) Bob Hewitt / (South Africa) Frew McMillan defeated (Australia) Roy Emerson / (Australia) Ken Fletcher, 6–2, 6–3, 6–4

==== Women's doubles ====
(United States) Rosie Casals / (United States) Billie Jean King defeated (Brazil) Maria Bueno / (United States) Nancy Richey, 9–11, 6–4, 6–2

==== Mixed doubles ====
(Australia) Owen Davidson / (United States) Billie Jean King defeated (Australia) Ken Fletcher / (Brazil) Maria Bueno, 7–5, 6–2

=== Juniors ===
==== Boys' singles ====
(Spain) Manuel Orantes defeated (United States) Mike Estep, 6–2, 6–0

==== Girls' singles ====
(Netherlands) Judith Salomé defeated (Sweden) Margaretta Strandberg, 6–4, 6–2

== See also ==
- Wimbledon Pro

Preceded by 1967 French Championships	Grand Slams	Succeeded by 1967 U.S. National Championships
