= 1968 Suisse Open Gstaad =

- Date: 22–28 July
- Edition: 23rd
- Draw: 32S / 16D
- Surface: Clay / outdoor
- Location: Gstaad, Switzerland

Champions

Men's singles
- (South Africa) Cliff Drysdale

Women's singles
- (South Africa) Annette du Plooy

Men's doubles
- (Australia) John Newcombe / (United States) Dennis Ralston

Women's doubles
- (Mexico) Rosie Reyes / (South Africa) Annette du Plooy

Mixed doubles
- (United States) Julie Heldman / (Denmark) Torben Ulrich
- Suisse Open Gstaad

The 1968 Suisse Open Gstaad was a combined men's and women's professional tennis tournament played on outdoor clay courts in Gstaad, Switzerland. It was the 23rd edition of the tournament and was held from 22 July through 28 July 1968. Cliff Drysdale and Annette du Plooy won the singles titles.

== Finals ==
=== Men's singles ===
(South Africa) Cliff Drysdale defeated (Netherlands) Tom Okker 6–3, 6–3, 6–0

=== Women's singles ===
(South Africa) Annette du Plooy defeated (United States) Julie Heldman 6–0, 6–1

=== Men's doubles ===
(Australia) John Newcombe / (United States) Dennis Ralston defeated (Australia) Mal Anderson / (Netherlands) Tom Okker 8–10, 12–10, 12–14, 6–3, 6–3

=== Women's doubles ===
(Mexico) Rosie Reyes / (South Africa) Annette du Plooy defeated (Australia) Helen Amos / (Mexico) Elena Subirats 6–1, 6–3

=== Mixed doubles ===
(United States) Julie Heldman / (Denmark) Torben Ulrich defeated (Italy) Massimo di Domenico / (Mexico) Elena Subirats 6–2, 6–2
