= 1967 Wimbledon Championships – Men's doubles =

Men's doubles
- 1967 Wimbledon Championships

Final
- Champions: (South Africa) Bob Hewitt (South Africa) Frew McMillan
- Runners-up: (Australia) Roy Emerson (Australia) Ken Fletcher
- Score: 6–2, 6–3, 6–4

Details
- Draw: 64 (4 Q )
- Seeds: 4

Events
Singles	men	women		boys	girls
Doubles	men	women	mixed	boys	girls
← 1966 ·	Wimbledon Championships	· 1968 →

Ken Fletcher and John Newcombe were the defending champions, but decided not to compete together. Newcome partnered with Tony Roche but lost in the quarterfinals to Peter Curtis and Graham Stilwell.

Bob Hewitt and Frew McMillan defeated Fletcher and his partner Roy Emerson in the final, 6–2, 6–3, 6–4 to win the gentlemen's doubles tennis title at the 1967 Wimbledon Championship.

== Seeds ==
1. (Australia) John Newcombe / (Australia) Tony Roche (quarterfinals)
2. (South Africa) Bob Hewitt / (South Africa) Frew McMillan (champions)
3. (Australia) Bill Bowrey / (Australia) Owen Davidson (semifinals)
4. (Australia) Roy Emerson / (Australia) Ken Fletcher (final)

Click on the seed number of a player to go to their draw section.

== Draw ==
=== Key ===
- Q = Qualifier
- WC = Wild card
- LL = Lucky loser
- Alt = Alternate
- ITF = ITF entry
- PR = Protected ranking
- SR = Special ranking
- SE = Special exempt
- JE = Junior exempt
- JR = Junior Accelerator Programme entrant
- CO = College Accelerator Programme entrant
- NG = Next Gen Accelerator Program entrant
- w/o = Walkover
- r = Retired
- d = Defaulted

=== Finals ===
Quarterfinals
1	(Australia) John Newcombe (Australia) Tony Roche	4	6	4	6	6
(United Kingdom) Peter Curtis (United Kingdom) Graham Stilwell	6	4	6	3	8
4	(Australia) Roy Emerson (Australia) Ken Fletcher	6	6	6
(India) Ramanathan Krishnan (India) Jaidip Mukerjea	4	2	2
(United States) Clark Graebner (United States) Marty Riessen	1	6	5	3
3	(Australia) Bill Bowrey (Australia) Owen Davidson	6	3	7	6
(South Africa) Cliff Drysdale (Denmark) Torben Ulrich	6	0	2
2	(South Africa) Bob Hewitt (South Africa) Frew McMillan	8	6	6

Semifinals
(United Kingdom) Peter Curtis (United Kingdom) Graham Stilwell	4	6	6	7	7
4	(Australia) Roy Emerson (Australia) Ken Fletcher	6	8	4	5	9
3	(Australia) Bill Bowrey (Australia) Owen Davidson	2	8	2
2	(South Africa) Bob Hewitt (South Africa) Frew McMillan	6	10	6

Final
4	(Australia) Roy Emerson (Australia) Ken Fletcher	2	3	4
2	(South Africa) Bob Hewitt (South Africa) Frew McMillan	6	6	6

=== Top half ===
==== Section 1 ====
First round
1	(Australia) John Newcombe (Australia) Tony Roche	6	6	6
Q	(United Kingdom) Geoffrey Bluett (Australia) Ray Wilson	4	2	4
(France) Pierre Darmon (France) François Jauffret	3	7	7	7
(Chile) Patricio Cornejo (Chile) Patricio Rodríguez	6	5	5	5
(United States) Frank Froehling (Mexico) Rafael Osuna	6	8	11
(United States) Donald Dell (Argentina) Enrique Morea	2	6	9
(West Germany) Harald Elschenbroich (West Germany) Uwe Gottschalk	6	4	8	6	6
(United Kingdom) Mike Sangster (United Kingdom) Bobby Wilson	3	6	6	8	2
(United Kingdom) Peter Curtis (United Kingdom) Graham Stilwell	6	3	8	4	6
(United States) Jim McManus (United States) Jim Osborne	4	6	6	6	1
(United Kingdom) Gerald Battrick (United Kingdom) David Lloyd	6	6	8	6	6
(France) Michel Leclercq (France) Bernard Montrenaud	3	8	10	2	2
Q	(Australia) John Brown (Sweden) Lars Ölander	3	4	4
(United States) Charlie Pasarell (United States) Cliff Richey	6	6	6
(Brazil) Thomaz Koch (Brazil) José Edison Mandarino	6	4	6	6
Q	(Poland) Tadeusz Nowicki (Poland) Mieczysław Rybarczyk	2	6	2	3

Second round
1	(Australia) J Newcombe (Australia) A Roche	6	6	9
(France) P Darmon (France) J Jauffret	4	3	7
(United States) F Froehling (Mexico) R Osuna	10	6	3	11	6
(West Germany) H Elschenbroich (West Germany) U Gottschalk	12	4	6	9	1
(United Kingdom) P Curtis (United Kingdom) G Stilwell	9	6	6
(United Kingdom) G Battrick (United Kingdom) D Lloyd	7	2	2
(United States) C Pasarell (United States) C Richey	4	8	7	6	4
(Brazil) T Koch (Brazil) JE Mandarino	6	6	5	8	6

Third round
1	(Australia) J Newcombe (Australia) A Roche	6	6	6
(United States) F Froehling (Mexico) R Osuna	3	2	2
(United Kingdom) P Curtis (United Kingdom) G Stilwell	7	10	6	6	6
(Brazil) T Koch (Brazil) JE Mandarino	9	12	3	2	4

Quarterfinals
1	(Australia) J Newcombe (Australia) A Roche	4	6	4	6	6
(United Kingdom) P Curtis (United Kingdom) G Stilwell	6	4	6	3	8

==== Section 2 ====
First round
4	(Australia) Roy Emerson (Australia) Ken Fletcher	6	6	6
(Socialist Federal Republic of Yugoslavia) Boro Jovanović (Socialist Federal Republic of Yugoslavia) Nikola Pilić	2	1	4
(United Kingdom) John Barrett (United Kingdom) Keith Wooldridge	3	7	7	3	4
(United States) Bill Hoogs (South Africa) Jack Saul	6	5	5	6	6
(Belgium) Eric Drossart (Belgium) Claude De Gronckel	2	6	9	3	7
(Czechoslovakia) Jan Kodeš (Czechoslovakia) Štěpán Koudelka	6	2	7	6	5
(United States) Bob Lutz (United States) Stan Smith	6	15	8	3
(South Africa) Bob Maud (South Africa) Ray Moore	8	13	10	6
(West Germany) Ingo Buding (West Germany) Wilhelm Bungert	7	6	6
(Japan) Isao Kobayashi (Japan) Ichizo Konishi	5	3	2
(United States) Gene Scott (United States) Vic Seixas	4	4	3
(India) Ramanathan Krishnan (India) Jaidip Mukerjea	6	6	6
(Australia) John Cooper (Australia) Dick Crealy	13	6	6
(United Kingdom) Clay Iles (United Kingdom) Stanley Matthews	11	3	4
(Soviet Union) Sergei Likhachev (Soviet Union) Alex Metreveli	11	4	10	10	4
(Denmark) Jan Leschly (Denmark) Jørgen Ulrich	9	6	8	12	6

Second round
4	(Australia) R Emerson (Australia) K Fletcher	6	7	6
(United States) W Hoogs (South Africa) J Saul	4	5	4
(Belgium) E Drossart (Belgium) C De Gronckel	8	4	11	6
(South Africa) R Maud (South Africa) R Moore	6	6	9	4
(West Germany) I Buding (West Germany) W Bungert	2	6	4	3
(India) R Krishnan (India) J Mukerjea	6	3	6	6
(Australia) J Cooper (Australia) R Crealy	4	4	10
(Denmark) J Leschly (Denmark) J Ulrich	6	6	12

Third round
4	(Australia) R Emerson (Australia) K Fletcher	1	6	6	6
(Belgium) E Drossart (Belgium) C De Gronckel	6	4	2	3
(India) R Krishnan (India) J Mukerjea	11	9	3	6	6
(Denmark) J Leschly (Denmark) J Ulrich	9	11	6	2	2

Quarterfinals
4	(Australia) R Emerson (Australia) K Fletcher	6	6	6
(India) R Krishnan (India) J Mukerjea	4	2	2

=== Bottom half ===
==== Section 3 ====
First round
(United Kingdom) Ted Beards (United Kingdom) Roy Dixon	5	4	6	8
(Australia) Bob Carmichael (Australia) Brian Tobin	7	6	4	10
(Chile) Ernesto Aguirre (Chile) Jaime Pinto Bravo	1	2	2
(Australia) Allan Stone (Australia) Colin Stubs	6	6	6
(Australia) Martin Mulligan (Italy) Nicola Pietrangeli	3	4	4
(United States) Clark Graebner (United States) Marty Riessen	6	6	6
(United Kingdom) John Clifton (United Kingdom) Paul Hutchins	6	6	3	6
(Czechoslovakia) Milan Holeček (Czechoslovakia) Jan Kukal	1	3	6	1
(Spain) José María Gisbert (France) Bernard Paul	2	6	6	6
(Jamaica) Lance Lumsden (Jamaica) Richard Russell	6	1	4	2
(France) Jean-Baptiste Chanfreau (France) Jean-Pierre Courcol	0	3	2
(United Kingdom) Mark Cox (United Kingdom) Roger Taylor	6	6	6
(United Kingdom) Michael Hann (New Zealand) John McDonald	8	9	5	7	3
(Soviet Union) Vladimir Korotkov (Soviet Union) Toomas Leius	6	7	7	9	6
(Romania) Ilie Năstase (Romania) Ion Țiriac	8	6	6	4
3	(Australia) Bill Bowrey (Australia) Owen Davidson	6	8	8	6

Second round
(Australia) R Carmichael (Australia) B Tobin	3	6	6	6
(Australia) A Stone (Australia) C Stubs	6	4	4	2
(United States) C Graebner (United States) M Riessen	8	6	6
(United Kingdom) J Clifton (United Kingdom) P Hutchins	6	3	4
(Spain) JM Gisbert (France) B Paul	2	0	3
(United Kingdom) M Cox (United Kingdom) R Taylor	6	6	6
(Soviet Union) V Korotkov (Soviet Union) T Leius	2	6	3
3	(Australia) W Bowrey (Australia) O Davidson	6	8	6

Third round
(Australia) R Carmichael (Australia) B Tobin	2	6	2
(United States) C Graebner (United States) M Riessen	6	8	6
(United Kingdom) M Cox (United Kingdom) R Taylor	1	2	28
3	(Australia) W Bowrey (Australia) O Davidson	6	6	30

Quarterfinals
(United States) C Graebner (United States) M Riessen	1	6	5	3
3	(Australia) W Bowrey (Australia) O Davidson	6	3	7	6

==== Section 4 ====
First round
(South Africa) Cliff Drysdale (Denmark) Torben Ulrich	4	6	6	6
(Hungary) István Gulyás (Hungary) András Szikszai	6	3	2	4
(West Germany) Hans-Joachim Plötz (West Germany) Bernd Weinmann	4	3	23	9
(Spain) José Luis Arilla (Spain) Manuel Santana	6	6	21	11
(Colombia) William Álvarez (Colombia) Iván Molina	6	8	6
(Italy) Marco Ghiradelli (Italy) Gaetano Di Maso	4	6	2
Q	(United States) John Pickens (United States) Bill Tym	10	2	3
(France) Patrice Beust (France) Daniel Contet	12	6	6
(New Zealand) Brian Fairlie (New Zealand) Kevin Woolcott	13	13	5	6	2
(Canada) Keith Carpenter (Australia) Ronald McKenzie	11	11	7	8	6
(Australia) Terry Addison (Australia) Ray Keldie	8	6	6	3	7
(Australia) John Cottrill (Australia) Jimmy Moore	10	4	1	6	5
(Australia) Bob Howe (South Africa) Abe Segal	6	4	6	8
(South Africa) Graydon Garner (South Africa) Peter Mors	2	6	3	6
(Netherlands) Tom Okker (Australia) Ray Ruffels	8	2	0
2	(South Africa) Bob Hewitt (South Africa) Frew McMillan	10	6	6

Second round
(South Africa) C Drysdale (Denmark) T Ulrich	6	11	6	4	6
(Spain) JL Arilla (Spain) M Santana	8	9	1	6	3
(Colombia) W Álvarez (Colombia) I Molina	6	4	2	2
(France) P Beust (France) D Contet	3	6	6	6
(Canada) K Carpenter (Australia) R McKenzie	4	3	8	4
(Australia) T Addison (Australia) R Keldie	6	6	6	6
(Australia) R Howe (South Africa) A Segal	3	3	2
2	(South Africa) R Hewitt (South Africa) F McMillan	6	6	6

Third round
(South Africa) C Drysdale (Denmark) T Ulrich	12	6	9
(France) P Beust (France) D Contet	10	4	7
(Australia) T Addison (Australia) R Keldie	5	4	5
2	(South Africa) R Hewitt (South Africa) F McMillan	7	6	7

Quarterfinals
(South Africa) C Drysdale (Denmark) T Ulrich	6	0	2
2	(South Africa) R Hewitt (South Africa) F McMillan	8	6	6
