= 1968 Wimbledon Championships – Girls' singles =

Girls' singles
- 1968 Wimbledon Championships

Final
- Champion: (United States) Kristy Pigeon
- Runner-up: (Australia) Lesley Hunt
- Score: 6–4, 6–3

Details
- Draw: 25

Events
Singles	men	women		boys	girls
Doubles	men	women	mixed	boys	girls
← 1967 ·	Wimbledon Championships	· 1969 →

Kristy Pigeon defeated Lesley Hunt in the final, 6–4, 6–3 to win the girls' singles tennis title at the 1968 Wimbledon Championships.

== Draw ==
=== Key ===
- Q = Qualifier
- WC = Wild card
- LL = Lucky loser
- Alt = Alternate
- SE = Special exempt
- PR = Protected ranking
- ITF = ITF entry
- JE = Junior exempt
- w/o = Walkover
- r = Retired
- d = Defaulted
- SR = Special ranking

=== Finals ===
Semifinals
(Australia) Lesley Hunt	6	6
(Sweden) Maria Strandberg	1	2
(United States) Kristy Pigeon	6	6
(Japan) Kazuko Sawamatsu	1	1

Final
(Australia) Lesley Hunt	4	3
(United States) Kristy Pigeon	6	6

=== Top half ===
First round
(United Kingdom) Veronica Burton
(Monaco) L Vanderpol	w/o
(Socialist Federal Republic of Yugoslavia) Alenka Pipan	0	6	7
(Venezuela) A Connelly	6	1	5
(Italy) Daniela Porzio	6	6
(Greece) A Koutsouris	2	3
(Sweden) Maria Strandberg	6	6
(Republic of Ireland) Nora McMordie	1	2
(Switzerland) E Bucher	4	2
(Belgium) C Vangheluwe	6	6

Second round
(Austria) E Lehner	1	1
(Australia) Lesley Hunt	6	6
(Israel) Paulina Peisachov	2	2
(United Kingdom) V Burton	6	6
(Socialist Federal Republic of Yugoslavia) A Pipan	4	6	2
(Italy) D Porzio	6	3	6
(Sweden) M Strandberg	6	4	6
(Belgium) C Vangheluwe	1	6	3

Quarterfinals
(Australia) L Hunt	8	6
(United Kingdom) V Burton	6	4
(Italy) D Porzio	4	4
(Sweden) M Strandberg	6	6

Semifinals
(Australia) L Hunt	6	6
(Sweden) M Strandberg	1	2

=== Bottom half ===
First round
(Uruguay) Fiorella Bonicelli	w/o
(Soviet Union) Zaiga Jansone
(Czechoslovakia) Mirka Koželuhová	2	12
(West Germany) S Thunig	6	14
(Norway) H Hancke	2	1
(United States) Kristy Pigeon	6	6
(Brazil) MC Diaz	3	6	6
(Denmark) D Ekner	6	3	3

Second round
(Soviet Union) Z Jansone	6	6
(West Germany) S Thunig	1	3
(United States) K Pigeon	6	6
(Brazil) MC Diaz	1	0
(Hungary) A Gráczol	2	0
(Japan) Kazuko Sawamatsu	6	6
(Sweden) Nina Blom	1	1
(Mexico) P Montaño	6	6

Quarterfinals
(Soviet Union) Z Jansone	4	1
(United States) K Pigeon	6	6
(Japan) K Sawamatsu	6	6
(Mexico) P Montaño	3	2

Semifinals
(United States) K Pigeon	6	6
(Japan) K Sawamatsu	1	1
