= Christina Lindström =

Finnish tennis player

- Country (sports): Finland
- Born: 18 October 1945 (age 79)

Singles

Grand Slam singles results
- French Open: 2R (1968)

Doubles

Grand Slam doubles results
- French Open: 1R (1968)

Christina Lindström (born 18 October 1945) is a Finnish former tennis player.

Lindström won a total of 19 national championships, across singles and doubles. She featured in the main draw for the 1968 French Open and represented Finland in a Federation Cup tie that year against the Netherlands. Her younger sister, Birgitta, was her Federation Cup teammate.
