= Maria-Cristina Borba-Dias =

Brazilian tennis player

- Country (sports): Brazil
- Born: 26 June 1951 (age 73)

Singles

Grand Slam singles results
- French Open: 1R (1968)

Doubles

Grand Slam doubles results
- French Open: 1R (1968)

Grand Slam mixed doubles results
- French Open: 1R (1968)

Maria-Cristina Borba-Dias (born 26 June 1951) is a Brazilian former professional tennis player.

Borba-Dias competed at the 1968 French Open and on the same trip represented the Brazil Federation Cup team in a tie against Australia at Roland Garros. Brazil were outmatched by the Australians, who would go on to win the title, with Borba-Dias losing to Kerry Melville in the singles, then to Melville and Margaret Court in the doubles.
