= Danuta Wieczorek =

- Full name: Danuta Wieczorek-Szwaj
- Country (sports): Poland
- Born: 27 April 1949 (age 76) Pszczyna, Poland

Singles

Grand Slam singles results
- French Open: 1R (1969)

Doubles

Grand Slam doubles results
- French Open: 1R (1969)

Grand Slam mixed doubles results
- French Open: 1R (1969)

Danuta Wieczorek-Szwaj (born 27 April 1949) is a Polish former professional tennis player.

Born in Pszczyna, Wieczorek grew up in the south of Poland and was a Wimbledon junior semi-finalist.

Wieczorek, an eight-time national singles champion, represented Poland in the 1968 Federation Cup competition, winning two singles rubbers. One of those wins came against Astrid Suurbeek in a World Group second round loss to the Netherlands. In 1969 she featured in the singles and doubles mains draw of the French Open.

== See also ==
- List of Poland Fed Cup team representatives
