= Judy Congdon =

British tennis player (born 1948)

- Country (sports): Great Britain
- Born: 3 December 1948 (age 76)
- Plays: Right-handed

Singles

Grand Slam singles results
- Wimbledon: 2R (1968, 1969)

Doubles

Grand Slam doubles results
- Wimbledon: 2R (1969)

Grand Slam mixed doubles results
- Wimbledon: 1R (1972)

Judy Congdon (born 3 December 1948) is a British former professional tennis player.

Congdon, who studied at Millfield, is a native of Exeter in Devon.

A two-time British junior champion, Congdon was girls' singles runner-up to Birgitta Lindström at the 1966 Wimbledon Championships and featured in the Wimbledon women's singles main draw three times. In the qualifying rounds of the 1971 Wimbledon Championships she played in the tournament's first ever tiebreak.
