= Roberta Beltrame =

Italian tennis player

- Country (sports): Italy
- Born: 19 April 1938 Ferrara, Italy
- Plays: Right-handed

Singles

Grand Slam singles results
- French Open: 3R (1961, 1962, 1964, 1966)
- Wimbledon: 2R (1967)

Roberta Beltrame (born 19 April 1938) is an Italian former tennis player.

Born in Ferrara, Beltrame was a seven-time winner of the Italian Tennis Championships, twice in women's doubles and five times in mixed doubles. During the 1960s she made main draw appearances at the French Championships and Wimbledon. She married tennis coach Gerardo Bonardi.
