= Marijke Schaar =

Dutch former tennis player (born 1944)

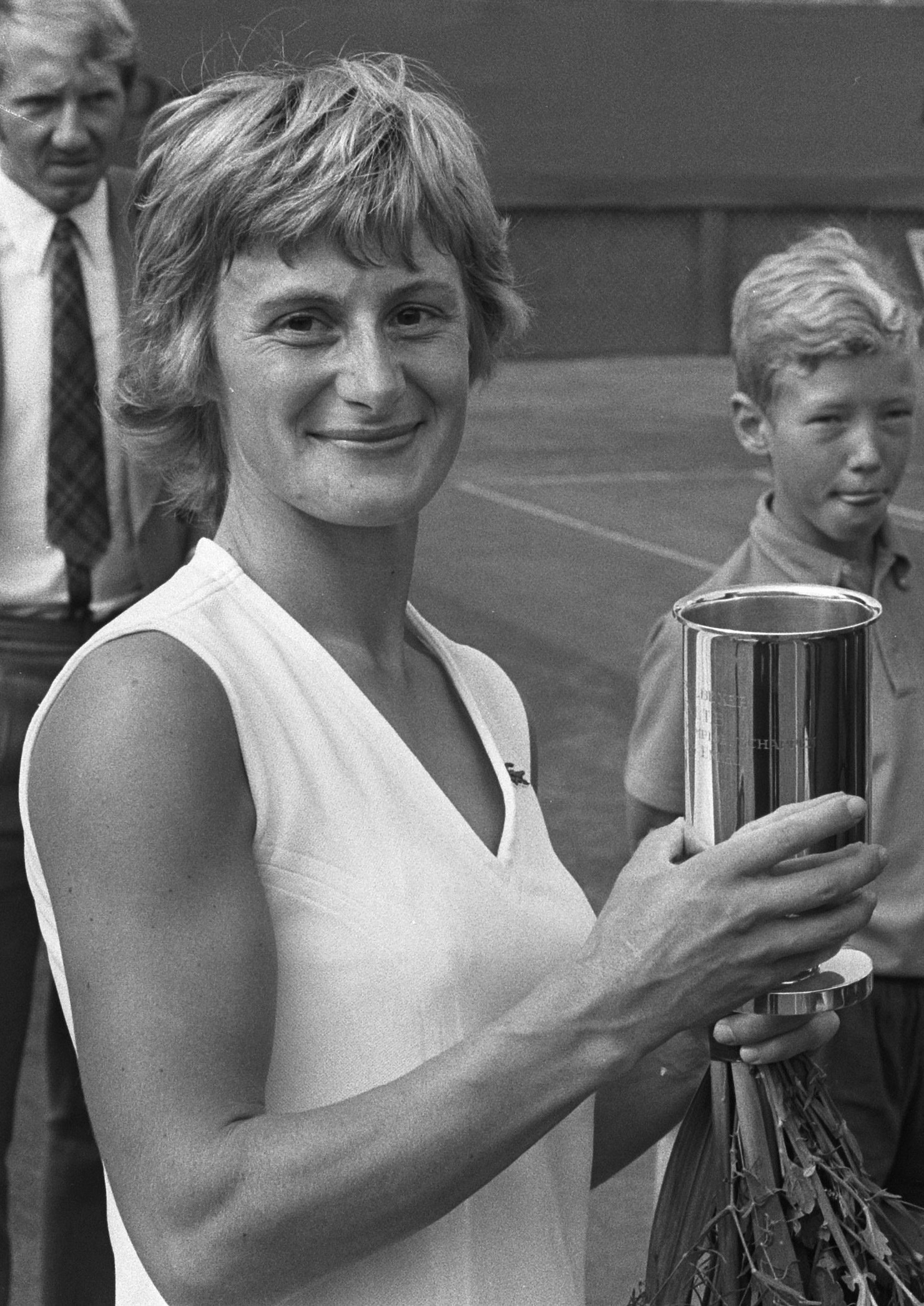
- Schaar in 1971
- Full name: Marijke Schaar Jansen
- Country (sports): Netherlands
- Born: 12 November 1944 (age 81) The Hague, Netherlands
- Plays: Ambidextrous (forehand both sides)

Singles
- Career titles: 0
- Highest ranking: No. 21 (1971)

Grand Slam singles results
- French Open: SF (1971)
- Wimbledon: 4R (1971)

Grand Slam doubles results
- French Open: QF (1971)
- Wimbledon: 2R (1972, 1973, 1974)

Team competitions
- Fed Cup: F (1968)

Marijke Schaar (born 12 November 1944), also known under her maiden name Marijke Jansen, is a former Dutch female tennis player who was active during the 1960s and 1970s. She reached a highest singles ranking of world number 21 in 1971. She had her most successful year in 1971 when she reached the semifinal of the singles event at the French Open, losing to eventual champion Evonne Goolagong, and the fourth round of the Wimbledon Championships.

In March 1969 she won the singles title at the Cannes Championships, defeating compatriot Betty Stöve in the final in three sets.

Schaar was a member of the Dutch Federation Cup team which reached the final against Australia in 1968.

On 23 November 1968 she married Nico Schaar.

== Career finals ==
=== Singles (2 losses) ===
Result	W/L	Date	Tournament	Surface	Opponent	Score
Loss	0–1	Jul 1972	Kitzbuhel, Austria	Clay	(West Germany) Katja Ebbinghaus	5–7, 3–6
Loss	0–2	Jul 1974	Båstad, Sweden	Clay	(United Kingdom) Sue Barker	1–6, 5–7

=== Doubles (1 loss) ===
Result	W/L	Date	Tournament	Surface	Partner	Opponents	Score
Loss	0–1	Apr 1969	Bournemouth, England	Hard	(Netherlands) Ada Bakker	(Australia) Margaret Court (Australia) Judy Tegart	1–6, 4–6
