= Birgitta Lindström =

Finnish former tennis player (born 1948)

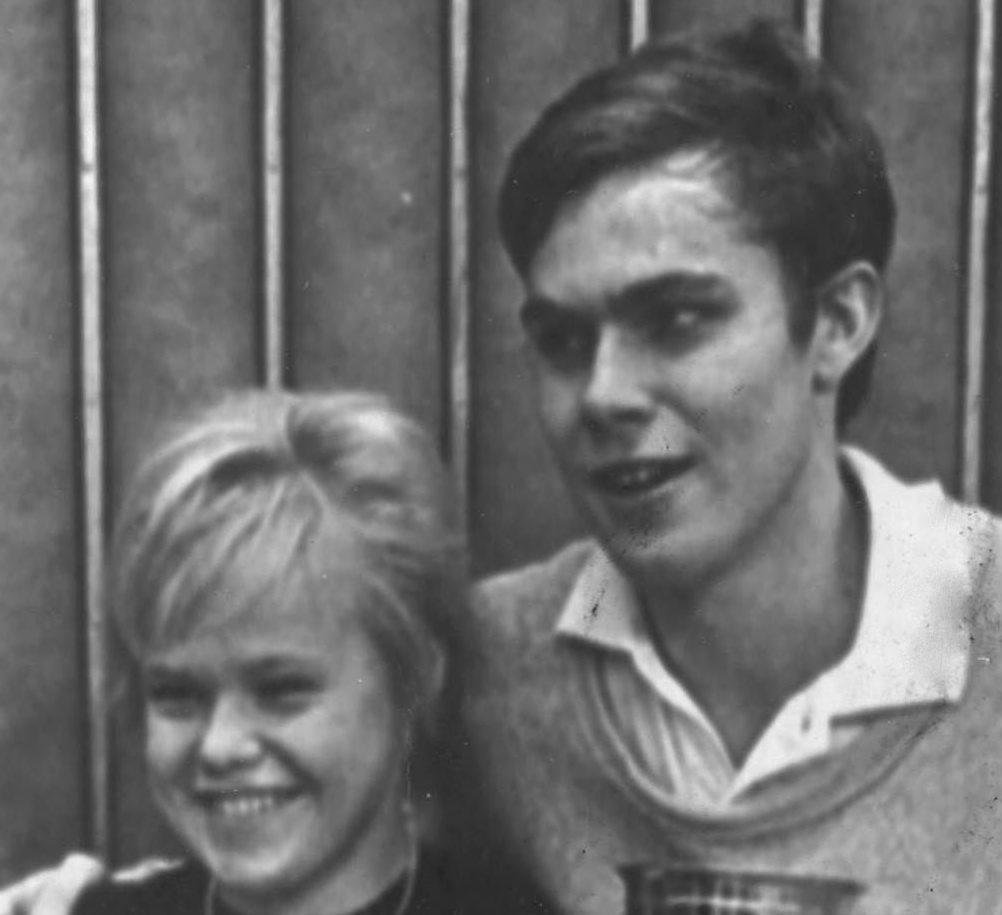
- Lindström and Bengt Åberg
- Country (sports): Finland
- Born: 14 January 1948 (age 77)

Singles

Grand Slam singles results
- French Open: 2R (1968)
- Wimbledon: 1R (1967, 1969, 1971)

Doubles

Grand Slam doubles results
- French Open: 2R (1971)

Grand Slam mixed doubles results
- French Open: 2R (1971)
- Wimbledon: 2R (1967, 1969)

Birgitta Lindström (born 14 January 1948) is a Finnish former tennis player. She has also been known by her married name Birgitta Warbach.

Lindström was the girls' singles champion at the 1966 Wimbledon Championships and the first Finn to win a grand slam title. She represented Finland at the 1968 Federation Cup, where she teamed up with elder sister Christina. In the late 1970s she was the women's tennis coach at Syracuse University.
