= Judith Salomé =

Dutch tennis player

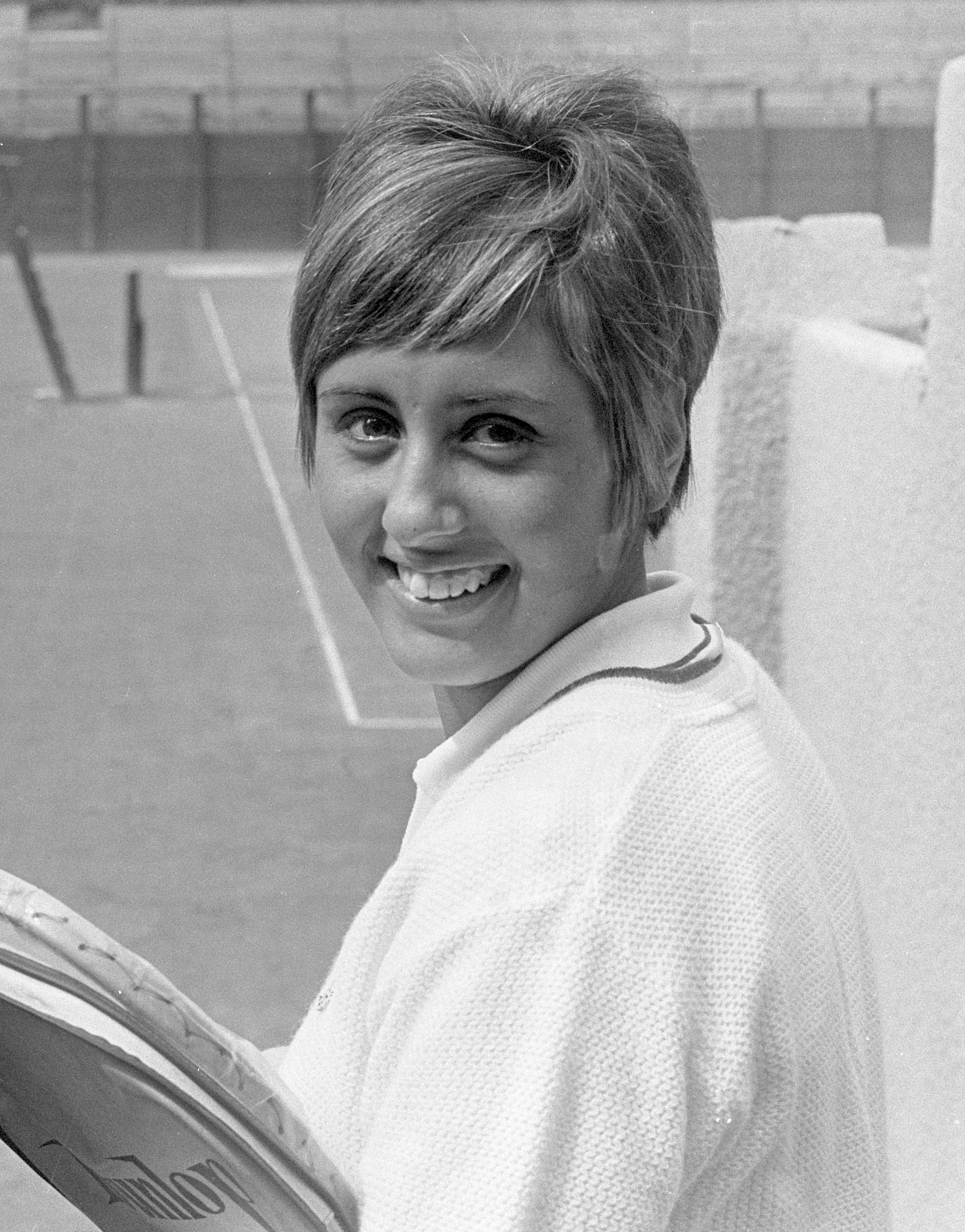
- Judith Salomé in 1967
- Country (sports): Netherlands
- Born: 10 February 1949 (age 76); Amsterdam, the Netherlands

Singles
- Career record: 1–4
- Career titles: 0 WTA, 0 ITF

Doubles
- Career record: 0–6
- Career titles: 0 WTA, 0 ITF

Judith Salomé (born 10 February 1949) is a retired Dutch tennis player who won the Junior Wimbledon title in 1967. Between 1968 and 1970 she competed in singles and doubles in Grand Slam tournaments such as Wimbledon, French Open and the Australian Open, but was eliminated in the first round on most occasions.

After marrying Robert Lenting, she changed her last name to Lenting-Salomé.
