= Jitka Volavková =

Czech tennis player

- Full name: Jitka Horčičková Volavková
- Country (sports): Czechoslovakia
- Born: 1939 (age 86–87) Prague, Czechoslovakia

Singles

Grand Slam singles results
- French Open: 4R (1965)
- Wimbledon: 4R (1967)
- US Open: 1R (1969)

Doubles

Grand Slam doubles results
- French Open: 2R (1968)
- Wimbledon: 3R (1966)
- US Open: 1R (1969)

Grand Slam mixed doubles results
- Wimbledon: 2R (1968)
- US Open: 1R (1969)

Jitka Volavková (born 1939) is a Czech former professional tennis player.

Playing for Czechoslovakia in the Fed Cup, Volavková has accumulated a win–loss record of 5–6.

She lost to the British player Ann Jones in the fourth round at the 1965 French Open. She lost to the British player Virginia Wade in the fourth round at the 1967 Wimbledon.

== Career finals ==
=== Singles (5–6) ===
Result	No.	Year	location	Surface	Opponent	Score
Loss	1	August 1962	Ostrava, Czechoslovakia	Clay	(Czechoslovakia) Věra Suková	2–6, 2–6
Loss	2.	June 1964	Prague, Czechoslovakia	Clay	(Czechoslovakia) Věra Suková	3–6, 2–6
Win	1.	July 1964	Ostrava, Czechoslovakia	Clay	(Czechoslovakia) Vlasta Kodešová	3–6, 6–1, 6–2
Loss	3.	February 1965	Prague, Czechoslovakia	Hard (i)	(Czechoslovakia) Vlasta Kodešová	7–9, 4–6
Loss	4.	April 1965	Aix-en-Provence, France	Clay	(Australia) Robin Lesh	6–3, 4–6, 4–6
Win	2.	September 1965	Belgrade, Yugoslavia	Clay	(Bulgaria) Maria Chakarova	6–4, 6–1
Win	3.	September 1965	Bratislava, Czechoslovakia	Clay	(Czechoslovakia) Marie Neumannová	6–4, 7–5
Win	4.	July 1966	Ostrava, Czechoslovakia	Clay	(Czechoslovakia) Vlasta Kodešová	6–3, 6–2
Loss	5.	April 1967	Hampstead, United Kingdom	Clay	(United Kingdom) Christine Truman	5–7, 1–6
Loss	6.	April 1967	Southport, United Kingdom	Clay	(United Kingdom) Rita Bentley	7–9, 3–6
Win	5.	July 1967	Newcastle, United Kingdom	Hard	(United Kingdom) Nell Truman	7–5, 2–6, 7–5

=== Doubles (4–7) ===
Result	No.	Year	location	Surface	Partner	Opponents	Score
Loss	1.	July 1961	Prague, Czechoslovakia	Clay	(Czechoslovakia) Olga Lendlová	(Australia) Robyn Ebbern (Australia) Jan Lehane	6–3, 3–6, 0–6
Win	1.	July 1962	Budapest, Hungary	Clay	(Soviet Union) Anna Dmitrieva	(Hungary) Klara Bardoczy (Hungary) Zsuzsa Körmöczy	8–6, 6-2
Loss	2.	July 1964	Ostrava, Czechoslovakia	Clay	(Czechoslovakia) Vlasta Kodešová	(Czechoslovakia) Olga Lendlová (Czechoslovakia) Alena Palmeová	2–6, 6–8
Loss	3.	August 1964	Kitzbühel, Austria	Clay	(Czechoslovakia) Vlasta Kodešová	(France) Janine Lieffrig (United Kingdom) Elizabeth Starkie	2–6, 2–6
Loss	4.	August 1965	Kitzbühel, Austria	Clay	(Czechoslovakia) Alena Palmeová	(South Africa) Annette Van Zyl (Australia) Gail Sherriff	1–6, 0–6
Loss	5.	August 1965	Portschach, Austria	Clay	(Czechoslovakia) Vlasta Kodešová	(Australia) Margaret Smith (Austria) Sonja Pachta	3–6, 2–6
Win	2.	September 1965	Belgrade, Yugoslavia	Clay	(Bulgaria) Maria Chakarova	(Romania) Judith Dibar (Poland) Ilona Fudala	6–1, 7–5
Loss	6.	May 1966	Prague, Czechoslovakia	Clay	(Czechoslovakia) Vlasta Kodešová	(Australia) Karen Krantzcke (Australia) Kerry Melville	0–6, 2–6
Win	3.	July 1966	Ostrava, Czechoslovakia	Clay	(Czechoslovakia) Vlasta Kodešová	(Czechoslovakia) Olga Lendlová (Czechoslovakia) Alena Palmeová	1–6, 6–3, 12–10
Loss	7.	April 1967	Southport, United Kingdom	Clay	(United Kingdom) Belinda Orchard	(United Kingdom) Rita Bentley (United Kingdom) Sally Holdsworth	w/o
Win	4.	June 1968	Prague, Czechoslovakia	Clay	(Czechoslovakia) Vlasta Kodešová	(Czechoslovakia) Marie Neumannová (Czechoslovakia) Jana Pikorová	6–4, 6–3
