= Nancy Richey =

American tennis player

- Country (sports): United States
- Born: August 23, 1942 (age 83) San Angelo, Texas, US
- Height: 5 ft 3 in (1.60 m)
- Plays: Right-handed
- Int. Tennis HoF: 2003 (member page)

Singles
- Career record: 664–169 (79.7%)
- Career titles: 73
- Highest ranking: No.2 (1969)

Grand Slam singles results
- Australian Open: W (1967)
- French Open: W (1968)
- Wimbledon: SF (1968)
- US Open: F (1966, 1969)

Doubles
- Career record: 150-105 (58.8%)
- Career titles: 25

Grand Slam doubles results
- Australian Open: W (1966)
- French Open: F (1969)
- Wimbledon: W (1966)
- US Open: W (1965, 1966)

Grand Slam mixed doubles results
- Wimbledon: QF (1965)

Team competitions
- Fed Cup: W (1969)

Nancy Richey (born August 23, 1942) is an American former tennis player. Richey won two major singles titles (the 1967 Australian Championships and 1968 French Open) and four major women's doubles titles (the 1965 US Championships, 1966 Australian Championships, 1966 Wimbledon Championships, and 1966 US Championships). She was ranked world No. 2 in singles at year-end in 1969. Richey won 73 singles titles during her career and helped the US win the Federation Cup in 1969. She won the singles title at the U.S. Women's Clay Court Championships a record six consecutive years, from 1963 through 1968.

Richey married Kenneth S. Gunter on December 15, 1970. They were divorced on December 28, 1976, and Richey reverted to her maiden name. She is the sister of American tennis player Cliff Richey. They were the first brother-sister combination to both be concurrently ranked in the USA Top Ten. They were ranked in the Top Three concurrently in 1965, 1967, 1969 and 1970. Nancy Richey was inducted into the International Tennis Hall of Fame in 2003.

== Grand Slam finals ==
=== Singles: 6 (2 titles, 4 runners-up) ===
Result	Year	Championship	Surface	Opponent	Score
Loss	1966	Australian Championships	Grass	(Australia) Margaret Smith	walkover
Loss	1966	French Championships	Clay	(United Kingdom) Ann Haydon Jones	3–6, 1–6
Loss	1966	U.S. Championships	Grass	(Brazil) Maria Bueno	3–6, 1–6
Win	1967	Australian Championships	Grass	(Australia) Lesley Turner	6–1, 6–4
Win	1968	French Open	Clay	(United Kingdom) Ann Haydon Jones	5–7, 6–4, 6–1
Loss	1969	U.S. Open	Grass	(Australia) Margaret Court	2–6, 2–6

=== Doubles: 6 (4 titles, 2 runners-up) ===
Result	Year	Championship	Surface	Partner	Opponents	Score
Win	1965	U.S. Championships	Grass	(United States) Carole Graebner	(United States) Billie Jean King (United States) Karen Hantze	6–4, 6–4
Win	1966	Australian Championships	Grass	(United States) Carole Graebner	(Australia) Margaret Court (Australia) Lesley Turner	6–4, 7–5
Win	1966	Wimbledon	Grass	(Brazil) Maria Bueno	(Australia) Margaret Court (Australia) Judy Tegart	6–3, 4–6, 6–4
Win	1966	U.S. Championships	Grass	(Brazil) Maria Bueno	(United States) Rosie Casals (United States) Billie Jean King	6–3, 6–4
Loss	1967	Wimbledon	Grass	(Brazil) Maria Bueno	(United States) Rosie Casals (United States) Billie Jean King	11–9, 4–6, 2–6
Loss	1969	French Open	Clay	(Australia) Margaret Court	(France) Françoise Dürr (United Kingdom) Ann Haydon Jones	0–6, 6–4, 5–7

== Grand Slam singles tournament timeline ==
Key
W	F	SF	QF	#R	RR	Q#	DNQ	A	NH

(W) winner; (F) finalist; (SF) semifinalist; (QF) quarterfinalist; (#R) rounds 4, 3, 2, 1; (RR) round-robin stage; (Q#) qualification round; (DNQ) did not qualify; (A) absent; (NH) not held; (SR) strike rate (events won / competed); (W–L) win–loss record.

Tournament	1958	1959	1960	1961	1962	1963	1964	1965	1966	1967	1968	1969	1970	1971	1972	1973	1974	1975	1976	1977^{1}	1978	Career SR
Australian Open	A	A	A	A	A	A	A	A	F	W	A	A	A	A	A	A	A	A	A	A / A	A	1 / 2
French Open	A	A	A	A	A	A	4R	SF	F	A	W	SF	A	SF	1R^{2}	3R	A	A	A	3R	2R	1 / 9
Wimbledon	A	A	A	2R	3R	A	QF	QF	QF	4R	SF	QF	A	QF	QF	A	A^{3}	2R	A	A	A	0 / 11
US Open	1R	3R	QF	A	3R	QF	SF	SF	F	A	A	F	SF	3R	1R	3R	QF	1R	2R	4R	1R	0 / 18
SR	0 / 1	0 / 1	0 / 1	0 / 1	0 / 2	0 / 1	0 / 3	0 / 3	0 / 4	1 / 2	1 / 2	0 / 3	0 / 1	0 / 3	0 / 2	0 / 2	0 / 1	0 / 2	0 / 1	0 / 2	0 / 2	2 / 40

^{1} The Australian Open was held twice in 1977, in January and December.
^{2} Richey did not play. Her opponent got a walkover.
^{3} Richey was seeded No. 7, but withdrew from the tournament before it began.

== See also ==
- Performance timelines for all female tennis players since 1978 who reached at least one Grand Slam final
