= Pat Walkden =

Rhodesian-South African tennis player

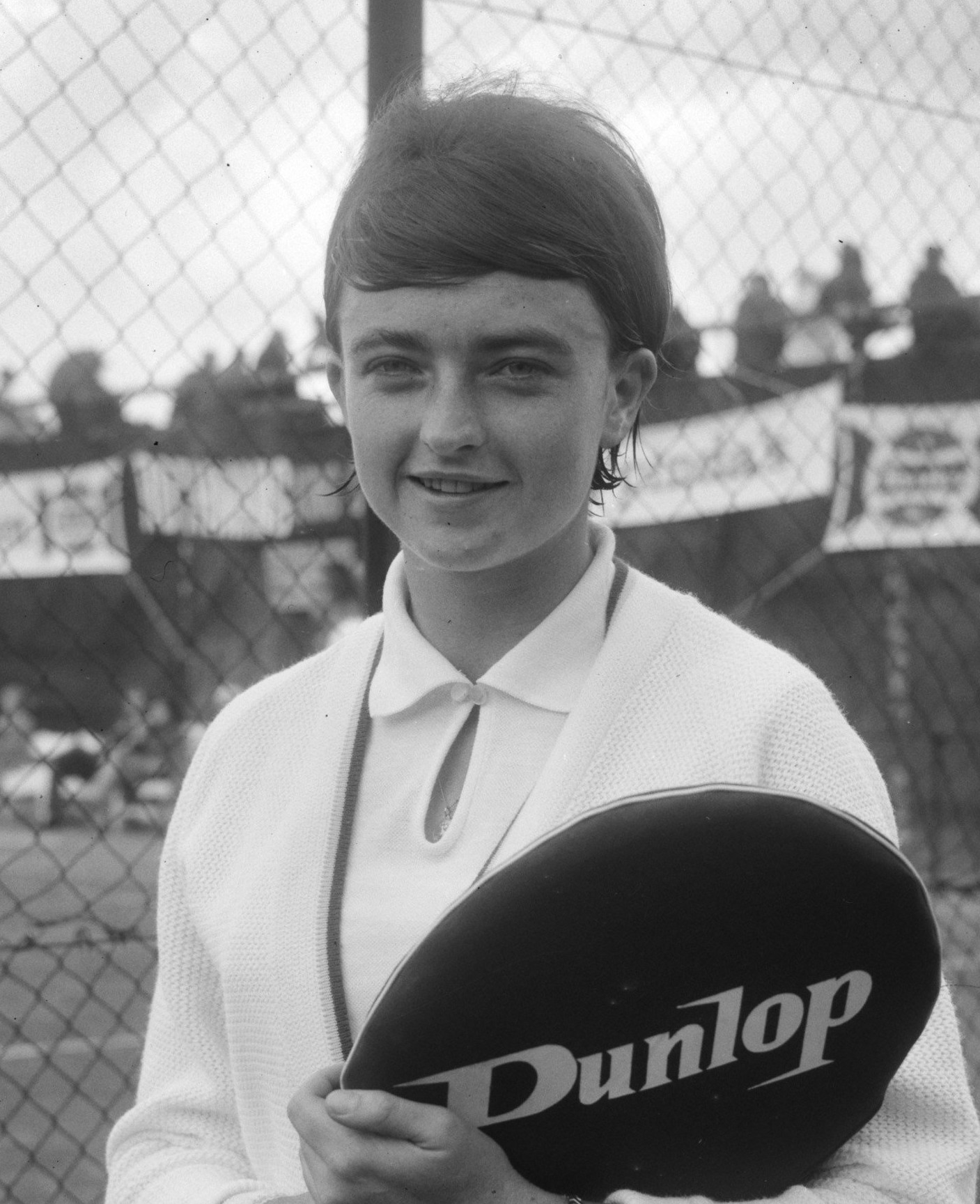
- Pat Walkden (1965)
- Full name: Patricia Molly Walkden-Pretorius
- Country (sports): Rhodesia; South Africa
- Born: 12 February 1946 (age 80) Bulawayo, Matabeleland, Southern Rhodesia (now Zimbabwe
- Plays: Right–handed

Singles
- Career record: no value

Grand Slam singles results
- French Open: 4R (1967, 1968)
- Wimbledon: 4R (1969)
- US Open: 3R (1970)

Doubles
- Career record: no value

Grand Slam doubles results
- French Open: F (1967)
- Wimbledon: SF (1970)
- US Open: SF (1967)

Grand Slam mixed doubles results
- French Open: QF (1969)
- Wimbledon: SF (1972)
- US Open: 3R (1970)

Team competitions
- Fed Cup: W (1972)

Patricia Molly "Pat" Walkden-Pretorius (born 12 February 1946) is a former female tennis player from Rhodesia and South Africa.

Walkden was a runner-up in the 1967 French Championships doubles, partnering compatriot Annette du Plooy. They lost the final in straight sets to Françoise Dürr and Gail Sherriff.

Her best singles result at a Grand Slam tournament was reaching the fourth round at the 1967 French Championships, the 1968 French Open and the 1969 Wimbledon Championships.

She played for the Rhodesian and South African Fed Cup teams in 15 ties between 1966 and 1974 comprising a record of 17 wins and 11 losses. She was part of the South African team, together with Brenda Kirk and Greta Delport, that won the Federation Cup in 1972 after a victory in the final over Great Britain at Ellis Park in Johannesburg, South Africa.

== Career finals ==
=== Singles: 3 (3 runner-ups) ===
Result	W/L	Date	Tournament	Surface	Opponent	Score
Loss	0–1	Jul 1972	Dublin, Ireland	Grass	(Australia) Evonne Goolagong	6–2, 1–6, 2–6
Loss	0–2	May 1973	Lee-on-Solent, UK	Clay	(Australia) Evonne Goolagong	3–6, 2–6
Loss	0–3	Jun 1973	Hamburg, West Germany	Clay	(West Germany) Helga Masthoff	4–6, 1–6

=== Doubles: 13 (3 titles, 10 runner-ups) ===
Result	W/L	Date	Tournament	Surface	Partner	Opponents	Score
Loss	0–1	Jun 1967	French Open, France	Clay	(South Africa) Annette du Plooy	(France) Françoise Dürr (France) Gail Sherriff	2–6, 2–6
Loss	0–2	May 1968	Rome, Italy	Clay	(South Africa) Annette du Plooy	(Australia) Margaret Court (United Kingdom) Virginia Wade	2–6, 5–7
Loss	0–3	Jul 1970	Cincinnati, US	Clay	(Australia) Helen Gourlay	(United States) Rosie Casals (France) Gail Chanfreau	10–12, 1–6
Loss	0–4	Aug 1970	Toronto, Canada	Clay	(Australia) Helen Gourlay	(United States) Rosie Casals (Australia) Margaret Court	0–6, 1–6
Loss	0–5	Jun 1972	London (Queens), UK	Grass	(South Africa) Brenda Kirk	(United States) Rosie Casals (United States) Billie Jean King	7–5, 0–6, 2–6
Win	1–5	Jul 1972	Dublin, Ireland	Grass	(South Africa) Brenda Kirk	(Australia) Evonne Goolagong (Australia) Karen Krantzcke	6–3, 8–10, 6–2
Loss	1–6	Jul 1972	Hoylake, UK	Grass	(South Africa) Brenda Kirk	(Australia) Evonne Goolagong (Australia) Helen Gourlay	divided the prize because of rain
Loss	1–7	Aug 1972	Cincinnati, US	Clay	(South Africa) Brenda Kirk	(Australia) Margaret Court (Australia) Evonne Goolagong	4–6, 1–6
Loss	1–8	Aug 1972	Toronto, Canada	Clay	(South Africa) Brenda Kirk	(Australia) Margaret Court (Australia) Evonne Goolagong	6–3, 3–6, 5–7
Loss	1–9	Aug 1972	Haverford (Merion), US	Grass	(South Africa) Brenda Kirk	(United Kingdom) Virginia Wade (United States) Sharon Walsh	6–3, 3–6, 5–7
Win	2–9	Jul 1973	Cleveland, US	Hard	(South Africa) Ilana Kloss	(United States) Janice Metcalf (United States) Laurie Tenney	1–6, 7–6, 6–1
Loss	2–10	Aug 1973	Atlantic City, US		(South Africa) Ilana Kloss	(United States) Chris Evert (United States) Marita Redondo	4–6, 4–6
Win	3–10	Aug 1973	Cincinnati, US	Clay	(South Africa) Ilana Kloss	(Australia) Evonne Goolagong (Australia) Janet Young	7–6, 3–6, 6–2
