= Vlasta Vopičková =

Czech tennis player

- Full name: Vlasta Kodešová Vopičková
- Country (sports): Czechoslovakia
- Born: 26 March 1944 (age 81) Prague, Czechoslovakia

Singles

Grand Slam singles results
- French Open: QF (1968, 1970)
- Wimbledon: 4R (1970)

Doubles

Grand Slam doubles results
- French Open: 3R (1970)
- Wimbledon: QF (1964)

Vlasta Vopičková (born 26 March 1944) is a Czech former professional tennis player.

== Biography ==
She was born in 1944 as Vlasta Kodešová. Her younger brother is Jan Kodeš, who won three men's singles Grand Slam titles. After her marriage to Czech ice hockey player Milan Vopička in 1964, she became Vlasta Vopičková.

Vopičková made her Federation Cup debut for Czechoslovakia in 1964 and appeared in a total of nine ties. She had a 7-2 record in singles, which included a win over Virginia Wade in 1968.

At Grand Slams, she was most successful on the clay courts of Roland Garros, making the quarterfinals of the French Open in 1968 and 1970. She also competed at Wimbledon on several occasions and reached the round of 16 in the 1970 tournament.

She was a semifinalist at the 1973 Italian Open.
