= Annette Van Zyl =

South African tennis player

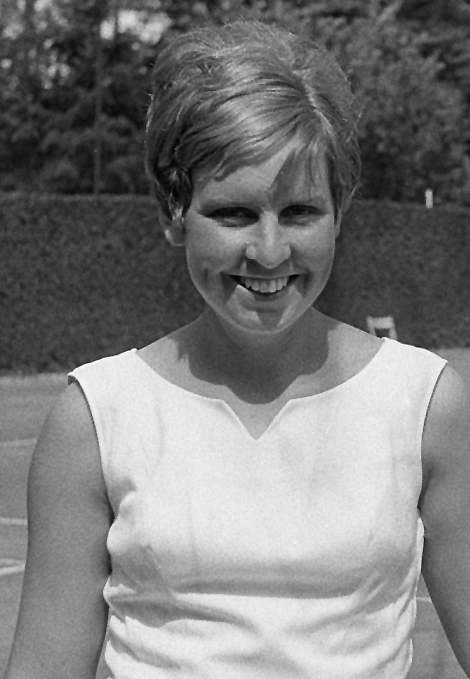
- Country (sports): South Africa
- Born: 25 September 1943 (age 82) Pretoria, South Africa
- Height: 1.80 m (5 ft 11 in)
- Plays: Right-handed

Singles
- Career record: no value
- Career titles: 11
- Highest ranking: No. 6 (1965, 1966)

Grand Slam singles results
- Australian Open: SF (1965)
- French Open: SF (1967, 1968)
- Wimbledon: QF (1966)
- US Open: QF (1967)

Doubles
- Career record: no value
- Career titles: 4

Grand Slam doubles results
- Australian Open: QF (1965)
- French Open: F (1967)
- Wimbledon: QF (1963)
- US Open: SF (1967)

Grand Slam mixed doubles results
- Australian Open: 3R (1965)
- French Open: W (1966)
- Wimbledon: SF (1966, 1967)

Annette Van Zyl (born 25 September 1943), also known by her married name as Annette du Plooy, is a South African former tennis player. She was ranked in the top ten female players during the mid-1960s, and in 1966 she won the French Open Mixed Doubles title with Frew McMillan, defeating Ann Haydon-Jones and Clark Graebner in three sets.

== Tennis career ==
In January 1965 she won the singles title at the Natal Championships in Durban. In April 1965 Van Zyl reached the final of the British Hard Court Championships at Bournemouth but was beaten in straight sets by Ann Haydon-Jones. In June of the same year, she won the singles title at the grass court tournament in Cheltenham, and later that month, she won the London Grass Court Championship played at the Queen's Club, defeating Christine Truman in the final. In July, she won the Welsh title also against Truman in the final. She reached the semifinal of the French Open singles in 1967, beating Billie Jean King in the quarterfinals and then losing to Lesley Turner Bowrey.

In July 1968, she won the singles title at the Swiss Open, defeating Julie Heldman in the final with the loss of just one game. In August she beat Judy Tegart in straight sets in the final of the singles event at the German Championships in Hamburg, also winning the doubles and mixed doubles events. Van Zyl reached the finals of the South African Championships singles event on three occasions, winning the title in 1963 and 1975 and ending as runner–up in 1965. From 1964 to 1976, she played in 11 ties for the South African Federation Cup team and compiled a 12–7 win-loss record.

According to A. Wallis Myers of The Daily Telegraph and the Daily Mail, Van Zyl was ranked in the world top 10 in 1965, 1966, and 1968, reaching a career high of world No. 6 in these rankings in 1965 and 1966.

== Tournament finals ==
=== Singles 13 (11 titles – 2 runner-ups) ===
Result	No.	Date	Tournament	Opponent	Score
Loss	1.	1965	British Hard Court Championships	(United Kingdom) Ann Haydon-Jones	5–7, 1–6
Loss	2.	1966	Italian Championships	(United Kingdom) Ann Haydon-Jones	6–8, 1–6
Win	1.	1965	London Championships	(United Kingdom) Christine Truman	6–3, 4–6, 6–4
Win	2.	Jun 1967	Swiss International Championships	(Australia) Jan Lehane O'Neill	6–1, 3–6, 6–3
Win	3.	Jan 1968	Natal Championships	(United States) Carole Graebner	6–1, 6–1
Win	4.	Jun 1968	Swiss International Championships	(West Germany) Helga Niessen	6–3, 6–3
Win	5.	Jul 1968	Gstaad International Championships	(United States) Julie Heldman	6–0, 6–1
Win	6.	Aug 1968	German Championships	(Australia) Judy Tegart	6–1, 7–5
Win	7.	Aug 1968	Kitzbühel Championships	(Hungary) Erzsébet Polgár	6–1, 6–0
Win	8.	Nov 1974	South Transvaal Championships	(South Africa) Brenda Kirk	6–3, 6–2
Win	9.	Nov 1975	South African Open	(South Africa) Brigitte Cuypers	6–3, 3–6, 6–4
Win	10.	Nov 1975	South Transvaal Championships	(South Africa) Yvonne Vermaak	6–3, 6–2
Win	11.	Nov 1977	South Transvaal Championships	(South Africa) Brenda Kirk	6–4, 0–6, 6–3

=== Doubles 7 (4 titles, 3 runner-ups) ===
Result	No.	Date	Tournament	Partner	Opponents	Score
Win	1.	1965	Rome, Italy	(Australia) Madonna Schacht	(Italy) Silvana Lazzarino (Italy) Lea Pericoli	2–6, 6–2, 12–10
Win	2.	1966	Rome, Italy	(Argentina) Norma Baylon	(United Kingdom) Ann Haydon-Jones (United Kingdom) Liz Starkie	6–3, 1–6, 6–2
Loss	3.	1967	French Open	(South Africa) Pat Walkden	(France) Françoise Dürr (France) Gail Sherriff	2–6, 2–6
Loss	4.	1968	Rome, Italy	(South Africa) Pat Walkden	(Australia) Margaret Court (United Kingdom) Virginia Wade	2–6, 5–7
Win	3.	1968	German Championships	(South Africa) Pat Walkden	(United Kingdom) Winnie Shaw (Australia) Judy Tegart	6–3, 7–5
Win	4.	Jun 1976	Beckenham, England	(South Africa) Brigitte Cuypers	(Soviet Union) Natasha Chmyreva (Soviet Union) Olga Morozova	9–7, 6–4
Loss	5.	Jul 1976	Gstaad, Switzerland	(South Africa) Brigitte Cuypers	(United States) Betsy Nagelsen (Australia) Wendy Turnbull	4–6, 4–6

=== Mixed doubles 1 ===
Result	No.	Date	Tournament	Partner	Opponents	Score
Win	1.	1966	French Championships	(South Africa) Frew McMillan	(United Kingdom) Ann Haydon-Jones (United States) Clark Graebner	1–6, 6–3, 6–2

== Personal life ==
On 20 April 1968, Van Zyl married Jan du Plooy in Pretoria. She is currently a head coach at the Brooklyn Union Tennis Club in Brooklyn, Pretoria, South Africa.
