= Eugenia Isopaitis =

Soviet tennis player

Eugenia Anatolyevna Isopaitis Евгения Анатольевна Изопайтис
- Country (sports): Soviet Union
- Born: 15 March 1950 (age 76)

Grand Slam singles results
- French Open: 1R (1968)
- Wimbledon: 1R (1970)

Grand Slam doubles results
- Wimbledon: 3R (1970)

Grand Slam mixed doubles results
- French Open: 1R (1968)
- Wimbledon: 3R (1970)

Eugenia Anatolyevna Isopaitis (Russian:Евгения Анатольевна Изопайтис 15 March 1950) is a former Soviet tennis player.

Isopaitis was a girls' singles finalist at the 1968 French Open, eventually losing to Australian Lesley Hunt.

She played in singles at the Wimbledon in 1970, where she lost to the British Veronica Burton in the first round. She and her partner in women's doubles Olga Morozova lost in the third round to American pair Rosie Casals and Billie Jean King. She and her partner in mixed doubles Vladimir Korotkov lost in the third round to Australian pair Ray Keldie and Kerry Harris.

== Career finals ==
=== Singles (1–3) ===
Result	No.	Year	location	Surface	Opponent	Score
Loss	1	January 1970	Leningrad, Soviet Union	Hard (i)	(Soviet Union) Marina Chuvirina	3–6, 2–6
Win	1.	April 1970	Minsk, Soviet Union	Hard (i)	(Soviet Union) Maria Kull	6–4, 6–3
Loss	2.	February 1971	Sievierodonetsk, Soviet Union	Hard (i)	(Soviet Union) Yelena Granaturova	4–6, 6–3, 2–6
Loss	3.	July 1973	Moscow, Soviet Union	Clay	(Soviet Union) Marina Chuvirina	8–6, 4–6, 2–6

=== Doubles (4–8) ===
Result	No.	Year	location	Surface	Partner	Opponents	Score
Loss	1.	September 1967	Tbilisi, Soviet Union	Clay	(Soviet Union) Rena Abzhandadze	(Soviet Union) Galina Baksheeva (Soviet Union) Aleksandra Ivanova	3–6, 5–7
Loss	2.	January 1970	Moscow, Soviet Union	Hard (i)	(Soviet Union) Rauza Islanova	(Soviet Union) Zaiga Jansone (Soviet Union) Olga Morozova	2–6, 2–6
Loss	3.	January 1970	Leningrad, Soviet Union	Hard (i)	(Soviet Union) Anna Yeremeyeva	(Soviet Union) Marina Chuvirina (Soviet Union) Yekaterina Kryuchkova	4–6, 4–6
Win	1.	April 1970	Minsk, Soviet Union	Hard (i)	(Soviet Union) Anna Yeremeyeva	(Soviet Union) Maria Kull (Soviet Union) Tiuu Parmas	6–4, 3–6, 6–2
Loss	4.	August 1970	Sofia, Bulgaria	Clay	(Soviet Union) Marina Kroschina	(Soviet Union) Tiiu Parmas (Soviet Union) Olga Morozova	2–6, 1–6
Win	2.	August 1970	Budapest, Hungary	Hard	(Socialist Federal Republic of Yugoslavia) Irena Škulj	(Hungary) Ágnes Graczol (Hungary) Éva Szabó	6–1, 6–3
Win	3.	February 1971	Sievierodonetsk, Soviet Union	Hard (i)	(Soviet Union) Rauza Islanova	(Soviet Union) Aleksandra Ivanova (Soviet Union) Anna Yeremeyeva	6–3, 6–4
Loss	5.	October 1972	Donetsk, Soviet Union	Hard (i)	(Soviet Union) Aleksandra Ivanova	(Soviet Union) Olga Morozova (Soviet Union) Zaiga Jansone	3–6, 3–6
Loss	6.	January 1973	Moscow, Soviet Union	Hard (i)	(Soviet Union) Olga Morozova	(Soviet Union) Galina Baksheeva (Soviet Union) Marina Chuvirina	3–6, 6–3, 3–6
Win	4.	March 1973	Moscow, Soviet Union	Hard (i)	(Soviet Union) Tiuu Parmas	(Soviet Union) Anna Yeremeyeva (Soviet Union) Lydia Zinkevich	3–6, 6–0, 6–1
Loss	7.	July 1973	Moscow, Soviet Union	Hard	(Soviet Union) Yelena Granaturova	(Soviet Union) Marina Chuvirina (Soviet Union) Tatiana Lagoiskaya	1–6, 6–3, 3–6
Loss	8.	February 1977	Salavat, Soviet Union	Hard (i)	(Soviet Union) Rauza Islanova	(Soviet Union) Eugenia Birioukova (Soviet Union) Olga Morozova	3–6, 4–6
