= 1971 Wimbledon Championships – Women's doubles =

Women's doubles
- 1971 Wimbledon Championships

Final
- Champions: (United States) Rosie Casals (United States) Billie Jean King
- Runners-up: (Australia) Margaret Court (Australia) Evonne Goolagong
- Score: 6–3, 6–2

Details
- Draw: 48 (3 Q )
- Seeds: 4

Events
Singles	men	women		boys	girls
Doubles	men	women	mixed	boys	girls
← 1970 ·	Wimbledon Championships	· 1972 →

Rosie Casals and Billie Jean King successfully defended their title, defeating Margaret Court and Evonne Goolagong in the final, 6–3, 6–2 to win the ladies' doubles tennis title at the 1971 Wimbledon Championships.

== Seeds ==
1. (United States) Rosie Casals / (United States) Billie Jean King (champions)
2. (Australia) Margaret Court / (Australia) Evonne Goolagong (final)
3. (Australia) Judy Dalton / (United Kingdom) Virginia Wade (third round)
4. (France) Gail Chanfreau / (France) Françoise Dürr (semifinals)

Click on the seed number of a player to go to their draw section.

== Draw ==
=== Key ===
- Q = Qualifier
- WC = Wild card
- LL = Lucky loser
- Alt = Alternate
- ITF = ITF entry
- PR = Protected ranking
- SR = Special ranking
- SE = Special exempt
- JE = Junior exempt
- JR = Junior Accelerator Programme entrant
- CO = College Accelerator Programme entrant
- NG = Next Gen Accelerator Program entrant
- w/o = Walkover
- r = Retired
- d = Defaulted

=== Finals ===
Quarterfinals
1	(United States) Rosie Casals (United States) Billie Jean King	6	6
(Indonesia) Lany Kaligis (Indonesia) Lita Liem	1	3
4	(France) Gail Chanfreau (France) Françoise Dürr	6	6
(West Germany) Helga Masthoff (West Germany) Heide Orth	4	3
(United States) Nancy Gunter (Australia) Kerry Melville
(United States) Mary-Ann Curtis (United States) Valerie Ziegenfuss	w/o
(United States) Patti Hogan (United Kingdom) Joyce Williams	2	2
2	(Australia) Margaret Court (Australia) Evonne Goolagong	6	6

Semifinals
1	(United States) Rosie Casals (United States) Billie Jean King	4	6	6
4	(France) Gail Chanfreau (France) Françoise Dürr	6	4	4
(United States) Mary-Ann Curtis (United States) Valerie Ziegenfuss	2	4
2	(Australia) Margaret Court (Australia) Evonne Goolagong	6	6

Final
1	(United States) Rosie Casals (United States) Billie Jean King	6	6
2	(Australia) Margaret Court (Australia) Evonne Goolagong	3	2

=== Top half ===
==== Section 1 ====
First round

Second round
1	(United States) R Casals (United States) BJ King	6	6
(United Kingdom) V Burton (United Kingdom) J Fayter	1	2
(United Kingdom) J Cooper (United Kingdom) C Molesworth	2	3
(United States) K Kemmer (United States) PA Reese	6	6
(Argentina) AM Arias (Argentina) R Giscafré	8	6
(West Germany) E Buding (Greece) C-A Kalogeropoulos	6	2
(Indonesia) L Kaligis (Indonesia) L Liem	3	6	6
Q	(United Kingdom) P Hardgrave (United Kingdom) D Riste	6	4	3

Third round
1	(United States) R Casals (United States) BJ King	6	6
(United States) K Kemmer (United States) PA Reese	0	3
(Argentina) AM Arias (Argentina) R Giscafré	4	3
(Indonesia) L Kaligis (Indonesia) L Liem	6	6

Quarterfinals
1	(United States) R Casals (United States) BJ King	6	6
(Indonesia) L Kaligis (Indonesia) L Liem	1	3

==== Section 2 ====
First round
4	(France) G Chanfreau (France) F Dürr	6	6
(United Kingdom) L Beaven (United Kingdom) S Brasher	0	4
(United States) P Teeguarden (United States) L Tuero	3	4
(United Kingdom) R Bentley (Australia) F Moore	6	6
(United Kingdom) W Shaw (Netherlands) B Stöve	6	5
(Australia) H Gourlay (Australia) K Harris	8	7
(Sweden) I Bentzer (Sweden) C Sandberg	7	3
(West Germany) K Ebbinghaus (Netherlands) G Walhof	9	6
(Soviet Union) M Kroschina (Hungary) É Szabó	8	7
(South Africa) D Botha (Ecuador) ME Guzmán	9	9
(South Africa) E Emmanuel (United States) C Martinez	6	6
(France) D Bouteleux (France) O de Roubin	4	3
(Spain) AM Estalella (Spain) C Mandarino	6	1	5
(Canada) J O'Hara (New Zealand) M Pryde	2	6	7
(West Germany) H Masthoff (West Germany) H Orth	6	6
(Netherlands) A Bakker (Netherlands) M Schaar	1	2

Second round
4	(France) G Chanfreau (France) F Dürr	6	8
(United Kingdom) R Bentley (Australia) F Moore	1	6
(Australia) H Gourlay (Australia) K Harris	4	6	6
(West Germany) K Ebbinghaus (Netherlands) G Walhof	6	3	3
(South Africa) D Botha (Ecuador) ME Guzmán	5	8
(South Africa) E Emmanuel (United States) C Martinez	7	9
(Canada) J O'Hara (New Zealand) M Pryde	6	2	3
(West Germany) H Masthoff (West Germany) H Orth	4	6	6

Third round
4	(France) G Chanfreau (France) F Dürr	3	8	6
(Australia) H Gourlay (Australia) K Harris	6	6	2
(South Africa) E Emmanuel (United States) C Martinez	2	4
(West Germany) H Masthoff (West Germany) H Orth	6	6

Quarterfinals
4	(France) G Chanfreau (France) F Dürr	6	6
(West Germany) H Masthoff (West Germany) H Orth	4	3

=== Bottom half ===
==== Section 3 ====
First round
(United States) N Gunter (Australia) K Melville	6	7
(Australia) L Bowrey (Australia) L Hunt	3	5
(United States) J Bartkowicz (United States) J Heldman	6	6
(United Kingdom) M Greenwood (United Kingdom) E James	3	2
(Australia) T Long (Australia) L Robinson	1	2
(Australia) P Faulkner (United Kingdom) S Holdsworth	6	6
(Uruguay) F Bonicelli (Colombia) I Fernández de Soto	9	6
(United States) J Newberry (United States) E Pande	8	3
(Soviet Union) Z Jansone (Soviet Union) O Morozova	6	7	9
(United Kingdom) C Janes (United Kingdom) E Truman	4	9	7
(United States) M-A Curtis (United States) V Ziegenfuss	6	6
Q	(Australia) JL Harris (Canada) A Martin	1	4
(Japan) J Sawamatsu (Japan) K Sawamatsu	1	6	3
(Italy) L Bassi (Italy) L Pericoli	6	4	6
Q	(United Kingdom) L Charles (United Kingdom) W Slaughter	2	2
3	(Australia) J Dalton (United Kingdom) V Wade	6	6

Second round
(United States) N Gunter (Australia) K Melville	8	4	6
(United States) J Bartkowicz (United States) J Heldman	6	6	3
(Australia) P Faulkner (United Kingdom) S Holdsworth	1	3
(Uruguay) F Bonicelli (Colombia) I Fernández de Soto	6	6
(Soviet Union) Z Jansone (Soviet Union) O Morozova	6	6	5
(United States) M-A Curtis (United States) V Ziegenfuss	4	8	7
(Italy) L Bassi (Italy) L Pericoli	3	4
3	(Australia) J Dalton (United Kingdom) V Wade	6	6

Third round
(United States) N Gunter (Australia) K Melville	6	8
(Uruguay) F Bonicelli (Colombia) I Fernández de Soto	2	6
(United States) M-A Curtis (United States) V Ziegenfuss	4	6	6
3	(Australia) J Dalton (United Kingdom) V Wade	6	2	3

Quarterfinals
(United States) N Gunter (Australia) K Melville
(United States) M-A Curtis (United States) V Ziegenfuss	w/o

==== Section 4 ====
First round

Second round
(United States) D Carter-Triolo (United States) K Pigeon	6	8
(Czechoslovakia) M Holubová (Czechoslovakia) M Neumannová	1	6
(United States) P Hogan (United Kingdom) J Williams	6	7	6
(Australia) B Hawcroft (United Kingdom) J Wainwright	1	9	2
(South Africa) B Kirk (South Africa) L Rossouw	6	6
(United States) S Grant (United States) G Hansen	2	0
(United States) T Fretz (Australia) W Gilchrist	6	2	1
2	(Australia) M Court (Australia) E Goolagong	4	6	6

Third round
(United States) D Carter-Triolo (United States) K Pigeon	3	3
(United States) P Hogan (United Kingdom) J Williams	6	6
(South Africa) B Kirk (South Africa) L Rossouw	3	0
2	(Australia) M Court (Australia) E Goolagong	6	6

Quarterfinals
(United States) P Hogan (United Kingdom) J Williams	2	2
2	(Australia) M Court (Australia) E Goolagong	6	6
