= USSR All-Union Championships =

USSR All-Union Championships USSR All-Union Winter Championships

Defunct tennis tournament
- Event name: All-Union Winter Championships
- Tour: ILTF World Circuit (1968–75)
- Founded: 1968; 58 years ago
- Abolished: 1975; 51 years ago
- Location: Baku; Dneprodzerzhinsk; Kiev; Leningrad; Salavat; Severodonetsk
- Venue: Various
- Surface: Wood (indoors); Carpet (indoors)

The U.S.S.R. All-Union Championships also known as the All-Union Championships or the All-Union Winter Championships was a men's and women's indoor closed tennis tournament founded in 1968 and usually played in late January early February annually. It was played on wood courts, then later carpet courts tennis tournament founded in 1968 and usually played in February. It was organised by the Tennis Federation of the USSR until 1975 when it was discontinued.

== History ==
On 5 February 1968 the U.S.S.R. All-Union Championships indoor tennis tournament was first held in Kiev in the Soviet Union. The championships were a closed tennis tournament open only to Soviet tennis players. The winners of the inaugural singles titles were Alexander Metreveli (men) and Galina Baksheeva. The championships were also played in other locations including Baku, Dneprodzerzhinsk, Kiev, Leningrad, Salavat and Severodonetsk. was organised by the Tennis Federation of the USSR until 1975 when it was discontinued.

== Finals ==
=== Men's singles ===
Year	Location	Champion	Runner up	Score
1968	Leningrad	(Soviet Union) Alexander Metreveli	(Soviet Union) Tomas Lejus	6–3, 6–4, 3–6, 6–3 .
↓ Open era ↓
1969	Leningrad	(Soviet Union) Alexander Metreveli (2)	(Soviet Union) Vladimir Korotkov	6–3, 3–6, 4–6, 9–7, 6–3 .
1970	Kiev	(Soviet Union) Alexander Metreveli (3)	(Soviet Union) Sergei Likhachev	2–6, 6–4, 8–6, 12–10 .
1971	Severodonetsk	(Soviet Union) Anatoli Volkov	(Soviet Union) Peeter Lamp	6–4, 6–1, 6–3 .
1972	Kiev	(Soviet Union) Tomas Lejus	(Soviet Union) Peeter Lamp	3–6, 6–1, 6–4, 7–5 .
1973	Baku	(Soviet Union) Sergei Likhachev	(Soviet Union) Aleksandr M. Ivanov	6–2, 3–6, 6–4, 6–1 .
1974	Salavat	(Soviet Union) Teimuraz Kakulia	(Soviet Union) Vladimir Korotkov	6–3, 6–2, 8–6 .
1975	Dneprodzerzhinsk	(Soviet Union) Konstantin Pugaev	(Soviet Union) Anatoli Volkov	6–2, 7–5, 6–4 .

=== Women's singles ===
Year	Location	Champion	Runner up	Score
1968	Leningrad	(Soviet Union) Galina Baksheeva	(Soviet Union) Olga Morozova	6–3, 1–6, 6–2
↓ Open era ↓
1969	Leningrad	(Soviet Union) Olga Morozova	(Soviet Union) Galina Baksheeva	6–2, 4–6 6–3
1970	Kiev	(Soviet Union) Olga Morozova (2)	(Soviet Union) Anna Yeremeyeva	6–4, 6–3
1971	Severodonetsk	(Soviet Union) Yelena Granaturova	(Soviet Union) Yevgenyia Izopaitis	6–4, 3–6, 6–2
1972	Kiev	(Soviet Union) Marina Chuvirina	(Soviet Union) Marina Kroshina	61, 6–4
1973	Baku	(Soviet Union) Olga Morozova (3)	(Soviet Union) Marina Kroshina	6–1, 6–2
1974	Salavat	(Soviet Union) Olga Morozova (4)	(Soviet Union) Yelena Granaturova	6–4, 4–6, 6–2
1975	Dneprodzerzhinsk	(Soviet Union) Marina Kroshina	(Soviet Union) Yelena Granaturova	6–4, 3–6, 9–7
