= Marina Chuvirina =

Soviet tennis player

Marina Viktorovna Chuvirina Марина Викторовна Чувырина
- Country (sports): Soviet Union
- Born: 10 July 1947 (age 77)
- Plays: Right-handed

Singles

Grand Slam singles results
- French Open: 1R (1972)
- Wimbledon: 2R (1969)

Doubles

Grand Slam doubles results
- French Open: 1R 1972)

Grand Slam mixed doubles results
- French Open: 1R (1972)
- Wimbledon: 3R (1969)

Marina Viktorovna Chuvirina (Russian: Марина Викторовна Чувырина 10 July 1947) is a former Soviet tennis player.

She played in singles at the Wimbledon in 1969. She did not play in the first round. She lost to the American player Kristy Pigeon in the second round. Her partner in mixed doubles Vladimir Korotkov lost in the Third Round to the Australian player Ray Ruffels and Karen Krantzcke.

She played in singles at the French Open in 1972. She lost to the Dutch player Gertruida Walhof in the first round. Her partner in women's doubles, West German Kora Schediwy lost in the first round to the American player Rosie Casals and the British player Virginia Wade. Her partner in mixed doubles, Teimuraz Kakulia lost in the first Round to the Australian player Bob Howe and the French player Rosy Darmon.

== Career finals ==
=== Singles (6–6) ===
| Result | No. | Year | location | Surface | Opponent | Score |
|---|---|---|---|---|---|---|
| Loss | 1 | August 1968 | Moscow, Soviet Union | Hard | (Soviet Union) Olga Morozova | 1–6, 3–6 |
| Loss | 2. | February 1969 | Moscow, Soviet Union | Hard (i) | (Soviet Union) Olga Morozova | 1–6, 0–6 |
| Loss | 3. | August 1969 | Budapest, Hungary | Clay | (Australia) Helen Gourlay | 4–6, 4–6 |
| Win | 1. | January 1970 | Leningrad, Soviet Union | Hard (i) | (Soviet Union) Eugenia Isopaitis | 6–3, 6–2 |
| Loss | 4. | January 1970 | Moscow, Soviet Union | Hard (i) | (Soviet Union) Olga Morozova | 3–6, 2–6 |
| Loss | 5. | January 1972 | Minsk, Soviet Union | Hard (i) | (Soviet Union) Anna Dmitrieva | 4–6, 2–6 |
| Win | 2. | February 1972 | Kyiv, Soviet Union | Hard | (Soviet Union) Marina Kroschina | 6–1, 6–4 |
| Win | 3. | January 1973 | Moscow, Soviet Union | Hard | (Soviet Union) Galina Baksheeva | 6–3, 6–1 |
| Loss | 6. | January 1973 | Tallinn, Soviet Union | Hard (i) | (Soviet Union) Lydia Zinkevich | 5–7, 6–7 |
| Win | 4. | March 1973 | Cairo, Egypt | Clay | (Italy) Lea Pericoli | 2–6, 8–6, 3–4 ret. |
| Win | 5. | July 1973 | Moscow, Soviet Union | Hard | (Soviet Union) Eugenia Isopaitis | 6–8, 6–4, 6–2 |
| Win | 6. | March 1974 | Alexandria, Egypt | Hard | (Czechoslovakia) Marie Neumannová | 6–3, 5–7, 6–4 |

=== Doubles (10–6) ===
| Result | No. | Year | location | Surface | Partner | Opponents | Score |
|---|---|---|---|---|---|---|---|
| Win | 1. | August 1968 | Moscow, Soviet Union | Hard | (Soviet Union) Olga Morozova | (Australia) Kerry Harris (Australia) Lesley Hunt | 6–0, 6–4 |
| Win | 2. | February 1969 | Moscow, Soviet Union | Hard (i) | (Soviet Union) Yekaterina Kryuchkova | (Soviet Union) Maria Kull (Soviet Union) Larissa Preobrazhenskaya | 6–3, 6–3 |
| Loss | 1. | August 1969 | Moscow, Soviet Union | Clay | (Soviet Union) Galina Baksheeva | (Soviet Union) Olga Morozova (Soviet Union) Zaiga Jansone | 3–6, 2–6 |
| Loss | 2. | August 1969 | Budapest, Hungary | Clay | (Hungary) Katalin Borka | (Australia) Helen Amos (Australia) Helen Gourlay | 2–6, 4–6 |
| Loss | 3. | September 1969 | Turin, Italy | Clay | (Soviet Union) Tiiu Parmas | (Soviet Union) Olga Morozova (Soviet Union) Zaiga Yansone | 1–6, 6–3, 4–6 |
| Win | 3. | January 1970 | Leningrad, Soviet Union | Hard (i) | (Soviet Union) Yekaterina Kryuchkova | (Soviet Union) Eugenia Isopaitis (Soviet Union) Anna Yeremeyeva | 6–4, 6–4 |
| Win | 4. | January 1972 | Minsk, Soviet Union | Hard (i) | (Soviet Union) Anna Dmitrieva | (Soviet Union) Larisa Novoshinskaya (Soviet Union) Anna Yeremeyeva | 6–3, 3–6, 6–1 |
| Win | 5. | February 1972 | Kyiv, Soviet Union | Hard (i) | (Soviet Union) Galina Baksheeva | (Soviet Union) Eugenia Birioukova (Soviet Union) Marina Kroschina | 6–3, 5–7, 6–4 |
| Win | 6. | January 1973 | Moscow, Soviet Union | Hard | (Soviet Union) Galina Baksheeva | (Soviet Union) Eugenia Isopaitis (Soviet Union) Olga Morozova | 6–3, 3–6, 6–3 |
| Win | 7. | January 1973 | Tallinn, Soviet Union | Hard (i) | (Soviet Union) Olga Morozova | (Soviet Union) Eugenia Birioukova (Soviet Union) Anna Yeremeyeva | 6–0, 7–5 |
| Loss | 4. | February 1973 | Baku, Soviet Union | Hard | (Soviet Union) Galina Baksheeva | (Soviet Union) Olga Morozova (Soviet Union) Zaiga Yansone | 3–6, 1–6 |
| Loss | 5. | March 1973 | Cairo, Egypt | Clay | (Soviet Union) Lydia Zinkevich | (Soviet Union) Elena Komarova (Soviet Union) Tiiu Parmas | 3–6, 6–4, 1–6 |
| Win | 8. | July 1973 | Moscow, Soviet Union | Hard | (Soviet Union) Tatiana Lagoiskaya | (Soviet Union) Yelena Granaturova (Soviet Union) Eugenia Isopaitis | 6–1, 3–6, 6–3 |
| Win | 9. | February 1974 | Moscow, Soviet Union | Clay | (Soviet Union) Galina Baksheeva | (Soviet Union) Eugenia Birioukova (Soviet Union) Olga Morozova | 7–5, 6–1 |
| Loss | 6. | July 1975 | Tallinn, Soviet Union | Hard (i) | (Soviet Union) Natasha Chmyreva | (Soviet Union) Marina Kroschina (Soviet Union) Olga Morozova | 1–6, 2–6 |
| Win | 10. | August 1976 | Přerov, Czechoslovakia | Clay | (Soviet Union) Olga Morozova | (Soviet Union) Galina Baksheeva (Soviet Union) Natasha Chmyreva | 6–4, 6–4 |
