= 1972 Wimbledon Championships – Women's singles =

Women's singles
- 1972 Wimbledon Championships

Final
- Champion: (United States) Billie Jean King
- Runner-up: (Australia) Evonne Goolagong
- Score: 6–3, 6–3

Details
- Draw: 96 (7 Q )
- Seeds: 8

Events
Singles	men	women		boys	girls
Doubles	men	women	mixed	boys	girls
← 1971 ·	Wimbledon Championships	· 1973 →

Billie Jean King defeated defending champion Evonne Goolagong in the final, 6–3, 6–3 to win the ladies' singles tennis title at the 1972 Wimbledon Championships. It was her fourth Wimbledon singles title and eighth major singles title overall.

This marked the first Wimbledon appearance for future three-time champion, seven-time runner-up, and world No. 1 Chris Evert; she lost to Goolagong in the semifinals.

== Seeds ==
1. (Australia) Evonne Goolagong (final)
2. (United States) Billie Jean King (champion)
3. (United States) Nancy Richey (quarterfinals)
4. (United States) Chris Evert (semifinals)
5. (Australia) Kerry Melville (third round)
6. (United States) Rosie Casals (semifinals)
7. (United Kingdom) Virginia Wade (quarterfinals)
8. (France) Françoise Dürr (quarterfinals)

Click on the seed number of a player to go to their draw section.

== Draw ==
=== Key ===
- Q = Qualifier
- WC = Wild card
- LL = Lucky loser
- Alt = Alternate
- ITF = ITF entry
- PR = Protected ranking
- SR = Special ranking
- SE = Special exempt
- JE = Junior exempt
- JR = Junior Accelerator Programme entrant
- CO = College Accelerator Programme entrant
- NG = Next Gen Accelerator Program entrant
- w/o = Walkover
- r = Retired
- d = Defaulted

=== Finals ===
Quarterfinals
1	(Australia) Evonne Goolagong	8	7
8	(France) Françoise Dürr	6	5
4	(United States) Chris Evert	6	4	6
(United States) Patti Hogan	2	6	1
6	(United States) Rosie Casals	3	6	6
3	(United States) Nancy Richey	6	4	0
7	(United Kingdom) Virginia Wade	1	6	3
2	(United States) Billie Jean King	6	3	6

Semifinals
1	(Australia) Evonne Goolagong	4	6	6
4	(United States) Chris Evert	6	3	4
6	(United States) Rosie Casals	2	4
2	(United States) Billie Jean King	6	6

Final
1	(Australia) Evonne Goolagong	3	3
2	(United States) Billie Jean King	6	6

=== Top half ===
==== Section 1 ====
First round

Second round
1	(Australia) E Goolagong	6	6
(New Zealand) M Pryde	3	4
(United States) S Stap	6	5	6
(Netherlands) A Bakker	0	7	1
(Uruguay) F Bonicelli	5	5
(Soviet Union) O Morozova	7	7
(West Germany) C Schediwy	1	4
(United States) W Overton	6	6

Third round
1	(Australia) E Goolagong	6	6
(United States) S Stap	2	0
(Soviet Union) O Morozova	6	6
(United States) W Overton	4	1

Fourth round
1	(Australia) E Goolagong	3	6	9
(Soviet Union) O Morozova	6	0	7

==== Section 2 ====
First round

Second round
8	(France) F Dürr	6	6
(South Africa) E Emmanuel	1	1
(Colombia) I Fernández de Soto	2	4
(United Kingdom) E Truman	6	6
(United Kingdom) J Williams	9	6	2
(United States) L duPont	7	8	6
(United States) M Schallau	4	6	1
(Soviet Union) M Kroschina	6	2	6

Third round
8	(France) F Dürr	6	6
(United Kingdom) E Truman	0	1
(United States) L duPont	9	6
(Soviet Union) M Kroschina	8	4

Fourth round
8	(France) F Dürr	6	6
(United States) L duPont	1	2

==== Section 3 ====
First round
4	(United States) C Evert	1	6	6
(United States) V Ziegenfuss	6	3	3
(United States) J Newberry	6	6
(West Germany) K Ebbinghaus	3	1
(United Kingdom) S Brasher	6	9
(United States) C Graebner	1	8
Q	(Belgium) M Gurdal	2	4
(United States) M-A Eisel	6	6
(France) O de Roubin	1	6	0
Q	(United States) J Anthony	6	3	6
(United Kingdom) L Beaven	6	2	4
(United Kingdom) V Burton	2	6	6
(United Kingdom) J Cooper	6	6
(Australia) P Faulkner	0	3
(Czechoslovakia) V Vopičková	6	6
Q	(United States) T O'Shaughnessy	1	2

Second round
4	(United States) C Evert	6	6
(United States) J Newberry	3	0
(United Kingdom) S Brasher	2	6	3
(United States) M-A Eisel	6	4	6
(United States) J Anthony	7	2	6
(United Kingdom) V Burton	5	6	2
(United Kingdom) J Cooper	6	6
(Czechoslovakia) V Vopičková	3	2

Third round
4	(United States) C Evert	8	8
(United States) M-A Eisel	6	6
(United States) J Anthony	6	6
(United Kingdom) J Cooper	1	2

Fourth round
4	(United States) C Evert	6	6
(United States) J Anthony	3	2

==== Section 4 ====
First round
5	(Australia) K Melville	6	6
(Canada) V Berner	2	2
(Austria) S Pachta	6	3	7
Q	(United Kingdom) S Mappin	3	6	5
(United Kingdom) J Fayter	1	3
(United States) L Tuero	6	6
Q	(United States) W Appleby	4	6
(United States) P Hogan	6	8
(South Africa) L Rossouw	7	6
(France) G Chanfreau	5	0
(United Kingdom) G Coles	3	6	3
(South Africa) D Pattison	6	4	6
Q	(United Kingdom) D Riste	4	2
(Argentina) R Giscafré	6	6
(United Kingdom) C Molesworth	8	1
(United States) P Teeguarden	9	6

Second round
5	(Australia) K Melville	6	9
(Austria) S Pachta	0	7
(United States) L Tuero	1	4
(United States) P Hogan	6	6
(South Africa) L Rossouw	4	6	7
(South Africa) D Pattison	6	3	5
(Argentina) R Giscafré	0	0^{r}
(United States) P Teeguarden	6	1

Third round
5	(Australia) K Melville	4	4
(United States) P Hogan	6	6
(South Africa) L Rossouw	2	2
(United States) P Teeguarden	6	6

Fourth round
(United States) P Hogan	6	6
(United States) P Teeguarden	3	4

=== Bottom half ===
==== Section 5 ====
First round
(Netherlands) G Walhof	6	6
(Czechoslovakia) A Palmeová-West	3	1
(Australia) W Gilchrist	4	6	6
(United States) K Pigeon	6	4	3
(Australia) L Hunt	7	6
(South Africa) B Kirk	5	4
(Netherlands) B Stöve	6	6
(Italy) L Bassi	3	0
(Republic of Ireland) S Minford	4	4
(Australia) B Hawcroft	6	6
(Ecuador) ME Guzmán	4	1
(Soviet Union) E Birioukova	6	6
(Rhodesia) S Hudson-Beck	4	6	4
(Australia) C Doerner	6	3	6
(Indonesia) L Kaligis	4	3
6	(United States) R Casals	6	6

Second round
(Netherlands) G Walhof	6	6
(Australia) W Gilchrist	3	4
(Australia) L Hunt	7	5	2
(Netherlands) B Stöve	5	7	6
(Australia) B Hawcroft	6	2	6
(Soviet Union) E Birioukova	3	6	4
(Australia) C Doerner	2	8	0
6	(United States) R Casals	6	6	6

Third round
(Netherlands) G Walhof	2	8
(Netherlands) B Stöve	6	9
(Australia) B Hawcroft	0	1
6	(United States) R Casals	6	6

Fourth round
(Netherlands) B Stöve	3	2
6	(United States) R Casals	6	6

==== Section 6 ====
First round
(United Kingdom) L Charles	6	6
(France) N Fuchs	2	3
(Netherlands) M Schaar	5	9	3
(Indonesia) L Liem	7	7	6
(United Kingdom) A Cowie	6	6
(United States) D Carter-Triolo	2	2
(Australia) K Harris	8	3	7
(United States) K Kemmer	6	6	5
(Chile) AM Pinto Bravo	5	3
(Australia) H Amos	7	6
(South Africa) P Pretorius	6	6
(Australia) W Turnbull	0	3
(Sweden) C Sandberg	6	6
(Czechoslovakia) M Neumannová	4	2
(Australia) V Lancaster	2	1
3	(United States) N Richey	6	6

Second round
(United Kingdom) L Charles	5	6	5
(Indonesia) L Liem	7	4	7
(United Kingdom) A Cowie	6	2
(Australia) K Harris	8	6
(Australia) H Amos	1	2
(South Africa) P Pretorius	6	6
(Sweden) C Sandberg	7	1	2
3	(United States) N Richey	5	6	6

Third round
(Indonesia) L Liem	6	2	2
(Australia) K Harris	3	6	6
(South Africa) P Pretorius	2	6	2
3	(United States) N Richey	6	4	6

Fourth round
(Australia) K Harris	3	5
3	(United States) N Richey	6	7

==== Section 7 ====
First round

Second round
(Australia) J Dalton	6	7	9
(Japan) K Sawamatsu	3	9	7
Q	(United States) K Blake	5	4
(Australia) H Gourlay	7	6
(Australia) P Coleman	3	3
(Sweden) I Bentzer	6	6
(Australia) K Krantzcke	8	2	3
7	(United Kingdom) V Wade	6	6	6

Third round
(Australia) J Dalton	5	3
(Australia) H Gourlay	7	6
(Sweden) I Bentzer	1	1
7	(United Kingdom) V Wade	6	6

Fourth round
(Australia) H Gourlay	3	2
7	(United Kingdom) V Wade	6	6

==== Section 8 ====
First round

Second round
(United Kingdom) W Shaw	6	6
(West Germany) H Masthoff	3	2
(United States) M Louie	7	4	10
(United States) J Heldman	5	6	8
(United States) N Ornstein	5	3
(United States) C Martinez	7	6
(United States) S Walsh	2	0
2	(United States) BJ King	6	6

Third round
(United Kingdom) W Shaw	6	6
(United States) M Louie	2	2
(United States) C Martinez	1	3
2	(United States) BJ King	6	6

Fourth round
(United Kingdom) W Shaw	4	2
2	(United States) BJ King	6	6

Preceded by 1972 French Open – Women's singles	Grand Slam women's singles	Succeeded by 1972 US Open – Women's singles
