= 1971 Wimbledon Championships – Women's singles =

Women's singles
- 1971 Wimbledon Championships

Final
- Champion: (Australia) Evonne Goolagong
- Runner-up: (Australia) Margaret Court
- Score: 6–4, 6–1

Details
- Draw: 96 (7Q)
- Seeds: 8

Events
Singles	men	women		boys	girls
Doubles	men	women	mixed	boys	girls
- Wimbledon Championships

Evonne Goolagong defeated defending champion Margaret Court in the final, 6–4, 6–1 to win the ladies' singles tennis title at the 1971 Wimbledon Championships. It was her second major singles title, completing the Channel Slam. The final was the first and only all Australian final contested in the ladies' singles. Australian players took four of the eight places in the quarter finals and three of the four in the semifinals.

When Lea Pericoli beat Ingrid Bentzer in the first round, when the score reached 8-8 in the second set, they contested the first ever tie-break played at Wimbledon in the women's event.

== Seeds ==
1. (Australia) Margaret Court (final)
2. (United States) Billie Jean King (semifinals)
3. (Australia) Evonne Goolagong (champion)
4. (United States) Rosie Casals (second round)
5. (United Kingdom) Virginia Wade (fourth round)
6. (United States) Nancy Richey (quarterfinals)
7. (France) Françoise Dürr (quarterfinals)
8. (West Germany) Helga Masthoff (third round)

Click on the seed number of a player to go to their draw section.

== Draw ==
Key

- Q = Qualifier
- WC = Wild card
- LL = Lucky loser
- Alt = Alternate
- ITF = ITF entry
- PR = Protected ranking
- SR = Special ranking
- SE = Special exempt
- JE = Junior exempt
- JR = Junior Accelerator Programme entrant
- CO = College Accelerator Programme entrant
- NG = Next Gen Accelerator Program entrant
- w/o = Walkover
- r = Retired
- d = Defaulted

=== Finals ===
Quarterfinals
1	(Australia) Margaret Court	6	6
(United Kingdom) Winnie Shaw	2	1
(Australia) Kerry Melville	2	6	3
(Australia) Judy Dalton	6	3	6
6	(United States) Nancy Richey	3	2
3	(Australia) Evonne Goolagong	6	6
7	(France) Françoise Dürr	6	2	2
2	(United States) Billie Jean King	2	6	6

Semifinals
1	(Australia) Margaret Court	4	6	6
(Australia) Judy Dalton	6	1	0
3	(Australia) Evonne Goolagong	6	6
2	(United States) Billie Jean King	4	4

Final
1	(Australia) Margaret Court	4	1
3	(Australia) Evonne Goolagong	6	6

=== Top half ===
==== Section 1 ====
First round

Second round
1	(Australia) M Court	6	6
(Australia) L Robinson	0	0
(Republic of Ireland) S Minford	2	5
(United States) C Martinez	6	7
(Netherlands) M Schaar	7	6
(United Kingdom) S Brasher	5	3
(United Kingdom) R Bentley	6	6
(United Kingdom) S Holdsworth	3	3

Third round
1	(Australia) M Court	6	6
(United States) C Martinez	1	1
(Netherlands) M Schaar	3	6	6
(United Kingdom) R Bentley	6	1	2

Fourth round
1	(Australia) M Court	6	6
(Netherlands) M Schaar	2	1

==== Section 2 ====
First round

Second round
8	(West Germany) H Masthoff	1	6	6
(France) G Chanfreau	6	2	4
Q	(United States) R Vest	1	1
(Australia) L Bowrey	6	6
(Colombia) I Fernández de Soto	4	2
(United Kingdom) W Shaw	6	6
(United States) E Pande	6	1	6
(Netherlands) G Walhof	3	6	0

Third round
8	(West Germany) H Masthoff	6	1
(Australia) L Bowrey	8	6
(United Kingdom) W Shaw	6	6
(United States) E Pande	4	1

Fourth round
(Australia) L Bowrey	6	7	3
(United Kingdom) W Shaw	1	9	6

==== Section 3 ====
First round
4	(United States) R Casals	6	6
(France) R Darmon	0	0
(Australia) K Melville	6	6
(Australia) H Gourlay	3	2
(South Africa) B Kirk	6	6
Q	(Australia) A Coleman	2	2
(Netherlands) B Stöve	6	6
(Canada) A Martin	1	1
(Australia) H Amos	3	3
(West Germany) K Ebbinghaus	6	6
(Argentina) R Giscafré	4	2
(Sweden) C Sandberg	6	6
(West Germany) H Orth	0	6	1
(United Kingdom) J Cooper	6	4	6
(Argentina) AM Arias	2	3
(United States) M-A Curtis	6	6

Second round
4	(United States) R Casals	5	4
(Australia) K Melville	7	6
(South Africa) B Kirk	6	6	6
(Netherlands) B Stöve	4	8	3
(West Germany) K Ebbinghaus	6	0	5
(Sweden) C Sandberg	4	6	7
(United Kingdom) J Cooper	1	3
(United States) M-A Curtis	6	6

Third round
(Australia) K Melville	9	6
(South Africa) B Kirk	8	1
(Sweden) C Sandberg	6	4
(United States) M-A Curtis	8	6

Fourth round
(Australia) K Melville	6	3	6
(United States) M-A Curtis	1	6	1

==== Section 4 ====
First round
5	(United Kingdom) V Wade	7	6
(United States) P Hogan	5	2
(United Kingdom) M Greenwood	6	5	6
(France) O de Roubin	3	7	4
(South Africa) L Rossouw	9	6
(United States) T Fretz	7	4
(United States) D Carter-Triolo	6	6	6
(New Zealand) M Pryde	8	4	3
(Italy) A-M Nasuelli	w/o
(United States) V Ziegenfuss
(United Kingdom) J Williams	7	4
(Australia) J Dalton	9	6
(South Africa) E Emmanuel	0	3
(Soviet Union) O Morozova	6	6
(Sweden) I Bentzer	7	8	4
(Italy) L Pericoli	5	9	6

Second round
5	(United Kingdom) V Wade	6	6
(United Kingdom) M Greenwood	1	4
(South Africa) L Rossouw	8	3
(United States) D Carter-Triolo	9	6
(United States) V Ziegenfuss	4	4
(Australia) J Dalton	6	6
(Soviet Union) O Morozova	6	6
(Italy) L Pericoli	3	3

Third round
5	(United Kingdom) V Wade	6	6
(United States) D Carter-Triolo	1	1
(Australia) J Dalton	6	7
(Soviet Union) O Morozova	3	5

Fourth round
5	(United Kingdom) V Wade	8	3
(Australia) J Dalton	9	6

=== Bottom half ===
==== Section 5 ====
First round
(United Kingdom) V Burton	2	3
(United Kingdom) E Truman	6	6
(Uruguay) F Bonicelli	3	3
(Soviet Union) Z Jansone	6	6
(Chile) M Rodríguez	4	3
(Australia) S Alexander	6	6
Q	(Rhodesia) S Hudson-Beck	2	2
(Australia) B Hawcroft	6	6
Q	(United Kingdom) G Coles	2	6
(United States) J Newberry	6	8
Q	(Australia) V Lancaster	0	3
(Japan) K Sawamatsu	6	6
(Indonesia) L Kaligis	2	6	4
Q	(United States) PA Reese	6	3	6
(Indonesia) L Liem	2	1
6	(United States) N Richey	6	6

Second round
(United Kingdom) E Truman	6	5	5
(Soviet Union) Z Jansone	1	7	7
(Australia) S Alexander	7	3	0
(Australia) B Hawcroft	5	6	6
(United States) J Newberry	2	8	4
(Japan) K Sawamatsu	6	6	6
Q	(United States) PA Reese	0	1
6	(United States) N Richey	6	6

Third round
(Soviet Union) Z Jansone	6	1	6
(Australia) B Hawcroft	4	6	4
(Japan) K Sawamatsu	2	2
6	(United States) N Richey	6	6

Fourth round
(Soviet Union) Z Jansone	3	2
6	(United States) N Richey	6	6

==== Section 6 ====
First round
(United Kingdom) J Fayter	5	6	6
(United Kingdom) C Molesworth	7	2	3
(Canada) J O'Hara	2	2
(United States) L Tuero	6	6
(United Kingdom) J Wainwright	6	3	5
(Australia) L Hunt	4	6	7
(Australia) K Harris	6	6
(Finland) B Lindström	1	0
(Czechoslovakia) M Neumannová	4	4
Q	(South Africa) D Botha	6	6
(United States) J Heldman	4	6	6
(United States) K Pigeon	6	2	2
(United States) J Bartkowicz	5	0
(United States) K Kemmer	7	6
(United States) G Hansen	0	2
3	(Australia) E Goolagong	6	6

Second round
(United Kingdom) J Fayter	1	3
(United States) L Tuero	6	6
(Australia) L Hunt	9	6
(Australia) K Harris	8	2
Q	(South Africa) D Botha	1	0
(United States) J Heldman	6	6
(United States) K Kemmer	4	1
3	(Australia) E Goolagong	6	6

Third round
(United States) L Tuero	1	2
(Australia) L Hunt	6	6
(United States) J Heldman	3	3
3	(Australia) E Goolagong	6	6

Fourth round
(Australia) L Hunt	6	2	1
3	(Australia) E Goolagong	1	6	6

==== Section 7 ====
First round

Second round
(United Kingdom) E James	6	2
(Czechoslovakia) A Palmeová-West	8	6
(Australia) P Faulkner	2	2
(United Kingdom) L Beaven	6	6
(Netherlands) A Bakker	2	6	6
(Soviet Union) M Kroschina	6	2	1
(Czechoslovakia) M Holubová	2	4
7	(France) F Dürr	6	6

Third round
(Czechoslovakia) A Palmeová-West	4	1
(United Kingdom) L Beaven	6	6
(Netherlands) A Bakker	0	1
7	(France) F Dürr	6	6

Fourth round
(United Kingdom) L Beaven	8	1	1
7	(France) F Dürr	6	6	6

==== Section 8 ====
First round

Second round
(United Kingdom) C Janes	6	6
(Australia) F Moore	1	4
(United Kingdom) A Cowie	1	5
(United States) P Teeguarden	6	7
(France) D Bouteleux	2	6	8
(Ecuador) ME Guzmán	6	1	6
(Australia) W Gilchrist	6	1	0
2	(United States) BJ King	4	6	6

Third round
(United Kingdom) C Janes	6	6
(United States) P Teeguarden	2	3
(France) D Bouteleux	2	0
2	(United States) BJ King	6	6

Fourth round
(United Kingdom) C Janes	2	5
2	(United States) BJ King	6	7

Preceded by 1971 French Open – Women's singles	Grand Slam women's singles	Succeeded by 1971 US Open – Women's singles
