= 1973 Wimbledon Championships – Women's singles =

Women's singles
- 1973 Wimbledon Championships

Final
- Champion: (United States) Billie Jean King
- Runner-up: (United States) Chris Evert
- Score: 6–0, 7–5

Details
- Draw: 96 (8 Q )
- Seeds: 8

Events
Singles	men	women		boys	girls
Doubles	men	women	mixed	boys	girls
← 1972 ·	Wimbledon Championships	· 1974 →

Defending champion Billie Jean King defeated Chris Evert in the final, 6–0, 7–5 to win the ladies' singles tennis title at the 1973 Wimbledon Championships. It was her fifth Wimbledon singles title and tenth major singles title overall.

This marked the first Wimbledon appearance of future nine-time champion and world No. 1 Martina Navratilova; she was defeated by Patti Hogan in the third round.

== Seeds ==
1. (Australia) Margaret Court (semifinals)
2. (United States) Billie Jean King (champion)
3. (Australia) Evonne Goolagong (semifinals)
4. (United States) Chris Evert (final)
5. (United States) Rosie Casals (quarterfinals)
6. (United Kingdom) Virginia Wade (quarterfinals)
7. (Australia) Kerry Melville (quarterfinals)
8. (Soviet Union) Olga Morozova (quarterfinals)

Click on the seed number of a player to go to their draw section. For the first time since 1954, all eight seeded players reached the quarter-final stage of the tournament.

== Draw ==
=== Key ===
- Q = Qualifier
- WC = Wild card
- LL = Lucky loser
- Alt = Alternate
- ITF = ITF entry
- PR = Protected ranking
- SR = Special ranking
- SE = Special exempt
- JE = Junior exempt
- JR = Junior Accelerator Programme entrant
- CO = College Accelerator Programme entrant
- NG = Next Gen Accelerator Program entrant
- w/o = Walkover
- r = Retired
- d = Defaulted

=== Finals ===
Quarterfinals
1	(Australia) Margaret Court	4	6	6
8	(Soviet Union) Olga Morozova	6	4	1
4	(United States) Chris Evert	6	4	6
5	(United States) Rosie Casals	2	6	2
6	(United Kingdom) Virginia Wade	3	3
3	(Australia) Evonne Goolagong	6	6
7	(Australia) Kerry Melville	8	6
2	(United States) Billie Jean King	9	8

Semifinals
1	(Australia) Margaret Court	1	6	1
4	(United States) Chris Evert	6	1	6
3	(Australia) Evonne Goolagong	3	7	3
2	(United States) Billie Jean King	6	5	6

Final
4	(United States) Chris Evert	0	5
2	(United States) Billie Jean King	6	7

=== Top half ===
==== Section 1 ====
First round

Second round
1	(Australia) M Court	6	6
(Australia) K Krantzcke	2	3
Q	(United States) K Latham	6	6
(New Zealand) M Pryde	1	1
(United Kingdom) G Coles	6	6
(United Kingdom) J Fayter	3	3
(United Kingdom) P Moor	3	6	7
(Indonesia) L Kaligis	6	0	5

Third round
1	(Australia) M Court	6	6
Q	(United States) K Latham	2	3
(United Kingdom) G Coles	6	6
(United Kingdom) P Moor	2	1

Fourth round
1	(Australia) M Court	6	6
(United Kingdom) G Coles	1	4

==== Section 2 ====
First round

Second round
8	(Soviet Union) O Morozova	7	6
(Australia) P Coleman	5	2
(United Kingdom) J Williams	6	9
(Argentina) R Giscafré	4	8
(Netherlands) G Walhof	7	1
(United States) J Newberry	9	6
(United Kingdom) L Charles	4	2
(Sweden) I Bentzer	6	6

Third round
8	(Soviet Union) O Morozova	7	6
(United Kingdom) J Williams	5	3
(United States) J Newberry	1	6	3
(Sweden) I Bentzer	6	4	6

Fourth round
8	(Soviet Union) O Morozova	7	6
(Sweden) I Bentzer	5	1

==== Section 3 ====
First round
4	(United States) C Evert	6	6
(Uruguay) F Bonicelli	3	3
(Czechoslovakia) R Tomanová	4	0
(Romania) J Gohn	6	6
(United States) J Heldman	6	8
(United Kingdom) W Wooldridge	1	6
(Czechoslovakia) M Neumannová	3	3
(Netherlands) M Schaar	6	6
(Indonesia) L Sugiarto	0	4
(United Kingdom) S Barker	6	6
(United Kingdom) S Brasher	0	6	2
(United Kingdom) L Blachford	6	2	6
(West Germany) K Ebbinghaus	1	6	2
(United States) M Redondo	6	2	6
(United Kingdom) V Burton	4	5
(Australia) J Young	6	7

Second round
4	(United States) C Evert	6	6
(Romania) J Gohn	0	1
(United States) J Heldman	6	6
(Netherlands) M Schaar	2	1
(United Kingdom) S Barker	6	4	3
(United Kingdom) L Blachford	3	6	6
(United States) M Redondo	3	1
(Australia) J Young	6	6

Third round
4	(United States) C Evert	6	6
(United States) J Heldman	3	1
(United Kingdom) L Blachford	5	6	0
(Australia) J Young	7	4	6

Fourth round
4	(United States) C Evert	6	3	8
(Australia) J Young	3	6	6

==== Section 4 ====
First round
5	(United States) R Casals	6	6
(South Africa) B Kirk	0	1
(South Africa) L Rossouw	4	3
(United Kingdom) S Mappin	6	6
Q	(United States) T Fretz	6	6
(United Kingdom) L Mottram	1	3
(Romania) M Simionescu	4	2
Q	(Canada) V Berner	6	6
(Belgium) M Gurdal	2	9	3
(United States) V Ziegenfuss	6	8	6
(United States) L Tenney	0	6
(United States) L Fleming	6	8
(Australia) H Gourlay	1	3
(United States) K Kemmer	6	6
(United States) J Anthony	8	4
(South Africa) D Boshoff	9	6

Second round
5	(United States) R Casals	6	6
(United Kingdom) S Mappin	3	4
Q	(United States) T Fretz	6	6
Q	(Canada) V Berner	4	3
(United States) V Ziegenfuss	6	2	6
(United States) L Fleming	4	6	3
(United States) K Kemmer	7	6
(South Africa) D Boshoff	5	4

Third round
5	(United States) R Casals	7	7
Q	(United States) T Fretz	5	5
(United States) V Ziegenfuss	9	4	3
(United States) K Kemmer	8	6	6

Fourth round
5	(United States) R Casals	6	6
(United States) K Kemmer	3	3

=== Bottom half ===
==== Section 5 ====
First round
(France) F Dürr	6	6
Q	(United Kingdom) C Colman	3	0
(Czechoslovakia) V Vopičková	6	1	8
(United Kingdom) C Molesworth	3	6	6
(Soviet Union) M Kroschina	6	6
LL	(United States) J Dixon	3	4
Q	(Sweden) M Wikstedt	6	8	9
Q	(United Kingdom) A Coe	0	9	7
(Japan) K Sawamatsu	6	6
(Austria) S Pachta	2	2
(France) O de Roubin	4	2
(United States) P Teeguarden	6	6
(United States) P Bostrom	6	7
(United States) K Pigeon	3	5
(Australia) D Fromholtz	6	2	1
6	(United Kingdom) V Wade	3	6	6

Second round
(France) F Dürr	6	6
(Czechoslovakia) V Vopičková	2	1
(Soviet Union) M Kroschina	3	6	6
Q	(Sweden) M Wikstedt	6	0	2
(Japan) K Sawamatsu	7	5	5
(United States) P Teeguarden	5	7	7
(United States) P Bostrom	5	2
6	(United Kingdom) V Wade	7	6

Third round
(France) F Dürr	6	2	6
(Soviet Union) M Kroschina	4	6	0
(United States) P Teeguarden	2	3
6	(United Kingdom) V Wade	6	6

Fourth round
(France) F Dürr	6	3	5
6	(United Kingdom) V Wade	4	6	7

==== Section 6 ====
First round
(United States) L Tuero	6	3	2
(France) N Fuchs	1	6	6
(United States) P Hogan	7	6	6
(Australia) C Doerner	9	4	4
(United Kingdom) C Janes	1	4
(Czechoslovakia) M Navrátilová	6	6
(United States) L duPont	6	6
(Japan) H Goto	2	2
(United States) S Walsh	9	2	4
(Colombia) I Fernández de Soto	7	6	6
Q	(Canada) J Tindle	6	1	4
(Australia) W Turnbull	4	6	6
(United Kingdom) J Cooper	6	6
(United States) B Downs	0	4
(Netherlands) B Stöve	3	3
3	(Australia) E Goolagong	6	6

Second round
(France) N Fuchs	3	2
(United States) P Hogan	6	6
(Czechoslovakia) M Navrátilová	8	6
(United States) L duPont	6	4
(Colombia) I Fernández de Soto	3	3
(Australia) W Turnbull	6	6
(United Kingdom) J Cooper	3	1
3	(Australia) E Goolagong	6	6

Third round
(United States) P Hogan	6	6
(Czechoslovakia) M Navrátilová	4	4
(Australia) W Turnbull	4	1
3	(Australia) E Goolagong	6	6

Fourth round
(United States) P Hogan	0	1
3	(Australia) E Goolagong	6	6

==== Section 7 ====
First round

Second round
(Sweden) C Sandberg	6	4	7
(United Kingdom) L Beaven	2	6	5
(United States) S Stap	4	4
Q	(United States) M Michel	6	6
(United States) W Overton	2	7	2
(South Africa) P Pretorius	6	5	6
(South Africa) I Kloss	1	4
7	(Australia) K Melville	6	6

Third round
(Sweden) C Sandberg	1	0
Q	(United States) M Michel	6	6
(South Africa) P Pretorius	1	1
7	(Australia) K Melville	6	6

Fourth round
Q	(United States) M Michel	2	6	4
7	(Australia) K Melville	6	3	6

==== Section 8 ====
First round

Second round
(Australia) W Paish	3	2
(Australia) L Hunt	6	6
(United States) A Kiyomura	6	2	4
(United States) M Schallau	1	6	6
(Australia) K Harris	6	6
(Romania) V Ruzici	1	3
(Italy) L Bassi	0	2
2	(United States) BJ King	6	6

Third round
(Australia) L Hunt	6	6
(United States) M Schallau	2	3
(Australia) K Harris	2	3
2	(United States) BJ King	6	6

Fourth round
(Australia) L Hunt	4	7	0
2	(United States) BJ King	6	5	6

Preceded by 1973 French Open – Women's singles	Grand Slam women's singles	Succeeded by 1973 US Open – Women's singles
