= Olga Morozova =

Soviet tennis player (born 1949)

- Country (sports): Soviet Union
- Residence: Marlow, England, United Kingdom
- Born: 22 February 1949 (age 77) Moscow, Soviet Union
- Height: 1.70 m (5 ft 7 in)
- Turned pro: 1965 (ILTF World Circuit)
- Retired: 1977 and 1989
- Plays: Right-handed (one-handed backhand)
- Prize money: n/a

Singles
- Career record: 354–133
- Career titles: 8
- Highest ranking: No. 3 (US Open 1974)

Grand Slam singles results
- Australian Open: QF (1972, 1975)
- French Open: F (1974)
- Wimbledon: F (1974)
- US Open: QF (1972)

Other tournaments
- Tour Finals: 5th place (1975)

Doubles
- Career record: 0–0
- Career titles: 16

Grand Slam doubles results
- Australian Open: F (1975)
- French Open: W (1974)
- Wimbledon: SF (1974)
- US Open: F (1976)

Grand Slam mixed doubles results
- Australian Open: n/a
- French Open: SF (1974)
- Wimbledon: F (1968, 1970)
- US Open: SF (1976)
Medal record
Representing Soviet Union
Tennis
Summer Universiade
Gold medal – first place	1973 Moscow	Women's singles
Gold medal – first place	1973 Moscow	Women's doubles
Gold medal – first place	1973 Moscow	Mixed doubles

Olga Vasilyevna Morozova (Russian: Ольга Васильевна Морозова, IPA: [ˈolʲɡə mɐˈrozəvə]; born 22 February 1949) is a Russian former professional tennis player. Competing for the Soviet Union, she was the runner-up in women's singles at the 1974 French Open and 1974 Wimbledon Championships, and the first Soviet player to win a major, in women's doubles at the 1974 French Open. Her ground-breaking playing career, combined with her distinguished coaching career, has led to Morozova being labelled the "Godmother of Russian tennis".

== Career ==
Morozova started playing tennis at the age of 10, with Nina Teplyakova as her first and career-long coach. By 16, Morozova had improved so quickly that she was invited to represent the USSR at Wimbledon in the girls singles.

Travelling internationally for the first time and playing on grass for the first time, Morozova won the 1965 Wimbledon Junior Girls' singles title.

Morozova would go on to become the first Soviet tennis player, male or female, to reach the singles final of any major tournament when she was the runner-up at the 1972 Italian Open. However, the peak of Morozova's career came during the summer of 1974 when she was the women's singles runner-up at both Wimbledon and the French Open, losing to Chris Evert on both occasions. At Wimbledon she shocked the defending champion Billie Jean King in straight sets in the quarterfinals, and then came back from a set down against Virginia Wade to win the semifinal 6–4 in the third. She rose to No. 3 in the world going into the US Open that year – the highest ranking she achieved in her career.

Morozova became the first Soviet tennis player, male or female, to win a major title when she teamed with Evert to win the women's doubles championship at the French Open in 1974. She was also the first Soviet player to lead her team to the Federation Cup semifinals in 1978 (and again in 1979). She and Alex Metreveli were the first USSR players to reach a Grand Slam tournament final when they teamed at Wimbledon in 1968, losing to Margaret Court and Ken Fletcher. In addition to winning the French Open doubles in 1974, Morozova finished runner-up at the 1975 Australian Open (teaming with Margaret Court), the 1975 French Open (with Julie Anthony) and the 1976 US Open (with Virginia Wade).

Morozova's playing career was cut short in 1977 because of the USSR's policy against allowing their athletes to compete with South Africans. At this point, she retired early from the professional tour. Morozova then began a coaching career. She became head coach of the Soviet Union ladies squad through the 1980s leading the Soviets to their first appearance in a Federation Cup Final (1988, losing to Czechoslovakia). Morozova also helped pioneer the creation of the Kremlin Cup.

In 1990, the LTA hired Morozova as head of girls tennis, based at the national performance centre in Bisham Abbey, UK. Morozova became a fixture in UK tennis for much of the 1990s. In December 1996, in a Russian interview, she noted a key difference in the approach to sport between the UK and Russia: "For them [the English], participation is considered more important than winning. They fancy Coubertin a lot. For us, Russians, it is still important to win". Andy Murray has subsequently mentioned that she coached him when he was "12, 13 years old".

In 2003, Morozova began working individually with notable players, including amongst others Elena Dementieva, Svetlana Kuznetsova, Sergiy Stakhovsky, Laura Robson and more recently Harriet Dart. Morozova has been widely credited as one of the few female coaches to work at the very highest levels of the tour.

In 1998, she was awarded the Sarah Palfrey Danzig Trophy for character, sportsmanship, manners, spirit of cooperation, and contribution to the growth of the game as well as the help she rendered to professional players and junior players.

In 2000, the Russian Tennis Federation awarded Morozova the honour of Russian Tennis Player of the Twentieth Century.

Morozova's husband is Viktor Roubanov (1971 champion of Moscow in singles), and he also was one of the first coaches of Anna Kournikova. He also coached Shirli-Ann Siddall during her first breakthrough — winning a match in the Wimbledon main draw — period.

== Grand Slam finals ==
=== Singles: 2 (2 runner-ups) ===
Result	Year	Championship	Surface	Opponent	Score
Loss	1974	French Open	Clay	(United States) Chris Evert	1–6, 2–6
Loss	1974	Wimbledon	Grass	(United States) Chris Evert	0–6, 4–6

=== Doubles: 4 (1 title, 3 runner-ups) ===
Result	Year	Championship	Surface	Partner	Opponents	Score
Win	1974	French Open	Clay	(United States) Chris Evert	(France) Gail Chanfreau (West Germany) Katja Ebbinghaus	6–4, 2–6, 6–1
Loss	1975	Australian Open	Grass	(Australia) Margaret Court	(Australia) Evonne Goolagong (United States) Peggy Michel	6–7, 6–7
Loss	1975	French Open	Clay	(United States) Julie Anthony	(United States) Chris Evert (Czechoslovakia) Martina Navratilova	3–6, 2–6
Loss	1976	US Open	Clay	(United Kingdom) Virginia Wade	(South Africa) Linky Boshoff (South Africa) Ilana Kloss	1–6, 4–6

=== Mixed doubles: 2 (2 runner-ups) ===
Result	Year	Championship	Surface	Partner	Opponents	Score
Loss	1968	Wimbledon	Grass	(Soviet Union) Alex Metreveli	(Australia) Margaret Court (Australia) Ken Fletcher	1–6, 12–14
Loss	1970	Wimbledon	Grass	(Soviet Union) Alex Metreveli	(United States) Rosemary Casals (Romania) Ilie Năstase	3–6, 6–4, 7–9

== WTA Tour finals ==
=== Singles: 16 (8 titles, 8 runner-ups) ===
Result	W/L	Date	Tournament	Surface	Opponent	Score
Loss	0–1	Jan 1971	Sydney, Australia	Hard	(Australia) Margaret Court	2–6, 2–6
Win	1–1	Feb 1971	Moscow, Soviet Union	Carpet (i)	(Soviet Union) Maria Kull	6–1, 7–5
Win	2–1	Apr 1971	Buenos Aires, Argentina	Clay	(Italy) Anna-Maria Nasuelli	6–0, 6–3
Loss	2–2	Jan 1972	Adelaide, Australia	Hard	(Australia) Evonne Goolagong	6–7^{(4–7)}, 3–6
Loss	2–3	Jan 1972	Perth, Australia	Hard	(Australia) Evonne Goolagong	2–6, 5–7
Loss	2–4	Apr 1972	Rome, Italy	Clay	(United States) Linda Tuero	4–6, 3–6
Win	3–4	Aug 1972	New Jersey, United States	Grass	(Soviet Union) Marina Kroschina	6–2, 6–7, 7–5
Loss	3–5	Mar 1973	Akron, United States	Hard	(United States) Chris Evert	3–6, 4–6
Win	4–5	Jun 1973	London, United Kingdom	Grass	(Australia) Evonne Goolagong	6–2, 6–3
Win	5–5	Apr 1974	Philadelphia, United States	Hard (i)	(United States) Billie Jean King	7–6, 6–1
Loss	5–6	Jun 1974	French Open	Clay	(United States) Chris Evert	1–6, 2–6
Loss	5–7	Jul 1974	Wimbledon	Grass	(United States) Chris Evert	0–6, 4–6
Win	6–7	Dec 1974	Adelaide, Australia	Grass	(Australia) Evonne Goolagong	7–6, 2–6, 6–2
Loss	6–8	Dec 1974	Perth, Australia	Hard	(Australia) Margaret Court	4–6, 5–7
Win	7–8	Jan 1975	Moscow, Soviet Union	Carpet (i)	(Soviet Union) Yelena Granaturova	6–0, 1–6, 6–4
Win	8–8	Jun 1976	Beckenham, UK	Grass	(South Africa) Marise Kruger	7–5, 2–6, 6–3

=== Doubles: 27 (16 titles, 11 runner-ups) ===
Result	No.	Date	Tournament	Surface	Partner	Opponent	Score
Win	1.	Jan 1971	Sydney, Australia	Hard	(Australia) Margaret Court	(Australia) Helen Gourlay (Australia) Kerry Harris	6–2, 6–0
Loss	2.	Feb 1971	Moscow, Soviet Union	Carpet (i)	(Soviet Union) Yelena Granaturova	(Soviet Union) Eugenia Birioukova (Soviet Union) Marina Kroschina	6–7, 7–5, 5–7
Win	3.	Apr 1971	Buenos Aires, Argentina	Clay	(Netherlands) Betty Stöve	(Argentina) Beatriz Araujo (Argentina) Ines Roget	7–5, 6–1
Loss	4.	Jun 1971	Beckenham, UK	Grass	(Soviet Union) Zaiga Jansone	(United Kingdom) Christine Truman (United Kingdom) Nell Truman	3–6, 7–9
Win	5.	Jan 1972	Adelaide, Australia	Hard	(Australia) Evonne Goolagong	(Australia) Marilyn Tesch (Australia) Kerry Hogarth	6–3, 6–0
Loss	6.	Jan 1972	Perth, Australia	Hard	(Australia) Janet Young	(Australia) Evonne Goolagong (Australia) Barbara Hawcroft	3–6, 0–6
Win	7.	Apr 1972	Rome, Italy	Clay	(Australia) Lesley Hunt	(France) Gail Chanfreau (Italy) Rosalba Vido	6–3, 6–4
Win	8.	Aug 1972	New Jersey, US	Grass	(Soviet Union) Marina Kroschina	(United States) Carole Caldwell (United States) Patti Hogan	6–7, 6–2, 6–2
Win	9.	Mar 1973	Hingham, US	Hard	(Soviet Union) Marina Kroschina	(Australia) Evonne Goolagong (Australia) Janet Young	6–2, 6–4
Win	10.	Jun 1973	Rome, Italy	Clay	(United Kingdom) Virginia Wade	(Czechoslovakia) Martina Navratilova (Czechoslovakia) Renáta Tomanová	3–6, 6–2, 7–5
Win	11.	Jun 1973	Beckenham, UK	Clay	(Soviet Union) Marina Kroschina	(United Kingdom) Jackie Fayter (United States) Peggy Michel	8–6, 6–3
Loss	12.	Mar 1974	Akron, US	Hard	(United States) Julie Heldman	(United States) Rosie Casals (United States) Billie Jean King	2–6, 4–6
Win	13.	Apr 1974	St. Petersburg, US	Hard	(Netherlands) Betty Stöve	(United States) Chris Evert (Australia) Evonne Goolagong	6–4, 6–2
Win	14.	Apr 1974	Hilton Head, US	Hard	(United States) Rosie Casals	(Australia) Karen Krantzcke (Australia) Helen Gourlay	6–2, 6–1
Win	15.	May 1974	Rome, Italy	Clay	(United States) Chris Evert	(West Germany) Helga Masthoff (West Germany) Heide Orth	w/o
Win	16.	Jun 1974	French Open	Clay	(United States) Chris Evert	(France) Gail Chanfreau (West Germany) Katja Ebbinghaus	6–4, 2–6, 6–1
Win	17.	Dec 1974	Perth, Australia	Hard	(Czechoslovakia) Martina Navratilova	(Australia) Lesley Hunt (Japan) Kazuko Sawamatsu	6–1, 6–3
Loss	18.	Dec 1974	Sydney, Australia	Hard	(Czechoslovakia) Martina Navratilova	(Australia) Evonne Goolagong (United States) Peggy Michel	7–6, 4–6, 1–6
Loss	19.	Jan 1975	Australian Open	Grass	(Australia) Margaret Court	(Australia) Evonne Goolagong (United States) Peggy Michel	6–7, 6–7
Loss	20.	Feb 1975	Chicago, US	Hard	(Australia) Margaret Court	(United States) Chris Evert (Czechoslovakia) Martina Navratilova	2–6, 5–7
Loss	21.	Apr 1975	Amelia Island, US	Hard	(United States) Rosie Casals	(Australia) Evonne Goolagong (United Kingdom) Virginia Wade	6–4, 4–6, 2–6
Loss	22.	Jun 1975	French Open	Clay	(United States) Julie Anthony	(United States) Chris Evert (Czechoslovakia) Martina Navratilova	3–6, 2–6
Win	23.	Jun 1975	Eastbourne, UK	Gras	(United States) Julie Anthony	(Australia) Evonne Goolagong (United States) Peggy Michel	6–2, 6–4
Win	24.	Jan 1976	Washington, US	Hard	(United Kingdom) Virginia Wade	(United States) Wendy Overton (United States) Mona Schallau	7–6, 6–2
Win	25.	Jan 1976	Chicago, US	Hard	(United Kingdom) Virginia Wade	(Australia) Evonne Goolagong (United States) Martina Navratilova	6–7^{(4–5)}, 6–4, 6–4
Loss	26.	Sep 1976	US Open	Clay	(United Kingdom) Virginia Wade	(South Africa) Linky Boshoff (South Africa) Ilana Kloss	1–6, 4–6
Loss	27.	Jun 1977	Beckenham, UK	Grass	(Soviet Union) Natasha Chmyreva	(South Africa) Brigitte Cuypers (South Africa) Annette du Plooy	7–9, 4–6

== ITF Circuit finals ==
=== Singles: 30 (25–5) ===
Result	No.	Date	Tournament	Surface	Opponent	Score
Win	1.	Jan 1967	Moscow, Soviet Union	Hard (i)	(Soviet Union) Anna Dmitrieva	9–7, 8–6
Win	2.	Sep 1967	Tbilisi, Soviet Union	Hard (i)	(Soviet Union) Anna Dmitrieva	7–5, 4–6, 6–1
Win	3.	Jan 1968	Moscow, Soviet Union	Hard (i)	(Soviet Union) Anna Dmitrieva	7–9, 6–1, 10–8
Win	4.	Aug 1968	Moscow, Soviet Union	Hard	(Soviet Union) Marina Chuvirina	6–1, 6–3
Win	5.	Feb 1969	Moscow, Soviet Union	Hard (i)	(Netherlands) Betty Stöve	6–2, 6–2
Loss	6.	Mar 1969	Cairo, Egypt	Clay	(Italy) Lea Pericoli	1–6, 2–6
Loss	7.	Mar 1969	Alexandria, Egypt	Clay	(United Kingdom) Nell Truman	3–6, 6–2, 3–6
Win	8.	Jan 1970	Moscow, Soviet Union	Hard (i)	(Soviet Union) Marina Chuvirina	6–3, 6–2
Win	9.	Feb 1970	Moscow, Soviet Union	Hard (i)	(Soviet Union) Anna Yeremeyeva	6–4, 6–2
Loss	10.	Feb 1970	Moscow, Soviet Union	Hard (i)	(West Germany) Helga Niessen	5–7, 6–2, 3–6
Win	11.	Mar 1970	Cairo, Egypt	Clay	(Italy) Lea Pericoli	6–3, 3–6, 9–7
Win	12.	Mar 1970	Cairo, Egypt	Clay	(Czechoslovakia) Marcela Barochová	6–4, 6–0
Loss	13.	Jun 1970	Beckenham, United Kingdom	Grass	(United States) Patti Hogan	1–6, 3–6
Win	14.	Aug 1970	Moscow, Soviet Union	Clay	(Soviet Union) Tiiu Kivi	6–4, 6–4
Win	15.	Dec 1970	Adelaide, Australia	Hard	(United States) Kristien Shaw-Kemmer	6–4, 4–6, 9–7
Win	16.	Mar 1971	Cairo, Egypt	Clay	(Italy) Lea Pericoli	7–5, 6–0
Win	17.	Jan 1972	Hobart, Australia	Grass	(United States) Mona Schallau	6–3, 6–3
Win	18.	Jan 1972	Perth, Australia	Grass	(Australia) Janet Young	6–4, 6–2
Win	19.	Apr 1972	Tashkent, Soviet Union	Hard	(Soviet Union) Eugenia Birioukova	6–2, 6–0
Win	20.	Jun 1972	Beckenham, United Kingdom	Grass	(United Kingdom) Jill Cooper	6–4, 6–1
Win	21.	Aug 1972	Tallinn, Estonia	Clay	(Soviet Union) Zaiga Jansone	6–1, 6–0
Loss	22.	Aug 1972	Bucarest, Romania	Clay	(Soviet Union) Marina Kroschina	6–4, 2–6, 5–7
Win	23.	Aug 1972	Moscow, Soviet Union	Clay	(Soviet Union) Marina Kroschina	8–6, 6–2
Win	24.	Feb 1973	Baku, Soviet Union	Hard (i)	(Soviet Union) Marina Kroschina	6–1, 6–2
Win	25.	Mar 1973	Moscow, Soviet Union	Hard (i)	(Soviet Union) Galina Baksheeva	6–2, 6–3
Win	26.	Aug 1973	Pescara, Italy	Clay	(Hungary) Éva Szabó	6–0, 1–6, 9–7
Win	27.	Feb 1974	Salavat, Soviet Union	Hard (i)	(Soviet Union) Yelena Granaturova	6–4, 4–6, 6–2
Win	28.	Feb 1974	Moscow, Soviet Union	Hard (i)	(Soviet Union) Marina Kroschina	6–3, 6–1
Win	29.	Aug 1975	Tallinn, Estonia	Clay	(Soviet Union) Marina Kroschina	2–6, 7–6, 6–0
Win	30.	Aug 1979	Sopot, Poland	Clay	(Czechoslovakia) Hana Mandlíková	4–6, 7–6, 6–3

=== Doubles: 37 (27–10) ===
Result	No.	Date	Tournament	Surface	Partner	Opponents	Score
Loss	1.	February 1967	Moscow, Soviet Union	Hard (i)	(Soviet Union) Tatiana Chalko	(Soviet Union) Galina Baksheeva (Soviet Union) Anna Dmitrieva	2–6, 1–6
Loss	2.	March 1967	Moscow, Soviet Union	Hard (i)	(Soviet Union) Tatiana Chalko	(Soviet Union) Galina Baksheeva (Soviet Union) Anna Dmitrieva	3–6, 1–6
Loss	3.	February 1968	Moscow, Soviet Union	Hard (i)	(Soviet Union) Rauza Islanova	(Soviet Union) Galina Baksheeva (Soviet Union) Anna Dmitrieva	2–6, 5–7
Win	4.	July 1968	Båstad, Sweden	Hard	(Sweden) Eva Lundqvist	(United States) Kathy Harter (United States) Julie Heldman	6–2, 6–3
Win	5.	August 1968	Moscow, Soviet Union	Hard	(Soviet Union) Marina Chuvirina	(Australia) Kerry Harris (Australia) Lesley Hunt	6–0, 6–4
Win	6.	February 1969	Moscow, Soviet Union	Hard (i)	(Soviet Union) Zaiga Jansone	(Soviet Union) Tiiu Kivi (Soviet Union) Maria Kull	6–4, 8–6
Win	7.	August 1969	Moscow, Soviet Union	Hard	(Soviet Union) Zaiga Jansone	(Soviet Union) Galina Baksheeva (Soviet Union) Marina Chuvirina	6–3, 6–2
Win	8.	September 1969	Turin, Italy	Hard	(Soviet Union) Zaiga Jansone	(Soviet Union) Marina Chuvirina (Soviet Union) Tiiu Kivi	6–1, 4–6, 6–3
Win	9.	January 1970	Moscow, Soviet Union	Hard (i)	(Soviet Union) Zaiga Jansone	(Soviet Union) Rauza Islanova (Soviet Union) Eugenia Isopaitis	6–2, 6–2
Win	10.	February 1970	Moscow, Soviet Union	Hard (i)	(Soviet Union) Zaiga Jansone	(Soviet Union) Tiiu Kivi (Soviet Union) Maria Kull	6–3, 6–4
Loss	11.	February 1970	Moscow, Soviet Union	Hard (i)	(Soviet Union) Zaiga Jansone	(United Kingdom) Nell Truman (United Kingdom) Joyce Williams	5–7, 5–7
Win	12.	August 1970	Sofia, Bulgaria	Clay	(Soviet Union) Tiiu Kivi	(Soviet Union) Eugenia Isopaitis (Soviet Union) Marina Kroschina	6–2, 6–1
Win	13.	August 1970	Moscow, Soviet Union	Clay	(Soviet Union) Tiiu Kivi	(United States) Peggy Michel (United States) Valerie Ziegenfuss	6–4, 6–3
Win	14.	January 1971	Hobart, Australia	Grass	(United States) Patti Hogan	(South Africa) Brenda Kirk (South Africa) Laura Rossouw	6–2, 6–0
Loss	15.	January 1972	Hobart, Australia	Grass	(Australia) Barbara Hawcroft	(United States) Mona Schallau (Australia) Janet Young	3–6, 2–6
Win	16.	February 1972	Moscow, Soviet Union	Hard (i)	(Soviet Union) Zaiga Jansone	(Soviet Union) Eugenia Birioukova (Soviet Union) Marina Kroschina	6–3, 5–7, 6–4
Loss	17.	April 1972	Monte Carlo, Monaco	Clay	(West Germany) Helga Niessen Masthoff	(Italy) Lucia Bassi (Italy) Lea Pericoli	4–6, 4–6
Win	18.	April 1972	Tashkent, Soviet Union	Hard	(Soviet Union) Zaiga Jansone	(Soviet Union) Eugenia Birioukova (Soviet Union) Marina Kroschina	5–7, 6–3, 11–9
Win	19.	June 1972	Beckenham, United Kingdom	Grass	(United States) Sharon Walsh	(United States) Laura DuPont (United States) Mona Schallau	8–6, 6–1
Win	20.	August 1972	Tallinn, Estonia	Clay	(Soviet Union) Zaiga Jansone	(Soviet Union) Galina Baksheeva (Soviet Union) Anna Yeremeyeva	4–6, 6–3, 6–3
Win	21.	August 1972	Bucarest, Romania	Clay	(Soviet Union) Zaiga Jansone	(Soviet Union) Eugenia Birioukova (Soviet Union) Marina Kroschina	6–1, 6–1
Win	22.	October 1972	Donetsk, Soviet Union	Clay	(Soviet Union) Zaiga Jansone	(Soviet Union) Aleksandra Ivanova (Soviet Union) Eugenia Isopaitis	6–3, 6–3
Loss	23.	January 1973	Moscow, Soviet Union	Hard (i)	(Soviet Union) Eugenia Isopaitis	(Soviet Union) Galina Baksheeva (Soviet Union) Marina Chuvirina	3–6, 6–3, 3–6
Win	24.	January 1973	Tallinn, Estonia	Hard (i)	(Soviet Union) Marina Chuvirina	(Soviet Union) Eugenia Birioukova (Soviet Union) Anna Yeremeyeva	6–0, 7–5
Win	25.	February 1973	Baku, Soviet Union	Hard (i)	(Soviet Union) Zaiga Jansone	(Soviet Union) Galina Baksheeva (Soviet Union) Marina Chuvirina	6–3, 6–1
Win	26.	July 1973	Kitzbühel, Austria	Clay	(Soviet Union) Aleksandra Ivanova	(Australia) Janet Young (Australia) Evonne Goolagong	2–6, 6–4, 6–2
Win	27.	August 1973	Pescara, Italy	Clay	(Soviet Union) Zaiga Jansone	(Soviet Union) Eugenia Birioukova (Soviet Union) Marina Kroschina	6–3, 3–6, 6–1
Win	28.	February 1974	Salavat, Soviet Union	Hard (i)	(Soviet Union) Eugenia Birioukova	(Soviet Union) Rauza Islanova (Soviet Union) Eugenia Isopaitis	6–3, 6–4
Loss	29.	February 1974	Moscow, Soviet Union	Hard (i)	(Soviet Union) Eugenia Birioukova	(Soviet Union) Galina Baksheeva (Soviet Union) Marina Chuvirina	5–7, 1–6
Loss	30.	June 1974	Eastbourne, United Kingdom	Grass	(United States) Chris Evert	(Australia) Helen Gourlay-Cawley (Australia) Karen Krantzcke	2–6, 0–6
Win	31.	August 1974	Wrocław, Poland	Clay	(Soviet Union) Marina Kroschina	(Soviet Union) Natasha Chmyreva (Soviet Union) Yelena Granaturova	6–2, 6–0
Win	32.	July 1975	Tallinn, Estonia	Clay	(Soviet Union) Marina Kroschina	(Soviet Union) Natasha Chmyreva (Soviet Union) Marina Chuvirina	6–1, 6–2
Win	33.	August 1975	Vienna, Austria	Clay	(Soviet Union) Marina Kroschina	(Czechoslovakia) Martina Navratilova (Czechoslovakia) Renáta Tomanová	4–6, 7–5, 6–4
Win	34.	August 1975	Tallinn, Estonia	Clay	(Soviet Union) Marina Kroschina	(Soviet Union) Galina Baksheeva (Soviet Union) Lydia Zinkevich	6–7, 6–4, 6–2
Loss	35.	November 1975	Osaka, Japan	Hard (i)	(United States) Jeanne Evert	(France) Françoise Dürr (United States) Rosie Casals	3–6, 3–6
Win	36.	August 1976	Přerov, Czechoslovakia	Clay	(Soviet Union) Marina Chuvirina	(Soviet Union) Galina Baksheeva (Soviet Union) Natasha Chmyreva	6–4, 6–4
Win	37.	August 1979	Sopot, Soviet Union	Clay	(Soviet Union) Natasha Chmyreva	(Soviet Union) Eugenia Birioukova (Soviet Union) Natalia Borodina	1–6, 6–0, 6–0

== Junior Grand Slam finals ==
=== Girls' singles (1–0) ===
Result	Year	Tournament	Surface	Opponent	Score
Win	1965	Wimbledon	Grass	(Argentina) Raquel Giscafré	6–3, 6–3

== Grand Slam singles performance timeline ==
Key
W	F	SF	QF	#R	RR	Q#	DNQ	A	NH

(W) winner; (F) finalist; (SF) semifinalist; (QF) quarterfinalist; (#R) rounds 4, 3, 2, 1; (RR) round-robin stage; (Q#) qualification round; (DNQ) did not qualify; (A) absent; (NH) not held; (SR) strike rate (events won / competed); (W–L) win–loss record.

Tournament	1966	1967	1968	1969	1970	1971	1972	1973	1974	1975	1976	Career SR
Australian Open	A	A	A	A	A	A	QF	A	A	QF	A	0 / 2
French Open	A	1R	2R	3R	2R	2R	QF	2R	F	SF	A	0 / 9
Wimbledon	1R	A	1R	4R	2R	3R	4R	QF	F	QF	QF	0 / 10
US Open	A	A	A	A	3R	A	QF	3R	A	2R	3R	0 / 5
SR	0 / 1	0 / 1	0 / 2	0 / 2	0 / 3	0 / 2	0 / 4	0 / 3	0 / 2	0 / 4	0 / 2	0 / 26
Year-end ranking										7	9	

== Bibliography ==
- Olga Morozova (2000). Only Tennis (in Russian). Moscow: Vagrius. Archived from the original on 26 February 2007.

== See also ==
- Performance timelines for all female tennis players since 1978 who reached at least one Grand Slam final
