= 1966 French Championships – Women's singles =

Women's singles
- 1966 French Championships

Final
- Champion: (United Kingdom) Ann Jones
- Runner-up: (United States) Nancy Richey
- Score: 6–3, 6–1

Details
- Seeds: 16

Events
| Singles | men | women |
| Doubles | men | women |
| ← 1965 · | French Championships | · 1967 → |

Third-seeded Ann Jones defeated Nancy Richey 6–3, 6–1 in the final to win the women's singles tennis title at the 1966 French Championships.

== Seeds ==
The seeded players are listed below. Ann Jones is the champion; others show the round in which they were eliminated.

1. (Australia) Margaret Smith (semifinals)
2. (Brazil) Maria Bueno (semifinals)
3. (United Kingdom) Ann Jones (champion)
4. (South Africa) Annette Van Zyl (quarterfinals)
5. (United States) Nancy Richey (finalist)
6. (United States) Carole Graebner (first round)
7. (Australia) Judy Tegart (fourth round)
8. (West Germany) Edda Buding (fourth round)
9. (Argentina) Raquel Giscafré (second round)
10. (France) Françoise Dürr (quarterfinals)
11. (South Africa) Maryna Godwin (third round)
12. (West Germany) Helga Schultze (quarterfinals)
13. (Czechoslovakia) Jitka Volavková (third round)
14. (Australia) Robyn Ebbern (first round)
15. (Australia) Gail Sherriff (fourth round)
16. (South Africa) Glenda Swan (fourth round)

== Draw ==
=== Key ===
- Q = Qualifier
- WC = Wild card
- LL = Lucky loser
- r = Retired

=== Finals ===
Quarterfinals
1 | (Australia) Margaret Smith | 6 | 6
(United States) Julie Heldman | 2 | 2
4 | (South Africa) Annette Van Zyl | 6 | 3 | 2
5 | (United States) Nancy Richey | 3 | 6 | 6
12 | (West Germany) Helga Schultze | 4 | 4
3 | (United Kingdom) Ann Jones | 6 | 6
10 | (France) Françoise Dürr | 6 | 4 | 4
2 | (Brazil) Maria Bueno | 3 | 6 | 6

Semifinals
1 | (Australia) Margaret Smith | 1 | 3
5 | (United States) Nancy Richey | 6 | 6
3 | (United Kingdom) Ann Jones | 4 | 8 | 6
2 | (Brazil) Maria Bueno | 6 | 6 | 3

Finals
5 | (United States) Nancy Richey | 3 | 1
3 | (United Kingdom) Ann Jones | 6 | 6

=== Earlier rounds ===
==== Section 1 ====
First round

Second round
1 | (Australia) Smith | 6 | 6
(Spain) Solsona | 0 | 0
(France) Nay | 5 | 6
(Canada) Brown | 7 | 8
(France) Langanay | 1 | 3
16 | (South Africa) Swan | 6 | 6
(West Germany) Niessen
(France) de Roubin

Third round
1 | (Australia) Smith | 6 | 6
(Canada) Brown | 2 | 0
16 | (South Africa) Swan | 7 | 6
(France) de Roubin | 5 | 0

Fourth round
1 | (Australia) Smith | 6 | 6
16 | (South Africa) Swan | 3 | 3

==== Section 2 ====
First round

Second round
(Sweden) Andersson | 0 | 4
8 | (West Germany) Buding | 6 | 6
(France) Cristiani | 4 | 2
(Soviet Union) Baksheeva | 6 | 6
9 | (Argentina) Giscafré | 6 | 3 | 3
(France) Venturino | 2 | 6 | 6
(South Africa) Delport | 4 | 1
(United States) Heldman | 6 | 6

Third round
8 | (West Germany) Buding | 8 | 3 | 6
(Soviet Union) Baksheeva | 6 | 6 | 3
(France) Venturino | 1 | 0
(United States) Heldman | 6 | 6

Fourth round
8 | (West Germany) Buding | 5 | 1
(United States) Heldman | 7 | 6

==== Section 3 ====
First round
(Australia) Vanharen
(France) Darmon
13 | (Czechoslovakia) Volavková
(Belgium) Loeys
(West Germany) Schultze | 4 | 4
(Canada) Martin | 6 | 6
(Spain) Aubet | 2 | 1
(Argentina) Baylon | 6 | 6
(France) Nenot | 2 | 4
(Australia) Schacht | 6 | 6

Second round
4 | (South Africa) Van Zyl | 6 | 6
(Australia) Harris | 2 | 1
(United Kingdom) Maclennan | 6 | 6
(France) Darmon | 2 | 2
13 | (Czechoslovakia) Volavková | 6 | 6
(Canada) Martin | 1 | 1
(Argentina) Baylon | 10 | 6
(Australia) Schacht | 8 | 3

Third round
4 | (South Africa) Van Zyl | 10 | 6
(United Kingdom) Maclennan | 8 | 0
13 | (Czechoslovakia) Volavková | 3 | 1
(Argentina) Baylon | 6 | 6

Fourth round
4 | (South Africa) Van Zyl | 6 | 2 | 8
(Argentina) Baylon | 3 | 6 | 6

==== Section 4 ====
First round
5 | (United States) Richey | 6 | 6
(Spain) Cuadrado | 1 | 3
(Soviet Union) Islanova | 3 | 2
(Italy) Gordigiani | 6 | 6
(Argentina) Moran | 3 | 6 | 3
(France) Terras | 6 | 3 | 6
(Sweden) Lundqvist | 4 | 5
(South Africa) Walkden | 6 | 7
(Sweden) Löfdahl | 3 | 5
(France) Burel | 6 | 7
(United States) Tym
(Australia) Blackman
(Australia) Hopman | 1 | 2
(South Africa) Rossouw | 6 | 6
(Australia) Melville | 1 | 4
(Italy) Beltrame | 6 | 6

Second round
5 | (United States) Richey | 6 | 6
(Italy) Gordigiani | 0 | 1
(France) Terras | 1 | 2
(South Africa) Walkden | 6 | 6
(France) Burel | 6 | 4 | 2
(Australia) Blackman | 2 | 6 | 6
(South Africa) Rossouw | 3 | 2
(Italy) Beltrame | 6 | 6

Third round
5 | (United States) Richey | 6 | 1 | 6
(South Africa) Walkden | 2 | 6 | 3
(Australia) Blackman | 6 | 6
(Italy) Beltrame | 3 | 4

Fourth round
5 | (United States) Richey | 1 | 6 | 6
(Australia) Blackman | 6 | 3 | 1

==== Section 5 ====
First round
12 | (West Germany) Schultze | 6 | 6
(Canada) Nunns | 1 | 1
(Sweden) Pegel | 2 | 2
(France) Rouchon | 6 | 6
(Ecuador) Guzman
(United States) Behlmar
(Australia) Sherriff | 3 | 6 | 3
11 | (South Africa) Godwin | 6 | 4 | 6
(France) Mizen | 5 | 0
(United States) Knode | 7 | 6
(Ecuador) Zuleta
(France) Tacchini
(Australia) Gourlay | 0 | 4
(South Africa) Emmanuel | 6 | 6
6 | (United States) Graebner
(France) Galtier

Second round
12 | (West Germany) Schultze | 6 | 6
(France) Rouchon | 2 | 3
(United States) Behlmar
11 | (South Africa) Godwin
(United States) Knode | 6 | 2 | 6
(France) Tacchini | 2 | 6 | 2
(South Africa) Emmanuel | 6 | 6
(France) Galtier | 0 | 3

Third round
12 | (West Germany) Schultze | 6 | 6 | 6
11 | (South Africa) Godwin | 8 | 3 | 4
(United States) Knode | 1 | 2
(South Africa) Emmanuel | 6 | 6

Fourth round
12 | (West Germany) Schultze | 7 | 6
(South Africa) Emmanuel | 5 | 4

==== Section 6 ====
First round
(Italy) Perna | 3 | 2
(France) Lieffrig | 6 | 6
(Colombia) Palacios | 0 | 1
(Australia) Toyne | 6 | 6
(France) Seghers | 2 | 2
(South Africa) Segal | 6 | 6
14 | (Australia) Ebbern
(United States) Habicht
(Italy) Giorgi | 1 | 1
(Australia) Krantzcke | 6 | 6
(France) Rees-Lewis | 4 | 6 | 2
(United States) Harter | 6 | 2 | 6

Second round
(France) Lieffrig | 6 | 10
(Australia) Toyne | 3 | 8
(South Africa) Segal | 6 | 7
(United States) Habicht | 2 | 5
(Australia) Krantzcke | 6 | 8 | 6
(United States) Harter | 1 | 10 | 2
(United Kingdom) Harrison | w/o
3 | (United Kingdom) Jones

Third round
(France) Lieffrig | 3 | 6 | 6
(South Africa) Segal | 6 | 4 | 3
(Australia) Krantzcke | 4 | 2
3 | (United Kingdom) Jones | 6 | 6

Fourth round
(France) Lieffrig | 0 | 0
3 | (United Kingdom) Jones | 6 | 6

==== Section 7 ====
First round

Second round
(Spain) Estalella | 1 | 3
(France) Spinoza | 6 | 6
(Canada) Berner | 0 | 2
10 | (France) Dürr | 6 | 6
(France) De Lansalut | 5 | 3
(Canada) Urban | 7 | 6
(United Kingdom) McAnally | 3 | 6
7 | (Australia) Tegart | 6 | 8

Third round
(France) Spinoza | 1 | 1
10 | (France) Dürr | 6 | 6
(Canada) Urban | 4 | 2
7 | (Australia) Tegart | 6 | 6

Fourth round
10 | (France) Dürr | 7 | 6
7 | (Australia) Tegart | 5 | 2

==== Section 8 ====
First round

Second round
(South Africa) Wiggill | 4 | 4
(France) Kermina | 6 | 6
(France) Seghers | 0 | 1
15 | (Australia) Sherriff | 6 | 6
(France) Rouire | 6 | 3 | 4
(Spain) Barril | 3 | 6 | 6
(Australia) Wilkinson | 0 | 0
2 | (Brazil) Bueno | 6 | 6

Third round
(France) Kermina | 2 | 3
15 | (Australia) Sherriff | 6 | 6
(Spain) Barril | 1 | 1
2 | (Brazil) Bueno | 6 | 6

Fourth round
15 | (Australia) Sherriff | 4 | 6 | 1
2 | (Brazil) Bueno | 6 | 3 | 6

| Preceded by 1966 Australian Championships – Women's singles | Grand Slam women's singles | Succeeded by 1966 Wimbledon Championships – Women's singles |
