= Natanya International Invitation =

Defunct tennis tournament
- Tour: ILTF World Circuit (1967–1969) men (1967–1971) women ILTF Independent Circuit (1970–1971) men
- Founded: 1967; 59 years ago
- Abolished: 1971; 55 years ago
- Location: Netanya, Israel
- Venue: Natanya Tennis Club
- Surface: Hard / outdoor
- Website: Natanya Tennis Club

The Natanya International Invitation was a men's and women's hard court tennis tournament founded in 1967. The tournament was played at the Natanya Tennis Club, Netanya, Israel until 1971.

== Finals ==
=== Men's singles ===
(incomplete roll)

Year	Winners	Runners-up	Score
↓ ILTF World Circuit ↓
1967	(Greece) Nicholas Kalogeropoulos	(Israel) Eleazar Davidman	4–6, 6–4, 6–1.
1968	(Canada) Peter Burwash	(Australia) Doug Smith	5–7, 6–2, 6–3.
↓ Open Era ↓
1969	(Austria) Hans Kary	(New Zealand) Jeff Simpson	6–3, 7–9, 8–6.
↓ ILTF Independent Circuit ↓
1970	(West Germany) Uwe Gottschalk	(South Africa) Julian Krinsky	3–6, 6–3, 7–5.
1971	(Romania) Petre Mărmureanu	(Israel) Yehoshua Shalem	6–4, 6–4.

=== Women's singles ===
(incomplete roll)

Year	Winners	Runners-up	Score
↓ ILTF World Circuit ↓
1967	(United States) Alice Tym	(Israel) Tamar Hayat	6–4, 5–7, 6–1
1968	(United States) Nadine Netter	(South Africa) Laura Rossouw	3–6, retd.
↓ Open Era ↓
1969	(Czechoslovakia) Alena Palmeova	(Israel) Tova Epstein	2–6, 6–3, 6–3
1970	(Romania) Judith Dibar	(Australia) Helen Amos	6–4, 6–1
1971	(Czechoslovakia) Alena Palmeova (2)	(Canada) Andrée Martin	6–3, 6–4
