= 1971 Federation Cup (tennis) =

International women's tennis competition

Details
- Duration: 26 – 29 December 1970
- Edition: 9th

Champion
- Winning nation: Australia

The 1971 Federation Cup was the ninth edition of what is now known as the Billie Jean King Cup. 14 nations participated in the tournament, which was held at the Royal King's Park Tennis Club in Perth, Western Australia, from 26–29 December 1970. Australia defended their title, defeating Great Britain in the final, and winning the title without losing a rubber.

== Participating teams ==
Participating Teams
Argentina	Australia	Canada	France	Great Britain	Indonesia	Italy
Japan	Netherlands	New Zealand	Rhodesia	South Africa	United States	Yugoslavia

== Draw ==
All ties were played at the Royal King's Park Tennis Club in Perth, Australia on grass courts.

First Round; 26 December 1970
Yugoslavia
Rhodesia	w/o
France	2
Japan	1
Canada	0
Netherlands	3
South Africa	3
Indonesia	0
Italy	0
United States	3
Argentina	0
New Zealand	3

Quarterfinals; 27 December 1970
Australia
Yugoslavia	w/o
France	2
Netherlands	1
United States	2
South Africa	1
New Zealand	0
Great Britain	3

Semifinals; 28 December 1970
Australia	3
France	0
United States	0
Great Britain	3

Final; 29 December 1970
Australia	3
Great Britain	0

=== First round ===
France vs. Japan

France
2
Royal King's Park Tennis Club, Perth, Australia
26 December 1970
Grass

Japan
1

			1	2	3
1	(France) (Japan)	Françoise Dürr; Kimiyo Hatanaka	6; 2	6; 2
2	(France) (Japan)	Gail Chanfreau; Kazuko Sawamatsu	6; 8	6; 4	2; 6
3	(France) (Japan)	Gail Chanfreau / Françoise Dürr; Junko Sawamatsu / Kazuko Sawamatsu	6; 3	6; 1

Canada vs. Netherlands

Canada
0
Royal King's Park Tennis Club, Perth, Australia
26 December 1970
Grass

Netherlands
3

			1	2	3
1	(Canada) (Netherlands)	Jane O'Hara; Gertruida Walhof	2; 6	4; 6
2	(Canada) (Netherlands)	Andrée Martin; Betty Stöve	1; 6	2; 6
3	(Canada) (Netherlands)	Susan Butt / Andrée Martin; Betty Stöve / Gertruida Walhof	2; 6	2; 6

South Africa vs. Indonesia

South Africa
2
Royal King's Park Tennis Club, Perth, Australia
26 December 1970
Grass

Indonesia
1

			1	2	3
1	(South Africa) (Indonesia)	Laura Rossouw; Lany Kaligis	6; 2	7; 5
2	(South Africa) (Indonesia)	Brenda Kirk; Lita Liem	8; 6	2; 6	6; 4
3	(South Africa) (Indonesia)	Brenda Kirk / Laura Rossouw; Lany Kaligis / Lita Liem	6; 2	6; 3

Italy vs. United States

Italy
0
Royal King's Park Tennis Club, Perth, Australia
26 December 1970
Grass

United States
3

			1	2	3
1	(Italy) (United States)	Daniela Porzio; Sharon Walsh	6; 3	2; 6	2; 6
2	(Italy) (United States)	Anna-Maria Nasuelli; Patti Hogan	2; 6	0; 6
3	(Italy) (United States)	Anna-Maria Nasuelli / Daniela Porzio; Patti Hogan / Sharon Walsh	2; 6	3; 6

Argentina vs. New Zealand

Argentina
0
Royal King's Park Tennis Club, Perth, Australia
26 December 1970
Grass

New Zealand
3

			1	2	3
1	(Argentina) (New Zealand)	Inés Roget; Robyn Legge	4; 6	9; 11
2	(Argentina) (New Zealand)	Raquel Giscafré; Marilyn Pryde	7; 9	3; 6
3	(Argentina) (New Zealand)	Raquel Giscafré / Inés Roget; Robyn Legge / Marilyn Pryde	6; 4	6; 8	4; 6

=== Quarterfinals ===
France vs. Netherlands

France
2
Royal King's Park Tennis Club, Perth, Australia
27 December 1970
Grass

Netherlands
1

			1	2	3
1	(France) (Netherlands)	Françoise Dürr; Gertruida Walhof	8; 6	6; 3
2	(France) (Netherlands)	Gail Chanfreau; Betty Stöve	4; 6	6; 3	8; 10
3	(France) (Netherlands)	Gail Chanfreau / Françoise Dürr; Betty Stöve / Gertruida Walhof	6; 3	6; 3

South Africa vs. United States

South Africa
1
Royal King's Park Tennis Club, Perth, Australia
27 December 1970
Grass

United States
2

			1	2	3
1	(South Africa) (United States)	Laura Rossouw; Sharon Walsh	9; 7	5; 7	6; 4
2	(South Africa) (United States)	Brenda Kirk; Patti Hogan	1; 6	2; 6
3	(South Africa) (United States)	Brenda Kirk / Laura Rossouw; Patti Hogan / Sharon Walsh	3; 6	5; 7

New Zealand vs. Great Britain

New Zealand
0
Royal King's Park Tennis Club, Perth, Australia
27 December 1970
Grass

Great Britain
3

			1	2	3
1	(New Zealand) (United Kingdom)	Robyn Legge; Virginia Wade	1; 6	4; 6
2	(New Zealand) (United Kingdom)	Marilyn Pryde; Ann Jones	4; 6	1; 6
3	(New Zealand) (United Kingdom)	Robyn Legge / Marilyn Pryde; Ann Jones / Virginia Wade	4; 6	1; 6

=== Semifinals ===
Australia vs. France

Australia
3
Royal King's Park Tennis Club, Perth, Australia
28 December 1970
Grass

France
0

			1	2	3
1	(Australia) (France)	Margaret Court; Gail Chanfreau	6; 1	6; 1
2	(Australia) (France)	Evonne Goolagong; Françoise Dürr	6; 3	3; 6	6; 0
3	(Australia) (France)	Margaret Court / Evonne Goolagong; Gail Chanfreau / Françoise Dürr	6; 2	6; 3

United States vs. Great Britain

United States
0
Royal King's Park Tennis Club, Perth, Australia
28 December 1970
Grass

Great Britain
3

			1	2	3
1	(United States) (United Kingdom)	Sharon Walsh; Virginia Wade	5; 7	4; 6
2	(United States) (United Kingdom)	Patti Hogan; Ann Jones	3; 6	5; 7
3	(United States) (United Kingdom)	Patti Hogan / Sharon Walsh; Ann Jones / Virginia Wade	4; 6	2; 6

=== Final ===
Australia vs. Great Britain

Australia
3
Royal King's Park Tennis Club, Perth, Australia
29 December 1970
Grass

Great Britain
0

			1	2	3
1	(Australia) (United Kingdom)	Evonne Goolagong; Virginia Wade	6; 4	6; 1
2	(Australia) (United Kingdom)	Margaret Court; Ann Jones	6; 8	6; 3	6; 3
3	(Australia) (United Kingdom)	Margaret Court / Lesley Hunt; Winnie Shaw / Virginia Wade	6; 4	6; 4

== Consolation Round ==
=== Draw ===
Consolation First Round; 27 December 1970
Italy	1
Canada	2

Consolation Semifinals; 28 December 1970
Japan	3
Argentina	0
Indonesia	2
Canada	1

Consolation Final; 29 December 1970
Japan	2
Indonesia	1

=== First round ===
Canada vs. Italy

Canada
2
Royal King's Park Tennis Club, Perth, Australia
27 December 1970
Grass

Italy
1

			1	2	3
1	(Canada) (Italy)	Jane O'Hara; Daniela Porzio	6; 4	6; 1
2	(Canada) (Italy)	Andrée Martin; Anna-Maria Nasuelli	6; 4	4; 6	5; 7
3	(Canada) (Italy)	Andrée Martin / Jane O'Hara; Anna-Maria Nasuelli / Daniela Porzio	6; 2	6; 3

=== Semifinals ===
Japan vs. Argentina

Japan
3
Royal King's Park Tennis Club, Perth, Australia
28 December 1970
Grass

Argentina
0

			1	2	3
1	(Japan) (Argentina)	Kazuko Sawamatsu; Raquel Giscafré	6; 1	6; 1
2	(Japan) (Argentina)	Kimiyo Hatanaka; Inés Roget	6; 2	2; 6	6; 3
3	(Japan) (Argentina)	Junko Sawamatsu / Kazuko Sawamatsu; Raquel Giscafré / Inés Roget	6; 3	4; 6	6; 2

Indonesia vs. Canada

Indonesia
2
Royal King's Park Tennis Club, Perth, Australia
28 December 1970
Grass

Canada
1

			1	2	3
1	(Indonesia) (Canada)	Lany Kaligis; Jane O'Hara	6; 1	2; 6	4; 6
2	(Indonesia) (Canada)	Lita Liem; Andrée Martin	6; 3	6; 1
3	(Indonesia) (Canada)	Lany Kaligis / Lita Liem; Andrée Martin / Jane O'Hara	6; 1	6; 3

=== Final ===
Japan vs. Indonesia'

Japan
2
Royal King's Park Tennis Club, Perth, Australia
29 December 1970
Grass

Indonesia
1

			1	2	3
1	(Japan) (Indonesia)	Kazuko Sawamatsu; Lita Liem	6; 3	7; 5
2	(Japan) (Indonesia)	Kimiyo Hatanaka; Lany Kaligis	2; 6	2; 6
3	(Japan) (Indonesia)	Kimiyo Hatanaka / Kazuko Sawamatsu; Lany Kaligis / Lita Liem	6; 3	6; 3
