= Zaiga =

- Gender: Female
- Name day: July 9

Origin
- Origin: From zaigot, "to glisten"
- Region of origin: Latvia

Zaiga is a Latvian feminine given name, which means "to glisten". The name may refer to:

- Zaiga Jansone (born 1951), Latvian tennis player and coach
