= Daphne Botha =

South African tennis player

- Full name: Daphne Hazel Botha
- Country (sports): South Africa; Rhodesia
- Born: 12 June 1948 (age 76)

Singles

Grand Slam singles results
- French Open: 1R (1971, 1973)
- Wimbledon: 2R (1971, 1972)

Doubles

Grand Slam doubles results
- French Open: 1R (1973)
- Wimbledon: 2R (1971, 1972)
- US Open: 1R (1972, 1973)

Grand Slam mixed doubles results
- Wimbledon: 3R (1972)
- US Open: 2R (1972)

Daphne Hazel Botha (born 12 June 1948) is a South African former professional tennis player.

Raised in Orange Free State, Botha married tennis player Andrew Pattison in 1971, after which she represented her husband's country of Rhodesia on tour.

Botha made the singles second round at Wimbledon twice, registering main draw wins over Marie Neumannová and Glynis Coles. Her only third round appearance came in mixed doubles, with husband Andrew in 1972.

In the 1972 Federation Cup she represented Rhodesia in the competition for the only time and played in three ties, including a World Group first round fixture against the United States.

Botha was signed by World TeamTennis team Denver Racquets in 1974.
