= Yelena Granaturova =

Soviet tennis player

- Country (sports): Soviet Union
- Born: 24 April 1953 (age 71); Russia, Soviet Union
- Turned pro: 1970
- Retired: 1979
- Plays: Right-handed

Singles
- Career titles: 3

Grand Slam singles results
- Wimbledon: 1R (1975)

Doubles
- Career titles: 1

Yelena Grigoryevna Granaturova (Russian: Елен́а Григо́рьевна Гранату́рова, IPA: [ɪ̯ɪlʲɪˈna ɡrʲɪˈɡorʲɪ̯ɪvnə ɡrənɐˈturəvə]; born 24 April 1953) is a former tennis player who competed for the Soviet Union. Her sister Irina is also a coach, with Vera Dushevina being her most famous player.

In 1971 she won the French Open junior title by defeating French Florence Guédy in the final.

At Grand Slam level she played the first round at Wimbledon in 1975. Lost to Australian Kerry Reid. In 1974 at the VI european amateur tennis championship played in the doubles final with her partner Natasha Chmyreva.

== WTA finals ==
=== Singles: 1 (1 runner-ups) ===
| Result | No. | Date | Tournament | Surface | Opponent | Score |
|---|---|---|---|---|---|---|
| Loss | 1. | Jan 1975 | Moscow, Soviet Union | Hard (i) | (Soviet Union) Olga Morozova | 0–6, 6–1, 4–6 |

=== Doubles: 1 (1 runner-ups) ===
| Result | No. | Date | Tournament | Surface | Partner | Opponents | Score |
|---|---|---|---|---|---|---|---|
| Loss | 1. | Feb 1971 | Moscow, Soviet Union | Carpet (i) | (Soviet Union) Olga Morozova | (Soviet Union) Eugenia Birioukova (Soviet Union) Marina Kroschina | 6–7, 7–5, 5–7 |

== Career finals ==
=== Singles: 9 (3–6) ===
| Result | No. | Date | Tournament | Surface | Opponent | Score |
|---|---|---|---|---|---|---|
| Win | 1. | 8 February 1971 | Sievierodonetsk, Soviet Union | Hard (i) | (Soviet Union) Eugenia Isopaitis | 6–4, 3–6, 6–2 |
| Loss | 1. | 1 April 1971 | Alexandria, Egypt | Clay | (Czechoslovakia) Alena Palmeová-West | 4–6, 4–6 |
| Loss | 2. | 17 April 1973 | Tashkent, Soviet Union | Hard | (Soviet Union) Marina Kroschina | 4–6, 2–6 |
| Loss | 3. | 10 February 1974 | Salavat, Soviet Union | Hard (i) | (Soviet Union) Olga Morozova | 4–6, 6–4, 2–6 |
| Loss | 4. | 17 April 1974 | Tashkent, Soviet Union | Hard | (Soviet Union) Marina Kroschina | 4–6, 5–7 |
| Loss | 5. | 18 July 1974 | Moscow, Soviet Union | Hard | (Soviet Union) Marina Kroschina | 7–5, 3–6, 3–6 |
| Win | 2. | 9 March 1975 | Cairo, Egypt | Clay | (West Germany) Iris Riedel-Kühn | 6–4, 1–6, 6–3 |
| Win | 3. | 7 March 1976 | Cairo, Egypt | Clay | (Soviet Union) Lydia Zinkevich | 0–6, 6–0, 6–1 |
| Loss | 6. | 25 July 1978 | Moscow, Soviet Union | Clay | (Soviet Union) Natasha Chmyreva | 4–6, 6–1, 6–8 |

=== Doubles: 5 (1–4) ===
| Result | No. | Date | Tournament | Surface | Partner | Opponents | Score |
|---|---|---|---|---|---|---|---|
| Loss | 1. | 11 July 1973 | Moscow, Soviet Union | Hard | (Soviet Union) Eugenia Isopaitis | (Soviet Union) Marina Chuvyrina (Soviet Union) Tatiana Lagoiskaya | 1–6, 6–3, 3–6 |
| Loss | 2. | 17 April 1974 | Tashkent, Soviet Union | Hard | (Soviet Union) Marina Kroschina | (Soviet Union) Natasha Chmyreva (Soviet Union) Svetlana Korzun | 1–6, 6–8 |
| Win | 1. | 18 July 1974 | Moscow, Soviet Union | Hard | (Soviet Union) Eugenia Birioukova | (Soviet Union) Svetlana Korzun (Soviet Union) Marina Kroschina | 6–3, 6–2 |
| Loss | 3. | 4 August 1974 | Wrocław, Soviet Union | Clay | (Soviet Union) Natasha Chmyreva | (Soviet Union) Marina Kroschina (Soviet Union) Olga Morozova | 2–6, 0–6 |
| Loss | 4. | 25 July 1978 | Moscow, Soviet Union | Clay | (Soviet Union) Marina Kroschina | (Soviet Union) Natasha Chmyreva (Soviet Union) Elena Eliseenko | 0–6, 4–6 |

== Junior Grand Slam titles ==
=== Girls' singles: 1 title ===
| Result | Year | Tournament | Surface | Opponent | Score |
|---|---|---|---|---|---|
| Win | 1971 | French Open | Clay | (France) Florence Guédy | 2–6, 6–4, 7–5 |
