= Elizabeth Ernest-James =

Welsh tennis player

- Country (sports): Great Britain
- Born: 15 May 1946 (age 79)

Singles

Grand Slam singles results
- Wimbledon: 2R (1970, 1971)

Doubles

Grand Slam doubles results
- Wimbledon: 1R (1967, 1969, 1970, 1971)

Grand Slam mixed doubles results
- Wimbledon: 3R (1970)

Elizabeth Ernest-James (born 15 May 1946) is a Welsh former professional tennis player.

Ernest-James is the daughter of tennis player Barbara Ernest, who competed at Wimbledon in the 1950s. Like her mother, Ernest-James made several appearances at Wimbledon, twice playing in the singles second round.

In April 2022 Ernest-James appeared, with a collection of tennis dresses, on BBC's Antiques Roadshow.
