= Alena Palmeová-West =

Czech former professional tennis player (born 1945)

- Full name: Alena Palmeová-West
- Country (sports): Czechoslovakia
- Born: 7 January 1945 (age 80); Jihlava, Protectorate of Bohemia and Moravia

Singles
- Career titles: 11

Grand Slam singles results
- French Open: 2R (1971)
- Wimbledon: 3R (1969, 1971)
- US Open: 2R (1971)

Doubles
- Career titles: 1

Grand Slam doubles results
- French Open: 3R (1970)
- Wimbledon: 1R (1970, 1974)
- US Open: 1R (1971)

Mixed doubles

Grand Slam mixed doubles results
- US Open: 1R (1971)

Alena Palmeová-West (born 7 January 1945) is a Czech former professional tennis player.

== Biography ==
Palmeová born in 1945 in Jihlava. She married American William Sidney West on July 17, 1970, divorced 1984. After the wedding she played under the name Alena Palmeová-West.

== Career ==
Palmeová won 11 international tournaments in singles and played in the finals in 19 tournaments. In doubles, she won one tournament and played in the finals in two tournaments. At Grand Slam level she was most successful at Wimbledon, making the third round of the Wimbledon in both 1969 and 1971.

Playing for Czechoslovakia at the Federation Cup, Palmeová has a win–loss record of 2–4.

== Career finals ==
=== Singles (11 titles – 19 runner–ups) ===
Result	W–L	Date	Tournament	Surface	Opponent	Score
Win	1–0	Aug 1964	Budapest, Hungary	Clay	(China) Tsu Sun Tsen	4–6, 6–3, 6–1
Loss	1–1	Sep 1966	Belgrade, Yugoslavia	Clay	(Soviet Union) Anna Dmitrieva	2–6, 4–6
Loss	1–2	Sep 1967	Bratislava, Czechoslovakia	Clay	(Czechoslovakia) Vlasta Vopičková	3–6, 2–6
Win	2–2	Jun 1968	Leverkusen, West Germany	Clay	(West Germany) Almut Sturm	6–2, 6–2
Loss	2–3	Jul 1968	Travemünde, West Germany	Clay	(Australia) Gail Chanfreau	4–6, 4–6
Loss	2–4	May 1969	Leverkusen, West Germany	Clay	(West Germany) Helga Niessen Masthoff	2–6, 5–7
Loss	2–5	Sep 1969	Beersheeba, Israel	Hard	(United Kingdom) Sally Holdsworth	6–4, 4–6, 1–6
Loss	2–6	Sep 1969	Netanya, Israel	Hard	(United Kingdom) Sally Holdsworth	6–3, 1–6, 3–6
Win	3–6	Oct 1969	Tel Aviv, Israel	Hard	(United Kingdom) Sally Holdsworth	6–1, 6–3
Loss	3–7	Apr 1970	Charlotte, United States	Clay	(United States) Nancy Richey	0–6, 0–6
Win	4–7	Apr 1971	Alexandria, Egypt	Clay	(Soviet Union) Yelena Granaturova	6–4, 6–4
Win	5–7	Apr 1971	Netanya, Israel	Hard	(Canada) Andrée Martin	6–3, 6–4
Win	6–7	Mar 1972	Alexandria, Egypt	Clay	(France) Nathalie Fuchs	6–1, 6–2
Loss	6–8	Apr 1972	Montana, Switzerland	Clay	(Australia) Lesley Hunt	1–6, 0–6
Loss	6–9	Apr 1972	Madrid, Spain	Clay	(United States) Linda Tuero	3–6, 1–6
Win	7–9	May 1972	Terrassa, Spain	Clay	(New Zealand) Marilyn Pryde	6–3, 6–4
Loss	7–10	May 1972	Stuttgart, West Germany	Clay	(United States) Linda Tuero	1–6, 4–6
Loss	7–11	Jul 1972	Fulda, West Germany	Clay	(West Germany) Heide Orth	0–6, 0–6
Win	8–11	Aug 1972	Grado, Italy	Clay	(Chile) Michelle Rodríguez	6–3, 6–3
Loss	8–12	Oct 1972	Hong Kong	Carpet (i)	(Japan) Kazuko Sawamatsu	2–6, 3–6
Loss	8–13	Nov 1972	Tokyo, Japan	Carpet (i)	(Japan) Kazuko Sawamatsu	3–6, 0–6
Win	9–13	Jul 1973	Davos, Switzerland	Clay	(France) Danièle Bouteleux	3–6, 7–6, 6–1
Loss	9–14	Aug 1973	Geneva, Switzerland	Clay	(Italy) Lucia Bassi	3–6, 1–6
Loss	9–15	Aug 1973	Brummana, Lebanon	Clay	(Argentina) Raquel Giscafré	4–6, 7–9
Loss	9–16	May 1974	Stuttgart, West Germany	Clay	(Romania) Virginia Ruzici	6–3, 4–6, 5–7
Win	10–16	Jul 1974	Montana, Switzerland	Clay	(Italy) Lucia Bassi	7–6, 6–4
Loss	10–17	Aug 1974	İstanbul, Turkey	Clay	(Argentina) Raquel Giscafré	1–6, 3–6
Loss	10–18	Jul 1975	Travemünde, West Germany	Clay	(West Germany) Helga Niessen Masthoff	4–6, 4–6
Loss	10–19	Jul 1975	Montana, Switzerland	Clay	(South Africa) Linky Boshoff	6–7, 2–6
Win	11–19	Aug 1975	Geneva, Switzerland	Clay	(Switzerland) Marianne Kindler	6–3, 6–2

=== Doubles (2 titles, 3 runner–ups) ===
Result	W–L	Date	Tournament	Surface	Partner	Opponents	Score
Win	1–0	Jul 1964	Ostrava, Czechoslovakia	Clay	(Czechoslovakia) Olga Lendlová	(Czechoslovakia) Vlasta Kodešová (Czechoslovakia) Jitka Volavková	6–2, 8–6
Loss	1–1	Aug 1965	Kitzbühel, Austria	Clay	(Czechoslovakia) Jitka Volavková	(South Africa) Annette Van Zyl (Australia) Gail Chanfreau	1–6, 0–6
Loss	1–2	Jul 1966	Ostrava, Czechoslovakia	Clay	(Czechoslovakia) Olga Lendlová	(Czechoslovakia) Vlasta Kodešová (Czechoslovakia) Jitka Volavková	6–1, 3–6, 10–12
Loss	1–3	Oct 1972	Hong Kong	Carpet (i)	(United Kingdom) Frances Taylor	(Japan) Hideko Goto (Japan) Kazuko Sawamatsu	2–6, 3–6
Win	2–3	Jul 1974	Montana, Switzerland	Clay	(Italy) Lucia Bassi	(Australia) Judy Connor (United Kingdom) Lynn Cooper	7–6, 6–4
