= Tennis at the 1977 Summer Universiade =

Tennis events were contested at the 1977 Summer Universiade in Sofia, Bulgaria.

== Medal summary ==
Event	Gold	Silver	Bronze
Men's singles	Tomáš Šmíd (TCH)	Balázs Taróczy (HUN)	Vadim Borisov (URS)
Men's doubles	Pavel Složil and Tomáš Šmíd (TCH)	Thomas Emmrich and Andreas John (GDR)	Bozhidar Pampulov and Matei Pampulov (BUL)
Women's singles	Marina Kroshina (URS)	Renáta Tomanová (TCH)	Eugenia Birioukova (URS)
Women's doubles	Florența Mihai and Virginia Ruzici (ROU)	Yvona Brzáková and Renáta Tomanová (TCH)	Eugenia Birioukova and Marina Kroshina (URS)
Mixed doubles	Renáta Tomanová and Pavel Složil (TCH)	Virginia Ruzici and Dumitru Hărădău (ROU)	Eugenia Birioukova and Ramiz Akhmerov (URS)

== Medal table ==
Rank	Nation	Gold	Silver	Bronze	Total
1	Czechoslovakia (TCH)	3	2	0	5
2	Romania (ROU)	1	1	0	2
3	Soviet Union (URS)	1	0	4	5
4	East Germany (GDR)	0	1	0	1
4	Hungary (HUN)	0	1	0	1
6	Bulgaria (BUL)	0	0	1	1
Totals (6 entries)		5	5	5	15

== See also ==
- Tennis at the Summer Universiade
