= Zaiga Jansone =

Soviet-Latvian tennis player and tennis coach

Zaiga Jansone-Ivanova
- Country (sports): Soviet Union
- Residence: Jūrmala, Latvia
- Born: 24 January 1951 (age 75) Rīga, Latvian SSR, Soviet Union
- Turned pro: 1968
- Retired: 1974

Singles

Grand Slam singles results
- French Open: 2R (1969)
- Wimbledon: 4R (1971)

Doubles
- Career titles: 11 ITF

Grand Slam doubles results
- French Open: 2R (1969)
- Wimbledon: 2R (1969, 1971)
Medal record
Representing Soviet Union
Summer Universiade
Gold medal – first place	1973 Moscow	Doubles

Zaiga Jansone-Ivanova (born 24 January 1951) is a former Soviet Latvian tennis player and tennis coach. She was a five-time Soviet champion in women's doubles, 1973 Summer Universiade champion in women's doubles (all with Olga Morozova) and winner of the exhibition tennis event of 1968 Olympics in mixed doubles (with Vladimir Korotkov).

== Biography ==
Zaiga Jansone was born in Riga in 1951. Her father Jānis was her first tennis coach, and in the following years she has also been coached by Serguey Andreev and future Russian Tennis Hall-of-famer Semyon Belits-Geiman. She was representing clubs Daugava (Riga), CSKA (Moscow) and ASK (Riga).

Zaiga's best years in tennis encompassed the late 1960s and early 1970s. In 1968 she won a gold medal at the exhibition tennis event at Mexico Olympics where she partnered with Vladimir Korotkov in mixed doubles. In the final game they defeated the German-American team Peaches Bartkowicz-Ingo Buding. She also was awarded a bronze medal in women's doubles in the same event despite not winning a single tie: she and her Mexican partner Cecilia Rosado did not have to play a quarterfinals game and received bronze medals by default as semifinalists despite losing in semifinals to the eventual champions Rosa Maria Darmon and Julie Heldman.

Between 1969 and 1973 Zaiga Jansone, paired with Olga Morozova, won the Soviet tennis championships in women's doubles five times in a row. In 1970 she also met Morozova in the singles finals but lost 4–6, 3–6. Between 1969 and 1973 Morozova and Zaiga (who by 1973 was playing under family name Jansone-Ivanova) also won the European amateur championships four times and 1973 Summer Universiade in women's doubles.

Jansone's best results in open tennis tournaments where amateurs could play against world's best professionals came in 1971. That year she reached 4th round at the Wimbledon Championships in singles (eventually losing to the sixth-seed Nancy Richey) as well as her only finals at an open event: she and Morozova lost in the finals of Kent Championships to Christine Janes and Nell Truman. Her best result in mixed doubles came also at Wimbledon Championships two years earlier when she and Sergei Likhachev lost in fourth round to Koji Watanabe and Kazuko Sawamatsu.

Zaiga Jansone-Ivanova graduated in 1981 from the Latvian State University where she was studying journalism but her further career was in coaching. She first coached at the Jūrmala Sports School and in 1993 started her own Zaiga Jansone-Ivanova Tennis School in the same city.

== WTA finals ==
=== Doubles (0-1) ===
Result	W-L	Date	Tournament	Surface	Partner	Opponent	Score
Loss	0–1	Jun 1971	Beckenham, United Kingdom	Grass	(Soviet Union) Olga Morozova	(United Kingdom) Christine Truman (United Kingdom) Nell Truman	3–6, 7–9

== ITF finals ==
=== Singles (0–2) ===
Result	No.	Date	Tournament	Surface	Opponent	Score
Loss	1.	1 December 1966	Karachi, Pakistan	Hard (i)	(Soviet Union) Galina Baksheeva	0–6, 0–6
Loss	2.	1 August 1972	Tallinn, Estonia	Clay	(Soviet Union) Olga Morozova	1–6, 0–6

=== Doubles (11–1) ===
Result	No.	Date	Tournament	Surface	Partner	Opponents	Score
Win	1.	23 February 1969	Moscow, Soviet Union	Hard	(Soviet Union) Olga Morozova	(Soviet Union) Tiiu Kivi (Soviet Union) Maria Kull	6–4, 8–6
Win	2.	17 August 1969	Moscow, Soviet Union	Hard	(Soviet Union) Olga Morozova	(Soviet Union) Galina Baksheeva (Soviet Union) Marina Chuvyrina	6–3, 6–2
Win	3.	21 September 1969	Turin, Italy	Hard	(Soviet Union) Olga Morozova	(Soviet Union) Marina Chuvyrina (Soviet Union) Tiiu Kivi	6–1, 4–6, 6–3
Win	4.	11 January 1970	Moscow, Soviet Union	Hard (i)	(Soviet Union) Olga Morozova	(Soviet Union) Anna Islanova (Soviet Union) Eugenia Isopaitis	6–2, 6–2
Win	5.	8 February 1970	Moscow, Soviet Union	Hard (i)	(Soviet Union) Olga Morozova	(Soviet Union) Tiiu Kivi (Soviet Union) Maria Kull	6–3, 6–4
Loss	6.	22 February 1970	Moscow, Soviet Union	Hard (i)	(Soviet Union) Olga Morozova	(United Kingdom) Nell Truman (United Kingdom) Joyce Williams	5–7, 5–7
Win	7.	27 February 1972	Moscow, Soviet Union	Hard (i)	(Soviet Union) Olga Morozova	(Soviet Union) Eugenia Birioukova (Soviet Union) Marina Kroschina	6–3, 5–7, 6–4
Win	8.	16 April 1972	Tashkent, Soviet Union	Hard	(Soviet Union) Olga Morozova	(Soviet Union) Eugenia Birioukova (Soviet Union) Marina Kroschina	5–7, 6–3, 11-9
Win	9.	1 August 1972	Tallinn, Estonia	Clay	(Soviet Union) Olga Morozova	(Soviet Union) Galina Baksheeva (Soviet Union) Anna Yeremeyeva	4–6, 6–3, 6–3
Win	10.	13 August 1972	Bucharest, Romania	Clay	(Soviet Union) Olga Morozova	(Soviet Union) Eugenia Birioukova (Soviet Union) Marina Kroschina	6–1, 6–1
Win	11.	19 August 1972	Moscow, Soviet Union	Clay	(Soviet Union) Olga Morozova	(Soviet Union) Eugenia Birioukova (Soviet Union) Marina Kroschina	4–6, 7–5, 7–5
Win	12.	12 February 1973	Baku, Soviet Union	Hard (i)	(Soviet Union) Olga Morozova	(Soviet Union) Galina Baksheeva (Soviet Union) Marina Chuvyrina	6–3, 6–1

== External sources ==
- Profile at the Latvian Olympic Committee official website (in Latvian)
- Zaiga Jansone at the International Tennis Federation
- Zaiga Jansone-Ivanova Tennis School at Latsports.lv
