= Kerry Melville =

Australian tennis player

Kerry Melville MBE
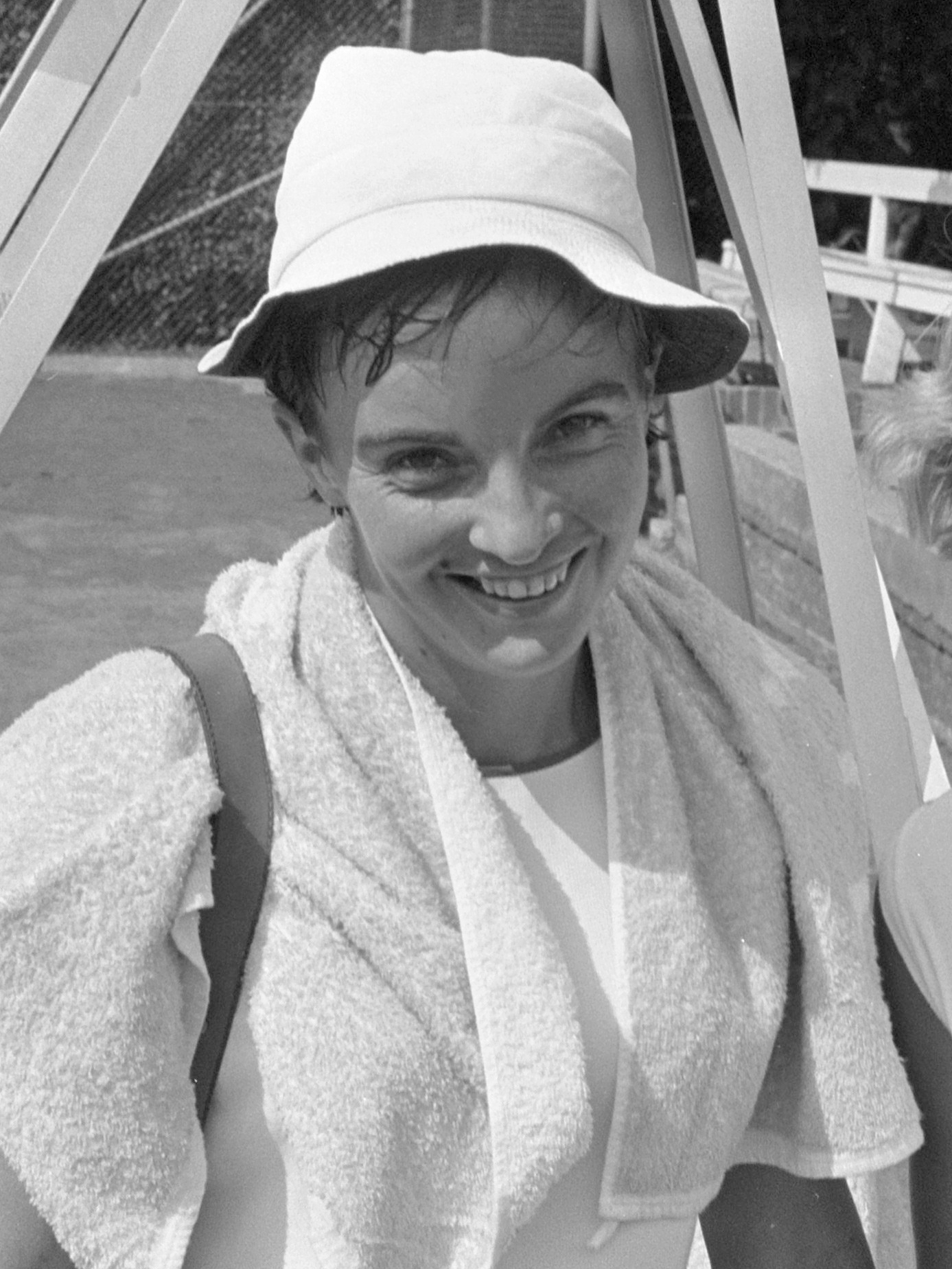
- Melville in 1970
- Full name: Kerry Melville Reid
- Country (sports): Australia
- Born: 7 August 1947 (age 78) Mosman, New South Wales
- Height: 167 cm (5 ft 6 in)
- Retired: 1979
- Plays: Right-handed (one-handed backhand)

Singles
- Career record: 236–104
- Career titles: 22
- Highest ranking: No. 7 (4 July 1976)

Grand Slam singles results
- Australian Open: W (1977^{Jan})
- French Open: SF (1967)
- Wimbledon: SF (1974)
- US Open: F (1972)

Doubles
- Career record: 172–64

Grand Slam doubles results
- Australian Open: W (1968, 1977^{Dec})
- Wimbledon: W (1978)
- US Open: F (1978)

Grand Slam mixed doubles results
- Australian Open: QF (1966)
- French Open: QF (1969)
- Wimbledon: QF (1977)
- US Open: QF (1966)

Kerry Melville Reid MBE (née Melville; born 7 August 1947) is an Australian former professional tennis player. During her 17-year career, Reid won a major singles title and 26 other singles titles, and was the runner-up in 40 singles tournaments. Reid was included in the year-end world top-ten rankings for 12 consecutive years (1968–1979). She won at least one tournament annually from 1966 through 1979, except for 1975. Her career-high ranking was world No. 5 in 1971, behind Margaret Court, Billie Jean King, Evonne Goolagong, and Rosie Casals.

== Career ==
Melville won 27 singles tournaments and was runner-up in 37 more between 1963 and 1979. Against Hall of Fame players, Melville beat Margaret Court three times, Billie Jean King eight times, Evonne Goolagong six times, Chris Evert twice, Martina Navratilova once, Rosie Casals 20 times, Francoise Durr 14 times, Nancy Richey eight times, Virginia Wade four times, Tracy Austin three times, and Hana Mandlikova twice. Overall, Reid played 1,047 matches from 1962 to 1985, with a win-loss record of 737 to 310 (70.4% winning ratio).

In January 1977, Reid won her sole Grand Slam singles title when she defeated fellow Australian Dianne Fromholtz in the final of the Australian Open in two sets. Reid and Fromholtz were the only top-ten players who played the tournament. The previous week, Reid also defeated Fromholtz in the final of the New South Wales Open, where Reid and Fromholtz again were the only top-ten players who entered.

Melville began her Grand Slam tennis career in 1963 when she reached the third round of the Australian Championships. In 1966, she reached the semifinals of both the Australian Championships and the U.S. Championships, defeating Billie Jean King in the second round of the latter tournament. In 1967, Melville again reached the semifinals of the Australian Championships and reached the semifinals of the French Championships for the first and only time.

Melville was the women's singles runner-up at the 1970 Australian Open, losing to Margaret Court in the final in straight sets. However, the Australian Tennis Federation banned Melville and fellow Australian Judy Tegart from playing the Australian Open in 1971 and 1972, owing to their roles in having started the Virginia Slims circuit. Melville was the singles runner-up at the US Open in 1972, losing to King after defeating Chris Evert in the semifinal in straight sets.

In 1972, Melville reached the final of the inaugural WTA Tour Championships, where she lost to Evert in two sets. Reid reached the semi's at the 1973 season-ending Virginia Slims Championship. In 1977, Reid played in both season-ending championships, the Virginia Slims Championships and the Colgate Series Championships, respectively, each limited to the top eight players. In 1978 and 1979, Reid was again among the eight who played in the year-end Colgate Series Championships.

Reid capped her last year on the professional tour in 1979 by beating Navratilova for the first time in tournament play. Reid defeated Navratilova in a Family Circle Cup semifinal in two sets, then lost to Tracy Austin in the final. Reid also competed in the year-ending WTA Championships (limited to the year's top 8 players).

Melville Reid won the Australian Open women's doubles title twice, outright in 1968 and shared in December 1977. With Wendy Turnbull in 1978, Reid won the women's doubles title at Wimbledon, was the doubles runner-up at the US Open and the year-ending Colgate Series Championship, and won the doubles titles at the Virginia Slims of Seattle, the Virginia Slims of Philadelphia, the U.S. Indoor Championships, and the New South Wales Open.

Melville was a member of the Australian team that won the Federation Cup in 1968. She also helped Australia reach four consecutive Federation Cup finals from 1976 through 1979 on a variety of court surfaces. During that run, she beat several top players, including Rosemary Casals (1976 final on carpet), Wade (1977 semifinal on grass in Eastbourne just weeks before Wade's Wimbledon victory), Austin (1978 final in Melbourne on grass) and Hana Mandlíková (1979 semifinal on clay).

Reid was a member of the "Houston 9", the breakaway group led by Gladys Heldman in 1971 that formed the nucleus of the women's professional tennis tour.

=== World TeamTennis ===
Reid anchored a World TeamTennis team for each season of its inaugural incarnation (Boston Lobsters 1974–1976 and San Diego Friars 1977–1978). In 1977, Reid was undefeated in singles against both Martina Navratilova and Virginia Wade, defeating each three times. As of 20 July 1978, Reid had "won the most games of any woman ever in WTT in women's singles. ... I think part of it is she's always been on teams where she's had the sole singles role. ... it's a longevity record." (Julie Heldman commentary with Vic Braden, HBO "Phoenix Racquets vs. San Diego Friars (20 July 1978)," 0.3:40 - 0:4:10 at https://www.youtube.com/watch?v=mcZebskRl3M)

== Personal life ==
She married Grover "Raz" Reid, a Boston Lobsters teammate, on 27 April 1975 in Greenville, South Carolina. Raz retired as a player in 1977 and coached Kerry during the remaining three years of her playing career. The Reids then retired to Raz's home state of South Carolina and raised two daughters.

== Honours and awards ==
Reid was made a Member of the Order of the British Empire by Queen Elizabeth II in 1979. In 2014, she was inducted into the Australian Tennis Hall of Fame. Reid was among the "Original Nine" inducted into the International Tennis Hall of Fame on 17 July 2021.

== Grand Slam tournament finals ==
=== Singles: 3 (1 title, 2 runner-ups) ===
Result	Year	Championship	Surface	Opponent	Score
Loss	1970	Australian Open	Grass	(Australia) Margaret Court	3–6, 1–6
Loss	1972	US Open	Grass	(United States) Billie Jean King	3–6, 5–7
Win	1977^{(J)}	Australian Open	Grass	(Australia) Dianne Fromholtz	7–5, 6–2

=== Doubles: 8 (3 titles, 5 runner-ups) ===
Result	Year	Championship	Surface	Partner	Opponents	Score
Win	1968	Australian Championships	Grass	(Australia) Karen Krantzcke	(Australia) Judy Tegart Dalton (Australia) Lesley Turner	6–4, 3–6, 6–2
Loss	1970	Australian Open	Grass	(Australia) Karen Krantzcke	(Australia) Margaret Court (Australia) Judy Tegart Dalton	3–6, 1–6
Loss	1973	Australian Open	Grass	(Australia) Kerry Harris	(Australia) Margaret Court (United Kingdom) Virginia Wade	4–6, 4–6
Loss	1974	Australian Open	Grass	(Australia) Kerry Harris	(Australia) Evonne Goolagong (United States) Peggy Michel	5–7, 3–6
Loss	1977^{(J)}	Australian Open	Grass	(United States) Betsy Nagelsen	(Australia) Helen Gourlay (Australia) Dianne Fromholtz	7–5, 1–6, 5–7
Win	1977^{(D)}	Australian Open	Grass	(United States) Mona Guerrant	(Australia) Evonne Goolagong (Australia) Helen Gourlay	title shared, final rained out
Win	1978	Wimbledon	Grass	(Australia) Wendy Turnbull	(Socialist Federal Republic of Yugoslavia) Mima Jaušovec (Romania) Virginia Ruzici	4–6, 9–8^{(12–10)}, 6–3
Loss	1978	US Open	Hard	(Australia) Wendy Turnbull	(United States) Billie Jean King (United States) Martina Navratilova	6–7, 4–6

== Grand Slam singles timeline ==
Key
W	F	SF	QF	#R	RR	Q#	DNQ	A	NH

(W) winner; (F) finalist; (SF) semifinalist; (QF) quarterfinalist; (#R) rounds 4, 3, 2, 1; (RR) round-robin stage; (Q#) qualification round; (DNQ) did not qualify; (A) absent; (NH) not held; (SR) strike rate (events won / competed); (W–L) win–loss record.

Tournament	1963	1964	1965	1966	1967	1968	1969	1970	1971	1972	1973	1974	1975	1976	1977^{1}		1978	1979	Career SR
Australian Open	3R	2R	3R	SF	SF	3R	SF	F	A	A	SF	SF	2R^{3}	1R	W	SF	A	A	1 / 14
French Open	A	A	A	1R	SF	4R	QF	1R^{2}	2R	2R	A	A	A	A	A		A	A	0 / 7
Wimbledon	A	A	A	3R	3R	3R	2R	4R	QF	3R	QF	SF	2R	QF	QF		4R	4R	0 / 14
US Open	A	A	A	SF	4R	A	1R	QF	SF	F	QF	QF	QF	2R	4R		4R	QF	0 / 13
SR	0 / 1	0 / 1	0 / 1	0 / 4	0 / 4	0 / 3	0 / 3	0 / 4	0 / 3	0 / 3	0 / 3	0 / 3	0 / 3	0 / 3	1 / 4		0 / 2	0 / 2	1 / 48
Year-end ranking													10	8	10		9	9	

^{1} The Australian Open was held twice in 1977, in January and December.
^{2,3} Melville did not play. Her opponent got a walkover.

== See also ==
- Performance timelines for all female tennis players since 1978 who reached at least one Grand Slam final
