= Jill Cooper (tennis) =

British tennis player

- Country (sports): United Kingdom
- Born: 14 April 1949 (age 76); Hamburg, Germany

Singles

Grand Slam singles results
- French Open: 2R (1970)
- Wimbledon: 3R (1970, 1972)
- US Open: 1R (1971)

Doubles

Grand Slam doubles results
- French Open: 2R (1970, 1971)
- Wimbledon: 2R (1969, 1971)
- US Open: 2R (1972)

Grand Slam mixed doubles results
- Wimbledon: 3R (1973)

Jill Cooper (born 14 April 1949) is a British former professional tennis player.

Cooper made her Wimbledon main draw debut in 1969 and played there every year up to 1973, twice reaching the third round.

At the 1970 French Open she was beaten in the second round by Billie Jean King. That year she also became British under-21 champion.

Her titles include the South of France Championships in 1971, which was the last edition of the tournament. She also won the East of England Championships in 1972 and the Scottish Championships in 1973.
