= Rauza Islanova =

Russian tennis player and coach

Rauza Mukhamedzhanovna Islanova (Russian: Рауза Мухамеджановна Исланова, IPA: [rɐˈuzə mʊxəmʲɪd͡ʐˈʐanəvnə ɪˈsɫanəvə]; born February 8, 1948, in Moscow, Russian SFSR, Soviet Union) is a prominent Russian tennis coach and former tennis player.

== Early life and career ==
External image
- Young Rauza preparing to hit backhand

Born in Moscow to Tatar parents, she grew up next to Sokolniki Park near the Spartak club, where many sports were offered. She first practiced figure skating, skiing and cycling before starting tennis at age 10. Her first coach was Klavdia Borisova. She was the Soviet champion in the 1965-1966 season for girls singles.

She attended State University of Physical Education (named State Central Order of Lenin Institute of Physical Education (SCOLIPE) at the time) and later received the rank of master in sports of international class (1976). During her tennis career, she played for the Spartak Tennis Club, and reached her highest seniors rank of the USSR in 1968, finishing fifth.

Trophies

- USSR Champion — girls' singles (1965-66)
- Champion of the Spartakiad [of the Peoples of the USSR] as part of the Moscow team (1967)
- Absolute champion (singles, doubles, mixed) of the Spartak Sports Society (1968)
- Winner of the USSR Cup as part of the Spartak team (1969)
- Champion of Moscow (1971) in singles and mixed doubles (with Shamil Tarpishchev)
- Champion of the All-Union Central Council of Trade Unions (1973) in singles and doubles

== Coaching ==
Since 1976, she has worked at the Spartak Tennis Club. She is well known as the mother and first coach of her two children Marat Safin and Dinara Safina, who both reached world No. 1.

She also coached Elena Dementieva, Anastasia Myskina, and Anna Kournikova during the very early years of their tennis careers.
