= Eugenia Birioukova =

Soviet professional tennis player

- Country (sports): Soviet Union
- Residence: Azerbaijan
- Born: 18 December 1952 (age 72); Baku, Soviet Union
- Plays: Right-handed

Singles

Grand Slam singles results
- Australian Open: 3R (1973)
- French Open: 1R (1973)
- Wimbledon: 2R (1972)
- US Open: 1R (1973)

Doubles
- Career titles: 2 WTA

Grand Slam doubles results
- Australian Open: QF (1973)
- French Open: SF (1973)
- Wimbledon: 1R (1972)
- US Open: 1R (1973)
Medal record
Universiade
Silver medal – second place	1979 Mexico City	Women's Singles
Silver medal – second place	1979 Mexico City	Women's Doubles
Silver medal – second place	1979 Mexico City	Mixed Doubles
Bronze medal – third place	1977 Sofia	Women's Singles
Bronze medal – third place	1977 Sofia	Women's Doubles
Bronze medal – third place	1977 Sofia	Mixed Doubles

Eugenia Birioukova (born 18 December 1952) is a former Soviet professional tennis player from Baku, Azerbaijan.

Birioukova won the singles title at the 1972 USSR tennis championships, and she finished the season as the top ranked player in the Soviet rankings, ahead of Olga Morozova.

Birioukova competed in the main draw of all four grand slam tournaments during her career. She was a doubles semifinalist at the 1973 French Open, partnering Mona Schallau. On the WTA Tour, she made the singles final of a tournament in Charlotte, North Carolina, which she lost to Evonne Goolagong.

== WTA finals ==
=== Singles (0-1) ===
Result	Date	Tournament	Opponent	Score
Loss	10 September 1973	Charlotte, United States	(Australia) Evonne Goolagong	2–6, 0–6
