= Andrée Martin =

Canadian tennis player

- Country (sports): Canada
- Born: March 18, 1949 (age 76)

Singles

Grand Slam singles results
- Wimbledon: 1R (1971)

Doubles

Grand Slam doubles results
- Wimbledon: 1R (1971)

Andrée Martin (born 18 March 1949) is a Canadian former professional tennis player.

Martin, a Montreal native, debuted for the Canada Federation Cup team in 1969 and over the next seven years featured in a total of 23 rubbers, registering four singles and four doubles wins. She was Canada's top ranked player in 1970, a year where she claimed the Canadian Closed Tennis Championship. In 1971 she featured in the singles main draw at Wimbledon, losing in the opening round to Betty Stöve. Her last Federation Cup appearance in 1975 was a playing captain. She was a 1995 inductee into the Canadian Tennis Hall of Fame.

== See also ==
- List of Canada Fed Cup team representatives
