= Veronica Burton (tennis) =

English tennis player (born 1952)

- Country (sports): Great Britain
- Born: January 27, 1952 (age 74) London, England

Singles
- Career record: -

Grand Slam singles results
- French Open: 2R (1974)
- Wimbledon: 2R (1970, 1972, 1975, 1976)
- US Open: 3R (1973)

Doubles
- Career record: -

Grand Slam doubles results
- Wimbledon: 2R (1971, 1972)
- US Open: 1R (1972)

Veronica Burton (born 27 January 1952) is a British former professional tennis player.

Specialising on clay, Veronica remains the last British player to beat Martina Navratilova in a Grand Slam tournament in the 1973 U.S. Open - Women's Singles.
