= Patti Hogan =

American tennis player

- Full name: Patricia Hogan Fordyce
- Country (sports): United States
- Born: December 21, 1949 (age 76) San Diego, California, U.S.

Singles
- Career record: 347-220 (61.2%)
- Career titles: 13

Grand Slam singles results
- Australian Open: 2R (1971)
- French Open: 1R (1973)
- Wimbledon: QF (1972)
- US Open: 3R (1967, 1968, 1974)

Doubles
- Career titles: 5

Grand Slam doubles results
- Australian Open: QF (1971)
- French Open: 2R (1973)
- Wimbledon: F (1969)
- US Open: QF (1970, 1971, 1972, 1975)

Grand Slam mixed doubles results
- US Open: SF (1968)

Patricia Hogan Fordyce (born December 21, 1949) is a retired American professional tennis player. She competed in the Fed Cup a number of times from 1970 to 1973. With compatriot Peggy Michel, she reached the final of the doubles event at the 1969 Wimbledon Championships.

In 1967, she won the All England Plate, a competition for players who were defeated in the first or second rounds of the Wimbledon singles competition. In July 1973, she won the singles title at the North of England Championships in Hoylake, defeating compatriot Sharon Walsh in the final in three sets.

== Grand Slam finals ==
=== Doubles (1 runner-up) ===
| Result | Year | Championship | Surface | Partner | Opponents | Score |
|---|---|---|---|---|---|---|
| Loss | 1969 | Wimbledon | Grass | (United States) Peggy Michel | (Australia) Margaret Court (Australia) Judy Tegart Dalton | 7–9, 2–6 |
