= Galina Baksheeva =

Soviet tennis player (1945–2019)

- Full name: Galina Petrivna Baksheeva
- Native name: Галина Петрівна Бакшеєва
- Country (sports): Soviet Union
- Born: 12 July 1945; Kyiv, Ukrainian SSR, Soviet Union
- Died: 18 December 2019 (aged 74)
- Plays: Right-handed

Singles

Grand Slam singles results
- French Open: 4R (1968)
- Wimbledon: 4R (1967)

Doubles

Grand Slam doubles results
- French Open: QF (1968)
- Wimbledon: QF (1967)

Galina Baksheeva (Russian: Галина Бакшеєва; 12 July 1945 – 18 December 2019) was a Soviet tennis player from Ukraine.

Born in Kyiv, Baksheeva won back to back Wimbledon junior singles titles in 1961 and 1962.

Baksheeva was a 13-time champion of the USSR during the 1960s, twice in singles and the rest in women's doubles or mixed doubles.

At the Grand Slams, she made the fourth round of the 1967 Wimbledon Championships and 1968 French Open as well as reached the women's doubles quarterfinals at both events.

In 1968, she played in three Federation Cup ties for the Soviet Union, including a quarterfinal against Great Britain.

== See also ==
- List of Soviet Federation Cup team representatives
