= Marina Kroschina =

Ukrainian tennis player

- Kroschina in 1971
- Country (sports): Soviet Union
- Born: 18 April 1953 Alma Ata, Soviet Union
- Died: 4 July 2000 (aged 47) Kyiv, Ukraine
- Plays: Right-handed
- Coach: Vladimir Balva; Vladimir Kamelzon

Singles
- Career record: 7–9

Grand Slam singles results
- French Open: 3R (1975)
- Wimbledon: 3R (1972, 1973)
- US Open: 2R (1975)

Doubles
- Career record: 6–8

Grand Slam doubles results
- French Open: 2R (1975)
- Wimbledon: 3R (1974)
- US Open: QF (1970)
Medal record
Representing Soviet Union
Summer Universiade
Gold medal – first place	1977 Sofia	Singles
Bronze medal – third place	1977 Sofia	Doubles

Marina Vasilyevna Kroschina (Russian: Марина Васильевна Крошина, IPA: [mɐˈrʲinə ˈkroʂɨnə]; 18 April 1953 — 4 July 2000) was a Ukrainian tennis player who competed for the Soviet Union. She won the 1971 Wimbledon girls' singles championships while competing for the Kazakh SSR, her country of birth.

== Life ==
Marina Kroschina was born on 18 April 1953 in the city of Alma Ata, Kazakhstan in the Soviet Union. Her father was a painter and architect, and her mother, Olga Zobachova, a champion of chess in Uzbekistan and Central Asia. She had a romantic relationship with Nikita Mikhalkov. Kroschina committed suicide on 4 July 2000 in Kyiv.

== Career ==
Kroschina won the 1972 European Championship and the All England Plate in 1974. She had some success in the doubles events, winning three titles with Olga Morozova.
