= Lesley Hunt =

Australian tennis player

- Country (sports): Australia
- Born: 29 May 1950 (age 74); Perth, Western Australia
- Height: 168 cm (5 ft 6 in)
- Retired: 1979
- Plays: Right-handed

Singles
- Career record: 69–69

Grand Slam singles results
- Australian Open: SF (1971)
- French Open: 4R (1968)
- Wimbledon: 4R (1971, 1973)
- US Open: QF (1970, 1971, 1974, 1978)

Doubles
- Career record: 79–60
- Career titles: 1

Grand Slam doubles results
- Australian Open: F (1971)
- French Open: SF (1971)
- Wimbledon: QF (1970, 1972, 1973)
- US Open: SF (1972, 1974)

Team competitions
- Fed Cup: W (1971)

Lesley Hunt (born 29 May 1950) is a former tennis player from Perth, Western Australia.

Particularly noted as a junior player, in 1964 at the age of 14 she won a rare double in the Western Australian Women's open, taking both the Open and Junior titles. She won the Australian junior championship in 1967 and 1968 and reached the final of the Wimbledon Junior Invitational in 1968. In that year she also won the French and United States Junior Championships. In 1968, she won the Australian and French Open Junior titles and the Australian Open Junior title again the following year.

In 1974 she was ranked number 3 in Australia. Between 1967 and 1979 she was never outside the top six in Australia, playing among contemporaries Margaret Court, Evonne Goolagong, Kerry Reid and Wendy Turnbull.

Hunt was seeded once in the United States championships (number 8 in 1974); twice at the French Championships (number 4 in 1976 and 7 in 1977); and once at the Australian Championships (number 5 in 1974). She was runner-up in the 1971 Virginia Slims tournament, losing to Margaret Court, and in 1976 reached the final of the Italian Open and the Canadian Open, later that year also reaching the quarterfinals of the US Open. In 1978, she made her first international open victory with a win in the Swiss Open.

As a doubles player, she won the US Open Hardcourt and Claycourt titles with Evonne Goolagong.

In December 1970, she joined with Court and Goolagong in the 1971 Federation Cup victory over Great Britain at Royal King's Park Tennis Club. In the final match she partnered with Court; they beat Virginia Wade and Winnie Shaw.

Hunt was inducted into the Western Australian Hall of Champions in 1993.

== WTA Tour finals ==
=== Doubles 3 (1–2) ===
Legend
Grand Slam	0
WTA Championships	0
Tier I	0
Tier II	0
Tier III	0
Tier IV & V	

Titles by surface
Hard	0
Clay	0
Grass	1
Carpet	0

Result	No.	Date	Tournament	Surface	Partner	Opponents	Score
Loss	1.	Jan 1971	Australian Open, Australia	Grass	(Australia) Jill Emmerson	(Australia) Margaret Court (Australia) Evonne Goolagong	0–6, 0–6
Loss	2.	Oct 1978	US Indoors, U.S.	Carpet	(South Africa) Ilana Kloss	(Australia) Kerry Reid (Australia) Wendy Turnbull	3–6, 3–6
Win	3.	Nov 1978	Christchurch, New Zealand	Grass	(United States) Sharon Walsh	(West Germany) Katja Ebbinghaus (West Germany) Sylvia Hanika	6–1, 7–5
