= 1964 Wimbledon Championships – Women's doubles =

Women's doubles
- 1964 Wimbledon Championships

Final
- Champions: (Australia) Margaret Smith (Australia) Lesley Turner
- Runners-up: (United States) Billie Jean Moffitt (United States) Karen Susman
- Score: 7–5, 6–2

Details
- Draw: 48 (5 Q )
- Seeds: 4

Events
Singles	men	women		boys	girls
Doubles	men	women	mixed	boys	girls
← 1963 ·	Wimbledon Championships	· 1965 →

Maria Bueno and Darlene Hard were the defending champions, but Hard did not compete. Bueno partnered with Robyn Ebbern but lost in the semifinals to Billie Jean Moffitt and Karen Susman.

Margaret Smith and Lesley Turner defeated Moffitt and Susman in the final, 7–5, 6–2 to win the ladies' doubles tennis title at the 1964 Wimbledon Championships.

== Seeds ==
1. (Australia) Margaret Smith / (Australia) Lesley Turner (champions)
2. (United States) Billie Jean Moffitt / (United States) Karen Susman (final)
3. (Brazil) Maria Bueno / (Australia) Robyn Ebbern (semifinals)
4. (South Africa) Renée Haygarth / (United Kingdom) Ann Jones (semifinals)

Click on the seed number of a player to go to their draw section.

== Draw ==
=== Key ===
- Q = Qualifier
- WC = Wild card
- LL = Lucky loser
- Alt = Alternate
- SE = Special exempt
- PR = Protected ranking
- ITF = ITF entry
- JE = Junior exempt
- w/o = Walkover
- r = Retired
- d = Defaulted
- SR = Special ranking

=== Finals ===
Quarterfinals
1	(Australia) Margaret Smith (Australia) Lesley Turner	6	6
(Czechoslovakia) Vlasta Kodešová (Czechoslovakia) Věra Suková	0	2
4	(South Africa) Renée Haygarth (United Kingdom) Ann Jones	6	6
(United Kingdom) Rita Bentley (United Kingdom) Virginia Wade	0	0
(United States) Justina Bricka (United States) Carol Hanks	5	6	3
3	(Brazil) Maria Bueno (Australia) Robyn Ebbern	7	2	6
(United States) Donna Fales (United States) Belmar Gunderson	2	3
2	(United States) Billie Jean Moffitt (United States) Karen Susman	6	6

Semifinals
1	(Australia) Margaret Smith (Australia) Lesley Turner	6	6
4	(South Africa) Renée Haygarth (United Kingdom) Ann Jones	3	2
3	(Brazil) Maria Bueno (Australia) Robyn Ebbern	6	2	3
2	(United States) Billie Jean Moffitt (United States) Karen Susman	4	6	6

Final
1	(Australia) Margaret Smith (Australia) Lesley Turner	7	6
2	(United States) Billie Jean Moffitt (United States) Karen Susman	5	2

=== Top half ===
==== Section 1 ====
First round

Second round
1	(Australia) Margaret Smith (Australia) Lesley Turner	6	6
(Netherlands) Trudy Groenman (Netherlands) Anja Lepoutre	1	1
(West Germany) Helga Niessen (West Germany) Almut Sturm	4	9	8
(South Africa) Marie Fourie (South Africa) Glenda Swan	6	7	6
(Norway) Liv Paldan (Sweden) Ulla Sandulf	4	3
(Czechoslovakia) Vlasta Kodešová (Czechoslovakia) Věra Suková	6	6
(United Kingdom) Angela Mortimer (United Kingdom) Pauline Roberts	6	6
(Sweden) Katarina Bartholdson (Sweden) Gudrun Rosin	2	1

Third round
1	(Australia) M Smith (Australia) L Turner	6	6
(West Germany) H Niessen (West Germany) A Sturm	1	1
(Czechoslovakia) V Kodešová (Czechoslovakia) V Suková	6	7
(United Kingdom) A Mortimer (United Kingdom) P Roberts	4	5

Fourth round
1	(Australia) M Smith (Australia) L Turner	6	6
(Czechoslovakia) V Kodešová (Czechoslovakia) V Suková	0	2

==== Section 2 ====
First round
4	(South Africa) Renée Haygarth (United Kingdom) Ann Jones	6	6
(Australia) Robin Lesh (Australia) Helen Slattery	1	0
(United Kingdom) Pat Hird (United Kingdom) Caroline Yates-Bell	1	4
(Argentina) Norma Baylon (West Germany) Helga Schultze	6	6
(Republic of Ireland) Geraldine Houlihan (Republic of Ireland) Eleanor O'Neill	2	2
(United States) Carole Caldwell (United States) Victoria Palmer	6	6
(Australia) Jan Lehane (Australia) Judy Tegart	6	7
Q	(United Kingdom) Jane Godfrey (United Kingdom) Pauline White	2	5
(United Kingdom) Deidre Catt (United Kingdom) Liz Starkie	6	6
(Spain) Carmen Coronado (Spain) Ana María Estalella	1	2
(France) Monique Salfati (France) Isabelle de Lansalut	6	2
Q	(Australia) Margaret Harris (Australia) Fay Toyne	8	6
(Italy) Francesca Gordigiani (Italy) Maria Teresa Riedl	w/o
(United Kingdom) Rita Bentley (United Kingdom) Virginia Wade
(United States) Cathy Lee Crosby (United States) Linda Lou Crosby	4	5
Q	(United Kingdom) Margaret Lee (United Kingdom) Ann Owen	6	7

Second round
4	(South Africa) R Haygarth (United Kingdom) A Jones	6	6
(Argentina) N Baylon (West Germany) H Schultze	1	2
(United States) C Caldwell (United States) V Palmer	w/o
(Australia) J Lehane (Australia) J Tegart
(United Kingdom) D Catt (United Kingdom) E Starkie	6	6
Q	(Australia) M Harris (Australia) F Toyne	1	3
(United Kingdom) R Bentley (United Kingdom) V Wade	4	6	9
Q	(United Kingdom) M Lee (United Kingdom) A Owen	6	1	7

Third round
4	(South Africa) R Haygarth (United Kingdom) A Jones	7	5	10
(Australia) J Lehane (Australia) J Tegart	5	7	8
(United Kingdom) D Catt (United Kingdom) E Starkie	6	3	7
(United Kingdom) R Bentley (United Kingdom) V Wade	3	6	9

Fourth round
4	(South Africa) R Haygarth (United Kingdom) A Jones	6	6
(United Kingdom) R Bentley (United Kingdom) V Wade	0	0

=== Bottom half ===
==== Section 3 ====
First round
(United Kingdom) Christine Truman (United Kingdom) Nell Truman	w/o
(United States) Judy Alvarez (United States) Tory Fretz
(United States) Justina Bricka (United States) Carol Hanks	6	6
(West Germany) Renate Ostermann (West Germany) Heide Schildknecht	2	1
(Hungary) Zsuzsa Körmöczy (Belgium) Christiane Mercelis	w/o
(United States) Carol-Ann Prosen (South Africa) Heather Segal
(United Kingdom) Heather Allen (United Kingdom) Mary McAnally	0	6	2
Q	(United Kingdom) Jean Knight (United Kingdom) Jenny Wagstaff	6	2	6
Q	(United Kingdom) Valerie Clark (United Kingdom) Joyce Fulton	6	1	6
(France) Jacqueline Rees-Lewis (Netherlands) Jenny Ridderhof-Seven	2	6	3
(Soviet Union) Anna Dmitrieva (Austria) Sonja Pachta	6	3	7
(United States) Peachy Kellmeyer (United States) Stephanie DeFina	2	6	5
(United Kingdom) Carole Rosser (United Kingdom) Joyce Williams	5	5
(France) Rosie Darmon (South Africa) Pam Watermeyer	7	7
(Australia) Madonna Schacht (South Africa) Annette Van Zyl	1	4
3	(Brazil) Maria Bueno (Australia) Robyn Ebbern	6	6

Second round
(United States) J Alvarez (United States) T Fretz	2	2
(United States) J Bricka (United States) C Hanks	6	6
(United States) C-A Prosen (South Africa) H Segal	6	3	6
Q	(United Kingdom) J Knight (United Kingdom) J Wagstaff	3	6	2
Q	(United Kingdom) V Clark (United Kingdom) J Fulton	3	3
(Soviet Union) A Dmitrieva (Austria) S Pachta	6	6
(France) R Darmon (South Africa) P Watermeyer	1	0
3	(Brazil) M Bueno (Australia) R Ebbern	6	6

Third round
(United States) J Bricka (United States) C Hanks	6	6
(United States) C-A Prosen (South Africa) H Segal	1	2
(Soviet Union) A Dmitrieva (Austria) S Pachta	1	2
3	(Brazil) M Bueno (Australia) R Ebbern	6	6

Fourth round
(United States) J Bricka (United States) C Hanks	5	6	3
3	(Brazil) M Bueno (Australia) R Ebbern	7	2	6

==== Section 4 ====
First round

Second round
(United States) Donna Fales (United States) Belmar Gunderson	7	6
(France) Françoise Dürr (France) Janine Lieffrig	5	4
(Spain) Marta Pombo (Spain) Mercedes Solsona	1	2
(Canada) Vicki Berner (United States) Mary Habicht	6	6
(Australia) Trish McClenaughan (Australia) Helen Plaisted	1	4
(United States) Mary-Ann Eisel (Italy) Lea Pericoli	6	6
(United Kingdom) Lorna Cawthorn (United Kingdom) Robin Lloyd	1	6
2	(United States) Billie Jean Moffitt (United States) Karen Susman	6	8

Third round
(United States) D Fales (United States) B Gunderson	3	6	6
(Canada) V Berner (United States) M Habicht	6	3	4
(United States) M-A Eisel (Italy) L Pericoli	1	3
2	(United States) BJ Moffitt (United States) K Susman	6	6

Fourth round
(United States) D Fales (United States) B Gunderson	2	3
2	(United States) BJ Moffitt (United States) K Susman	6	6
