= 1964 Wimbledon Championships – Mixed doubles =

Mixed doubles
- 1964 Wimbledon Championships

Final
- Champions: (Australia) Fred Stolle (Australia) Lesley Turner
- Runners-up: (Australia) Ken Fletcher (Australia) Margaret Smith
- Score: 6–4, 6–4

Details
- Draw: 80 (5 Q )
- Seeds: 4

Events
Singles	men	women		boys	girls
Doubles	men	women	mixed	boys	girls
← 1963 ·	Wimbledon Championships	· 1965 →

Fred Stolle and Lesley Turner defeated the reigning champions Ken Fletcher and Margaret Smith in the final, 6–4, 6–4 to win the mixed doubles tennis title at the 1964 Wimbledon Championships.

== Seeds ==
1. (Australia) Ken Fletcher / (Australia) Margaret Smith (final)
2. (Australia) Fred Stolle / (Australia) Lesley Turner (champions)
3. (Australia) Bob Hewitt / (Brazil) Maria Bueno (quarterfinals)
4. (Australia) Bob Howe / (Argentina) Norma Baylon (third round, withdrew)

Click on the seed number of a player to go to their draw section.

== Draw ==
Key

- Q = Qualifier
- WC = Wild card
- LL = Lucky loser
- Alt = Alternate
- ITF = ITF entry
- PR = Protected ranking
- SR = Special ranking
- SE = Special exempt
- JE = Junior exempt
- JR = Junior Accelerator Programme entrant
- CO = College Accelerator Programme entrant
- NG = Next Gen Accelerator Program entrant
- w/o = Walkover
- r = Retired
- d = Defaulted

=== Finals ===
Quarterfinals
1	(Australia) Ken Fletcher (Australia) Margaret Smith	6	8
(Australia) John Keller (United Kingdom) Deidre Catt	4	6
(United States) Frank Froehling (United States) Justina Bricka	6	6
(South Africa) Abe Segal (South Africa) Renée Haygarth	4	4
(Netherlands) Tom Okker (Netherlands) Trudy Groenman	6	6
3	(Australia) Bob Hewitt (Brazil) Maria Bueno	2	4
(United States) Rod Susman (United States) Karen Susman	4	7	0
2	(Australia) Fred Stolle (Australia) Lesley Turner	6	5	6

Semifinals
1	(Australia) Ken Fletcher (Australia) Margaret Smith	7	6
(United States) Frank Froehling (United States) Justina Bricka	5	3
(Netherlands) Tom Okker (Netherlands) Trudy Groenman	6	2	3
2	(Australia) Fred Stolle (Australia) Lesley Turner	2	6	6

Final
1	(Australia) Ken Fletcher (Australia) Margaret Smith	4	4
2	(Australia) Fred Stolle (Australia) Lesley Turner	6	6

=== Top half ===
==== Section 1 ====
First round

Second round
1	(Australia) Ken Fletcher (Australia) Margaret Smith	6	6
(Finland) Reino Nyyssönen (Sweden) Gudrun Rosin	1	0
(United Kingdom) Keith Wooldridge (United Kingdom) Joyce Williams	6	3	6
(United Kingdom) Mark Cox (United Kingdom) Alison Stroud	2	6	3
(Netherlands) Pieter van Eijsden (Netherlands) Jenny Ridderhof-Seven	1	3
(South Africa) Clive Brebnor (United Kingdom) Angela Mortimer	6	6
(United States) Butch Newman (United States) Victoria Palmer	w/o
(West Germany) Wilhelm Bungert (Australia) Judy Tegart

Third round
1	(Australia) K Fletcher (Australia) M Smith	6	6
(United Kingdom) K Wooldridge (United Kingdom) J Williams	2	3
(South Africa) C Brebnor (United Kingdom) A Mortimer	10	1
(West Germany) W Bungert (Australia) J Tegart	12	6

Fourth round
1	(Australia) K Fletcher (Australia) M Smith	4	6	6
(West Germany) W Bungert (Australia) J Tegart	6	3	4

==== Section 2 ====
First round

Second round
(Greece) Nicholas Kalogeropoulos (United States) Carol-Ann Prosen	3	6	4
(Australia) John Keller (United Kingdom) Deidre Catt	6	2	6
(New Zealand) Lew Gerrard (Australia) Jan Lehane	6	6
(Czechoslovakia) Milan Holeček (Czechoslovakia) Vlasta Kodešová	3	0
Q	(United Kingdom) GM Price (United Kingdom) PA Spencer	6	6
(United States) Gene Scott (United Kingdom) Caroline Yates-Bell	4	3
(United Kingdom) Humphrey Truman (United Kingdom) Christine Truman	w/o
(United States) Tom Brown (South Africa) Heather Segal

Third round
(Australia) J Keller (United Kingdom) D Catt	8	10	6
(New Zealand) L Gerrard (Australia) J Lehane	10	8	2
Q	(United Kingdom) GM Price (United Kingdom) PA Spencer	3	3
(United States) T Brown (South Africa) H Segal	6	6

Fourth round
(Australia) J Keller (United Kingdom) D Catt	3	6	6
(United States) T Brown (South Africa) H Segal	6	0	2

==== Section 3 ====
First round

Second round
4	(Australia) Bob Howe (Argentina) Norma Baylon	9	3	7
(Australia) Ronald McKenzie (France) Jacqueline Rees-Lewis	7	6	5
(France) Daniel Contet (France) Janine Lieffrig	4	2
(France) Alain Bresson (France) Françoise Dürr	6	6
(New Zealand) Mark Otway (United Kingdom) Liz Starkie	5	2
(United States) Frank Froehling (United States) Justina Bricka	7	6
(United States) Clark Graebner (United States) Carole Caldwell	6	6
(New Zealand) John McDonald (United Kingdom) Nell Truman	1	1

Third round
4	(Australia) R Howe (Argentina) N Baylon	w/o
(France) A Bresson (France) F Dürr
(United States) F Froehling (United States) J Bricka	7	7
(United States) C Graebner (United States) C Caldwell	5	5

Fourth round
(France) A Bresson (France) F Dürr	1	4
(United States) F Froehling (United States) J Bricka	6	6

==== Section 4 ====
First round
Q	(United Kingdom) Roy Dixon (United Kingdom) Cathy Lyon	3	8	8
(Australia) John Hillebrand (Australia) Charlene Hillebrand	6	6	6
(United States) Jim McManus (United States) Judy Alvarez
(United Kingdom) Billy Knight (United Kingdom) Jean Knight	w/o
(United Kingdom) Harry Matheson (United Kingdom) Carole Rosser	4	1
(Australia) Martin Mulligan (Australia) Madonna Schacht	6	6
(Australia) Brian Tobin (Australia) Helen Plaisted	6	6
(United Kingdom) Geoffrey Paish (United Kingdom) Billie Woodgate	2	2
(South Africa) Bob Maud (South Africa) Glenda Swan	4	6	6
(Sweden) Ove Bengtson (Sweden) Katarina Bartholdson	6	2	2
(Australia) Bob Carmichael (Australia) Robin Lesh	3	2
(United Kingdom) Roger Taylor (United Kingdom) Ann Jones	6	6
Q	(United States) Norm Perry (Canada) Vicki Berner	4	4
(South Africa) Abe Segal (South Africa) Renée Haygarth	6	6
(United States) Cliff Richey (United States) Nancy Richey	9	4	6
(Spain) José María Gisbert (United States) Mary Habicht	7	6	3

Second round
Q	(United Kingdom) R Dixon (United Kingdom) C Lyon	9	1
(United States) J McManus (United States) J Alvarez	11	6
(Australia) M Mulligan (Australia) M Schacht	6	5
(Australia) B Tobin (Australia) H Plaisted	8	7
(South Africa) R Maud (South Africa) G Swan	6	5	5
(United Kingdom) R Taylor (United Kingdom) A Jones	4	7	7
(South Africa) A Segal (South Africa) R Haygarth	6	6
(United States) C Richey (United States) N Richey	3	1

Third round
(United States) J McManus (United States) J Alvarez	0	4
(Australia) B Tobin (Australia) H Plaisted	6	6
(United Kingdom) R Taylor (United Kingdom) A Jones	3	6	1
(South Africa) A Segal (South Africa) R Haygarth	6	3	6

Fourth round
(Australia) B Tobin (Australia) H Plaisted	2	6	1
(South Africa) A Segal (South Africa) R Haygarth	6	4	6

=== Bottom half ===
==== Section 5 ====
First round
(Ecuador) Eduardo Zuleta (Australia) Helen Slattery	2	4
(South Africa) David Phillips (South Africa) Marie Fourie	6	6
(United Kingdom) Gerry Oakley (United Kingdom) Pat Hird	6	6
(Venezuela) Isaías Pimentel (United States) Linda Lou Crosby	3	4
(United Kingdom) Clay Iles (United Kingdom) Heather Allen	7	6	3
(Italy) Alberto Lazzarino (Italy) Lea Pericoli	9	3	6
(Brazil) José Edison Mandarino (Spain) Carmen Coronado	8	6
(United Kingdom) Geoff Ward (United Kingdom) Elaine Shenton	6	1
Q	(United Kingdom) Roger Ambrose (United Kingdom) Sue Porter	11	5
(France) Jean Borotra (France) Isabelle de Lansalut	13	7
(South Africa) Keith Diepraam (South Africa) Pam Watermeyer	7	5
(New Zealand) Ian Crookenden (Australia) Robyn Ebbern	9	7
(Netherlands) Tom Okker (Netherlands) Trudy Groenman	6	6
(Rhodesia) Adrian Bey (Rhodesia) Jenny Morris	1	1
(Denmark) Jan Leschly (Austria) Sonja Pachta	w/o
(Australia) Jimmy Moore (Australia) Fay Toyne

Second round
(South Africa) D Phillips (South Africa) M Fourie	6	6
(United Kingdom) G Oakley (United Kingdom) P Hird	4	1
(Italy) A Lazzarino (Italy) L Pericoli	2	3
(Brazil) JE Mandarino (Spain) C Coronado	6	6
(France) J Borotra (France) I de Lansalut	3	0
(New Zealand) I Crookenden (Australia) R Ebbern	6	6
(Netherlands) T Okker (Netherlands) G Groenman	6	6
(Australia) J Moore (Australia) F Toyne	4	1

Third round
(South Africa) D Phillips (South Africa) M Fourie	6	5	6
(Brazil) JE Mandarino (Spain) C Coronado	4	7	1
(New Zealand) I Crookenden (Australia) R Ebbern	6	3	6
(Netherlands) T Okker (Netherlands) G Groenman	3	6	8

Fourth round
(South Africa) D Phillips (South Africa) M Fourie	5	6	2
(Netherlands) T Okker (Netherlands) G Groenman	7	3	6

==== Section 6 ====
First round

Second round
(Australia) Bill Bowrey (Australia) Trish McClenaughan	9	3	9
(United States) Arthur Ashe (United States) Carol Hanks	7	6	7
(Belgium) Eric Drossart (Belgium) Christiane Mercelis	6	6
(Spain) José Luis Arilla (France) Michelle Boulle	2	3
(India) Naresh Kumar (United Kingdom) Pauline Roberts	6	6
(Republic of Ireland) Derek Arthurs (Republic of Ireland) Geraldine Houlihan	2	1
(United States) Hugh Stewart (United States) D Rand	1	1
3	(Australia) Bob Hewitt (Brazil) Maria Bueno	6	6

Third round
(Australia) W Bowrey (Australia) P McClenaughan	6	9	3
(Belgium) E Drossart (Belgium) C Mercelis	4	11	6
(India) N Kumar (United Kingdom) P Roberts	1	2
3	(Australia) R Hewitt (Brazil) M Bueno	6	6

Fourth round
(Belgium) E Drossart (Belgium) C Mercelis	6	3	0
3	(Australia) R Hewitt (Brazil) M Bueno	4	6	6

==== Section 7 ====
First round

Second round
(Canada) Keith Carpenter (United Kingdom) Mary McAnally	5	4
(South Africa) LJ Silvester (United Kingdom) Lorna Cawthorn	7	6
(United States) Donald Dell (United States) Billie Jean Moffitt	6	4
(United States) Rod Susman (United States) Karen Susman	8	6
Q	(South Africa) Terry Ryan (Rhodesia) Pat Walkden	4	6	6
(France) Jean-Claude Barclay (France) Christiane Spinoza	6	3	2
(Soviet Union) Sergei Likhachev (Soviet Union) Anna Dmitrieva	6	6
(United Kingdom) Peter Curtis (United Kingdom) Virginia Wade	1	4

Third round
(South Africa) LJ Silvester (United Kingdom) L Cawthorn	4	1
(United States) R Susman (United States) K Susman	6	6
Q	(South Africa) T Ryan (Rhodesia) P Walkden
(Soviet Union) S Likhachev (Soviet Union) A Dmitrieva	w/o

Fourth round
(United States) R Susman (United States) K Susman	6	6
Q	(South Africa) T Ryan (Rhodesia) P Walkden	1	3

==== Section 8 ====
First round

Second round
(South Africa) Ray Weedon (South Africa) Annette Van Zyl
(Czechoslovakia) Jiří Javorský (Czechoslovakia) Věra Suková	w/o
(Colombia) William Álvarez (Italy) Francesca Gordigiani	6	3	4
(South Africa) Pat Cramer (United Kingdom) Robin Lloyd	3	6	6
(France) Pierre Darmon (France) Rosie Darmon	3	2
(France) Michel Leclercq (France) Monique Salfati	6	6
(United States) Ned Neely (United States) Donna Fales	1	4
2	(Australia) Fred Stolle (Australia) Lesley Turner	6	6

Third round
(South Africa) R Weedon (South Africa) A Van Zyl	6	3	6
(South Africa) P Cramer (United Kingdom) R Lloyd	1	6	2
(France) M Leclercq (France) M Salfati	3	4
2	(Australia) F Stolle (Australia) L Turner	6	6

Fourth round
(South Africa) R Weedon (South Africa) A Van Zyl	5	3
2	(Australia) F Stolle (Australia) L Turner	7	6
