= 1966 Wimbledon Championships – Women's singles =

Women's singles
- 1966 Wimbledon Championships

Final
- Champion: (United States) Billie Jean King
- Runner-up: (Brazil) Maria Bueno
- Score: 6–3, 3–6, 6–1

Details
- Draw: 96 (10Q)
- Seeds: 8

Events
Singles	men	women		boys	girls
Doubles	men	women	mixed	boys	girls
← 1965 ·	Wimbledon Championships	· 1967 →

Billie Jean King defeated Maria Bueno in the final, 6–3, 3–6, 6–1 to win the ladies' singles tennis title at the 1966 Wimbledon Championships. Margaret Smith was the defending champion, but lost in the semifinals to King.

The second round match in which Gail Sherriff beat her sister Carol was the second match between sisters in the ladies' singles draw at Wimbledon, the first being in the 1884 Wimbledon Championships when Maud Watson beat Lillian. The next Wimbledon match between sisters in the singles draw was in 2000 between Serena and Venus Williams.

== Seeds ==
1. (Australia) Margaret Smith (semifinals)
2. (Brazil) Maria Bueno (final)
3. (United Kingdom) Ann Jones (semifinals)
4. (United States) Billie Jean King (champion)
5. (United States) Nancy Richey (quarterfinals)
6. (South Africa) Annette Van Zyl (quarterfinals)
7. (France) Françoise Dürr (quarterfinals)
8. (Argentina) Norma Baylon (third round)

Click on the seed number of a player to go to their draw section.

== Draw ==
Key

- Q = Qualifier
- WC = Wild card
- LL = Lucky loser
- Alt = Alternate
- ITF = ITF entry
- PR = Protected ranking
- SR = Special ranking
- SE = Special exempt
- JE = Junior exempt
- JR = Junior Accelerator Programme entrant
- CO = College Accelerator Programme entrant
- NG = Next Gen Accelerator Program entrant
- w/o = Walkover
- r = Retired
- d = Defaulted

=== Finals ===
Quarterfinals
1	(Australia) Margaret Smith	6	6
(Netherlands) Trudy Groenman	0	4
4	(United States) Billie Jean King	1	6	6
6	(South Africa) Annette Van Zyl	6	2	4
5	(United States) Nancy Richey	6	1	1
3	(United Kingdom) Ann Jones	4	6	6
7	(France) Françoise Dürr	4	3
2	(Brazil) Maria Bueno	6	6

Semifinals
1	(Australia) Margaret Smith	3	3
4	(United States) Billie Jean King	6	6
3	(United Kingdom) Ann Jones	3	11	5
2	(Brazil) Maria Bueno	6	9	7

Final
4	(United States) Billie Jean King	6	3	6
2	(Brazil) Maria Bueno	3	6	1

=== Top half ===
==== Section 1 ====
First round

Second round
1	(Australia) Margaret Smith	8	6
(United Kingdom) Liz Starkie	6	2
(Czechoslovakia) Jitka Volavková	2	3
(United States) Jane Albert	6	6
(Austria) Sonja Pachta	6	6
(Sweden) Ulla Sandulf	1	4
(West Germany) Edda Buding	6	6
(Australia) Trish Faulkner	4	3

Third round
1	(Australia) M Smith	6	6
(United States) J Albert	1	2
(Austria) S Pachta	1	4
(West Germany) E Buding	6	6

Fourth round
1	(Australia) M Smith	6	6
(West Germany) E Buding	1	2

==== Section 2 ====
First round

Second round
8	(Argentina) Norma Baylon	6	6
(Canada) Faye Urban	3	0
(Netherlands) Trudy Groenman	6	6
(Italy) Francesca Gordigiani	4	4
Q	(Netherlands) Lidy Jansen Venneboer	6	4	6
(France) Isabelle de Lansalut	3	6	3
(South Africa) Esmé Emmanuel	3	5
(Australia) Madonna Schacht	6	7

Third round
8	(Argentina) N Baylon	6	4	4
(Netherlands) G Groenman	4	6	6
Q	(Netherlands) L Jansen Venneboer	0	3
(Australia) M Schacht	6	6

Fourth round
(Netherlands) G Groenman	6	6
(Australia) M Schacht	1	2

==== Section 3 ====
First round
4	(United States) Billie Jean King	6	8
(United Kingdom) Winnie Shaw	2	6
(Italy) Maria Teresa Riedl	1	2
(United Kingdom) Nell Truman	6	6
Q	(Australia) Lynn Bellamy	1	1
(Belgium) Christiane Mercelis	6	6
(Netherlands) Betty Stöve	7	6
(South Africa) Greta Delport	5	2
(Sweden) Eva Lundqvist	1	3
(United States) Donna Fales	6	6
(Australia) Karen Krantzcke	6	6	6
(West Germany) Helga Niessen	4	8	4
(United Kingdom) Alex Soady	1	4
(Australia) Carol Sherriff	6	6
(Australia) Gail Sherriff	6	3	6
(Australia) Jill Blackman	4	6	4

Second round
4	(United States) BJ King	6	6
(United Kingdom) E Truman	4	4
(Belgium) C Mercelis	6	2
(Netherlands) B Stöve	8	6
(United States) D Fales	6	4	4
(Australia) K Krantzcke	1	6	6
(Australia) C Sherriff	10	3	3
(Australia) G Sherriff	8	6	6

Third round
4	(United States) BJ King	6	6
(Netherlands) B Stöve	4	3
(Australia) K Krantzcke	11	6
(Australia) G Sherriff	9	3

Fourth round
4	(United States) BJ King	9	6
(Australia) K Krantzcke	7	2

==== Section 4 ====
First round
6	(South Africa) Annette Van Zyl	6	6
(United Kingdom) Vivienne Dennis	1	0
(Soviet Union) Galina Baksheeva
(United States) Kathy Blake	w/o
(United States) Mary Habicht	8	6
(United Kingdom) Mary McAnally	6	1
(United States) Dorothy Knode	10	6
(United States) Alice Tym	8	2
(United States) Mimi Arnold	6	8
Q	(Australia) Teresa Van Haren	3	6
(United Kingdom) Rosemary Deloford	4	4
(Australia) Helen Gourlay	6	6
(South Africa) Laura Rossouw	3	8	6
Q	(Netherlands) Astrid Suurbeek	6	6	2
(United Kingdom) Carole Rosser	2	6	6
(United Kingdom) Heather Allen	6	3	3

Second round
6	(South Africa) A Van Zyl	6	3	6
(Soviet Union) G Baksheeva	3	6	3
(United States) M Habicht	6	6
(United States) D Knode	1	2
(United States) M Arnold	6	6
(Australia) H Gourlay	3	2
(South Africa) L Rossouw	6	6
(United Kingdom) C Rosser	4	2

Third round
6	(South Africa) A Van Zyl	6	6
(United States) M Habicht	3	1
(United States) M Arnold	6	7
(South Africa) L Rossouw	1	5

Fourth round
6	(South Africa) A Van Zyl	6	6
(United States) M Arnold	1	2

=== Bottom half ===
==== Section 5 ====
First round
(West Germany) Helga Schultze	4	11	12
(France) Janine Lieffrig	6	9	10
(South Africa) Glenda Swan	6	6
Q	(United Kingdom) Jane Poynder	2	4
(Sweden) Ingrid Löfdahl	4	2
(United States) Kathleen Harter	6	6
Q	(France) Anne-Marie Rouchon	9	5	4
(Australia) Dorothy Whitely	7	7	6
(United Kingdom) Rita Bentley	6	6
(Italy) Roberta Beltrame	3	2
(South Africa) Heather Segal	6	6
Q	(United States) Susan Behlmar	2	4
(Soviet Union) Olga Morozova	1	3
(Rhodesia) Pat Walkden	6	6
(Australia) Fay Toyne	6	3	0
5	(United States) Nancy Richey	1	6	6

Second round
(West Germany) H Schultze	6	6
(South Africa) G Swan	4	3
(United States) K Harter	1	6	6
(Australia) D Whitely	6	3	0
(United Kingdom) R Bentley	6	6
(South Africa) H Segal	1	2
(Rhodesia) P Walkden	5	4
5	(United States) N Richey	7	6

Third round
(West Germany) H Schultze	3	2
(United States) K Harter	6	6
(United Kingdom) R Bentley	6	4	2
5	(United States) N Richey	3	6	6

Fourth round
(United States) K Harter	2	4
5	(United States) N Richey	6	6

==== Section 6 ====
First round
(France) Rosie Darmon	6	7
(Netherlands) Elsie Spruyt	2	5
(Italy) Lucia Bassi	3	6
(United States) Rosie Casals	6	8
Q	(United Kingdom) Sally Holdsworth	2	3
(Australia) Kerry Melville	6	6
Q	(France) Christiane Spinoza	7	6
(United Kingdom) Robin Lloyd	5	4
(Canada) Vicki Berner	1	3
(United Kingdom) Frances MacLennan	6	6
Q	(United States) Nancy Reed	2	6	6
(United Kingdom) Sue Tutt	6	3	4
(United Kingdom) Joyce Williams	6	6
(United States) Carole Ann Loop	4	4
(Italy) Lea Pericoli	1	2
3	(United Kingdom) Ann Jones	6	6

Second round
(France) R Darmon	6	3	1
(United States) R Casals	2	6	6
(Australia) K Melville	3	6	6
Q	(France) C Spinoza	6	1	2
(United Kingdom) F MacLennan	1	6	6
Q	(United States) N Reed	6	2	4
(United Kingdom) J Williams	5	2
3	(United Kingdom) A Jones	7	6

Third round
(United States) R Casals	1	7	6
(Australia) K Melville	6	5	4
(United Kingdom) F MacLennan	0	2
3	(United Kingdom) A Jones	6	6

Fourth round
(United States) R Casals	2	3
3	(United Kingdom) A Jones	6	6

==== Section 7 ====
First round

Second round
(United Kingdom) Lorna Greville-Collins	6	6	6
(United Kingdom) Pauline Roberts	8	1	4
(United Kingdom) Shirley Brasher	6	6
(Czechoslovakia) Vlasta Vopičková	4	1
(Netherlands) Elly Krocké	8	1	2
(United States) Mary-Ann Eisel	6	6	6
(South Africa) Maryna Godwin	4	5
7	(France) Françoise Dürr	6	7

Third round
(United Kingdom) L Greville-Collins	4	2
(United Kingdom) S Brasher	6	6
(United States) M-A Eisel	4	5
7	(France) F Dürr	6	7

Fourth round
(United Kingdom) S Brasher	2	2
7	(France) F Dürr	6	6

==== Section 8 ====
First round

Second round
(United States) Julie Heldman	6	6
(Italy) Silvana Lazzarino	2	1
(Australia) Judy Tegart	6	8
(United Kingdom) Virginia Wade	1	6
(West Germany) Heide Orth	3	2
(United States) Tory Fretz	6	6
(United States) Stephanie DeFina	1	2
2	(Brazil) Maria Bueno	6	6

Third round
(United States) J Heldman	1	1
(Australia) J Tegart	6	6
(United States) T Fretz	2	0
2	(Brazil) M Bueno	6	6

Fourth round
(Australia) J Tegart	3	6	2
2	(Brazil) M Bueno	6	4	6

Preceded by 1966 French Championships – Women's singles	Grand Slam women's singles	Succeeded by 1966 U.S. National Championships – Women's singles
