= 1965 Wimbledon Championships – Women's singles =

Women's singles
- 1965 Wimbledon Championships

Final
- Champion: (Australia) Margaret Smith
- Runner-up: (Brazil) Maria Bueno
- Score: 6–4, 7–5

Details
- Draw: 96 (10 Q )
- Seeds: 8

Events
Singles	men	women		boys	girls
Doubles	men	women	mixed	boys	girls
← 1964 ·	Wimbledon Championships	· 1966 →

Margaret Smith defeated the defending champion Maria Bueno in the final, 6–4, 7–5 to win the ladies' singles tennis title at the 1965 Wimbledon Championships. For the first time in the history of seeding in the championships, there was no British player seeded in the draw.

== Seeds ==
1. (Brazil) Maria Bueno (final)
2. (Australia) Margaret Smith (champion)
3. (Australia) Lesley Turner (quarterfinals)
4. (United States) Nancy Richey (quarterfinals)
5. (United States) Billie Jean Moffitt (semifinals)
6. (United States) Carole Graebner (second round)
7. (South Africa) Annette Van Zyl (withdrew)
8. (France) Françoise Dürr (fourth round)

Click on the seed number of a player to go to their draw section.

Annette Van Zyl withdrew due to a family bereavement. She was replaced in the draw by lucky loser Michelle Boulle.

== Draw ==
=== Key ===
- Q = Qualifier
- WC = Wild card
- LL = Lucky loser
- Alt = Alternate
- ITF = ITF entry
- PR = Protected ranking
- SR = Special ranking
- SE = Special exempt
- JE = Junior exempt
- JR = Junior Accelerator Programme entrant
- CO = College Accelerator Programme entrant
- NG = Next Gen Accelerator Program entrant
- w/o = Walkover
- r = Retired
- d = Defaulted

=== Finals ===
Quarterfinals
1	(Brazil) Maria Bueno	6	6
(United States) Jane Albert	2	2
3	(Australia) Lesley Turner	2	1
5	(United States) Billie Jean Moffitt	6	6
(United Kingdom) Christine Truman	6	1	7
4	(United States) Nancy Richey	4	6	5
(United States) Justina Bricka	3	0
2	(Australia) Margaret Smith	6	6

Semifinals
1	(Brazil) Maria Bueno	6	5	6
5	(United States) Billie Jean Moffitt	4	7	3
(United Kingdom) Christine Truman	4	0
2	(Australia) Margaret Smith	6	6

Final
1	(Brazil) Maria Bueno	4	5
2	(Australia) Margaret Smith	6	7

=== Top half ===
==== Section 1 ====
First round

Second round
1	(Brazil) Maria Bueno	6	6
(United Kingdom) Winnie Shaw	3	2
(Italy) Maria Teresa Riedl	2	0
(Australia) Madonna Schacht	6	6
(Austria) Monika Hassmann	3	6	1
(Sweden) Christina Sandberg	6	3	6
(United States) Mary Habicht	2	2
(United Kingdom) Ann Jones	6	6

Third round
1	(Brazil) M Bueno	6	7
(Australia) M Schacht	4	5
(Sweden) C Sandberg	0	3
(United Kingdom) A Jones	6	6

Fourth round
1	(Brazil) M Bueno	6	7
(United Kingdom) A Jones	4	5

==== Section 2 ====
First round

Second round
8	(France) Françoise Dürr	6	6
(Spain) Carmen Coronado	1	2
(United States) Mary-Ann Eisel	3	6	3
(South Africa) Glenda Swan	6	3	6
(Argentina) Norma Baylon	3	4
(United States) Jane Albert	6	6
(United Kingdom) Heather Allen	5	2
(West Germany) Helga Schultze	7	6

Third round
8	(France) F Dürr	6	6
(South Africa) G Swan	1	2
(United States) J Albert	6	6
(West Germany) H Schultze	4	3

Fourth round
8	(France) F Dürr	4	5
(United States) J Albert	6	7

==== Section 3 ====
First round
3	(Australia) Lesley Turner	6	6
(France) Janine Lieffrig	0	1
Q	(United States) Alice Tym	7	3
(Australia) Gail Sherriff	9	6
(United States) Kathy Blake	6	6
(Spain) Ana María Estalella	4	3
(Italy) Roberta Beltrame	6	3
(Australia) Trish McClenaughan	8	6
(United States) Peaches Bartkowicz	8	3
(United States) Tory Fretz	10	6
(Sweden) Katarina Bartholdson	3	1
(Czechoslovakia) Jitka Volavková	6	6
(United Kingdom) Diana Bennett	3	9
Q	(Australia) Carol Sherriff	6	11
(Italy) Lea Pericoli	6	6
(West Germany) Heide Schildknecht	4	3

Second round
3	(Australia) L Turner	6	6
(Australia) G Sherriff	1	3
(United States) K Blake	6	5	2
(Australia) T McClenaughan	4	7	6
(United States) T Fretz	6	6
(Czechoslovakia) J Volavková	4	4
Q	(Australia) C Sherriff	4	6	7
(Italy) L Pericoli	6	3	9

Third round
3	(Australia) L Turner	7	6
(Australia) T McClenaughan	5	2
(United States) T Fretz	6	6	4
(Italy) L Pericoli	8	3	6

Fourth round
3	(Australia) L Turner	6	6
(Italy) L Pericoli	0	4

==== Section 4 ====
First round
5	(United States) Billie Jean Moffitt	6	6
Q	(Netherlands) Elsie Spruyt	2	3
(United Kingdom) Liz Starkie	4	6	6
(Australia) Fay Toyne	6	4	2
(Australia) Jill Blackman	6	6
(United Kingdom) Vivienne Dennis	2	1
(Netherlands) Betty Stöve	3	6	6
(France) Isabelle de Lansalut	6	1	8
Q	(Netherlands) Elly Krocké	7	6
(South Africa) Vivienne Wiggill	5	1
(Austria) Sonja Pachta	2	6	6
Q	(United Kingdom) Sue Tutt	6	2	1
(United Kingdom) Lorna Cawthorn	9	6
(Australia) Dorothy Whitely	7	3
(Australia) Robin Lesh	6	6
(United States) Carol-Ann Prosen	0	4

Second round
5	(United States) BJ Moffitt	6	6
(United Kingdom) E Starkie	3	3
(Australia) J Blackman	6	6
(France) I de Lansalut	3	2
Q	(Netherlands) E Krocké	6	6
(Austria) S Pachta	2	1
(United Kingdom) L Cawthorn	1	0
(Australia) R Lesh	6	6

Third round
5	(United States) BJ Moffitt	7	12
(Australia) J Blackman	5	10
Q	(Netherlands) E Krocké	2	4
(Australia) R Lesh	6	6

Fourth round
5	(United States) BJ Moffitt	6	6
(Australia) R Lesh	2	0

=== Bottom half ===
==== Section 5 ====
First round
(United States) Julie Heldman	2	6	6
(Netherlands) Jenny Ridderhof-Seven	6	0	0
Q	(United Kingdom) Ruth Illingworth	4	11
(United Kingdom) Ann Owen	6	13
(United Kingdom) Mary McAnally	3	3
(United Kingdom) Robin Lloyd	6	6
(Spain) Pilar Barril	5	1
(Italy) Lucia Bassi	7	6
Q	(United Kingdom) Anthea Rigby	2	3
(Soviet Union) Anna Dmitrieva	6	6
(United Kingdom) Jill Mills	2	1
(Australia) Judy Tegart	6	6
(Italy) Silvana Lazzarino	0	0
(United Kingdom) Christine Truman	6	6
(Rhodesia) Pat Walkden	5	8	2
6	(United States) Carole Graebner	7	6	6

Second round
(United States) J Heldman	6	6
(United Kingdom) A Owen	1	1
(United Kingdom) R Lloyd	6	6
(Italy) L Bassi	1	1
(Soviet Union) A Dmitrieva	4	6	6
(Australia) J Tegart	6	4	8
(United Kingdom) C Truman	5	8	6
6	(United States) C Graebner	7	6	1

Third round
(United States) J Heldman	6	6
(United Kingdom) R Lloyd	2	2
(Australia) J Tegart	4	2
(United Kingdom) C Truman	6	6

Fourth round
(United States) J Heldman	6	2	3
(United Kingdom) C Truman	3	6	6

==== Section 6 ====
First round
(France) Rosie Darmon	2	6
(United Kingdom) Joyce Williams	6	8
(Sweden) Ingrid Löfdahl	1	6	8
(France) Jacqueline Rees-Lewis	6	3	6
(West Germany) Edda Buding	6	3	1
(United Kingdom) Nell Truman	4	6	6
(Czechoslovakia) Vlasta Vopičková	1	1
(United Kingdom) Carole Rosser	6	6
Q	(United Kingdom) Rosemary Deloford	6	6
(West Germany) Almut Sturm	4	4
Q	(United Kingdom) Margaret O'Donnell	6	6
(Canada) Vicki Berner	3	1
(South Africa) Heather Segal	4	2
(United Kingdom) Pauline Roberts	6	6
(South Africa) Esmé Emmanuel	0	5
4	(United States) Nancy Richey	6	7

Second round
(United Kingdom) J Williams	6	6
(Sweden) I Löfdahl	1	4
(United Kingdom) E Truman	2	8
(United Kingdom) C Rosser	6	10
Q	(United Kingdom) R Deloford	6	6
Q	(United Kingdom) M O'Donnell	4	2
(United Kingdom) P Roberts	4	3
4	(United States) N Richey	6	6

Third round
(United Kingdom) J Williams	3	6	6
(United Kingdom) C Rosser	6	2	2
Q	(United Kingdom) R Deloford	1	0
4	(United States) N Richey	6	6

Fourth round
(United Kingdom) J Williams	0	3
4	(United States) N Richey	6	6

==== Section 7 ====
First round

Second round
(United States) Justina Bricka	7	6
(Italy) Francesca Gordigiani	5	2
(France) Monique Salfati	6	7
(Norway) Liv Paldan	1	5
(United Kingdom) Virginia Wade	6	6
(France) Márta Peterdy-Wolf	1	3
(Belgium) Christiane Mercelis	6	1	3
LL	(France) Michelle Boulle	3	6	6

Third round
(United States) J Bricka	6	3	7
(France) M Salfati	2	6	5
(United Kingdom) V Wade	6	6
LL	(France) M Boulle	0	2

Fourth round
(United States) J Bricka	5	6	8
(United Kingdom) V Wade	7	4	6

==== Section 8 ====
First round

Second round
(Sweden) Ulla Sandulf	4	3
Q	(United Kingdom) Frances MacLennan	6	6
(West Germany) Helga Niessen	3	1
(United Kingdom) Margaret Lee	6	6
(United Kingdom) Rita Bentley	4	7	9
(Netherlands) Trudy Groenman	6	5	7
(Austria) Maria Leyrer	0	1
2	(Australia) Margaret Smith	6	6

Third round
Q	(United Kingdom) F MacLennan	6	6
(United Kingdom) M Lee	3	4
(United Kingdom) R Bentley	0	1
2	(Australia) M Smith	6	6

Fourth round
Q	(United Kingdom) F MacLennan	2	1
2	(Australia) M Smith	6	6

Preceded by 1965 French Championships – Women's singles	Grand Slam women's singles	Succeeded by 1965 U.S. National Championships – Women's singles
