= 1964 in tennis =

This page covers all the important events in the sport of tennis in 1964. It provides the results of notable tournaments throughout the year on both the men's and women's ILTF tennis circuits.

== Australian Open ==
Category	Champion(s)	Finalist(s)	Score
Men's singles	(Australia) Roy Emerson	(Australia) Fred Stolle	6–3, 6–4, 6–2
Women's singles	(Australia) Margaret Smith	(Australia) Lesley Turner	6–3, 6–2
Men's doubles	(Australia) Bob Hewitt (Australia) Fred Stolle	(Australia) Roy Emerson (Australia) Ken Fletcher	6–4, 7–5, 3–6, 4–6, 14–12
Women's doubles	(Australia) Judy Tegart (Australia) Lesley Turner	(Australia) Robyn Ebbern (Australia) Margaret Smith	6–4, 6–4
Mixed doubles	(Australia) Margaret Smith (Australia) Ken Fletcher	(Australia) Jan Lehane (United Kingdom) Mike Sangster	6–3, 6–2

== French Open ==
Category	Champion(s)	Finalist(s)	Score
Men's singles	(Spain) Manuel Santana	(Italy) Nicola Pietrangeli	6–3, 6–1, 4–6, 7–5
Women's singles	(Australia) Margaret Smith	(Brazil) Maria Bueno	5–7, 6–1, 6–2
Men's doubles	(Australia) Roy Emerson (Australia) Ken Fletcher	(Australia) John Newcombe (Australia) Tony Roche	7–5, 6–3, 3–6, 7–5
Women's doubles	(Australia) Margaret Smith (Australia) Lesley Turner	(Argentina) Norma Baylon (West Germany) Helga Schultze	6–3, 6–1
Mixed doubles	(Australia) Margaret Smith (Australia) Ken Fletcher	(Australia) Lesley Turner (Australia) Fred Stolle	6–3, 4–6, 8–6

== Wimbledon ==
Category	Champion(s)	Finalist(s)	Score
Men's singles	(Australia) Roy Emerson	(Australia) Fred Stolle	6–1, 12–10, 4–6, 6–3
Women's singles	(Brazil) Maria Bueno	(Australia) Margaret Smith	6–4, 7–9, 6–3
Men's doubles	(Australia) Bob Hewitt (Australia) Fred Stolle	(Australia) Roy Emerson (Australia) Ken Fletcher	7–5, 11–9, 6–4
Women's doubles	(Australia) Margaret Smith (Australia) Lesley Turner	(United States) Billie Jean Moffitt (United States) Karen Susman	7–5, 6–2
Mixed doubles	(Australia) 'Fred Stolle (Australia) Lesley Turner	(Australia) Ken Fletcher (Australia) Margaret Smith	6–4, 6–4

== US Open ==
Category	Champion(s)	Finalist(s)	Score
Men's singles	(Australia) Roy Emerson	(Australia) Fred Stolle	6–4, 6–1, 6–4
Women's singles	(Brazil) Maria Bueno	(United States) Carole Caldwell Graebner	6–1, 6–0
Men's doubles	(United States) Chuck McKinley (United States) Dennis Ralston	(United Kingdom) Graham Stilwell (United Kingdom) Mike Sangster	6–3, 6–2, 6–4
Women's doubles	(United States) Billie Jean Moffitt (United States) Karen Susman	(Australia) Margaret Smith (Australia) Lesley Turner	3–6, 6–2, 6–4
Mixed doubles	(Australia) Margaret Smith (Australia) John Newcombe	(Australia) Judy Tegart (United States) Ed Rubinoff	10–8, 4–6, 6–3
