= 1964 Wimbledon Championships – Women's singles =

Women's singles
- 1964 Wimbledon Championships

Final
- Champion: (Brazil) Maria Bueno
- Runner-up: (Australia) Margaret Smith
- Score: 6–4, 7–9, 6–3

Details
- Draw: 96 (10 Q )
- Seeds: 8

Events
Singles	men	women		boys	girls
Doubles	men	women	mixed	boys	girls
← 1963 ·	Wimbledon Championships	· 1965 →

Maria Bueno defeated the defending champion Margaret Smith in the final, 6–4, 7–9, 6–3 to win the ladies' singles tennis title at the 1964 Wimbledon Championships.

== Seeds ==
1. (Australia) Margaret Smith (final)
2. (Brazil) Maria Bueno (champion)
3. (United States) Billie Jean Moffitt (semifinals)
4. (Australia) Lesley Turner (semifinals)
5. (United States) Nancy Richey (quarterfinals)
6. (United Kingdom) Ann Jones (quarterfinals)
7. (Australia) Jan Lehane (third round)
8. (Australia) Robyn Ebbern (quarterfinals)

Click on the seed number of a player to go to their draw section.

== Draw ==
=== Key ===
- Q = Qualifier
- WC = Wild card
- LL = Lucky loser
- Alt = Alternate
- SE = Special exempt
- PR = Protected ranking
- ITF = ITF entry
- JE = Junior exempt
- w/o = Walkover
- r = Retired
- d = Defaulted
- SR = Special ranking

=== Finals ===
Quarterfinals
1	(Australia) Margaret Smith	6	2
(Argentina) Norma Baylon	0	0^{r}
3	(United States) Billie Jean Moffitt	6	6
6	(United Kingdom) Ann Jones	3	3
5	(United States) Nancy Richey	3	4
4	(Australia) Lesley Turner	6	6
8	(Australia) Robyn Ebbern	4	1
2	(Brazil) Maria Bueno	6	6

Semifinals
1	(Australia) Margaret Smith	6	6
3	(United States) Billie Jean Moffitt	3	4
4	(Australia) Lesley Turner	6	4	4
2	(Brazil) Maria Bueno	3	6	6

Final
1	(Australia) Margaret Smith	4	9	3
2	(Brazil) Maria Bueno	6	7	6

=== Top half ===
==== Section 1 ====
First round

Second round
1	(Australia) Margaret Smith	6	6
(South Africa) Annette Van Zyl	2	1
(United States) Karen Susman	4	6	7
(Soviet Union) Anna Dmitrieva	6	3	5
(Italy) Francesca Gordigiani	6	6
Q	(United Kingdom) Margaret O'Donnell	4	2
(Sweden) Katarina Bartholdson	6	5	0
(Netherlands) Anja Lepoutre	4	7	6

Third round
1	(Australia) M Smith	11	6
(United States) K Susman	9	0
(Italy) F Gordigiani	3	6	1
(Netherlands) A Lepoutre	6	4	6

Fourth round
1	(Australia) M Smith	6	6
(Netherlands) A Lepoutre	1	1

==== Section 2 ====
First round

Second round
7	(Australia) Jan Lehane	6	6
(France) Françoise Dürr	2	1
(Spain) Carmen Coronado	4	2
(Argentina) Norma Baylon	6	6
(West Germany) Helga Niessen	2	6	6
(France) Rosie Darmon	6	4	4
(United Kingdom) Deidre Catt	6	6
(Czechoslovakia) Věra Suková	4	2

Third round
7	(Australia) J Lehane	3	6	5
(Argentina) N Baylon	6	2	7
(West Germany) H Niessen	4	0
(United Kingdom) D Catt	6	6

Fourth round
(Argentina) N Baylon	4	6	6
(United Kingdom) D Catt	6	0	3

==== Section 3 ====
First round
3	(United States) Billie Jean Moffitt	7	4	6
(Italy) Roberta Beltrame	5	6	3
(United States) Donna Fales	6	6
(Australia) Fay Toyne	3	1
(United Kingdom) Margaret Lee	6	4	6
LL	(United Kingdom) Alison Stroud	4	6	4
(Spain) Ana María Estalella	2	3
Q	(United Kingdom) Diane Tuckey	6	6
(United States) Cathy Lee Crosby	1	3
(France) Jacqueline Rees-Lewis	6	6
(United Kingdom) Jean Knight	6	2
(South Africa) Heather Segal	8	6
Q	(United Kingdom) Frances Walton	6	3	0
(United Kingdom) Caroline Yates-Bell	2	6	6
(Italy) Lea Pericoli	6	6
(United Kingdom) Heather Allen	2	2

Second round
3	(United States) BJ Moffitt	6	6
(United States) D Fales	2	2
(United Kingdom) M Lee	6	7
Q	(United Kingdom) D Tuckey	3	5
(France) J Rees-Lewis	4	6	6
(South Africa) H Segal	6	4	4
(United Kingdom) C Yates-Bell	1	3
(Italy) L Pericoli	6	6

Third round
3	(United States) BJ Moffitt	3	6	6
(United Kingdom) M Lee	6	4	2
(France) J Rees-Lewis	1	6	7
(Italy) L Pericoli	6	1	5

Fourth round
3	(United States) BJ Moffitt	6	6
(France) J Rees-Lewis	4	4

==== Section 4 ====
First round
6	(United Kingdom) Ann Jones	6	6
(United States) Linda Lou Crosby	0	0
Q	(Republic of Ireland) Geraldine Houlihan	6	5	9
(United Kingdom) Robin Lloyd	4	7	11
(United Kingdom) Lorna Cawthorn	0	6	4
(United Kingdom) Pauline Roberts	6	3	6
(France) Isabelle de Lansalut	6	6
(United Kingdom) Carole Rosser	8	8
Q	(Netherlands) Betty Stöve	6	6
Q	(Australia) Trish McClenaughan	4	3
(United Kingdom) Joyce Williams	2	1
(Australia) Judy Tegart	6	6
(United States) Tory Fretz	6	6
(West Germany) Helga Schultze	2	4
(United States) Mary Habicht	4	6	3
Q	(West Germany) Heide Schildknecht	6	0	6

Second round
6	(United Kingdom) A Jones	6	7
(United Kingdom) R Lloyd	1	5
(United Kingdom) P Roberts	4	4
(United Kingdom) C Rosser	6	6
Q	(Netherlands) B Stöve	2	1
(Australia) J Tegart	6	6
(United States) T Fretz	7	3	6
Q	(West Germany) H Schildknecht	5	6	1

Third round
6	(United Kingdom) A Jones	6	6
(United Kingdom) C Rosser	1	0
(Australia) J Tegart	6	6
(United States) T Fretz	2	1

Fourth round
6	(United Kingdom) A Jones	10	6
(Australia) J Tegart	8	3

=== Bottom half ===
==== Section 5 ====
First round
(Austria) Sonja Pachta	6	8
(United States) Stephanie DeFina	3	6
(West Germany) Renate Ostermann	4	1
(United Kingdom) Rita Bentley	6	6
(United States) Judy Alvarez	0	8	7
(France) Janine Lieffrig	6	6	5
(South Africa) Jenny Garner	7	2
(United Kingdom) Virginia Wade	9	6
(United Kingdom) Jenny Trewby	6	6
LL	(United Kingdom) Enid Kerr	1	3
(United Kingdom) Liz Starkie	6	6
Q	(South Africa) Marie Fourie	2	3
(South Africa) Renée Haygarth	6	6
(United Kingdom) Mary McAnally	3	2
(United States) Justina Bricka	0	2
5	(United States) Nancy Richey	6	6

Second round
(Austria) S Pachta	3	3
(United Kingdom) R Bentley	6	6
(United States) J Alvarez	7	6	8
(United Kingdom) V Wade	9	3	6
(United Kingdom) J Trewby	1	2
(United Kingdom) E Starkie	6	6
(South Africa) R Haygarth	1	2
5	(United States) N Richey	6	6

Third round
(United Kingdom) R Bentley	2	3
(United States) J Alvarez	6	6
(United Kingdom) E Starkie	1	8
5	(United States) N Richey	6	10

Fourth round
(United States) J Alvarez	2	2
5	(United States) N Richey	6	6

==== Section 6 ====
First round
(Netherlands) Jenny Ridderhof-Seven	8	2
(South Africa) Glenda Swan	10	6
(United Kingdom) Vivienne Dennis	1
(Hungary) Zsuzsa Körmöczy	0^{r}
(Italy) Maria Teresa Riedl	2	6	2
(Sweden) Gudrun Rosin	6	4	6
(United States) Peachy Kellmeyer	6	9
Q	(United Kingdom) Ann Owen	4	7
(United States) Mary-Ann Eisel	7	6
(United Kingdom) Hazel Cheadle	5	1
(Australia) Robin Lesh	6	6
(United Kingdom) Nell Truman	3	3
(United States) Carol Hanks	6	6
(United Kingdom) Elaine Shenton	3	3
(United Kingdom) Judy Tee	3	3
4	(Australia) Lesley Turner	6	6

Second round
(South Africa) G Swan	6	7
(United Kingdom) V Dennis	2	5
(Sweden) G Rosin	6	6
(United States) P Kellmeyer	1	2
(United States) M-A Eisel	0	6	6
(Australia) R Lesh	6	2	2
(United States) C Hanks	2	0
4	(Australia) L Turner	6	6

Third round
(South Africa) G Swan	6	6
(Sweden) G Rosin	4	4
(United States) M-A Eisel	3	2
4	(Australia) L Turner	6	6

Fourth round
(South Africa) G Swan	0	7	2
4	(Australia) L Turner	6	5	6

==== Section 7 ====
First round

Second round
(Sweden) Ulla Sandulf
(United Kingdom) Christine Truman	w/o
(United States) Carole Caldwell	6	6
Q	(Australia) Helen Plaisted	3	4
(Australia) Madonna Schacht	6	6
(West Germany) Almut Sturm	4	3
(France) Monique Salfati	2	4
8	(Australia) Robyn Ebbern	6	6

Third round
(Sweden) U Sandulf	2	2
(United States) C Caldwell	6	6
(Australia) M Schacht	3	2
8	(Australia) R Ebbern	6	6

Fourth round
(United States) C Caldwell	4	0
8	(Australia) R Ebbern	6	6

==== Section 8 ====
First round

Second round
(United States) Victoria Palmer	6	2	4
(Netherlands) Trudy Groenman	2	6	6
(Czechoslovakia) Vlasta Kodešová	6	4	6
(Spain) Pilar Barril	4	6	1
(Norway) Liv Paldan	1	2
(Belgium) Christiane Mercelis	6	6
(United States) Carol-Ann Prosen	0	3
2	(Brazil) Maria Bueno	6	6

Third round
(Netherlands) G Groenman	6	6
(Czechoslovakia) V Kodešová	4	2
(Belgium) C Mercelis	1	1
2	(Brazil) M Bueno	6	6

Fourth round
(Netherlands) G Groenman	1	1
2	(Brazil) M Bueno	6	6

Preceded by 1964 French Championships – Women's singles	Grand Slam women's singles	Succeeded by 1964 U.S. National Championships – Women's singles
