= 1964 Wimbledon Championships – Boys' singles =

Boys' singles
- 1964 Wimbledon Championships

Final
- Champion: (United Arab Republic) Ismail El Shafei
- Runner-up: (Soviet Union) Vladimir Korotkov
- Score: 6–2, 6–3

Events
Singles	men	women		boys	girls
Doubles	men	women	mixed	boys	girls
← 1963 ·	Wimbledon Championships	· 1965 →

Ismail El Shafei defeated Vladimir Korotkov in the final, 6–2, 6–3 to win the boys' singles tennis title at the 1964 Wimbledon Championships.

== Draw ==
=== Key ===
- Q = Qualifier
- WC = Wild card
- LL = Lucky loser
- Alt = Alternate
- SE = Special exempt
- PR = Protected ranking
- ITF = ITF entry
- JE = Junior exempt
- w/o = Walkover
- r = Retired
- d = Defaulted
- SR = Special ranking

=== Finals ===
Semifinals
(United Arab Republic) Ismail El Shafei	6	6
(Czechoslovakia) Jan Kodeš	0	1
(Thailand) Felix Bautista	2	3
(Soviet Union) Vladimir Korotkov	6	6

Final
(United Arab Republic) Ismail El Shafei	6	6
(Soviet Union) Vladimir Korotkov	2	3

=== Top half ===
First round
(West Germany) Hans-Jürgen Pohmann	9	6
(Spain) Juan Guerrero	7	1
(Austria) Rudolf Hoskowetz	3	3
(Socialist Federal Republic of Yugoslavia) M Mincek	6	6
(United Kingdom) Peter Moores	6	6
(Norway) B Gregard	1	4
(Denmark) S Johansen	1	4
(Czechoslovakia) Jan Kodeš	6	6
(United States) Lamar Roemer	6	8
(Argentina) P Krom	1	6

Second round
(Hong Kong) Jerry Sung	6	2	8
(Rhodesia) Sheridan Towers	2	6	6
(United Arab Republic) Ismail El Shafei	6	6
(West Germany) H-J Pohmann	4	4
(Socialist Federal Republic of Yugoslavia) M Mincek	1	1
(United Kingdom) P Moores	6	6
(Czechoslovakia) J Kodeš	6	6
(United States) L Roemer	4	3

Quarterfinals
(Hong Kong) J Sung	0	1
(United Arab Republic) I El Shafei	6	6
(United Kingdom) P Moores	1	7
(Czechoslovakia) J Kodeš	6	9

Semifinals
(United Arab Republic) I El Shafei	6	6
(Czechoslovakia) J Kodeš	0	1

=== Bottom half ===
First round
(France) Jean-Baptiste Chanfreau	6	7
(Senegal) Y Smith	2	5
(Thailand) Felix Bautista	6	6
(Greece) Nicolas Kelaidis	1	3
(Poland) Bronisław Lewandowski	4	6	6
(India) BM Balasubramanian	6	0	4
(Switzerland) A Baumann	6	6
(Finland) H Talastera	1	2
(Pakistan) Manny Iqbal	2	6
(Belgium) Patrick Hombergen	6	8

Second round
(France) J-B Chanfreau	3	7
(Thailand) F Bautista	6	9
(Poland) B Lewandowski	6	6
(Switzerland) A Baumann	3	1
(Belgium) P Hombergen	6	9
(Republic of Ireland) Frank McArdle	2	7
(Soviet Union) Vladimir Korotkov	6	6
(Sudan) A Talaat	0	0

Quarterfinals
(Thailand) F Bautista	6	6
(Poland) B Lewandowski	2	3
(Belgium) P Hombergen	5	6
(Soviet Union) V Korotkov	7	8

Semifinals
(Thailand) F Bautista	2	3
(Soviet Union) V Korotkov	6	6
