= Scottish Hard Court Championships =

Defunct tennis tournament
- Tour: Pre-open era (1877–1967); Open era (1968–70)
- Founded: 1923
- Abolished: 1994
- Editions: 65
- Location: St Andrews, Fife, Scotland (1923–1981), Broughty Ferry, Dundee, Scotland (1982–94)
- Venue: St. Andrews LTC (1923–1981, Fort Hill Tennis Club (1982–94)
- Surface: Clay/Outdoor

The Scottish Hard Court Championships its original name also called Scottish Hard Championships was a tennis event held from 1923 through 1994 in Scotland.

== History ==
The Scottish Hard Court Championships was first played at the St Andrews Lawn Tennis Club, Kinburn Park St Andrews, Fife, Scotland on outdoor clay courts in 1923 and remained there until 1981 when it changed location to Fort Hill Tennis Club, Broughty Ferry, Dundee for the remainder of its run. The tournament featured both men's and women's singles competition as well as same sex and mixed doubles the tournament survived for a period of 71 years until 1994.

== Finals ==
=== Men's singles ===
(incomplete roll)

| Year | Champions | Runners-up | Score |
|---|---|---|---|
| 1923 | (United Kingdom) G. M. Elliott | (United Kingdom) E. C. McIntosh | 6–2, 6–3, 4–6, 5–7, 6–3 |
| 1924 | (United Kingdom) Alex Blair | (United Kingdom) E. C. McIntosh | 4–6, 6–3, 6–3, 5–7, 7–5 |
| 1925 | (United Kingdom) E. C. McIntosh | (United Kingdom) Arthur W. Hill | 6–1, 6–3, 6–4 |
| 1926 | (United Kingdom) Brame Hillyard | (United Kingdom) G. M. Elliott | 6–4, 7–5, 6–3 |
| 1927 | (United Kingdom) Henry Hunter | (United Kingdom) D. R. Hamilton | 4–6, 6–1, 7–5, 5–7, 8–6 |
| 1928 | (United Kingdom) Harvey MacKintosh | (United Kingdom) Arthur W. Hill | 6–0, 6–4, 6–3 |
| 1929 | (United Kingdom) Arthur W. Hill | (United Kingdom) R. W. Dunsire | 6–4, 6–2, 6–3 |
| 1930 | (United Kingdom) Arthur W. Hill | (United Kingdom) J. T. Hill | 6–2, 6–4, 6–3 |
| 1931 | (United Kingdom) Arthur W. Hill | (United Kingdom) Ian Collins | 3–6, 6–2, 6–4, 6–2 |
| 1932 | (United Kingdom) Ian Collins | (United Kingdom) Donald MacPhail | 6–0, 6–0, 6–3 |
| 1933 | (United Kingdom) Ian Collins | (United Kingdom) S. N. Grossman | 6–2 6–3 |
| 1934 | (United Kingdom) Ian Collins | (United Kingdom) Nigel Sharpe | 7–5 10–8 |
| 1935 | (United Kingdom) Ian Collins | (United Kingdom) Donald MacPhail | 7–5 6–1 6–3 |
| 1936 | (New Zealand) Buster Andrews | (United Kingdom) Ian Collins | 6–4, 10–8, 6–1 |
| 1937 | (United Kingdom) Donald MacPhail | (United Kingdom) Ian Collins | 6–4, 6–4, 6–3 |
| 1938 | (United Kingdom) Donald MacPhail | (United Kingdom) Ian Collins | 7–5, 6–3 |
| 1939 | (United Kingdom) Ian Collins | (United Kingdom) J. F. Morton | 6–1, 6–2 |
| 1940/1945 | Not held (due to World War II) | | |
| 1946 | (Poland) Tadeusz A. (Ted) Slawek | (United Kingdom) Fergus Davidson | 4–6, 6–3, 6–2 |
| 1947 | (New Zealand) Owen M. Bold | (Poland) Tadeusz A. (Ted) Slawek | 6–4, 4–6, 6–3 |
| 1948 | (United Kingdom) Clarence Medlycott Jones | (United Kingdom) Howard F. Walton | Title divided |
| 1949 | (Argentina) Heraldo Weiss | (Poland) Tadeusz A. (Ted) Slawek | 6–2, 6–0 |
| 1950 | (Poland) Ignacy Tłoczyński | (United Kingdom) Donald (Don) Butler | 6–0, 8–6 |
| 1951 | (Poland) Ignacy Tłoczyński | (South Africa) Owen Williams | 6–3, 6–0 |
| 1952 | (Poland) Ignacy Tłoczyński | ? | ? |
| 1953 | (Southern Rhodesia) Don Black | (Italy) J. Prouse | 6–1, 6–1 |
| 1954 | (United Kingdom) Philip Wooldridge | (United Kingdom) Alan Mills | 3–6, 6–4, 6–1 |
| 1955 | (United Kingdom) Alan Mills | (South Africa) Pierre T. Vercueil | 6–3, 8–6, 6–3 |
| 1956 | (United Kingdom) Alan Mills | (United Kingdom) Colin Baxter | 6–3, 6–1 |
| 1957 | (United Kingdom) Geoffrey Lane Paish | (United Kingdom) Colin Baxter | 6–3, 6–4 |
| 1958 | (United Kingdom) G. L. Paish | (United Kingdom) Colin Baxter | 6–3, 6–4 |
| 1959 | (United Kingdom) Colin Baxter | (United Kingdom) M. Harvey | 6–3, 8–6 |
| 1960 | (South Africa) Basil Wheeler | (United Kingdom) John R. Maguire | 6–1, 8–6 |
| 1961 | (United Kingdom) James Irvine Tattersall | (Southern Rhodesia) Don Black | 6–4, 6–4 |
| 1962 | (South Africa) Frew McMillan | (United Kingdom) John R. Maguire | 6–1, 6–2 |
| 1963 | (Australia) Warren F. Jacques | (United Kingdom) Harry Stirling Matheson | 6–3 8–6 6–3 |
| 1964 | (United Kingdom) Harry Stirling Matheson | (Italy) J. Prouse | 6–4, 6–3 |
| 1965 | (United Kingdom) Alan Mills | (United Kingdom) Harry Stirling Matheson | 7–5, 6–4 |
| 1967 | (United Kingdom) William E. Dickson | (United Kingdom) H.D. Perkins | 6–4, 6–4 |
↓ Open era ↓
| 1968 | (United Kingdom) David Lloyd | ? | ? |
| 1969 | (United Kingdom) David Lloyd | (United Kingdom) Drew Nicol | 6–2, 6–2 |
| 1970 | (New Zealand) Ian Beverley | (United Kingdom) Graeme Notman | 6–2, 6–2 |
| 1971 | (United Kingdom) David Lloyd | (United Kingdom) Graeme Notman | 6–2, 6–3 |
| 1974 | (United Kingdom) John Howie | ? | ? |
| 1976 | (United Kingdom) Graeme Notman | ? | ? |
| 1977 | (United Kingdom) Graeme Notman | (United Kingdom) John Howie | ? |
| 1979 | (United Kingdom) Ken. M. Revie | ? | ? |
| 1980 | (United Kingdom) Keith Kordula | ? | ? |
| 1982 | (United Kingdom) Ken. M. Revie | ? | ? |
| 1983 | (United Kingdom) Ken. M. Revie | (United Kingdom) David Shaw | ? |
| 1985 | (United Kingdom) Keith Kordula | ? | ? |
| 1987 | (United Kingdom) Michael McGill | ? | ? |
| 1988 | (United Kingdom) Michael McGill | ? | ? |
| 1989 | (United Kingdom) Michael McGill | (United Kingdom) Ken Wood | ? |
| 1992 | (United Kingdom) Malcom Watt | ? | ? |
| 1993 | (United Kingdom) Jason Barnett | ? | ? |
| 1994 | (United Kingdom) Ken Wood | (United Kingdom) Jason Barnett | 2–6, 7–6, 6–4 |

=== Women's singles ===
(incomplete roll)

| Year | Champions | Runners-up | Score |
|---|---|---|---|
| 1923 | (United Kingdom) Mary Gray Welsh | (United Kingdom) M. Jenkins | 6–2, 6–0 |
| 1924 | (United Kingdom) Mary Gray Welsh | (United Kingdom) M. Little | 6–2, 6–0 |
| 1925 | (United Kingdom) Mary Gray Welsh | (United Kingdom) M. Herd | 6–4, 6–4 |
| 1926 | (United Kingdom) Jean Rankine | (United Kingdom) Jeanette Weir | 6–4, 10–8 |
| 1927 | (United Kingdom) Jessie Riddick | (United Kingdom) Nancy Grimond | 6–1, 6–0 |
| 1928 | (United Kingdom) Jean Rankine | (United Kingdom) Muriel Thomas | 6–3, 9–7 |
| 1929 | (Australia) Esna Boyd Robertson | (United Kingdom) Jean Rankine | 4–6, 6–1, 6–3 |
| 1930 | (Australia) Esna Boyd Robertson | (United Kingdom) Winifred Mason | 6–1, 7–5 |
| 1931 | (Australia) Esna Boyd Robertson | (United Kingdom) Geraldine Beamish | 6–3, 6–1 |
| 1932 | (Australia) Esna Boyd Robertson | (United Kingdom) Kathleen Robertson | 6–2, 6–2 |
| 1933 | (United Kingdom) Winifred Mason | (United Kingdom) Edie Rudd Luxton | 6–1, 6–4 |
| 1934 | (India) Olga Webb | (Australia) Esna Boyd Robertson | 4–6, 6–4, 10–8 |
| 1935 | (Australia) Esna Boyd Robertson | (United Kingdom) Lesley Hunter | 6–0, 5–7, 6–4 |
| 1936 | (Australia) Esna Boyd Robertson | (United Kingdom) Sheila Patterson | 7–5, 6–4 |
| 1937 | (India) Olga Webb McInnes | (Australia) Esna Boyd Robertson | 6–3, 6–2 |
| 1938 | (India) Olga Webb McInnes | (United Kingdom) Mollie Welsh | 7–5, 6–0 |
| 1939 | (Chile) Anita Lizana Ellis | (Australia) Esna Boyd Robertson | 6–3, 6–3 |
| 1940/1945 | Not held (due to World War II) | | |
| 1946 | (Chile) Anita Lizana Ellis | (United Kingdom) Mollie Welsh | 6–0, 6–1 |
| 1947 | (Chile) Anita Lizana Ellis | (United Kingdom) Dorothy Round Little | 6–1, 6–4 |
| 1948 | (United Kingdom) Molly Blair | (United Kingdom) Susan Partridge | 6–2, 7–5 |
| 1949 | (Argentina) Mary Terán de Weiss | (Chile) Anita Lizana Ellis | 6–4, 6–1 |
| 1950 | (Chile) Anita Lizana Ellis | (United Kingdom) Mrs Helen Proudfoot | 6–1, 6–1 |
| 1951 | (United Kingdom) Jean Trower | (United Kingdom) Margaret Emerson | 6–1, 7–9, 6–0 |
| 1952 | (Chile) Anita Lizana Ellis | (South Africa) Doreen Treadwell Wedderburn | 6–3, 6–3 |
| 1953 | (United Kingdom) Elaine M. Watson | (United Kingdom) Jean Petchell | 6–2, 3–6, 7–5 |
| 1954 | (United Kingdom) Heather Macfarlane | (United Kingdom) Billie Woodgate | 7–5, 8–6 |
| 1955 | (United Kingdom) Rita Bentley | (Chile) Anita Lizana Ellis | 7–5, 7–5 |
| 1956 | (United Kingdom) Sheila Armstrong | (United Kingdom) Heather Macfarlane | 6–3, 4–6, 6–4 |
| 1957 | (United Kingdom) Heather Macfarlane | (United Kingdom) A. Paterson | 6–3, 6–2 |
| 1958 | (United Kingdom) C. Leather | (United Kingdom) E. Walker | divided title |
| 1959 | (United Kingdom) Sheila Armstrong | (United Kingdom) Joyce Barclay | 6–1, 6–0 |
| 1960 | (United Kingdom) Lorna Cornell Cawthorn | (Australia) Margaret H. O'Donnell | 6–4, 7–5 |
| 1961 | (United Kingdom) Frances MacLennan | (United Kingdom) Ann McAlpine | 6–1, 6–3 |
| 1962 | (United Kingdom) Ann McAlpine | ? | ? |
| 1963 | (United Kingdom) Carole Rosser | (United Kingdom) Winnie Shaw | ? |
| 1964 | (Australia) Fay Toyne | (United Kingdom) Winnie Shaw | 6–1, 6–2 |
| 1965 | (United Kingdom) Carole Rosser | (United Kingdom) Winnie Shaw | 6–3, 6–4 |
| 1966 | (United Kingdom) Carole Rosser | ? | ? |
| 1967 | (United Kingdom) Sheila Moodie | ? | ? |
↓ Open era ↓
| 1968 | (United Kingdom) Sheila Moodie | ? | ? |
| 1969 | (United Kingdom) Marjorie Love | (United Kingdom) Gwen Armstrong | 6–0, 6–1 |
| 1970 | (United Kingdom) Linda McDonald | (United Kingdom) Sheila Moodie | 6–2, 6–2 |
| 1971 | (United Kingdom) Marjorie Love | (United Kingdom) Sheila Moodie | 8–6, 3–6, 6–4 |
| 1972 | (United Kingdom) Marjorie Love | ? | ? |
| 1973 | (United Kingdom) Marjorie Love | ? | ? |
| 1974 | (United Kingdom) Ruth Allen | (United Kingdom) Wendy Slaughter | 4–6, 6–2, 6–1 |
| 1975 | (United Kingdom) Ruth Allen | ? | ? |
| 1976 | (United Kingdom) Cathy Drury | (United Kingdom) Anne Hobbs | 6–4, 6–3 |
| 1977 | (United Kingdom) Judy Erskine | (United Kingdom) G. Armstrong | 6–2, 6–2 |
| 1978 | (United Kingdom) Suzanne Bakewell (United Kingdom) C. O'Brien | ? | divided title |
| 1979 | (United Kingdom) Judy Erskine | (United Kingdom) Elizabeth Locke | 4–6, 6–4, 6–1 |
| 1980 | (United Kingdom) Judy Erskine | ? | ? |
| 1981 | (United Kingdom) Judy Erskine | ? | ? |
| 1982 | (United Kingdom) Susan McCulloch | ? | ? |
| 1983 | (Australia) Vicki Marler | ? | ? |
| 1984 | (United Kingdom) L. Reid | ? | ? |
| 1985 | (United Kingdom) L. Reid | ? | ? |
| 1986 | (United Kingdom) Judy Erskine | ? | ? |
| 1987 | (United Kingdom) Susanne Mair | ? | ? |
| 1988 | (United Kingdom) Michelle Mair | ? | ? |
| 1989 | (United Kingdom) Heather Lockhart | ? | ? |
| 1990 | (United Kingdom) Michelle Mair | ? | ? |
| 1992 | (United Kingdom) Allison Wood | ? | ? |
| 1993 | (United Kingdom) Alison Reid | ? | ? |
| 1994 | (United Kingdom) Alison Reid | (United Kingdom) Allison Wood | 6–1, 6–2 |

== See also ==
- Tennis in Scotland
