= Larry Nagler =

American former tennis player

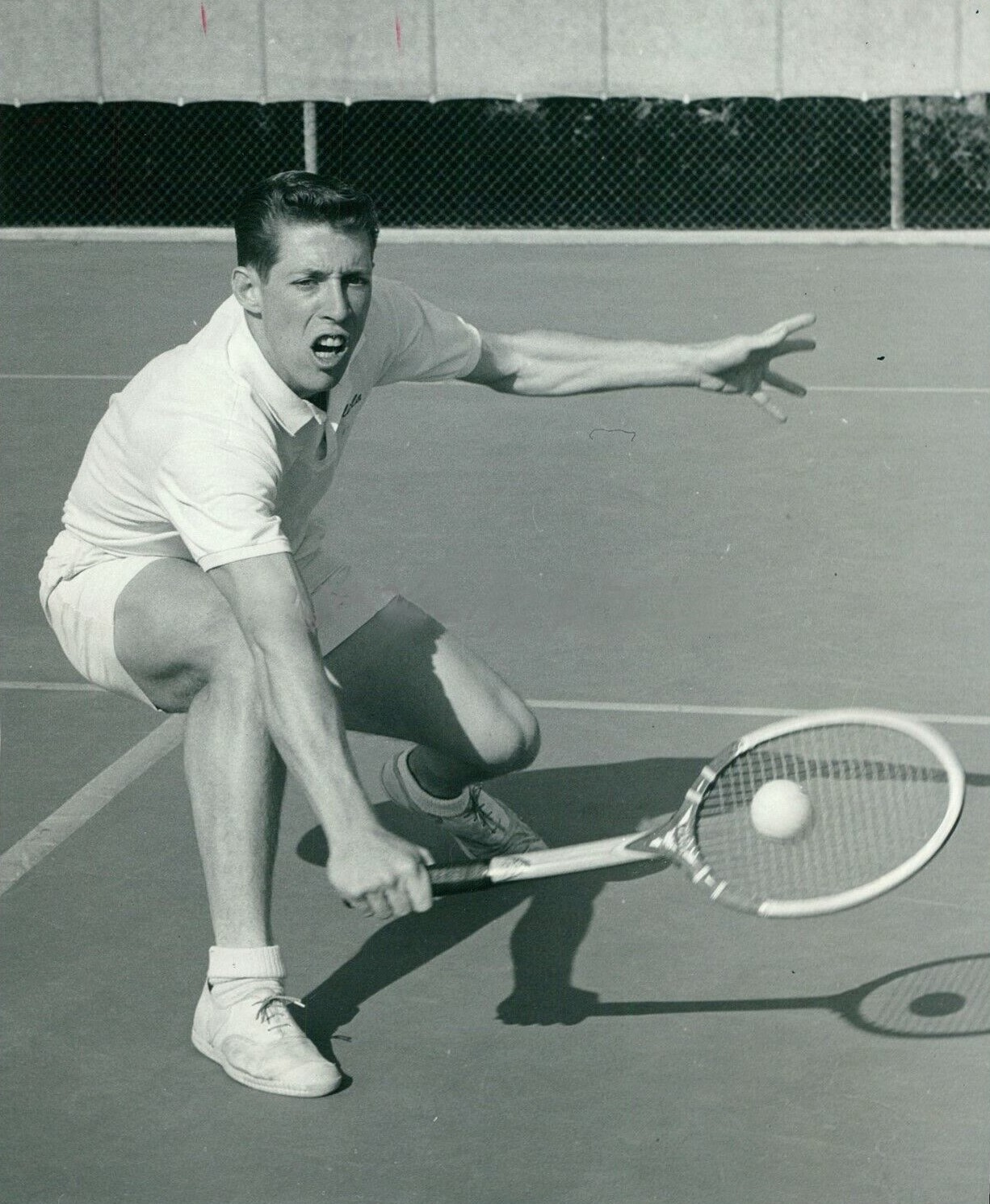
- Nagler in 1960
- Country (sports): United States
- Residence: Los Angeles, California, US
- Born: July 1, 1940 (age 86) Queens, New York, US
- College: University of California, Los Angeles (UCLA)

Grand Slam singles results
- Wimbledon: 1R (1964)
- US Open: 4R (1963)

Grand Slam doubles results
- Wimbledon: 2R (1964)
Medal record
Maccabiah Games
Gold medal – first place	1977 Israel	Men's Doubles
Silver medal – second place	1977 Israel	Men's Singles

Larry Nagler (born July 1, 1940) is an American former college and professional tennis player. In college, Nagler played on the UCLA Bruins men's basketball team for Hall of Fame coach John Wooden in 1958 and 1959. In tennis, he was the 1960 NCAA Tennis Singles Champion, and a 1960 NCAA Tennis Doubles Champion, with teammate Allen Fox. He also played doubles with Arthur Ashe, winning the 1962 Pennsylvania Lawn Tennis Championships. Nagler was a three-time Intercollegiate Tennis Association (ITA) First-Team All-American (1960–62), and was the only player to ever win three Pac-10 men's singles titles (1960–62). In 1962 he was ranked 11th in the United States in singles. He played singles in the 1964 Wimbledon Championships and played doubles in the 1964 Wimbledon Championships with Allen Fox. At the 1977 Maccabiah Games in Israel, he and Steve Krulevitz won gold medals in doubles for the United States, and he won a silver medal in men's singles. Nagler was inducted into the ITA Hall of Fame and the UCLA Athletics Hall of Fame.

== Early life ==
Nagler was born in Queens, New York, and is Jewish. He moved to Roslyn Heights, New York, when he was 10 years old. He attended The Wheatley School, a public high school, in Old Westbury, New York.

At 17 Nagler began attending the University of California, Los Angeles, (UCLA) at the urging of his best friend, tennis player Allen Fox, whom he had known since he was 13 years old. He earned a B.A. in political science at UCLA in 1962. He then attended UCLA Law School, where he earned a J.D. in 1965; he played tennis only in the summers during the time he was in law school. He lived at the time in his parents' home in North Hollywood, California.

== College career ==
Nagler described his relationship with Fox, who was UCLA's top player, as "We were bitter rivals and close friends." In turn, Fox recounted he "was psyched out by his speed on the court, his physical abilities, and his ferocious competitiveness." They were on the junior U.S. Davis Cup team together. Nagler recalled how: "Allen was a vicious competitor who hated to lose, especially to me. One year [1960] at UCLA I beat him in the singles final of the Ojai tournament. After he lost, he broke two racquets and sneered at me that he was going to throw the doubles finals. And I was his partner! He said he couldn’t stand for me to win another title. Sure enough, we lost to UCLA teammates we usually thrashed." Nagler and Fox won the doubles title at Ojai in 1961, defeating Bill Hoogs and Jim McManus.

As a sophomore, after going undefeated in singles tournaments, Nagler was also the 1960 NCAA Tennis Singles Champion, defeating Whitney Reed, the reigning NCAA champion, in the finals. He was also a 1960 NCAA Tennis Doubles Champion, with teammate Allen Fox. In 1961, he was ranked # 12 in the United States in singles, and # 8 in doubles with Allen Fox, by the United States Lawn Tennis Association. Nagler was UCLA's team captain in 1962.

Nagler was a three-time Intercollegiate Tennis Association (ITA) First-Team All-American (1960–62). He was also the only player to ever win three Pac-10 men's singles titles (1960–62).

=== Basketball ===
During his freshman and sophomore years at UCLA in 1958 and 1959, Nagler also played on the UCLA Bruins men's basketball team for Hall of Fame coach John Wooden. Nagler credited Wooden for his encouraging him to focus on tennis, rather than basketball.

== Professional career ==
Nagler won the 1962 Detroit Tennis Club invitational with doubles partner, and future Hall of Famer, Arthur Ashe, defeating Andy Lloyd and Don Russell. Nagler and Ashe also won the 1962 Pennsylvania Lawn Tennis Championships, defeating Bill Bond and Ramsey Earnhart in straight sets.

Ashe named Fox and Nagler as among his closest friends at UCLA and credited their relationship as helping Ashe to become more aware of Jews. In his memoir, Ashe recounted how he discovered his doubles partner was Jewish:

"One day, Nagler, my doubles partner, invited me to his house in Los Angeles. Lox and bagels, which I had never eaten before, were served. Suddenly I realized that Nagler, my doubles partner, was Jewish, and that his close friend Allen Fox was also Jewish. It was a revelation to me. I had thought of them simply as white. In those days, to be Jewish in the top ranks of tennis was to encounter a certain amount of prejudice."

— Arthur Ashe, Days of Grace, page 181

Ashe and Nagler thereafter had deep discussions about religion, race, and politics, which Ashe said "laid the foundation for my gratifying relationship as an adult with Jews and American Jewish culture.

In 1962 Nagler was ranked 11th in the United States in singles. He won the Middle Atlantic invitation grass courts championship, defeating Frank Froehling.

Nagler played doubles in the 1964 Wimbledon Championships with Allen Fox. They defeated Gerry Oakley and Humphrey Truman of the United Kingdom in the first round, but lost to Naresh Kumar of India and Jiří Javorský of Czechoslovakia in the second round. He also played singles in the 1964 Wimbledon Championships, losing in the first round to # 4 seed and future Hall of Famer Rafael Osuna.

At the 1977 Maccabiah Games in Israel, Nagler and Steve Krulevitz were partners and won gold medals in doubles for the United States. He won a silver medal in men's singles, losing in the finals to Krulevitz.

== Legacy ==
Nagler was inducted into the Wheatley School Hall of Fame in 1983, with the Hall noting that he had competed in tennis, basketball, and baseball. He was inducted into the ITA Hall of Fame in 2004. He was inducted into the UCLA Athletics Hall of Fame in 2011.

== Legal career ==
Nagler practices law in Los Angeles, California. He has represented, among others, tennis players Arthur Ashe and Tom Okker, and actor Sylvester Stallone. He was a Judge Pro Tem of the Beverly Hills Municipal Court and Los Angeles Municipal Court in 1976-78.

== See also ==
- List of notable Jewish tennis players
