= 1964 Wimbledon Championships – Girls' singles =

Girls' singles
- 1964 Wimbledon Championships

Final
- Champion: (United States) Peaches Bartkowicz
- Runner-up: (Mexico) Elena Subirats
- Score: 6–3, 6–1

Details
- Draw: 17

Events
Singles	men	women		boys	girls
Doubles	men	women	mixed	boys	girls
- Wimbledon Championships

Peaches Bartkowicz defeated Elena Subirats in the final, 6–3, 6–1 to win the girls' singles tennis title at the 1964 Wimbledon Championships.

== Draw ==
Key

- Q = Qualifier
- WC = Wild card
- LL = Lucky loser
- Alt = Alternate
- ITF = ITF entry
- PR = Protected ranking
- SR = Special ranking
- SE = Special exempt
- JE = Junior exempt
- JR = Junior Accelerator Programme entrant
- CO = College Accelerator Programme entrant
- NG = Next Gen Accelerator Program entrant
- w/o = Walkover
- r = Retired
- d = Defaulted

=== Finals ===
Semifinals
(Mexico) Elena Subirats	6	2	6
(West Germany) Karin Seltenreich	0	6	4
(United Kingdom) Winnie Shaw	7	0	3
(United States) Peaches Bartkowicz	5	6	6

Final
(Mexico) Elena Subirats	3	1
(United States) Peaches Bartkowicz	6	6

=== Top half ===
First round
(Denmark) Mari-Ann Bloch Jørgensen	6	6
(Sudan) MT Talaat	0	1

Second round
(Finland) Birgitta Lindström	7	6
(Switzerland) Silvia Gubler	5	3
(Mexico) Elena Subirats	7	6
(Norway) Ellen Grindvold	5	1
(Belgium) Ingrid Loeys	10	2	3
(France) Johanne Venturino	8	6	6
(West Germany) Karin Seltenreich	6	6
(Denmark) M-A Bloch Jørgensen	2	1

Quarterfinals
(Finland) B Lindström	4	1
(Mexico) E Subirats	6	6
(France) J Venturino	4	4
(West Germany) Karin Seltenreich	6	6

Semifinals
(Mexico) E Subirats	6	2	6
(West Germany) Karin Seltenreich	0	6	4

=== Bottom half ===
First round

Second round
(Argentina) Z Shreiber	0	2
(Netherlands) Lidy Venneboer	6	6
(United Kingdom) Winnie Shaw	6	6
(Hungary) E Szigeti	2	1
(Republic of Ireland) Patricia O'Gorman	4	9	6
(Austria) G Vyplasil	6	7	2
(Soviet Union) Alla Ivanova	3	6	4
(United States) Peaches Bartkowicz	6	3	6

Quarterfinals
(Netherlands) L Venneboer	3	4
(United Kingdom) W Shaw	6	6
(Republic of Ireland) Patricia O'Gorman	3	2
(United States) J Bartkowicz	6	6

Semifinals
(United Kingdom) W Shaw	7	0	3
(United States) J Bartkowicz	5	6	6
