= Lew Gerrard =

New Zealand tennis player

- Full name: Lewis Albert Gerrard
- Country (sports): New Zealand
- Born: 5 April 1938 (age 88) Auckland, New Zealand
- Plays: Right-handed

Singles
- Career record: 0–2

Grand Slam singles results
- Australian Open: QF (1966)
- French Open: 4R (1959)
- Wimbledon: 2R (1959, 1960, 1964)
- US Open: 4R (1960)

Doubles
- Career record: 1–2

Grand Slam doubles results
- Australian Open: 2R (1965, 1966)
- Wimbledon: SF (1964)

Grand Slam mixed doubles results
- Australian Open: 2R (1965)
- Wimbledon: 4R (1966)

Team competitions
- Davis Cup: SF^{Am} (1965)

Lewis Albert Gerrard (born 5 April 1938) is a former New Zealand international tennis player. He competed in the Davis Cup a number of times from 1957 to 1966. Gerrard won the New Zealand Championships five times in a row in the early 1960s.
