= 1960 NCAA tennis championships =

1960 NCAA Tennis Championships
- Date: June 1960
- Edition: 15th
- Location: Seattle, Washington
- Venue: University of Washington

Champions

Men's singles
- (United States) Larry Nagler (UCLA)

Men's doubles
- (United States) Larry Nagler / (United States) Allen Fox (UCLA)
← 1959 ·	NCAA Tennis Championships	· 1961 →

The 1960 NCAA Tennis Championships were the 15th annual NCAA-sponsored tournaments to determine the national champions of men's singles, doubles, and team collegiate tennis in the United States.

UCLA captured the team championship, the Bruins' sixth such title. UCLA finished eight points ahead of rivals USC in the final team standings (18–8). Either UCLA or USC would ultimately win the men's team title during each of the subsequent twelve seasons (1960-1971).

== Host site ==
This year's tournaments were contested at the University of Washington in Seattle, Washington.

== Team scoring ==
Until 1977, the men's team championship was determined by points awarded based on individual performances in the singles and doubles events.
