= 1964 Wimbledon Championships – Men's doubles =

Men's doubles
- 1964 Wimbledon Championships

Final
- Champions: (Australia) Bob Hewitt (Australia) Fred Stolle
- Runners-up: (Australia) Roy Emerson (Australia) Ken Fletcher
- Score: 4–6, 6–2, 6–2, 6–2

Details
- Draw: 64 (5 Q )
- Seeds: 4

Events
Singles	men	women		boys	girls
Doubles	men	women	mixed	boys	girls
← 1963 ·	Wimbledon Championships	· 1965 →

Rafael Osuna and Antonio Palafox were the defending champions, but lost in the semifinals to Bob Hewitt and Fred Stolle.

Hewitt and Stolle defeated Roy Emerson and Ken Fletcher in the final, 4–6, 6–2, 6–2, 6–2 to win the gentlemen's doubles tennis title at the 1964 Wimbledon Championship.

== Seeds ==
1. (United States) Chuck McKinley / (United States) Dennis Ralston (quarterfinals)
2. (Mexico) Rafael Osuna / (Mexico) Antonio Palafox (semifinals)
3. (Australia) Bob Hewitt / (Australia) Fred Stolle (champions)
4. (Australia) Roy Emerson / (Australia) Ken Fletcher (final)

Click on the seed number of a player to go to their draw section.

== Draw ==
=== Key ===
- Q = Qualifier
- WC = Wild card
- LL = Lucky loser
- Alt = Alternate
- ITF = ITF entry
- PR = Protected ranking
- SR = Special ranking
- SE = Special exempt
- JE = Junior exempt
- JR = Junior Accelerator Programme entrant
- CO = College Accelerator Programme entrant
- NG = Next Gen Accelerator Program entrant
- w/o = Walkover
- r = Retired
- d = Defaulted

=== Finals ===
Quarterfinals
1	(United States) Chuck McKinley (United States) Dennis Ralston	6	6	5	3	5
(New Zealand) Ian Crookenden (New Zealand) Lew Gerrard	4	2	7	6	7
4	(Australia) Roy Emerson (Australia) Ken Fletcher	6	6	8
(Australia) John Newcombe (Australia) Tony Roche	4	3	6
(United States) Clark Graebner (United States) Marty Riessen	2	4	6	2
3	(Australia) Bob Hewitt (Australia) Fred Stolle	6	6	3	6
(West Germany) Wilhelm Bungert (West Germany) Christian Kuhnke	3	3	6	5
2	(Mexico) Rafael Osuna (Mexico) Antonio Palafox	6	6	3	7

Semifinals
(New Zealand) Ian Crookenden (New Zealand) Lew Gerrard	12	2	1
4	(Australia) Roy Emerson (Australia) Ken Fletcher	14	6	6
3	(Australia) Bob Hewitt (Australia) Fred Stolle	6	6	6
2	(Mexico) Rafael Osuna (Mexico) Antonio Palafox	2	2	3

Final
4	(Australia) Roy Emerson (Australia) Ken Fletcher	5	9	4
3	(Australia) Bob Hewitt (Australia) Fred Stolle	7	11	6

=== Top half ===
==== Section 1 ====
First round
1	(United States) Chuck McKinley (United States) Dennis Ralston	6	6	6
LL	(Australia) John Keller (South Africa) Ray Weedon	2	4	3
Q	(Austria) Ernst Blanke (Austria) Detlev Herdy	5	6	3	2
(Australia) Bob Carmichael (Australia) Ronald McKenzie	7	3	6	6
(United Kingdom) Billy Knight (United Kingdom) Tony Pickard
(Socialist Federal Republic of Yugoslavia) Boro Jovanović (Socialist Federal Republic of Yugoslavia) Nikola Pilić	w/o
(South Africa) Frew McMillan (South Africa) Colin Zeeman	3	6	4	6	3
Q	(United Kingdom) Ted Beards (United Kingdom) Roy Dixon	6	3	6	4	6
(Netherlands) Jan Hajer (Netherlands) Tom Okker	6	6	6
(France) Jean Borotra (France) Gil de Kermadec	4	3	1
(New Zealand) Ian Crookenden (New Zealand) Lew Gerrard
(Hungary) István Gulyás (South Africa) Abe Segal	w/o
(Brazil) Carlos Fernandes (Brazil) José Edison Mandarino	2	2	2
(United Kingdom) Mike Sangster (United Kingdom) Bobby Wilson	6	6	6
(South Africa) Pat Cramer (South Africa) Bob Maud	2	3	6	8	8
(United Kingdom) Peter Moys (United Kingdom) John Ward	6	6	3	6	6

Second round
1	(United States) C McKinley (United States) D Ralston	6	6	6	6
(Australia) R Carmichael (Australia) R McKenzie	2	8	3	2
(United Kingdom) W Knight (United Kingdom) A Pickard	6	6	6
Q	(United Kingdom) E Beards (United Kingdom) R Dixon	2	4	2
(Netherlands) J Hajer (Netherlands) T Okker	2	7	5
(New Zealand) I Crookenden (New Zealand) L Gerrard	6	9	7
(United Kingdom) M Sangster (United Kingdom) R Wilson	6	6	6
(South Africa) P Cramer (South Africa) R Maud	3	4	2

Third round
1	(United States) C McKinley (United States) D Ralston	6	6	6
(United Kingdom) W Knight (United Kingdom) A Pickard	4	2	4
(New Zealand) I Crookenden (New Zealand) L Gerrard	9	6	9
(United Kingdom) M Sangster (United Kingdom) R Wilson	7	3	7

Quarterfinals
1	(United States) C McKinley (United States) D Ralston	6	6	5	3	5
(New Zealand) I Crookenden (New Zealand) L Gerrard	4	2	7	6	7

==== Section 2 ====
First round
4	(Australia) Roy Emerson (Australia) Ken Fletcher	6	6	6
(United States) Frank Froehling (United States) Charlie Pasarell	0	4	2
(South Africa) Clive Brebnor (Australia) John Hillebrand	6	6	8
(United Kingdom) Geoff Ward (United Kingdom) Ivor Warwick	4	3	6
(United Kingdom) Gerry Oakley (United Kingdom) Humphrey Truman	3	1	3
(United States) Allen Fox (United States) Larry Nagler	6	6	6
(Czechoslovakia) Jiří Javorský (India) Naresh Kumar	8	6	6
LL	(Norway) Jarl Bibow (Switzerland) Dimitri Sturdza	6	3	4
(France) Jean-Claude Barclay (France) François Jauffret	1	2	0
Q	(Australia) John Stephens (Australia) Brian Tobin	6	6	6
(Australia) Martin Mulligan (Italy) Nicola Pietrangeli	8	6	6
(Sweden) Kenneth Andersson (Sweden) Ove Bengtson	6	2	4
(United States) Arthur Ashe (United States) Bill Bond	7	6	6
(United States) Tom Brown (United States) Hugh Stewart	5	1	4
(Australia) John Newcombe (Australia) Tony Roche	3	6	6	7
(France) Patrice Beust (France) Daniel Contet	6	3	4	5

Second round
4	(Australia) R Emerson (Australia) K Fletcher	8	6	6
(South Africa) C Brebnor (Australia) J Hillebrand	6	1	1
(United States) A Fox (United States) L Nagler	6	4	6	3
(Czechoslovakia) J Javorský (India) N Kumar	8	6	4	6
Q	(Australia) J Stephens (Australia) B Tobin	6	7	3	4	7
(Australia) M Mulligan (Italy) N Pietrangeli	4	5	6	6	9
(United States) A Ashe (United States) W Bond	2	6	22	3	4
(Australia) J Newcombe (Australia) A Roche	6	2	20	6	6

Third round
4	(Australia) R Emerson (Australia) K Fletcher	6	6	6
(Czechoslovakia) J Javorský (India) N Kumar	3	3	2
(Australia) M Mulligan (Italy) N Pietrangeli	6	4	5	3
(Australia) J Newcombe (Australia) A Roche	4	6	7	6

Quarterfinals
4	(Australia) R Emerson (Australia) K Fletcher	6	6	8
(Australia) J Newcombe (Australia) A Roche	4	3	6

=== Bottom half ===
==== Section 3 ====
First round
(United Kingdom) John Crump (United Kingdom) Geoffrey Paish	3	4	2
(Argentina) Roberto Aubone (Argentina) Eduardo Soriano	6	6	6
(Philippines) Guillermo Hernandez (Finland) Reino Nyyssönen	8	8	4	5	6
Q	(Chile) Patricio Cornejo (Chile) Patricio Rodríguez	6	6	6	7	4
(United Kingdom) Reg Bennett (United Kingdom) Michael Hann	6	4	1
(United States) Clark Graebner (United States) Marty Riessen	8	6	6
(Australia) Bob Howe (Denmark) Torben Ulrich	4	6	6	3
(South Africa) Keith Diepraam (South Africa) Cliff Drysdale	6	4	8	6
(Brazil) Ronnie Barnes (Brazil) Thomaz Koch	6	1	6	5	6
(Denmark) Jan Leschly (Denmark) Jørgen Ulrich	4	6	3	7	4
(Czechoslovakia) Milan Holeček (Czechoslovakia) Štěpán Koudelka	3	7	6	0
(United Kingdom) Alan Mills (United Kingdom) Roger Taylor	6	9	3	6
(United States) Ron Fisher (United States) Cliff Richey	4	6	6	4
(United States) Donald Dell (United States) Mike Franks	6	8	3	6
(United States) Bill Hoogs (United States) Jim McManus	4	2	1
3	(Australia) Bob Hewitt (Australia) Fred Stolle	6	6	6

Second round
(Argentina) R Aubone (Argentina) E Soriano	6	1	6	3
(Philippines) G Hernandez (Finland) R Nyyssönen	8	6	1	6
(United States) C Graebner (United States) M Riessen	9	7	6	3	10
(South Africa) K Diepraam (South Africa) C Drysdale	11	5	2	6	8
(Brazil) R Barnes (Brazil) T Koch	9	6	6
(United Kingdom) A Mills (United Kingdom) R Taylor	7	4	2
(United States) D Dell (United States) M Franks	4	1	7
3	(Australia) R Hewitt (Australia) F Stolle	6	6	9

Third round
(Philippines) G Hernandez (Finland) R Nyyssönen	5	4	2
(United States) C Graebner (United States) M Riessen	7	6	6
(Brazil) R Barnes (Brazil) T Koch	6	2	6	3	4
3	(Australia) R Hewitt (Australia) F Stolle	3	6	0	6	6

Quarterfinals
(United States) C Graebner (United States) M Riessen	2	4	6	2
3	(Australia) R Hewitt (Australia) F Stolle	6	6	3	6

==== Section 4 ====
First round
(France) Pierre Barthès (France) Pierre Darmon	3	2	4
(Japan) Osamu Ishiguro (United States) Gene Scott	6	6	6
(West Germany) Wilhelm Bungert (West Germany) Christian Kuhnke	6	10	7	9	6
(Rhodesia) Adrian Bey (Australia) Bill Bowrey	3	12	5	11	4
(India) Premjit Lall (India) Jaidip Mukerjea	10	6	16	6
(South Africa) David Phillips (South Africa) Terry Ryan	12	4	14	4
(United Kingdom) Mark Cox (United Kingdom) Harry Matheson	10	4	9	6
(Venezuela) Isaías Pimentel (West Germany) Wolfgang Stuck	8	6	7	4
(United Kingdom) Stanley Matthews (United Kingdom) Graham Stilwell	7	3	4
(Soviet Union) Toomas Leius (Soviet Union) Sergei Likhachev	9	6	6
(Spain) José Luis Arilla (Spain) Manuel Santana	w/o
(Canada) Keith Carpenter (Canada) François Godbout
(United States) Cliff Buchholz (United States) Butch Newman	4	6	2	6	1
(New Zealand) John McDonald (New Zealand) Jeff Robson	6	3	6	4	6
(United Kingdom) Clay Iles (United Kingdom) Keith Wooldridge	10	0	8
2	(Mexico) Rafael Osuna (Mexico) Antonio Palafox	12	6	10

Second round
(Japan) O Ishiguro (United States) E Scott	6	6	5	8	4
(West Germany) W Bungert (West Germany) C Kuhnke	8	3	7	6	6
(India) P Lall (India) J Mukerjea	6	12	6
(United Kingdom) M Cox (United Kingdom) H Matheson	2	10	4
(Soviet Union) T Leius (Soviet Union) S Likhachev	6	6	6
(Canada) K Carpenter (Canada) F Godbout	3	3	4
(New Zealand) J McDonald (New Zealand) J Robson	4	1	5
2	(Mexico) R Osuna (Mexico) A Palafox	6	6	7

Third round
(West Germany) W Bungert (West Germany) C Kuhnke	6	9	13
(India) P Lall (India) J Mukerjea	4	7	11
(Soviet Union) T Leius (Soviet Union) S Likhachev	4	8	6
2	(Mexico) R Osuna (Mexico) A Palafox	6	10	8

Quarterfinals
(West Germany) W Bungert (West Germany) C Kuhnke	3	3	6	5
2	(Mexico) R Osuna (Mexico) A Palafox	6	6	3	7
