= Jacqueline Rees-Lewis =

French tennis player

- Country (sports): France
- Born: 23 November 1935 (age 89)
- Plays: Right-handed

Singles

Grand Slam singles results
- French Open: 4R (1963)
- Wimbledon: 4R (1964)
- US Open: 4R (1964)

Doubles

Grand Slam doubles results
- French Open: 2R (1960, 1961)
- Wimbledon: 2R (1965)

Grand Slam mixed doubles results
- French Open: 3R (1960)
- Wimbledon: 2R (1964, 1965)
- US Open: 2R (1964)

Jacqueline Rees-Lewis (born 23 November 1935) is a French former tennis player.

Active since 1955 till 1972, Rees-Lewis made the singles round of 16 at Roland Garros, Wimbledon and U.S. National Championships during her career. She won titles at Cannes and the Riviera Championships. In 1964 she represented France at the Federation Cup and featured in three ties, including the quarter-final against West Germany.

== See also ==
- List of France Fed Cup team representatives
