= Carole Rosser =

British tennis player

- Country (sports): United Kingdom
- Born: 20 April 1942 (age 82)

Singles

Grand Slam singles results
- French Open: 2R (1963)
- Wimbledon: 3R (1964, 1965)
- US Open: 1R (1964)

Doubles

Grand Slam doubles results
- French Open: 2R (1963, 1964)
- Wimbledon: 3R (1965)
- US Open: QF (1964)

Grand Slam mixed doubles results
- French Open: 3R (1963)
- Wimbledon: 2R (1961, 1962, 1963, 1965)

Carole Rosser (born 20 April 1942) is a British former tennis player.

A native of Devon, Rosser was active in the 1960s. Her tournaments wins include singles titles at the South of England Championships in 1962 and Welsh Championships in 1963. She was a three-time winner of the Scottish Hard Court Championships. In 1964 she had an upset win over Lesley Turner at a tournament in Lausanne. She and Virginia Wade teamed up to make the doubles quarter-finals of the 1964 U.S. National Championships.

Rosser married Scottish tennis player Harry Matheson and their son is former professional player Ross Matheson.
