= 1964 Wimbledon Championships – Men's singles =

Men's singles
- 1964 Wimbledon Championships

Final
- Champion: (Australia) Roy Emerson
- Runner-up: (Australia) Fred Stolle
- Score: 6–4, 12–10, 4–6, 6–3

Details
- Draw: 128 (10 Q )
- Seeds: 8

Events
Singles	men	women		boys	girls
Doubles	men	women	mixed	boys	girls
← 1963 ·	Wimbledon Championships	· 1965 →

Roy Emerson defeated Fred Stolle 6–4, 12–10, 4–6, 6–3 in the final to win the gentlemen's singles tennis title at the 1964 Wimbledon Championships. Chuck McKinley was the defending champion, but lost in the semifinals to Stolle.

== Seeds ==
1. (Australia) Roy Emerson (champion)
2. (United States) Chuck McKinley (semifinals)
3. (Spain) Manuel Santana (fourth round)
4. (Mexico) Rafael Osuna (quarterfinals)
5. (United States) Dennis Ralston (first round)
6. (Australia) Fred Stolle (final)
7. (Italy) Nicola Pietrangeli (second round)
8. (Australia) Martin Mulligan (second round)

Click on the seed number of a player to go to their draw section.

== Draw ==
=== Key ===
- Q = Qualifier
- WC = Wild card
- LL = Lucky loser
- Alt = Alternate
- ITF = ITF entry
- PR = Protected ranking
- SR = Special ranking
- SE = Special exempt
- JE = Junior exempt
- JR = Junior Accelerator Programme entrant
- CO = College Accelerator Programme entrant
- NG = Next Gen Accelerator Program entrant
- w/o = Walkover
- r = Retired
- d = Defaulted

=== Finals ===
Quarterfinals
1	(Australia) Roy Emerson	6	6	6
(Australia) Bob Hewitt	1	4	4
4	(Mexico) Rafael Osuna	4	2	3
(West Germany) Wilhelm Bungert	6	6	6
6	(Australia) Fred Stolle	6	7	6
(West Germany) Christian Kuhnke	3	5	3
(South Africa) Abe Segal	3	3	6	4
2	(United States) Chuck McKinley	6	6	4	6

Semifinals
1	(Australia) Roy Emerson	6	15	6
(West Germany) Wilhelm Bungert	3	13	0
6	(Australia) Fred Stolle	4	10	9	6
2	(United States) Chuck McKinley	6	8	7	4

Final
1	(Australia) Roy Emerson	6	12	4	6
6	(Australia) Fred Stolle	4	10	6	3

=== Top half ===
==== Section 1 ====
First round
1	(Australia) Roy Emerson	6	6	6
(United States) Donald Dell	3	1	0
(Socialist Federal Republic of Yugoslavia) Nikola Pilić	6	3	6	6
(Japan) Osamu Ishiguro	3	6	3	2
(Switzerland) Dimitri Sturdza	6	6	6	10
Q	(Jamaica) Richard Russell	1	4	8	8
(United States) Hugh Stewart	6	6	6	6
LL	(United States) Ray Senkowski	4	2	8	2
Q	(Czechoslovakia) Milan Holeček	6	4	8	1
(United States) Arthur Ashe	3	6	10	6
(United States) Cliff Richey	6	3	6	8	6
(Poland) Andrzej Licis	4	6	4	10	3
(France) Daniel Contet	4	1	0
(New Zealand) Lew Gerrard	6	6	6
Q	(United Kingdom) Roy Dixon	4	4	7	2
(United States) Bill Bond	6	6	5	6

Second round
1	(Australia) R Emerson	6	11	3	6
(Socialist Federal Republic of Yugoslavia) N Pilić	3	9	6	4
(Switzerland) D Sturdza	4	4	5
(United States) H Stewart	6	6	7
(United States) A Ashe	4	4	6	6	6
(United States) C Richey	6	6	3	2	2
(New Zealand) L Gerrard	5	3	2
(United States) W Bond	7	6	6

Third round
1	(Australia) R Emerson	6	6	6
(United States) H Stewart	3	3	3
(United States) A Ashe	6	6	6
(United States) W Bond	4	4	0

Fourth round
1	(Australia) R Emerson	6	6	7
(United States) A Ashe	3	2	5

==== Section 2 ====
First round
8	(Australia) Martin Mulligan	8	6	6
(West Germany) Wolfgang Stuck	6	4	2
(Italy) Giordano Maioli	0	2	0
(Australia) Bob Hewitt	6	6	6
(South Africa) Cliff Drysdale	6	6	3	2	6
(United States) Cliff Buchholz	2	4	6	6	4
(Canada) Mike Belkin	6	4	8	6
(Belgium) Claude De Gronckel	3	6	6	3
Q	(India) Shiv Prakash Misra	6	6	6
Q	(United States) Ned Neely	2	4	4
(India) Jaidip Mukerjea	4	6	6	3	6
(United Kingdom) Roger Taylor	6	2	3	6	4
(France) Michel Leclercq	1	3	1
(France) Pierre Darmon	6	6	6
(Brazil) Ronnie Barnes	6	7	6
(Soviet Union) Sergei Likhachev	4	5	1

Second round
8	(Australia) M Mulligan	4	2	4
(Australia) R Hewitt	6	6	6
(South Africa) C Drysdale	5	6	4	4
(Canada) M Belkin	7	3	6	6
Q	(India) SP Misra	6	1	1	6	4
(India) J Mukerjea	2	6	6	2	6
(France) P Darmon	4	6	7	4	6
(Brazil) R Barnes	6	3	5	6	1

Third round
(Australia) R Hewitt	6	6	6
(Canada) M Belkin	4	0	1
(India) J Mukerjea	6	4	6	6	7
(France) P Darmon	0	6	8	3	5

Fourth round
(Australia) R Hewitt	6	6	6
(India) J Mukerjea	4	2	1

==== Section 3 ====
First round
4	(Mexico) Rafael Osuna	6	6	6
(United States) Larry Nagler	4	4	4
(Ecuador) Eduardo Zuleta	6	6	6
Q	(Netherlands) Jan Hajer	4	4	2
(United States) Ron Fisher	3	6	12	2
(United States) Marty Riessen	6	3	14	6
(Tunisia) Mustapha Belkhodja	4	4	2
(United States) Ronnie Holmberg	6	6	6
(Spain) José Luis Arilla	3	6	6	4	6
Q	(United States) Roger Werksman	6	3	4	6	4
(Australia) Ronald McKenzie	6	5	3
(Brazil) José Edison Mandarino	8	7	6
(Hungary) István Gulyás	2	6	8	4	6
(New Zealand) John McDonald	6	4	6	6	2
(United States) Bill Hoogs	4	6	5	4
(Venezuela) Isaías Pimentel	6	2	7	6

Second round
4	(Mexico) R Osuna	6	6	6
(Ecuador) E Zuleta	2	1	3
(United States) M Riessen	16	13	4	2	8
(United States) R Holmberg	14	11	6	6	10
(Spain) JL Arilla	9	3	11	6
(Brazil) JE Mandarino	7	6	9	3
(Hungary) I Gulyás	5	8	6	6	3
(Venezuela) I Pimentel	7	6	2	8	6

Third round
4	(Mexico) R Osuna	6	6	3	6
(United States) R Holmberg	4	4	6	3
(Spain) JL Arilla	6	6	5	6
(Venezuela) I Pimentel	4	4	7	4

Fourth round
4	(Mexico) R Osuna	6	6	10	6
(Spain) JL Arilla	4	4	12	3

==== Section 4 ====
First round
5	(United States) Dennis Ralston	6	6	4	5	7
(United Kingdom) Tony Pickard	3	3	6	7	9
(United Kingdom) Graham Stilwell	10	2	2	7	6
(United States) Tom Brown	8	6	6	5	8
(Denmark) Jørgen Ulrich	7	9	6	9	8
(United States) Charlie Pasarell	9	11	4	7	6
Q	(United Kingdom) Gerald Battrick	3	2	6
(Canada) François Godbout	6	6	8
Q	(United Kingdom) Charlie Applewhaite	4	3	6
(South Africa) Keith Diepraam	6	6	8
(West Germany) Wilhelm Bungert	8	7	1	3	6
(South Africa) Ray Moore	6	5	6	6	2
(Italy) Michele Pirro	w/o
(France) François Jauffret
(United Kingdom) Mike Sangster	6	6	6
(Finland) Reino Nyyssönen	4	4	4

Second round
(United Kingdom) A Pickard	6	6	4	6
(United States) T Brown	4	2	6	4
(Denmark) J Ulrich	2	6	8	6
(Canada) F Godbout	6	4	6	3
(South Africa) K Diepraam	7	3	6	6	2
(West Germany) W Bungert	5	6	3	8	6
(France) F Jauffret	5	7	4
(United Kingdom) M Sangster	7	9	6

Third round
(United Kingdom) A Pickard	6	4	4	1
(Denmark) J Ulrich	3	6	6	6
(West Germany) W Bungert	6	4	6	6
(United Kingdom) M Sangster	4	6	3	3

Fourth round
(Denmark) J Ulrich	6	2	3	4
(West Germany) W Bungert	3	6	6	6

=== Bottom half ===
==== Section 5 ====
First round
(United States) Frank Froehling	11	6	2	6	4
(Greece) Nicholas Kalogeropoulos	13	3	6	0	6
(Australia) Bob Carmichael	6	6	7	2	9
LL	(South Africa) Jack Saul	2	1	9	6	7
(United Kingdom) Keith Wooldridge	6	6	6
(Socialist Federal Republic of Yugoslavia) Boro Jovanović	4	1	3
(Belgium) Eric Drossart	6	6	10	6
(New Zealand) Jeff Robson	1	8	8	1
LL	(United Kingdom) Michael Waters	2	2	1
(Australia) John Stephens	6	6	6
(Mexico) Antonio Palafox	6	3	6	6
(United Kingdom) John Crump	2	6	3	4
(Australia) Ken Fletcher	7	6	6
(Czechoslovakia) Jiří Javorský	5	2	4
(Australia) John Newcombe	6	5	3
6	(Australia) Fred Stolle	8	7	6

Second round
(Greece) N Kalogeropoulos	6	4	6	13	6
(Australia) R Carmichael	8	6	3	11	4
(United Kingdom) K Wooldridge	6	6	10
(Belgium) E Drossart	3	4	8
(Australia) J Stephens	5	6	3	2
(Mexico) A Palafox	7	3	6	6
(Australia) K Fletcher	11	6	3	4
6	(Australia) F Stolle	13	4	6	6

Third round
(Greece) N Kalogeropoulos	3	7	6	2	6
(United Kingdom) K Wooldridge	6	5	1	6	4
(Mexico) A Palafox	0	2	6	6	9
6	(Australia) F Stolle	6	6	3	4	11

Fourth round
(Greece) N Kalogeropoulos	2	3	0
6	(Australia) F Stolle	6	6	6

==== Section 6 ====
First round
(United Kingdom) Bobby Wilson	3	4	6	2
(West Germany) Christian Kuhnke	6	6	1	6
LL	(United Kingdom) Geoffrey Bluett	2	4	2
(Canada) Keith Carpenter	6	6	6
(Rhodesia) Adrian Bey	3	2	11	6	6
(Australia) John Hillebrand	6	6	9	3	3
(Denmark) Jan Leschly	5	9	4
(South Africa) Clive Brebnor	7	11	6
(France) Jean-Claude Barclay	5	4	1
(Brazil) Carlos Fernandes	7	6	6
(Chile) Patricio Rodríguez	5	14	4
(United States) Gene Scott	7	16	6
(United States) Allen Fox	3	2	2
(Soviet Union) Toomas Leius	6	6	6
(India) Premjit Lall	2	6	3	5
3	(Spain) Manuel Santana	6	2	6	7

Second round
(West Germany) C Kuhnke	6	6	6
(Canada) K Carpenter	3	2	1
(Rhodesia) A Bey	4	5	6	6	6
(South Africa) C Brebnor	6	7	3	4	1
(Brazil) C Fernandes	2	4	6	1
(United States) E Scott	6	6	3	6
(Soviet Union) T Leius	4	2	2
3	(Spain) M Santana	6	6	6

Third round
(West Germany) C Kuhnke	6	6	6
(Rhodesia) A Bey	1	4	4
(United States) E Scott	3	6	6	3	7
3	(Spain) M Santana	6	4	3	6	9

Fourth round
(West Germany) C Kuhnke	6	7	6	6
3	(Spain) M Santana	3	5	8	4

==== Section 7 ====
First round
(Australia) Bob Howe	6	6	9
(France) Alain Bresson	1	4	7
(South Africa) Abe Segal	6	7	6
(United States) Clark Graebner	2	5	2
(South Africa) Frew McMillan	3	7	3	2^{r}
(Netherlands) Tom Okker	6	5	6	3
(Soviet Union) Alex Metreveli	6	3	6	6
(Argentina) Eduardo Soriano	3	6	1	4
(United States) Jim McManus	8	8	6
(New Zealand) Ian Crookenden	6	6	3
(United States) Mike Franks	6	6	3	6	6
(United States) Butch Newman	8	1	6	4	4
(Philippines) Guillermo Hernandez	7	4	3
(France) Pierre Barthès	9	6	6
(Australia) Bill Bowrey	3	6	7	5
7	(Italy) Nicola Pietrangeli	6	4	9	7

Second round
(Australia) R Howe	2	6	3	7	6
(South Africa) A Segal	6	1	6	5	8
(Netherlands) T Okker	6	5	4	2
(Soviet Union) A Metreveli	2	7	6	6
(United States) J McManus	3	6	4	12	4
(United States) M Franks	6	2	6	10	6
(France) P Barthès	6	7	6
7	(Italy) N Pietrangeli	3	5	4

Third round
(South Africa) A Segal
(Soviet Union) A Metreveli	w/o
(United States) M Franks	10	9	17	3	4
(France) P Barthès	12	7	15	6	6

Fourth round
(South Africa) A Segal	6	4	6	6
(France) P Barthès	2	6	3	4

==== Section 8 ====
First round
(United Kingdom) Clay Iles	2	6	6	1	4
(South Africa) Colin Zeeman	6	3	2	6	6
(South Africa) David Phillips	3	7	6	6	6
LL	(Sweden) Kenneth Andersson	6	9	3	4	2
(United Kingdom) Alan Mills	1	2	4
(United Kingdom) Billy Knight	6	6	6
(United Kingdom) Mark Cox	4	6	8	6
(Colombia) William Álvarez	6	1	6	3
(Spain) José María Gisbert	1	4	4
(Australia) Tony Roche	6	6	6
(United Kingdom) Stanley Matthews	9	3	2
(Denmark) Torben Ulrich	11	6	6
LL	(Sweden) Ove Bengtson	1	5	3
(Brazil) Thomaz Koch	6	7	6
Q	(South Africa) Terry Ryan	2	1	3
2	(United States) Chuck McKinley	6	6	6

Second round
(South Africa) C Zeeman	3	4	2
(South Africa) D Phillips	6	6	6
(United Kingdom) W Knight	6	6	11
(United Kingdom) M Cox	4	3	9
(Australia) A Roche	7	2	7	5
(Denmark) T Ulrich	9	6	5	7
(Brazil) T Koch	6	3	4	7	4
2	(United States) C McKinley	3	6	6	5	6

Third round
(South Africa) D Phillips	2	0	2
(United Kingdom) W Knight	6	6	6
(Denmark) T Ulrich	5	3	6	5
2	(United States) C McKinley	7	6	2	7

Fourth round
(United Kingdom) W Knight	6	4	6	4
2	(United States) C McKinley	8	6	2	6

Preceded by 1964 French Championships	Grand Slams; Men's Singles	Succeeded by 1964 U.S. Championships
