= Jane Albert =

American tennis player

- Full name: Jane Albert Willens
- Country (sports): United States
- Born: June 2, 1946 (age 79) Los Angeles, U.S.
- Died: 30 November 2023 (aged 77) Los Angeles
- Plays: Right-handed

Singles

Grand Slam singles results
- French Open: 2R (1965)
- Wimbledon: QF (1965)
- US Open: 3R (1965)

Doubles

Grand Slam doubles results
- Wimbledon: QF (1966)

Jane Albert Willens (June 2, 1946 – 30 November 2023) was an American tennis player. She was the daughter of San Francisco 49ers quarterback Frankie Albert.

A right-handed player, Albert was a member of the tennis team at Stanford and was the 1964 AIAW singles champion.

While at college she competed on the international tennis tour, including Wimbledon, where she made the quarter-finals in 1965. En route she beat Norma Baylon, Helga Schultze and Françoise Dürr.

Albert represented the United States in the 1966 Wightman Cup, partnering Billie Jean King in doubles.

In 1967, her senior year, she won the AIAW doubles championship with Julie Anthony and competed at the Pan American Games in Winnipeg, winning two gold medals for doubles and a bronze medal in the singles.

Albert's daughter, Heather Willens, played tennis at Stanford and briefly on professional tennis tour in the early 1990s.
