= 1964 U.S. National Championships (tennis) =

- Date: 2 September – 13 September
- Edition: 84th
- Category: Grand Slam (ITF)
- Surface: Grass
- Location: Forest Hills, Queens; New York City, New York
- Venue: West Side Tennis Club

Champions

Men's singles
- (Australia) Roy Emerson

Women's singles
- (Brazil) Maria Bueno

Men's doubles
- (United States) Chuck McKinley / (United States) Dennis Ralston

Women's doubles
- (United States) Billie Jean Moffitt / (United States) Karen Hantze Susman

Mixed doubles
- (Australia) Margaret Smith / (Australia) John Newcombe
- U.S. National Championships

The 1964 U.S. National Championships (now known as the US Open) was a tennis tournament that took place on the outdoor grass courts at the West Side Tennis Club, Forest Hills in New York City, New York. The tournament ran from 2 September until 13 September. It was the 84th staging of the U.S. National Championships, and the fourth Grand Slam tennis event of 1964.

== Finals ==
=== Men's singles ===
(Australia) Roy Emerson defeated (Australia) Fred Stolle 6–4, 6–1, 6–4

=== Women's singles ===
(Brazil) Maria Bueno defeated (United States) Carole Caldwell Graebner 6–1, 6–0

=== Men's doubles ===
(United States) Chuck McKinley / (United States) Dennis Ralston defeated (United Kingdom) Graham Stilwell / (United Kingdom) Mike Sangster 6–3, 6–2, 6–4

=== Women's doubles ===
(United States) Billie Jean Moffitt / (United States) Karen Susman defeated (Australia) Margaret Smith / (Australia) Lesley Turner 3–6, 6–2, 6–4

=== Mixed doubles ===
(Australia) Margaret Smith / (Australia) John Newcombe defeated (Australia) Judy Tegart / (United States) Ed Rubinoff 10–8, 4–6, 6–3

Preceded by 1964 Wimbledon Championships	Grand Slams	Succeeded by 1965 Australian Championships
