= Carol-Ann Kalogeropoulos =

Greek-American tennis player

- Full name: Carol-Ann Prosen Kalogeropoulos
- Country (sports): United States; Greece
- Born: March 11, 1943 (age 82)

Singles

Grand Slam singles results
- French Open: 3R (1964, 1968)
- Wimbledon: 2R (1964)

Doubles

Grand Slam doubles results
- French Open: 2R (1967, 1969)
- Wimbledon: 3R (1964)

Grand Slam mixed doubles results
- French Open: 3R (1968)
- Wimbledon: 3R (1963, 1967, 1972)

Carol-Ann Kalogeropoulos (née Prosen; born March 11, 1943) is an American-Greek retired professional tennis player.

She originally competed under her maiden name Carol-Ann Prosen and is a native of Florida. An Orange Bowl (18s) champion in 1960, she toured under the American flag until her marriage to Greek tennis player Nicholas Kalogeropoulos in 1966. She was a member of the Greece Federation Cup team between 1968 and 1973.
