= Peachy Kellmeyer =

American tennis player and tennis administrator

- Full name: Fern Lee Kellmeyer
- Country (sports): United States
- Born: February 19, 1944 (age 82) Wheeling, West Virginia
- Int. Tennis HoF: 2011 (member page)

Singles

Grand Slam singles results
- Wimbledon: R2 (1964)

Fern 'Peachy' Kellmeyer (born February 19, 1944, in West Virginia, United States) is a retired tennis player and current tennis administrator who helped change the face of women's tennis. Kellmeyer is an alumnus of Florida Atlantic University.

A junior champion in the 1950s, Kellmeyer played No. 1 on the University of Miami women's tennis team. She was also the first woman to compete on the University of Miami's Division I men's tennis team.

In 1973, Kellmeyer was tapped by founder Gladys Heldman as the first tour director of the fledgling Virginia Slims Circuit. She continuously pushed to secure additional venues and increased prize money for players. In 1977, she brought the first women's tennis tournament to Madison Square Garden.

She is the tour operations executive consultant for the Women's Tennis Association.
