= Glenda Swan =

South African tennis player (born 1945)

- Country (sports): South Africa
- Born: 12 November 1945 (age 80) Johannesburg, South Africa

Grand Slam singles results
- French Open: 4R (1966)
- Wimbledon: 4R (1964)
- US Open: 2R (1964)

Grand Slam doubles results
- French Open: QF (1966)
- Wimbledon: QF (1965, 1966)

Grand Slam mixed doubles results
- French Open: 1R (1965, 1967)
- Wimbledon: QF (1966)

Glenda Swan (born 12 November 1945), Glenda Schaerer after marriage, is a South African former tennis player.

Born in Johannesburg, Swan was active on tour during the 1960s. She featured in ten Federation Cup rubbers for South Africa, registering two singles and three doubles wins. In both of her Federation Cup seasons, 1964 and 1967, she played in a quarter-final tie, for losses to Great Britain and the United States respectively.

Swans' best tour performances included a run of three wins at the 1964 Wimbledon Championships, where she took a set off fourth-seed Lesley Turner in a Round of 16 loss. She twice partnered with Pat Walkden to make the women's doubles quarter-finals at Wimbledon and was also a quarter-finalist once in mixed doubles.

== See also ==
- List of South Africa Fed Cup team representatives
