= Mary McAnally =

British TV producer (1945–2016)

- Full name: Mary Basil Hamilton McAnally
- Country (sports): Great Britain
- Born: 9 April 1945 Epsom, Surrey
- Died: 3 March 2016 (aged 70)

Singles

Grand Slam singles results
- French Open: 2R (1966)
- Wimbledon: 1R (1963, 1964, 1965, 1966)

Doubles

Grand Slam doubles results
- French Open: 3R (1966)
- Wimbledon: 2R (1963)
- US Open: 2R (1969)

Grand Slam mixed doubles results
- Wimbledon: 3R (1965)
- US Open: 1R (1969)

Mary Basil Hamilton McAnally (9 April 1945 – 3 March 2016) was a British television producer and tennis player.

McAnally was born in Epsom, Surrey and attended Tiffin Girls' School. She was the twin sister of Royal Navy officer John McAnally. Their father Patrick, a scholar, was involved in establishing the John Lewis Partnership and their mother, Basil, was notably the London Fire Brigade's first female officer during World War II.

Active in tennis in the 1960s, McAnally was a British junior covered court champion, winning the final against Virginia Wade. She featured in four editions of the Wimbledon Championships and played at county level for Surrey.

In 1979 she married journalist Hugh Macpherson.

McAnally, a graduate of London Business School, has production credits which include Money-Go-Round, The John Smith Show, 4 What It’s Worth and The Time, the Place. In 1996 she was appointed managing director of Meridian Broadcasting, before leaving the television industry in the early 2000s.
