= 1965 Australian Championships =

- Date: 22 January – 1 February 1965
- Edition: 53rd
- Category: Grand Slam (ITF)
- Surface: Grass
- Location: Melbourne, Australia
- Venue: Kooyong Lawn Tennis Club

Champions

Men's singles
- (Australia) Roy Emerson

Women's singles
- (Australia) Margaret Smith

Men's doubles
- (Australia) John Newcombe / (Australia) Tony Roche

Women's doubles
- (Australia) Margaret Smith / (Australia) Lesley Turner

Mixed doubles
- (Australia) Robyn Ebbern / (Australia) Owen Davidson (Australia) Margaret Smith / (Australia) John Newcombe
← 1964 ·	Australian Championships	· 1966 →

The 1965 Australian Championships was a tennis tournament that took place on outdoor Grass courts at the Kooyong Lawn Tennis Club, Melbourne, Australia from 22 January to 1 February. It was the 53rd edition of the Australian Championships (now known as the Australian Open), the 15th held in Melbourne, and the first Grand Slam tournament of the year. The singles titles were won by Australians Roy Emerson and Margaret Smith.

== Champions ==
=== Men's singles ===
(Australia) Roy Emerson defeated (Australia) Fred Stolle 7–9, 2–6, 6–4, 7–5, 6–1

=== Women's singles ===
(Australia) Margaret Smith defeated (Brazil) Maria Bueno 5–7, 6–4, 5–2 retired

=== Men's doubles ===
(Australia) John Newcombe / (Australia) Tony Roche defeated (Australia) Roy Emerson / (Australia) Fred Stolle 3–6, 4–6, 13–11, 6–3, 6–4

=== Women's doubles ===
(Australia) Margaret Smith / (Australia) Lesley Turner defeated (Australia) Robyn Ebbern / (United States) Billie Jean Moffitt, 1–6, 6–2, 6–3

=== Mixed doubles ===
(Australia) Robyn Ebbern / (Australia) Owen Davidson and (Australia) Margaret Smith / (Australia) John Newcombe (final not played) (Note: The mixed doubles final was not played because of bad weather)

== Notes ==
Preceded by 1964 U.S. National Championships	Grand Slams	Succeeded by 1965 French Championships
