= Judy Alvarez =

American tennis player

- Country (sports): United States
- Born: April 2, 1943 (age 83)
- Plays: Right-handed

Grand Slam singles results
- French Open: 4R (1963)
- Wimbledon: 4R (1964)
- US Open: 4R (1963)

Judy Alvarez (born April 2, 1943) is an American former professional tennis player.

Alvarez grew up in the Tampa neighborhood of Ybor City, and she is of Cuban and Italian descent. Her Cuban-American father was a bus driver, and her Sicilian-born mother worked in a cigar factory.

A Florida state junior champion, Alvarez won the Orange Bowl in 1961, and the following year, she graduated from Jefferson High School. She attended the University of Tampa on a football scholarship, with the college yet to have established a women's tennis team.

Alvarez's best performance at Wimbledon was when she made the round of 16 in 1964, which included a win over Virginia Wade. She also reached the round of 16 at the French and U.S. Championships during her career.

By the age of 21 she was ranked sixth nationally, but then suddenly she quit the tour after being overlooked for the Wightman Cup team despite recently having beaten Darlene Hard and Billie Jean Moffitt.

In the 1970s, she made a brief comeback to the professional tour.
