= Ulla Sandulf =

Swedish former tennis player (born 1943)

- Country (sports): Sweden
- Born: 30 January 1943
- Plays: Left-handed

Singles

Grand Slam singles results
- French Open: 2R (1964, 1967)
- Wimbledon: 3R (1964)

Ulla Sandulf (born 30 January 1943) is a Swedish former tennis player.

A Left-handed player, Sandulf was the Swedish outdoor champion in 1963 and featured in her country's debut Federation Cup tie against Canada the following year.

Sandulf made it through to the third round of the 1964 Wimbledon Championships.

== See also ==
- List of Sweden Fed Cup team representatives
