= Robin Blakelock =

British tennis player (born 1944)

- Full name: Robina Blakelock
- Country (sports): Great Britain
- Born: 21 February 1944 (age 82)

Singles

Grand Slam singles results
- French Open: 3R (1963, 1965)
- Wimbledon: 3R (1965)

Doubles

Grand Slam doubles results
- French Open: 3R (1965)
- Wimbledon: SF (1968)

Grand Slam mixed doubles results
- French Open: 1R (1963)
- Wimbledon: 3R (1961, 1964, 1965, 1967, 1969)

Robina Blakelock (born 21 February 1944) is a British former tennis player. Starting in 1963, she competed under her married name, Robin Lloyd, and was remarried in 1970 to Australian player Graham Primrose.

Active in the 1960s, Blakelock grew up in Sussex. She was a British junior champion and as a 19-year old came close to beating Angela Mortimer, holding a match point against her in the 1962 Brighton final; and beat former champion Darlene Hard at the 1963 French Championships in a long second round match, 13–11, 1–6, 8–6. Her best Wimbledon performances included a singles third round appearance in 1965 and All England Plate runner-up finish in 1966. She was a women's doubles semi-finalist at the 1968 Wimbledon Championships with Frances MacLennan.
