= 1964 U.S. National Championships – Women's singles =

Women's singles
- 1964 U.S. National Championships

Final
- Champion: (Brazil) Maria Bueno
- Runner-up: (United States) Carole Graebner
- Score: 6–1, 6–0

Details
- Seeds: 8

Events
Singles	men	women
Doubles	men	women
- U.S. National Championships

First-seeded Maria Bueno defeated Carole Graebner 6–1, 6–0 in the final to win the women's singles tennis title at the 1964 U.S. National Championships. Bueno won the tournament without losing a set. Graebner refused to default even though she had second degree burns from a severe sunburn.

It took Bueno only 25 minutes to win the final, though her own recollection was 19 minutes.

== Seeds ==
The seeded players are listed below. Maria Bueno is the champion; others show in brackets the round in which they were eliminated.

1. (Brazil) Maria Bueno (champion)
2. (Australia) Margaret Smith (fourth round)
3. (United States) Billie Jean Moffitt (quarterfinals)
4. (Australia) Lesley Turner (second round)
5. (United States) Nancy Richey (semifinals)
6. (United Kingdom) Ann Jones (quarterfinals)
7. (Australia) Robyn Ebbern (quarterfinals)
8. (Argentina) Norma Baylon (fourth round)

== Draw ==
=== Key ===
- Q = Qualifier
- WC = Wild card
- LL = Lucky loser
- r = Retired

=== Final eight ===
Quarterfinals
(United States) Karen Hantze Susman	6	6	3
(United States) Carole Graebner	4	8	6
3	(United States) Billie Jean Moffitt	4	4
5	(United States) Nancy Richey	6	6
6	(United Kingdom) Ann Jones	5	6	6
(United States) Carol Hanks	7	2	8
7	(Australia) Robyn Ebbern	4	1
1	(Brazil) Maria Bueno	6	6

Semifinals
(United States) Carole Graebner	2	9	6
5	(United States) Nancy Richey	6	7	4
(United States) Carol Hanks	4	2
1	(Brazil) Maria Bueno	6	6

Finals
(United States) Carole Graebner	1	0
1	(Brazil) Maria Bueno	6	6

Preceded by 1964 Wimbledon Championships – Women's singles	Grand Slam women's singles	Succeeded by 1965 Australian Championships – Women's singles
