= Francesca Gordigiani =

Italian tennis player (born 1940)

- Country (sports): Italy
- Born: 20 December 1940 (age 84)
- Plays: Right-handed

Singles

Grand Slam singles results
- Australian Open: 2R (1965)
- French Open: 3R (1968)
- Wimbledon: 3R (1961, 1963, 1964)

Doubles

Grand Slam doubles results
- Australian Open: 1R (1965)
- French Open: SF (1963)
- Wimbledon: 2R (1962, 1966, 1967, 1968)

Francesca Gordigiani (born 20 December 1940) is an Italian former tennis player.

Known by her nickname "Cecca", Gordigiani is a native of Florence and the great-granddaughter of famous Italian portrait painter Michele Gordigiani. Her grandfather, Edoardo Gordigiani, was also an impressionist of note.

Gordigiani, the girls' singles champion at Roland Garros in 1958, was one of Italy's top players during the 1960s. She won the Italian Tennis Championships in 1964 and reached the third round at Wimbledon on three occasions.

Between 1964 and 1968 she represented Italy in the Federation Cup, competing in three singles and four doubles rubbers. Most notably she was the first Italian to win a completed Federation Cup rubber, when she overcame West Germany's Heide Schildknecht in 1965 to earn Italy a place in the quarter-finals. The opening singles rubber had been awarded to teammate Lea Pericoli, through a second set retirement by Helga Niessen.

== See also ==
- List of Italy Fed Cup team representatives
