= Katarina Bartholdson =

Swedish tennis player

- Country (sports): Sweden
- Born: 25 February 1941 (age 84)

Singles

Grand Slam singles results
- Wimbledon: 3R (1963)

Katarina Bartholdson (born 25 February 1941) is a Swedish former tennis player. She also played under her maiden name Katarina Frendelius.

A winner of 11 national championships in singles or doubles, Bartholdson made her only Federation Cup appearance in Sweden's debut tie in 1964, against Canada. She won her singles match against Benita Senn, but was beaten in the live doubles rubber, partnering Ulla Sandulf.

Bartholdson competed in multiple Wimbledon draws and reached the singles third round in 1963, where she lost to top seed Margaret Smith (later Court).

== See also ==
- List of Sweden Fed Cup team representatives
