= Donna Floyd =

American tennis player

- Full name: Donna Floyd Fales
- Country (sports): United States
- Born: October 14, 1940 (age 84); Atlanta, Georgia

Singles

Grand Slam singles results
- French Open: QF (1962)
- Wimbledon: QF (1963)
- US Open: SF (1960)

Doubles

Grand Slam doubles results
- French Open: QF (1967)
- Wimbledon: QF (1964)
- US Open: F (1967)

Mixed doubles

Grand Slam mixed doubles results
- French Open: QF (1962)
- US Open: W (1966)

Donna Floyd Fales (née Floyd; born October 14, 1940) is an American amateur tennis player. She was ranked in the Top 10 in the United States from 1960 to 1963, and from 1965 to 1966.

== Biography ==
She was born in Atlanta, Georgia and moved to Arlington, Virginia at the age of 13. During her playing career she lived in New York City and since 1968 in Miami, Florida.

A graduate of the College of William and Mary, she won her first national junior title at age 15. She captured the singles title at the second national collegiate tournament for women in 1959.

She played on the U.S. Wightman Cup team in 1963, and later was captain of the Wightman and Federation Cup teams.

Fales won the U.S. Clay Court singles title in 1962, and was the U.S. mixed doubles champion in 1966. At the tournaments in Cincinnati and Canada, she won the singles title at Cincinnati in 1959 and at Canada in 1960. She also won the doubles title in Canada in 1960.

Fales has been inducted into Women's Collegiate Tennis Hall of Fame (1997), the Virginia All Sports Hall of Fame (1997), the Florida Tennis Association Hall of Fame (1987), the William & Mary Athletic Hall of Fame, and the Virginia Sports Hall of Fame & Museum (1997).

Fales has continued her tennis career throughout her adult life. She won ITF World Championships in Women's 80 singles, doubles (with Michelle Bichon), and mixed doubles (with Fred Drilling) in Mallorca during October 2023.

== Grand Slam finals ==
=== Doubles (1 runner-up) ===
Result	Year	Championship	Surface	Partner	Opponents	Score
Loss	1967	U.S. Championships	Grass	(United States) Mary-Ann Eisel	(United States) Rosemary Casals (United States) Billie Jean King	6–4, 3–6, 4–6

=== Mixed doubles (1 title) ===
Result	Year	Championship	Surface	Partner	Opponents	Score
Win	1966	U.S. Championships	Grass	(Australia) Owen Davidson	(United States) Carol Hanks (United States) Ed Rubinoff	6–1, 6–3
