= Sonja Pachta =

Austrian tennis player (1941–2024)

- Country (sports): Austria
- Born: 25 April 1941; Vienna, Nazi Germany
- Died: 21 August 2024 (aged 83); Vienna, Austria
- Plays: Right-handed

Singles

Grand Slam singles results
- French Open: 2R (1972)
- Wimbledon: 4R (1962)

Doubles

Grand Slam doubles results
- Wimbledon: 3R (1960, 1961, 1964)

Grand Slam mixed doubles results
- Wimbledon: 4R (1973)

Sonja Pachta (25 April 1941 – 21 August 2024) was an Austrian tennis player.

Pachta, a 19-time national singles champion, was active on tour from the 1950s through to the 1970s. From 1963 to 1975, she competed for the Austria Federation Cup team, featuring in 16 rubbers. Her best grand slam performance was a fourth round appearance at the 1962 Wimbledon Championships, where she lost to Billie Jean Moffitt (King). Pachta died in Vienna on 21 August 2024, at the age of 83.

== See also ==
- List of Austria Federation Cup team representatives
