= Carol Hanks Aucamp =

American tennis player (born 1943)

- Country (sports): United States
- Born: April 2, 1943 (age 82); St. Louis, Missouri, United States
- Height: 5 ft 7.5 in (1.71 m)
- Plays: Right-handed

Singles
- Highest ranking: U.S. No. 5 (1964)

Grand Slam singles results
- Wimbledon: 3R (1963)
- US Open: SF (1964)

Doubles

Grand Slam doubles results
- Wimbledon: QF (1964)
- US Open: F (1966)

Grand Slam mixed doubles results
- Wimbledon: QF (1963)

Carol Hanks Aucamp (born April 2, 1943) is a retired tennis player who played in the 1960s. She was born in St. Louis, Missouri.

== Accomplishments ==
She was ranked as high as No. 5 in the United States (1964), and was ranked 10th in 1960, 11th in 1961, 12th in 1962 and 7th in 1963.

She won the U.S. Indoor Singles title in 1963, the U.S. Hardcourt Singles title in 1962, and the Cincinnati singles title in 1960. She also was a singles finalist in Cincinnati in 1959.

In doubles, she won the U.S. Indoor Doubles title (with Mary-Ann Eisel) in 1963, 1964 and 1965, and in 1958 with Nancy O'Connell, and won the title in Cincinnati in 1960 with Justina Bricka.

== Biography ==
She attended Stanford University, where she won the Intercollegiate Doubles title with Linda Yeomans in 1962. She is a member of the Stanford Athletic Hall of Fame. Aucamp graduated from Washington University in St. Louis. She is married to Donald Aucamp.

== Grand Slam finals ==
=== Mixed doubles (1 runner-up) ===
Result	Year	Championship	Surface	Partner	Opponents	Score
Loss	1966	U.S. Championships	Grass	(United States) Ed Rubinoff	(United States) Donna Floyd (Australia) Owen Davidson	1–6, 3–6
