= 1964 Wimbledon Championships =

- Date: 22 June – 4 July
- Edition: 78th
- Category: Grand Slam
- Surface: Grass
- Location: Church Road; SW19, Wimbledon, London, United Kingdom
- Venue: All England Lawn Tennis and Croquet Club

Champions

Men's singles
- (Australia) Roy Emerson

Women's singles
- (Brazil) Maria Bueno

Men's doubles
- (Australia) Bob Hewitt / (Australia) Fred Stolle

Women's doubles
- (Australia) Margaret Smith / (Australia) Lesley Turner

Mixed doubles
- (Australia) Fred Stolle / (Australia) Lesley Turner

Boys' singles
- (United Arab Republic) Ismail El Shafei

Girls' singles
- (United States) Jane Bartkowicz
- Wimbledon Championships

The 1964 Wimbledon Championships took place on the outdoor grass courts at the All England Lawn Tennis and Croquet Club in Wimbledon, London, United Kingdom. The tournament was held from Monday 22 June until Saturday 4 July 1964. It was the 78th staging of the Wimbledon Championships, and the third Grand Slam tennis event of 1964. Roy Emerson and Maria Bueno won the singles titles.

== Champions ==
=== Seniors ===
==== Men's singles ====
(Australia) Roy Emerson defeated (Australia) Fred Stolle, 6–1, 12–10, 4–6, 6–3

==== Women's singles ====
(Brazil) Maria Bueno defeated (Australia) Margaret Smith, 6–4, 7–9, 6–3

==== Men's doubles ====
(Australia) Bob Hewitt / (Australia) Fred Stolle defeated (Australia) Roy Emerson / (Australia) Ken Fletcher, 7–5, 11–9, 6–4

==== Women's doubles ====
(Australia) Margaret Smith / (Australia) Lesley Turner defeated (United States) Billie Jean Moffitt / (United States) Karen Susman, 7–5, 6–2

==== Mixed doubles ====
(Australia) 'Fred Stolle / (Australia) Lesley Turner defeated (Australia) Ken Fletcher / (Australia) Margaret Smith, 6–4, 6–4

=== Juniors ===
==== Boys' singles ====
(United Arab Republic) Ismail El Shafei defeated (Soviet Union) Vladimir Korotkov, 6–2, 6–3

==== Girls' singles ====
(United States) Peaches Bartkowicz defeated (Mexico) Elena Subirats, 6–3, 6–1

Preceded by 1964 French Championships	Grand Slams	Succeeded by 1964 U.S. National Championships
