= Trudy Groenman =

Dutch former tennis player (born 1944)

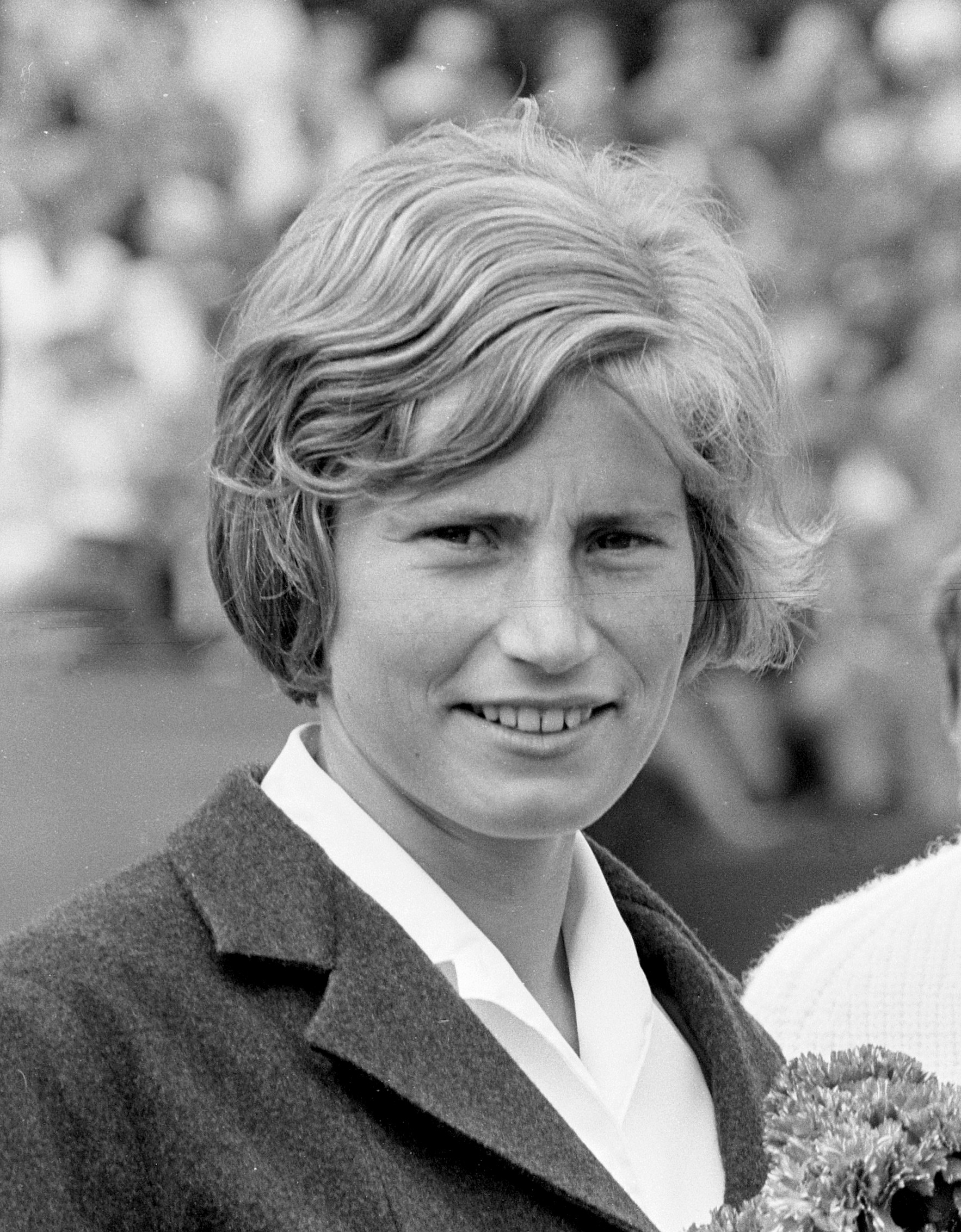
- Groenman in 1964
- Full name: Gertruida Johanna Groenman
- Country (sports): Netherlands
- Born: January 15, 1944 (age 81); Groningen, Netherlands
- Plays: Left-handed

Singles

Grand Slam singles results
- French Open: 2R (1965)
- Wimbledon: QF (1966 )

Mixed doubles

Grand Slam mixed doubles results
- Wimbledon: SF (1964)

Gertruida Johanna "Trudy" Groenman (born 15 January 1944) is a Dutch former tennis player. She was three times Netherlands champion.

== Career ==
Groenman was Netherlands girls' junior champion in 1961 in the 18-and-under class, and Netherlands women's champion in 1964, 1965 and 1966. In 1964 she also won the Netherlands national women's doubles championship, with Anja Lepoutre, a fellow member of the Groningen Lawn Tennis Club, and the Netherlands national mixed doubles championship, with Tom Okker. In 1965 and 1971 she again won the women's doubles championship, both times with Els Spruyt.

In international play, she reached the quarter-finals at Wimbledon in 1966. She and Tom Okker reached the semi-finals of the Wimbledon mixed doubles in 1964. In 1967 she reached the final of the US Indoors, where she lost to Billie Jean King 6–1, 6–0.

After marrying Christiaan Gerrit Walhof, she played under the name Trudy Walhof-Groenman. After a pause in her tennis career to raise a family, she became Netherlands senior champion, beating Els Veentje in the over-40s group. Since 1987 she has been married to Marinus Anton Holboom. She currently lives in The Hague.

Groenman was a left-handed player, whose style was compared to Billie Jean King's.

== Career finals ==
=== Singles (2 runner-ups) ===
Result	No.	Date	Tournament	Surface	Opponent	Score
Loss	1.	Jul 1966	Dutch Open, Hilversum, Netherlands	Clay	(South Africa) Annette Van Zyl	3–6, 1–6
Loss	2.	Feb 1967	U.S. Indoor Championships, Winchester, U.S.	Carpet (i)	(United States) Billie Jean King	1–6, 0–6
