= 1967 in tennis =

This page covers all the important events in the sport of tennis in 1967. It provides the results of notable tournaments throughout the year on both the 1967 ILTF Men's Tennis Circuit and 1967 ILTF Women's Tennis Circuit.

== Australian Open ==
Category	Champion(s)	Finalist(s)	Score
Men's singles	(Australia) Roy Emerson	(United States) Arthur Ashe	6–4, 6–1, 6–4
Women's singles	(United States) Nancy Richey	(Australia) Lesley Turner	6–1, 6–4
Men's doubles	(Australia) John Newcombe (Australia) Tony Roche	(Australia) Bill Bowrey (Australia) Owen Davidson	3–6, 6–3, 7–5, 6–8, 8–6
Women's doubles	(Australia) Judy Tegart (Australia) Lesley Turner	(Australia) Lorraine Robinson (France) Évelyne Terras	6–0, 6–2
Mixed doubles	(Australia) Owen Davidson (Australia) Lesley Turner	(Australia) Tony Roche (Australia) Judy Tegart	9–7, 6–4

== French Open ==
Category	Champion(s)	Finalist(s)	Score
Men's singles	(Australia) Roy Emerson	(Australia) Tony Roche	6–1, 6–4, 2–6, 6–2
Women's singles	(France) Françoise Dürr	(Australia) Lesley Turner	4–6, 6–3, 6–4
Men's doubles	(Australia) John Newcombe (Australia) Tony Roche	(Australia) Roy Emerson (Australia) Ken Fletcher	6–3, 9–7, 12–10
Women's doubles	(France) Françoise Dürr (Australia) Gail Sherriff	(South Africa) Annette Van Zyl (South Africa) Pat Walkden	6–2, 6–2
Mixed doubles	(United States) Billie Jean King (Australia) Owen Davidson	(United Kingdom) Ann Haydon-Jones (Romania) Ion Țiriac	6–3, 6–1

== Wimbledon ==
Category	Champion(s)	Finalist(s)	Score
Men's singles	(Australia) John Newcombe	(West Germany) Wilhelm Bungert	6–3, 6–1, 6–1
Women's singles	(United States) Billie Jean King	(United Kingdom) Ann Jones	6–3, 6–4
Men's doubles	(South Africa) Bob Hewitt (South Africa) Frew McMillan	(Australia) Roy Emerson (Australia) Ken Fletcher	6–2, 6–3, 6–4
Women's doubles	(United States) Rosie Casals (United States) Billie Jean King	(Brazil) Maria Bueno (United States) Nancy Richey	9–11, 6–4, 6–2
Mixed doubles	(Australia) Owen Davidson (United States) Billie Jean King	(Australia) Ken Fletcher (Brazil) Maria Bueno	7–5, 6–2

== US Open ==
Category	Champion(s)	Finalist(s)	Score
Men's singles	(Australia) John Newcombe	(United States) Clark Graebner	6–4, 6–4, 8–6
Women's singles	(United States) Billie Jean King	(United Kingdom) Ann Haydon Jones	11–9, 6–4
Men's doubles	(Australia) John Newcombe (Australia) Tony Roche	(Australia) William Bowrey (Australia) Owen Davidson	6–8, 9–7, 6–3, 6–3
Women's doubles	(United States) Rosie Casals (United States) Billie Jean King	(United States) Mary-Ann Eisel (United States) Donna Floyd	4–6, 6–3, 6–4
Mixed doubles	(United States) Billie Jean King (Australia) Owen Davidson	(United States) Rosie Casals (United States) Stan Smith	6–3, 6–2
