= 1967 Australian Championships – Mixed doubles =

Mixed doubles
- 1967 Australian Championships

Final
- Champions: (Australia) Owen Davidson; (Australia) Lesley Turner
- Runners-up: (Australia) Tony Roche; (Australia) Judy Tegart
- Score: 9–7, 6–4

Details
- Draw: 22
- Seeds: 8

Events
Singles	men	women
Doubles	men	women
- Australian Championships

Owen Davidson and Lesley Turner defeated defending champions Tony Roche and Judy Tegart in the final, 9–7, 6–4 to win the mixed doubles tennis title at the 1967 Australian Championships.

== Seeds ==
Champion seeds are indicated in bold text while text in italics indicates the round in which those seeds were eliminated. The top and bottom two seeded teams received byes into the second round.

1. (Australia) Judy Tegart / (Australia) Tony Roche (final)
2. (Australia) **Lesley Turner** / (Australia) **Owen Davidson (champions)**
3. (United States) Nancy Richey / (United States) Arthur Ashe (quarterfinals)
4. (United States) Rosemary Casals / (United States) Jim McManus (quarterfinals)
5. (France) Françoise Dürr / (Australia) Bill Bowrey (semifinals)
6. (Australia) Jan O'Neill / (Australia) Ray Ruffels (semifinals)
7. (Netherlands) Betty Stöve / (Belgium) Claude De Gronckel (second round)
8. (Australia) Lorraine Robinson / (Australia) Will Coghlan (second round)

== Draw ==
Key

- Q = Qualifier
- WC = Wild card
- LL = Lucky loser
- Alt = Alternate
- ITF = ITF entry
- PR = Protected ranking
- SR = Special ranking
- SE = Special exempt
- JE = Junior exempt
- JR = Junior Accelerator Programme entrant
- CO = College Accelerator Programme entrant
- NG = Next Gen Accelerator Program entrant
- w/o = Walkover
- r = Retired
- d = Defaulted

=== Final ===
Final

1
- (Australia) Tony Roche
- (Australia) Judy Tegart
7
4

2
- (Australia) **Owen Davidson**
- (Australia) **Lesley Turner**
**9**
**6**

== Top half ==
First round

Second round

Quarterfinals

Semifinals

1
- (Australia) **T. Roche**
- (Australia) **J. Tegart**
**6**
**6**

- (Australia) J. Cottrill
- (Australia) M. Jones
2
2

1
- (Australia) **T. Roche**
- (Australia) **J. Tegart**
**6**
**7**

- (Sweden) K. Andersson
- (Australia) K. Rosser
2
5

- (Sweden) **K. Andersson**
- (Australia) **K. Rosser**
w.
o.

8
- (Australia) W. Coghlan
- (Australia) L. Robinson

1
- (Australia) **T. Roche**
- (Australia) **J. Tegart**
**6**
**6**

5
- (Australia) B. Bowrey
- (France) F. Dürr
2
2

5
- (Australia) **B. Bowrey**
- (France) **F. Dürr**
**6**
**6**

- (Australia) **D. Power**
- (Australia) **S. Walsham**
**6**
**8**

- (Australia) D. Power
- (Australia) S. Walsham
0
3

- (Australia) B. Bowman
- (Australia) P. Brand
2
6

5
- (Australia) **B. Bowrey**
- (France) **F. Dürr**
**7**
**6**

- (Sweden) **B. Folke**
- (Netherlands) **L. Venneboer**
w.
o.

4
- (United States) J. McManus
- (United States) R. Casals
5
2

- (Australia) P. Richardson
- (Australia) G. Sherriff

- (Sweden) B. Folke
- (Netherlands) L. Venneboer
1
**9**
7

- (Australia) G. Penberthy
- (Australia) E. Fenton
4
4

4
- (United States) **J. McManus**
- (United States) **R. Casals**
**6**
7
**9**

4
- (United States) **J. McManus**
- (United States) **R. Casals**
**6**
**6**

== Bottom half ==
First round

Second round

Quarterfinals

Semifinals

3
- (United States) **A. Ashe**
- (United States) **N. Richey**
**6**
**6**

- (Australia) J. Cooper
- (Australia) M. Dunn
3
4

3
- (United States) **A. Ashe**
- (United States) **N. Richey**
**6**
**6**

- (United Kingdom) G. Stilwell
- (Australia) D. Born
3
5

- (Australia) A. Stone
- (Australia) H. Gourlay
3
4

- (Australia) **A. Stone**
- (Australia) **H. Gourlay**
**6**
**7**

3
- (United States) A. Ashe
- (United States) N. Richey
4
2

- (United States) J. Osborne
- (Australia) S. Stephen
2
4

6
- (Australia) **R. Ruffels**
- (Australia) **J. O'Neill**
**6**
**6**

- (Australia) **T. Addison**
- (Australia) **F. Toyne**
**6**
**6**

- (Australia) T. Addison
- (Australia) F. Toyne
**6**
7
2

6
- (Australia) **R. Ruffels**
- (Australia) **J. O'Neill**
2
**9**
**6**

6
- (Australia) R. Ruffels
- (Australia) J. O'Neill
5
4

2
- (Australia) **O. Davidson**
- (Australia) **L. Turner**
**7**
**6**

7
- (Belgium) C. De Gronckel
- (Netherlands) B. Stöve
4
**6**
1

- (Australia) **P. McPherson**
- (Australia) **J. Starr**
**6**
4
**6**

- (Australia) P. McPherson
- (Australia) J. Starr
2
4

2
- (Australia) **O. Davidson**
- (Australia) **L. Turner**
**6**
**6**

- (Australia) B. Higgins
- (Australia) J. Foster
1
5

2
- (Australia) **O. Davidson**
- (Australia) **L. Turner**
**6**
**7**
