= 1966 Wimbledon Championships – Women's doubles =

Women's doubles
- 1966 Wimbledon Championships

Final
- Champions: (Brazil) Maria Bueno (United States) Nancy Richey
- Runners-up: (Australia) Margaret Smith (Australia) Judy Tegart
- Score: 6–3, 4–6, 6–4

Details
- Draw: 48 (5Q)
- Seeds: 4

Events
Singles	men	women		boys	girls
Doubles	men	women	mixed	boys	girls
← 1965 ·	Wimbledon Championships	· 1967 →

Maria Bueno and Billie Jean King were the defending champions, but decided not to play together. King partnered with Rosie Casals but lost in the quarterfinals. Bueno played with Nancy Richey and they defeated Margaret Smith and Judy Tegart in the final, 6–3, 4–6, 6–4 to win the ladies' doubles tennis title at the 1966 Wimbledon Championships.

== Seeds ==
1. (Australia) Margaret Smith / (Australia) Judy Tegart (final)
2. (Brazil) Maria Bueno / (United States) Nancy Richey (champions)
3. (France) Françoise Dürr / (France) Janine Lieffrig (first round)
4. (United Kingdom) Ann Jones / (United Kingdom) Virginia Wade (semifinals)

Click on the seed number of a player to go to their draw section.

== Draw ==
Key

- Q = Qualifier
- WC = Wild card
- LL = Lucky loser
- Alt = Alternate
- ITF = ITF entry
- PR = Protected ranking
- SR = Special ranking
- SE = Special exempt
- JE = Junior exempt
- JR = Junior Accelerator Programme entrant
- CO = College Accelerator Programme entrant
- NG = Next Gen Accelerator Program entrant
- w/o = Walkover
- r = Retired
- d = Defaulted

=== Finals ===
Quarterfinals
1	(Australia) Margaret Smith (Australia) Judy Tegart	6	6
(United States) Rosie Casals (United States) Billie Jean King	3	4
4	(United Kingdom) Ann Jones (United Kingdom) Virginia Wade	6	8
(South Africa) Glenda Swan (Rhodesia) Pat Walkden	4	6
(Australia) Karen Krantzcke (Australia) Kerry Melville	6	7
(United States) Jane Albert (United States) Mimi Arnold	4	5
(United Kingdom) Winnie Shaw (United Kingdom) Joyce Williams	4	2
2	(Brazil) Maria Bueno (United States) Nancy Richey	6	6

Semifinals
1	(Australia) Margaret Smith (Australia) Judy Tegart	10	6
4	(United Kingdom) Ann Jones (United Kingdom) Virginia Wade	8	4
(Australia) Karen Krantzcke (Australia) Kerry Melville	2	3
2	(Brazil) Maria Bueno (United States) Nancy Richey	6	6

Final
1	(Australia) Margaret Smith (Australia) Judy Tegart	3	6	4
2	(Brazil) Maria Bueno (United States) Nancy Richey	6	4	6

=== Top half ===
==== Section 1 ====
First round

Second round
1	(Australia) Margaret Smith (Australia) Judy Tegart	8	6
(Argentina) Norma Baylon (South Africa) Annette Van Zyl	6	2
(Czechoslovakia) Jitka Volavková (Czechoslovakia) Vlasta Vopičková	6	3	7
(Australia) Trish Faulkner (Australia) Madonna Schacht	3	6	5
(Italy) Lucia Bassi (Italy) Maria Teresa Riedl	6	6
(United Kingdom) Vivienne Dennis (Australia) Margaret Harris	2	2
(Netherlands) Lidy Jansen Venneboer (Netherlands) Elsie Spruyt	4	4
(United States) Rosie Casals (United States) Billie Jean King	6	6

Third round
1	(Australia) M Smith (Australia) J Tegart	6	6
(Czechoslovakia) J Volavková (Czechoslovakia) V Vopičková	1	1
(Italy) L Bassi (Italy) MT Riedl	1	3
(United States) R Casals (United States) BJ King	6	6

Fourth round
1	(Australia) M Smith (Australia) J Tegart	6	6
(United States) R Casals (United States) BJ King	3	4

==== Section 2 ====
1st round
4	(United Kingdom) Ann Jones (United Kingdom) Virginia Wade	6	6
(West Germany) Edda Buding (West Germany) Helga Schultze	0	2
(United Kingdom) Shirley Brasher (United Kingdom) Robin Lloyd	2	6	2
(South Africa) Maryna Godwin (Australia) Helen Gourlay	6	4	6
(Sweden) Ingrid Löfdahl (Sweden) Eva Lundqvist	5	6	4
(United States) Mary-Ann Eisel (United States) Stephanie DeFina	7	3	6
(South Africa) Greta Delport (South Africa) Heather Segal	7	4	4
(United Kingdom) Angela Mortimer (United Kingdom) Pauline Roberts	5	6	6
(Canada) Vicki Berner (United States) Mary Habicht	2	6	6
(Soviet Union) Galina Baksheeva (Soviet Union) Olga Morozova	6	4	4
(South Africa) Glenda Swan (Rhodesia) Pat Walkden	6	6
(United Kingdom) Jill Mills (United Kingdom) Janet Ward	4	4
Q	(United Kingdom) Stephanie Percivall (United Kingdom) Jenny Wagstaff	3	1
(United Kingdom) Liz Starkie (Australia) Fay Toyne	6	6
(United States) Dorothy Knode (France) Isabelle de Lansalut	6	6
Q	(Sweden) EE Andersson (Sweden) Madelaine Pegel	2	2

Second round
4	(United Kingdom) A Jones (United Kingdom) V Wade	6	6
(South Africa) M Godwin (Australia) H Gourlay	1	1
(United States) M-A Eisel (United States) S DeFina	6	7
(United Kingdom) A Mortimer (United Kingdom) P Roberts	2	5
(Canada) V Berner (United States) M Habicht	4	0
(South Africa) G Swan (Rhodesia) P Walkden	6	6
(United Kingdom) E Starkie (Australia) F Toyne	6	6
(United States) D Knode (France) I de Lansalut	1	0

Third round
4	(United Kingdom) A Jones (United Kingdom) V Wade	6	6
(United States) M-A Eisel (United States) S DeFina	3	3
(South Africa) G Swan (Rhodesia) P Walkden	6	6
(United Kingdom) E Starkie (Australia) F Toyne	4	2

Fourth round
4	(United Kingdom) A Jones (United Kingdom) V Wade	6	8
(South Africa) G Swan (Rhodesia) P Walkden	4	6

=== Bottom half ===
==== Section 3 ====
First round
(Australia) Gail Sherriff (Netherlands) Betty Stöve	6	6
(United Kingdom) Alex Soady (United Kingdom) Janice Townsend	3	4
(United Kingdom) Rita Bentley (Australia) Jill Blackman	7	12
(United Kingdom) Heather Allen (United Kingdom) Rosemary Deloford	5	10
(United States) Carole Ann Loop (United States) Nancy Reed
(United States) Kathy Blake (United States) Donna Fales	w/o
(Australia) Karen Krantzcke (Australia) Kerry Melville	6	3	6
(West Germany) Helga Niessen (West Germany) Cora Schediwy	2	6	2
(Italy) Silvana Lazzarino (Italy) Lea Pericoli	3	2
(United States) Jane Albert (United States) Mimi Arnold	6	6
Q	(United Kingdom) G Chapman (United Kingdom) Wendy Hall	8	6
(United Kingdom) Frances MacLennan (United Kingdom) Mary McAnally	6	4
Q	(United Kingdom) Lynne Cullen-Smith (United Kingdom) Elizabeth Tew	6	6
(United Kingdom) Valerie Clark (United Kingdom) Joyce Fulton	3	2
(West Germany) Heide Orth (United Kingdom) Nell Truman	7	7
3	(France) Françoise Dürr (France) Janine Lieffrig	5	5

Second round
(Australia) G Sherriff (Netherlands) B Stöve	3	3
(United Kingdom) R Bentley (Australia) J Blackman	6	6
(United States) CA Loop (United States) N Reed	2	1
(Australia) K Krantzcke (Australia) K Melville	6	6
(United States) J Albert (United States) M Arnold	6	6
(United Kingdom) G Chapman (United Kingdom) Wendy Hall	3	4
(United Kingdom) L Cullen-Smith (United Kingdom) E Tew	7	6	6
(West Germany) H Orth (United Kingdom) E Truman	9	2	4

Third round
(United Kingdom) R Bentley (Australia) J Blackman	4	2
(Australia) K Krantzcke (Australia) K Melville	6	6
(United States) J Albert (United States) M Arnold	6	6
(United Kingdom) L Cullen-Smith (United Kingdom) E Tew	3	2

Fourth round
(Australia) K Krantzcke (Australia) K Melville	6	7
(United States) J Albert (United States) M Arnold	4	5

==== Section 4 ====
First round

Second round
(United Kingdom) Winnie Shaw (United Kingdom) Joyce Williams	6	6
(United Kingdom) Lorna Greville-Collins (United Kingdom) Carole Rosser	1	1
(Netherlands) Trudy Groenman (Netherlands) Elly Krocké	6	6
Q	(Australia) Lynn Bellamy (Australia) Dorothy Whitely	1	1
(Italy) Roberta Beltrame (Italy) Francesca Gordigiani	2	2
(United States) Tory Fretz (United States) Julie Heldman	6	6
(South Africa) Esmé Emmanuel (South Africa) Laura Rossouw	3	2
2	(Brazil) Maria Bueno (United States) Nancy Richey	6	6

Third round
(United Kingdom) W Shaw (United Kingdom) J Williams	4	6	9
(Netherlands) G Groenman (Netherlands) E Krocké	6	4	7
(United States) T Fretz (United States) J Heldman	1	1
(Brazil) M Bueno (United States) N Richey	6	6

Fourth round
(United Kingdom) W Shaw (United Kingdom) J Williams	4	2
2	(Brazil) M Bueno (United States) N Richey	6	6
