= 1966 Wimbledon Championships – Mixed doubles =

Tennis tournament

Mixed doubles
- 1966 Wimbledon Championships

Final
- Champions: (Australia) Ken Fletcher (Australia) Margaret Smith
- Runners-up: (United States) Dennis Ralston (United States) Billie Jean King
- Score: 4–6, 6–3, 6–3

Details
- Draw: 80 (5Q)
- Seeds: 4

Events
Singles	men	women		boys	girls
Doubles	men	women	mixed	boys	girls
← 1965 ·	Wimbledon Championships	· 1967 →

Ken Fletcher and Margaret Smith successfully defended their title, defeating Dennis Ralston and Billie Jean King in the final, 4–6, 6–3, 6–3 to win the mixed doubles tennis title at the 1966 Wimbledon Championships.

== Seeds ==
1. (Australia) Ken Fletcher / (Australia) Margaret Smith (champions)
2. n/a
3. (United States) Dennis Ralston / (United States) Billie Jean King (final)
4. (Australia) Fred Stolle / (France) Françoise Dürr (semifinals)

Click on the seed number of a player to go to their draw section.

== Draw ==
Key

- Q = Qualifier
- WC = Wild card
- LL = Lucky loser
- Alt = Alternate
- ITF = ITF entry
- PR = Protected ranking
- SR = Special ranking
- SE = Special exempt
- JE = Junior exempt
- JR = Junior Accelerator Programme entrant
- CO = College Accelerator Programme entrant
- NG = Next Gen Accelerator Program entrant
- w/o = Walkover
- r = Retired
- d = Defaulted

=== Finals ===
Quarterfinals
1	(Australia) Ken Fletcher (Australia) Margaret Smith	7	6
(South Africa) Bob Maud (South Africa) Glenda Swan	5	3
4	(Australia) Fred Stolle (France) Françoise Dürr	6	6
(United Kingdom) John Barrett (United Kingdom) Angela Mortimer	3	4
(Australia) Bob Howe (United States) Mary-Ann Eisel	5	3
3	(United States) Dennis Ralston (United States) Billie Jean King	7	6
(South Africa) Frew McMillan (South Africa) Annette Van Zyl	7	6
(Australia) Ray Ruffels (Australia) Karen Krantzcke	5	3

Semifinals
1	(Australia) Ken Fletcher (Australia) Margaret Smith	6	7
(Australia) Fred Stolle (France) Françoise Dürr	1	5
3	(United States) Dennis Ralston (United States) Billie Jean King	6	6
(South Africa) Frew McMillan (South Africa) Annette Van Zyl	4	4

Final
1	(Australia) Ken Fletcher (Australia) Margaret Smith	4	6	6
3	(United States) Dennis Ralston (United States) Billie Jean King	6	3	3

=== Top half ===
==== Section 1 ====
First round

Second round
1	(Australia) Ken Fletcher (Australia) Margaret Smith	6	7
(United States) Cliff Richey (United States) Nancy Richey	3	5
(Netherlands) Tom Okker (Netherlands) Trudy Groenman	6	6
(South Africa) Keith Diepraam (South Africa) YJ Wilkinson	3	2
(United Kingdom) Colin McHugo (United Kingdom) Wendy Hall	6	2	1
(New Zealand) Lew Gerrard (Netherlands) Elly Krocké	3	6	6
(Brazil) José Edison Mandarino (Spain) MT Cuadrado	2	3
(Rhodesia) Frank Salomon (Rhodesia) Pat Walkden	6	6

Third round
1	(Australia) K Fletcher (Australia) M Smith	9	6
(Netherlands) T Okker (Netherlands) G Groenman	7	3
(New Zealand) L Gerrard (Netherlands) E Krocké	4	6	6
(Rhodesia) F Salomon (Rhodesia) P Walkden	6	4	3

Fourth round
1	(Australia) K Fletcher (Australia) M Smith	6	6
(New Zealand) L Gerrard (Netherlands) E Krocké	4	2

==== Section 2 ====
First round

Second round
(United Kingdom) Billy Knight (United Kingdom) Jean Knight	4	6	3
(Soviet Union) Sergei Likhachev (Soviet Union) Galina Baksheeva	6	3	6
(South Africa) Ray Moore (South Africa) Esmé Emmanuel	6	6
(South Africa) Colin Zeeman (Australia) Carol Sherriff	4	4
(United States) Bob Lutz (United States) Kathleen Harter	6	7
(Japan) Ichizo Konishi (France) Isabelle de Lansalut	2	5
(Australia) Owen Davidson (Australia) Kerry Melville	4	6	4
(South Africa) Bob Maud (South Africa) Glenda Swan	6	4	6

Third round
(Soviet Union) S Likhachev (Soviet Union) G Baksheeva	w/o
(South Africa) R Moore (South Africa) E Emmanuel
(United States) R Lutz (United States) K Harter	3	6
(South Africa) R Maud (South Africa) G Swan	6	8

Fourth round
(South Africa) R Moore (South Africa) E Emmanuel	5	2
(South Africa) R Maud (South Africa) G Swan	7	6

==== Section 3 ====
First round

Second round
4	(Australia) Fred Stolle (France) Françoise Dürr	7	6
(United Kingdom) Roger Ambrose (United Kingdom) Sue Ambrose	5	3
(United Kingdom) Keith Wooldridge (United Kingdom) Joyce Williams	6	6
(West Germany) Lothar Pawlik (West Germany) Helga Niessen	4	0
(Italy) Sergio Tacchini (France) Nicole Seghers	1	2
Q	(India) Ravi Venkatesan (Netherlands) Lidy Jansen Venneboer	6	6
(United States) Clark Graebner (United Kingdom) Ann Jones	8	6
(Socialist Federal Republic of Yugoslavia) Nikola Pilić (Argentina) Norma Baylon	6	2

Third round
4	(Australia) F Stolle (France) F Dürr	6	6
(United Kingdom) K Wooldridge (United Kingdom) J Williams	3	3
Q	(India) R Venkatesan (Netherlands) L Jansen Venneboer	0	0
(United States) C Graebner (United Kingdom) A Jones	6	6

Fourth round
4	(Australia) F Stolle (France) F Dürr	8	6	6
(United States) C Graebner (United Kingdom) A Jones	10	4	4

==== Section 4 ====
First round
(Japan) Isao Watanabe (United States) Dorothy Knode	1	4
(United Kingdom) Graham Stilwell (United Kingdom) Nell Truman	6	6
(South Africa) Terry Ryan (South Africa) Greta Delport	6	6
(United Kingdom) Michael Hann (United Kingdom) Lorna Greville-Collins	1	4
(Australia) Martin Mulligan (Australia) Madonna Schacht	3	6	6
(United Kingdom) Paul Hutchins (United Kingdom) Heather Allen	6	3	4
(Australia) Jimmy Moore (Australia) Fay Toyne	3	1
(Denmark) Torben Ulrich (France) Janine Lieffrig	6	6
(France) Jean-Claude Barclay (France) Évelyne Terras	4	6	11
(United Kingdom) Peter Curtis (United Kingdom) Virginia Wade	6	1	9
(Italy) Alberto Lazzarino (Italy) Silvana Lazzarino	4	1
(United Kingdom) John Barrett (United Kingdom) Angela Mortimer	6	6
(United States) Bill Tym (United States) Alice Tym	9	4	1
(Austria) Peter Pokorny (Austria) Sonja Pachta	7	6	6
(United Kingdom) Malcolm Gibb (United Kingdom) Pauline Roberts	3	3
(United States) Marty Riessen (West Germany) Edda Buding	6	6

Second round
(United Kingdom) G Stilwell (United Kingdom) E Truman	4	6	5
(South Africa) T Ryan (South Africa) M Delport	6	1	7
(Australia) M Mulligan (Australia) M Schacht	4	6	5
(Denmark) T Ulrich (France) J Lieffrig	6	3	7
(France) J-C Barclay (France) É Terras	5	3
(United Kingdom) J Barrett (United Kingdom) A Mortimer	7	6
(Austria) P Pokorny (Austria) S Pachta	1	3
(United States) M Riessen (West Germany) E Buding	6	6

Third round
(South Africa) T Ryan (South Africa) M Delport	6	1	11
(Denmark) T Ulrich (France) J Lieffrig	3	6	13
(United Kingdom) J Barrett (United Kingdom) A Mortimer	6	6
(United States) M Riessen (West Germany) E Buding	2	4

Fourth round
(Denmark) T Ulrich (France) J Lieffrig	3	9
(United Kingdom) J Barrett (United Kingdom) A Mortimer	6	11

=== Bottom half ===
==== Section 5 ====
First round
(Australia) John Newcombe (Australia) Angie Newcombe	2	8	4
(Belgium) Eric Drossart (Belgium) Christiane Mercelis	6	6	6
(South Africa) Peter van Lingen (Canada) Faye Urban	6	7	3
(United Kingdom) Stanley Matthews (United Kingdom) Frances MacLennan	8	5	6
(Colombia) William Álvarez (Australia) Jill Blackman	6	6
(Chile) Ernesto Aguirre (Spain) Ana María Estalella	1	2
(United States) Stan Smith (United States) Kathy Blake	w/o
(Australia) Brenton Higgins (United Kingdom) Mary McAnally
(Australia) Bob Howe (United States) Mary-Ann Eisel	6	6
(Australia) JC Fletcher (United Kingdom) Valerie Clark	2	3
(United Kingdom) Gerald Battrick (United Kingdom) Winnie Shaw	11	5	6
(United States) Donald Dell (South Africa) Heather Segal	9	7	1
(United Kingdom) Tony Pickard (United Kingdom) Liz Starkie	9	6
(United Kingdom) Mark Cox (United Kingdom) Alison Stroud	7	4
(Chile) Jaime Pinto Bravo (Netherlands) Elsie Spruyt	3	8
(United Kingdom) Alan Mills (United Kingdom) Jill Mills	6	10

Second round
(Belgium) E Drossart (Belgium) C Mercelis	6	8
(United Kingdom) S Matthews (United Kingdom) F MacLennan	2	6
(Colombia) W Álvarez (Australia) J Blackman	6	6
(Australia) B Higgins (United Kingdom) M McAnally	2	2
(Australia) R Howe (United States) M-A Eisel	7	6
(United Kingdom) G Battrick (United Kingdom) W Shaw	5	4
(United Kingdom) A Pickard (United Kingdom) E Starkie	5	1
(United Kingdom) A Mills (United Kingdom) J Mills	7	6

Third round
(Belgium) E Drossart (Belgium) C Mercelis	1	5
(Colombia) W Álvarez (Australia) J Blackman	6	7
(Australia) R Howe (United States) M-A Eisel	8	6
(United Kingdom) A Mills (United Kingdom) J Mills	6	3

Fourth round
(Colombia) W Álvarez (Australia) J Blackman	5	6	8
(Australia) R Howe (United States) M-A Eisel	7	4	10

==== Section 6 ====
First round

Second round
Q	(Australia) John Decker (Australia) Margaret Harris	6	8
Q	(United Kingdom) John Harrison (United Kingdom) Elizabeth Tew	1	6
(Italy) Giordano Maioli (Italy) Lucia Bassi	6	6
(Australia) Bob Hewitt (South Africa) Dalaille Hewitt	3	3
(South Africa) Jack Saul (United Kingdom) Robin Lloyd	4	2
(New Zealand) John McDonald (United States) Tory Fretz	6	6
(Spain) José Luis Arilla (Sweden) Ingrid Löfdahl	4	6
3	(United States) Dennis Ralston (United States) Billie Jean King	6	8

Third round
Q	(Australia) J Decker (Australia) M Harris	6	6
(Italy) G Maioli (Italy) L Bassi	3	1
(New Zealand) J McDonald (United States) T Fretz	1	2
3	(United States) D Ralston (United States) BJ King	6	6

Fourth round
Q	(Australia) J Decker (Australia) M Harris	0	0
3	(United States) D Ralston (United States) BJ King	6	6

==== Section 7 ====
First round

Second round
(Czechoslovakia) Jiří Javorský (Czechoslovakia) Vlasta Vopičková	8	3
(United Kingdom) Geoff Bluett (United Kingdom) Shirley Brasher	10	6
(Sweden) Ove Bengtson (Sweden) Eva Lundqvist	2	4
(Finland) Pekka Säilä (United Kingdom) Rita Bentley	6	6
(South Africa) Frew McMillan (South Africa) Annette Van Zyl	6	7
(Canada) Keith Carpenter (Canada) Vicki Berner	4	5
(South Africa) Cliff Drysdale (South Africa) Vivienne Wiggill	6	2	4
Q	(South Africa) Glenn Grisillo (West Germany) Cora Schediwy	3	6	6

Third round
(United Kingdom) G Bluett (United Kingdom) S Brasher	8	6
(Finland) P Säilä (United Kingdom) R Bentley	6	4
(South Africa) F McMillan (South Africa) A Van Zyl	10	6
Q	(South Africa) G Grisillo (West Germany) C Schediwy	8	2

Fourth round
(United Kingdom) G Bluett (United Kingdom) S Brasher	4	4
(South Africa) F McMillan (South Africa) A Van Zyl	6	6

==== Section 8 ====
First round

Second round
(United Kingdom) Clay Iles (Australia) Dorothy Whitely	2	3
(Australia) Ray Ruffels (Australia) Karen Krantzcke	6	6
(United States) Jim McManus (United States) Rosie Casals	6	6
Q	(United States) Rudy Hernando (United States) Susan Behlmar	4	3
(France) Michel Leclercq (France) Christiane Spinoza	0	5
(South Africa) Abe Segal (West Germany) Helga Schultze	6	7
(Ecuador) Pancho Guzmán (Australia) Helen Gourlay	6	3	2
(Australia) Bill Bowrey (Australia) Judy Tegart	3	6	6

Third round
(Australia) Ray Ruffels (Australia) Karen Krantzcke	7	6
(United States) J McManus (United States) R Casals	5	2
(South Africa) A Segal (West Germany) H Schultze	6	3	1
(Australia) W Bowrey (Australia) J Tegart	2	6	6

Fourth round
(Australia) Ray Ruffels (Australia) Karen Krantzcke	4	6	'14
(Australia) W Bowrey (Australia) J Tegart	6	2	12
