= 1967 French Championships – Women's singles =

Women's singles
- 1967 French Championships

Final
- Champion: (France) Françoise Dürr
- Runner-up: (Australia) Lesley Turner
- Score: 4–6, 6–3, 6–4

Details
- Seeds: 16

Events
Singles	men	women
Doubles	men	women
- French Championships

Sixth-seeded Françoise Dürr defeated Lesley Turner in the final 4–6, 6–3, 6–4, to win the women's singles tennis title at the 1967 French Championships.

== Seeds ==
The seeded players are listed below. Françoise Dürr is the champion; others show the round in which they were eliminated.

1. (United States) Billie Jean King (quarterfinals)
2. (United Kingdom) Ann Jones (quarterfinals)
3. (Brazil) Maria Bueno (quarterfinals)
4. (Australia) Lesley Turner (finalist)
5. (United States) Rosie Casals (fourth round)
6. (France) Françoise Dürr (champion)
7. (Australia) Kerry Melville (semifinals)
8. (Australia) Judy Tegart (fourth round)
9. (South Africa) Annette Van Zyl (semifinals)
10. (United States) Tory Fretz (third round)
11. (Australia) Karen Krantzcke (second round)
12. (West Germany) Helga Schultze (quarterfinals)
13. (Soviet Union) Galina Baksheeva (fourth round)
14. (United Kingdom) Virginia Wade (fourth round)
15. (South Africa) Patricia Walkden (fourth round)
16. (Australia) Gail Sherriff (fourth round)

== Draw ==
=== Key ===
- Q = Qualifier
- WC = Wild card
- LL = Lucky loser
- r = Retired

=== Finals ===
Quarterfinals
1	(United States) Billie Jean King	2	7	4
9	(South Africa) Annette Van Zyl	6	5	6
4	(Australia) Lesley Turner	7	6
12	(West Germany) Helga Schultze	5	2
6	(France) Françoise Dürr	5	6	6
3	(Brazil) Maria Bueno	7	1	4
7	(Australia) Kerry Melville	0	6	8
2	(United Kingdom) Ann Jones	6	4	6

Semifinals
9	(South Africa) Annette Van Zyl	1	4
4	(Australia) Lesley Turner	6	6
6	(France) Françoise Dürr	8	6
7	(Australia) Kerry Melville	6	3

Finals
4	(Australia) Lesley Turner	6	3	4
6	(France) Françoise Dürr	4	6	6

=== Earlier rounds ===
==== Section 1 ====
First round

Second round
1	(United States) King	6	6
(Spain) Mandarino	0	0
(South Africa) Delport	6	6	0
(Australia) Gourlay	0	8	6
16	(Australia) Sherriff	6	7
(United States) Kalogeropoulos	1	5
(United States) Netter	5	3
(Hungary) Széll	7	6

Third round
1	(United States) King	6	9
(Australia) Gourlay	0	7
16	(Australia) Sherriff	7	6
(Hungary) Széll	5	2

Fourth round
1	(United States) King	6	6
16	(Australia) Sherriff	1	3

==== Section 2 ====
First round
(Romania) Bucur
8	(Australia) Tegart
(South Africa) Emmanuel	4	3
(Italy) Gordigiani	6	6
(Italy) Beltrame	4	3
(United States) Fales	6	6
(Hungary) Polgár	3	6	6
(France) de Roubin	6	1	8
(Mexico) Gongora	3	3
9	(South Africa) Van Zyl	6	6
(Australia) Alexander	w/o
(France) Bouteleux
(France) Boulle	3	3
(West Germany) Buding	6	6
(Soviet Union) Morozova	5	4
(Australia) Toyne	7	6

Second round
8	(Australia) Tegart	6	6
(Italy) Gordigiani	3	0
(United States) Fales	6	6
(France) de Roubin	4	1
9	(South Africa) Van Zyl	6	7
(France) Bouteleux	4	5
(West Germany) Buding	4	4
(Australia) Toyne	6	6

Third round
8	(Australia) Tegart	6	1	7
(United States) Fales	3	6	5
9	(South Africa) Van Zyl	6	7
(Australia) Toyne	3	5

Fourth round
8	(Australia) Tegart	3	1
9	(South Africa) Van Zyl	6	6

==== Section 3 ====
First round
(United Kingdom) Williams
4	(Australia) Turner
(Canada) Brown	6	6	6
(Netherlands) Stöve	4	8	8
(Spain) Aubet	7	4
(France) De Lansalut	9	6
(United States) Eisel	6	1	3
(Czechoslovakia) Vopičková	2	6	6
(Netherlands) Groenman	6	3
13	(Soviet Union) Baksheeva	8	6
(Canada) Urban	6	4	1
(France) Lieffrig	1	6	6
(Spain) Estalella	2	6
(United Kingdom) Truman	6	8
(Hungary) Peterdy-Wolf	3	3
(Sweden) Sandulf	6	6

Second round
4	(Australia) Turner	6	6
(Netherlands) Stöve	0	1
(France) De Lansalut	3	4
(Czechoslovakia) Vopičková	6	6
13	(Soviet Union) Baksheeva	8	6
(France) Lieffrig	6	4
(United Kingdom) Truman	6	6
(Sweden) Sandulf	2	2

Third round
4	(Australia) Turner	6	6
(Czechoslovakia) Vopičková	3	3
13	(Soviet Union) Baksheeva	6	6
(United Kingdom) Truman	2	4

Fourth round
4	(Australia) Turner	6	6
13	(Soviet Union) Baksheeva	4	2

==== Section 4 ====
First round
(United Kingdom) Holdsworth	2	4
5	(United States) Casals	6	6
(Sweden) Andersson	5	2
(France) Langanay	7	6
(France) Spinoza
(United Kingdom) Shaw
(Mexico) Subirats	4	0
(Italy) Giorgi	6	6
(Ecuador) Zuleta	1	1
12	(West Germany) Schultze	6	6
(Sweden) Sandberg	6	7	2
(United Kingdom) Greville-Collins	4	9	6
(Australia) Langsford	0	2
(France) Terras	6	6
(United Kingdom) Allen
(South Africa) Van Deventer

Second round
5	(United States) Casals	6	6
(France) Langanay	3	4
(United Kingdom) Shaw	4	6	5
(Italy) Giorgi	6	2	7
12	(West Germany) Schultze	6	6
(United Kingdom) Greville-Collins	0	4
(France) Terras	7	6
(United Kingdom) Allen	5	4

Third round
5	(United States) Casals	6	6
(Italy) Giorgi	4	4
12	(West Germany) Schultze	6	6
(France) Terras	2	1

Fourth round
5	(United States) Casals	1	4
12	(West Germany) Schultze	6	6

==== Section 5 ====
First round
(Australia) Sherriff	7	2	3
(Sweden) Lundqvist	5	6	6
(Hungary) Szörényi
(France) Kermina
(Mexico) P Montaño	1	1
(Soviet Union) Dmitrieva	6	6
(South Africa) Rossouw	6	4	3
11	(Australia) Krantzcke	3	6	6
(Argentina) Vrancovich	4	2
(United States) Harter	6	6
(Sweden) Löfdahl
(West Germany) Schediwy
(United Kingdom) Lloyd	6	5	3
(United States) De Fina	3	7	6
(South Africa) Swan	2	1
6	(France) Dürr	6	6

Second round
(Sweden) Lundqvist
(France) Kermina
(Soviet Union) Dmitrieva	4	6	6
11	(Australia) Krantzcke	6	1	3
(United States) Harter	3	6	6
(Sweden) Löfdahl	6	3	2
(United States) De Fina	3	7	1
6	(France) Dürr	6	5	6

Third round
(Sweden) Lundqvist	4	2
(Soviet Union) Dmitrieva	6	6
(United States) Harter	0	4
6	(France) Dürr	6	6

Fourth round
(Soviet Union) Dmitrieva	5	1
6	(France) Dürr	7	6

==== Section 6 ====
First round
(Belgium) Loeys	2	3
(France) Darmon	6	6
(United States) McLean	3	6	5
(Canada) Berner	6	4	7
(France) Le Besnerais	4	0
(Czechoslovakia) Palmeova West	6	6
(Brazil) Cleto	1	1
14	(United Kingdom) Wade	6	6
(Mexico) O Montaño	0	0
(South Africa) Godwin	6	6
(Australia) Hole	0	1
(United States) Henreid	6	6
(United Kingdom) McAnally	4	3
(France) Rees-Lewis	6	6
(Socialist Federal Republic of Yugoslavia) Skulj
3	(Brazil) Bueno

Second round
(France) Darmon	6	6
(Canada) Berner	3	2
(Czechoslovakia) Palmeova West	7	0
14	(United Kingdom) Wade	9	6
(South Africa) Godwin	6	6
(United States) Henreid	2	3
(France) Rees-Lewis	2	4
3	(Brazil) Bueno	6	6

Third round
(France) Darmon	4	3
14	(United Kingdom) Wade	6	6
(South Africa) Godwin	3	0
3	(Brazil) Bueno	6	6

Fourth round
14	(United Kingdom) Wade	1	5
3	(Brazil) Bueno	6	7

==== Section 7 ====
First round
(France) Burel	7	1	9
(West Germany) Seelbach	5	6	7
(Australia) Cottrill
(United States) Morris
(Sweden) E Leijonhufvud	1	1
(Italy) Riedl	6	6
(France) Seghers	0	0
10	(United States) Fretz	6	6
(West Germany) Hacks
(South Africa) Rix
(Ecuador) Guzman	1	1
(France) Salfati	6	6
(United States) Knode	7	6
(Sweden) Pegel	5	8
(Netherlands) Jansen Venneboer	3	1
7	(Australia) Melville	6	6

Second round
(France) Burel	6	6
(United States) Morris	2	3
(Italy) Riedl	6	4	3
10	(United States) Fretz	1	6	6
(South Africa) Rix
(France) Salfati
(Sweden) Pegel	0	4
7	(Australia) Melville	6	6

Third round
(France) Burel	6	3	8
10	(United States) Fretz	4	6	6
(France) Salfati	6	6	5
7	(Australia) Melville	3	8	7

Fourth round
(France) Burel	3	6	3
7	(Australia) Melville	6	2	6

==== Section 8 ====
First round

Second round
(France) Venturino	6	2	2
(Australia) O'Neill	4	6	6
(United States) Tym	2	0
15	(South Africa) Walkden	6	6
(Switzerland) Studer	1	1
(United States) Blake	6	6
(Colombia) Palacios	0	1
2	(United Kingdom) Jones	6	6

Third round
(Australia) O'Neill	4	3
15	(South Africa) Walkden	6	6
(United States) Blake	3	0
2	(United Kingdom) Jones	6	6

Fourth round
15	(South Africa) Walkden	2	2
2	(United Kingdom) Jones	6	6

Preceded by 1967 Australian Championships – Women's singles	Grand Slam women's singles	Succeeded by 1967 Wimbledon Championships – Women's singles
