= Sven Ginman =

Swedish tennis player

- Country (sports): Sweden
- Residence: Värmdö
- Born: 11 July 1948 (age 76)
- Plays: Right-handed
- College: University of Miami

Singles
- Career record: 1–3

Grand Slam singles results
- Australian Open: 1R (1967)
- Wimbledon: Q1 (1966, 1967)

Sven Ginman (born 11 July 1948) is a former Swedish tennis player.

== Career ==
Ginman, with partner John Bartlett, was the boys' doubles champion at the 1967 Australian Open. He also played in the men's singles draw at the 1967 Australian Open and lost in five sets in the first round to the fifteenth seed, Will Coghlan.

Ginman, though a junior, participated in the qualifying draw for the men's singles at Wimbledon in 1966 and 1967, losing the first round of the qualifying on both occasions.

He attended college in the United States at the University of Miami, where he was a member of the university's tennis team from 1967 to 1970. Ginman twice participated at the Grand Prix tournament in St. Petersburg, United States, where in 1968 he lost in the second round to Mike Belkin and in 1970 he lost in the second round, to Tom Edlefsen.

== Junior Grand Slam titles ==
=== Doubles: 1 ===
Result	Year	Championship	Surface	Partner	Opponents	Score
Win	1967	Australian Open	Grass	(Australia) John Bartlett	(Australia) Dave Wright (Australia) Ian Fletcher	6–3, 6–5
