= Lidy Venneboer =

Dutch tennis player

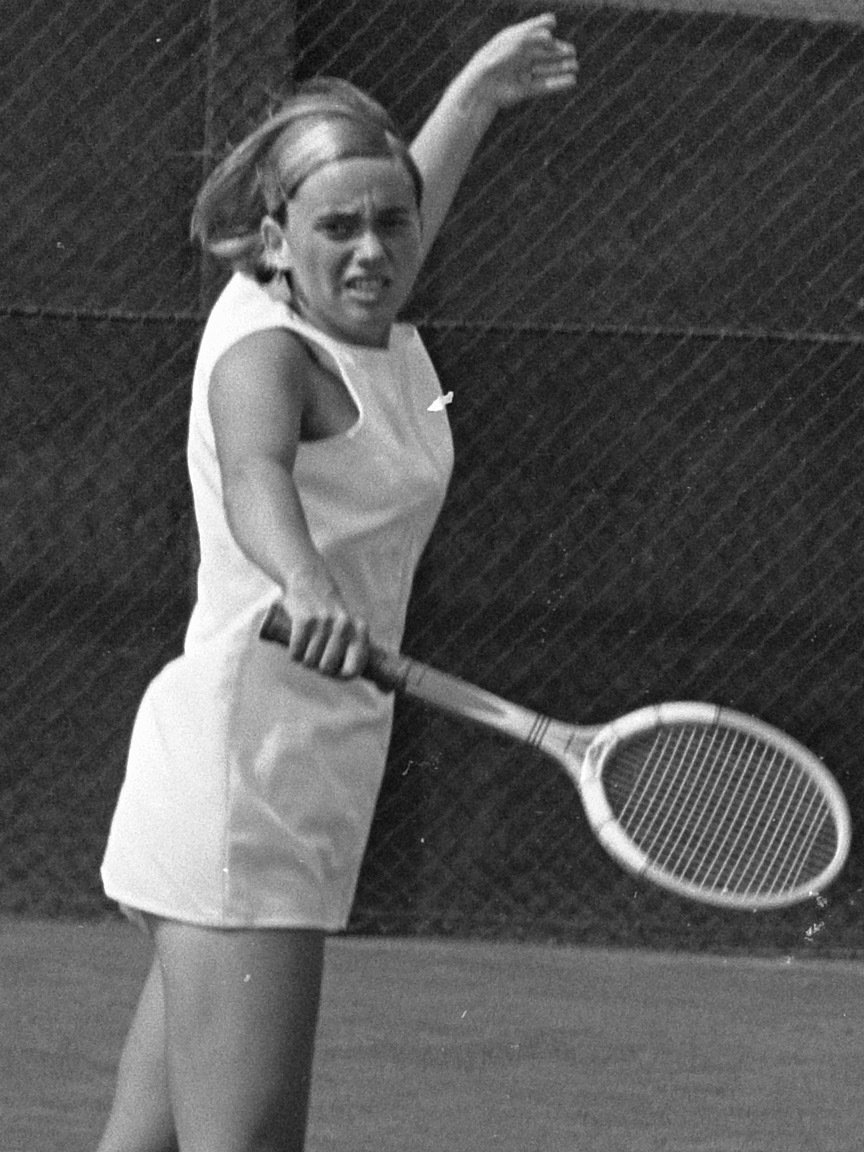
- Full name: Lydia Jansen Venneboer
- Country (sports): Netherlands
- Born: 17 August 1946 (age 80)

Grand Slam singles results
- Australian Open: 2R (1967)
- French Open: 1R (1967)
- Wimbledon: 3R (1966)

Grand Slam doubles results
- Australian Open: SF (1967)
- French Open: 1R (1967)
- Wimbledon: 3R (1967)

Grand Slam mixed doubles results
- Australian Open: 2R (1967)
- French Open: 1R (1967)
- Wimbledon: 3R (1966, 1968)

Lydia Jansen Venneboer (born 17 August 1946), better known as Lidy Venneboer, is a Dutch former amateur tennis player. Jansen Venneboer is her maiden name, which became Kirsch-Jansen Venneboer after marriage.

Venneboer, a native of Doetinchem, was the Dutch junior champion at age 17 and featured in several grand slam main draws while on tour in the late 1960s. She was a doubles semi-finalist with Betty Stöve at the 1967 Australian Championships.

In 1968 she featured in the final of the Federation Cup with the Netherlands. The Dutch, appearing in their first ever final, came up against Australia and lost both singles rubbers to surrender the tie. Venneboer only played in the doubles, partnering Astrid Suurbeek, with whom she had won the deciding semi-final rubber over Mary-Ann Eisel and Nancy Richey of the United States. In the final she and Suurbeek lost the dead rubber to Margaret Court and Kerry Melville, but did manage to win a set over the Australians.

Retiring at the age of 22, Venneboer raised two children with her German husband and now lives in the North Rhine-Westphalia town of Werther.

== See also ==
- List of Netherlands Fed Cup team representatives
