= Birger Folke =

Swedish tennis player (1936–2020)

- Country (sports): Sweden
- Born: 3 March 1936; Tranås, Sweden
- Died: 17 September 2020 (aged 84); Stockholm, Sweden
- Turned pro: 1954 (amateur tour)
- Retired: 1969

Singles
- Career record: 52–51
- Career titles: 2

Grand Slam singles results
- Australian Open: 1R (1967)
- French Open: 1R (1967)

Doubles
- Career record: 1–3

Grand Slam doubles results
- Australian Open: 2R (1967)

Mixed doubles

Grand Slam mixed doubles results
- Australian Open: 2R (1967)
- Wimbledon: 3R (1971)

Birger Kjell Herbert Folke (3 March 1936 - 17 September 2020) was a Swedish tennis player and television commentator.

== Tennis career ==
In 1954 Folke participated in the Wimbledon Junior Championships. From 1954, up to the end of the 1960s he competed internationally and won two tournaments in his career. In July 1963 he won the New York State Clay Courts tournament held in Long Island in the United States. In April 1967 he won the Connaught Hard Court Championships in Chingford, Great Britain, beating his compatriot, Lars Ölander in the final.

Folke participated in the singles draw of two Grand Slam events, the 1967 Australian Championships and the 1976 French Open. In 1971, at the age of 35, he returned to Wimbledon to compete in the mixed doubles event in partnership with fellow Swede, Christina Sandberg. During the period 1967 to 1969, Folke was captain of the Swedish Davis Cup team.

Folke also worked as a TV commentator with expert opinion on the Eurosport TV channel.
