= South-West Districts Championships =

Defunct tennis tournament
- Tour: ILTF World Circuit (1950–1972); ILTF Independent Circuit (1973–1979)
- Founded: 1950; 75 years ago
- Abolished: 1982; 43 years ago
- Location: Warrnambool, Victoria, Australia
- Venue: Warrnambool Lawn Tennis Club
- Surface: Grass / outdoor

The South-West Districts Championships was a combined men's and women's grass court tennis tournament founded in 1950. The tournament was played at the Warrnambool Lawn Tennis Club, Warrnambool, Victoria, Australia, and ran annually until 1979 when it was discontinued as part of the ILTF Independent Circuit.

== History ==
In March 1950 the first South Western Districts Championships were founded. The winner of the men's singles title was Ken McGregor. The winner of the women's singles event was won by Joy Strickland. The event was played annually on outdoor grass courts at the Warrnambool Lawn Tennis Club, Warrnambool, Victoria, Australia throughout its run. It initially ran annually as part of the ILTF Australasia Circuit, a global regional sub circuit of the larger ILTF World Circuit until 1969 for men, then 1972 for women before it then became part of the ILTF Independent Circuit (those events not part of the men's ILTF Grand Prix Circuit or women's Virginia Slims Circuit until 1979 when it was downgraded from that tour.

Today the venue for these former championships being the Warrnambool Tennis Club is one of the largest tennis facilities in Australia. With 26 grass courts, 6 porous courts and 2 plexipave courts.

== Finals ==
=== Men's singles ===
| Year | Champions | Runners-up | Score |
|---|---|---|---|
| 1950 | (Australia) Ken McGregor | (Australia) David Yates | 9–7, 6–3. |
| 1951 | (Australia) Keith Rogers | (Australia) Alan Cook | 6–2, 6–1. |
| 1952 | (Australia) Frank Cornall | (Australia) Doug Reid | 6–3, 2–6, 6–2. |
| 1953 | (Australia) Warren Kennedy | (Australia) Doug Reid | 8–6, 3–6, 6–2. |
| 1954 | (Australia) Warren Kennedy (2) | (Australia) John Fraser | 6–3, 6–3. |
| 1955 | (Australia) Philip Brophy | (Australia) Colin Pym | 6–1, 9–7. |
| 1956 | (Australia) Warren Kennedy (3) | (Australia) Brian Tobin | w.o. |
| 1957 | (Australia) Ashley Cooper | (Australia) Mal Anderson | 7–5, 6–3. |
| 1958 | (Australia) Neale Fraser | (Australia) John Fraser | 6–3, 6–1. |
| 1959 | (Australia) Cedric Mason | (Australia) Paul Hearnden | 6–4, 6–3. |
| 1960 | (Australia) Bob Mark | (Australia) Brian Tobin | 2–6, 8–6, 6–1. |
| 1961 | (Australia) Bob Carmichael | (Australia) Graeme Cumbrae-Stewart | 4–6, 6–3, 6–3. |
| 1962 | (Australia) Cedric Mason (2) | (Australia) Graeme Cumbrae-Stewart | 6–4, 2–6, 6–1. |
| 1963 | (Australia) Owen Davidson | (Australia) Neale Fraser | 6–4, 4–6, 6–4. |
| 1964 | (Australia) Will Coghlan | (Australia) John Sharpe | 6–4, 6–3. |
| 1965 | (Australia) Tony Roche | (New Zealand) Ron McKenzie | w.o. |
| 1966 | (Australia) Will Coghlan (2) | (New Zealand) Ron McKenzie | 6–4, 6–4. |
| 1967 | (Australia) Ray Ruffels | (Australia) John Fraser | 6–4, 3–6, 8–6. |
| 1968 | (Australia) Will Coghlan (3) | (Australia) Brian Tobin | 6–2, 6–2. |
↓ Open Era ↓
| 1969 | (Australia) Syd Ball | (Australia) Cedric Mason | 6–1, 6–2. |
| 1970 | (Australia) Frank Sedgman | (Australia) Anthony Hammond | 6–3, 6–1. |
| 1971 | (Australia) Cliff Letcher | (Australia) Brian Hill | 6–2, 6–3. |
| 1972 | (Australia) Frank Sedgman (2) | (Australia) Cliff Letcher | 4–6, 6–4, 6–2. |
| 1973 | (Australia) Cliff Letcher (2) | (Australia) Frank Sedgman | 5–7, 6–4, 6–2. |
| 1974 | (Australia) Peter McNamara | (Australia) Cliff Letcher | 1–6, 7–6, 6–3. |
| 1975 | (Australia) Paul McNamee | (Australia) John Trickey | 6–4, 3–6, 6–4. |
| 1976 | (Australia) Peter McNamara (2) | (Australia) Bob Carmichael | 6–4, 6–4. |
| 1977 | (Australia) Will Coghlan (4) | (Australia) Trevor Little | 6–2, 6–3. |
| 1978 | (Australia) Will Coghlan (5) | (Australia) Trevor Little | 6–7, 6–4, 3–1 ret. |
| 1979 | (Australia) Will Coghlan (6) | (Australia) Bill Durham | 7–5, 6–2. |

=== Women's singles ===
| Year | Champions | Runners-up | Score |
|---|---|---|---|
| 1950 | (Australia) Joy Strickland | (Australia) Lynne Lamb | 6–3, 8–6 |
| 1951 | (Australia) Robyn Strachan | (Australia) Mavis Robertson | 1–6, 6–3, 6–4 |
| 1952 | (Australia) Margaret Wallis | (Australia) Robyn Strachan | 6–2, 6–3 |
| 1953 | (Australia) Norma Ellis | (Australia) Margery Williams | 6–2, 6–2 |
| 1954 | (Australia) Margery Williams | (Australia) Beverly Malcolm | 6–4, 6–1 |
| 1955 | (Australia) Norma Ellis (2) | (Australia) Elizabeth Orton | 6–4, 6–1 |
| 1956 | (Australia) Maureen McCalman | (Australia) Betty Ruffin | 6–4, 6–1 |
| 1957 | (Australia) Beverly Rae | (Australia) Margaret Carter | 6–1, 6–1 |
| 1958 | (Australia) Beverly Rae (2) | (Australia) Pam Southcombe Wearne | 2–6, 6–2, 8–6 |
| 1959 | (Australia) Thelma Coyne Long | (Australia) Beverly Rae | 6–4, 6–2 |
| 1960 | (Australia) Lorraine Coghlan Robinson | (Australia) L. Masson | 6–4, 6–2 |
| 1961 | (Australia) Beverly Rae (3) | (Australia) Lorraine Coghlan Robinson | 6–2, 3–6, 5–5, ret. |
| 1962 | (Australia) Ann Jenkins | (Australia) Beverly Rae | 6–4, 6–4 |
| 1963 | (Australia) Judy Tegart | (Australia) Beverly Rae | 6–4, 6–1 |
| 1964 | (Australia) Judy Tegart (2) | (Australia) Beverly Rae | 6–2, 6–3 |
| 1965 | (Australia) Judy Tegart (3) | (Australia) Kerry Melville | 6–4, 3–6, 6–4 |
| 1966 | (Australia) Pat Turner | (Australia) Judy Tegart | w.o. |
| 1967 | (Australia) Lesley Turner | (Australia) Beryl Jenkins | 6–3, 6–0 |
| 1968 | (Australia) Beverly Rae (4) | (Australia) Lynette Mansfield | 6–2, 6–1 |
↓ Open Era ↓
| 1969 | (Australia) Beryl Jenkins | (Australia) Janet Young | 1–6, 6–4, 6–3 |
| 1970 | (Australia) Beverly Rae (5) | (Australia) Janine Whyte | 0–6, 6–2, 6–4 |
| 1971 | (Australia) Janine Whyte | (Australia) Beverly Rae | 4–6, 6–1, 6–2 |
| 1972 | (Australia) Janet Young | (Australia) Maureen Pratt | 6–3, 6–3 |
| 1973 | (Australia) Judy Tegart-Dalton (4) | (Australia) Maureen Pratt | 6–1, 6–1 |
| 1974 | (Australia) Kerry Harris | (Australia) Janet Young | 6–2, 6–2 |
| 1975 | (Australia) Kym Ruddell | (Australia) Pam Whytcross | 6–1, 6–0 |
| 1976 | (Australia) Kym Ruddell (2) | (Australia) Pam Whytcross | 6–7, 6–4, 6–2 |
| 1977 | (Australia) Gwen Stirton | (Australia) Sue Chancellor | 6–4, 6–2 |
| 1978 | (Australia) Elizabeth Little | (Australia) Beverly Rae | 7–6, 6–4 |
| 1979 | (Australia) Pam Whytcross | (Australia) Susan Leo | 7–6, 6–3 |

== Tournament records ==
=== Men's singles ===
Included:

- Most titles: (Australia) Will Coghlan (6)
- Most consecutive titles: (Australia) Will Coghlan (3)
- Most finals: (Australia) Will Coghlan (6)
- Most consecutive finals: (Australia) Will Coghlan (3)

=== Women's singles ===
- Most Titles: (Australia) Beverly Rae (5)
- Most Consecutive Titles: (Australia) Judy Tegart (3)
- Most finals: (Australia) Beverly Rae (11)
- Most consecutive finals: (Australia) Beverly Rae & (Australia) Judy Tegart (4)
