= Billie Jean King Cup winning players =

This is a complete list of all players who won the Billie Jean King Cup, an international team event in women's tennis:

Player	Total	Years
(United States) Chris Evert	8	1977, 1978, 1979, 1980, 1981, 1982, 1986, 1989
(United States) Billie Jean King	7	1963, 1966, 1967, 1976, 1977, 1978, 1979
(United States) Rosemary Casals	7	1970, 1976, 1977, 1978, 1979, 1980, 1981
(Czech Republic) Petra Kvitová	6	2011, 2012, 2014, 2015, 2016, 2018
(Czech Republic) Barbora Strýcová	6	2011, 2012, 2014, 2015, 2016, 2018
(Spain) Arantxa Sánchez Vicario	5	1991, 1993, 1994, 1995, 1998
(Spain) Conchita Martínez	5	1991, 1993, 1994, 1995, 1998
(Italy) Sara Errani	5	2009, 2010, 2013, 2024, 2025
(Czech Republic) Lucie Hradecká	5	2011, 2012, 2014, 2015, 2016
(Czech Republic) Lucie Šafářová	5	2011, 2012, 2014, 2015, 2016
(Australia) Margaret Court	4	1964, 1965, 1968, 1971
(Czech Republic) Helena Suková	4	1983, 1984, 1985, 1988
(Czech Republic) Hana Mandlíková	4	1983, 1984, 1985, 1988
(Czech Republic) (United States) Martina Navratilova	4	1975, 1982, 1986, 1989
(Spain) Vivi Ruano	4	1993, 1994, 1995, 1998
(Italy) Flavia Pennetta	4	2006, 2009, 2010, 2013
(Italy) Roberta Vinci	4	2006, 2009, 2010, 2013
(United States) Julie Heldman	3	1964, 1966, 1969
(Australia) Evonne Goolagong	3	1971, 1973, 1974
(United States) Tracy Austin	3	1978, 1979, 1980
(United States) Zina Garrison	3	1986, 1989, 1990
(United States) Jennifer Capriati	3	1990, 1996, 2000
(United States) Monica Seles	3	1996, 1999, 2000
(United States) Lindsay Davenport	3	1996, 1999, 2000
(Russia) Svetlana Kuznetsova	3	2004, 2007, 2008
(Italy) Francesca Schiavone	3	2006, 2009, 2010
(Czech Republic) Karolína Plíšková	3	2015, 2016, 2018
(United States) Carole Graebner	2	1963, 1966
(Australia) Lesley Turner	2	1964, 1965
(Australia) Judy Tegart	2	1965, 1970
(Australia) Janet Young	2	1973, 1974
(United States) Kathy Jordan	2	1980, 1981
(Czech Republic) Iva Budařová	2	1983, 1984
(Czech Republic) Marcela Skuherská	2	1983, 1984
(United States) Pam Shriver	2	1986, 1989
(Germany) Steffi Graf	2	1987, 1992
(United States) Gigi Fernández	2	1990, 1996
(France) Mary Pierce	2	1997, 2003
(Russia) Anastasia Myskina	2	2004, 2005
(Russia) Vera Zvonareva	2	2004, 2008
(Russia) Anna Chakvetadze	2	2007, 2008
(Russia) Elena Vesnina	2	2007, 2008
(Czech Republic) Andrea Hlaváčková	2	2012, 2014
(Italy) Jasmine Paolini	2	2024, 2025
(Italy) Lucia Bronzetti	2	2024, 2025
(Italy) Elisabetta Cocciaretto	2	2024, 2025
(Czech Republic) Kateřina Siniaková	2	2018, 2026
(United States) Darlene Hard	1	1963
(Australia) Robyn Ebbern	1	1964
(Australia) Kerry Melville	1	1968
(United States) Nancy Richey	1	1969
(United States) Jane Bartkowicz	1	1969
(Australia) Karen Krantzcke	1	1970
(Australia) Lesley Hunt	1	1971
(South Africa) Brenda Kirk	1	1972
(South Africa) Greta Delport	1	1972
(South Africa) Pat Walkden	1	1972
(Australia) Patricia Coleman	1	1973
(Australia) Dianne Fromholtz	1	1974
(Czech Republic) Renáta Tomanová	1	1975
(United States) Andrea Jaeger	1	1981
(Czech Republic) Regina Maršíková	1	1985
(Czech Republic) Andrea Holíková	1	1985
(Germany) Bettina Bunge	1	1987
(Germany) Claudia Kohde-Kilsch	1	1987
(Germany) Silke Meier	1	1987
(Czech Republic) Jana Novotná	1	1988
(Czech Republic) Jana Pospíšilová	1	1988
(Czech Republic) Radka Zrubáková	1	1988
(United States) Patty Fendick	1	1990
(Germany) Anke Huber	1	1992
(Germany) Barbara Rittner	1	1992
(Germany) Sabine Hack	1	1992
(Spain) Cristina Torrens	1	1993
(Spain) Ángeles Montolio	1	1994
(Spain) Neus Ávila	1	1995
(Spain) María Sánchez Lorenzo	1	1995
(United States) Linda Wild	1	1996
(United States) Mary Joe Fernández	1	1996
(France) Alexandra Fusai	1	1997
(France) Anne-Gaëlle Sidot	1	1997
(France) Nathalie Tauziat	1	1997
(France) Sandrine Testud	1	1997
(Spain) Magüi Serna	1	1998
(United States) Chanda Rubin	1	1999
(United States) Serena Williams	1	1999
(United States) Venus Williams	1	1999
(United States) Lisa Raymond	1	2000
(Belgium) Els Callens	1	2001
(Belgium) Laurence Courtois	1	2001
(Belgium) Justine Henin	1	2001
(Belgium) Kim Clijsters	1	2001
(Slovakia) Daniela Hantuchová	1	2002
(Slovakia) Henrieta Nagyová	1	2002
(Slovakia) Janette Husárová	1	2002
(Slovakia) Martina Suchá	1	2002
(France) Amélie Mauresmo	1	2003
(France) Émilie Loit	1	2003
(France) Nathalie Dechy	1	2003
(France) Stéphanie Cohen-Aloro	1	2003
(France) Virginie Razzano	1	2003
(Russia) Elena Likhovtseva	1	2004
(Russia) Dinara Safina	1	2005
(Russia) Elena Bovina	1	2005
(Russia) Elena Dementieva	1	2005
(Russia) Vera Dushevina	1	2005
(Italy) Mara Santangelo	1	2006
(Italy) Romina Oprandi	1	2006
(Russia) Nadia Petrova	1	2007
(Russia) Ekaterina Makarova	1	2008
(Czech Republic) Květa Peschke	1	2011
(Italy) Karin Knapp	1	2013
(United States) Alison Riske	1	2017
(United States) Bethanie Mattek-Sands	1	2017
(United States) CoCo Vandeweghe	1	2017
(United States) Lauren Davis	1	2017
(United States) Shelby Rogers	1	2017
(United States) Sloane Stephens	1	2017
(Czech Republic) Barbora Krejčíková	1	2018
(France) Alizé Cornet	1	2019
(France) Caroline Garcia	1	2019
(France) Fiona Ferro	1	2019
(France) Kristina Mladenovic	1	2019
(France) Pauline Parmentier	1	2019
(Russia) Daria Kasatkina	1	2021
(Russia) Ekaterina Alexandrova	1	2021
(Russia) Liudmila Samsonova	1	2021
(Switzerland) Belinda Bencic	1	2022
(Switzerland) Viktorija Golubic	1	2022
(Switzerland) Jil Teichmann	1	2022
(Switzerland) Simona Waltert	1	2022
(Canada) Eugenie Bouchard	1	2023
(Canada) Gabriela Dabrowski	1	2023
(Canada) Leylah Fernandez	1	2023
(Canada) Marina Stakusic	1	2023
(Italy) Martina Trevisan	1	2024
(Italy) Tyra Caterina Grant	1	2025
(Czech Republic) Linda Nosková	1	2026
(Czech Republic) Karolína Muchová	1	2026
(Czech Republic) Marie Bouzková	1	2026
(Czech Republic) Sára Bejlek	1	2026
