= 1968 US Open (tennis) =

- Date: 29 August – 8 September
- Edition: 88th
- Category: Grand Slam (ITF)
- Prize money: $100,000
- Surface: Grass
- Location: Forest Hills, Queens; New York City, New York
- Venue: West Side Tennis Club

Champions

Men's singles
- (United States) Arthur Ashe

Women's singles
- (United Kingdom) Virginia Wade

Men's doubles
- (United States) Robert Lutz / (United States) Stan Smith

Women's doubles
- (Brazil) Maria Bueno / (Australia) Margaret Court

Mixed doubles
- (United States) Mary-Ann Eisel / (United Kingdom) Peter Curtis
- US Open

The 1968 US Open (formerly known as U.S. National Championships) was a tennis tournament that took place on the outdoor grass courts at the West Side Tennis Club, Forest Hills in New York City, New York. The tournament ran from 29 August until 8 September. It was the 88th staging of the tournament and the fourth Grand Slam event of 1968. It was the first edition of the tournament in the Open Era of tennis and as such for the first time offered prize money, totaling $100,000.

Arthur Ashe and Virginia Wade won the singles titles, with Ashe becoming the first black man to win the US Open. Ashe was still registered as an amateur and therefore not entitled to the $14,000 first-prize money, which instead went to runner-up Tom Okker, while Wade earned $6,000. Frank Parker, at the age of 52, lost to eventual champion Arthur Ashe in the second round, and still holds the record for the oldest man to compete in a Grand Slam singles tournament.

Journalist John McPhee wrote a book, Levels of the Game (1969), that covered the semifinal match between Ashe and Clark Graebner.

== Finals ==
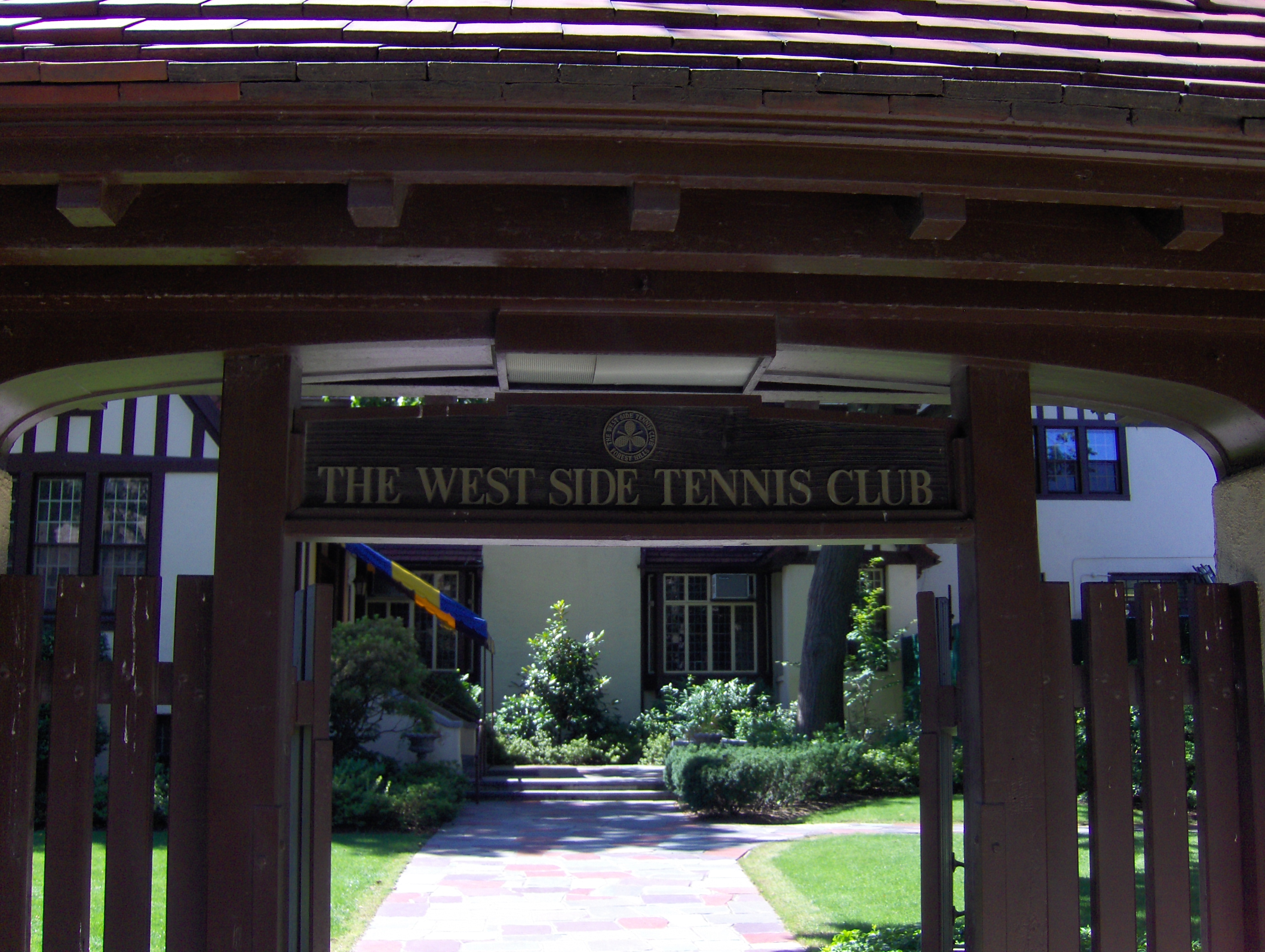
West Side Tennis Club, Queens

=== Men's singles ===
(United States) Arthur Ashe defeated (Netherlands) Tom Okker, 14–12, 5–7, 6–3, 3–6, 6–3

• It was Ashe's 1st career Grand Slam singles title and his 1st and only at the US Open.

=== Women's singles ===
(United Kingdom) Virginia Wade defeated (United States) Billie Jean King, 6–4, 6–2

• It was Wade's 1st career Grand Slam singles title and her 1st and only at the US Open.

=== Men's doubles ===
(United States) Bob Lutz / (United States) Stan Smith defeated (United States) Arthur Ashe / (Spain) Andrés Gimeno, 11–9, 6–1, 7–5

• It was Lutz's 1st career Grand Slam doubles title.
• It was Smith's 1st career Grand Slam doubles title.

=== Women's doubles ===
(Brazil) Maria Bueno / (Australia) Margaret Court defeated (United States) Rosemary Casals / (United States) Billie Jean King, 4–6, 9–7, 8–6

• It was Bueno's 11th and last career Grand Slam doubles title and her 4th at the US Open.
• It was Court's 10th career Grand Slam doubles title and her 2nd at the US Open.

=== Mixed doubles ===
No mixed doubles event was held at the 1968 US Open. Results often listed are those of the 1968 U.S. National Championships held a month earlier in Boston.
(United States) Mary-Ann Eisel / (United Kingdom) Peter Curtis defeated (United States) Tory Fretz / (United States) Gerry Perry 6–4, 7–5

Preceded by 1968 Wimbledon Championships	Grand Slams	Succeeded by 1969 Australian Open
