= Kenneth Andersson =

Kenneth Andersson may refer to:

- Kennet Andersson (born 1967), Swedish footballer
- Kenneth Andersson (tennis) (born 1945), Swedish tennis player
