= Glenn Grisillo =

South African tennis player

- Country (sports): South Africa
- Born: 16 July 1946 (age 80)
- Died: 15 May 2023 Reno, Nevada

Grand Slam singles results
- Wimbledon: Q1 (1978)

Grand Slam mixed doubles results
- Wimbledon: 3R (1966)

Glenn Grisillo (born 25 July 1946) is a former tennis player from South Africa.

Grisillo, a Reno resident originally from Johannesburg, featured twice in the mixed doubles main draw at Wimbledon, including in 1966 when he made the third round with partner Cora Schediwy. He played collegiate tennis for Mississippi State University on a scholarship, later transferring to the University of Nevada. In 1971, for a charity event, he set a record with his cousin Mel Baleson of playing continuous tennis for 73 hours and 25 minutes. Unofficially, the two played a total of 2,224 games. It was listed in the Guinness Book of World Records.
