= 1966 Wimbledon Championships – Boys' singles =

Boys' singles
- 1966 Wimbledon Championships

Final
- Champion: (Soviet Union) Vladimir Korotkov
- Runner-up: (New Zealand) Brian Fairlie
- Score: 6–3, 11–9

Events
Singles	men	women		boys	girls
Doubles	men	women	mixed	boys	girls
← 1965 ·	Wimbledon Championships	· 1967 →

Vladimir Korotkov successfully defended his title, defeating Brian Fairlie in the final, 6–3, 11–9 to win the boys' singles tennis title at the 1966 Wimbledon Championships.

== Draw ==
=== Key ===
- Q = Qualifier
- WC = Wild card
- LL = Lucky loser
- Alt = Alternate
- SE = Special exempt
- PR = Protected ranking
- ITF = ITF entry
- JE = Junior exempt
- w/o = Walkover
- r = Retired
- d = Defaulted
- SR = Special ranking

=== Finals ===
Semifinals
(Soviet Union) Vladimir Korotkov	6	6
(Brazil) Reno Figueiredo	0	3
(Spain) Manuel Orantes	6	8	2
(New Zealand) Brian Fairlie	4	10	6

Final
(Soviet Union) Vladimir Korotkov	6	11
(New Zealand) Brian Fairlie	3	9

=== Top half ===
First round
(Czechoslovakia) Pavel Huťka	6	6
(Argentina) A Grimaldi	0	1
(Uganda) A Mitha	2	7
(Poland) K Juchnicki	6	9
(Brazil) Reno Figueiredo	7	6
(Republic of Ireland) Desmond Early	5	1
(South Vietnam) G Hoi Bon Hoa	4	6
(Austria) Hans Kary	6	8

Second round
(West Germany) Jürgen Faßbender	6	6
(Greece) Nicolas Kelaidis	1	1
(Soviet Union) Vladimir Korotkov	6	6
(Switzerland) W Allemann	1	2
(Czechoslovakia) P Huťka	6	6
(Poland) K Juchnicki	1	3
(Brazil) R Figueiredo	6	7
(Austria) H Kary	2	5

Quarterfinals
(West Germany) J Faßbender	2	5
(Soviet Union) V Korotkov	6	7
(Czechoslovakia) P Huťka	3	3
(Brazil) R Figueiredo	6	6

Semifinals
(Soviet Union) V Korotkov	6	6
(Brazil) R Figueiredo	0	3

=== Bottom half ===
First round
(Spain) Manuel Orantes	6	6
(Netherlands) Nanno Kranenborg	1	0
(Denmark) P Uldall	3	1
(Belgium) Marc Bolle	6	6
(United Kingdom) John de Mendoza	6	6
(Norway) OJ Østberg	0	1

Second round
(Spain) M Orantes	6	6
(Belgium) M Bolle	0	4
(United Kingdom) J de Mendoza	6	6
(Dominion of Ceylon) Nihal Fernando	4	1
(France) Philippe Iemetti	1	4
(New Zealand) Brian Fairlie	6	6
(Sweden) Roger Bernow	3	4
(India) Balaram Singh	6	6

Quarterfinals
(Spain) M Orantes	6	6
(United Kingdom) J de Mendoza	3	2
(New Zealand) B Fairlie	6	6
(India) B Singh	4	3

Semifinals
(Spain) M Orantes	6	8	2
(New Zealand) B Fairlie	4	10	6
