= Kenneth Andersson (tennis) =

Swedish tennis player (born 1945)

- Country (sports): Sweden
- Born: 27 March 1945 (age 81)
- Turned pro: 1961(amateur tour)
- Retired: 1974
- Plays: Right–handed

Singles
- Career record: 1–8

Grand Slam singles results
- Australian Open: 2R (1967)
- French Open: 1R (1967)
- Wimbledon: 1R (1964)

Doubles
- Career record: 0–3

Grand Slam doubles results
- Australian Open: 2R (1967)
- Wimbledon: 1R (1964)

Mixed doubles

Grand Slam mixed doubles results
- Australian Open: QF (1967)
- French Open: 1R (1966)
- Wimbledon: 2R (1965)

Kenneth Andersson (born 27 March 1945) is a former Swedish tennis player who was active in the 1960s.

== Tennis career ==
Andersson competed on the amateur circuit during the 1960s and had some success during 1964 when he reached the semi-finals at the Scandinavian Indoor Championships in Copenhagen, before losing to Jørgen Ulrich and the semi-finals at the Knokke Le Zoute tournament, held in Knokke-Heist, Belgium, where he lost to Giordano Majoli of Italy. He also qualified for his first Grand Slam tournament when he made the main draw, as a lucky loser at Wimbledon.

Andersson's best results at a Grand Slam tournament were at the 1967 Australian Open where reached the second round in both singles and doubles and in partnership with Kay Rosser, reached the quarterfinals of the mixed doubles event. In 1968 he won the men's doubles title, with Ove Bengtson, at the Scandinavian Indoor Championships. His final appearance in the main draw of a singles event was in 1972 at the Stockholm Open where, after receiving a bye in the first round, he lost to Ilie Năstase in the second round.
