= 1967 Wimbledon Championships – Boys' singles =

Boys' singles
- 1967 Wimbledon Championships

Final
- Champion: (Spain) Manuel Orantes
- Runner-up: (United States) Mike Estep
- Score: 6–2, 6–0

Events
Singles	men	women		boys	girls
Doubles	men	women	mixed	boys	girls
← 1966 ·	Wimbledon Championships	· 1968 →

Manuel Orantes defeated Mike Estep in the final, 6–2, 6–0 to win the boys' singles tennis title at the 1967 Wimbledon Championships.

== Draw ==
=== Key ===
- Q = Qualifier
- WC = Wild card
- LL = Lucky loser
- Alt = Alternate
- SE = Special exempt
- PR = Protected ranking
- ITF = ITF entry
- JE = Junior exempt
- w/o = Walkover
- r = Retired
- d = Defaulted
- SR = Special ranking

=== Finals ===
Semifinals
(Czechoslovakia) Pavel Huťka	3	6	2
(United States) Mike Estep	6	3	6
(United Kingdom) John de Mendoza	0	6
(Spain) Manuel Orantes	6	8

Final
(United States) Mike Estep	2	0
(Spain) Manuel Orantes	6	6

=== Top half ===
First round
(Sudan) AT Farid	1	1
(South Africa) Mervyn Webster	6	6
(Italy) Mario Caimo	9	3
(Czechoslovakia) Pavel Huťka	11	6
(Sweden) Hans Fredrik Nordström	6	6
(Republic of Ireland) James McArdle	1	2
(Pakistan) Haroon Rahim	6	6
(Austria) Hans Kary	2	1
(Monaco) P Crovetto	3	1
(Chile) Hans Gildemeister	6	6
(United Arab Republic) Ali Fathi El Daoudi	w/o
(United States) Mike Estep

Second round
(Iran) Mohammad Hossein Akbari	0	2
(Argentina) Tito Vázquez	6	6
(South Africa) M Webster	3	4
(Czechoslovakia) P Huťka	6	6
(Sweden) HF Nordström	7	6	1
(Pakistan) H Rahim	9	3	6
(Chile) H Gildemeister	2	1
(United States) M Estep	6	6

Quarterfinals
(Argentina) T Vázquez	3	9
(Czechoslovakia) P Huťka	6	11
(Pakistan) H Rahim	7	6	4
(United States) M Estep	5	8	6

Semifinals
(Czechoslovakia) P Huťka	3	6	2
(United States) M Estep	6	3	6

=== Bottom half ===
First round
(Netherlands) Fred Hemmes	6	6
(India) Anand Amritraj	1	2
(Belgium) Marc Bolle	5	2
(United Kingdom) John de Mendoza	7	6
(Denmark) Tom Christensen	6	6
(Poland) Witold Meres	2	4
(Switzerland) Jacques Michod	2	4
(Brazil) Luis Felipe Tavares	6	6
(Finland) R Ojala	3	4
(France) Patrick Proisy	6	6

Second round
(Netherlands) F Hemmes	2	3
(United Kingdom) J de Mendoza	6	6
(Denmark) T Christensen	5	2
(Brazil) LF Tavares	7	6
(France) P Proisy	2	3
(Spain) Manuel Orantes	6	6
(Norway) A Sartz-Knudsen	0	3
(West Germany) Karl Meiler	6	6

Quarterfinals
(United Kingdom) J de Mendoza	6	6
(Brazil) LF Tavares	3	4
(Spain) M Orantes	6	6
(West Germany) K Meiler	2	2

Semifinals
(United Kingdom) J de Mendoza	0	6
(Spain) M Orantes	6	8
