= Greta Delport =

South African tennis player

- Full name: Margarethe Delport
- Country (sports): South Africa
- Born: 29 April 1945 (age 80) Port Elizabeth, South Africa

Singles

Grand Slam singles results
- French Open: 2R (1966, 1967)
- Wimbledon: 3R (1967)

Doubles

Grand Slam doubles results
- French Open: 3R (1966)
- Wimbledon: 1R (1966, 1967)

Grand Slam mixed doubles results
- French Open: 2R (1967)
- Wimbledon: 3R (1966)

Margarethe "Greta" Delport (born 29 April 1945) is a South African former tennis player.

Born in Port Elizabeth, Delport was most active in the 1960s and her career included a singles third round appearance at the 1967 Wimbledon Championships. She participated in South Africa's winning 1972 Federation Cup campaign.

== See also ==
- List of South Africa Fed Cup team representatives
