= Sandra Walsham =

Australian tennis player

- Full name: Sandra Walsham Reid
- Country (sports): Australia

Singles

Grand Slam singles results
- Australian Open: 2R (1966, 1967, 1970)
- Wimbledon: 1R (1970)

Doubles

Grand Slam doubles results
- Australian Open: SF (1967)
- Wimbledon: 1R (1970)

Sandra Walsham Reid is an Australian former professional tennis player.

Walsham was a women's doubles semi-finalist at the 1967 Australian Championships and qualified for the singles main draw of the 1970 Wimbledon Championships. She took over the Matraville Sports Centre with husband Bob Reid in 1988. Their children, Renee Reid and Todd Reid, were both professional tennis players.
