= 1966 Wimbledon Championships – Girls' singles =

Girls' singles
- 1966 Wimbledon Championships

Final
- Champion: (Finland) Birgitta Lindström
- Runner-up: (United Kingdom) Judy Congdon
- Score: 7–5, 6–3

Details
- Draw: 18

Events
Singles	men	women		boys	girls
Doubles	men	women	mixed	boys	girls
← 1965 ·	Wimbledon Championships	· 1967 →

Birgitta Lindström defeated Judy Congdon in the final, 7–5, 6–3 to win the girls' singles tennis title at the 1966 Wimbledon Championships.

== Draw ==
=== Key ===
- Q = Qualifier
- WC = Wild card
- LL = Lucky loser
- Alt = Alternate
- SE = Special exempt
- PR = Protected ranking
- ITF = ITF entry
- JE = Junior exempt
- w/o = Walkover
- r = Retired
- d = Defaulted
- SR = Special ranking

=== Finals ===
Semifinals
(United Kingdom) Judy Congdon	6	7
(Sweden) Maria Strandberg	4	5
(Finland) Birgitta Lindström	6	3	7
(Soviet Union) Rauza Islanova	1	6	5

Final
(United Kingdom) Judy Congdon	5	3
(Finland) Birgitta Lindström	7	6

=== Top half ===
First round
(Canada) Andrée Martin	1	1
(Sweden) Maria Strandberg	6	6

Second round
(Republic of Ireland) C O'Reilly	3	4
(United Kingdom) Judy Congdon	6	6
(South Africa) Gillian Dove	2	2
(Argentina) Raquel Giscafré	6	6
(Denmark) B Sørensen	2	3
(Austria) G Vyplasil	6	6
(Norway) E Robsahm	3	1
(Sweden) M Strandberg	6	6

Quarterfinals
(United Kingdom) J Congdon	6	7
(Argentina) R Giscafré	3	5
(Austria) G Vyplasil	0	2
(Sweden) M Strandberg	6	6

Semifinals
(United Kingdom) J Congdon	6	7
(Sweden) M Strandberg	4	5

=== Bottom half ===
First round
(Belgium) Ingrid Loeys	7	6
(Hungary) Judit Szörényi	5	2

Second round
(Belgium) I Loeys	2	1
(Finland) Birgitta Lindström	6	6
(France) Marion Cristiani	2	3
(Netherlands) Ada Bakker	6	6
(Poland) Ilona Fudala	4	4
(Soviet Union) Rauza Islanova	6	6
(Switzerland) Evagarth Emmenegger	4	0
(West Germany) Katja Burgemeister	6	6

Quarterfinals
(Finland) B Lindström	6	6
(Netherlands) A Bakker	3	3
(Soviet Union) R Islanova	6	6
(West Germany) K Burgemeister	4	4

Semifinals
(Finland) B Lindström	6	3	7
(Soviet Union) R Islanova	1	6	5
