= Karl Coombes =

Australian tennis coach and player

- Full name: Karl Edward Coombes
- Country (sports): Australia
- Born: 17 December 1947; Sydney, Australia
- Died: 27 October 2017 (aged 69); Naples, Florida, U.S.
- Height: 5 ft 11 in (180 cm)

Singles
- Career record: 4–13
- Highest ranking: No. 162 (17 Jan 1975)

Grand Slam singles results
- Australian Open: 1R (1967, 1970)
- French Open: Q1 (1970)
- Wimbledon: Q1 (1970)
- US Open: 1R (1968)

Doubles

Grand Slam doubles results
- Australian Open: 1R (1967, 1970)
- US Open: 1R (1968)

Karl Edward Coombes (17 December 1947 – 27 October 2017) was an Australian tennis coach and player.

Coombes, born in Sydney, won the boys' singles title at the 1966 Australian Championships. He played four-years of collegiate tennis in the United States for Oklahoma City University. In 1987 and 1988 he coached the Charlotte Heat to back to back World TeamTennis titles, then won again in 1989 with the San Antonio Racquets. He was a personal coach of Johan Kriek. From 1996 to 2016 he was tennis director at the Kensington Country Club in Naples, Florida.
