= Gerry Perry (tennis) =

American tennis player (born 1947)

- Country (sports): United States
- Born: June 1, 1947 (age 79) Springfield, Missouri, U.S.
- Height: 5 ft 6 in (1.68 m)

Singles
- Career record: 1–5

Doubles
- Career record: 0–2

Grand Slam mixed doubles results
- US Open: F (1968)

Gerry Perry Jr. (born June 1, 1947) is an American former tennis player who was a runner-up at the 1968 US Open mixed doubles with Tory Fretz.

== Career ==
In 1968, he partnered Tory Fretz in the mixed doubles at the US Open, and they reached the final, losing in straight sets to Mary-Ann Eisel and Peter Curtis.

In 1989, Perry was inducted into the USTA Missouri Valley Hall of Fame.

== Grand Slam finals ==
=== Mixed doubles (1 runner-up) ===
Result	Year	Championship	Surface	Partner	Opponents	Score
Loss	1968	US Open	Grass	(United States) Tory Fretz	(United States) Mary-Ann Eisel (United Kingdom) Peter Curtis	4–6, 5–7
