= Levels of the Game =

1969 nonfiction book by John McPhee

- Author: John McPhee
- Language: English
- Publisher: Farrar, Straus and Giroux
- Publication date: 1969
- Pages: 164
- ISBN: 0374515263

Levels of the Game is a 1969 creative nonfiction book by John McPhee that covers the 1968 US Open match between Arthur Ashe and Clark Graebner. Nominally about tennis and tennis players, it additionally explores deeper issues of race, class, and politics.

== Summary ==
The book is structured around a description of the semifinal match in the 1968 US Open at Forest Hills, New York, played between Ashe and Graebner. It alternates between sections which describe the match, and profiles of the two contestants, who had come to tennis from completely different environments: Ashe was black, liberal, and had a "carefree, lacksadaisical, forgetful" style, while Graebner was white, conservative, and played "stiff, compact, Republican tennis". Ashe won the match and went on to defeat Tom Okker in the final, becoming the first black man to win the US Open and the only amateur to do so in the Open Era.

== Background ==
The book was initially published as a two-part piece in The New Yorker. It began after McPhee, having done profiles of individuals for ten years and "feeling squeezed in the form", wanted to explore the possibility of a dual profile. He decided on Ashe and Graebner while watching a CBS broadcast of their US Open match, noting their similarities in age and differences in upbringing. After William Shawn, his editor, agreed to pay for a copy of the kinescope recording, McPhee contacted CBS several weeks later, and was told he had called just in time — the tapes had been scheduled to be erased later that day.

With the help of United States Davis Cup team captain Donald Dell, McPhee was granted permission to interview Ashe and Graebner during weeklong preparations for their November 1968 final against India at the Caribe Hilton Hotel in San Juan, Puerto Rico. He brought a movie projector and the four reels of film, separately showing each player footage from their match and writing down their thoughts. McPhee also interviewed Ashe's parents at their home in Richmond, Virginia, and Graebner's parents in Cleveland, Ohio.

== Reception ==
A New York Times reporter, Robert Lipsyte, wrote that it "may be the high point of American sports journalism". On the other hand, in his 1969 review of the book, Wilfrid Sheed, another Times reporter, wrote that "McPhee labors a bit too, to make his case", believing that Ashe and Graebner did not fit neatly into the archetypes McPhee had assigned them, as did Geoff Dyer in 2017.

In a 2014 retrospective for The Guardian, William Fiennes praised "the golden detail rescued in unfussy language", calling the book "an adventure in form and a batch of pleasures caught on the fly". Esquire named it one of the "35 best sports books ever written" in 2023.
