= 1967 Australian Championships – Men's doubles =

Men's doubles
- 1967 Australian Championships
- 1966 Champions: (Australia) Roy Emerson (Australia) Fred Stolle

Final
- Champions: (Australia) John Newcombe (Australia) Tony Roche
- Runners-up: (Australia) William Bowrey (Australia) Owen Davidson
- Score: 3–6, 6–3, 7–5, 6–8, 8–6

Details
- Draw: 28
- Seeds: 8

Events
| Singles | men | women |
| Doubles | men | women |
- Australian Championships

Roy Emerson and Fred Stolle were the defending champions but only Roy Emerson did compete this year.

John Newcombe and Tony Roche won the final 3–6, 6–3, 7–5, 6–8, 8–6 against William Bowrey and Owen Davidson

== Seeds ==
Champion seeds are indicated in bold text while text in italics indicates the round in which those seeds were eliminated. The top two seeded teams received byes into the second round.

1. (Australia) **John Newcombe** / (Australia) **Tony Roche (champions)**
2. (Australia) William Bowrey / (Australia) Owen Davidson (final)
3. (United States) Arthur Ashe / (United States) Cliff Richey (quarterfinals)
4. (Australia) Roy Emerson / (Australia) Warren Jacques (semifinals)
5. (United Kingdom) Mark Cox / (United Kingdom) Graham Stilwell (quarterfinals)
6. (United States) Jim McManus / (United States) Jim Osborne (quarterfinals)
7. (Australia) Will Coghlan / (United States) David Power (semifinals)
8. (Sweden) Kenneth Andersson / (Belgium) Claude De Gronckel (second round)

== Draw ==
Key

- Q = Qualifier
- WC = Wild card
- LL = Lucky loser
- Alt = Alternate
- ITF = ITF entry
- PR = Protected ranking
- SR = Special ranking
- SE = Special exempt
- JE = Junior exempt
- JR = Junior Accelerator Programme entrant
- CO = College Accelerator Programme entrant
- NG = Next Gen Accelerator Program entrant
- w/o = Walkover
- r = Retired
- d = Defaulted

=== Final ===
Final

1
- (Australia) **John Newcombe**
- (Australia) **Tony Roche**
3
**6**
**7**
6
**8**

2
- (Australia) William Bowrey
- (Australia) Owen Davidson
**6**
3
5
**8**
6

=== Top half ===
First round

Second round

Quarterfinals

Semifinals

1
- (Australia) **J Newcombe**
- (Australia) **T Roche**
w.
o.

- (New Zealand) O Parun
- (New Zealand) K Woolcott

1
- (Australia) **J Newcombe**
- (Australia) **T Roche**
**6**
**6**
**6**

- (Australia) **J Cottrill**
- (Australia) **A Stone**
**6**
**6**
**6**

- (Australia) J Cottrill
- (Australia) A Stone
1
3
4

- (Australia) F Bartlett
- (Australia) J Bartlett
2
2
1

- (Australia) **J Cottrill**
- (Australia) **A Stone**
**9**
**6**
**6**

- (Indonesia) A Budiman
- (Australia) R Sherriff
2
5
3

8
- (Sweden) K Andersson
- (Belgium) C De Gronckel
7
4
4

8
- (Sweden) **K Andersson**
- (Belgium) **C De Gronckel**
**6**
**7**
**6**

1
- (Australia) **J Newcombe**
- (Australia) **T Roche**
3
**6**
**10**
**6**

4
- (Australia) **R Emerson**
- (Australia) **W Jacques**
7
**6**
**6**
**6**

4
- (Australia) R Emerson
- (Australia) W Jacques
**6**
3
8
2

- (Australia) K Coombes
- (Australia) P McCumstie
**9**
3
3
2

4
- (Australia) **R Emerson**
- (Australia) **W Jacques**
**6**
**13**
**7**

- (Australia) **J Cooper**
- (Australia) **R Ruffels**
**8**
3
**13**
5
**7**

- (Australia) J Cooper
- (Australia) R Ruffels
4
11
5

- (Belgium) P Hombergen
- (Belgium) A Tielemans
6
**6**
11
**7**
5

4
- (Australia) **R Emerson**
- (Australia) **W Jacques**
5
**7**
**6**
**7**

- (Australia) **M Kenny**
- (Australia) **J Ryan**
**7**
4
5
**6**
**8**

6
- (United States) J McManus
- (United States) J Osborne
**7**
5
3
5

- (Australia) J Alexander
- (Australia) P Doerner
5
**6**
**7**
2
6

- (Australia) M Kenny
- (Australia) J Ryan
4
11
5

- (Australia) I Bidmeade
- (Australia) P Oatey
3
**6**
4
6

6
- (United States) **J McManus**
- (United States) **J Osborne**
**6**
**13**
**7**

6
- (United States) **J McManus**
- (United States) **J Osborne**
**6**
3
**6**
**8**

=== Bottom half ===
First round

Second round

Quarterfinals

Semifinals

7
- (Australia) **W Coghlan**
- (United States) **D Power**
**7**
**7**
3
4
**6**

- (Australia) B Higgins
- (Australia) B White
5
5
**6**
**6**
3

7
- (Australia) **W Coghlan**
- (United States) **D Power**
**6**
1
**6**
10
**11**

- (Australia) K McCullough
- (Australia) A McDonald
4
4
4

(Australia) D Candy
(Australia) B Phillips-Moore
4
**6**
3
**12**
9

**(Australia) D Candy**
**(Australia) B Phillips-Moore**
**6**
**6**
**6**

7
- (Australia) **W Coghlan**
- (United States) **D Power**
**6**
4
4
**6**
**6**

- (Jamaica) **L Lumsden**
- (Jamaica) **R Russell**
1
**6**
4
**8**
**6**

3
- (United States) A Ashe
- (United States) C Richey
3
**6**
**6**
4
3

- (Australia) T Addison
- (Australia) J Brown
**6**
3
**6**
6
2

- (Jamaica) L Lumsden
- (Jamaica) R Russell
3
5
**6**
**6**
7

- (Australia) P McPherson
- (Australia) G Sara
5
4
3

3
- (United States) **A Ashe**
- (United States) **C Richey**
**6**
**7**
4
3
**9**

3
- (United States) **A Ashe**
- (United States) **C Richey**
**7**
**6**
**6**

7
- (Australia) W Coghlan
- (United States) D Power
1
5
3

5
- (United Kingdom) **M Cox**
- (United Kingdom) **G Stilwell**
**6**
**6**
4
**6**

2
- (Australia) **W Bowrey**
- (Australia) **O Davidson**
**6**
**7**
**6**

- (Australia) I Fletcher
- (Australia) G Penberthy
4
1
**6**
0

5
- (United Kingdom) **M Cox**
- (United Kingdom) **G Stilwell**
**6**
**7**
**6**

- (Australia) B Bowman
- (Australia) W Reid
5
**6**
4
2

- (Australia) D Crealy
- (Sweden) B Folke
2
5
4

- (Australia) **D Crealy**
- (Sweden) **B Folke**
**7**
4
**6**
**6**

5
- (United Kingdom) M Cox
- (United Kingdom) G Stilwell
2
7
2

2
- (Australia) **W Bowrey**
- (Australia) **O Davidson**
**6**
**9**
**6**

- (New Zealand) B Fairlie
- (New Zealand) J Mitchell
9
3
6

2
- (Australia) **W Bowrey**
- (Australia) **O Davidson**
**11**
**6**
**8**
