= Peter Curtis (tennis) =

British tennis player

- Country (sports): United Kingdom
- Born: 29 August 1945 (age 81) Woking, England

Singles
- Career record: 24–44
- Career titles: 0

Grand Slam singles results
- Australian Open: 1R (1968)
- French Open: 1R (1967)
- Wimbledon: 3R (1966)
- US Open: 4R (1968)

Doubles
- Career record: 17–32
- Career titles: 0

Grand Slam doubles results
- Australian Open: QF (1968)
- Wimbledon: SF (1967)

Grand Slam mixed doubles results
- Australian Open: QF (1968)
- Wimbledon: 4R (1968)
- US Open: W (1968)

Team competitions
- Davis Cup: F (1969)

Peter Curtis (born 29 August 1945) is a former British professional tennis player. Curtis won one Grand Slam title in mixed doubles with his then-wife Mary Ann Eisel Curtis.

== Grand Slam finals ==
=== Mixed doubles (1 title) ===
Result	Year	Championship	Surface	Partner	Opponents	Score
Win	1968	US Open	Grass	(United States) Mary-Ann Eisel	(United States) Gerry Perry (United States) Tory Fretz	6–4, 7–5

== Career finals ==
=== Doubles (1 runner-up) ===
Result	W/L	Date	Tournament	Surface	Partner	Opponents	Score
Loss	0–1	Feb 1971	Caracas, Venezuela	Clay	(United Kingdom) Gerald Battrick	(Brazil) Thomaz Koch (Brazil) José Edison Mandarino	4–6, 6–3, 7–6, 4–6, 6–7
