= 1967 Australian Championships – Women's singles =

Women's singles
- 1967 Australian Championships

Final
- Champion: (United States) Nancy Richey
- Runner-up: (Australia) Lesley Turner
- Score: 6–1, 6–4

Details
- Draw: 40
- Seeds: 12

Events
| Singles | men | women |
| Doubles | men | women |
- Australian Championships

First-seeded Nancy Richey defeated Lesley Turner 6–1, 6–4 in the final to win the women's singles tennis title at the 1967 Australian Championships. Margaret Smith was the seven-time defending champion but did not participate this year. This was four time champion Evonne Goolagong's major singles debut at age 15.

== Seeds ==
The seeded players are listed below. Nancy Richey is the champion; others show the round in which they were eliminated. Note that the actual seeds were divided into Australians and Foreigners, as was common at the time. So Lesley Turner was #1 Australian seed and Nancy Richey #1 Foreigner seed etc.

1. (United States) Nancy Richey (champion)
2. (Australia) Lesley Turner (finalist)
3. (United States) Rosie Casals (semifinals)
4. (Australia) Kerry Melville (semifinals)
5. (France) Françoise Dürr (quarterfinals)
6. (Australia) Karen Krantzcke (third round)
7. (Netherlands) Betty Stöve (third round)
8. (Australia) Jan Lehane (third round)
9. (Australia) Judy Tegart (second round)
10. (Australia) Gail Sherriff (quarterfinals)
11. (Australia) Lorraine Robinson (quarterfinals)
12. (Australia) Fay Toyne (second round)

== Draw ==
=== Key ===
- Q = Qualifier
- WC = Wild card
- LL = Lucky loser
- r = Retired

=== Finals ===
Quarterfinals
1 | (United States) Nancy Richey | 6 | 1
11 | (Australia) Lorraine Robinson | 3 | 0^{r}
(Australia) Julie Parrott | 1 | 6 | 8
4 | (Australia) Kerry Melville | 6 | 4 | 10
3 | (United States) Rosie Casals | 6 | 6
10 | (Australia) Gail Sherriff | 3 | 3
5 | (France) Françoise Dürr | 1 | 8
2 | (Australia) Lesley Turner | 6 | 10

Semifinals
1 | (United States) Nancy Richey | 6 | 6
4 | (Australia) Kerry Melville | 4 | 1
3 | (United States) Rosie Casals | 6 | 1 | 4
2 | (Australia) Lesley Turner | 4 | 6 | 6

Finals
1 | (United States) Nancy Richey | 6 | 6
2 | (Australia) Lesley Turner | 1 | 4

=== Earlier rounds ===
==== Section 1 ====
First round

Second round
1 | (United States) Richey | 6 | 6
(Australia) Harris | 0 | 2
(Australia) Caulley | 4 | 2
(Australia) Jenkins | 6 | 6
11 | (Australia) Robinson | 4 | 6 | 6
(Australia) Gourlay | 6 | 4 | 3
(France) Terras | 3 | 2
6 | (Australia) Krantzcke | 6 | 6

Third round
1 | (United States) Richey | 6 | 6
(Australia) Jenkins | 3 | 2
11 | (Australia) Robinson | 6 | 4 | 6
6 | (Australia) Krantzcke | 0 | 6 | 4

Quarterfinals
1 | (United States) Richey | 6 | 1
11 | (Australia) Robinson | 3 | 0^{r}

==== Section 2 ====
First round
(Australia) Cooper | 6 | 3 | 6
(Australia) Starr | 4 | 6 | 0
(Australia) Goolagong | 4 | 6 | 6
(Australia) Stephen | 6 | 4 | 2
(Australia) Walsham | 6 | 7
(Uruguay) Bonicelli | 1 | 5
4 | (Australia) Melville | 6 | 6
(Australia) Starr | 3 | 2

Second round
7 | (Netherlands) Stöve | 6 | 6
(Australia) Hunt | 2 | 2
(Australia) Parrott | 3 | 6 | 7
9 | (Australia) Tegart | 6 | 4 | 5
(Australia) Cooper | 2 | 6 | 3
(Australia) Goolagong | 6 | 2 | 6
(Australia) Walsham | 9 | 2
4 | (Australia) Melville | 11 | 6

Third round
7 | (Netherlands) Stöve | 4 | 0
(Australia) Parrott | 6 | 6
(Australia) Goolagong | 0 | 2
4 | (Australia) Melville | 6 | 6

Quarterfinals
(Australia) Parrott | 1 | 6 | 8
4 | (Australia) Melville | 6 | 4 | 10

==== Section 3 ====
First round
3 | (United States) Casals | 6 | 6
(Australia) Hawcroft | 0 | 4
(Netherlands) Venneboer | 6 | 6
(Australia) Dunn | 2 | 4
(Australia) Rosser | 6 | 6
(Australia) James | 3 | 3
(Australia) Fenton | 6 | 6
(Australia) Brand | 1 | 4

Second round
3 | (United States) Casals | 6 | 6
(Netherlands) Venneboer | 2 | 4
(Australia) Rosser | 2 | 0
(Australia) Fenton | 6 | 6
10 | (Australia) Sherriff | 4 | 8 | 6
(Australia) Born | 6 | 6 | 2
(Australia) Alexander | 1 | 6
8 | (Australia) Lehane | 6 | 8

Third round
3 | (United States) Casals | 6 | 6
(Australia) Fenton | 1 | 1
10 | (Australia) Sherriff | 6 | 0 | 6
8 | (Australia) Lehane | 3 | 6 | 2

Quarterfinals
3 | (United States) Casals | 6 | 6
10 | (Australia) Sherriff | 3 | 3

==== Section 4 ====
First round

Second round
5 | (France) Dürr | 6 | 6
(Australia) Nelson | 2 | 1
(Australia) Amos
12 | (Australia) Toyne | w/o
(Australia) Kenny | 6 | 2 | 3
(Australia) Jones | 2 | 6 | 6
(Australia) Batchelor | 1 | 0
2 | (Australia) Turner | 6 | 6

Third round
5 | (France) Dürr | 6 | 6
(Australia) Amos | 0 | 4
(Australia) Jones | 0 | 1
2 | (Australia) Turner | 6 | 6

Quarterfinals
5 | (France) Dürr | 1 | 8
2 | (Australia) Turner | 6 | 10

| Preceded by 1966 U.S. National Championships – Women's singles | Grand Slam women's singles | Succeeded by 1967 French Championships – Women's singles |
