= 1967 Australian Championships – Men's singles =

Men's singles
- 1967 Australian Championships

Final
- Champion: (Australia) Roy Emerson
- Runner-up: (United States) Arthur Ashe
- Score: 6–4, 6–1, 6–4

Details
- Draw: 59
- Seeds: 16

Events
Singles	men	women
Doubles	men	women
- Australian Championships

First-seeded Roy Emerson defeated Arthur Ashe 6–4, 6–1, 6–4 in the final to win the men's singles tennis title at the 1967 Australian Championships. This was his sixth Australian men's singles crown which stood as an all time male record until it was surpassed in 2019 by Novak Djokovic.

== Seeds ==
The seeded players are listed below. Roy Emerson is the champion; others show the round in which they were eliminated.

1. (Australia) Roy Emerson (champion)
2. (United States) Arthur Ashe (finalist)
3. (Australia) John Newcombe (semifinals)
4. (United States) Cliff Richey (quarterfinals)
5. (Australia) Tony Roche (semifinals)
6. (United Kingdom) Mark Cox (quarterfinals)
7. (Australia) Owen Davidson (quarterfinals)
8. (United Kingdom) Graham Stilwell (third round)
9. (Australia) Bill Bowrey (quarterfinals)
10. (United States) Jim McManus (third round)
11. (Australia) Ray Ruffels (third round)
12. (Belgium) Patrick Hombergen (second round)
13. (Australia) Barry Phillips-Moore (third round)
14. (United States) Jim Osborne (third round)
15. (Australia) Will Coghlan (third round)
16. (United States) Dave Power (second round)

== Draw ==
=== Key ===
- Q = Qualifier
- WC = Wild card
- LL = Lucky loser
- r = Retired

=== Finals ===
Quarterfinals
1	(Australia) Roy Emerson	4	6	11	16
9	(Australia) Bill Bowrey	6	4	9	14
5	(Australia) Tony Roche	10	7	4	5	6
4	(United States) Cliff Richey	8	5	6	7	1
3	(Australia) John Newcombe	6	7	6
6	(United Kingdom) Mark Cox	3	5	4
7	(Australia) Owen Davidson	1	3	2
2	(United States) Arthur Ashe	6	6	6

Semifinals
1	(Australia) Roy Emerson	6	4	15	13	6
5	(Australia) Tony Roche	3	6	13	15	2
3	(Australia) John Newcombe	10	22	3	2
2	(United States) Arthur Ashe	12	20	6	6

Final
1	(Australia) Roy Emerson	6	6	6
2	(United States) Arthur Ashe	4	1	4

=== Earlier rounds ===
==== Section 1 ====
First round
(Australia) Blizard	6	6	3	8
(Australia) Bowman	3	4	6	6
14	(United States) Osborne	6	6	7
(Australia) Sherriff	2	3	5
9	(Australia) Bowrey	6	6	4	6
(Australia) White	4	3	6	2
(Australia) Addison	3	6	6	5	6
(Australia) McMillan	6	2	4	7	4
(Australia) Jacques	3	3	6	6	6
(Australia) Penberthy	6	6	1	3	3
8	(United Kingdom) Stilwell	6	6	6
(Australia) Bartlett	4	4	2

Second round
1	(Australia) Emerson	6	7	6
(Australia) Ryan	4	5	2
(Australia) Blizard	5	6	3
14	(United States) Osborne	7	8	6
9	(Australia) Bowrey	6	6	6
(Australia) Addison	3	1	1
(Australia) Jacques	6	3	3
8	(United Kingdom) Stilwell	8	6	6

Third round
1	(Australia) Emerson	8	6	6
14	(United States) Osborne	6	3	4
9	(Australia) Bowrey	6	6	7
8	(United Kingdom) Stilwell	3	2	5

Quarterfinals
1	(Australia) Emerson	4	6	11	16
9	(Australia) Bowrey	6	4	9	14

==== Section 2 ====
First round
5	(Australia) Roche	6	6	6
(Australia) Brown	3	2	3
(New Zealand) Fairlie
(Australia) Richardson	w/o
(Australia) Stone	6	7	6
(Australia) Alexander	3	5	4
16	(Australia) Power	4	6	6	6
(Australia) Pares	6	3	4	4
11	(Australia) Ruffels	6	9	6
(Australia) McCumstie	1	7	4
(Jamaica) Russell	6	10	6
(Australia) A Hammond	3	8	2
(Belgium) Thielemans	7	6	6
(Australia) Candy	5	3	4
4	(United States) Richey	6	6	8
(Australia) Lloyd	2	2	6

Second round
5	(Australia) Roche	9	6	6
(New Zealand) Fairlie	7	0	1
(Australia) Stone	6	1	6	6
16	(Australia) Power	3	6	3	4
11	(Australia) Ruffels	7	6	6
(Jamaica) Russell	5	1	0
(Belgium) Thielemans	w/o
4	(United States) Richey

Third round
5	(Australia) Roche	6	6	6
(Australia) Stone	1	3	2
11	(Australia) Ruffels	6	3	6	7	3
4	(United States) Richey	3	6	4	9	6

Quarterfinals
5	(Australia) Roche	10	7	4	5	6
4	(United States) Richey	8	5	6	7	1

==== Section 3 ====
First round
3	(Australia) Newcombe	6	6	6
(Australia) Coombes	3	2	0
(Australia) Sara	11	6	14	6
(Israel) Stabholz	13	1	12	4
(Australia) Cottrill	6	10	8
(Australia) Smith	3	8	6
12	(Belgium) Hombergen	1	6	6	6
(Indonesia) Aznar	6	3	1	3
13	(Australia) Phillips-Moore	6	6	6
(Australia) Kenny	4	2	3
(Australia) Crealy	6	6	6	3	6
(Sweden) Folke	8	4	4	6	2
(Belgium) De Gronckel	6	10	6	6
(Australia) Dent	2	12	1	1
6	(United Kingdom) Cox	6	7	6
(Australia) Cooper	3	5	3

Second round
3	(Australia) Newcombe
(Australia) Sara	w/o
(Australia) Cottrill	3	7	4	6	4
12	(Belgium) Hombergen	6	5	6	0	0r
13	(Australia) Phillips-Moore	6	6	6	6
(Australia) Crealy	8	4	3	3
(Belgium) De Gronckel	3	1	4
6	(United Kingdom) Cox	6	6	6

Third round
3	(Australia) Newcombe	6	6	7
(Australia) Cottrill	4	4	5
13	(Australia) Phillips-Moore	6	1	4	3
6	(United Kingdom) Cox	4	6	6	6

Quarterfinals
3	(Australia) Newcombe	6	7	6
6	(United Kingdom) Cox	3	5	4

==== Section 4 ====
First round
7	(Australia) Davidson	6	6	6
(Australia) Bidmeade	1	2	3
(Jamaica) Lumsden	6	8	6
(Australia) Reid	4	6	4
(Sweden) Andersson	9	6	6
(Australia) Masters	7	1	2
10	(United States) McManus	6	6	6
(Australia) Johnson	0	1	3
15	(Australia) Coghlan	6	6	2	2	6
(Sweden) Ginman	0	2	6	6	0

Second round
7	(Australia) Davidson	6	6	6
(Jamaica) Lumsden	1	2	3
(Sweden) Andersson	3	1	6	9
10	(United States) McManus	6	6	1	11
15	(Australia) Coghlan	5	6	7	6
(Australia) Higgins	7	3	5	1
(Australia) McPherson	1	3	2
2	(United States) Ashe	6	6	6

Third round
7	(Australia) Davidson	6	6	6
10	(United States) McManus	4	2	3
15	(Australia) Coghlan	1	4
2	(United States) Ashe	6	6

Quarterfinals
7	(Australia) Davidson	1	3	2
2	(United States) Ashe	6	6	6

Preceded by 1966 U.S. National Championships	Grand Slam men's singles	Succeeded by 1967 French Championships
