= 1967 Australian Championships – Women's doubles =

Women's doubles
- 1967 Australian Championships
- 1966 Champions: (Australia) Carole Caldwell Graebner (Australia) Nancy Richey

Final
- Champions: (Australia) Judy Tegart (Australia) Lesley Turner
- Runners-up: (Australia) Lorraine Coghlan (Australia) Évelyne Terras
- Score: 6–0, 6–2

Details
- Draw: 14
- Seeds: 6

Events
Singles	men	women
Doubles	men	women
- Australian Championships

Carole Caldwell Graebner and Nancy Richey were the defending champions but only Nancy Richey did compete this year.

== Seeds ==
Champion seeds are indicated in bold text while text in italics indicates the round in which those seeds were eliminated. The joint top and one team of joint fifth seeded teams received byes into the second round.

1. (Australia) **Judy Tegart** / (Australia) **Lesley Turner (champions)**
2. (United States) Rosemary Casals / (United States) Nancy Richey (quarterfinals)
3. (Australia) Karen Krantzcke / (Australia) Kerry Melville (quarterfinals)
4. (Netherlands) Betty Stöve / (Netherlands) Lidy Venneboer (semifinals)
5. (France) Françoise Dürr / (Australia) Jan Lehane (quarterfinals)
6. (Australia) Lorraine Coghlan / (France) Évelyne Terras (final)

== Draw ==
Key

- Q = Qualifier
- WC = Wild card
- LL = Lucky loser
- Alt = Alternate
- ITF = ITF entry
- PR = Protected ranking
- SR = Special ranking
- SE = Special exempt
- JE = Junior exempt
- JR = Junior Accelerator Programme entrant
- CO = College Accelerator Programme entrant
- NG = Next Gen Accelerator Program entrant
- w/o = Walkover
- r = Retired
- d = Defaulted

=== Final ===
Final

1
- (Australia) **Judy Tegart**
- (Australia) **Lesley Turner**
**6**
**6**

6
(Australia) Lorraine Coghlan
(France) Évelyne Terras
0
2

=== Top half ===
First round

Quarterfinals

Semifinals

1
- (Australia) J Tegart
- (Australia) L Turner

Bye
Bye

1
- (Australia) **J Tegart**
- (Australia) **L Turner**
**6**
**6**

- (Australia) J Starr
- (Australia) F Toyne
3
2

- (Australia) S Alexander
- (Australia) C Cooper
2
3

- (Australia) **J Starr**
- (Australia) **F Toyne**
**6**
**6**

1
- (Australia) **J Tegart**
- (Australia) **L Turner**
**6**
**6**

4
- (Netherlands) B Stöve
- (Netherlands) L Venneboer
4
2

5
- (France) **F Dürr**
- (Australia) **J Lehane**
**6**
**6**

- (Australia) P Brand
- (Australia) S Stephen
4
0

5
- (France) F Dürr
- (Australia) J Lehane
**6**
7
6

4
- (Netherlands) **B Stöve**
- (Netherlands) **L Venneboer**
4
**9**
**8**

- (Australia) H Gourlay
- (Australia) G Chanfreau
4
**6**
5

4
- (Netherlands) **B Stöve**
- (Netherlands) **L Venneboer**
**6**
4
**7**

=== Bottom half ===
First round

Quarterfinals

Semifinals

3
- (Australia) **K Krantzcke**
- (Australia) **K Melville**
**6**
**6**

- (Australia) D Batchelor
- (Australia) J Nelson
0
1

3
- (Australia) K Krantzcke
- (Australia) K Melville
6
**6**
4

6
(Australia) **L Coghlan**
(France) **É Terras**
**8**
1
**6**

- (Australia) D Born
- (Australia) K Rosser
1
1

6
(Australia) **L Coghlan**
(France) **É Terras**
**6**
**6**

6
(Australia) **L Coghlan**
(France) **É Terras**
**6**
**6**

- (Australia) E Fenton
- (Australia) S Walsham
4
4

- (Australia) **E Fenton**
- (Australia) **S Walsham**
**6**
3
**6**

- (Australia) H Amos
- (Australia) M Jones
1
**6**
4

- (Australia) **E Fenton**
- (Australia) **S Walsham**
**6**
**6**

2
- (United States) R Casals
- (United States) N Richey
3
3

2
- (United States) R Casals
- (United States) N Richey

Bye
Bye
