= 1966 Wimbledon Championships =

- Date: 20 June – 2 July
- Edition: 80th
- Category: Grand Slam
- Surface: Grass
- Location: Church Road; SW19, Wimbledon, London, United Kingdom
- Venue: All England Lawn Tennis and Croquet Club
- Attendance: 277,205

Champions

Men's singles
- (Spain) Manuel Santana

Women's singles
- (United States) Billie Jean King

Men's doubles
- (Australia) Ken Fletcher / (Australia) John Newcombe

Women's doubles
- (Brazil) Maria Bueno / (United States) Nancy Richey

Mixed doubles
- (Australia) Ken Fletcher / (Australia) Margaret Smith

Boys' singles
- (Soviet Union) Vladimir Korotkov

Girls' singles
- (Finland) Birgitta Lindström
← 1965 ·	Wimbledon Championships	· 1967 →

The 1966 Wimbledon Championships took place on the outdoor grass courts at the All England Lawn Tennis and Croquet Club in Wimbledon, London, United Kingdom. The tournament was held from Monday 20 June until Saturday 2 July 1966. It was the 80th staging of the Wimbledon Championships, and the third Grand Slam tennis event of 1966. Manuel Santana and Billie Jean King won the singles titles.

== Champions ==
=== Seniors ===
==== Men's singles ====
(Spain) Manuel Santana defeated (United States) Dennis Ralston, 6–4, 11–9, 6–4

==== Women's singles ====
(United States) Billie Jean King defeated (Brazil) Maria Bueno, 6–3, 3–6, 6–1

==== Men's doubles ====
(Australia) Ken Fletcher / (Australia) John Newcombe defeated (Australia) Bill Bowrey / (Australia) Owen Davidson, 6–3, 6–4, 3–6, 6–3

==== Women's doubles ====
(Brazil) Maria Bueno / (United States) Nancy Richey defeated (Australia) Margaret Smith / (Australia) Judy Tegart, 6–3, 4–6, 6–4

==== Mixed doubles ====
(Australia) Ken Fletcher / (Australia) Margaret Smith defeated (United States) Dennis Ralston / (United States) Billie Jean King, 4–6, 6–3, 6–3

=== Juniors ===
==== Boys' singles ====
(Soviet Union) Vladimir Korotkov defeated (New Zealand) Brian Fairlie, 6–3, 11–9

==== Girls' singles ====
(Finland) Birgitta Lindström defeated (United Kingdom) Judy Congdon, 7–5, 6–3

Preceded by 1966 French Championships	Grand Slams	Succeeded by 1966 U.S. National Championships
