= David Power (tennis) =

American tennis player (1944–2022)

William David Power (September 12, 1944 – June 15, 2022) was an American tennis player who was born in Chicago, Illinois. He was a two-time All-American tennis player at the Indiana University Bloomington in 1965, 1966, and 1967.

== Life and career ==
Powers made four appearances at the Cincinnati Open, amassing a 15-3 singles record. He won the 1966 singles title, defeating Tom Gorman in the semifinals and William Harris in the final. In 1965, he reached the singles quarterfinals and teamed with John Pickens to win the doubles title.

Power was ranked as high as No. 25 in singles in the United States, and in 1967 he paired with Will Coghlan to reach the semifinals in doubles at the Australian National Championships.

After playing the circuit, Power became a USPTA Master Professional in 1984 and was the head tennis coach at the University of Cincinnati for nine years (1988–1996). He was the founder and owner of Windward Tennis Academy in Alpharetta, Georgia.

Power was later inducted into the Athletic Hall of Fame at Indiana University. He died on June 15, 2022, at the age of 77.
