= Cora Creydt =

German tennis player

Kora Creydt
- Country (sports): West Germany
- Plays: Left-handed

Singles

Grand Slam singles results
- French Open: 2R (1968)
- Wimbledon: 2R (1972)

Doubles

Grand Slam doubles results
- French Open: 1R (1972)
- Wimbledon: 2R (1972)

Grand Slam mixed doubles results
- Wimbledon: 3R (1966)

Kora Creydt is a German former professional tennis player.

A left-handed player from Düsseldorf, Creydt originally competed on tour under her maiden name of Schediwy.

Creydt won through to the second round of the 1968 French Open, where she lost a close match to Anna Dmitrieva, 6–8 in the third set. She also had main draw appearances at Wimbledon and made the mixed doubles third round in 1966.
