= Will Coghlan =

Australian tennis player

- Full name: William Coghlan
- Country (sports): Australia
- Born: 6 March 1941
- Died: 14 April 2023 (aged 82)
- Turned pro: 1969 (ILTF World Circuit from 1958)
- Retired: 1979

Singles
- Career record: 104–75
- Career titles: 23

Grand Slam singles results
- Australian Open: 3R (1961, 1967)
- Wimbledon: 2R (1961)
- US Open: 3R (1960)

Grand Slam doubles results
- Australian Open: SF (1967)

William Coghlan was a former tennis player from Australia. He was active from 1958 to 1979 and won 22 career singles titles. Will died April 14th 2023.

== Biography ==
Coghlan won the junior title at the 1960 Australian Championships.

A Melbourne real estate agent by profession, he made regular appearances at his home grand slam tournament, twice making the third round. He was a semi-final in the men's doubles at the 1967 Australian Championships, partnering David Power of the United States.

He was the younger brother of tennis player Lorraine Coghlan.
