= 1967 French Championships (tennis) =

- Date: 22 May – 3 June 1967
- Edition: 66
- Category: 37th Grand Slam (ITF)
- Surface: Clay
- Location: Paris (XVI^{e}), France
- Venue: Stade Roland Garros

Champions

Men's singles
- (Australia) Roy Emerson

Women's singles
- (France) Françoise Dürr

Men's doubles
- (Australia) John Newcombe / (Australia) Tony Roche

Women's doubles
- (France) Françoise Dürr / (Australia) Gail Sherriff Chanfreau

Mixed doubles
- (United States) Billie Jean King / (Australia) Owen Davidson
- French Championships

The 1967 French Championships (now known as the French Open) was a tennis tournament that took place on the outdoor clay courts at the Stade Roland-Garros in Paris, France. The tournament ran from 22 May until 3 June. It was the 66th staging of the French Championships, and the second major tennis event of 1967. It was also the last French Championships before the start of the Open Era in tennis. Roy Emerson and Françoise Dürr won the singles titles.

== Finals ==
=== Men's singles ===
(Australia) Roy Emerson defeated (Australia) Tony Roche 6–1, 6–4, 2–6, 6–2

=== Women's singles ===
(France) Françoise Dürr defeated (Australia) Lesley Turner 4–6, 6–3, 6–4

=== Men's doubles ===
(Australia) John Newcombe / (Australia) Tony Roche defeated (Australia) Roy Emerson / (Australia) Ken Fletcher 6–3, 9–7, 12–10

=== Women's doubles ===
(France) Françoise Dürr / (Australia) Gail Sherriff defeated (South Africa) Annette Van Zyl / (South Africa) Pat Walkden 6–2, 6–2

=== Mixed doubles ===
(United States) Billie Jean King / (Australia) Owen Davidson defeated (United Kingdom) Ann Haydon-Jones / (Romania) Ion Țiriac 6–3, 6–1

Preceded by 1967 Australian Championships	Grand Slams	Succeeded by 1967 Wimbledon Championships
