= Tory Ann Fretz =

American tennis player

- Country (sports): United States
- Born: August 8, 1942 (age 83) Harrisburg, Pennsylvania, U.S.
- Plays: Right-handed (one-handed backhand)

Grand Slam singles results
- French Open: 2R (1969)
- Wimbledon: 4R (1974)
- US Open: 3R (1966)

Grand Slam doubles results
- French Open: 2R (1969)
- Wimbledon: 2R (1972)
- US Open: 2R (1969)

Tory-Ann Fretz (born August 8, 1942) is a former American amateur and professional tennis player who played in the 1960s and 1970s . She was ranked in the U.S. top ten from 1963 to 1966, and was No. 2 in the doubles rankings in 1965 and 1966.

== Career ==
Fretz grew up in Harrisburg, Pennsylvania and played collegiate tennis at Occidental College in Los Angeles, California. She was coached by Alice Marble. In 1961 she won the singles and doubles titles at the NCAA Intercollegiate Championship.

At the U.S. Nationals, she was doubles semifinalist in 1965, and reached the mixed finals at the U.S. Open in 1968.

She was runner-up to Carole Caldwell Graebner at the 1965 Pacific Southwest Championships. At the Cincinnati Masters, Fretz reached the singles final in 1968 before falling to Linda Tuero. She also reached the doubles final in 1962 at Cincinnati with Carolyn Rogers.

In 1974, she played with Billie Jean King in the World Team Tennis on the Philadelphia Freedoms.

She has been inducted into the Intercollegiate Women's Tennis Hall of Fame in 1999.

== Grand Slam finals ==
=== Mixed doubles (1 runner-up) ===
Result	Year	Championship	Surface	Partner	Opponents	Score
Loss	1968	US Open	Grass	(United States) Gerry Perry	(United States) Mary-Ann Eisel (United Kingdom) Peter Curtis	4–6, 5–7
