= Évelyne Terras =

French tennis player

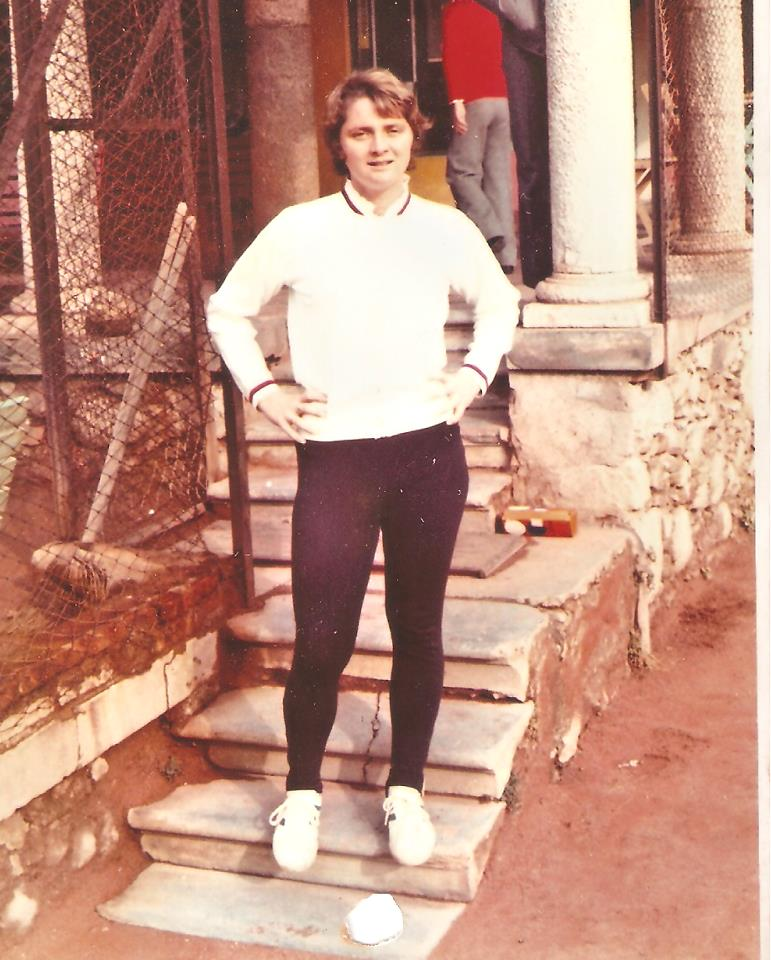
- Full name: Évelyne Terras Papale
- Country (sports): France
- Born: 25 September 1944; Toulon, France
- Died: 24 September 2012 (aged 67)

Singles

Grand Slam singles results
- Australian Open: 2R (1967)
- French Open: 3R (1967)
- Wimbledon: 2R (1967, 1968, 1969, 1970)

Doubles

Grand Slam doubles results
- Australian Open: F (1967)
- French Open: 3R (1969)
- Wimbledon: 2R (1970)

Grand Slam mixed doubles results
- French Open: 2R (1968)
- Wimbledon: 2R (1966, 1967, 1968)

Évelyne Terras (25 September 1944 – 24 September 2012) was a French tennis player who was active in the 1960s and 1970s.

== Career ==
In 1967, she teamed with Lorraine Coghlan in the doubles' event of the Australian Championship, losing the final in straight sets to Lesley Turner Bowrey and Judy Tegart. This made her the first female French player to reach the final of an Australian Open event.

Her best results in a singles' event at a Grand Slam tournament was reaching the third round of the 1967 French Championships, losing to Helga Schultze. She reached the second round of the singles event at the Wimbledon Championships between 1967 and 1970.

In February 1968, she was runner-up to Nell Truman in the singles event of the French Covered Championships in Paris.

Terras was Fed Cup captain of the Italian national team in 1974 and 1975.

== Personal life ==
She married Dino Papale and had one daughter. The couple later divorced. She died on 24 September 2012 of pancreatic cancer.

== Grand Slam finals ==
=== Doubles (1 runner-up ) ===
Result	Year	Championship	Surface	Partner	Opponents	Score
Loss	1967	Australian Championships	Grass	(Australia) Lorraine Coghlan	(Australia) Lesley Turner (Australia) Judy Tegart	0–6, 2–6
