= Mary-Ann Eisel =

American tennis player (born 1946)

Mary–Ann Eisel
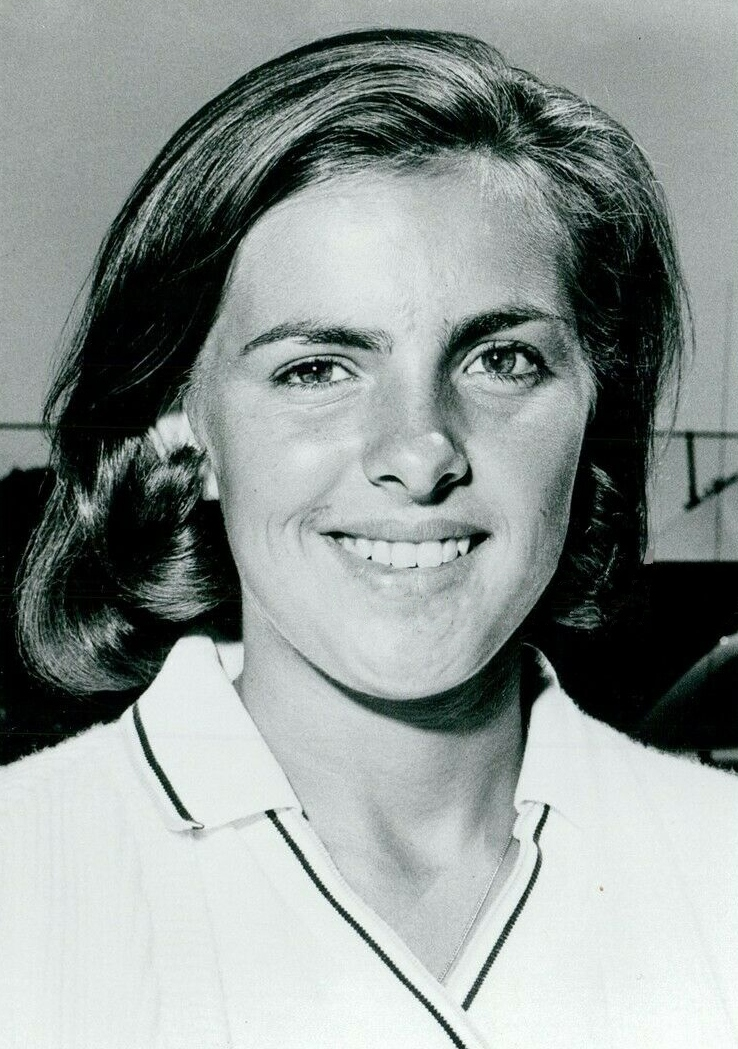
- Eisel in 1968
- Country (sports): United States
- Born: November 25, 1946 (age 79) St. Louis, Missouri, U.S.
- Plays: Right-handed

Singles

Grand Slam singles results
- Australian Open: 3R (1968)
- Wimbledon: QF (1967)
- US Open: 3R (1964, 1965, 1967)

Doubles

Grand Slam doubles results
- Australian Open: QF (1968)
- French Open: QF (1967)
- Wimbledon: SF (1969, 1971)
- US Open: F (1967)

Mixed doubles

Grand Slam mixed doubles results
- Australian Open: QF (1968)
- French Open: 2R (1967)
- Wimbledon: QF (1966)
- US Open: W (1968)

Mary–Ann Eisel (born November 25, 1946) also known as Mary–Ann Curtis or Mary–Ann Beattie is an American former tennis player. She was the US Open mixed doubles champion in 1968.

== Personal life ==
Eisel was born in St. Louis, Missouri, was educated in the Ladue School District, and went on to Washington University in St. Louis, where she competed on the men's tennis team. In 1969, she married fellow tennis player Peter Curtis. Following their divorce, she married Don Beattie on May 12, 1972.

In addition to her tennis career, Eisel was an amateur golfer.

== Career ==
In 1964, Eisel won the US girls' 18 championship. In the same year, she won the Irish National doubles title with Justina Bricka.

Eisel reached the finals of the 1967 women's doubles U.S. National Championships at Forrest Hills with Donna Floyd, losing in three sets against Rosemary Casals and Billie Jean King.

In 1968, she won the US Open mixed doubles with Peter Curtis, defeating Tory Fretz and Gerry Perry in straight sets In 1969, she won the singles title at the Surrey Grass Court Championships, defeating Judy Tegart in three sets. She won the doubles title at the 1971 British Hard Court Championships with Françoise Dürr, defeating Margaret Court and Evonne Goolagong in the final.

In 1968 and 1970, she played for the US Federation Cup team, reaching the semifinals of the World Group on both occasions, and compiled a record of five wins and four losses.

In 1974, she was a team member of the Detroit Loves, which won the Central Section Championship in the inaugural season of the World Team Tennis league in the United States. In 1975, she played for the Hawaii Leis.

In total, she competed at Wimbledon nine times.

== Grand Slam finals ==
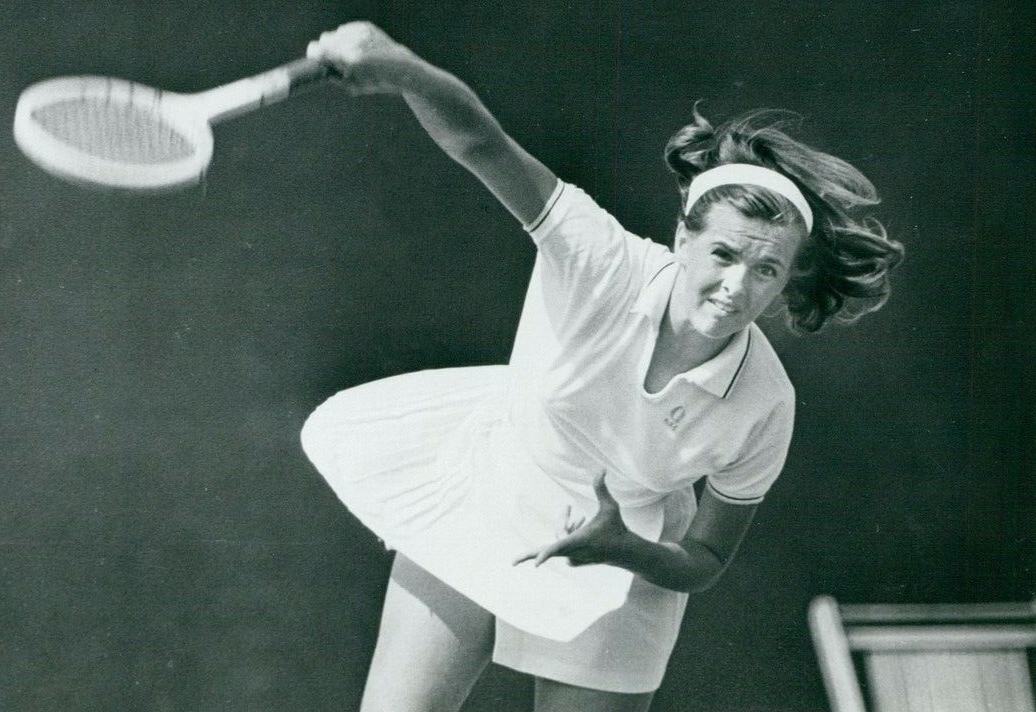
Eisel in 1968

=== Doubles (1 runner-up) ===
Result	Year	Championship	Surface	Partner	Opponents	Score
Loss	1967	U.S. Championships	Grass	(United States) Donna Floyd	(United States) Rosemary Casals (United States) Billie Jean King	6–4, 3–6, 4–6

=== Mixed doubles (1 title) ===
Result	Year	Championship	Surface	Partner	Opponents	Score
Win	1968	US Open	Grass	(United Kingdom) Peter Curtis	(United States) Tory Fretz (United States) Gerry Perry	6–4, 7–5
