= 1967 Australian Championships =

- Date: 20–30 January 1967
- Edition: 55th
- Category: Grand Slam (ITF)
- Surface: Grass
- Location: Adelaide, Australia
- Venue: Memorial Drive

Champions

Men's singles
- (Australia) Roy Emerson

Women's singles
- (United States) Nancy Richey

Men's doubles
- (Australia) John Newcombe / (Australia) Tony Roche

Women's doubles
- (Australia) Lesley Turner / (Australia) Judy Tegart Dalton

Mixed doubles
- (Australia) Lesley Turner / (Australia) Owen Davidson
- Australian Championships

The 1967 Australian Championships was a tennis tournament that took place on outdoor Grass courts at the Memorial Drive, Adelaide, Australia from 20 to 30 January. It was the 55th edition of the Australian Championships (now known as Australian Open), the 14th and last one held in Adelaide and the first Grand Slam tournament of the year. The singles titles were won by Australian Roy Emerson and American Nancy Richey.

== Seniors champions ==
=== Men's singles ===
(Australia) Roy Emerson defeated (United States) Arthur Ashe 6–4, 6–1, 6–4

=== Women's singles ===
(United States) Nancy Richey defeated (Australia) Lesley Turner 6–1, 6–4

=== Men's doubles ===
(Australia) John Newcombe / (Australia) Tony Roche defeated (Australia) Bill Bowrey / (Australia) Owen Davidson 3–6, 6–3, 7–5, 6–8, 8–6

=== Women's doubles ===
(Australia) Judy Tegart / (Australia) Lesley Turner defeated (Australia) Lorraine Robinson / (France) Évelyne Terras, 6–0, 6–2

=== Mixed doubles ===
(Australia) Owen Davidson / (Australia) Lesley Turner defeated (Australia) Tony Roche / (Australia) Judy Tegart, 9–7, 6–4

Preceded by 1966 U.S. National Championships	Grand Slams	Succeeded by 1967 French Championships
