= 2021 Hamburg European Open – Women's doubles =

Women's doubles
- 2021 Hamburg European Open

Final
- Champions: (Italy) Jasmine Paolini (Switzerland) Jil Teichmann
- Runners-up: (Australia) Astra Sharma (Netherlands) Rosalie van der Hoek
- Score: 6–0, 6–4

Details
- Draw: 16
- Seeds: 4

Events
| Singles | men | women |
| Doubles | men | women |
- Hamburg European Open

Martina Hingis and Barbara Schett were the defending champions, having won the previous edition in 2002, however both players have since retired from professional tennis.

Jasmine Paolini and Jil Teichmann won the title, defeating Astra Sharma and Rosalie van der Hoek in the final, 6–0, 6–4.

== Seeds ==
The top seed received a bye into the second round.

1. (Belarus) Lidziya Marozava / (Czech Republic) Renata Voráčová (quarterfinals)
2. (France) Elixane Lechemia / (United States) Ingrid Neel (first round)
3. (Germany) Vivian Heisen / (Poland) Alicja Rosolska (quarterfinals)
4. (Japan) Miyu Kato / (Poland) Katarzyna Piter (first round)

== Draw ==
Key

- Q = Qualifier
- WC = Wild card
- LL = Lucky loser
- Alt = Alternate
- ITF = ITF entry
- PR = Protected ranking
- SR = Special ranking
- SE = Special exempt
- JE = Junior exempt
- JR = Junior Accelerator Programme entrant
- CO = College Accelerator Programme entrant
- NG = Next Gen Accelerator Program entrant
- w/o = Walkover
- r = Retired
- d = Defaulted

=== Draw ===
First round
(Russia) A Fomina (Russia) M Melnikova | 3 | 4
(Russia) A Panova (Germany) J Wachaczyk | 6 | 6
4 | (Japan) M Kato (Poland) K Piter | 3 | 2
(Germany) T Korpatsch (Germany) A Zaja | 6 | 6
(Italy) J Paolini (Switzerland) J Teichmann | 6 | 6
(Russia) N Dzalamidze (Bulgaria) I Shinikova | 0 | 3
(Australia) A Sharma (Netherlands) R van der Hoek | 6 | 6
(Germany) S Herrmann (Germany) L Matviyenko | 4 | 3
(Germany) K Gerlach (Germany) K Hobgarski | 6 | 3 | [7]
3 | (Germany) V Heisen (Poland) A Rosolska | 4 | 6 | [10]
WC | (Germany) E Lys (Germany) N Noha Akugue | 2 | 5
(Germany) M Barthel (Luxembourg) M Minella | 6 | 7
(Romania) I Bara (Italy) S Errani | 6 | 6
2 | (France) E Lechemia (United States) I Neel | 2 | 2

Quarterfinals
1 | (Belarus) L Marozava (Czech Republic) R Voráčová | 2 | 6 | [9]
(Russia) A Panova (Germany) J Wachaczyk | 6 | 2 | [11]
(Germany) T Korpatsch (Germany) A Zaja | 2 | 4
(Italy) J Paolini (Switzerland) J Teichmann | 6 | 6
(Australia) A Sharma (Netherlands) R van der Hoek | 7^{7} | 6
3 | (Germany) V Heisen (Poland) A Rosolska | 6^{5} | 4
(Germany) M Barthel (Luxembourg) M Minella | 6 | 2 | [10]
(Romania) I Bara (Italy) S Errani | 1 | 6 | [8]

Semifinals
(Russia) A Panova (Germany) J Wachaczyk | 6^{3} | 6 | [5]
(Italy) J Paolini (Switzerland) J Teichmann | 7^{7} | 3 | [10]
(Australia) A Sharma (Netherlands) R van der Hoek | 6 | 6
(Germany) M Barthel (Luxembourg) M Minella | 3 | 4

Final
(Italy) J Paolini (Switzerland) J Teichmann | 6 | 6
(Australia) A Sharma (Netherlands) R van der Hoek | 0 | 4
