= 2016 BFD Energy Challenger – Doubles =

Doubles
- 2016 BFD Energy Challenger

Final
- Champions: (Italy) Federico Gaio (Italy) Stefano Napolitano
- Runners-up: (Croatia) Marin Draganja (Croatia) Tomislav Draganja
- Score: 6–7^{(2–7)}, 6–2, [10–3]

Events
Singles	Doubles
← 2015 ·	BFD Energy Challenger	· 2017 →

Tomasz Bednarek and Mateusz Kowalczyk were the defending champions but chose not to defend their title.

Federico Gaio and Stefano Napolitano won the title after defeating Marin and Tomislav Draganja 6–7^{(2–7)}, 6–2, [10–3] in the final.

== Seeds ==
1. (Croatia) Dino Marcan / (Slovakia) Andrej Martin (semifinals)
2. (Italy) Andrea Arnaboldi / (Croatia) Antonio Šančić (withdrew)
3. (Italy) Riccardo Ghedin / (Italy) Alessandro Motti (semifinals)
4. (Netherlands) Mark Vervoort / (Serbia) Ilija Vučić (quarterfinals)

== Draw ==
=== Key ===
- Q = Qualifier
- WC = Wild card
- LL = Lucky loser
- Alt = Alternate
- SE = Special exempt
- PR = Protected ranking
- ITF = ITF entry
- JE = Junior exempt
- w/o = Walkover
- r = Retired
- d = Defaulted
- SR = Special ranking

First round
WC	(Italy) Giorgio Portaluri (Colombia) C Rodríguez	6	6
(Austria) Gibril Diarra (Austria) B Trinker	4	3
4	(Netherlands) M Vervoort (Serbia) Ilija Vučić	6	6
(Spain) D Marrero (Spain) R Ramírez Hidalgo	3	4
(France) T Lamasine (France) A Michon	3	4
(Italy) F Gaio (Italy) S Napolitano	6	6
(Netherlands) T de Bakker (Netherlands) R Haase	6	6
WC	(Italy) M Cecchinato (Italy) G Di Meo	3	2
(Croatia) M Draganja (Croatia) T Draganja	6	6
(Italy) G Quinzi (Sweden) E Ymer	4	4

Quarterfinals
1	(Croatia) D Marcan (Slovakia) A Martin	6	6
WC	(Italy) G Portaluri (Colombia) C Rodríguez	1	3
4	(Netherlands) M Vervoort (Serbia) I Vučić	6^{2}	2
(Italy) F Gaio (Italy) S Napolitano	7^{7}	6
(Netherlands) T de Bakker (Netherlands) R Haase	4	6	[8]
3	(Italy) R Ghedin (Italy) A Motti	6	0	[10]
(Croatia) M Draganja (Croatia) T Draganja	w/o
2	(Italy) A Arnaboldi (Croatia) A Šančić

Semifinals
1	(Croatia) D Marcan (Slovakia) A Martin	6	4	[8]
(Italy) F Gaio (Italy) S Napolitano	2	6	[10]
3	(Italy) R Ghedin (Italy) A Motti	2	3
(Croatia) M Draganja (Croatia) T Draganja	6	6

Final
(Italy) F Gaio (Italy) S Napolitano	6^{2}	6	[10]
(Croatia) M Draganja (Croatia) T Draganja	7^{7}	2	[3]
