= 2017 BFD Energy Challenger – Singles =

Singles
- 2017 BFD Energy Challenger

Final
- Champion: (Serbia) Filip Krajinović
- Runner-up: (Spain) Daniel Gimeno Traver
- Score: 6–4, 6–3

Events
Singles	Doubles
← 2016 ·	BFD Energy Challenger	· 2018 →

Jan Šátral was the defending champion but chose not to defend his title.

Filip Krajinović won the title after defeating Daniel Gimeno Traver 6–4, 6–3 in the final.

== Seeds ==
1. (Germany) Florian Mayer (withdrew)
2. (Serbia) Laslo Đere (quarterfinals)
3. (Spain) Guillermo García López (quarterfinals)
4. (Italy) Marco Cecchinato (first round)
5. (Spain) Roberto Carballés Baena (semifinals)
6. (Portugal) Pedro Sousa (second round)
7. (Serbia) Filip Krajinović (champion)
8. (United States) Bjorn Fratangelo (first round)
9. (Italy) Stefano Travaglia (first round)

== Draw ==
=== Key ===
- Q = Qualifier
- WC = Wild card
- LL = Lucky loser
- Alt = Alternate
- ITF = ITF entry
- PR = Protected ranking
- SR = Special ranking
- SE = Special exempt
- JE = Junior exempt
- JR = Junior Accelerator Programme entrant
- CO = College Accelerator Programme entrant
- NG = Next Gen Accelerator Program entrant
- w/o = Walkover
- r = Retired
- d = Defaulted

=== Finals ===
Semifinals
SE	(Spain) Carlos Taberner	1	1
7	(Serbia) Filip Krajinović	6	6
Q	(Spain) Daniel Gimeno Traver	6	6
5	(Spain) Roberto Carballés Baena	2	4

Final
7	(Serbia) Filip Krajinović	6	6
Q	(Spain) Daniel Gimeno Traver	4	3

=== Top half ===
First round
9	(Italy) S Travaglia	6	5	5
WC	(Italy) A Arnaboldi	4	7	7
(Italy) L Giustino	1	3
Q	(Argentina) Patricio Heras	6	6
SE	(Spain) C Taberner	7	6
Q	(Spain) Í Cervantes	5	2
(Belgium) A De Greef	1	4
6	(Portugal) P Sousa	6	6
3	(Spain) G García López	7^{7}	3	6
(Portugal) G Elias	6^{4}	6	2
LL	(France) E Benchetrit	6	6
WC	(Italy) M Donati	3	4
WC	(Italy) GM Moroni	6	6
(Italy) S Napolitano	3	4
(Slovakia) J Kovalík	2	2
7	(Serbia) F Krajinović	6	6

Second round
WC	(Italy) A Arnaboldi	3	1
Q	(Argentina) P Heras	6	6
SE	(Spain) C Taberner	6	3	6
6	(Portugal) P Sousa	3	6	1
3	(Spain) G García López	6	6
LL	(France) E Benchetrit	0	1
WC	(Italy) GM Moroni	4	2
7	(Serbia) F Krajinović	6	6

Quarterfinals
Q	(Argentina) P Heras	4	3
SE	(Spain) C Taberner	6	6
3	(Spain) G García López	2	2
7	(Serbia) F Krajinović	6	6

Semifinals
SE	(Spain) C Taberner	1	1
7	(Serbia) F Krajinović	6	6

=== Bottom half ===
First round
8	(United States) B Fratangelo	3	4
(Spain) R Ojeda Lara	6	6
(Norway) C Ruud	2	4
(Slovakia) M Kližan	6	6
WC	(Italy) Cristian Carli	7^{11}	0	2
SE	(Romania) A Ungur	6^{9}	6	6
Q	(Spain) D Gimeno Traver	6	6
4	(Italy) M Cecchinato	4	0
5	(Spain) R Carballés Baena	6	7^{7}
(Germany) O Otte	3	6^{2}
(Spain) T Robredo	7	3	7^{7}
(Portugal) J Domingues	5	6	6^{4}
(Italy) S Caruso	7^{7}	3
Q	(Italy) A Virgili	6^{4}	3^{r}
(Spain) N Almagro	3	2
2	(Serbia) L Đere	6	6

Second round
(Spain) R Ojeda Lara	7^{8}	6
(Slovakia) M Kližan	6^{6}	2
SE	(Romania) A Ungur	6^{5}	5
Q	(Spain) D Gimeno Traver	7^{7}	7
5	(Spain) R Carballés Baena	6	4
(Spain) T Robredo	3	2^{r}
(Italy) S Caruso	6^{7}	2
2	(Serbia) L Đere	7^{9}	6

Quarterfinals
(Spain) R Ojeda Lara	2	6	2
Q	(Spain) D Gimeno Traver	6	0	6
5	(Spain) R Carballés Baena	6	6
2	(Serbia) L Đere	3	1

Semifinals
Q	(Spain) D Gimeno Traver	6	6
5	(Spain) R Carballés Baena	2	4
