= 2002 Betty Barclay Cup – Singles =

Singles
- 2002 Betty Barclay Cup

Final
- Champion: (Belgium) Kim Clijsters
- Runner-up: (United States) Venus Williams
- Score: 1–6, 6–3, 6–4

Details
- Draw: 28
- Seeds: 8

Events
Singles	Doubles
← 2001 ·	WTA Hamburg	· 2021 →

Venus Williams was the defending champion, but lost in the final 1–6, 6–3, 6–4 against Kim Clijsters.

== Seeds ==
1. (United States) Venus Williams (final)
2. (Belgium) Kim Clijsters (champion)
3. (Switzerland) Martina Hingis (semifinals)
4. (Belgium) Justine Henin (quarterfinals)
5. (Federal Republic of Yugoslavia) Jelena Dokic (semifinals, retired due to a right hamstring strain)
6. (Slovakia) Daniela Hantuchová (quarterfinals)
7. (Switzerland) Patty Schnyder (first round)
8. (Spain) Arantxa Sánchez Vicario (quarterfinals)

== Draw ==
Key

- Q = Qualifier
- WC = Wild card
- LL = Lucky loser
- Alt = Alternate
- ITF = ITF entry
- PR = Protected ranking
- SR = Special ranking
- SE = Special exempt
- JE = Junior exempt
- JR = Junior Accelerator Programme entrant
- CO = College Accelerator Programme entrant
- NG = Next Gen Accelerator Program entrant
- w/o = Walkover
- r = Retired
- d = Defaulted

=== Finals ===
Semifinals
1	(United States) Venus Williams	7	6
3	(Switzerland) Martina Hingis	5	3
5	(Federal Republic of Yugoslavia) Jelena Dokic	4	4^{r}
2	(Belgium) Kim Clijsters	6	4

Final
1	(United States) Venus Williams	6	3	4
2	(Belgium) Kim Clijsters	1	6	6

=== Top half ===
First round
(Uzbekistan) I Tulyaganova	0	1
(Italy) F Schiavone	6	6
WC	(Germany) M Müller	3	6	6
(Thailand) T Tanasugarn	6	0	0
(Italy) Ad Serra Zanetti	1	3
8	(Spain) A Sánchez Vicario	6	6
(Spain) C Torrens Valero	4	6	7
Q	(Germany) A Bachmann	6	2	5
(Russia) T Panova	5	1
(Spain) M Serna	7	6
Q	(Spain) M Marrero	1	1
6	(Slovakia) D Hantuchová	6	6

Second round
1	(United States) V Williams	6	6
(Italy) F Schiavone	2	3
WC	(Germany) M Müller	4	6	6^{4}
8	(Spain) A Sánchez Vicario	6	2	7^{7}
3	(Switzerland) M Hingis	6	6
(Spain) C Torrens Valero	1	0
(Spain) M Serna	6^{5}	3
6	(Slovakia) D Hantuchová	7^{7}	6

Quarterfinals
1	(United States) V Williams	3	6	6
8	(Spain) A Sánchez Vicario	6	4	1
3	(Switzerland) M Hingis	7	6
6	(Slovakia) D Hantuchová	5	4

Semifinals
1	(United States) V Williams	7	6
3	(Switzerland) M Hingis	5	3

=== Bottom half ===
First round
5	(Federal Republic of Yugoslavia) J Dokic	6	0	6
(Russia) A Myskina	3	6	2
(Spain) C Martínez	7^{7}	6
WC	(Germany) M Weingärtner	6^{5}	3
Q	(Germany) A Glass	2	3
(Australia) N Pratt	6	6
7	(Switzerland) P Schnyder	6	4	4
Q	(Germany) A Barna	2	6	6
(Austria) B Schett	7	6
(Slovakia) M Suchá	5	4
(Russia) E Likhovtseva	2	6	6
WC	(Germany) B Rittner	6	4	1

Second round
5	(Federal Republic of Yugoslavia) J Dokic	3	6	6
(Spain) C Martínez	6	2	1
(Australia) N Pratt	3	4
4	(Belgium) J Henin	6	6
Q	(Germany) A Barna	1	2
(Austria) B Schett	6	6
WC	(Germany) B Rittner	3	1^{r}
2	(Belgium) K Clijsters	6	2

Quarterfinals
5	(Federal Republic of Yugoslavia) J Dokic	7^{7}	7^{7}
4	(Belgium) J Henin	6^{3}	6^{3}
(Austria) B Schett	4	2
2	(Belgium) K Clijsters	6	6

Semifinals
5	(Federal Republic of Yugoslavia) J Dokic	4	4^{r}
2	(Belgium) K Clijsters	6	4
