= 2017 BFD Energy Challenger =

- Date: 25 September – 1 October
- Edition: 3rd
- Draw: 32S / 16D
- Surface: Clay
- Location: Rome, Italy

Champions

Singles
- (Serbia) Filip Krajinović

Doubles
- (Slovakia) Martin Kližan / (Slovakia) Jozef Kovalík
← 2016 ·	BFD Energy Challenger	· 2018 →

The 2017 BFD Energy Challenger was a professional tennis tournament played on clay courts. It was the third edition of the tournament which was part of the 2017 ATP Challenger Tour. It took place in Rome, Italy between 25 September and 1 October 2017.

== Singles main-draw entrants ==
=== Seeds ===
Country	Player	Rank^{1}	Seed
GER	~~Florian Mayer~~	~~63~~	~~1~~
SRB	Laslo Đere	97	2
ESP	Guillermo García López	102	3
ITA	Marco Cecchinato	103	4
ESP	Roberto Carballés Baena	104	5
POR	Pedro Sousa	105	6
SRB	Filip Krajinović	109	7
USA	Bjorn Fratangelo	118	8
ITA	Stefano Travaglia	129	9

- ^{1} Rankings are as of 18 September 2017.

=== Other entrants ===
The following players received wild cards into the singles main draw:

- (Italy) Andrea Arnaboldi
- (Italy) Cristian Carli
- (Italy) Matteo Donati
- (Italy) Gian Marco Moroni

The following players received entry into the singles main draw as special exempts:

- (Spain) Carlos Taberner
- (Romania) Adrian Ungur

The following players received entry from the qualifying draw:

- (Spain) Íñigo Cervantes
- (Spain) Daniel Gimeno Traver
- (Argentina) Patricio Heras
- (Italy) Adelchi Virgili

The following player received entry as a lucky loser:

- (France) Elliot Benchetrit

== Champions ==
=== Singles ===
- (Serbia) Filip Krajinović def. (Spain) Daniel Gimeno Traver 6–4, 6–3.

=== Doubles ===
- (Slovakia) Martin Kližan / (Slovakia) Jozef Kovalík def. (Belgium) Sander Gillé / (Belgium) Joran Vliegen 6–3, 7–6^{(7–5)}.
