= 2015 BFD Energy Challenger – Singles =

Singles
- 2015 BFD Energy Challenger

Final
- Champion: (Argentina) Federico Delbonis
- Runner-up: (Serbia) Filip Krajinović
- Score: 1–6, 6–3, 6–4

Events
Singles	Doubles
BFD Energy Challenger	· 2016 →

This is the first edition of the tournament.

== Seeds ==
1. (Argentina) Federico Delbonis (champion)
2. (Spain) Daniel Gimeno-Traver (second round)
3. (Serbia) Dušan Lajović (semifinals)
4. (Italy) Marco Cecchinato (semifinals)
5. (Serbia) Filip Krajinović (final)
6. (Spain) Íñigo Cervantes (quarterfinals)
7. (Japan) Taro Daniel (first round)
8. (Spain) Albert Montañés (quarterfinals)

== Draw ==
=== Key ===
- Q = Qualifier
- WC = Wild card
- LL = Lucky loser
- Alt = Alternate
- SE = Special exempt
- PR = Protected ranking
- ITF = ITF entry
- JE = Junior exempt
- w/o = Walkover
- r = Retired
- d = Defaulted
- SR = Special ranking

=== Finals ===
Semifinals
1	(Argentina) Federico Delbonis	7^{10}	7^{7}
3	(Serbia) Dušan Lajović	6^{8}	6^{5}
4	(Italy) Marco Cecchinato	5	4
5	(Serbia) Filip Krajinović	7	6

Final
1	(Argentina) Federico Delbonis	1	6	6
5	(Serbia) Filip Krajinović	6	3	4

=== Top half ===
First round
1	(Argentina) F Delbonis	6	6
Q	(Italy) L Giustino	1	4
WC	(Italy) G Di Meo	6	6
Q	(Greece) S Tsitsipas	4	4
PR	(Spain) J Martí	7	5	6
WC	(Italy) G Mager	5	7	2
Q	(Italy) A Giannessi	6	3	2
8	(Spain) A Montañés	2	6	6
3	(Serbia) D Lajović	6	7^{7}
(Spain) R Ramírez Hidalgo	1	6^{2}
(Italy) M Viola	3	7^{8}	6
(Spain) R Carballés Baena	6	6^{6}	1
(Spain) P Riba	6	6
WC	(Italy) F Cipolla	3	2
(Belarus) U Ignatik	6	6
7	(Japan) T Daniel	2	4

Second round
1	(Argentina) F Delbonis	6	6
WC	(Italy) G Di Meo	2	0
PR	(Spain) J Martí	6	6^{2}	3
8	(Spain) A Montañés	4	7^{7}	6
3	(Serbia) D Lajović	6	6
(Italy) M Viola	2	0
(Spain) P Riba	2	6	6
(Belarus) U Ignatik	6	1	3

Quarterfinals
1	(Argentina) F Delbonis	7	6
8	(Spain) A Montañés	5	1
3	(Serbia) D Lajović	4	6	6
(Spain) P Riba	6	3	2

Semifinals
1	(Argentina) F Delbonis	7^{10}	7^{7}
3	(Serbia) D Lajović	6^{8}	6^{5}

=== Bottom half ===
First round
6	(Spain) Í Cervantes	6	6
WC	(Italy) M Berrettini	3	4
(Italy) F Volandri	6	6
SE	(Serbia) M Zekić	2	0
(Italy) G Naso	6	6
(Italy) S Caruso	3	2
(Slovakia) A Martin	1	4
4	(Italy) M Cecchinato	6	6
5	(Serbia) F Krajinović	6	6
(Argentina) P Cachin	3	1
(Hungary) M Fucsovics	6	6
(France) C Hemery	2	0
Q	(Italy) R Bonadio	0	2
(Netherlands) T de Bakker	6	6
(Italy) F Gaio	3	2
2	(Spain) D Gimeno-Traver	6	6

Second round
6	(Spain) Í Cervantes	6	4	6
(Italy) F Volandri	0	6	1
(Italy) G Naso	6	4	1
4	(Italy) M Cecchinato	2	6	6
5	(Serbia) F Krajinović	2	7	6
(Hungary) M Fucsovics	6	5	1
(Netherlands) T de Bakker	6	5	6
2	(Spain) D Gimeno-Traver	3	7	3

Quarterfinals
6	(Spain) Í Cervantes	1	4
4	(Italy) M Cecchinato	6	6
5	(Serbia) F Krajinović	6	6
(Netherlands) T de Bakker	1	3

Semifinals
4	(Italy) M Cecchinato	5	4
5	(Serbia) F Krajinović	7	6
