= 2016 BFD Energy Challenger – Singles =

Singles
- 2016 BFD Energy Challenger

Final
- Champion: (Czech Republic) Jan Šátral
- Runner-up: (Netherlands) Robin Haase
- Score: 6–3, 6–2

Events
Singles	Doubles
← 2015 ·	BFD Energy Challenger	· 2017 →

Federico Delbonis was the defending champion but chose not to defend his title.

Jan Šátral won the title after defeating Robin Haase 6–3, 6–2 in the final.

== Seeds ==
1. (Netherlands) Robin Haase (final)
2. (Czech Republic) Adam Pavlásek (first round)
3. (United Kingdom) Aljaž Bedene (quarterfinals)
4. (Spain) Daniel Gimeno-Traver (second round, retired)
5. (Slovakia) Andrej Martin (quarterfinals)
6. (Netherlands) Thiemo de Bakker (first round)
7. (Spain) Rubén Ramírez Hidalgo (second round)
8. (Hungary) Márton Fucsovics (quarterfinals)

== Draw ==
=== Key ===
- Q = Qualifier
- WC = Wild card
- LL = Lucky loser
- Alt = Alternate
- SE = Special exempt
- PR = Protected ranking
- ITF = ITF entry
- JE = Junior exempt
- w/o = Walkover
- r = Retired
- d = Defaulted
- SR = Special ranking

=== Finals ===
Semifinals
1	(Netherlands) Robin Haase	6	4	6
(France) Tristan Lamasine	3	6	3
(Czech Republic) Jan Šátral	6	3	6
Q	(Sweden) Mikael Ymer	4	6	2

Final
1	(Netherlands) Robin Haase	3	2
(Czech Republic) Jan Šátral	6	6

=== Top half ===
First round
1	(Netherlands) R Haase	4	6	6
(Canada) S Diez	6	3	3
WC	(Italy) Davide Pontoglio	4	6	6
(Austria) B Trinker	6	0	2
WC	(Italy) S Napolitano	3	4
(Chile) C Garin	6	6
(Serbia) L Đere	3	6	4
5	(Slovakia) A Martin	6	1	6
4	(Spain) D Gimeno-Traver	7^{9}	6
Q	(Austria) Gibril Diarra	6^{7}	4
(Austria) D Novak	3	4
(France) T Lamasine	6	6
(Sweden) E Ymer	2	6	6
(Romania) A Ungur	6	3	4
(Italy) F Volandri	6	6
6	(Netherlands) T de Bakker	2	3

Second round
1	(Netherlands) R Haase	6	6
WC	(Italy) D Pontoglio	2	2
(Chile) C Garin	4	6^{3}
5	(Slovakia) A Martin	6	7^{7}
4	(Spain) D Gimeno-Traver	7^{7}	6^{3}	2^{r}
(France) T Lamasine	6^{3}	7^{7}	4
(Sweden) E Ymer	7	7^{7}
(Italy) F Volandri	5	6^{1}

Quarterfinals
1	(Netherlands) R Haase	6	6
5	(Slovakia) A Martin	1	3
(France) T Lamasine	2	6	6
(Sweden) E Ymer	6	2	3

Semifinals
1	(Netherlands) R Haase	6	4	6
(France) T Lamasine	3	6	3

=== Bottom half ===
First round
7	(Spain) R Ramírez Hidalgo	6	7^{7}
(France) A Michon	4	6^{4}
(Czech Republic) J Šátral	6	6
(Italy) L Giustino	0	4
(Italy) F Gaio	6	3	6
WC	(Italy) A Pellegrino	1	6	2
(Italy) M Cecchinato	1	1
3	(United Kingdom) A Bedene	6	6
8	(Hungary) M Fucsovics	6	6
(France) M Bourgue	3	3
WC	(Italy) G Quinzi	3	5
Q	(Italy) G Mager	6	7
Q	(Sweden) M Ymer	6	6
Q	(France) M Janvier	4	2
(Italy) A Arnaboldi	7^{7}	6
2	(Czech Republic) A Pavlásek	6^{3}	4

Second round
7	(Spain) R Ramírez Hidalgo	6	3	2
(Czech Republic) J Šátral	3	6	6
(Italy) F Gaio	0	6	2
3	(United Kingdom) A Bedene	6	4	6
8	(Hungary) M Fucsovics	6	6
Q	(Italy) G Mager	0	3
Q	(Sweden) M Ymer	6	1	7^{8}
(Italy) A Arnaboldi	4	6	6^{6}

Quarterfinals
(Czech Republic) J Šátral	6	6
3	(United Kingdom) A Bedene	4	4
8	(Hungary) M Fucsovics	6	3	5
Q	(Sweden) M Ymer	4	6	7

Semifinals
(Czech Republic) J Šátral	6	3	6
Q	(Sweden) M Ymer	4	6	2
