= 2002 Betty Barclay Cup – Doubles =

Doubles
- 2002 Betty Barclay Cup

Final
- Champions: (Switzerland) Martina Hingis (Austria) Barbara Schett
- Runners-up: (Slovakia) Daniela Hantuchová (Spain) Arantxa Sánchez Vicario
- Score: 6–1, 6–1

Details
- Draw: 16
- Seeds: 4

Events
Singles	Doubles
← 2001 ·	Hamburg European Open	· 2021 →

Cara Black and Elena Likhovtseva were the defending champions, but lost in semifinals to Martina Hingis and Barbara Schett.

Martina Hingis and Barbara Schett won the title by defeating Daniela Hantuchová and Arantxa Sánchez Vicario 6–1, 6–1 in the final.

== Seeds ==
1. (Zimbabwe) Cara Black / (Russia) Elena Likhovtseva (semifinals)
2. (Slovakia) Daniela Hantuchová / (Spain) Arantxa Sánchez Vicario (final)
3. (Federal Republic of Yugoslavia) Jelena Dokic / (Spain) Conchita Martínez (quarterfinals, withdrew due to a right hamstring strain on Dokic)
4. (Switzerland) Martina Hingis / (Austria) Barbara Schett (champions)

== Draw ==
Key

- Q = Qualifier
- WC = Wild card
- LL = Lucky loser
- Alt = Alternate
- ITF = ITF entry
- PR = Protected ranking
- SR = Special ranking
- SE = Special exempt
- JE = Junior exempt
- JR = Junior Accelerator Programme entrant
- CO = College Accelerator Programme entrant
- NG = Next Gen Accelerator Program entrant
- w/o = Walkover
- r = Retired
- d = Defaulted

=== Draw ===
First round
1	(Zimbabwe) C Black (Russia) E Likhovtseva	6	4	6
(Australia) N Pratt (Spain) M Serna	1	6	3
(Italy) F Schiavone (Italy) Ad Serra Zanetti	6^{4}	6	6
(Germany) B Lamade (Russia) A Rodionova	7^{7}	1	3
4	(Switzerland) M Hingis (Austria) B Schett	6	6
(Australia) C Barclay (Thailand) T Tanasugarn	2	1
(Germany) B Rittner (Belarus) N Zvereva	6	6
(Netherlands) K Boogert (Netherlands) A Hopmans	4	1
Q	(Spain) G León García (Argentina) P Tarabini	4	2
(Spain) E Bes (Spain) M Marrero	6	6
(Paraguay) R de los Ríos (Uzbekistan) I Tulyaganova	4	2
3	(Federal Republic of Yugoslavia) J Dokic (Spain) C Martínez	6	6
(Germany) M Müller (Germany) M Weingärtner	6^{7}	2
(Germany) A Barna (Germany) V Henke	7^{9}	6
WC	(Germany) A Glass (Spain) C Torrens Valero	5	2
2	(Slovakia) D Hantuchová (Spain) A Sánchez Vicario	7	6

Quarterfinals
1	(Zimbabwe) C Black (Russia) E Likhovtseva	6	2	6
(Italy) F Schiavone (Italy) Ad Serra Zanetti	3	6	4
4	(Switzerland) M Hingis (Austria) B Schett	w/o
(Germany) B Rittner (Belarus) N Zvereva
(Spain) E Bes (Spain) M Marrero	w/o
3	(Federal Republic of Yugoslavia) J Dokic (Spain) C Martínez
(Germany) A Barna (Germany) V Henke	0	2
2	(Slovakia) D Hantuchová (Spain) A Sánchez Vicario	6	6

Semifinals
1	(Zimbabwe) C Black (Russia) E Likhovtseva	2	1
4	(Switzerland) M Hingis (Austria) B Schett	6	6
(Spain) E Bes (Spain) M Marrero	2	6	3
2	(Slovakia) D Hantuchová (Spain) A Sánchez Vicario	6	4	6

Final
4	(Switzerland) M Hingis (Austria) B Schett	6	6
2	(Slovakia) D Hantuchová (Spain) A Sánchez Vicario	1	1
