= 2015 BFD Energy Challenger =

- Date: 28 September – 4 October
- Edition: 1st
- Draw: 32S / 16D
- Prize money: €42,500 + H
- Surface: Clay
- Location: Rome, Italy

Champions

Singles
- (Argentina) Federico Delbonis

Doubles
- (Poland) Tomasz Bednarek / (Poland) Mateusz Kowalczyk
BFD Energy Challenger	· 2016 →

The 2015 BFD Energy Challenger was a professional tennis tournament played on clay courts. It was the first edition of the tournament which was part of the 2015 ATP Challenger Tour. It took place in Rome, Italy between 28 September and 4 October 2015.

== Singles main-draw entrants ==
=== Seeds ===
Country	Player	Rank^{1}	Seed
ARG	Federico Delbonis	64	1
ESP	Daniel Gimeno Traver	78	2
SRB	Dušan Lajović	86	3
ITA	Marco Cecchinato	91	4
SRB	Filip Krajinović	97	5
ESP	Íñigo Cervantes	102	6
JPN	Taro Daniel	122	7
ESP	Albert Montañés	124	8

- ^{1} Rankings are as of September 21, 2015.

=== Other entrants ===
The following players received wild cards into the singles main draw:

- (Italy) Giulio Di Meo
- (Italy) Gianluca Mager
- (Italy) Flavio Cipolla
- (Italy) Matteo Berrettini

The following player received entry into the singles main draw using a protected ranking:

- (Spain) Javier Martí

The following player received entry into the singles main draw as a special exempt:

- (Serbia) Miljan Zekić

The following players received entry from the qualifying draw:

- (Italy) Lorenzo Giustino
- (Italy) Alessandro Giannessi
- (Greece) Stefanos Tsitsipas
- (Italy) Riccardo Bonadio

== Champions ==
=== Singles ===
- (Argentina) Federico Delbonis def. (Serbia) Filip Krajinović, 1–6, 6–3, 6–4.

=== Doubles ===
- (Poland) Tomasz Bednarek / (Poland) Mateusz Kowalczyk def. (Spain) Íñigo Cervantes / (Netherlands) Mark Vervoort, 6–2, 6–1.
