= 2001 Betty Barclay Cup – Singles =

Singles
- 2001 Betty Barclay Cup

Final
- Champion: (United States) Venus Williams
- Runner-up: (United States) Meghann Shaughnessy
- Score: 6–3, 6–0

Details
- Draw: 28
- Seeds: 8

Events
Singles	Doubles
← 2000 ·	Betty Barclay Cup	· 2002 →

Martina Hingis was the defending champion but did not compete that year.

Venus Williams won in the final 6–3, 6–0 against Meghann Shaughnessy.

== Seeds ==
A champion seed is indicated in bold text while text in italics indicates the round in which that seed was eliminated. The top four seeds received a bye to the second round.

1. (United States) **Venus Williams (champion)**
2. (South Africa) Amanda Coetzer (semifinals)
3. (Spain) Conchita Martínez (second round)
4. (Spain) Arantxa Sánchez-Vicario (quarterfinals)
5. (Bulgaria) Magdalena Maleeva (second round)
6. (Belgium) Justine Henin (quarterfinals)
7. (United States) Meghann Shaughnessy (final)
8. (Spain) Magüi Serna (first round)

== Draw ==
Key

- Q = Qualifier
- WC = Wild card
- LL = Lucky loser
- Alt = Alternate
- ITF = ITF entry
- PR = Protected ranking
- SR = Special ranking
- SE = Special exempt
- JE = Junior exempt
- JR = Junior Accelerator Programme entrant
- CO = College Accelerator Programme entrant
- NG = Next Gen Accelerator Program entrant
- w/o = Walkover
- r = Retired
- d = Defaulted

=== Final ===
Final
1	(United States) **Venus Williams**	**6**	**6**
7	(United States) Meghann Shaughnessy	3	0

=== Top half ===
First round
(Spain) **G León García**	**6**	**6**
Q	(Germany) M Müller	1	2
(Italy) **S Farina Elia**	**6**	**7**
(Italy) T Garbin	4	5
WC	(Germany) **A Glass**	**6**	**6**
8	(Spain) M Serna	4	3
Q	(Czech Republic) **D Chládková**	**6**	**6**
(Slovakia) H Nagyová	4	4
Q	(Germany) B Rittner	**6**	2	2
(Federal Republic of Yugoslavia) **J Dokić**	4	**6**	**6**
(Romania) R Dragomir Ilie	5	**7^{8}**	3
5	(Bulgaria) **M Maleeva**	**7**	6^{6}	**6**

Second round
1	(United States) **V Williams**	**6**	**6**
(Spain) G León García	1	2
(Italy) **S Farina Elia**	**6**	**6**
WC	(Germany) A Glass	1	1
4	(Spain) **A Sánchez-Vicario**	**6**	**6**
Q	(Czech Republic) D Chládková	2	2
(Federal Republic of Yugoslavia) **J Dokić**	**6**	**6**
5	(Bulgaria) M Maleeva	1	1

Quarterfinals
1	(United States) **V Williams**	**6**	**6**
(Italy) S Farina Elia	1	1
4	(Spain) A Sánchez-Vicario	**6**	6^{5}	2
(Federal Republic of Yugoslavia) **J Dokić**	3	**7^{7}**	**6**

Semifinals
1	(United States) **V Williams**	**6**	**6**
(Federal Republic of Yugoslavia) J Dokić	3	1

=== Bottom half ===
First round
7	(United States) **M Shaughnessy**	**6**	**6**
(United States) K Brandi	2	2
(Zimbabwe) C Black	2	3
(Czech Republic) **K Hrdličková**	**6**	**6**
WC	(Switzerland) **P Schnyder**	**6**	**7**
(Austria) B Schett	4	5
6	(Belgium) **J Henin**	6^{5}	**6**	**6**
(France) A-G Sidot	**7^{7}**	3	2
(Russia) **E Likhovtseva**	2	**6**	**6**
Q	(Sweden) Å Carlsson	**6**	2	3
(Russia) T Panova	6^{5}	4
WC	(Germany) **B Lamade**	**7^{7}**	**6**

Second round
7	(United States) **M Shaughnessy**	**6**	**7^{7}**
(Czech Republic) K Hrdličková	1	6^{2}
WC	(Switzerland) **P Schnyder**	**6**	2	**6**
3	(Spain) C Martínez	3	**6**	2
6	(Belgium) **J Henin**	**7^{7}**	1	**6**
(Russia) E Likhovtseva	6^{3}	**6**	2
WC	(Germany) B Lamade	**6**	3	1
2	(South Africa) **A Coetzer**	2	**6**	**6**

Quarterfinals
7	(United States) **M Shaughnessy**	**6**	**6**
WC	(Switzerland) P Schnyder	4	4
6	(Belgium) J Henin	5	**6**	2
2	(South Africa) **A Coetzer**	**7**	4	**6**

Semifinals
7	(United States) **M Shaughnessy**	**6**	**6**
2	(South Africa) A Coetzer	3	4
