= 2021 Hamburg European Open – Women's singles =

Women's singles
- 2021 Hamburg European Open

Final
- Champion: (Romania) Elena-Gabriela Ruse
- Runner-up: (Germany) Andrea Petkovic
- Score: 7–6^{(8–6)}, 6–4

Details
- Draw: 28
- Seeds: 8

Events
Singles	men	women
Doubles	men	women
- Hamburg European Open

Kim Clijsters was the defending champion, having won the previous edition in 2002, but chose not to participate.

Unseeded Elena-Gabriela Ruse won her maiden WTA Tour singles title as a qualifier, defeating Andrea Petkovic in the final, 7–6^{(8–6)}, 6–4.

This tournament marked Dayana Yastremska's return to professional tennis, after her suspension for testing positive for a prohibited substance was lifted by the ITF.

== Seeds ==
The top four seeds received a bye into the second round.

1. (Ukraine) Dayana Yastremska (semifinals)
2. (Kazakhstan) Yulia Putintseva (second round)
3. (Slovenia) Tamara Zidanšek (quarterfinals)
4. (United States) Danielle Collins (quarterfinals)
5. (France) Fiona Ferro (first round)
6. (Switzerland) Jil Teichmann (first round)
7. (United States) Bernarda Pera (second round)
8. (France) Caroline Garcia (first round)

== Draw ==
Key

- Q = Qualifier
- WC = Wild card
- LL = Lucky loser
- Alt = Alternate
- ITF = ITF entry
- PR = Protected ranking
- SR = Special ranking
- SE = Special exempt
- JE = Junior exempt
- JR = Junior Accelerator Programme entrant
- CO = College Accelerator Programme entrant
- NG = Next Gen Accelerator Program entrant
- w/o = Walkover
- r = Retired
- d = Defaulted

=== Finals ===
Semifinals
1	(Ukraine) Dayana Yastremska	6	1	4
Q	(Romania) Elena-Gabriela Ruse	2	6	6
WC	(Germany) Jule Niemeier	6^{4}	6	5
(Germany) Andrea Petkovic	7^{7}	4	7

Final
Q	(Romania) Elena-Gabriela Ruse	7^{8}	6
(Germany) Andrea Petkovic	6^{6}	4

=== Top half ===
First round
(Poland) M Fręch	6	6
Q	(Russia) M Melnikova	4	4
(Italy) J Paolini	5	5
(Croatia) A Konjuh	7	7
(Italy) S Errani	7	6
5	(France) F Ferro	5	3
LL	(Slovakia) K Kučová	6	7^{7}
WC	(Germany) M Barthel	3	6^{4}
Q	(Germany) A Zaja	0	6	7
(Bulgaria) V Tomova	6	3	5
Q	(Romania) E-G Ruse	7	7^{7}
6	(Switzerland) J Teichmann	5	6^{1}

Second round
1	(Ukraine) D Yastremska	7^{7}	6
(Poland) M Fręch	6^{5}	1
(Croatia) A Konjuh	6^{5}	3
(Italy) S Errani	7^{7}	6
4	(United States) D Collins	1	6	6
LL	(Slovakia) K Kučová	6	2	3
Q	(Germany) A Zaja	2	2
Q	(Romania) E-G Ruse	6	6

Quarterfinals
1	(Ukraine) D Yastremska	7^{7}	6
(Italy) S Errani	6^{4}	4
4	(United States) D Collins	4	6	5
Q	(Romania) E-G Ruse	6	1	7

Semifinals
1	(Ukraine) D Yastremska	6	1	4
Q	(Romania) E-G Ruse	2	6	6

=== Bottom half ===
First round
8	(France) C Garcia	4	2
WC	(Germany) J Niemeier	6	6
Q	(Luxembourg) M Minella	5	3
WC	(Germany) T Korpatsch	7	6
(Romania) I Bara	2	6^{5}
(Czech Republic) Kr Plíšková	6	7^{7}
7	(United States) B Pera	6	6
(Poland) K Kawa	1	2
(Australia) A Sharma	6	2	4
(Belgium) Y Bonaventure	1	6	6
(Germany) A-L Friedsam	4	5
(Germany) A Petkovic	6	7

Second round
WC	(Germany) J Niemeier	6	6^{5}	6
WC	(Germany) T Korpatsch	2	7^{7}	3
(Czech Republic) Kr Plíšková	3	6	3
3	(Slovenia) T Zidanšek	6	3	6
7	(United States) B Pera	6	3	4
(Belgium) Y Bonaventure	3	6	6
(Germany) A Petkovic	6	1	6
2	(Kazakhstan) Y Putintseva	2	6	4

Quarterfinals
WC	(Germany) J Niemeier	6	6
3	(Slovenia) T Zidanšek	2	4
(Belgium) Y Bonaventure	2	5
(Germany) A Petkovic	6	7

Semifinals
WC	(Germany) J Niemeier	6^{4}	6	5
(Germany) A Petkovic	7^{7}	4	7

== Qualifying ==
=== Seeds ===
1. (Poland) Magdalena Fręch (moved to the main draw)
2. (Slovakia) Kristína Kučová (qualifying competition, lucky loser)
3. (Russia) Marina Melnikova (qualified)
4. (Romania) Elena-Gabriela Ruse (qualified)
5. (Bulgaria) Isabella Shinikova (qualifying competition)
6. (Germany) Katharina Gerlach (qualifying competition)
7. (Luxembourg) Mandy Minella (qualified)
8. (Argentina) Paula Ormaechea (first round)

=== Qualifiers ===
1. (Germany) Anna Zaja
2. (Luxembourg) Mandy Minella
3. (Russia) Marina Melnikova
4. (Romania) Elena-Gabriela Ruse

=== Lucky loser ===
1. (Slovakia) Kristína Kučová

=== Draw ===
==== First qualifier ====
First round
Alt	(Germany) Jasmin Jebawy	2	3
(Germany) Anna Zaja	6	6
(Poland) Katarzyna Piter	2	5
6	(Germany) Katharina Gerlach	6	7

Qualifying competition
(Germany) Anna Zaja	7	3	6
6	(Germany) Katharina Gerlach	5	6	4

==== Second qualifier ====
First round
2	(Slovakia) Kristína Kučová	6	4	6
(Germany) Stephanie Wagner	1	6	4
WC	(Germany) Eva Lys	5	4
7	(Luxembourg) Mandy Minella	7	6

Qualifying competition
2	(Slovakia) Kristína Kučová	3	3
7	(Luxembourg) Mandy Minella	6	6

==== Third qualifier ====
First round
3	(Russia) Marina Melnikova	6	4
(Germany) Noma Noha Akugue	1	1^{r}
WC	(Germany) Katharina Hobgarski	6	6
8	(Argentina) Paula Ormaechea	1	3

Qualifying competition
3	(Russia) Marina Melnikova	6	6
WC	(Germany) Katharina Hobgarski	4	0

==== Fourth qualifier ====
First round
4	(Romania) Elena-Gabriela Ruse	6	6
(Chinese Taipei) Liang En-shuo	2	1
(Germany) Sina Herrmann	4	2
5	(Bulgaria) Isabella Shinikova	6	6

Qualifying competition
4	(Romania) Elena-Gabriela Ruse	6	6
5	(Bulgaria) Isabella Shinikova	3	3
