= 2017 BFD Energy Challenger – Doubles =

Doubles
- 2017 BFD Energy Challenger

Final
- Champions: (Slovakia) Martin Kližan (Slovakia) Jozef Kovalík
- Runners-up: (Belgium) Sander Gillé (Belgium) Joran Vliegen
- Score: 6–3, 7–6^{(7–5)}

Events
| Singles | Doubles |
| ← 2016 · | BFD Energy Challenger | · 2018 → |

Federico Gaio and Stefano Napolitano were the defending champions but only Napolitano chose to defend his title, partnering Salvatore Caruso. Napolitano withdrew in the semifinals.

Martin Kližan and Jozef Kovalík won the title after defeating Sander Gillé and Joran Vliegen 6–3, 7–6^{(7–5)} in the final.

== Seeds ==
1. (Croatia) Marin Draganja / (Croatia) Tomislav Draganja (quarterfinals)
2. (Belgium) Sander Gillé / (Belgium) Joran Vliegen (final)
3. (Germany) Alexander Satschko / (Austria) Tristan-Samuel Weissborn (quarterfinals)
4. (Australia) Rameez Junaid / (Germany) Kevin Krawietz (semifinals)

== Draw ==
=== Key ===
- Q = Qualifier
- WC = Wild card
- LL = Lucky loser
- Alt = Alternate
- SE = Special exempt
- PR = Protected ranking
- ITF = ITF entry
- JE = Junior exempt
- w/o = Walkover
- r = Retired
- d = Defaulted
- SR = Special ranking

First round
1 | (Croatia) M Draganja (Croatia) T Draganja | 6 | 7^{7}
WC | (Italy) GM Moroni (Italy) Corrado Summaria | 2 | 6^{3}
(Slovakia) M Kližan (Slovakia) J Kovalík | 7^{7} | 6
(Italy) M Cecchinato (Italy) M Donati | 6^{4} | 3
4 | (Australia) R Junaid (Germany) K Krawietz | 7^{7} | 6
(Serbia) L Đere (Czech Republic) Z Kolář | 6^{2} | 3
(Spain) N Almagro (Brazil) E Russi Assumpção | 5 | 3
(Poland) T Bednarek (Netherlands) D Pel | 7 | 6
WC | (Italy) G Di Meo (Romania) A Ungur | 2 | 3
(Italy) S Caruso (Italy) S Napolitano | 6 | 6
WC | (Italy) A Pellegrino (Italy) A Vavassori | 3 | 6 | [8]
3 | (Germany) A Satschko (Austria) T-S Weissborn | 6 | 3 | [10]
(Italy) L Giustino (Poland) G Panfil | 5 | 6 | [10]
(Spain) Í Cervantes (Italy) A Motti | 7 | 4 | [8]
(Italy) R Ghedin (Italy) S Travaglia | 3 | 2
2 | (Belgium) S Gillé (Belgium) J Vliegen | 6 | 6

Quarterfinals
1 | (Croatia) M Draganja (Croatia) T Draganja | 2 | 1
(Slovakia) M Kližan (Slovakia) J Kovalík | 6 | 6
4 | (Australia) R Junaid (Germany) K Krawietz | 6 | 6^{3} | [10]
(Poland) T Bednarek (Netherlands) D Pel | 0 | 7^{7} | [5]
(Italy) S Caruso (Italy) S Napolitano | 6 | 3 | [10]
3 | (Germany) A Satschko (Austria) T-S Weissborn | 4 | 6 | [7]
(Italy) L Giustino (Poland) G Panfil | 1 | 3
2 | (Belgium) S Gillé (Belgium) J Vliegen | 6 | 6

Semifinals
(Slovakia) M Kližan (Slovakia) J Kovalík | 6 | 4 | [10]
4 | (Australia) R Junaid (Germany) K Krawietz | 3 | 6 | [5]
(Italy) S Caruso (Italy) S Napolitano
2 | (Belgium) S Gillé (Belgium) J Vliegen | w/o

Final
(Slovakia) M Kližan (Slovakia) J Kovalík | 6 | 7^{7}
2 | (Belgium) S Gillé (Belgium) J Vliegen | 3 | 6^{5}
