= 2021 Hamburg European Open – Men's doubles =

Tennis tournament

Men's doubles
- 2021 Hamburg European Open

Final
- Champions: (Germany) Tim Pütz (New Zealand) Michael Venus
- Runners-up: (Germany) Kevin Krawietz (Romania) Horia Tecău
- Score: 6–3, 6–7^{(3–7)}, [10–8]

Details
- Draw: 16
- Seeds: 4

Events
Singles	men	women
Doubles	men	women
- German Open Tennis Championships

John Peers and Michael Venus were the defending champions, but Peers chose not to participate this year.

Venus played alongside Tim Pütz and successfully defended his title, defeating Kevin Krawietz and Horia Tecău in the final, 6–3, 6–7^{(3–7)}, [10–8].

== Seeds ==
1. (Germany) Kevin Krawietz / (Romania) Horia Tecău (final)
2. (Germany) Tim Pütz / (New Zealand) Michael Venus (champions)
3. (Netherlands) Matwé Middelkoop / (Monaco) Hugo Nys (first round)
4. (Bosnia and Herzegovina) Tomislav Brkić / (Serbia) Nikola Ćaćić (first round)

== Draw ==
Key

- Q = Qualifier
- WC = Wild card
- LL = Lucky loser
- Alt = Alternate
- ITF = ITF entry
- PR = Protected ranking
- SR = Special ranking
- SE = Special exempt
- JE = Junior exempt
- JR = Junior Accelerator Programme entrant
- CO = College Accelerator Programme entrant
- NG = Next Gen Accelerator Program entrant
- w/o = Walkover
- r = Retired
- d = Defaulted

=== Draw ===
First round
1	(Germany) K Krawietz (Romania) H Tecău	6	6
LL	(Philippines) R Gonzales (United States) H Johnson	0	1
Q	(Italy) A Giannessi (Spain) C Taberner	3	2
WC	(Germany) D Altmaier (Germany) R Molleker	6	6
3	(Netherlands) M Middelkoop (Monaco) H Nys	4	6	[8]
(United States) J Cerretani (Mexico) H Hach Verdugo	6	3	[10]
(Croatia) I Sabanov (Croatia) M Sabanov	6	6
(Belgium) S Gillé (India) D Sharan	3	4
(Serbia) L Đere (Italy) G Mager	3	6	[3]
(Uruguay) A Behar (Ecuador) G Escobar	6	4	[10]
(Kazakhstan) A Golubev (Kazakhstan) A Nedovyesov	6	7^{7}
4	(Bosnia and Herzegovina) T Brkić (Serbia) N Ćaćić	3	6^{5}
(Serbia) F Krajinović (Serbia) D Lajović	6	6
(India) S Balaji (Switzerland) L Margaroli	3	2
WC	(Greece) Pe Tsitsipas (Greece) S Tsitsipas	5	6^{5}
2	(Germany) T Pütz (New Zealand) M Venus	7	7^{7}

Quarterfinals
1	(Germany) K Krawietz (Romania) H Tecău	6	6
WC	(Germany) D Altmeier (Germany) R Molleker	3	2
(United States) J Cerretani (Mexico) H Hach Verdugo	6	6
(Croatia) I Sabanov (Croatia) M Sabanov	4	3
(Uruguay) A Behar (Ecuador) G Escobar	4	4
(Kazakhstan) A Golubev (Kazakhstan) A Nedovyesov	6	6
(Serbia) F Krajinović (Serbia) D Lajović
2	(Germany) T Pütz (New Zealand) M Venus	w/o

Semifinals
1	(Germany) K Krawietz (Romania) H Tecău	6	6
(United States) J Cerretani (Mexico) H Hach Verdugo	3	4
(Kazakhstan) A Golubev (Kazakhstan) A Nedovyesov	3	4
2	(Germany) T Pütz (New Zealand) M Venus	6	6

Final
1	(Germany) K Krawietz (Romania) H Tecău	3	7^{7}	[8]
2	(Germany) T Pütz (New Zealand) M Venus	6	6^{3}	[10]

== Qualifying ==
=== Seeds ===
1. (Philippines) Ruben Gonzales / (United States) Hunter Johnson (qualifying competition; lucky losers)
2. (Italy) Alessandro Giannessi / (Spain) Carlos Taberner (qualified)

=== Qualifiers ===
1. (Italy) Alessandro Giannessi / (Spain) Carlos Taberner

=== Lucky losers ===
1. (Philippines) Ruben Gonzales / (United States) Hunter Johnson

=== Qualifying draw ===
First round
1	(Philippines) Ruben Gonzales (United States) Hunter Johnson	6	6
WC	(Spain) Nicola Kuhn (Germany) Lewie Lane	1	2
(United States) Jack Vance (United States) Tennyson Whiting	6^{6}	6	[6]
2	(Italy) Alessandro Giannessi (Spain) Carlos Taberner	7^{8}	2	[10]

Qualifying competition
1	(Philippines) Ruben Gonzales (United States) Hunter Johnson	6	5	[8]
2	(Italy) Alessandro Giannessi (Spain) Carlos Taberner	3	7	[10]
