= 2001 Betty Barclay Cup =

- Date: 1 – 6 May
- Edition: 17th
- Category: Tier II
- Draw: 28S / 16D
- Prize money: $565,000
- Surface: Clay / outdoor
- Location: Hamburg, Germany
- Venue: Am Rothenbaum

Champions

Singles
- (United States) Venus Williams

Doubles
- (Zimbabwe) Cara Black / (Russia) Elena Likhovtseva
← 2000 ·	WTA Hamburg	· 2002 →

The 2001 Betty Barclay Cup was a women's tennis tournament played on outdoor clay courts at Am Rothenbaum in Hamburg, Germany and was part of Tier II of the 2001 WTA Tour. It was the 17th edition of the tournament and was held from 1 May until 6 May 2001. First-seeded Venus Williams won the singles title and earned $90,000 first-prize money.

== Finals ==
=== Singles ===
(United States) Venus Williams defeated (United States) Meghann Shaughnessy 6–3, 6–0

- It was Williams' 3rd title of the year and the 25th of her career.

=== Doubles ===
(Zimbabwe) Cara Black / (Russia) Elena Likhovtseva defeated (Czech Republic) Květa Hrdličková / (Germany) Barbara Rittner 6–2, 4–6, 6–2

- It was Black's 2nd title of the year and the 3rd of her career. It was Likhovtseva's 2nd title of the year and the 11th of her career.
