= 2001 Betty Barclay Cup – Doubles =

Doubles
- 2001 Betty Barclay Cup

Final
- Champions: (Zimbabwe) Cara Black (Russia) Elena Likhovtseva
- Runners-up: (Czech Republic) Květa Hrdličková (Germany) Barbara Rittner
- Score: 6–2, 4–6, 6–2

Details
- Draw: 16
- Seeds: 4

Events
Singles	Doubles
← 2000 ·	Hamburg European Open	· 2002 →

Anna Kournikova and Natasha Zvereva were the defending champions but did not compete that year.

Cara Black and Elena Likhovtseva won in the final 6–2, 4–6, 6–2 against Květa Hrdličková and Barbara Rittner.

== Seeds ==
Champion seeds are indicated in bold text while text in italics indicates the round in which those seeds were eliminated.

1. (Zimbabwe) **Cara Black** / (Russia) **Elena Likhovtseva (champions)**
2. (Spain) Arantxa Sánchez-Vicario / (Spain) Magüi Serna (quarterfinals)
3. (Italy) Tathiana Garbin / (Slovakia) Janette Husárová (semifinals)
4. (South Africa) Liezel Huber / (Argentina) Laura Montalvo (first round)

== Draw ==
Key

- Q = Qualifier
- WC = Wild card
- LL = Lucky loser
- Alt = Alternate
- ITF = ITF entry
- PR = Protected ranking
- SR = Special ranking
- SE = Special exempt
- JE = Junior exempt
- JR = Junior Accelerator Programme entrant
- CO = College Accelerator Programme entrant
- NG = Next Gen Accelerator Program entrant
- w/o = Walkover
- r = Retired
- d = Defaulted

First round
1	(Zimbabwe) **C Black** (Russia) **E Likhovtseva**	**6**	**6**
(Germany) B Lamade (Switzerland) P Schnyder	3	2
(Argentina) P Tarabini (Netherlands) C Vis	3	2
(Federal Republic of Yugoslavia) **J Dokić** (Spain) **C Martínez**	**6**	**6**
3	(Italy) **T Garbin** (Slovakia) **J Husárová**	2	**6**	**6**
(South Africa) K Grant (Netherlands) S Noorlander	**6**	3	0
WC	(Germany) A Glass (Germany) J Kandarr	6^{5}	**6**	4
Q	(Germany) **A Barna** (Germany) **V Henke**	**7^{7}**	4	**6**
(Czech Republic) **K Hrdličková** (Germany) **B Rittner**	4	**6**	**6**
(Romania) R Dragomir Ilie (Italy) S Farina Elia	**6**	1	3
(Belgium) **J Henin** (United States) **M Shaughnessy**	**6**	3	**6**
4	(South Africa) L Huber (Argentina) L Montalvo	4	**6**	2
(France) **A-G Sidot** (Ukraine) **E Tatarkova**	**6**	**6**
(Czech Republic) E Martincová (Germany) E Wagner	4	1
(Bulgaria) L Bacheva (Bulgaria) M Maleeva	**6**	3	4
2	(Spain) **A Sánchez-Vicario** (Spain) **M Serna**	2	**6**	**6**

Quarterfinals
1	(Zimbabwe) **C Black** (Russia) **E Likhovtseva**	**7**	**6**
(Federal Republic of Yugoslavia) J Dokić (Spain) C Martínez	5	3
3	(Italy) **T Garbin** (Slovakia) **J Husárová**	**6**	**6**
Q	(Germany) A Barna (Germany) V Henke	4	4
(Czech Republic) **K Hrdličková** (Germany) **B Rittner**	**7**	6^{6}	**6**
(Belgium) J Henin (United States) M Shaughnessy	5	**7^{8}**	4
(France) **A-G Sidot** (Ukraine) **E Tatarkova**	**6**	**6**
2	(Spain) A Sánchez-Vicario (Spain) M Serna	1	1

Semifinals
1	(Zimbabwe) **C Black** (Russia) **E Likhovtseva**	**6**	**7**
3	(Italy) T Garbin (Slovakia) J Husárová	3	5
(Czech Republic) **K Hrdličková** (Germany) **B Rittner**	**6**	**6**
(France) A-G Sidot (Ukraine) E Tatarkova	1	2

Final
1	(Zimbabwe) **Cara Black** (Russia) **Elena Likhovtseva**	**6**	4	**6**
(Czech Republic) Květa Hrdličková (Germany) Barbara Rittner	2	**6**	2
