= 2021 Hamburg European Open – Men's singles =

European Tennis competition

Men's singles
- 2021 Hamburg European Open

Final
- Champion: (Spain) Pablo Carreño Busta
- Runner-up: (Serbia) Filip Krajinović
- Score: 6–2, 6–4

Details
- Draw: 28 (6Q / 4WC)
- Seeds: 8

Events
Singles	men	women
Doubles	men	women
← 2020 ·	Hamburg European Open	· 2022 →

Andrey Rublev was the defending champion, but chose to not defend his title as he and other Russian Olympic athletes were sent to Yuzhno-Sakhalinsk for training sessions.

Pablo Carreño Busta won his maiden ATP Tour 500 singles title, defeating Filip Krajinović in the final, 6–2, 6–4.

== Seeds ==
The top four seeds received a bye into the second round.

1. (Greece) Stefanos Tsitsipas (quarterfinals)
2. (Spain) Pablo Carreño Busta (champion)
3. (Georgia (country)) Nikoloz Basilashvili (quarterfinals)
4. (Spain) Albert Ramos Viñolas (second round)
5. (Serbia) Dušan Lajović (quarterfinals)
6. (Serbia) Filip Krajinović (final)
7. (Germany) Jan-Lennard Struff (first round)
8. (France) Benoît Paire (quarterfinals)

== Draw ==
=== Key ===
- Q = Qualifier
- WC = Wild card
- LL = Lucky loser
- Alt = Alternate
- SE = Special exempt
- PR = Protected ranking
- ITF = ITF entry
- JE = Junior exempt
- w/o = Walkover
- r = Retired
- d = Defaulted
- SR = Special ranking

=== Finals ===
Semifinals
6	(Serbia) Filip Krajinović	6	6
(Serbia) Laslo Đere	4	2
(Argentina) Federico Delbonis	6^{2}	3
2	(Spain) Pablo Carreño Busta	7^{7}	6

Final
6	(Serbia) Filip Krajinović	2	4
2	(Spain) Pablo Carreño Busta	6	6

=== Top half ===
First round
Q	(Germany) M Marterer	6^{2}	6	6^{4}
(Germany) D Koepfer	7^{7}	2	7^{7}
(Spain) J Munar	6^{5}	4
WC	(Germany) P Kohlschreiber	7^{7}	6
WC	(Germany) D Altmaier	3	7^{7}	1
6	(Serbia) F Krajinović	6	6^{3}	6
(France) C Moutet	1	2
LL	(Argentina) S Báez	6	6
WC	(Spain) N Kuhn	6	1	2
Q	(Brazil) T Seyboth Wild	1	6	6
(Serbia) L Đere	6	7
7	(Germany) J-L Struff	4	5

Second round
1/WC	(Greece) S Tsitsipas	7^{7}	6
(Germany) D Koepfer	6^{2}	3
WC	(Germany) P Kohlschreiber	5	6	3
6	(Serbia) F Krajinović	7	4	6
3	(Georgia (country)) N Basilashvili	w/o
LL	(Argentina) S Báez
Q	(Brazil) T Seyboth Wild	6^{1}	1
(Serbia) L Đere	7^{7}	6

Quarterfinals
1/WC	(Greece) S Tsitsipas	6	1	3
6	(Serbia) F Krajinović	3	6	6
3	(Georgia (country)) N Basilashvili	2	2
(Serbia) L Đere	6	6

Semifinals
6	(Serbia) F Krajinović	6	6
(Serbia) L Đere	4	2

=== Bottom half ===
First round
8	(France) B Paire	6
(Lithuania) R Berankis	6^{r}
Q	(Peru) JP Varillas	6	6
LL	(India) S Nagal	0	4
(Argentina) F Delbonis	6	5	6
Q	(China) Zh Zhang	1	7	4
5	(Serbia) D Lajović	6	6
(France) L Pouille	4	4
(Italy) G Mager	6	4	6^{3}
Q	(Slovakia) A Molčan	4	6	7^{7}
Q	(Spain) C Taberner	6	3	6
(Spain) F López	4	6	3

Second round
8	(France) B Paire	7	7^{10}
Q	(Peru) JP Varillas	5	6^{8}
(Argentina) F Delbonis	6	7^{7}
4	(Spain) A Ramos Viñolas	3	6^{4}
5	(Serbia) D Lajović	6	6^{2}	6
Q	(Slovakia) A Molčan	4	7^{7}	3
Q	(Spain) C Taberner	5	3
2	(Spain) P Carreño Busta	7	6

Quarterfinals
8	(France) B Paire	6	6^{9}	4
(Argentina) F Delbonis	4	7^{11}	6
5	(Serbia) D Lajović	6^{4}	3
2	(Spain) P Carreño Busta	7^{7}	6

Semifinals
(Argentina) F Delbonis	6^{2}	3
2	(Spain) P Carreño Busta	7^{7}	6

== Qualifying ==
=== Seeds ===
1. (Spain) Carlos Taberner (qualified)
2. (Brazil) Thiago Seyboth Wild (qualified)
3. (Slovakia) Jozef Kovalík (first round)
4. (Bosnia and Herzegovina) Damir Džumhur (first round)
5. (Australia) Christopher O'Connell (qualifying competition)
6. (Peru) Juan Pablo Varillas (qualified)
7. (India) Sumit Nagal (qualifying competition; Lucky loser)
8. (Germany) Oscar Otte (first round)
9. (Slovakia) Alex Molčan (qualified)
10. (Argentina) Sebastián Báez (qualifying competition; Lucky loser)
11. (Italy) Alessandro Giannessi (qualifying competition)
12. (Serbia) Danilo Petrović (first round)

=== Qualifiers ===
1. (Spain) Carlos Taberner
2. (Brazil) Thiago Seyboth Wild
3. (China) Zhang Zhizhen
4. (Germany) Maximilian Marterer
5. (Slovakia) Alex Molčan
6. (Peru) Juan Pablo Varillas

=== Lucky losers ===
1. (India) Sumit Nagal
2. (Argentina) Sebastián Báez

=== Qualifying draw ===
==== First qualifier ====
First round
1	(Spain) Carlos Taberner	6	6
WC	(Germany) Niklas Guttau	1	2
(Germany) Daniel Masur	2	6	6
12	(Serbia) Danilo Petrović	6	4	3

Qualifying competition
1	(Spain) Carlos Taberner	2	7^{7}	6
(Germany) Daniel Masur	6	6^{5}	4

==== Second qualifier ====
First round
2	(Brazil) Thiago Seyboth Wild	6	6
WC	(Germany) Mats Rosenkranz	3	1
(Canada) Steven Diez	6	6
8	(Germany) Oscar Otte	4	4

Qualifying competition
2	(Brazil) Thiago Seyboth Wild	6	7
(Canada) Steven Diez	3	5

==== Third qualifier ====
First round
3	(Slovakia) Jozef Kovalík	4	4
(China) Zhang Zhizhen	6	6
WC	(Germany) Lewie Lane	3	1
7	(India) Sumit Nagal	6	6

Qualifying competition
(China) Zhang Zhizhen	6	6
7	(India) Sumit Nagal	4	2

==== Fourth qualifier ====
First round
4	(Bosnia and Herzegovina) Damir Džumhur	7	2	3
(Germany) Maximilian Marterer	5	6	6
(Germany) Tobias Kamke	3	4
11	(Italy) Alessandro Giannessi	6	6

Qualifying competition
(Germany) Maximilian Marterer	3	6	7
11	(Italy) Alessandro Giannessi	6	3	5

==== Fifth qualifier ====
First round
5	(Australia) Christopher O'Connell	6	6
(Latvia) Ernests Gulbis	3	0
(Slovakia) Filip Horanský	6^{5}	2
9	(Slovakia) Alex Molčan	7^{7}	6

Qualifying competition
5	(Australia) Christopher O'Connell	3	7	3
9	(Slovakia) Alex Molčan	6	5	6

==== Sixth qualifier ====
First round
6	(Peru) Juan Pablo Varillas	7	6
(Czech Republic) Jonáš Forejtek	5	2
(Germany) Rudolf Molleker	5	2
10	(Argentina) Sebastián Báez	7	6

Qualifying competition
6	(Peru) Juan Pablo Varillas	6	3	7^{7}
10	(Argentina) Sebastián Báez	2	6	6^{0}
