= Lisa Matviyenko =

German tennis player

- Country (sports): Germany
- Born: 6 October 1997 (age 28)
- Plays: Right-handed (two-handed backhand)
- Prize money: $44,073

Singles
- Career record: 185–132
- Career titles: 3 ITF
- Highest ranking: No. 420 (7 May 2018)

Doubles
- Career record: 27–57
- Career titles: 0
- Highest ranking: No. 659 (7 May 2018)
- Last updated on: 11 January 2023.

Lisa Matviyenko (born 6 October 1997) is an inactive German tennis player. Eva Lys is her younger sister, and also a tennis player.

Matviyenko made her WTA Tour main-draw debut at the 2021 Hamburg European Open in the doubles competition where she and partner Sina Herrmann lost to Astra Sharma and Rosalie van der Hoek.
