= 2016 BFD Energy Challenger =

- Date: 26 September – 2 October
- Edition: 2nd
- Draw: 32S / 16D
- Prize money: €42,500 + H
- Surface: Clay
- Location: Rome, Italy

Champions

Singles
- (Czech Republic) Jan Šátral

Doubles
- (Italy) Federico Gaio / (Italy) Stefano Napolitano
← 2015 ·	BFD Energy Challenger	· 2017 →

The 2016 BFD Energy Challenger was a professional tennis tournament played on clay courts. It was the second edition of the tournament which was part of the 2016 ATP Challenger Tour. It took place in Rome, Italy between 26 September and 2 October 2016.

== Singles main-draw entrants ==
=== Seeds ===
Country	Player	Rank^{1}	Seed
NED	Robin Haase	65	1
CZE	Adam Pavlásek	80	2
GBR	Aljaž Bedene	82	3
ESP	Daniel Gimeno Traver	118	4
SVK	Andrej Martin	127	5
NED	Thiemo de Bakker	143	6
ESP	Rubén Ramírez Hidalgo	148	7
HUN	Márton Fucsovics	150	8

- ^{1} Rankings are as of September 19, 2016.

=== Other entrants ===
The following players received wild cards into the singles main draw:

- (Italy) Stefano Napolitano
- (Italy) Gianluigi Quinzi
- (Italy) Andrea Pellegrino
- (Italy) Stefano Pontoglio

The following players received entry from the qualifying draw:

- (Austria) Gibril Diarra
- (France) Maxime Janvier
- (Italy) Gianluca Mager
- (Sweden) Mikael Ymer

== Champions ==
=== Singles ===
- (Czech Republic) Jan Šátral def. (Netherlands) Robin Haase, 6–3, 6–2

=== Doubles ===
- (Italy) Federico Gaio / (Italy) Stefano Napolitano def. (Croatia) Marin Draganja / (Croatia) Tomislav Draganja, 6–7^{(2–7)}, 6–2, [10–3]
