= 2000 Betty Barclay Cup =

- Date: 2–7 May
- Edition: 16th
- Category: Tier II
- Draw: 28S / 16D
- Prize money: $535,000
- Surface: Clay / outdoor
- Location: Hamburg, Germany
- Venue: Am Rothenbaum

Champions

Singles
- (Switzerland) Martina Hingis

Doubles
- (Russia) Anna Kournikova / (Belarus) Natasha Zvereva
← 1999 ·	WTA Hamburg	· 2001 →

The 2000 Betty Barclay Cup was a women's tennis tournament played on outdoor clay courts at Am Rothenbaum in Hamburg, Germany and was part of the Tier II category of the 2000 WTA Tour. It was the 16th edition of the tournament and was held from 2 May until 7 May 2000. First-seeded Martina Hingis won the singles title and earned $87,000 first-prize money.

== Finals ==
=== Singles ===
(Switzerland) Martina Hingis defeated (Spain) Arantxa Sánchez Vicario 6–3, 6–3

- It was Hingis' 3rd singles title of the year and the 29th of her career.

=== Doubles ===
(Russia) Anna Kournikova / (Belarus) Natasha Zvereva defeated (United States) Nicole Arendt / (Netherlands) Manon Bollegraf 6–7^{(5–7)}, 6–2, 6–4
