= 2000 Betty Barclay Cup – Doubles =

Doubles
- 2000 Betty Barclay Cup

Final
- Champions: (Russia) Anna Kournikova (Belarus) Natasha Zvereva
- Runners-up: (United States) Nicole Arendt (Netherlands) Manon Bollegraf
- Score: 6–7^{(5–7)}, 6–2, 6–4

Details
- Draw: 16 (1WC/1Q/1LL)
- Seeds: 4

Events
Singles	Doubles
← 1999 ·	WTA Hamburg	· 2001 →

Larisa Neiland and Arantxa Sánchez Vicario were the defending champions, but Neiland did not compete this year. Sánchez Vicario teamed up with Laurence Courtois and lost in semifinals to Nicole Arendt and Manon Bollegraf.

Anna Kournikova and Natasha Zvereva won the title by defeating Arendt and Bollegraf 6–7^{(5–7)}, 6–2, 6–4 in the final.

== Seeds ==
1. (Russia) Anna Kournikova / (Belarus) Natasha Zvereva (champions)
2. (Belgium) Laurence Courtois / (Spain) Arantxa Sánchez Vicario (semifinals)
3. (Argentina) Laura Montalvo / (Argentina) Patricia Tarabini (first round)
4. (France) Anne-Gaëlle Sidot / (Netherlands) Caroline Vis (first round)

== Draw ==
Key

- Q = Qualifier
- WC = Wild card
- LL = Lucky loser
- Alt = Alternate
- ITF = ITF entry
- PR = Protected ranking
- SR = Special ranking
- SE = Special exempt
- JE = Junior exempt
- JR = Junior Accelerator Programme entrant
- CO = College Accelerator Programme entrant
- NG = Next Gen Accelerator Program entrant
- w/o = Walkover
- r = Retired
- d = Defaulted

=== Draw ===
First round
1	(Russia) A Kournikova (Belarus) N Zvereva	6	6
(Germany) A Bachmann (Belarus) T Poutchek	1	1
(Belgium) S Appelmans (South Africa) A Coetzer	6^{4}	1
(Romania) C Cristea (Romania) R Dragomir	7^{7}	6
4	(France) AG Sidot (Netherlands) C Vis	0	6	3
(Bulgaria) L Bacheva (Netherlands) A Hopmans	6	4	6
Q	(Germany) G Arn (Germany) B Lamade	6	5	4
LL	(Argentina) M Díaz Oliva (Bulgaria) P Nola	2	7	6
(Spain) E Bes (Spain) G Riera	6	4	7^{11}
WC	(Germany) A Glass (Germany) E Wagner	3	6	6^{9}
(United States) N Arendt (Netherlands) M Bollegraf	6	6
3	(Argentina) L Montalvo (Argentina) P Tarabini	4	1
(Slovakia) J Husárová (Netherlands) S Noorlander	6	7
(Austria) K Kschwendt (Australia) B Stewart	2	5
(Czech Republic) K Hrdličková (Germany) B Rittner	6^{5}	6	4
2	(Belgium) L Courtois (Spain) A Sánchez Vicario	7^{7}	3	6

Quarterfinals
1	(Russia) A Kournikova (Belarus) N Zvereva	6	6
(Romania) C Cristea (Romania) R Dragomir	2	4
(Bulgaria) L Bacheva (Netherlands) A Hopmans	6	3	6
LL	(Argentina) M Díaz Oliva (Bulgaria) P Nola	2	6	1
(Spain) E Bes (Spain) G Riera	2	4
(United States) N Arendt (Netherlands) M Bollegraf	6	6
(Slovakia) J Husárová (Netherlands) S Noorlander	2	6^{7}
2	(Belgium) L Courtois (Spain) A Sánchez Vicario	6	7^{9}

Semifinals
1	(Russia) A Kournikova (Belarus) N Zvereva	6	6
(Bulgaria) L Bacheva (Netherlands) A Hopmans	2	1
(United States) N Arendt (Netherlands) M Bollegraf	6	4	7^{7}
2	(Belgium) L Courtois (Spain) A Sánchez Vicario	2	6	6^{4}

Final
1	(Russia) A Kournikova (Belarus) N Zvereva	6^{5}	6	6
(United States) N Arendt (Netherlands) M Bollegraf	7^{7}	2	4
