= 2015 BFD Energy Challenger – Doubles =

Doubles
- 2015 BFD Energy Challenger

Final
- Champions: (Poland) Tomasz Bednarek (Poland) Mateusz Kowalczyk
- Runners-up: (Spain) Íñigo Cervantes (Netherlands) Mark Vervoort
- Score: 6–2, 6–1

Events
Singles	Doubles
- BFD Energy Challenger

The 2015 BFD Energy Challenger was a professional tennis tournament played on clay courts. It was the first edition of the tournament which was part of the 2015 ATP Challenger Tour. It took place in Rome, Italy between 28 September and 4 October 2015.

== Seeds ==
1. (Croatia) Dino Marcan / (Croatia) Antonio Šančić (first round)
2. (Slovakia) Andrej Martin / (Italy) Alessandro Motti (first round)
3. (Serbia) Ilija Bozoljac / (Italy) Flavio Cipolla (semifinals)
4. (Poland) Tomasz Bednarek / (Poland) Mateusz Kowalczyk (champions)

== Draw ==
Key

- Q = Qualifier
- WC = Wild card
- LL = Lucky loser
- Alt = Alternate
- ITF = ITF entry
- PR = Protected ranking
- SR = Special ranking
- SE = Special exempt
- JE = Junior exempt
- JR = Junior Accelerator Programme entrant
- CO = College Accelerator Programme entrant
- NG = Next Gen Accelerator Program entrant
- w/o = Walkover
- r = Retired
- d = Defaulted

First round
1	(Croatia) D Marcan (Croatia) A Šančić	2	6^{5}
WC	(Italy) M Cecchinato (Italy) G Di Meo	6	7^{7}
(Spain) Í Cervantes (Netherlands) M Vervoort	6	7^{7}
(Argentina) P Cachin (Spain) R Carballés Baena	4	6^{5}
3	(Serbia) I Bozoljac (Italy) F Cipolla	6	6
(Italy) L Giustino (Spain) D Pérez Sanz	3	4
WC	(Italy) Lorenzo Abbruciati (Italy) Federico Teodori	3	4
(Spain) E López-Pérez (Serbia) Ilija Vučić	6	6
(Italy) G Naso (Italy) M Viola	3	0
(Italy) F Gaio (Italy) A Giannessi	6	6
(Italy) S Caruso (Italy) Matteo Volante	3	4
4	(Poland) T Bednarek (Poland) M Kowalczyk	6	6
WC	(Italy) F Baldi (Italy) M Berrettini	2	6^{6}
(Italy) R Bonadio (Italy) Pietro Rondoni	6	7^{8}
(Italy) R Ghedin (Belarus) U Ignatik	7	6
2	(Slovakia) A Martin (Italy) A Motti	5	3

Quarterfinals
WC	(Italy) M Cecchinato (Italy) G Di Meo	6^{5}	2
(Spain) Í Cervantes (Netherlands) M Vervoort	7^{7}	6
3	(Serbia) I Bozoljac (Italy) F Cipolla	6	3	[10]
(Spain) E López-Pérez (Serbia) I Vučić	4	6	[6]
(Italy) F Gaio (Italy) A Giannessi	1	1
4	(Poland) T Bednarek (Poland) M Kowalczyk	6	6
(Italy) R Bonadio (Italy) P Rondoni	3	2
(Italy) R Ghedin (Belarus) U Ignatik	6	6

Semifinals
(Spain) Í Cervantes (Netherlands) M Vervoort	6	6
3	(Serbia) I Bozoljac (Italy) F Cipolla	3	4
4	(Poland) T Bednarek (Poland) M Kowalczyk	6	6
(Italy) R Ghedin (Belarus) U Ignatik	2	4

Finals
(Spain) Í Cervantes (Netherlands) M Vervoort	2	1
4	(Poland) T Bednarek (Poland) M Kowalczyk	6	6
