= Sina Herrmann =

German tennis player (born 2001)

- Country (sports): Germany
- Born: 24 October 2001 (age 24) Karlsruhe, Germany
- Plays: Right-handed (two-handed backhand)
- Prize money: US $61,059

Singles
- Career record: 175–166
- Career titles: 4 ITF
- Highest ranking: No. 424 (19 September 2022)
- Current ranking: No. 912 (17 November 2025)

Doubles
- Career record: 30–44
- Career titles: 3 ITF
- Highest ranking: No. 666 (14 November 2022)
- Current ranking: No. 1499 (17 November 2025)
- Last updated on: 19 November 2025.

Sina Herrmann (born 24 October 2001) is a German tennis player.

She has a career-high WTA singles ranking of world No. 424, achieved in September 2022, and a best doubles ranking of No. 666, reached in November 2022.

Herrmann made her WTA Tour main-draw debut at the 2021 Hamburg European Open in the doubles competition where she and partner Lisa Matviyenko lost to Astra Sharma and Rosalie van der Hoek in the first round.

== ITF Circuit finals ==
=== Singles: 5 (4 titles, 1 runner-up) ===
Legend
W25 tournaments (1–0)
W15 tournaments (3–1)

Result	W–L	Date	Tournament	Tier	Surface	Opponent	Score
Loss	0–1	Aug 2019	ITF Haren, Netherlands	W15	Clay	(France) Salma Djoubri	1–6, 0–6
Win	1–1	Sep 2020	ITF Grado, Italy	W25	Clay	(Belgium) Lara Salden	6–4, 7–5
Win	2–1	Oct 2020	ITF Monastir, Tunisia	W15	Hard	(Chile) Bárbara Gatica	6–4, 6–4
Win	3–1	Sep 2022	ITF Haren, Netherlands	W15	Clay	(Netherlands) Anouk Koevermans	7–5, 5–7, 6–3
Win	4–1	Jun 2024	ITF Bol, Croatia	W15	Clay	(Poland) Weronika Ewald	7–5, 6–4

=== Doubles: 4 (3 titles, 1 runner-up) ===
Legend
W25 tournaments (0–1)
W15 tournaments (3–0)

Result	W–L	Date	Tournament	Tier	Surface	Partner	Opponents	Score
Win	1–0	Mar 2020	ITF Monastir, Tunisia	W15	Hard	(Romania) Andreea Prisăcariu	(Spain) Yvonne Cavallé Reimers (Serbia) Bojana Marinković	1–6, 6–3, [10–4]
Win	2–0	Mar 2021	ITF Antalya, Turkey	W15	Clay	(South Korea) Jang Su-jeong	(Czech Republic) Anastasia Dețiuc (Czech Republic) Darja Viďmanová	w/o
Loss	2–1	Jan 2024	ITF Petit-Bourg, Guadeloupe, France	W25	Hard	(Germany) Antonia Schmidt	(Switzerland) Jenny Dürst (Sweden) Fanny Östlund	2–6, 5–7
Win	3–1	May 2024	ITF Varberg, Sweden	W15	Clay	(Poland) Marcelina Podlinska	(Sweden) Ida Johansson (Sweden) Jacquline Nylander Altelius	6–4, 6–1
