= 2000 Betty Barclay Cup – Singles =

Singles
- 2000 Betty Barclay Cup

Final
- Champion: (Switzerland) Martina Hingis
- Runner-up: (Spain) Arantxa Sánchez Vicario
- Score: 6–3, 6–3

Details
- Draw: 28 (3WC/4Q/2LL)
- Seeds: 8

Events
Singles	Doubles
- WTA Hamburg

Venus Williams was the defending champion, but lost in quarterfinals to Amanda Coetzer.

Martina Hingis won the title by defeating Arantxa Sánchez Vicario 6–3, 6–3 in the final.

== Seeds ==
The first four seeds received a bye into the second round.

1. (Switzerland) Martina Hingis (champion)
2. (United States) Venus Williams (quarterfinals)
3. (Spain) Conchita Martínez (quarterfinals)
4. (Spain) Arantxa Sánchez Vicario (final)
5. (Austria) Barbara Schett (first round, retired)
6. (Russia) Anna Kournikova (quarterfinals)
7. (Germany) Anke Huber (semifinals)
8. (South Africa) Amanda Coetzer (semifinals)

== Draw ==
Key

- Q = Qualifier
- WC = Wild card
- LL = Lucky loser
- Alt = Alternate
- ITF = ITF entry
- PR = Protected ranking
- SR = Special ranking
- SE = Special exempt
- JE = Junior exempt
- JR = Junior Accelerator Programme entrant
- CO = College Accelerator Programme entrant
- NG = Next Gen Accelerator Program entrant
- w/o = Walkover
- r = Retired
- d = Defaulted

=== Finals ===
Semifinals
1	(Switzerland) Martina Hingis	6	6
7	(Germany) Anke Huber	3	2
4	(Spain) Arantxa Sánchez Vicario	6	4	7^{7}
8/WC	(South Africa) Amanda Coetzer	3	6	6^{4}

Final
1	(Switzerland) Martina Hingis	6	6
4	(Spain) Arantxa Sánchez Vicario	3	3

=== Top half ===
First round
(Austria) S Plischke	6	4	6
LL	(Netherlands) S Noorlander	4	6	1
Q	(Netherlands) A Hopmans	0	5
(France) S Pitkowski	6	7
(Israel) A Smashnova	3	2
6	(Russia) A Kournikova	6	6
Q	(Bulgaria) L Bacheva	6	6
Q	(Bulgaria) P Nola	3	3
Q	(Argentina) M Díaz Oliva	3	6^{6}
(Belgium) S Appelmans	6	7^{8}
(Czech Republic) D Chládková	3	6	0
7	(Germany) A Huber	6	4	6

Second round
1	(Switzerland) M Hingis	6	6
(Austria) S Plischke	4	1
(France) S Pitkowski	3	0
6	(Russia) A Kournikova	6	6
3	(Spain) C Martínez	6	5	6
Q	(Bulgaria) L Bacheva	4	7	4
(Belgium) S Appelmans	1	3
7	(Germany) A Huber	6	6

Quarterfinals
1	(Switzerland) M Hingis	3	6	6
6	(Russia) A Kournikova	6	2	4
3	(Spain) C Martínez	7^{8}	6^{4}	2
7	(Germany) A Huber	6^{6}	7^{7}	6

Semifinals
1	(Switzerland) M Hingis	6	6
7	(Germany) A Huber	3	2

=== Bottom half ===
First round
5	(Austria) B Schett	3	0^{r}
(Russia) T Panova	6	1
WC	(Germany) A Glass	6	1	6
(Luxembourg) A Kremer	2	6	4
(Switzerland) P Schnyder	4	6	6^{7}
LL	(Spain) M Serna	6	1	7^{9}
8/WC	(South Africa) A Coetzer	6	6
(Romania) R Dragomir	0	4
WC	(Germany) M Weingärtner	7	2	6^{3}
(France) AG Sidot	5	6	7^{7}
(Romania) I Spîrlea	6	6
(Belarus) N Zvereva	2	3

Second round
(Russia) T Panova	6^{5}	3
WC	(Germany) A Glass	7^{7}	6
LL	(Spain) M Serna	3	6^{3}
4	(Spain) A Sánchez Vicario	6	7^{7}
8/WC	(South Africa) A Coetzer	6	6
(France) AG Sidot	2	4
(Romania) I Spîrlea	7^{7}	2	2
2	(United States) V Williams	6^{4}	6	6

Quarterfinals
WC	(Germany) A Glass	3	3
4	(Spain) A Sánchez Vicario	6	6
8/WC	(South Africa) A Coetzer	6	6
2	(United States) V Williams	3	4

Semifinals
4	(Spain) A Sánchez Vicario	6	4	7^{7}
8/WC	(South Africa) A Coetzer	3	6	6^{4}
