= 2021 Hamburg European Open =

- Date: 6–11 July (women); 12–18 July (men)
- Edition: 115th (men); 19th (women)
- Category: ATP 500 (men); WTA 250 (women)
- Draw: 28S / 16D (men); 28S / 16D (women)
- Prize money: €1,030,900 (men) $235,238 (women)
- Surface: Clay
- Location: Hamburg, Germany
- Venue: Am Rothenbaum

Champions

Men's singles
- (Spain) Pablo Carreño Busta

Women's singles
- (Romania) Elena-Gabriela Ruse

Men's doubles
- (Germany) Tim Pütz / (New Zealand) Michael Venus

Women's doubles
- (Italy) Jasmine Paolini / (Switzerland) Jil Teichmann
- Hamburg European Open

The 2021 Hamburg European Open was a combined men's and women's tennis tournament played on outdoor clay courts. It was the 115th edition of the event for the men and the 19th edition for the women, after last tournament being held in 2002. The tournament was classified as a WTA 250 tournament on the 2021 WTA Tour and as an ATP Tour 500 series on the 2021 ATP Tour (called the Hamburg Open). The tournament took place at the Am Rothenbaum in Hamburg, Germany between 6 and 18 July 2021. The event was scheduled a week earlier than the usual late July date to avoid scheduling conflicts with the 2020 Summer Olympics.

== Finals ==
=== Men's singles ===
- (Spain) Pablo Carreño Busta defeated (Serbia) Filip Krajinović, 6–2, 6–4

=== Women's singles ===
- (Romania) Elena-Gabriela Ruse defeated (Germany) Andrea Petkovic, 7–6^{(8–6)}, 6–4

This was Ruse's maiden WTA Tour singles title.

=== Men's doubles ===
- (Germany) Tim Pütz / (New Zealand) Michael Venus defeated (Germany) Kevin Krawietz / (Romania) Horia Tecău 6–3, 6–7^{(3–7)}, [10–8].

=== Women's doubles ===
- (Italy) Jasmine Paolini / (Switzerland) Jil Teichmann defeated (Australia) Astra Sharma / (Netherlands) Rosalie van der Hoek 6–0, 6–4

== Points and prize money ==
=== Points distribution ===
Event	W	F	SF	QF	Round of 16	Round of 32	Round of 64	Q	Q2	Q1
Singles	500	300	180	90	45	20	0	10	4	0
Doubles	500	300	180	90	0	—N/a	—N/a	45	25	0

=== Prize money ===
Event	W	F	SF	QF	Round of 16	Round of 32	Q2	Q1
Singles	€96,035	€71,000	€50,600	€34,500	€21,730	€12,650	€5,850	€3,100
Doubles*	€33,180	€24,970	€17,960	€11,820	€7,450	—N/a	—N/a	—N/a

_{*per team}

== ATP singles main draw entrants ==
=== Seeds ===
Country	Player	Rank^{1}	Seed
GRE	Stefanos Tsitsipas	4	1
ESP	Pablo Carreño Busta	13	2
GEO	Nikoloz Basilashvili	28	3
ESP	Albert Ramos Viñolas	39	4
SRB	Dušan Lajović	42	5
SRB	Filip Krajinović	44	6
GER	Jan-Lennard Struff	45	7
FRA	Benoît Paire	46	8

- ^{1} Rankings are as of 28 June 2021.

=== Other entrants ===
The following players received wildcards into the main draw:

- (Germany) Daniel Altmaier
- (Germany) Philipp Kohlschreiber
- (Spain) Nicola Kuhn
- (Greece) Stefanos Tsitsipas

The following players received entry from the qualifying draw:

- (Germany) Maximilian Marterer
- (Slovakia) Alex Molčan
- (Brazil) Thiago Seyboth Wild
- (Spain) Carlos Taberner
- (Peru) Juan Pablo Varillas
- (China) Zhang Zhizhen

The following players received entry as lucky losers:

- (Argentina) Sebastián Báez
- (India) Sumit Nagal

=== Withdrawals ===
Before the tournament

- (Spain) Pablo Andújar → replaced by (India) Sumit Nagal
- (Canada) Félix Auger-Aliassime → replaced by (France) Lucas Pouille
- (Slovenia) Aljaž Bedene → replaced by (Argentina) Sebastián Báez
- (Hungary) Márton Fucsovics → replaced by (Italy) Gianluca Mager
- (Russia) Aslan Karatsev → replaced by (France) Corentin Moutet
- (Italy) Lorenzo Sonego → replaced by (Lithuania) Ričardas Berankis

== ATP doubles main draw entrants ==
=== Seeds ===
Country	Player	Country	Player	Rank^{1}	Seed
GER	Kevin Krawietz	ROU	Horia Tecău	41	1
GER	Tim Pütz	NZL	Michael Venus	55	2
NED	Matwé Middelkoop	MON	Hugo Nys	83	3
BIH	Tomislav Brkić	SRB	Nikola Ćaćić	102	4

- ^{1} Rankings are as of 28 June 2021.

=== Other entrants ===
The following pairs received wildcards into the doubles main draw:

- (Germany) Daniel Altmaier / (Germany) Rudolf Molleker
- (Greece) Petros Tsitsipas / (Greece) Stefanos Tsitsipas

The following pair received entry using protected ranking:

- ~~(Lithuania) Ričardas Berankis / (Chinese Taipei) Lu Yen-hsun~~

The following pair received entry from the qualifying draw:

- (Italy) Alessandro Giannessi / (Spain) Carlos Taberner

The following pair received entry as lucky losers:

- (Philippines) Ruben Gonzales / (United States) Hunter Johnson

=== Withdrawals ===
Before the tournament

- (United Kingdom) Luke Bambridge / (United Kingdom) Dominic Inglot → replaced by (Philippines) Ruben Gonzales / (United States) Hunter Johnson
- (Italy) Simone Bolelli / (Argentina) Máximo González → replaced by (Croatia) Ivan Sabanov / (Croatia) Matej Sabanov
- (Belgium) Sander Gillé / (Belgium) Joran Vliegen → replaced by (Belgium) Sander Gillé / (India) Divij Sharan
- (Spain) Marcel Granollers / (Argentina) Horacio Zeballos → replaced by (United States) James Cerretani / (Mexico) Hans Hach Verdugo
- (Austria) Oliver Marach / (Austria) Philipp Oswald → replaced by (India) N.Sriram Balaji / (Switzerland) Luca Margaroli

During the tournament

- (Serbia) Filip Krajinović / (Serbia) Dušan Lajović

== WTA singles main draw entrants ==
=== Seeds ===
Country	Player	Rank^{1}	Seed
UKR	Dayana Yastremska	38	1
KAZ	Yulia Putintseva	43	2
SLO	Tamara Zidanšek	47	3
USA	Danielle Collins	48	4
FRA	Fiona Ferro	51	5
SUI	Jil Teichmann	55	6
USA	Bernarda Pera	74	7
FRA	Caroline Garcia	76	8

- ^{1} Rankings are as of 28 June 2021.

=== Other entrants ===
The following players received wildcards into the main draw:

- (Germany) Mona Barthel
- (Germany) Tamara Korpatsch
- (Germany) Jule Niemeier

The following players received entry from the qualifying draw:

- (Russia) Marina Melnikova
- (Luxembourg) Mandy Minella
- (Romania) Elena-Gabriela Ruse
- (Germany) Anna Zaja

The following player received entry as a lucky loser:

- (Slovakia) Kristína Kučová

=== Withdrawals ===
Before the tournament

- (Spain) Paula Badosa → replaced by (Czech Republic) Kristýna Plíšková
- (Romania) Sorana Cîrstea → replaced by (Romania) Irina Bara
- (France) Alizé Cornet → replaced by (Slovakia) Kristína Kučová
- (Russia) Varvara Gracheva → replaced by (Germany) Andrea Petkovic
- (Czech Republic) Tereza Martincová → replaced by (Croatia) Ana Konjuh
- (Germany) Laura Siegemund → replaced by (Belgium) Ysaline Bonaventure
- (Spain) Sara Sorribes Tormo → replaced by (Australia) Astra Sharma
- (Romania) Patricia Maria Țig → replaced by (Poland) Magdalena Fręch
- (China) Zhang Shuai → replaced by (Germany) Anna-Lena Friedsam

== WTA doubles main draw entrants ==
=== Seeds ===
Country	Player	Country	Player	Rank^{1}	Seed
BLR	Lidziya Marozava	CZE	Renata Voráčová	189	1
FRA	Elixane Lechemia	USA	Ingrid Neel	203	2
GER	Vivian Heisen	POL	Alicja Rosolska	207	3
JPN	Miyu Kato	POL	Katarzyna Piter	211	4

- ^{1} Rankings are as of 28 June 2021.

=== Other entrants ===
The following pair received a wildcard into the doubles main draw:

- (Germany) Eva Lys / (Germany) Noma Noha Akugue
