= Filip Krajinović =

Serbian tennis player

Filip Krajinović Филип Крајиновић
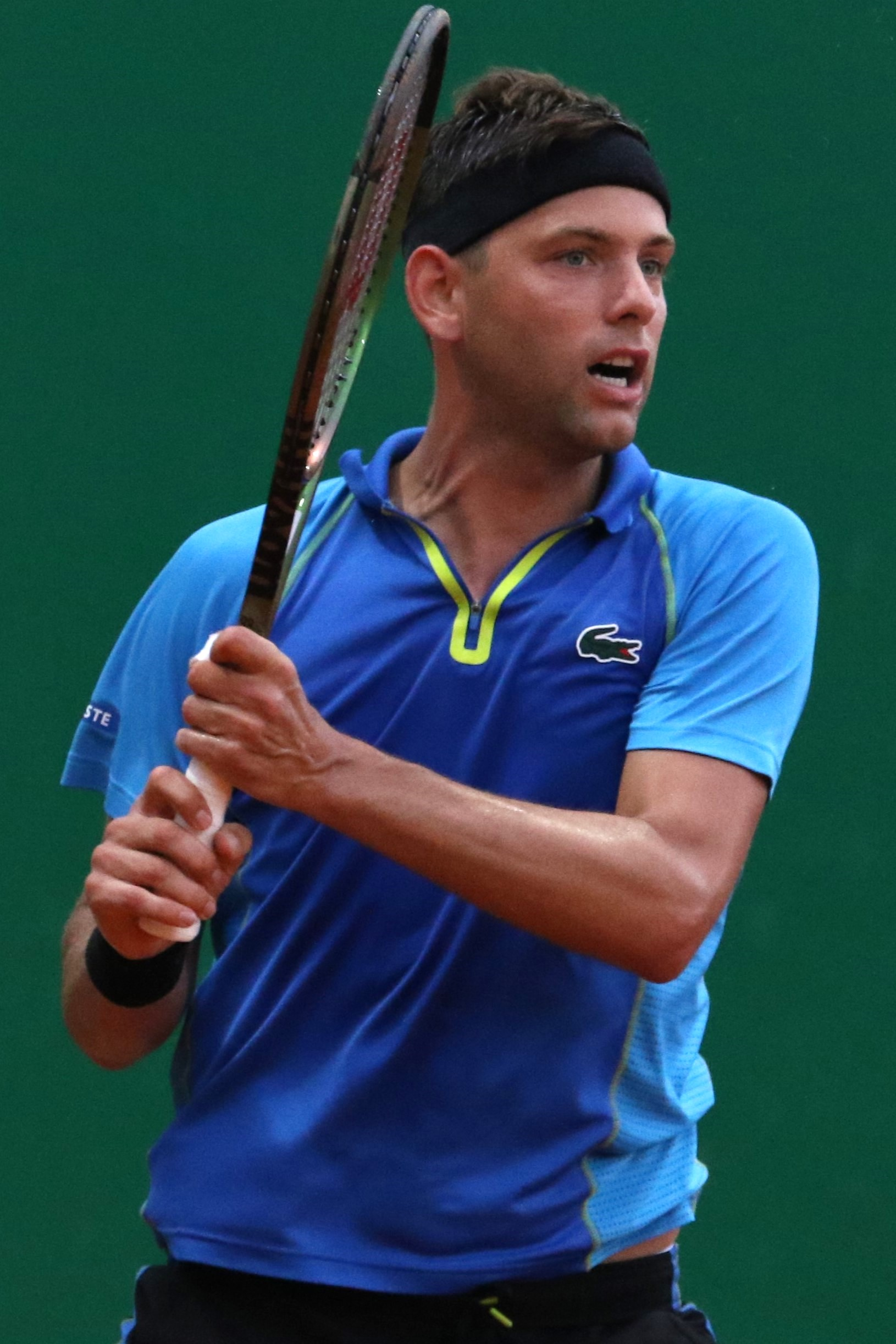
- Krajinović at the 2023 Monte-Carlo Masters
- Country (sports): Serbia
- Residence: Belgrade, Serbia
- Born: 27 February 1992 (age 34) Sombor, SR Serbia, SFR Yugoslavia
- Height: 1.85 m (6 ft 1 in)
- Turned pro: 2008
- Retired: 2024
- Plays: Right-handed (two-handed backhand)
- Coach: David "Red" Ayme & Chip Brooks (2007–2009); Ivica Ančić (2009–2011); Đorđe Najdanov (2012–2014); Diego Nargiso (2014–2015); Dušan Vemić (2015); Petar Popović (2017–2018); Thomas Johansson (2018–2019); Nemanja Kontić (2019); Janko Tipsarević (2019–2020); Frank Dancevic (2022)
- Prize money: US$6,181,367

Singles
- Career record: 123–131
- Career titles: 0
- Highest ranking: No. 26 (23 April 2018)

Grand Slam singles results
- Australian Open: 3R (2019, 2021)
- French Open: 3R (2019, 2022)
- Wimbledon: 2R (2022)
- US Open: 3R (2020)

Doubles
- Career record: 14–28
- Career titles: 0
- Highest ranking: No. 201 (16 April 2018)

Grand Slam doubles results
- Australian Open: 1R (2021, 2022)
- French Open: 1R (2015, 2019, 2021, 2022)
- Wimbledon: 1R (2019, 2021)
- US Open: 1R (2018, 2021)

Team competitions
- Davis Cup: SF (2017)
- Last updated on: 8 April 2024.

Filip Krajinović (Serbian Cyrillic: Филип Крајиновић, pronounced [fǐlip krajǐːnoʋitɕ]; born 27 February 1992) is a Serbian former professional tennis player. He achieved a career-high singles ranking of world No. 26 on 23 April 2018.

His best individual result has been a Masters 1000 final, at the 2017 Paris Masters. He played a Davis Cup semifinal with the Serbian national team. His ATP Tour debut came at the 2009 Serbia Open.

== Career ==
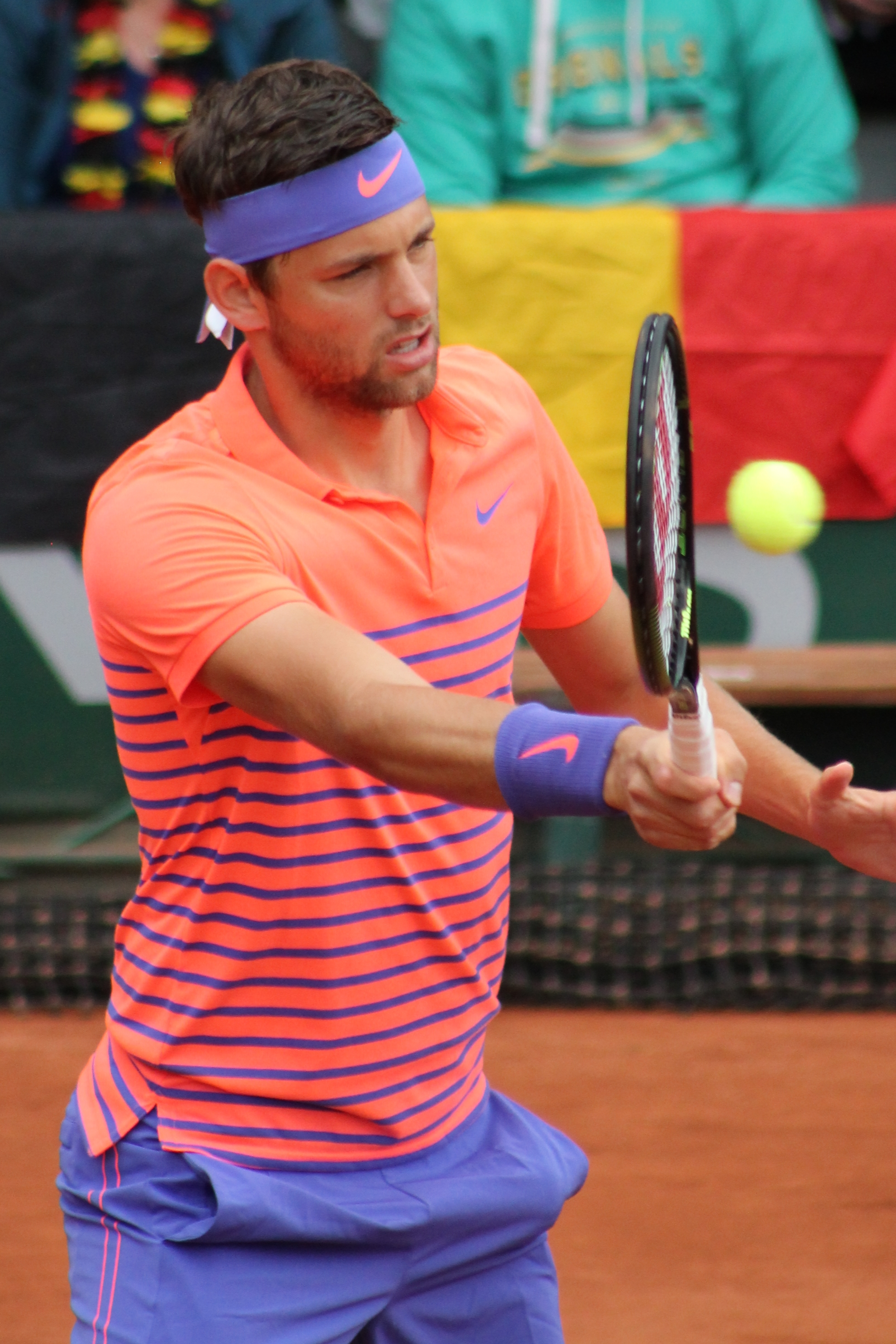
Krajinović at 2015 French Open

=== Junior career ===
Krajinović started playing tennis in local tennis clinic TK Žak. In 2006, he reached the fourth round of 2006 Orange Bowl, losing to Bernard Tomic. Soon after, in 2007, he signed a contract with prestigious Nick Bollettieri Tennis Academy in Bradenton, Florida. The same year, Krajinović won four junior singles titles – Pančevo, Atlanta, Texas, and Boca Raton.

In 2008, Krajinović won a junior title in Loverval. He reached the third round of 2008 French Open, losing to Evgeny Donskoy. At the 2008 Wimbledon Championships, he reached his first junior Grand Slam semifinal, losing to eventual champion Grigor Dimitrov in straight sets. Krajinović also lost to Devin Britton in the semifinals of 2008 US Open.

Throughout his junior career, Krajinović compiled a singles win–loss record of 54–9, reaching as high as No. 6 in the junior combined world rankings in February 2009.

=== 2008–09: ATP Tour debut ===
Krajinović made his professional debut at the Futures event in 2008 at Miami Beach, Florida, but lost in the first round. He played at several more Futures and Challengers, his best result being the semifinals in Knoxville, Tennessee, when he retired from his semifinals match against Bobby Reynolds due to a foot injury. In Knoxville, he had a large group of supporters, mostly Serbian students attending the University of Tennessee. In February 2009, Krajinović played qualifications for SAP Open, but lost to Somdev Devvarman in the first round. In March Krajinović was invited by Serbia Davis Cup team captain Bogdan Obradović to be with the team for their 2009 Davis Cup World Group first round tie against Spain, but didn't play in an official match. In April he reached the quarterfinals of 2009 U.S. Men's Clay Court Championships qualifications in Houston, Texas, losing in straight sets to Michael Russell. Krajinović made his ATP debut after receiving a wildcard into the Serbia Open main draw, losing to Marcel Granollers in three sets in the first round. In the summer, he reached the finals of three events – Futures in Chico, California and Rochester, New York, and a Challenger in San Sebastián.

=== 2010: Breaking the top 200 ===
In February 2010, he took part in Challenger tournament GEMAX Open in Belgrade, defeating Somdev Devvarman in the first round but losing to Alex Bogdanovic. Krajinović played the qualifications for the BNP Paribas Open. He defeated former French Open champion Gastón Gaudio in three sets in the first round, but then lost to Tim Smyczek in the second. During the tournament, Krajinović practiced along with world No. 1 player Roger Federer. Upon losing to Harel Levy in the second round of Challenger in Sunrise qualifying, he was awarded with a wild card for Sony Ericsson Open main draw, where he lost to former world No. 4 player James Blake in three sets in the first round. Krajinović then earned a wild card for 2010 Barcelona Open Banco Sabadell, where he lost to Juan Ignacio Chela in the first round. Receiving a wild card for 2010 Serbia Open, Krajinović collected his first ATP World Tour victory over Evgeny Donskoy. He then defeated Horacio Zeballos in the second round and won the first set against the first seed and world No. 2 Novak Djokovic in the quarterfinals when Djokovic retired. Krajinović lost to the third seed and eventual tournament winner Sam Querrey in the semifinals. He then joined Viktor Troicki and Nenad Zimonjić in the team of Serbia at the World Team Cup in Düsseldorf, Germany. Krajinović also made the second Challenger final of his career in Košice, Slovakia.

=== 2011: Injury ===
He missed first four months of 2011 due to a shoulder injury from previous year. He returned to tour for four tournaments during May and June; however, on 14 July, Krajinović took the option of having an operation to fix the persistent injury.

=== 2012: Return to Futures circuit, Grand Slam debut ===
Starting from scratch with a ranking of 1403, Krajinović returned to the ITF Futures circuit and to the ATP Challenger Tour. In May, he made his Roland Garros debut, defeating three opponents, all of whom were ranked several hundred places above him, in the qualifying round and returning to the top 500 in the process. In November, he began training at Piatti Tennis Team camp where he was coached by Riccardo Piatti and Ivan Ljubičić among others.

=== 2013: Continued rise ===
He was runner-up at four Futures tournaments and finished the year ranked 226.

=== 2014: Breaking the top 100 ===
Krajinović won his first professional title on 6 April 2014 at the ITF tournament in Harlingen (TX, USA, 15k). He followed that up with another Futures title and his first Challenger final, in which he lost to Nick Kyrgios. Later that year, he won two Challenger titles on Italian clay courts, qualified for the US Open main draw, and entered the top 100.

=== 2015–16: Davis Cup quarterfinals ===
Krajinović earned his first direct-entry into the main draw of a major at the 2015 Australian Open; his first win at a major came at the US Open to Alejandro González, before losing to David Ferrer in the second round. In both 2015 and 2016, Krajinović's efforts contributed to the Serbian team finishing two consecutive years in the Davis Cup quarterfinals. In 2016, he once again spent several months sidelined with injury, first in May and June, then ending his season in early September; as a result, he dropped out of the top 200.

=== 2017: Masters final and Davis Cup semifinal ===
In 2017, he won five Challenger Tour titles, all on clay: the Neckar Cup, Marburg Open, Thindown Challenger Biella, BFD Energy Challenger in Rome, and the Almaty Challenger. Krajinović broke into the top 75, after reaching the second round of Moscow as a qualifier. He made an unexpected late-season run at the Paris Masters, qualifying for only his second ATP main draw of the year. After defeating Yūichi Sugita, Sam Querrey and Nicolas Mahut, his quarterfinal opponent, world No. 1 Rafael Nadal, withdrew from their match due to injury. He then beat John Isner to reach the final, becoming the first qualifier to reach the final at Masters level since Jerzy Janowicz in 2012 and the lowest ranked player to compete in a Masters 1000 final since world No. 98 Mardy Fish in Indian Wells in 2008. He lost to Jack Sock, but as the runner-up reached a then career-high ranking of world No. 33.

=== 2018: Top 30 and injuries ===
After an early exit in Qatar and missing the Australian Open due to injury, he found solid form making the final 16 in Rotterdam, losing a tight match to world No. 5 Grigor Dimitrov and a quarterfinal appearance at the Open 13. At the Dubai Tennis Championships, he made his first ATP 500 semifinal allowing him to reach the top 30. In Indian Wells, he ran into world No. 1 Roger Federer in the third round, losing in straight sets. He achieved a career-high No. 26 in ATP rankings on 23 April. He did not compete at the French Open and his season was shortened to seven tournaments in the opening seven months of season due to left foot, left ankle and hand injuries. In August, he retired in US Open first round due to cramps while trailing Matthew Ebden in the fifth set.

=== 2019: Two finals and return to top 40 ===
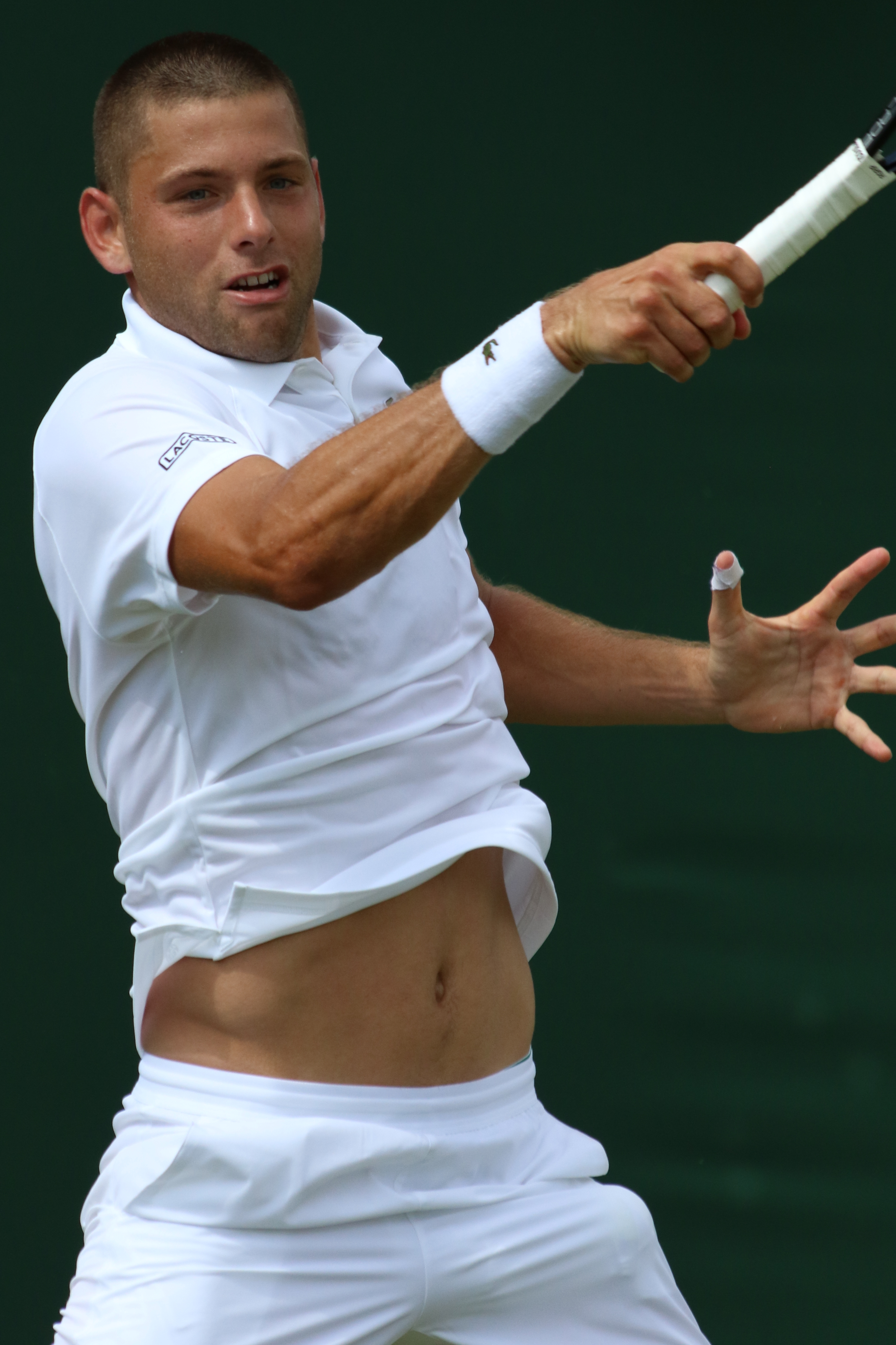
Krajinovic at the 2019 Wimbledon Championships

At the Australian Open, he defeated world No. 18 and French Open semifinalist Marco Cecchinato in five sets to earn his first Grand Slam match victory since 2015. He assisted Serbia to qualify for the Davis Cup Finals in November. In Indian Wells, he defeated David Goffin and Daniil Medvedev before losing to Rafael Nadal in the fourth round. In Miami he defeated three-time Grand Slam champion Stan Wawrinka before losing to Roger Federer in the third round.

=== 2020: Masters quarterfinal and return to top 30 ===
In February Krajinović reached the semifinals of the Rotterdam Open after besting the tournament's 7th seed Russia's Andrey Rublev in straight sets in the quarterfinals. He then lost in straight sets to the tournament's eventual champion, Gaël Monfils of France, in the semis. At the 2020 Western & Southern Open he defeated world no.3 Dominic Thiem in the 2nd round for his first top 10 victory in 10 years. However, he lost to Milos Raonic in the quarterfinals in 3 sets, despite serving for the match and holding a match point in the 3rd set.

=== 2021: ATP 500 final ===
Krajinović started his 2021 season by representing Serbia at the ATP Cup. He only played in the match against Canada. Partnering with Novak Djokovic in doubles, they beat Milos Raonic/Denis Shapovalov to win the tie over Canada. Despite winning last year, Serbia failed to defend their title and ended second in Group A. Seeded 28th at the Australian Open, he reached the third round where he lost to fourth seed and eventual finalist, Daniil Medvedev, in five sets.

In March, Krajinović competed at the Qatar ExxonMobil Open. He was defeated in the first round by sixth seed and world No. 14, David Goffin. Seeded 14th at the Dubai Championships, he made it to the third round where he lost to qualifier and eventual finalist, Lloyd Harris.

Krajinović started his clay-court season in April at the Monte-Carlo Masters. He reached the third round where he was defeated by 15th seed, world No. 18, and defending champion, Fabio Fognini. Seeded fifth at the Serbia Open, he reached the quarterfinals where he lost to second seed, world No. 10, and eventual champion, Matteo Berrettini. Seeded fourth at the BMW Open in Munich, he fell in the quarterfinals to seventh seed and eventual finalist, Jan-Lennard Struff in three sets. In Madrid, he lost in the first round to lucky loser Yoshihito Nishioka. At the Italian Open, he was eliminated in the first round by Félix Auger-Aliassime. Ranked 41 at the French Open, he lost in the second round to 31st seed and world No. 34, John Isner.

Ranked 44 at Wimbledon, Krajinović lost in the first round to Alex Bolt.

After Wimbledon, Krajinović played at the Hamburg Open. Seeded sixth, he upset top seed and world No. 4, Stefanos Tsitsipas, in the quarterfinals. He then beat compatriot, Laslo Djere, in the semifinals to reach the fourth ATP singles final of his career. He lost in the final to second seed and world No. 13, Pablo Carreño Busta. Seeded third at the Croatia Open Umag, he reached the quarterfinals where he lost to seventh seed, rising star, and eventual champion, Carlos Alcaraz, in three sets. Seeded third at the Generali Open Kitzbühel, he made it to the quarterfinals where he was beaten by Arthur Rinderknech.

In August, Krajinović competed at the Western & Southern Open in Cincinnati. He lost in the first round to 14th seed and world No. 18, Alex de Minaur, in three sets, despite winning the first set 6–0. Seeded 32nd at the US Open, he was ousted from the tournament in the first round by Guido Pella in four sets.

=== 2022: First grass court final ===
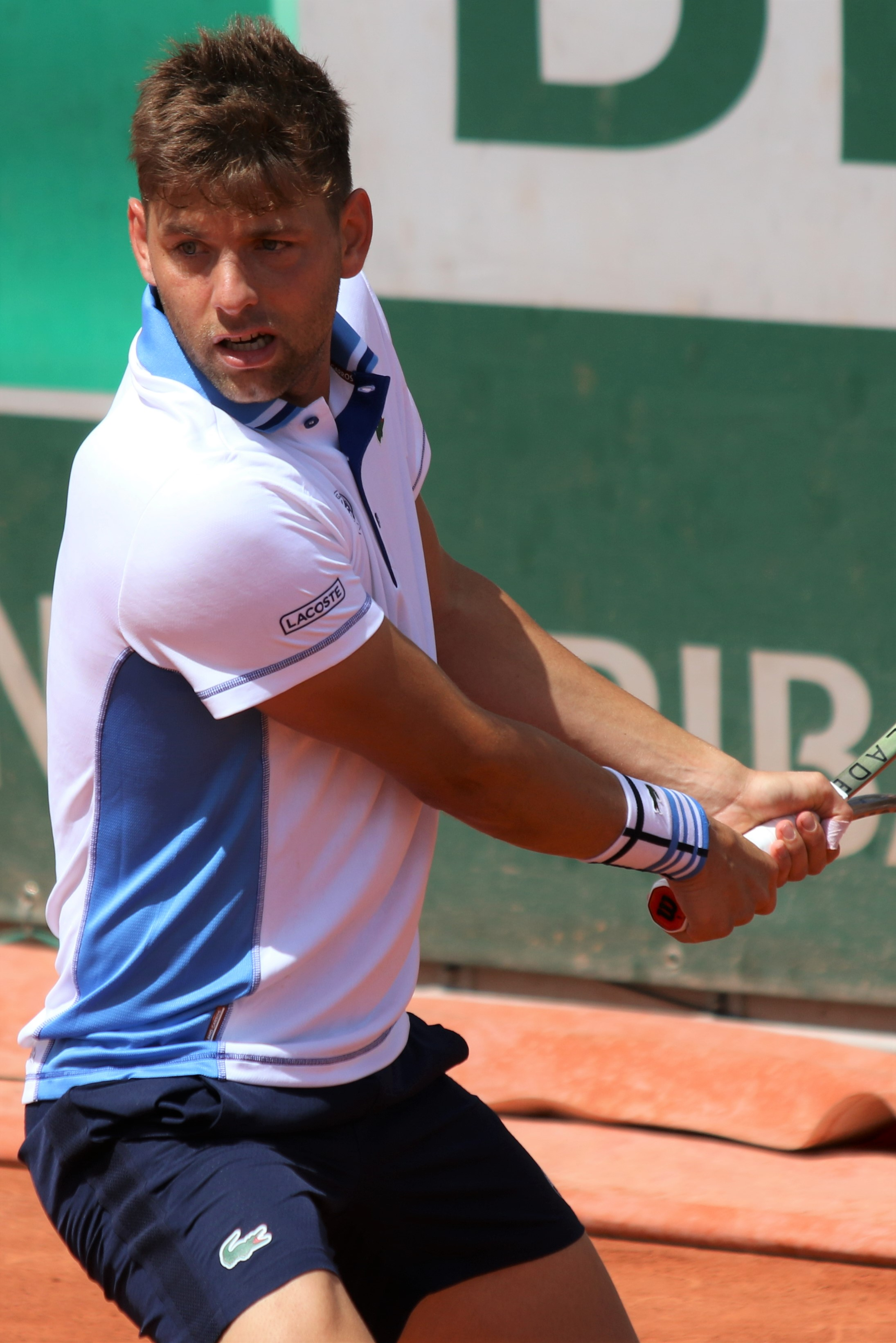
Krajinović at the 2022 French Open

Krajinović started his 2022 season by representing Serbia at the ATP Cup. Serbia was in Group A alongside Norway, Chile, and Spain. He won his first singles match by beating Viktor Durasovic of Norway. He won his second singles match by defeating Alejandro Tabilo of Chile. He then lost his third singles match to Pablo Carreño Busta of Spain. In the end, Serbia ended third in Group A. Ranked 36 at the Australian Open, he lost in the first round to 13th seed Diego Schwartzman.

Seeded fifth at the Open Sud de France, Krajinović reached the semifinals where he was defeated by sixth seed and world No. 35, Alexander Bublik. At the Rotterdam Open, he lost in the first round to last year finalist Márton Fucsovics. Krajinović was expected to make his fourth main draw appearance at the Qatar ExxonMobil Open this year; however, he withdrew late. In Dubai, he was eliminated in the second round by Mackenzie McDonald. At the Indian Wells Masters, he was ousted from the tournament in the second round by 26th seed and world No. 28, Gaël Monfils.

Starting his clay-court season at the Monte-Carlo Masters, Krajinović lost in the first round to 2019 finalist and compatriot, Dušan Lajović. Seeded eighth at the Serbia Open, he was defeated in the second round by qualifier Thiago Monteiro. In Madrid, he lost in the first round to John Isner. At the Italian Open, he upset sixth seed and world No. 7, Andrey Rublev, in the second round. He was defeated in the third round by 10th seed and world No. 13, Jannik Sinner. Ranked 55 at the French Open, he beat 17th seed, Reilly Opelka, in the first round. He lost in the third round to ninth seed Félix Auger-Aliassime.

Krajinović made his first grass court final at the Queen's Club Championships by beating Jenson Brooksby, Sam Querrey, Ryan Peniston, and 7th seed Marin Čilić despite having no grass court wins prior to the event. He lost in the final to second seed, world No. 10, and defending champion, Matteo Berrettini. Despite losing in the final, his ranking improved from 48 to 31. Seeded 26th at Wimbledon, he was eliminated in the second round by eventual finalist Nick Kyrgios.

Last year finalist at the Hamburg Open, Krajinović was beaten in the second round by top seed, world No. 6, and eventual finalist, Carlos Alcaraz.

In August, Krajinović competed at the National Bank Open in Montreal. He lost in the first round to Dan Evans. At the Western & Southern Open in Cincinnati, he was defeated in the second round by fourth seed, world No. 7, and eventual finalist, Stefanos Tsitsipas. Ranked 44 at the US Open, he lost in the first round to 18th seed and world No. 20, Alex de Minaur.

=== 2023–2024: Pune quarterfinalist, loss of form, retirement ===
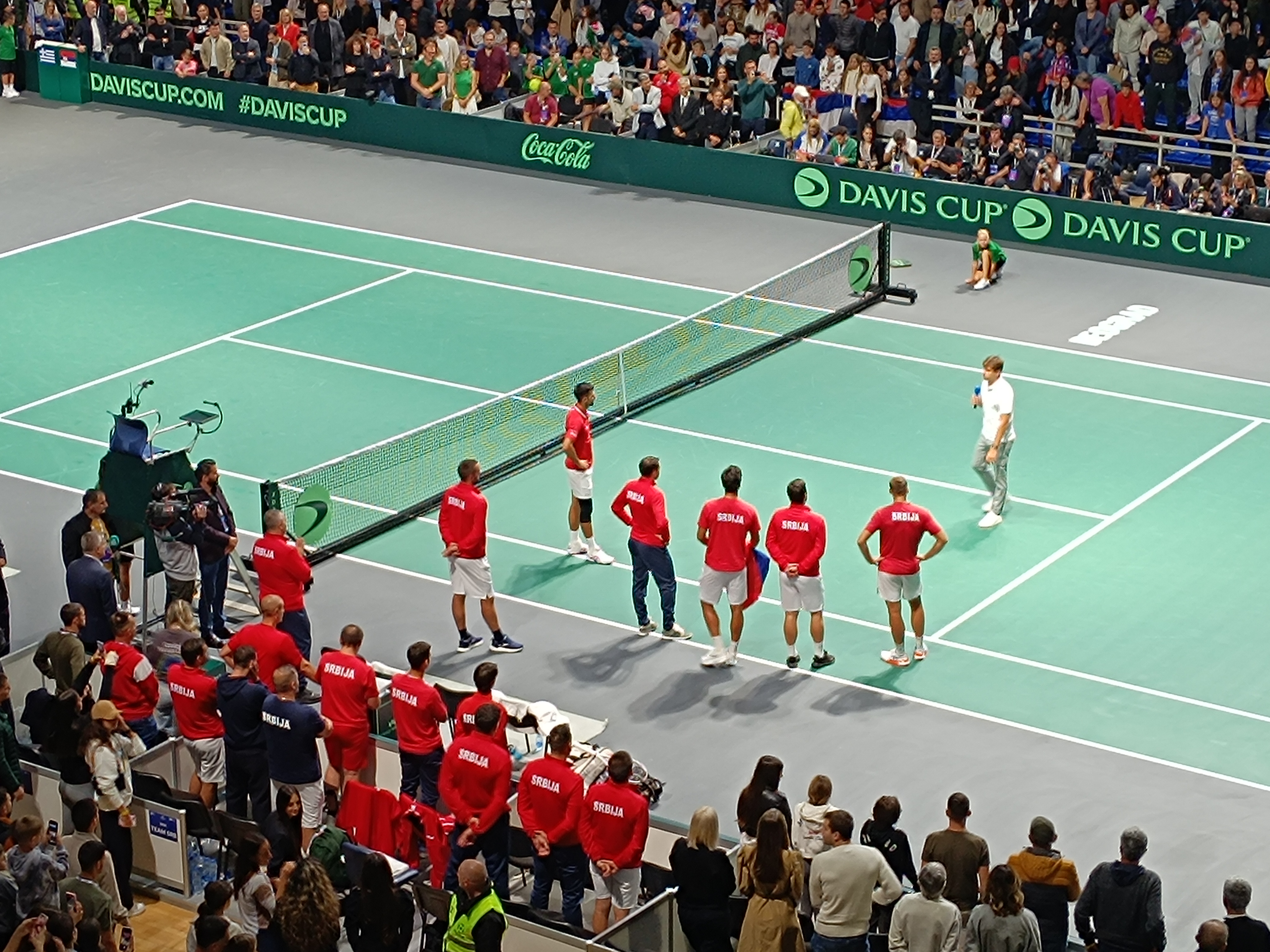
Krajinović during his retirement speech from Serbia Davis Cup team after the match between Serbia and Greece, September 2024

Krajinović started his 2023 season at the Maharashtra Open in Pune, India. Seeded sixth, he reached the quarterfinals where he lost to eventual finalist Benjamin Bonzi. At the Australian Open, he was defeated in the first round by ninth seed and world No. 10, Holger Rune.

In February, Krajinović competed at the Open Sud de France. He lost in the second round to Lorenzo Sonego. At the Open 13 Provence in Marseille, France, he was eliminated in the first round by Alexander Bublik. In Dubai, he lost in the first round to second seed, world No. 6, defending champion, and eventual finalist, Andrey Rublev. In March, he competed at the BNP Paribas Open. Here, he was defeated in the first round by Mackenzie McDonald.

Krajinović announced that his final appearance will be at the 2024 US Open, where he lost to Jurij Rodionov in the first round of the qualifying draw.

In September 2024, Filip Krajinovic officially retired from professional tennis in front of his home crowd, in Belgrade, during Davis Cup tie between Serbia and Greece, which Serbia won 3:1.

== Playing style and endorsements ==
With hard court as his favourite and double-handed backhand as a favourite shot, Krajinović is often compared to Andre Agassi, for which was named Agassi of Sombor. In a 2008 article published by The Independent, Nick Bollettieri himself compared him to younger Agassi.

After signing a contract with prestigious Bollettieri Tennis Academy, Krajinović also signed a sponsorship deal with Nike. In 2009, he signed with Wilson Sporting Goods. He is currently managed by Olivier van Lindonk of IMG and coached by Petar Popović.

== Personal life ==
Krajinović was born on 27 February 1992 to Vera and Stjepan Krajinović in Sombor, Serbia, SFR Yugoslavia. He has a brother Damir and sister Katarina, and started playing tennis at age five. Through his distant ancestors, he is of partial Croatian descent and he holds the Croatian passport. Filip is passionate fan of Crvena Zvezda.

== Performance timelines ==
Key
W	F	SF	QF	#R	RR	Q#	DNQ	A	NH

(W) winner; (F) finalist; (SF) semifinalist; (QF) quarterfinalist; (#R) rounds 4, 3, 2, 1; (RR) round-robin stage; (Q#) qualification round; (DNQ) did not qualify; (A) absent; (NH) not held; (SR) strike rate (events won / competed); (W–L) win–loss record.
To avoid confusion and double counting, these charts are updated at the conclusion of a tournament or when the player's participation has ended.

=== Singles ===
Current through the 2024 US Open.

Tournament	2009	2010	2011	2012	2013	2014	2015	2016	2017	2018	2019	2020	2021	2022	2023	2024	SR	W–L	Win%
Grand Slam tournaments
Australian Open	A	A	A	A	A	Q1	1R	1R	A	A	3R	2R	3R	1R	1R	A	0 / 7	5–7	42%
French Open	A	A	A	1R	A	Q3	1R	A	Q2	A	3R	1R	2R	3R	1R	Q2	0 / 7	5–7	42%
Wimbledon	A	Q1	A	Q1	A	Q2	1R	A	Q1	1R	1R	NH	1R	2R	A	A	0 / 5	1–5	17%
US Open	A	Q2	A	A	A	1R	2R	A	Q2	1R	1R	3R	1R	1R	A	Q1	0 / 7	3–7	30%
Win–loss	0–0	0–0	0–0	0–1	0–0	0–1	1–4	0–1	0–0	0–2	4–4	3–3	3–4	3–4	0–2	0–0	0 / 26	14–26	35%
National representation
Davis Cup	Alt	A	A	A	Alt	1R	QF	QF	SF	A	QF	SF		GS	SF	A	0 / 8	8–4	67%
World Team Cup	A	RR	A	A	Not Held												0 / 1	0–2	0%
Summer Olympic Games	Not Held			A	Not Held			A	Not Held				A	Not Held		A	0 / 0	0–0	–
Win–loss	0–0	0–2	0–0	0–0	0–0	3–0	1–2	0–0	0–0	0–0	2–0	0–0	0–1	0–0	0–0	0–0	0 / 7	8–6	57%
ATP Tour Masters 1000
Indian Wells Masters	A	Q2	A	A	A	A	1R	A	A	3R	4R	NH	3R	2R	1R	A	0 / 6	6–6	50%
Miami Open	A	1R	A	A	A	Q2	2R	A	A	4R	3R	NH	A	A	A	A	0 / 4	5–4	56%
Monte-Carlo Masters	A	A	A	A	A	A	A	1R	A	A	A	NH	3R	1R	1R	A	0 / 4	2–4	33%
Madrid Open	A	A	A	A	A	A	A	A	A	A	A	NH	1R	1R	1R	A	0 / 3	0–3	0%
Italian Open	A	A	A	A	A	A	A	A	A	A	A	3R	1R	3R	1R	A	0 / 4	4–4	50%
Canadian Open	A	A	A	A	A	A	A	A	A	1R	A	NH	A	1R	A	A	0 / 2	0–2	0%
Cincinnati Masters	A	A	A	A	A	A	A	A	A	1R	A	QF	1R	2R	A	A	0 / 4	4–4	50%
Shanghai Masters	A	A	A	A	A	Q2	A	A	A	1R	1R	Not Held			A	A	0 / 2	0–2	0%
Paris Masters	A	A	A	A	A	A	A	A	F	1R	A	1R	1R	A	A	A	0 / 4	4–4	50%
Win–loss	0–0	0–1	0–0	0–0	0–0	0–0	1–2	0–1	4–1	3–6	5–3	5–3	3–6	4–6	0–4	0–0	0 / 33	25–33	43%
Career statistics
	2009	2010	2011	2012	2013	2014	2015	2016	2017	2018	2019	2020	2021	2022	2023	2024	SR	W–L	Win%
Tournaments	1	3	0	2	1	4	11	5	2	17	17	12	22	16	12	0	Career total: 125		
Titles	0	0	0	0	0	0	0	0	0	0	0	0	0	0	0	0	Career total: 0		
Finals	0	0	0	0	0	0	0	0	1	0	2	0	1	1	0	0	Career total: 5		
Overall win–loss	0–1	3–5	0–0	1–2	0–1	7–4	4–13	1–4	5–2	14–17	31–18	16–12	21–24	19–17	3–12	0–0	0 / 125	123–131	48%
Year-end ranking^{1}	356	213	1404	416	226	101	101	237	34	95	40	31	42	54	311		$6,138,952		

^{1} 2008: ATP ranking–901, tournaments–0, win/loss 0–0.

=== Doubles ===
Tournament	2014	2015	2016	2017	2018	2019	2020	2021	2022	2023	2024	SR	W–L	Win%
Grand Slam tournaments
Australian Open	A	A	A	A	A	A	A	1R	1R	A	A	0 / 2	0–2	0%
French Open	A	1R	A	A	A	1R	A	1R	1R	A		0 / 4	0–4	0%
Wimbledon	A	A	A	A	A	1R	NH	1R	A	A		0 / 2	0–2	0%
US Open	A	A	A	A	1R	A	A	1R	A	A		0 / 2	0–2	0%
Win–loss	0–0	0–1	0–0	0–0	0–1	0–2	0–0	0–4	0–2	0–0	0–0	0 / 10	0–10	0%
ATP World Tour Masters 1000
Indian Wells Masters	1R	A	A	A	1R	A	NH	1R	A	A		0 / 3	0–3	0%
Miami Open	A	A	A	A	1R	A	NH	A	A	A		0 / 1	0–1	0%
Cincinnati Masters	A	A	A	A	A	A	A	2R	A	A		0 / 1	1–1	50%
Shanghai Masters	A	A	A	A	A	2R	Not Held			A		0 / 1	1–1	50%
Paris Masters	A	A	A	A	A	A	A	2R	A	A		0 / 1	1–1	50%
Win–loss	0–1	0–0	0–0	0–0	0–2	1–1	0–0	2–3	0–0	0–0	0–0	0 / 7	3–7	30%
National representation
Davis Cup	1R	QF	QF	SF	A	QF	SF		GS	SF		0 / 8	3–5	38%
World Team Cup	Not Held											0 / 1	1–0	100%
Win–loss	0–1	0–0	0–1	0–1	0–0	0–0	0–0	1–1	1–1	1–0	0–0	0 / 9	4–5	44%
Career statistics
Tournaments	2	2	0	1	6	4	0	8	2	0	0	Career total: 25		
Overall win–loss	0–2	2–2	0–1	0–2	2–6	1–4	0–0	5–8	2–3	1–0	0–0	0 / 25	14–28	33%
Year-end ranking^{1}	1453	310	N/A	782	223	451	500	297	825	–				

^{1}2010: ATP ranking: 743, Tournaments: 0, Win–loss: 1–0.
2013: ATP ranking: 1266, Tournaments: 0, Win–loss: 0–0.

== Significant finals ==
=== ATP Masters 1000 finals ===
==== Singles: 1 (1 runner-up) ====
Result	Year	Tournament	Surface	Opponent	Score
Loss	2017	Paris Masters	Hard (i)	(United States) Jack Sock	7–5, 4–6, 1–6

== ATP career finals ==
=== Singles: 5 (5 runner-ups) ===
Legend Grand Slam tournaments (0–0) ATP World Tour Finals (0–0) ATP World Tour Masters 1000 (0–1) ATP World Tour 500 Series (0–2) ATP World Tour 250 Series (0–2)	Finals by surface Hard (0–2) Clay (0–2) Grass (0–1)	Finals by conditions Outdoors (0–3) Indoors (0–2)

Result	W–L	Date	Tournament	Tier	Surface	Opponent	Score
Loss	0–1	Nov 2017	Paris Masters, France	Masters 1000	Hard (i)	(United States) Jack Sock	7–5, 4–6, 1–6
Loss	0–2	Apr 2019	Hungarian Open Budapest, Hungary	250 Series	Clay	(Italy) Matteo Berrettini	6–4, 3–6, 1–6
Loss	0–3	Oct 2019	Stockholm Open, Sweden	250 Series	Hard (i)	(Canada) Denis Shapovalov	4–6, 4–6
Loss	0–4	Jul 2021	Hamburg European Open, Germany	500 Series	Clay	(Spain) Pablo Carreño Busta	2–6, 4–6
Loss	0–5	Jun 2022	Queen's Club Championships, United Kingdom	500 Series	Grass	(Italy) Matteo Berrettini	5–7, 4–6

== ATP Challenger and Futures finals ==
=== Singles: 25 (12 titles, 13 runner–ups) ===
Legend ATP Challenger Tour (10–7) ITF Futures Tour (2–6)	Finals by surface Hard (2–1) Clay (10–12)

Result	W–L	Date	Tournament	Tier	Surface	Opponent	Score
Loss	0–1	Jun 2009	USA F14, Chico	Futures	Hard	(United States) Ryan Harrison	3–6, 4–6
Loss	0–2	Jul 2009	USA F15, Rochester	Futures	Clay	(Greece) Vasilis Mazarakis	2–6, 0–6
Loss	0–3	Aug 2009	San Sebastián, Spain	Challenger	Clay	(Netherlands) Thiemo de Bakker	2–6, 3–6
Loss	0–4	Jun 2010	Košice, Slovakia	Challenger	Clay	(Spain) Rubén Ramírez Hidalgo	3–6, 2–6
Loss	0–5	Aug 2013	Poland F5, Bytom	Futures	Clay	(Slovenia) Blaž Rola	w/o
Loss	0–6	Sep 2013	Morocco F4, Agadir	Futures	Clay	(Morocco) Lamine Ouahab	1–6, 6–7^{(2–7)}
Loss	0–7	Oct 2013	Morocco F5, Taroudant	Futures	Clay	(Morocco) Lamine Ouahab	7–6^{(7–5)}, 4–6, 1–6
Loss	0–8	Oct 2013	Hungary F2, Budapest	Futures	Clay	(Poland) Piotr Gadomski	4–6, 7–6^{(7–4)}, 3–6
Win	1–8	Apr 2014	USA F10, Harlingen	Futures	Hard	(United Kingdom) Daniel Smethurst	6–2, 6–4
Win	2–8	Apr 2014	USA F11, Little Rock	Futures	Hard	(United Kingdom) Daniel Smethurst	6–1, 7–6^{(7–1)}
Loss	2–9	Apr 2014	Sarasota, United States	Challenger	Clay	(Australia) Nick Kyrgios	6–7^{(8–10)}, 4–6
Win	3–9	Jun 2014	Vicenza, Italy	Challenger	Clay	(Slovakia) Norbert Gombos	6–4, 6–4
Win	4–9	Aug 2014	Cortina, Italy	Challenger	Clay	(Italy) Federico Gaio	2–6, 7–6^{(7–5)}, 7–5
Win	5–9	Jul 2015	Braunschweig, Germany	Challenger	Clay	(France) Paul-Henri Mathieu	6–2, 6–4
Win	6–9	Aug 2015	Cordenons, Italy	Challenger	Clay	(Romania) Adrian Ungur	5–7, 6–4, 4–1 ret.
Loss	6–10	Oct 2015	Rome, Italy	Challenger	Clay	(Argentina) Federico Delbonis	6–1, 3–6, 4–6
Loss	6–11	May 2016	Rome, Italy	Challenger	Clay	(United Kingdom) Kyle Edmund	6–7^{(2–7)}, 0–6
Loss	6–12	Aug 2016	Manerbio, Italy	Challenger	Clay	(Argentina) Leonardo Mayer	6–7^{(3–7)}, 5–7
Win	7–12	May 2017	Heilbronn, Germany	Challenger	Clay	(Slovakia) Norbert Gombos	6–3, 6–2
Win	8–12	Jul 2017	Marburg, Germany	Challenger	Clay	(Germany) Cedrik-Marcel Stebe	6–2, 6–3
Win	9–12	Aug 2017	Biella, Italy	Challenger	Clay	(Italy) Salvatore Caruso	6–3, 6–2
Win	10–12	Oct 2017	Rome, Italy	Challenger	Clay	(Spain) Daniel Gimeno Traver	6–4, 6–3
Win	11–12	Oct 2017	Almaty, Kazakhstan	Challenger	Clay	(Serbia) Laslo Djere	6–0, 6–3
Loss	11–13	Apr 2019	Sophia Antipolis, France	Challenger	Clay	(Germany) Dustin Brown	3–6, 5–7
Win	12–13	May 2019	Heilbronn, Germany	Challenger	Clay	(Belgium) Arthur de Greef	6–3, 6–1

=== Doubles: 1 (1 title) ===
Legend ATP Challenger Tour (1–0) ITF Futures Tour (0–0)	Finals by surface Hard (0–0) Clay (1–0)

Result	W–L	Date	Tournament	Tier	Surface	Partner	Opponents	Score
Win	1–0	Apr 2015	Napoli, Italy	Challenger	Clay	(Serbia) Ilija Bozoljac	(Georgia (country)) Nikoloz Basilashvili (Belarus) Aliaksandr Bury	6–1, 6–2

== Record against other players ==
=== Record against top 10 players ===
Including ATP World Tour main draw, Grand Slam, Davis Cup, and Laver Cup only. Active players in bold.

Player	Record	Win %	Hard	Clay	Grass
Number 1 ranked players
(Serbia) **Novak Djokovic**	1–2	33%	0–1	1–1	0–0
(Russia) **Daniil Medvedev**	1–2	33%	1–2	0–0	0–0
(Spain) **Rafael Nadal**	0–1	0%	0–1	0–0	0–0
(Spain) **Carlos Alcaraz**	0–2	0%	0–0	0–2	0–0
(Switzerland) Roger Federer	0–4	0%	0–4	0–0	0–0
Number 2 ranked players
(Norway) **Casper Ruud**	1–0	100%	1–0	0–0	0–0
(Germany) **Alexander Zverev**	0–2	0%	0–1	0–1	0–0
Number 3 ranked players
(Croatia) **Marin Čilić**	1–0	100%	0–0	0–0	1–0
(Austria) **Dominic Thiem**	1–0	100%	1–0	0–0	0–0
(Switzerland) **Stan Wawrinka**	1–0	100%	1–0	0–0	0–0
(Greece) **Stefanos Tsitsipas**	1–3	25%	0–2	1–1	0–0
(Canada) **Milos Raonic**	0–1	0%	0–1	0–0	0–0
(Argentina) **Juan Martín del Potro**	0–2	0%	0–2	0–0	0–0
(Spain) David Ferrer	0–2	0%	0–1	0–1	0–0
(Bulgaria) **Grigor Dimitrov**	0–4	0%	0–3	0–1	0–0
Number 4 ranked players
(Czech Republic) Tomáš Berdych	1–1	50%	1–1	0–0	0–0
(Italy) **Jannik Sinner**	1–2	33%	1–1	0–1	0–0
(United States) James Blake	0–1	0%	0–1	0–0	0–0
Number 5 ranked players
(France) Jo-Wilfried Tsonga	2–0	100%	2–0	0–0	0–0
(United States) **Taylor Fritz**	1–0	100%	1–0	0–0	0–0
(Russia) **Andrey Rublev**	3–3	50%	2–3	1–0	0–0
(Spain) Tommy Robredo	0–1	0%	0–1	0–0	0–0
(Denmark) **Holger Rune**	0–1	0%	0–1	0–0	0–0
Number 6 ranked players
(France) Gilles Simon	1–1	50%	1–1	0–0	0–0
(Canada) **Félix Auger-Aliassime**	2–3	40%	1–1	1–2	0–0
(Italy) **Matteo Berrettini**	0–3	0%	0–0	0–2	0–1
(France) **Gaël Monfils**	0–4	0%	0–4	0–0	0–0
Number 7 ranked players
(Belgium) **David Goffin**	3–3	50%	2–1	1–2	0–0
(Spain) **Fernando Verdasco**	1–1	50%	1–1	0–0	0–0
Number 8 ranked players
(Cyprus) Marcos Baghdatis	1–0	100%	1–0	0–0	0–0
(United States) **John Isner**	1–2	33%	1–0	0–2	0–0
(United States) **Jack Sock**	0–1	0%	0–1	0–0	0–0
(Argentina) **Diego Schwartzman**	0–1	0%	0–1	0–0	0–0
(Russia) **Karen Khachanov**	0–2	0%	0–2	0–0	0–0
Number 9 ranked players
(Italy) **Fabio Fognini**	2–1	67%	1–0	1–1	0–0
(Poland) **Hubert Hurkacz**	0–1	0%	0–1	0–0	0–0
(Spain) **Roberto Bautista Agut**	0–2	0%	0–1	0–1	0–0
Number 10 ranked players
(United States) **Frances Tiafoe**	2–2	50%	0–1	2–1	0–0
(Spain) **Pablo Carreño Busta**	1–2	33%	1–1	0–1	0–0
(Canada) **Denis Shapovalov**	0–1	0%	0–1	0–0	0–0
(Australia) **Alex de Minaur**	0–2	0%	0–2	0–0	0–0
(France) **Lucas Pouille**	0–3	0%	0–3	0–0	0–0
**Total**	**28–68**	**29%**	**20–47** **(30%)**	**8–20** **(29%)**	**0–1** **(0%)**

Statistics correct as of 8 January 2024.

=== Top 10 wins ===
Krajinovic has a 4–29 record against players who were, at the time the match was played, ranked in the top 10.

Season	2010	...	2020	2021	2022	2023	Total
Wins	1		1	1	1	0	**4**

#	Player	Rank	Event	Surface	Rd	Score	FKR
**2010**
1.	(Serbia) Novak Djokovic	2	Serbia Open, Serbia	Clay	QF	6–4, ret.	319
**2020**
2.	(Austria) Dominic Thiem	3	Cincinnati Masters, United States	Hard	2R	6–2, 6–1	32
**2021**
3.	(Greece) Stefanos Tsitsipas	4	Hamburg European Open, Germany	Clay	QF	3–6, 6–1, 6–3	44
**2022**
4.	(Russia) Andrey Rublev	7	Italian Open, Italy	Clay	2R	6–2, 6–4	54

* Statistics correct as of 17 January 2023.

== Notable exhibitions ==
=== Singles ===
Result	Date	Tournament	Surface	Opponent	Score
Win	Jan 2021	A Day at The Drive, Adelaide, Australia	Hard	(Italy) Jannik Sinner	6–3
