= 2002 Betty Barclay Cup =

- Date: 30 April – 5 May
- Edition: 18th
- Category: Tier II
- Draw: 28S / 16D
- Prize money: $585,000
- Surface: Clay / outdoor
- Location: Hamburg, Germany
- Venue: Am Rothenbaum

Champions

Singles
- (Belgium) Kim Clijsters

Doubles
- (Switzerland) Martina Hingis / (Austria) Barbara Schett
- WTA Hamburg

The 2002 Betty Barclay Cup was a women's tennis tournament played on outdoor clay courts at Am Rothenbaum in Hamburg, Germany and was part of Tier II of the 2002 WTA Tour. It was the 18th and last edition of the tournament and was held from 30 April until 5 May 2002. Second-seeded Kim Clijsters won the singles title and earned $93,000 first-prize money.

== Finals ==
=== Singles ===
(Belgium) Kim Clijsters defeated (United States) Venus Williams 1–6, 6–3, 6–4

- It was Clijsters' 1st title of the year and the 7th of her career.

=== Doubles ===
(Switzerland) Martina Hingis / (Austria) Barbara Schett defeated (Slovakia) Daniela Hantuchová / (Spain) Arantxa Sánchez Vicario 6–1, 6–1
