= BFD Energy Challenger =

ATP Challenger Tour
- Event name: BFD Energy Challenger
- Location: Rome, Italy
- Venue: Due Ponti Sporting Club
- Category: ATP Challenger Tour
- Surface: Clay
- Draw: 32S/32Q/16D
- Prize money: €42,500 + H
- Website: bfdchallengertrophy.com

The BFD Energy Challenger is a professional tennis tournament played on clay courts. It is currently part of the Association of Tennis Professionals (ATP) Challenger Tour. It is held annually in Rome, Italy since 2015.

== Past finals ==
=== Singles ===
| Year | Champion | Runner-up | Score |
|---|---|---|---|
| 2017 | (Serbia) Filip Krajinović | (Spain) Daniel Gimeno Traver | 6–4, 6–3 |
| 2016 | (Czech Republic) Jan Šátral | (Netherlands) Robin Haase | 6–3, 6–2 |
| 2015 | (Argentina) Federico Delbonis | (Serbia) Filip Krajinović | 1–6, 6–3, 6–4 |

=== Doubles ===
| Year | Champions | Runners-up | Score |
|---|---|---|---|
| 2017 | (Slovakia) Martin Kližan (Slovakia) Jozef Kovalík | (Belgium) Sander Gillé (Belgium) Joran Vliegen | 6–3, 7–6^{(7–5)} |
| 2016 | (Italy) Federico Gaio (Italy) Stefano Napolitano | (Croatia) Marin Draganja (Croatia) Tomislav Draganja | 6–7^{(2–7)}, 6–2, [10–3] |
| 2015 | (Poland) Tomasz Bednarek (Poland) Mateusz Kowalczyk | (Spain) Íñigo Cervantes (Netherlands) Mark Vervoort | 6–2, 6–1 |
