= 2021 WTA German Open =

- Date: 14–20 June
- Edition: 98th
- Category: WTA 500
- Draw: 32S / 28Q / 16D
- Prize money: $565,530
- Surface: Grass
- Location: Berlin, Germany

Champions

Singles
- (Russia) Liudmila Samsonova

Doubles
- (Belarus) Victoria Azarenka / (Belarus) Aryna Sabalenka
- WTA German Open

The 2021 WTA German Open (also known as the bett1open for sponsorship purposes) was a professional tennis tournament played on outdoor grass courts at the Rot-Weiss Tennis Club in Berlin, Germany from 14 June to 21 June 2021. It was the 98th edition of the event on the 2021 WTA Tour and was classified as a WTA 500 tournament.

The 2021 relaunch of the German Open marked the first time the WTA Tour returned to Berlin since 2008 after the Qatar Tennis Federation, owners of the original clay tournament usually held prior to the French Open, had sold the sanction back to the Tour. In 2019, the WTA and All England Lawn Tennis and Croquet Club (AELTC) announced that the WTA Premier (now WTA 500) sanction from the Birmingham Classic would be transferred to a new grass tournament planned to be organized in Berlin. Originally scheduled for a debut in 2020, the inaugural edition was postponed to 2021 due to the COVID-19 pandemic in Germany.

Liudmila Samsonova became the relaunched tournament's debut singles champion after entering the main draw as a qualifier and defeating Belinda Bencic in her maiden WTA Tour career final. The all-Belarusian doubles team of Victoria Azarenka and Aryna Sabalenka defeated Nicole Melichar and Demi Schuurs in the final to win the new event's first doubles tournament.

== Finals ==
=== Singles ===
(Russia) Liudmila Samsonova defeated (Switzerland) Belinda Bencic, 1–6, 6–1, 6–3

- It was Samsonova's only singles title of the year and the 1st of her career.

=== Doubles ===
(Belarus) Victoria Azarenka / (Belarus) Aryna Sabalenka defeated (United States) Nicole Melichar / (Netherlands) Demi Schuurs, 4–6, 7–5, [10–4]

== Singles main-draw entrants ==
=== Seeds ===
| Country | Player | Rank | Seed |
|---|---|---|---|
| BLR | Aryna Sabalenka | 4 | 1 |
| UKR | Elina Svitolina | 6 | 2 |
| CAN | Bianca Andreescu | 7 | 3 |
| CZE | Karolína Plíšková | 10 | 4 |
| SUI | Belinda Bencic | 11 | 5 |
| ESP | Garbiñe Muguruza | 13 | 6 |
| BLR | Victoria Azarenka | 16 | 7 |
| CZE | Karolína Muchová | 19 | 8 |

- Rankings are as of May 31, 2021.

=== Other entrants ===
The following players received wildcards into the singles main draw:

- (Russia) Anna Kalinskaya
- (Germany) Andrea Petkovic

The following players received entry from the qualifying draw:

- (United States) Hailey Baptiste
- (Japan) Misaki Doi
- (Poland) Magdalena Fręch
- (United States) Asia Muhammad
- (Germany) Jule Niemeier
- (Russia) Liudmila Samsonova

=== Withdrawals ===
Before the tournament

- (Australia) Ashleigh Barty → replaced by (United States) Madison Keys
- (United States) Jennifer Brady → replaced by (Germany) Angelique Kerber
- (United States) Sofia Kenin → replaced by (United States) Jessica Pegula
- (Czech Republic) Petra Kvitová → replaced by (United States) Shelby Rogers
- (Japan) Naomi Osaka → replaced by (Croatia) Petra Martić
- (Greece) Maria Sakkari → replaced by (Russia) Veronika Kudermetova
- (Poland) Iga Świątek → replaced by (Russia) Ekaterina Alexandrova

== Doubles main-draw entrants ==
=== Seeds ===
| Country | Player | Country | Player | Rank^{1} | Seed |
|---|---|---|---|---|---|
| USA | Nicole Melichar | NED | Demi Schuurs | 19 | 1 |
| JPN | Shuko Aoyama | JPN | Ena Shibahara | 26 | 2 |
| CHI | Alexa Guarachi | USA | Desirae Krawczyk | 32 | 3 |
| BLR | Aryna Sabalenka | BLR | Victoria Azarenka | 52 | 4 |

- ^{1} Rankings are as of 31 May 2021.

=== Other entrants ===
The following pairs received wildcards into the doubles main draw:

- (Germany) Julia Middendorf / (Germany) Noma Noha Akugue
- (Spain) Garbiñe Muguruza / (Germany) Andrea Petkovic

=== Withdrawals ===
Before the tournament

- (Russia) Veronika Kudermetova / (Russia) Elena Vesnina → replaced by (Russia) Veronika Kudermetova / (Czech Republic) Markéta Vondroušová
