= 2022 WTA German Open =

- Date: 13–19 June
- Edition: 99th
- Category: WTA 500
- Draw: 32S / 28Q / 16D
- Prize money: $757,900
- Surface: Grass
- Location: Berlin, Germany
- Venue: Rot-Weiss Tennis Club

Champions

Singles
- (Tunisia) Ons Jabeur

Doubles
- (Australia) Storm Sanders / (Czech Republic) Kateřina Siniaková
- WTA German Open

The 2022 WTA German Open (also known as the bett1open for sponsorship purposes) was a professional tennis tournament played on outdoor grass courts at the Rot-Weiss Tennis Club in Berlin, Germany from 13 June to 19 June 2022. It was the 99th edition of the event on the 2022 WTA Tour, the second year it has been organized on grass, and was classified as a WTA 500 tournament.

== Finals ==
=== Singles ===
- (Tunisia) Ons Jabeur defeated (Switzerland) Belinda Bencic, 6–3, 2–1, ret.

This was Jabeur's third WTA singles title, and second of the year.

=== Doubles ===
- (Australia) Storm Sanders / (Czech Republic) Kateřina Siniaková defeated (France) Alizé Cornet / (Switzerland) Jil Teichmann 6–4, 6–3

== Point distribution ==
Event	W	F	SF	QF	Round of 16	Round of 32	Q	Q2	Q1
Singles	470	305	185	100	55	1	25	13	1
Doubles	470	305	185	100	1	—N/a	—N/a	—N/a	—N/a

== Singles main-draw entrants ==
=== Seeds ===
Country	Player	Rank	Seed
TUN	Ons Jabeur	4	1
GRE	Maria Sakkari	5	2
	Aryna Sabalenka	6	3
CZE	Karolína Plíšková	7	4
ESP	Garbiñe Muguruza	10	5
	Daria Kasatkina	12	6
USA	Coco Gauff	13	7
SUI	Belinda Bencic	17	8

- Rankings are as of 6 June 2022.

=== Other entrants ===
The following players received wildcards into the singles main draw:

- Anna Kalinskaya
- (Germany) Jule Niemeier

The following players received entry using a protected ranking into the singles main draw:

- (Canada) Bianca Andreescu
- (Czech Republic) Karolína Muchová

The following players received entry from the qualifying draw:

- Anastasia Gasanova
- (France) Léolia Jeanjean
- (Germany) Tamara Korpatsch
- (United States) Alycia Parks
- (Australia) Daria Saville
- (China) Wang Xinyu

=== Withdrawals ===
Before the tournament

- Victoria Azarenka → replaced by (Estonia) Kaia Kanepi
- (Spain) Paula Badosa → replaced by Aliaksandra Sasnovich
- (United States) Danielle Collins → replaced by Liudmila Samsonova
- (Canada) Leylah Fernandez → replaced by Ekaterina Alexandrova
- (United States) Sofia Kenin → replaced by Veronika Kudermetova
- (United States) Madison Keys → replaced by (Czech Republic) Kateřina Siniaková
- (Estonia) Anett Kontaveit → replaced by (Germany) Andrea Petkovic
- (United States) Jessica Pegula → replaced by (Ukraine) Anhelina Kalinina
- (Kazakhstan) Elena Rybakina → replaced by (United States) Ann Li
- (Poland) Iga Świątek → replaced by (France) Alizé Cornet

== Doubles main-draw entrants ==
=== Seeds ===
Country	Player	Country	Player	Rank^{1}	Seed
AUS	Storm Sanders	CZE	Kateřina Siniaková	20	1
CAN	Gabriela Dabrowski	MEX	Giuliana Olmos	20	2
USA	Asia Muhammad	JPN	Ena Shibahara	43	3
CHI	Alexa Guarachi	SLO	Andreja Klepač	46	4

- ^{1} Rankings are as of 6 June 2022.

=== Other entrants ===
The following pairs received wildcards into the doubles main draw:

- (Canada) Bianca Andreescu / (Germany) Sabine Lisicki
- (Germany) Jule Niemeier / (Germany) Andrea Petkovic

The following pair received entry as alternates:

- (China) Han Xinyun / Alexandra Panova

=== Withdrawals ===
Before the tournament

- Natela Dzalamidze / Kamilla Rakhimova → replaced by (United States) Kaitlyn Christian / Lidziya Marozava
- (United States) Desirae Krawczyk / (Netherlands) Demi Schuurs → replaced by Anna Kalinskaya / (United States) Desirae Krawczyk
- Veronika Kudermetova / Aryna Sabalenka → replaced by (China) Han Xinyun / Alexandra Panova
