= 2022 WTA German Open – Singles =

Singles
- 2022 WTA German Open

Final
- Champion: (Tunisia) Ons Jabeur
- Runner-up: (Switzerland) Belinda Bencic
- Score: 6–3, 2–1, ret.

Details
- Draw: 32 (6 Q / 2 WC )
- Seeds: 8

Events
Singles	Doubles
← 2021 ·	WTA German Open	· 2023 →

Ons Jabeur won the singles tennis title at the 2022 German Open after Belinda Bencic retired with an ankle injury from the final with the score at 6–3, 2–1.

Liudmila Samsonova was the defending champion, but lost in the second round to Veronika Kudermetova.

== Seeds ==
1. (Tunisia) Ons Jabeur (champion)
2. (Greece) Maria Sakkari (semifinals)
3. Aryna Sabalenka (first round)
4. (Czech Republic) Karolína Plíšková (quarterfinals)
5. (Spain) Garbiñe Muguruza (first round)
6. Daria Kasatkina (quarterfinals)
7. (United States) Coco Gauff (semifinals)
8. (Switzerland) Belinda Bencic (final, retired)

== Draw ==
=== Key ===
- Q = Qualifier
- WC = Wild card
- LL = Lucky loser
- Alt = Alternate
- SE = Special exempt
- PR = Protected ranking
- ITF = ITF entry
- JE = Junior exempt
- w/o = Walkover
- r = Retired
- d = Defaulted
- SR = Special ranking

=== Finals ===
Semifinals
1	(Tunisia) Ons Jabeur	7^{7}	6
7	(United States) Coco Gauff	6^{4}	2
8	(Switzerland) Belinda Bencic	6^{6}	6	6
2	(Greece) Maria Sakkari	7^{8}	4	4

Final
1	(Tunisia) Ons Jabeur	6	2
8	(Switzerland) Belinda Bencic	3	1^{r}

=== Top half ===
First round
1	(Tunisia) O Jabeur	6	6
PR	(Czech Republic) K Muchová	3	3
(China) Q Zheng	3	6^{4}
Q	(United States) A Parks	6	7^{7}
Q	A Gasanova	2	6	3
A Sasnovich	6	4	6
(Germany) A Petkovic	7^{10}	6
5	(Spain) G Muguruza	6^{8}	4
4	(Czech Republic) Ka Plíšková	6^{5}	6	6
(Estonia) K Kanepi	7^{7}	0	0
(Czech Republic) K Siniaková	4	6	4
PR	(Canada) B Andreescu	6	4	6
Q	(Germany) T Korpatsch	6	3	4
Q	(China) Xin Wang	3	6	6
(United States) A Li	2	6^{2}
7	(United States) C Gauff	6	7^{7}

Second round
1	(Tunisia) O Jabeur	6	7^{10}
Q	(United States) A Parks	2	6^{8}
A Sasnovich	6	6
(Germany) A Petkovic	4	4
4	(Czech Republic) Ka Plíšková	6	2	7^{9}
PR	(Canada) B Andreescu	4	6	6^{7}
Q	(China) Xin Wang	0	4
7	(United States) C Gauff	6	6

Quarterfinals
1	(Tunisia) O Jabeur	6^{3}	6	6
A Sasnovich	7^{7}	2	2
4	(Czech Republic) Ka Plíšková	5	4
7	(United States) C Gauff	7	6

Semifinals
1	(Tunisia) O Jabeur	7^{7}	6
7	(United States) C Gauff	6^{4}	2

=== Bottom half ===
First round
8	(Switzerland) B Bencic	6	5	6
WC	(Germany) J Niemeier	4	7	3
WC	A Kalinskaya	6	6
(France) A Cornet	4	4
(Slovenia) T Zidanšek	5	1
L Samsonova	7	6
V Kudermetova	2	7	6
3	A Sabalenka	6	5	4
6	D Kasatkina	5	6	6
(Ukraine) A Kalinina	7	3	1
(Belgium) M Zanevska	3	4
E Alexandrova	6	6
(Switzerland) J Teichmann	7^{7}	5	2
Q	(Australia) D Saville	6^{2}	7	6
Q	(France) L Jeanjean	3	2
2	(Greece) M Sakkari	6	6

Second round
8	(Switzerland) B Bencic	6	1	6
WC	A Kalinskaya	4	6	1
L Samsonova	3	7^{7}	1
V Kudermetova	6	6^{5}	6
6	D Kasatkina	5	6	6
E Alexandrova	7	1	1
Q	(Australia) D Saville	1	5
2	(Greece) M Sakkari	6	7

Quarterfinals
8	(Switzerland) B Bencic	3	6	6
V Kudermetova	6	3	3
6	D Kasatkina	0	3
2	(Greece) M Sakkari	6	6

Semifinals
8	(Switzerland) B Bencic	6^{6}	6	6
2	(Greece) M Sakkari	7^{8}	4	4

== Qualifying ==
=== Seeds ===
1. (China) Wang Xinyu (qualified)
2. (Australia) Daria Saville (qualified)
3. (Germany) Tamara Korpatsch (qualified)
4. Kamilla Rakhimova (qualifying competition)
5. (France) Léolia Jeanjean (qualified)
6. Anastasia Gasanova (qualified)
7. (United States) Asia Muhammad (first round)
8. (Germany) Nastasja Schunk (first round)
9. (United States) Alycia Parks (qualified)
10. (Netherlands) Suzan Lamens (first round)
11. (Uzbekistan) Nigina Abduraimova (qualifying competition)
12. (Switzerland) Stefanie Vögele (qualifying competition)

=== Qualifiers ===
1. (China) Wang Xinyu
2. (Australia) Daria Saville
3. (Germany) Tamara Korpatsch
4. (United States) Alycia Parks
5. (France) Léolia Jeanjean
6. Anastasia Gasanova

=== Qualifying draw ===
==== First qualifier ====
First round
1	(China) Wang Xinyu	6	6
Alt	Ekaterina Kazionova	4	1
WC	(Germany) Anna-Lena Friedsam	6	3	6
10	(Netherlands) Suzan Lamens	3	6	4

Qualifying competition
1	(China) Wang Xinyu	4	6	6
WC	(Germany) Anna-Lena Friedsam	6	3	3

==== Second qualifier ====
First round
2/PR	(Australia) Daria Saville	7	6
WC	(Germany) Noma Noha Akugue	5	4
WC	(Germany) Sabine Lisicki	6	6
7	(United States) Asia Muhammad	4	4

Qualifying competition
2/PR	(Australia) Daria Saville	6	7^{9}
WC	(Germany) Sabine Lisicki	0	6^{7}

==== Third qualifier ====
First round
3	(Germany) Tamara Korpatsch	6	6
Alt	(Germany) Lena Papadakis	2	3
(Australia) Storm Sanders	6	6
8	(Germany) Nastasja Schunk	1	2

Qualifying competition
3	(Germany) Tamara Korpatsch	7^{9}	6
(Australia) Storm Sanders	6^{7}	0

==== Fourth qualifier ====
First round
4	Kamilla Rakhimova	6	6
(Bulgaria) Isabella Shinikova	3	4
(Norway) Ulrikke Eikeri	3	4
9	(United States) Alycia Parks	6	6

Qualifying competition
4	Kamilla Rakhimova	6	4	4
9	(United States) Alycia Parks	2	6	6

==== Fifth qualifier ====
First round
5/WC	(France) Léolia Jeanjean	6	6
(Serbia) Natalija Stevanović	2	4
PR	(China) Han Xinyun	1	5
12	(Switzerland) Stefanie Vögele	6	7

Qualifying competition
5/WC	(France) Léolia Jeanjean	6	7^{7}
12	(Switzerland) Stefanie Vögele	3	6^{5}

==== Sixth qualifier ====
First round
6	Anastasia Gasanova	4	7^{8}	6
(Germany) Eva Lys	6	6^{6}	2
Ekaterina Makarova	6	5	4
11	(Uzbekistan) Nigina Abduraimova	3	7	6

Qualifying competition
6	Anastasia Gasanova	7	6
11	(Uzbekistan) Nigina Abduraimova	5	2

== External sources ==
- Main draw
- Qualifying draw
