= Liudmila Samsonova career statistics =

Russian tennis player

Career finals
Discipline	Type	Won	Lost	Total
Singles	Grand Slam	–	–	–
Singles	Summer Olympics	–	–	–
Singles	WTA Finals	–	–	–
Singles	WTA 1000	0	2	2
Singles	WTA 500	2	2	4
Singles	WTA 250	3	0	3
Singles	Total	5	4	9
Doubles	Grand Slam	–	–	–
Doubles	Summer Olympics	–	–	–
Doubles	WTA Finals	–	–	–
Doubles	WTA 1000	1	0	1
Doubles	WTA Tour	3	0	3
Doubles	Total	4	0	4

This is a list of the main career statistics of professional Russian tennis player Liudmila Samsonova.

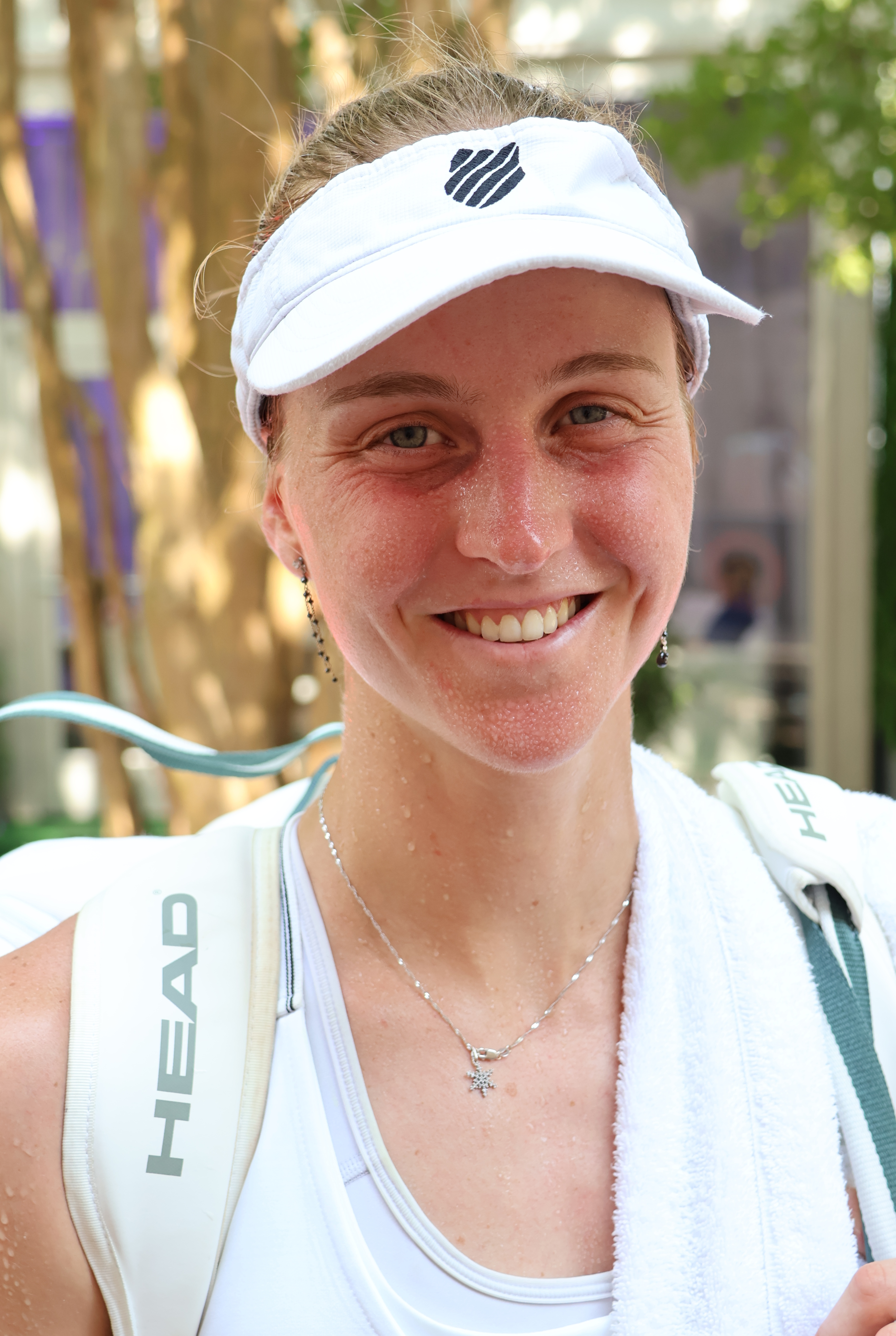
Samsonova at the 2023 Washington Open.

== Performance timelines ==
Key
W	F	SF	QF	#R	RR	Q#	DNQ	A	NH

(W) winner; (F) finalist; (SF) semifinalist; (QF) quarterfinalist; (#R) rounds 4, 3, 2, 1; (RR) round-robin stage; (Q#) qualification round; (DNQ) did not qualify; (A) absent; (NH) not held; (SR) strike rate (events won / competed); (W–L) win–loss record.
To avoid confusion and double counting, these charts are updated at the conclusion of a tournament or when the player's participation has ended.

Only main-draw results in WTA Tour, Grand Slam tournaments, Billie Jean King Cup, United Cup, Hopman Cup and Olympic Games are included in win–loss records.

=== Singles ===
Current through the 2026 Wimbledon Championships.

Tournaments	2019	2020	2021	2022	2023	2024	2025	2026	SR	W–L	Win%
Grand Slam tournaments
Australian Open	Q2	1R	2R	2R	2R	1R	2R	1R	0 / 7	4–7	36%
French Open	1R	1R	Q1	1R	2R	3R	4R	1R	0 / 7	6–7	46%
Wimbledon	Q3	NH	4R	A (Note: Suspended due to the ban of Russian and Belarusian athletes in light of the Russian invasion of Ukraine.)	1R	3R	QF	3R	0 / 5	11–5	69%
US Open	Q2	1R	2R	4R	3R	4R	2R	1R	0 / 7	10–7	59%
Win–loss	0–1	0–3	5–3	4–3	4–4	7–4	9–4	2–4	0 / 26	31–26	54%
Year-end championships
WTA Elite Trophy	DNQ	Not held			RR	Not held			0 / 1	1–1	50%
National representation
Billie Jean King Cup (Note: Formerly known as Fed Cup until 2020.)	A	W (Note: Edition is split into the two years due to COVID-19.)		DQ					1 / 1	2–0	100%
WTA 1000 tournaments
Qatar Open	NTI	Q2	NTI	1R	NTI	1R	2R	1R	0 / 4	1–4	20%
Dubai Championships	Q2	NTI	A	NTI	3R	3R	2R	1R	0 / 4	3–4	43%
Indian Wells Open	A	NH	2R	4R	2R	2R	QF	2R	0 / 6	6–6	50%
Miami Open	A	NH	3R	2R	3R	2R	2R	2R	0 / 6	3–6	33%
Madrid Open	A	NH	A	1R	4R	3R	3R	3R	0 / 5	4–5	44%
Italian Open	A	Q1	Q1	1R	3R	2R	2R	2R	0 / 5	2–5	29%
Canadian Open	A	NH	2R	A	F	QF	2R	4R	0 / 5	11–5	69%
Cincinnati Open	A	Q2	1R	A	1R	QF	2R	2R	0 / 5	4–5	44%
China Open	A	NH			F	2R	2R		0 / 3	5–3	63%
Wuhan Open	A	NH				1R	3R		0 / 2	2–2	50%
Guadalajara Open	NH			3R	A	NTI			0 / 1	2–1	67%
Win–loss	0–0	0–0	4–4	4–6	15–8	7–10	8–10	2–5	0 / 44	40–43	48%
Career statistics
	2019	2020	2021	2022	2023	2024	2025	2026	SR	W–L	Win%
Tournaments	6	6	18	19	24	22	22	16	Career total: 130		
Titles	0	0	1	3	0	1	0	0	Career total: 5		
Finals	0	0	1	3	3	1	1	0	Career total: 9		
Hard win–loss	0–2	1–4	14–12	25–9	26–16	12–13	14–14	8–11	3 / 84	100–81	55%
Clay win–loss	4–3	1–2	2–4	3–4	4–4	6–5	8–5	3–4	0 / 32	31–31	50%
Grass win–loss	0–1	0–0	8–1	1–3	4–4	8–3	7–3	1–2	2 / 19	29–17	63%
Overall win–loss	4–6	2–6	24–17	29–16	34–24	26–21	29–22	12–17	5 / 135	160–129	55%
Win %	40%	25%	59%	64%	59%	55%	57%	41%	Career total: 55%		
Year-end ranking (Note: 2014: WTA ranking–864, 2015: WTA ranking–n/a, 2016: WTA ranking–1078, 2017: WTA ranking–552, 2018: WTA ranking–180,)	139	127	39	20	16	27	17		$9,310,514		

=== Doubles ===
Current through the 2023 WTA Tour.

Tournaments	2019	2020	2021	2022	2023	SR	W–L	Win%
Grand Slam tournaments
Australian Open	A	A	A	1R	1R	0 / 2	0–2	0%
French Open	A	A	A	1R	QF	0 / 2	3–2	60%
Wimbledon	A	NH	A	A	A	0 / 0	0–0	–
US Open	A	A	1R	1R	2R	0 / 3	1–3	25%
Win–loss	0–0	0–0	0–1	0–3	4–3	0 / 7	4–7	36%
National representation
Billie Jean King Cup	A	W (Note: Edition is split into the two years due to COVID-19.)		DQ		1 / 1	3–0	100%
WTA 1000 tournaments
Qatar Open	NTI	A	NTI	A	NTI	0 / 0	0–0	–
Dubai Championships	A	NTI	A	NTI	W	1 / 1	5–0	100%
Indian Wells Open	A	NH	A	A	1R	0 / 1	0–1	0%
Miami Open	A	NH	A	A	2R	0 / 1	1–1	50%
Madrid Open	A	NH	A	1R	1R	0 / 2	0–2	0%
Italian Open	A	A	A	2R (Note: Withdrew during the tournament. Not counted as a loss.)	A	0 / 1	1–0	100%
Canadian Open	A	NH	A	1R	A	0 / 1	0–1	0%
Cincinnati Open	A	A	A	A	A	0 / 0	0–0	–
China Open	A	NH			A	0 / 0	0–0	–
Wuhan Open	A	NH				0 / 0	0–0	–
Win–loss	0–0	0–0	0–0	1–2	6–3	1 / 7	7–5	58%
Career statistics
	2019	2020	2021	2022	2023	SR	W–L	Win%
Tournaments	1	0	2	10	9	Career total: 22		
Titles	0	0	0	0	1	Career total: 1		
Finals	0	0	0	0	1	Career total: 1		
Hard win–loss	0–1	0–0	3–2	3–5	9–5	1 / 15	15–13	54%
Clay win–loss	0–0	0–0	0–0	1–2	3–2	0 / 5	4–4	50%
Grass win–loss	0–0	0–0	0–0	0–1	0–1	0 / 2	0–2	0%
Overall win–loss	0–1	0–0	3–2	4–8	12–8	1 / 22	19–19	50%
Win %	0%	–	60%	33%	60%	Career total: 50%		
Year-end ranking (Note: 2014: WTA ranking-1154, 2015: WTA ranking-1012, 2016: WTA ranking-818, 2017: WTA ranking-791, 2018: WTA ranking-841.)	n/a	n/a	1348	197	45			

== WTA 1000 finals ==
=== Singles: 2 (2 runner-ups) ===
Result	Year	Tournament	Surface	Opponent	Score
Loss	2023	Canadian Open	Hard	(United States) Jessica Pegula	1–6, 0–6
Loss	2023	China Open	Hard	(Poland) Iga Świątek	2–6, 2–6

=== Doubles: 1 (title) ===
Result	Year	Tournament	Surface	Partner	Opponents	Score
Win	2023	Dubai Championships	Hard	Veronika Kudermetova	(Chinese Taipei) Chan Hao-ching (Chinese Taipei) Latisha Chan	6–4, 6–7^{(4–7)}, [10–1]

== WTA Tour finals ==
=== Singles: 9 (5 titles, 4 runner-ups) ===
Legend WTA 1000 (0–2) WTA 500 (2–2) WTA 250 (3–0)	Finals by surface Hard (3–3) Clay (0–1) Grass (2–0)	Finals by setting Outdoor (5–4)

Result	W–L	Date	Tournament	Tier	Surface	Opponent	Score
Win	1–0	Jun 2021	Berlin Open, Germany	WTA 500	Grass	(Switzerland) Belinda Bencic	1–6, 6–1, 6–3
Win	2–0	Aug 2022	Washington Open, United States	WTA 250	Hard	(Estonia) Kaia Kanepi	4–6, 6–3, 6–3
Win	3–0	Aug 2022	Tennis in Cleveland, United States	WTA 250	Hard	Aliaksandra Sasnovich	6–1, 6–3
Win	4–0	Sep 2022	Pan Pacific Open, Japan	WTA 500	Hard	(China) Zheng Qinwen	7–5, 7–5
Loss	4–1	Feb 2023	Abu Dhabi Open, UAE	WTA 500	Hard	(Switzerland) Belinda Bencic	6–1, 6–7^{(8–10)}, 4–6
Loss	4–2	Aug 2023	Canadian Open, Canada	WTA 1000	Hard	(United States) Jessica Pegula	1–6, 0–6
Loss	4–3	Oct 2023	China Open, China	WTA 1000	Hard	(Poland) Iga Świątek	2–6, 2–6
Win	5–3	Jun 2024	Rosmalen Open, Netherlands	WTA 250	Grass	(Canada) Bianca Andreescu	4–6, 6–3, 7–5
Loss	5–4	May 2025	Internationaux de Strasbourg, France	WTA 500	Clay	(Kazakhstan) Elena Rybakina	1–6, 7–6^{(7–2)}, 1–6

=== Doubles: 4 (4 titles) ===
Legend WTA 1000 (1–0) WTA 500 (3–0)	Finals by surface Hard (3–0) Clay (1–0)	Finals by setting Outdoor (3–0) Indoor (1–0)

Result	W–L	Date	Tournament	Tier	Surface	Partner	Opponents	Score
Win	1–0	Feb 2023	Dubai Championships, UAE	WTA 1000	Hard	Veronika Kudermetova	(Chinese Taipei) Chan Hao-ching (Chinese Taipei) Latisha Chan	6–4, 6–7^{(4–7)}, [10–1]
Win	2–0	Sep 2024	Korea Open, South Korea	WTA 500	Hard	(United States) Nicole Melichar-Martinez	(China) Zhang Shuai (Japan) Miyu Kato	6–1, 6–0
Win	3–0	Oct 2025	Ningbo Open, China	WTA 500	Hard	(United States) Nicole Melichar-Martinez	(Hungary) Tímea Babos (Brazil) Luisa Stefani	5–7, 6–4, [10–8]
Win	4–0	Apr 2026	Stuttgart Open, Germany	WTA 500	Clay (i)	(United States) Nicole Melichar-Martinez	(Latvia) Jeļena Ostapenko (China) Zhang Shuai	6–1, 6–1

== ITF Circuit finals ==
=== Singles: 11 (4 titles, 7 runner-ups) ===
Legend
W80 tournaments (0–1)
W60 tournaments (1–0)
W25 tournaments (1–2)
W10/15 tournaments (2–4)

Result	W–L	Date	Tournament	Tier	Surface	Opponent	Score
Win	1–0	Jun 2014	ITF Rome, Italy	W10	Clay	(Switzerland) Tess Sugnaux	6–2, 2–6, 6–4
Win	2–0	Nov 2016	ITF Solarino, Italy	W10	Carpet	(Netherlands) Kelly Versteeg	3–6, 6–0, 6–1
Loss	2–1	Mar 2017	ITF Mâcon, France	W15	Hard (i)	(France) Mallaurie Noël	5–7, 2–6
Loss	2–2	May 2017	ITF Pula, Italy	W15	Clay	(Chile) Fernanda Brito	3–6, 3–6
Loss	2–3	Dec 2017	ITF Hammamet, Tunisia	W15	Clay	(Russia) Daria Lodikova	6–7^{(8–10)}, 4–6
Loss	2–4	Mar 2018	ITF Sharm El Sheikh, Egypt	W15	Hard	(Bulgaria) Julia Terziyska	7–6^{(7–4)}, 0–6, 6–7^{(4–7)}
Loss	2–5	Jun 2018	ITF Padua, Italy	W25	Clay	(France) Fiona Ferro	5–7, 3–6
Win	3–5	Aug 2018	ITF El Espinar, Spain	W25	Hard	(Turkey) Başak Eraydın	6–2, 6–0
Win	4–5	Sep 2018	Open de Saint-Malo, France	W60+H	Clay	(Ukraine) Katarina Zavatska	6–0, 6–2
Loss	4–6	Oct 2019	Internationaux de Poitiers, France	W80	Hard (i)	(Serbia) Nina Stojanović	2–6, 6–7^{(2–7)}
Loss	4–7	Oct 2020	ITF Reims, France	W25	Hard (i)	(France) Océane Dodin	4–6, 2–6

=== Doubles: 3 (2 titles, 1 runner-up) ===
Legend
W10/15 tournaments (2–1)

Result	W–L	Date	Tournament	Tier	Surface	Partner	Opponents	Score
Win	1–0	Sep 2015	ITF Pula, Italy	W10	Clay	(Italy) Bianca Turati	(Belgium) India Maggen (Switzerland) Tess Sugnaux	6–4, 6–2
Win	2–0	Aug 2016	ITF Tarvisio, Italy	W10	Clay	(Italy) Chiara Quattrone	(Italy) Angelica Moratelli (Italy) Anna-Giulia Remondina	3–6, 6–4, [10–6]
Loss	2–1	Dec 2017	ITF Cordenons, Italy	W15	Clay (i)	(Italy) Lucia Bronzetti	(Italy) Federica di Sarra (Italy) Michele Alexandra Zmău	2–6, 6–1, [8–10]

== Billie Jean King Cup participation ==
=== Singles (2–0) ===
Edition	Round	Date	Location	Against	Surface	Opponent	W/L	Result
2020–21	F SF	Nov 2021	Prague (CZE)	United States	Hard (i)	Sloane Stephens	W	1–6, 6–4, 6–3
2020–21	F F	Nov 2021	Prague (CZE)	Switzerland	Hard (i)	Belinda Bencic	W	3–6, 6–3, 6–4

=== Doubles (3–0) ===
Edition	Round	Date	Location	Against	Surface	Partner	Opponents	W/L	Result
2020–21	F RR	Nov 2021	Prague (CZE)	Canada	Hard (i)	Veronika Kudermetova	Gabriela Dabrowski; Rebecca Marino	W	6–3, 6–1
2020–21	F RR	Nov 2021	Prague (CZE)	France	Hard (i)	Veronika Kudermetova	Clara Burel; Alizé Cornet	W	6–2, 6–1
2020–21	F SF	Nov 2021	Prague (CZE)	United States	Hard (i)	Veronika Kudermetova	Shelby Rogers; CoCo Vandeweghe	W	6–3, 6–3

== WTA Tour career earnings ==
Current through the 2024 Internationaux de Strasbourg.

Year	Grand Slam singles titles	WTA singles titles	Total singles titles	Earnings ($)	Money list rank
2015	0	0	0	1,539	1260
2016	0	0	0	1,772	1169
2017	0	0	0	7,209	694
2018	0	0	0	27,122	351
2019	0	0	0	170,673	177
2020	0	0	0	243,258	106
2021	0	1	1	695,255	48
2022	0	3	3	970,946	41
2023	0	0	0	2,248,286	14
2024	0	0	0	394,145	52
Career	0	4	4	4,770,191	151

== Career Grand Slam statistics ==
=== Seedings ===
The tournaments won by Samsonova are in boldface, and advanced into finals by Samsonova are in italics.

Year	Australian Open	French Open	Wimbledon	US Open
2019	did not qualify	qualifier	did not qualify	did not qualify
2020	qualifier	not seeded	cancelled	not seeded
2021	qualifier	did not qualify	wild card	not seeded
2022	not seeded	25th	absent/expelled	not seeded
2023	18th	15th	15th	14th
2024	13th	17th	15th	16th
2025	25th	19th		

== Head-to-head records ==
=== Record against top 10 players ===
- Samsonova has a 10–16 (38%) record against players who were, at the time the match was played, ranked in the top 10.

#	Opponent	Rk	Event	Surface	Rd	Score	Rk	Ref
**2022**
1.	(Czech Republic) Karolína Plíšková	7	Stuttgart Open, Germany	Clay (i)	2R	6–4, 6–4	31	
2.	(United Kingdom) Emma Raducanu	10	Washington Open, United States	Hard	QF	7–6^{(8–6)}, 6–1	60	
3.	Aryna Sabalenka	4	Guadalajara Open, Mexico	Hard	2R	6–4, 2–6, 6–2	22	
**2023**
4.	Aryna Sabalenka	2	Canadian Open, Canada	Hard	3R	7–6^{(7–2)}, 4–6, 6–3	18	
5.	(Kazakhstan) Elena Rybakina	4	Canadian Open, Canada	Hard	SF	1–6, 6–1, 6–2	18	
6.	(Kazakhstan) Elena Rybakina	5	China Open, China	Hard	SF	7–6^{(9–7)}, 6–3	22	
**2025**
7.	(United States) Emma Navarro	8	Adelaide International, Australia	Hard	QF	6–4, 6–4	26	
8.	(Italy) Jasmine Paolini	6	Indian Wells Open, United States	Hard	4R	6–0, 6–4	25	
9.	(Spain) Paula Badosa	10	Internationaux de Strasbourg, France	Clay	QF	6–4, 3–6, 6–4	19	
10.	(United States) Jessica Pegula	3	German Open, Germany	Grass	2R	6–7^{(8–10)}, 7–5, 7–6^{(7–5)}	20	
**2026**
11.	(Ukraine) Marta Kostyuk	10	Guadalajara Open, Mexico	Hard	QF	4–6, 6–2, 7–5	50	

=== Double-bagel matches ===
Result	W–L	Year	Tournament	Tier	Surface	Opponent	Rank	Rd	Rk
Win	1–0	2017	ITF Solarino, Italy	15,000	Carpet	(Italy) Maria Viviani	N/A	1R	755
Win	2–0	2017	ITF Torino, Italy	25,000	Clay	(Italy) Anna Turati	N/A	Q1	614
Win	3–0	2018	ITF Pula, Italy	25,000	Clay	(Poland) Aleksandra Buczyńska	N/A	Q1	588
Win	4–0	2018	ITF Rome, Italy	25,000	Clay	(Italy) Carlotta Capanna	N/A	Q1	527
Win	5–0	2018	ITF Padova, Italy	25,000	Clay	(Italy) Francesca Covi	N/A	Q1	461
Win	6–0	2022	Stuttgart Open, Germany	WTA 500	Clay (i)	(France) Chloé Paquet	103	1R	31

== Longest winning streak ==
=== 13-match win streak (2022) ===
#	Tournament	Category	Start date	Surface	Rd	Opponent	Rank	Score
–	Bad Homburg Open	WTA 250	19 June 2022	Grass	1R	Kamilla Rakhimova (Q)	No. 111	6–7^{(6–8)}, 4–6
1	Washington Open	WTA 250	1 August 2022	Hard	1R	(Belgium) Elise Mertens (5)	No. 30	7–6^{(7–4)}, 6–4
2	Washington Open	WTA 250	1 August 2022	Hard	2R	(Australia) Ajla Tomljanović	No. 69	4–6, 6–3, 6–2
3	Washington Open	WTA 250	1 August 2022	Hard	QF	(United Kingdom) Emma Raducanu (2)	No. 10	7–6^{(8–6)}, 6–1
4	Washington Open	WTA 250	1 August 2022	Hard	SF	(China) Wang Xiyu (LL)	No. 95	6–1, 6–1
5	Washington Open	WTA 250	1 August 2022	Hard	**W (1)**	(Estonia) Kaia Kanepi (6)	No. 37	4–6, 6–3, 6–3
6	Tennis in the Land	WTA 250	21 August 2022	Hard	1R	Iryna Shymanovich (LL)	No. 322	6–1, 6–0
7	Tennis in the Land	WTA 250	21 August 2022	Hard	2R	(Germany) Laura Siegemund (Q)	No. 216	6–2, 6–1
8	Tennis in the Land	WTA 250	21 August 2022	Hard	QF	(Poland) Magda Linette	No. 67	6–4, 6–3
9	Tennis in the Land	WTA 250	21 August 2022	Hard	SF	(United States) Bernarda Pera	No. 51	6–1, 6–2
10	Tennis in the Land	WTA 250	21 August 2022	Hard	**W (2)**	Aliaksandra Sasnovich (7)	No. 36	6–1, 6–3
11	US Open	Grand Slam	29 August 2022	Hard	1R	(Czech Republic) Sára Bejlek (Q)	No. 209	6–3, 6–1
12	US Open	Grand Slam	29 August 2022	Hard	2R	(Canada) Leylah Fernandez (14)	No. 14	6–3, 7–6^{(7–3)}
13	US Open	Grand Slam	29 August 2022	Hard	3R	(Serbia) Aleksandra Krunić	No. 96	6–3, 6–3
–	US Open	Grand Slam	29 August 2022	Hard	4R	(Australia) Ajla Tomljanović	No. 46	6–7^{(8–10)}, 1–6

== Awards ==
International

- Billie Jean King Cup Finals:
  - Most Valuable Player: 2021.
  - Rookie of the Year: 2021.

National

- The Russian Cup in the nomination:
  - Team of the Year: 2021.
