= 2021 WTA German Open – Doubles =

Doubles
- 2021 WTA German Open

Final
- Champions: (Belarus) Victoria Azarenka (Belarus) Aryna Sabalenka
- Runners-up: (United States) Nicole Melichar (Netherlands) Demi Schuurs
- Score: 4–6, 7–5, [10–4]

Details
- Draw: 16
- Seeds: 4

Events
Singles	Doubles
← 2008 ·	WTA German Open	· 2022 →

Victoria Azarenka and Aryna Sabalenka defeated Nicole Melichar and Demi Schuurs in the final, 4–6, 7–5, [10–4], to win the doubles tennis title at the 2021 WTA German Open. It marked Azarenka's ninth career WTA Tour doubles title and Sabalenka's sixth.

Cara Black and Liezel Huber were the defending champions from when the tournament was last held in 2008, but both players had retired from professional tennis before the tournament's relaunch. As the inaugural edition of the tournament following its relaunch, this marked the first year the tournament was played on grass.

== Seeds ==
1. (United States) Nicole Melichar / (Netherlands) Demi Schuurs (final)
2. (Japan) Shuko Aoyama / (Japan) Ena Shibahara (first round)
3. (Chile) Alexa Guarachi / (United States) Desirae Krawczyk (quarterfinals)
4. (Belarus) Victoria Azarenka / (Belarus) Aryna Sabalenka (champions)

== Draw ==
=== Key ===
- Q = Qualifier
- WC = Wild card
- LL = Lucky loser
- Alt = Alternate
- SE = Special exempt
- PR = Protected ranking
- ITF = ITF entry
- JE = Junior exempt
- w/o = Walkover
- r = Retired
- d = Defaulted
- SR = Special ranking

=== Draw ===
First round
1	(United States) N Melichar (Netherlands) D Schuurs	6	6
(Germany) V Heisen (Czech Republic) K Peschke	4	2
(Japan) M Kato (Czech Republic) R Voráčová	6	4	[10]
(Russia) A Blinkova (Georgia (country)) O Kalashnikova	3	6	[2]
3	(Chile) A Guarachi (United States) D Krawczyk	6	6
WC	(Germany) J Middendorf (Germany) N Noha Akugue	3	2
(Germany) A-L Friedsam (Luxembourg) M Minella	5	3
(Russia) V Kudermetova (Czech Republic) M Vondroušová	7	6
(Croatia) D Jurak (Slovenia) A Klepač	1	6	[10]
(Croatia) P Martić (United States) S Rogers	6	3	[12]
(Czech Republic) K Muchová (Czech Republic) Ka Plíšková	1	3
4	(Belarus) V Azarenka (Belarus) A Sabalenka	6	6
(United States) A Muhammad (United States) J Pegula	2	6	[10]
WC	(Spain) G Muguruza (Germany) A Petkovic	6	3	[5]
(Canada) S Fichman (Mexico) G Olmos	6	6
2	(Japan) S Aoyama (Japan) E Shibahara	4	4

Quarterfinals
1	(United States) N Melichar (Netherlands) D Schuurs	6	6
(Japan) M Kato (Czech Republic) R Voráčová	1	3
3	(Chile) A Guarachi (United States) D Krawczyk	6^{4}	5
(Russia) V Kudermetova (Czech Republic) M Vondroušová	7^{7}	7
(Croatia) P Martić (United States) S Rogers	3	4
4	(Belarus) V Azarenka (Belarus) A Sabalenka	6	6
(United States) A Muhammad (United States) J Pegula	4	6	[5]
(Canada) S Fichman (Mexico) G Olmos	6	1	[10]

Semifinals
1	(United States) N Melichar (Netherlands) D Schuurs	7	6
(Russia) V Kudermetova (Czech Republic) M Vondroušová	5	3
4	(Belarus) V Azarenka (Belarus) A Sabalenka	7	3	[10]
(Canada) S Fichman (Mexico) G Olmos	5	6	[6]

Final
1	(United States) N Melichar (Netherlands) D Schuurs	6	5	[4]
4	(Belarus) V Azarenka (Belarus) A Sabalenka	4	7	[10]
