= Sabine Lisicki =

German tennis player (born 1989)

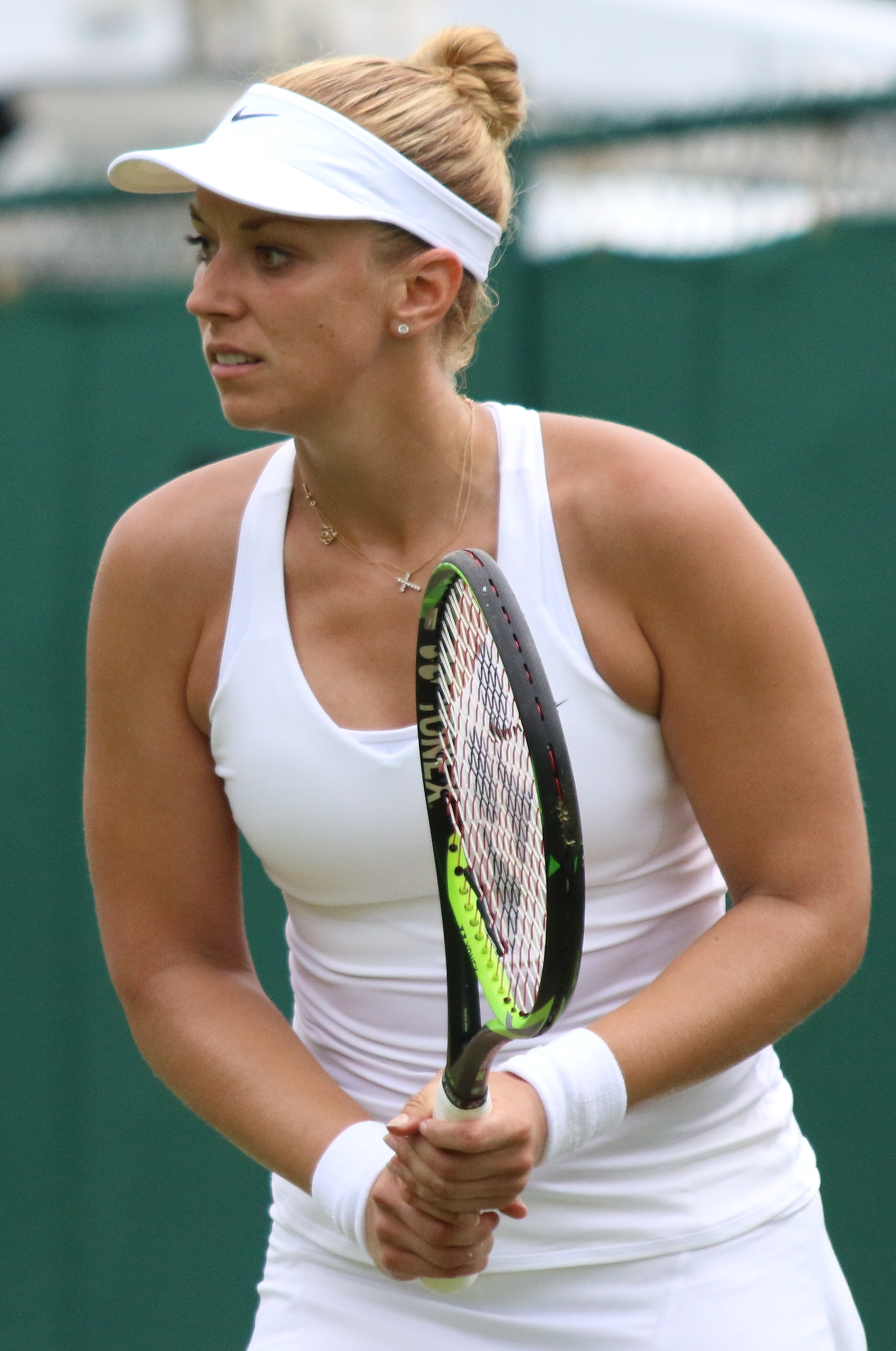
- Lisicki at the 2019 Wimbledon qualifying
- Full name: Sabine Katharina Lisicki
- Country (sports): Germany
- Residence: Bradenton, Florida, US
- Born: 22 September 1989 (age 37) Troisdorf, West Germany
- Height: 1.78 m (5 ft 10 in)
- Turned pro: 2006
- Plays: Right-handed (two-handed backhand)
- Coach: Richard Lisicki
- Prize money: US$7,202,429

Singles
- Career record: 363–272
- Career titles: 4
- Highest ranking: No. 12 (21 May 2012)

Grand Slam singles results
- Australian Open: 4R (2012)
- French Open: 3R (2013, 2015)
- Wimbledon: F (2013)
- US Open: 4R (2011, 2015)

Other tournaments
- Olympic Games: 3R (2012)

Doubles
- Career record: 84–60
- Career titles: 4
- Highest ranking: No. 35 (9 April 2012)

Grand Slam doubles results
- Australian Open: 2R (2016)
- French Open: 3R (2013)
- Wimbledon: F (2011)
- US Open: QF (2012)

Other doubles tournaments
- Olympic Games: 2R (2012)

Grand Slam mixed doubles results
- Australian Open: 1R (2013)
- Wimbledon: 3R (2017)

Other mixed doubles tournaments
- Olympic Games: SF – 4th place (2012)

Team competitions
- Fed Cup: F (2014), record 10–7
- Hopman Cup: RR (2009, 2010)
- Last updated on: 21 October 2024.

Sabine Katharina Lisicki (German pronunciation: [zaˈbiːnə lɪˈzɪki]; born 22 September 1989) is a German inactive professional tennis player.

Lisicki turned professional in 2006, and her breakthrough came in 2009 when she reached the quarterfinals of the Wimbledon Championships, and also won her first title on the WTA Tour, at the Family Circle Cup. In March 2010, she suffered an ankle injury at the Indian Wells Open that kept her out of competition for five months and saw her fall out of the top 200. Lisicki rebounded in 2011 and won the Birmingham Classic, before entering the Wimbledon Championships as a wildcard and going on to reach the semifinals, where she lost to Maria Sharapova. In doing so she became only the second woman in Wimbledon history to make it to the semifinals while entering the tournament as a wildcard. She followed that two months later by winning her third WTA tournament, the Texas Open. In 2012, she achieved her career-high ranking of world No. 12 and again reached the quarterfinals of Wimbledon. Again, in 2012 she suffered from another ankle injury that prevented her from having better results on tour. Lisicki reached the final of the 2013 Wimbledon Championships, losing to Marion Bartoli. The following year, she had another quarterfinal at Wimbledon and won her first title in three years when she won the Hong Kong Open.

In doubles, Lisicki won the Porsche Tennis Grand Prix in 2011 with Samantha Stosur and in 2013 with Mona Barthel and the 2014 Miami Open with coach Martina Hingis. She also reached the doubles final at Wimbledon in 2011 with Stosur and came fourth in the mixed-doubles event at the 2012 London Olympics with Christopher Kas.

Between 2014 and 2018, Lisicki held the world record for the fastest serve by a female tennis player. A 131.0 mph (210.8 km/h) serve was measured during her first-round encounter against Ana Ivanovic at the 2014 Stanford Classic. She also held the record for the most aces in a singles match, hitting 27 aces during her second-round encounter against Belinda Bencic at the 2015 Birmingham Classic, until it was surpassed by Kristýna Plíšková at the 2016 Australian Open.

== Early life ==
Lisicki's parents emigrated to West Germany from Poland in 1979; her father, Dr. Richard Lisicki, is of German and Polish descent and her mother, Elisabeth, of Polish. They came to Germany as "Aussiedler", descended from German citizens who lived in the former eastern territories of Germany which had become part of Poland after World War II. In a 2009 interview with the German newspaper Die Welt, her father put emphasis on Lisicki being German: "Sabine is a German – not only because of her birth here [in Germany]." Lisicki was born in Troisdorf, North Rhine-Westphalia, in 1989. Her father, who introduced her to the sport at the age of seven, has a doctorate in sport science and is her coach. Her mother is a painter specialising in ceramics.

== Career ==
=== Early years ===
Since 2004, Lisicki has trained at the Nick Bollettieri Tennis Academy in Bradenton, Florida, where she is sponsored and managed by IMG. She is coached by her father, who studied sport science in Wrocław and Cologne. Early in her career, Lisicki could not fly to tournaments because of a lack of funding. She had to be driven across Europe in a car by her parents so that she could attend tournaments. Lisicki said: "My parents did everything possible to let me play tennis. That's what I appreciated so much. My dad has worked from 8 in the morning til 9 in the evening to make it possible so I can play tennis. We had to cancel tournaments because we couldn't afford to go there."

In 2006, Lisicki competed at the Sunfeast Open in Kolkata, where she defeated Ragini Vimal in the first, but lost in the final qualifying round to Sanaa Bhambri. She competed in her first WTA Tour main-draw match when she was given a wildcard to play at the German Open. She lost in the first round to Mara Santangelo, in three sets.

Lisicki had a successful year in 2007 on the ITF Circuit and climbed from world No. 497 to No. 198 in the WTA rankings. She won two titles, one in Jersey and the other in Toronto. She defeated top-seed Katie O'Brien at the Vancouver Open.

=== 2008: Start of the journey ===
At the Australian Open, her first Grand Slam tournament, she defeated the 16th-seeded player, Dinara Safina, as well as Mariya Koryttseva to reach the third round as a qualifier. She lost her third round match to Caroline Wozniacki. In the first round of the Fed Cup against the United States, Lisicki defeated Lindsay Davenport in straight sets. Lisicki next reached the fourth round of the Miami Open, a Tier I event, where she defeated sixth seeded Anna Chakvetadze in straight sets, but was defeated in the next round by Elena Dementieva.

At Wimbledon, Lisicki lost in the first round to the 2007 runner-up, 11th seed Marion Bartoli. In October, Lisicki reached her first WTA tournament final at the Tashkent Open, where she lost in three sets to fellow teenager Sorana Cîrstea.

=== 2009: Breakthrough year ===
Lisicki started her year at the Hopman Cup in Perth where she advanced to the third round before losing to Dominika Cibulková in straight sets. At the Australian Open, Lisicki defeated the 30th seed Aleksandra Wozniak in the opening round before losing to Samantha Stosur in straight sets. She then took part in Germany's 3–2 win over Switzerland in their Fed Cup World Group II tie, defeating Timea Bacsinszky but losing to Patty Schnyder.

At the Cellular South Cup in Memphis, Lisicki reached the semifinals, defeating third seed Lucie Šafářová on the way before losing to eventual winner Victoria Azarenka. Lisicki then took part in the first Premier Mandatory tournament of the year in North America. At the Indian Wells Open, she lost in the first round to Elena Vesnina. At the Miami Open, she lost in the second round to 26th seed Iveta Benešová.

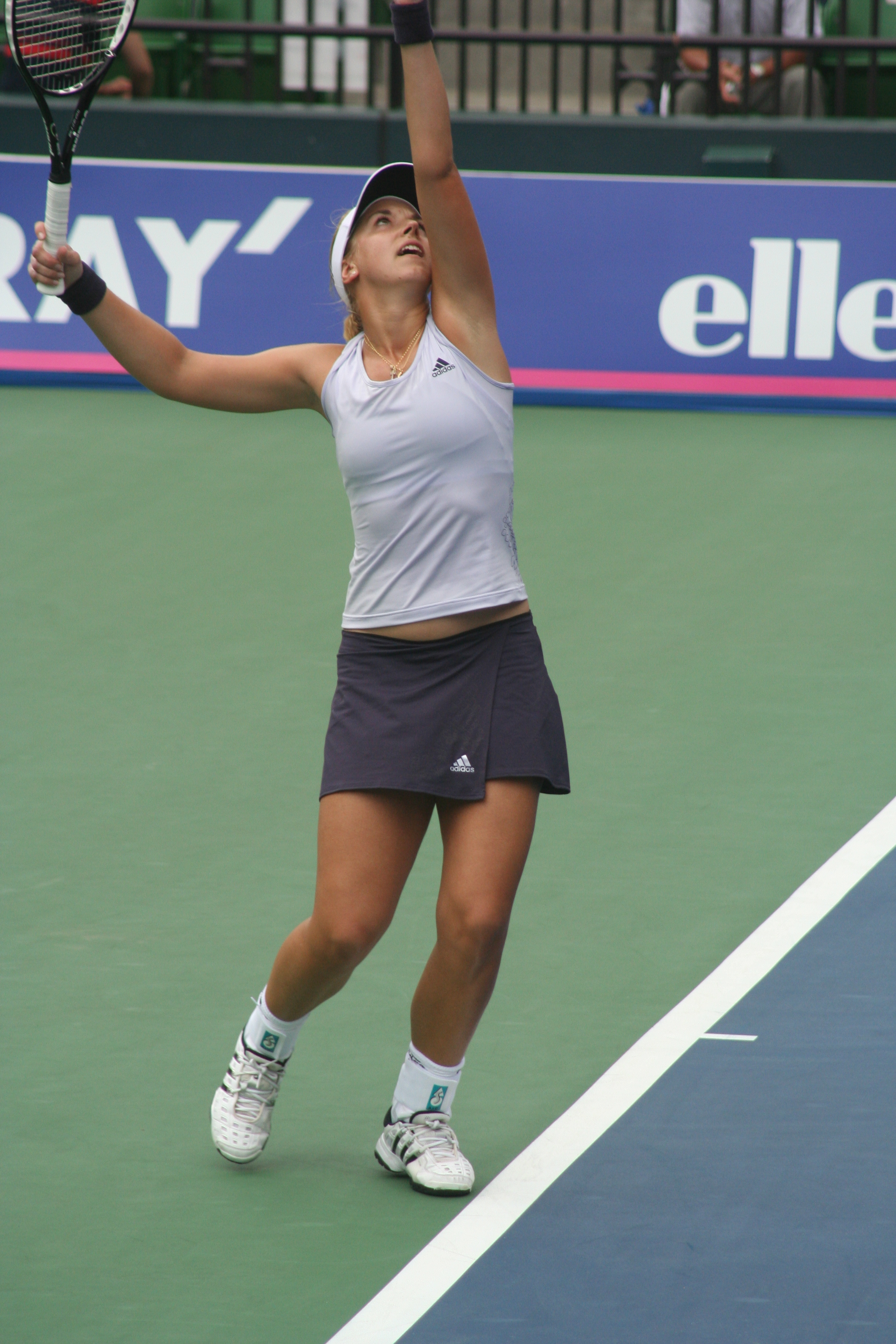
Lisicki at the 2009 Pan Pacific Open

During the clay-court season, Lisicki lost in the second round of the Amelia Island Championships in Ponte Vedra Beach to eventual finalist and fifth seed Aleksandra Wozniak. On the green clay at the Charleston Open in, Lisicki won her first WTA Tour title without dropping a set, defeating the fifth seed Caroline Wozniacki in the final. She had previously defeated second seeded Venus Williams in the third round and No. 6 seed Marion Bartoli in the semifinals. She then took part in Germany's Fed Cup World Group play-off win against China. She defeated world No. 16 Zheng Jie in the first singles match, and partnered with Anna-Lena Grönefeld to win the decisive doubles match.

Lisicki advanced to the second round of the Porsche Tennis Grand Prix in Stuttgart before losing to third-seeded Jelena Janković in straight sets. She then advanced to the quarterfinals at the Portugal Open where she lost to compatriot Anna-Lena Grönefeld, retiring when 2–6 down. At the French Open, Lisicki lost to Lucie Šafářová in the first round.

On her first match on grass at the Eastbourne International, Lisicki lost to Samantha Stosur in the first round. In doubles, Lisicki and her partner Ana Ivanovic lost in the first round to Cara Black and Liezel Huber.

Lisicki played her first Grand Slam quarterfinal at Wimbledon, where she was beaten by world No. 1, Dinara Safina. On her way to the quarterfinal, she had defeated Anna Chakvetadze in the first round, Patricia Mayr in the second, the 2009 French Open champion and fifth seed Svetlana Kuznetsova in the third round, and ninth seed Caroline Wozniacki in the fourth.

Seeded 23rd, Lisicki advanced to the second round at the 2009 US Open, but lost to qualifier Anastasia Rodionova. On 3 September 2009, daytime, Rodionova's match point, Lisicki slipped while going to return a backhand and injured her left ankle. She left the court in a wheelchair as Rodionova advanced to the third round. Lisicki later reported that an MRI showed no tears. The injury was a sprain, and Lisicki returned to her base in Florida for rehabilitation.

She returned to the tour at the Pan Pacific Open at the end of September, where she reached the second round before losing in three sets to seventh seed Jelena Janković. In October, she reached the final of the Luxembourg Open, but lost to Timea Bacsinszky. On her way to the final she beat Iveta Benešová, Polona Hercog, Patty Schnyder and Shahar Pe'er.

Lisicki qualified for the Tournament of Champions. She lost her first round-robin match to Aravane Rezaï, but won her second round-robin match against Melinda Czink.

=== 2010: Injuries and struggles ===
Lisicki started the season by playing at the Hopman Cup for Germany. She won her singles ties against Elena Dementieva and Laura Robson but lost to Yaroslava Shvedova. Partnering with Philipp Kohlschreiber, they lost all their doubles matches, so Germany did not proceed to the finals.

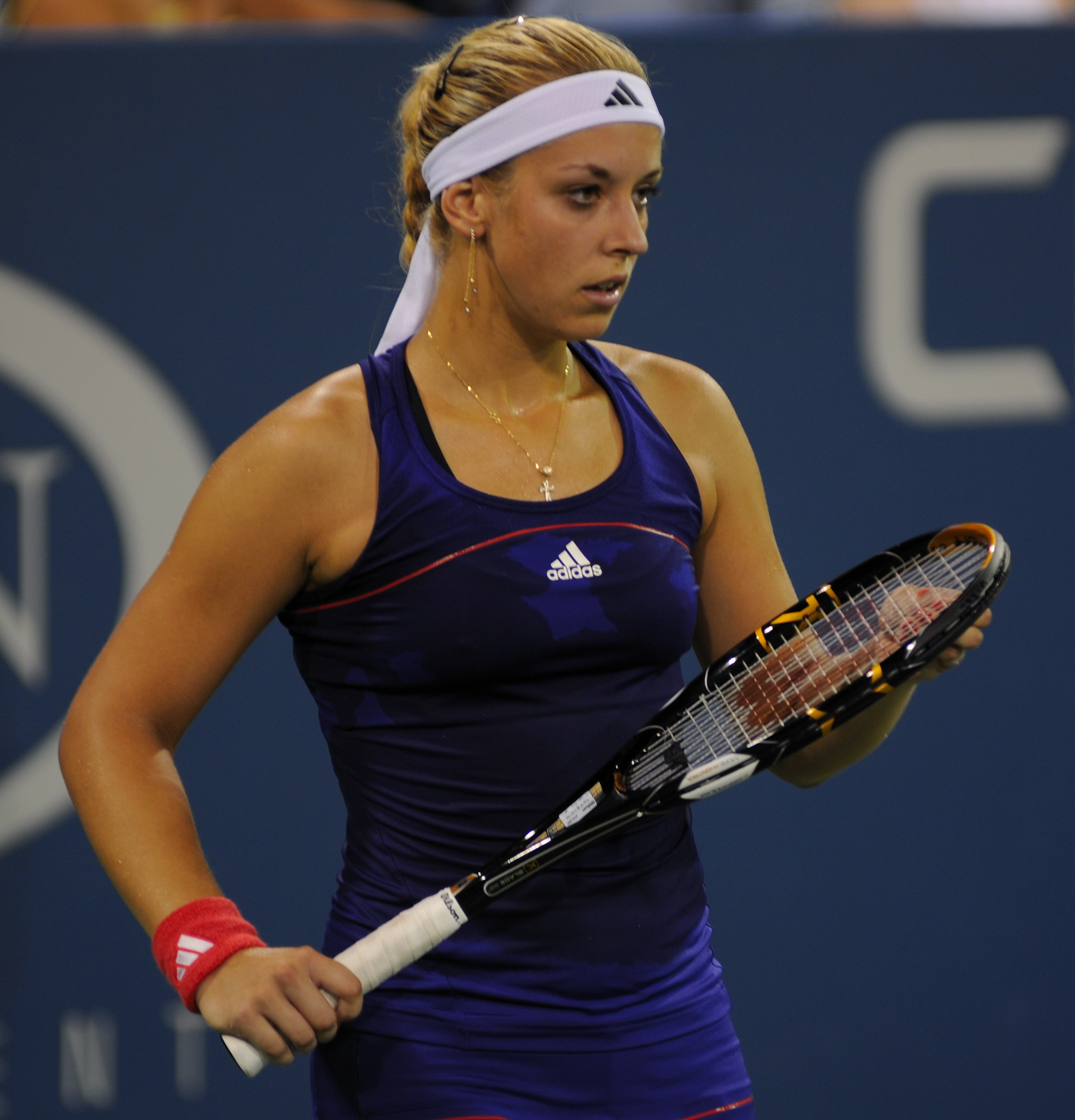
Lisicki at the 2010 US Open

As the 21st seed, Lisicki was defeated at the Australian Open in the second round by Alberta Brianti, in three sets. She then played the Pattaya Open in Bangkok where she was the second seed and lost her second-round match to home player Tamarine Tanasugarn. At Dubai, she lost her second-round match against Venus Williams. Her next two tournaments were at Indian Wells and Miami. In both tournaments, Lisicki retired in the second round because of an ankle injury. The injury sidelined her for five months, and she withdrew from tournaments at Ponte Vedra and Charleston. She also missed Roland Garros and Wimbledon. Lisicki had to learn how to walk again and faced suggestions that she should retire rather than risk further injury. She later said: "I always believed. Always. No matter what happened. I can still remember when the doctor told me that I have to be on crutches the next six weeks. That period made me such a much stronger person and player. I know anything is possible after learning how to walk again. I love the sport so much and I miss it when I cannot be out there on the court. It just gives me the belief to overcome anything."

Coming into the US Open ranked world No. 96, Lisicki advanced to the second round before losing to seventh seed and eventual finalist Vera Zvonareva. After the US Open, she failed to qualify for the Luxembourg Open causing her ranking to fall to No. 179 in the WTA rankings.

=== 2011: Return to form ===
Lisicki started the season at the Auckland Open where she lost to Yanina Wickmayer in three sets in the second round. At Melbourne, Lisicki played the qualifying tournament and lost in the second round to Vesna Manasieva. After losing at the Indian Wells Open to Sorana Cîrstea in the qualifying rounds in March, Lisicki fell down the rankings to No. 218. She lifted her form and reached the third round at the Miami Open, where she was defeated by Maria Sharapova.

At the Family Circle Cup, Lisicki reached the third round, but lost to Sania Mirza in two sets. At the Porsche Tennis Grand Prix, she lost in the quarterfinals against her compatriot Julia Görges, eventual champion of the tournament. In doubles, Lisicki partnered with former world No. 1 doubles player Samantha Stosur to win her first ever career doubles title. At the French Open, Lisicki advanced to the second round against the number three seed, Vera Zvonareva. Lisicki had a match point at 5–2 of the third set, but she lost the point and eventually the match. Afterwards, she lay on the court, sobbing, and was taken off on a stretcher due to injury.

At the Birmingham Classic, Lisicki reached the final where she defeated Daniela Hantuchová to win her second WTA Tour title. At Wimbledon, she received a wildcard to enter the tournament, advancing to the semifinals of a major for the first time, and beating third seed and recent French Open champion Li Na in the second round. She was eliminated by Maria Sharapova in straight sets after leading the first set 3–0. This was the first time in 12 years that a German woman (since Steffi Graf reached the Wimbledon finals in 1999) had reached the semifinal stage of a Grand Slam. Lisicki was the second wild-card entry to reach the women's semifinals in Wimbledon history. In doubles, Lisicki partnered with Stosur and lost in the final.

At the Silicon Valley Classic, Lisicki beat fourth seed and doubles partner Samantha Stosur and fifth seed Agnieszka Radwańska, but fell to Serena Williams in the semifinals. At the Cincinnati Open, Lisicki lost to Shahar Pe'er in the first round. She then traveled to Dallas to compete in the inaugural Texas Open as the fifth seed. After advancing to the semifinals with an easy win over qualifier Kateryna Bondarenko, she crushed eighth seed Irina-Camelia Begu to advance to the final. Lisicki won her third title, defeating qualifier Aravane Rezaï, having dropped no more than three games each match of the way to her victory. She moved to a new career-high rank of world No. 18, on 29 August. Seeded 22nd at the US Open, she easily advanced to the second round with a straight-sets win over Alona Bondarenko. She was scheduled to play Venus Williams in the second round, but Williams withdrew before it started due to her recent diagnosis of Sjögren's syndrome. Lisicki dispatched Irina Falconi to advance to the fourth round for the first time, before ultimately being defeated by second seed Vera Zvonareva. At the China Open Lisicki defeated Zheng Saisai in straight sets but withdrew from her second round match against Kaia Kanepi.

Lisicki was named the WTA Comeback Player of the Year in November.

=== 2012: Continued success and injuries ===
Lisicki's first tournament in 2012 was the Auckland Open where she was the No. 1 seed. In the first round, she defeated Virginie Razzano. In the second round, she defeated Mona Barthel. In the quarterfinal, she faced Angelique Kerber, the 2011 US Open semifinalist, and was losing 4–6, before retiring, due to a back injury, in the second set at a score of 3–4. In doubles, she entered with Chinese player Peng Shuai and they won their first round match against Sara Errani and Roberta Vinci. Both the Italians would go on to the Australian Open in four weeks time. In the second round, they pulled out due to the injury picked up by Lisicki in the quarterfinal of the singles tournament against Angelique Kerber.

Lisicki next entered the Sydney International where she was unseeded. Before the first round of the tournament began, she pulled out with her recent back injury and gave her place to lucky loser Alexandra Dulgheru.

Lisicki next competed in the Australian Open where she was the 14th seed. In the first round, she faced Stefanie Vögele and beat her in three sets. In the second round, she defeated Shahar Pe'er. In the third round, she beat 18th seed Svetlana Kuznetsova. She was defeated by Maria Sharapova. Lisicki took the first set, winning six consecutive games after being down 0–3, but was unable to match Sharapova in the following two sets.

At the 2012 Fed Cup, Lisicki played for Germany alongside Julia Görges, Anna-Lena Grönefeld and Angelique Kerber. She started off the meeting between Germany and the Czech Republic by facing Iveta Benešová, a match in which she lost. In her second match, she faced Wimbledon champion Petra Kvitová and also lost. Germany lost the meeting by a score of 1–4.

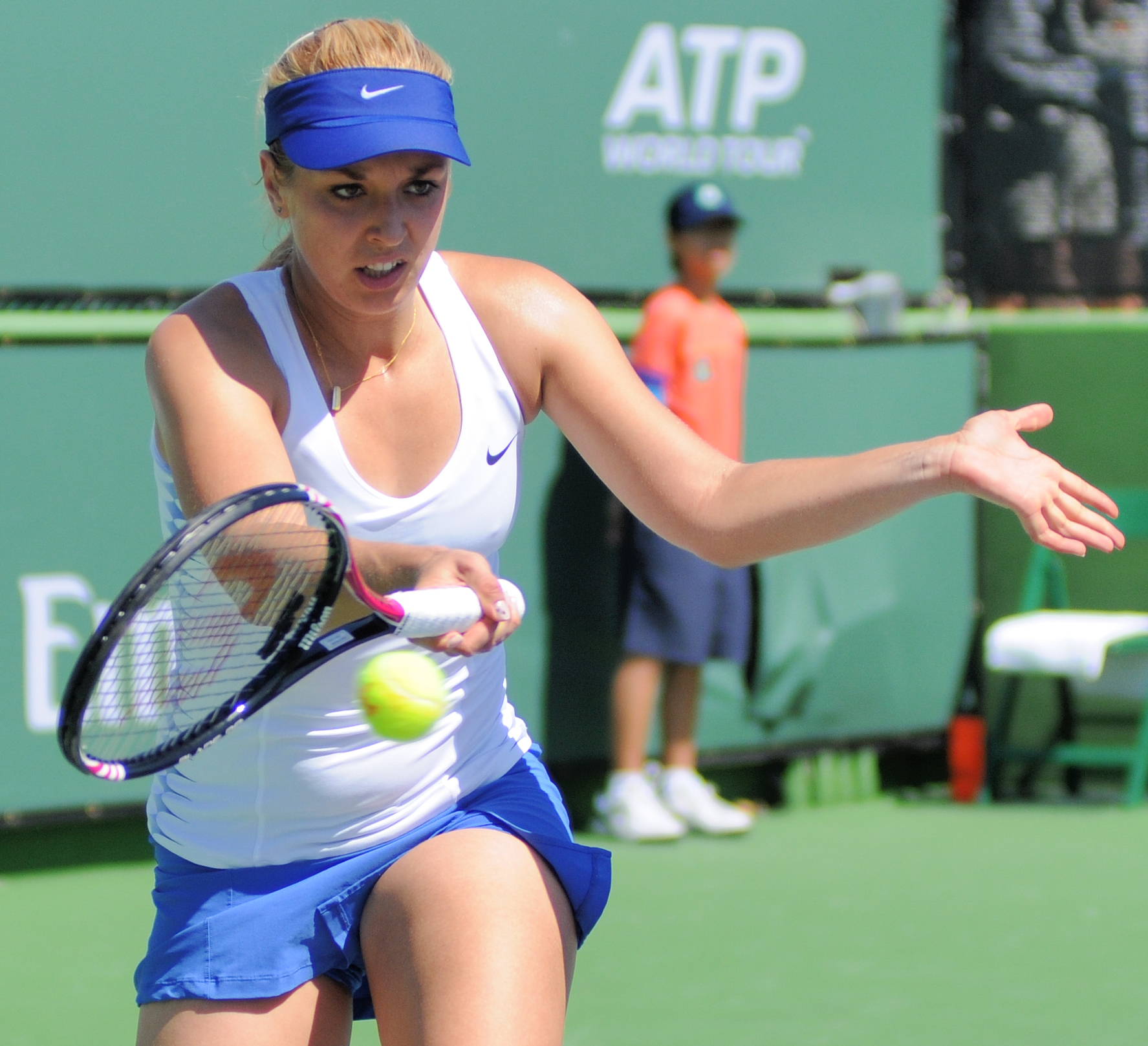
Lisicki at the 2012 Indian Wells Open

Lisicki's next tournament was supposed to be the Open GdF Suez where she was to be the fifth seed. She pulled out before the tournament began with a viral illness.

Lisicki then competed at the Qatar Ladies Open where she was the ninth seed. In the first round she met compatriot Angelique Kerber and lost in three sets to continue a losing streak dating back to the fourth round of the Australian Open. In doubles, she was the fourth seed along with Russian Maria Kirilenko. They received a bye into the second round where they met Andreja Klepač and Alicja Rosolska, beating them in a third set tie-break. In the third round they met fifth seeds Nuria Llagostera Vives and Anastasia Rodionova. They lost the first set 4–6, and in the second set, Llagostera Vives and Rodionova took an early 3–1 lead, but Lisicki and Kirilenko were able to even the score by winning the following two games. The two teams swapped a break of serve to bring the score to 4–4. The teams held serve and brought the set to a tiebreak. Lisicki and Kirilenko won 7–3 to level the score at one set each. They lost the third set, and with it, ultimately, the match.

Lisicki's next tournament was the Dubai Championships, where she was supposed to face fifth seed Agnieszka Radwańska in the first round. However, after second seed Petra Kvitová withdrew, she became the ninth seed and received Kvitová's bye into the second round. There she met Iveta Benešová, defeating her in two sets. In the quarterfinals, she was knocked out by Radwańska.

At Indian Wells as the 11th seed, she received a bye into the second round where she faced Lourdes Domínguez Lino, losing in two sets. In doubles with compatriot Julia Görges, she beat Raquel Kops-Jones and Abigail Spears. The two Germans next faced French Open champions Lucie Hradecká and Andrea Hlaváčková, losing in straight sets.

Lisicki next went to Miami, where she was the 12th seed. She got a bye to the second round where she faced Sofia Arvidsson. Victorious, she then faced Peng Shuai in the third round. She won this match too and then faced Li Na in the fourth round. Li defeated Lisicki in three sets.

At the Family Circle Cup, Lisicki was the sixth seed. She received a bye into the second round. There she faced lucky loser Andrea Hlaváčková, winning in three. She faced qualifier Yaroslava Shvedova in the third round and won in straight sets. In the quarterfinals, she faced Serena Williams. Behind 1–4 to her opponent, Lisicki fell and injured her left ankle. She retired from the match in tears, sending Serena into the semis. In doubles, she paired with Australian Open women's doubles champion Vera Zvonareva. They lost to top seeds Liezel Huber and Lisa Raymond.

As a result of the fall in her quarterfinal match, Lisicki was forced to the sideline at the Fed Cup World Group Play-off tie against Australia. She was also forced to pull out of the Porsche Tennis Grand Prix, from which she was defending a quarterfinal spot in singles and the doubles title which she won with Sam Stosur. Lisicki also missed the Madrid Open, a Premier Mandatory tournament.

After nearly a month off the tour, Lisicki returned as the 12th seed at the Italian Open. She faced Marina Erakovic in the first round, where she lost. Traveling next to her home country for the Internationaux de Strasbourg, where she was the top seed, Lisicki again experienced a first round upset, losing to Pauline Parmentier.

Lisicki then traveled to Paris to play the French Open, where she was the 12th seed. On the red clay of Roland Garros, Lisicki lost to Bethanie Mattek-Sands.

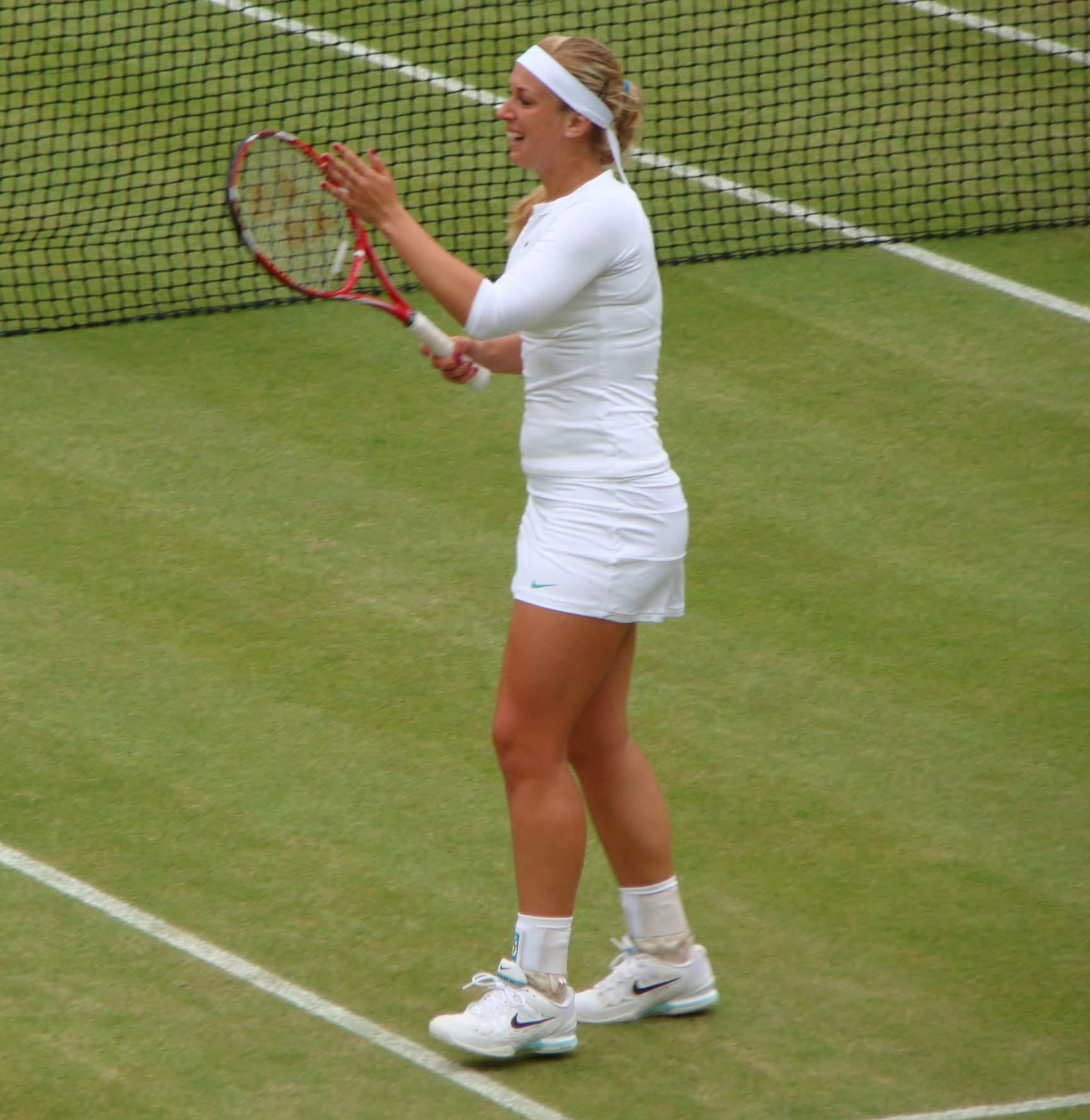
Lisicki knocked out former world No. 1 and 2012 French Open champion Maria Sharapova in the fourth round of the 2012 Wimbledon Championships.

Lisicki started her summer grass-court season by defending her title at Eastbourne. As the second seed, she received a bye into the second round, where she lost to Urszula Radwańska. This set Lisicki up with a five-match losing streak going into the Wimbledon Championships. In the first round, she beat unseeded Petra Martić, breaking her losing streak and putting her into the second round, where she faced qualifier Bojana Jovanovski. Lisicki won the match in three sets to set up a third round tie with Sloane Stephens, where she again faced a tight match, pulling through in the third set. In the fourth round, she beat top seed Sharapova, to whom she had lost in the semifinals the previous year. This marked the third year that Lisicki had beaten the reigning French Open champion in Wimbledon, having also beaten Li Na in 2011 and Svetlana Kuznetsova in 2009. In the subsequent quarterfinals, Lisicki once again met Angelique Kerber. Having lost the previous four meetings, Lisicki proceeded to lose the first set 3–6. Lisicki rallied in the second set to take it in a tiebreak; in this second set Lisicki saved two match points. Lisicki proved ultimately unable to take the match. At one point, she was serving for the match at 5–3, but Kerber went on the take the set and the match, dropping Lisicki back down to a world ranking of 18.

Lisicki entered the Southern California Open as the fifth seed but pulled out with an abdominal injury. She went straight back to London to prepare for the 2012 Summer Olympics. She entered singles where she was seeded 15, and in mixed doubles with Christopher Kas where they were unseeded. In the singles, she beat Ons Jabeur and Yaroslava Shvedova in the first and second round respectively. She lost to Maria Sharapova in the third round, after winning the first set and leading 4–2 in the second. In doubles, Lisicki and Kerber beat British pair Laura Robson and Heather Watson in the first round, after losing the first set whilst taking only eleven points and going 4–2 down in the second set. In the second round, they lost to Venus and Serena Williams. In mixed doubles, Lisicki and Kas beat second seeds Bob Bryan and Liezel Huber in the first round, and Daniele Bracciali and Roberta Vinci in the quarterfinals. In the semifinals, they lost to Andy Murray and Laura Robson. In the bronze medal match, they lost to third seeds Mike Bryan and Lisa Raymond.

Lisicki moved on to the Rogers Cup in Montreal. She was 15th seed in singles falling in her opening match to Carla Suárez Navarro. In doubles, she made it to the quarterfinals, partnering with Peng Shuai. They beat sixth seeds Iveta Benešová and Barbora Záhlavová-Strýcová, and Natalie Grandin and Vladimíra Uhlířová in the first and second rounds respectively. They were forced to pull out of the competition against top seeds Raymond and Huber as a result of Lisicki suffering an abdominal injury.

Lisicki entered the US Open as the 16th seed, but she was upset in the first round by Sorana Cîrstea. In doubles, Lisicki again partnered with Peng Shuai. They beat Laura Robson and Shahar Pe'er in the first round, 12th seeds Anastasia Rodionova and Galina Voskoboeva in the second and sixth seeds Elena Vesnina and Ekaterina Makarova in the third. They lost to eventual finalists Hlaváčková and Hradecká in the quarterfinals.

Lisicki's next tournament was in Japan at the Pan Pacific Open. In singles, she started with a first-round loss against qualifier Heather Watson. In doubles, she partnered with world No. 3, Lisa Raymond. They faced Monica Niculescu and Alicja Rosolska, both of whom had recently lost in WTA doubles finals. Lisicki and Raymond won the match and defeated Darija Jurak and Katalin Marosi in the quarterfinals.

Lisicki next participated at the China Open, but she was defeated in the second round by the eventual champion Victoria Azarenka. She next moved to Linz where she lost in the first round to Patricia Mayr-Achleitner. Lisicki finished her season losing in the first round of the Luxembourg Open to Kirsten Flipkens of Belgium.

=== 2013: First Grand Slam singles final ===
Lisicki started 2013 with the Brisbane International. She beat Lucie Šafářová in the first round. She lost in the second round to world No. 1, Victoria Azarenka. She pulled out of the qualifying draw at Sydney with a virus.

Lisicki then competed at the Australian Open. In the first round she faced Caroline Wozniacki and was defeated. She also competed in the mixed doubles with Frederik Nielsen. They were knocked out in the first round by the home favorites and eventual champions, Jarmila Gajdošová and Matthew Ebden.

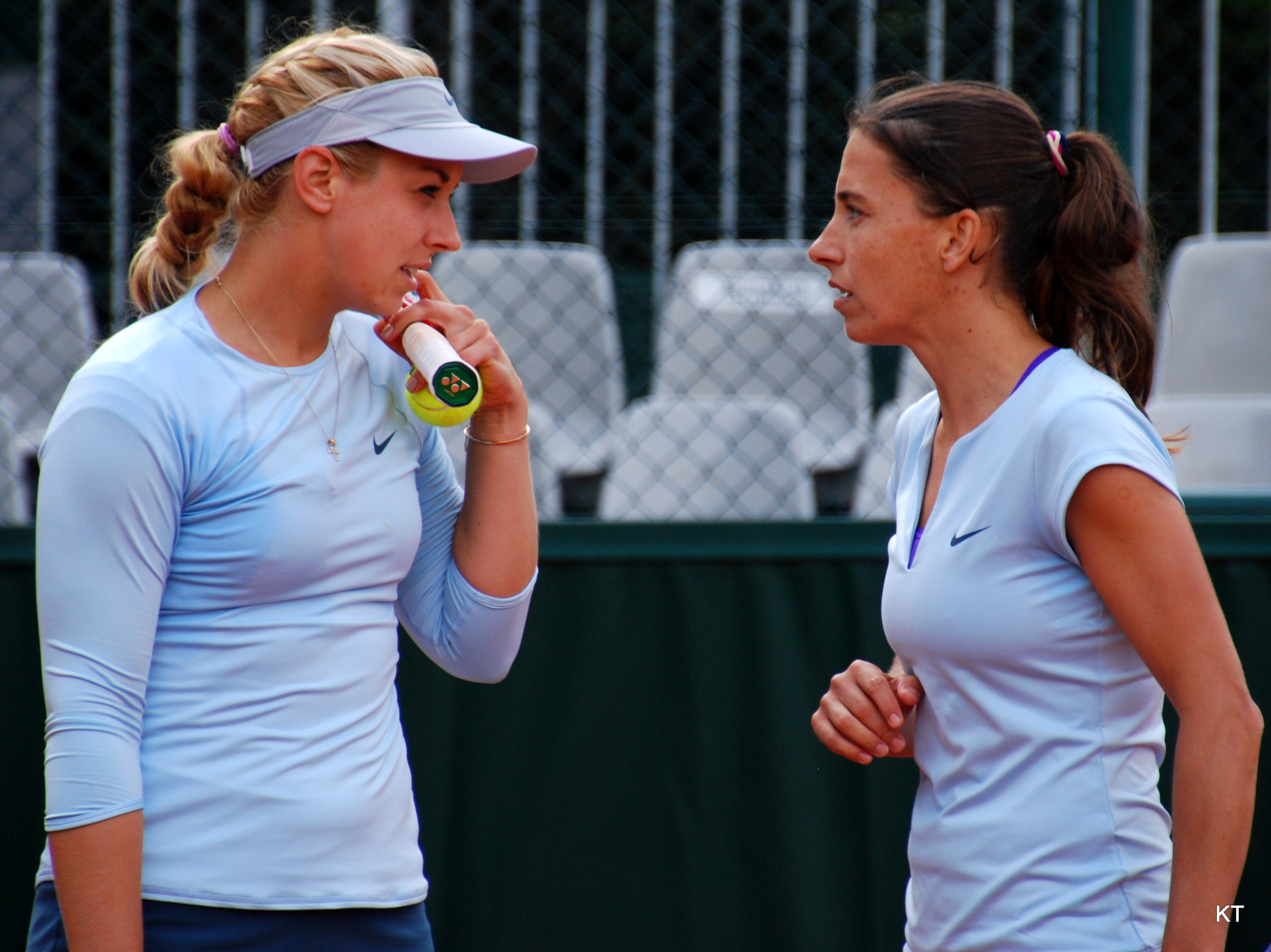
Lisicki and Janette Husárová during the 2013 French Open

Lisicki then moved onto the Pattaya Open. In the first round she beat fellow German Tatjana Malek. She downed Alexandra Panova in the second round and came back from a set down in the quarterfinals to beat Marina Erakovic. In her first semifinal since 2011, she beat Nina Bratchikova. In the final, she lost to Maria Kirilenko in three sets.

Her next tournament was in Memphis. As the third seed, she beat qualifier Madison Keys in the first round and Melinda Czink in the second. In the quarterfinal, she beat eighth seed Kristina Mladenovic and beat seventh seed Magdaléna Rybáriková in the semifinal. In Lisicki's second final of the year, she faced Marina Erakovic from New Zealand. Erakovic ran away with the first set and Lisicki retired from the final with illness.

Lisicki missed the Indian Wells Open with the same illness. She returned in time to play at the Miami Open but lost in the first round to Simona Halep.

Lisicki started her clay-court season on the green clay at the Charleston Open. Lisicki claimed the title here in 2009. In the first round, she recorded her first ever double bagel (not losing any games) in beating Anna Tatishvili. In the second round, she lost from a set up against Mallory Burdette.

Her next tournament was on the red clay in Katowice, Poland. As the seventh seed, she lost in the first round to Alexandra Cadanțu of Romania. She then travelled to Stuttgart for Germany's Fed Cup World Group Play-off tie against Serbia. Angelique Kerber and Mona Barthel were picked for singles against Ana Ivanovic and Bojana Jovanovski. After the four singles matches, the score was tied at two all. Lisicki was picked to play the doubles rubber with Anna-Lena Grönefeld against Vesna Dolonc and Aleksandra Krunić. The German pairing easily won to secure Germany its place in the 2014 Fed Cup World Group. Lisicki stayed in Stuttgart to compete at the Porsche Grand Prix. In singles, she beat qualifier Italian Nastassja Burnett. In the second round, she beat Jelena Janković. She lost in the quarterfinals to qualifier Mattek-Sands. In doubles, she and compatriot Mona Barthel received a wildcard to play in the main draw. They were scheduled to play world number ones Vinci and Errani but they pulled out before the tournament began. Instead, they were drawn against alternates Jill Craybas and Megan Moulton-Levy. Lisicki and Barthel easily won, with the loss of just two games. They then faced Jelena Janković and Mirjana Lučić-Baroni, a match in which they won in three sets. In the semifinals, they defeated Darija Jurak and Katalin Marosi, in straight sets. In the final, Lisicki got revenge for her singles loss by beating Mattek-Sands and her partner Sania Mirza. This was Lisicki's second WTA doubles title. She and Barthel became the first all-German pairing to lift the trophy in Stuttgart.

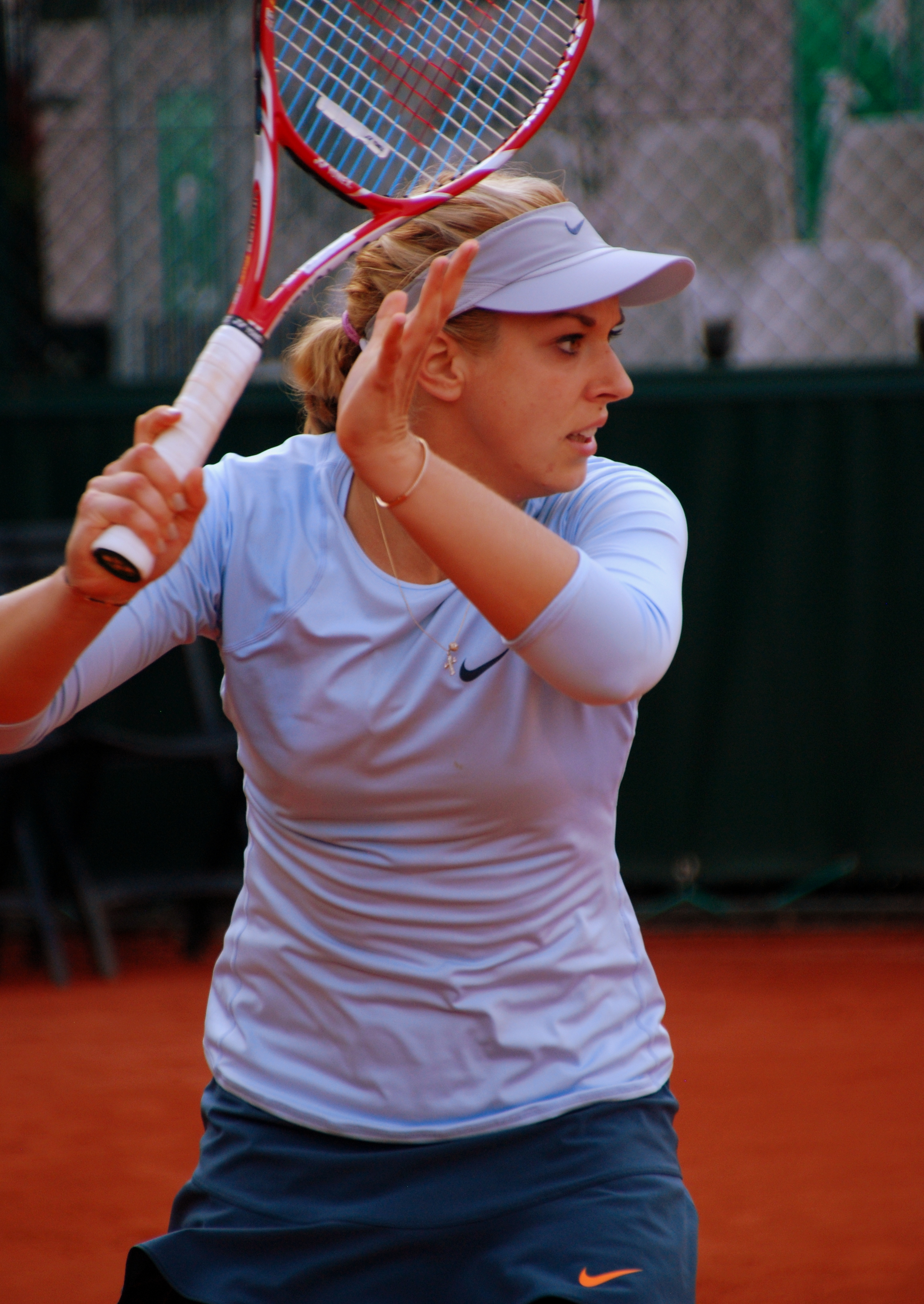
Lisicki at the 2013 French Open

Lisicki continued her clay season in Madrid. In the first round, she beat Sofia Arvidsson of Sweden. In the second round, she defeated 15th seed Dominika Cibulková. In the third round, she played world No. 2, Maria Sharapova. Sharapova ultimately won in straight sets, with Lisicki putting up a fight in the second set. From Madrid, Lisicki went to Rome to play at the Italian Open. In the first round, she defeated American qualifier Mallory Burdette, but lost to eighth seed Petra Kvitová in the second round.

Lisicki then went to Paris for the second major of the year. In singles, she was the 32nd seed. She defeated Sofia Arvidsson in the first round and pulled off a straight sets win against Spaniard María Teresa Torró Flor in the second round, reaching the third round of the French Open for the first time in her career. There she was defeated by fifth seed and defending finalist Sara Errani. In doubles, Lisicki partnered with Janette Husárová. They came from a set down to beat Bojana Jovanovski and Eva Hrdinová in the first round. In the second round, they upset fifteenth seeds Chan Hao-ching of Taipei and Darija Jurak of Croatia. They faced defending champions Errani and Vinci in the third round, losing in straight sets.

Lisicki started her grass court season by playing at the Birmingham Classic. As the fifth seed, she received a bye into the second round where she defeated Kristýna Plíšková. In the third round, she beat Mirjana Lučić-Baroni. She lost to Alison Riske in the quarterfinals. In the final set, Lisicki was 4–5 down and serving at 15–0 when Riske shouted "come on!" during a rally before Lisicki had returned the ball. Lisicki was unhappy and wanted the umpire to make a hindrance call, which would have given her the point and put her 30–0 up. The umpire did not agree with her and neither did the tournament referee. Riske took the point and broke Lisicki to win the match.

At the Wimbledon Championships, Lisicki, seeded 23rd, beat Francesca Schiavone in the first round, Elena Vesnina and 14th seed Samantha Stosur in the second and third round. In the fourth round, she faced first seed and reigning Wimbledon, US Open, and French Open champion Serena Williams. Lisicki won in three sets, marking the fourth time in her last four participations that she knocked out the reigning French Open champion at Wimbledon. Williams had been on a 34-match winning streak coming into the match. Lisicki defeated Kaia Kanepi of Estonia, reaching the Wimbledon semifinals for the second time in her career. She beat Agnieszka Radwańska in a three set semifinal in two hours and 18 minutes to advance to her first Grand Slam final, thereby becoming the first German woman to reach a major final since Steffi Graf at Wimbledon in 1999, and the first German player of either gender to reach a Grand Slam singles final since Rainer Schüttler at the 2003 Australian Open. However, she lost to Marion Bartoli, in straight sets.

Her next tournament was the Western & Southern Open, however she lost in her opening match in a tight three-setter against Jelena Janković. She then played at New Haven, beating Kristina Mladenovic in the first round before losing to Anastasia Pavlyuchenkova in the second.

She then played the US Open as the 16th seed, where she defeated qualifier Vera Dushevina in the first round. She then won her second match against Paula Ormaechea before losing to Ekaterina Makarova in round three.

Lisicki missed most of the Asian swing, but competed at the China Open as the 13th seed. She advanced to the third round beating Chanelle Scheepers and Venus Williams, before losing to home favourite Li Na. She then played the Osaka Open, again beating Scheepers in the first round, but was forced to withdraw from the tournament with a left hip injury before her second-round match.

Lisicki ended her 2013 season on a high by reaching the semi-finals of the Luxembourg Open. She beat Donna Vekić, Tereza Smitková and Karin Knapp in her opening three matches. She won the last set to love (6–0) in all three of these matches. In the semifinals, she succumbed to top seed and eventual champion Caroline Wozniacki in straight sets. She finished her year ranked as world No. 15.

=== 2014: Illness and injuries, fastest-serve record and 4th WTA title ===
It was confirmed in October 2013 that Lisicki would begin her 2014 season alongside Serena Williams and Victoria Azarenka at the Brisbane International. She advanced to the second round with a win over Magdaléna Rybáriková, but then withdrew from the tournament due to illness.

At the Australian Open, it was announced that Lisicki would bring in Martina Hingis as a coach. Seeded 15th, she began with a confident straight-sets victory over Mirjana Lučić-Baroni, but was upset in the second round by Monica Niculescu. At the Pattaya Open, Lisicki struggled to overcome Donna Vekić in the first round in three sets. After the match, she admitted that it had been almost impossible for her to serve effectively due to a right shoulder injury. She later withdrew from the tournament.

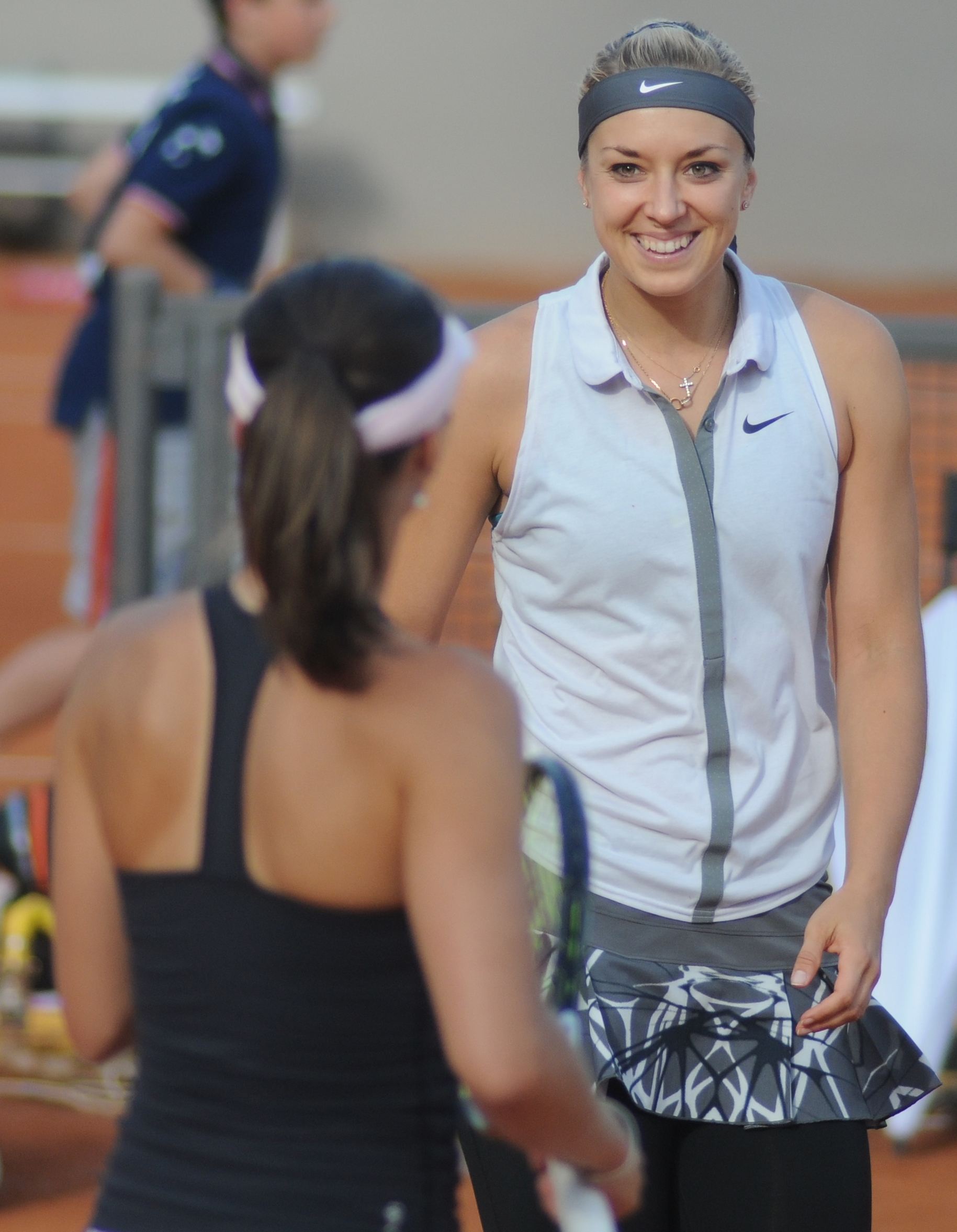
Lisicki and Martina Hingis at the 2014 Italian Open

Lisicki then endured a poor run across the North American swing, losing in her first match in Indian Wells to Aleksandra Wozniak. In Indian Wells, Lisicki also competed in the doubles draw playing alongside coach Martina Hingis. After getting a wildcard into the main draw, they played seventh seeds Ashleigh Barty and Casey Dellacqua. At the Miami Open, she beat Nadia Petrova in her opening match. However, she was forced to pull out before her third-round match against Kirsten Flipkens citing a bad flu. Despite pulling out of the singles draw, Lisicki was able to take a few days off to recover before she and Hingis started their campaign for the title. In the first round, they claimed their first win together by beating sixth seeds Andrea Hlaváčková and Lucie Šafářová. In the second round, Lisicki and Hingis convincingly defeated wildcards Sorana Cîrstea and Anastasia Pavlyuchenkova in straight sets. In their quarterfinal match, the pair pulled off an impressive comeback win beating Anabel Medina Garrigues and Yaroslava Shvedova despite losing the first set and facing match points against them in the second. In the semifinals, they played fifth seeds and Indian Wells finalists Cara Black and Sania Mirza and beat them in straight sets. In their first final in only their second tournament together, Lisicki and Hingis played second seeds Elena Vesnina and Ekaterina Makarova. Despite being the heavy favourites for the title, Vesnina and Makrarova would go on to lose the match in three sets. The win was Lisicki's third doubles title and her first off the indoor clay of Stuttgart and Hingis' 38th doubles title and first since 2007.

Lisicki looked to carry momentum from the Miami title by going to Charleston and playing at the Family Circle Cup. She entered the tournament as the fourth seed and received a bye in the first round of play. In the second round, she played Vania King and beat her in three sets. In the third round, she played compatriot Andrea Petkovic for the first time in her career. Lisicki lost to the eventual champion Petkovic, managing to score only one game in the whole match. Lisicki did not participate in Germany's Fed Cup semifinal victory over Australia, moving from the outdoor green clay of Charleston to the indoor red clay of Stuttgart. She lost in the opening round to ninth seed Ana Ivanovic.

Lisicki then competed at the Madrid Open where she was the 15th seed. She fell in the third round to Simona Halep in three sets. At Rome, she fell in her opening match to Samantha Stosur in straight sets. Lisicki reached the second round at Roland Garros where she retired against compatriot Mona Barthel after injuring her wrist.

In June, Lisicki split with coach Hingis, citing "different concepts" as the reason. As the 19th seed at Wimbledon, she could not repeat her feat from the previous year, only managing to reach the quarterfinals where she lost to Simona Halep. Along the way, she defeated Julia Glushko, Karolína Plíšková, Ivanovic and Shvedova, fighting through a shoulder injury against the Kazakh.

In July, Lisicki slipped down to 30 in the world rankings. In her first-round match at the Stanford Classic against Ivanovic, Lisicki set a world record serve for a female tennis player, clocked at 210.8 km/h (131.0 mph). However, Lisicki lost the match in straight sets. At the Rogers Cup in Montreal the following week, Lisicki defeated former world No. 5, Sara Errani, in the first round in straight sets. After coming from a set down to defeat Madison Keys in the next round, she lost to Agnieszka Radwańska in three sets. The following week in Cincinnati was almost a repeat. In the second round, Lisicki defeated Errani once more in a match that lasted three hours before being beaten by Radwańska, only managing to win two games. Lisicki, the 26th seed, reached the third round at the US Open where she lost to Maria Sharapova. In September, Lisicki participated in Hong Kong as the top seed after receiving a wildcard. She defeated Monica Niculescu and Grace Min to reach the quarterfinals. Then, she defeated Zheng Saisai and Francesca Schiavone to reach her first final of 2014. She won her fourth WTA title by defeating Karolína Plíšková, her first singles title in more than three years. Lisicki received a wildcard at the Pan Pacific Open but lost to Casey Dellacqua in the first round. At the Wuhan Open, she upset Lucie Šafářová in the first round before falling to Elina Svitolina in the second, despite leading 5–0 in the first set. At the China Open, she reached the third round for the second straight year by defeating Xu Shilin and Eugenie Bouchard. She then lost to Ivanovic in straight sets. Lisicki then played in Linz as the fifth seed. She accepted a wild card into the event. She lost to Karin Knapp in three sets in the first round. The following week, Lisicki was upset by Denisa Allertová in the second round at the Luxembourg Open having overcome Daniela Hantuchová in her opening match. Lisicki's last match of 2014 was at the Fed Cup where Germany faced Czech Republic. She was selected to play the doubles tie alongside Anna-Lena Grönefeld. They defeated the pair of Hlaváčková and Hradecká. Lisicki ended the year at No. 27.

=== 2015: First Premier Mandatory semifinal and most aces record ===
Lisicki had a rough start to the year, losing in the first rounds at the Brisbane International (champion in doubles with Hingis), the Sydney International and the Australian Open, losing to Shvedova, Suárez Navarro, and Mladenovic respectively. She finally picked up her first win of the year in Dubai beating Monica Niculescu before bowing out to Ana Ivanovic. Lisicki would then suffer more first round losses in Doha to Barbora Záhlavová-Strýcová and in Kuala Lumpur to eventual finalist Alexandra Dulgheru.

Lisicki rediscovered her form during the North American swing. At Indian Wells, she beat Roberta Vinci to record her first ever win at the tournament. She continued winning by beating Sara Errani and Caroline Garcia to advance to the quarterfinals. In the quarterfinals, she beat the defending champion Flavia Pennetta in a three set thriller, saving three match points to advance to the semifinals for the first time at a Premier Mandatory event. She lost to Jelena Janković in the semifinals in three sets despite leading by a set and a break. Lisicki carried her good form over to Miami where she beat fellow countrywoman Julia Görges, Ana Ivanovic, and Sara Errani to advance to her second Premier Mandatory quarterfinal in a row. She lost to eventual champion Serena Williams in the quarterfinals in three sets.

Lisicki then played for Germany in the semifinals against Russia at the Fed Cup where she lost to Anastasia Pavlyuchenkova in three sets despite having a match point in the second set. She also played in the doubles with Andrea Petkovic but the pair lost to Pavlyuchenkova and Elena Vesnina to give Russia the win and a place in the final.

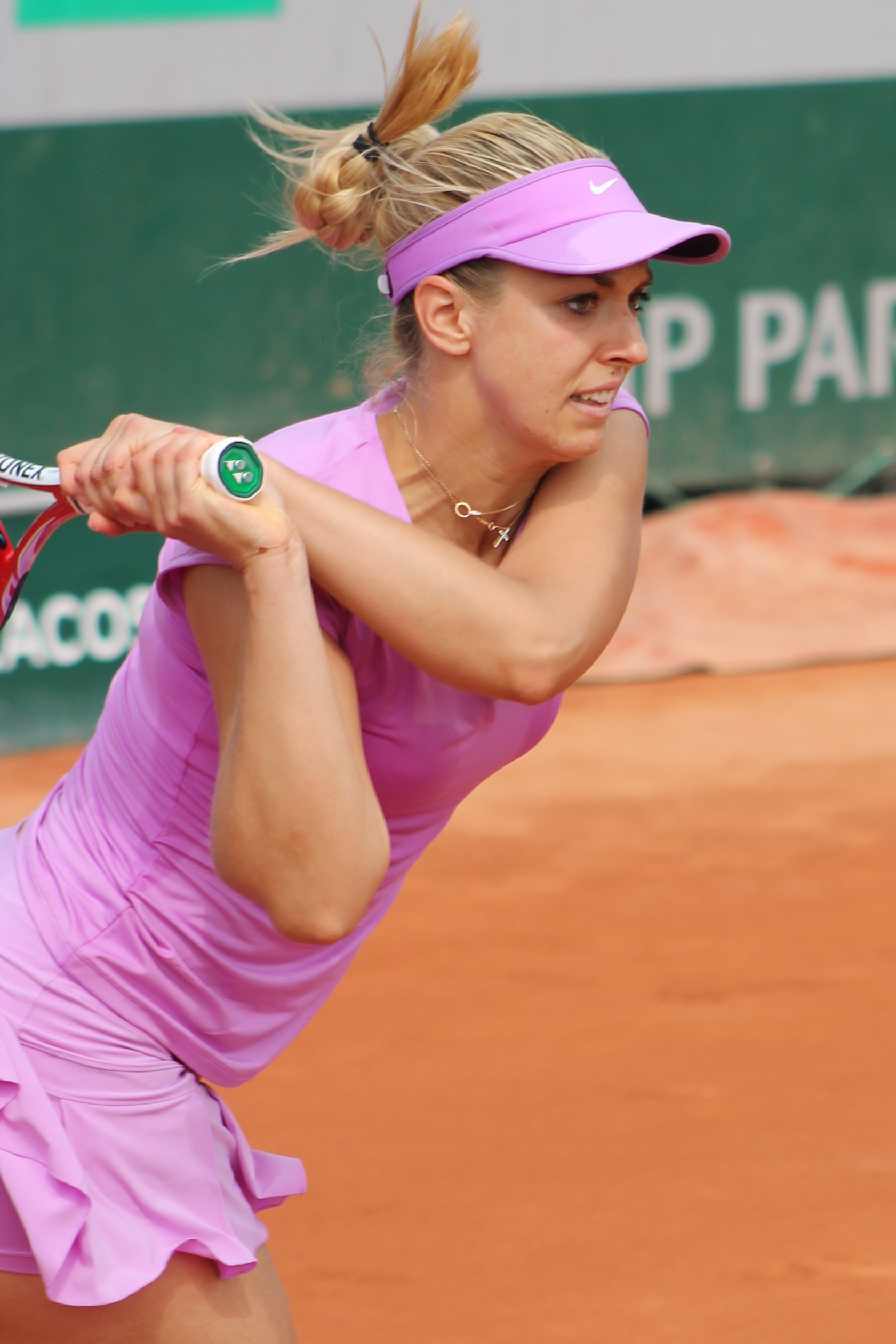
Lisicki at the 2015 French Open

Lisicki began on clay in Stuttgart and was handed her first career double bagel loss to Zarina Diyas in the first round. This followed with another first round exit at the Madrid Open to CoCo Vandeweghe. Lisicki then played at the Internazionali BNL d'Italia and picked up her first clay win by beating Sloane Stephens before losing to Timea Bacsinszky in straight sets. She then played at the Nuremberg Cup and lost in the second round to Lara Arruabarrena in three sets despite having a match point in the third set. Lisicki then played at the French Open as the 20th seed. She beat Monica Puig in the first round in straight sets. In the second round, after winning the first set, her opponent Daria Gavrilova retired, allowing Lisicki to advance to the third round, where she was defeated by eventual finalist, Lucie Šafářová in straight sets.

Lisicki started her grass-court season at Birmingham. In her second-round win over Belinda Bencic, Lisicki broke the record for the most aces in a singles match, hitting a total of 27 aces. She then beat 2009 champion Magdaléna Rybáriková and 2013 champion Daniela Hantuchová to advance to the semifinals. She lost to fellow countrywoman and eventual champion Angelique Kerber, in straight sets. Lisicki then played at Wimbledon as the 18th seed. She beat Jarmila Gajdošová and Christina McHale to advance to the third round. She lost to Timea Bacsinszky in straight sets ending a streak of making the quarterfinals or better which she had done in her five previous appearances.

Lisicki began her summer hardcourt season at Stanford where she lost to Kimiko Date-Krumm in the first round in three sets after being up a set and 4–1. Lisicki then played at the Rogers Cup, beating last year's finalist, Venus Williams and Barbora Strýcová to advance to the third round where she lost to eventual champion, Belinda Bencic in three sets despite having a match point in the third set. She then played at the Western & Southern Open and lost in the first round to Caroline Garcia in three sets. Lisicki then played at the US Open as the 24th seed. She beat qualifier Aliaksandra Sasnovich and Camila Giorgi in the first two rounds. In the third round she beat Barbora Strýcová in three tight sets, coming from 1–5 down in the third set to advance to the fourth round for the first time at the tournament since 2011. It was the final singles match ever played on the Grandstand court. She lost to Simona Halep in three sets, in a match that had a combined 105 unforced errors and 17 breaks of serve.

After the completion of the US Open, Lisicki reported that she would not compete for the rest of the season due to a knee injury. Lisicki ended the year at No. 32.

=== 2016: Struggles, in and out of top 100 ===
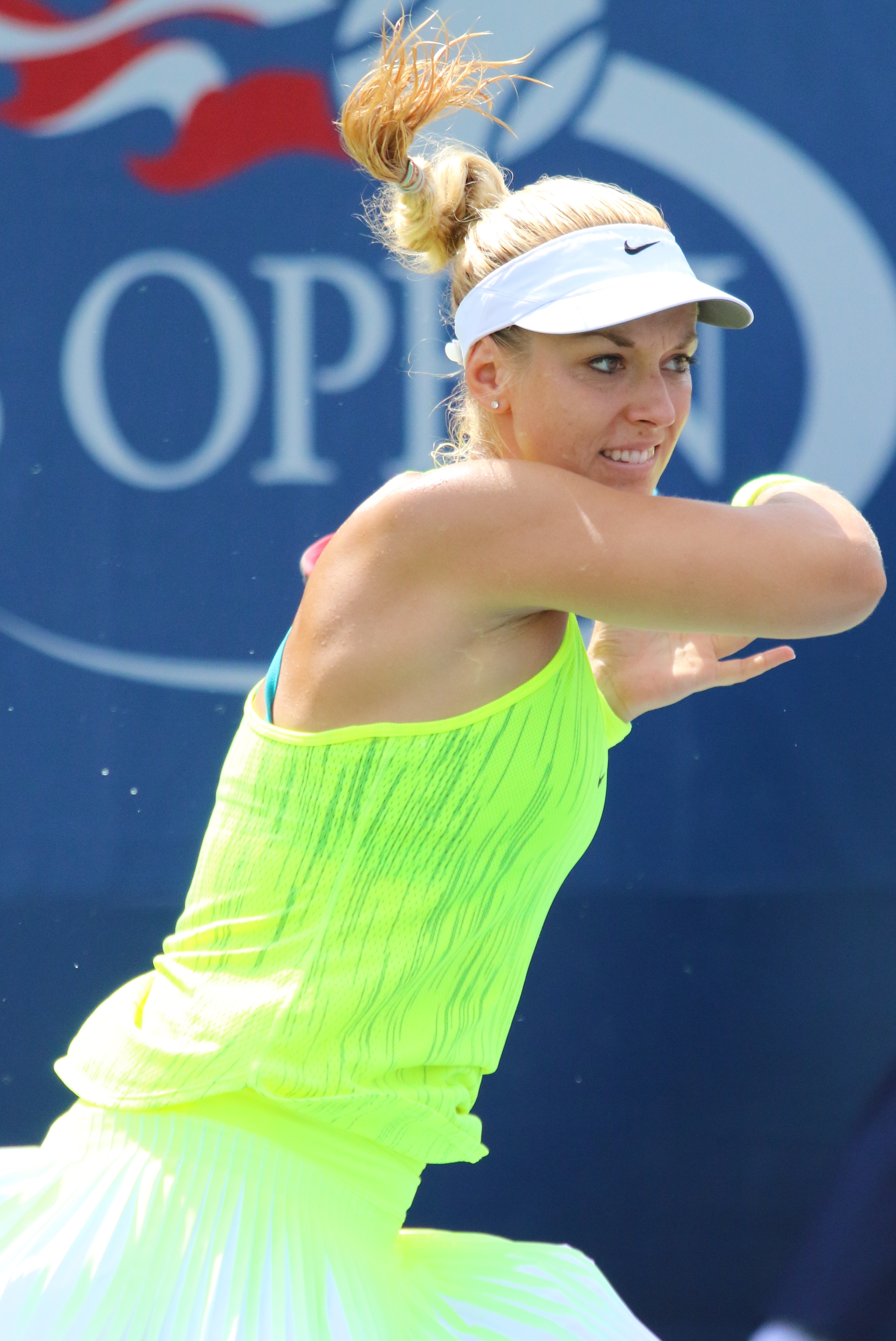
Lisicki at the 2016 US Open

Lisicki began her 2016 season at the Hopman Cup representing Germany with Alexander Zverev. They were eliminated in the group stage with a 1–2 record, with their only victory coming against France. Her next tournament was the Sydney International where she lost in the second round to eventual champion, Svetlana Kuznetsova. Seeded 30th at the Australian Open, she was defeated in the second round by Denisa Allertová.

In Doha, Lisicki lost in the first round to Monica Niculescu. Seeded third at the Malaysian Open, she reached the quarterfinals where she was defeated by Naomi Broady. Seeded 29th at Indian Wells, she lost in the second round to Johanna Larsson. Seeded 29th in Miami, she was defeated in the second round by Irina-Camelia Begu, despite having a 5–0 lead and one match point in the third set.

Seeded 15th at the Charleston Open, which was formerly called the Family Circle Cup, Lisicki lost in the second round to Yulia Putintseva. At the Porsche Grand Prix, she was defeated in the first round by Tímea Babos. Competing in Madrid, she lost in the second round to eighth seed Carla Suárez Navarro. At the Italian Open, she was ousted in the first round by Daria Gavrilova. At the Nuremberg Cup, Lisicki avenged her loss to Lara Arruabarrena the previous year before losing to Varvara Lepchenko in straight sets. At the French Open, Lisicki lost to qualifier Verónica Cepede Royg in the first round in straight sets.

Lisicki started her grass season at the Mallorca Open. She beat Kristina Mladenovic before losing to Mariana Duque in three sets. Lisicki then played at Wimbledon. She easily beat recent French Open quarterfinalist Shelby Rogers in straight sets and in the second round she beat 14th seed Sam Stosur in straight sets. She then fell to Yaroslava Shvedova in the third round.

Lisicki started her hardcourt season at Washington, D.C., where she defeated Kristína Kučová before losing to Kristina Mladenovic, also in straight sets. At the Canadian Open qualifying, after receiving a walkover in the first round, she fell to Magda Linette. This loss saw her fall out of the top 100. She couldn't qualify for the 2016 Summer Olympics. She played at the Cincinnati Open qualifying stage and knocked out Anastasija Sevastova in round one, but was defeated by Zheng Saisai in round two. At the US Open, Lisicki lost to Yulia Putintseva in the first round, but in doubles, she and Alla Kudryavtseva defeated Varatchaya Wongteanchai/Yang Zhaoxuan and second seed Chan Hao-ching/Chan Yung-jan in the first two rounds, but then fell to 13th seed Andreja Klepač/Katarina Srebotnik.

At the Japan Open, Lisicki lost to Johanna Larsson. Then at the Guangzhou Open, she safely reached the quarterfinals by beating Kwan Yau Ng and Peng Shuai, but finally lost to Jelena Janković. At the Wuhan Open, Lisicki was defeated by Ekaterina Makarova and at the China Open, Lisicki beat Lučić-Baroni but lost to Svitolina. She received a wildcard in both the Wuhan Open and China Open and after this, Lisicki was back in the top 100 again.

At the Luxembourg Open, she beat Viktorija Golubic but lost to second seed Caroline Wozniacki. Lisicki next played at the Hawaii Open and beat Julia Boserup and Verónica Cepede Royg, but retired injured in the third set of her quarterfinal against Jacqueline Cako. Lisicki ended the year at No. 93.

=== 2017: Restart ===
Lisicki was supposed to participate at the Kooyong Classic; however, she withdrew due to a shoulder injury, which also kept her out of the Australian Open.

Lisicki returned to the courts in June at the Mallorca Open. She reached the quarterfinals beating fifth seed Kiki Bertens and Shelby Rogers. She ended up losing to eventual finalist Julia Görges. At Wimbledon, she was defeated in the first round by 27th seed Ana Konjuh.

Lisicki made it to the quarterfinals at the Washington Open eliminating qualifier Valentini Grammatikopoulou and Aryna Sabalenka. She ended up losing to fifth seed Océane Dodin. At the US Open, she was defeated in the first round by 27th seed Zhang Shuai.

In October, Lisicki competed at the Luxembourg Open. She lost in the second round to lucky loser Naomi Broady. Her final tournament of the year was at the Open de Limoges. She reached the semifinal where she retired during the second set against Antonia Lottner.

Lisicki ended the year ranked 268.

=== 2018: Injury struggles ===
Skipping the Australian Open, Lisicki played at the Taiwan Open, which was her first tournament after a break caused by a knee injury. She reached her first semifinal since 2015, losing to Kateryna Kozlova. In Doha, she was defeated in the first round of qualifying by Markéta Vondroušová. At the Hungarian Open, she lost her second-round match to lucky loser Viktória Kužmová. She was defeated in the first round of qualifying at Indian Wells and Miami by Sofia Kenin and Andrea Petkovic.

=== 2019: Continued struggles, rankings drop ===
In her first Australian Open appearance since 2016, Lisicki lost in the first qualifying round to Isabelle Wallace. That was her third straight first-round qualifying loss at a major event. She next lost in the first round of Hua Hin to Garbiñe Muguruza. She lost in the first qualifying round to Zarina Diyas at Dubai, and lost in the first round of Charleston to Sofia Kenin. She lost in the first round of Bogotá to the eventual champion Amanda Anisimova, and lost in the first qualifying round at Stuttgart to Isabella Shinikova. She then lost in the first qualifying round of Rabat to Bibiane Schoofs, and lost in the first round of Nuremberg to Ajla Tomljanović.

She failed to qualify for the ITF tournament in Surbiton, and also failed to qualify for the tournament in Rosmalen, losing in the first qualifying round to Greet Minnen. She next lost in the second qualifying round of Mallorca to Kaja Juvan, despite defeating compatriot Mona Barthel in the first qualifying round. She received a wildcard for the Wimbledon qualifying, where she lost in the final round to Lesley Pattinama Kerkhove, after defeating Tímea Babos and Ankita Raina. Despite failing to qualify for the main draw, this was her best showing since her first-round finish at the 2017 US Open. Her final event of the year was the WTA 125 Karlsruhe Open, where she was defeated in the first round by Jasmine Paolini. She ended the year ranked No. 335.

=== 2020: Severe injury ===
Her first event of the year was the WTA 125 Prague Open, where she reached the fourth round, defeating Samantha Murray Sharan, Stephanie Wagner, and Chihiro Muramatsu, before losing to Francesca Jones. Lisicki participated in her first WTA event of the year at Linz, where she defeated Bibiane Schoofs in the first qualifying round before falling to Tereza Martincová. In doubles, at the same event with Jodie Burrage, she retired from her first-round match against Ulrikke Eikeri and Yana Sizikova, whilst the pair led 6–5 in the first set. Lisicki fell on court, and tore her anterior cruciate ligament, and announced later that she had received surgery for the injury. She ended the year ranked No. 622.

=== 2022: Comeback and first WTA Tour win since 2018 ===
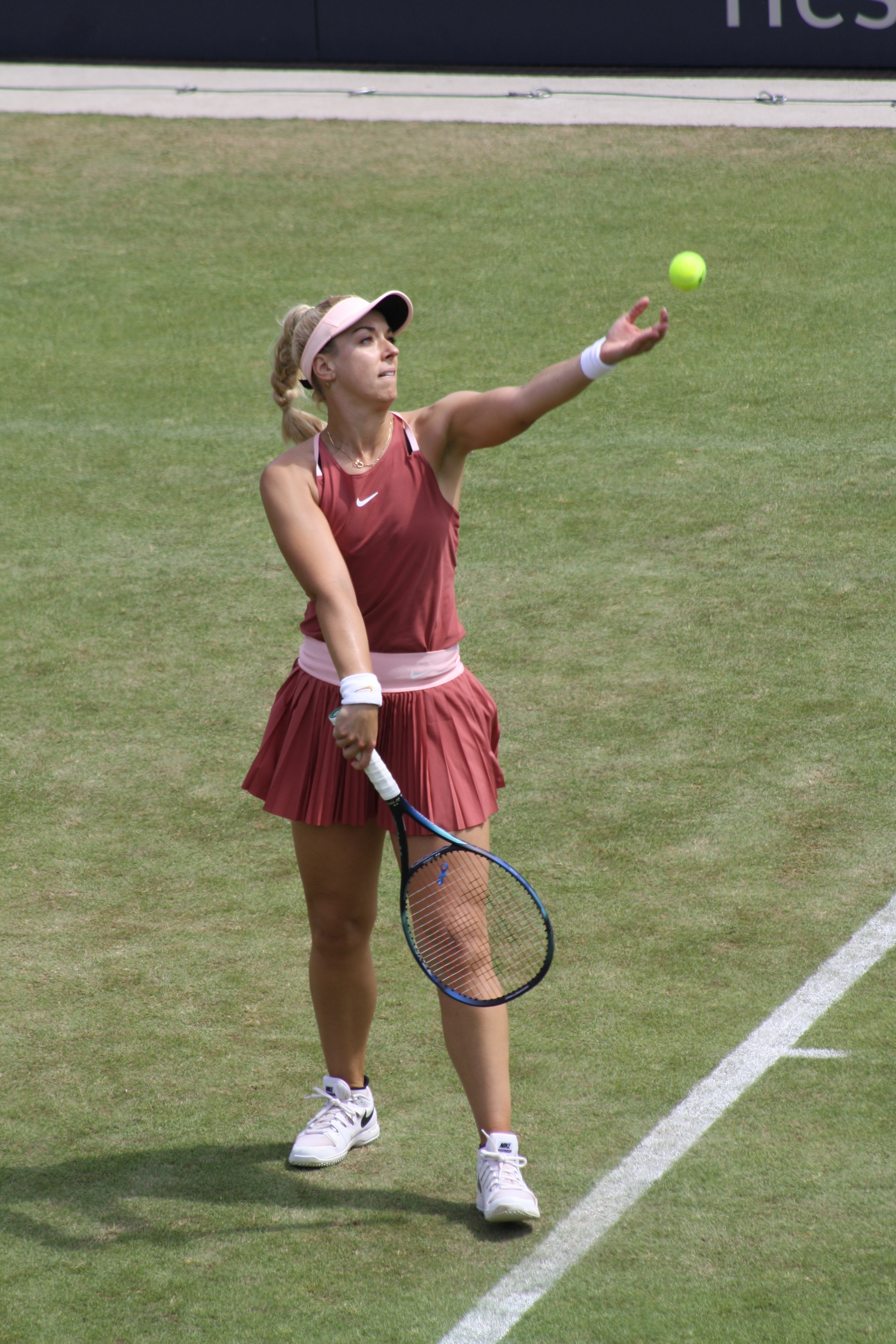
Lisicki at the 2022 Bad Homburg Open

In May, 18 months after surgery, Lisicki made her return to professional tennis in the qualifying draw of the FineMark Pro Championship, a $100k event played on clay courts. She won her first match against Ena Shibahara, a top ten ranked doubles player. In the final round of qualifying, she lost to Gabriela Lee, who went on to win the tournament. Lisicki then played a $25k clay tournament in Sarasota. She beat Anastasia Nefedova in the first round, and then beat fourth seed Sofia Shapatava in the second. In the quarterfinal, she played seventh seed Ashlyn Krueger but withdrew from the match when trailing by a set.

Lisicki began her grass-court season at the Surbiton Trophy. To qualify, she beat Naiktha Bains and Marcela Zacarías both in straight sets. In the main draw, she lost to Kateryna Baindl. She then received wildcards to compete in the German Open in Berlin. In the singles draw, she beat Asia Muhammad in the first round of qualifying, before losing to Daria Saville in the final round. In the doubles draw, she partnered Bianca Andreescu as a wildcard pair. They beat Yang Zhaoxuan and Xu Yifan in the first round and the third seeds Muhammad and Shibahara in the quarterfinals. In the semifinals, they lost to the top seeds, Storm Sanders and Kateřina Siniaková.

Lisicki won her first main draw match on the WTA Tour since 2018 as a wildcard at the Bad Homburg Open, defeating her compatriot Tamara Korpatsch. She then beat Belgian Greet Minnen in the second round, before losing to the eventual champion Caroline Garcia in the quarterfinals. With this result, she re-entered the top 500 in the WTA world rankings.

Lisicki's next tournament was the Hamburg Open, where she received a wildcard to play in the qualifying tournament. In the qualifying draw, she defeated 12th seed Stefanie Vögele and first seed Kateryna Baindl. In the first round of the main draw, she lost to Aleksandra Krunić.

Lisicki did not play again until November, when she was awarded a wildcard into the main draw of the Calgary Challenger. In the first two rounds, she beat qualifiers Carmen Corley and Martyna Ostrzygalo in straight sets, respectively. In the quarterfinals, she lost to eventual champion Robin Montgomery in two tiebreak sets. She then accepted a wildcard into the Andorra Open, where she defeated sixth seed Sara Errani and Alina Charaeva, but lost to Alycia Parks in the quarter-finals.

=== 2023: First title since 2014 ===
Lisicki won her first title in nine years at the Calgary Challenger, a W60 tournament.

== Playing style ==
"Lisicki is a big, strong, hard-hitting player who reminds me of a boxer throwing punches from every single direction. The problem is some of the punches land in the right spot and some don't. But she's got great power, a strong serve, she works very hard and has a big-match mentality you can't always teach."

— Nick Bollettieri

A baseliner, Lisicki hits "heavy balls" with topspin and pace. She has a strong forehand and backhand, hitting balls with power, depth and angles. She is nicknamed "Boom Boom" for her "huge serve and thumping groundstrokes". Germany Fed Cup team Captain Barbara Rittner has compared her to Steffi Graf, saying that she can "impose her game" and "plays with the same force" as Graf.

=== Serve ===
Lisicki's serve is among the most powerful on the WTA Tour, having been described variously as a "cannon" and a "howitzer". She is known to hit serves at speeds of over 120 mph, and at the 2014 Bank of the West Classic she broke the WTA fastest serve record with a speed of 131 mph, a record previously held by Venus Williams at 129 mph.

Her serve is often regarded as her main weapon and with it, for the year up to November 2013, she was ranked fifth in the WTA for first service points won, 70.7%, and fifth for service games won, 73.7%. She was ranked second in the aces count in 2013, only behind Serena Williams, and was ranked fifth in 2014. Lisicki also held the record for the most aces in a singles match. She broke the record of 24, held jointly by Serena Williams and Kaia Kanepi, by hitting 27 aces during her second-round encounter against Belinda Bencic at the 2015 Aegon Classic on 17 June 2015.

Lisicki, however, can be hindered by her weak and inconsistent second serve, which is usually only around 70 to 80 mph, and an occasionally high double-fault counts.

=== Surfaces ===
Lisicki's favourite surface is grass. She used to "hate" playing on grass but after beginning medication for her allergy "loves" playing on it.

== Personal life ==
Lisicki lives in Bradenton, Florida. She is fluent in German, English and Polish. She is a fan of the Germany national football team and of Bundesliga club Bayern Munich.

Lisicki was previously in a relationship with German comedian Oliver Pocher, whom she dated for almost three years. The couple split in 2016.

On 8 March 2024, Lisicki announced on Instagram that she and her fiancé were expecting a baby. On 8 September 2024, she announced that she had given birth to a daughter.

== Career statistics ==
=== Grand Slam performance timelines ===
Key
W	F	SF	QF	#R	RR	Q#	DNQ	A	NH

(W) winner; (F) finalist; (SF) semifinalist; (QF) quarterfinalist; (#R) rounds 4, 3, 2, 1; (RR) round-robin stage; (Q#) qualification round; (DNQ) did not qualify; (A) absent; (NH) not held; (SR) strike rate (events won / competed); (W–L) win–loss record.
To avoid confusion and double counting, these charts are updated at the conclusion of a tournament or when the player's participation has ended.

==== Singles ====
Tournament	2008	2009	2010	2011	2012	2013	2014	2015	2016	2017	2018	2019	2020	2021	2022	2023	SR	W–L	Win %
Australian Open	3R	2R	2R	Q2	4R	1R	2R	1R	2R	A	A	Q1	A	A	A	A	0 / 8	9–8	53%
French Open	2R	1R	A	2R	1R	3R	2R	3R	1R	A	A	A	A	A	A	A	0 / 8	7–8	47%
Wimbledon	1R	QF	A	SF	QF	F	QF	3R	3R	1R	Q1	Q3	NH	A	A	A	0 / 9	27–9	75%
US Open	2R	2R	2R	4R	1R	3R	3R	4R	1R	1R	Q1	A	A	A	A	A	0 / 10	12–10	55%
Win–loss	4–4	6–4	2–2	8–3	7–4	10–4	8–4	7–4	3–4	0–2	0–0	0–0	0–0	0–0	0–0	0–0	0 / 35	55–35	61%

=== Grand Slam tournament finals ===
==== Singles: 1 (runner-up) ====
Result	Year	Championship	Surface	Opponent	Score
Loss	2013	Wimbledon	Grass	(France) Marion Bartoli	1–6, 4–6

==== Doubles: 1 (runner-up) ====
Result	Year	Championship	Surface	Partner	Opponents	Score
Loss	2011	Wimbledon	Grass	(Australia) Samantha Stosur	(Czech Republic) Květa Peschke (Slovenia) Katarina Srebotnik	3–6, 1–6

Awards
Preceded by (Belgium) Justine Henin	WTA Comeback Player of the Year; 2011	Succeeded by (Kazakhstan) Yaroslava Shvedova
Records
Preceded by (United States) Venus Williams	Fastest serve world record holder 29 July 2014 – 19 February 2018	Succeeded by (Spain) Georgina García Pérez
