= 2022 WTA German Open – Doubles =

Doubles
- 2022 WTA German Open

Final
- Champions: (Australia) Storm Sanders (Czech Republic) Kateřina Siniaková
- Runners-up: (France) Alizé Cornet (Switzerland) Jil Teichmann
- Score: 6–4, 6–3

Events
Singles	Doubles
← 2021 ·	WTA German Open	· 2023 →

Storm Sanders and Kateřina Siniaková defeated Alizé Cornet and Jil Teichmann in the final, 6–4, 6–3 to win doubles tennis title at the 2022 WTA German Open.

Victoria Azarenka and Aryna Sabalenka were the defending champions, but Azarenka did not return to compete. Sabalenka partnered with Veronika Kudermetova but they withdrew before their first round match.

== Seeds ==
1. (Australia) Storm Sanders / (Czech Republic) Kateřina Siniaková (champions)
2. (Canada) Gabriela Dabrowski / (Mexico) Giuliana Olmos (semifinals)
3. (United States) Asia Muhammad / (Japan) Ena Shibahara (quarterfinals)
4. (Chile) Alexa Guarachi / (Slovenia) Andreja Klepač (quarterfinals)

== Draw ==
=== Key ===
- Q = Qualifier
- WC = Wild card
- LL = Lucky loser
- Alt = Alternate
- SE = Special exempt
- PR = Protected ranking
- ITF = ITF entry
- JE = Junior exempt
- w/o = Walkover
- r = Retired
- d = Defaulted
- SR = Special ranking

=== Draw ===
First round
1	(Australia) S Sanders (Czech Republic) K Siniaková	6	6
Alt	(China) X Han; A Panova	2	3
A Kalinskaya (United States) D Krawczyk	1	4
(United States) N Melichar-Martinez (Australia) E Perez	6	6
3	(United States) A Muhammad (Japan) E Shibahara	6	3	[10]
WC	(Germany) J Niemeier (Germany) A Petkovic	3	6	[8]
(China) Y Xu (China) Z Yang	5	4
WC	(Canada) B Andreescu (Germany) S Lisicki	7	6
(France) A Cornet (Switzerland) J Teichmann	6	6
(Japan) E Hozumi (Japan) M Ninomiya	3	3
(Norway) U Eikeri (Slovakia) V Kužmová	2	3
4	(Chile) A Guarachi (Slovenia) A Klepač	6	6
(United States) K Christian; L Marozava	6	3	[13]
(Tunisia) O Jabeur (Spain) G Muguruza	4	6	[11]
(Poland) A Rosolska (New Zealand) E Routliffe	6	5	[5]
2	(Canada) G Dabrowski (Mexico) G Olmos	4	7	[10]

Quarterfinals
1	(Australia) S Sanders (Czech Republic) K Siniaková	3	7^{7}	[12]
(United States) N Melichar-Martinez (Australia) E Perez	6	6^{5}	[10]
3	(United States) A Muhammad (Japan) E Shibahara	6^{4}	6	[7]
WC	(Canada) B Andreescu (Germany) S Lisicki	7^{7}	1	[10]
(France) A Cornet (Switzerland) J Teichmann	7	7^{7}
4	(Chile) A Guarachi (Slovenia) A Klepač	5	6^{3}
(United States) K Christian; L Marozava	4	2
2	(Canada) G Dabrowski (Mexico) G Olmos	6	6

Semifinals
1	(Australia) S Sanders (Czech Republic) K Siniaková	6	6
WC	(Canada) B Andreescu (Germany) S Lisicki	1	3
(France) A Cornet (Switzerland) J Teichmann	6	7
2	(Canada) G Dabrowski (Mexico) G Olmos	3	5

Final
1	(Australia) S Sanders (Czech Republic) K Siniaková	6	6
(France) A Cornet (Switzerland) J Teichmann	4	3
