= 2021 WTA German Open – Singles =

Singles
- 2021 WTA German Open

Final
- Champion: (Russia) Liudmila Samsonova
- Runner-up: (Switzerland) Belinda Bencic
- Score: 1–6, 6–1, 6–3

Details
- Draw: 28 (6 Q / 2 WC )
- Seeds: 8

Events
Singles	Doubles
← 2008 ·	WTA German Open	· 2022 →

Liudmila Samsonova defeated Belinda Bencic in the final, 1–6, 6–1, 6–3, to win the singles tennis title at the 2021 WTA German Open. Samsonova was contesting her first career final on the WTA Tour and had entered the main draw as a qualifier. Her win made her the 10th maiden titlist on the 2021 WTA Tour and the second qualifier of the season to claim a title.

Dinara Safina was the defending champion from when the event was last held in 2008 on clay courts, but she retired from professional tennis in 2014. As the inaugural edition of the tournament following its relaunch, this marked the first year the tournament was played on grass.

== Seeds ==
1. (Belarus) Aryna Sabalenka (second round)
2. (Ukraine) Elina Svitolina (second round)
3. (Canada) Bianca Andreescu (second round)
4. (Czech Republic) Karolína Plíšková (second round)
5. (Switzerland) Belinda Bencic (final)
6. (Spain) Garbiñe Muguruza (quarterfinals)
7. (Belarus) Victoria Azarenka (semifinals)
8. (Czech Republic) Karolína Muchová (first round)

== Draw ==
=== Key ===
- Q = Qualifier
- WC = Wild card
- LL = Lucky loser
- Alt = Alternate
- SE = Special exempt
- PR = Protected ranking
- ITF = ITF entry
- JE = Junior exempt
- w/o = Walkover
- r = Retired
- d = Defaulted
- SR = Special ranking

=== Finals ===
Semifinals
Q	(Russia) Liudmila Samsonova	6	6
7	(Belarus) Victoria Azarenka	4	2
(France) Alizé Cornet	5	4
5	(Switzerland) Belinda Bencic	7	6

Final
Q	(Russia) Liudmila Samsonova	1	6	6
5	(Switzerland) Belinda Bencic	6	1	3

=== Top half ===
First round
Q	(Poland) M Fręch	3	4
(United States) M Keys	6	6
(Czech Republic) M Vondroušová	4	6^{6}
Q	(Russia) L Samsonova	6	7^{8}
(Russia) V Kudermetova	7^{7}	5	6
8	(Czech Republic) K Muchová	6^{5}	7	2
(United States) J Pegula	6
Q	(United States) H Baptiste	6^{r}
(Germany) A Kerber	6	6
Q	(Japan) M Doi	2	1
WC	(Germany) A Petkovic	4	6^{2}
7	(Belarus) V Azarenka	6	7^{7}

Second round
1	(Belarus) A Sabalenka	4	6	5
(United States) M Keys	6	1	7
Q	(Russia) L Samsonova	6	6
(Russia) V Kudermetova	4	3
4	(Czech Republic) Ka Plíšková	5	2
(United States) J Pegula	7	6
(Germany) A Kerber	3	5
7	(Belarus) V Azarenka	6	7

Quarterfinals
(United States) M Keys	6^{4}	6	6^{0}
Q	(Russia) L Samsonova	7^{7}	2	7^{7}
(United States) J Pegula	2	7	4
7	(Belarus) V Azarenka	6	5	6

Semifinals
Q	(Russia) L Samsonova	6	6
7	(Belarus) V Azarenka	4	2

=== Bottom half ===
First round
6	(Spain) G Muguruza	6	6
(Romania) S Cîrstea	3	2
(Kazakhstan) E Rybakina	2	6	6
(United States) S Rogers	6	3	4
(United States) A Anisimova	3	1
(France) A Cornet	6	6
5	(Switzerland) B Bencic	4	6	7
Q	(Germany) J Niemeier	6	4	5
(Croatia) P Martić	7^{7}	4	6
Q	(United States) A Muhammad	6^{0}	6	3
(Russia) E Alexandrova	6	6
WC	(Russia) A Kalinskaya	3	2

Second round
6	(Spain) G Muguruza	6	6
(Kazakhstan) E Rybakina	4	3
(France) A Cornet	7^{7}	7
3	(Canada) B Andreescu	6^{2}	5
5	(Switzerland) B Bencic	6	6
(Croatia) P Martić	3	4
(Russia) E Alexandrova	6	7
2	(Ukraine) E Svitolina	4	5

Quarterfinals
6	(Spain) G Muguruza	6	3	6^{5}
(France) A Cornet	4	6	7^{7}
5	(Switzerland) B Bencic	6	4	7^{7}
(Russia) E Alexandrova	4	6	6^{4}

Semifinals
(France) A Cornet	5	4
5	(Switzerland) B Bencic	7	6

== Qualifying ==
=== Seeds ===
1. (United States) Ann Li (first round)
2. (Russia) Anna Blinkova (first round)
3. (Japan) Misaki Doi (qualified)
4. (Slovenia) Kaja Juvan (first round)
5. (Belarus) Aliaksandra Sasnovich (first round)
6. (Russia) Liudmila Samsonova (qualified)
7. (Germany) Anna-Lena Friedsam (qualifying competition)
8. (United States) Claire Liu (qualifying competition)
9. (Switzerland) Stefanie Vögele (qualifying competition)
10. (Croatia) Ana Konjuh (qualifying competition)
11. (Germany) Tamara Korpatsch (first round)
12. (Romania) Jaqueline Cristian (first round)

=== Qualifiers ===
1. (Germany) Jule Niemeier
2. (Poland) Magdalena Fręch
3. (Japan) Misaki Doi
4. (United States) Asia Muhammad
5. (United States) Hailey Baptiste
6. (Russia) Liudmila Samsonova

=== Qualifying draw ===
==== First qualifier ====
First round
1	(United States) Ann Li	3	6^{2}
WC	(Germany) Jule Niemeier	6	7^{7}
(Russia) Varvara Flink	2	3
8	(United States) Claire Liu	6	6

Qualifying competition
WC	(Germany) Jule Niemeier	7^{7}	6
8	(United States) Claire Liu	6^{3}	1

==== Second qualifier ====
First round
2	(Russia) Anna Blinkova	5	2
PR	(Luxembourg) Mandy Minella	7	6
(Poland) Magdalena Fręch	3	6	6
11	(Germany) Tamara Korpatsch	6	1	0

Qualifying competition
PR	(Luxembourg) Mandy Minella	2	3
(Poland) Magdalena Fręch	6	6

==== Third qualifier ====
First round
3	(Japan) Misaki Doi	7^{7}	7
(Germany) Mona Barthel	6^{2}	5
(United States) Varvara Lepchenko	3	4^{r}
7	(Germany) Anna-Lena Friedsam	6	3

Qualifying competition
3	(Japan) Misaki Doi	6	6^{4}	7^{7}
7	(Germany) Anna-Lena Friedsam	3	7^{7}	6^{3}

==== Fourth qualifier ====
First round
4	(Slovenia) Kaja Juvan	3	7	5
(United States) Asia Muhammad	6	5	7
WC	(Germany) Julia Middendorf	1	2
9	(Switzerland) Stefanie Vögele	6	6

Qualifying competition
(United States) Asia Muhammad	7	5	6
9	(Switzerland) Stefanie Vögele	5	7	3

==== Fifth qualifier ====
First round
5	(Belarus) Aliaksandra Sasnovich	3	6^{4}
(Australia) Priscilla Hon	6	7^{7}
(United States) Hailey Baptiste	6	6
12	(Romania) Jaqueline Cristian	3	1

Qualifying competition
(Australia) Priscilla Hon	3	5
(United States) Hailey Baptiste	6	7

==== Sixth qualifier ====
First round
6	(Russia) Liudmila Samsonova	6	6
WC	(Germany) Noma Noha Akugue	3	1
WC	(Germany) Nicole Rivkin	4	0
10	(Croatia) Ana Konjuh	6	6

Qualifying competition
6	(Russia) Liudmila Samsonova	4	6	7^{7}
10	(Croatia) Ana Konjuh	6	1	6^{4}
