= German Open (WTA) =

WTA Tour
- Founded: 1896–2008; 2021–present
- Editions: 103
- Location: Hamburg (1896–1978); West Berlin (1979–1990); Berlin (1991–2008, 2021–)
- Venue: Am Rothenbaum; Rot-Weiss Tennis Club (1979–2008, 2021–)
- Category: Tier I (1988–2008); WTA 500 (2021–)
- Surface: Clay outdoor (until 2008); Grass outdoor (2021–)
- Draw: 28S / 24Q / 16D
- Prize money: €1,206,446 (2026)
- Website: Website

Current champions (2026)
- Singles: (Czech Republic) Linda Nosková
- Doubles: Ekaterina Alexandrova (Czech Republic) Linda Nosková

The Berlin Tennis Open or the German Open (previously the ecotrans Ladies Open, bett1open) is an annual WTA Tour professional tennis tournament, held in Berlin, Germany, and is a WTA 500 event (since 2021). It was played in West Berlin, West Germany (from 1979 until 1990), following reunification in Berlin from 1991 to 2008 on clay, and since 2021 on grass.

Held since 1896, it is one of the oldest tournaments for women. Until 1978 the tournament was held in Hamburg together with the men's tournament. From 1988 until 2008, it was classified on the WTA Tour as a Tier I tournament. Since 2021, it is classed as a WTA 500 tournament.

After an absence of more than a decade, the tournament was announced to return to the WTA calendar for the 2020 season as the Grass Court Championships Berlin. However, the event was cancelled in April 2020 due to the COVID-19 pandemic and it returned in 2021 as the bett1open. The new event is classified as a 500-level tournament and serves as a warm-up event towards the Wimbledon Championships, having switched its surface from clay to grass.

Since 2021, there is a WTA tour tournament in Hamburg, the Hamburg Open, but it is played on outdoor clay courts and has nothing to do with the former tournament that is now held in Berlin.

== History ==
Past champions of the tournament include former world number ones Billie Jean King, Chris Evert, Steffi Graf, Monica Seles, Arantxa Sánchez Vicario, Martina Hingis, Amélie Mauresmo, Justine Henin, Ana Ivanovic and Dinara Safina.

== Past finals ==
=== Singles ===
Year	Champions	Runners-up	Score
↓ Hamburg (Clay) ↓
1896	(German Empire) Maren Thomsen	(German Empire) E. Lantzius	6–3, 6–2, 7–5
1897	(United Kingdom of Great Britain and Ireland) Blanche Hillyard	(United Kingdom of Great Britain and Ireland) Charlotte Cooper	6–3, 6–2, 6–2
1898	(United Kingdom of Great Britain and Ireland) Elsie Lane	(United Kingdom of Great Britain and Ireland) Toupie Lowther	7–5, 7–5
1899	(United Kingdom of Great Britain and Ireland) Charlotte Cooper	(German Empire) Clara von der Schulenburg	7–5, 6–4
1900	(United Kingdom of Great Britain and Ireland) Blanche Hillyard (2)	(United Kingdom of Great Britain and Ireland) Muriel Robb	2–6, 8–6, 7–5
1901	(United Kingdom of Great Britain and Ireland) Toupie Lowther	(United Kingdom of Great Britain and Ireland) Gladys Dudell	6–0, 6–0
1902	(German Empire) Mary Roß	(German Empire) Hilda Meyer	8–6, 6–0
1903	(United Kingdom of Great Britain and Ireland) Violet Pinckney	(German Empire) Hilda Meyer	6–2, 6–1
1904	(United Kingdom of Great Britain and Ireland) Elsie Lane (2)	(German Empire) L. Bergmann	6–3, 6–0
1905	(United Kingdom of Great Britain and Ireland) Elsie Lane (3)	(German Empire) K. Krug	6–0, 6–1
1906	(German Empire) Luise Berton	(United Kingdom of Great Britain and Ireland) Margaret Dewsbury	4–6, 6–3, 6–1
1907	(Austria-Hungary) Margit von Madarasz	(German Empire) Hedwig Neresheimer	7–5, 0–6, 6–2
1908	(Austria-Hungary) Margit von Madarasz (2)	(United Kingdom of Great Britain and Ireland) Rosamund Salusbury	2–6, 6–4, 6–0
1909	(German Empire) Anita Heimann	(German Empire) Mieken Rieck	6–4, 0–6, 6–4
1910	(German Empire) Mieken Rieck	(German Empire) Dora Köring	6–1, 6–3
1911	(German Empire) Mieken Rieck (2)	(Norway) Molla Bjurstedt	6–1, 4–6, 6–1
1912	(German Empire) Dora Köring	(German Empire) Anita Heimann	6–2 6–2
1913	(German Empire) Dora Köring (2)	(Austria-Hungary) Hedwig Neresheimer von Satzger	6–4, 6–4
1914- 1919	Not held		
1920	(Germany) Ilse Friedleben	(Germany) Lilly Müller Vormann	6–0, 6–0
1921	(Germany) Ilse Friedleben (2)	(Germany) Daisy Uhl	9–7, 6–1
1922	(Germany) Ilse Friedleben (3)	(Germany) Nelly Neppach	6–2, 6–1
1923	(Germany) Ilse Friedleben (4)	(Germany) Nelly Neppach	2–6, 9–7, 7–5
1924	(Germany) Ilse Friedleben (5)	(Germany) Nelly Neppach	6–2, 1–6, 6–3
1925	(Germany) Nelly Neppach	(Germany) Ilse Friedleben	2–6, 6–4, 10–8
1926	(Germany) Ilse Friedleben (6)	(Germany) Nelly Neppach	5–7, 6–4, 6–2
1927	(Germany) Cilly Aussem	(Germany) Ilse Friedleben	6–3, 6–3
1928	(Australia) Daphne Akhurst	(Germany) Cilly Aussem	2–6, 6–0, 6–4
1929	(Germany) Paula von Reznicek	(United Kingdom) Violet Chamberlain	6–2, 4–6, 6–0
1930	(Germany) Cilly Aussem (2)	(Germany) Hilde Krahwinkel	6–4, 6–4
1931	(Germany) Cilly Aussem (3)	(Germany) Irmgard Rost	6–1, 6–2
1932	(Switzerland) Lolette Payot	(Germany) Hilde Krahwinkel	6–2, 1–6, 6–4
1933	(Nazi Germany) Hilde Krahwinkel	(France) Sylvie Jung Henrotin	6–2, 6–1
1934	(Nazi Germany) Hilde Sperling (2)	(Nazi Germany) Cilly Aussem	6–2, 6–3
1935	(Nazi Germany) Hilde Sperling (3)	(Nazi Germany) Cilly Aussem	9–7, 6–0
1936	Not held (due to Berlin Olympic Games)		
1937	(Nazi Germany) Hilde Sperling (4)	(Nazi Germany) Marie-Louise Horn	4–6, 6–2, 6–2
1938	(Nazi Germany) Hilde Sperling (5)	(United Kingdom) Margot Lumb	6–1, 6–0
1939	(Nazi Germany) Hilde Sperling (6)	(Kingdom of Yugoslavia) Hella Kovac	6–0, 6–1
1940- 1947	Not held		
1948	(Allied-occupied Germany) Ursula Rosenow	(Allied-occupied Germany) Inge Pohmann	6–2, 8–6
1949	(Argentina) Mary Terán de Weiss	(West Germany) Inge Pohmann	6–2, 6–8, 9–7
1950	(United States) Dorothy Head	(West Germany) Ursula Heidtmann	6–3, 6–0
1951	(Australia) Nancye Bolton	(Argentina) Mary Terán de Weiss	6–3, 6–3
1952	(United States) Dorothy Head (2)	(West Germany) Erika Vollmer	6–1, 6–3
1953	(United States) Dorothy Knode (3)	(United Kingdom) Joy Mottram	6–0, 4–6, 6–4
1954	(United Kingdom) Joy Mottram	(West Germany) Inge Pohmann	2–6, 7–5, 6–2
1955	(Australia) Beryl Penrose	(West Germany) Erika Vollmer	6–4, 6–4
1956	(Australia) Thelma Long	(Italy) Silvana Lazzarino	7–5, 6–2
1957	(Mexico) Yola Ramírez	(Mexico) Rosie Reyes	7–5, 6–3
1958	(Australia) Lorraine Coghlan	(United Kingdom) Shirley Bloomer	6–4, 7–5
1959	(West Germany) Edda Buding	(Hungary) Zsuzsa Körmöczy	walkover
1960	(South Africa) Sandra Reynolds	(Brazil) Maria Bueno	7–5, 8–6
1961	(South Africa) Sandra Reynolds (2)	(Mexico) Yola Ramírez	5–7, 7–5, 6–1
1962	(South Africa) Sandra Reynolds Price (3)	(United Kingdom) Ann Haydon	4–6, 6–3, 7–5
1963	(South Africa) Renée Schuurman	(Australia) Lesley Turner	6–4, 1–6, 6–3
1964	(Australia) Margaret Smith	(Brazil) Maria Bueno	6–1, 6–1
1965	(Australia) Margaret Smith (2)	(West Germany) Edda Buding	6–3, 6–2
1966	(Australia) Margaret Smith (3)	(Brazil) Maria Bueno	8–6, 6–3
1967	(France) Françoise Dürr	(Australia) Lesley Turner	6–4, 6–4
1968	(South Africa) Annette Van Zyl	(Australia) Judy Tegart	6–1, 7–5
1969	(Australia) Judy Tegart	(West Germany) Helga Niessen	6–3, 6–4
1970	(West Germany) Helga Schultze-Hösl	(West Germany) Helga Niessen	6–3, 6–3
1971	(United States) Billie Jean King	(West Germany) Helga Masthoff	6–3, 6–2
1972	(West Germany) Helga Masthoff	(United States) Linda Tuero	6–3, 3–6 8–6
1973	(West Germany) Helga Masthoff (2)	(South Africa) Pat Walkden Pretorius	6–4, 6–1
1974	(West Germany) Helga Masthoff (3)	(Czechoslovakia) Martina Navratilova	6–4, 5–7, 6–3
1975	(Czechoslovakia) Renáta Tomanová	(Japan) Kazuko Sawamatsu	7–6, 5–7, 10–8
1976	(United Kingdom) Sue Barker	(Czechoslovakia) Renáta Tomanová	6–3, 6–1
1977	(United States) Laura duPont	(West Germany) Heidi Eisterlehner	6–1, 6–4
1978	(Socialist Federal Republic of Yugoslavia) Mima Jaušovec	(Romania) Virginia Ruzici	6–2, 6–3
↓ West Berlin (Clay) ↓
1979	(United States) Caroline Stoll	(Czechoslovakia) Regina Maršíková	7–6^{(7–4)}, 6–0
1981	(Czechoslovakia) Regina Maršíková	(Argentina) Ivanna Madruga-Osses	6–2, 6–1
1980	Not held to make room for Federation Cup which took place at same location.		
1982	(West Germany) Bettina Bunge	(United States) Kathy Rinaldi	6–2, 6–2
1983	(United States) Chris Evert-Lloyd	(United States) Kathleen Horvath	6–4, 7–6^{(7–1)}
1984	(West Germany) Claudia Kohde-Kilsch	(United States) Kathleen Horvath	7–6^{(10–8)}, 6–1
1985	(United States) Chris Evert-Lloyd (2)	(West Germany) Steffi Graf	6–4, 7–5
1986	(West Germany) Steffi Graf	(United States) Martina Navratilova	6–2, 6–3
1987	(West Germany) Steffi Graf (2)	(West Germany) Claudia Kohde-Kilsch	6–2, 6–3
1988	(West Germany) Steffi Graf (3)	(Czechoslovakia) Helena Suková	6–3, 6–2
1989	(West Germany) Steffi Graf (4)	(Argentina) Gabriela Sabatini	6–3, 6–1
1990	(Socialist Federal Republic of Yugoslavia) Monica Seles	(West Germany) Steffi Graf	6–4, 6–3
↓ Berlin (Clay) ↓
1991	(Germany) Steffi Graf (5)	(Spain) Arantxa Sánchez Vicario	6–3, 4–6, 7–6^{(8–6)}
1992	(Germany) Steffi Graf (6)	(Spain) Arantxa Sánchez Vicario	4–6, 7–5, 6–2
1993	(Germany) Steffi Graf (7)	(Argentina) Gabriela Sabatini	7–6^{(7–3)}, 2–6, 6–4
1994	(Germany) Steffi Graf (8)	(Netherlands) Brenda Schultz	7–6^{(8–6)}, 6–4
1995	(Spain) Arantxa Sánchez Vicario	(Bulgaria) Magdalena Maleeva	6–4, 6–1
1996	(Germany) Steffi Graf (9)	(Slovakia) Karina Habšudová	4–6, 6–2, 7–5
1997	(United States) Mary Joe Fernández	(France) Mary Pierce	6–4, 6–2
1998	(Spain) Conchita Martínez	(France) Amélie Mauresmo	6–4, 6–4
1999	(Switzerland) Martina Hingis	(France) Julie Halard-Decugis	6–0, 6–1
2000	(Spain) Conchita Martínez (2)	(South Africa) Amanda Coetzer	6–1, 6–2
2001	(France) Amélie Mauresmo	(United States) Jennifer Capriati	6–4, 2–6, 6–3
2002	(Belgium) Justine Henin	(United States) Serena Williams	6–2, 1–6, 7–6^{(7–5)}
2003	(Belgium) Justine Henin (2)	(Belgium) Kim Clijsters	6–4, 4–6, 7–5
2004	(France) Amélie Mauresmo (2)	(United States) Venus Williams	walkover
2005	(Belgium) Justine Henin (3)	(Russia) Nadia Petrova	6–3, 4–6, 6–3
2006	(Russia) Nadia Petrova	(Belgium) Justine Henin	4–6, 6–4, 7–5
2007	(Serbia) Ana Ivanovic	(Russia) Svetlana Kuznetsova	3–6, 6–4, 7–6^{(7–4)}
2008	(Russia) Dinara Safina	(Russia) Elena Dementieva	3–6, 6–2, 6–2
2009– 2019	Not held		
↓ Berlin (Grass) ↓
2020	Cancelled due to the COVID-19 pandemic.		
2021	(Russia) Liudmila Samsonova	(Switzerland) Belinda Bencic	1–6, 6–1, 6–3
2022	(Tunisia) Ons Jabeur	(Switzerland) Belinda Bencic	6–3, 2–1, ret.
2023	(Czech Republic) Petra Kvitová	(Croatia) Donna Vekić	6–2, 7–6^{(8–6)}
2024	(United States) Jessica Pegula	Anna Kalinskaya	6–7^{(0–7)}, 6–4, 7–6^{(7–3)}
2025	(Czech Republic) Markéta Vondroušová	(China) Wang Xinyu	7–6^{(12–10)}, 4–6, 6–2
2026	(Czech Republic) Linda Nosková	(United States) Jessica Pegula	6–4, 4–6, 6–3

=== Doubles ===
Year	Champions	Runners-up	Score
↓ Hamburg (Clay) ↓
1968	(South Africa) Annette Du Plooy (South Africa) Pat Walkden	(United Kingdom) Winnie Shaw (Australia) Judy Tegart	6–3, 7–5
1969	(Australia) Judy Tegart (West Germany) Helga Niessen	(West Germany) Edda Buding (West Germany) Helga Hösl Schultze	6–1, 6–4
1970	(Australia) Karen Krantzcke (Australia) Kerry Melville	(United Kingdom) Winnie Shaw (United Kingdom) Virginia Wade	6–0, 6–1
1971	(United States) Rosie Casals (United States) Billie Jean King	(West Germany) Helga Masthoff (West Germany) Heide Orth	6–2, 6–1
1972	(West Germany) Helga Masthoff (West Germany) Heide Orth	(United States) Wendy Overton (United States) Valerie Ziegenfuss	6–3, 2–6, 6–0
1973	(West Germany) Helga Masthoff (2) (West Germany) Heide Orth (2)	(United States) Kristien Kemmer (South Africa) Laura Rossouw	6–1, 6–2
1974	(West Germany) Helga Hösl (Argentina) Raquel Giscafré	(Czechoslovakia) Martina Navratilova (Czechoslovakia) Renáta Tomanová	6–3, 6–2
1975	(Australia) Dianne Fromholtz (Czechoslovakia) Renáta Tomanová	(Israel) Paulina Peisachov (Japan) Kazuko Sawamatsu	6–3, 6–2
1976	(South Africa) Linky Boshoff (South Africa) Ilana Kloss	(United States) Laura duPont (Australia) Wendy Turnbull	4–6, 7–5, 6–1
1977	(South Africa) Linky Boshoff (2) (South Africa) Ilana Kloss (2)	(Czechoslovakia) Regina Maršíková (Czechoslovakia) Renáta Tomanová	2–6, 6–4, 7–5
1978	(Socialist Federal Republic of Yugoslavia) Mima Jaušovec (Romania) Virginia Ruzici	(West Germany) Katja Ebbinghaus (West Germany) Helga Masthoff	6–4, 5–7, 6–0
↓ West Berlin (Clay) ↓
1979	(United States) Rosie Casals (2) (Australia) Wendy Turnbull	(Australia) Evonne Goolagong (Australia) Kerry Reid	6–2, 7–5
1981	(South Africa) Rosalyn Fairbank (South Africa) Tanya Harford	(United Kingdom) Sue Barker (Czechoslovakia) Renáta Tomanová	6–3, 6–4
1980	Not held to make room for Federation Cup which took place at same location.		
1982	(South Africa) Liz Gordon (South Africa) Beverly Mould	(West Germany) Bettina Bunge (West Germany) Claudia Kohde-Kilsch	6–3, 6–4
1983	(United Kingdom) Jo Durie (United Kingdom) Anne Hobbs	(West Germany) Claudia Kohde-Kilsch (West Germany) Eva Pfaff	6–4, 7–6^{(7–2)}
1984	(United Kingdom) Anne Hobbs (2) (United States) Candy Reynolds	(United States) Kathleen Horvath (Romania) Virginia Ruzici	6–3, 4–6, 7–6
1985	(West Germany) Claudia Kohde-Kilsch (Czechoslovakia) Helena Suková	(West Germany) Steffi Graf (France) Catherine Tanvier	6–4, 6–1
1986	(West Germany) Steffi Graf (Czechoslovakia) Helena Suková (2)	(Czechoslovakia) Martina Navratilova (Hungary) Andrea Temesvári	7–5, 6–2
1987	(West Germany) Claudia Kohde-Kilsch (2) (Czechoslovakia) Helena Suková (3)	(Sweden) Catarina Lindqvist (Denmark) Tine Scheuer-Larsen	6–1, 6–2
1988	(France) Isabelle Demongeot (France) Nathalie Tauziat	(West Germany) Claudia Kohde-Kilsch (Czechoslovakia) Helena Suková	6–2, 4–6, 6–4
1989	(Australia) Elizabeth Smylie (Australia) Janine Tremelling	(South Africa) Lise Gregory (United States) Gretchen Magers	5–7, 6–3, 6–2
1990	(Australia) Nicole Provis (South Africa) Elna Reinach	(Australia) Hana Mandlíková (Czechoslovakia) Jana Novotná	6–2, 6–1
↓ Berlin (Clay) ↓
1991	(Soviet Union) Larisa Neiland (Soviet Union) Natasha Zvereva	(Australia) Nicole Provis (South Africa) Elna Reinach	6–3, 6–3
1992	(Czechoslovakia) Jana Novotná (Latvia) Larisa Neiland (2)	(United States) Gigi Fernández (Commonwealth of Independent States) Natalia Zvereva	7–6^{(7–5)}, 4–6, 7–5
1993	(United States) Gigi Fernández (Belarus) Natasha Zvereva (2)	(United States) Debbie Graham (Netherlands) Brenda Schultz	6–1, 6–3
1994	(United States) Gigi Fernández (2) (Belarus) Natasha Zvereva (3)	(Czech Republic) Jana Novotná (Spain) Arantxa Sánchez Vicario	6–3, 7–6^{(7–2)}
1995	(South Africa) Amanda Coetzer (Argentina) Inés Gorrochategui	(Latvia) Larisa Savchenko (Argentina) Gabriela Sabatini	4–6, 7–6, 6–2
1996	(United States) Meredith McGrath (Latvia) Larisa Neiland (3)	(Switzerland) Martina Hingis (Czech Republic) Helena Suková	6–1, 5–7, 7–6^{(7–4)}
1997	(United States) Lindsay Davenport (Czech Republic) Jana Novotná (2)	(United States) Gigi Fernández (Belarus) Natasha Zvereva	6–3, 3–6, 6–2
1998	(United States) Lindsay Davenport (2) (Belarus) Natasha Zvereva (4)	(France) Alexandra Fusai (France) Nathalie Tauziat	6–3, 6–0
1999	(France) Alexandra Fusai (France) Nathalie Tauziat (2)	(Czech Republic) Jana Novotná (Argentina) Patricia Tarabini	6–3, 7–5
2000	(Spain) Conchita Martínez (Spain) Arantxa Sánchez Vicario	(South Africa) Amanda Coetzer (United States) Corina Morariu	3–6, 6–2, 7–6^{(9–7)}
2001	(Belgium) Els Callens (United States) Meghann Shaughnessy	(Zimbabwe) Cara Black (Russia) Elena Likhovtseva	6–4, 6–3
2002	(Russia) Elena Dementieva (Slovakia) Janette Husárová	(Slovakia) Daniela Hantuchová (Spain) Arantxa Sánchez Vicario	0–6, 7–6^{(7–3)}, 6–2
2003	(Spain) Virginia Ruano Pascual (Argentina) Paola Suárez	(Belgium) Kim Clijsters (Japan) Ai Sugiyama	6–3, 4–6, 6–4
2004	(Russia) Nadia Petrova (United States) Meghann Shaughnessy (2)	(Slovakia) Janette Husárová (Spain) Conchita Martínez	6–2, 2–6, 6–1
2005	(Russia) Elena Likhovtseva (Russia) Vera Zvonareva	(Zimbabwe) Cara Black (United States) Liezel Huber	3–6, 6–3, 6–1
2006	(China) Yan Zi (China) Zheng Jie	(Russia) Elena Dementieva (Italy) Flavia Pennetta	6–2, 6–3
2007	(United States) Lisa Raymond (Australia) Samantha Stosur	(Italy) Tathiana Garbin (Italy) Roberta Vinci	6–3, 6–4
2008	(Zimbabwe) Cara Black (United States) Liezel Huber	(Spain) Nuria Llagostera Vives (Spain) María José Martínez Sánchez	6–2, 6–2
2009- 2019	Not held		
↓ Berlin (Grass) ↓
2020	Cancelled due to the COVID-19 pandemic.		
2021	(Belarus) Victoria Azarenka (Belarus) Aryna Sabalenka	(United States) Nicole Melichar (Netherlands) Demi Schuurs	4–6, 7–5, [10–4]
2022	(Australia) Storm Sanders (Czech Republic) Kateřina Siniaková	(France) Alizé Cornet (Switzerland) Jil Teichmann	6–4, 6–3
2023	(France) Caroline Garcia (Brazil) Luisa Stefani	(Czech Republic) Kateřina Siniaková (Czech Republic) Markéta Vondroušová	4–6, 7–6^{(10–8)}, [10–4]
2024	(China) Wang Xinyu (China) Zheng Saisai	(Chinese Taipei) Chan Hao-ching; Veronika Kudermetova	6–2, 7–5
2025	(Slovakia) Tereza Mihalíková (United Kingdom) Olivia Nicholls	(Italy) Sara Errani (Italy) Jasmine Paolini	4−6, 6−2, [10−6]
2026	Ekaterina Alexandrova (Czech Republic) Linda Nosková	(Italy) Sara Errani (United States) Nicole Melichar-Martinez	6−2, 6−4

== Tournament names ==
- 1896–1927:German Championships
- 1928–1948:German International Championships
- 1949–1970:West German Championships
- 1971–1979: German Open
- 1980: No tournament
- 1981–1988: Fila German Open
- 1989–1990: Lufthansa Cup
- 1991–1992: Lufthansa Cup German Open
- 1993–2000: German Open
- 2001–2002: Eurocard German Open
- 2003: MasterCard German Open
- 2004: Ladies German Open
- 2005: Qatar Total German Open
- 2006–2008: Qatar Telecom German Open
- 2021–2023: bett1open
- 2024: ecotrans Ladies Open
- 2025: Berlin Tennis Open by Hylo
- 2026: Vanda Pharmaceuticals Berlin Tennis Open

== See also ==
- German Open Tennis Championships
- WTA Hamburg
