= German National Indoor Championships (tennis) =

Defunct tennis tournament
- Tour: ILTF World Circuit (1961–72); ILTF Independent Tour (1973–75)
- Founded: 1961; 64 years ago
- Abolished: 1996; 29 years ago
- Location: Various
- Venue: Various
- Surface: Wood (indoors); Carpet (indoors)

The German National Indoor Championships also called the German Closed Indoor Championships was a men's and women's closed indoor tennis tournament founded in 1961 as the West German National Indoor Championships or West German Closed Indoor Championships. The tournament was organised by the German Tennis Federation and was played on indoor wood courts, then later carpet courts at various locations in Germany until 1996

The championships were part ILTF European Circuit a sub circuit of the ILTF World Circuit until 1972 it then became part of the ILTF Independent Tour from 1973 until it was discontinued.

== History ==
In 1897 an unofficial German National Outdoor Championships (German players only) were established. In 1902 following the creation the German Lawn Tennis Association they became official. Following World War II when Germany was divided into East and West this tournament was then re branded as the West German National Outdoor Championships for West Germany and the East German National Outdoor Championships for East Germany.

In 1961 the West German National Indoor Championships were established. The first championships were played in Dortmund, and the first winners of the singles events were Peter Scholl (men's), and Edda Buding (women's). The championships were not held in 1964 and 1968. In 1990 following the reunification of Germany both the east and west events were merged into a single German Closed Indoor Championships, with the same for the outdoor championships. In 1980 two editions of tournament was held this year the first in January, and the second in December due to the German Tennis Federation moving the event till the latter date and continued to stage them at the end of the year. In 1996 six years after unification both the German Closed Outdoor Championships and German Closed Indoor Championships ended and were merged into a single German National Championships to be played either indoors or outdoors.

== Finals ==
Notes: In 1980 the championships had up to that point been held in either January or February, the scheduled was changed to now stage them in December (*) denotes January edition (**) denotes December edition. Official sources list only the winners of this event where a runner up is not shown or the score sections have been blanked.

=== Men's singles ===
(incomplete roll)

Year	Location	Champions	Runners-up	Score
↓ ILTF World Circuit ↓
1961	Dortmund	(West Germany) Peter Scholl	(West Germany) Wolfgang Stuck	11–9, 6–1, 6–3.
1962	Dortmund	(West Germany) Adolf Kreinberg	(West Germany) Wolfgang Stuck	4–6, 3–6, 6–4, 6–3, 6–4.
1963	Dortmund	(West Germany) Wolfgang Stuck	(West Germany) Peter Scholl	6–1, 6–3, 6–2.
↓ Open era ↓
1969	Hanover	(West Germany) Hans-Jürgen Pohmann	(West Germany) Jürgen Fassbender	3–6, 8–6, 5–7, 7–5, 6–2.
1970	Hanover	(West Germany) Uwe Gottschalk	(West Germany) Karl Meiler	6–4, 6–4, 6–0.
1971	Hanover	(West Germany) Karl Meiler	(West Germany) Jürgen Fassbender	6–2, 7–5, 9–7.
1972	Hanover	(West Germany) Jürgen Fassbender	(West Germany) Hans-Jürgen Pohmann	6–2, 3–6, 3–6, 6–4, 6–4.
1973	Hanover	(West Germany) Frank Gebert	(West Germany) Attila Korpás	w.o.
1976	Hamburg	(West Germany) Werner Zirngibl	(West Germany) Jürgen Fassbender	6–7, 6–4, 6–7, 7–5 6–3.
1977	Hamburg	(West Germany) Ulrich Marten	(West Germany) Klaus Eberhard	6–4, 6–7, 6–3, 0–6, 6–0.
1978	Hamburg	(West Germany) Ulrich Pinner	(West Germany) Peter Elter	7–6, 6–3, 6–2.
1979	Hamburg	(West Germany) Ulrich Marten (2)	(West Germany) Klaus Eberhard	6–7, 6–2, 7–5, 4–6, 7–5.
1980 *	Hamburg	(West Germany) Ulrich Marten (3)	(West Germany) Werner Zirngibl	3–6, 7–6, 6–3, 6–2.
1980 **	Hamburg	(West Germany) Klaus Eberhard	(West Germany) Reinhart Probst	6–4, 6–3, 6–0.
1981	Hamburg	(West Germany) Karl Meiler (2)	(West Germany) Frank Gebert	7–6, 6–2.
1982	Neumünster	(West Germany) Hans-Dieter Beutel	(West Germany) Wolfgang Popp	6–7, 6–3, 6–2.
1983	Landshut	(West Germany) Wolfgang Popp	(West Germany) Karl Meiler	7–6, 6–2, 4–6, 4–6, 7–6
1984	Mainz	(West Germany) Peter Pfannkoch		
1985	Mainz	(West Germany) Eric Jelen		
1986	Mainz	(West Germany) Patrik Kühnen		
1987	Mainz	(West Germany) Eric Jelen (2)		
1988	Mainz	(West Germany) Markus Zoecke		
1990	Mainz	(West Germany) Michael Stich		
1992	Bremen	(West Germany) Alexander Mronz		
1996	Mainz	(West Germany) Nicolas Kiefer		
For the successor event see German National Championships

=== Women's singles ===
(incomplete roll)

Year	Location	Champions	Runners-up	Score
↓ ILTF World Circuit ↓
1961	Dortmund	(West Germany) Edda Buding	(West Germany) Brigitte Forstendorf	6–3, 6–2
1962	Dortmund	(West Germany) Edda Buding (2)		
1963	Dortmund	(West Germany) Almut Sturm		
↓ Open era ↓
1969	Hanover	(West Germany) Heide Orth		
1970	Hanover	(West Germany) Edith Winkens	(West Germany) Kerstin Seelbach	6–4, 6–2
1971	Hanover	(West Germany) Heide Orth (2)		
1972	Hanover	(West Germany) Heide Orth (3)		
1973	Hanover	(West Germany) Heide Orth (4)		
1976	Hamburg	(West Germany) Helga Masthoff		
1977	Hamburg	(West Germany) Heidi Eisterlehner		
1978	Hamburg	(West Germany) Sylvia Hanika		
1979	Hamburg	(West Germany) Katja Ebbinghaus		
1980 *	Hamburg	(West Germany) Eva Pfaff		
1980 **	Hamburg	(West Germany) Heidi Eisterlehner (2)		
1981	Neumünster	(West Germany) Claudia Kohde-Kilsch		
1982	Landshut	(West Germany) Eva Pfaff (2)		
1983	Mainz	(West Germany) Eva Pfaff (3)		
1984	Mainz	(West Germany) Steffi Graf	(West Germany) Isabel Cueto	6–2, 6–0
1985	Mainz	(West Germany) Steffi Graf (2)		
1986	Mainz	(West Germany) Steffi Graf (3)		
1987	Mainz	(West Germany) Christina Singer	(West Germany) Silke Meier	4–6, 7–6, 6–4
1988	Mainz	(West Germany) Steffi Menning		
1990	Mainz	(West Germany) Claudia Porwik		
1992	Bremen	(West Germany) Claudia Porwik (2)		
1996	Mainz	(West Germany) Christina Singer (3)		
For the successor event see German National Championships
