= 1974 German Open (tennis) =

- Date: 20–26 May
- Edition: 64th
- Category: Grand Prix (B)
- Draw: 64S / 32D
- Prize money: $50,000
- Surface: Clay / outdoor
- Location: Hamburg, West Germany
- Venue: Am Rothenbaum

Champions

Men's singles
- (United States) Eddie Dibbs

Women's singles
- (West Germany) Helga Masthoff

Men's doubles
- (West Germany) Jürgen Fassbender / (West Germany) Hans-Jürgen Pohmann

Women's doubles
- (West Germany) Helga Hösl / (Argentina) Raquel Giscafré

Mixed doubles
- (West Germany) Heide Orth / (West Germany) Jürgen Fassbender
- German Open

The 1974 Grand Prix German Open was a combined men's and women's tennis tournament played on outdoor red clay courts. It was the 64th edition of the event and was part of the 1974 Commercial Union Assurance Grand Prix circuit. It took place at the Am Rothenbaum in Hamburg, West Germany, from 20 May through 26 May 1974. Eddie Dibbs and Helga Masthoff won the singles titles.

== Finals ==
=== Men's singles ===
(United States) Eddie Dibbs defeated (West Germany) Hans-Joachim Plötz 6–2, 6–2, 6–3

=== Women's singles ===
(West Germany) Helga Masthoff defeated (Czechoslovakia) Martina Navratilova 6–4, 5–7, 6–3

=== Men's doubles ===
(West Germany) Jürgen Fassbender / (West Germany) Hans-Jürgen Pohmann defeated (United States) Brian Gottfried / (Mexico) Raúl Ramírez 6–3, 6–4, 6–4

=== Women's doubles ===
(West Germany) Helga Hösl / (Argentina) Raquel Giscafré defeated (Czechoslovakia) Martina Navratilova / (Czechoslovakia) Renáta Tomanová 6–3, 6–2

=== Mixed doubles ===
(West Germany) Heide Orth / (West Germany) Jürgen Fassbender defeated (West Germany) Katja Ebbinghaus / Hans-Jürgen Pohmann 7–6, 6–3
