= Graf–Navratilova rivalry =

Tennis rivalry

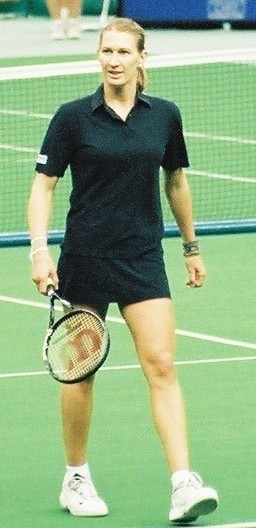
Steffi Graf (22 Singles majors)

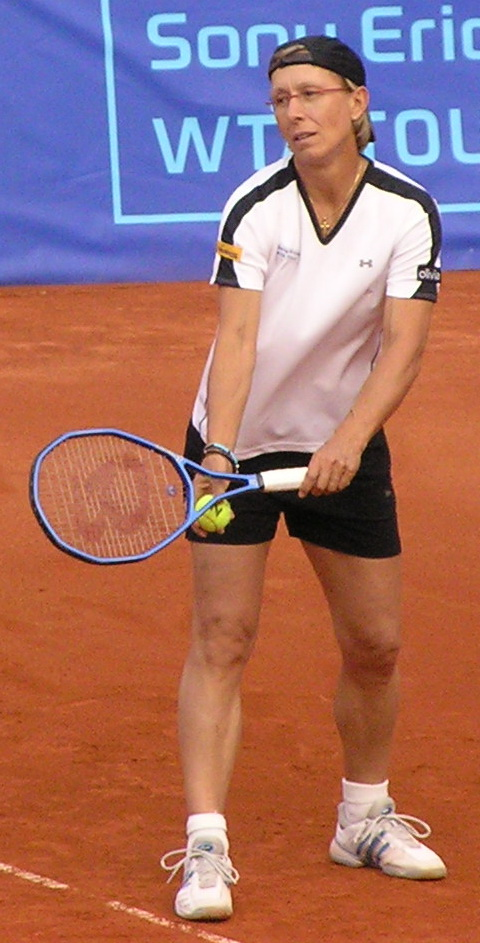
Martina Navratilova (18 Singles majors)

The Graf–Navratilova rivalry was a tennis rivalry between Steffi Graf and Martina Navratilova, widely regarded as two of the greatest tennis players of all time. They met 18 times during their careers, and their head-to-head is even at 9–9, with Graf having a 4–2 record in major finals but Navratilova having a 5–4 record in overall major matches (winning their last major meeting despite being 34 at the time). They contested three consecutive Wimbledon singles finals (1987, 1988, 1989). Notably, despite how even their rivalry was, the age difference between Navratilova and Graf is nearly 13 years.

== List of all matches ==
Legend	Graf	Navratilova
Grand Slam	4	5
WTA Tour Championships	1	2
WTA Tour Events	4	2
Total	9	9

Graf–Navratilova (9–9)

No.	Date	Tournament	Surface	Round	Winner	Score	Graf	Navratilova
1.	1985	US Open	Hard	Semifinals	Navratilova	6–2, 6–3	0	1
2.	1985	Maybelline Classic	Hard	Final	Navratilova	6–3, 6–1	0	2
3.	1986	Virginia Slims Championships	Carpet	Semifinals	Navratilova	6–2, 6–2	0	3
4.	1986	German Open	Clay	Final	Graf	6–2, 6–3	1	3
5.	1986	US Open	Hard	Semifinals	Navratilova	6–1, 6–7^{(3–7)}, 7–6^{(10–8)}	1	4
6.	1986	Virginia Slims Championships	Carpet	Final	Navratilova	7–6^{(8–6)}, 6–3, 6–2	1	5
7.	1987	Miami Open	Hard	Semifinals	Graf	6–3, 6–2	2	5
8.	1987	Roland Garros	Clay	Final	Graf	6–4, 4–6, 8–6	3	5
9.	1987	Wimbledon	Grass	Final	Navratilova	7–5, 6–3	3	6
10.	1987	US Open	Hard	Final	Navratilova	7–6^{(7–4)}, 6–1	3	7
11.	1988	Wimbledon	Grass	Final	Graf	5–7, 6–2, 6–1	4	7
12.	1989	Wimbledon	Grass	Final	Graf	6–2, 6–7^{(1–7)}, 6–1	5	7
13.	1989	US Open	Hard	Final	Graf	3–6, 7–5, 6–1	6	7
14.	1989	Virginia Slims Championships	Carpet	Final	Graf	6–4, 7–5, 2–6, 6–2	7	7
15.	1991	US Open	Hard	Semifinals	Navratilova	7–6^{(7–2)}, 6–7^{(6–8)}, 6–4	7	8
16.	1992	Zurich Open	Carpet	Final	Graf	2–6, 7–5, 7–5	8	8
17.	1993	Pan Pacific Open	Carpet	Semifinals	Navratilova	4–6, 6–3, 6–3	8	9
18.	1994	Pan Pacific Open	Carpet	Final	Graf	6–2, 6–4	9	9

== Famous matches ==
=== 1986 US Open semifinal ===
In semifinals of the 1986 US Open, in the most anticipated match of the tournament, No. 1 Martina Navratilova prevailed over 17-year-old and No. 3 Steffi Graf with a scoreline of 6–1, 6–7^{(3–7)}, 7–6^{(10–8)}. The match was suspended with Navratilova leading 4–1 in the first set and resumed the next day. Navratilova saved three match points in the epic spread over two days. With her win in the final, Navratilova became the first woman in the Open Era to win a major after saving match points en route.

=== 1987 French Open final ===
In the final of the 1987 French Open, No. 2 Graf defeated No. 1 Navratilova to win her first Grand Slam title with a scoreline of 6–4, 4–6, 8–6 in what was considered a changing of the guard. Graf overcame a 3–5 deficit in the final set to eventually win it 8–6.

=== 1988 Wimbledon final ===
In the final of the 1988 Wimbledon No. 1 Steffi Graf defeated No. 2 and six-time defending champion Martina Navratilova with 5–7, 6–2, 6–1 to win her third slam title on her way to the Golden Slam that year. Navratilova had a 7–5, 2–0 lead before Graf won 12 of the last 13 games, breaking Navratilova in all of her last 7 service games. Graf's win is considered by many as the best performance ever of a female tennis player.

=== 1991 US Open semifinal ===
In the semifinals of the 1991 US Open, No. 6 Navratilova beat No. 1 Graf in an epic, winning with a score line of 7–6^{(7–2)}, 6–7^{(6–8)}, 6–4, in what is considered one of the greatest matches in US Open history. She would ultimately lose the final to Monica Seles.

== Breakdown of the rivalry ==
- Hard courts: Navratilova, 5–2
- Clay courts: Graf, 2–0
- Grass courts: Graf, 2–1
- Carpet courts: Equal, 3–3
- Grand Slam matches: Navratilova, 5–4
- Grand Slam finals: Graf, 4–2
- Year-End Championships matches: Navratilova, 2–1
- Year-End Championships finals: Equal, 1–1
- Fed Cup matches: None
- All finals: Graf, 8–4
- All matches: Equal, 9–9

=== Set tallies ===
Graf	Set score	Navratilova
1	8–6	0
2	7–6	5
4	7–5	2
4	6–4	2
2	6–3	7
6	6–2	6
3	6–1	3
0	6–0	0
22	Total sets	25
224	Total games	232

== See also ==
- List of tennis rivalries
- List of Grand Slam related tennis records
