= 1973 German Open (tennis) =

- Date: 11–17 June
- Edition: 63rd
- Category: Grand Prix (B)
- Draw: 64S / 32D
- Prize money: $50,000
- Surface: Clay / outdoor
- Location: Hamburg, West Germany
- Venue: Am Rothenbaum

Champions

Men's singles
- (United States) Eddie Dibbs

Women's singles
- (West Germany) Helga Masthoff

Men's doubles
- (West Germany) Jürgen Fassbender / (West Germany) Hans-Jürgen Pohmann

Women's doubles
- (West Germany) Helga Masthoff / (West Germany) Heide Orth
- German Open

The 1973 German Open was a combined men's and women's tennis tournament played on outdoor clay courts. It was the 63rd edition of the event and was part of the 1973 Commercial Union Assurance Grand Prix circuit. It took place at the Am Rothenbaum in Hamburg, West Germany, from 11 June until 17 June 1973. Eddie Dibbs and Helga Masthoff won the singles titles.

== Finals ==
=== Men's singles ===
(United States) Eddie Dibbs defeated (West Germany) Karl Meiler 6–1, 3–6, 7–6, 6–3

=== Women's singles ===
(West Germany) Helga Masthoff defeated (South Africa) Pat Pretorius 6–4, 6–1

=== Men's doubles ===
(West Germany) Jürgen Fassbender / (West Germany) Hans-Jürgen Pohmann defeated (Spain) Manuel Orantes / (Romania) Ion Țiriac 7–6, 7–6, 7–6

=== Women's doubles ===
(West Germany) Helga Masthoff / (West Germany) Heide Orth defeated (United States) Kristien Kemmer / (South Africa) Laura Rossouw 6–1, 6–2
