= 1987 Fila German Open =

- Date: 11–17 May
- Edition: 76th
- Category: Category 3
- Draw: 56S / 24D
- Prize money: $150,000
- Surface: Clay / outdoor
- Location: West Berlin, West Germany
- Venue: Rot-Weiss Tennis Club

Champions

Singles
- (West Germany) Steffi Graf

Doubles
- (West Germany) Claudia Kohde-Kilsch (Czechoslovakia) Helena Suková
- WTA German Open

The 1987 Fila German Open was a women's tennis tournament played on outdoor clay courts at the Rot-Weiss Tennis Club in West Berlin, West Germany that was part of the Category 3 tier of the 1987 Virginia Slims World Championship Series. It was the 76th edition of the tournament and was held from 11 May through 17 May 1987. First-seeded Steffi Graf won the singles title, her second consecutive at the event, and earned $29,000 first-prize money.

== Finals ==
=== Singles ===
(West Germany) Steffi Graf defeated (West Germany) Claudia Kohde-Kilsch 6–2, 6–3

- It was Graf's 6th singles title of the year and the 14th of her career.

=== Doubles ===
(West Germany) Claudia Kohde-Kilsch / (Czechoslovakia) Helena Suková defeated (Sweden) Catarina Lindqvist / (Denmark) Tine Scheuer-Larsen 6–1, 6–2
