= 1978 German Open (tennis) =

1978 Grand Prix German Open and WTA German Open
- Date: 15–21 May
- Edition: 68th
- Category: Grand Prix (Four star) (men); Colgate Series (A) (women)
- Draw: 64S / 32D
- Prize money: $175,000 (men) $35,000 (women)
- Surface: Clay / outdoor
- Location: Hamburg, West Germany
- Venue: Am Rothenbaum

Champions

Men's singles
- (Argentina) Guillermo Vilas

Women's singles
- (Socialist Federal Republic of Yugoslavia) Mima Jaušovec

Men's doubles
- (Netherlands) Tom Okker / (Poland) Wojciech Fibak

Women's doubles
- (Socialist Federal Republic of Yugoslavia) Mima Jaušovec / (Romania) Virginia Ruzici
- Grand Prix German Open WTA German Open

The 1978 German Open was a combined men's and women's tennis tournament played on outdoor red clay courts. The men's tournament was part of the 1978 Colgate-Palmolive Grand Prix circuit, categorized as a four-star event, while the women's tournament was part of the Colgate Series and classified as an A category event. It was the 68th edition of the tournament and took place at the Am Rothenbaum in Hamburg, West Germany, from 15 May through 21 May 1978. Guillermo Vilas and Mima Jaušovec, both first-seeded, won the singles titles.

== Finals ==
=== Men's singles ===
(Argentina) Guillermo Vilas defeated (Poland) Wojciech Fibak 6–2, 6–4, 6–2

=== Women's singles ===
(Socialist Federal Republic of Yugoslavia) Mima Jaušovec defeated (Romania) Virginia Ruzici 6–2, 6–3

=== Men's doubles ===
(Netherlands) Tom Okker / (Poland) Wojciech Fibak defeated (Spain) Antonio Muñoz / (Paraguay) Víctor Pecci 6–2, 6–4

=== Women's doubles ===
(Socialist Federal Republic of Yugoslavia) Mima Jaušovec / (Romania) Virginia Ruzici defeated (West Germany) Katja Ebbinghaus / (West Germany) Helga Masthoff 6–4, 5–7, 6–0
