= 1984 WTA German Open =

- Date: 14–20 May
- Edition: 73rd
- Category: World Championship Series
- Draw: 56S / 32D
- Prize money: $150,000
- Surface: Clay / outdoor
- Location: West Berlin, West Germany
- Venue: Rot-Weiss Tennis Club

Champions

Singles
- (West Germany) Claudia Kohde-Kilsch

Doubles
- (United Kingdom) Anne Hobbs / (United States) Candy Reynolds
- WTA German Open

The 1984 WTA German Open was a women's tennis tournament played on outdoor clay courts in West Berlin, West Germany that was part of the 1984 Virginia Slims World Championship Series. It was the 73rd edition of the tournament and was held from 14 May through 20 May 1984. Sixth-seeded Claudia Kohde-Kilsch won the singles title and earned $27,500 first-prize money.

== Finals ==
=== Singles ===
(West Germany) Claudia Kohde-Kilsch defeated (United States) Kathleen Horvath 7–6, 6–1

- It was Kohde-Kilsch's 3rd title of the year and the 9th of her career.

=== Doubles ===
(United Kingdom) Anne Hobbs / (United States) Candy Reynolds defeated (United States) Kathleen Horvath / (Romania) Virginia Ruzici 6–3, 4–6, 7–6

- It was Hobbs' 2nd title of the year and the 8th of her career. It was Reynolds' 2nd title of the year and the 19th of her career.
