= 1989 Lufthansa Cup – Singles =

Singles
- 1989 Lufthansa Cup
- 1988 Champion: (West Germany) Steffi Graf

Final
- Champion: (West Germany) Steffi Graf
- Runner-up: (Argentina) Gabriela Sabatini
- Score: 6–3, 6–1

Details
- Draw: 56
- Seeds: 16

Events
| Singles | Doubles |
| ← 1988 · | WTA German Open | · 1990 → |

Steffi Graf was the defending champion going into the final against her rival Gabriela Sabatini. Just the previous month, Sabatini defeated Steffi Graf 3–6, 6–3, 7–5 in the final at Amelia Island, Florida. Now, in her native Germany, Steffi would turn the tables against Sabatini, beating her 6–3, 6–1. Prior to this match, Sabatini had played in four finals in 1989, with her winning twice. For Steffi, this victory was her seventh of the year, and marked the sixteenth time out of nineteen matches she had beaten Sabatini.

== Seeds ==
A champion seed is indicated in bold text while text in italics indicates the round in which that seed was eliminated. The top eight seeds received a bye to the second round.

1. (West Germany) **Steffi Graf (champion)**
2. (Argentina) Gabriela Sabatini (final)
3. (Czechoslovakia) Helena Suková (third round)
4. (Bulgaria) Katerina Maleeva (third round)
5. (United States) Mary Joe Fernández (third round)
6. (Canada) Helen Kelesi (semifinals)
7. (Italy) Sandra Cecchini (quarterfinals)
8. (West Germany) Sylvia Hanika (quarterfinals)
9. (Czechoslovakia) Radka Zrubáková (third round)
10. (Austria) Barbara Paulus (quarterfinals)
11. (Argentina) Bettina Fulco (second round)
12. (France) Nathalie Tauziat (third round)
13. (United States) Terry Phelps (first round)
14. (Australia) Nicole Provis (first round)
15. (France) Isabelle Demongeot (first round)
16. (United States) Gretchen Magers (first round)

== Draw ==
=== Key ===
- Q = Qualifier
- WC = Wild card
- LL = Lucky loser
- Alt = Alternate
- ITF = ITF entry
- PR = Protected ranking
- SR = Special ranking
- SE = Special exempt
- JE = Junior exempt
- JR = Junior Accelerator Programme entrant
- CO = College Accelerator Programme entrant
- NG = Next Gen Accelerator Program entrant
- w/o = Walkover
- r = Retired
- d = Defaulted

=== Finals ===
Semifinals
1 | (West Germany) **Steffi Graf** | **6** | **6**
6 | (Canada) Helen Kelesi | 2 | 0
(West Germany) Isabel Cueto | 2 | 1
2 | (Argentina) **Gabriela Sabatini** | **6** | **6**

Final
1 | (West Germany) **Steffi Graf** | **6** | **6**
2 | (Argentina) Gabriela Sabatini | 3 | 1

=== Top half ===
==== Section 1 ====
First round
(France) N Herreman | **6** | 0 | 6
(Denmark) **T Scheuer-Larsen** | 3 | **6** | **7**
(West Germany) K Düll | **6** | 3 | 6
(Brazil) **N Dias** | 4 | **6** | **7**
(Czechoslovakia) **J Pospíšilová** | **6** | **7**
16 | (United States) G Magers | 3 | 6
12 | (France) **N Tauziat** | 4 | **7** | **7**
(Socialist Federal Republic of Yugoslavia) S Goleš | **6** | 5 | 6
(Poland) **I Kuczyńska** | 2 | **6** | **6**
(Canada) R Simpson | **6** | 1 | 3
(United States) A Grossman | 3 | **6** | 1
(Argentina) **P Tarabini** | **6** | 4 | **6**

Second round
1 | (West Germany) **S Graf** | **7** | **6**
(Denmark) T Scheuer-Larsen | 5 | 4
(Brazil) **N Dias** | 2 | **7** | **6**
(Czechoslovakia) J Pospíšilová | **6** | 6 | 3
12 | (France) **N Tauziat** | **6** | **6**
(Poland) I Kuczyńska | 1 | 2
(Argentina) P Tarabini | 2 | 4
7 | (Italy) **S Cecchini** | **6** | **6**

Third round
1 | (West Germany) **S Graf** | **6** | **6**
(Brazil) N Dias | 0 | 0
12 | (France) N Tauziat | 5 | 2
7 | (Italy) **S Cecchini** | **7** | **6**

Quarterfinals
1 | (West Germany) **S Graf** | **6** | **6**
7 | (Italy) S Cecchini | 2 | 0

==== Section 2 ====
First round
(Australia) L Field | 3 | 3
Q | (France) **M-C Damas** | **6** | **6**
(West Germany) **S Meier** | **7** | **6**
Q | (Czechoslovakia) R Maršíková | 5 | 1
(South Africa) E Reinach | 3 | 0
10 | (Austria) **B Paulus** | **6** | **6**
14 | (Australia) N Provis | 3 | 3
(Hungary) **A Temesvári** | **6** | **6**
(Australia) **J-A Faull** | 6 | **7** | **6**
(Netherlands) B Schultz | **7** | 6 | 4
(South Africa) **D Van Rensburg** | **6** | **6**
(West Germany) V Martinek | 4 | 4

Second round
3 | (Czechoslovakia) **H Suková** | **6** | **6**
Q | (France) M-C Damas | 1 | 1
(West Germany) S Meier | 3 | 3
10 | (Austria) **B Paulus** | **6** | **6**
(Hungary) **A Temesvári** | **w/o**
(Australia) J-A Faull
(South Africa) D Van Rensburg | 3 | 1
6 | (Canada) **H Kelesi** | **6** | **6**

Third round
3 | (Czechoslovakia) H Suková | **7** | 5 | 4
10 | (Austria) **B Paulus** | 6 | **7** | **6**
(Hungary) A Temesvári | 3 | 2
6 | (Canada) **H Kelesi** | **6** | **6**

Quarterfinals
10 | (Austria) B Paulus | 3 | **7** | 3
6 | (Canada) **H Kelesi** | **6** | 5 | **6**

=== Bottom half ===
==== Section 3 ====
First round
(West Germany) **C Porwik** | **7** | **6**
Q | (Argentina) A Villagrán | 6 | 3
(South Africa) **A Coetzer** | **6** | **6**
(Greece) A Kanellopoulou | 4 | 4
(Czechoslovakia) **R Rajchrtová** | **6** | **6**
13 | (United States) T Phelps | 1 | 4
15 | (France) I Demongeot | **7** | 6 | 3
(West Germany) **I Cueto** | 6 | **7** | **6**
(West Germany) **W Probst** | **6** | **6**
(Australia) E Smylie | 3 | 2
(Italy) **L Lapi** | **7** | **6**
(Czechoslovakia) I Budařová | 5 | 3

Second round
5 | (United States) **M J Fernández** | 5 | **6** | **6**
(West Germany) C Porwik | **7** | 0 | 2
(South Africa) A Coetzer | **6** | 4 | 2
(Czechoslovakia) **R Rajchrtová** | 2 | **6** | **6**
(West Germany) **I Cueto** | **7** | **6**
(West Germany) W Probst | 5 | 4
(Italy) L Lapi | **7** | 4 | 0
4 | (Bulgaria) **K Maleeva** | 5 | **6** | **6**

Third round
5 | (United States) M J Fernández | 3 | 4
(Czechoslovakia) **R Rajchrtová** | **6** | **6**
(West Germany) **I Cueto** | **6** | **6**
4 | (Bulgaria) K Maleeva | 3 | 3

Quarterfinals
(Czechoslovakia) R Rajchrtová | **6** | 6 | 2
(West Germany) **I Cueto** | 3 | **7** | **6**

==== Section 4 ====
First round
Q | (Sweden) **C Dahlman** | **6** | 2 | **6**
(Argentina) M Paz | 3 | **6** | 4
(Italy) **L Garrone** | **6** | **6**
Q | (United Kingdom) C Wood | 2 | 1
(West Germany) S Gerke | **6** | 4 | 1
11 | (Argentina) **B Fulco** | 4 | **6** | **6**
9 | (Czechoslovakia) **R Zrubáková** | **6** | **6**
(United States) B Bowes | 1 | 1
(Sweden) M Strandlund | **6** | 4 | 1
Q | (West Germany) **S Menning** | 2 | **6** | **6**
Q | (Austria) **P Ritter** | **6** | **6**
Q | (Argentina) G Mosca | 2 | 2

Second round
8 | (West Germany) **S Hanika** | **6** | 4 | **6**
Q | (Sweden) C Dahlman | 2 | **6** | 2
(Italy) **L Garrone** | **6** | 0 | **6**
11 | (Argentina) B Fulco | 2 | **6** | 2
9 | (Czechoslovakia) **R Zrubáková** | **6** | **7**
Q | (West Germany) S Menning | 2 | 5
Q | (Austria) P Ritter | 4 | 2
2 | (Argentina) **G Sabatini** | **6** | **6**

Third round
8 | (West Germany) **S Hanika** | **6** | **6**
(Italy) L Garrone | 1 | 0
9 | (Czechoslovakia) R Zrubáková | **6** | 4 | 2
2 | (Argentina) **G Sabatini** | 3 | **6** | **6**

Quarterfinals
8 | (West Germany) S Hanika | 2 | 0
2 | (Argentina) **G Sabatini** | **6** | **6**
