= 1983 WTA German Open =

- Date: 16 – 22 May
- Edition: 72nd
- Draw: 56S / 29D
- Prize money: $150,000
- Surface: Clay / outdoor
- Location: West Berlin, West Germany
- Venue: Rot-Weiss Tennis Club
- Attendance: 27,100

Champions

Singles
- (United States) Chris Evert-Lloyd

Doubles
- (United Kingdom) Jo Durie / (United Kingdom) Anne Hobbs
- WTA German Open

The 1983 WTA German Open, also known by its sponsored name Fila German Open, was a women's tennis tournament played on outdoor clay courts at the Rot-Weiss Tennis Club in West Berlin in West Germany that was part of the 1983 Virginia Slims World Championship Series. The tournament was held from 16 May through 22 May 1983. First-seeded Chris Evert-Lloyd won the singles title and earned $27,500 first-prize money.

== Finals ==
=== Singles ===
(United States) Chris Evert-Lloyd defeated (United States) Kathleen Horvath 6–4, 7–6^{(7–1)}

- It was Evert-Lloyd's 3rd singles title of the year and the 123rd of her career.

=== Doubles ===
(United Kingdom) Jo Durie / (United Kingdom) Anne Hobbs defeated (West Germany) Claudia Kohde-Kilsch / (West Germany) Eva Pfaff 6–4, 7–6^{(7–2)}

- It was Durie's 2nd title of the year and the 3rd of her career. It was Hobbs' 2nd title of the year and the 3rd of her career.

== Prize money ==
Event	W	F	SF	QF	Round of 16	Round of 32	Round of 64
Singles	$27,500	$14,000	$7,150	$3,300	$1,600	$800	$400
