= 1981 WTA German Open =

- Date: 18–24 May
- Edition: 70th
- Category: Category 3
- Draw: 56S / 28D
- Prize money: $100,000
- Surface: Clay / outdoor
- Location: West Berlin, West Germany
- Venue: Rot-Weiss Tennis Club
- Attendance: 6,000

Champions

Singles
- (Czechoslovakia) Regina Maršíková

Doubles
- (South Africa) Rosalyn Fairbank / (South Africa) Tanya Harford
- WTA German Open

The 1981 WTA German Open was a women's tennis tournament played on outdoor clay courts at the Rot-Weiss Tennis Club in West Berlin in West Germany that was part of the Toyota Series Category 3 tier of the 1981 WTA Tour. It was the 70th edition of the tournament and was held from 18 May through 24 May 1981. Eighth-seeded Regina Maršíková won the singles title and earned $20,000 first-prize money.

== Finals ==
=== Singles ===
(Czechoslovakia) Regina Maršíková defeated (Argentina) Ivanna Madruga 6–2, 6–1

- It was Maršíková's only singles title of the year and the 11th and last of her career.

=== Doubles ===
(South Africa) Rosalyn Fairbank / (South Africa) Tanya Harford defeated (United Kingdom) Sue Barker / (Czechoslovakia) Renáta Tomanová 6–3, 6–4

== Prize money ==
Event	W	F	SF	QF	Round of 16	Round of 32	Round of 64
Singles	$20,000	$10,000	$4,800	$2,050	$1,000	$550	$250
