= 1988 WTA German Open =

- Date: 9–15 May
- Edition: 77th
- Category: Tier I
- Draw: 56S / 28D
- Prize money: $300,000
- Surface: Clay / outdoor
- Location: West Berlin, West Germany
- Venue: Rot-Weiss Tennis Club

Champions

Singles
- (West Germany) Steffi Graf

Doubles
- (France) Isabelle Demongeot (France) Nathalie Tauziat
- WTA German Open

The 1988 WTA German Open was a women's tennis tournament played on outdoor clay courts at the Rot-Weiss Tennis Club in West Berlin, West Germany that was part of Tier I of the 1988 WTA Tour. It was the 77th edition of the tournament and was held from 9 May through 15 May 1988. First-seeded Steffi Graf won her third consecutive singles title at the event.

== Finals ==
=== Singles ===
(West Germany) Steffi Graf defeated (Czechoslovakia) Helena Suková 6–3, 6–2

- It was Graf's 4th singles title of the year and the 23rd of her career.

=== Doubles ===
(France) Isabelle Demongeot / (France) Nathalie Tauziat defeated (West Germany) Claudia Kohde-Kilsch / (Czechoslovakia) Helena Suková 6–2, 4–6, 6–4

- It was Demongeot's 1st title of the year and the 2nd of her career. It was Tauziat's 1st title of the year and the 2nd of her career.
