= 1979 WTA German Open =

- Date: 21–27 May
- Edition: 69th
- Category: Colgate Series (AAA)
- Draw: 32S / 16D
- Prize money: $100,000
- Surface: Clay / outdoor
- Location: West Berlin, West Germany
- Venue: Rot-Weiss Tennis Club

Champions

Singles
- (United States) Caroline Stoll

Doubles
- (United States) Rosie Casals / (Australia) Wendy Turnbull
- WTA German Open

The 1979 WTA German Open was a women's tennis tournament played on outdoor clay courts at the Rot-Weiss Tennis Club in West Berlin, West Germany that was part of the 1979 Colgate Series and was held from 21 May through 27 May 1979. It was the 69th edition of the tournament and the first women's only edition. (Note: From the first edition of the tournament in which the women participated (1896) until the women's only 1979 WTA German Open in Berlin the women's events were played together with the men at the German Championships in Hamburg.) Caroline Stoll won the singles title and earned $20,000 first-prize money.

== Finals ==
=== Singles ===
(United States) Caroline Stoll defeated (Czechoslovakia) Regina Maršíková 7–6^{(7–4)}, 6–0

=== Doubles ===
(United States) Rosie Casals / (Australia) Wendy Turnbull defeated (Australia) Evonne Goolagong / (Australia) Kerry Reid 6–2, 7–5

== Prize money ==
| Event | W | F | SF | QF | Round of 16 | Round of 32 |
| Singles | $20,000 | $10,000 | $5,400 | $2,300 | $1,200 | $600 |
