= 1977 German Open (tennis) =

- Date: 9–15 May
- Edition: 67th
- Category: Grand Prix circuit (Four star)
- Draw: 64S / 32D
- Prize money: $125,000 (men) $35,000 (women)
- Surface: Clay / outdoor
- Location: Hamburg, West Germany
- Venue: Am Rothenbaum

Champions

Men's singles
- (Italy) Paolo Bertolucci

Women's singles
- (United States) Laura duPont

Men's doubles
- (South Africa) Bob Hewitt / (West Germany) Karl Meiler

Women's doubles
- (South Africa) Linky Boshoff / (South Africa) Ilana Kloss
- German Open

The 1977 Grand Prix German Open was a combined men's and women's tennis tournament played on outdoor red clay courts. It was the 67th edition of the event and was part of the 1977 Colgate-Palmolive Grand Prix circuit and categorized as a four-star event. It took place at the Am Rothenbaum in Hamburg, West Germany, from 9 May through 15 May 1977. Paolo Bertolucci, after a victory in the final over title-holder Manuel Orantes, and Laura duPont won the singles titles .

== Finals ==
=== Men's singles ===
(Italy) Paolo Bertolucci defeated (Spain) Manuel Orantes 6–3, 4–6, 6–2, 6–3

=== Women's singles ===
(United States) Laura duPont defeated (West Germany) Heidi Eisterlehner 6–1, 6–4

=== Men's doubles ===
(South Africa) 'Bob Hewitt / (West Germany) Karl Meiler defeated (Australia) Phil Dent / (Australia) Kim Warwick 3–6, 6–3, 6–4, 6–4

=== Women's doubles ===
(South Africa) Linky Boshoff / (South Africa) Ilana Kloss defeated (Czechoslovakia) Regina Maršíková / (Czechoslovakia) Renáta Tomanová 2–6, 6–4, 7–5
