= 1985 Fila German Open =

- Date: 13–19 May
- Edition: 74th
- Category: Category 3
- Draw: 56S / 32D
- Prize money: $150,000
- Surface: Clay / outdoor
- Location: West Berlin, West Germany
- Venue: Rot-Weiss Tennis Club

Champions

Singles
- (United States) Chris Evert-Lloyd

Doubles
- (West Germany) Claudia Kohde-Kilsch (Czechoslovakia) Helena Suková
- WTA German Open

The 1985 Fila German Open was a women's tennis tournament played on outdoor clay courts at the Rot-Weiss Tennis Club in West Berlin, West Germany that was part of the Category 3 tier of the 1985 Virginia Slims World Championship Series. It was the 74th edition of the tournament and was held from 13 May through 19 May 1985. First-seeded Chris Evert-Lloyd won the singles title.

== Finals ==
=== Singles ===
(United States) Chris Evert-Lloyd defeated (West Germany) Steffi Graf 6–4, 7–5

- It was Evert-Lloyd's 3rd title of the year and the 9th of her career.

=== Doubles ===
(West Germany) Claudia Kohde-Kilsch / (Czechoslovakia) Helena Suková defeated (West Germany) Steffi Graf / (France) Catherine Tanvier 6–4, 6–1
