= 1989 Lufthansa Cup =

- Date: 15–21 May
- Edition: 78th
- Category: Category 5
- Draw: 56S / 28D
- Prize money: $300,000
- Surface: Clay / outdoor
- Location: West Berlin, West Germany
- Venue: Rot-Weiss Tennis Club

Champions

Singles
- (West Germany) Steffi Graf

Doubles
- (Australia) Elizabeth Smylie / (Australia) Janine Tremelling
- WTA German Open

The 1989 Lufthansa Cup, also known as the German Open Championships, was a women's tennis tournament played on outdoor clay courts at the Rot-Weiss Tennis Club in West Berlin, West Germany that was part of the Category 5 tier of the 1989 WTA Tour. It was the 78th edition of the tournament and was held from 15 May until 21 May 1989. First-seeded Steffi Graf won the singles title.

== Finals ==
=== Singles ===
(West Germany) Steffi Graf defeated (Argentina) Gabriela Sabatini 6–3, 6–1

- It was Graf's 7th singles title of the year and the 37th of her career.

=== Doubles ===
(Australia) Elizabeth Smylie / (Australia) Janine Tremelling defeated (South Africa) Lise Gregory / (United States) Gretchen Magers 5–7, 6–3, 6–2

- It was Smylie's 5th title of the year and the 26th of her career. It was Tremelling's 3rd title of the year and the 5th of her career.
