= 1971 Grand Prix German Open =

- Date: 17–23 May
- Edition: 61st
- Category: Grand Prix circuit (B Class)
- Draw: 64S / 16D
- Surface: Clay / outdoor
- Location: Hamburg, West Germany
- Venue: Am Rothenbaum

Champions

Men's singles
- (Spain) Andrés Gimeno

Women's singles
- (United States) Billie Jean King

Men's doubles
- (Australia) John Alexander / (Spain) Andrés Gimeno

Women's doubles
- (United States) Rosie Casals / (United States) Billie Jean King

Mixed doubles
- (West Germany) Heide Orth / (West Germany) Jürgen Fassbender
- Grand Prix German Open

The 1971 Grand Prix German Open was a combined men's and women's tennis tournament played on outdoor red clay courts. It was the 61st edition of the tournament. The event was part of the 1971 Pepsi-Cola Grand Prix circuit and categorized as a B Class tournament. It took place at the Am Rothenbaum in Hamburg, West Germany, from 17 May through 23 May 1971. Andrés Gimeno and Billie Jean King won the singles titles.

== Finals ==
=== Men's singles ===
(Spain) Andrés Gimeno defeated (Hungary) Péter Szőke 6–3, 6–2, 6–2

=== Women's singles ===
(United States) Billie Jean King defeated (West Germany) Helga Masthoff 6–3, 6–2

=== Men's doubles ===
(Australia) John Alexander / (Spain) Andrés Gimeno defeated (Australia) Dick Crealy / (Australia) Allan Stone 6–4, 7–5, 7–9, 6–4

=== Women's doubles ===
(United States) Rosie Casals / (United States) Billie Jean King defeated (West Germany) Helga Masthoff / (West Germany) Heide Orth 6–2, 6–1

=== Mixed doubles ===
(West Germany) Heide Orth / (West Germany) Jürgen Fassbender defeated (West Germany) Helga Hösl / (West Germany) Harald Elschenbroich 6–4, 3–6, 6–2
