= 1989 Lufthansa Cup – Doubles =

Doubles
- 1989 Lufthansa Cup
- 1988 Champions: (France) Isabelle Demongeot; (France) Nathalie Tauziat

Final
- Champions: (Australia) Elizabeth Smylie; (Australia) Janine Tremelling
- Runners-up: (South Africa) Lise Gregory; (United States) Gretchen Magers
- Score: 5–7, 6–3, 6–2

Details
- Draw: 28
- Seeds: 8

Events
Singles	Doubles
← 1988 ·	Lufthansa Cup	· 1990 →

Isabelle Demongeot and Nathalie Tauziat were the defending champions but lost in the quarterfinals to Lise Gregory and Gretchen Magers.

Elizabeth Smylie and Janine Tremelling won in the final 5–7, 6–3, 6–2 against Gregory and Magers.

== Seeds ==
Champion seeds are indicated in bold text while text in italics indicates the round in which those seeds were eliminated. The top four seeded teams received byes into the second round.

1. (West Germany) Steffi Graf / (Argentina) Gabriela Sabatini (quarterfinals)
2. (France) Isabelle Demongeot / (France) Nathalie Tauziat (quarterfinals)
3. (Australia) **Elizabeth Smylie** / (Australia) **Janine Tremelling (champions)**
4. (Argentina) Mercedes Paz / (Denmark) Tine Scheuer-Larsen (second round)
5. (Australia) Nicole Provis / (South Africa) Elna Reinach (quarterfinals)
6. (France) Nathalie Herreman / (South Africa) Dianne Van Rensburg (semifinals)
7. (South Africa) Lise Gregory / (United States) Gretchen Magers (final)
8. (Netherlands) Brenda Schultz / (Hungary) Andrea Temesvári (semifinals)

== Draw ==
=== Key ===
- Q = Qualifier
- WC = Wild card
- LL = Lucky loser
- Alt = Alternate
- SE = Special exempt
- PR = Protected ranking
- ITF = ITF entry
- JE = Junior exempt
- w/o = Walkover
- r = Retired
- d = Defaulted
- SR = Special ranking

=== Final ===
Final

3
- (Australia) **Elizabeth Smylie**
- (Australia) **Janine Tremelling**
5
**6**
**6**

7
- (South Africa) Lise Gregory
- (United States) Gretchen Magers
**7**
3
2

=== Top half ===
First round

Second round

Quarterfinals

Semifinals

1
- (West Germany) **S Graf**
- (Argentina) **G Sabatini**
**7**
**6**

- (West Germany) V Martinek
- (Argentina) C Tessi
6
**6**
3

- (Sweden) C Dahlman
- (West Germany) W Probst
6
0

- (Sweden) **C Dahlman**
- (West Germany) **W Probst**
**7**
1
**6**

1
- (West Germany) S Graf
- (Argentina) G Sabatini

- (United States) **A Grossman**
- (Australia) **K Radford**
5
**6**
**6**

8
- (Netherlands) **B Schultz**
- (Hungary) **A Temesvári**
**w/o**

- (Brazil) L Corsato-Owsianka
- (Brazil) N Dias
**7**
4
3

- (United States) A Grossman
- (Australia) K Radford
4
1

- (Australia) L Field
- (West Germany) C Porwik
5
2

8
- (Netherlands) **B Schultz**
- (Hungary) **A Temesvári**
**6**
**6**

8
- (Netherlands) **B Schultz**
- (Hungary) **A Temesvári**
**7**
**6**

8
- (Netherlands) B Schultz
- (Hungary) A Temesvári
3
2

3
- (Australia) **E Smylie**
- (Australia) **J Tremelling**
**6**
**6**

3
- (Australia) **E Smylie**
- (Australia) **J Tremelling**
**7**
**6**

- (Austria) **B Paulus**
- (Czechoslovakia) **R Zrubáková**
**6**
**7**

- (Austria) B Paulus
- (Czechoslovakia) R Zrubáková
5
2

- (Italy) S Cecchini
- (Argentina) P Tarabini
3
6

3
- (Australia) **E Smylie**
- (Australia) **J Tremelling**
**6**
**6**

- (Czechoslovakia) **I Budařová**
- (Czechoslovakia) **R Rajchrtová**
**6**
**7**

5
- (Australia) N Provis
- (South Africa) E Reinach
3
4

- (Switzerland) C Cohen
- (Argentina) G Mosca
3
6

- (Czechoslovakia) I Budařová
- (Czechoslovakia) R Rajchrtová
3
0

- (West Germany) K Düll
- (West Germany) C Schneider
2
4

5
- (Australia) **N Provis**
- (South Africa) **E Reinach**
**6**
**6**

5
- (Australia) **N Provis**
- (South Africa) **E Reinach**
**6**
**6**

=== Bottom half ===
First round

Second round

Quarterfinals

Semifinals

6
- (France) **N Herreman**
- (South Africa) **D Van Rensburg**
5
**6**
**7**

- (United States) J Smoller
- (Sweden) M Strandlund
**7**
2
6

6
- (France) **N Herreman**
- (South Africa) **D Van Rensburg**
**6**
**6**

- (Italy) L Garrone
- (West Germany) S Meier
5
1

- (Argentina) B Fulco
- (Argentina) A Villagrán
3
4

- (Argentina) **B Fulco**
- (Argentina) **A Villagrán**
**7**
**6**

6
- (France) **N Herreman**
- (South Africa) **D Van Rensburg**
**7**
**6**

- (Australia) J-A Faull
- (Australia) R McQuillan

- (Canada) H Kelesi
- (United States) T Phelps
6
3

- (Canada) **H Kelesi**
- (United States) **T Phelps**
**w/o**

- (Canada) **H Kelesi**
- (United States) **T Phelps**
**6**
6
**7**

4
- (Argentina) M Paz
- (Denmark) T Scheuer-Larsen
4
**7**
5

6
- (France) N Herreman
- (South Africa) D Van Rensburg
2
3

7
- (South Africa) **L Gregory**
- (United States) **G Magers**
**7**
2
**6**

7
- (South Africa) **L Gregory**
- (United States) **G Magers**
**6**
**6**

- (West Germany) S Menning
- (Austria) P Ritter
6
**6**
3

7
- (South Africa) **L Gregory**
- (United States) **G Magers**
**6**
**6**

- (Australia) **T Morton**
- (Australia) **L O'Neill**
**6**
**6**

- (Australia) T Morton
- (Australia) L O'Neill
3
1

- (South Africa) A Coetzer
- (Austria) H Sprung
4
4

7
- (South Africa) **L Gregory**
- (United States) **G Magers**
4
**6**
**7**

- (Hong Kong) **P Hy**
- (United Kingdom) **C Wood**
**w/o**

2
- (France) I Demongeot
- (France) N Tauziat
**6**
2
5

- (Poland) I Kuczyńska
- (Czechoslovakia) J Pospíšilová

- (Hong Kong) P Hy
- (United Kingdom) C Wood
2
3

2
- (France) **I Demongeot**
- (France) **N Tauziat**
**6**
**6**
