= 1988 WTA German Open – Doubles =

Doubles
- 1988 WTA German Open
- 1987 Champions: (West Germany) Claudia Kohde-Kilsch; (Czechoslovakia) Helena Suková

Final
- Champions: (France) Isabelle Demongeot; (France) Nathalie Tauziat
- Runners-up: (West Germany) Claudia Kohde-Kilsch; (Czechoslovakia) Helena Suková
- Score: 6–2, 4–6, 6–4

Details
- Draw: 28
- Seeds: 8

Events
Singles	Doubles
← 1987 ·	WTA German Open	· 1989 →

Claudia Kohde-Kilsch and Helena Suková were the defending champions but lost in the final 6–2, 4–6, 6–4 against Isabelle Demongeot and Nathalie Tauziat.

== Seeds ==
Champion seeds are indicated in bold text while text in italics indicates the round in which those seeds were eliminated. The top four seeded teams received byes into the second round.

1. (West Germany) Claudia Kohde-Kilsch / (Czechoslovakia) Helena Suková (final)
2. (Australia) Hana Mandlíková / (West Germany) Eva Pfaff (second round)
3. (Czechoslovakia) Jana Novotná / (Argentina) Mercedes Paz (quarterfinals)
4. (Netherlands) Manon Bollegraf / (Denmark) Tine Scheuer-Larsen (quarterfinals)
5. (France) **Isabelle Demongeot** / (France) **Nathalie Tauziat (champions)**
6. (Australia) Jenny Byrne / (Australia) Janine Tremelling (quarterfinals)
7. (United States) Kathleen Horvath / (South Africa) Dianne Van Rensburg (semifinals)
8. (United Kingdom) Jo Durie / (Australia) Nicole Provis (semifinals)

== Draw ==
=== Key ===
- Q = Qualifier
- WC = Wild card
- LL = Lucky loser
- Alt = Alternate
- SE = Special exempt
- PR = Protected ranking
- ITF = ITF entry
- JE = Junior exempt
- w/o = Walkover
- r = Retired
- d = Defaulted
- SR = Special ranking

=== Final ===
Final

1
- (West Germany) Claudia Kohde-Kilsch
- (Czechoslovakia) Helena Suková
2
**6**
4

5
- (France) **Isabelle Demongeot**
- (France) **Nathalie Tauziat**
**6**
4
**6**

=== Top half ===
First round

Second round

Quarterfinals

Semifinals

1
- (West Germany) **C Kohde-Kilsch**
- (Czechoslovakia) **H Suková**
**6**
**6**

- (Czechoslovakia) **I Budařová**
- (Australia) **L Field**
**6**
**6**

- (Czechoslovakia) I Budařová
- (Australia) L Field
1
3

- (United States) L Spadea
- (Brazil) A Vieira
3
2

1
- (West Germany) **C Kohde-Kilsch**
- (Czechoslovakia) **H Suková**
**6**
**6**

- (Argentina) **A Villagrán**
- (Netherlands) **H Witvoet**
**6**
**6**

6
- (Australia) J Byrne
- (Australia) J Tremelling
3
2

- (West Germany) S Meier
- (West Germany) W Probst
4
4

- (Argentina) A Villagrán
- (Netherlands) H Witvoet
5
1

- (West Germany) K Düll
- (West Germany) S Menning
2
3

6
- (Australia) **J Byrne**
- (Australia) **J Tremelling**
**7**
**6**

6
- (Australia) **J Byrne**
- (Australia) **J Tremelling**
**6**
**6**

1
- (West Germany) **C Kohde-Kilsch**
- (Czechoslovakia) **H Suková**
**6**
**6**

8
- (United Kingdom) J Durie
- (Australia) N Provis
2
1

4
- (Netherlands) **M Bollegraf**
- (Denmark) **T Scheuer-Larsen**
**6**
**6**

- (West Germany) **I Cueto**
- (Spain) **A Sánchez**
**6**
**6**

- (West Germany) I Cueto
- (Spain) A Sánchez
2
2

- (West Germany) V Martinek
- (Austria) H Sprung
2
4

4
- (Netherlands) M Bollegraf
- (Denmark) T Scheuer-Larsen
1
**7**
4

- (West Germany) **A Betzner**
- (West Germany) **C Porwik**
**6**
**6**

8
- (United Kingdom) **J Durie**
- (Australia) **N Provis**
**6**
5
**6**

- (United States) J Blackstad
- (Austria) B Paulus
2
1

- (West Germany) A Betzner
- (West Germany) C Porwik
4
6

- (Brazil) L Corsato
- (Brazil) G Faria
5
5

8
- (United Kingdom) **J Durie**
- (Australia) **N Provis**
**6**
**7**

8
- (United Kingdom) **J Durie**
- (Australia) **N Provis**
**7**
**7**

=== Bottom half ===
First round

Second round

Quarterfinals

Semifinals

7
- (United States) **K Horvath**
- (South Africa) **D Van Rensburg**
**6**
**6**

- (Argentina) B Fulco
- (United States) E Raponi-Longo
2
4

7
- (United States) **K Horvath**
- (South Africa) **D Van Rensburg**
**6**
4
**6**

- (United States) B Bowes
- (United States) J Smoller
2
3

- (France) J Halard
- (France) P Paradis
3
**6**
2

- (France) **J Halard**
- (France) **P Paradis**
**6**
**6**

7
- (United States) **K Horvath**
- (South Africa) **D Van Rensburg**
**6**
2
**6**

(Italy) **S Cecchini**
(Socialist Federal Republic of Yugoslavia) **S Goleš**
0
**6**
**6**

3
- (Czechoslovakia) J Novotná
- (Argentina) M Paz
3
**6**
3

- (Netherlands) C Bakkum
- (Netherlands) B Schultz
**6**
1
2

(Italy) S Cecchini
(Socialist Federal Republic of Yugoslavia) S Goleš
6
4

3
- (Czechoslovakia) **J Novotná**
- (Argentina) **M Paz**
**7**
**6**

7
- (United States) K Horvath
- (South Africa) D Van Rensburg
4
3

5
- (France) **I Demongeot**
- (France) **N Tauziat**
**6**
4
**6**

5
- (France) **I Demongeot**
- (France) **N Tauziat**
**6**
**6**

- (Brazil) N Dias
- (Argentina) P Tarabini
0
**6**
3

5
- (France) **I Demongeot**
- (France) **N Tauziat**
**6**
**6**

- (Italy) **L Ferrando**
- (Italy) **L Garrone**
6
**6**
**6**

- (Italy) L Ferrando
- (Italy) L Garrone
0
3

- (United States) M Torres
- (United Kingdom) C Wood
**7**
2
4

5
- (France) **I Demongeot**
- (France) **N Tauziat**
4
**6**
**7**

- (Brazil) **G Miró**
- (Argentina) **G Mosca**
**6**
**6**

- (Brazil) G Miró
- (Argentina) G Mosca
**6**
1
6

- (United States) S Norris
- (New Zealand) R Seeman
1
4

- (Brazil) **G Miró**
- (Argentina) **G Mosca**
2
**6**
**7**

2
- (Australia) H Mandlíková
- (West Germany) E Pfaff
**6**
2
6
