= 1972 Grand Prix German Open =

- Date: 5–11 June
- Edition: 62nd
- Category: Grand Prix circuit
- Draw: 64S / 32D
- Surface: Clay / outdoor
- Location: Hamburg, West Germany
- Venue: Am Rothenbaum

Champions

Men's singles
- (Spain) Manuel Orantes

Women's singles
- (West Germany) Helga Masthoff

Men's doubles
- (Czechoslovakia) Jan Kodeš / (Romania) Ilie Năstase

Women's doubles
- (West Germany) Helga Masthoff / (West Germany) Heide Orth

Mixed doubles
- (West Germany) Heide Orth / (West Germany) Jürgen Fassbender
- Grand Prix German Open

The 1972 Grand Prix German Open was a combined men's and women's tennis tournament played on outdoor red clay courts. It was the 62nd edition of the event and was part of the 1972 Commercial Union Assurance Grand Prix circuit. It took place at the Am Rothenbaum in Hamburg, West Germany, from 5 June through 11 June 1972. Manuel Orantes and Helga Masthoff won the singles titles.

== Finals ==
=== Men's singles ===
(Spain) Manuel Orantes defeated (Italy) Adriano Panatta 6–3, 9–8, 6–0

=== Women's singles ===
(West Germany) Helga Masthoff defeated (United States) Linda Tuero 6–3, 3–6, 8–6

=== Men's doubles ===
(Czechoslovakia) Jan Kodeš / (Romania) Ilie Năstase defeated (South Africa) Bob Hewitt / (Romania) Ion Țiriac 4–6, 6–0, 3–6, 6–2, 6–2

=== Women's doubles ===
(West Germany) Helga Masthoff / (West Germany) Heide Orth defeated (United States) Wendy Overton / (United States) Valerie Ziegenfuss 6–3, 2–6, 6–0

=== Mixed doubles ===
(West Germany) Helga Masthoff / (West Germany) Jürgen Fassbender defeated (West Germany) Helga Masthoff / (West Germany) Hans-Jürgen Pohmann 6–4, 6–2
