= 1986 WTA German Open =

- Date: 12–19 May
- Edition: 75th
- Category: World Championship Series
- Draw: 56S / 30D
- Prize money: $150,000
- Surface: Clay / outdoor
- Location: West Berlin, West Germany
- Venue: Rot-Weiss Tennis Club

Champions

Singles
- (West Germany) Steffi Graf

Doubles
- (West Germany) Steffi Graf (Czechoslovakia) Helena Suková
- WTA German Open

The 1986 WTA German Open was a women's tennis tournament played on outdoor clay courts at the Rot-Weiss Tennis Club in West Berlin, West Germany that was part of the 1986 Virginia Slims World Championship Series. It was the 75th edition of the tournament and was held from 12 May through 18 May 1986. Second-seeded Steffi Graf won the singles title and earned $29,000 first-prize money. The tournament marked the first time that Graf defeated Martina Navratilova.

== Finals ==
=== Singles ===
(West Germany) Steffi Graf defeated (United States) Martina Navratilova 6–2, 6–3

- It was Graf's 4th singles title of the year and of her career.

=== Doubles ===
(West Germany) Steffi Graf / (Czechoslovakia) Helena Suková defeated (Czechoslovakia) Martina Navratilova / (Hungary) Andrea Temesvári 7–5, 6–2
