= 1976 German Open (tennis) =

1976 Grand Prix German Open
- Date: 17–23 May
- Edition: 66th
- Category: Grand Prix circuit
- Draw: 64S / 32D
- Prize money: $100,000
- Surface: Clay / outdoor
- Location: Hamburg, West Germany
- Venue: Am Rothenbaum

Champions

Men's singles
- (United States) Eddie Dibbs

Women's singles
- (United Kingdom) Sue Barker

Men's doubles
- (United States) Fred McNair / (United States) Sherwood Stewart

Women's doubles
- (South Africa) Linky Boshoff / (South Africa) Ilana Kloss
- Grand Prix German Open

The 1976 Grand Prix German Open, also known by its sponsored name Holsten-Bier German Open. was a combined men's and women's tennis tournament played on outdoor red clay courts. It was the 66th edition of the event and was part of the 1976 Commercial Union Assurance Grand Prix circuit. It took place at the Am Rothenbaum in Hamburg, West Germany, from 17 May through 23 May 1976. Eddie Dibbs and Sue Barker won the singles titles.

== Finals ==
=== Men's singles ===
(United States) Eddie Dibbs defeated (Spain) Manuel Orantes 6–4, 4–6, 6–1, 2–6, 6–1

=== Women's singles ===
(United Kingdom) Sue Barker defeated (Czechoslovakia) Renáta Tomanová 6–3, 6–1

=== Men's doubles ===
(United States) Fred McNair/ (United States) Sherwood Stewart defeated (Australia) Dick Crealy / (Australia) Kim Warwick 7–6, 7–6, 7–6

=== Women's doubles ===
(South Africa) Linky Boshoff / (South Africa) Ilana Kloss defeated (United States) Laura DuPont / (Australia) Wendy Turnbull 4–6, 7–5, 6–1
