= 1968 German Open Championships =

- Date: 5–13 August
- Edition: 58th
- Draw: 64S / 32D
- Surface: Clay / outdoor
- Location: Hamburg, West Germany
- Venue: Am Rothenbaum

Champions

Men's singles
- (Australia) John Newcombe

Women's singles
- (South Africa) Annette Du Plooy

Men's doubles
- (Netherlands) Tom Okker / (United States) Marty Riessen

Women's doubles
- (South Africa) Annette Du Plooy / (South Africa) Pat Walkden

Mixed doubles
- (South Africa) Annette Du Plooy / (South Africa) Frew McMillan
- German Open Tennis Championships

The 1968 German Open Championships was a combined men's and women's tennis tournament played on outdoor red clay courts. It was the 60th edition of the tournament, the first one in the Open Era, and took place at the Am Rothenbaum in Hamburg, West Germany, from 5 August through 13 August 1968. John Newcombe and Annette Du Plooy won the singles titles.

== Finals ==
=== Men's singles ===
(Australia) John Newcombe defeated (South Africa) Cliff Drysdale 6–3, 6–2, 6–4

=== Women's singles ===
(South Africa) Annette Du Plooy defeated (Australia) Judy Tegart 6–1, 7–6

=== Men's doubles ===
(Netherlands) Tom Okker / (United States) Marty Riessen defeated (Australia) John Newcombe / (Australia) Tony Roche 6–4, 6–4, 7–5

=== Women's doubles ===
(South Africa) Annette Du Plooy / (South Africa) Pat Walkden defeated (United Kingdom) Winnie Shaw / (Australia) Judy Tegart 6–3, 7–5

=== Mixed doubles ===
(South Africa) Annette Du Plooy / (South Africa) Frew McMillan defeated (South Africa) Pat Walkden / (Australia) Anderson 6–1, 12–10
