= 1988 WTA German Open – Singles =

Singles
- 1988 WTA German Open
- 1987 Champion: (West Germany) Steffi Graf

Final
- Champion: (West Germany) Steffi Graf
- Runner-up: (Czechoslovakia) Helena Suková
- Score: 6–3, 6–2

Details
- Draw: 56
- Seeds: 16

Events
Singles	Doubles
← 1987 ·	WTA German Open	· 1989 →

Steffi Graf was the defending champion and won in the final 6–3, 6–2 against Helena Suková.

== Seeds ==
A champion seed is indicated in bold text while text in italics indicates the round in which that seed was eliminated. The top eight seeds received a bye to the second round.

1. (West Germany) **Steffi Graf (champion)**
2. (Czechoslovakia) Helena Suková (final)
3. (West Germany) Claudia Kohde-Kilsch (semifinals)
4. (Australia) Hana Mandlíková (third round)
5. (Italy) Raffaella Reggi (second round)
6. (Italy) Sandra Cecchini (quarterfinals)
7. (West Germany) Sylvia Hanika (semifinals)
8. (United States) Mary Joe Fernández (quarterfinals)
9. (Spain) Arantxa Sánchez (second round)
10. (France) Nathalie Tauziat (second round)
11. (West Germany) Isabel Cueto (third round)
12. (Argentina) Patricia Tarabini (third round)
13. (Czechoslovakia) Jana Novotná (first round)
14. (United States) Kathleen Horvath (second round)
15. n/a
16. n/a

== Draw ==
=== Key ===
- Q = Qualifier
- WC = Wild card
- LL = Lucky loser
- Alt = Alternate
- SE = Special exempt
- PR = Protected ranking
- ITF = ITF entry
- JE = Junior exempt
- w/o = Walkover
- r = Retired
- d = Defaulted
- SR = Special ranking

=== Finals ===
Semifinals
1	(West Germany) **Steffi Graf**	**6**	**6**
3	(West Germany) Claudia Kohde-Kilsch	1	0
7	(West Germany) Sylvia Hanika	2	3
2	(Czechoslovakia) **Helena Suková**	**6**	**6**

Final
1	(West Germany) **Steffi Graf**	**6**	**6**
2	(Czechoslovakia) Helena Suková	3	2

=== Top half ===
==== Section 1 ====
First round
(France) **J Halard**	**7**	**6**
(United Kingdom) J Durie	6	1
(West Germany) **S Meier**	**6**	**6**
(Australia) J Byrne	2	3
Q	(Sweden) C Dahlman	4	**6**	1
10	(France) **N Tauziat**	**6**	1	**6**
(South Africa) **D Van Rensburg**	**7**	**6**
(Italy) L Ferrando	5	2
LL	(Australia) L Field	6	2
(Australia) **N Provis**	**7**	**6**
(Netherlands) M Bollegraf	5	1
(France) **I Demongeot**	**7**	**6**

Second round
1	(West Germany) **S Graf**	**6**	**6**
(France) J Halard	0	1
(West Germany) **S Meier**	**7**	**6**
10	(France) N Tauziat	5	2
(South Africa) D Van Rensburg	4	3
(Australia) **N Provis**	**6**	**6**
(France) **I Demongeot**	**6**	**6**
5	(Italy) R Reggi	0	1

Third round
1	(West Germany) **S Graf**	**6**	**6**
(West Germany) S Meier	2	1
(Australia) **N Provis**	**6**	3	**6**
(France) I Demongeot	2	**6**	2

Quarterfinals
1	(West Germany) **S Graf**	**6**	**6**
(Australia) N Provis	0	2

==== Section 2 ====
First round
Q	(West Germany) **H Thoms**	**7**	**6**
(Italy) F Bonsignori	6	2
Q	(Brazil) A Vieira	3	4
(Argentina) **M Paz**	**6**	**6**
Q	(Italy) **L Lapi**	**7**	6	**6**
13	(Czechoslovakia) J Novotná	6	**7**	2
12	(Argentina) **P Tarabini**	**6**	**6**
(Brazil) G Miró	2	2
(Czechoslovakia) I Budařová	**7**	6	3
Q	(United Kingdom) **C Wood**	6	**7**	**6**
Q	(West Germany) S Menning	1	0
Q	(Denmark) **T Scheuer-Larsen**	**6**	**6**

Second round
3	(West Germany) **C Kohde-Kilsch**	**6**	**7**
Q	(West Germany) H Thoms	2	5
(Argentina) **M Paz**	**6**	**7**
Q	(Italy) L Lapi	0	6
12	(Argentina) **P Tarabini**	**6**	5	**7**
Q	(United Kingdom) C Wood	3	**7**	6
Q	(Denmark) T Scheuer-Larsen	**6**	5	1
6	(Italy) **S Cecchini**	2	**7**	**6**

Third round
3	(West Germany) **C Kohde-Kilsch**	**6**	**6**
(Argentina) M Paz	2	3
12	(Argentina) P Tarabini	1	1
6	(Italy) **S Cecchini**	**6**	**6**

Quarterfinals
3	(West Germany) **C Kohde-Kilsch**	**7**	**6**
6	(Italy) S Cecchini	5	1

=== Bottom half ===
==== Section 3 ====
First round
(West Germany) K Düll	4	4
(Austria) **H Sprung**	**6**	**6**
(France) P Paradis	**6**	3	1
LL	(Switzerland) **C Cohen**	4	**6**	**6**
(Italy) L Garrone	1	4
11	(West Germany) **I Cueto**	**6**	**6**
9	(Spain) **A Sánchez**	**6**	**6**
(West Germany) E Pfaff	1	4
(Czechoslovakia) **R Zrubáková**	**7**	**6**
(Netherlands) H Witvoet	5	3
(West Germany) **V Martinek**	**6**	**6**
(West Germany) S Auer	3	4

Second round
7	(West Germany) **S Hanika**	**6**	**6**
(Austria) H Sprung	2	1
LL	(Switzerland) C Cohen	**6**	2	0
11	(West Germany) **I Cueto**	0	**6**	**6**
9	(Spain) A Sánchez	6	1
(Czechoslovakia) **R Zrubáková**	**7**	**6**
(West Germany) V Martinek	**6**	4	4
4	(Australia) **H Mandlíková**	2	**6**	**6**

Third round
7	(West Germany) **S Hanika**	**6**	**6**
11	(West Germany) I Cueto	2	4
(Czechoslovakia) **R Zrubáková**	**7**	**7**
4	(Australia) H Mandlíková	6	5

Quarterfinals
7	(West Germany) **S Hanika**	**6**	3	**6**
(Czechoslovakia) R Zrubáková	4	**6**	1

==== Section 4 ====
First round
(Austria) P Huber	**6**	4	2
(West Germany) **S Frankl**	1	**6**	**6**
(United States) **B Bowes**	**7**	**6**
(West Germany) C Porwik	6	4
(Argentina) A Villagrán	4	**7**	3
14	(United States) **K Horvath**	**6**	6	**6**
(West Germany) W Probst	2	2
(United States) **M Torres**	**6**	**6**
(Socialist Federal Republic of Yugoslavia) **S Goleš**	**7**	**7**
(Netherlands) B Schultz	6	5
(Austria) B Paulus	1	2
(Argentina) **B Fulco**	**6**	**6**

Second round
8	(United States) **M J Fernández**	**6**	**6**
(West Germany) S Frankl	0	2
(United States) **B Bowes**	**6**	**6**
14	(United States) K Horvath	3	3
(United States) M Torres	0	2
(Socialist Federal Republic of Yugoslavia) **S Goleš**	**6**	**6**
(Argentina) B Fulco	6	1
2	(Czechoslovakia) **H Suková**	**7**	**6**

Third round
8	(United States) **M J Fernández**	**6**	**6**
(United States) B Bowes	3	4
(Socialist Federal Republic of Yugoslavia) S Goleš	4	3
2	(Czechoslovakia) **H Suková**	**6**	**6**

Quarterfinals
8	(United States) M J Fernández	6	0
2	(Czechoslovakia) **H Suková**	**7**	**6**
