= 1969 German Open Championships =

- Date: 5–11 August
- Edition: 59th
- Draw: 64MS / 32WS / 32MD
- Prize money: $17,500
- Surface: Clay / outdoor
- Location: Hamburg, West Germany
- Venue: Am Rothenbaum

Champions

Men's singles
- (Australia) Tony Roche

Women's singles
- (Australia) Judy Tegart

Men's doubles
- (Netherlands) Tom Okker / (United States) Marty Riessen

Women's doubles
- (Australia) Judy Tegart / (West Germany) Helga Niessen

Mixed doubles
- (Australia) Judy Tegart / (United States) Marty Riessen
- German Open Tennis Championships

The 1969 German Open Championships was a combined men's and women's tennis tournament played on outdoor clay courts. It was the 59th edition of the tournament, the second one in the Open Era, and the first edition to offer official prize money. The event took place at the Am Rothenbaum in Hamburg, West Germany, from 5 August through 11 August 1969. First-seeded Tony Roche and Judy Tegart won the singles titles. Tegart also won the doubles (with Helga Niessen) and mixed doubles (with Marty Riessen) titles.

== Finals ==
=== Men's singles ===
(Australia) Tony Roche defeated (Netherlands) Tom Okker 6–1, 5–7, 7–5, 8–6

=== Women's singles ===
(Australia) Judy Tegart defeated (West Germany) Helga Niessen 6–3, 6–4

=== Men's doubles ===
(Netherlands) Tom Okker / (United States) Marty Riessen defeated (France) Jean-Claude Barclay / (West Germany) Jürgen Fassbender 6–1, 6–2, 6–4

=== Women's doubles ===
(Australia) Judy Tegart / (West Germany) Helga Niessen defeated (West Germany) Edda Buding / (West Germany) Helga Hösl Schultze 6–1, 6–4

=== Mixed doubles ===
(Australia) Judy Tegart / (United States) Marty Riessen defeated (South Africa) Pat Walkden / (South Africa) Frew McMillan 6–4, 6–1
