= 1975 Grand Prix German Open =

- Date: 19–25 May
- Edition: 65th
- Category: Grand Prix circuit (AA grade)
- Draw: 64S / 32D
- Prize money: $100,000
- Surface: Clay / outdoor
- Location: Hamburg, West Germany
- Venue: Am Rothenbaum
- Attendance: 38,000

Champions

Men's singles
- (Spain) Manuel Orantes

Women's singles
- (Czechoslovakia) Renáta Tomanová

Men's doubles
- (Spain) Juan Gisbert / (Spain) Manuel Orantes

Women's doubles
- (Australia) Dianne Fromholtz / (Czechoslovakia) Renáta Tomanová
- Grand Prix German Open

The 1975 Grand Prix German Open was a combined men's and women's tennis tournament played on outdoor red clay courts. It was the 65th edition of the event and was part of the 1975 Commercial Union Assurance Grand Prix circuit. It took place at the Am Rothenbaum in Hamburg, West Germany, from 19 May through 25 May 1975. Manuel Orantes and Renáta Tomanová won the singles titles.

== Finals ==
=== Men's singles ===
(Spain) Manuel Orantes defeated (Czechoslovakia) Jan Kodeš 3–6, 6–2, 6–2, 4–6, 6–1

=== Women's singles ===
(Czechoslovakia) Renáta Tomanová defeated (Japan) Kazuko Sawamatsu 7–6, 5–7, 10–8

=== Men's doubles ===
(Spain) Juan Gisbert / (Spain) Manuel Orantes defeated (Poland) Wojciech Fibak / (Czechoslovakia) Jan Kodeš 6–3, 7–6

=== Women's doubles ===
(Australia) Dianne Fromholtz / (Czechoslovakia) Renáta Tomanová defeated (Israel) Paulina Peisachov / (Japan) Kazuko Sawamatsu 6–3, 6–2
