= Heidi Eisterlehner =

German tennis player (1949–2025)

- Country (sports): West Germany
- Born: 25 October 1949 Burg bei Magdeburg, Saxony-Anhalt, East Germany
- Died: 15 May 2025 (aged 75)
- Height: 1.72 m (5 ft 8 in)
- Plays: Right-handed
- Prize money: US$ 58,276

Singles
- Career titles: 0
- Highest ranking: No. 61 (31 December 1980)

Grand Slam singles results
- Australian Open: QF (1976)
- French Open: 3R (1977, 1978)
- Wimbledon: 2R (1976, 1981)
- US Open: 1R (1977)

Doubles
- Career titles: 0

Grand Slam doubles results
- Australian Open: 2R (1976)
- French Open: 2R (1977)
- Wimbledon: 2R (1976, 1980)
- US Open: 2R (1977)

Team competitions
- Fed Cup: QF (1976)

Heidi Eisterlehner (25 October 1949 – 15 May 2025) was a German tennis player who was active from the mid-1970s to the mid-1980s.

== Background ==
Eisterlehner was born in Burg bei Magdeburg, East Germany but moved in her youth to Nuremberg, where she started playing at the local club 1. FC Nürnberg. She studied social pedagogy.

Eisterlehner died on 15 May 2025, at the age of 75.

== Career ==
Eisterlehner's best singles result at a Grand Slam tournament came in 1976 when she reached the quarterfinals at the Australian Open. In the second round, she defeated fourth-seeded Sue Barker.

She won the singles title at the Auckland Open, a non-tour event, in January 1977 after a victory in the final against Karen Krantzcke. In May that year, Eisterlehner reached the singles final at the German Open in Hamburg. Also in 1977, she won the national indoor singles title in Hamburg.

In 1976 and 1978, she participated in five ties as a member of the German Fed Cup team and compiled a 3–2 win–loss record.

== WTA Tour finals ==
=== Singles (0–1) ===
Result	W–L	Date	Tournament	Surface	Opponents	Score
Loss	0–1	May 1977	German Open, Germany	Clay	(United States) Laura duPont	1–6, 4–6

=== Doubles (0–2) ===
Result	W–L	Date	Tournament	Surface	Partner	Opponents	Score
Loss	0–1	Dec 1975	NSW Open, Australia	Grass	(West Germany) Helga Masthoff	(Australia) Evonne Goolagong (Australia) Helen Gourlay	3–6, 6–4, 3–6
Loss	0–2	July 1976	Austrian Open, Austria	Clay	(West Germany) Katja Ebbinghaus	(Sweden) Helena Anliot (Sweden) Mimmi Wikstedt	4–6, 6–2, 5–7
