= German Open =

German Open is a name given to many sports events established in Germany, and include:

- German Open (badminton), an annual badminton tournament held since 1955.
- German Open (golf), was a golf tournament on the European Tour
- German Masters, a snooker tournament formerly known as "German Open"
- German Open (darts), a professional darts tournament
- German Open Tennis Championships or the Hamburg Open, a professional tennis tournament on the ATP Tour and WTA Tour, formerly known as the ATP German Open and German Open International.
- German Open (WTA) or the Berlin Tennis Open, professional tennis tournament on the WTA Tour
- German Open (table tennis), an ITTF table tennis tournament
