= Heide Orth =

German tennis player

- Country (sports): West Germany
- Born: 10 August 1942 (age 82); Grevesmühlen, Germany
- Plays: Right-handed

Singles

Grand Slam singles results
- French Open: 2R (1974)
- Wimbledon: 3R (1968)
- US Open: 3R (1964)

Doubles
- Career titles: 4

Grand Slam doubles results
- French Open: QF (1972, 1974)
- Wimbledon: QF (1968, 1971)

Grand Slam mixed doubles results
- Australian Open: 3R (1965)
- French Open: 3R (1965)
- Wimbledon: 4R (1962)

Heide Orth (née Schildknecht; born 10 August 1942) is a former tennis player from Germany.

Heide grew up in Essen in the industrial Ruhr valley and began playing tennis with her father at the age of 13. Her first major success was winning the West German Junior Championship in 1960. Heide later competed in the International Women's Circuit for many years and played for the Germany National Fed Cup team 15 times between 1964 and 1973. She won the singles title at the German national indoor championships in 1969, 1971, 1972 and 1973. Orth reached the quarterfinals in doubles at both Wimbledon and the French Open. In singles, she had wins on the women's tour against the then-reigning Wimbledon champions Virginia Wade (twice) and Evonne Goolagong.

Heide married Ludwig Orth in 1965 and gave birth to her son in 1970. At that time, she took over ten years to break from tennis before entering the International Tennis Federation (ITF) Senior Circuit.

According to the ITF, Heide Orth is the most successful female player worldwide in the history of Senior Tennis. She won ITF World Championships in Singles (11), in Doubles (13) and in Team (Cup) Competitions (12). She was also successful in winning more than 80 European Championships in Singles and Doubles (indoor and outdoor), as well as numerous Championships of Germany and other countries. During tournaments in the USA, she earned 45 Gold Balls for winning titles as a USA-Champion on clay and grass.

Orth was a fifteen-time European Player of the Year, and she is one of only four tennis players who received the European Senior Lifetime Champion Award.

Heide Orth is the first and only female tennis player worldwide to be honoured by the ITF for Outstanding Achievements in Senior Tennis. This special award was handed over to her at the ITF World Champions Dinner in Paris on 3 June 2014.
