= Rot-Weiss Tennis Club =

Tennis club in Berlin, Germany

Coordinates: 52.484982°N 13.258975°E

Steffi-Graf-Stadion
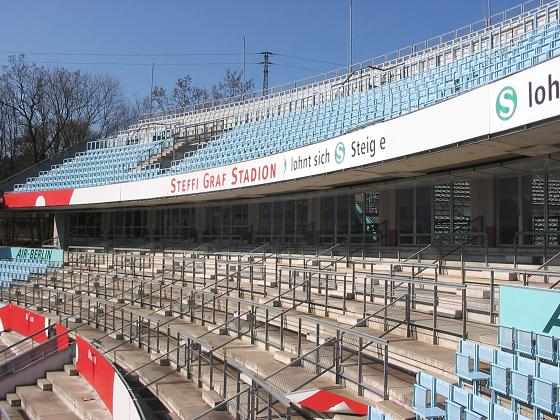
- Location: Rot-Weiss Tennis Club, Grunewald, Berlin, Germany
- Capacity: 7,000
- Surface: Grass, Outdoors

Construction
- Groundbreaking: ?
- Opened: 1996
- Cost: 20 Mio. Deutsche Mark
- Architect: ?

Website
- Rot-Weiss Tennis Club

The Lawn-Tennis-Turnier-Club "Rot-Weiß" (abbr.: LTTC, red-white) is a tennis club located in Grunewald, part of a district in Berlin, Germany. The club was founded in 1897 as Lawn Tennis Turnier Club, and was the origin for careers of many German tennis players in the 20th century like Cilly Aussem, Otto Froitzheim, Henner Henkel, Hans Moldenhauer, Hans-Jürgen Pohmann, Roman Najuch and Daniel Prenn.

The central court has been the venue of the German Pro Championships since 1911 and later the German Open WTA Tour tournament from 1979 until 2008, and again since 2021. The club has 16 clay courts. During winter season there are eight indoor courts available. A larger 7,000-seat stadium court was built in 1996 to replace the old one with 3,500. This stadium was named Steffi-Graf-Stadion in September 2004. For the 2020 season its clay surface was replaced with grass.

Steffi Graf was member of the club since 1984. Also Boris Becker represented the club 1985-1987. The club is located at the Gottfried von Cramm Street, named after the German tennis legend and the man primarily responsible for reviving the Rot-Weiß club after World War II, Baron Gottfried von Cramm.

== See also ==
- List of tennis stadiums by capacity
