= Am Rothenbaum =

Tennis venue in Hamburg, Germany

- Tennisstadion Am Rothenbaum

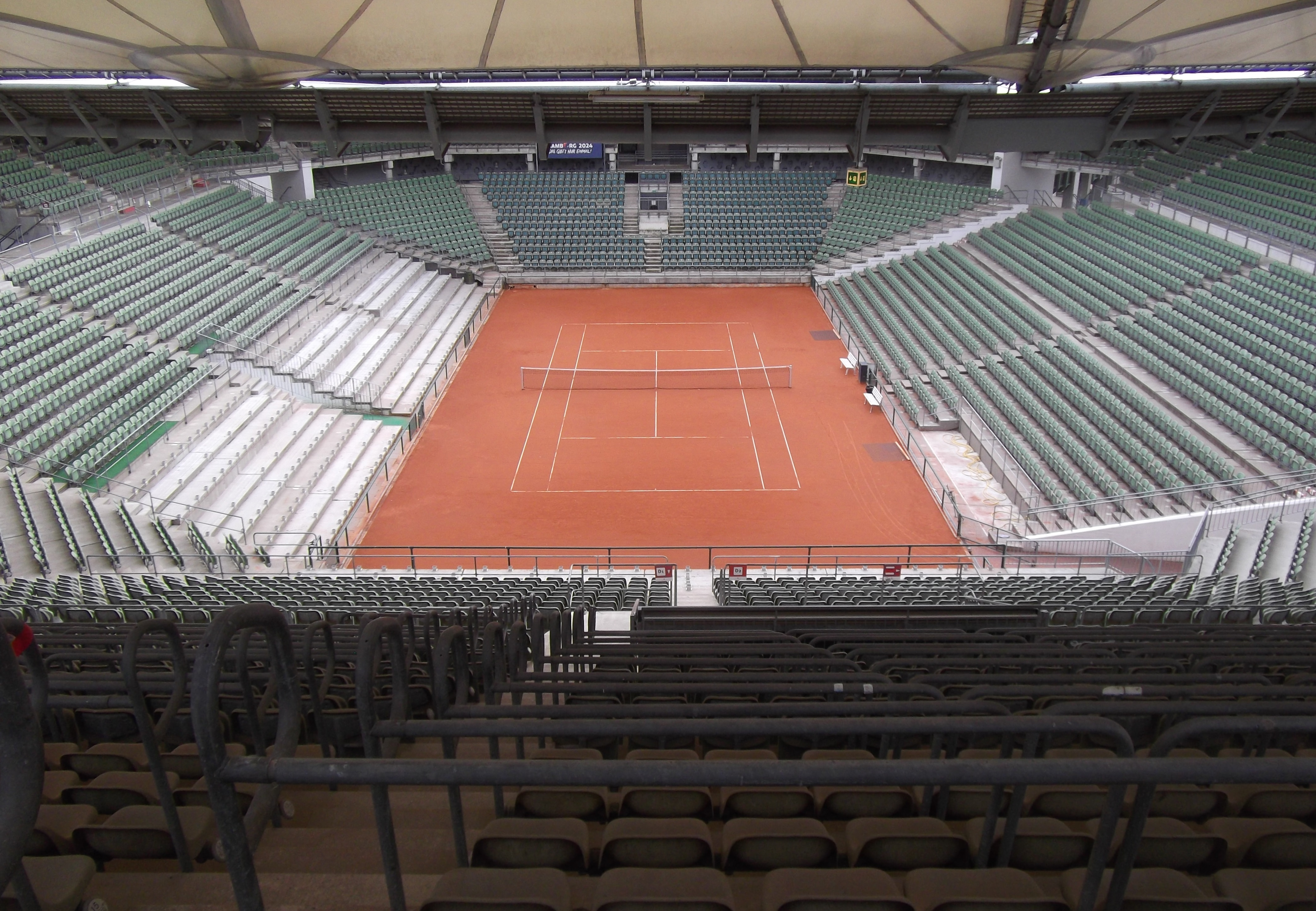
- Am Rothenbaum in 2015
- Interactive map of Am Rothenbaum
- Location: Hallerstraße 89; 20149 Hamburg, Germany
- Coordinates: 53°34′26″N 9°59′30″E
- Owner: Deutscher Tennis Bund e.V.
- Operator: Rothenbaum Sport GmbH
- Capacity: 13,200 (1999–2019); 10,000 (2020–)
- Type: retractable roof stadium
- Event: tennis
- Surface: clay court
- Scoreboard: Yes
- Public transit: Hallerstraße

Construction
- Opened: 1892
- Renovated: 1997−1999
- Cost: ? (€10m Renovation)
- Architect: ASP Schweger Assoziierte
- Structural engineers: Werner Sobek Ingenieure GmbH & Co. KG

Tenants
- International German Open (1924−present), FIVB Beach Volleyball World Tour; 2019 Beach Volleyball World Championships

Am Rothenbaum is the site of the main tennis court of the German Open Tennis Championships, played in the Harvestehude quarter of Hamburg, Germany. Though the site is called "Tennisstadion am Rothenbaum" (lit. Tennis Stadium at the Rothenbaum), it is today officially located in the Harvestehude quarter of Hamburg.

== History ==
The International German Open has been played at the "Rothenbaum" since 1892, making it Germany's longest-running tennis tournament. The current stadium was built in 1999 and holds 13,200 spectators, making it Germany's largest tennis venue. Today, it is one of the only two tournaments on German soil to be part of the ATP Tour 500 (the other being Halle Open), and one of the twenty largest tennis tournaments in the world.

== Location ==
"Tennisstadion am Rothenbaum" is located in Harvestehude at Hallerstraße 89, between Rothenbaumchaussee and Mittelweg. Nearest rapid transit station is Hallerstraße, directly next to the tennis park. The Außenalster, Hamburg's popular lake, is some 600 m apart.

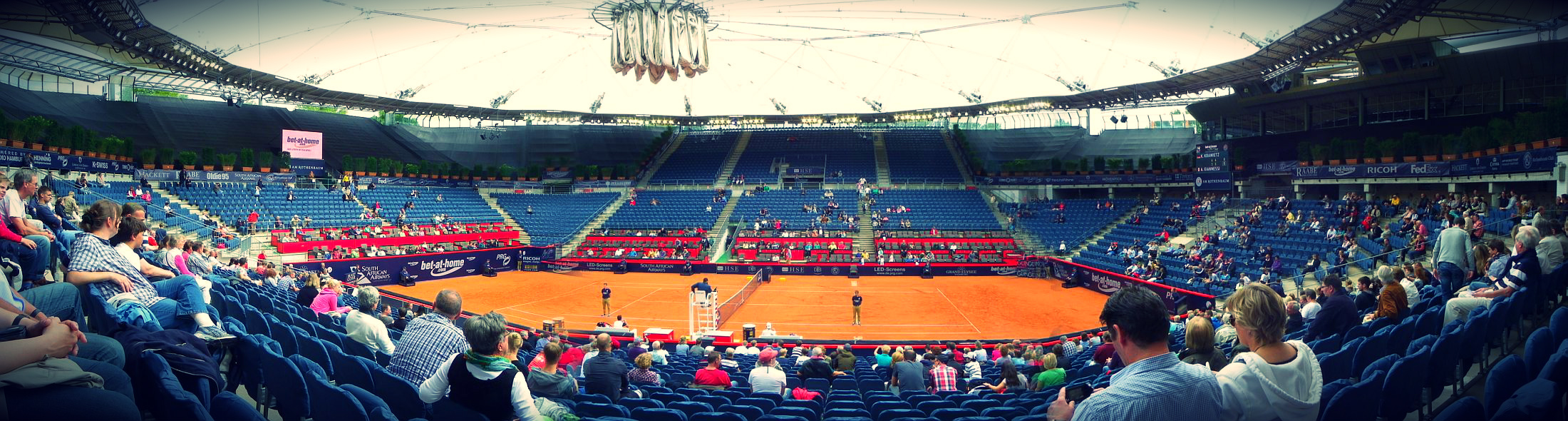
Main court at Am Rothenbaum during the 2012 International German Open

== Gallery ==
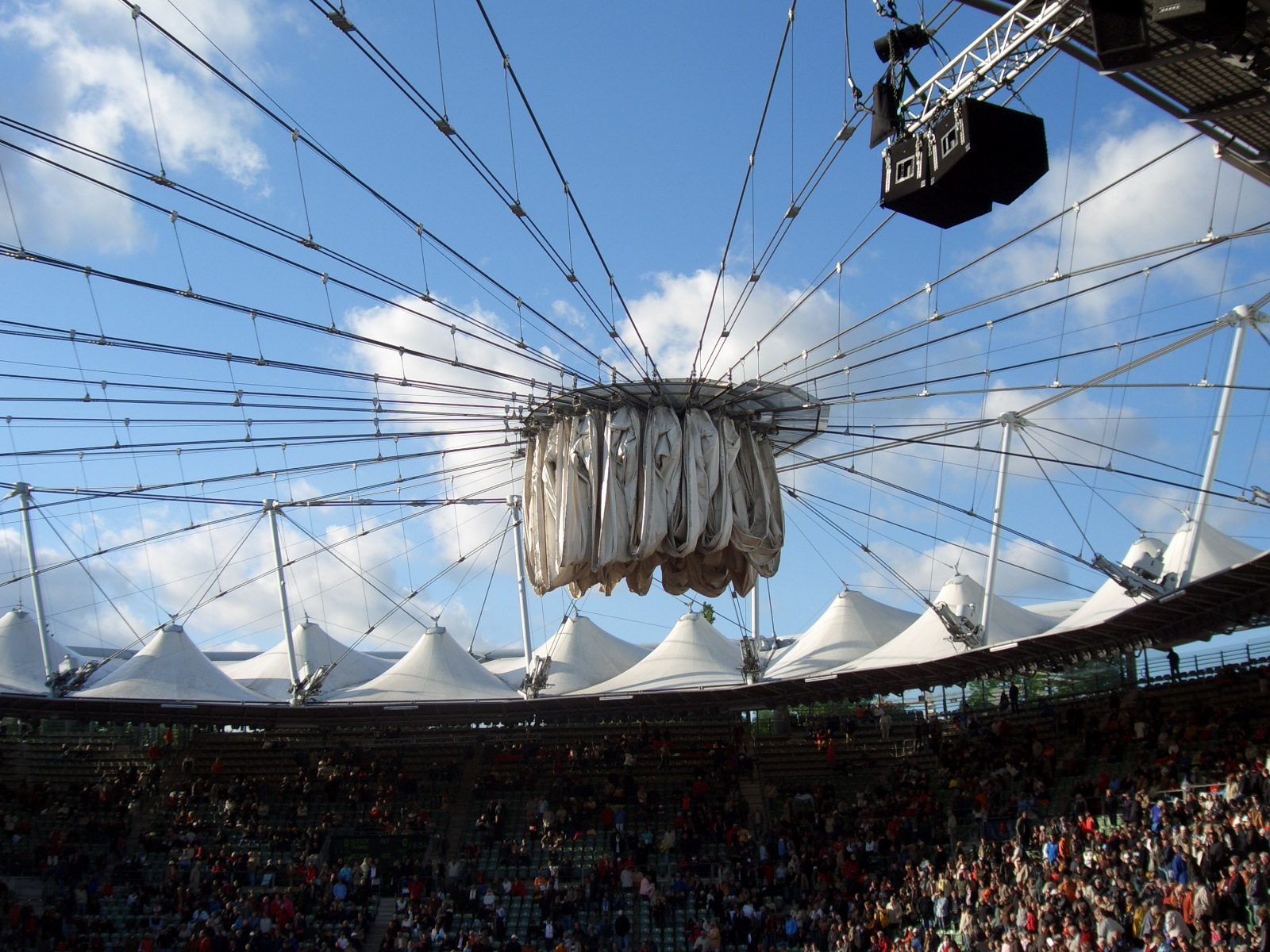

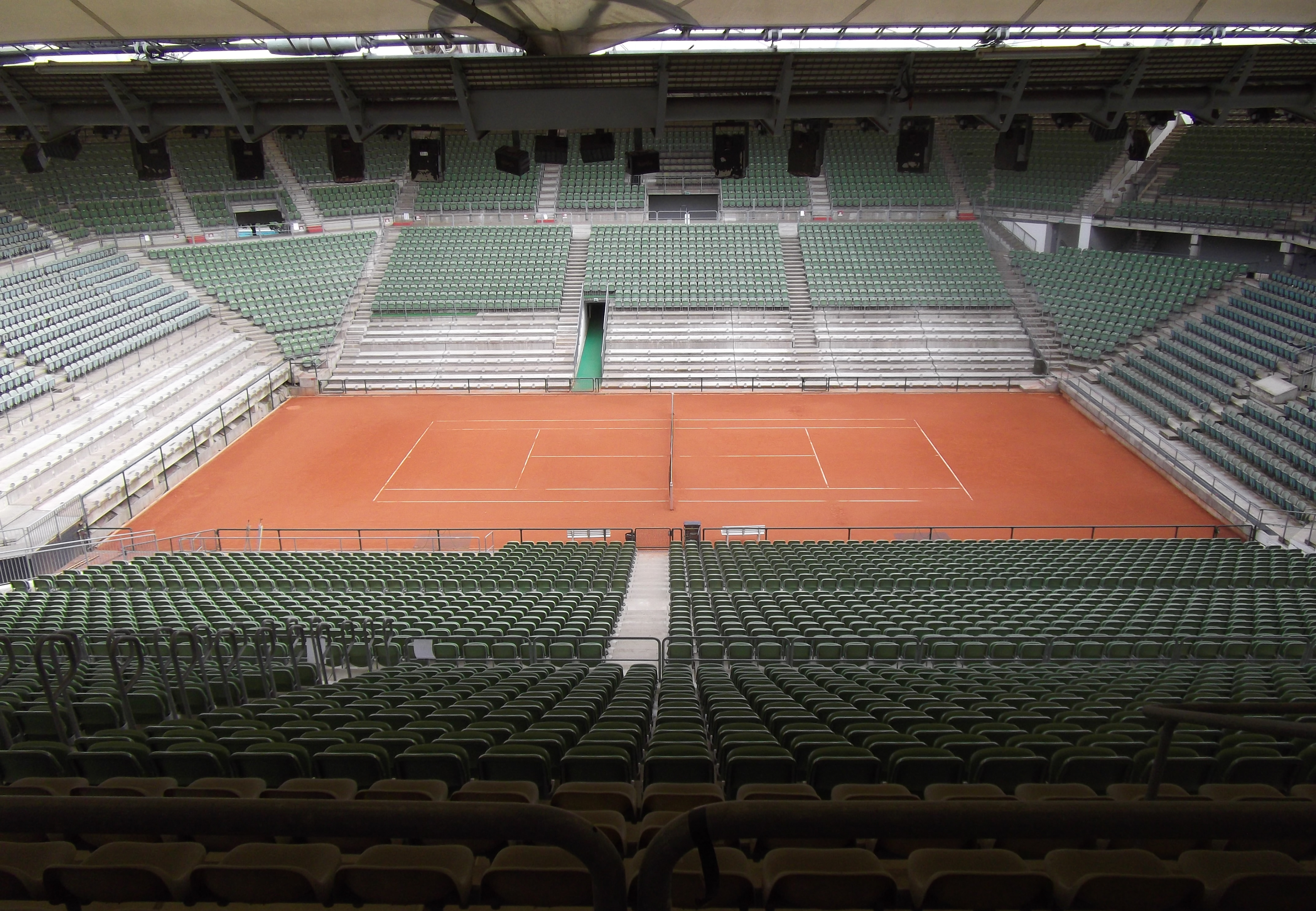

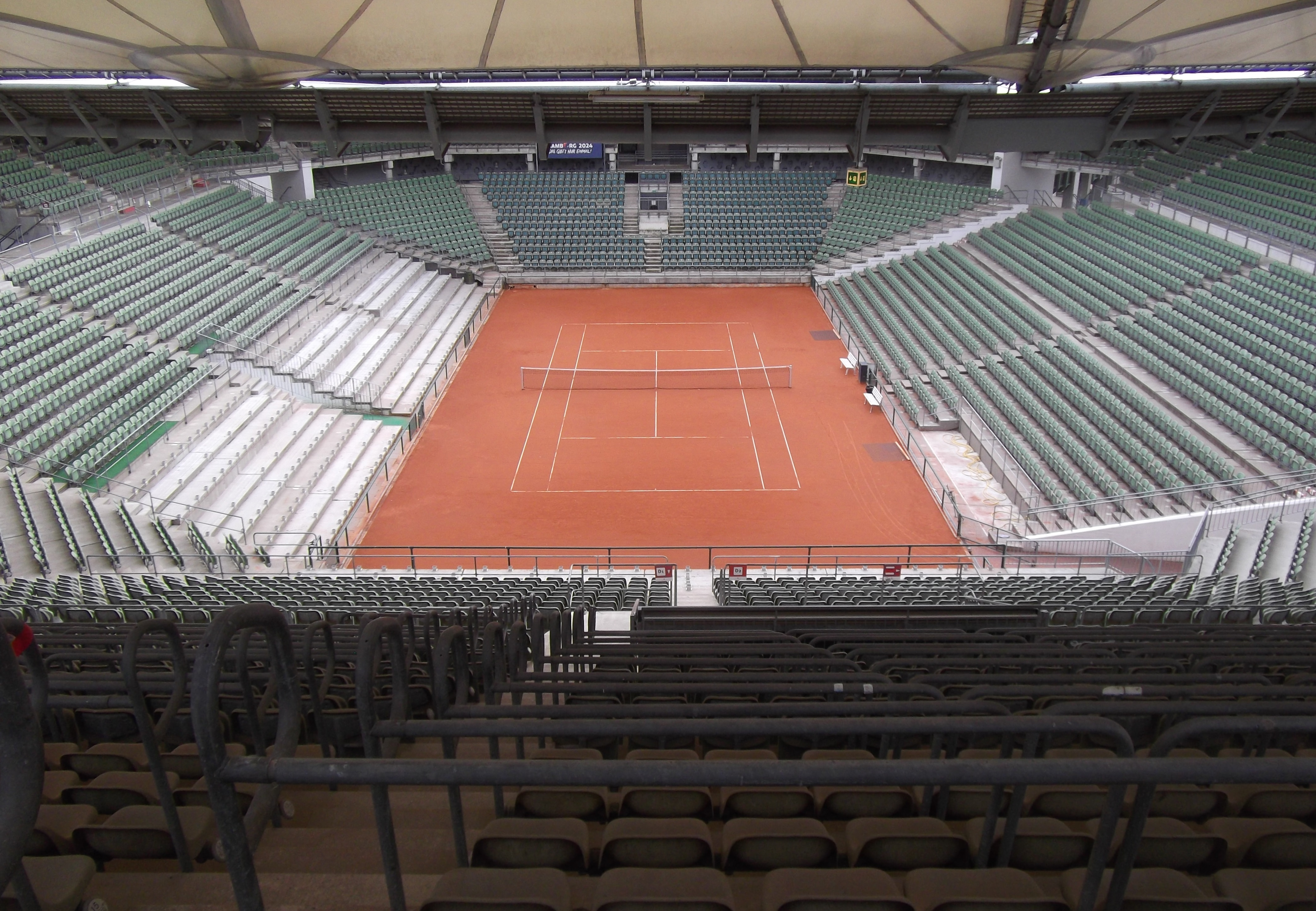

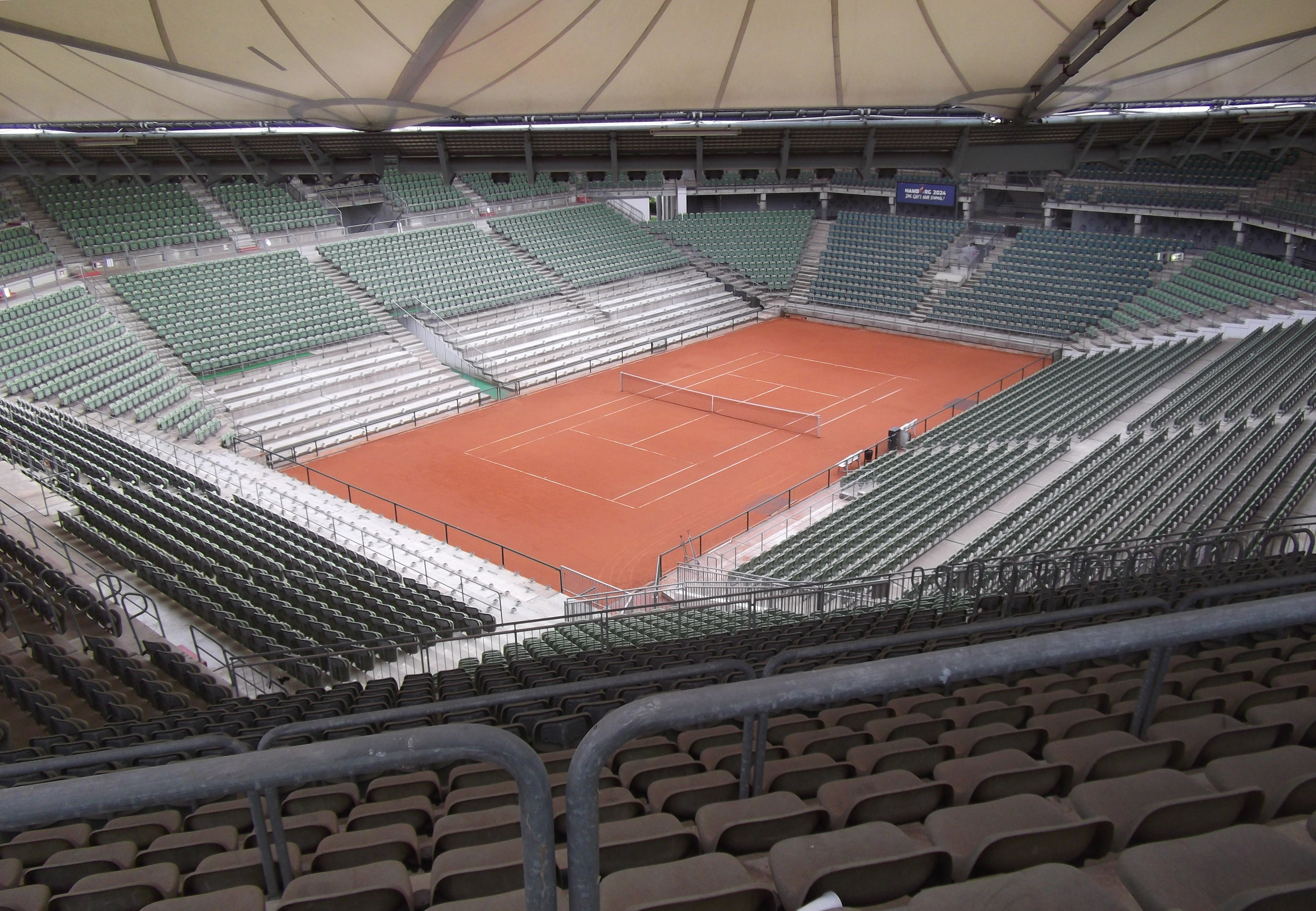

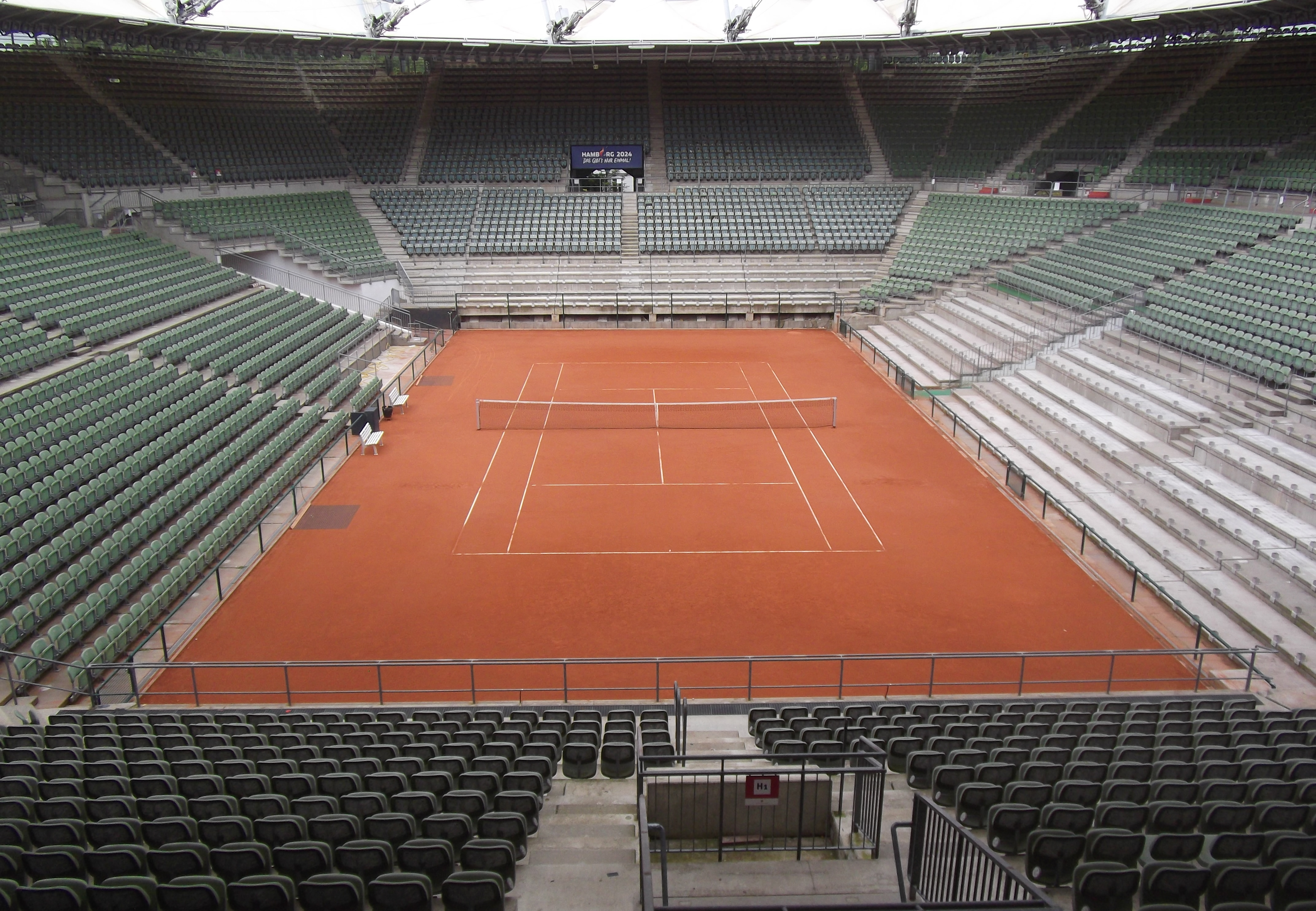

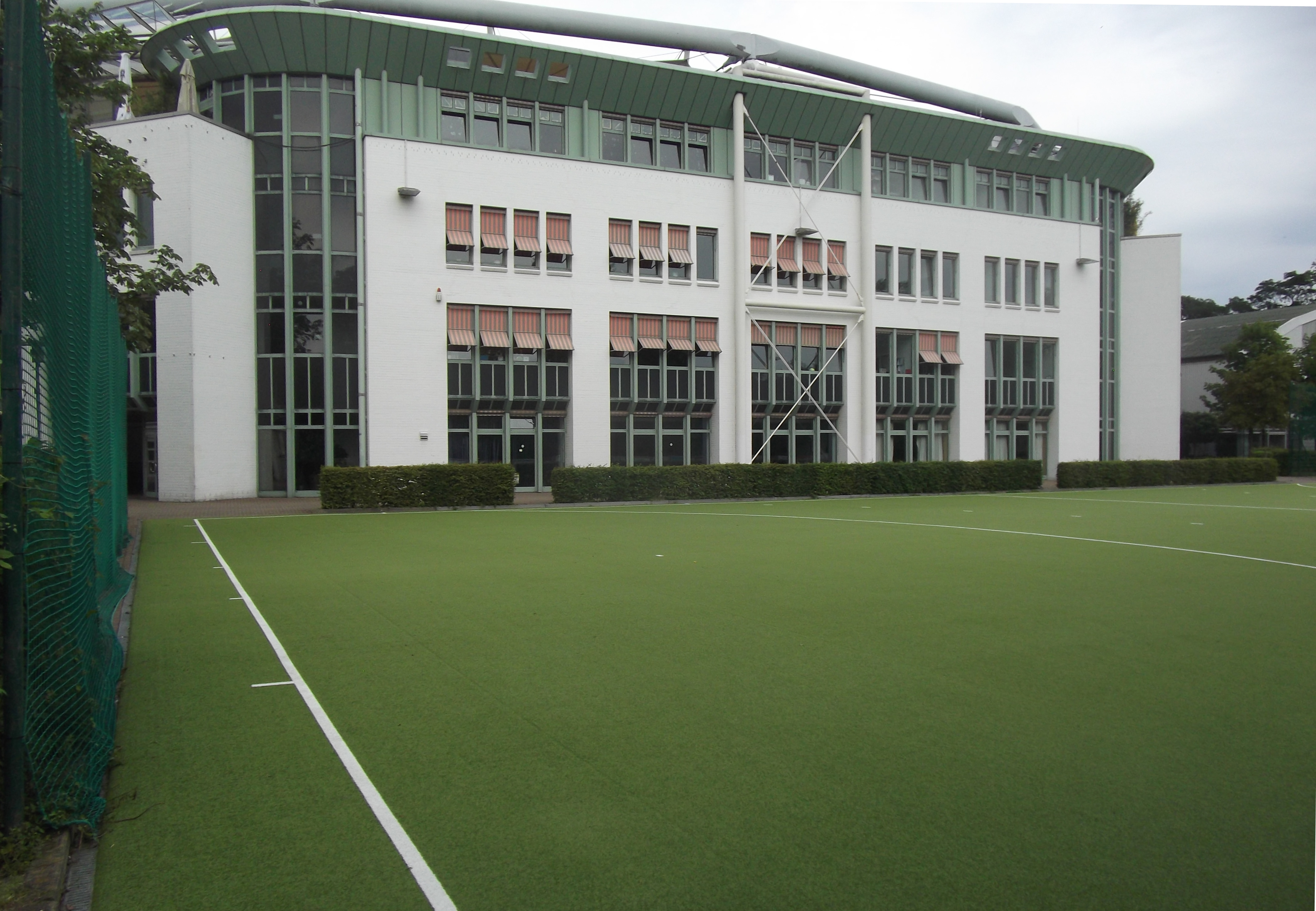

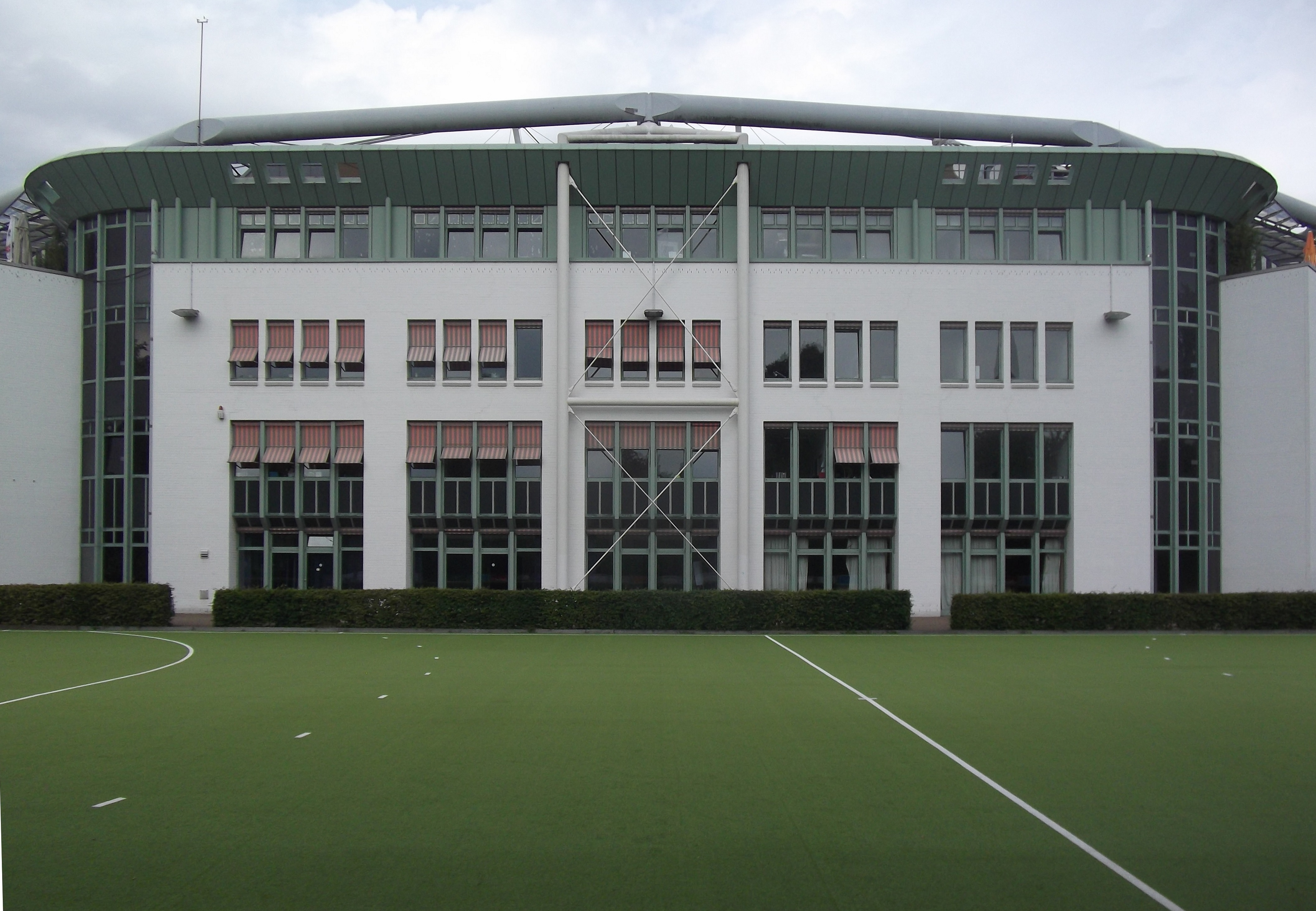

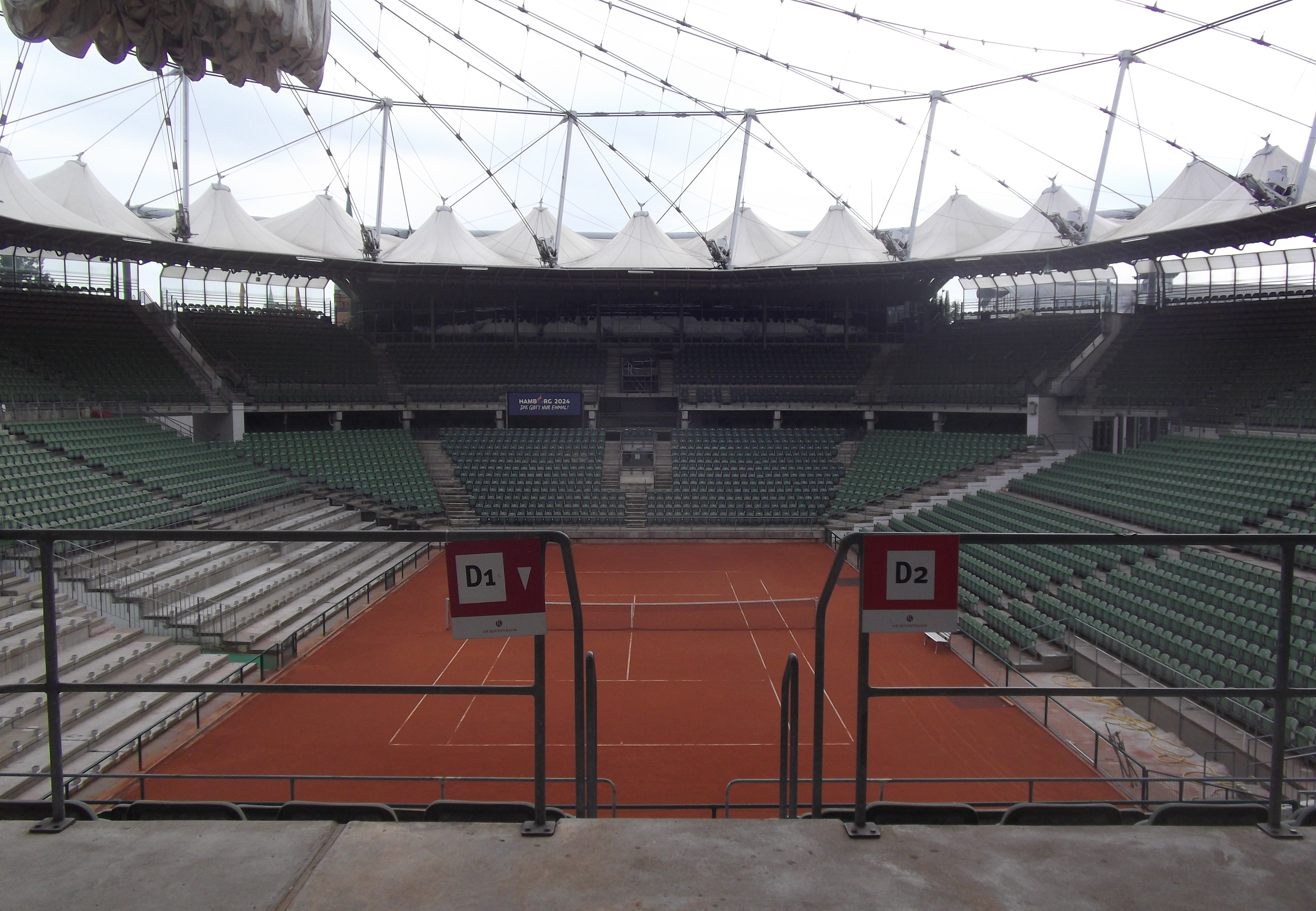

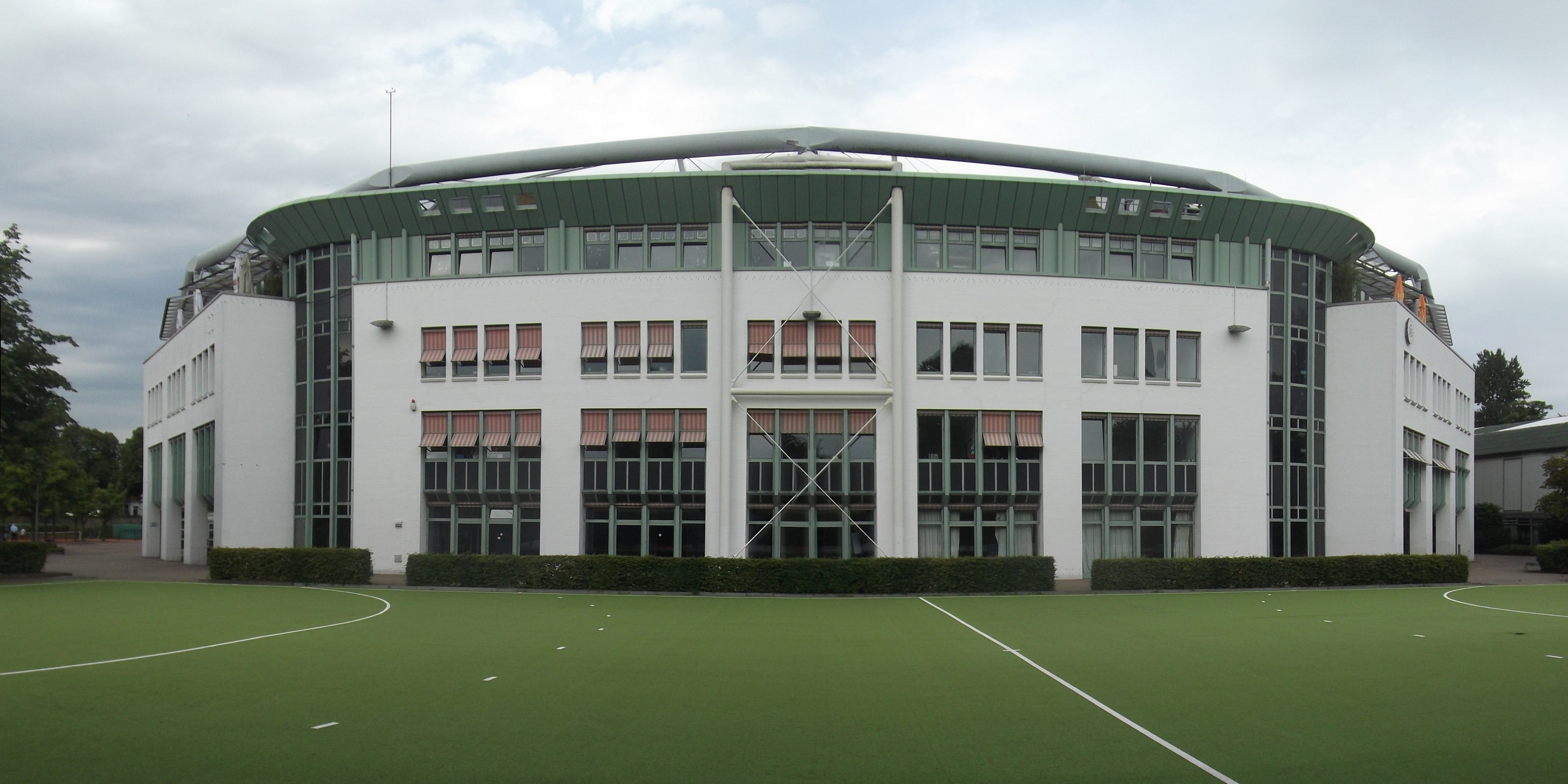

== See also ==
- List of tennis stadiums by capacity
