= 2026 Hamburg Open – Men's singles =

Men's singles
- 2026 Hamburg Open

Final
- Champion: (Peru) Ignacio Buse
- Runner-up: (United States) Tommy Paul
- Score: 7–6^{(8–6)}, 4–6, 6–3

Details
- Draw: 32 (4Q / 3WC)
- Seeds: 8

Events
Singles	men	women
Doubles	men	women
- Hamburg Open

Ignacio Buse defeated Tommy Paul in the final, 7–6^{(8–6)}, 4–6, 6–3 to win the men's singles tennis title at the 2026 Hamburg Open. It was his first ATP Tour title. Buse became the first qualifier to win the Hamburg Open since Nikoloz Basilashvili in 2018 and the first Peruvian player to win an ATP Tour singles title since Luis Horna in 2007.

Flavio Cobolli was the defending champion, but lost in the first round to Buse.

Aleksandar Kovacevic and Paul became the first American quarterfinalists at the event since Andre Agassi, and later semifinalists since Pete Sampras in 1995. Paul went on to become the first American finalist at Hamburg since Jimmy Connors in 1981. Kovacevic became the first lucky loser to reach the semifinal since Leonardo Mayer in 2017.

== Seeds ==
1. (Canada) Félix Auger-Aliassime (second round)
2. (United States) Ben Shelton (second round)
3. (Australia) Alex de Minaur (semifinals)
4. (Italy) Flavio Cobolli (first round)
5. Karen Khachanov (second round)
6. (United States) Tommy Paul (final)
7. (Italy) Luciano Darderi (quarterfinals)
8. (United States) Frances Tiafoe (second round)

== Draw ==
Key

- Q = Qualifier
- WC = Wild card
- LL = Lucky loser
- Alt = Alternate
- ITF = ITF entry
- PR = Protected ranking
- SR = Special ranking
- SE = Special exempt
- JE = Junior exempt
- JR = Junior Accelerator Programme entrant
- CO = College Accelerator Programme entrant
- NG = Next Gen Accelerator Program entrant
- w/o = Walkover
- r = Retired
- d = Defaulted

=== Finals ===
Semifinals
LL	(United States) Aleksandar Kovacevic	1	4
Q	(Peru) Ignacio Buse	6	6
3	(Australia) Alex de Minaur	6	3	3
6	(United States) Tommy Paul	2	6	6

Final
Q	(Peru) Ignacio Buse	7^{8}	4	6
6	(United States) Tommy Paul	6^{6}	6	3

=== Top half ===
First round
1	(Canada) F Auger-Aliassime	7	6
(Czech Republic) V Kopřiva	5	1
LL	(United States) A Kovacevic	6	7^{7}
Q	(France) A Géa	2	6^{3}
(Poland) K Majchrzak	6	2	3
(Argentina) C Ugo Carabelli	1	6	6
WC	(Germany) D Dedura	4	4
8	(United States) F Tiafoe	6	6
4	(Italy) F Cobolli	2	5
Q	(Peru) I Buse	6	7
(Czech Republic) J Menšík	7^{7}	6
WC	(Germany) J-L Struff	6^{3}	2
WC	(Germany) J Engel	3	6	6^{2}
(France) U Humbert	6	3	7^{7}
LL	(France) H Gaston	6	3	6^{4}
5	K Khachanov	3	6	7^{7}

Second round
1	(Canada) F Auger-Aliassime	6	5	4
LL	(United States) A Kovacevic	4	7	6
(Argentina) C Ugo Carabelli	7^{7}	7^{7}
8	(United States) F Tiafoe	6^{3}	6^{4}
Q	(Peru) I Buse	6	6
(Czech Republic) J Menšík	0	3
(France) U Humbert	6	3	7^{7}
5	K Khachanov	3	6	6^{3}

Quarterfinals
LL	(United States) A Kovacevic	6	6^{10}	6
(Argentina) C Ugo Carabelli	4	7^{12}	2
Q	(Peru) I Buse	6	5	6
(France) U Humbert	3	7	3

Semifinals
LL	(United States) A Kovacevic	1	4
Q	(Peru) I Buse	6	6

=== Bottom half ===
First round
7	(Italy) L Darderi	6	7^{7}
(Argentina) RA Burruchaga	3	6^{4}
(Germany) Y Hanfmann	6	6^{4}	6
Q	(Germany) M Schönhaus	3	7^{7}	4
(Spain) A Davidovich Fokina	6	6
(France) C Moutet	4	4
(Argentina) F Cerúndolo	6	4	3
3	(Australia) A de Minaur	3	6	6
6	(United States) T Paul	6	6
(United States) E Quinn	1	3
(France) T Atmane	2	6^{4}
(Argentina) TM Etcheverry	6	7^{7}
(Germany) D Altmaier	7	6
Q	(Australia) R Hijikata	5	2
LL	(United States) M Giron	3	6	6^{3}
2	(United States) B Shelton	6	4	7^{7}

Second round
7	(Italy) L Darderi	7^{9}	7
(Germany) Y Hanfmann	6^{7}	5
(Spain) A Davidovich Fokina	2	6	4
3	(Australia) A de Minaur	6	4	6
6	(United States) T Paul	6^{5}	7^{7}	7^{9}
(Argentina) TM Etcheverry	7^{7}	6^{5}	6^{7}
(Germany) D Altmaier	4	7^{7}	6
2	(United States) B Shelton	6	6^{4}	4

Quarterfinals
7	(Italy) L Darderi	0	3
3	(Australia) A de Minaur	6	6
6	(United States) T Paul	6	7
(Germany) D Altmaier	2	5

Semifinals
3	(Australia) A de Minaur	6	3	3
6	(United States) T Paul	2	6	6

== Qualifying ==
=== Seeds ===
1. (Peru) Ignacio Buse (qualified)
2. (United States) Marcos Giron (qualifying competition, lucky loser)
3. (United States) Aleksandar Kovacevic (qualifying competition, lucky loser)
4. (Australia) Rinky Hijikata (qualified)
5. (France) Luca Van Assche (first round)
6. (Chile) Cristian Garín (first round)
7. (France) Hugo Gaston (qualifying competition, lucky loser)
8. (France) Arthur Géa (qualified)

=== Qualifiers ===
1. (Peru) Ignacio Buse
2. (Germany) Max Schönhaus
3. (France) Arthur Géa
4. (Australia) Rinky Hijikata

=== Lucky losers ===
1. (United States) Marcos Giron
2. (United States) Aleksandar Kovacevic
3. (France) Hugo Gaston

=== Qualifying draw ===
==== First qualifier ====
First round
1	(Peru) Ignacio Buse	6	6
WC	(Germany) Niels McDonald	2	0
(Germany) Marko Topo	1	2
7	(France) Hugo Gaston	6	6

Qualifying competition
1	(Peru) Ignacio Buse	6	6
7	(France) Hugo Gaston	1	2

==== Second qualifier ====
First round
2	(United States) Marcos Giron	6	6
Alt	(India) Sumit Nagal	3	2
WC	(Germany) Max Schönhaus	6	6
5	(France) Luca Van Assche	3	3

Qualifying competition
2	(United States) Marcos Giron	7^{7}	4	6^{5}
WC	(Germany) Max Schönhaus	6^{5}	6	7^{7}

==== Third qualifier ====
First round
3	(United States) Aleksandar Kovacevic	6^{6}	7	6
(China) Zhang Zhizhen	7^{8}	5	2
WC	(Germany) Mika Petkovic	6^{5}	3
8	(France) Arthur Géa	7^{7}	6

Qualifying competition
3	(United States) Aleksandar Kovacevic	5	6	4
8	(France) Arthur Géa	7	4	6

==== Fourth qualifier ====
First round
4	(Australia) Rinky Hijikata	6	6^{3}	6
Alt	(Japan) Taro Daniel	3	7^{7}	2
(Germany) Henri Squire	1	6	6
6	(Chile) Cristian Garín	6	4	3

Qualifying competition
4	(Australia) Rinky Hijikata	6^{4}	7	7^{7}
(Germany) Henri Squire	7^{7}	5	6^{5}
