= 2014 International German Open =

- Date: 14–20 July
- Edition: 108th
- Category: ATP World Tour 500
- Draw: 48S / 16D
- Prize money: €1,190,700
- Surface: Clay / outdoor
- Location: Hamburg, Germany
- Venue: Am Rothenbaum

Champions

Singles
- (Argentina) Leonardo Mayer

Doubles
- (Croatia) Marin Draganja / (Romania) Florin Mergea
- International German Open

The 2014 International German Open (also known as the bet–at–home Open – German Tennis Championships 2014 for sponsorship reasons) was a men's tennis tournament played on outdoor red clay courts. It was the 108th edition of the event known that year as the International German Open and was part of the ATP World Tour 500 series of the 2014 ATP World Tour. It took place at the Am Rothenbaum in Hamburg, Germany, from 14 July through 20 July 2014. Unseeded Leonardo Mayer won the singles title.

== Finals ==
=== Singles ===
- (Argentina) Leonardo Mayer defeated (Spain) David Ferrer, 6–7^{(3–7)}, 6–1, 7–6^{(7–4)}

=== Doubles ===
- (Croatia) Marin Draganja / (Romania) Florin Mergea defeated (Austria) Alexander Peya / (Brazil) Bruno Soares, 6–4, 7–5

== Points and prize money ==
=== Points distribution ===
| Event | W | F | SF | QF | Round of 16 | Round of 32 | Round of 64 | Q | Q2 | Q1 |
| Singles | 500 | 300 | 180 | 90 | 45 | 20 | 0 | 10 | 4 | 0 |
| Doubles | 500 | 300 | 180 | 90 | 0 | —N/a | —N/a | —N/a | —N/a | —N/a |

=== Prize money ===
| Event | W | F | SF | QF | Round of 16 | Round of 32 | Round of 64 | Q2 | Q1 |
| Singles | €272,300 | €124,160 | €57,840 | €27,605 | €13,430 | €7,160 | €4,165 | €770 | €400 |
| Doubles | €84,970 | €38,340 | €18,080 | €8,740 | €4,470 | —N/a | —N/a | —N/a | —N/a |

== Singles main draw entrants ==
=== Seeds ===
| Country | Player | Rank^{1} | Seed |
|---|---|---|---|
| ESP | David Ferrer | 7 | 1 |
| ITA | Fabio Fognini | 15 | 2 |
| ESP | Tommy Robredo | 18 | 3 |
| UKR | Alexandr Dolgopolov | 19 | 4 |
| RUS | Mikhail Youzhny | 22 | 5 |
| ~~ESP~~ | ~~Roberto Bautista Agut~~ | ~~23~~ | ~~6~~ |
| GER | Philipp Kohlschreiber | 26 | 7 |
| ESP | Marcel Granollers | 28 | 8 |
| ESP | Fernando Verdasco | 29 | 9 |
| ESP | Guillermo García-López | 32 | 10 |
| COL | Santiago Giraldo | 34 | 11 |
| FRA | Gilles Simon | 36 | 12 |
| ARG | Federico Delbonis | 38 | 13 |
| POR | João Sousa | 40 | 14 |
| ARG | Carlos Berlocq | 41 | 15 |
| ITA | Andreas Seppi | 45 | 16 |

- ^{1} Rankings are as of July 7, 2014

=== Other entrants ===
The following players received wildcards into the singles main draw:

- (Spain) David Ferrer
- (Germany) Peter Gojowczyk
- (Germany) Tobias Kamke
- (Germany) Julian Reister
- (Germany) Alexander Zverev

The following players received entry from the qualifying draw:

- (Croatia) Mate Delić
- (Portugal) Gastão Elias
- (Spain) Daniel Gimeno Traver
- (Turkey) Marsel İlhan
- (Serbia) Filip Krajinović
- (Spain) Albert Ramos-Viñolas

The following player received entry as a lucky loser:

- (Brazil) Thomaz Bellucci

=== Withdrawals ===
Before the tournament

- (Spain) Nicolás Almagro → replaced by (Spain) Pablo Andújar
- (Spain) Roberto Bautista Agut → replaced by (Brazil) Thomaz Bellucci
- (France) Jérémy Chardy → replaced by (Spain) Pere Riba
- (Germany) Tommy Haas (shoulder injury) → replaced by (Czech Republic) Jiří Veselý
- (Uzbekistan) Denis Istomin → replaced by (Spain) Albert Montañés
- (Austria) Jürgen Melzer → replaced by (Germany) Dustin Brown
- (France) Stéphane Robert → replaced by (Serbia) Dušan Lajović

During the tournament

- (Slovakia) Martin Kližan

=== Retirements ===
- (Serbia) Filip Krajinović (stomach virus)
- (Germany) Julian Reister (right ankle injury)

== Doubles main draw entrants ==
=== Seeds ===
| Country | Player | Country | Player | Rank^{1} | Seed |
|---|---|---|---|---|---|
| AUT | Alexander Peya | BRA | Bruno Soares | 6 | 1 |
| ESP | David Marrero | ESP | Fernando Verdasco | 25 | 2 |
| ESP | Marcel Granollers | ESP | Marc López | 32 | 3 |
| GBR | Jamie Murray | AUS | John Peers | 55 | 4 |

- Rankings are as of July 7, 2014

=== Other entrants ===
The following pairs received wildcards into the doubles main draw:

- (Germany) Andre Begemann / (Germany) Alexander Zverev
- (Germany) Martin Emmrich / (Germany) Christopher Kas

The following pair received entry from the qualifying draw:

- (Kazakhstan) Mikhail Kukushkin / (Germany) Philipp Marx

The following pair received entry as lucky losers:

- (Argentina) Facundo Bagnis / (Argentina) Diego Sebastián Schwartzman

=== Withdrawals ===
Before the tournament

- (Spain) Roberto Bautista Agut (gastrointestinal illness)
- (Germany) Julian Reister (right ankle injury)
