= 2018 German Open =

- Date: 23–29 July
- Edition: 112th
- Category: ATP World Tour 500
- Surface: Clay / outdoor
- Location: Hamburg, Germany
- Venue: Am Rothenbaum

Champions

Singles
- (Georgia (country)) Nikoloz Basilashvili

Doubles
- (Chile) Julio Peralta / (Argentina) Horacio Zeballos
- German Open Tennis Championships

The 2018 German Open (also known as the 2018 German Tennis Championships) was a men's tennis tournament played on outdoor red clay courts. It was the 112th edition of the German Open Tennis Championships and part of the ATP World Tour 500 series of the 2018 ATP World Tour. It took place at the Am Rothenbaum in Hamburg, Germany, from 23 July through 29 July 2018. Unseeded Nikoloz Basilashvili, who qualified for the main draw, won the singles title.

== Finals ==
=== Singles ===
- (Georgia (country)) Nikoloz Basilashvili defeated (Argentina) Leonardo Mayer, 6–4, 0–6, 7–5

=== Doubles ===
- (Chile) Julio Peralta / (Argentina) Horacio Zeballos defeated (Austria) Oliver Marach / (Croatia) Mate Pavić, 6–1, 4–6, [10–6]

== Points and prize money ==
=== Points distribution ===
Event	W	F	SF	QF	Round of 16	Round of 32	Q	Q2	Q1
Singles	500	300	180	90	45	0	20	10	0
Doubles	500	300	180	90	0	—N/a	45	25	0

=== Prize money ===
Event	W	F	SF	QF	Round of 16	Round of 32	Q2	Q1
Singles	€349,200	€171,195	€86,145	€43,810	€22,750	€12,000	€2,655	€1,355
Doubles	€105,140	€51,470	€25,820	€13,250	€6,850	—N/a	—N/a	—N/a

== Singles main draw entrants ==
=== Seeds ===
Country	Player	Rank^{1}	Seed
AUT	Dominic Thiem	4	1
ARG	Diego Schwartzman	12	2
ESP	Pablo Carreño Busta	13	3
BIH	Damir Džumhur	23	4
GER	Philipp Kohlschreiber	24	5
ITA	Marco Cecchinato	27	6
FRA	Richard Gasquet	29	7
ESP	Fernando Verdasco	33	8

- ^{1} Rankings are as of 16 July 2018.

=== Other entrants ===
The following players received wildcards into the main draw:

- (Germany) Florian Mayer
- (Germany) Rudolf Molleker
- (Norway) Casper Ruud

The following player received entry as a special exempt:

- (Switzerland) Henri Laaksonen

The following players received entry from the qualifying draw:

- (Georgia (country)) Nikoloz Basilashvili
- (Slovakia) Jozef Kovalík
- (Germany) Daniel Masur
- (France) Corentin Moutet

The following player received entry as a lucky loser:

- (Brazil) Thiago Monteiro

=== Withdrawals ===
Before the tournament

- (Serbia) Filip Krajinović → replaced by (Slovenia) Aljaž Bedene
- (France) Lucas Pouille → replaced by (Chile) Nicolás Jarry
- (Italy) Andreas Seppi → replaced by (Brazil) Thiago Monteiro
- (Greece) Stefanos Tsitsipas → replaced by (Germany) Jan-Lennard Struff

During the tournament

- (France) Richard Gasquet

=== Retirements ===
- (Slovenia) Aljaž Bedene

== Doubles main draw entrants ==
=== Seeds ===
Country	Player	Country	Player	Rank^{1}	Seed
AUT	Oliver Marach	CRO	Mate Pavić	5	1
CRO	Ivan Dodig	NED	Jean-Julien Rojer	29	2
CRO	Nikola Mektić	AUT	Alexander Peya	42	3
URU	Pablo Cuevas	ESP	Marc López	50	4

- ^{1} Rankings are as of 16 July 2018.

=== Other entrants ===
The following pairs received wildcards into the doubles main draw:

- (Austria) Jürgen Melzer / (Austria) Dominic Thiem
- (Germany) Philipp Petzschner / (Germany) Tim Pütz

The following pair received entry from the qualifying draw:

- (Slovakia) Martin Kližan / (Slovakia) Jozef Kovalík
