= 2019 Hamburg European Open =

- Date: 22–28 July
- Edition: 113th
- Category: ATP Tour 500
- Draw: 32S / 16D
- Surface: Clay / outdoor
- Location: Hamburg, Germany
- Venue: Am Rothenbaum

Champions

Singles
- (Georgia (country)) Nikoloz Basilashvili

Doubles
- (Austria) Oliver Marach (Austria) Jürgen Melzer
- German Open Tennis Championships

The 2019 Hamburg Open was a men's tennis tournament played on outdoor red clay courts. It was the 113th edition of the German Open Tennis Championships and part of the ATP Tour 500 series of the 2019 ATP Tour. It took place at the Am Rothenbaum in Hamburg, Germany, from 22 July until 28 July 2019. Fourth-seeded Nikoloz Basilashvili won the singles title.

== Finals ==
=== Singles ===
- (Georgia (country)) Nikoloz Basilashvili defeated (Russia) Andrey Rublev, 7–5, 4–6, 6–3

=== Doubles ===
- (Austria) Oliver Marach / (Austria) Jürgen Melzer defeated (Netherlands) Robin Haase / (Netherlands) Wesley Koolhof, 6–2, 7–6 ^{(7–3)}

== Points and prize money ==
=== Points distribution ===
Event	W	F	SF	QF	Round of 16	Round of 32	Q	Q2	Q1
Singles	500	300	180	90	45	0	20	10	0
Doubles	500	300	180	90	0	—N/a	45	25	0

=== Prize money ===
Event	W	F	SF	QF	Round of 16	Round of 32	Q2	Q1
Singles	€354,845	€178,220	€89,925	€47,260	€23,620	€13,065	€5,025	€2,515
Doubles	€111,490	€54,570	€27,370	€14,040	€7,260	—N/a	—N/a	—N/a

== Singles main draw entrants ==
=== Seeds ===
Country	Player	Rank^{1}	Seed
AUT	Dominic Thiem	4	1
GER	Alexander Zverev	5	2
ITA	Fabio Fognini	9	3
GEO	Nikoloz Basilashvili	16	4
FRA	Benoît Paire	28	5
SRB	Laslo Đere	32	6
GER	Jan-Lennard Struff	35	7
CHI	Cristian Garín	37	8

- ^{1} Rankings are as of 15 July 2019.

=== Other entrants ===
The following players received wildcards into the main draw:

- (Germany) Daniel Altmaier
- (Germany) Yannick Hanfmann
- (Germany) Rudolf Molleker
- (Germany) Alexander Zverev

The following player received entry as a special exempt into the main draw:

- ~~(Italy) Salvatore Caruso~~

The following players received entry from the qualifying draw:

- (Bolivia) Hugo Dellien
- (Germany) Julian Lenz
- (Brazil) Thiago Monteiro
- (India) Sumit Nagal

The following player received entry as a lucky loser:

- (Spain) Alejandro Davidovich Fokina

=== Withdrawals ===
- (Italy) Salvatore Caruso → replaced by (Spain) Alejandro Davidovich Fokina

== Doubles main draw entrants ==
=== Seeds ===
Country	Player	Country	Player	Rank^{1}	Seed
CRO	Ivan Dodig	CRO	Mate Pavić	47	1
GER	Kevin Krawietz	GER	Andreas Mies	47	2
AUT	Oliver Marach	AUT	Jürgen Melzer	59	3
NED	Robin Haase	NED	Wesley Koolhof	59	4

- ^{1} Rankings are as of 15 July 2019.

=== Other entrants ===
The following pairs received wildcards into the doubles main draw:

- (Germany) Daniel Altmaier / (Germany) Johannes Härteis
- (Germany) Rudolf Molleker / (Serbia) Nenad Zimonjić

The following pair received entry from the qualifying draw:

- (Germany) Julian Lenz / (Germany) Daniel Masur
