= 2019 Hamburg European Open – Singles =

Singles
- 2019 Hamburg European Open

Final
- Champion: (Georgia (country)) Nikoloz Basilashvili
- Runner-up: (Russia) Andrey Rublev
- Score: 7–5, 4–6, 6–3

Details
- Draw: 32
- Seeds: 8

Events
Singles	Doubles
← 2018 ·	German Open Tennis Championships	· 2020 →

Nikoloz Basilashvili was the defending champion and successfully defended his title, defeating Andrey Rublev in the final, 7–5, 4–6, 6–3. En route to doing so, Basilashvili saved two match points against Alexander Zverev in the semifinals.

== Seeds ==
1. (Austria) Dominic Thiem (quarterfinals)
2. (Germany) Alexander Zverev (semifinals)
3. (Italy) Fabio Fognini (quarterfinals)
4. (Georgia (country)) Nikoloz Basilashvili (champion)
5. (France) Benoît Paire (first round)
6. (Serbia) Laslo Đere (first round)
7. (Germany) Jan-Lennard Struff (second round)
8. (Chile) Cristian Garín (first round)

== Draw ==
=== Key ===
- Q = Qualifier
- WC = Wild card
- LL = Lucky loser
- Alt = Alternate
- SE = Special exempt
- PR = Protected ranking
- ITF = ITF entry
- JE = Junior exempt
- w/o = Walkover
- r = Retired
- d = Defaulted
- SR = Special ranking

=== Finals ===
Semifinals
(Russia) Andrey Rublev	4	7	6
(Spain) Pablo Carreño Busta	6	5	1
4	(Georgia (country)) Nikoloz Basilashvili	6	4	7^{7}
2/WC	(Germany) Alexander Zverev	4	6	6^{5}

Final
(Russia) Andrey Rublev	5	6	3
4	(Georgia (country)) Nikoloz Basilashvili	7	4	6

=== Top half ===
First round
1	(Austria) D Thiem	6	7^{7}
(Uruguay) P Cuevas	3	6^{3}
(Germany) P Kohlschreiber	3	0
(Hungary) M Fucsovics	6	6
(Norway) C Ruud	6	3	6
(Netherlands) R Haase	3	6	1
(Russia) A Rublev	6	7^{7}
8	(Chile) C Garín	4	6^{5}
3	(Italy) F Fognini	6	6
Q	(Germany) J Lenz	4	4
(Argentina) L Mayer	6^{8}	4
WC	(Germany) R Molleker	7^{10}	6
(Spain) P Carreño Busta	7^{7}	6
WC	(Germany) Y Hanfmann	6^{5}	4
Q	(Brazil) T Monteiro	1	3
7	(Germany) J-L Struff	6	6

Second round
1	(Austria) D Thiem	7	6
(Hungary) M Fucsovics	5	1
(Norway) C Ruud	6	5	3
(Russia) A Rublev	3	7	6
3	(Italy) F Fognini	7	6
WC	(Germany) R Molleker	5	4
(Spain) P Carreño Busta	6	7^{7}
7	(Germany) J-L Struff	1	6^{4}

Quarterfinals
1	(Austria) D Thiem	6^{3}	6^{5}
(Russia) A Rublev	7^{7}	7^{7}
3	(Italy) F Fognini	6	2	6^{4}
(Spain) P Carreño Busta	3	6	7^{7}

Semifinals
(Russia) A Rublev	4	7	6
(Spain) P Carreño Busta	6	5	1

=== Bottom half ===
First round
5	(France) B Paire	7^{7}	5	3
(France) J Chardy	6^{4}	7	6
Q	(India) S Nagal	2	6^{2}
(France) R Gasquet	6	7^{7}
LL	(Spain) A Davidovich Fokina	3	2
(Argentina) JI Londero	6	6
Q	(Bolivia) H Dellien	4	3
4	(Georgia (country)) N Basilashvili	6	6
6	(Serbia) L Đere	3	3
(Serbia) F Krajinović	6	6
WC	(Germany) D Altmaier	2	2
(Slovakia) M Kližan	6	6
(Italy) M Cecchinato	7^{7}	6^{3}	2
(Argentina) F Delbonis	6^{5}	7^{7}	6
(Chile) N Jarry	4	2
2/WC	(Germany) A Zverev	6	6

Second round
(France) J Chardy	7^{7}	7
(France) R Gasquet	6^{5}	5
(Argentina) JI Londero	4	6	3
4	(Georgia (country)) N Basilashvili	6	3	6
(Serbia) F Krajinović	6^{6}	7	6
(Slovakia) M Kližan	7^{8}	5	1
(Argentina) F Delbonis	4	6^{2}
2/WC	(Germany) A Zverev	6	7^{7}

Quarterfinals
(France) J Chardy	2	3
4	(Georgia (country)) N Basilashvili	6	6
(Serbia) F Krajinović	6	5	2
2/WC	(Germany) A Zverev	2	7	6

Semifinals
4	(Georgia (country)) N Basilashvili	6	4	7^{7}
2/WC	(Germany) A Zverev	4	6	6^{5}

== Qualifying ==
=== Seeds ===
1. (Brazil) Thiago Monteiro (qualified)
2. (Bolivia) Hugo Dellien (qualified)
3. (Spain) Alejandro Davidovich Fokina (qualifying competition, lucky loser)
4. (Italy) Gianluca Mager (qualifying competition)
5. (Austria) Sebastian Ofner (first round)
6. (Spain) Pedro Martínez (first round)
7. (Portugal) João Domingues (first round)
8. (Slovakia) Jozef Kovalík (first round)

=== Qualifiers ===
1. (Brazil) Thiago Monteiro
2. (Bolivia) Hugo Dellien
3. (India) Sumit Nagal
4. (Germany) Julian Lenz

=== Lucky loser ===
1. (Spain) Alejandro Davidovich Fokina

=== Qualifying draw ===
==== First qualifier ====
First round				Qualifying competition
				1	(Brazil) Thiago Monteiro	6	6
					(Argentina) Carlos Berlocq	3	2
	(Argentina) Carlos Berlocq	6	7^{7}		(Argentina) Carlos Berlocq	3	2
8	(Slovakia) Jozef Kovalík	3	6^{3}

==== Second qualifier ====
First round
2	(Bolivia) Hugo Dellien	4	6	7
WC	(Germany) Daniel Masur	6	2	5
(Russia) Alexey Vatutin	6	6
6	(Spain) Pedro Martínez	3	4

Qualifying competition
2	(Bolivia) Hugo Dellien	7	7
(Russia) Alexey Vatutin	5	5

==== Third qualifier ====
First round
3	(Spain) Alejandro Davidovich Fokina	6	6
WC	(Germany) Johannes Härteis	2	3
(India) Sumit Nagal	7	6
5	(Austria) Sebastian Ofner	5	2

Qualifying competition
3	(Spain) Alejandro Davidovich Fokina	3	5
(India) Sumit Nagal	6	7

==== Fourth qualifier ====
First round
4	(Italy) Gianluca Mager	6	6
Alt	(Germany) Tobias Kamke	3	2
WC	(Germany) Julian Lenz	6	4	7^{7}
7	(Portugal) João Domingues	3	6	6^{4}

Qualifying competition
4	(Italy) Gianluca Mager	2	7^{7}	5
WC	(Germany) Julian Lenz	6	6^{4}	7
