= 2018 German Open – Doubles =

Doubles
- 2018 German Open

Final
- Champions: (Chile) Julio Peralta (Argentina) Horacio Zeballos
- Runners-up: (Austria) Oliver Marach (Croatia) Mate Pavić
- Score: 6–1, 4–6, [10–6]

Details
- Draw: 16
- Seeds: 4

Events
Singles	Doubles
- German Open Tennis Championships

Ivan Dodig and Mate Pavić were the defending champions, but chose not to participate together this year. Dodig played alongside Jean-Julien Rojer, but lost in the quarterfinals to Ben McLachlan and Jan-Lennard Struff. Pavić teamed up with Oliver Marach, but lost in the final to Julio Peralta and Horacio Zeballos, 1–6, 6–4, [6–10].

== Seeds ==
1. (Austria) Oliver Marach / (Croatia) Mate Pavić (final)
2. (Croatia) Ivan Dodig / (Netherlands) Jean-Julien Rojer (quarterfinals)
3. (Croatia) Nikola Mektić / (Austria) Alexander Peya (first round)
4. (Uruguay) Pablo Cuevas / (Spain) Marc López (quarterfinals)

== Draw ==
Key

- Q = Qualifier
- WC = Wild card
- LL = Lucky loser
- Alt = Alternate
- ITF = ITF entry
- PR = Protected ranking
- SR = Special ranking
- SE = Special exempt
- JE = Junior exempt
- JR = Junior Accelerator Programme entrant
- CO = College Accelerator Programme entrant
- NG = Next Gen Accelerator Program entrant
- w/o = Walkover
- r = Retired
- d = Defaulted

=== Draw ===
First round
1	(Austria) O Marach (Croatia) M Pavić	6	6
(Argentina) L Mayer (Argentina) D Schwartzman	3	4
(France) B Paire (France) É Roger-Vasselin	7	6
(United Kingdom) D Inglot (Croatia) F Škugor	5	2
3	(Croatia) N Mektić (Austria) A Peya	4	5
(Spain) D Marrero (Pakistan) A-u-H Qureshi	6	7
(Belarus) M Mirnyi (Austria) P Oswald	7^{7}	4	[5]
(New Zealand) M Daniell (Netherlands) W Koolhof	6^{4}	6	[10]
Q	(Slovakia) M Kližan (Slovakia) J Kovalík	2	7^{7}	[4]
(Chile) J Peralta (Argentina) H Zeballos	6	6^{5}	[10]
WC	(Germany) P Petzschner (Germany) T Pütz	4	1
4	(Uruguay) P Cuevas (Spain) M López	6	6
WC	(Austria) J Melzer (Austria) D Thiem	6^{5}	6^{4}
(Japan) B McLachlan (Germany) J-L Struff	7^{7}	7^{7}
(Bosnia and Herzegovina) D Džumhur (Chile) H Podlipnik-Castillo	6	3	[4]
2	(Croatia) I Dodig (Netherlands) J-J Rojer	4	6	[10]

Quarterfinals
1	(Austria) O Marach (Croatia) M Pavić	4	7^{7}	[10]
(France) B Paire (France) É Roger-Vasselin	6	6^{3}	[7]
(Spain) D Marrero (Pakistan) A-u-H Qureshi	1	2
(New Zealand) M Daniell (Netherlands) W Koolhof	6	6
(Chile) J Peralta (Argentina) H Zeballos	6^{10}	6	[10]
4	(Uruguay) P Cuevas (Spain) M López	7^{12}	4	[8]
(Japan) B McLachlan (Germany) J-L Struff	6^{12}	6	[10]
2	(Croatia) I Dodig (Netherlands) J-J Rojer	7^{14}	1	[8]

Semifinals
1	(Austria) O Marach (Croatia) M Pavić	2	6	[10]
(New Zealand) M Daniell (Netherlands) W Koolhof	6	4	[7]
(Chile) J Peralta (Argentina) H Zeballos	4	7	[10]
(Japan) B McLachlan (Germany) J-L Struff	6	5	[7]

Final
1	(Austria) O Marach (Croatia) M Pavić	1	6	[6]
(Chile) J Peralta (Argentina) H Zeballos	6	4	[10]

== Qualifying ==
=== Seeds ===
1. (Chile) Nicolás Jarry / (Germany) Maximilian Marterer (qualifying competition)
2. (Germany) Andre Begemann / (Romania) Florin Mergea (first round)

=== Qualifiers ===
1. (Slovakia) Martin Kližan / (Slovakia) Jozef Kovalík

=== Qualifying draw ===
First round
1	(Chile) Nicolás Jarry (Germany) Maximilian Marterer	6	6
Alt	(Germany) Tobias Kamke (Germany) George von Massow	3	3
(Slovakia) Martin Kližan (Slovakia) Jozef Kovalík	7^{7}	6^{5}	[11]
2/WC	(Germany) Andre Begemann (Romania) Florin Mergea	6^{4}	7^{7}	[9]

Qualifying competition
1	(Chile) Nicolás Jarry (Germany) Maximilian Marterer	4	0
(Slovakia) Martin Kližan (Slovakia) Jozef Kovalík	6	6
