= 2019 Hamburg European Open – Doubles =

Doubles
- 2019 Hamburg European Open

Final
- Champions: (Austria) Oliver Marach (Austria) Jürgen Melzer
- Runners-up: (Netherlands) Robin Haase (Netherlands) Wesley Koolhof
- Score: 6–2, 7–6^{(7–3)}

Details
- Draw: 16
- Seeds: 4

Events
Singles	Doubles
- German Open Tennis Championships

Julio Peralta and Horacio Zeballos were the defending champions, but Peralta chose not to participate this year. Zeballos played alongside Leonardo Mayer, but lost in the first round to Pablo Cuevas and Nicolás Jarry.

Oliver Marach and Jürgen Melzer won the title, defeating Robin Haase and Wesley Koolhof in the final, 6–2, 7–6^{(7–3)}.

== Seeds ==
1. (Croatia) Ivan Dodig / (Croatia) Mate Pavić (semifinals)
2. (Germany) Kevin Krawietz / (Germany) Andreas Mies (quarterfinals)
3. (Austria) Oliver Marach / (Austria) Jürgen Melzer (champions)
4. (Netherlands) Robin Haase / (Netherlands) Wesley Koolhof (final)

== Draw ==
Key

- Q = Qualifier
- WC = Wild card
- LL = Lucky loser
- Alt = Alternate
- ITF = ITF entry
- PR = Protected ranking
- SR = Special ranking
- SE = Special exempt
- JE = Junior exempt
- JR = Junior Accelerator Programme entrant
- CO = College Accelerator Programme entrant
- NG = Next Gen Accelerator Program entrant
- w/o = Walkover
- r = Retired
- d = Defaulted

=== Draw ===
First round
1	(Croatia) I Dodig (Croatia) M Pavić	7^{7}	6
(France) J Chardy (France) R Gasquet	6^{2}	4
WC	(Germany) D Altmaier (Germany) J Härteis	4	2
(Germany) T Pütz (Germany) J-L Struff	6	6
4	(Netherlands) R Haase (Netherlands) W Koolhof	3	6	[10]
(Bolivia) H Dellien (Brazil) T Monteiro	6	3	[5]
Q	(Germany) J Lenz (Germany) D Masur	4	6	[11]
(Germany) A Zverev (Germany) M Zverev	6	3	[9]
(India) R Bopanna (Spain) P Carreño Busta	6	5	[10]
WC	(Germany) R Molleker (Serbia) N Zimonjić	3	7	[3]
(Italy) M Cecchinato (France) B Paire	2	1
3	(Austria) O Marach (Austria) J Melzer	6	6
(Uruguay) P Cuevas (Chile) N Jarry	6	6
(Argentina) L Mayer (Argentina) H Zeballos	3	4
(Czech Republic) R Jebavý (Netherlands) M Middelkoop	5	7^{11}	[10]
2	(Germany) K Krawietz (Germany) A Mies	7	6^{9}	[12]

Quarterfinals
1	(Croatia) I Dodig (Croatia) M Pavić	6	6
(Germany) T Pütz (Germany) J-L Struff	2	3
4	(Netherlands) R Haase (Netherlands) W Koolhof	7^{7}	6
Q	(Germany) J Lenz (Germany) D Masur	6^{5}	4
(India) R Bopanna (Spain) P Carreño Busta	1	4
3	(Austria) O Marach (Austria) J Melzer	6	6
(Uruguay) P Cuevas (Chile) N Jarry	6	4	[10]
2	(Germany) K Krawietz (Germany) A Mies	3	6	[7]

Semifinals
1	(Croatia) I Dodig (Croatia) M Pavić	6^{2}	6	[8]
4	(Netherlands) R Haase (Netherlands) W Koolhof	7^{7}	4	[10]
3	(Austria) O Marach (Austria) J Melzer	7^{7}	6
(Uruguay) P Cuevas (Chile) N Jarry	6^{2}	3

Final
4	(Netherlands) R Haase (Netherlands) W Koolhof	2	6^{3}
3	(Austria) O Marach (Austria) J Melzer	6	7^{7}

== Qualifying ==
=== Seeds ===
1. (Monaco) Romain Arneodo / (Belarus) Andrei Vasilevski (first round)
2. (Chile) Hans Podlipnik Castillo / (Spain) David Vega Hernández (qualifying competition)

=== Qualifiers ===
1. (Germany) Julian Lenz / (Germany) Daniel Masur

=== Qualifying draw ===
First round
1	(Monaco) Romain Arneodo (Belarus) Andrei Vasilevski	2	3
(Germany) Julian Lenz (Germany) Daniel Masur	6	6
WC	(Germany) Jason Jeremy Hildebrandt (Germany) Lewie Lane	2	6	[4]
2	(Chile) Hans Podlipnik Castillo (Spain) David Vega Hernández	6	3	[10]

Qualifying competition
(Germany) Julian Lenz (Germany) Daniel Masur	6	6
2	(Chile) Hans Podlipnik Castillo (Spain) David Vega Hernández	3	2
