= 2026 Hamburg Open – Men's doubles =

Men's doubles
- 2026 Hamburg Open

Final
- Champions: (Germany) Kevin Krawietz (Germany) Tim Pütz
- Runners-up: (France) Sadio Doumbia (France) Fabien Reboul
- Score: 6–3, 4–6, [10–8]

Details
- Draw: 16
- Seeds: 4

Events
Singles	men	women
Doubles	men	women
- Hamburg Open

Kevin Krawietz and Tim Pütz defeated Sadio Doumbia and Fabien Reboul in the final, 6–3, 4–6, [10–8] to win the men's doubles tennis title at the 2026 Hamburg Open.

Simone Bolelli and Andrea Vavassori were the defending champions, but lost in the first round to Doumbia and Reboul.

== Seeds ==
1. (United Kingdom) Julian Cash / (United Kingdom) Lloyd Glasspool (quarterfinals)
2. (United States) Christian Harrison / (United Kingdom) Neal Skupski (quarterfinals)
3. (Germany) Kevin Krawietz / (Germany) Tim Pütz (champions)
4. (Italy) Simone Bolelli / (Italy) Andrea Vavassori (first round)

== Draw ==
Key

- Q = Qualifier
- WC = Wild card
- LL = Lucky loser
- Alt = Alternate
- ITF = ITF entry
- PR = Protected ranking
- SR = Special ranking
- SE = Special exempt
- JE = Junior exempt
- JR = Junior Accelerator Programme entrant
- CO = College Accelerator Programme entrant
- NG = Next Gen Accelerator Program entrant
- w/o = Walkover
- r = Retired
- d = Defaulted

First round
1	(United Kingdom) J Cash (United Kingdom) L Glasspool	6	3	[10]
Q	(Brazil) F Romboli (United States) R Seggerman	4	6	[7]
(Argentina) G Andreozzi (France) M Guinard	3	6	[10]
(France) T Atmane (Argentina) TM Etcheverry	6	0	[8]
3	(Germany) K Krawietz (Germany) T Pütz	6	7^{7}
(Monaco) H Nys (France) É Roger-Vasselin	4	6^{5}
(Austria) A Erler (Austria) L Miedler	6^{5}	6	[10]
(Sweden) A Göransson (United States) E King	7^{7}	4	[8]
(France) T Arribagé (France) A Olivetti	6	3	[10]
WC	(Germany) H Jebens (Germany) T Rühl	4	6	[7]
(France) S Doumbia (France) F Reboul	6	7^{7}
4	(Italy) S Bolelli (Italy) A Vavassori	2	6^{3}
(Portugal) F Cabral (United Kingdom) J Salisbury	6	3	[8]
WC	(Germany) J Schnaitter (Germany) M Wallner	2	6	[10]
(Brazil) O Luz (Brazil) R Matos	6	1	[5]
2	(United States) C Harrison (United Kingdom) N Skupski	4	6	[10]

Quarterfinals
1	(United Kingdom) J Cash (United Kingdom) L Glasspool	4	6	[6]
(Argentina) G Andreozzi (France) M Guinard	6	3	[10]
3	(Germany) K Krawietz (Germany) T Pütz	6	7
(Austria) A Erler (Austria) L Miedler	3	5
(France) T Arribagé (France) A Olivetti	4	6	[8]
(France) S Doumbia (France) F Reboul	6	3	[10]
WC	(Germany) J Schnaitter (Germany) M Wallner	7	6
2	(United States) C Harrison (United Kingdom) N Skupski	5	4

Semifinals
(Argentina) G Andreozzi (France) M Guinard
3	(Germany) K Krawietz (Germany) T Pütz	w/o
(France) S Doumbia (France) F Reboul	6^{4}	6	[10]
WC	(Germany) J Schnaitter (Germany) M Wallner	7^{7}	3	[5]

Finals
3	(Germany) K Krawietz (Germany) T Pütz	6	4	[10]
(France) S Doumbia (France) F Reboul	3	6	[8]

== Qualifying ==
=== Seeds ===
1. (Brazil) Fernando Romboli / (United States) Ryan Seggerman (qualified)
2. (Belgium) Sander Gillé / (Netherlands) Sem Verbeek (first round)

=== Qualifiers ===
1. (Brazil) Fernando Romboli / (United States) Ryan Seggerman

=== Qualifying draw ===
First round
1	(Brazil) Fernando Romboli (United States) Ryan Seggerman	6	6
WC	(Germany) Niels McDonald (Germany) Max Schönhaus	4	4
Alt	(India) Sriram Balaji (Brazil) Marcelo Demoliner	7^{7}	6
2	(Belgium) Sander Gillé (Netherlands) Sem Verbeek	6^{3}	3

Qualifying competition
1	(Brazil) Fernando Romboli (United States) Ryan Seggerman	6	6
Alt	(India) Sriram Balaji (Brazil) Marcelo Demoliner	4	3
