= 2026 Hamburg Open – Women's singles =

Women's singles
- 2026 Hamburg Open

Final
- Champion: (Germany) Tamara Korpatsch
- Runner-up: (Hungary) Anna Bondár
- Score: 6–3, 6–3
- Date: 26 July 2026

Details
- Draw: 32
- Seeds: 8

Events
Singles	men	women
Doubles	men	women
- Hamburg Open

Tamara Korpatsch defeated Anna Bondár in the final, 6–3, 6–3 to win the women's singles tennis title at the 2026 Hamburg Open. It was her second WTA Tour singles title, and she was the first German woman to win the Hamburg Open since Steffi Graf in 1992.

Loïs Boisson was the reigning champion, but did not participate this year.

With Elina Avanesyan and Alina Charaeva reaching the quarterfinals, this marked the first time that multiple Armenians reached the quarterfinals of a WTA Tour event. Bondár reached her second straight Hamburg Open final, despite being three match points down in her semifinal clash against Avanesyan.

== Seeds ==
1. (Ukraine) Oleksandra Oliynykova (quarterfinals, withdrew)
2. (Ukraine) Anhelina Kalinina (quarterfinals)
3. (Hungary) Panna Udvardy (second round)
4. (Hungary) Anna Bondár (final)
5. (Germany) Tamara Korpatsch (champion)
6. (Switzerland) Simona Waltert (first round)
7. (Kazakhstan) Yulia Putintseva (second round)
8. (Austria) Sinja Kraus (second round)

== Draw ==
Key

- Q = Qualifier
- WC = Wild card
- LL = Lucky loser
- Alt = Alternate
- ITF = ITF entry
- PR = Protected ranking
- SR = Special ranking
- SE = Special exempt
- JE = Junior exempt
- JR = Junior Accelerator Programme entrant
- CO = College Accelerator Programme entrant
- NG = Next Gen Accelerator Program entrant
- w/o = Walkover
- r = Retired
- d = Defaulted

=== Finals ===
Semifinals
Q	(Armenia) Elina Avanesyan	6^{3}	6	6^{2}
4	(Hungary) Anna Bondár	7^{7}	4	7^{7}
(Egypt) Mayar Sherif	1	0^{r}
5	(Germany) Tamara Korpatsch	6	2

Final
4	(Hungary) Anna Bondár	3	3
5	(Germany) Tamara Korpatsch	6	6

=== Top half ===
First round
1	(Ukraine) O Oliynykova	6	3	7
WC	(Germany) N Schunk	2	6	5
(Spain) L Romero Gormaz	6	6
(Slovenia) V Erjavec	2	2
Q	(Netherlands) A Rus	2	1
Q	(Armenia) E Avanesyan	6	6
Q	(Germany) M Barthel	2	6^{5}
7	(Kazakhstan) Y Putintseva	6	7^{7}
4	(Hungary) A Bondár	7	6
(Japan) M Uchijima	5	4
WC	(Germany) V Steiner	3	6	2
(Germany) N Noha Akugue	6	2	6
PR	(Spain) S Sorribes Tormo	6	5	1
(Armenia) A Charaeva	3	7	6
(Latvia) D Semeņistaja	6	3	2
8	(Austria) S Kraus	3	6	6

Second round
1	(Ukraine) O Oliynykova	7^{7}	3	6
(Spain) L Romero Gormaz	6^{3}	6	2
Q	(Armenia) E Avanesyan	6	2	6
7	(Kazakhstan) Y Putintseva	3	6	2
4	(Hungary) A Bondár	6	3	7
(Germany) N Noha Akugue	1	6	5
(Armenia) A Charaeva	5	7	7
8	(Austria) S Kraus	7	5	5

Quarterfinals
1	(Ukraine) O Oliynykova
Q	(Armenia) E Avanesyan	w/o
4	(Hungary) A Bondár	6	7^{7}
(Armenia) A Charaeva	1	6^{3}

Semifinals
Q	(Armenia) E Avanesyan	6^{3}	6	6^{2}
4	(Hungary) A Bondár	7^{7}	4	7^{7}

=== Bottom half ===
First round
6	(Switzerland) S Waltert	7	4	6^{3}
(Egypt) M Sherif	5	6	7^{7}
WC	(Germany) T Brockmann	5	1
(France) E Jacquemot	7	6
(Poland) K Kawa	5	4
(Spain) P Badosa	7	6
Q	E Pridankina	4	2
3	(Hungary) P Udvardy	6	6
5	(Germany) T Korpatsch	4	7	1
(Andorra) V Jiménez Kasintseva	6	5	0^{r}
PR	(Argentina) N Podoroska	6	3	4
WC	(Germany) J Stusek	4	6	6
Q	(Argentina) ML Carlé	7	6
Q	(Germany) J Niemeier	5	2
(Spain) K Quevedo	5	4
2	(Ukraine) A Kalinina	7	6

Second round
(Egypt) M Sherif	6	6
(France) E Jacquemot	2	3
(Spain) P Badosa	6	6
3	(Hungary) P Udvardy	4	1
5	(Germany) T Korpatsch	6	3	6
WC	(Germany) J Stusek	0	6	3
Q	(Argentina) ML Carlé	1	3
2	(Ukraine) A Kalinina	6	6

Quarterfinals
(Egypt) M Sherif	7^{7}	6^{2}	6
(Spain) P Badosa	6^{4}	7^{7}	4
5	(Germany) T Korpatsch	6	1	6
2	(Ukraine) A Kalinina	3	6	1

Semifinals
(Egypt) M Sherif	1	0^{r}
5	(Germany) T Korpatsch	6	2

== Qualifying ==
=== Seeds ===
1. (United States) Varvara Lepchenko (qualifying competition)
2. (Netherlands) Eva Vedder (qualifying competition)
3. Julia Avdeeva (first round)
4. (Netherlands) Arantxa Rus (qualified)
5. Elena Pridankina (qualified)
6. (France) Carole Monnet (first round, retired)
7. (Argentina) María Lourdes Carlé (qualified)
8. (Germany) Mona Barthel (qualified)
9. (Armenia) Elina Avanesyan (qualified)
10. (Liechtenstein) Kathinka von Deichmann (first round)
11. (Sweden) Lisa Zaar (first round)
12. (France) Chloé Paquet (qualifying competition)

=== Qualifiers ===
1. (Armenia) Elina Avanesyan
2. (Germany) Mona Barthel
3. (Germany) Jule Niemeier
4. (Netherlands) Arantxa Rus
5. Elena Pridankina
6. (Argentina) María Lourdes Carlé

=== Qualifying draw ===
==== First qualifier ====
First round
1	(United States) Varvara Lepchenko	6	6
WC	(Germany) Anna Petkovic	2	2
(Slovenia) Dalila Jakupović	2^{r}
9	(Armenia) Elina Avanesyan	4

Qualifying competition
1	(United States) Varvara Lepchenko	6	6^{5}	3
9	(Armenia) Elina Avanesyan	4	7^{7}	6

==== Second qualifier ====
First round
2	(Netherlands) Eva Vedder	4	6	6
(Spain) Georgina García Pérez	6	2	4
Ekaterina Yashina	6	1	1
8	(Germany) Mona Barthel	2	6	6

Qualifying competition
2	(Netherlands) Eva Vedder	6	3	0
8	(Germany) Mona Barthel	4	6	6

==== Third qualifier ====
First round
3	Julia Avdeeva	5	6	4
WC	(Germany) Jule Niemeier	7	2	6
(Estonia) Elena Malygina	6	6
11	(Sweden) Lisa Zaar	2	4

Qualifying competition
WC	(Germany) Jule Niemeier	6	4	6
(Estonia) Elena Malygina	4	6	1

==== Fourth qualifier ====
First round
4	(Netherlands) Arantxa Rus	6	6
Ekaterina Kazionova	4	0
(Ukraine) Valeriya Strakhova	3	6	2
12	(France) Chloé Paquet	6	4	6

Qualifying competition
4	(Netherlands) Arantxa Rus	1	6	6
12	(France) Chloé Paquet	6	4	4

==== Fifth qualifier ====
First round
5	Elena Pridankina	6	6
(France) Diana Martynov	2	4
WC	(Germany) Victoria Brand	6	6
10	(Liechtenstein) Kathinka von Deichmann	3	4

Qualifying competition
5	Elena Pridankina	6	6
WC	(Germany) Victoria Brand	3	3

==== Sixth qualifier ====
First round
6	(France) Carole Monnet	3	1^{r}
(Italy) Jessica Pieri	6	3
WC	(Germany) Emily Eigelsbach	1	1
7	(Argentina) María Lourdes Carlé	6	6

Qualifying competition
(Italy) Jessica Pieri	6	1	1
7	(Argentina) María Lourdes Carlé	0	6	6
