= 2014 International German Open – Doubles =

Doubles
- 2014 International German Open

Final
- Champions: (Croatia) Marin Draganja (Romania) Florin Mergea
- Runners-up: (Austria) Alexander Peya (Brazil) Bruno Soares
- Score: 6–4, 7–5

Details
- Draw: 16
- Seeds: 4

Events
Singles	Doubles
- International German Open

Mariusz Fyrstenberg and Marcin Matkowski were the defending champions, but lost to David Marrero and Fernando Verdasco in the first round.
Marin Draganja and Florin Mergea won the title, defeating Alexander Peya and Bruno Soares in the final, 6–4, 7–5.

== Seeds ==
1. (Austria) Alexander Peya / (Brazil) Bruno Soares (final)
2. (Spain) David Marrero / (Spain) Fernando Verdasco (quarterfinals)
3. (Spain) Marcel Granollers / (Spain) Marc López (semifinals)
4. (United Kingdom) Jamie Murray / (Australia) John Peers (semifinals)

== Draw ==
Key

- Q = Qualifier
- WC = Wild card
- LL = Lucky loser
- Alt = Alternate
- ITF = ITF entry
- PR = Protected ranking
- SR = Special ranking
- SE = Special exempt
- JE = Junior exempt
- JR = Junior Accelerator Programme entrant
- CO = College Accelerator Programme entrant
- NG = Next Gen Accelerator Program entrant
- w/o = Walkover
- r = Retired
- d = Defaulted

=== Draw ===
First round
1	(Austria) A Peya (Brazil) B Soares	6	6
Q	(Kazakhstan) M Kukushkin (Germany) P Marx	2	2
(Austria) O Marach (France) G Simon	2	3
(United Kingdom) C Fleming (Austria) J Knowle	6	6
3	(Spain) M Granollers (Spain) M López	7^{7}	6
WC	(Germany) A Begemann (Germany) A Zverev	6^{4}	4
(Uruguay) P Cuevas (Italy) F Fognini	3	2
LL	(Argentina) F Bagnis (Argentina) DS Schwartzman	6	6
(Spain) G García-López (Austria) P Oswald	6	4	[11]
(Argentina) F Delbonis (Portugal) J Sousa	3	6	[9]
WC	(Germany) M Emmrich (Germany) C Kas	3	4
4	(United Kingdom) J Murray (Australia) J Peers	6	6
(Croatia) M Draganja (Romania) F Mergea	7^{7}	6^{4}	[10]
(Argentina) C Berlocq (Italy) A Seppi	6^{5}	7^{7}	[8]
(Poland) M Fyrstenberg (Poland) M Matkowski	3	3
2	(Spain) D Marrero (Spain) F Verdasco	6	6

Quarterfinals
1	(Austria) A Peya (Brazil) B Soares	6	6^{4}	[11]
(United Kingdom) C Fleming (Austria) J Knowle	0	7^{7}	[9]
3	(Spain) M Granollers (Spain) M López	6	6
LL	(Argentina) F Bagnis (Argentina) DS Schwartzman	3	3
(Spain) G García-López (Austria) P Oswald	6^{6}	5
4	(United Kingdom) J Murray (Australia) J Peers	7^{8}	7
(Croatia) M Draganja (Romania) F Mergea	7^{8}	4	[12]
2	(Spain) D Marrero (Spain) F Verdasco	6^{6}	6	[10]

Semifinals
1	(Austria) A Peya (Brazil) B Soares	6	6
3	(Spain) M Granollers (Spain) M López	3	4
4	(United Kingdom) J Murray (Australia) J Peers	1	3
(Croatia) M Draganja (Romania) F Mergea	6	6

Final
1	(Austria) A Peya (Brazil) B Soares	4	5
(Croatia) M Draganja (Romania) F Mergea	6	7

== Qualifying ==
=== Seeds ===
1. (Australia) Paul Hanley / (United Kingdom) Jonathan Marray (first round)
2. (Kazakhstan) Mikhail Kukushkin / (Germany) Philipp Marx (qualified)

=== Qualifiers ===
1. (Kazakhstan) Mikhail Kukushkin / (Germany) Philipp Marx

=== Lucky losers ===
1. (Argentina) Facundo Bagnis / (Argentina) Diego Sebastián Schwartzman

=== Qualifying draw ===
First round
1	(Australia) Paul Hanley (United Kingdom) Jonathan Marray	4	4
(Germany) Tobias Kamke (Germany) Julian Reister	6	6
(Argentina) Facundo Bagnis (Argentina) Diego Sebastián Schwartzman	3	7	[8]
2	(Kazakhstan) Mikhail Kukushkin (Germany) Philipp Marx	6	5	[10]

Qualifying competition
(Germany) Tobias Kamke (Germany) Julian Reister	3	6^{5}
2	(Kazakhstan) Mikhail Kukushkin (Germany) Philipp Marx	6	7^{7}
