= 2014 International German Open – Singles =

Singles
- 2014 International German Open

Final
- Champion: (Argentina) Leonardo Mayer
- Runner-up: (Spain) David Ferrer
- Score: 6–7^{(3–7)}, 6–1, 7–6^{(7–4)}

Details
- Draw: 48
- Seeds: 16

Events
Singles	Doubles
- International German Open

Fabio Fognini was the defending singles champion, but lost to Filip Krajinović in the second round.
Unseeded Leonardo Mayer won the title, defeating David Ferrer in the final, 6–7^{(3–7)}, 6–1, 7–6^{(7–4)}.

== Seeds ==
All seeds receive a bye into the second round.

1. (Spain) David Ferrer (final)
2. (Italy) Fabio Fognini (second round)
3. (Spain) Tommy Robredo (third round)
4. (Ukraine) Alexandr Dolgopolov (third round)
5. (Russia) Mikhail Youzhny (second round)
6. (Spain) Roberto Bautista Agut (withdrew)
7. (Germany) Philipp Kohlschreiber (semifinals)
8. (Spain) Marcel Granollers (second round)
9. (Spain) Fernando Verdasco (second round)
10. (Spain) Guillermo García López (second round)
11. (Colombia) Santiago Giraldo (third round)
12. (France) Gilles Simon (third round)
13. (Argentina) Federico Delbonis (second round)
14. (Portugal) João Sousa (second round)
15. (Argentina) Carlos Berlocq (second round)
16. (Italy) Andreas Seppi (second round)

Click on the seed number of a player to go to their draw section.

== Draw ==
Key

- Q = Qualifier
- WC = Wild card
- LL = Lucky loser
- Alt = Alternate
- ITF = ITF entry
- PR = Protected ranking
- SR = Special ranking
- SE = Special exempt
- JE = Junior exempt
- JR = Junior Accelerator Programme entrant
- CO = College Accelerator Programme entrant
- NG = Next Gen Accelerator Program entrant
- w/o = Walkover
- r = Retired
- d = Defaulted

=== Finals ===
Quarterfinals
1/WC	(Spain) David Ferrer	6	6
(Spain) Pablo Andújar	0	2
WC	(Germany) Tobias Kamke	6	5	3
WC	(Germany) Alexander Zverev	0	7	6
7	(Germany) Philipp Kohlschreiber	6	6
(Czech Republic) Lukáš Rosol	4	4
(Argentina) Leonardo Mayer	6	7
(Serbia) Dušan Lajović	1	5

Semifinals
1/WC	(Spain) David Ferrer	6	6
WC	(Germany) Alexander Zverev	0	1
7	(Germany) Philipp Kohlschreiber	5	4
(Argentina) Leonardo Mayer	7	6

Final
1/WC	(Spain) David Ferrer	7^{7}	1	6^{4}
(Argentina) Leonardo Mayer	6^{3}	6	7^{7}

=== Top half ===
==== Section 1 ====
First round
(Kazakhstan) M Kukushkin	6	6
Q	(Turkey) M İlhan	2	2
(Spain) P Riba	3	1
(Argentina) J Mónaco	6	6
(Spain) P Carreño Busta	6^{5}	3
(Germany) D Brown	7^{7}	6
Q	(Croatia) M Delić	4	2
(Spain) P Andújar	6	6

Second round
1/WC	(Spain) D Ferrer	2	6	6
(Kazakhstan) M Kukushkin	6	3	2
(Argentina) J Mónaco	6	0	6^{3}
16	(Italy) A Seppi	1	6	7^{7}
9	(Spain) F Verdasco	6	2	6^{8}
(Germany) D Brown	4	6	7^{10}
(Spain) P Andújar	6	3	6
LL	(Brazil) T Bellucci	4	6	2

Third round
1/WC	(Spain) D Ferrer	6	3	6
16	(Italy) A Seppi	3	6	3
(Germany) D Brown	1	2
(Spain) P Andújar	6	6

Quarterfinals
1/WC	(Spain) D Ferrer	6	6
(Spain) P Andújar	0	2

==== Section 2 ====
First round
(Poland) J Janowicz	6	7
Q	(Spain) A Ramos Viñolas	0	5
WC	(Germany) T Kamke	6	4	6
(Finland) J Nieminen	3	6	2
(Kazakhstan) A Golubev	6	1	6^{4}
(France) B Paire	1	6	7^{7}
WC	(Germany) A Zverev	6	6
(Netherlands) R Haase	0	2

Second round
4	(Ukraine) A Dolgopolov	6	6
(Poland) J Janowicz	4	1
WC	(Germany) T Kamke	6	6
13	(Argentina) F Delbonis	3	4
11	(Colombia) S Giraldo	7^{8}	6
(France) B Paire	6^{6}	2
WC	(Germany) A Zverev	7	7
5	(Russia) M Youzhny	5	5

Third round
4	(Ukraine) A Dolgopolov	5	6	5
WC	(Germany) T Kamke	7	2	7
11	(Colombia) S Giraldo	4	6^{6}
WC	(Germany) A Zverev	6	7^{8}

Quarterfinals
WC	(Germany) T Kamke	6	5	3
WC	(Germany) A Zverev	0	7	6

=== Bottom half ===
==== Section 3 ====
First round
Q	(Portugal) G Elias	6	6
(Spain) A Montañés	4	3
(Netherlands) I Sijsling	4	6	0
(Slovakia) M Kližan	6	3	6
WC	(Germany) J Reister	4	1^{r}
(Czech Republic) L Rosol	6	2
Q	(Spain) D Gimeno Traver	6	6
(Russia) T Gabashvili	2	3

Second round
7	(Germany) P Kohlschreiber	7	6
Q	(Portugal) G Elias	5	1
(Slovakia) M Kližan
12	(France) G Simon	w/o
14	(Portugal) J Sousa	2	4
(Czech Republic) L Rosol	6	6
Q	(Spain) D Gimeno Traver	2	5
3	(Spain) T Robredo	6	7

Third round
7	(Germany) P Kohlschreiber	7	6
12	(France) G Simon	5	3
(Czech Republic) L Rosol	7	7^{8}
3	(Spain) T Robredo	5	6^{6}

Quarterfinals
7	(Germany) P Kohlschreiber	6	6
(Czech Republic) L Rosol	4	4

==== Section 4 ====
First round
(Czech Republic) J Veselý	5	0
(Austria) D Thiem	7	6
WC	(Germany) P Gojowczyk	3	2
(Argentina) L Mayer	6	6
(Serbia) D Lajović	6	6
(France) K de Schepper	3	2
Q	(Serbia) F Krajinović	1	7	6
(Germany) J-L Struff	6	5	2

Second round
8	(Spain) M Granollers	6	3	5
(Austria) D Thiem	2	6	7
(Argentina) L Mayer	7^{7}	7^{7}
10	(Spain) G García López	6^{1}	6^{3}
15	(Argentina) C Berlocq	3	4
(Serbia) D Lajović	6	6
Q	(Serbia) F Krajinović	6	6
2	(Italy) F Fognini	4	0

Third round
(Austria) D Thiem	3	2
(Argentina) L Mayer	6	6
(Serbia) D Lajović	3
Q	(Serbia) F Krajinović	1^{r}

Quarterfinals
(Argentina) L Mayer	6	7
(Serbia) D Lajović	1	5

== Qualifying ==
=== Seeds ===
1. (Spain) Albert Ramos Viñolas (qualified)
2. (Brazil) Thomaz Bellucci (qualifying competition, Lucky loser)
3. (Spain) Daniel Gimeno Traver (qualified)
4. (Argentina) Diego Sebastián Schwartzman (qualifying competition)
5. (Russia) Andrey Kuznetsov (qualifying competition)
6. (Argentina) Facundo Bagnis (qualifying competition)
7. (Italy) Marco Cecchinato (qualifying competition)
8. (Turkey) Marsel İlhan (qualified)
9. (Austria) Gerald Melzer (qualifying competition)
10. (Portugal) Gastão Elias (qualified)
11. (Serbia) Filip Krajinović (qualified)
12. (Croatia) Mate Delić (qualified)

=== Qualifiers ===
1. (Spain) Albert Ramos Viñolas
2. (Serbia) Filip Krajinović
3. (Spain) Daniel Gimeno Traver
4. (Turkey) Marsel İlhan
5. (Portugal) Gastão Elias
6. (Croatia) Mate Delić

=== Lucky losers ===
1. (Brazil) Thomaz Bellucci

=== Qualifying draw ===
==== First qualifier ====
First round
1	(Spain) Albert Ramos Viñolas	6	6
(Germany) Tobias Hinzmann	1	1
WC	(Germany) Lukas Rüpke	6	1	0
7	(Italy) Marco Cecchinato	2	6	6

Qualifying competition
1	(Spain) Albert Ramos Viñolas	6	7^{7}
7	(Italy) Marco Cecchinato	1	6^{3}

==== Second qualifier ====
First round
2	(Brazil) Thomaz Bellucci	6	6
WC	(Germany) Tim Nekic	2	1
(Switzerland) Michael Lammer	3	4
11	(Serbia) Filip Krajinović	6	6

Qualifying competition
2	(Brazil) Thomaz Bellucci	3	2
11	(Serbia) Filip Krajinović	6	6

==== Third qualifier ====
First round
3	(Spain) Daniel Gimeno Traver	6	6
(Germany) Nico Matic	4	2
(Argentina) Renzo Olivo	7^{7}	4	6^{4}
9	(Austria) Gerald Melzer	6^{4}	6	7^{7}

Qualifying competition
3	(Spain) Daniel Gimeno Traver	6	7^{7}
9	(Austria) Gerald Melzer	4	6^{3}

==== Fourth qualifier ====
First round
4	(Argentina) Diego Sebastián Schwartzman	6	6
(Brazil) Thiago Monteiro	2	2
WC	(Germany) Demian Raab	4	4
8	(Turkey) Marsel İlhan	6	6

Qualifying competition
4	(Argentina) Diego Sebastián Schwartzman	6^{6}	5
8	(Turkey) Marsel İlhan	7^{8}	7

==== Fifth qualifier ====
First round
5	(Russia) Andrey Kuznetsov	6	6
(Germany) Robin Kern	4	1
(Germany) Kevin Krawietz	6^{6}	2
10	(Portugal) Gastão Elias	7^{8}	6

Qualifying competition
5	(Russia) Andrey Kuznetsov	6	6^{2}	3
10	(Portugal) Gastão Elias	2	7^{7}	6

==== Sixth qualifier ====
First round
6	(Argentina) Facundo Bagnis	6	7
(Germany) Florian Barth	3	5
WC	(Germany) Maximilian Marterer	6^{7}	4
12	(Croatia) Mate Delić	7^{9}	6

Qualifying competition
6	(Argentina) Facundo Bagnis	6	4	1
12	(Croatia) Mate Delić	3	6	6
