= 2026 Hamburg Open – Women's doubles =

Women's doubles
- 2026 Hamburg Open

Final
- Champions: (Slovenia) Dalila Jakupović (Slovenia) Nika Radišić
- Runners-up: (Belgium) Magali Kempen; Alexandra Panova
- Score: 5–7, 6–3, [10–5]
- Date: 26 July 2026

Details
- Draw: 16
- Seeds: 4

Events
| Singles | men | women |
| Doubles | men | women |
- Hamburg Open

Dalila Jakupović and Nika Radišić defeated Magali Kempen and Alexandra Panova in the final, 5–7, 6–3, [10–5] to win the women's doubles tennis title at the 2026 Hamburg Open.

Nadiia Kichenok and Makoto Ninomiya were the reigning champions, but chose to compete separately in Prague instead.

== Seeds ==
1. (Belgium) Magali Kempen / Alexandra Panova (final)
2. (Czech Republic) Jesika Malečková / (Czech Republic) Miriam Škoch (quarterfinals)
3. (Czech Republic) Anastasia Dețiuc / Irina Khromacheva (semifinals)
4. Maria Kozyreva / Elena Pridankina (quarterfinals)

== Draw ==
Key

- Q = Qualifier
- WC = Wild card
- LL = Lucky loser
- Alt = Alternate
- ITF = ITF entry
- PR = Protected ranking
- SR = Special ranking
- SE = Special exempt
- JE = Junior exempt
- JR = Junior Accelerator Programme entrant
- CO = College Accelerator Programme entrant
- NG = Next Gen Accelerator Program entrant
- w/o = Walkover
- r = Retired
- d = Defaulted

First round
1 | (Belgium) M Kempen; A Panova | 6 | 6
(India) R Bhosale (Chinese Taipei) Y-y Li | 2 | 1
PR | (Sweden) L Zaar (Belgium) K Zimmermann | w/o
WC | (Germany) T Brockmann (Austria) S Kraus
3 | (Czech Republic) A Dețiuc; I Khromacheva | 6 | 6
(United Kingdom) M Brooks (Netherlands) I Haverlag | 3 | 0
WC | (Germany) N Schunk (Germany) J Stusek | 4 | 6 | [10]
(Spain) L Romero Gormaz (Spain) S Sorribes Tormo | 6 | 4 | [6]
(Slovenia) D Jakupović (Slovenia) N Radišić | 6 | 6
(Spain) Y Cavallé Reimers (Belgium) L Salden | 3 | 4
PR | (Argentina) N Podoroska (Japan) M Uchijima | 5 | 2
4 | M Kozyreva; E Pridankina | 7 | 6
(Germany) T Korpatsch (Germany) N Noha Akugue | 3 | 3
(Kazakhstan) Z Kulambayeva (Latvia) D Semeņistaja | 6 | 6
(Romania) I Bara (Switzerland) N Karamoko | 6 | 0 | [3]
2 | (Czech Republic) J Malečková (Czech Republic) M Škoch | 2 | 6 | [10]

Quarterfinals
1 | (Belgium) M Kempen; A Panova | 6 | 6
PR | (Sweden) L Zaar (Belgium) K Zimmermann | 1 | 0
3 | (Czech Republic) A Dețiuc; I Khromacheva | 6 | 6
WC | (Germany) N Schunk (Germany) J Stusek | 1 | 1
(Slovenia) D Jakupović (Slovenia) N Radišić | 6 | 6
4 | M Kozyreva; E Pridankina | 4 | 3
(Kazakhstan) Z Kulambayeva (Latvia) D Semeņistaja | 6 | 7
2 | (Czech Republic) J Malečková (Czech Republic) M Škoch | 4 | 5

Semifinals
1 | (Belgium) M Kempen; A Panova | 6 | 6
3 | (Czech Republic) A Dețiuc; I Khromacheva | 4 | 3
(Slovenia) D Jakupović (Slovenia) N Radišić | 6 | 6
(Kazakhstan) Z Kulambayeva (Latvia) D Semeņistaja | 2 | 1

Finals
1 | (Belgium) M Kempen; A Panova | 7 | 3 | [5]
(Slovenia) D Jakupović (Slovenia) N Radišić | 5 | 6 | [10]
