= 2026 Hamburg Open =

- Date: 17–23 May (men); 20–26 July (women)
- Edition: 120th (men); 24th (women)
- Category: ATP 500 (men); WTA 250 (women)
- Draw: 32S / 16D
- Prize money: €2,219,670 (men) €246,388 (women)
- Surface: Clay
- Location: Hamburg, Germany
- Venue: Am Rothenbaum

Champions

Men's singles
- (Peru) Ignacio Buse

Women's singles
- (Germany) Tamara Korpatsch

Men's doubles
- (Germany) Kevin Krawietz / (Germany) Tim Pütz

Women's doubles
- (Slovenia) Dalila Jakupović / (Slovenia) Nika Radišić
- Hamburg Open

The 2026 Hamburg Open was a combined men's and women's tennis tournament played on outdoor clay courts. It was the 120th edition of the event for the men and the 24th edition for the women. The event was classified as an ATP Tour 500 tournament on the 2026 ATP Tour and as a WTA 250 tournament on the 2026 WTA Tour. It took place at Am Rothenbaum in Hamburg, Germany between 17 and 23 May 2026 for the men, and between 20 and 26 July 2026 for the women.

== Champions ==
=== Men's singles ===
- (Peru) Ignacio Buse def. (United States) Tommy Paul, 7–6^{(8–6)}, 4–6, 6–3

=== Women's singles ===
- (Germany) Tamara Korpatsch def. (Hungary) Anna Bondár, 6–3, 6–3

=== Men's doubles ===
- (Germany) Kevin Krawietz / (Germany) Tim Pütz def. (France) Sadio Doumbia / (France) Fabien Reboul, 6–3, 4–6, [10–8]

=== Women's doubles ===
- (Slovenia) Dalila Jakupović / (Slovenia) Nika Radišić def. (Belgium) Magali Kempen / Alexandra Panova, 5–7, 6–3, [10–5]

== ATP singles main draw entrants ==
=== Seeds ===
Country	Player	Rank	Seed
CAN	Félix Auger-Aliassime	5	1
USA	Ben Shelton	6	2
AUS	Alex de Minaur	8	3
ITA	Flavio Cobolli	12	4
	Karen Khachanov	15	5
USA	Tommy Paul	18	6
ITA	Luciano Darderi	20	7
USA	Frances Tiafoe	22	8

- Rankings are as of 4 May 2026.

=== Other entrants ===
The following players received wildcards into the main draw:

- (Germany) Diego Dedura
- (Germany) Justin Engel
- (Germany) Jan-Lennard Struff

The following player received a late entry into the main draw:

- (Australia) Alex de Minaur

The following players received entry from the qualifying draw:

- (Peru) Ignacio Buse
- (France) Arthur Géa
- (Australia) Rinky Hijikata
- (Germany) Max Schönhaus

The following players received entry as lucky losers:

- (United States) Marcos Giron
- (United States) Aleksandar Kovacevic
- (France) Hugo Gaston

=== Withdrawals ===
- (United Kingdom) Jack Draper → replaced by (France) Térence Atmane
- (Brazil) João Fonseca → replaced by (United States) Marcos Giron
- (Serbia) Miomir Kecmanović → replaced by (France) Hugo Gaston
- (Czech Republic) Jiří Lehečka → replaced by (Argentina) Camilo Ugo Carabelli
- (Italy) Lorenzo Musetti → replaced by (Germany) Daniel Altmaier
- (United States) Brandon Nakashima → replaced by (Argentina) Román Andrés Burruchaga
- (Denmark) Holger Rune → replaced by (United States) Ethan Quinn
- (Canada) Denis Shapovalov → replaced by (Germany) Yannick Hanfmann
- (Monaco) Valentin Vacherot → replaced by (United States) Aleksandar Kovacevic
- (Germany) Alexander Zverev → replaced by (Australia) Alex de Minaur

== ATP doubles main draw entrants ==
=== Seeds ===
Country	Player	Country	Player	Rank	Seed
GBR	Julian Cash	GBR	Lloyd Glasspool	13	1
USA	Christian Harrison	GBR	Neal Skupski	13	2
GER	Kevin Krawietz	GER	Tim Pütz	24	3
ITA	Simone Bolelli	ITA	Andrea Vavassori	29	4

- Rankings are as of 4 May 2026.

=== Other entrants ===
The following pairs received wildcards into the doubles main draw:

- (Germany) Hendrik Jebens / (Germany) Tim Rühl
- (Germany) Jakob Schnaitter / (Germany) Mark Wallner

The following pair received entry from the qualifying draw:

- (Brazil) Fernando Romboli / (United States) Ryan Seggerman

== WTA singles main draw entrants ==
=== Seeds ===
Country	Player	Rank	Seed
UKR	Oleksandra Oliynykova	52	1
UKR	Anhelina Kalinina	59	2
HUN	Panna Udvardy	71	3
HUN	Anna Bondár	73	4
GER	Tamara Korpatsch	75	5
SUI	Simona Waltert	81	6
KAZ	Yulia Putintseva	82	7
AUT	Sinja Kraus	94	8

- Rankings are as of 13 July 2026.

=== Other entrants ===
The following players received wildcards into the main draw:

- (Germany) Tessa Brockmann
- (Germany) Nastasja Schunk
- (Germany) Valentina Steiner
- (Germany) Julia Stusek

The following players received entry using a protected ranking:

- (Argentina) Nadia Podoroska
- (Spain) Sara Sorribes Tormo

The following players received entry from the qualifying draw:

- (Armenia) Elina Avanesyan
- (Germany) Mona Barthel
- (Argentina) María Lourdes Carlé
- (Germany) Jule Niemeier
- Elena Pridankina
- (Netherlands) Arantxa Rus

=== Withdrawals ===
- (Colombia) Emiliana Arango → replaced by (Poland) Katarzyna Kawa
- (Spain) Cristina Bucșa → replaced by (Spain) Kaitlin Quevedo
- (Poland) Maja Chwalińska → replaced by (Japan) Moyuka Uchijima
- (Romania) Jaqueline Cristian → replaced by (Argentina) Nadia Podoroska
- (Switzerland) Viktorija Golubic → replaced by (Andorra) Victoria Jiménez Kasintseva
- (Montenegro) Danka Kovinić → replaced by (Spain) Leyre Romero Gormaz
- (Romania) Elena-Gabriela Ruse → replaced by (Armenia) Alina Charaeva
- (Ukraine) Yuliia Starodubtseva → replaced by (Spain) Paula Badosa
- (Switzerland) Jil Teichmann → replaced by (Germany) Noma Noha Akugue

== WTA doubles main draw entrants ==
=== Seeds ===
Country	Player	Country	Player	Rank	Seed
BEL	Magali Kempen		Alexandra Panova	90	1
CZE	Jesika Malečková	CZE	Miriam Škoch	105	2
CZE	Anastasia Dețiuc		Irina Khromacheva	114	3
	Maria Kozyreva		Elena Pridankina	133	4

- Rankings are as of 13 July 2026.

=== Other entrants ===
The following pair received a wildcard into the doubles main draw:

- ~~(Germany) Tessa Johanna Brockmann / (Austria) Sinja Kraus~~
- (Germany) Nastasja Schunk / (Germany) Julia Stusek

=== Withdrawals ===
- (Germany) Tessa Johanna Brockmann / (Austria) Sinja Kraus → not replaced
