= 2018 German Open – Singles =

Singles
- 2018 German Open

Final
- Champion: (Georgia (country)) Nikoloz Basilashvili
- Runner-up: (Argentina) Leonardo Mayer
- Score: 6–4, 0–6, 7–5

Details
- Draw: 32
- Seeds: 8

Events
Singles	Doubles
- German Open Tennis Championships

Leonardo Mayer was the defending champion, but lost in the final to Nikoloz Basilashvili, 4–6, 6–0, 5–7. This was Basilashvili's first ATP World Tour title, as well as the first ATP title won by a Georgian player since Alexander Metreveli.

== Seeds ==
1. (Austria) Dominic Thiem (quarterfinals)
2. (Argentina) Diego Schwartzman (quarterfinals)
3. (Spain) Pablo Carreño Busta (quarterfinals)
4. (Bosnia and Herzegovina) Damir Džumhur (first round)
5. (Germany) Philipp Kohlschreiber (first round)
6. (Italy) Marco Cecchinato (first round)
7. (France) Richard Gasquet (second round, withdrew)
8. (Spain) Fernando Verdasco (second round)

== Draw ==
Key

- Q = Qualifier
- WC = Wild card
- LL = Lucky loser
- Alt = Alternate
- ITF = ITF entry
- PR = Protected ranking
- SR = Special ranking
- SE = Special exempt
- JE = Junior exempt
- JR = Junior Accelerator Programme entrant
- CO = College Accelerator Programme entrant
- NG = Next Gen Accelerator Program entrant
- w/o = Walkover
- r = Retired
- d = Defaulted

=== Finals ===
Semifinals
(Chile) Nicolás Jarry	5	6	1
Q	(Georgia (country)) Nikoloz Basilashvili	7	0	6
Q	(Slovakia) Jozef Kovalík	7^{8}	4	6^{7}
(Argentina) Leonardo Mayer	6^{6}	6	7^{9}

Final
Q	(Georgia (country)) Nikoloz Basilashvili	6	0	7
(Argentina) Leonardo Mayer	4	6	5

=== Top half ===
First round
1	(Austria) D Thiem	6	6
Q	(France) C Moutet	4	2
(Australia) J Millman	7	6
(Germany) J-L Struff	5	3
(Chile) N Jarry	6	6
(Germany) P Gojowczyk	1	2
(France) B Paire	5	3
7	(France) R Gasquet	7	6
3	(Spain) P Carreño Busta	2	6	7^{7}
WC	(Germany) F Mayer	6	1	6^{4}
(Slovenia) A Bedene	6	1	6
SE	(Switzerland) H Laaksonen	3	6	4
(Hungary) M Fucsovics	3	2
(Uruguay) P Cuevas	6	6
Q	(Georgia (country)) N Basilashvili	7	1	6
5	(Germany) P Kohlschreiber	5	6	4

Second round
1	(Austria) D Thiem	6	6
(Australia) J Millman	2	2
(Chile) N Jarry	w/o
7	(France) R Gasquet
3	(Spain) P Carreño Busta	6	4
(Slovenia) A Bedene	2	0^{r}
(Uruguay) P Cuevas	6^{6}	4
Q	(Georgia (country)) N Basilashvili	7^{8}	6

Quarterfinals
1	(Austria) D Thiem	6^{5}	6^{7}
(Chile) N Jarry	7^{7}	7^{9}
3	(Spain) P Carreño Busta	6^{3}	4
Q	(Georgia (country)) N Basilashvili	7^{7}	6

Semifinals
(Chile) N Jarry	5	6	1
Q	(Georgia (country)) N Basilashvili	7	0	6

=== Bottom half ===
First round
8	(Spain) F Verdasco	6	4	7^{7}
(Serbia) D Lajović	3	6	6^{5}
(France) G Simon	6^{2}	2
LL	(Brazil) T Monteiro	7^{7}	6
(Spain) D Ferrer	5	7	3
WC	(Germany) R Molleker	7	5	6
Q	(Slovakia) J Kovalík	6	6
4	(Bosnia and Herzegovina) D Džumhur	2	4
6	(Italy) M Cecchinato	4	6	4
(France) G Monfils	6	3	6
(Argentina) L Mayer	6	6
(Spain) A Ramos Viñolas	3	2
Q	(Germany) D Masur	6	6
(Germany) M Marterer	3	4
WC	(Norway) C Ruud	4	6	2
2	(Argentina) D Schwartzman	6	2	6

Second round
8	(Spain) F Verdasco	6	2	5
LL	(Brazil) T Monteiro	3	6	7
WC	(Germany) R Molleker	4	0
Q	(Slovakia) J Kovalík	6	6
(France) G Monfils	1	5
(Argentina) L Mayer	6	7
Q	(Germany) D Masur	2	2
2	(Argentina) D Schwartzman	6	6

Quarterfinals
LL	(Brazil) T Monteiro	6	3	2
Q	(Slovakia) J Kovalík	3	6	6
(Argentina) L Mayer	6	4	6
2	(Argentina) D Schwartzman	3	6	3

Semifinals
Q	(Slovakia) J Kovalík	7^{8}	4	6^{7}
(Argentina) L Mayer	6^{6}	6	7^{9}

== Qualifying ==
=== Seeds ===
1. (Georgia (country)) Nikoloz Basilashvili (qualified)
2. (Slovakia) Jozef Kovalík (qualified)
3. (France) Corentin Moutet (qualified)
4. (Italy) Lorenzo Sonego (first round)
5. (Slovakia) Martin Kližan (first round)
6. (Brazil) Thiago Monteiro (qualifying competition, Lucky loser)
7. (France) Calvin Hemery (first round)
8. (Argentina) Carlos Berlocq (first round)

=== Qualifiers ===
1. (Georgia (country)) Nikoloz Basilashvili
2. (Slovakia) Jozef Kovalík
3. (France) Corentin Moutet
4. (Germany) Daniel Masur

=== Lucky loser ===
1. (Brazil) Thiago Monteiro

=== Qualifying draw ===
==== First qualifier ====
First round
1	(Georgia (country)) Nikoloz Basilashvili	7	6
(Germany) Tobias Kamke	5	2
PR	(Austria) Jürgen Melzer	6	6
5	(Slovakia) Martin Kližan	3	4

Qualifying competition
1	(Georgia (country)) Nikoloz Basilashvili	6	4	7
PR	(Austria) Jürgen Melzer	4	6	5

==== Second qualifier ====
First round
2	(Slovakia) Jozef Kovalík	6	6
WC	(Germany) Niklas Guttau	0	1
(Ecuador) Roberto Quiroz	4	3
6	(Brazil) Thiago Monteiro	6	6

Qualifying competition
2	(Slovakia) Jozef Kovalík	6	3	6
6	(Brazil) Thiago Monteiro	3	6	0

==== Third qualifier ====
First round
3	(France) Corentin Moutet	6	6
WC	(Germany) Marvin Möller	2	3
(Serbia) Danilo Petrović	5	7^{7}	7
7	(France) Calvin Hemery	7	6^{4}	5

Qualifying competition
3	(France) Corentin Moutet	6	6
(Serbia) Danilo Petrović	4	4

==== Fourth qualifier ====
First round
4	(Italy) Lorenzo Sonego	6	1	6^{3}
Alt	(Argentina) Renzo Olivo	3	6	7^{7}
WC	(Germany) Daniel Masur	7^{7}	4	6
8	(Argentina) Carlos Berlocq	6^{4}	6	3

Qualifying competition
Alt	(Argentina) Renzo Olivo	6	5	5
WC	(Germany) Daniel Masur	4	7	7
