= Hamburg Open =

Annual tennis tournament in Hamburg

Coordinates: 53°34′25″N 9°59′29″E

Tournament information
- Event name: Bitpanda Hamburg Open (ATP since 2025), MSC Hamburg Ladies Open (WTA since 2025), ECE Ladies Hamburg Open (2024)
- Founded: 1892; 134 years ago (men); 2021; 5 years ago (women)
- Editions: 119 (2025)
- Location: Hamburg; Germany
- Venue: Am Rothenbaum (since 1924)
- Surface: Clay – outdoors
- Draw: 32S / 24Q / 16D
- Website: ATP Hamburg Open; WTA Hamburg Open

Current champions (2026)
- Men's singles: (Peru) Ignacio Buse
- Women's singles: (Germany) Tamara Korpatsch
- Men's doubles: (Germany) Kevin Krawietz (Germany) Tim Putz
- Women's doubles: (Slovenia) Dalila Jakupović (Slovenia) Nika Radišić
ATP Tour
- Category: ATP Tour 500 (since 2009); ATP Super 9 / ATP Masters Series (1990–2008); Grand Prix tennis circuit (1971–1989)
- Prize money: €2,219,670 (2026)
WTA Tour
- Category: WTA 250 (2021–2023, 2025–), WTA 125 (2024)
- Prize money: €246,388 (2026)

The Hamburg Open (formerly German Open Tennis Championships) is an annual tennis tournament for professional players held in Hamburg, Germany and part of the Association of Tennis Professionals (ATP) Tour and the Women's Tennis Association (WTA). It is the fifth oldest tennis tournament in the world.

The tournament is played on outdoor clay courts at the tennis center Am Rothenbaum in the Harvestehude quarter. For much of its history, the tournament was contested in May, as a precursor to the French Open on the professional tennis calendar. Starting with the 2009 tournament, it has been held in July instead.

The women's event was held initially separately from 1982 to 1983 (in Hittfeld), and again from 1987 through to 2002. It was part of the WTA Tour and existed under several different sponsored names, most commonly known as the Citizen Cup (1987–1995) and the Betty Barclay Cup (1999–2002). WTA Hamburg was the location where Monica Seles, then-world No.1, was stabbed during a match by a disorderly local tennis fan on April 30, 1993. In 2021, Hamburg returned to the calendar of the WTA tour, becoming part of its WTA 250 series category of tournaments. In 2024 the tournament was classified as a WTA 125 tournament and the WTA referred to the event as the "ECE Ladies Hamburg Open". In 2025 it returned to its WTA 250 status as the "MSC Hamburg Ladies Open".

== History ==
The inaugural edition was held at the 'Eisenbahnverein auf der Uhlenhorst' (Uhlenhorst Railway Club) and was played in a best-of-three sets format. From the second edition in 1893 onward the tournament was a best-of-five sets until 2007 when it reverted (like other non Grand Slam events) to a best-of-three sets final. The first five editions, from 1892 to 1896, were exclusively open to German and Austrian players.

From 1898 to 1901 the German Championships were held in Bad Homburg vor der Höhe. A men's doubles event was added to the tournament in 1902. In 1924, the tournament permanently moved to the current location in Am Rothenbaum. The German Open was a combined men's and women's tournament up until 1979 when the WTA event was moved to West Berlin.

Since 2019, the tournament logo changed every year, using the trajectory of the ball in the championship point in the previous year's tournament to form the yellow line in the logo.

=== Men's ===
The tournament joined the Grand Prix Tour from 1971 to 1989 with mixed importance. With the creation of the ATP Tour in 1990, the tournament was classed as an ATP Masters Series event up until 2008. In 2009 the tournament was downgraded to an ATP Tour 500 event. According to tournament officials, this seriously hinders its ability to attract top-ranking players, who are more likely to participate in tournaments that earn them more points. Tournament officials sued the ATP in 2007 to stop the downgrade but a US jury decided in 2008 that it did not constitute a breach of monopoly laws. After a court-ordered mediation the tournament saw its appeal to the verdict rejected in 2010.

=== Women's ===
The German Championships were a combined men's and women's tournament held in Hamburg up until the women's event moved to West Berlin in 1979. The women's championships were established in 1896 and held 66 editions with the men's event before the decision to separate the two events.

A new WTA Hamburg tournament was established in 1982, three years after the separation of the men's and women's German Open. This tournament was held the week prior to the men's German Open (whilst the women's German Open was held the week following the men's event in West Berlin). It existed as a lower tier tournament in 1982 and 1983 before a hiatus for three years. It was held in Hittfield. When the tournament then returned in 1987, it was held at Am Rothenbaum in September with German Steffi Graf winning the tournament. The German Open (men's) was held in late April to early May (with the women's event being held in Berlin from 11 May). In 1990 the tournament was promoted to Tier II status which it maintained until 2002 when the tournament was discontinued.

It has been known by various names; the Casino Cup (1982), Fila Europa Cup (1983), Citizen Cup (1987–95), Rexona Cup (1996–97), Intersport Damen Grand Prix (1998), and Betty Barclay Cup (1999–2002). On April 30, 1993, Monica Seles, then-world No.1, was stabbed by a disorderly local tennis fan during a quarterfinal match with Magdalena Maleeva. Seles never played in Germany again after the incident.

Between 2003 and 2020, no tournaments were held in Hamburg. Hamburg returned to the WTA calendar in 2021 after it secured license in the 250 series from the Baltic Open that was previously held in Jūrmala, Latvia.

Steffi Graf holds the record for the most wins at WTA Hamburg, winning it six times consecutively from 1987 to 1992. She also finished runner-up a further two times.

== Finals ==
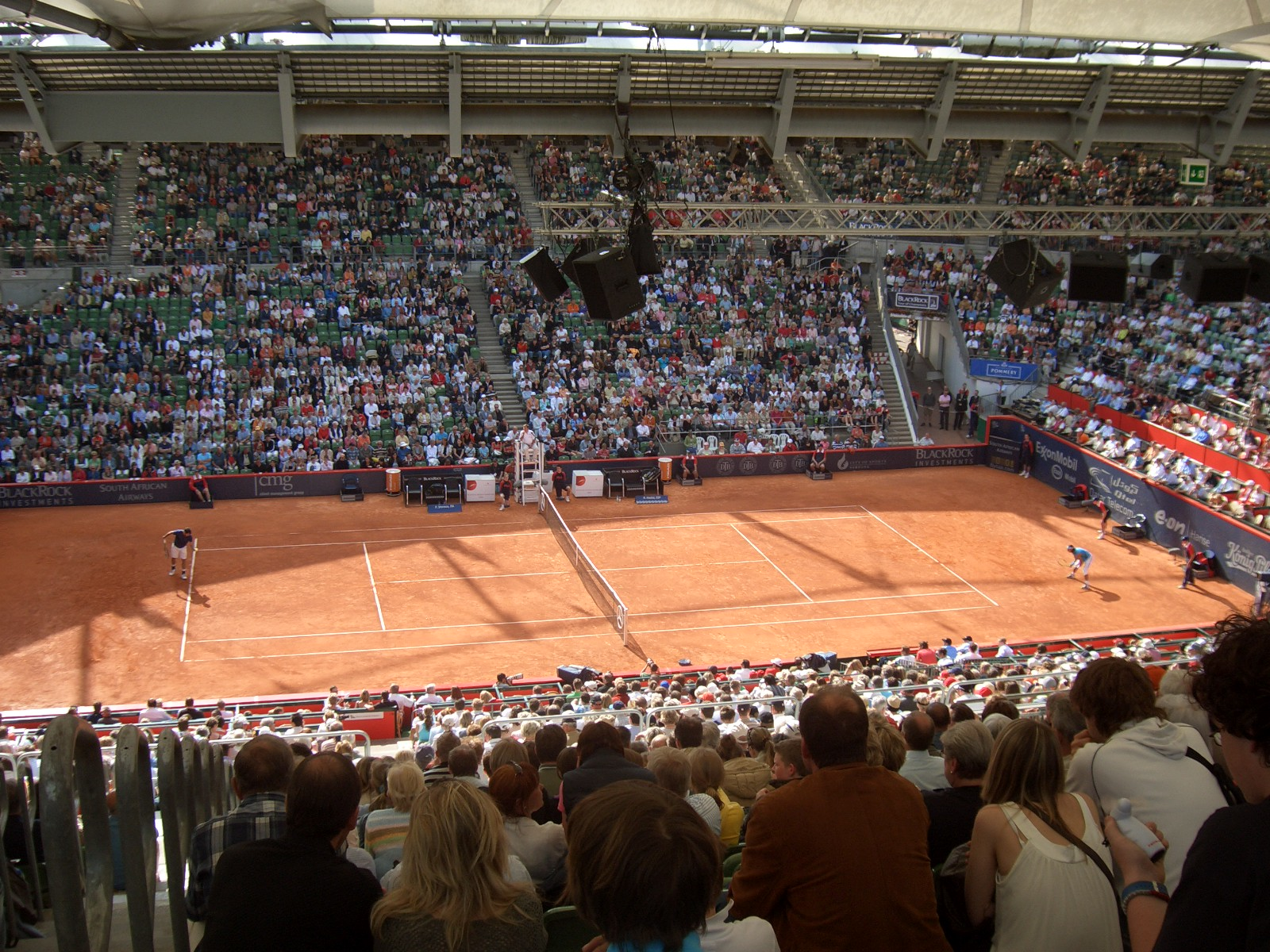
Nadal vs. Starace at the 2008 German Open

=== Men's singles ===
Year	Champions	Runners-up	Score
1892	(German Empire) Walter Bonne	(German Empire) R.A. Leers	7–5, 6–3
1893	(German Empire) Christian Winzer	(German Empire) Walter Bonne	6–4, 6–0, 3–6, 6–3
1894	(German Empire) Victor Voss	(German Empire) Christian Winzer	11–9, 6–1, 6–4
1895	(German Empire) Victor Voss (2)	(German Empire) Christian Winzer	6–2, 6–1, 6–2
1896	(German Empire) Victor Voss (3)	(German Empire) Georg Wantzelius	6–1, 6–0, 6–1
1897	(United Kingdom of Great Britain and Ireland) George Hillyard	(United Kingdom of Great Britain and Ireland) George Ball-Greene	6–1, 6–2, 6–3
1898	(United Kingdom of Great Britain and Ireland) Harold Mahony	(United Kingdom of Great Britain and Ireland) Joshua Pim	6–4, 6–3, 6–4
1899	(United States) Clarence Hobart	(United Kingdom of Great Britain and Ireland) Harold Mahony	8–6, 8–10, 6–0, 6–8, 8–6
1900	(United Kingdom of Great Britain and Ireland) George Hillyard (2)	(United Kingdom of Great Britain and Ireland) Laurence Doherty	walkover
1901	(France) Max Decugis	(United Kingdom of Great Britain and Ireland) Frederick W. Payn	6–4, 6–4, 4–6, 6–2
1902	(France) Max Decugis (2)	(United Kingdom of Great Britain and Ireland) John Flavelle	4–6, 2–6, 7–5, 7–5, 6–0
1903	(United Kingdom of Great Britain and Ireland) Major Ritchie	(France) Max Decugis	walkover
1904	(United Kingdom of Great Britain and Ireland) Major Ritchie (2)	(Austria-Hungary) Kurt von Wessely	6–4, 6–0, 10–8
1905	(United Kingdom of Great Britain and Ireland) Major Ritchie (3)	(New Zealand) Anthony Wilding	8–6, 7–5, 8–6
1906	(United Kingdom of Great Britain and Ireland) Major Ritchie (4)	(German Empire) Friedrich Wilhelm Rahe	6–2, 6–2, 6–0
1907	(German Empire) Otto Froitzheim	(United Kingdom of Great Britain and Ireland) Major Ritchie	7–5, 6–3, 6–4
1908	(United Kingdom of Great Britain and Ireland) Major Ritchie (5)	(United Kingdom of Great Britain and Ireland) George K. Logie	6–1, 6–1, 6–3
1909	(German Empire) Otto Froitzheim (2)	(German Empire) Friedrich Wilhelm Rahe	6–0, 6–2, 6–3
1910	(German Empire) Otto Froitzheim (3)	(German Empire) Kurt Bergmann	walkover
1911	(German Empire) Otto Froitzheim (4)	(Austria-Hungary) Felix Pipes	6–3, 6–2, 6–1
1912	(German Empire) Otto von Müller	(German Empire) Heinrich Schomburgk	2–6, 6–1, 6–4, 6–2
1913	(German Empire) Heinrich Schomburgk	(German Empire) Otto von Müller	6–2, 6–4, 7–5
1914– 1919	Not held		
1920	(Weimar Republic) Oscar Kreuzer	(Weimar Republic) Luis Maria Heyden	6–0, 6–0, 6–2
1921	(Weimar Republic) Otto Froitzheim (5)	(Weimar Republic) Robert Kleinschroth	6–4, 8–6 retired
1922	(Weimar Republic) Otto Froitzheim (6)	(Weimar Republic) Friedrich Wilhelm Rahe	2–6, 6–0, 8–6, 6–1
1923	(Weimar Republic) Heinz Landmann	(Weimar Republic) Luis Maria Heyden	6–2, 6–3, 7–5
1924	(Hungary) Béla von Kehrling	(Weimar Republic) Luis Maria Heyden	8–6, 6–1, 9–7
1925	(Weimar Republic) Otto Froitzheim (7)	(Hungary) Béla von Kehrling	6–4, 6–1, 4–6, 6–1
1926	(Weimar Republic) Hans Moldenhauer	(Weimar Republic) Walter Dessart	6–2, 6–2, 6–1
1927	(Weimar Republic) Hans Moldenhauer (2)	(Weimar Republic) Willy Hannemann	6–2, 4–6, 6–4, 6–4
1928	(Weimar Republic) Daniel Prenn	(Weimar Republic) Hans Moldenhauer	6–1, 6–4, 6–3
1929	(France) Christian Boussus	(Weimar Republic) Otto Froitzheim	6–1, 4–6, 6–1, 6–8, 6–1
1930	(France) Christian Boussus (2)	(Japan) Yoshiro Ohta	1–6, 8–6, 2–6, 6–4, 6–4
1931	(Czechoslovakia) Roderich Menzel	(Weimar Republic) Gustav Jaenecke	6–2, 6–2, 6–1
1932	(Weimar Republic) Gottfried von Cramm	(Czechoslovakia) Roderich Menzel	3–6, 6–2, 6–2, 6–3
1933	(Germany) Gottfried von Cramm (2)	(Czechoslovakia) Roderich Menzel	7–5, 2–6, 4–6, 6–3, 6–4
1934	(Germany) Gottfried von Cramm (3)	(United States) Clayton Lee Burwell	6–2, 6–1, 6–4
1935	(Germany) Gottfried von Cramm (4)	(Hungary) Ottó Szigeti	6–3, 6–3, 6–3
1936	Not held		
1937	(Nazi Germany) Henner Henkel	(Australia) Vivian McGrath	1–6, 6–3, 8–6, 3–6, 6–1
1938	(Hungary) Ottó Szigeti	(France) Bernard Destremau	8–6, 6–8, 6–3, 6–3
1939	(Nazi Germany) Henner Henkel (2)	(Czechoslovakia) Roderich Menzel	4–6, 6–4, 6–0, 6–1
1940– 1947	Not held		
1948	(West Germany) Gottfried von Cramm (5)	(West Germany) Helmut Gulcz	6–4, 6–1, 4–6, 6–3
1949	(West Germany) Gottfried von Cramm (6)	(West Germany) Ernst Buchholz	7–5, 6–1, 6–0
1950	(Egypt) Jaroslav Drobný	(West Germany) Gottfried von Cramm	6–3, 6–4, 6–4
1951	(Sweden) Lennart Bergelin	(Sweden) Sven Davidson	4–6, 6–3, 4–6, 6–4, 7–5
1952	(South Africa) Eric Sturgess	(Egypt) Jaroslav Drobný	6–3, 6–2, 6–3
1953	(United States) Budge Patty	(Italy) Fausto Gardini	6–3, 6–2, 6–3
1954	(United States) Budge Patty (2)	(Sweden) Sven Davidson	6–1, 6–1, 7–5
1955	(United States) Arthur Larsen	(Poland) Władysław Skonecki	3–6, 6–3, 7–5, 6–8, 6–3
1956	(Australia) Lew Hoad	(Italy) Orlando Sirola	6–2, 5–7, 6–4, 8–6
1957	(Australia) Mervyn Rose	(France) Pierre Darmon	6–3, 6–0, 6–1
1958	(Sweden) Sven Davidson	(Belgium) Jacques Brichant	5–7, 6–4, 0–6, 9–7, 6–3
1959	(United Kingdom) William Knight	(South Africa) Ian Vermaak	4–6, 6–4, 4–6, 6–3, 8–6
1960	(Italy) Nicola Pietrangeli	(Sweden) Jan-Erik Lundqvist	6–3, 2–6, 6–4, 6–2
1961	(Australia) Rod Laver	(Chile) Luis Ayala	6–2, 6–8, 5–7, 6–1, 6–2
1962	(Australia) Rod Laver (2)	(Spain) Manuel Santana	8–6, 7–5, 6–4
1963	(Australia) Martin Mulligan	(South Africa) Bob Hewitt	6–0, 0–6, 8–6, 6–2
1964	(West Germany) Wilhelm Bungert	(West Germany) Christian Kuhnke	0–6, 6–4, 7–5, 6–2
1965	(South Africa) Cliff Drysdale	(Socialist Federal Republic of Yugoslavia) Boro Jovanović	6–2, 6–4, 3–6, 6–3
1966	(Australia) Fred Stolle	(Hungary) István Gulyás	2–6, 7–5, 6–1, 6–2
1967	(Australia) Roy Emerson	(Spain) Manuel Santana	6–3, 6–3, 6–1
↓ Open Era ↓
1968	(Australia) John Newcombe	(South Africa) Cliff Drysdale	6–3, 6–2, 6–4
1969	(Australia) Tony Roche	(Netherlands) Tom Okker	6–1, 5–7, 7–5, 8–6
1970	(Netherlands) Tom Okker	(Romania) Ilie Năstase	4–6, 6–3, 6–3, 6–4
↓ Grand Prix circuit ↓
1971	(Spain) Andrés Gimeno	(Hungary) Péter Szőke	6–3, 6–2, 6–2
1972	(Spain) Manuel Orantes	(Italy) Adriano Panatta	6–3, 9–8, 6–0
1973	(United States) Eddie Dibbs	(West Germany) Karl Meiler	6–1, 3–6, 7–6, 6–3
1974	(United States) Eddie Dibbs (2)	(West Germany) Hans-Joachim Plötz	6–2, 6–2, 6–3
1975	(Spain) Manuel Orantes (2)	(Czechoslovakia) Jan Kodeš	3–6, 6–2, 6–2, 4–6, 6–1
1976	(United States) Eddie Dibbs (3)	(Spain) Manuel Orantes	6–4, 4–6, 6–1, 2–6, 6–1
1977	(Italy) Paolo Bertolucci	(Spain) Manuel Orantes	6–3, 4–6, 6–2, 6–3
1978	(Argentina) Guillermo Vilas	(Poland) Wojtek Fibak	6–2, 6–4, 6–2
1979	(Spain) José Higueras	(United States) Harold Solomon	3–6, 6–1, 6–4, 6–1
1980	(United States) Harold Solomon	(Argentina) Guillermo Vilas	6–7, 6–2, 6–4, 2–6, 6–3
1981	(Australia) Peter McNamara	(United States) Jimmy Connors	7–6, 6–1, 4–6, 6–4
1982	(Spain) José Higueras (2)	(Australia) Peter McNamara	4–6, 6–7, 7–6, 6–3, 7–6
1983	(France) Yannick Noah	(Spain) José Higueras	3–6, 7–5, 6–2, 6–0
1984	(Spain) Juan Aguilera	(Sweden) Henrik Sundström	6–4, 2–6, 2–6, 6–4, 6–4
1985	(Czechoslovakia) Miloslav Mečíř	(Sweden) Henrik Sundström	6–4, 6–1, 6–4
1986	(France) Henri Leconte	(Czechoslovakia) Miloslav Mečíř	6–2, 5–7, 6–4, 6–2
1987	(Czechoslovakia) Ivan Lendl	(Czechoslovakia) Miloslav Mečíř	6–1, 6–3, 6–3
1988	(Sweden) Kent Carlsson	(France) Henri Leconte	6–2, 6–1, 6–4
1989	(Czechoslovakia) Ivan Lendl (2)	(Austria) Horst Skoff	6–4, 6–1, 6–3
↓ ATP 1000 (Note: Known as Championship Series, Single Week from 1990 till 1995, Super 9 from 1996 till 1999 and Masters Series from 2000 till 2008.) ↓
1990	(Spain) Juan Aguilera (2)	(Germany) Boris Becker	6–1, 6–0, 7–6
1991	(Czechoslovakia) Karel Nováček	(Sweden) Magnus Gustafsson	6–3, 6–3, 5–7, 0–6, 6–1
1992	(Sweden) Stefan Edberg	(Germany) Michael Stich	5–7, 6–4, 6–1
1993	(Germany) Michael Stich	(Russia) Andrei Chesnokov	6–3, 6–7^{(1–7)}, 7–6^{(9–7)}, 6–4
1994	(Ukraine) Andrei Medvedev	(Russia) Yevgeny Kafelnikov	6–4, 6–4, 3–6, 6–3
1995	(Ukraine) Andrei Medvedev (2)	(Croatia) Goran Ivanišević	6–3, 6–2, 6–1
1996	(Spain) Roberto Carretero	(Spain) Àlex Corretja	2–6, 6–4, 6–4, 6–4
1997	(Ukraine) Andrei Medvedev (3)	(Spain) Félix Mantilla	6–0, 6–4, 6–2
1998	(Spain) Albert Costa	(Spain) Àlex Corretja	6–2, 6–0, 1–0 retired
1999	(Chile) Marcelo Ríos	(Argentina) Mariano Zabaleta	6–7^{(5–7)}, 7–5, 5–7, 7–6^{(7–5)}, 6–2
2000	(Brazil) Gustavo Kuerten	(Russia) Marat Safin	6–4, 5–7, 6–4, 5–7, 7–6^{(7–3)}
2001	(Spain) Albert Portas	(Spain) Juan Carlos Ferrero	4–6, 6–2, 0–6, 7–6^{(7–5)}, 7–5
2002	(Switzerland) Roger Federer	(Russia) Marat Safin	6–1, 6–3, 6–4
2003	(Argentina) Guillermo Coria	(Argentina) Agustín Calleri	6–3, 6–4, 6–4
2004	(Switzerland) Roger Federer (2)	(Argentina) Guillermo Coria	4–6, 6–4, 6–2, 6–3
2005	(Switzerland) Roger Federer (3)	(France) Richard Gasquet	6–3, 7–5, 7–6^{(7–4)}
2006	(Spain) Tommy Robredo	(Czech Republic) Radek Štěpánek	6–1, 6–3, 6–3
2007	(Switzerland) Roger Federer (4)	(Spain) Rafael Nadal	2–6, 6–2, 6–0
2008	(Spain) Rafael Nadal	(Switzerland) Roger Federer	7–5, 6–7^{(3–7)}, 6–3
↓ ATP 500 ↓
2009	(Russia) Nikolay Davydenko	(France) Paul-Henri Mathieu	6–4, 6–2
2010	(Kazakhstan) Andrey Golubev	(Austria) Jürgen Melzer	6–3, 7–5
2011	(France) Gilles Simon	(Spain) Nicolás Almagro	6–4, 4–6, 6–4
2012	(Argentina) Juan Mónaco	(Germany) Tommy Haas	7–5, 6–4
2013	(Italy) Fabio Fognini	(Argentina) Federico Delbonis	4–6, 7–6^{(10–8)}, 6–2
2014	(Argentina) Leonardo Mayer	(Spain) David Ferrer	6–7^{(3–7)}, 6–1, 7–6^{(7–4)}
2015	(Spain) Rafael Nadal (2)	(Italy) Fabio Fognini	7–5, 7–5
2016	(Slovakia) Martin Kližan	(Uruguay) Pablo Cuevas	6–1, 6–4
2017	(Argentina) Leonardo Mayer (2)	(Germany) Florian Mayer	6–4, 4–6, 6–3
2018	(Georgia (country)) Nikoloz Basilashvili	(Argentina) Leonardo Mayer	6–4, 0–6, 7–5
2019	(Georgia (country)) Nikoloz Basilashvili (2)	(Russia) Andrey Rublev	7–5, 4–6, 6–3
2020	(Russia) Andrey Rublev	(Greece) Stefanos Tsitsipas	6–4, 3–6, 7–5
2021	(Spain) Pablo Carreño Busta	(Serbia) Filip Krajinović	6–2, 6–4
2022	(Italy) Lorenzo Musetti	(Spain) Carlos Alcaraz	6–4, 6–7^{(6–8)}, 6–4
2023	(Germany) Alexander Zverev	(Serbia) Laslo Djere	7–5, 6–3
2024	(France) Arthur Fils	(Germany) Alexander Zverev	6–3, 3–6, 7–6^{(7–1)}
2025	(Italy) Flavio Cobolli	Andrey Rublev	6–2, 6–4
2026	(Peru) Ignacio Buse	(United States) Tommy Paul	7–6^{(8–6)}, 4–6, 6–3

=== Women's singles ===
This section contains information of finals for WTA Hamburg (1982–2002) and Hamburg European Open (from 2021) only, except 2024 which was held as WTA 125 tournament.
For information regarding finals of the German Open that was held concurrently with the men's event up to and including 1978, please see German Open (WTA) Past finals.

Year	Champion	Runners-up	Score
1982	(United States) Lisa Bonder-Kreiss	(Czechoslovakia) Renáta Tomanová	6–3, 6–2
1983	(Hungary) Andrea Temesvári	(West Germany) Eva Pfaff	6–4, 6–2
1984– 1986	Not held		
1987	(West Germany) Steffi Graf	(West Germany) Isabel Cueto	6–2, 6–2
1988	(West Germany) Steffi Graf (2)	(Bulgaria) Katerina Maleeva	6–4, 6–2
1989	(West Germany) Steffi Graf (3)	(Czechoslovakia) Jana Novotná	Walkover
1990	(West Germany) Steffi Graf (4)	(Spain) Arantxa Sánchez Vicario	5–7, 6–0, 6–1
1991	(Germany) Steffi Graf (5)	(Socialist Federal Republic of Yugoslavia) Monica Seles	7–5, 6–7^{(4–7)}, 6–3
1992	(Germany) Steffi Graf (6)	(Spain) Arantxa Sánchez Vicario	7–6^{(7–5)}, 6–2
1993	(Spain) Arantxa Sánchez Vicario	(Germany) Steffi Graf	6–3, 6–3
1994	(Spain) Arantxa Sánchez Vicario (2)	(Germany) Steffi Graf	4–6, 7–6, 7–6
1995	(Spain) Conchita Martínez	(Switzerland) Martina Hingis	6–1, 6–0
1996	(Spain) Arantxa Sánchez Vicario (3)	(Spain) Conchita Martínez	4–6, 7–6, 6–0
1997	(Croatia) Iva Majoli	(Romania) Ruxandra Dragomir	6–3, 6–2
1998	(Switzerland) Martina Hingis	(Czech Republic) Jana Novotná	6–3, 7–5
1999	(United States) Venus Williams	(France) Mary Pierce	6–0, 6–3
2000	(Switzerland) Martina Hingis (2)	(Spain) Arantxa Sánchez Vicario	6–3, 6–3
2001	(United States) Venus Williams (2)	(United States) Meghann Shaughnessy	6–3, 6–0
2002	(Belgium) Kim Clijsters	(United States) Venus Williams	1–6, 6–3, 6–4
2003– 2020	Not held		
2021	(Romania) Elena-Gabriela Ruse	(Germany) Andrea Petkovic	7–6^{(8–6)}, 6–4
2022	(United States) Bernarda Pera	(Estonia) Anett Kontaveit	6–2, 6–4
2023	(Netherlands) Arantxa Rus	(Germany) Noma Noha Akugue	6–0, 7–6^{(7–3)}
↓ WTA 125 ↓
2024	(Hungary) Anna Bondár	(Netherlands) Arantxa Rus	6–4, 6–2
↓ WTA 250 ↓
2025	(France) Loïs Boisson	(Hungary) Anna Bondár	7–5, 6–3
2026	(Germany) Tamara Korpatsch	(Hungary) Anna Bondár	6–3, 6–3

=== Men's doubles ===
Year	Champions	Runners-ups	Score
1902	(France) Max Decugis (France) Maurice Germot	(German Empire) Bornemann (German Empire) Thomsen	7–9, 6–2, 3–6, 6–1, 6–2
1903	(Austria-Hungary) Rolf Kinzl (Austria-Hungary) Kurt von Wessely		
1904	(United Kingdom) Major Ritchie (United Kingdom) Wilmot Ernest Lane		
1905	(New Zealand) Anthony Wilding (German Empire) E. Spitz		
1906	(United Kingdom) Major Ritchie (2) (German Empire) Gerhard F. Adler	V. v. Müller (German Empire) Oscar Kreuzer	7–5, 2–6, 4–6, 6–3, 6–3
1907	(German Empire) Otto Froitzheim (Belgium) Louis Trasenster	(United Kingdom) Major Ritchie (German Empire) Gerhard F. Adler	6–3, 6–4, 6–3
1908	(German Empire) Otto von Müller (German Empire) Heinrich Schomburgk	(United Kingdom) Major Ritchie (German Empire) Gerhard F. Adler	2–6, 6–1, 6–0
1909	(German Empire) Friedrich Rahe (German Empire) Curt Bergmann		
1910	(German Empire) Otto von Müller (2) (German Empire) Heinrich Schomburgk (2)	(German Empire) Otto Froitzheim (German Empire) Otto Lindpaintner	5–7, 5–7, 6–3, 6–0, 6–1
1911	(German Empire) Otto Froitzheim (2) (Austria-Hungary) Felix Pipes		
1912	(German Empire) Luis Maria Heyden (Belgium) Louis Trasenster	(German Empire) Heinrich Schomburgk (German Empire) Otto von Müller	6–1, 6–3, 6–4
1913	(Austria-Hungary) Rolf Kinzl (2) (Austria-Hungary) Kurt von Wessely (2)		
1914– 1919	Not held		
1920	(Austria) Ludwig von Salm (Weimar Republic) Oscar Kreuzer		
1921	(Weimar Republic) Luis Maria Heyden (2) (Weimar Republic) Heinrich Schomburgk (3)		
1922	(Weimar Republic) Otto Froitzheim (3) (Weimar Republic) Oscar Kreuzer (2)		
1923	(Weimar Republic) Friedrich Rahe (2) (Hungary) Béla von Kehrling		
1924	(Weimar Republic) Friedrich Rahe (3) (Hungary) Béla von Kehrling (2)		
1925	(Weimar Republic) Otto Froitzheim (4) (Weimar Republic) Oscar Kreuzer (3)		
1926	(Weimar Republic) Friedrich Rahe (4) (Hungary) Béla von Kehrling (3)		
1927	(United Kingdom) Donald Greig (United Kingdom) Maurice Summerson		
1928	(Australia) Jack Cummings (Australia) Edgar Moon		
1929	(France) Jacques Brugnon (France) Christian Boussus	(France) Pierre Henri Landry (South Africa) Pat Spence	8–6, 6–2, 6–4
1930	(Australia) Jack Crawford (Australia) Edgar Moon (2)	(Japan) Tamio Abe (Japan) Takeichi Harada	6–3, 2–6, 6–4, 6–3
1931	(Weimar Republic) Walter Dessart (Weimar Republic) Eberhard Nourney	(France) René de Buzelet (France) Christian Boussus	6–3, 6–3, 5–7, 4–6, 6–0
1932	(Australia) Jack Crawford (2) (Australia) Harry Hopman	(United Kingdom) Pat Hughes (United Kingdom) Harry Lee	7–5, 6–3, 3–6, 6–3
1933	(Japan) Ryosuki Nunoi (Japan) Jiro Sato		
1934	(Spain) Enrique Maier (Australia) Adrian Quist	(Czechoslovakia) Vojtěch Vodička (Czechoslovakia) Josef Caska	6–2, 6–4, 6–3
1935	(Germany) Henner Henkel (Germany) Helmut Denker		
1936	Not held		
1937	(Australia) Jack Crawford (3) (Australia) Vivian McGrath	(United Kingdom) Don Butler (United Kingdom) Frank Wilde	5–7, 6–4, 2–6, 6–4, 6–3
1938	(France) Yvon Petra (France) Jean Lesueur		
1939	(Nazi Germany) Henner Henkel (2) (Nazi Germany) Roderich Menzel	Owen Anderson; E. Smith	6–1, 7–5, 6–4
1940– 1947	Not held		
1948	(West Germany) Gottfried von Cramm (Australia) Jack Harper		6–3, 6–3, 6–1
1949	(West Germany) Gottfried von Cramm (2) (Australia) Jack Harper (2)	(West Germany) Ernst Buchholz (West Germany) Engelbert Koch	6–3, 7–5, 5–7, 6–4
1950	(Australia) Adrian Quist (Australia) Bill Sidwell	(West Germany) Gottfried von Cramm (Australia) Jack Harper	6–4, 8–6, 6–2
1951	(Denmark) Kurt Nielsen (Denmark) Torben Ulrich	(West Germany) Gottfried von Cramm (Germany) Rolf Göpfert	4–6, 6–3, 4–6, 6–4, 7–5
1952	(Egypt) Jaroslav Drobný (Australia) Ian Ayre	(United Kingdom) Tony Mottram (South Africa) Eric Sturgess	3–6, 8–6, 6–3
1953	(West Germany) Gottfried von Cramm (3) (United States) Budge Patty	(Austria) Freddie Huber (Austria) Hans Redl	8–6, 4–6, 3–6, 6–2, 6–2
1954	(West Germany) Gottfried von Cramm (4) (United States) Budge Patty (2)	(Sweden) Lennart Bergelin (Sweden) Sven Davidson	9–7, 6–4, 6–2
1955	(West Germany) Gottfried von Cramm (5) (United States) Budge Patty (3)	(Australia) Adrian Quist (South Africa) W.R. Seymour	6–1, 7–9, 6–4, 9–7
1956	(Australia) Don Candy (Australia) Lew Hoad	(Chile) Luis Ayala (Sweden) Sven Davidson	6–4, 7–5, 6–2
1957	(Australia) Don Candy (2) (Australia) Mervyn Rose	(Italy) Nicola Pietrangeli (Italy) Orlando Sirola	10–8, 6–3, 6–3
1958	(Mexico) Francisco Contreras (Mexico) Mario Llamas	(Austria) Ladislav Legenstein (Socialist Federal Republic of Yugoslavia) Vladimir Petrović	6–3, 6–4, 6–3
1959	(Australia) Don Candy (3) (Chile) Luis Ayala	(United Kingdom) Billy Knight (Brazil) Carlos Fernandes	6–8, 6–3, 7–5, 6–2
1960	(Australia) Roy Emerson (Australia) Neale Fraser	(West Germany) Peter Schell (Austria) Ladislav Legenstein	7–5, 3–6, 6–3, 9–7
1961	(South Africa) Bob Hewitt (Australia) Fred Stolle		
1962	(South Africa) Bob Hewitt (2) (Australia) Martin Mulligan		
1963	(South Africa) Bob Hewitt (3) (Australia) Fred Stolle (2)		
1964	(Spain) José Luis Arilla (Spain) Manuel Santana		
1965	(West Germany) Ingo Buding (West Germany) Christian Kuhnke		
1966	(Australia) Fred Stolle (3) (Denmark) Torben Ulrich (2)		
1967	(South Africa) Bob Hewitt (4) (South Africa) Frew McMillan		
↓ Open Era ↓
1968	(Netherlands) Tom Okker (United States) Marty Riessen	(Australia) John Newcombe (Australia) Tony Roche	6–4, 6–4, 7–5
1969	(Netherlands) Tom Okker (2) (United States) Marty Riessen (2)	(France) Jean-Claude Barclay (Germany) Jürgen Fassbender	6–1, 6–2, 6–4
1970	(South Africa) Bob Hewitt (5) (South Africa) Frew McMillan (2)	(Netherlands) Tom Okker (Socialist Federal Republic of Yugoslavia) Nikola Pilić	6–3, 7–5, 6–2
↓ Grand Prix circuit ↓
1971	(Australia) John Alexander (Spain) Andrés Gimeno	(Australia) Dick Crealy (Australia) Allan Stone	6–4, 7–5, 7–9, 6–4
1972	(Czechoslovakia) Jan Kodeš (Romania) Ilie Năstase	(South Africa) Bob Hewitt (Romania) Ion Țiriac	4–6, 6–0, 3–6, 6–2, 6–2
1973	(West Germany) Jürgen Fassbender (West Germany) Hans-Jürgen Pohmann	(Spain) Manuel Orantes (Romania) Ion Țiriac	7–6, 7–6, 7–6
1974	(West Germany) Jürgen Fassbender (2) (West Germany) Hans-Jürgen Pohmann (2)	(United States) Brian Gottfried (Mexico) Raúl Ramírez	6–3, 6–4, 6–4
1975	(Spain) Juan Gisbert (Spain) Manuel Orantes	(Poland) Wojtek Fibak (Czechoslovakia) Jan Kodeš	6–3, 7–6
1976	(United States) Fred McNair (United States) Sherwood Stewart	(Australia) Dick Crealy (Australia) Kim Warwick	7–6, 7–6, 7–6
1977	(South Africa) Bob Hewitt (6) (West Germany) Karl Meiler	(Australia) Phil Dent (Australia) Kim Warwick	3–6, 6–3, 6–4, 6–4
1978	(Poland) Wojtek Fibak (Netherlands) Tom Okker (3)	(Spain) Antonio Muñoz (Paraguay) Víctor Pecci	6–2, 6–4
1979	(Czechoslovakia) Jan Kodeš (2) (Czechoslovakia) Tomáš Šmíd	(Australia) Mark Edmondson (Australia) John Marks	6–3, 6–1, 7–6
1980	(Ecuador) Andrés Gómez (Chile) Heinz Gildemeister	(West Germany) Reinhart Probst (West Germany) Max Wünschig	6–3, 6–4
1981	(Chile) Hans Gildemeister (Ecuador) Andrés Gómez (2)	(Australia) Paul McNamee (Australia) Peter McNamara	6–4, 3–6, 6–4
1982	(Czechoslovakia) Pavel Složil (Czechoslovakia) Tomáš Šmíd (2)	(Sweden) Anders Järryd (Sweden) Hans Simonsson	6–4, 6–3
1983	(Switzerland) Heinz Günthardt (Hungary) Balázs Taróczy	(Australia) Mark Edmondson (United States) Brian Gottfried	7–6, 4–6, 6–4
1984	(Sweden) Stefan Edberg (Sweden) Anders Järryd	(Switzerland) Heinz Günthardt (Hungary) Balázs Taróczy	6–3, 6–1
1985	(Chile) Hans Gildemeister (2) (Ecuador) Andrés Gómez (4)	(Switzerland) Heinz Günthardt (Hungary) Balázs Taróczy	1–6, 7–6, 6–4
1986	(Spain) Sergio Casal (Spain) Emilio Sánchez	(West Germany) Boris Becker (West Germany) Eric Jelen	6–4, 6–1
1987	(Czechoslovakia) Miloslav Mečíř (Czechoslovakia) Tomáš Šmíd (3)	(Switzerland) Claudio Mezzadri (United States) Jim Pugh	4–6, 7–6, 6–2
1988	(Australia) Darren Cahill (Australia) Laurie Warder	(United States) Rick Leach (United States) Jim Pugh	6–4, 6–4
1989	(Spain) Emilio Sánchez (2) (Spain) Javier Sánchez	(West Germany) Boris Becker (West Germany) Eric Jelen	6–4, 6–1
↓ ATP Tour Masters 1000 ↓
1990	(Spain) Sergi Bruguera (United States) Jim Courier	(Germany) Udo Riglewski (Germany) Michael Stich	4-6, 6-1, 7-6
1991	(Spain) Sergio Casal (2) (Spain) Emilio Sánchez (3)	(Brazil) Cássio Motta (South Africa) Danie Visser	4–6, 6–3, 6–2
1992	(Spain) Sergio Casal (3) (Spain) Emilio Sánchez (4)	(Germany) Carl-Uwe Steeb (Germany) Michael Stich	5–7, 6–4, 6–3
1993	(Netherlands) Paul Haarhuis (Netherlands) Mark Koevermans	(Canada) Grant Connell (United States) Patrick Galbraith	6–4, 6–7, 7–6
1994	(United States) Scott Melville (South Africa) Piet Norval	(Sweden) Henrik Holm (Sweden) Anders Järryd	6–3, 6–4
1995	(South Africa) Wayne Ferreira (Russia) Yevgeny Kafelnikov	(Zimbabwe) Byron Black (Russia) Andrei Olhovskiy	6–1, 7–6
1996	(The Bahamas) Mark Knowles (Canada) Daniel Nestor	(France) Guy Forget (Switzerland) Jakob Hlasek	6–2, 6–4
1997	(Argentina) Luis Lobo (Spain) Javier Sánchez (2)	(United Kingdom) Neil Broad (South Africa) Piet Norval	6–3, 7–6
1998	(United States) Donald Johnson (United States) Francisco Montana	(South Africa) David Adams (New Zealand) Brett Steven	6–2, 7–5
1999	(Australia) Wayne Arthurs (Australia) Andrew Kratzmann	(Netherlands) Paul Haarhuis (United States) Jared Palmer	2–6, 7–6^{(7–5)}, 6–2
2000	(Australia) Todd Woodbridge (Australia) Mark Woodforde	(Australia) Wayne Arthurs (Australia) Sandon Stolle	6–7^{(4–7)}, 6–4, 6–3
2001	(Sweden) Jonas Björkman (Australia) Todd Woodbridge (2)	(Canada) Daniel Nestor (Australia) Sandon Stolle	7–6^{(7–2)}, 3–6, 6–3
2002	(India) Mahesh Bhupathi (United States) Jan-Michael Gambill	(Sweden) Jonas Björkman (Australia) Todd Woodbridge	6–2, 6–4
2003	(The Bahamas) Mark Knowles (2) (Canada) Daniel Nestor (2)	(India) Mahesh Bhupathi (Belarus) Max Mirnyi	6–4, 7–6^{(12–10)}
2004	(Zimbabwe) Wayne Black (Zimbabwe) Kevin Ullyett	(United States) Bob Bryan (United States) Mike Bryan	6–4, 6–2
2005	(Sweden) Jonas Björkman (2) (Belarus) Max Mirnyi	(France) Michaël Llodra (France) Fabrice Santoro	4–6, 7–6^{(7–2)}, 7–6^{(7–3)}
2006	(Australia) Paul Hanley (Zimbabwe) Kevin Ullyett (2)	(The Bahamas) Mark Knowles (Canada) Daniel Nestor	6–2, 7–6^{(10–8)}
2007	(United States) Bob Bryan (United States) Mike Bryan	(Australia) Paul Hanley (Zimbabwe) Kevin Ullyett	6–3, 6–4
2008	(Canada) Daniel Nestor (3) (Serbia) Nenad Zimonjić	(United States) Bob Bryan (United States) Mike Bryan	6–4, 5–7, [10–8]
↓ ATP Tour 500 ↓
2009	(Sweden) Simon Aspelin (Australia) Paul Hanley (2)	(Brazil) Marcelo Melo (Slovakia) Filip Polášek	6–3, 6–3
2010	(Spain) Marc López (Spain) David Marrero	(France) Jérémy Chardy (France) Paul-Henri Mathieu	6–3, 2–6, [10–8]
2011	(Austria) Oliver Marach (Austria) Alexander Peya	(Czech Republic) František Čermák (Slovakia) Filip Polášek	6–4, 6–1
2012	(Spain) David Marrero (2) (Spain) Fernando Verdasco	(Brazil) Rogério Dutra da Silva (Spain) Daniel Muñoz de la Nava	6–4, 6–3
2013	(Poland) Mariusz Fyrstenberg (Poland) Marcin Matkowski	(Austria) Alexander Peya (Brazil) Bruno Soares	3–6, 6–1, [10–8]
2014	(Croatia) Marin Draganja (Romania) Florin Mergea	(Austria) Alexander Peya (Brazil) Bruno Soares	6–4, 7–5
2015	(United Kingdom) Jamie Murray (Australia) John Peers	(Colombia) Juan Sebastián Cabal (Colombia) Robert Farah	2–6, 6–3, [10–8]
2016	(Finland) Henri Kontinen (Australia) John Peers (2)	(Canada) Daniel Nestor (Pakistan) Aisam-ul-Haq Qureshi	7–5, 6–3
2017	(Croatia) Ivan Dodig (Croatia) Mate Pavić	(Uruguay) Pablo Cuevas (Spain) Marc López	6–3, 6–4
2018	(Chile) Julio Peralta (Argentina) Horacio Zeballos	(Austria) Oliver Marach (Croatia) Mate Pavić	6–1, 4–6, [10–6]
2019	(Austria) Oliver Marach (2) (Austria) Jürgen Melzer	(Netherlands) Robin Haase (Netherlands) Wesley Koolhof	6–2, 7–6^{(7–3)}
2020	(Australia) John Peers (3) (New Zealand) Michael Venus	(Croatia) Ivan Dodig (Croatia) Mate Pavić	6–3, 6–4
2021	(Germany) Tim Pütz (New Zealand) Michael Venus (2)	(Germany) Kevin Krawietz (Romania) Horia Tecău	6–3, 6–7^{(3–7)}, [10–8]
2022	(United Kingdom) Lloyd Glasspool (Finland) Harri Heliövaara	(India) Rohan Bopanna (Netherlands) Matwé Middelkoop	6–2, 6–4
2023	(Germany) Kevin Krawietz (Germany) Tim Pütz (2)	(Belgium) Sander Gillé (Belgium) Joran Vliegen	7–6^{(7–4)}, 6–3
2024	(Germany) Kevin Krawietz (2) (Germany) Tim Pütz (3)	(France) Fabien Reboul (France) Édouard Roger-Vasselin	7–6^{(10–8)}, 6–2
2025	(Italy) Simone Bolelli (Italy) Andrea Vavassori	(Argentina) Andrés Molteni (Brazil) Fernando Romboli	6–4, 6–0
2026	(Germany) Kevin Krawietz (3) (Germany) Tim Pütz (4)	(France) Sadio Doumbia (France) Fabien Reboul	6–3, 4–6, [10–8]

=== Women's doubles ===
This section contains information of finals for WTA Hamburg (1982–2002) and Hamburg European Open (from 2021) only.
For information regarding finals of the German Open that was held concurrently with the men's event up to and including 1978, see German Open (WTA) Past finals.

Year	Champions	Runners-ups	Score
1982	(Sweden) Elisabeth Ekblom (Sweden) Lena Sandin	(Brazil) Pat Medrado (Brazil) Cláudia Monteiro	7–6, 6–3
1983	(West Germany) Bettina Bunge (West Germany) Claudia Kohde-Kilsch	(Argentina) Ivanna Madruga (France) Catherine Tanvier	7–5, 6–4
1987	(West Germany) Claudia Kohde-Kilsch (2) (Czechoslovakia) Jana Novotná	(Soviet Union) Natalia Egorova (Soviet Union) Leila Meskhi	7–6, 7–6
1988	(Czechoslovakia) Jana Novotná (2) (Denmark) Tine Scheuer-Larsen	(West Germany) Andrea Betzner (Austria) Judith Wiesner	6–4, 6–2
1989	(France) Isabelle Demongeot (France) Nathalie Tauziat	(Czechoslovakia) Jana Novotná (Czechoslovakia) Helena Suková	walkover
1990	(United States) Gigi Fernández (United States) Martina Navratilova	(Soviet Union) Larisa Neiland (Czechoslovakia) Helena Suková	6–2, 6–3
1991	(Czechoslovakia) Jana Novotná (3) (Soviet Union) Larisa Neiland	(Spain) Arantxa Sánchez Vicario (Czechoslovakia) Helena Suková	7–5, 6–1
1992	(Germany) Steffi Graf (Australia) Rennae Stubbs	(Netherlands) Manon Bollegraf (Spain) Arantxa Sánchez Vicario	4–6, 6–3, 6–4
1993	(Germany) Steffi Graf (2) (Australia) Rennae Stubbs (2)	(Latvia) Larisa Neiland (Czech Republic) Jana Novotná	6–4, 7–6
1994	(Czech Republic) Jana Novotná (4) (Spain) Arantxa Sánchez Vicario	(Russia) Eugenia Maniokova (Georgia (country)) Leila Meskhi	6–3, 6–2
1995	(United States) Gigi Fernández (2) (Switzerland) Martina Hingis	(Spain) Conchita Martínez (Argentina) Patricia Tarabini	6–2, 6–3
1996	(Spain) Arantxa Sánchez Vicario (2) (Netherlands) Brenda Schultz	(United States) Gigi Fernández (Switzerland) Martina Hingis	4–6, 7–6, 6–4
1997	(Germany) Anke Huber (France) Mary Pierce	(Romania) Ruxandra Dragomir (Croatia) Iva Majoli	2–6, 7–6, 6–2
1998	(Austria) Barbara Schett (Switzerland) Patty Schnyder	(Switzerland) Martina Hingis (Czech Republic) Jana Novotná	7–6, 3–6, 6–3
1999	(Latvia) Larisa Neiland (2) (Spain) Arantxa Sánchez Vicario (3)	(South Africa) Amanda Coetzer (Czech Republic) Jana Novotná	6–2, 6–1
2000	(Russia) Anna Kournikova (Belarus) Natasha Zvereva	(United States) Nicole Arendt (Netherlands) Manon Bollegraf	6–7, 6–2, 6–4
2001	(Zimbabwe) Cara Black (Russia) Elena Likhovtseva	(Czech Republic) Květa Peschke (Germany) Barbara Rittner	6–2, 4–6, 6–2
2002	(Switzerland) Martina Hingis (2) (Austria) Barbara Schett (2)	(Slovakia) Daniela Hantuchová (Spain) Arantxa Sánchez Vicario	6–1, 6–1
2003– 2020	Not held		
2021	(Italy) Jasmine Paolini (Switzerland) Jil Teichmann	(Australia) Astra Sharma (Netherlands) Rosalie van der Hoek	6–0, 6–4
2022	(United States) Sophie Chang (United States) Angela Kulikov	(Japan) Miyu Kato (Indonesia) Aldila Sutjiadi	6–3, 4–6, [10–6]
2023	(Kazakhstan) Anna Danilina (Note: Competed under no nationality due to the Russian invasion of Ukraine.) Alexandra Panova	(Czech Republic) Miriam Kolodziejová (United States) Angela Kulikov	6–4, 6–2
↓ WTA 125 ↓
2024	(Hungary) Anna Bondár (Belgium) Kimberley Zimmermann	(Netherlands) Arantxa Rus (Serbia) Nina Stojanović	5–7, 6–3, [11–9]
↓ WTA 250 ↓
2025	(Ukraine) Nadiia Kichenok (Japan) Makoto Ninomiya	(Hungary) Anna Bondár (Netherlands) Arantxa Rus	6–4, 3–6, [11–9]
2026	(Slovenia) Dalila Jakupović (Slovenia) Nika Radišić	(Belgium) Magali Kempen; Alexandra Panova	5–7, 6–3, [10–5]

== Records ==
Record	Era	Player(s)	Count	Years
Men since 1892
Most singles titles	Pre-Open Era	(Germany) Otto Froitzheim	7	1907, 1909, 1910, 1911, 1921, 1922, 1925
Most singles titles	Open Era	(Switzerland) Roger Federer	4	2002, 2004, 2005, 2007
Most consecutive singles titles	Pre-Open Era	(United Kingdom of Great Britain and Ireland) Josiah Ritchie	4	1903–1906
Most consecutive singles titles	Pre-Open Era	(Germany) Gottfried von Cramm	4	1932–1935
Most consecutive singles titles	Open Era	(United States) Eddie Dibbs	2	1973–1974
Most consecutive singles titles	Open Era	(Ukraine) Andrei Medvedev	2	1994–1995
Most consecutive singles titles	Open Era	(Switzerland) Roger Federer	2	2004–2005
Most consecutive singles titles	Open Era	(Georgia (country)) Nikoloz Basilashvili	2	2018–2019
Most doubles titles	Open Era (Note: Pre-Open and Open Era combined)	(South Africa) Bob Hewitt	6	1961, 1962, 1963, 1967, 1970, 1977
Most consecutive doubles titles	Pre-Open Era	(West Germany) Gottfried von Cramm	3	1933–1935
Most consecutive doubles titles	Pre-Open Era	(South Africa) Bob Hewitt	3	1961–1963
Most consecutive doubles titles	Open Era	(West Germany) Jürgen Fassbender/Hans-Jürgen Pohmann	2	1973–1974
Most consecutive doubles titles	Open Era	(Australia) Todd Woodbridge	2	2000–2001
Most consecutive doubles titles	Open Era	(Spain) Sergio Casal/Emilio Sánchez	2	1991–1992
Most consecutive doubles titles	Open Era	(Ecuador) Andrés Gómez	2	1980–1981
Most singles finals	Pre-Open Era	(Germany) Otto Froitzheim	8	1907, 1909, 1910, 1911, 1921, 1922, 1925, 1929
Most singles finals	Open Era	(Switzerland) Roger Federer	5	2002, 2004, 2005, 2007, 2008
Miscellaneous
Most appearances	Open Era	(Germany) Philipp Kohlschreiber	17	2002, 2005–2012, 2014–2021
Most singles matches played	Open Era	(Argentina) Guillermo Vilas	46	1973–1975, 1977–1978, 1980, 1983–1988
Most singles matches won	Open Era	(Argentina) Guillermo Vilas	35	1973–1975, 1977–1978, 1980, 1983–1988
Youngest Champion	Open Era	(Ukraine) Andrei Medvedev	19 year	1994
Oldest Champion	Open Era	(Spain) Andrés Gimeno	33 year	1971
WTA Hamburg (1982–2002)
Most singles titles	Open Era	(Germany) Steffi Graf	6	1987–1992
Most consecutive singles titles	Open Era	(Germany) Steffi Graf	6	1987–1992
Most doubles titles	Open Era	(Czech Republic) Jana Novotná	3	1987, 1988, 1991
Most doubles titles	Open Era	(Spain) Arantxa Sánchez Vicario	3	1994, 1996, 1999
Most consecutive double titles	Open Era	(Germany) Claudia Kohde-Kilsch	2	1983–1984
Most consecutive double titles	Open Era	(Czech Republic) Jana Novotná	2	1987–1988
Most consecutive double titles	Open Era	(Germany) Steffi Graf	2	1992–1993
Most consecutive double titles	Open Era	(Australia) Rennae Stubbs	2	1992–1993
Most singles finals	Open Era	(Germany) Steffi Graf	8	1987–1994

== See also ==
- WTA German Open
- Bavarian International Tennis Championships
- Stuttgart Open
- Women's Stuttgart Open
- Bad Homburg Open
- List of tennis tournaments
