= Northern India Championships =

Defunct tennis tournament
- Event name: Northern India Lawn Tennis Championships
- Founded: 1899; 126 years ago
- Abolished: 1975; 50 years ago
- Location: Various
- Venue: Various
- Surface: Grass

The Northern India Championships or formally the Northern India Lawn Tennis Championship and, also known as the Northern India Tennis Championships, was a combined men's and women's tennis tournament founded as the North India Championship c. 1899. The first tournament was played at Delhi, India. The championships ran until 1970 before it was discontinued.

== History ==
Tennis was introduced to India in the 1880s by British Army and Civilian Officers. In 1899 the North India Championship was established and played at Delhi, India. The championships were not staged during World War II and a few years after Indian Independence in 1947.

The tournament was hosted at different cities in India and was also played on different surfaces, such as grass courts and clay courts. This tournament was also held in conjunction with the National Lawn Tennis Championships of India for the years 1962-67. In 1969 and 1970 the event was also held in conjunction with the Punjab State Championships.

== Locations and venues ==
The Northern India Championships were predominantly staged in New Delhi, over a number of years it was also held in other cities such as Amritsar and Lahore at the Cosmopolitan Club, Lahore and Lahore Gymkhana Club.

== Finals ==
=== Men's singles ===
Incomplete roll included.

Year	Location	Winner	Runner-up	Score
North India Championship
1899	Delhi	(British Raj) Abdul Majid	(British Raj) ?	?
Northern India Championships
1919	Delhi	(British Raj) Hassan Ali Fyzee	(British Raj) Bhagwan Dass	6–2, 6–2, 6–3
1933	Lahore	(Italy) Giorgio de Stefani	(Italy) Emanuele Sertorio	6–0, 6–3
1936	Lahore	(British Raj) Ghaus Mohammed Khan	(British Raj) Subba L.R. Sawhney	2–6, 6–3, 5–5, ret.
1937	Lahore	(British Raj) Subba L.R. Sawhney	(British Raj) Hira-Lal Soni	6–4, 6–1, 6–3
1938	Lahore	(British Raj) Subba L.R. Sawhney	(British Raj) Hira-Lal Soni	6–4, 6–1, 6–3
1939	Lahore	(British Raj) Khan-Iftikhar Ahmed	(British Raj) Sohan Lal	6–3, 2–6, 7–5, 8–6
1940	Lahore	(British Raj) Ghaus Mohammed Khan	(Socialist Federal Republic of Yugoslavia) Franjo Kukuljević	7–9, 6–3, 6–3, 6–3
1941/1944	Not held (due to World War II)			
1950	New Delhi	(Philippines) Felicisimo Hermoso Ampon	(United Kingdom) Geoff Paish	9–7, 9–7, 5–7, 6–0
1952	New Delhi	(United Kingdom) Tony Mottram	(India) Naresh Kumar	7–5, 2–6, 6–4, 6–2
1954	New Delhi	(Australia) Jack Arkinstall	(Sweden) Staffan Stockenberg	6–2, 7–5, 6–3.
1955	New Delhi	(India) Ramanathan Krishnan	(Poland) Władysław Skonecki	6–3, 6–1, 6–2
1957	Delhi	(India) Ramanathan Krishnan	(Australia) Jack Arkinstall	6–3, 6–4, 6–3
1958	New Delhi	(Sweden) Ulf Schmidt	(United Kingdom) Billy Knight	6–2, 4–6, 6–3, 6–4
1959	New Delhi	(India) Ramanathan Krishnan	(Sweden) Ulf Schmidt	6–3, 6–3, 6–1
1961	New Delhi	(India) Ramanathan Krishnan	(India) Premjit Lall	6–4, 6–4, 6–2
Northern India and India National Championships
1962	New Delhi	(Australia) Roy Emerson	(India) Ramanathan Krishnan	6–4, 6–4, 6–3
1963	New Delhi	(India) Ramanathan Krishnan (7)	(India) Jaidip Mukerjea	6–4, 6–0, 6–3
1964	New Delhi	(India) Ramanathan Krishnan (8)	(United Kingdom) Alan Mills	6–1, 6–3, 6–4
1965	New Delhi	(India) Ramanathan Krishnan (9)	(Australia) Martin Mulligan	w.o.
1966	New Delhi	(India) Jaidip Mukerjea	(India) Premjit Lall	4–6, 6–3, 6–4, 6–0
1967	New Delhi	(India) Premjit Lall	(India) Ramanathan Krishnan	3–6, 7–5, 5–7, 2–1 rtd.
Open era
Northern India and Punjab State Championships
1969	Amritsar	(Poland) Tadeusz Nowicki	(India) Premjit Lall	6–1, 3–6, 6–4, 3–6, 6–4
1970	Amritsar	(Socialist Federal Republic of Yugoslavia) Zlatko Ivancic	(Soviet Union) Alex Metreveli	6–3, 6–4

=== Women's singles ===
Incomplete roll included.

Year	Location	Winner	Runner-up	Score
Northern India Championships
1936	Lahore	(British Raj) Meher Dubash	(United Kingdom) Dorothy Haydon Crouch	6–1, 6–3
1937	Lahore	(British Raj) Leela Row	(British Raj) Meher Dubash	?
1938	Lahore	(British Raj) Mrs E.H. Edney	(United Kingdom) Dorothy Haydon Crouch	6–4, 6–3
1941/1944	Not held (due to World War II)			
1950	New Delhi	(United States) Gussie Moran	(United States) Pat Canning Todd	6–1, 4–6, 6–1
1953	New Delhi	(India) Rita Davar	(India) Urmila Thapar	6–4, 9–7
1955	New Delhi	(Pakistan) Parveen Sheikh	(India) Urmila Thapar	6–4, 5–7, 6–1
1957	Delhi	(India) Khanum Haji Singh	(India) Mrs. J.B. Singh	4–6, 7–5, 6–1
Northern India and India National Championships
1960	New Delhi	(Australia) Margaret Hellyer	(United States) Mimi Arnold	4–6, 7–5, 6–0
1962	New Delhi	(Australia) Lesley Turner	(Australia) Madonna Schacht	6–1, 6–3
1966	New Delhi	(Estonia) Tiiu Soome	(New Zealand) Marion Law	6-2, 3–6, 6–4
1967	New Delhi	(Soviet Union) Alla Ivanova	(Soviet Union) Rena Abjandadze	8–6, 6–3
Open era
Northern India and Punjab State Championships
1969	Amritsar	(Romania) Judith Dibar	(United States) Alice Tym	6–1, 5–7, 7–5
1970	Amritsar	(Soviet Union) Aleksandra Ivanova	(Socialist Federal Republic of Yugoslavia) Irena Škulj	6–1, 6–3
