= All India Hard Court Championships =

Defunct tennis tournament
- Founded: 1947; 79 years ago
- Abolished: 1972; 54 years ago
- Location: Various
- Venue: Various
- Surface: Clay

The All India Hard Court Championships, also known as the All India Hard Court Tennis Championships, was a combined men's and women's clay court tennis tournament founded in 1947. The championships were first played at the Madras Gymkhana Club grounds, Madras, Tamil Nadu, India. The championships ran until 1972 before it was discontinued as part of the worldwide tennis circuit.

== History ==
Tennis was introduced to India in the 1880s by British Army and Civilian Officers. In 1947 the All India Tennis Association established a national level tournament called the All India Hard Court Championships. In 1947, 1955 and 1959 this tournament was held in conjunction with the Western India Championships. In 1948, 1954 and 1956 it was held in conjunction with the Southern India Championships. The championships were staged until 1972 when they were discontinued as part of the worldwide tennis circuit.

== Locations ==
The championships were staged mainly in Madras, but also throughout India in different locations such as; Amaravati, Bombay, Hyderabad and Trivandrum.

== Past finals ==
=== Men's singles ===
Year	Champion	Runner-up	Score
1947	(India) Narendra Nath	(India) Khan-Iftikhar Ahmed	6-4, 6-4, 6-3
1948	(Sweden) Lennart Bergelin	(Sweden) Torsten Johansson	5-7, 6-3, 6-4, 2-6, 6-2
1949	(India) G. Vasant	(India) P. L. Narayanarao	6-3, 6-2, 6-2
1950	(Belgium) Philippe Washer	(Philippines) Raymundo Deyro	6-3, 6-4, 6-2
1951	(Sweden) Sven Davidson	(United States) Fred Kovaleski	6-1, 3-6, 6-4, 4-6, 6-3
1952	(Sweden) Lennart Bergelin	(Japan) Atsushi Miyagi	4-6, 6-4, 6-2, 4-6, 6-4
1954	(Australia) Jack Arkinstall	(India) Ramanathan Krishnan	6-4, 6-3, 4-6, 6-2
1955	(India) Ramanathan Krishnan	(Australia) Jack Arkinstall	6-2, 0-6, 3-6, 6-1, 6-3
1956	(Australia) Jack Arkinstall	(United States) Bob Perry	6-4, 6-4, 6-4
1957	(India) Arcot Uday Kumar	(India) Govindji Vasant	1-6, 5-7, 6-2, 6-3, 6-2
1958	(India) Ramanathan Krishnan	(Sweden) Ulf Schmidt	2-6, 7-5, 5-7, 7-5, 8-6
1959	(India) Ramanathan Krishnan	(Italy) Giuseppe Merlo	6-4, 6-3, 6-4
1960	(India) Ramanathan Krishnan	(Sweden) Ulf Schmidt	6-2, 6-3, 6-2
1962	(India) Ramanathan Krishnan (Australia) Neale Fraser	Krishnan led 19-17; Title shared	
1965	(India) Ramanathan Krishnan	(India) Jaidip Mukerjea	6-3, 10-8, 7-5
1966	(Soviet Union) Alex Metreveli	(Greece) Nicky Kalogeropoulos	7-5, 4-6, 6-8, 6-4, 6-1
1968	(Soviet Union) Alex Metreveli	(Romania) Ion Țiriac	11-9, 6-3, 6-2
1969	(Romania) Ilie Nastase	(India) Premjit Lall	4-6, 6-2, 6-3, 7-5
1970	(Hungary) István Gulyás	(Soviet Union) Alex Metreveli	3-6, 6-4, 6-4, 6-0
1971	(India) Anand Amritraj	(India) Gaurav Misra	2-6, 6-3, 7-5, 10-12, 6-4
1972	(India) Ramanathan Krishnan	(India) Jaidip Mukerjea	w/o

=== Women's singles ===
(incomplete roll)

Year	Champion	Runner-Up	Score
1969	(Romania) Judith Dibar	(United States) Alice Tym	6–1, 5–7, 7–5
1970	(Soviet Union) Nina Turkherelli	(Socialist Federal Republic of Yugoslavia) Irena Škulj	6–4, 6–4

== See also ==
- Category:National and multi-national tennis tournaments
