= National Lawn Tennis Championships of India =

Defunct tennis tournament
- Tour: Grand Prix circuit
- Founded: 1910
- Abolished: 1999
- Location: Various; India
- Surface: Clay, Grass, Hard

The National Lawn Tennis Championships of India, originally called the All India Championships, or the All India Lawn Tennis Championships and the Indian National Championships, was a combined (men's and women's) tennis tournament. It was played from 1910 until 1999. It was held in various cities in, India and was played outdoor on multiple surfaces, but mainly grass courts.

Ramanathan Krishnan won most men's singles championships with eight titles overall, and, during the pre-Open era Jenny Sandison and Leela Row won the most women's singles championships with seven titles each, while Nirupama Mankad won the most titles during the open era with five titles.

== History ==
Lawn tennis in India can be traced back within the first decade of the establishment of the Wimbledon championships with early local championships being established in places like Punjab (1885) and Calcutta (1887). However, there was no national championships, in 1910 colonial officers of the British Raj established the All India Lawn Tennis Championships in Allahabad which was 10 years before the All India Tennis Association was founded. The championships staged both men's and women's singles play and also doubles. In 1946, the All-India Championships tournament was renamed the National Lawn Tennis Championships of India by the India Lawn Tennis Association. After World War 2 until the start of the open era, the event was often held over Christmas and new year and on a few occasions two events were held in a single year in January and December (sometimes winners are described as winning in a year in which an event started in late December, other times in the year the event finished in early January).

The tournament was hosted at different cities around India and was also played on different surfaces, such as grass courts (1910–59, 1964–66, 1969, 1970, 1973), hard courts (1967) and clay courts (1960–61, 1974–79). This tournament was also held in conjunction with the Northern India Championships for the years 1962 to 1967. In the open era the event became a minor event for Indian players.

== Finals ==
Incomplete roll included:

=== Men's singles ===
Year	Champions	Runners-up	Score
All India Championships
1910	(United Kingdom) Edmund Atkinson	(India) Lewis Deane	7–5, 7–5, 7–5
1911	(United Kingdom) H. W. Davies	(United Kingdom) John Rendall	?
1912	(United Kingdom) H. W. Davies (2)	(United Kingdom) H. Nelson-Wright	6–0, 6–3, 2–6, 4–6, 6–1(2)
1913	(United Kingdom) Edmund Atkinson	(India) ?	?
1914	(United Kingdom) Edmund Atkinson (2)	(India) ?	?
1915	(India) ?	(India) ?	?
1916	(India) Mohammed Sleem	(India) Udupi Diggavi Ranga Rao	6–2, 6–1
1917–18	Not held		
1919	(India) Mr.Nagu	(India) ?	?
1921	(India) Edward Vivian Bobb	(India) ?	?
1922	(India) Mohammed Sleem (2)	(Australia) Harry Lewis-Barclay	8–6, 6–1, 6–1
1923	(India) S.K. Mukerji	(India) Sandford Wilson Bobb	6–3, 6–4, 3–6, 6–4
1924	(United Kingdom) Eric Burn Andreae	(India) Sri-Krishna Prasada	8–6, 7–5, 7–5
1925	(India) Eric Burn Andreae (2)	(India) Jagat Mohan Lal	6–4, 6–3, 6–8, 6–4
1926	(India) Edward Vivian Bobb (2)	(India) Sri-Krishna Prasada	6–2, 4–6, 4–6, 6–2, 7–5
1927	(India) Edward Vivian Bobb (3)	(India) Dip Narain Kapoor	5–7, 7–5, 8–6, 6–3
1928–29	Not held		
1930	(India) Edward Vivian Bobb (4)	(India) Dip Narain Kapoor	6–4, 5–7, 6–3, 6–2
1931	(India) Dip Narain Kapoor	(India) Ahad Hussain	3–6, 7–5, 5–7, 6–2, 6–1
1932	(India) Dip Narain Kapoor (2)	(India) Ahad Hussain	6–0, 6–2, 6–2
1933	(India) Edward Vivian Bobb (5)	(India) Sohan Lal	5–7, 3–6, 6–3, 6–1, 10–8
1934	(India) Sohan Lal	(India) Edward Vivian Bobb	6–2, 3–6, 6–1, 6–8, 6–2
1935	(Socialist Federal Republic of Yugoslavia) Josip Palada	(Socialist Federal Republic of Yugoslavia) Franjo Punčec	4–6, 7–5, 6–3, 6–2
1936	(First Czechoslovak Republic) Ladislav Hecht	(First Czechoslovak Republic) Roderich Menzel	2–6, 3–6, 6–4, 6–1, 5–5 ret.
1937	(India) Edward Vivian Bobb (6)	(India) Dip Narain Kapoor	6–4, 7–5, 6–3
1938	(India) Dip Narain Kapoor (3)	(India) Islam Ahmad	8–6, 6–4, 6–4
1939	(India) Ghaus Mohammad	(India) Tenkasi K. Ramanathan	6–1, 6–2
1940	(Socialist Federal Republic of Yugoslavia) Franjo Punčec	(India) Yudishtra Singh	11-9. 6–4, 7–5
1941	(India) Ghaus Mohammad (2)	(India) Iftikhar Ahmed Khan	6–0, 6–3, 7–5
1942	(India) Subba L.R. Sawhney	(India) Prem Lal Pandhi	6–1, 6–1, 6–0
1943	(India) Ghaus Mohammad (3)	(India) Iftikhar Ahmed Khan	6–2, 7–5, 4–6, 6–3
1944	(United States) Hal Surface	(India) Ghaus Mohammad	6–2, 6–4, 6–0
1945	(India) Sumant Misra	(India) B.R. Kapinipathy	9–7, 9–7, 5–7, 6–0
1946	(India) Ghaus Mohammad (4)	(India) Dilip Bose	7–5, 3–6, 6–3, 6–3
1947	(India) Sumant Misra (2)	(India) Man-Mohan Bhandari	4–6, 6–3, 6–2, 6–0
National Lawn Tennis Championships of India
1948	(Sweden) Lennart Bergelin	(India) Sumant Misra	8–6, 6–1, 6–4
1949	(India) Dilip Bose	(India) Sumant Misra	3–6, 6–3, 6–3, 8–6
1950	(Philippines) Felicisimo Ampon	(Spain) Pedro Masip	5–7, 8–6, 8–6, 6–1
1951	(Sweden) Sven Davidson	(Czechoslovakia) Jaroslav Drobný	6–3, 6–3 7–5
1952	(Sweden) Sven Davidson (2)	(Pakistan) Khan-Iftikhar Ahmed	6–3, 6–4, 8–6
1953	(India) Sumant Misra (3)	(India) Naresh Kumar	6–8, 2–6, 6–3, 9–7, 6–3
1954	(India) Ramanathan Krishnan	(Australia) Jack Arkinstall	6–2, 6–3, 7–5
1955	(Australia) Jack Arkinstall	(India) Ramanathan Krishnan	3–6, 6–3, 3–6, 6–2, 6–3
1956	(Sweden) Sven Davidson	(Denmark) Kurt Nielsen	6–4, 6–1, 15–17, 6–4
1957	(India) Ramanathan Krishnan (2)	(India) Naresh Kumar	6–4, 6–0, 8–6
1958	(Sweden) Ulf Schmidt	(India) Ramanathan Krishnan	6–2, 6–2, 4–6, 4–6, 6–3
1959	(India) Ramanathan Krishnan (3)	(India) Naresh Kumar	6–2, 6–2, 6–1
1960	(India) Ramanathan Krishnan (4)	(Sweden) Ulf Schmidt	6–3, 6–3 6–1
1961	(India) Ramanathan Krishnan (5)	(Brazil) Carlos Fernandes	6–2, 6–2, 3–6, 7–5
India National and Northern India Championships
1962	(Australia) Roy Emerson	(India) Ramanathan Krishnan	6–4, 6–4, 6–3
1963	(India) Ramanathan Krishnan (6)	(India) Jaidip Mukerjea	6–4, 6–0, 6–3
1964	(India) Ramanathan Krishnan (7)	(United Kingdom) Alan Mills	6–1, 6–3, 6–4
1965	(India) Ramanathan Krishnan (8)	(Australia) Martin Mulligan	w.o.
1966	(India) Jaidip Mukerjea	(India) Premjit Lall	4–6, 6–3, 6–4, 6–0
1967	(India) Premjit Lall	(India) Ramanathan Krishnan	3–6, 7–5, 5–7, 2–1 rtd.
National Lawn Tennis Championships of India
1968	(India) Premjit Lall (2)		
Open era
1969	(Romania) Ilie Năstase	(India) Premjit Lall	6–4, 6–2, 4–6, 6–4
1970	(India) Premjit Lall (3)	(Soviet Union) Alex Metreveli	9–7, 6–0, 5–7 6–3
1971	(India) Jaidip Mukerjea (2)	(India) Premjit Lall	7-5, 6-3, 6-3
1972	(India) Gaurav Misra	(India) Ramanathan Krishnan	4–6, 6–4, 8–10, 7–5, 6–2
1973	(India) Vijay Amritraj	(India) Ramanathan Krishnan	?
1974	(India) Anand Amritraj	?	?
1975	(India) Vijay Amritraj (2)	(India) Chiradip Mukerje ?	?
1976	(United States) Tom Gorman	(India) Sashi Menon	?
1977	(India) Ramesh Krishnan	(India) Jasjit Singh	3-6, 7-5, 6-4
1978	(India) Ramesh Krishnan (2)	?	?
1979	(India) Bidyut Goswami	(India) Shanker Krishnan	6-3, 6-4, 6-4
1980	(India) Sashi Menon	?	?
1981	(India) Sashi Menon (2)	?	?
1982	(India) Srinivasan Vasudevan	(India) Jay Royappa	6-1, 6-1
1983	(India) Nandan Bal	(India) Enrico Piperno	4-6, 7-6, 7-6
1984	(India) Nandan Bal (2)	(India) Enrico Piperno	4-6, 7-6, 7-6, 6-3
1985	(India) Nandan Bal (3)	(India) Enrico Piperno	6-4, 7-5
1986	(India) Zeeshan Ali	?	?
1987	(India) Zeeshan Ali (2)	?	?
1988	(India) Zeeshan Ali (3)	?	?
1989	(India) Zeeshan Ali (4)	?	?
1990	(India) Leander Paes	?	?
1991	(India) Zeeshan Ali (5)	?	?
1992	(India) Gaurav Natekar	?	?
1993	(India) Asif Ismail	?	?
1994	(India) Mahesh Bhupathi	?	?
1995	(India) Mahesh Bhupathi (2)	?	?
1996	(India) Nitin Kirtane	?	?
1997	(Germany) Marcus Hilpert	?	?
1998	(Germany) Marcus Hilpert (2)	?	?
1999	(India) Syed Fazaluddin	?	?

=== Women's singles ===
Year	Champion	Runner up	Score
All India Championships
1910	(India) Mrs Kendall	(India) Mrs Hutchinson	6–3, 6–3
1911	(India) Miss Warburton	(India) Miss Latham	(score?)
1912	(India) Mrs Adams	(India) Mrs Leslie-Jones	6–0, 6–3
1913	(India) Miss Warburton	(India) Mrs Leslie-Jones	6–4, 6–3
1914	(India) Mrs Leslie-Jones	(India) Mrs Fremantle	6–2, 6–0
1915–18	No event WW1		
1919	(India) Mrs Dickens	(India) Mrs Simpson	6–1, 6–3
1920	(India) Mrs Kellie	?	6–3, 9-11, 6–1
1921	(India) Mrs Kemble	?	?
1922	(United Kingdom) Phyllis Howkins Covell	(United Kingdom) Dorothy Shepherd-Barron	6–3, 7–5 *
1923	(India) Winifred MacClellan Keays	(India) Mrs O'Neill	6–2, 6–3
1924	(India) Yolande Mackinnon	(India) Mrs T. Horn	6–3, 6–3
1925	(India) Lena McKenna	(India) Phyllis Cox Berthoud	6–2, 6–4
1926	(India) Lena McKenna (2)	(India) Miss Holden	6–3, 1–6, 6–1
1927	(India) Jenny Sandison	(India) Lena McKenna	8–6, 6–4
1928	Abandoned		
1929	(India) Jenny Sandison (2)	(United States) Elizabeth Ryan	?
1930	(India) Jenny Sandison (3)	(India) Lena McKenna	6–3, 6–0
1931	(India) Leela Row	(India) Lena McKenna	6–1, 6–1
1932	(India) Jenny Sandison (4)	(India) Leela Row	7–5, 6–3
1933	(India) Jenny Sandison(5)	(India) Leela Row	3–6, 6–2, 6–1
1934	(India) Jenny Sandison (6)	(India) Hyacinth Harvey-Johnston	6–2, 6–3
1935	(India) Jenny Sandison (7)	(India) Margaret Parrott	6–2, 6–3
1936	(India) Leela Row (2)	(India) Rosie Gibson	6–1, 6–0
1937	(India) Leela Row (3)	(United Kingdom) Joan Fry Lakeman	2–6, 9–7, 6–2
1938	(India) Leela Row (4)	(India) Meher Dubash	6–1, 6–2
1939	(India) Gaby Curtis	(India) Laura Woodbridge	6–2, 6–8, 9–7
1940	(India) Leela Row (5)	(India) Laura Woodbridge	6–3, 6–2
1941	(India) Leela Row (6)	(India) Meher Dubash	6–4, 6–1
1942	(India) Mrs. Massey	(India) Leela Row	2–6, 7–5, 6–2
1943	(India) Leela Row (7)	(India) Meher Dubash	
1944	(India) Laura Woodbridge	(India) Miss Maguire	6–1, 6–1
1945	(India) Laura Woodbridge (2)	(Dominion of Ceylon) Doreen Sansoni	3–6, 6–2, 6–0
1946	(Dominion of Ceylon) Doreen Sansoni	(India) Sarah Mody	6–1, 10–12, 6–0
1947	(India) Khanum Haji Singh	(India) Laura Woodbridge	w.o.
National Lawn Tennis Championships of India
1948	(India) Khanum Haji Singh (2)	(India) Promilla Khanna	6–4, 6–4
1949	(India) Khanum Haji Singh (3)	(India) Promilla Khanna	3–6, 9–7, 6–3
1950	(United States) Pat Canning Todd	(United States) Gussie Moran	6–2, 6–2
1951	(United States) Dorothy Head	(United Kingdom) Joy Mottram	6–3, 4–6, 6–3
1952	(India) Urmila Thapar	(India) Laura Woodbridge	6–0, 4–6, 7–5
1953	(India) Rita Davar	(United Kingdom) Joy Mottram	6–2, 6–1
1954	(India) Rita Davar (2)	(India) Urmila Thapar	0–6, 6–2, 6–2
1955	(India) Rita Davar (3)	(India) Urmila Thapar	6–4, 6–1
1956	(United States) Althea Gibson	(Japan) Saichiko Kamo	6–2, 6–2
1957	(India) Khanum Haji Singh (4)	(India) Promilla Khanna Singh	7–5, 7–5
1958	(India) Promilla Khanna Singh	(India) Leela Panjabi	6–2, 6–3
1959	(India) Dechu Appaiah	(India) Khanum Haji Singh	2–6, 7–5, 6–2
1960	(Australia) Margaret Hellyer	(United States) Mimi Arnold	4–6, 7–5, 6–0
1961	(Australia) Margaret Hellyer (2)	(India) Dechu Appaiah	6–4, 6–2
India National and Northern India Championships
1962	(Australia) Lesley Turner	(Australia) Madonna Schacht	6–1, 6–3
1963	(India) Rattan Thadani	(India) Cherri Chettyanna	6–2, 6–2
1964	(United Kingdom) Jill Rook Mills	(India) Lakshmi Mahadevan	6–3, 4–6, 6–4
1965	(New Zealand) Marion Law	(India) Nirupama Vasant	6–4, 6–4
1966	(Estonia) Tiiu Soome	(New Zealand) Marion Law	6–2, 3–6, 6–4
1967	(Soviet Union) Rena Abzhandadze	(Soviet Union) Aleksandra Ivanova	6–4, 6–0
National Lawn Tennis Championships of India
1968	(Soviet Union) Aleksandra Ivanova	(Soviet Union) Nina Turkheli	6–1, 6–2
Open era
1969	(Romania) Judith Dibar	(United States) Alice Luthy Tym	6–2, 6–1
1970	(Soviet Union) Aleksandra Ivanova (2)	(Socialist Federal Republic of Yugoslavia) Irena Škulj	6–1, 6–3
1971	(India) Nirupama Mankad	(India) Kiran Peshawaria	4–6, 6–1, 6–1
1972	(Australia) Marilyn Tesch	(India) Nirupama Mankad	6–4, 6–2
1973	(India) Udaya Kumar	(India) Kiran Peshawaria Bedi	6–2, 7–5
1974	(India) Susan Das	(India) Nirupama Vasant Mankad	(score?)
1975	(India) Nirupama Mankad (2)	(India) Susan Das	7–5, 6–4
1976	(India) Nirupama Mankad (3)	(India) Susan Das	6–4, 6–3
1977	(India) Nirupama Mankad (4)	(India) Susan Das	6–4, 6–3
1978	(India) Nirupama Mankad (5)	(India) Amreeta Ahluwalia	3–6, 6–1, 8–6
1979	(India) Amreeta Ahluwalia	(India) Anu Peshawaria	6–4, 6–0
1980	(India) Amreeta Ahluwalia (2)	(India) Anu Peshawaria	6–0, 6–3
1981	(India) Amreeta Ahluwalia (3)	(India) Anu Peshawaria	6–1, 6–4
1982	(India) Anu Peshawaria (4)	(India) Namratha Appa Rao	6–4, 6–3

== Venues ==
The tournament was staged in different cities for the duration of its run they included:

Host city	years staged
Allahabad	1910–1938, 1944, 1946–1949, 1950–1951
Bombay	1939, 1974, 1977, 1979
Calcutta	1940, 1952–1953, 1955, 1957–1959, 1963 1964–1965, 1967, 1975, 1978
Baroda	1941
Lahore	1942
Indore	1943
Madras	1944, 1945, 1954
New Delhi	1956, 1960–1962, 1966, 1969, 1970, 1980, 1982
Bangalore	1976
Pune	1981

== Records ==
Included:

=== Men's singles ===
- Most titles: (India) Ramanathan Krishnan (8 titles)
- Most finals: (India) Ramanathan Krishnan (10 finals)
- Most consecutive titles: (India) Edward Vivian Bobb (3 titles) (1927–27, 1930)
- Most consecutive finals: (India) Ramanathan Krishnan, (4 finals) (1957–60)
- Most matches played: (India) Vijay Amritraj (26)
- Most matches won: (India) Vijay Amritraj (24)
- Most consecutive matches won: (India) Edward Vivian Bobb (13)
- Most editions played: (India) Premjit Lall (11)
- Best match winning %: (India) Edward Vivian Bobb, 92.8%, (pre-open era)
- Best match winning %: (India) Vijay Amritraj, 92.3%, (open era)
- Oldest champion: (Australia) Jack Arkinstall, 34y 7m & 26d (1954)
- Youngest champion: (India) Ramanathan Krishnan, 16y 8m & 17d (1954)

=== Women's singles ===
- Most titles Pre Open era: (India) Jenny Sandison/ (India) Leela Row (7)
- Most titles Open era: (India) Nirupama Mankad (5)

== See also ==
- Indian Open

== Sources ==
- Majumdar, Boria; Mangan, J. A. (2013). Sport in South Asian Society: Past and Present. Routledge. ISBN 9781317998945.
- http://www.tennisarchives.com/All India Championships 1910–1956
- https://app.thetennisbase.com/All India Championships draws 1910–1979
