= Asian Championships (tennis) =

Defunct tennis tournament
- Tour: ILTF World Circuit (1949–72); ILTF Independent Tour (1970-73) men (1971-73) women
- Founded: 1949; 76 years ago
- Abolished: 1973; 52 years ago
- Location: Bangalore; Calcutta; Colombo; Hong Kong; Lahore; Manila; New Delhi; Poona; Singapore
- Venue: Various
- Surface: Clay; Grass

The Asian Championships also known as the Asian International Championships or Asian Lawn Tennis Championships was an open international men's and women's grass and clay court tennis tournament founded in 1949 as the International Championships of Asia. The tournament was one of eight official championships of the International Lawn Tennis Federation. It was first played at the Calcutta South Club, Calcutta, India. The international tournament was played at other locations until September 1972 when it was discontinued as part of the ILTF Independent Tour.

In December 1972 the format for the open event was changed to a closed event (Asian players only) and played as team only competition called the Asian Amateur Championships whereby a country sends teams of players to compete in singles, doubles and mixed doubles events. Unlike the Davis Cup its not a round robin tournament. It was first played at Kings Park, Kowloon, Hong Kong. The tournament was played at other locations until 1973 when it was discontinued as part of the ILTF Independent Tour.

== History ==
On 22 December 1949 the International Championships of Asia were inaugurated at the Calcutta South Club, Calcutta, India. The tournament was concluded on 1 January 1950 the first winners of the singles events were Indian player Dilip Kumar Bose, and American player Patricia Canning Todd. In 1968 the men's edition was held in Calcutta, the women's in Bangalore. The open Asian Championships ran annually until 1972 when it was last held in Poona, India, that year two editions of the tournament were held the normal winter edition, and a one off summer event called the Asian Championships Invitation. The final winners of open international winter edition in the singles events were the Indian player Jaidip Mukerjea (men's), the Indian player Kiran Peshawaria (women's).

The summer edition of this tournament was played in Singapore. The winner of the men's singles in the invitation event was Ramanathan Krishnan. This tournament was then discontinued from the ILTF Independent Tour. The championships were held in the following locations throughout its run in Bangalore, Calcutta, Colombo, Lahore, Manila, New Delhi, Poona and Singapore. The ILTF Independent Tour, a series of worldwide tournaments not part of the men's Grand Prix Circuit or women's the WTA Tour

In July 1971 at an annual general meeting of the ILTF it was decided to change the format of the open international championships and make it a closed Asian only team event. The ILTF provided the finances to stage the event that was to be held from 20 to 26 February 1972 at King's Park, Kowloon in then what was British Hong Kong. Thirteen countries were invited to send teams including Hong Kong, India, Indonesia, Ian, Japan, Korea, Malaysia, Philippines, Singapore, Sri Lanka, Taiwan, Thailand and Vietnam.

The Asian Amateur Championships were held only once the winner of the men's singles event was won by Japan's Toshiro Sakai (men's), and the doubles event was won by Japan's Toshiro Sakai and Jun Kamiwazumi.

== Asian International Championships (open) ==
=== Finals ===
==== Men's singles (winter) ====
(incomplete roll)

Asian Championships
Year	Location	Champions	Runners-up	Score
1949	Calcutta	(India) Dilip Kumar Bose	(India) Sumant 'tiny' Misra	6–1, 6–2, 8–6.
1950	Lahore	(Egypt) Jaroslav Drobný	(United States) Fred Kovaleski	6–3, 4–6, 6–4, 6–4.
1952	Colombo	(Australia) Frank Sedgman	(United Kingdom) Tony Mottram	6–4, 4–6, 7–5, 6–3.
1954	Manila	(Sweden) Lennart Bergelin	(Philippines) Felicisimo Ampon	6–3, 5–7, 6–2, 6–0.
1955	Calcutta	(Denmark) Kurt Nielsen	(Australia) Jack Arkinstall	6–2, 6–4, 6–1.
1957	Colombo	(Egypt) Jaroslav Drobný	(Australia) Warren Woodcock	6–1, 6–2, 6–4.
1958	Lahore	(Denmark) Torben Ulrich	(France) Robert Haillet	6–4, 6–2, 6–2.
1959	Calcutta	(India) Ramanathan Krishnan	(United States) Barry MacKay (tennis)	7–5, 4–6, 6–3, 6–3.
1962	Calcutta	(Australia) Roy Emerson	(India) Ramanathan Krishnan	7–5, 6–4, 6–3.
1963	Calcutta	(India) Ramanathan Krishnan (2)	(India) Jaidip Mukerjea	6–4, 6–2, 6–4.
1964	Calcutta	(India) Ramanathan Krishnan (3)	(India) Jaidip Mukerjea	6–4, 6–3, 6–2.
1965	Calcutta	(India) Ramanathan Krishnan (4)	(South Africa) Bob Hewitt	6–2, 6–1, 6–4.
1966	Calcutta	(India) Jaidip Mukerjea	(India) Ramanathan Krishnan	6–4, 6–3, 6–2.
1967	Calcutta	(Soviet Union) Alexander Metreveli	(Egypt) Ismail El Shafei	6–3, 8–6, 6–4.
1968	Calcutta	(Soviet Union) Alexander Metreveli (2)	(Romania) Ion Țiriac	8–6, 6–3, 6–4.
↓ Open era ↓
1969	Calcutta	(India) Jaidip Mukerjea (2)	(United States) Bill Tym	6–2, 6–1, 6–0.
1970	New Delhi	(Soviet Union) Alexander Metreveli (3)	(India) Premjit Lall	6–3, 6–4, 2–6, 3–6, 6–3.
1972	Poona	(India) Jaidip Mukerjea (2)	(India) Vijay Amritraj	1–6, 6–3, 6–4, 6–4.

==== Men's singles (summer) ====
Asian Championships Invitation
Year	Location	Champions	Runners-up	Score
1972	Singapore	(India) Ramanathan Krishnan	(Philippines) Eduardo 'Eddie' Cruz	6–2, 11–9, 6–1.

==== Women's singles ====
(incomplete roll)

Asian Championships
Year	Location	Champions	Runners-up	Score
1949	Calcutta	(United States) Patricia Canning Todd	(United Kingdom) Betty Hilton	6–4, 6–0
1950	Lahore	(United States) Dorothy Head	(United Kingdom) Joy Gannon Mottram	4–6, 6–2, 6–3
1952	Colombo	(United States) Doris Hart	(United States) Shirley Fry	6–4, 2–6, 6–1
1954	Manila	(Japan) Sachiko Kamo	(Philippines) Desideria Ampon	6–2, 6–4
1956	Calcutta	(United States) Althea Gibson	(Japan) Sachiko Kamo	6–3, 9–11, 6–2
1957	Colombo	(United States) Althea Gibson (2)	(United Kingdom) Patricia Ward	6–0, 13–11
1958	Lahore	(United States) Louise Snow	(Pakistan) Parveen Ahmed	6–3, 6–4
1960	Calcutta	(Australia) Margaret Hellyer	(United States) Mimi Arnold	3–6, 6–1, 7–5
1962	Calcutta	(Australia) Lesley Turner	(Australia) Madonna Schacht	8–6, 6–2
1963	Calcutta	(India) Cherri Chettyanna	(India) Rattan Thadani	6–1, 1–6, 6–3
1964	Calcutta	(India) Lakshmi Mahadevan	(United Kingdom) Jill Rook Mills	6–3, 6–2
1965	Calcutta	(India) Nirupama Vasant	(India) Lakshmi Mahadevan	6–2, 6–4
1966	Calcutta	(Soviet Union) Tiiu Soome	(United States) Carol Ann Prosen	6–3, 1–6, 6–1
1967	Calcutta	(Soviet Union) Rena Abjandadze	(Soviet Union) Alla Ivanova	6–4, 6–0
1968	Bangalore	(Soviet Union) Alla Ivanova	(Soviet Union) Nina Tukherli	6–1, 6–2
↓ Open era ↓
1969	Calcutta	(India) Nirupama Vasant (2)	(United States) Alice Tym	6–1, 3–6, 6–3
1970	New Delhi	(Soviet Union) Rena Abjandadze (2)	(Soviet Union) Alla Ivanova	9–7, 6–3
1972	Poona	(India) Kiran Peshawaria	(India) Susan Das	6–2, 6–0

== Asian Amateur Championships (closed) ==
=== Finals ===
==== Men's singles ====
Asian Amateur Championships
Year	Location	Champions	Runners-up	Score
1972	Hong Kong	(Japan) Toshiro Sakai	(India) Vijay Amritraj	6–4, 3–6, 6–3, 5–7, 7–5 .
1973	Manila	(Japan) Toshiro Sakai (2)	(India) Chiradip Mukerjea	4–6, 2–6, 6–0, 6–2, 6–3.

==== Men's doubles ====
Asian Amateur Championships
Year	Location	Champions	Runners-up	Score
1972	Hong Kong	(Japan) Toshiro Sakai (Japan) Jun Kamiwazumi	(India) Anand Amritraj (India) Vijay Amritraj	6–4, 4–6, 6–4 .

== Tournament records ==
=== Men's singles ===
Included:

- Most Titles: (India) Ramanathan Krishnan (5)
- Most Finals: (India) Ramanathan Krishnan (7)
- Most Consecutive Titles: (India) Ramanathan Krishnan (3)
- Most Consecutive Finals: (India) Ramanathan Krishnan (4)

=== Women's singles ===
- Most Titles: (United States) Althea Gibson & (India) Nirupama Vasant & (Soviet Union) Rena Abjandadze (2)
- Most Finals: (United States) Althea Gibson & (India) Nirupama Vasant & (Soviet Union) Rena Abjandadze (2)
- Most Consecutive Titles: (United States) Althea Gibson (2)
- Most Consecutive Finals: (United States) Althea Gibson (2)

== See also ==
- Category:National and multi-national tennis tournaments
