= All India Tennis Association =

Tennis organization in India

- Sport: Tennis
- Jurisdiction: India
- Abbreviation: AITA
- Founded: 1920; 106 years ago
- Affiliation: International Tennis Federation
- Regional affiliation: Asian Tennis Federation
- Headquarters: R.K. Khanna Tennis Complex
- Location: African Avenue, Delhi
- President: Anil Jain

Official website
- aitatennis.com
- (India)

The All India Tennis Association, a.k.a. AITA, is the governing body of tennis in India. It was established in 1920 and affiliated by International Tennis Federation and Asian Tennis Federation.

All India Tennis Association operates all of the Indian national representative tennis sides, including the India Davis Cup team, the India Fed Cup team and youth sides as well. AITA is also responsible for organising and hosting tennis tournaments within India and scheduling the home international fixtures.

== History ==
Tennis was introduced in India in the 1880s by British Army and civilian officers. Saleem of Lahore won the Punjab Championship in 1915 and thereafter consecutively from 1919 to 1926. In 1917 NS Iyer lifted the Bengal Championship. In 1919 Mr. Nagu picked up the prestigious singles crown at the All India Tennis Championship at City's Gymkhana Club at Allahabad. Henceforth, Indians started playing the game with greater distinction.

In March 1920 the All India Lawn Tennis Association was formed at Lahore. At this meeting the constitution and game laws were framed, along the lines of the Lawn Tennis Association of Britain. In November 1920, the first AGM of AILTA was held at the town hall at Delhi. Samuel Perry O'Donnell, a British member of the Indian Civil Service (ICS) was elected as the first president. In this meeting, it was decided to hold the annual 'All India National Championships' at Allahabad and to participate in Davis Cup competition. In its debut, Indian team consisting of SM Jacob, Mohd Saleem, LS Deane and AA Fayzee upset a stronger French team to reach the semi-finals. With AITA at the helm of affairs, different provinces formed Provincial Associations (now known as State Associations and were affiliated to parent organisation. An Inter Provincial Tournament was organised with effect from 1922. Punjab LTA led by Mohd Saleem became the first champions. This yearly competition continued till the eve of the Second World War (1939).

Around the early 1980s the name of the association was changed to the All India Tennis Association. From the beginning of the 1990s tennis in India has started getting a new look. The financial position of the association has improved considerably. The association constructed a full-fledged modern national stadium in Delhi with a seating capacity of 5000 spectators in 1996.

== Headquarters ==
The AITA organisation has its headquarters in Delhi's R.K. Khanna Tennis Complex. Until 1996, the organisation was functioning from temporary places.

== London Olympics ==
On 15 June 2012, the All India Tennis Association chose Leander Paes and Mahesh Bhupathi for the men's doubles event of the London Olympics.

== Format of tournaments ==
AITA conducts the following types of tournaments:

- Talent Series
- Championship Series
- Super Series
- National Series
- Two Nationals (hard court, clay)

== Tournaments ==
Listed below are tournaments that are/were part of the federation calendar.

=== National ===
- All India Covered Court Championships
- All India Hard Court Championships
- All India Lawn Tennis Championships
- India International Championships
- India National and Northern India Championships
- India Professional Championships
- Indian Open
- National Lawn Tennis Championships of India
- Tennis Premier League
- Harven Pro Tennis League

=== Regional ===
- Central India Championships
- East India and All Assam Hardcourts
- East India Championships
- Northern India Championships
- North West India Championships
- Southern India Championships
- South West India Championships
- Upper India Championships
- Western India Championships

=== State ===
- Andhra Pradesh State Championships
- Bengal Championships
- Hyderabad State Championships
- Kerala State Championships
- Madhya Pradesh State Championships
- Madras State Championships
- Mysore State Championships
- Punjab Lawn Tennis Championships
- Punjab State Championships
- Rajasthan Championships
- Uttar Pradesh Championships
