= Western India Championships =

Defunct tennis tournament
- Founded: 1888; 138 years ago
- Abolished: 1980; 46 years ago
- Location: Bombay, Maharashtra, India
- Venue: Bombay Gymkhana Club
- Surface: Grass/Clay

The Western India Championships also known as the Western India Tennis Championships, was a combined men's and women's tennis tournament founded in 1888 as the Bombay Gymkhana Club Open Tournament. The championships were played at the Gymkhana Club grounds, in Bombay, Maharashtra, India. The championships ran until 1980 before they were discontinued.

== History ==
Tennis was introduced to India in the 1880s by British Army and Civilian Officers. In 1888 the Western India Championships were founded as the Bombay Gymkhana Club Tournament and played at the Bombay Gymkhana Club, Bombay, Maharashtra, India. In 1900 the tournament became known as the Western India Tournament, and in 1912 it was officially named the West India Championships. The championships were staged until 1980 when they were abolished.

In 1947, 1955 and 1959 this tournament was held in conjunction with the All India Hard Court Championships. It was also held jointly with the Cricket Club of India tournament for 1970 and 1975.

== Finals ==
=== Men's singles ===
(incomplete roll).

Year	Champions	Runners-up	Score
Bombay Gymkhana Club Tournament
1888	(United Kingdom of Great Britain and Ireland) Francis Reid Ward	(United Kingdom of Great Britain and Ireland) T.C. Sangster	2–6, 6–5, 6–3
1889	(United Kingdom of Great Britain and Ireland) Alfred Bruce Sangster	(India) Arthur Knapp Oliver	6–1, 5–6, 6–4
1890	(United Kingdom of Great Britain and Ireland) Eustace Ferrers Nicholson	(United Kingdom of Great Britain and Ireland) Arthur Elliott Barton	6–5, 6–5, 6–4
1891	(United Kingdom of Great Britain and Ireland) Eustace Ferrers Nicholson (2)	(United Kingdom of Great Britain and Ireland) Arthur Elliott Barton	6–4, 3–5, 6–2, 6–1
1892	(United Kingdom of Great Britain and Ireland) C.S. Smith	(United Kingdom of Great Britain and Ireland) Pelham George von Donop	8–6, 6–4, 6–1
1894	(United Kingdom of Great Britain and Ireland) C.S. Smith (2)	(United Kingdom of Great Britain and Ireland) Robert Montagu Poore	6–3, 6–2, 6–1
1897	(United Kingdom of Great Britain and Ireland) Herbert E. Cheetham	(United Kingdom of Great Britain and Ireland) John Glennie Greig	6-5, 6-2
1898	(United Kingdom of Great Britain and Ireland) John Glennie Greig	(United Kingdom of Great Britain and Ireland) Herbert E. Cheetham	6-5, 6-3
1899	(United Kingdom of Great Britain and Ireland) Arthur Cyril Ransome	(United Kingdom of Great Britain and Ireland) Percy F. Fisher	4–6, 6–3, 6–3, 6–1
Western India Tournament
1900	(United Kingdom of Great Britain and Ireland) Percy F. Fisher	(United Kingdom of Great Britain and Ireland) W. Reid	6–4, 3–6, 6–4
1902	(United Kingdom of Great Britain and Ireland) Francis J. Marshall	(United Kingdom of Great Britain and Ireland) W. Reid	6–5, 6–4, 6–3
1903	(United Kingdom of Great Britain and Ireland) W. Reid	(United Kingdom of Great Britain and Ireland) Herbert E. Cheetham	6–1, 6–3, 6–0
1904	(United Kingdom of Great Britain and Ireland) W. Reid (2)	(United Kingdom of Great Britain and Ireland) Ralph Kidd	6–0, 3–6, 6–3
1905	(United Kingdom of Great Britain and Ireland) Herbert E. Cheetham (2)	(United Kingdom of Great Britain and Ireland) Ralph Kidd	?
1906	(United Kingdom of Great Britain and Ireland) John C. S. Rendall	(United Kingdom of Great Britain and Ireland) Herbert E. Cheetham	6-3, 6-1
1907	(United Kingdom of Great Britain and Ireland) W. Reid (3)	(England) T.C. Lucas	6-4, 6-3
1909	(United Kingdom of Great Britain and Ireland) J. Stuart Milne	(United Kingdom of Great Britain and Ireland) A.H. Glendenning	6-5, 6-3
1910	(France) Richard Dubourdieu	(United Kingdom of Great Britain and Ireland) W. Reid	?
1911	(United Kingdom of Great Britain and Ireland) F.R.R. Brooke	(United Kingdom of Great Britain and Ireland) J. Stuart Milne	6-3, 6-3
Western India Championships
1912	(India) Hassan Ali Fyzee	(India) J.T. Lucas	7-5, 6-4
1913	(France) Richard Dubourdieu (2)	(India) Udupi D. Ranga Rao	6–4, 3–6, 6–2, 6–1
1914	(India) Hassan Ali Fyzee	(India) Udupi D. Ranga Rao	6–4, 2–6, 6–2, 6–3
1915	(India) Udupi D. Ranga Rao	(India) N.F. Naoroji	6-3, 6-2
1916	(India) Udupi D. Ranga Rao (2)	(Japan) Zenzo Shimidzu	0–6, 6–0, 6–1
1917	(India) Udupi D. Ranga Rao (3)	(India) Hassan Ali Fyzee	6-3, 6-0
1918	(Japan) Zenzo Shimidzu	(India) Udupi D. Ranga Rao	6-4, 6-1
1919	(United Kingdom of Great Britain and Ireland) John C. S. Rendall	(Japan) Zenzo Shimidzu	10–8, 4–6, 6–2, 9–7
1920	(India) Udupi D. Ranga Rao (4)	(India) Lewis Seymour Deane	6-4, 6-2
1921	(India) N.B. Bhagwat	(Japan) Tawara Tsumoru (Tsumio) Takeshi	6–4, 2–6, 6–1
1922	(India) Udupi D. Ranga Rao (5)	(United Kingdom of Great Britain and Ireland) Ernest Taylor Annett	6-3, 6-2
1923	(Japan) Sunao Okamoto	(India) Udupi D. Ranga Rao	6-1, 6-1
1924	(India) Mr. Chunilal	(United Kingdom) R.A. Wagle	6-0, 6-2
1925	(Japan) Sunao Okamoto (2)	(United Kingdom) Thomas William Brough	6-0, 6-3
1926	(India) Syed Mohammad Hadi	(India) Udupi D. Ranga Rao	2-6, 7-5 6-1
1927	(India) Alexander Maurice Dudley Pitt	(India) R.S. Raya Iyer	8–6, 5–7, 6–1
1928	(India) Alexander Maurice Dudley Pitt (2)	(United Kingdom) Morley Fox	6-4, 6-2
1929	(India) Alexander Maurice Dudley Pitt (3)	(United Kingdom) Morley Fox	6-4, 6-2
1930	(New Zealand) Buster Andrews	(India) M. Kamruddin	6-4, 6-3
1931	(India) N.R. Suvarna	(India) B.H. Khardekar	6–2, 3–6, 6–3
1932	(Japan) Jiro Satoh	(India) Edward Vivian Bobb	3–6, 6–3, 6–3
1933	(Italy) Giorgio de Stefani	(India) Edward Vivian Bobb	6-4, 6-3
1934	(India) Edward Vivian Bobb	(United Kingdom) John Edward Tew	7-5, 7-5
1935	(Kingdom of Yugoslavia) Josip Palada	(Kingdom of Yugoslavia) Franjo Punčec	6–4, 3–6, 6–3, 6–2
1936	(France) Roderich Menzel	(Czechoslovakia) Ladislav Hecht	6-1, 6-1
1937	(France) Antoine Gentien	(New Zealand) Alan Stedman	7-5, 6-2
1938	(India) Subba L.R. Sawhney	(India) Bernard Thomas Blake	6–4, 2–6, 6–4
1939	(India) Edward Vivian Bobb (2)	(India) Syed Abdul Azim	3–6, 6–1, 6–3
1940	(India) Edward Vivian Bobb (3)	(India) Syed Abdul Azim	2–6, 6–1, 6–2
1941	(Denmark) Finn Bekkevold	(India) Charles William Barker	7-5, 6-2
1942	(India) Ghaus Mohammed Khan	(India) Prem Lal Pandhi	6-2, 7-5
1943	(India) S.S. Indulkar	(India) R.N. Pandit	6–3, 2–6, 6–2
1944/1945	Not held (due to World War II)		
1946	(India) Narendra Nath	(India) / (United States) Jimmy Mehta	6-3, 6-3
Western India & All India Hard Court Championships
1947	(India) Narendra Nath (2)	(India) Khan-Iftikhar Ahmed	6-4 6-4 6-3
Western India Championships
1948	(Sweden) Torsten Johansson	(Sweden) Lennart Bergelin	6-4 ret.
1950	(France) Robert Abdesselam	(Belgium) Philippe Washer	6–2, 9–7, 6–2
1952	(United States) Louis Straight Clark	(Poland) Władysław Skonecki	8–6, 6–3, 3–6, 2–6, 6–2
1953	(India) Narendra Nath (3)	(India) Ramanathan Krishnan	6–4, 7–5, 6–0
1954	(Australia) Jack Arkinstall	(India) Sumant Misra	6–4, 1–6, 6–4
Western India & All India Hard Court Championships
1955	(India) Ramanathan Krishnan	(Australia) Jack Arkinstall	6–2, 0–6, 3–6, 6–1, 6–3
Western India Championships
1956	(India) Ramanathan Krishnan (2)	(Australia) Jack Arkinstall	5–7, 7–5, 6–0 ret.
1957	(Egypt) Jaroslav Drobný	(Australia) Jack Arkinstall	6–4, 6–3, 6–3
1958	(India) Ramanathan Krishnan (3)	(United Kingdom) Billy Knight	6–1, 6–2, 6–4
Western India & All India Hard Court Championships
1959	(India) Ramanathan Krishnan (4)	(Italy) Giuseppe Merlo	6–4, 6–3, 6–4
Western India Championships
1960	(India) Ramanathan Krishnan (5)	(Australia) Warren Woodcock	6–2, 6–3, 6–3
1962	(India) Ramanathan Krishnan (6)	(United Kingdom) Billy Knight	8–6, 6–3, 6–1
1965	(India) Shyam Minotra	(India) Ravi Venkatesan	13–11, 9–7, 6-2
1966	(India) Premjit Lall	(Japan) Osamu Ishiguro	3–6, 6–4, 6–3, 8–6
1967	(India) Jaidip Mukerjea	(Australia) Bob Carmichael	5–7, 4–6, 6–2, 6–3 6-3
1968	(India) Shiv Prakash Misra	(India) Premjit Lall	1–6, 8–6, 9–7, 4–6, 6–3
↓ Open Era ↓
1969	(India) Shyam Minotra	(Poland) Mieczysław Rybarczyk	6-1, 7-5

=== Women's singles ===
(incomplete roll)

Year	Champions	Runners-up	Score
Western India Championships
1924	(India) Lena McKenna	(India) Mrs T.E. Cunningham	6–8, 6–3, 6–3
1925	(United Kingdom) Gladys Tedman Bayley	(India) Meherbai Bhabha Tata	6–1, 1–6, 6–1
1926	(United Kingdom) Phyllis Howkins Covell	(United Kingdom) Annie Nepean Clayton	6-0, 6-0
1927	(United Kingdom) Phyllis Howkins Covell (2)	(India) R. Wallis	6-4, 6-3
1928	(United Kingdom) Phyllis Howkins Covell (3)	(India) G. Evans	6-4, 6-1
1929	(India) Mrs M.P. McDougall	(Australia) Olive Stebbing	7-5, 6-1
1930	(United Kingdom) Phyllis Howkins Covell (4)	(India) Leila Row	6-2, 6-1
1931	(India) Leila Row	(India) Laura Woodbridge	6-0, 6-1
1932	(India) Laura Woodbridge	(India) Esther Bonjour	6-4, 6-4
1933	(Italy) Lucia Valerio	(India) Leila Row	6-4, 6-3
1934	(India) Leila Row (2)	(India) Esther Bonjour	6-2, 6-1
1935	(India) Jenny Sandison	(India) Leila Row	3–6, 6–2, 6–4
1936	(India) Jenny Sandison Boland (2)	(India) Hyacinth Harvey-Johnston	6-3, 6-3
1937	(India) Leila Row (3)	(India) Meher Dubash	6-1, 6-2
1938	(India) Lolita Simon Foottit	(India) Mrs E.H. Edney	6–3, 3–6, 6–4
1939	(India) I.S. Hannay Williams	(India) S. Emery	6-4, 6-0
1940	(India) Leila Row (4)	(India) Khanum Haji	6-2, 6-2
1941	(India) Leila Row (5)	(India) Khanum Haji	6-3, 6-3
1942	(India) Khanum Haji	(India) Leila Row	6–8, 6–2, 9–7
1943	(India) Leila Row (6)	(India) Laura Woodbridge	6-3, 6-4
1946	(India) Leela Row Dayal (7)	(India) Laura Woodbridge	6-2, 6-0
Western India & All India Hard Court Championships
1947	(India) Leela Row Dayal (8)	(India) Khanum Haji Singh	5–7, 6–2, 6–3
Western India Championships
1948	(Not held)		
1949	(India) Khanum Haji Singh (2)	(India) Laura Woodbridge	6-4, 6-4
1950	(United Kingdom) Gem Hoahing	(India) Leela Row Dayal	6-0, 6-1
1952	(United States) Shirley Fry	(United States) Doris Hart	2–6, 6–4, 6–2
1953	(India) Leela Row Dayal (9)	(India) Laura Woodbridge	6–3, 7–9, 6–3
1954	(India) Urmila Thapar	(India) Laura Woodbridge	6–4, 4–6, 6–2
Western India & All India Hard Court Championships
1955	(India) Rita Davar	(Denmark) Bridget Zachariassen	6-3, 6-1
Western India Championships
1956	(West Germany) Totta Zehden	(West Germany) Inge Reh Vogle	6–3, 2–6, 6–4
Western India & All India Hard Court Championships
1957	(India) Khanum Haji Singh (3)	(India) Mrs Sarah Mody	6-2, 6-3
Western India Championships
1958	(Denmark) Bridget Zachariassen	(India) Laura Woodbridge	6–4, 2–6, 8–6
1959	(India) Mrs Sarah Mody	(India) Leela Punjabi	2–6, 9–7, 10-8
1960	(United States) Mimi Arnold	(Australia) Margaret Hellyer	6–8, 6–3, 6–2
1961	(Australia) Margaret Hellyer	(India) Dechu Appaiah	6-3, 6-4
1962	(Denmark) Pia Balling	(India) Dechu Appaiah	6-1, 6-0
1965	(India) Lakshmi Mahedevan	(India) Leela Punjabi	6-2, 10-8
1966	(United States) Carol-Ann Prosen	(India) Nirupama Vasant	6–3, 3–6, 6–4
1968	(India) Nirupama Vasant	(India) Rattan Thadani	6-2, 6-4
↓ Open Era ↓
1969	(India) Nirupama Vasant (2)	(Romania) Judith Dibar	8-6, 6-3
Western India Championships & Cricket Club of India Tournament
1970 (Feb)	(India) Nirupama Vasant (3)	(Socialist Federal Republic of Yugoslavia) Irena Škulj	3–6, 6–0, 6–3
1970 (Dec)	(India) Nirupama Vasant (4)	(India) Kiran Peshawaria	6-2, 6-3
Western India Championships
1971	(Not held)		
1972	(India) Nirupama Vasant Mankad (5)	(Australia) Marilyn Tesch	6-4, 6-1
1973	(India) Udaya Kumar	(India) Susan Das	6-2, 6-4
1974	(India) Susan Das	(India) Nirupama Vasant Mankad	6-2, 6-4
1975	(India) Nirupama Vasant Mankad (6)	(India) Udaya Kumar	6-1, 6-1
1976	(India) Nirupama Vasant Mankad (7)	(India) Lakshmi Mahedevan	6-1, 6-0
Western India Championships & Cricket Club of India Tournament
1977	(India) Nirupama Vasant Mankad (8)	(India) Amreeta Ahluwalia	6–4, 6–0
Western India Championships
1978	(India) Amreeta Ahluwalia	(India) Nirupama Vasant Mankad	5–7, 6–4, 8–6
1979	(India) Nirupama Vasant Mankad (9)	(India) Amreeta Ahluwalia	6-3, 6-2
1980	(India) Nandini Rangaraja	(India) Namratha Apparao	7-5, 6-0

== Event names ==
- Bombay Gymkhana Club Tournament (1888–1899)
- Western India Tournament (1900–1911)
- Western India Championships (1912–1980)
