= Khawaja Iftikhar =

Pakistani tennis player

- Khawaja Iftikhar Ahmed while playing tennis
- Full name: Khawaja Iftikhar Ahmed
- ITF name: Khawaja Iftikhar Ahmed
- Country (sports): British India (1940–1946); Pakistan (1947–1956)
- Born: British India
- Died: Pakistan
- Turned pro: 1932 (amateur)
- Retired: 1962
- Plays: Right-handed

Khawaja Iftikhar Ahmed was a Pakistani tennis player who played for British India before independence and for Pakistan after independence. He was one of the highest ranked players in India from 1940 to 1946, and later retained the position in Pakistan from 1947 to 1956 after the split of Indian subcontinent. He retired from the professional sports in 1962.

The recipient of Tamgha-e-Imtiaz, a state-organised honour of Pakistan and the Pride of Performance in 1960, he was one of the prominent players in the Indian subcontinent, collectively from 1940 to 1960.

== Tennis career ==
He was born and raised in British India. In 1920 when he was ten years old, he along with his father used to play on a local playground in Chakwal area of Islamabad, and later appeared in tennis when he was a student of 9th grade.

He was active on the ILTF World Circuit from as early 1932 when he competed at the Angmering-on-Sea Open. He competed at tournaments in Ceylon, England, India, Netherlands and Turkey during his career in which he won fourteen singles titles including the Northern India Championships in 1939, Derbyshire Championships and Essex Championships both in 1947.

He won the Pakistan National Championships eight times between 1947 and 1955. In addition he won the Ceylon Championships twice in 1949 and 1951.

He was also runner-up at the All India Championships three times between 1943 and 1952, the Punjab Championships twice in 1939 and 1952, the Pakistan International Championships in 1949 and 1951, the Indian International Championships in 1952 and the New Malden Open in 1954.
