= Pakistan International Championships =

Defunct tennis tournament
- Tour: ILTF Circuit (1949-1966)
- Founded: 1949; 77 years ago
- Abolished: 1966; 60 years ago
- Location: Karachi; Lahore; Lyallpur
- Venue: Various

Current champions
- Men's singles: (Soviet Union) Vyacheslav Egorov

The Pakistan International Championships was a tennis tournament in the pre-open era.

The event began after Pakistan became a country in the late 1940s and continued until the late 1960s. Champions included Pedro Masip, Jack Arkinstall, Torben Ulrich and Ramanathan Krishnan.

== Finals ==
=== Men's singles ===
Year	Champion	Runner-up	Score
1949	(Spain) Pedro Masip	(Pakistan) Khawaja Iftikhar	2-6, 6–3, 5–7, 6–2, 7–5
1951	(Poland) Władysław Skonecki	(Pakistan) Khawaja Iftikhar	6-1, 6–8, 6–2
1953	(Austria) Alfred Huber	(Brazil) Armando Vieira	6-3, 6–3
1954	(India) Islam Ahmed	(Pakistan) Mohammed Arif Ilahi	6-1, 6-2 6–3
1956	(Australia) Jack Arkinstall	(Poland) Jan Radzio	6-1, 6–2, 6–1
1958	(Denmark) Torben Ulrich	(France) Robert Haillet	6-4, 1–6, 6–4
1961	(India) Ramanathan Krishnan	(Australia) Warren Jacques	4-6, 6–2, 6–4
1966	(Soviet Union) Vyacheslav Egorov	(Soviet Union) Teimuraz Kakulia	6-4, 6–4, 6–4

== See also ==
- Category:National and multi-national tennis tournaments
