= Nirupama Mankad =

Indian tennis player

- Country (sports): India
- Born: 17 January 1947 (age 79) Karachi, Sindh, British India
- Turned pro: 1964 (amateur)
- Retired: 1979

Singles
- Career titles: 18 ILTF/ITF

Doubles
- Career titles: 11 ITF

Grand Slam mixed doubles results
- Wimbledon: 2R (1971)

Nirupama Mankad (née Vasant; born 17 January 1947) is a former Indian tennis player. She is the first Indian woman in the modern era to play at a main draw of a Grand Slam. She was active from 1964 to 1979 and contested 25 finals and won 18 singles titles.She was one of the torch runners in the most famous spirit of freedom video that played on Indian television in the 1980’s.

== Career ==
Nirupama Mankad is the daughter of G. Vasant, a leading tennis player in India in his time. She survives her husband, the late Ashok Mankad, a former Indian Test cricketer. Their son Harsh Mankad is an Indian Davis Cup player.

Mankad won the Asian women's tennis championship in 1965 at the age of 17. She played Wimbledon junior event in 1965 and partnered Anand Amritraj in the mixed doubles event in 1971, reaching the second round. She took part in tournaments on ILTF European Circuit when she played in Europe such as reaching the semi finals at the Ilkley Open in 1970 where she lost to Corinne Molesworth who went on to win that event. She was India's top ranked tennis player between 1965 and 1978, winning the national championship seven times during this time. She won the Indian government's Arjuna award in 1980.

Her best ranking was No 1, and was also a two-time Asian champion and a Fed Cup player.

== ILTF Career finals ==
=== Singles:25 (18 titles, 7 runners-up) ===
Outcome	No.	Date	Tournament	Location	Surface	Opponent	Score
Winner	1.	January 1965	Asian Lawn Tennis Championships	Calcutta, India	Hard	(India) Lakshmi Mahadevan	6–2, 6–4
Runner-up	1.	January 1965	National Lawn Tennis Championships of India	New Delhi, India	Hard	(New Zealand) Marion Law	2–6, 4–6
Runner-up	2.	January 1966	Central India Championships	Allahabad, India	Grass	(Soviet Union) Tiiu Kivi	9–11, 2–6
Runner-up	3.	January 1966	Western India Championships	Bombay, India	Hard	(United States) Carol-Ann Prosen	3–6, 6–3, 4–6
Runner-up	4.	January 1968	?	Bombay, India	Clay	(Soviet Union) Aleksandra Ivanova	3–6, 6–2, 4–6
Winner	2.	March 1968	Western India Championships (2)	Bombay, India	Hard	(India) Rattan Thadani	6–2, 6–4
Winner	3.	December 1968	Asian Lawn Tennis Championships (2)	Calcutta, India	Hard	(United States) Alice Tym	6–1, 3–6, 6–3
Winner	4.	February 1969	Western India Championships (3)	Bombay, India	Hard	(Romania) Judith Dibar	8–6, 6–3
Winner	5.	December 1969	Indian International Championships	New Delhi, India	Hard	(United States) Alice Tym	6–1, 3–6, 6–3
Winner	6.	February 1970	Western India Championships (4)	Bombay, India	Hard	(Socialist Federal Republic of Yugoslavia) Irena Škulj	3–6, 6–0, 6–3
Winner	7.	December 1970	Cricket Club of India Tournament	Bombay, India	Hard	(India) Kiran Peshawaria	6–2, 6–3
Runner-up	5.	January 1971	Andhra Pradesh State Championships	Amaravati, India	Hard	(Soviet Union) Tiiu Kivi	2–6, 5-7
Winner	8.	January 1971	National Lawn Tennis Championships of India	New Delhi, India	?	(India) Kiran Peshawaria	4–6, 6–1, 6–1
Winner	9.	March 1971	Kenyan International Championships	Nairobi, Kenya	Clay	(South Africa) Jenny Paterson	6–0, 6–0
Winner	10.	February 1972	Western India Championships (5)	Poona, India	Hard	(Australia) Marilyn Tesch	4–6, 2–6
Runner-up	6.	February 1974	Western India Championships	Madras, India	Hard	(India) Susan Das	4–6, 2–6
Winner	11.	January 1975	National Lawn Tennis Championships of India (2)	New Delhi, India	Hard	(India) Susan Das	7–5, 6–4
Winner	12.	February 1975	Western India Championships (6)	Bombay, India	Hard	(India) Udaya Kumar	6–1, 6–1
Winner	13.	January 1976	National Lawn Tennis Championships of India (3)	New Delhi, India	Hard	(India) Susan Das	6–4, 6–3
Winner	14.	February 1976	Western India Championships (7)	Bombay, India	Hard	(India) Lakshmi Mahedevan	6–1, 6–0
Winner	15.	February 1977	National Lawn Tennis Championships of India (4)	Bombay, India	Hard	(India) Susan Das	6–4, 6–3
Winner	16.	February 1977	Western India Championships (8)	Bombay, India	Hard	(India) Amreeta Ahluwalia	6–4, 6–0
Runner-up	7.	January 1978	Southern India Championships	Madras, India	Hard	(India) Amreeta Ahluwalia	5–7, 6–4, 8–6
Winner	17.	February 1978	National Lawn Tennis Championships of India (5)	Calcutta, India	Hard	(India) Amreeta Ahluwalia	3–6, 6–1, 8–6
Winner	18.	January 1979	Western India Championships (9)	Bombay, India	Hard	(India) Amreeta Ahluwalia	6–3, 6–2

=== Doubles:19 (11 titles, 8 runners-up) ===
Outcome	No.	Date	Tournament	Surface	Partner	Opponents	Score
Runner-up	1.	March 1964	Jaipur, India	Hard	(India) Lakshmi Mahadevan	(United Kingdom) Begum Khan (United Kingdom) Jill Rook	0–6, 1-6
Runner-up	2.	January 1965	Kolkata, India	Hard	(India) Leela Panjabi	(India) Begum Khan (India) Rita Suriya	2–6, 4-6
Runner-up	3.	January 1965	New Delhi, India	Hard	(India) Leela Panjabi	(New Zealand) Marion Law (Australia) Madonna Schacht	6–2, 3–6, 3-6
Winner	4.	January 1966	Thiruvananthapuram, India	Hard	(United States) Carol-Ann Prosen	(United Kingdom) Rita Bentley (United Kingdom) Elizabeth Starkie	6–2, 6–4
Winner	5.	January 1966	Mumbai, India	Hard	(India) Begum Khan	(United States) Carol-Ann Prosen (United Kingdom) Sue Tutt	6–2, 1–6, 6–4
Winner	6.	February 1966	Hyderabad, India	Hard	(United Kingdom) Sue Tutt	(India) Begum Khan (United States) Carol-Ann Prosen	6–1, 6–4
Winner	7.	February 1966	Chennai, India	Hard	(India) Dechu Appaiah	(India) Begum Khan (India) Leela Panjabi	6–2, 6–3
Winner	8.	February 1966	Lucknow, India	Hard	(India) Dechu Appaiah	(United Kingdom) Rita Bentley (United Kingdom) Anthea Rigby	9–11, 6–4, 6–2
Runner-up	9.	January 1967	Calcutta, India	Hard	(India) Rita Suriya	(Soviet Union) Rena Abzhandadze (Soviet Union) Aleksandra Ivanova	0–6, 5–7
Runner-up	10.	January 1968	Bangalore, India	Hard	(India) Jeroo Vakil	(Soviet Union) Aleksandra Ivanova (Soviet Union) Nina Turkheli	0–6, 1–6
Runner-up	11.	January 1968	Bombay, India	Hard	(India) Rattan Thadani	(Soviet Union) Aleksandra Ivanova (Soviet Union) Nina Turkheli	2–6, 3–6
Winner	12.	January 1969	Visakhapatnam, India	Hard	(India) Rita Suriya	(United States) Alice Tym (India) Kiran Peshawaria	6–2, 6–1
Runner-up	13.	January 1970	Amritsar, India	Hard	(India) Indu Sood	(Soviet Union) Aleksandra Ivanova (Socialist Federal Republic of Yugoslavia) Irena Škulj	2–6, 1–6
Winner	14.	February 1971	Kolkata, India	Hard	(India) Kiran Peshawaria	(India) Udaya Kumar (India) Susan Das	6–1, 6–3
Winner	15.	March 1971	Nairobi, Kenya	Clay	(South Africa) Jenny Paterson	(South Africa) Marianna Brummer (South Africa) Greta Delport	6–2, 6–2
Winner	16.	September 1971	Kuala Lumpur, Malaysia	Hard	(New Zealand) Cecilie Fleming	(Thailand) Somsri Klumsombut (Thailand) Phanow Sudsawadsi	7–5, 6–4
Winner	17.	February 1974	Chennai, India	Hard	(India) Udaya Kumar	(India) Susan Das (India) Kiran Peshawaria	6–4, 6–4
Runner-up	18.	September 1974	Colombo, Sri Lanka	Hard	(India) Susan Das	(Indonesia) Lany Kaligis (Indonesia) Lita Liem Sugiarto	5–7, 6–1, 1-6
Winner	19.	February 1978	New Delhi, India	Hard	(India) Amreeta Ahluwalia	(Australia) Carol Draper (United States) Robin Harris	5–7, 6–2, 6–0
