= Mankad (surname) =

Mankad is a surname. Notable people with the surname include:

- Vinoo Mankad (1917–1978), Indian cricketer
- Ashok Mankad (1946–2008), Indian cricketer, son of Vinoo Mankad
- Nirupama Mankad (born 1947), Indian tennis player, wife of Ashok Mankad
- Harsh Mankad (born 1979), Indian tennis player, son of Ashok and Nirupama Mankad
