= Southern India Championships =

Defunct tennis tournament
- Tour: ILTF World Circuit
- Founded: 1889; 137 years ago
- Abolished: 1992; 34 years ago
- Location: Madras, Tamil Nadu, India
- Venue: Madras Gymkhana Club
- Surface: Grass

The Southern India Championships, also known as the South Indian International Championships, was a combined men's and women's tennis tournament held in Madras, Tamil Nadu, India. It was founded in 1889 as the South India Championships. The championships was played at the Madras Gymkhana Club grounds. The championships ran on the ILTF World Circuit until 1973,then the ITF Independent Circuit before it was downgraded it continued up to the early 1990s.

== History ==
Tennis was introduced to India in the 1880s by the British Army and civilian officers. As early as 1883, the first tennis courts laid in Madras were at the Madras Cricket Club (MCC). In 1884 Madras Gymkhana Club built its first tennis courts. In 1889 the South India Championship was founded and played at the Madras Gymkhana Club. During the 1930s to 1950s the tournament was known as the South Indian International Championships. The championships ran on the ITF World Circuit until 1980 before it was downgraded it continued up to the early 1990s.

== Finals ==
=== Men's singles ===
(incomplete roll)

Year	Champion	Runner-Up	Score
1887	(United Kingdom) Spencer Cox	(United Kingdom) H.C. King	6–5,
1888	(United Kingdom) Nesfield Grant Benson	(United Kingdom) A.B. Fortune	5–6, 6–3, 6–3
1889	(United Kingdom) Harry Grove	(India) Charles Higginbotham	6–2, 7–5
1890	(United Kingdom) Harry Grove (2)	(United Kingdom) Charles Lacy Sweet	10–12, 6–1, 6–1
1891	(India) Charles Higginbotham	(New Zealand) William Barton	6–1, 6–4
1893	(India) Charles Higginbotham (2)	(United Kingdom) Arthur Hall	6–2, 7–5
1894	(India) Charles Higginbotham (3)	(United Kingdom) Arthur Hall	6–2, 6–2
1895	(India) Charles Higginbotham (4)	(United Kingdom) J.E. Donnison	6–3, 7–5
1896	(India) Charles Higginbotham (5)	(United Kingdom) Ewan Percy Corlett	6–1, 3–6, 6–3
1897	(India) Charles Higginbotham (6)	(Ireland) Henry John Allen	6–4, 3–6, 6–2, 1–6, 6–2
1898	(Ireland) Henry John Allen	(India) Charles Higginbotham	6–4, 6–1
1909	(Ireland) John Frederick Graham	(France) Richard Dubourdieu	4–6, 3–6, 6–4, 6–2, 6–2
1911	(Ireland) John Frederick Graham (2)	(United Kingdom) T.C. Manders	6–1, 6–3, 6–2
1912	(Scotland) Captain G. Bacchus	(Scotland) Captain J.J. Robb	3–6, 4–6, 6–4, 6–3, 6–0
1919	(United Kingdom) Montagu Edward Nigel-Jones	(India) Naragav (Narayana) Murthy	6–4, 6–4, 6–2
1922	(India) P. Markendeyalu	(India) Sri-Krishna Prasada	6–3, 6–2, 2–6, 6–0
1924	(India) T.O. Singaravelu	(India) T.B. Balagopalan	6–4, 6–3, 6–2
1925	(India) Cotah Ramaswami	(United Kingdom) George H. Perkins	6-2, 6-3
1926	(United Kingdom) George H. Perkins	(India) T.B. Balagopalan	6–4, 0–6, 6–4, 2–6, 5–6, retd.
1927	(India) T.B. Balagopalan	(India) T.O. Singaravelu	6–4, 6–2, 6–1
1928	(India) T.B. Balagopalan (2)	(India) Sri-Krishna Prasada	2–6, 6–3, 6–1
1929	(India) T.B. Balagopalan (3)	(India) Sri-Krishna Prasada	6–2, 6–1, 4–6, 6–3
1930	(India) T.B. Balagopalan (4)	(United Kingdom) C.J. Mullen	Won ?
1931	(United Kingdom) Pat Hughes	(India) N. Krishnaswami	6–1, 6–1, 6–0
1932	(India) N. Krishnaswami	(India) T.B. Balagopalan	2–6, 6–3, 6–4, 7–5
1933	(Japan) Jiro Satoh	(Italy) Giorgio de Stefani	5–7, 7–5, 4–6, 7–5, 6–3
1934	(India) N. Krishnaswami (2)	(India) U. Mahadevan	6–2, 6–2, 6–1
1935	(Socialist Federal Republic of Yugoslavia) Franjo Punčec	(Socialist Federal Republic of Yugoslavia) Josip Palada	6–4, 6–1, 8–6
1936	(Czechoslovakia) Roderich Menzel	(Germany) Georg Felix von Metaxa	6–4, 6–4, 6–2
1937	(New Zealand) Alan Stedman	(Czechoslovakia) Ladislav Hecht	6–4, 3–6, 6–4, 6–3
1938	(India) Tenkasi K. Ramanathan	(India) Balachandra Rao	6–3, 6–3, 6–1
1940	(Socialist Federal Republic of Yugoslavia) Franjo Punčec (2)	(India) Ghaus Mohammad	6–1, 6–2, 6–0
1942	(India) B.R. Kapanipathy	(Denmark) Finn Bekkevold	6–4, 6–4, 6–4
1945	(India) Ghaus Mohammad	(India) B.R. Kapanipathy	walkover
1946	(India) B.R. Kapanipathy (2)	(India) Irshad Hussain	5–7, 6–1, 1–6, 6–4, 6–3
1948	(Sweden) Lennart Bergelin	(Sweden) Torsten Johansson	5–7, 6–3, 6–4
1950	(India) B.R. Kapanipathy (3)	(India) Pundi Srinivas Seshadri	1–6, 4–6, 6–2, 6–4, 7–5
1951	(United States) Fred Kovaleski	(United States) Irvin Dorfman	6–4, 7–9, 2–6, 7–5, 6–3
1953	(United Kingdom) Tony Mottram	(India) Ramanathan Krishnan	8–6, 8–6, 6–2
1954	(Australia) Jack Arkinstall	(India) Ramanathan Krishnan	6-4, 6-3, 4-6, 6-2
1955	(India) Ramanathan Krishnan	(Australia) Jack Arkinstall	6–2, 4–6, 6–1, 0–6, 6–3
1956	(Australia) Jack Arkinstall (2)	(United States) Bob Perry	6-4, 6-4, 6-4
1957	(Egypt) Jaroslav Drobný	(Australia) Jack Arkinstall	6–3, 6–2, 6–4
1958	(United Kingdom) Billy Knight	(United Kingdom) Tony Pickard	6–2, 6–3, 6–2
1966	(India) Ravi Venkatesan	(Greece) Nicky Kalogeropoulos	6–1, 6–2
1982	(India) Enrico Piperno	(India) Illiyas Hussain	1–6, 6–3, 6–4
1987	(India) Nandan Bal	(India) Karathozuvu G. Ramesh	6–3, 6–4

=== Women's singles ===
(incomplete roll)

Year	Champion	Runner-Up	Score
1889	(United Kingdom) Miss Nicholas	(United Kingdom) Edith Morgan	6–4, 6–3
1891	(United Kingdom) Mrs Fortune	(United Kingdom) Miss Bruce-Foote	6–4, 4–6, 6–0
1920	(India) Miss Dunbar	(India) Margaret Bennett	6–4, 2–6, 6–3
1921	(India) Mrs Gempertz	(India) Miss Dunbar	walkover
1922	(India) Mrs Kirkpatrick	(India) Mrs Gempertz	6–2, 6–2
1923	(India) Mrs Wrenick	(India) Mrs Kirkpatrick	6–3, 6–3
1924	(India) Mrs Kirkpatrick (2)	(India) Miss Anson	6–3 retd.
1925	(India) Mary Moberly	(India) Mrs Goodhind	7–5, 2–6, 8–6
1926	(India) Margaret Mangin Hasler	(India) Mrs Judd	6–2, 6–3
1927	(India) Mrs Mullen	(India) Mrs Pullen	6–3, 6–4
1928	(India) Mrs Mullen (2)	(India) Mrs G. Canning Pearce	6–4, 6–1
1929	(India) Mrs Mullen (3)	(India) Laura Woodbridge	6–3, 6–1
1930	(India) Mrs A.S. Butler	(India) Laura Woodbridge	6–4, 6–4
1931	(India) Laura Woodbridge	(India) Mrs G.L. Baker	7–5, 8–6
1932	(India) Laura Woodbridge (2)	(Australia) Olive Stebbing	6–4, 3–6, 8–6
1933	(India) Miss Breay	(India) E. Brown	7–5, 6–3
1934	(Australia) Olive Stebbing	(India) Valborg Sastri	6–1, 7–5
1935	(India) Valborg Sastri	(India) B. Downing	6–2, 6–1
1936	(India) Valborg Sastri (2)	(India) Mrs Taylor	6–4, 6–2
1947	(India) Sheila Roberts	(Dominion of Ceylon) Doreen Sansoni	6–2, 4–6, 6–4
1948	(India) Laura Woodbridge (3)	(India) Promilla Khanna	6–2, 6–1
1950	(United States) Gussie Moran	(Argentina) Mary Terán de Weiss	6–0, 3–6, 6–1
1951	(United States) Dorothy Head	(United Kingdom) Joy Mottram	6–0, 5–7, 6–3
1952	(Argentina) Mary Terán de Weiss	(United States) Pat Canning Todd	6–4, 3–6, 7–5
1953	(United Kingdom) Joy Mottram	(India) Rita Davar	6–0, 6–0
1954	(India) Rita Davar	(India) Urmila Thapar	6–3, 6–3
1955	(India) Rita Davar (2)	(India) Sarah Mody	6–1, 7–5
1956	(West Germany) Totta Zehden	(West Germany) Inge Reh Vogler	6–4, 6–4
1957	(India) Khanum Haji	(India) Sarah Mody	6–3, 6–2
1958	(India) Sarah Mody	(India) Laura Woodbridge	6–4, 9–11, 6–2
1959	(India) Laura Woodbridge (4)	(India) Dechu Appaiah	6–4, 5–2 retd.
1960	(United States) Mimi Arnold	(Australia) Margaret Hellyer	3–6, 6–2, 6–0
1966	(United States) Carol Ann Prosen	(India) Babbili Kumararani	6–4, 6–4
1967	(Soviet Union) Rena Abzhandadze	(India) Nirupama Mankad	4–6, 6–3, 6–3
