= Asian Amateur Championships =

Asian Amateur Championships can refer to two things:

- Asian Amateur Boxing Championships
- Asian Amateur Championships - tennis tournament
- Asia-Pacific Amateur Championship - golf tournament
