= Jean Danilovich =

American tennis player

Jean Danilovich (born July 29, 1946, in Sacramento, California) is an American amateur tennis player.

In 1964, she was ranked in Class A nationally (meaning she was included among those ranked No. 21 to No. 24) and was No. 6 in the "18 & Under" rankings in the U.S. She won her first big title at the tennis tournament in Cincinnati and defeated Julie Heldman in the semifinals and Alice Tym in the final to win the title in Cincinnati. She also reached the doubles final in Cincinnati with Cathie Gagel.

In the same year, she reached the singles and doubles final in Indianapolis, and the doubles final at the U.S. Clay Court Championship in Chicago.
