= Parveen Ahmed =

Pakistani tennis player

- Full name: Parveen Ahmed Sheikh
- Country (sports): Pakistan
- Plays: Right Handed

Singles
- Career titles: 4

Grand Slam singles results
- Wimbledon: 2R (1963)

Parveen Ahmed (born 1930s) is a former Pakistani tennis player.

== Career ==
She played in Singles at the Wimbledon in 1963. She lost to the Brazilian Maria Bueno in the Second Round. She is the first Pakistani female tennis player to compete in the Grand Slam.

== Career finals ==
=== Singles (4–2) ===
Result	No.	Year	Location	Surface	Opponent	Score
Win	1.	October 1954	Lyallpur, Pakistan	Clay	(India) Rushna Dinshaw	6–4, 2–6, 6–3
Win	2.	January 1955	Northern India Championships, New Delhi, India	Hard	(India) Urmila Thapar	6–4, 5–7, 6–1
Win	3.	February 1958	Bombay, India	Hard	(India) Anisa Desai	6–1, 6–2
Loss	1.	December 1958	Lahore, Pakistan	Hard	(United States) Louise Snow	3–6, 4–6
Win	4.	April 1961	Lahore, Pakistan	Hard	(Pakistan) Salma Noorani	6–3, 6–3
Loss	2.	August 1963	Worthing, United Kingdom	Grass	(United Kingdom) Honor Durose	3–6, 3–6

=== Doubles (10–8) ===
Result	No.	Year	location	Surface	Partner	Opponents	Score
Loss	1.	January 1953	Calcutta, India	Hard	(United Kingdom) Joy Mottram	(India) Rita Davar (India) Laura Woodbridge	1–6, 2–6
Win	1.	January 1953	Lahore, Pakistan	Hard	(United Kingdom) Joy Mottram	(Pakistan) Taqi Butt (Japan) Sachiko Kamo	6–2, 10–8
Win	2.	February 1953	Dacca, Bangladesh	Hard	(United Kingdom) Joy Mottram	(Pakistan) Taqi Butt (Japan) Sachiko Kamo	6–2, 2–6, 11–9
Loss	2.	January 1954	New Delhi, India	Hard	(India) Laura Woodbridge	(India) Rita Davar (India) Urmila Thapar	7–5, 1–6, 3–6
Loss	3.	May 1954	Dorset, United Kingdom	Grass	(United Kingdom) Elaine Watson	(New Zealand) Judy Burke (United Kingdom) Betty Uber	0–6, 7–5, 4–6
Win	3.	October 1954	Lyallpur, Pakistan	Clay	(Pakistan) Tahira Hamid	(India) Rushna Dinshaw (India) Urmila Thapar	6–4, 6–2
Win	4.	January 1955	Northern India Championships, New Delhi, India	Hard	(Pakistan) Taqi Butt	(India) Sarah Mody (India) Laura Woodbridge	8–6, 6–3
Loss	4.	December 1955	New Delhi, India	Hard	(Pakistan) Taqi Butt	(Japan) Sachiko Kamo (West Germany) Totte Zehden	1–6, 6–4, 2–6
Win	5.	January 1956	Allahabad, India	Hard	(Pakistan) Tahira Hamid	(West Germany) Inge Vogler (West Germany) Totte Zehden	6–4, 3–6, 6–2
Loss	5.	January 1956	Bombay, India	Hard	(Pakistan) Tahira Hamid	(West Germany) Inge Vogler (West Germany) Totte Zehden	3–6, 2–6
Win	6.	January 1956	Madras, India	Hard	(United Kingdom) Angela Buxton	(Japan) Sachiko Kamo (West Germany) Totte Zehden	4–6, 6–3, 6–4
Win	7.	January 1957	Bombay, India	Hard	(India) Sarah Mody	(India) Khanum Singh (India) Leila Punjabi	6–0, 6–3
Win	8.	January 1957	Delhi, India	Hard	(India) Sarah Mody	(India) Khanum Singh (India) Pramila Khanna Singh	4–6, 7–5, 6–1
Loss	6.	December 1958	Lahore, Pakistan	Hard	(Pakistan) Taqi Butt	(Pakistan) Tahira Hamid (United States) Louise Snow	3–6, 2–6
Win	9.	January 1959	Calcutta, India	Hard	(India) Dechu Appaiah	(India) Khanum Singh (India) Laura Woodbridge	6–4, 6–2
Win	10.	April 1961	Lahore, Pakistan	Hard	(Pakistan) Salma Noorani	(Pakistan) Laila Sheikh (Pakistan) Shahnaz Rahim	6–3, 6–4
Loss	7.	February 1962	New Delhi, India	Hard	(Denmark) Pia Balling	(Australia) Lesley Turner (Australia) Madonna Schacht	1–6, 3–6
Loss	8.	February 1963	Calcutta, India	Hard	(India) Rita Suriya	(India) Cherri Chettyanna (India) Rattan Thadani	1–6, 6–1, 3–6
