= Alfred Sangster =

English cricketer, tennis player and soldier

Personal information
- Full name: Alfred Bruce Sangster
- Born: 22 October 1864; Notting Hill, Middlesex, England
- Died: 18 August 1913 (aged 48); Karachi, Bombay Presidency, British India
- Batting: Unknown
- Bowling: Unknown

Domestic team information
- Years: Team
- 1897/98: Europeans

Career statistics
Competition	First-class
Matches	2
Runs scored	23
Batting average	5.75
100s/50s	–/–
Top score	12
Balls bowled	10
Wickets	0
Bowling average	–
5 wickets in innings	–
10 wickets in match	–
Best bowling	–
Catches/stumpings	2/–
- Source: ESPNcricinfo, 2 November 2023

Alfred Bruce Sangster (22 October 1864 — 18 August 1913) was an English first-class cricketer, tennis player, and an officer in both the British Army and the British Indian Army.

The son of Alfred Henry Sangster, he was born at Notting Hill in October 1864. He was educated at Dover College until 1882, and Brighton College until 1883. Sangster was commissioned into the Buffs (East Kent Regiment) as a lieutenant in January 1885, before transferring to the King's Own Yorkshire Light Infantry in November 1886. In January 1888, he was seconded for service in British India as a lieutenant with the Bombay Staff Corps. In India, Sangster played both cricket and tennis. In tennis, he was singles and doubles champion in the Western India Championships. In cricket, he made two appearances in first-class cricket for the Europeans cricket team against the Parsees in the 1897–98 Bombay Presidency Matches. In these, he scored 23 runs with a highest score of 12. In November 1897, he was promoted to captain, with promotion to major following in November 1904; by his latter promotion, he was serving in the 104th Wellesley's Rifles. Sangster was promoted to lieutenant colonel in November 1912, ten months prior to his sudden death at Karachi on 18 August 1913.
