= Dilip Bose =

Indian tennis player

- Full name: Dilip Kumar Bose
- Country (sports): India
- Born: 28 May 1921 Patna, British India
- Died: 30 December 1996 (aged 74–75) Calcutta, West Bengal, India
- Plays: Right-handed

Grand Slam singles results
- Wimbledon: 4R (1948)

Grand Slam doubles results
- Wimbledon: 2R (1947)

Grand Slam mixed doubles results
- Wimbledon: 3R (1948)

Dilip Kumar Bose (28 May 1921 – 30 December 1996) was an Indian professional tennis player. He was a winner of the Asian Championships and a member of the India Davis Cup team. After retirement, he served as a coach and administrator. The All India Tennis Association instituted a lifetime achievement award in his name in 2002.

Bose won the single's event in the inaugural Asian Championships in 1949 at his club, the Calcutta South Club in Calcutta. As a result, he was seeded 15 at the Wimbledon in 1950. He conceded the second round match, upon retiring, to Hans van Swol of the Netherlands with the score 6–4, 5–4 in the latter's favour. He had only recovered from a heavy attack of malaria a few days prior and was advised by doctors against playing. In the same year, he won the double's event at the Berlin championships with Australia's Bill Sidwell.

== Career ==
Bose won the single's event in the inaugural edition of the First International Lawn Tennis Championships of Asia held in 1949 in Calcutta. India number one ranked player at the time, he defeated compatriot and India's number two ranked Sumant Misra 6–1, 6–2, 8–6 in the final on 1 January 1950.
