= Central India Championships =

Defunct tennis tournament
- Event name: Central India Lawn Tennis Championships
- Founded: 1912; 113 years ago
- Abolished: 1970; 55 years ago
- Location: Indore (1912–1939), Allahabad (1943–70)

The Central India Championships or formally the Central India Lawn Tennis Championships was a combined men's and women's tennis tournament founded in 1912. The championships were first played at Indore, Madhya Pradesh, India. The championships ran until 1970 before it was discontinued as part of the worldwide tennis circuit.

== History ==
Tennis was introduced to India in the 1880s by British Army and Civilian Officers. In 1912 the Central India Lawn Tennis Championships, were established. The championships were staged until 1970 when they were discontinued as part of the worldwide tennis circuit.

Former winners on the men's singles title included; Ghaus Mohammed Khan, Władysław Skonecki, Ulf Schmidt, Ramanathan Krishnan, Roy Emerson, Jaidip Mukerjea, Ion Țiriac and Petre Mărmureanu.

== Locations ==
The championships were staged at Indore, Madhya Pradesh, India from 1912 to 1942. They were staged at Allahabad, Uttar Pradesh, India from 1943 to 1970.
