= Leela Row Dayal =

Indian tennis player

- Full name: Leela Reghavendra Row
- Country (sports): British India; India (post 1947)
- Born: 19 December 1911 Bombay, India
- Height: 4 ft 10 in (1.47 m)
- Plays: Right-handed

Singles

Grand Slam singles results
- French Open: 2R (1935)
- Wimbledon: 2R (1934)

Doubles

Grand Slam doubles results
- French Open: 1R (1931, 1932)

Grand Slam mixed doubles results
- French Open: 1R (1932)

Leela Row Dayal (19 December 1911 – 19 May 1964) was a female tennis player and author from India. She was the first female Indian tennis player to win a match at the Wimbledon Championships. She wrote several books on Indian classical dance in both English and Sanskrit.

== Career ==
=== Tennis ===
At the 1934 Wimbledon Championships she became the first Indian female player to win a match, defeating Gladys Southwell in the first round of the singles event. In the second round she was defeated by Ida Adamoff in three sets. The next year, 1935, she returned but lost in the first round in straight sets to Evelyn Dearman.

She entered the singles competition of the French Championships five times (1931–32, 1934–36) but did not manage to win a match. Her second round result in 1935 was due to a bye in the first round.

Row won seven singles titles at the All India Championships (1931, 1936–38, 1940–41, 1943) and was runner-up on three occasions (1932–33, 1942). In 1931 she won the singles title at the West of India Championships and she was a finalist there in 1933. In 1935 during a tour of England she won the Hampshire Lawn Tennis Championships at Bournemouth against Joan Ingram, and the Hastings and St. Leonard's Open against Peggy Brazier.. In 1937 she won the Northern India Championships against Meher Dubash in Lahore.

The straight backhand drive was her favorite shot.

=== Author ===
Row was the author of several books on ancient and modern classical Indian dance. These books were bilingual, written in English and Sanskrit. In 1958 she published "Natya Chandrika", a handwritten bilingual treatise on the Indian classical dance form Natya. She also helped to translate many poems made by her mother and converted them into Sankskrit plays.

== Personal life ==
Row was the daughter of Raghavendra Row, a physician, and Pandita Kshama Row, a Sanskrit poet. Her mother was also an early player of tennis in India, winning the singles title at the Bombay Presidency Hard Court Championships in 1927. She was educated in India, England and France. In the 1944 she married Harishwar Dayal, an Indian civil servant who later became the Indian Ambassador to the United States and Nepal. He died in May 1964 while on a trip to the Khumbu area of Mount Everest. She later settled in Ranikhet, in Uttarakhand, India. Her house there was inherited by her nephew, the Oxford University Press editor and publisher Ravi Dayal.
