= Doreen Sansoni =

Sri Lankan tennis player

- Country (sports): (Dominion of Ceylon)
- Born: 11 October 1911 Negombo, British Ceylon.
- Died: 22 June 1977 (aged 65) Sri Lanka
- Turned pro: 1931
- Retired: 1947

Singles
- Career titles: 13

Doubles
- Career titles: 15

Thomasine Doreen Sansoni (11 October 1911 – 22 June 1977) was a Sri Lankan tennis player and national No. 1. She won a total of twenty eight career titles in singles, doubles and mixed doubles from 1935 to 1946. Adaptable at competing on two natural surfaces she won titles on both clay and grass courts. She remains the most successful Sri Lankan female player.

== Tennis career ==
Sansoni began her tennis career in 1931. In April 1933 she reached the semi-finals of the national championships played at the Hill Club in Nuwara Eliya. She won her first singles at the Ceylon Championships in 1935. At the same event that year she earned the distinction of being the first female player to achieve the triple crown by winning both the doubles and mixed doubles. In 1936 she successfully defended her Ceylon Championships title and won the event a further five times, (1937-1940, 1946) her seven singles titles remain a national record she shares with British colonial player Mrs. G. D. H. (Tiny) Alston. In addition she won the Malayan Championships four straight times from 1936 to 1939. In December 1945 she won the singles title at the Bengal Championships in Calcutta, India defeating M. Nolan in straight sets. Her final title came at the All India Championships in January 1946 where she won the singles title, defeating Sarah Mody in three sets. Sansoni was also a successful doubles player, winning the Ceylon ladies doubles championships four times and the mixed doubles championship eight times, partnering with her cousin Hildon Sansoni. Her combined nineteen national titles remain a record. She won the Malayan Championships doubles title in 1936 and the mixed doubles title in 1938. She won the doubles title at the 1941 All India Championships in Baroda, partnering with Indian player Khanum Haji.

== Playing style ==
The best lady players in the years 1930 to 1940 were Gertrude Steiger, Clodagh Wright, Nedra Obeyesekera, Doreen Sansoni and Amy Rock.From 1935 Doreen proved she was in a class of her own by remaining unbeaten from 1935 to 1940. She had every shot in the game and served, drove, chopped and smashed with force and accuracy. Her volleying was so good that I have seen her hold her own against men both here and in India when positioned near the net. She was not physically strong but she had grit. She holds with Mrs. Alston the distinction of having been Singles’ Champion on 7 occasions. She won the title again in 1946 when the Championships were renewed. There was no competition from 1942 to 1945 owing to the War

— University of Adelaide, Sri Lankan Historian, Dr. Michael Roberts, 3 May 2016, Tennis in Sri Lanka: Halcyon Days, 1915–1990

== Personal life ==
Sansoni was born in Negombo into a prominent Burgher family. Her father was Waldo Sansoni, (1883-1966 ), OBE, a former lieutenant colonel commanding the Ceylon Light Infantry regiment, who later became a district judge, and her mother was Thomasin Gertrude Harriet Schrader, (1889-1941) Sansoni had four siblings from her father's first marriage.

== Career finals ==
=== Singles (15) titles (13) runner's up (2) ===
Legend (13-2)
Win
Loss

| Result | No. | Date | Tournament | Location | Surface | Opponent | Score |
|---|---|---|---|---|---|---|---|
| Win | 1. | April 1935 | Ceylon Championships | Nuwara Eliya | Clay | (United Kingdom) Amy Rock | ? |
| Win | 2. | April 1936 | Ceylon Championships | Nuwara Eliya | Clay | (British Ceylon) Nedra Obeysekera | 6-1 5-7 6-4 |
| Win | 3. | August 1936 | Malayan Championships | Ipoh | Grass | (United Kingdom) Gwendolin Ailin | 3–6, 6–3, 6–1 |
| Win | 4. | April 1937 | Ceylon Championships | Nuwara Eliya | Clay | (India) Laura Woodbridge | 7–5, 7–5 |
| Win | 5. | August 1937 | Malayan Championships | Kuala Lumpur | Grass | (United Kingdom) Betty Humphrey | 6–1, 6–1 |
| Win | 6. | April 1938 | Ceylon Championships | Nuwara Eliya | Clay | (United Kingdom) Mrs Thomas | ? |
| Win | 7. | August 1938 | Malayan Championships | Singapore | Grass | (United Kingdom) Joyce Grenier | 6–4, 6–1 |
| Win | 8. | April 1939 | Ceylon Championships | Nuwara Eliya | Clay | (India) Laura Woodbridge | 7–5, 4–6, 6–4 |
| Win | 9. | August 1939 | Malayan Championships | Ipoh | Grass | (United Kingdom) Gwendolin Moon Ailin | 6–2, 6–3 |
| Win | 10. | April 1940 | Ceylon Championships | Nuwara Eliya | Clay | (United Kingdom) Sheila Roberts | 6–1, 6–4 |
| Loss | 11. | February 1945 | All India Lawn Tennis Championship | Madras | Grass | (India) Laura Woodbridge | 6–3, 2–6, 0–6 |
| Win | 12. | December 1945 | Bengal Championships | Calcutta | Grass | (United Kingdom) M. Nolan | 6–4, 6–2 |
| Win | 13 | January 1946 | All India Lawn Tennis Championship | Calcutta | Grass | (India) Sera Mody | 6–1, 10–12, 6–0 |
| Win | 14. | April 1946 | Ceylon Championships | Nuwara Eliya | Clay | (British Ceylon) Sheila Roberts | 7-5, 6-3 |
| Loss | 15. | January 1947 | Southern India Championships | Madras | Grass | (British Ceylon) Sheila Roberts | 2-6, 6-4, 4-6 |

== Sources ==
- Altendorf, D. V. "GENEALOGY OF THE FAMILY OF SANSONI OF CEYLON VOL 49" (PDF). thedutchburgherunion.org. Sri Lankan Dutch Burgher Union. 1959.
