= Marion Law =

New Zealand netball and tennis player (1940–2020)

Personal information
- Full name: Marion Patricia Law (Née: Johnston)
- Born: 1 June 1940 Wellington, New Zealand
- Died: 25 November 2020 (aged 80) Churton Park, New Zealand
- Height: 1.68 m (5 ft 6 in)
- Spouse: Douglas Law (m. 1963)

Netball career
- Playing positions: WD, GD
Years	National team	Caps
1960	New Zealand	2

Marion Patricia Law (née Johnston; 1 June 1940 – 25 November 2020) was a New Zealand netball and tennis player. As a netballer, she played two Tests for New Zealand against Australia in 1960. She won both the women's singles and women's doubles titles at the National Lawn Tennis Championships of India in 1965.

== Early life ==
Law was born Marion Patricia Johnston in Wellington on 1 June 1940, the daughter of Wesley Johnston and Hilda Mary Johnston (née Roberts) of Miramar. After leaving school, she found employment as a shorthand typist.

== Sporting career ==
=== Netball ===
Johnston played netball for the Wellington East Old Girls' club, and was a Wellington provincial representative. Her preferred playing position was at wing defence, but she could also cover wing attack, goal defence and centre.

In 1960, Johnston was selected for the New Zealand team that toured Australia that year, and played in two of the three Test matches.

=== Tennis ===
At the New Zealand national tennis championships in January 1959, played at Wilding Park, Christchurch, Johnston reached the quarter-finals of the women's singles, where she was defeated 6–4, 6–4 by Betty Nelson. The following month, Johnston lost to Ruia Morrison 6–1, 6–2 in the quarter-finals of the Auckland international invitation tournament at Stanley Street. Later that year, Johnston was named as the top-ranked junior women's player in New Zealand.

In early January 1960, Johnston was defeated by Ruia Morrison, 6–3, 6–4, in the women's singles final at the North Island tennis championships in Hamilton. The following week, at the national championships in Auckland, Johnston again lost to Morrison, this time in the semi-finals of the women's singles, 6–1, 6–4. In the final of the women's doubles, Johnston and her partner Judy Davidson were beaten, 6–2, 6–4, by Ruia Morrison and Heather Robson. Johnston was again beaten by Morrison the following month, in the women's singles semi-finals of the Auckland international invitation tournament, going down 6–0, 6–1. Playing with Margaret Smith, Johnston was also defeated in the final of the women's doubles, 6–3, 6–1, by Morrison and Judy Tinnock. In the New Zealand rankings released later that year, Johnston was listed as the fifth-ranked women's player.

In 1961. Ruia Morrison beat Johnston, 6–3, 6–2, in the North Island women's singles final. At the New Zealand national championships in Wellington, Johnston and her partner Judy Davidson defeated Morrison and Raewyn Ferkins, 4–6, 6–4, 6–3, in the final of the women's doubles. However, Johnston lost to Morrison, 6–1, 6–3, in the quarter-finals of the women's singles. At the end of the 1960–61 season, Johnston's national ranking had gone up one place to fourth.

At the 1962 national tennis championships in Christchurch, Johnston lost in the quarter-finals of the women's singles to Patsy Belton, 4–6, 6–2, 6–4. The following year, she reached the women's singles semi-finals at the New Zealand championships, before being defeated by Judy Davison, 3–6, 8–6, 6–1.

At the 1965 National Lawn Tennis Championships of India, played in New Delhi, Law defeated Asian champion Nirupama Vasant, 6–4, 6–4, in the final of the women's singles. With her partner, Begum Khan, Law also won the women's doubles championship, defeating Nirupama Vasant and Leela Punjabi 2–6, 6–3, 6–3 in the final. The following year, at the Indian championships, Law beat American Carol Prosen 6–0, 5–7, 6–1 in the women's singles semi-finals, but was defeated by the Soviet player Tiiu Soome in the final, 6–2, 3–6, 6–4.

== Later life ==
Johnston married diplomat Douglas Law in 1963, and they spent many years overseas on various diplomatic postings. Marion Law remained an active tennis player, winning the mixed doubles in the annual diplomatic tennis competition in Canberra in 1969, and finishing second in the women's singles at the Australian Capital Territory resident championships in 1972. After retiring, they returned to live permanently in Wellington.

Law maintained her involvement in tennis as a member of the International Lawn Tennis Club of New Zealand, and she was a member of the Victoria Bridge Club. Law died in the Wellington suburb of Churton Park on 25 November 2020. Her husband, Douglas, died in Paraparaumu on 2 July 2021.
