= North West India Championships =

Defunct tennis tournament
- Founded: 1930; 95 years ago
- Abolished: 1939; 86 years ago
- Location: Karachi, India
- Surface: Grass

The North West India Championships was a combined men's and women's international tennis tournament founded in 1930. The championships were played in Karachi, India. The championships ran until 1939 before they was discontinued due to World War II.

== History ==
Tennis was introduced to India in the 1880s by British Army and Civilian Officers. In 1930 the North West India Championships were founded in Karachi, then in the undivided India as an international tennis tournament. The championships ran until 1939 before they was discontinued due to World War Two. Following the partition of India in 1947 and the creation of Pakistan as a sovereign state this tournament was revived as the All-Pakistan Championships in 1949 held in Lahore.
