= Khanum Haji =

Indian tennis player

- Full name: Khanum Haji Singh
- Country (sports): India
- Turned pro: 1946 (amateur)
- Retired: 1957

Singles
- Career titles: 8

Mixed doubles

Team competitions

Khanum Singh (née Haji) (Urdu: خانم حاجی) was an Indian tennis player from Hyderabad. She was the women's four-time champion at the National Lawn Tennis Championships of India from 1947 to 1949, and 1957.

== Career ==
Singh a four-time winner of the National Lawn Tennis Championships of India (1947–49, 1957). In 1957 she also won the Northern India Championships in New Delhi defeating Mrs. J.B. Singh 4-6 7-5 6–1. She won Southern India Championships held at Madras also in 1957 against Mrs Sarah Mody, and defeated her again in the same year at the Western India Championships held in Bombay.

== Career finals ==
=== Singles (8–0) ===
Result	No.	Year	Title	Location	Surface	Opponent	Score
Win	1.	1947	National Lawn Tennis Championships of India	Allahabad, India	Grass	(India) Laura Woodbridge	w.o.
Win	2.	1948	National Lawn Tennis Championships of India	Allahabad, India	Grass	(India) Promilla Khanna	0–6, 7–5, 4–6
Win	3.	1949	National Lawn Tennis Championships of India	Allahabad, India	Grass	(India) Promilla Khanna	3–6, 9–7, 6–3
Win	4.	1949	Western India Championships	Bombay, India	?	(India) Laura Woodbridge	6–4m 6–4
Win	5.	1957	Northern India Championships	New Delhi, India	Grass	(India) Mrs. J.B. Singh	4–6, 7–5, 6–1
Win	6	1957	National Lawn Tennis Championships of India	Calcutta, India	?	(India) Promilla Khanna Singh	7–5, 7–5
Win	7.	1957	Western India Championships	Bombay, India	?	(India) Mrs Sarah Mody	6–2 6–3
Win	8.	1957	Southern India Championships	Madras, India	?	(India) Mrs Sarah Mody	6–3 6–2
