= Jaidip Mukerjea =

Indian tennis player

- Country (sports): India
- Residence: Kolkata, India
- Born: 21 April 1942 (age 84) Calcutta, Bengal Presidency, British India
- Turned pro: 1968 (amateur tour from 1959)
- Retired: 1975
- Plays: Right-handed (one-handed backhand)

Singles
- Career record: 42–46
- Highest ranking: 120 (3 June 1974)

Grand Slam singles results
- Australian Open: 4R (1962)
- French Open: 4R (1965, 1966)
- Wimbledon: 4R (1963, 1964, 1966, 1973)
- US Open: 4R (1962)

Doubles
- Career record: 12–18

Grand Slam doubles results
- Australian Open: QF (1962)
- Wimbledon: QF (1966, 1967, 1973)

Mixed doubles

Grand Slam mixed doubles results
- Wimbledon: 1R (1963)

Team competitions
- Davis Cup: F (1966)

Jaidip Mukerjea (Bengali: জয়দীপ মুখোপাধ্যায়; born 21 April 1942) is a retired professional tennis player from India.

== Personal life ==
Mukerjea is the grandson of Indian independence leader Chittaranjan Das. He completed his schooling from La Martiniere Calcutta.

== Tennis career ==
=== Juniors ===
Mukerjea won the Indian National Junior Championship in 1959. He then began to play overseas, and was the runner-up at the Wimbledon Boys' Singles tournament in 1960.

=== Amateur/Pro tour ===
Mukerjea's international breakout year came in 1962, when he made the fourth round of the U.S. Championships. He reached the fourth round at Wimbledon in 1963 and 1964, and reached the fourth round at the French Championships in 1965.

1966 was Mukerjea's most successful year. He again reached the fourth round at the French Championships and Wimbledon. He was also a member of the India Davis Cup team that reached the final. Mukerjea won India's only rubber in the final; he and Ramanathan Krishnan defeated John Newcombe and Tony Roche in doubles. For his accomplishments, Mukerjea was given the Arjuna Award in 1966.

During his career, Mukerjea won at least 6 singles titles, including the Asian Championships three times.

== After retirement ==
Mukerjea currently operates a Tennis Academy in Calcutta bearing his name, and he has served as tournament director for the Sunfeast Open, as well as Davis Cup Captain for India.

== Singles titles (10) ==
Result	No.	Date	Tournament	Location	Surface	Opponent	Score
Win	1.	1963	Adelboden International	Adelboden	Clay	(United Kingdom) Jaroslav Drobný	4–6, 6–1, 6–2
Win	2.	1965	Indore International	Indore		(United Kingdom) Michael Sangster	7–5, 6–2, 6–1
Win	3.	1966	Finland International Championships	Helsinki		(United States) Allen Fox	7–5, 4–6, 10–8
Win	4.	1966	Asian Championships	Calcutta		(India) Ramanathan Krishnan	6–4, 6–3, 6–2
Win	5.	1966	Central India Championships	Allahabad		(Greece) Nicholas Kalogeropoulos	6–3, 4–6, 4–6, 6–4, 6–2
Win	6.	1966	India National and Northern India Championships	New Delhi		(India) Premjit Lall	4–6, 6–3, 6–4, 6–0
Win	7.	1967	Western India Championships	Bombay		(Australia) Bob Carmichael	5–7, 4–6, 6–2, 6–3, 6–3
Win	8.	1969	Asian Championships	Calcutta		(United States) Bill Tym	6–2, 6–1, 6–0
Win	9.	1971	India National Championships	Delhi		(India) Premjit Lall	7–5, 6–3, 6–3
Win	10.	1972	Asian Championships	Poona		(India) Vijay Amritraj	1–6, 6–3, 6–4, 6–4
