= Sindh Championships =

Defunct tennis tournament
- Tour: ILTF Asian Circuit
- Founded: 1912; 113 years ago
- Abolished: 1977; 48 years ago
- Location: Hyderabad; Karachi
- Surface: Grass / outdoor

The Sindh Championships was a grass court tennis tournament founded in 1912 as the Sindh Lawn Tennis Championships. It was first played in Karachi, India until 1940 when it was stopped due to the second world war. It resumed after World War II, and was then last played in Hyderabad, India in 1977. The event was part of the ILTF Asian Circuit.
