= Aleksandra Ivanova =

Soviet Russian tennis player

Aleksandra Anatolyevna Ivanova
- Native name: Александра Анатольевна Иванова
- Country (sports): Soviet Union
- Born: 9 July 1949 (age 76) USSR

Singles

Grand Slam singles results
- French Open: 2R (1971)

Aleksandra Alla Anatolyevna Ivanova (Russian: Александра Анатольевна Иванова; born 9 July 1949) is a retired female tennis player who competed for the Soviet Union.

She competed in the singles event at the 1971 French Open. In the first round, the fifth-seeded West German Helga Masthoff withdrew, allowing Ivanova to advance to the second round by walkover. She was defeated in the second round by British player Winnie Shaw.

Ivanova played tennis in the 1960s and 1970s. She retired from professional tennis in the mid-1970s.

== Career finals ==
=== Singles (7–3) ===
Result	No.	Year	location	Surface	Opponent	Score
Win	1.	January 1967	New Delhi, India	Hard	(Soviet Union) Rena Abzhandadze	8–6, 6–3
Loss	1	January 1967	Calcutta, India	Hard	(Soviet Union) Rena Abzhandadze	4–6, 0–6
Loss	2.	July 1967	Košice, Czechoslovakia	Clay	(Czechoslovakia) Vlasta Vopičková	7–6, 3–6, 4–6
Win	3.	January 1968	Bangalore, India	Hard	(Soviet Union) Nina Turkheli	6–1, 6–2
Win	4.	January 1968	New Delhi, India	Hard	(Soviet Union) Nina Turkheli	6–2, 6–3
Win	5.	January 1968	Bombay, India	Hard	(India) Nirupama Mankad	6–4, 6–3
Win	6.	January 1970	Amritsar, India	Hard	(Socialist Federal Republic of Yugoslavia) Irena Škulj	6–1, 6–3
Loss	3.	January 1970	New Delhi, India	Hard	(Soviet Union) Rena Abzhandadze	7–9, 3–6
Win	7.	January 1970	Calcutta, India	Hard	(Soviet Union) Nina Turkheli	6–2, 6–3

=== Doubles (10–5) ===
Result	No.	Year	location	Surface	Partner	Opponents	Score
Win	1.	February 1966	Moscow, Soviet Union	Hard (i)	(Soviet Union) Rena Abzhandadze	(Soviet Union) Galina Baksheeva (Soviet Union) Irina Ermolova	6–2, 1–6, 6–4
Loss	1.	October 1966	Alma Ata, Soviet Union	Hard (i)	(Soviet Union) Irina Ermolova	(Soviet Union) Galina Baksheeva (Soviet Union) Valeria Kuzmenko Titova	2–6, 2–6
Win	2.	January 1967	New Delhi, India	Hard	(Soviet Union) Rena Abzhandadze	(United Kingdom) Begum Khan (India) Rita Suriya	3–6, 6–0, 6–1
Win	3.	January 1967	Calcutta, India	Hard	(Soviet Union) Rena Abzhandadze	(India) Nirupama Mankad (India) Rita Suriya	6–3, 7–5
Loss	2.	September 1967	Bratislava, Czechoslovakia	Clay	(Czechoslovakia) Vlasta Vopičková	(France) Évelyne Terras (Czechoslovakia) Marie Neumanová	1–6, 3–6
Win	4.	September 1967	Tbilisi, Soviet Union	Clay	(Soviet Union) Galina Baksheeva	(Soviet Union) Rena Abzhandadze (Soviet Union) Eugenia Isopaitis	6–3, 7–5
Win	5.	January 1968	Bangalore, India	Hard	(Soviet Union) Nina Turkheli	(India) Nirupama Mankad (India) Jeroo Vakil	6–0, 6–1
Win	6.	January 1968	New Delhi, India	Hard	(Soviet Union) Nina Turkheli	(India) Susan Das (India) Rattan Thadani	6–0, 6–0
Win	7.	January 1968	Bombay, India	Hard	(Soviet Union) Nina Turkheli	(India) Nirupama Mankad (India) Rattan Thadani	6–2, 6–3
Win	8.	January 1970	Amritsar, India	Hard	(Socialist Federal Republic of Yugoslavia) Irena Škulj	(India) Nirupama Mankad (India) Indu Sood	6–2, 6–1
Loss	3.	January 1970	New Delhi, India	Hard	(Socialist Federal Republic of Yugoslavia) Irena Škulj	(Soviet Union) Rena Abzhandadze (Soviet Union) Nina Turkheli	4–6, 3–6
Win	9.	January 1970	Calcutta, India	Hard	(Socialist Federal Republic of Yugoslavia) Irena Škulj	(Soviet Union) Rena Abzhandadze (Soviet Union) Nina Turkheli	7–5, 2–6, 6–4
Loss	4.	February 1971	Sievierodonetsk, Soviet Union	Hard (i)	(Soviet Union) Anna Yeremeyeva	(Soviet Union) Rauza Islanova (Soviet Union) Eugenia Isopaitis	3–6, 4–6
Loss	5.	October 1972	Donetsk, Soviet Union	Hard (i)	(Soviet Union) Eugenia Isopaitis	(Soviet Union) Olga Morozova (Soviet Union) Zaiga Jansone	3–6, 3–6
Win	10.	July 1973	Kitzbühel, Austria	Clay	(Soviet Union) Olga Morozova	(Australia) Janet Young (Australia) Evonne Goolagong	2–6, 6–4, 6–2
