= Bill Tym =

American tennis player

- Full name: William A. Tym
- Country (sports): United States
- Born: 3 April 1940
- Died: 15 January 2026 (aged 85)
- Turned pro: 1959 (amateur)
- Retired: 1977

Singles

Grand Slam singles results
- French Open: 2R (1966)
- Wimbledon: Q1 (1969)
- US Open: 2R (1966)

William A. Tym is an American former tennis player.

== Tennis career ==
Tym, raised in Montville, New Jersey, attended Boonton High School and played collegiate tennis for the University of Florida. In 1963 he was SEC champion at No. 1 singles and earned All-American honors, reaching the quarter-finals of the NCAA singles championships. During the 1960s he featured in the six editions of the US Open and played in doubles main draws at Wimbledon. From 1987 to 1996 he served as the men's head coach of Vanderbilt University. He was the personal coach of tennis player Bryan Shelton.

== Personal life ==
Tym is married to former collegiate tennis coach Alice Luthy.
