= Rita Davar =

Indian tennis player

- Country (sports): India
- Born: 3 June 1935
- Turned pro: 1952 (amateur)
- Retired: 1961

Singles
- Career titles: 6

Mixed doubles

Rita Davar (born 3 June 1935) is an Indian tennis player. She was the first Indian to reach the tennis Grand Slam finals. Davar lost to Fenny ten Bosch in the 1952 Junior-Girls Wimbledon Championship with the 5–7, 6–1, 7–5 scores. Her other tennis achievements include winning the Northern India Championships (1953), Southern India Championships (1954), National Lawn Tennis Championships of India (1954 and 1955), and the Indian Championship (1954 and 1955).
