= Ghaus Mohammad =

Indian tennis player

Ghaus Mohammad Khan
- Country (sports): India
- Born: 2 November 1915
- Died: 1982 (Age 67)
- Turned pro: 1932 (Amateur)
- Retired: 1948
- Plays: Right-handed (one-handed backhand)

Singles
- Career record: 115/41 (73.71%)
- Career titles: 35

Grand Slam singles results
- French Open: 3R (1938)
- Wimbledon: QF (1939)

Doubles

Grand Slam doubles results
- Wimbledon: 3R (1947)

Ghaus Mohammad Khan (2 November 1915 – 1982) was an Indian tennis player from Malihabad. He was the first Indian to reach the quarterfinals at Wimbledon, achieved in 1939 where he lost to second-seeded and eventual champion Bobby Riggs. With compatriot Iftikar Ahmed he reached the third round in the doubles event in 1947. He was active from 1932 until 1948 and won 35 career titles in singles.

== Career ==
Khan played his first tournament in 1932 at the India International Championships where he lost in the fourth round to the Italian player Emanuele Sertorio. He won his first title in 1937 at the East India Championships held in Calcutta where he defeated Subba L.R. Sawhney. In 1938 he reached the third round at the French Championships at Roland Garros, he then played and won the Sheffield and Hallamshire Championships against the New Zealander Cam Malfroy at Sheffield, South Yorkshire. Following that win he then picked up the Hastings and St. Leonard's-on-Sea Tournament title against New Zealand player Dennis Coombe. The same year he was a semi finalist at the London Championships held at the Queens Club.

In grand slam tournament play his best result came at the 1939 Wimbledon Championships when he reached the quarter-finals stage, the same year he won the Essex Championships against John Olliff, this year he was also a losing finalist at the Irish Lawn Tennis Championships in Dublin, and the London Hard Court Championships played on clay at Hurlingham, both times against Murray Deloford. He won the All India Championships five times from (1939, 1941, 1943–44, 1946) and the Sindh Lawn Tennis Championships three times between (1938–1940). In 1940 he won the Rifah-I-Am AC tournament at Lucknow against Franjo Kukuljevic. In 1941 at Baroda he won the All India Covered Court Championships.

In 1942 he won the Bombay Presidency Hard Court Championship on clay courts, and the Western India Championships both at Bombay. In 1947 he won the Middlesex Championships at Chiswick Park, London, the same year he also won the Bury and West Suffolk Tournament against the American player Richard Colby at Bury St Edmunds, and the Hull Open at Kingston upon Hull, and was a losing finalist at the North of England Championships in Scarborough against Ignacy Tloczynski. He played and won his final tournament in 1948 at the Ceylon Championships against Frederick John de Saram at the Hill Club, Nuwara Eliya, in what was then British Ceylon (now Sri Lanka).

For this efforts in the realm of sports Mohammad Khan received the Padma Shri award from the Government of India in 1971.
