= Irena Škulj =

Yugoslav tennis player

- Country (sports): Yugoslavia
- Born: 17 January 1946 (age 79)

Singles

Grand Slam singles results
- French Open: 2R (1968)

Grand Slam mixed doubles results
- French Open: 1R (1970)

Irena Škulj (born 17 January 1946) is a former Yugoslavian tennis player.

Playing for Yugoslavia in the Fed Cup, Škulj has accumulated a win/loss record of 0–4. In 1968 French Open singles Didn't play in the first round. She withdrew from the tournament in the second round.

== Career finals ==
=== Singles (0–4) ===
Result	No.	Year	location	Surface	Opponent	Score
Loss	1	September 1967	Belgrade, Yugoslavia	Clay	(West Germany) Almut Sturm	4–6, 1–6
Loss	2.	September 1969	Belgrade, Yugoslavia	Clay	(Hungary) Erzsébet Széll	3–6, 4–6
Loss	3.	January 1970	Amritsar, India	Hard	(Soviet Union) Aleksandra Ivanova	1–6, 3–6
Loss	4.	January 1970	Andhra Pradesh, India	Clay	(Soviet Union) Nina Turkheli	4–6, 4–6

=== Doubles (7–4) ===
Result	No.	Year	location	Surface	Partner	Opponents	Score
Win	1.	September 1966	Belgrade, Yugoslavia	Clay	(Socialist Federal Republic of Yugoslavia) Alenka Pipan	(Bulgaria) Maria Chakarova (Bulgaria) Lubka Radkova	4–6, 6–2, 6–3
Loss	1.	September 1966	Opatija, Yugoslavia	Clay	(Socialist Federal Republic of Yugoslavia) Lena Dvornik	(Czechoslovakia) Olga Lendlová (Czechoslovakia) Vlasta Kodešová	1–6, 2–6
Win	2.	August 1968	Belgrade, Yugoslavia	Clay	(Argentina) Mabel Vrancovich	(Socialist Federal Republic of Yugoslavia) Lena Dvornik (Socialist Federal Republic of Yugoslavia) Alenka Pipan	6–0, 6–1
Win	3.	August 1969	Bad Neuenahr, West Germany	Clay	(West Germany) Helga Niessen Masthoff	(Japan) Junko Sawamatsu (Japan) Katsuko Sawamatsu	6–2, 6–3
Loss	2.	September 1969	Belgrade, Yugoslavia	Clay	(Socialist Federal Republic of Yugoslavia) Alenka Pipan	(Hungary) Katalin Borka (Hungary) Erzsébet Széll	1–6, 3–6
Win	4.	January 1970	Amritsar, India	Hard	(Soviet Union) Aleksandra Ivanova	(India) Nirupama Mankad (India) Indu Sood	6–2, 6–1
Loss	3.	January 1970	New Delhi, India	Hard	(Soviet Union) Aleksandra Ivanova	(Soviet Union) Rena Abzhandadze (Soviet Union) Nina Turkheli	4–6, 3–6
Win	5.	January 1970	Andhra Pradesh, India	Hard	(Soviet Union) Nina Turkheli	(India) Indu Sood (India) Rattan Thadani	6–3, 6–1
Win	6.	January 1970	Calcutta, India	Hard	(Soviet Union) Aleksandra Ivanova	(Soviet Union) Rena Abzhandadze (Soviet Union) Nina Turkheli	7–5, 2–6, 6–4
Win	7.	August 1970	Budapest, Hungary	Clay	(Soviet Union) Eugenia Isopaitis	(Hungary) Ágnes Graczol (Hungary) Éva Szabó	6–1, 6–3
Loss	4.	September 1972	Split, Yugoslavia	Clay	(Socialist Federal Republic of Yugoslavia) Lena Dvornik	(Socialist Federal Republic of Yugoslavia) Mima Jaušovec (Socialist Federal Republic of Yugoslavia) Alenka Pipan	5–7, 4–6
