= Jack Arkinstall =

Australian tennis player

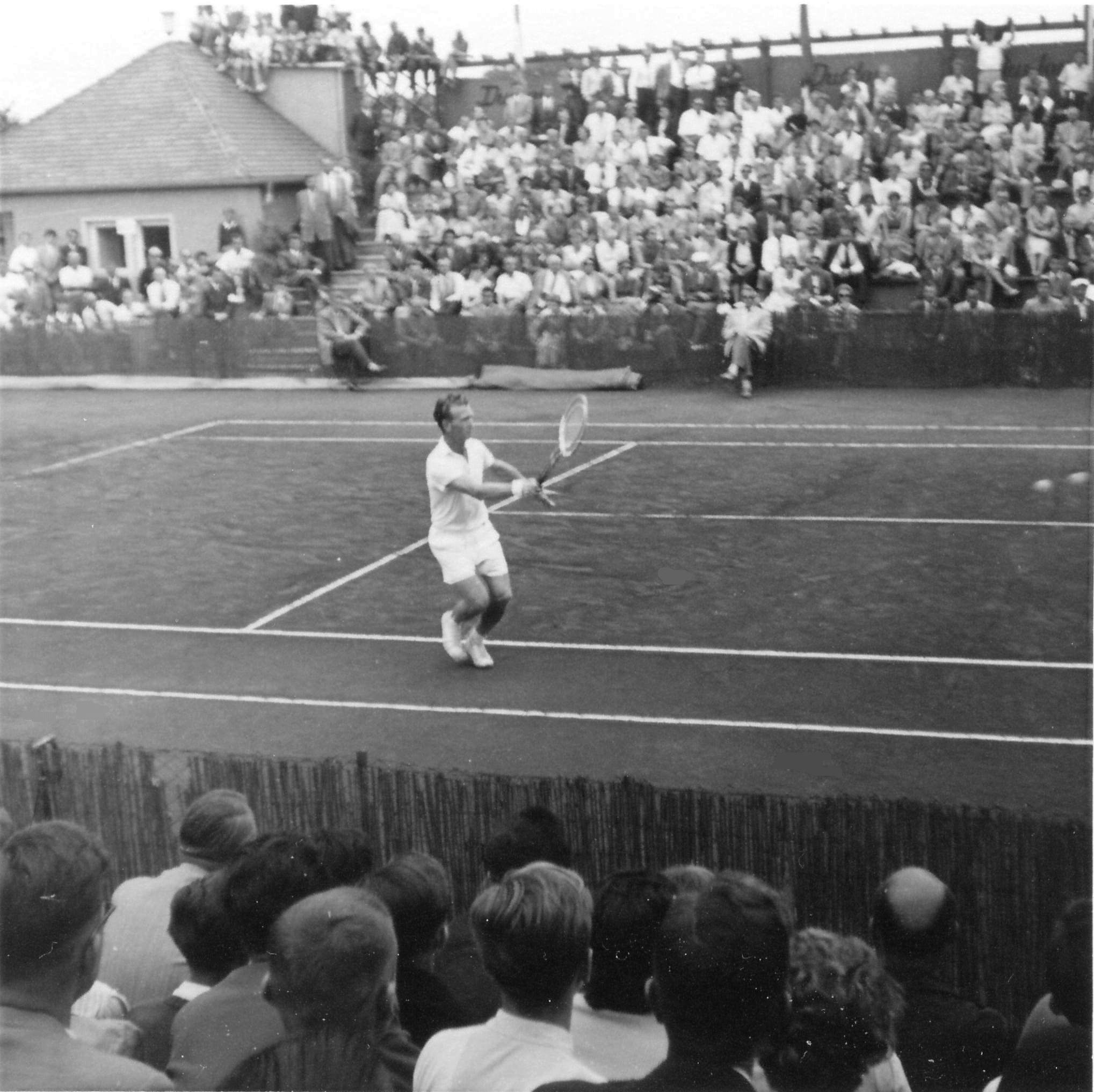
- Jack Arkinstall in 1955 at the Erlangen International tournament West Germany
- Country (sports): Australia
- Residence: Sydney, New South Wales, Australia
- Born: 8 November 1925 Sydney, New South Wales, Australia
- Died: 25 May 2000 (aged 74) Sydney, New South Wales, Australia (aged 75)
- Turned pro: 1958 (amateur from 1946)
- Retired: 1962

Singles
- Career record: 332–121
- Career titles: 60

Grand Slam singles results
- Australian Open: 2R (1953)
- French Open: 3R (1954)
- Wimbledon: 4R (1953)

Other tournaments
- Professional majors
- US Pro: SF (1962)
- Wembley Pro: 1R (1958, 1959, 1960)
- French Pro: 4R (1959, 1960)
- Other pro events

Jack Arkinstall (8 November 1925 – 25 May 2000) was an Australian tennis player. He was a semi-finalist at the 1962 U.S. Pro Tennis Championships. He was active on the ILTF World Circuit from 1946 to 1958, then on the Pro Tennis Tour until 1962, and won 60 amateur and professional singles titles.

== Career ==
Arkinstall came from a poor family, however his father laid a private tennis court on the property of the family farm. He was asked in 1959 by tennis promoter Jack Kramer to become a professional tennis player. He was about the same age as two other Australian players, Bill Sidwell and Dinny Pails.

=== Amateur ===
He played and won his first title at the Northern Rivers Championships in 1946. Arkinstall had a lengthy amateur tennis player, and traveled the world. He won numerous matches and international tennis tournaments, however never reached the top of his country. At the Wimbledon Championships he reached the fourth round in 1953 when he was in the fifth set against in his compatriot Ken Rosewall, whom he had lost against previously. At Wimbledon in 1954 Arkinstall lost in the first round against the eventual champion, Yugoslav Jaroslav Drobny. He competed again in 1955 at Wimbledon, this time reaching the third round to fall against Drobny. At Wimbledon in 1956, Arkinstall lost to the eventual semifinalist, American Ham Richardson. In his last appearance at Wimbledon 1957, he lost in the first round in a large defeat against the Brit Mike Davies.

He never won the Australian Open Championships or any other Grand Slam tournament. Once he played against Rosewall in his professional career and lost narrowly in the final, fifth set. Arkinstall broke through late into international tennis. In 1950, when he was thirty years old, he played his first international tennis tournament. In 1954, Arkinstall won in the final against the number one player from India Ramanathan Krishnan. He won the Yugoslavian Championships that year against the number one Yugoslav Jaroslav Drobny. In 1954 he won the All India Hard Court Championships in Madras, and again in 1956. In an indoor tournament India Krishnan revenged himself by winning the final against Arkinstall. In 1956 Arkinstall played the Nation Cup for his country - he lost the men's doubles match with Lew Hoad against his Italian opponents Guiseppo Merlo and Orlando Sirola (numbers two). He won his last amateur title and the 1957 Bochum International. He played his final amateur event at the 1957 Wimbledon Championships.

=== Professional career ===
In 1958, he played as a professional in his debut at the Wembley Championships in London when he lost the first round of his compatriot Frank Sedgman. The year after Arkinstall played back on Wembley Championships and he again lost against compatriot Ashley Cooper. At the French Pro Championship in 1959 Arkinstall was defeated in the fourth round and repeated that at the tournament in 1960. In 1960, Arkinstall played at the Wembley Pro and again lost in the first round, this time against the Spaniard Andrés Gimeno, the Spanish number one. In 1962, he competed as a pro in the US Pro Championships reaching the quarterfinal against Earl Buchholz. That was his last year in professional tennis.

He won his first pro title in 1958 at the German Pro International Championships held in Bad Ems against Pat Molloy, and won his second and final pro title at the 1961 Southern Pro Championships held in Jacksonville, Florida against Don Budge.

== Retirement ==
After his active career as a tennis pro was Jack Arkinstall coach of the young Manuel Santana from Spain. He was the number five of Australia in the time he Frank Sedgman (1), Ken McGregor (2), Mervyn Rose (3) and Dinny Pails (4) had, but was higher than his countrymen Geoffrey Brown ('24) Bill Sidwell ('20), Bob Howe ('25) Rex Hartwig ('29), Ian Ayre ('29), George Worthington ('28) and Don Tregonning ('29); before the next generation of Australian tennis players in picture came with, among others, Ken Rosewall. Jack Arkinstall wrote in 1967 a book titled The Arkinstall Tennis Rhythm Method.

== Arkinstall Park ==
In memory of the Arkinstall family, a sports centre, Arkinstall Park, exists at Tweed Heads, Australia. Upgrades to the park's existing facilities were announced in 2013. The park includes netball courts and clubhouse, tennis courts and clubhouse, BBQ area and playground.

Note: Arkinstall park in Hefron St South Tweed Heads was actually named after Jack's younger brother, Neville, who was a talented sportsman in his own right being accomplished as a hockey and cricket player as well as tennis.
