= Alice Tym =

American tennis player

Biographical details
- Born: November 22, 1942 (age 83); Peoria, Illinois, U.S.

Playing career
- 1961–1964: Florida

Coaching career (HC unless noted)
- 1975–1978: Chattanooga
- 1979–1982: Yale

Accomplishments and honors

Championships
- AIAW (1977, 1978); Ivy League (1980, 1981)

Awards
- ITA Hall of Fame; University of Florida Athletic Hall of Fame

Alice Luthy Tym (born November 22, 1942), née Alice Luthy, is a former American college and amateur tennis player who was ranked No.13 in the world in the mid-1960s. She later became a college tennis coach, tennis writer and university instructor. She was inducted into the Tennessee Tennis Hall of Fame in 2013.

== Early life and education ==
Luthy was born in Peoria, Illinois. She attended Peoria High School and graduated as the salutatorian of her class in 1960.

== College career ==
Tym attended the University of Florida in Gainesville, Florida, where she organized the Florida Gators women's tennis team, served as its captain and played No. 1 singles for the Lady Gators from 1960 to 1964. Tym graduated from the university with a bachelor's degree in English, with Phi Beta Kappa honors. As a Ford Foundation fellow, Tym later earned a master's degree in geography from the University of Florida in 1966.

== Playing career ==
After earning her first degree, Tym moved on to the international tennis circuit in 1962. At the 1964 Cincinnati Open tournament, she reached the singles final before falling to Jean Danilovich. Later that year, she paired with Hedy Rutzezeck to win the doubles title in the Canada Masters tournament.

She and her husband Bill Tym also won five events at the 1964 Western Canada Open Grass Court championships; both won their respective women's and men's singles and doubles events, and then won the mixed doubles event as a team.

Tym played on the international tennis circuit from 1962 to 1970, and played in all four Grand Slam events. She won 44 career tennis tournaments in Australia, Canada, Egypt, England, India, Ireland, Israel, Kenya, Mexico, Morocco and New Zealand (South Island Championships), and was a finalist in another 20 tournaments. Her career win-loss record in singles was 196–134. Tym's world ranking peaked at No. 13 in 1969.

== Coaching career ==
After ending her playing career, Tym established the Lady Mocs women's tennis team at the University of Tennessee at Chattanooga and was the head coach there from 1974 to 1978. In her four seasons as head coach, the Lady Mocs varsity women's program won two Association for Intercollegiate Athletics for Women (AIAW) Small College National Championships in 1977 and 1978. Tym became the head coach of the Yale Bulldogs women's tennis team at Yale University in New Haven, Connecticut in 1978. In four seasons coaching the Lady Bulldogs, her teams compiled an overall win–loss record of 60–14 (.811) and won Ivy League championships in 1980 and 1981.

== Life after tennis ==
Tym returned to UT-Chattanooga in 1982 to become a faculty member in the geography department. As of 2011, she continues to teach various geography courses at UT-Chattanooga.

She has been named Coach of the Year by the United States Professional Tennis Association, has been inducted into the Intercollegiate Tennis Association Women's Hall of Fame, the Greater Chattanooga Sports Hall of Fame, the Greater Peoria Sports Hall of Fame, and the University of Florida Athletic Hall of Fame as a "Gator Great".

She was a writer for World Tennis magazine and a member of the United States Tennis Writers Association. In 1983, the International Tennis Hall of Fame named her as its winner for th Tennis Educational Merit Award.

Luthy married William A. "Bill" Tym, a 1963 All-American for the Florida Gators men's tennis team, and a fellow University of Florida alumnus.

Alice Tym continued with competitive sports in retirement. She competed in 2023 National Senior Games in the sport of Pickleball.

== See also ==
- Chattanooga Mocs
- Florida Gators
- List of Florida Gators tennis players
- List of University of Florida alumni
- List of University of Florida Athletic Hall of Fame members
- Yale Bulldogs

== Bibliography ==
Smith, Phillip S., From Club Court to Center Court, Western Southern Financial Masters Women's Open, Cincinnati, Ohio (2008 ed.). ISBN 978-0-9712445-7-3.
