= Ramanathan Krishnan =

Indian tennis player

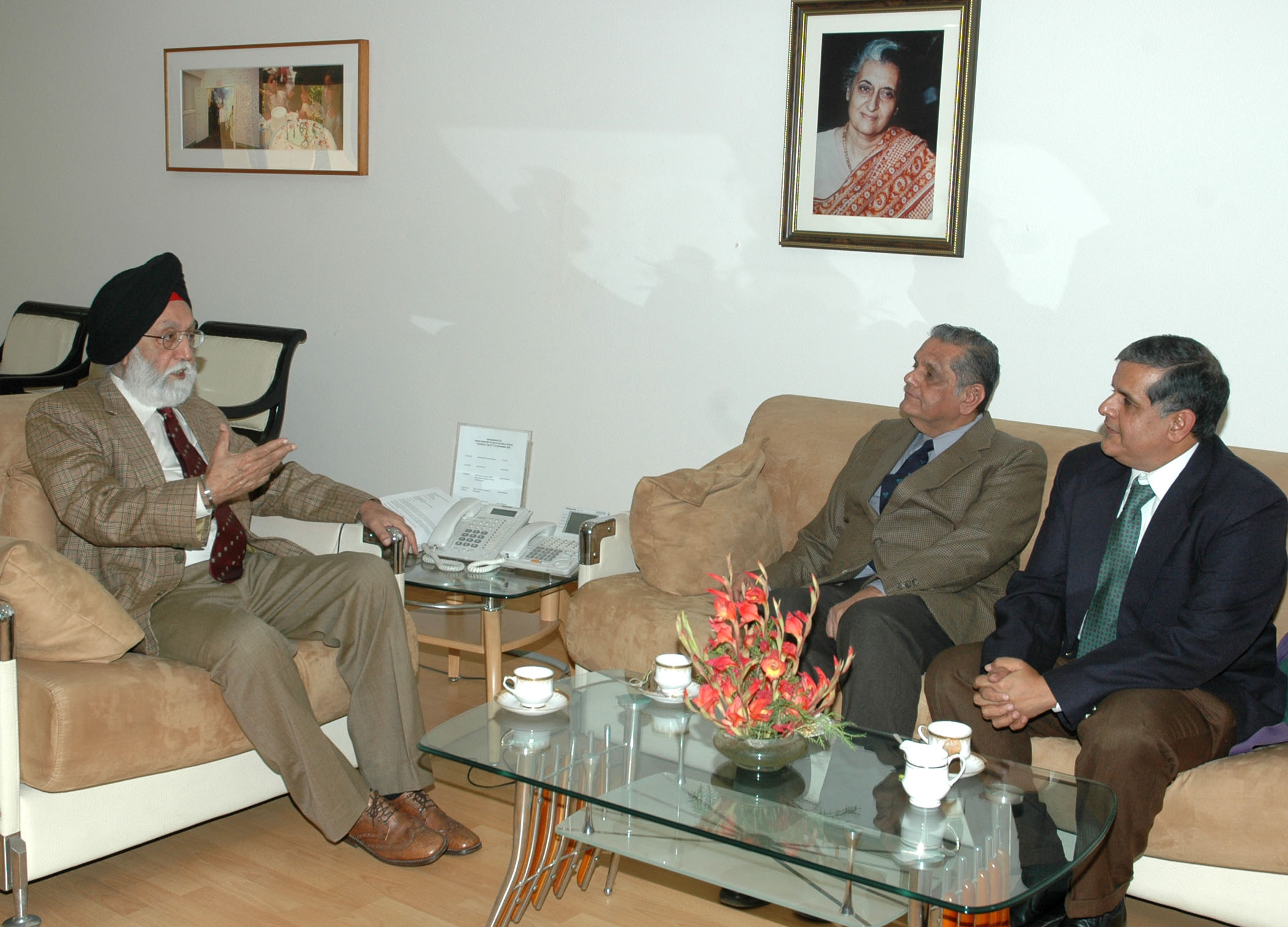
- Ramanathan Krishnan and Ramesh Krishnan with Union Minister of Youth Affairs and Sports, Dr. M.S. Gill in New Delhi, 2009.
- Country (sports): India
- Residence: Chennai, Tamil Nadu. India
- Born: 11 April 1937 (age 89) Nagercoil, Kingdom of Travancore, British India (now in Tamil Nadu, India)
- Turned pro: 1953 (amateur)
- Retired: 1975
- Plays: Right-handed (one-handed backhand)

Singles
- Career record: 512–176
- Career titles: 69
- Highest ranking: No. 3

Grand Slam singles results
- French Open: QF (1962)
- Wimbledon: SF (1960, 1961)
- US Open: 3R (1957, 1959)

Grand Slam doubles results
- Wimbledon: QF (1955, 1958, 1959, 1961, 1965, 1967)

Team competitions
- Davis Cup: F (1956, 1959, 1962, 1963, 1966^{Ch}, 1968)

Ramanathan Krishnan (born 11 April 1937) is a retired tennis player from India who was among the world's leading players in the 1950s and 1960s. He was twice a semifinalist at Wimbledon in 1960 and 1961, reaching as high as World No. 3 in Potter's amateur rankings. He led India to the Challenge Round of the 1966 Davis Cup against Australia and was the non playing captain when Vijay Amritraj and Anand Amritraj led India into the 1974 Davis Cup finals against South Africa. He was active from 1953 to 1975 and won 69 singles titles.

== Tennis career ==
=== Junior ===
Krishnan honed his skills under his father, T. K. Ramanathan, a veteran Nagercoil based player. He soon made his mark on the national circuit, sweeping all the junior titles. He as a 13-year-old school student sought and got special permission from the Principal Gordon of Loyola College to take part in the Bertram Tournament open only to college students and won it in 1951. Krishnan qualified for 1953 Wimbledon and reached final of Boys' singles title losing to Billy Knight. Later he joined and as a student of Loyola College won Junior Wimbledon in 1954. In 1954, he became the first Asian player to win the boys' singles title at Wimbledon, beating Ashley Cooper in the final.

=== Amateur ===
1957

In 1957, Krishnan reached the singles final at the Northern Lawn Tennis Championships at Manchester, defeating Roy Emerson and Robert Bédard, but losing the final to Lew Hoad in straight sets. Krishnan reached the final at the Canadian Open in 1957, losing a close final to Bédard, whom Krishnan had beaten several times in Britain that season.

1958

Krishnan would win the Northern Lawn Tennis Championships tournament in 1958, which included a close match win over Rod Laver. The same year he also won the Aix-Les-Bains International Tournament against Patricio Rodríguez.

1959

In 1959, Krishnan won the Queen's Club Championships title, defeating both Alex Olmedo and Neale Fraser in the final two rounds. He played in the men's singles competition at the 1959 Wimbledon losing in the third round to Olmedo. Krishnan rejected a record three-year $150,000 guarantee offer from Jack Kramer in 1959 after winning at Queen's Club. Later that same year, playing for India in the Davis Cup, Krishnan defeated Laver (the Wimbledon runner-up) in four sets. Krishnan also defeated Laver at the 1959 Pacific Southwest tournament in three straight sets. Krishnan won the 1959 U.S. Hard Court Championships in Denver with wins over Gardnar Mulloy in the semifinal and Whitney Reed in three straight sets in the final. Krishnan ranked World No. 3 in Potter's annual rankings for 1959 in World Tennis.

1960

These performances gained Krishnan seventh seeded status at Wimbledon in 1960, where he reached the semi-finals losing to the eventual champion Fraser. Krishnan defeated Andrés Gimeno in five sets on his way to the semifinal. Instead of Krishnan, Kramer signed Gimeno after Wimbledon for a much smaller guarantee than Krishnan had been offered.

1961-1962

Krishnan won the 1961 Wiesbaden tennis tournament, including a win over Wilhelm Bungert. In 1961, Krishnan again reached the Wimbledon semi-finals by beating Emerson in straight sets in the quarter-finals but lost in the semis to eventual champion Laver. The following season, he reached the quarterfinals at the French Open in 1962, where he led Emerson two sets to one, but strangely lost the fifth set at love. Krishnan received his highest seeding at Wimbledon at No. 4 in 1962 but had to withdraw after three matches due to an ongoing ankle injury.

1963-1967

Krishnan won the 1963 Antwerp International Championships tournament on red clay with a four-set win in the final over Nicola Pietrangeli. Krishnan won the 1965 River Oaks International Tennis Tournament at Houston, Texas with wins over Osuna, Emerson in the semi-final in four sets, and Richey in the final in four sets. He was reportedly given a winner's hug of congratulations by future President George H. W. Bush after the victory. In 1967 Krishnan won the Antwerp International Championships on red clay a second time by beating Emerson in the final in three straight sets. He won the National Lawn Tennis Championships of India a record eight times, and reached ten finals.

=== Registered professional ===
Krishnan, like Emerson, Stolle, Santana, Okker and other prominent "amateur" tennis players, became a registered professional with a national tennis association. He was under contract to his national tennis association, and not to an independent professional tour, and was therefore eligible to represent India in Davis Cup competition, but also received money earnings in designated tournaments approved by his national association.

=== Open era ===
Krishnan won the Canadian Open in 1968 over Torben Ulrich in the final. Krishnan lost to John Newcombe at the inaugural U.S. Open that year. However, Krishnan had a notable win over the hard-hitting Clark Graebner, a semifinalist at the 1968 U.S. Open, in Davis Cup play later that season, in which Graebner "was completely befuddled by the junk-balling tactics of Krishnan...losing decisively." Also that year, Krishnan won the Stuttgart tournament on red clay, which included a win over Jürgen Fassbender. After 1968, Krishnan played sporadically. Krishnan's last tournament was a first round loss at Calcutta in 1975 to Tom Gorman.

=== Davis Cup ===
Krishnan was a key member of the Indian team. In 1961, Krishnan had singles wins over both Chuck McKinley (Wimbledon finalist in 1961) and Whitney Reed (U.S. No. 1 for 1961), although India lost the tie 3 to 2. Krishnan led the India team to the Challenge Round of the Davis Cup in 1966, whilst also reaching the Inter-Zonal final with the team on five other occasions, in 1956, 1959, 1962, 1963 and 1968. India surprised West Germany in the inter-zonal semi-finals with Krishnan beating Wilhelm Bungert (a Wimbledon finalist later that year). At Calcutta, in the semi-finals against Brazil, the two sides won two matches each and it all came down to Krishnan's match against the Brazilian champion, Thomaz Koch. Koch was leading two sets to one and was up 5–2 in the fourth set when Krishnan staged one of the most memorable comebacks by winning the set 7–5 and then the match. In the final against Australia, Krishnan and Jaidip Mukerjea won the doubles rubber (against John Newcombe and Tony Roche), but Krishnan lost both singles matches (against Fred Stolle and Roy Emerson) as India were defeated 4–1. Krishnan was a regular player on the Indian Davis Cup team between 1953 and 1975, compiling a 69–28 winning record (50–19 in singles and 19–9 in doubles).

== Junior Grand Slam finals ==
=== Singles: 2 (1 win – 1 loss) ===
Result	Year	Championship	Surface	Opponent	Score
Loss	1953	Wimbledon	Grass	(United Kingdom) Billy Knight	5–7, 4–6
Win	1954	Wimbledon	Grass	(Australia) Ashley Cooper	6–2, 7–5

== Style of play ==
Krishnan's playing style was known as "touch tennis". Critics hailed Krishnan as a marvel, Lance Tingay of The Daily Telegraph described his tennis as "pure oriental charm" while another described his style as "Eastern magic". More recently, Robert Philip wrote that "each and every Krishnan rally was a thing of rare beauty". According to veteran sports journalist C.V. Narsimhan, "His service was never a powerful weapon, he did not have any powerful groundstrokes either. He won with consistency, angled volleys, and a graceful half volley drop shot now and then". Rafael Osuna, Nicola Pietrangeli and Krishnan's son Ramesh were some of the other notable exponents of this style, emphasizing finesse.

== Awards ==
Krishnan received the Arjuna award in 1961, the Padma Shri in 1962 and the Padma Bhushan in 1967 from the Government of India. He received the Helms World Trophy for Asia in 1966 and the Lifetime Achievement award by the Asian Sports Press Union at Kuala Lumpur in 2007.

== Book ==
Krishnan has written, with his son Ramesh Krishnan and Nirmal Shekar, a book titled A touch of tennis: The story of a tennis family. The book covering the achievements of three generations of tennis-playing Krishnans, was released by Penguin Books India.

== Current ==
Krishnan now lives in Chennai, where he manages a gas distribution agency. Ramesh Krishnan emulated his father's achievement of winning the Wimbledon junior title, and went on to become a leading Indian tennis player in the 1980s. On 25 July 2012, Ramanathan Krishnan re-launched India's premier English-language weekly sports magazine, Sportstar, at a function in Chennai. Krishnan runs a tennis training center in Chennai together with his son.

== Career highlights ==
- 1954 – Wimbledon – junior champion
- 1958 – Northern Championships champion – won close match over Laver
- 1959 – Queen's Club Championships champion – defeated Olmedo and Fraser
- 1959 – U.S. Hard Court Championships champion – defeated Reed and Mulloy
- 1959 – Pacific Southwest Championships runner-up- defeated Laver and lost final to Emerson
- 1960 – Wimbledon – seeded seventh, defeated Gimeno and reached the semi-finals (losing to eventual champion Neale Fraser)
- 1961 – Wimbledon – seeded seventh, defeated Emerson and reached the semi-finals for the second consecutive time (losing to eventual champion Rod Laver)
- 1963 – Antwerp International champion – defeated Pietrangeli in four set final
- 1965 – River Oaks International Tennis Championships champion – defeated Osuna, Emerson in four sets, and Richey in four sets
- 1966 – member of the Indian team which reached the final of the Davis Cup (lost to Australia in the final)
- 1967 – Antwerp International champion – defeated Emerson in final in three straight sets
- 1968 – Canadian Open champion – defeated Torben Ulrich in final

== Grand Slam tournament performance timeline ==
Key
W	F	SF	QF	#R	RR	Q#	DNQ	A	NH

(W) winner; (F) finalist; (SF) semifinalist; (QF) quarterfinalist; (#R) rounds 4, 3, 2, 1; (RR) round-robin stage; (Q#) qualification round; (DNQ) did not qualify; (A) absent; (NH) not held; (SR) strike rate (events won / competed); (W–L) win–loss record.

=== Singles ===
Tournament	1953	1954	1955	1956	1957	1958	1959	1960	1961	1962	1963	1964	1965	1966	1967	1968	SR
French Open	A	1R	A	A	3R	2R	A	A	A	QF	A	A	4R	A	3R	1R	0 / 7
Wimbledon	1R	3R	3R	3R	2R	4R	3R	SF	SF	3R	4R	A	3R	A	1R	1R	0 / 14
US Open	A	A	A	A	3R	A	3R	A	A	A	A	A	A	A	A	2R	0 / 3
Win–loss	0–1	2–2	2–1	2–1	5–3	4–2	4–2	5–1	5–1	6–0	3–0	0–0	5–2	0–0	2–2	1–3	0 / 24

=== Doubles ===
Tournament	1954	1955	1956	1957	1958	1959	1960	1961	1962	1963	1964	1965	1966	1967	1968
Wimbledon	1R	QF	3R	2R	QF	QF	1R	QF	2R	2R	A	QF	A	QF	1R
