= USSR Championship =

- Soviet Championship (disambiguation), various meanings
- Soviet Hockey League, top league of Soviet hockey
- Soviet Top League, football competition
- USSR Chess Championship, chess competition
- USSR Championships (tennis), a closed national tennis competition 1924 to 1991 also called the Soviet Championships
- USSR International Championships, an open (to foreign players) tennis competition 1957 to 1975 also called the Soviet International Championships
