= Russian Cup (tennis) =

- Awarded for: Outstanding sports contributions to tennis
- Country: Russia
- Presented by: Russian Tennis Federation
- First award: 1994
- Website: ruscup.ru

The Russian Cup (Russian: Русский Кубок; pronounced [ˈruskʲɪj ˈkubək]) is an annual major national Russian sports award given to tennis players, coaches, companies and other organizations and people that contributed to the development of this sport in Russia. The cup was established in 1994 by then-Vice President of the Russian Tennis Federation Dmitry Vikharev and the President of IC Arman. It was organized by Anatoly Gusev in the following two years, and after his death in 1996 his wife Lyudmila Guseva and businessman Alexander Cherkasov continued its organization.

Since 1998, the committee includes such major tennis people as President of the RTF Shamil Tarpishchev. In 1998 the place for the ceremony was relocated from the Cinema Centre "Solovey" on the Krasnaya Presna to the Radisson Slavyanskaya Hotel. Only once, in 2003, was the award presented in the Cinema House in Moscow. The awardee receives a statue illustrating the Russian two-headed eagle, which was created by designer Igor Kamenev. It can't be bought although it exists in the catalog of its supplier. The Kremlin Cup was named top tournament nine times, once as the organizer of the professional and the junior events.

== Awardees ==
=== 1994 ===
- Male Player of the Year – Yevgeny Kafelnikov
- Female Player of the Year – Elena Makarova
- Doubles Player of the Year – Andrei Olhovskiy
- Coach of the Year – A. Lepeshin
- Youth Coach of the Year – N. Rogova
- Favourite Publication – Теннис+
- Best Sports Base – Luzhniki
- Best Foreign Businessman – Sason Kakschuri (Switzerland)
- Best Individual Contribution – Shamil Tarpishchev
- Best Foreign Contribution – VOLKL Pro-Kennex
- "Big Hat" – E. Panteleyev, V. Alyoshin
- Best Regional Federation – St. Petersburg

=== 1995 ===
- Male Player of the Year – Yevgeny Kafelnikov
- Female Player of the Year – Elena Makarova
- Triumph of the Year – Andrei Chesnokov
- Coach of the Year – A. Lepeshin
- Youth Coach of the Year – L. Preobrazhenskaya
- Tournament of the Year – Samara Ladies Open
- Best Sports Base – Olympic Stadium
- Best Individual Contribution – O. Soskovets
- Best Foreign Contribution – ITALTEL
- "Big Hat" – A. Korzhakov, G. Melikyan
- Best National Sponsor – Trans WorldMetals
- Best Contribution of a City – Moscow
- Favourite Youth Sports School – Spartak

=== 1996 ===
- Male Player of the Year – Yevgeny Kafelnikov
- Female Player of the Year – Elena Likhovtseva
- Triumph of the Year – Anna Kournikova
- Coach of the Year – A. Lepeshin
- Youth Coach of the Year – L. Preobrazhenskaya
- Tournament of the Year – St. Petersburg Open
- Best Sports Base – Kristal-Avangard
- Best Individual Contribution – Yuri Luzhkov
- "Big Hat" – A. Gusev, V. Ilyushin
- Best Contribution of a City – Sochi
- Favourite Youth Sports School – Saratov

=== 1997 ===
- Male Player of the Year – Yevgeny. Kafelnikov
- Female Player of the Year – Anna Kournikova
- Triumph of the Year – Alexander Volkov
- Newcomer of the Year – Lina Krasnoroutskaya
- Surprise of the Year – Girls Under-16: E. Dementieva, A. Myskina, G. Fatakhetdinova; captain and coach K. Bogorodetsky; Girls Under-14: E. Bovina, L. Krasnoroutskaya, G. Fokina; captain R. Zabirov
- Coach of the Year – K. Bogorodetsky
- Tournament of the Year – Women's Kremlin Cup
- Best Foreign Businessman – Y. Scott (USA)
- Best Individual Contribution – Y. Luzhkov
- "Big Hat" – V. Yumashev, S. Yastrzhembsky
- Best Developed City for Tennis – Samara Oblast, Governor K. A. Titov
- Contribution of the Year – A. E. Krupnov, head of an informatics GOC; V. S. Lagutin, Director of Moscow City Telephone Network; V. L. Rozhdestvensky, President of Glavmosstroy; N. I. Karpov, head of the administration of Sochi
- Favourite Sports Commentator – E. Fedyakov
- Best Individual Contribution to Senior Tennis – S. Mirza
- Best Contribution to Handicapped Sport – L. Shevchik
- Best Contribution to Science – A. Skorodumova

=== 1998 ===
- Male Player of the Year – Yevgeny Kafelnikov
- Female Player of the Year – Anna Kournikova
- Triumph of the Year – Marat Safin
- Newcomer of the Year – Nadezhda Petrova
- Tournament of the Year – Kremlin Cup
- Youth Coach of the Year – P. Islanova
- Best Sports Base – Shiryaevo Pole, Olympic Stadium
- Best Contribution to Tennis Science – Cathedra of Tennis RGAFK S. P. Belits-Geyman
- "Big Hat" – Y. Luzhkov, E. Panteleev
- Best Contribution of a City – Moscow
- Favourite Youth Sports School – CSKA Moscow
- Best Developed City for Tennis – Kaluga Oblast, Obninsk
- Best Contribution to Team Tennis – Tatiana Panova
- Best Mass Media Project – Радио-Спорт
- Best National Sponsor – Rostelekom

=== 1999 ===
- Male Player of the Year – Yevgeny Kafelnikov
- Triumph of the Year – Lina Krasnoroutskaya
- Coach of the Year – K. Bogorodetsky
- Youth Coach of the Year – Family Krasnoroutsky
- Female Team of the Year – E. Likhovtseva, T. Panova, E. Dementieva, E. Makarova; coaches K. Bogorodetsky, Dmitry Dyagterev
- Girls Under-18 Team of the Year – E. Dementieva, A. Myskina, O. Mikhaylova; coach K. Bogorodetsky
- Success of the Year – Girls Under-14: R. Islanova, A. Bastrikova, N. Bratchikova, D. Safina
- Tournament of the Year – Kremlin Cup
- Best Contribution to the Theory of Tennis Science – V. Golenko
- Best Foreign Sponsor – Mobitel
- Best Contribution of a City – Moscow
- Best Contribution to the Development of Tennis Practigues and Methods – V. Yanchuk
- "Big Hat" – C. Calmy, D. Perminov
- Best Tennis Publication – Tennis Encyclopedia by B. Fomenko
- Journalist of the Year – O. Spassky
- Best Individual Contribution – Y. Kalagursky
- Best Sports Base – Sport Complex "Zhivopisny"
- Best Regional Tennis Club – Tolyatti Tennis Centre
- Best Youth Tennis Club – Spartak
- Best National Sponsor – Plaza

=== 2000 ===
- Male Player of the Century – Yevgeny Kafelnikov
- Female Player of the Century – Olga Morozova
- Progress of the Year – Elena Dementieva
- Triumph of the Year – Marat Safin
- Team of the Year – Under-14 girls: D. Chermarda, I. Kotkina, V. Dushevina; coach E. Manyukov
- Team of the Year – Under-14 boys: A. Sitak, S. Matsukevich, N. Solovyev; coach V. Gorelov
- Coach of the Year – R. Islanova
- Tournament of the Century – Kremlin Cup
- Best Contribution of a City – Moscow
- Best Individual Contribution – O. Kornblit
- "Big Hat" – V. Sokolov, A. Ivanchenko
- Best Developed City for Tennis – Khanty-Mansi Autonomous Okrug, Surgut
- Best Contribution to Popularization of Tennis – Anna Dmitrieva
- Sponsor of the Year – Siberian Aluminium
- Best Individual Contribution – Shamil Tarpishchev
- Best Tennis Project – Tennis Academy "Valeri"

=== 2001 ===
- Male Player of the Year – Yevgeny Kafelnikov
- Female Player of the Year – Elena Dementieva
- Newcomer of the Year – Svetlana Kuznetsova
- Team of the Year – E. Dementieva, N. Petrova, L. Krasnoroutskaya, E. Likhovtseva, E. Bovina, captain S. Tarpishchev; coach L. Neiland
- Amateur Player of the Year – Aleksandr Sharapov
- Amateur Team of the Year – CASA-International: V. Sokolov, A. Sharapov, R. Gamov, C. Askerov
- Tournament of the Century – Kremlin Cup
- Best Contribution of Popularization of Tennis – Valerya Titova
- Best Contribution to Tennis Science – Igor Vsevolodov
- Best Individual Contribution, Development of Tennis in Siberia – Sergey Sobyanin
- Best Individual Contribution, Development of Tennis in Mordovia – Nikolay Merkushkin
- Best Individual Contribution and Development of Tennis – Anatoly Oplanchuk
- Best Individual Contribution and Development of Tennis – Yuri Laptev
- Best Contribution of a City – Moscow
- Best Individual Contribution to Regional Tennis – Vladimir Gusev
- Best Tennis Publication – 40:30
- "Big Hat" – M. Dunayevsky, A. Redko
- Partners of the Year – Rusal, Bank of Moscow
- Best Tennis School – Luzhniki

=== 2002 ===
- Success of the Year – E. Bovina, S. Kuznetsova, D. Safina, A. Myskina
- Success of the Year in Doubles – E. Likhovtseva, E. Dementieva
- Progress of the Year – V. Dushevina, M. Kirilenko
- Team of the Year – E. Kafelnikov, M. Safin, M. Youzhny, S. Leonyuk, B. Sobkin, A. Cherkasov, V. Okhapkin, S. Yasnitsky, A. Glebov
- Amateur of the Year – Aleksandr Sharapov
- Amateurs of the Year – Team Rossgosstrakh: E. Arkusha, A. Sanguliya, R. Sarkisov
- Tournament of the Year – Mordovia Cup (ATP Futures)
- Best Contribution of Secure Tennis – Evgeny Gulinsky
- Best Multiannual Contribution to the Preparation of Tennis Picture Frames – Tatyana Ivanova
- Best Contribution to Professional Tennis in Russia – Vladimir Bakulev
- Project of the Year – Vladimir Lazarev
- Best Contribution to Amateur Tennis – Viktor Pavlov
- Best Outside Perspective – Leonid Zinkevich
- Best Contribution to Regional Tennis Programs – Sibnefteprovod
- Best Contribution of a City – Moscow
- Best Contribution of Tennis Base and to the Win of Team Russia at the Davis Cup – Luzhniki
- Best Individual Contribution – Boris Yeltsin
- Best Tennis Publication – Nikolay Mikhaylov
- Partners of the Year – Bank of Moscow, Ingosstrakh
- "Big Hat" – A. Braverman, D. Belov

=== 2003 ===
- Male Player of the Year – Nikolay Davydenko
- Female Tennis Player of the Year – Anastasia Myskina
- Newcomer of the Year – Maria Sharapova
- Best Tennis Courage – Club Ikar: V. Demenko, N. Korzenev, A. Fedotov, N. Bakhmatova, L. Bubnova, A. Fokin, M. Sarychev
- Amateurs of the Year – Women's Singles: E. Baykova; Men's Singles: A. Sharapov; Men's Doubles: A. Sharapov, C. Askerov; Tournament: Cupper Cup, St. Petersburg
- Coach of the Year – Oksana Rodina
- Tournament of the Year – Governor Cup of the Moscow Oblast
- Best Tennis Club – Balashikha
- Recognition in Russia – Francesco Ricci Bitti
- Best Contribution to Tennis Base – Concept-90, Davor Sharin
- Best Contribution to the Organization of Tennis Tournaments – Vladimir Tolkatsir
- Best Partner of the Russian Tennis Federation – R. Safin, S. Tarpishchev
- Best Alliance in Arts and Tennis – N. Karachentsev, People's Artist of Russia, organizer of the Russian Cup; A. Cherkasov, producer of the Russian Cup, head of the Board of Directors of Sadko-Arkada
- Umpire of the Year – Dmitry Maksimov
- Featured Picture of the Year – V. Evtushenko, A. Golutva, A. Mikhaylov: Break Point

=== 2004 ===
- Male Player of the Year – Marat Safin
- Team of the Year – Russia Fed Cup team: A. Myskina, S. Kuznetsova, V. Zvonareva, E. Likhovtseva; captain Shamil Tarpishchev; coaches L. Savchenko-Neiland and D. Degtyarev; physicians D. Sharipov and S. Yasnitsky; masseur A. Glebov
- Success of the Year in Doubles – Nadezhda Petrova
- Amateurs of the Year – Women's Singles – O. Boytenko; Men's Singles – V. Olkov; Men's Doubles – A. Sharapov, C. Askerov
- Coach of the Year – Boris Sobkin
- Youth Coach of the Year – Yuri Yudkin
- Legend – Alexander Metreveli
- Honour – Nina Teplyakova
- Tennis Hospitality – Guram Mzhavanadze
- Tournament of the Year – Kremlin Cup (youth)
- Journalist of the Year – Aleksandr Darakhvelidze
- Best Contribution to Tennis – Lev Agayan
- Best Contribution to the Organization of Tennis Tournaments – Vladimir Kamelson
- Best Regional Tennis Federation – Ruben Amaryan, President of RTF in the Moscow Oblast
- Best Regional Tennis Club – "Dinastiya", Saint Petersburg

=== 2005 ===
- Male Player of the Year – Nikolay Davydenko
- Female Player of the Year – Maria Sharapova
- Team of the Year – Fed Cup team: A. Myskina, E. Dementieva, V. Dushevina, D. Safina; captain S. Tarpishchev; coaches A. Volkov, L. Savchenko and M. Mosyakova; physician S. Yasnitsky; masseur D. Sharipov
- Coach of the Year – Eduard Davydenko
- Youth Coach of the Year – Viktor Pavlov
- Girls Under-18 Team of the Year – A. Kudryavtseva, Y. Shvedova, E. Makarova; captain E. Manyukov
- Girls Under-14 Team of the Year – A. Pavluychenkova, E. Kulikova, M. Sirotkina; captain A. Sikanov
- Journalist of the Year – Andrey Novikov
- Best Tennis Publication – Tennis & Business (Теннис и бизнес)
- Best National Sponsors – "Rostransmash", Yuri Laptev
- Best Sponsors – FENIKS, NIKE
- Best Contribution of Tennis Base – LLC "TKSSSTROY", Konstantin Kuleshov
- Tennis Mums – V. Dementieva, G. Myskina, R. Islanova

=== 2006 ===
- Male Player of the Year – Nikolay Davydenko
- Female Player of the Year – Maria Sharapova (i.a.)
- Progress of the Year – Anastasia Pavlyuchenkova
- Team of the Year – Under-14 Youth: A. Khacharyan, R. Muyaev, A. Rumyantsev; coaches: M. Kashuba, A. Kalivod
- Coach of the Year – Eduard Davydenko
- Match of the Year – Dmitry Tursunov
- Tennis Longevity – Georgy Safirov
- Best Contribution to Tennis – A. Bokarev, head of board of directors of "Kuzbassrazrezugol"
- Best Contribution to Amateur Tennis – Y. Luzhkov, E. Panteleev
- Best Contribution of Popularization of Tennis – НТВ+ Теннис
- Best Contribution of Regional Tennis – Governor of the Penza Oblast V. Bochkarev
- Best Contribution to Tennis Science – RuKort
- Best Contribution to Tennis Justice – Valery Lutkov
- Best Contribution to Tennis Education – V. Golenko, A. Skorodumova, S. Tarpishchev

=== 2007 ===
- Male Player of the Year – Igor Andreev
- Female Player of the Year – Anna Chakvetadze
- Team of the Year – S. Kuznetsova, A. Chakvedatze, N. Petrova, E. Vesnina, A. Kudryavtseva; assistants: S. Tarpishchev, A. Volkov, A. Zlatoustov, A. Glebov, S. Yasnitsky, D. Sharipov, L. Savchenko
- Doubles Player of the Year – Dinara Safina
- Mixed Doubles Team of the Year – Dmitry Tursunov, Nadezhda Petrova
- Youth Under-14 Boys Team of the Year – A. Volkov, M. Baks, E. Karlovsky; captain M. Kashuba
- Youth Under-12 Girls Team of the Year – Y. Putintseva, I. Khromacheva, M. Aleksandrova
- Amateur Players of the Year – L. Smelyansky, A. Balashova, D. Chepelev, M. Eydlen, D. Maslov, E. Traychun, E. Danilchenko
- Coach of the Year – Viktor Pavlov
- Best Tennis Base – Youth Tennis Academy of Vsevolod
- Best Contribution to Tennis – Yelzin Fund
- Best Contribution to Regional Tennis – Moscow
- Partner of the Federation – Andrey Bokarev

=== 2008 ===
- Male Player of the Year – Nikolay Davydenko
- Breakthrough of the Year – Dinara Safina
- Triumph of the Year – Elena Dementieva
- Team of the Year – Fed Cup team: M. Sharapova, S. Kuznetsova, A. Chakvedatze, D. Safina, V. Zvonareva, E. Makarova, E. Vesnina; assistants: S. Tarpishchev, L. Savchenko, S. Yasnitsky, A. Glebov, D. Sharipov, A. Zlatoustov
- Best Training for the Davis Cup team – Commander-in-Chief of the Internal Troops of the Ministry of Internal Affairs of Russia, General N. Rogozhin
- Youth Under-16 Boys Team of the Year – M. Biryukov, R. Muzaev, A. Koshtanov; captain V. Gorelov
- Youth Under-18 Girls Team of the Year – A. Pivovarova, K. Pervak, K. Lykina; coach Yevgeniya Manyukova
- Coach of the Year – Rauza Islanova
- Tournament of the Year – Kremlin Cup (pro), Kremlin Cup (youth)
- Journalist of the Year – Dmitry Grantsev
- Best Tennis Base – Centre of Tennis Education in Khanty-Mansiysk
- Amateur Tournament Series of the Year – 'Amatur'
- Best Contribution to Regional Tennis – Anatoly Pushkov, mayor of Tolyatti; Moscow

=== 2009 ===
- Best Contribution to Russian and World Tennis – Marat Safin
- Breakthrough of the Year – Dinara Safina
- Newcomer of the Year – Andrey Kuznetsov
- Team of the Year – Team Russia at the Universiade in Belgrade: E. Makarova, K. Lykina, V. Diatchenko, E. Donskoy, T. Ivanova, L. Ivanov
- Youth Under-16 Girls Team of the Year – K. Kirillova, D. Gavrilova, P. Leykina, O. Rodina
- Amateurs of the Year – 'Amatur'
- Best Tennis Base – 'Tennis-Siti' of Almyetevsk
- Best Contribution to National Tennis – Russian Tennis Tour
- Best Assistance to Russian Tennis and Sports – Aleksey Kulakovsky
- Best Regional Tennis Federation – TF Moscow Oblast
- Best Contribution to Tennis Science – Olga Zhikhareva
- Best Contribution to TV Journalism – Aleksandr Metreveli
- Ambassador of Free Will of Tennis – Konstantin Zatulin
- Most Tennis Parlament – Y. Borisovets, A. Gubkin, O. Arzhbe, D. Sablin, S. Neverov, S. Smetanyuk, K. Zatulin, O. Kovalev; captain I. Gimaletdinov

=== 2010 ===
- Best Contribution to Russian and World Tennis – Elena Dementieva
- Male Player of the Year – Mikhail Youzhny
- Female Player of the Year – Vera Zvonareva
- Breakthrough of the Year – Daria Gavrilova
- Youth Under-16 Girls Team of the Year – O. Rodina, V. Kan, D. Gavrilova, M. Gasparyan
- Youth Under-14 Girls Team of the Year – K. Sharipova, P. Yuzefovich, U. Ayzatulina
- Youth Under-16 Dream Team of the Year – M. Biryukov, A. Rumyantsev, V. Baluda, R. Muzaev
- Coach of the Year – Aleksandr Kuznetsov
- Youth Coach of the Year – Evgeniya Kryuchkova
- Tournament of the Year – Moscow Championships
- Best Tennis Base – Kazan Tennis Center
- Journalist of the Year – Vyacheslav Shorikov
- Best Contribution to Tennis – Aleksandr Ponomarenko, Ivan Shabalov, Yaroslav Kalagursky
- Best Tennis Counsel – Vladimir Solntsev

=== 2011 ===
- Hero of the Year – Mikhail Youzhny
- Team of the Year – Girls Under-14: A. Rychagova, A. Komardina, V. Kudermetova, D. Kasatkina; coaches V. Fadeev, E. Makarova
- Debuts of the Year – I. Bulykina, L. Nanava, G. Fattakhetdinova
- Junior of the Year – Aslan Karatsev
- Amateur Players of the Year – A. Prokofieva, E. Chausova, O. Smirnova, A. Chuzharov, V. Voloshin, V. Zhvanko, D. Budanov, A. Burnashov
- Coach for the Year – Mikhail Sarychev
- Umpire of the Year – Andrey Zimin
- Tournament of the Year – Youth European Championships
- Journalist of the Year – Aleksandr Zilbert
- Businessman of the Year – Aleksandr Brilyantshchikov
- Tennis City – Moscow
- Best Contribution to Tennis – Tatarstan
- Best Contribution to Youth Tennis – Andrey Babaev
- Best Contribution to Tennis Science – Galina Ivanova

=== 2012 ===
- Female Players of the Year – M. Sharapova, M. Kirilenko, N. Petrova, E. Makarova
- Team of the Year – Girls Under-16: O. Rodina, E. Kulichkova, D. Kasatkina, A. Silich
- Breakthrough of the Year – Irina Bulykina, Aleksey Kravtsov
- Senior Player of the Year – Mikhail Novik
- Amateur Players of the Year – (45+): V. Kotovshchikov; (45-): E. Borisov; Men's Doubles: I. Rubinchik, E. Traychun; Mixed: A. Shoshev, Y. Vorobyeva
- Coach of the Year – Evgeniya Manyukova
- Tournaments of the Year – Moscow Championships, Ozerov Cup, Mordovia Cup
- Best Tennis Federation – TF Penza Oblast
- Best Contribution to Tennis – Vladimir Lazarev
- Best Contribution to Kids Tennis – International Tennis Academy in Khimki
- Best Tennis Base – Novokuznetsk Tennis Academy
- Best Tennis Region – Samara Oblast
- Best Contribution to Tennis Science – Vadim Gushchin
- Best Tennis Physician – Sergey Yasnitsky
- Partner of the Year – Babolat
- Best Tennis Counsel – Yuri Utin

=== 2013 ===
- Female Player of the Year – Polina Shakirova (wheelchair, born 26.01.1995)
- Pair of the Year – Elena Vesnina and Ekaterina Makarova
- Team of the Year – Girls Under-16: V. Kudermetova, D. Kasatkina, A. Pospelova; captain O. Mishukova; Boys Under-16: A. Rublev, R. Safiulin, E. Tyurnev; captain I. Pridankin; Boys Under-14: A. Dubrivny, F. Klimov, D. Voronin, A. Avidzba; captain A. Deripasko
- Junior of the Year – Karen Khachanov
- Comeback of the Year – Alisa Kleybanova
- Best Contribution to Tennis – Igor Andreev, Anna Chakvetadze
- Team of the Youth – S. Tarpishchev, A. Metreveli, V. Egorov, V. Korotkov, A. Volkov, S. Likhachev
- Amateur Players of the Year – E. Traychun, E. Borisov, E. Sventitskaya, L. Feklyunina
- Best Individual Contribution to Youth Tennis – Aleksandr Ostrovsky
- Best Contribution to Regional Tennis – 'Nasledie' Fund
- Best Contribution to Tennis Infrastructure – Concept 90
- Most Trustworthy Partner – Bank of Moscow
- Best International Partner – Samsung
- Best Technical Partner – Land Rover
- Most Devouted Fan – Naina Yeltsina

=== 2014 ===
- Legend – Natalya Vetoshnikova
- Team of the Year – Wheelchair Team: I. Shaykhislamov, A. Saitgareev, V. Lvov; coaches O. Murina, S. Muldagaliev
- Pair of the Year – Elena Vesnina and Ekaterina Makarova
- Juniors of the Year – Andrey Rublev, Darya Kasatkina
- Tournament of the Year – Kremlin Cup
- Tennis Eye – Robert Maksimov
- Journalist of the Year – Natalya Bykanova
- Best Contribution to Tennis – Nikolay Davydenko

=== 2015 ===
- Teams of the Year – Fed Cup team; Russia Girls Under-18 team; Russia Girls Under-16 team; Russia Girls Under-14 team; Russia Boys Under-14 team
- Juniors of the Year – Roman Safiulin and Sofya Zhuk
- Tournament of the Year – Governor Cup, Astrakhan Oblast
- Tournament and Team of the Year – Team Championships in Beach Tennis and Russia Beach Tennis team
- Best Contribution to Tennis – Vladimir Dmitriev
- Best Contribution to the Victory in Tennis – Primorsky Krai
- Best Contribution to World Tennis – Francesco Ricci Bitti
- Best Contribution to Regional Tennis – Ryazan Oblast
- Best Contribution to the Development of Tennis – Vitaly Mutko; Naina Yeltsina

=== 2016 ===
- Female Player of the Year – Svetlana Kuznetsova, Viktoriia Lvova (wheelchair, born 01.10.1998)
- Juniors of the Year – Avelina Sayfetdinova and Daniella Medvedeva
- Pair of the Year – Elena Vesnina and Ekaterina Makarova
- Teams of the Year – Russia Girls Under-19 team (Elena Rybakina, Amina Anshba, Anastasia Gasanova; coach Elena Makarova); Russia Girls Under-17 team (Olesya Pervushina, Anastasia Potapova, Taisia Pachkaleva, Varvara Gracheva; coach Oksana Mishukova); Russia Boys Under-17 team (Alen Avidzba, Timofey Skatov, Alexey Zakharov, Egor Noskin; coach Artem Deripaska); Beach Tennis team (Darya Churakova, Irina Glimakova, Yulia Chubarova, Nikita Burmakin, Ivan Syrov, Sergey Kuptsov; coach Stanislav Zaychenko
- Coach of the Year – Shamil Tarpishchev
- Tournament of the Year – Megafon Dream Cup (wheelchair), Kazan World Gran Prix (beach tennis)
- Best Contribution to the Tennis Infrastructure – Alexey Alexandrov (Western Okrug)
- Best Contribution to the Development of Tennis – Yakov Shakhtin (VTB Kremlin Cup)

=== 2017 ===
- "Golden Duo" – Elena Vesnina and Ekaterina Makarova
- Team of the Year –
  - Darya Frayman, Kamila Rakhimova, Anastasia Tikhonova; captain Oksana Mishukova
  - Elena Rybakina, Sofya Lansere, Anastasia Kharitonova; captain Elena Makarova
- Juniors of the Year – Timofey Skatov, Oksana Selekhmetyeva, Maria Timofeyeva, Diana Shnayder
- Juniors of the Year (wheelchair) – Sergey Lysov and Alexey Shuklin
- Success of the Year – Lyudmila Nikoyan and Nikolay Guryev, Ekaterina Kamenetskaya and Veronika Pershina, Ekaterina Glazkova and Anna Romanova, Agniya Bogatova and Darya Kalichinina (beach tennis)
- Coaches of Champions – Evgenina Manyukova and Sergey Vesnin
- General of the Year – Yakov Shatkhin, vice-president and general secretary of the RTF (Russian Tennis Federation)
- Journalist of the Year – Daniil Salnikov, editor of the Tennis section of the site Championat.com
- Best Contribution to Popularization of Tennis – international children's camp "Artek"
- Best Contribution to Children's Tennis – Tatyana Zinina, director of the Adler Tennis Academy
- Best Contribution to Regional Tennis – Aleksandr Kosarev, merited president of the Samara Tennis Federation
- Partner of the Year – VTB Bank
- In Memory – Igor Volk, former president of the All-Union Tennis Federation

=== 2018 ===
- Male Player of the Year – Karen Khachanov
- Contribution to Justice in Tennis – Anatoly Maksimov
- Team of the Year (under-19, wheelchair) – Sergey Lysov, Leonid Gubanov, Vadim Obukhov, Olga Murina, Serik Muldagaliev
- Team of the Year (under-17) – Oksana Selekhmetyeva, Alina Charayeva, Elina Avanesyan, Oksana Mishukova
- Team of the Year (under-15) – Diana Shnayder, Erika Andreyeva, Nadezhda Khalturina, Aleksandr Krasnorutsky
- Junior of the Year – Konstantin Zhzhenov
- For the Contribution to Regional Tennis – Vladimir Gusev
- Success of the Year (beach tennis) – Ekaterina Glazkova, Anna Romanova
- For the Long-Term Representation of Russia in ITF – Roman Murashkovsky
- For the Contribution to Russian and International Tennis – Mikhail Youzhny
- Once-For-All-Time Coach – Boris Sobkin
- For the Contribution to Worldwide Sports and Tennis – Shamil Tarpishchev

=== 2019 ===
- Legend – Alexander Metreveli
- Male Player of the Year – Daniil Medvedev
- Student Tennis Players of the Year – Ivan Gakhov, Yana Sizikova
- Team of the Year – Andrey Rublev, Karen Khachanov, Daniil Medvedev, Evgeny Donskoy, Shamil Tarpishchev (Davis Cup team)
- Team of the Year (under-15) – Anastasia Guryeva, Elena Pridankina, Yaroslava Bartashevich, Aleksandr Krasnorutsky
- Team of the Year (under-16) – Aristarkh Safonov, Igor Kudryashov, Robert Korelov, Yevgeny Savchenko
- Team of the Year (under-17) – Polina Kudermetova, Oksana Selekhmetyeva, Diana Shnayder, Oksana Mishukova
- Junior of the Year – Polina Kudermetova
- Tennis Eye – Aleksandr Bondarev
- For the Contribution to Children's Tennis and for the Support of Professional Tennis – tennis school "Zhemchuzhina", headed by Yulia Fursova
- Success of the Year (beach tennis) – Arina Kosenkova, Anastasia Semenova (under-15); Elizaveta Tkachenko, Daniil Pokidin (under-15, mixed doubles); Ekaterina Glazkova, Veronika Pershina (under-19); Ekaterina Glazkova, Vasily Reutov (under-19, mixed)
- Team of the Year (beach tennis) – Nikita Burmakin, Sergey Kuptsov
- Best Tennis Club – "Balashikha"

=== 2020 ===
The ceremony was postponed to 2021 due to a lack of tournaments held because of the COVID-19 pandemic.

=== 2021 ===
The offline ceremony wasn't held due to the COVID-19 pandemic in Russia but the awards were presented through a documentary (online ceremony analogue).

- Male Player of the Year — Daniil Medvedev.
- Female Player of the Year — Anastasia Pavlyuchenkova.
- Team of the Year:
  - BJK Cup winners — Igor Andreev (captain), Anastasia Pavlyuchenkova, Liudmila Samsonova, Veronika Kudermetova, Daria Kasatkina, Ekaterina Alexandrova.
  - Davis Cup winners — Shamil Tarpishchev (captain), Daniil Medvedev, Andrey Rublev, Karen Khachanov, Aslan Karatsev, Evgeny Donskoy.
  - Girls (under-15), won the World Championship — Mirra Andreeva, Daria Egorova, Alina Korneeva. Captain - Alexander Krasnorutsky.
  - Girls (under-19), won the European Championship — Diana Shnaider, Polina Kudermetova, Erika Andreeva. Captain - Elena Makarova.
  - Boys (under-17), won the Junior Davis Cup — Maxim Zhukov, Yaroslav Demin, Danil Panarin. Captain - Ivan Pridankin.
- For the contribution to the development of regional tennis — Alexander Verkhovsky (Sakhalin Oblast).
- For the contribution to the victory — Igor Andreev, Igor Kunitsyn, Sergei Demekhine, Anton Zaitsev, Alexander Dolgov, Sergei Yasnitsky, Dmitry Krutikov, Ilya Rappoport, Nikolai Polfuntikov, Ivan Trofimov, Yuri Aseev, Maxim Kozin, Alexander Pavlyuchenkov, Evgeny Alexandrov, Andrei Olhovskiy.
- For the contribution to the development of Russian tennis — Vladimir Gusev.
- Olympians—2020 (pre-games RTF training camp participants) — Karen Khachanov, Andrey Rublev, Aslan Karatsev, Elena Vesnina, Anastasia Pavlyuchenkova, Ekaterina Alexandrova, Veronika Kudermetova.
- Children's Coach — Marina Marenko.
- Triumph of the Year — Nikita Burmakin (beach tennis; won the 2021 ITF Beach Tennis Championships in doubles, with Tommaso Giovannini).
- "Golden Sand" (beach tennis):
  - Girls (under-17), won the World Championship — Angelina Klimuk and Elizaveta Tkachenko.
  - Girls (under-19), won the European Championship — Arina Kosenkova and Anastasia Semenova.
  - Mixed pair, won the World Championship — Elizaveta Tkachenko and Grigory Agafonov.

=== 2022 ===
Ceremony was held during the Moscow river cruise.

- Triumph of the Year — Veronika Kudermetova
- Junior of the Year — Diana Shnaider
- For many years of contribution to the promotion of Russian tennis — Anna Dmitrieva
- For contribution to the preparation of the national teams of Russia — Alexander Bogomolov
- The best children's coach — Evgenia Kulikovskaya
- For long-term achievements in the development of Russian tennis — Tatarstan Tennis Federation
- For contribution to the development of tennis infrastructure in Russia — Sergey Tsivilev
- For contribution to the development of regional tennis — Yuri Gerasimov
- For contribution to the training of coaching staff — Olga Zhikhareva
- The best youth tournament — Tournament named after V. Gulidov
- Juniors of the year (beach tennis): Yuliana Andreeva, Ekaterina Stepanova, Olesya Borodina, Arseniy Tarasov, Diana Izraileva, Anastasia Stepanyuk, Elizaveta Kudinova, Dmitry Pavlov

2023-2024

== Records ==
Total number

- 11 awards — Shamil Tarpishchev (1994, 2000 — Best Individual Contribution; 2002, 2021 — captain of the Team of the Year: Davis Cup; 2001, 2004, 2005, 2007, 2008 — captain of the Team of the Year: Fed Cup; 2003 — (together with Ralif Safin) Partner of the Year; 2006 — Best contribution to the methodology of teaching tennis).
- 10 awards — Elena Dementieva (1997 — Surprise of the Year – Girls Under-16 Team; 1999 — Team of the Year and Girls Under-18 Team of the Year; 2000 — Progress of the Year; 2001 — Female Player of the Year and Team of the Year; 2002 — Success of the Year in Doubles; 2005 — Team of the Year; 2008 — Triumph of the Year; 2010 — Best Contribution to the Russian and World Tennis).
- 9 awards — Yevgeny Kafelnikov (1994—99, 2001 — Male Player of the Year; 2000 — Male Player of the Century; 2002 — Team of the Year: Davis Cup).

Male Tennis Player of the Year

- 7 awards — Yevgeny Kafelnikov (1994—99, 2001)

Female Tennis Player of the Year

- 3 awards — Maria Sharapova (2005—06, 2012)

Youngest

- Irina Khromacheva (12 years, 6 months, 5 days) in 2007.

Oldest

- Georgy Safirov (94 years) in 2006.
