= Moscow International Championships =

Moscow International Championships USSR International Championships

Defunct tennis tournament
- Tour: ILTF World Circuit (1956–72); ILTF Independent Tour (1973–75)
- Founded: 1956; 70 years ago
- Abolished: 1975; 51 years ago
- Location: Moscow, Soviet Union
- Surface: Clay (outdoors)

The Moscow International Championships was a men's and women's open international outdoor tennis tournament founded in 1956. The tournament was organised by the Tennis Federation of the USSR was played on clay courts in Moscow, Soviet Union until 1975.

The event also carried the joint denomination of USSR International Championships. The championships were part ILTF European Circuit a sub circuit of the ILTF World Circuit until 1972 then became part of the ILTF Independent Tour from 1973 until it was discontinued.

== History ==
In the mid-1950s confrontational relations between the Western Bloc and Soviet Union eased in part the Khrushchev Thaw a policy of de-Stalinization by then Soviet leader Nikita Khrushchev, meant that Soviet players were free to travel to overseas international tournaments, while foreign players could take part in a limited number of tournaments within the USSR, mainly in the capital Moscow.

The two prominent international tournaments for foreign players to participate in were the Moscow International Indoor Championships or (USSR International Indoor Championships) usually late winter in February to early spring in March.

The second international tennis event was Moscow International Championships usually staged in the summer at the end of July, beginning of August and was played on clay courts. Additionally two closed tournaments were also held in Moscow for Soviet players only the Moscow Indoor Championships and the Moscow Outdoor Championships.

== Finals ==
=== Men's singles ===
(incomplete roll)

Year	Champions	Runners-up	Score
↓ ILTF World Circuit ↓
1959	(Hungary) Istvan Gulyas	(Poland) Wladyslaw Skonecki	10–8, 9–7, 6–1.
1960	(Hungary) Istvan Gulyas (2)	(Hungary) Zoltán Katona	6–1, 6–3, 6–1.
1961	(Chile) Patricio Rodriguez	(Soviet Union) Toomas Lejus	0–6, 5–7, 6–3, 6–4, 6–4.
1962	(United States) Frank Froehling III	(Australia) John Newcombe	3–6, 6–2, 6–2, 4–6, 7–5.
1963	(Soviet Union) Toomas Lejus	(Soviet Union) Alexander Metreveli	8–6, 6–2, 4–6, 6–2.
1964	(Socialist Federal Republic of Yugoslavia) Niki Pilic	(Socialist Federal Republic of Yugoslavia) Boro Jovanovic	5–7, 5–7, 6–2, 6–4, 6–0.
1965	(Soviet Union) Alexander Metreveli	(Soviet Union) Toomas Lejus	2–6, 6–3, 6–0, 11–9.
1966	(Soviet Union) Alexander Metreveli (2)	(Soviet Union) Vyacheslav Egorov	2–6, 6–2, 6–4, 6–1.
1967	(Soviet Union) Alexander Metreveli (3)	(Soviet Union) Vyacheslav Egorov	6–1, 6–1, 6–2.
1968	(Soviet Union) Toomas Lejus (2)	(Soviet Union) Sergei Likhachev	6–8, 7–5, 6–2, 8–6.
↓ Open era ↓
1969	(Soviet Union) Toomas Lejus (3)	(Soviet Union) Anatoli Volkov	2–6, 6–4, 6–3, 6–2.
1970	(Soviet Union) Alexander Metreveli (4)	(Poland) Wieslaw Gasiorek	6–3, 6–2, 6–2.
1971	(Soviet Union) Alexander Metreveli (5)	(Hungary) Istvan Gulyas	6–4, 6–1, 6–4.
1972	(Soviet Union) Teimuraz Kakuliya	(Soviet Union) Anatoli Volkov	6–3, 6–4
↓ ILTF Independent Tour ↓
1973	(Soviet Union) Alexander Metreveli (6)	(Czechoslovakia) Jan Bedan	6–3, 7–5, 6–4.

=== Women's singles ===
(incomplete roll)

Year	Champions	Runners-up	Score
↓ ILTF World Circuit ↓
1957	(Hungary) Suzy Kormoczy	(Czechoslovakia) Vera Puzejova	2–1 sets
1959	(Soviet Union) Anna Dmitrieva	(Soviet Union) Valeria Kuzmenko	6–3, 6–1
1960	(Soviet Union) Anna Dmitrieva (2)	(Czechoslovakia) Jirina Elgrova	6–3, 6–4
1961	(Czechoslovakia) Vera Sukova	(Soviet Union) Anna Dmitrieva	5–7, 6–1, 6–2
1962	(Australia) Jan Lehane	(Soviet Union) Anna Dmitrieva	6–3, 6–3
1964	(Soviet Union) Anna Dmitrieva (3)	(Soviet Union) Valeria Kuzmenko Titova	6–2, 6–2
1965	(Australia) Margaret Smith	(Soviet Union) Galina Baksheeva	6–2, 6–4
1966	(United Kingdom) Ann Haydon Jones	(Soviet Union) Anna Dmitrieva	6–1, 6–3
1968	(Soviet Union) Olga Morozova	(Soviet Union) Marina Chuvirina	6–1, 6–3
↓ Open era ↓
1969	(United States) Julie Heldman	(United States) Peaches Bartkowicz	6–3, 2–6, 6–3
1970	(Soviet Union) Olga Morozova (2)	(Soviet Union) Tiiu Kivi Parmas	6–4, 6–4
1971	(Soviet Union) A. Yeremeyeva	(Soviet Union) Maria Kull	6–0, 6–3
1972	(Soviet Union) Olga Morozova (3)	(Soviet Union) Marina Kroschina	8–6, 6–2
↓ ILTF Independent Tour ↓
1975	(Soviet Union) Olga Morozova (4)	(Soviet Union) Marina Kroshina	2–6, 7–6, 6–0

== See also ==
- Category:National and multi-national tennis tournaments
