= Moscow International Indoor Championships =

Moscow International Indoor Championships USSR International Indoor Championships

Defunct tennis tournament
- Tour: ILTF World Circuit (1956–72); ILTF Independent Tour (1973–75)
- Founded: 1956; 70 years ago
- Abolished: 1975; 51 years ago
- Location: Moscow, Soviet Union
- Surface: Wood (indoors); Carpet (indoors)

The Moscow International Indoor Championships was a men's and women's open international indoor tennis tournament founded in 1956 as the Moscow International Covered Court Championships. The tournament was organised by the Tennis Federation of the USSR and was played initially on wood courts, switching to carpet courts later in Moscow, Soviet Union until 1975.

The event occasionally carried the joint denomination of USSR International Covered Court Championships or USSR International Indoor Championships. The championships were part ILTF European Circuit a sub circuit of the ILTF World Circuit until 1972 then became part of the ILTF Independent Tour from 1973 until it was discontinued.

== History ==
In the mid-1950s confrontational relations between the Western Bloc and Soviet Union eased in part the Khrushchev Thaw a policy of de-Stalinization by then Soviet leader Nikita Khrushchev, meant that Soviet players were free to travel to overseas international tournaments, while foreign players could take part in a limited number of tournaments within the USSR, mainly in the capital Moscow.

The two prominent international tournaments for foreign players to participate in were the Moscow International Indoor Championships, usually late winter in February to early spring in March. The second international tennis event was Moscow International Championships or (USSR International Championships) usually staged in the summer at the end of July, beginning of August and was played on clay courts. Additionally two closed tournaments were also held in Moscow for Soviet players only the Moscow Indoor Championships and the Moscow Outdoor Championships.

== Finals ==
=== Men's singles ===
(incomplete roll)

Year	Champions	Runners-up	Score
↓ ILTF World Circuit ↓
1956	(Hungary) József Asbóth	(Soviet Union) Sergei Andreev	7-9, 6–4, 6–2.
1957	(Czechoslovakia) Jiri Javorsky	(Soviet Union) Sergei Andreev	6-4, 3–6, 3–6, 6–4, 6–2.
1958	(France) Robert Haillet	(France) Jacques Brichant	6-2, 7–5, 2–6, 6–2.
1960	(France) Gérard Pilet	(West Germany) Wilhelm Bungert	6-1, 6–1, 6–0.
1961	(Soviet Union) Tomas Lejus	(United Kingdom) Alan Mills	6-2, 6–3, 5–7, 7–5.
1962	(Soviet Union) Tomas Lejus (2)	(Italy) Sergio Jacobini	7-5, 8–6, 6–4.
1963	(Soviet Union) Tomas Lejus (3)	(Denmark) Jan Leschly	6-0, 1–6, 6–3, 6–2.
1964	(Soviet Union) Alexander Metreveli	(Soviet Union) Tomas Lejus	7-5, 6–4, 1–6, 2–6, 7–5.
1965	(Soviet Union) Tomas Lejus (4)	(Soviet Union) Alexander Metreveli	6-4, 7–5, 8–6.
1967	(France) Pierre Darmon	(Soviet Union) Alexander Metreveli	4-6, 17–15, 6–2, 2–6, 9–7.
1968	(Soviet Union) Alexander Metreveli (2)	(Soviet Union) Tomas Lejus	6-4, 4–6, 9–7, 6–4.
↓ Open era ↓
1969	(Soviet Union) Tomas Lejus (5)	(Soviet Union) Vladimir Karlovich Palman	6-4, 4–6, 6–4, 6–4.
1971	(Soviet Union) Alexander Metreveli (3)	(Soviet Union) Anatoli Volkov	6-3, 2–6, 6–4, 6–2.
↓ ILTF Independent Tour ↓
1973	(Soviet Union) Teimuraz Kakulia	(Hungary) Balazs Taroczy	5-7, 6–4, 6–3, 6–2.
1974	(Soviet Union) Anatoli Volkov	(Soviet Union) Vladimir Korotkov	6-1, 7–6, 6–7, 7–5.
1975	(Soviet Union) Anatoli Volkov (2)	(Soviet Union) Jewgeni Bobojedow	6-3, 6–1, 4–6, 6–3.

=== Women's singles ===
(incomplete roll)

Year	Champions	Runners-up	Score
↓ ILTF World Circuit ↓
1957	(Czechoslovakia) Vera Puzejova	(Czechoslovakia) Olga Miskova Gazdikova	6-3, 6-1
1958	(Belgium) Christiane Mercelis	(France) Suzanne Schmitt	9-7, 6-0
1959	(Belgium) Christiane Mercelis (2)	(France) Suzanne Schmitt	7-5, 6-2
1960	(Soviet Union) Irina Ryazanova	(France) Aline Nenot	6-4, 7-5
1961	(Soviet Union) Irina Ryazanova (2)	(Italy) Silvana Lazzarino	6-8, 6–4, 6-0
1962	(Soviet Union) Anna Dmitrieva	(Italy) Lea Pericoli	6-2, 7-5
1963	(Soviet Union) Anna Dmitrieva (2)	?	RR event
1964	(Soviet Union) Anna Dmitrieva (3)	(Soviet Union) Valeria Kuzmenko Titova	8-6, 6-2
1965	(West Germany) Helga Schultze	(Soviet Union) Tiiu Kivi	2-6, 8–6, 6-3
1966	(Soviet Union) Galina Baksheeva	(Soviet Union) Maria Kull	6-0, 6–8, 7-5
1967	(Soviet Union) Anna Dmitrieva (4)	(Soviet Union) Galina Baksheeva	9-7, 6-4
1968	(United Kingdom) Virginia Wade	(Soviet Union) Galina Baksheeva	6-1, 6–8, 6-4
↓ Open era ↓
1969	(Soviet Union) Olga Morozova	(Netherlands) Betty Stöve	6-2, 6-2
1970	(West Germany) Helga Niessen	(Soviet Union) Olga Morozova	7-5, 2–6, 6-3
1971	(Soviet Union) Olga Morozova (2)	(Soviet Union) Maria Kull	6-1, 7-5
1972	(Soviet Union) Evgenia Biryukova	(Soviet Union) Anna Dmitrieva	6-4, 6-3
↓ ILTF Independent Tour ↓
1973	(Soviet Union) Olga Morozova (3)	Galina Baksheeva	6-2, 6-3
1974	(Soviet Union) Olga Morozova (4)	(Soviet Union) Marina Kroshina	6-3, 6-1
