= USSR Championships (tennis) =

Soviet Championships U.S.S.R. Championships

Defunct tennis tournament
- Tour: ILTF World Circuit (1924–70); ILTF Independent Tour (1971–91)
- Founded: 1924; 102 years ago
- Abolished: 1991; 35 years ago
- Location: Various
- Venue: Various
- Surface: Clay; Hard

The U.S.S.R. Championships also known as the U.S.S.R. National Championships, or Soviet Championships was a men's and women's closed outdoor clay court, then later hard court tennis tournament founded in 1924 as the Soviet Union Championships. It was organised by the Tennis Federation of the USSR until 1991 when it was discontinued.

== History ==
In 1907 the All-Russia Union of Lawn Tennis Clubs was founded, and its first chairman was Arthur Davidovich Macpherson (1870–1919) a Russian Sports organiser of Scottish Ancestry. In 1908 the association numbered 48 member clubs. The first Russian Lawn Tennis Championships (also called the Russian Championships) were held in 1907 and was played on clay courts, women's events were not staged until 1909 and the event was closed to Russian players until 1910. In 1913 the International Lawn Tennis Federation was founded and the then Russia was among the seventeen nations invited. In 1914 the Russian Championships were discontinued, due to World War I and the political upheaval in the country leading to the Russian Revolution in 1917 that led to the creation of a new state the Russian Soviet Federative Socialist Republic, that became part of the Soviet Union in 1922.

In 1922 the All-Soviet Union Tennis Section formed, however it would not join the ILTF until 1956. In 1924 first Soviet Union Championships. The tournament was not held during World War II from 1941 to 1943 resuming in 1944. In 1959 the All-Soviet Union Tennis Section changed its name to the Tennis Federation of the USSR, and continued to organise the championships until 1991 when the Soviet Union ceased to being a country, and became the Russian Federation. Two years later the Tennis Federation of the USSR altered its name to the Russian Tennis Federation.

== Locations ==
The Soviet Championships were played mainly in Moscow the most times with 21 editions held there, but also staged in Adler, Almaty, Donetsk, Kaliningrad, Kharkiv, Leningrad, Riga-Jurmala, Rostov-on-Don, Tashkent, Tallinn, Tbilisi, Uzghorod and Yerevan.

== Finals ==
=== Men's singles ===
Year	Champion	Runner up	Score
1924	(Soviet Union) Georgy Alexandrovich Stoliarov	(Soviet Union) Yevgeny Arkadyevich Kudryavtsev	3–6, 9–11, 6–4, 6–4, 7–5.
1925	(Soviet Union) Yevgeny A. Kudryavtsev	(Soviet Union) Nikolai Nikolaievich Ivanov	4–6, 6–4, 6–3, 5–7, 6–1.
1926	Not held		
1927	(Soviet Union) Yevgeny A. Kudryavtsev (2)	(Soviet Union) Yevgeny Stepanovich Ovanesov	6–1, 6–0, 6–4.
1928	(Soviet Union) Yevgeny A. Kudryavtsev (3)	(Soviet Union) Vsevolod Alekseevich Verbitsky	6–4, 6–3, 0–6, 6–4.
1929/1931	Not held		
1932	(Soviet Union) Eduard Eduardovich Negrebetsky	(Soviet Union) Yevgeny A. Kudryavtsev	3–6, 6–3, 8–6, 6–2.
1933	Not held		
1934	(Soviet Union) Yevgeny A. Kudryavtsev (4)	(Soviet Union) Viacheslav Konstantinovich Multino/Multenko	8–6, 6–2, 6–4.
1935	(Soviet Union) Boris Ilyich Novikov	(Soviet Union) Eduard E. Negrebetsky	6–2, 6–3, 5–7, 6–2.
1936	(Soviet Union) Boris I. Novikov (2)	(Soviet Union) Yevgeny A. Kudryavstev	6–2, 6–3, 6–1.
1937	(Soviet Union) Boris I. Novikov (3)	(Soviet Union) Eduard E. Negrebetsky	6–1, 6–3, 0–6, 4–6, 6–0.
1938	(Soviet Union) Boris I. Novikov (4)	(Soviet Union) Eduard E. Negrebetsky	6–3, 8–6, 6–1.
1939	(Soviet Union) Boris I. Novikov (5)	(Soviet Union) Eduard E. Negrebetsky	6–8, 6–1, 3–6, 6–3, 6–3.
1940	(Soviet Union) Yuzef Gebda	(Soviet Union) Boris I. Novikov	6–2, 6–2, 6–1.
1941/1943	Not held (due to World War II)		
1944	(Soviet Union) Nikolai Nikolaievich Ozerov	(Soviet Union) Zdenek Albertovich Zigmund	4–6, 7–5, 6–4, 6–4.
1945	(Soviet Union) Nikolai N. Ozerov (2)	(Soviet Union) Semyon Pavlovich Belits-Geiman	6–4, 2–6, 3–6, 6–3, 6–3.
1946	(Soviet Union) Nikolai N. Ozerov (3)	(Soviet Union) Semyon P. Belits-Geiman	6–4, 6–2, 6–4.
1947	(Soviet Union) Eduard E. Negrebetsky (2)	(Soviet Union) Nikolai N. Ozerov	7–5, 6–4, 6–4.
1948	(Soviet Union) Boris I. Novikov (6)	(Soviet Union) Zdenek A. Zigmund	4–6, 6–2, 1–6, 6–4, 6–1.
1949	(Soviet Union) Eduard E. Negrebetsky (3)	(Soviet Union) Nikolai N. Ozerov (4)	4–6, 6–3, 6–1, 3–6, 6–3.
1950	(Soviet Union) Eduard E. Negrebetsky (4)	(Soviet Union) Nikolai N. Ozerov	6–4, 3–6, 3–6, 9–7, 6–0.
1951	(Soviet Union) Nikolai N. Ozerov (4)	(Soviet Union) Sergei Sergeevich Andreev	6–4, 6–1, 2–6, 6–3.
1952	(Soviet Union) Sergei S. Andreev	(Soviet Union) Yevgeny Vladimirovich Korbut	6–3, 9–7, 6–3.
1953	(Soviet Union) Nikolai N. Ozerov (5)	(Soviet Union) Sergei S. Andreev	6–3, 6–2, 6–3.
1954	(Soviet Union) Sergei S. Andreev (2)	(Soviet Union) Iosif Iosifovich Gager	6–1, 6–2, 6–4.
1955	(Soviet Union) Sergei S. Andreev (3)	(Soviet Union) Nikolai N. Ozerov	6–1, 6–2, 6–1.
1956	(Soviet Union) Sergei S. Andreev (4)	(Soviet Union) Nikolai N. Ozerov	6–4, 6–2, 6–1.
1957	(Soviet Union) Sergei S. Andreev (5)	(Soviet Union) Mikhail Ivanovich Mozer	6–1, 6–0, 6–1.
1958	(Soviet Union) Sergei S. Andreev (6)	(Soviet Union) Sergei Alexandrovich Likhachev	6–4, 4–6, 6–3, 9–7.
1959	(Soviet Union) Mikhail I. Mozer	(Soviet Union) Andrei Nikolaievich Potanin	9–7, 8–6, 6–2.
1960	(Soviet Union) Mikhail I. Mozer (2)	(Soviet Union) Sergei A. Likhachev	4–6, 4–6, 6–3, 6–2, 6–3.
1961	(Soviet Union) Rudolf Sergeevich Sivokhin	(Soviet Union) Sviatoslav Petrovicih Mirza	7–5, 6–2, 4–6, 1–6, 6–2.
1962	(Soviet Union) Andrei N. Potanin	(Soviet Union) Mikhail I. Mozer	3–6, 6–3, 6–4, 6–2.
1963	(Soviet Union) Tomas Karlovich Lejus	(Soviet Union) Alexander Iraklievich Metreveli	8–6, 6–2, 4–6, 6–2.
1964	(Soviet Union) Tomas K. Lejus (2)	(Soviet Union) Mikhail I. Mozer	6–1, 6–0, 6–0.
1965	(Soviet Union) Tomas K. Lejus (3)	(Soviet Union) Alexander I. Metreveli	6–3, 3–6, 4–6, 6–2, 8–6.
1966	(Soviet Union) Alexander I. Metreveli	(Soviet Union) Viacheslav Vladimirovich Egorov	7–9, 12–10, 6–4, 6–0.
1967	(Soviet Union) Alexander I. Metreveli (2)	(Soviet Union) Viacheslav V. Egorov	6–3, 6–0, 6–4.
1968	(Soviet Union) Tomas K. Lejus (4)	(Soviet Union) Alexander I. Metreveli	6–0, 6–2, 6–3.
↓ Open era ↓
1969	(Soviet Union) Alexander I. Metreveli (3)	(Soviet Union) Vladimir K. Palman	7–5, 9–7, 6–4.
1970	(Soviet Union) Alexander I. Metreveli (4)	(Soviet Union) Tomas K. Lejus	6–4, 6–4, 6–4.
1971	(Soviet Union) Alexander I. Metreveli (5)	(Soviet Union) Tomas K. Lejus	6–2, 6–1, 6–3.
1972	(Soviet Union) Alexander I. Metreveli (6)	(Soviet Union) Teimuraz Iraklievich Kakulia	6–4, 6–4, 6–1.
1973	(Soviet Union) Alexander I. Metreveli (7)	(Soviet Union) Teimuraz I. Kakulia	6–1, 6–3, 6–3.
1974	(Soviet Union) Alexander I. Metreveli (8)	(Soviet Union) Teimuraz I. Kakulia	8–6, 6–4, 6–4.
1975	(Soviet Union) Alexander I. Metreveli (9)	(Soviet Union) Teimuraz I. Kakulia	8–6, 4–6, 3–6, 6–3, 7–5.
1976	(Soviet Union) Alexander I. Metreveli (10)	(Soviet Union) Teimuraz I. Kakulia	6–3, 6–0, 3–6, 6–2.
1977	(Soviet Union) Vladimir Viktorovich Korotkov	(Soviet Union) Boris V. Borisov	6–3, 2–6, 6–3, 7–6.
1978	(Soviet Union) Alexander I. Metreveli (11)	(Soviet Union) Teimuraz I. Kakulia	6–1, 6–1, 1–6, 1–6, 7–5.
1979	(Soviet Union) Alexander Mikhailovich Zverev	(Soviet Union) Ramiz Akhmerov	6–3, 6–4, 3–6, 6–2.
1980	(Soviet Union) Alexander I. Metreveli (12)	(Soviet Union) Konstantin Pavlovich Pugayev	7–5, 6–4, 7–5.
1981	(Soviet Union) Alexander M. Zverev (2)	(Soviet Union) Konstantin P. Pugayev	6–1, 6–4, 2–6, 6–3.
1982	(Soviet Union) Konstantin P. Pugayev	(Soviet Union) Alexander M. Zverev	6–4, 6–1, 3–6, 6–7, 6–4.
1983	(Soviet Union) Sergey Nikolayevich Leonyuk	(Soviet Union) Alexander M. Zverev	6–4, 7–5, 1–6, 1–6, 6–4.
1984	(Soviet Union) Alexander M. Zverev (3)	(Soviet Union) Sergey N. Leonyuk	6–4, 6–1, 6–4.
1985	(Soviet Union) Andrei Eduardovich Chesnokov	(Soviet Union) Alexander Vladimirovich Volkov	6–2, 6–2, 6–4.
1986	(Soviet Union) Andrei E. Chesnokov (2)	(Soviet Union) Alexander Dolgopolov	7–5, 6–0, 6–4.
1987	(Soviet Union) Andrei E. Chesnokov (3)	(Soviet Union) Alexander M. Zverev	6–7, 6–4, 6–0, 6–2.
1988	(Soviet Union) Andrei E. Chesnokov (4)	(Soviet Union) Iosif Krochko	6–4, 3–6, 6–2, 6–0.
1989	(Soviet Union) Andrei E. Chesnokov (5)	(Soviet Union) Iosif Krochko	6–2, 2–6, 6–2, 6–2.
1990	(Soviet Union) Dmitri "Dimitri" Nikolaievich Poliakov	(Soviet Union) Andrei Stanislavovich Olhovskiy	6–4, 4–6, 7–5, 7–5.
1991	(Soviet Union) Dmitry Palenov	(Soviet Union) Andrei Rybalko	6–4, 6–1.

=== Women's singles ===
Year	Champion	Runner up	Score
1924	(Soviet Union) Tamira Kazimirovna Sukhodolskaia	(Soviet Union) Sofia Vasilievna Maltseva	6–3, 6–4
1925	(Soviet Union) Elena D. Alexandrova	(Soviet Union) Tamira K. Sukhodolskaia	6–3, 6–2
1926	Not held		
1927	(Soviet Union) Nina Teplyakova	(Soviet Union) Elena D. Alexandrova	8–6, 6–4
1928	(Soviet Union) Sofia V. Maltseva	(Soviet Union) Nina S. Teplyakova	6–4, 6–4
1929/1931	Not held		
1932	(Soviet Union) Sofia V. Maltseva (2)	(Soviet Union) Elena D. Alexandrova	6–2, 6–2
1933	Not held		
1934	(Soviet Union) Nina S. Teplyakova (2)	(Soviet Union) Evgenia Shekhter	6–4, 6–0
1935	(Soviet Union) Nina S. Teplyakova (3)	(Soviet Union) Maria Viktorovna Meyer	6–2, 6–3
1936	(Soviet Union) Nina S. Teplyakova (4)	(Soviet Union) Elena D. Alexandrova	6–4, 6–3
1937	(Soviet Union) Nina S. Teplyakova (5)	(Soviet Union) Galina Sergeevna Korovina	6–3, 8–6
1938	(Soviet Union) Nina S. Teplyakova (6)	(Soviet Union) Galina S. Korovina	2–6, 6–0, 9–7
1939	(Soviet Union) Nina S. Teplyakova (7)	(Soviet Union) Galina S. Korovina	6–4, 6–4
1940	(Soviet Union) Galina S. Korovina	(Soviet Union) Nadezhda Mitrofanovna Belonenko	7–5, 6–1
1941/1943	Not held (due to World War II)		
1944	(Soviet Union) Galina S. Korovina (2)	(Soviet Union) Nadezhda M. Belonenko	1–6, 6–3, 6–4
1945	(Soviet Union) Galina S. Korovina (3)	(Soviet Union) Nadezhda M. Belonenko	2–6, 6–2, 7–5
1946	(Soviet Union) Olga Nikolaievna Kalmykova	(Soviet Union) Nadezhda M. Belonenko	6–3, 6–3
1947	(Soviet Union) Olga N. Kalmykova (2)	(Soviet Union) Antonina Ferdinandovna Gorina	6–0, 6–2
1948	(Soviet Union) Nadezhda M. Belonenko	(Soviet Union) Galina S. Korovina	5–7, 6–4, 6–0
1949	(Soviet Union) Nadezhda M. Belonenko (2)	(Soviet Union) Tatiana Borisovna Nalimova	6–3, 8–6
1950	(Soviet Union) Nadezhda M. Belonenko (3)	(Soviet Union) Galina S. Korovina	6–2, 1–6, 8–6
1951	(Soviet Union) Elizaveta Mikhailovna Chuvirina	(Soviet Union) Nadezhda M. Belonenko	6–2, 2–6, 6–4
1952	(Soviet Union) Elizaveta M. Chuvirina (2)	(Soviet Union) Tatiana B. Nalimova	4–6, 7–5, 6–0
1953	(Soviet Union) Elizaveta M. Chuvirina (3)	(Soviet Union) Klavdia Alexeevna Borisova	6–2, 6–3
1954	(Soviet Union) Elizaveta M. Chuvirina (4)	(Soviet Union) Antonina Fedorovna Kuzmina	6–1, 6–1
1955	(Soviet Union) Larisa Dmitrievna /Gorina→/Preobrazhenskaia	(Soviet Union) Valeria Ivanovna Kuzmenko/Titova	7–5, 6–2
1956	(Soviet Union) Valeria I. Kuzmenko/Titova	(Soviet Union) Larisa D. /Gorina→/Preobrazhenskaia	3–6, 7–5, 6–4
1957	(Soviet Union) Margarita Iourievna Emelyanova	(Soviet Union) Elizaveta M. Chuvirina	7–5, 6–3
1958	(Soviet Union) Valeria I. Kuzmenko/Titova (2)	(Soviet Union) Anna Vladimirovna Dmitrieva	6–4, 6–2
1959	(Soviet Union) Anna V. Dmitrieva	(Soviet Union) Valeria I. Kuzmenko/Titova	6–4, 8–6
1960	(Soviet Union) Valeria I. Kuzmenko/Titova (3)	(Soviet Union) Anna V. Dmitrieva	8–6, 6–2
1961	(Soviet Union) Anna V. Dmitrieva (2)	(Soviet Union) Valeria I. Kuzmenko-Titova	6–1, 6–0
1962	(Soviet Union) Anna V. Dmitrieva (3)	(Soviet Union) Irina Evnenyevna Ryazanova/Ermolova	4–6, 6–3, 6–0
1963	(Soviet Union) Anna V. Dmitrieva (4)	(Soviet Union) Irina E. Ryazanova/Ermolova	6–3, 6–3
1964	(Soviet Union) Anna V. Dmitrieva (5)	(Soviet Union) Vera Ivanovna Yaremkevich/Troshkina	6–2, 6–1
1965	(Soviet Union) Tiju Soome/Simson	(Soviet Union) Galina Petrovna Baksheeva	6–4, 7–5
1966	(Soviet Union) Galina P. Baksheeva	(Soviet Union) Rena Abjandadze	6–3 6–2
1967	(Soviet Union) Galina P. Baksheeva (2)	(Soviet Union) Anna V. Dmitrieva	1–6, 6–3, 6–3
1968	(Soviet Union) Tiiu /Kivi-/Parmas	(Soviet Union) Galina P. Baksheeva	3–6, 6–3, 6–1
↓ Open era ↓
1969	(Soviet Union) Olga Vasilievna Morozova	(Soviet Union) Rauza Mukhamedzhanovna Islanova	7–5, 6–2
1970	(Soviet Union) Olga V. Morozova (2)	(Soviet Union) Zaiga Yansone	6–4, 6–3
1971	(Soviet Union) Olga V. Morozova (3)	(Soviet Union) Galina P. Baksheeva	6–2, 6–2
1972	(Soviet Union) Eugenia Iourievna Birioukova	(Soviet Union) Tiiu /Kivi-/Parmas	6–3, 6–2
1973	(Soviet Union) Marina Vasilievna Kroschina	(Soviet Union) Rauza M. Islanova	6–1, 6–4
1974	(Soviet Union) Marina V. Kroschina (2)	(Soviet Union) Yelena Grigoryevna Granaturova	5–7, 6–3, 6–3
1975	(Soviet Union) Marina V. Kroschina (3)	(Soviet Union) Evgenia I. Birioukova	4–6, 6–2, 6–3
1976	(Soviet Union) Olga V. Morozova (4)	(Soviet Union) Galina P. Baksheeva	6–3, 6–3
1977	(Soviet Union) Natalia Vasilievna Borodina	(Soviet Union) Evgenia I. Biriukova	4–6, 6–4, 6–4
1978	(Soviet Union) Natalya "Natasha" Yurievna Chmyreva	(Soviet Union) Yelena G. Granaturova	6–4, 1–6, 8–6
1979	(Soviet Union) Marina V. Kroschina (4)	(Soviet Union) Olga V. Morozova	6–2, 6–2
1980	(Soviet Union) Olga V. Morozova (5)	(Soviet Union) Ludmila Nikolaievna Makarova	6–7, 6–4, 6–4
1981	(Soviet Union) Marina V. Kroschina	(Soviet Union) Natalia Vladimirovna Reva	1–6, 6–3, 8–6
1982	(Soviet Union) Ludmila N. Makarova	(Soviet Union) N. Avdeeva	7–5, 6–3
1983	(Soviet Union) Elena Pavlovna Eliseenko	(Soviet Union) Svetlana Germanovna Cherneva	6–4, 7–5
1984	(Soviet Union) Viktoria Mikhailovna Milvidskaia	(Soviet Union) Oksana Nikolaievna Lifanova	6–0, 6–4
1985	(Soviet Union) Svetlana G. /Cherneva→/Parkhomenko	(Soviet Union) Yulia Sergeyevna Salnikova	6–7, 6–4, 6–2
1986	(Soviet Union) Natalya "Natasha" Maratovna Zvereva	(Soviet Union) Leila Georgievna Meskhi	6–2, 6–4
1987	(Soviet Union) Natalya M. Zvereva (2)	(Soviet Union) Viktoria M. Milvidskaia	6–1, 6–2
1988	(Soviet Union) Eugenia Alexandrovna Maniokova	(Soviet Union) Anna Sviatoslavovna Mirza	6–3, 3–6, 6–3
1989	(Soviet Union) Leila G. Meskhi	(Soviet Union) Natalia Olegovna Medvedeva	4–6, 6–3, 6–0
1990	(Soviet Union) Eugenia A. Maniokova (2)	(Soviet Union) Elena Alexeievna Makarova	6–3, 6–2
1991	(Soviet Union) Svetlana Komleva	(Soviet Union) Eugenia A. Maniokova	6–3, 6–2
