= Irina Ermolova =

Soviet tennis player

- Full name: Irina Evgenyevna Ermolova; Ирина Евгеньевна Ермолова
- Native name: Ирина Ермолова
- Country (sports): Soviet Union
- Residence: Vygonichi, Russia
- Born: 2 April 1938 (age 87); Tbilisi, Georgian SSR, USSR

Singles

Grand Slam singles results
- Wimbledon: 1R (1960)

Doubles

Grand Slam doubles results
- Wimbledon: 2R (1960)

Mixed doubles

Grand Slam mixed doubles results
- Wimbledon: 2R (1960)
Medal record
Representing Soviet Union
Women's Tennis
Summer Universiade
Gold medal – first place	1959 Turin	Women's Singles
Silver medal – second place	1963 Porto Alegre	Women's Singles
Silver medal – second place	1965 Budapest	Women's Singles
Silver medal – second place	1965 Budapest	Women's Doubles
Silver medal – second place	1965 Budapest	Mixed Doubles

Irina Evgenyevna Ermolova (née Ryazanova; Russian: Ирина Евгеньевна Рязанова-Ермолова; born 1938) is a former female tennis player who competed for the Soviet Union.

She played in Singles at the Wimbledon in 1960. She lost to the British Pat Hales in the First Round. Her partner in Women's Doubles, citizen Anna Dmitrieva lost in the Second Round to the British players Elaine Shenton and Liz Starkie. Her partner in mixed doubles citizen Toomas Leius lost in the Second Round to the British players Humphrey Truman and Christine Truman.

== Career finals ==
=== Singles (4–5) ===
Result	No.	Year	location	Surface	Opponent	Score
Loss	1.	1958	Moscow Outdoor Championships	Clay	(Soviet Union) Valeria Kuzmenko Titova	4–6, 2–6
Win	1.	1959	Moscow Outdoor Championships	Clay	(Soviet Union) Valeria Kuzmenko Titova	6–4, 8–6
Loss	2.	1960	Central India Championships	Hard	(United States) Mimi Arnold	4–6, 1–6
Win	2.	1960	Moscow International Indoor Championships	Wood (i)	(France) Aline Nenot	6–4, 7–5
Win	3.	1961	Moscow International Indoor Championships	Wood (i)	(Italy) Silvana Lazzarino	6–8, 6–2, 6–0
Loss	3.	1962	USSR Championships	Clay	(Soviet Union) Anna Dmitrieva	4–6, 6–3, 6–0
Loss	4.	1963	Moscow Indoor Championships	Hard (i)	(Soviet Union) Anna Dmitrieva	4–6, 3–6
Loss	5.	1963	USSR Championships	Clay	(Soviet Union) Anna Dmitrieva	3–6, 3–6
Win	4.	1963	Zinnowitz International, East Germany	Clay	(Czechoslovakia) Vlasta Kodešová	6–4, 6–2

=== Doubles (10–4) ===
Result	No.	Year	location	Surface	Partner	Opponents	Score
Loss	1.	January 1960	Calcutta, India	Hard	(Soviet Union) Anna Dmitrieva	(Australia) Margaret Hellyer (United States) Mimi Arnold	5–7, 2–6
Win	1.	January 1960	New Delhi, India	Hard	(Soviet Union) Anna Dmitrieva	(Australia) Margaret Hellyer (United States) Mimi Arnold	4–6, 7–5, 6–0
Win	2.	January 1960	Indore, India	Hard	(Soviet Union) Anna Dmitrieva	(India) Dechu Appaiah (India) Leela Panjabi	7–5, 6–1
Win	3.	March 1960	Moscow, Soviet Union	Hard (i)	(Soviet Union) Anna Dmitrieva	(Soviet Union) Vera Filippova (Soviet Union) Larissa Preobrazhenskaya	6–2, 6–2
Loss	2.	March 1960	Moscow, Soviet Union	Hard	(Soviet Union) Anna Dmitrieva	(Czechoslovakia) Věra Suková (Soviet Union) Velve Tamm	6–8, 4–6
Win	4.	July 1960	Moscow, Soviet Union	Clay	(Soviet Union) Valeria Kuzmenko Titova	(Soviet Union) Vera Filipova (Soviet Union) Larissa Preobrazhenskaya	6–4, 6–3
Win	5.	August 1960	Moscow, Soviet Union	Hard	(Soviet Union) Anna Dmitrieva	(Soviet Union) Vera Filippova (Soviet Union) Larissa Preobrazhenskaya	6–4, 6–4
Win	6.	5 March 1961	Moscow, Soviet Union	Hard (i)	(Soviet Union) Anna Dmitrieva	(Soviet Union) Vera Filippova (Soviet Union) Larissa Preobrazhenskaya	6–0, 6–2
Win	7.	July 1961	Sopot, Poland	Clay	(Soviet Union) Larissa Preobrazhenskaya	(Soviet Union) Galina Baksheeva (Soviet Union) Valeria Kuzmenko Titova	6–4, 3–6, 6–4
Win	8.	February 1963	Moscow, Soviet Union	Hard (i)	(Soviet Union) Tiiu Soome	(Soviet Union) Vera Filippova (Soviet Union) Larissa Preobrazhenskaya	6–4, 3–6, 6–2
Win	9.	June 1963	Prague, Czechoslovakia	Clay	(Soviet Union) Anna Dmitrieva	(Czechoslovakia) Zdena Stachová (Czechoslovakia) Vlasta Kodešová	6–4, 5–7, 6–1
Win	10.	July 1963	Zinnowitz, East Germany	Clay	(Czechoslovakia) Vlasta Kodešová	(West Germany) Eva Johannes (West Germany) Hellah Riede Vahlev	6–3, 6–3
Loss	3.	February 1966	Moscow, Soviet Union	Hard (i)	(Soviet Union) Galina Baksheeva	(Soviet Union) Rena Abzhandadze (Soviet Union) Aleksandra Ivanova	2–6, 6–1, 4–6
Loss	4.	October 1966	Alma Ata, Soviet Union	Hard (i)	(Soviet Union) Aleksandra Ivanova	(Soviet Union) Galina Baksheeva (Soviet Union) Valeria Kuzmenko Titova	2–6, 2–6
