= Tennis at the 1965 Summer Universiade =

Tennis events were contested at the 1965 Summer Universiade in Budapest, Hungary.

== Medal summary ==
Event	Gold	Silver	Bronze
Men's singles	Ion Țiriac (ROU)	Toomas Leius (URS)	Allen Fox (USA)
Men's doubles	Dick Dell and Allen Fox (USA)	Toomas Leius and Likhachev (URS)	Petre Marmureanu and Ion Țiriac (ROU)
Women's singles	Maria Teresa Riedl (ITA)	Irina Ermolova (URS)	Erzsébet Széll (HUN)
Women's doubles	Alessandra Gobbò and Maria Teresa Riedl (ITA)	Vera Sazonova and Irina Ermolova (URS)	Eva De Jong and Anja Lepoutre (NED)
Mixed doubles	Judith Dibar and Ion Țiriac (ROU)	Irina Ermolova and Toomas Leius (URS)	Maria Teresa Riedl and Giordano Maioli (ITA)

== Medal table ==
Rank	Nation	Gold	Silver	Bronze	Total
1	Italy (ITA)	2	0	1	3
1	Romania (ROU)	2	0	1	3
3	United States (USA)	1	0	1	2
4	Soviet Union (URS)	0	5	0	5
5	Hungary (HUN)	0	0	1	1
5	Netherlands (NED)	0	0	1	1
Totals (6 entries)		5	5	5	15

== See also ==
- Tennis at the Summer Universiade
