= Soviet Championship =

Soviet Championship may refer to:

- Russian Volleyball Super League
- Soviet Championship (rugby union)
- Soviet Championship League, ice hockey league
- USSR Chess Championship

== See also ==
- USSR Championship (disambiguation)
