= Ion Țiriac =

Romanian tennis player (born 1939)

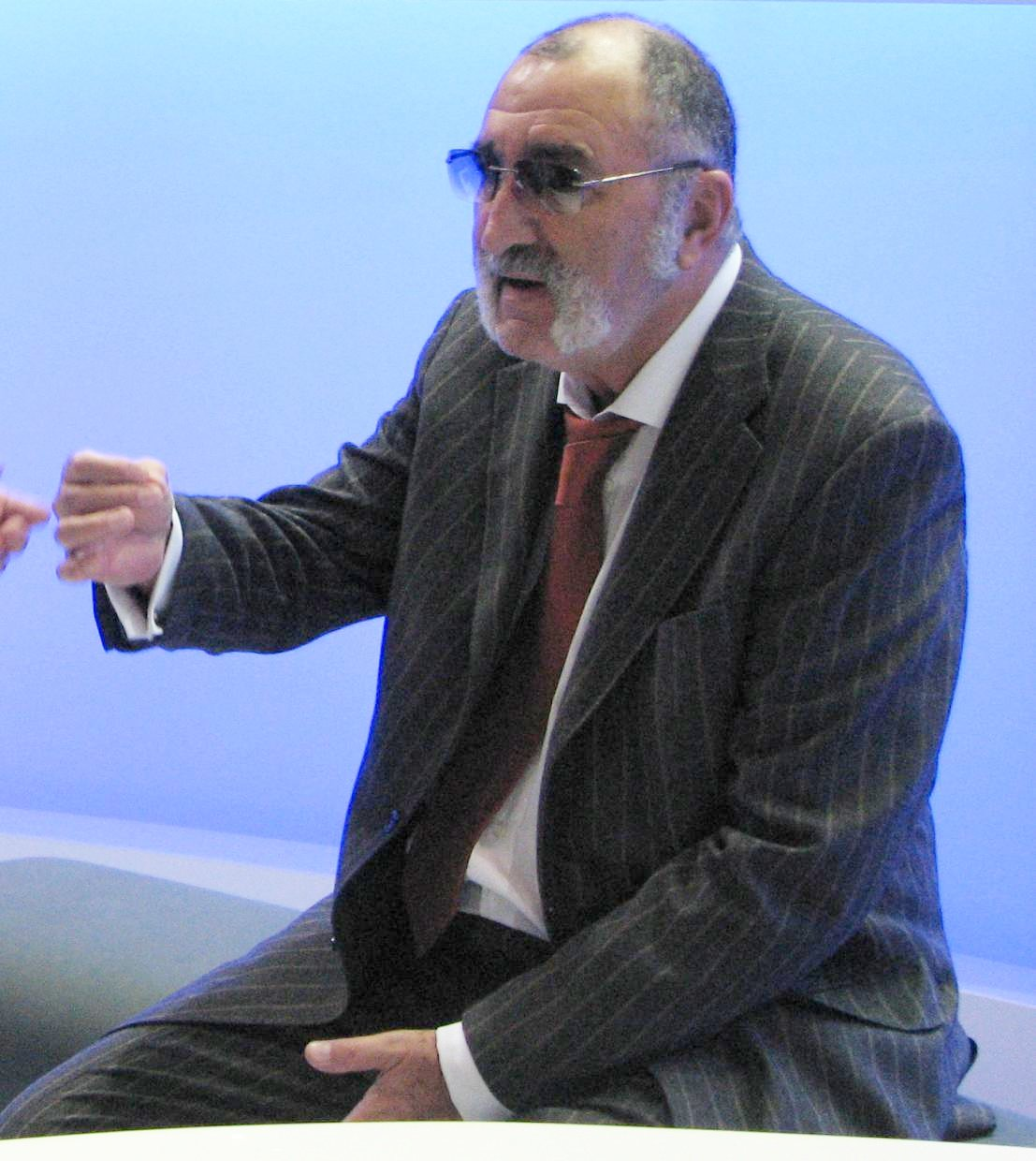
- Țiriac in 2008
- Country (sports): Romania
- Residence: Bucharest, Romania
- Born: 9 May 1939 (age 87) Brașov, Romania
- Height: 1.83 m (6 ft 0 in)
- Turned pro: 1968 (amateur from 1958)
- Retired: 1979
- Plays: Right-handed (one-handed backhand)
- Int. Tennis HoF: 2013 (member page)

Singles
- Career record: 454–303
- Career titles: 34
- Highest ranking: No. 19 (1968, World's Top 10)

Grand Slam singles results
- Australian Open: 2R (1977^{Jan})
- French Open: QF (1968)
- Wimbledon: 4R (1967, 1972)
- US Open: 3R (1973)

Doubles
- Career record: 294–141
- Career titles: 22
- Highest ranking: No. 8 (9 April 1979)

Grand Slam doubles results
- Australian Open: 2R (1977^{Jan})
- French Open: W (1970)
- Wimbledon: SF (1970)

Team competitions
- Davis Cup: F (1969^{Ch}, 1971^{Ch}, 1972)
Medal record
Representing Romania
Tennis
Summer Universiade
| Bronze medal – third place | 1961 Sofia | Singles |
| Bronze medal – third place | 1961 Sofia | Mixed Doubles |
| Gold medal – first place | 1965 Budapest | Singles |
| Gold medal – first place | 1965 Budapest | Mixed Doubles |
| Bronze medal – third place | 1965 Budapest | Doubles |

Ion Țiriac (Romanian pronunciation: [iˈon t͡siriˈak]; born 9 May 1939), also known as the "Brașov Bulldozer", is a Romanian billionaire businessman, former professional tennis and ice hockey player and president of the Romanian Tennis Federation.

A former singles top 10 player on the ATP Tour, he was active from 1958 to 1979 and won 34 career singles titles. Tiriac was the winner of one grand slam title, the 1970 French Open in men's doubles. Țiriac was the first man to play against a woman and defeat her, in a sanctioned tennis tournament (against Abigail Maynard, in 1975). The highlight of his ice hockey career was participating as a defenseman in the Romanian national team at the 1964 Winter Olympics.

After retirement, Tiriac became active as a tennis coach, advisor and player agent in the 1980s, taking under his wing Ilie Năstase, Manuel Orantes, Adriano Panatta, Guillermo Vilas, Henri Leconte and the young Boris Becker. Later, Țiriac developed the Mutua Madrid Open ATP masters tennis tournament, which he owned from 2009 to 2021. In 2013, he was elected as contributor into the International Tennis Hall of Fame. He has been managing French tennis player Lucas Pouille since December 2016.

As a tennis player, Tiriac played five-setters against Rod Laver, Stan Smith, Jan Kodeš and Manuel Orantes. His singles record includes wins over Arthur Ashe, Stan Smith, Roscoe Tanner, Manuel Orantes, Andrés Gimeno, Adriano Panatta and Niki Pilić. He played three Davis Cup finals (in 1969, 1971 and 1972).

As of July 2025, Forbes ranked him as one of the wealthiest people in Romania with a net worth of $2.5 billion.

== Sports career ==
Țiriac was born in Transylvania, which is probably the reason why he has the nickname 'Count Dracula'. The first sport he practiced, as a child, was table tennis.

Later he played ice hockey as a defenceman, winning a Romanian Hockey League title with CCA București in 1961, he also played for Știința București. Țiriac represented Romania's ice hockey team at the 1961 Ice Hockey World Championships where he was used by player-coach Zoltan Czaka in five games in which he scored five goals as the team finished on the 15th place. He was called up by coach Mihai Flamaropol to be in Romania's squad at the 1964 Winter Olympics.

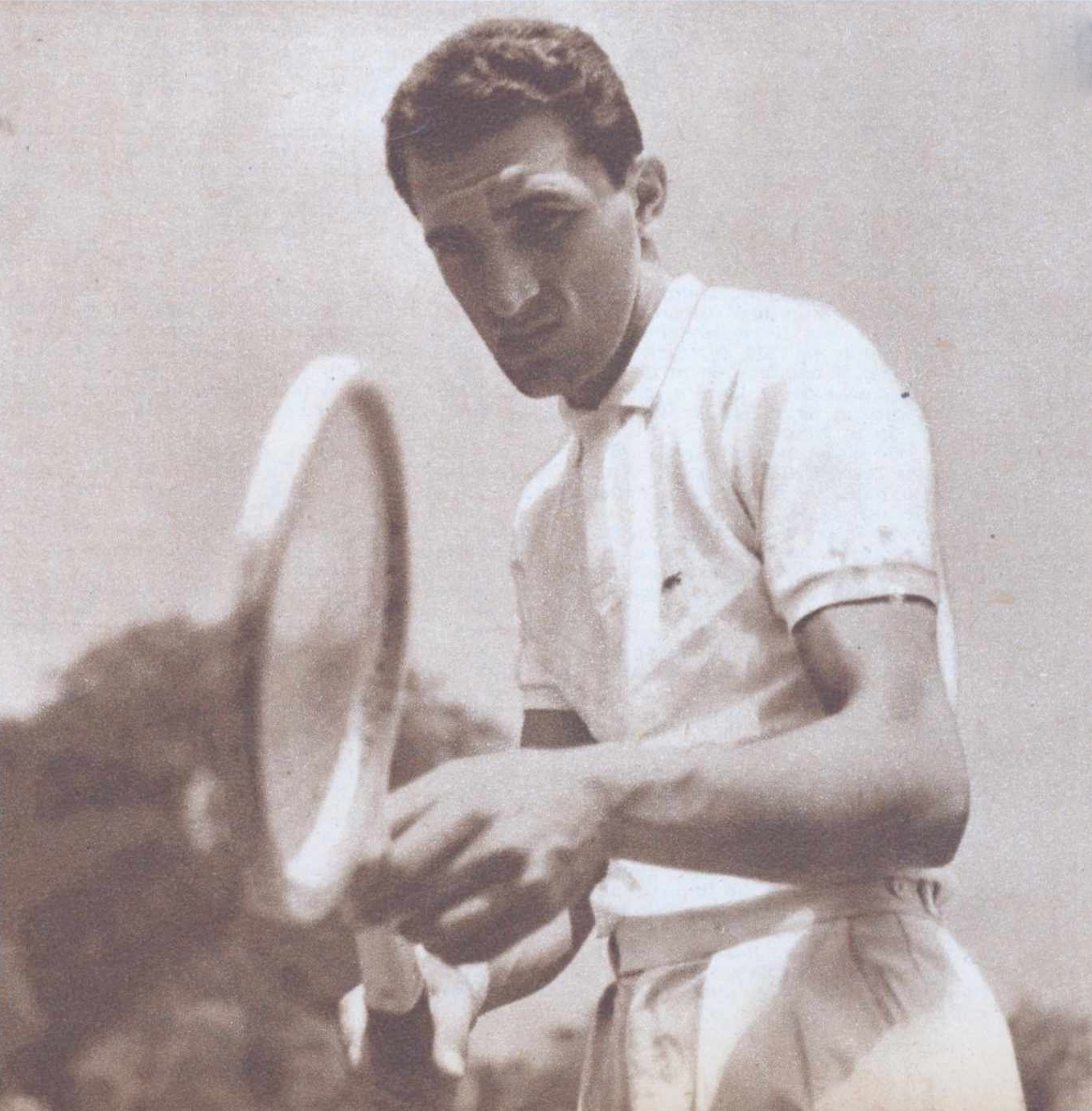
Țiriac in 1965

Shortly after that he switched to tennis as his main sport. With fellow Romanian Ilie Năstase he won the men's doubles in the 1970 French Open and reached the Davis Cup finals several times in the 1970s.

John McPhee wrote of him that his drooping mustache suggests "that this man has been to places most people do not imagine exist. He appears to be a panatela ad, a triple agent from Alexandria, a used-car salesman from central Marrakesh. Tiriac has the air of a man who is about to close a deal in a back room behind a back room."

Țiriac participated in the short period during the 1970s when women participated in established men's tennis tournaments. In his first match he defeated Abigail Maynard 6–0, 6–0 in their round one match at USTA pro circuit's Fairfield County International Tennis Championship. It was the first time ever a female had entered a men's tournament.

=== Executive roles ===
After his retirement, he was coach and manager for players such as Ilie Năstase, Guillermo Vilas, Mary Joe Fernández, Goran Ivanišević and Marat Safin. He became the sports agent of Boris Becker and managed his career from 1984 to 1993.

Țiriac was president of the Romanian Olympic and Sports Committee from 1998 to 2004.

Țiriac ran major men's events in Germany, including the season-ending championships in Hanover. Although tennis is now a much smaller part of his portfolio and occupies only 5 percent of his time, he has taken particular pleasure and pride in making Madrid Tennis Open a combined men's and women's event with €7.2 million in total prize money. The trophy awarded to the tournament winner bears his name.

Țiriac also held the license for the BRD Năstase Țiriac Trophy tennis tournament since 1996, until its last edition in 2016, before the tournament being relocated to Budapest.

In 2012, Țiriac was nominated for the International Tennis Hall of Fame in the contributor category.

On 13 July 2013, Țiriac joined the International Tennis Hall of Fame as a successful promoter and tournament director for numerous events including two of the largest Masters 1000 events, the Italian Open and the Madrid Masters.

== Business career ==
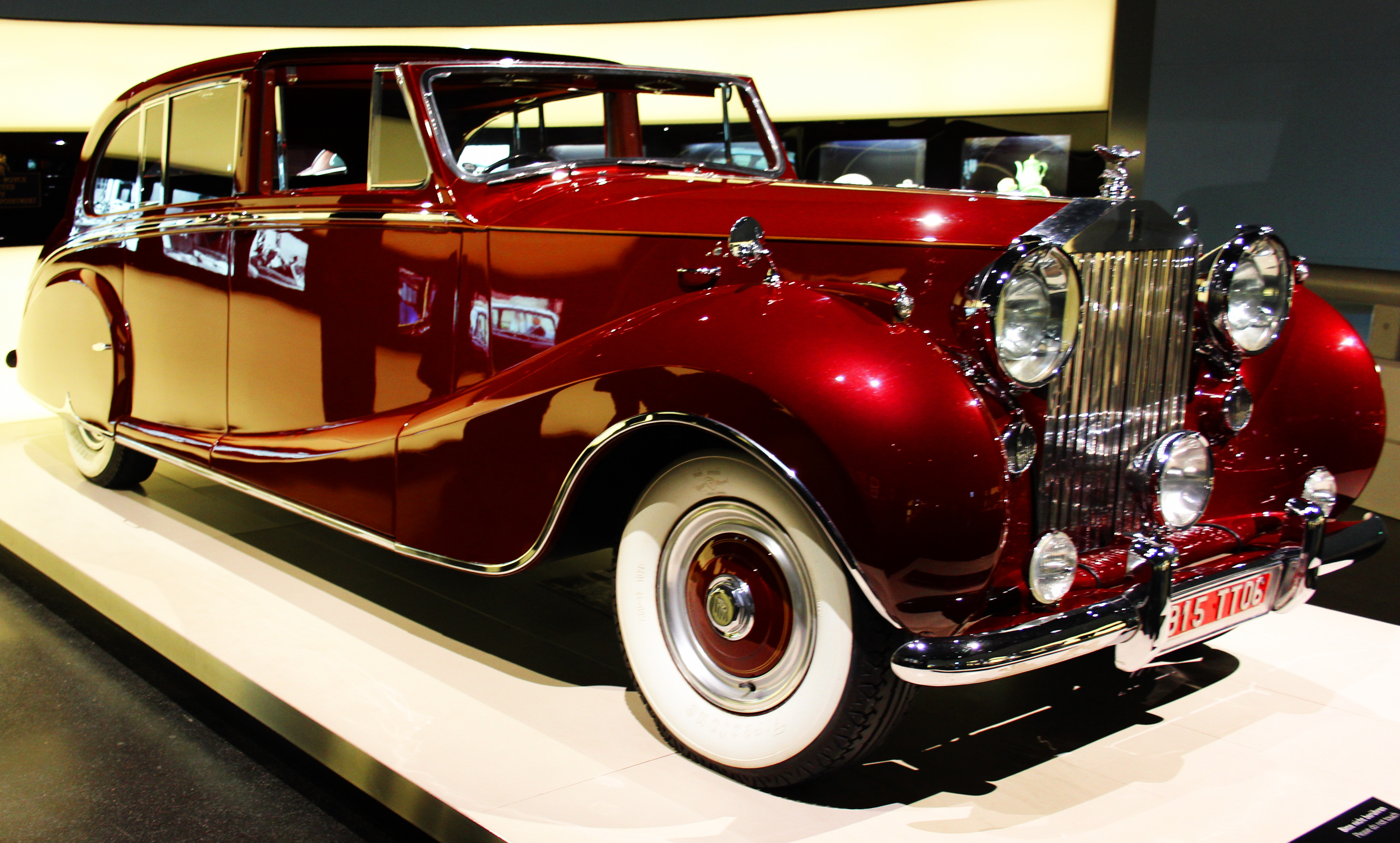
One of two Rolls-Royce Phantom IV owned by Țiriac, part of his car collection.

After his retirement as a professional tennis player, Țiriac became a businessman in (then West) Germany. In 1987, he appeared in a TV commercial for Miller Lite beer with Bob Uecker, who extols Țiriac's supposed humorous qualities, laughing hysterically while Țiriac sits stone-faced. In reality, Țiriac was popular and outgoing, especially when he was player/coach of the Boston Lobsters of World Team Tennis in the 1970s.

In Germany, Țiriac met another Romanian businessman, Dan Petrescu. Țiriac and Petrescu became economic partners and collaborated in the development of several companies in the following years.

Following the collapse of communism in Romania, Țiriac started numerous businesses and investments back home. In 1990, he founded Ion Țiriac Bank, the first private bank in post-Communist Romania. Between that and several other enterprises (retail, insurance, auto leasing, auto dealerships, airlines, etc.), his fortune was estimated at over US$900 million in 2005.

Țiriac is an avid car collector. The Tiriac Collection represents the exhibition of cars and motorcycles under his ownership. Reopened to the public in May 2015, the collection includes historical vehicles manufactured since 1899 and also modern exotics with about 350 cars and 165 cars at full time display on a rotation basis. Visitors will find the only collection in the world with 2 Rolls-Royce Phantoms IV, as well as exhibits that previously belonged to great names such as Sir Elton John, Sammy Davis Jr. or Bernie Ecclestone.

In 2006, Țiriac was selected as one of the 100 Greatest Romanians, ranking #77.

Țiriac became the first Romanian to enter Forbes' List of billionaires in the 2007 Forbes rankings, ranking 840th in the world. His wealth was estimated at $1.0 billion as of 2010, according to the magazine. In 2010, TOP 300 Capital declared Ion Țiriac the richest man in Romania with a wealth estimated at €1.5–€1.6 billion ($2–$2.2 billion).

In 2018, Ion Țiriac ranked #1867 on the Forbes World's Billionaires list, with wealth listed at US$1.2 billion.

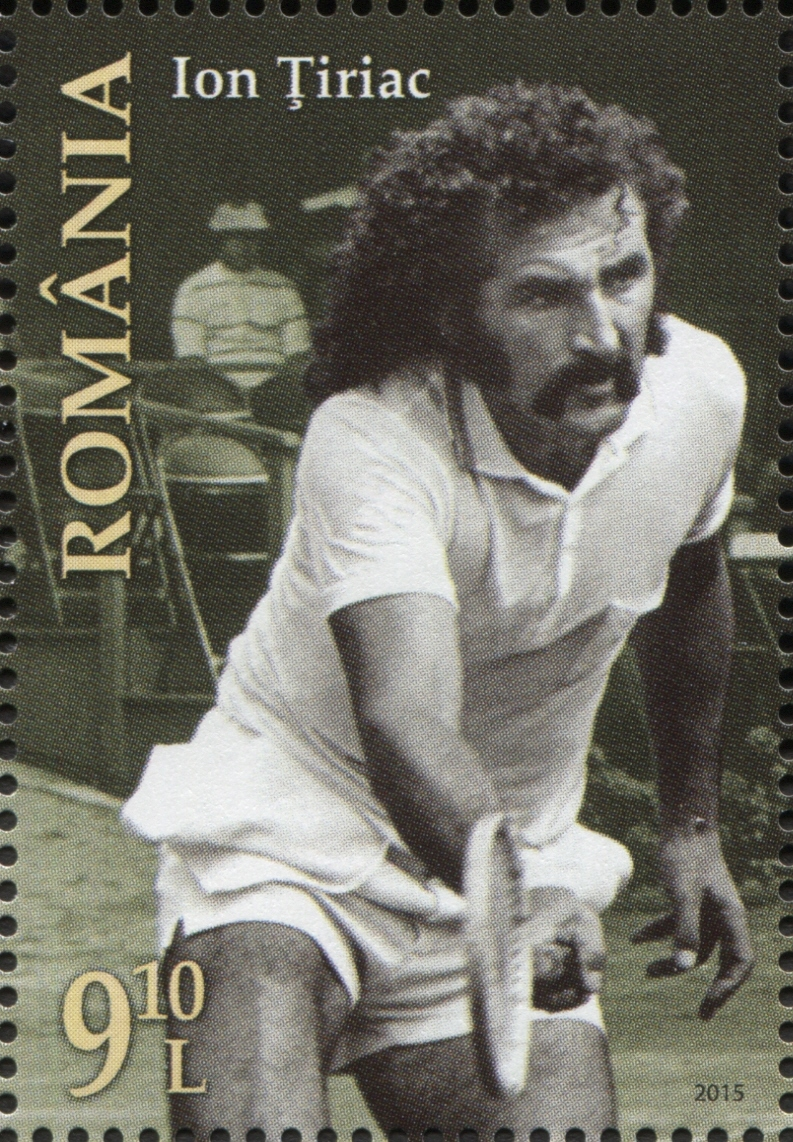
Țiriac on a Romanian postage stamp

== Personal life ==
Țiriac was married to Romanian handball player Erika Braedt from 1963 until their divorce in 1965.

Țiriac has three publicly acknowledged children. His eldest son, Ion Alexandru Țiriac (known as Ion Țiriac Jr.), is from his relationship with French-American former fashion model Mikette von Issenberg. His other two children, Karim Mihai and Ioana Natalia, are from his relationship with Egyptian journalist Sophie Ayad.

In 2008, Țiriac reportedly stated that he had three "official" children and 30 "unofficial" children. However, in a 2010 interview, he denied having claimed to have 33 children, explaining that he also considered children from orphanages he had visited to be his responsibility, alongside his three biological children.

According to Cinemagia, he dubbed the character Kron for the Romanian version of Dinosaur.

== Career statistics ==
=== Grand Slam finals ===
==== Doubles 2 (1–1) ====
| Result | Year | Championship | Surface | Partner | Opponents | Score |
|---|---|---|---|---|---|---|
| Loss | 1966 | French Championships | Clay | (Romania) Ilie Năstase | (United States) Dennis Ralston (United States) Clark Graebner | 3–6, 3–6, 0–6 |
| Win | 1970 | French Open | Clay | (Romania) Ilie Năstase | (United States) Arthur Ashe (United States) Charlie Pasarell | 6–2, 6–4, 6–3 |

=== Grand Prix and WCT Tour finals ===
==== Singles (2–1) ====
| Result | W–L | Date | Tournament | Surface | Opponent | Score |
|---|---|---|---|---|---|---|
| Win | 1–0 | Aug 1970 | Munich, Germany | Clay | (Socialist Federal Republic of Yugoslavia) Nikola Pilić | 2–6, 9–7, 6–3, 6–4 |
| Win | 2–0 | May 1971 | Madrid, Spain | Clay | (Romania) Ilie Năstase | 7–5, 6–1, 6–0 |
| Loss | 2–1 | Feb 1972 | Omaha, Nebraska, US | Hard (i) | (Romania) Ilie Năstase | 6–2, 0–6, 1–6 |

==== Doubles (22–24) ====
Key

Grand Slam tournaments
Grand Prix Masters
Group 1 tournaments
Group 2 tournaments
Team events

| Result | W–L | Date | Tournament | Surface | Partner | Opponents | Score |
|---|---|---|---|---|---|---|---|
| Win | 1–0 | Feb 1970 | Philadelphia WCT, US | Carpet | (Romania) Ilie Năstase | (United States) Arthur Ashe (United States) Dennis Ralston | 6–4, 6–3 |
| Win | 2–0 | May 1970 | French Open, Paris | Clay | (Romania) Ilie Năstase | (United States) Arthur Ashe (United States) Charlie Pasarell | 6–2, 6–4, 6–3 |
| Win | 3–0 | Apr 1970 | Rome, Italy | Clay | (Romania) Ilie Năstase | (Australia) William Bowrey (Australia) Owen Davidson | 0–6, 10–8, 6–3, 6–8, 6–1 |
| Loss | 3–1 | Jul 1970 | Washington, D.C., US | Clay | (Romania) Ilie Năstase | (South Africa) Bob Hewitt (South Africa) Frew McMillan | 5–7, 0–6 |
| Win | 4–1 | Jul 1970 | Cincinnati, US | Clay | (Romania) Ilie Năstase | (South Africa) Bob Hewitt (South Africa) Frew McMillan | 6–3, 6–4 |
| Loss | 4–2 | Jul 1970 | Indianapolis, US | Clay | (Romania) Ilie Năstase | (United States) Arthur Ashe (United States) Clark Graebner | 6–2, 4–6, 4–6 |
| Loss | 4–3 | Nov 1970 | London, UK | Carpet | (Romania) Ilie Năstase | (Australia) Ken Rosewall (United States) Stan Smith | 4–6, 3–6, 2–6 |
| Win | 5–3 | Mar 1971 | Hampton, US | Hard (i) | (Romania) Ilie Năstase | (United States) Clark Graebner (Brazil) Thomaz Koch | 6–4, 4–6, 7–5 |
| Win | 6–3 | Apr 1971 | Monte-Carlo, Monaco | Clay | (Romania) Ilie Năstase | (Netherlands) Tom Okker (United Kingdom) Roger Taylor | 1–6, 6–3, 6–3, 8–6 |
| Loss | 6–4 | Apr 1971 | Palermo, Sicily, Italy | Clay | (Romania) Ilie Năstase | (France) Georges Goven (France) Pierre Barthès | 2–6, 3–6 |
| Loss | 6–5 | May 1971 | Brussels, Belgium | Clay | (Romania) Ilie Năstase | (United States) Marty Riessen (Netherlands) Tom Okker | |
| Win | 7–5 | Feb 1972 | Kansas City, US | Indoor | (Romania) Ilie Năstase | (Spain) Andrés Gimeno (Spain) Manuel Orantes | 6–7, 6–4, 7–6 |
| Loss | 7–6 | Feb 1972 | Los Angeles, California, US | | (Romania) Ilie Năstase | (United States) Jim Osborne (United States) Jim McManus | 2–6, 7–5, 4–6 |
| Win | 8–6 | Mar 1972 | Hampton, US | Hard (i) | (Romania) Ilie Năstase | (Spain) Andrés Gimeno (Spain) Manuel Orantes | 6–4, 7–6 |
| Win | 9–6 | Apr 1972 | Rome, Italy | Clay | (Romania) Ilie Năstase | (Australia) Lew Hoad (South Africa) Frew McMillan | 3–6, 3–6, 6–4, 6–3, 5–3, RET. |
| Loss | 9–7 | May 1972 | Bournemouth, England | Clay | (Romania) Ilie Năstase | (South Africa) Frew McMillan (South Africa) Bob Hewitt | 5–7, 2–6 |
| Loss | 9–8 | Jun 1972 | Hamburg, Germany | Clay | (South Africa) Bob Hewitt | (Romania) Ilie Năstase (Czechoslovakia) Jan Kodeš | 6–4, 0–6, 6–3, 2–6, 2–6 |
| Win | 10–8 | Aug 1972 | Montreal, Canada | Clay | (Romania) Ilie Năstase | (Czechoslovakia) Jan Kodeš (Czechoslovakia) Jan Kukal | 7–6, 6–3 |
| Loss | 10–9 | Feb 1973 | Des Moines, Iowa, US | Hard | (Spain) Juan Gisbert | (Czechoslovakia) Jan Kukal (Czechoslovakia) Jiří Hřebec | 6–4, 6–7, 1–6 |
| Loss | 10–10 | Mar 1973 | Hampton, Virginia, US | Hard | (United States) Jimmy Connors | (Romania) Ilie Năstase (United States) Clark Graebner | 6–4, 6–7, 1–6 |
| Win | 11–10 | Mar 1973 | Valencia, Spain | Clay | (United States) Mike Estep | (Belgium) Patrick Hombergen (Belgium) Bernard Mignot | 6–4, 1–6, 10–8 |
| Loss | 11–11 | Apr 1973 | Barcelona, Spain | Clay | (United States) Mike Estep | (Spain) Manuel Orantes (Spain) Juan Gisbert | 4–6, 6–7 |
| Loss | 11–12 | May 1973 | Bournemouth, England | Clay | (Italy) Adriano Panatta | (Romania) Ilie Năstase (Spain) Juan Gisbert | 4–6, 6–8 |
| Loss | 11–13 | Jun 1973 | Hamburg, Germany | Clay | (Spain) Manuel Orantes | (Germany) Hans-Jürgen Pohmann (Germany) Jürgen Fassbender | 6–7, 6–7, 6–7 |
| Loss | 11–14 | Jun 1973 | Eastbourne, England | Grass | (Spain) Manuel Orantes | (United States) Jim McManus (Sweden) Ove Nils Bengtson | 4–6, 6–4, 5–7 |
| Win | 12–14 | Aug 1973 | Louisville, Kentucky, US | Clay | (Spain) Manuel Orantes | (United States) Clark Graebner (Australia) John Newcombe | 0–6, 6–4, 6–3 |
| Loss | 12–15 | Aug 1973 | Indianapolis, Indiana, US | Clay | (Spain) Manuel Orantes | (South Africa) Frew McMillan (Australia) Bob Carmichael | 3–6, 4–6 |
| Win | 13–15 | Mar 1974 | São Paulo WCT, Brazil | Carpet (i) | (Italy) Adriano Panatta | (Sweden) Ove Nils Bengtson (Sweden) Björn Borg | 7-5, 3-6, 6-3 |
| Win | 14–15 | Jan 1977 | Baltimore, Maryland, US | Carpet | (Argentina) Guillermo Vilas | (Australia) Ross Case (Czechoslovakia) Jan Kodeš | 6–3, 6–7, 6–4 |
| Loss | 14–16 | Feb 1977 | Springfield, Massachusetts | Carpet | (Argentina) Guillermo Vilas | (South Africa) Frew McMillan (South Africa) Bob Hewitt | 6–7, 6–2 |
| Win | 15–16 | Mar 1977 | Nice, France | Clay | (Argentina) Guillermo Vilas | (Australia) Chris Kachel (Australia) Chris Lewis | 6–4, 6–1 |
| Loss | 15–17 | Jul 1977 | South Orange, New Jersey, US | Clay | (Argentina) Guillermo Vilas | (Australia) Colin Dibley (Poland) Wojciech Fibak | 1–6, 5–7 |
| Loss | 15–18 | Sep 1977 | Paris, France | Clay | (Romania) Ilie Năstase | (France) Jacques Thamin (France) Christophe Roger-Vasselin | 2–6, 6–4, 3–6 |
| Win | 16–18 | Sep 1977 | Aix-en-Provence, France | Clay | (Romania) Ilie Năstase | (France) Patrice Dominguez (Sweden) Rolf Norberg | 7–5, 7–6 |
| Win | 17–18 | Oct 1977 | Tehran, Iran | Clay | (Argentina) Guillermo Vilas | (South Africa) Bob Hewitt (South Africa) Frew McMillan | 1–6, 6–1, 6–4 |
| Win | 18–18 | Nov 1977 | Buenos Aires, Argentina | Clay | (Argentina) Guillermo Vilas | (Argentina) Ricardo Cano (Spain) Antonio Muñoz | 6–4, 6–0 |
| Win | 19–18 | May 1978 | Munich, Germany | Clay | (Argentina) Guillermo Vilas | (Germany) Jürgen Fassbender (Netherlands) Tom Okker | 3–6, 6–4, 7–6 |
| Loss | 19–19 | Jul 1978 | South Orange, New Jersey, US | Clay | (Argentina) Guillermo Vilas | (United States) John McEnroe (United States) Peter Fleming | 3–6, 3–6 |
| Win | 20–19 | Sep 1978 | Aix-en-Provence, France | Clay | (Argentina) Guillermo Vilas | (Czechoslovakia) Jan Kodeš (Czechoslovakia) Tomáš Šmíd | 7–6, 6–1 |
| Loss | 20–20 | Nov 1978 | Paris Bercy, France | Hard | (Argentina) Guillermo Vilas | (South Africa) Andrew Pattison (United States) Bruce Manson | 6–7, 2–6 |
| Loss | 20–21 | Jan 1979 | Hobart, Tasmania, Australia | Grass | (Argentina) Guillermo Vilas | (Australia) Bob Giltinan (Australia) Phil Dent | 6–8 |
| Loss | 20–22 | Jan 1979 | Richmond, Virginia, US | Carpet | (Argentina) Guillermo Vilas | (United States) John McEnroe (United States) Brian Gottfried | 4–6, 3–6 |
| Win | 21–22 | Mar 1979 | San José, Costa Rica | Hard | (Argentina) Guillermo Vilas | (India) Anand Amritraj (South Africa) Colin Dibley | 7–6, 6–1 |
| Loss | 21–23 | May 1979 | French Open, Paris, France | Clay | (Romania) Virginia Ruzici | (Australia) Wendy Turnbull (Australia) Bob Hewitt | 3–6, 6–2, 3–6 |
| Loss | 21–24 | Jul 1979 | Gstaad, Switzerland | Clay | (Argentina) Guillermo Vilas | (Australia) John Marks (Australia) Mark Edmondson | 3–6, 6–2, 3–6 |
| Win | 22–24 | Jul 1979 | North Conway, US | Clay | (Argentina) Guillermo Vilas | (United States) John Sadri (United States) Tim Wilkison | 6–4, 7–6 |

=== Performance timeline ===
Key
| W | F | SF | QF | #R | RR | Q# | DNQ | A | NH |

(W) winner; (F) finalist; (SF) semifinalist; (QF) quarterfinalist; (#R) rounds 4, 3, 2, 1; (RR) round-robin stage; (Q#) qualification round; (DNQ) did not qualify; (A) absent; (NH) not held; (SR) strike rate (events won / competed); (W–L) win–loss record.

| Tournament | 1965 | 1966 | 1967 | 1968 | 1969 | 1970 | 1971 | 1972 | 1973 | 1974 | 1975 | 1976 | 1977 | | 1978 | SR | W–L | Win % |
|---|---|---|---|---|---|---|---|---|---|---|---|---|---|---|---|---|---|---|
Grand Slam tournaments
| Australian Championships/Australian Open | A | A | A | A | A | A | A | A | A | A | A | A | 2R | A | 1R | 0 / 2 | 1–2 | 33.33 |
| French Championships/French Open | 3R | 3R | 3R | QF | 2R | 4R | 1R | 1R | 2R | A | A | A | A | | A | 0 / 9 | 15–9 | 62.50 |
| Wimbledon | A | 1R | 4R | 2R | 2R | 2R | 3R | 4R | A | 1R | 1R | A | A | | 1R | 0 / 10 | 11–10 | 52.38 |
| US National Championships/US Open | A | A | A | A | 2R | A | 2R | 2R | 3R | A | A | A | A | | A | 0 / 4 | 5–4 | 55.55 |
| Win–loss | 2–1 | 2–2 | 5–2 | 5–2 | 3–3 | 4–2 | 3–3 | 4–3 | 3–2 | 0–1 | 0–1 | n/a | 1–1 | | 0–2 | 0 / 25 | 32–25 | 56.14 |

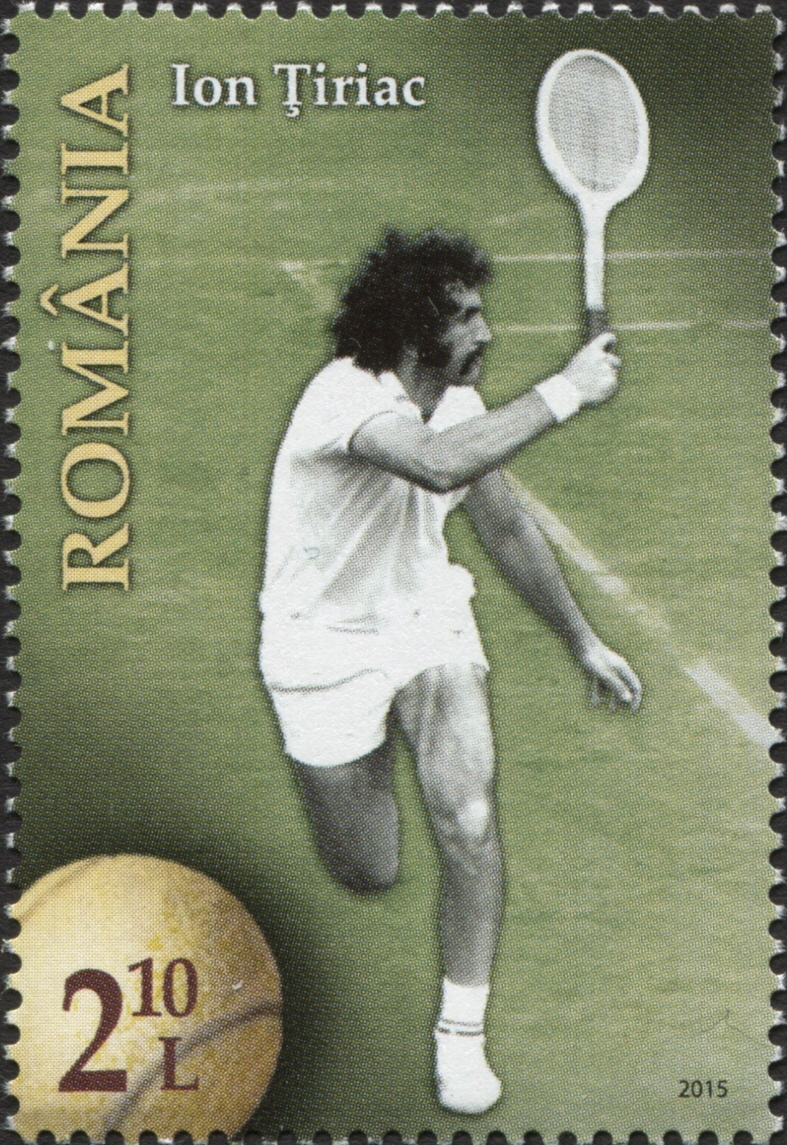

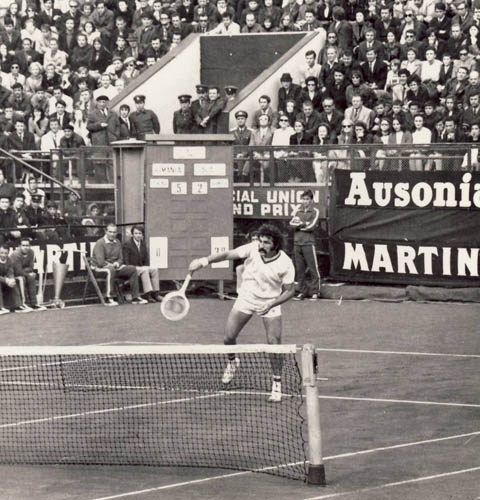

== Companies ==
- Țiriac Holdings
- ȚiriacAIR
- Allianz-Țiriac Asigurări România
- ȚiriacAuto
- Țiriac Leasing
- Tir Travel (formerly Țiriac Travel)

== See also ==
- Capital Top 300 wealthiest men in Romania

== Selected publications ==
- Țiriac, Ion; Năstase, Ilie (1972). Ar fi fost prea frumos... Editura Stadion. OCLC 895420065.
- Țiriac, Ion (1974). Victorie cu orice preț. Editura Stadion. OCLC 895420017.
