= Nina Teplyakova =

Personal information
- Native name: Нина Теплякова
- Born: November 10, 1904; Baku, Russian Empire
- Died: July 22, 1983 (aged 78); Moscow, USSR
- Resting place: Kuntsevo Cemetery
- Occupation(s): Tennis player, tennis coach
- Years active: 1922-1943

Sport
- Country: Soviet Union
- Sport: Tennis

Nina Sergeevna Teplyakova (Russian: Нина Сергеевна Теплякова; November 10, 1904 – July 22, 1983) was a Soviet dancer, tennis player, and tennis coach. She was honored as a Merited Master of Sport (1936) and Merited Coach of the USSR (1956), and was awarded the Order of the Badge of Honor (July 22, 1937). She was a nine-time USSR champion, and as a coach, she trained about 20 Masters of Sport of the USSR, including Anna Dmitrieva, Olga Morozova, and Olga Zaitseva.

== Biography ==
Nina Teplyakova, the daughter of an accountant, was introduced to tennis by Nikolai Nikolaevich Ivanov, a leading Soviet tennis player. Ivanov began courting the girl, who dreamed of a ballet career, in the resort village of Mamontovka near Moscow and persuaded her to take up tennis. In 1922, at the age of 18, she first stepped onto the court at the Moscow Tennis Championship, losing decisively in singles to Sofia Maltseva, and then also in mixed doubles with Ivanov. However, her coach, who later became Teplyakova's husband, managed to motivate her to pursue a tennis career. In 1926, at the match-tournament for the best female tennis players of the USSR, held that year instead of the All-Union Championship, Teplyakova defeated both Maltseva and the reigning champion Elena Alexandrova. This success was considered sensational, but the following year Teplyakova won all the domestic tournaments she participated in and topped the newly introduced USSR ranking of the top ten female tennis players. That same year, she also won the World Labor Spartakiad in Berlin.

In the 1930s, having already graduated from the evening ballet school of the Bolshoi Theater and performing as a dancer in the musical revue with the ensemble of Kasyan Goleizovsky's "30 Girls," Teplyakova continued to be a leader in Soviet women's tennis. After missing the 1932 season due to illness, she won the USSR Championship in singles six times in a row—a record that remains unbeaten among women to this day—and topped the All-Union women's ranking nine times (the last time in 1939). It wasn't until 1940 that she lost the title of USSR champion and the top spot in the ranking to Galina Korovina. Teplyakova's playing style was not aggressively attacking; she preferred to play from the baseline. However, she was noted for her speed around the court (she would "run around" each ball from the right) and her excellent tactical thinking and feel for the game.

In 1935, Teplyakova participated in an anti-fascist athletes' rally in Paris. In 1936, she became one of the first in the USSR to be awarded the title of "Honored Master of Sport", and in 1937, she was honored with the Order of the Badge of Honor. In 1938, during a tour of the USSR by tennis players from the Czech club "CCC," Teplyakova, after losing her first match to Prague champion Kiselova, managed to avenge the loss a few weeks later by mastering the previously unknown short shots in the USSR. She also took part in international matches with players from Turkey, Belgium, and France.

After the war began, Teplyakova completed hand-to-hand combat courses and became an instructor with the Vsevobuch. In 1942, after a long break, she won the Moscow Championship. In 1943, at the Open Championship of Moscow (where Zinaida Klochkova and Tatyana Nalimova were brought from the still-blockaded Leningrad, and Galina Korovina from Orenburg, where she had been working in a hospital), the 38-year-old Teplyakova sustained a meniscus injury that ended her playing career.

== Coaching career ==
After her retirement from playing, Nina Teplyakova became a coach, as she had planned. Among her first trainees was Elizaveta Chuvirina, who, at the age of 33, had reached the level of a first-category player. Teplyakova took Chuvirina on in 1948 and, within three years, helped her become the USSR Champion. Chuvirina later repeated this achievement three more times, and by the late 1960s, her daughter Marina, who was also trained by Teplyakova, became the USSR Champion in doubles.

Nina Teplyakova was instrumental in the success of two leading Soviet tennis players, Anna Dmitrieva and Olga Morozova. She managed to instill in Dmitrieva a playing style that was completely different from her own, encouraging her to approach the net from the beginning of each rally—a style she had "borrowed" from the famous French player Henri Cochet. Teplyakova coached Dmitrieva until she became the absolute USSR Champion at the age of 18. Another of Teplyakova's trainees, Olga Morozova, compared the playing style of one of her most renowned opponents, Chris Evert, to that of her own coach, noting that Evert had also perfected the baseline game. Among Teplyakova's other students was Svetlana Parkhomenko (Cherneva), a multiple-time USSR Champion in various categories and winner of more than ten professional doubles tournaments. In 1956, Nina Sergeevna Teplyakova was awarded the title of "Honored Coach of the USSR".

In 1955, in honor of the 50th anniversary and 35 years of sports and public life, she was awarded the badge "Excellence in Physical Culture."

Nina Teplyakova died in the summer of 1983 from a serious illness. She was buried at the Kuntsevo Cemetery in Moscow. In 2003, her name was included in the lists of the Russian Tennis Hall of Fame.

== Achievements ==
- Seven-time USSR singles champion and two-time doubles champion
- Winner of the World Labor Spartakiad (Berlin, 1927) in singles and doubles
- First RSFSR tennis champion (1927)
- Multiple-time Moscow champion in all categories, three-time absolute Moscow champion
- Coach of about 20 Masters of Sport of the USSR, including Elizaveta Chuvirina, Anna Dmitrieva, and Olga Morozova
