= Valeria Kuzmenko Titova =

Soviet tennis player

Valeria Ivanovna Kuzmenko Titova
- Native name: Валерия Ивановна Кузьменко-Титова
- Country (sports): Soviet Union
- Born: 28 February 1934; Kyiv, Ukraine, USSR
- Died: 9 October 2010 (aged 76)
- Plays: Right-handed

Singles

Grand Slam singles results
- French Open: 2R (1960)
- Wimbledon: 1R (1961)

Doubles

Grand Slam doubles results
- French Open: 1R (1960)
- Wimbledon: QF (1961)

Mixed doubles

Grand Slam mixed doubles results
- French Open: 2R (1960)
- Wimbledon: 2R (1961)

Valeria Ivanovna Kuzmenko Titova (Russian: Валерия Ивановна Кузьменко-Титова; born 28 February 1934 — 9 October 2010) was a female tennis player who competed for the Soviet Union.

She was born on February 28, 1934, in Kyiv. Pupil of coach Vladimir Balva. She was the first Soviet tennis player to participate in the French Open in 1960. She died on October 9, 2010, in the United States, where she was being treated. She was the wife of Olympic champion Soviet gymnast Yuri Titov. Member of the Russian Tennis Hall of Fame since 2007 and the Ukrainian Tennis Hall of Fame since 2015.

She played in singles at the French Open in 1960. She lost to the Australian player Jan Lehane in the Second Round.

She played in Singles at the Wimbledon in 1961. She lost to the American Donna Floyd in the First Round. Her partner in Women's Doubles, citizen Anna Dmitrieva lost in the Quarterfinals to the South African players Margaret Hunt and Lynette Hutchings. Her partner in mixed doubles Toomas Leius lost in the Second Round to the Brazilian player Carlos Fernandes and Australian Margaret Hellyer.

== Career finals ==
=== Singles (7–6) ===
Result	No.	Year	location	Surface	Opponent	Score
Loss	1.	July 1955	Moscow, Soviet Union	Clay	(Soviet Union) Larissa Preobrazhenskaya	5–7, 2–6
Win	1.	July 1956	Moscow, Soviet Union	Clay	(Soviet Union) Larissa Preobrazhenskaya	3–6, 7–5, 6–4
Win	2.	March 1958	Moscow, Soviet Union	Clay	(Soviet Union) Yevgenia Larina	6–2, 6–1
Win	3.	July 1958	Moscow, Soviet Union	Clay	(Soviet Union) Irina Ermolova	6–4, 6–2
Loss	2.	July 1959	Moscow, Soviet Union	Clay	(Soviet Union) Irina Ermolova	4–6, 6–8
Loss	3.	August 1959	Moscow, Soviet Union	Hard	(Soviet Union) Anna Dmitrieva	3–6, 1–6
Win	4.	September 1959	Warsaw, Poland	Clay	(Poland) Jadwiga Jędrzejowska	5–7, 6–2, 6–2
Win	5.	March 1960	Moscow, Soviet Union	Hard (i)	(Soviet Union) Anna Dmitrieva	6–3, 1–6, 6–2
Win	6.	July 1960	Moscow, Soviet Union	Clay	(Soviet Union) Vera Filippova	8–6, 6–2
Loss	4.	July 1959	Sopot, Poland	Clay	(Czechoslovakia) Věra Pužejová	2–6, 0–6
Win	7.	July 1961	Moscow, Soviet Union	Clay	(Soviet Union) Irina Ermolova	6–1, 6–0
Loss	5.	8 March 1964	Moscow, Soviet Union	Hard	(Soviet Union) Anna Dmitrieva	6–8, 2–6
Loss	6.	16 August 1964	Moscow, Soviet Union	Clay	(Soviet Union) Anna Dmitrieva	2–6, 2–6

=== Doubles (5–6) ===
Result	No.	Year	location	Surface	Partner	Opponents	Score
Win	1.	June 1957	Bucharest, Romania	Clay	(Soviet Union) Vera Filippova	(France) Ginette Bucaille (France) Jacqueline Kermina	2–6, 7–5, 6–4
Loss	1.	July 1958	Moscow, Soviet Union	Clay	(Soviet Union) Margarita Ryzhikova	(Soviet Union) Elizaveta Chyuvyrina (Soviet Union) Vera Filipova	4–6, 6–8
Win	2.	September 1959	Warsaw, Poland	Clay	(United Kingdom) Patricia Ward Hales	(West Germany) Eva Johannes (West Germany) Helga Schultze	6–3, 6–4
Win	3.	July 1960	Moscow, Soviet Union	Clay	(Soviet Union) Irina Ermolova	(Soviet Union) Vera Filipova (Soviet Union) Larissa Preobrazhenskaya	6–4, 6–3
Loss	2.	July 1960	Sopot, Poland	Clay	(Poland) Danuta Szmidtówna	(West Germany) Eva Johannes (Czechoslovakia) Věra Pužejová	0–6, 1–6
Loss	3.	July 1961	Sopot, Poland	Clay	(Soviet Union) Galina Baksheeva	(Soviet Union) Irina Ermolova (Soviet Union) Larissa Preobrazhenskaya	4–6, 6–3, 4–6
Loss	4.	19 August 1961	Moscow, Soviet Union	Hard	(Soviet Union) Anna Dmitrieva	(West Germany) Eva Johannes (Czechoslovakia) Věra Pužejová	6–1, 6–8, 4-6
Loss	5.	8 March 1964	Moscow, Soviet Union	Hard	(Soviet Union) Anna Dmitrieva	(Czechoslovakia) Olga Lendlová (Czechoslovakia) Jana Sonská	4–6, 6–2, 5-7
Win	4.	June 1964	Riga, Soviet Union	Clay	(Soviet Union) Larissa Preobrazhenskaya	(Soviet Union) Tiiu Kivi (Soviet Union) Tiiu Soome	7–5, 7–5
Loss	6.	16 August 1964	Moscow, Soviet Union	Hard	(Soviet Union) Anna Dmitrieva	(Czechoslovakia) Olga Lendlová (Czechoslovakia) Jana Sonská	6–3, 3–6, 5-7
Win	5.	October 1966	Alma Ata, Soviet Union	Hard (i)	(Soviet Union) Galina Baksheeva	(Soviet Union) Irina Ermolova (Soviet Union) Aleksandra Ivanova	6–2, 6–2
