= Toomas Leius =

Estonian tennis player (1941–2025)

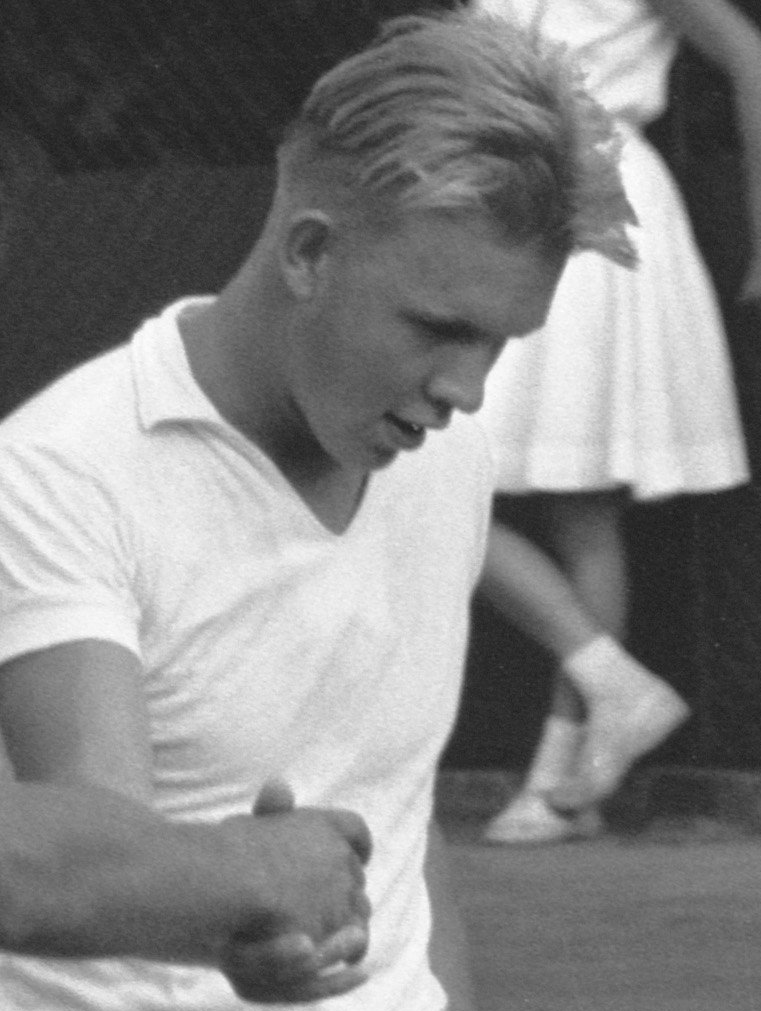
- Leius in 1959
- Country (sports): Soviet Union
- Born: 28 August 1941 Tallinn, Estonia
- Died: 7 February 2025 (aged 83)

Grand Slam singles results
- Australian Open: 3R (1969)
- French Open: QF (1965)
- Wimbledon: 3R (1960, 1963)
- US Open: 2R (1962)

Grand Slam doubles results
- Australian Open: QF (1969)
- Wimbledon: QF (1963)

Grand Slam mixed doubles results
- Australian Open: 1R (1969)
- French Open: F (1971)
- Wimbledon: 3R (1967)

Team competitions
- Davis Cup: F^{Eu} (1967, 1969, 1970)
Medal record
Representing Soviet Union
Men's Tennis
Summer Universiade
Gold medal – first place	1970 Turin	Mixed Doubles
Silver medal – second place	1965 Budapest	Men's Singles
Silver medal – second place	1965 Budapest	Men's Doubles
Silver medal – second place	1965 Budapest	Mixed Doubles
Silver medal – second place	1970 Turin	Men's Singles
Silver medal – second place	1970 Turin	Men's Doubles

Toomas Leius (28 August 1941 – 7 February 2025) was an Estonian tennis player who competed for the Soviet Union.

== Career ==
Leius was the boys' singles champion at the 1959 Wimbledon Championships. He won the Soviet Championships in 1963, 1964, 1965 and 1968. He also won the Moscow International Indoor Championships five times from 1961 to 1963, 1965, 1969. Other good performances during his career include reaching the final of the 1964 Queen's Club Championships, which he lost to Roy Emerson, and taking Rod Laver to five sets at the 1969 Heineken Open. He was a gold medalist in the mixed doubles at the 1970 Summer Universiade in Turin, with Tiiu Parmas.

His best performance in the singles draw of a Grand Slam tournament came at the 1965 French Championships, where he made the quarter-finals. He was due to face South African player Cliff Drysdale in the quarter-final but the Soviet delegation made him forfeit the match, in protest against apartheid. Leius and Winnie Shaw were mixed doubles runners-up at the 1971 French Open.

He was a regular fixture in the Soviet Davis Cup team during the 1960s and appeared in a total of 20 ties, from which he managed 23 wins, 17 of them in singles.

== Murder conviction and prison ==
On 13 May 1974, Toomas Leius strangled his wife Ene Leius (née Visnapuu) to death after finding her in bed with another man. He was sentenced to eight years in prison and was released after serving five years for good behavior.

== Later life and death ==
Leius worked as a tennis coach after leaving prison and spent some time as captain of the Estonia Fed Cup team.

Leius died on 7 February 2025, at the age of 83.

== Grand Slam finals ==
=== Mixed doubles: 1 (0–1) ===
Result	Year	Championship	Surface	Partner	Opponents	Score
Loss	1971	French Open	Clay	(United Kingdom) Winnie Shaw	(France) Françoise Dürr (France) Jean-Claude Barclay	2–6, 4–6

== Awards ==
- Estonian Sportspersonality of the year: 1961, 1963, 1965

Awards
Preceded by Hanno Selg	Estonian Sportspersonality of the Year; 1961	Succeeded by Paul Keres
Preceded by Paul Keres	Estonian Sportspersonality of the Year; 1963	Succeeded by Ants Antson
Preceded by Ants Antson	Estonian Sportspersonality of the Year; 1965	Succeeded by Mart Vilt
