= Anna Dmitrieva =

Soviet tennis player and Russian sports commentator (1940–2024)

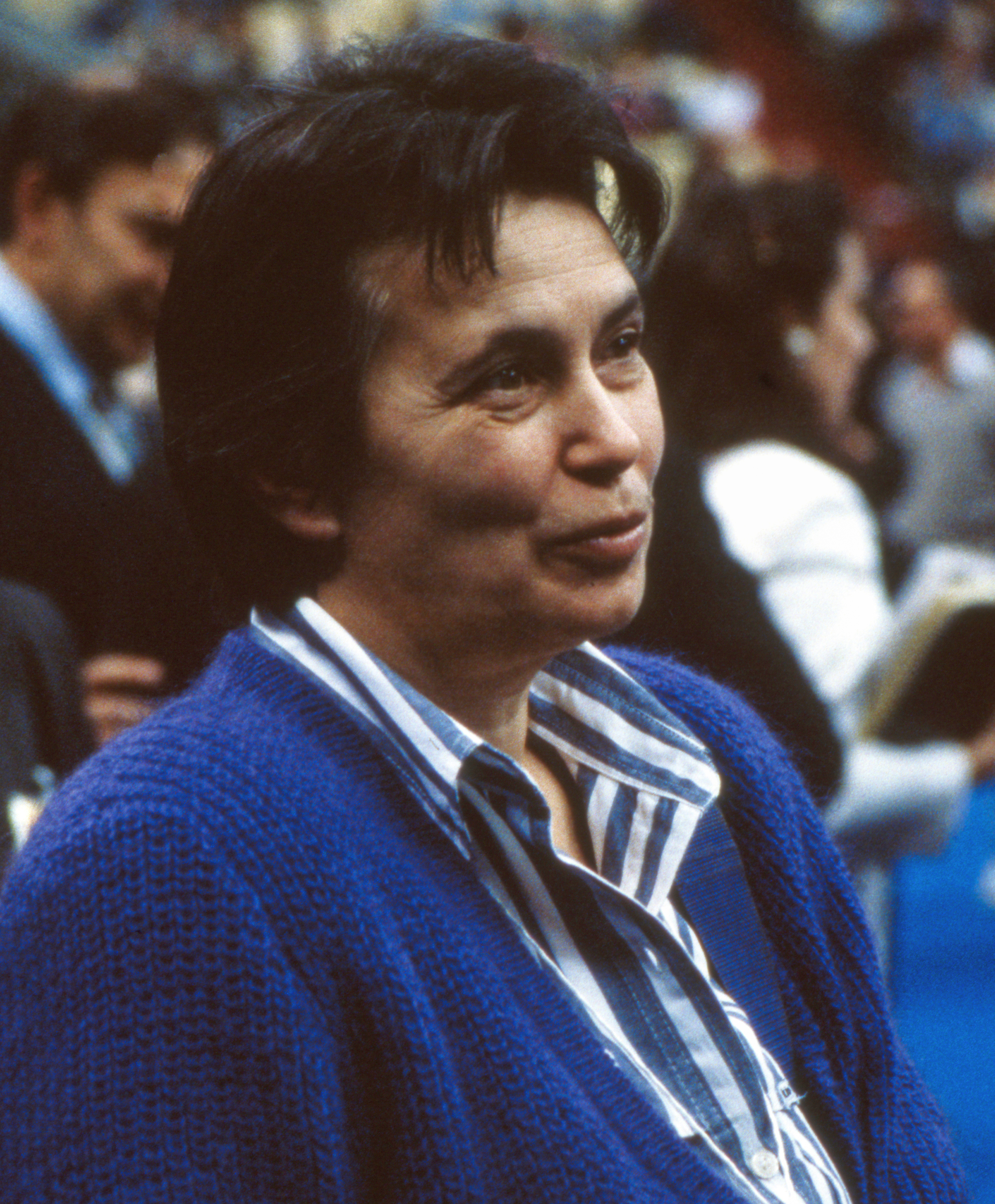
- Dmitrieva in 1990
- Full name: Anna Vladimirovna Dmitrieva
- Native name: Анна Дмитриева
- Country (sports): Soviet Union
- Born: 10 December 1940 Moscow, Russian SFSR, USSR
- Died: 24 June 2024 (aged 83)
- Retired: 1973
- Plays: Left-handed (one-handed backhand)

Singles
- Career titles: 12 ITF

Grand Slam singles results
- French Open: 4R (1967)
- Wimbledon: 4R (1960)
- US Open: 4R (1962)
- Wimbledon Junior: F (1958)

Doubles
- Career titles: 13 ITF

Grand Slam doubles results
- French Open: QF (1968)
- Wimbledon: SF (1963)

Grand Slam mixed doubles results
- Wimbledon: QF (1967)

Anna Vladimirovna Dmitrieva (Russian: Анна Владимировна Дми́триева; 10 December 1940 — 24 June 2024) was a tennis player who competed for the Soviet Union, as well as a sports commentator.

== Biography ==
Anna Dmitrieva started playing tennis at the age of 12. In less than a year she had won the Moscow junior championships as a member of the Dynamo team, and the next year she also became Moscow junior singles champion. At the age of 16 she was allowed to play at senior tournaments, and in a year she became champion of Moscow in singles, women's doubles and mixed doubles.

In 1958, when the USSR joined the International Tennis Federation, Dmitrieva became a member of the first Soviet delegation at the Wimbledon Championships. She reached the final of the junior girls' tournament.

In 1958–1967, Dmitrieva won 18 titles in the Soviet Championships: five times in singles, nine in women's doubles and four times in mixed doubles. In 1959, 1961, 1962 and 1964 she won the championships in all three categories.

Dmitrieva also won the open championships of Czechoslovakia and Hungary (1962), Uganda (1963), and Yugoslavia (1966). She also won the women's tournament at the Queen's Club in 1963 and the Wimbledon Ladies Plate in 1965. She won a number of amateur tournaments in Africa from 1964 to 1968 and the Games of the New Emerging Forces (GANEFO) in Jakarta in 1963.

At the Grand Slam tournaments, her greatest success was reaching the Wimbledon doubles semis in 1963 with Judy Tegart; they lost to the eventual champions Maria Bueno and Darlene Hard. At the Wimbledon Championships, Dmitrieva also reached the quarterfinals twice in ladies' doubles (in 1960 and 1967) and in mixed doubles in 1967 when she and Alexander Metreveli played the longest game in the tournament's history against Bueno and Ken Fletcher. Dmitrieva also played in the French Open doubles quarterfinals in 1968.

After finishing her player's career in the late 1960s, Dmitrieva worked as a tennis coach for four years and then became a sports journalist and commentator for Soviet TV and radio. She started as a commentator on TV in 1976, with Alex Metreveli. After 1993, she worked with NTV, Match TV, which she left because the channel stopped covering tennis tournaments, and Eurosport.

Dmitrieva died on 24 June 2024, at the age of 83.

== ILTF Career finals ==
=== Singles (12–14) ===
Result	No.	Date	Tournament	Surface	Opponent	Score
Win	1.	9 August 1959	Moscow, Soviet Union	Hard	(Soviet Union) Valeria Kuzmenko-Titova	6–3, 6–1
Loss	2.	1 March 1960	Moscow, Soviet Union	Hard (i)	(Soviet Union) Valeria Kuzmenko-Titova	3–6, 6–1, 2–6
Win	3.	7 August 1960	Moscow, Soviet Union	Hard	(Czechoslovakia) Jirina Elgrová	6–2 6–4
Win	4.	2 July 1961	Budapest, Hungary	Clay	(Hungary) Zsuzsa Körmöczy	6–3 6–4
Loss	5.	19 August 1961	Moscow, Soviet Union	Clay	(Czechoslovakia) Věra Suková	7–5, 1–6, 1–6
Win	6.	11 March 1962	Moscow, Soviet Union	Hard (i)	(Italy) Lea Pericoli	6–2, 7–5
Loss	7.	16 July 1962	Budapest, Hungary	Clay	(Hungary) Zsuzsa Körmöczy	1–6, 6–4, 4–6
Loss	8.	1 August 1962	Prague, Czechoslovakia	Clay	(United Kingdom) Elizabeth Starkie	3–6, 0–6
Loss	9.	20 August 1962	Moscow, Soviet Union	Clay	(Australia) Jan Lehane	3–6, 3–6
Win	10.	2 February 1963	Moscow, Soviet Union	Hard (i)	(Soviet Union) Irina Ermolova	6–4, 6–3
Loss	11.	10 June 1963	Prague, Czechoslovakia	Clay	(Czechoslovakia) Věra Suková	1–6, 6–4, 4–6
Win	12.	8 March 1964	Moscow, Soviet Union	Hard	(Soviet Union) Valeria Kuzmenko-Titova	8–6, 6–2
Win	13.	18 May 1964	Algiers, Algeria	Clay	(France) Françoise Dürr	6–3, 6–2
Win	14.	16 August 1964	Moscow, Soviet Union	Clay	(Soviet Union) Valeria Kuzmenko-Titova	6–2 6–2
Loss	15.	7 February 1965	Helsinki, Finland	Hard (i)	(United Kingdom) Elizabeth Starkie	2–6, 6–1, 3–6
Loss	16.	14 August 1966	Moscow, Soviet Union	Clay	(United Kingdom) Ann Jones	1–6, 3–6
Win	17.	18 September 1966	Belgrade, Yugoslavia	Clay	(Czechoslovakia) Alena Palmeová	6–2, 6–4
Loss	18.	22 January 1967	Moscow, Soviet Union	Hard (i)	(Soviet Union) Olga Morozova	7–9, 6–8
Loss	19.	19 February 1967	Moscow, Soviet Union	Hard (i)	(Soviet Union) Galina Baksheeva	2–6, 8–10
Win	20.	4 March 1967	Moscow, Soviet Union	Hard (i)	(Soviet Union) Galina Baksheeva	9–7, 6–4
Loss	21.	19 March 1967	Alexandria, Egypt	Clay	(West Germany) Helga Schultze	6–4, 1–6, 6–8
Loss	22.	27 September 1967	Tbilisi, Soviet Union	Clay	(Soviet Union) Olga Morozova	5–7, 6–4, 1–6
Loss	23.	7 January 1968	Moscow, Soviet Union	Hard (i)	(Soviet Union) Olga Morozova	9–7, 1–6, 8–10
Win	24.	17 March 1968	Alexandria, Egypt	Clay	(United Kingdom) Robin Blakelock	6–0, 6–3
Win	25.	6 January 1972	Minsk, Soviet Union	Hard (i)	(Soviet Union) Marina Chuvirina	6–4, 6–2
Loss	26.	27 February 1972	Moscow, Soviet Union	Hard (i)	(Soviet Union) Eugenia Birioukova	4–6, 3–6

=== Doubles (15–7) ===
Result	No.	Date	Tournament	Surface	Partner	Opponents	Score
Loss	1.	January 1960	Calcutta, India	Hard	(Soviet Union) Irina Ermolova	(Australia) Margaret Hellyer (United States) Mimi Arnold	5–7, 2–6
Win	2.	January 1960	New Delhi, India	Hard	(Soviet Union) Irina Ermolova	(Australia) Margaret Hellyer (United States) Mimi Arnold	4–6, 7–5, 6–0
Win	3.	January 1960	Indore, India	Hard	(Soviet Union) Irina Ermolova	(India) Dechu Appaiah (India) Leela Panjabi	7–5, 6–1
Win	4.	1 March 1960	Moscow, Soviet Union	Hard (i)	(Soviet Union) Irina Ermolova	(Soviet Union) Vera Filippova (Soviet Union) Larissa Preobrazhenskaya	6–2, 6–2
Loss	5.	8 March 1960	Moscow, Soviet Union	Hard	(Soviet Union) Irina Ermolova	(Czechoslovakia) Věra Suková (Soviet Union) Velve Tamm	6–8, 4–6
Win	6.	7 August 1960	Moscow, Soviet Union	Hard	(Soviet Union) Irina Ermolova	(Soviet Union) Vera Filippova (Soviet Union) Larissa Preobrazhenskaya	6–4, 6–4
Win	7.	5 March 1961	Moscow, Soviet Union	Hard (i)	(Soviet Union) Irina Ermolova	(Soviet Union) Vera Filippova (Soviet Union) Larissa Preobrazhenskaya	6–0, 6–2
Loss	8.	19 August 1961	Moscow, Soviet Union	Hard	(Soviet Union) Valeria Kuzmenko-Titova	(West Germany) Eva Johannes (Czechoslovakia) Věra Suková	6–1, 6–8, 4–6
Win	9.	22 July 1962	Budapest, Hungary	Clay	(Czechoslovakia) Jitka Volavková	(Hungary) Klara Bardoczy (Hungary) Zsuzsa Körmöczy	8–6, 6–2
Win	10.	1 August 1962	Prague, Czechoslovakia	Clay	(Czechoslovakia) Jana Volková	(Czechoslovakia) Vlasta Vopičková (Czechoslovakia) Jiřina Michlová	7–5, 6–2
Win	11.	10 June 1963	Prague, Czechoslovakia	Clay	(Soviet Union) Irina Ermolova	(Czechoslovakia) Zdena Stachová (Czechoslovakia) Vlasta Vopičková	6–4, 5–7, 6–1
Win	12.	22 June 1963	London, United Kingdom	Grass	(Australia) Judy Tegart	(United Kingdom) Angela Mortimer (Mexico) Yola Ramírez	6–1 6–0
Loss	13.	8 March 1964	Moscow, Soviet Union	Hard	(Soviet Union) Valeria Kuzmenko-Titova	(Czechoslovakia) Olga Lendlová (Czechoslovakia) Jana Sonska	4–6, 6–2, 5–7
Loss	14.	16 August 1964	Moscow, Soviet Union	Hard	(Soviet Union) Valeria Kuzmenko-Titova	(Czechoslovakia) Olga Lendlová (Czechoslovakia) Jana Sonska	6–3, 3–6, 5–7
Win	15.	7 February 1965	Helsinki, Finland	Hard (i)	(Sweden) Gudrun Rosin	(United Kingdom) Robin Blakelock (United Kingdom) Elizabeth Starkie	6–0, 6–4
Win	16.	7 March 1965	Moscow, Soviet Union	Hard (i)	(Soviet Union) Galina Baksheeva	(Czechoslovakia) Vlasta Vopičková (West Germany) Helga Schultze	6–4, 7–9, 6–2
Loss	17.	14 August 1966	Moscow, Soviet Union	Hard	(Australia) Judy Tegart	(United Kingdom) Ann Jones (Netherlands) Betty Stöve	4–6, 6–2, 3–6
Win	18.	19 February 1967	Moscow, Soviet Union	Hard (i)	(Soviet Union) Galina Baksheeva	(Soviet Union) Tatiana Chalko (Soviet Union) Olga Morozova	6–2, 6–1
Win	19.	4 March 1967	Moscow, Soviet Union	Hard (i)	(Soviet Union) Galina Baksheeva	(Soviet Union) Tatiana Chalko (Soviet Union) Olga Morozova	6–3, 6–1
Loss	20.	4 February 1968	Copenhagen, Denmark	Hard (i)	(Soviet Union) Galina Baksheeva	(United Kingdom) Virginia Wade (United Kingdom) Joyce Williams	4–6, 3–6
Win	21.	25 February 1968	Moscow, Soviet Union	Hard	(Soviet Union) Galina Baksheeva	(Soviet Union) Rauza Islanova (Soviet Union) Olga Morozova	6–2, 7–5
Win	22.	6 January 1972	Minsk, Soviet Union	Hard (i)	(Soviet Union) Marina Chuvirina	(Soviet Union) Larisa Novoshinskaya (Soviet Union) Anna Yeremeyeva	6–3, 3–6, 6–1

== Junior Grand Slam finals ==
=== Girls' singles: 1 (1-0) ===
Result	Year	Tournament	Surface	Opponent	Score
Runner-up	1958	Wimbledon	Grass	(United States) Sally Moore	2–6, 4–6
