= 1930 men's and women's ILTF tennis circuit =

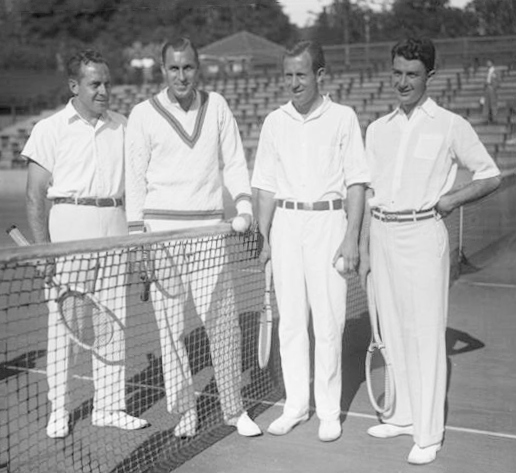
- The 1930 runner-up American Davis Cup team, from left: Francis Hunter (US Indoors champion, absent), Bill Tilden (Wimbledon champion and French finalist), and Wilmer Allison with John Van Ryn (Wimbledon doubles champions, US finalists)

Details
- Duration: December 23, 1929 – December 22, 1930

Achievements (singles)
- Most titles: (United States) Bill Tilden (19)

The year 1930 in tennis was a complex mixture of mainly amateur tournaments composed of international, invitational, national, exhibition, team (city leagues, country leagues, international knock-out tournaments) events and joined by a marginal Pro Tour encompassing only British, German, French and American Pro events.

At the end of the Pro season the champion title was awarded, which in this year was given to the US Pro Champion. Vincent Richards held the title at the end of the year. The professionals were trainers in a major part those who accepted money for coaching. There were a few occasional professional against amateur challenges as well held in team competition format. The amateur events were almost all co-educated thus the majority included a mixed title contest. American Bill Tilden debuted this year on the European riviera scene winning almost every tournament he entered and took a dozen titles partnering his protégé Wilbur Coen. The women's most successful players were Elizabeth Ryan in the European international championships and Helen Wills Moody, who won the two most prestigious tournaments in Europe, the French Championships and Wimbledon. Australian Jack Crawford also left his mark on the Continental tennis scene.

The most important team cups were the Wightman Cup for women and the Davis Cup (called the International Lawn Tennis Challenge) and the Mitre Cup (South American version of the Davis Cup) for men. The 1930 Wightman Cup was its eighth edition and was organized by the United States Lawn Tennis Association between the teams of Great Britain and the United States. The 1930 International Lawn Tennis Challenge was its 25th edition and was organized by the International Tennis Federation. The tournament was split into the American and European zones. The winner of each sub-zone played in the Inter-Zonal Final. Twenty-four teams entered the Europe Zone (including India, Australia and Japan), while four participated in the America Zone. The United States defeated Mexico in the America Zone, but then lost to France in the Challenge Round, giving France their fourth straight title. The final was played at Stade Roland Garros in Paris, France, on July 25–27.

== Key ==
Pro Majors
National championships
International championships
Team events
Pro tour

- Q = Qualifier
- WC = Wild card
- LL = Lucky loser

- Alt = Alternate
- SE = Special Exempt
- def. = defeated

- w/o = Walkover
- ret = Retired
- d = Defaulted

This list includes men and women international tournaments (where at least several different nations were represented), main (annual) national championships, professional tour events and the Davis, Mitre, Wightman Cup

== Pre-tournament season ==
- In an inter-club challenge between the cities of Menton and Bordighera the former club was victorious with a match score of 10-4.
- Helen Wills married American banker Fred Moody and announced she'd use her married name Mrs. Helen Moody in tournaments.

== January ==
- On the January 3rd meeting of International Tennis Federation several Davis Cup-related issues were addressed including the suspension of the Romanian Tennis Federation as there were two rival tennis governing bodies existing in the country, the general usage of Dunlop balls as the official balls of the Cup and most importantly the dividing of the European Zone into North-European and South-European subzones.
- E. Angel became the British junior covered courts champion. Miss Jay was crowned the ladies' champion.
- VV. Jacobs became the American junior covered courts champion. M. Hecht was crowned the ladies' champion.
- The Australia Davis Cup team trials were held.
- Hamburg beat Bremen 22-8.
- Queen's Club beat Helsingfors L.T.C. 4-3 in Finland.

Month	Event	Men		Women		Mixed	
Month	Event	Champions	Runner-up	Champions	Runner-up	Champions	Runner-up
December 23–29	Championships of Hyères; Hyères, France	(Weimar Republic) Philip Buss; 7–5, 4–6, 6–2, 4–6, 6–2	(France) Henri Reynaud	(France) Doris Metaxa; 6–3, 3–6, 6–2	(France) Julie Vlasto		
December 23–29	Championships of Hyères; Hyères, France	(France) A. Ducreux / (France) Reynaud; 6–3, 1–6, 6–3, 8–6.	(Weimar Republic) Buss / (Switzerland) Wuarin	N/A	N/A	(France) Reynaud / (France) R. Vlasto; 8–6, 8–6	(Weimar Republic) Buss / (France) J. Vlasto
December 30-January 5	Métropole Club de Cannes Beausite; Cannes, France	(France) Paul Barrelet de Ricou; 8–6, 6–2, 6–4	(Republic of Ireland) George Lyttleton-Rogers	(United States) Elizabeth Ryan; 6–3, 1–6, 6–3	(France) Sylvie Jung Henrotin		
December 30-January 5	Métropole Club de Cannes Beausite; Cannes, France	(Switzerland) Aeschlimann / (Argentina) Magrane; 4–6, 10-8, 6–2	(France) Ricou / (United Kingdom) Lysaght	(United States) Ryan / (United Kingdom) Satterthwaite; 6–3, 6–5 suspended	(France) Jung / (South Africa) Petchell	(United Kingdom) Cholmondeley / (United States) Ryan w/o	Scovel / (France) Jung
January 6–12	Monte Carlo Country Club; Monte Carlo, Monaco	(United States) Bill Tilden; 7–5, 6–2, 6–8, 6–0	(Republic of Ireland) George Lyttleton-Rogers	(United States) Elizabeth Ryan; 6–1, 6–4	(United Kingdom) Phyllis Satterthwaite		
January 6–12	Monte Carlo Country Club; Monte Carlo, Monaco	(United States) Tilden / (United Kingdom) Kingsley; 6–0, 6–4	(Finland) Grahn / (Republic of Ireland) Rogers	N/A	N/A	N/A	N/A
January	Belgian Covered Courts tournament Belgium	(Belgium) André Ewbank; 6–2, 6–1, 6–3	(Belgium) Leopold de Borman	N/A	N/A		
January	Belgian Covered Courts tournament Belgium	(Belgium) Ewbank / (Belgium) de Borman; 7–5, 8–6, 4–6, 6–8, 9–7	J. Borin/Belle	N/A	N/A	Laloux / (Belgium) Dupont; 4–6, 6–3, 6–2	Coumick / Mrs. Garry
January	Coupe de Noël; Paris, France	(France) Jean Borotra; 6–4, 6–2, 4–6, 6–1	(United States) Bill Tilden	(France) Simone Barbier; 8–6, 5–7, 6–4	(France) Ida Adamoff		
January	Coupe de Noël; Paris, France	(France) Borotra / (France) Glasser; 8–6, 6–4, 11–9	(Chile) D Torralva-Ponsa / (Chile) L Torralva-Ponsa	(France) Desloges / (France) Conquet; 6–4, 6–4	(France) Barbier / (France) Bordes	(France) Borotra / (France) Bordes; 6–1, 9–7	(France) Boussus / (France) Rosambert
January	Canadian Covered Courts tournament Canada	(United States) Gilbert Hall; N/A	N/A	N/A	N/A		
January	Canadian Covered Courts tournament Canada	(United States) Hall / (United States) Mercur	(United States) Lott / (Canada) Rainville	N/A	N/A	N/A	N/A
January	Belgian International Covered Courts tournament Belgium	(France) Antoine Gentien; 6–2, 6–3, 6–0	(France) Roger George	(Belgium) Josane Sigart; 7–5, 6–4	(France) Leila Claude-Anet		
January	Belgian International Covered Courts tournament Belgium	(France) Gentien / (France) Glasser; 6–2, 6–3	(France) Thurneyssen / (France) George	(France) Anet / (Weimar Republic) Krahwinkel; 6–4, 6–8, 7–5	(Belgium) Sigart / Rosenberg	N/A	N/A
January	French Covered Courts tournament Paris, France	(France) Jean Borotra; 6–2, 6–4, 6–1	(France) Christian Boussus	(Weimar Republic) Paula von Reznicek; 6–2, 6–2	(France) Marguerite Bordes		
January	French Covered Courts tournament Paris, France	(France) Borotra / (France) Glasser; 8–6, 10-8, 6–2	(France) de Buzelet / (France) Contanson	N/A	N/A	(France) Borotra / (France) Bordes; 9-11, 7–5, 9–7	(France) Boussus / (France) Barbier
January	Rheims Covered Courts tournament Rheims, France	(France) Christian Boussus; 8–6, 6–1	(France) Max Combemale	Schumann; 2–6, 6–4, 8–6,	Lais		
January 13–19	Bristol Cup; Beaulieu-sur-Mer, France	(Czechoslovakia) Karel Koželuh; 6–3, 6–3, 6–4	(Weimar Republic) Roman Najuch				
January 15-	1930 Australian Championships; Sydney, Australia; Men's singles – Women's singles	(Australia) Edgar Moon; 6–3, 6–1, 6–3	(Australia) Harry Hopman	(Australia) Daphne Akhurst Cozens; 10–8, 2–6, 7–5	(Australia) Sylvia Lance Harper		
January 15-	1930 Australian Championships; Sydney, Australia; Men's singles – Women's singles	(Australia) Crawford / (Australia) Hopman; 8–6, 6–1, 2–6, 6–3	(Australia) Fitchett / (Australia) Hawkes	(Australia) Hood / (Australia) Molesworth; 6–3, 0–6, 7–5	(Australia) Cox / (Australia) Harper	(Australia) Hopman / (Australia) Hall; 11–9, 3–6, 6–3	(Australia) Crawford / (Australia) Cox
January 20–26	New Courts de Cannes Championship; Cannes, France	(United States) Bill Tilden; 6–1, 6–4, 6–1	(Italy) Giorgio de Stefani	(United States) Elizabeth Ryan; 6–2, 2–6, 6–0	(Italy) Lucia Valerio		
January 20–26	New Courts de Cannes Championship; Cannes, France	(United States) Tilden / (United Kingdom) Kingsley; 6–1, 6–2, 6–1	(Denmark) Worm / (Republic of Ireland) Rogers	(France) Jung / (United Kingdom) Ridley; 6–2, 7–5	(United States) Ryan / (United Kingdom) Satterthwaite	(United States) Tilden / (Weimar Republic) Aussem; 6–3, 6–4	(United Kingdom) Kingsley / (United States) Ryan

== February ==
- The Davis Cup draws were held on February 3 in Paris.
- W. G. Robertson became the New Zealander junior champion. He was crowned the doubles champion as well alongside M. Ferkins who also won the New Zealand Plate.

Month	Event	Men		Women		Mixed	
Month	Event	Champions	Runner-up	Champions	Runner-up	Champions	Runner-up
February -1	All-India national championships Allahabad, India	(British Raj) E. Vivian Bobb; 6–3, 5–7, 6–2, 6–3	(British Raj) Dip Narain Kapoor	(British Raj) Jenny Sandison; 6–3, 6–0	(British Raj) Lena McKenna		
February -1	All-India national championships Allahabad, India	(British Raj) Edwards / (British Raj) Michelmore; 6–4, 3–6, 6–3, 6–1	(British Raj) Kapoor / (British Raj) Ahad Hussain	(British Raj) McKenna / Jordan; 6–3, 6–4	(British Raj) Sandison / Fowler	(British Raj) Edwards / (British Raj) Sandison; 6–3, 6–4	(British Raj) Bobb / (British Raj) McKenna
February 8 (men) -February 1 (women)	American covered courts tournaments Manhattan, United States (men); Longwood, Florida, United States (women)	(United States) Francis Hunter; 6–1, 6–2, 6–2	(United States) Julius Seligson	(United States) Mianne Palfrey; 7–5, 6–2	(United States) Marion Jessup		
February 8 (men) -February 1 (women)	American covered courts tournaments Manhattan, United States (men); Longwood, Florida, United States (women)	(United States) Cutler / (United States) Rockafellow; 6–2, 6–3, 2–6, 6–4	(United States) Coggeshall / (United States) Murphy	(United States) Wightman / (United States) Palfrey; 6–3, 6–3	(United States) Sigourney / (United States) Whiting	(United States) Harte / (United States) Blake; 3–6, 6–1, 7–5	(United States) Murphy / (United States) Palfrey
January -February 1	New Zealand Lawn Tennis Championships 1929-1930; Christchurch, New Zealand	(New Zealand) Charles Angas; 6–1, 3–6, 6–4	(New Zealand) Donald G. France	(New Zealand) Dulcie Nicholls; N/A	W.J. Melody		
January -February 1	New Zealand Lawn Tennis Championships 1929-1930; Christchurch, New Zealand	(New Zealand) Malfroy / (New Zealand) France; N/A	(New Zealand) Wilson / (New Zealand) Stedman	(New Zealand) Andrews / (New Zealand) Wake; N/A	(New Zealand) Thompson / (New Zealand) Adams	(New Zealand) Wilson / (New Zealand) Thompson	(New Zealand) A E Sandrall/ (New Zealand) Marjorie Macfarlane
January 27–February 2	Gallia L.T.C. de Cannes Championship; Cannes, France	(United States) Bill Tilden; 6–0, 6–2, 6–0	(Austria) Hermann von Artens	(United States) Elizabeth Ryan; 6–3, 6–2	(France) Sylvie Jung Henrotin		
January 27–February 2	Gallia L.T.C. de Cannes Championship; Cannes, France	(France) Cochet / (France) Brugnon w/o	(United States) Tilden / (United Kingdom) Kingsley	(United States) Ryan/ (France) Jung; 6–4, 6–2	(United Kingdom) Ridley / (United Kingdom) Harvey	(United States) Tilden / (Weimar Republic) Aussem; 6–3, 7–5	(Denmark) Worm / (United Kingdom) Ridley
February -8	New South Wales Championships; Sydney, Australia	(Australia) Jack Cummings; 6–1, 6–0, 7–5	(Australia) Edgar Moon	(Australia) Louie Bickerton; 6–3, 6–4	(Australia) Emily Hood		
February -8	New South Wales Championships; Sydney, Australia	(Australia) Crawford / (Australia) Hopman; 6–4, 1–6, 6–1, 6–2	(Australia) Cummings / (Australia) Moon	(Australia) Akhurst / (Australia) Marjorie Cox; 6–3, 3–6, 9–7	(Australia) Bickerton / (Australia) Harper	(Australia) Crawford / (Australia) Crawford; 3–6, 6–3, 6–2	(Australia) Hopman / (Australia) Eleanor Mary Hall
February 3–9	Carlton L.T.C. de Cannes Championship; Cannes, France	(Italy) Giorgio de Stefani; 6–2, 4–6, 6–2, 6–3	(Austria) Hermann von Artens	(United States) Elizabeth Ryan w/o	(France) Sylvie Jung Henrotin		
February 3–9	Carlton L.T.C. de Cannes Championship; Cannes, France	(France) Cochet / (France) Brugnon; 3–6, 6–3, 6–3, 6–2	(Denmark) Worm / (France) Ricou	(United States) Ryan / (France) Jung; 6–4, 6–1	(Weimar Republic) Aussem / (Italy) Valerio	(France) Cochet / (United States) Ryan; 12-10, 6–3	(United States) Tilden / (Weimar Republic) Aussem
February 10–16	South of France Championship; Nice, France	(United States) Bill Tilden; 4–6, 8–6, 6–1, 5–7, 6–0	(Republic of Ireland) George Lyttleton-Rogers	(Weimar Republic) Cilly Aussem; 6–0, 6–2	(United States) Carolyn Swartz		
February 10–16	South of France Championship; Nice, France	(United States) Coen / (United States) Tilden; 6–0, 3–6, 7–5, 6–3	(Republic of Ireland) Rogers / (Denmark) Worm	Radcliffe / Platt; 6–3, 6–3	(United Kingdom) Satterthwaite / (United Kingdom) Ridley	(United Kingdom) Peters / (United Kingdom) Ridley (United States) Coen / (Weimar Republic) Aussem unplayed	
~February 17–23	Philippine National Tennis Championship; Manila, Philippines	(Empire of Japan) Ryosuki Nunoi vs. (Philippines) Lope Yngayo or (Empire of Japan) Sato		N/A	N/A		
February 17–23	Hotel Bristol Championships; Beaulieu-sur-Mer, France	(United Kingdom) Harry Lee; 3–6, 6–3, 6–3, 3–6, 7–5	(United Kingdom) Bunny Austin	(United Kingdom) Joan Ridley; 6–3, 0–6, 6–4	(United Kingdom) Violet Owen		
February 17–23	Hotel Bristol Championships; Beaulieu-sur-Mer, France	(United States) Coen / (United States) Tilden	(Weimar Republic) Prenn / (Weimar Republic) Kleinschroth	(United Kingdom) Satterthwaite / (United Kingdom) Ridley	(United Kingdom) Owen / (South Africa) Petchell	(United Kingdom) Hughes / (United Kingdom) Owen; N/A	N/A
February	St. Moritz Covered Courts Championship; St. Moritz, Switzerland	(Denmark) Fritz Gleerup; N/A	(Belgium) André Ewbank	(France) Ida Adamoff; N/A	(France) Arlette Neufeld		
February	St. Moritz Covered Courts Championship; St. Moritz, Switzerland	(France) Gentien / (France) Glasser; N/A	(Denmark) Gleerup / (Denmark) Rasmussen	N/A	N/A	N/A	(Hungary) Takáts / (France) Culbert
February	German Covered Courts Championships; Bremen, Weimar Republic	(Sweden) Curt Östberg; 6–4, 3–6, 4–6, 6–4, 6–3	(Weimar Republic) Friedrich Frenz	(Weimar Republic) Hilde Krahwinkel; 7–5, 6–0	(Weimar Republic) Ellen Hoffmann		
February	German Covered Courts Championships; Bremen, Weimar Republic	(Weimar Republic) Dessart / (Weimar Republic) Frenz; 10-8, 6–4, 6–3	(Sweden) Östberg / Mackenthum	(Weimar Republic) Krahwinkel / (Weimar Republic) Peitz; 6–0, 6–2	(United Kingdom) Hemmant / (United Kingdom) Strawson	(United Kingdom) Austin / (Weimar Republic) Rost; 11–9, 6–1	(Sweden) Östberg / (Sweden) Fick

== March ==
- Geneve defeated Paris 10-9.
- Rhine valley beat the Blau-Weiss Club of Berlin 8-3.
- Bremer T. V. von 1896 annihilated Gothenburg five to love.
- Romania Davis Cup team member László Dörner turned pro after the Hungarian international covered courts tournaments.
- At the March 23 meeting of the International Tennis Federation, the ITF rejected the idea of the USLTA about organizing the first "Open" tournament in the United States.^{[d]}
- Mexico gave a walkover to Cuba in the first round of the Davis Cup American Zone.

Month	Event	Men		Women		Mixed	
Month	Event	Champions	Runner-up	Champions	Runner-up	Champions	Runner-up
March	Algerian Championships; Oran, French Algeria	Harang; 4–6, 6–1, 7–5	Stumpf	Dublanc; 6–3, 5–7, 6–3	Béranga		
February 24-March 3	Monaco Cups; Monte-Carlo, Monaco	(United States) Bill Tilden; 6–4, 6–4, 6–1	(United Kingdom) Bunny Austin	(Weimar Republic) Cilly Aussem; 6–1, 6–4	(France) Simonne Mathieu		
February 24-March 3	Monaco Cups; Monte-Carlo, Monaco	(Italy) Morpurgo / (United States) Coen; 6–2, 3–6, 6–4, 6–4	(Republic of Ireland) Rogers / (Empire of Japan) Abe	(France) Metaxa / (France) Barbier; 8–6, 1–6, 7–5	(Weimar Republic) Aussem / (United Kingdom) Satterthwaite	(France) de Buzelet / (France) Metaxa; 12-14, 6–2, 2-0 ret.	(United Kingdom) Hughes / (United Kingdom) Ridley
February 24-March 3	Monaco Cups; Monte-Carlo, Monaco	Butler Trophy (United States) Coen / (United States) Tilden def. (United Kingdom) Kingsley / (United Kingdom) Austin; 6–2, 1–6, 9–7, 6–3		Beaumont Trophy (France) Mathieu / (France) Barbier def. (France) Metaxa / (France) Rosambert; 6–1, 8–6			
March 5–9	Hungarian international covered courts tournaments Budapest, Hungary	(Hungary) Tibor Krepuska; 6–3, 6–2, 3–6, 1–6, 6–3	(Hungary) Emil Gabrovitz	(Hungary) Magda Baumgarten; 6–2, 6–3	(Hungary) Mrs. Paksy		
March 5–9	Hungarian international covered courts tournaments Budapest, Hungary	(Hungary) Bánó / (Hungary) Krepuska; 4–6, 6–4, 6–0, 6–2	(Hungary) Gabrovitz / (Hungary) Péteri	N/A	N/A	(Romania) (Hungary) Dörner / (Hungary) Baumgarten	(Hungary) Bánó / (Hungary) Mrs. Paksy
March 3–9	French Riviera Championships and Nations Cup; Menton, France	(United States) Bill Tilden; 10-8, 7–5, 3–6, 4–6, 6–1	(France) Jacques Brugnon	(Weimar Republic) Cilly Aussem; 9–7, 6–2	(France) Simonne Mathieu		
March 3–9	French Riviera Championships and Nations Cup; Menton, France	(United States) Coen / (United States) Tilden; 6–3, 6–3, 4–6, 6–3	(Empire of Japan) Abe / (Switzerland) Aeschlimann	(Weimar Republic) Aussem / (United States) Ryan; 6–1, 6–0	(Weimar Republic) von Reznicek / (France) Mathieu	(United Kingdom) Hughes / (United States) Ryan; 6–2, 6–0	(Denmark) Worm / (United Kingdom) Satterthwaite
March 3–9	French Riviera Championships and Nations Cup; Menton, France	Nations Cup (United States) Tilden / (United States) Ryan def. (United Kingdom) Lee / (United Kingdom) Owen; 6–0, 64					
March 15	Southern Pro; Palm Beach, United States	(United States) Vincent Richards straight sets, 7–5	(United States) Paul Heston				
March 10–16	Parc Imperial L.T.C. de Nice; Nice, France	(United States) Bill Tilden; 6–2, 6–2, 6–3	(Republic of Ireland) George Lyttleton-Rogers	(France) Simonne Mathieu; 6–4, 7–5	(United States) Elizabeth Ryan		
March 10–16	Parc Imperial L.T.C. de Nice; Nice, France	(United States) Coen / (United States) Tilden; 2–6, 6–4, 6–3, 7–9, 6–1	(Empire of Japan) Sato / (Empire of Japan) Harada	N/A	N/A	N/A	N/A
March 10–16	Bordighera Championships; Bordighera, Italy	(United Kingdom) Pat Hughes vs. (United Kingdom) Harry Lee; N/A		(Italy) Lucia Valerio vs. (United Kingdom) Phyllis Satterthwaite; N/A			
March 10–16	Bordighera Championships; Bordighera, Italy	(United Kingdom) Hughes / (United Kingdom) Lee vs. (Denmark) Worm / (Hungary) Kehrling; N/A		N/A	N/A	(United Kingdom) Hughes / (United Kingdom) Phyllis Satterthwaite vs. (Denmark) Worm / (Italy) Valerio; N/A	
March 17–23	Côte d'Azur Championships; Cannes, France	(United States) Bill Tilden; 6–3, 6–3, 6–4	(Italy) Giorgio de Stefani	(Weimar Republic) Cilly Aussem; 6–0, 6–0	(United Kingdom) Violet Owen		
March 17–23	Côte d'Azur Championships; Cannes, France	(United States) Coen / (United States) Tilden; 6–4, 6–0, 1–6, 6–3	(Empire of Japan) Sato / (Empire of Japan) Harada	(Weimar Republic) Aussem / (United States) Ryan; 6–0, 6–1	(Weimar Republic) von Reznicek / (United Kingdom) Thomas	(Empire of Japan) Harada / (United States) Ryan; 6–3, 3–6, 6–1	(United States) Tilden / (Weimar Republic) Aussem
March 17–23	Italian riviera Championships; Sanremo, Italy	(Denmark) Erik Worm; 3–6, 6–2, 6–4, 3–6, 6–3	(United Kingdom) Pat Hughes	(United Kingdom) Phyllis Satterthwaite; 6–0, 6–1	(Austria) Hilde Eisenmenger		
March 17–23	Italian riviera Championships; Sanremo, Italy	(Denmark) Worm / (United Kingdom) Hughes; 6–2, 6–3, 6–0	(Weimar Republic) Buss / (Weimar Republic) Oppenheimer	(Italy) Perelli / (United Kingdom) Satterthwaite; 6–3, 6–0	(Weimar Republic) Schomburgk / Springer	(Hungary) Kehrling / (United Kingdom) Satterthwaite; 3–6, 8–6, 6–0	(Denmark) Worm / (Italy) Perelli
March	London Hard Courts Championships; London, United Kingdom	(Empire of Japan) Yoshiro Ohta; 4–6, 6–2, 6–2, 3–6, 7–5	(South Africa) Pat Spence	(United Kingdom) Phyllis Mudford; 6–3, 7–5	(United Kingdom) Joan Fry		
March	London Hard Courts Championships; London, United Kingdom	(United Kingdom) Olliff / (United Kingdom) Sharpe; 1–6, 4–6, 8–6, 9–7, 6–4	(United Kingdom) Perry / (United Kingdom) Wilde	(United Kingdom) Dix / (United Kingdom) Fry; 7–5, 6–4	(United Kingdom) Pittman / (United Kingdom) Nuthall	(South Africa) Spence / (United Kingdom) Nuthall; 6–4, 1–6, 6–1	(United Kingdom) Harris / (United Kingdom) Fry
March 24–31	Beausite – L. T. C. de Cannes Championship; Cannes, France	(United States) Wilbur Coen vs. (United States) Bill Tilden unplayed, prize divided		(United States) Elizabeth Ryan vs. (Weimar Republic) Paula von Reznicek unplayed, prize divided			
March 24–31	Beausite – L. T. C. de Cannes Championship; Cannes, France	(United States) Coen / (United States) Tilden; 6–3, 6–4, 6–2	(Monaco) Gallepe / (Republic of Ireland) Rogers	(United States) Jacobs / (United States) Ryan; 4–6, 7–5, 6–4	(United Kingdom) Owen / (Spain) de Álvarez	(United States) Tilden / (Weimar Republic) Aussem; 6–1, 7–5	(United States) Ryan / (Empire of Japan) Abe

== April ==
Month	Event	Men		Women		Mixed	
Month	Event	Champions	Runner-up	Champions	Runner-up	Champions	Runner-up
March 31-April 7	St. Raphaël T.C. Championships; Saint-Raphaël, France	(United States) Bill Tilden; 6–1, 6–0, 6–2	(Italy) Giorgio de Stefani	(United States) Elizabeth Ryan; 6–0, 6–1	(Czechoslovakia) Korotvickova		
March 31-April 7	St. Raphaël T.C. Championships; Saint-Raphaël, France	(United States) Tilden / (United States) Coen; 6–2, 3–6, 6–3, 6–8, 6–4	(Empire of Japan) Abe / (Empire of Japan) Sato	(Weimar Republic) Aussem / (United States) Ryan; 6–3, 6–0	(France) Sineux / Springer	(United States) Tilden / (Weimar Republic) Aussem; 7–5, 6–3	(United States) Coen / (United States) Ryan
April 7–14	L.T.C. Miramar de Juan-les-Pins Championship; Juan-les-Pins, France	(United States) Bill Tilden; 4–6, 6–1, 6–2, 6–3	(United States) Wilbur Coen	(United States) Elizabeth Ryan; 6–2, 7–5	(Weimar Republic) Cilly Aussem		
April 7–14	L.T.C. Miramar de Juan-les-Pins Championship; Juan-les-Pins, France	(United States) Tilden / (United States) Coen; 6–2, 6–4, 6–3	(Monaco) Gallepe / (Monaco) Renard	(Weimar Republic) Aussem / (United States) Ryan; 6–2, 6–3	(Switzerland) Payot / (United Kingdom) Thomas	(United States) Coen / (United States) Ryan; 1–6, 6–3, 6–4	(United States) Tilden / (Weimar Republic) Aussem
April 14–20	Beaulieu Championship; Beaulieu-sur-Mer, France	(United States) Bill Tilden w/o	(United States) Wilbur Coen	(United Kingdom) Phyllis Satterthwaite; 2–6, 8–6, 6–4	(United States) Helen Jacobs		
April 14–20	Beaulieu Championship; Beaulieu-sur-Mer, France	(United States) Tilden / (United States) Coen; 6–3, 6–3, 7–5	(France) Lesueur / Magaloff	(United States) Jacobs / (United States) Ryan; 7–5, 5–7, 6–4	(United Kingdom) Satterthwaite / (Belgium) Sigart	(United States) Tilden / (United States) Ryan; 6–1, 6–3	(United States) Coen / (United States) Jacobs
April 12-	South African Championships; Johannesburg, South Africa	(South Africa) Louis Raymond; 6–2, 5–7, 6–3, 6–4	(South Africa) Colin Robbins	(South Africa) Billie Tapscott; 7–5, 6–2	(South Africa) Vera Everett		
April 12-	South African Championships; Johannesburg, South Africa	(South Africa) Kirby / (South Africa) Condon; 7–5, 6–1, 10-8	(South Africa) Raymond / (South Africa) Malcolm			(South Africa) Farquharson / (South Africa) Heine; 0–6, 6–2, 6–2	(South Africa) Raymond / (South Africa) Everett
April 13–21	Swedish Indoors Championships; Stockholm, Sweden	(Sweden) Curt Östberg; 3 sets to 1	(Sweden) Sune Malmström	(Sweden) Sigrid Fick; 2 sets to 0	(Sweden) Maggie Lindberg		
April 13–21	Swedish Indoors Championships; Stockholm, Sweden	(Sweden) Östberg / (Sweden) Ramberg; 3 sets to 1	(Sweden) Söderström / (Sweden) Garell	(Sweden) Fick / (Sweden) Aquilon; 2 sets to 0	(Sweden) Lindberg / (Sweden) Ramberg	(Sweden) Östberg/ (Sweden) Fick; 2 sets to 0	(Sweden) H. Ramberg / (Sweden) Ramberg
April 21-	Greek National Championships; Athens, Greece	(Greece) Orestis Garangiotis; N/A	N/A	(Greece) Lenos; N/A	N/A		
April 21–27	Beausoleil Cup; Monte-Carlo, Monaco	(United States) Bill Tilden; 6–1, 6–3, 6–3	(France) Jean Lesueur	(Spain) Lilí Álvarez; 3–6, 6–2, 7–5	(Belgium) Josane Sigart		
April 21–27	Beausoleil Cup; Monte-Carlo, Monaco	(United States) Tilden / (United States) Coen; 6–4, 6–3, 6–3	(France) Goldschmidt / (France) Terrier	N/A	N/A	(United States) Tilden / (Spain) de Álvarez; 6–1, 6–3	(United Kingdom) Hillyard / (United Kingdom) Satterthwaite
April	Bermuda Championships; Bermuda	(United States) Herbert Bowman; 8–6, 6–3, 6–4	(United States) Bruce Barnes	N/A	N/A		
April	Bermuda Championships; Bermuda	(United States) Bell / (United States) Barnes; 6–3, 6–2, 6–3	(United States) Bowman / (United States) Doeg	N/A	N/A	N/A	N/A
April	Danish Championships; Copenhagen, Denmark	(Denmark) Einer Ulrich; 6–4, 12-10, 8–6	(Denmark) Povl Henriksen	(Denmark) Else Støckel; 4–6, 6–1, 6–0	(Denmark) Daur		
April	Danish Championships; Copenhagen, Denmark	(Denmark) Gleerup / (Denmark) Henriksen; 6–2, 6–2, 6–2	(Denmark) Jacobsen / (Denmark) Plougmann	N/A; N/A	N/A	N/A; N/A	N/A
April	Montreux tournament Montreux, Switzerland	(Australia) Jack Crawford; 6–4, 3–6, 7–5, 6–3	(France) Emmanuel du Plaix	(Weimar Republic) Cilly Aussem w/o	(United States) Elizabeth Ryan		
April	Montreux tournament Montreux, Switzerland	(Australia) Crawford / (Australia) Moon vs. (Australia) Hopman / (Australia) Willard; 7–5, 3–6, 3–6, 9–7, 8-8 suspended		(Weimar Republic) Aussem / (United States) Ryan; 6–1, 7–5	(Switzerland) Payot / (Weimar Republic) Neppach	(Australia) Crawford / (Weimar Republic) Aussem; 6–2, 4–6, 7–5	(Denmark) Worm / (United States) Ryan
April	Toulon Championship; Toulon, France	(France) Jacques Brugnon; 7–5, 6–2, 6–1	(France) Pierre Goldschmidt	(France) Marjollet; 6–4, 6–4	Martin		
April	Toulon Championship; Toulon, France	(France) Reynaud / (France) Brugnon; 8–6, 6–2	(France) Goldschmid / Blanc	N/A	N/A	(France) Brugnon / Martin; 6–4, 1–6, 6–3	(France) Goldschmid / Franké
April	Biarritz Championship; Biarritz, France	(France) Raymond Rodel; 6–1, 6–3, 6–4	(Republic of Ireland) George Lyttleton-Rogers	(France) Simonne Mathieu; 6–4, 6–2	(France) Jeanne Peyré		
April	Biarritz Championship; Biarritz, France	(France) Cochet / (France) Landry; 2–6, 6–2, 6–1, 1–6, 6–2	(France) Féret / (Republic of Ireland) Rogers	N/A	N/A	George / (France) Le Besnerais; 2–6, 7–5, 6–3	(France) Cochet / (France) Le Conte
April	New Orleans Country Club Invitational Tournament; New Orleans, United States	(United States) John Doeg; 6–4, 6–3, 1–6, 4–6, 6–4	(United States) John Van Ryn	N/A	N/A		
April	New Orleans Country Club Invitational Tournament; New Orleans, United States	(United States) Lott / (United States) Doeg; 6–0, 6–2, 6–2	(United States) Van Ryn / (United States) Cram	N/A	N/A	N/A	N/A

== May ==
Month	Event	Men		Women		Mixed	
Month	Event	Champions	Runner-up	Champions	Runner-up	Champions	Runner-up
May 2–4; May 2–4; April 19–22; April 24–26; May 3–6; May 2–4; May 2–4; May 2–5	Davis Cup Europe First Round; Budapest, Kingdom of Hungary; Zürich, Switzerland; Athens, Greece; London, England; Dublin, Ireland; Belgrade, Yugoslavia; Antwerp, Belgium; Warsaw, Poland	First Round winners Japan 4–0; Australia 5–0; India 3–2; Great Britain 3–2; Ireland 4–1; Yugoslavia 5–0; Spain 4–1; Poland 3–2	First Round losers Hungary; Switzerland; Greece; Germany; Monaco; Sweden; Belgium; Romania				
May -5	Italian Championships; Milan, Italy	(United States) Bill Tilden; 6–1, 6–1, 6–2	(Italy) Umberto De Morpurgo	(Spain) Lilí Álvarez; 3–6, 8–6, 6–0	(Italy) Lucia Valerio		
May 5–12	Austrian International Championships; Vienna, Austria	(United States) Bill Tilden; 6–2, 8–6, 6–4	(Austria) Franz-Wilhelm Matejka	(Weimar Republic) Cilly Aussem; 6–2, 6–4	(Weimar Republic) Toni Schomburgk		
May 5–12	Austrian International Championships; Vienna, Austria	(United States) Tilden / (Austria) Salm; 4–6, 7–5, 7–5, 5–7, 6–3	(Weimar Republic) Prenn / (Weimar Republic) Kleinschroth	(Weimar Republic) Aussem / (Weimar Republic) Schomburgk; 6–1, 6–2	(Hungary) Mrs. Paksy / (Hungary) Mrs. Schréder	(United States) Tilden / (Weimar Republic) Aussem; 6–3, 6–4	(Hungary) Kehrling / (Hungary) Mrs. Schréder
May -15	Wiesbaden International Championships; Wiesbaden, Weimar Republic	(Weimar Republic) Otto Froitzheim w/o	(France) Pierre Henri Landry	N/A	N/A		
May -15	Wiesbaden International Championships; Wiesbaden, Weimar Republic	(Weimar Republic) Buss / (Denmark) Worm; 6–4, 6–2	(Weimar Republic) Froitzheim / (Weimar Republic) Rahe	N/A	N/A	(Denmark) Worm / (Weimar Republic) Buss; 8–6, 6–2	(Norway) Nielsen / (Denmark) Støckel
May ~16	Irish National Championships; Dublin, Ireland	(Republic of Ireland) Wilde; 6–0, 6–3, 6–1	(Republic of Ireland) Tottenham	(Republic of Ireland) Hilda Wallis; 6–2, 12-10	(Republic of Ireland) Rosetta Phoebe Blair-White		
May 15–17	Davis Cup America Zone first round Philadelphia, United States	First Round winners United States 5–0	First Round losers Canada				
May 9–20	Davis Cup Second Round; Prague, Czechoslovakia Zagreb, Yugoslavia; Amsterdam, Netherlands; Dublin, Ireland; Rome, Italy; Oslo, Norway; London, England; Torquay, England	Second Round winners Czechoslovakia 3–2; Spain 5–0; Netherlands 4–1; Australia 4–1; Italy 5–0; Austria 5–0; Japan 5–0; Great Britain 5–0	Second Round losers Denmark Yugoslavia; Finland; Ireland; Egypt; Norway; India; Poland				
May 22–24	Davis Cup America Zone Final; Chevy Chase, Maryland, United States	Final winners United States 5–0	Final losers Mexico				
May	Budapest International Championships; Budapest, Hungary	(Hungary) Béla von Kehrling; 6–3, 6–1, 7–5	(Czechoslovakia) Jiří Novotný	(Weimar Republic) Toni Schomburgk; 6–2, 6–4	(Czechoslovakia) (Weimar Republic) Grete Deutsch		
May	Budapest International Championships; Budapest, Hungary	(Czechoslovakia) Soyka / (Hungary) László Klein vs. (Hungary) Aschner / (Hungary) Leiner unplayed		(Hungary) Mrs. Schréder / (Hungary) Mrs. Paksy; 5–7, 7–5, 6–4	(Hungary) Baumgarten / (Weimar Republic) Schomburgk	(Hungary) Kehrling / (Weimar Republic) Schomburgk; 6–4, 6–4	(Austria) Kinzl / (Hungary) Mrs. Schréder
May	British Hard Court Championships; Bournemouth, United Kingdom	(United Kingdom) Harry Lee; 6–3, 2–6, 6–4, 6–4	(United Kingdom) Eric Peters	N/A	N/A		
May	British Hard Court Championships; Bournemouth, United Kingdom	(United Kingdom) Austin / (United Kingdom) Olliff; 6–4, 8–6, 7–5	(United Kingdom) Eames / (United Kingdom) Wheatcroft	N/A	N/A	(United Kingdom) Kingsley / (United Kingdom) Fry; 6–0, 3–6, 6–4	(United Kingdom) Gregory / (United Kingdom) Godfree
May	Coupes des Étrangers; Oran, French Algeria	(France) Emanuelle du Plaix; 6–3, 8–6	(Italy) Placido Gaslini	N/A	N/A		
May	Surrey Grass Court Championships; Surbiton, United Kingdom	(Empire of Japan) Yoshiro Ohta; 6–3, 4–6, 6–3	(United Kingdom) Fred Perry	(British Raj) Jenny Sandison; 6–3, 5–7, 4–6	(United Kingdom) Betty Nuthall		
May	Campionato Partenopeo; Naples, Italy	(Italy) Clemente Serventi	N/A	(Italy) Gabriella Malenchini	N/A		
May	Campionato Partenopeo; Naples, Italy	(Italy) G. De Martino / (Italy) J. De Martino	N/A	(Italy) Malenchini / (Italy) Perelli	N/A	(Italy) d’Avalos / (Italy) Perelli	N/A

== June ==
- Belgium beat Finland in a non-official Davis Cup match in Brussels.
- The British amateurs defeated the British pros in the Chapel Allerton Club.
- Hungary lost to Austria with a score of 6–2 in a non-official Davis Cup match in Szombathely.
- On the 25th anniversary of the Deutscher Eishockey Gesellschaft Club of Prague it organized a ladies' only tennis event inviting several nations and many local clubs. Those present were the Weimar Republic, Austria, Hungary and Poland, while the Czech clubs were LTC Praha, D.E.H.G., I.C.L.F.K. and the host club among others. Altogether 16 teams and 48 women players competed.
- Kleinlogel became the German junior champion after beating Ernst. Sander was crowned the girls' champion after eliminating Horn in the final.
- Hamburg beat Helsinki four to one.
- The All England Club instated a dress code for women to wear pantyhose under the skirt after Helen Jacobs appeared barelegged on the center court in the Wightman Cup.

Month	Event	Men		Women		Mixed	
Month	Event	Champions	Runner-up	Champions	Runner-up	Champions	Runner-up
May 19 – June 1	1930 French Hard Court Championships; Auteuil, Paris, France; Men's singles – Women's singles	(France) Henri Cochet; 3–6, 8–6, 6–3, 6–1	(United States) Bill Tilden	(United States) Helen Wills Moody; 6–2, 6–1	(United States) Helen Jacobs		
May 19 – June 1	1930 French Hard Court Championships; Auteuil, Paris, France; Men's singles – Women's singles	(France) Cochet / (France) Brugnon; 6–3, 9–7, 6–3	(Australia) Hopman / (Australia) Willard	(United States) Moody / (United States) Jacobs; 6–3, 6–1	(France) Barbier / (France) Mathieu	(United States) Tilden / (Weimar Republic) Aussem; 6–4, 6–4	(France) Cochet / (United Kingdom) Bennett
May 30-June 9	Davis Cup Europe Zone Quarterfinals; Vienna, Austria; Eastbourne, England; Barcelona, Spain; Scheveningen, Netherlands	QF winners Italy 3–2; Australia 4-1; Japan 4-1; Czechoslovakia 3–2	QF losers Austria; Great Britain; Spain; Netherlands				
June 2–9	Berlin Championships; Berlin, Weimar Republic	(United States) Bill Tilden; 7–5, 6–8, 1–6, 7–5, N/A	(Weimar Republic) Daniel Prenn	(Weimar Republic) Cilly Aussem; 4–6, 8–6, 6–1	(Weimar Republic) Hilde Krahwinkel		
June 2–9	Berlin Championships; Berlin, Weimar Republic	(United States) Tilden / (Denmark) Worm; 7–5, 6–3, 6–3	(Weimar Republic) Kleinschroth / (Weimar Republic) Prenn	(Weimar Republic) Aussem / (Weimar Republic) Schomburgk; N/A	(France) Neufeld / (France) Adamoff	(United States) Tilden / (Weimar Republic) Aussem; 6–3, 6–1	(Hungary) Kehrling / (Weimar Republic) Friedleben
June 2-11	Belgian International Championship; Brussels, Belgium	(France) Jean Borotra; 4–6, 6–3, 6–4, 4–6, 8–6	(France) Henri Cochet	(France) Simonne Mathieu; N/A	(United Kingdom) Elsa Haylock		
June 2-11	Belgian International Championship; Brussels, Belgium	(United Kingdom) Peters / (United Kingdom) Lester; N/A	(Egypt) Zahar / (Egypt) Grandguillot	N/A	N/A	(France) Borotra / (Belgium) Sigart; N/A	(United Kingdom) Peters / (United Kingdom) Ridley
June 2–9	Bucharest International Championship; Bucharest, Romania	(Socialist Federal Republic of Yugoslavia) Franjo Šefer; 2–6, 3–6, 7–5, 6–3, 6–0	(Romania) Ghica Poulieff	(Czechoslovakia) Korotvickova	(Romania) Lenke Zizovits		
June 2–9	Bucharest International Championship; Bucharest, Romania	(Romania) Lupu / (Romania) Roman vs. (Romania) Poulieff / Krupensky; N/A		(Hungary) Mrs. Göncz / (Romania) Zizovits; 6–2, 6–1	(Romania) Caracostea / Schlosser	(Romania) Poulieff / (Romania) Golescu; 6–3, 6–1	(Socialist Federal Republic of Yugoslavia) Balás / (Hungary) Mrs. Göncz
June 9–14	Tri-State Tennis Tournament; Cincinnati, United States	(United States) Frank Shields; 6-2, 6-4, 3-6, 2-6, 6-1	(United States) Emmett Pare	(United States) Clara Louise Zinke; 6-2, 6-4	(United States) Ruth Oexman		
June 13–15	Czechoslovak Championships; Prague, Czechoslovakia	(Czechoslovakia) Josef Malacek four sets	(Socialist Federal Republic of Yugoslavia) Franjo Šefer	N/A	N/A		
June 13–15	Czechoslovak Championships; Prague, Czechoslovakia	(Czechoslovakia) Novotný / (Czechoslovakia) Marsalek three sets	(Czechoslovakia) Malacek / Rodzianko	N/A	N/A	(Czechoslovakia) Koželuh / (Hungary) Mrs.Deutch; N/A	(Czechoslovakia) Malacek / (Czechoslovakia) Fröhlichova
June 12–13	Wightman Cup; Wimbledon, United Kingdom			(United Kingdom) Great Britain 4–3	United States		
June 14–16	Davis Cup Europe Zone Semifinals; Milan, Italy; Prague, Czechoslovakia	SF winners Italy 3–2; Japan 3-2	SF losers Australia; Czechoslovakia				
June 19	Damen Cup of Deutscher Eishockey Gesellschaft; Prague, Czechoslovakia			Weimar Republic 3–1	Hungary		
June	Spanish Championships; Barcelona, Spain	(Spain) Enrique Maier; 6–3, 6–4, 6–3	(Spain) Francisco Sindreu	(Spain) María Lerena de Morales; N/A	N/A		
June	Spanish Championships; Barcelona, Spain	(Spain) Maier / (Spain) Flaquer; 1–6, 7–5, 6–3, 6–2	(Spain) Sindreu / (Spain) Tejada	(Spain) de Morales / (Spain) Torras; N/A	N/A	(Spain) Sindreu / (Spain) Marnet; N/A	N/A
June 18–22	French Pro Championship; Paris, France; Singles	(Czechoslovakia) Karel Koželuh; N/A	(Republic of Ireland) Albert Burke				
June 15–26	Singapore International Championships; Singapore, Straits Settlements	(Straits Settlements) (Republic of China (1912–1949)) Lim Bong Soo; 6–4, 6–2	N. E. Wise				
June 15–26	Singapore International Championships; Singapore, Straits Settlements	(Empire of Japan) Shoyo Matsukawa / (Empire of Japan) Kawajiri; 1–6, 6–4, 6–4	(Malayan Union) Kleinman / (United Kingdom) Aitken				
June	Queen's Club Championships; London, United Kingdom	(United States) Wilmer Allison; 6–4, 8–6	(United States) Gregory Mangin	N/A	N/A		
June	Queen's Club Championships; London, United Kingdom	(United States) Lott / (United States) Doeg; 12-14, 6–3, 6–4, 6–4	(United States) Van Ryn / (United States) Allison	N/A	N/A	N/A	N/A
June	Swiss National Championships; Switzerland	(Switzerland) Charles Aeschlimann; 6–4, 1–6, 6–2, 6–2	(Switzerland) Maurice Férrier	(Switzerland) Lolette Payot; 6–3, 6–2	Fehlmann		
June	Swiss National Championships; Switzerland	(Switzerland) de Blonay / (Switzerland) Aeschlimann; 6–2, 2–6, 7–5, 6–2	(Switzerland) Wuarin / (Switzerland) Férrier	(Switzerland) Payot / Fehlmann; 6–2, 6–3	Steinfeld / Schardt	(Switzerland) Férrier / (Switzerland) Payot; 6–3, 7–5	(Switzerland) Aeschlimann / Fehlmann
June	Austrian National Championships; Austria	(Austria) Willy Winterstein; N/A	(Austria) Haberl	(Austria) Lisl Herbst; 6–4, 6–2	(Austria) Hilde Eisenmenger		
June	Luzern International Championships; Lucerne	(France) Emanuelle du Plaix; 6–3, 6–0, 6–3	(Switzerland) Charles Aeschlimann	(United States) Elizabeth Ryan; 6–2, 6–3	(Weimar Republic) Ilse Friedleben		
June	Luzern International Championships; Lucerne	Magaloff / (Switzerland) Aeschlimann; 6–4, 6–4, 6–4	(France) du Plaix / (Switzerland) Chiesa	(Switzerland) Schäublin / (Denmark) Støckel; 6–4, 7–5	(Weimar Republic) Friedleben / (Weimar Republic) Sander	(Switzerland) Aeschlimann / Fehlmann; 12-10, 6–2	(France) du Plaix / (Weimar Republic) Sander
June	Kent Championships; Beckenham, United Kingdom	(United Kingdom) Bunny Austin; 6–2, 2–6, 6–4, 6–2	(United Kingdom) Harry Lee	(British Raj) Jenny Sandison; 6–2, 4–6, 6–4	(United Kingdom) Ann Owen		
June	Gelb-Weiss T.C. International Championships; Berlin, Weimar Republic	(Weimar Republic) Daniel Prenn; 6–0, 6–2, 6–l	(Weimar Republic) Siedhof	(Weimar Republic) Nelly Neppach; 6–2, 6–0	Köhne		
June	Gelb-Weiss T.C. International Championships; Berlin, Weimar Republic	(Weimar Republic) Prenn / (Weimar Republic) Kleinschroth; 6–2, 7–5	(Weimar Republic) Schwenker / Knüppel	Kuhlmann / Karnatz; 13-11, 5–7 ret.	(Weimar Republic) Neppach / (Weimar Republic) Uhl	(Weimar Republic) Prenn / (Weimar Republic) Neppach; 4–6, 6–2, 6–2	(Weimar Republic) Kleinschroth / (Weimar Republic) Rost

== July ==
- D.S. Macquisten became the Canadian junior champion.
- In the Davis Cup Inter-Zonal Zone final Giorgio de Stefani of Italy and Wilmer Allison of the United States set the current record of the most match points saved in a match with de Stefani losing after failing to convert 18 match balls.
- The Polish Tennis Association excluded Wanda Dubieńska.
- Adam Baworowski became the Austrian junior champion.
- Helen Wills Moody announced she'd skip the 1931 Wimbledon Championships.
- Albert Canet, Olympic doubles bronze medalist for France and contemporary president of the Fédération Française de Tennis died at the age of 52.
- The Four Musketeers defended their Davis Cup title for the third time.
- World Hard Court Championships doubles semifinalist Jenő Zsigmondy died.

Month	Event	Men		Women		Mixed	
Month	Event	Champions	Runner-up	Champions	Runner-up	Champions	Runner-up
July	Kraków tournament Kraków, Poland	(Czechoslovakia) Vojtěch Vodička; N/A	(Poland) Stolarow	N/A	N/A		
July	Kraków tournament Kraków, Poland	(Poland) M. Stolarow / (Poland) J. Stolarow; 6–2, 6–3, 6–l	(Hungary) Gabrowitz / (Hungary) Zichy	N/A	N/A	N/A	N/A
June 23-July 7	1930 Wimbledon Championships; London, United Kingdom; Men's singles – Women's singles	(United States) Bill Tilden; 6–3, 9–7, 6–4	(United States) Wilmer Allison, Jr.	(United States) Helen Wills Moody; 6–2, 6–2	(United States) Elizabeth Ryan	All England Plate (France) Emanuelle du Plaix def. (New Zealand) Cam Malfroy; 6–1, 9–7	
June 23-July 7	1930 Wimbledon Championships; London, United Kingdom; Men's singles – Women's singles	(United States) Allison / (United States) van Ryn; 6–3, 6–3, 6–2	(United States) Doeg / (United States) Lott	(United States) Moody / (United States) Ryan; 6–2, 9–7	(United Kingdom) Cross / (United States) Palfrey	(Australia) Crawford / (United States) Ryan; 6–1, 6–3	(Weimar Republic) Prenn / (Weimar Republic) Krahwinkel
July 3–9	Katowice Tournament; Katowice, Poland	(Poland) Stolarow; N/A		(Poland) Jadwiga Jedrzejowska; N/A	(Poland) Gertruda Volkmer		
July 3–9	Katowice Tournament; Katowice, Poland	(Poland) M. Stolarow / J. Stolarow; 5 sets	(Hungary) Gabrowitz / (Hungary) Zichy	N/A	N/A	N/A	N/A
July 8–13	Dutch International Championships; Noordwijk, Netherlands	(United States) Bill Tilden; 8–6, 6–8, 6–3, 6–4	(Czechoslovakia) Roderich Menzel	N/A	N/A		
July 8–13	Dutch International Championships; Noordwijk, Netherlands	(United States) Tilden / (Weimar Republic) Prenn; 6–1, 6–2, 7–5	(Netherlands) Kool / (Netherlands) Timmer	N/A	N/A	(Czechoslovakia) Menzel / (Netherlands) Canters; 6–3, 6–l	(Netherlands) Timmer / (Denmark) Støckel
July 11–13	Davis Cup Europe Zone Final; Prague, Czechoslovakia	Final winners Italy 3–2	Final losers Japan				
July 14–20	Grand Hotel Panhans Championships; Semmering, Austria	(Czechoslovakia) Roderich Menzel; 6–1, 6–2, 6–3	(Netherlands) Hendrik Timmer	(United States) Elizabeth Ryan; 6–2, 6–0	(Weimar Republic) Toni Schomburgk		
July 14–20	Grand Hotel Panhans Championships; Semmering, Austria	(United States) Bell / (Austria) Artens; N/A	(Czechoslovakia) Rohrer / (Czechoslovakia) Menzel	(United States) Ryan / (Weimar Republic) Neppach; N/A	(Weimar Republic) Schomburgk / (Weimar Republic) von Ellisen	(United Kingdom) Hughes / (United States) Ryan; N/A	(United States) Bell / (Weimar Republic) Neppach
July 18–20	Davis Cup Inter-Zonal Zone Final; Paris, France	Final winners United States 4–1	Final losers Italy				
July -20	American National Clay Court Championship; Kansas City, United States	(United States) Bryan Grant; 6–2, 4–6, 6–2, 6–4	(United States) Wilbur Coen				
July -20	American National Clay Court Championship; Kansas City, United States	(United States) Mercur / (United States) Hall; 6–3, 7–5, 6–2	(United States) Brown / (United States) Coggeshall				
July 22–24; N/A; N/A; N/A (ladies)	Various non-official Davis Cup-regulation matches Mariánské Lázně, Czechoslovakia; Bournemouth, England; Antwerp, Belgium; Deauville, France	Winning teams Sudeten Germans 3–2; Australia 5–3; France 18-3; United Kingdom 9–3	Losing teams Hungary; Great Britain; Belgium; France				
July -26	Canadian Lawn Tennis National Championships; Toronto, Ontario, Canada	(Republic of Ireland) George Lyttleton-Rogers; 6–4, 8–6, 0–6, 9–7	(Canada) Gilbert Nunns	(Canada) Olive Wade	(Canada) Marjorie Leeming		
July -26	Canadian Lawn Tennis National Championships; Toronto, Ontario, Canada	(United States) Mercur / (United States) Hall; 11–9, 6–2, 6–4	(Canada) Nunns / (Canada) Martin	(Canada) M. Leeming / (Canada) H. Leeming; 6–3, 6–3	(Canada) Symons / H. Bickie	(Canada) John S. Proctor / (Canada) M. Leeming; 7–5, 6–2	(Canada) C.W. Aikman / (Canada) H.L. Beer
July 25–27	Davis Cup Challenge Round Final; Paris, France	France (c) 4–1	United States				
July	Swiss International Championship; Basel, Switzerland	(Switzerland) Hector Fisher; 4–6, 3–6, 6–2, 6–0, 6–3	(Denmark) Erik Worm	(France) Ida Adamoff; 6–4, 6–4	(France) Germaine Golding		
July	Swiss International Championship; Basel, Switzerland	(Weimar Republic) Buss / (Denmark) Worm; 6–2, 6–0, 6–1	(Switzerland) Aeschlimann / (Switzerland) Wuarin	N/A	N/A	(Denmark) Worm / (France) Adamoff; 5–7, 6–2, 6–1	(Switzerland) Aeschlimann / (Belgium) Isaac
July	Pro Championships of Great Britain; London, United Kingdom	(United Kingdom) Dan Maskell; 6–1, 6–0, 6–2	(United Kingdom) T.C. Jeffery				
July	Pro Championships of Great Britain; London, United Kingdom	(United Kingdom) C.R. Read / (United Kingdom) T.C. Jeffery; 6–9, 6–4, 6–1	(United Kingdom) F.H. Poulson / (United Kingdom) J.W. Pearce				
July	Frinton-on-Sea Tournament; Frinton-on-Sea, United Kingdom	(United Kingdom) Bunny Austin; 6–2, 8–6	(United Kingdom) John Olliff	(United Kingdom) Eileen Bennett Whittingstall; 6–3, 0–6, 6–l	(United Kingdom) Joan Ridley		
July	Bavarian International Championships; Munich, Weimar Republic	(France) Emanuelle Du Plaix; 2–6, 6–3, 3–6, 6–2, 6–4	(United States) Berkeley Bell	(United States) Elizabeth Ryan; 6–3, 6–3	(Weimar Republic) Klara Hammer		
July	Bavarian International Championships; Munich, Weimar Republic	(France) Du Plaix / (United States) Bell; 6:2, 6:3, 10:8	(Weimar Republic) Kleinschroth / (Switzerland) Fischer	N/A	N/A	(Weimar Republic) Kleinschroth / (United States) Ryan w/o	(Weimar Republic) Buss / Bergmann
July	Scottish Championships; Peebles, United Kingdom	(Australia) Jack Crawford vs. (United Kingdom) Colin Gregory unplayed		(United Kingdom) Winnie Mason; 3–6, 6–3, 6–3	(Australia) (United Kingdom) Esna Boyd Robertson		
July	Scottish Championships; Peebles, United Kingdom	(United Kingdom) Collins / (United Kingdom) W.A.R. Collins; 3–6, 11–9, suspended	Scovel / (United Kingdom) Gregory	N/A	N/A	N/A	N/A
July	Puerto Rican National Championships; Puerto Rico, American West Indies	(United States) Manuel Rodríguez; N/A	N/A				

== August ==
- The International Tennis Federation published the total income of the Davis Cup Challenge Round Final, which was 1,774,000 francs (~US$70,000).
- The German professionals led by Hans Nüsslein and Roman Najuch beat the Dutch pros five-love.
- The German ladies played a draw, six-all, against England.
- Japan Davis Cup team annihilated Poland five to zero.
- Japan won the tri-nations challenge in Berlin with six victories, Australia finished right behind with five and hosting Germany the last with four.
- In a re-match from last month United Kingdom Davis Cup team overcame Australia scoring 5–3.

Month	Event	Men		Women		Mixed	
Month	Event	Champions	Runner-up	Champions	Runner-up	Champions	Runner-up
August	Portuguese International Championships; Lisbon, Portugal	(Spain) Enrique Maier; 6–3, 6–1, 5–7, 7–5	(Spain) José-Maria Tejada	N/A	N/A		
July 28 – August 3	Dutch National Championships; Hilversum, Netherlands	(Netherlands) Hendrik Timmer; 6–1, 6–2, 6–3	(Netherlands) Nauta	(Netherlands) Madzy Rollin Couquerque; 6–2, 6–2	(Netherlands) Canters		
July 28 – August 3	Dutch National Championships; Hilversum, Netherlands	(Netherlands) Theo van Eek / (Netherlands) Wetselaar; 2–6, 3–6, 6–2, 7–5, 6–1	(Netherlands) v.d. Heide / (Netherlands) V. Olst	(Netherlands) Madzy Rollin Couquerque / (Netherlands) Canters; 6–3, 6–3	(Netherlands) N. Lhoest / (Netherlands) N. Staab	(Netherlands) M. Koopman / (Netherlands) Dros-Canters; 6–2, 6–3	(Netherlands) Straub-Jansen / (Netherlands) J. Ruys
August -5	Malayan Lawn Tennis Championships; Kuala Lumpur, Federated Malay States	Huyuh Van Giao w/o	Nguyen van Chim	(Malayan Union) A.K. Allin; 3–6, 6–1, 6–4	(Straits Settlements) Taylor		
August -5	Malayan Lawn Tennis Championships; Kuala Lumpur, Federated Malay States	(Empire of Japan) Shoyo Matsukawa / (Empire of Japan) Kawajiri; 2–6, 6–4, 6–2	van Chim / van Giao	(France) Fraunie / (France) Gras; 6–3, 6–8, N/A	Taylor / Griffith-Jones	Van Giao / (France) Gras; 3–6, 6–3, 6–1	N. E. Wise / Taylor
August 6–11	German Championships; Hamburg, Weimar Republic	(France) Christian Boussus; 1–6, 8–6, 2–6, 7–5, 6–4	(Empire of Japan) Yoshiro Ohta	(Weimar Republic) Cilly Aussem; 8–6, 6–4	(Weimar Republic) Hilde Krahwinkel		
August 6–11	German Championships; Hamburg, Weimar Republic	(Australia) Moon / (Australia) Crawford; 6–3, 2–6, 6–4, 6–3	(Empire of Japan) Abe / (Empire of Japan) Harada	(United Kingdom) Godfree / (United Kingdom) Holoroff; 6–3, 7–5	(United Kingdom) Haylock / (United Kingdom) Mudford	(United Kingdom) Gregory / (United Kingdom) Godfree; 6–3, 7–5	(United Kingdom) Lester / (United Kingdom) Haylock
August –12	Championships of Engadin; St. Moritz, Switzerland	(Italy) Placido Gaslini; 6–0, 6–1, 6–4	(Italy) Alberto del Bono	(France) Germaine Golding; 3–6, 6–3, 6–1	(Weimar Republic) Hete Kaeber Stitzel		
August –12	Championships of Engadin; St. Moritz, Switzerland	(Italy) de Stefani / (Italy) del Bono; 6–1, 6–1	(Denmark) Worm / (Italy) Gaslini				
August 11	Meadow Club Tournament; Southampton, New York, United States	(United States) Sidney Wood; 3–6, 6–3, 2–6, 6–2, 6–4	(United States) Wilmer Allison	N/A	N/A		
August 11	American West Indies Championships; Altona, Saint Thomas, United States Virgin Islands, American West Indies	(United States) Manuel Rodríguez; 0–6, 6–4, N/A	(United States) Richard Spenceley	N/A	N/A		
August 9–17	Pörtschach Championships; Pörtschach am Wörthersee, Weimar Republic	(Hungary) Béla von Kehrling; 5–7, 6–3, 6–8, 6–3, 6–2	(France) Emanuelle Du Plaix	(Weimar Republic) Toni Schomburgk; 6–3, 6–2	Mrs.Deutch		
August 9–17	Pörtschach Championships; Pörtschach am Wörthersee, Weimar Republic	(Austria) Artens / (Austria) Matejka; 4–6, 6–4, 7–5, 6–2	(Hungary) Kehrling / (France) Du Plaix	N/A	N/A	(Weimar Republic) Schomburgk / (Weimar Republic) Schomburgk; 6–8, 6–3, 6–2	(Austria) Michel Haberl / Helmer
-19 August	Le Havre Tournament; Le Havre, France	(France) Raymond Rodel; 6–2, 6–2, 6–3	(France) Edouard Thurneyssen	(France) Sylvie Jung Henrotin; 4–6, 6–3, 6–2	(France) Arlette Neufeld		
-19 August	Le Havre Tournament; Le Havre, France	(France) Rodel / (France) G. Jung; 8–6, 6–3, 6–4	(France) Thurneyssen / (France) Danet	(France) Neufeld / Wolfson; 6–4, 6–3	(France) Henrotin / Danet	(France) Danet / (France) Neufeld; 6–4, 2–6, 6–4	(France) Thurneyssen / (France) Henrotin
August 16–24	Swedish Championships; Stockholm, Sweden	(Sweden) Curt Östberg; 3 sets to 2	(Sweden) Ingvar Garell	(Sweden) Sigrid Fick; 2 sets to 1	(Sweden) Lily Strömberg-von Essen		
August 16–24	Swedish Championships; Stockholm, Sweden	(Sweden) Östberg / (Sweden) Ramberg; 3 sets to 0	(Sweden) Müller / (Sweden) Garell	(Sweden) Fick / (Sweden) von Essen w/o	(Sweden) Lindberg / (Sweden) Ramberg	(Sweden) Östberg/ (Sweden) Fick; 2 sets to 0	(Sweden) Müller / (Sweden) von Essen
~August 25–31	Bad Homburg Championships; Bad Homburg vor der Höhe, Weimar Republic	(Australia) Harry Hopman; 2–6, 6–4, 6–3, 0–6, 6–4	(France) Christian Boussus	(Weimar Republic) Ilse Friedleben w/o	(Weimar Republic) Hilde Krahwinkel		
~August 25–31	Bad Homburg Championships; Bad Homburg vor der Höhe, Weimar Republic	(Australia) Willard / (Australia) Hopman; 9–7, 6–8, 7–5, 6–3	(Empire of Japan) Sato / (Weimar Republic) L. Lorentz	(Weimar Republic) Peitz / (Weimar Republic) Krahwinkel; 6–1, 6–3	(Weimar Republic) Schomburgk / (Weimar Republic) Friedleben	(Australia) Willard / (Weimar Republic) Krahwinkel; 6–4, 4–6, 6–3	(Weimar Republic) Kuhlmann / (Weimar Republic) Friedleben
-26 August	North of England Championships; Scarborough, United Kingdom	(New Zealand) Eskell Andrews; 6–0, 9–7	(United Kingdom) Colin Gregory	(United Kingdom) Mary Heeley; 6–4, 6–3	(United Kingdom) Joan Fry		
-26 August	North of England Championships; Scarborough, United Kingdom	(United Kingdom) Gregory / (United Kingdom) Kingsley; 6–1, 6–3	(New Zealand) Andrews / (New Zealand) Malfroy	(United Kingdom) Fry / (United Kingdom) Dix; 6–1, 6–2	(United Kingdom) Heeley / Hennuant	(United Kingdom) Gregory / (United Kingdom) Dix; 6–4, 8–6	(United Kingdom) Kingsley / Rose
August 25–31	Yugoslavian International Championships; Zagreb, Kingdom of Serbs, Croats and Slovenes	(France) Emanuelle Du Plaix; 6–1, 6–4, 3–6, 6–2	(Hungary) Béla von Kehrling	(Hungary) Magda Baumgarten; N/A	(Czechoslovakia) Fröhlichova		
August 25–31	Yugoslavian International Championships; Zagreb, Kingdom of Serbs, Croats and Slovenes	(Hungary) Gabrowitz / (Hungary) Kehrling; N/A	(Socialist Federal Republic of Yugoslavia) Šefer / (Socialist Federal Republic of Yugoslavia) Kukuljevic	(Socialist Federal Republic of Yugoslavia) Gostisa / (Socialist Federal Republic of Yugoslavia) Würth	(Hungary) Baumgarten / Schweighardt	(Czechoslovakia) Malacek / (Hungary) Schräger; N/A	(Hungary) Gabrowitz / (Socialist Federal Republic of Yugoslavia) Würth
August 25–31	National bout	(Socialist Federal Republic of Yugoslavia) Franjo Šefer	(Socialist Federal Republic of Yugoslavia) Franjo Kukuljevic				
August	Ostende Championships; Ostend, Belgium	(Italy) Gino de Martino; 6–4, 3–6, 6–0, 12-10	(France) Raymond Rodel	(France) Simonne Mathieu; 6–3, 6–1	(United Kingdom) Susan Noel		
August	Ostende Championships; Ostend, Belgium	(Italy) de Martino / (France) Thurneyssen; 6–1, 6–3, 4–6, 6–4	(France) Rodel / (Austria) Salm	(United Kingdom) Noel / Sauvage; 3–6, 6–3, 7–5	(Belgium) de Borman / (France) Mathieu	(France) Thurneyssen / (France) Mathieu; 8–6, 6–8, 6–4	(Belgium) Van Zuylen / (United Kingdom) Noel
August	14th ATA All-Black National Championships; Indianapolis, United States	(United States) Douglas Turner; N/A	N/A	(United States) Ora Washington; N/A	N/A		
August	14th ATA All-Black National Championships; Indianapolis, United States	(United States) McGriff / (United States) Downing; N/A	N/A	(United States) Winston / (United States) Washington; N/A	N/A	(United States) O.B. Williams / (United States) Gant; N/A	N/A

== September ==
- The German pros repeated their feat from last month and beat the English pros to zero, while the English amateurs did so also in a best-of-nine match.
- D.G. Freshwater became the English junior champion, while the girls' trophy was awarded to Phyllis Brazier.
- Emil Ferenczy became the Hungarian junior champion, Csilla Lates won the girls' contest.
- American Clay Court and Canadian doubles champion Frederic Mercur was suspended by the USLTA for breaching the amateur rules.

Month	Event	Men		Women		Mixed	
Month	Event	Champions	Runner-up	Champions	Runner-up	Champions	Runner-up
September -1	Newport Casino Invitational; Newport, United States	(United States) Bill Tilden; 6–1, 0–6, 5–7, 6–2, 6–4	(United States) Wilmer Allison				
September -1	Newport Casino Invitational; Newport, United States	(United States) Tilden/ (United States) Hunter; 6–3, 6–4, 0–6, 3–6, 6–2	(United States) Coggeshall / (United States) Coen				
20 August–September	US National Championships; Forest Hills, United States (ladies); Boston, United States (doubles, mixed doubles)	(United States) John Doeg; 10-8, 1–6, 6–4, 16–14	(United States) Frank Shields	(United Kingdom) Betty Nuthall; 6–1, 6–4	(United States) Anna McCune Harper		
20 August–September	US National Championships; Forest Hills, United States (ladies); Boston, United States (doubles, mixed doubles)	(United States) Lott / (United States) Doeg; 8–6, 6–3, 4–6, 13-15, 6–4	(United States) Allison / (United States) van Ryn	(United Kingdom) Nuthall / (United States) Palfrey; 3–6, 6–3, 7–5	(United States) McCune Harper / (United States) Cross	(United States) Allison / (United States) Cross; 6–4, 6–4	(United States) Shields / (United States) Morrill
September 1–8	Hungarian International Tennis Championships; Budapest, Hungary; Men's singles	(Czechoslovakia) Roderich Menzel; 4–6, 6–3, 6–4, 6–1	(Hungary) Béla von Kehrling	(Weimar Republic) Hilde Krahwinkel; 6–4, 2–6, 8–6	(Weimar Republic) Anne Peitz		
September 1–8	Hungarian International Tennis Championships; Budapest, Hungary; Men's singles	(Czechoslovakia) Rohrer / (Czechoslovakia) Menzel; 7–5, 8–6, 9–7	(Hungary) Takáts / (Austria) Matejka	(Weimar Republic) Krahwinkel / (Weimar Republic) Peitz; 6–3, 7–5	(France) Gallay / (France) Barbier	(France) Glasser / (France) Barbier; 5–7, 8–6, 6–4	(Weimar Republic) Kuhlmann / (Weimar Republic) Krahwinkel
September 5–9	Le Touquet Spa Championships; Le Touquet, France	(France) Marcel Bernard; 6–8, 6–1, 2–6, 6–1, 8–6	(United States) Bill Breese	(United States) Ryan; 6–0, 6–1	(France) Michel Bernard		
September 5–9	Le Touquet Spa Championships; Le Touquet, France	(France) Bonte / (France) Rimet; 9–7, 4–6, 6–4, 6–2	(France) Cousin / (France) Sergeant	(United States) Ryan / (Spain) Álvarez; 6–1, 6–3	(France) Bernard / Chanove	(France) Martin-Legeay / (Spain) Álvarez; 6–3, 6–2	(France) Boussus / (United States) Ryan
September 12–	La Baule Tournament; La Baule-Escoublac, France	(France) Paul Féret; 6–4, 6–2	(France) Pierre Goldschmidt	(France) Leila Claude-Anet; 6–1, 3–6, 6–0	Rudel		
September 12–	La Baule Tournament; La Baule-Escoublac, France	(France) Goldschmidt / Renard; 6–4, 6–3, 6–4	(France) Broquedis / (France) Gajan	N/A	N/A	(France) Cochet / (United States) Ryan; 6–3, 6–3	(France) Féret / (France) Claude-Anet
September ~17	Adriatic Championships; Prince of Piedmont Cup; Venice, Italy	(France) Christian Boussus; 1–6, 6–3, 6–4, 2–6, 6–2	(France) Emanuelle du Plaix	N/A	N/A		
September ~17	Adriatic Championships; Prince of Piedmont Cup; Venice, Italy	(United Kingdom) Hughes / (Austria) Artens; 6–3, 6–4, 6–4	(Weimar Republic) Kleinschroth / (Austria) Salm	(France) Barbier / (France) Gallay; 6–3, 6–3, 6–2	(Weimar Republic) Rost / (Italy) Valerio	N/A	N/A
September 16–20	US and World Pro Championships; Forest Hills, United States	(United States) Vincent Richards; 2–6, 10-8, 6–3, 6–4	(Czechoslovakia) Karel Koželuh				
September 16–20	US and World Pro Championships; Forest Hills, United States	(United States) Kinsey/Richards; 6–2, 15-13, 7–5	(Czechoslovakia) Koželuh / (Weimar Republic) Najuch				
September	Luzern International Championships; Lucerne, Switzerland	(Empire of Japan) Hyotaro Sato; 6–1, 6–0, 4–6, 6–4	(Greece) Orestis Garangiotis	(Weimar Republic) Ilse Friedleben; 4–6, 6–2, 10-8	(Switzerland) Lolette Payot		
September	Luzern International Championships; Lucerne, Switzerland	(Empire of Japan) Sato / (Greece) Garangiotis; 2–6, 6–3, 6–4, 1–6, 6–4	(Weimar Republic) L. Lorentz / Keller	N/A	N/A	(Empire of Japan) Sato / (Switzerland) Payot; 4–6, 6–2, 6–3	(Weimar Republic) L. Lorentz / (Weimar Republic) Neppach
September	Düsseldorf Tournament; Düsseldorf, Weimar Republic	(Empire of Japan) Sato; 6–4, 2–6, 6–3, 5–7, 6–4	(Australia) Harry Hopman	(Weimar Republic) Paula von Reznicek; 7–9, ret.	(Weimar Republic) Ilse Friedleben		
September	Düsseldorf Tournament; Düsseldorf, Weimar Republic	(Empire of Japan) Abe / (Empire of Japan) Sato; 3–6, 6–2, 3–6, 7–5, 6–4	(Weimar Republic) Dessart / (Weimar Republic) Nourney	N/A	N/A	(Australia) Willard / (Weimar Republic) Krahwinkel; 6–1, 4–6, 6–0	(Empire of Japan) Abe / (Weimar Republic) Friedleben
September	Belgian International Championships II. Antwerp, Belgium	(Austria) Franz Wilhelm Matejka; 6–1, 6–2, 6–3	(France) Jean Lesueur	(France) Simonne Mathieu; 6–2, 6–4	(Belgium) Josane Sigart		
September	Belgian International Championships II. Antwerp, Belgium	(Austria) Matejka / (Belgium) de Borman; 5–7, 10-8, 6–3, 6–3	(Belgium) Ewbank / (Italy) de Martino	(France) Mathieu / (Belgium) Josane Sigart; 6–3, 6–0	(France) Gallay / (France) Barbier	(Belgium) Lacroix / (Belgium) Josane Sigart; 6–3, 6–3	(France) Goldschmidt / (France) Mathieu
September	Pacific Southwest Championships; Los Angeles, United States	(United States) Ellsworth Vines; 14-11, 6–3, 6–4	(United States) Gregory Mangin	N/A	N/A		
September	Pacific Southwest Championships; Los Angeles, United States	(United States) Allison / (United States) Van Ryn; N/A	N/A	N/A	N/A	N/A	N/A
September -28	South of England Championships; Eastbourne, United Kingdom	(Empire of Japan) Tatsuyoshi Miki; 7–5, 6–3	(United Kingdom) Charles Kingsley	(United Kingdom) Phyllis Mudford; 6–2, 7–5	(United Kingdom) Mary Heeley		
September -28	South of England Championships; Eastbourne, United Kingdom	(United Kingdom) Peters / (United Kingdom) Lester vs. (United Kingdom) Eames / (United Kingdom) Kingsley unplayed, title divided		N/A	N/A	(Empire of Japan) Miki / (United Kingdom) Mudford w/o	no opponents, semifinals suspended
September 22-	Villa d'Este Championship; Villa d'Este, Italy	(France) Emanuelle Du Plaix; 6–2, 8–6, ret.	(Weimar Republic) Heinrich Kleinschroth	(Italy) Lucia Valerio; 6–3, 6–4	(France) Ida Adamoff		
September 22-	Villa d'Este Championship; Villa d'Este, Italy	N/A	N/A	(France) Adamoff / (Weimar Republic) Friedleben; 4–6, 6–2, 3–6	(Italy) Colombo / Boceiards	N/A	N/A
September 26–28	Belgrade Championships; Belgrade, Kingdom of Serbs, Croats and Slovenes	(Socialist Federal Republic of Yugoslavia) Franjo Šefer; 4 sets	(Hungary) Emil Gabrowitz	(Hungary) Magda Baumgarten; N/A	(Socialist Federal Republic of Yugoslavia) Lili Schräger		
September 26–28	Belgrade Championships; Belgrade, Kingdom of Serbs, Croats and Slovenes	(Socialist Federal Republic of Yugoslavia) Šefer / (Socialist Federal Republic of Yugoslavia) Radović	(Hungary) Nándor Friedrich / (Hungary) Gabrowitz	N/A	N/A	(Socialist Federal Republic of Yugoslavia) Šefer / Schräger; N/A	(Socialist Federal Republic of Yugoslavia) Radović / (Hungary) Baumgarten
September 25–30	Romanian Championship; Bukarest, Romania	(Romania) Constantin Cantacuzino; 7–5, 6–4, 6–1	(Romania) Alexandru Botez	(Romania) Lenke Zizovits; 5–7, 6–0, 6–1	(Romania) Nini Golescu		
September 25–30	Romanian Championship; Bukarest, Romania	(Romania) Hamburger / (Romania) Krupensky; 10-8, 3–6, 6–4, 6–2	(Romania) San Galli / (Romania) Bunea	(Romania) Zizovits / (Romania) Golescu; 9–7, 6–1	(Romania) Mrs. Fülöp / (Romania) Giurgiutiu	(Romania) Poulieff / (Romania) Golescu toss	(Romania) Velvárth / (Romania) Zizovits
September	German Pro Championships; Berlin, Weimar Republic	(France) Martin Plaa	(Weimar Republic) Hans Nüsslein, (Weimar Republic) Hermann Bartelt, (Weimar Republic) Hermann Richter unplayed, prize divided				
September	German Pro Championships; Berlin, Weimar Republic	(Republic of Ireland) Burke / (France) Plaa; N/A	Round robin losers				

== October ==
- Betty Nuthall's racquet, which she used during the US Nationals was auctioned for 4000 Deutsche Marks on the board of RMS Mauretania.
- The American umpires and line judges formed a union.
- The South American Davis Cup zone draws were held.
- United Kingdom beat Ireland. The Irish team only won one rubber.
- Germany and Italy's twelve rubber challenge ended in a draw.
- The joint men-ladies Indian tennis team defeated Scotland only losing the three mixed doubles matches.
- Gustaf V of Sweden was appointed honorary president of the International Lawn Tennis Club de France.

Month	Event	Men		Women		Mixed	
Month	Event	Champions	Runner-up	Champions	Runner-up	Champions	Runner-up
24 September – 5 October	Coupe Porée; Coupe Georges Gouttenoire (ladies); Coupe Jacques Leféburre (mixed); Paris, France	(France) Jean Borotra; 6–1, 6–3, 1–6, 5–7, 6–4	(France) Christian Boussus	(France) Simonne Mathieu; 6–0, 6–2	(France) Leila Claude-Anet		
24 September – 5 October	Coupe Porée; Coupe Georges Gouttenoire (ladies); Coupe Jacques Leféburre (mixed); Paris, France	(France) de Buzelet / (France) Bernard; 4–6, 3–6, 6–4, 6–0, 6–4	(Egypt) J. Grandguillot / (Egypt) P. Grandguillot	(France) Barbier / (France) Mathieu; 7–5, 7–5	(France) Rosambert / (France) Metaxa	(France) Bonte / (France) Berthet; 6–4, 2–6, 6–3	(France) Bernard / (France) Claude-Anet
October –6	Welsh Covered Courts Championships; Llandudno, United Kingdom	(Netherlands) Hendrik Timmer; 6–1, 6–0, 7–5	B. O. Hobbs	N/A	N/A		
October –6	Welsh Covered Courts Championships; Llandudno, United Kingdom	(Republic of Ireland) Allman-Smith / (Netherlands) Timmer; 6–1, 6–4, 6–3	W. Pyemont / (Republic of Ireland) W. G. Ireland	N/A	N/A	(Netherlands) Timmer / (United Kingdom) Ingram; 6–3, 6–3	(Republic of Ireland) Allman-Smith / (United Kingdom) Bouverie
October –6	Brazilian International Championships; Rio de Janeiro, Brazil			(Spain) Lilí Álvarez	(Brazil) Florence Texeira		
October –7	West Ealing Tournament; West Ealing, United Kingdom	William Powell; 6–3, 6–3	(South Africa) Pat Spence	(United Kingdom) Phyllis Mudford; 7–5, 3–6, 9–7	(United Kingdom) Mary Heeley		
October –7	West Ealing Tournament; West Ealing, United Kingdom	(South Africa) Spence / (United Kingdom) Olliff; N/A	N/A	(United Kingdom) Sterry / (United Kingdom) Godfree; N/A	N/A	(Empire of Japan) Miki / (United Kingdom) Round; N/A	N/A
October 3–9	Meran Championship; Merano, Italy	(Austria) Hermann Artens; 6–4, 6–4, 0–6, 6–3	(Austria) Franz Wilhelm Matejka	N/A	N/A		
October 3–9	Meran Championship; Merano, Italy	(France) Boussus / (France) Du Plaix; 1–6, 6–4, 6–4, 6–2	(France) Glasser / (Austria) Salm	N/A / N/A	N/A / N/A	(France) Boussus / (Weimar Republic) Aussem; 8–6, 6–0	(Austria) Artens / (Weimar Republic) Schomburgk
October 22	British Covered Court Championships; London, United Kingdom	(France) Jean Borotra; 6–1, 0–6, 2–6, 6–2, 6–4	(United Kingdom) Bunny Austin	(United Kingdom) Joan Ridley; 6–2, 6–2	(United Kingdom) Joan Fry		
October 22	British Covered Court Championships; London, United Kingdom	(United Kingdom) Austin / (United Kingdom) Olliff; 8–6, 15-13, 6—4	(United Kingdom) Ingram / (United Kingdom) Wilde	N/A	N/A	(United Kingdom) Kingsley / (United Kingdom) Ridley; 6–4, 8–6	(United Kingdom) Olliff / (United Kingdom) Godfree
~October 19	Baden-Baden Championship; Baden-Baden, Weimar Republic	(United Kingdom) Pat Hughes; 2–6, 8–6, ret.	(Weimar Republic) Otto Froitzheim	(France) Simonne Mathieu; 6–2, 7–5	(Weimar Republic) Ilse Friedleben		
~October 19	Baden-Baden Championship; Baden-Baden, Weimar Republic	(United Kingdom) Hughes / Fischer; 2–6, 2–6, 6–3, 6–2, 6–4	(Weimar Republic) Buss / Oppenheimer	N/A	N/A	(United Kingdom) Hughes / (Weimar Republic) Friedleben; 4–6, 6–0, 6–1	(Weimar Republic) Buss (France) Mathieu

== November ==
- Augusto Rado became the Italian junior champion.
- On the last meeting if the ITF the split of the European Zone into North-South divisions was rejected.
- 1924 Summer Olympics bronze doubles medalist Evelyn Colyer died.

Month	Event	Men		Women		Mixed	
Month	Event	Champions	Runner-up	Champions	Runner-up	Champions	Runner-up
November	Mitre Cup; Rio de Janeiro, Brazil	Champion Argentina 4–1	Runner-up Chile				
November	Portuguese International Championships II. Portugal	(France) Pierre Henri Landry; 6–8, 1–6, 6–4, 6–2, 6–1	(France) Emanuelle Du Plaix	N/A	N/A		
November	Portuguese International Championships II. Portugal	(France) Landry / (France) Du Plaix; 6–1, 6–2, 6–4	(Portugal) De Verda / (Portugal) Pinto-Coelho	N/A	N/A	N/A	N/A
November	Italian National Championships; Rome, Italy	(Italy) Giorgio De Stefani; 3 points, 9 sets, 54 games^{[c]}	(Italy) Clemente Serventi	(Italy) Lucia Valerio; 6–0, 6–0	(Italy) Rosetta Gagliardi Prouse		
November	Italian National Championships; Rome, Italy	(Italy) J. De Martino / (Italy) G. De Martino; 9–7, 6–3, 6–1	(Italy) De Minerbi / (Italy) Serventi	N/A	N/A	(Italy) De Stefani / (Italy) Valerio; 6–1, 6–2	(Italy) D'Avalos / (Italy) Riboli
November	Swiss Covered Courts Championships; Zürich, Switzerland	(France) Antoine Gentien; 6–1, 3–6, 6–3	(Switzerland) Max Ellmer	(Weimar Republic) Paula von Reznicek; 6–3, 6–1	(France) Germaine Golding		
November	Swiss Covered Courts Championships; Zürich, Switzerland	(France) Gentien / Tihy; 3–6, 6–3, 5–7, 6–4, 8–6	(Switzerland) de Blonay / (Switzerland) Simon	(Weimar Republic) von Reznicek / (Switzerland) N. Dyrenfurth; 5–7, 6–4, 12-10	(Switzerland) Schäublin / (France) Golding	(Switzerland) de Blonay / (Weimar Republic) von Reznicek; 6–3, 7–5	(Italy) A. Fabbricotti / (Switzerland) N. Dyrenfurth
November	Queen's Club Covered Courts Championships; London, United Kingdom	(United Kingdom) Edward Avory; 8–6, 2–6, 6–3	(Portugal) José De Verda	(United Kingdom) Joan Ridley; 6–2, 6–4	(United Kingdom) Elise Pittman		
November	Queen's Club Covered Courts Championships; London, United Kingdom	(Empire of Japan) Aoki / (Empire of Japan) Miki; 6–1, 7–5	(United Kingdom) Avory / Barber	N/A	N/A	N/A	N/A
November	Cromer Covered Courts Championships; Cromer, United Kingdom	(United Kingdom) Edward Avory; 6–1, 7–5	(Empire of Japan) Tatsuyoshi Miki	(United Kingdom) Dorothy Round Little; 2–6, 9–7. 6–4	(United Kingdom) Joan Ridley		
November	Cromer Covered Courts Championships; Cromer, United Kingdom	(United Kingdom) Crole-Rees / (United Kingdom) Eames; 9–7, 6–1	(United Kingdom) Barclay / Toogood	(United Kingdom) Haylock / (United Kingdom) Round; 6–4, 6–0	(United Kingdom) Ridley / Edwards	(Empire of Japan) Miki / (United Kingdom) Round; 7–5, 6–2	(United Kingdom) Crole-Rees / Melloros
November	Japan National Championships; Tokyo, Empire of Japan	(Empire of Japan) Jiro Sato; 6–4, 8–6, 6–2	(Empire of Japan) Hyotaro Sato	(Empire of Japan) Tomoko Kobayashi; N/A	N/A		
November	Japan National Championships; Tokyo, Empire of Japan	(Empire of Japan) Yamagishi / H. Shimura; 6–4, 6–3, 6–4	(Empire of Japan) Nunoi / Kuwabara	(Republic of China (1912–1949)) Gloria Lee / (Republic of China (1912–1949)) Lucy Lee; N/A	N/A		
November 10–16	Lowlands Championships; Peebles, United Kingdom	(Netherlands) Hendrik Timmer; 1–6, 6–1, 6–2,	(United Kingdom) Keats Lester	N/A	N/A		
November 10–16	Lowlands Championships; Peebles, United Kingdom	(Netherlands) Timmer / (New Zealand) Fisher; 6–2, 6–4	(United Kingdom) Lester / (United Kingdom) Sharpe	N/A	N/A	N/A	N/A
November –15	Argentine International Championships; Argentina	(United Kingdom) Fred Perry; 6–4, 6–1, 6–0	(United Kingdom) Eric Peters	(Spain) Lilí de Álvarez; 6–2, 6–2	(United Kingdom) Phoebe Holcroft Watson		
November –15	Argentine International Championships; Argentina	(Argentina) Zappa / Castillo w/o	(United Kingdom) Lee / Perry	(United Kingdom) Watson / Harvey; 6–3, 3–6, 6–2	(Spain) Álvarez / Miss Anderson	(Argentina) Boyd / (Spain) Álvarez; 5–7, 10–8, 6–2	(United Kingdom) Perry / Watson

== December ==
- Australia announced he'd skip the 1931 Davis Cup season as a sign of support of the rejected South African initiative for the Cup to be held every second year only.
- Two-time former Wimbledon champion Gerald Patterson's application for a renewed amateur license was rejected.
- The Lawn Tennis Association introduced two new rules regarding timeouts during play: It became forbidden to receive extra time to get coach advises or to pause for rest.
- Bobby Heine announced he won't compete in the Wimbledon Championships next year.
- It was revealed that the total income of the 1930 Wimbledon Championships was £37,024.

Month	Event	Men		Women		Mixed	
Month	Event	Champions	Runner-up	Champions	Runner-up	Champions	Runner-up
December	Victorian Championships; Melbourne, Australia	(Australia) Jack Crawford; 6–1, 8–10, 6–0, 6–2	(Australia) Harry Hopman	(Australia) Marjorie Cox Crawford; 6–1, 6–1	Miss Wright		
December	Victorian Championships; Melbourne, Australia	(Australia) Schlesinger / (Australia) Clemenger; 3–6, 6–2, 3–6, 4–6	(Australia) Crawford / (Australia) Hopman			(Australia) Hopman/ (Australia) Eleanor Mary Hall; 5–7, 8–6, 10–8	(Australia) Crawford / (Australia) Crawford
December	Straits Chinese Recreation Club Championships; Singapore, Straits Settlements	(Straits Settlements) (Republic of China (1912–1949)) Lim Bong Soo; N/A	N/A				
December -14	Catalonia Championships; Barcelona, Spain	(Spain) Enrique Maier; N/A	(Spain) Francisco Sindreu	(Spain) Bella Duttón de Pons; N/A	(Spain) Rosa Torras		
December -14	Catalonia Championships; Barcelona, Spain	(Spain) Maier / (Spain) Sindreu; 6–3, 6–2, 6–4	(Spain) Flaquer / (Spain) Andreu	(Spain) Pons / (Spain) Torras; N/A	(Spain) Herberg / (Spain) Fontrodona	(Spain) Maier / (Spain) Torras; N/A	(Spain) Flaquer / (Spain) Pons
December -30	India International Championships; Calcutta, British India	(United Kingdom) Bunny Austin; 6–2, 7–5, 6–1	(New Zealand) Eskel Andrews	(British Raj) Jenny Sandison; 7–5, 6–4	(British Raj) Lena McKenna		
December -30	India International Championships; Calcutta, British India	(New Zealand) Andrews / (United Kingdom) Horn; 6–2, 6–3, 6–1	(British Raj) Kapoor / (British Raj) Singh	(British Raj) Sandison / Simon	(British Raj) McKenna / (United Kingdom) Stork	(British Raj) Edwards / (British Raj) Sandison; 6–1, 6–3	(British Raj) Hodges / (United Kingdom) Stork

== Unknown date ==
Event	Men		Women		Mixed	
Event	Champions	Runner-up	Champions	Runner-up	Champions	Runner-up
Belgian National Championships; Belgium	(Belgium) Leopold de Borman; N/A	N/A	N/A	N/A		
Belgian National Championships; Belgium	(Belgium) André Laloux / (Belgium) Guy van Zuylen; N/A	N/A	(Belgium) Émile Dupont / (Belgium) Leonie Lhoest; N/A	N/A	(Belgium) Leopold de Borman / (Belgium) Mrs. Sauvage; N/A	N/A
Finnish Championships; Helsinki, Finland	(Finland) Helge Ingman; N/A	N/A	(Finland) Anita Brunou; N/A	N/A		
Finnish Championships; Helsinki, Finland	(Finland) Helge Ingman / (Finland) Aurelio Lanciai; N/A	N/A	(Finland) Anita Brunou / (Finland) Ruth Olander; N/A	N/A	(Finland) Bo Grotenfelt / (Finland) Anita Brunou; N/A	N/A
Finnish Covered Court Championships; Helsinki, Finland	(Finland) Arne Grahn; N/A	N/A	(Finland) Anita Brunou; N/A	N/A		
Finnish Covered Court Championships; Helsinki, Finland	(Finland) Arne Grahn / (Finland) Bo Grotenfelt; N/A	N/A	(Finland) Anita Brunou / (Finland) Elna Lindfors; N/A	N/A	(Finland) Bo Grotenfelt / (Finland) Anita Brunou; N/A	N/A
German Championship; Weimar Republic	(Weimar Republic) Willy Bräuer; N/A	N/A	N/A	N/A		
Norwegian Championship; Norway	(Norway) Torleif Torkildsen; N/A	N/A	N/A	N/A		
Peruvian National Championship; Peru	(Peru) Alberto Gallo; N/A	N/A	(Peru) Adriana Alfajeme	N/A		
Polish Championship; Poland	(Poland) Ignacy Tłoczyński; N/A	(Poland) Stolarow	N/A	N/A		

== Notes ==
- ^{c} The Italian National Men's Championships were fought in a round robin format.
- ^{d} The first official Open tournament was finally organized in 1968.

== Rankings ==
These are the rankings compiled and published by A Wallis Myers in September, founder of the International Lawn Tennis Club of Great Britain and a second list based upon the ranks of Pierre Gillou, president of the Fédération Française de Tennis.

=== Men's singles ===
Myers' singles rankings, as of September 1930
#	Player
1	Henri Cochet (FRA)
2	Bill Tilden (USA)
3	Jean Borotra (FRA)
4	John Doeg (USA)
5	Frank Shields (USA)
6	Wilmer Allison (USA)
7	George Lott (USA)
8	Umberto de Morpurgo (ITA)
9	Christian Boussus (FRA)
10	Bunny Austin (GBR)

Gillou's singles rankings, as of September 1930
#	Player
1	Henri Cochet (FRA)
2	Bill Tilden (USA)
3	Jean Borotra (FRA)
4	John Doeg (USA)
5	Wilmer Allison (USA)
6	George Lott (USA)
7	Umberto de Morpurgo (ITA)
8	Frank Shields (USA)
9	Christian Boussus (FRA)
10	Takeichi Harada (Empire of Japan)

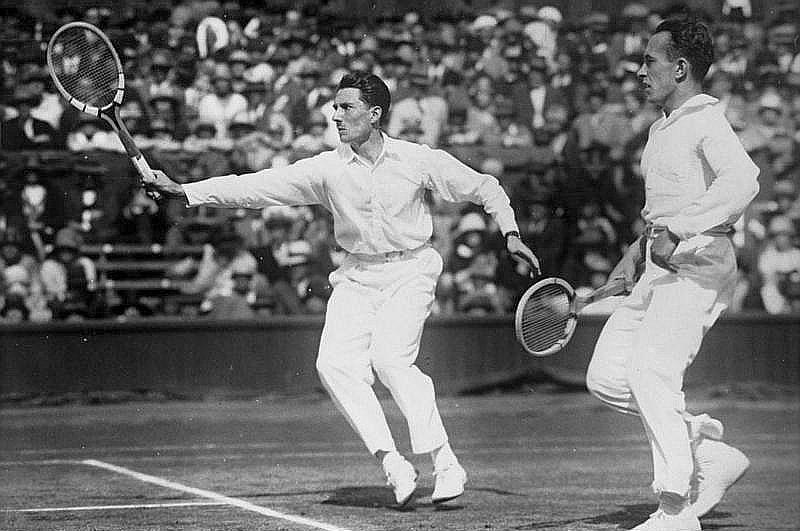
Henri Cochet (right), ranked number one amateur on all lists, with Jacques Brugnon, with whom he won the 1930 Wimbledon doubles (pictured)

=== Women's singles ===
Myers' singles rankings, as of September 1930
#	Player
1	Helen Wills Moody (USA)
2	Cilly Aussem (GER)
3	Phoebe Holcroft Watson (GBR)
4	Elizabeth Ryan (USA)
5	Simonne Mathieu (FRA)
6	Helen Jacobs (USA)
7	Phyllis Mudford (GBR)
8	Lilí Álvarez (ESP)
9	Betty Nuthall (GBR)
10	Hilde Krahwinkel (GER)

Gillou's singles rankings, as of September 1930
#	Player
1	Helen Wills Moody (USA)
2	Cilly Aussem (GER)
3	Simonne Mathieu (FRA)
4	Elizabeth Ryan (USA)
5	Phoebe Holcroft Watson (GBR)
6	Helen Jacobs (USA)
7	Betty Nuthall (GBR)
8	Phyllis Mudford (GBR)
9	Lilí Álvarez (ESP)
10	Hilde Krahwinkel (GER)

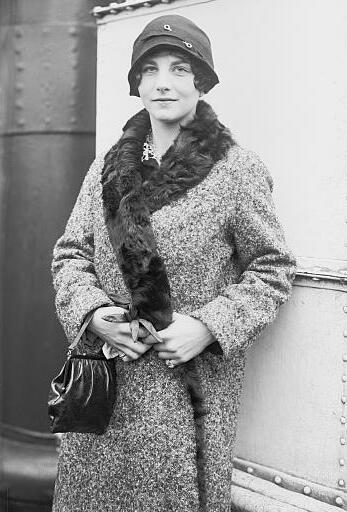
Helen Wills Moody ranked number one amateur on all lists, ladies' champion of Wimbledon and French Championships in both singles and doubles

=== Professionals ===
These are the pro rankings compiled and published by the American Lawn Tennis magazine in January.

Professional rankings, as of January 1930
#	Player
1	Karel Kozeluh (TCH)
2	Vincent Richards (USA)
3	Albert Burke (IRE)
4	Roman Najuch (GER)
5	Harvey Snodgrass (USA)
6	Howard Kinsey (USA)
7	Robert Ramillon (FRA)
8	Martin Plaa (FRA)
9	Edmund Burke (IRE)
10	Joseph Kozeluh (TCH)
