= 1929 French Championships – Men's singles =

Men's singles
- 1929 French Championships

Final
- Champion: (France) René Lacoste
- Runner-up: (France) Jean Borotra
- Score: 6–3, 2–6, 6–0, 2–6, 8–6

Details
- Draw: 83
- Seeds: 16

Events
Singles	men	women		boys	girls
Doubles	men	women	mixed	boys	girls
← 1928 ·	French Championships	· 1930 →

The second seed, René Lacoste, defeated Jean Borotra 6–3, 2–6, 6–0, 2–6, 8–6 in the final to win the men's singles tennis title at the 1929 French Championships.

== Seeds ==
The seeded players are listed below. René Lacoste is the champion; others show the round in which they were eliminated.

1. (France) Henri Cochet (semifinals)
2. (France) René Lacoste (champion)
3. (United States) Bill Tilden (semifinals)
4. (France) Jean Borotra (finalist)
5. (United States) Frank Hunter (quarterfinals)
6. (Italy) Uberto De Morpurgo (quarterfinals)
7. (United Kingdom) Bunny Austin (third round)
8. (United Kingdom) J. Colin Gregory (fourth round)
9. (France) Jacques Brugnon (quarterfinals)
10. (Hungary) Béla Von Kehrling (quarterfinals)
11. (South Africa) Louis Raymond (first round)
12. (Italy) Giorgio de Stefani (first round)
13. (France) Christian Boussus (fourth round)
14. (France) René De Buzelet (second round)
15. (Germany) Daniel Prenn (third round)
16. (Germany) Hans Moldenhauer (fourth round)

== Draw ==
=== Key ===
- Q = Qualifier
- WC = Wild card
- LL = Lucky loser
- r = Retired

=== Final eight ===
Quarterfinals
1	(France) Henri Cochet	7	4	6	7
9	(France) Jacques Brugnon	5	6	4	5
4	(France) Jean Borotra	6	10	4	8	6
5	(United States) Frank Hunter	8	8	6	6	1
6	(Italy) Uberto De Morpurgo	11	6	1	2	6
3	(United States) Bill Tilden	9	3	6	6	8
10	(Hungary) Béla Von Kehrling	6	6	0	3
2	(France) René Lacoste	8	1	6	6

Semifinals
1	(France) Henri Cochet	3	7	5	7	4
4	(France) Jean Borotra	6	5	7	5	6
3	(United States) Bill Tilden	1	0	7	3
2	(France) René Lacoste	6	6	5	6

Final
4	(France) Jean Borotra	3	6	0	6	6
2	(France) René Lacoste	6	2	6	2	8

=== Earlier rounds ===
==== Section 1 ====
First round

Second round
1	(France) Cochet	6	6	6
(Egypt) Zahar	1	2	3
(France) Grandguillot	3	6	7	6
(Czechoslovakia) Menzel	6	0	5	0
16	(Germany) Moldenhauer
(Chile) Torralva-Ponsa
(France) Deniau	3	2	2
(France) Gentien	6	6	6

Third round
1	(France) Cochet	6	6	2	5	6
(France) Grandguillot	1	1	6	7	0
16	(Germany) Moldenhauer	6	6	6
(France) Gentien	2	2	2

Fourth round
1	(France) Cochet	7	6	7
16	(Germany) Moldenhauer	5	4	5

==== Section 2 ====
First round

Second round
8	(United Kingdom) Gregory	6	6	6
(United States) Landauer	0	1	3
(Switzerland) Aeschliman	7	6	6
(United States) Rawlins	5	2	2
9	(France) Brugnon	6	6	6	6
(Italy) Chiesa	1	8	4	1
(Switzerland) Ernst	1	5	0
(Germany) Kleinschroth	6	7	6

Third round
8	(United Kingdom) Gregory	4	6	6	7
(Switzerland) Aeschliman	6	0	0	5
9	(France) Brugnon	8	6	8
(Germany) Kleinschroth	6	4	6

Fourth round
8	(United Kingdom) Gregory	2	7	4	3
9	(France) Brugnon	6	5	6	6

==== Section 3 ====
First round
(France) Glasser
(Austria) Salm

Second round
4	(France) Borotra	7	8	6
(Chile) Torralva-Ponsa	5	6	2
(Monaco) Landau	6	6	6
(France) Rebois	2	1	0
13	(France) Boussus	6	6	6
(Belgium) De Borman	3	3	2
Siedoff	0	6	2	3
(France) Glasser	6	3	6	6

Third round
4	(France) Borotra	6	6	3	6
(Monaco) Landau	4	2	6	4
13	(France) Boussus	6	4	6	6
(France) Glasser	2	6	2	1

Fourth round
4	(France) Borotra	6	4	6	6
13	(France) Boussus	3	6	4	2

==== Section 4 ====
First round
5	(United States) Hunter	6	6	6
(Italy) Del Bono	1	4	0
(Germany) Kuhlmann
(France) Danet
(Czechoslovakia) Malacek	6	7	6
(France) Combemale	3	5	4
(South Africa) Malcolm
(Monaco) Galeppe
12	(Italy) de Stefani
(France) Bernard
(France) Joba	6	4	3	6	2
(Norway) Nielsen	1	6	6	1	6
(Austria) Matejka
(Switzerland) Chiesa
(France) Berthet	2	6	6	6
(India) Fyzee	6	2	0	2

Second round
5	(United States) Hunter	6	7	6
(France) Danet	0	5	3
(Czechoslovakia) Malacek	6	5	6	6
(Monaco) Galeppe	2	7	2	3
(France) Bernard	6	6	6
(Norway) Nielsen	3	1	3
(Austria) Matejka	6	1	6	1	6
(France) Berthet	2	6	1	6	3

Third round
5	(United States) Hunter
(Czechoslovakia) Malacek
(France) Bernard	2	7	10	2	3
(Austria) Matejka	6	5	8	6	6

Fourth round
5	(United States) Hunter	6	2	6	6
(Austria) Matejka	0	6	1	4

==== Section 5 ====
First round
(France) Reynaud
(France) Guillemot
(France) Borotra	3	5	6	6	5
(Austria) Artens	6	7	4	3	7
(Republic of Ireland) Rogers Lyttelton
(Denmark) Rasmussen
(France) Augustin
11	(South Africa) Raymond
(France) Piel	6	6	7
(United Kingdom) Horn	3	4	5
(Italy) Bonzi	6	6	6
(France) Cousin	3	3	1
(Greece) Zerlendis	3	3	6	4
(France) George	6	6	0	6
(France) Rodel	4	0	6	1
6	(Italy) De Morpurgo	6	6	4	6

Second round
(France) Guillemot	4	4	3
(Austria) Artens	6	6	6
(Denmark) Rasmussen	4	6	6	2	6
(France) Augustin	6	4	1	6	0
(France) Piel
(Italy) Bonzi
(France) George	1	1	3
6	(Italy) De Morpurgo	6	6	6

Third round
(Austria) Artens	6	6	0	2	6
(Denmark) Rasmussen	2	2	6	6	1
(Italy) Bonzi	3	1	1
6	(Italy) De Morpurgo	6	6	6

Fourth round
(Austria) Artens	1	3	1
6	(Italy) De Morpurgo	6	6	6

==== Section 6 ====
First round
(Greece) Zafiropoulo	3	1	2
(France) Aslangul	6	6	6
(United States) Coen
(France) Bonte

Second round
(France) Aslangul	9	1	1	6	5
(United States) Coen	7	6	6	4	7
(United Kingdom) Collins
14	(France) De Buzelet
(United Kingdom) Olliff	9	6	3	3	1
(France) Du Plaix	7	2	6	6	6
(Germany) Wetzel	1	1	1
3	(United States) Tilden	6	6	6

Third round
(United States) Coen	2	8	6	6
(United Kingdom) Collins	6	6	2	0
(France) Du Plaix	3	4	0
3	(United States) Tilden	6	6	6

Fourth round
(United States) Coen	6	7	3	1	0
3	(United States) Tilden	2	5	6	6	6

==== Section 7 ====
First round

Second round
(United States) Covington	3	1	6
(France) Magaloff	6	6	8
(France) Thurneyssen	3	4	3
(Netherlands) Timmer	6	6	6
(France) Martin-Legeay	1	4	1
10	(Hungary) Von Kehrling	6	6	6
(France) Goldschmidt	0	0	0
7	(United Kingdom) Austin	6	6	6

Third round
(France) Magaloff	2	3	6	1
(Netherlands) Timmer	6	6	1	6
10	(Hungary) Von Kehrling	4	6	2	6	7
7	(United Kingdom) Austin	6	1	6	3	5

Fourth round
(Netherlands) Timmer	6	1	0	2
10	(Hungary) Von Kehrling	4	6	6	6

==== Section 8 ====
First round

Second round
(France) Feret	3	6	6	6
(Italy) Serventi	6	3	0	0
(France) Samazeuilh	4	2	0	r
15	(Germany) Prenn	6	6	2
(Romania) Mishu	6	8	0	1	r
Dannon	2	6	6	2
(New Zealand) Andrews
2	(France) Lacoste

Third round
(France) Feret
15	(Germany) Prenn
Dannon	2	0	0
2	(France) Lacoste	6	6	6

Fourth round
(France) Feret	1	6	2	2
2	(France) Lacoste	6	4	6	6

Preceded by 1929 Australian Championships – Men's singles	Grand Slam men's singles	Succeeded by 1929 Wimbledon Championships – Men's singles
