= Harry Ramberg =

Swedish tennis player (1909–2001)

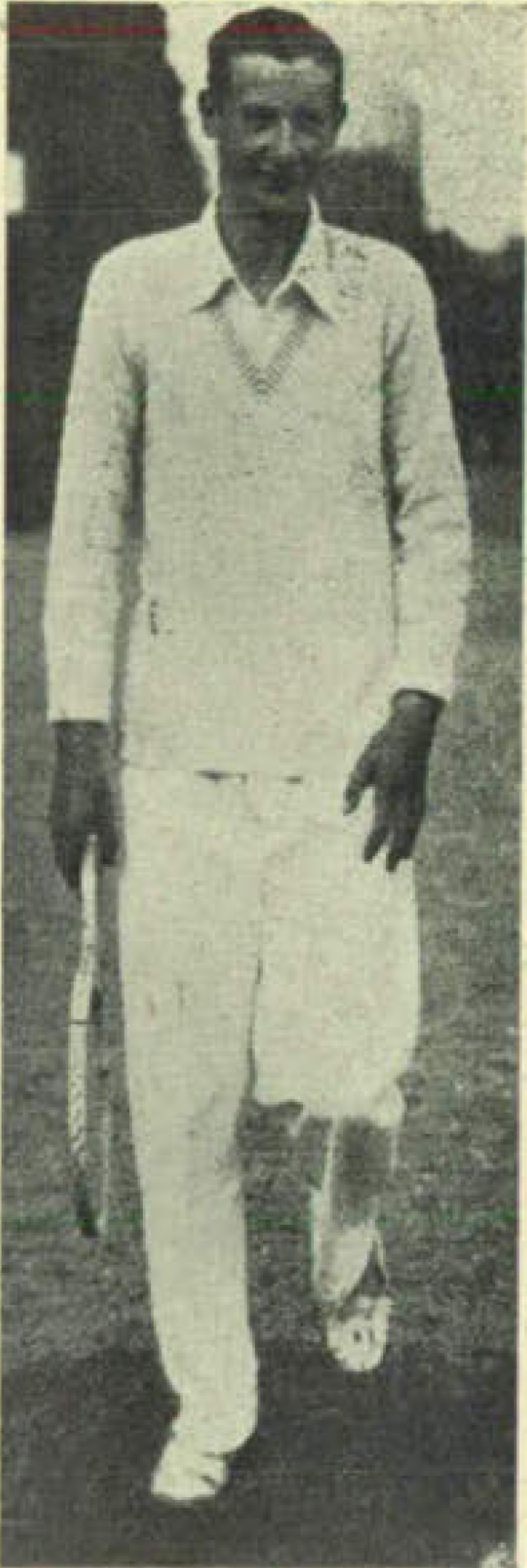
- Harry Ramberg in the Stockholm-Budapest team challenge
- Country (sports): Sweden
- Born: 6 April 1909; Stockholm, Sweden
- Died: 25 August 2001 (aged 92)
- Turned pro: 1927 (amateur tour)
- Retired: 1935
- Plays: Right-handed

Singles

Grand Slam singles results
- Wimbledon: 1R (1929)

Doubles

Grand Slam doubles results
- Wimbledon: 1R (1929)

Team competitions
- Davis Cup: 2R (1933)
- Last updated on: 23 October 2012.

Harry Ramberg (Swedish pronunciation: [ˈhæ̌rːʏ ˈrâmːbærj]; 6 April 1909 – 25 August 2001) was a Swedish tennis player. A two-time Swedish singles national champion in 1931 and 1933, Ramberg was also a seven times doubles champion with Curt Östberg between 1927–33 and also national covered court champion between 1929–33 and one-time mixed doubles indoors champion with Eyvor Aquilon in 1933. He won the Swedish King's Cup in 1930, 1931 and 1932

== Tennis career ==
Born Stockholm, in his early career he won the Swedish under 16 junior national championships in 1924.

In July 1927 he and Curt Östberg secured the doubles titles in Saltsjöbaden and in Lysekil. He appeared in the international tennis scene as he was drafted in the Nordisk Cup against Denmark. Ramberg made a successful debut with the help of Swedish tennis legend Sune Malmström against Axel Petersen and Arne Velschow-Rasmussen.

In August 1928 Ramberg and Östberg took the Saltsjöbaden Masters Cup in doubles. In an inter-club match between Stockholms Allmänna Lawntennis Klubb and Oslo they were defeated by the Christoffersen-Fagerström duo.

In July 1929 he was on the main draw of the 1929 Wimbledon Championships however he made an early exit against the Australian Clifford Stirling Colvin. In doubles the Ramberg-Östberg pair fell victim to Englishmen Charles Kingsley and John Olliff. In a non-Davis Cup match-up of Denmark against Sweden in 1929, which was won by the latter three to two. Ramberg was included in the doubles match alongside Curt Östberg against Einer Ulrich and Fritz Gleerup, and swept a clean victory. In March he clinched the Stockholm doubles Championship with Östberg and also took the mixed doubles. In June he reached the quarterfinals of the Dutch Championships and eventually lost to Hendrik Timmer. He reached the doubles semifinal there after eliminating the Hungarian team of Kálmán Kirchmäyer and Béla Halter. In August in the Saltsjöbaden tournament he captured the doubles title with Östberg but had to withdraw from the mixed doubles final giving his opponents a walkover. In November the team of Budapest challenged the city of Stockholm. Östberg and Ramberg defeated the seasoned Hungarian veterans Béla von Kehrling and Pál Aschner in four sets giving the home team a two-one lead.

In April 1930 at the Stockholm Indoors he teamed up with Östberg again for the doubles, in which they prevailed but faced each other for the mixed title with Östberg and his partner getting the triumph in the end. In May he was featured in the Davis Cup match against the Yugoslavia but lost all three of his rubbers. In August at the Stockholm Outdoors he won the doubles event with Östberg. In a non-Davis Cup team covered court competition in November in Mannheim Sweden annihilated Germany four to one. Ramberg defeated hometown player Philip Buss but fell to Walter Dessart in the next match. The same month in Stockholm in the second unofficial team encounter against Denmark he lost to both Ulrich and Henriksen

In early 1931 the touring Racing Club de Paris visited and Stockholm and members of the famous French Four Musketeers, Jacques Brugnon and Christian Boussus challenged the doubles team of Ramberg-Östberg and overcame them in four close sets. In February 1931 an England-Sweden international match was held in Stockholm whereas the English duo of Fred Perry and Harry Lee pushed the Ramberg-Östberg pair in a five set thriller and subdued them six to one in the deciding set. In April he lost the Stockholm Mixed Indoors again to Davis Cup partner Östberg but defended their doubles title together. On the annual Nordisk Cup of August (Denmark versus Sweden) Ramberg lost in singles against Arne Velschow-Rasmussen but equalized in doubles with Östberg against Velschow-Rasmussen – Gleerup. The same month he claimed the Stockholm outdoors from Östberg, the doubles title with him but had to cede the mixed title to him.

In 1932 France beat Sweden in Stockholm, Ramberg lost to Antoine Gentien and Jacques Brugnon in two singles and one doubles rubber respectively. The same year Sweden beat Germany, Ramberg scored victories against Dessart and Eberhard Nourney. In April with his partner Östberg he took his second the indoors crown but failed in the mixed final again to Östberg. In the Djursholm Championships Östberg took the title ahead of Ramberg but as usual they together proved to be unstoppable in doubles. In November the ensemble of professionals of the Tilden Tennis Company arrived to Sweden and organized a series of matches against the amateurs. Bill Tilden battled Ramberg and won in straight sets. On the other hand Ramberg and Östberg defeated the pro teams of Tilden and Bruce Barnes and the German duo of Hans Nüsslein and Roman Najuch. In the end of the year in the Danish-Swedish challenge Ramberg lost in singles and doubles as well although this time he chose to play with Ingvar Garell.

In April 1933 Östberg and Ramberg claimed their third Stockholm indoors doubles and Ramberg his first and only mixed title with Eyvor Aquilon. In August in the final of the Nordisk Cup he handed Sweden's first win against Ragnar Hagen but served a doubles loss against Hagen-Johan Haanes. In 1934 the team travelled to Djursholm to play the second round meeting of the 1934 International Lawn Tennis Challenge against the Belgium Davis Cup team. Ramberg won one rubber and lost two other resulting in a one rubber difference loss of Sweden. He stayed in the city and a week later he won the singles and doubles of the city tournament.

In February 1934 he represented the Stockholms Allmänna Lawntennis Klubb against the Allmänna Idrottsklubben winning two matches including the doubles with Östberg and losing one. In March he couldn't defend his indoors doubles trophy in Stockholm giving opponents Kalle Schröder and Ingvar Garell their first feat. In May in the semifinal of the Nordisk Cup against Norway, Johan Haanes took revenge in singles for his last year's loss. In September at the annual nationals he was dethroned again in doubles by Schröder and Garell.

In 1935 he was a contender for the mixed doubles title with Miss Aquilon and lost in three sets.

== Personal life ==
Harry Ramberg was born on 6 April 1909 in Stockholm to Georg Harald Ramberg and Rhea Ramberg (Aronowitsch), a dentist couple. He married Kerstin Eggert in 1935. They had three children Clas-Göran (born 1936), Monica (born 1940) and Gunilla (born 1943). He had a sister Anna-Lisa, who married to his Davis Cup teammate Ingvar Garell.

== See also ==
- List of Sweden Davis Cup team representatives
