= Neppach =

Neppach may refer to

- Nelly Neppach (1898–1933), German tennis player
- Robert Neppach (1890–1938), Austrian film architect and producer
