= 1930 French Championships – Men's singles =

Men's singles
- 1930 French Championships

Final
- Champion: (France) Henri Cochet
- Runner-up: (United States) Bill Tilden
- Score: 3–6, 8–6, 6–3, 6–1

Details
- Draw: 81
- Seeds: 16

Events
Singles	men	women
Doubles	men	women
← 1929 ·	French Championships	· 1931 →

First-seeded Henri Cochet defeated Bill Tilden 3–6, 8–6, 6–3, 6–1 in the final to win the men's singles tennis title at the 1930 French Championships.

== Seeds ==
The seeded players are listed below. Henri Cochet is the champion; others show the round in which they were eliminated.

1. (France) Henri Cochet (champion)
2. (United States) Bill Tilden (finalist)
3. (France) Jean Borotra (semifinals)
4. (Italy) Umberto De Morpurgo (semifinals)
5. (Australia) Edgar Moon (quarterfinals)
6. (Australia) Jack Crawford (second round)
7. (Republic of Ireland) George Rogers Lyttelton (quarterfinals)
8. (France) André Merlin (second round)
9. (Australia) Harry Hopman (quarterfinals)
10. (France) Emmanuel Du Plaix (fourth round)
11. (Monaco) Vladimir Landau (third round)
12. (France) Jacques Brugnon (third round)
13. (United States) Wilbur Coen (fourth round)
14. (Japan) Yoshiro Ota (fourth round)
15. (Austria) Franz Matejka (second round)
16. (Germany) Otto Froitzheim (second round)

== Draw ==
=== Key ===
- Q = Qualifier
- WC = Wild card
- LL = Lucky loser
- r = Retired

=== Finals ===
Quarterfinals
1	(France) Henri Cochet	6	2	6	6
9	(Australia) Harry Hopman	1	6	3	3
4	(Italy) Umberto De Morpurgo	6	6	4	2	6
5	(Australia) Edgar Moon	2	2	6	6	3
(United Kingdom) Colin Gregory	4	4	3
3	(France) Jean Borotra	6	6	6
7	(Republic of Ireland) George Lyttleton-Rogers	1	1	5
2	(United States) Bill Tilden	6	6	7

Semifinals
1	(France) Henri Cochet	7	6	6
4	(Italy) Umberto De Morpurgo	5	1	2
3	(France) Jean Borotra	6	2	4	6	3
2	(United States) Bill Tilden	2	6	6	4	6

Final
1	(France) Henri Cochet	3	8	6	6
2	(United States) Bill Tilden	6	6	3	1

=== Earlier rounds ===
==== Section 1 ====
First round

Second round
1	(France) Cochet
Clarke
(France) Couiteas	2	8	6	6
(Belgium) Ewbank	6	6	4	2
16	(Germany) Froitzheim
(Peru) Rivero Ferro	w/o
(France) Aslangul	6	6	6
8	(France) Merlin	1	2	0

Third round
1	(France) Cochet
(France) Couiteas
(Peru) Rivero Ferro	0	1	1
(France) Aslangul	6	6	6

Fourth round
1	(France) Cochet	3	6	6	6
(France) Aslangul	6	4	2	2

==== Section 2 ====
First round

Second round
(Japan) Harada
(Portugal) Pinto Coelho
(France) Berthet	2	2	4
9	(Australia) Hopman	6	6	6
(United Kingdom) Lee	6	6	6
(Chile) Torralva-Ponsa	4	3	3
(France) Gentien	2	3	8	6	6
(France) Magaloff	6	6	6	2	3

Third round
(Japan) Harada	5	6	3	4
9	(Australia) Hopman	7	4	6	6
(United Kingdom) Lee	6	1	6	6
(France) Gentien	4	6	4	4

Fourth round
9	(Australia) Hopman	6	6	6
(United Kingdom) Lee	3	0	4

==== Section 3 ====
First round

Second round
4	(Italy) De Morpurgo	5	6	6	2
(France) George	7	2	4	6	r
(Japan) Abe	6	7	6
(France) Thurneyssen	1	5	2
13	(United States) Coen
(Belgium) De Borman
(France) Glasser
(Austria) Salm

Third round
4	(Italy) De Morpurgo	6	6	6
(Japan) Abe	2	1	3
13	(United States) Coen	6	6	6
(France) Glasser	0	2	3

Fourth round
4	(Italy) De Morpurgo	6	6	6
13	(United States) Coen	3	4	1

==== Section 4 ====
First round
5	(Australia) Moon	6	3	7	9
Renard	3	6	5	7
(United States) Law	1	2	2
(France) Lesueur	6	6	6
(France) Piel	6	8	6
(France) Bernard	0	6	4
(France) Augustin	3	1	5
(France) Landry	6	6	7
12	(France) Brugnon	6	6	6
(India) Singh	2	0	0
(Denmark) Rasmussen	6	2	6	6
(France) Aron	4	6	2	1
Siedoff
(Germany) Kleinschroth
(France) Siguier	8	7	6	2	6
(France) Guillemot	6	9	3	6	3

Second round
5	(Australia) Moon	2	6	3	6	6
(France) Lesueur	6	1	6	1	2
(France) Piel	6	7	0	1	4
(France) Landry	2	5	6	6	6
12	(France) Brugnon	6	6	6
(Denmark) Rasmussen	4	3	2
(Germany) Kleinschroth	6	6	6
(France) Siguier	4	2	2

Third round
5	(Australia) Moon	6	6	4	6
(France) Landry	2	2	6	2
12	(France) Brugnon	2	2	r
(Germany) Kleinschroth	6	6

Fourth round
5	(Australia) Moon	2	6	6	6
(Germany) Kleinschroth	6	2	4	0

==== Section 5 ====
First round
(Austria) Artens	6	6	6
(Egypt) Riches	2	0	4
(France) Bonte
(France) De Buzelet
Rebois
(France) Goldschmidt
Rar	3	1	5
(Germany) Prenn	6	6	7
11	(Monaco) Landau	7	7	6
(France) Albarran	5	5	1
(France) Grandguillot
(France) Gerbault
(United Kingdom) Gregory	2	6	6	6
(Japan) Sato	6	1	3	4
(France) Terrier	6	4	2
6	(Australia) Crawford	8	6	6

Second round
(Austria) Artens	6	6	4	6
(France) Bonte	4	1	6	2
(France) Goldschmidt	0	4	r
(Germany) Prenn	6	6
11	(Monaco) Landau	6	1	3	6	6
(France) Grandguillot	3	6	6	3	2
(United Kingdom) Gregory	6	6	6
6	(Australia) Crawford	3	2	3

Third round
(Austria) Artens	6	2	6	2
(Germany) Prenn	8	6	4	6
11	(Monaco) Landau
(United Kingdom) Gregory

Fourth round
(Germany) Prenn	6	0	6	3	3
(United Kingdom) Gregory	1	6	4	6	6

==== Section 6 ====
First round
(France) Combemale	3	6	6	5	3
(United Kingdom) Collins	6	4	3	7	6

Second round
(United Kingdom) Collins	6	6	5	2	6
(France) Féret	2	2	7	6	4
(France) Rodel	3	6	4
14	(Japan) Ota	6	3	6
(Jamaica) Leahong	1	2	5
(France) Samazeuilh	6	6	7
(Monaco) Galeppe	6	4	6	5
3	(France) Borotra	8	6	3	7

Third round
(United Kingdom) Collins	0	2	2
14	(Japan) Ota	6	6	6
(France) Samazeuilh	6	3	4	6	1
3	(France) Borotra	3	6	6	3	6

Fourth round
14	(Japan) Ota	7	6	4	1	7
3	(France) Borotra	5	3	6	6	9

==== Section 7 ====
First round

Second round
(Egypt) Zahar	2	2	2
(France) Martin-Legeay	6	6	6
(Belgium) Lacroix	4	4	6	4
10	(France) Du Plaix	6	6	3	6
(Switzerland) Chiesa	6	8	6	6
(France) Laurent	8	6	2	4
(Norway) Nielsen	1	6	1	9
7	(Republic of Ireland) Rogers Lyttelton	6	2	6	11

Third round
(France) Martin-Legeay	4	3	2
10	(France) Du Plaix	6	6	6
(Switzerland) Chiesa	7	6	1	10
7	(Republic of Ireland) Rogers Lyttelton	9	2	6	12

Fourth round
10	(France) Du Plaix	6	3	4	6	1
7	(Republic of Ireland) Rogers Lyttelton	3	6	6	3	6

==== Section 8 ====
First round

Second round
(Japan) Miki	2	6	4	3
(Australia) Willard	6	3	6	6
(United Kingdom) Hughes	6	6	4	6
15	(Austria) Matejka	4	4	6	4
(Egypt) Danon	0	1	1
(Romania) Mishu	6	6	6
(Germany) Nourney	0	1	2
2	(United States) Tilden	6	6	6

Third round
(Australia) Willard	2	0	6	2
(United Kingdom) Hughes	6	6	4	6
(Romania) Mishu	3	0	2
2	(United States) Tilden	6	6	6

Fourth round
(United Kingdom) Hughes	1	10	5	3
2	(United States) Tilden	6	8	7	6

Preceded by 1930 Australian Championships – Men's singles	Grand Slam men's singles	Succeeded by 1930 Wimbledon Championships – Men's singles
