= Wilbur Coen =

American tennis player

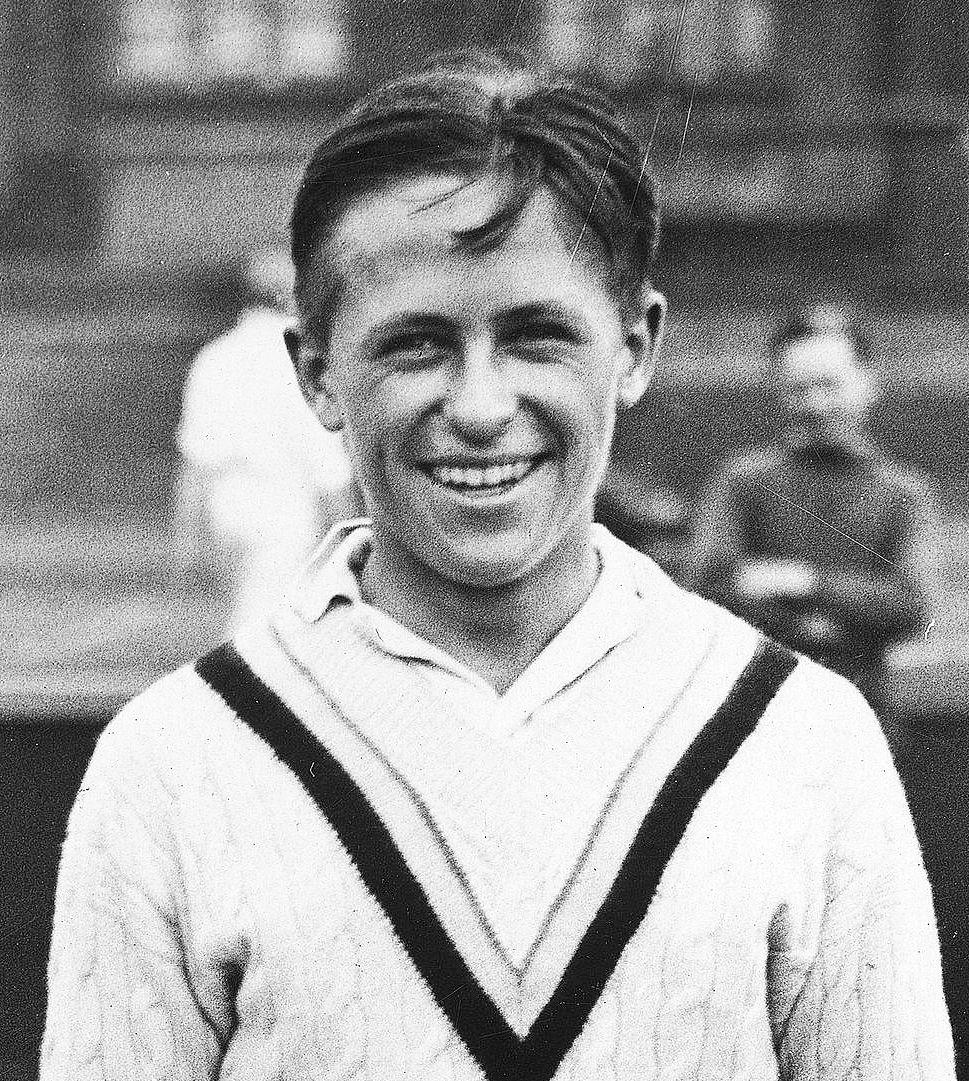
- Coen in 1928
- Full name: Wilbur Franklyn Coen Jr
- Country (sports): United States
- Born: December 23, 1911 Kansas City, Missouri, U.S.
- Died: February 5, 1998 (aged 86)

Singles

Grand Slam singles results
- French Open: 4R (1929, 1930)
- Wimbledon: 3R (1928, 1929)
- US Open: 4R (1929)

Wilbur Franklyn Coen Jr (known also as Junior Coen, 23 December 1911 – 5 February 1998) was an American tennis player. In 1928, at age 16 years, 156 days, he became the youngest tennis player to ever represent the United States in the Davis Cup, and the youngest player to ever compete in a Davis Cup match, both records he still holds. Coen also competed at Wimbledon in 1928 and 29, twice reaching the third round. In The French Championships he reached the fourth round in 1929 and 1930, and in the US Championships he reached the fourth round in 1929.

Coen was mentored by Bill Tilden. In 1930 he won the doubles title with Tilden at the inaugural Italian Open in Milan. That same year he was a runner-up in singles at the U.S. Men's Clay Court Championships, losing the final in straight sets to Bryan Grant.
