= Emmanuel du Plaix =

French tennis player

Emmanue du Plaix
- Full name: Emmanuel Tailhandier du Plaix
- Country (sports): France
- Born: 28 August 1902; Bourges, France
- Died: 22 March 1973 (aged 70)
- Plays: Right-handed

Singles

Grand Slam singles results
- French Open: 4R (1930)
- Wimbledon: 2R (1930)

Emmanuel Tailhandier du Plaix (28 August 1902 – 22 March 1973) was a French tennis player.

Born in Bourges in central France, du Plaix ranked as high as fifth in the country. In 1930 he won Wimbledon's All England Plate and reached the fourth round of the French Championships for the only time. He lost a five set match to Gottfried von Cramm at the 1931 French Championships. His career singles titles include the South of France Championships in 1929, Bavarian Championships in 1930 and Austrian International Championships in 1932.
