= Josef Maleček =

Czechoslovak ice hockey player (1903–1982)

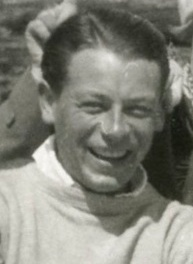
- Born: 18 June 1903 Prague, Austria-Hungary
- Died: 26 September 1982 (aged 79) Bayport, New York, United States
- Height: 175 cm (5 ft 9 in)
- Weight: 72 kg (159 lb; 11 st 5 lb)
- Position: Centre
- Shot: Left
- National team: Czechoslovakia
- Playing career: 1920–1950

Josef Maleček (18 June 1903 – 26 September 1982) was a Czechoslovak multiple-sport athlete, who played ice hockey and tennis internationally.

He was born in Prague and died in Bayport, New York, United States. In 1924 he participated with the Czechoslovak team in the first Winter Olympics ice hockey tournament. Four years later he was a member of the Czechoslovak team which participated in the 1928 Olympics ice hockey tournament. In 1936 he finished fourth with the Czechoslovak team in the Olympic ice hockey tournament. After communist takeover in Czechoslovakia (1948) he emigrated from the country. He was posthumously inducted into the IIHF Hall of Fame in 2003.

Maleček was also a tennis player, who competed in both the Wimbledon and French Championships in the early 1930s. Maleček also represented Czechoslovakia at the Davis Cup.
