= Ingvar Garell =

Swedish tennis player

- Country (sports): Sweden
- Born: 10 December 1901; Råda parish, Gothenburg, Sweden
- Died: 28 May 1979 (aged 77); Stockholm, Sweden
- Plays: Right–handed

Team competitions
- Davis Cup: QF (Europe) (1926)

Ingvar Elof Garell (10 December 1901 – 28 May 1979) was a Swedish tennis player who was active in the 1920s and 1930s.

== Tennis career ==
Garell represented the Swedish Davis Cup team in 1926, 1927 and 1928. His first match in 1926 was during the Europe Zone quarterfinal against South Africa at the Melbury Lawn Tennis Club in Kensington, England, where he and his teammate, Sune Malmström, won 5–0. In the 1927 Europe Zone first round, he again teamed up with Malmström and suffered a 4–1 loss against Great Britain. Garell's last Davis Cup appearance was in the 1928 Europe Zone second round defeat against Czechoslovakia. He played a total of 7 Davis Cup matches and won 2.

== See also ==
- List of Sweden Davis Cup team representatives
