= Curt Östberg =

Swedish tennis player (1905–1969)

- Country (sports): Sweden
- Born: 17 February 1905; Stockholm, Sweden
- Died: 30 March 1969 (aged 64); Västerleds parish, Bromma, Sweden
- Turned pro: 1928(amateur tour)
- Retired: 1937
- Plays: Right–handed

Singles

Grand Slam singles results
- Wimbledon: 1R (1929, 1934)

Doubles

Grand Slam doubles results
- Wimbledon: 1R (1929, 1934)

Curt Mauritz Axel Östberg (17 February 1905 – 30 March 1969) was a Swedish tennis player.

== Tennis career ==
Östberg represented the Swedish Davis Cup team in 1929, 1933–34 and 1936–37. His first match in 1929 was against South Africa in Saltsjobaden, where he and his teammates, Sune Malmström and Henning Muller, suffered a 5–0 loss. He played a total of 17 matches and won 6 of them. Three of the wins were in doubles with his partner Kalle Schröder. In 1946 he was appointed as non-playing captain for the Swedish team.

Östberg made two appearances at the Wimbledon Championships, in 1929 and 1934, losing in the first round on both occasions.

== See also ==
- List of Sweden Davis Cup team representatives
