= Nelly Neppach =

German tennis player

- Neppach in 1925
- Country (sports): Germany
- Born: 16 September 1898 Frankfurt am Main, Germany
- Died: 7 May 1933 (aged 34) Berlin, Germany
- Plays: Right-handed

Grand Slam singles results
- French Open: 3R (1927)

Grand Slam doubles results
- French Open: 2R (1927)

Nelly Neppach (née Bamberger; German pronunciation: [ˈnɛli] ˈnɛpaːχ]; 16 September 1898 – 7 May 1933) was a German female tennis player. Neppach was the first German female to establish an international reputation. Some weeks after Hitler had become Reichskanzler (30 January 1933), she was forced out of the sport by the Nazi regime. She committed suicide at age 34.

== Biography ==
Neppach was born into a Jewish family in Frankfurt am Main in 1898. She began playing tennis in her early youth and won her first title in 1910, aged 12.

After World War I, Neppach married film architect and producer Robert Neppach and moved to Berlin, where she joined the sports club Tennis Borussia Berlin.

In 1924 and 1925, Neppach won the singles title at the German Indoor Championships. In 1925, she reached her greatest success by beating Ilse Friedleben in the final of the German Championships at Hamburg in three sets. That year she won eight out of nine possible titles at German championships and was co-ranked No. 1 in Germany with Friedleben. In 1926, she was invited by Suzanne Lenglen to play international tournaments at the French Riviera at a time German players were still banned from international tournaments as a consequence of World War I. Neppach traveled to France despite a warning from the German tennis federation and played matches against Lenglen as well as U.S. legend Helen Wills. However, when the German tennis federation issued a second warning on her unauthorized trip, she cancelled her participation in the Nice tournament and returned to Germany, where she was briefly banned from playing tennis.

At her only appearance on a major tournament at the 1927 French Championships, she reached the third round, losing to Eileen Bennett in three sets. During the following years, Neppach's and Ilse Friedleben's place at the top of German women's tennis was taken by younger and more successful players like Cilly Aussem and Hilde Krahwinkel. In this period, Neppach mainly focused on doubles events, but still ranked ninth nationwide in singles in 1932.

== End of career ==
On 11 April 1933, ten weeks after the Nazi Regime had seized power in Germany on 30 January, Neppach, who was Jewish, quit her membership at Tennis Borussia. Although the circumstances of this decision are not known in detail, she was almost certainly forced to do so, as most German tennis clubs at that time expelled their Jewish members. On 24. April 1933, the German tennis federation announced that Jewish players were no longer allowed to play international tournaments.

Neppach was the first German female tennis player who had gained international appreciation.

== Death ==
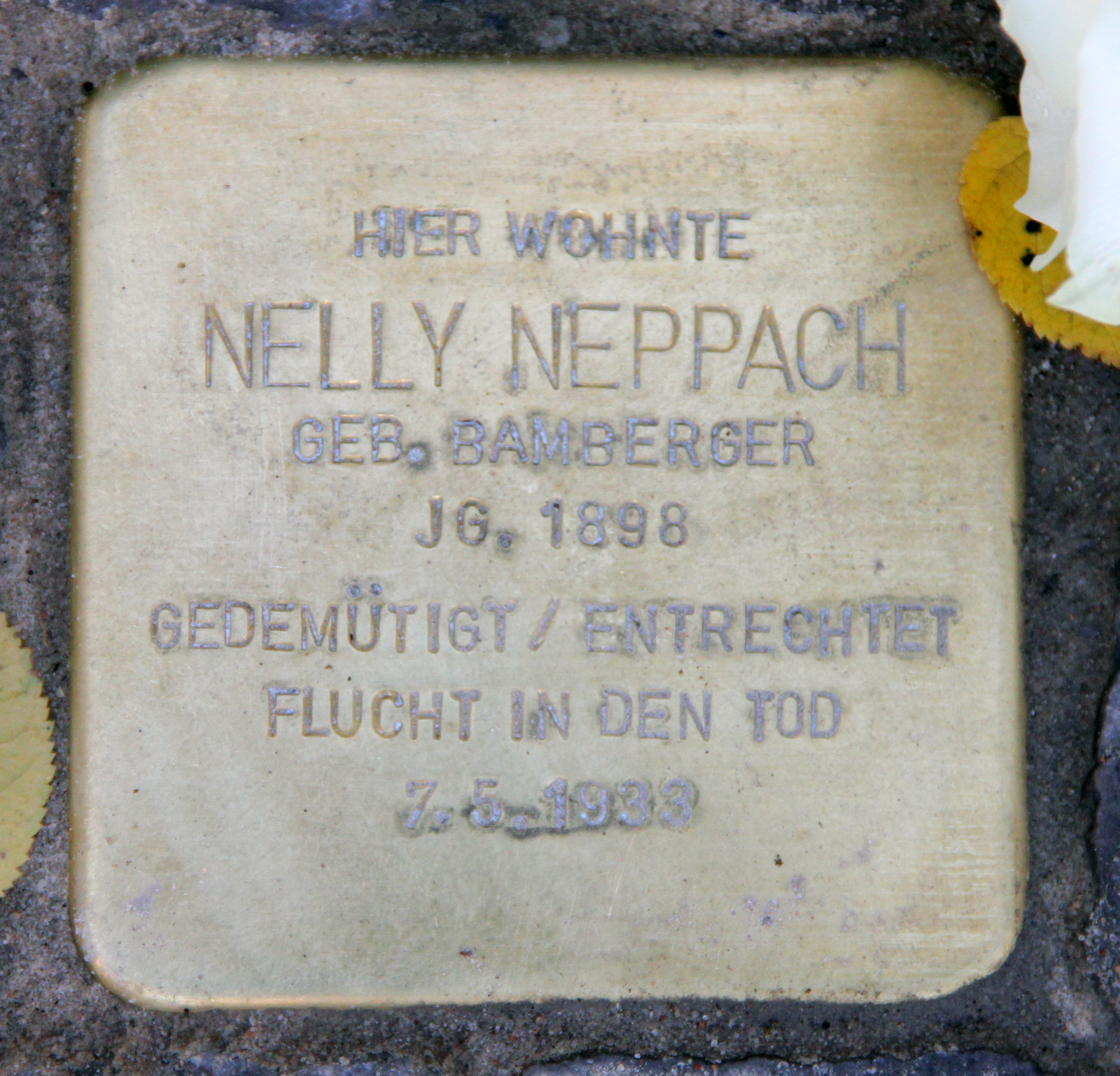
Stolperstein outside Neppach's home at Nachodstraße 22, Berlin

On the night of 7/8 May 1933, Neppach, faced with increasing discrimination and persecution of Jewish people in Germany and her isolation from tennis in particular, took her life in her flat at Berlin using Barbital and town gas. Antisemitism — in 1935 to be codified as the Nuremberg Laws — invaded all aspects of life in Germany, and sport was no exception. Neppach's was among a rash of Jewish suicides, which were reported with alarm abroad. "It is impossible to publish a complete list of the suicides brought about by Nazi brutality," wrote the Hebrew Standard of Australasia in mentioning her death.

In October 2015 a stolperstein was placed near her former home in Berlin to commemorate Nelly Neppach and her husband.
