= 1928 International Lawn Tennis Challenge Europe Zone =

International tennis competition

The Europe Zone was one of the two regional zones of the 1928 International Lawn Tennis Challenge.

27 teams entered the Europe Zone, with the winner going on to compete in the Inter-Zonal Final against the winner of the America Zone. Italy defeated Czechoslovakia in the final, and went on to face the United States in the Inter-Zonal Final.

== Draw ==
First Round; 7 April–12 May
Switzerland
bye
India
bye
Romania	5
Belgium	0
Italy	4
Australia	1
Yugoslavia	1
Finland	4
Great Britain	4
Argentina	1
Germany	4
Greece	1
Spain	3
Chile	2
Poland	0
Denmark	5
Austria	4
Philippines	1
Norway	0
Hungary	5
Ireland	0
Netherlands	5
Sweden	w/o
South Africa
bye
Czechoslovakia
bye
Portugal
bye
New Zealand

Second Round; 11–26 May
Zürich, Switzerland
Switzerland	2
India	3
Rome, Italy (clay)
Romania	0
Italy	4
Helsinki, Finland (clay)
Finland	0
Great Britain	5
Berlin, Germany (clay)
Germany	3
Spain	2
Copenhagen, Denmark
Denmark	1
Austria	4
Noordwijk, Netherlands (clay)
Hungary	2
Netherlands	3
Stockholm, Sweden
Sweden	1
Czechoslovakia	4
Lisbon, Portugal (clay)
Portugal	1
New Zealand	4

Quarterfinals; 7–11 June
Turin, Italy (clay)
India	1
Italy	4
Birmingham, England (grass)
Great Britain	4
Germany	1
The Hague, Netherlands (clay)
Austria	0
Netherlands	3
Czechoslovakia	w/o
New Zealand

Semifinals; 20–24 June
Felixstowe, England (grass)
Italy	4
Great Britain	1
Prague, Czechoslovakia
Netherlands	2
Czechoslovakia	3

Final; 13–15 July
Milan, Italy (clay)
Italy	3
Czechoslovakia	2

== First round ==
=== Romania vs. Belgium ===
Romania
5
Bucharest, Romania
4–6 May 1928
Clay

Belgium
0

			1	2	3	4	5
1	(Romania) (Belgium)	Gheorghe Lupu; Andre Ewbank	6; 3	7; 9	7; 5	7; 9	6; 3
2	(Romania) (Belgium)	Nicolae Mișu; Maurice Iwiens-d'Eeckhoutte	6; 3	8; 6	3; 6	6; 3
3	(Romania) (Belgium)	Laszlo Dorner / Nicolae Mișu; Andre Ewbank / André Lacroix	6; 4	4; 6	6; 2	7; 5
4	(Romania) (Belgium)	Nicolae Mișu; Andre Ewbank	6; 4	6; 1	6; 4
5	(Romania) (Belgium)	Gheorghe Lupu; Maurice Iwiens-d'Eeckhoutte	3; 6	4; 6	6; 4	6; 4	6; 0

=== Italy vs. Australia ===
Italy
4
Genoa, Italy
4–9 May 1928
Clay

Australia
1

			1	2	3	4	5
1	(Italy) (Australia)	Uberto De Morpurgo; Jack Crawford	7; 5	6; 3	6; 2
2	(Italy) (Australia)	Giorgio de Stefani; Gerald Patterson	1; 6	3; 6	3; 6
3	(Italy) (Australia)	Placido Gaslini / Uberto De Morpurgo; Harry Hopman / Gerald Patterson	6; 3	6; 4	1; 6	1; 6	6; 2
4	(Italy) (Australia)	Uberto De Morpurgo; Gerald Patterson	1; 6	6; 4	6; 3	2; 6	6; 1
5	(Italy) (Australia)	Giorgio de Stefani; Harry Hopman	7; 5	8; 6	10; 8

=== Yugoslavia vs. Finland ===
Yugoslavia
1
Zagreb, Yugoslavia
4–6 May 1928

Finland
4

			1	2	3	4	5
1	(Kingdom of Yugoslavia) (Finland)	Franjo Šefer; Arne Grahn	2; 6	0; 6	1; 6
2	(Kingdom of Yugoslavia) (Finland)	Aleksandar Popović; Bo Grotenfelt	4; 6	6; 1	3; 6	5; 7
3	(Kingdom of Yugoslavia) (Finland)	Aleksandar Popović / Franjo Šefer; Arne Grahn / Bo Grotenfelt	2; 6	2; 6	6; 8
4	(Kingdom of Yugoslavia) (Finland)	Aleksandar Popović; Arne Grahn	2; 6	2; 6	2; 6
5	(Kingdom of Yugoslavia) (Finland)	Franjo Šefer; Bo Grotenfelt	6; 3	2; 6	9; 7	7; 5

=== Great Britain vs. Argentina ===
Great Britain
4
Abbey Park Gardens, Torquay, England
3–5 May 1928
Clay

Argentina
1

			1	2	3	4	5
1	(United Kingdom) (Argentina)	Colin Gregory; Guillermo Robson	10; 12	13; 11	6; 3	8; 6
2	(United Kingdom) (Argentina)	Edward Higgs; Ronaldo Boyd	3; 6	6; 4	3; 6	3; 6
3	(United Kingdom) (Argentina)	Gordon Crole-Rees / Cyril Eames; Ronaldo Boyd / Guillermo Robson	6; 4	6; 1	9; 11	1; 6	7; 5
4	(United Kingdom) (Argentina)	Colin Gregory; Ronaldo Boyd	6; 4	11; 9	6; 2
5	(United Kingdom) (Argentina)	Edward Higgs; Guillermo Robson	7; 5	6; 2	2; 6	7; 5

=== Germany vs. Greece ===
Germany
4
Munich, Germany
4–6 May 1928

Greece
1

			1	2	3	4	5
1	(Germany) (Greece)	Phillip Buss; Augustos Zerlendis	7; 5	6; 4	4; 6	6; 2
2	(Germany) (Greece)	Otto Froitzheim; Max Balli	3; 6	6; 3	6; 1	9; 7
3	(Germany) (Greece)	Curt Bergmann / Heinrich Kleinschroth; Max Balli / Augustos Zerlendis	6; 1	6; 3	6; 4
4	(Germany) (Greece)	Phillip Buss; Max Balli	6; 1	6; 4	6; 4
5	(Germany) (Greece)	Otto Froitzheim; Augustos Zerlendis	1; 6	3; 6	6; 4	6; 4	1; 6

=== Spain vs. Chile ===
Spain
3
Real Club de Tenis Barcelona, Barcelona, Spain
7–9 April 1928
Clay

Chile
2

			1	2	3	4	5
1	(Spain) (Chile)	Francisco Sindreu; Domingo Torralva Ponsa	6; 3	6; 2	3; 6	6; 3
2	(Spain) (Chile)	Antonio Juanico; Luis Torralva Ponsa	4; 6	2; 6	2; 6
3	(Spain) (Chile)	Eduardo Flaquer / Raimundo Morales Marqués; Domingo Torralva Ponsa / Luis Torralva Ponsa	6; 4	2; 6	6; 3	7; 9	2; 6
4	(Spain) (Chile)	Francisco Sindreu; Luis Torralva Ponsa	6; 4	7; 5	6; 4
5	(Spain) (Chile)	Antonio Juanico; Domingo Torralva Ponsa	6; 4	4; 6	6; 3	3; 6	6; 1

=== Poland vs. Denmark ===
Poland
0
Warsaw, Poland
4–6 May 1928

Denmark
5

			1	2	3	4	5
1	(Poland) (Denmark)	Jerzy Stolarow; Einer Ulrich	6; 3	4; 6	0; 6	4; 6
2	(Poland) (Denmark)	Przemyslaw Warminski; Axel Petersen	2; 6	6; 3	4; 6	2; 6
3	(Poland) (Denmark)	Jerzy Stolarow / Maksymilian Stolarow; Axel Petersen / Einer Ulrich	1; 6	3; 6	4; 6
4	(Poland) (Denmark)	Przemyslaw Warminski; Einer Ulrich	4; 6	4; 6	6; 8
5	(Poland) (Denmark)	Jerzy Stolarow; Axel Petersen	1; 6	0; 6	2; 6

=== Austria vs. Philippines ===
Austria
4
Vienna, Austria
4–6 May 1928

Philippines
1

			1	2	3	4	5
1	(Austria) (Philippines)	Hermann von Artens; Guillermo Aragon	6; 3	6; 3	6; 3
2	(Austria) (Philippines)	Franz-Wilhelm Matejka; Lope Yngayo	6; 2	6; 2	6; 4
3	(Austria) (Philippines)	Hermann von Artens / Ludwig Salm-Hoogstraeten; Guillermo Aragon / Lope Yngayo	6; 2	11; 13	6; 0	6; 3
4	(Austria) (Philippines)	Hermann von Artens; Lope Yngayo	4; 6	2; 6	6; 1			retired
5	(Austria) (Philippines)	Franz-Wilhelm Matejka; Guillermo Aragon	6; 0	6; 2	6; 3

=== Norway vs. Hungary ===
Norway
0
Oslo, Norway
4–6 May 1928
Clay

Hungary
5

			1	2	3	4	5
1	(Norway) (Hungary)	Rolf Christoffersen; Béla von Kehrling	1; 6	3; 6	1; 6
2	(Norway) (Hungary)	Torleif Torkildsen; Imre Takáts	5; 7	9; 7	4; 6	6; 1	2; 6
3	(Norway) (Hungary)	Rolf Christoffersen / Torleif Torkildsen; Béla von Kehrling / Jenő Péteri	2; 6	2; 6	6; 4	0; 6
4	(Norway) (Hungary)	Torleif Torkildsen; Béla von Kehrling	5; 7	6; 3	3; 6	1; 6
5	(Norway) (Hungary)	Rolf Christoffersen; Imre Takáts	1; 6	1; 6	2; 6

=== Ireland vs. Netherlands ===
Ireland
0
Fitzwilliam Lawn Tennis Club, Dublin, Ireland
10–12 May 1928
Grass

Netherlands
5

			1	2	3	4	5
1	(Republic of Ireland) (Netherlands)	Denis O'Callaghan; Arthur Diemer-Kool	2; 6	7; 5	1; 6	2; 6
2	(Republic of Ireland) (Netherlands)	Charles Scroppe; Hendrik Timmer	2; 6	2; 6	2; 6
3	(Republic of Ireland) (Netherlands)	Denis O'Callaghan / Charles Scroppe; Arthur Diemer-Kool / Hendrik Timmer	4; 6	6; 8	6; 8
4	(Republic of Ireland) (Netherlands)	Charles Scroppe; Arthur Diemer-Kool	6; 3	3; 6	7; 5	1; 6	1; 6
5	(Republic of Ireland) (Netherlands)	Denis O'Callaghan; Hendrik Timmer	1; 6	2; 6	0; 6

== Second round ==
=== Switzerland vs. India ===
Switzerland
2
Zürich, Switzerland
12–14 May 1928

India
3

			1	2	3	4	5
1	(Switzerland) (India)	Charles Aeschlimann; Mohammed Sleem	3; 6	7; 9	2; 6
2	(Switzerland) (India)	Jean Wuarin; E.V. Bobb	3; 6	1; 6	9; 7	3; 6
3	(Switzerland) (India)	Charles Aeschlimann / Maurice Ferrier; Dudley Pitt / Hira-Lal Soni	4; 6	8; 10	6; 3	6; 4	6; 1
4	(Switzerland) (India)	Jean Wuarin; Mohammed Sleem	1; 6	1; 6	4; 6
5	(Switzerland) (India)	Charles Aeschlimann; E.V. Bobb	6; 4	1; 6	6; 4	6; 2

=== Italy vs. Romania ===
Italy
4
Rome, Italy
17–19 May 1928
Clay

Romania
0

			1	2	3	4	5
1	(Italy) (Romania)	Uberto De Morpurgo; Gheorghe Lupu	6; 2	6; 2	6; 2
2	(Italy) (Romania)	Giorgio de Stefani; Laszlo Dorner	6; 3	6; 2	6; 2
3	(Italy) (Romania)	Placido Gaslini / Uberto De Morpurgo; Laszlo Dorner / Gheorghe Lupu	6; 2	6; 4	4; 6	3; 6	6; 4
4	(Italy) (Romania)	Giorgio de Stefani; Gheorghe Lupu	3; 6	6; 4	6; 4	5; 7	9; 7
5	(Italy) (Romania)	Uberto De Morpurgo; Laszlo Dorner						not played

=== Finland vs. Great Britain ===
Finland
0
Helsinki Tennis Club, Helsinki, Finland
18–20 May 1928
Clay

Great Britain
5

			1	2	3	4	5
1	(Finland) (United Kingdom)	Arne Grahn; Colin Gregory	0; 6	6; 1	1; 6	1; 6
2	(Finland) (United Kingdom)	Bo Grotenfelt; Edward Higgs	2; 6	1; 6	6; 2	0; 6
3	(Finland) (United Kingdom)	Arne Grahn / Bo Grotenfelt; Gordon Crole-Rees / Cyril Eames	3; 6	2; 6	2; 6
4	(Finland) (United Kingdom)	Runar Granholm; Colin Gregory	2; 6	1; 6	2; 6
5	(Finland) (United Kingdom)	Arne Grahn; Edward Higgs	6; 4	1; 6	4; 6	4; 6

=== Germany vs. Spain ===
Germany
3
Rot-Weiss Tennis Club, Berlin, Germany
17–19 May 1928
Clay

Spain
2

			1	2	3	4	5
1	(Germany) (Spain)	Hans Moldenhauer; Eduardo Flaquer	6; 4	3; 6	7; 5	6; 3
2	(Germany) (Spain)	Daniel Prenn; Francisco Sindreu	5; 7	6; 2	2; 6	6; 3	6; 4
3	(Germany) (Spain)	Curt Bergmann / Heinrich Kleinschroth; Eduardo Flaquer / Raimundo Morales Marqués	5; 7	3; 6	6; 2	9; 7	1; 6
4	(Germany) (Spain)	Hans Moldenhauer; Francisco Sindreu	4; 6	1; 6	7; 5	6; 1	3; 6
5	(Germany) (Spain)	Daniel Prenn; Eduardo Flaquer	4; 6	6; 3	6; 2	6; 4

=== Denmark vs. Austria ===
Denmark
1
Copenhagen, Denmark
23–26 May 1928

Austria
4

			1	2	3	4	5
1	(Denmark) (Austria)	Axel Petersen; Hermann von Artens	4; 6	2; 6	5; 7
2	(Denmark) (Austria)	Einer Ulrich; Franz-Wilhelm Matejka	1; 6	2; 6	2; 6
3	(Denmark) (Austria)	Povl Henriksen / Einer Ulrich; Hermann von Artens / Ludwig Salm-Hoogstraeten	8; 6	6; 0	11; 9
4	(Denmark) (Austria)	Einer Ulrich; Hermann von Artens	4; 6	4; 6	6; 3	7; 9
5	(Denmark) (Austria)	Axel Petersen; Franz-Wilhelm Matejka	6; 8	2; 6	7; 5	6; 2	3; 6

=== Netherlands vs. Hungary ===
Netherlands
3
Noordwijk, Netherlands
18–20 May 1928
Clay

Hungary
2

			1	2	3	4	5
1	(Netherlands) (Hungary)	Hendrik Timmer; Imre Takáts	6; 2	6; 0	6; 1
2	(Netherlands) (Hungary)	Arthur Diemer-Kool; Béla von Kehrling	5; 7	6; 4	6; 2	1; 6	1; 1	retired
3	(Netherlands) (Hungary)	Ody Koopman / Hendrik Timmer; Béla von Kehrling / Jenő Péteri	1; 6	6; 4	6; 2	7; 5
4	(Netherlands) (Hungary)	Hendrik Timmer; Béla von Kehrling	6; 3	6; 4	6; 3
5	(Netherlands) (Hungary)	Ody Koopman; Imre Takáts	4; 6	2; 6	5; 7

=== Sweden vs. Czechoslovakia ===
Sweden
1
East Malm Athletic/Soccer Fields, Stockholm, Sweden
17–19 May 1928
Clay

Czechoslovakia
4

			1	2	3	4	5
1	(Sweden) (Czechoslovakia)	Ingvar Garell; Jan Koželuh	6; 8	0; 6	1; 6
2	(Sweden) (Czechoslovakia)	Sune Malmström; Roderich Menzel	3; 6	3; 6	6; 3	5; 7
3	(Sweden) (Czechoslovakia)	Sune Malmström / Charles Wennergren; Jan Koželuh / Pavel Macenauer	0; 6	2; 6	4; 6
4	(Sweden) (Czechoslovakia)	Ingvar Garell; Roderich Menzel	2; 6	0; 6	7; 5	6; 8
5	(Sweden) (Czechoslovakia)	Sune Malmström; Pavel Macenauer	10; 8	1; 6	7; 5	6; 3

=== Portugal vs. New Zealand ===
Portugal
1
Sporting Club, Lisbon, Portugal
11–13 May 1928
Clay

New Zealand
4

			1	2	3	4	5
1	(Portugal) (New Zealand)	José de Verda; Russell Young	6; 2	6; 2	6; 3
2	(Portugal) (New Zealand)	Antonio Pinto-Coelho; Eskell Andrews	3; 6	4; 6	0; 6
3	(Portugal) (New Zealand)	Antonio Casanovas / Fernando Vasconcelos; Eskell Andrews / Russell Young	7; 5	4; 6	2; 6	2; 6
4	(Portugal) (New Zealand)	Antonio Pinto-Coelho; Russell Young	6; 4	1; 6	3; 6	0; 6
5	(Portugal) (New Zealand)	José de Verda; Eskell Andrews	4; 6	3; 6	1; 6

== Quarterfinals ==
=== Italy vs. India ===
Italy
4
Turin, Italy
9–11 June 1928
Clay

India
1

			1	2	3	4	5
1	(Italy) (India)	Uberto De Morpurgo; Mohammed Sleem	6; 3	6; 3	6; 1
2	(Italy) (India)	Giorgio de Stefani; E.V. Bobb	6; 4	6; 1	6; 3
3	(Italy) (India)	Placido Gaslini / Uberto De Morpurgo; E.V. Bobb / Mohammed Sleem	6; 3	6; 3	3; 6	6; 3
4	(Italy) (India)	Uberto De Morpurgo; E.V. Bobb	6; 2	6; 4	6; 4
5	(Italy) (India)	Giorgio de Stefani; Mohammed Sleem	4; 6	6; 8	6; 4	3; 6

=== Great Britain vs. Germany ===
Great Britain
4
Edgbaston Lawn Tennis Society, Birmingham, England
7–9 June 1928
Grass

Germany
1

			1	2	3	4	5
1	(United Kingdom) (Germany)	Edward Higgs; Hans Moldenhauer	6; 4	4; 6	6; 2	0; 6	6; 4
2	(United Kingdom) (Germany)	Colin Gregory; Otto Froitzheim	6; 4	4; 6	6; 0			retired
3	(United Kingdom) (Germany)	Gordon Crole-Rees / Cyril Eames; Heinrich Kleinschroth / Daniel Prenn	7; 5	6; 2	6; 4
4	(United Kingdom) (Germany)	Colin Gregory; Hans Moldenhauer	2; 6	6; 4	3; 6	6; 1	6; 2
5	(United Kingdom) (Germany)	Edward Higgs; Daniel Prenn	6; 3	1; 6	5; 7	6; 2	3; 6

=== Netherlands vs. Austria ===
Netherlands
3
The Hague, Netherlands
7–9 June 1928
Clay

Austria
0

			1	2	3	4	5
1	(Netherlands) (Austria)	Hendrik Timmer; Franz-Wilhelm Matejka	2; 6	5; 7	6; 0	6; 3	6; 4
2	(Netherlands) (Austria)	Arthur Diemer-Kool; Hermann von Artens	6; 3	4; 6	6; 3	3; 6	6; 0
3	(Netherlands) (Austria)	Arthur Diemer-Kool / Hendrik Timmer; Hermann von Artens / Franz-Wilhelm Matejka	6; 2	6; 3	6; 0
4	(Netherlands) (Austria)	Hendrik Timmer; Hermann von Artens						not played
5	(Netherlands) (Austria)	Arthur Diemer-Kool; Franz-Wilhelm Matejka						not played

== Semifinals ==
=== Great Britain vs. Italy ===
Great Britain
1
Felixstowe Lawn Tennis Club, Felixstowe, England
20–22 June 1928
Grass

Italy
4

			1	2	3	4	5
1	(United Kingdom) (Italy)	Edward Higgs; Uberto De Morpurgo	5; 7	4; 6	5; 7
2	(United Kingdom) (Italy)	Colin Gregory; Giorgio de Stefani	6; 3	3; 6	3; 6	2; 6
3	(United Kingdom) (Italy)	Gordon Crole-Rees / Cyril Eames; Placido Gaslini / Uberto De Morpurgo	4; 6	6; 3	6; 4	7; 9	5; 7
4	(United Kingdom) (Italy)	Colin Gregory; Uberto De Morpurgo	0; 6	1; 6	2; 6
5	(United Kingdom) (Italy)	Edward Higgs; Giorgio de Stefani	6; 1	3; 6	6; 3	5; 7	6; 2

=== Czechoslovakia vs. Netherlands ===
Czechoslovakia
3
Prague, Czechoslovakia
22–24 June 1928

Netherlands
2

			1	2	3	4	5
1	(Czechoslovakia) (Netherlands)	Pavel Macenauer; Hendrik Timmer	6; 2	0; 6	6; 0	6; 4
2	(Czechoslovakia) (Netherlands)	Jan Koželuh; Christiaan van Lennep	6; 2	6; 0	6; 2
3	(Czechoslovakia) (Netherlands)	Jan Koželuh / Roderich Menzel; Christiaan van Lennep / Hendrik Timmer	3; 6	6; 3	2; 6	4; 6
4	(Czechoslovakia) (Netherlands)	Jan Koželuh; Hendrik Timmer	3; 6	6; 1	1; 6	4; 6
5	(Czechoslovakia) (Netherlands)	Pavel Macenauer; Christiaan van Lennep	6; 2	6; 2	6; 2

== Final ==
=== Italy vs. Czechoslovakia ===
Italy
3
Milan, Italy
13–15 July 1928
Clay

Czechoslovakia
2

			1	2	3	4	5
1	(Italy) (Czechoslovakia)	Uberto De Morpurgo; Pavel Macenauer	6; 3	6; 3	6; 4
2	(Italy) (Czechoslovakia)	Placido Gaslini; Jan Koželuh	1; 6	7; 9	6; 3	4; 6
3	(Italy) (Czechoslovakia)	Placido Gaslini / Uberto De Morpurgo; Jan Koželuh / Pavel Macenauer	6; 8	6; 4	4; 6	4; 6
4	(Italy) (Czechoslovakia)	Uberto De Morpurgo; Jan Koželuh	6; 1	6; 2	6; 0
5	(Italy) (Czechoslovakia)	Placido Gaslini; Pavel Macenauer	0; 6	6; 4	6; 4	6; 3
