= 1926 International Lawn Tennis Challenge America Zone =

The America Zone was one of the two regional zones of the 1926 International Lawn Tennis Challenge.

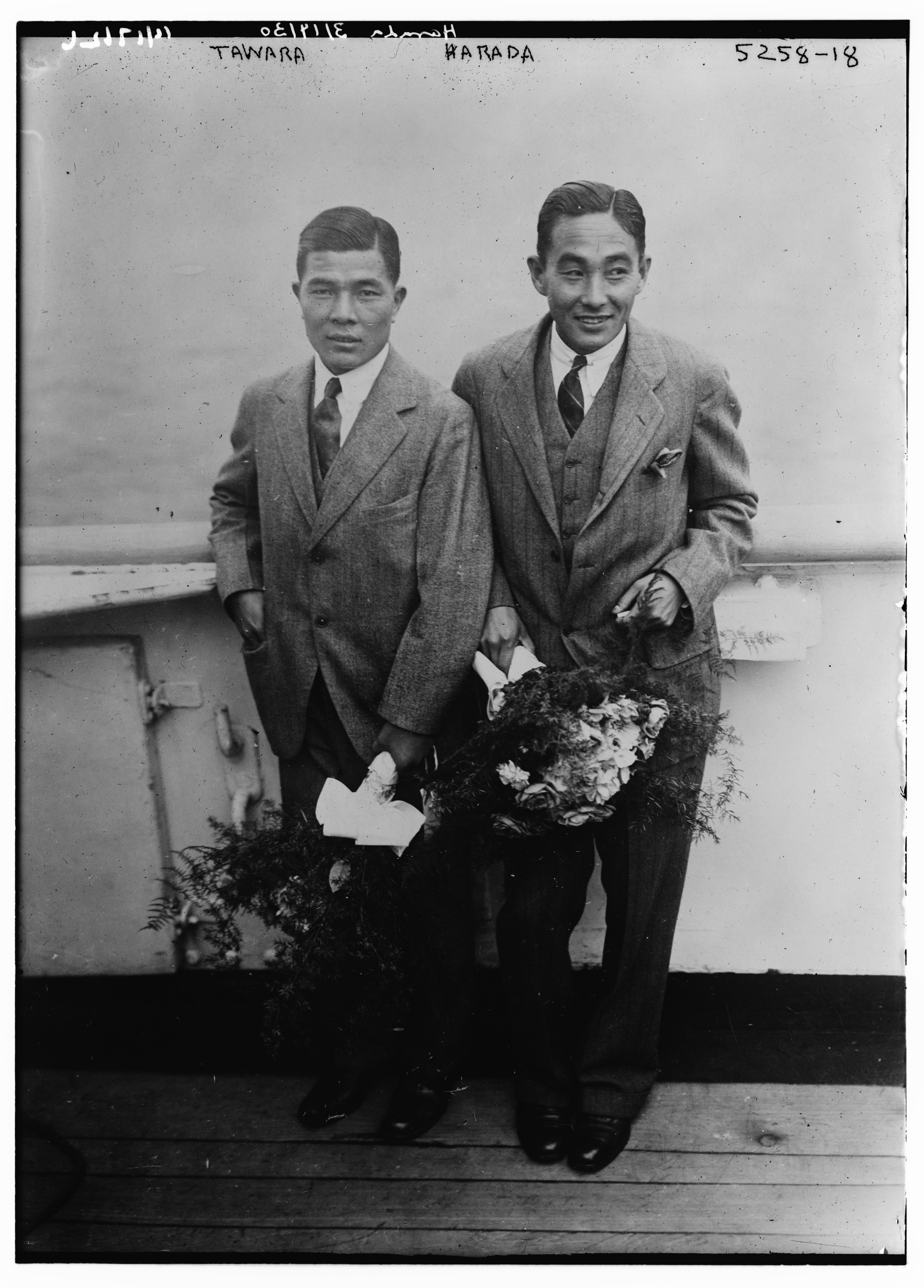
Japanese players Tawara and Harada c. 1920

5 teams entered the America Zone, with the winner going on to compete in the Inter-Zonal Final against the winner of the Europe Zone. Japan defeated Cuba in the final, and went on to face France in the Inter-Zonal Final.

== Draw ==
Quarterfinals; 11–13 June

Semifinals; 25–27 June; 16–18 July

Final; 19–21 August

== Quarterfinals ==
=== Mexico vs. Japan ===
Mexico
1
Club Deportivo Chapultepec, Mexico City, Mexico
11–13 June 1926
clay

Japan
4

			1	2	3	4	5
1	(Mexico) (Japan)	Alfonso Unda; Takeichi Harada	2; 6	4; 6	4; 6
2	(Mexico) (Japan)	Manuel Llano; Teizo Toba	1; 6	7; 5	3; 6	4; 6
3	(Mexico) (Japan)	Claude Butlin / Manuel Llano; Takeichi Harada / Tsumio Tawara	0; 6	7; 9	4; 6
4	(Mexico) (Japan)	Claude Butlin; Teizo Toba	6; 2	6; 3	6; 1
5	(Mexico) (Japan)	Mariano Lozano Alatorre; Tsumio Tawara	1; 6	3; 6	4; 6

== Semifinals ==
=== Japan vs. Philippines ===
Japan
5
San Francisco, CA, United States
25–27 June 1926
Grass

Philippines
0

			1	2	3	4	5
1	(Japan) (Philippines)	Tsumio Tawara; Guillermo Aragon	8; 6	6; 1	8; 6
2	(Japan) (Philippines)	Takeichi Harada; Francisco Aragon	6; 0	6; 4	6; 3
3	(Japan) (Philippines)	Takeichi Harada / Tsumio Tawara; Francisco Aragon / Guillermo Aragon	6; 3	1; 6	5; 7	6; 2	6; 2
4	(Japan) (Philippines)	Takeichi Harada; Guillermo Aragon	6; 2	6; 3	7; 5
5	(Japan) (Philippines)	Tsumio Tawara; Francisco Aragon	6; 2	8; 6	4; 6	1; 6	7; 5

=== Cuba vs. Canada ===
Cuba
3
Havana, Cuba
16–18 July 1926
Clay

Canada
2

			1	2	3	4	5
1	(Cuba) (Canada)	Rogelio Paris; Jack Wright	2; 6	6; 4	2; 6	6; 3	6; 4
2	(Cuba) (Canada)	Vicente Banet; Willard Crocker	4; 6	4; 6	1; 6
3	(Cuba) (Canada)	Raúl Chacón / Rogelio Paris; Willard Crocker / Jack Wright	8; 6	3; 6	6; 8	8; 6	6; 2
4	(Cuba) (Canada)	Vicente Banet; Jack Wright	4; 6	5; 7	2; 6
5	(Cuba) (Canada)	Rogelio Paris; Willard Crocker	6; 4	6; 2	6; 4

== Final ==
=== Japan vs. Cuba ===
Japan
0
Mount Royal Tennis Club, Montreal, Canada
19–21 August 1926
Grass

Cuba
5

			1	2	3	4	5
1	(Japan) (Cuba)	Takeichi Harada; Rogelio Paris	7; 5	6; 0	6; 3
2	(Japan) (Cuba)	Tsumio Tawara; Vicente Banet	9; 7	6; 1	6; 2
3	(Japan) (Cuba)	Takeichi Harada / Tsumio Tawara; Raúl Chacón / Rogelio Paris	6; 4	6; 3	6; 2
4	(Japan) (Cuba)	Tsumio Tawara; Rogelio Paris	6; 2	6; 0	6; 2
5	(Japan) (Cuba)	Teizo Toba; Vicente Banet	6; 2	6; 2	6; 2
