= Jenny Sandison =

Indian tennis player

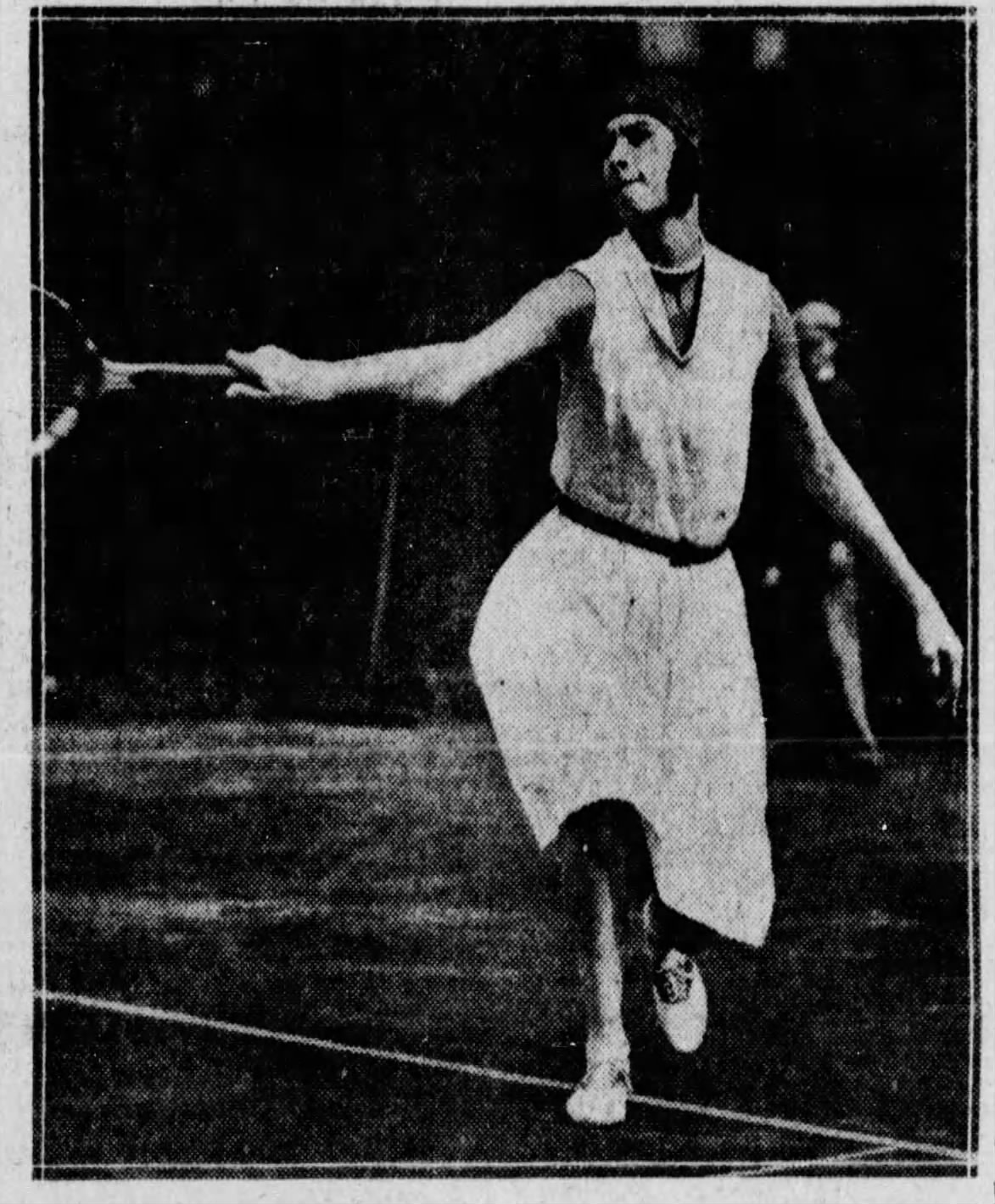
- Country (sports): India
- Born: 1910 Kharagpur, Bengal (now West Bengal, India
- Turned pro: 1927 (amateur)
- Retired: 1938

Singles
- Career record: 140–23 (85.9%)
- Career titles: 20+

Grand Slam singles results
- Wimbledon: 1R (1929, 1930)

Jenny Sandison (born 1910) was an Anglo-Indian tennis player. She was born at Kharagpur, Bengal (now West Bengal, India).

== Career ==
She played her first tournament at the age of 15 at the Calcutta Championships which she won. In January 1927 at the Bengal Championships where she reached the final before losing to Mrs. E.S. Graham. She was the first to hold the top position in women single tennis for a straight six years between 1930 and 1935. She once beat Betty Nuthall at Surbiton in 1930 at the Surrey Championships tournament. Sandison was the first player of Indian origin to play at Wimbledon in 1929 but lost in the first round. In the years 1929 and 1930 she got twice the opportunity to compete at Wimbledon.

She supported herself as a typist while being in England from 1929 to 1930. On 4 October 1930 Jenny departed by sea voyage to Calcutta boarding the Mulbera ship. The rest of her career she never travelled outside the Indian subcontinent.

Sandison, in her entire career won more than 20 singles titles ranging from the 1927 All India Championships at Allahabad to 1938 at Calcutta. Sandison also holds the distinction of winning the All India Championships a record seven times. She also won the Bengal Championships held at the South Club, Calcutta six times (1928–1931, 1934, 1937). She won the Calcutta Championships later renamed the East India Championships twelve times between 1925 and 1938. In 1930 she won the Kent Championships) was her most noteworthy title.

== Family ==
She was an Anglo Indian and came from a mixed family. Her father worked in the railways. She married Terence Boland.
