= 1975 Indian Open =

- Date: 17–23 November
- Edition: 3rd
- Category: Grand Prix (Grade A)
- Draw: 32S / 16D
- Prize money: $50,000
- Surface: Clay / outdoor
- Location: Calcutta, India

Champions

Singles
- (India) Vijay Amritraj

Doubles
- (Spain) Juan Gisbert / (Spain) Manuel Orantes
← 1974 ·	Indian Open	· 1976 →

The 1975 Indian Open was a men's tennis tournament played on outdoor clay courts in Calcutta in India. It was the third edition of the tournament and was held from 17 November through 23 November 1975. The tournament was part of the Grand Prix tennis circuit and categorized in Group A. Second-seeded Vijay Amritraj won the singles title, his second at the event after 1973.

== Finals ==
=== Singles ===
(India) Vijay Amritraj defeated (Spain) Manuel Orantes 7–5, 6–3

- It was Amritraj's 2nd singles title of the year and the 6th of his career.

=== Doubles ===
(Spain) Juan Gisbert / (Spain) Manuel Orantes defeated (India) Anand Amritraj / (India) Vijay Amritraj 1–6, 6–4, 6–3
