= 1928 International Lawn Tennis Challenge America Zone =

The America Zone was one of the two regional zones of the 1928 International Lawn Tennis Challenge.

6 teams entered the America Zone, with the winner going on to compete in the Inter-Zonal Final against the winner of the Europe Zone. The United States defeated Japan in the final, and went on to face Italy in the Inter-Zonal Final.

== Draw ==
Quarterfinals; 9 April–2 May
Taiwan
bye
Mexico City, Mexico (clay)
United States	5
Mexico	0
Havana, Cuba
Japan	3
Cuba	0
bye
Canada

Semifinals; 25–28 May
Kansas City, MO, United States (clay)
Taiwan	0
United States	5
Montreal, Canada (grass)
Japan	3
Canada	1

Final; 1–3 June
Chicago, IL, United States (clay)
United States	5
Japan	0

== Quarterfinals ==
=== Mexico vs. United States ===
Mexico
0
Club Deportivo Chapultepec, Mexico City, Mexico
9–11 April 1928
Clay

United States
5

			1	2	3	4	5
1	(Mexico) (United States)	Ricardo Tapia; John Hennessey	2; 6	7; 9	1; 6
2	(Mexico) (United States)	Robert Kinsey; Bill Tilden	1; 6	2; 6	4; 6
3	(Mexico) (United States)	Robert Kinsey / Alfonso Unda; Arnold Jones / Bill Tilden	2; 6	6; 4	3; 6	3; 6
4	(Mexico) (United States)	Robert Kinsey; John Hennessey	2; 6	0; 6	3; 6
5	(Mexico) (United States)	Alfonso Unda; Wilmer Allison	6; 4	3; 6	6; 8	5; 7

=== Cuba vs. Japan ===
Cuba
0
Havana, Cuba
30 April–2 May 1928

Japan
3

			1	2	3	4	5
1	(Cuba) (Japan)	Vicente Banet; Teizo Toba	1; 6	2; 6	1; 6
2	(Cuba) (Japan)	Rogelio Paris; Yoshiro Ota	1; 6	1; 6	3; 6
3	(Cuba) (Japan)	Vicente Banet / Rogelio Paris; Tamio Abe / Teizo Toba	3; 6	3; 6	6; 4	7; 9
4	(Cuba) (Japan)	Vicente Banet; Yoshiro Ota						not played
5	(Cuba) (Japan)	Rogelio Paris; Teizo Toba						not played

== Semifinals ==
=== United States vs. China ===
United States
5
Rockhill Tennis Club, Kansas City, MO, United States
25–27 May 1928
Clay

Taiwan
0

			1	2	3	4	5
1	(United States) (Taiwan)	John Hennessey; Lum Pao-Hua	6; 3	6; 4	6; 0
2	(United States) (Taiwan)	George Lott; Paul Kong	6; 0	6; 0	6; 0
3	(United States) (Taiwan)	Wilbur Coen / Bill Tilden; Paul Kong / Lum Pao-Hua	6; 2	6; 1	6; 3
4	(United States) (Taiwan)	John Hennessey; Paul Kong	6; 1	6; 0	6; 1
5	(United States) (Taiwan)	George Lott; Lum Pao-Hua	6; 3	6; 2	6; 0

=== Canada vs. Japan ===
Canada
1
Mount Royal Tennis Club, Montreal, Canada
25–28 May 1928
Grass

Japan
3

			1	2	3	4	5
1	(Canada) (Japan)	Willard Crocker; Teizo Toba	6; 0	6; 2	4; 6	6; 3
2	(Canada) (Japan)	Jack Wright; Yoshiro Ota	6; 4	4; 6	6; 1	4; 6	1; 6
3	(Canada) (Japan)	Arthur Ham / Jack Wright; Tamio Abe / Teizo Toba	7; 5	6; 2	3; 6	4; 6	8; 10
4	(Canada) (Japan)	Jack Wright; Teizo Toba	9; 7	6; 3	3; 6	0; 6	4; 6
5	(Canada) (Japan)	Willard Crocker; Yoshiro Ota	6; 2	6; 0	3; 6	9; 11		not completed

== Final ==
=== United States vs. Japan ===
United States
5
Town & Tennis Club, Chicago, IL, United States
1–3 June 1928
Clay

Japan
0

			1	2	3	4	5
1	(United States) (Japan)	Bill Tilden; Tamio Abe	6; 2	6; 3	6; 0
2	(United States) (Japan)	John Hennessey; Yoshiro Ota	8; 6	6; 3	6; 3
3	(United States) (Japan)	George Lott / Bill Tilden; Tamio Abe / Teizo Toba	6; 1	10; 8	6; 2
4	(United States) (Japan)	Wilbur Coen; Tamio Abe	7; 9	6; 2	6; 4	7; 5
5	(United States) (Japan)	Bill Tilden; Yoshiro Ota	6; 8	6; 3	6; 1	6; 0
