= 1926 International Lawn Tennis Challenge Europe Zone =

International tennis competition

The Europe Zone was one of the two regional zones of the 1926 International Lawn Tennis Challenge.

19 teams entered the Europe Zone, with the winner going on to compete in the Inter-Zonal Final against the winner of the America Zone. France defeated Great Britain in the final, and went on to face Japan in the Inter-Zonal Final.

== Draw ==
First Round; 27 April-9 May
Rome, Italy (clay)
Italy	5
Romania	0
Noordwijk, Netherlands (clay)
Netherlands	3
Belgium	2
Sutton Coldfield, England (clay)
South Africa	4
Portugal	1

Second Round; 8–22 May
Dublin, Ireland (grass)
Ireland	2
Spain	3
Barcelona, Spain (clay)
Argentina	3
Hungary	2
Harrogate, England (clay)
Great Britain	5
Poland	0
Rome, Italy (clay)
Italy	3
Netherlands	2
South Africa	w/o
Austria
Malmö, Sweden
Sweden	3
Switzerland	2
Prague, Czechoslovakia
Czechoslovakia	4
India	1
Copenhagen, Denmark (clay)
Denmark	0
France	5

Quarterfinals; 24 May-2 June
Barcelona, Spain (clay)
Spain	3
Argentina	1
Rome, Italy (clay)
Great Britain	3
Italy	2
Kensington, England (clay)
South Africa	1
Sweden	4
Prague, Czechoslovakia (clay)
Czechoslovakia	0
France	3

Semifinals; 9–16 July
Barcelona, Spain (clay)
Spain	1
Great Britain	4
Stockholm, Sweden (clay)
Sweden	0
France	5

Final; 24–26 July
Cabourg, France (clay)
Great Britain	0
France	5

== First round ==
=== Romania vs. Italy ===
Romania
0
Bucharest, Romania
27–29 April 1926
Clay

Italy
5

			1	2	3	4	5
1	(Romania) (Italy)	Nicolae Mișu; Uberto De Morpurgo	2; 6	1; 6	3; 6
2	(Romania) (Italy)	Alfred San Galli; Clemente Serventi	2; 6	2; 6	1; 6
3	(Romania) (Italy)	Nicolae Mișu / Alfred San Galli; Uberto De Morpurgo / Clemente Serventi	3; 6	3; 6	5; 7
4	(Romania) (Italy)	Alfred San Galli; Uberto De Morpurgo	1; 6	1; 6	2; 6
5	(Romania) (Italy)	Nicolae Mișu; Clemente Serventi	6; 2	3; 6	1; 6	1; 0		retired

=== Netherlands vs. Belgium ===
Netherlands
3
Noordwijk, Netherlands
7–9 May 1926
Clay

Belgium
2

			1	2	3	4	5
1	(Netherlands) (Belgium)	Christiaan van Lennep; Jean Washer	6; 4	3; 6	6; 8	6; 3	2; 6
2	(Netherlands) (Belgium)	Hendrik Timmer; André Laloux	6; 1	6; 0	6; 1
3	(Netherlands) (Belgium)	Arthur Diemer-Kool / Christiaan van Lennep; Georges François / Jean Washer	0; 6	8; 10	6; 3	6; 2	7; 5
4	(Netherlands) (Belgium)	Christiaan van Lennep; André Laloux	6; 0	6; 0	6; 2
5	(Netherlands) (Belgium)	Hendrik Timmer; Jean Washer	1; 6	3; 6	5; 7

=== South Africa vs. Portugal ===
South Africa
4
Sutton Hard Courts Lawn Tennis Club, Sutton Coldfield, England
30 April–2 May 1926
Clay

Portugal
1

			1	2	3	4	5
1	(South Africa) (Portugal)	Patrick Spence; Antonio Casanovas	6; 1	6; 1	6; 4
2	(South Africa) (Portugal)	Julien Lezard; José de Verda	3; 6	2; 6	1; 6
3	(South Africa) (Portugal)	Julien Lezard / Patrick Spence; José de Verda / Fernando Vasconcelos	6; 1	6; 4	6; 2
4	(South Africa) (Portugal)	Patrick Spence; José de Verda	6; 1	2; 6	6; 2	6; 2
5	(South Africa) (Portugal)	Julien Lezard; Antonio Casanovas	6; 4	6; 1	6; 2

== Second round ==
=== Ireland vs. Spain ===
Ireland
2
Fitzwilliam Lawn Tennis Club, Dublin, Ireland
20–22 May 1926
Grass

Spain
3

			1	2	3	4	5
1	(Republic of Ireland) (Spain)	Edward McGuire; Francisco Sindreu	3; 6	2; 6	3; 6
2	(Republic of Ireland) (Spain)	Louis Meldon; Antonio Juanico	6; 1	6; 4	6; 4
3	(Republic of Ireland) (Spain)	Ben Haughton / Louis Meldon; Antonio Juanico / Francisco Sindreu	6; 4	8; 6	6; 3
4	(Republic of Ireland) (Spain)	Louis Meldon; Francisco Sindreu	1; 6	1; 6	2; 6
5	(Republic of Ireland) (Spain)	Edward McGuire; Antonio Juanico	4; 6	5; 7	6; 2	4; 6

=== Argentina vs. Hungary ===
Argentina
2
Barcelona, Spain
16–18 May 1926
Clay

Hungary
3

			1	2	3	4	5
1	(Argentina) (Hungary)	Guillermo Robson; Béla von Kehrling	3; 6	6; 3	3; 6	2; 6
2	(Argentina) (Hungary)	Enrique Obarrio; Imre Takáts	6; 0	6; 4	6; 0
3	(Argentina) (Hungary)	Enrique Obarrio / Guillermo Robson; Béla von Kehrling / Kálmán Kirchmäyer	6; 2	6; 4	6; 3
4	(Argentina) (Hungary)	Guillermo Robson; Imre Takáts	6; 4	6; 1	6; 1
5	(Argentina) (Hungary)	Enrique Obarrio; Béla von Kehrling	3; 6	5; 7	4; 6

=== Great Britain vs. Poland ===
Great Britain
5
Royal Hall Grounds, Harrogate, England
8–11 May 1926
Clay

Poland
0

			1	2	3	4	5
1	(United Kingdom) (Poland)	Noel Turnbull; Edward Kleinadel	6; 1	7; 5	6; 0
2	(United Kingdom) (Poland)	Patrick Wheatley; Stanisław Czetwertyński	6; 4	6; 3	6; 4
3	(United Kingdom) (Poland)	Gordon Crole-Rees / Charles Kingsley; Edward Kleinadel / Karol Steinert	7; 5	6; 4	6; 3
4	(United Kingdom) (Poland)	Noel Turnbull; Stanisław Czetwertyński	6; 0	6; 2	7; 5
5	(United Kingdom) (Poland)	Patrick Wheatley; Edward Kleinadel	6; 2	6; 4	6; 1

=== Italy vs. Netherlands ===
Italy
3
Rome, Italy
16–18 May 1926
Clay

Netherlands
2

			1	2	3	4	5
1	(Italy) (Netherlands)	Clemente Serventi; Hendrik Timmer	4; 6	2; 6	4; 6
2	(Italy) (Netherlands)	Uberto De Morpurgo; Christiaan van Lennep	6; 3	6; 3	6; 4
3	(Italy) (Netherlands)	Uberto De Morpurgo / Clemente Serventi; Cornelis Bryan / Hendrik Timmer	6; 3	6; 4	6; 3
4	(Italy) (Netherlands)	Uberto De Morpurgo; Hendrik Timmer	6; 4	6; 2	6; 3
5	(Italy) (Netherlands)	Clemente Serventi; Christiaan van Lennep	3; 6	6; 3	1; 6	4; 6

=== Sweden vs. Switzerland ===
Sweden
3
Malmö Athletic Outdoor Courts, Malmö, Sweden
11–13 May 1926
Clay

Switzerland
2

			1	2	3	4	5
1	(Sweden) (Switzerland)	Marcus Wallenberg; Charles Aeschlimann	6; 4	4; 6	6; 2	6; 1
2	(Sweden) (Switzerland)	Sune Malmström; Jean Wuarin	6; 4	6; 1	6; 2
3	(Sweden) (Switzerland)	Sune Malmström / Marcus Wallenberg; Charles Aeschlimann / Jean Wuarin	6; 4	2; 6	4; 6	6; 4	4; 6
4	(Sweden) (Switzerland)	Marcus Wallenberg; Jean Wuarin	4; 6	6; 1	6; 1	6; 1
5	(Sweden) (Switzerland)	Sune Malmström; Charles Aeschlimann	6; 1	2; 6	2; 6	6; 4	3; 6

=== Czechoslovakia vs. India ===
Czechoslovakia
4
Prague, Czechoslovakia
14–16 May 1926

India
1

			1	2	3	4	5
1	(Czechoslovakia) (India)	Pavel Macenauer; Athar-Ali Fyzee	4; 6	6; 4	7; 9	0; 6
2	(Czechoslovakia) (India)	Jan Koželuh; Hassan Ali Fyzee	6; 1	6; 3	6; 1
3	(Czechoslovakia) (India)	Jan Koželuh / Ladislav Žemla; Sandford Bobb / Hassan Ali Fyzee	6; 2	6; 3	6; 1
4	(Czechoslovakia) (India)	Pavel Macenauer; Hassan Ali Fyzee	6; 2	7; 5	5; 7	6; 0
5	(Czechoslovakia) (India)	Jan Koželuh; Athar-Ali Fyzee	6; 3	6; 2	7; 5

=== Denmark vs. France ===
Denmark
0
Copenhagen, Denmark
14–16 May 1926
Clay

France
5

			1	2	3	4	5
1	(Denmark) (France)	Axel Petersen; René Lacoste	4; 6	5; 7	1; 6
2	(Denmark) (France)	Einer Ulrich; Henri Cochet	2; 6	3; 6	6; 2	0; 6
3	(Denmark) (France)	Povl Henriksen / Einer Ulrich; Jacques Brugnon / Henri Cochet	6; 4	3; 6	6; 4	5; 7	0; 6
4	(Denmark) (France)	Einer Ulrich; Jacques Brugnon	1; 6	2; 6	8; 6	6; 3	1; 6
5	(Denmark) (France)	Axel Petersen; Henri Cochet	6; 3	2; 6	6; 3	5; 7	4; 6

== Quarterfinals ==
=== Spain vs. Argentina ===
Spain
3
Real Club de Tenis Barcelona, Barcelona, Spain
29–31 May 1926
Clay

Argentina
1

			1	2	3	4	5
1	(Spain) (Argentina)	Eduardo Flaquer; Enrique Obarrio	4; 6	5; 7	6; 0	6; 0	6; 2
2	(Spain) (Argentina)	Francisco Sindreu; Guillermo Robson	6; 4	5; 7	7; 5	4; 6	2; 6
3	(Spain) (Argentina)	Eduardo Flaquer / Raimundo Morales Marqués; Enrique Obarrio / Guillermo Robson	6; 4	9; 7	6; 3
4	(Spain) (Argentina)	Francisco Sindreu; Enrique Obarrio	5; 7	6; 1	7; 5	4; 6	6; 3
5	(Spain) (Argentina)	Eduardo Flaquer; Guillermo Robson	4; 6	6; 4	4; 6	6; 3		not completed

=== Italy vs. Great Britain ===
Italy
2
Rome, Italy
27–29 May 1926
Clay

Great Britain
3

			1	2	3	4	5
1	(Italy) (United Kingdom)	Clemente Serventi; Patrick Wheatley	7; 5	4; 6	1; 6	3; 6
2	(Italy) (United Kingdom)	Uberto De Morpurgo; Noel Turnbull	4; 6	6; 2	4; 6	6; 4	6; 2
3	(Italy) (United Kingdom)	Uberto De Morpurgo / Clemente Serventi; Gordon Crole-Rees / Charles Kingsley	6; 3	8; 6	4; 6	3; 6	3; 6
4	(Italy) (United Kingdom)	Uberto De Morpurgo; Patrick Wheatley	6; 2	6; 3	3; 2			retired
5	(Italy) (United Kingdom)	Clemente Serventi; Noel Turnbull	6; 3	1; 6	1; 6	2; 6

=== Sweden vs. South Africa ===
Sweden
4
Melbury Lawn Tennis Club, Kensington, England
31 May–2 June 1926
Clay

South Africa
1

			1	2	3	4	5
1	(Sweden) (South Africa)	Ingvar Garell; Patrick Spence	4; 6	4; 6	6; 8
2	(Sweden) (South Africa)	Sune Malmström; Gerald Sherwell	8; 6	6; 3	6; 4
3	(Sweden) (South Africa)	Ingvar Garell / Sune Malmström; Julien Lezard / Patrick Spence	6; 2	8; 6	8; 6
4	(Sweden) (South Africa)	Sune Malmström; Patrick Spence	8; 6	6; 3	6; 1
5	(Sweden) (South Africa)	Ingvar Garell; Gerald Sherwell	6; 4	6; 4	6; 1

=== Czechoslovakia vs. France ===
Czechoslovakia
0
Prague, Czechoslovakia
24–25 May 1926
Clay

France
3

			1	2	3	4	5
1	(Czechoslovakia) (France)	Jan Koželuh; René Lacoste	5; 7	7; 5	3; 6	8; 6	3; 6
2	(Czechoslovakia) (France)	Pavel Macenauer; Henri Cochet	3; 6	4; 6	3; 6
3	(Czechoslovakia) (France)	Jan Koželuh / Ladislav Žemla; Jacques Brugnon / René Lacoste	2; 6	6; 3	8; 6	2; 6	5; 7
4	(Czechoslovakia) (France)	Jan Koželuh; Henri Cochet						not played
5	(Czechoslovakia) (France)	Pavel Macenauer; René Lacoste						not played

== Semifinals ==
=== Spain vs. Great Britain ===
Spain
1
Societat Sportiva Pompeya, Barcelona, Spain
9–11 July 1926
Clay

Great Britain
4

			1	2	3	4	5
1	(Spain) (United Kingdom)	Eduardo Flaquer; Colin Gregory	3; 6	0; 6	2; 6
2	(Spain) (United Kingdom)	Francisco Sindreu; Charles Kingsley	5; 7	6; 2	5; 7	6; 3	3; 6
3	(Spain) (United Kingdom)	Eduardo Flaquer / Raimundo Morales Marqués; Gordon Crole-Rees / Charles Kingsley	9; 11	4; 6	2; 6
4	(Spain) (United Kingdom)	Francisco Sindreu; Colin Gregory	6; 2	4; 6	2; 6	3; 6
5	(Spain) (United Kingdom)	Raimundo Morales Marqués; Keats Lester	6; 3	6; 2	6; 2

=== Sweden vs. France ===
Sweden
0
East Malm Athletic/Soccer Fields, Stockholm, Sweden
14–16 July 1926
Clay

France
5

			1	2	3	4	5
1	(Sweden) (France)	Marcus Wallenberg; Henri Cochet	3; 6	3; 6	3; 6
2	(Sweden) (France)	Sune Malmström; Jean Borotra	6; 3	6; 2	6; 8	3; 6	3; 6
3	(Sweden) (France)	Sune Malmström / Marcus Wallenberg; Jean Borotra / Jacques Brugnon	4; 6	1; 6	1; 6
4	(Sweden) (France)	Sune Malmström; Henri Cochet	4; 6	7; 5	4; 6	6; 4	3; 6
5	(Sweden) (France)	Marcus Wallenberg; Jean Borotra	8; 6	4; 6	2; 6	1; 6

== Final ==
=== France vs. Great Britain ===
France
5
Garden Tennis Club, Cabourg, France
24–26 July 1926
Clay

Great Britain
0

			1	2	3	4	5
1	(France) (United Kingdom)	Henri Cochet; Colin Gregory	7; 5	4; 6	7; 9	7; 5	6; 0
2	(France) (United Kingdom)	René Lacoste; Noel Turnbull	6; 4	6; 4	6; 4
3	(France) (United Kingdom)	Jean Borotra / Jacques Brugnon; Gordon Crole-Rees / Charles Kingsley	6; 2	6; 0	6; 3
4	(France) (United Kingdom)	Pierre Henri Landry; Colin Gregory	6; 3	6; 2	6; 1
5	(France) (United Kingdom)	Jacques Brugnon; Noel Turnbull	4; 6	1; 6	6; 2	6; 4	6; 0
