= Indian Open (tennis) =

Defunct tennis tournament
- Tour: Grand Prix circuit
- Founded: 1923
- Abolished: 1979
- Location: Various; India
- Surface: Clay, Grass, Hard

The Indian Open was a men's tennis tournament founded as the India International Championships in 1923. It was played from 1923 until 1979 and the men's event was part of the Grand Prix tennis circuit, 1973 to 1979. From 1947 to 1972 it was known as the Indian National Championships (though open to international competitors). It was held in various cities across India and was played outdoor on multiple surfaces.

== History ==
Tennis was introduced to India in 1880s by British Army and Civilian Officers. In 1923 the India International Championships were established and played at the Calcutta South Club, Calcutta, West Bengal, India.

In 1973, the Indian championships with international competitors diverged from the national championships. By the late 1970s the national championships was a minor event for Indian born players. The international event was renamed as the Indian Open in 1973.

== Locations and venues ==
The Calcutta South Club was founded in 1920, and also organised the Calcutta Lawn Tennis Championships.That tournament later became known as the East India Lawn Tennis Championships. Its current facilities consist of the six original grass courts, In 1985 the Club built six new clay courts, and in 2004 it added five asphalt-based rubberized hard courts.

After the war until the start of the open era, the India International Championships were predominantly staged in Calcutta, under the tournament name the Indian National Championships. The event was often held over Christmas and new year and on a few occasions two events were held in a single year in January and December (sometimes winners are described as winning in a year in which an event started in late December, other times in the year the event finished in early January). In a few years, the event was also held in other cities such as New Delhi and Allahabad.

== Finals ==
=== Men's singles ===
Year	Location	Winner	Runner-up	Score
India International Championships
1923	Calcutta	(Japan) Sunao Okamoto		
1924	Calcutta	(Japan) Sunao Okamoto (2)		
1925	Calcutta	(British Raj) Syed Anwar Yusoof		
1926	Calcutta	(United Kingdom) J. Robson		
1927	Calcutta	(Japan) Sunao Okamoto (3)	(British Raj) Pershotam Lal Mehta	5–7, 6–4, 6–4
1928	Calcutta	(British Raj) Atri-Madan Mohan	(British Raj) Pershotam Lal Mehta	3–6, 6–3, 6–1, 8–6
1929	Calcutta	(British Raj) Edward Vivian Bobb	(British Raj) Mohammed Sleem	3–6, 3–6, 6–3, 6–4, 6–4
1930	Calcutta	(United Kingdom) Bunny Austin	(New Zealand) Eskell 'Buster' Andrews	6–2, 7–5, 6–1
1931	Calcutta	(Japan) Jiro Fujikura	(Japan) Ryuki Miki	3–6, 3–6, 6–1, 7–5, 6–0
1932	Calcutta	(Italy) Giorgio de Stefani	(India) Dip Narain Kapoor	7–5, 6–4, 6–2
1933	Calcutta	(India) Atri-Madan Mohan (2)	(British Raj) Edward Vivian Bobb	10–8, 6–3, 6–3
1934	Calcutta	(Socialist Federal Republic of Yugoslavia) Josip Palada	(Socialist Federal Republic of Yugoslavia) Franjo Punčec	9–7, 6–4, 6–3
All India Championships
1935	Allahabad	(Socialist Federal Republic of Yugoslavia) Josip Palada (2)	(Socialist Federal Republic of Yugoslavia) Franjo Punčec	4–6, 7–5, 6–3, 6–2
1936	Calcutta	(First Czechoslovak Republic) Ladislav Hecht	(First Czechoslovak Republic) Roderich Menzel	2–6, 3–6, 6–4, 6–1, 5–5 ret.
1937	Allahabad	(India) Edward Vivian Bobb (2)	(India) Dip Narain Kapoor	6–4, 7–5, 6–3
1938	Allahabad	(India) Dip Narain Kapoor	(India) Islam Ahmad	8–6, 6–4, 6–4
1939	Bombay	(India) Ghaus Mohammad	(India) Tenkasi K. Ramanathan	6–1, 6–2
1940	Calcutta	(Socialist Federal Republic of Yugoslavia) Franjo Punčec	(India) Yudishtra Singh	11-9. 6–4, 7–5
1941	Baroda	(India) Ghaus Mohammad (2)	(India) Iftikhar Ahmed Khan	6–0, 6–3, 7–5
1942	Lahore	(India) Subba L.R. Sawhney	(India) Prem Lal Pandhi	6–1, 6–1, 6–0
1943	Indore	(India) Ghaus Mohammad (3)	(India) Iftikhar Ahmed Khan	6–2, 7–5, 4–6, 6–3
1944	Allahabad	(United States) Hal Surface	(India) Ghaus Mohammad	6–2, 6–4, 6–0
1945	Madras	(India) Sumant Misra	(India) B.R. Kapinipathy	9–7, 9–7, 5–7, 6–0
1946	Calcutta	(India) Ghaus Mohammad (4)	(India) Dilip Bose	7–5, 3–6, 6–3, 6–3
India National Championships
1947	Calcutta	(India) Sumant Misra (2)	(India) Man-Mohan Bhandari	4–6, 6–3, 6–2, 6–0
1948	Calcutta	(Sweden) Lennart Bergelin	(India) Sumant Misra	8–6, 6–1, 6–4
1949	Calcutta	(India) Dilip Bose	(India) Sumant Misra	3–6, 6–3, 6–3, 8–6
1950	Allahabad	(Philippines) Felicisimo Ampon	(Spain) Pedro Masip	5–7, 8–6, 8–6, 6–1
1951	Calcutta	(Sweden) Sven Davidson	(Czechoslovakia) Jaroslav Drobný	6–3, 6–3 7–5
1952	Calcutta	(Sweden) Sven Davidson (2)	(Pakistan) Khan-Iftikhar Ahmed	6–3, 6–4, 8–6
1953	Calcutta	(India) Sumant Misra (3)	(India) Naresh Kumar	6–8, 2–6, 6–3, 9–7, 6–3
1954	Calcutta	(India) Ramanathan Krishnan	(Australia) Jack Arkinstall	6–2, 6–3, 7–5
1955	Calcutta	(Australia) Jack Arkinstall	(India) Ramanathan Krishnan	3–6, 6–3, 3–6, 6–2, 6–3
1956	New Delhi	(Sweden) Sven Davidson (3)	(Denmark) Kurt Nielsen	6–4, 6–1, 15–17, 6–4
1957	Calcutta	(India) Ramanathan Krishnan (2)	(India) Naresh Kumar	6–4, 6–0, 8–6
1958	Calcutta	(Sweden) Ulf Schmidt	(India) Ramanathan Krishnan	6–2, 6–2, 4–6, 4–6, 6–3
1959	Calcutta	(India) Ramanathan Krishnan (3)	(India) Naresh Kumar	6–2, 6–2, 6–1
1960	New Delhi	(India) Ramanathan Krishnan (4)	(Sweden) Ulf Schmidt	6–3, 6–3 6–1
1961	Calcutta	(India) Ramanathan Krishnan (5)	(Brazil) Carlos Fernandes	6–2, 6–2, 3–6, 7–5
India National and Northern India Championships
1962	New Delhi	(Australia) Roy Emerson	(India) Ramanathan Krishnan	6–4, 6–4, 6–3
1963	New Delhi	(India) Ramanathan Krishnan (6)	(India) Jaidip Mukerjea	6–4, 6–0, 6–3
1964	New Delhi	(India) Ramanathan Krishnan (7)	(United Kingdom) Alan Mills	6–1, 6–3, 6–4
1965	New Delhi	(India) Ramanathan Krishnan (8)	(Australia) Martin Mulligan	w.o.
1966	New Delhi	(India) Jaidip Mukerjea	(India) Premjit Lall	4–6, 6–3, 6–4, 6–0
1967	New Delhi	(India) Premjit Lall	(India) Ramanathan Krishnan	3–6, 7–5, 5–7, 2–1 rtd.
India International Championships
1968	Calcutta	(Romania) Ion Țiriac	(India) Jaidip Mukerjea	6–4, 4–6, 6–2, 5–7, 6–4
↓ Open era ↓
India National Championships
1969	New Delhi	(Romania) Ilie Năstase	(India) Premjit Lall	6–4, 6–2, 4–6, 6–4
1970	Calcutta	(India) Premjit Lall (2)	(Soviet Union) Alex Metreveli	9–7, 6–0, 5–7 6–3
1971	Calcutta	(India) Jaidip Mukerjea (2)	(India) Premjit Lall	7-5, 6-3, 6-3
1972	Calcutta	(India) Gaurav Misra	(India) Ramanathan Krishnan	4–6, 6–4, 8–10, 7–5, 6–2
Indian Open
1973	New Delhi	(India) Vijay Amritraj	(Australia) Mal Anderson	6–4, 5–7, 7–9, 6–3, 11-9
1974	Bombay	(New Zealand) Onny Parun	(Australia) Tony Roche	6–3, 6–3, 7–6
1975	Calcutta	(India) Vijay Amritraj (2)	(Spain) Manuel Orantes	7–5, 6–3
1976	Bangalore	(Australia) Kim Warwick	(India) Sashi Menon	6–1, 6–2
1977	Bombay	(India) Vijay Amritraj (3)	(United States) Terry Moor	7–6, 6–4
1978	Calcutta	(France) Yannick Noah	(France) Pascal Portes	6–3, 6–2
1979	Bombay	(India) Vijay Amritraj (4)	(Germany) Peter Elter	6–1, 7–5

=== Men's doubles ===
Year	Champions	Runners-up	Score
1973	(United States) Jim McManus (Mexico) Raúl Ramírez	(India) Anand Amritraj (India) Vijay Amritraj	6–2, 6–4
1974	(India) Anand Amritraj (India) Vijay Amritraj	(Australia) Dick Crealy (New Zealand) Onny Parun	6–4, 7–6
1975	(Spain) Juan Gisbert (Spain) Manuel Orantes	(India) Anand Amritraj (India) Vijay Amritraj	1–6, 6–4, 6–3
1976	(Australia) Bob Carmichael (Australia) Ray Ruffels	(India) Chiradip Mukerjea (India) Bhanu Nunna	6–2, 7–6
1977	(United States) Mike Cahill (United States) Terry Moor	(Mexico) Marcello Lara (India) Jasjit Singh	6–7, 6–4, 6–4
1978	(India) Sashi Menon (United States) Sherwood Stewart	(France) Gilles Moretton (France) Yannick Noah	7–6, 6–4
1979	(United States) Chris Delaney (United States) James Delaney	(Germany) Thomas Fürst (Germany) Wolfgang Popp	7–6, 6–2

== See also ==
- All India Hard Court Championships
- National Lawn Tennis Championships of India
- Category:National and multi-national tennis tournaments

== Sources ==
- Majumdar, Boria; Mangan, J. A. (2013). Sport in South Asian Society: Past and Present. Routledge. ISBN 9781317998945.
- http://www.tennisarchives.com/All India Championships 1910–1956
