= 1974 Indian Open =

- Date: 11 – 17 November
- Edition: 2nd
- Category: Grand Prix (Grade B)
- Draw: 32S / 16D
- Prize money: $50,000
- Surface: Clay / outdoor
- Location: Bombay, India

Champions

Singles
- (New Zealand) Onny Parun

Doubles
- (India) Anand Amritraj / (India) Vijay Amritraj
| ← 1973 · | Indian Open | · 1975 → |

The 1974 Indian Open was a men's tennis tournament played on outdoor clay courts in Bombay, India. It was the second edition of the event and was held from 11 November through 17 November 1974. The tournament was part of the Grand Prix tennis circuit and categorized in Group B. Third-seeded Onny Parun won the singles title.

== Finals ==
=== Singles ===
(New Zealand) Onny Parun defeated (Australia) Tony Roche 6–3, 6–3, 7–6

=== Doubles ===
(India) Anand Amritraj / (India) Vijay Amritraj defeated (Australia) Dick Crealy / (New Zealand) Onny Parun 6–4, 7–6
