= 1979 Indian Open =

- Date: 19–25 November
- Edition: 7th
- Category: Grand Prix
- Draw: 32S / 16D
- Prize money: $75,000 (Rs 6 lakh)
- Surface: Clay / outdoor
- Location: Bombay, India

Champions

Singles
- (India) Vijay Amritraj

Doubles
- (United States) Chris Delaney / (United States) James Delaney
← 1978 ·	Indian Open

The 1979 Indian Open, also known as the Indian Grand Prix, was a men's tennis tournament played on outdoor clay courts in Bombay, India. It was the seventh and last edition of the tournament and was held from 19 November through 25 November 1979. The tournament was part of the Grand Prix tennis circuit. First-seeded Vijay Amritraj won the singles title, his fourth at the event after 1973, 1975 and 1977. Due to the cancellation of the tournament in Manila, Philippines the Indian Open was held one week earlier compared to the original schedule.

== Finals ==
=== Singles ===
(India) Vijay Amritraj defeated (West Germany) Peter Elter 6–1, 7–5

- It was Amritraj's only singles title of the year and the 12th of his career.

=== Doubles ===
(United States) Chris Delaney / (United States) James Delaney defeated (West Germany) Thomas Furst / (West Germany) Wolfgang Popp 7–6, 6–2
