= Bombay Suburban Open =

Defunct tennis tournament
- Tour: ILTF Asian Circuit
- Founded: 1936
- Abolished: 1945
- Location: Bombay, India
- Surface: Clay / outdoor

The Bombay Suburban Open was a combined clay court tennis tournament founded in 1936. The tournament was organised by and played at the Bandra Gymkhana, Bombay, India until 1940 when it was discontinued due to World War II. It resumed for one edition only in 1945 the last mens singles winner was Henry Ferreira.

== Finals ==
=== Men's singles ===
(Incomplete roll)

Year	Winners	Runners-up	Score
1940	(British Raj) Edward Vivian Bobb	(Dominion of Ceylon) L.R. Pereira	7-5 6-2
1945	(British Raj) Henry Ferreira	(Denmark) Finn Bekkevold	5-7, 6-4, 7-5.
