= Edward Vivian Bobb =

Indian tennis player

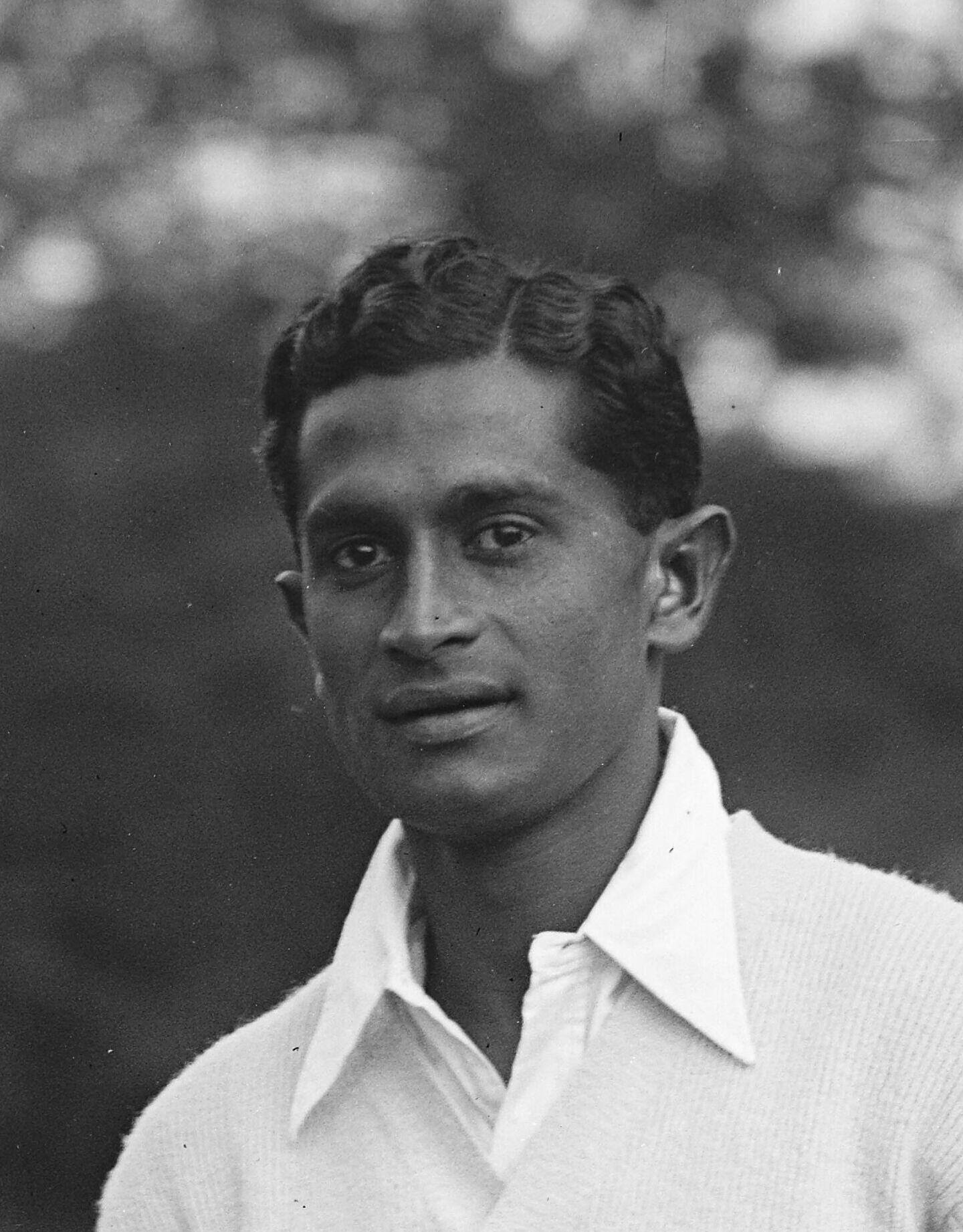
- Bobb in 1928
- Country (sports): India
- Born: 27 July 1902 Agra, India
- Died: 1974 (age 72) Toronto, Canada
- Turned pro: 1921 (amateur tour)
- Retired: 1940
- Plays: Right-handed

Singles
- Career titles: 21

Grand Slam singles results
- Wimbledon: 2R (1928)

Edward Vivian Bobb (27 July 1902 – 1974) also known as E.V. Bobb was an Indian tennis player who competed at the 1928 Wimbledon Championships. He was active from 1921 to 1940 and won 21 career singles titles.

== Tennis career ==
Bobb played his first tournament at the 1921 All India Championships where he reached the final and secured his first singles title. He would go onto win five more national championships from 1926 to 1927, 1930, 1933 and 1937. Bobb was particularly successful during the 1930s in India. In major tournaments he took part one time at the 1928 Wimbledon Championships where he reached the second round before losing to the American player Wilbur Coen in straight sets. That year he also played in Italy where he reached the final of the TC Juventus Torino Championship in Turin on clay, before losing to Mohammed Sleem in straight sets.

His other career singles highlights included winning multiple titles at the Western India Championships three times (1934, 1939–1940), the Bombay Presidency Hard Court Championships four times (1934-1935, 1938, 1940). He won the Indian International Championships in 1929 and was a finalist in 1933. He played his final tournament at the 1940 Western India Championships.

== Singles titles (21) ==
Result	No.	Date	Tournament	Location	Surface	Opponent	Score
Win	1.	1921	All India Championships	Allahabad	Grass	(India) Mohammed Sleem	6–4, 6–3, 6–2
Win	2.	1926	All India Championships	Allahabad	Grass	(India) Sri-Krishna Prasada	6–2, 4–6, 4–6, 6–2, 7–5
Win	3.	1927	Bengal Lawn Tennis Championships	Calcutta	Grass	(India) Raghubir Dayal	9-7 8-6 6-2
Win	4.	1927	All India Championships	Allahabad	Grass	(India) Dip Narain Kapoor	5-7 7-5 8-6 6-3
Win	5.	1929	India International Championships	Calcutta	Grass	(India) Mohammed Sleem	3-6 3-6 6-3 6-4 6-4
Win	6.	1930	All India Championships	Allahabad	Grass	(India) Dip Narain Kapoor	6-4 5-7 6-3 6-2
Win	7.	1931	United Provinces Championships	Mussoorie	?	(England) Eric Burn Andreae	6-4 6-3 5-7 6-3
Win	8.	1933	All India Championships	Allahabad	Grass	(India) Sohan Lal	5-7 3-6 6-3 6-1 10-8
Win	9.	1933	North West India Championships	Karachi	Grass	(India) Mr. Daryanani	6-4 6-1
Win	10.	1933	Bandra Open	Bandra	Clay	(India) Janmeja Charanjiva	6-0 6-3
Win	11.	1933	Parsi Gymkhana Open	Bombay	Clay	(United Kingdom) John Edward Tew	6-3 7-5
Win	12.	1934.	Bombay Hard Court Championships	Bombay	Clay	(India) Janmeja Charanjiva	5-7 7-5 6-0
Win	13.	1934	Western India Championships	Bombay	Clay	(United Kingdom) John Edward Tew	7-5 7-5
Win	14.	1935	Bombay Hard Court Championships	Bombay	Clay	(Dominion of Ceylon) A.C. Pereira	5-7 7-5 6-0
Win	15.	1937	All India Championships	Allahabad	Grass	(India) Dip Narain Kapoor	6-4 7-5 6-3
Win	16.	1938	Parsi Gymkhana Open	Bombay	Clay	(United Kingdom) Bernard Thomas Blake	6-3 2-6 6-4
Win	17.	1938	Bombay Hard Court Championships	Bombay	Clay	(United Kingdom) Bernard Thomas Blake	9-7 2-6 6-3
Win	18.	1939	Western India Championships	Bombay	Clay	(India) Syed Abdul Azim	3-6 6-1 6-3
Win	19.	1940	Bombay Suburban Open	Bombay	Clay	(Dominion of Ceylon) L.R. Pereira	7-5 6-2
Win	20.	1940	Bombay Hard Court Championships	Bombay	Clay	(India) Rasi Kumarasinhji	6-4 6-3
Win	21.	1940	Western India Championships	Bombay	Clay	(India) Syed Abdul Azim	2-6 6-1 6-2

== Military career ==
During World War II, Bobb joined the Royal Indian Navy Volunteer Reserve and served as a Paymaster Lieutenant in May 1939. He rose to the rank of Paymaster Lieutenant-Commander in June 1947.

== Family ==
Bobb married Lorna Lois Williamson (b. 27 February 1909) in 1931.
