= Bombay Presidency Hard Court Championships =

Defunct tennis tournament
- Founded: 1924; 101 years ago
- Abolished: 1949; 76 years ago
- Location: Bombay, India
- Venue: Hindu Gymkhana
- Surface: Clay

The Bombay Presidency Hard Court Championships or Bombay Hard Court Championships, also called the Bombay Presidency Hard Courts, was an international combined men's and women's tennis clay court tournament founded in 1924. The championships were played at the Hindu Gymkhana, Bombay, India. The championships ran until 1950 before being discontinued.

== History ==
Tennis was introduced to India in the 1880s by British Army and Civilian Officers. In 1924 The Bombay Presidency Hard Court Championships were established in Bombay, India and played on clay courts at the Hindu Gymkhanaa. After World War two it decreased in popularity and was discontinued.

== Finals ==
=== Men's singles ===
Incomplete roll

Year	Winners	Runners-up	Score
1924	(United Kingdom) George H. Perkins	(British Raj) Andrew Cyril Pereira	6-2, 6-0
1925	(British Raj) Raja S. Raya Aiyar	(British Raj) Charles W. Gonsalves	6-4, 6-2
1926	(British Raj) Udupi Diggavi Ranga Rao	(British Raj) N.B. Bhagwat	6-4, 6-1
1927	(British Raj) Raja S. Raya Aiyar (2)	(British Raj) P. Rangaswami	3-6, 6-3, 6-3
1928	(British Raj) Raja S. Raya Aiyar (3)	(British Raj) P. Rangaswami	2-6, 6-1, 6-4
1929	(British Raj) Raja S. Raya Aiyar (4)	(British Raj) D.M. Khatao	7-5, 6-2
1930	(British Raj) Udupi Diggavi Ranga Rao (2)	(British Raj) B.H. Khardekar	6-3 6-0
1931-32	Not held		
1933	(British Raj) Anant Gajanan Gupte	(British Raj) Andrew Cyril Pereira	6-8 6-0 6-4
1934	(British Raj) Edward Vivian Bobb	(British Raj) Janmeja Charanjiva	5-7 7-5 6-0
1935	(British Raj) Edward Vivian Bobb (2)	(British Raj) B.H. Khardekar	6-3, 6-3
1936	(British Raj) Syed Abdul Azim	(Denmark) Finn Bekkevold	6-3, 6-2
1937	(British Raj) Yaswanath-Rao Savur	(British Raj) Jimmy Mehta	7-5 6-3
1938	(British Raj) Edward Vivian Bobb (3)	(British Raj) Bernard Thomas Blake	9-7 2-6 6-3
1939	(British Raj) Jimmy Mehta	(British Raj) Syed Abdul Azim	6-0 6-4
1940	(British Raj) Edward Vivian Bobb (4)	(British Raj) Rasi Kumara Sinhji	6-4 6-3
1942	(British Raj) Ghaus Mohammed Khan	(British Raj) M.V. Bobbjee	6-4 6-2
1943-46	Not held		

=== Women's singles ===
Incomplete roll

Year	Winners	Runners-up	Score
1925	(British Raj) Mrs F. Portlock	(United Kingdom) Annie Nepean Clayton	4-6, 6-2, 6-1
1926	(United Kingdom) Annie Nepean Clayton	(British Raj) Mrs A.L. Cooper	6-1, 7-5
1927	(British Raj) Khama Row	(Australia) Olive Stebbing	6-3, 6-2
1928	(United Kingdom) Annie Nepean Clayton	(British Raj) Mrs H.E. Jones	3-6, 6-1, 6-1
1929	(British Raj) Mrs T. Marshall	(Australia) Olive Stebbing	6-4, 6-0
1930	(British Raj) Leela Row	(British Raj) Mrs M.P. McDougall	6-1, 6-3
1931-32	Not held		
1933	(British Raj) Leela Row (2)	(British Raj) Mrs M.E. Stephens	6-1, 6-1
1934	(British Raj) Leela Row (3)	(British Raj) Meher Dubash	6-1, 6-1
1935	(British Raj) Leela Row (4)	(British Raj) Mrs M.C. Captain	6-0, 6-0
1936	(British Raj) Leela Row (5)	(British Raj) Meher Dubash	6-3, 6-2
1937	(British Raj) Leela Row (6)	(British Raj) Laura Woodbridge	6-1, 6-4
1938	(British Raj) Leela Row (7)	(British Raj) Meher Dubash	6-0, 6-1
1939	(British Raj) Leela Row (8)	(British Raj) Parin Dinshaw	2-6, 6-2, 7-5
1940	(British Raj) Leela Row (9)	(British Raj) Khanum Haji	6-4, 6-0
1942	(British Raj) Khanum Haji	(British Raj) Laura Woodbridge	6-1, 7-5
1943-46	Not held		
1947	(India) Khanum Haji Singh	(India) Leela Row Dayal	7-5, 6-2
1948-49	Not held		
1950	(India) Leela Row Dayal (10)	(India) Promilla Khanna	6-4, 6-3
