= East India Championships =

Defunct tennis tournament
- Founded: 1920; 106 years ago
- Abolished: 1978; 48 years ago
- Location: Calcutta, West Bengal, India
- Surface: Grass

The East India Championships, also known as the East India Lawn Tennis Championships, was a combined men's and women's grass court tennis tournament founded in 1920 as the Calcutta Championships. In 1935 its name was changed. The championships were played at the Calcutta South Club, Calcutta, Bengal, India and ran until 1978 before they were discontinued.

== History ==
Tennis was introduced to India in the 1880s by British Army and civilian officers. In 1920, the East India Championships were founded. In 1969, the East India Championships were held in conjunction with the All Assam Hard Court Championships. The championships ran until 1970 before they were discontinued.

== Venue ==
The Calcutta South Club was founded in 1920. Its current facilities consist of the six original grass courts, In 1985 the club built six new clay courts, and in 2004 it added five asphalt-based rubberized hard courts.

== Finals ==
=== Men's singles ===
(incomplete roll)

Year	Champions	Runner-up	Score
1933	(Italy) Giorgio de Stefani	(India) Dip Narain Kapoor	7–5, 6–4, 6–2
1935	(Czechoslovakia) Ladislav Hecht	(Czechoslovakia) Roderich Menzel	2–6, 3–6, 6–3, 6–1, 7–5
1936	(New Zealand) Alan Stedman	(India) Ghaus Mohammed Khan	7–5, 6–3, 3–6, 6–8, 6–4
1937	(India) Ghaus Mohammed Khan	(India) Subba Sawhney	6–2, 4–6, 7–5, 6–3
1938	(United States) Don McNeil	(India) Ghaus Mohammed Khan	6–4, 6–4, 6–3
1940	(India) Subba Sawhney	(India) Jimmy Mehta	6–1, 6–1, 6–0
1941	(India) Ghaus Mohammed Khan (2)	(India) Iftikhar Ahmed Khan	7–5, 6–2, 2–6, 6–2
1942	(United States) Hal Surface	(India) Dilip Bose	6–3, 6–0, 6–3
1943	(United States) Hal Surface (2)	(India) Dilip Bose	6–1, 6–2, 6–2
1944	(India) Jimmy Mehta	(India) Tiny Misra	6–4, 6–4, 6–4
1968	(Romania) Ion Tiriac	(India) Jaidip Mukerjea	6–4, 4–6, 6–2, 5–7, 6–4
1969	(Romania) Ilie Nastase	(Poland) Tadeusz Nowicki	6–4, 2–6, 6–1
1970	(Romania) Ion Tiriac (2)	(Socialist Federal Republic of Yugoslavia) Zeljko Franulovic	6–4, 6–4, 6–3
1977	(India) Jay Royappa	(India) Sashi Menon	6–3, 7–5
1978	(India) Shanker Krishnan	(India) Premjit J. Lall	6–3, 3–6, 6–2

=== Women's singles ===
(incomplete roll)

Year	Champions	Runner-up	Score
1925	(India) Jenny Sandison		
1926	(India) Jenny Sandison (2)		
1927	(India) Jenny Sandison (3)	(United Kingdom) Lena McKenna	walkover
1928	(India) Jenny Sandison (4)	(United Kingdom) Mrs E.S. Graham	6–4, 6–1
1929	(India) Jenny Sandison (5)	(United Kingdom) Mrs E. Jordan	6–3, 6–2
1930	(India) Jenny Sandison (6)	(United Kingdom) Effie Hemmant	8–6, 6–4
1931	(India) Jenny Sandison (7)	(United Kingdom) Marjorie Stork	3–6, 6–3, 7–5
1932	(Italy) Lucia Valerio	(India) Jenny Sandison	3–6, 6–3, 8–6
1933	(India) Jenny Sandison (8)	(India) Esther G. Bonjour	6–4, 6–0
1934	(India) Jenny Sandison (9)	(India) Margaret Parrott	7–5, 6–3
1935	(India) Jenny Boland (10)	(United Kingdom) Olga Webb	6–4, 3–6, 6–2
1936	(United Kingdom) Olga Webb McInnes	(India) Miss Harvey Johnston	6–2, 6–3
1937	(India) Jenny Boland (11)	(India) Leela Row	6–3, 7–5
1938	(India) Jenny Boland (12)	(India) Laura Woodbridge	6–3, 7–5
1942	(India) Laura Woodbridge	(India) Hyacinth Cargin	6–4, 6–4
1946	(Dominion of Ceylon) Doreen Sansoni	(India) Sarah Mody	6–1, 10–12, 6–0
1968	(Romania) Judith Dibar	(United States) Alice Tym	8–6, 8–6
