= 1926 International Lawn Tennis Challenge =

1926 edition of the International Lawn Tennis Challenge

Details
- Duration: 8 May – 11 September 1926
- Edition: 21st
- Teams: 24

Champion
- Winning nation: United States

The 1926 International Lawn Tennis Challenge was the 21st edition of what is now known as the Davis Cup. 19 teams would enter the Europe Zone, while 5 would enter the America Zone.

France defeated Japan in the Inter-Zonal play-off, but would fall to the United States in a rematch of 1925's Challenge Round. The final was played at the Germantown Cricket Club in Philadelphia, Pennsylvania, United States on 9–11 September.

== America Zone ==
=== Draw ===
Quarterfinals
Mexico City, Mexico
Mexico	1
Japan	4

Semifinals
San Francisco, CA, United States (grass)
Japan	5
Philippines	0
Havana, Cuba (clay)
Cuba	3
Canada	2

Final
Montreal, Canada (grass)
Japan	5
Cuba	0

=== Final ===
Japan vs. Cuba

Japan
5
Mount Royal Tennis Club, Montreal, Canada
19–21 August 1926
Grass

Cuba
0

			1	2	3	4	5
1	(Japan) (Cuba)	Takeichi Harada; Rogelio Paris	7; 5	6; 0	6; 3
2	(Japan) (Cuba)	Tsumio Tawara; Vicente Banet	9; 7	6; 1	6; 2
3	(Japan) (Cuba)	Takeichi Harada / Tsumio Tawara; Raúl Chacón / Rogelio Paris	6; 4	6; 3	6; 2
4	(Japan) (Cuba)	Tsumio Tawara; Rogelio Paris	6; 2	6; 0	6; 2
5	(Japan) (Cuba)	Teizo Toba; Vicente Banet	6; 2	6; 2	6; 2

== Europe Zone ==
=== Draw ===
First Round; 27 April-9 May
Italy	5
Romania	0
Netherlands	3
Belgium	2
South Africa	4
Portugal	1

Second Round; 8–22 May
Dublin, Ireland (grass)
Ireland	2
Spain	3
Barcelona, Spain (clay)
Argentina	3
Hungary	2
Harrogate, England (clay)
Great Britain	5
Poland	0
Rome, Italy (clay)
Italy	3
Netherlands	2
South Africa	w/o
Austria
Malmö, Sweden
Sweden	3
Switzerland	2
Prague, Czechoslovakia
Czechoslovakia	4
India	1
Copenhagen, Denmark (clay)
Denmark	0
France	5

Quarterfinals; 24 May-2 June
Barcelona, Spain (clay)
Spain	3
Argentina	1
Rome, Italy (clay)
Great Britain	3
Italy	2
Kensington, England (clay)
South Africa	1
Sweden	4
Prague, Czechoslovakia (clay)
Czechoslovakia	0
France	3

Semifinals; 9–16 July
Barcelona, Spain (clay)
Spain	1
Great Britain	4
Stockholm, Sweden (clay)
Sweden	0
France	5

Final; 24–26 July
Cabourg, France (clay)
Great Britain	0
France	5

=== Final ===
France vs. Great Britain

France
5
Garden Tennis Club, Cabourg, France
24–26 July 1926
Clay

Great Britain
0

			1	2	3	4	5
1	(France) (United Kingdom)	Henri Cochet; Colin Gregory	7; 5	4; 6	7; 9	7; 5	6; 0
2	(France) (United Kingdom)	René Lacoste; Noel Turnbull	6; 4	6; 4	6; 4
3	(France) (United Kingdom)	Jean Borotra / Jacques Brugnon; Gordon Crole-Rees / Charles Kingsley	6; 2	6; 0	6; 3
4	(France) (United Kingdom)	Pierre Henri Landry; Colin Gregory	6; 3	6; 2	6; 1
5	(France) (United Kingdom)	Jacques Brugnon; Noel Turnbull	4; 6	1; 6	6; 2	6; 4	6; 0

== Inter-Zonal Final ==
France vs. Japan

France
3
West Side Tennis Club, Forest Hills, NY, United States
26–28 August 1926
Grass

Japan
2

			1	2	3	4	5
1	(France) (Japan)	Henri Cochet; Tsumio Tawara	1; 6	4; 6	7; 5	6; 3	6; 2
2	(France) (Japan)	René Lacoste; Takeichi Harada	4; 6	6; 4	3; 6	7; 9
3	(France) (Japan)	Jacques Brugnon / Henri Cochet; Takeichi Harada / Tsumio Tawara	6; 0	6; 0	6; 2
4	(France) (Japan)	René Lacoste; Tsumio Tawara	6; 1	6; 3	6; 2
5	(France) (Japan)	Henri Cochet; Takeichi Harada	1; 6	3; 6	6; 0	4; 6

== Challenge Round ==
United States vs. France

United States
4
Germantown Cricket Club, Philadelphia, PA, United States
9–11 September 1926
Grass

France
1

			1	2	3	4	5
1	(United States) (France)	Bill Johnston; René Lacoste	6; 0	6; 4	0; 6	6; 0
2	(United States) (France)	Bill Tilden; Jean Borotra	6; 2	6; 3	6; 3
3	(United States) (France)	Vincent Richards / Richard Norris Williams; Jacques Brugnon / Henri Cochet	6; 4	6; 4	6; 2
4	(United States) (France)	Bill Johnston; Jean Borotra	8; 6	6; 4	9; 7
5	(United States) (France)	Bill Tilden; René Lacoste	6; 4	4; 6	6; 8	6; 8

== See also ==
- 1926 Wightman Cup
