= India International Championships =

Defunct tennis tournament
- Founded: 1923; 102 years ago
- Abolished: 1960; 65 years ago
- Location: Calcutta, West Bengal, India
- Venue: Calcutta South Club
- Surface: Grass

The India International Championships was a men's tennis tournament was founded in 1923. The tournament was played at the Calcutta Cricket Club grounds, Calcutta, Bengal, India. The championships ran until 1960 before it was discontinued.

== History ==
Tennis was introduced to India in the 1880s by British Army and Civilian Officers. In 1923 the India International Championships were established and played at the Calcutta South Club, Calcutta, West Bengal, India. The championships were staged until 1960 when they were abolished.

== Venue ==
The Calcutta South Club was founded in 1920 it also organised the Calcutta Lawn Tennis Championships that later became known as the East India Lawn Tennis Championships. Its current facilities consist of the six original grass courts, In 1985 the Club built six new clay courts, and in 2004 it added five asphalt-based rubberized hard courts.
