= 1977 Indian Open =

- Date: 28 November – 4 December
- Edition: 5th
- Category: Grand Prix (1 Star)
- Draw: 32S / 16D
- Prize money: $50,000
- Surface: Clay / outdoor
- Location: Bombay, India

Champions

Singles
- (India) Vijay Amritraj

Doubles
- (United States) Mike Cahill / (United States) Terry Moor
- Indian Open

The 1977 Indian Open was a men's tennis tournament played on outdoor clay courts in Bombay, India. It was the fifth edition of the tournament and was held from 28 November through 4 December 1977. The tournament was part of the 1 Star tier of the Grand Prix tennis circuit. Second-seeded Vijay Amritraj won the singles title, his third at the event after 1973 and 1975.

== Finals ==
=== Singles ===
(India) Vijay Amritraj defeated (United States) Terry Moor 7–6, 6–4

- It was Amritraj's 2nd singles title of the year and the 10th of his career.

=== Doubles ===
(United States) Mike Cahill / (United States) Terry Moor defeated (Mexico) Marcello Lara / (India) Jasjit Singh 6–7, 6–4, 6–4
