= 1976 Indian Open =

- Date: 22–28 November
- Edition: 4th
- Category: Grand Prix (1 Star)
- Draw: 32S / 16D
- Prize money: $50,000
- Surface: Clay / outdoor
- Location: Bangalore, India

Champions

Singles
- (Australia) Kim Warwick

Doubles
- (Australia) Bob Carmichael / (Australia) Ray Ruffels
- Indian Open

The 1976 Indian Grand Prix was a men's tennis tournament played on outdoor clay courts in Bangalore, India. It was the fourth edition of the tournament and was held from 22 November through 28 November 1976. The tournament was part of the 1 Star tier of the Grand Prix Circuit. Kim Warwick won the singles title.

== Finals ==
=== Singles ===
(Australia) Kim Warwick defeated (India) Sashi Menon 6–1, 6–2 or 6–1, 6–1 (Note: Sources differ over the correct score.)

- It was Warwick's first singles title of his career.

=== Doubles ===
(Australia) Bob Carmichael / (Australia) Ray Ruffels defeated (India) Chiradip Mukerjea / (India) Bhanu Nunna 6–2, 7–6
