= Aleksandar Popović (1920s tennis player) =

Yugoslav tennis player

- Native name: Александар Поповић
- Country (sports): Yugoslavia
- Born: Belgrade, Serbia

Aleksandar Popović (Serbian Cyrillic: Александар Поповић, Serbo-Croatian pronunciation: [alě̞ksaːndar poːpoʋitɕ] was a Yugoslav tennis player of Serbian ethnicity.

== Biography ==
Aleksandar Popović was born in Belgrade. In 1926 he was invited to a non-Davis Cup match against Greece, which Greece won. He became the Yugoslavian national champion in singles in 1927. His final lasted only 24 games, with a final score of 6:2, 6:3, 6:1. Popović was one of the early baseliner players who hit a dozen cross-court shots before converting a point a strategy that suited him well. He was triumphant in the doubles with the same easy manner, which took him only one game more to finish the final (6:2, 6:3, 6:2).

Fortunately for Popović, György Dungyersky, the original line-up member for the Kingdom of Yugoslavia Davis Cup team in their 1928 Davis Cup first round match against Finland, got sick. As he was a reserve player he stepped in to replace him. Rain was a constant factor during the match and the meeting lasted seven days instead of the usual three.^{[a]} The Yugoslavians didn't have much expectations on the doubles as this marked the first time Popović paired with Franjo Šefer, while the Finnish enlisted the seasoned duo of Arne Grahn and Bo Grotenfeld to oppose them.^{[a]} Less than a month later, at the championship of Yugoslavia in Zagreb, Popović retained his title in the international field. In the semifinals he had a tough duel with Podvineć, which he won in three sets. In the final he won with Dr. Müller as his partner.

After World War II he emigrated to Switzerland, where he no longer played tennis and changed his surname.

== Notes ==
- ^{a} According to the Tennis Association of Serbia, the Davis Cup website is incorrect. Thus, the outcome of these matches is unsure. The dates marked are the originally scheduled three days and the players field is also incomplete. Due to the rain delay, Popović couldn't have more time to wait for his match and traveled from Zagreb; he was replaced by the second reserve, Aleksandar Podvineć.

== Works cited ==
- Šoškić, Čedomir (2012). Тениски савез Србије Тенис без граници 1922–2012. [Tennis Association of Serbia, Tennis without borders 1922-2012] (PDF) (in Serbian). Belgrade, Serbia: Tennis Association of Serbia. p. 254. Archived from the original (PDF) on 30 December 2013.
