= Bengal Championships =

Defunct tennis tournament
- Founded: 1887; 139 years ago
- Abolished: 1979; 47 years ago
- Location: Calcutta, West Bengal, India
- Surface: Grass

The Bengal Championships was a combined men's and women's grass court tournament founded in 1887 as the Bengal Lawn Tennis Championships then the second oldest tournament in India. The tournament was played at the Calcutta Cricket Club grounds, Calcutta, West Bengal, India. The championships ran until 1979 before it was discontinued.

== History ==
Tennis was introduced to India in the 1880s by British Army and Civilian Officers. In 1887 the Bengal Lawn Tennis Championships was inaugurated at Calcutta. British players initially dominated the tennis tournaments in India. In 1917 Mr. N.S. Nyer became the first Indian to win the men's singles championship. The championships ran until 1970 but were discontinued

== Venue ==
The first edition of the championships was played at the Calcutta Cricket Club (founded in 1792) grounds.

== Past finals ==
=== Men's singles ===
(incomplete roll)

Year	Champions	Runner-Up	Score
1887	(England) L.C. Osbourne	(England) Gilbert Mahon	def.
1888	(England) Gilbert Mahon	(United Kingdom) James Hechle	5–7, 8–7, 7–8, 8–6, 6–1
1889	(United Kingdom) James Hechle	(United Kingdom) W. H. Gormon	3–0 sets
1890	(United Kingdom) Reginald Gamble	(United Kingdom) E. Pearce	def.
1891	(Scotland) Henry Fleming	(United Kingdom) George Colville	6–0, 6–1, 6–2
1892	(United Kingdom) Reginald Gamble (2)	(United Kingdom) James Hechle	def.
1893	(United Kingdom) Reginald Gamble (3)	(United Kingdom) James Hechle	6–3, 6–4, 4–6, 6–2
1894	(Scotland) Henry Fleming (2)	(United Kingdom) Reginald Gamble	1–6, 2–6, 6–4, 6–3, 6–3
1895	(Scotland) Henry Fleming (3)	(United Kingdom) Reginald Gamble	4–6, 6–2, 6–2, 2–6, 6–3
1896	(United Kingdom) Hugh Davies	(Scotland) Henry Fleming	6–3, 6–1, 6–4
1897	(United Kingdom) Reginald Gamble (4)	(United Kingdom) Hugh Davies	6–0, 6–4, 6–3
1898	(Scotland) Ralph Kidd	(United Kingdom) Arthur Hallward	6–2, 6–3, 8–6
1899	(Scotland) Henry Fleming (4)	(Scotland) Ralph Kidd	walkover
1900	(Scotland) Henry Fleming (5)	(Scotland) Ralph Kidd	2–6, 5–7, 6–3, 6–2, 6–0
1901	(Scotland) Henry Fleming (6)	(Scotland) Ralph Kidd	6–4, 7–5, 2–6, 6–4
1902	(United Kingdom) Philip Pearson	(United Kingdom) E.O. Elliott	7–5, 6–1, 6–0
1903	(United Kingdom) H. Nelson-Wright	(United Kingdom) Philip Pearson	walkover
1904	(United Kingdom) James Hechle (2)	(India) Syed Ahmed	?
1905	(United Kingdom) James Hechle (3)	(India) S.N. Mitra	?
1906	(United Kingdom) James Hechle (4)	(United Kingdom) Edmund Atkinson	6–4, 6–4, 6–4
1907	(United Kingdom) Edmund Atkinson	(United Kingdom) Frederick Warden	4–6, 1–6, 6–3, 7–5, 6–3
1908	(United Kingdom) Edmund Atkinson (2)	(United Kingdom) J.M. Laing	6–1, 6–0, 6–2
1909	(United Kingdom) Edmund Atkinson (3)	(India) Lewis Deane	6–3, 6–4, 7–5
1910	(United Kingdom) Frederick Warden	(United Kingdom) Charles Pritchett	0–6, 6–2, 3–6, 6–4, 6–1
1911	(United Kingdom) Frederick Warden (2)	(United Kingdom) J.M. Laing	6–4, retd.
1912	(Republic of Ireland) Charles Scroope	(India) Kunwar Maharaj Singh	4–6, 6–3, 6–3, 6–2
1913	(Japan) Zenzo Shimizu	(India) Mohammed Sleem	6–2, 5–7, 4–6, 6–0, 6–1
1914	(United Kingdom) Algernon Kingscote	(Japan) Zenzo Shimizu	6–4, 3–6, 6–0, 6–1
1915	(India) Lewis Deane	(Republic of Ireland) Francis Boxwell	6–0, 4–6, 6–1, 4–6, 6–4
1916	(Japan) Zenzo Shimizu (2)	(United Kingdom) S.C. Macadam	def.
1917	(Republic of Ireland) Francis Boxwell	(India) N.S. Iyer	6–4, 6–3, 7–9, 6–3
1918	(Japan) Zenzo Shimizu (3)	(India) Lewis Deane	6–4, 0–6, 4–6, 6–3, 6–2
1919	(Japan) Zenzo Shimizu (4)	(India) Lewis Deane	6–4, 6–3, 7–5
1920	(Japan) Zenzo Shimizu (5)	(India) N.S. Iyer	6–2, 6–3, 8–6
1921	(Japan) Sunao Okamoto	(United States) C. Travelia	6–4, 6–4, 6–3
1922	(India) N.S. Iyer	(United Kingdom) Michael Perkins	4–6, 6–4, 6–2, 6–4
1923	(Japan) Sunao Okamoto (2)	(India) N.S. Iyer	walkover
1924	(United Kingdom) George H. Perkins	(Japan) Sunao Okamoto	walkover
1925	(Japan) Sunao Okamoto (3)	(India) Sandford Wilson Bobb	6–4, 6–3, 6–2
1926	(India) Syed Anwar Yusoof	(United Kingdom) J. Robson	10–8, 6–1, 7–5
1927	(India) Edward Vivian Bobb	(India) Raghubir Dayal	9–7, 8–6, 6–2
1928	(Japan) Sunao Okamoto (4)	(India) Pershotam Lal Mehta	6–1, 6–4, 6–4
1929	(United Kingdom) George H. Perkins (2)	(India) Pershotam Lal Mehta	4–6, 6–1, 6–4, 8–6
1930	(Japan) Miwa Ueda	(United States) Leonard Brooke Edwards	3–6, 6–2, 7–5, 3–6, 6–4
1931	(United Kingdom) Pat Hughes	(United Kingdom) George H. Perkins	4–6, 6–1, 6–1, 6–0
1932	(United Kingdom) Walter Michelmore	(India) S.J. Mathew's	6–4, 1–6, 7–5, 6–2
1933	(United Kingdom) Walter Michelmore (2)	(India) C.L. Mehta	5–7, 6–2, 4–1, retd.
1934*	(India) Sohan Lal	(United Kingdom) Walter Michelmore	5–7, 6–4, 6–3, 6–2
1934**	(United Kingdom) Douglas Hodges		
1935	(United Kingdom) Douglas Hodges	(India) Sohan Lal	5–7, 7–5, 4–6, 6–3, 6–3
1936	(India) Sidney Beatty	(France) Emmanuel du Plaix	7–5, 6–3
1937	(India) Yudishtra Singh	(India) Atri Madan Mohan	7–5, 6–3, 1–6, 6–0
1938	(India) Yudishtra Singh (2)	(India) Atri Madan Mohan	3–1 sets
1945	(India) Atri Madan Mohan	(India) Irshad Hossein	6–3, 3–6, 6–3, 6–1
1946	(India) Dilip Bose	(India) Atri Madan Mohan	6–2, 6–4, 4–6, 4–6, 6–4
1948	(India) Naresh Kumar	(India) Sumant Misra	6–3, 1–6, 4–6, 6–4, 6–1
1949	(India) Sumant Misra	(India) Naresh Kumar	5–7, 4–6, 6–2, 6–3, 6–2
1950	(India) Naresh Kumar (2)	(India) Sumant Misra	?
1951	(India) Naresh Kumar (3)	(India) Sumant Misra	4–6, 9–7, 6–1, 4–6, 6–4
1953	(India) Kurshed Madan	(India) Naresh Kumar	6–4, 8–6, 6–4
1977	(India) Chiradip Mukerjea	(India) Gaurav Misra	6–3, 6–3
