= 1973 Indian Open =

- Date: 15 – 20 October
- Edition: 1st
- Category: Grand Prix (Grade B)
- Draw: 32S / 16D
- Surface: Clay / outdoor
- Location: New Delhi, India

Champions

Singles
- (India) Vijay Amritraj

Doubles
- (United States) Jim McManus / (Mexico) Raúl Ramírez
- Indian Open

The 1973 Indian Open was a men's tennis tournament played on outdoor clay courts in New Delhi, India. It was the inaugural edition of the event and was held from 15 October through 20 October 1973. The tournament was part of the Group B tier of the Grand Prix tennis circuit. Vijay Amritraj won the singles title.

== Finals ==
=== Singles ===
(India) Vijay Amritraj defeated (Australia) Mal Anderson 6–4, 5–7, 8–9, 6–3, 11–9

=== Doubles ===
(United States) Jim McManus / (Mexico) Raúl Ramírez defeated (India) Anand Amritraj / (India) Vijay Amritraj 6–2, 6–4
