= Russell Young (tennis) =

New Zealand tennis player and army officer

- Born: 25 June 1902; Wellington, New Zealand
- Died: 1990; Surrey, England
- Military career
- Allegiance: New Zealand
- Branch: New Zealand Military Forces
- Rank: Colonel
- Commands: Māori Battalion (1943–44)
- Conflicts: Second World War; North African campaign; First Battle of El Alamein; Second Battle of El Alamein; Italian campaign; Battle of Monte Cassino
- Awards: Distinguished Service Order
- Other work: Tennis player, business executive

Colonel Russell Richard Thomas Young, DSO (25 June 1902 – 1990) was a New Zealand Davis Cup player, army officer, and corporate executive.

== Early life ==
Young was born in Wellington on 25 June 1902. His parents were Theodosia Evelyn Young and Arthur Young.

== Tennis career ==
Young went up to Jesus College, Cambridge where he read Chemistry and took a tennis Blue, before pursuing an advanced degree. In 1927, as a member (and later captain) of the Cambridge University Lawn Tennis Club, Young undertook a sporting tour of Germany, with teammates including future Wimbledon finalist Bunny Austin, and the comedian Kenneth Horne. In the same year, Young competed at the Wimbledon Championships in the Men's Doubles.

Young represented New Zealand in the 1928 Davis Cup, reaching the quarter-finals. At the outbreak of the Second World War, he was living in London and working as an executive for Shell.

== Second World War ==
Young was commissioned in the New Zealand Military Forces, and fought in North Africa and Italy. As a captain and company commander, he was the only member of the 22nd Battalion to escape after much of the battalion was encircled and captured at Ruweisat Ridge during First Battle of El Alamein. To complete this escape he trekked for four days and nights across the Libyan desert with limited supplies and only the stars to guide him. The commander of the New Zealand Division, Major General Howard Kippenberger recalled in his memoirs that:

It looked like becoming a habit for our senior officers to get captured, escape, and have breakfast with me. The practice was continued by Russell Young, one of the Twenty-second company commanders. He escaped at Daba, tramped back and somehow got through both lines and reached the Twenty-third in time for breakfast with me. As I had twice found for myself, the most difficult part was getting back through our own suspicious posts. He was very indignant that I would not allow him to stay in the field but packed him back to Maadi, a walking skeleton.

Young later served as the commanding officer of the Māori Battalion.

During the Italian Campaign, Young was awarded a Distinguished Service Order by Lieutenant General Sir Bernard Freyberg for his conduct during the Battle of Monte Cassino. During the Rimini assault, Young recorded in his diary:

At night the Maoris would hold song singing gatherings, and limited quantities of vino would help liven matters up a little. It was a treat for a pakeha to listen to their melodious voices. Often I was invited to one or other of these impromptu concerts, a pleasure indeed to me. I was tempted time and again to accede to requests for a solo but I managed to resist all offers.

The Official History of New Zealand in the Second World War 1939–45 records that:

Another event on 29 October [1944] that created much interest was the recording of messages to be broadcast to the folks at home at Christmas. A percentage of men from each company had their voices recorded, some in Maori and some in English, but Colonel Young, after speaking in English, sent a message in Maori on behalf of the battalion as a whole. His accent might not have been that of a Maori orator but his gesture was much appreciated by the troops... November the 18th was an important day for the battalion. Colonel Young announced that he was marching out on furlough and that the battalion would again be commanded by a Maori. Padre Huata reviewed the Colonel's career with the Maoris, a career that ranked second only to Colonel Dittmer's in length but was the longest in actual fighting command. It was with the deepest regret that he, on behalf of the troops and as their kaumatua, had to say ‘Haere e te Rangitira.' The Colonel was visibly moved as he made his reply. At 11.59 p.m. that night command passed to Lieutenant-Colonel A. Awatere, MC, with Major Henare as his second-in-command."

== Postwar ==
Following the Second World War, Young returned to the business world, serving as a corporate director. From 1952, he took up residence in Trumpeters' House one of the surviving Tudor-era buildings in the grounds of Richmond Palace. He died in Surrey in 1990.
