= 1978 Indian Open =

- Date: 27 November – 3 December
- Edition: 6th
- Category: Grand Prix
- Draw: 32S / 16D
- Prize money: $50,000
- Surface: Clay / outdoor
- Location: Calcutta, India

Champions

Singles
- (France) Yannick Noah

Doubles
- (India) Sashi Menon / (United States) Sherwood Stewart
- Indian Open

The 1978 Championships of India was a men's tennis tournament played on outdoor clay courts in Calcutta, India. It was the sixth edition of the tournament and was held from 27 November through 3 December 1978. The tournament was part of the 1978 Grand Prix tennis circuit. Fifth-seeded Yannick Noah won the singles title.

== Finals ==
=== Singles ===
(France) Yannick Noah defeated (France) Pascal Portes 6–3, 6–2

- It was Noah's second singles title of the year and of his career.

=== Doubles ===
(India) Sashi Menon / (United States) Sherwood Stewart defeated (France) Gilles Moretton / (France) Yannick Noah 7–6, 6–4
