= André Laloux =

Belgian tennis player

Personal information
- Nationality: Belgian
- Born: 13 July 1897 Liège
- Died: 28 January 1985 (aged 87) Liège

Sport
- Sport: Tennis

André Henri Marie Laloux (13 July 1897 – 28 January 1985) was a Belgian tennis player. He competed in the men's doubles event at the 1920 Summer Olympics.
