= Calcutta South Club =

Tennis club in West Bengal, India

- Formation: 1920; 106 years ago
- Type: Private Members Club
- Legal status: Active
- Purpose: Tennis Club and Training Center
- Location: Woodburn Park Road, Kolkata, India

Calcutta South Club is a historic lawn tennis club and tennis training centre in Kolkata, India. The club is on Woodburn Park Road beside Woodburn Park, located adjacent to the Bhawanipur Education Society College. Maximum tournaments and tennis clinics held by Mr. Akhtar Ali the former National and Davis Cup Coach of India.

== History ==
The club was established in 1920 to provide a tennis venue for all communities within the city. In 1959, it was made into a Ltd. company where the members are its shareholders. In addition to its six historic grass (lawn) courts, over time the Club added six clay (1985) and five asphalt-based rubberized courts (2004), making it one of the few clubs worldwide providing all three surfaces for play.

The club is known as "the cradle of the game (lawn tennis) in the country (India)," as it nurtured many talents, including Dilip Bose, Jaidip Mukherjea, Premjit Lal, Naresh Kumar (tennis), Akhtar Ali, Zeeshan Ali, Leander Paes, and Syed Fazaluddin, all of whom were Davis Cup players for the country of India.

The first National Lawn Tennis Championships of India was held at the Club in 1946, and was won by Dilip Bose.

== Notable tournaments ==
- East India Championships
- Indian Open
- National Lawn Tennis Championships of India
