= Anand Amritraj =

Indian tennis player (born 1951)

- Born: 20 March 1951 (age 75) Madras, Tamil Nadu, India (now Chennai, Tamil Nadu)
- Height: 1.85 m (6 ft 1 in)
- Retired: yes
- Plays: Right-handed (one-handed backhand)
- Prize money: $332,133

Singles
- Career record: 195–170
- Career titles: 0
- Highest ranking: No. 74 (6 November 1974)

Grand Slam singles results
- French Open: 1R (1973, 1974, 1976, 1979)
- Wimbledon: 2R (1973, 1977, 1978)
- US Open: 3R (1974)

Doubles
- Career record: 288–269
- Career titles: 12
- Highest ranking: No. 80 (2 January 1984)

Grand Slam doubles results
- Australian Open: 1R (1984)
- French Open: 3R (1979)
- Wimbledon: SF (1976)
- US Open: QF (1973, 1976)

Team competitions
- Davis Cup: F (1974, 1987)

Anand Amritraj (born 20 March 1951) is an Indian former tennis player and businessman. He, along with brother Vijay Amritraj, led India into the 1974 Davis Cup finals against South Africa, and was a part of the Indian team captained by Vijay Amritraj which reached the final of the Davis Cup in 1987 against Sweden.

== Career ==
Anand Amritraj and his younger brothers, Vijay and Ashok, were among the first Indians to play in top-flight international tour tennis. In 1976, Anand and Vijay were semi-finalists in the Wimbledon men's doubles. Anand was part of the Indian team for 1974 Davis Cup, which advanced to the finals of the tournament and then forfeited the championship to South Africa as the Government of India decided to boycott the match in protest of South Africa's Apartheid policies, and again reached the final in 1987 against Sweden.

His son Stephen Amritraj is an American former professional tennis player who represented India.

He did his schooling from Don Bosco and graduated from Loyola College in Madras.

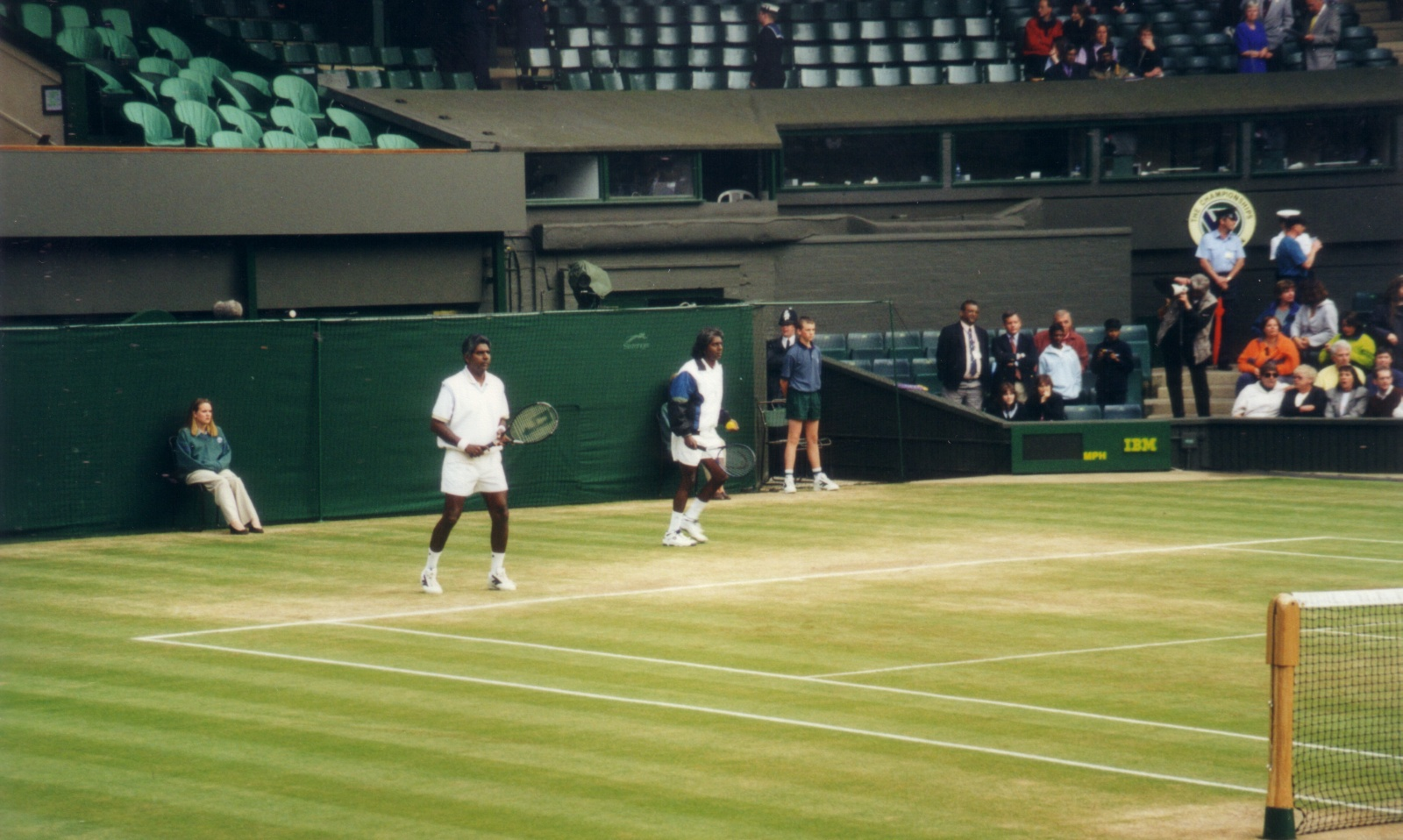
Vijay and Anand Amritraj warm up at 2000 Wimbledon Sr Invitation Doubles Finals in the Centre Court

His daughter-in-law Alison Riske-Amritraj is also a top-50 player on the WTA Tour.

== Career finals ==
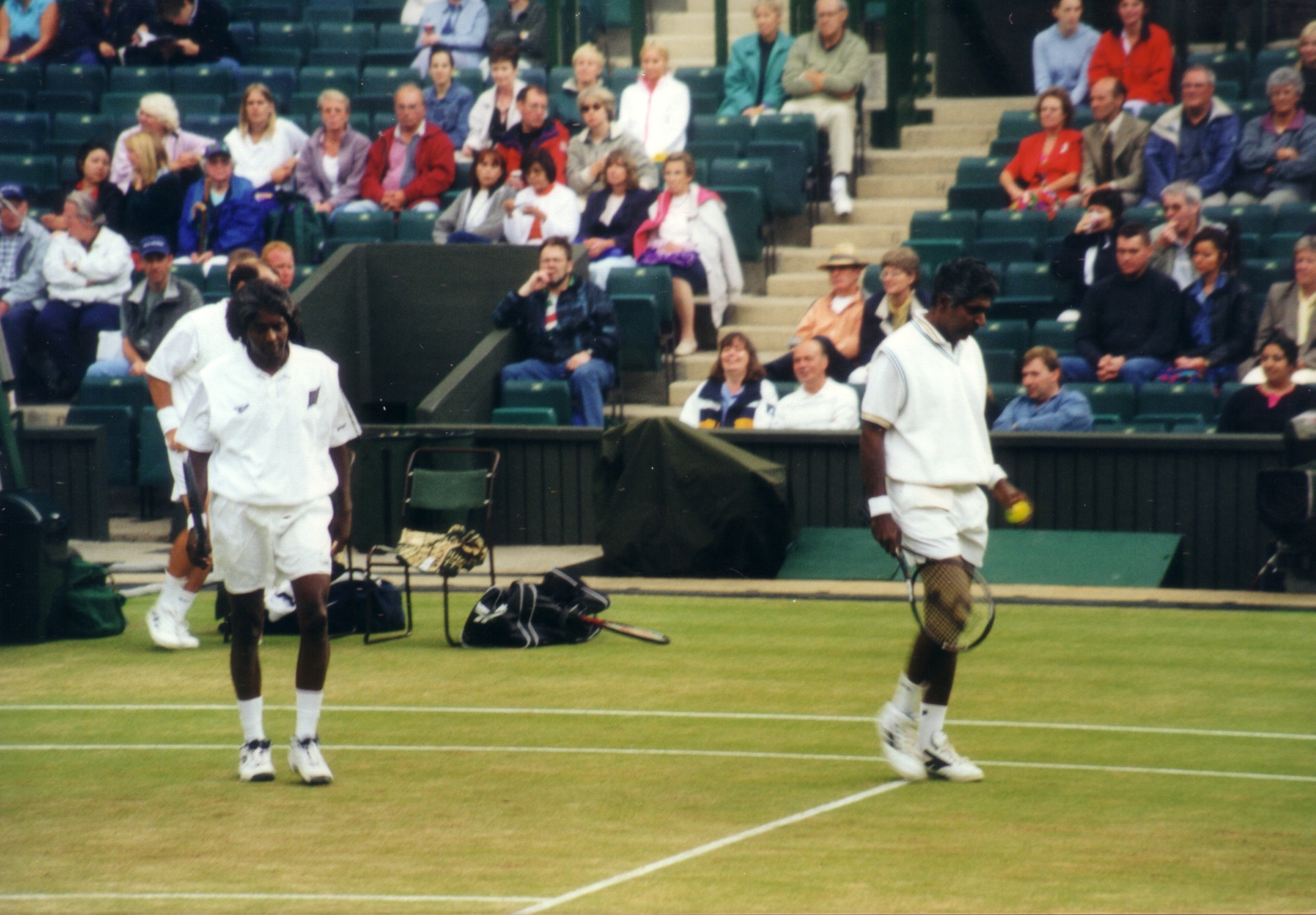
Anand and Vijay Amritraj 2000 Wimbledon Sr Invitation Doubles Finals

=== Doubles: 30 (12–18) ===
Result	W/L	Date	Tournament	Surface	Partner	Opponents	Score
Loss	0–1	Oct 1973	New Delhi, India		(India) Vijay Amritraj	(United States) Jim McManus (Mexico) Raúl Ramírez	2–6, 4–6
Win	1–1	Nov 1973	Christchurch, New Zealand		(United States) Fred McNair	(West Germany) Jürgen Fassbender (New Zealand) Jeff Simpson	w/o
Win	2–1	Nov 1974	Bombay, India	Clay	(India) Vijay Amritraj	(Australia) Dick Crealy (New Zealand) Onny Parun	6–4, 7–6
Loss	2–2	Aug 1974	South Orange, US	Hard	(India) Vijay Amritraj	(United States) Brian Gottfried (Mexico) Raúl Ramírez	6–7, 7–6, 6–7
Win	3–2	Aug 1974	Columbus, US	Hard	(India) Vijay Amritraj	(United States) Tom Gorman (United States) Robert Lutz	w/o
Loss	3–3	Feb 1975	Toronto, Canada	Carpet (i)	(India) Vijay Amritraj	(United States) Dick Stockton (United States) Erik van Dillen	4–6, 5–7, 1–6
Loss	3–4	Mar 1975	Washington DC, US	Carpet (i)	(India) Vijay Amritraj	(United States) Mike Estep (New Zealand) Jeff Simpson	6–7^{(5–7)}, 3–6
Win	4–4	Mar 1975	Atlanta, US	Carpet (i)	(India) Vijay Amritraj	(United Kingdom) Mark Cox (South Africa) Cliff Drysdale	6–3, 6–2
Loss	4–5	Aug 1975	Louisville, US	Clay	(India) Vijay Amritraj	(Poland) Wojciech Fibak (Argentina) Guillermo Vilas	n/p
Win	5–5	Sep 1975	Los Angeles, US	Hard	(India) Vijay Amritraj	(South Africa) Cliff Drysdale (United States) Marty Riessen	7–6, 4–6, 6–4
Loss	5–6	Nov 1975	Calcutta, India	Clay	(India) Vijay Amritraj	(Spain) Juan Gisbert (Spain) Manuel Orantes	6–1, 4–6, 3–6
Win	6–6	Mar 1976	Memphis, US	Carpet (i)	(India) Vijay Amritraj	(United States) Roscoe Tanner (United States) Marty Riessen	6–3, 6–4
Loss	6–7	Nov 1976	Hong Kong	Hard	(Romania) Ilie Năstase	(United States) Hank Pfister (United States) Butch Walts	4–6, 2–6
Loss	6–8	Nov 1976	Manila, Philippines	Hard	(Italy) Corrado Barazzutti	(Australia) Ross Case (Australia) Geoff Masters	0–6, 1–6
Win	7–8	Jun 1977	Queen's Club, London, UK	Grass	(India) Vijay Amritraj	(United Kingdom) David Lloyd (United Kingdom) John Lloyd	6–1, 6–2
Win	8–8	Sep 1978	Mexico City, Mexico	Clay	(India) Vijay Amritraj	(United States) Fred McNair (Mexico) Raúl Ramírez	6–4, 7–5
Loss	8–9	Jan 1979	Baltimore, US	Carpet (i)	(South Africa) Cliff Drysdale	(United States) Marty Riessen (United States) Sherwood Stewart	6–7, 4–6
Loss	8–10	Mar 1979	San Jose, Costa Rica	Hard	(Australia) Colin Dibley	(Romania) Ion Țiriac (Argentina) Guillermo Vilas	4–6, 6–2, 4–6
Loss	8–11	Apr 1979	Cairo, Egypt	Clay	(India) Vijay Amritraj	(Australia) Peter McNamara (Australia) Paul McNamee	5–7, 4–6
Loss	8–12	Aug 1979	Stowe, US	Hard	(Australia) Colin Dibley	(United States) Mike Cahill (United States) Steve Krulevitz	6–3, 3–6, 4–6
Loss	8–13	Mar 1980	San Jose, Costa Rica	Hard	(United States) Nick Saviano	(Chile) Jaime Fillol (Chile) Álvaro Fillol	2–6, 6–7
Loss	8–14	Apr 1980	Los Angeles, US	Hard	(United States) John Austin	(United States) Brian Teacher (United States) Butch Walts	2–6, 4–6
Win	9–14	Apr 1980	São Paulo, Brazil	Carpet (i)	(United States) Fritz Buehning	(Australia) David Carter (New Zealand) Chris Lewis	7–6, 6–2
Loss	9–15	Aug 1980	Atlanta, US	Hard	(United States) John Austin	(United States) Tom Gullikson (United States) Butch Walts	7–6, 6–7, 5–7
Loss	9–16	Apr 1981	Houston, US	Clay	(United States) Fred McNair	(Australia) Mark Edmondson (United States) Sherwood Stewart	4–6, 3–6
Loss	9–17	Aug 1981	Columbus, US	Hard	(India) Vijay Amritraj	(United States) Bruce Manson (United States) Brian Teacher	1–6, 1–6
Win	10–17	Nov 1982	Baltimore, US	Carpet (i)	(United States) Tony Giammalva	(India) Vijay Amritraj (Australia) Fred Stolle	7–5, 6–2
Win	11–17	Nov 1982	Chicago, US	Carpet (i)	(India) Vijay Amritraj	(United States) Mike Cahill (United States) Bruce Manson	3–6, 6–3, 6–3
Loss	11–18	Feb 1983	Delray Beach, US	Clay	(United States) Johan Kriek	(Czechoslovakia) Pavel Složil (Czechoslovakia) Tomáš Šmíd	6–7, 4–6
Win	12–18	Jul 1983	Stuttgart, West Germany	Clay	(United States) Mike Bauer	(Czechoslovakia) Pavel Složil (Czechoslovakia) Tomáš Šmíd	4–6, 6–3, 6–2
