= Teizo Toba =

Japanese tennis player (1901–2002)

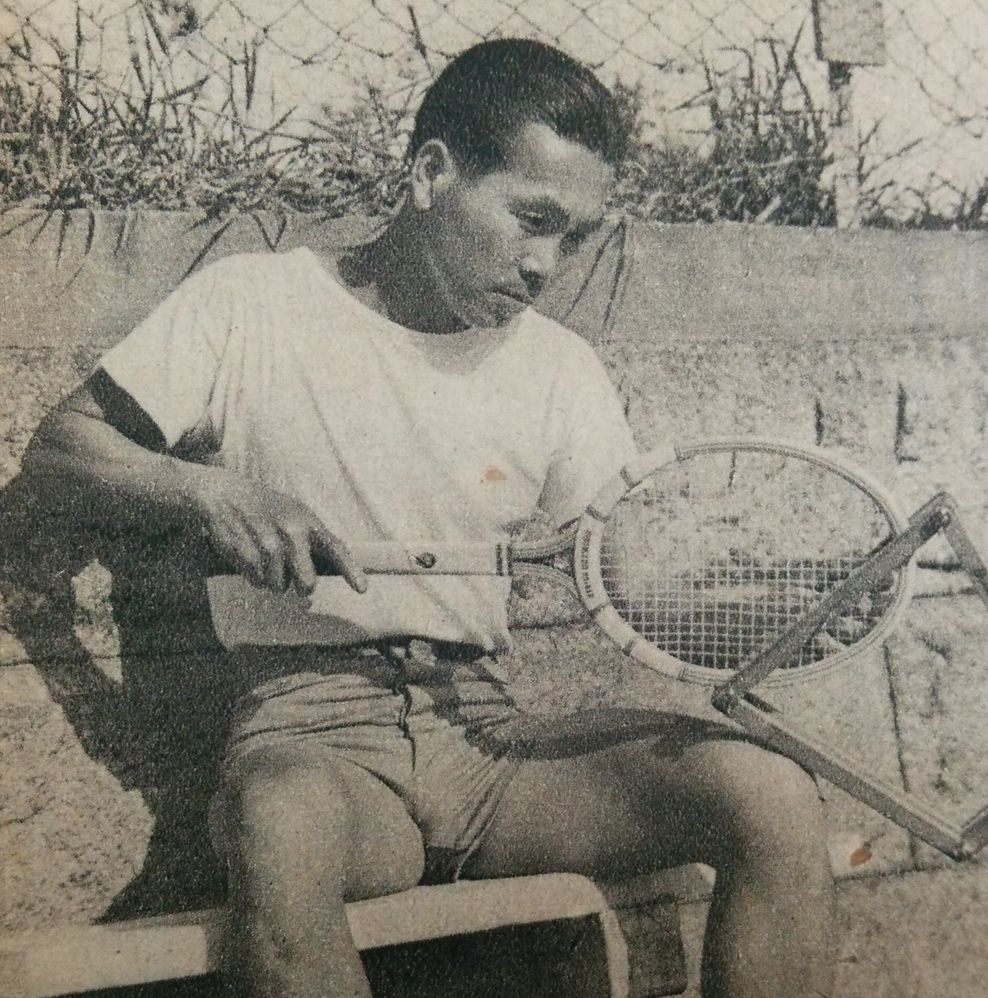
- Country (sports): Japan
- Born: 15 September 1901; Kyoto, Japan
- Died: 18 January 2002 (aged 100); Shibuya, Japan

Singles

Grand Slam singles results
- US Open: 3R (1926)

Teizo Toba (15 September 1901 – 18 January 2002) was a Japanese tennis player.

Born in Kyoto, Toba attended Kobe Commercial High School and in 1923 won the singles title at the Far Eastern Championship Games held in Osaka. He played Davis Cup for Japan from 1926 to 1928, winning four singles and three doubles rubbers. In 1928 he was stand in captain for Japan's tie with Canada in Montreal, which the visiting side claimed 3–1 when Toba came two sets down against Jack Wright in the reverse singles. During these years he had the opportunity to play in the U.S. National Championships, making the singles third round in 1926.

Toba worked in the steel industry and was later an executive advisor for Sumitomo Corporation.

== See also ==
- List of Japan Davis Cup team representatives
