= Vicente Banet =

Cuban tennis player

- Country (sports): Cuba
Medal record
Central American and Caribbean Games
Bronze medal – third place	1930 Havana	Men's singles
Bronze medal – third place	1930 Havana	Men's doubles

Vicente Banet was a Cuban tennis player.

In the 1920s he featured in seven Davis Cup ties for Cuba, winning four singles rubbers. His wins came against Jack Wright (Canada), Gilbert Nunns (Canada), Ignacio De La Borbolla (Mexico) and Ricardo Tapia (Mexico). He was part of Cuba's first ever Davis Cup team, with the island one of five countries to debut in the 1924 International Lawn Tennis Challenge.

Banet won two bronze medals for Cuba at the 1930 Central American and Caribbean Games.

== See also ==
- List of Cuba Davis Cup team representatives
