= 1970 US Open – Men's doubles =

Men's doubles
- 1970 US Open

Final
- Champions: (France) Pierre Barthès (Socialist Federal Republic of Yugoslavia) Nikola Pilić
- Runners-up: (Australia) Roy Emerson (Australia) Rod Laver
- Score: 6–3, 7–6, 4–6, 7–6

Details
- Draw: 64
- Seeds: 8

Events
| Singles | men | women | | boys | girls |
| Doubles | men | women | mixed | boys | girls |
| WC Singles | men | women | quad |
| WC Doubles | men | women | quad |
| Legends | men | women | mixed |
| ← 1969 · | US Open | · 1971 → |

Ken Rosewall and Fred Stolle were the defending US Open men's doubles tennis champions but lost their title after a defeat in the semifinals.

Eighth-seeded Pierre Barthès and Nikola Pilić won the title by defeating sixth-seeded Roy Emerson and Rod Laver 6–3, 7–6, 4–6, 7–6 in the final.

== Seeds ==
1. (Australia) John Newcombe / (Australia) Tony Roche (second round)
2. (Australia) Ken Rosewall / (Australia) Fred Stolle (semifinals)
3. (South Africa) Bob Hewitt / (South Africa) Frew McMillan (quarterfinals)
4. (Romania) Ilie Năstase / (Romania) Ion Țiriac (withdrew)
5. (Netherlands) Tom Okker / (United States) Marty Riessen (third round)
6. (Australia) Roy Emerson / (Australia) Rod Laver (final)
7. (United States) Bob Lutz / (United States) Stan Smith (third round)
8. (France) Pierre Barthès / (Socialist Federal Republic of Yugoslavia) Nikola Pilić (champions)

== Draw ==
=== Key ===
- Q = Qualifier
- WC = Wild card
- LL = Lucky loser
- Alt = Alternate
- ITF = ITF entry
- PR = Protected ranking
- SR = Special ranking
- SE = Special exempt
- JE = Junior exempt
- JR = Junior Accelerator Programme entrant
- CO = College Accelerator Programme entrant
- NG = Next Gen Accelerator Program entrant
- w/o = Walkover
- r = Retired
- d = Defaulted

=== Finals ===
Quarterfinals
(United States) Charlie Pasarell (United States) Erik van Dillen | 6 | 3 | 4 | 6
8 | (France) Pierre Barthès (Socialist Federal Republic of Yugoslavia) Nikola Pilić | 4 | 6 | 6 | 7
(Chile) Patricio Cornejo (Chile) Jaime Fillol | 7 | 7 | 7
(United States) Jimmy Connors (United States) Pancho Gonzales | 5 | 6 | 6
6 | (Australia) Roy Emerson (Australia) Rod Laver | 6 | 6 | 7
3 | (South Africa) Bob Hewitt (South Africa) Frew McMillan | 3 | 4 | 6
(Australia) Bill Bowrey (Australia) Owen Davidson | 7 | 4 | 2 | 6
2 | (Australia) Ken Rosewall (Australia) Fred Stolle | 5 | 6 | 6 | 7

Semifinals
8 | (France) Pierre Barthès (Socialist Federal Republic of Yugoslavia) Nikola Pilić | 6 | 6 | 7 | 7 | 7
(Chile) Patricio Cornejo (Chile) Jaime Fillol | 7 | 7 | 6 | 6 | 5
6 | (Australia) Roy Emerson (Australia) Rod Laver | 6 | 6 | 7
2 | (Australia) Ken Rosewall (Australia) Fred Stolle | 1 | 1 | 6

Final
8 | (France) Pierre Barthès (Socialist Federal Republic of Yugoslavia) Nikola Pilić | 6 | 7 | 4 | 7
6 | (Australia) Roy Emerson (Australia) Rod Laver | 3 | 6 | 6 | 6

=== Top half ===
==== Section 1 ====
First round
1 | (Australia) J Newcombe (Australia) T Roche | w/o
(United States) T Leonard (United States) S Pasarell
(United States) C Pasarell (United States) E van Dillen | w/o
(Spain) A Muñoz (Spain) M Orantes
(Australia) B Howe (Spain) M Santana | 3 | 6 | 6 | 3
(Brazil) T Koch (Brazil) R Marcher | 6 | 3 | 7 | 6
(United States) D Savitt (United States) T Trabert | 3 | 7 | 6 | 3 | 6
(Indonesia) S Sugiarto (Indonesia) A Wijono | 6 | 6 | 4 | 6 | 3
8 | (France) P Barthès (Socialist Federal Republic of Yugoslavia) N Pilić | 6 | 7 | 6
(United States) F Froehling (India) P Lall | 3 | 6 | 3
(United States) W Higgins (Ecuador) E Zuleta | 1 | 4 | 6
(United States) M Machette (United States) G Taylor | 6 | 6 | 7
(Sweden) O Bengtson (Sweden) H Zahr | 4 | 7 | 4 | 3
(United Arab Republic) I El Shafei (Australia) R Keldie | 6 | 5 | 6 | 6
(United States) A Ashe (United States) D Ralston | 7 | 6 | 6 | 3 | 7
(Soviet Union) V Korotkov (Soviet Union) A Metreveli | 6 | 7 | 4 | 6 | 5

Second round
1 | (Australia) J Newcombe (Australia) T Roche | 6 | 3 | 6 | 4
(United States) C Pasarell (United States) E van Dillen | 3 | 6 | 7 | 6
(Brazil) T Koch (Brazil) R Marcher
(United States) D Savitt (United States) T Trabert | w/o
8 | (France) P Barthès (Socialist Federal Republic of Yugoslavia) N Pilić | 7 | 4 | 6 | 6
(United States) M Machette (United States) G Taylor | 6 | 6 | 3 | 2
(United Arab Republic) I El Shafei (Australia) R Keldie | 6 | 6 | 7 | 7
(United States) A Ashe (United States) D Ralston | 7 | 4 | 5 | 6

Third round
(United States) C Pasarell (United States) E van Dillen | 6 | 6 | 6
(United States) D Savitt (United States) T Trabert | 3 | 3 | 4
8 | (France) P Barthès (Socialist Federal Republic of Yugoslavia) N Pilić | 6 | 6 | 6 | 6 | 7
(United Arab Republic) I El Shafei (Australia) R Keldie | 3 | 7 | 7 | 1 | 6

Quarterfinals
(United States) C Pasarell (United States) E van Dillen | 6 | 3 | 4 | 6
8 | (France) P Barthès (Socialist Federal Republic of Yugoslavia) N Pilić | 4 | 6 | 6 | 7

==== Section 2 ====
First round
4 | (Romania) I Năstase (Romania) I Țiriac
(Chile) P Cornejo (Chile) J Fillol | w/o
(Australia) D Crealy (Australia) A Stone | 6 | 5 | 7 | 4 | 6
(United States) R Barth (United States) T Gorman | 3 | 7 | 6 | 6 | 0
(United States) B Seewagen (United States) C Steele | 4 | 6 | 6 | 3
(United States) J Borowiak (Pakistan) H Rahim | 6 | 7 | 4 | 6
(France) J-B Chanfreau (France) J-L Rouyer | w/o
(West Germany) I Buding (West Germany) J Fassbender
5 | (Netherlands) T Okker (United States) M Riessen | w/o
(United States) R Potthast (United States) L Schloss
(Australia) J Cooper (Jamaica) R Russell | 7 | 6 | 3 | 5 | 6
(United States) C McKinley (United States) E Scott | 5 | 4 | 6 | 7 | 7
(United States) J Connors (United States) P Gonzales | w/o
(Czechoslovakia) J Kukal (Romania) P Mărmureanu
(Australia) T Addison (Australia) B Carmichael | 6 | 7 | 6
(New Zealand) B Fairlie (Australia) R Ruffels | 3 | 6 | 3

Second round
(Chile) P Cornejo (Chile) J Fillol | 4 | 7 | 6 | 6
(Australia) D Crealy (Australia) A Stone | 6 | 6 | 4 | 4
(United States) J Borowiak (Pakistan) H Rahim | 6 | 6 | 4 | 5
(France) J-B Chanfreau (France) J-L Rouyer | 7 | 3 | 6 | 7
5 | (Netherlands) T Okker (United States) M Riessen | 7 | 6 | 6
(United States) C McKinley (United States) E Scott | 5 | 4 | 3
(United States) J Connors (United States) P Gonzales | 7 | 7 | 6 | 7
(Australia) T Addison (Australia) B Carmichael | 6 | 6 | 7 | 6

Third round
(Chile) P Cornejo (Chile) J Fillol | 7 | 7 | 6
(France) J-B Chanfreau (France) J-L Rouyer | 6 | 6 | 4
5 | (Netherlands) T Okker (United States) M Riessen | 6 | 3 | 6 | 6
(United States) J Connors (United States) P Gonzales | 7 | 6 | 4 | 7

Quarterfinals
(Chile) P Cornejo (Chile) J Fillol | 7 | 7 | 7
(United States) J Connors (United States) P Gonzales | 5 | 6 | 6

=== Bottom half ===
==== Section 3 ====
First round
(United States) P Gerken (United States) R Walthall | w/o
(Ecuador) P Guzmán (Argentina) T Vázquez
(South Africa) C Drysdale (United States) R Holmberg | 6 | 6 | 6
(Pakistan) MA Ilahi (United States) K Van Nostrand | 3 | 1 | 2
(United Kingdom) G Battrick (United Kingdom) P Curtis | 5 | 6 | 6
(United States) C Graebner (South Africa) R Moore | 7 | 7 | 7
(Canada) P Burwash (United States) R Hernando
6 | (Australia) R Emerson (Australia) R Laver | w/o
(Canada) M Belkin (Canada) J Sharpe
(Rhodesia) R Dowdeswell (Rhodesia) H Irvine | w/o
(South Africa) P Cramer (South Africa) J Hammill | 7 | 3 | 6 | 6
(United States) W Brown (United States) K Stuart | 6 | 6 | 3 | 2
(United States) R McKinley (United States) D Stockton | 7 | 6 | 6
(United States) Donald Dell (United States) Dick Dell | 6 | 4 | 1
(New Zealand) I Crookenden (United States) S Giammalva | 2 | 3 | 1
3 | (South Africa) B Hewitt (South Africa) F McMillan | 6 | 6 | 6

Second round
(United States) P Gerken (United States) R Walthall | 2 | 4 | 4
(South Africa) C Drysdale (United States) R Holmberg | 6 | 6 | 6
(United States) C Graebner (South Africa) R Moore | 6 | 4 | 2
6 | (Australia) R Emerson (Australia) R Laver | 7 | 6 | 6
(Rhodesia) R Dowdeswell (Rhodesia) H Irvine
(South Africa) P Cramer (South Africa) J Hammill | w/o
(United States) R McKinley (United States) D Stockton | 4 | 4 | 6 | 5
3 | (South Africa) B Hewitt (South Africa) F McMillan | 6 | 6 | 4 | 7

Third round
(South Africa) C Drysdale (United States) R Holmberg | 2 | 2 | 6
6 | (Australia) R Emerson (Australia) R Laver | 6 | 6 | 7
(South Africa) P Cramer (South Africa) J Hammill | 7 | 2 | 2 | 2
3 | (South Africa) B Hewitt (South Africa) F McMillan | 6 | 6 | 6 | 6

Quarterfinals
6 | (Australia) R Emerson (Australia) R Laver | 6 | 6 | 7
3 | (South Africa) B Hewitt (South Africa) F McMillan | 3 | 4 | 6

==== Section 4 ====
First round
(Mexico) M Lara (India) J Singh | 5 | 2 | 5
(Chile) L Ayala (France) G Goven | 7 | 6 | 7
(Australia) B Bowrey (Australia) O Davidson | 6 | 6 | 6
(United States) R Fisher (United States) R Tanner | 3 | 4 | 2
(United States) A Fox (Japan) J Kuki
(United States) B Alloo (United States) L Parker | w/o
(Mexico) J Loyo Mayo (Mexico) T Palafox | 3 | 6 | 3
7 | (United States) B Lutz (United States) S Smith | 6 | 7 | 6
(United States) A Olmedo (Ecuador) P Segura | 6 | 7 | 6
(United Kingdom) M Cox (United Kingdom) G Stilwell | 3 | 6 | 4
(United States) J McManus (United States) J Osborne | w/o
(Venezuela) J Andrew (Venezuela) H Hose
(Spain) A Gimeno (United Kingdom) R Taylor | 6 | 3 | 6 | 6
(United States) B Gottfried (United States) S Mayer | 4 | 6 | 1 | 4
(Iran) I Khodaei (Iran) N Nemati
2 | (Australia) K Rosewall (Australia) F Stolle | w/o

Second round
(Chile) L Ayala (France) G Goven | 1 | 1 | 4
(Australia) B Bowrey (Australia) O Davidson | 6 | 6 | 6
(United States) B Alloo (United States) L Parker | 3 | 4 | 6 | 3
7 | (United States) B Lutz (United States) S Smith | 6 | 6 | 4 | 6
(United States) A Olmedo (Ecuador) P Segura | 6 | 4 | 6
(United States) J McManus (United States) J Osborne | 7 | 6 | 7
(Spain) A Gimeno (United Kingdom) R Taylor | 5 | 5 | 2^{r}
2 | (Australia) K Rosewall (Australia) F Stolle | 7 | 7 | 2

Third round
(Australia) B Bowrey (Australia) O Davidson | 7 | 6 | 7
7 | (United States) B Lutz (United States) S Smith | 6 | 4 | 6
(United States) J McManus (United States) J Osborne | 1 | 3 | 4
2 | (Australia) K Rosewall (Australia) F Stolle | 6 | 6 | 6

Quarterfinals
(Australia) B Bowrey (Australia) O Davidson | 7 | 4 | 2 | 6
2 | (Australia) K Rosewall (Australia) F Stolle | 5 | 6 | 6 | 7
