= 1969 US Open – Men's doubles =

Men's doubles
- 1969 US Open

Final
- Champions: (Australia) Ken Rosewall (Australia) Fred Stolle
- Runners-up: (United States) Dennis Ralston (United States) Charlie Pasarell
- Score: 2–6, 7–5, 13–11, 6–3

Details
- Draw: 64
- Seeds: 8

Events
Singles	men	women		boys	girls
Doubles	men	women	mixed	boys	girls
WC Singles	men	women	quad
WC Doubles	men	women	quad
Legends	men	women	mixed
← 1968 ·	US Open	· 1970 →

Bob Lutz and Stan Smith were the defending US Open men's doubles tennis champions but lost their title after a defeat in the third round.

Fifth-seeded Ken Rosewall and Fred Stolle won the title by defeating unseeded Roy Emerson and Charlie Pasarell 2–6, 7–5, 13–11, 6–3 in the final.

== Seeds ==
1. (Australia) John Newcombe / (Australia) Tony Roche (quarterfinals, retired)
2. (Netherlands) Tom Okker / (United States) Marty Riessen (semifinals)
3. (United States) Bob Lutz / (United States) Stan Smith (third round)
4. (Australia) Roy Emerson / (Australia) Rod Laver (semifinals, withdrew)
5. (Australia) Ken Rosewall / (Australia) Fred Stolle (champions)
6. (United States) Arthur Ashe / (United States) Clark Graebner (second round, withdrew)
7. (South Africa) Cliff Drysdale / (United Kingdom) Roger Taylor (third round)
8. (United States) Pancho Gonzales / (United States) Ron Holmberg (second round)

== Draw ==
=== Key ===
- Q = Qualifier
- WC = Wild card
- LL = Lucky loser
- Alt = Alternate
- ITF = ITF entry
- PR = Protected ranking
- SR = Special ranking
- SE = Special exempt
- JE = Junior exempt
- JR = Junior Accelerator Programme entrant
- CO = College Accelerator Programme entrant
- NG = Next Gen Accelerator Program entrant
- w/o = Walkover
- r = Retired
- d = Defaulted

=== Finals ===
Quarterfinals
1	(Australia) John Newcombe (Australia) Tony Roche	4	2^{r}
(United States) Charlie Pasarell (United States) Dennis Ralston	6	3
4	(Australia) Roy Emerson (Australia) Rod Laver	6	6	6
(United States) Jim McManus (United States) Jim Osborne	3	1	4
5	(Australia) Ken Rosewall (Australia) Fred Stolle	6	6	6
(United States) Butch Buchholz (South Africa) Raymond Moore	3	4	2
(Australia) Dick Crealy (Australia) Allan Stone	14	1	10
2	(Netherlands) Tom Okker (United States) Marty Riessen	16	6	12

Semifinals
(United States) Charlie Pasarell (United States) Dennis Ralston	w/o
4	(Australia) Roy Emerson (Australia) Rod Laver
5	(Australia) Ken Rosewall (Australia) Fred Stolle	6	10	6
2	(Netherlands) Tom Okker (United States) Marty Riessen	1	8	4

Final
(United States) Charlie Pasarell (United States) Dennis Ralston	6	5	11	3
5	(Australia) Ken Rosewall (Australia) Fred Stolle	2	7	13	6

=== Top half ===
==== Section 1 ====
First round
1	(Australia) J Newcombe (Australia) T Roche	6	6	8
(United States) H Fitzgibbon (United States) C Richey	4	4	6
(Spain) A Gimeno (Spain) M Santana	w/o
(United States) P Gerken (United States) F Robbins
(Argentina) E Álvarez (Venezuela) H Hose	6	7	7	9	3
(United States) R Leach (United States) R Potthast	8	9	5	7	6
(United States) W Blocher (United States) R Tanner	5	6	6	7	6
(Brazil) R Marcher (United States) H Rapp	7	2	4	9	2
7	(South Africa) C Drysdale (United Kingdom) R Taylor	6	3	6	6
(Chile) P Cornejo (Chile) J Fillol	2	6	3	4
(United States) P Collins (France) Y Petra	0	4	0
(West Germany) I Buding (New Zealand) O Parun	6	6	6
(India) P Lall (India) J Mukerjea	11	7	6
(Romania) S Dron (Romania) P Mărmureanu	9	5	4
(United States) C Pasarell (United States) D Ralston	6	9	6
(Mexico) J Loyo Mayo (Jamaica) R Russell	3	7	2

Second round
1	(Australia) J Newcombe (Australia) T Roche	6	6	6
(Spain) A Gimeno (Spain) M Santana	4	2	2
(United States) R Leach (United States) R Potthast	6	7	7
(United States) W Blocher (United States) R Tanner	4	5	5
7	(South Africa) C Drysdale (United Kingdom) R Taylor	4	6	6	21
(West Germany) I Buding (New Zealand) O Parun	6	2	4	19
(India) P Lall (India) J Mukerjea	6	12	4
(United States) C Pasarell (United States) D Ralston	8	14	6

Third round
1	(Australia) J Newcombe (Australia) T Roche	6	6	6
(United States) R Leach (United States) R Potthast	3	4	4
7	(South Africa) C Drysdale (United Kingdom) R Taylor	5	5	3
(United States) C Pasarell (United States) D Ralston	7	7	6

Quarterfinals
1	(Australia) J Newcombe (Australia) T Roche	4	2^{r}
(United States) C Pasarell (United States) D Ralston	6	3

==== Section 2 ====
First round
4	(Australia) R Emerson (Australia) R Laver	6	9	6
(New Zealand) I Crookenden (New Zealand) L Gerrard	2	7	0
(United States) D Dell (United States) V Seixas	1	6	6	3
(Canada) K Carpenter (Canada) J Sharpe	6	2	8	6
(Czechoslovakia) J Kodeš (Czechoslovakia) J Kukal	8	6	6	6
(Romania) I Năstase (Romania) I Țiriac	10	4	2	2
(Australia) B Carmichael (United Arab Republic) I El Shafei	6	6	7	3^{r}
(France) T Bernasconi (France) G Goven	4	4	9	3
6	(United States) A Ashe (United States) C Graebner	6	6	6
(Chile) A Cornejo Seckel (Chile) JR Pinto Bravo	4	4	3
(United States) S Giammalva (United States) D Savitt	3	6	5	3
(United States) J McManus (United States) J Osborne	6	2	7	6
(United Kingdom) G Battrick (United Kingdom) G Stilwell	8	6	9	2	4
(France) J-B Chanfreau (France) J-L Rouyer	10	4	7	6	6
(United States) R McKinley (United States) D Stockton	6	6	6
(United States) J Rombeau (United States) G Taylor	1	2	4

Second round
4	(Australia) R Emerson (Australia) R Laver	6	6	6
(Canada) K Carpenter (Canada) J Sharpe	3	2	4
(Czechoslovakia) J Kodeš (Czechoslovakia) J Kukal	6	6	3	14
(France) T Bernasconi (France) G Goven	3	4	6	12
6	(United States) A Ashe (United States) C Graebner
(United States) J McManus (United States) J Osborne	w/o
(France) J-B Chanfreau (France) J-L Rouyer	4	6	5	4
(United States) R McKinley (United States) D Stockton	6	4	7	6

Third round
4	(Australia) R Emerson (Australia) R Laver	6	6	8
(Czechoslovakia) J Kodeš (Czechoslovakia) J Kukal	4	4	6
(United States) J McManus (United States) J Osborne	5	7	6	9	6
(United States) R McKinley (United States) D Stockton	7	5	3	11	3

Quarterfinals
4	(Australia) R Emerson (Australia) R Laver	6	6	6
(United States) J McManus (United States) J Osborne	3	1	4

=== Bottom half ===
==== Section 3 ====
First round
(Sweden) O Bengtson (Sweden) M Carlstein	13	9	6
(United States) R Barth (United States) D Dell	11	7	4
(New Zealand) R Hawkes (United States) R Susman	0	4	4
(Australia) B Bowrey (Australia) O Davidson	6	6	6
(United States) C McKinley (Mexico) T Palafox	5	3	4
(France) P Barthès (Socialist Federal Republic of Yugoslavia) N Pilić	7	6	6
(Socialist Federal Republic of Yugoslavia) Ž Franulović (Socialist Federal Republic of Yugoslavia) N Špear
5	(Australia) K Rosewall (Australia) F Stolle	w/o
(United States) T Leonard (United States) E van Dillen	4	4	9	4
(Chile) L Ayala (United States) E Scott	6	6	7	6
(United Kingdom) D Lloyd (New Zealand) J McDonald	1	0	4
(United States) B Buchholz (South Africa) R Moore	6	6	6
(Ecuador) P Guzmán (Ecuador) M Olvera	9	6	6
(United States) G Mulloy (United States) B Talbert	7	4	4
(Brazil) T Koch (Denmark) T Ulrich	3	7	2
3	(United States) B Lutz (United States) S Smith	6	9	6

Second round
(Sweden) O Bengtson (Sweden) M Carlstein	4	5	1
(Australia) B Bowrey (Australia) O Davidson	6	7	6
(France) P Barthès (Socialist Federal Republic of Yugoslavia) N Pilić	3	4	2
5	(Australia) K Rosewall (Australia) F Stolle	6	6	6
(Chile) L Ayala (United States) E Scott	2	4	6
(United States) B Buchholz (South Africa) R Moore	6	6	8
(Ecuador) P Guzmán (Ecuador) M Olvera	4	3	3
3	(United States) B Lutz (United States) S Smith	6	6	6

Third round
(Australia) B Bowrey (Australia) O Davidson	1	12	3	4
5	(Australia) K Rosewall (Australia) F Stolle	6	10	6	6
(United States) B Buchholz (South Africa) R Moore	6	7	6
3	(United States) B Lutz (United States) S Smith	4	5	3

Quarterfinals
5	(Australia) K Rosewall (Australia) F Stolle	6	6	6
(United States) B Buchholz (South Africa) R Moore	3	4	2

==== Section 4 ====
First round
(Canada) M Belkin (Canada) F Tutvin	3	2	6	5
(Australia) D Crealy (Australia) A Stone	6	6	3	7
(Mexico) L-A García (Mexico) M Lara	5	4	6	6	12
(Australia) J Alexander (Australia) P Dent	7	6	3	1	14
(Canada) P Burwash (United States) R Hernando	2	2	2
(United Kingdom) M Cox (United Kingdom) P Curtis	6	6	6
(Australia) T Addison (Australia) R Keldie	3	2	0
8	(United States) P Gonzales (United States) R Holmberg	6	6	6
(United States) M Machette (United States) P Walthall	5	4	6	4
(United States) T Edlefsen (United States) T Gorman	7	6	4	6
(Australia) B Howe (Spain) M Orantes	6	10	7
(France) J-P Courcol (France) P Proisy	4	8	5
(United States) C Steele (United States) P Sullivan	17	7	6	6	6
(United States) B Alloo (United States) D Knight	19	9	4	4	4
(South Africa) R Krog (South Africa) T Ryan	3	1	3
2	(Netherlands) T Okker (United States) M Riessen	6	9	6

Second round
(Australia) D Crealy (Australia) A Stone	6	9	6	6
(Australia) J Alexander (Australia) P Dent	4	11	3	4
(United Kingdom) M Cox (United Kingdom) P Curtis	6	6	6	7
8	(United States) P Gonzales (United States) R Holmberg	3	4	8	5
(United States) T Edlefsen (United States) T Gorman	6	1	15	6
(Australia) B Howe (Spain) M Orantes	2	6	13	3
(United States) C Steele (United States) P Sullivan	3	8	2
2	(Netherlands) T Okker (United States) M Riessen	6	10	6

Third round
(Australia) D Crealy (Australia) A Stone	7	6	6	10
(United Kingdom) M Cox (United Kingdom) P Curtis	9	2	3	8
(United States) T Edlefsen (United States) T Gorman	3	6	4
2	(Netherlands) T Okker (United States) M Riessen	6	8	6

Quarterfinals
(Australia) D Crealy (Australia) A Stone	14	1	10
2	(Netherlands) T Okker (United States) M Riessen	16	6	12
