= 1969 US Open – Men's singles qualifying =

Men's singles qualifying
- 1969 US Open

Events
Singles	men	women		boys	girls
Doubles	men	women	mixed	boys	girls
WC Singles	men	women	quad
WC Doubles	men	women	quad
Legends	men	women	mixed
US Open	· 1970 →

Players who neither had high enough rankings nor received wild cards to enter the main draw of the annual US Open Tennis Championships participated in a qualifying tournament held over several days before the event.

== Qualifiers ==
1. (Canada) Peter Burwash
2. (France) Patrick Proisy
3. (India) Jasjit Singh
4. (United States) Robert Potthast
5. (United States) Larry Turville
6. (Chile) Armando Cornejo Seckel
7. (United States) Michael Sprengelmeyer
8. (United States) Woody Blocher
9. (United States) Peter Fishbach
10. (Australia) Max Senior
11. (United States) Chauncey Steele
12. (United States) Roscoe Tanner
13. (United States) Paul Sullivan
14. (United States) Rudy Hernando
15. (United States) George Taylor
16. (United States) Edward Hoehn
17. (United States) Bailey Brown

== Lucky losers ==
1. (South Africa) John Hammill

== Qualifying draw ==
=== Key ===
- Q = Qualifier
- WC = Wild card
- LL = Lucky loser
- Alt = Alternate
- ITF = ITF entry
- PR = Protected ranking
- SR = Special ranking
- SE = Special exempt
- JE = Junior exempt
- JR = Junior Accelerator Programme entrant
- CO = College Accelerator Programme entrant
- NG = Next Gen Accelerator Program entrant
- w/o = Walkover
- r = Retired
- d = Defaulted

=== First qualifier ===
First round
(Canada) Peter Burwash
(United States) Rodney Susman	w/o
(United States) Dave Harmon
(France) Wanaro N'Godrella	w/o

Qualifying competition
(Canada) Peter Burwash	7	6
(United States) Dave Harmon	5	3

=== Second qualifier ===
First round
(South Africa) John Hammill
(Venezuela) Jaime Andrew	w/o
(France) Patrick Proisy	6	6
(United States) Steve Spiegel	1	4

Qualifying competition
(South Africa) John Hammill	4	6
(France) Patrick Proisy	6	8

=== Third qualifier ===
First round
(Argentina) Lito Álvarez	6	6
(New Zealand) John McDonald	4	3
(India) Jasjit Singh	8	6
(United States) William Monan	6	2

Qualifying competition
(Argentina) Lito Álvarez	1	6	7
(India) Jasjit Singh	6	3	9

=== Fourth qualifier ===
First round	Qualifying competition
	(United States) Robert Potthast	6	5	6
	(United States) Jimmy Connors	4	7	1

=== Fifth qualifier ===
First round	Qualifying competition
	(United States) Larry Turville	10	9
	(United States) Terry Ehlers	8	7

=== Sixth qualifier ===
First round	Qualifying competition
	(Chile) Armando Cornejo Seckel	6	7
	(United States) Steve Ross	2	5

=== Seventh qualifier ===
First round	Qualifying competition
	(United States) Michael Sprengelmeyer	9	6
	(United States) Robert Barker	7	1

=== Eighth qualifier ===
First round	Qualifying competition
	(United States) Woody Blocher	6	4	6
	(France) Thierry Bernasconi	2	6	3

=== Ninth qualifier ===
First round	Qualifying competition
	(United States) Peter Fishbach	6	4	10
	(United States) Jeff Austin	4	6	8

=== Tenth qualifier ===
First round
(Australia) Max Senior	6	6	6
(United States) Inderjit Singh	4	8	3
(Japan) Toki Kobayashi	6	6
(United States) Pancho Walthall	4	3

Qualifying competition
(Australia) Max Senior	6	6
(Japan) Toki Kobayashi	1	4

=== Eleventh qualifier ===
First round
(United States) Roy Sprengelmeyer
(United States) Steven Turner	w/o
(United States) Chauncey Steele	6	7
(Bolivia) Ramiro Benavides	1	5

Qualifying competition
(United States) Roy Sprengelmeyer	2	3
(United States) Chauncey Steele	6	6

=== Twelfth qualifier ===
First round
(United States) Roscoe Tanner	11	6
(United States) Larry Collins	9	3
(The Bahamas) Leo Rolle	6	6
(United States) Steve Krulevitz	4	4

Qualifying competition
(United States) Roscoe Tanner	6	6
(The Bahamas) Leo Rolle	1	4

=== Thirteenth qualifier ===
First round	Qualifying competition
	(United States) Paul Sullivan	6	7
	(United States) Gerry Perry	0	5

=== Fourteenth qualifier ===
First round	Qualifying competition
	(United States) Rudy Hernando	6	6
	(United States) Ken Stuart	1	4

=== Fifteenth qualifier ===
First round
(United States) Walter Johnson
(United States) G. Turner Howard III	w/o
(United States) George Taylor
(United States) Jerry Van Linge	w/o

Qualifying competition
(United States) Walter Johnson	6	2
(United States) George Taylor	8	6

=== Sixteenth qualifier ===
First round
(Mexico) Jaime Subirats	4	6	11
(United States) Ralph Howe	6	3	9
(United States) Edward Hoehn	7	6	6
(United States) William Cullen	9	1	2

Qualifying competition
(Mexico) Jaime Subirats	1	6
(United States) Edward Hoehn	6	8

=== Seventeenth qualifier ===
First round
(United States) Bailey Brown	6	8	6
(United States) Robert Odasz	3	10	1
(United States) James Rombeau	5	6	6
(Japan) Jun Kuki	7	0	0

Qualifying competition
(United States) Bailey Brown	6	10	6
(United States) James Rombeau	3	12	3
