= 1969 US Open – Men's singles =

Men's singles
- 1969 US Open

Final
- Champion: (Australia) Rod Laver
- Runner-up: (Australia) Tony Roche
- Score: 7–9, 6–1, 6–2, 6–2

Details
- Draw: 128
- Seeds: 16

Events
Singles	men	women		boys	girls
Doubles	men	women	mixed	boys	girls
WC Singles	men	women	quad
WC Doubles	men	women	quad
Legends	men	women	mixed
← 1968 ·	US Open	· 1970 →

Rod Laver defeated Tony Roche in the final, 7–9, 6–1, 6–2, 6–2 to win the men's singles tennis title at the 1969 US Open. It was his second US singles title and eleventh and last Grand Slam tournament singles title overall. With the win, he completed the Grand Slam, the only man in the Open Era to do so in singles. Laver also became the second man to complete the double career Grand Slam in singles, after Roy Emerson.

Arthur Ashe was the defending champion, but lost in the semifinals to Laver.

== Seeds ==
The seeded players are listed below. Rod Laver is the champion; others show the round in which they were eliminated.

1. (Australia) Rod Laver, (champion)
2. (Australia) John Newcombe, (semifinals)
3. (Australia) Tony Roche, (finals)
4. (United States) Arthur Ashe, (semifinals)
5. (Netherlands) Tom Okker, (first round)
6. (Australia) Ken Rosewall, (quarterfinals)
7. (United States) Clark Graebner, (second round)
8. (South Africa) Cliff Drysdale, (first round)
9. (Australia) Roy Emerson, (quarterfinals)
10. (Australia) Fred Stolle, (quarterfinals)
11. (Spain) Andrés Gimeno, (fourth round)
12. (United States) Stan Smith, (second round)
13. (United States) Richard Pancho Gonzales, (fourth round)
14. (Spain) Manuel Santana, (fourth round)
15. (United States) Marty Riessen, (fourth round)
16. (United States) Dennis Ralston, (fourth round)

== Draw ==
=== Key ===
- Q = Qualifier
- WC = Wild card
- LL = Lucky loser
- r = Retired

=== Final eight ===
Quarterfinals
1	(Australia) Rod Laver	4	8	13	6
9	(Australia) Roy Emerson	6	6	11	4
4	(United States) Arthur Ashe	8	6	6
6	(Australia) Ken Rosewall	6	3	4
(United States) Butch Buchholz	1	7	7	0
3	(Australia) Tony Roche	6	9	5	6
10	(Australia) Fred Stolle	9	6	1	4	11
2	(Australia) John Newcombe	7	3	6	6	13

Semifinals
1	(Australia) Rod Laver	8	6	14
4	(United States) Arthur Ashe	6	3	12
3	(Australia) Tony Roche	3	6	4	6	8
2	(Australia) John Newcombe	6	4	6	3	6

Final
1	(Australia) Rod Laver	7	6	6	6
3	(Australia) Tony Roche	9	1	2	2

=== Section 1 ===
First round
1	(Australia) R Laver	6	6	6
(Mexico) LA García	2	4	2
LL	(South Africa) J Hammill	3	4	2
(Chile) J Pinto Bravo	6	6	6
(United States) E Scott	6	10	6
(United States) E van Dillen	3	8	1
(United States) B MacKay	6	3	3	3
(Chile) J Fillol Sr.	2	6	6	6
16	(United States) D Ralston	7	6	10
(Canada) KA Carpenter	5	3	8
(United Kingdom) G Stilwell	8	6	9
Q	(United States) G Taylor	6	2	7
(Australia) J Alexander	6	6	6
Q	(United States) M Sprengelmeyer	4	1	0
(United States) T Gorman	6	6	6
Q	(United States) B Brown	2	4	0

Second round
1	(Australia) R Laver	6	7	6
(Chile) J Pinto Bravo	4	5	2
(United States) E Scott	8	6	2	7	7
(Chile) J Fillol Sr.	10	4	6	5	9
16	(United States) D Ralston	6	11	6
(United Kingdom) G Stilwell	3	9	4
(Australia) J Alexander	6	3	2	10
(United States) T Gorman	4	6	6	12

Third round
1	(Australia) R Laver	8	6	6
(Chile) J Fillol Sr.	6	1	2
16	(United States) D Ralston	11	4	6	7
(United States) T Gorman	9	6	4	5

Fourth round
1	(Australia) R Laver	6	4	4	6	6
16	(United States) D Ralston	4	6	6	2	3

=== Section 2 ===
First round
8	(South Africa) C Drysdale	2	3	4
(Australia) O Davidson	6	6	6
(West Germany) I Buding	1	10	1
(Sweden) ON Bengtson	6	12	6
(United States) R Holmberg	6	6	6
Q	(France) P Proisy	2	4	3
(Ecuador) M Olvera	6	6	4	6	0
(United States) R Barth	3	1	6	8	6
9	(Australia) R Emerson	6	6	6
(Socialist Federal Republic of Yugoslavia) Z Franulović	2	4	3
(Spain) M Orantes	11	7	3	6	9
(United States) P Gerken	9	9	6	4	7
(Ecuador) E Zuleta	6	3	4
(United States) R Leach	8	6	6
(New Zealand) O Parun	4	4	6	2
(Australia) W Bowrey	6	6	4	6

Second round
(Australia) O Davidson	10	1	3	4
(Sweden) ON Bengtson	8	6	6	6
(United States) R Holmberg	5	3	3
(United States) R Barth	7	6	6
9	(Australia) R Emerson	6	7	6
(Spain) M Orantes	1	5	3
(United States) R Leach	6	2	1	3
(Australia) W Bowrey	3	6	6	6

Third round
(Sweden) ON Bengtson	5	13	3
(United States) R Barth	7	15	6
9	(Australia) R Emerson	6	9	6
(Australia) W Bowrey	3	7	2

Fourth round
(United States) R Barth	3	0	3
9	(Australia) R Emerson	6	6	6

=== Section 3 ===
First round
4	(United States) A Ashe	6	6	7
(United States) D Stockton	2	2	5
(United States) C McKinley	5	5	10
(Australia) D Crealy	7	7	12
(United States) J Osborne	6	6	6
Q	(Canada) P Burwash	2	2	2
(Australia) R Howe	3	0	4
(India) P Lall	6	6	6
14	(Spain) M Santana	6	7	6
(United States) W Higgins	2	5	1
(France) J-P Courcol	6	6	6
(United States) D Dell	3	4	3
(United States) R McKinley	6	6	6
(Sweden) M Carlstein	1	3	3
(New Zealand) R Hawkes	6	3	5
(Romania) P Mărmureanu	8	6	7

Second round
4	(United States) A Ashe	6	6	4	6
(Australia) D Crealy	4	3	6	3
(United States) J Osborne	4	6	6	7
(India) P Lall	6	3	4	5
14	(Spain) M Santana	6	6	6
(France) J-P Courcol	1	1	1
(United States) R McKinley	6	6	6
(Romania) P Mărmureanu	4	4	3

Third round
4	(United States) A Ashe	5	6	6	6
(United States) J Osborne	7	4	4	2
14	(Spain) M Santana	6	6	7	6
(United States) R McKinley	4	4	9	2

Fourth round
4	(United States) A Ashe	7	6	6	6
14	(Spain) M Santana	5	1	8	4

=== Section 4 ===
First round
6	(Australia) K Rosewall	6	5	6	4	6
(South Africa) P Cramer	2	7	4	6	4
Q	(United States) L Turville	6	2	2
(South Africa) R Moore	8	6	6
(India) J Mukerjea	4	8	4
(Socialist Federal Republic of Yugoslavia) N Pilić	6	10	6
(South Africa) T Ryan	7	5	7	6
(Romania) I Țiriac	9	7	5	8
12	(United States) S Smith	6	6	6
(Chile) P Rodríguez	0	3	2
(Romania) I Năstase	4	6	6	6
(New Zealand) I Crookenden	6	4	3	0
(New Zealand) L Gerrard	3	2	2
(United Kingdom) G Battrick	6	6	6
(United Arab Republic) I El Shafei	6	6	8
(Canada) J Sharpe	4	3	6

Second round
6	(Australia) K Rosewall	6	6	6
(South Africa) R Moore	3	2	2
(Socialist Federal Republic of Yugoslavia) N Pilić	6	6	6
(Romania) I Țiriac	1	2	0
12	(United States) S Smith	7	10	5	3
(Romania) I Năstase	5	12	7	6
(United Kingdom) G Battrick	3	6	3	14
(United Arab Republic) I El Shafei	6	3	6	16

Third round
6	(Australia) K Rosewall	6	6	6
(Socialist Federal Republic of Yugoslavia) N Pilić	4	0	2
(Romania) I Năstase	6	1
(United Arab Republic) I El Shafei	0	0	r.

Fourth round
6	(Australia) K Rosewall	6	7	4	6
(Romania) I Năstase	1	5	6	3

=== Section 5 ===
First round
(France) JL Rouyer	7	1	6	6
(South Africa) R Krog	5	6	3	4
(Australia) A Stone	6	3	6	6
(United States) T Edlefsen	4	6	3	3
(Australia) P Dent	6	8	2	3
(United States) J McManus	3	10	6	6
(United States) M Estep	3	4	9	1
11	(Spain) A Gimeno	6	6	7	6
(United States) EB Buchholz	6	6	6
(Mexico) A Palafox	2	4	2
(Czechoslovakia) J Kodeš	6	6	6
(Romania) S Dron	3	3	4
(United Kingdom) P Curtis	3	3	6	6	6
(Czechoslovakia) J Kukal	6	6	2	4	4
(United Kingdom) M Cox	7	6	0	6	9
5	(Netherlands) T Okker	9	3	6	4	7

Second round
(France) JL Rouyer	6	3	7	2	6
(Australia) A Stone	1	6	5	6	3
(United States) J McManus	6	3	2	2
11	(Spain) A Gimeno	4	6	6	6
(United States) EB Buchholz	6	3	6	4	6
(Czechoslovakia) J Kodeš	2	6	3	6	2
(United Kingdom) P Curtis	9	3	3	3
(United Kingdom) M Cox	7	6	6	6

Third round
(France) JL Rouyer	1	4	3
11	(Spain) A Gimeno	6	6	6
(United States) EB Buchholz	13	6	6
(United Kingdom) M Cox	11	4	4

Fourth round
11	(Spain) A Gimeno	6	3	1	7	3
(United States) EB Buchholz	4	6	6	5	6

=== Section 6 ===
First round
(United States) A Neely	6	3	6	6
Q	(Australia) M Senior	3	6	1	2
(Mexico) M Lara	5	3	8
(Denmark) T Ulrich	7	6	10
(Australia) R Ruffels	7	2	7	6
(Australia) B Carmichael	5	6	5	4
Q	(United States) R Potthast	3	3	4
13	(United States) RP Gonzales	6	6	6
(United States) H Fitzgibbon	6	6	6
Q	(United States) P Fishbach	4	2	4
(Ecuador) P Guzmán	4	4	2
(Chile) L Ayala	6	6	6
(Brazil) T Koch	6	6	6
Q	(Chile) A Cornejo	0	4	2
(United States) R Lutz	11	4	4	7
3	(Australia) T Roche	9	6	6	9

Second round
(United States) A Neely	4	4	3
(Denmark) T Ulrich	6	6	6
(Australia) R Ruffels	2	6	3	6	4
13	(United States) RP Gonzales	6	3	6	3	6
(United States) H Fitzgibbon	4	6	8	3	4
(Chile) L Ayala	6	3	6	6	6
(Brazil) T Koch	3	2	4
3	(Australia) T Roche	6	6	6

Third round
(Denmark) T Ulrich	6	4	6	6	2
13	(United States) RP Gonzales	3	6	4	8	6
(Chile) L Ayala	2	3	1
3	(Australia) T Roche	6	6	6

Fourth round
13	(United States) RP Gonzales	3	12	5	0
3	(Australia) T Roche	6	10	7	6

=== Section 7 ===
First round
(United States) C Richey	6	3	6	6
(United States) B Cheney	4	6	1	4
(United States) F Robbins	22	9	6	8	6
(United States) D Dell	20	7	8	10	4
Q	(United States) W Blocher	6	11	9
Q	(United States) C Steele III	4	9	7
(Venezuela) H Hose	4	2	2
10	(Australia) F Stolle	6	6	6
Q	(United States) R Hernando	4	2	2
(Australia) T Addison	6	6	6
(United Kingdom) D Lloyd	2	6	1	2
(United States) C Pasarell	6	4	6	6
(United Kingdom) R Taylor	7	3	6	6
(France) G Goven	5	6	2	3
(United States) T Mozur	0	5	2
7	(United States) C Graebner	6	7	6

Second round
(United States) C Richey	6	4	6	6
(United States) F Robbins	4	6	4	4
Q	(United States) W Blocher	1	3	1
10	(Australia) F Stolle	6	6	6
(Australia) T Addison	6	9	6
(United States) C Pasarell	3	7	4
(United Kingdom) R Taylor	4	6	2
7	(United States) C Graebner	6	1	0	r.

Third round
(United States) C Richey	5	8	4	5
10	(Australia) F Stolle	7	6	6	7
(Australia) T Addison	4	6	2
(United Kingdom) R Taylor	6	8	6

Fourth round
10	(Australia) F Stolle	6	6	2	6
(United Kingdom) R Taylor	4	2	6	3

=== Section 8 ===
First round
(Mexico) J Loyo-Mayo	6	9	6
(France) JB Chanfreau	2	7	3
(United States) B Seewagen	6	6	5	1	1
(United States) T Leonard	3	4	7	6	6
(Jamaica) R Russell	6	3	9	3
(Canada) M Belkin	4	6	11	6
Q	(United States) R Tanner	6	3	1	3
15	(United States) M Riessen	1	6	6	6
(Chile) P Cornejo	8	3	2	4
(France) P Barthès	6	6	6	6
(United States) EV Seixas	3	7	5
(Australia) R Keldie	6	9	7
Q	(India) J Singh	6	4	8	6
Q	(United States) T Hoehn	1	6	6	2
Q	(United States) P Sullivan	2	3	3
2	(Australia) J Newcombe	6	6	6

Second round
(Mexico) J Loyo-Mayo	6	6	6
(United States) T Leonard	2	2	3
(Canada) M Belkin	6	1	3	0
15	(United States) M Riessen	4	6	6	6
(France) P Barthès	8	7	2	9
(Australia) R Keldie	6	5	6	7
Q	(India) J Singh	3	4	4
2	(Australia) J Newcombe	6	6	6

Third round
(Mexico) J Loyo-Mayo	3	2	4
15	(United States) M Riessen	6	6	6
(France) P Barthès	8	1	2	2
2	(Australia) J Newcombe	6	6	6	6

Fourth round
15	(United States) M Riessen	6	3	4	23
2	(Australia) J Newcombe	4	6	6	25

Preceded by 1969 Wimbledon Championships – Men's singles	Grand Slam men's singles	Succeeded by 1970 Australian Open – Men's singles
