= 1970 US Open – Men's singles =

Men's singles
- 1970 US Open

Final
- Champion: (Australia) Ken Rosewall
- Runner-up: (Australia) Tony Roche
- Score: 2–6, 6–4, 7–6^{(5–2)}, 6–3

Details
- Draw: 108
- Seeds: 20

Events
| Singles | men | women | | boys | girls |
| Doubles | men | women | mixed | boys | girls |
| WC Singles | men | women | quad |
| WC Doubles | men | women | quad |
| Legends | men | women | mixed |
- US Open

Ken Rosewall defeated Tony Roche in the final, 2–6, 6–4, 7–6^{(5–2)}, 6–3 to win the men's singles tennis title at the 1970 US Open. It was his second US singles title and seventh Grand Slam tournament singles title overall.

Rod Laver was the defending champion, but lost in the fourth round to Dennis Ralston.

This was the first US Open to feature tiebreaks.

== Seeds ==
The seeded players are listed below. Ken Rosewall is the champion; others show the round in which they were eliminated.

1. (Australia) Rod Laver, (fourth round)
2. (Australia) John Newcombe, (semifinals)
3. (Australia) Ken Rosewall, (champion)
4. (Australia) Tony Roche, (finals)
5. (Australia) Roy Emerson, (fourth round)
6. (Spain) Andrés Gimeno, (first round)
7. (United States) Arthur Ashe, (quarterfinals)
8. (United Kingdom) Roger Taylor, (third round)
9. (Netherlands) Tom Okker, (fourth round)
10. (United States) Cliff Richey, (semifinals)
11. (United States) Stan Smith, (quarterfinals)
12. (South Africa) Cliff Drysdale, (second round)
13. -
14. (United States) Richard Pancho Gonzales, (third round)
15. (Australia) Fred Stolle, (third round)
16. (United States) Clark Graebner, (fourth round)
17. (United States) Marty Riessen, (first round)
18. (Socialist Federal Republic of Yugoslavia) Nikola Pilić, (fourth round)
19. (United States) Dennis Ralston, (quarterfinals)
20. (South Africa) Bob Hewitt, (second round)

== Draw ==
=== Key ===
- Q = Qualifier
- WC = Wild card
- LL = Lucky loser
- r = Retired

=== Final eight ===
Quarterfinals
19 | (United States) Dennis Ralston | 6 | 3 | 4
10 | (United States) Cliff Richey | 7 | 6 | 6
4 | (Australia) Tony Roche | 6 | 7 | 7
(New Zealand) Brian Fairlie | 3 | 5 | 6
11 | (United States) Stan Smith | 2 | 2 | 2
3 | (Australia) Ken Rosewall | 6 | 6 | 6
7 | (United States) Arthur Ashe | 1 | 6 | 7 | 6
2 | (Australia) John Newcombe | 6 | 7 | 5 | 7

Semifinals
10 | (United States) Cliff Richey | 2 | 6 | 1
4 | (Australia) Tony Roche | 6 | 7 | 6
3 | (Australia) Ken Rosewall | 6 | 6 | 6
2 | (Australia) John Newcombe | 3 | 4 | 3

Final
4 | (Australia) Tony Roche | 6 | 4 | 6^{2} | 3
3 | (Australia) Ken Rosewall | 2 | 6 | 7^{5} | 6

=== Section 1 ===
First round

Second round
1 | (Australia) R Laver | 4 | 6 | 6 | 6
(Australia) A Stone | 6 | 2 | 1 | 2
(New Zealand) O Parun | 4 | 5 | 6
(Australia) J Cooper | 6 | 7 | 7
15 | (Australia) F Stolle | 6 | 6 | 6
(Ecuador) P Guzmán | 1 | 2 | 1
19 | (United States) D Ralston | 5 | 6 | 6 | 7
(France) G Goven | 7 | 4 | 4 | 6

Third round
1 | (Australia) R Laver | 6 | 7 | 6
(Australia) J Cooper | 1 | 6 | 3
15 | (Australia) F Stolle | 4 | 6 | 5 | 4
19 | (United States) D Ralston | 6 | 4 | 7 | 6

Round four
1 | (Australia) R Laver | 6 | 5 | 7 | 6 | 3
19 | (United States) D Ralston | 7 | 7 | 5 | 4 | 6

=== Section 2 ===
First round
(Australia) O Davidson | 7 | 6 | 7 | 3 | 4
(Spain) M Santana | 6 | 7 | 6 | 6 | 6
Q | (United States) D Stockton | 6 | 6 | 6
(Ecuador) E Zuleta | 3 | 1 | 4
10 | (United States) C Richey | 6 | 6 | 6
(United States) C Steele III | 4 | 4 | 4
(United States) A Fox | 6 | 7 | 6
(India) J Singh | 2 | 5 | 2
(Canada) M Belkin | 3 | 4 | 3
(France) P Barthès | 6 | 6 | 6
(United States) P Gerken | 6 | 6 | 7
(Canada) J Sharpe | 0 | 3 | 5

Second round
8 | (United Kingdom) R Taylor | 7 | 6 | 6
(United States) B Seewagen | 6 | 1 | 3
(Spain) M Santana | 6 | 6 | 6
Q | (United States) D Stockton | 4 | 3 | 3
10 | (United States) C Richey | 6 | 7 | 6
(United States) A Fox | 1 | 5 | 3
(France) P Barthès | 6 | 6 | 6
(United States) P Gerken | 3 | 4 | 3

Third round
8 | (United Kingdom) R Taylor | 3 | 6 | 6 | 6
(Spain) M Santana | 6 | 7 | 2 | 7
10 | (United States) C Richey | 7 | 6 | 6
(France) P Barthès | 6 | 3 | 4

Round four
(Spain) M Santana | 6 | 6 | 5 | 1
10 | (United States) C Richey | 2 | 7 | 7 | 6

=== Section 3 ===
First round
4 | (Australia) T Roche | 6 | 6 | 6
(United States) E van Dillen | 3 | 4 | 3
(United Kingdom) M Cox | 6 | 6 | 6
Q | (United States) J Connors | 2 | 4 | 2
(United Kingdom) P Curtis | 6 | 6 | 6
(Sweden) H Zahr | 2 | 4 | 0
(United Kingdom) G Stilwell | 4 | 4 | 6 | 5
(India) P Lall | 6 | 6 | 3 | 7
(Pakistan) MA Ilahi | 2 | 6 | 6 | 6 | 6
Q | (United States) S Krulevitz | 6 | 3 | 1 | 7 | 4
(United States) D Dell | 2 | 6 | 5
(United States) W Higgins | 6 | 7 | 7
17 | (United States) M Riessen | 6 | 5 | 6 | 4 | 0
(France) JB Chanfreau | 2 | 7 | 1 | 6 | 6
Q | (Mexico) M Lara | 6 | 3 | 2 | 4
(United States) T Gorman | 4 | 6 | 6 | 6

Second round
4 | (Australia) T Roche | 3 | 7 | 7 | 6
(United Kingdom) M Cox | 6 | 6 | 6 | 2
(United Kingdom) P Curtis | 7 | 6 | 6
(India) P Lall | 6 | 3 | 3
(Pakistan) MA Ilahi | 2 | 4 | 2
(United States) W Higgins | 6 | 6 | 6
(France) JB Chanfreau | 7 | 5 | 5 | 2
(United States) T Gorman | 6 | 7 | 7 | 6

Third round
4 | (Australia) T Roche | 6 | 6 | 6
(United Kingdom) P Curtis | 3 | 1 | 3
(United States) W Higgins | 6 | 3 | 4
(United States) T Gorman | 7 | 6 | 6

Round four
4 | (Australia) T Roche | 6 | 6 | 3 | 6
(United States) T Gorman | 3 | 4 | 6 | 3

=== Section 4 ===
First round
6 | (Spain) A Gimeno | 3 | 4 | 3
(Brazil) T Koch | 6 | 6 | 6
(United States) J McManus | 6 | 6 | 6
(United States) B Alloo | 3 | 4 | 3
(United States) L Schloss | 6 | 6 | 4
(Argentina) Vázquez | 7 | 7 | 6
(United States) P Segura | 7 | 4 | 7 | 6
(Indonesia) A Wijono | 6 | 6 | 5 | 0
12 | (South Africa) C Drysdale | 1 | 6 | 6 | 6
Q | (United States) M Machette | 6 | 3 | 4 | 3
(United States) R Holmberg | 4 | 2 | 3
(New Zealand) B Fairlie | 6 | 6 | 6
(Australia) T Addison | 6 | 6 | 6
Q | (United States) G Taylor | 4 | 3 | 1
(Australia) R Ruffels | 6 | 6 | 2 | 7 | 7
(France) JL Rouyer | 7 | 3 | 6 | 5 | 6

Second round
(Brazil) T Koch | 7 | 4 | 3 | 4
(United States) J McManus | 5 | 6 | 6 | 6
(Argentina) Vázquez | 2 | 6 | 6 | 4 | 6
(United States) P Segura | 6 | 2 | 4 | 6 | 4
12 | (South Africa) C Drysdale | 6 | 3 | 5 | 4
(New Zealand) B Fairlie | 3 | 6 | 7 | 6
(Australia) T Addison | 1 | 4 | 1
(Australia) R Ruffels | 6 | 6 | 6

Third round
(United States) J McManus | 7 | 4 | 5 | 3
(Argentina) Vázquez | 6 | 6 | 7 | 6
(New Zealand) B Fairlie | 4 | 6 | 6 | 6 | 7
(Australia) R Ruffels | 6 | 7 | 2 | 0 | 5

Round four
(Argentina) Vázquez | 4 | 2 | 1
(New Zealand) B Fairlie | 6 | 6 | 6

=== Section 5 ===
First round
(United States) K Van Nostrand | 4 | 2 | 4
(Soviet Union) A Metreveli | 6 | 6 | 6
(Chile) P Cornejo | 7 | 6 | 7
Q | (United States) S Mayer | 6 | 1 | 6
Q | (United States) T Leonard | 1 | 4 | 2
Q | (United States) W Brown | 6 | 6 | 6
(United States) R Lutz | 6 | 6 | 1 | 4
11 | (United States) S Smith | 1 | 7 | 6 | 6
(United Kingdom) G Battrick | 1 | 4 | 4
Q | (United States) J Borowiak | 6 | 6 | 6
Q | (United States) B Gottfried | 7 | 4 | 6 | 1 | 6
Q | (United States) R McKinley | 5 | 6 | 3 | 6 | 7
(West Germany) W Bungert | 4 | 6 | 6 | 6 | 6
(New Zealand) I Crookenden | 6 | 4 | 3 | 7 | 3
(United States) H Fitzgibbon | 6 | 3 | 4
5 | (Australia) R Emerson | 7 | 6 | 6

Second round
(Soviet Union) A Metreveli | 6 | 6 | 6
(Chile) P Cornejo | 3 | 2 | 1
Q | (United States) W Brown | 5 | 3 | 6 | 3
11 | (United States) S Smith | 7 | 6 | 4 | 6
Q | (United States) J Borowiak | 4 | 6 | 6 | 4
Q | (United States) R McKinley | 6 | 7 | 4 | 6
(West Germany) W Bungert | 3 | 3 | 2
5 | (Australia) R Emerson | 6 | 6 | 6

Third round
(Soviet Union) A Metreveli | 6 | 4 | 2
11 | (United States) S Smith | 7 | 6 | 6
Q | (United States) R McKinley | 2 | 4 | 1
5 | (Australia) R Emerson | 6 | 6 | 6

Round four
11 | (United States) S Smith | 6 | 6 | 5 | 6
5 | (Australia) R Emerson | 4 | 3 | 7 | 4

=== Section 6 ===
First round
(Australia) B Carmichael | 4 | 6 | 6 | 6
(Sweden) ON Bengtson | 6 | 3 | 1 | 2
(Chile) J Fillol Sr. | 2 | 2 | 6
18 | (Socialist Federal Republic of Yugoslavia) N Pilić | 6 | 6 | 7
(United States) K Stuart | 3 | 6 | 3
(Soviet Union) V Korotkov | 6 | 7 | 6
(West Germany) I Buding | 2 | 5 | 0 | r.
14 | (United States) RP Gonzales | 6 | 7 | 1
(United States) C Pasarell | 4 | 7 | 7 | 6
(Jamaica) R Russell | 6 | 5 | 6 | 3
(United States) P Fishbach | 6 | 4 | 4
(United States) A Olmedo | 7 | 6 | 6
(West Germany) J Fassbender | 6 | 6 | 6 | 5
Q | (United States) S Pasarell | 7 | 7 | 4 | 7
(United States) R Potthast | 2 | 2 | 4
3 | (Australia) K Rosewall | 6 | 6 | 6

Second round
(Australia) B Carmichael | 3 | 1 | 7 | 1
18 | (Socialist Federal Republic of Yugoslavia) N Pilić | 6 | 6 | 6 | 6
(Soviet Union) V Korotkov | 6 | 3 | 6
14 | (United States) RP Gonzales | 7 | 6 | 7
(United States) C Pasarell | 6 | 6 | 6
(United States) A Olmedo | 3 | 4 | 3
Q | (United States) S Pasarell | 4 | 2 | 0
3 | (Australia) K Rosewall | 6 | 6 | 6

Third round
18 | (Socialist Federal Republic of Yugoslavia) N Pilić | 4 | 6 | 7 | 7
14 | (United States) RP Gonzales | 6 | 2 | 6 | 5
(United States) C Pasarell | 6 | 4 | 4
3 | (Australia) K Rosewall | 7 | 6 | 6

Round four
18 | (Socialist Federal Republic of Yugoslavia) N Pilić | 5 | 7 | 6 | 4
3 | (Australia) K Rosewall | 7 | 6 | 7 | 6

=== Section 7 ===
First round
(Australia) D Crealy | 4 | 6 | 6 | 6 | 2
(United States) F Froehling | 6 | 3 | 7 | 4 | 6
(Chile) L Ayala | 7 | 7 | 4 | 3 | 1
(United States) J Osborne | 6 | 5 | 6 | 6 | 6
Q | (United States) P Walthall | 4 | 2 | 1
(South Africa) F McMillan | 6 | 6 | 6
(United States) T Edlefsen | 1 | 4 | 6
9 | (Netherlands) T Okker | 6 | 6 | 7
(United States) R Barth | 6 | 3 | 6 | 6
Q | (United States) GT Howard | 4 | 6 | 1 | 4
(United Arab Republic) I El Shafei | 4 | 3 | 1
(South Africa) R Moore | 6 | 6 | 6

Second round
(United States) F Froehling | 6 | 3 | 4
(United States) J Osborne | 7 | 6 | 6
(South Africa) F McMillan | 3 | 7 | 3 | 2
9 | (Netherlands) T Okker | 6 | 6 | 6 | 6
(United States) R Barth | 4 | 6 | 6 | 2 | 7
(South Africa) R Moore | 6 | 4 | 1 | 6 | 6
(United States) R Tanner | 7 | 4 | 3 | 4
7 | (United States) A Ashe | 6 | 6 | 6 | 6

Third round
(United States) J Osborne | 3 | 2 | 4
9 | (Netherlands) T Okker | 6 | 6 | 6
(United States) R Barth | 4 | 2 | 3
7 | (United States) A Ashe | 6 | 6 | 6

Round four
9 | (Netherlands) T Okker | 4 | 7 | 2 | 3
7 | (United States) A Ashe | 6 | 6 | 6 | 6

=== Section 8 ===
First round

Second round
(Australia) W Bowrey | 3 | 4 | 6 | 6 | 6
20 | (South Africa) B Hewitt | 6 | 6 | 3 | 2 | 4
(Australia) R Keldie | 1 | 6 | 6 | 4
16 | (United States) C Graebner | 6 | 7 | 4 | 6
Q | (United States) E Scott | 6 | 7 | 7
Q | (Pakistan) H Rahim | 3 | 6 | 6
(Mexico) J Loyo-Mayo | 3 | 3 | 1
2 | (Australia) J Newcombe | 6 | 6 | 6

Third round
(Australia) W Bowrey | 3 | 6 | 7 | 2 | 4
16 | (United States) C Graebner | 6 | 4 | 6 | 6 | 6
Q | (United States) E Scott | 4 | 7 | 1 | 4
2 | (Australia) J Newcombe | 6 | 6 | 6 | 6

Round four
16 | (United States) C Graebner | 4 | 3 | 2
2 | (Australia) J Newcombe | 6 | 6 | 6

| Preceded by 1970 Wimbledon Championships – Men's singles | Grand Slam men's singles | Succeeded by 1971 Australian Open – Men's singles |
