= 1972 Wimbledon Championships – Men's singles qualifying =

Men's singles qualifying
- 1972 Wimbledon Championships

Events
Singles	men	women		boys	girls
Doubles	men	women	mixed	boys	girls
WC Singles	men	women	quad
WC Doubles	men	women	quad
Legends	men	women	seniors

Qualification
Singles	men	women
Doubles	men	women	mixed
- Wimbledon Championships

Players who neither had high enough rankings nor received wild cards to enter the main draw of the annual Wimbledon Tennis Championships participated in a qualifying tournament held one week before the event. Two players withdrew from the main draw after qualifying had commenced, leading to the two highest ranked players who lost in the final qualifying round to be entered into the main draw as lucky losers.

== Qualifiers ==
1. (United States) Sandy Mayer
2. (Italy) Pietro Marzano
3. (United States) Dick Knight
4. (Australia) William Durham
5. (United States) Paul Gerken
6. (United States) Dan Bleckinger
7. (United States) Eugene Scott
8. (United States) Dick R. Bohrnstedt
9. (Australia) Alvin Gardiner
10. (United States) Sherwood Stewart
11. (United States) Butch Seewagen
12. (United States) Jeff Austin
13. (Argentina) Tito Vázquez
14. (United States) Robert Stock
15. (United States) Mike Estep
16. (United Kingdom) Paul Hutchins

== Lucky losers ==
1. (South Africa) André van der Merwe
2. (New Zealand) Robert Clarke

== Qualifying draw ==
Key

- Q = Qualifier
- WC = Wild card
- LL = Lucky loser
- Alt = Alternate
- ITF = ITF entry
- PR = Protected ranking
- SR = Special ranking
- SE = Special exempt
- JE = Junior exempt
- JR = Junior Accelerator Programme entrant
- CO = College Accelerator Programme entrant
- NG = Next Gen Accelerator Program entrant
- w/o = Walkover
- r = Retired
- d = Defaulted

=== First qualifier ===
First round
1	(United States) Sandy Mayer	6	7
8	(Italy) Franco Bartoni	4	5
4	(United Kingdom) Colin McHugo	8	6
5	(Australia) Greg Perkins	6	3
2	(United States) Larry Parker	3	6	6
7	(Spain) José Guerrero	6	4	4
3	(Argentina) Ricardo Cano	7	8
6	(India) Jayakumar Royappa	5	6

Second round
(United States) Sandy Mayer	6	6
(United Kingdom) Colin McHugo	2	1
(United States) Larry Parker	6	6
(Argentina) Ricardo Cano	4	1

Qualifying competition
(United States) Sandy Mayer	8	6	8
(United States) Larry Parker	6	3	6

=== Second qualifier ===
First round
1	(Italy) Pietro Marzano	6	8
8	(United States) Gery Groslimond	3	6
4	(United Kingdom) Lindsay Murphy	6	6
5	(Brazil) Eulicio Silva	2	2
2	(South Africa) André van der Merwe	9	3	8
7	(France) Thierry Bernasconi	8	6	6
3	(Australia) Cliff Letcher	6	7
6	(Bolivia) Eduardo Gorostiaga	4	5

Second round
(Italy) Pietro Marzano	6	6
(United Kingdom) Lindsay Murphy	2	3
(South Africa) André van der Merwe	6	6
(Australia) Cliff Letcher	2	3

Qualifying competition
(Italy) Pietro Marzano	8	9	6
(South Africa) André van der Merwe	6	8	3

=== Third qualifier ===
First round
1	(United States) Dick Knight	6	6
8	(Pakistan) Saeed Meer	4	3
4	(New Zealand) Russell Simpson	4	6	6
5	(United States) M Maream	6	3	4
2	(Spain) Juan Herrera	6	6
7	(United Kingdom) John Ward	2	3
3	(France) Pierre Joly	6	6
6	(United Kingdom) Keith Glass	3	2

Second round
(United States) Dick Knight	6	6
(New Zealand) Russell Simpson	2	2
(Spain) Juan Herrera	7	9	6
(France) Pierre Joly	9	8	4

Qualifying competition
(United States) Dick Knight	6	9	4	6
(Spain) Juan Herrera	2	8	6	2

=== Fourth qualifier ===
First round
1	(Australia) William Durham	6	6
8	(Sudan) Samir Farid	0	0
4	(Finland) George Berner	6	6
5	(Egypt) Aly El Dawoudi	3	3
2	(New Zealand) Robert Clarke	8	6
7	(United States) Stanley Pasarell	6	3
3	(United States) Steven Turner	6	7
6	(Japan) Kiyoshi Tanabe	1	5

Second round
(Australia) William Durham	2	6	7
(Finland) George Berner	6	4	5
(New Zealand) Robert Clarke	8	6
(United States) Steven Turner	6	1

Qualifying competition
(Australia) William Durham	6	6	6
(New Zealand) Robert Clarke	0	2	4

=== Fifth qualifier ===
First round
1	(United States) Paul Gerken	6	6
8	(New Zealand) Ross McGhie	4	4
4	(Australia) Tony Dawson	6	6
5	(United Kingdom) Graeme Notman	2	0
2	(South Africa) John Yuill	4	9	6
7	(Brazil) Carlos Kirmayr	6	8	4
3	(Australia) Paul Kronk	6	6
6	(Israel) Yair Wertheimer	3	1

Second round
(United States) Paul Gerken	6	6
(Australia) Tony Dawson	4	0
(South Africa) John Yuill	9	6
(Australia) Paul Kronk	8	2

Qualifying competition
(United States) Paul Gerken	7	3	6	6
(South Africa) John Yuill	5	6	3	2

=== Sixth qualifier ===
First round
1	(United States) Dan Bleckinger	6	6
8	(South Africa) Abe Segal	3	4
4	(United States) Lenny Schloss	8	9
5	(South Africa) Frank McDonald	6	8
2	(Australia) Ernie Ewert	6	6
7	(France) Éric Derasse	3	2
3	(Mexico) Raul Ramírez	6	6
6	(United Kingdom) Geoff Newton	4	4

Second round
(United States) Dan Bleckinger	9	3	7
(United States) Lenny Schloss	7	6	5
(Australia) Ernie Ewert	9	6
(Mexico) Raul Ramírez	7	2

Qualifying competition
(United States) Dan Bleckinger	6	9	4	6
(Australia) Ernie Ewert	4	8	6	3

=== Seventh qualifier ===
First round
1	(United States) Eugene Scott	6	6
8	(Italy) Vincenzo Franchitti	4	3
4	(South Africa) Peter Tudhope	7	6
5	(South Africa) Colin D Shaw	5	2
2	(Poland) Wojciech Fibak	4	6
7	(United Kingdom) Robin Drysdale	6	1^{r}
3	(United States) Norman Holmes	4	6	6
6	(Poland) Jacek Niedźwiedzki	6	2	3

Second round
(United States) Eugene Scott	6	8	6
(South Africa) Peter Tudhope	2	9	3
(Poland) Wojciech Fibak	6	3	6
(United States) Norman Holmes	2	6	2

Qualifying competition
(United States) Eugene Scott	6	8	6
(Poland) Wojciech Fibak	4	6	4

=== Eighth qualifier ===
First round
1	(United States) Dick R. Bohrnstedt	6	5	6
8	(Finland) Pekka Saila	3	7	4
4	(United Kingdom) Richard Lewis	4	6	6
5	(Australia) Keith Hancock	6	3	1
2	(Spain) José Moreno	6	6
7	(Australia) Michael Phillips	1	4
3	(Australia) Jim Moore	6	6
6	(United Kingdom) John Williams	2	3

Second round
(United States) Dick R. Bohrnstedt	6	3	6
(United Kingdom) Richard Lewis	3	6	4
(Spain) José Moreno	6	6
(Australia) Jim Moore	4	4

Qualifying competition
(United States) Dick R. Bohrnstedt	3	6	6	3	6
(Spain) José Moreno	6	3	2	6	4

=== Ninth qualifier ===
First round
1	(Australia) Alvin Gardiner	6	7
8	(Portugal) Alfredo Vaz-Pinto	1	5
4	(South Africa) Dennis Matthews	6	6
5	(Greece) Nicolas Kelaidis	3	3
2	(France) Jean-François Caujolle	3	8	7
7	(United States) Dick Dell	6	6	5
3	(Argentina) Lito Álvarez	6	6
6	(United Kingdom) Mike Collins	1	1

Second round
(Australia) Alvin Gardiner	6	7
(South Africa) Dennis Matthews	1	5
(France) Jean-François Caujolle	6	4	7
(Argentina) Lito Álvarez	4	6	5

Qualifying competition
(Australia) Alvin Gardiner	6	6	6
(France) Jean-François Caujolle	3	1	3

=== Tenth qualifier ===
First round
1	(United States) Sherwood Stewart	6	7	6
8	(South Africa) Mickey Styles	2	9	3
4	(United Kingdom) Richard Leslie	6	7
5	(United Kingdom) David Segal	1	5
2	(United States) Vitas Gerulaitis	8	6
7	(United Kingdom) Ashley Compton-Dando	6	0
3	(Pakistan) Munawar Iqbal	6	6
6	(Australia) Rod Frawley	4	2

Second round
(United States) Sherwood Stewart	6	7
(United Kingdom) Richard Leslie	2	5
(United States) Vitas Gerulaitis	1	6	6
(Pakistan) Munawar Iqbal	6	3	4

Qualifying competition
(United States) Sherwood Stewart	6	8	6
(United States) Vitas Gerulaitis	4	6	1

=== Eleventh qualifier ===
First round
1	(United States) Butch Seewagen	6	7
8	(Jamaica) Richard Russell	2	5
4	(United Kingdom) John Lloyd	6	6
5	(Greece) Periclis Gavrilidis	4	2
2	(United States) Steve Faulk	6	8
7	(Japan) Kenichi Hirai	2	6
3	(Spain) José Higueras	6	7
6	(Australia) Graeme Thomson	2	5

Second round
(United States) Butch Seewagen	5	6	6
(United Kingdom) John Lloyd	7	0	4
(United States) Steve Faulk	6	6
(Spain) José Higueras	3	1

Qualifying competition
(United States) Butch Seewagen	7	6	8
(United States) Steve Faulk	5	2	6

=== Twelfth qualifier ===
First round
1	(United States) Jeff Austin	6	6
8	(France) Éric Loliée	2	4
4	(Ecuador) Eduardo Zuleta	6	5	6
5	(United Kingdom) Peter Curtis	2	7	2
2	(United States) Steve Siegel	6	6
7	(United States) Mark Shires	4	4
3	(Canada) Donald McCormick	6	4	6
6	(United States) Gene Malin	4	6	4

Second round
(United States) Jeff Austin	6	6
(Ecuador) Eduardo Zuleta	4	2
(United States) Steve Siegel	6	6
(Canada) Donald McCormick	2	4

Qualifying competition
(United States) Jeff Austin	4	6	6	6
(United States) Steve Siegel	6	4	4	3

=== Thirteenth qualifier ===
First round
1	(Argentina) Tito Vázquez	6	6
8	(United States) Mike Machette	4	2
4	(South Africa) Rayno Seegers	6	6
5	(Argentina) A Rosetti	4	2
2	(United States) William Brown	6	6
7	(New Zealand) Don Turner	4	1
3	(India) Bidyut Goswami	7	4	6
6	(Australia) Alan Haswell	5	6	2

Second round
(Argentina) Tito Vázquez	4	6	6
(South Africa) Rayno Seegers	6	2	0
(United States) William Brown	6	6
(India) Bidyut Goswami	1	3

Qualifying competition
(Argentina) Tito Vázquez	9	6	7	9
(United States) William Brown	7	2	9	8

=== Fourteenth qualifier ===
First round
1	(United States) Robert Stock	6	6
8	(France) François Battegay	3	4
4	(United States) Barratt Stetson	9	1	7
5	(South Africa) Anthony Fawcett	8	6	5
2	(Socialist Federal Republic of Yugoslavia) Zlatko Ivančić	7	3	6
7	(Brazil) Roberto Marcher	5	6	2
3	(United Kingdom) Clay Iles	6	8	6
6	(United States) Harry Fritz	4	9	2

Second round
(United States) Robert Stock	6	6
(United States) Barratt Stetson	4	1
(Socialist Federal Republic of Yugoslavia) Zlatko Ivančić	8	6
(United Kingdom) Clay Iles	6	1

Qualifying competition
(United States) Robert Stock	7	6	6
(Socialist Federal Republic of Yugoslavia) Zlatko Ivančić	5	4	3

=== Fifteenth qualifier ===
First round
1	(United States) Mike Estep	9	6
8	(Bolivia) Ramiro Benavides	8	3
4	(South Africa) Byron Bertram	6	4	6
5	(Brazil) Luis-Felipe Tavares	2	6	3
2	(Australia) John James	6	6
7	(United States) Kv Lynn	2	3
3	(United Kingdom) John Edmund	6	9
6	(United Kingdom) Phil Siviter	3	8

Second round
(United States) Mike Estep	3	6	6
(South Africa) Byron Bertram	6	2	1
(Australia) John James	3	6	6
(United Kingdom) John Edmund	6	3	4

Qualifying competition
(United States) Mike Estep	3	4	6	6	6
(Australia) John James	6	6	2	2	1

=== Sixteenth qualifier ===
First round
1	(United Kingdom) Paul Hutchins	6	6
8	(India) Chiradip Mukerjea	4	4
4	(Argentina) Julián Ganzábal	5	7	6
5	(Italy) Piero Toci	7	5	3
2	(Australia) Harold Turnbull	9	6
7	(United States) Doug Crawford	8	4
3	(South Africa) William Freer	6	6	8
6	(Australia) Bob Rheinberger	4	8	6

Second round
(United Kingdom) Paul Hutchins	6	9
(Argentina) Julián Ganzábal	2	8
(Australia) Harold Turnbull	8	6
(South Africa) William Freer	6	4

Qualifying competition
(United Kingdom) Paul Hutchins	6	6	6
(Australia) Harold Turnbull	3	3	3
