= 1974 Australian Open – Men's doubles =

Men's doubles
- 1974 Australian Open

Final
- Champions: (Australia) Ross Case (Australia) Geoff Masters
- Runners-up: (Australia) Syd Ball (Australia) Bob Giltinan
- Score: 6–7, 6–3, 6–4

Details
- Draw: 35
- Seeds: 8

Events
Singles	men	women		boys	girls
Doubles	men	women	mixed	boys	girls
WC Singles	men	women	quad
WC Doubles	men	women	quad
Legends	men	women	mixed
- Australian Open

Mal Anderson and John Newcombe were the defending champions.

== Seeds ==
1. (Australia) John Newcombe / (Australia) Tony Roche (semifinals)
2. (Australia) Ross Case / (Australia) Geoff Masters (champion)
3. (Australia) John Alexander / (Australia) Allan Stone (quarterfinals)
4. (Sweden) Björn Borg / (United States) Jimmy Connors (third round)
5. (Australia) Phil Dent / (Australia) Colin Dibley (quarterfinals)
6. (Australia) Syd Ball / (Australia) Bob Giltinan (final)
7. (West Germany) Karl Meiler / (New Zealand) Onny Parun (third round)
8. (Australia) Bob Carmichael / (Australia) Ray Ruffels (quarterfinals)

== Draw ==
Key

- Q = Qualifier
- WC = Wild card
- LL = Lucky loser
- Alt = Alternate
- ITF = ITF entry
- PR = Protected ranking
- SR = Special ranking
- SE = Special exempt
- JE = Junior exempt
- JR = Junior Accelerator Programme entrant
- CO = College Accelerator Programme entrant
- NG = Next Gen Accelerator Program entrant
- w/o = Walkover
- r = Retired
- d = Defaulted

=== Finals ===
Quarterfinals
1	(Australia) John Newcombe (Australia) Tony Roche	6	7
8	(Australia) Bob Carmichael (Australia) Ray Ruffels	3	6
6	(Australia) Syd Ball (Australia) Bob Giltinan	6	7
3	(Australia) John Alexander (Australia) Allan Stone	3	5
(Australia) Ian Fletcher (Australia) Kim Warwick	7	7
5	(Australia) Phil Dent (Australia) Colin Dibley	6	6
(Australia) Ray Keldie (Australia) Barry Phillips-Moore	5	6
2	(Australia) Ross Case (Australia) Geoff Masters	7	7

Semifinals
1	(Australia) John Newcombe (Australia) Tony Roche	4	7	10
6	(Australia) Syd Ball (Australia) Bob Giltinan	6	5	12
(Australia) Ian Fletcher (Australia) Kim Warwick	4	6	4
2	(Australia) Ross Case (Australia) Geoff Masters	6	2	6

Final
6	(Australia) Syd Ball (Australia) Bob Giltinan	7	3	4
2	(Australia) Ross Case (Australia) Geoff Masters	6	6	6

=== Top half ===
==== Top half 1 ====
First round

Second round
1	(Australia) J Newcombe (Australia) T Roche	6	6
(Australia) V Eke (Australia) P McNamee	4	4
(France) T Bernasconi (France) J-L Haillet	7	7
(Australia) K Hancock (Australia) C Mason	6	6
(Australia) J Bartlett (United Kingdom) J Paish	2	6	6
(France) J-P Meyer (France) W N'Godrella	6	3	4
(Australia) E Ewert (Australia) M Rose	2	2
8	(Australia) B Carmichael (Australia) R Ruffels	6	6

Third round
1	(Australia) J Newcombe (Australia) T Roche	7	6
(France) T Bernasconi (France) J-L Haillet	5	4
(Australia) J Bartlett (United Kingdom) J Paish	6	3
8	(Australia) B Carmichael (Australia) R Ruffels	7	6

Quarterfinals
1	(Australia) J Newcombe (Australia) T Roche	6	7
8	(Australia) B Carmichael (Australia) R Ruffels	3	6

==== Top half 2 ====
First round
(France) D Naegelen (West Germany) U Pinner	6	6
(Australia) M Pettman (Australia) A Rae	3	3
(Netherlands) J Hordijk (India) J Singh	2	2
(Australia) J James (Australia) M Phillips	6	6

Second round
6	(Australia) S Ball (Australia) B Giltinan	6	6
(France) J-F Caujolle (United States) L Parker	1	4
(Australia) W Coghlan (Australia) C Stubs	6	7
(United States) G Hardie (Australia) A Kourim	3	6
(France) D Naegelen (West Germany) U Pinner	2	3
(Australia) J James (Australia) M Phillips	6	6
(Australia) J Cooper (Australia) N Fraser	6	2
3	(Australia) J Alexander (Australia) A Stone	7	6

Third round
6	(Australia) S Ball (Australia) B Giltinan	6	6
(Australia) W Coghlan (Australia) C Stubs	4	4
(Australia) J James (Australia) M Phillips	3	2
3	(Australia) J Alexander (Australia) A Stone	6	6

Quarterfinals
6	(Australia) S Ball (Australia) B Giltinan	6	7
3	(Australia) J Alexander (Australia) A Stone	3	5

=== Bottom half ===
==== Bottom half 1 ====
First round
(Australia) I Fletcher (Australia) K Warwick	6	6
(United States) W Brown (Czechoslovakia) M Holeček	4	3

Second round
4	(Sweden) B Borg (United States) J Connors	6	6
(Japan) K Hirai (Japan) K Tanabe	3	2
(Australia) I Fletcher (Australia) K Warwick	6	6	6
(Australia) D Crealy (Czechoslovakia) V Zednik	4	7	2
(Australia) J Eastburn (Australia) F Sedgman	4	4
(Switzerland) F Blatter (Switzerland) P Kanderal	6	6
(United Kingdom) J Feaver (Australia) G Thomson	3	6
5	(Australia) P Dent (Australia) C Dibley	6	7

Third round
4	(Sweden) B Borg (United States) J Connors	5	7	3
(Australia) I Fletcher (Australia) K Warwick	7	6	6
(Switzerland) F Blatter (Switzerland) P Kanderal	3	4
5	(Australia) P Dent (Australia) C Dibley	6	6

Quarterfinals
(Australia) I Fletcher (Australia) K Warwick	7	7
5	(Australia) P Dent (Australia) C Dibley	6	6

==== Bottom half 2 ====
First round

Second round
7	(West Germany) K Meiler (New Zealand) O Parun	6	6
(Australia) G Braun (Australia) J Trickey	3	4
(Australia) R Keldie (Australia) B Phillips-Moore	7	6
(Australia) R Casey (Australia) A Hammond	6	4
(United Kingdom) M Farrell (United Kingdom) J Lloyd	6	4
(Australia) A Gardiner (Australia) H Turnbull	7	6
(Australia) W Durham (Australia) C Letcher	6	5	3
2	(Australia) R Case (Australia) G Masters	4	7	6

Third round
7	(West Germany) K Meiler (New Zealand) O Parun	6	6
(Australia) R Keldie (Australia) B Phillips-Moore	7	7
(Australia) A Gardiner (Australia) H Turnbull	4	7	1
2	(Australia) R Case (Australia) G Masters	6	6	6

Quarterfinals
(Australia) R Keldie (Australia) B Phillips-Moore	5	6
2	(Australia) R Case (Australia) G Masters	7	7
