= Håkan Zahr =

Swedish tennis player (1948–2015)

- Country (sports): Sweden
- Residence: Sweden
- Born: 16 April 1948; Sweden
- Died: 4 October 2015 (aged 67); Halmstad, Sweden
- Plays: Right-handed

Singles
- Career record: 4–14
- Career titles: 0

Grand Slam singles results
- Australian Open: 1R (1966)
- French Open: 1R (1970)
- US Open: 1R (1970)

Doubles
- Career record: 2–7
- Career titles: 0

Grand Slam doubles results
- US Open: 1R (1970)

Håkan Zahr (16 April 1948 – 4 October 2015) was a Swedish tennis player.

== Tennis career ==
Zahr won the Swedish National Championships in 1969 and 1970 and represented Sweden in one Davis Cup tie, the 1971 first round Europe Zone A tie against France.

Zahr participated in three Grand Slam events, the 1966 Australian Open and the French Open and US Open in 1970.

== See also ==
- List of Sweden Davis Cup team representatives
