= Mohammed Arif Ilahi =

Pakistani tennis player

Arif Ilahi
- Full name: Mohammed Arif Ilahi
- Country (sports): Pakistan
- Born: July 1, 1935
- Died: Houston, Texas

Singles
- Career record: 40–16

Grand Slam singles results
- US Open: 2R (1970)

Doubles
- Career record: 0–3

Grand Slam doubles results
- French Open: 2R (1971)
- US Open: 1R (1970, 1971)

Grand Slam mixed doubles results
- US Open: 2R (1970, 1971)

Mohammed Arif Ilahi MD, MRCP, (born July 1, 1935) was a Pakistani physician and former professional tennis player. He was the son of Col. Dr. Ilahi Bakhsh MD, MRCP who was Muhammad Ali Jinnah's personal physician.

== Sports career ==
While competing on the international circuit, Ilahi played one Davis Cup tie for Pakistan, when they played India in Patna in 1970. He featured in the final reverse singles rubber against Vijay Amritraj, which was abandoned at 5–5 in the fourth set, with the Indian leading two sets to one.

Ilahi appeared in the main draw of the 1970 US Open and made it to the second round, by beating Steve Krulevitz in five sets. In 1971 he participated in the qualifying draws for the French Open and Wimbledon Championships.

== Medical career ==
Ilahi achieved his MBBS degree from King Edward Medical College, Lahore. Later he became an assistant professor of medicine at his alma mater. Later he settled and practiced as a physician in Baytown, Texas.
