= Jean-Pierre Courcol =

French tennis player and business executive

- Country (sports): France
- Born: 18 March 1944 (age 81) Montgeron, France

Singles
- Career record: 12–18

Grand Slam singles results
- French Open: 2R (1968, 1969, 1971)
- Wimbledon: 2R (1969)
- US Open: 2R (1969)

Doubles
- Career record: 6–10

Grand Slam doubles results
- French Open: 3R (1969, 1970)
- Wimbledon: 1R (1968, 1969)
- US Open: 1R (1969)

Jean-Pierre Courcol (born 18 March 1944) is a French business executive and a former professional tennis player.

Courcol was the director of L'Équipe from 1984 to 1993 and served as managing director of Air Inter in the late 1990s.

As a tennis player, Courcol won the South of France Championships in Nice in 1967 and was the last men's champion of the French Covered Court Championships in 1969. He reached the second round of the French Open on three occasions, which includes the 1969 tournament when he lost a five set match to Arthur Ashe.

His son Daniel Courcol also competed on the professional tennis tour.
