= Martin Carlstein =

Swedish tennis player

- Country (sports): Sweden
- Born: 20 May 1942
- Died: 17 July 2018 (aged 76); Tällberg, Sweden
- Plays: Right-handed

Singles
- Career record: 0–3
- Career titles: 0

Grand Slam singles results
- Wimbledon: Q2 (1969)
- US Open: 1R (1969)

Doubles
- Career record: 0–3
- Career titles: 0

Grand Slam doubles results
- Wimbledon: 1R (1969)
- US Open: 2R (1969)

Martin Carlstein (20 May 1942 – 17 July 2018) was a tennis player from Sweden.

== Career ==
Carlstein played in one match for Sweden in the Davis Cup competition, being the 1969 Europe Zone first-round tie against Finland. He partnered with Ove Bengtson in the doubles, to beat George Berner and Heikki Hedman in straight sets. He also captained the Swedish Davis Cup team in 1977 and 1978.

Carlstein participated in the singles and doubles competition at the 1969 US Open. In the singles he lost in the first round to Robert McKinley and in the doubles, with partner Ove Bengtson, lost in the second round.

== See also ==
- List of Sweden Davis Cup team representatives
