= 1970 US Open – Mixed doubles =

Mixed doubles
- 1970 US Open

Final
- Champions: (United States) Marty Riessen (Australia) Margaret Court
- Runners-up: (South Africa) Frew McMillan (Australia) Judy Dalton
- Score: 6–4, 6–4

Details
- Draw: 34
- Seeds: 4

Events
| Singles | men | women | | boys | girls |
| Doubles | men | women | mixed | boys | girls |
| WC Singles | men | women | quad |
| WC Doubles | men | women | quad |
| Legends | men | women | mixed |
| ← 1969 · | US Open | · 1971 → |

Marty Riessen and Margaret Court were the defending champions and successfully defended their title, defeating Frew McMillan and Judy Dalton 6–4, 6–4 in the final.

This was the first edition to feature a tie-break. It was used a sudden-death tie-break in all sets, winning the first to reach 5 points.

== Seeds ==
1. (United States) Marty Riessen / (Australia) Margaret Court (champions)
2. (Soviet Union) Alex Metreveli / (Soviet Union) Olga Morozova (second round)
3. (South Africa) Frew McMillan / (Australia) Judy Dalton (final)
4. (United States) Dennis Ralston / (France) Françoise Dürr (semifinals)

== Draw ==
=== Key ===
- Q = Qualifier
- WC = Wild card
- LL = Lucky loser
- Alt = Alternate
- SE = Special exempt
- PR = Protected ranking
- ITF = ITF entry
- JE = Junior exempt
- w/o = Walkover
- r = Retired
- d = Defaulted
- SR = Special ranking

=== Finals ===
Quarterfinals
1 | (United States) Marty Riessen (Australia) Margaret Court | 7 | 3 | 6
(United States) Tom Gorman (United States) Denise Carter | 5 | 6 | 2
4 | (United States) Dennis Ralston (France) Françoise Dürr | 6 | 6
(Australia) Bob Carmichael (France) Gail Chanfreau | 3 | 1
(United States) Cliff Richey (United States) Nancy Richey | 1 | 3
3 | (South Africa) Frew McMillan (Australia) Judy Dalton | 6 | 6
(Australia) Owen Davidson (United States) Rosie Casals | 6 | 6
(United Kingdom) Roger Taylor (United Kingdom) Nell Truman | 7 | 7

Semifinals
1 | (United States) Marty Riessen (Australia) Margaret Court | 6 | 6 | 6
4 | (United States) Dennis Ralston (France) Françoise Dürr | 3 | 7 | 3
3 | (South Africa) Frew McMillan (Australia) Judy Dalton | 7 | 6
(United Kingdom) Roger Taylor (United Kingdom) Nell Truman | 5 | 3

Final
1 | (United States) Marty Riessen (Australia) Margaret Court | 6 | 6
3 | (South Africa) Frew McMillan (Australia) Judy Dalton | 4 | 4

=== Top half ===
==== Section 1 ====
First round

Second round
1 | (United States) M Riessen (Australia) M Court | 7 | 6
(Australia) B Howe (United States) D Hard | 6 | 0
(United States) L Miller (United States) M-A Curtis | 6 | 6
(United States) G Taylor (United States) B-A Hansen | 3 | 4
(Ecuador) P Guzmán (South Africa) E Emmanuel | 5 | 6 | 6
(Sweden) O Bengtson (Sweden) C Sandberg | 7 | 3 | 4
(United States) D Dell (Sweden) I Bentzer | 2 | 5
(United States) T Gorman (United States) D Carter | 6 | 7

Third round
1 | (United States) M Riessen (Australia) M Court | 6 | 6
(United States) L Miller (United States) M-A Curtis | 2 | 2
(Ecuador) P Guzmán (South Africa) E Emmanuel | 4 | 1
(United States) T Gorman (United States) D Carter | 6 | 6

Quarterfinals
1 | (United States) M Riessen (Australia) M Court | 7 | 3 | 6
(United States) T Gorman (United States) D Carter | 5 | 6 | 2

==== Section 2 ====
First round
(United States) K Stuart (Australia) K Harris | 2 | 3
(Australia) D Crealy (Australia) K Melville | 6 | 6

Second round
4 | (United States) D Ralston (France) F Dürr | 6 | 3 | 7
(Chile) P Cornejo (United States) P Teeguarden | 3 | 6 | 5
(United States) S Ross (United States) P Bartkowicz | 4 | 4
(United States) E Scott (United States) C Martinez | 6 | 6
(Australia) B Carmichael (France) G Chanfreau | 6 | 6
(United States) B Salembier (United States) P Hogan | 3 | 0
(Australia) R Ruffels (United Kingdom) V Wade | 3 | 7 | 6
(Australia) D Crealy (Australia) K Melville | 6 | 6 | 7

Third round
4 | (United States) D Ralston (France) F Dürr | 6 | 7
(United States) E Scott (United States) C Martinez | 2 | 6
(Australia) B Carmichael (France) G Chanfreau | w/o
(Australia) D Crealy (Australia) K Melville

Quarterfinals
4 | (United States) D Ralston (France) F Dürr | 6 | 6
(Australia) B Carmichael (France) G Chanfreau | 3 | 1

=== Bottom half ===
==== Section 3 ====
First round
(France) J-B Chanfreau (Australia) L Hunt | 6 | 6
(Soviet Union) V Korotkov (Soviet Union) M Kroschina | 2 | 3

Second round
(France) J-B Chanfreau (Australia) L Hunt | 4 | 6 | 5
(Jamaica) R Russell (United Kingdom) S Holdsworth | 6 | 3 | 7
(United States) C Richey (United States) N Richey | 6 | 6
(United States) P Fishbach (United States) M Aschner | 2 | 4
(Australia) A Stone (Rhodesia) P Walkden | 6 | 7
(United States) A Olmedo (United States) K Kemmer | 2 | 6
(United States) M Machette (United States) S Walsh | 6 | 1 | 1
3 | (South Africa) F McMillan (Australia) J Dalton | 4 | 6 | 6

Third round
(Jamaica) R Russell (United Kingdom) S Holdsworth
(United States) C Richey (United States) N Richey | w/o
(Australia) A Stone (Rhodesia) P Walkden | 3 | 5
3 | (South Africa) F McMillan (Australia) J Dalton | 6 | 7

Quarterfinals
(United States) C Richey (United States) N Richey | 1 | 3
3 | (South Africa) F McMillan (Australia) J Dalton | 6 | 6

==== Section 4 ====
First round

Second round
(Australia) F Stolle (Australia) H Gourlay | 4 | 1
(New Zealand) B Fairlie (United States) K Pigeon | 6 | 6
(Australia) O Davidson (United States) R Casals | 6 | 6
(Pakistan) MA Ilahi (United States) P Stewart | 0 | 1
(Chile) J Fillol (United States) K Harter | 7 | 6
(United Kingdom) P Curtis (United States) S Johnson | 6 | 4
(United Kingdom) R Taylor (United Kingdom) N Truman | 7 | 6
2 | (Soviet Union) A Metreveli (Soviet Union) O Morozova | 5 | 2

Third round
(New Zealand) B Fairlie (United States) K Pigeon | 2 | 6
(Australia) O Davidson (United States) R Casals | 6 | 7
(Chile) J Fillol (United States) K Harter | 5 | 4
(United Kingdom) R Taylor (United Kingdom) N Truman | 7 | 6

Quarterfinals
(Australia) O Davidson (United States) R Casals | 6 | 6
(United Kingdom) R Taylor (United Kingdom) N Truman | 7 | 7
