= Bob Alloo =

American tennis player

- Country (sports): United States
- Born: May 7, 1949 (age 77)

Singles
- Career record: 1–8

Grand Slam singles results
- US Open: 1R (1970)

Doubles
- Career record: 1–4

Grand Slam doubles results
- US Open: 2R (1970)

Bob Alloo (born May 7, 1949) is an American former professional tennis player.

Alloo, originally from the Pacific coast, was a two-time Kansas AA state champion while at Shawnee Mission East High School. The family moved to Kansas in the mid-1960s when his father, a General Motors Buick manager, was transferred to Kansas City. He had an elder brother Chuck who also played tennis and was on the varsity team at Stanford.

A collegiate player for UC Berkeley, Alloo achieved All-American honors in 1969 and 1970.

Alloo featured in the singles main draw of the 1970 US Open and was beaten in the first round by ex-Berkeley player Jim McManus. He also appeared twice in the US Open men's doubles main draw.
