= Lenny Schloss =

American tennis player (born 1945)

- Country (sports): United States
- Born: 1945 (age 80–81) Florida, United States

Singles
- Career record: 17–36

Grand Slam singles results
- Australian Open: 2R (1970)
- French Open: Q1 (1972)
- Wimbledon: Q2 (1968, 1972)
- US Open: 2R (1966)

Lenny Schloss (born 1945) is an American former professional tennis player.

== College tennis ==
Born in Florida, Schloss was a collegiate player for the University of Tennessee from 1964 to 1967, during which he won two SEC singles title and as a senior was the program's first All-American.

== Professional tour ==
Schloss and partner Tom Mozur took part in one of the longest doubles matches on record at the Hall of Fame Championships in Newport, Rhode Island in 1967. They were beaten 6–3, 47–49, 20–22 by Dick Dell and Dick Leach, in a match which lasted for 6 hours and 10 minutes, and across two days. While competing on the professional tour, Schloss registered upset wins over Clark Graebner and Charlie Pasarell.
