= 1971 Pepsi-Cola Masters – Singles =

Singles
- 1971 Pepsi-Cola Masters

Final
- Champion: (Romania) Ilie Năstase
- Runner-up: (United States) Stan Smith
- Score: 5–7, 7–6, 6–3

Details
- Draw: 7-player round robin

Events
Singles
- ATP Finals

Ilie Năstase won the singles title at the 1971 Pepsi-Cola Masters. He went undefeated in all five of his matches, and did not play Pierre Barthès because he had already clinched the title.

Stan Smith was the defending champion, but lost matches in the round robin to Năstase and Jan Kodeš.

== Round robin ==
Key

- Q = Qualifier
- WC = Wild card
- LL = Lucky loser
- Alt = Alternate
- ITF = ITF entry
- PR = Protected ranking
- SR = Special ranking
- SE = Special exempt
- JE = Junior exempt
- JR = Junior Accelerator Programme entrant
- CO = College Accelerator Programme entrant
- NG = Next Gen Accelerator Program entrant
- w/o = Walkover
- r = Retired
- d = Defaulted

	(Romania) Năstase	(United States) Richey	(France) Barthès	(Czechoslovakia) Kodeš	(United States) Smith	(Socialist Federal Republic of Yugoslavia) Franulović	(United States) Graebner
(Romania) Ilie Năstase		5–7, 6–4, 8–6	–	5–7, 6–2, 6–2	5–7, 7–6, 6–3	3–6, 6–1, 6–2	6–3, 6–2
(United States) Cliff Richey	7–5, 4–6, 6–8		6–3, 6–3	6–2, 3–6, 6–3	6–4, 2–6, 7–9	6–4, 6–3	7–6, 4–6, 3–6
(France) Pierre Barthès	–	3–6, 3–6		6–3, 6–4	4–6, 7–6, 3–6	7–5, 4–6, 6–3	6–1, 7–6
(Czechoslovakia) Jan Kodeš	7–5, 2–6, 2–6	2–6, 6–3, 3–6	3–6, 4–6		6–4, 3–6, 6–4	6–4, 2–6, 7–5	7–6, 6–4
(United States) Stan Smith	7–5, 6–7, 3–6	4–6, 6–2, 9–7	6–4, 6–7, 6–3	4–6, 6–3, 4–6		6–4, 6–4	3–6, 7–5, 6–3
(Socialist Federal Republic of Yugoslavia) Željko Franulović	6–3, 1–6, 2–6	4–6, 3–6	5–7, 6–4, 3–6	4–6, 6–2, 5–7	4–6, 4–6		6–4, 7–6
(United States) Clark Graebner	3–6, 2–6	6–7, 6–4, 6–3	1–6, 6–7	6–7, 4–6	6–3, 5–7, 3–6	4–6, 6–7	

=== Standings ===
Player	RR W-L	Sets W-L	Games W-L	Standings
(Romania) Ilie Năstase	5–0	10–4	81–58	1
(United States) Stan Smith	4–2	10–6	95–84	2
(United States) Cliff Richey	3–3	9–7	85–80	3
(Czechoslovakia) Jan Kodeš	3–3	8–8	72–83	4
(France) Pierre Barthès	3–2	6–5	62–59	5
(Socialist Federal Republic of Yugoslavia) Željko Franulović	1–5	5–10	63–81	6
(United States) Clark Graebner	1–5	3–11	65–81	7

Standings are determined by: 1. number of wins; 2. number of matches; 3. number of sets won; 4. number of games won; 5. in two-players-ties, head-to-head records; 6. in three-players-ties, percentage of sets won, or of games won; 7. steering-committee decision.

== See also ==
- ATP World Tour Finals appearances
