= Larry Parker (tennis) =

American tennis player

- Country (sports): United States
- Born: October 23, 1949 (age 75); St. Louis, Missouri, U.S.

Singles
- Career record: 2–5
- Highest ranking: No. 264 (Sep 27, 1974)

Grand Slam singles results
- Australian Open: 1R (1974)
- French Open: Q1 (1974)
- Wimbledon: Q3 (1972)

Doubles
- Career record: 0–4

Grand Slam doubles results
- Australian Open: 2R (1974)
- Wimbledon: 1R (1976)
- US Open: 2R (1970)

Larry Parker (born October 23, 1949) is an American former professional tennis player.

A native of St. Louis, Parker was a collegiate tennis player for Cal Berkeley and made some appearances in professional tennis after graduating in 1971. He featured in the singles main draw of the 1974 Australian Open.

Parker and wife Chris run a bed and breakfast in Murphys, California.

His brother, Jimmy, was also a professional tennis player.
