= Roberto Marcher =

Brazilian tennis player

- Country (sports): Brazil
- Born: 1946; Porto Alegre, Brazil
- Died: 28 August 2023 (aged 77)

Singles
- Career record: 3–10

Grand Slam singles results
- Wimbledon: Q1 (1972)

Doubles
- Career record: 1–1

Grand Slam doubles results
- US Open: 2R (1970)

Roberto Marcher (1946 – 2023) was a Brazilian professional tennis player.

Born in Porto Alegre, Marcher was a collegiate tennis player for Florida State University during the late 1960s. He made two doubles main draw appearance at the US Open, including in 1970 when he and Thomaz Koch reached the second round. Following his time on tour he began working as a tennis promotor back in Brazil, where he was the first to organise a local tennis circuit. More recently he served as tournament director of the ATP Tour's Brasil Open.
