= Ken Stuart (tennis) =

American tennis player

- Country (sports): United States

Singles
- Career record: 1–19

Grand Slam singles results
- Australian Open: 2R (1970)
- Wimbledon: Q3 (1970)
- US Open: 1R (1970)

Doubles
- Career record: 0–5

Grand Slam doubles results
- US Open: 1R (1970)

Grand Slam mixed doubles results
- US Open: 1R (1970, 1977)

Ken Stuart is an American former professional tennis player.

Stuart played collegiate tennis for Long Beach State and won the NCAA College Division doubles championship as a senior in 1966 (with Fred Suessmann). He competed briefly on the professional tour and made the singles second round at the 1970 Australian Open. During the 1970s he was married to tennis player Betty Ann Grubb Stuart.

A Southern California Tennis Hall of Fame member, Stuart is the designer and owner of the Palisades Tennis Club.
