= Thierry Bernasconi =

French tennis player

- Country (sports): France
- Born: 3 September 1950 (age 74)
- Height: 188 cm (6 ft 2 in)

Singles
- Career record: 13–24

Grand Slam singles results
- Australian Open: 1R (1973, 1974)
- French Open: 1R (1974)
- Wimbledon: 1R (1973)
- US Open: Q2 (1969)

Doubles
- Career record: 8–15

Grand Slam doubles results
- Australian Open: 3R (1974)
- French Open: 2R (1968, 1971, 1974, 1976)
- Wimbledon: 1R (1974)
- US Open: 2R (1969)

Thierry Bernasconi (born 3 September 1950) is a French former professional tennis player.

Bernasconi, a French junior champion, possessed a powerful serve and featured in all four grand slam tournaments during his career. In 1972 he was a quarter-finalist at the Queensland Open, upsetting Davis Cup players Colin Dibley and Patrick Proisy en route. He also made the quarter-finals at Manchester in 1973.
