= Clark Graebner =

American tennis player

- Country (sports): United States
- Residence: New York City
- Born: November 4, 1943 (age 82) Cleveland, Ohio, US
- Height: 6 ft 2 in (1.88 m)
- Turned pro: 1968 (amateur from 1960)
- Retired: 1976
- Plays: Right-handed (one-handed backhand)

Singles
- Career record: 572–254 (69% win rate)
- Career titles: 29
- Highest ranking: No. 3 (1967)

Grand Slam singles results
- Australian Open: QF (1966)
- French Open: 4R (1966)
- Wimbledon: SF (1968)
- US Open: F (1967)

Other tournaments
- Tour Finals: RR (1971)

Doubles
- Career record: 141-68 (Open era)
- Career titles: 11

Clark Edward Graebner (born November 4, 1943) is an American former professional tennis player.

He was four times a world top ten ranked player each year from 1966 to 1969, reaching world No. 3 in 1967 and world No. 7 the following year. He was ranked eight times in the top ten U.S. players by the USTA, reaching U.S. No. 2 in 1968 behind Arthur Ashe, and U.S. No. 3 in 1966 and 1971.

Graebner won three U.S. national titles, the U.S. Clay Court in 1968, the U.S. Hard Court in 1969, and the U.S. Indoor in 1971. He was a member of the U.S. Davis Cup team which won the Davis Cup in five straight years from 1968 to 1972.

He won a Grand Slam doubles title at the 1966 French Championships at Roland Garros with doubles partner Dennis Ralston.

== Early life ==
Graebner was born in Cleveland, Ohio, the only child of Paul Graebner, a dentist, and his wife, the former Janice Clark. Paul had been a moderately successful youth player. Clark won the state high-school tennis championship three times. He graduated from Northwestern University, where he joined the Delta Upsilon fraternity.

In 1964 he married rising American tennis player Carole Caldwell. They had two children, a daughter, Cameron, and a son, Clark. The couple separated in 1974 and eventually divorced. In 1975, Graebner married Patti Morgan. Caldwell died of cancer in New York City on November 19, 2008.

== Tennis career ==
=== 1965 ===
Graebner won his first important international tournament in December 1965 at the Victorian Championships at Melbourne's Kooyong Stadium. He defeated Ray Ruffels, Tony Roche in a close five set match, Herb Fitzgibbon, Fred Stolle, and Roy Emerson in a five set final.

=== 1966 ===
Graebner lost to John Newcombe in the quarterfinal of the Australian Open. He returned the favour by defeating Newcombe in the third round at the French Championships at Roland Garros that season. He won the men's doubles title at the French Championships, with his doubles partner Dennis Ralston, defeating the Rumanian doubles team of Tiriac/Năstase in the final. Graebner won the Pennsylvania Lawn Tennis Championships at the Merion Cricket Club defeating Charlie Pasarell in the semifinal and Stan Smith in the final. At the U.S. Championships at Forest Hills, New York he reached the quarterfinals where he was defeated by Stolle, who would win the title that year.

Graebner was ranked world No. 9 for 1966 by McCauley. He was ranked the No. 3 U.S. player for that year by the USTA.

=== 1967 ===
Graebner won the Buffalo Indoor Tennis Championships in February defeating Marty Riessen in a marathon final. Graebner would also win this same event in 1968 (over Riessen again in the final), in 1969 (over Mark Cox in the final) and in 1970 (over Bob Lutz in the final).

He lost to Newcombe, the champion that year, in the 4th round of the 1967 Wimbledon championships. In the 1967 United States Championship, the last time the event, today's U.S. Open, was open only to amateur players, Graebner was the top-seeded U.S. player at No. 7. He defeated the No. 2 seed Roy Emerson in a marathon quarterfinal, but lost in the final to Newcombe.

Graebner was ranked world No. 3 for 1967, which would be his highest world ranking, by the Martini and Rossi panel of tennis experts using a point system for tournament play. He was ranked the U.S. No. 4 by the USTA for that year.

=== 1968 ===
In 1968 he reached the final of the Queen's Club Championships in London, defeating Stolle, Emerson and Alex Metreveli, but the final was not played. Graebner then reached the semifinals in singles at the 1968 Wimbledon, defeating both Manuel Santana and Stolle, before losing a close match to Roche. He won the 1968 U.S. Men's Clay Court Championships in Milwaukee defeating Charlie Pasarell in the semifinal and Stan Smith in the final. At the inaugural US Open, he defeated Newcombe in the quarter-final, but lost the semifinal to Arthur Ashe, the eventual champion. John McPhee's book, Levels of the Game, is about a semifinal match played between Graebner and Ashe at the 1968 US Open at Forest Hills. Ashe won the match.

Graebner was ranked U.S. No. 2 by the USTA for 1968 and world No. 7 by Lance Tingay as well as by most other ranking authorities.

Graebner and Ashe led the U.S. Davis Cup team to victory in the 1968 Davis Cup, its first in five years. Graebner won both of his singles matches in the Challenge Round against Australia, defeating Bill Bowrey and Ruffels in five set matches. The Americans won four more titles in as many years.

=== 1969 ===
Graebner won seven tournaments in the 1969 season, beginning with the Richmond WCT Indoor in February, defeating Thomaz Koch (winner over both Ashe and Richey in the event) in the final. He won the New York Indoor in March, defeating Pasarell in the final. At Wimbledon in 1969, Graebner defeated Ilie Năstase and Andrés Gimeno before losing to Roche again in the quarterfinal, this time in a marathon five sets. He won the U.S. Hard Court Championships in Sacramento in June, defeating Erik van Dillen in a close five-set final. That same season, Graebner won the Southampton Invitational at Long Island on grass, defeating Bill Bowrey in the semifinal and Lutz in the final, both matches in three straight sets. At the U.S. Open that year, he retired in the third set against Roger Taylor in the second round.

Graebner was ranked world No. 10 for 1969 by the Daily Express. He was ranked the U.S. No. 4 player by the USTA ranking.

=== 1970 ===
He won the 1970 River Oaks International Tennis Tournament on clay in Houston, Texas, in April defeating Santana in the semifinal and Cliff Richey in a close five-set final. At Wimbledon, Graebner eliminated Năstase again in the fourth round, but lost in the quarterfinal to Taylor. At the U.S. Open, Graebner lost to Newcombe in the fourth round, although he had beaten Newcombe earlier in the season at the 1970 U.S. Pro Tennis Championships at Longwood. Graebner also reached the singles quarterfinals in Cincinnati in 1970, falling to eventual champion Ken Rosewall. Graebner was ranked the U.S. No. 4 player by the USTA for 1970.

=== 1971 ===
He won the U.S. National Indoor Championships in February 1971, his third U.S. national title, defeating Năstase in the semifinal and Richey in the final in tight five-set matches. Graebner survived two match points against him in the final with Richey serving, on one of those points returning an overhead finishing shot from Richey. At Wimbledon that year, Graebner lost in the third round to Rod Laver. During that same season Graebner won two ITF tournaments. In the Pennsylvania Lawn Tennis Championship at the Merion Cricket Club, he defeated Frank Froehling in a close semifinal and Dick Stockton in the final. At the South Orange Open on grass in South Orange, New Jersey, he narrowly won the semifinal over Onny Parun and won the final against Pierre Barthès. This was a rewarding victory for Graebner who had finished as runner-up at South Orange in 1964 (to Ashe), in 1966 (to Roche), in 1967 (to Riessen), in 1968 (to Pasarell), and in 1969 (to Smith). At the U.S. Open, he advanced to the quarterfinals where he lost to Tom Okker. Graebner was ranked the U.S. No. 3 player by the USTA for 1971.

=== 1972 ===
In the 1972 Rothmans International Tennis Tournament at the Royal Albert Hall in London, England, Graebner defeated Năstase in the semifinal, but lost the final to Richey. Graebner and Năstase had a confrontation about court manners during the first set of the semifinal. Graebner won the Long Island Indoor title in April defeating Roscoe Tanner in the final. At Wimbledon that year, Graebner lost his second round match to Nastase in four sets, Nastase proceeding to a classic Wimbledon final against Smith. In the U.S. Championships, Graebner defeated Adriano Panatta in the first round in four sets, but lost to Smith in the second round in four sets.

=== 1973 ===
Graebner won his final ITF tournament at the Des Moines Open International Indoor defeating Nicholas Kalogeropoulos in the final. He defeated the world No. 1 Năstase in the semifinal of the Charleston International ITF tournament in a close match after losing the first set. He then lost the final to Jürgen Fassbender. Graebner also defeated Năstase at Paramus, N.J.in the semifinal, but lost the final to Jimmy Connors. At the U.S. Championships Graebner lost in the first round to Geoff Masters.

=== 1974 ===
At the U.S. Championships at Forest Hills N.Y., Graebner won his first round match against Torben Ulrich and rallied from two sets to one down to defeat Antonio Muñoz in the second round in five sets. He lost in the third round to Ray Moore.

=== Doubles ===
Graebner's most significant doubles title was undoubtedly his Grand Slam victory of the men's doubles title at the 1966 French Championships, where he and Ralston beat Țiriac and Năstase in the final. Graebner won the 1969 and 1970 U.S. Men's Clay Court Doubles Championship (with William Bowrey and Ashe, respectively), and the 1963 doubles title at Cincinnati.

== Grand Slam tournament performance timeline ==
Key
W	F	SF	QF	#R	RR	Q#	DNQ	A	NH

(W) winner; (F) finalist; (SF) semifinalist; (QF) quarterfinalist; (#R) rounds 4, 3, 2, 1; (RR) round-robin stage; (Q#) qualification round; (DNQ) did not qualify; (A) absent; (NH) not held; (SR) strike rate (events won / competed); (W–L) win–loss record.

=== Singles ===
Tournament	1960	1961	1962	1963	1964	1965	1966	1967	1968	1969	1970	1971	1972	1973	1974	1975	SR
Australian Open	A	A	A	A	A	A	QF	A	A	A	A	A	A	A	A	A	0 / 1
French Open	A	A	A	A	A	A	4R	A	A	A	A	A	3R	A	A	A	0 / 2
Wimbledon	A	A	A	A	1R	2R	2R	4R	SF	QF	QF	3R	2R	A	1R	A	0 / 10
US Open	2R	2R	1R	2R	3R	3R	QF	F	SF	2R	4R	QF	3R	1R	3R	1R	0 / 16
Strike rate	0 / 1	0 / 1	0 / 1	0 / 1	0 / 2	0 / 2	0 / 4	0 / 2	0 / 2	0 / 2	0 / 2	0 / 2	0 / 3	0 / 1	0 / 2	0 / 1	0 / 29

== Career finals ==
=== Singles: 20 (12 wins / 8 losses) ===
Result	W/L	Date	Tournament	Surface	Opponent	Score
Win	1–0	1965	Melbourne, Australia	Grass	(Australia) Roy Emerson	8–6, 7–5, 2–6, 1–6, 6–1
Win	2–0	1966	Merion, US	Grass	(United States) Stan Smith	6–3, 6–4, 6–3
Loss	2–1	1967	U.S. National Championships, Forest Hills, N.Y.	Grass	(Australia) John Newcombe	4–6, 4–6, 6–8
Win	3–1	1968	U.S. Clay Court Championships, Milwaukee, US	Clay	(United States) Stan Smith	6–3, 7–5, 6–0
Win	4–1	1969	Richmond WCT, Richmond, US	Indoor	(Brazil) Thomaz Koch	6–3, 10–12, 9-7
Win	5–1	1969	New York City Indoor, New York City, US	Indoor	(United States) Charlie Pasarell	6–2, 6–2
Win	6–1	1969	U.S. Hard Court Championships, Sacramento, US	Hard	(United States) Erik Van Dillen	6–4, 3–6, 4–6, 6–0, 7-5
Win	7–1	1969	Southampton Invitation, Southampton, US	Grass	(United States) Bob Lutz	6–2, 6–2, 6–4
Win	8–1	1970	Houston, US	Clay	(United States) Cliff Richey	2–6, 6–3, 5–7, 6–3, 6-2
Loss	8–2	1971	New York City Indoor, US	Indoor	(Socialist Federal Republic of Yugoslavia) Željko Franulović	2–6, 7–5, 4–6
Win	9–2	1971	U.S. Indoor Championships, Salisbury, US	Indoor (i)	(United States) Cliff Richey	2–6, 7–6, 1–6, 7–6, 6–0
Loss	9–3	1971	Hampton, US	Hard (i)	(Romania) Ilie Năstase	5–7, 4–6, 6–7
Loss	9–4	1971	Houston, US	Clay	(United States) Cliff Richey	1–6, 2–6, 2–6
Win	10–4	1971	Merion, US	Hard	(United States) Dick Stockton	6–2, 6–4, 6–7, 7–5
Win	11–4	1971	South Orange, US	Grass	(France) Pierre Barthès	6–3, 6–4, 6–4
Loss	11–5	1972	Royal Albert Hall Indoor, England	Hard (i)	(United States) Cliff Richey	5–7, 7–6, 5–7, 0–6
Loss	11–6	1972	Jacksonville, US	Hard (i)	(United States) Jimmy Connors	5–7, 4–6
Win	12–6	1973	Des Moines, US	Hard (i)	(Greece) Nicholas Kalogeropoulos	7–5, 4–6, 6–4
Loss	12–7	1973	Paramus, New Jersey, US	Hard (i)	(United States) Jimmy Connors	1–6, 2–6
Loss	12–8	1974	Baltimore, US	Carpet	(United States) Sandy Mayer	2–6, 1–6

=== Doubles: 22 (11 wins / 11 losses) ===
Result	W/L	Date	Tournament	Surface	Partner	Opponents	Score
Win	1–0	1966	French Championships, Roland Garros	clay	(United States) Dennis Ralston	(Romania) Ilie Năstase (Romania) Ion Țiriac	6–3, 6–3, 6–0
Win	2–0	1969	U.S. National Clay Court Championships; Indianapolis, US	Clay	(Australia) Bill Bowrey	(Australia) Dick Crealy (Australia) Allan Stone	6–4, 4–6, 6–4
Win	3–0	1970	U.S. National Clay Court Championships Indianapolis, US	Clay	(United States) Arthur Ashe	(Romania) Ilie Năstase (Romania) Ion Țiriac	2–6, 6–4, 6–4
Loss	3–1	1971	U.S. National Indoor Championships; Salisbury, US	Hard (i)	(Brazil) Thomaz Koch	(Spain) Juan Gisbert Sr. (Spain) Manuel Orantes	3–6, 6–4, 6–7
Win	4–1	1971	Macon, US	Hard	(Brazil) Thomaz Koch	(Socialist Federal Republic of Yugoslavia) Željko Franulović (Czechoslovakia) Jan Kodeš	6–3, 7–6
Loss	4–2	1971	Hampton, US	Hard (i)	(Brazil) Thomaz Koch	(Romania) Ilie Năstase (Romania) Ion Țiriac	4–6, 6–4, 5–7
Loss	4–3	1971	U.S. National Clay Court Championships; Indianapolis, US	Clay	(United States) Erik van Dillen	(Socialist Federal Republic of Yugoslavia) Željko Franulović (Czechoslovakia) Jan Kodeš	6–7, 7–5, 3–6
Win	5–3	1971	Merion, US	Hard	(United States) Jim Osborne	(United States) Robert McKinley (United States) Dick Stockton	7–6, 6–3
Loss	5–4	1971	South Orange, US	Hard	(United States) Erik van Dillen	(Australia) Bob Carmichael (United States) Tom Leonard	4–6, 6–4, 4–6
Loss	5–5	1971	Los Angeles, US	Hard	(United States) Frank Froehling	(Australia) John Alexander (Australia) Phil Dent	6–7, 4–6
Loss	5–6	1972	Washington, US	Carpet	(Brazil) Thomaz Koch	(United States) Tom Edlefsen (United States) Cliff Richey	4–6, 3–6
Loss	5–7	1972	Bristol, England	Grass	(Australia) Lew Hoad	(South Africa) Bob Hewitt (South Africa) Frew McMillan	3–6, 2–6
Win	6–7	1973	Baltimore, US	Hard (i)	(United States) Jimmy Connors	(United States) Paul Gerken (United States) Sandy Mayer	3–6, 6–2, 6–3
Loss	6–8	1973	Birmingham, US	Hard	(Romania) Ion Țiriac	(South Africa) Pat Cramer (West Germany) Jürgen Fassbender	4–6, 5–7
Win	7–8	1973	U.S. National Indoor Championships; Salisbury, US	Hard (i)	(Romania) Ilie Năstase	(West Germany) Jürgen Fassbender (Spain) Juan Gisbert Sr.	2–6, 6–4, 6–3
Win	8–8	1973	Hampton, US	Hard (i)	(Romania) Ilie Năstase	(United States) Jimmy Connors (Romania) Ion Țiriac	6–2, 6–1
Loss	8–9	1973	Louisville, US	Clay	(Australia) John Newcombe	(Spain) Manuel Orantes (Romania) Ion Țiriac	6–0, 4–6, 3–6
Loss	8–10	1974	Baltimore, US	Carpet	(Australia) Owen Davidson	(West Germany) Jürgen Fassbender (West Germany) Karl Meiler	6–7, 5–7
Loss	8–11	1974	St. Petersburg WCT, US	Hard	(United States) Charlie Pasarell	(Australia) Owen Davidson (Australia) John Newcombe	6–4, 3–6, 4–6
Win	9–11	1974	La Costa WCT, US	Hard	(United States) Charlie Pasarell	(Australia) Roy Emerson (United States) Dennis Ralston	6–4, 6–7, 7–5
Win	10–11	1975	Boca Raton, US	Hard	(Spain) Juan Gisbert Sr.	(West Germany) Jürgen Fassbender (Spain) Juan Gisbert Sr.	6–2, 6–1
Win	11–11	1976	Boca Raton, US	Hard	(United States) Vitas Gerulaitis	(United States) Bruce Manson (United States) Butch Walts	6–2, 6–4

== See also ==
- Professional Tennis Championships
