= Dick Leach =

American tennis player and coach (1940–2023)

- Country (sports): United States
- Born: March 6, 1940
- Died: October 10, 2023 (aged 83)

Singles
- Career record: 13–14

Grand Slam singles results
- US Open: 2R (1966, 1969)

Richard N. Leach Sr. (March 6, 1940 – October 10, 2023) was an American professional tennis player and coach. He was the father of tennis players Jon Leach and Rick Leach. Lindsay Davenport, who married Jon, is his daughter-in-law.

Leach coached the USC Trojans men's tennis team for 23 years from 1980 to 2002, leading them to the 1991, 1993, 1994, and 2002 NCAA team championships. He was twice named ITA Coach of the Year and was Pac-10 Coach of the Year on four occasions. As a player in the 1960s he had been an All-American for the Trojans and competed at the US Open.

Leach died on October 10, 2023, at the age of 83.
