= Woody Blocher =

American tennis player (born 1951)

- Full name: John Woodward Blocher II
- Country (sports): United States
- Born: August 24, 1951 (age 73); Pasadena, California, U.S.
- Height: 5 ft 8 in (173 cm)
- Plays: Right-handed

Singles
- Career record: 4–30
- Highest ranking: No. 156 (January 16, 1978)

Grand Slam singles results
- Australian Open: 1R (1977^{Dec})
- Wimbledon: 1R (1975)
- US Open: 2R (1969)

Doubles
- Career record: 13–38

Grand Slam doubles results
- Australian Open: 2R (1977^{Dec})
- US Open: 2R (1969)

John Woodward Blocher II (born August 24, 1951) is an American former professional tennis player.

Born in California, Blocher started getting tennis lessons at the age of seven and was a successful junior player. In 1967, competing in the 16's age division, Blocher won an Orange Bowl title and was the national clay court champion.

Blocher played collegiate tennis for Southern Methodist University but was sidelined for much of the time with a serious wrist injury, although he was an All-American in his senior year.

While playing on the professional tour in the 1970s he reached a best singles ranking of 156 and featured in the main draw at Wimbledon.

Since the 1980s he has coached tennis, in North Carolina and San Diego. He has run his own tennis academies and coached numerous player on the professional tour, including Marianne Werdel and Tim Wilkison.
