= Stanley Pasarell =

Puerto Rican professional tennis player (born 1948)

- Full name: Stanley Juan Pasarell
- Country (sports): Puerto Rico
- Born: February 11, 1948 (age 77); Santurce, San Juan
- Height: 6 ft 1 in (185 cm)

Singles
- Career record: 5–16
- Highest ranking: No. 270 (Nov 6, 1974)

Grand Slam singles results
- French Open: Q1 (1972)
- Wimbledon: Q1 (1972)
- US Open: 2R (1967, 1970)
Medal record
Central American and Caribbean Games
Silver medal – second place	1966 San Juan	Men's singles
Silver medal – second place	1966 San Juan	Men's doubles
Silver medal – second place	1966 San Juan	Mixed doubles

Stanley Juan Pasarell (born February 11, 1948) is a Puerto Rican former professional tennis player.

Born into a famous Puerto Rican tennis family in San Juan, Pasarell was the 14 and under Orange Bowl champion in 1962 and played collegiate tennis for Stanford University. He is the younger brother of Charlie Pasarell.

Pasarell was singles runner-up to Rafael Osuna at the 1966 Central American and Caribbean Games and won two further silver medals in doubles. He competed in the demonstration event at the 1968 Summer Olympics.
