= Jean-Loup Rouyer =

French tennis player

- Full name: Jean-Loup Rouyer
- Country (sports): France
- Born: 4 August 1945 Remiremont, France
- Died: 28 December 2007 (aged 62)

Singles
- Career record: 172–139
- Career titles: 6

Grand Slam singles results
- Australian Open: 2R (1969)
- French Open: 3R (1970, 1971, 1974)
- Wimbledon: 2R (1969)
- US Open: 3R (1969)

Doubles
- Career record: 15–32
- Career titles: 0

Grand Slam doubles results
- Australian Open: 1R (1969)
- French Open: 3R (1969, 1971)
- Wimbledon: 1R (1969, 1970, 1971)
- US Open: 3R (1970)

Jean-Loup Rouyer (4 August 1945 – 28 December 2007) was a professional tennis player from France.

== Biography ==
Born in Remiremont, Rouyer began playing tennis at the age of 12. He was a graduate of the École Polytechnique in 1965.

=== Tennis career ===
Rouyer represented the France Davis Cup team in three doubles rubbers, which all came in the 1970 Davis Cup competition with Jean-Baptiste Chanfreau, against Switzerland, Austria and Spain. They won two of those matches, over the Swiss pairing of Dimitri Sturdza/Matthias Werren and Austrians Hans Kary/Peter Pokorny.

In 1971 he made the quarter-finals of Grand Prix tournaments in Catania and Eastbourne, then in 1972 reached further quarter-finals at the Italian Open in Rome and the Suisse Open Gstaad. One of his wins in Rome was over leading American player Stan Smith.

During his career, Rouyer competed in all four Grand Slam tournaments. He made the third round of the French Open three times, the last in 1974, which was his eighth successive main draw appearance at Roland Garros. His third round loss in the 1974 French Open was to eventual champion Björn Borg.

=== Later life ===
An engineer, Rouyer joined CEA in 1975 and worked there in high level roles until 1990. He then joined EDF, where he was still at when he retired in 2005.

Rouyer died from an illness at the age of 62 on 28 December 2007.

== See also ==
- List of France Davis Cup team representatives
