= William Higgins (tennis) =

American tennis player (1942–2022)

- Full name: William C. "Billy" Higgins, Jr.
- Country (sports): United States
- Born: April 2, 1942 Lawton, Oklahoma, US
- Died: January 21, 2022 (aged 79) Florida, US

Singles
- Career record: 19–37
- Highest ranking: No. 115 (Aug 23, 1973)

Grand Slam singles results
- French Open: 1R (1966)
- Wimbledon: 1R (1969)
- US Open: 3R (1963, 1970)

William Higgins (April 2, 1942 – January 21, 2022) was an American professional tennis player.

Higgins, an Oklahoma native, was active on tour in the 1960s and 1970s, twice reaching the singles third round of the US Open. He recorded a top singles ranking of No. 115 in the world.

He died at his home in Florida on January 21, 2022, after a short illness.
