= Jasjit Singh (tennis) =

Indian tennis player

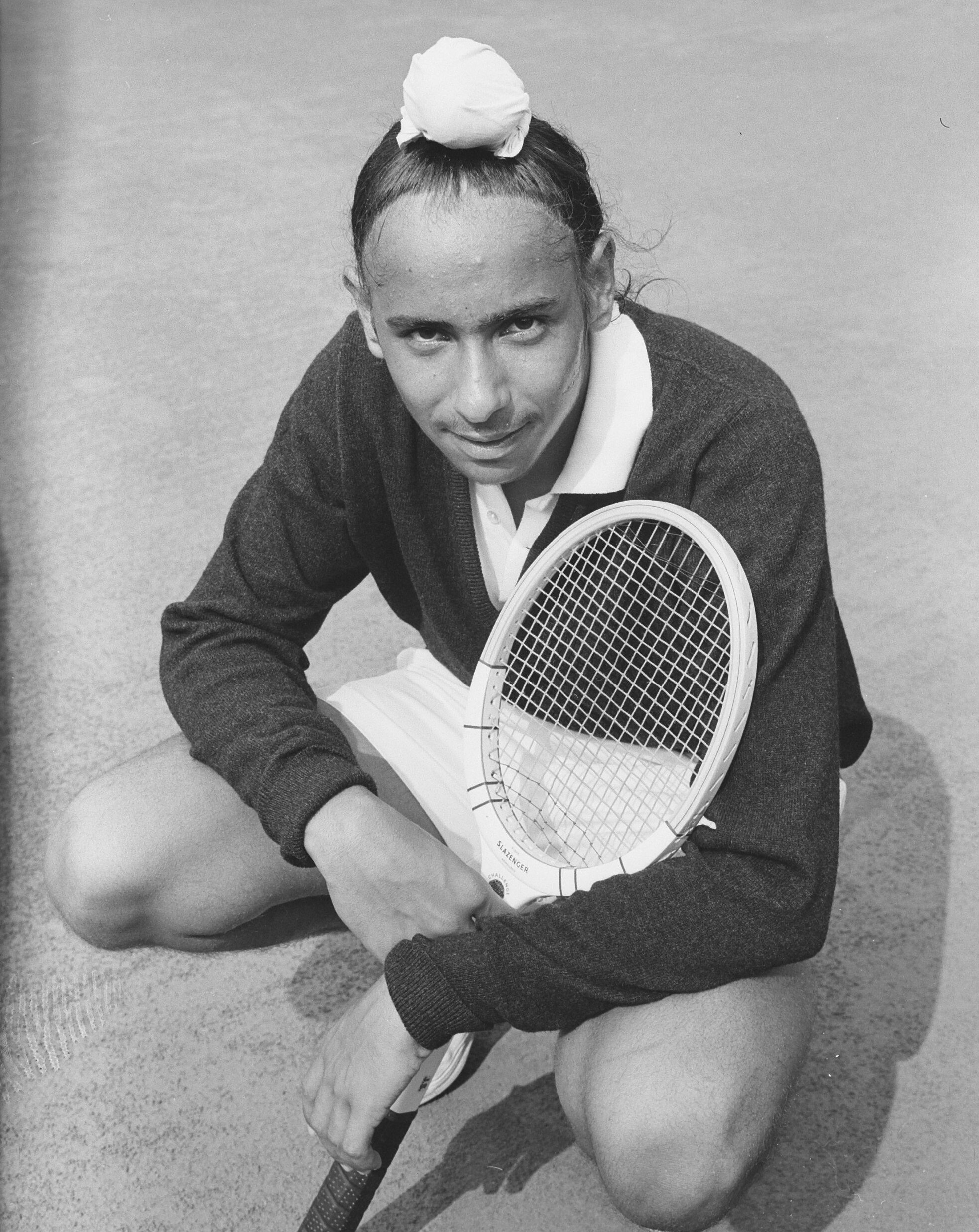
- Full name: Jasjit Singh
- Country (sports): India
- Born: 4 February 1948 (age 78) New Delhi, India
- Plays: Right-handed

Singles
- Career record: 114–125 (47.7%)
- Career titles: 2
- Highest ranking: No. 89 (3 June 1974)

Grand Slam singles results
- Australian Open: 2R (1975)
- Wimbledon: 1R (1973, 1974)
- US Open: 2R (1969)

Doubles
- Career record: 12–31
- Career titles: 0

Grand Slam doubles results
- Australian Open: 2R (1975)
- US Open: 2R (1973, 1974)

Grand Slam mixed doubles results
- US Open: QF (1973)

Jasjit Singh (born 4 February 1948) is a former professional tennis player from India.

== Biography ==
Singh, who was born in New Delhi, became the first Sikh to play for the India Davis Cup team when he was selected in the side during the 1974 Davis Cup. His first appearance was a loss to Japan's Toshiro Sakai in a dead rubber, as India had already secured the tie. India then faced the Australian team in the Eastern Zone final and Jasjit was chosen ahead of Anand Amritraj to play the first singles rubber. In front of a Calcutta crowd, Singh managed to beat his Australian opponent Bob Giltinan in four sets, to give India a 1–0 lead. A win by John Alexander was cancelled out by a win to India in the doubles, which meant that Singh had a chance to secure the tie in the reverse singles against Alexander. He was unable to beat Alexander, but India won the tie 3–2 after Vijay Amritraj defeated Giltinan in the deciding match. The next fixture for India was the Inter-Zone semi-final, which they won over the Soviet Union, to qualify for the Davis Cup final. Singh didn't feature in that tie and didn't get a chance to play in the final against South Africa, as the Indians forfeited in protest of the apartheid regime.

He played on the ILTF World Circuit from 1963. In 1965 he won his first senior title at the Guyan Invitation played in Huntington, West Virginia against Roger Beach. In 1966 he then won the Western Indoor Championships held in Chicago against Gary Baxter.

In 1972 he reached the finals of the Lake Worth Open in Florida where he lost to Nikola Špear. In 1973 he played on the ILTF European Circuit where he reached the finals of the Trofeo La Moraleja in Madrid losing to Ian Fletcher. The same year he was also a losing finalist at the Tasmanian Open Championships in Hobart against Colin Dibley.

On the Grand Prix tennis circuit he made quarter-finals at Argentina International Championships in Buenos Aires in 1972 and at his home event in New Delhi in 1973. He was a doubles finalist with Marcello Lara in the 1977 Indian Open, held in Bombay.

He competed in the main singles draw of all four Grand Slam tournaments. His greatest success came in the mixed doubles, a quarter-final appearance at the 1973 US Open, with Ilana Kloss.

Since retiring he has lived in New York.

== Grand Prix career finals ==
=== Doubles: 1 (0–1) ===
Result	W/L	Date	Tournament	Surface	Partner	Opponents	Score
Loss	0–1	Dec 1977	Bombay, India	Clay	(Mexico) Marcello Lara	(United States) Mike Cahill (United States) Terry Moor	7–6, 4–6, 4–6

== See also ==
- List of India Davis Cup team representatives
