= 1970 US Open (tennis) =

- Date: September 2–13
- Edition: 90th
- Category: Grand Slam (ITF)
- Surface: Grass
- Location: Forest Hills, Queens, United States
- Venue: West Side Tennis Club
- Attendance: 122,996

Champions

Men's singles
- (Australia) Ken Rosewall

Women's singles
- (Australia) Margaret Court

Men's doubles
- (France) Pierre Barthès / (Socialist Federal Republic of Yugoslavia) Nikola Pilić

Women's doubles
- (Australia) Margaret Court / (Australia) Judy Tegart-Dalton

Mixed doubles
- (Australia) Margaret Court / (United States) Marty Riessen
- US Open

The 1970 US Open was a tennis tournament that took place on the outdoor grass courts at the West Side Tennis Club in Forest Hills, Queens, in New York City, New York. The tournament was held from September 2 until September 13, 1970. It was the 90th staging of the US Open, and the fourth Grand Slam tennis event of 1970.

It was the first Grand Slam tournament in which the tiebreak was used to decide the set at a 6–6 score. The 1970 US Open was the first tournament to introduce a final set tie-break in a Grand Slam. It differed from the current tie-break scoring in that it was won by the first player to reach five points with a sudden death at 4–4. A red flag would be put up by the umpire's seat to draw fan attention to the tiebreaker in progress. Most players disapproved of the tiebreaker but the visitors loved it.

== Finals ==
=== Men's singles ===
(Australia) Ken Rosewall defeated (Australia) Tony Roche, 2–6, 6–4, 7–6^{(5–2)}, 6–3

• It was Rosewall's 6th career Grand Slam singles title, his 2nd during the Open Era and his 2nd and last at the US Open.

=== Women's singles ===
(Australia) Margaret Court defeated (United States) Rosemary Casals, 6–2, 2–6, 6–1

• It was Court's 20th career Grand Slam singles title, her 7th during the Open Era and her 4th at the US Open.
With this title, Court completed the Grand Slam (winning all 4 major tournaments in one calendar year).

=== Men's doubles ===
(France) Pierre Barthès / (Socialist Federal Republic of Yugoslavia) Nikola Pilić defeated (Australia) Roy Emerson / (Australia) Rod Laver, 6–3, 7–6, 4–6, 7–6

• It was Barthès' 1st and only career Grand Slam doubles title.
• It was Pilić's 1st and only career Grand Slam doubles title.

=== Women's doubles ===
(Australia) Margaret Court / (Australia) Judy Tegart-Dalton defeated (United States) Rosemary Casals / (United Kingdom) Virginia Wade, 6–3, 6–4

• It was Court's 10th career Grand Slam doubles title, her 5th during the Open Era and her 3rd at the US Open.
• It was Tegart Dalton's 7th career Grand Slam doubles title, her 4th during the Open Era and her 1st at the US Open.

=== Mixed doubles ===
(Australia) Margaret Court / (United States) Marty Riessen defeated (Australia) Judy Tegart-Dalton / (South Africa) Frew McMillan, 6–4, 6–4

== Prize money ==
Event		W	F	SF	QF	4R	3R	2R	1R
Singles	Men	$20,000	$10,000	$5,000	$2,500	$1,250	$900	$600	$300
Singles	Women	$7,500	$3,750	$1,750	$1,250	–	$625	$400	$150

Preceded by 1970 Wimbledon Championships	Grand Slams	Succeeded by 1971 Australian Open
