= Pierre Barthès =

French tennis player (born 1941)

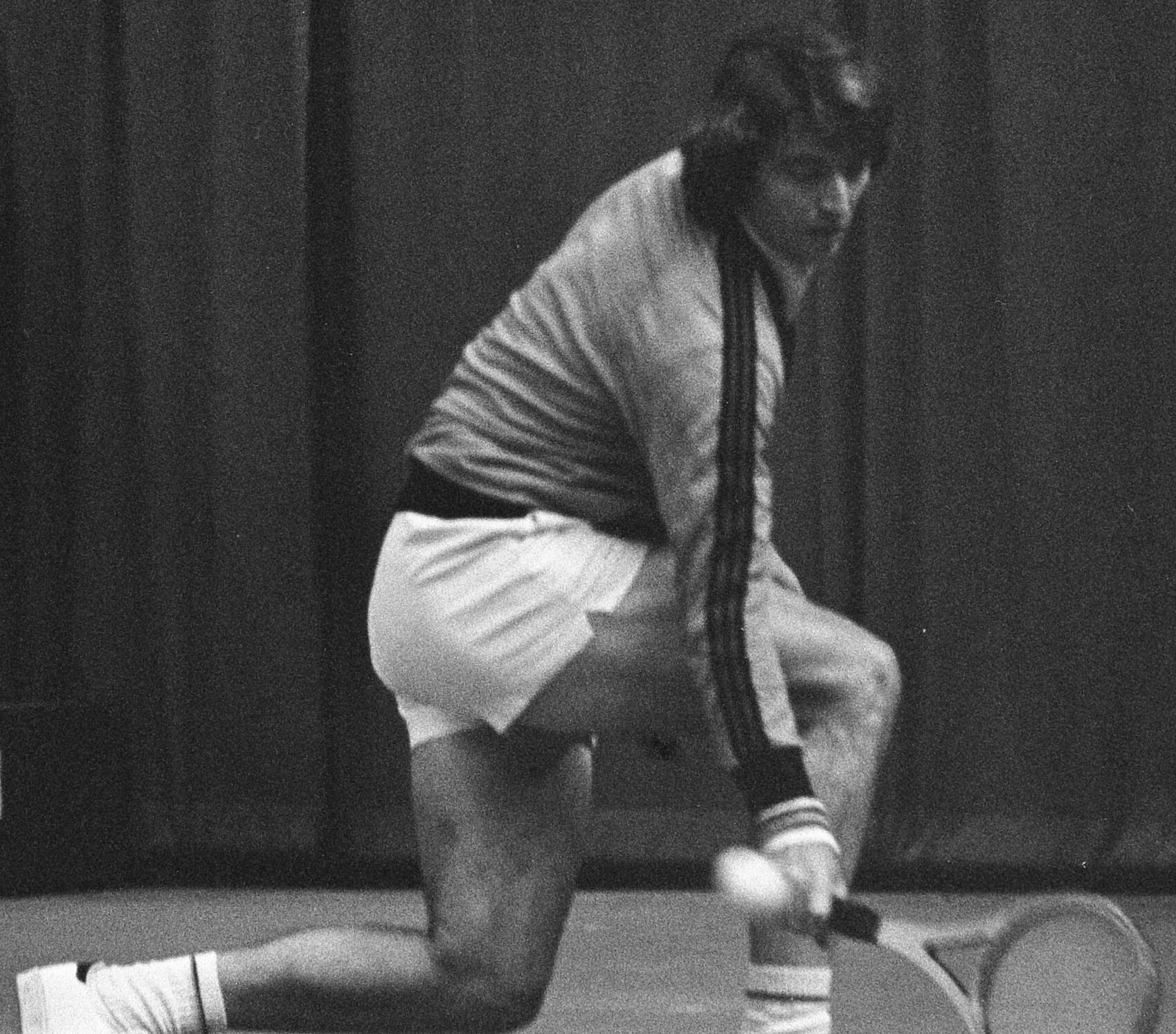
- Country (sports): France
- Residence: Vaucresson, France
- Born: 13 September 1941 (age 84) Béziers, France
- Turned pro: 1966 (amateur from 1962)
- Retired: 1976
- Plays: Right-handed (one-handed backhand)

Singles
- Career record: 351–349 (50.1%)
- Career titles: 7
- Highest ranking: No. 9 (1971, World's Top 10)

Grand Slam singles results
- Australian Open: 3R (1965)
- French Open: QF (1965)
- Wimbledon: 4R (1964, 1972)
- US Open: 4R (1965)

Other tournaments
- Tour Finals: RR (1971)
- Professional majors
- US Pro: 1R (1966, 1967)
- Wembley Pro: QF (1966)
- French Pro: 1R (1966, 1967)

Doubles
- Career record: 99–82 (Open era)
- Career titles: 5 (Open era)

Grand Slam doubles results
- Australian Open: SF (1965)
- French Open: 4R (1969, 1971)
- Wimbledon: 3R (1970, 1972)
- US Open: W (1970)

Grand Slam mixed doubles results
- Australian Open: QF (1965)

Pierre Barthès (born 13 September 1941) is a retired French tennis player.

== Career ==
Born in Béziers, Barthès was one of the Handsome Eight, a group of players signed by Lamar Hunt in 1968 for the newly formed professional World Championship Tennis (WCT) group. In 1974, he reached a career-high ATP singles ranking of world No. 54, though this is not a true indication, as he was one of the top 20 players in 1971 before the creation of the ATP ranking system, making the year-end Masters the same year. He was also a US Open doubles champion in 1970, partnering Nikola Pilić.

Barthès won the 1963 Pau Championships defeating Pierre Darmon in the final.

Barthès won the Paris All Saints indoor event the Coupe Albert Canet in 1963 defeating Darmon in the final.

Barthès won the Egyptian International Championships in Cairo in 1964 on clay defeating Martin Mulligan, Ismail El Shafei, and Istvan Gulyas in the final.

Barthès won the Altamira International Invitation in Caracas, Venezuela in 1965 on clay defeating Pancho Guzmán, Ron Holmberg, Ramanathan Krishnan, Frank Froehling III, and Manuel Santana in the final.

Barthès turned professional for the 1967 season. He won the Marseille Pro Championships on indoor wood that year defeating Mike Davies, Ken Rosewall, and Fred Stolle in the final. He won the Grenoble, France indoor hardcourt event in 1970 defeating Cliff Drysdale, Rod Laver, and Andres Gimeno in the final.

== Grand Slam finals ==
=== Doubles: 1 (1 title) ===
Result	Year	Championship	Surface	Partner	Opponents	Score
Win	1970	US Open	Grass	(Socialist Federal Republic of Yugoslavia) Niki Pilić	(Australia) Roy Emerson (Australia) Rod Laver	6–3, 7–6, 4–6, 7–6
