= Dick Dell =

American tennis player

- Full name: Richard Dell
- Country (sports): United States
- Born: 1947 (age 78–79) Washington D.C., U.S.
- Retired: 1977
- Plays: Right-handed

Singles
- Career record: 39–106
- Career titles: No. 98 (December 14, 1973)

Grand Slam singles results
- French Open: 2R (1965)
- Wimbledon: 1R (1974, 1975)
- US Open: 2R (1967, 1968, 1974)

Doubles
- Career record: 82–110
- Career titles: 2

Grand Slam doubles results
- Australian Open: 1R (1970)
- French Open: 3R (1969, 1976)
- Wimbledon: 3R (1975)
- US Open: 3R (1973, 1974)

Richard Dell (born 1947) is a former professional tennis player from the United States.

== Biography ==
Dell, who won a gold medal at the 1965 Summer Universiade in the men's doubles with Allen Fox, attended the University of Michigan from 1965 to 1969. A member of the varsity tennis team, Dell was the Big Ten Singles Champion in 1969. As he was beginning a law degree at the University of Virginia his number was called out in the Vietnam War draft. Following basic training, Dell became a squash and tennis coach at the United States Military Academy at West Point.

He created history in 1967 when he took part in the longest ever doubles match. Partnering Dick Leach at the Newport Casino Invitational, the pair defeated Tom Mozur and Lenny Schloss, 3–6, 49–47, 22–20.

On the Grand Prix tennis circuit he won two titles, both in the doubles with Sherwood Stewart. They won their first title together in Tokyo in 1972 then a second in Cincinnati in 1974. As a singles player he made the second round of the US Open on three occasions and came close to getting a win over Rod Laver in Hong Kong in 1973 when he was a set and a break up. He had his most noted singles performances on tour in 1974, when he upset John Alexander at a WCT tournament in Washington DC and made the semi-finals in Chicago, after beating Raúl Ramírez in the quarter-finals. At the 1975 Wimbledon Championships, Dell and Stewart made it to the third round of the doubles, where they took former champions Bob Hewitt and Frew McMillan to five sets.

Dell retired from tennis in 1977 and took up a coaching job in Maui. He returned to the University of Virginia in the 1980s and completed a Doctor of Law.

For many year he was the agent of Gabriela Sabatini, while working for ProServ, a company founded by his elder brother Donald Dell.

== Grand Prix career finals ==
=== Doubles: 2 (2–0) ===
Result	W/L	Date	Tournament	Surface	Partner	Opponents	Score
Win	1–0	Oct 1972	Tokyo, Japan	Hard	(United States) Sherwood Stewart	(Mexico) Marcelo Lara (New Zealand) Jeff Simpson	6–3, 6–2
Win	2–0	Aug 1974	Cincinnati, U. S.	Hard	(United States) Sherwood Stewart	(United States) Jim Delaney (United States) John Whitlinger	4–6, 7–6, 6–2
