= Chauncey Steele III =

American tennis player

- Country (sports): United States
- Born: February 16, 1944 (age 82) Long Beach, California, U.S.

Grand Slam singles results
- Wimbledon: 1R (1967, 1969, 1970)
- US Open: 2R (1961, 1965)

Chauncey Depew "Chum" Steele III (born February 16, 1944) is a former tennis player from the United States. His father, Chauncey Steele, Jr., also played tennis.

Steele competed at the US Open ten times and made three appearances at Wimbledon.

He worked as a stockbroker.
