= Robert McKinley (tennis) =

American tennis player (born 1950)

Robert "Bob" McKinley
- Country (sports): United States
- Residence: College Station, Texas, U.S.
- Born: August 5, 1950 (age 74); St. Louis, Missouri, U.S.
- Plays: Right-handed

Singles

Grand Slam singles results
- Wimbledon: 4R (1973)

Doubles

Grand Slam doubles results
- US Open: SF (1972)

Robert McKinley (born August 5, 1950) is a former professional tennis player for the ATP Tour. He is currently the assistant men's tennis coach at Texas A&M University.

As a professional player, McKinley reached as high as No. 50 in the ATP singles rankings, and reached the semi-finals of the 1972 U.S. Open doubles draw with partner Dick Stockton.

McKinley was a 4-time all-American at Trinity University in San Antonio, Texas, and captained Trinity's 1972 NCAA Men's Tennis Championship. He also led Trinity to the NCAA finals as a coach in 1977 and 1979, and was named the NCAA coach of the year after the 1977 season. As a junior player, he was ranked the No. 1 junior tennis player in the United States.

He is the brother of tennis player Chuck McKinley.
