= 1972 Tanglewood International Tennis Classic =

- Date: July 25–30
- Edition: 2nd
- Category: Grand Prix (Group D)
- Draw: 32S / 16D
- Prize money: $25,000
- Surface: Clay / outdoor
- Location: Clemmons, North Carolina, United States
- Venue: Tanglewood Tennis Center

Champions

Singles
- (South Africa) Bob Hewitt

Doubles
- (South Africa) Bob Hewitt / (South Africa) Frew McMillan
← 1971 ·	Tanglewood International Tennis Classic	· 1973 →

The 1972 Tanglewood International Tennis Classic was a men's tennis tournament held at Tanglewood Tennis Center in Clemmons, North Carolina in the United States that was part of the Grand Prix circuit and categorized as a Group D event. The tournament was played on outdoor clay courts and was held from July 25 through July 30, 1972. It was the second edition of the tournament and Bob Hewitt won the singles title and earned $5,000 first-prize money.

== Finals ==
=== Singles ===
(South Africa) Bob Hewitt defeated (Rhodesia) Andrew Pattison 3–6, 6–3, 6–1

- It was Hewitt's 7th singles title of the year and the 32nd of his career in the Open Era.

=== Doubles ===
(South Africa) Bob Hewitt / (Rhodesia) Andrew Pattison defeated (United States) Jim McManus / (United States) Jim Osborne 6–4, 6–4
