= 1971 Tanglewood International Tennis Classic =

- Date: July 19–25
- Edition: 1st
- Category: Grand Prix (Group C)
- Draw: 62S / 16D
- Prize money: $25,000
- Surface: Clay / outdoor
- Location: Clemmons, North Carolina, United States
- Venue: Tanglewood Park

Champions

Singles
- (Chile) Jaime Fillol

Doubles
- (United States) Jim McManus / (United States) Jim Osborne
Tanglewood International Tennis Classic	· 1972 →

The 1971 Tanglewood International Tennis Classic was a men's tennis tournament held at Tanglewood Park in Clemmons, North Carolina in the United States that was part of the Grand Prix circuit and categorized as a Group C event. The tournament was played on outdoor clay courts and was held from July 19 through July 25, 1971. It was the inaugural edition of the tournament and unseeded Jaime Fillol won the singles title and earned $5,000 first-prize money.

== Finals ==
=== Singles ===
(Chile) Jaime Fillol defeated (Socialist Federal Republic of Yugoslavia) Željko Franulović 4–6, 6–4, 7–6

- It was Fillol's 1st singles title of the year and the 2nd of his career in the Open Era.

=== Doubles ===
(United States) Jim McManus / (United States) Jim Osborne defeated (United States) Jimmy Connors / (United States) Jeff Austin 6–2, 6–4
