= 1968 Wimbledon Championships – Men's singles qualifying =

Men's singles qualifying
- 1968 Wimbledon Championships

Events
Singles	men	women		boys	girls
Doubles	men	women	mixed	boys	girls
WC Singles	men	women	quad
WC Doubles	men	women	quad
Legends	men	women	seniors

Qualification
Singles	men	women
Doubles	men	women	mixed
- Wimbledon Championships

Players who neither had high enough rankings nor received wild cards to enter the main draw of the annual Wimbledon Tennis Championships participated in a qualifying tournament held one week before the event. Several players withdrew from the main draw after qualifying had commenced, leading to the highest ranked players who lost in the final qualifying round to be entered into the main draw as lucky losers.

== Qualifiers ==
1. (South Africa) Terry Ryan
2. (United Kingdom) David Lloyd
3. (Ecuador) Eduardo Zuleta
4. (Australia) John Brown
5. (Belgium) Patrick Hombergen
6. (West Germany) Jürgen Fassbender
7. (Pakistan) Haroon Rahim
8. (United Kingdom) Geoffrey Bluett
9. (South Africa) Derek Schroder
10. (United Kingdom) Stanley Matthews

== Lucky losers ==
1. (Argentina) Raúl Peralta
2. (Jamaica) Lance Lumsden
3. (Colombia) Francisco Castillo
4. (United Kingdom) Clay Iles

== Qualifying draw ==
Key

- Q = Qualifier
- WC = Wild card
- LL = Lucky loser
- Alt = Alternate
- ITF = ITF entry
- PR = Protected ranking
- SR = Special ranking
- SE = Special exempt
- JE = Junior exempt
- JR = Junior Accelerator Programme entrant
- CO = College Accelerator Programme entrant
- NG = Next Gen Accelerator Program entrant
- w/o = Walkover
- r = Retired
- d = Defaulted

=== First qualifier ===
First round
1	(Belgium) Claude De Gronckel	3	0	2
8	(Australia) Ian Fletcher	6	6	6
4	(West Germany) Hans-Jürgen Pohmann	2	6	5	9
5	(United Kingdom) Lindsay Murphy	6	2	7	11
2	(New Zealand) Richard Hawkes	6	7	4	6
7	(United States) Reynaldo Garrido	2	5	6	3
3	(France) Pierre Joly	11	7	6	2	2
6	(South Africa) Terry Ryan	9	9	3	6	6

Second round
(Australia) Ian Fletcher	6	6	6
(United Kingdom) Lindsay Murphy	4	2	1
(New Zealand) Richard Hawkes	4	6	7
(South Africa) Terry Ryan	6	8	9

Qualifying competition
(Australia) Ian Fletcher	6	6	2	6	4
(South Africa) Terry Ryan	8	4	6	0	6

=== Second qualifier ===
First round
1	(Australia) Barry Geraghty	9	5	6	3	1
8	(Japan) Isao Watanabe	7	7	3	6	6
4	(United States) Norman Perry	6	2	6	5	6
5	(United Kingdom) Ken Weatherley	3	6	3	7	2
2	(United Kingdom) David Lloyd	6	6	6
7	(South Africa) Hermann Abrahams	1	3	4
3	(Netherlands) Fred Hemmes	3	1	6
6	(Sweden) Lars Ölander	6	6	8

Second round
(Japan) Isao Watanabe	1	6	1	6	6
(United States) Norman Perry	6	1	6	3	2
(United Kingdom) David Lloyd	6	6	6
(Sweden) Lars Ölander	4	2	4

Qualifying competition
(Japan) Isao Watanabe	2	6	1	3
(United Kingdom) David Lloyd	6	4	6	6

=== Third qualifier ===
First round
1	(Switzerland) Theodor Stalder	5	3	4
8	(Netherlands) Pieter Soeters	7	6	6
4	(South Africa) Quentin Pretorius	4	4	2
5	(Ecuador) Eduardo Zuleta	6	6	6
2	(Australia) Bob Giltinan	6	3	3	2
7	(Belgium) Eric Drossart	2	6	6	6
3	(Italy) Vittorio Crotta	11	6	6
6	(Romania) Sever Dron	9	4	2

Second round
(Netherlands) Pieter Soeters	0	3	6	7	3
(Ecuador) Eduardo Zuleta	6	6	4	5	6
(Belgium) Eric Drossart	6	3	7	4	5
(Italy) Vittorio Crotta	3	6	5	6	7

Qualifying competition
(Ecuador) Eduardo Zuleta	6	7	6
(Italy) Vittorio Crotta	2	5	0

=== Fourth qualifier ===
First round
1	(United Kingdom) John Williams	7	10	2
8	(United States) Paul Sullivan	9	12	6
4	(France) François Battegay	2	0	4
5	(South Africa) Rohan Summers	6	6	6
2	(United Kingdom) Simon Partridge	8	1	7	3
7	(United Kingdom) John Paish	10	6	5	6
3	(West Germany) Axel Geuer	2	4	5
6	(Australia) John Brown	6	6	7

Second round
(United States) Paul Sullivan	6	0	6	2	6
(South Africa) Rohan Summers	3	6	1	6	2
(United Kingdom) John Paish	3	4	3
(Australia) John Brown	6	6	6

Qualifying competition
(United States) Paul Sullivan	7	10	3	2
(Australia) John Brown	5	12	6	6

=== Fifth qualifier ===
First round
1	(Belgium) Patrick Hombergen	4	2	6	6	6
8	(United States) Jerry De Witts	6	6	1	2	2
4	(United Kingdom) Roy Dixon	6	6	6
5	(France) Patrick Proisy	2	3	4
2	(Australia) Graham Primrose	6	4	4	4
7	(Argentina) Raúl Peralta	2	6	6	6
3	(Peru) Tomás González	6	6	3	6
6	(Australia) Lindsay Straney	4	3	6	3

Second round
(Belgium) Patrick Hombergen	6	6	6
(United Kingdom) Roy Dixon	0	3	1
(Argentina) Raúl Peralta	8	6	6
(Peru) Tomás González	6	2	3

Qualifying competition
(Belgium) Patrick Hombergen	6	6	6
(Argentina) Raúl Peralta	2	2	2

=== Sixth qualifier ===
First round
1	(Soviet Union) Anatoli Volkov	6	7	8
8	(Colombia) Iván Molina	1	5	6
4	(South Africa) Mel Baleson	8	8	5	3
5	(United Kingdom) John Clifton	10	6	7	6
2	(Australia) Colin Dibley	3	2	7
7	(United States) Lenny Schloss	6	6	9
3	(France) Marc Boulle	1	4	3
6	(West Germany) Jürgen Fassbender	6	6	6

Second round
(Soviet Union) Anatoli Volkov	9	0	2	4
(United Kingdom) John Clifton	7	6	6	6
(United States) Lenny Schloss	6	1	4	7	8
(West Germany) Jürgen Fassbender	3	6	6	5	10

Qualifying competition
(United Kingdom) John Clifton	6	4	4	12	4
(West Germany) Jürgen Fassbender	3	6	6	10	6

=== Seventh qualifier ===
First round
1	(Pakistan) Haroon Rahim	6	6	6
8	(Australia) Peter Avery	2	4	4
4	(Peru) Alfredo Acuna	2	4	6	3
5	(Italy) Sergio Palmieri	6	6	3	6
2	(France) Jean-Loup Rouyer	4	3	15	6	4
7	(Australia) Doug Smith	6	6	13	4	6
3	(South Africa) Jasmat Dhiraj	6	2	8	6	4
6	(United Kingdom) John Ward	3	6	10	1	6

Second round
(Pakistan) Haroon Rahim	6	6	6
(Italy) Sergio Palmieri	2	1	4
(Australia) Doug Smith	5	7	7	3	6
(United Kingdom) John Ward	7	5	5	6	3

Qualifying competition
(Pakistan) Haroon Rahim	10	6	6
(Australia) Doug Smith	8	2	4

=== Eighth qualifier ===
First round
1	(Hungary) S Toth	1	3	1
8	(Colombia) Francisco Castillo	6	6	6
4	(Australia) George Szakacs	6	4	2	1
5	(Pakistan) Munawar Iqbal	0	6	6	6
2	(Bolivia) Eduardo Gorostiaga	2	2	4
7	(United Kingdom) Geoffrey Bluett	6	6	6
3	(United Kingdom) Colin McHugo	1	8	5
6	(South Africa) Rauty Krog	6	10	7

Second round
(Colombia) Francisco Castillo	6	6	6
(Pakistan) Munawar Iqbal	3	1	1
(United Kingdom) Geoffrey Bluett	6	7	6
(South Africa) Rauty Krog	3	5	2

Qualifying competition
(Colombia) Francisco Castillo	4	2	7
(United Kingdom) Geoffrey Bluett	6	6	9

=== Ninth qualifier ===
First round
1	(Australia) John Bartlett	6	6	4	2	2
8	(United Kingdom) Clay Iles	4	2	6	6	6
4	(Australia) Brian White	6	10	6	6
5	(West Germany) Karl Meiler	4	12	1	4
2	(United Kingdom) John De Mendoza	5	6	0	3
7	(United States) Richard Anderson	7	3	6	6
3	(South Africa) Derek Schroder	6	7	6
6	(Socialist Federal Republic of Yugoslavia) Zlatko Ivančić	4	5	4

Second round
(United Kingdom) Clay Iles	9	6	7
(Australia) Brian White	7	3	5
(United States) Richard Anderson	6	6	2	2	4
(South Africa) Derek Schroder	3	4	6	6	6

Qualifying competition
(United Kingdom) Clay Iles	3	2	4
(South Africa) Derek Schroder	6	6	6

=== Tenth qualifier ===
First round
1	(Mexico) Jaime Subirats	6	6	6
8	(United Kingdom) Keith Glass	3	3	2
4	(United Kingdom) Stanley Matthews	6	8	6
5	(Australia) Bryan Burrell	3	6	4
2	(Canada) Frank Tutvin	4	12	19	1
7	(Jamaica) Lance Lumsden	6	10	21	6
3	(France) Jean-Baptiste Chanfreau	7	2	5	6	3
6	(Australia) Ken Hiskins	5	6	7	4	6

Second round
(Mexico) Jaime Subirats	3	3	8
(United Kingdom) Stanley Matthews	6	6	10
(Jamaica) Lance Lumsden	6	5	6	6
(Australia) Ken Hiskins	3	7	4	3

Qualifying competition
(United Kingdom) Stanley Matthews	4	6	6	6
(Jamaica) Lance Lumsden	6	3	4	4
