= 1968 Wimbledon Championships – Women's singles qualifying =

Women's singles qualifying
- 1968 Wimbledon Championships

Events
| Singles | men | women | | boys | girls |
| Doubles | men | women | mixed | boys | girls |
| WC Singles | men | women | quad |
| WC Doubles | men | women | quad |
| Legends | men | women | seniors |

Qualification
| Singles | men | women |
| Doubles | men | women | mixed |
- Wimbledon Championships

Players who neither had high enough rankings nor received wild cards to enter the main draw of the annual Wimbledon Tennis Championships participated in a qualifying tournament held one week before the event.

== Qualifiers ==
1. (Australia) Margaret Harris
2. (Japan) Kazuko Sawamatsu
3. (Argentina) Raquel Giscafré
4. (United States) Nadine Netter
5. (Germany) Cora Schediwy
6. (Australia) Helen Amos
7. (Australia) Jenny Staley Hoad
8. (United States) Marilyn Aschner

== Lucky losers ==
1. (United Kingdom) Wendy Hall

== Qualifying draw ==
Key

- Q = Qualifier
- WC = Wild card
- LL = Lucky loser
- Alt = Alternate
- ITF = ITF entry
- PR = Protected ranking
- SR = Special ranking
- SE = Special exempt
- JE = Junior exempt
- JR = Junior Accelerator Programme entrant
- CO = College Accelerator Programme entrant
- NG = Next Gen Accelerator Program entrant
- w/o = Walkover
- r = Retired
- d = Defaulted

=== First qualifier ===
First round
1 | (Brazil) Suzana Petersen | 0 | 0
8 | (United Kingdom) Jean Fyfe | 6 | 6
4 | (France) Odile de Roubin | 2 | 6 | 6
5 | (United Kingdom) Elizabeth Joy | 6 | 4 | 8
2 | (Sweden) E.E. Andersson | 1 | 1
7 | (United Kingdom) Jane Poynder | 6 | 6
3 | (Peru) Virginia Cáceres | 2 | 4
6 | (Australia) Margaret Harris | 6 | 6

Second round
(United Kingdom) Jean Fyfe | 3 | 1
(United Kingdom) Elizabeth Joy | 6 | 6
(United Kingdom) Jane Poynder | 0 | 1
(Australia) Margaret Harris | 6 | 6

Qualifying competition
(United Kingdom) Elizabeth Joy | 3 | 0
(Australia) Margaret Harris | 6 | 6

=== Second qualifier ===
First round
1 | (Japan) Kazuko Sawamatsu | 6 | 6
8 | (Australia) Sue Alexander | 0 | 4
4 | (United Kingdom) Diane Bridger | 7 | 6
5 | (South Africa) Sally Mildner | 5 | 0
2 | (United Kingdom) Carolyn Camp | 1 | 6 | 6
7 | (United Kingdom) Penny Hardgrave | 6 | 4 | 3
3 | (Germany) Ziggi Cornish | 6 | 1
6 | (United Kingdom) Sue Tutt | 8 | 6

Second round
(Japan) Kazuko Sawamatsu | 6 | 6
(United Kingdom) Diane Bridger | 0 | 3
(United Kingdom) Carolyn Camp | 4 | 3
(United Kingdom) Sue Tutt | 6 | 6

Qualifying competition
(Japan) Kazuko Sawamatsu | 9 | 6
(United Kingdom) Sue Tutt | 7 | 1

=== Third qualifier ===
First round
1 | (Argentina) Raquel Giscafré | 6 | 7
8 | (United Kingdom) Averil Morris | 0 | 5
4 | (Netherlands) Judith Salomé | 2 | 1
5 | (Belgium) C.F. Penn | 6 | 6
2 | (United Kingdom) Christianne George | 3 | 2
7 | (United Kingdom) Elizabeth Ernest | 6 | 6
3 | (United Kingdom) Sally Holdsworth | 6 | 4
6 | (France) Marion Cristiani | 8 | 6

Second round
(Argentina) Raquel Giscafré | 6 | 6
(Belgium) C.F. Penn | 3 | 3
(United Kingdom) Elizabeth Ernest | 5 | 3
(France) Marion Cristiani | 7 | 6

Qualifying competition
(Argentina) Raquel Giscafré | 6 | 6
(France) Marion Cristiani | 1 | 1

=== Fourth qualifier ===
First round
1 | (United Kingdom) Sue Mappin | 4 | 1
8 | (United States) Nadine Netter | 6 | 6
4 | (South Africa) J. Davie | 0 | 0
5 | (United Kingdom) Heather Allen | 6 | 6
2 | (Canada) Andrée Martin | 1 | 1
7 | (United Kingdom) Pat Roberts | 6 | 6
3 | (United States) M.J. Donnelly | 1 | 0
6 | (New Zealand) Cynthia Fleming | 6 | 6

Second round
(United States) Nadine Netter | 9 | 6
(United Kingdom) Heather Allen | 7 | 2
(United Kingdom) Pat Roberts | 9 | 4 | 3
(New Zealand) Cynthia Fleming | 7 | 6 | 6

Qualifying competition
(United States) Nadine Netter | 6 | 6
(New Zealand) Cynthia Fleming | 3 | 3

=== Fifth qualifier ===
First round
1 | (Canada) Vicki Berner | 6 | 6
8 | (Ecuador) Margarita Zuleta | 2 | 1
4 | (United Kingdom) Anthea Rigby | 2 | 6 | 4
5 | (United Kingdom) Binnie Orchard | 6 | 0 | 6
2 | (United Kingdom) Jenny Helliar | 3 | 4
7 | (United States) B.L. Mattes | 6 | 6
3 | (United Kingdom) Sheila Burley | 2 | 5
6 | (Germany) Cora Schediwy | 6 | 7

Second round
(Canada) Vicki Berner | 6 | 7
(United Kingdom) Binnie Orchard | 4 | 5
(United States) B.L. Mattes | 3 | 4
(Germany) Cora Schediwy | 6 | 6

Qualifying competition
(Canada) Vicki Berner | 2 | 2
(Germany) Cora Schediwy | 6 | 6

=== Sixth qualifier ===
First round
1 | (Chile) Michelle Rodriguez | 6 | 4 | 6
8 | (United Kingdom) Jean Walker-Smith | 3 | 6 | 1
4 | (Australia) Helen Amos | 6 | 6
5 | (France) Maylis Burel | 3 | 2
2 | (United Kingdom) G. Mendham | 4 | 2
7 | (United Kingdom) Wendy Hall | 6 | 6
3 | (South Africa) Gillian Dove | 3 | 3
6 | (Japan) Junko Sawamatsu | 6 | 6

Second round
(Chile) Michelle Rodriguez | 6 | 2 | 1
(Australia) Helen Amos | 0 | 6 | 6
(United Kingdom) Wendy Hall | 2 | 6 | 6
(Japan) Junko Sawamatsu | 6 | 3 | 4

Qualifying competition
(Australia) Helen Amos | 6 | 6
(United Kingdom) Wendy Hall | 1 | 4

=== Seventh qualifier ===
First round
1 | (United Kingdom) Sandra Okin | 6 | 7
8 | (Australia) Sue Hole | 3 | 5
4 | (Australia) Jenny Staley Hoad | 6 | 6
5 | (United Kingdom) Peppy Munslow | 4 | 2
2 | (United Kingdom) Ruth Illingworth | 8 | 6
7 | (Chile) Maria Ayala | 6 | 3
3 | (United Kingdom) Jill Cooper | 4 | 3
6 | (United States) Constance Jaster | 6 | 6

Second round
(United Kingdom) Sandra Okin | 1 | 6 | 1
(Australia) Jenny Staley Hoad | 6 | 4 | 6
(United Kingdom) Ruth Illingworth | 4 | 6 | 7
(United States) Constance Jaster | 6 | 0 | 5

Qualifying competition
(Australia) Jenny Staley Hoad | 6 | 6
(United Kingdom) Ruth Illingworth | 4 | 1

=== Eighth qualifier ===
First round
1 | (Sweden) Madelaine Pegel | 2 | 1
8 | (United Kingdom) Janet Ward | 6 | 6
4 | (South Africa) S.E. Stott | 6 | 4 | 6
5 | (United Kingdom) J.E. McFarlane | 0 | 6 | 1
2 | (United States) Marilyn Aschner | 6 | 6
7 | (United Kingdom) Vivienne Dennis | 1 | 2
3 | (Colombia) Paola Palacios | 2 | 2
6 | (United Kingdom) Sue Morgan | 6 | 6

Second round
(United Kingdom) Janet Ward | 3 | 6 | 6
(South Africa) S.E. Stott | 6 | 4 | 2
(United States) Marilyn Aschner | 6 | 6
(United Kingdom) Sue Morgan | 1 | 3

Qualifying competition
(United Kingdom) Janet Ward | 6 | 3 | 0
(United States) Marilyn Aschner | 4 | 6 | 6
