= 1973 Tanglewood International Tennis Classic =

- Date: August 6–12
- Edition: 3rd
- Category: Grand Prix (Group C)
- Draw: 32S / 16D
- Prize money: $25,000
- Surface: Clay / outdoor
- Location: Clemmons, North Carolina, United States
- Venue: Tanglewood Park

Champions

Singles
- (Chile) Jaime Fillol

Doubles
- (Australia) Bob Carmichael / (South Africa) Frew McMillan
- Tanglewood International Tennis Classic

The 1973 Tanglewood International Tennis Classic was a men's tennis tournament held at Tanglewood Park in Clemmons, North Carolina in the United States that was part of the Grand Prix circuit and categorized as a Group C event. The tournament was played on outdoor clay courts and was held from August 6 until August 12, 1973. It was the third and last edition of the tournament. Second-seeded Jaime Fillol won the singles title, his second at the event after 1971, and earned $5,000 first-prize money.

== Finals ==
=== Singles ===
(Chile) Jaime Fillol defeated (United Kingdom) Gerald Battrick 6–2, 6–4

- It was Fillol's 1st singles title of the year and the 3rd of his career.

=== Doubles ===
(Australia) Bob Carmichael / (South Africa) Frew McMillan defeated (New Zealand) Brian Fairlie / (Egypt) Ismail El Shafei 6–3, 6–4
