= 1968 Wimbledon Championships – Mixed doubles =

Mixed doubles
- 1968 Wimbledon Championships

Final
- Champions: (Australia) Ken Fletcher (Australia) Margaret Court
- Runners-up: (Soviet Union) Alex Metreveli (Soviet Union) Olga Morozova
- Score: 6–1, 14–12

Details
- Draw: 80 (4Q)
- Seeds: 4

Events
Singles	men	women		boys	girls
Doubles	men	women	mixed	boys	girls
- Wimbledon Championships

Owen Davidson and Billie Jean King were the defending champions, but lost in the semifinals to Ken Fletcher and Margaret Court.

Fletcher and Court defeated Alex Metreveli and Olga Morozova in the final, 6–1, 14–12 to win the mixed doubles tennis title at the 1968 Wimbledon Championships.

== Seeds ==
1. (Australia) Owen Davidson / (United States) Billie Jean King (semifinals)
2. (United States) Pancho Gonzales / (United States) Rosie Casals (quarterfinals)
3. (Australia) Fred Stolle / (United Kingdom) Ann Jones (semifinals)
4. (Australia) Ken Fletcher / (Australia) Margaret Court (champions)

Click on the seed number of a player to go to their draw section.

== Draw ==
Key

- Q = Qualifier
- WC = Wild card
- LL = Lucky loser
- Alt = Alternate
- ITF = ITF entry
- PR = Protected ranking
- SR = Special ranking
- SE = Special exempt
- JE = Junior exempt
- JR = Junior Accelerator Programme entrant
- CO = College Accelerator Programme entrant
- NG = Next Gen Accelerator Program entrant
- w/o = Walkover
- r = Retired
- d = Defaulted

=== Finals ===
Quarterfinals
1	(Australia) Owen Davidson (United States) Billie Jean King	7	6
(Australia) Bill Bowrey (Australia) Lesley Bowrey	5	2
4	(Australia) Ken Fletcher (Australia) Margaret Court	6	6
(South Africa) Frew McMillan (South Africa) Annette du Plooy	2	4
(Denmark) Torben Ulrich (United States) Julie Heldman	6	2
3	(Australia) Fred Stolle (United Kingdom) Ann Jones	8	6
(Soviet Union) Alex Metreveli (Soviet Union) Olga Morozova	6	6
2	(United States) Pancho Gonzales (United States) Rosie Casals	2	4

Semifinals
1	(Australia) Owen Davidson (United States) Billie Jean King	4	7
4	(Australia) Ken Fletcher (Australia) Margaret Court	6	9
3	(Australia) Fred Stolle (United Kingdom) Ann Jones	3	10
(Soviet Union) Alex Metreveli (Soviet Union) Olga Morozova	6	12

Final
4	(Australia) Ken Fletcher (Australia) Margaret Court	6	14
(Soviet Union) Alex Metreveli (Soviet Union) Olga Morozova	1	12

=== Top half ===
==== Section 1 ====
First round

Second round
1	(Australia) O Davidson (United States) BJ King	7	6
(United States) R Barth (United States) V Rogers	5	4
Q	(Australia) B White (United Kingdom) M Lee	5	3
(United Kingdom) S Matthews (United Kingdom) P Roberts	7	6
(Belgium) E Drossart (Belgium) C Mercelis	6	6
Q	(South Africa) M Baleson (United Kingdom) H Allen	2	4
(Australia) J Moore (Australia) F Moore	w/o
(Soviet Union) T Leius (Soviet Union) G Baksheeva

Third round
1	(Australia) O Davidson (United States) BJ King	6	6
(United Kingdom) S Matthews (United Kingdom) P Roberts	2	1
(Belgium) E Drossart (Belgium) C Mercelis	1	2
(Australia) J Moore (Australia) F Moore	6	6

Fourth round
1	(Australia) O Davidson (United States) BJ King	6	6
(Australia) J Moore (Australia) F Moore	4	2

==== Section 2 ====
First round

Second round
(South Africa) R Summers (South Africa) L Rossouw	w/o
(France) P Darmon (France) R Darmon
(Australia) R Ruffels (Australia) K Krantzcke	6	6
(United States) M Riessen (Australia) J Tegart	3	4
(Australia) J Alexander (Australia) K Harris	6	4	2
(Australia) W Bowrey (Australia) L Bowrey	2	6	6
(France) R Haillet (United Kingdom) L Greville-Collins
(Brazil) T Koch (Brazil) S Petersen	w/o

Third round
(South Africa) R Summers (South Africa) L Rossouw	2	1
(Australia) R Ruffels (Australia) K Krantzcke	6	6
(Australia) W Bowrey (Australia) L Bowrey	6	4	7
(Brazil) T Koch (Brazil) S Petersen	3	6	5

Fourth round
(Australia) R Ruffels (Australia) K Krantzcke	6	4	5
(Australia) W Bowrey (Australia) L Bowrey	3	6	7

==== Section 3 ====
First round

Second round
4	(Australia) K Fletcher (Australia) M Court	4	6	6
(Brazil) JE Mandarino (Spain) C Mandarino	6	4	2
(Australia) T Addison (United States) V Ziegenfuss	10	6
(South Africa) Q Pretorius (Rhodesia) P Walkden	8	2
(United Kingdom) R Taylor (United Kingdom) F MacLennan	6	3	6
Q	(Mexico) J Subirats (Mexico) E Subirats	4	6	2
(New Zealand) O Parun (Australia) C Sherriff	4	6	16
(South Africa) A Segal (Australia) J Hoad	6	4	14

Third round
4	(Australia) K Fletcher (Australia) M Court	6	6
(Australia) T Addison (United States) V Ziegenfuss	3	4
(United Kingdom) R Taylor (United Kingdom) F MacLennan	6	6
(New Zealand) O Parun (Australia) C Sherriff	3	2

Fourth round
4	(Australia) K Fletcher (Australia) M Court	8	6
(United Kingdom) R Taylor (United Kingdom) F MacLennan	6	2

==== Section 4 ====
First round
(Australia) B Phillips-Moore (Australia) A Phillips-Moore	5	9
(Belgium) C De Gronckel (Belgium) I Loeys	7	11
(Australia) K Hiskins (United Kingdom) E Ernest	1	3
(Australia) R Howe (United Kingdom) V Wade	6	6
(West Germany) H-J Pohmann (Netherlands) L Jansen Venneboer	6	6
(United Kingdom) K Wooldridge (United Kingdom) J Williams	3	1
(United Kingdom) J Barrett (United Kingdom) A Barrett	3	6	1
(United States) D Dell (South Africa) H Segal	6	4	6
(Australia) G Primrose (United Kingdom) R Lloyd	3	4
(United States) S Smith (United States) D Hart	6	6
Q	(Chile) L Ayala (Chile) M Ayala	6	6
(United Kingdom) A Mills (United Kingdom) J Mills	4	4
(South Africa) F McMillan (South Africa) A du Plooy	6	7
(United Kingdom) G Stilwell (United Kingdom) E Truman	1	5
(South Africa) R Maud (Australia) H Amos	4	7	6
(Australia) P Dent (Australia) L Hunt	6	5	3

Second round
(Belgium) C De Gronckel (Belgium) I Loeys	0	0
(Australia) R Howe (United Kingdom) V Wade	6	6
(West Germany) H-J Pohmann (Netherlands) L Jansen Venneboer	6	1	6
(United States) D Dell (South Africa) H Segal	4	6	4
(United States) S Smith (United States) D Hart	6	6
Q	(Chile) L Ayala (Chile) M Ayala	4	4
(South Africa) F McMillan (South Africa) A du Plooy	6	6
(South Africa) R Maud (Australia) H Amos	4	3

Third round
(Australia) R Howe (United Kingdom) V Wade	3	6	6
(West Germany) H-J Pohmann (Netherlands) L Jansen Venneboer	6	2	0
(United States) S Smith (United States) D Hart	3	10
(South Africa) F McMillan (South Africa) A du Plooy	6	12

Fourth round
(Australia) R Howe (United Kingdom) V Wade	3	4
(South Africa) F McMillan (South Africa) A du Plooy	6	6

=== Bottom half ===
==== Section 5 ====
First round
(United Kingdom) M Davies (West Germany) E Buding	7	3	3
(Denmark) T Ulrich (United States) J Heldman	5	6	6
(Soviet Union) V Korotkov (Czechoslovakia) J Volavková	6	6
(Greece) N Kalogeropoulos (Greece) C-A Kalogeropoulos	1	4
(West Germany) H-J Plötz (West Germany) C Schediwy	w/o
(United States) G Mulloy (United States) J Bartkowicz
(Chile) J Pinto Bravo (Sweden) C Sandberg	9	6
(Belgium) P Hombergen (France) É Terras	7	4
(France) J-B Chanfreau (Australia) G Sherriff	4	6	6
(United States) W Tym (United States) A Tym	6	3	2
(United Kingdom) P Curtis (United States) M-A Eisel	6	6
(United States) R Anderson (United States) C Martinez	1	4
(United States) A Neely (United States) P Lamm	9	3	12
(United Kingdom) C McHugo (United Kingdom) W Hall	7	6	14
(Denmark) J Leschly (France) J Lieffrig	6	2	4
(Canada) K Carpenter (Canada) V Berner	1	6	6

Second round
(Denmark) T Ulrich (United States) J Heldman	6	3	6
(Soviet Union) V Korotkov (Czechoslovakia) J Volavková	3	6	2
(West Germany) H-J Plötz (West Germany) C Schediwy	1	4
(Chile) J Pinto Bravo (Sweden) C Sandberg	6	6
(France) J-B Chanfreau (Australia) G Sherriff	6	2	3
(United Kingdom) P Curtis (United States) M-A Eisel	4	6	6
(United Kingdom) C McHugo (United Kingdom) W Hall	1	11	5
(Canada) K Carpenter (Canada) V Berner	6	9	7

Third round
(Denmark) T Ulrich (United States) J Heldman	6	6
(Chile) J Pinto Bravo (Sweden) C Sandberg	1	2
(United Kingdom) P Curtis (United States) M-A Eisel	4	13	6
(Canada) K Carpenter (Canada) V Berner	6	11	3

Fourth round
(Denmark) T Ulrich (United States) J Heldman	3	6	6
(United Kingdom) P Curtis (United States) M-A Eisel	6	3	4

==== Section 6 ====
First round

Second round
(United States) S Tidball (United States) S DeFina	6	4	6
(South Africa) D Schroder (South Africa) J Drysdale	2	6	8
(United Kingdom) J Clifton (United Kingdom) A Soady	5	6
(South Africa) R Moore (United States) K Harter	7	8
(United Kingdom) G Battrick (United Kingdom) W Shaw	6	6
(New Zealand) R Hawkes (United Kingdom) R Bentley	1	2
(United States) L Schloss (United States) K Pigeon	0	4
3	(Australia) F Stolle (United Kingdom) A Jones	6	6

Third round
(South Africa) D Schroder (South Africa) J Drysdale	5	4
(South Africa) R Moore (United States) K Harter	7	6
(United Kingdom) G Battrick (United Kingdom) W Shaw	3	4
3	(Australia) F Stolle (United Kingdom) A Jones	6	6

Fourth round
(South Africa) R Moore (United States) K Harter	3	2
3	(Australia) F Stolle (United Kingdom) A Jones	6	6

==== Section 7 ====
First round

Second round
(Sweden) L Ölander (Sweden) E Andersson	6	2	6
(Chile) P Rodríguez (Chile) M Rodríguez	4	6	8
(Soviet Union) A Metreveli (Soviet Union) O Morozova	6	12
(Spain) JL Arilla (Sweden) I Löfdahl	4	10
(Australia) R Carmichael (Australia) K Melville	6	6
(Soviet Union) S Likhachev (France) F Dürr	2	3
(United Arab Republic) I El Shafei (Sweden) E Lundquist	0	6	3
(Netherlands) T Okker (United States) N Richey	6	4	6

Third round
(Chile) P Rodríguez (Chile) M Rodríguez	3	2
(Soviet Union) A Metreveli (Soviet Union) O Morozova	6	6
(Australia) R Carmichael (Australia) K Melville	1	3
(Netherlands) T Okker (United States) N Richey	6	6

Fourth round
(Soviet Union) A Metreveli (Soviet Union) O Morozova	3	6	8
(Netherlands) T Okker (United States) N Richey	6	3	6

==== Section 8 ====
First round

Second round
(New Zealand) J McDonald (Canada) F Urban	7	7
(United Kingdom) M Cox (United Kingdom) A Cox	5	5
(United Kingdom) H Truman (United Kingdom) C Janes	1	6	5
(South Africa) G Garner (South Africa) M Godwin	6	1	7
(United Kingdom) G Bluett (United Kingdom) S Brasher	4	3
(Chile) P Cornejo (Australia) H Gourlay	6	6
(South Africa) G Forbes (South Africa) V Forbes	1	3
3	(United States) R Gonzales (United States) R Casals	6	6

Third round
(New Zealand) J McDonald (Canada) F Urban	2	6
(South Africa) G Garner (South Africa) M Godwin	6	8
(Chile) P Cornejo (Australia) H Gourlay	3	3
3	(United States) R Gonzales (United States) R Casals	6	6

Fourth round
(South Africa) G Garner (South Africa) M Godwin	6	5	3
3	(United States) R Gonzales (United States) R Casals	4	7	6
