= 1968 Wimbledon Championships – Men's singles =

Men's singles
- 1968 Wimbledon Championships

Final
- Champion: (Australia) Rod Laver
- Runner-up: (Australia) Tony Roche
- Score: 6–3, 6–4, 6–2

Details
- Draw: 128(10Q)
- Seeds: 16

Events
Singles	men	women		boys	girls
Doubles	men	women	mixed	boys	girls
- Wimbledon Championships

Rod Laver defeated Tony Roche in the final, 6–3, 6–4, 6–2 to win the gentlemen's singles tennis title at the 1968 Wimbledon Championships. It was his third Wimbledon singles title and seventh Grand Slam tournament singles title overall. It was the first edition of Wimbledon open to professional tennis players, marking a period in tennis history known as the Open Era.

John Newcombe was the defending champion, but was defeated in the fourth round by Arthur Ashe.

== Seeds ==
1. (Australia) Rod Laver (champion)
2. (Australia) Ken Rosewall (fourth round)
3. (Spain) Andrés Gimeno (third round)
4. (Australia) John Newcombe (fourth round)
5. (Australia) Roy Emerson (fourth round)
6. (Spain) Manuel Santana (third round)
7. (Australia) Lew Hoad (third round)
8. (United States) Pancho Gonzales (third round)
9. (United States) Dennis Ralston (quarterfinals)
10. (United States) Butch Buchholz (quarterfinals)
11. (Australia) Fred Stolle (fourth round)
12. (Netherlands) Tom Okker (quarterfinals)
13. (United States) Arthur Ashe (semifinals)
14. (South Africa) Cliff Drysdale (third round)
15. (Australia) Tony Roche (final)
16. (Socialist Federal Republic of Yugoslavia) Nikola Pilić (first round)

Click on the seed number of a player to go to their draw section.

== Draw ==
Key

- Q = Qualifier
- WC = Wild card
- LL = Lucky loser
- Alt = Alternate
- ITF = ITF entry
- PR = Protected ranking
- SR = Special ranking
- SE = Special exempt
- JE = Junior exempt
- JR = Junior Accelerator Programme entrant
- CO = College Accelerator Programme entrant
- NG = Next Gen Accelerator Program entrant
- w/o = Walkover
- r = Retired
- d = Defaulted

=== Finals ===
Quarterfinals
1	(Australia) Rod Laver	4	6	6	4	6
9	(United States) Dennis Ralston	6	3	1	6	2
13	(United States) Arthur Ashe	7	9	9	6
12	(Netherlands) Tom Okker	9	7	7	2
(United States) Clark Graebner	6	6	9
(South Africa) Raymond Moore	2	0	7
10	(United States) Butch Buchholz	6	5	4	4
15	(Australia) Tony Roche	3	7	6	6

Semifinals
1	(Australia) Rod Laver	7	6	6
13	(United States) Arthur Ashe	5	2	4
(United States) Clark Graebner	7	10	4	6
15	(Australia) Tony Roche	9	8	6	8

Final
1	(Australia) Rod Laver	6	6	6
15	(Australia) Tony Roche	3	4	2

=== Top half ===
==== Section 1 ====
First round
1	(Australia) Rod Laver	6	4	6	6
(United States) Gene Scott	3	6	3	2
(Italy) Giuseppe Merlo	4	3	0
(United States) Stan Smith	6	6	6
(Czechoslovakia) Jan Kodeš	2	3	2
(United States) Marty Riessen	6	6	6
(United States) Donald Dell	6	3	4	4
(New Zealand) Brian Fairlie	3	6	6	6
16	(Socialist Federal Republic of Yugoslavia) Nikola Pilić	6	5	3	2
(United States) Herb Fitzgibbon	3	7	6	6
(United Kingdom) Mark Cox	7	8	6	6
(South Africa) Gordon Forbes	9	6	3	4
(United Kingdom) Roger Becker	2	4	5
(United States) Allen Fox	6	6	7
(France) Daniel Contet	3	7	7	7	6
Q	(Pakistan) Haroon Rahim	6	5	5	9	2

Second round
1	(Australia) R Laver	6	6	6
(United States) S Smith	3	4	4
(United States) M Riessen
(New Zealand) B Fairlie	w/o
(United States) H Fitzgibbon	6	3	9	7	10
(United Kingdom) M Cox	4	6	7	9	12
(United States) A Fox	w/o
(France) D Contet

Third round
1	(Australia) R Laver	6	3	7	6
(United States) M Riessen	4	6	5	3
(United Kingdom) M Cox	6	6	6
(France) D Contet	3	4	4

Fourth round
1	(Australia) R Laver	9	5	6	6
(United Kingdom) M Cox	7	7	2	0

==== Section 2 ====
First round
8	(United States) Pancho Gonzales	6	6	6
(India) Ramanathan Krishnan	2	4	3
(South Africa) Bob Maud	6	6	6
Q	(South Africa) Derek Schroder	3	2	2
(Soviet Union) Alex Metreveli	6	6	4	10
(Spain) Manuel Orantes	2	2	6	8
(France) Patrice Beust	4	6	6	7
(Australia) Phil Dent	6	3	4	5
9	(United States) Dennis Ralston	6	7	8
Q	(Australia) John Brown	1	5	6
(United States) Cliff Richey	6	8	7
(Australia) Barry Phillips-Moore	2	6	5
(Denmark) Jan Leschly	6	3	8	6
(Australia) Colin Stubs	2	6	6	1
(Brazil) José Edison Mandarino	6	7	2	6
(Mexico) Antonio Palafox	3	5	6	4

Second round
8	(United States) R Gonzales	6	6	9
(South Africa) R Maud	2	4	7
(Soviet Union) A Metreveli	6	6	6
(France) P Beust	1	1	1
9	(United States) D Ralston	6	3	7	6	13
(United States) C Richey	3	6	9	3	11
(Denmark) J Leschly	9	8	3
(Brazil) JE Mandarino	11	10	6

Third round
8	(United States) R Gonzales	6	4	3	5
(Soviet Union) A Metreveli	4	6	6	7
9	(United States) D Ralston	6	6	6
(Brazil) JE Mandarino	2	4	2

Fourth round
(Soviet Union) A Metreveli	3	5	2
9	(United States) D Ralston	6	7	6

==== Section 3 ====
First round
4	(Australia) John Newcombe	4	6	6	6
(Australia) Owen Davidson	6	3	4	3
(South Africa) Frew McMillan	7	7	3	7
(Australia) John Alexander	5	9	6	9
Q	(United Kingdom) David Lloyd	6	6	10	6
(France) Pierre Darmon	4	4	12	1
(United Kingdom) Keith Wooldridge	4	4	6	6	6
Q	(South Africa) Terry Ryan	6	6	4	2	8
13	(United States) Arthur Ashe	6	6	6
Q	(Ecuador) Eduardo Zuleta	1	2	3
(India) Premjit Lall	4	4	6	2
(United Arab Republic) Ismail El Shafei	6	6	3	6
(Australia) Warren Jacques	1	4	2
(Sweden) Ove Bengtson	6	6	6
(Canada) Keith Carpenter	4	4	13	3
(Spain) José Luis Arilla	6	6	11	6

Second round
4	(Australia) J Newcombe	6	6	6
(Australia) J Alexander	1	4	3
Q	(United Kingdom) D Lloyd	6	3	0	6	7
Q	(South Africa) T Ryan	4	6	6	3	5
13	(United States) A Ashe	6	6	9
(United Arab Republic) I El Shafei	1	2	7
(Sweden) O Bengtson	6	5	6	3	12
(Spain) JL Arilla	0	7	4	6	10

Third round
4	(Australia) J Newcombe	7	6	6
Q	(United Kingdom) D Lloyd	5	0	1
13	(United States) A Ashe	11	6	6
(Sweden) O Bengtson	9	4	1

Fourth round
4	(Australia) J Newcombe	4	4	6	6	3
13	(United States) A Ashe	6	6	4	1	6

==== Section 4 ====
First round
5	(Australia) Roy Emerson	6	6	6
(United States) Ronnie Holmberg	2	2	4
(Jamaica) Richard Russell	5	2	6
(Romania) Ion Țiriac	7	6	8
(United States) Jim McManus	4	6	1	3
(Australia) Ken Fletcher	6	2	6	6
(Chile) Patricio Rodríguez	10	5	3
(United States) Alex Olmedo	12	7	6
12	(Netherlands) Tom Okker	7	3	6	6
(United Kingdom) Peter Curtis	5	6	2	2
(United Kingdom) Mike Sangster	6	6	6
(Brazil) Carlos Fernandes	0	4	4
Q	(United Kingdom) Stanley Matthews	4	9	4	4
(Soviet Union) Vladimir Korotkov	6	7	6	6
(Chile) Luis Ayala	11	2	4	6
(France) Pierre Barthès	9	6	6	8

Second round
5	(Australia) R Emerson	5	6	6	6
(Romania) I Țiriac	7	1	2	0
(Australia) K Fletcher	4	7	4	3
(United States) A Olmedo	6	5	6	6
12	(Netherlands) T Okker	6	6	7
(United Kingdom) M Sangster	3	0	5
(Soviet Union) V Korotkov	2	7	4	7	7
(France) P Barthès	6	5	6	5	5

Third round
5	(Australia) R Emerson	7	6	6
(United States) A Olmedo	5	1	1
12	(Netherlands) T Okker	8	6	6	6
(Soviet Union) V Korotkov	10	2	1	2

Fourth round
5	(Australia) R Emerson	3	11	5	5
12	(Netherlands) T Okker	6	9	7	7

=== Bottom half ===
==== Section 5 ====
First round
(France) Robert Haillet	9	3	2
(Australia) Terry Addison	11	6	6
LL	(Argentina) Raúl Peralta	1	4	3
(Greece) Nicholas Kalogeropoulos	6	6	6
(United Kingdom) Gerald Battrick	4	6	5
(Australia) Bob Howe	6	8	7
(France) Jean-Claude Barclay	1	2	2
11	(Australia) Fred Stolle	6	6	6
(United States) Clark Graebner	6	6	6	6	11
(United States) Roy Barth	4	3	8	8	9
(Japan) Koji Watanabe	2	4	5
(Denmark) Jørgen Ulrich	6	6	7
(Soviet Union) Sergei Likhachev	6	7	2	1	2
(United Kingdom) Graham Stilwell	3	5	6	6	6
(West Germany) Hans-Joachim Plötz	0	4	2
6	(Spain) Manuel Santana	6	6	6

Second round
(Australia) T Addison	4	6	3	6	6
(Greece) N Kalogeropoulos	6	1	6	4	3
(Australia) R Howe	1	1	1
11	(Australia) F Stolle	6	6	6
(United States) C Graebner	6	6	6
(Denmark) J Ulrich	2	0	4
(United Kingdom) G Stilwell	7	8	0	4
6	(Spain) M Santana	5	10	6	6

Third round
(Australia) T Addison	3	6	2
11	(Australia) F Stolle	6	8	6
(United States) C Graebner	9	6	6
6	(Spain) M Santana	7	2	1

Fourth round
11	(Australia) F Stolle	1	5	5
(United States) C Graebner	6	7	7

==== Section 6 ====
First round
(United States) Tom Edlefsen	6	7	7
Q	(West Germany) Jürgen Fassbender	2	5	5
(Italy) Nicola Pietrangeli	4	2	6	6	4
Q	(United Kingdom) Geoffrey Bluett	6	6	2	2	6
(South Africa) Graydon Garner	2	6	6	7
LL	(Jamaica) Lance Lumsden	6	2	4	5
(United Kingdom) Bobby Wilson	7	3	2
14	(South Africa) Cliff Drysdale	9	6	6
(Czechoslovakia) Jan Kukal	3	4	2
(Australia) Dick Crealy	6	6	6
(South Africa) Ray Moore	6	6	9
(Socialist Federal Republic of Yugoslavia) Nikola Špear	1	2	7
(Poland) Wiesław Gąsiorek	3	1	5
(Australia) Bill Bowrey	6	6	7
(Hungary) István Gulyás	3	5	4
3	(Spain) Andrés Gimeno	6	7	6

Second round
(United States) T Edlefsen	7	4	6	6
Q	(United Kingdom) G Bluett	5	6	1	2
(South Africa) G Garner	2	5	6
14	(South Africa) C Drysdale	6	7	8
(Australia) R Crealy	6	5	3	4
(South Africa) R Moore	3	7	6	6
(Australia) W Bowrey	2	6	7	3
3	(Spain) A Gimeno	6	4	9	6

Third round
(United States) T Edlefsen	9	4	1	6	6
14	(South Africa) C Drysdale	7	6	6	4	4
(South Africa) R Moore	4	6	7	2	6
3	(Spain) A Gimeno	6	3	5	6	2

Fourth round
(United States) T Edlefsen	4	6	1	6	4
(South Africa) R Moore	6	2	6	3	6

==== Section 7 ====
First round
LL	(Colombia) Pancho Castillo	7	4	2
(France) Georges Goven	9	6	6
(Soviet Union) Toomas Leius	6	1	8	2
(Denmark) Torben Ulrich	4	6	10	6
(Czechoslovakia) Milan Holeček	8	6	4	2	5
(Australia) Bob Carmichael	6	4	6	6	7
(Australia) Allan Stone	4	2	12	4
10	(United States) Butch Buchholz	6	6	10	6
(South Africa) Bob Hewitt	6	8	6
(United Kingdom) John Barrett	3	6	4
(Brazil) Thomaz Koch	6	6	11	6
(Italy) Gaetano Di Maso	3	2	13	0
(Ecuador) Pancho Guzmán	11	1	8	6	6
(United States) Bob Lutz	13	6	6	3	4
(India) Jaidip Mukerjea	3	4	2
7	(Australia) Lew Hoad	6	6	6

Second round
(France) G Goven	3	3	6
(Denmark) T Ulrich	6	6	8
(Australia) R Carmichael	13	4	4	6	2
10	(United States) E Buchholz	11	6	6	1	6
(South Africa) R Hewitt	3	6	3	6	12
(Brazil) T Koch	6	4	6	3	10
(Ecuador) F Guzmán	6	1	4
7	(Australia) L Hoad	8	6	6

Third round
(Denmark) T Ulrich	7	2	3	1
10	(United States) E Buchholz	5	6	6	6
(South Africa) R Hewitt	6	9	1	6	6
7	(Australia) L Hoad	3	11	6	3	3

Fourth round
10	(United States) E Buchholz	6	3	6	6
(South Africa) R Hewitt	4	6	2	2

==== Section 8 ====
First round
LL	(United Kingdom) Clay Iles	7	3	6	7
(France) Jean-Pierre Courcol	5	6	3	5
(Chile) Patricio Cornejo	2	1	2
(Australia) Ray Ruffels	6	6	6
(United States) Jim Osborne	4	7	10	6	6
(United Kingdom) Mike Davies	6	9	8	1	3
(Australia) Ray Keldie	3	1	5
15	(Australia) Tony Roche	6	6	7
(United Kingdom) Paul Hutchins	3	7	10
(New Zealand) Onny Parun	6	9	12
(United Kingdom) Alan Mills	4	2	3
(United Kingdom) Roger Taylor	6	6	6
(United States) Charlie Pasarell	6	7	3	6
Q	(Belgium) Patrick Hombergen	3	5	6	3
(South Africa) Abe Segal	3	4	4
2	(Australia) Ken Rosewall	6	6	6

Second round
LL	(United Kingdom) C Iles	4	2	3
(Australia) R Ruffels	6	6	6
(United States) J Osborne	4	0	2
15	(Australia) A Roche	6	6	6
(New Zealand) O Parun	2	3	14	6	6
(United Kingdom) R Taylor	6	6	12	4	4
(United States) C Pasarell	9	1	8	2	3
2	(Australia) K Rosewall	7	6	6	6	6

Third round
(Australia) R Ruffels	4	1	3
15	(Australia) A Roche	6	6	6
(New Zealand) O Parun	4	6	3	2
2	(Australia) K Rosewall	6	3	6	6

Fourth round
15	(Australia) A Roche	9	6	6
2	(Australia) K Rosewall	7	3	2

Preceded by 1968 French Open	Grand Slams; Men's Singles	Succeeded by 1968 U.S. Open
