= North Carolina Wine Festival =

Festival

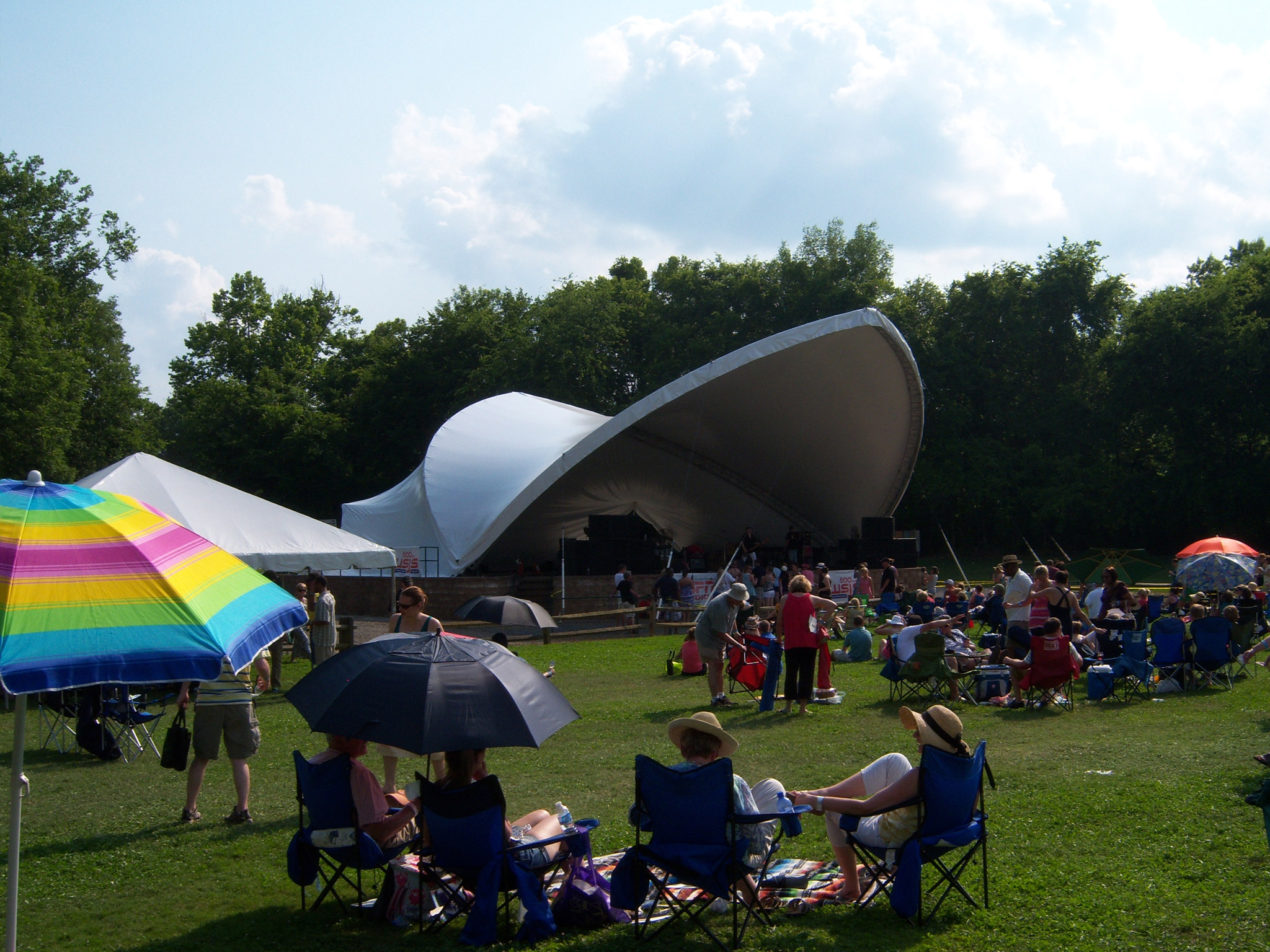
Live entertainment

The North Carolina Wine Festival is one of several annual events showcasing vineyards from all across the state of North Carolina. It is the largest one-day wine festival in the state. It began in 2001 as a way to showcase the over 100 different wineries in the state. It was held at Tanglewood Park, in Clemmons, North Carolina. The 20th annual festival will be held on 16 October 2021 and have over 30 participating wineries; there was no event in 2020 as the COVID-19 pandemic was to blame. The general manager for WSJS-AM, Tom Hamilton, is also the festival director.

More than just a wine-tasting, the event features many bands, activities, food and apparel vendors. Attendance in 2012 was estimated to be between 12,000 and 15,000 people.

Revenue from wineries produces over $1.2 billion in annual sales, making North Carolina the 10th largest U.S. state in wine production. North Carolina is the world's largest producer of muscadine wines.

== 2005 split ==
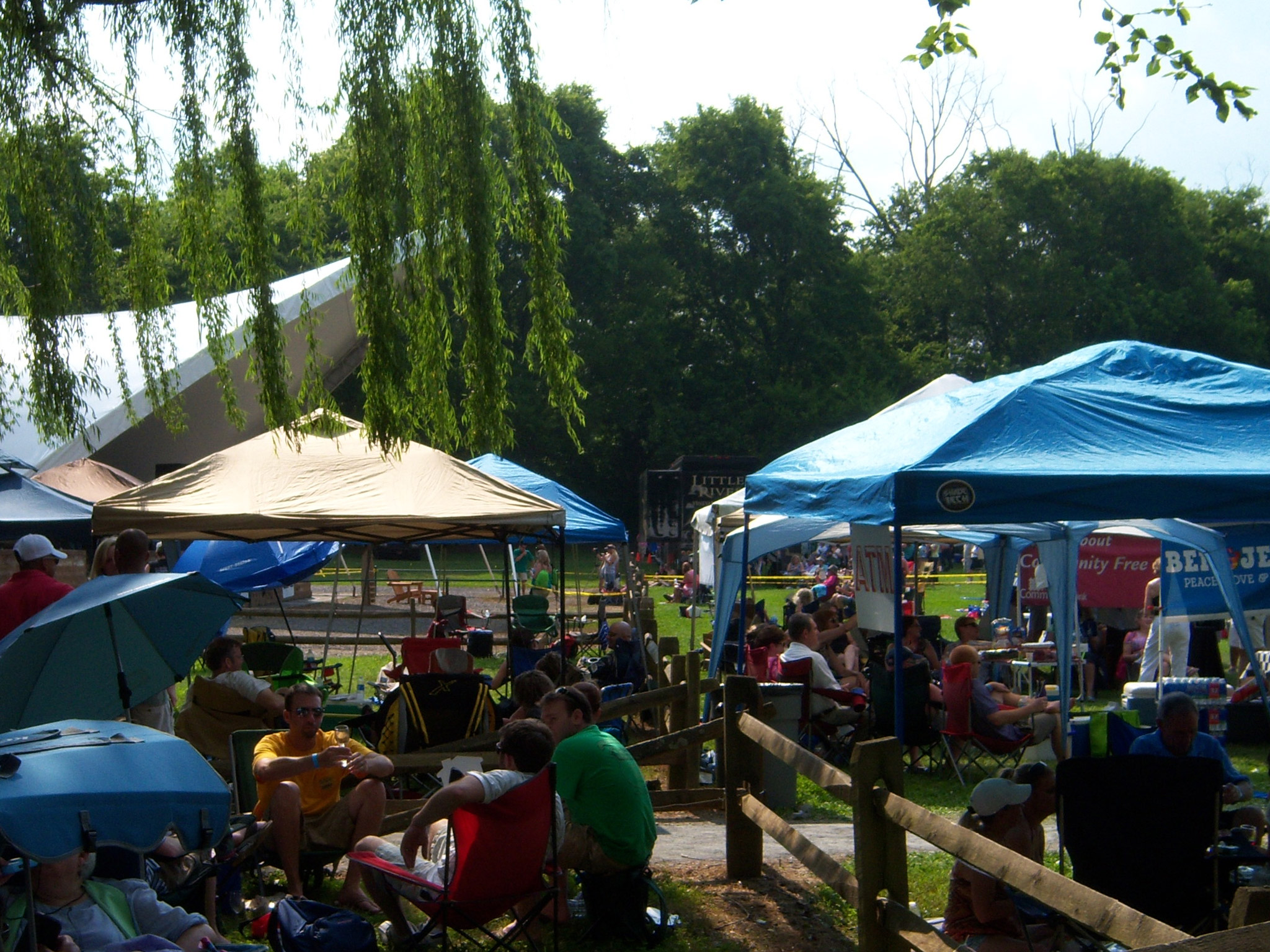
Attendees bring their own lawn chairs and canopies.

In 2005, several wineries from the Yadkin Valley AVA withdrew from the event, citing low sales and limited exposure compared to other events and activities at the festival. The Yadkin Valley Winegrowers Association subsequently organized their own festival, held shortly after the NC Wine Festival.
