= Pieter Soeters =

Dutch tennis player

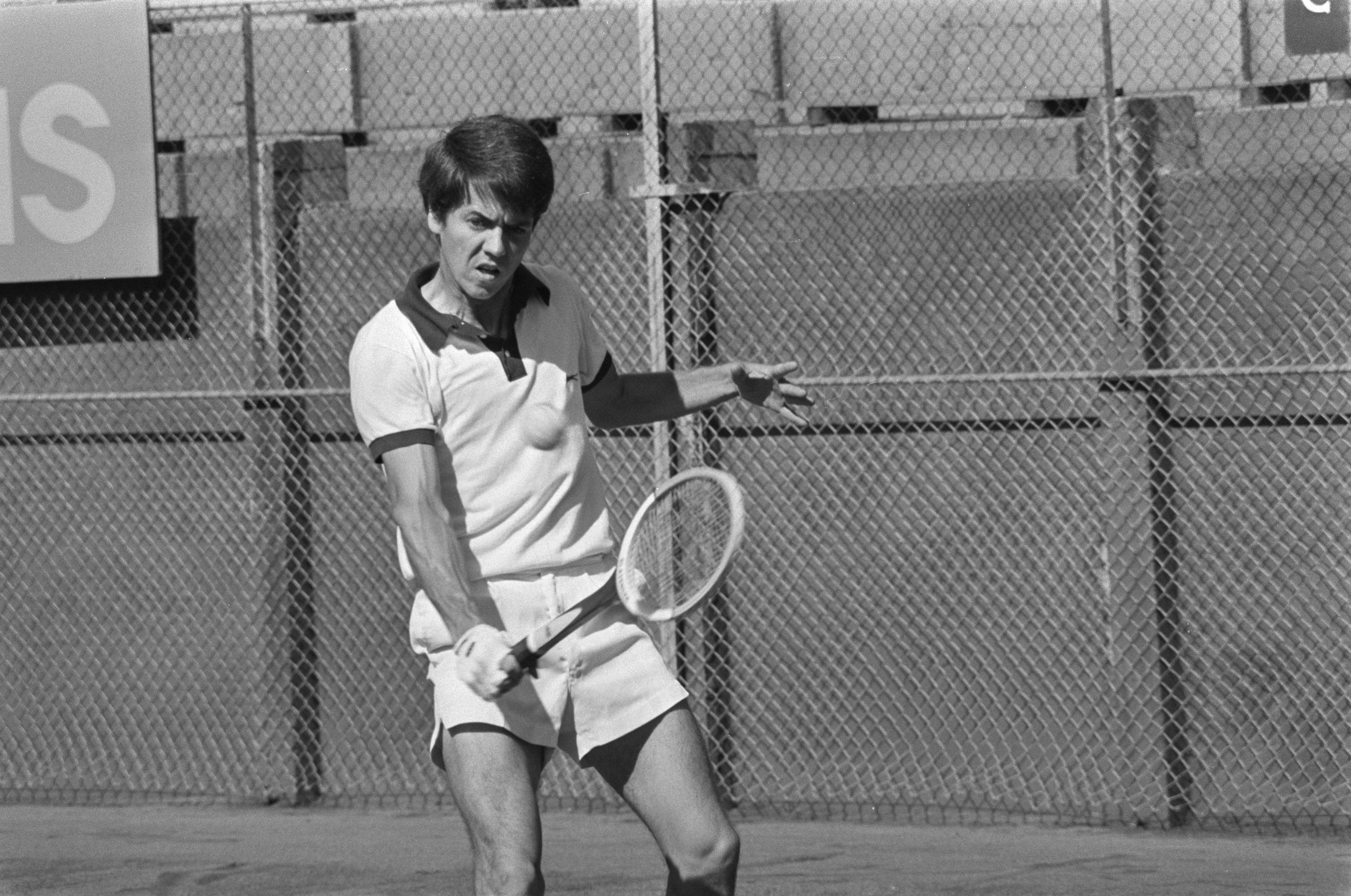
- Country (sports): Netherlands
- Born: 26 May 1947 (age 77); Pontianak, Dutch East Indies
- Plays: Right-handed

Singles

Grand Slam singles results
- Wimbledon: Q2 (1968)

Doubles

Grand Slam doubles results
- Wimbledon: Q2 (1968)

Pieter Soeters (born 26 May 1947) is a Dutch former professional tennis player.

Born in the Dutch East Indies, Soeters was based out of South Holland and won multiple national championships in junior tennis. Ranked as high as second nationally, he won the Dutch indoor championship title in 1970.

Soeters appeared for the Netherlands Davis Cup team in a 1970 tie against Greece in Athens and also represented his country in the Universiade, while studying engineering at Delft University.

== See also ==
- List of Netherlands Davis Cup team representatives
