= 1968 Wimbledon Championships – Men's doubles =

Men's doubles
- 1968 Wimbledon Championships

Final
- Champions: (Australia) John Newcombe (Australia) Tony Roche
- Runners-up: (Australia) Ken Rosewall (Australia) Fred Stolle
- Score: 3–6, 8–6, 5–7, 14–12, 6–3

Details
- Draw: 64 (4Q)
- Seeds: 8

Events
Singles	men	women		boys	girls
Doubles	men	women	mixed	boys	girls
- Wimbledon Championships

Bob Hewitt and Frew McMillan were the defending champions, but lost in the semifinals to Ken Rosewall and Fred Stolle.

John Newcombe and Tony Roche beat Rosewall and Stolle in the final, 3–6, 8–6, 5–7, 14–12, 6–3 to win the gentlemen's doubles title at the 1968 Wimbledon Championships.

== Seeds ==
1. (Australia) Roy Emerson / (Australia) Rod Laver (semifinals)
2. (Australia) Ken Rosewall / (Australia) Fred Stolle (final)
3. (Spain) Andrés Gimeno / (United States) Pancho Gonzales (third round)
4. (Australia) John Newcombe / (Australia) Tony Roche (champions)
5. (United States) Butch Buchholz / (United States) Dennis Ralston (quarterfinals)
6. (South Africa) Bob Hewitt / (South Africa) Frew McMillan (semifinals)
7. (Netherlands) Tom Okker / (United States) Marty Riessen (first round)
8. (South Africa) Cliff Drysdale / (United Kingdom) Roger Taylor (quarterfinals)

Click on the seed number of a player to go to their draw section.

== Draw ==
Key

- Q = Qualifier
- WC = Wild card
- LL = Lucky loser
- Alt = Alternate
- ITF = ITF entry
- PR = Protected ranking
- SR = Special ranking
- SE = Special exempt
- JE = Junior exempt
- JR = Junior Accelerator Programme entrant
- CO = College Accelerator Programme entrant
- NG = Next Gen Accelerator Program entrant
- w/o = Walkover
- r = Retired
- d = Defaulted

=== Finals ===
Quarterfinals
1	(Australia) Roy Emerson (Australia) Rod Laver	6	8	6
8	(South Africa) Cliff Drysdale (United Kingdom) Roger Taylor	4	6	3
4	(Australia) John Newcombe (Australia) Tony Roche	w/o
5	(United States) Butch Buchholz (United States) Dennis Ralston
6	(South Africa) Bob Hewitt (South Africa) Frew McMillan	0	6	6	3	8
(United States) Arthur Ashe (United States) Charlie Pasarell	6	2	4	6	5
(Australia) Ken Fletcher (Spain) Manuel Santana	1	1	4
2	(Australia) Ken Rosewall (Australia) Fred Stolle	6	6	6

Semifinals
1	(Australia) Roy Emerson (Australia) Rod Laver	3	6	6	5
4	(Australia) John Newcombe (Australia) Tony Roche	6	8	2	7
6	(South Africa) Bob Hewitt (South Africa) Frew McMillan	2	3	4
2	(Australia) Ken Rosewall (Australia) Fred Stolle	6	6	6

Final
4	(Australia) John Newcombe (Australia) Tony Roche	3	8	5	14	6
2	(Australia) Ken Rosewall (Australia) Fred Stolle	6	6	7	12	3

=== Top half ===
==== Section 1 ====
First round
1	(Australia) R Emerson (Australia) R Laver	6	6	6
(Australia) P Dent (Australia) R Giltinan	4	3	2
(United Kingdom) M Cox (United Kingdom) R Wilson	6	5	6	8
(Jamaica) L Lumsden (Jamaica) R Russell	2	7	3	6
(United Kingdom) G Battrick (United Kingdom) P Hutchins	6	4	7	7
(Canada) K Carpenter (Australia) B Geraghty	2	6	5	5
(United States) J McManus (United States) C Richey	6	6	11
LL	(United States) J Dewitts (Sweden) L Ölander	3	4	9
8	(South Africa) C Drysdale (United Kingdom) R Taylor	6	4	12	6
(Australia) W Bowrey (Australia) R Ruffels	2	6	10	1
(Australia) T Addison (Australia) R Keldie	6	3	4	7	2
(Denmark) J Leschly (Denmark) T Ulrich	3	6	6	5	6
(South Africa) G Forbes (South Africa) A Segal	8	9	8
(Chile) L Ayala (Hungary) I Gulyás	6	7	6
(Sweden) O Bengtson (Denmark) J Ulrich
(United States) A Olmedo (United States) P Segura	w/o

Second round
1	(Australia) R Emerson (Australia) R Laver	6	6	6
(United Kingdom) M Cox (United Kingdom) R Wilson	2	1	4
(United Kingdom) G Battrick (United Kingdom) P Hutchins	8	6	3	2	6
(United States) J McManus (United States) C Richey	6	4	6	6	3
8	(South Africa) C Drysdale (United Kingdom) R Taylor	6	6	4	6
(Denmark) J Leschly (Denmark) T Ulrich	3	1	6	4
(South Africa) G Forbes (South Africa) A Segal	30	7	4	4
(United States) A Olmedo (United States) P Segura	32	5	6	6

Third round
1	(Australia) R Emerson (Australia) R Laver	6	6	6
(United Kingdom) G Battrick (United Kingdom) P Hutchins	3	2	4
8	(South Africa) C Drysdale (United Kingdom) R Taylor	6	7	7
(United States) A Olmedo (United States) P Segura	4	5	5

Quarterfinals
1	(Australia) R Emerson (Australia) R Laver	6	8	6
8	(South Africa) C Drysdale (United Kingdom) R Taylor	4	6	3

==== Section 2 ====
First round
4	(Australia) J Newcombe (Australia) A Roche	6	6	6
(United States) R Lutz (United States) S Smith	3	4	4
(United States) D Dell (United States) E Scott	2	7	4	6	8
(United Kingdom) M Davies (United Kingdom) M Sangster	6	5	6	3	10
(France) J-P Courcol (France) R Haillet	2	5	4
(Colombia) W Álvarez (Brazil) C Fernandes	6	7	6
(Soviet Union) V Korotkov (Soviet Union) A Volkov	21	5	2
(United States) C Graebner (United States) J Osborne	23	7	6
5	(United States) E Buchholz (United States) D Ralston	6	6	6
(South Africa) R Maud (South Africa) R Moore	2	2	4
(New Zealand) B Fairlie (Australia) C Stubs
(India) N Kumar (India) P Lall	w/o
(France) P Beust (France) D Contet	4	6	9	13
(United States) T Edlefsen (United States) G Mulloy	6	3	7	11
Q	(Australia) J Bartlett (Canada) F Tutvin	2	4	2
(Australia) R Howe (Romania) I Țiriac	6	6	6

Second round
4	(Australia) J Newcombe (Australia) A Roche	6	6	9
(United Kingdom) M Davies (United Kingdom) M Sangster	3	3	7
(Colombia) W Álvarez (Brazil) C Fernandes	4	2	4
(United States) C Graebner (United States) J Osborne	6	6	6
5	(United States) E Buchholz (United States) D Ralston	6	6	6
(India) N Kumar (India) P Lall	4	4	4
(France) P Beust (France) D Contet	6	6	5	1	16
(Australia) R Howe (Romania) I Țiriac	3	4	7	6	14

Third round
4	(Australia) J Newcombe (Australia) A Roche	6	1	8	6
(United States) C Graebner (United States) J Osborne	2	6	6	3
5	(United States) E Buchholz (United States) D Ralston	6	8	3	4	6
(France) P Beust (France) D Contet	4	6	6	6	4

Quarterfinals
4	(Australia) J Newcombe (Australia) A Roche	w/o
5	(United States) E Buchholz (United States) D Ralston

=== Bottom half ===
==== Section 3 ====
First round
Q	(Japan) I Watanabe (Japan) K Watanabe	4	6	5	6	4
(United Kingdom) P Curtis (United Kingdom) G Stilwell	6	3	7	0	6
(United States) R Barth (United States) S Tidball	4	3	3
(Brazil) T Koch (Brazil) JE Mandarino	6	6	6
Q	(South Africa) T Ryan (South Africa) R Summers	w/o
(India) R Krishnan (India) J Mukerjea
(West Germany) H-J Plötz (West Germany) H-J Pohmann	3	2	2
6	(South Africa) R Hewitt (South Africa) F McMillan	6	6	6
(United Kingdom) J Barrett (Australia) J Moore	4	8	3	2
(France) P Barthès (Socialist Federal Republic of Yugoslavia) N Pilić	6	6	6	6
(United Kingdom) R Becker (United Kingdom) A Mills	4	7	8	6	4
(United States) A Ashe (United States) C Pasarell	6	5	10	3	6
(Chile) P Cornejo (Chile) J Pinto Bravo	18	7	6	3	4
(Belgium) E Drossart (Belgium) P Hombergen	16	9	4	6	6
(United States) H Fitzgibbon (United States) A Fox
3	(Spain) A Gimeno (United States) R Gonzales	w/o

Second round
(United Kingdom) P Curtis (United Kingdom) G Stilwell	4	12	2
(Brazil) T Koch (Brazil) JE Mandarino	6	14	6
Q	(South Africa) T Ryan (South Africa) R Summers	4	2	3
6	(South Africa) R Hewitt (South Africa) F McMillan	6	6	6
(France) P Barthès (Socialist Federal Republic of Yugoslavia) N Pilić	8	9	9	6	2
(United States) A Ashe (United States) C Pasarell	10	7	7	8	6
(Belgium) E Drossart (Belgium) P Hombergen	8	6	5	13
3	(Spain) A Gimeno (United States) R Gonzales	6	8	7	15

Third round
(Brazil) T Koch (Brazil) JE Mandarino	3	2	1
6	(South Africa) R Hewitt (South Africa) F McMillan	6	6	6
(United States) A Ashe (United States) C Pasarell	6	2	6	6
3	(Spain) A Gimeno (United States) R Gonzales	1	6	4	4

Quarterfinals
6	(South Africa) R Hewitt (South Africa) F McMillan	0	6	6	3	8
(United States) A Ashe (United States) C Pasarell	6	2	4	6	5

==== Section 4 ====
First round
(Poland) W Gąsiorek (Poland) B Lewandowski	3	4	3
(Spain) JL Arilla (Spain) M Orantes	6	6	6
(Australia) J Alexander (Australia) R Crealy	8	6	6
(Australia) C Dibley (Australia) B Phillips-Moore	6	4	2
(Australia) R Carmichael (Greece) N Kalogeropoulos	3	7	6	2
(Australia) K Fletcher (Spain) M Santana	6	9	4	6
(Australia) O Davidson (Australia) L Hoad	11	6	1	6	6
7	(Netherlands) T Okker (United States) M Riessen	13	4	6	3	4
Q	(South Africa) G Birt (South Africa) G Garner	2	3	4
(United Kingdom) S Matthews (United Kingdom) K Wooldridge	6	6	6
(France) J-C Barclay (France) G Goven	4	2	3
(Mexico) A Palafox (Socialist Federal Republic of Yugoslavia) N Špear	6	6	6
(Soviet Union) S Likhachev (Soviet Union) A Metreveli	6	4	11	8	8
(Czechoslovakia) M Holeček (Czechoslovakia) J Kodeš	3	6	13	6	10
(France) J-B Chanfreau (New Zealand) O Parun	4	6	1
2	(Australia) K Rosewall (Australia) F Stolle	6	8	6

Second round
(Spain) JL Arilla (Spain) M Orantes	8	11	3	6
(Australia) J Alexander (Australia) R Crealy	6	9	6	1
(Australia) K Fletcher (Spain) M Santana	6	7	4	6
(Australia) O Davidson (Australia) L Hoad	3	5	6	0
(United Kingdom) S Matthews (United Kingdom) K Wooldridge	2	5	3
(Mexico) A Palafox (Socialist Federal Republic of Yugoslavia) N Špear	6	7	6
(Czechoslovakia) M Holeček (Czechoslovakia) J Kodeš	3	3	5
2	(Australia) K Rosewall (Australia) F Stolle	6	6	7

Third round
(Spain) JL Arilla (Spain) M Orantes	2	6	3	2
(Australia) K Fletcher (Spain) M Santana	6	3	6	6
(Mexico) A Palafox (Socialist Federal Republic of Yugoslavia) N Špear	8	4	2	5
2	(Australia) K Rosewall (Australia) F Stolle	6	6	6	7

Quarterfinals
(Australia) K Fletcher (Spain) M Santana	1	1	4
2	(Australia) K Rosewall (Australia) F Stolle	6	6	6
