= Tanglewood Park Arboretum and Rose Garden =

Arboretum and garden in Clemmons, North Carolina

Coordinates: 36.0032°N 80.4066°W

- Interactive map of Tanglewood Park Arboretum and Rose Garden
- Nearest town: Clemmons, North Carolina

Tanglewood Park Arboretum and Rose Garden is an arboretum and garden located within Tanglewood Park at 4201 Clemmons Road, Clemmons, North Carolina.

The park was laid out from 1921 onwards by Mr. and Mrs. William Neal Reynolds, brother of tobacco entrepreneur R. J. Reynolds, and in 1951 willed to the citizens of Forsyth County. It is now maintained by Cooperative Extension Service, Forsyth County Center, and includes an arboretum, rose garden, and various other gardens, with displays as follows:

- Arboretum - small trees, dwarf conifers.
- Rose garden - approximately 800 rose bushes, of which some 400 are American Rose Society winners.
- Other gardens - annuals, butterfly garden, children's garden, cottage garden, daylily, fragrance garden, groundcover, herb, hosta, hydrangea, perennials, rhododendrons, rock garden, viburnum, vines, wildflowers, winter interest garden, and xeriscape.

== See also ==
- List of botanical gardens in the United States
