= Tanglewood International Tennis Classic =

Defunct tennis tournament
- Tour: Grand Prix circuit
- Founded: 1971
- Abolished: 1973
- Editions: 3
- Location: Clemmons, North Carolina, United States
- Venue: Tanglewood Park
- Surface: Clay / outdoor

The Tanglewood International Tennis Classic was a men's tennis tournament played at Tanglewood Park in Clemmons, North Carolina in the United States from 1971 through 1973. The event was part of the Grand Prix tennis circuit and was played on outdoor clay courts.

== Finals ==
=== Singles ===
Year	Champion	Runner-up	Score
1971	(Chile) Jaime Fillol	(Socialist Federal Republic of Yugoslavia) Željko Franulović	4–6, 6–4, 7–6
1972	(South Africa) Bob Hewitt	(Rhodesia) Andrew Pattison	3–6, 6–3, 6–1
1973	(Chile) Jaime Fillol	(United Kingdom) Gerald Battrick	6–2, 6–4

=== Doubles ===
Year	Champion	Runner-up	Score
1971	(United States) Jim McManus (United States) Jim Osborne	(United States) Jimmy Connors (United States) Jeff Austin	6–2, 6–4
1972	(South Africa) Bob Hewitt (Rhodesia) Andrew Pattison	(United States) Jim McManus (United States) Jim Osborne	6–4, 6–4
1973	(Australia) Bob Carmichael (South Africa) Frew McMillan	(New Zealand) Brian Fairlie (Egypt) Ismail El Shafei	6–3, 6–4
