= Ken Hiskins =

Australian tennis player

- Country (sports): Australia

Singles

Grand Slam singles results
- Australian Open: 1R (1975)
- Wimbledon: Q2 (1968)

Doubles

Grand Slam doubles results
- Australian Open: 1R (1975, 1976)
- Wimbledon: Q1 (1968)

Grand Slam mixed doubles results
- Wimbledon: 2R (1967)

Ken Hiskins is an Australian former professional tennis player.

Raised in the Victorian city of Wangaratta, Hiskins received training from revered coach Harry Hopman.

While touring Europe in the late 1960s he featured in doubles main draws at Wimbledon. In 1968 he won the Bordeaux championships. His career stalled when he was called up for National Service in 1970 and got posted to Puckapunyal, where he served as a physical training instructor. When his army service ended he focused on a career in coaching and was internationally based for many years. He coached the Israel Davis Cup team during the 1970s.

Hiskins, now living in Launceston, is the father of three children who were all involved in field hockey. His son Jeremy was a member of the gold medal-winning team at the 1998 Commonwealth Games.
