= Jaime Subirats =

Mexican tennis player

- Country (sports): Mexico
- Born: June 17, 1945
- Died: September 5, 2015 (aged 70)

Singles

Grand Slam singles results
- Wimbledon: Q2 (1968)
- US Open: 3R (1966)

Jaime Subirats (June 17, 1945 — September 5, 2015) was a Mexican professional tennis player.

Subirats, who grew up in Mexico City, received a full scholarship to attend Lamar University in Texas and played collegiate tennis from 1965 to 1968. He won a Southland Conference singles championship, was an NCAA College Division Championship singles finalist and formed a strong doubles combination with Sherwood Stewart during his time at Lamar University. His best performance on tour came at the 1966 U.S. National Championships, where he won matches against Butch Seewagen and Claude De Gronckel, before falling in the third round to Jim Osborne.
