= Central California Championships =

Defunct tennis tournament
- Tour: USNLTA Circuit (1911–23); ILTF World Circuit (1924–70) men (1924–72) women ILTF Grand Prix Circuit (1971–72) men
- Founded: 1911; 115 years ago
- Abolished: 1972; 54 years ago
- Editions: 53
- Location: Sacramento; Stockton
- Surface: Hard / outdoor

The Central California Championships also known as the Central California Open Championships (toward the end of its run) was a men's and women's international hard court tennis tournament was founded in 1911. It was first played at Stockton Tennis Club Stockton, California, United States. It was also hosted at other locations throughout its run, and for the majority of its existence was part of the ILTF World Circuit, until 1972 when it was discontinued.

== History ==
The tournament was first established in May 1911 when it was held at Stockton Tennis Club, Stockton, California, the event inaugural event was played from 27 to 30 May that year. The first winner of the men's singles was Maurice McLoughlin, and the winner of women's event was Hazel Hotchkiss.

The championships have been held in various locations including the City of Stockton, which was also the location for the second edition. In 1913 the tournament was moved to Sacramento the state capital of California where it remained for the duration of its run. The event was discontinued as an individual competition when it became a team competition. Previous winners of the men's singles have included; Roland Roberts, Bill Johnston, Frank Kovacs, Tom Brown, Whitney Reed, Alex Olmedo, Rafael Osuna. Clark Graebner, Arthur Ashe and Stan Smith.

Former winners of the women's state singles championship has included; Hazel Hotchkiss, Helen Wills, Virginia Wolfenden Kovacs, Alice Marble, Margaret Osborne, Mimi Arnold, Jean Danilovich, Rosie Casals, Farel Footman, and Nancy Richey. In 1971 the men's event became part of the ILTF Grand Prix Circuit for two editions only when it was known as the Central California Open National Hardcourt Championships. The tournament was discontinued in 1972 when it was switched from an individual competition to a team competition.

== Finals ==
=== Men's singles ===
(incomplete roll)

Year	Champions	Runners-up	Score
1911	(United States) Maurice McLoughlin	(United States) Melville Long	6–2, 6–3, 6–5.
1968	(United States) Clark Graebner	(United States) Stan Smith	10–8, 6–4, 6–2.
↓ Open era ↓
1971	(United States) Robert Lutz	(United States) Alex Olmedo	3–6, 6–4, 6–3.
1972	(United States) Stan Smith	(Australia) Colin Dibley	6–4, 5–7, 6–4, 6–4.

=== Men's doubles ===
(incomplete roll)

Year	Champions	Runners-up	Score
1971	(United States) Jim McManus (United States) Jim Osborne	(South Africa) Robert Maud (South Africa) Frew McMillan	7–6, 6–3
1972	(United States) Nancy Richey (United States) Erik van Dillen	(France) Patrice Dominguez (France) Patrick Proisy	4–6, 6–2, 6–4

=== Women's singles ===
(incomplete roll)

Year	Champions	Runners-up	Score
1911	(United States) Hazel Hotchkiss	(United States) Mary Browne	6–2, 2–6, 6–4.
1968	(United States) Denise Carter	(United States) Roylee Bailey	7–5, 6–3
↓ Open era ↓
1970	(United States) Nancy Richey	(United States) Denise Carter	10–8, 2–6, 6–3
1972	(United States) Nancy Richey	(United States) Denise Carter	5–7, 6–4, 6–4
