= Andrew Pattison =

South African tennis player (born 1949)

- Country (sports): Rhodesia; Zimbabwe; United States
- Born: 30 January 1949 (age 76); Pretoria, South Africa
- Height: 1.88 m (6 ft 2 in)
- Turned pro: 1970
- Retired: 1983
- Plays: Right-handed (one-handed backhand)

Singles
- Career record: 270–247
- Career titles: 5
- Highest ranking: No. 24 (27 September 1974)

Grand Slam singles results
- Australian Open: 1R (1980)
- French Open: 3R (1973)
- Wimbledon: 3R (1971, 1974, 1975, 1979, 1981)
- US Open: QF (1975)

Doubles
- Career record: 239–237
- Career titles: 7

Andrew Pattison (born 30 January 1949) is a South African-born Rhodesian and later Zimbabwean former tennis player. His career-high ATP singles ranking was world No. 24, which he reached on 24 September 1974. Pattison won five singles and seven doubles tournaments.

== Career finals (Open Era) ==
=== Singles (5 titles, 7 runner-ups) ===
Result	W-L	Date	Tournament	Surface	Opponent	Score
Win	1–0	Jul 1972	Newport, Wales	Grass	(United Kingdom) John de Mendoza	6–8, 6–4, 6–4
Loss	1–1	Jul 1972	Columbus, U.S.	Hard	(United States) Jimmy Connors	5–7, 3–6, 5–7
Loss	1–2	Jul 1972	Tanglewood, USA	Clay	(South Africa) Bob Hewitt	6–3, 3–6, 1–6
Loss	1–3	Aug 1972	Montreal, Canada	Clay	(Romania) Ilie Năstase	4–6, 3–6
Win	2–3	Apr 1974	Monte-Carlo, Monaco	Clay	(Romania) Ilie Năstase	5–7, 6–3, 6–4
Win	3–3	Apr 1974	Johannesburg, South Africa	Hard	(Australia) John Alexander	6–3, 7–5
Loss	3–4	Oct 1974	Vienna, Austria	Hard (i)	(United States) Vitas Gerulaitis	4–6, 6–3, 3–6, 2–6
Loss	3–5	Jan 1976	Columbus, U.S.	Carpet (i)	(United States) Arthur Ashe	6–3, 3–6, 6–7^{(4–7)}
Loss	3–6	Feb 1976	Dayton, U.S.	Carpet (i)	(Chile) Jaime Fillol Sr.	4–6, 7–6, 4–6
Win	4–6	Sep 1977	Laguna Niguel, U.S.	Hard	(Australia) Colin Dibley	2–6, 7–6, 6–4
Win	5–6	Nov 1979	Johannesburg, South Africa	Hard	(Paraguay) Víctor Pecci	2–6, 6–3, 6–2, 6–3
Loss	5–7	Jul 1980	Newport, U.S.	Grass	(India) Vijay Amritraj	1–6, 7–5, 3–6

=== Doubles (7 titles, 12 runner-ups) ===
Result	W-L	Date	Tournament	Surface	Partner	Opponents	Score
Loss	0–1	Jun 1972	Eastbourne, UK	Grass	(Greece) Nick Kalogeropoulos	(Spain) Juan Gisbert Sr. (Spain) Manuel Orantes	6–8, 3–6
Win	1–1	Jul 1972	Tanglewood, U.S.	Clay	(South Africa) Bob Hewitt	(United States) Jim McManus (United States) Jim Osborne	6–4, 6–4
Loss	1–2	Mar 1973	Atlanta, U.S.	Clay	(South Africa) Robert Maud	(Australia) Roy Emerson (Australia) Rod Laver	6–7, 3–6
Loss	1–3	Jul 1973	Washington, D.C., US	Clay	(Australia) Dick Crealy	(Australia) Ross Case (Australia) Geoff Masters	6–2, 1–6, 4–6
Loss	1–4	Feb 1974	Salisbury, U.S.	Carpet (i)	(South Africa) Byron Bertram	(United States) Jimmy Connors (South Africa) Frew McMillan	6–3, 2–6, 1–6
Loss	1–5	Apr 1974	Johannesburg, South Africa	Hard	(United States) Jim McManus	(South Africa) Bob Hewitt (South Africa) Frew McMillan	2–6, 4–6, 6–7
Win	2–5	Nov 1974	Vienna, Austria	Hard (i)	(South Africa) Ray Moore	(South Africa) Bob Hewitt (South Africa) Frew McMillan	6–4, 5–7, 6–4
Loss	2–6	Feb 1977	Dayton, U.S.	Carpet (i)	(United States) Jeff Borowiak	(United States) Hank Pfister (United States) Butch Walts	4–6, 6–7
Loss	2–7	Oct 1978	Basel, Switzerland	Hard (i)	(United States) Bruce Manson	(Poland) Wojciech Fibak (United States) John McEnroe	6–7, 5–7
Win	3–7	Nov 1978	Paris, France	Hard (i)	(United States) Bruce Manson	(Romania) Ion Țiriac (Argentina) Guillermo Vilas	7–6, 6–2
Loss	3–8	Mar 1980	Frankfurt, West Germany	Carpet (i)	(United States) Butch Walts	(India) Vijay Amritraj (United States) Stan Smith	7–6, 2–6, 2–6
Loss	3–9	Mar 1980	Milan, Italy	Carpet (i)	(United States) Butch Walts	(United States) Peter Fleming (United States) John McEnroe	2–6, 7–6, 2–6
Loss	3–10	Jun 1980	Surbiton, UK	Grass	(United States) Butch Walts	(Australia) Mark Edmondson (Australia) Kim Warwick	6–7, 7–6, 7–6, 6–7, 13–15
Win	4–10	Jul 1980	Newport, U.S.	Grass	(United States) Butch Walts	(United States) Fritz Buehning (United States) Peter Rennert	7–6, 6–4
Win	5–10	Oct 1980	Cologne, West Germany	Carpet (i)	(South Africa) Bernard Mitton	(Czechoslovakia) Jan Kodeš (Czechoslovakia) Tomáš Šmíd	6–4, 6–1
Win	6–10	Mar 1981	Denver, U.S.	Carpet (i)	(United States) Butch Walts	(United States) Mel Purcell (United States) Dick Stockton	6–3, 6–4
Loss	6–11	Jul 1981	Hilversum, Netherlands	Clay	(South Africa) Ray Moore	(Switzerland) Heinz Günthardt (Hungary) Balázs Taróczy	0–6, 2–6
Win	7–11	Aug 1981	South Orange, U.S.	Hard	(United States) Fritz Buehning	(Israel) Shlomo Glickstein (Israel) David Schneider	6–1, 6–4
Loss	7–12	Nov 1982	Johannesburg, South Africa	Hard	(Israel) Shlomo Glickstein	(United States) Brian Gottfried (South Africa) Frew McMillan	2–6, 2–6

== World Team Tennis ==
In 1974, Pattison was a member of the World Team Tennis (WTT) champion Denver Racquets. He was named 1974 WTT Playoffs Most Valuable Player.
