= Jaime Fillol =

Chilean tennis player

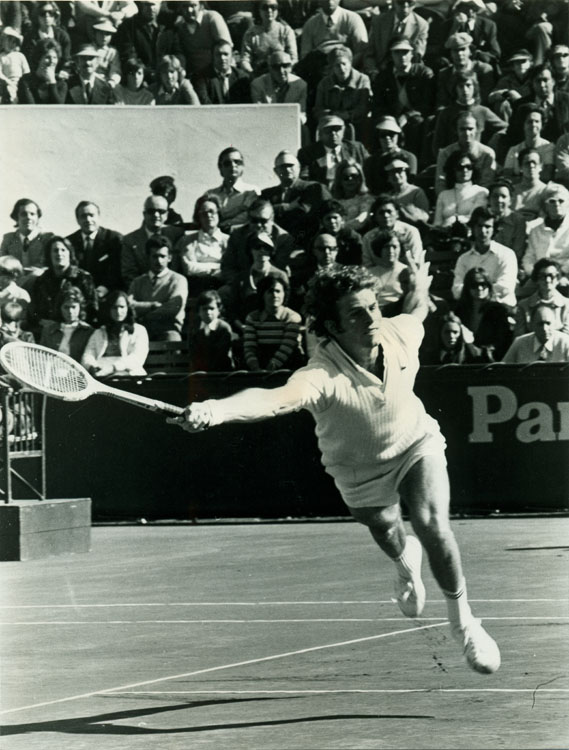
- Fillol in 1973
- Full name: Jaime José Fillol Durán
- Country (sports): Chile
- Residence: Santiago, Chile
- Born: 3 June 1946 (age 80) Santiago, Chile
- Height: 1.80 m (5 ft 11 in)
- Turned pro: 1968 (amateur from 1965)
- Retired: 1985
- Plays: Right-handed (one-handed backhand)
- Prize money: $187,169

Singles
- Career record: 554–393 in pre Open-Era & Open Era
- Career titles: 8
- Highest ranking: No. 14 (2 March 1974)

Grand Slam singles results
- French Open: 4R (1970, 1974, 1975, 1976)
- Wimbledon: 4R (1974)
- US Open: QF (1975)

Doubles
- Career record: 361–295 (Open era)
- Career titles: 16 (Open era)

Grand Slam doubles results
- French Open: F (1972)
- Wimbledon: SF (1972)
- US Open: F (1974)

Mixed doubles
- Career record: 14–14
- Career titles: 1

Grand Slam mixed doubles results
- French Open: F (1975)
- Wimbledon: QF (1970)
- US Open: 3R (1970)

Team competitions
- Davis Cup: F (1976)

Jaime José Fillol Durán (born 3 June 1946), known professionally as Jaime Fillol, is a retired professional tennis player from Chile, who played in the 1960s, 1970s and 1980s.

Fillol was ranked as high as world No. 14 in singles on the ATP rankings (achieving that ranking on 2 March 1974) and No. 82 in doubles (2 January 1984).

In the Open era (after 1968), Fillol won 6 singles titles and 16 doubles titles. Additionally, he was a founding member and one of the first presidents of the ATP. As president of the ATP, Fillol created the first pension plan of the ATP and thus it was initially named after him. Fillol is a member of the University of Miami sports hall of fame.

He competed at the 1973 Davis Cup with Patricio Cornejo where he played the longest Davis Cup rubber in terms of games, eventually losing to the United States team of Stan Smith and Erik van Dillen, winning the first set 9–7, the next 39–37, but lost the next three sets, 6–8, 1–6, 3–6 in the 1973 American Zone Final. The second set is the Davis Cup record for the most games in a set.

He was also a member of the 1975 Davis Cup team, which advanced to the semifinals, and the 1976 Davis Cup team, which made it to the final, losing to Italy.

He is the older brother of tennis player Álvaro Fillol, father of Jaime Fillol Jr., and the grandfather of tennis player Nicolás Jarry. Fillol, who currently works at a Chilean university, coached Jarry as the United Cup captain for Chile in 2024.

== Career finals ==
=== Singles: 23 (8 titles, 15 runner-ups) ===
Result	W/L	Date	Tournament	Surface	Opponent	Score
Loss	0–1	Apr 1968	St. Petersburg, US	Clay	(Canada) Mike Belkin	6–2, 0–6, 5–7, 4–6
Win	1–1	Jul 1968	Indianapolis, US	Clay	(United States) Cliff Richey	6–1, 7–5, 6–2
Loss	1–2	Mar 1969	St. Petersburg, US	Clay	(Socialist Federal Republic of Yugoslavia) Željko Franulović	2–6, 4–6, 2–6
Loss	1–3	Aug 1970	Haverford, US	Grass	(Australia) Ray Ruffels	2–6, 6–7, 3–6
Win	2–3	Feb 1971	Washington-2, US	Carpet (i)	(Brazil) Thomaz Koch	6–1, 3–6, 6–4, 6–7, 6–4
Win	3–3	Jul 1971	Clemmons, US	Clay	(Socialist Federal Republic of Yugoslavia) Željko Franulović	4–6, 6–4, 7–6
Loss	3–4	Apr 1973	Johannesburg, South Africa	Hard	(United States) Brian Gottfried	W/O
Win	4–4	Aug 1973	Clemmons, US (2)	Clay	(United Kingdom) Gerald Battrick	6–2, 6–4
Loss	4–5	Oct 1973	Madrid, Spain	Clay	(Netherlands) Tom Okker	6–4, 3–6, 3–6, 5–7
Loss	4–6	Apr 1974	Orlando WCT, US	Clay	(Australia) John Newcombe	2–6, 6–3, 3–6
Loss	4–7	Aug 1974	Louisville, US	Clay	(Argentina) Guillermo Vilas	4–6, 5–7
Win	5–7	Jun 1975	Düsseldorf, West Germany	Clay	(Czechoslovakia) Jan Kodeš	6–4, 1–6, 6–0, 7–5
Win	6–7	Feb 1976	Dayton, US	Carpet (i)	(Zimbabwe) Andrew Pattison	6–4, 6–7, 6–4
Loss	6–8	Oct 1976	Paris, France	Hard (i)	(United States) Eddie Dibbs	7–5, 4–6, 4–6, 6–7
Loss	6–9	Nov 1976	Buenos Aires, Argentina	Clay	(Argentina) Guillermo Vilas	2–6, 2–6, 3–6
Loss	6–10	Jun 1977	Nottingham, UK	Grass	(United States) Tim Gullikson	abandoned
Loss	6–11	Aug 1977	Toronto, Canada	Hard	(United States) Jeff Borowiak	0–6, 1–6
Loss	6–12	Oct 1977	Madrid, Spain	Clay	(Sweden) Björn Borg	3–6, 0–6, 7–6, 6–7
Loss	6–13	Nov 1977	Santiago, Chile	Clay	(Argentina) Guillermo Vilas	0–6, 6–2, 4–6
Loss	6–14	Nov 1977	Buenos Aires, Argentina	Clay	(Argentina) Guillermo Vilas	2–6, 5–7, 6–3, 3–6
Win	7–14	Mar 1981	Mexico City, Mexico	Clay	(Australia) David Carter	6–2, 6–3
Win	8–14	Nov 1982	Itaparica, Brazil	Carpet (i)	(Chile) Ricardo Acuña	7–6, 6–4
Loss	8–15	Feb 1983	Viña Del Mar, Chile	Clay	(Paraguay) Víctor Pecci	6–2, 5–7, 4–6

=== Doubles open era (16 titles, 14 runner-ups) ===
Result	W/L	Date	Tournament	Surface	Partner	Opponents	Score
Loss	0–1	Jul 1968	Cincinnati, U.S.	Clay	(Mexico) Joaquín Loyo-Mayo	(United States) William Brown (United States) Ron Goldman	8–10, 3–6
Win	1–1	Nov 1969	Buenos Aires, Argentina	Clay	(Chile) Patricio Cornejo	(Australia) Roy Emerson (South Africa) Frew McMillan	W/O
Win	2–1	Sep 1970	South Orange, U.S.	Hard	(Chile) Patricio Cornejo	(Spain) Andrés Gimeno (Australia) Rod Laver	3–6, 7–6, 7–6
Loss	2–2	May 1971	Bournemouth, UK	Clay	(Chile) Patricio Cornejo	(Australia) Bill Bowrey (Australia) Owen Davidson	6–8, 2–6, 6–3, 6–4, 3–6
Loss	2–3	Dec 1971	Buenos Aires, Argentina	Clay	(Chile) Patricio Cornejo	(Socialist Federal Republic of Yugoslavia) Željko Franulović (Romania) Ilie Năstase	4–6, 4–6
Win	3–3	Mar 1972	Caracas, Venezuela	Hard	(Chile) Patricio Cornejo	(United States) Jim McManus (Spain) Manuel Orantes	6–4, 6–3, 7–6
Loss	3–4	May 1972	Brussels, Belgium	Clay	(Chile) Patricio Cornejo	(Spain) Juan Gisbert (Spain) Manuel Orantes	7–9, 3–6
Loss	3–5	Jun 1972	French Open, Paris	Clay	(Chile) Patricio Cornejo	(South Africa) Bob Hewitt (South Africa) Frew McMillan	3–6, 6–8, 6–3, 1–6
Loss	3–6	Aug 1972	Indianapolis, U.S	Clay	(Chile) Patricio Cornejo	(South Africa) Bob Hewitt (South Africa) Frew McMillan	2–6, 3–6
Win	4–6	Dec 1972	Buenos Aires, Argentina	Clay	(Chile) Jaime Pinto-Bravo	(Australia) Barry Phillips-Moore (Colombia) Iván Molina	2–6, 7–6, 6–2
Loss	4–7	Jul 1974	Washington D.C., U.S.	Clay	(Chile) Patricio Cornejo	(United States) Tom Gorman (United States) Marty Riessen	5–7, 1–6
Loss	4–8	Sep 1974	U.S. Open, New York	Grass	(Chile) Patricio Cornejo	(United States) Robert Lutz (United States) Stan Smith	3–6, 3–6
Loss	4–9	Nov 1974	Buenos Aires, Argentina	Clay	(Chile) Patricio Cornejo	(Spain) Manuel Orantes (Argentina) Guillermo Vilas	4–6, 3–6
Win	5–9	Apr 1975	Charlotte, U.S.	Clay	(Chile) Patricio Cornejo	(Egypt) Ismail El Shafei (New Zealand) Brian Fairlie	6–3, 5–7, 6–4
Loss	5–10	Feb 1976	Dayton, U.S.	Carpet	(United States) Charlie Pasarell	(Australia) Ray Ruffels (United States) Sherwood Stewart	2–6, 6–3, 5–7
Win	6–10	Feb 1976	Toronto Indoor WCT, Canada	Carpet	(South Africa) Frew McMillan	(Soviet Union) Alex Metreveli (Romania) Ilie Năstase	6–7, 6–2, 6–3
Win	7–10	Aug 1977	Indianapolis, U.S.	Clay	(Chile) Patricio Cornejo	(Australia) Dick Crealy (Australia) Cliff Letcher	6–7, 6–4, 6–3
Win	8–10	Nov 1977	Santiago, Chile	Clay	(Chile) Patricio Cornejo	(United States) Henry Bunis (Australia) Paul McNamee	5–7, 6–1, 6–1
Loss	8–11	Apr 1978	Monte Carlo WCT, Monaco	Clay	(Romania) Ilie Năstase	(United States) Peter Fleming (Czechoslovakia) Tomáš Šmíd	4–6, 5–7
Win	9–11	Apr 1978	Las Vegas, U.S.	Hard	(Chile) Álvaro Fillol	(South Africa) Bob Hewitt (Mexico) Raúl Ramírez	6–3, 7–6
Win	10–11	Nov 1978	Bogotá, Colombia	Clay	(Chile) Álvaro Fillol	(Chile) Hans Gildemeister (Paraguay) Víctor Pecci	6–4, 6–3
Loss	10–12	Dec 1978	Santiago, Chile	Clay	(Chile) Álvaro Fillol	(Chile) Hans Gildemeister (Paraguay) Víctor Pecci	4–6, 3–6
Win	11–12	Nov 1979	Quito, Ecuador	Clay	(Chile) Álvaro Fillol	(Colombia) Iván Molina (Colombia) Jairo Velasco, Sr.	6–7, 6–3, 6–1
Win	12–12	Mar 1980	San José, Costa Rica	Hard	(Chile) Álvaro Fillol	(India) Anand Amritraj (United States) Nick Saviano	6–2, 7–6
Win	13–12	Oct 1980	Guangzhou, China	Carpet	(Australia) Ross Case	(United States) Andy Kohlberg (United States) Larry Stefanki	6–2, 7–6
Win	14–12	Oct 1980	Tokyo Outdoor, Japan	Clay	(Australia) Ross Case	(United States) Terry Moor (United States) Eliot Teltscher	6–3, 3–6, 6–4
Loss	14–13	Sep 1981	Palermo, Italy	Clay	(Chile) Belus Prajoux	(Uruguay) José Luis Damiani (Uruguay) Diego Pérez	1–6, 4–6
Loss	14–14	Nov 1981	Buenos Aires, Argentina	Clay	(Chile) Álvaro Fillol	(Brazil) Marcos Hocevar (Brazil) João Soares	6–7, 7–6, 4–6
Win	15–14	Nov 1982	Quito, Ecuador	Clay	(Chile) Pedro Rebolledo	(United States) Egan Adams (United States) Rocky Royer	6–2, 6–3
Win	16–14	Feb 1983	Caracas, Venezuela	Hard	(United States) Stan Smith	(Ecuador) Andrés Gómez (Romania) Ilie Năstase	6–7, 6–4, 6–3

=== Mixed doubles (1 title, 1 runner-up) ===
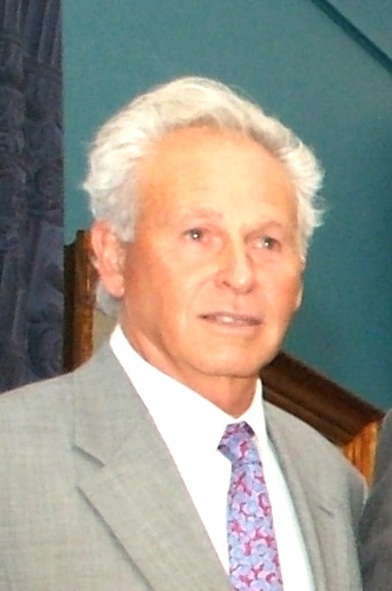
Jaime Fillol (2013)

Result	W/L	Date	Tournament	Surface	Partner	Opponents	Score
Win	1–0	Nov 1971	Torquay, UK	Carpet	(Netherlands) Betty Stöve	(United Kingdom) Winnie Shaw (United Kingdom) Keith Wooldridge	6–1, 4–6, 6–2
Loss	1–1	Jun 1975	French Open, Paris	Clay	(United States) Pam Teeguarden	(Brazil) Thomaz Koch (Uruguay) Fiorella Bonicelli	4–6, 6–7
