= 1968 Wimbledon Championships – Boys' singles =

Boys' singles
- 1968 Wimbledon Championships

Final
- Champion: (Australia) John Alexander
- Runner-up: (France) Jacques Thamin
- Score: 6–1, 6–2

Events
Singles	men	women		boys	girls
Doubles	men	women	mixed	boys	girls
← 1967 ·	Wimbledon Championships	· 1969 →

John Alexander defeated Jacques Thamin in the final, 6–1, 6–2 to win the boys' singles tennis title at the 1968 Wimbledon Championships.

== Draw ==
=== Key ===
- Q = Qualifier
- WC = Wild card
- LL = Lucky loser
- Alt = Alternate
- SE = Special exempt
- PR = Protected ranking
- ITF = ITF entry
- JE = Junior exempt
- w/o = Walkover
- r = Retired
- d = Defaulted
- SR = Special ranking

=== Finals ===
Semifinals
(France) Jacques Thamin	6	7
(United Kingdom) Stephen Warboys	4	5
(Australia) John Alexander	5	6	6
(Italy) Adriano Panatta	7	1	3

Final
(France) Jacques Thamin	1	2
(Australia) John Alexander	6	6

=== Top half ===
First round
(Netherlands) Jan Hordijk	6	6
(Poland) Witold Meres	1	4
(Denmark) E Wagner-Smitt	6	6
(Norway) Erick Ulleberg	4	3
(West Germany) Holger Osinski	4	9	4
(Venezuela) Jorge Andrew	6	7	6
(New Zealand) Ian Baudinet	w/o
(United Kingdom) Stephen Warboys
(United Arab Republic) HM Lufti	6	1	6
(Switzerland) Michel Burgener	2	6	3

Second round
(France) Jacques Thamin	6	6
(Republic of Ireland) James McArdle	4	2
(Israel) R Goldman	0	0
(Netherlands) J Hordijk	6	6
(Denmark) E Wagner-Smitt	6	3
(Venezuela) J Andrew	8	6
(United Kingdom) S Warboys	6	6
(United Arab Republic) HM Lufti	4	4

Quarterfinals
(France) J Thamin	3	6	6
(Netherlands) J Hordijk	6	3	3
(Venezuela) J Andrew	3	1
(United Kingdom) S Warboys	6	6

Semifinals
(France) J Thamin	6	7
(United Kingdom) S Warboys	4	5

=== Bottom half ===
First round
(Belgium) Robert Van Malder	10	7
(Socialist Federal Republic of Yugoslavia) N Đuranović	8	5
(Uganda) Eustace Kigongo	2	4
(Czechoslovakia) Jiří Hřebec	6	6
(Spain) Antonio Muñoz	1	1
(Australia) John Alexander	6	6
(Hungary) János Benyik	6	6
(Austria) Peter Feigl	3	4
(Monaco) P Crovetto	0	1
(Brazil) Fernando Gentil	6	6

Second round
(Belgium) R Van Malder	3	1
(Czechoslovakia) J Hřebec	6	6
(Australia) J Alexander	6	6
(Hungary) J Benyik	3	1
(Brazil) F Gentil	4	7
(Italy) Adriano Panatta	6	9
(Guyana) Evan Phillips	0	0
(Sweden) Terje Larsen	6	6

Quarterfinals
(Czechoslovakia) J Hřebec	3	2
(Australia) J Alexander	6	6
(Italy) A Panatta	6	4	6
(Sweden) T Larsen	2	6	1

Semifinals
(Australia) J Alexander	5	6	6
(Italy) A Panatta	7	1	3
