= Gerald Battrick =

Welsh former tennis player (born 1947)

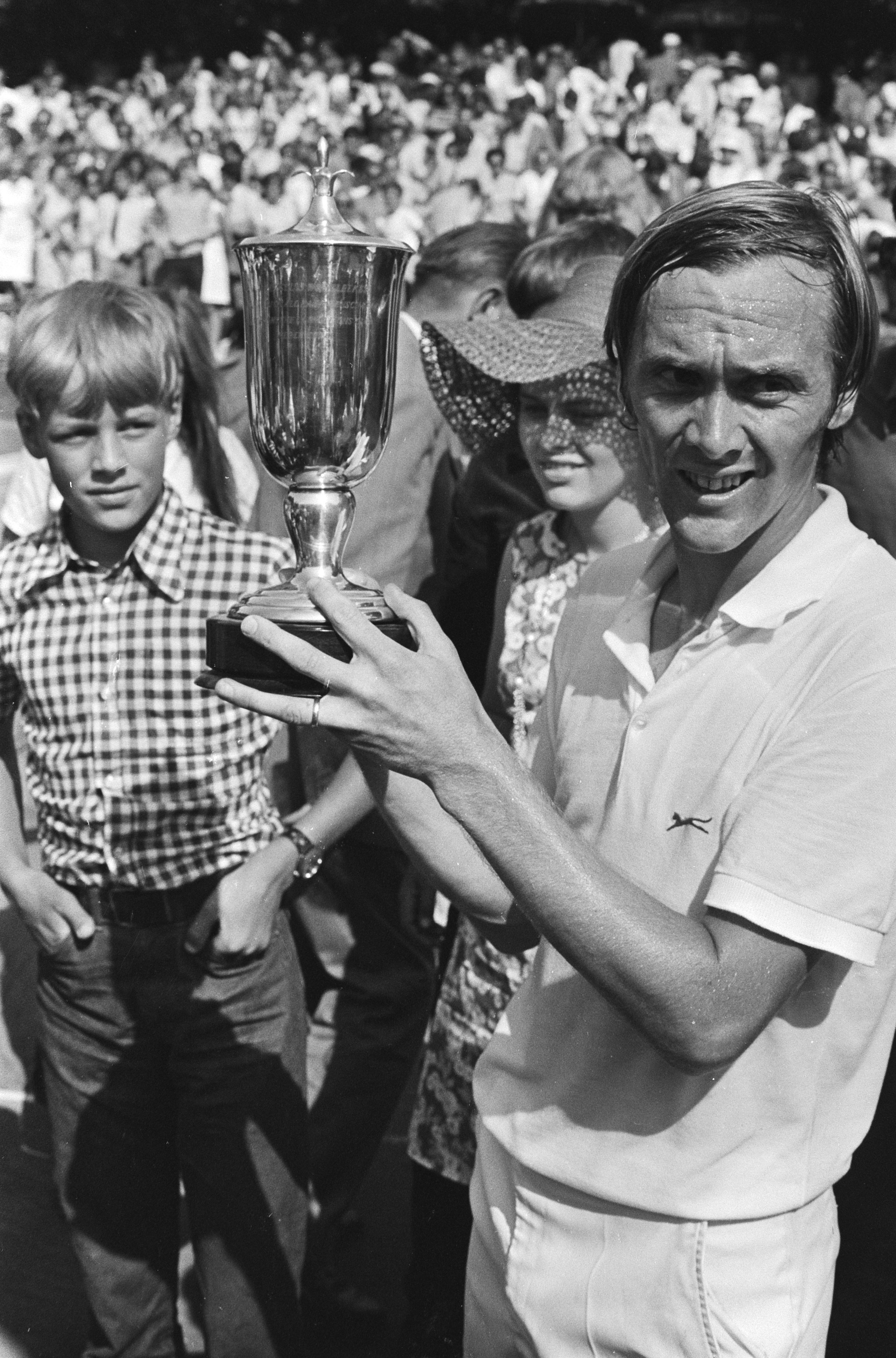
- Gerald Battrick holding the trophy at the 1971 Dutch Open
- Country (sports): United Kingdom
- Born: 27 May 1947 Bridgend, Wales
- Died: 26 November 1998 (aged 51)
- Height: 1.78 m (5 ft 10 in)
- Turned pro: 1972 (amateur from 1964)
- Retired: 1976
- Plays: Right-handed (one-handed backhand)

Singles
- Career record: 528–373
- Career titles: 27
- Highest ranking: No. 28 (27 March 1972)

Grand Slam singles results
- Australian Open: 3R (1970)
- French Open: 4R (1968)
- Wimbledon: 3R (1971)
- US Open: 2R (1969, 1971, 1974, 1976)

Doubles
- Career record: 97–134
- Career titles: 1

Grand Slam doubles results
- Australian Open: 2R (1970)
- French Open: QF (1968, 1970)
- Wimbledon: QF (1975)
- US Open: 2R (1973)

Gerald Battrick (27 May 1947 – 26 November 1998) was a Welsh tennis player who reached as high as No. 3 in Britain (and world No. 28), winning at least 6 titles.

== Personal life ==
Gerald Battrick was born on 27 May 1947 in Bridgend, Glamorgan, where his father was the Medical Officer. Like many other British tennis players of the time, including Mark Cox and Paul Hutchins, he attended Millfield School in Somerset. As a boy, one of his tennis rivals (both in Bridgend and at school) was J. P. R. Williams, who won the 1966 British Junior Championships at Wimbledon before turning his attention to rugby union.

After retiring from tennis in 1976, Battrick lived and worked in Hamburg before returning to Bridgend to open a tennis academy. He was diagnosed with a brain tumour in 1997, and died at the Princess of Wales Hospital, Bridgend, on 26 November 1998.

== Tennis career ==
=== Juniors ===
Battrick won the junior titles of Great Britain, Belgium and France and represented Britain in the Davis Cup. In 1965, he won the French Open Boys' Singles.

=== Pro tour ===
In 1971 he won the singles title at the Dutch Open in Hilversum, defeating Australian Ross Case in the final in three straight sets. He also won the British Hard Court Championships in Bournemouth, winning the final against Željko Franulović in four sets. In doubles, Battrick reached the quarterfinals of the French Open in 1968 and 1970 and at Wimbledon in 1975.

He played for the Great Britain Davis Cup team in 1970 and 1971 compiling a record of two wins and three losses. In 1972 Battrick joined Lamar Hunt's World Championship Tennis circuit.

=== World Team Tennis ===
Battrick played for the co-ed Pittsburgh Triangles of World TeamTennis in 1974 and 1975. He was part of the Triangles 1975 league championship team.

== Open Era career finals ==
=== Singles: 7 (4 titles / 3 runner-ups) ===
Finals by surface
Hard (1–2)
Grass (0–0)
Clay (2–1)
Carpet (1–0)

Result	W/L	Date	Tournament	Surface	Opponent	Score
Loss	0–1	Mar 1970	Caracas, Venezuela	Hard	(United States) Tom Gorman	2–6, 4–6, 6–3, 4–6
Win	1–1	Mar 1970	Willemstad, Curaçao	Hard	(Spain) Juan Gisbert Sr.	2–6, 6–3, 7–5, 6–4
Loss	1–2	Apr 1970	Kingston, Jamaica	Hard	(West Germany) Christian Kuhnke	4–6, 0–6
Win	2–2	May 1971	Bournemouth, UK	Clay	(Socialist Federal Republic of Yugoslavia) Željko Franulović	6–3, 6–2, 5–7, 6–0
Win	3–2	Aug 1971	Hilversum, Netherlands	Clay	(Australia) Ross Case	6–3, 6–4, 9–7
Win	4–2	Nov 1971	London, UK	Carpet (i)	(South Africa) Bob Hewitt	6–3, 6–4
Loss	4–3	Apr 1973	Clemmons, U.S.	Clay	(Chile) Jaime Fillol Sr.	2–6, 4–6

=== Doubles: 5 (1 title / 4 runner-ups) ===
Result	W/L	Date	Tournament	Surface	Partner	Opponents	Score
Loss	0–1	Aug 1968	Kitzbühel, Austria	Clay	(United Kingdom) Bobby Wilson	(West Germany) Wilhelm Bungert (West Germany) Jürgen Fassbender	3–6, 5–7
Loss	0–2	Feb 1971	Caracas, Venezuela	Clay	(United Kingdom) Peter Curtis	(Brazil) Thomaz Koch (Brazil) José Edison Mandarino	4–6, 6–3, 7–6, 4–6, 6–7
Win	1–2	Aug 1973	Columbus, U.S.	Hard	(United Kingdom) Graham Stilwell	(Australia) Colin Dibley (United States) Charlie Pasarell	6–4, 7–6
Loss	1–3	Sep 1973	Chicago, U.S.	Carpet (i)	(United Kingdom) Graham Stilwell	(Australia) Owen Davidson (Australia) John Newcombe	7–6, 6–7, 6–7
Loss	1–3	Nov 1973	London, UK	Carpet (i)	(United Kingdom) Graham Stilwell	(United Kingdom) Mark Cox (Australia) Owen Davidson	4–6, 6–8
