= Jim McManus (tennis) =

American tennis player

- Full name: James Henry McManus
- Country (sports): United States
- Born: September 16, 1940; Oakland, California
- Died: January 18, 2011 (aged 70); Ponte Vedra Beach, Florida
- Height: 5 ft 9 in (1.75 m)
- Turned pro: 1958 (amateur tour); 1968 (pro tour)
- Retired: 1979
- Plays: Left-handed
- College: California-Berkeley

Singles
- Career record: 422–407
- Career titles: 22
- Highest ranking: No. 90 (15 October 1973)

Grand Slam singles results
- Australian Open: 1R (1970)
- French Open: 2R (1970, 1973)
- Wimbledon: 4R (1972)
- US Open: 3R (1970)

Doubles
- Career record: 174–170
- Career titles: 10
- Highest ranking: No. 102 (12 December 1976)

Grand Slam doubles results
- Australian Open: 2R (1970)
- French Open: QF (1973)
- Wimbledon: QF (1972)
- US Open: SF (1968)

James Henry McManus (September 16, 1940 – January 18, 2011) was an American tennis player who reached the semifinals of the US Open men's doubles in 1968. He was active from 1958 to 1979 and won 22 career singles titles. McManus was a founding member of the Association of Tennis Professionals.

== Biography ==
McManus was born to Tom and Margaret McManus on September 16, 1940, and had two brothers – Tom and Bob. McManus was married to his wife Carole for more than 30 years and had two children, Kate and Jordy. He grew up in Northern California and learned the game of tennis at the Berkeley Tennis Club where he was coached by several instructors including Tom Stow, coach of tennis legend Don Budge.

Later, McManus played No. 1 singles at the University of California for Coach Chet Murphy. The team finished No. 3 in the NCAA tournament in 1961, his senior year. He and Bill Hoogs Jr. were runners-up in doubles to Allen Fox and Larry Nagler at the Ojai Tennis Tournament in 1961.

McManus was a founding member of the Association of Tennis Professionals (ATP) in 1972 and a member of its original board of directors.

In 2010, he published Tennis History: Professional Tournaments – Winners & Runner-Ups. In 2015, the ATP launched the Jim McManus Memorial Fund in his honor.

== Career finals (Open Era) ==
=== Doubles (10 titles, 4 runner-ups) ===
Result	W-L	Date	Tournament	Surface	Partner	Opponents	Score
Loss	0–1	Sep 1969	Los Angeles, U.S.	Hard	(United States) Jim Osborne	(United States) Pancho Gonzales (United States) Ron Holmberg	3–6, 4–6
Loss	0–2	Aug 1970	Merion, U.S.	Hard	(United States) Jim Osborne	(Australia) Bill Bowrey (Australia) Ray Ruffels	6–3, 2–6, 5–7
Win	1–2	Jul 1971	Clemmons, U.S.	Clay	(United States) Jim Osborne	(United States) Jeff Austin (United States) Jimmy Connors	6–2, 6–4
Win	2–2	Aug 1971	Columbus, U.S.	Hard	(United States) Jim Osborne	(United States) Jimmy Connors (United States) Roscoe Tanner	4–6, 7–5, 6–2
Win	3–2	Sep 1971	Sacramento, U.S.	Hard	(United States) Jim Osborne	(South Africa) Bob Maud (South Africa) Frew McMillan	7–6, 6–3
Win	4–2	Feb 1972	Des Moines, U.S.	Carpet (i)	(United States) Jim Osborne	(France) Georges Goven (Brazil) Thomaz Koch	6–2, 6–3
Win	5–2	Feb 1972	Los Angeles, U.S.	Hard (i)	(United States) Jim Osborne	(Romania) Ilie Năstase (Romania) Ion Țiriac	6–2, 5–7, 6–4
Loss	5–3	Mar 1972	Caracas, Venezuela	Hard	(Spain) Manuel Orantes	(Chile) Patricio Cornejo (Chile) Jaime Fillol	4–6, 6–7
Win	6–3	Jun 1972	London/Queen's, UK	Grass	(United States) Jim Osborne	(West Germany) Jürgen Fassbender (West Germany) Karl Meiler	4–6, 6–3, 7–5
Loss	6–4	Jul 1972	Tanglewood, U.S.	Clay	(United States) Jim Osborne	(South Africa) Bob Hewitt (Rhodesia) Andrew Pattison	4–6, 4–6
Win	7–4	Mar 1973	St. Louis, U.S.	Carpet (i)	(Sweden) Ove Bengtson	(Australia) Terry Addison (Australia) Colin Dibley	6–2, 7–5
Win	8–4	Jun 1973	Eastbourne, UK	Grass	(Sweden) Ove Bengtson	(Spain) Manuel Orantes (Romania) Ion Țiriac	6–4, 4–6, 7–5
Win	9–4	Jul 1973	Kitzbühel, Austria	Clay	(Mexico) Raúl Ramírez	(Brazil) José Mandarino (Argentina) Tito Vázquez	6–2, 6–2, 6–3
Win	10–4	Oct 1973	New Delhi, India	Clay	(Mexico) Raúl Ramírez	(India) Anand Amritraj (India) Vijay Amritraj	6–2, 6–4
