= 1968 Wimbledon Championships =

- Date: 24 June – 6 July
- Edition: 82nd
- Category: Grand Slam
- Prize money: £26,150
- Surface: Grass
- Location: Church Road; SW19, Wimbledon, London, United Kingdom
- Venue: All England Lawn Tennis and Croquet Club

Champions

Men's singles
- (Australia) Rod Laver

Women's singles
- (United States) Billie Jean King

Men's doubles
- (Australia) John Newcombe / (Australia) Tony Roche

Women's doubles
- (United States) Rosie Casals / (United States) Billie Jean King

Mixed doubles
- (Australia) Ken Fletcher / (Australia) Margaret Court

Boys' singles
- (Australia) John Alexander

Girls' singles
- (United States) Kristy Pigeon
- Wimbledon Championships

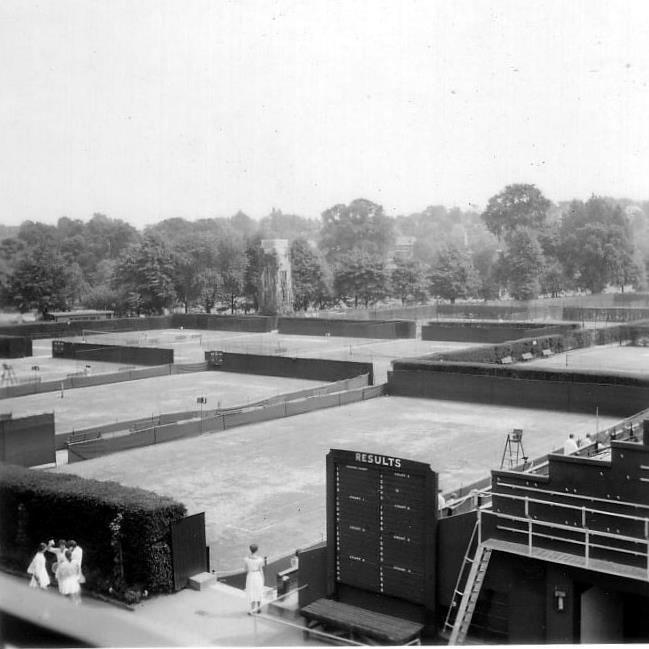
1968 Wimbledon Championships

The 1968 Wimbledon Championships was a combined men's and women's tennis tournament that took place on the outdoor grass courts at the All England Lawn Tennis and Croquet Club in Wimbledon, London, United Kingdom. The tournament was held from Monday 24 June until Saturday 6 July 1968. It was the 82nd staging of the Wimbledon Championships, and the third Grand Slam tennis event of 1968.

This tournament started the Open Era for Wimbledon, as it became the second Grand Slam tournament to offer prize money and allow professionals to compete after the 1968 French Open. Singles champions Rod Laver and Billie Jean King had already won Wimbledon twice before in the amateur era.

== Prize money ==
The 1968 championships was the first edition of the tournament to offer prize money. The total prize money for the event was £26,150. The winner of the men's title earned £2,000 while the women's singles champion earned £750.

It was the last tournament at which the Men's Singles final was played on a Friday.

Event	W	F	SF	QF	Round of 16	Round of 32	Round of 64	Round of 128
Men's singles	£2,000	£1,300	£750	£400	£150	£100	£75	£50
Women's singles	£750	£450	£300	£150	£90	£50	£35	£25
Men's doubles *	£800	£500	£350	£180	£0	£0	£0	—N/a
Women's doubles*	£500	£300	£150	£100	£0	£0	£0	—N/a
Mixed doubles*	£450	£300	£150	£100	£0	£0	£0	£0

* per team

== Champions ==
=== Seniors ===
==== Men's singles ====
(Australia) Rod Laver defeated (Australia) Tony Roche, 6–3, 6–4, 6–2

==== Women's singles ====
(United States) Billie Jean King defeated (Australia) Judy Tegart, 9–7, 7–5

==== Men's doubles ====
(Australia) John Newcombe / (Australia) Tony Roche defeated (Australia) Ken Rosewall / (Australia) Fred Stolle, 3–6, 8–6, 5–7, 14–12, 6–3

==== Women's doubles ====
(United States) Rosie Casals / (United States) Billie Jean King defeated (France) Françoise Dürr / (United Kingdom) Ann Jones, 3–6, 6–4, 7–5

==== Mixed doubles ====
(Australia) Ken Fletcher / (Australia) Margaret Court defeated (Soviet Union) Alex Metreveli / (Soviet Union) Olga Morozova, 6–1, 14–12

=== Juniors ===
==== Boys' singles ====
(Australia) John Alexander defeated (France) Jacques Thamin, 6–1, 6–2

==== Girls' singles ====
(United States) Kristy Pigeon defeated (Australia) Lesley Hunt, 6–4, 6–3

== Seeds ==
=== Men's singles ===
1. (Australia) Rod Laver (champion)
2. (Australia) Ken Rosewall (fourth round, lost to Tony Roche)
3. (Spain) Andrés Gimeno (third round, lost to Raymond Moore)
4. (Australia) John Newcombe (fourth round, lost to Arthur Ashe)
5. (Australia) Roy Emerson (fourth round, lost to Tom Okker)
6. (Spain) Manuel Santana (third round, lost to Clark Graebner)
7. (Australia) Lew Hoad (third round, lost to Bob Hewitt)
8. (United States) Pancho Gonzales (third round, lost to Alex Metreveli)
9. (United States) Dennis Ralston (quarterfinals, lost to Rod Laver)
10. (United States) Butch Buchholz (quarterfinals, lost to Tony Roche)
11. (Australia) Fred Stolle (fourth round, lost to Clark Graebner)
12. (Netherlands) Tom Okker (quarter-finals, lost to Arthur Ashe)
13. (United States) Arthur Ashe (semi-finals, lost to Rod Laver)
14. (South Africa) Cliff Drysdale (third round, lost to Tom Edlefsen)
15. (Australia) Tony Roche (final, lost to Rod Laver)
16. (Socialist Federal Republic of Yugoslavia) Nikola Pilić (first round, lost to Herb Fitzgibbon)

=== Women's singles ===
1. (United States) Billie Jean King (champion)
2. (Australia) Margaret Court (quarterfinals, lost to Judy Tegart)
3. (United States) Nancy Richey (semifinals, lost to Judy Tegart)
4. (United Kingdom) Ann Jones (semifinals, lost to Billie Jean King)
5. (United Kingdom) Virginia Wade (first round, lost to Christina Sandberg)
6. (Brazil) Maria Bueno (quarterfinals, lost to Nancy Richey)
7. (Australia) Judy Tegart (final, lost to Billie Jean King)
8. (Australia) Lesley Bowrey (quarterfinals, lost to Billie Jean King)

Preceded by 1968 French Open	Grand Slams	Succeeded by 1968 US Open
