= Tanglewood Park =

Recreation center and park in Clemmons, Forsyth County, North Carolina

Coordinates: 35°59′39″N 80°24′33″W

Tanglewood Park is a recreation center and park in Clemmons, North Carolina, United States. It is located on the Yadkin River between Clemmons and Bermuda Run, North Carolina. It is home to the annual "Tanglewood Festival of Lights," a display of lights in the wintertime celebrating the holidays. Additional attractions include the Tanglewood Park Arboretum and Rose Garden, a public pool, a dog park, horse stables, and Mallard Lake for fishing and paddleboat renting. Tanglewood has two golf courses, the Championship Course (designed by Robert Trent Jones, Sr.) and the Reynolds Course. The former hosted the PGA Championship in 1974, won by Lee Trevino, with Jack Nicklaus one stroke back.

== Festival of Lights ==
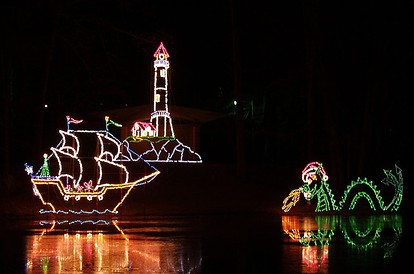
A Festival of Lights display on one of Tanglewood Park's lakes.

Tanglewood Park's Festival of Lights is an outside drive-thru light show open to the public every winter. Visitors can drive their own vehicles through the course or take a hay ride for a fee. The light show at Tanglewood started in 1992 with a grant from the Z. Smith Reynolds Charitable Trust as well as funds raised by the Tanglewood Park Foundation. In its early days, the Festival of Lights was a 1.5-mile (2.4 km) route with 25 light displays. The route is approximately 4 miles (6.4 km) long adorned with about 180 displays (70 of which are animated). An estimated 300,000 visitors converged at Tanglewood Park for the 2001 Festival of Lights as the event celebrated its 10th Anniversary and honored those who died on September 11, 2001. Today, over a million lights complete the light show. The festival has been recognized as a "Top 20 Event in the Southeast" and a "Top 100 Event in North America".

== History ==
Among the earliest European settlers of the Yadkin River Valley was William Johnson, an immigrant from Wales. In 1757, just four years after the Moravian settlement of the Wachovia Tract in the nearby communities of Bethabara and Salem, Johnson purchased the mile square central portion of the present property from the Ellis family to whom the land was deeded in 1753 by Lord William Linville. The Ellis family leased the land for a short time "for five shillings lawful money of Great Britain in hand a yearly rent of one peppercorn payment at the Feast of Saint Michael, the archangel". After obtaining the property, Johnson built a fort overlooking the Yadkin River to protect his family and neighbors from attacks during the French and Indian War. Currently, this spot is marked by a monument just south of the Manor House. In 1765, he died and is now buried on the highest hill in the area called Mount Pleasant. In 1809 a simple frame church was erected next to his grave and remains today as one of the park's architectural attractions. Although services are no longer held there, many people are united in marriage at the Mount Pleasant Church each year.

In 1859, James Johnson had the 18 room Manor House built on a hill in the center of the estate. The house was a gift of love to his daughter, Emily, for a wedding present. Two wings were added later.

=== Tanglewood Farm ===
The Johnson heirs sold their property in 1921 to William Neal Reynolds, brother of tobacco entrepreneur R. J. Reynolds. At that time the Tanglewood tract was enlarged to over 1,100 acres (4.5 km^{2}) and the Manor House expanded to 28 rooms. Mr. Will, as he was called, raised and raced Standardbred harness horses and established Tanglewood Farm as a home to some of the country's finest pacers. In the Manor House, Mr. Will had a special room dedicated to his trophies, called the "Trophy Room." A fire that started mysteriously in a trophy room display case in 1980 did considerable damage, but the room has been restored. The room is surrounded by plaques and horse photographs. Mr. Will was a horse lover, and this tradition is carried on with Tanglewood Stables. Trail rides, hayrides, and carriage rides are available by reservation.

Today, the Manor House is a Bed & Breakfast Inn with 10 guest rooms, sweeping staircases, the Trophy Room, 20's Room, and Rock Fireplace Room. These facilities are used for weddings, meetings, and overnight accommodations.

Mr. Will's wife, Kate, a horticultural enthusiast, began the extensive native and ornamental plantings at Tanglewood and employed German master gardener, Mr. Frank Lustig, who continued her plans and his life's work. He contributed the 800 bush Rose Garden on the Manor House lawn, the Arboretum behind the house, and the nearby Fragrance Garden to the estate. For 60 years, even after the death of his employers, and their gift of the estate, Lustig poured his talents into Tanglewood. He is buried in the graveyard at Tanglewood next to the historic church. The Reynolds couple had no children, and, as a gesture enabling others to benefit from the beauty, elegance, history, and recreation their country estate had to offer, in 1951, they willed the Tanglewood property to the citizens of Forsyth County to share as a public recreational park. At the time, Will Reynolds specified it was to be used only for the benefit of white citizens or its ownership would revert to his heirs, so it opened in 1954 as a segregated park. When the Civil Rights Act of 1964 made it difficult to continue operating under those terms, the park closed its Manor House, pool, theater, motel, and restaurant. A federal court case forced desegregation of the park in 1971, which reverted its ownership to the Reynolds family, who leased it to a nonprofit before finally selling it to Forsyth County in 1976.

== Cross country ==
Tanglewood Park was also the site for the NCHSAA State Championship for Cross Country for eight consecutive years between 2001 and 2009. The location of this cross country meet moved to Beeson Park in Kernersville, NC in 2010. Tanglewood Park is also the site for the Ascis 4runners only Invitational.

== See also ==
- North Carolina Wine Festival
