= Clemmons, North Carolina =

Village in North Carolina, United States

- Village
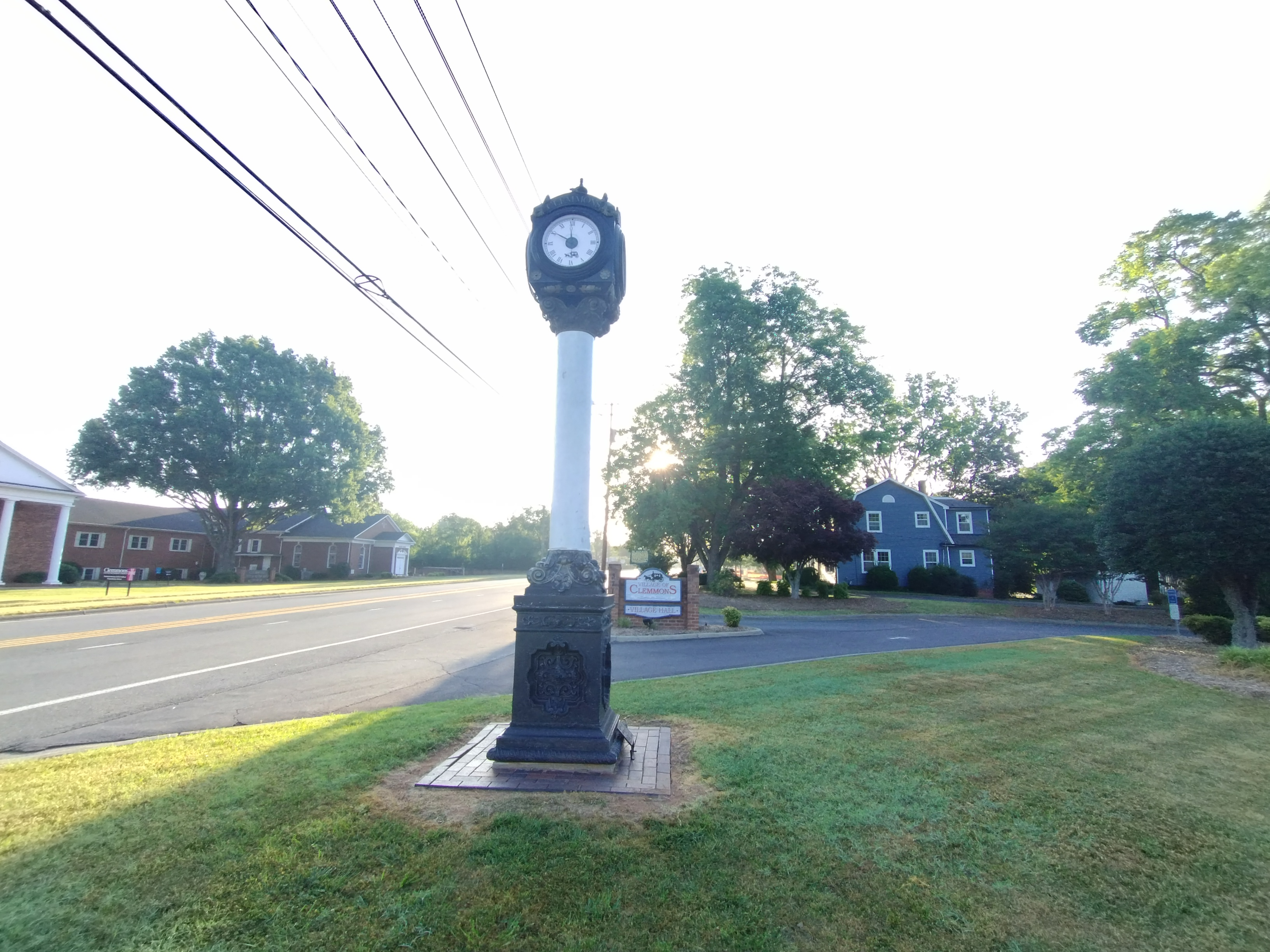
- Clemmons NC Village Hall

- Location in Forsyth County and the state of North Carolina
- Coordinates: 36°01′55″N 80°23′10″W
- Country: United States
- State: North Carolina
- County: Forsyth
- Founded: 1802
- Incorporated: 1824, 1986
- Named for: Peter Clemmons

Government
  - Mayor: Michael Rogers
  - Mayor Pro Tempore: Michael Combest

Area
  - Total: 12.15 sq mi (31.46 km^{2})
  - Land: 11.94 sq mi (30.93 km^{2})
  - Water: 0.21 sq mi (0.54 km^{2})
- Elevation: 820 ft (250 m)

Population (2020)
  - Total: 21,163
  - Density: 1,772.2/sq mi (684.24/km^{2})
- Time zone: UTC-5 (Eastern (EST))
  - Summer (DST): UTC-4 (EDT)
- ZIP code: 27012
- Area codes: 336, 743
- FIPS code: 37-12960
- GNIS feature ID: 2407434
- Website: clemmons.org

Clemmons is a village in Forsyth County, North Carolina, United States, and a suburb of Winston-Salem. The population was 21,177 at the 2020 census, with an estimated population of 21,517 in 2021.

== Geography ==
Clemmons is located in southwestern Forsyth County, directly east of the Yadkin River. Winston-Salem is located east and northeast of the village, Lewisville is located north of the village, with Bermuda Run located west and southwest of the village. Most of the village is actually inside the overall Urban Hanes Mall district. The areas south of the overall downtown area of Clemmons, which surrounds the Davidson County line, is in its own entity, separate from the Mall District. The village is proposed to be accessed by two Interstates; Interstate 40 in the central areas of the village and the proposed-Interstate 777 in the northern outskirts of the village (in which I-777 would utilize the existing stretch of US 421). The interchange with I-40 and NC 452 (in which NC 452 would be designed as I-274), is proposed to be located in either, the eastern outskirts of the village limits or east of the entirety of the village limits. The stature of Southern Forsyth County (which includes Clemmons), includes economic considerations, shifted geography, and the likes, to connect to the "existing" hubs of Raleigh and Charlotte, the "developing" hub of Greensboro, and broader cross-regional access.

According to the United States Census Bureau, Clemmons has a total area of 12.0 square miles (31.1 km^{2}), of which 11.8 square miles (30.6 km^{2}) is land and 0.2 square miles (0.5 km^{2}), or 1.74%, is water.

== Demographics ==
Historical population
Census	Pop.	Note	%±
1990	6,020		—
2000	13,827		129.7%
2010	18,627		34.7%
2020	21,163		13.6%
2025 (est.)	22,808	▲	7.8%
U.S. Decennial Census

=== 2020 census ===
As of the 2020 census, Clemmons had a population of 21,163. There were 8,427 households and 5,400 families residing in the village. The median age was 43.7 years. 22.1% of residents were under the age of 18 and 20.8% were 65 years of age or older. For every 100 females there were 89.5 males, and for every 100 females age 18 and over there were 85.4 males age 18 and over.

99.9% of residents lived in urban areas, while 0.1% lived in rural areas.

There were 8,897 housing units, of which 5.3% were vacant. The homeowner vacancy rate was 1.1% and the rental vacancy rate was 9.2%. Of all households, 32.0% had children under the age of 18 living in them, 54.0% were married-couple households, 14.1% were households with a male householder and no spouse or partner present, and 27.4% were households with a female householder and no spouse or partner present. About 26.2% of all households were made up of individuals, and 12.3% had someone living alone who was 65 years of age or older.

Clemmons racial composition
Race	Number	Percentage
White (non-Hispanic)	15,466	73.08%
Black or African American (non-Hispanic)	1,715	8.1%
Native American	36	0.17%
Asian	919	4.34%
Pacific Islander	9	0.04%
Other/Mixed	829	3.92%
Hispanic or Latino	2,189	10.34%

=== 2000 census ===
As of the census of 2000, there were 13,827 people, 5,291 households, and 3,947 families residing in the village. The population density was 1,291.2 inhabitants per square mile (498.5/km^{2}). There were 5,614 housing units at an average density of 524.2 per square mile (202.4/km^{2}). The racial makeup of the village was 89.87% White, 5.21% African American, 0.09% Native American, 2.10% Asian, 0.02% Pacific Islander, 1.76% from other races, and 0.95% from two or more races. Hispanic or Latino of any race were 3.54% of the population.

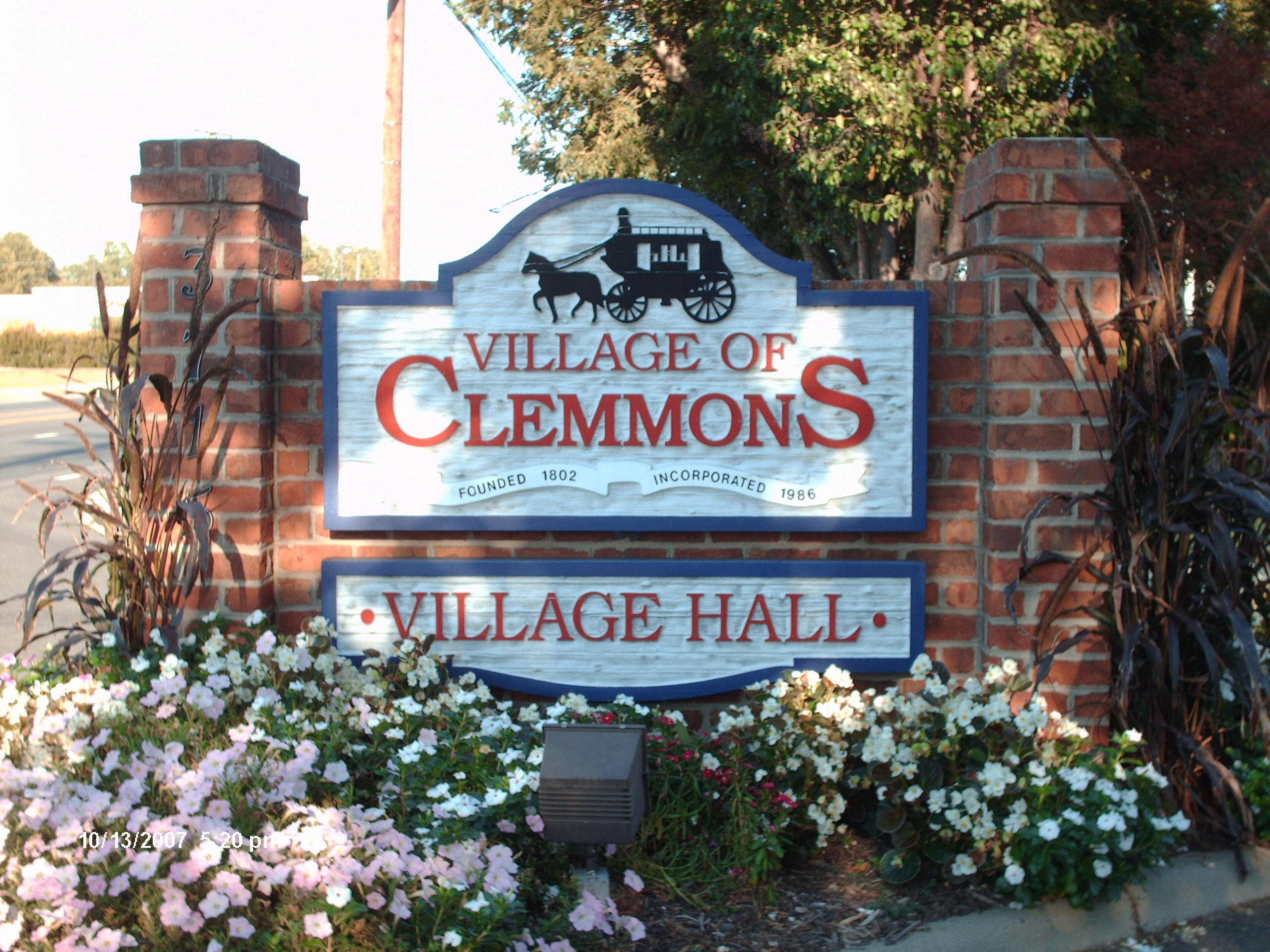
Clemmons Town Hall

There were 5,291 households, out of which 36.3% had children under the age of 18 living with them, 64.5% were married couples living together, 7.7% had a female householder with no husband present, and 25.4% were non-families. 5.6% of households had someone living alone who was 65 years of age or older. The average household size was 2.56 and the average family size was 2.97.

In the village, the population was spread out, with 25.7% under the age of 18, 6.1% from 18 to 24, 30.6% from 25 to 44, 26.0% from 45 to 64, and 11.7% who were 65 years of age or older. The median age was 38 years. For every 100 females, there were 92.7 males. For every 100 females age 18 and over, there were 90.0 males.

The median income for a household in the village was $60,486, and the median income for a family was $70,029. Males had a median income of $49,892 versus $32,558 for females. The per capita income for the village was $27,679. About 2.8% of families and 3.5% of the population were below the poverty line, including 3.6% of those under age 18 and 8.5% of those age 65 or over.

== Arts and culture ==
Points of interest include:

- Tanglewood Park
- Tanglewood Park Arboretum and Rose Garden
- Tanglewood Park's Festival of Lights (seasonal)
- Clemmons Library

== Sports ==
The Clemmons Little League baseball team made the 2002 Little League World Series as the Southeast team before losing in the pool play stage. A notable player on the team was 2011 NASCAR Camping World Truck Series and 2013 NASCAR Nationwide Series champion Austin Dillon.

== Government ==
Clemmons operates under a council/manager government. Legislative authority and policy rest with an elected council composed five council members and a mayor. The mayor is Michael Rogers.

The tax rate for the Village of Clemmons is $0.15 per $100 of property tax value.

== Education ==
West Forsyth High School, the largest high school in Forsyth County, is located in Clemmons.

== Infrastructure ==
Highways include

- I-40
- US 421
- US 158
