= Jim Osborne (tennis) =

American tennis player

- Country (sports): United States
- Born: February 1, 1945 (age 80); Honolulu, Hawaii
- Height: 6 ft 1 in (185 cm)

Singles
- Career record: 111–116

Grand Slam singles results
- Australian Open: 3R (1967)
- French Open: 1R (1970)
- Wimbledon: 2R (1968)
- US Open: 4R (1966, 1971)

Doubles
- Career record: 92–49

Grand Slam doubles results
- French Open: 4R (1970)
- Wimbledon: QF (1972)
- US Open: SF (1968)

Jim Osborne (born February 1, 1945) is a former professional tennis player from the United States. He achieved most of his tennis success while playing doubles. During his career, he won five doubles titles, and he won an Olympic bronze medal in doubles.

== Career finals ==
=== Doubles (7 titles, 3 runner-ups) ===
Result	W-L	Date	Tournament	Surface	Partner	Opponents	Score
Loss	0–1	Sep 1969	Los Angeles, U.S.	Hard	(United States) Jim McManus	(United States) Pancho Gonzales (United States) Ron Holmberg	3–6, 4–6
Loss	0–2	Aug 1970	Merion, U.S.	Hard	(United States) Jim McManus	(Australia) Bill Bowrey (Australia) Ray Ruffels	6–3, 2–6, 5–7
Win	1–2	Jul 1971	Clemmons, U.S.	Clay	(United States) Jim McManus	(United States) Jeff Austin (United States) Jimmy Connors	6–2, 6–4
Win	2–2	Aug 1971	Columbus, U.S.	Hard	(United States) Jim McManus	(United States) Jimmy Connors (United States) Roscoe Tanner	4–6, 7–5, 6–2
Win	3–2	Aug 1971	Merion, U.S.	Hard	(United States) Clark Graebner	(United States) Robert McKinley (United States) Dick Stockton	7–6, 6–3
Win	4–2	Sep 1971	Sacramento, U.S.	Hard	(United States) Jim McManus	(South Africa) Bob Maud (South Africa) Frew McMillan	7–6, 6–3
Win	5–2	Feb 1972	Des Moines, U.S.	Carpet (i)	(United States) Jim McManus	(France) Georges Goven (Brazil) Thomaz Koch	6–2, 6–3
Win	6–2	Feb 1972	Los Angeles, U.S.	Hard (i)	(United States) Jim McManus	(Romania) Ilie Năstase (Romania) Ion Țiriac	6–2, 5–7, 6–4
Win	7–2	Jun 1972	London/Queen's, UK	Grass	(United States) Jim McManus	(West Germany) Jürgen Fassbender (West Germany) Karl Meiler	4–6, 6–3, 7–5
Loss	7–3	Jul 1972	Tanglewood, U.S.	Clay	(United States) Jim McManus	(South Africa) Bob Hewitt (Rhodesia) Andrew Pattison	4–6, 4–6
