= 1968 US Open – Women's doubles =

Women's doubles
- 1968 US Open

Final
- Champions: (Brazil) Maria Bueno (Australia) Margaret Court
- Runners-up: (United States) Rosemary Casals (United States) Billie Jean King
- Score: 4–6, 9–7, 8–6

Details
- Draw: 16
- Seeds: 4

Events
| Singles | men | women | | boys | girls |
| Doubles | men | women | mixed | boys | girls |
| WC Singles | men | women | quad |
| WC Doubles | men | women | quad |
| Legends | men | women | mixed |
| ← 1967 · | US Open | · 1969 → |

Rosemary Casals and Billie Jean King were the defending champions, but lost in the final to Maria Bueno and Margaret Court, 4–6, 9–7, 8–6. It was Bueno and Court's only grand slam title together.

== Seeds ==
1. (United States) Rosemary Casals / (United States) Billie Jean King (final)
2. (France) Françoise Dürr / (United Kingdom) Ann Jones (semifinals)
3. (Brazil) Maria Bueno / (Australia) Margaret Court (champions)
4. (United States) Mary-Ann Eisel / (United States) Carole Graebner (first round)

== Draw ==
=== Key ===
- Q = Qualifier
- WC = Wild card
- LL = Lucky loser
- Alt = Alternate
- ITF = ITF entry
- PR = Protected ranking
- SR = Special ranking
- SE = Special exempt
- JE = Junior exempt
- JR = Junior Accelerator Programme entrant
- CO = College Accelerator Programme entrant
- NG = Next Gen Accelerator Program entrant
- w/o = Walkover
- r = Retired
- d = Defaulted

First round
2 | (France) F Dürr (United Kingdom) A Jones | 6 | 6
(United States) S DeFina (United States) P Hogan | 3 | 3
(United States) D Carter (United States) T Lyman | 2 | 0
(United States) K Harter (United States) J Heldman | 6 | 6
3 | (Brazil) M Bueno (Australia) M Court | 6 | 6
(United States) P Teeguarden (United States) L Tuero | 1 | 0
(United States) P Cody (United States) N Netter | 6 | 6
(South Africa) M Godwin (South Africa) L Rossouw | 4 | 1
(United Kingdom) V Wade (United Kingdom) J Williams | 6 | 6
(United States) M Aschner (United States) P Lamm | 2 | 1
(Australia) K Krantzcke (United States) V Rogers | 6 | 6
4 | (United States) MA Eisel (United States) C Graebner | 0 | 1
(United States) C Martinez (United States) K Pigeon | 6 | 6
(United States) P Addie (United States) G Moran | 1 | 1
(United States) B Pratt (Australia) J Tegart | 7 | 4 | 4
1 | (United States) R Casals (United States) BJ King | 5 | 6 | 6

Quarterfinals
2 | (France) F Dürr (United Kingdom) A Jones | 6 | 6
(United States) K Harter (United States) J Heldman | 1 | 0
3 | (Brazil) M Bueno (Australia) M Court | 6 | 6
(United States) P Cody (United States) N Netter | 2 | 2
(United Kingdom) V Wade (United Kingdom) J Williams | 6 | 6
(Australia) K Krantzcke (United States) V Rogers | 4 | 4
(United States) C Martinez (United States) K Pigeon | 1 | 6
1 | (United States) R Casals (United States) BJ King | 6 | 8

Semifinals
2 | (France) F Dürr (United Kingdom) A Jones | 1 | 6
3 | (Brazil) M Bueno (Australia) M Court | 6 | 8
(United Kingdom) V Wade (United Kingdom) J Williams | 10 | 4
1 | (United States) R Casals (United States) BJ King | 12 | 6

Final
3 | (Brazil) M Bueno (Australia) M Court | 4 | 9 | 8
1 | (United States) R Casals (United States) BJ King | 6 | 7 | 6
