= 1968 US Open – Women's singles =

Women's singles
- 1968 US Open

Final
- Champion: (United Kingdom) Virginia Wade
- Runner-up: (United States) Billie Jean King
- Score: 6–4, 6–2

Details
- Draw: 64
- Seeds: 8

Events
Singles	men	women		boys	girls
Doubles	men	women	mixed	boys	girls
WC Singles	men	women	quad
WC Doubles	men	women	quad
Legends	men	women	mixed
← 1967 ·	US Open	· 1969 →

Virginia Wade defeated defending champion Billie Jean King in the final, 6–4, 6–2 to win the women's singles tennis title at the 1968 US Open. It was her first major singles title. This was the first edition of the US Open to be open to professional players, marking a period in tennis history known as the Open Era.

== Seeds ==
The seeded players are listed below. Virginia Wade is the champion; others show the round in which they were eliminated.

1. (United States) Billie Jean King (Runner-up)
2. (United Kingdom) Ann Jones (semifinals)
3. (Australia) Judy Tegart (quarterfinals)
4. (Australia) Margaret Court (quarterfinals)
5. (Brazil) Maria Bueno (semifinals)
6. (United Kingdom) Virginia Wade (champion)
7. (United States) Mary-Ann Eisel (first round)
8. (United States) Kristy Pigeon (second round)

== Draw ==
=== Key ===
- Q = Qualifier
- WC = Wild card
- LL = Lucky loser
- r = Retired

=== Finals ===
Quarterfinals
1	(United States) Billie Jean King	6	3	6
(South Africa) Maryna Godwin	3	6	3
4	(Australia) Margaret Court	5	6	3
5	(Brazil) Maria Bueno	7	2	6
6	(United Kingdom) Virginia Wade	6	6
3	(Australia) Judy Tegart	3	2
(United States) Peaches Bartkowicz	8	3
2	(United Kingdom) Ann Jones	10	6

Semifinals
1	(United States) Billie Jean King	3	6	6
5	(Brazil) Maria Bueno	6	4	2
6	(United Kingdom) Virginia Wade	7	6
2	(United Kingdom) Ann Jones	5	1

Finals
1	(United States) Billie Jean King	4	2
6	(United Kingdom) Virginia Wade	6	6

=== Earlier rounds ===
==== Section 1 ====
First round
1	(United States) King	6	6
(United States) Vuskalns	1	0
(United States) Tym	6	6
(United States) Footman	0	1
(United States) Carter	6	7
(United States) Capozzi	1	5
(United States) Lamm	3	9	6
(United States) Gengler	6	7	3
8	(United States) Pigeon	6	6
(United States) Moore	3	4
(South Africa) Godwin	6	6
(United States) Adams	4	2
(United States) Schiffman	5	6	7
(United States) Herrick	7	4	5
(United States) Harter	6	4	6
(United States) Netter	4	6	4

Second round
1	(United States) King	6	6
(United States) Tym	1	4
(United States) Carter	6	6
(United States) Lamm	4	2
8	(United States) Pigeon	5	4
(South Africa) Godwin	7	6
(United States) Schiffman	0	1
(United States) Harter	6	6

Third round
1	(United States) King	8	6
(United States) Carter	6	3
(South Africa) Godwin	2	7	6
(United States) Harter	6	5	3

Quarterfinals
1	(United States) King	6	3	6
(South Africa) Godwin	3	6	3

==== Section 2 ====
First round
4	(Australia) Court	6	6
(United States) Fisher	0	1
(United States) Heldman	6	6
(United States) Matzner	2	1
(United States) duPont	7	6
(United States) Lowdon	5	2
(France) Dürr	6	6
(United States) Ziegenfuss	0	1
5	(Brazil) Bueno	6	6
(United States) Grant	1	4
(United States) Martinez	6	6
(United States) Moore	4	4
(United States) Hogan	11	6
(United States) Lyman	9	3
(United States) Christenson	2	6	6
(Canada) O'Hara	6	3	4

Second round
4	(Australia) Court	4	6	6
(United States) Heldman	6	2	1
(United States) duPont	1	5
(France) Dürr	6	7
5	(Brazil) Bueno	2	6	6
(United States) Martinez	6	2	4
(United States) Hogan	6	6
(United States) Christenson	1	1

Third round
4	(Australia) Court	6	6
(France) Dürr	3	3
5	(Brazil) Bueno	0	6	6
(United States) Hogan	6	2	1

Quarterfinals
4	(Australia) Court	5	6	3
5	(Brazil) Bueno	7	2	6

==== Section 3 ====
First round
(United States) Casals	6	6
(United States) Aschner	3	2
(United States) Pratt	7	3	6
(United States) Austin	5	6	2
(United States) Cody	3	6	6
(United States) Bailey	6	1	3
6	(United Kingdom) Wade	6	3	6
(United States) De Fina	3	6	3
(United States) Tuero	6	6
(United States) Reed	1	1
(Australia) Krantzcke	6	6
(United States) Gonnerman	1	0
(United Kingdom) Maclennan	6	4	11
(United States) Kanarek	4	6	9
3	(Australia) Tegart	6	6
(United States) Dixon	0	1

Second round
(United States) Casals	6	6
(United States) Pratt	1	3
(United States) Cody	3	3
6	(United Kingdom) Wade	6	6
(United States) Tuero	6	1	7
(Australia) Krantzcke	4	6	5
(United Kingdom) Maclennan	0	2
3	(Australia) Tegart	6	6

Third round
(United States) Casals	4	5
6	(United Kingdom) Wade	6	7
(United States) Tuero	5	2
3	(Australia) Tegart	7	6

Quarterfinals
6	(United Kingdom) Wade	6	6
3	(Australia) Tegart	3	2

==== Section 4 ====
First round
(United States) Jones	6	6
(United States) Hunter	2	3
(United States) Overton	6	7
(United States) Davenport	3	5
(United States) Bartkowicz	6	6
(United States) Graebner	1	2
(United Kingdom) Williams	7	2	6
7	(United States) Eisel	5	6	4
(United States) Rogers	6	6
(United States) Vest	3	4
(South Africa) Rossouw
(France) Spinoza	w/o
(United States) Stewart	6	6
(United States) Kincaid	4	4
2	(United Kingdom) Jones	6	6
(United States) Teeguarden	3	1

Second round
(United States) Jones	4	15	2
(United States) Overton	6	13	6
(United States) Bartkowicz	7	6
(United Kingdom) Williams	5	2
(United States) Rogers	11	6
(South Africa) Rossouw	9	1
(United States) Stewart	1	0
2	(United Kingdom) Jones	6	6

Third round
(United States) Overton	3	2
(United States) Bartkowicz	6	6
(United States) Rogers	0	6	1
2	(United Kingdom) Jones	6	4	6

Quarterfinals
(United States) Bartkowicz	8	3
2	(United Kingdom) Jones	10	6

Preceded by 1968 Wimbledon Championships – Women's singles	Grand Slam women's singles	Succeeded by 1969 Australian Open – Women's singles
