= 1972 Wimbledon Championships – Mixed doubles =

Mixed doubles
- 1972 Wimbledon Championships

Final
- Champions: (Romania) Ilie Năstase (United States) Rosie Casals
- Runners-up: (Australia) Kim Warwick (Australia) Evonne Goolagong
- Score: 6–4, 6–4

Details
- Draw: 80 (3 Q )
- Seeds: 4

Events
Singles	men	women		boys	girls
Doubles	men	women	mixed	boys	girls
← 1971 ·	Wimbledon Championships	· 1973 →

Owen Davidson and Billie Jean King were the defending champions, but Davidson did not compete. King partnered with Clark Graebner but lost in the semifinals to Ilie Năstase and Rosie Casals.

Năstase and Casals defeated Kim Warwick and Evonne Goolagong in the final, 6–4, 6–4 to win the mixed doubles tennis title at the 1972 Wimbledon Championships.

== Seeds ==
1. (Australia) Kim Warwick / (Australia) Evonne Goolagong (final)
2. (Romania) Ilie Năstase / (United States) Rosie Casals (champions)
3. (United States) Clark Graebner / (United States) Billie Jean King (semifinals)
4. (South Africa) Frew McMillan / (Australia) Judy Dalton (quarterfinals)

Click on the seed number of a player to go to their draw section.

== Draw ==
=== Key ===
- Q = Qualifier
- WC = Wild card
- LL = Lucky loser
- Alt = Alternate
- SE = Special exempt
- PR = Protected ranking
- ITF = ITF entry
- JE = Junior exempt
- w/o = Walkover
- r = Retired
- d = Defaulted
- SR = Special ranking

=== Finals ===
Quarterfinals
1	(Australia) Kim Warwick (Australia) Evonne Goolagong	8	6	6
(Australia) Colin Dibley (Australia) Karen Krantzcke	9	2	2
4	(South Africa) Frew McMillan (Australia) Judy Dalton	6	7	4
(South Africa) Pat Cramer (South Africa) Pat Pretorius	0	9	6
(Chile) Patricio Cornejo (Colombia) Isabel Fernández de Soto
3	(United States) Clark Graebner (United States) Billie Jean King	w/o
(Rhodesia) Hank Irvine (Netherlands) Betty Stöve	0	4
2	(Romania) Ilie Năstase (United States) Rosie Casals	6	6

Semifinals
1	(Australia) Kim Warwick (Australia) Evonne Goolagong	6	6
(South Africa) Pat Cramer (South Africa) Pat Pretorius	4	3
3	(United States) Clark Graebner (United States) Billie Jean King	8	5
2	(Romania) Ilie Năstase (United States) Rosie Casals	9	7

Final
1	(Australia) Kim Warwick (Australia) Evonne Goolagong	4	4
2	(Romania) Ilie Năstase (United States) Rosie Casals	6	6

=== Top half ===
==== Section 1 ====
First round

Second round
1	(Australia) K Warwick (Australia) E Goolagong	9	6
(Australia) G Masters (Australia) B Hawcroft	7	3
(Greece) N Kalogeropoulos (Greece) C-A Kalogeropoulos	7	4	6
(Italy) S Palmieri (Netherlands) G Walhof	5	6	3
(United States) G Seewagen (United States) K Pigeon	9	6
(Australia) A McDonald (United States) P Hogan	8	3
(United Kingdom) K Wooldridge (United Kingdom) W Shaw	6	6
(Jamaica) R Russell (Australia) P Faulkner	3	4

Third round
1	(Australia) K Warwick (Australia) E Goolagong	6	6
(Greece) N Kalogeropoulos (Greece) C-A Kalogeropoulos	0	2
(United States) G Seewagen (United States) K Pigeon	6	2	6
(United Kingdom) K Wooldridge (United Kingdom) W Shaw	2	6	3

Fourth round
1	(Australia) K Warwick (Australia) E Goolagong	6	6
(United States) G Seewagen (United States) K Pigeon	3	4

==== Section 2 ====
First round

Second round
(United Kingdom) J Lloyd (United Kingdom) L Blachford	6	9
(Australia) J Bartlett (Canada) J O'Hara	4	8
(Soviet Union) A Metreveli (Soviet Union) O Morozova	6	6
(Belgium) B Mignot (Belgium) M Gurdal	2	3
(Australia) N Fraser (United Kingdom) V Wade	6	6
(South Africa) A Segal (Australia) J Hoad	4	2
(Australia) C Dibley (Australia) K Krantzcke	6	6
(Italy) F Bartoni (Italy) M Giorgi	0	3

Third round
(United Kingdom) J Lloyd (United Kingdom) L Blachford	3	4
(Soviet Union) A Metreveli (Soviet Union) O Morozova	6	6
(Australia) N Fraser (United Kingdom) V Wade	4	1
(Australia) C Dibley (Australia) K Krantzcke	6	6

Fourth round
(Soviet Union) A Metreveli (Soviet Union) O Morozova	4	6	7
(Australia) C Dibley (Australia) K Krantzcke	6	4	9

==== Section 3 ====
First round

Second round
4	(South Africa) F McMillan (Australia) J Dalton	7	6
(Soviet Union) T Kakulia (Soviet Union) M Kroschina	5	2
(Spain) A Muñoz (Spain) AM Estalella	5	1
(Chile) J Fillol (United Kingdom) E Truman	7	6
(New Zealand) O Parun (New Zealand) M Pryde	8	2
(United States) M Estep (United States) L Tuero	9	6
(South Africa) T Ryan (United States) K Blake	6	3	4
Q	(Canada) D McCormick (United States) P Cody	3	6	6

Third round
4	(South Africa) F McMillan (Australia) J Dalton	6	6
(Chile) J Fillol (United Kingdom) E Truman	1	2
(United States) M Estep (United States) L Tuero	6	4	8
Q	(Canada) D McCormick (United States) P Cody	4	6	6

Fourth round
4	(South Africa) F McMillan (Australia) J Dalton	6	6
(United States) M Estep (United States) L Tuero	3	1

==== Section 4 ====
First round
(Chile) P Rodríguez (Chile) M Rodríguez	1	9	3
Q	(Australia) E Ewert (Sweden) M Wikstedt	6	8	6
(France) J-C Barclay (France) F Dürr	6	6
(United Kingdom) J de Mendoza (United Kingdom) J Congdon	1	1
(South Africa) W Freer (Rhodesia) S Hudson-Beck	3	1
(South Africa) P Cramer (South Africa) P Pretorius	6	6
(Australia) G Perkins (Australia) K Harris	3	6	3
(Brazil) T Koch (Brazil) V-L Cleto	6	2	6
(Japan) J Kamiwazumi (Japan) K Sawamatsu	4	1
(United Kingdom) P Curtis (United States) W Overton	6	6
(South Africa) R Hewitt (South Africa) A Steenkamp	w/o
(Australia) J Cooper (Australia) W Gilchrist
(Soviet Union) S Likhachev (Soviet Union) E Birioukova	7	8
(United Kingdom) S Matthews (United Kingdom) S Holdsworth	5	6
(United States) E van Dillen (United States) C Evert	7	6
(South Africa) D Schroder (Australia) L Hunt	5	4

Second round
Q	(Australia) E Ewert (Sweden) M Wikstedt	6	2	1
(France) J-C Barclay (France) F Dürr	2	6	6
(South Africa) P Cramer (South Africa) P Pretorius	6	6
(Brazil) T Koch (Brazil) V-L Cleto	3	4
(United Kingdom) P Curtis (United States) W Overton	6	9
(South Africa) R Hewitt (South Africa) A Steenkamp	3	7
(Soviet Union) S Likhachev (Soviet Union) E Birioukova	3	5
(United States) E van Dillen (United States) C Evert	6	7

Third round
(France) J-C Barclay (France) F Dürr	3	3
(South Africa) P Cramer (South Africa) P Pretorius	6	6
(United Kingdom) P Curtis (United States) W Overton	4	5
(United States) E van Dillen (United States) C Evert	6	7

Fourth round
(South Africa) P Cramer (South Africa) P Pretorius	2	6	6
(United States) E van Dillen (United States) C Evert	6	4	4

=== Bottom half ===
==== Section 5 ====
First round
Q	(Australia) H Turnbull (Australia) W Turnbull	9	5	7
(Rhodesia) A Fawcett (Republic of Ireland) S Minford	7	7	5
(Australia) B Phillips-Moore (Australia) A Phillips-Moore	4	4
(United States) M Machette (United States) S Walsh	6	6
(United Kingdom) D Lloyd (United Kingdom) J Williams	6	6
(Pakistan) M Iqbal (United Kingdom) J Fayter	4	2
(Argentina) G Vilas (Argentina) R Giscafré	6	6
(United States) V Seixas (United States) B Davidson	1	2
(Chile) J Pinto Bravo (Chile) AM Pinto Bravo
(Rhodesia) A Pattison (South Africa) D Pattison	w/o
(United States) T Gorman (United States) V Ziegenfuss	w/o
(France) P Barthès (United States) P Teeguarden
(Mexico) R Ramírez (United States) J Newberry	6	4	5
(Chile) P Cornejo (Colombia) I Fernández de Soto	0	6	7
(Australia) G Thomson (Australia) V Lancaster	5	9	5
(United Kingdom) J Feaver (United Kingdom) V Burton	7	7	7

Second round
Q	(Australia) H Turnbull (Australia) W Turnbull	3	5
(United States) M Machette (United States) S Walsh	6	7
(United Kingdom) D Lloyd (United Kingdom) J Williams	6	6
(Argentina) G Vilas (Argentina) R Giscafré	3	2
(Rhodesia) A Pattison (South Africa) D Pattison	w/o
(United States) T Gorman (United States) V Ziegenfuss
(Chile) P Cornejo (Colombia) I Fernández de Soto	6	7
(United Kingdom) J Feaver (United Kingdom) V Burton	4	5

Third round
(United States) M Machette (United States) S Walsh	1	6
(United Kingdom) D Lloyd (United Kingdom) J Williams	6	8
(Rhodesia) A Pattison (South Africa) D Pattison	5	4
(Chile) P Cornejo (Colombia) I Fernández de Soto	7	6

Fourth round
(United Kingdom) D Lloyd (United Kingdom) J Williams	6	4	4
(Chile) P Cornejo (Colombia) I Fernández de Soto	4	6	6

==== Section 6 ====
First round

Second round
(Italy) P Marzano (South Africa) L Rossouw	5	6	3
(New Zealand) J McDonald (United Kingdom) R Bentley	7	2	6
(Australia) P Doerner (Australia) C Doerner	3	4
(Colombia) I Molina (Uruguay) F Bonicelli	6	6
(United States) E Scott (United States) M Gengler	6	6
(West Germany) H-J Plötz (West Germany) K Ebbinghaus	2	3
(Australia) R Case (Australia) M Morgan
3	(United States) C Graebner (United States) BJ King	w/o

Third round
(New Zealand) J McDonald (United Kingdom) R Bentley	5	4
(Colombia) I Molina (Uruguay) F Bonicelli	7	6
(United States) E Scott (United States) M Gengler	1	2
3	(United States) C Graebner (United States) BJ King	6	6

Fourth round
(Colombia) I Molina (Uruguay) F Bonicelli	7	1
3	(United States) C Graebner (United States) BJ King	9	6

==== Section 7 ====
First round

Second round
(United States) J Austin (United States) P Austin	6	6
(United States) R Dell (Sweden) I Bentzer	4	2
(United Kingdom) R Wilson (United Kingdom) S Brasher	2	7	4
(United Kingdom) J Paish (Austria) S Pachta	6	5	6
(India) A Amritraj (Australia) M Tesch	9	6
(Australia) J Moore (Australia) F Moore	8	4
(United Kingdom) P Hutchins (United States) C Martinez	5	5
(Rhodesia) H Irvine (Netherlands) B Stöve	7	7

Third round
(United States) J Austin (United States) P Austin	7	6
(United Kingdom) J Paish (Austria) S Pachta	5	1
(India) A Amritraj (Australia) M Tesch	2	4
(Rhodesia) H Irvine (Netherlands) B Stöve	6	6

Fourth round
(United States) J Austin (United States) P Austin	2	6	6
(Rhodesia) H Irvine (Netherlands) B Stöve	6	3	8

==== Section 8 ====
First round

Second round
(United Kingdom) J Clifton (United Kingdom) A Cowie	6	6
(United Kingdom) A Mills (United Kingdom) J Mills	4	4
(France) T Bernasconi (France) O de Roubin	5	3
(Australia) R Keldie (South Africa) E Emmanuel	7	6
(Brazil) JE Mandarino (Spain) C Mandarino	6	6	6
(India) V Amritraj (United Kingdom) L Charles	8	4	4
(Denmark) T Ulrich (United States) J Heldman	2	1
2	(Romania) I Năstase (United States) R Casals	6	6

Third round
(United Kingdom) J Clifton (United Kingdom) A Cowie	4	6	5
(Australia) R Keldie (South Africa) E Emmanuel	6	3	7
(Brazil) JE Mandarino (Spain) C Mandarino	1	3
2	(Romania) I Năstase (United States) R Casals	6	6

Fourth round
(Australia) R Keldie (South Africa) E Emmanuel	2	4
2	(Romania) I Năstase (United States) R Casals	6	6
