= 1972 Wimbledon Championships – Women's doubles =

Women's doubles
- 1972 Wimbledon Championships

Final
- Champions: (United States) Billie Jean King (Netherlands) Betty Stöve
- Runners-up: (Australia) Judy Dalton (France) Françoise Dürr
- Score: 6–2, 4–6, 6–3

Details
- Draw: 48 (3 Q )
- Seeds: 4

Events
Singles	men	women		boys	girls
Doubles	men	women	mixed	boys	girls
← 1971 ·	Wimbledon Championships	· 1973 →

Rosie Casals and Billie Jean King were the defending champions, but decided not to play together. Casals partnered with Virginia Wade but lost in the semifinals to Judy Dalton and Françoise Dürr.

King and her partner Betty Stöve defeated Dalton and Dürr in the final, 6–2, 4–6, 6–3 to win the ladies' doubles tennis title at the 1972 Wimbledon Championships.

== Seeds ==
1. (United States) Billie Jean King / (Netherlands) Betty Stöve (champions)
2. (United States) Rosie Casals / (United Kingdom) Virginia Wade (semifinals)
3. (Australia) Judy Dalton / (France) Françoise Dürr (final)
4. (Australia) Evonne Goolagong / (United Kingdom) Nell Truman (second round)

Click on the seed number of a player to go to their draw section.

== Draw ==
=== Key ===
- Q = Qualifier
- WC = Wild card
- LL = Lucky loser
- Alt = Alternate
- ITF = ITF entry
- PR = Protected ranking
- SR = Special ranking
- SE = Special exempt
- JE = Junior exempt
- JR = Junior Accelerator Programme entrant
- CO = College Accelerator Programme entrant
- NG = Next Gen Accelerator Program entrant
- w/o = Walkover
- r = Retired
- d = Defaulted

=== Finals ===
Quarterfinals
1	(United States) Billie Jean King (Netherlands) Betty Stöve	6	6
(Australia) Wendy Gilchrist (South Africa) Laura Rossouw	2	1
(United Kingdom) Winnie Shaw (United Kingdom) Joyce Williams	6	6	6
(South Africa) Esmé Emmanuel (United States) Ceci Martinez	8	3	0
(Uruguay) Fiorella Bonicelli (Colombia) Isabel Fernández de Soto	4	0
3	(Australia) Judy Dalton (France) Françoise Dürr	6	6
(Australia) Lesley Hunt (Soviet Union) Olga Morozova	3	2
2	(United States) Rosie Casals (United Kingdom) Virginia Wade	6	6

Semifinals
1	(United States) Billie Jean King (Netherlands) Betty Stöve	7	3	6
(United Kingdom) Winnie Shaw (United Kingdom) Joyce Williams	5	6	3
3	(Australia) Judy Dalton (France) Françoise Dürr	6	6
2	(United States) Rosie Casals (United Kingdom) Virginia Wade	4	1

Final
1	(United States) Billie Jean King (Netherlands) Betty Stöve	6	4	6
3	(Australia) Judy Dalton (France) Françoise Dürr	2	6	3

=== Top half ===
==== Section 1 ====
First round

Second round
1	(United States) BJ King (Netherlands) B Stöve	6	6
(Indonesia) L Kaligis (Indonesia) L Liem	3	1
(United States) D Carter-Triolo (United States) K Pigeon	6	6
(Canada) V Berner (Australia) P Faulkner	4	4
(United States) K Blake (United States) J Newberry	8	4	6
(Netherlands) A Bakker (Netherlands) M Schaar	6	6	4
(Australia) W Gilchrist (South Africa) L Rossouw	6	6
(United Kingdom) L Beaven (United Kingdom) V Burton	2	4

Third round
1	(United States) BJ King (Netherlands) B Stöve	6	6
(United States) D Carter-Triolo (United States) K Pigeon	1	1
(United States) K Blake (United States) J Newberry	6	4	4
(Australia) W Gilchrist (South Africa) L Rossouw	1	6	6

Quarterfinals
1	(United States) BJ King (Netherlands) B Stöve	6	6
(Australia) W Gilchrist (South Africa) L Rossouw	2	1

==== Section 2 ====
First round
4	(Australia) E Goolagong (United Kingdom) E Truman	6	6
(West Germany) K Ebbinghaus (Netherlands) G Walhof	1	4
(United States) W Overton (United States) V Ziegenfuss	4	3
(United Kingdom) W Shaw (United Kingdom) J Williams	6	6
Q	(United Kingdom) J Helliar (Australia) S Hole	6	7
Q	(United States) S Stap (United States) L Tenney	4	5
(United Kingdom) J Cooper (United Kingdom) C Molesworth	3	0
(United States) P Teeguarden (United States) L Tuero	6	6
(Australia) K Harris (Australia) K Melville	6	6
(United Kingdom) A Cowie (United Kingdom) S Holdsworth	2	1
(United States) C Evert (United States) C Graebner	2	6	3
(United States) L duPont (United States) M Schallau	6	3	6
(United States) J Heldman (United States) S Walsh	6	6
(Spain) AM Estalella (Spain) C Mandarino	4	2
(South Africa) E Emmanuel (United States) C Martinez	6	7	6
(Soviet Union) E Birioukova (Soviet Union) M Kroschina	2	9	4

Second round
4	(Australia) E Goolagong (United Kingdom) E Truman	5	1
(United Kingdom) W Shaw (United Kingdom) J Williams	7	6
Q	(United Kingdom) J Helliar (Australia) S Hole	7	2	6
(United States) P Teeguarden (United States) L Tuero	5	6	3
(Australia) K Harris (Australia) K Melville	7	6
(United States) L duPont (United States) M Schallau	5	4
(United States) J Heldman (United States) S Walsh	4	9	4
(South Africa) E Emmanuel (United States) C Martinez	6	7	6

Third round
(United Kingdom) W Shaw (United Kingdom) J Williams	6	6
Q	(United Kingdom) J Helliar (Australia) S Hole	3	2
(Australia) K Harris (Australia) K Melville	6	4	3
(South Africa) E Emmanuel (United States) C Martinez	3	6	6

Quarterfinals
(United Kingdom) W Shaw (United Kingdom) J Williams	6	6	6
(South Africa) E Emmanuel (United States) C Martinez	8	3	0

=== Bottom half ===
==== Section 3 ====
First round
(Czechoslovakia) M Neumannová (Czechoslovakia) V Vopičková	4	2
(Uruguay) F Bonicelli (Colombia) I Fernández de Soto	6	6
(Chile) M Rodríguez (France) O de Roubin	3	3
(Italy) M Giorgi (Italy) A-M Nasuelli	6	6
(United Kingdom) L Charles (United Kingdom) J Fayter	6	6
(United Kingdom) R Bentley (Australia) F Moore	2	3
(Australia) B Hawcroft (New Zealand) M Pryde	2	8
Q	(Republic of Ireland) G Barniville (United Kingdom) L Blachford	6	9
(France) G Chanfreau (France) R Darmon	6	2	3
(United States) J Anthony (United States) K Kemmer	3	6	6
(South Africa) B Kirk (South Africa) P Pretorius	2	6	6
(United Kingdom) S Brasher (United Kingdom) G Coles	6	2	4
(Australia) H Gourlay (Australia) K Krantzcke	6	6
(Australia) V Lancaster (Australia) M Morgan	4	2
(Sweden) I Bentzer (Sweden) C Sandberg	2	1
3	(Australia) J Dalton (France) F Dürr	6	6

Second round
(Uruguay) F Bonicelli (Colombia) I Fernández de Soto	6	3	6
(Italy) M Giorgi (Italy) A-M Nasuelli	0	6	3
(United Kingdom) L Charles (United Kingdom) J Fayter	6	6
Q	(Republic of Ireland) G Barniville (United Kingdom) L Blachford	4	4
(United States) J Anthony (United States) K Kemmer	9	8	6
(South Africa) B Kirk (South Africa) P Pretorius	8	9	4
(Australia) H Gourlay (Australia) K Krantzcke	5	2
3	(Australia) J Dalton (France) F Dürr	7	6

Third round
(Uruguay) F Bonicelli (Colombia) I Fernández de Soto	6	6
(United Kingdom) L Charles (United Kingdom) J Fayter	3	3
(United States) J Anthony (United States) K Kemmer	2	5
3	(Australia) J Dalton (France) F Dürr	6	7

Quarterfinals
(Uruguay) F Bonicelli (Colombia) I Fernández de Soto	4	0
3	(Australia) J Dalton (France) F Dürr	6	6

==== Section 4 ====
First round

Second round
(Rhodesia) S Hudson-Beck (Republic of Ireland) S Minford	4	6	6
(Australia) P Coleman (Australia) W Turnbull	6	1	3
(Australia) L Hunt (Soviet Union) O Morozova	6	6
(Austria) S Pachta (West Germany) C Schediwy	0	1
(France) N Fuchs (Chile) AM Pinto Bravo	6	6
(United States) W Appleby (United States) T O'Shaughnessy	2	2
(Ecuador) ME Guzmán (Rhodesia) D Pattison	0	0
2	(United States) R Casals (United Kingdom) V Wade	6	6

Third round
(Rhodesia) S Hudson-Beck (Republic of Ireland) S Minford	2	2
(Australia) L Hunt (Soviet Union) O Morozova	6	6
(France) N Fuchs (Chile) AM Pinto Bravo
2	(United States) R Casals (United Kingdom) V Wade	w/o

Quarterfinals
(Australia) L Hunt (Soviet Union) O Morozova	3	2
2	(United States) R Casals (United Kingdom) V Wade	6	6
