= 1968 in tennis =

This page covers all the important events in the sport of tennis in 1968. It provides the results of notable tournaments throughout the year on both the ATP and WTA Tours, the Davis Cup, and the Fed Cup.

== Australian Open ==
Category	Champion(s)	Finalist(s)	Score
Men's singles	(Australia) William Bowrey	(Spain) Juan Gisbert Sr.	7–5, 2–6, 9–7, 6–4 (Note: It was Bowrey's only Grand Slam title.)
Women's singles	(United States) Billie Jean King	(Australia) Margaret Court	6–1, 6–2 (Note: It was King's 13th Grand Slam title.)
Men's doubles	(Australia) Dick Crealy (Australia) Allan Stone	(Australia) Terry Addison (Australia) Ray Keldie	10–8, 6–4, 6–3 (Note: It was Crealy's 1st Grand Slam title. It was Stone's 1st Grand Slam title.)
Women's doubles	(Australia) Karen Krantzcke (Australia) Kerry Melville	(Australia) Judy Tegart (Australia) Lesley Turner	6–4, 3–6, 6–2 (Note: It was Krantzcke's only Grand Slam title. It was Melville's 1st Grand Slam title.)
Mixed doubles	(Australia) Dick Crealy (United States) Billie Jean King	(Australia) Allan Stone (Australia) Margaret Court	by walkover (Note: It was Crealy's 2nd Grand Slam title. It was King's 14th Grand Slam title.)

== French Open ==
Category	Champion(s)	Finalist(s)	Score
Men's singles	(Australia) Ken Rosewall	(Australia) Rod Laver	6–3, 6–1, 2–6, 6–2 (Note: It was Rosewall's 5th career Grand Slam title and his 2nd French Open title.)
Women's singles	(United States) Nancy Richey	(United Kingdom) Ann Haydon-Jones	5–7, 6–4, 6–1 (Note: It was Richey's 2nd and last career Grand Slam title and her only French Open title.)
Men's doubles	(Australia) Ken Rosewall (Australia) Fred Stolle	(Australia) Roy Emerson (Australia) Rod Laver	6–3, 6–4, 6–3 (Note: It was Rosewall's 12th career Grand Slam title and his 4th and last French Open title. It was Stolle's 14th career Grand Slam title and his 3rd and last French Open title.)
Women's doubles	(France) Françoise Dürr (United Kingdom) Ann Haydon-Jones	(United States) Rosemary Casals (United States) Billie Jean King	7–5, 4–6, 6–4 (Note: It was Dürr's 3rd career Grand Slam title and her 3rd French Open title. It was Haydon-Jones' 4th career Grand Slam title and her 4th French Open title.)
Mixed doubles	(France) Françoise Dürr (France) Jean-Claude Barclay	(United States) Billie Jean King (Australia) Owen Davidson	6–1, 6–4 (Note: It was Durr's 4th career Grand Slam title and her 4th French Open title. It was Barclay's 1st career Grand Slam title and his 1st French Open title.)
Boys' singles	(Australia) Phil Dent	(Australia) John Alexander	6–3, 3–6, 7–5
Girls' singles	(Australia) Lesley Hunt	(Soviet Union) Eugenia Isopaitis	6–4, 6–2

== Wimbledon ==
Category	Champion(s)	Finalist(s)	Score
Men's singles	(Australia) Rod Laver	(Australia) Tony Roche	6–3, 6–4, 6–2
Women's singles	(United States) Billie Jean King	(Australia) Judy Tegart	9–7, 7–5
Men's doubles	(Australia) John Newcombe (Australia) Tony Roche	(Australia) Ken Rosewall (Australia) Fred Stolle	3–6, 8–6, 5–7, 14–12, 6–3
Women's doubles	(United States) Rosie Casals (United States) Billie Jean King	(France) Françoise Dürr (United Kingdom) Ann Jones	3–6, 6–4, 7–5
Mixed doubles	(Australia) Ken Fletcher (Australia) Margaret Court	(Soviet Union) Alex Metreveli (Soviet Union) Olga Morozova	6–1, 14–12

== US Open ==
Category	Champion(s)	Finalist(s)	Score
Men's singles	(United States) Arthur Ashe	(Netherlands) Tom Okker,	14–12, 5–7, 6–3, 3–6, 6–3 (Note: It was Ashe's 1st career Grand Slam singles title and his 1st and only at the US Open.)
Women's singles	(United Kingdom) Virginia Wade	(United States) Billie Jean King	6–4, 6–2 (Note: It was Wade's 1st career Grand Slam singles title and her 1st and only at the US Open.)
Men's doubles	(United States) Bob Lutz (United States) Stan Smith	(United States) Arthur Ashe (Spain) Andrés Gimeno,	11–9, 6–1, 7–5 (Note: It was Lutz's 1st career Grand Slam doubles title.) (Note: It was Smith's 1st career Grand Slam doubles title.)
Women's doubles	(Brazil) Maria Bueno (Australia) Margaret Court	(United States) Rosemary Casals (United States) Billie Jean King	4–6, 9–7, 8–6 (Note: It was Bueno's 11th and last career Grand Slam doubles title and her 4th at the US Open.) (Note: It was Court's 10th career Grand Slam doubles title and her 2nd at the US)
