= 1970 US Open – Women's singles =

Women's singles
- 1970 US Open

Final
- Champion: (Australia) Margaret Court
- Runner-up: (United States) Rosie Casals
- Score: 6–2, 2–6, 6–1

Details
- Draw: 64
- Seeds: 8

Events
Singles	men	women		boys	girls
Doubles	men	women	mixed	boys	girls
WC Singles	men	women	quad
WC Doubles	men	women	quad
Legends	men	women	mixed
← 1969 ·	US Open	· 1971 →

Defending champion Margaret Court defeated Rosie Casals in the final, 6–2, 2–6, 6–1 to win the women's singles tennis title at the 1970 US Open. With the win, Court completed the Grand Slam, the first woman in the Open Era to do so in singles. It was her fourth US singles title and record 20th major singles title, surpassing Helen Wills' all-time tally.

== Seeds ==
1. (Australia) Margaret Court (champion)
2. (United States) Rosie Casals (final)
3. (United States) Nancy Richey (semifinals)
4. (France) Françoise Dürr (quarterfinals)
5. (United Kingdom) Virginia Wade (semifinals)
6. (Australia) Kerry Melville (quarterfinals)
7. (Australia) Karen Krantzcke (withdrew before the tournament began)
8. (Australia) Judy Dalton (third round)

== Draw ==
=== Key ===
- Q = Qualifier
- WC = Wild card
- LL = Lucky loser
- Alt = Alternate
- ITF = ITF entry
- PR = Protected ranking
- SR = Special ranking
- SE = Special exempt
- JE = Junior exempt
- JR = Junior Accelerator Programme entrant
- CO = College Accelerator Programme entrant
- NG = Next Gen Accelerator Program entrant
- w/o = Walkover
- r = Retired
- d = Defaulted

=== Finals ===
Quarterfinals
1	(Australia) Margaret Court	6	6
(Australia) Helen Gourlay	2	2
3	(United States) Nancy Richey	6	6
(Australia) Lesley Hunt	4	4
5	(United Kingdom) Virginia Wade	5	6	6
4	(France) Françoise Dürr	7	4	0
6	(Australia) Kerry Melville	4	6	4
2	(United States) Rosie Casals	6	4	6

Semifinals
1	(Australia) Margaret Court	6	6
3	(United States) Nancy Richey	1	3
5	(United Kingdom) Virginia Wade	2	7	2
2	(United States) Rosie Casals	6	6	6

Final
1	(Australia) Margaret Court	6	2	6
2	(United States) Rosie Casals	2	6	1

=== Top half ===
==== Section 1 ====
First round
1	(Australia) M Court	6	6
(United States) P Austin	1	0
(United States) P Hogan	7	3	6
(United States) J Newberry	5	6	1
(Australia) T Faulkner	6	5	6
(Japan) C Murakami	2	7	4
(United States) P Stewart	6	2	0
(United States) M Gengler	3	6	6
(United States) M Cooper	4	2
(Australia) H Gourlay	6	6
(United States) C Graebner	6	6
(United States) L Tenney	2	3
(United States) B-A Hansen	5	4
(United States) K Pigeon	7	6
(United States) P Reese	1	2
8	(Australia) J Dalton	6	6

Second round
1	(Australia) M Court	6	6
(United States) P Hogan	1	1
(Australia) T Faulkner	6	6
(United States) M Gengler	3	4
(Australia) H Gourlay	6	7
(United States) C Graebner	3	5
(United States) K Pigeon	6	6	4
8	(Australia) J Dalton	7	0	6

Third round
1	(Australia) M Court	6	6
(Australia) T Faulkner	0	2
(Australia) H Gourlay	6	6
8	(Australia) J Dalton	4	2

Quarterfinals
1	(Australia) M Court	6	6
(Australia) H Gourlay	2	2

==== Section 2 ====
First round
3	(United States) N Richey	6	6
(United States) L duPont	2	3
(France) G Chanfreau	6	3	6
(United States) D Carter	3	6	3
(United Kingdom) S Holdsworth	1	5
(United States) S Johnson	6	7
(Indonesia) L Liem	7	4	1
(Soviet Union) O Morozova	5	6	6
(Chile) M Rodríguez
(Sweden) C Sandberg	w	/	o
(Ecuador) ME Guzmán
(United States) C Capozzi	w	/	o
(Australia) L Hunt	6	6
(United States) K Kemmer	3	1
(United States) P Farmer
(United States) P Cody	w	/	o

Second round
3	(United States) N Richey	6	6
(France) G Chanfreau	3	3
(United States) S Johnson	1	3
(Soviet Union) O Morozova	6	6
(Sweden) C Sandberg	6	6
(United States) C Capozzi	2	2
(Australia) L Hunt	6	6
(United States) P Cody	1	3

Third round
3	(United States) N Richey	7	2	6
(Soviet Union) O Morozova	5	6	2
(Sweden) C Sandberg	4	3
(Australia) L Hunt	6	6

Quarterfinals
3	(United States) N Richey	6	6
(Australia) L Hunt	4	4

=== Bottom half ===
==== Section 3 ====
First round
5	(United Kingdom) V Wade	6	6
(United States) T O'Shaughnessy	1	1
(Sweden) I Bentzer	2	2
(United States) P Bartkowicz	6	6
(United States) D Hard	3	6	6
(United States) V Ziegenfuss	6	4	4
(United States) S Walsh	6	4	6
(South Africa) E Emmanuel	1	6	2
(United States) M Struthers	4	6	2
(United States) F Footman	6	4	6
(Canada) J O'Hara	6	6	6
(Indonesia) L Kaligis	7	2	3
(United Kingdom) N Truman	6	6
(United States) S Vinton	2	0
(United States) M-A Curtis	5	0
4	(France) Dürr	7	6

Second round
5	(United Kingdom) V Wade	7	6
(United States) P Bartkowicz	6	1
(United States) D Hard	6	1	5
(United States) S Walsh	3	6	7
(United States) F Footman	6	6
(Canada) J O'Hara	7	7
(United Kingdom) N Truman	1	0
4	(France) Dürr	6	6

Third round
5	(United Kingdom) V Wade	6	6	6
(United States) S Walsh	3	7	1
(Canada) J O'Hara	1	1
4	(France) Dürr	6	6

Quarterfinals
5	(United Kingdom) V Wade	5	6	6
4	(France) Dürr	7	4	0

==== Section 4 ====
First round
6	(Australia) K Melville	6	6
(United States) B Vest	2	2
(United States) S Stap	6	6
(United States) S Barman	0	1
(United States) L Tuero	5	6	5
(South Africa) P Walkden	7	3	7
(United States) E Pande	6	6
(United Kingdom) C Molesworth	4	3
(United States) P Teeguarden	6	6
(Australia) K Harris	1	2
(United States) G Hansen	5	4
(United States) K Harter	7	6
(Soviet Union) M Kroschina	3	4
(United States) C Martinez	6	6
(France) C Spinoza	3	0
2	(United States) R Casals	6	6

Second round
6	(Australia) K Melville	6	7
(United States) S Stap	4	5
(South Africa) P Walkden	6	6
(United States) E Pande	4	1
(United States) P Teeguarden	6	6
(United States) K Harter	1	4
(United States) C Martinez	0	3
2	(United States) R Casals	6	6

Third round
6	(Australia) K Melville	7	7
(South Africa) P Walkden	6	5
(United States) P Teeguarden	5	4
2	(United States) R Casals	7	6

Quarterfinals
6	(Australia) K Melville	4	6	4
2	(United States) R Casals	6	4	6

Preceded by 1970 Wimbledon Championships – Women's singles	Grand Slam women's singles	Succeeded by 1971 Australian Open – Women's singles
