= 1970 Wimbledon Championships – Women's singles =

Women's singles
- 1970 Wimbledon Championships

Final
- Champion: (Australia) Margaret Court
- Runner-up: (United States) Billie Jean King
- Score: 14–12, 11–9

Details
- Draw: 96 (8 Q )
- Seeds: 8

Events
Singles	men	women		boys	girls
Doubles	men	women	mixed	boys	girls
← 1969 ·	Wimbledon Championships	· 1971 →

Margaret Court defeated Billie Jean King in the final, 14–12, 11–9 to win the ladies' singles tennis title at the 1970 Wimbledon Championships. It was her third Wimbledon singles title and 19th major singles title overall. Court was the first woman to complete the career Grand Slam in the Open Era, and would win the 1970 US Open to become the first woman in the Open Era to complete the Grand Slam.

Ann Jones was the reigning champion, but she had retired from major singles competition.

== Seeds ==
1. (Australia) Margaret Court (champion)
2. (United States) Billie Jean King (final)
3. (United Kingdom) Virginia Wade (fourth round)
4. (Australia) Kerry Melville (fourth round)
5. (United States) Rosie Casals (semifinals)
6. (United States) Julie Heldman (fourth round)
7. (Australia) Karen Krantzcke (quarterfinals)
8. (West Germany) Helga Niessen (quarterfinals)

Click on the seed number of a player to go to their draw section.

== Draw ==
=== Key ===
- Q = Qualifier
- WC = Wild card
- LL = Lucky loser
- Alt = Alternate
- ITF = ITF entry
- PR = Protected ranking
- SR = Special ranking
- SE = Special exempt
- JE = Junior exempt
- JR = Junior Accelerator Programme entrant
- CO = College Accelerator Programme entrant
- NG = Next Gen Accelerator Program entrant
- w/o = Walkover
- r = Retired
- d = Defaulted

=== Finals ===
Quarterfinals
1	(Australia) Margaret Court	6	6	6
8	(West Germany) Helga Niessen	8	0	0
(United Kingdom) Winnie Shaw	2	0
5	(United States) Rosie Casals	6	6
(France) Françoise Dürr	6	6
(United States) Ceci Martinez	0	4
7	(Australia) Karen Krantzcke	6	3	2
2	(United States) Billie Jean King	3	6	6

Semifinals
1	(Australia) Margaret Court	6	6
5	(United States) Rosie Casals	4	1
(France) Françoise Dürr	3	5
2	(United States) Billie Jean King	6	7

Final
1	(Australia) Margaret Court	14	11
2	(United States) Billie Jean King	12	9

=== Top half ===
==== Section 1 ====
First round

Second round
1	(Australia) M Court	6	6
Q	(Australia) S Alexander	0	1
(Ecuador) ME Guzmán	4	6	6
(Sweden) I Bentzer	6	3	3
(United Kingdom) R Lloyd	0	3
(Czechoslovakia) V Vopičková	6	6
(United Kingdom) J Cooper	6	6
(United Kingdom) C Molesworth	1	3

Third round
1	(Australia) M Court	6	6
(Ecuador) ME Guzmán	0	1
(Czechoslovakia) V Vopičková	5	10	6
(United Kingdom) J Cooper	7	8	2

Fourth round
1	(Australia) M Court	6	6
(Czechoslovakia) V Vopičková	3	3

==== Section 2 ====
First round

Second round
8	(West Germany) H Niessen	6	6
(Argentina) AM Arias	3	0
(France) É Terras	4	6	6
(United States) G Hansen	6	0	8
(West Germany) H Orth	7	4	9
(Netherlands) A Bakker	5	6	11
(United States) P Teeguarden	6	6	1
(United States) BA Grubb	4	8	6

Third round
8	(West Germany) H Niessen	8	6
(United States) G Hansen	6	1
(Netherlands) A Bakker	5	2
(United States) BA Grubb	7	6

Fourth round
8	(West Germany) H Niessen	6	6
(United States) BA Grubb	1	3

==== Section 3 ====
First round
4	(Australia) K Melville	6	6
(United Kingdom) J Townsend	4	1
(Hungary) J Szörényi	2	3
(Soviet Union) O Morozova	6	6
(South Africa) M Brummer	6	6
Q	(Canada) J O'Hara	4	3
LL	(United Kingdom) M Greenwood	6	6
(Australia) P Edwards	0	3
(Czechoslovakia) A Palmeová	6	6
(Brazil) S Petersen	2	3
(United Kingdom) A Cowie	3	2
(United States) M Michel	6	6
(United Kingdom) W Shaw	6	4	6
(Australia) K Harris	3	6	3
(United States) S Johnson	5	4
(Australia) L Hunt	7	6

Second round
4	(Australia) K Melville	11	7
(Soviet Union) O Morozova	9	5
(South Africa) M Brummer	6	7
LL	(United Kingdom) M Greenwood	4	5
(Czechoslovakia) A Palmeová	0	0
(United States) M Michel	6	6
(United Kingdom) W Shaw	6	6
(Australia) L Hunt	4	2

Third round
4	(Australia) K Melville	6	3	6
(South Africa) M Brummer	4	6	2
(United States) M Michel	3	0
(United Kingdom) W Shaw	6	6

Fourth round
4	(Australia) K Melville	2	4
(United Kingdom) W Shaw	6	6

==== Section 4 ====
First round
5	(United States) R Casals	8	6
(United States) K Harter	6	1
(United States) W Overton	6	7
(Australia) A Crooke	3	5
(Italy) A-M Nasuelli	0	2
(South Africa) L Rossouw	6	6
(Rhodesia) P Walkden	3	6	3
(United States) D Carter	6	3	6
(United Kingdom) S Brasher	9	6
Q	(New Zealand) M Pryde	7	0
(South Africa) J Wilshere	4	6	3
(United Kingdom) L Beaven	6	2	6
Q	(Japan) C Murakami	8	6	8
(France) C Spinoza	10	2	6
(Sweden) C Sandberg	10	6
Q	(United Kingdom) J Fayter	8	0

Second round
5	(United States) R Casals	6	6
(United States) W Overton	3	1
(South Africa) L Rossouw	3	3
(United States) D Carter	6	6
(United Kingdom) S Brasher	6	6
(United Kingdom) L Beaven	4	4
Q	(Japan) C Murakami	2	2
(Sweden) C Sandberg	6	6

Third round
5	(United States) R Casals	6	8
(United States) D Carter	3	6
(United Kingdom) S Brasher	4	9	4
(Sweden) C Sandberg	6	7	6

Fourth round
5	(United States) R Casals	6	6
(Sweden) C Sandberg	1	0

=== Bottom half ===
==== Section 5 ====
First round
(United States) S Walsh	8	6
(United States) P Hogan	6	3
(Australia) H Gourlay	6	2	6
(Indonesia) L Liem	0	6	4
(Czechoslovakia) M Neumannová	5	6	3
(United States) M-A Curtis	7	4	6
(Indonesia) L Kaligis	2	3
(France) F Dürr	6	6
(United States) V Ziegenfuss	7	6
Q	(Australia) S Walsham	5	2
(South Africa) D Botha	3	4
(Netherlands) G Walhof	6	6
(Australia) H Amos	6	6
(Italy) M Giorgi	0	2
(Australia) F Moore	2	1
6	(United States) J Heldman	6	6

Second round
(United States) S Walsh	6	6
(Australia) H Gourlay	2	4
(United States) M-A Curtis	1	4
(France) F Dürr	6	6
(United States) V Ziegenfuss	6	7
(Netherlands) G Walhof	4	5
(Australia) H Amos	4	2
6	(United States) J Heldman	6	6

Third round
(United States) S Walsh	5	1
(France) F Dürr	7	6
(United States) V Ziegenfuss	3	2
6	(United States) J Heldman	6	6

Fourth round
(France) F Dürr	6	6
6	(United States) J Heldman	2	4

==== Section 6 ====
First round
(United States) C Martinez	6	6
(Japan) K Hatanaka	2	0
(United States) P Cody	1	8	6
(South Africa) W Tomlinson	6	6	2
(United Kingdom) W Hall	1	1
(United Kingdom) R Bentley	6	6
(United Kingdom) V Burton	2	9	6
(Soviet Union) E Isopaitis	6	7	4
(France) O de Roubin	1	2
(Australia) E Goolagong	6	6
(United States) J Bartkowicz	3	9	6
(United States) K Pigeon	6	7	1
(South Africa) B Kirk	6	3	4
(South Africa) A du Plooy	2	6	6
Q	(United Kingdom) S Holdsworth	1	4
3	(United Kingdom) V Wade	6	6

Second round
(United States) C Martinez	6	6
(United States) P Cody	3	1
(United Kingdom) R Bentley	8	1	10
(United Kingdom) V Burton	6	6	8
(Australia) E Goolagong	4	0
(United States) J Bartkowicz	6	6
(South Africa) A du Plooy	4	5
3	(United Kingdom) V Wade	6	7

Third round
(United States) C Martinez	9	9
(United Kingdom) R Bentley	7	7
(United States) J Bartkowicz	4	4
3	(United Kingdom) V Wade	6	6

Fourth round
(United States) C Martinez	6	6
3	(United Kingdom) V Wade	1	4

==== Section 7 ====
First round

Second round
(United Kingdom) J Williams	3	2
(France) G Chanfreau	6	6
(Australia) J Dalton	6	6
(United Kingdom) S Northen	0	0
Q	(Australia) F Luff	1	2
(Japan) K Sawamatsu	6	6
(United Kingdom) E Truman	1	8	5
7	(Australia) K Krantzcke	6	6	7

Third round
(France) G Chanfreau	2	0
(Australia) J Dalton	6	6
(Japan) K Sawamatsu	2	3
7	(Australia) K Krantzcke	6	6

Fourth round
(Australia) J Dalton	4	3
7	(Australia) K Krantzcke	6	6

==== Section 8 ====
First round

Second round
(Italy) L Pericoli	6	7
(United Kingdom) E Ernest	4	5
(United States) C Graebner	5	7	3
(South Africa) E Emmanuel	7	5	6
(Netherlands) M Schaar	6	3	9
(Netherlands) B Stöve	2	6	7
(Uruguay) F Bonicelli	2	1
2	(United States) BJ King	6	6

Third round
(Italy) L Pericoli	6	6
(South Africa) E Emmanuel	2	2
(Netherlands) M Schaar	4	0
2	(United States) BJ King	6	6

Fourth round
(Italy) L Pericoli	1	2
2	(United States) BJ King	6	6

Preceded by 1970 French Open – Women's singles	Grand Slam women's singles	Succeeded by 1970 US Open – Women's singles
