= San Jose State All-Comers Championship =

Defunct tennis tournament
- Tour: ILTF World Circuit (1956–1972); ILTF Independent Circuit (1973–1976)
- Founded: 1956; 70 years ago
- Abolished: 1976; 50 years ago
- Location: San Jose, California; Los Gatos
- Venue: Blossom Hill Tennis Club; Spartan Tennis Complex, San Jose State University
- Surface: Hard / outdoor

The San Jose State All-Comers Championship and also known as the California State All-Comers Championship and later known as the Monarch Matches Open (for sponsorship reasons) was a combined men's and women's hard court tennis tournament founded in 1956 as the San Jose All-Comers Tennis Tournament.

The tournament was first played at the Spartan Tennis Complex, San Jose State University, San Jose, California, United States and ran annually until 1976 when it was discontinued as part of the ILTF Independent Circuit.

== History ==
In 1956 the first San Jose All-Comers Tennis Tournament was held. The event was played annually on outdoor hard courts at the Spartan Tennis Complex
San Jose State University, San Jose, California, United States. It initially ran annually as part of the ILTF North American Circuit, a global regional sub circuit of the ILTF World Circuit from 1956 to 1969 for men, then 1972 for women before it then became part of the ILTF Independent Circuit (those events not part of the men's ILTF Grand Prix Circuit or women's Virginia Slims Circuit in 1973 the year the tournament was moved to the Blossom Hill Tennis Club in Los Gatos. In 1975 the Monarch Match Co of San Jose, California (a subsidiary of Gulf and Western Industries, Inc.) undertook a two-year sponsorship deal of the tournament and it was rebranded as the Monarch Matches Open offering $3,600 prize money. In 1976 the tournament was discontinued when it failed to find a new sponsor.

== Finals ==
=== Men's singles ===
(incomplete roll)

Year	Champions	Runners-up	Score
↓ ILTF World Circuit ↓
1956	(United States) Cliff Vickery	(United States) Chet Bulwa	10–8, 6–2.
1959	(United States) Conway Catton	(United States) Chet Bulwa	6–3, 6–2
1966	(United States) Don Gale	(United States) Whitney Reed	6–2, 6–3
1967	(United States) Greg Shephard	(United States) Rich Anderson	6–4, 6–3.
1968	(United States) Greg Shephard	(United States) Rich Anderson	6–1, 8–6
↓ Open Era ↓
1969	(United States) Erik van Dillen	(United States) Robert Potthast	6–1, 8–6
1970	(United States) Barry MacKay	(United States) Rich Anderson	12–10, 8–6
1971	(United States) Dan Bleckinger	(United States) Charles Hoeveler	6–4, 6–7, 7–6
1972	(United States) William (Bill) Brown	(United States) Dan Bleckinger	4–6, 6–4, 6–4
1973	(United States) Butch Walts	(United States) Bob Siska	7–5, 7–6
1974	(United States) Matt Mitchell	(United States) Steve Cornell	6–4, 6–4

=== Women's singles ===
(incomplete roll)

Year	Champions	Runners-up	Score
↓ ILTF World Circuit ↓
1966	(United States) Pixie Lamm	(United States) Toni Alford	6–0, 6–1`
1967	(United States) Tina Lyman	(United States) Denise Carter	2–6, 8–6, 7–5
1968	(United States) Gail Hansen	(United States) Denise Carter	6–4, 7–5
↓ Open Era ↓
1970	(United States) Barbara Downs	(United States) Farel Footman	6–2, 8–6
1971	(United States) Eliza Pande	(United States) Barbara Downs	6–2, 8–6
1972	(United States) Kate Latham	(United States) Marcie O'Keffe	6–4, 6–1
1973	(United States) Kate Latham	(United States) Marcie O'Keffe	6–1, 6–1
1974	(United States) Denise Triola	(United States) Susan Mehmedbasich	6–4, 6–4
1976	(United States) Peanut Louie Harper	(Denmark) Helle Sparre	6–4, 2–6, 6–3
