= Royal Palm Invitational =

Defunct tennis tournament
- Tour: ILTF World Circuit (1960–1969) men (1960–1972 (women); ILTF Independent Circuit (1970–1977) men (1973–1977 (women)
- Founded: 1960; 65 years ago
- Abolished: 1977; 48 years ago
- Location: Miami, Florida United States
- Venue: Royal Palm Tennis Club
- Surface: Clay / outdoor

The Royal Palm Invitational was a men's and women's clay court tennis tournament founded in 1960. The event was played at the Royal Palm Tennis Club (founded 1960), Miami, Florida United States until 1977.

== Finals ==
=== Men's singles ===
(incomplete roll)

Year	Champions	Runners-up	Score
1960	(United States) Ron Holmberg	(West Germany) Wolfgang Stuck	2–6, 6–2, 8–6.
1961	(United States) John Karabasz	(United States) Frank Froehling III	7–5, 6–3.
1962	(United States) Frank Froehling III	(United States) Gardnar Mulloy	6–2, 4–6, 6–4.
1965	(Brazil) José Edison Mandarino	(France) Pierre Barthès	6–3, 7–5, 6–3.
1966	(Spain) Manuel Santana	(Costa Rica) Luis Rojas	8–6, 6–3, 6–3.
1967	(South Africa) Pat Cramer	(United States) Hugh Quinn	6–3, 6–4.
1968	(United States) Mac Claflin	(United States) David Harum	6–3, 6–1.
↓ Open Era ↓
1969	(United States) Frank Froehling III	(United States) Eddie Dibbs	6–0, 6–0.
1970	(South Africa) Rod Mandelstam	(United States) David Harum	6–3, 6–3.
1971	(Spain) Manuel Orantes	(United States) Eddie Dibbs	6–4, 1–6, 6–0.
1977	(United States) Paul Visneskey	(United States) Roy Coopersmith	6–4, 7–6.

=== Women's singles ===
(incomplete roll)

Year	Champions	Runners-up	Score
1967	(Mexico) Elena Subirats	(Argentina) Norma Baylon	6–4, 6–4.
1968	(South Africa) Esmé Emmanuel	(United States) Ceci Martinez	7–5, 6–4.
↓ Open Era ↓
1969	(United States) Stephanie DeFina	(United States) Tory Ann Fretz	6–4, 7–5.
1970	(United States) Susan Epstein	(United States) Donna Floyd Fales	6–4, 6–1.
