= Patricia Cody =

American tennis player

- Country (sports): United States
- Born: January 9, 1940 Los Angeles, California
- Died: August 24, 2004 (aged 64)

Singles

Grand Slam singles results
- Wimbledon: 2R (1970)
- US Open: 2R (1965, 1967, 1968, 1970)

Doubles

Grand Slam doubles results
- US Open: QF (1968)

Grand Slam mixed doubles results
- Wimbledon: 3R (1972)

Patricia Cody (January 9, 1940 – August 24, 2004) was an American tennis player.

== Education ==
A Los Angeles native, Cody attended Huntington Park High School and was almost 18 years of age when she started playing tennis. She had quick success, winning the Southern California Junior College championship in 1959.

== Career ==
During the 1960s she made appearances at the U.S National Championships and was a doubles quarter-finalist in 1968, when the tournament became the US Open.

Cody made the singles second round at Wimbledon in 1970 and the third round of the mixed doubles in 1972.
