= 1971 South African Open (tennis) =

- Date: 5–17 April
- Edition: 68th
- Category: Independent tour
- Draw: 32S
- Surface: Hard / outdoor
- Location: Johannesburg, South Africa
- Venue: Ellis Park Tennis Stadium

Champions

Men's singles
- (Australia) Ken Rosewall

Women's singles
- (Australia) Margaret Court

Men's doubles
- (Australia) Ken Rosewall / (Australia) Fred Stolle

Women's doubles
- (Australia) Margaret Court / (Australia) Evonne Goolagong

Mixed doubles
- (Australia) Fred Stolle / (Australia) Margaret Court
- South African Open

The 1971 South African Open was a combined men's and women's tennis tournament played on outdoor hard courts at the Ellis Park Tennis Stadium in Johannesburg, South Africa. It was the 68th edition of the tournament and was held from 5 April through 17 April 1971. Ken Rosewall and Margaret Court won the singles titles.

== Finals ==
=== Men's singles ===
(Australia) Ken Rosewall defeated (Australia) Fred Stolle 6–4, 7–5, 3–6, 6–4

=== Women's singles ===
(Australia) Margaret Court defeated (Australia) Evonne Goolagong 6–3, 6–1

=== Men's doubles ===
(Australia) Ken Rosewall / (Australia) Fred Stolle defeated (South Africa) Bob Hewitt / (South Africa) Frew McMillan 5–7, 6–2, 6–1, 6–2

=== Women's doubles ===
(Australia) Margaret Court / (Australia) Evonne Goolagong defeated (South Africa) Brenda Kirk / (South Africa) Laura Rossouw 6–3, 6–2

=== Mixed's doubles ===
(Australia) Margaret Court / (Australia) Fred Stolle defeated (Australia) Ray Ruffels / (South Africa) Pat Walkden 6–3, 7–6
