= Tom Mozur =

American tennis player

- Full name: Thomas Mozur
- Country (sports): United States

Singles
- Career record: 8–16

Grand Slam singles results
- Wimbledon: Q3 (1969)
- US Open: 2R (1968)

Doubles
- Career record: 5–9

Grand Slam doubles results
- Wimbledon: 1R (1969)
- US Open: 1R (1968)

Grand Slam mixed doubles results
- Wimbledon: 1R (1969)

Thomas Mozur (c. 1948 – October 25, 2008) was an American professional tennis player.

Mozur hailed from Sweetwater, Tennessee, and studied engineering at the University of Tennessee.

A self-taught player, Mozur competed for the Tennessee Volunteers in varsity tennis, twice earning All-American honors. He won an SEC singles title in 1968 and captained the side to an SEC championship two years alter. Competing on the professional tour, Mozur made the second round of the 1968 US Open and competed at the 1969 Wimbledon Championships. He is perhaps best remembered for participating in the longest doubles match when he and Lenny Schloss were beaten by Dick Dell and Dick Leach 6–3, 47–49, 20–22 at a 1967 tournament in Newport, Rhode Island.

Mozur, who served as director of tennis of the Knoxville Racquet Club, was a 2001 inductee into the Tennessee Tennis Hall of Fame, then in 2006 was further honored with induction into the Knoxville Sports Hall of Fame.

His son, also named Thomas, is a former UNC-Greensboro Spartans tennis coach.
