= 1965 Maccabiah Games =

Maccabiah games

7th Maccabiah
- Host city: Tel Aviv, Israel
- Nations: 29
- Debuting countries: Iran; Jamaica; Peru; Venezuela
- Athletes: 1,500
- Opening: August 23, 1965
- Opened by: Prime Minister Levi Eshkol
- Torchbearer: Debra Turner
- Main venue: Ramat Gan Stadium

The 7th Maccabiah Games in 1965 saw 1,500 athletes from 29 different countries compete in 21 sports. It was the first Maccabiah Games for Iran, Jamaica, Peru, and Venezuela. The United States delegation won the most gold medals, followed by Israel, the United Kingdom, South Africa, Mexico and the Netherlands, Southern Rhodesia, Australia, Argentina and Italy, and Brazil, Canada, Denmark, and Sweden with one each.

== History ==
The Maccabiah Games are named in honor of the Jewish Maccabees, who in the 2nd century BC revolted against and defeated the superior armies of King Antiochus IV Epiphanes, who was trying to abolish Judaism.

The Maccabiah Games were first held in 1932. In 1961, they were declared a "Regional Sports Event" by, and under the auspices and supervision of, the International Olympic Committee.

The Games opened before a crowd of 40,000 people in Ramat Gan Stadium. The flame to light the Maccabiah torch was lit at an ancient cemetery in Modiin, where it is believed that the Maccabees are buried, and run to the stadium by a relay of runners.

== Notable performances ==
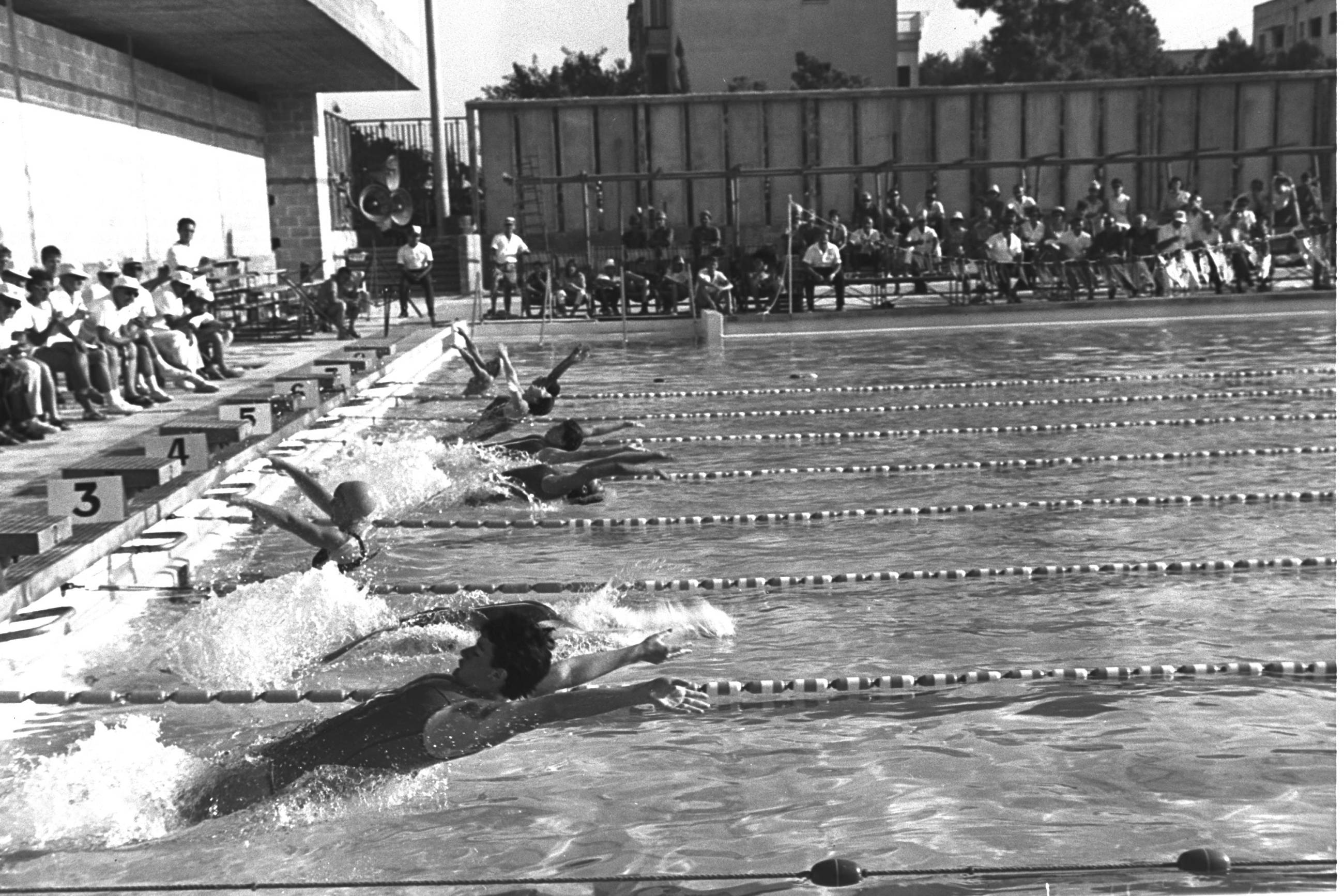
The 100 m backstroke competition at the Games.

In swimming, American 15-year-old 130-pound schoolboy Mark Spitz, swimming in his first international competition, won four gold medals—the 400 m freestyle, the 1,500 freestyle, the 400 m individual medley, and the 800 m freestyle relay. Also in swimming, Marilyn Ramenofsky of the US, who the year prior won a silver medal at the Olympics in the 400-meter freestyle, won the gold medal in the 400-meter freestyle. Israeli Yvonne Tobis, 17 years old, won the 400 m individual medley. Israeli Shlomit Nir, a future Olympian, won the 200 m breaststroke, beating out Mexican silver medalist and future Olympian Tamara Oynick. Israeli Olympian Gershon Shefa won a gold medal in the 200 m breaststroke. Australian 19-year-old Olympian John Stark won a gold medal in the 200 m butterfly.

In track and field, American Olympic champion and world record holder Gerry Ashworth ran in the Games, winning a gold medal in 10.6 seconds in the 100 m dash, and a gold medal in the 400 m relay. World record holder Henry Laskau of the United States won the gold medal in 3,000 m race walking. Lorraine Lotzof (South Africa) won the 100m, 200m and 400m athletic events. She was awarded Trophy for Outstanding Athlete across all sports at the 1965 Games. Olympian Michal Lamdani competed for Israel in the high jump, winning a gold medal.

In tennis, Dutchman Tom Okker won both the men's singles and the mixed doubles gold medals. American Mike Franks won a gold medal in doubles in tennis, and a silver medal in men's singles, losing to Okker. Canadian Vicki Berner won a gold medal in women's singles, defeating South African Esmé Emmanuel who won the silver medal, defeating American Marilyn Aschner along the way. Emmanuel won a gold medal in women's tennis in doubles with partner Rene Wolpert, defeating Americans Nadine Netter and Carole Wright.

The U.S. won the gold medal in basketball, with Tal Brody, Ronald Green, Steve Nisenson, Dave Newmark, and Steve Chubin. The Israeli basketball team was led by Tani Cohen-Mintz.

In gymnastics, American 3-time Olympian Abie Grossfeld won four gold medals, four silver medals, and three bronze medals. World trampoline champion Dan Millman of the US won four gold medals. American Steve Cohen, a future Olympian, won four gold medals, four silver medals, and two bronze medals.

In fencing, Yves Dreyfus, a future two-time Olympic bronze medalist, won the silver medal for France in individual épée. American Olympian David Micahnik won the individual épée gold medal. American Olympian Martin Jay Davis won a gold medal, and American Olympian Al Axelrod also competed for the US in foil fencing. Canada's future Olympian Peter Bakonyi won a silver medal.

In judo, Jim Bregman of the US, who the year prior won a bronze medal at the Olympics in the middleweight (80 kg), won a gold medal, as did Bernard Lepkofker of the United States.

In wrestling, Israeli Moshe Weinberg, who years later was killed in the Munich Massacre, won a gold medal in Greco Roman wrestling. Argentine Olympian Daniel Verník won a silver medal in the middleweight wrestling competition.

Otto Decker, whose parents sent him from Germany to England as part of the kindertransport at the outset of the Holocaust, represented the U.S., which came in 9th, as a halfback in soccer. Americans Harlan Cohen, and Gene Selznick, who had played on world championship teams and was squad captain, competed the Team USA volleyball squad.

The U.S. won the gold medal in shooting (free pistol event). The U.S. won the gold medal in water polo, which was its first international gold medal since the 1904 Olympics held in St. Louis.

== Participating communities ==
The number in parentheses indicates the number of participants that community contributed. Poland, appearing for the first time, engaged in a series of exhibitions.

- Argentina
- Australia
- Austria
- Belgium
- Brazil
- Canada (30)
- Chile
- Denmark
- Finland
- France
- India
- Iran
- Ireland
- Israel (largest)
- Italy
- Jamaica
- Mexico
- Netherlands
- Peru
- Rhodesia
- South Africa
- Sweden
- Switzerland
- Turkey
- United Kingdom
- United States (202; 2nd-largest)
- Venezuela

== Medal count ==
The United States delegation won the most gold medals, followed by Israel, the United Kingdom, South Africa, Mexico and the Netherlands, Southern Rhodesia, Australia, Argentina and Italy, and Brazil, Canada, Denmark, and Sweden with one each.

Rank	Nation	Gold	Silver	Bronze	Total
1	United States (USA)	68	45	33	146
2	Israel (ISR)	32	45	30	107
3	United Kingdom (UKB)	18	10	18	46
4	South Africa (SAF)	13	11	6	30
Totals (4 entries)		131	111	87	329

== Link ==
- Summaries of each of the Games
