= 1968 US Open – Men's doubles =

Men's doubles
- 1968 US Open

Final
- Champions: (United States) Bob Lutz (United States) Stan Smith
- Runners-up: (United States) Arthur Ashe (Spain) Andrés Gimeno
- Score: 11–9, 6–1, 7–5

Details
- Draw: 46
- Seeds: 8

Events
Singles	men	women		boys	girls
Doubles	men	women	mixed	boys	girls
WC Singles	men	women	quad
WC Doubles	men	women	quad
Legends	men	women	mixed
- US Open

John Newcombe and Tony Roche were the defending champions, but lost in the quarterfinals to Clark Graebner and Charlie Pasarell.

Bob Lutz and Stan Smith won the title, defeating Arthur Ashe and Andrés Gimeno in the final, 11–9, 6–1, 7–5.

== Seeds ==
1. (Australia) John Newcombe / (Australia) Tony Roche (quarterfinals)
2. (Australia) Ken Rosewall / (Australia) Fred Stolle (third round)
3. (Australia) Roy Emerson / (Australia) Rod Laver (second round)
4. (Australia) Mal Anderson / (United States) Dennis Ralston (quarterfinals)

5. (Netherlands) Tom Okker / (United States) Marty Riessen (quarterfinals)
6. (United States) Bob Lutz / (United States) Stan Smith (champions)
7. (United States) Arthur Ashe / (Spain) Andrés Gimeno (final)
8. (United States) Clark Graebner / (United States) Charlie Pasarell (semifinals)

Click on the seed number of a player to go to their draw section.

== Draw ==
Key

- Q = Qualifier
- WC = Wild card
- LL = Lucky loser
- Alt = Alternate
- ITF = ITF entry
- PR = Protected ranking
- SR = Special ranking
- SE = Special exempt
- JE = Junior exempt
- JR = Junior Accelerator Programme entrant
- CO = College Accelerator Programme entrant
- NG = Next Gen Accelerator Program entrant
- w/o = Walkover
- r = Retired
- d = Defaulted

=== Finals ===
Quarterfinals
1	(Australia) John Newcombe (Australia) Tony Roche	4	4
8	(United States) Clark Graebner (United States) Charlie Pasarell	6	6
4	(Australia) Mal Anderson (United States) Dennis Ralston
7	(United States) Arthur Ashe (Spain) Andrés Gimeno	w/o
5	(Netherlands) Tom Okker (United States) Marty Riessen	6	2
(United States) Jim McManus (United States) Jim Osborne	8	6
6	(United States) Bob Lutz (United States) Stan Smith	11	3	9
(South Africa) Cliff Drysdale (United Kingdom) Roger Taylor	9	6	7

Semifinals
8	(United States) Clark Graebner (United States) Charlie Pasarell	4	6	6	18	12
7	(United States) Arthur Ashe (Spain) Andrés Gimeno	6	3	4	20	14
(United States) Jim McManus (United States) Jim Osborne	4	3	2
6	(United States) Robert Lutz (United States) Stan Smith	6	6	6

Final
7	(United States) Arthur Ashe (Spain) Andrés Gimeno	9	1	5
6	(United States) Robert Lutz (United States) Stan Smith	11	6	7

=== Top half ===
==== Section 1 ====
First round

Second round
1	(Australia) J Newcombe (Australia) T Roche	6	6
(United States) P Gerken (United States) N Weld	1	4
(United States) C Steele (United States) P Sullivan	4	4
(United States) R Holmberg (United States) A Olmedo	6	6
8	(United States) C Graebner (United States) C Pasarell	4	6	8
(Pakistan) H Rahim (Jamaica) R Russell	6	4	6
(South Africa) B Hewitt (South Africa) R Moore	6	6
(United States) M Franks (United States) B Talbert	2	2

Third round
1	(Australia) J Newcombe (Australia) T Roche	6	6
(United States) R Holmberg (United States) A Olmedo	1	4
8	(United States) C Graebner (United States) C Pasarell	8	3	6
(South Africa) B Hewitt (South Africa) R Moore	6	6	3

Quarterfinals
1	(Australia) J Newcombe (Australia) T Roche	4	4
8	(United States) C Graebner (United States) C Pasarell	6	6

==== Section 2 ====
First round
(United States) T Mozur (United States) L Schloss	4	3	3
(Chile) L Ayala (Socialist Federal Republic of Yugoslavia) Ž Fraunlović	6	6	6
(United States) B Brown (Australia) J Brown	w/o
(United States) D Eddy (United States) J Scheaffer
(Brazil) T Koch (Denmark) T Ulrich	w/o
(West Germany) I Buding (Ecuador) E Zuleta
7	(United States) A Ashe (Spain) A Gimeno	6	6
(United States) D Dell (United States) G Scott	2	2
(United States) S Stewart (United States) B Seewagen	15	3	8
(Canada) J Sharpe (Canada) F Tutvin	13	6	6
(Chile) P Cornejo (Chile) J Fillol	4	4
(France) P Barthès (Socialist Federal Republic of Yugoslavia) N Pilić	6	6
(United States) D Stockton (United States) E van Dillen	7	5
(United States) B MacKay (Ecuador) P Segura	9	7

Second round
4	(Australia) M Anderson (United States) D Ralston	6	6
(Chile) L Ayala (Socialist Federal Republic of Yugoslavia) Ž Franulović	2	4
(United States) B Brown (Australia) J Brown	3	11	6
(Brazil) T Koch (Denmark) T Ulrich	6	9	4
7	(United States) A Ashe (Spain) A Gimeno	4	9	6
(United States) S Stewart (United States) B Seewagen	6	7	2
(France) P Barthès (Socialist Federal Republic of Yugoslavia) N Pilić	6	6
(United States) B MacKay (Ecuador) P Segura	4	3

Third round
4	(Australia) M Anderson (United States) D Ralston	6	8
(United States) B Brown (Australia) J Brown	4	6
7	(United States) A Ashe (Spain) A Gimeno	4	8	6
(France) P Barthès (Socialist Federal Republic of Yugoslavia) N Pilić	6	6	4

Quarterfinals
4	(Australia) M Anderson (United States) D Ralston
7	(United States) A Ashe (Spain) A Gimeno	w/o

=== Bottom half ===
==== Section 3 ====
First round
(Mexico) M Lara (Mexico) J Loyo Mayo	10	6	6
(United States) A Neely (United States) W Tym	12	2	4
(Australia) A Stone (Australia) C Stubs	6	6
(United States) J Nash (South Africa) E Sturgess	1	2
(South Africa) J de Zeeuw (Brazil) R Marcher
(United States) V Seixas (United States) T Trabert	w/o
(United States) C McKinley (Mexico) A Palafox	4	5	4
5	(Netherlands) T Okker (United States) M Riessen	6	7	6
(United Kingdom) C Bovett (United States) G Taylor	w/o
(India) R Krishnan (India) P Lall
(United States) T Gorman (United Kingdom) B Knight	6	4	7
(United States) D Dell (United States) T Leonard	1	6	5
(Australia) K Coombes (Australia) W Jacques	9	6	3
(United States) J McManus (United States) J Osborne	11	3	6

Second round
(Mexico) M Lara (Mexico) J Loyo Mayo	6	6
(Australia) A Stone (Australia) C Stubs	4	2
(United States) V Seixas (United States) T Trabert	6	1	6
5	(Netherlands) T Okker (United States) M Riessen	3	6	8
(United Kingdom) C Bovett (United States) G Taylor	9	6
(United States) T Gorman (United Kingdom) B Knight	7	2
(United States) J McManus (United States) J Osborne	10	6
3	(Australia) R Emerson (Australia) R Laver	8	3

Third round
(Mexico) M Lara (Mexico) J Loyo Mayo	5	6	5
5	(Netherlands) T Okker (United States) M Riessen	7	2	7
(United Kingdom) C Bovett (United States) G Taylor	7	3
(United States) J McManus (United States) J Osborne	9	6

Quarterfinals
5	(Netherlands) T Okker (United States) M Riessen	6	2
(United States) J McManus (United States) J Osborne	8	6

==== Section 4 ====
First round

Second round
(United States) J Borowiak (United States) P Fishbach	8	8
(New Zealand) I Crookenden (New Zealand) L Gerrard	10	10
(United States) S Giammalva (United States) D Savitt	7	2
6	(United States) B Lutz (United States) S Smith	9	6
(United Kingdom) P Curtis (United Kingdom) P Hutchins	2	3
(South Africa) C Drysdale (United Kingdom) R Taylor	6	6
(Australia) P Cawthorn (Argentina) G Garetto
2	(Australia) K Rosewall (Australia) F Stolle	w/o

Third round
(New Zealand) I Crookenden (New Zealand) L Gerrard	1	3
6	(United States) B Lutz (United States) S Smith	6	6
(South Africa) C Drysdale (United Kingdom) R Taylor	6	1	8
2	(Australia) K Rosewall (Australia) F Stolle	4	6	6

Quarterfinals
6	(United States) B Lutz (United States) S Smith	11	3	9
(South Africa) C Drysdale (United Kingdom) R Taylor	9	6	7
