= Pixie Lamm =

American professional tennis player (1948–2017)

- Full name: Pixie Lamm Coolidge
- Country (sports): United States
- Born: March 4, 1948; Hartford, Connecticut
- Died: November 28, 2017 (aged 69)

Singles

Grand Slam singles results
- Wimbledon: 2R (1968)
- US Open: 2R (1968)

Doubles

Grand Slam doubles results
- US Open: 1R (1968)

Grand Slam mixed doubles results
- Wimbledon: 1R (1968)

Pixie Lamm Coolidge (March 4, 1948 – November 28, 2017) was an American professional tennis player.

Lamm was born in Hartford, Connecticut and moved to California during her childhood. She partnered up with Rosie Casals in 1963 to win the national 16s and under doubles championships, before going on to claim the California state junior title in the 18s age division. In 1968 she made the singles second rounds at both the Wimbledon Championships and the US Open. She was a collegiate tennis player and team captain for the UCLA Bruins. In 1970 she earned a place on the United States team to compete at the Summer Universiade in Italy.
