= Lindsay Blachford =

British tennis player

- Full name: Lindsay Blachford
- Country (sports): (United Kingdom) Great Britain
- Born: 6 April 1953 (age 71); Stepney, London, England

Singles

Grand Slam singles results
- Australian Open: 2R (1973)
- French Open: 1R (1974)
- Wimbledon: 3R (1973)

Doubles

Grand Slam doubles results
- Australian Open: 1R (1973)
- Wimbledon: 2R (1972)
- US Open: 1R (1974)

Lindsay Blachford (born 6 April 1953) is a British former professional tennis player.

Blachford, who comes from London, competed on tour in the 1970s.

She had a win over American Federation Cup player Patti Hogan at the 1972 North of England Championships.

Most notably, Blachford made the round of 32 at the 1973 Wimbledon Championships, beating two other British players en route, former French Open champion Shirley Brasher and a young Sue Barker.
