= Esmé Emmanuel =

South African tennis player

- Full name: Esmé Emmanuel Berg
- Country (sports): South Africa
- Born: 14 June 1947 (age 79)

Grand Slam singles results
- French Open: 3R (1970)
- Wimbledon: 3R (1967, 1970)
- US Open: 3R (1966)

Grand Slam doubles results
- French Open: SF (1967)
- Wimbledon: QF (1972)
- US Open: QF (1966)

Grand Slam mixed doubles results
- French Open: 2R (1966, 1971)
- Wimbledon: 4R (1972)
- US Open: 3R (1970)
Medal record
Maccabiah Games
Silver medal – second place	1965 Israel	Women's Singles
Gold medal – first place	1965 Israel	Women's Doubles
Silver medal – second place	1969 Israel	Women's Doubles
Silver medal – second place	1969 Israel	Mixed Doubles

Esmé Emmanuel Berg (born 14 June 1947) is a former professional tennis player from South Africa. Emmanuel was the girls' singles champion at the 1965 French Championships. She won a doubles gold medal at the 1965 Maccabiah Games in Israel. Her best performance at Wimbledon came in 1972 when she was a doubles quarterfinalist, partnering Ceci Martinez.

== Biography ==
Born in 1947, Emmanuel is a Sephardi Jew, with a mother who was Turkish-born but raised in France. Her father was an emigrant to New York from Salonika, Greece. She studied economics at San Francisco State University.

Emmanuel was the girls' singles champion at the 1965 French Championships.

She won a doubles gold medal at the 1965 Maccabiah Games in Ramat Gan, Israel, in women's tennis in doubles with partner Rene Wolpert, defeating Americans Nadine Netter and Carole Wright. She won a silver medal in women's singles, defeating American Marilyn Aschner along the way but losing to Canadian Vicki Berner in the finals.

In 1966, she played a Federation Cup tie for South Africa against the Netherlands.

She competed in women's singles at the 1969 Maccabiah Games, defeating American Marilyn Aschner in the quarterfinals before losing in the semifinals to American Pam Richmond. She also competed in women's doubles, with partner South African P. Kriger, winning a silver medal, as they lost in the finals to Americans Julie Heldman and Marilyn Aschner. In the mixed doubles, she and South African Jack Saul came away with silver medals, after being defeated in the finals by Heldman and American Ed Rubinoff.

Emmanuel married husband Roger E. Berg in 1969.

Her best performance at Wimbledon came in 1972 when she was a doubles quarterfinalist, partnering Ceci Martinez. She and Martinez also were students together at San Francisco State College.

== See also ==
- List of South Africa Fed Cup team representatives
