= Nadine Netter =

American tennis player

- Full name: Nadine Netter Levy
- Country (sports): United States
- Born: October 26, 1944 (age 80)

Singles

Grand Slam singles results
- French Open: 2R (1967)
- Wimbledon: 2R (1968)
- US Open: 3R (1962)

Doubles

Grand Slam doubles results
- French Open: 2R (1967)
- US Open: QF (1968)
Medal record
Maccabiah Games
Silver medal – second place	1965 Israel	Women's Doubles

Nadine Netter Levy (born October 26, 1944) is an American former professional tennis player. She competed in the French Open, Wimbledon, and at the US Open, and won a silver medal in women's doubles at the 1965 Maccabiah Games in Israel.

== Biography ==
Netter was born to parents who were recent arrivals. Her German father Kurt and Swiss mother Alice (Dreyfus) both left Europe in the early stages of World War II. She grew up in New York and is Jewish.

She attended Scarsdale High School and Wellesley College ('66), graduated with a degree in German, and was inducted into the Wellesley College Athletics Hall of Fame. She earned a Master’s of International Affairs degree from Columbia University. She won the Eastern Women's College Tournament in 1962, and was the Eastern Intercollegiate Champion and New England Intercollegiate women's Tennis Championship winner in 1965.

Active on tour in the 1960s, Netter competed internationally in the French Open and Wimbledon. She reached the third round of the U.S. National Championships in 1962 and was a doubles quarter-finalist at the US Open in 1968.

At the 1965 Maccabiah Games in Israel, she and partner Carole Wright won a silver medal in women's doubles, losing in the finals to South Africans Esmé Emmanuel and Rene Wolpert.
