= Ned Weld =

American professional tennis player (1937–2006)

- Full name: Edward W. Weld
- Country (sports): United States
- Born: February 20, 1937
- Died: November 19, 2006 (aged 69)
- Plays: Right-handed

Singles

Grand Slam singles results
- US Open: 2R (1958, 1968)

Edward W. Weld (February 20, 1937 — November 19, 2006) was an American professional tennis player.

Weld, a Massachusetts native, captained Harvard University in varsity tennis. He twice featured in the singles second round of the US Open. A stockbroker by profession, he was consistently the number one ranked player in New England and served multiple terms as president of the New England Lawn Tennis Association.
