= 1968 US Open – Men's singles =

Men's singles
- 1968 US Open

Final
- Champion: (United States) Arthur Ashe
- Runner-up: (Netherlands) Tom Okker
- Score: 14–12, 5–7, 6–3, 3–6, 6–3

Details
- Draw: 96
- Seeds: 16

Events
Singles	men	women		boys	girls
Doubles	men	women	mixed	boys	girls
WC Singles	men	women	quad
WC Doubles	men	women	quad
Legends	men	women	mixed
- US Open

Arthur Ashe defeated Tom Okker in the final, 14–12, 5–7, 6–3, 3–6, 6–3 to win the men's singles tennis title at the 1968 US Open. It was his first major singles title, becoming the first African American man to win a singles major. This was the first edition of the tournament to be open to professional players, marking a period in tennis history known as the Open Era.

John Newcombe was the defending champion, but lost in the quarterfinals to Clark Graebner.

== Seeds ==
The seeded players are listed below. Arthur Ashe is the champion; others show the round in which they were eliminated.

1. (Australia) Rod Laver (fourth round)
2. (Australia) Tony Roche (fourth round)
3. (Australia) Ken Rosewall (semifinals)
4. (Australia) John Newcombe (quarterfinals)
5. (United States) Arthur Ashe (champion)
6. (United States) Dennis Ralston (quarterfinals)
7. (United States) Clark Graebner (semifinals)
8. (Netherlands) Tom Okker (finals)
9. n/a
10. (Spain) Andrés Gimeno (first round)
11. (Australia) Fred Stolle (second round)
12. (United States) Charlie Pasarell (third round)
13. (United States) Richard Pancho Gonzales (quarterfinals)
14. (Australia) Roy Emerson (fourth round)
15. (United States) Marty Riessen (second round)
16. (South Africa) Cliff Drysdale (quarterfinals)

== Draw ==
=== Key ===
- Q = Qualifier
- WC = Wild card
- LL = Lucky loser
- r = Retired

=== Final eight ===
Quarterfinals
16	(South Africa) Cliff Drysdale	10	3	7	4
5	(United States) Arthur Ashe	8	6	9	6
4	(Australia) John Newcombe	7	9	1	4
7	(United States) Clark Graebner	5	11	6	6
6	(United States) Dennis Ralston	2	2	3
3	(Australia) Ken Rosewall	6	6	6
8	(Netherlands) Tom Okker	14	6	10	6
13	(United States) Pancho Gonzales	16	3	8	3

Semifinals
5	(United States) Arthur Ashe	4	8	7	6
7	(United States) Clark Graebner	6	6	5	2
3	(Australia) Ken Rosewall	6	4	8	1
8	(Netherlands) Tom Okker	8	6	6	6

Final
5	(United States) Arthur Ashe	14	5	6	3	6
8	(Netherlands) Tom Okker	12	7	3	6	3

=== Section 1 ===
First round

Second round
1	(Australia) R Laver	6	4	6	6	6
(Brazil) T Koch	8	6	4	4	4
(New Zealand) I Crookenden	3	4	1
(United States) P Segura	6	6	6
16	(South Africa) C Drysdale	6	8	6	6
(Chile) L Ayala	4	10	0	3
(New Zealand) L Gerrard	4	7	2
(Australia) A Stone	6	9	6

Third round
1	(Australia) R Laver	6	6	6
(United States) P Segura	2	1	1
16	(South Africa) C Drysdale	6	6	6
(Australia) A Stone	3	2	1

Round four
1	(Australia) R Laver	6	4	6	1	1
16	(South Africa) C Drysdale	4	6	3	6	6

=== Section 2 ===
First round

Second round
5	(United States) A Ashe	6	6	6
(United States) F Parker	3	2	2
(United Kingdom) P Hutchins	6	6	4	2	6
(Pakistan) H Rahim	3	4	6	6	2
14	(Australia) R Emerson	10	6	6
(United States) S Giammalva Sr.	8	0	3
(United States) N Weld	6	4	4	2
(United States) J Borowiak	3	6	6	6

Third round
5	(United States) A Ashe	6	6	6
(United Kingdom) P Hutchins	3	4	1
14	(Australia) R Emerson	6	6	6
(United States) J Borowiak	3	4	0

Round four
5	(United States) A Ashe	6	9	6
14	(Australia) R Emerson	4	7	2

=== Section 3 ===
First round
4	(Australia) J Newcombe	6	6	6
(United States) A Quay	1	3	3
(Australia) W Jacques	12	6	0	4
(India) R Krishnan	14	2	6	6
(United States) EV Seixas	8	6	6
(United States) T Gorman	6	4	3
(United States) W Tym	3	6	6	6	1
(United States) C McKinley	6	8	2	3	6
15	(United States) M Riessen	11	4	6	6
(Socialist Federal Republic of Yugoslavia) Z Franulović	9	6	3	4
(United States) C Montgomery	4	3	3
(Denmark) T Ulrich	6	6	6
(United States) R Goldman	12	7	2
(United States) R McKinley	14	9	6
(Chile) J Fillol Sr.	6	6	6
(United Kingdom) C Bovett	4	1	0

Second round
4	(Australia) J Newcombe	6	6	6
(India) R Krishnan	4	4	2
(United States) EV Seixas	4	3	3
(United States) C McKinley	6	6	6
15	(United States) M Riessen	6	2	3	2
(Denmark) T Ulrich	3	6	6	6
(United States) R McKinley	3	6	6	6
(Chile) J Fillol Sr.	6	3	4	2

Third round
4	(Australia) J Newcombe	6	6	6
(United States) C McKinley	3	2	2
(Denmark) T Ulrich	6	6	6
(United States) R McKinley	4	4	2

Round four
4	(Australia) J Newcombe	5	4	6	10	6
(Denmark) T Ulrich	7	6	4	8	4

=== Section 4 ===
First round
7	(United States) C Graebner	6	1	7	6
(India) P Lall	3	6	5	4
(United States) J McManus	6	6	8
(United States) S Stewart	3	4	6
(Ecuador) E Zuleta	1	1	3
(United States) T Mozur	6	6	6
(Canada) F Tutvin	3	1	1
(United Kingdom) R Taylor	6	6	6
LL	(United States) P Cranis	2	2	4
(United States) D O'Bryant	6	6	6
(United States) P Gerken	6	3	6	6
(United States) W Harris	2	6	3	0
(Chile) P Cornejo	6	6	12
(United States) T Leonard	4	4	10
(United States) G Taylor	9	10	4
(United States) E Scott	11	12	6

Second round
7	(United States) C Graebner	6	6	14
(United States) J McManus	1	4	12
(United States) T Mozur	5	3	4
(United Kingdom) R Taylor	7	6	6
(United States) D O'Bryant	18	2	6	6	0
(United States) P Gerken	16	6	4	8	6
(Chile) P Cornejo	3	3	2
(United States) E Scott	6	6	6

Third round
7	(United States) C Graebner	6	6	6
(United Kingdom) R Taylor	3	4	4
(United States) P Gerken	2	6	4
(United States) E Scott	6	8	6

Round four
7	(United States) C Graebner	7	6	6
(United States) E Scott	5	0	3

=== Section 5 ===
First round
(Socialist Federal Republic of Yugoslavia) N Pilić	6	6	3	6
(United States) B Seewagen	3	4	6	4
(Puerto Rico) T Carrero	4	3	6	6	7
(United States) D Dell	6	6	2	2	9
(United Kingdom) B Knight	1	4	7
(United States) T Edlefsen	6	6	9
(Australia) K Coombes	9	5	1
12	(United States) C Pasarell	11	7	6
(United States) F Robbins	6	14	19
(Mexico) J Loyo-Mayo	8	16	21
(United States) A Neely	6	3	3	7	3
(Canada) J Sharpe	3	6	6	5	6
(United States) S Pasarell	1	3	8	5
(Jamaica) R Russell	6	6	6	7
(United States) C Steele III	3	0	4
6	(United States) D Ralston	6	6	6

Second round
(Socialist Federal Republic of Yugoslavia) N Pilić	6	6	6
(United States) D Dell	1	4	2
(United States) T Edlefsen	1	7	2
12	(United States) C Pasarell	6	9	6
(Mexico) J Loyo-Mayo	5	3	6	6	6
(Canada) J Sharpe	7	6	4	3	1
(Jamaica) R Russell	1	4	1
6	(United States) D Ralston	6	6	6

Third round
(Socialist Federal Republic of Yugoslavia) N Pilić	6	9	4	6
12	(United States) C Pasarell	4	7	6	4
(Mexico) J Loyo-Mayo	11	2	6	5	1
6	(United States) D Ralston	9	6	3	7	6

Round four
(Socialist Federal Republic of Yugoslavia) N Pilić	6	2	7	11	3
6	(United States) D Ralston	2	6	5	13	6

=== Section 6 ===
First round
(United States) B MacKay	6	6	5	3
(United States) J Osborne	8	4	7	6
(United States) R Holmberg	6	6	6
(Venezuela) H Hose	2	3	4
(United States) R Lutz	6	6	6
(Canada) P Burwash	1	1	3
(South Africa) R Moore	4	6	6	6
10	(Spain) A Gimeno	6	1	2	1
(Mexico) M Lara	9	6	4	8
(United States) P Sullivan	7	1	6	6
(United States) R Perry	6	0	5	5
(United States) D Stockton	4	6	7	7
(Mexico) A Palafox	6	4	6	6
(United States) E van Dillen	4	6	2	4
(United States) J Parker	3	3	4
3	(Australia) K Rosewall	6	6	6

Second round
(United States) J Osborne	9	5	9
(United States) R Holmberg	11	7	11
(United States) R Lutz	6	8	2	6	7
(South Africa) R Moore	8	6	6	4	5
(Mexico) M Lara	2	7	7	6
(United States) D Stockton	6	5	5	2
(Mexico) A Palafox	0	1	0
3	(Australia) K Rosewall	6	6	6

Third round
(United States) R Holmberg	6	11	7
(United States) R Lutz	4	9	5
(Mexico) M Lara	1	3	1
3	(Australia) K Rosewall	6	6	6

Round four
(United States) R Holmberg	3	3	6	6
3	(Australia) K Rosewall	6	6	2	8

=== Section 7 ===
First round

Second round
(Australia) J Brown	6	2	7	6	11
(West Germany) I Buding	3	6	5	8	9
(United Kingdom) P Curtis	6	6	4	6	8
11	(Australia) F Stolle	8	2	6	3	6
(France) P Barthès	14	6	9
(United States) P Fishbach	12	2	7
(United States) L Schloss	1	0	4
8	(Netherlands) T Okker	6	6	6

Third round
(Australia) J Brown	4	6	6	6	1
(United Kingdom) P Curtis	6	3	4	8	6
(France) P Barthès	2	11	5
8	(Netherlands) T Okker	6	13	7

Round four
(United Kingdom) P Curtis	6	6	3	2
8	(Netherlands) T Okker	8	2	6	6

=== Section 8 ===
First round

Second round
(Ecuador) P Guzmán	1	1	2
(Australia) M Anderson	6	6	6
(Australia) C Stubs	2	2	2
13	(United States) RP Gonzales	6	6	6
(United States) D Bleckinger	w/o
(United States) A Olmedo
(United States) S Smith	6	8	6	4	4
2	(Australia) T Roche	3	10	3	6	6

Third round
(Australia) M Anderson	4	4	4
13	(United States) RP Gonzales	6	6	6
(United States) A Olmedo	2	6	4
2	(Australia) T Roche	6	8	6

Round four
13	(United States) RP Gonzales	8	6	6
2	(Australia) T Roche	6	4	2

== Effects of Ashe's Victory ==
Arthur Ashe's victory took the public by storm. Telegrams from fans, politicians, and celebrities began to flood in. One celebrity who celebrated the importance of Ashe's victory was Jackie Robinson. He stated that this victory would "bridge the gap between races and inspire black people the world over and also affect the decency of all Americans".

Preceded by 1968 Wimbledon Championships – Men's singles	Grand Slam men's singles	Succeeded by 1969 Australian Open – Men's singles
