= Tina Lyman =

American professional tennis player (born 1949)

- Full name: Tina Lyman Kellogg
- Country (sports): United States
- Born: June 15, 1949 (age 77)
- Plays: Left-handed

Grand Slam singles results
- US Open: 3R (1967)

Grand Slam doubles results
- US Open: 2R (1967)

Tina Lyman Kellogg (born June 15, 1949) is an American former professional tennis player.

A left-hander from Los Altos, California, Lyman began playing at age 12 and became nationally ranked in junior tennis. She reached the third round of singles at the 1967 U.S. National Championships, losing to unseeded player Maryna Godwin.

In 1972 she was married to UC Berkeley graduate Don Kellogg.
