= Marilyn Aschner =

American tennis player

- Full name: Marilyn Jane Aschner
- Country (sports): United States
- Born: March 8, 1948 (age 78)
- Plays: Left-handed

Grand Slam singles results
- French Open: Q1 (1969)
- Wimbledon: 2R (1968)
- US Open: 2R (1964, 1967, 1969)

Grand Slam doubles results
- Wimbledon: 3R (1968)
- US Open: 3R (1966)
Medal record
Maccabiah Games
Gold medal – first place	1969 Israel	Women's Doubles

Marilyn Jane Aschner (born March 8, 1948) is an American former professional tennis player. She was an Orange Bowl doubles champion in 1966, and she won a gold medal at the 1969 Maccabiah Games in Israel in doubles with partner Julie Heldman. She made the third round in women's doubles of the 1966 U.S. National Championships and 1968 Wimbledon Championships.

== Biography ==
A left-handed player from New York, Aschner lived in Holliswood, Queens and Jamaica, Queens. Aschner, who is Jewish, was active on tour in the 1960s and 1970s. She played high school tennis for Jamaica High School in Jamaica, Queens, New York. She played collegiate tennis for Queens College while studying for a sociology degree.

She was an Orange Bowl doubles champion in 1966. She made the women's doubles third round of both the 1966 U.S. National Championships and 1968 Wimbledon Championships.

At the 1965 Maccabiah Games in Israel, she was defeated in women's singles by South African Esmé Emmanuel, who won the silver medal.

She won a gold medal at the 1969 Maccabiah Games in doubles with partner Julie Heldman. Aschner also competed in women's singles, where she was defeated in the quarterfinals by Esmé Emmanuel.

Aschner taught tennis for many years at the Port Washington Tennis Academy in Port Washington, New York.
