= Victoria Rogers =

American tennis player

- Full name: Victoria Rogers McEvoy
- Country (sports): United States

Singles

Grand Slam singles results
- Wimbledon: 3R (1968)
- US Open: 3R (1968)

Doubles

Grand Slam doubles results
- Wimbledon: 3R (1968)
- US Open: QF (1968)

Victoria "Vicky" Rogers McEvoy is a former American tennis player. She reached the third round of Wimbledon and the U.S. Open in 1968 and was ranked third in the United States that year.

Following her tennis career, Rogers attended Harvard Medical School and as of 2015 was an Assistant Professor of Pediatrics there.
