= Ceci Martinez =

American tennis player

- Full name: Cecilia Martinez
- Country (sports): United States
- Born: May 24, 1947 (age 78) San Francisco, U.S.
- Plays: Right-handed

Singles
- Career record: -

Grand Slam singles results
- Australian Open: 3R (1975)
- French Open: 1R (1970, 1971, 1976)
- Wimbledon: QF (1970)
- US Open: 2R (1968, 1969, 1970, 1972, 1973, 1974)

Doubles
- Career record: -

Grand Slam doubles results
- Australian Open: 1R (1975)
- French Open: 3R (1970, 1971)
- Wimbledon: QF (1972)
- US Open: QF (1968)

Cecilia Martinez (born May 24, 1947) is an American former professional tennis player.

== Biography ==
Martinez, born and raised in San Francisco by a single mother, is one of five siblings and learned her tennis playing on public courts. She attended San Francisco State College and won the singles event at the USTA Intercollegiate National Championships in 1966.

During her career on the international circuit she was a Philippine Open singles champion in 1970, and reached the quarter-finals of the 1970 Wimbledon Championships, upsetting third seed Virginia Wade en route. She was active in the movement for women's tennis to become professional, which led to the establishment of the Women's Tennis Association.

Martinez had a best national ranking of 11 for singles and four in doubles.

Since retiring she has been inducted into the Hall of Fames of the Intercollegiate Tennis Association, USTA Northern California and the San Francisco State Gators.

== WTA Tour finals ==
=== Doubles: 1 (0–1) ===
Result	No.	Date	Tournament	Surface	Partner	Opponents	Score
Loss	0–1	Apr 1974	Sarasota, United States	Clay	(United States) Tory Fretz	(United States) Chris Evert (Australia) Evonne Goolagong	2–6, 2–6
