= Maryna Godwin =

South African tennis player

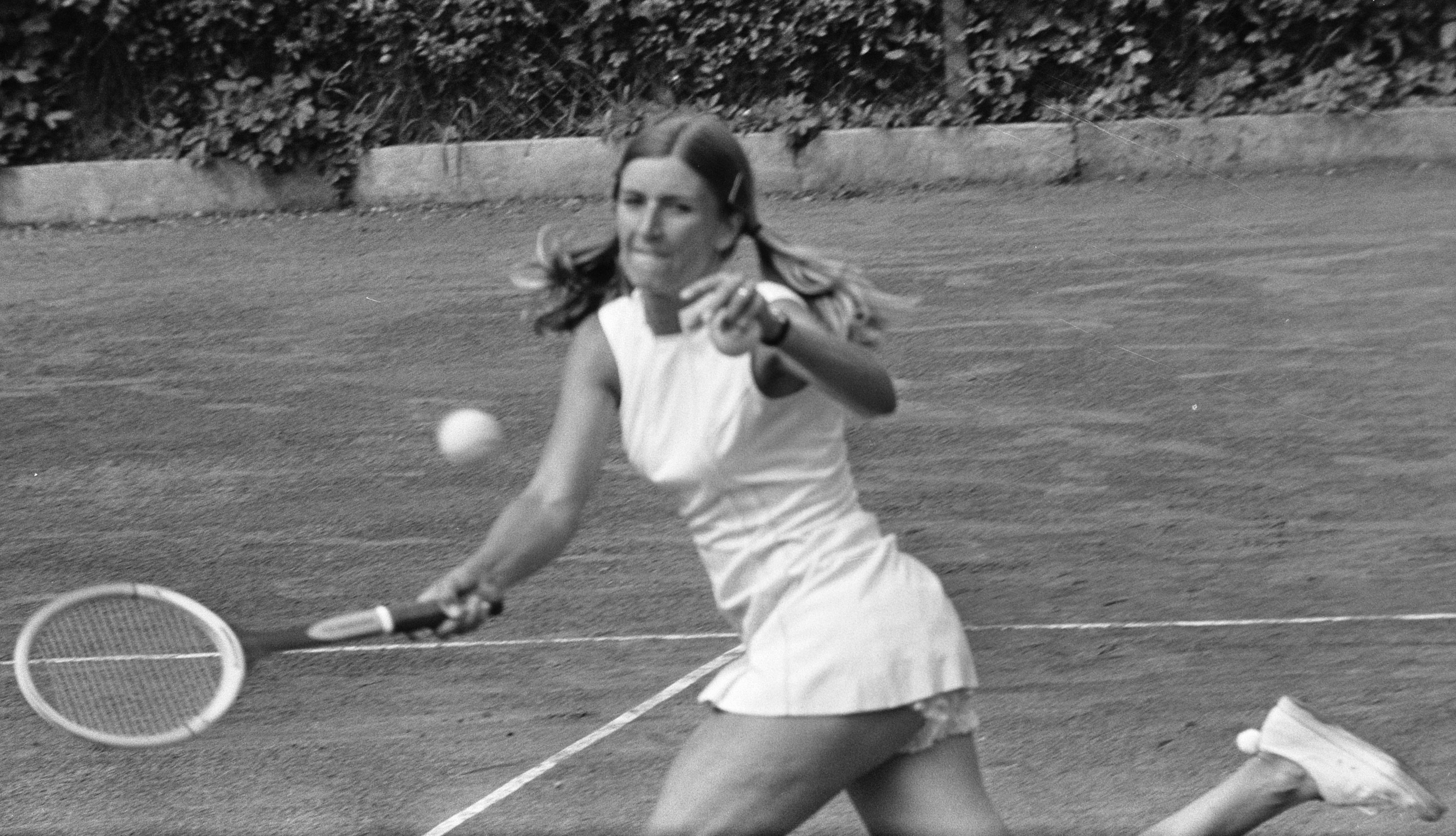
- Maryna Godwin in 1969
- Country (sports): South Africa
- Born: 9 September 1944 (age 81) Umtata, Cape Province, Union of South Africa
- Retired: 1969

Singles
- Career record: 8–8
- Career titles: 0 WTA, 0 ITF

Grand Slam singles results
- French Open: 3R (1968)
- Wimbledon: 3R (1967, 1969)
- US Open: QF (1968)

Doubles
- Career record: 5–5
- Career titles: 0 WTA, 0 ITF

Grand Slam doubles results
- French Open: 3R (1966, 1967, 1968)
- Wimbledon: 3R (1967)
- US Open: 1R (1968)

Grand Slam mixed doubles results
- Wimbledon: 4R (1967, 1968)

Maryna Godwin (later Maryna Procter, born 9 September 1944) is a retired South African tennis player. Her best achievement was reaching the quarterfinals of the 1968 US Open.

In 1968 and 1969 she played in four ties for the South African Fed Cup team.

In 1969, she met South African cricketer Mike Procter. They married three months later, after which Godwin changed her last name and retired from competitions. For many years, due to Procter's cricket contracts, their family was living half a year in England and half a year in Rhodesia, but in the 1980s they settled in Durban North, South Africa.

== Career finals ==
=== Doubles (1 runner-up) ===
Result	W-L	Date	Tournament	Surface	Partner	Opponent	Score
Loss	0–1	Dec 1967	Borders Championships, South Africa	?	(South Africa) Laura Rossouw	(United Kingdom) Winnie Shaw (United Kingdom) Nell Truman	4–6, 3–6
