= Sharon Walsh =

American tennis player (born 1952)

- Country (sports): United States
- Born: February 24, 1952 (age 74) San Francisco, California, U.S.
- Height: 1.74 m (5 ft 9 in)
- Plays: Right-handed
- Prize money: US$ 751,138

Singles
- Career record: 127–192
- Career titles: 0
- Highest ranking: No. 22 (February 1982)

Grand Slam singles results
- Australian Open: F (1979)
- French Open: 2R (1973, 1979, 1982)
- Wimbledon: 3R (1981, 1981, 1987)
- US Open: 4R (1981)

Doubles
- Career record: 430–234
- Career titles: 23

Grand Slam doubles results
- Australian Open: SF (1980, 1982–85)
- French Open: SF (1982)
- Wimbledon: SF (1982, 1984)
- US Open: F (1982)

Sharon Walsh-Arnold (née Walsh; born February 24, 1952) is a former professional tennis player from the United States.

Walsh enjoyed a long career, playing her first Grand Slam singles event in 1969 and her last Grand Slam doubles match in 1990. She was a finalist at the 1979 Australian Open where she lost to Barbara Jordan. She reached the fourth round of the 1981 US Open and the final of the doubles there the following year with Barbara Potter. She did not claim a WTA Tour singles title, but she had some success against top players, beating Hana Mandlíková in both their encounters (Christchurch 1978 and Australian Open 1983). She achieved her highest singles ranking of 22 in 1982, but was regarded as a doubles player, winning 30 titles in all.

Walsh married Michael H. Pete on April 20, 1985 in Sausalito, California. She competed as Sharon Walsh-Pete as from May 1985. Currently^{(2011)} she is married to Steve Arnold and lives in Colorado Springs where she has been a tennis teacher since 2001.

== WTA Tour finals ==
=== Singles: 1 (0–1) ===
Legend
Grand Slam tournaments
WTA Championships
Tier I
Tier II
Tier III
Tier IV & V

| Result | W/L | Date | Tournament | Surface | Opponent | Score |
|---|---|---|---|---|---|---|
| Loss | 0–1 | Jan 1980 | Australian Open, Melbourne | Grass | (United States) Barbara Jordan | 3–6, 3–6 |

=== Doubles: 44 (23–21) ===
Legend
Grand Slam tournaments
WTA Championships
Tier I
Tier II
Tier III
Tier IV & V

Titles by surface
| Hard | 5 |
| Clay | 4 |
| Grass | 4 |
| Carpet | 10 |

| Result | W/L | Date | Tournament | Surface | Partner | Opponents | Score |
|---|---|---|---|---|---|---|---|
| Win | 1. | Nov 1978 | Christchurch, New Zealand | Grass | (Australia) Lesley Hunt | (West Germany) Katja Ebbinghaus (West Germany) Sylvia Hanika | 6–1, 7–5 |
| Loss | 2. | Jan 1979 | Washington DC, U.S. | Carpet (i) | (United States) Renée Richards | (Socialist Federal Republic of Yugoslavia) Mima Jaušovec (Romania) Virginia Ruzici | 6–4, 2–6, 4–6 |
| Win | 3. | Sept 1980 | Atlanta, U.S. | Clay | (United States) Barbara Potter | (United States) Kathy Jordan (United States) Anne Smith | 6–3, 6–1 |
| Win | 4. | Nov 1980 | Hong Kong | Clay | (Australia) Wendy Turnbull | (United States) Penny Johnson (Chile) Silvana Urroz | 6–1, 6–2 |
| Loss | 5. | Dec 1980 | Adelaide, Australia | Grass | (United Kingdom) Sue Barker | (United States) Pam Shriver (Netherlands) Betty Stöve | 4–6, 3–6 |
| Win | 6. | Jan 1981 | Kansas City, U.S. | Carpet (i) | (United States) Barbara Potter | (United States) Rosie Casals (Australia) Wendy Turnbull | 6–2, 7–6 |
| Loss | 7. | Feb 1981 | Chicago, U.S. | Carpet (i) | (United States) Barbara Potter | (United States) Martina Navratilova (United States) Pam Shriver | 3–6, 1–6 |
| Win | 8. | Mar 1981 | Boston, U.S. | Carpet (i) | (United States) Barbara Potter | (United States) JoAnne Russell (Romania) Virginia Ruzici | 6–7, 6–4, 6–3 |
| Loss | 9. | May 1981 | Tokyo, Japan | Carpet | (United States) Barbara Potter | (United Kingdom) Sue Barker (United States) Ann Kiyomura | 5–7, 2–6 |
| Win | 10. | Nov 1981 | Hong Kong | Clay | (United States) Ann Kiyomura | (United Kingdom) Anne Hobbs (Australia) Susan Leo | 6–3, 6–4 |
| Win | 11. | Nov 1981 | Perth, Australia | Grass | (United States) Barbara Potter | (United States) Betsy Nagelsen (United States) Candy Reynolds | 6–4, 6–2 |
| Win | 12. | Feb 1982 | Kansas City, U.S. | Carpet (i) | (United States) Barbara Potter | (United States) Mary-Lou Daniels (United States) Anne Smith | 4–6, 6–2, 6–2 |
| Loss | 13. | Feb 1982 | Houston, U.S. | Carpet (i) | (United Kingdom) Sue Barker | (United States) Kathy Jordan (United States) Pam Shriver | 6–7, 2–6 |
| Win | 14. | Feb 1982 | Oakland, U.S. | Carpet (i) | (United States) Barbara Potter | (United States) Kathy Jordan (United States) Pam Shriver | 6–1, 3–6, 7–6 |
| Loss | 15. | Mar 1982 | Los Angeles, US | Carpet | (United States) Barbara Potter | (United States) Kathy Jordan (United States) Anne Smith | 3–6, 5–7 |
| Loss | 16. | Apr 1982 | Amelia Island, U.S. | Carpet | (United States) Barbara Potter | (United States) Leslie Allen (Socialist Federal Republic of Yugoslavia) Mima Jaušovec | 1–6, 5–7 |
| Loss | 17. | Aug 1982 | Canadian Open | Hard | (United States) Barbara Potter | (United States) Martina Navratilova (United States) Candy Reynolds | 4–6, 4–6 |
| Win | 18. | Aug 1982 | Mahwah, U.S. | Hard | (United States) Barbara Potter | (United States) Rosie Casals (Australia) Wendy Turnbull | 6–1, 6–4 |
| Loss | 18. | Sep 1982 | US Open, New York | Hard | (United States) Barbara Potter | (United States) Rosie Casals (Australia) Wendy Turnbull | 6–1, 6–4 |
| Loss | 19. | Oct 1982 | U.S. Indoors | Carpet (i) | (United States) Barbara Potter | (United States) Rosie Casals (Australia) Wendy Turnbull | 6–1, 6–4 |
| Win | 20. | Oct 1982 | Deerfield Beach, U.S. | Hard | (United States) Barbara Potter | (United States) Rosie Casals (Australia) Wendy Turnbull | 7–6, 7–6 |
| Loss | 21. | Nov 1982 | Brighton, England | Carpet (i) | (United States) Barbara Potter | (United States) Martina Navratilova (United States) Pam Shriver | 6–2, 5–7, 4–6 |
| Win | 22. | Feb 1983 | Palm Beach, U.S. | Clay | (United States) Barbara Potter | (United States) Kathy Jordan (United States) Paula Smith | 6–4, 4–6, 6–2 |
| Win | 23. | Apr 1983 | Tokyo, Japan | Carpet | (United States) Billie Jean King | (United States) Kathy Jordan (United States) Anne Smith | 6–1, 6–1 |
| Win | 24. | May 1983 | Atlanta, U.S. | Hard | (United States) Alycia Moulton | (United States) Rosie Casals (Australia) Wendy Turnbull | 6–3, 7–6 |
| Win | 25. | Jun 1983 | Birmingham, England | Grass | (United States) Billie Jean King | (South Africa) Beverly Mould (Australia) Liz Smylie | 6–2, 6–4 |
| Win | 26. | Aug 1983 | Mahwah, U.S. | Hard | (United Kingdom) Jo Durie | (South Africa) Rosalyn Fairbank (United States) Candy Reynolds | 4–6, 7–5, 6–3 |
| Win | 27. | Oct 1983 | U.S. Indoors | Carpet (i) | (United States) Billie Jean King | (United States) Kathy Jordan (United States) Barbara Potter | 3–6, 6–3, 6–4 |
| Loss | 28. | Nov 1983 | Brisbane, Australia | Grass | (United States) Pam Shriver | (United Kingdom) Anne Hobbs (Australia) Wendy Turnbull | 3–6, 4–6 |
| Win | 29. | Jan 1984 | Washington DC, U.S. | Carpet (i) | (United States) Barbara Potter | (United States) Leslie Allen (United States) Anne White | 6–1, 6–7, 6–2 |
| Loss | 30. | Feb 1984 | Houston, U.S. | Carpet | (United States) Barbara Potter | (Socialist Federal Republic of Yugoslavia) Mima Jaušovec (United States) Anne White | 4–6, 6–3, 6–7 |
| Win | 31. | Feb 1984 | Chicago, U.S. | Carpet | (United States) Billie Jean King | (United States) Barbara Potter (United States) Pam Shriver | 5–7, 6–3, 6–3 |
| Win | 32. | Mar 1984 | Boston, U.S. | Carpet (i) | (United States) Barbara Potter | (United States) Andrea Leand (United States) Mary-Lou Daniels | 7–6, 6–0 |
| Loss | 33. | Apr 1984 | Hilton Head, U.S. | Clay | (United Kingdom) Anne Hobbs | (West Germany) Claudia Kohde-Kilsch (Czechoslovakia) Hana Mandlíková | 5–7, 2–6 |
| Loss | 34. | Sep 1984 | Fort Lauderdale, U.S. | Hard | (United States) Barbara Potter | (United States) Martina Navratilova (Australia) Liz Smylie | 6–2, 2–6, 3–6 |
| Loss | 35. | Oct 1984 | Brighton, England | Carpet (i) | (United States) Barbara Potter | (United States) Alycia Moulton (United States) Paula Smith | 7–6, 3–6, 5–7 |
| Loss | 36. | Nov 1984 | Sydney, Australia | Grass | (Australia) Wendy Turnbull | (West Germany) Claudia Kohde-Kilsch (Czechoslovakia) Helena Suková | 2–6, 6–7 |
| Loss | 37. | Jan 1985 | Denver, U.S. | Carpet (i) | (United States) Leslie Allen | (United States) Mary-Lou Daniels (United States) Robin White | 6–1, 4–6, 5–7 |
| Win | 38. | Mar 1985 | Dallas, U.S. | Carpet (i) | (United States) Barbara Potter | (Netherlands) Marcella Mesker (France) Pascale Paradis | 5–7, 6–4, 7–6 |
| Win | 39. | Jun 1985 | Birmingham, England | Grass | (United States) Terry Holladay | (United States) Elise Burgin (United States) Alycia Moulton | 6–4, 5–7, 6–3 |
| Win | 40. | Oct 1986 | Tokyo, Japan | Hard | (United States) Sandy Collins | (United States) Susan Mascarin (United States) Betsy Nagelsen | 6–1, 6–2 |
| Loss | 41. | Oct 1986 | Singapore | Hard | (United States) Sandy Collins | (United States) Anna-Maria Fernandez (New Zealand) Julie Richardson | 3–6, 2–6 |
| Loss | 42. | Apr 1987 | Tokyo, Japan | Hard | (United States) Sandy Collins | (United States) Kathy Jordan (United States) Betsy Nagelsen | 3–6, 5–7 |
| Loss | 43. | Apr 1987 | Taipei, Taiwan | Carpet | (United States) Sandy Collins | (United States) Cammy MacGregor (United States) Cynthia MacGregor | 6–7, 7–5, 4–6 |
| Loss | 44. | Aug 1987 | San Diego, U.S. | Hard | (United States) Elise Burgin | (Czechoslovakia) Jana Novotná (France) Catherine Suire | 3–6, 4–6 |

== Grand Slam singles performance timeline ==
Key
| W | F | SF | QF | #R | RR | Q# | P# | DNQ | A | Z# | PO | G | S | B | NMS | NTI | P | NH |

(W) winner; (F) finalist; (SF) semifinalist; (QF) quarterfinalist; (#R) rounds 4, 3, 2, 1; (RR) round-robin stage; (Q#) qualification round; (P#) preliminary round; (DNQ) did not qualify; (A) absent; (Z#) Davis/Fed Cup Zonal Group (with number indication) or (PO) play-off; (G) gold, (S) silver or (B) bronze Olympic/Paralympic medal; (NMS) not a Masters tournament; (NTI) not a Tier I tournament; (P) postponed; (NH) not held; (SR) strike rate (events won / competed); (W–L) win–loss record.

| Tournament | 1969 | 1970 | 1971 | 1972 | 1973 | 1974 | 1975 | 1976 | 1977 | | 1978 | 1979 | 1980 | 1981 | 1982 | 1983 | 1984 | 1985 | 1986 | 1987 | 1988 | SR |
|---|---|---|---|---|---|---|---|---|---|---|---|---|---|---|---|---|---|---|---|---|---|---|
| Australian Open | A | A | QF | A | A | A | A | A | A | A | A | F | 1R | 2R | 3R | 3R | QF | 1R | NH | 1R | 1R | 0 / 10 |
| French Open | A | A | A | P1 | 2R | A | 1R | A | 1R | | 1R | 2R | A | A | 2R | A | A | A | A | 1R | A | 0 / 8 |
| Wimbledon | A | 3R | A | 2R | 1R | 2R | 2R | A | 1R | | 2R | 1R | 1R | 3R | 2R | 2R | 1R | 1R | A | 3R | 1R | 0 / 16 |
| US Open | 1R | 3R | A | 3R | 1R | 2R | 1R | 2R | 1R | | 2R | 1R | 2R | 4R | 1R | 1R | 1R | 1R | 1R | 1R | A | 0 / 18 |
| Strike rate | 0 / 1 | 0 / 2 | 0 / 1 | 0 / 3 | 0 / 3 | 0 / 2 | 0 / 3 | 0 / 1 | 0 / 3 | | 0 / 3 | 0 / 4 | 0 / 3 | 0 / 3 | 0 / 4 | 0 / 3 | 0 / 3 | 0 / 3 | 0 / 1 | 0 / 4 | 0 / 2 | 0 / 52 |

Note: The Australian Open was held twice in 1977, in January and December.

== See also ==
- Performance timelines for all female tennis players since 1978 who reached at least one Grand Slam final
