= Linda Tuero =

American tennis player

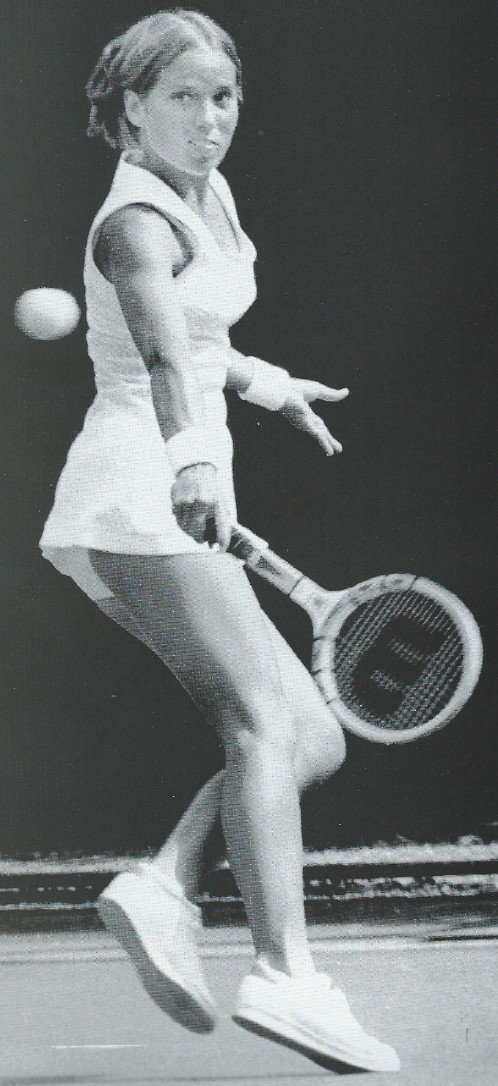
- Country (sports): United States
- Residence: Sea Island, Georgia, U.S.
- Born: October 21, 1950 (age 74); Metairie, Louisiana, U.S.
- Height: 5 ft 4 in (163 cm)
- Turned pro: 1972
- Retired: 1973
- Plays: Right-handed (one-handed backhand)
- College: Tulane University

Singles
- Career record: unknown value
- Career titles: 5
- Highest ranking: No. 10 (1972)

Grand Slam singles results
- French Open: QF (1971)
- Wimbledon: 3R (1971)
- US Open: 3R (1968, 1971)

Doubles
- Career record: unknown value

Grand Slam doubles results
- French Open: 3R (1969)
- Wimbledon: 2R (1972)
- US Open: QF (1969)

Linda Tuero (born October 21, 1950) is an American tennis player and paleoanthropologist. She won six U.S Junior Titles and three U.S. Women's Titles. She reached the quarter-finals of the French Open in 1971, and won the singles titles at the Italian Open in 1972. She represented the United States in the Wightman Cup and Federation Cup teams in 1972 and 1973 and served as the Federation Cup Captain in 1973. Tuero was ranked in the U.S. Top Ten Women Singles for four years and in 1972 was ranked No. 10 in the World.

== Biography ==
Linda Tuero was born in Metairie, Louisiana. She started playing tennis at the age of 11 and was taught by Emmett Paré throughout her career. At age 13, she won the US National Girl's 14 Singles Championship and by the time she had graduated from high school, she had won six national titles: the 1964 US National Girl's 14 Singles Championship, the 1966 US National Girl's 16 Singles Championship, the 1966 US National Girl's 16 Doubles Championship, the 1967 US National Girl's 18 Clay Court Singles Championship, the 1968 US National Girl's 18 Clay Court Singles Championship, and the 1968 National Interscholastic Championship.

Tuero was the first woman to be awarded an athletic scholarship to Tulane University, the first woman to play on a Tulane varsity team and the first woman to win a varsity Green Wave letter. When she joined, Tulane didn't have a women's tennis team, so she played for the men's team. Many men's teams from opposing universities, including Georgia Tech and Northwestern, refused to play against her, so over three seasons, she only played nine matches, winning eight of them.

While a member of the Tulane tennis team, she played on the women's professional tennis circuit but kept her amateur status. During this time, she won the singles and doubles titles at Cincinnati in 1968 and three more national titles: the 1969 US Amateur Championship, 1970 US Amateur Championship and the 1970 US Open Clay Court Championship.

In 1971, she was runner-up in the US Open Clay Courts, losing to Billie Jean King in the finals, reached the quarterfinals of the French Open, and was a finalist in Cincinnati.

In 1972, playing her first year as a professional, Linda won the Italian Open. She also won the first International Tournament of Madrid (Madrid Open) and was a semifinalist in the US Open Clay Courts, Canadian Open, WTA German Open, and Cincinnati with losses to Chris Evert, Evonne Goolagong, and Margaret Court. In 1973, she had a win over Martina Navratilova in the Fort Lauderdale Classic.

Tuero represented the US in the Wightman Cup and Federation Cup teams in 1972 and 1973, serving as the Federation Cup captain in 1973

Her top career world rankings included No 1 in Women-Under-21 and No 10 in World (Women). She has been inducted into the Halls of Fame of Tulane University, Louisiana Tennis Tennis Hall of Fame, and USTA Southern Tennis Hall of Fame.

== Personal life ==
In 1968, she graduated from St. Martin's Episcopal School in Metairie, Louisiana. In 1971, she graduated cum laude from Tulane with a major in psychology.

In 1973, while working as an extra in The Exorcist, she met the author William Peter Blatty. They were married in July 1975 and had two children, restaurant entrepreneur Billy and photojournalist J.T. Blatty. She also appeared in The Ninth Configuration, which he wrote.

After her divorce from Blatty, she married William Paul. She had another son during this marriage. She is now married to Dr. William Lindsley who is a former business consultant and former dean and professor at Boston College, Vanderbilt University Owen School of Management, and Belmont University Graduate School of Business.

In 2000, Tuero enrolled in the Tulane Graduate School, and in 2004, she graduated with a master's degree in anthropology, specializing in the field of paleoanthropology. In 2005, she was part of an excavation in the Lake Turkana region of northern Kenya.

== Career finals ==
=== Singles (5 titles, 6 runners-up) ===
Result	No.	Date	Tournament	Location	Surface	Opponent	Score
Win	1.	Jul 1968	Tri-State Tournament	Cincinnati	Clay	(United States) Tory Fretz	6–1, 6–2
Loss	2.	Jul 1969	U.S. Clay Court Open	Indianapolis	Clay	(France) Gail Sherriff Chanfreau	2–6, 2–6
Win	3.	Aug 1970	U.S. Clay Court Open	Indianapolis	Clay	(France) Gail Sherriff Chanfreau	7–5, 6–1
Loss	4.	Aug 1971	Western Championships	Cincinnati	Clay	(United Kingdom) Virginia Wade	3–6, 3–6
Loss	5.	Aug, 1971	U.S. Clay Court Open	Indianapolis	Clay	(United States) Billie Jean King	4–6, 5–7
Loss	6.	Dec 1971	Border Championships	East London	Clay	(South Africa) Ilana Kloss	3–6, 2–6
Win	7.	Jan 1972	Eastern Province Championships	Port Elizabeth	Clay	(United States) Sharon Walsh	6–1, 6–2
Loss	8.	Jan 1972	Western Province Championships	Cape Town	Clay	(South Africa) Patricia Pretorius	3–6, 4–6
Win	9.	Apr 1972	Melia Trophy	Madrid	Clay	(Czechoslovakia) Alena Palmeova	6–3, 6–1
Win	10.	May 1972	Italian Open	Rome	Clay	(Soviet Union) Olga Morozova	6–4, 6–3
Loss	11.	Jun 1972	German Open	Hamburg	Clay	(West Germany) Helga Masthoff	3–6, 6–3, 6–8

== Career highlights ==
As an Amateur:

- Winner, 1964 US National Championships - Girl's 14 Singles
- Winner, 1966 US National Championships - Girl's 16 Singles and Doubles
- Winner, 1967 and 1968 US National Clay Court Singles Championships - Girl's 18
- Finalist, 1968 US Grass Court Women's Singles
- Winner, 1968 National Interscholastic Championship
- Finalist, 1968 US Open Clay Court Women's Singles (to Nancy Richey)
- Finalist, 1969 US Open Clay Court Women's Doubles
- Winner, 1969 and 1970 US Amateur Championship
- Finalist, 1969 US Amateur Mixed Doubles
- Quarter-finalist, 1969 Western & Southern Open (to Gail Chanfreau)
- Semi-finalist, 1970 Canadian Open Women's Singles (to Rosemary Casals)
- Semi-finalist, 1970 Western & Southern Open Wonmen's Singles (to Nancy Richey)
- Winner, 1970 US Women's Amateur Singles
- Finalist, 1970 Women's Collegiate Women's Singles

As a Professional:

- Finalist, 1971 US Open Clay Courts Women's Doubles
- Quarter-finalist, 1971 French Open (to Marijke Schaar)
- Quarter-finalist, 1971 Western & Southern Open (Cincinnati Masters) Women's Singles (to Evonne Goolagong)
- Semi-finalist, 1972 US Open Clay Court Women's Singles (to Evonne Goolagong)
- Semi-finalist, 1972 Canadian Open Women's Singles (to Evonne Goolagong)
- Semi-finalist, 1972 Western Open Women's Singles (to Margaret Court)
- Finalist, 1972 Nice Women's Singles
- Semi-finalist, 1972 Eastern Grass Court Open Women's Singles
- Finalist, 1972 Western Province South Africa Women's Singles
- Winner, 1972 Wightman Cup
- Semi-finalist, 1972 Federation Cup (to Johannesburg)
- Runner-up, 1972 Bonne Bell Cup against Australia
- Semi-finalist, 1973 Fort Lauderdale (to Chris Evert)
- Semi-finalist, 1973 Western (to Margaret Court)
- Semi-finalist, 1971 Baastad Open (to Benzer)
- Finalist, 1973 Marie O. Clark (to Chris Evert)
- Captain, 1973 Federation Cup
- Winner, 1973 Wightman Cup
- Finalist, 1973 Cleveland Heights Women's Singles
- Semi-finalist, 1973 US Open Clay Courts Women's Singles (to Chris Evert)

== Awards and honors ==
- Inducted into the USTA Southern Tennis Hall of Fame in 1995
- Louisiana Tennis Hall of Fame | Patrons Foundation
- Ranked in Women's US Top 10 Women's four times (1968 : No. 8, 1969 : No. 10, 1971 : No. 8, 1972 : No. 7)
- Inducted into Tulane Athletic Hall Of Fame (1969-1971)
- Tulane Scholarship for Men's tennis Team
- 1968 VFW Athlete of the Year New Orleans
- 1969 VFW Athlete of the Year New Orleans
- 1969 Louisiana Outstanding Athlete of the Year
- 1970 VFW Athlete of the Year New Orleans

== Articles ==
- Linda Tuero Captures Girls Tennis Crown
- ONLY At Tulane "Tradition - Tulane Tennis Legend Linda Tuero"
- A First At Tulane
- New Orleans Yesterday and Today: A Guide to the City
- The Right Set: A Tennis Anthology
- 40 Years Ago In Tennis – Bud Collins Summarizes The Epic Year
- 1973 US Wightman Cup Team
