= Laura Rossouw =

South African tennis player

- Full name: Laura Rossouw Le Sueur
- Country (sports): South Africa
- Born: 15 July 1946 (age 79) Durban, South Africa

Singles
- Career titles: 3

Grand Slam singles results
- French Open: 3R (1974)
- Wimbledon: 3R (1966, 1972)
- US Open: 2R (1968, 1973)

Doubles
- Career titles: 2

Grand Slam doubles results
- French Open: QF (1969, 1970)
- Wimbledon: QF (1972)
- US Open: 1R (1968, 1972, 1973)

Grand Slam mixed doubles results
- French Open: 2R (1969)
- Wimbledon: 3R (1968, 1969)
- US Open: QF (1968)

Laura Rossouw (born 15 July 1946) is a South African former tennis player who was active in the late 1960s and first half of the 1970s.

== Tennis career ==
During her career Rossouw won three singles and two doubles titles. She toured the European circuit for the first time in 1966.

Her best singles results at a Grand Slam tournament were reaching the third round at the 1966 and 1972 Wimbledon Championships. In the doubles and mixed doubles events she reached he quarterfinal on four occasions. In the doubles and mixed doubles events she reached he quarterfinal on four occasions.

In December 1970 Rossouw competed for the South African Fed Cup team in the World Group, winning three of the four matches she played.

== Career finals ==
=== Singles (3 titles, 1 runner-up) ===
Result	W/L	Date	Tournament	Surface	Opponent	Score
Win	1–0	May 1970	Naples, Italy	Clay	(Australia) Lesley Hunt	6–1, 6–0
Win	2–0	Jun 1970	Bielefeld, West Germany	?	(United States) Kathleen Harter	6–2, 6–1
Loss	2–1	Jul 1971	Austrian Open, Kitzbühel, Austria	Clay	(United States) Billie Jean King	2–6, 6–4, 5–7
Win	3–1	Jul 1972	Turkish Championships, Istanbul, Turkey	Clay	(United States) Julie Anthony	6–8, 6–2, 6–4

=== Doubles (2 titles, 4 runner-ups) ===
Result	W/L	Date	Tournament	Surface	Partner	Opponent	Score
Loss	0–1	Dec 1967	Borders Championships, London, England	?	(South Africa) Maryna Godwin	(United Kingdom) Winnie Shaw (United Kingdom) Nell Truman	4–6, 3–6
Win	1–1	Aug 1970	Bavarian Open, Munich, Germany	?	(South Africa) Brenda Kirk	(Australia) Fay Moore-Toyne (United Kingdom) Nell Truman	6–4, 6–4
Loss	1–2	Jan 1971	Tasmanian Championships, Hobart, Australia	?	(South Africa) Brenda Kirk	(United States) Patti Hogan (Soviet Union) Olga Morozova	2–6, 0–6
Loss	1–3	Apr 1971	South African Open, Johannesburg, South Africa	Hard	(South Africa) Brenda Kirk	(Australia) Margaret Court (Australia) Evonne Goolagong	3–6, 2–6
Win	2–3	Jul 1971	Swiss Open, Gstaad, Switzerland	Clay	(South Africa) Brenda Kirk	(France) Françoise Dürr (Italy) Lea Pericoli	8–6, 6–3
Loss	2–4	Jun 1973	German Open, Hamburg, West Germany	Hard	(United States) Kristien Kemmer	(West Germany) Helga Niessen Masthoff (West Germany) Heide Orth	1–6, 2–6
