= Karen Krantzcke =

Australian tennis player

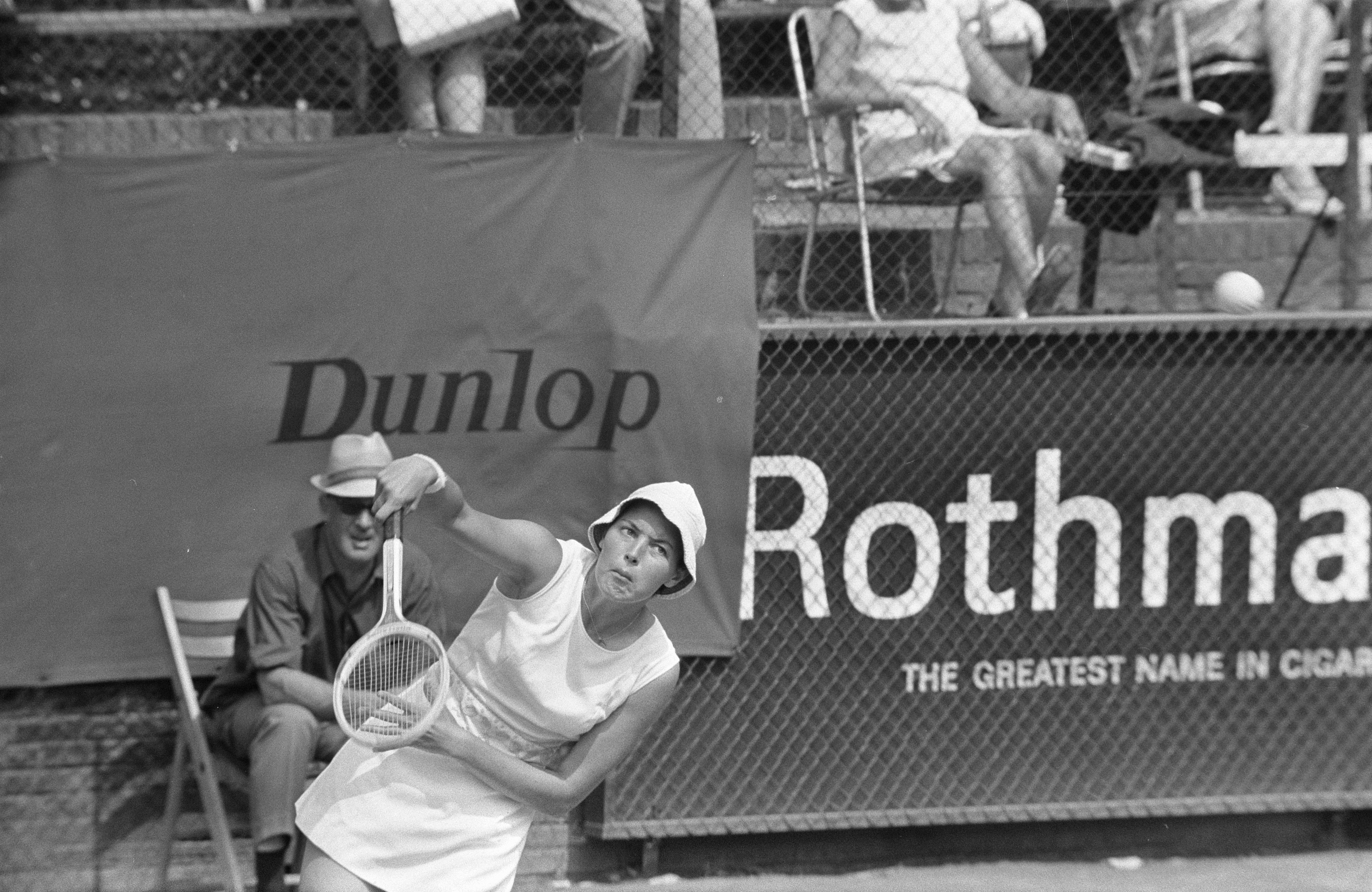
- Country (sports): Australia
- Born: 1 February 1946 Brisbane, Australia
- Died: 11 April 1977 (aged 31) Tallahassee, Florida, US

Singles
- Career record: no value
- Highest ranking: No. 9 (1970)

Grand Slam singles results
- Australian Open: SF (1970, 1977^{Jan})
- French Open: SF (1970)
- Wimbledon: QF (1970)
- US Open: QF (1969)

Doubles
- Career record: no value

Grand Slam doubles results
- Australian Open: W (1968)
- French Open: SF (1969, 1972)
- Wimbledon: F (1974)
- US Open: QF (1968, 1973, 1974)

Grand Slam mixed doubles results
- Australian Open: SF (1968)
- French Open: 3R (1969, 1970)
- Wimbledon: SF (1969, 1973)
- US Open: 2R

Team competitions
- Fed Cup: W (1970)

Karen Krantzcke (1 February 1946 – 11 April 1977) was an Australian tennis player. She achieved a world top ten singles ranking in 1970. In her short career, she made the quarterfinals or better at each of the four Grand Slam championships in both singles and doubles. She also won the Australian Open in doubles, and assisted Australia to victory in the Federation Cup.

At the age of 31, Krantzcke died from a heart attack while jogging in Florida, United States, where she was playing on the Challenger circuit.

== Early career ==
Krantzcke, a tall right-handed player, achieved much junior success including winning the Australian junior singles title in 1966.

== Professional career ==
Her most successful season came in 1969/70. After reaching the US Open quarterfinals, she reached the semifinals at the Australian Open and the French Open and then reached the quarterfinals at Wimbledon. At these tournaments, she upset highly ranked players like Virginia Wade, Françoise Dürr, and Judy Tegart Dalton.

During this time, she also combined with Dalton to win the Federation Cup for Australia, remaining undefeated in singles and doubles on the German clay.

After Wimbledon in 1970, 'Kran' took eighteen months off the tour after discovering she was hypoglycemic.

On returning to the tour, she was never able to get back to her best form. She continued to do well in her home Australian championship and reached the semi-finals for the second time in 1977. During her career she defeated Margaret Court, Evonne Goolagong Cawley four times, Billie Jean King twice, Kerry Melville Reid four times, and Virginia Wade. At the New South Wales Open in 1974 Krantzcke defeated Evonne Goolagong Cawley in the final 6–2, 6–3 and at Strathfield in 1969 she defeated Evonne Goolagong Cawley in the final 6–3, 6–4.

== Death ==
While playing on the Challenger circuit in the US in 1977, Krantzcke suffered a heart attack while jogging. In response to her untimely death, the WTA instituted the Karen Krantzcke Sportsmanship Award which is still awarded annually to an active WTA Tour player after a vote by fellow tennis pros.

A street in the Canberra suburb of Nicholls, Australian Capital Territory, Krantzcke Crescent, is named after the tennis star.

== Team results ==
Krantzcke played twice in Federation Cup for Australia; in 1966 and 1970. She also represented Australia in the Bonne Bell Cup in 1974.

== Grand Slam finals ==
=== Doubles (1 title, 3 runners-up) ===
Result	Year	Championship	Surface	Partner	Opponents	Score
Win	1968	Australian Championships	Grass	(Australia) Kerry Melville	(Australia) Judy Tegart Dalton (Australia) Lesley Turner Bowrey	6–4, 3–6, 6–2
Loss	1970	Australian Open	Grass	(Australia) Kerry Melville	(Australia) Margaret Court (Australia) Judy Tegart Dalton	3–6, 1–6
Loss	1972	Australian Open	Grass	(Australia) Patricia Coleman	(Australia) Helen Gourlay (Australia) Kerry Harris	0–6, 4–6
Loss	1974	Wimbledon	Grass	(Australia) Helen Gourlay	(Australia) Evonne Goolagong (United States) Peggy Michel	6–2, 4–6, 3–6

== Grand Slam singles tournament timeline ==
Key
W	F	SF	QF	#R	RR	Q#	DNQ	A	NH

(W) winner; (F) finalist; (SF) semifinalist; (QF) quarterfinalist; (#R) rounds 4, 3, 2, 1; (RR) round-robin stage; (Q#) qualification round; (DNQ) did not qualify; (A) absent; (NH) not held; (SR) strike rate (events won / competed); (W–L) win–loss record.

Tournament	1964	1965	1966	1967	1968	1969	1970	1971	1972	1973	1974	1975	1976	1977	
Australia	2R	2R	3R	3R	QF	QF	SF	A	2R	QF	QF	A	A	SF	A
France	A	A	3R	2R	3R	1R	SF	A	3R	A	A	A	A	A	
Wimbledon	A	A	4R	3R	2R	4R	QF	A	2R	2R	4R	A	A	A	
United States	A	A	A	A	3R	QF	A	A	3R	3R	3R	A	A	A	

Note: The Australian Open was held twice in 1977, in January and December.
