= Kristy Pigeon =

American tennis player

- Country (sports): United States
- Born: August 12, 1950 (age 75)
- Retired: 1975
- Plays: Left-handed

Singles

Grand Slam singles results
- French Open: 3R (1970)
- Wimbledon: 4R (1968, 1969)
- US Open: 2R (1972)

Doubles

Grand Slam doubles results
- French Open: 3R (1969)
- Wimbledon: 2R (1968, 1971, 1972)
- US Open: QF (1968, 1971)

Kristy Pigeon (born August 12, 1950) is an American retired tennis player who was active at the end of the 1960s and beginning of the 1970s.

== Career ==
Pigeon won the Junior Wimbledon title in July 1968, defeating Australian Lesley Hunt in two sets. Directly following Wimbledon, she gained the singles title at the Welsh Open Championships in Newport with a victory in the final over Fay Moore. In August 1968 she won the singles title at the Pennsylvania Lawn Tennis Championships in Haverford. Later that month she won the United States girls lawn tennis championship in Philadelphia after a victory in the final against Linda Tuero. Her best singles performance at a Grand Slam tournament was reaching the fourth round at Wimbledon in 1968 and 1969. In 1970, she joined the "Original Nine" in their breakaway from the United States Lawn Tennis Association (USLTA) to create a separate women's tour when she was 20 years old. She later stated, "I think a lot of those original true feminists were missing the point by burning bras. In a way, they didn't make nearly as many waves as we tennis players did. We demonstrated that as sportspeople we were as interesting as the men. Our competition was stimulating to watch and we could pull the people in. For me, that's a more powerful way of establishing equality."
