= Denise Carter =

American tennis player

- Full name: Denise Carter-Triolo
- Country (sports): United States
- Born: July 31, 1950 (age 74)

Singles

Grand Slam singles results
- French Open: 1R (1970)
- Wimbledon: 3R (1969, 1970, 1971)
- US Open: 3R (1968, 1969)

Doubles

Grand Slam doubles results
- French Open: 2R (1970)
- Wimbledon: 3R (1971, 1972)
- US Open: 2R (1970)

Denise Carter (born July 31, 1950), also known as Denise Carter-Triolo, is an American former tennis player. She was ranked eighth in the United States in 1969, tenth in 1970, and tenth again in 1971. She reached the third round of the U.S. Open in 1968 and 1969 and the third round of Wimbledon in 1969, 1970, and 1971.

She is the daughter of tennis player Nick Carter.
