= 1966 U.S. National Championships – Men's singles =

Men's singles
- 1966 U.S. National Championships

Final
- Champion: (Australia) Fred Stolle
- Runner-up: (Australia) John Newcombe
- Score: 4–6, 12–10, 6–3, 6–4

Details
- Draw: 128
- Seeds: 8

Events
Singles	men	women
Doubles	men	women
- U.S. National Championships

Unseeded Fred Stolle defeated John Newcombe 4–6, 12–10, 6–3, 6–4 in the final to win the men's singles tennis title at the 1966 U.S. National Championships.

== Seeds ==
The seeded players are listed below. Fred Stolle is the champion; others show the round in which they were eliminated.

1. (Spain) Manuel Santana (semifinals)
2. (Australia) Roy Emerson (semifinals)
3. (United States) Dennis Ralston (fourth round)
4. (Australia) Tony Roche (third round)
5. (United States) Arthur Ashe (third round)
6. (South Africa) Cliff Drysdale (third round)
7. (United States) Clark Graebner (quarterfinals)
8. (United States) Cliff Richey (second round)

== Draw ==
=== Key ===
- Q = Qualifier
- WC = Wild card
- LL = Lucky loser
- r = Retired

=== Final eight ===
Quarterfinals
1	(Spain) Manuel Santana	6	6	8	5	6
(Australia) Bill Bowrey	8	2	6	7	4
(United Kingdom) Mark Cox	6	1	6	2	1
(Australia) John Newcombe	3	6	3	6	6
7	(United States) Clark Graebner	3	4	2
(Australia) Fred Stolle	6	6	6
(Australia) Owen Davidson	12	4	3	2
2	(Australia) Roy Emerson	10	6	6	6

Semifinals
1	(Spain) Manuel Santana	3	4	8	6
(Australia) John Newcombe	6	6	6	8
(Australia) Fred Stolle	6	6	6
2	(Australia) Roy Emerson	4	1	1

Final
(Australia) John Newcombe	6	10	3	4
(Australia) Fred Stolle	4	12	6	6

=== Earlier rounds ===
==== Section 1 ====
First round
1	(Spain) Santana	6	6	6
(Switzerland) Berli	1	1	2
(Canada) Tutvin	3	6	6	6
(United States) Mangan	6	2	1	1
(South Africa) Moore	6	6	6
(United States) Darrah	2	4	1
(United States) Reese	6	6	7
(Puerto Rico) Rosello	1	4	5
(United States) Tym	1	6	6	6
(United States) Sweeney	6	1	4	2
(United States) McKinley	6	6	6
(United Kingdom) Bovett	4	1	1
(United States) Marcin	7	9	6
(Philippines) Yang	5	7	1
(Puerto Rico) Carrero	6	7	6
(United States) Sack	3	5	4

Second round
1	(Spain) Santana	6	6	6
(Canada) Tutvin	1	1	3
(South Africa) Moore	6	6	6
(United States) Reese	4	2	2
(United States) Tym	2	3	4
(United States) McKinley	6	6	6
(United States) Marcin	2	4	6	4
(Puerto Rico) Carrero	6	6	3	6

Third round
1	(Spain) Santana	3	6	6	8
(South Africa) Moore	6	2	3	6
(United States) McKinley	6	6	6
(Puerto Rico) Carrero	2	4	0

Fourth round
1	(Spain) Santana	9	9	8
(United States) McKinley	7	7	6

==== Section 2 ====
First round
6	(South Africa) Drysdale	6	6	6
(United States) Gorman	3	3	1
(United States) Cantin	9	1	3	6	7
(United States) Kovaleski	7	6	6	1	5
(Australia) Bowrey	6	6	6
(United States) Mudd	1	0	0
(United States) Scott	6	6	6
(United States) Sullivan	3	3	4
(Mexico) Subirats	6	6	2	3	6
(United States) Seewagen	3	4	6	6	3
(Belgium) De Gronckel	2	6	6	6
(United States) Lambert	6	4	4	2
(United States) Osborne	6	6	6	21
(United States) Buchholz	8	3	3	19
(France) Beust	6	6	6
(United States) Watson	2	3	4

Second round
6	(South Africa) Drysdale	6	6	6
(United States) Cantin	3	2	3
(Australia) Bowrey	6	6	6
(United States) Scott	4	3	4
(Mexico) Subirats	6	3	9	6	6
(Belgium) De Gronckel	4	6	11	3	0
(United States) Osborne	6	6	7
(France) Beust	3	4	5

Third round
6	(South Africa) Drysdale	1	6	6
(Australia) Bowrey	6	8	8
(Mexico) Subirats	7	8	2	1
(United States) Osborne	9	6	6	6

Fourth round
(Australia) Bowrey	6	6	6
(United States) Osborne	3	2	4

==== Section 3 ====
First round
4	(Australia) Roche	6	6	6
(Mexico) Lara	4	3	4
(United States) Stewart	14	7	2	3	6
(Philippines) Villarete	12	5	6	6	3
(United States) Seixas	6	6	2	2	6
(United States) Smith	3	4	6	6	4
(United Kingdom) Cox	6	6	6
(United States) Stockton	4	2	2
(Costa Rica) Obando	7	6	3	7
(United States) Estep	5	4	6	5
(United States) Jackson	9	6	3	6
(United States) Steele III	7	1	6	0
(New Zealand) Crookenden	6	6	8	5	6
(United States) Avoyer	2	2	10	7	4
(United States) McManus	7	6	6
(United States) Pasarell	5	4	2

Second round
4	(Australia) Roche	6	8	6	8
(United States) Stewart	4	10	3	6
(United States) Seixas	3	6	3
(United Kingdom) Cox	6	8	6
(Costa Rica) Obando	0	4	1
(United States) Jackson	6	6	6
(New Zealand) Crookenden	1	6	5	6	6
(United States) McManus	6	3	7	4	4

Third round
4	(Australia) Roche	8	4	5
(United Kingdom) Cox	10	6	7
(United States) Jackson	4	6	2	2
(New Zealand) Crookenden	6	4	6	6

Fourth round
(United Kingdom) Cox	10	6	7
(New Zealand) Crookenden	8	4	5

==== Section 4 ====
First round
5	(United States) Ashe	15	6	6
(United States) Roemer	3	2	0
(United States) Holmberg	6	6	6
(United States) Cromwell	4	2	4
(Australia) Newcombe	8	3	6	6
(United States) Pickens	6	6	0	4
(South Africa) Ryan	6	6	6
(United States) Pressly	1	1	2
(West Germany) Bungert	6	6	6
(United States) Sprengelmeyer	1	2	4
(Chile) Fillol	6	6	4	6
(United States) Fishbach	2	4	6	3
(United States) McKinley	3	6	2	6	6
(United States) Montgomery	6	4	6	2	4
(Italy) Tacchini	10	6	6	6
(Jamaica) Lumsden	12	2	3	2

Second round
5	(United States) Ashe	8	4	6	6
(United States) Holmberg	6	6	3	4
(Australia) Newcombe	6	16	6
(South Africa) Ryan	3	14	4
(West Germany) Bungert	9	6	8
(Chile) Fillol	7	3	6
(United States) McKinley	2	r
(Italy) Tacchini	1

Third round
5	(United States) Ashe	2	3	4
(Australia) Newcombe	6	6	6
(West Germany) Bungert	6	6	6
(Italy) Tacchini	0	0	1

Fourth round
(Australia) Newcombe	9	5	6	6	6
(West Germany) Bungert	11	7	2	2	2

==== Section 5 ====
First round
(United States) Dell	6	6	6	6
(United States) Kesl	8	1	0	1
(United States) Guerry	6	6	3	7
(Peru) Olmedo	4	4	6	5
(Mexico) Loyo-Mayo	4	6	6	6
(Australia) Stone	6	4	2	3
(United Kingdom) Stilwell	6	6	6
(United States) Glass	0	4	3
(United States) Power	16	6	6
(United States) Cheney	14	3	4
(United States) Schloss	6	6	6
(West Germany) Spannagel	4	2	2
(United States) Leach	6	3	2	11	8
(United States) Dell	3	6	6	9	6
7	(United States) Graebner	6	7	6
(Ecuador) Guzmán	2	5	2

Second round
(United States) Dell	6	6	3	6
(United States) Guerry	4	4	6	0
(Mexico) Loyo-Mayo	3	2	6
(United Kingdom) Stilwell	6	6	8
(United States) Power	6	6	6
(United States) Schloss	0	4	1
(United States) Leach	2	2	3
7	(United States) Graebner	6	6	6

Third round
(United States) Dell	7	3	8	4
(United Kingdom) Stilwell	5	6	10	6
(United States) Power	4	2	6	1
7	(United States) Graebner	6	6	3	6

Fourth round
(United Kingdom) Stilwell	11	6	3	5
7	(United States) Graebner	9	8	6	7

==== Section 6 ====
First round
(Australia) Stolle	6	6	6
(United States) Gorski	2	4	4
(United States) Barth	6	6	6
(United States) Kourides	3	1	0
(Canada) Carpenter	6	2	6	6	6
(United States) Brown	8	6	0	4	2
(France) Contet	6	6	6
(United States) Howe	4	2	3
(United States) Beck	6	6	6
(United States) Carrington	2	1	1
(Mexico) Osuna	4	6	4	6	6
(Brazil) Barnes	6	4	6	4	4
(Australia) Mulligan	4	6	6	6
(United States) Karp	6	2	3	2
3	(United States) Ralston	6	6	7
(India) Singh	1	3	5

Second round
(Australia) Stolle	6	6	6
(United States) Barth	4	1	4
(Canada) Carpenter	4	6	2
(France) Contet	6	8	6
(United States) Beck	5	2	5
(Mexico) Osuna	7	6	7
(Australia) Mulligan	1	4	3
3	(United States) Ralston	6	6	6

Third round
(Australia) Stolle	10	6	8
(France) Contet	8	2	6
(Mexico) Osuna	1	4	3
3	(United States) Ralston	6	6	6

Fourth round
(Australia) Stolle	7	6	9
3	(United States) Ralston	5	3	7

==== Section 7 ====
First round
(United States) Neely	10	4	6	4	8
(Ecuador) Zuleta	8	6	4	6	6
(Australia) Ruffels	6	6	6
(United States) Scwitters	1	0	0
(United States) Froehling	6	6	6
(United States) Tully	3	3	1
(South Africa) Van Lingen	4	7	6	5	6
(United States) Howe	6	5	3	7	3
(United States) Powless	6	6	6
(United States) Conner	4	3	4
(Mexico) García	6	2	6	3	12
(Jamaica) Russell	3	6	4	6	10
(Australia) Davidson	6	6	6
(United States) Howard	0	4	3
8	(United States) Richey	6	6	6
(United States) Jennings	3	2	3

Second round
(United States) Neely	1	6	3
(Australia) Ruffels	6	8	6
(United States) Froehling	6	6	6
(South Africa) Van Lingen	1	1	2
(United States) Powless	1	3	4
(Mexico) García	6	6	6
(Australia) Davidson	7	8	6
8	(United States) Richey	5	6	1

Third round
(Australia) Ruffels	3	10	6	6
(United States) Froehling	6	8	4	3
(Mexico) García	1	4	0
(Australia) Davidson	6	6	6

Fourth round
(Australia) Ruffels	6	2	1	1
(Australia) Davidson	3	6	6	6

==== Section 8 ====
First round
(West Germany) Buding	6	6	6
(United States) Tidball	1	4	3
(Australia) Keldie	2	2	6	10	6
(United States) Siska	6	6	0	8	1
(United States) Oehrlein	8	6	6
(United States) Rombeau	6	4	2
(United States) Riessen	6	7	7
(United States) Lutz	4	5	5
(United States) Leonard
(Ecuador) Olvera	w/o
(New Zealand) Gerrard	1	6	3	6	6
(United States) Hoehn	6	3	6	3	2
(United States) Harrison	6	1	8	11	13
(United States) Darley	3	6	10	9	11
2	(Australia) Emerson	6	9	9
(United Arab Republic) El Shafei	3	7	7

Second round
(West Germany) Buding	6	6	8	2	4
(Australia) Keldie	8	1	6	6	6
(United States) Oehrlein	1	2	4
(United States) Riessen	6	6	6
(United States) Leonard	4	3	2
(New Zealand) Gerrard	6	6	6
(United States) Harrison	6	1	6	2
2	(Australia) Emerson	4	6	8	6

Third round
(Australia) Keldie	3	1	4
(United States) Riessen	6	6	6
(New Zealand) Gerrard	0	4	1
2	(Australia) Emerson	6	6	6

Fourth round
(United States) Riessen	6	3	5	3
2	(Australia) Emerson	2	6	7	6

Preceded by 1966 Wimbledon Championships – Men's singles	Grand Slam men's singles	Succeeded by 1967 Australian Championships – Men's singles
