= 1967 U.S. National Championships – Men's singles =

Men's singles
- 1967 U.S. National Championships

Final
- Champion: (Australia) John Newcombe
- Runner-up: (United States) Clark Graebner
- Score: 6–4, 6–4, 8–6

Details
- Draw: 128
- Seeds: 8

Events
Singles	men	women
Doubles	men	women
- U.S. National Championships

John Newcombe defeated Clark Graebner 6–4, 6–4, 8–6 in the final to win the men's singles title at the 1967 U.S. National Championships.

== Seeds ==
The seeded players are listed below. John Newcombe is the champion; others show the round in which they were eliminated.

1. (Australia) John Newcombe (champion)
2. (Australia) Roy Emerson (quarterfinals)
3. n/a
4. (Socialist Federal Republic of Yugoslavia) Nikola Pilić (third round)
5. (South Africa) Cliff Drysdale (second round)
6. (United Kingdom) Roger Taylor (second round)
7. (United States) Clark Graebner (finalist)
8. (United States) Charlie Pasarell (third round)

== Draw ==
=== Key ===
- Q = Qualifier
- WC = Wild card
- LL = Lucky loser
- r = Retired

=== Final eight ===
Quarterfinals
1	(Australia) John Newcombe	4	6	7	6
(South Africa) Bob Hewitt	6	0	5	3
(United States) Eugene Scott	6	8	9
(Australia) Owen Davidson	3	6	7
(Denmark) Jan Leschly	7	6	2	6	8
(Brazil) Ronald Barnes	9	4	6	3	6
7	(United States) Clark Graebner	8	3	19	6
2	(Australia) Roy Emerson	6	6	17	1

Semifinals
1	(Australia) John Newcombe	6	6	6
(United States) Eugene Scott	4	3	3
(Denmark) Jan Leschly	6	6	5	4	5
7	(United States) Clark Graebner	3	3	7	6	7

Final
1	(Australia) John Newcombe	6	6	8
7	(United States) Clark Graebner	4	4	6

=== Earlier rounds ===
==== Section 1 ====
First round
1	(Australia) Newcombe	6	6	4	6
(United States) Estep	2	2	6	3
(United States) Darley	5	9	6	6
(United States) Mangan	7	7	1	3
(United States) Richey	6	6	6
(United States) Watson	1	3	1
(United States) Karp	9	7	1	6
(United States) Howe	7	5	6	4
(Peru) Acuna	6	6	6
(United States) Ruffin	4	2	0
(South Africa) Moore	4	4	6	6	6
(United States) Siska	6	6	3	4	3
(United States) Howe	7	3	6	6
(France) Chanfreau	5	6	3	2
(United States) Seewagen	6	6	4	6
(United States) Avoyer	2	4	6	4

Second round
1	(Australia) Newcombe	6	6	6
(United States) Darley	4	1	2
(United States) Richey	6	6	6
(United States) Karp	2	1	2
(Peru) Acuna	0	1	1
(South Africa) Moore	6	6	6
(United States) Howe	6	4	4	2
(United States) Seewagen	4	6	6	6

Third round
1	(Australia) Newcombe	13	6	4	6
(United States) Richey	11	2	6	3
(South Africa) Moore	6	11	4	6
(United States) Seewagen	3	9	6	4

Fourth round
1	(Australia) Newcombe	7	6	6	6
(South Africa) Moore	9	2	2	2

==== Section 2 ====
First round
8	(United States) Pasarell	6	6	6
(United States) Cullen	4	2	2
(Australia) Ruffels	6	7	7
(United States) Schloss	1	5	5
(United States) Brown	6	9	6	3	6
(United States) Neudecker	3	11	2	6	3
(South Africa) Hewitt	6	6	6
(United States) Stock	2	2	3
(United States) Goldman	6	6	6
(United States) Ringgold	3	2	2
(United States) Lutz	6	6	3	13	6
(United States) Weld	1	8	6	11	3
(United States) Conner	6	5	5	6	6
(United States) Cooper	2	7	7	3	1
(Australia) Keldie	7	6	6	6
(United States) Tidball	5	8	1	3

Second round
8	(United States) Pasarell	6	7	8
(Australia) Ruffels	1	5	6
(United States) Brown	2	3	1
(South Africa) Hewitt	6	6	6
(United States) Goldman	9	2	3
(United States) Lutz	11	6	6
(United States) Conner	6	6	3	2	5
(Australia) Keldie	3	0	6	6	7

Third round
8	(United States) Pasarell	6	6	3	4	10
(South Africa) Hewitt	3	4	6	6	12
(United States) Lutz	8	4	7	6
(Australia) Keldie	6	6	5	1

Fourth round
(South Africa) Hewitt	11	6	6
(United States) Lutz	9	4	4

==== Section 3 ====
First round
(United States) Scott	6	10	11
(United States) Yeomans	4	8	9
(United States) Gorman	6	2	6	2	8
(United Kingdom) Curtis	3	6	4	6	6
(United States) Marcin	8	6	6
(United States) Glass	6	2	1
(United States) Rose	6	10	7
(Mexico) García	2	8	5
(United States) Smith	11	6	6
(United States) Leach	9	1	4
(South Africa) Saul	3	6	9	7
(Argentina) Vázquez	6	3	7	5
(United States) Holmberg	6	6	6
(United States) Rombeau	3	4	1
(United States) Cranis	5	6	6	6
(United States) Mozur	7	4	4	2

Second round
(United States) Scott	7	6	6
(United States) Gorman	5	4	1
(United States) Marcin	6	2	3	3
(United States) Rose	4	6	6	6
(United States) Smith	6	6	3	6
(South Africa) Saul	3	0	6	3
(United States) Holmberg	6	6	6
(United States) Cranis	4	4	2

Third round
(United States) Scott	8	6	7	6
(United States) Rose	10	4	5	1
(United States) Smith	7	3	4
(United States) Holmberg	9	6	6

Fourth round
(United States) Scott	4	6	3	6	6
(United States) Holmberg	6	3	6	2	4

==== Section 4 ====
First round
6	(United Kingdom) Taylor	6	6	6
(United States) Neely	3	1	1
(United States) McManus	6	3	6	6
(United States) Montgomery	0	6	0	1
(Canada) Tutvin	8	6	4	6
(United States) Sprengelmeyer	6	1	6	4
(Australia) Davidson	6	6	6
(United States) Stockton	3	1	1
(Australia) Addison	7	11	6
(United States) Robertson	5	9	4
(United States) Dell	6	7	6
(Ecuador) Guzmán	4	5	1
(Mexico) Osuna	6	6	6
(Costa Rica) Obando	1	1	4
(Argentina) Álvarez	4	6	6	6
(United States) Leonard	6	2	2	3

Second round
6	(United Kingdom) Taylor	5	5	6	2
(United States) McManus	7	7	2	6
(Canada) Tutvin	3	4	7
(Australia) Davidson	6	6	9
(Australia) Addison	6	0	6	10
(United States) Dell	3	6	1	8
(Mexico) Osuna	6	6	6
(Argentina) Álvarez	3	3	4

Third round
(United States) McManus	0	1	4
(Australia) Davidson	6	6	6
(Australia) Addison	6	3	1
(Mexico) Osuna	8	6	6

Fourth round
(Australia) Davidson	8	8	0	4	6
(Mexico) Osuna	6	6	6	6	2

==== Section 5 ====
First round
(United States) Stockton	6	6	1	6
(United States) Mullan	1	2	6	1
(Venezuela) Hose	8	7	7	8
(Mexico) Subirats	6	5	5	6
(Puerto Rico) Carrero	11	6	6
(United States) Sprengelmeyer	9	3	1
(Brazil) Koch	6	7	6
(Canada) Fauquier	1	5	1
(United States) Froehling	7	6	7
(United States) Rubinoff	5	3	5
(United States) Knight	6	3	6	7
(United States) Foster	4	6	3	5
(Denmark) Leschly	6	6	6
(United States) Jackson	2	2	2
5	(South Africa) Drysdale	6	6	6
(United States) Newman	3	3	4

Second round
(United States) Stockton	4	7	6	9
(Venezuela) Hose	6	5	2	7
(Puerto Rico) Carrero	0	1	1
(Brazil) Koch	6	6	6
(United States) Froehling	6	3	6	7
(United States) Knight	4	6	2	5
(Denmark) Leschly	6	4	6	7
5	(South Africa) Drysdale	3	6	4	5

Third round
(United States) Stockton	3	2	1
(Brazil) Koch	6	6	6
(United States) Froehling	6	3	9	4
(Denmark) Leschly	4	6	11	6

Fourth round
(Brazil) Thomaz Koch	6	3	8	2	1
(Denmark) Leschly	4	6	6	6	6

==== Section 6 ====
First round
(United States) Seixas	6	7	6
(India) Singh	2	5	1
(Brazil) Barnes	6	6	6
(Australia) Brown	4	2	4
(South Africa) Van Lingen	6	1	4	6	6
(United States) Buchholz	1	6	6	2	2
(United States) Pasarell	10	5
(United States) Steele III	8	2	r
(Australia) Bowrey	6	7	6
(United States) Rubell	4	5	1
(United States) Riessen	6	6	6
(Canada) Carpenter	4	3	2
(United States) Buck	6	6	10
(Philippines) Villarete	3	3	8
4	(Socialist Federal Republic of Yugoslavia) Pilić	6	6	6
(United States) Roemer	1	2	4

Second round
(United States) Seixas	6	3	2	4
(Brazil) Barnes	2	6	6	6
(South Africa) Van Lingen	6	6	11
(United States) Pasarell	0	4	9
(Australia) Bowrey	2	6	6	6
(United States) Riessen	6	3	1	0
(United States) Buck	6	9	2	3
4	(Socialist Federal Republic of Yugoslavia) Pilić	3	11	6	6

Third round
(Brazil) Barnes	6	6	6
(South Africa) Van Lingen	1	4	2
(Australia) Bowrey	2	7	6	6
4	(Socialist Federal Republic of Yugoslavia) Pilić	6	5	2	4

Fourth round
(Brazil) Barnes	7	3	9	7
(Australia) Bowrey	5	6	7	5

==== Section 7 ====
First round
(United States) Fishbach	5	6	6	0	16
(Australia) Sharpe	7	3	4	6	14
(United States) Claflin	6	6	3	6
(United States) Palmer	4	4	6	4
(United Kingdom) Cox	6	11	6
(United States) McKinley	3	9	4
(United States) Sullivan	6	6	6
(United States) Tym	4	4	4
(United States) Fitzgibbon	13	8	6
(Denmark) Ulrich	11	6	1
(United States) Van Dillen	4	3	6	6	6
(United States) Taylor	6	6	1	3	2
(India) Mukerjea	8	6	6
(United States) Hoehn	6	3	1
7	(United States) Graebner	6	6	6
(United States) Stewart	3	3	3

Second round
(United States) Fishbach	4	11	2	4
(United States) Claflin	6	9	6	6
(United Kingdom) Cox	6	6	6
(United States) Sullivan	2	3	0
(United States) Fitzgibbon	6	11	6
(United States) Van Dillen	4	9	2
(India) Mukerjea	7	4	2
7	(United States) Graebner	9	6	6

Third round
(United States) Claflin	4	4	4
(United Kingdom) Cox	6	6	6
(United States) Fitzgibbon	2	3	9
7	(United States) Graebner	6	6	11

Fourth round
(United Kingdom) Cox	3	3	6	4
7	(United States) Graebner	6	6	2	6

==== Section 8 ====
First round
(United Kingdom) Bovett	6	6	6
(United States) Bleckinger	4	4	4
(United States) Robbins	11	9	6	6
(United States) Goeltz	13	7	4	4
(Mexico) Lara	6	6	7
(United States) Borowiak	1	3	5
(United States) Pressly	0	6	6	3	6
(United States) Oehrlein	6	4	0	6	3
(Mexico) Loyo-Mayo	4	7	6	6	8
(United States) Cheney	6	9	3	4	6
(United States) Barth	6	3	6	6
(United States) Brown	4	6	2	2
(United States) Osborne	6	6	6
(India) Singh	2	3	1
2	(Australia) Emerson	6	6	7
(France) Goven	4	4	5

Second round
(United Kingdom) Bovett	4	6	4	13
(United States) Robbins	6	3	6	15
(Mexico) Lara	6	6	6
(United States) Pressly	0	2	4
(Mexico) Loyo-Mayo	5	5	7	6	3
(United States) Barth	7	7	5	4	6
(United States) Osborne	9	8	2	6	4
2	(Australia) Emerson	7	10	6	2	6

Third round
(United States) Robbins	2	2	4
(Mexico) Lara	6	6	6
(United States) Barth	0	2	3
2	(Australia) Emerson	6	6	6

Fourth round
(Mexico) Lara	0	2	3
2	(Australia) Emerson	6	6	6

Preceded by 1967 Wimbledon Championships – Men's singles	Grand Slam men's singles	Succeeded by 1968 Australian Championships – Men's singles
