= Kathy Blake =

American tennis player

- Full name: Kathleen Blake
- Country (sports): United States
- Born: December 18, 1946 (age 78)
- Plays: Right-handed

Singles

Grand Slam singles results
- French Open: 3R (1967)
- Wimbledon: 3R (1967)
- US Open: 1R (1966, 1972)

Doubles

Grand Slam doubles results
- French Open: 2R (1967)
- Wimbledon: 3R (1972)
- US Open: QF (1964, 1965)

Grand Slam mixed doubles results
- Wimbledon: QF (1965)
- US Open: SF (1966)

Kathleen Blake (born December 18, 1946) is an American former professional tennis player.

Blake, a California native, won the USTA Under-16s national hardcourt championships in 1962.

Before the introduction of tiebreaks, she held the record for playing the longest match in women's professional tennis, with a 12-10, 6-8, 14-12 win over Elena Subirats at Piping Rock in 1966.

Blake's best national ranking was 11th.

Her best performances in grand slams came in doubles, including a mixed doubles quarter-final appearance at the 1965 Wimbledon Championships. She was a women's doubles quarter-finalist at the 1964 U.S. National Championships and in the same tournament two years later made the mixed doubles semi-finals with Butch Seewagen.

Married to tennis coach Wayne Bryan since 1973, Blake is the mother of identical twin doubles players the Bryan brothers (Bob and Mike).
