= Norma Baylon =

Argentine former tennis player

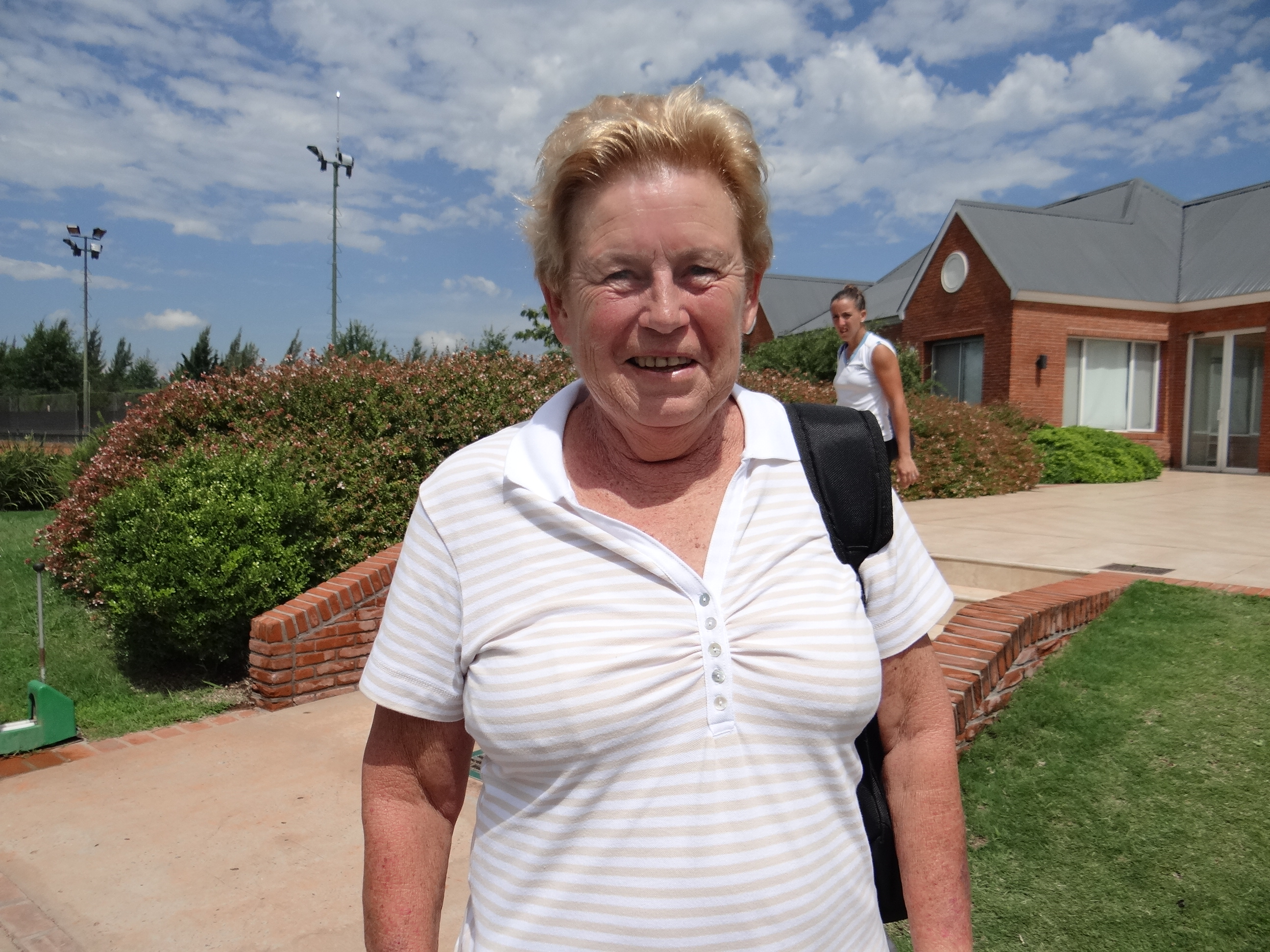
- Norma Baylon
- Country (sports): Argentina
- Born: 9 November 1942 (age 83) Buenos Aires, Argentina
- Turned pro: 1968 (1958 amateur)
- Retired: 1969

Singles
- Career record: 193-72 (72.8%)
- Career titles: 14
- Highest ranking: No. 7 (1966)

Grand Slam singles results
- Australian Open: 3R (1965)
- French Open: QF (1965)
- Wimbledon: QF (1964)
- US Open: QF (1965, 1966)

Grand Slam doubles results
- Australian Open: SF (1965)
- French Open: F (1964)
- Wimbledon: 2R (1963, 1964, 1966)

Grand Slam mixed doubles results
- Australian Open: 2R (1965)
- French Open: SF (1964)
- Wimbledon: 3R (1963, 1964, 1965)
- US Open: 2R (1964)

Norma Baylon (born 9 November 1942) is an Argentine former World No 7 ranked tennis player in singles in 1966. She was active from 1958 to 1969 and contested 31 career singles finals, and won 14 titles.

== Tennis career ==
Baylon started playing tennis at age five.

She played her first senior event in November 1958 at the Argentina International Championships where she reached the third round and lost to the American player Karol Fageros. She reached her first tour final in April 1961 at the River Plate Championships where she lost to compatriot Viola Livetti.

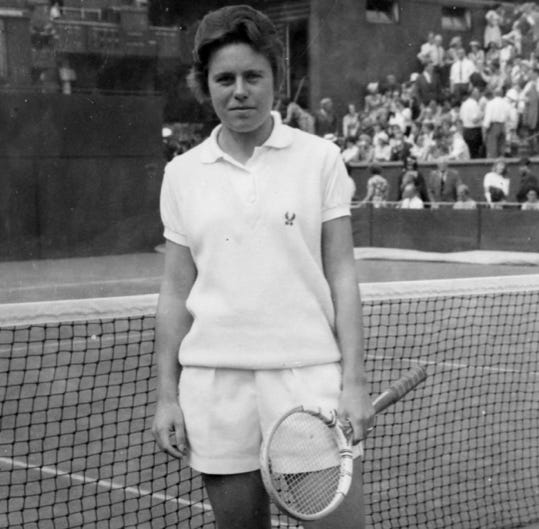
Baylon in the 1960s

In 1962, she won her first title at the South American Championships in Buenos Aires against the Czech player Věra Suková.

In 1964, Baylon and her teammate Helga Schultze reached the final of the doubles event at the 1964 French Championships, losing in straight sets to Margaret Smith and Lesley Turner.

Baylon's best result at a Grand Slam singles event was reaching the quarterfinals on four occasions. At the 1964 Wimbledon Championships, she reached her first quarterfinals after defeating seventh-seeded Jan Lehane in the third round, but she retired against first-seeded Margaret Smith. At the 1965 French Championships, she was seeded ninth and lost in the quarterfinals to Smith in two sets. Later that year at the U.S. National Championships, Baylon was seeded eighth, and she was defeated in the quarterfinals by third-seeded Nancy Richey. At the 1966 U.S. National Championships, Baylon was seeded sixth and again reached the quarterfinals in which she won just a single game against second-seeded and eventual champion Maria Bueno.

She twice won the Connaught Hard Court Championships in 1963 and 1964 both times against former Wimbledon champion Christine Truman.

In June 1965, she won the singles title at the Swiss International Championships after her final against Edda Buding was cancelled at 5-all in the final set due to rain.

In September 1967, she won her fourteenth and final singles title at the Lima International against Peruvian player Virginia Caceres.

From 1964 to 1966, she played in four ties for the Argentine Fed Cup team, winning three matches and losing four.

In 1962, she won the Olimpia Award, an Argentine sports award, becoming the first female to receive the recognition.

== Personal life ==
In 1967, she married Peruvian Bartolomé Puiggros and subsequently lived in Peru for 25 years. The couple had three sons.

== Grand Slam finals ==
=== Doubles (1 runner-up) ===
Result	Year	Championship	Surface	Partner	Opponents	Score
Loss	1964	French Championships	Clay	(West Germany) Helga Schultze	(Australia) Margaret Smith (Australia) Lesley Turner	3–6, 1–6
