= 1965 U.S. National Championships – Men's singles =

Men's singles
- 1965 U.S. National Championships

Final
- Champion: (Spain) Manuel Santana
- Runner-up: (South Africa) Cliff Drysdale
- Score: 6–2, 7–9, 7–5, 6–1

Details
- Draw: 128
- Seeds: 8

Events
Singles	men	women
Doubles	men	women
- U.S. National Championships

Manuel Santana defeated Cliff Drysdale 6–2, 7–9, 7–5, 6–1 in the final to win the men's singles tennis title at the 1965 U.S. National Championships.

== Seeds ==
The seeded players are listed below. Manuel Santana is the champion; others show the round in which they were eliminated.

1. (Australia) Roy Emerson (quarterfinals)
2. (Australia) Fred Stolle (second round)
3. (United States) Dennis Ralston (quarterfinals)
4. (Spain) Manuel Santana (champion)
5. (United States) Arthur Ashe (semifinals)
6. (Mexico) Rafael Osuna (semifinals)
7. (United States) Chuck McKinley (fourth round)
8. (South Africa) Cliff Drysdale (finalist)

== Draw ==
=== Key ===
- Q = Qualifier
- WC = Wild card
- LL = Lucky loser
- r = Retired

=== Final eight ===
Quarterfinals
1	(Australia) Roy Emerson	11	4	12	2
5	(United States) Arthur Ashe	13	6	10	6
4	(Spain) Manuel Santana	6	9	6
(Mexico) Tony Palafox	3	7	1
8	(South Africa) Cliff Drysdale	2	3	7	6	8
3	(United States) Dennis Ralston	6	6	5	3	6
6	(Mexico) Rafael Osuna	1	6	6	7
(United States) Charlie Pasarell	6	3	3	5

Semifinals
5	(United States) Arthur Ashe	6	4	2	4
4	(Spain) Manuel Santana	2	6	6	6
8	(South Africa) Cliff Drysdale	6	4	6	6
6	(Mexico) Rafael Osuna	3	6	4	1

Final
4	(Spain) Manuel Santana	6	7	7	6
8	(South Africa) Cliff Drysdale	2	9	5	1

=== Earlier rounds ===
==== Section 1 ====
First round
1	(Australia) Emerson	6	6	8
(Ecuador) Zuleta	1	3	6
(United States) Roemer	10	5	6	6
(United States) Foster	8	7	4	2
(United States) Richey	6	6	6
(Chile) Pabst	4	0	4
(United States) Susman	2	6	6	6
(South Africa) Moore	6	4	2	4
(United States) Hoffman Jr	4	6	6	6
(South Africa) Summers	6	4	0	3
(France) Barthès	6	6	7
(Mexico) Zarazua	3	2	5
(United States) Buck	7	6	8
(Philippines) Yang	5	2	6
(United States) Kantrow	7	7	3	6
(United States) Sorlien	5	5	6	1

Second round
1	(Australia) Emerson	6	6	6
(United States) Roemer	3	2	4
(United States) Richey	6	8	3	6
(United States) Susman	3	6	6	3
(United States) Hoffman Jr	3	3	4
(France) Barthès	6	6	6
(United States) Buck	3	6	4	9
(United States) Kantrow	6	4	6	11

Third round
1	(Australia) Emerson	6	6	6
(United States) Richey	3	3	0
(France) Barthès	6	6	6
(United States) Kantrow	3	2	3

Fourth round
1	(Australia) Emerson	6	13	6
(France) Barthès	4	11	4

==== Section 2 ====
First round
5	(United States) Ashe	6	6	9
(United States) Scott	3	4	7
(United States) Rose	6	6	6
(United States) Roesch	3	4	4
(United States) Lambert	6	6	6
(United States) Williams	0	1	3
(Peru) Ponte	3	6	6	6
(United States) Rombeau	6	4	3	2
(United States) Tutvin	6	3	9	9	6
(Socialist Federal Republic of Yugoslavia) Pilić	4	6	11	7	3
(United States) Edlefsen	9	6	6
(India) Singh	7	4	3
(United Kingdom) Taylor	6	6	6
(United States) Adelsberg	1	1	4
(Brazil) Koch	6	6	6
(United States) Fentress	1	1	1

Second round
5	(United States) Ashe	6	6	6
(United States) Rose	0	3	2
(United States) Lambert	6	6	6
(Peru) Ponte	1	3	2
(United States) Tutvin	2	3	5
(United States) Edlefsen	6	6	7
(United Kingdom) Taylor	2	3	3
(Brazil) Koch	6	6	6

Third round
5	(United States) Ashe	6	6	6
(United States) Lambert	1	3	4
(United States) Edlefsen	4	7	5
(Brazil) Koch	6	9	7

Fourth round
5	(United States) Ashe	12	13	10
(Brazil) Thomaz Koch	10	11	8

==== Section 3 ====
First round
4	(Spain) Santana	6	6	5	6
(Canada) Fontana	3	1	7	1
(Mexico) Lara	6	6	6
(United States) Charity	3	3	2
(United States) Osborne	6	6	6
(United States) Conner	4	4	4
(United States) Siska
(United States) Rubinoff	w/o
(Costa Rica) Obando	6	6	6
(Canada) Brown	1	1	2
(United States) Dell	8	6	6	8
(New Zealand) Gerrard	6	8	3	6
(United States) Fox	6	6	6
(Nigeria) Awopegba	1	4	0
(United States) Riessen	6	6	6
(United States) Tym	2	2	1

Second round
4	(Spain) Santana	6	8	6
(Mexico) Lara	4	6	1
(United States) Osborne	6	6	1	10
(United States) Siska	3	2	6	8
(Costa Rica) Obando	2	3	2
(United States) Dell	6	6	6
(United States) Fox	4	4	7
(United States) Riessen	6	6	9

Third round
4	(Spain) Santana	6	6	6
(United States) Osborne	4	4	3
(United States) Dell	2	2	4
(United States) Riessen	6	6	6

Fourth round
4	(Spain) Santana	10	6	6
(United States) Riessen	8	1	3

==== Section 4 ====
First round
7	(United States) McKinley	6	6	6
(United States) Wilkinson	2	2	0
(United States) Mangan	6	7	6
(France) Barclay	4	5	1
(United States) Graebner	6	6	6
(Jamaica) Russell	3	4	4
(United States) Reese	6	6	6
(United States) Simpson	2	3	3
(United States) Galinato
(Japan) Fujii	w/o
(Mexico) Palafox	6	6	6
(United States) Schloss	4	3	3
(United States) Bond	6	9	6
(United States) Barker	2	7	2
(United States) Cromwell	6	4	6	2	8
(United States) Buchholz	3	6	4	6	6

Second round
7	(United States) McKinley	6	6	6
(United States) Mangan	2	1	1
(United States) Graebner	6	6	7
(United States) Reese	3	2	5
(United States) Galinato	0	2	2
(Mexico) Palafox	6	6	6
(United States) Bond	8	6	3	4
(United States) Cromwell	10	4	6	6

Third round
7	(United States) McKinley	9	6	6	6
(United States) Graebner	11	3	3	0
(Mexico) Palafox	7	3	6	6
(United States) Cromwell	5	6	1	3

Fourth round
7	(United States) McKinley	7	4	6
(Mexico) Palafox	9	6	8

==== Section 5 ====
First round
(Mexico) Loyo-Mayo	6	6	6
(United States) Senkowski	2	4	2
(United States) Harris	6	3	12	6
(United States) Waltz	4	6	10	1
(United States) Seixas	6	6	6
(United States) Hoehn	3	3	1
(Ecuador) Guzmán	6	6	6
(New Zealand) Crookenden	3	3	4
(United States) Sullivan	6	7	6
(United States) Cullen	4	5	4
(United States) Green	6	6	6
(United States) Beste	1	3	2
(United States) Grant	6	10	3	6
(United States) Franks	3	8	6	2
8	(South Africa) Drysdale	6	6	6
(United States) Moody	2	1	2

Second round
(Mexico) Loyo-Mayo	6	6	6
(United States) Harris	3	2	2
(United States) Seixas	6	6	6
(Ecuador) Guzmán	2	3	3
(United States) Sullivan	8	10	3	6
(United States) Green	6	8	6	2
(United States) Grant	1	3	12
8	(South Africa) Drysdale	6	6	14

Third round
(Mexico) Loyo-Mayo	4	3	6
(United States) Seixas	6	6	8
(United States) Sullivan	3	3	1
8	(South Africa) Drysdale	6	6	6

Fourth round
(United States) Seixas	4	4	4
8	(South Africa) Drysdale	6	6	6

==== Section 6 ====
First round
(United States) Holmberg	6	6	6
(United States) Higgins	1	2	2
(United States) Avoyer	1	3	7	6	7
(United States) Goldman	6	6	5	4	5
(United States) Smith	7	6	6
(United States) Anderson	5	4	2
(Italy) Pietrangeli	4	2	6	6	6
(United Kingdom) Cox	6	6	3	2	3
(United States) Froehling	7	6	6
(United States) Brown	5	3	3
(United States) Pickens	2	6	8	3	6
(United States) Harrison	6	3	6	6	3
(United States) Steele III	6	6	6
(United States) Sweeney	2	1	3
3	(United States) Ralston	6	6	6
(United States) Hobson	0	3	2

Second round
(United States) Holmberg	6	6	6
(United States) Avoyer	0	2	0
(United States) Smith	2	2	1
(Italy) Pietrangeli	6	6	6
(United States) Froehling	6	6	5	3	6
(United States) Pickens	3	0	7	6	3
(United States) Steele III	1	6	1	0
3	(United States) Ralston	6	3	6	6

Third round
(United States) Holmberg	6	6	7
(Italy) Pietrangeli	3	3	5
(United States) Froehling	5	6	3	3
3	(United States) Ralston	7	4	6	6

Fourth round
(United States) Holmberg	6	3	1	8	9
3	(United States) Ralston	3	6	6	6	11

==== Section 7 ====
First round
(Mexico) García	6	5	12	6
(Chile) Fillol	4	7	10	4
(Brazil) Barnes	8	8	6	8
(United States) Lutz	6	10	3	6
(Canada) Bedard	6	6	6
(United States) Sack	2	3	0
(United States) McManus	6	6	6
(United States) La Mothe	3	2	2
(United States) Fitzgibbon	11	6	6
(United States) Power	9	3	2
(United States) Lieberman
(Socialist Federal Republic of Yugoslavia) Jovanović	w/o
(United States) Howe	6	6	6	6
(United States) Pasarell	2	8	2	3
6	(Mexico) Osuna	6	6	7
(Australia) Higgins	3	3	5

Second round
(Mexico) García	3	0	2
(Brazil) Barnes	6	6	6
(Canada) Bedard	6	2	3	6	2
(United States) McManus	1	6	6	4	6
(United States) Fitzgibbon	6	6	10
(United States) Lieberman	2	1	8
(United States) Howe	4	3	3
6	(Mexico) Osuna	6	6	6

Third round
(Brazil) Barnes	4	6	6	5	12
(United States) McManus	6	4	3	7	10
(United States) Fitzgibbon	9	6	2	10
6	(Mexico) Osuna	7	8	6	12

Fourth round
(Brazil) Barnes	0	4	4
6	(Mexico) Osuna	6	6	6

==== Section 8 ====
First round
(United States) Glass	7	6	6
(United States) Quinn	5	1	4
(United States) Powless	6	0	6	2	6
(United States) Jackson	3	6	1	6	2
(Canada) Carpenter	6	6	6
(United States) Cantin	4	2	4
(United States) Beck	3	6	6	9
(Philippines) Hernandez	6	3	3	7
(United States) Jennings	6	6	6
(Switzerland) Berli	3	1	2
(Puerto Rico) Carrero	3	4	6	7	6
(United States) Tidball	6	6	4	5	3
(United States) Pasarell	6	6	6
(United States) Harris	2	4	3
2	(Australia) Stolle	9	6	7
(United States) Newman	7	2	5

Second round
(United States) Glass	9	4	5	7
(United States) Powless	7	6	7	9
(Canada) Carpenter	6	6	6
(United States) Beck	2	3	0
(United States) Jennings	8	6	6
(Puerto Rico) Carrero	6	4	4
(United States) Pasarell	6	6	6
2	(Australia) Stolle	3	4	2

Third round
(United States) Powless	6	4	17	3	9
(Canada) Carpenter	3	6	15	6	11
(United States) Jennings	2	3	2
(United States) Pasarell	6	6	6

Fourth round
(Canada) Carpenter	3	3	3
(United States) Pasarell	6	6	6

Preceded by 1965 Wimbledon Championships – Men's singles	Grand Slam men's singles	Succeeded by 1966 Australian Championships – Men's singles
