= Junior Orange Bowl (tennis) =

Youth tennis tournament

The Junior Orange Bowl International Tennis Championships is a youth tennis tournament, held in Coral Gables, Florida, for Boys & Girls in the "14 and under" and "12 and under" divisions. In 2024 the tournament will celebrate its 63rd anniversary. Robert Gomez is the tournament director.

== History ==
The global Junior Orange Bowl International Tennis Championships has as competitors the top-ranked boys and girls 12-and-under and 14-and-under junior players, from over 76 countries.

The Orange Bowl tournament was founded in 1947. The "14 and under" and "12 and under" tournaments began in 1962. Past champions include legends, Jimmy Connors, Chris Evert, Juan Martin del Potro, Steffi Graf, Andy Murray, Monica Seles, Tommy Haas, Coco Gauff and Mary Jo Fernandez. Winners have come from over 20 nations.

== Past champions ==
Year	Boys		Girls	
Year	14 & under^{1}	12 & under	14 & under^{1}	12 & under
1948	(United States) Jerry Moss	Not held	Not held	Not held
1949	(United States) Jerry Moss	Not held	Not held	Not held
1950	(United States) Mike Green	Not held	Not held	Not held
1951	(United States) Donald Dell	Not held	(Mexico) Rosie Reyes	Not held
1952	(United States) Butch Buchholz	Not held	(United States) Phyllis Saganski	Not held
1953	(United States) Butch Buchholz	Not held	(United States) Donna Floyd	Not held
1954	(United States) Ray Senkowski	Not held	(United States) Virginia Hess	Not held
1955	(United States) Frank Froehling III	Not held	(United States) Virginia Hess	Not held
1956	(United States) Curtis Myers	Not held	(United States) Roberta Alison	Not held
1957	(Puerto Rico) Charlie Pasarell	Not held	(United States) Peachy Kellmeyer	Not held
1958	(Costa Rica) Nicholas Kalo	Not held	(United States) Mary Arfaras	Not held
1959	(United States) George Seewagen	Not held	(United States) Vickie Holmes	Not held
1960	(Mexico) Marcelo Lara	Not held	(United States) Peaches Bartkowicz	Not held
1961	(Puerto Rico) Alberto Carrero	Not held	(United States) Peaches Bartkowicz	Not held
1962	(Puerto Rico) Stanley Pasarell	(United States) Mac Claflin	(Mexico) Susanna Selinger	(United States) Ann Roberts
1963	(United States) Richard Stockton	(United States) Dick Stockton	(United States) Carol Hunter	(United States) Marjory Gengler
1964	(United States) Richard Stockton	(United States) Jimmy Connors	(United States) Connie Capozzi	(United States) Nancy Ornstein
1965	(United States) Eddie Dibbs	(United States) Jeff Miller	(United States) Emily Fisher	(United States) Karin Benson
1966	(United States) Sandy Mayer	(Puerto Rico) Freddy de Jesús	(United States) Karin Benson	(United States) Plums Bartkowicz
1967	(Mexico) Emilio Montaño	(United States) Eugene Mayer	(United States) Chris Evert	(United States) Laurie Tenney
1968	(United States) John Whitlinger	(United States) Billy Martin	(United States) Laurie Fleming	(United States) Jeanne Evert
1969	(United States) Billy Martin	(United States) Howard Schoenfield	(Brazil) Andréa Menezes	(United States) Lynn Epstein
1970	(Chile) Hans Gildemeister	(United States) Eddie Reese	(United States) Jeanne Evert	(United States) Sheila McInerney
1971	(United States) Walter Lentz	(United States) Van Winitsky	(United States) Lynn Epstein	(United States) Sherry Acker
1972	(United States) Van Winitsky	(United States) John Evert	(United States) Zenda Liess	(United States) Anne White
1973	(United States) Blaine Willenborg	(United States) Mark Mees	(United States) Jennifer Balent	(United States) Elise Burgin
1974	(United States) Billy Nealon	(Canada) Alan Racko	(United States) Laura Starr	(United States) Shelley Solomon
1975	(United States) Bruce Brescia	(United States) Jim Pugh	(United States) Elise Burgin	(United States) Andrea Jaeger
1976	(United States) Bruce Pompan	(United States) Jimmy Brown	(United States) Shelley Solomon	(United States) Lori Kosten
1977	(Argentina) Roberto Argüello	(United States) Robbie Weiss	(Mexico) Susana Rojas	(United States) Karen Seguso
1978	(Brazil) Carlos Chabalgoity	(United States) Aaron Krickstein	(United States) Lori Kosten	(United States) Kathy Rinaldi
1979	(Chile) José Fernández	(Socialist Federal Republic of Yugoslavia) Bruno Orešar	(Venezuela) Lilian Drescher	(United States) Claire Evert
1980	(France) Olivier Cayla	(United States) Al Parker	(Hungary) Andrea Temesvári	(United States) Kerri Rieter
1981	(Socialist Federal Republic of Yugoslavia) Bruno Orešar	(Argentina) Agustín Garizzio	(Bulgaria) Manuela Maleeva	(Germany) Steffi Graf
1982	(Sweden) Kent Carlsson	(United States) David Kass	(United States) Stephanie Rehe	(United States) Mary Joe Fernández
1983	(Mexico) Eduardo Vélez	(United States) Fritz Bissell	(United States) Mary Joe Fernández	(United States) Diane McKeon
1984	(Venezuela) Nicolás Pereira	(Sweden) Johan Alvén	(United States) Caryn Moss	(United States) Luanne Spadea
1985	(Sweden) Nicklas Kulti	(United States) Tommy Ho	(United States) Luanne Spadea	(Socialist Federal Republic of Yugoslavia) Monica Seles
1986	(United States) Frank Salazar	(United States) Jason Appel	(United States) Laxmi Poruri	(United States) Jennifer Capriati
1987	(United States) Tommy Ho	(United States) Jimmy Jackson	(Chinese Taipei) Wang Shi-ting	(Bulgaria) Magdalena Maleeva
1988	(United States) Vince Spadea	(United States) B.J. Stearns	(United States) Nicole Hummel	(United States) Chanda Rubin
1989	(Czech Republic) Filip Kascak	Not held	(Germany) Marketa Kochta	Not held
1990	(Sweden) Magnus Norman	Not held	(Germany) Heike Rusch	Not held
1991	(United Kingdom) Jamie Delgado	Not held	(Italy) Francesca Bentivoglio	Not held
1992	(Germany) Tommy Haas	Not held	(France) Amélie Castéra	Not held
1993	(France) Jean-René Lisnard	Not held	(France) Karolina Jagieniak	Not held
1994	(Russia) Artem Derepasko	Not held	(United States) Jessica Lehnhoff	Not held
1995	(Belgium) Olivier Rochus	Not held	(Slovenia) Katarina Srebotnik	Not held
1996	(France) Paul-Henri Mathieu	Not held	(Belgium) Justine Henin	Not held
1997	(Switzerland) Stéphane Bohli	Not held	(Croatia) Jelena Pandžić	Not held
1998	(Federal Republic of Yugoslavia) Janko Tipsarević	(South Korea) Choi Dong-whee	(Mexico) Melissa Torres	(Switzerland) Romina Oprandi
1999	(Chinese Taipei) Wang Yeu-tzuoo	(United Kingdom) Andy Murray	(Croatia) Matea Mezak	(France) Tatiana Golovin
2000	(Russia) Artem Sitak	(Federal Republic of Yugoslavia) Dejan Katić	(United States) Nicole Pitts	(Germany) Laura Siegemund
2001	(United States) Clancy Shields	(South Korea) Kim Cheong-eui	(Israel) Shahar Pe'er	(Bulgaria) Sesil Karatantcheva
2002	(Argentina) Juan Martín del Potro	(Australia) Andrew Thomas	(Belarus) Olga Govortsova	(Canada) Sharon Fichman
2003	(Venezuela) Roberto Maytín	(Georgia (country)) Lazare Kukhalashvila	(Romania) Sorana Cîrstea	(United States) Mallory Burdette
2004	(Lithuania) Ričardas Berankis	(Australia) Bernard Tomic	(Austria) Tamira Paszek	(Russia) Valeria Solovyeva
2005	(United States) Rhyne Williams	(United States) Christian Harrison	(Russia) Viktoria Kamenskaya	(Belarus) Anna Orlik
2006	(Australia) Bernard Tomic	(United States) Reo Asami	(Belarus) Anna Orlik	(United Kingdom) Jessica Ren
2007	(United Kingdom) George Morgan	(United States) Joseph Di Giulio	(Lithuania) Iveta Dapkutė	(United States) Madison Keys
2008	(United States) John Richmond	(South Korea) Chung Hyeon	(South Korea) Lee So-ra	(Netherlands) Indy de Vroome
2009	(Vietnam) Nguyễn Hoàng Thiên	(South Korea) Hong Seong-chan	(United States) Yuki Kristina Chiang	(Canada) Françoise Abanda
2010	(United Kingdom) Joshua Sapwell	(United States) Michael Mmoh	(United States) Brooke Austin	(United States) Nicole Frenkel
2011	(South Korea) Hong Seong-chan	(Russia) Artem Dubrivnyy	(United States) Katerina Stewart	(United States) Claire Liu
2012	(United States) Michael Mmoh	(Israel) Yshai Oliel	(United Kingdom) Maia Lumsden	(United States) Abigail Desiatnikov
2013	(Argentina) Axel Geller	(Argentina) Juan Manuel Cerúndolo	(United States) Claire Liu	(United States) Hurricane Tyra Black
2014	(Israel) Yshai Oliel	(Croatia) Borna Devald	(Russia) Anastasia Potapova	(United States) Whitney Osuigwe
2015	(Argentina) Thiago Agustín Tirante	(China) Wang Xiaofei	(Ukraine) Marta Kostyuk	(Ukraine) Daria Lopatetska
2016	(China) Bu Yunchaokete	(United States) Victor Lilov	(United States) Alexa Noel	(United States) Coco Gauff
2017	(Japan) Shintaro Mochizuki	(Japan) Lennon Roark Jones	(United States) Elvina Kalieva	(Czech Republic) Linda Fruhvirtova
2018	(Hong Kong) Coleman Wong	(United States) Rudy Quan	(Turkey) Melisa Ercan	(United States) Clervie Ngounoue
2019	(United States) Nishesh Basavareddy	(United Kingdom) Benjamin Gusic-Wan	(United States) Stephanie Yakoff	(Russia) Mirra Andreeva
2020	Not held			
2021	(Colombia) Alejandro Arcila	(Slovenia) Svit Suljic	(United States) Iva Jovic	(Moldova) Lia Belibova
2022	(Bulgaria) Ivan Ivanov	(South Korea) Dongjae Kim	(Latvia) Adelina Lachinova	(Russia) Kristina Liutova
2023	(United States) Andrew Johnson	(South Korea) Jang Junseo	(Czech Republic) Jana Kovackova	(Israel) Daniel Baranes
2024	(China) Qi Hongjin	(Australia) Novak Palombo	(Japan) Sakino Miyazawa	(United States) Nikol Davletshina
2025	(United States) Tristan Ascenzo	(China) Rui He	(Japan) Ayaka Iwasa	(China) Fangqiao Zou

^{1}Prior to 1962 the event was a 13 & under tournament. In 1962 it became a 14 & under championship.

== See also ==
- Dunlop Orange Bowl
- Junior Orange Bowl
