= Cliff Drysdale =

South African tennis player

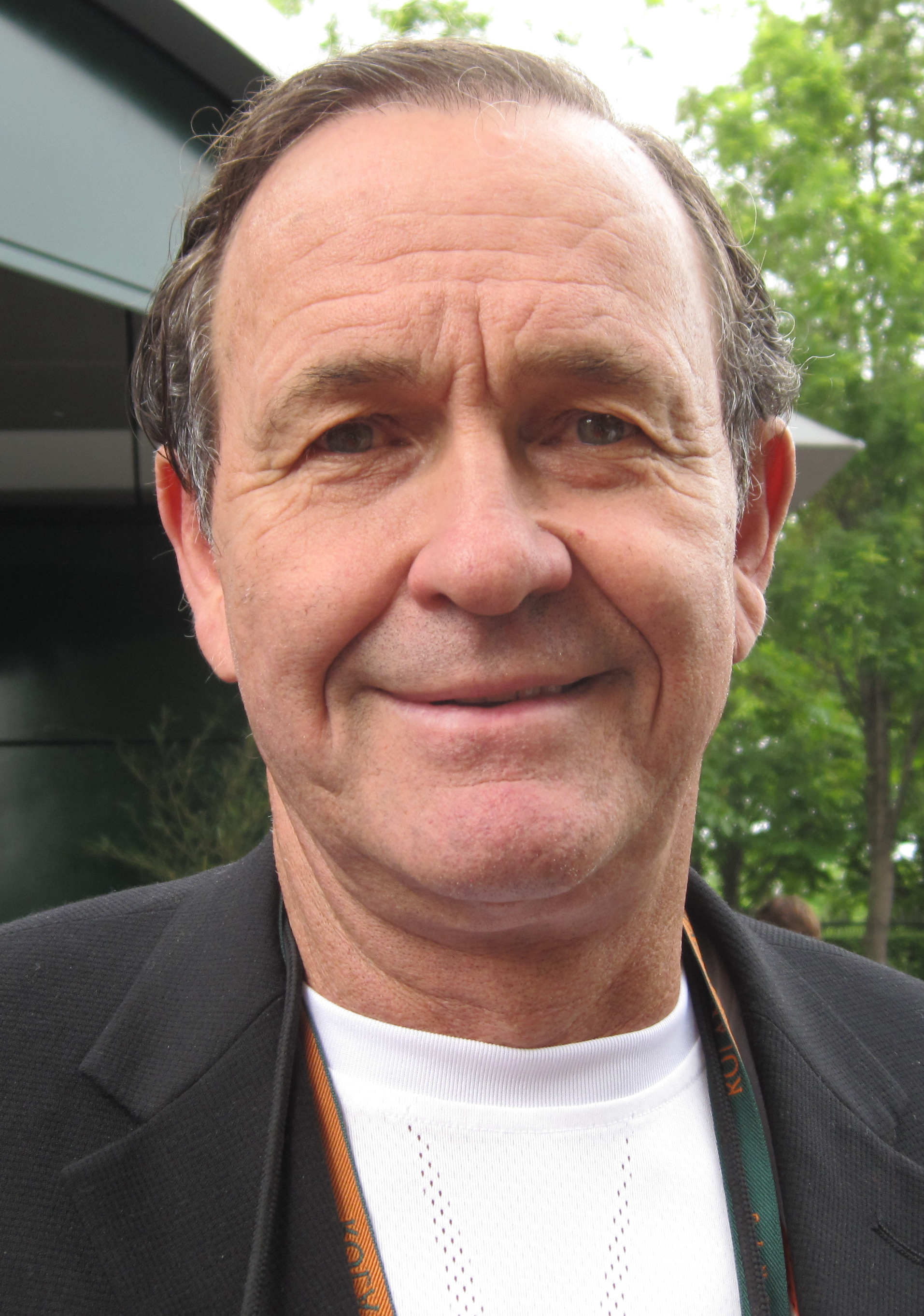
- Drysdale in 2009
- Full name: Eric Clifford Drysdale
- Country (sports): South Africa
- Residence: Austin, Texas, United States
- Born: 26 May 1941 (age 85) Nelspruit, South Africa
- Height: 1.89 m (6 ft 2 1/2 in)
- Turned pro: 1968 (amateur from 1962)
- Retired: 1980
- Plays: Right-handed (two-handed backhand)
- Int. Tennis HoF: 2013 (member page)
- Official website: www.cliffdrysdale.com

Singles
- Career record: 685–345 (66.5%) in pre Open-Era & Open Era
- Career titles: 23
- Highest ranking: No. 4 (1965, Lance Tingay)

Grand Slam singles results
- Australian Open: QF (1971)
- French Open: SF (1965, 1966)
- Wimbledon: SF (1965, 1966)
- US Open: F (1965)

Other tournaments
- WCT Finals: QF (1971, 1972, 1977)

Doubles
- Career record: 189–160 (54.15%)
- Career titles: 6

Grand Slam doubles results
- Australian Open: 1R (1971)
- French Open: 3R (1973)
- Wimbledon: SF (1974, 1977)
- US Open: W (1972)

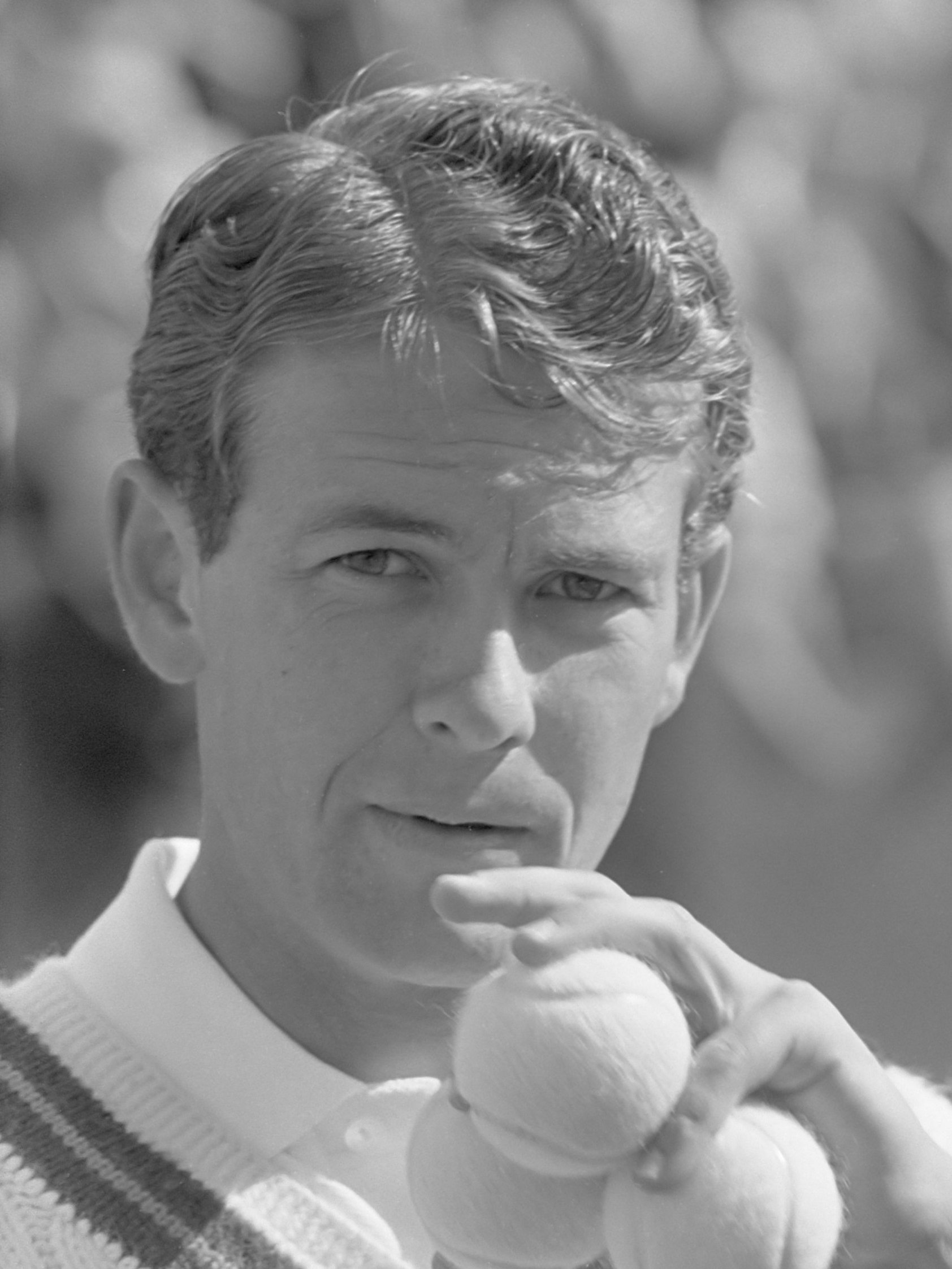
Drysdale at the 1966 Davis Cup in the Netherlands

Eric Clifford Drysdale (born 26 May 1941) is a South African former tennis player. After a career as a highly ranked professional player in the 1960s and early 1970s, he became a tennis commentator.

== Life and career ==
Born Eric Clifford 'Cliff' Drysdale in Nelspruit (today known as Mbombela, Mpumalanga Province, South Africa) on May 26, 1941 and completed his high school at Grey High School, Port Elizabeth.

Drysdale won the singles title at the Dutch Open in 1963 and 1964. In 1965, he reached the singles final of the 1965 U. S. Championships and he won the singles title at the German Championships. He defeated Rod Laver in the fourth round of the first US Open in 1968. During his Open-era career, Drysdale captured five singles titles and six doubles titles, including the 1972 US Open doubles crown with Roger Taylor. He was a pioneer of the two-handed backhand shot, which he used to great effect during his playing career.

Drysdale was included among the Handsome Eight, a group of players signed by Lamar Hunt in 1968 for the newly formed professional World Championship Tennis group. He became president of the Association of Tennis Professionals (ATP), an association that Drysdale had formed in 1972 with Jack Kramer and Donald Dell.

Following retirement, Drysdale became a naturalized American citizen. He was a tennis commentator for ESPN from the network's inception in 1979. Following the retirement of Bob Ley in 2019, Drysdale became the longest serving commentator at ESPN. He commentated on his last match for ESPN at the US Open on September 4, 2025, calling the semi-final match between Aryna Sabalenka and Jessica Pegula. ESPN did an extensive tribute to his career that aired during his last match. In 1998, the USTA awarded Drysdale the William M. Johnston award for his contribution to men's tennis. In 2013, he was elected into the International Tennis Hall of Fame.

== Grand Slam finals ==
=== Singles: (1 runner-up) ===
| Result | Year | Championship | Surface | Opponent | Score |
|---|---|---|---|---|---|
| Loss | 1965 | U.S. Championships | Grass | (Spain) Manuel Santana | 2–6, 9–7, 5–7, 1–6 |

=== Doubles: (1 title) ===
| Result | Year | Championship | Surface | Partner | Opponents | Score |
|---|---|---|---|---|---|---|
| Win | 1972 | US Open | Grass | (United Kingdom) Roger Taylor | (Australia) Owen Davidson (Australia) John Newcombe | 6–4, 7–6^{(7–3)}, 6–3 |

== Open Era finals ==
=== Singles: 18 (5 titles, 13 runner-ups) ===
| Result | W-L | Date | Tournament | Surface | Opponent | Score |
|---|---|---|---|---|---|---|
| Win | 1–0 | Jul 1968 | Gstaad, Switzerland | Clay | (Netherlands) Tom Okker | 6–3, 6–3, 6–0 |
| Loss | 1–1 | Aug 1968 | Hamburg, Germany | Clay | (Australia) John Newcombe | 3–6, 2–6, 4–6 |
| Loss | 1–2 | May 1969 | Berlin, Germany | Clay | (South Africa) Ray Moore | 6–1, 1–6, 5–7, 8–6, 5–7 |
| Loss | 1–3 | Apr 1970 | Durban, South Africa | Hard | (South Africa) Bob Hewitt | 4–6, 6–3, 4–6, 3–6 |
| Win | 2–3 | Apr 1971 | Miami WCT, US | Hard | (Australia) Rod Laver | 6–2, 6–4, 3–6, 6–4 |
| Loss | 2–4 | Apr 1971 | Denver, US | Carpet (i) | (Australia) Ken Rosewall | 2–6, 2–6 |
| Win | 3–4 | May 1971 | Brussels, Belgium | Clay | (Romania) Ilie Năstase | 6–0, 6–1, 7–5 |
| Loss | 3–5 | Jul 1971 | Louisville WCT, US | Clay | (Netherlands) Tom Okker | 6–3, 4–6, 1–6 |
| Loss | 3–6 | Aug 1971 | Boston WCT, US | Hard | (Australia) Ken Rosewall | 4–6, 3–6, 0–6 |
| Loss | 3–7 | Feb 1972 | Richmond WCT, US | Carpet | (Australia) Rod Laver | 6–2, 3–6, 5–7, 3–6 |
| Loss | 3–8 | Mar 1972 | Miami WCT, US | Hard | (Australia) Ken Rosewall | 6–3, 2–6, 4–6 |
| Loss | 3–9 | May 1972 | Las Vegas, US | Hard | (Australia) John Newcombe | 3–6, 4–6 |
| Loss | 3–10 | Oct 1972 | Alamo WCT, US | Hard | (Australia) John Newcombe | 1–6, 1–6, 5–7 |
| Win | 4–10 | Mar 1974 | Miami WCT | Hard | (United States) Tom Gorman | 6–4, 7–5 |
| Loss | 4–11 | Apr 1975 | Houston WCT, US | Clay | (Australia) Ken Rosewall | 3–6, 6–3, 1–6 |
| Loss | 4–12 | Feb 1976 | Barcelona, Spain | Clay | (United States) Eddie Dibbs | 1–6, 1–6 |
| Loss | 4–13 | Apr 1976 | Johannesburg, South Africa | Hard | (New Zealand) Onny Parun | 6–7, 3–6 |
| Win | 5–13 | Jan 1978 | Baltimore, US | Carpet (i) | (United States) Tom Gorman | 7–5, 6–3 |

=== Doubles: 22 (7 titles / 15 runner-ups) ===
| Result | W-L | Date | Tournament | Surface | Partner | Opponents | Score |
|---|---|---|---|---|---|---|---|
| Loss | 0–1 | Sep 1968 | Los Angeles, US | Hard | (United Kingdom) Roger Taylor | (Australia) Ken Rosewall (Australia) Fred Stolle | 5–7, 1–6 |
| Win | 1–1 | Apr 1969 | Durban, South Africa | Hard | (South Africa) Keith Diepraam | (South Africa) Bob Hewitt (South Africa) Frew McMillan | 3–6, 9–7, 3–6, 9–7, 6–3 |
| Loss | 1–2 | Jun 1969 | Bristol, UK | Grass | (United Kingdom) Roger Taylor | (Australia) John Newcombe (United States) Marty Riessen | 6–4, 13–15, 3–6 |
| Win | 2–2 | Jul 1970 | Gstaad, Switzerland | Clay | (United Kingdom) Roger Taylor | (Netherlands) Tom Okker (United States) Marty Riessen | 6–2, 6–3, 6–2 |
| Loss | 2–3 | Aug 1970 | Toronto, Canada | Clay | (Australia) Fred Stolle | (Australia) Bill Bowrey (United States) Marty Riessen | 3–6, 2–6 |
| Loss | 2–4 | Oct 1971 | Barcelona WCT, Spain | Clay | (Spain) Andrés Gimeno | (Socialist Federal Republic of Yugoslavia) Željko Franulović (Spain) Juan Gisbert | 6–7, 2–6, 6–7 |
| Win | 3–4 | Aug 1972 | Cleveland, US | Hard | (United Kingdom) Roger Taylor | (United States) Frank Froehling (United States) Charlie Pasarell | 7–6, 6–3 |
| Win | 4–4 | Sep 1972 | US Open | Grass | (United Kingdom) Roger Taylor | (Australia) Owen Davidson (Australia) John Newcombe | 6–4, 7–6^{(7–3)}, 6–3 |
| Loss | 4–5 | Oct 1972 | Vancouver WCT, Canada | Carpet (i) | (Australia) Allan Stone | (Australia) Bill Bowrey (United States) Clark Graebner | 6–7, 0–6 |
| Loss | 4–6 | Apr 1973 | Munich WCT, Germany | Carpet (i) | (United States) Cliff Richey | (Socialist Federal Republic of Yugoslavia) Niki Pilić (Australia) Allan Stone | 5–7, 7–5, 4–6 |
| Loss | 4–7 | Feb 1975 | San Antonio WCT, US | Hard | (United Kingdom) Mark Cox | (Australia) John Alexander (Australia) Phil Dent | 6–7, 6–4, 4–6 |
| Loss | 4–8 | Mar 1975 | Memphis, U.S. | Carpet (i) | (United Kingdom) Mark Cox | (United States) Erik van Dillen (United States) Dick Stockton | 6–1, 5–7, 4–6 |
| Loss | 4–9 | Mar 1975 | Atlanta WCT, U.S. | Carpet (i) | (United Kingdom) Mark Cox | (India) Anand Amritraj (India) Vijay Amritraj | 3–6, 2–6 |
| Loss | 4–10 | May 1975 | World Doubles, Mexico | Carpet (i) | (United Kingdom) Mark Cox | (United States) Brian Gottfried (Mexico) Raúl Ramírez | 6–7^{(6–8)}, 7–6^{(7–5)}, 2–6, 6–7^{(6–8)} |
| Loss | 4–11 | May 1975 | Las Vegas, US | Hard | (Australia) Bob Carmichael | (Australia) John Alexander (Australia) Phil Dent | 1–6, 4–6 |
| Win | 5–11 | Aug 1975 | Cincinnati, U.S. | Hard | (Australia) Phil Dent | (Mexico) Marcelo Lara (Mexico) Joaquín Loyo-Mayo | 7–6, 6–4 |
| Win | 6–11 | Aug 1975 | Toronto, Canada | Hard | (South Africa) Raymond Moore | (Czechoslovakia) Jan Kodeš (Romania) Ilie Năstase | 6–4, 5–7, 7–6 |
| Loss | 6–12 | Sep 1975 | Los Angeles, US | Hard | (United States) Marty Riessen | (India) Anand Amritraj (India) Vijay Amritraj | 6–7, 6–4, 4–6 |
| Loss | 6–13 | Mar 1976 | Washington WCT, US | Carpet (i) | (United Kingdom) Mark Cox | (United States) Eddie Dibbs (United States) Harold Solomon | 4–6, 5–7 |
| Loss | 6–14 | Jan 1979 | Baltimore, US | Carpet (i) | (India) Anand Amritraj | (United States) Marty Riessen (United States) Sherwood Stewart | 6–7, 4–6 |
| Loss | 6–15 | Feb 1979 | Rancho Mirage, US | Hard | (South Africa) Bruce Manson | (United States) Gene Mayer (United States) Sandy Mayer | 4–6, 6–7 |
| Win | 7–15 | Apr 1979 | Dayton, US | Carpet | (South Africa) Bruce Manson | (Australia) Ross Case (Australia) Phil Dent | 3–6, 6–3, 7–6 |

== Grand Slam singles performance timeline ==
Key
| W | F | SF | QF | #R | RR | Q# | DNQ | A | NH |

(W) winner; (F) finalist; (SF) semifinalist; (QF) quarterfinalist; (#R) rounds 4, 3, 2, 1; (RR) round-robin stage; (Q#) qualification round; (DNQ) did not qualify; (A) absent; (NH) not held; (SR) strike rate (events won / competed); (W–L) win–loss record.

| Tournament | 1962 | 1963 | 1964 | 1965 | 1966 | 1967 | 1968 | 1969 | 1970 | 1971 | 1972 | 1973 | 1974 | 1975 | 1976 | 1977 | | 1978 | 1979 | 1980 | SR |
|---|---|---|---|---|---|---|---|---|---|---|---|---|---|---|---|---|---|---|---|---|---|
| Australian Open | A | A | A | A | A | A | A | A | A | QF | A | A | A | A | A | A | A | A | A | A | 0 / 1 |
| French Open | 1R | 2R | QF | SF | SF | A | A | 1R | A | A | A | 2R | A | A | A | A | | A | A | A | 0 / 7 |
| Wimbledon | 1R | 1R | 2R | SF | SF | 4R | 3R | QF | 3R | 1R | A | A | 3R | A | 2R | 3R | | A | 1R | 2R | 0 / 15 |
| US Open | 3R | 2R | 3R | F | 3R | 2R | QF | 1R | 2R | A | 4R | 3R | A | 2R | A | 1R | | 1R | A | A | 0 / 14 |
| Strike rate | 0 / 3 | 0 / 3 | 0 / 3 | 0 / 3 | 0 / 3 | 0 / 2 | 0 / 2 | 0 / 3 | 0 / 2 | 0 / 2 | 0 / 1 | 0 / 2 | 0 / 1 | 0 / 1 | 0 / 1 | 0 / 2 | | 0 / 1 | 0 / 1 | 0 / 1 | 0 / 37 |

Note: The Australian Open was held twice in 1977, in January and December.
