= 1965 U.S. National Championships – Women's singles =

Women's singles
- 1965 U.S. National Championships

Final
- Champion: (Australia) Margaret Smith
- Runner-up: (United States) Billie Jean Moffitt
- Score: 8–6, 7–5

Details
- Seeds: 8

Events
Singles	men	women
Doubles	men	women
- U.S. National Championships

First-seeded Margaret Smith defeated fifth-seeded Billie Jean Moffitt 8–6, 7–5 in the final to win the women's singles tennis title at the 1965 U.S. National Championships.

== Seeds ==
The seeded players are listed below. Margaret Smith is the champion; others show in brackets the round in which they were eliminated.

1. (Australia) Margaret Smith (champion)
2. (Brazil) Maria Bueno (semifinals)
3. (United Kingdom) Ann Jones (quarterfinals)
4. (United States) Nancy Richey (semifinals)
5. (United States) Billie Jean Moffitt (finalist)
6. (France) Françoise Dürr (quarterfinals)
7. (United States) Carole Graebner (quarterfinals)
8. (Argentina) Norma Baylon (quarterfinals)

== Draw ==
=== Key ===
- Q = Qualifier
- WC = Wild card
- LL = Lucky loser
- r = Retired

=== Final eight ===
Quarterfinals
1	(Australia) Margaret Smith	6	6
6	(France) Françoise Dürr	1	0
8	(Argentina) Norma Baylon	4	5
4	(United States) Nancy Richey	6	7
2	(Brazil) Maria Bueno	8	1	9
7	(United States) Carole Graebner	6	6	7
3	(United Kingdom) Ann Jones	14	2
5	(United States) Billie Jean Moffitt	16	6

Semifinals
1	(Australia) Margaret Smith	6	6
4	(United States) Nancy Richey	2	2
2	(Brazil) Maria Bueno	2	3
5	(United States) Billie Jean Moffitt	6	6

Finals
1	(Australia) Margaret Smith	8	7
5	(United States) Billie Jean Moffitt	6	5

Preceded by 1965 Wimbledon Championships – Women's singles	Grand Slam women's singles	Succeeded by 1966 Australian Championships – Women's singles
