= Ted Hoehn =

American tennis player

- Full name: Edward Hoehn
- Country (sports): United States

Singles

Grand Slam singles results
- US Open: 1R (1961, 1965, 1966, 1967, 1969)

Edward Hoehn is an American former tennis player.

Hoehn was raised in Hanover, New Hampshire, and won state high school championships for singles and doubles in both 1957 and 1958. He played collegiate tennis for the University of North Carolina, where he was team captain for two years and twice won the ACC doubles championships.

In the 1960s he featured in the singles main draw of the US Championships/Open five times.

A resident of Vermont since 1968, Hoehn runs the Windridge Tennis & Sports Camps. He is a member of the Vermont Sports Hall of Fame (2014) and New England Hall of Fame (1992).
