= Frank Tutvin =

Canadian-American tennis player

- Country (sports): Canada; United States
- Born: August 23, 1945 (age 80) Montreal, Quebec, Canada
- Height: 6 ft 1 in (185 cm)
- Plays: Right-handed

Singles
- Career record: 91-103
- Career titles: 1

Grand Slam singles results
- French Open: 2R (1968)
- Wimbledon: 3R (1967)
- US Open: 2R (1965, 1966, 1967)

Frank Tutvin (born August 23, 1945) is a Canadian-American former professional tennis player.

Born in Montreal, Tutvin represented the United States at junior Davis Cup level, having lived with his parents in Florida for several years. He played collegiate tennis for the University of Miami.

Tutvin defeated Nikola Pilić in the first round of the 1965 U.S. Tennis Championships in a long five-set match.

Tutvin reached the singles third round of the 1967 Wimbledon Championships, competing as a Canadian.

Tutvin won the 1968 Western Open at Waterloo, Ontario defeating Joe Osadca in the final.

Outside of professional tennis he worked as a teaching pro at the Palm Bay Club in Miami.
