= 1966 U.S. National Championships – Women's singles =

Women's singles
- 1966 U.S. National Championships

Final
- Champion: (Brazil) Maria Bueno
- Runner-up: (United States) Nancy Richey
- Score: 6–3, 6–1

Details
- Draw: 64
- Seeds: 8

Events
Singles	men	women
Doubles	men	women
- U.S. National Championships

Second-seeded Maria Bueno defeated Nancy Richey 6–3, 6–1 in the final to win the women's singles tennis title at the 1966 U.S. National Championships.

== Seeds ==
The seeded players are listed below. Maria Bueno is the champion; others show in brackets the round in which they were eliminated.

1. (United States) Billie Jean King (second round)
2. (Brazil) Maria Bueno (champion)
3. (United States) Nancy Richey (finalist)
4. (France) Françoise Dürr (quarterfinals)
5. (United States) Rosemary Casals (semifinals)
6. (Argentina) Norma Baylon (quarterfinals)
7. (United Kingdom) Virginia Wade (quarterfinals)
8. (United States) Donna Fales (first round)

== Draw ==
=== Key ===
- Q = Qualifier
- WC = Wild card
- LL = Lucky loser
- r = Retired

=== Final eight ===
Quarterfinals
2	(Brazil) Maria Bueno	6	6
6	(Argentina) Norma Baylon	0	1
5	(United States) Rosemary Casals	6	6
4	(France) Françoise Dürr	4	4
3	(United States) Nancy Richey	6	6
7	(United Kingdom) Virginia Wade	3	1
(Australia) Madonna Schacht	1	2
(Australia) Kerry Melville	6	6

Semifinals
2	(Brazil) Maria Bueno	6	10	6
5	(United States) Rosemary Casals	2	12	3
3	(United States) Nancy Richey	6	6
(Australia) Kerry Melville	3	2

Finals
2	(Brazil) Maria Bueno	6	6
3	(United States) Nancy Richey	3	1

=== Earlier rounds ===
==== Section 1 ====
First round
2	(Brazil) Maria Bueno	6	6
(United States) Kathy Blake	0	0
(United States) Mary Ann Eisel	5	6	5
(United States) Lynn Abbes	7	4	7
(United States) Stephanie De Fina	3	6	6
(United States) Peachy Kellmeyer	6	4	0
(United States) Vicky Rodgers	6	6
(United States) Patricia Cody	3	4
(United States) Raymonde Jones	6	6
(United States) Joane Swanson	3	4
(Canada) Vicki Berner	10	6
(Canada) Susan Butt	8	0
(United States) Wendy Overton	6	6
(United States) Linda Tuero	4	0
(United States) Bonnie Logan	5	1
6	(Argentina) Norma Baylon	7	6

Second round
2	(Brazil) Maria Bueno	6	6
(United States) Lynn Abbes	3	3
(United States) Stephanie De Fina	6	3	8
(United States) Vicky Rodgers	2	6	6
(United States) Raymonde Jones	0	5
(Canada) Vicki Berner	6	7
(United States) Wendy Overton	4	5
6	(Argentina) Norma Baylon	6	7

Third round
2	(Brazil) Maria Bueno	6	6
(United States) Stephanie De Fina	2	4
(Canada) Vicki Berner	2	6	3
6	(Argentina) Norma Baylon	6	1	6

Quarterfinals
2	(Brazil) Maria Bueno	6	6
6	(Argentina) Norma Baylon	0	1

Preceded by 1966 Wimbledon Championships – Women's singles	Grand Slam women's singles	Succeeded by 1967 Australian Championships – Women's singles
