= Tennis at the 2015 European Youth Summer Olympic Festival =

Tennis at the 2015 European Youth Summer Olympic Festival

== Medal events ==
Event	Gold	Silver	Bronze
Boys Singles	Adrian Andreev; Bulgaria	Yshai Oliel; Israel	Tibo Colson; Belgium
Girls Singles	Lucie Kaňková; Czech Republic	Taisiya Pachkaleva; Russia	Selma Cadar; Romania
Boys Doubles	Italy; Gabriele Bosio; Riccardo Perin	Israel; Roi Ginat; Yshai Oliel	Czech Republic; Evžen Holiš; Tomáš Macháč
Girls Doubles	Slovenia; Kaja Juvan; Nika Radišič	Romania; Selma Cadar; Andreea Prisăcariu	Switzerland; Leonie Küng; Simona Waltert
