= Yshai Oliel =

Israeli tennis player (born 2000)

- Native name: ישי עוליאל
- Country (sports): Israel
- Residence: Ramla, Israel
- Born: 5 January 2000 (age 26) Ramla, Israel
- Height: 1.88 m (6 ft 2 in)
- Plays: Left-handed (two-handed backhand)
- Coach: Yoav Ben Zvi, Amos Mansdorf
- Prize money: US $143,602

Singles
- Career record: 7–8
- Career titles: 0
- Highest ranking: No. 305 (8 August 2022)
- Current ranking: No. 1,432 (19 October 2026)

Grand Slam singles results
- Australian Open Junior: F (2017)
- French Open Junior: 2R (2016, 2017)
- Wimbledon Junior: 2R (2017)
- US Open Junior: 3R (2016)

Doubles
- Career record: 0–2
- Career titles: 0
- Highest ranking: No. 809 (27 June 2022)

Grand Slam doubles results
- Australian Open Junior: 2R (2017)
- French Open Junior: W (2016)
- Wimbledon Junior: QF (2017)
- US Open Junior: SF (2016
Medal record
Representing Israel
European Youth Olympic Festival
| Silver medal – second place | 2015 Tbilisi | Singles |
| Silver medal – second place | 2015 Tbilisi | Doubles |
Junior Orange Bowl
| Gold medal – first place | 2012 Coral Gables | Singles |
| Gold medal – first place | 2014 Coral Gables | Singles |
- Last updated on: 19 October 2026.

Yshai Oliel (Hebrew: ישי עוליאל; born 5 January 2000) is an Israeli tennis player. He has a career-high ATP singles ranking of world No. 305 achieved on 8 August 2022 and a doubles ranking of No. 809 achieved on 27 June 2022.

He was the No. 1 Israeli from 4 October 2021 until 3 October 2022.

Oliel is a two-time Junior Orange Bowl champion, having won in 2012 and 2014. He also won the 2016 French Open Boys' Doubles title, with Patrik Rikl. He also reached the final in the boys' singles at the 2017 Australian Open.

== Early and personal life ==
Oliel is originally from Ramla, Israel. He is Jewish and his parents, Avraham and Floret Oliel, are of Moroccan Jewish descent. He is the youngest of their five children.

As a teenager he grew long, shoulder-length hair. However, his sister told him it was getting to be too much and that it was time "to be a man", so he cut his hair and donated it to children undergoing cancer treatment.

Oliel is currently in a relationship with Israeli tennis player Roni Lior.

== Junior career ==
Oliel started playing tennis at the age of 5. From the age of 9 he was a member of the David Squad, a non-profit tennis academy, which identifies the most talented Israeli players and develops them all the way to professional level. Oliel was supported by the David Squad until he turned professional at the age of 19.

He won the Junior Orange Bowl in the 12-and-under singles category in 2012, while Oliel was in 7th grade. He returned at 13 years of age, ranked first in the tournament, to win the 2014 Junior Orange Bowl in the 14-and-under singles category. That made him one of only nine tennis players to win the Junior Orange Bowl championship twice in its 70-year history, which list includes Andy Murray, Jimmy Connors, Jennifer Capriati, and Monica Seles.

As a 15-year-old in 2015, Oliel was ranked No. 48 among players 18-and-younger.

Oliel, at age 16, won the 2016 French Open Boys' Doubles title with Patrik Rikl of the Czech Republic, defeating Chung Yun-seong and Orlando Luz in the final 6–3, 6–4. Oliel said: "It helped that there were hundreds of Israelis and members of the Jewish community that came along to Roland Garros to cheer me along. I feel very proud to be out there representing Israel." He became the fourth Israeli to win a junior grand slam title, joining Dudi Sela (who won the same title in 2003), Anna Smashnova, and Shahar Pe'er, all of whom went on to become top-30 players.

At the 2016 Junior Boys' singles tournament at the US Open at age 16, after beating No. 2 seed Alex de Minaur of Australia in the second round 4–6, 6–2, 7–6^{(2)}, Oliel lost to No. 13 seed Nicola Kuhn of Spain. At the 2016 Junior Boys' doubles tournament at the US Open, Oliel and Zizou Bergs of Belgium made it to the semi-finals, where they lost to ultimate champions Juan Carlos Aguilar and Felipe Meligeni 4–6, 7–6^{(1)}, 10–2.

As a 16-year-old in September 2016, Oliel was ranked No. 39 among players 18-and-younger.

He lost to Hungarian Zsombor Piros in the boys' singles final at the 2017 Australian Open, which Oliel reached after beating top seed Yibing Wu 6–4, 3–6, 6–2 in the semifinals. Oliel had hoped to follow in the footsteps of Israeli junior champions Shahar Pe'er, who won the girls' Australian Open in 2004, and Anna Smashnova, who won the girls' French Open in 1991. He became the second Israeli to reach a final at a boys' Grand Slam event, following Noam Behr who lost in the final of the boys' US Open in 1992. The result allowed him to reach the No. 4 place in the Junior rankings.

== Professional career ==
=== 2017–2018 ===
Later in 2017, Oliel continued to slowly discover the professional circuit and made his first appearance in a Challenger tournament, in Sophia Antipolis for the Verrazzano Open. In December 2017, while still 17 years old, he won his first Futures tournament, in Sajur, Israel. With the victory he became the fourth player in the world born in the year 2000 to win a Futures title, joining Félix Auger-Aliassime, Nicola Kuhn, and Thiago Seyboth Wild. Following a few ITF Men's Circuit tournaments played with promising results in his home country (three semi-finals and a win), he was ranked No. 629 at the end of the 2017 ATP season, which constituted the best ranking of his young career. In March 2018, Oliel reached in the finals of an Israel F2 in Ramat HaSharon, Israel, where he fell to Harri Heliövaara. The next month, Oliel beat world #233 Václav Šafránek.

=== 2019–2020: Early success on the Futures and Challenger Tour ===
In May 2019, Oliel won the M15 Heraklion in Heraklion, Greece, defeating Britain's Lloyd Glasspool in the final, and in June 2019 he won the M15 Netanya in Netanya, Israel with a win in the finals over Gilbert Soares Klier Junior. He won the M15 Kiryat Shmona tournament, in September 2019, held at ITC Kiryat Shmona, defeating Britain's Jack Draper in the final, and the M15 Sajur in Sajur, Israel.

=== 2021: ATP debut, Israeli No. 1 player ===
Oliel reached a singles ranking of No. 381 on 4 October 2021, which was his career high at the time. With this ranking, he became the highest ranked Israeli tennis player in the world.

Oliel made his ATP debut at the 2021 St. Petersburg Open after receiving a wildcard into the main draw. He played John Millman in the first round, but was defeated 6–1, 6–1.

=== 2022: Second ATP tournament ===
In July 2022, Oliel reached the finals of the Marburg, (Germany) Clay M25. On 8 August 2022, he reached a career-high of world No. 305 in singles.

Oliel received a wildcard to his home tournament, the Tel Aviv Open. He lost to qualifier compatriot Edan Leshem in straight sets.

== National representation ==
=== Davis Cup ===
In March 2022, Oliel participated in the Davis Cup representing Israel against South Africa. Oliel played two singles matches and defeated world #34 Lloyd Harris and Ruan Roelofse. Oliel's win over Harris marked the biggest victory in the Israeli's career. Israel went on to defeat South Africa by a score of 3-1 and earned a promotion to the World Group I of the Davis Cup.

== Playing style ==
Oliel has been noted for his grace, timing, and tenacity. He has a forehand with a good deal of spin, a stable two-handed backhand, a good volley with excellent touch, and he moves well on the court and reads situations well. Former French Open and Wimbledon women's doubles champion Angela Buxton compared his style to that of Roger Federer, noting that he does not "force or muscle the ball".

== Junior Grand Slam finals ==
=== Singles: 1 (1 runner-up) ===
| Result | Year | Tournament | Surface | Opponent | Score |
|---|---|---|---|---|---|
| Loss | 2017 | Australian Open | Hard | (Hungary) Zsombor Piros | 6–4, 4–6, 3–6 |

=== Doubles: 1 (1 title) ===
| Result | Year | Tournament | Surface | Partner | Opponents | Score |
|---|---|---|---|---|---|---|
| Win | 2016 | French Open | Clay | (Czech Republic) Patrik Rikl | (South Korea) Chung Yun-seong (Brazil) Orlando Luz | 6–3, 6–4 |

== ATP Challenger and ITF Futures finals ==
=== Singles: 20 (9–12) ===
| Legend ATP Challenger (0–0) ITF Futures (8–11) | Finals by surface Hard (8–5) Clay (1–6) Grass (0–0) Carpet (0–0) |

| Result | W–L | Date | Tournament | Tier | Surface | Opponent | Score |
|---|---|---|---|---|---|---|---|
| Win | 1–0 | Dec 2017 | Israel F18, Sajur | Futures | Hard | (France) Tom Jomby | 7–6^{(8–6)}, 6–2 |
| Loss | 1–1 | Mar 2018 | Israel F2, Ramat HaSharon | Futures | Hard | (Finland) Harri Heliövaara | 1–6, 3–6 |
| Win | 2–1 | May 2019 | M15 Heraklion, Greece | World Tennis Tour | Hard | (United Kingdom) Lloyd Glasspool | 6–3, 6–4 |
| Loss | 2–2 | Jun 2019 | M15 Akko, Israel | World Tennis Tour | Hard | (Brazil) Gilbert Soares Klier Junior | 6–4, 4–6, 1–6 |
| Win | 3–2 | Jun 2019 | M15 Netanya, Israel | World Tennis Tour | Hard | (Brazil) Gilbert Soares Klier Junior | 3–6, 6–4, 6–3 |
| Loss | 3–3 | Aug 2019 | M15 Novi Sad, Serbia | World Tennis Tour | Clay | (Serbia) Marko Miladinović | 6–2, 1–6, 2–6 |
| Win | 4–3 | Sep 2019 | M15 Kiryat Shmona, Israel | World Tennis Tour | Hard | (United Kingdom) Jack Draper | 6–3, 5–7, 6–4 |
| Win | 5–3 | Sep 2019 | M15 Kiryat Shmona, Israel | World Tennis Tour | Hard | (Italy) Giorgio Ricca | 6–1, 7–6^{(8–6)} |
| Loss | 5–4 | Nov 2019 | M15 Heraklion, Greece | World Tennis Tour | Hard | (France) Geoffrey Blancaneaux | 1–6, 2–6 |
| Loss | 5–5 | May 2021 | M15 Ramat HaSharon, Israel | World Tennis Tour | Hard | (Israel) Ben Patael | 4–6, 4–6 |
| Loss | 5–6 | Aug 2021 | M25 Frankfurt am Main, Germany | World Tennis Tour | Clay | (Spain) Eduard Esteve Lobato | 6–7^{(1–7)}, 2–6 |
| Win | 6–6 | Aug 2021 | M25+H Bacău, Romania | World Tennis Tour | Clay | (France) Arthur Cazaux | 6–4, 4–6, 6–4 |
| Loss | 6–7 | Sep 2021 | M25 Říčany, Czech Republic | World Tennis Tour | Clay | (Hungary) Zsombor Piros | 3–6, 6–3, 3–6 |
| Win | 7–7 | Nov 2021 | M25 Meitar, Israel | World Tennis Tour | Hard | (United Kingdom) Stuart Parker | 6–2, 6–4 |
| Loss | 7–8 | Jul 2022 | M25 Marburg, Germany | World Tennis Tour | Clay | (Belgium) Raphaël Collignon | 2–6, 2–6 |
| Loss | 7–9 | May 2023 | M15 Antalya, Turkey | World Tennis Tour | Clay | (Argentina) Luciano Emanuel Ambrogi | 2–6, 5–7 |
| Loss | 7–10 | May 2023 | M15 Bucharest, Romania | World Tennis Tour | Clay | (Romania) Cezar Crețu | 4–6, 2–6 |
| Win | 8–10 | Jul 2023 | M25 Netanya, Israel | World Tennis Tour | Hard | (Poland) Filip Peliwo | 1–6, 7–6^{(7–5)}, 6–2 |
| Win | 9–10 | Aug 2023 | M15 Ra'anana, Israel | World Tennis Tour | Hard | (Israel) Amit Vales | 6–2, 6–0 |
| Loss | 9–11 | May 2024 | M25 Kachreti, Georgia | World Tennis Tour | Hard | Evgenii Tiurnev | 6–3, 2–6, 2–6 |
| Loss | 9–12 | June 2024 | M25 Villeneuve-Loubet, France | World Tennis Tour | Clay | (Switzerland) Remy Bertola | 6–3, 4–6, 3–6 |

=== Doubles: 1 (0–1) ===
| Legend ATP Challenger (0–0) ITF Futures (0–1) | Finals by surface Hard (0–1) Clay (0–0) Grass (0–0) Carpet (0–0) |

| Result | W–L | Date | Tournament | Tier | Surface | Partner | Opponents | Score |
|---|---|---|---|---|---|---|---|---|
| Loss | 0–1 | Mar 2017 | Israel F1, Ramat HaSharon | Futures | Hard | (Israel) Dekel Bar | (Hungary) Gabor Borsos (Lithuania) Laurynas Grigelis | 3–6, 4–6 |

== See also ==
- List of select Jewish tennis players
