= Butch Seewagen =

American tennis player (born 1946)

- Full name: George Lansing Seewagen
- Country (sports): United States
- Born: June 13, 1946 (age 80) New York City, United States
- Turned pro: 1970
- Plays: Right-handed

Singles
- Career record: 39–68
- Career titles: 0
- Highest ranking: No. 87 (October 15, 1973)

Grand Slam singles results
- French Open: 1R (1970)
- Wimbledon: 2R (1972)
- US Open: 3R (1967, 1971)

Doubles
- Career record: 22–44
- Career titles: 0

Grand Slam doubles results
- French Open: 2R (1973)
- Wimbledon: 2R (1970, 1972)
- US Open: 2R (1968, 1971, 1976)

Grand Slam mixed doubles results
- Wimbledon: 4R (1972)
- US Open: SF (1966)

George Lansing "Butch" Seewagen (born June 13, 1946) is a former professional tennis player from the United States.

== Biography ==
He was born in New York City on June 13, 1946, to George and Clella Seewagen. His father was the tennis coach at St. John’s University and a former player, who played against Don Budge at the 1936 U.S. National Championships.

An Orange Bowl winner in 1959, Seewagen was only 17 when he made his first appearance at the US National Championships. He was a member of the United States Junior Davis Cup team from 1963 to 1965.

With Kathy Blake, he made the semi-finals of the mixed doubles at the 1966 US National Championships.

At Rice University he twice received NCAA All-American honours, in 1967 and 1968. He won the 1969 United States Amateur Championships in a closely fought final against Zan Guerry, which he won 6–4 in the fifth set.

Seewagen, who turned professional in 1970, played against top seed Rod Laver in the first round at the 1970 Wimbledon Championships.

He defeated both Jimmy Connors and Jan Kodeš during the 1972 Grand Prix tennis season. His win over Connors came en route to a quarter-final appearance in the Tanglewood International Tennis Classic and he beat Kodeš in South Orange, where he also reached the quarter-finals. As a doubles player he was runner-up at two Grand Prix tournaments, the Swedish Open in 1971 and Roanoke International Tennis Tournament in 1973.

In 1975 he suffered a groin injury which left him unable to walk for nine months.

During his professional career he was also the head coach at Columbia University, of teams that included Vitas Gerulaitis and Eric Fromm.

He was inducted into the USTA Eastern Hall of Fame in 2005.

== Grand Prix career finals ==
=== Doubles: 2 (0–2) ===
Result	W/L	Date	Tournament	Surface	Partner	Opponents	Score
Loss	0–1	Jul 1971	Båstad, Sweden	Clay	(Chile) Jaime Pinto-Bravo	(Romania) Ilie Năstase (Romania) Ion Țiriac	6–7, 1–6
Loss	0–2	Jan 1973	Roanoke, US	Hard	(Australia) Ian Fletcher	(United States) Jimmy Connors (Spain) Juan Gisbert, Sr.	0–6, 6–7
