= 1967 U.S. National Championships – Women's singles =

Women's singles
- 1967 U.S. National Championships

Final
- Champion: (United States) Billie Jean King
- Runner-up: (United Kingdom) Ann Haydon-Jones
- Score: 11–9, 6–4

Details
- Seeds: 10

Events
Singles	men	women
Doubles	men	women
- U.S. National Championships

Top-seeded Billie Jean King defeated Ann Haydon-Jones in the final, 11–9, 6–4 to win the women's singles tennis title at the 1967 U.S. National Championships. King did not lose a set during the tournament.

== Seeds ==
The seeded players are listed below. Billie Jean King is the champion; others show in brackets the round in which they were eliminated.

1. (United States) Billie Jean King (champion)
2. (United Kingdom) Ann Haydon-Jones (finalist)
3. (France) Françoise Dürr (semifinals)
4. (United States) Nancy Richey (withdrawn)
5. (Australia) Lesley Turner (semifinals)
6. (Brazil) Maria Bueno (second round)
7. (United States) Rosemary Casals (fourth round)
8. (United States) Mary-Ann Eisel (third round)
9. (United Kingdom) Virginia Wade (fourth round)
10. (Australia) Kerry Melville (fourth round)

== Draw ==
=== Key ===
- Q = Qualifier
- WC = Wild card
- LL = Lucky loser
- r = Retired

=== Final eight ===
Quarterfinals
1	(United States) Billie Jean King	6	6
(South Africa) Annette Van Zyl	1	4
(United States) Valerie Ziegenfuss	0	3
3	(France) Françoise Dürr	6	6
4	(Australia) Lesley Turner	6	6
7	(United Kingdom) Rita Bentley	1	2
(United States) Peaches Bartkowicz	5	6	1
2	(United Kingdom) Ann Haydon-Jones	7	2	6

Semifinals
1	(United States) Billie Jean King	6	6
3	(France) Françoise Dürr	2	4
5	(Australia) Lesley Turner	2	4
2	(United Kingdom) Ann Haydon-Jones	6	6

Finals
1	(United States) Billie Jean King	11	6
2	(United Kingdom) Ann Haydon-Jones	9	4

Preceded by 1967 Wimbledon Championships – Women's singles	Grand Slam women's singles	Succeeded by 1968 Australian Championships – Women's singles
