= Mike Sprengelmeyer =

American tennis player

- Full name: Michael Sprengelmeyer
- Country (sports): United States
- Born: July 6, 1946 (age 80) Dubuque, Iowa
- Plays: Right-handed

Singles
- Career record: 1–4

Grand Slam singles results
- US Open: 1R (1966, 1967, 1969)

Michael Sprengelmeyer (born July 6, 1946) is an American former professional tennis player.

A native of Dubuque, Iowa, Sprengelmeyer played collegiate tennis for Southern Illinois University. His elder brothers, twins Bob and Roy, are both SIU Hall of Famers. He featured in the US Open main draw three times. In 1967 he played one of the longest three-set professional matches on record against Dick Knight in Southampton, New York, which he lost 30–32, 6–3, 17–19, across five and a half hours. The first set alone took three hours to complete.

Sprengelmeyer, a member of the Iowa Tennis Hall of Fame, is the father of tennis player Mitch Sprengelmeyer.
