= Art Carrington =

American tennis player

- Full name: Arthur Carrington
- Country (sports): United States
- Born: Elizabeth, New Jersey

Singles
- Career record: 0–3
- Highest ranking: No. 241 (June 3, 1974)

Grand Slam singles results
- US Open: 1R (1966, 1973)

Arthur Carrington is an American former professional tennis player.

Born and raised in Elizabeth, New Jersey, Carrington attended Hampton University on an athletic scholarship.

Carrington competed in the American Tennis Association (ATA), which was a version of the USTA for African-American players. He finished runner-up in 1972 and his final loss to Horace Reid was the first to be televised, on Boston's WGBH-TV. The following year he won the title.

In 1980 he established the Carrington Tennis Academy at Hampshire College.
