= Peter van Lingen =

South African tennis player

- Country (sports): South Africa
- Born: 8 February 1943 (age 82)
- Plays: Right-handed

Singles
- Career record: 5–6

Grand Slam singles results
- French Open: 1R (1966)
- Wimbledon: 1R (1966)
- US Open: 3R (1967)

Peter van Lingen (born 8 February 1943) is a South African former professional tennis player.

Originally from Pretoria, van Lingen played collegiate tennis for Oral Roberts University (OSU), where he was beaten only twice in singles. In 1971 he received the President's Trophy, an award for the best scholar athlete at OSU.

Van Lingen, who was a Davis Cup alternate for South Africa, reached the singles third round of the 1967 U.S. National Championships. He also featured in the main draws of the French Championships and Wimbledon.

A long time resident of Nashville, van Lingen has won numerous Father-Son championship with son Van and the pair were consistently number one ranked in the early 1990s. He is a 1996 inductee in the Tennessee Tennis Hall of Fame.
