= Spaghetti racquet =

Type of tennis racquet

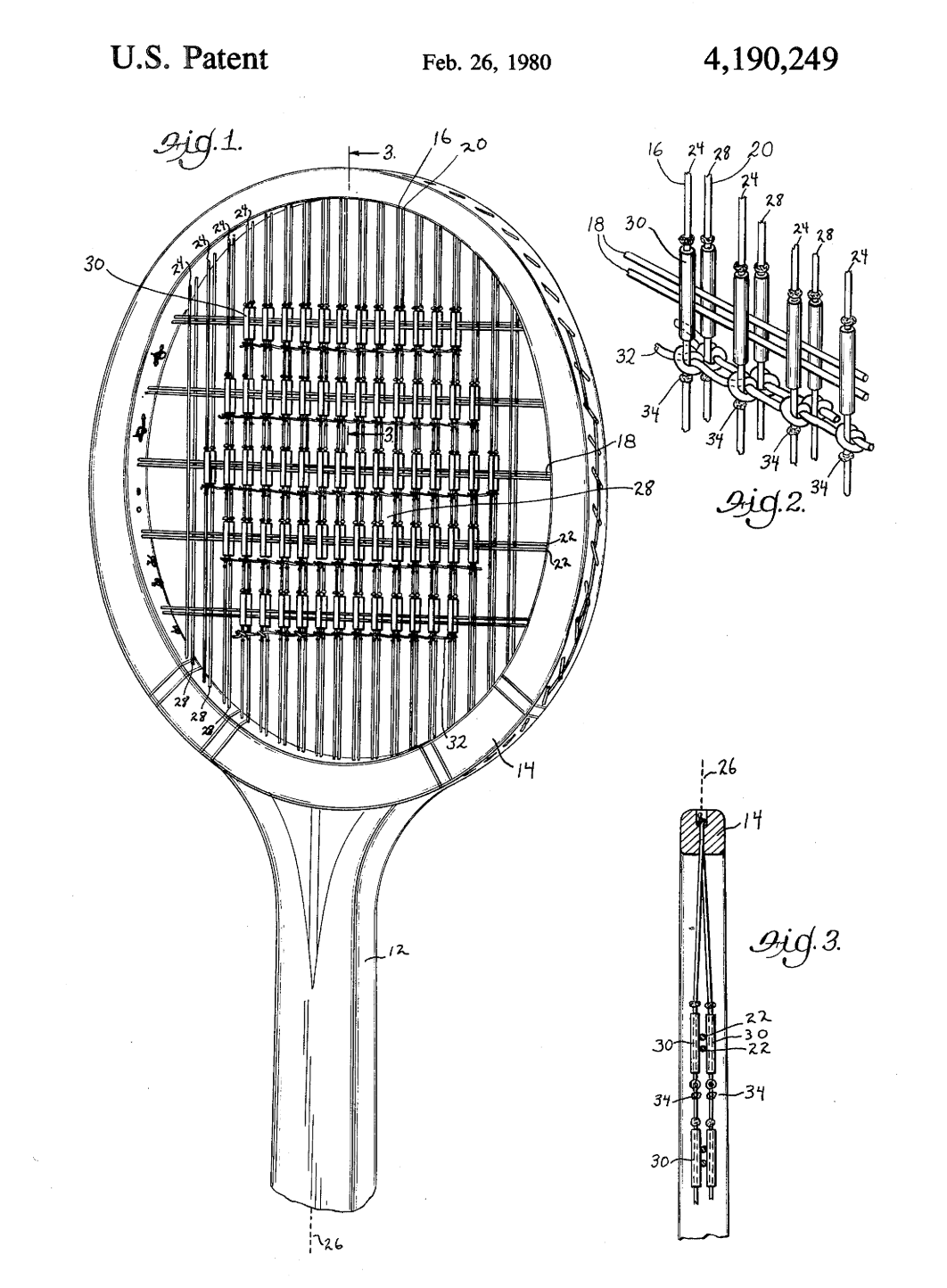
Werner Fischer's 1977 U.S. patent application for the spaghetti racquet

The "spaghetti" racquet was a type of double-strung tennis racquet that had a brief spike in popularity in the fall of 1977, revolutionizing the sport for about a month before being banned at the top levels of play. It applied far more spin to a tennis ball than conventionally strung racquets, leading to disorienting movements through the air, especially after bounces.

== Design ==
The racquet frame is not what is unusual about the spaghetti racquet; the difference lies in how it is strung. Rather than one set of interwoven strings, it features two stacked atop each other. The vertical (or main) strings and the horizontal (or cross) strings do not intertwine; rather, the cross strings sit between the two main ones, leaving all the strings a greater range of motion.

There are fewer cross strings than on a traditional racquet — typically 5 or 6 pairs instead of the usual 20. Where the main and cross strings meet, the main strings are protected by small segments of sheath tubing, and the main strings are tied to one another using a thin filament. (The plastic tubing, resembling macaroni, gave the racquet its “spaghetti” name.)

The extra freedom provided to the main strings allows it to transfer more rotational energy to the ball, allowing much faster spin and far less predictable motion.

Tennis great Arthur Ashe described the racquet thusly: “Because the main strings of the racket are doubled over the supporting—horizontal—strings and tied to them, they all move with a sliding motion, giving the ball topspin of such acute velocity that you can't duplicate it. If Borg used it, God knows what would happen. And this increased spin means that you can hit the ball very hard and know it will land inside the baseline with that spin pulling it down. It also means that a guy coming to the net against it is open to the most exaggerated lobs, which he can't possibly reach.”

== Origin ==
Double-strung racquets had some limited precedent in the sport. In 1881, two inventors, George Hookham of Birmingham and Alexander Hodgkinson of Manchester, filed British patents “to increase the effective striking surface in tennis racquets” by having strings “instead of being sunk below the level of the frame as is usual…arranged flush with one edge thereof, or a double stringing, i.e. a stringing on each side of the bat.” Double-strung racquets had a brief vogue in the 1920s but their use faded quickly.

The spaghetti racquet was created in 1972 by German horticulturalist and amateur tennis player Werner Fischer. He wanted to bring some of the spin possible with table tennis paddles — made with layers of rubber and foam — to standard tennis.

Top German players rejected the new racquet, but a low-level player named Erwin Müller began to have success with it. A few other players, including Frenchman Georges Goven and Australian Barry Phillips-Moore, adopted Fischer’s racquet or made their own versions. Phillips-Moore called it “the greatest thing since boiled water,” but it remained little known.

Fischer applied for a U.S. patent for the racquet in May 1977 and was granted Patent No. 4,190,249 in 1980.

== Use in 1977 ==
The spaghetti racquet first gained public attention in 1977 through the play of 22-year-old Mike Fishbach, a native of Great Neck, Long Island. While playing in Brussels on a European tour that year, he noticed Phillips-Moore’s racquet, though the Australian — playing surprisingly well for a 40-year-old — would not let Fishbach examine it up close. Later, in a camera shop in Gstaad, Switzerland, Fishbach saw a similarly strung racquet and, while the shop’s owner would not let him buy it, he did let Fishbach see it up close — close enough that, upon returning to Long Island, he and his brother Peter set about recreating one with nylon strings, plastic tubing and adhesive tape.

On August 15, The New York Times reported on Fishbach’s success in lower-level events “with a weird racquet,” describing its “loose, dangling strings that seem to catch the ball and hurl it across the net like a slingshot with tremendous spin.”

Fishbach, ranked No. 200 in the world, used the racquet to qualify for the 1977 U.S. Open, where he defeated Billy Martin 6–1, 7–5 on August 31 in the first round. He then upset 16th-seeded Stan Smith (who had won the 1971 US Open) 6–0, 6–2 on September 2. On September 3, Fishbach finally lost in the third round to John Feaver, 2–6, 6–4, 6–0. Feaver told reporters: “You don't know what's going on with the bloody thing. You can't hear the ball come off the face. It looks like an egg in flight. When it bounces, it can jump a yard this way or that, and up or down.”

The racquet became a phenomenon. On September 20, Georges Goven used it to upset world No. 9 Ilie Năstase in the first round of a Paris Grand Prix tournament. After the match, Năstase told reporters it “the first time I've played against someone using one of those things. It's also the last. In future I shall refuse to play. I was running the whole time against Goven.”

A little-known Frenchman, Christophe Roger-Vasselin, used the racquet to reach his first career finals at the Marcel Porée Cup, losing to Guillermo Vilas. (Using the racquets, Roger-Vasselin and Jacques Thamin won the tournament's doubles competition, beating Ilie Năstase and Ion Țiriac in the final.) Some players, including Spain’s Jose Higueras and Italy’s Paolo Bertolucci, pulled out of a tournament in France in protest of the racquet’s use by other players.

By September 29, Năstase had changed his mind and begun playing with the racquet Georges Goven had upset him with.

The racquet’s peak came on October 2, when Năstase used it in the final of the 1977 Raquette d'Or in Aix-en-Provence against Vilas. Năstase won the first two sets, 6–1 and 7–5, before Vilas resigned before the start of the third set. "I am completely disconcerted and discouraged by the trajectory of those balls," Vilas told reporters. “You understand that Năstase plus the racquet, that’s just too much.”

Vilas’ resignation had historical significance. Vilas was on a 46-match winning streak leading into the Năstase match, and he followed it with another 27-match winning streak, making it clear that Vilas' dominance continued long enough for him to have won 74 straight—had it not been for the intrusion of spaghetti racquet—which would have been the longest such streak in men’s tennis history. (Vilas’ 46-match streak is second all-time to Bjorn Borg’s 53.)

== Ban from professional play ==
By the time Vilas walked off the court, the spaghetti racquet’s days were already numbered. On October 1, the executive committee of the International Tennis Federation issued a temporary ban on all double-strung racquets at its tournaments. The ban took effect two days later, on October 3, making the Năstase/Vilas match the last major professional competition to feature the racquet. The United States Tennis Association followed suit, banning the racquet in USTA-organized tournaments on October 19.

In the following months, some argued for its legalization, including Don Candy, then the coach of Pam Shriver: “Why do we need a ruling? If the other guy is doing well with a spaghetti racquet, then you get one too.”

Werner Fischer, the racquet’s inventor, traveled to Dallas to lobby officials of the Association of Tennis Professionals on its behalf. USTA president Slew Hester argued: “You can play tennis with a tomato can on a broomstick if you think you can win with it.”

But the ITF voted on July 13, 1978, to ban the spaghetti racquet, defining a regulation racquet for the first time.

Pro-spaghetti partisans put up a fight. Fisher signed over rights to market the racquet to Gunter Harz, a native German living in Omaha. Harz announced what he called the International Open Tennis Federation, which ran a series of 32 tournaments he called “Spaghetti Bowls.” He also launched a manufacturing company named Play Spaghetti and sued the USTA for $2 million, calling its ban an illegal restraint of trade.

Harz — who sometimes falsely claimed to have invented the racquet, rather than adapting Fisher’s version — also claimed the spaghetti racquet’s softer stringing produced lower levels of vibration and a lower risk of elbow or shoulder injury.

In 1981, a U.S. appeals court upheld the USTA’s ban, saying it furthered the association’s “legitimate goals of preserving the essential character and integrity of the game of tennis.”
