= Luis-Augusto García =

Mexican tennis player

- Country (sports): Mexico
- Born: Mexico

Singles

Grand Slam singles results
- US Open: 3R (1966, 1967)

Luis-Augusto García is a Mexican tennis player. In 1966 and 1967 he reached the third round of the US Open.
