= Peter Fishbach =

American tennis player

- Country (sports): United States
- Born: August 29, 1947 (age 78) Bronx, New York, U.S.
- Height: 5 ft 11 in (180 cm)
- Plays: Right-handed

Singles
- Career record: 2–12

Grand Slam singles results
- US Open: 2R (1967, 1968)

Doubles
- Career record: 7–20

Grand Slam doubles results
- Wimbledon: 1R (1978)
- US Open: 2R (1968, 1971, 1976)

Peter Fishbach (born August 29, 1947) is an American former professional tennis player.

== Biography ==
Fishbach was born and raised in New York City. He attended Great Neck North High School. In 1963, 1964, and 1965 he was the New York State Public Schools Athletic Association tennis singles champion. He is the son of Joe Fishbach, who is considered a pioneer of indoor tennis courts, opening the country's first in 1958. His younger brother Mike Fishbach was a professional player, most famous for his controversial use of the "spaghetti racquet".

A right-handed player, Fishbach played collegiate tennis for the University of Michigan. He also competed on tour, twice getting through to the second round of the US Open, in 1967 and 1968. His win in the former, against John Sharpe, went to 16–14 in the fifth set.

At the 1969 Maccabiah Games in Israel, he and partner Tom Karp were defeated by American Davis Cup player Allen Fox and Ronald Goldman in the semifinals.

Fishbach won the USLTA Eastern Clay Court Championships in 1969 defeating Don Rubell in the final. His father, Joe Fishbach, had been runner-up in this tournament in 1938.

He is a former coach of South African player Christo van Rensburg.
