= Charlie Pasarell =

Puerto Rican tennis player and promoter (born 1944)

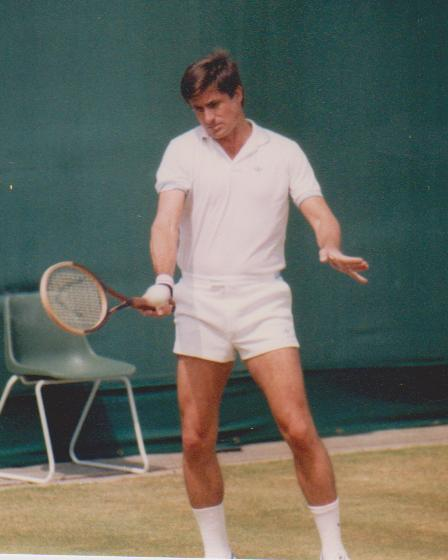
- Wimbledon 1985, Over 35s Doubles
- Full name: Charles Manuel Pasarell, Jr.
- Country (sports): United States
- Residence: Indian Wells, California, U.S.
- Born: February 12, 1944 (age 82) San Juan, Puerto Rico
- Height: 1.85 m (6 ft 1 in)
- Turned pro: 1968 (amateur from 1960)
- Retired: 1979
- Plays: Right-handed (one-handed backhand)
- Int. Tennis HoF: 2013 (member page)

Singles
- Career record: 201-220 (Open era)
- Career titles: 23
- Highest ranking: No. 11 (1966, World's Top 20)

Grand Slam singles results
- Australian Open: 3R (1976, 1977^{Jan})
- French Open: 3R (1973)
- Wimbledon: QF (1976)
- US Open: QF (1965)

Doubles
- Career record: 236–201 (Open era)
- Career titles: 30
- Highest ranking: No. 22 (August 23, 1977)

Grand Slam doubles results
- Australian Open: F (1977)^{(J)}
- French Open: F (1970)
- Wimbledon: QF (1968, 1974)
- US Open: F (1965, 1969)

Charles Manuel Pasarell Jr. (born February 12, 1944) is a Puerto Rican-American former tennis player, tennis administrator and founder of the current Indian Wells tournament. He has also commented for the Tennis Channel and with Arthur Ashe and Sheridan Snyder formed the U.S. National Junior Tennis League, since renamed National Junior Tennis and Learning (NJTL). He was ten times ranked in the top ten of the U.S. and No. 1 in 1967 and world No. 11 in 1966.

Representing the United States as a player, he has been heavily engaged in the administration of the professional game from the inception of the ATP in 1972 and has been Vice President when he was still playing and until recently on the Board of Directors representing the Americas tournaments. In 2013, Pasarell was elected into the International Tennis Hall of Fame.

== Tennis career ==
He is also known as Charlito ("Little Charlie") because his father had the same name and was also a gifted tennis player, being the champion of Puerto Rico six times in the 1950s.

Pasarell was a prestigious junior and first appeared on the cover of "World Tennis Magazine" at the age of 13 in 1958. He won over half dozen Orange Bowl titles and five US junior titles including the US juniors in singles and doubles with Clark Graebner in 1961. He first appeared in the U.S. Championships at Forest Hills in 1960 and was first ranked nationally that year. In 1962, he played at the Caribe Hilton Championships in San Juan, Puerto Rico. This was arguably the biggest tournament in the whole of Central, Caribbean and South America. Charlie was only just 18 and beat U.S. No. 7 Ron Holmberg, followed by Mexican No. 1, Mario Llamas, 6–0, 6–0 in the quarterfinals (avenging a similar defeat of his 14-year-old brother Stanley earlier in the tournament). In the semifinals, Charlie met Rod Laver, who would later win his first Grand Slam that year. He took the first set 6–0 before losing in three sets. World Tennis reported that "The newspapers and magazines in Puerto Rico have put Khrushchev (Soviet leader behind the Cuban Missile Crisis) on the second page and Charlito on the first".

He attended and graduated from the University of California, Los Angeles, where he won the NCAA men's singles and doubles with Ian Crookenden of New Zealand in 1966, one year after his friend and teammate Arthur Ashe won those titles. He reached No. 1 in the U.S. rankings in 1967 and became the first man in over 30 years to win the U.S. National Indoors in successive years. This tournament was the biggest indoor tournament in the world. While at UCLA, he received coaching from Pancho Segura at the Beverly Hills Tennis Club.

Pasarell competed in major tournaments from 1960 through 1979, with his most successful showings coming in doubles. He reached the finals in men's doubles at the U.S. Championships in 1965 with Frank Froehling and 1969 with Dennis Ralston, the French Open with Arthur Ashe in 1970, and the Australian Open in 1977 with Erik van Dillen. He was a quarterfinalist at the U.S. National Championships in 1965 and Wimbledon in 1976. Pasarell was also a member of the U.S. Davis Cup team in 1966, 1967, 1968, and 1974. In doubles, Pasarell's most significant wins were the 1967 U.S. National Indoor Championships with Arthur Ashe; the inaugural American Airlines Games in 1974 with Sherwood Stewart which evolved to the current tournament in Indian Wells and the Alan King Classic in 1976 with Arthur Ashe. The latter two at the time were two of the richest most prestigious tournaments in the world.

In 1969, Pasarell played Pancho Gonzales in what was, until 2010, the longest match in Wimbledon history in terms of the number of games played. The 41-year-old Gonzales finally defeated the 25-year-old 22–24, 1–6, 16–14, 6–3, 11–9 after a battle that lasted 5 hours and 12 minutes. Pasarell was also the first man to beat the reigning champion in the first round at Wimbledon when in 1967 he beat Manuel Santana. In 1968, he narrowly lost to Ken Rosewall in the second round. Rex Bellamy, tennis correspondent of The Times, started his article the next day by stating that "The first open Wimbledon produced its first great match", and further stated: "Among the men who climb to high places there is a saying that the mountains bring you three things - men, battle, and beauty. The men are true, the battle is the only kind worth fighting, and the beauty in life. Rosewall and Pasarell took us to the mountains yesterday - and the air was like wine." Finally, after covering other matches, the article ends, "Yet the abiding memory will be of Rosewall and Pasarell. If they show films in Valhalla, this is a match the gods will want to see." Pasarell achieved his best result at Wimbledon in 1976, when he lost in the quarterfinals to former world No. 1 Ilie Năstase, after wins against Jun Kamiwazumi, Vijay Amritraj, Adriano Panatta (ranked No. 4 in the world, having won both the Italian and French Opens), and Phil Dent.

1977 was Pasarell's last full-time tour and he started the year very well with a last 16 appearance in the Australian Open losing to eventual runner up Guillermo Vilas. A semifinal at the South Australian Open including a win over Arthur Ashe (in their last match) and a quarterfinal at the American Airlines Games (a forerunner of the Indian Wells event) with wins over Balázs Taróczy, Vijay Amritraj and Roscoe Tanner before losing narrowly to then world No. 4 Brian Gottfried in three sets. He then had a bad run of form signalling the slow down of his career. He finished ranked 77 on the ATP computer and 25 in the U.S. He had also started the year well in doubles with Erik van Dillen. In 1978, Pasarell's career continued to wind down, he was not given a wild card to Wimbledon and lost in the first round of qualifying to Jan Šimbera. In 1979, he qualified for both Wimbledon and the US Open and started to play veterans events. He made his last attempt to qualify for the main draw at Wimbledon in 1984 aged 40 when he was not invited to take part in the over 35's singles event and lost in the first round to Jeff Turpin. He continued to play regularly on the seniors' tour until the end of 1985 and then stopped playing completely in 1988. He returned in 1992 to play regularly in the US Open Seniors events until his last appearance in 2002, he also played in a veterans event in Puerto Rico in 1993.

=== Long matches ===
Pasarell's match with Gonzales was the longest at Wimbledon until beaten in 2010 by the match between John Isner and Nicolas Mahut which lasted 11 hours and 5 minutes over three days and comprised 183 games. However, in 1968 on February 17, Allison Danzig of The New York Times reported that Pasarell played 9 hours and 12 minutes of tennis in the U.S. National Indoors in just over 24 hours. He played a 6-hour 20 minute doubles with Ron Holmberg losing to Mark Cox and Bobby Wilson 26–24, 17–19, 30–28. Then less than 15 hours later the reigning two time champion lost in front of a capacity crowd to Clark Graebner in a semifinal that lasted 3 hours 12 minutes the score being 16–14, 4–6, 8–6, 4–6, 6–3. Danzig wrote: "In all, Pasarell played 217 games in just over 24 hours, and that must stand as a record in a National Championship tournament". These matches were played when the game was slower and also no seats were allowed on the court.

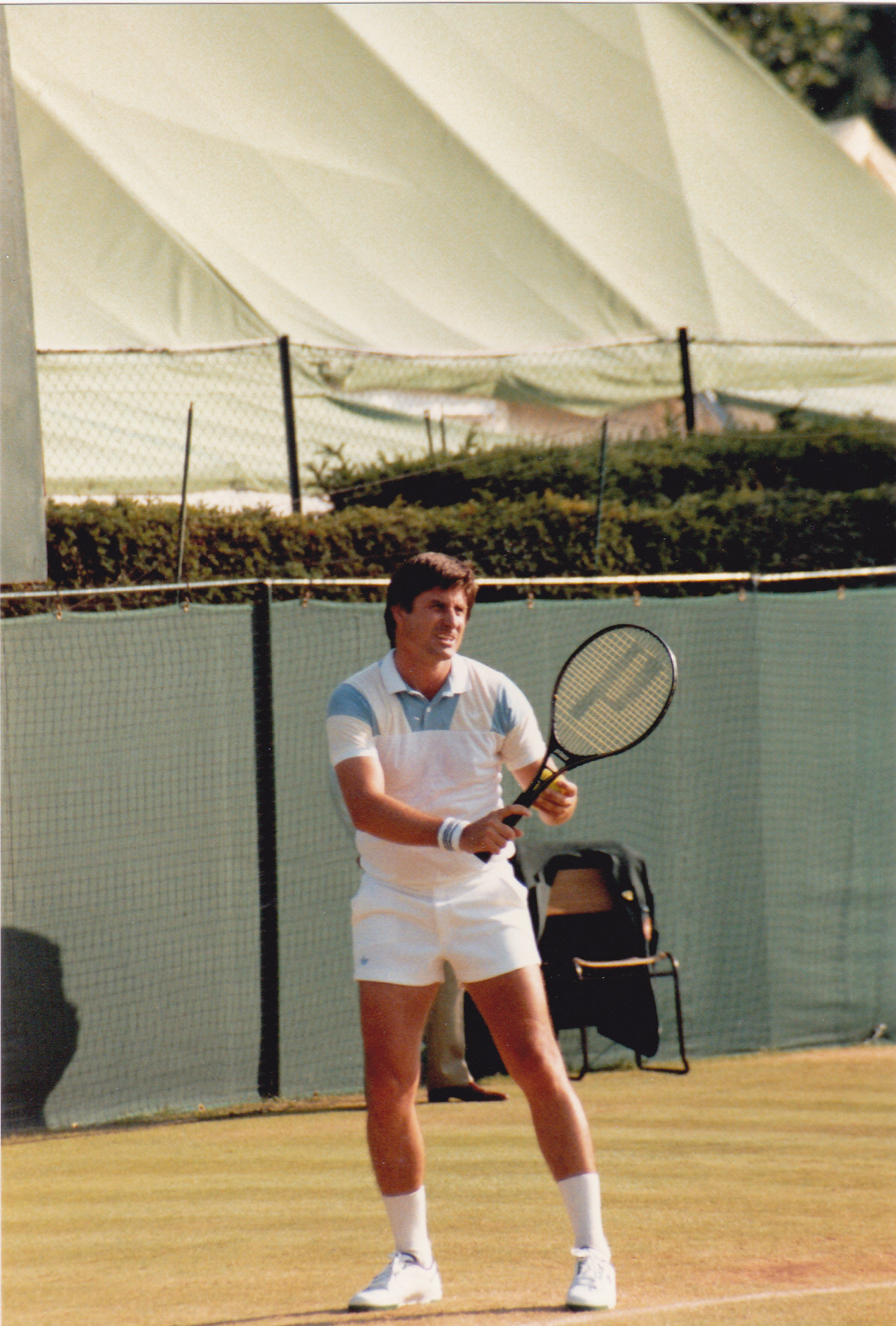
Charlie Pasarell Wimbledon 1986

== Playing style ==
Pasarell was a very stylish player, and was coached by the celebrated Welby Van Horn (the runner-up in the 1939 U.S. Championships) at the Caribe Hilton Hotel, San Juan, Puerto Rico. In his 1988 book Open Tennis: The First Twenty Years, British news correspondent, radio commentator and sports writer Richard Evans wrote that "Lack of speed and a less than energetic attitude towards training probably prevented Pasarell from doing full justice to his ability. When we were on tour together in Africa in 1971 (for the $25,000 Marlboro African Grand Prix, along with Marty Riessen, Tom Okker and Arthur Ashe, and his [Pasarell's] new bride Shireen née Fareed), Ashe would tell the kids: 'Watch Charlie play and copy his strokes. He's got the best strokes in the world.'" Pasarell also had a very good service, and in 1967 at the U.S. National Indoors, the celebrated writer and player Eugene Scott gave the opinion that Pasarell and Ashe had the two hardest serves in the world.

Rex Bellamy of The Times made the following observations regarding the 1968 Rosewall match mentioned above: "Pasarell has a straight back and broad shoulders. He is splay-footed and walks with a drawal, repeatedly pulling at his trousers as if adjusting a gun belt. His arms swing menacingly and seem to itch for a challenge to a fast draw. He has the slow, casual assurance of those poker-faced heroes in films about the old West. And his game is a gambler's, with explosive services and groundstrokes. He gambled now, and he often won." Regarding Pasarell's 1976 win over Panatta at Wimbledon, Bellamy wrote: "Pasarell moves so slowly between points that at times he seems to be flirting with reverse gear. He has fast eyes and hands but is otherwise designed exclusively for leisure. His shots are like the lashes of a whip, or sudden flashes of lightning across a muggy, drowsy landscape."

Joel Drucker wrote in his article in the Tennis Channel published on March 14, 2014, after Pasarell was elected to the International Tennis Hall of Fame the following description:

Pasarell was a player ranked number one in the U.S. in 1967. His motion involved a hip turn as he swung his racquet back. The toss was consistent, and the delivery reached different areas of the court. Ray Moore, who partnered with Pasarell at Indian Wells for twenty-five years and serves as the BNP Paribas Open CEO, described the service motion as fluid. Pasarell has maintained a principle of aiming for high goals throughout his life.

== Grand Slam finals ==
=== Doubles (4 runner-ups) ===
Result	Year	Championship	Surface	Partner	Opponents	Score
Loss	1965	U.S. Championships	Grass	(United States) Frank Froehling	(Australia) Roy Emerson (Australia) Fred Stolle	4–6, 12–10, 5–7, 3–6
Loss	1969	US Open	Grass	(United States) Dennis Ralston	(Australia) Ken Rosewall (Australia) Fred Stolle	6–2, 5–7, 11–13, 3–6
Loss	1970	French Open	Clay	(United States) Arthur Ashe	(Romania) Ilie Năstase (Romania) Ion Țiriac	2–6, 4–6, 3–6
Loss	1977^{(J)}	Australian Open	Grass	(United States) Erik van Dillen	(United States) Arthur Ashe (Australia) Tony Roche	4–6, 4–6

== Singles titles ==
The following is a list of the singles titles that Pasarell won in his career:

YEAR  TOURNAMENT                                FINALIST
1961  Riverside Enterprise, California	        Dave Reed U.S.
1962  West Hollywood                            Roger Werksman U.S.
1962  Westerns, Indianapolis	                Marty Riessen U.S.
1963  Phoenix Thunderbird	                Allen Fox U.S.
1964  UCLA Championships	                Dave Reed U.S.
1964  Phoenix Thunderbird	                Dennis Ralston U.S.
1966  Philadelphia Indoors	                Ian Crookenden NZL
1965  Ojai Tennis Tournament, California	Stan Smith U.S.
1965  Pennsylvania Grass Courts                 Roy Emerson AUS
1966  Philadelphia Indoors	                Arthur Ashe U.S.
1966  U.S. National Indoors	                Ron Holmberg U.S.
1966  U.S. NCCA (Intercollegiates)              Stan Smith U.S.
1967  Richmond Invitation	                Arthur Ashe U.S.
1967  U.S. National Indoors	                Arthur Ashe U.S.
1967  Pacific Coast Championships	        Cliff Richey U.S.
1968  Eastern Grass Courts	                Clark Graebner U.S.
1969  All Services Championships	        Brian Cheney U.S.
1971  Lagos Classic	                        Marty Riessen U.S.
1971  Ivory Coast Classic	                Arthur Ashe U.S.
1972  Clean Air Classic, New York	        Pancho Gonzales U.S.
1973  Glennwood Manor Inv, Kansas City	        Tony Roche AUS
1974  Altamira, Caracas, Venezuela	        Eddie Dibbs U.S.
1976  San Jose International	                Andrew Pattison U.S.

Source: World Tennis Magazine

== Post-retirement ==
Pasarell began a tournament in La Quinta, California that evolved into a premier professional tennis event, the BNP Paribas Open in Indian Wells. He had been the longtime Director of that tournament until retiring from that position in 2012. Pasarell is also a commentator for The Tennis Channel television. He is a member of the Intercollegiate Men's Tennis Hall of Fame and the Southern California Tennis Association Hall of Fame.

In 2001, a Golden Palm Star on the Palm Springs Walk of Stars was dedicated to him. Pasarell was voted into the UCLA Athletics Hall of Fame in 2012.

In July 2013, Pasarell was inducted into the International Tennis Hall of Fame.

In 2024, the USTA honored Pasarell with the National Junior Tennis and Learning (NJTL) Founders’ Service Award, which recognizes an individual who has demonstrated a longstanding commitment to positive youth development through tennis and education, delivers outstanding service to under-resourced children with free or low-cost tennis, and provides education and life-skills programming.

== Family ==
Charlie is a descendant of the Puerto Rican writer Manuel Zeno Gandia. His family's name has been synonymous with tennis in Puerto Rico since the 1930s. Apart from his father Charles senior and mother Dora who were both island champions; Jose Luis Pasarell, Charlie's uncle was island champion in 1939, and his other uncle Nat was also highly ranked. His Auntie Maggie Pasarell de Kleis won the ladies doubles title in the 1950s. Charlie's brother Stanley who is now developing a golf course in Puerto Rico along with Charlie, was a very useful player, he won the U.S. junior doubles title with Tico Carrero in 1966. Stan played in the U.S. Championships at Forest Hills six times between 1965 and 1971. In 1967, the Pasarell family won the USTA Family of the Year award. Charlie married Shireen Fareed in 1971, the daughter of the U.S. Davis Cup Doctor Omar Fareed, they have two children Fara and Charles (who represented Choate Rosemary Hall, Tennis).
