= 1967 U.S. National Championships (tennis) =

- Date: August 30 – September 10
- Edition: 87th
- Category: Grand Slam (ITF)
- Surface: Grass
- Location: Forest Hills, Queens; New York City, New York (S); Doubles; Brookline, Massachusetts, United States (D)
- Venue: West Side Tennis Club (S); Longwood Cricket Club (D)

Champions

Men's singles
- (Australia) John Newcombe

Women's singles
- (United States) Billie Jean King

Men's doubles
- (Australia) John Newcombe / (Australia) Tony Roche

Women's doubles
- (United States) Rosie Casals / (United States) Billie Jean King

Mixed doubles
- (United States) Billie Jean King / (Australia) Owen Davidson
- U.S. National Championships

The 1967 U.S. National Championships (now known as the US Open) was a tennis tournament that took place on the outdoor grass courts at the West Side Tennis Club, Forest Hills in New York City, New York. The tournament ran from August 30 through September 10, 1967. It was the 87th staging of the U.S. National Championships, and the fourth Grand Slam tennis event of 1967. This was the last time the U.S. National Championship was played as an amateur event; the 1968 tournament, also played at West Side Tennis Club's Forest Hills Stadium, became the first U.S.Open, following the French and Wimbledon opens earlier that year.

The three doubles tournaments took place at the Longwood Cricket Club in Brookline, Massachusetts, from August 21 to 29, 1967.

== Finals ==
=== Men's singles ===
(Australia) John Newcombe defeated (United States) Clark Graebner 6–4, 6–4, 8–6

=== Women's singles ===
(United States) Billie Jean King defeated (United Kingdom) Ann Haydon Jones 11–9, 6–4

=== Men's doubles ===
(Australia) John Newcombe / (Australia) Tony Roche defeated (Australia) William Bowrey / (Australia) Owen Davidson 6–8, 9–7, 6–3, 6–3

=== Women's doubles ===
(United States) Rosie Casals / (United States) Billie Jean King defeated (United States) Mary-Ann Eisel / (United States) Donna Floyd, 4–6, 6–3, 6–4

=== Mixed doubles ===
(United States) Billie Jean King / (Australia) Owen Davidson defeated (United States) Rosie Casals / (United States) Stan Smith 6–3, 6–2

Preceded by 1967 Wimbledon Championships	Grand Slams	Succeeded by 1968 Australian Championships
