= 1965 U.S. National Championships (tennis) =

- Date: 1 September – 12 September
- Edition: 85th
- Category: Grand Slam (ITF)
- Surface: Grass
- Location: Forest Hills, Queens; New York City, New York
- Venue: West Side Tennis Club

Champions

Men's singles
- (Spain) Manuel Santana

Women's singles
- (Australia) Margaret Smith

Men's doubles
- (Australia) Roy Emerson / (Australia) Fred Stolle

Women's doubles
- (United States) Carole Caldwell Graebner / (United States) Nancy Richey

Mixed doubles
- (Australia) Margaret Smith / (Australia) Fred Stolle
- U.S. National Championships

The 1965 U.S. National Championships (now known as the US Open) was a tennis tournament that took place on the outdoor grass courts at the West Side Tennis Club, Forest Hills in New York City, New York. The tournament ran from 1 September until 12 September. It was the 85th staging of the U.S. National Championships, and the fourth Grand Slam tennis event of 1965.

== Finals ==
=== Men's singles ===
(Spain) Manuel Santana defeated (South Africa) Cliff Drysdale 6–2, 7–9, 7–5, 6–1

=== Women's singles ===
(Australia) Margaret Smith defeated (United States) Billie Jean Moffitt 8–6, 7–5

=== Men's doubles ===
(Australia) Roy Emerson / (Australia) Fred Stolle defeated (United States) Frank Froehling / (United States) Charles Pasarell 6–4, 10–12, 7–5, 6–3

=== Women's doubles ===
(United States) Carole Graebner / (United States) Nancy Richey defeated (United States) Billie Jean Moffitt / (United States) Karen Susman 6–4, 6–4

=== Mixed doubles ===
(Australia) Margaret Smith / (Australia) Fred Stolle defeated (Australia) Judy Tegart / (United States) Frank Froehling 6–2, 6–2

Preceded by 1965 Wimbledon Championships	Grand Slams	Succeeded by 1966 Australian Championships
