= 1966 U.S. National Championships (tennis) =

- Date: September 1–11
- Edition: 86th
- Category: Grand Slam (ITF)
- Surface: Grass
- Location: Forest Hills, Queens; New York City, New York
- Venue: West Side Tennis Club

Champions

Men's singles
- (Australia) Fred Stolle

Women's singles
- (Brazil) Maria Bueno

Men's doubles
- (Australia) Roy Emerson / (Australia) Fred Stolle

Women's doubles
- (Brazil) Maria Bueno / (United States) Nancy Richey

Mixed doubles
- (United States) Donna Floyd / (Australia) Owen Davidson
- U.S. National Championships

The 1966 U.S. National Championships (now known as the US Open) was a tennis tournament that took place on the outdoor grass courts at the West Side Tennis Club, Forest Hills in New York City, New York. The tournament ran from 1 September until 11 September. It was the 86th staging of the U.S. National Championships, and the fourth Grand Slam tennis event of 1966. Fred Stolle and Maria Bueno won the singles titles.

== Finals ==
=== Men's singles ===
(Australia) Fred Stolle defeated (Australia) John Newcombe 4–6, 12–10, 6–3, 6–4

=== Women's singles ===
(Brazil) Maria Bueno defeated (United States) Nancy Richey 6–3, 6–1

=== Men's doubles ===
(Australia) Roy Emerson / (Australia) Fred Stolle defeated (United States) Clark Graebner / (United States) Dennis Ralston 6–4, 6–4, 6–4

=== Women's doubles ===
(Brazil) Maria Bueno / (United States) Nancy Richey defeated (United States) Rosie Casals / (United States) Billie Jean King 6–3, 6–4

=== Mixed doubles ===
(United States) Donna Floyd-Fales / (Australia) Owen Davidson defeated (United States) Carol Hanks Aucamp / (United States) Ed Rubinoff 6–1, 6–3

Preceded by 1966 Wimbledon Championships	Grand Slams	Succeeded by 1967 Australian Championships
