= Tico Carrero =

Puerto Rican former professional tennis player

- Full name: Alberto Carrero Tellado
- Country (sports): Puerto Rico
- Born: September 4, 1948 (age 76); Santurce, Puerto Rico

Singles

Grand Slam singles results
- US Open: 3R (1966)
Medal record
Central American and Caribbean Games
Silver medal – second place	1966 San Juan	Men's doubles

Alberto "Tico" Carrero Tellado (born September 4, 1948) is a Puerto Rican former professional tennis player.

Carrero, a native of San Juan, represented Puerto Rico in the demonstration event at the 1968 Summer Olympics and was a quarter-finalist in doubles. He also represented the territory at the 1963 Pan American Games and 1966 Central American and Caribbean Games, earning a doubles silver medal in the latter.

From 1968 to 1971 he played collegiate tennis while studying civil engineering at Rice University.
