= 1976 Western Championships =

- Date: July 12–18
- Edition: 76th
- Category: Grand Prix Circuit (Three star)
- Draw: 64S / 32D
- Prize money: $100,000
- Surface: Clay / outdoor
- Location: Cincinnati, Ohio, US
- Venue: Old Coney

Champions

Singles
- (United States) Roscoe Tanner

Doubles
- (United States) Stan Smith / (United States) Erik van Dillen
← 1975 ·	Cincinnati Open	· 1977 →

The 1976 Western Championships, also known as Cincinnati Open, was a men's tennis tournament played on outdoor clay courts at the Sunlite Swim and Tennis Club at Old Coney in Cincinnati, Ohio in the United States. It was the 76th edition of the tournament and was part of the Three Star category of the 1976 Commercial Union Assurance Grand Prix circuit. The tournament was held from July 12 through July 18, 1976. Second-seeded Roscoe Tanner won the singles title.

== Finals ==
=== Singles ===
(United States) Roscoe Tanner defeated (United States) Eddie Dibbs 7–6, 6–3

- It was Tanner's 1st singles title of the year and the 5th of his career.

=== Doubles ===
(United States) Stan Smith / (United States) Erik van Dillen defeated (United States) Eddie Dibbs / (United States) Harold Solomon 6–1, 6–1
