= Ruth Riese =

American tennis player

Personal information
- Birth name: Ruth F. Smith
- Nationality: American
- Born: November 15, 1891; Romeo, Michigan
- Died: July 30, 1972 (aged 80); Michigan
- Spouse: Alfred F. Riese (m. 1917)

Sport
- Sport: Tennis

Ruth F. Riese (née Smith, November 15, 1891 - July 30, 1972) of Saginaw, Michigan, was an American amateur tennis player in the 1920s.

== Personal life ==
Ruth F. Smith was born on November 15, 1891, in Romeo, Michigan. She married Alfred Frederick Riese (1888-1986) on June 26, 1917. She died in Michigan on July 30, 1972, and her last residence was in Saginaw.

== Tennis career ==
At the Tri-State Tennis Tournament (currently Cincinnati Open), in Cincinnati, Riese reached six finals, three each in singles and doubles. She was singles runner-up in 1929, 1930 & 1931, and was a doubles finalist in 1927, 1928 and 1930.

She won the Michigan State Championship in women's doubles in 1924. She also reached the singles finals at the Illinois State Championships in 1927 & 1926; was the doubles winner (with Marian Leighton) and a singles semifinalist at the 1927 Western Tennis Championships; won the singles title and was a finalist in doubles at the 1927 Ohio State Championships; paired with Clara Louise Zinke to win the 1927 Michigan State doubles title; and won the doubles title (with Leighton) at the 1928 Western Tennis Championships.
