= 1974 Western Championships =

- Date: July 31 – August 4
- Edition: 74th (Note: It was the 87th edition of the Western Tennis Championships.)
- Category: Grand Prix (Group C)
- Draw: 32S / 16D
- Prize money: $30,000
- Surface: Carpet / indoor
- Location: Cincinnati, Ohio, US
- Venue: Cincinnati Convention Center

Champions

Singles
- (United States) Marty Riessen

Doubles
- (United States) Dick Dell / (United States) Sherwood Stewart
← 1973 ·	Cincinnati Open	· 1975 →

The 1974 Western Championships, also known as the Cincinnati Open, was a men's tennis tournament played on indoor carpet courts at the Cincinnati Convention Center in Cincinnati, Ohio in the United States that was part of the 1974 Commercial Union Assurance Grand Prix. The tournament was held from July 31 until August 4, 1974. It was the only time in the history of the tournament to date that it was played indoor. For the first time since 1919 the tournament did not organize a women's competition. First-seeded Marty Riessen won the singles title and earned $8,000 first-prize money. It was his third singles title at the Cincinnati Open and his first at the Western Championships after five previous losses in the final.

== Finals ==
=== Singles ===
(United States) Marty Riessen defeated (United States) Robert Lutz 7–6^{(8–6)}, 7–6^{(7–5)}

- It was Riessen's only singles title of the year and the 7th of his career during the Open Era.

=== Doubles ===
(United States) Dick Dell / (United States) Sherwood Stewart defeated (United States) Jim Delaney / (United States) John Whitlinger 4–6, 7–6, 6–2
