= 1969 Western Championships =

- Date: July 14–21
- Edition: 69th
- Draw: 96S / 32D
- Prize money: $17,000
- Surface: Clay / outdoor
- Location: Cincinnati, Ohio, U.S.
- Venue: Cincinnati Tennis Club

Champions

Men's singles
- (United States) Cliff Richey

Women's singles
- (Australia) Lesley Turner Bowrey

Men's doubles
- (United States) Bob Lutz / (United States) Stan Smith

Women's doubles
- (Australia) Kerry Harris / (United States) Valerie Ziegenfuss
- Cincinnati Open

The 1969 Western Championships, also known as the Cincinnati Open, was a tennis tournament played on outdoor clay courts at the Cincinnati Tennis Club in Cincinnati, Ohio in the United States. The tournament was held from July 14 through July 21, 1969. Due to bad weather three of the four finals were rescheduled from Sunday to Monday. The women's doubles final was played on Sunday but was moved indoors. Third-seeded Cliff Richey won the men's singles title, his third at the event after 1965–66, and the accompanying $5,000 first-prize money. Lesley Turner Bowrey won the women's singles title after saving eight match points in the final and earned $500 first-prize money.

== Finals ==
=== Men's singles ===
(United States) Cliff Richey defeated (Australia) Allan Stone 6–1, 6–2

=== Women's singles ===
(Australia) Lesley Turner Bowrey defeated (France) Gail Chanfreau 1–6, 7–5, 10–10 ret.

=== Men's doubles ===
(United States) Bob Lutz / (United States) Stan Smith defeated (United States) Arthur Ashe / (United States) Charlie Pasarell 6–3, 6–4

=== Women's doubles ===
(Australia) Kerry Harris / (United States) Valerie Ziegenfuss defeated (United States) Emilie Burrer / (United States) Pam Richmond 6–3, 9–7

== See also ==
- Western Championships
