= Olga Strashun Weil =

American tennis player and golfer

- Born: Olga Strasgun; December 26, 1903; Ohio, U.S.
- Died: August 5, 1963 (aged 59)
- Occupations: Amateur tennis and golf player
- Known for: Playing golf and tennis

Olga Strashun Weil (December 26, 1903 – August 5, 1963) was an American amateur tennis player and golfer in the early to mid-20th century.

== Career ==
Strashun Weil was the daughter of Aaron Strashun, MD, and Amanda Frank Strashun of Cincinnati, Ohio.

Strashun Weil attended the University of Cincinnati where she played tennis and captained the basketball team. In 1924, she was the "C-Ring Award" recipient, presented annually to a top female athlete at that school. During this timespan, she also had much success other notable sporting events. She consistently played the Cincinnati Open and the Ohio State singles championship while in college; she was singles finalist in 1922 at both tournaments. In 1924, and she won the singles titles of each. In addition, at the 1923 and 1924 Ohio State singles championships she won the mixed doubles titles, both times with Louis Kuhler.

After college, In 1926 she was again finalist for the Ohio State singles championships. Strashun Weil was ranked No. 1 in doubles and No. 4 in singles in the United States Tennis Association's Western Section in 1926. She also paired with Clara Louise Zinke to win the doubles title in 1927. She also paired with Zinke to reach the doubles final of the 1927 Western Tennis Championship.

Strashun Weil was also a talented golfer. In 1936, she won her third Ohio Amateur golf title. She also was a finalist in the 1941 Women's Western Open, one of the top tournaments in the world, falling to Patty Berg in match play competition in the final match, 7 & 6.

== Personal life ==
She and her husband, Burt Weil, lived at one point in the North Avondale section of Cincinnati.

== Awards and honors ==
- In 1924, she was the "C-Ring Award" recipient, presented annually to a top female athlete at that school.
- Over her lifetime, she was also elected to the University of Cincinnati's Athletic Hall of Fame.
