= William McElroy =

William McElroy may refer to:

- William D. McElroy (1917–1999), American biochemist and academic administrator
- William S. McEllroy (1893–1981), tennis player
