= Marjorie Dodd =

American tennis player and golfer

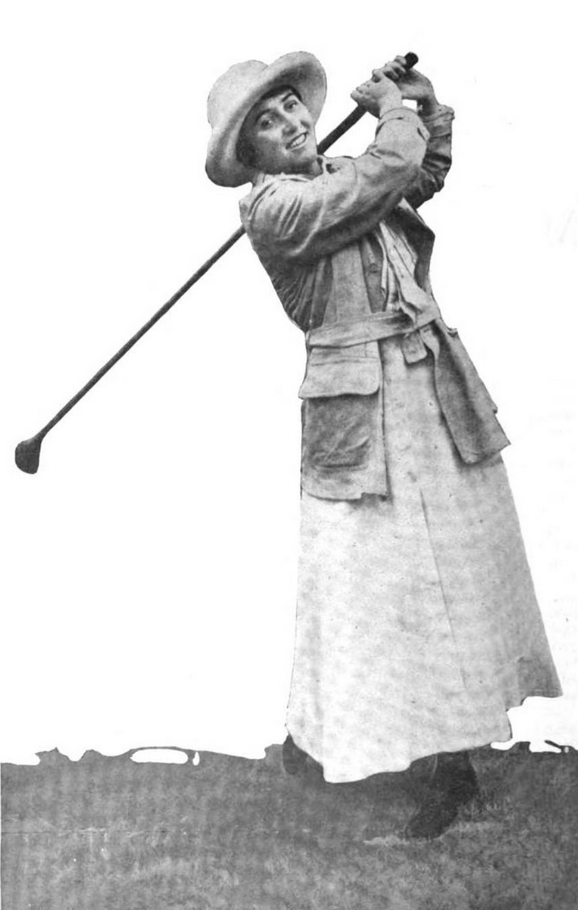
- Marjorie Dodd Letts, from a 1916 publication
- Born: January 14, 1889; Cincinnati, Ohio, U.S.
- Died: August 1968; Du Page, Illinois, U.S.
- Occupation(s): Tennis player and golfer

Marjorie Dodd Letts (January 14, 1889– August 1968) was an important amateur tennis player and golfer in the early part of the 20th century.

== Career ==
=== Tennis ===
Playing at a time when there were no women's rankings, she was nonetheless one of the best ever to come out of the Midwest Section of the United States Tennis Association (known then as the Western Section). At the Cincinnati Masters, Dodd appeared in eight finals, winning singles titles in 1911 & 1912, and reaching the singles finals in 1908 & 1913. She won doubles titles in 1908 (with Martha Kinsey) and 1906 (with May Sutton) and was a doubles finalist in 1913. She also was a mixed doubles finalist (with Robert LeRoy) in 1907.

=== Golf ===
After her notable tennis career, she switched to golf, winning the Women's Western Golf Championships three times (1916, 1917, and 1920) and reaching the finals in 1910 and 1919. One of her most notable victories came in the 1921 U.S. Women's Amateur Championship when she defeated Cecil Leitch, called by The New York Times "the greatest golfing woman the world has ever seen." She also won two Chicago team championships with Mrs. Melvin Jones of Olympia Fields, Illinois.

Dodd Letts also served in 1915 as a director of the Women's Western Golf Association playing out of the Cincinnati Golf Club.

== Personal life ==
Dodd married Frederick Clayton Letts, Jr., on February 5, 1916, and the couple divorced on November 12, 1930. She died in 1968, in DuPage County, Illinois.

== Sources ==
- From Club Court to Center Court by Phillip S. Smith (2008 Edition; ISBN 978-0-9712445-7-3)
- New York Times, October 6, 1921
- Massillon, Ohio, Evening Independent Newspaper, Thursday, November 13, 1930 (page five)
- Golf Illustrated, August, 1924
