= Cincinnati Open =

American tennis tournament

Coordinates: 39.348934°N 84.27711°W

Tournament information
- Founded: 1899; 127 years ago
- Location: Mason, Ohio; United States
- Venue: Lindner Family Tennis Center (1979–current)
- Surface: Clay 1899–1978; Hard (since 1979)
- Website: cincinnatiopen.com

Current champions (2026)
- Men's singles: (France) Arthur Fils
- Women's singles: (United States) Coco Gauff
- Men's doubles: (Brazil) Orlando Luz (Brazil) Rafael Matos
- Women's doubles: (Czech Republic) Marie Bouzková (Czech Republic) Linda Nosková
ATP Tour
- Category: ATP Masters 1000
- Draw: 96S / 48Q / 32D
- Prize money: US$9,415,725 (2026)
WTA Tour
- Category: WTA 1000
- Draw: 96S / 48Q / 32D
- Prize money: US$7,433,076 (2026)

The Cincinnati Open is an annual professional tennis event held in suburban Cincinnati, United States. It is played on outdoor hard courts at the Lindner Family Tennis Center in Mason, Ohio, and is held in August. The event started on September 18, 1899, and is the oldest tennis tournament in the United States still played in (or near) its original city. It also is the third largest tennis event in the United States, after the US Open and the Indian Wells Open. It is one of the ATP Masters 1000 tournaments on the ATP Tour, and one of the WTA 1000 tournaments on the WTA Tour.

== History ==
The tournament was started in 1899 as the Cincinnati Open and was renamed in 1901 to Tri-State Tennis Tournament, a name it would keep until 1969 (it would later be known by several other names, including ATP Championships), and would eventually grow into the tournament now held in Mason. The original tournament was held at the Avondale Athletic Club, which sat on property that is now Xavier University, and would later be moved to various locations due to changes in tournament management and surfaces. The first tournament in 1899 was played on clay courts (described in a newspaper article of the time as "crushed brick dust"), and the event was mostly played on clay until 1979 when it switched to hardcourts.

In 1903, the tournament was moved to the Cincinnati Tennis Club, where it was primarily held until 1972. In 1974, the tournament was nearly dropped from the tennis calendar but moved at the last moment to the Cincinnati Convention Center, where it was played indoors and, for the first time since 1919, without a women's draw. In 1975, the tournament moved to the Coney Island amusement park on the Ohio River, and the tournament began to gain momentum again under the new leadership of Paul Flory, then an executive at Proctor & Gamble.

In 1979 the tournament moved to Mason where a permanent stadium was built and the surface was changed from Har-Tru clay to hardcourt (DecoTurf II.). The event also moved its date, changing from one week after Wimbledon to two weeks before the US Open, a significantly more desirable time slot. Later, two other permanent stadia were constructed, making Cincinnati the only tennis tournament outside the four Grand Slam events with three stadium courts – Center Court, Grandstand Court and Court 3. A new Court 3 was built in 2010, increasing the number of stadium courts to four, with the existing Court 3 renamed Court 9. The women's competition was reinstated in 1988 for one year, and then again in 2004 when the organizers, with the help of the Octagon sports agency, bought the Croatian Bol Ladies Open and moved it to Cincinnati.

Between 1981 and 1989 it was a major tournament on the men's Grand Prix Tennis Tour and part of the Grand Prix Super Series.

In 2002, the tournament was sponsored for the first time by Western & Southern Financial Group. In August 2008, the men's tournament was sold to the United States Tennis Association, the owners of the US Open. In 2011 the men's and women's tournaments were played in the same week, and the name changed from the "Western & Southern Financial Group Masters and Women's Open" to the "Western & Southern Open".

In 2022, the tournament was sold by the USTA to Ben Navarro's Beemok Capital; in 2023, the tournament proposed an additional $22.5 million in state funding to help cover a proposed $150 million expansion to the Lindner Family Tennis Center, which included plans for the Cincinnati Open to expand to a 12-day format with a 96-player draw and add additional programming. In May 2023, rumors emerged that Beemok was considering relocating the tournament to a proposed $400 million tennis complex in Charlotte, North Carolina. Beemok denied that relocation was being considered, stating, "We've had productive conversations with state and local representatives in Mason and the surrounding area and have made considerable efforts to develop a potential master plan to expand the event in its current location." In June 2023, the city proposed a $15 million commitment and other economic incentives to keep the tournament in Mason, while State Senator Steve Wilson proposed a $25 million contribution and a $1 billion "super-capital improvement fund" for a state budget proposal.

In October 2023, Beemok announced that the tournament would remain in Mason and expand to a 12-day format for 2025, with both draws expanding from 56 to 96 players. With the changes, Western & Southern exited its title sponsorship agreement, and the tournament returned to the "Cincinnati Open" name. The tournament also changed its sponsorship model to incorporate six "cornerstone" sponsors—including Western & Southern, Credit One Bank, Fifth Third Bank, Great American Insurance Group, Kroger, and Procter & Gamble—which would have activations and branding across the tournament.

== Venue ==
The tournament is played at the Lindner Family Tennis Center, located in the Cincinnati suburb of Mason, Ohio. It features a total of 31 courts, including five permanent stadiums – Center Court, Grandstand Court, Champions Court, Stadium 3, and Court 10. It is among a few venues (e.g. the Madrid Open) other than Grand Slams with more than two permanent stadiums.

Stadium	Constructed	Capacity
Center Court	1981	11,600
Grandstand Court	1995	5,000
Champions Court	2025	2,300
Stadium 3	2010	4,000
Court 10	1997	2,000

In 2009, the tennis tournament announced a $10 million upgrade to the facility, including the construction of a 52,000-square-foot (4,800 m^{2}) West Building to add space for players, media and fans. The new building, which opened in mid-2010 and is named the Paul M. Flory Player Center, is approximately twice as high as the previous West Building, rising 85 feet (26 m) above ground level and 97 feet (30 m) above the court level.

In 2010, the tournament announced plans to expand the grounds by more than 40% and add six new courts. One of those courts is Court 3, which serves as the third television court, while another court has seating for 2,500. A new ticket office, entry plaza, food court and exhibit areas also were added.

In June 2020, due to the COVID-19 pandemic, the tournament temporarily relocated to the Billie Jean King National Tennis Center in New York City to reduce unnecessary player travel by centralizing the tournament and the U.S. Open at one venue.

The venue hosts additional events including the Atlantic 10 Conference Tennis Championships, the Ohio Athletic Conference Tennis Championships, and both the boys' and girls' OHSAA state tennis championships, and has hosted an Association of Volleyball Professionals event, concerts, charitable events, and numerous regional and national junior tennis events.

Because of intentional design choices for the Lindner Family Tennis Center, the Cincinnati Open is known as one of the more intimate environments for player-fan interaction. The layout of the facility promotes fan interaction as players walk from court to court among the fans.

== Past finals ==
=== Men's singles ===
Year	Champions	Runners-up	Score
1899	(United States) Nat Emerson (1/1)	(United States) Dudley Sutphin	8–6, 6–1, 10–8
1900	(United States) Raymond D. Little (1/3)	(United States) Nat Emerson	6–2 6–4 6–2
1901	(United States) Raymond D. Little (2/3)	(United States) Kreigh Collins	2–6, 8–6, 6–4, 7–5
1902	(United States) Raymond D. Little (3/3)	(United States) Kreigh Collins	3–6, 6–8, 6–4, 6–1, 6–2
1903	(United States) Kreigh Collins (1/1)	(United States) Raymond D. Little	11–9, 4–6, 6–1, 3–6, 6–4
1904	(United States) Beals Wright (1/3)	(United States) L. Harry Waidner	7–5, 6–0, 6–3
1905	(United States) Beals Wright (2/3)	(United States) Kreigh Collins	6–3, 7–5, 4–6, 7–9, 6–3
1906	(United States) Beals Wright (3/3)	(United States) Robert LeRoy	6–4, 6–4, 4–6, 4–6, 6–2
1907	(United States) Robert LeRoy (1/3)	(United States) Robert Chauncey Seaver	8–6, 6–8, 6–2, 6–0
1908	(United States) Robert LeRoy (2/3)	(United States) Nat Emerson	6–0, 7–5, 6–4
1909	(United States) Robert LeRoy (3/3)	(United States) Nat Emerson	6–3, 3–6, 6–0, 1–6, 6–3
1910	(United States) Richard H. Palmer (1/2)	(United States) Wallace F. Johnson	11–9, 6–3, 6–4
1911	(United States) Richard H. Palmer (2/2)	(United States) Richard Bishop	14–12, 6–4, 8–6
1912	(United States) Gus Touchard (1/1)	(United States) Richard H. Palmer	6–1, 6–2, 7–5
1913	(United States) William S. McEllroy (1/2)	(United States) Gus Touchard	default
1914	(United States) William S. McEllroy (2/2)	(United States) William Hoag	6–4, 1–6, 6–4, 6–2
1915	(United States) Clarence Griffin (1/1)	(United States) William S. McEllroy	6–4, 6–3, 6–3
1916	(United States) Bill Johnston (1/1)	(United States) Clarence Griffin	default
1917	(United States) Fritz Bastian (1/2)	(United States) John G. MacKay	4–6, 6–4, 6–1, 6–2
1918	Tournament suspended due to World War I		
1919	(United States) Fritz Bastian (2/2)	(United States) John Hennessey	2–6, 6–4, 6–1, 6–4
1920	(United States) John Hennessey (1/1)	(United States) Walter Wesbrook	8–10, 6–3, 6–3, 6–4
1921	Tournament suspended		
1922	(United States) Louis Kuhler (1/2)	(United States) Edwin Haupt	6–3, 6–1, 6–1
1923	(United States) Louis Kuhler (2/2)	(United States) Paul Kunkel	6–3, 6–3, 6–2
1924	(United States) George Lott (1/4)	(United States) Paul Kunkel	2–6, 13–11, 6–4, 6–3
1925	(United States) George Lott (2/4)	(United States) Julius Sagalowsky	6–3, 7–5, 6–1
1926	(United States) Bill Tilden (1/1)	(United States) George Lott	4–6, 6–3, 7–9, 6–4, 6–3
1927	(United States) George Lott (3/4)	(United States) Emmett Paré	6–4, 6–4, 6–2
1928	(United States) Emmett Paré (1/1)	(United States) Harris Coggeshall	2–6, 6–1, 6–4, 6–4
1929	(United States) Herbert Bowman (1/1)	(United States) Julius Seligson	2–6, 6–4, 6–4, 6–1
1930	(United States) Frank Shields (1/1)	(United States) Emmett Paré	6–2, 6–4, 3–6, 2–6, 6–1
1931	(United States) Cliff Sutter (1/1)	(United States) Bruce Barnes	6–3, 6–2, 3–6, 6–3
1932	(United States) George Lott (4/4)	(United States) Frank Parker	5–7, 6–2, 4–6, 6–0, 6–3
1933	(United States) Bryan Grant (1/2)	(United States) Frank Parker	11–9, 6–2, 1–6, 7–5
1934	(United States) Henry Prusoff (1/1)	(United States) Arthur Hendrix	6–3, 6–2, 4–6, 6–4
1935	Tournament suspended due to the Great Depression		
1936	(United States) Bobby Riggs (1/4)	(United States) Charles Harris	6–1, 6–3, 6–1
1937	(United States) Bobby Riggs (2/4)	(United States) John McDiarmid	6–3, 6–3, 4–6, 6–3
1938	(United States) Bobby Riggs (3/4)	(United States) Frank Parker	6–1, 7–5, 6–3
1939	(United States) Bryan Grant (2/2)	(United States) Frank Parker	4–6, 6–3, 6–1, 2–6, 6–4
1940	(United States) Bobby Riggs (4/4)	(United States) Arthur Marx	11–9, 6–2, 4–6, 6–8, 6–1
1941	(United States) Frank Parker (1/1)	(United States) Bill Talbert	6–2, 6–2, 6–4
1942	(Ecuador) Pancho Segura (1/2)	(United States) Bill Talbert	1–6, 6–2, 6–4, 12–10
1943	(United States) Bill Talbert (1/3)	(United States) Seymour Greenberg	6–1, 6–2, 6–3
1944	(Ecuador) Pancho Segura (2/2)	(United States) William Talbert	9–11, 6–2, 7–5, 2–6, 7–5
1945	(United States) Bill Talbert (2/3)	(United States) Elwood Cooke	6–2, 7–9, 6–2
1946	(United States) Nick Carter (1/1)	(United States) George Richards	6–1, 6–1
1947	(United States) Bill Talbert (3/3)	(United States) George Pero	6–1, 6–0, 6–0
1948	(United States) Herbert Behrens (1/1)	(United States) Irvin Dorfman	7–5, 11–9, 2–6, 6–8, 6–4
1949	(United States) James Brink (1/1)	(United States) Arnold Saul	6–4, 6–8, 6–4, 6–0
1950	(United States) Glenn Bassett (1/1)	(United States) Hamilton Richardson	6–2, 4–6, 6–1, 6–1
1951	(United States) Tony Trabert (1/2)	(United States) William Talbert	5–7, 4–6, 6–4, 6–3, 6–4
1952	(United States) Noel Brown (1/1)	(United States) Fred Hagist	6–4, 0–6, 2–0 ret.
1953	(United States) Tony Trabert (2/2)	(United States) Hamilton Richardson	10–8, 6–3, 6–4
1954	(United States) Straight Clark (1/1)	(United States) Sam Giammalva	8–6, 6–1, 6–1
1955	(United States) Bernard Bartzen (1/3)	(United States) Tony Trabert	7–9, 11–9, 6–4
1956	(United States) Edward Moylan (1/1)	(United States) Bernard Bartzen	6–0, 6–3, 6–3
1957	(United States) Bernard Bartzen (2/3)	(United States) Grant Golden	6–4, 7–5, 6–4
1958	(United States) Bernard Bartzen (3/3)	(United States) Sam Giammalva	7–5, 6–3, 6–2
1959	(United States) Whitney Reed (1/1)	(United States) Donald Dell	1–6, 7–5, 6–3, 6–3
1960	(Ecuador) Miguel Olvera (1/1)	(United States) Crawford Henry	4–6, 9–7, 6–4
1961	(United States) Allen Fox (1/1)	(United States) Billy Lenoir	3–6, 8–6, 6–2, 6–1
1962	(United States) Marty Riessen (1/3)	(United States) Allen Fox	1–6, 6–2, 6–2, 6–3
1963	(United States) Marty Riessen (2/3)	(United States) Herbert Fitzgibbon	6–1, 6–3, 7–5
1964	(United States) Herb Fitzgibbon (1/1)	(Australia) Robert Brien	6–1, 6–3, 6–1
1965	(United States) Billy Lenoir (1/1)	(United States) Herbert Fitzgibbon	1–6, 6–3, 6–3, 9–7
1966	(United States) David Power (1/1)	(United States) William Harris	7–5, 3–6, 0–6, 6–1, 6–2
1967	(Mexico) Joaquín Loyo-Mayo (1/1)	(Chile) Jaime Fillol	8–6, 6–1
1968	(United States) William Harris (1/1)	(United States) Tom Gorman	3–6, 6–2, 6–2
↓ Open era ↓
1969	(United States) Cliff Richey (1/1)	(Australia) Allan Stone	6–1, 6–2
↓ Grand Prix circuit ↓
1970	(Australia) Ken Rosewall (1/1)	(United States) Cliff Richey	7–9, 9–7, 8–6
1971	(United States) Stan Smith (1/1)	(Spain) Juan Gisbert Sr.	7–6, 6–3
1972	(United States) Jimmy Connors (1/1)	(Argentina) Guillermo Vilas	6–3, 6–3
1973	(Romania) Ilie Năstase (1/1)	(Spain) Manuel Orantes	5–7, 6–3, 6–4
1974	(United States) Marty Riessen (3/3)	(United States) Robert Lutz	7–6^{(8–6)}, 7–6^{(7–5)}
1975	(United States) Tom Gorman (1/1)	(United States) Sherwood Stewart	7–5, 2–6, 6–4
1976	(United States) Roscoe Tanner (1/1)	(United States) Eddie Dibbs	7–6, 6–3
1977	(United States) Harold Solomon (1/2)	(United Kingdom) Mark Cox	6–2, 6–3
1978	(United States) Eddie Dibbs (1/1)	(Mexico) Raúl Ramírez	5–7, 6–3, 6–2
1979 (Note: The 1979 men's competition, despite being named the 1979 ATP Championships was a non-Grand Prix event not bringing any ATP ranking points and was run as a rival event to the 1979 U.S. Pro Tennis Championships in Boston.)	(United States) Peter Fleming (1/1)	(United States) Roscoe Tanner	6–4, 6–2
1980	(United States) Harold Solomon (2/2)	(Paraguay) Francisco González	7–6, 6–3
↓ Grand Prix Super Series ↓
1981	(United States) John McEnroe (1/1)	(New Zealand) Chris Lewis	6–3, 6–4
1982	(Czechoslovakia) Ivan Lendl (1/1)	(United States) Steve Denton	6–2, 7–6^{(9–7)}
1983	(Sweden) Mats Wilander (1/4)	(United States) John McEnroe	6–4, 6–4
1984	(Sweden) Mats Wilander (2/4)	(Sweden) Anders Järryd	7–6^{(7–4)}, 6–3
1985	(West Germany) Boris Becker (1/1)	(Sweden) Mats Wilander	6–4, 6–2
1986	(Sweden) Mats Wilander (3/4)	(United States) Jimmy Connors	6–4, 6–1
1987	(Sweden) Stefan Edberg (1/2)	(West Germany) Boris Becker	6–4, 6–1
1988	(Sweden) Mats Wilander (4/4)	(Sweden) Stefan Edberg	3–6, 7–6^{(7–5)}, 7–6^{(7–5)}
1989	(United States) Brad Gilbert (1/1)	(Sweden) Stefan Edberg	6–4, 2–6, 7–6^{(7–5)}
↓ ATP Masters 1000 (Note: Known as Championship Series, Single Week from 1990 till 1995, Super 9 from 1996 till 1999 and Masters Series from 2000 till 2008.) ↓
1990	(Sweden) Stefan Edberg (2/2)	(United States) Brad Gilbert	6–1, 6–1
1991	(France) Guy Forget (1/1)	(United States) Pete Sampras	2–6, 7–6^{(7–4)}, 6–4
1992	(United States) Pete Sampras (1/3)	(United States) Ivan Lendl	6–3, 3–6, 6–3
1993	(United States) Michael Chang (1/2)	(Sweden) Stefan Edberg	7–5, 0–6, 6–4
1994	(United States) Michael Chang (2/2)	(Sweden) Stefan Edberg	6–2, 7–5
1995	(United States) Andre Agassi (1/3)	(United States) Michael Chang	7–5, 6–2
1996	(United States) Andre Agassi (2/3)	(United States) Michael Chang	7–6^{(7–4)}, 6–4
1997	(United States) Pete Sampras (2/3)	(Austria) Thomas Muster	6–3, 6–4
1998	(Australia) Patrick Rafter (1/1)	(United States) Pete Sampras	1–6, 7–6^{(7–2)}, 6–4
1999	(United States) Pete Sampras (3/3)	(Australia) Patrick Rafter	7–6^{(9–7)}, 6–3
2000	(Sweden) Thomas Enqvist (1/1)	(United Kingdom) Tim Henman	7–6^{(7–5)}, 6–4
2001	(Brazil) Gustavo Kuerten (1/1)	(Australia) Patrick Rafter	6–1, 6–3
2002	(Spain) Carlos Moyá (1/1)	(Australia) Lleyton Hewitt	7–5, 7–6^{(7–5)}
2003	(United States) Andy Roddick (1/2)	(United States) Mardy Fish	4–6, 7–6^{(7–3)}, 7–6^{(7–4)}
2004	(United States) Andre Agassi (3/3)	(Australia) Lleyton Hewitt	6–3, 3–6, 6–2
2005	(Switzerland) Roger Federer (1/7)	(United States) Andy Roddick	6–3, 7–5
2006	(United States) Andy Roddick (2/2)	(Spain) Juan Carlos Ferrero	6–3, 6–4
2007	(Switzerland) Roger Federer (2/7)	(United States) James Blake	6–1, 6–4
2008	(United Kingdom) Andy Murray (1/2)	(Serbia) Novak Djokovic	7–6^{(7–4)}, 7–6^{(7–5)}
2009	(Switzerland) Roger Federer (3/7)	(Serbia) Novak Djokovic	6–1, 7–5
2010	(Switzerland) Roger Federer (4/7)	(United States) Mardy Fish	6–7^{(5–7)}, 7–6^{(7–1)}, 6–4
2011	(United Kingdom) Andy Murray (2/2)	(Serbia) Novak Djokovic	6–4, 3–0 ret.
2012	(Switzerland) Roger Federer (5/7)	(Serbia) Novak Djokovic	6–0, 7–6^{(9–7)}
2013	(Spain) Rafael Nadal (1/1)	(United States) John Isner	7–6^{(10–8)}, 7–6^{(7–3)}
2014	(Switzerland) Roger Federer (6/7)	(Spain) David Ferrer	6–3, 1–6, 6–2
2015	(Switzerland) Roger Federer (7/7)	(Serbia) Novak Djokovic	7–6^{(7–1)}, 6–3
2016	(Croatia) Marin Čilić (1/1)	(United Kingdom) Andy Murray	6–4, 7–5
2017	(Bulgaria) Grigor Dimitrov (1/1)	(Australia) Nick Kyrgios	6–3, 7–5
2018	(Serbia) Novak Djokovic (1/3)	(Switzerland) Roger Federer	6–4, 6–4
2019	(Russia) Daniil Medvedev (1/1)	(Belgium) David Goffin	7–6^{(7–3)}, 6–4
2020	(Serbia) Novak Djokovic (2/3)	(Canada) Milos Raonic	1–6, 6–3, 6–4
2021	(Germany) Alexander Zverev (1/1)	(Russia) Andrey Rublev	6–2, 6–3
2022	(Croatia) Borna Ćorić (1/1)	(Greece) Stefanos Tsitsipas	7–6^{(7–0)}, 6–2
2023	(Serbia) Novak Djokovic (3/3)	(Spain) Carlos Alcaraz	5–7, 7–6^{(9–7)}, 7–6^{(7–4)}
2024	(Italy) Jannik Sinner (1/1)	(United States) Frances Tiafoe	7–6^{(7–4)}, 6–2
2025	(Spain) Carlos Alcaraz (1/1)	(Italy) Jannik Sinner	5–0 ret.
2026	(France) Arthur Fils (1/1)	(United States) Frances Tiafoe	6–3, 1–6, 6–0

=== Women's singles ===
Year	Champions	Runners-up	Score
1899	(United States) Myrtle McAteer (1/3)	(United States) Juliette Atkinson	7–5, 6–1, 4–6, 8–6
1900	(United States) Myrtle McAteer (2/3)	(United States) Maud Banks	6–4, 6–8, 6–2, 6–3
1901	(United States) Winona Closterman (1/2)	(United States) Juliette Atkinson	6–2, 8–6, 6–1
1902	(United States) Maud Banks (1/1)	(United States) Winona Closterman	6–2, 6–1
1903	(United States) Winona Closterman (2/2)	(United States) Myrtle McAteer	6–1, 5–7, 6–4
1904	(United States) Myrtle McAteer (3/3)	(United States) Winona Closterman	7–5, 6–3
1905	(United States) May Sutton (1/3)	(United States) Myrtle McAteer	6–0, 6–0
1906	(United States) May Sutton (2/3)	(United States) Florence Sutton	7–5, 6–2
1907	(United States) May Sutton (3/3)	(United States) Martha Kinsey	6–1, 6–1
1908	(United States) Martha Kinsey (1/1)	(United States) Marjorie Dodd	4–6, 8–6, 6–2
1909	(United Kingdom) Edith Hannam (1/1)	(United States) Martha Kinsey	6–3, 6–1
1910	(United States) Miriam Steever (1/1)	(Canada) Rhea Fairbairn	4–6, 8–6, 6–0
1911	(United States) Marjorie Dodd (1/2)	(United States) Helen McLaughlin	6–0, 6–2
1912	(United States) Marjorie Dodd (2/2)	(United States) May Sutton	default
1913	(United States) Ruth Sanders (1/5)	(United States) Marjorie Dodd	6–2, 6–3
1914	(United States) Ruth Sanders (2/5)	(United States) Katharine Brown	7–5, 5–7, 6–2
1915	(Norway) Molla Bjurstedt (1/1)	(United States) Ruth Sanders	6–0, 6–4
1916	(United States) Martha Guthrie (1/1)	(United States) Marguerite Davis	6–2, 2–6, 6–1
1917	(United States) Katharine Brown (1/1)	(United States) Mrs. Willis Adams	7–5, 0–6, 6–4
1918	Not contested		
1919	Not contested		
1920	(United States) Ruth Sanders Cordes (3/5)	(United States) Ruth King	6–1, 6–0
1921	Tournament suspended		
1922	(United States) Ruth Sanders Cordes (4/5)	(United States) Olga Strashun	6–3, 6–4
1923	(United States) Ruth Sanders Cordes (5/5)	(United States) Clara Louise Zinke	6–0, 7–5
1924	(United States) Olga Strashun (1/1)	(United States) Clara Louise Zinke	6–4, 6–2
1925	(United States) Marian Leighton (1/1)	(United States) Clara Louise Zinke	6–3, 6–2
1926	(United States) Clara Louise Zinke (1/5)	(United States) Olga Strashun Weil	6–2, 6–2
1927	(United States) Clara Louise Zinke (2/5)	(United States) Marian Leighton	6–4, 4–6, 4–1 ret.
1928	(United States) Marjorie Gladman (1/1)	(United States) Clara Louise Zinke	6–4, 6–4
1929	(United States) Clara Louise Zinke (3/5)	(United States) Ruth Riese	6–2, 6–3
1930	(United States) Clara Louise Zinke (4/5)	(United States) Ruth Riese	6–2, 6–4
1931	(United States) Clara Louise Zinke (5/5)	(United States) Ruth Riese	6–1, 6–1
1932	(United States) Dorothy Weisel Hack (1/1)	(United States) Clara Louise Zinke	6–1, 6–0
1933	(United States) Muriel Adams (1/1)	(United States) Helen Fulton	6–4, 6–4
1934	(United States) Gracyn Wheeler (1/1)	(United States) Esther Bartosh	default
1935	Tournament suspended due to the Great Depression		
1936	(United States) Lila Porter (1/1)	(United States) Virginia Hollinger	6–4, 6–3
1937	(United States) Virginia Hollinger (1/2)	(United States) Monica Nolan	6–3, 6–2
1938	(United States) Virginia Hollinger (2/2)	(United States) Margaret Jessee	8–6, 1–6, 6–0
1939	(United States) Catherine Wolf (1/2)	(United States) Virginia Hollinger	6–2, 6–3
1940	(United States) Alice Marble (1/1)	(United States) Gracyn Wheeler	6–3, 6–4
1941	(United States) Pauline Betz (1/3)	(United States) Mary Arnold	6–4, 6–3
1942	(United States) Catherine Wolf (2/2)	(United States) Monica Nolan	6–4, 6–1
1943	(United States) Pauline Betz (2/3)	(United States) Catherine Wolf	6–0, 6–2
1944	(United States) Dorothy Cheney (1/1)	(United States) Pauline Betz	7–5, 6–4
1945	(United States) Pauline Betz (3/3)	(United States) Dorothy Cheney	6–2, 6–0
1946	(United States) Virginia Kovacs (1/1)	(United States) Shirley Fry	6–4, 6–1
1947	(United States) Betty Rosenquest (1/1)	(United States) Betty Hulbert James	9–7, 6–2
1948	(United States) Dorothy Head Knode (1/1)	(United States) Mercedes Madden Lewis	6–4, 6–4
1949	(Romania) Magda Rurac (1/1)	(United States) Beverly Baker Fleitz	6–4, 2–6, 6–0
1950	(United States) Beverly Baker Fleitz (1/1)	(Romania) Magda Rurac	5–7, 6–3, 9–7
1951	(United States) Pat Canning Todd (1/1)	(Romania) Magda Rurac	6–3, 6–4
1952	(United States) Anita Kanter (1/1)	(United States) Doris Popple	6–0, 6–1
1953	(Australia) Thelma Coyne Long (1/1)	(United States) Anita Kanter	7–5, 6–2
1954	(United States) Lois Felix (1/2)	(United States) Ethel Norton	6–1, 6–3
1955	(United States) Mimi Arnold (1/1)	(United States) Barbara Breit	6–4, 6–3
1956	(Mexico) Yola Ramírez (1/1)	(United States) Mary Ann Mitchell	7–5, 6–1
1957	(United States) Lois Felix (2/2)	(United States) Pat Naud	7–5, 2–6, 7–5
1958	(United States) Gwyn Thomas (1/1)	(Mexico) Martha Hernandez	6–1, 6–2
1959	(United States) Donna Floyd (1/1)	(United States) Carol Hanks	5–7, 6–2, 6–4
1960	(United States) Carol Hanks (1/1)	(United States) Farel Footman	6–2, 4–6, 6–3
1961	(United States) Peachy Kellmeyer (1/1)	(United States) Carole Caldwell Graebner	3–6, 12–10, 7–5
1962	(United States) Julie Heldman (1/1)	(United States) Roberta Alison	6–4, 6–4
1963	(United States) Stephanie DeFina (1/2)	(United States) Jane Bartkowicz	7–5, 6–2
1964	(United States) Jean Danilovich (1/1)	(United States) Alice Tym	6–1, 6–2
1965	(United States) Stephanie DeFina (2/2)	(United States) Roberta Alison	10–8, 5–7, 6–4
1966	(United States) Jane Bartkowicz (1/2)	(United States) Peachy Kellmeyer	6–3, 6–3
1967	(United States) Jane Bartkowicz (2/2)	(United States) Patsy Rippy	6–4, 6–1
1968	(United States) Linda Tuero (1/1)	(United States) Tory Fretz	6–1, 6–2
↓ Open era ↓
1969	(Australia) Lesley Turner Bowrey (1/1)	(France) Gail Chanfreau	1–6, 7–5, 10–10 ret.
1970	(United States) Rosemary Casals (1/1)	(United States) Nancy Richey Gunter	6–3, 6–3
1971	(United Kingdom) Virginia Wade (1/1)	(United States) Linda Tuero	6–3, 6–3
1972	(Australia) Margaret Court (1/1)	(Australia) Evonne Goolagong	3–6, 6–2, 7–5
1973	(Australia) Evonne Goolagong (1/1)	(United States) Chris Evert	6–2, 7–5
1974–1987	Not held		
1988	(United States) Barbara Potter (1/1)	(Canada) Helen Kelesi	6–2, 6–2
1989–2003	Not held		
2004	(United States) Lindsay Davenport (1/1)	(Russia) Vera Zvonareva	6–3, 6–2
2005	(Switzerland) Patty Schnyder (1/1)	(Japan) Akiko Morigami	6–4, 6–0
2006	(Russia) Vera Zvonareva (1/1)	(Slovenia) Katarina Srebotnik	6–2, 6–4
2007	(Russia) Anna Chakvetadze (1/1)	(Japan) Akiko Morigami	6–1, 6–3
2008	(Russia) Nadia Petrova (1/1)	(France) Nathalie Dechy	6–2, 6–1
2009	(Serbia) Jelena Janković (1/1)	(Russia) Dinara Safina	6–4, 6–2
2010	(Belgium) Kim Clijsters (1/1)	(Russia) Maria Sharapova	2–6, 7–6^{(7–4)}, 6–2
2011	(Russia) Maria Sharapova (1/1)	(Serbia) Jelena Janković	4–6, 7–6^{(7–3)}, 6–3
2012	(China) Li Na (1/1)	(Germany) Angelique Kerber	1–6, 6–3, 6–1
2013	(Belarus) Victoria Azarenka (1/2)	(United States) Serena Williams	2–6, 6–2, 7–6^{(8–6)}
2014	(United States) Serena Williams (1/2)	(Serbia) Ana Ivanovic	6–4, 6–1
2015	(United States) Serena Williams (2/2)	(Romania) Simona Halep	6–3, 7–6^{(7–5)}
2016	(Czech Republic) Karolína Plíšková (1/1)	(Germany) Angelique Kerber	6–3, 6–1
2017	(Spain) Garbiñe Muguruza (1/1)	(Romania) Simona Halep	6–1, 6–0
2018	(Netherlands) Kiki Bertens (1/1)	(Romania) Simona Halep	2–6, 7–6^{(8–6)}, 6–2
2019	(United States) Madison Keys (1/1)	(Russia) Svetlana Kuznetsova	7–5, 7–6^{(7–5)}
2020	(Belarus) Victoria Azarenka (2/2)	(Japan) Naomi Osaka	walkover
2021	(Australia) Ashleigh Barty (1/1)	(Switzerland) Jil Teichmann	6–3, 6–1
2022	(France) Caroline Garcia (1/1)	(Czech Republic) Petra Kvitová	6–2, 6–4
2023	(United States) Coco Gauff (1/2)	(Czech Republic) Karolína Muchová	6–3, 6–4
2024	Aryna Sabalenka (1/1)	(United States) Jessica Pegula	6–3, 7–5
2025	(Poland) Iga Świątek (1/1)	(Italy) Jasmine Paolini	7–5, 6–4
2026	(United States) Coco Gauff (2/2)	(United States) Jessica Pegula	6–2, 6–4

=== Men's doubles (Open era) ===
Year	Champions	Runners-up	Score
1969	(United States) Bob Lutz (United States) Stan Smith	(United States) Arthur Ashe (United States) Charlie Pasarell	6–3, 6–4
↓ Grand Prix circuit ↓
1970	(Romania) Ilie Năstase (Romania) Ion Țiriac	(South Africa) Bob Hewitt (South Africa) Frew McMillan	6–3, 6–4
1971	(United States) Stan Smith (2) (United States) Erik van Dillen	(United States) Sandy Mayer (United States) Roscoe Tanner	6–4, 6–4
1972	(South Africa) Bob Hewitt (South Africa) Frew McMillan	(United States) Paul Gerken (Venezuela) Humphrey Hose	7–6, 6–4
1973	(Australia) John Alexander (Australia) Phil Dent	(United States) Brian Gottfried (Mexico) Raúl Ramírez	1–6, 7–6, 7–6
1974	(United States) Dick Dell (United States) Sherwood Stewart	(United States) James Delaney (United States) John Whitlinger	4–6, 7–6, 6–2
1975	(Australia) Phil Dent (2) (South Africa) Cliff Drysdale	(Mexico) Marcelo Lara (Mexico) Joaquín Loyo-Mayo	7–6, 6–4
1976	(United States) Stan Smith (3) (United States) Erik van Dillen (2)	(United States) Eddie Dibbs (United States) Harold Solomon	6–1, 6–1
1977	(Australia) John Alexander (2) (Australia) Phil Dent (3)	(South Africa) Bob Hewitt (United States) Roscoe Tanner	6–3, 7–6
1978	(United States) Gene Mayer (Mexico) Raúl Ramírez	(Egypt) Ismail El Shafei (New Zealand) Brian Fairlie	6–3, 6–3
1979	(United States) Brian Gottfried (Romania) Ilie Năstase (2)	(United States) Bob Lutz (United States) Stan Smith	1–6, 6–3, 7–6
1980	(United States) Bruce Manson (United States) Brian Teacher	(Poland) Wojtek Fibak (Czechoslovakia) Ivan Lendl	6–7, 7–5, 6–4
1981	(United States) John McEnroe (United States) Ferdi Taygan	(United States) Bob Lutz (United States) Stan Smith	7–6, 6–3
1982	(United States) Peter Fleming (United States) John McEnroe (2)	(United States) Steve Denton (Australia) Mark Edmondson	6–2, 6–3
1983	(United States) Victor Amaya (United States) Tim Gullikson	(Brazil) Carlos Kirmayr (Brazil) Cássio Motta	6–4, 6–3
1984	(Paraguay) Francisco González (United States) Matt Mitchell	(United States) Sandy Mayer (Hungary) Balázs Taróczy	4–6, 6–3, 7–6
1985	(Sweden) Stefan Edberg (Sweden) Anders Järryd	(Sweden) Joakim Nyström (Sweden) Mats Wilander	4–6, 6–2, 6–3
1986	(Australia) Mark Kratzmann (Australia) Kim Warwick	(South Africa) Christo Steyn (South Africa) Danie Visser	6–3, 6–4
1987	(United States) Ken Flach (United States) Robert Seguso	(United States) Steve Denton (Australia) John Fitzgerald	7–5, 6–3
1988	(United States) Rick Leach (United States) Jim Pugh	(United States) Jim Grabb (United States) Patrick McEnroe	6–2, 6–4
1989	(United States) Ken Flach (2) (United States) Robert Seguso (2)	(South Africa) Pieter Aldrich (South Africa) Danie Visser	6–4, 6–4
↓ ATP Masters 1000 ↓
1990	(Australia) Darren Cahill (Australia) Mark Kratzmann (2)	(United Kingdom) Neil Broad (South Africa) Gary Muller	7–6, 6–2
1991	(United States) Ken Flach (3) (United States) Robert Seguso (3)	(Canada) Grant Connell (Canada) Glenn Michibata	6–7, 6–4, 7–5
1992	(Australia) Todd Woodbridge (Australia) Mark Woodforde	(United States) Patrick McEnroe (United States) Jonathan Stark	6–3, 1–6, 6–3
1993	(United States) Andre Agassi (Czech Republic) Petr Korda	(Sweden) Stefan Edberg (Sweden) Henrik Holm	7–6, 6–4
1994	(United States) Alex O'Brien (Australia) Sandon Stolle	(South Africa) Wayne Ferreira (Australia) Mark Kratzmann	6–7, 6–3, 6–2
1995	(Australia) Todd Woodbridge (2) (Australia) Mark Woodforde (2)	(The Bahamas) Mark Knowles (Canada) Daniel Nestor	6–2, 3–0 ret.
1996	(The Bahamas) Mark Knowles (Canada) Daniel Nestor	(Australia) Sandon Stolle (Czech Republic) Cyril Suk	3–6, 6–3, 6–4
1997	(Australia) Todd Woodbridge (3) (Australia) Mark Woodforde (3)	(Australia) Mark Philippoussis (Australia) Patrick Rafter	7–6, 4–6, 6–4
1998	(The Bahamas) Mark Knowles (2) (Canada) Daniel Nestor (2)	(France) Olivier Delaître (France) Fabrice Santoro	6–1, 2–1 ret.
1999	(Zimbabwe) Byron Black (Sweden) Jonas Björkman	(Australia) Todd Woodbridge (Australia) Mark Woodforde	6–3, 7–6^{(8–6)}
2000	(Australia) Todd Woodbridge (4) (Australia) Mark Woodforde (4)	(South Africa) Ellis Ferreira (United States) Rick Leach	7–6^{(8–6)}, 6–4
2001	(India) Mahesh Bhupathi (India) Leander Paes	(Czech Republic) Martin Damm (Germany) David Prinosil	7–6^{(7–3)}, 6–3
2002	(United States) James Blake (United States) Todd Martin	(India) Mahesh Bhupathi (Belarus) Max Mirnyi	7–5, 6–3
2003	(United States) Bob Bryan (United States) Mike Bryan	(Australia) Wayne Arthurs (Australia) Paul Hanley	7–5, 7–6^{(7–5)}
2004	(The Bahamas) Mark Knowles (3) (Canada) Daniel Nestor (3)	(Sweden) Jonas Björkman (Australia) Todd Woodbridge	6–2, 3–6, 6–3
2005	(Sweden) Jonas Björkman (2) (Belarus) Max Mirnyi	(Zimbabwe) Wayne Black (Zimbabwe) Kevin Ullyett	7–6^{(7–3)}, 6–2
2006	(Sweden) Jonas Björkman (3) (Belarus) Max Mirnyi (2)	(United States) Bob Bryan (United States) Mike Bryan	3–6, 6–3, [10–7]
2007	(Israel) Jonathan Erlich (Israel) Andy Ram	(United States) Bob Bryan (United States) Mike Bryan	4–6, 6–3, [13–11]
2008	(United States) Bob Bryan (2) (United States) Mike Bryan (2)	(Israel) Jonathan Erlich (Israel) Andy Ram	4–6, 7–6^{(7–2)}, [10–7]
2009	(Canada) Daniel Nestor (4) (Serbia) Nenad Zimonjić	(United States) Bob Bryan (United States) Mike Bryan	3–6, 7–6^{(7–2)}, [15–13]
2010	(United States) Bob Bryan (3) (United States) Mike Bryan (3)	(India) Mahesh Bhupathi (Belarus) Max Mirnyi	6–3, 6–4
2011	(India) Mahesh Bhupathi (2) (India) Leander Paes (2)	(France) Michaël Llodra (Serbia) Nenad Zimonjić	7–6^{(7–4)}, 7–6^{(7–2)}
2012	(Sweden) Robert Lindstedt (Romania) Horia Tecău	(India) Mahesh Bhupathi (India) Rohan Bopanna	6–4, 6–4
2013	(United States) Bob Bryan (4) (United States) Mike Bryan (4)	(Spain) Marcel Granollers (Spain) Marc López	6–4, 4–6, [10–4]
2014	(United States) Bob Bryan (5) (United States) Mike Bryan (5)	(Canada) Vasek Pospisil (United States) Jack Sock	6–3, 6–2
2015	(Canada) Daniel Nestor (5) (France) Édouard Roger-Vasselin	(Poland) Marcin Matkowski (Serbia) Nenad Zimonjić	6–2, 6–2
2016	(Croatia) Ivan Dodig (Brazil) Marcelo Melo	(Netherlands) Jean-Julien Rojer (Romania) Horia Tecău	7–6^{(7–5)}, 6–7^{(5–7)}, [10–6]
2017	(France) Pierre-Hugues Herbert (France) Nicolas Mahut	(United Kingdom) Jamie Murray (Brazil) Bruno Soares	7–6^{(8–6)}, 6–4
2018	(United Kingdom) Jamie Murray (Brazil) Bruno Soares	(Colombia) Juan Sebastián Cabal (Colombia) Robert Farah	4–6, 6–3, [10–6]
2019	(Croatia) Ivan Dodig (2) (Slovakia) Filip Polášek	(Colombia) Juan Sebastián Cabal (Colombia) Robert Farah	4–6, 6–4, [10–6]
2020	(Spain) Pablo Carreño Busta (Australia) Alex de Minaur	(United Kingdom) Jamie Murray (United Kingdom) Neal Skupski	6–2, 7–5
2021	(Spain) Marcel Granollers (Argentina) Horacio Zeballos	(United States) Steve Johnson (United States) Austin Krajicek	7–6^{(7–5)}, 7–6^{(7–5)}
2022	(United States) Rajeev Ram (United Kingdom) Joe Salisbury	(Germany) Tim Pütz (New Zealand) Michael Venus	7–6^{(7–4)}, 7–6^{(7–5)}
2023	(Argentina) Máximo González (Argentina) Andrés Molteni	(United Kingdom) Jamie Murray (New Zealand) Michael Venus	3–6, 6–1, [11–9]
2024	(El Salvador) Marcelo Arévalo (Croatia) Mate Pavić	(United States) Mackenzie McDonald (United States) Alex Michelsen	6–2, 6–4
2025	(Croatia) Nikola Mektić (United States) Rajeev Ram	(Italy) Lorenzo Musetti (Italy) Lorenzo Sonego	4–6, 6–3, [10–5]
2026	(Brazil) Orlando Luz (Brazil) Rafael Matos	(Germany) Constantin Frantzen (Netherlands) Robin Haase	6–4, 3–6, [10–7]

=== Women's doubles (Open era) ===
Year	Champions	Runners-up	Score
1969	(Australia) Kerry Harris (United States) Valerie Ziegenfuss	(United States) Emilie Burrer (United States) Pam Richmond	6–3, 9–7
1970	(United States) Rosie Casals (France) Gail Chanfreau	(Australia) Helen Gourlay (South Africa) Pat Walkden	12–10, 6–1
1971	(Australia) Helen Gourlay (Australia) Kerry Harris (2)	(France) Gail Chanfreau (United Kingdom) Winnie Shaw	6–4, 6–4
1972	(Australia) Margaret Court (Australia) Evonne Goolagong	(South Africa) Brenda Kirk (South Africa) Pat Pretorius	6–4, 6–1
1973	(South Africa) Pat Pretorius (South Africa) Ilana Kloss	(Australia) Evonne Goolagong (Australia) Janet Young	7–6, 3–6, 6–2
1974–1987	not held		
1988	(United States) Beth Herr (United States) Candy Reynolds	(United States) Lindsay Bartlett (Canada) Helen Kelesi	4–6, 7–6^{(11–9)}, 6–1
1989–2003	not held		
2004	(United States) Jill Craybas (Germany) Marlene Weingärtner	(Switzerland) Emmanuelle Gagliardi (Germany) Anna-Lena Grönefeld	7–5, 7–6^{(7–2)}
2005	(United States) Laura Granville (United States) Abigail Spears	(Czech Republic) Květa Peschke (Argentina) María Emilia Salerni	3–6, 6–2, 6–4
2006	(Italy) Maria Elena Camerin (Argentina) Gisela Dulko	(Poland) Marta Domachowska (India) Sania Mirza	6–4, 3–6, 6–2
2007	(United States) Bethanie Mattek (India) Sania Mirza	(Russia) Alina Jidkova (Belarus) Tatiana Poutchek	7–6^{(7–4)}, 7–5
2008	(Russia) Maria Kirilenko (Russia) Nadia Petrova	(Chinese Taipei) Hsieh Su-wei (Russia) Yaroslava Shvedova	6–3, 4–6, [10–8]
2009	(Zimbabwe) Cara Black (United States) Liezel Huber	(Spain) Nuria Llagostera Vives (Spain) María José Martínez Sánchez	6–3, 0–6, [10–2]
2010	(Belarus) Victoria Azarenka (Russia) Maria Kirilenko (2)	(United States) Lisa Raymond (Australia) Rennae Stubbs	7–6^{(7–4)}, 7–6^{(10–8)}
2011	(United States) Vania King (Kazakhstan) Yaroslava Shvedova	(South Africa) Natalie Grandin (Czech Republic) Vladimíra Uhlířová	6–4, 3–6, [11–9]
2012	(Czech Republic) Andrea Hlaváčková (Czech Republic) Lucie Hradecká	(Slovenia) Katarina Srebotnik (China) Zheng Jie	6–1, 6–3
2013	(Chinese Taipei) Hsieh Su-wei (China) Peng Shuai	(Germany) Anna-Lena Grönefeld (Czech Republic) Květa Peschke	2–6, 6–3, [12–10]
2014	(United States) Raquel Kops-Jones (United States) Abigail Spears (2)	(Hungary) Tímea Babos (France) Kristina Mladenovic	6–1, 2–0 ret.
2015	(Chinese Taipei) Chan Hao-ching (Chinese Taipei) Chan Yung-jan	(Australia) Casey Dellacqua (Kazakhstan) Yaroslava Shvedova	7–5, 6–4
2016	(India) Sania Mirza (2) (Czech Republic) Barbora Strýcová	(Switzerland) Martina Hingis (United States) CoCo Vandeweghe	7–5, 6–4
2017	(Chinese Taipei) Chan Yung-jan (2) (Switzerland) Martina Hingis	(Chinese Taipei) Hsieh Su-wei (Romania) Monica Niculescu	4–6, 6–4, [10–7]
2018	(Czech Republic) Lucie Hradecká (2) (Russia) Ekaterina Makarova	(Belgium) Elise Mertens (Netherlands) Demi Schuurs	6–2, 7–5
2019	(Czech Republic) Lucie Hradecká (3) (Slovenia) Andreja Klepač	(Germany) Anna-Lena Grönefeld (Netherlands) Demi Schuurs	6–4, 6–1
2020	(Czech Republic) Květa Peschke (Netherlands) Demi Schuurs	(United States) Nicole Melichar (China) Xu Yifan	6–1, 4–6, [10–4]
2021	(Australia) Samantha Stosur (China) Zhang Shuai	(Canada) Gabriela Dabrowski (Brazil) Luisa Stefani	7–5, 6–3
2022	(Ukraine) Lyudmyla Kichenok (Latvia) Jeļena Ostapenko	(United States) Nicole Melichar-Martinez (Australia) Ellen Perez	7–6^{(7–5)}, 6–3
2023	(United States) Alycia Parks (United States) Taylor Townsend	(United States) Nicole Melichar-Martinez (Australia) Ellen Perez	6–7^{(1–7)}, 6–4, [10–6]
2024	(United States) Asia Muhammad (New Zealand) Erin Routliffe	(Canada) Leylah Fernandez (Kazakhstan) Yulia Putintseva	3–6, 6–1, [10–4]
2025	(Canada) Gabriela Dabrowski (New Zealand) Erin Routliffe (2)	(China) Guo Hanyu; Alexandra Panova	6–4, 6–3
2026	(Czech Republic) Marie Bouzková (Czech Republic) Linda Nosková	(Belgium) Magali Kempen; Alexandra Panova	6–1, 6–2

== Records ==
=== Men's singles ===
Roger Federer has won the most Cincinnati Open titles, and out of eight finals, he possesses seven titles; his last being won in 2015, defeating future three-time champion Novak Djokovic in the final. It was at this tournament, in 2018, that Djokovic became the first player to win the Golden Masters (winning all 9 ATP 1000 tournaments). Djokovic then completed this again in 2020 for the double Golden Masters.

Most titles	(Switzerland) Roger Federer	7
Most finals	(Switzerland) Roger Federer	8
Most finals	(Serbia) Novak Djokovic	8
Most consecutive titles	(United States) Raymond D. Little (1900, 1901, 1902)	3
Most consecutive titles	(United States) Beals Wright (1904, 1905, 1906)	3
Most consecutive titles	(United States) Robert LeRoy (1907, 1908, 1909)	3
Most consecutive titles	(United States) Bobby Riggs (1936, 1937, 1938)	3
Most consecutive finals	(United States) Bill Talbert (1941–1945)	5
Most matches played	(Serbia) Novak Djokovic	58
Most matches won	(Switzerland) Roger Federer	47
Most consecutive matches won	(United States) Bobby Riggs	21
Most editions played	(Switzerland) Roger Federer	17
Most times seeded No. 1 (since 1927)	(Switzerland) Roger Federer	7
Best winning %	(United States) Bryan Grant	100%
Best winning %	(United States) Bobby Riggs	100%
Youngest champion	(Germany) Boris Becker	17y, 8m, 29d (1985)
Oldest champion	(Serbia) Novak Djokovic	36y, 2m, 28d (2023)

Longest final
1948 (64 games)
(United States) Herbert Behrens	7	11	2	6	6
(United States) Irvin Dorfman	5	9	6	8	4

Shortest final
2025 (5 games)
(Spain) Carlos Alcaraz	5
(Italy) Jannik Sinner	0^{r}

=== Women's singles ===
Most titles	(United States) Ruth Sanders Cordes	5
Most titles	(United States) Clara Louise Zinke	5
Most consecutive titles	(United States) May Sutton (1905, 1906, 1907)	3
Most consecutive titles	(United States) Ruth Sanders Cordes (1920, 1922, 1923) (Note: Cordes' titles are considered consecutive since the 1921 edition was suspended.)	3
Most consecutive titles	(United States) Clara Louise Zinke (1929, 1930, 1931)	3
Most consecutive finals	(United States) Clara Louise Zinke (1923–1932)	10
Most times seeded No. 1 (since 1927)	(United States) Pauline Betz	4

=== Men's doubles ===
Most titles	(Canada) Daniel Nestor	5
Most titles	(United States) Bob Bryan	5
Most titles	(United States) Mike Bryan	5

=== Women's doubles ===
Most titles	(United States) Clara Louise Zinke	6
Most consecutive titles	(United States) Martha Kinsey	4
Most consecutive titles	(United States) Clara Louise Zinke	4

=== Overall records ===
- Overall records include combined totals of singles and doubles events:

	Men		Women	
Most titles	(United States) Raymond D. Little	11	(United States) Clara Louise Zinke	12
Most finals	(United States) Bill Talbert	14	(United States) Clara Louise Zinke	18
