= 1971 Western Championships =

- Date: August 2–8
- Edition: 71st
- Category: Grand Prix Circuit
- Draw: 64S / 32D
- Prize money: $30,000
- Surface: Clay / outdoor
- Location: Cincinnati, Ohio, United States
- Venue: Cincinnati Tennis Club

Champions

Men's singles
- (United States) Stan Smith

Women's singles
- (United Kingdom) Virginia Wade

Men's doubles
- (United States) Stan Smith / (United States) Erik van Dillen

Women's doubles
- (Australia) Helen Gourlay / (Australia) Kerry Harris
- Cincinnati Open

The 1971 Western Championships, also known as the Cincinnati Open, was a combined men's and women's tennis tournament played on outdoor clay courts at the Cincinnati Tennis Club in Cincinnati, Ohio in the United States that was part of the 1971 Pepsi-Cola Grand Prix circuit. The tournament was held from August 2 through August 8, 1971. Stan Smith and Virginia Wade won the singles titles.

== Finals ==
=== Men's singles ===
(United States) Stan Smith defeated (Spain) Juan Gisbert, Sr. 7–6, 6–3

=== Women's singles ===
(United Kingdom) Virginia Wade defeated (United States) Linda Tuero 6–3, 6–3

=== Men's doubles ===
(United States) Stan Smith / (United States) Erik van Dillen defeated (United States) Sandy Mayer / (United States) Roscoe Tanner 6–4, 6–4

=== Women's doubles ===
(Australia) Helen Gourlay / (Australia) Kerry Harris defeated (France) Gail Chanfreau / (United Kingdom) Winnie Shaw 6–4, 6–4
