= Margaret Jessee =

American tennis player and a Napa Valley vintner

- Born: November 9, 1921 Sacramento, California, U.S.
- Died: July 27, 2007 (aged 85) St. Helena, California, U.S.

Margaret Jessee Warren (Sacramento, California, 9 November 1921 – St. Helena, California, 27 July 2001) was an American tennis player and a Napa Valley vintner.

In 1938, Jessee won the National 18 and Under doubles title and reached the final in singles, and reached the singles final at Cincinnati, before falling to Virginia Hollinger, 6–2, 6–3. She also won two California State singles titles and two State doubles titles during her career.

Jessee graduated from the University of California at Berkeley in 1943 and married James Cleveland Warren, oldest son of then-California Governor Earl Warren and later Supreme Court justice. In 1989, her children established a tennis scholarship in her name at UC Berkeley.
