= Nat Emerson =

American tennis player (1874–1958)

- Full name: Nathaniel C. Emerson
- Country (sports): United States
- Born: October 25, 1874 Cincinnati, Ohio
- Died: October 25, 1958 (aged 84) Memphis, Tennessee

Grand Slam singles results
- US Open: SF (1908)

Nathaniel C. Emerson (25 October 1874 – 25 October 1958) was a top-ranked American amateur tennis player in the early 20th century.

== Personal life ==
Born in Cincinnati, Ohio on October 25, 1874, to Henry Emerson Jr. & Eleanor Caldwell, he moved to Yakima, Washington by 1911, where he owned an apple orchard. Later he moved to Memphis, Tennessee, where he died on October 25, 1958, his 84th birthday.

== Tennis career ==
He was ranked in the ranked in U.S. tennis top ten (No. 7) in 1908 and in the top 20 in 1909 (No. 17) and 1907 (No. 19). In the national doubles rankings, he was ranked No. 6 in 1908 and No. 9 in 1907.

He was a singles semifinalist at the 1908 U.S. National Championship (now known as the U.S. Open), and a doubles finalist at the U.S. National Championship in 1906 & 1908 (both times with L. Harry Waidner). They lost to future International Tennis Hall of Famers Fred Alexander and Harold Hackett in 1906, and Raymond D. Little and Beals Wright in 1908.

At the Cincinnati Open he:

- Was the first men's singles winner (1899)
- Was a singles finalist in 1908
- Won five doubles titles – 1899 (with Burton Hollister), 1902 & 1903 (with Ernie Diehl), 1907 (with Raymond D. Little), and 1908 (with William P. Hunt).
- Reached the doubles final in 1900 (with Diehl) and 1905 (with Robert Mitchell)
- Still holds the record for most round of 16 appearances all-time at the Cincinnati Masters with 12 (tied with his brother, H. Truxtun Emerson, Novak Djokovic, Roger Federer, and Michael Chang)
- Compiled a 47-11 record in 12 singles appearances
- Defeated Fred Alexander in 1900 semifinals, Edwin P. Fischer in the 1902 quarterfinals, Waidner in the 1909 All-Comers final and the 1903 semifinals, Nathaniel Niles in the 1907 round of 16, Robert Chauncey Seaver in the 1908 All-Comers final, and Richard H. Palmer in the 1909 semifinals.

Also, he was:

- Singles champion at the 1899 & 1900 at the Ohio State Tennis Championship
- Singles champion at the Western Tennis Championship in 1907 & 1908
- Singles champion at the Oregon State Tennis Championship in 1910
- Singles finalist at the Western Tennis Championship in 1905, 1906 and 1909
- Doubles winner of the Western Tennis Championship in 1906 & 1908
- Singles winner of the 1908 Northwestern Championships
- Singles winner and doubles finalist at the 1915 Tennessee State Championships
- Doubles finalist at the Oregon State Tennis Championship in 1910

He was inducted into the Cincinnati Tennis Hall of Fame in 2003, along with six others: Ruth Sanders Cordes, Barry MacKay, Al Bunis, Paul Flory, Kathy Graeter, and Tom Price.

== Sources ==
- From Club Court to Center Court by Phillip S. Smith (2008 Edition; ISBN 978-0-9712445-7-3)
- Wright & Ditson's Tennis Annual (1901 & 1909 Editions)
