= Paul Kunkel =

American tennis player

- Born: May 10, 1903; Cincinnati, Ohio, U.S.
- Died: March 1977 (aged 73)
- Education: Georgetown University
- Tennis career

Doubles
- Career titles: Cincinnati Open - 1st Place (1927)

Paul C. Kunkel (May 10, 1903 – March 1977) was an American amateur tennis player in the early part of the 20th century.

== Biography ==
Born in Cincinnati, Ohio, Kunkel played tennis at Georgetown University in Washington, D.C., and graduated in 1924.

At the Cincinnati Open, Kunkel made six finals appearances between 1922 and 1927, winning the doubles title in 1927. Of the remaining five finals, two were in singles (1923 and 1924) and the other three were in doubles (1922, 1924 and 1926). He lost the 1923 singles final to Louis Kuhler, and the 1924 final to future International Tennis Hall of Fame enshrinee George Lott. To reach his doubles finals appearances, he paired with his brother Ray Kunkel in 1922 and 1926, and with future Hall of Famer Charles Garland in 1924.

Kunkel also won the West Virginia state tennis title in 1930, was a semifinalist in both singles and doubles at the 1927 Western Championship. Kunkel was enshrined into the Georgetown University Athletic Hall of Fame. He died in March 1977.

== Sources ==
- From Club Court to Center Court by Phillip S. Smith (2008 Edition; ISBN 978-0-9712445-7-3)
- 1931 Wright & Ditson's Lawn Tennis Annual
