= 1978 Western Championships =

- Date: July 10–16
- Edition: 78th
- Category: Grand Prix Circuit
- Draw: 64S / 32D
- Prize money: $125,000
- Surface: Clay / outdoor
- Location: Cincinnati, Ohio, U.S.
- Venue: Old Coney

Champions

Singles
- (United States) Eddie Dibbs

Doubles
- (United States) Gene Mayer / (Mexico) Raúl Ramírez
- Cincinnati Open

The 1978 Western Championships, also known as the Cincinnati Open, was a tennis tournament played on outdoor clay courts at the Sunlite Swim and Tennis Club at Old Coney in Cincinnati, Ohio in the United States that was part of the 1978 Colgate-Palmolive Grand Prix. The tournament was held from July 10 through July 16, 1978. First-seeded Eddie Dibbs won the singles title and earned $20,000 first-prize money.

== Finals ==
=== Singles ===
(United States) Eddie Dibbs defeated (Mexico) Raúl Ramírez 5–7, 6–3, 6–2

- It was Dibbs' 2nd singles title of the year and the 15th of his career.

=== Doubles ===
(United States) Gene Mayer / (Mexico) Raúl Ramírez defeated (Egypt) Ismail El Shafei / (New Zealand) Brian Fairlie 6–3, 6–3
