= 1972 Western Championships =

- Date: July 31 – August 6
- Edition: 72nd
- Category: Grand Prix Circuit
- Draw: 64S / 32D
- Prize money: $42,500
- Surface: Clay / outdoor
- Location: Cincinnati, Ohio, United States
- Venue: Queen City Racquet Club

Champions

Men's singles
- (United States) Jimmy Connors

Women's singles
- (Australia) Margaret Court

Men's doubles
- (South Africa) Bob Hewitt / (South Africa) Frew McMillan

Women's doubles
- (Australia) Margaret Court / (Australia) Evonne Goolagong
- Cincinnati Open

The 1972 Western Championships, also known as the Cincinnati Open, was a combined men's and women's tennis tournament played on outdoor clay courts at the Queen City Racquet Club in the Sharonville suburb of Cincinnati, Ohio in the United States that was part of the 1972 Commercial Union Assurance Grand Prix. It was the 72nd edition of the tournament and was held from July 31 through August 6, 1972. Jimmy Connors and Margaret Court won the singles titles.

== Finals ==
=== Men's singles ===
(United States) Jimmy Connors defeated (Argentina) Guillermo Vilas 6–3, 6–3

- It was Connors' 5th singles title of the year and of his career.

=== Women's singles ===
(Australia) Margaret Court defeated (Australia) Evonne Goolagong 3–6, 6–2, 7–5

=== Men's doubles ===
(South Africa) Bob Hewitt / (South Africa) Frew McMillan defeated (United States) Paul Gerken / (Venezuela) Humphrey Hose 7–6, 6–4

=== Women's doubles ===
(Australia) Margaret Court / (Australia) Evonne Goolagong defeated (South Africa) Brenda Kirk / (South Africa) Pat Walkden-Pretorius 6–4, 6–1
