= Monica Nolan =

American tennis player

- Born: December 28, 1913; Cincinnati, Ohio, U.S.
- Died: December 18, 1995 (aged 81)
- Education: University of Cincinnati

Monica Nolan (December 28, 1913 in Cincinnati, Ohio – December 18, 1995) was an American tennis player in the 1930s and 1940s.

== Career ==
Nolan made six finals appearances at the Cincinnati Masters. She won the doubles title in 1939 with Catherine Wolf, was a three-time doubles finalist (1942, 1938 and 1937), and was a two-time singles finalist (1942 & 1937).

Nolan also won the 1939 Ohio Singles Championship and was a finalist in that tournament in 1938. At the Kentucky State Championship, she won singles titles in 1938 & 1939. She also won the Northern Kentucky tennis championship in 1931.

She played on the University of Cincinnati tennis team and is a member of the University of Cincinnati Athletic Hall of Fame.

=== Congressional campaign ===
In 1962, she ran a campaign for Congress but was defeated by Carl W. Rich.
