= 1980 ATP Championship =

- Date: August 18–24
- Edition: 80th
- Category: Grand Prix circuit
- Draw: 64S / 32D
- Prize money: $200,000
- Surface: Hard / outdoor
- Location: Mason, Ohio, U.S.
- Venue: Lindner Family Tennis Center

Champions

Singles
- (United States) Harold Solomon

Doubles
- (United States) Bruce Manson / (United States) Brian Teacher
- Cincinnati Open

The 1980 ATP Championship, also known as the Cincinnati Open, was a men's tennis tournament played on outdoor hard courts at the Lindner Family Tennis Center in Mason, Ohio in the United States that was part of the 1980 Volvo Grand Prix. It was the 80th edition of the tournament and was held from August 18 through August 24, 1980. Third-seeded Harold Solomon won the singles title.

== Finals ==
=== Singles ===
(United States) Harold Solomon defeated (Paraguay) Francisco González 7–6, 6–3

- It was Solomon's 3rd singles title of the year and the 21st of his career.

=== Doubles ===
(United States) Bruce Manson / (United States) Brian Teacher defeated (Poland) Wojtek Fibak / (Czechoslovakia) Ivan Lendl 6–7, 7–5, 6–4
