= Louis Kuhler =

American tennis player

Louis Edwin Kuhler, Jr. (July 11, 1902 – March 21, 1925) was a promising young American tennis player who was ranked as high as No. 26 in the United States.

Kuhler, born in Cincinnati, Ohio, was the son of Louis Sr. and Mary Fromeyer Kuhler. In 1922, at the age of 20, he won the tournament in his hometown: the Cincinnati Open. In the next year, 1923, he successfully defended his singles title and took the doubles title as well (with Howard Cordes). Also in 1923, he won the Ohio State championship over Kirk Reid of Cleveland.

The following year, 1924, he reached the quarterfinals in Cincinnati before falling to former National junior champion Julius Sagalowsky. Also, at the Ohio state championships he was the singles runner-up (falling to George Lott) and won the mixed doubles with Olga Strashun.

Kuhler did not get much of a chance to add to his laurels in 1925. He died of encephalitis (an inflammation of the brain) four months shy of his twenty-third birthday. He was buried in Cincinnati's Spring Grove Cemetery on March 23, 1925.

== Sources ==
- From Club Court to Center Court by Phillip S. Smith (2008 Edition; ISBN 978-0-9712445-7-3)
