= 1983 ATP Championship =

- Date: August 20–26
- Edition: 82nd
- Category: Grand Prix circuit
- Draw: 64S / 32D
- Prize money: $300,000
- Surface: Hard / outdoor
- Location: Mason, Ohio, US
- Venue: Lindner Family Tennis Center

Champions

Singles
- (Sweden) Mats Wilander

Doubles
- (United States) Victor Amaya / (United States) Tim Gullikson
- Cincinnati Masters

The 1983 ATP Championship, also known as the Cincinnati Open, was a men's tennis tournament played on outdoor hardcourt|s at the Lindner Family Tennis Center in Mason, Ohio in the United States that was part of the 1983 Volvo Grand Prix. The tournament was held from August 20 through August 26, 1983. Fourth-seeded Mats Wilander won the singles title.

== Finals ==
=== Singles ===
(Sweden) Mats Wilander defeated (United States) John McEnroe 6–4, 6–4

- It was Wilander's 5th singles title of the year and the 9th of his career.

=== Doubles ===
(United States) Victor Amaya / (United States) Tim Gullikson defeated (Brazil) Carlos Kirmayr / (Brazil) Cássio Motta 6–4, 6–3
