= Ruth Sanders Cordes =

American tennis player

- Born: August 20, 1890; Cincinnati, Ohio, U.S.
- Died: February 11, 1968 (aged 77)
- Occupation: Teacher
- Spouse: Howard F. Cordes (m. 1917)
- Children: 3
- Tennis career
- Country (sports): United States
- College: University of Cincinnati

Ruth Sanders Cordes (August 20, 1890 — February 11, 1968) was a top-level American amateur tennis player.

== Biography ==
Born in Cincinnati, Ohio, Sanders Cordes graduated from Hughes Center High School and from the University of Cincinnati in 1912.

At the Cincinnati Open, she was 27-7 in 12 appearances in women's singles, winning five singles titles: 1913, 1914, 1920, 1922 and 1923. Her only loss in a singles final came in 1915, when he lost to Molla Bjurstedt. She also reached six singles quarterfinals, won a doubles title (1911) and reached two doubles finals (1915 & 1920).

At the 1917 National Clay Court Championship, held in Cincinnati in July that year, Sanders won the singles title (defeating Winifred Swarts Ellis in the final), paired with Marie Gregg to take the women's doubles title (defeating Ellis and Adele Levy in the final), and paired with future husband Howard F. Cordes to take the mixed doubles title (over Leonora Hofer and Chuck Garland). Sanders married Cordes the following month on August 14, 1917.

In 2003, she was posthumously inducted into the Cincinnati Tennis Hall of Fame, alongside Bill Talbert, Tony Trabert, Barry MacKay, Clara Louise Zinke and others.
