= 1977 Western Championships =

- Date: August 11–18
- Edition: 77th
- Category: Grand Prix Circuit (Three star)
- Draw: 64S / 32D
- Prize money: $100,000
- Surface: Clay / outdoor
- Location: Cincinnati, Ohio, U.S.
- Venue: Old Coney

Champions

Singles
- (United States) Harold Solomon

Doubles
- (Australia) John Alexander / (Australia) Phil Dent
- Cincinnati Open

The 1977 Western Championships, also known as the Cincinnati Open, was a men's tennis tournament played on outdoor clay courts at the Sunlite Swim and Tennis Club at Old Coney in Cincinnati, Ohio in the United States that was part of the 1977 Colgate-Palmolive Grand Prix. It was the 77th edition of the tournament and was held from August 11 through August 18, 1977. Third-seeded Harold Solomon won the singles title.

== Finals ==
=== Singles ===
(United States) Harold Solomon defeated (United Kingdom) Mark Cox 6–2, 6–3

- It was Solomon's 2nd singles title of the year and the 12th of his career.

=== Doubles ===
(Australia) John Alexander / (Australia) Phil Dent defeated (South Africa) Bob Hewitt / (United States) Roscoe Tanner 6–3, 7–6
