= 1979 ATP Championship =

- Date: August 20–26
- Edition: 79th
- Category: Grand Prix circuit
- Draw: 64S / 32D
- Prize money: $200,000
- Surface: Hard / outdoor
- Location: Mason, Ohio, U.S.
- Venue: Lindner Family Tennis Center

Champions

Singles
- (United States) Peter Fleming

Doubles
- (United States) Brian Gottfried / (Romania) Ilie Năstase
- Cincinnati Open

The 1979 ATP Championship, also known as the Cincinnati Open, was a men's tennis tournament played on outdoor hard courts at the Lindner Family Tennis Center in Mason, Ohio in the United States that was part of the 1979 Colgate-Palmolive Grand Prix. It was the 79th edition of the tournament and was held from August 20 through August 26, 1979. Seventh-seeded Peter Fleming won the singles title.

== Finals ==
=== Singles ===
(United States) Peter Fleming defeated (United States) Roscoe Tanner 6–4, 6–2

- It was Fleming's 1st singles title of the year and the 2nd of his career.

=== Doubles ===
(United States) Brian Gottfried / (Romania) Ilie Năstase defeated (United States) Bob Lutz / (United States) Stan Smith 1–6, 6–3, 7–6
