= Python (Coney Island, Cincinnati) =

Steel roller coaster

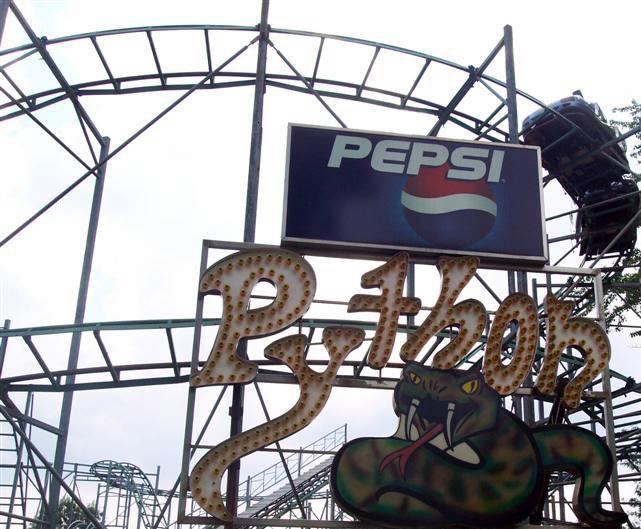
- One of the trains entering a turn

Coney Island
- Location: Coney Island
- Park section: Sunlite Water Adventure
- Coordinates: 39.053917°N 84.419020°W
- Status: Removed
- Opening date: 1999
- Closing date: September 21, 2019

General statistics
- Type: Steel
- Manufacturer: Pinfari
- Designer: Daniel Pinfari
- Model: Compact Family Coaster
- Track layout: Zyklon/Galaxi
- Lift/launch system: Chain lift hill
- Height: 40 ft (12 m)
- Length: 1,100 ft (340 m)
- Inversions: 0
- Duration: 1:24
- Python at RCDB

The Python is a D.P.V. Rides designed Zyklon-style steel roller coaster. It operated from 1996 to 1999 at Splash Zone Water Park, but was relocated to Coney Island at the end of the 1999 season. Following Coney Island's removal of all their amusement rides in 2019, the Python was sold to an independent ride operator - Kissel Entertainment, who refurbished the coaster and began touring with it in 2023.

== 2008 incident ==
On May 26, 2008, the Python slightly derailed at the top of its first drop, leaving its lone passenger stranded just over the edge of the drop. There were no injuries. It was closed after the incident. The ride reopened on May 28, 2008.
