= William S. McEllroy =

American tennis player

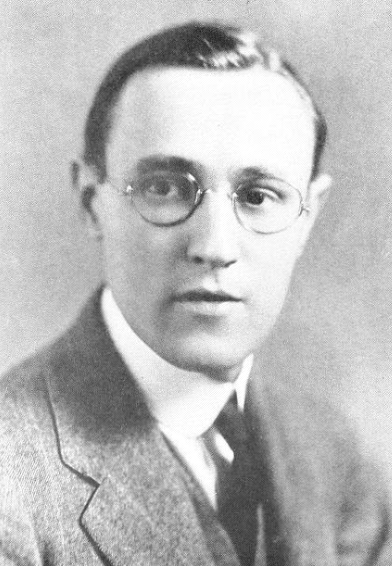
- Born: William Swindler McEllroy; September 26, 1893; Edgewood, Pennsylvania, US
- Died: January 2, 1981 (aged 87); State College, Pennsylvania, US
- Burial place: Homewood Cemetery
- Education: University of Pittsburgh
- Occupations: Tennis player, physician

William Swindler McEllroy (September 26, 1893 – January 2, 1981) was an American tennis player and physician.

== Biography ==
William S. McEllroy was born in Edgewood, Pennsylvania on September 26, 1893.

He died in State College, Pennsylvania on January 2, 1981, and was buried at Homewood Cemetery.

== Tennis career ==
A member of the University of Pittsburgh's tennis team, he served as coach of its tennis team in the 1920s and 1930s. He also obtained a medical degree from the University of Pittsburgh and later served as Dean of the University of Pittsburgh School of Medicine.

At the Cincinnati Open, McEllroy won the singles title in 1913 and 1914 and the doubles title in 1913 (with Joseph J. Armstrong) and was the singles runner-up in 1915 (falling to future International Tennis Hall of Fame inductee Clarence Griffin.)

Other notable results:

- Singles finalist (likely): 1912 Canadian National Championships
- Singles champion: 1915 New York State Championships; 1915 Ohio State Championships
- Singles semifinalist: 1926 Ohio State Championships
- Doubles champion: 1915 New York State Championships
- Doubles runner-up: 1915 Ohio State Championships
- Mixed Doubles champion: 1915 Ohio State Championships
