= 1973 Western Championships =

- Date: August 6–12
- Edition: 73rd
- Category: Grand Prix Circuit
- Draw: 32S / 16D
- Prize money: $50,000
- Surface: Clay / outdoor
- Location: Cincinnati, Ohio, US
- Venue: Queen City Racquet Club

Champions

Men's singles
- (Romania) Ilie Năstase

Women's singles
- (Australia) Evonne Goolagong

Men's doubles
- (Australia) John Alexander / (Australia) Phil Dent

Women's doubles
- (South Africa) Ilana Kloss / (South Africa) Pat Pretorius
- Cincinnati Open

The 1973 Western Championships, also known as the Cincinnati Open, was a combined men's and women's tennis tournament played on outdoor clay courts at the Queen City Racquet Club in the Sharonville suburb of Cincinnati, Ohio in the United States that was part of the 1973 Commercial Union Assurance Grand Prix. The tournament was held from August 6 through August 12, 1973. Ilie Năstase and Evonne Goolagong won the singles titles.

== Finals ==
=== Men's singles ===
(Romania) Ilie Năstase defeated (Spain) Manuel Orantes 5–7, 6–3, 6–4

=== Women's singles ===
(Australia) Evonne Goolagong defeated (United States) Chris Evert 6–2, 7–5

=== Men's doubles ===
(Australia) John Alexander / (Australia) Phil Dent defeated (United States) Brian Gottfried / (Mexico) Raúl Ramírez 1–6, 7–6, 7–6

=== Women's doubles ===
(South Africa) Ilana Kloss / (South Africa) Pat Pretorius defeated (Australia) Evonne Goolagong / (Australia) Janet Young 7–6, 3–6, 6–2
