= Marion Leighton =

American tennis player

- Born: c. 1898; Chicago, Illinois, U.S.
- Died: December 1, 1942 (aged 44); Pasadena, California, U.S.
- Tennis career

Singles

Grand Slam singles results
- US Open: Out 3rd round (1924)

Marion F. Leighton (c. 1898, Chicago - December 1, 1942, Pasadena) was an American tennis player from Chicago, Illinois. She was an amateur in the first quarter of the 20th Century. She was ranked as high as No. 15 in the United States singles rankings.

== Biography ==
She won the singles title of the Chicago Public High School League in 1915 and 1917 as a student of Hyde Park High School.

Leighton won the Chicago City Championship singles title for five consecutive years from 1921 to 1925.

At the Tri-State Tennis Tournament, now known as the Cincinnati Masters, Leighton won the singles title in 1925 (becoming one of the few to beat Clara Louise Zinke in a Cincinnati final), and was a singles and doubles finalist in 1927.

She reached the third round of the singles event at the 1924 U.S. National Championships in which she was defeated in straight sets by Marion Jessup.

Other accomplishments:

- Singles champion: 1922 & 1924 Western Tennis Championships; 1924 Illinois State Championships, 1926 Ohio State Championships
- Singles runner-up: 1923 & 1926 Western Tennis Championships; 1926 Illinois State Championships
- Singles semifinalist: 1921 Western Tennis Championships
- Doubles champion: 1927 Wisconsin State Championships
- Doubles runner-up: 1924 Illinois State Championships
