= Julius Sagalowsky =

American tennis player

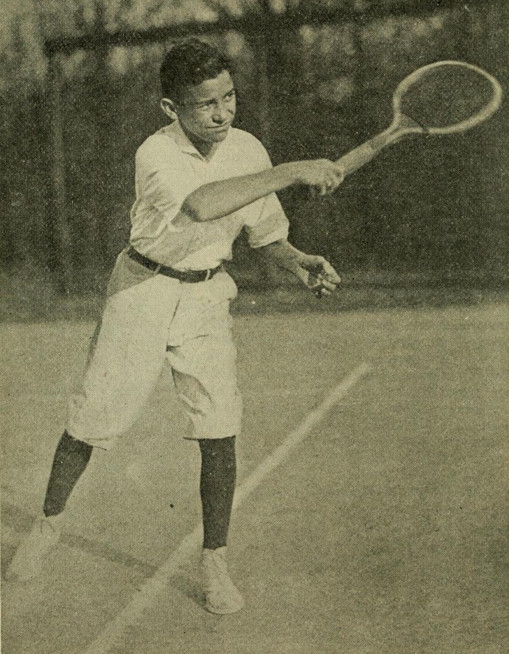
- Sagalowsky, ca. 1921
- Country (sports): United States
- Born: May 13, 1905 Indianapolis, Indiana
- Died: October 26, 1977 (aged 72) Indianapolis, Indiana

Julius Sagalowsky (May 13, 1905 – October 26, 1977) was an American amateur tennis player in the 1920s.

Sagalowsky won the US national boys championship in 1921. He was the singles runner-up at the Cincinnati Masters in 1925, falling to future International Tennis Hall of Fame enshrinee George Lott in the final in three straight sets.

In 1926, he was the runner-up in both singles and doubles at the Indiana State Championship.
