= Robert Chauncey Seaver =

American tennis player

- Country (sports): United States
- Born: January 8, 1877 Norfolk, USA
- Died: March 25, 1944 (aged 67) Cohasset, USA

Grand Slam singles results
- US Open: QF (1903)

Robert Chauncey Seaver (1877-1944) was an American amateur tennis player of the early 20th Century.

In 1903 he reached the quarterfinal of the singles event at the U.S. National Championships.

In 1905 he won the singles title at the Massachusetts Championship after a win over H.J. Holt in the final and a default by defending champion Beals Wright in the challenge round. At the Cincinnati Masters, Seaver reached the singles final in 1907 before falling to Robert LeRoy, 8–6, 6–8, 6–2, 6–0. In 1913 he won the singles title at the Great Lakes Championship, defeating T.W. Hendrick in the final. The following year, 1914, he lost his title in the final against Clarence Griffin.

He married Edith S. Willard on February 19, 1912, in Longwood, Massachusetts.
