= Cincinnati Tennis Club =

- U.S. National Register of Historic Places
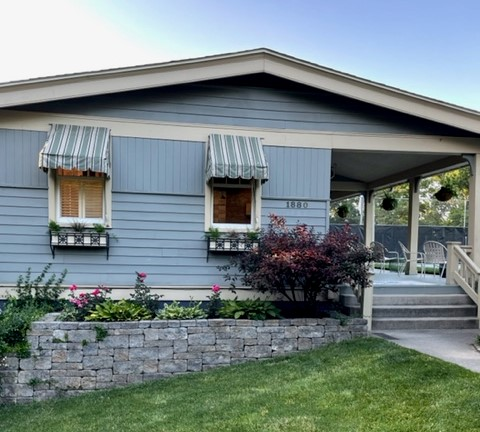
- Entrance in 2023
- Location: Dexter and Wold Avenues Cincinnati, Ohio
- Coordinates: 39°8′3″N 84°28′10″W
- NRHP reference No.: 83001979
- Added to NRHP: March 23, 1983

The Cincinnati Tennis Club was founded in 1880 just five years after tennis was introduced in America, and is today one of the oldest active tennis clubs in the United States.

== History ==
Stewart Shillito, the son of John Shillito, the founder of the Cincinnati department store, Shillito's, had seen tennis played while on vacation at the fashionable seaside resort of Narragansett Pier, Rhode Island, and in 1878 he decided to build a court at his father's home on Highland Avenue and Oak Street in the Cincinnati neighborhood of Mt. Auburn.

After the first court was built, interest spread rapidly among enthusiastic friends of Shillito, and by 1880, Cincinnati was ready for a tennis club.

On December 3, 1880, Edmund H. Pendleton presided over a meeting held at the Burnet House in Cincinnati, the purpose being the organization of a tennis club. A constitution was drawn up and the following officers were nominated and elected: President - Jeptha Garrand; Secretary - Howard S. Winslow; and Treasurer - Albert C. Barney.

In one week, 86 players were enrolled as members, and the south wing of Music Hall was leased for indoor play until May 1881, making Cincinnati the site of some of the earliest indoor play in America. The lease on Music Hall was renewed for an additional year, but soon thereafter the decision was made to terminate the agreement. (The story is that the roof leaked, and the club members wanted a discount on the rent because of it.) With the termination of the lease, the era of the nineteenth century indoor tennis ended in Cincinnati.

At the time one of the officers of the club, Howard S. Winslow, lived on Oak Street and Reading Road. His father generously made available to the members if the club (CTC) sufficient ground to lay three grass courts at the rear of his property which was adjacent to a lane. The city fathers, seeing growing tennis activity, named the lane Tennis Lane. It continues to bear that name today.

The CTC remained at that location through 1885, when it moved, with no explanation, to a new location on Arbigust Street (now called Vernon Place).

For the next 13 years the Club occupied two different locations on Vernon Place. During these years the Club grew in terms of membership and activity, and in two of the three years, 1891 and 1893, the club sponsored the Ohio State Adult Championship. Having moved twice in 13 years, the club began looking in 1898 for a more permanent address.

Among the members of CTC were John B. Keys and John Scarborough. Each owned tracts of land which they were interested in developing into a subdivision. They both hoped to do the club a favor, and at the same time enhance the value of their holdings by encouraging the club to locate on their property. John Keys offered as a gift 3 acres (12,000 m^{2}) of land on Bedford Avenue adjoining the new Cincinnati Golf Club. John Scarborough offered the Club what is substantially its present location, not as a gift, but rent free for the first few years. Mr. Scarborough agreed to lay out four courts and build a club house at his own expense.

Finally in the spring of 1899, Scarborough's offer was excepted because Keys' property on Bedford was considered "too far out in the country and somewhat inaccessible".

Thirty-eight members from Vernon Place along with many new members brought the membership to 186 when the courts were opened. Some of the improvements promised in the Scarborough agreements were not completed until 1900.

In the first year at the new location there were four courts, the present courts 1, 2, 9 and 10. In 1904 three more courts were added to the upper tier, the present 6, 7 and 8. In 1925 three courts were added to the lower tier, courts 3, 4 and 5. The original club house was torn down in 1905 and replaced with the present structure in 1906.

== The Tri-State Tournament ==
Between the years of 1903 and 1968, and with the exception of about 10 years, the Club hosted the popular and well-known tournament known as the Tri-State Tennis Tournament. This event attracted many of the best male and female players from around the country and the world, and the tournament was always one of the major events on the major tennis schedule during the Pre-Open Era.

In 1904 The Cincinnati Enquirer reported: "Such a number of noted tennis players from cities throughout the United States has been entered that the Tri-State Tournament ranks very high, being surpassed in importance only by the National Lawn Tennis Association Tournament at Newport, R.I."

Many great players, both men and women, participated in the tournament. Its list of winners reads like a "Who's Who'" of tennis - Nat Emerson, Beals Wright, Bill Tilden, George Lott, Bobby Riggs, Frank Parker, Bill Talbert, Tony Trabert, Barry MacKay (tennis), May Sutton, Alice Marble, Pauline Betz, and Dorothy Bundy, to name but a few.

This tournament eventually would grow into what is now known as the Cincinnati Open. The tournament, now held in the Cincinnati suburb of Mason, is the oldest tournament in the nation played in its original city.

== Nat Emerson and Tony Trabert ==
The club has had a number of nationally ranked players, the first being Nat Emerson who won the Tri-State Tournament when it was first played in 1899, and was a finalist several times afterward. He was ranked No. 7 in Men's Singles by the USTA in 1908. Another nationally prominent player in the early years was Reuben A. Holden Jr., who won the NCAA Singles Championship in 1910 while a student at Yale University. It was 41 years later in 1951, when Club member Tony Trabert playing for the University of Cincinnati won the NCAA Singles title. Barry MacKay (tennis) of Dayton also won the NCAA Singles title in 1957, while at the University of Michigan.

Trabert was one of the most prominent players in the modern history of tennis. He played on the United States Davis Cup team and was later the captain. He won the French singles twice, 1954–55 as well as the Wimbledon and U.S. singles in 1955, making him one of only nine men in tennis history to have won three of the four major titles in a calendar year. He was elected to the International Tennis Hall of Fame in 1970. Court 2 at the tennis club has been dedicated in his honor.

Bill Talbert was ranked in the U.S. Top 10 13 times between 1941 & 1954. He won nine Grand Slam doubles titles, and also reached the men's doubles finals of the U.S. National Championship nine times. He also was a Davis Cup player and one of the most successful Davis Cup captains in U.S. history. He was enshrined into the International Tennis Hall of Fame in 1967 and was in the first class, along with his former protégé Tony Trabert, enshrined into the Cincinnati Tennis Hall of Fame. After his playing career, he was Tournament Director of the US Open. Talbert and Trabert were both coached by Howard Zaeh, as well as many hundreds of others who went on to play around the world.

== Davis Cup ==
Throughout this long period the Club continued to bring world class players and teams to Cincinnati, including a Davis Cup tie in 1952, the first ever to be played here. All this activity did much to further the interest in tennis in Cincinnati and in the Ohio Valley area.

== Prominent members ==
In addition to a number of outstanding players, CTC has had distinguished and prominent citizens in its membership. To name a few, William Howard Taft, 27th President of the United States and later Chief Justice of the Supreme Court; Potter Stewart, Justice of the Supreme court; Neil McElroy, Secretary of Defense in the Eisenhower Administration and President and Chairman of the Procter & Gamble Company. Too numerous to mention are other members who have been leaders in the business community, medical, legal and teaching professions. From 1993 to 1995, member J. Howard "Bumpy" Frazer served as president of the USTA - the first Cincinnatian ever to direct the national organization. Another member, Alvin Bunis, founded the first tennis senior tour—the first senior tour in either tennis or golf.

== National Register of Historic Places ==
CTC has occupied its present site at Dexter and Wold Avenues since 1899, and on March 29, 1983 it was listed on the National Register of Historic Places by the United States Department of Interior for its leadership in the development and advancement of the sport of tennis in the Cincinnati and Ohio Valley Area.

== National Father Son Clay Court Championships ==
Since 1974, the club has played host to the United States Tennis Association's National Father & Son Clay Court Championships.
