= Virginia Hollinger =

American tennis player

- Born: February 4, 1917
- Died: March 17, 1946 (aged 29); Dayton, Ohio, U.S.
- Spouse: Willis McCloud (m. 1942)
- Children: 1

Virginia Hollinger (February 4, 1917 – March 17, 1946) of Dayton, Ohio, was an amateur tennis player in the 1930s and 1940s.

== Biography ==
Hollinger made six appearances at the Cincinnati Open between 1932 and 1939, winning singles titles in 1937 & 1938, and reaching the singles finals in 1936 and 1939.

She won numerous junior titles, including the National Girls Indoor Championship in 1934, 1935 and 1936. She also won the singles and doubles titles at the 1934 Western Girls Championships, and was a quarterfinalist in the 1934 National Girls' Championship.

In 1938 she won the U.S. Indoor Championships singles title after defeating Katherine Winthrop in the final.

A tennis club in her hometown of Dayton bears her name: The Virginia Hollinger Memorial Tennis Club.

At the time of her death from Hodgkin lymphoma, she and her husband Willis McCloud had one daughter, Holly.
