= 1975 Western Championships =

- Date: July 29 – August 3
- Edition: 75th
- Category: Grand Prix Circuit
- Draw: 32S / 16D
- Prize money: $50,000
- Surface: Hard / outdoor
- Location: Cincinnati, Ohio, U.S.
- Venue: Old Coney

Champions

Singles
- (United States) Tom Gorman

Doubles
- (Australia) Phil Dent / (South Africa) Cliff Drysdale
- Cincinnati Open

The 1975 Western Championships, also known as the Cincinnati Open, was a men's tennis tournament played on outdoor hard courts at the Sunlite Swim and Tennis Club at Old Coney in Cincinnati, Ohio in the United States that was part of the 1975 Commercial Union Assurance Grand Prix. It was the 75th edition of the tournament and was held from July 29 through August 3, 1975. Seventh-seeded Tom Gorman won the singles title.

== Finals ==
=== Singles ===
(United States) Tom Gorman defeated (United States) Sherwood Stewart 7–5, 2–6, 6–4

- It was Gorman's 1st singles title of the year and the 4th of his career in the Open Era.

=== Doubles ===
(Australia) Phil Dent / (South Africa) Cliff Drysdale defeated (Mexico) Marcelo Lara / (Mexico) Joaquín Loyo Mayo 7–6, 6–4
