= Martha Kinsey =

American tennis player and golfer

- Country (sports): United States
- Born: July 20, 1882 Wyoming, Ohio, U.S.
- Died: United States

Martha Kinsey (July 20, 1882 – ) was an American amateur tennis player and golfer in the early part of the 20th century.

At the tennis tournament in her hometown of Cincinnati, Kinsey, a left-hander, reached nine finals in four years: four doubles finals, three singles finals and two mixed doubles finals. She won every doubles final she played in Cincinnati, and won one singles title as well.

She won the singles title in 1908, beating Marjorie Dodd in the final. She was runner-up in 1907 (to future International Tennis Hall of Fame enshrinee May Sutton), and in 1909 (to Edith Hannam of Great Britain).

Her doubles titles came each year between 1907 and 1910. She won in 1907 with Ruth Cowing, in 1908 with Dodd, in 1909 with Adele Kruse, and in 1910 with Helen McLaughlin.

She also was a two-time mixed doubles finalist: in 1908 with William Hopple, and in 1910 with P. Lincoln Mitchell.

In the 1920s, she turned in her tennis racquet for a set of golf clubs, becoming one of the best golfers of her age, playing in tournaments across the nation. In 1928, she moved to Long Island, NY.

== Sources ==
- From Club Court to Center Court by Phillip S. Smith (2008 Edition; ISBN 978-0-9712445-7-3)
