= Clara Louise Zinke =

American tennis player

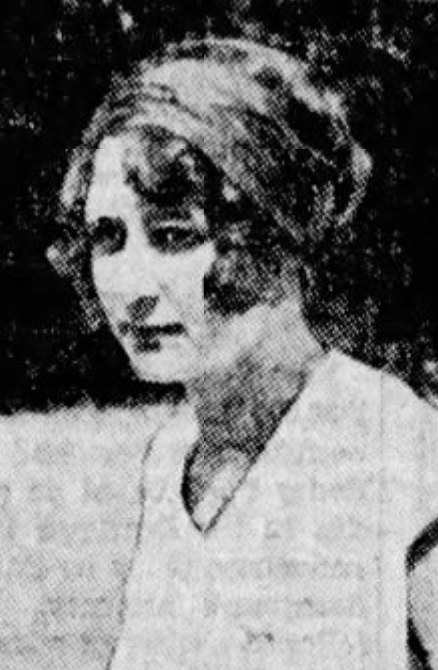
- Clara Louise Zinke, from a 1927 newspaper
- Country (sports): United States
- Born: March 30, 1909 Cincinnati, OH, United States
- Died: April 20, 1978 (aged 69) Cincinnati, OH, United States

Grand Slam singles results
- US Open: 2R (1929)

Clara Louise Zinke Judd (March 30, 1909 – April 20, 1978) was an American tennis player in the early part of the 20th century. Later in life, she became a social worker.

== Early life and education ==
Zinke was born in Cincinnati, Ohio, to Stanley Gustav Zinke and Beulah Few Zinke. Her father was a physician. She graduated from Hughes High School and the University of Cincinnati.

== Sports career ==
Zinke played tennis competitively on the national level as a junior and adult. She was a singles finalist in the U.S. National Girls singles championship of 1926, and at the Cincinnati Open, she won more total titles (12) than any other woman in tournament history:

- Singles titles (5): 1926, '27, '29, '30 & '31
- Mixed doubles Title (1): 1931
- Doubles titles (6): 1927, '28, '30, '31, '32 & '33

Zinke still holds tournament records in Cincinnati for most total finals appearances (18), most singles finals appearances (10) and most doubles finals appearances (7) for both men and women. (The other appearance was in mixed doubles, which she won, in 1931.)

Other career highlights:

- Ranked No. 1 in 1928 & 1929 USTA/Midwest section singles rankings
- Ranked No. 1 in doubles in 1928, 1929 & 1931 USTA/Midwest section rankings with Ruth Oexman
- Ranked No. 2 in the USTA/Midwest section singles rankings in 1927 (behind Marion Leighton of Chicago) and 1931 (behind U.S. top tenner Catherine Wolf)
- Singles Champion: 1929 Western Indoor Championship; 1929 Ohio State Championships; 1927 Michigan State Championships
- Singles Finalist: 1927, 1929 & 1930 Western Tennis Championship; 1927, 1929 & 1930 Illinois State Championship
- Singles Semifinalist: 1931 Western Tennis Championship; 1928 South Atlantic Championships in Augusta; 1926 Illinois State Championship
- Doubles Champion: 1928, 1929 and 1931 Western Championship; 1929 Illinois State Championship; 1927 Michigan State Championships
- Doubles Finalist: 1926 & 1927 Illinois State Championship; 1927 Western Tennis Championship; 1929 Eastern Grass Court Championships
- U.S. National Championships at Forest Hills, NY – reached the second round in 1929
- Mixed Doubles Champion: 1929 Western Indoor Championship
- Mixed Doubles Finalist: 1926 Western Clay Court Championships with future Hall of Famer George Lott; 1929 Seabright (NJ) Tournament with J. Gilbert Hall

== Later life and legacy ==
Zinke was an amateur pianist and songwriter, and active in lawn bowling and surf fishing. She worked as a social worker for the United States Department of Agriculture and the United States Housing Authority, and was an admissions counselor at a nursing home. Her first husband was John B. Sparling; they married in 1931 and divorced in 1933. Her second husband was college professor and hospital superintendent Henry Northey Hooper; they married in 1941, and he died in 1966. Her third husband was bank executive WIlliam M. Judd. She died in 1978, in Cincinnati, Ohio, at the age of 69. In 2004 she was inducted into the Cincinnati Tennis Hall of Fame.
