= Coney Island (Cincinnati) =

Water park in Ohio, United States

- Previously known as: Parker's Grove (1870–1885); Ohio Grove, The Coney Island of the West (1886); Old Coney (1976–1985)
- Interactive map of Coney Island
- Location: Cincinnati, Ohio, United States
- Coordinates: 39.054268°N 84.420040°W
- Status: Defunct
- Opened: 1870
- Closed: December 31, 2023
- Slogan: Coney Island: Family. Fun. Memories.
- Operating season: May–September (water park)
- Area: 100 acres

Attractions
- Water rides: 6

Coney Island was a seasonal amusement park and water park destination on the banks of the Ohio River in Cincinnati, Ohio, located approximately 10 miles (16 km) east of the downtown area adjacent to Riverbend Music Center. One of its signature attractions, the Sunlite Pool, was the largest recirculating pool in North America and one of the largest of its kind in the world. Coney Island first opened as a picnic grove in 1870, and by the turn of the century, the park had added a lineup of popular amusement rides and significantly increased in size.

With frequent flooding a reoccurring issue, along with growing competition, park management ultimately decided that a larger destination was needed away from the river bank. Coney Island was sold to Taft Broadcasting in 1969 for $6.5 million. It was relocated further north to Mason, Ohio, where it reopened as Kings Island in 1972. The old location reopened in 1973 and was renamed Old Coney, featuring only the Sunlite Pool initially. Smaller flat rides and other water park amenities eventually returned, and under new ownership, the park resumed operation as Coney Island in 1985. 15 acres (6.1 ha) of land were donated to the Cincinnati Symphony Orchestra (CSO) to build Riverbend, an outdoor amphitheater designed to withstand flooding.

A decision was made in 2019 to remove the park's amusement rides, and operation continued as a water park resort only. Coney Island permanently closed after the 2023 season following its sale to Music and Event Management, Inc. (MEMI), a subsidiary of CSO, which demolished what remained to redevelop the area as a state-of-the-art entertainment venue.

== History ==
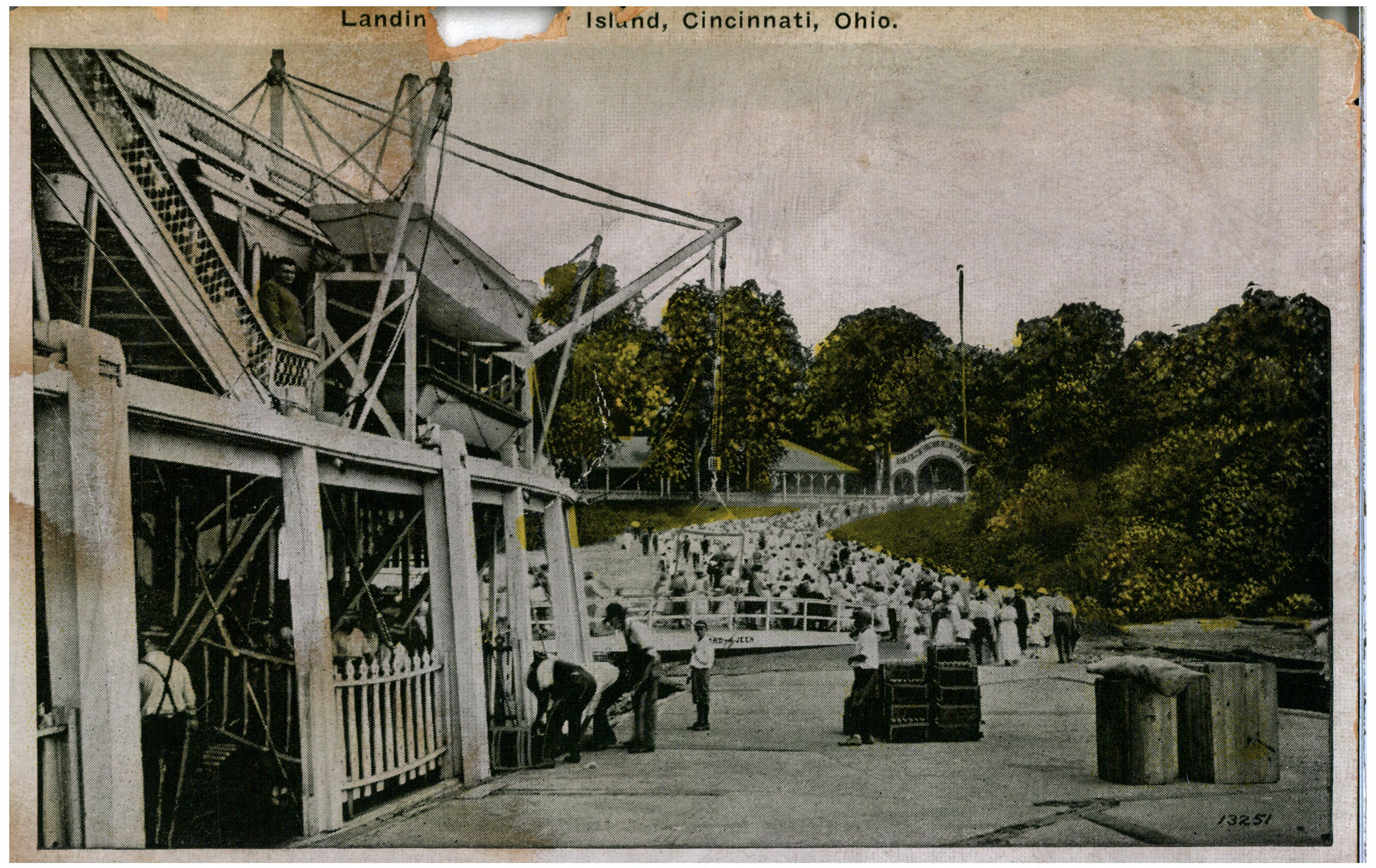
Postcard - Landing at Coney Island, Cincinnati, Ohio

In 1867, an apple farmer by the name of James Parker purchased a 20-acre (0.081 km^{2}) apple orchard located along the shores of the Ohio River. After renting out the land for a private picnic in 1870, he realized its potential to become a popular gathering place for local residents and named it Parker's Grove. Instead of apple farming, he focused his efforts on building amenities such as a dining hall, dance hall, and bowling alley, and when apple trees died, he replaced them with maple trees for shade.

The Ohio Grove Corporation, a company headed by two steamboat captains, purchased Parker's Grove in 1886 for $17,500. They changed the name to "Ohio Grove, The Coney Island of the West" in an effort to link the park with the famous New York destination, and it was marketed as "Cincinnati's Moral Resort" ahead of its grand opening on June 21, 1886. At a time when trolley parks were beginning to appear throughout the United States, Ohio Grove's riverfront location near the major inland port of Cincinnati helped ensure that the riverboat would become the most popular method of transportation for park guests. The name of the park was shortened to Coney Island after "Ohio Grove" was dropped from the title in 1887.

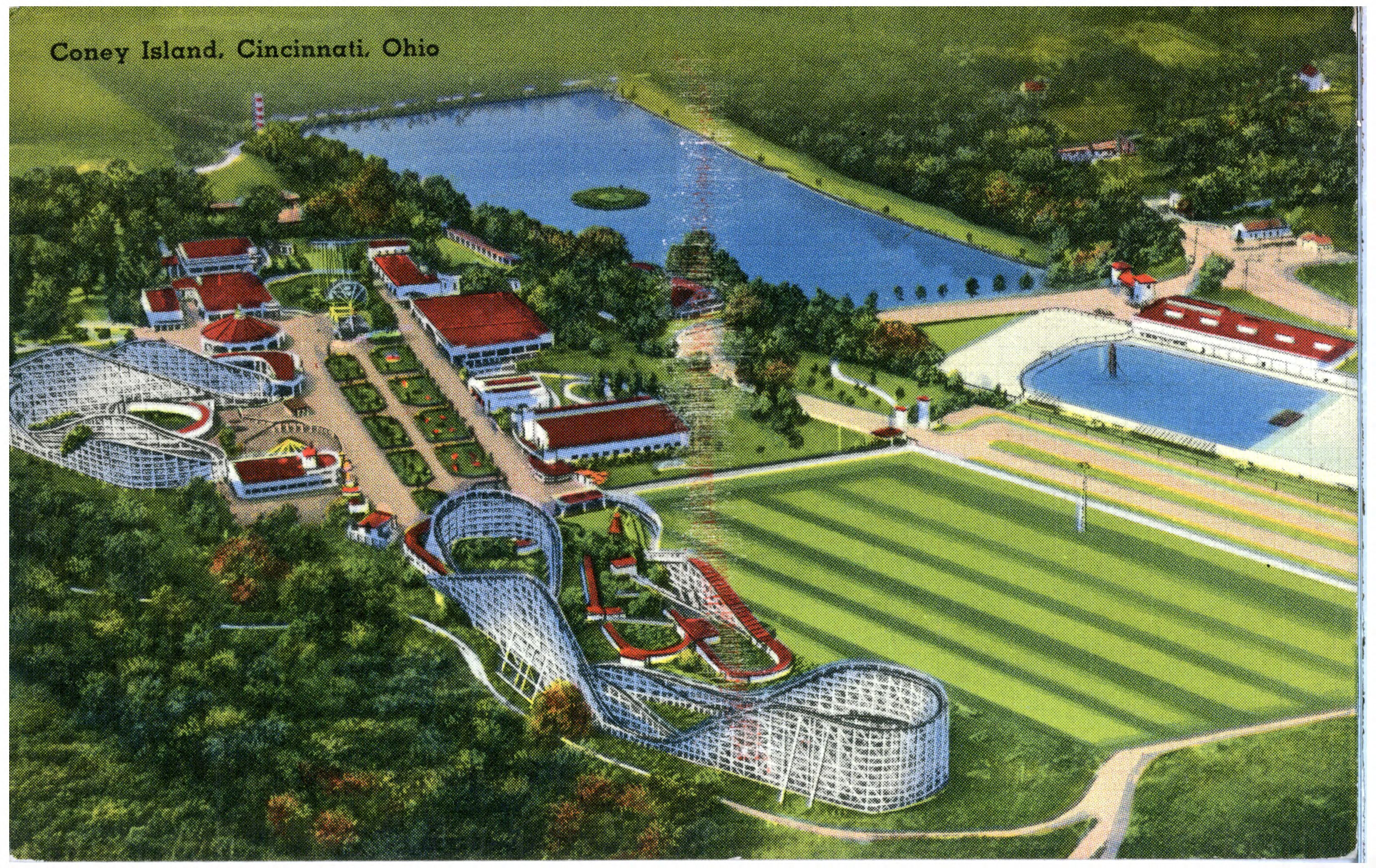
1939 postcard

The Sunlite Pool was added in 1925. It is an outdoor freshwater pool with 7,450 m^{2} (80,200 sq ft) surface area. It was the largest recirculating pool in North America, and at one time, was the largest in the world.

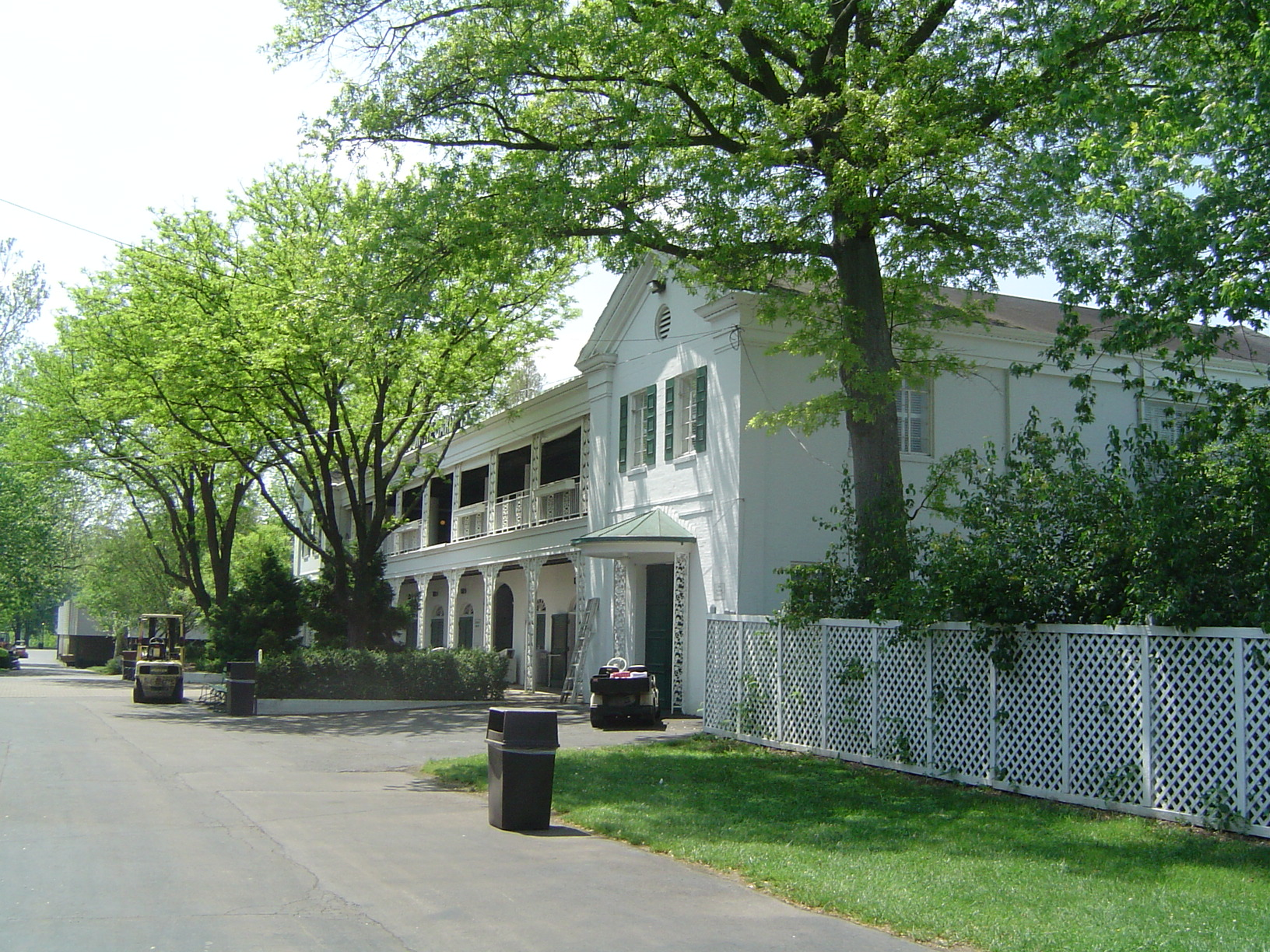
Moonlite Gardens at Coney Island

Over the years, Coney Island became a full-fledged amusement park, complete with rides and carnival games. Notable additions included the first and second Island Queen in 1896 and 1925, respectively, Moonlite Gardens dance pavilion in 1925, the Wildcat and Twister wooden roller coasters in 1926, the Land of Oz children's section in 1934, and the Shooting Star roller coaster (a renovation of the former Clipper roller coaster) in 1947.

Coney Island became a Cincinnati institution. It was desegregated after being sued in 1952 by Marian Spencer. The park's proximity to the river made it prone to frequent flooding. In 1968, park management entered into talks with Taft Broadcasting for the purpose of developing a new park on higher ground. Taft responded by buying Coney Island outright in 1969, and construction began the following year on a new site located in Deerfield Township of Warren County 25 miles (40 km) north of Cincinnati along Interstate 71. Coney Island closed its amusements on September 6, 1971, as most of its rides were moved to the newly completed Kings Island theme park.

After Kings Island opened in 1972, Taft Broadcasting intended to sell Coney Island's land for redevelopment. However, with the company's decision to open another theme park in Virginia (Kings Dominion) and its acquisition of Carowinds on the North Carolina-South Carolina border, the property's redevelopment became a low priority. Less than two years after closing, Coney Island reopened permanently in 1973. The park was only a shadow of its former self but still featured several popular attractions. The Sunlite Pool helped Coney Island remain a popular summertime destination.

The park donated 15 acres (61,000 m^{2}) of land for the construction of Riverbend Music Center which opened in 1984. The land was the former location of the Wildcat and Shooting Star roller coasters. The Riverbend amphitheater serves as the summer home of the Cincinnati Symphony and Pops Orchestras, as well as a concert venue for other musical acts. In 1991, Coney Island was purchased by Cincinnati businessman Ronald Walker. No longer held back by a corporate entity, management was able to restore Coney Island as a traditional amusement park with familiar rides such as the "Tilt-A-Whirl", bumper cars, carnival games and musical shows.

Coney Island announced plans to remove all amusement rides from the park on September 21, 2019, but continued to operate as a water park featuring the Sunlite Pool and other water-related attractions. The decision was based on attendance, consumer feedback, and rising costs associated with maintaining ride operation.

On December 14, 2023, the park announced that it would be sold to Music and Event Management, Inc. (MEMI), a subsidiary of the Cincinnati Symphony Orchestra, with plans to redevelop the property into a multi-use venue with sports, dining, and entertainment. Demolition proceeded in early 2024 despite a failed grassroots effort to save the Sunlite Pool and the surrounding property.

== List of attractions ==
=== Sunlite Water Adventure ===
Attraction	Opened	Description
Cannonball Cove	2019	A separate pool for diving located near Sunlite Pool that features two 3-foot (0.91 m) diving boards and a 9-foot (2.7 m) diving board.
Challenge Zone	2021	Large floating obstacle course featuring more than 150 feet (46 m) of obstacles.
Cyclone	2006	A 70-foot (21 m) enclosed body slide located near the deep end of Sunlite Pool.
Silver Bullet	1945	A speed slide that sends its riders splashing into the main area of Sunlite Pool.
Sunlite Pool	1925	The nation's largest recirculating pool.
The Twister	2009	Named after the Twister wooden roller coaster that operated at the park from 1926 through 1936, Twister is a four-slide attraction that features two body slides and two inner tube slides.

=== Family attractions ===
Attraction	Opened	Description
Action Alley	2022	Giant inflatable jump pad, soccer darts, cornhole, and more.
Cincy Mini-Golf	Unknown	Miniature golf course.
Storybook Paddle Boats	Unknown	Paddle boats; located on Lake Como.

=== Pre-1972 ===
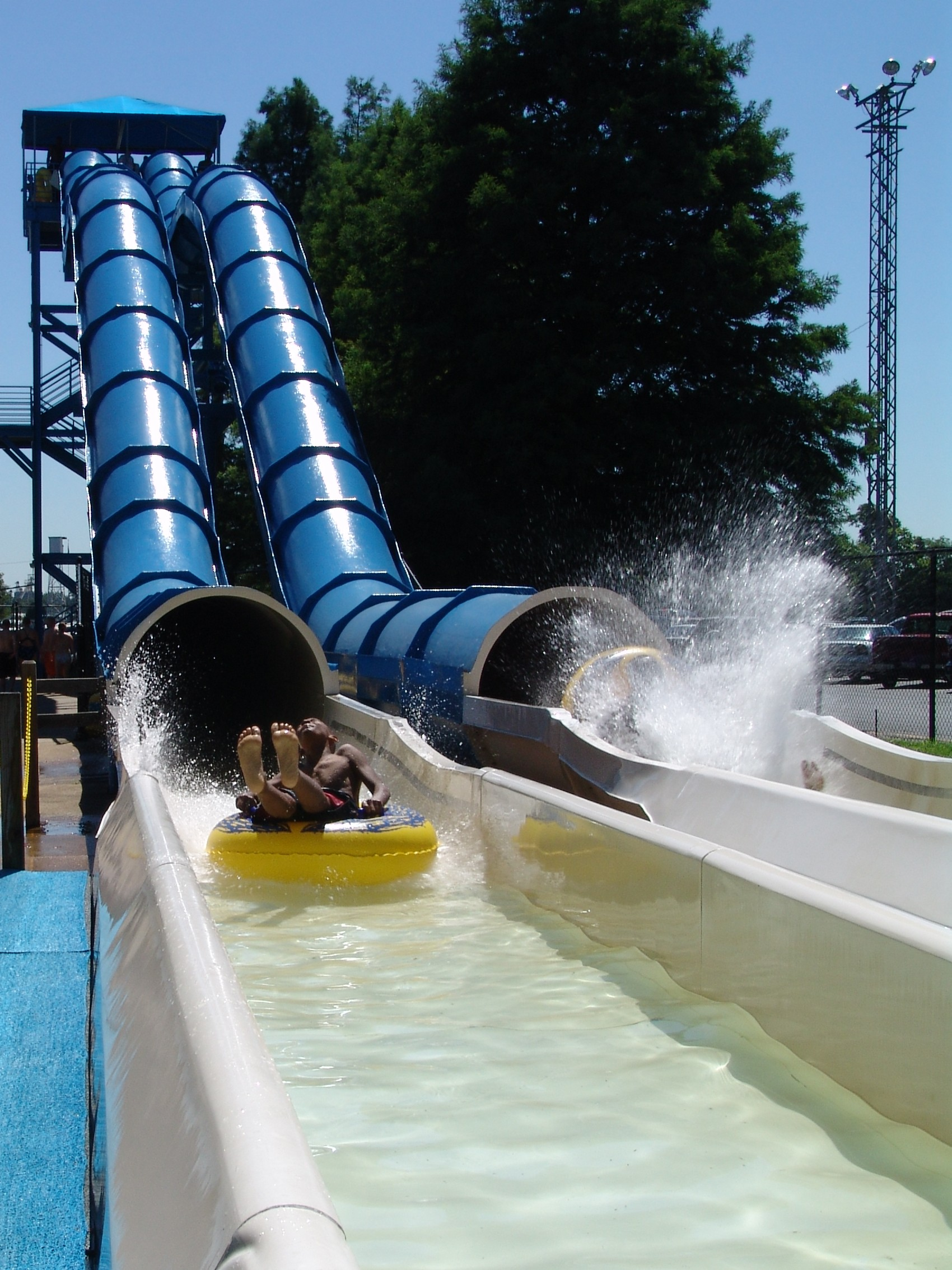
The former Pipeline Plunge, later replaced by Cannonball Cove.

List of former attractions pre-1972
Attraction	Manufacturer (Model)	Opened	Closed	Description
Batman's Bat Cave	(Dark Ride)	1966	1967	Re-theme of The Spook. Designed by Arrow Development. Themed to Batman. Replaced with Haunted House.
Bluebeard's Castle	(Funhouse)	1927	Closed	Funhouse with stunts including a tilted room with the walls, ceiling, and floor at different angles. Facade included two over-sized heads, with one as the entrance and the other as the exit. Attraction was a partnership between Frank Thomas and George Sinclair.
Brain Trust	(Funhouse)	1930s	Closed	Located on the Mall.
Calypso	Mack Rides (Calypso)	1963	1965	Spinning flat ride imported from Germany. Covered with 5,500 red and white lights. Replaced by Cloud 9.
Carousel	Philadelphia Toboggan Company (Carousel)	1926	1971	Classic carousel with 48 hand-carved wooden horses and two chariots. Originally opened in building that had housed the park's previous carousel before being relocated within the park to a newer building designed by the Philadelphia Toboggan Company in 1932. Carousel #79 from manufacturer. Originally painted with more than 20,000 sheets of 23-karat (96%) gold and 1,000 sheets of sterling silver. A 68-year-old woman fell from the ride in 1947 and died. Completely refurbished in 1969 at a cost of $50,000. Relocated to Kings Island as Carousel, today known as Grand Carousel. Ride's structure remained in place until it was demolished in 1985.
Caterpillar	(Caterpillar)	1924	Closed	Classic Caterpillar attraction. Installed by J.J. Schmid with a five year lease.
Chase Me	(Kiddie Auto)	1934	Closed	Children's ride located in the Land of Oz. Included vehicles themed to automobiles, fire engines, and police cars.
Circle Swing	Harry Traver and Rudyard S. Uzzell (Circle Swing)	1900s	Closed - 1944 or later	Large circle swing originally built on a small island in Lake Como. Identified under various names, including Circle Swing, The Rockets, and Flying Tigers. Originally had six wicker basket ride vehicles which were replaced with small wooden airplanes in the 1920s. Relocated within park in 1926. Airplanes replaced with rockets (built in-house) for 1938 season. Rockets repainted to resemble Flying Tigers airplanes for 1942 season.
Clipper	Philadelphia Toboggan Company(Wooden Coaster)	1937	1946	A twisted wooden roller coaster designed by Herbert Schmeck. Skyrocket's machinery was saved for use on this ride. Featured an art deco-style loading station. Nicknamed Greased Lightning. Segments of the ride, including its loading station, lift, and final spiral helix, were retained for the construction of Shooting Star.
Cloud 9	Chance Rides (Trabant)	1966	Closed	Trabant attraction that replaced Calypso.
Coney Island and Lake Como Railroad	Chance Rides (Miniature Railway)	1964	1971	Miniature railway over Lake Como on a 462-foot (141 m) trestle and into the adjoining woods. Included settler and Native American figurines created by Special Effects Company of Morrison, Colorado. Victorian-style station designed by University of Cincinnati graduate Darrel Daniels. Engines named after Mad Anthony Wayne (#34) and George Rogers Clark (#35). Trains were stored overnight in the ride's two tunnels. $10,000 of new effects added for 1966 season, including a grizzly bear, a fort, and additional Native American figurines. After ride closed, #34 was relocated to World of Golf in Florence, Kentucky and later Oil Ranch in Hockley, Texas. #35 eventually found its way to Guntown Mountain Railroad near Mammoth Cave, Kentucky before being put in storage at Beech Bend Park.
Crazy Orbit	Hrubetz (Round-Up)	1960	Closed	A spinning flat ride that tilted riders upward.
Cuddle Up	Philadelphia Toboggan Company (Cuddle Up)	1930	1971	A spinning flat ride. Relocated to Kings Island.
Devil's Dips	T.M. Harton Company (Wooden Coaster)	1913	Closed	Opening delayed until June 22, 1913, due to large flood. Twisted, figure-eight style roller coaster.
Devil's Kitchen	(Funhouse)	1927	Closed	Funhouse. Replaced Noah's Ark but retained the rocking structure design. Visitors entered through Satan's mouth.
Dip the Dips (1)	T.M. Harton Company (Wooden Coaster)	1911	1918	Roller coaster built by T.M. Harton. Operated by the Coney Island Dips Co.
Dip the Dips (2)	T.M. Harton Company (Wooden Coaster)	1918	1925	Roller Coaster built by T.M. Harton that replaced the previous coaster of the same name. Reconstructed with a higher hill and more dips in the early 1920s. Replaced by Twister.
Dodgem	(Bumper Cars)	1920s	1971	Standard bumper-car attraction. Also referred to as Skooter. Originally owned by A.H. Light of Cincinnati and located in a dome-shaped structure built by John A. Miller of Miller and Baker. Housed in the same structure as Cuddle Up and The Whip. New cars added in 1967. Relocated to Kings Island.
Doodle Bug	(Children's Ride)	Unknown	Unknown	Children's ride in the Land of Oz.
Ferris Wheel	Eli Bridge Company (Ferris Wheel)	1925	Closed (1937 or later)	No. 16 model Ferris Wheel with sixteen carriages.
Figure 8	(Wooden Coaster)	1900s	1918	Roller coaster built by T.M. Harton.
Flying American	(Ferris Wheel)	1888	Closed	24-foot tall Ferris Wheel with six carriages. Constructed of wood and iron. Operated by Albert Heninchen, who disassembled the ride in the off-season and operated it inside a swim club in the city.
Flying Scooter	Bisch-Rocco (Flying Scooters)	1940	1971	A spinning ride with suspended cars that riders could control. New cars added to ride in 1960. Relocated to Kings Island (1972–2004) and later to Carowinds (2005-Present).
Galaxi	S.D.C. (Galaxi)	1970	1971	A compact Galaxi steel roller coaster. Relocated to Kings Island (1972–1978) as Bavarian Beetle.
Giggler		1908	Closed	Enclosed ride with eccentric motion.
Goofy House	(Funhouse)	<=1932	Closed	Funhouse with a castle facade. Replaced Morro Castle. Rethemed into Streets of Paris by Ernest Anderson.
Haunted House	(Dark Ride)	1968	1971	Dark ride that replaced Bat Cave. Created by Coney and Richard Harsley. Updated in 1969 with new $10,000 sound system and audio.
Haunted Swing, The	(Madhouse)	1890s	Closed	An "illusion" ride where people would enter a small building and get on a swing. The building revolved around the swing, creating the illusion that the guests had inverted.
Hegler Coaster	(Wooden Coaster)	1880s	Closed	Small wooden roller coaster, comparable to those at Coney Island. Named after park president J.D. Hegler and possibly built under the La Marcus Thompson patents. Enlarged for the 1888 season.
Helicopter	Allan Herschell	1960	1971	Children's ride with miniature helicopters. Helicopters replaced with large kangaroos in 1967. Ride relocated to Kings Island as Kikki Kangaroo.
Hell and Back	(Funhouse)	1930s	Closed	Designed and built by Langdon McCormick. One effect was a room that appeared to be on fire. The facade was given "demonical lighting effects" at night. Located across the Mall from Goofy House.
House of Mysteries	(Funhouse)	1935	Closed	Funhouse.
Indian Mystery	(Funhouse)	1956	1956	Funhouse with Native American theming. Replaced the Mirror Maze. Replaced by Scrambler.
Jack and Jill	(Slide)	1929	1932	Spiraling slide that passengers rode down on woven mats. Passengers rode to the top on escalator seats. Slide removed after many park guests had sustained injuries on it, including George Schott's daughter.
Jolly Caterpillar		1960	Closed	Children's ride with a "bucking" action as the ride traveled in a circle.
Jungle, The	(Funhouse)	1930s	Closed (1938 or earlier)	Funhouse located on the Mall. Designed by Ernest Anderson and featured a jungle motif and sounds. Building used for The Coney Dog, Pony, and Monkey Circus in 1939.
Junior Turnpike	(Miniature Turnpike)	1957	Closed	Miniature version of the larger Turnpike, added into the Land of Oz.
Kinder Karousel	(Carousel)	1962	Closed	Carousel with automobiles and motorcycles. Imported from Germany. Scenes around outside repainted in 1967.
Laff-in-the-Dark	Traver Engineering (Dark Ride)	1932	1960	Classic dark ride with small, powered cars from Traver Engineering and a building designed by Philadelphia Toboggan Company. The 850-foot (260 m) track included stunts like a skeleton in a coffin, a jumping lion, a dancing girl, and the devil.
Leaping Lena	Allan Herschell Company	1930	Closed	62-foot circular ride with 12 small racing cars. "Drivers" could steer their cars to avoid or hit bumps by moving into or away from the center of the ride. The attraction was likely owned by a concessionaire and only remained at the park for one or two season.
Lindy Loop	Spillman Manufacturing Company	1930	Closed	Caterpillar type ride with the tunnel removed, swinging cars, and seats that faced each other.
Little Dipper	(Wooden Coaster)	19??	19??	Roller coaster
Log Flume	Arrow Development (Log flume)	1968	1971	Log flume ride marketed as park's most expensive addition ever at $500,000. Relocated to Kings Island as Kings Mill Log Flume. The ride was partially rebuilt for the 2001 season and is now known as Race For Your Life Charlie Brown.
Loop-the-Loop	Spillman Engineering Company	1930s	Closed	Caged ride where passengers would swing back-and-forth until they were able to complete a full loop around the structure.
Lost River	Philadelphia Toboggan Company (Shoot-the-Chute)	1928	1971	Originally known as The Cascades. Shoot-the-chute ride that started with a dark, winding tunnel with illuminated scenes before going up a hill and down a curving drop into a pool of water. Facade included a windmill and large artificial facade. The ride was similar to but larger than the former Mystic Mill Chutes. Ride renovated and renamed to Lost River in 1941. A new facade was built and the drop was removed, but due to lack of popularity a new, larger drop was added in 1942.
Mirror Maze	(Funhouse)	1947	1955	Re-theme of The Show Boat. Included new stunts and a screened-in skirt-blower-upper gag. Replaced by Indian Mystery.
Monster	Eyerly Aircraft Company (Monster)	1968	1971	Traditional "Octopus" ride that spins in three different circles at the same time. While it quickly raises and lowers riders as their cars continue to spin. Replaced the penny arcade. Relocated to Kings Island and now known as Monster.
Moon Rocket	Spillman Engineering Corp.	1942	1946	Circular spinning ride. Replaced with Caterpillar.
Morro Castle	(Funhouse)	1930s	Closed	First of many new funhouses built at Coney Island in the 1930s. Exterior covered with minarets. Replaced by Goofy House.
Mystic Mill Chute	(Shoot the Chutes / Old Mill)	1922	1931	Combination shoot the chutes and Old Mill ride built by George Sinclair and Frank Thomas. Included a large windmill on top and small wooden boats propelled through tunnels by a large paddle wheel. Featured a roller coaster style ending with a chain lift hill and a drop into water. Ride removed several years after The Cascades was built when it could no longer contend with the newer, larger attraction.
Noah's Ark	(Funhouse)	1926	1927	Funhouse themed to Biblical story of Noah's Ark. Owned by Charles McDonald. Included large rocking ship with a giraffe, elephant, and Noah looking out its windows. Replaced by Devil's Kitchen, which re-used the rocking mechanism.
Old '99	Chance Rides (Miniature Train)	1969	Closed	Miniature train for children.
Olympic Bobs	Chance Rides (Olympic Bobs)	1968	1969	A Bayern Kurve style flat ride that accelerated guests around an angled track at high speeds.
Pony Express	(Pony Carts)	1934	Closed	Children's ride located in the Land of Oz.
Rotor	(Rotor)	1955	Closed	A stick-to-the-walls spinning flat ride. Attained a speed of approximately 25 revolutions per minute.
Rotor (2)	Chance Rides (Rotor)	1969	1971	A stick-to-the-walls spinning flat ride. Relocated to Kings Island.
Round-Up	(Children's Ride)	1934	Closed	Children's ride in the Land of Oz with pigs, goats, and broncos.
Rub-a-Dub-Dub	(Children's Ride)	1941	Closed	Children's ride located in the Land of Oz.
Serpentine Railway	(Miniature Railway)	1900s	Closed	Miniature railway. Signage also referred to it as "Miniature Ry."
Scenic Railway	(Scenic Railway)	1898	Closed	Included a tunnel. Assumed to have replaced the Hegler Coaster.
Scrambler	Eli Bridge Company (Scrambler)	1957	1959 or later	Spinning flat ride that replaced the Indian Mystery funhouse. A 10-year-old rider was struck by the ride and killed its opening year.
Scrambler (2)	Eli Bridge Company (Scrambler)	1969	1971	Traditional amusement-park ride manufactured by Eli Bridge Company. Three arms spin riders giving them the sensation of almost hitting the wall. Relocated to Kings Island.
Shoot the Chutes	(Shoot the Chutes)	1890s	1898	Shoot-the-chutes into Lake Como. Built by William Ward Devore and also known as Coasting Launch.
Shoot the Chutes (2)	(Shoot the Chutes)	1899	1910	Said to cost $10,000. Passengers ascended and descended the hill in the same boat, unlike its predecessor.
Shoot the Chutes (3)	(Shoot the Chutes)	1911	1913	Rebuild of former Shoot the Chutes; larger than its predecessor. Destroyed by fire on June 17, 1913.
Shoot the Chutes (4)	(Shoot the Chutes)	1910s	1921	Replaced Shoot the Chutes that was destroyed by fire in 1913. Received new, faster sled-bottomed boats for 1916 season. Removed alongside addition of Mystic Mill Chute in 1922.
Shooting Star	(Wooden Coaster)	1947	1971	Wooden roller coaster that re-used the station, lift, and final spiral helix of the Clipper. Included nine new hills to connect the ends. The ride was 88 feet (27 m) tall, 2,950 feet (900 m) feet long, and reached a maximum speed of approximately 43 miles per hour (69 km/h). Designed by Herbert Schmeck. A 40-year-old woman was ejected from the ride and fell to her death in May 1947 shortly after the ride opened. A large new marquee with 3,500 light bulbs was added in 1963. An 18-year-old man fell to his death from the ride in 1966.
Showboat, The	(Funhouse)	1936	1946	At times referred to as The Show Boat. Funhouse designed by Paul G. Hill and built to resemble a river steamboat. Replaced Sky Rocket. Included a Laffing Sal figure dubbed "Show Boat Sal" and an exposed second level with jets of air which would expose unsuspecting guests in skirts or dresses. Renovated into Mirror Maze in 1947.
Sky Diver	Chance Rides (Sky Diver)	1966	1960s	Sometimes referred to as Skydiver. Large thrill ride that resembled a Ferris Wheel but inverted passengers. Cost the park $55,000.
Sky Fighters		1954	Closed	Children's ride located in the Land of Oz.
Sky Rocket	(Wooden Coaster)	1921	1935 or earlier	At times referred to as Skyrocket or Greyhound. Roller coaster designed by John A Miller. Featured an under-the-track wheel system which locked the cars to the track. Ride included fourteen dips and allegedly cost $40,000. Frank Thomas was in charge of its construction. Ride was rebuilt in mid-1920s with a first drop that took passengers all the way to the ground and a modified back turn. Ride replaced with Show Boat funhouse. Ride's machinery saved for use on Clipper.
Sky Slide	(Mat Slide)	1969	1971	Giant slide. Relocated to Kings Island (1972–1995) as Flying Carpet and later Scrappy's Slides.
Skyride	Von Roll (Sky Ride)	1965	1971	A cable-car skyride. Built in Berne, Switzerland and shipped in six different freighters. 1,200 feet (370 m) long with three towers, the tallest being 96 feet (29 m) high. Included 32 gondola cars. One station was themed as an alpine chalet. Relocated to Kings Island (1972–1979). One station remained standing at Coney Island until it was demolished for the addition of Riverbend Music Center in 1984.
Space Ship		1954	Closed	Children's ride located in the Land of Oz.
Spook, The	Arrow Development(Dark Ride)	1960	1965	Dark ride with collection of comical and scary stunts. Ride vehicles were four-seat cars that resembled old-time automobiles. Ride re-themed into Batman's Bat Cave for 1966 season.
Streets of Paris	(Funhouse)	1930s	Closed	Funhouse located on the Mall. A retheme of the former Goofy House by Ernest Anderson. Included scenes themed to sewers and catacombs.
Swan	(Children's Old Mill)	1934	Closed	A children's old mill with swan-shaped boats.
Teddy Bear	Philadelphia Toboggan Company(Wooden Coaster)	1935	1971	Junior wooden coaster designed by Herbert Schmeck.
Toonerville Trolley		1935	Closed	Children's ride added to the Land of Oz.
Tumble Bug	Traver Engineering (Tumble Bug	1925	1971	A 1920s Harry Traver classic that pulled five linked cars around an undulating circular track, similar to Turtle at Kennywood Park. Relocated within park in 1926. Cars and mechanical components relocated to Kings Island (1972–1985), but original track remained at Coney Island.
Turnpike	Streifthau Manufacturing Company / Arrow Development(Turnpike)	1958	1971	Added at a cost of $100,000. Traveled around and over Lake Como and was 1,875 feet (572 m) long. Cars ran between two external rails. Light poles installed every 60 feet (18 m) along the track. Cars from Arrow Development and a center guide rail added in 1966.
Twister	Philadelphia Toboggan Company (Wooden Coaster)	1926	1936	Enclosed wooden roller coaster. Designed by Herbert Paul Schmeck. Serial number 53 or 54. Replaced Dip the Dips. By 1929 parts of the ride's enclosure had been removed.
Water Cycle	Custer Specialty Company	1930s	Closed	Watercraft in Lake Como that passengers could pedal like a boat.
Water Whirl		1910s	Closed	Ride located in Lake Como.
Whip	W.F. Mangels Company (Whip)	Unknown - 1937 or earlier	1955	Classic Whip attraction. Survived the 1937 flood. Replaced by newer model in 1956.
Whip	(Whip)	1956	1971	Replaced previous version of attraction.
Whirlpool	William Ward Devore	1908	Closed	Enclosed ride that included mysterious caves.
Wildcat	(Wooden Coaster)	1926	1964	Wooden roller coaster designed by Herbert Paul Schmeck. New entrance and cars with headlights added for 1956 season. Removed to make way for the Skyride.
Wild Mouse	B.A. Schiff & Associates (Wild Mouse)	1958	1969	Wild mouse roller coaster with a series of tight turns.
Zoomer	Custer Specialty Company Inc.	1927	1931	Suspended monorail type ride with six individually powered cars that were connected as a train and navigated a winding track. The ride never proved popular and was considered slow and jerky by its riders.
Unknown - Junior Whip	William F. Mangels	1967	1971	Classic Whip Jr. ride designed by William F. Mangels. Relocated to Kings Island and now known as Linus' Beetle Bugs.
Unknown - 1902 Roller Coaster	(Roller Coaster)	1902	Closed	Traveled from riverbank through grove and almost to Lake Como. Makers claimed it was the longest and fastest roller coaster that could be built.
Unknown - Children's Carousel	(Carousel)	1967	Unknown	Miniature children's carousel.
Unknown - Turtles	(Miniature Tumble Bug)	1967	1971	Miniature Tumble Bug attraction. Relocated to Kings Island as Squiddly Diddly.
Unknown - Hampton	Hampton Amusements Corporation	1969	1971	Miniature carousel-car ride designed by Hampton Amusement Corporation. Relocated to Kings Island and now known as PEANUTS Off-Road Rally.
Unknown - Children's Electric Train 1	(Electric Train)	1932	Closed	Installed behind the new Carousel building as part of child's playground.
Unknown - Children's Electric Train 2	(Electric Train)	1935	Closed	Added into the Land of Oz.
Unknown - Merry-Go-Round	(Carousel)	1800s	Unknown	Park's first ride; a mule-powered merry-go-round with wooden horses suspended from the ceiling.
Unknown - Merry-Go-Round	T.M. Harton Company (Carousel)	1911	1925	Operated by the Coney Island Caroussel & Bldg. Company with figures carved by Daniel Muller. Refurbished in early 1920s. Replaced with Philadelphia Toboggan Company Carousel #79 in 1926.

=== Post-1972 ===
List of former attractions post-1972
Attraction	Manufacturer (Model)	Opened	Closed	Description
Baby Bumper Boats	(Bumper Boats)	1989	2004	
Bumper Boats	(Bumper Boats)	1990	2013	Replaced by Como Cruisers.
Carousel	Chance Rides (Carousel)	1998	2019	Merry Go Round consisting of 30 horses and two chariots.
Como Cruisers		2013	2018	Battery-powered boats. Replaced with swan and dragon styled paddle boats.
Dodgems	(Bumper Cars)	2000	2019	Oval-shaped bumper cars ride with a center island. A one-way sign is posted, although it is not always followed.
EuroBungy		2010	2019	Bungee Trampoline Attraction; riders are attached to bungee cords and can jump onto a trampoline inside a dome, it is only available on certain days.
Ferris Wheel	Eli Bridge Company (Ferris Wheel)	1990	2019	Ferris Wheel; riders ascend 40 feet (12 m) into the air above Lake Como.
Flying Bobs	Chance Rides (Matterhorn)	1994	2019	Purchased used. Relocated to Indiana Beach.
Frog Hopper	S&S Power (Frog Hopper)	2003	2019	Bouncing spring ride with a frog theme.
Giant Slide	(Mat Slide)	2001	2019	Giant Slide or Fun Slide; three-lane, approximately 25 feet (7.6 m)-tall Giant Slide.
Helicopters		1994	Closed	Miniature helicopters.
Kiddie Circle Freeway		199?	2007	Carousel-car ride relocated from Kings Island.
Krazy Kars		1989	Closed	
Pipeline Plunge		1994	2018	Pipeline Plunge is a dual enclosed innertube slide. It replaced the Zzip. It was revamped during the 2011 season including new floats in which you lie on your stomach while riding down the flumes. It was removed before the 2019 season began and replaced by Cannonball Cove.
Python		1999	2019	Compact steel roller coaster; relocated from Splash Zone Water Park (1996–1999)
River Runner	(Swinging Ship)	2008	2019	Pirate Ship; relocated from Wild West World after its closure. Canoe-themed.
Rock-O-Plane	Eyerly Aircraft Company (Rock-O-Plane)	2007	2019	Originally opened at Americana/Lesourdesville Lake Amusement Park in 1949.
Scrambler	Eli Bridge Company (Scrambler)	1991	2019	Classic spinning flat ride.
Scream Machine	Moser (Spring Ride)	2005	2019	50 feet (15 m)-tall free fall
Sky Fighters			Closed	Relocated from defunct Fantasy Farm park.
Spin-A-Ree		1994	Closed	
Super Round Up	(Round-Up)	1993	2019	Spinning flat ride that tilts upwards.
Super Slide	Dartron Industries (Mat Slide)	2001	Closed	
Spin-A-Ree		1994	2007	
TopSpin	SBF Visa Group (Midi Dance Party 360)	2015	2019	SBF Visa Group Midi Dance Party 360.
Tilt-A-Whirl	(Tilt-a-Whirl)	1992	2019	Standard Tilt-A-Whirl painted green and purple. Relocated from defunct Fantasy Farm park.
Tempest	Grover Watkins (Tempest)	2001	2019	"A tornado-like whirling dervish that cannot be found anywhere else in the state of Ohio." Relocated from Americana/Lesourdesville Lake Amusement Park.
Trabant		1993	2010	Replaced by Wipeout
Wipeout	Moser Rides	2014	2019	Spinning Lift Ride; opened at Coney Island in 2014, flips riders upside down in circles 20 feet in the air.
Zoom Flume	(Waterslide)	1977	2008	Zoom Flume, which had wooden supports, was the first of Sunlite Pool's large slides. It was removed at the end of the 2008 season and replaced by The Twister.
Zzip		1984	1993	The Zzip was similar to its successor, the Pipeline Plunge.

== Events ==
Over the years, Coney Island hosted a number of annual festivals including the Summerfair Arts Festival, the Cincinnati Celtic World Festival, the Appalachian Festival, and the Cincinnati Flower and Farm Fest. Concerts were also occasionally held in the Moonlite Gardens area of the park.

Scenes from the 1968-1970 children's TV show The Banana Splits were filmed at Coney Island.
