= 1979 Grand Prix (tennis) =

Professional tennis circuit

1979 Grand Prix circuit
Details
- Duration: 1 January 1979 – 24 December 1979
- Edition: 10th
- Tournaments: 91

Achievements (singles)
- Most titles: (Sweden) Björn Borg (12)
- Most finals: (Sweden) Björn Borg (13)
- Prize money leader: (United States) John McEnroe
- Points leader: (United States) John McEnroe

Awards
- Player of the year: (Sweden) Björn Borg
- Comeback player of the year: (United States) Arthur Ashe

The 1979 Colgate-Palmolive Grand Prix was a professional tennis circuit held that year. It consisted of four Grand Slam tournaments, the Grand Prix tournaments and the Nations Cup, a team event.

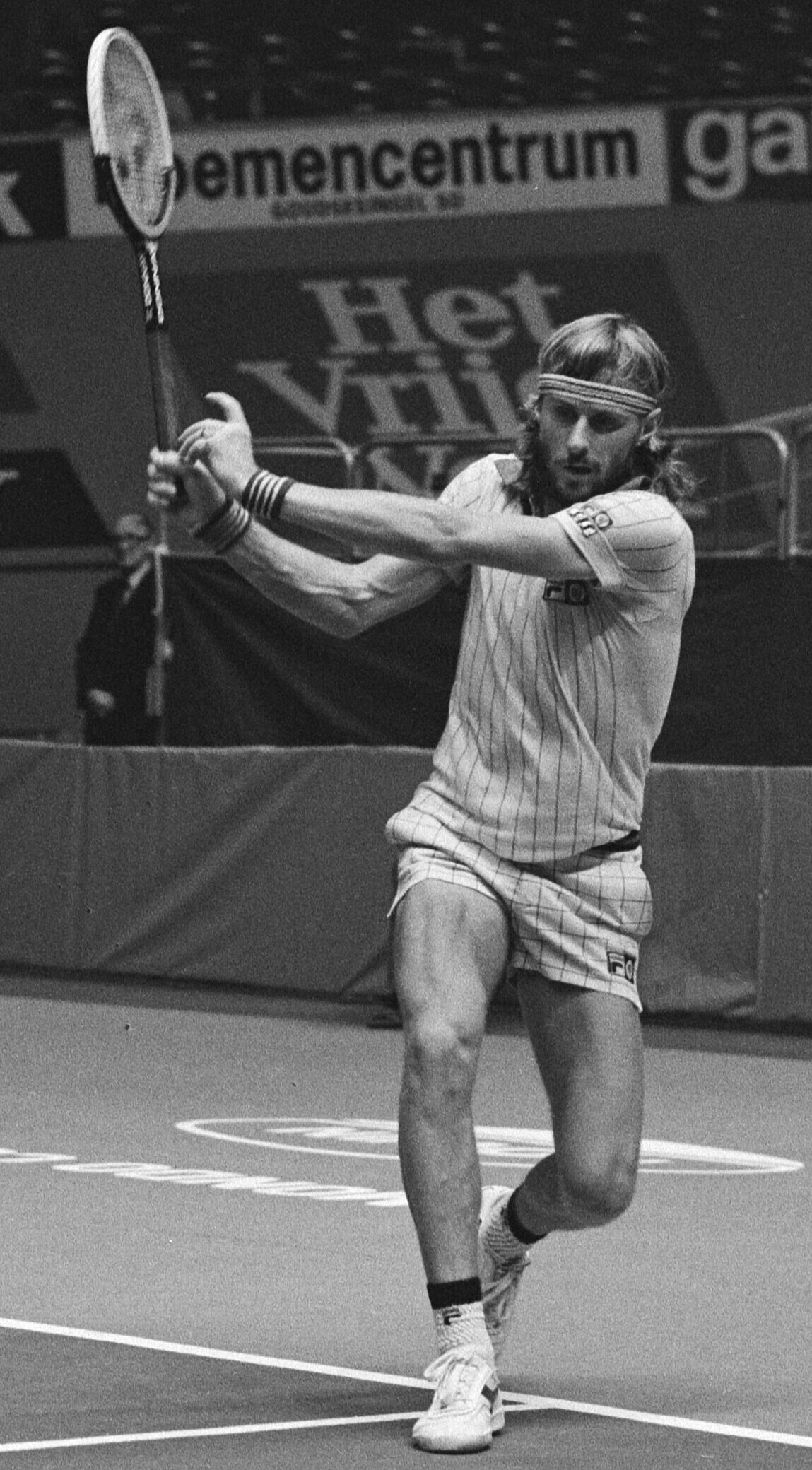
Björn Borg finished the year as ATP world No. 1 for the first time in his career. Borg won twelve titles during the season, including two majors at the French Open and the Wimbledon Championships, as well as the Masters Grand Prix.

== Schedule ==
The table below shows the 1979 Colgate-Palmolive Grand Prix schedule.

Key

Grand Slam tournaments
Tour finals
Super Series
Regular Series

=== January ===
Week	Tournament	Champions	Runners-up	Semifinalists	Quarterfinalists
1 Jan	Australian Hardcourt Championships; Hobart, Australia; Hard – $50,000 – 32S/16D	(Argentina) Guillermo Vilas; 6–4, 6–4	(Australia) Mark Edmondson	(Australia) Phil Dent (Australia) Allan Stone	(Australia) Terry Rocavert (Australia) Chris Kachel (Australia) Bob Giltinan (Australia) Bob Carmichael
1 Jan	Australian Hardcourt Championships; Hobart, Australia; Hard – $50,000 – 32S/16D	(Australia) Phil Dent (Australia) Bob Giltinan; 8–6	(Argentina) Guillermo Vilas (Romania) Ion Țiriac	(Australia) Phil Dent (Australia) Allan Stone	(Australia) Terry Rocavert (Australia) Chris Kachel (Australia) Bob Giltinan (Australia) Bob Carmichael
1 Jan	Benson & Hedges Open; Auckland, New Zealand; Hard – $50,000 – 32S/16D; Singles	(United States) Tim Wilkison; 6–3, 6–7, 6–4, 2–6, 6–2	(Austria) Peter Feigl	(United Kingdom) Andrew Jarrett (United Kingdom) Richard Lewis	(Australia) Rod Frawley (India) Ramesh Krishnan (Australia) Charlie Fancutt (Australia) Kim Warwick
1 Jan	Benson & Hedges Open; Auckland, New Zealand; Hard – $50,000 – 32S/16D; Singles	(South Africa) Bernard Mitton (Australia) Kim Warwick; 6–3, 2–6, 6–3	(United Kingdom) Andrew Jarrett (United Kingdom) Jonathan Smith	(United Kingdom) Andrew Jarrett (United Kingdom) Richard Lewis	(Australia) Rod Frawley (India) Ramesh Krishnan (Australia) Charlie Fancutt (Australia) Kim Warwick
1 Jan	Braniff Airways World Doubles Championship (WCT); London, England; Carpet (i) – $200,000 – D8	(United States) John McEnroe (United States) Peter Fleming; 3–6, 6–2, 6–3, 6–1	(Romania) Ilie Năstase (United States) Sherwood Stewart		
15 Jan	First National Classic; Baltimore, Maryland, US; Carpet (i) – $75,000 – 32S/16D	(United States) Harold Solomon; 7–5, 6–4	(United States) Marty Riessen	(Rhodesia) Andrew Pattison (United States) Peter Fleming	(United States) Ferdi Taygan (United States) Tom Gorman (United States) John Sadri (United States) Roscoe Tanner
15 Jan	First National Classic; Baltimore, Maryland, US; Carpet (i) – $75,000 – 32S/16D	(United States) Sherwood Stewart (United States) Marty Riessen; 7–6, 6–4	(India) Anand Amritraj (South Africa) Cliff Drysdale	(Rhodesia) Andrew Pattison (United States) Peter Fleming	(United States) Ferdi Taygan (United States) Tom Gorman (United States) John Sadri (United States) Roscoe Tanner
15 Jan	Birmingham WCT; Birmingham, Alabama, US; Carpet (i) – $175,000 – 32S/16D	(United States) Jimmy Connors; 6–2, 3–6, 7–5	(United States) Eddie Dibbs	(United States) Vitas Gerulaitis (Argentina) Guillermo Vilas	(United States) Stan Smith (Romania) Ilie Năstase (United States) Dick Stockton (United Kingdom) Buster Mottram
15 Jan	Birmingham WCT; Birmingham, Alabama, US; Carpet (i) – $175,000 – 32S/16D	(United States) Dick Stockton (United States) Stan Smith; 6–2, 6–3	(Romania) Ilie Năstase (Netherlands) Tom Okker	(United States) Vitas Gerulaitis (Argentina) Guillermo Vilas	(United States) Stan Smith (Romania) Ilie Năstase (United States) Dick Stockton (United Kingdom) Buster Mottram
22 Jan	US Pro Indoor (WCT); Philadelphia, Pennsylvania, US; Carpet (i) – $250,000 – 64S/32D; Singles – Doubles	(United States) Jimmy Connors; 6–3, 6–4, 6–1	(United States) Arthur Ashe	(United States) Roscoe Tanner (United States) Vitas Gerulaitis	(Australia) Geoff Masters (United States) John McEnroe (United States) Harold Solomon (United States) Brian Gottfried
22 Jan	US Pro Indoor (WCT); Philadelphia, Pennsylvania, US; Carpet (i) – $250,000 – 64S/32D; Singles – Doubles	(Netherlands) Tom Okker (Poland) Wojciech Fibak; 5–7, 6–1, 6–3	(United States) Peter Fleming (United States) John McEnroe	(United States) Roscoe Tanner (United States) Vitas Gerulaitis	(Australia) Geoff Masters (United States) John McEnroe (United States) Harold Solomon (United States) Brian Gottfried
29 Jan	Fairfield Bay Classic; Little Rock, Arkansas, US; Hard (i) – $50,000 – 32S/16D	(United States) Vitas Gerulaitis; 6–2, 6–2	(United States) Butch Walts	(Australia) John James (United States) Bill Scanlon	(United States) John Sadri (United States) Hank Pfister (Australia) Colin Dibley (South Africa) Johan Kriek
29 Jan	Fairfield Bay Classic; Little Rock, Arkansas, US; Hard (i) – $50,000 – 32S/16D	(United States) Vitas Gerulaitis (Czechoslovakia) Vladimír Zedník; 5–7, 6–3, 7–5	(Australia) Phil Dent (Australia) Colin Dibley	(Australia) John James (United States) Bill Scanlon	(United States) John Sadri (United States) Hank Pfister (Australia) Colin Dibley (South Africa) Johan Kriek
29 Jan	United Virginia Bank Classic (WCT); Richmond, Virginia, US; Carpet (i) – $175,000 – 32S/16D	(Sweden) Björn Borg; 6–3, 6–1	(Argentina) Guillermo Vilas	(United States) John McEnroe (United States) Arthur Ashe	(United States) Pat DuPré (Romania) Ilie Năstase (United States) Brian Gottfried (United States) Tim Wilkison
29 Jan	United Virginia Bank Classic (WCT); Richmond, Virginia, US; Carpet (i) – $175,000 – 32S/16D	(United States) John McEnroe (United States) Brian Gottfried; 6–4, 6–3	(Romania) Ion Țiriac (Argentina) Guillermo Vilas	(United States) John McEnroe (United States) Arthur Ashe	(United States) Pat DuPré (Romania) Ilie Năstase (United States) Brian Gottfried (United States) Tim Wilkison

=== February ===
Week	Tournament	Champions	Runners-up	Semifinalists	Quarterfinalists
5 Feb	Pepsi Grand Slam; Boca Raton, Florida, US; Clay – $300,000 – S4	(Sweden) Björn Borg; 6–2, 6–3	(United States) Jimmy Connors	(United States) John McEnroe (Argentina) Guillermo Vilas	
12 Feb	Congoleum Classic; Rancho Mirage, California, US; Hard – $250,000 – 64S/32D	(United States) Roscoe Tanner; 6–4, 6–2	(United States) Brian Gottfried	(United States) Eliot Teltscher (United States) Harold Solomon	(United States) Jimmy Connors (Australia) Colin Dibley (Poland) Wojciech Fibak (Netherlands) Tom Okker
12 Feb	Congoleum Classic; Rancho Mirage, California, US; Hard – $250,000 – 64S/32D	(United States) Sandy Mayer (United States) Gene Mayer; 6–4, 7–6	(South Africa) Cliff Drysdale (United States) Bruce Manson	(United States) Eliot Teltscher (United States) Harold Solomon	(United States) Jimmy Connors (Australia) Colin Dibley (Poland) Wojciech Fibak (Netherlands) Tom Okker
12 Feb	Sarasota, Florida, US; Carpet (i) – $50,000 – 32S/16D	(South Africa) Johan Kriek; 7–6, 6–2	(United States) Richard Meyer	(Romania) Ilie Năstase (Spain) Manuel Orantes	(United States) Rick Fisher (United States) Randy Crawford (United States) Ferdi Taygan (Australia) Noel Phillips
12 Feb	Sarasota, Florida, US; Carpet (i) – $50,000 – 32S/16D	(Romania) Ilie Năstase (United States) Steve Krulevitz; 7–6, 6–3	(Australia) John James (United States) Keith Richardson	(Romania) Ilie Năstase (Spain) Manuel Orantes	(United States) Rick Fisher (United States) Randy Crawford (United States) Ferdi Taygan (Australia) Noel Phillips
19 Feb	United Bank Classic; Denver, Colorado, US; Carpet (i) – $125,000 – 32S/16D	(Poland) Wojciech Fibak; 6–4, 6–1	(United States) Victor Amaya	(United States) Arthur Ashe (United States) Dick Stockton	(South Africa) Bernard Mitton (United Kingdom) Buster Mottram (Czechoslovakia) Tomáš Šmíd (Paraguay) Francisco González
19 Feb	United Bank Classic; Denver, Colorado, US; Carpet (i) – $125,000 – 32S/16D	(United States) Stan Smith (United States) Robert Lutz; 7–6, 6–3	(Poland) Wojciech Fibak (Netherlands) Tom Okker	(United States) Arthur Ashe (United States) Dick Stockton	(South Africa) Bernard Mitton (United Kingdom) Buster Mottram (Czechoslovakia) Tomáš Šmíd (Paraguay) Francisco González
26 Feb	Lagos Classic; Lagos, Nigeria; Hard – $50,000 – 32S/16D	(Austria) Hans Kary; 6–4, 3–6, 6–2	(Austria) Peter Feigl	(Czechoslovakia) Jan Kodeš (Egypt) Ismail El Shafei	(United States) Peter Pearson (Nigeria) David Imonitie (France) Patrice Dominguez (West Germany) Karl Meiler
26 Feb	Lagos Classic; Lagos, Nigeria; Hard – $50,000 – 32S/16D	(United States) Bruce Kleege (United States) Joel Bailey; 6–4, 6–7, 6–3	(Egypt) Ismail El Shafei (Austria) Peter Feigl	(Czechoslovakia) Jan Kodeš (Egypt) Ismail El Shafei	(United States) Peter Pearson (Nigeria) David Imonitie (France) Patrice Dominguez (West Germany) Karl Meiler
26 Feb	U.S. National Indoor Championships; Memphis, Tennessee, US; Carpet (i) – $250,000 – 48S/24D	(United States) Jimmy Connors; 6–4, 5–7, 6–3	(United States) Arthur Ashe	(United States) Vitas Gerulaitis (United States) Roscoe Tanner	(United States) Sandy Mayer (United States) Victor Amaya (Australia) John Alexander (United States) Gene Mayer
26 Feb	U.S. National Indoor Championships; Memphis, Tennessee, US; Carpet (i) – $250,000 – 48S/24D	(Netherlands) Tom Okker (Poland) Wojciech Fibak; 6–4, 6–4	(South Africa) Frew McMillan (United States) Dick Stockton	(United States) Vitas Gerulaitis (United States) Roscoe Tanner	(United States) Sandy Mayer (United States) Victor Amaya (Australia) John Alexander (United States) Gene Mayer

=== March ===
Week	Tournament	Champions	Runners-up	Semifinalists	Quarterfinalists
12 Mar	Volvo Tennis Classic; Washington, D.C., US; Carpet (i) – $125,000 – 32S/16D	(United States) Roscoe Tanner; 6–4, 6–4	(United States) Brian Gottfried	(United States) Marty Riessen (United States) Arthur Ashe	(United States) Eddie Dibbs (Rhodesia) Andrew Pattison (United States) Jeff Borowiak (United States) Victor Amaya
12 Mar	Volvo Tennis Classic; Washington, D.C., US; Carpet (i) – $125,000 – 32S/16D	(United States) Stan Smith (United States) Robert Lutz; 6–4, 7–5, 3–6, 7–6	(Australia) Bob Carmichael (United States) Brian Teacher	(United States) Marty Riessen (United States) Arthur Ashe	(United States) Eddie Dibbs (Rhodesia) Andrew Pattison (United States) Jeff Borowiak (United States) Victor Amaya
19 Mar	Lorraine Open; Nancy, France; Hard (i) – $50,000 – 32S/16D	(France) Yannick Noah; 6–2, 5–7, 6–1, 7–5	(France) Jean-Louis Haillet	(France) Patrice Dominguez (Hungary) Balázs Taróczy	(Italy) Corrado Barazzutti (Paraguay) Víctor Pecci (France) Georges Goven (France) Éric Deblicker
19 Mar	Lorraine Open; Nancy, France; Hard (i) – $50,000 – 32S/16D	(West Germany) Karl Meiler (West Germany) Klaus Eberhard; 4–6, 7–6, 6–3	(United Kingdom) Robin Drysdale (United Kingdom) Andrew Jarrett	(France) Patrice Dominguez (Hungary) Balázs Taróczy	(Italy) Corrado Barazzutti (Paraguay) Víctor Pecci (France) Georges Goven (France) Éric Deblicker
19 Mar	New Orleans Tennis Festival; New Orleans (WCT), Louisiana, US; Carpet (i) – $175,000 – 32S/16D	(United States) John McEnroe; 6–4, 6–2	(United States) Roscoe Tanner	(United States) Ferdi Taygan (Sweden) Björn Borg	(United States) Tom Gullikson (South Africa) Raymond Moore (Czechoslovakia) Tomáš Šmíd (United States) Brian Gottfried
19 Mar	New Orleans Tennis Festival; New Orleans (WCT), Louisiana, US; Carpet (i) – $175,000 – 32S/16D	(United States) John McEnroe (United States) Peter Fleming; 6–1, 6–3	(United States) Robert Lutz (United States) Stan Smith	(United States) Ferdi Taygan (Sweden) Björn Borg	(United States) Tom Gullikson (South Africa) Raymond Moore (Czechoslovakia) Tomáš Šmíd (United States) Brian Gottfried
19 Mar	Friendship Tournament; San José, Costa Rica; Hard – $50,000 – 32S/16D	(South Africa) Bernard Mitton; 6–4, 6–1, 6–3	(United States) Tom Gorman	(United States) Butch Walts (United States) George Hardie	(Argentina) Guillermo Vilas (United States) Mike Shore (India) Sashi Menon (United States) Bruce Kleege
19 Mar	Friendship Tournament; San José, Costa Rica; Hard – $50,000 – 32S/16D	(Romania) Ion Țiriac (Argentina) Guillermo Vilas; 6–4, 2–6, 6–4	(India) Anand Amritraj (Australia) Colin Dibley	(United States) Butch Walts (United States) George Hardie	(Argentina) Guillermo Vilas (United States) Mike Shore (India) Sashi Menon (United States) Bruce Kleege
26 Mar	Dayton Pro Tennis Classic; Dayton, Ohio, US; Carpet (i) – $75,000 – 32S/16D	(United States) Butch Walts; 6–3, 6–4	(United States) Marty Riessen	(United States) Tom Gorman (United States) Tim Gullikson	(Australia) Kim Warwick (United States) Eliot Teltscher (United States) Victor Amaya (United States) Sherwood Stewart
26 Mar	Dayton Pro Tennis Classic; Dayton, Ohio, US; Carpet (i) – $75,000 – 32S/16D	(United States) Bruce Manson (South Africa) Cliff Drysdale; 3–6, 6–3, 7–6^{(7–1)}	(Australia) Ross Case (Australia) Phil Dent	(United States) Tom Gorman (United States) Tim Gullikson	(Australia) Kim Warwick (United States) Eliot Teltscher (United States) Victor Amaya (United States) Sherwood Stewart
26 Mar	Ramazzotti Cup (WCT); Milan, Italy; Carpet (i) – $200,000 – 32S/16D; Singles – Doubles	(United States) John McEnroe; 6–4, 6–3	(Australia) John Alexander	(Italy) Adriano Panatta (United States) Vitas Gerulaitis	(Sweden) Björn Borg (United States) Gene Mayer (Rhodesia) Andrew Pattison (Czechoslovakia) Tomáš Šmíd
26 Mar	Ramazzotti Cup (WCT); Milan, Italy; Carpet (i) – $200,000 – 32S/16D; Singles – Doubles	(United States) John McEnroe (United States) Peter Fleming; 6–1, 6–3	(Argentina) José Luis Clerc (Czechoslovakia) Tomáš Šmíd	(Italy) Adriano Panatta (United States) Vitas Gerulaitis	(Sweden) Björn Borg (United States) Gene Mayer (Rhodesia) Andrew Pattison (Czechoslovakia) Tomáš Šmíd
26 Mar	Stuttgart Indoor; Stuttgart, Germany; Hard (i) – $75,000 – 32S/16D	(Poland) Wojciech Fibak; 6–2, 6–2, 3–6, 6–2	(Argentina) Guillermo Vilas	(Switzerland) Heinz Günthardt (India) Vijay Amritraj	(Czechoslovakia) Stanislav Birner (West Germany) Ulrich Pinner (United States) Brian Teacher (Czechoslovakia) Pavel Složil
26 Mar	Stuttgart Indoor; Stuttgart, Germany; Hard (i) – $75,000 – 32S/16D	(Netherlands) Tom Okker (Poland) Wojciech Fibak; 6–3, 5–7, 7–6	(Australia) Bob Carmichael (United States) Brian Teacher	(Switzerland) Heinz Günthardt (India) Vijay Amritraj	(Czechoslovakia) Stanislav Birner (West Germany) Ulrich Pinner (United States) Brian Teacher (Czechoslovakia) Pavel Složil

=== April ===
Week	Tournament	Champions	Runners-up	Semifinalists	Quarterfinalists
2 Apr	Nice International Open; Nice, France; Clay – $50,000 – 32S/16D	(Paraguay) Víctor Pecci; 6–3, 6–2, 7–5	(Australia) John Alexander	(Italy) Corrado Barazzutti (France) Jean-François Caujolle	(France) Patrick Proisy (Czechoslovakia) Tomáš Šmíd (Brazil) Carlos Kirmayr (Hungary) Balázs Taróczy
2 Apr	Nice International Open; Nice, France; Clay – $50,000 – 32S/16D	(Australia) Peter McNamara (Australia) Paul McNamee; 6–1, 3–6, 6–2	(Czechoslovakia) Pavel Složil (Czechoslovakia) Tomáš Šmíd	(Italy) Corrado Barazzutti (France) Jean-François Caujolle	(France) Patrick Proisy (Czechoslovakia) Tomáš Šmíd (Brazil) Carlos Kirmayr (Hungary) Balázs Taróczy
2 Apr	ABN World Tennis Tournament (WCT); Rotterdam, Netherlands; Carpet (i) – $175,000 – 32S/16D; Singles – Doubles	(Sweden) Björn Borg; 6–4, 6–2	(United States) John McEnroe	(United States) Peter Fleming (India) Vijay Amritraj	(South Africa) Johan Kriek (Mexico) Raúl Ramírez (Poland) Wojciech Fibak (United States) Vitas Gerulaitis
2 Apr	ABN World Tennis Tournament (WCT); Rotterdam, Netherlands; Carpet (i) – $175,000 – 32S/16D; Singles – Doubles	(United States) John McEnroe (United States) Peter Fleming; 6–4, 6–4	(Switzerland) Heinz Günthardt (South Africa) Bernard Mitton	(United States) Peter Fleming (India) Vijay Amritraj	(South Africa) Johan Kriek (Mexico) Raúl Ramírez (Poland) Wojciech Fibak (United States) Vitas Gerulaitis
9 Apr	Egyptian Open; Cairo, Egypt; Clay – $75,000 – 32S/16D	(Austria) Peter Feigl; 7–5, 3–6, 6–1	(Brazil) Carlos Kirmayr	(Australia) Peter McNamara (United States) Stan Smith	(France) Georges Goven (Egypt) Ismail El Shafei (France) Patrick Proisy (India) Vijay Amritraj
9 Apr	Egyptian Open; Cairo, Egypt; Clay – $75,000 – 32S/16D	(Australia) Peter McNamara (Australia) Paul McNamee; 7–5, 6–4	(India) Anand Amritraj (India) Vijay Amritraj	(Australia) Peter McNamara (United States) Stan Smith	(France) Georges Goven (Egypt) Ismail El Shafei (France) Patrick Proisy (India) Vijay Amritraj
9 Apr	Monte Carlo Open (WCT); Roquebrune-Cap-Martin, France; Clay – $175,000 – 32S/16D	(Sweden) Björn Borg; 6–2, 6–1, 6–3	(United States) Vitas Gerulaitis	(Paraguay) Víctor Pecci (Australia) John Alexander	(Argentina) José Luis Clerc (France) Yannick Noah (Mexico) Raúl Ramírez (Romania) Ilie Năstase
9 Apr	Monte Carlo Open (WCT); Roquebrune-Cap-Martin, France; Clay – $175,000 – 32S/16D	(Mexico) Raúl Ramírez (Romania) Ilie Năstase; 6–3, 6–4	(Paraguay) Víctor Pecci (Hungary) Balázs Taróczy	(Paraguay) Víctor Pecci (Australia) John Alexander	(Argentina) José Luis Clerc (France) Yannick Noah (Mexico) Raúl Ramírez (Romania) Ilie Năstase
9 Apr	Bank of Oklahoma Classic; Tulsa, Oklahoma, US; Hard – $50,000 – 32S/16D	(United States) Jimmy Connors; 6–7, 7–5, 6–1	(United States) Eddie Dibbs	(United States) Butch Walts (United States) Eliot Teltscher	(United States) Tim Wilkison (United States) Billy Martin (United States) Tom Gorman (Chile) Jaime Fillol
9 Apr	Bank of Oklahoma Classic; Tulsa, Oklahoma, US; Hard – $50,000 – 32S/16D	(United States) Eliot Teltscher (Paraguay) Francisco González; 6–7, 7–5, 6–3	(Australia) Colin Dibley (United States) Tom Gullikson	(United States) Butch Walts (United States) Eliot Teltscher	(United States) Tim Wilkison (United States) Billy Martin (United States) Tom Gorman (Chile) Jaime Fillol
16 Apr	Houston (WCT), Texas, US; Clay – $175,000 – 32S/16D	(Spain) José Higueras; 6–3, 2–6, 7–6	(United States) Gene Mayer	(Spain) Manuel Orantes (United States) Roscoe Tanner	(Ecuador) Ricardo Ycaza (Chile) Hans Gildemeister (United States) Eddie Dibbs (Italy) Corrado Barazzutti
16 Apr	Houston (WCT), Texas, US; Clay – $175,000 – 32S/16D	(United States) Sherwood Stewart (United States) Gene Mayer; 6–1, 5–7, 6–4	(Australia) John Alexander (Australia) Geoff Masters	(Spain) Manuel Orantes (United States) Roscoe Tanner	(Ecuador) Ricardo Ycaza (Chile) Hans Gildemeister (United States) Eddie Dibbs (Italy) Corrado Barazzutti
16 Apr	Johannesburg, South Africa; Hard – $75,000 – 32S/16D	(Argentina) José Luis Clerc; 6–2, 6–1	(South Africa) Deon Joubert	(France) Patrice Dominguez (Australia) Peter McNamara	(Switzerland) Heinz Günthardt (South Africa) David Schneider (Rhodesia) Andrew Pattison (Brazil) Carlos Kirmayr
16 Apr	Johannesburg, South Africa; Hard – $75,000 – 32S/16D	(Switzerland) Heinz Günthardt (Switzerland) Colin Dowdeswell; 6–3, 7–6	(South Africa) Raymond Moore (Romania) Ilie Năstase	(France) Patrice Dominguez (Australia) Peter McNamara	(Switzerland) Heinz Günthardt (South Africa) David Schneider (Rhodesia) Andrew Pattison (Brazil) Carlos Kirmayr
16 Apr	San Jose, California, US; Carpet (i) – $50,000 – 32S/16D	(United States) John McEnroe; 7–6, 7–6	(United States) Peter Fleming	(United States) Butch Walts (United States) Nick Saviano	(United States) Bill Scanlon (United States) Bruce Manson (United States) Hank Pfister (United States) Ferdi Taygan
16 Apr	San Jose, California, US; Carpet (i) – $50,000 – 32S/16D	(United States) John McEnroe (United States) Peter Fleming; 6–3, 6–4	(United States) Hank Pfister (United States) Brad Rowe	(United States) Butch Walts (United States) Nick Saviano	(United States) Bill Scanlon (United States) Bruce Manson (United States) Hank Pfister (United States) Ferdi Taygan
23 Apr	Alan King Tennis Classic; Las Vegas, Nevada, US; Hard – $250,000 – 32S/16D	(Sweden) Björn Borg; 6–3, 6–2	(United States) Jimmy Connors	(United States) Gene Mayer (United States) John McEnroe	(United States) Tim Gullikson (Italy) Adriano Panatta (South Africa) Johan Kriek (United States) Roscoe Tanner
23 Apr	Alan King Tennis Classic; Las Vegas, Nevada, US; Hard – $250,000 – 32S/16D	(United States) Sherwood Stewart (United States) Marty Riessen; 4–6, 6–4, 7–6	(Italy) Adriano Panatta (Mexico) Raúl Ramírez	(United States) Gene Mayer (United States) John McEnroe	(United States) Tim Gullikson (Italy) Adriano Panatta (South Africa) Johan Kriek (United States) Roscoe Tanner
30 Apr	Dallas WCT; Dallas, Texas, US; Carpet (i) – $200,000 – S8	(United States) John McEnroe; 7–5, 4–6, 6–2, 7–6	(Sweden) Björn Borg	(United States) Jimmy Connors (United States) Vitas Gerulaitis	(United States) Gene Mayer (Australia) John Alexander (United States) Brian Gottfried (Australia) Geoff Masters

=== May ===
Week	Tournament	Champions	Runners-up	Semifinalists	Quarterfinalists
7 May	Nations Cup; Düsseldorf, Germany; Clay – $250,000 – S16/D8	Australia; 2–1	Italy	Round robin (Section A); Argentina; Spain; Great Britain	Round robin (Section B); United States; West Germany; Mexico
14 May	Alitalia Florence Open; Florence, Italy; Clay – $50,000 – 32S/16D	(Mexico) Raúl Ramírez; 6–4, 1–6, 3–6, 7–5, 6–0	(West Germany) Karl Meiler	(France) Jean-François Caujolle (France) Pascal Portes	(United States) Arthur Ashe (Czechoslovakia) Pavel Složil (United Kingdom) Buster Mottram (France) Yannick Noah
14 May	Alitalia Florence Open; Florence, Italy; Clay – $50,000 – 32S/16D	(Italy) Adriano Panatta (Italy) Paolo Bertolucci; 6–4, 6–3	(Czechoslovakia) Ivan Lendl (Czechoslovakia) Pavel Složil	(France) Jean-François Caujolle (France) Pascal Portes	(United States) Arthur Ashe (Czechoslovakia) Pavel Složil (United Kingdom) Buster Mottram (France) Yannick Noah
14 May	German Open; Hamburg, Germany; Clay – $175,000 – 64S/32D	(Spain) José Higueras; 3–6, 6–1, 6–4, 6–1	(United States) Harold Solomon	(United States) Eliot Teltscher (West Germany) Ulrich Pinner	(Argentina) José Luis Clerc (United States) Eddie Dibbs (Czechoslovakia) Tomáš Šmíd (Poland) Wojciech Fibak
14 May	German Open; Hamburg, Germany; Clay – $175,000 – 64S/32D	(Czechoslovakia) Tomáš Šmíd (Czechoslovakia) Jan Kodeš; 6–3, 6–1, 7–6	(Australia) Mark Edmondson (Australia) John Marks	(United States) Eliot Teltscher (West Germany) Ulrich Pinner	(Argentina) José Luis Clerc (United States) Eddie Dibbs (Czechoslovakia) Tomáš Šmíd (Poland) Wojciech Fibak
21 May	Italian Open; Rome, Italy; Clay – $200,000 – 64S/32D	(United States) Vitas Gerulaitis; 6–7, 7–6, 6–7, 6–4, 6–2	(Argentina) Guillermo Vilas	(United States) Gene Mayer (United States) Eddie Dibbs	(Italy) Adriano Panatta (United States) Terry Moor (United States) Harold Solomon (Italy) Gianni Ocleppo
21 May	Italian Open; Rome, Italy; Clay – $200,000 – 64S/32D	(Czechoslovakia) Tomáš Šmíd (United States) Peter Fleming; 4–6, 6–1, 7–5	(Argentina) José Luis Clerc (Romania) Ilie Năstase	(United States) Gene Mayer (United States) Eddie Dibbs	(Italy) Adriano Panatta (United States) Terry Moor (United States) Harold Solomon (Italy) Gianni Ocleppo
21 May	BMW Open; Munich, Germany; Clay – $75,000 – 32S/16D; Singles – Doubles	(Spain) Manuel Orantes; 6–3, 6–2, 6–4	(Poland) Wojciech Fibak	(Czechoslovakia) Jiří Hřebec (Ecuador) Andrés Gómez	(West Germany) Werner Zirngibl (Colombia) Iván Molina (Czechoslovakia) Jan Kodeš (West Germany) Peter Elter
21 May	BMW Open; Munich, Germany; Clay – $75,000 – 32S/16D; Singles – Doubles	(Netherlands) Tom Okker (Poland) Wojciech Fibak; 7–6, 7–5	(West Germany) Jürgen Fassbender (France) Jean-Louis Haillet	(Czechoslovakia) Jiří Hřebec (Ecuador) Andrés Gómez	(West Germany) Werner Zirngibl (Colombia) Iván Molina (Czechoslovakia) Jan Kodeš (West Germany) Peter Elter
28 May; 4 Jun	French Open; Paris, France; Grand Slam; Clay – $375,000 – 128S/64D/24XD; Singles – Doubles – Mixed doubles	(Sweden) Björn Borg; 6–3, 6–1, 6–7^{(6–8)}, 6–4	(Paraguay) Víctor Pecci	(United States) Vitas Gerulaitis (United States) Jimmy Connors	(Chile) Hans Gildemeister (Spain) José Higueras (Argentina) Guillermo Vilas (United States) Eddie Dibbs
28 May; 4 Jun	French Open; Paris, France; Grand Slam; Clay – $375,000 – 128S/64D/24XD; Singles – Doubles – Mixed doubles	(United States) Gene Mayer (United States) Sandy Mayer; 6–4, 6–4, 6–4	(Australia) Ross Case (United States) Phil Dent	(United States) Vitas Gerulaitis (United States) Jimmy Connors	(Chile) Hans Gildemeister (Spain) José Higueras (Argentina) Guillermo Vilas (United States) Eddie Dibbs
28 May; 4 Jun	French Open; Paris, France; Grand Slam; Clay – $375,000 – 128S/64D/24XD; Singles – Doubles – Mixed doubles	(Australia) Wendy Turnbull (South Africa) Bob Hewitt; 6–3, 2–6, 6–3	(Romania) Virginia Ruzici (Romania) Ion Țiriac	(United States) Vitas Gerulaitis (United States) Jimmy Connors	(Chile) Hans Gildemeister (Spain) José Higueras (Argentina) Guillermo Vilas (United States) Eddie Dibbs

=== June ===
Week	Tournament	Champions	Runners-up	Semifinalists	Quarterfinalists
11 Jun	Belgian International Championships; Brussels, Belgium; Clay – $50,000 – 32S/16D	(Hungary) Balázs Taróczy; 6–1, 1–6, 6–3	(Czechoslovakia) Ivan Lendl	(Czechoslovakia) Tomáš Šmíd (Belgium) Bernard Boileau	(West Germany) Werner Zirngibl (West Germany) Ulrich Pinner (Sweden) Stefan Simonsson (West Germany) Andreas Maurer
11 Jun	Belgian International Championships; Brussels, Belgium; Clay – $50,000 – 32S/16D	(United States) Billy Martin (Australia) Peter McNamara; 5–7, 7–5, 6–4	(Brazil) Carlos Kirmayr (Hungary) Balázs Taróczy	(Czechoslovakia) Tomáš Šmíd (Belgium) Bernard Boileau	(West Germany) Werner Zirngibl (West Germany) Ulrich Pinner (Sweden) Stefan Simonsson (West Germany) Andreas Maurer
11 Jun	Queen's Club Championships; London, United Kingdom; Grass – $125,000 – 64S/32D; Singles – Doubles	(United States) John McEnroe; 6–7, 6–1, 6–1	(Paraguay) Víctor Pecci	(United States) Arthur Ashe (United States) Roscoe Tanner	(United States) Robert Lutz (United States) Dick Stockton (United States) Nick Saviano (United States) Sandy Mayer
11 Jun	Queen's Club Championships; London, United Kingdom; Grass – $125,000 – 64S/32D; Singles – Doubles	(United States) Tom Gullikson (United States) Tim Gullikson; 6–4, 6–4	(United States) Marty Riessen (United States) Sherwood Stewart	(United States) Arthur Ashe (United States) Roscoe Tanner	(United States) Robert Lutz (United States) Dick Stockton (United States) Nick Saviano (United States) Sandy Mayer
18 Jun	Berlin Open; Berlin, West Germany; Clay – $50,000 – 32S/16D	(Australia) Peter McNamara; 6–4, 6–0, 6–7, 6–2	(France) Patrice Dominguez	(Spain) Fernando Luna (Czechoslovakia) Tomáš Šmíd	(Hungary) Balázs Taróczy (Brazil) Carlos Kirmayr (West Germany) Klaus Eberhard (Czechoslovakia) Ivan Lendl
18 Jun	Berlin Open; Berlin, West Germany; Clay – $50,000 – 32S/16D	(Czechoslovakia) Ivan Lendl (Brazil) Carlos Kirmayr; 6–2, 6–1	(Venezuela) Jorge Andrew (Czechoslovakia) Stanislav Birner	(Spain) Fernando Luna (Czechoslovakia) Tomáš Šmíd	(Hungary) Balázs Taróczy (Brazil) Carlos Kirmayr (West Germany) Klaus Eberhard (Czechoslovakia) Ivan Lendl
18 Jun	Surbiton, United Kingdom; Grass – $50,000 – 32S/16D	(United States) Victor Amaya; 6–4, 7–5	(Australia) Mark Edmondson	(United States) Brian Gottfried (Australia) Colin Dibley	(United States) Tim Wilkison (United States) Hank Pfister (United States) Pat DuPré (South Africa) Bernard Mitton
18 Jun	Surbiton, United Kingdom; Grass – $50,000 – 32S/16D	(United States) Tom Gullikson (United States) Tim Gullikson; 6–3, 6–7, 8–6	(United States) Pat DuPré (United States) Marty Riessen	(United States) Brian Gottfried (Australia) Colin Dibley	(United States) Tim Wilkison (United States) Hank Pfister (United States) Pat DuPré (South Africa) Bernard Mitton
25 Jun; 2 Jul	Wimbledon; London, United Kingdom; Grand Slam; Grass – $300,000 – 128S/64D/48XD; Singles – Doubles – Mixed doubles	(Sweden) Björn Borg; 6–7^{(4–7)}, 6–1, 3–6, 6–3, 6–4	(United States) Roscoe Tanner	(United States) Jimmy Connors (United States) Pat DuPré	(Netherlands) Tom Okker (United States) Bill Scanlon (Italy) Adriano Panatta (United States) Tim Gullikson
25 Jun; 2 Jul	Wimbledon; London, United Kingdom; Grand Slam; Grass – $300,000 – 128S/64D/48XD; Singles – Doubles – Mixed doubles	(United States) John McEnroe (United States) Peter Fleming; 4–6, 6–4, 6–2, 6–2	(United States) Brian Gottfried (Mexico) Raúl Ramírez	(United States) Jimmy Connors (United States) Pat DuPré	(Netherlands) Tom Okker (United States) Bill Scanlon (Italy) Adriano Panatta (United States) Tim Gullikson
25 Jun; 2 Jul	Wimbledon; London, United Kingdom; Grand Slam; Grass – $300,000 – 128S/64D/48XD; Singles – Doubles – Mixed doubles	(South Africa) Greer Stevens (South Africa) Bob Hewitt; 7–5, 7–6^{(9–7)}	(Netherlands) Betty Stöve (South Africa) Frew McMillan	(United States) Jimmy Connors (United States) Pat DuPré	(Netherlands) Tom Okker (United States) Bill Scanlon (Italy) Adriano Panatta (United States) Tim Gullikson

=== July ===
Week	Tournament	Champions	Runners-up	Semifinalists	Quarterfinalists
9 Jul	Swiss Championships; Gstaad, Switzerland; Clay – $75,000 – 32S/16D	(West Germany) Ulrich Pinner; 6–2, 6–4, 7–5	(Australia) Peter McNamara	(Egypt) Ismail El Shafei (Argentina) José Luis Clerc	(France) Pascal Portes (Switzerland) Heinz Günthardt (Netherlands) Tom Okker (France) Patrick Proisy
9 Jul	Swiss Championships; Gstaad, Switzerland; Clay – $75,000 – 32S/16D	(Australia) John Marks (Australia) Mark Edmondson; 2–6, 6–1, 6–4	(Romania) Ion Țiriac (Argentina) Guillermo Vilas	(Egypt) Ismail El Shafei (Argentina) José Luis Clerc	(France) Pascal Portes (Switzerland) Heinz Günthardt (Netherlands) Tom Okker (France) Patrick Proisy
9 Jul	Newport, Rhode Island, US; Grass – $100,000 – 32S/16D	(United States) Brian Teacher; 1–6, 6–3, 6–4	(United States) Stan Smith	(United States) Hank Pfister (United States) Tim Wilkison	(United States) Tim Gullikson (Australia) Geoff Masters (United States) Robert Lutz (Australia) Chris Kachel
9 Jul	Newport, Rhode Island, US; Grass – $100,000 – 32S/16D	(United States) Stan Smith (United States) Robert Lutz; 6–4, 7–6	(Australia) John James (Australia) Chris Kachel	(United States) Hank Pfister (United States) Tim Wilkison	(United States) Tim Gullikson (Australia) Geoff Masters (United States) Robert Lutz (Australia) Chris Kachel
16 Jul	Washington Star International; Washington, D.C., US; Clay – $175,000 – 64S/32D	(Argentina) Guillermo Vilas; 7–6, 7–6	(Paraguay) Víctor Pecci	(Argentina) José Luis Clerc (United States) Eddie Dibbs	(Australia) Geoff Masters (Chile) Hans Gildemeister (Spain) José Higueras (United States) Eliot Teltscher
16 Jul	Washington Star International; Washington, D.C., US; Clay – $175,000 – 64S/32D	(United States) Sherwood Stewart (United States) Marty Riessen; 2–6, 6–3, 6–4	(United States) Brian Gottfried (Mexico) Raúl Ramírez	(Argentina) José Luis Clerc (United States) Eddie Dibbs	(Australia) Geoff Masters (Chile) Hans Gildemeister (Spain) José Higueras (United States) Eliot Teltscher
16 Jul	Swedish Open; Båstad, Sweden; Clay – $75,000 – 32S/16D	(Sweden) Björn Borg; 6–1, 7–5	(Hungary) Balázs Taróczy	(Sweden) Kjell Johansson (France) Patrick Proisy	(United States) Billy Martin (Switzerland) Heinz Günthardt (Australia) Mark Edmondson (Sweden) Per Hjertquist
16 Jul	Swedish Open; Båstad, Sweden; Clay – $75,000 – 32S/16D	(South Africa) Bob Hewitt (Switzerland) Heinz Günthardt; 6–2, 6–2	(Australia) Mark Edmondson (Australia) John Marks	(Sweden) Kjell Johansson (France) Patrick Proisy	(United States) Billy Martin (Switzerland) Heinz Günthardt (Australia) Mark Edmondson (Sweden) Per Hjertquist
16 Jul	Mercedes Cup; Stuttgart, Germany; Clay – $75,000 – 32S/16D	(Czechoslovakia) Tomáš Šmíd; 6–4, 6–0, 6–2	(West Germany) Ulrich Pinner	(West Germany) Rolf Gehring (Switzerland) Colin Dowdeswell	(Poland) Wojciech Fibak (Socialist Federal Republic of Yugoslavia) Željko Franulović (Australia) Peter McNamara (Czechoslovakia) Pavel Huťka
16 Jul	Mercedes Cup; Stuttgart, Germany; Clay – $75,000 – 32S/16D	(South Africa) Frew McMillan (Switzerland) Colin Dowdeswell; 6–4, 6–2, 2–6, 6–4	(Poland) Wojciech Fibak (Czechoslovakia) Pavel Složil	(West Germany) Rolf Gehring (Switzerland) Colin Dowdeswell	(Poland) Wojciech Fibak (Socialist Federal Republic of Yugoslavia) Željko Franulović (Australia) Peter McNamara (Czechoslovakia) Pavel Huťka
23 Jul	Dutch Open; Hilversum, Netherlands; Clay – $75,000 – 32S/16D	(Hungary) Balázs Taróczy; 6–2, 6–2, 6–1	(Czechoslovakia) Tomáš Šmíd	(West Germany) Ulrich Pinner (Czechoslovakia) Jan Kodeš	(France) Jean-Louis Haillet (United Kingdom) Buster Mottram (Australia) Peter McNamara (Netherlands) Louk Sanders
23 Jul	Dutch Open; Hilversum, Netherlands; Clay – $75,000 – 32S/16D	(Hungary) Balázs Taróczy (Netherlands) Tom Okker; 6–1, 6–3	(Czechoslovakia) Jan Kodeš (Czechoslovakia) Tomáš Šmíd	(West Germany) Ulrich Pinner (Czechoslovakia) Jan Kodeš	(France) Jean-Louis Haillet (United Kingdom) Buster Mottram (Australia) Peter McNamara (Netherlands) Louk Sanders
23 Jul	Kitzbühel, Austria; Clay – $75,000 – S32/D64	(United States) Vitas Gerulaitis; 6–2, 6–2, 6–4	(Czechoslovakia) Pavel Složil	(Switzerland) Heinz Günthardt (France) Christophe Freyss	(Socialist Federal Republic of Yugoslavia) Željko Franulović (Poland) Wojciech Fibak (New Zealand) Chris Lewis (Spain) Antonio Muñoz
23 Jul	Kitzbühel, Austria; Clay – $75,000 – S32/D64	(Switzerland) Heinz Günthardt (Socialist Federal Republic of Yugoslavia) Željko Franulović; 6–2, 6–4	(Australia) Dick Crealy (Italy) Antonio Zugarelli	(Switzerland) Heinz Günthardt (France) Christophe Freyss	(Socialist Federal Republic of Yugoslavia) Željko Franulović (Poland) Wojciech Fibak (New Zealand) Chris Lewis (Spain) Antonio Muñoz
23 Jul	Louisville International Classic; Louisville, Kentucky, US; Clay – $175,000 – 64S/32D	(Australia) John Alexander; 7–6, 6–7, 3–3, ret.	(United States) Terry Moor	(United States) Eliot Teltscher (Argentina) José Luis Clerc	(United States) Harold Solomon (South Africa) Deon Joubert (Australia) Ross Case (United States) Eddie Dibbs
23 Jul	Louisville International Classic; Louisville, Kentucky, US; Clay – $175,000 – 64S/32D	(United States) Sherwood Stewart (United States) Marty Riessen; 6–2, 1–6, 6–1	(India) Vijay Amritraj (Mexico) Raúl Ramírez	(United States) Eliot Teltscher (Argentina) José Luis Clerc	(United States) Harold Solomon (South Africa) Deon Joubert (Australia) Ross Case (United States) Eddie Dibbs
30 Jul	Volvo International; North Conway, New Hampshire, US; Clay – $175,000 – 64S/32D; Singles – Doubles	(United States) Harold Solomon; 5–7, 6–4, 7–6	(Spain) José Higueras	(United States) Eddie Dibbs (Argentina) Guillermo Vilas	(Hungary) Balázs Taróczy (Argentina) José Luis Clerc (Paraguay) Víctor Pecci (Italy) Corrado Barazzutti
30 Jul	Volvo International; North Conway, New Hampshire, US; Clay – $175,000 – 64S/32D; Singles – Doubles	(Argentina) Guillermo Vilas (Romania) Ion Țiriac; 6–4, 7–6	(United States) John Sadri (United States) Tim Wilkison	(United States) Eddie Dibbs (Argentina) Guillermo Vilas	(Hungary) Balázs Taróczy (Argentina) José Luis Clerc (Paraguay) Víctor Pecci (Italy) Corrado Barazzutti
30 Jul	Mutual Benefit Life Open; South Orange, New Jersey, US; Clay – $75,000 – 32S/16D	(United States) John McEnroe; 6–7^{(1–7)}, 6–4, 6–0	(United Kingdom) John Lloyd	(United States) Jay Lapidus (United States) Vitas Gerulaitis	(Australia) Chris Kachel (United States) Fred McNair (India) Anand Amritraj (Mexico) Emilio Montaño
30 Jul	Mutual Benefit Life Open; South Orange, New Jersey, US; Clay – $75,000 – 32S/16D	(United States) John McEnroe (United States) Peter Fleming; 6–1, 6–3	(United States) Fritz Buehning (United States) Bruce Nichols	(United States) Jay Lapidus (United States) Vitas Gerulaitis	(Australia) Chris Kachel (United States) Fred McNair (India) Anand Amritraj (Mexico) Emilio Montaño
30 Jul	Acadania Tennis Classic; Lafayette, Louisiana, US; Carpet (i) – $75,000 – 32S/16D	(United States) Marty Riessen; 6–4, 5–7, 6–2	(United States) Pat DuPré	(Australia) Brad Drewett (United States) Vincent Van Patten	(South Africa) Kevin Curren (United States) Victor Amaya (United States) Rick Fisher (United States) Tom Gorman
30 Jul	Acadania Tennis Classic; Lafayette, Louisiana, US; Carpet (i) – $75,000 – 32S/16D	(United States) Marty Riessen (United States) Sherwood Stewart; 6–4, 6–4	(United States) Victor Amaya (United States) Eric Friedler	(Australia) Brad Drewett (United States) Vincent Van Patten	(South Africa) Kevin Curren (United States) Victor Amaya (United States) Rick Fisher (United States) Tom Gorman

=== August ===
Week	Tournament	Champions	Runners-up	Semifinalists	Quarterfinalists
6 Aug	National Revenue Tennis Classic; Columbus, Ohio, US; Clay – $75,000 – 32S/16D	(United States) Brian Gottfried; 6–3, 6–0	(United States) Eddie Dibbs	(South Africa) Bernard Mitton (Romania) Ilie Năstase	(United States) Terry Moor (Paraguay) Francisco González (United States) Tom Gullikson (India) Vijay Amritraj
6 Aug	National Revenue Tennis Classic; Columbus, Ohio, US; Clay – $75,000 – 32S/16D	(United States) Brian Gottfried (United States) Robert Lutz; 4–6, 6–3, 7–6	(United States) Tim Gullikson (United States) Tom Gullikson	(South Africa) Bernard Mitton (Romania) Ilie Năstase	(United States) Terry Moor (Paraguay) Francisco González (United States) Tom Gullikson (India) Vijay Amritraj
6 Aug	U.S. Men's Clay Court Championships; Indianapolis, Indiana, US; Clay – $175,000 – 64S/32D; Singles – Doubles	(United States) Jimmy Connors; 6–1, 2–6, 6–4	(Argentina) Guillermo Vilas	(Spain) José Higueras (United States) John McEnroe	(Czechoslovakia) Ivan Lendl (Italy) Corrado Barazzutti (Argentina) José Luis Clerc (Spain) Manuel Orantes
6 Aug	U.S. Men's Clay Court Championships; Indianapolis, Indiana, US; Clay – $175,000 – 64S/32D; Singles – Doubles	(United States) John McEnroe (United States) Gene Mayer; 6–4, 7–6	(Czechoslovakia) Jan Kodeš (Czechoslovakia) Tomáš Šmíd	(Spain) José Higueras (United States) John McEnroe	(Czechoslovakia) Ivan Lendl (Italy) Corrado Barazzutti (Argentina) José Luis Clerc (Spain) Manuel Orantes
13 Aug	Gray International Open; Cleveland, Ohio, US; Hard – $50,000 – 32S/16D	(United States) Stan Smith; 7–6, 7–5	(Romania) Ilie Năstase	(United States) Gene Malin (United States) Robert Lutz	(India) Ramesh Krishnan (South Africa) John Yuill (Australia) Chris Kachel (Paraguay) Francisco González
13 Aug	Gray International Open; Cleveland, Ohio, US; Hard – $50,000 – 32S/16D	(United States) Stan Smith (United States) Robert Lutz; 6–3, 6–4	(Paraguay) Francisco González (United States) Fred McNair	(United States) Gene Malin (United States) Robert Lutz	(India) Ramesh Krishnan (South Africa) John Yuill (Australia) Chris Kachel (Paraguay) Francisco González
13 Aug	Canadian Open; Toronto, Ontario, Canada; Hard – $175,000 – 64S/32D	(Sweden) Björn Borg; 6–3, 6–3	(United States) John McEnroe	(Czechoslovakia) Ivan Lendl (United States) Vitas Gerulaitis	(United States) Gene Mayer (Australia) Phil Dent (Australia) Paul Kronk (Poland) Wojciech Fibak
13 Aug	Canadian Open; Toronto, Ontario, Canada; Hard – $175,000 – 64S/32D	(United States) John McEnroe (United States) Peter Fleming; 6–7, 7–6, 6–1	(Switzerland) Heinz Günthardt (South Africa) Bob Hewitt	(Czechoslovakia) Ivan Lendl (United States) Vitas Gerulaitis	(United States) Gene Mayer (Australia) Phil Dent (Australia) Paul Kronk (Poland) Wojciech Fibak
13 Aug	English Leather Grand Prix; Stowe, Vermont, US; Hard – $75,000 – 32S/16D	(United States) Jimmy Connors; 6–0, 6–1	(United States) Mike Cahill	(South Africa) Johan Kriek (United States) Tim Gullikson	(India) Anand Amritraj (United States) Fritz Buehning (United States) Tom Gullikson (United States) Bill Maze
13 Aug	English Leather Grand Prix; Stowe, Vermont, US; Hard – $75,000 – 32S/16D	(United States) Mike Cahill (United States) Steve Krulevitz; 3–6, 6–3, 6–4	(India) Anand Amritraj (Australia) Colin Dibley	(South Africa) Johan Kriek (United States) Tim Gullikson	(India) Anand Amritraj (United States) Fritz Buehning (United States) Tom Gullikson (United States) Bill Maze
20 Aug	U.S. Pro Tennis Championships; Boston, Massachusetts, US; Clay – $175,000 – 64S/32D	(Spain) José Higueras; 6–3, 6–1	(Chile) Hans Gildemeister	(Czechoslovakia) Tomáš Šmíd (Spain) Manuel Orantes	(India) Vijay Amritraj (Czechoslovakia) Pavel Složil (South Africa) Johan Kriek (Czechoslovakia) Ivan Lendl
20 Aug	U.S. Pro Tennis Championships; Boston, Massachusetts, US; Clay – $175,000 – 64S/32D	(Australia) Kim Warwick / (Australia) Syd Ball vs (Switzerland) Heinz Günthardt / (Czechoslovakia) Pavel Složil; Not Played		(Czechoslovakia) Tomáš Šmíd (Spain) Manuel Orantes	(India) Vijay Amritraj (Czechoslovakia) Pavel Složil (South Africa) Johan Kriek (Czechoslovakia) Ivan Lendl
20 Aug	ATP Championship; Mason, Ohio, US; Hard – $200,000 – 64S/32D	(United States) Peter Fleming; 6–4, 6–2	(United States) Roscoe Tanner	(South Africa) Bernard Mitton (United States) Pat DuPré	(Romania) Ilie Năstase (United States) Tom Gorman (United States) Stan Smith (United States) Harold Solomon
20 Aug	ATP Championship; Mason, Ohio, US; Hard – $200,000 – 64S/32D	(United States) Brian Gottfried (Romania) Ilie Năstase; 1–6, 6–3, 7–6	(United States) Robert Lutz (United States) Stan Smith	(South Africa) Bernard Mitton (United States) Pat DuPré	(Romania) Ilie Năstase (United States) Tom Gorman (United States) Stan Smith (United States) Harold Solomon
27 Aug; 3 Sep	US Open; Flushing Meadow, New York, US; Grand Slam; Hard – $300,000 – 128S/64D/32XD; Singles – Doubles – Mixed doubles	(United States) John McEnroe; 7–5, 6–3, 6–3	(United States) Vitas Gerulaitis	(United States) Roscoe Tanner (United States) Jimmy Connors	(Sweden) Björn Borg (South Africa) Johan Kriek (United States) Eddie Dibbs (United States) Pat DuPré
27 Aug; 3 Sep	US Open; Flushing Meadow, New York, US; Grand Slam; Hard – $300,000 – 128S/64D/32XD; Singles – Doubles – Mixed doubles	(United States) John McEnroe (United States) Peter Fleming; 6–2, 6–4	(United States) Robert Lutz (United States) Stan Smith	(United States) Roscoe Tanner (United States) Jimmy Connors	(Sweden) Björn Borg (South Africa) Johan Kriek (United States) Eddie Dibbs (United States) Pat DuPré
27 Aug; 3 Sep	US Open; Flushing Meadow, New York, US; Grand Slam; Hard – $300,000 – 128S/64D/32XD; Singles – Doubles – Mixed doubles	(South Africa) Greer Stevens (South Africa) Bob Hewitt; 6–3, 7–5	(Netherlands) Betty Stöve (South Africa) Frew McMillan	(United States) Roscoe Tanner (United States) Jimmy Connors	(Sweden) Björn Borg (South Africa) Johan Kriek (United States) Eddie Dibbs (United States) Pat DuPré

=== September ===
Week	Tournament	Champions	Runners-up	Semifinalists	Quarterfinalists
10 Sep	Atlanta, Georgia, US; Hard – $50,000 – 32S/16D	(United States) Eliot Teltscher; 6–3, 4–6, 6–2	(Australia) John Alexander	(United States) Terry Moor (United States) Eric Friedler	(Australia) Terry Rocavert (New Zealand) Russell Simpson (South Africa) Kevin Curren (South Africa) David Schneider
10 Sep	Atlanta, Georgia, US; Hard – $50,000 – 32S/16D	(Romania) Ilie Năstase (South Africa) Raymond Moore; 6–4, 6–2	(Australia) Steve Docherty (United States) Eliot Teltscher	(United States) Terry Moor (United States) Eric Friedler	(Australia) Terry Rocavert (New Zealand) Russell Simpson (South Africa) Kevin Curren (South Africa) David Schneider
10 Sep	Woodlands Doubles; Woodlands, Texas, US; Hard – $150,000 – S32/D32	(United States) Sherwood Stewart (United States) Marty Riessen; 6–3, 2–2 ret.	(Australia) Bob Carmichael (United States) Tim Gullikson	(United States) S Mayer / (United States) G Mayer (Australia) Marks / (Australia) Edmondson	(Poland) Fibak / (Netherlands) Okker (Australia) Case / (Australia) Dent (United States) Amaya / (United States) Pfister (South Africa) McMillan / (South Africa) Hewitt
17 Sep	Jack Kramer Open; Los Angeles, US; Carpet (i) – $175,000 – 64S/32D	(United States) Peter Fleming; 6–4, 6–4	(United States) John McEnroe	(United States) Eliot Teltscher (United States) Victor Amaya	(United States) Gene Mayer (United States) Hank Pfister (United States) Vince Van Patten (United States) Roscoe Tanner
17 Sep	Jack Kramer Open; Los Angeles, US; Carpet (i) – $175,000 – 64S/32D	(United States) Sherwood Stewart (United States) Marty Riessen; 6–4, 6–4	(Poland) Wojciech Fibak (South Africa) Frew McMillan	(United States) Eliot Teltscher (United States) Victor Amaya	(United States) Gene Mayer (United States) Hank Pfister (United States) Vince Van Patten (United States) Roscoe Tanner
17 Sep	Campionati Internazionali di Sicilia; Palermo, Sicily, Italy; Clay – $75,000 – 32S/16D	(Sweden) Björn Borg; 6–4, 6–0, 6–4	(Italy) Corrado Barazzutti	(United Kingdom) Buster Mottram (Italy) Adriano Panatta	(Sweden) Per Hjertquist (Netherlands) Louk Sanders (Brazil) Carlos Kirmayr (Australia) Peter McNamara
17 Sep	Campionati Internazionali di Sicilia; Palermo, Sicily, Italy; Clay – $75,000 – 32S/16D	(Australia) Peter McNamara (Australia) Paul McNamee; 7–5, 7–6	(Egypt) Ismail El Shafei (United Kingdom) John Feaver	(United Kingdom) Buster Mottram (Italy) Adriano Panatta	(Sweden) Per Hjertquist (Netherlands) Louk Sanders (Brazil) Carlos Kirmayr (Australia) Peter McNamara
24 Sep	Madrid Grand Prix; Madrid, Spain; Clay – $75,000 – 64S/32D	(France) Yannick Noah; 6–3, 6–7, 6–3, 6–2	(Spain) Manuel Orantes	(Spain) José Higueras (Argentina) José Luis Clerc	(United States) Keith Richardson (Spain) Gabriel Urpí (Australia) Peter McNamara (Australia) Paul McNamee
24 Sep	Madrid Grand Prix; Madrid, Spain; Clay – $75,000 – 64S/32D	(Brazil) Cássio Motta (Brazil) Carlos Kirmayr; 7–6, 6–4	(United Kingdom) Robin Drysdale (United Kingdom) John Feaver	(Spain) José Higueras (Argentina) José Luis Clerc	(United States) Keith Richardson (Spain) Gabriel Urpí (Australia) Peter McNamara (Australia) Paul McNamee
24 Sep	Transamerica Open; San Francisco, California, US; Carpet (i) – $175,000 – 64S/32D	(United States) John McEnroe; 4–6, 7–5, 6–2	(United States) Peter Fleming	(United States) Tim Gullikson (United States) Pat DuPré	(United States) Butch Walts (United States) Hank Pfister (South Africa) Raymond Moore (United States) Billy Martin
24 Sep	Transamerica Open; San Francisco, California, US; Carpet (i) – $175,000 – 64S/32D	(United States) John McEnroe (United States) Peter Fleming; 6–1, 6–4	(Poland) Wojciech Fibak (South Africa) Frew McMillan	(United States) Tim Gullikson (United States) Pat DuPré	(United States) Butch Walts (United States) Hank Pfister (South Africa) Raymond Moore (United States) Billy Martin

=== October ===
Week	Tournament	Champions	Runners-up	Semifinalists	Quarterfinalists
1 Oct	Bordeaux Open; Bordeaux, France; Clay – $50,000 – 32S/16D	(France) Yannick Noah; 6–0, 6–7, 6–1, 1–6, 6–4	(United States) Harold Solomon	(Brazil) Carlos Kirmayr (Spain) Angél Giménez	(France) Éric Deblicker (United States) Eliot Teltscher (United States) Terry Moor (France) Patrick Proisy
1 Oct	Bordeaux Open; Bordeaux, France; Clay – $50,000 – 32S/16D	(France) Patrice Dominguez (France) Denis Naegelen; 6–4, 6–4	(France) Bernard Fritz (Colombia) Iván Molina	(Brazil) Carlos Kirmayr (Spain) Angél Giménez	(France) Éric Deblicker (United States) Eliot Teltscher (United States) Terry Moor (France) Patrick Proisy
1 Oct	Island Holidays Classic; Maui, Hawaii, US; Hard – $100,000 – 48S/24D	(United States) Bill Scanlon; 6–1, 6–1	(United States) Peter Fleming	(United States) Victor Amaya (United States) Tom Gorman	(United States) Vince Van Patten (United States) Trey Waltke (United States) Bruce Manson (Australia) Rod Frawley
1 Oct	Island Holidays Classic; Maui, Hawaii, US; Hard – $100,000 – 48S/24D	(United States) Nick Saviano (United Kingdom) John Lloyd; 7–5, 6–4	(Australia) Rod Frawley (Paraguay) Francisco González	(United States) Victor Amaya (United States) Tom Gorman	(United States) Vince Van Patten (United States) Trey Waltke (United States) Bruce Manson (Australia) Rod Frawley
8 Oct	Torneo Godó; Barcelona, Spain; Clay – $175,000 – 64S/32D	(Chile) Hans Gildemeister; 6–4, 6–3, 6–1	(United States) Eddie Dibbs	(Mexico) Raúl Ramírez (United States) Harold Solomon	(Spain) Manuel Orantes (Italy) Adriano Panatta (Czechoslovakia) Tomáš Šmíd (Brazil) Carlos Kirmayr
8 Oct	Torneo Godó; Barcelona, Spain; Clay – $175,000 – 64S/32D	(Italy) Adriano Panatta (Italy) Paolo Bertolucci; 6–4, 6–3	(Brazil) Carlos Kirmayr (Brazil) Cássio Motta	(Mexico) Raúl Ramírez (United States) Harold Solomon	(Spain) Manuel Orantes (Italy) Adriano Panatta (Czechoslovakia) Tomáš Šmíd (Brazil) Carlos Kirmayr
8 Oct	Tel Aviv Open; Tel Aviv, Israel; Hard – $50,000 – 32S/16D; Singles – Doubles	(Netherlands) Tom Okker; 6–4, 6–3	(Sweden) Per Hjertquist	(Australia) Colin Dibley (Sweden) Stefan Simonsson	(United Kingdom) Richard Lewis (West Germany) Andreas Maurer (South Africa) David Schneider (Israel) Shlomo Glickstein
8 Oct	Tel Aviv Open; Tel Aviv, Israel; Hard – $50,000 – 32S/16D; Singles – Doubles	(Netherlands) Tom Okker (Romania) Ilie Năstase; 7–5, 6–4	(United States) Mike Cahill (Australia) Colin Dibley	(Australia) Colin Dibley (Sweden) Stefan Simonsson	(United Kingdom) Richard Lewis (West Germany) Andreas Maurer (South Africa) David Schneider (Israel) Shlomo Glickstein
8 Oct	South Pacific Classic; Brisbane, Australia; Grass – $50,000 – 32S/16D	(Australia) Phil Dent; 7–6, 6–2, 6–3	(Australia) Ross Case	(Australia) Mark Edmondson (Australia) Ken Rosewall	(United States) Matt Mitchell (Australia) Brad Drewett (Australia) Kim Warwick (United States) Tom Gorman
8 Oct	South Pacific Classic; Brisbane, Australia; Grass – $50,000 – 32S/16D	(Australia) Geoff Masters (Australia) Ross Case; 7–6, 6–2	(Australia) John James (Australia) Chris Kachel	(Australia) Mark Edmondson (Australia) Ken Rosewall	(United States) Matt Mitchell (Australia) Brad Drewett (Australia) Kim Warwick (United States) Tom Gorman
15 Oct	Swiss Indoors; Basel, Switzerland; Hard (i) – $75,000 – 32S/16D	(United States) Brian Gottfried; 7–5, 6–1, 4–6, 6–3	(South Africa) Johan Kriek	(France) Yannick Noah (United States) Eddie Dibbs	(Sweden) Björn Borg (Czechoslovakia) Ivan Lendl (Mexico) Raúl Ramírez (France) Pascal Portes
15 Oct	Swiss Indoors; Basel, Switzerland; Hard (i) – $75,000 – 32S/16D	(South Africa) Frew McMillan (South Africa) Bob Hewitt; 6–3, 6–4	(United States) Brian Gottfried (Mexico) Raúl Ramírez	(France) Yannick Noah (United States) Eddie Dibbs	(Sweden) Björn Borg (Czechoslovakia) Ivan Lendl (Mexico) Raúl Ramírez (France) Pascal Portes
15 Oct	Sydney Indoor; Sydney, Australia; Hard (i) – $175,000 – 32S/16D	(United States) Vitas Gerulaitis; 4–6, 6–3, 6–1, 7–6	(Argentina) Guillermo Vilas	(Paraguay) Francisco González (Australia) Kim Warwick	(Australia) John Newcombe (Australia) Dale Collings (Australia) Phil Dent (Austria) Peter Feigl
15 Oct	Sydney Indoor; Sydney, Australia; Hard (i) – $175,000 – 32S/16D	(Paraguay) Francisco González (Australia) Rod Frawley; Walkover	(India) Vijay Amritraj (United States) Pat DuPré	(Paraguay) Francisco González (Australia) Kim Warwick	(Australia) John Newcombe (Australia) Dale Collings (Australia) Phil Dent (Austria) Peter Feigl
22 Oct	Tokyo Outdoor; Tokyo, Japan; Clay – $125,000 – 64S/32D	(United States) Terry Moor; 3–6, 7–6, 6–2	(United States) Pat DuPré	(United States) John Sadri (United Kingdom) Buster Mottram	(Japan) Jun Kamiwazumi (Australia) Kim Warwick (Australia) Rod Frawley (United States) Chris Delaney
22 Oct	Tokyo Outdoor; Tokyo, Japan; Clay – $125,000 – 64S/32D	(Australia) Colin Dibley (United States) Pat DuPré; 3–6, 6–1, 6–1	(Australia) Rod Frawley (Paraguay) Francisco González	(United States) John Sadri (United Kingdom) Buster Mottram	(Japan) Jun Kamiwazumi (Australia) Kim Warwick (Australia) Rod Frawley (United States) Chris Delaney
22 Oct	Fischer-Grand Prix; Vienna, Austria; Hard (i) – $100,000 – 48S/24D; Singles – Doubles	(United States) Stan Smith; 6–4, 6–0, 6–2	(Poland) Wojciech Fibak	(Czechoslovakia) Ivan Lendl (United States) Gene Mayer	(Italy) Corrado Barazzutti (United Kingdom) Mark Cox (Socialist Federal Republic of Yugoslavia) Željko Franulović (South Africa) Frew McMillan
22 Oct	Fischer-Grand Prix; Vienna, Austria; Hard (i) – $100,000 – 48S/24D; Singles – Doubles	(South Africa) Bob Hewitt (South Africa) Frew McMillan; 6–4, 3–6, 6–1	(United States) Brian Gottfried (Mexico) Raúl Ramírez	(Czechoslovakia) Ivan Lendl (United States) Gene Mayer	(Italy) Corrado Barazzutti (United Kingdom) Mark Cox (Socialist Federal Republic of Yugoslavia) Željko Franulović (South Africa) Frew McMillan
29 Oct	European Indoor Championships; Cologne, Germany; Carpet (i) – $75,000 – 32S/16D	(United States) Gene Mayer; 6–3, 3–6, 6–1	(Poland) Wojciech Fibak	(United States) Nick Saviano (Switzerland) Heinz Günthardt	(Socialist Federal Republic of Yugoslavia) Željko Franulović (United States) Bruce Manson (United States) Stan Smith (United States) Eliot Teltscher
29 Oct	European Indoor Championships; Cologne, Germany; Carpet (i) – $75,000 – 32S/16D	(United States) Stan Smith (United States) Gene Mayer; 6–3, 6–4	(Switzerland) Heinz Günthardt (Czechoslovakia) Pavel Složil	(United States) Nick Saviano (Switzerland) Heinz Günthardt	(Socialist Federal Republic of Yugoslavia) Željko Franulović (United States) Bruce Manson (United States) Stan Smith (United States) Eliot Teltscher
29 Oct	Paris Open; Paris, France; Hard (i) – $50,000 – 32S/16D; Singles – Doubles	(United States) Harold Solomon; 6–3, 2–6, 6–3, 6–4	(Italy) Corrado Barazzutti	(United States) Vince Van Patten (United States) Brian Gottfried	(Mexico) Raúl Ramírez (France) Jean-Louis Haillet (France) Pascal Portes (France) Jean-François Caujolle
29 Oct	Paris Open; Paris, France; Hard (i) – $50,000 – 32S/16D; Singles – Doubles	(France) Gilles Moretton (France) Jean-Louis Haillet; 7–6, 7–6	(United Kingdom) John Lloyd (United Kingdom) Tony Lloyd	(United States) Vince Van Patten (United States) Brian Gottfried	(Mexico) Raúl Ramírez (France) Jean-Louis Haillet (France) Pascal Portes (France) Jean-François Caujolle
29 Oct	Tokyo Indoor; Tokyo, Japan; Carpet (i) – $300,000 – 64S/32D; Singles – Doubles	(Sweden) Björn Borg; 6–2, 6–2	(United States) Jimmy Connors	(United States) John Sadri (United States) Vitas Gerulaitis	(United States) Robert Lutz (India) Vijay Amritraj (France) Yannick Noah (United States) Tim Gullikson
29 Oct	Tokyo Indoor; Tokyo, Japan; Carpet (i) – $300,000 – 64S/32D; Singles – Doubles	(United States) Marty Riessen (United States) Sherwood Stewart; 6–4, 7–6	(United States) Mike Cahill (United States) Terry Moor	(United States) John Sadri (United States) Vitas Gerulaitis	(United States) Robert Lutz (India) Vijay Amritraj (France) Yannick Noah (United States) Tim Gullikson

=== November ===
Week	Tournament	Champions	Runners-up	Semifinalists	Quarterfinalists
5 Nov	Colgate-Hong Kong Patrons Classic; Hong Kong; Hard – $75,000 – 32S/16D	(United States) Jimmy Connors; 7–5, 6–3, 6–1	(United States) Pat DuPré	(United Kingdom) Buster Mottram (United States) Roscoe Tanner	(United States) Butch Walts (United States) John Sadri (United States) Tim Wilkison (Australia) Mark Edmondson
5 Nov	Colgate-Hong Kong Patrons Classic; Hong Kong; Hard – $75,000 – 32S/16D	(United States) Pat DuPré (United States) Robert Lutz; 6–3, 6–4	(United States) Steve Denton (United States) Mark Turpin	(United Kingdom) Buster Mottram (United States) Roscoe Tanner	(United States) Butch Walts (United States) John Sadri (United States) Tim Wilkison (Australia) Mark Edmondson
5 Nov	Quito Grand Prix; Quito, Ecuador; Clay – $75,000 – 32S/16D	(Paraguay) Víctor Pecci; 2–6, 6–4, 6–2	(Spain) José Higueras	(Ecuador) Andrés Gómez (Argentina) José Luis Clerc	(Brazil) João Soares (Colombia) Iván Molina (Chile) Hans Gildemeister (Chile) Jaime Fillol
5 Nov	Quito Grand Prix; Quito, Ecuador; Clay – $75,000 – 32S/16D	(Chile) Álvaro Fillol (Chile) Jaime Fillol; 6–7, 6–3, 6–1	(Colombia) Iván Molina (Colombia) Jairo Velasco Sr.	(Ecuador) Andrés Gómez (Argentina) José Luis Clerc	(Brazil) João Soares (Colombia) Iván Molina (Chile) Hans Gildemeister (Chile) Jaime Fillol
5 Nov	Stockholm Open; Stockholm, Sweden; Hard (i) – $175,000 – 64S/32D; Singles – Doubles	(United States) John McEnroe; 6–7, 6–3, 6–3	(United States) Gene Mayer	(Poland) Wojciech Fibak (United States) Brian Gottfried	(United States) Nick Saviano (United States) Peter Fleming (United States) Tim Gullikson (United States) Harold Solomon
5 Nov	Stockholm Open; Stockholm, Sweden; Hard (i) – $175,000 – 64S/32D; Singles – Doubles	(United States) John McEnroe (United States) Peter Fleming; 6–4, 6–4	(Poland) Wojciech Fibak (Netherlands) Tom Okker	(Poland) Wojciech Fibak (United States) Brian Gottfried	(United States) Nick Saviano (United States) Peter Fleming (United States) Tim Gullikson (United States) Harold Solomon
12 Nov	Colgate Grand Prix of Bogota; Bogotá, Colombia; Clay – $50,000 – 32S/12D	(Paraguay) Víctor Pecci; 6–3, 6–4	(Colombia) Jairo Velasco Sr.	(West Germany) Reinhart Probst (Ecuador) Raúl Viver	(Spain) José Higueras (Brazil) Roger Guedes (Colombia) Alejandro Cortes (Brazil) Thomaz Koch
12 Nov	Colgate Grand Prix of Bogota; Bogotá, Colombia; Clay – $50,000 – 32S/12D	(Colombia) Jairo Velasco Sr. (Mexico) Emilio Montaño; 6–2, 6–4	(United States) Bruce Nichols (United States) Charles Owens	(West Germany) Reinhart Probst (Ecuador) Raúl Viver	(Spain) José Higueras (Brazil) Roger Guedes (Colombia) Alejandro Cortes (Brazil) Thomaz Koch
12 Nov	Cathay Trust Championships; Taipei, Taiwan; Carpet (i) – $75,000 – 32S/16D	(United States) Robert Lutz; 6–3, 6–4, 2–6, 6–3	(United States) Pat DuPré	(Australia) Kim Warwick (United States) Bill Scanlon	(United States) Roscoe Tanner (West Germany) Jürgen Fassbender (Australia) Mark Edmondson (Sweden) Stefan Simonsson
12 Nov	Cathay Trust Championships; Taipei, Taiwan; Carpet (i) – $75,000 – 32S/16D	(Australia) John Marks (Australia) Mark Edmondson; 6–1, 3–6, 6–4	(United States) Pat DuPré (United States) Robert Lutz	(Australia) Kim Warwick (United States) Bill Scanlon	(United States) Roscoe Tanner (West Germany) Jürgen Fassbender (Australia) Mark Edmondson (Sweden) Stefan Simonsson
12 Nov	Wembley Championships; London, England; Carpet (i) – $175,000 – 32S/16D; Singles – Doubles	(United States) John McEnroe; 6–3, 6–4, 7–5	(United States) Harold Solomon	(Italy) Gianni Ocleppo (United States) Hank Pfister	(Poland) Wojciech Fibak (United States) Ferdi Taygan (United States) Stan Smith (United States) Tim Gullikson
12 Nov	Wembley Championships; London, England; Carpet (i) – $175,000 – 32S/16D; Singles – Doubles	(United States) John McEnroe (United States) Peter Fleming; 6–2, 6–3	(Czechoslovakia) Tomáš Šmíd (United States) Stan Smith	(Italy) Gianni Ocleppo (United States) Hank Pfister	(Poland) Wojciech Fibak (United States) Ferdi Taygan (United States) Stan Smith (United States) Tim Gullikson
19 Nov	Italian Indoor Open; Bologna, Italy; Carpet (i) – $75,000 – 32S/16D	(United States) Butch Walts; 6–3, 6–2	(Italy) Gianni Ocleppo	(United States) John McEnroe (United Kingdom) Mark Cox	(Czechoslovakia) Stanislav Birner (France) Bernard Fritz (Italy) Corrado Barazzutti (United States) Fritz Buehning
19 Nov	Italian Indoor Open; Bologna, Italy; Carpet (i) – $75,000 – 32S/16D	(United States) John McEnroe (United States) Peter Fleming; 6–1, 6–1	(United States) Fritz Buehning (United States) Ferdi Taygan	(United States) John McEnroe (United Kingdom) Mark Cox	(Czechoslovakia) Stanislav Birner (France) Bernard Fritz (Italy) Corrado Barazzutti (United States) Fritz Buehning
19 Nov	Indian Open; Bombay, India; Clay – $75,000 – 32S/16D	(India) Vijay Amritraj; 6–1, 7–5	(West Germany) Peter Elter	(West Germany) Wolfgang Popp (Netherlands) Louk Sanders	(Australia) Ernie Ewert (France) Jean-Louis Haillet (United States) Tony Graham (Australia) Kim Warwick
19 Nov	Indian Open; Bombay, India; Clay – $75,000 – 32S/16D	(United States) Jim Delaney (United States) Chris Delaney; 7–6, 6–2	(West Germany) Thomas Fürst (West Germany) Wolfgang Popp	(West Germany) Wolfgang Popp (Netherlands) Louk Sanders	(Australia) Ernie Ewert (France) Jean-Louis Haillet (United States) Tony Graham (Australia) Kim Warwick
19 Nov	South American Open; Buenos Aires, Argentina; Clay – $175,000 – 32S/16D; Singles	(Argentina) Guillermo Vilas; 6–1, 6–2, 6–2	(Argentina) José Luis Clerc	(United States) Eddie Dibbs (Czechoslovakia) Ivan Lendl	(Czechoslovakia) Tomáš Šmíd (Hungary) Balázs Taróczy (United States) Terry Moor (Spain) José Higueras
19 Nov	South American Open; Buenos Aires, Argentina; Clay – $175,000 – 32S/16D; Singles	(United States) Sherwood Stewart (Czechoslovakia) Tomáš Šmíd; 6–1, 7–5	(Brazil) Marcos Hocevar (Brazil) João Soares	(United States) Eddie Dibbs (Czechoslovakia) Ivan Lendl	(Czechoslovakia) Tomáš Šmíd (Hungary) Balázs Taróczy (United States) Terry Moor (Spain) José Higueras
26 Nov	Santiago International Classic; Santiago, Chile; Clay – $50,000 – 32S/16D	(Chile) Hans Gildemeister; 7–5, 5–7, 6–4	(Spain) José Higueras	(Chile) Pedro Rebolledo (Chile) Jaime Fillol	(Colombia) Jairo Velasco Sr. (Chile) Juan Nunez (Argentina) Ricardo Cano (Chile) Ricardo Acuña
26 Nov	Santiago International Classic; Santiago, Chile; Clay – $50,000 – 32S/16D	(Spain) José Higueras / (Colombia) Jairo Velasco Sr. vs (Chile) Álvaro Fillol / (Chile) Jaime Fillol; Suspended		(Chile) Pedro Rebolledo (Chile) Jaime Fillol	(Colombia) Jairo Velasco Sr. (Chile) Juan Nunez (Argentina) Ricardo Cano (Chile) Ricardo Acuña
26 Nov	South African Open; Johannesburg, South Africa; Hard – $175,000 – 32S/16D	(Zimbabwe Rhodesia) Andrew Pattison; 2–6, 6–3, 6–2, 6–3	(Paraguay) Víctor Pecci	(United States) Ferdi Taygan (Argentina) José Luis Clerc	(South Africa) Bernard Mitton (United States) Terry Moor (Switzerland) Heinz Günthardt (West Germany) Rolf Gehring
26 Nov	South African Open; Johannesburg, South Africa; Hard – $175,000 – 32S/16D	(South Africa) Frew McMillan (South Africa) Bob Hewitt; 1–6, 6–1, 6–4	(United States) Mike Cahill (United Kingdom) Buster Mottram	(United States) Ferdi Taygan (Argentina) José Luis Clerc	(South Africa) Bernard Mitton (United States) Terry Moor (Switzerland) Heinz Günthardt (West Germany) Rolf Gehring

=== December ===
Week	Tournament	Champions	Runners-up	Semifinalists	Quarterfinalists
17 Dec	New South Wales Championships; Sydney, Australia; Grass – $100,000 – 64S/32D	(Australia) Phil Dent; 6–4, 6–4, 7–5	(United States) Hank Pfister	(Argentina) Guillermo Vilas (Australia) John James	(Australia) Brad Drewett (Australia) Kim Warwick (Hungary) Balázs Taróczy (United States) Sherwood Stewart
17 Dec	New South Wales Championships; Sydney, Australia; Grass – $100,000 – 64S/32D	(Australia) Peter McNamara (Australia) Paul McNamee; 7–6, 6–3	(Australia) Steve Docherty (United States) Christopher Lewis	(Argentina) Guillermo Vilas (Australia) John James	(Australia) Brad Drewett (Australia) Kim Warwick (Hungary) Balázs Taróczy (United States) Sherwood Stewart
24 Dec; 31 Dec	Australian Open; Melbourne, Australia; Grand Slam; Grass – $350,000 – 64S/32D; Singles – Doubles	(Argentina) Guillermo Vilas; 7–6, 6–3, 6–2	(United States) John Sadri	(United States) Victor Amaya (Australia) Colin Dibley	(Australia) Phil Dent (United States) Peter Rennert (Australia) Rod Frawley (Australia) Mark Edmondson
24 Dec; 31 Dec	Australian Open; Melbourne, Australia; Grand Slam; Grass – $350,000 – 64S/32D; Singles – Doubles	(Australia) Peter McNamara (Australia) Paul McNamee; 7–6, 6–2	(Australia) Paul Kronk (Australia) Cliff Letcher	(United States) Victor Amaya (Australia) Colin Dibley	(Australia) Phil Dent (United States) Peter Rennert (Australia) Rod Frawley (Australia) Mark Edmondson

=== January 1980 ===
Week	Tournament	Champions	Runners-up	Semifinalists	Quarterfinalists
7 Jan	1979 Colgate-Palmolive Masters; New York City, US; Carpet (i) – $400,000 – 8S/4D; Singles – Doubles	(Sweden) Björn Borg; 6–2, 6–2	(United States) Vitas Gerulaitis	(United States) Jimmy Connors (United States) John McEnroe	Round robin (United States) Harold Solomon (Argentina) Guillermo Vilas (United States) Roscoe Tanner (Spain) José Higueras
7 Jan	1979 Colgate-Palmolive Masters; New York City, US; Carpet (i) – $400,000 – 8S/4D; Singles – Doubles	(United States) Peter Fleming (United States) John McEnroe; 6–3, 7–6, 6–1	(Poland) Wojciech Fibak (Netherlands) Tom Okker	(United States) Jimmy Connors (United States) John McEnroe	Round robin (United States) Harold Solomon (Argentina) Guillermo Vilas (United States) Roscoe Tanner (Spain) José Higueras

== Points system ==
The tournaments were divided into twelve point categories. The highest points were allocated to the Grand Slam tournaments; French Open, the Wimbledon Championships, the US Open and the Australian Open. Points were allocated based on these categories and the finishing position of a player in a tournament. The points table is based on a 32 player draw. No points were awarded to first-round losers and advancements by default were equal to winning a round. The points allocation, with doubles points listed in brackets, was as follows:

	Grand Slam	$300,000+	$275,000+	$250,000+	$225,000+	$200,000+	$175,000+	$150,000+	$125,000+	$100,000+	$75,000+	$50,000+
Category	1	2	3	4	5	6	7	8	9	10	11	12
Winner	350 (70)	300 (60)	275 (55)	250 (50)	225 (45)	200 (40)	175 (35)	150 (30)	125 (25)	100 (20)	75 (15)	50 (10)
Runner-up	245 (49)	210 (42)	192 (38)	175 (35)	157 (31)	140 (28)	122 (24)	104 (20)	87 (17)	70 (14)	52 (10)	35 (7)
Semifinalist	140 (28)	120 (24)	110 (22)	100 (20)	90 (18)	80 (16)	70 (14)	60 (12)	50 (10)	40 (8)	30 (6)	20 (4)
Quarterfinalist	70 (14)	60 (12)	55 (11)	50 (10)	45 (9)	40 (8)	35 (7)	30 (6)	25 (5)	20 (4)	15 (3)	10 (2)
Fourth round	35 (7)	30 (6)	27 (6)	25 (5)	22 (5)	20 (4)	17 (3)	14 (3)	12 (2)	10 (2)	7 (–)	5 (–)
Third round	17 (3)	15 (–)	13 (–)	12 (–)	11 (–)	10 (–)	9 (–)	7 (–)	6 (–)	5 (–)	– (–)	– (–)
Second round	9 (–)	– (–)	– (–)	6 (–)	– (–)	– (–)	– (–)	– (–)	– (–)	– (–)	– (–)	– (–)

== Top tournaments ranked by Grand Prix points & prize money ==
Tournament	Prize money	Category
The four Grand Slam tournaments		1
Colgate-Palmolive Masters	$400,000	
Tokyo	$300,000	2
Rancho Mirage (Palm Springs)	$250,000	4
Memphis	$250,000	4
Philadelphia	$250,000	4
Las Vegas	$250,000	4
Italian Open	$200,000	6
Milan	$200,000	6

== Grand Prix standings ==
Rk	Name	Points	Bonus
1	John McEnroe (USA)	2,414	$300,000
2	Björn Borg (SWE)	2,367	$200,000
3	Jimmy Connors (USA)	2,043	$150,000
4	Guillermo Vilas (ARG)	1,834	$100,000
5	Vitas Gerulaitis (USA)	1,707	$80,000
6	Roscoe Tanner (USA)	1,454	$60,000
7	José Higueras (ESP)	1,273	$50,000
8	Harold Solomon (USA)	1,182	$40,000
9	Eddie Dibbs (USA)	1,100	$35,000
10	Víctor Pecci (PAR)	997	$30,000

== ATP rankings ==
As of 1 January 1979
Rk	Name
1	Jimmy Connors (USA)
2	Björn Borg (SWE)
3	Guillermo Vilas (ARG)
4	John McEnroe (USA)
5	Vitas Gerulaitis (USA)
6	Eddie Dibbs (USA)
7	Brian Gottfried (USA)
8	Raúl Ramírez (MEX)
9	Harold Solomon (USA)
10	Corrado Barazzutti (ITA)
11	Roscoe Tanner (USA)
12	Manuel Orantes (ESP)
13	Arthur Ashe (USA)
14	José Higueras (ESP)
15	José Luis Clerc (ARG)
16	Ilie Năstase (ROU)
17	Sandy Mayer (USA)
18	Tim Gullikson (USA)
19	Dick Stockton (USA)
20	Balázs Taróczy (HUN)

Year-end rankings 1979 (7 January 1980)
Rk	Name	Points	Average	High	Low	Change
1	Björn Borg (SWE)	1497	93.56			▲ +1
2	Jimmy Connors (USA)	1366	91.07			▼ –1
3	John McEnroe (USA)	1614	84.95			▲ +1
4	Vitas Gerulaitis (USA)	1166	64.78			▲ +1
5	Roscoe Tanner (USA)	1139	59.95			▲ +6
6	Guillermo Vilas (ARG)	1199	52.13			▼ –3
7	Arthur Ashe (USA)	535	44.58			▲ +6
8	Harold Solomon (USA)	815	40.75			▲ +1
9	José Higueras (ESP)	853	40.62			▲ +5
10	Eddie Dibbs (USA)	750	39.47			▼ –4
11	Víctor Pecci (PAR)	748	35.62			▲ +35
12	Gene Mayer (USA)	742	32.26			▲ +52
13	Peter Fleming (USA)	663	31.57			▲ +13
14	Hans Gildemeister (CHI)	406	31.23			▲ +13
15	Wojciech Fibak (POL)	652	29.64			▲ +6
16	José Luis Clerc (ARG)	629	27.35			▼ –1
17	Brian Gottfried (USA)	650	27.08			▼ –10
18	Pat DuPré (USA)	643	23.81			▲ +15
19	Manuel Orantes (ESP)	375	23.44			▼ –7
20	Ivan Lendl (TCH)	416	21.89			▲ +54

*The official ATP year-end rankings were listed from 7 January 1980.

== List of tournament winners ==
The list of winners and number of singles titles won, alphabetically by last name:

- (Australia) John Alexander (1) Louisville
- (United States) Victor Amaya (1) Surbiton
- (India) Vijay Amritraj (1) Bombay
- (Sweden) Björn Borg (12) Richmond WCT, Boca Raton, Rotterdam, Monte Carlo, Las Vegas, French Open, Wimbledon, Båstad, Toronto, Palermo, Tokyo Indoor, WCT Challenge Cup
- (Argentina) José Luis Clerc (1) Johannesburg
- (United States) Jimmy Connors (7) Birmingham, Philadelphia, Memphis, Tulsa, Indianapolis, Stowe, Hong Kong
- (Australia) Phil Dent (2) Brisbane, Sydney Outdoor
- (United States) Eddie Dibbs (1) Forest Hills WCT
- (Austria) Peter Feigl (1) Cairo
- (Poland) Wojciech Fibak (2) Denver, Stuttgart Indoor
- (United States) Peter Fleming (2) Cincinnati, Los Angeles
- (United States) Vitas Gerulaitis (3) Rome, Kitzbühel, Sydney Indoor
- (Chile) Hans Gildemeister (2) Barcelona, Santiago
- (United States) Brian Gottfried (2) Columbus, Basel
- (Spain) José Higueras (3) Houston, Hamburg, Boston
- (Austria) Hans Kary (1) Lagos
- (South Africa) Johan Kriek (1) Sarasota
- (United States) Robert Lutz (1) Taiwan
- (United States) Gene Mayer (1) Cologne
- (United States) John McEnroe (10) New Orleans, Milan, San Jose, Dallas WCT, Queen's Club, South Orange, US Open, San Francisco, Stockholm, Wembley
- (Australia) Peter McNamara (1) Berlin
- (South Africa) Bernard Mitton (1) Costa Rica
- (United States) Terry Moor (1) Tokyo Outdoor
- (France) Yannick Noah (3) Nancy, Madrid, Bordeaux
- (Netherlands) Tom Okker (1) Tel Aviv
- (Spain) Manuel Orantes (1) Munich
- (Rhodesia) Andrew Pattison (1) Johannesburg
- (Paraguay) Víctor Pecci (3) Nice, Quito, Bogotá
- (West Germany) Ulrich Pinner (1) Gstaad
- (Mexico) Raúl Ramírez (1) Florence
- (United States) Marty Riessen (1) Lafayette
- (United States) Bill Scanlon (1) Maui
- (Czechoslovakia) Tomáš Šmíd (1) Stuttgart Outdoor
- (United States) Stan Smith (2) Cleveland, Vienna
- (United States) Harold Solomon (3) Baltimore WCT, North Conway, Bercy
- (United States) Roscoe Tanner (2) Rancho Mirage, Washington Indoor
- (Hungary) Balázs Taróczy (2) Brussels, Hilversum
- (United States) Brian Teacher (1) Newport
- (Argentina) Guillermo Vilas (4) Hobart, Washington, D.C., Buenos Aires, Australian Open
- (United States) Butch Walts (2) Dayton, Bologna
- (Australia) Kim Warwick (1) Adelaide
- (United States) Tim Wilkison (1) Auckland

The following players won their first title in 1979:

- (Chile) Hans Gildemeister Barcelona
- (Austria) Hans Kary Lagos
- (South Africa) Johan Kriek Sarasota
- (Australia) Peter McNamara Berlin

== See also ==
- World Championship Tennis
- 1979 WTA Tour
