= 1979 Volvo Tennis Classic =

- Date: March 12–18
- Edition: 8th
- Category: Grand Prix
- Draw: 32S / 16D
- Prize money: $125,000
- Surface: Carpet / indoor
- Location: Washington, D.C., United States
- Venue: Charles E. Smith Center

Champions

Singles
- (United States) Roscoe Tanner

Doubles
- (United States) Bob Lutz / (United States) Stan Smith
- Washington Indoor

The 1979 Volvo Tennis Classic, also known as the Washington Indoor, was a men's tennis tournament played on indoor carpet courts at the Charles E. Smith Center in Washington, D.C. in the United States that was part of the 1979 Grand Prix circuit. It was the eighth edition of the tournament and was held from March 12 through March 18, 1979. Fourth-seeded Roscoe Tanner won the singles title at the event and earned $24,000 first-prize money after defeating the defending champion, second-seeded Brian Gottfried in the final.

== Finals ==
=== Singles ===
(United States) Roscoe Tanner defeated (United States) Brian Gottfried 6–4, 6–4

- It was Tanner's 2nd singles title of the year and the 13th of his career.

=== Doubles ===
(United States) Bob Lutz / (United States) Stan Smith defeated (Australia) Bob Carmichael / (United States) Brian Teacher 6–4, 7–5, 3–6, 7–6

== See also ==
- 1979 Washington Star International
- 1979 Avon Championships of Washington
