= 1979 Madrid Grand Prix =

- Date: 24–30 September
- Edition: 8th
- Category: Grand Prix
- Draw: 64S / 28D
- Prize money: $75,000
- Surface: Clay / outdoor
- Location: Madrid, Spain
- Venue: Real Sociedad Hípica Española Club de Campo

Champions

Singles
- (France) Yannick Noah

Doubles
- (Brazil) Cássio Motta / (Brazil) Carlos Kirmayr
- Madrid Tennis Grand Prix

The 1979 Madrid Grand Prix was a men's tennis tournament played on outdoor clay courts that was part of the 1979 Colgate-Palmolive Grand Prix tennis circuit. It was the eighth edition of the tournament and was held at the Real Sociedad Hípica Española Club de Campo in Madrid, Spain from 24 September until 30 September 1979. Fifth-seeded Yannick Noah won the singles title.

== Finals ==
=== Singles ===
(France) Yannick Noah defeated (Spain) Manuel Orantes 6–3, 6–7, 6–3, 6–2

- It was Noah's 2nd singles title of the year and the 4th of his career.

=== Doubles ===
(Brazil) Cássio Motta / (Brazil) Carlos Kirmayr defeated (United Kingdom) Robin Drysdale / (United Kingdom) John Feaver 7–6, 6–4

- It was Motta's only doubles title of the year and of the 4th of his career. It was Kirmayr's 2nd and last doubles title of the year and the 5th of his career.
