= 1979 Berlin Open =

- Date: 18–24 June
- Edition: 5th
- Category: Grand Prix
- Draw: 32S / 16D
- Prize money: $50,000
- Surface: Clay / outdoor
- Location: Berlin, West Germany

Champions

Singles
- (Australia) Peter McNamara

Doubles
- (Brazil) Carlos Kirmayr / (Czechoslovakia) Ivan Lendl
- Berlin Open

The 1979 Berlin Open, also known as the International Championships of Berlin, was a men's tennis tournament staged in Berlin, West Germany that was part of the Grand Prix circuit. The tournament was played on outdoor clay courts and was held from 18 June until 24 June 1979. It was the fifth and last edition of the tournament. Sixth-seeded Peter McNamara won the singles title.

== Finals ==
=== Singles ===
(Australia) Peter McNamara defeated (France) Patrice Dominguez 6–4, 6–0, 6–7, 6–2

- It was McNamara's first singles title of his career.

=== Doubles ===
(Brazil) Carlos Kirmayr / (Czechoslovakia) Ivan Lendl and (Venezuela) Jorge Andrew / (Czechoslovakia) Stanislav Birner 6–2, 6–1
