= 1979 Quito Grand Prix =

Tennis tournament

- Date: 5–11 November
- Edition: 1st
- Category: Grand Prix
- Draw: 32S / 16D
- Prize money: $75,000
- Surface: Clay / outdoor
- Location: Quito, Ecuador

Champions

Singles
- (Paraguay) Víctor Pecci

Doubles
- (Chile) Álvaro Fillol / (Chile) Jaime Fillol
Quito Open	· 1980 →

The 1979 Quito Grand Prix was a men's tennis tournament played on outdoor clay courts in Quito, Ecuador that was part of the Grand Prix tennis circuit. It was the inaugural edition of the tournament and was held from 5 November until 11 November 1979. Third-seeded Víctor Pecci won the singles title.

== Finals ==
=== Singles ===
(Paraguay) Víctor Pecci defeated (Spain) José Higueras 2–6, 6–4, 6–2

- It was Pecci's 2nd singles title of the year and the 5th of his career.

=== Doubles ===
(Chile) Álvaro Fillol / (Chile) Jaime Fillol defeated (Colombia) Iván Molina / (Colombia) Jairo Velasco Sr. 6–7, 6–3, 6–1
