= 1979 Dutch Open (tennis) =

- Date: 23–29 July
- Edition: 22nd
- Category: Grand Prix
- Draw: 32S / 16D
- Prize money: $75,000
- Surface: Clay / outdoor
- Location: Hilversum, Netherlands
- Venue: 't Melkhuisje

Champions

Singles
- (Hungary) Balázs Taróczy

Doubles
- (Netherlands) Tom Okker / (Hungary) Balázs Taróczy
- Dutch Open

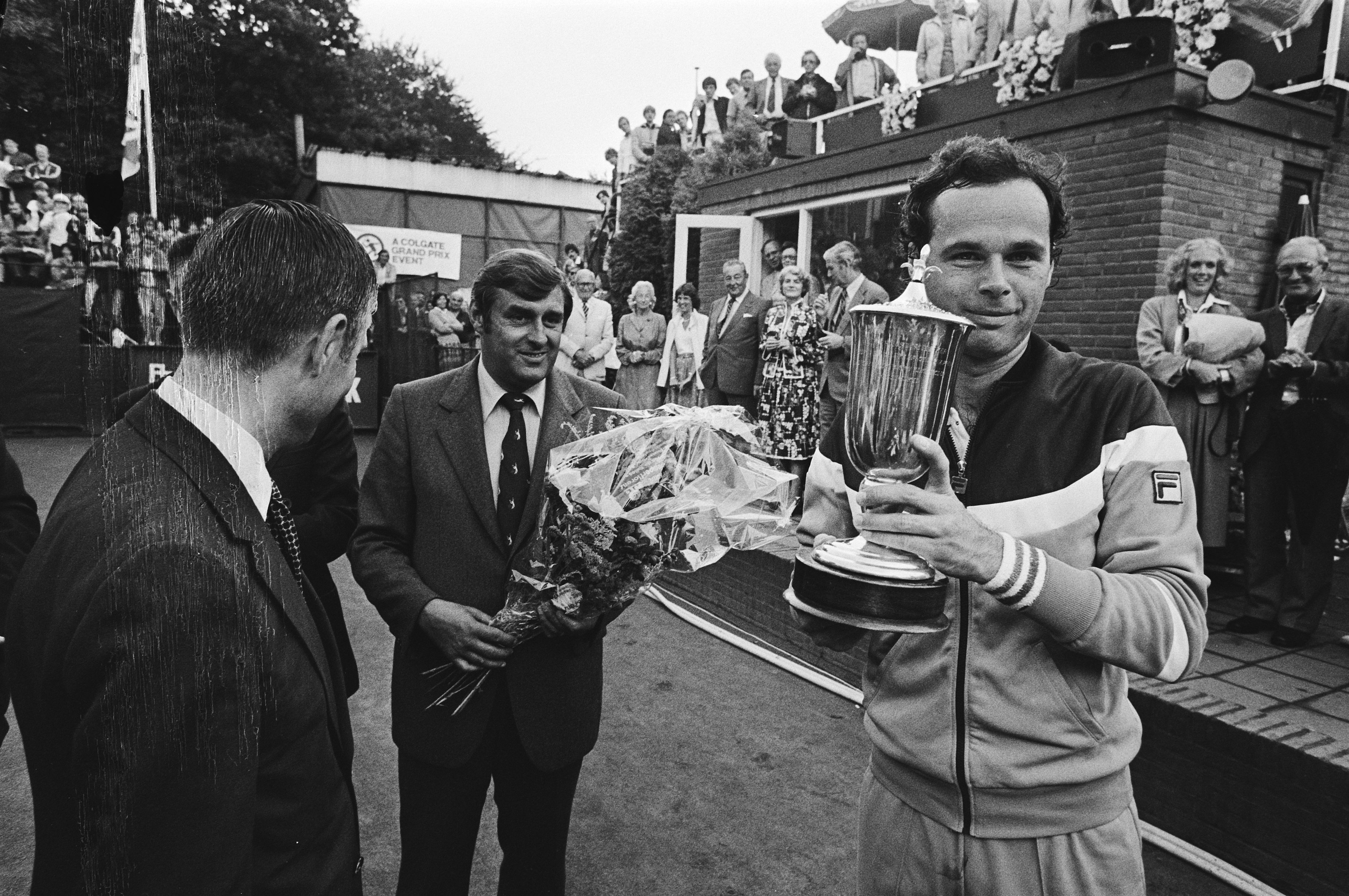
Winner Taroczy with his trophy

The 1979 Dutch Open was a men's Grand Prix tennis tournament staged in Hilversum, Netherlands. The tournament was played on outdoor clay courts and was held from 23 July until 29 July 1979. It was the 22nd edition of the tournament. Second-seeded Balázs Taróczy won the singles title.

== Finals ==
=== Singles ===
(Hungary) Balázs Taróczy defeated (Czechoslovakia) Tomáš Šmíd 6–2, 6–2, 6–1

=== Doubles ===
(Netherlands) Tom Okker / (Hungary) Balázs Taróczy defeated (Czechoslovakia) Jan Kodeš / (Czechoslovakia) Tomáš Šmíd 6–1, 6–3
