= 1979 Friendship Tournament =

- Date: 19–25 March
- Edition: 1st
- Category: Grand Prix
- Draw: 32S / 16D
- Prize money: $50,000
- Surface: Hard / outdoor
- Location: San José, Costa Rica

Champions

Singles
- (South Africa) Bernard Mitton

Doubles
- (Romania) Ion Țiriac / (Argentina) Guillermo Vilas
- Friendship Cup

The 1979 Friendship Tournament was a men's tennis tournament played on outdoor hardcourts in San José, Costa Rica that was part of the 1979 Colgate-Palmolive Grand Prix. It was the inaugural edition of the tournament and was held from 19 March through 25 March 1979. Seventh-seeded Bernard Mitton won the singles title.

== Finals ==
=== Singles ===
(South Africa) Bernard Mitton defeated (United States) Tom Gorman 6–4, 6–1, 6–3

- It was Mitton's only singles title of the year and the 2nd and last of his career.

=== Doubles ===
(Romania) Ion Țiriac / (Argentina) Guillermo Vilas defeated (India) Anand Amritraj / (Australia) Colin Dibley 6–4, 2–6, 6–4

- It was Țiriac's 1st doubles title of the year and the 22nd of his career. It was Vilas's 1st doubles title of the year and the 15th of his career.
