= 1979 Mercedes Cup =

- Date: 16–22 July
- Edition: 2nd
- Category: Grand Prix
- Draw: 32S / 16D
- Prize money: $75,000
- Surface: Clay / outdoor
- Location: Stuttgart, West Germany
- Venue: Tennis Club Weissenhof

Champions

Singles
- (Czechoslovakia) Tomáš Šmíd

Doubles
- (South Africa) Frew McMillan / (Switzerland) Colin Dowdeswell
- Stuttgart Open

The 1979 Mercedes Cup was a men's tennis tournament played on outdoor clay courts and held in Stuttgart, West Germany that was part of the 1979 Grand Prix circuit. It was the second edition of the tournament and was held from 16 July until 22 July 1979. Fourth-seeded Tomáš Šmíd won the singles title.

== Finals ==
=== Singles ===
(Czechoslovakia) Tomáš Šmíd defeated (West Germany) Ulrich Pinner, 6–4, 6–0, 6–2

- It was Šmíd's 1st singles title of the year and the 2nd of his career.

=== Doubles ===
(South Africa) Frew McMillan / (Switzerland) Colin Dowdeswell defeated (Poland) Wojciech Fibak / (Czechoslovakia) Pavel Složil, 6–4, 6–2, 2–6, 6–4
