= 1979 Alan King Tennis Classic =

- Date: April 23–29
- Edition: 8th
- Category: Grand Prix
- Draw: 32S / 16D
- Prize money: $250,000
- Surface: Hard / outdoor
- Location: Las Vegas, NV, U.S.
- Venue: Caesars Palace

Champions

Singles
- (Sweden) Björn Borg

Doubles
- (United States) Sherwood Stewart / (United States) Marty Riessen
- Alan King Tennis Classic

The 1979 Alan King Tennis Classic was a men's tennis tournament played on outdoor hard courts at the Caesars Palace in Las Vegas, Nevada in the United States that was part of the 1979 Colgate-Palmolive Grand Prix. It was the eighth edition of the tournament was held from April 23 through April 29, 1979. First-seeded Björn Borg won the singles title and earned $33,750 first-prize money.

== Finals ==
=== Singles ===
(Sweden) Björn Borg defeated (United States) Jimmy Connors 6–3, 6–2

- It was Borg's 5th singles title of the year and the 44th of his career.

=== Doubles ===
(United States) Sherwood Stewart / (United States) Marty Riessen defeated (Italy) Adriano Panatta / (Mexico) Raúl Ramírez 4–6, 6–4, 7–6^{(9–7)}
