= 1979 Mutual Benefit Life Open =

- Date: July 30 – August 5
- Edition: 10th
- Category: Grand Prix
- Draw: 32S/16D
- Prize money: $75,000
- Surface: Clay / outdoor
- Location: South Orange, New Jersey, US
- Venue: Orange Lawn Tennis Club

Champions

Singles
- (United States) John McEnroe

Doubles
- (United States) John McEnroe / (United States) Peter Fleming
- South Orange Open

The 1979 Mutual Benefit Life Open, also known as the South Orange Open, was a man's tennis tournament played on outdoor clay courts at the Orange Lawn Tennis Club in South Orange, New Jersey in the United States. The event was part of the 1979 Grand Prix circuit. It was the tenth edition of the tournament and was held from July 30 through August 5, 1979. First-seeded John McEnroe won the singles title and earned $13,000 first-prize money.

== Finals ==
=== Singles ===
(United States) John McEnroe defeated (United Kingdom) John Lloyd 6–7^{(1–7)}, 6–4, 6–0

- It was McEnroe' 6th singles title of the year and the 11th of his career.

=== Doubles ===
(United States) John McEnroe / (United States) Peter Fleming defeated (United States) Fritz Buehning / (United States) Bruce Nichols 6–1, 6–3
