= 1979 Gray International Open =

- Date: August 13–19 (Note: Due to rain the finals were postponed and played on Monday, August 20.)
- Edition: 5th
- Category: Grand Prix
- Draw: 32S / 16D
- Prize money: $50,000
- Surface: Hard / outdoor
- Location: Cleveland, Ohio, U.S.
- Venue: Harold T. Clark Tennis Stadium

Champions

Singles
- (United States) Stan Smith

Doubles
- (United States) Stan Smith / (United States) Robert Lutz
- Grand Prix Cleveland

The 1979 Gray International Open, also known as the Cleveland Grand Prix, was a men's tennis tournament held on outdoor hard courts at the Harold T. Clark Tennis Stadium in Cleveland, Ohio in the United States that was part of the 1979 Grand Prix circuit. It was the fifth edition of the tournament and was held from August 13 through August 19, 1979. Second-seeded Stan Smith won the singles title and earned $10,000 first-prize money.

== Finals ==
=== Singles ===
(United States) Stan Smith defeated (Romania) Ilie Năstase 6–3, 6–4

- It was Smith' 1st singles title of the year and the 52nd of his career in the Open Era.

=== Doubles ===
(United States) Stan Smith / (United States) Robert Lutz defeated (Paraguay) Francisco González / (United States) Fred McNair 6–3, 6–4
