= 1979 National Revenue Tennis Classic =

- Date: August 6–12
- Edition: 10th
- Category: Grand Prix
- Draw: 32S / 16D
- Prize money: $75,000
- Surface: Clay / outdoor
- Location: Columbus, Ohio, United States
- Venue: Muirfield Village

Champions

Singles
- (United States) Brian Gottfried

Doubles
- (United States) Brian Gottfried / (United States) Bob Lutz
- Columbus Open

The 1979 National Revenue Tennis Classic, also known as the Buckeye Championships, was a men's tennis tournament played on outdoor clay courts at the Muirfield Village in Dublin, a suburb of Columbus, Ohio in the United States that was part of the 1979 Grand Prix circuit. It was the tenth edition of the tournament and was held from August 6 through August 12, 1979. Second-seeded Brian Gottfried won the singles title.

== Finals ==
=== Singles ===
(United States) Brian Gottfried defeated (United States) Eddie Dibbs 6–3, 6–0

- It was Gottfried's 1st singles title of the year and 16th of his career.

=== Doubles ===
(United States) Brian Gottfried / (United States) Bob Lutz defeated (United States) Tim Gullikson / (United States) Tom Gullikson 4–6, 6–3, 7–6^{(7–1)}
