= 1979 Colgate Grand Prix of Bogota =

- Date: 12–18 November
- Edition: 3rd
- Category: Grand Prix
- Draw: 32S / 16D
- Prize money: $50,000
- Surface: Clay / outdoor
- Location: Bogotá, Colombia

Champions

Singles
- (Paraguay) Víctor Pecci

Doubles
- (Mexico) Emilio Montaño / (Colombia) Jairo Velasco Sr.
- International Tennis Championships of Colombia

The 1979 Colgate Grand Prix of Bogota was a men's tennis tournament played on outdoor clay courts in Bogotá, Colombia that was part of the 1979 Colgate-Palmolive Grand Prix. It was the third edition of the tournament and was held from 12 November through 18 November 1979. Second-seeded Víctor Pecci won his second consecutive singles title at the event.

== Finals ==
=== Singles ===
(Paraguay) Víctor Pecci defeated (Colombia) Jairo Velasco Sr. 6–3, 6–4

- It was Pecci's 3rd and last singles title of the year and the 6th of his career.

=== Doubles ===
(Mexico) Emilio Montaño / (Colombia) Jairo Velasco Sr. defeated (United States) Bruce Nichols / (United States) Charles Owens 6–2, 6–4

- It was Montaño's only doubles title of his career. It was Velasco's only doubles title of the year and the 2nd and last of his career.
