= 1979 Tel Aviv Open – Doubles =

Doubles
- 1979 Tel Aviv Open

Final
- Champions: (Romania) Ilie Năstase (Netherlands) Tom Okker
- Runners-up: (United States) Mike Cahill (Australia) Colin Dibley
- Score: 7–5, 6–4

Details
- Draw: 16
- Seeds: 4

Events
Singles	Doubles
- Tel Aviv Open

This was the first edition of the event.

Ilie Năstase and Tom Okker won the title, defeating Mike Cahill and Colin Dibley 7–5, 6–4 in the final.

== Seeds ==
1. (Romania) Ilie Năstase / (Netherlands) Tom Okker (champions)
2. (United States) Mike Cahill / (Australia) Colin Dibley (final)
3. (United Kingdom) John Feaver / (South Africa) Frew McMillan (semifinals)
4. (United Kingdom) Robin Drysdale / (United Kingdom) Richard Lewis (quarterfinals)

== Draw ==
Key

- Q = Qualifier
- WC = Wild card
- LL = Lucky loser
- Alt = Alternate
- ITF = ITF entry
- PR = Protected ranking
- SR = Special ranking
- SE = Special exempt
- JE = Junior exempt
- JR = Junior Accelerator Programme entrant
- CO = College Accelerator Programme entrant
- NG = Next Gen Accelerator Program entrant
- w/o = Walkover
- r = Retired
- d = Defaulted

=== Draw ===
First round
1	(Romania) I Năstase (Netherlands) T Okker	6	6
(United States) C Leeds (Republic of Ireland) S Sorensen	4	2
(Sweden) P Hjertquist (Sweden) S Simonsson	2	2
(Israel) Shai Puni (Israel) Ilan Sher	6	6
4	(United Kingdom) R Drysdale (United Kingdom) R Lewis	6	6
(Israel) Chaim Arlozorov (Israel) Tom Frisher	0	0
(Canada) H Fritz (United States) M Grant	4	2
(Venezuela) J Andrew (Sweden) T Svensson	6	6
(South Africa) R Moore (South Africa) D Schneider	6	6
(Italy) F Meneschincheri (Italy) Roberto Meneschincheri	3	2
(United States) Tom Lee (Israel) Steve Rosenberg	1	0
3	(United Kingdom) J Feaver (South Africa) F McMillan	6	6
(Israel) S Glickstein (Austria) R Reininger	6	6
(Israel) S Perkiss (Israel) Eylon Sinai	3	4
(Italy) M Alciati (Italy) C Panatta	6	2	1
2	(United States) M Cahill (Australia) C Dibley	4	6	6

Quarterfinals
1	(Romania) I Năstase (Netherlands) T Okker	7	6
(Israel) S Puni (Israel) I Sher	5	4
4	(United Kingdom) R Drysdale (United Kingdom) R Lewis	4	6	3
(Venezuela) J Andrew (Sweden) T Svensson	6	3	6
(South Africa) R Moore (South Africa) D Schneider	4	1
3	(United Kingdom) J Feaver (South Africa) F McMillan	6	6
(Israel) S Glickstein (Austria) R Reininger	1	1
2	(United States) M Cahill (Australia) C Dibley	6	6

Semifinals
1	(Romania) I Năstase (Netherlands) T Okker	4	6	6
(Venezuela) J Andrew (Sweden) T Svensson	6	0	1
3	(United Kingdom) J Feaver (South Africa) F McMillan	4	6	3
2	(United States) M Cahill (Australia) C Dibley	6	3	6

Final
1	(Romania) I Năstase (Netherlands) T Okker	7	6
2	(United States) M Cahill (Australia) C Dibley	5	4
