= 1979 European Indoor Championships =

German tennis tournament

- Date: 29 October – 4 November
- Edition: 4th
- Category: Grand Prix
- Draw: 32S / 16D
- Prize money: $75,000
- Surface: Carpet / indoor
- Location: Cologne, West Germany

Champions

Singles
- (United States) Gene Mayer

Doubles
- (United States) Gene Mayer / (United States) Stan Smith
- Cologne Grand Prix

The 1979 European Indoor Championships, also known as the Cologne Grand Prix, was a men's tennis tournament played on indoor carpet courts in Cologne, West Germany that was part of the 1979 Colgate-Palmolive Grand Prix circuit. It was the fourth edition of the tournament and was held from 29 October through 4 November 1979. First-seeded Gene Mayer won the singles title.

== Finals ==
=== Singles ===
(United States) Gene Mayer defeated (Poland) Wojciech Fibak 6–3, 3–6, 6–1

- It was Mayer's 1st singles title of the year and the 2nd of his career.

=== Doubles ===
(United States) Gene Mayer / (United States) Stan Smith defeated (Switzerland) Heinz Günthardt / (Czechoslovakia) Pavel Složil 6–3, 6–4
