= 1979 Swiss Championships =

- Date: 9–15 July
- Edition: 34th
- Category: Grand Prix
- Draw: 64S / 32D
- Prize money: $75,000
- Surface: Clay / outdoor
- Location: Gstaad, Switzerland

Champions

Singles
- (West Germany) Ulrich Pinner

Doubles
- (Australia) Mark Edmondson / (Australia) John Marks
- Suisse Open Gstaad

The 1979 Swiss Championships was a men's tennis tournament played on outdoor clay courts in Gstaad, Switzerland. It was the 34th edition of the tournament and was held from 9 July until 15 July 1979. The tournament was part of the 1979 Grand Prix tennis circuit and offered total prize money of $75,000. Third-seeded Ulrich Pinner won the singles title.

== Finals ==
=== Singles ===
(West Germany) Ulrich Pinner defeated (Australia) Peter McNamara 6–2, 6–4, 7–5

- It was Pinner's 1st singles title of the year and the 2nd of his career.

=== Doubles ===
(Australia) Mark Edmondson / (Australia) John Marks defeated (Romania) Ion Țiriac / (Argentina) Guillermo Vilas 2–6, 6–1, 6–4
