= 1979 Tel Aviv Open =

- Date: October 8–13
- Edition: 1st
- Category: Grand Prix
- Draw: 32S / 16D
- Prize money: $50,000
- Surface: Hard / outdoor
- Location: Ramat HaSharon, Tel Aviv District, Israel
- Venue: Israel Tennis Centers

Champions

Singles
- (Netherlands) Tom Okker

Doubles
- (Romania) Ilie Năstase / (Netherlands) Tom Okker
- Tel Aviv Open

The 1979 Tel Aviv Open was a men's tennis tournament played on hard courts that was part of the 1979 Colgate-Palmolive Grand Prix. It was the inaugural edition of the tournament and was played at the Israel Tennis Centers in the Tel Aviv District city of Ramat HaSharon, Israel from October 8 through October 13, 1979. Second-seeded Tom Okker won the singles title.

== Finals ==
=== Singles ===
(Netherlands) Tom Okker defeated (Sweden) Per Hjertquist 6–4, 6–3

- It was Okker's 6th title of the year and the 87th of his career.

=== Doubles ===
(Romania) Ilie Năstase / (Netherlands) Tom Okker defeated (United States) Mike Cahill / (Australia) Colin Dibley 7–5, 6–4

- It was Nastase's 5th title of the year and the 98th of his career. It was Okker's 5th title of the year and the 86th of his career.
