= 1979 Tel Aviv Open – Singles =

Singles
- 1979 Tel Aviv Open

Final
- Champion: (Netherlands) Tom Okker
- Runner-up: (Sweden) Per Hjertquist
- Score: 6–4, 6–3

Details
- Draw: 32
- Seeds: 8

Events
Singles	Doubles
- Tel Aviv Open

This was the first edition of the Tel Aviv Open.

Tom Okker won the tournament, beating Per Hjertquist in the final, 6–4, 6–3.

== Seeds ==
1. (Romania) Ilie Năstase (second round)
2. (Netherlands) Tom Okker (champion)
3. (South Africa) David Schneider (quarterfinals)
4. (South Africa) Raymond Moore (second round)
5. (United States) Mike Cahill (second round)
6. (United States) Michael Grant (second round)
7. N/A
8. (Sweden) Per Hjertquist (final)

== Draw ==
Key

- Q = Qualifier
- WC = Wild card
- LL = Lucky loser
- Alt = Alternate
- ITF = ITF entry
- PR = Protected ranking
- SR = Special ranking
- SE = Special exempt
- JE = Junior exempt
- JR = Junior Accelerator Programme entrant
- CO = College Accelerator Programme entrant
- NG = Next Gen Accelerator Program entrant
- w/o = Walkover
- r = Retired
- d = Defaulted

=== Finals ===
Semifinals
(Australia) Colin Dibley	4	6	1
8	(Sweden) Per Hjertquist	6	2	6
(Sweden) Stefan Simonsson	4	2
2	(Netherlands) Tom Okker	6	6

Final
8	(Sweden) Per Hjertquist	4	3
2	(Netherlands) Tom Okker	6	6

=== Top half ===
First round
1	(Romania) I Năstase	6	6
Q	(Italy) Roberto Meneschincheri	1	1
(United States) C Leeds	0	1
(Australia) C Dibley	6	6
(Israel) Shai Puni	1	3
(United Kingdom) R Lewis	6	6
(Republic of Ireland) S Sorensen	7	4	4
6	(United States) M Grant	6	6	6
4	(South Africa) R Moore	6	6
Q	(United States) Tom Lee	1	4
(West Germany) A Maurer	1	6	6
Q	(Italy) A Panatta	6	2	4
(Canada) H Fritz	4	7	5
(South Africa) F McMillan	6	5	7
(Israel) Eylon Sinai	1	4
8	(Sweden) P Hjertquist	6	6

Second round
1	(Romania) I Năstase	6	5
(Australia) C Dibley	7	7
(United Kingdom) R Lewis	7	1	7
6	(United States) M Grant	6	6	5
4	(South Africa) R Moore	4	6	4
(West Germany) A Maurer	6	1	6
(South Africa) F McMillan	4	2
8	(Sweden) P Hjertquist	6	6

Quarterfinals
(Australia) C Dibley	5	6	6
(United Kingdom) R Lewis	7	1	2
(West Germany) A Maurer	3	6	2
8	(Sweden) P Hjertquist	6	3	6

Semifinals
(Australia) C Dibley	4	6	1
8	(Sweden) P Hjertquist	6	2	6

=== Bottom half ===
First round
5	(United States) M Cahill	2	6	7
(Austria) R Reininger	6	4	5
(New Zealand) O Parun	3	2
(Sweden) S Simonsson	6	6
(Venezuela) J Andrew	6	6
(Israel) Ilan Sher	0	0
(United Kingdom) R Drysdale	6	7	4
3	(South Africa) D Schneider	7	6	6
LL	(Italy) F Meneschincheri	5	7	1
(Israel) S Glickstein	7	6	6
(United Kingdom) J Feaver	6	6
(Israel) Tom Frisher	4	3
Q	(Italy) M Alciati	1	2
(Israel) Chaim Arlozorov	6	6
(Sweden) T Svensson	6	3	1
2	(Netherlands) T Okker	4	6	6

Second round
5	(United States) M Cahill	4	4
(Sweden) S Simonsson	6	6
(Venezuela) J Andrew	6	3	6
3	(South Africa) D Schneider	3	6	7
(Israel) S Glickstein	4	6	6
(United Kingdom) J Feaver	6	0	3
(Israel) Chaim Arlozorov	2	2
2	(Netherlands) T Okker	6	6

Quarterfinals
(Sweden) S Simonsson	7	6
3	(South Africa) D Schneider	6	2
(Israel) S Glickstein	5	7	6
2	(Netherlands) T Okker	7	6	7

Semifinals
(Sweden) S Simonsson	4	2
2	(Netherlands) T Okker	6	6
