= 1979 New Orleans Tennis Festival =

Tennis tournament

- Date: March 19–25
- Edition: 2nd
- Category: Grand Prix (WCT)
- Draw: 32S / 16D
- Prize money: $175,000
- Surface: Carpet / indoor
- Location: New Orleans, Louisiana, U.S.
- Venue: New Orleans Municipal Auditorium

Champions

Singles
- (United States) John McEnroe

Doubles
- (United States) Peter Fleming / (United States) John McEnroe
- New Orleans Grand Prix

The 1979 New Orleans Tennis Festival was a men's tennis tournament played on indoor carpet courts at the New Orleans Municipal Auditorium in New Orleans, Louisiana in the United States that was part of the World Championship Tennis series of the 1979 Colgate-Palmolive Grand Prix. It was the second edition of the tournament and was held from March 25 through March 25, 1979. Third-seeded John McEnroe won the singles title and earned $30,200 first-prize money.

== Finals ==
=== Singles ===
(United States) John McEnroe defeated (United States) Roscoe Tanner 6–4, 6–2

- It was McEnroe's 2nd singles title of the year and the 6th of his career.

=== Doubles ===
(United States) Peter Fleming / (United States) John McEnroe defeated (United States) Bob Lutz / (United States) Stan Smith 6–1, 6–3

- It was Fleming's 2nd doubles title of the year and the 8th of his career. It was McEnroe's 3rd doubles title of the year and the 10th of his career.

== See also ==
- Borg–McEnroe rivalry
