= 1979 United Bank Classic =

- Date: February 19–25
- Edition: 8th
- Category: Grand Prix
- Draw: 32S / 16D
- Prize money: $125,000
- Surface: Carpet / indoor
- Location: Denver, Colorado, U.S.

Champions

Singles
- (Poland) Wojciech Fibak

Doubles
- (United States) Stan Smith / (United States) Bob Lutz
- Denver Open

The 1979 United Bank Classic, also known as the Denver WCT, was a men's tennis tournament played on indoor carpet courts in Denver, Colorado in the United States that was part of the 1979 Grand Prix circuit. It was the eighth edition of the tournament and took place from February 19 through February 25, 1979. Sixth-seeded Wojciech Fibak won the singles competition.

== Finals ==
=== Singles ===
(Poland) Wojciech Fibak defeated (United States) Victor Amaya 6–4, 6–1

- It was Fibak's 1st singles title of the year and the 7th of his career.

=== Doubles ===
(United States) Stan Smith / (United States) Bob Lutz defeated (Poland) Wojciech Fibak / (Netherlands) Tom Okker 7–6, 6–3
