= 1979 Lagos Classic =

Tennis tournament

- Date: 26 February – 4 March
- Edition: 3rd
- Category: Grand Prix (WCT)
- Draw: 32S / 16D
- Prize money: $50,000
- Surface: Hard / outdoor
- Location: Lagos, Nigeria
- Venue: Lagos Lawn Tennis Club

Champions

Singles
- (Austria) Hans Kary

Doubles
- (United States) Bruce Kleege / (United States) Joel Bailey
- Lagos Open

The 1979 Lagos Classic was a men's tennis tournament played on outdoor hard courts at the Lagos Lawn Tennis Club in Lagos, Nigeria. The event was part of the World Championship Tennis tier of the 1979 Grand Prix circuit. It was the third edition of the tournament and was held from 26 February until 4 March 1979. Unseeded Hans Kary won the singles title.

== Finals ==
=== Singles ===
(Austria) Hans Kary defeated (Austria) Peter Feigl, 6–4, 3–6, 6–2

- It was Kary's only singles title of his career.

=== Doubles ===
(United States) Bruce Kleege / (United States) Joel Bailey defeated (Egypt) Ismail El Shafei / (Austria) Peter Feigl 6–4, 6–7, 6–3
