= 1979 Ramazzotti Cup =

- Date: 26 March – 1 April
- Edition: 2nd
- Category: Grand Prix (WCT)
- Draw: 32S / 16D
- Prize money: $200,000
- Surface: Carpet / indoor
- Location: Milan, Italy
- Venue: Palazzo dello Sport

Champions

Singles
- (United States) John McEnroe

Doubles
- (United States) Peter Fleming / (United States) John McEnroe
- Milan Indoor

The 1979 Ramazzotti Cup, also known as the Milan Indoor or Milan WCT, was a men's tennis tournament played on indoor carpet courts at the Palazzo dello Sport in Milan, Italy. The event was part WCT Tour which was incorporated into the 1979 Colgate-Palmolive Grand Prix circuit. It was the second edition of the tournament and was held from 26 March through 1 April 1979. Third-seeded John McEnroe won the singles title and earned $35,000 first-prize money.

== Finals ==
=== Singles ===
(United States) John McEnroe defeated (Australia) John Alexander 6–4, 6–3

- It was McEnroe's 2nd singles title of the year and the 7th of his career.

=== Doubles ===
(United States) Peter Fleming / (United States) John McEnroe defeated (Argentina) José Luis Clerc / (Czechoslovakia) Tomáš Šmíd 6–1, 6–3
