= 1979 Torneo Godó =

- Date: 8–14 October
- Edition: 27th
- Category: Grand Prix circuit
- Draw: 64S / 32D
- Prize money: $175,000
- Surface: Clay / outdoor
- Location: Barcelona, Catalonia, Spain
- Venue: Real Club de Tenis Barcelona

Champions

Singles
- (Chile) Hans Gildemeister

Doubles
- (Italy) Paolo Bertolucci / (Italy) Adriano Panatta
- Torneo Godó

The 1979 Torneo Godó or Trofeo Conde de Godó was a men's tennis tournament that took place on outdoor clay courts at the Real Club de Tenis Barcelona in Barcelona, Catalonia in Spain. It was the 27th edition of the tournament and was part of the 1979 Grand Prix circuit. It was held from 8 October until 14 October 1979. Ninth-seeded Hans Gildemeister won the singles title.

== Finals ==
=== Singles ===
(Chile) Hans Gildemeister defeated (United States) Eddie Dibbs 6–4, 6–3, 6–1

- It was Gildemeister's first singles title of his career.

=== Doubles ===
(Italy) 'Paolo Bertolucci / (Chile) Adriano Panatta defeated (Brazil) Carlos Kirmayr / (Brazil) Cássio Motta 6–4, 6–3
