= 1979 Baltimore International =

- Date: January 15–21
- Edition: 8th
- Category: Grand Prix
- Draw: 32S / 16D
- Prize money: $75,000
- Surface: Carpet / indoor
- Location: Baltimore, MD, U.S.
- Venue: Towson State College

Champions

Singles
- (United States) Harold Solomon

Doubles
- (United States) Marty Riessen / (United States) Sherwood Stewart
- Baltimore International

The 1979 Baltimore International, also known by its sponsored name First National Classic, was a men's tennis tournament played on indoor carpet courts at the Towson State College in Baltimore, Maryland in the United States that was part of the 1979 Grand Prix circuit. It was the eighth edition of the event and was held from January 15 through January 21, 1979. First-seeded Harold Solomon won the singles title and earned $13,000 first-prize money.

== Finals ==
=== Singles ===
(United States) Harold Solomon defeated (United States) Marty Riessen 7–5, 6–4

- It was Solomon's 1st singles title of the year and the 16th of his career.

=== Doubles ===
(United States) Marty Riessen / (United States) Sherwood Stewart defeated (India) Anand Amritraj / (South Africa) Cliff Drysdale 7–6, 6–4
