= 1979 South American Open =

- Date: 19–25 November
- Edition: 13th
- Category: Grand Prix
- Draw: 32S / 16D
- Prize money: $175,000
- Surface: Clay / outdoor
- Location: Buenos Aires, Argentina

Champions

Singles
- (Argentina) Guillermo Vilas

Doubles
- (Czechoslovakia) Tomáš Šmíd / (United States) Sherwood Stewart
- South American Open

The 1979 South American Open also known as the ATP Buenos Aires was a men's Grand Prix tennis circuit tournament held in Buenos Aires, Argentina that was played on outdoor clay courts. It was the 13th edition of the tournament and was held from 19 November through 25 November 1979. First-seeded Guillermo Vilas won the singles title.

== Finals ==
=== Singles ===
(Argentina) Guillermo Vilas defeated (Argentina) José Luis Clerc 6–1, 6–2, 6–2

- It was Vilas's 3rd singles title of the year and the 45th of his career.

=== Doubles ===
(Czechoslovakia) Tomáš Šmíd / (United States) Sherwood Stewart defeated (Brazil) Marcos Hocevar / (Brazil) João Soares 6–1, 7–5

- It was Smid's 4th title of the year and the 7th of his career. It was Stewart's 10th title of the year and the 30th of his career.
