= 1979 Washington Star International =

Tennis tournament

- Date: July 16–22
- Edition: 11th
- Category: Grand Prix
- Draw: 64S / 32D
- Prize money: $175,000
- Surface: Clay / outdoor
- Location: Washington, D.C., United States
- Venue: Rock Creek Park

Champions

Singles
- (Argentina) Guillermo Vilas

Doubles
- (United States) Marty Riessen / (United States) Sherwood Stewart
- Washington Open

The 1979 Washington Star International was a men's tennis tournament and was played on outdoor clay courts. The event was part of the 1979 Grand Prix circuit. It was the 11th edition of the tournament and was held at Rock Creek Park in Washington, D.C. from July 16 through July 22, 1979. First-seeded Guillermo Vilas won the singles title, his third at the event after 1975 and 1977.

== Finals ==
=== Singles ===
(Argentina) Guillermo Vilas defeated (Paraguay) Víctor Pecci, Sr. 7–6^{(7–4)}, 7–6^{(7–3)}

- It was Vilas' 2nd singles title of the year and the 44th of his career.

=== Doubles ===
(United States) Marty Riessen / (United States) Sherwood Stewart defeated (United States) Brian Gottfried / (Mexico) Raúl Ramírez 2–6, 6–3, 6–4
