= 1979 Louisville Open =

- Date: July 23–30
- Edition: 10th
- Category: Grand Prix
- Draw: 64S / 32D
- Prize money: $175,000
- Surface: Clay / outdoor
- Location: Louisville, Kentucky, U.S.
- Venue: Louisville Tennis Center

Champions

Singles
- (Australia) John Alexander

Doubles
- (United States) Sherwood Stewart (United States) Marty Riessen
- Louisville Open

The 1979 Louisville Open, also known as the Louisville International Classic, was a men's tennis tournament played on outdoor clay courts at the Louisville Tennis Center in Louisville, Kentucky, United States. It was the tenth and final edition of the tournament and was scheduled from Monday, July 23 through Sunday, July 29, 1979, but due to intermittent rain throughout the week it ended one day late. Some matches were played on indoor clay courts. The tournament was part of the Grand Prix tennis circuit. The singles final was won by seventh-seeded John Alexander, last year's runner-up, who received $25,000 first prize money and earned 175 ranking points.

== Finals ==
=== Singles ===
(Australia) John Alexander defeated (United States) Terry Moor 7–6, 6–7, 3–3, ret.

- It was Alexander's 1st singles title of the year and the 4th of his career.

=== Doubles ===
(United States) Sherwood Stewart / (United States) Marty Riessen defeated (India) Vijay Amritraj / (Mexico) Raúl Ramírez 6–2, 1–6, 6–1
