= 1979 Ramazzotti Cup – Doubles =

Doubles
- 1979 Ramazzotti Cup

Final
- Champion: (United States) Peter Fleming (United States) John McEnroe
- Runner-up: (Argentina) José Luis Clerc (Czechoslovakia) Tomáš Šmíd
- Score: 6–1, 6–3

Details
- Draw: 16
- Seeds: 4

Events
Singles	Doubles
- Milan Indoor

The 1979 Ramazzotti Cup – Doubles was an event of the 1979 Ramazzotti Cup tennis tournament and was played on indoor carpet courts at the Palazzo dello Sport in Milan, Italy, between 26 March and 1 April 1979. The draw consisted of 16 teams and four of them were seeded. José Higueras and Víctor Pecci were the defending Milan Indoor doubles champions but did not compete together in this edition. The first-seeded team of Peter Fleming and John McEnroe won the doubles title after a win in the final against unseeded pairing José Luis Clerc and Tomáš Šmíd, 6–1, 6–3.

== Seeds ==
1. (United States) Peter Fleming / (United States) John McEnroe (champions)
2. (Paraguay) Víctor Pecci / (Hungary) Balázs Taróczy (semifinals)
3. (Romania) Ilie Năstase / (Mexico) Raúl Ramírez (first round)
4. (Australia) John Alexander / (Australia) Geoff Masters (first round)

== Draw ==
Key

- Q = Qualifier
- WC = Wild card
- LL = Lucky loser
- Alt = Alternate
- ITF = ITF entry
- PR = Protected ranking
- SR = Special ranking
- SE = Special exempt
- JE = Junior exempt
- JR = Junior Accelerator Programme entrant
- CO = College Accelerator Programme entrant
- NG = Next Gen Accelerator Program entrant
- w/o = Walkover
- r = Retired
- d = Defaulted

First Round
1	(United States) Peter Fleming (United States) John McEnroe	6	6
(Spain) Ángel Giménez (Italy) Gianni Ocleppo	2	1
(United States) Pat DuPré (United States) Gene Mayer	6	6
(United States) Mike Barr (United States) Jon Molin	1	2
3	(Romania) Ilie Năstase (Mexico) Raúl Ramírez	5	7	6
(Italy) Paolo Bertolucci (Italy) Adriano Panatta	7	6	7
(Austria) Peter Feigl (Austria) Hans Kary	1	3
(Socialist Federal Republic of Yugoslavia) Željko Franulović (Zimbabwe) Andrew Pattison	6	6
(Italy) Corrado Barazzutti (Italy) Tonino Zugarelli	3	6	4
(United States) Johan Kriek (United Kingdom) Buster Mottram	6	4	6
(Argentina) José Luis Clerc (Czechoslovakia) Tomáš Šmíd	6	6
4	(Australia) John Alexander (Australia) Geoff Masters	2	4
(Australia) Dick Crealy (Egypt) Ismail El Shafei	6	6
(South Africa) Deon Joubert (United Kingdom) Andrew Jarrett	2	2
(Italy) Gianni Marchetti (Italy) Enzo Vattuone	0	0
2	(Paraguay) Víctor Pecci (Hungary) Balázs Taróczy	6	6

Quarterfinals
1	(United States) Peter Fleming (United States) John McEnroe	6	7
(United States) Pat DuPré (United States) Gene Mayer	2	6
(Italy) Paolo Bertolucci (Italy) Adriano Panatta	6	6
(Socialist Federal Republic of Yugoslavia) Željko Franulović (Zimbabwe) Andrew Pattison	2	4
(United States) Johan Kriek (United Kingdom) Buster Mottram	1	4
(Argentina) José Luis Clerc (Czechoslovakia) Tomáš Šmíd	6	6
(Australia) Dick Crealy (Egypt) Ismail El Shafei	3	7	5
2	(Paraguay) Víctor Pecci (Hungary) Balázs Taróczy	6	5	7

Semifinals
1	(United States) Peter Fleming (United States) John McEnroe	6	6
(Italy) Paolo Bertolucci (Italy) Adriano Panatta	3	2
(Argentina) José Luis Clerc (Czechoslovakia) Tomáš Šmíd	6	6
2	(Paraguay) Víctor Pecci (Hungary) Balázs Taróczy	4	1

Final
1	(United States) Peter Fleming (United States) John McEnroe	6	6
(Argentina) José Luis Clerc (Czechoslovakia) Tomáš Šmíd	1	3
