= 1979 Ramazzotti Cup – Singles =

Singles
- 1979 Ramazzotti Cup

Final
- Champion: (United States) John McEnroe
- Runner-up: (Australia) John Alexander
- Score: 6–4, 6–3

Details
- Draw: 32
- Seeds: 8

Events
Singles	Doubles
- Milan Indoor

The 1979 Ramazzotti Cup – Singles was an event of the 1979 Ramazzotti Cup tennis tournament and was played on indoor carpet courts at the Palazzo dello Sport in Milan, Italy, between 26 March and 1 April 1979. The draw comprised 32 players and eight of them were seeded. First-seeded Björn Borg was the defending Milan Indoor singles champion but lost in the quarterfinals to John Alexander. Third-seeded John McEnroe won the singles title after a win in the final against unseeded John Alexander, 6–4, 6–3.

== Seeds ==
1. (Sweden) Björn Borg (quarterfinals)
2. (United States) Vitas Gerulaitis (semifinals)
3. (United States) John McEnroe (champion)
4. (Mexico) Raúl Ramírez (first round)
5. (Italy) Corrado Barazzutti (first round)
6. (Romania) Ilie Năstase (second round)
7. (Argentina) José Luis Clerc (second round)
8. (Hungary) Balázs Taróczy (second round)

== Draw ==
Key

- Q = Qualifier
- WC = Wild card
- LL = Lucky loser
- Alt = Alternate
- ITF = ITF entry
- PR = Protected ranking
- SR = Special ranking
- SE = Special exempt
- JE = Junior exempt
- JR = Junior Accelerator Programme entrant
- CO = College Accelerator Programme entrant
- NG = Next Gen Accelerator Program entrant
- w/o = Walkover
- r = Retired
- d = Defaulted

=== Finals ===
Semifinals
(Australia) John Alexander	6	6
(Italy) Adriano Panatta	3	4
3	(United States) John McEnroe	6	6
2	(United States) Vitas Gerulaitis	0	3

Final
(Australia) John Alexander	4	3
3	(United States) John McEnroe	6	6

=== Top half ===
First Round
1	(Sweden) Björn Borg	6	6
(Australia) Geoff Masters	1	2
(Austria) Peter Feigl	6	4	4
(Italy) Tonino Zugarelli	3	6	6
(Italy) Gianni Ocleppo	6	6
(Italy) Paolo Bertolucci	1	4
(Australia) John Alexander	6	3	7
5	(Italy) Corrado Barazzutti	3	6	5
4	(Mexico) Raúl Ramírez	5	4
(United States) Gene Mayer	7	6
(Spain) Ángel Giménez	6	4	6
(Italy) Franco Merlone	2	6	7
(Italy) Adriano Panatta	7	6
(Egypt) Ismail El Shafei	6	2
(Austria) Hans Kary	5	2
7	(Argentina) José Luis Clerc	7	6

Second Round
1	(Sweden) Björn Borg	6	6
(Italy) Tonino Zugarelli	3	1
(Italy) Gianni Ocleppo	2	3
(Australia) John Alexander	6	6
(United States) Gene Mayer	6	6
(Italy) Franco Merlone	4	1
(Italy) Adriano Panatta	6	7
7	(Argentina) José Luis Clerc	2	6

Quarterfinals
1	(Sweden) Björn Borg	3	6	4
(Australia) John Alexander	6	3	6
(United States) Gene Mayer	3	6	5
(Italy) Adriano Panatta	6	3	7

Semifinals
(Australia) John Alexander	6	6
(Italy) Adriano Panatta	3	4

=== Bottom half ===
First Round
6	(Romania) Ilie Năstase	7	6
(United States) Johan Kriek	5	4
(South Africa) Deon Joubert	6	4	5
(Zimbabwe) Andrew Pattison	2	6	7
(United Kingdom) Buster Mottram	6	6
(Paraguay) Víctor Pecci	2	4
(United Kingdom) Andrew Jarrett	6	1	2
3	(United States) John McEnroe	4	6	6
8	(Hungary) Balázs Taróczy	6	6
(United States) Pat DuPré	3	1
Q	(Australia) Dick Crealy	3	3
(Czechoslovakia) Tomáš Šmíd	6	6
Q	(Italy) Massimo Rivaroli	3	3
(United States) Peter Fleming	6	6
(Socialist Federal Republic of Yugoslavia) Željko Franulović	7	3	2
2	(United States) Vitas Gerulaitis	6	6	6

Second Round
6	(Romania) Ilie Năstase	7	4	3
(Zimbabwe) Andrew Pattison	5	6	6
(United Kingdom) Buster Mottram	4	4
3	(United States) John McEnroe	6	6
8	(Hungary) Balázs Taróczy	0	6	1
(Czechoslovakia) Tomáš Šmíd	6	0	6
(United States) Peter Fleming	6	6	3
2	(United States) Vitas Gerulaitis	2	7	6

Quarterfinals
(Zimbabwe) Andrew Pattison	1	3
3	(United States) John McEnroe	6	6
(Czechoslovakia) Tomáš Šmíd	3	2
2	(United States) Vitas Gerulaitis	6	6

Semifinals
3	(United States) John McEnroe	6	6
2	(United States) Vitas Gerulaitis	0	3
