= 1979 South American Open – Singles =

Tennis tournament

Singles
- 1979 ATP Buenos Aires

Final
- Champion: (Argentina) Guillermo Vilas
- Runner-up: (Argentina) José Luis Clerc
- Score: 6–1, 6–2, 6–1

Details
- Draw: 32
- Seeds: 8

Events
Singles	Doubles
- ATP Buenos Aires

Guillermo Vilas defeated José Luis Clerc 6–1, 6–2, 6–1 to win the 1979 ATP Buenos Aires singles competition. José Luis Clerc was the defending champion.

== Seeds ==
A champion seed is indicated in bold text while text in italics indicates the round in which that seed was eliminated.

1. (Argentina) Guillermo Vilas **(champion)**
2. (Spain) José Higueras (quarterfinals)
3. (Paraguay) Víctor Pecci, Sr. (first round)
4. (United States) Eddie Dibbs (semifinals)
5. (Chile) Hans Gildemeister (second round)
6. (Argentina) José Luis Clerc (final)
7. (Czechoslovakia) Ivan Lendl (semifinals)
8. (Czechoslovakia) Tomáš Šmíd (quarterfinals)

== Draw ==
=== Key ===
- Q - Qualifier
- NB: All rounds up to but not including the final were the best of 3 sets. The final was the best of 5 sets.

=== Final ===
Final
1	(Argentina) **Guillermo Vilas**	**6**	**6**	**6**
6	(Argentina) José Luis Clerc	1	2	1

=== Section 1 ===
First round
1	(Argentina) **G Vilas**	**6**	**6**
(Chile) B Prajoux	3	4
(Australia) P Kronk	2	6
(Argentina) **C Gattiker**	**6**	**7**
(Spain) F Luna	2	4
(New Zealand) **C Lewis**	**6**	**6**
Q	(Spain) Á Giménez	2	2
8	(Czechoslovakia) **T Šmíd**	**6**	**6**
4	(United States) **E Dibbs**	5	**6**	**6**
(Argentina) R Cano	**7**	1	2
(Brazil) **C Kirmayr**	**6**	**7**
(United States) R Fagel	2	5
Q	(Chile) P Rebolledo	3	4
(Hungary) **B Taróczy**	**6**	**6**
(United States) C Owens	**7**	2	3
5	(Chile) **H Gildemeister**	6	**6**	**6**

Second round
1	(Argentina) **G Vilas**	**7**	**7**
(Argentina) C Gattiker	5	6
(New Zealand) C Lewis	1	4
8	(Czechoslovakia) **T Šmíd**	**6**	**6**
4	(United States) **E Dibbs**	**6**	**6**
(Brazil) C Kirmayr	2	3
(Hungary) **B Taróczy**	**6**	**6**
5	(Chile) H Gildemeister	1	2

Quarterfinals
1	(Argentina) **G Vilas**	**6**	**6**
8	(Czechoslovakia) T Šmíd	1	2
4	(United States) **E Dibbs**	**6**	**6**
(Hungary) B Taróczy	4	4

Semifinals
1	(Argentina) **G Vilas**	**6**	**6**
4	(United States) E Dibbs	1	1

=== Section 2 ===
First round
6	(Argentina) **J-L Clerc**	**6**	**6**
(Colombia) J Velasco, Sr.	2	4
(West Germany) **R Gehring**	**6**	**6**
(Brazil) T Koch	1	1
(United States) **T Moor**	**6**	**6**
Q	(Argentina) A Gattiker	1	1
(Australia) **P McNamara**	**6**	**6**
3	(Paraguay) V Pecci, Sr.	3	4
7	(Czechoslovakia) **I Lendl**	**6**	**6**
Q	(Argentina) R Argüello	3	2
(Chile) **A Pierola**	**6**	**6**
(Australia) R Frawley	1	3
(Argentina) F Dalla Fontana	**6**	2	6
(Ecuador) **A Gómez**	3	**6**	**8**
(Brazil) C Motta	1	3
2	(Spain) **J Higueras**	**6**	**6**

Second round
6	(Argentina) **J-L Clerc**	**6**	**6**
(West Germany) R Gehring	2	2
(United States) **T Moor**	6	**6**	**8**
(Australia) P McNamara	**7**	4	6
7	(Czechoslovakia) **I Lendl**	6	**7**	**6**
(Chile) A Pierola	**7**	5	4
(Ecuador) A Gómez	3	3
2	(Spain) **J Higueras**	**6**	**6**

Quarterfinals
6	(Argentina) **J-L Clerc**	**6**	**6**
(United States) T Moor	4	1
7	(Czechoslovakia) **I Lendl**	**6**	**6**
2	(Spain) J Higueras	2	2

Semifinals
6	(Argentina) **J-L Clerc**	**6**	3	**6**
7	(Czechoslovakia) I Lendl	3	**6**	4
