= Marco Alciati =

Italian tennis player

- Country (sports): Italy
- Born: September 19, 1960 (age 64); Rome, Italy

Singles
- Career record: 3–8
- Career titles: 0
- Highest ranking: No. 274 (22 December 1980)

Doubles
- Career record: 2–15
- Career titles: 0
- Highest ranking: No. 187 (10 September 1984)
Medal record
Mediterranean Games
Gold medal – first place	1979 Split	Doubles
- Last updated on: April 25, 2019.

Marco Alciati (born September 19, 1960) is an Italian retired professional tennis player who won a gold medal at the 1979 Mediterranean Games.

== ATP Challenger Tour career finals ==
=== Doubles: 1 (0–1) ===
Result	No.	Date	Tournament	Surface	Partner	Opponents	Score
Loss	1.	1981	San Benedetto Challenger, Italy	Clay	(United States) Mike Barr	(Italy) Paolo Bertolucci (Italy) Adriano Panatta	4–6, 3–6
