= Jimmy Connors career statistics =

This is a list of the main career statistics of former tennis player Jimmy Connors.

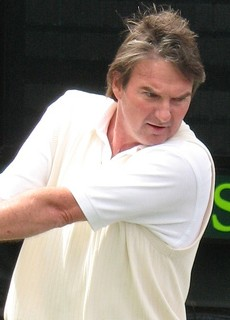
Jimmy Connors spent a total of 268 weeks at number 1, including 160 consecutive weeks.

== Grand Slam tournament finals ==
=== Singles: 15 finals (8 titles, 7 runner-ups) ===
Result	Year	Championship	Surface	Opponent	Score
Win	1974	Australian Open	Grass	(Australia) Phil Dent	7–6^{(9–7)}, 6–4, 4–6, 6–3
Win	1974	Wimbledon	Grass	(Australia) Ken Rosewall	6–1, 6–1, 6–4
Win	1974	US Open	Grass	(Australia) Ken Rosewall	6–1, 6–0, 6–1
Loss	1975	Australian Open	Grass	(Australia) John Newcombe	5–7, 6–3, 4–6, 6–7^{(7–9)}
Loss	1975	Wimbledon	Grass	(United States) Arthur Ashe	1–6, 1–6, 7–5, 4–6
Loss	1975	US Open	Clay	(Spain) Manuel Orantes	4–6, 3–6, 3–6
Win	1976	US Open (2)	Clay	(Sweden) Björn Borg	6–4, 3–6, 7–6^{(11–9)}, 6–4
Loss	1977	Wimbledon	Grass	(Sweden) Björn Borg	6–3, 2–6, 1–6, 7–5, 4–6
Loss	1977	US Open	Clay	(Argentina) Guillermo Vilas	6–2, 3–6, 6–7^{(4–7)}, 0–6
Loss	1978	Wimbledon	Grass	(Sweden) Björn Borg	2–6, 2–6, 3–6
Win	1978	US Open (3)	Hard	(Sweden) Björn Borg	6–4, 6–2, 6–2
Win	1982	Wimbledon (2)	Grass	(United States) John McEnroe	3–6, 6–3, 6–7^{(2–7)}, 7–6^{(7–5)}, 6–4
Win	1982	US Open (4)	Hard	(Czechoslovakia) Ivan Lendl	6–3, 6–2, 4–6, 6–4
Win	1983	US Open (5)	Hard	(Czechoslovakia) Ivan Lendl	6–3, 6–7^{(2–7)}, 7–5, 6–0
Loss	1984	Wimbledon	Grass	(United States) John McEnroe	1–6, 1–6, 2–6

=== Doubles: 3 (2 titles, 1 runner-up) ===
Result	Year	Championship	Surface	Partner	Opponents	Score
Loss	1973	French Open	Clay	(Romania) Ilie Năstase	(Australia) John Newcombe (Netherlands) Tom Okker	1–6, 6–3, 3–6, 7–5, 4–6
Win	1973	Wimbledon	Grass	(Romania) Ilie Năstase	(Australia) John Cooper (Australia) Neale Fraser	3–6, 6–3, 6–4, 8–9^{(3)}, 6–1
Win	1975	US Open	Clay	(Romania) Ilie Năstase	(Netherlands) Tom Okker (United States) Marty Riessen	6–4, 7–6

=== Mixed doubles: 1 (1 runner-up) ===
Result	Year	Championship	Surface	Partner	Opponents	Score
Loss	1974	US Open	Grass	(United States) Chris Evert	(United States) Pam Teeguarden (Australia) Geoff Masters	1–6, 6–7

== Grand Prix year-end championships finals ==
=== Singles: 1 (1 title) ===
Result	Year	Tournament	Surface	Opponent	Score
Win	1977	Grand Prix Masters	Carpet (i)	(Sweden) Björn Borg	6–4, 1–6, 6–4

== WCT year-end championship finals ==
=== Singles: 3 (2 titles, 1 runner-up) ===
Result	Year	Tournament	Surface	Opponent	Score
Win	1977	WCT Finals	Carpet (i)	(United States) Dick Stockton	6–7^{(5–7)}, 6–1, 6–4, 6–3
Win	1980	WCT Finals	Carpet (i)	(United States) John McEnroe	2–6, 7–6^{(7–4)}, 6–1, 6–2
Loss	1984	WCT Finals	Carpet (i)	(United States) John McEnroe	1–6, 2–6, 3–6

== ATP Tour singles timeline ==
Key
W	F	SF	QF	#R	RR	Q#	DNQ	A	NH

(W) winner; (F) finalist; (SF) semifinalist; (QF) quarterfinalist; (#R) rounds 4, 3, 2, 1; (RR) round-robin stage; (Q#) qualification round; (DNQ) did not qualify; (A) absent; (NH) not held; (SR) strike rate (events won / competed); (W–L) win–loss record.

Qualifying matches and walkovers are neither official match wins nor losses.

Tournament	1969	1970	1971	1972	1973	1974	1975	1976	1977	1978	1979	1980	1981	1982	1983	1984	1985	1986	1987	1988	1989	1990	1991	1992	1993	1994	1995	1996	SR	W–L	Win %
Grand Slam tournaments
Australian Open	A	A	A	A	A	W	F	A	A	A	A	A	A	A	A	A	A	NH	A	A	A	A	A	A	A	A	A	A	1 / 2	11–1	92%
French Open	A	A	A	3R	1R	A	A	A	A	A	SF	SF	QF	QF	QF	SF	SF	A	QF	A	2R	A	3R	1R	A	A	A	A	0 / 13	40–13	75%
Wimbledon	A	A	A	QF	QF	W	F	QF	F	F	SF	SF	SF	W	4R	F	SF	1R	SF	4R	2R	A	3R	1R	A	A	A	A	2 / 20	84–18	82%
US Open	LQ	1R	2R	1R	QF	W	F	W	F	W	SF	SF	SF	W	W	SF	SF	3R	SF	QF	QF	A	SF	2R	A	A	A	A	5 / 22	98–17	85%
Win–loss	0–0	0–1	1–1	5–3	8–3	20–0	17–3	11–1	12–2	13–1	15–3	15–3	14–3	18–1	14–2	16–3	15–3	2–2	14–3	7–2	6–3	0–0	9–3	1–3	0–0	0–0	0–0	0–0	8 / 57	233–49	83%
Year-end championships
Grand Prix	NH	DNQ	DNQ	SF	SF	A	A	A	W	RR	SF	SF	RR	SF	SF	SF	A	DNQ	RR	A	DNQ	DNQ	DNQ	DNQ	DNQ	DNQ	DNQ	DNQ	1 / 11	18–17	51%
WCT Finals	NH		A	A	A	A	A	A	W	A	SF	W	A	A	A	F	SF	A	A	A	A	Not Held							2 / 5	10–3	77%
Team tournaments
Davis Cup	A	A	A	A	A	A	A	P	A	A	A	A	W	A	A	F	A	A	A	A	A	A	A	A	A	A	A	A	1 / 3	10–3	77%
Notable tournaments (Grand Prix / WCT)																						(ATP Tour)									
Philadelphia	A	A	A	A	A	A	A	W	F	W	W	W	QF	F	A	A	SF	QF	QF	A	A	A	A	A	A	1R	A	A	4 / 11	40–7	85%
Memphis	Not Held						A	A	A	W	W	F	A	A	W	W	SF	QF	F	A	QF	A	A	SF	A	A	A	A	4 / 10	38–6	86%
Indian Wells	Not Held					A	A	W	A	A	QF	SF (Note: Tournament abandoned at Semi-finals stage due to rain.)	W	A	2R	W	QF	SF	A	A	SF	A	A	2R	A	A	A	A	3 / 10	34–6	85%
Miami	Not Held																A	SF	SF	F	4R	A	2R	3R	1R	A	A	A	0 / 7	21–7	75%
Las Vegas	Not Held			A	A	A	A	W	W	2R	F	A	A	W	W	NH	1R	Not Held											4 / 7	25–3	89%
Monte-Carlo	A	A	A	A	A	A	A	A	A	A	A	2R	F (Note: Final unfinished due to rain. Guillermo Vilas and Jimmy Connors both received Runners-up finishes.)	A	A	A	A	A	A	A	2R	A	A	A	A	A	A	A	0 / 3	5–2	71%
Hamburg	A	A	A	A	A	A	A	A	A	A	A	A	F	QF	A	A	A	A	A	A	QF	A	A	A	A	A	A	A	0 / 3	10–3	77%
Rome	A	A	A	2R	2R	A	A	A	A	A	A	A	A	A	A	A	A	A	A	A	3R	A	A	A	A	A	A	A	0 / 3	3–3	50%
Washington	A	A	1R	A	A	A	A	W	A	W	A	3R	A	A	A	A	SF	A	SF	W	A	A	A	A	A	A	A	A	3 / 7	25–4	86%
Indianapolis (Note: Held as the U.S. Men's Clay Court Championships on clay from 1969 to 1987, then as the Indianapolis Tennis Championships on hard from 1988 onwards.)	A	A	2R	F	3R	W	A	W	F	W	W	A	A	A	A	A	A	A	A	3R	A	A	A	QF	A	A	A	A	4 / 10	41–6	87%
Canada	A	A	A	A	A	3R	A	A	A	A	A	A	1R	SF	SF	SF	SF	A	SF	SF	A	A	A	A	A	A	A	A	0 / 8	21–7	75%
Cincinnati	A	A	2R	W	SF	A	A	A	A	A	A	SF	3R	SF	SF	SF	A	F	SF	3R	A	A	A	A	A	A	A	A	1 / 11	39–9	81%
Los Angeles	A	3R	F	3R	W	W	A	QF	A	A	A	A	A	A	SF	W	A	A	A	A	A	A	A	QF	A	A	1R	A	3 / 10	34–7	83%
Tokyo Indoor	Not Held									2R	F	W	A	A	SF	W	SF	SF	2R	A	A	A	A	A	A	A	A	NH	2 / 8	25–4	86%
Stockholm	A	A	A	2R	SF	A	F	SF	A	A	A	A	SF	A	A	SF	A	A	A	A	A	A	2R	A	A	A	A	A	0 / 7	21–7	75%
Career statistics
	1969	1970	1971	1972	1973	1974	1975	1976	1977	1978	1979	1980	1981	1982	1983	1984	1985	1986	1987	1988	1989	1990	1991	1992	1993	1994	1995	1996	SR	W–L	Win%
Tournaments	1	4	13	30	26	21	19	25	23	17	20	21	16	18	15	18	15	15	17	13	15	3	14	16	5	3	2	1	406		
Titles–finals	0-0	0–0	0–2	6–9	11–14	15–17	9–15	12–15	8–15	10–12	8–12	6–8	4–6	7–11	4–5	5–8	0–2	0–4	0–3	2–4	2–2	0–0	0–0	0–0	0–0	0–0	0–0	0–0	109-164	109–55	66%
Overall W–L	0-1	5–4	20–11	69–24	88–15	93–4	82–8	90–8	68–11	66–6	79–12	73–15	61–12	78–10	52–11	74–14	48–14	45–15	52–19	40–10	31–13	0–3	19–14	17–15	3–5	1–3	2–2	0–1	1274-1557	1274–283	82%
Year-end ranking					3	1	1	1	1	1	2	3	3	2	3	2	4	8	4	7	14	936	49	84	370	672	419	1300	$ 8,641,040		

== ATP career finals ==
=== Singles titles (109) ===
Tournament Category	No. of titles
Grand Slam tournaments	8
Year-End Championships – Grand Prix	1
Year-End Championships – WCT	2
Grand Prix / WCT	98

Titles by surface
Clay outdoor (14)
Grass outdoor (9)
Hard outdoor (31)
Hard indoor (22)
Carpet indoor (33)

No.	Date	Tournament	Surface	Opponent	Score
1.	1972	Jacksonville, US	Hard (i)	(United States) Clark Graebner	7–5, 6–4
2.	1972	Roanoke, US (1)	Carpet (i)	(Czechoslovakia) Vladimír Zedník	6–4, 7–6
3.	1972	Queen's Club, UK (1)	Grass	(United Kingdom) John Paish	6–2, 6–3
4.	1972	Columbus, US (1)	Clay	(Rhodesia) Andrew Pattison	7–5, 6–3, 7–5
5.	1972	Cincinnati, US	Clay	(Argentina) Guillermo Vilas	6–3, 6–3
6.	1972	Albany, US	Hard (i)	(United States) Roscoe Tanner	6–2, 7–6
7.	1973	Baltimore, US	Carpet (i)	(United States) Sandy Mayer	6–4, 7–5
8.	1973	Roanoke, US (2)	Carpet (i)	(Australia) Ian Fletcher	6–2, 6–3
9.	1973	Salt Lake City, US (1)	Hard (i)	(United States) Paul Gerken	6–1, 6–2
10.	1973	Salisbury, US (1)	Carpet (i)	(West Germany) Karl Meiler	3–6, 7–6, 7–6, 6–3
11.	1973	Hampton, US (1)	Carpet (i)	(Romania) Ilie Năstase	4–6, 6–3, 7–5, 6–3
12.	1973	Paramus, US	Hard	(United States) Clark Graebner	6–1, 6–2
13.	1973	Boston, US	Hard	(United States) Arthur Ashe	6–3, 4–6, 6–4, 3–6, 6–2
14.	1973	Columbus, US (2)	Clay	(United States) Charlie Pasarell	3–6, 6–3, 6–3
15.	1973	Los Angeles, US (1)	Hard	(Netherlands) Tom Okker	7–5, 7–6^{(11–9)}
16.	1973	Quebec, Canada	Hard (i)	(United States) Marty Riessen	6–1, 6–4, 6–7, 6–0
17.	1973	Johannesburg, South Africa (1)	Hard	(United States) Arthur Ashe	6–4, 7–6, 6–3
18.	1974	Australian Open	Grass	(Australia) Phil Dent	7–6^{(9–7)}, 6–4, 4–6, 6–3
19.	1974	Roanoke, US (3)	Carpet (i)	(West Germany) Karl Meiler	6–4, 6–3
20.	1974	Little Rock, US	Carpet (i)	(West Germany) Karl Meiler	6–2, 6–1
21.	1974	Birmingham, US (1)	Carpet (i)	(United States) Sandy Mayer	7–5, 6–3
22.	1974	Salisbury, US (2)	Carpet (i)	(South Africa) Frew McMillan	6–4, 7–5, 6–3
23.	1974	Hampton, US (2)	Carpet (i)	(Romania) Ilie Năstase	6–4, 6–4
24.	1974	Salt Lake City, US (2)	Hard (i)	(United States) Vitas Gerulaitis	4–6, 7–6, 6–3
25.	1974	Tempe, US	Hard	(India) Vijay Amritraj	6–1, 6–2
26.	1974	Manchester, UK	Grass	(United Kingdom) Mike Collins	13–11, 6–2
27.	1974	Wimbledon (1)	Grass	(Australia) Ken Rosewall	6–1, 6–1, 6–4
28.	1974	Indianapolis, US (1)	Clay	(Sweden) Björn Borg	5–7, 6–3, 6–4
29.	1974	US Open (1)	Grass	(Australia) Ken Rosewall	6–1, 6–0, 6–1
30.	1974	Los Angeles, US (2)	Hard	(United States) Harold Solomon	6–3, 6–1
31.	1974	London – Dewar Cup, UK	Carpet (i)	(United States) Brian Gottfried	6–2, 7–6
32.	1974	Johannesburg, South Africa (2)	Hard	(United States) Arthur Ashe	7–6, 6–3, 6–1
33.	1975	Nassau, Bahamas	Hard	(West Germany) Karl Meiler	6–0, 6–2
34.	1975	Birmingham, US (2)	Carpet (i)	(United States) Billy Martin	6–4, 6–3
35.	1975	Salisbury, US (3)	Carpet (i)	(United States) Vitas Gerulaitis	5–7, 7–5, 6–1, 3–6, 6–0
36.	1975	Boca Raton, US	Hard	(West Germany) Jürgen Fassbender	6–4, 6–2
37.	1975	Hampton, US (3)	Carpet (i)	(Czechoslovakia) Jan Kodeš	3–6, 6–3, 6–0
38.	1975	Denver, US (1)	Carpet (i)	(United States) Brian Gottfried	6–3, 6–4
39.	1975	North Conway, US (1)	Clay	(Australia) Ken Rosewall	6–2, 6–2
40.	1975	Hamilton, Bermuda	Clay	(United States) Vitas Gerulaitis	6–1, 6–4
41.	1975	Maui, US (1)	Hard	(United States) Sandy Mayer	6–1, 6–0
42.	1976	Birmingham, US (3)	Carpet (i)	(United States) Roscoe Tanner	6–4, 3–6, 6–1
43.	1976	Philadelphia, US (1)	Carpet (i)	(Sweden) Björn Borg	7–6^{(7–5)}, 6–4, 6–0
44.	1976	Hampton, US (4)	Carpet (i)	(Romania) Ilie Năstase	6–2, 6–2, 6–2
45.	1976	Palm Springs, US (1)	Hard	(United States) Roscoe Tanner	6–4, 6–4
46.	1976	Denver, US (2)	Carpet (i)	(Australia) Ross Case	7–6^{(7–1)}, 6–2
47.	1976	Las Vegas, US (1)	Hard	(Australia) Ken Rosewall	6–1, 6–3
48.	1976	Washington, US (1)	Clay	(Mexico) Raúl Ramírez	6–2, 6–4
49.	1976	North Conway, US (2)	Clay	(Mexico) Raúl Ramírez	7–6, 4–6, 6–3
50.	1976	Indianapolis, US (2)	Clay	(Poland) Wojtek Fibak	6–2, 6–4
51.	1976	US Open (2)	Clay	(Sweden) Björn Borg	6–4, 3–6, 7–6^{(11–9)}, 6–4
52.	1976	Cologne, West Germany	Carpet (i)	(South Africa) Frew McMillan	6–2, 6–3
53.	1976	Wembley, UK (1)	Carpet (i)	(United States) Roscoe Tanner	3–6, 7–6^{(8–6)}, 6–4
54.	1977	Birmingham, US (4)	Carpet (i)	(United States) Bill Scanlon	6–3, 6–3
55.	1977	St. Louis WCT, US	Carpet (i)	(Australia) John Alexander	7–6^{(7–4)}, 6–2
56.	1977	Las Vegas, US (2)	Hard	(Mexico) Raúl Ramírez	6–4, 5–7, 6–2
57.	1977	Dallas WCT Finals, US (1)	Carpet (i)	(United States) Dick Stockton	6–7^{(5–7)}, 6–1, 6–4, 6–3
58.	1977	Maui, US (2)	Hard	(United States) Brian Gottfried	6–2, 6–0
59.	1977	Sydney Indoor, Australia (1)	Hard (i)	(Australia) Ken Rosewall	7–5, 6–4, 6–2
60.	1977	Las Vegas – WCT Challenge Cup, US	Carpet (i)	(United States) Roscoe Tanner	6–2, 5–6, 3–6, 6–2, 6–5^{(7–5)}
61.	1977	Tennis Masters Cup, New York	Carpet (i)	(Sweden) Björn Borg	6–4, 1–6, 6–4
62.	1978	Philadelphia, US (2)	Carpet (i)	(United States) Roscoe Tanner	6–2, 6–4, 6–3
63.	1978	Denver, US (3)	Carpet (i)	(United States) Stan Smith	6–2, 7–6^{(7–2)}
64.	1978	Memphis, US (1)	Carpet (i)	(United States) Tim Gullikson	7–6, 6–3
65.	1978	Rotterdam, Netherlands (1)	Carpet (i)	(Mexico) Raúl Ramírez	7–5, 7–5
66.	1978	Birmingham, UK	Grass	(Mexico) Raúl Ramírez	6–3, 6–1, 6–2
67.	1978	Washington, US (2)	Clay	(United States) Eddie Dibbs	7–5, 7–5
68.	1978	Indianapolis, US (3)	Clay	(Spain) José Higueras	7–5, 6–1
69.	1978	Stowe, US (1)	Hard	(United States) Tim Gullikson	6–2, 6–3
70.	1978	US Open (3)	Hard	(Sweden) Björn Borg	6–4, 6–2, 6–2
71.	1978	Sydney Indoor, Australia (2)	Hard (i)	(Australia) Geoff Masters	6–0, 6–0, 6–4
72.	1979	Birmingham, US (5)	Carpet (i)	(United States) Eddie Dibbs	6–2, 3–6, 7–5
73.	1979	Philadelphia, US (3)	Carpet (i)	(United States) Arthur Ashe	6–3, 6–4, 6–1
74.	1979	Memphis, US (2)	Carpet (i)	(United States) Arthur Ashe	6–4, 5–7, 6–3
75.	1979	Tulsa, US	Hard (i)	(United States) Eddie Dibbs	6–7, 7–5, 6–1
76.	1979	Indianapolis, US (4)	Clay	(Argentina) Guillermo Vilas	6–1, 2–6, 6–4
77.	1979	Stowe, US (2)	Hard	(United States) Mike Cahill	6–0, 6–1
78.	1979	Hong Kong	Hard	(United States) Pat DuPré	7–5, 6–3, 6–1
79.	1979	Dorado Beach, US	Hard	(United States) Vitas Gerulaitis	6–5, 6–0, 6–4
80.	1980	Birmingham, US (6)	Carpet (i)	(United States) Eliot Teltscher	6–3, 6–2
81.	1980	Philadelphia, US (4)	Carpet (i)	(United States) John McEnroe	6–3, 2–6, 6–3, 3–6, 6–4
82.	1980	Dallas WCT Finals, US (2)	Carpet (i)	(United States) John McEnroe	2–6, 7–6^{(7–4)}, 6–1, 6–2
83.	1980	North Conway, US (3)	Clay	(United States) Eddie Dibbs	6–3, 5–7, 6–1
84.	1980	Guangzhou Marlboro Tennis Classic	Carpet (i)	(United States) Eliot Teltscher	6–2, 6–4
85.	1980	Tokyo Indoor, Japan (1)	Carpet (i)	(United States) Tom Gullikson	6–1, 6–2
86.	1981	La Quinta, US (2)	Hard	(Czechoslovakia) Ivan Lendl	6–3, 7–6
87.	1981	Brussels, Belgium	Carpet (i)	(United States) Brian Gottfried	6–2, 6–4, 6–3
88.	1981	Rotterdam, Netherlands (2)	Carpet (i)	(United States) Gene Mayer	6–1, 2–6, 6–2
89.	1981	Wembley, UK (2)	Carpet (i)	(United States) John McEnroe	3–6, 2–6, 6–3, 6–4, 6–2
90.	1982	Monterrey, Mexico	Carpet (i)	(South Africa) Johan Kriek	6–2, 3–6, 6–3
91.	1982	Los Angeles, US (3)	Hard	(United States) Mel Purcell	6–2, 6–1
92.	1982	Las Vegas, US (3)	Hard	(United States) Gene Mayer	5–2, ret.
93.	1982	Queen's Club, UK (2)	Grass	(United States) John McEnroe	7–5, 6–3
94.	1982	Wimbledon (2)	Grass	(United States) John McEnroe	3–6, 6–3, 6–7^{(2–7)}, 7–6^{(7–5)}, 6–4
95.	1982	Columbus, US (3)	Hard	(United States) Brian Gottfried	7–5, 6–0
96.	1982	US Open (4)	Hard	(Czechoslovakia) Ivan Lendl	6–3, 6–2, 4–6, 6–4
97.	1983	Memphis, US (3)	Hard (i)	(United States) Gene Mayer	7–5, 6–0
98.	1983	Las Vegas, US (4)	Hard	(Australia) Mark Edmondson	7–6, 6–1
99.	1983	Queen's Club, UK (3)	Grass	(United States) John McEnroe	6–3, 6–3
100.	1983	US Open (5)	Hard	(Czechoslovakia) Ivan Lendl	6–3, 6–7^{(2–7)}, 7–5, 6–0
101.	1984	Memphis, US (4)	Carpet (i)	(France) Henri Leconte	6–3, 4–6, 7–5
102.	1984	La Quinta, US (3)	Hard	(France) Yannick Noah	6–2, 6–7^{(7–9)}, 6–3
103.	1984	Boca West, US	Hard	(United States) Johan Kriek	7–5, 6–4
104.	1984	Los Angeles, US (4)	Hard	(United States) Eliot Teltscher	6–4, 4–6, 6–4
105.	1984	Tokyo Indoor, Japan (2)	Carpet (i)	(Czechoslovakia) Ivan Lendl	6–4, 3–6, 6–0
106.	1988	Washington, US (3)	Hard	(Ecuador) Andrés Gómez	6–1, 6–4
107.	1988	Toulouse, France (1)	Carpet (i)	(Soviet Union) Andrei Chesnokov	6–2, 6–0
108.	1989	Toulouse, France (2)	Carpet (i)	(United States) John McEnroe	6–3, 6–3
109.	1989	Tel Aviv, Israel	Hard	(Israel) Gilad Bloom	2–6, 6–2, 6–1

=== Runner-ups (55) ===
No.	Date	Tournament	Surface	Opponent	Score
1.	1971	Columbus, US	Hard	(United States) Tom Gorman	7–6, 6–7, 6–4, 6–7, 3–6
2.	1971	Los Angeles, US	Hard	(United States) Pancho Gonzales	6–3, 3–6, 3–6
3.	1972	Baltimore, US	Hard	(Romania) Ilie Năstase	6–1, 4–6, 6–7
4.	1972	Washington Indoor, US	Carpet (i)	(United States) Stan Smith	6–4, 1–6, 3–6, 6–4, 1–6
5.	1972	Indianapolis, US	Clay	(South Africa) Bob Hewitt	6–7, 1–6, 2–6
6.	1973	Omaha, US	Hard (i)	(Romania) Ilie Năstase	0–5, ret.
7.	1973	Bretton Woods, US	Clay	(India) Vijay Amritraj	5–7, 6–2, 5–7
8.	1973	Washington-2, US	Carpet (i)	(Romania) Ilie Năstase	4–6, 6–4, 6–2, 5–7, 6–2
9.	1974	Omaha, US	Carpet (i)	(West Germany) Karl Meiler	3–6, 6–1, 3–6
10.	1974	South Orange, US	Hard	(Soviet Union) Alex Metreveli	Walkover
11.	1975	Australian Open, Melbourne	Grass	(Australia) John Newcombe	5–7, 6–3, 4–6, 6–7
12.	1975	New York City, US	Carpet (i)	(United States) Vitas Gerulaitis	Walkover
13.	1975	Wimbledon, London	Grass	(United States) Arthur Ashe	1–6, 1–6, 7–5, 4–6
14.	1975	US Open, New York	Clay	(Spain) Manuel Orantes	4–6, 3–6, 3–6
15.	1975	Stockholm, Sweden	Hard (i)	(Italy) Adriano Panatta	6–4, 3–6, 5–7
16.	1975	London, UK	Carpet (i)	(United States) Eddie Dibbs	6–1, 1–6, 5–7
17.	1976	Salisbury, US	Carpet (i)	(Romania) Ilie Năstase	2–6, 3–6, 6–7
18.	1976	La Costa WCT, US	Hard	(Romania) Ilie Năstase	6–4, 0–6, 1–6
19.	1976	Nottingham	Grass	(Romania) Ilie Năstase	6–2, 4–6, 1–1 (match abandoned rain)
20.	1977	WCT Challenge Cup	Carpet (i)	(Romania) Ilie Năstase	6–3, 6–7, 4–6, 5–7
21.	1977	Philadelphia, US	Carpet (i)	(United States) Dick Stockton	6–3, 4–6, 6–3, 1–6, 2–6
22.	1977	Toronto Indoor WCT, Canada	Carpet (i)	(United States) Dick Stockton	6–5, ret.
23.	1977	Wimbledon, London	Grass	(Sweden) Björn Borg	6–3, 2–6, 1–6, 7–5, 4–6
24.	1977	**Pepsi Grand Slam	Clay	(Sweden) Björn Borg	4–6, 7–5, 3–6
25.	1977	Indianapolis, US	Clay	(Spain) Manuel Orantes	1–6, 3–6
26.	1977	US Open, New York	Clay	(Argentina) Guillermo Vilas	6–2, 3–6, 6–7, 0–6
27.	1978	**Pepsi Grand Slam	Clay	(Sweden) Björn Borg	6–7, 6–3, 1–6
28.	1978	Wimbledon, London	Grass	(Sweden) Björn Borg	2–6, 2–6, 3–6
29.	1979	**Pepsi Grand Slam	Hard	(Sweden) Björn Borg	2–6, 3–6
30.	1979	Las Vegas, US	Hard	(Sweden) Björn Borg	3–6, 2–6
31.	1979	Tokyo Indoor, Japan	Carpet (i)	(Sweden) Björn Borg	2–6, 2–6
32.	1979	WCT Challenge Cup	Carpet (i)	(Sweden) Björn Borg	4–6, 2–6, 6–2, 4–6
33.	1980	Memphis, US	Carpet (i)	(United States) John McEnroe	6–7, 6–7
34.	1980	San José, Costa Rica	Hard	(Argentina) José Luis Clerc	6–4, 6–2, ret.
35.	1981	Monte Carlo	Clay	(Argentina) Guillermo Vilas	5–5 (match abandoned rain)
36.	1981	Hamburg, Germany	Clay	(Australia) Peter McNamara	6–7, 1–6, 6–4, 4–6
37.	1982	Philadelphia, US	Carpet (i)	(United States) John McEnroe	3–6, 3–6, 1–6
38.	1982	Rotterdam, Netherlands	Carpet (i)	(Argentina) Guillermo Vilas	6–0, 2–6, 4–6
39.	1982	Milan, Italy	Carpet (i)	(Argentina) Guillermo Vilas	3–6, 3–6
40.	1982	San Francisco, US	Carpet (i)	(United States) John McEnroe	1–6, 3–6
41.	1983	Wembley, UK	Carpet (i)	(United States) John McEnroe	5–7, 1–6, 4–6
42.	1984	Dallas WCT Finals, US	Carpet (i)	(United States) John McEnroe	1–6, 2–6, 3–6
43.	1984	Wimbledon, London	Grass	(United States) John McEnroe	1–6, 1–6, 2–6
44.	1984	Rotterdam	Hard	(United States) Ivan Lendl	0–6, 0–1 (match abandoned bomb scare)
45.	1985	Ft. Myers, US	Hard	(Czechoslovakia) Ivan Lendl	3–6, 2–6
46.	1985	Chicago, US	Carpet (i)	(United States) John McEnroe	Walkover
47.	1986	Ft. Myers, US	Hard	(Czechoslovakia) Ivan Lendl	2–6, 0–6
48.	1986	Queen's Club, UK	Grass	(United States) Tim Mayotte	4–6, 1–2, ret.
49.	1986	Cincinnati, US	Hard	(Sweden) Mats Wilander	4–6, 1–6
50.	1986	San Francisco, US	Carpet (i)	(United States) John McEnroe	6–7, 3–6
51.	1987	Memphis, US	Hard (i)	(Sweden) Stefan Edberg	3–6, 1–2, ret.
52.	1987	Orlando, US	Hard	(South Africa) Christo van Rensburg	3–6, 6–3, 1–6
53.	1987	Queen's Club, UK	Grass	(West Germany) Boris Becker	7–6, 3–6, 4–6
54.	1988	Milan, Italy	Carpet (i)	(France) Yannick Noah	4–4, ret.
55.	1988	Miami, US	Hard	(Sweden) Mats Wilander	4–6, 6–4, 4–6, 4–6

- ** The "Pepsi Grand Slam" was a four-man invitational tournament not bringing ATP-ranking points. It is included in the ATP Tour statistics even though it was an ITF event.

=== Other singles titles ===
Here are Connors's tournament titles that are not included in the statistics on the Association of Tennis Professionals Web site. These mainly are special events like invitational tournaments and exhibitions (24).

Year	Date	Tournament	Surface	Prize money	Opponent	Score	Winner's prize
1972	Aug 14–20	Ocean City – Ocean Pines Invitational	Hard	$5,000	(United States) Herb Fitzgibbon	6–3, 6–2	$1,500
1978	Jun 10	Kent All Comers Championship, Beckenham	Grass		(United States) Stan Smith	9–8, 6–3	
1978	Nov 23–26	Kobe & Tokyo – Gunze Invitational	Carpet (i)		(Romania) Ilie Năstase	6–2, 6–4	
1978	Dec 5–8	Lucerne Lucerne Invitational	Carpet (i)		(Netherlands) Tom Okker	6–1, 6–1	
1979	Sep 28–30	Asunción – Boqueron International	Clay		(Argentina) Guillermo Vilas	7–5, 6–3	
1980	May 15–18	Louisville International Classic	?	$104,000	(United States) Eddie Dibbs	6–2, 6–3	$36,000
1980	Aug 4–10	Fréjus – 8-men round robin	Hard		(United States) Roscoe Tanner	6–0, 6–7, 6–4	
1980	Oct 8–12	Melbourne – Mazda Challenge	Carpet		(United States) Gene Mayer	1–6, 6–2, 6–0, 7–5	
1982	Jan 6–11	Rosemont – Michelob Light Challenge of Champions	Carpet (i)	$310,000	(United States) John McEnroe	6–7, 7–5, 6–7, 7–5, 6–4	
1982	Sep 29 – Oct 3	Montreal – Molson Light Challenge Cup	Hard (i)	$250,000	(Sweden) Björn Borg	6–4, 6–3	$80,000
1982	Dec 17–19	North Miami Beach – Nastase-Hamptons Invitational	Hard	$305,000	(United States) Brian Teacher	6–2, 6–2	$80,000
1983	Feb 8–13	Toronto – Molson Challenge	Carpet (i)		(Spain) José Higueras	6–2, 6–0, 5–7, 6–0	
1983	May 12–15	Tulsa Bank of Oklahoma Tennis Classic	Hard		(United States) Roscoe Tanner	6–4, 6–3	
1983	Jul 28–31	Beaver Creek – Vail Beaver Creek Classic	Hard		(Sweden) Mats Wilander	7–6, 6–2	
1983	Aug 3–7	Newport Beach – High Stakes	Hard	$300,000	(United States) Tim Mayotte	6–3, 6–4, 6–2	$100,000
1983	Oct 5–9	Vancouver Labbat's Invitational	Carpet (i)		(United States) Bill Scanlon	6–1, 6–2, 6–2	
1983	Dec 14–20	North Miami Beach – Nastase-Hamptons Invitational	Hard	$305,000	(Czechoslovakia) Ivan Lendl	6–3, 7–6, 6–1	$90,000
1984	Jan 3–8	Rosemont – Lite Challenge of Champions	Carpet (i)	$250,000	(Ecuador) Andrés Gómez	6–3, 6–2, 6–1	
1985	Apr 25–28	Tulsa Bank of Oklahoma Tennis Classic	Hard		(France) Yannick Noah	6–4, 6–4	
1985	Jul 26–29	Beaver Creek Kiva Tennis Classic	Hard		(Sweden) Mats Wilander	6–4, 6–4	
1985	Jul 30 – Aug 4	Head Cup	Hard		(United States) Gene Mayer	2–6, 6–3, 6–4	
1986	Apr 24–27	Tulsa Bank of Oklahoma Tennis Classic	Hard		(United States) Kevin Curren	6–3, 6–2	
1986	Sep 11–14	Amelia Island Dupont All American	Hard		(United States) Aaron Krickstein	4–6, 6–2, 6–0	
1987	Jul 16–19	Beaver Creek Vail Tennis Classic	Hard		(United States) Tim Mayotte	1–6, 6–3, 7–6	

=== Other singles titles (4–8 man fields) ===
These are non-ATP, exhibition and special events (16)

Year	Date	Tournament	Surface	Final opponent	Final result	Winner's prize
1972	June 8–11	Nottingham – 4-men invitational Round robin	Grass	Colin Dibley	4–6, 7–6, 7–5	
1978	September 22–24	Buenos Aires – 4-men invitational	Carpet (i)	Björn Borg	5–7, 6–3, 6–3	
1979	July 27–28	Montpellier Invitational Tennis Tournament – 4-men invitational	Hard	John McEnroe	7–6, 2–6, 7–5	
1979	September 15–16	Rio de Janeiro – 4-men invitational	Clay	Guillermo Vilas	6–3, 6–4, 6–3	
1979	October 3–5	Buenos Aires – Indoor round robin	Carpet (i)	Víctor Pecci	6–2, 1–6, 6–2	
1980	March 6–7	Munich – 4-men invitational	Carpet (i)	Vitas Gerulaitis	6–1, 6–7, 6–4	
1980	April 7–8	Tokyo – Suntory Cup	Carpet (i)	John McEnroe	7–5, 6–3	
1980	September 19–20	Napa Valley Harvest Cup	Hard	Roscoe Tanner	6–4, 6–2	
1981	April 11–12	Tokyo – Suntory Cup	Carpet (i)	John McEnroe	6–4, 7–6	
1981	November 17–18	Tel Aviv – Golden Racquet Sabirna Gali	?	Ilie Năstase	6–4, 6–2	
1982	July 22–24	Industry Hills – $100,000 4-men invitational	Hard	Björn Borg	5–7, 6–2, 6–2, 6–7, 6–2	$50,000
1983	April 10–11	Tokyo – Suntory Cup	Carpet (i)	Björn Borg	6–3, 6–4	
1983	July 8–10	Sun City – Round robin Bophuthatswana	Hard	Ivan Lendl	7–5, 7–6	$400,000
1983	October 15–16	Atlantic City Jimmy Connors Invitational	Hard (I)	Gene Mayer	7–6, 6–4	$150,000
1986	April 19–20	Tokyo – Suntory Cup	Carpet (i)	Mats Wilander	6–4, 6–0	
1989	May 5–7	Nîmes	Clay	Anders Järryd	6–2, 6–3	

=== Challenge matches / Exhibition matches (2 players) / amateur titles (50) ===
1970: Modesto, California (amateur title) – Final opponent: Robert Potthast 4–6 6–4 6–3

1975: Ilie Năstase – Syracuse, N.Y. 6–4 6–7 6–2

1975: Rod Laver – Las Vegas 6–4, 6–2, 3–6, 7–5.

1975: Vitas Gerulaitis – Ridgefield, Connecticut 6–3 7–6

1975: John Newcombe – Las Vegas 6–3, 4–6, 6–2, 6–4

1976: Manuel Orantes – Las Vegas 6–2 6–2 6–1

1976: Ilie Năstase – Providence 6–4 6–1

1976: Tony Roche – Hartford (Aetna World Cup WCT) 6–4 7–5

1976: John Newcombe – Hartford (Aetna World Cup WCT) 6–2 6–3

1977: John Alexander – Hartford (Aetna World Cup WCT) 6–1 6–4

1977: Tony Roche – Hartford (Aetna World Cup WCT) 6–4 7–5

1977: Ilie Năstase – Puerto Rico 4–6 6–3 7–5 6–3

1978: John Newcombe – New Haven (Aetna World Cup WCT) 6–4 6–4

1978: John Alexander – New Haven (Aetna World Cup WCT) 6–2 6–4

1978: Eddie Dibbs – Toledo, Ohio 6–4 6–4

1979: Hank Pfister – São Paulo (Brasil) 3–6 6–2 6–4 6–1

1979: Guillermo Vilas – Buenos Aires 7–5 6–3 6–3

1980: Adriano Panatta – Copenhagen 6–4 6–1

1980: Björn Borg – Copenhagen 6–4 6–2

1980: Ilie Năstase – Detroit 7-6 6-3

1980: Ilie Năstase – Toronto 6-3 6-4

1980: Eddie Dibbs – Portland 6–4 7–6

1980: Eddie Dibbs – San Diego 6-4 6-3

1980: Roscoe Tanner – Napa Valley (Harvest Cup) 6–4 6–2

1981: Ilie Năstase – San Diego

1981: Ilie Năstase – Portland (Peugeot Tennis Invitatonal) 6–2 6–2

1982: Björn Borg – Richmond 6–4 3–6 7–5 6–3

1982: Björn Borg – Seattle 6–4 3–6 7–5

1982: Björn Borg – Los Angeles 6–3 2–6 6–2

1982: Björn Borg – Vancouver 6–2 5–7 6–4

1982: Björn Borg – San Francisco 7–5 7–6

1983: Björn Borg – Bâton-Rouge 6–7 6–4 6–4

1983: Björn Borg – Providence 6–4 6–4

1983: Björn Borg – Séoul 5–7 6–1 4–6 6–4 7–6

1983: Ivan Lendl – San Diego 6–2 5–7 6–1

1983: Kevin Curren – Cape Town (Southafrica) 2–6 7–6 7–6 6–4

1983: Vitas Gerulaitis – Portland (Peugeot Tennis Invitatonal) 6–3 7–5

1983: Ilie Năstase – Tampa 6–2 7–5

1984: John McEnroe – Seattle (Peugeot Invitational)3–6 6-2 6-3 The Straits Times 27 Sept. 1984 Connors settles a score SEATTLE, Wed. Jimmy Connors beat John McEnroe In a "grudge match" yesterday la the Peugeot Invitatlonal Exhibition match here. Connors, whs lost to McEnroe In this year's United States Open, staged a comeback after dropping the first set M. Connors took the last two sets ft-2

1984: Andrés Gómez – Jakarta (Indonesia) 6–4 6–2

1984: Andrés Gómez – Kuala Lumpur (Malaysia) 6–1 7–6

1986: John McEnroe – Ottawa 6–4 6–3 6–3

1986: Björn Borg – Tokyo (2 may) 4–6 6–2 6–4

1986: Björn Borg – Tokyo (3 may)

1986: Björn Borg – Tokyo (4 may)

1986: Aaron Krickstein – New Orleans

1986: Yannick Noah – Inglewood (Michelin Tennis Challenge) 2–4 ret.

1987: Tim Mayotte – Inglewood (Michelin Tennis Challenge) 7–5 7–6

1988: Andre Agassi – Auburn Hills (Kings of Tennis Classic) 7–6 6–3

1992: John McEnroe – Inglewood (Michelin Tennis Challenge) 6–4 3–6 6–3

=== Sources ===
The following are the sources for the information that is not on the Association of Tennis Professionals Web site:

- Michel Sutter, Vainqueurs Winners 1946–2003, Paris 2003. Sutter has attempted to list all tournaments meeting his criteria for selection beginning with 1946 and ending in the fall of 1991. For each tournament, he has indicated the city, the date of the final, the winner, the runner-up, and the score of the final. A tournament is included in his list if: (1), the draw for the tournament included at least eight players (with a few exceptions, such as the Pepsi Grand Slam tournaments in the second half of the 1970s); and (2), the level of the tournaments was at least equal to the present-day challenger tournaments. Sutter's book probably is the most exhaustive source of tennis tournament information since World War II, even though some professional tournaments held before the start of the open era are missing. Later, Sutter issued a second edition of his book, with only the players, their wins, and years for the period of 1946 through April 27, 2003.
- John Barrett, editor, World of Tennis Yearbooks, London from 1976 through 1983.

=== Doubles final: 27 (16 titles / 11 runner-ups) ===
Result	W-L	Date	Tournament	Surface	Partner	Opponents	Score
Loss	0–1	Feb 1971	New York, US	Hard (i)	(Pakistan) Haroon Rahim	(Spain) Juan Gisbert (Spain) Manuel Orantes	6–7, 2–6
Loss	0–2	Aug 1971	Columbus, US	Hard	(United States) Roscoe Tanner	(United States) Jim McManus (United States) Jim Osborne	7–6, 4–6, 2–6
Win	1–2	Jul 1972	Columbus, US	Hard	(United States) Pancho Gonzales	(United States) Robert McKinley (United States) Dick Stockton	6–3, 7–5
Win	2–2	Sep 1972	Los Angeles WCT, US	Hard	(United States) Pancho Gonzales	(Egypt) Ismail El Shafei (New Zealand) Brian Fairlie	6–3, 4–6, 7–6
Win	3–2	Jan 1973	Baltimore WCT, US	Hard (i)	(United States) Clark Graebner	(United States) Paul Gerken (United States) Sandy Mayer	3–6, 6–2, 6–3
Win	4–2	Jan 1973	Roanoke, US	Hard	(Spain) Juan Gisbert	(Australia) Ian Fletcher (United States) Butch Seewagen	6–0, 7–6
Loss	4–3	Jan 1973	Omaha, US	Hard (i)	(Spain) Juan Gisbert	(United States) William Brown (United States) Mike Estep	DEF
Loss	4–4	Mar 1973	Hampton, US	Hard (i)	(Romania) Ion Țiriac	(United States) Clark Graebner (Romania) Ilie Năstase	2–6, 1–6
Loss	4–5	Jun 1973	French Open, Paris	Clay	(Romania) Ilie Năstase	(Australia) John Newcombe (Netherlands) Tom Okker	1–6, 6–3, 3–6, 7–5, 4–6
Win	5–5	Jul 1973	Wimbledon, London	Grass	(Romania) Ilie Năstase	(Australia) John Cooper (Australia) Neale Fraser	3–6, 6–3, 6–4, 8–9, 6–1
Win	6–5	Aug 1973	South Orange, US	Hard	(Romania) Ilie Năstase	(United States) Pancho Gonzales (United States) Tom Gorman	6–7, 6–3, 6–2
Loss	6–6	Sep 1973	Los Angeles, US	Hard	(Romania) Ilie Năstase	(Czechoslovakia) Jan Kodeš (Czechoslovakia) Vladimir Zednik	2–6, 4–6
Loss	6–7	Oct 1973	Quebec, Canada	Carpet (i)	(United States) Marty Riessen	(Australia) Bob Carmichael (South Africa) Frew McMillan	2–6, 6–7
Win	7–7	Nov 1973	Stockholm, Sweden	Hard (i)	(Romania) Ilie Năstase	(Australia) Bob Carmichael (South Africa) Frew McMillan	6–3, 6–7, 6–2
Win	8–7	Feb 1974	Salisbury, US	Carpet (i)	(South Africa) Frew McMillan	(South Africa) Byron Bertram (Rhodesia) Andrew Pattison	3–6, 6–2, 6–1
Win	9–7	Mar 1974	Salt Lake City, US	Hard (i)	(United States) Vitas Gerulaitis	(Colombia) Iván Molina (Colombia) Jairo Velasco Sr.	2–6, 7–6, 7–5
Win	10–7	Aug 1974	Indianapolis, US	Clay	(Romania) Ilie Năstase	(West Germany) Jürgen Fassbender (West Germany) Hans-Jürgen Pohmann	6–7, 6–3, 6–4
Win	11–7	Nov 1974	London, UK	Carpet (i)	(Romania) Ilie Năstase	(United States) Brian Gottfried (Mexico) Raúl Ramírez	3–6, 7–6, 6–3
Win	12–7	Feb 1975	Salisbury, US	Carpet (i)	(Romania) Ilie Năstase	(Czechoslovakia) Jan Kodeš (United Kingdom) Roger Taylor	7–6, 6–2
Loss	12–8	Jun 1975	Rome, Italy	Clay	(Romania) Ilie Năstase	(United States) Brian Gottfried (Mexico) Raúl Ramírez	4–6, 6–7, 6–2, 1–6
Win	13–8	Aug 1975	South Orange, US	Clay	(Romania) Ilie Năstase	(Australia) Dick Crealy (United Kingdom) John Lloyd	6–2, 6–3
Win	14–8	Sep 1975	US Open, New York	Clay	(Romania) Ilie Năstase	(Netherlands) Tom Okker (United States) Marty Riessen	6–4, 7–6
Loss	14–9	Nov 1975	London, UK	Carpet	(Romania) Ilie Năstase	(Poland) Wojciech Fibak (West Germany) Karl Meiler	1–6, 5–7
Win	15–9	Jan 1976	Birmingham, US	Carpet	(United States) Erik van Dillen	(United States) Hank Pfister (United States) Dennis Ralston	7–6, 6–4
Loss	15–10	Apr 1976	Denver WCT, US	Carpet (i)	(United States) Billy Martin	(Australia) John Alexander (Australia) Phil Dent	7–6, 2–6, 5–7
Loss	15–11	Jul 1976	Washington, D.C., US	Clay	(United States) Arthur Ashe	(United States) Brian Gottfried (Mexico) Raúl Ramírez	3–6, 3–6
Win	16–11	Aug 1980	North Conway, US	Clay	(United States) Brian Gottfried	(South Africa) Kevin Curren (United States) Steve Denton	7–6, 6–2

== Record against No. 1 players ==
Connors' match record against players who have been ranked world No. 1.

Player	Years	Matches	Record	Win %	Hard	Clay	Grass	Carpet
(Australia) John Newcombe	1973–1979	6	4–2	67%	2–0	0–0	0–2	2–0
(Sweden) Stefan Edberg	1984–1991	12	6–6	50%	4–5	1–0	0–0	1–1
(Romania) Ilie Năstase	1971–1984	28	12–16	43%	2–3	1–1	0–1	9–11
(United States) John McEnroe	1977–1991	34	14–20	41%	4–7	3–1	4–3	3–9
(Czech Republic) / (United States) Ivan Lendl	1979–1992	35	13–22	37%	5–14	2–2	2–0	4–6
(Sweden) Björn Borg	1973–1981	23	8–15	35%	3–3	3–3	0–4	2–5
(United States) Andre Agassi	1988–1989	2	0–2	0%	0–2	0–0	0–0	0–0
(United States) Pete Sampras	1992	2	0–2	0%	0–1	0–1	0–0	0–0
(United States) Jim Courier	1985–1992	3	0–3	0%	0–1	0–0	0–0	0–2
(Sweden) Mats Wilander	1984–1988	5	0–5	0%	0–4	0–1	0–0	0–0
(Germany) Boris Becker	1986–1992	6	0–6	0%	0–1	0–1	0–1	0–3
