= 1979 Birmingham WCT =

- Date: January 15–21
- Edition: 7th
- Category: Grand Prix (WCT)
- Draw: 32S / 16D
- Prize money: $175,000
- Surface: Carpet / indoor
- Location: Birmingham, United States

Champions

Singles
- (United States) Jimmy Connors

Doubles
- (United States) Stan Smith / (United States) Dick Stockton
← 1978 ·	Birmingham International Indoor	· 1980 →

The 1979 Birmingham WCT was a men's tennis tournament played on indoor carpet courts. It was the seventh edition of the Grand Prix Birmingham, and part of the 1979 Colgate Palmolive Grand Prix. It took place in Birmingham, Alabama, United States from January 15 through January 21, 1979. First-seeded Jimmy Connors won the singles title, his fifth at the event.

== Finals ==
=== Singles ===
(United States) Jimmy Connors defeated (United States) Eddie Dibbs 6–2, 3–6, 7–5

- It was Connors' 1st singles title of the year and the 72nd of his career.

=== Doubles ===
(United States) Stan Smith / (United States) Dick Stockton defeated (Romania) Ilie Năstase / (Netherlands) Tom Okker 6–2, 6–3
