= 1977 Alan King Tennis Classic – Doubles =

Doubles
- 1977 Alan King Tennis Classic

Final
- Champions: (United States) Bob Lutz (United States) Stan Smith
- Runners-up: (South Africa) Bob Hewitt (Mexico) Raúl Ramírez
- Score: 6–3, 3–6, 6–4

Events
Singles	Doubles
← 1976 ·	Alan King Tennis Classic	· 1978 →

Second-seeded Bob Lutz and Stan Smith won the title, defeating top-seeds Bob Hewitt and Raúl Ramírez in the final.

== Draw ==
=== Key ===
- Q = Qualifier
- WC = Wild card
- LL = Lucky loser
- Alt = Alternate
- ITF = ITF entry
- PR = Protected ranking
- SR = Special ranking
- SE = Special exempt
- JE = Junior exempt
- JR = Junior Accelerator Programme entrant
- CO = College Accelerator Programme entrant
- NG = Next Gen Accelerator Program entrant
- w/o = Walkover
- r = Retired
- d = Defaulted

=== Draw ===
First round
1	(South Africa) B Hewitt (Mexico) R Ramírez	6	6
(United States) C Richey (United States) B Teacher	4	4
(United States) T Gullikson (United States) T Gullikson	6	6
(Australia) C Dibley (Australia) G Masters	2	4
(New Zealand) B Fairlie (Australia) K Rosewall	7	6
(Chile) J Fillol (New Zealand) O Parun	6	1
(South Africa) B Mitton (South Africa) R Moore	6	6	1
(Italy) A Panatta (United States) R Tanner	7	3	6
(India) A Amritraj (India) V Amritraj	7	6	7
(United States) J Borowiak (Sweden) O Bengtson	6	7	5
(United States) J McManus (Rhodesia) A Pattison	4	2
(Australia) J Alexander (Australia) P Dent	6	6
(Australia) M Edmondson (Australia) K Warwick	6	5	3
(Australia) P Kronk (United Kingdom) J Lloyd	3	7	6
(United States) B Martin (United States) B Scanlon	3	6
2	(United States) B Lutz (United States) S Smith	6	7

Quarterfinals
1	(South Africa) B Hewitt (Mexico) R Ramírez	7	6
(United States) T Gullikson (United States) T Gullikson	6	1
(New Zealand) B Fairlie (Australia) K Rosewall	6	6	7
(Italy) A Panatta (United States) R Tanner	6	6	1
(India) A Amritraj (India) V Amritraj	7	6
(Australia) J Alexander (Australia) P Dent	6	4
(Australia) P Kronk (United Kingdom) J Lloyd	6	5
2	(United States) B Lutz (United States) S Smith	7	7

Semifinals
1	(South Africa) B Hewitt (Mexico) R Ramírez	6	6
(New Zealand) B Fairlie (Australia) K Rosewall	2	4
(India) A Amritraj (India) V Amritraj	4	2
2	(United States) B Lutz (United States) S Smith	6	6

Final
1	(South Africa) B Hewitt (Mexico) R Ramírez	3	6	4
2	(United States) B Lutz (United States) S Smith	6	3	6
