= 1977 Alan King Tennis Classic =

- Date: April 25 – May 1
- Edition: 6th
- Category: Non-tour
- Draw: 32S / 16D
- Prize money: $250,000
- Surface: Hard / outdoor
- Location: Las Vegas, NV, U.S.
- Venue: Caesars Palace

Champions

Singles
- (United States) Jimmy Connors

Doubles
- (United States) Bob Lutz / (United States) Stan Smith
| ← 1976 · | Alan King Tennis Classic | · 1978 → |

The 1977 Alan King Tennis Classic was a men's tennis tournament played on outdoor hard courts at the Caesars Palace in Las Vegas, Nevada in the United States that was sanctioned by the ATP. It was the sixth edition of the tournament held from April 25 through May 1, 1977. First-seeded Jimmy Connors won the singles title for the second time. Connors earned $50,000 first-prize money and a $7,000 new car.

== Finals ==
=== Singles ===
(United States) Jimmy Connors defeated (Mexico) Raúl Ramírez 6–4, 5–7, 6–2

- It was Connors' 3rd singles title of the year and the 56th of his career.

=== Doubles ===
(United States) Bob Lutz / (United States) Stan Smith defeated (South Africa) Bob Hewitt / (Mexico) Raúl Ramírez 6–3, 3–6, 6–4
