= 1976 Birmingham International =

- Date: January 20–25
- Edition: 4th
- Category: USTA Indoor Circuit
- Draw: 32S / 16D
- Prize money: $30,000
- Surface: Carpet / indoor
- Location: Birmingham, United States

Champions

Singles
- (United States) Jimmy Connors

Doubles
- (United States) Jimmy Connors / (United States) Erik van Dillen
← 1975 ·	ATP Birmingham	· 1977 →

The 1976 Birmingham International was a men's tennis tournament played on indoor carpet courts. It was the fourth edition of the Grand Prix Birmingham, and part of the 1976 USTA Indoor Circuit. It took place in Birmingham, Alabama, United States from January 20 through January 25, 1976. First-seeded Jimmy Connors won the singles title, his third consecutive at the event, and earned $10,000 first-prize money.

== Finals ==
=== Singles ===
(United States) Jimmy Connors defeated (United States) Roscoe Tanner 6–4, 3–6, 6–1

- It was Connors' 1st singles title of the year and the 42nd of his career.

=== Doubles ===
(United States) Jimmy Connors / (United States) Erik van Dillen defeated (United States) Hank Pfister / (United States) Dennis Ralston 6–3, 6–2
