= 1976 Alan King Tennis Classic =

- Date: May 10–16
- Edition: 5th
- Category: Non-tour
- Draw: 32S / 16D
- Prize money: $150,000
- Surface: Hard / outdoor
- Location: Las Vegas, Nevada, U.S
- Venue: Caesars Palace

Champions

Singles
- (United States) Jimmy Connors

Doubles
- (United States) Arthur Ashe / (United States) Charlie Pasarell
← 1975 ·	Alan King Tennis Classic	· 1977 →

The 1976 Alan King Tennis Classic was a men's tennis tournament played on outdoor hard courts at the Caesars Palace in Las Vegas, Nevada in the United States that was sanctioned by the ATP but not part of the Grand Prix or World Championship Tennis circuits. It was the fifth edition of the tournament held from May 10 through 16, 1976. First-seeded Jimmy Connors won the singles title for the first time and earned $30,000 first-prize money as well as a new car.

== Finals ==
=== Singles ===
(United States) Jimmy Connors defeated (Australia) Ken Rosewall 6–1, 6–3

- It was Connors' 6th singles title of the year, and the 47th of his career.

=== Doubles ===
(United States) Arthur Ashe / (United States) Charlie Pasarell defeated (United States) Bob Lutz / (United States) Stan Smith 6–4, 6–2
