= 1978 Birmingham WCT =

- Date: January 9–15
- Edition: 6th
- Category: Grand Prix (WCT)
- Draw: 32S / 16D
- Prize money: $175,000
- Surface: Carpet / indoor
- Location: Birmingham, United States

Champions

Singles
- (Sweden) Björn Borg

Doubles
- (United States) Vitas Gerulaitis / (United States) Sandy Mayer
← 1977 ·	Birmingham International Indoor	· 1979 →

The 1978 Birmingham WCT was a men's tennis tournament played on indoor carpet courts. It was the sixth edition of the Grand Prix Birmingham, and part of the 1978 Colgate Palmolive Grand Prix. It took place in Birmingham, Alabama, United States from January 9 through January 15, 1978. First-seeded Björn Borg won the singles title and earned $30,000 first-prize money.

== Finals ==
=== Singles ===
(Sweden) Björn Borg defeated (United States) Dick Stockton 7–6^{(7–4)}, 7–5

- It was Borg's 1st singles title of the year and the 31st of his career.

=== Doubles ===
(United States) Vitas Gerulaitis / (United States) Sandy Mayer defeated (South Africa) Frew McMillan / (United States) Dick Stockton 3–6, 6–1, 7–6
