= 1976 WCT Challenge Cup =

- Date: February 15 – May 23
- Edition: 1st
- Category: World Championship Tennis
- Draw: 8S
- Prize money: $320,000
- Surface: Hard / indoor Hard / outdoor
- Location: Honolulu, Hawaii, US
- Venue: Honolulu International Center; Holua Stadium

Champions

Singles
- (Romania) Ilie Năstase
WCT Challenge Cup	· 1977 →

The 1976 WCT Challenge Cup, also known as the Avis Challenge Cup for sponsorship reasons, was a men's tennis tournament played on indoor hard courts at the Honolulu International Center and on outdoor hard courts at the Holua Stadium in Honolulu, Hawaii in United States that was part of the 1976 World Championship Tennis circuit. It was the inaugural edition of the tournament and was held during a four-month period from February 15 through May 23, 1976. Ilie Năstase won the title.

== Finals ==
=== Singles ===
(Romania) Ilie Năstase defeated (United States) Arthur Ashe 6–3, 1–6, 6–7, 6–3, 6–1

- It was Năstase's 4th singles title of the year and the 57th of his career.
