= 1978 U.S. Pro Indoor – Doubles =

Doubles
- 1978 U.S. Pro Indoor

Final
- Champions: (South Africa) Bob Hewitt (South Africa) Frew McMillan
- Runners-up: (United States) Vitas Gerulaitis (United States) Sandy Mayer
- Score: 6–4, 6–4

Events
Singles	Doubles
← 1977 ·	U.S. Pro Indoor	· 1979 →

Bob Hewitt and Frew McMillan were the defending champions.

Hewitt and McMillan successfully defended their title, defeating Vitas Gerulaitis and Sandy Mayer 6–4, 6–4 in the final.

== Seeds ==
1. (South Africa) Bob Hewitt / (South Africa) Frew McMillan (champions)
2. (Poland) Wojtek Fibak / (Netherlands) Tom Okker (first round)
3. (United States) Brian Gottfried / (Mexico) Raúl Ramírez (second round)
4. (United States) Marty Riessen / (United States) Dick Stockton (semifinals)
5. (Australia) Syd Ball / (Australia) Ross Case (semifinals)
6. (United States) Fred McNair / (United States) Sherwood Stewart (quarterfinals)
7. (Australia) John Alexander / (Australia) Ken Rosewall (quarterfinals)
8. (Czechoslovakia) Jan Kodeš / (Hungary) Balázs Taróczy (second round)

== Draw ==
=== Key ===
- Q = Qualifier
- WC = Wild card
- LL = Lucky loser
- Alt = Alternate
- SE = Special exempt
- PR = Protected ranking
- ITF = ITF entry
- JE = Junior exempt
- w/o = Walkover
- r = Retired
- d = Defaulted
- SR = Special ranking

=== Finals ===
Semifinals
1	(South Africa) Bob Hewitt (South Africa) Frew McMillan	7^{7}	7
4	(United States) Marty Riessen (United States) Dick Stockton	6^{4}	5
5	(Australia) Syd Ball (Australia) Ross Case	1	6	3
(United States) Vitas Gerulaitis (United States) Sandy Mayer	6	3	6

Final
1	(South Africa) Bob Hewitt (South Africa) Frew McMillan	6	6
(United States) Vitas Gerulaitis (United States) Sandy Mayer	4	4

=== Top half ===
First round
1	(South Africa) B Hewitt (South Africa) F McMillan	w/o
(Spain) J Higueras (Spain) M Orantes
(Italy) C Barazzutti (Italy) A Zugarelli	3	2
(United States) CB Cox (South Africa) C Drysdale	6	6
4	(United States) M Riessen (United States) D Stockton	w/o
(Italy) P Bertolucci (Italy) A Panatta
(United States) E Dibbs (United States) H Solomon	2	4
6	(United States) F McNair (United States) S Stewart	6	6

Second round
1	(South Africa) B Hewitt (South Africa) F McMillan	6	6
(Socialist Federal Republic of Yugoslavia) Ž Franulović (United Kingdom) B Mottram	4	0
(United States) CB Cox (South Africa) C Drysdale	6	7^{7}
8	(Czechoslovakia) J Kodeš (Hungary) B Taróczy	3	6^{3}
4	(United States) M Riessen (United States) D Stockton	7^{7}	6
(South Africa) R Moore (United States) R Tanner	6^{4}	4
(United States) T Leonard (United States) M Machette	3	5
6	(United States) F McNair (United States) S Stewart	6	7

Quarterfinals
1	(South Africa) B Hewitt (South Africa) F McMillan	6	6
(United States) CB Cox (South Africa) C Drysdale	4	2
4	(United States) M Riessen (United States) D Stockton	6	6
6	(United States) F McNair (United States) S Stewart	1	3

Semifinals
1	(South Africa) B Hewitt (South Africa) F McMillan	7^{7}	7
4	(United States) M Riessen (United States) D Stockton	6^{4}	5

=== Bottom half ===
First round
(United States) J Borowiak (Australia) D Crealy	7^{7}	6
(United States) P Fleming (United States) B Scanlon	6^{4}	3
(Czechoslovakia) J Hřebec (United States) V Winitsky	3	1
3	(United States) B Gottfried (Mexico) R Ramírez	6	6
(United States) M Cahill (United States) T Moor	4	6	6
(United States) Ti Gullikson (United States) To Gullikson	6	4	1
(United States) V Gerulaitis (United States) S Mayer	6	6
2	(Poland) W Fibak (Netherlands) T Okker	1	4

Second round
5	(Australia) S Ball (Australia) R Case	6	6
(United States) J Borowiak (Australia) D Crealy	3	1
(United States) M Fishbach (Romania) I Năstase	7	6
3	(United States) B Gottfried (Mexico) R Ramírez	5	3
7	(Australia) J Alexander (Australia) K Rosewall	6	6
(United States) M Cahill (United States) T Moor	3	4
(United States) H Pfister (United States) B Walts	1	4
(United States) V Gerulaitis (United States) S Mayer	6	6

Quarterfinals
5	(Australia) S Ball (Australia) R Case	6	6
(United States) M Fishbach (Romania) I Năstase	3	4
7	(Australia) J Alexander (Australia) K Rosewall	2	1
(United States) V Gerulaitis (United States) S Mayer	6	6

Semifinals
5	(Australia) S Ball (Australia) R Case	1	6	3
(United States) V Gerulaitis (United States) S Mayer	6	3	6
