= 1980 Birmingham Open =

- Date: January 14–20
- Edition: 8th
- Category: Grand Prix (WCT)
- Draw: 32S / 16D
- Prize money: $175,000
- Surface: Carpet / indoor
- Location: Birmingham, United States

Champions

Singles
- (United States) Jimmy Connors

Doubles
- (Poland) Wojciech Fibak / (Netherlands) Tom Okker
- Birmingham International Indoor

The 1980 Birmingham International Indoor was a men's tennis tournament played on indoor carpet courts. It was the eighth and last edition of the Grand Prix Birmingham, and part of the 1980 Volvo Grand Prix circuit. It took place in Birmingham, Alabama, United States from January 14 through January 20, 1980. First-seeded Jimmy Connors won the singles title, his sixth at the event.

== Finals ==
=== Singles ===
(United States) Jimmy Connors defeated (United States) Eliot Teltscher 6–3, 6–2

- It was Connors' 1st singles title of the year and the 80th of his career.

=== Doubles ===
(Poland) Wojciech Fibak / (Netherlands) Tom Okker defeated (Argentina) José Luis Clerc / (Romania) Ilie Nastase, 6–3, 6–3

== Singles main draw entrants ==
=== Seeds ===
Country	Player	Rank^{1}	Seed
USA	Jimmy Connors	2	1
USA	Vitas Gerulaitis	4	2
N/A	N/A	N/A	3
N/A	N/A	N/A	4
USA	Eddie Dibbs	10	5
USA	Peter Fleming	13	6
POL	Wojciech Fibak	15	7
ARG	José Luis Clerc	17	8

- ^{1} Rankings as of December 26, 1979.

=== Other entrants ===
The following players received entry into the singles main draw as lucky losers:

- (United States) Manuel Diaz
- (United States) Tim Garcia

The following players received entry from the qualifying draw:

- (United States) David Dowlen
- (United States) Joel Bailey

== Doubles main draw entrants ==
=== Seeds ===
Country	Player	Country	Player	Seed
USA	Peter Fleming	SWI	Heinz Gunthardt	1
POL	Wojciech Fibak	NED	Tom Okker	2
USA	Pat Dupre	USA	Stan Smith	3
IND	Vijay Amritraj	MEX	Raúl Ramírez	4
