= 1976 Alan King Tennis Classic – Singles =

Singles
- 1976 Alan King Tennis Classic

Final
- Champion: (United States) Jimmy Connors
- Runner-up: (Australia) Ken Rosewall
- Score: 6–1, 6–3

Details
- Draw: 32
- Seeds: 16

Events
Singles	Doubles
← 1975 ·	Alan King Tennis Classic	· 1977 →

Jimmy Connors claimed the title for the first time, defeating Ken Rosewall in the final.

== Seeds ==
1. (United States) Jimmy Connors (champion)
2. (United States) Arthur Ashe (quarterfinals)
3. N/A
4. (Italy) Adriano Panatta (quarterfinals)
5. (United States) Roscoe Tanner (quarterfinals)
6. (Australia) Ken Rosewall (final)
7. (Australia) John Newcombe (second round)
8. (United States) Harold Solomon (second round)
9. (Australia) Ross Case (first round)
10. (United States) Bob Lutz (second round)
11. N/A
12. (United States) Stan Smith (second round)
13. (United States) Brian Gottfried (semifinals)
14. (United States) Dick Stockton (second round)
15. (United States) Tom Gorman (second round)
16. (United States) Cliff Richey (quarterfinals)

== Draw ==
=== Key ===
- Q = Qualifier
- WC = Wild card
- LL = Lucky loser
- Alt = Alternate
- ITF = ITF entry
- PR = Protected ranking
- SR = Special ranking
- SE = Special exempt
- JE = Junior exempt
- JR = Junior Accelerator Programme entrant
- CO = College Accelerator Programme entrant
- NG = Next Gen Accelerator Program entrant
- w/o = Walkover
- r = Retired
- d = Defaulted

=== Finals ===
Semifinals
1	(United States) Jimmy Connors	6	6
(South Africa) Raymond Moore	2	2
6	(Australia) Ken Rosewall	6	3	6
13	(United States) Brian Gottfried	4	6	4

Final
1	(United States) Jimmy Connors	6	6
6	(Australia) Ken Rosewall	1	3

=== Top half ===
First round
1	(United States) J Connors	6	6
(Brazil) T Koch	2	2
(United States) M Riessen	1	4
14	(United States) D Stockton	6	6
16	(United States) C Richey	6	6	6
(United States) J Andrews	7	3	4
(United States) E van Dillen	2	3
7	(Australia) J Newcombe	6	6
5	(United States) R Tanner	6	6	6
(United States) S Stewart	7	2	2
(Australia) B Carmichael	6	6	2
15	(United States) T Gorman	7	4	6
(United States) F Sedgman	1	2
(United States) C Pasarell	6	6
(South Africa) R Moore	6	7
(United States) D Ralston	3	5

Second round
1	(United States) J Connors	6	6
14	(United States) D Stockton	3	3
16	(United States) C Richey	6	6
7	(Australia) J Newcombe	4	4
5	(United States) R Tanner	4	6	7
15	(United States) T Gorman	6	2	6
(United States) C Pasarell	6	5	3
(South Africa) R Moore	2	7	6

Quarterfinals
1	(United States) J Connors	7	6
16	(United States) C Richey	6	2
5	(United States) R Tanner	5	7	4
(South Africa) R Moore	7	6	6

Semifinals
1	(United States) J Connors	6	6
(South Africa) R Moore	2	2

=== Bottom half ===
First round
4	(Italy) A Panatta	6	4	6
(Pakistan) H Rahim	4	6	4
(Australia) G Masters	3	0
10	(United States) B Lutz	6	6
9	(Australia) R Case	6	6
(United States) J Borowiak	7	7
(South Africa) B Hewitt	0	1
6	(Australia) K Rosewall	6	6
8	(United States) H Solomon	6	6
(United States) J McManus	4	0
(United States) D Bohrnstedt	4	6	3
13	(United States) B Gottfried	6	2	6
12	(United States) S Smith	6	7
(Australia) R Emerson	2	6
(India) A Amritraj	5	1
2	(United States) A Ashe	7	6

Second round
4	(Italy) A Panatta	6	3	6
10	(United States) B Lutz	4	6	3
(United States) J Borowiak	0	4
6	(Australia) K Rosewall	6	6
8	(United States) H Solomon	6	4	4
13	(United States) B Gottfried	1	6	6
12	(United States) S Smith	5	6	5
2	(United States) A Ashe	7	3	7

Quarterfinals
4	(Italy) A Panatta	4	3
6	(Australia) K Rosewall	6	6
13	(United States) B Gottfried	7	6
2	(United States) A Ashe	6	2

Semifinals
6	(Australia) K Rosewall	6	3	6
13	(United States) B Gottfried	4	6	4
