= 1976 Alan King Tennis Classic – Doubles =

Doubles
- 1976 Alan King Tennis Classic

Final
- Champions: (United States) Arthur Ashe (United States) Charlie Pasarell
- Runners-up: (United States) Bob Lutz (United States) Stan Smith
- Score: 6–4, 6–2

Events
Singles	Doubles
← 1975 ·	Alan King Tennis Classic	· 1977 →

Fourth-seeded pair Arthur Ashe and Charlie Pasarell won the title, defeating top-seeds Bob Lutz and Stan Smith in the final.

== Draw ==
=== Key ===
- Q = Qualifier
- WC = Wild card
- LL = Lucky loser
- Alt = Alternate
- ITF = ITF entry
- PR = Protected ranking
- SR = Special ranking
- SE = Special exempt
- JE = Junior exempt
- JR = Junior Accelerator Programme entrant
- CO = College Accelerator Programme entrant
- NG = Next Gen Accelerator Program entrant
- w/o = Walkover
- r = Retired
- d = Defaulted

=== Draw ===
First round
1	(United States) B Lutz (United States) S Smith	7	7
(United States) J Andrews (United States) C Richey	5	6
(Australia) L Hoad (United States) J McManus	2	4
(Australia) R Case (Australia) G Masters	6	6
(United States) D Stockton (United States) R Tanner	4	5
(Australia) B Carmichael (Australia) K Rosewall	6	7
(United States) B Gottfried (United States) H Solomon	6	7
3	(Australia) A Emerson (Australia) J Newcombe	4	5
4	(United States) A Ashe (United States) C Pasarell	6	7	6
(United States) D Bohrnstedt (Brazil) T Koch	7	5	3
(United States) T Gorman (United States) S Stewart	3	7	3
(India) V Amritraj (Italy) A Panatta	6	6	6
(United States) P Gonzales (Australia) F Sedgman	1	6	3
(South Africa) B Hewitt (South Africa) R Moore	6	4	6
(United States) B McKinley (United States) V Seixas	3	2
2	(United States) J Connors (United States) E van Dillen	6	6

Quarterfinals
1	(United States) B Lutz (United States) S Smith	6	7
(Australia) R Case (Australia) G Masters	4	5
(Australia) B Carmichael (Australia) K Rosewall	6	7
(United States) B Gottfried (United States) H Solomon	4	6
4	(United States) A Ashe (United States) C Pasarell	7	6
(India) V Amritraj (Italy) A Panatta	6	3
(South Africa) B Hewitt (South Africa) R Moore	6	2
2	(United States) J Connors (United States) E van Dillen	7	6

Semifinals
1	(United States) B Lutz (United States) S Smith	6	6
(Australia) B Carmichael (Australia) K Rosewall	4	2
4	(United States) A Ashe (United States) C Pasarell	6	3	7
2	(United States) J Connors (United States) E van Dillen	4	6	6

Final
1	(United States) B Lutz (United States) S Smith	4	2
4	(United States) A Ashe (United States) C Pasarell	6	6
