= 1980 Birmingham Open – Singles =

Singles
- 1980 Birmingham Open

Final
- Champion: (United States) Jimmy Connors
- Runner-up: (United States) Eliot Teltscher
- Score: 6–3, 6–2

Details
- Draw: 32
- Seeds: 8

Events
Singles	Doubles
← 1979 ·	ATP Birmingham

The 1980 Birmingham Open – Singles was an event of the 1980 Birmingham Open men's tennis tournament that was played in Birmingham, Alabama in the United States from January 14 through January 20, 1980. The draw comprised 32 players and 8 players were seeded. First-seeded Jimmy Connors was the defending singles champion and successfully defended his title, defeating Eliot Teltscher in the final, 6–3, 6–2.

== Seeds ==
1. (United States) Jimmy Connors (champion)
2. (United States) Vitas Gerulaitis (quarterfinals)
3. N/A
4. N/A
5. (United States) Eddie Dibbs (quarterfinals)
6. (United States) Peter Fleming (semifinals)
7. (Poland) Wojtek Fibak (second round)
8. (Argentina) José Luis Clerc (quarterfinals)

== Draw ==
=== Key ===
- Q = Qualifier
- WC = Wild card
- LL = Lucky loser
- Alt = Alternate
- SE = Special exempt
- PR = Protected ranking
- ITF = ITF entry
- JE = Junior exempt
- w/o = Walkover
- r = Retired
- d = Defaulted
- SR = Special ranking

=== Finals ===
Semifinals
1	(United States) Jimmy Connors	6	6
(United States) Butch Walts	3	3
(United States) Eliot Teltscher	7	0
(India) Vijay Amritraj	6	0^{r}

Final
1	(United States) Jimmy Connors	6	6
(United States) Eliot Teltscher	3	2

=== Top half ===
First round
1	(United States) J Connors	7	6
(France) Y Noah	6	4
(United States) C Owens	6	5
(Hungary) B Taróczy	7	7
(Zimbabwe) A Pattison	6	7
(United States) M Cahill	0	5
(United States) B Martin	2	3
5	(United States) E Dibbs	6	6
LL	(United States) T Garcia	1	4
(Romania) I Năstase	6	6
(United States) J Kriek	6	6
Q	(United States) J Bailey	2	0
(United States) B Walts	6	6
(Netherlands) T Okker	4	4
(Switzerland) H Gunthardt	6	5	3
7	(Poland) W Fibak	2	7	6

Second round
1	(United States) J Connors	6	6	6
(Hungary) B Taróczy	7	0	4
(Zimbabwe) A Pattison	3	1
5	(United States) E Dibbs	6	6
(Romania) I Năstase	6	3	6
(United States) J Kriek	4	6	3
(United States) B Walts	7	7
7	(Poland) W Fibak	5	6

Quarterfinals
1	(United States) J Connors	6	6
5	(United States) E Dibbs	2	2
(Romania) I Năstase	3	4
(United States) B Walts	6	6

Semifinals
1	(United States) J Connors	6	6
(United States) B Walts	3	3

=== Bottom half ===
First round
8	(Argentina) J L Clerc	6	3	4
(United States) S Smith	2	6	6
(United States) V V Patten	5	5
(United Kingdom) B Mottram	7	7
Q	(United States) D Dowlen	1	3
(United States) E Teltscher	6	6
(Mexico) R Ramírez	6	7
LL	(United States) M Diaz	3	5
6	(United States) P Fleming	7	6
(United States) R Fagel	6	1
(India) V Amritraj	6	6
(United States) P DuPré	3	4
(United States) B Scanlon	6	7
(United States) T Moor	4	6
(India) A Amritraj	3	3
2	(United States) V Gerulaitis	6	6

Second round
(United States) S Smith	3	6	6
(United Kingdom) B Mottram	6	4	7
(United States) E Teltscher	6	6
(Mexico) R Ramírez	0	1
6	(United States) P Fleming	3	6
(India) V Amritraj	6	7
(United States) B Scanlon	6	2	3
2	(United States) V Gerulaitis	4	6	6

Quarterfinals
(United Kingdom) B Mottram	6	3
(United States) E Teltscher	7	6
(India) V Amritraj	6	0	6
2	(United States) V Gerulaitis	1	6	4

Semifinals
(United States) E Teltscher	7	0
(India) V Amritraj	6	0^{r}
