= 1978 U.S. National Indoor Championships =

- Date: February 27 – March 5
- Edition: 9th
- Category: Grand Prix
- Draw: 32S / 16D
- Prize money: $225,000
- Surface: Carpet / Indoor
- Location: Memphis, TN, United States
- Venue: Racquet Club of Memphis

Champions

Singles
- (United States) Jimmy Connors

Doubles
- (Mexico) Raúl Ramírez / (United States) Brian Gottfried
- U.S. National Indoor Championships

The 1978 U.S. National Indoor Championships was a men's tennis tournament played on indoor carpet courts at the Racquet Club of Memphis in Memphis, Tennessee in the United States that was part of the 1978 Colgate-Palmolive Grand Prix. It was the ninth edition of the tournament was held from February 27 through March 5, 1978. First-seeded Jimmy Connors won the singles title and $39,000 first-prize money. It was Connors' fourth title at the event after his three successive titles from 1973 to 1975, when the tournament was held in Salisbury, Maryland.

== Finals ==
=== Singles ===
(United States) Jimmy Connors defeated (United States) Tim Gullikson 7–6, 6–3

- It was Connors' third singles title of the year and the 64th of his career.

=== Doubles ===
(Mexico) Raúl Ramírez / (United States) Brian Gottfried defeated (Australia) Phil Dent / (Australia) John Newcombe 3–6, 7–6, 6–2

== See also ==
- 1978 US Indoor Championships – women's tournament
