= 1978 Alan King Tennis Classic – Singles =

Singles
- 1978 Alan King Tennis Classic

Final
- Champion: (United States) Harold Solomon
- Runner-up: (Italy) Corrado Barazzutti
- Score: 6–1, 3–0 ret.

Details
- Draw: 32
- Seeds: 8

Events
Singles	Doubles
← 1977 ·	Alan King Tennis Classic	· 1979 →

Jimmy Connors was the defending champion but lost in the second round to Hank Pfister. Sixth-seeded Harold Solomon claimed the title after Corrado Barazzutti retired from the final due to food poisoning.

== Seeds ==
1. (United States) Jimmy Connors (second round)
2. (United States) Brian Gottfried (quarterfinals)
3. (Mexico) Raúl Ramírez (semifinals)
4. (Italy) Corrado Barazzutti (final)
5. (United States) Roscoe Tanner (quarterfinals)
6. (United States) Harold Solomon (champion)
7. (Romania) Ilie Năstase (first round)
8. (United States) John McEnroe (second round)

== Draw ==
=== Key ===
- Q = Qualifier
- WC = Wild card
- LL = Lucky loser
- Alt = Alternate
- SE = Special exempt
- PR = Protected ranking
- ITF = ITF entry
- JE = Junior exempt
- w/o = Walkover
- r = Retired
- d = Defaulted
- SR = Special ranking

=== Finals ===
Semifinals
(United States) Hank Pfister	2	6	2
4	(Italy) Corrado Barazzutti	6	4	6
3	(Mexico) Raúl Ramírez	6	4	3
6	(United States) Harold Solomon	3	6	6

Final
4	(Italy) Corrado Barazzutti	1	0^{r}
6	(United States) Harold Solomon	6	3

=== Top half ===
First round
1	(United States) J Connors	6	6
Q	(United States) C Hagey	2	3
(United States) A Ashe	4	5
(United States) H Pfister	6	7
(Poland) W Fibak	6	6	6
(United States) P Fleming	3	7	3
(South Africa) B Hewitt	5	3
5	(United States) R Tanner	7	6
4	(Italy) C Barazzutti	6	7
(Socialist Federal Republic of Yugoslavia) Ž Franulović	2	6
(United States) C Pasarell	0	1
(United States) B Lutz	6	6
(Australia) J Newcombe	6	6
Q	(United States) Guy Fritz	2	3
(Chile) J Fillol	0	6	3
8	(United States) J McEnroe	6	2	6

Second round
1	(United States) J Connors	6	6	4
(United States) H Pfister	7	3	6
(Poland) W Fibak	1	6	4
5	(United States) R Tanner	6	4	6
4	(Italy) C Barazzutti	6	4	7
(United States) B Lutz	2	6	6
(Australia) J Newcombe	1	6	6
8	(United States) J McEnroe	6	2	3

Quarterfinals
(United States) H Pfister	7	6	6
5	(United States) R Tanner	6	7	2
4	(Italy) C Barazzutti	7	3	6
(Australia) J Newcombe	6	6	4

Semifinals
(United States) H Pfister	2	6	2
4	(Italy) C Barazzutti	6	4	6

=== Bottom half ===
First round
7	(Romania) I Năstase	6	6	4
(Australia) K Warwick	3	7	6
(United Kingdom) J Lloyd	6	6
(United States) J Borowiak	2	2
Q	(Australia) P Kronk	4	3
(Australia) K Rosewall	6	6
(United States) T Leonard	3	4
3	(Mexico) R Ramírez	6	6
6	(United States) H Solomon	6	2	6
(United States) T Gullikson	4	6	3
(United States) S Carnahan	2	2
(Australia) P Dent	6	6
(Netherlands) T Okker	5	6	4
(Australia) C Dibley	7	3	6
Q	(United States) M Cahill	4	5
2	(United States) B Gottfried	6	7

Second round
(Australia) K Warwick	6	6
(United Kingdom) J Lloyd	4	2
(Australia) K Rosewall	4	1
3	(Mexico) R Ramírez	6	6
6	(United States) H Solomon	6	6	6
(Australia) P Dent	7	1	2
(Australia) C Dibley	4	6
2	(United States) B Gottfried	6	7

Quarterfinals
(Australia) K Warwick	3	3
3	(Mexico) R Ramírez	6	6
6	(United States) H Solomon	7	6
2	(United States) B Gottfried	6	4

Semifinals
3	(Mexico) R Ramírez	6	4	3
6	(United States) H Solomon	3	6	6
