= 1984 Stockholm Open =

- Date: 29 October – 5 November
- Edition: 16th
- Category: Grand Prix circuit
- Draw: 48S / 24D
- Prize money: $250,000
- Surface: Hard / indoor
- Location: Stockholm, Sweden
- Venue: Kungliga tennishallen

Champions

Singles
- (United States) John McEnroe

Doubles
- (France) Henri Leconte / (Czechoslovakia) Tomáš Šmíd
- Stockholm Open

The 1984 Stockholm Open was a men's tennis tournament played on indoor hard courts and part of the 1984 Volvo Grand Prix and took place at the Kungliga tennishallen in Stockholm, Sweden. It was the 16th edition of the tournament and was held from 29 October through 5 November 1984. First-seeded John McEnroe won the singles title, his third at the event after 1978 and 1979, and earned $45,000 first-prize money.

== Finals ==
=== Singles ===
(United States) John McEnroe defeated (Sweden) Mats Wilander, 6–2, 3–6, 6–2

- It was McEnroe's 12th singles title of the year and the 58th of his career.

=== Doubles ===
(France) Henri Leconte / (Czechoslovakia) Tomáš Šmíd defeated (India) Vijay Amritraj / (Romania) Ilie Năstase, 3–6, 7–6, 6–4
