= 1978 Washington Star International =

- Date: July 17–23
- Edition: 10th
- Category: Grand Prix
- Draw: 64S / 32D
- Prize money: $175,000
- Surface: Clay / outdoor
- Location: Washington, D.C., United States

Champions

Singles
- (United States) Jimmy Connors

Doubles
- (United States) Arthur Ashe / (South Africa) Bob Hewitt
- Washington Open

The 1978 Washington Star International was a men's tennis tournament and was played on outdoor clay courts. The event was part of the 1978 Grand Prix circuit. It was the 10th edition of the tournament and was held in Washington, D.C. from July 17 through July 23, 1978. First-seeded Jimmy Connors won his second singles title at the event after 1976.

== Finals ==
=== Singles ===
(United States) Jimmy Connors defeated (United States) Eddie Dibbs 7–5, 7–5

- It was Connors' 6th singles title of the year and the 67th of his career.

=== Doubles ===
(United States) Arthur Ashe / (South Africa) Bob Hewitt defeated (United States) Fred McNair / (Mexico) Raúl Ramírez 6–3, 6–3
