= 1978 U.S. Pro Indoor – Singles =

Singles
- 1978 U.S. Pro Indoor

Final
- Champion: (United States) Jimmy Connors
- Runner-up: (United States) Roscoe Tanner
- Score: 6–2, 6–4, 6–3

Details
- Draw: 48
- Seeds: 16

Events
Singles	Doubles
← 1977 ·	U.S. Pro Indoor	· 1979 →

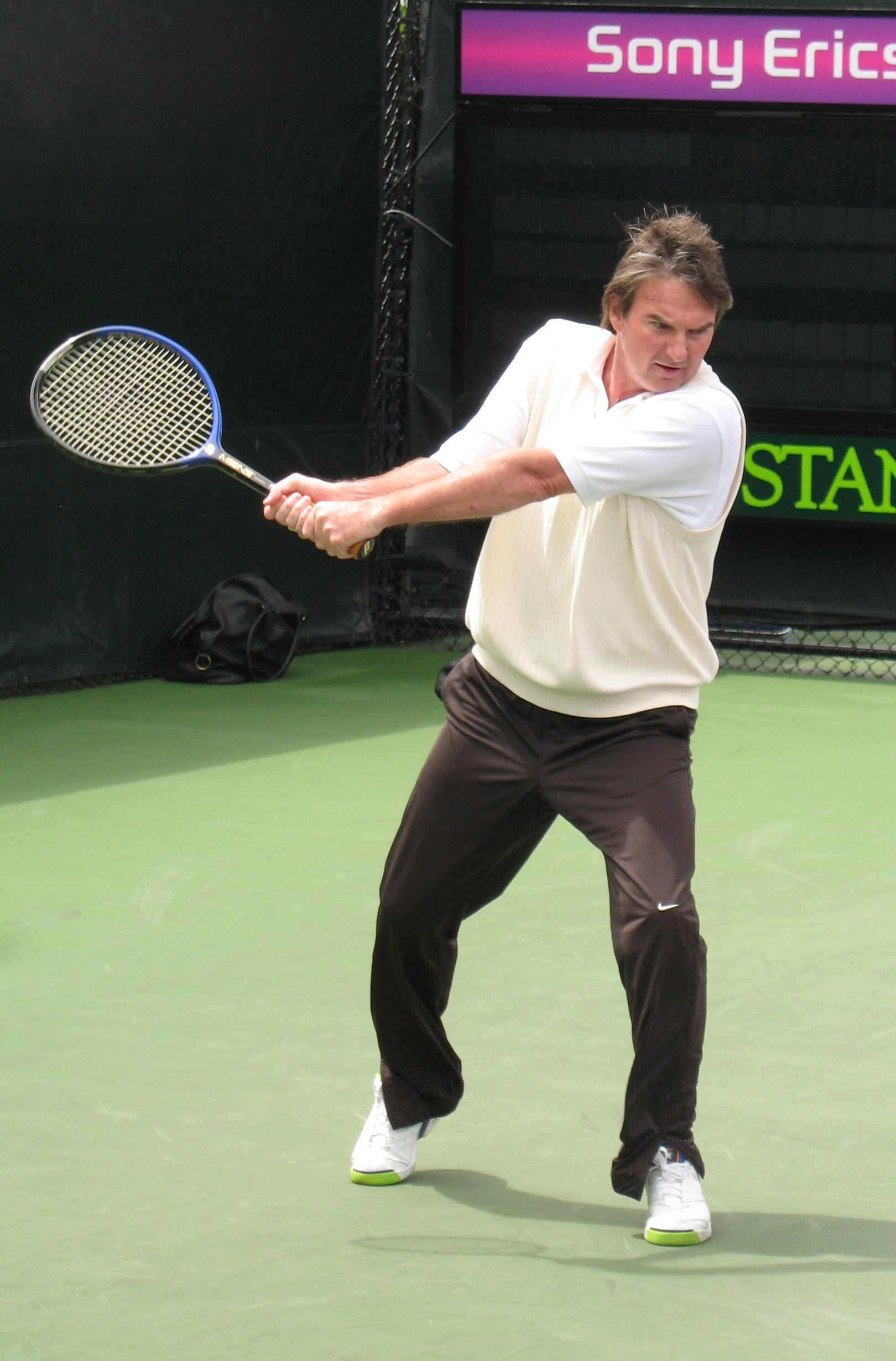
Jimmy Connors, the 1978 winner

Dick Stockton was the defending champion, but lost in the first round.

Jimmy Connors won the title, defeating Roscoe Tanner, 6–2, 6–4, 6–3 in the final.

== Seeds ==
1. (United States) Jimmy Connors (champion)
2. (Sweden) Björn Borg (quarterfinals)
3. (United States) Brian Gottfried (semifinals)
4. (United States) Vitas Gerulaitis (third round)
5. (Spain) Manuel Orantes (third round)
6. (United States) Eddie Dibbs (semifinals)
7. (Mexico) Raúl Ramírez (quarterfinals)
8. (Romania) Ilie Năstase (third round)
9. (United States) Dick Stockton (first round)
10. (United States) Roscoe Tanner (final)
11. (Italy) Corrado Barazzutti (first round)
12. (Australia) Ken Rosewall (third round)
13. (Poland) Wojtek Fibak (third round)
14. (United States) Harold Solomon (third round)
15. (United States) Sandy Mayer (quarterfinals)
16. (United States) John McEnroe (quarterfinals)

== Draw ==
=== Key ===
- Q = Qualifier
- WC = Wild card
- LL = Lucky loser
- Alt = Alternate
- SE = Special exempt
- PR = Protected ranking
- ITF = ITF entry
- JE = Junior exempt
- w/o = Walkover
- r = Retired
- d = Defaulted
- SR = Special ranking

=== Finals ===
Semifinals
1	(United States) Jimmy Connors	3	4	6	6	6
3	(United States) Brian Gottfried	6	6	3	2	0
6	(United States) Eddie Dibbs	6	7	4	1
10	(United States) Roscoe Tanner	7	5	6	6

Final
1	(United States) Jimmy Connors	6	6	6
10	(United States) Roscoe Tanner	2	4	3

=== Top half ===
==== Section 1 ====
First round
1	(United States) J Connors	7	6
(South Africa) C Drysdale	6	0
(United States) Ti Gullikson	3	7	6
9	(United States) D Stockton	6	6	4
(Australia) D Crealy	4	4
(Hungary) B Taróczy	6	6
(South Africa) R Moore	6	6
(Czechoslovakia) J Hřebec	4	4

Second round
1	(United States) J Connors	6	6
(Italy) A Panatta	3	2
(United Kingdom) B Mottram	1	6	6
(United States) Ti Gullikson	6	3	2
12	(Australia) K Rosewall	7	6
(Hungary) B Taróczy	5	3
(South Africa) R Moore	4	6
7	(Mexico) R Ramírez	6	7

Third round
1	(United States) J Connors	6	6
(United Kingdom) B Mottram	1	4
12	(Australia) K Rosewall	4	2
7	(Mexico) R Ramírez	6	6

Quarterfinals
1	(United States) J Connors	6	6	6
7	(Mexico) R Ramírez	7	2	1

==== Section 2 ====
First round
(United States) M Riessen	7	6	6
(Australia) J Alexander	6	7	3
Q	(United States) J McManus	6	1	2
WC	(United States) V Winitsky	3	6	6
16	(United States) J McEnroe	6	6
(United States) B Walts	3	2
(United States) R Meyer	2	1
5	(Spain) M Orantes	6	6

Second round
3	(United States) B Gottfried	6	6
(United States) M Riessen	3	4
WC	(United States) V Winitsky	4	0
13	(Poland) W Fibak	6	6
16	(United States) J McEnroe	6	3	7
(United States) To Gullikson	4	6	6
WC	(South Africa) F McMillan	4	5
5	(Spain) M Orantes	6	7

Third round
3	(United States) B Gottfried	6	7
13	(Poland) W Fibak	3	6
16	(United States) J McEnroe	7	6
5	(Spain) M Orantes	6	2

Quarterfinals
3	(United States) B Gottfried	6	6
16	(United States) J McEnroe	1	3

=== Bottom half ===
==== Section 3 ====
First round
6	(United States) E Dibbs	6	6
(South Africa) B Hewitt	2	1
(Italy) A Zugarelli	7	6
(United States) H Pfister	6	3
15	(United States) S Mayer	6	4	6
(Czechoslovakia) J Kodeš	2	6	2
(United States) M Fishbach	2	0
4	(United States) V Gerulaitis	6	6

Second round
6	(United States) E Dibbs	7	6
(United States) T Moor	6	3
(Italy) A Zugarelli	2	4
14	(United States) H Solomon	6	6
15	(United States) S Mayer	6	6
(Australia) R Case	1	1
(United States) J Borowiak	1	1
4	(United States) V Gerulaitis	6	6

Third round
6	(United States) E Dibbs	6	6
14	(United States) H Solomon	3	2
15	(United States) S Mayer	6	7
4	(United States) V Gerulaitis	2	5

Quarterfinals
6	(United States) E Dibbs	7	3	6
15	(United States) S Mayer	6	6	4

==== Section 4 ====
First round
(United Kingdom) M Cox	7	7
Q	(United States) T Leonard	6	6
(Australia) S Ball	2	4
10	(United States) R Tanner	6	6
11	(Italy) C Barazzutti	3	7	1
(United States) P Fleming	6	6	6
(Netherlands) T Okker	2	6	6
(United States) B Scanlon	6	4	2

Second round
8	(Romania) I Năstase	7	6
(United Kingdom) M Cox	5	2
(Socialist Federal Republic of Yugoslavia) Ž Franulović	6	4
10	(United States) R Tanner	7	6
(United States) P Fleming	6	7
(United States) M Cahill	3	6
(Netherlands) T Okker	2	1
2	(Sweden) B Borg	6	6

Third round
8	(Romania) I Năstase	1	7	0
10	(United States) R Tanner	6	6	6
(United States) P Fleming	6	6	3
2	(Sweden) B Borg	3	7	6

Quarterfinals
10	(United States) R Tanner	6	7
2	(Sweden) B Borg	4	6
