= 1976 Benson & Hedges Championships =

- Date: 15–21 November
- Edition: 1st
- Category: Grand Prix (Four star)
- Draw: 32S / 16D
- Prize money: $125,000
- Surface: Carpet / indoor
- Location: London, England
- Venue: Wembley Arena

Champions

Singles
- (United States) Jimmy Connors

Doubles
- (United States) Roscoe Tanner / (United States) Stan Smith
- Wembley Championships

The 1976 Benson & Hedges Championships, also known as the Wembley Championships, was a men's tennis tournament played on indoor carpet courts at the Wembley Arena in London in England that was part of the 1976 Commercial Union Assurance Grand Prix circuit and categorized as a Four Star event. The tournament was held from 15 November through 21 November 1976. On request of first-seeded Jimmy Connors, citing doctor's advice on his back and ankle injuries, the final was rescheduled from a best-of-five to a best-of-three set format. At 4-all in the second set Connors survived 0-40 and five breakpoints in total to eventually claim the singles title and the accompanying £12,500 first-prize money.

== Finals ==
=== Singles ===
(United States) Jimmy Connors defeated (United States) Roscoe Tanner 3–6, 7–6^{(8–6)}, 6–4

- It was Connors' 12th singles title of the year and the 53rd of his career.

=== Doubles ===
(United States) Roscoe Tanner / (United States) Stan Smith defeated (Poland) Wojtek Fibak / (United States) Brian Gottfried 7–6, 6–3
