= 1978 U.S. Pro Indoor =

- Date: January 23–29
- Edition: 11th
- Category: Grand Prix (WCT)
- Draw: 64S / 32D
- Prize money: $225,000
- Surface: Carpet / indoor
- Location: Philadelphia, PA, U.S.
- Venue: Spectrum

Champions

Singles
- (United States) Jimmy Connors

Doubles
- (South Africa) Bob Hewitt / (South Africa) Frew McMillan
| ← 1977 · | U.S. Pro Indoor | · 1979 → |

The 1978 U.S. Pro Indoor was a men's tennis tournament played on indoor carpet courta at the Spectrum in Philadelphia, Pennsylvania in the United States. The tournament was organized by the World Championship Tennis (WCT) and was part of the 1978 Colgate-Palmolive Grand Prix circuit. It was the 11th edition of the tournament and was held from January 23 through January 29, 1978. First-seeded Jimmy Connors won the singles title and the accompanying $35,000 first-prize money.

== Finals ==
=== Singles ===
(United States) Jimmy Connors defeated (United States) Roscoe Tanner 6–2, 6–4, 6–3

- It was Connors' 1st title of the year and the 75th of his career.

=== Doubles ===
(South Africa) Bob Hewitt / (South Africa) Frew McMillan defeated (United States) Vitas Gerulaitis / (United States) Sandy Mayer 6–4, 6–4

- It was Hewitt's 1st title of the year and the 45th of his career. It was McMillan's 1st title of the year and the 50th of his career.

== Points and prize money ==
=== Point distribution ===
| Event | | W | F | SF | QF | Round of 16 | Round of 32 | Round of 64 |
| Singles | WCT | 220 | 180 | 140 | 100 | 60 | 20 | 10 |
| Singles | Grand Prix | 225 | 157 | 90 | 45 | 22 | 11 | – |
| Doubles | WCT | 220 | 180 | 140 | 100 | 60 | 20 | – |
| Doubles | Grand Prix | 45 | 31 | 18 | 9 | 5 | – | – |

=== Prize money ===
| Event | W | F | SF | QF | Round of 16 | Round of 32 | Round of 64 |
| Singles | $34,000 | $17,000 | $8,512 | $5,000 | $3,000 | $1,600 | $862 |
| Doubles | $11,500 | $5,800 | $3,512 | $1,600 | $750 | $387 | – |
