= 1979 U.S. Pro Indoor =

- Date: January 22–28
- Edition: 12th
- Category: Grand Prix circuit (WCT)
- Draw: 48S / 24D
- Prize money: $250,000
- Surface: Carpet / indoor
- Location: Philadelphia, PA, U.S.
- Venue: Spectrum

Champions

Singles
- (United States) Jimmy Connors

Doubles
- (Poland) Wojciech Fibak / (Netherlands) Tom Okker
- U.S. Pro Indoor

The 1979 U.S. Pro Indoor was an American men's tennis tournament played at the Spectrum in Philadelphia, Pennsylvania, from January 22 to January 28 on indoor carpet courts as part of the 1979 Colgate-Palmolive Grand Prix. First-seeded Jimmy Connors won his second consecutive singles title. Wojciech Fibak and Tom Okker won the doubles.

== Finals ==
=== Singles ===
(United States) Jimmy Connors defeated (United States) Arthur Ashe 6–3, 6–4, 6–1

- It was Connors' 2nd singles title of the year and the 73rd of his career.

=== Doubles ===
(Poland) Wojciech Fibak / (Netherlands) Tom Okker defeated (United States) Peter Fleming / (United States) John McEnroe 5–7, 6–1, 6–3

- It was Fibak's 1st title of the year and the 39th of his career. It was Okker's 1st title of the year and the 72nd of his career.
