= 1975 Birmingham International =

- Date: January 20–26
- Edition: 3rd
- Category: USLTA Indoor Circuit
- Draw: 26S / 13D
- Prize money: $25,000
- Surface: Carpet / indoor
- Location: Birmingham, Alabama, U.S.
- Venue: Birmingham Municipal Auditorium

Champions

Singles
- (United States) Jimmy Connors

Doubles
- (West Germany) Jürgen Fassbender / (West Germany) Karl Meiler
← 1974 ·	ATP Birmingham	· 1976 →

The 1975 Birmingham International was a men's tennis tournament played on indoor carpet courts at the Birmingham Municipal Auditorium in Birmingham, Alabama, in the United States that was part of the 1975 USLTA Indoor Circuit. It was the third edition of the event and was held from January 20 through January 26, 1975. Top-seeded Jimmy Connors won his second consecutive singles title at the event and earned $5,000 first-prize money.

== Finals ==
=== Singles ===
(United States) Jimmy Connors defeated (United States) Billy Martin 6–4, 6–3

- It was Connors' 2nd singles title of the year and the 34th of his career.

=== Doubles ===
(West Germany) Jürgen Fassbender / (West Germany) Karl Meiler defeated (Rhodesia) Colin Dowdeswell / (South Africa) John Yuill 6–1, 3–6, 7–6
