= 1983 Union 76 Pacific Southwest Open =

- Date: April 11–17
- Edition: 57th
- Category: Grand Prix
- Draw: 48S / 24D
- Prize money: $200,000
- Surface: Hard / outdoor
- Location: Los Angeles, California, U.S.
- Venue: Los Angeles Tennis Club

Champions

Singles
- (United States) Gene Mayer

Doubles
- (United States) Peter Fleming / (United States) John McEnroe
← 1982 ·	Pacific Southwest Open	· 1984 →

The 1983 Union 76 Pacific Southwest Open was a men's tennis tournament played on outdoor hard courts at the Los Angeles Tennis Club in Los Angeles, California in the United States. The event was part of the 1983 Volvo Grand Prix circuit. It was the 57th edition of the Pacific Southwest tournament and was scheduled to be held from April 11 through April 17, 1983 but due to rain the final was postponed until Monday, April 18. Second-seeded Gene Mayer won the singles title and the corresponding $36,000 first-prize money.

== Finals ==
=== Singles ===
(United States) Gene Mayer defeated (United States) Johan Kriek 7–6, 6–1

- It was Mayer's 2nd singles title of the year and the 14th and last of his career.

=== Doubles ===
(United States) Peter Fleming / (United States) John McEnroe defeated (United States) Sandy Mayer / (United States) Ferdi Taygan 6–1, 6–2
