= 1977 Alan King Tennis Classic – Singles =

Singles
- 1977 Alan King Tennis Classic

Final
- Champion: (United States) Jimmy Connors
- Runner-up: (Mexico) Raúl Ramírez
- Score: 6–4, 5–7, 6–2

Details
- Draw: 32
- Seeds: 16

Events
Singles	Doubles
← 1976 ·	Alan King Tennis Classic	· 1978 →

First-seeded Jimmy Connors retained his title, defeating second-seeded Raúl Ramírez in the final.

== Seeds ==
1. (United States) Jimmy Connors (champion)
2. (Mexico) Raúl Ramírez (final)
3. (United States) Roscoe Tanner (first round)
4. (Italy) Adriano Panatta (first round)
5. (Australia) Ken Rosewall (second round)
6. (United Kingdom) Mark Cox (first round)
7. (United States) Stan Smith (quarterfinals)
8. (United States) Bob Lutz (second round)
9. (South Africa) Cliff Drysdale (second round)
10. (Chile) Jaime Fillol (quarterfinals)
11. (United States) Cliff Richey (first round)
12. (Australia) John Alexander (quarterfinals)
13. (Australia) Phil Dent (first round)
14. (United States) Bill Scanlon (second round)
15. (New Zealand) Brian Fairlie (first round)
16. (India) Vijay Amritraj (first round)

== Draw ==
=== Key ===
- Q = Qualifier
- WC = Wild card
- LL = Lucky loser
- Alt = Alternate
- ITF = ITF entry
- PR = Protected ranking
- SR = Special ranking
- SE = Special exempt
- JE = Junior exempt
- JR = Junior Accelerator Programme entrant
- CO = College Accelerator Programme entrant
- NG = Next Gen Accelerator Program entrant
- w/o = Walkover
- r = Retired
- d = Defaulted

=== Finals ===
Semifinals
1	(United States) Jimmy Connors	6	7
(South Africa) Bob Hewitt	3	5
(Australia) Colin Dibley	4	6
2	(Mexico) Raúl Ramírez	6	7

Final
1	(United States) Jimmy Connors	6	5	6
2	(Mexico) Raúl Ramírez	4	7	2

=== Top half ===
First round
1	(United States) J Connors	6	5	6
(Sweden) O Bengtson	2	7	2
(United States) T Gullikson	6	7
16	(India) V Amritraj	4	6
9	(South Africa) C Drysdale	6	2	6
(New Zealand) O Parun	3	6	3
(South Africa) B Mitton	6	3	1
7	(United States) S Smith	4	6	6
5	(Australia) K Rosewall	6	7
(United States) C Pasarell	4	6
(South Africa) R Moore	4	2
12	(Australia) J Alexander	6	6
13	(Australia) P Dent	6	4	5
(South Africa) B Hewitt	2	6	7
(Australia) M Edmondson	4	6	6
3	(United States) R Tanner	6	4	3

Second round
1	(United States) J Connors	6	6
(United States) T Gullikson	4	2
9	(South Africa) C Drysdale	7	5	0
7	(United States) S Smith	6	7	6
5	(Australia) K Rosewall	6	5	3
12	(Australia) J Alexander	3	7	6
(South Africa) B Hewitt	6	6
(Australia) M Edmondson	4	1

Quarterfinals
1	(United States) J Connors	6	6
7	(United States) S Smith	1	3
12	(Australia) J Alexander	4	7	2
(South Africa) B Hewitt	6	6	6

Semifinals
1	(United States) J Connors	6	7
(South Africa) B Hewitt	3	5

=== Bottom half ===
First round
4	(Italy) A Panatta	3	3
(United States) M Riessen	6	6
(Rhodesia) A Pattison	4	4
14	(United States) B Scanlon	6	6
11	(United States) C Richey	3	6	4
(Australia) C Dibley	6	2	6
(Australia) R Laver	6	6
6	(United Kingdom) M Cox	2	3
8	(United States) B Lutz	6	6
(United States) B Martin	1	3
(Australia) G Masters	3	6
10	(Chile) J Fillol	6	7
15	(New Zealand) B Fairlie	3	3
(United States) B Teacher	6	6
(United States) J Borowiak	4	1
2	(Mexico) R Ramírez	6	6

Second round
(United States) M Riessen	7	7
14	(United States) B Scanlon	6	6
(Australia) C Dibley	6	3	6
(Australia) R Laver	4	6	2
8	(United States) B Lutz	6	1
10	(Chile) J Fillol	6	7
(United States) B Teacher	7	6	3
2	(Mexico) R Ramírez	6	7	6

Quarterfinals
(United States) M Riessen	2	6	6
(Australia) C Dibley	6	4	7
10	(Chile) J Fillol	4	2
2	(Mexico) R Ramírez	6	6

Semifinals
(Australia) C Dibley	4	6
2	(Mexico) R Ramírez	6	7
