= 1980 Birmingham Open – Doubles =

Doubles
- 1980 Birmingham Open

Final
- Champions: (Poland) Wojciech Fibak (Netherlands) Tom Okker
- Runners-up: (Argentina) José Luis Clerc (Romania) Ilie Nastase
- Score: 6–3, 6–3

Events
Singles	Doubles
← 1979 ·	ATP Birmingham

Stan Smith and Dick Stockton were the defending champions, but Stockton did not participate this year. Smith partnered Pat Dupre, losing in the quarterfinals.

Wojciech Fibak and Tom Okker won the title after defeating José Luis Clerc and Ilie Nastase in the final, 6–3, 6–2.

== Seeds ==
1. (United States) Peter Fleming / (Switzerland) Heinz Gunthardt (first round)
2. (Poland) Wojciech Fibak / (Netherlands) Tom Okker (champions)
3. (United States) Pat Dupre / (United States) Stan Smith (quarterfinals)
4. (India) Vijay Amritraj / (Mexico) Raúl Ramírez (quarterfinals)

== Draw ==
=== Key ===
- Q = Qualifier
- WC = Wild card
- LL = Lucky loser
- Alt = Alternate
- SE = Special exempt
- PR = Protected ranking
- ITF = ITF entry
- JE = Junior exempt
- w/o = Walkover
- r = Retired
- d = Defaulted
- SR = Special ranking

First round
1	(United States) P Fleming (Switzerland) H Gunthardt	4	6	5
(United States) B Martin (United States) E Teltscher	6	2	7
(Argentina) J L Clerc (Romania) I Nastase	7	7
(United States) E Dibbs (France) Y Noah	5	6
3	(United States) P Dupre (United States) S Smith	6	6
(United States) D Dowlen (United States) B Nichols	1	1
(United States) J Bailey (United States) C Owens	6	3	4
(United States) T Moor (Hungary) B Taróczy	4	6	6
(United States) M Cahill (United Kingdom) B Mottram	7	6
(United States) S Denton (United States) J Turpin	6	4
(India) A Amritraj (United States) J Kriek	4	5
4	(India) V Amritraj (Mexico) R Ramírez	6	7
(United States) R Fagel (United States) T Garcia	3	6	6
(United States) B Scanlon (United States) V Van Patten	6	4	3
(Zimbabwe) A Pattison (United States) B Walts	6	4
2	(Poland) W Fibak (Netherlands) T Okker	7	6

Quarterfinals
(United States) B Martin (United States) E Teltscher	3	6	2
(Argentina) J L Clerc (Romania) I Nastase	6	4	6
3	(United States) P Dupre (United States) S Smith	3	3
(United States) T Moor (Hungary) B Taróczy	6	6
(United States) M Cahill (United Kingdom) B Mottram	1	6	6
4	(India) V Amritraj (Mexico) R Ramírez	6	3	4
(United States) R Fagel (United States) T Garcia	1	1
2	(Poland) W Fibak (Netherlands) T Okker	6	6

Semifinals
(Argentina) J L Clerc (Romania) I Nastase	6	6
(United States) T Moor (Hungary) B Taróczy	3	2
(United States) M Cahill (United Kingdom) B Mottram	2	6
2	(Poland) W Fibak (Netherlands) T Okker	6	7

Final
(Argentina) J L Clerc (Romania) I Nastase	3	3
2	(Poland) W Fibak (Netherlands) T Okker	6	6
