= 1984 Stockholm Open – Doubles =

Doubles
- 1984 Stockholm Open

Final
- Champions: (France) Henri Leconte (Czechoslovakia) Tomáš Šmíd
- Runners-up: (India) Vijay Amritraj (Romania) Ilie Năstase
- Score: 3–6, 7–6, 6–4

Events
Singles	Doubles
← 1983 ·	Stockholm Open	· 1985 →

Anders Järryd and Hans Simonsson were the defending champions, but did not partner together this year. Järryd partnered Stefan Edberg, losing in the quarterfinals. Simsonsson partnered Cássio Motta, losing in the quarterfinals.

Henri Leconte and Tomáš Šmíd won the title, defeating Vijay Amritraj and Ilie Năstase 3–6, 7–6, 6–4 in the final.

== Seeds ==
All seeds receive a bye into the second round.

1. (United States) Peter Fleming / (United States) John McEnroe (second round)
2. (United States) Steve Denton / (United States) Sherwood Stewart (second round)
3. (France) Henri Leconte / (Czechoslovakia) Tomáš Šmíd (champions)
4. (Sweden) Stefan Edberg / (Sweden) Anders Järryd (quarterfinals)
5. (Switzerland) Heinz Günthardt / (Hungary) Balázs Taróczy (semifinals)
6. (Poland) Wojtek Fibak / (United States) Sandy Mayer (quarterfinals, withdrew)
7. (United States) Gary Donnelly / (United States) Butch Walts (quarterfinals)
8. (Sweden) Jan Gunnarsson / (Denmark) Michael Mortensen (semifinals)

== Draw ==
=== Key ===
- Q = Qualifier
- WC = Wild card
- LL = Lucky loser
- Alt = Alternate
- SE = Special exempt
- PR = Protected ranking
- ITF = ITF entry
- JE = Junior exempt
- w/o = Walkover
- r = Retired
- d = Defaulted
- SR = Special ranking

=== Finals ===
Semifinals
(India) Vijay Amritraj (Romania) Ilie Năstase	7	7
5	(Switzerland) Heinz Günthardt (Hungary) Balázs Taróczy	6	5
3	(France) Henri Leconte (Czechoslovakia) Tomáš Šmíd	6	6
8	(Sweden) Jan Gunnarsson (Denmark) Michael Mortensen	4	3

Final
(India) Vijay Amritraj (Romania) Ilie Năstase	6	6	4
3	(France) Henri Leconte (Czechoslovakia) Tomáš Šmíd	3	7	6

=== Top half ===
First round
(Sweden) R Båthman (Sweden) S Svensson	7	2	4
(India) V Amritraj (Romania) I Năstase	6	6	6
(United States) M Flur (Israel) S Perkiss	4	6
(United States) V Gerulaitis (South Africa) J Kriek	6	7
(Sweden) P Hjertquist (Sweden) H Simonsson	4	6	6
(Sweden) J Nyström (Sweden) M Wilander	6	1	7
(Brazil) A Hocevar (Brazil) M Hocevar	7	6
(Sweden) J Carlsson (Sweden) P Svensson	6	1

Second round
1	(United States) P Fleming (United States) J McEnroe	6	6	3
(India) V Amritraj (Romania) I Năstase	7	2	6
(United States) V Gerulaitis (South Africa) J Kriek	5	6	5
7	(United States) G Donnelly (United States) B Walts	7	3	7
4	(Sweden) S Edberg (Sweden) A Järryd	6	3	6
(Sweden) J Nyström (Sweden) M Wilander	3	6	1
(Brazil) A Hocevar (Brazil) M Hocevar	4	4
5	(Switzerland) H Günthardt (Hungary) B Taróczy	6	6

Quarterfinals
(India) V Amritraj (Romania) I Năstase	6	7	7
7	(United States) G Donnelly (United States) B Walts	7	6	5
4	(Sweden) S Edberg (Sweden) A Järryd	7	6	3
5	(Switzerland) H Günthardt (Hungary) B Taróczy	5	7	6

Semifinals
(India) V Amritraj (Romania) I Năstase	7	7
5	(Switzerland) H Günthardt (Hungary) B Taróczy	6	5

=== Bottom half ===
First round
(United States) A Kohlberg (Brazil) J Soares	3	6	6
(Italy) S Colombo (Italy) C Panatta	6	3	4
(United States) M Purcell (United States) T Wilkinson	6	6
(Sweden) H Sundström (Sweden) M Tideman	3	2
(Switzerland) J Hlasek (Netherlands) M Schapers	6	6
(United States) R Meyer (United States) B Nealon	3	4
(United States) T Delatte (United States) C Hooper	2	1
(Brazil) C Motta (Sweden) H Simonsson	6	6

Second round
6	(Poland) W Fibak (United States) S Mayer	6	7	7
(United States) A Kohlberg (Brazil) J Soares	7	6	6
(United States) M Purcell (United States) T Wilkinson	4	5
3	(France) H Leconte (Czechoslovakia) T Šmíd	6	7
8	(Sweden) J Gunnarsson (Denmark) M Mortensen	7	7
(Switzerland) J Hlasek (Netherlands) M Schapers	5	5
(Brazil) C Motta (Sweden) H Simonsson	6	6
2	(United States) S Denton (United States) S Stewart	4	4

Quarterfinals
6	(Poland) W Fibak (United States) S Mayer
3	(France) H Leconte (Czechoslovakia) T Šmíd	w/o
8	(Sweden) J Gunnarsson (Denmark) M Mortensen	7	7
(Brazil) C Motta (Sweden) H Simonsson	5	6

Semifinals
3	(France) H Leconte (Czechoslovakia) T Šmíd	6	6
8	(Sweden) J Gunnarsson (Denmark) M Mortensen	4	3
