= 1982 Pacific Southwest Open =

- Date: April 12–18
- Edition: 56th
- Category: Grand Prix
- Draw: 32S / 16D
- Prize money: $200,000
- Surface: Hard / outdoor
- Location: Los Angeles, California, U.S.
- Venue: Los Angeles Tennis Club

Champions

Singles
- (United States) Jimmy Connors

Doubles
- (United States) Sherwood Stewart / (United States) Ferdi Taygan
- Pacific Southwest Open

The 1982 Pacific Southwest Open, also known by its sponsored name Thrifty Union 76 Pacific Southwest Open, was a men's tennis tournament played on outdoor hard courts at the Los Angeles Tennis Club in Los Angeles, California in the United States. The event was part of the Grand Prix tennis circuit. It was the 56th edition of the Pacific Southwest tournament and was held from April 12 through April 18, 1982. First-seeded Jimmy Connors won the singles title and the corresponding $40,000 first-prize money.

== Finals ==
=== Singles ===
(United States) Jimmy Connors defeated (United States) Mel Purcell 6–2, 6–1

- It was Connors' 2nd singles title of the year and the 91st of his career.

=== Doubles ===
(United States) Sherwood Stewart / (United States) Ferdi Taygan defeated (United States) Bruce Manson / (United States) Brian Teacher 6–1, 6–7, 6–3
