= 1984 Stockholm Open – Singles =

Singles
- 1984 Stockholm Open

Final
- Champion: (United States) John McEnroe
- Runner-up: (Sweden) Mats Wilander
- Score: 6–2, 3–6, 6–2

Details
- Draw: 48
- Seeds: 16

Events
Singles	Doubles
← 1983 ·	Stockholm Open	· 1985 →

Mats Wilander was the defending champion, but lost in the final this year.

John McEnroe won the title, defeating Wilander 6–2, 3–6, 6–2 in the final.

== Seeds ==
1. (United States) John McEnroe (champion)
2. (United States) Jimmy Connors (semifinals)
3. (Sweden) Mats Wilander (final)
4. (Sweden) Anders Järryd (semifinals)
5. (Sweden) Henrik Sundström (second round)
6. (Sweden) Joakim Nyström (quarterfinals)
7. (United States) Jimmy Arias (second round)
8. (South Africa) Johan Kriek (quarterfinals)
9. (Czechoslovakia) Tomáš Šmíd (third round)
10. (United States) Vitas Gerulaitis (second round)
11. (United States) Gene Mayer (second round)
12. (Spain) Juan Aguilera (second round)
13. (Sweden) Stefan Edberg (second round)
14. (Spain) José Higueras (second round)
15. (Italy) Francesco Cancellotti (second round)
16. (Belgium) Libor Pimek (third round)

== Draw ==
=== Key ===
- Q = Qualifier
- WC = Wild card
- LL = Lucky loser
- Alt = Alternate
- SE = Special exempt
- PR = Protected ranking
- ITF = ITF entry
- JE = Junior exempt
- w/o = Walkover
- r = Retired
- d = Defaulted
- SR = Special ranking

=== Finals ===
Semifinals
1	(United States) John McEnroe	1	7	6
4	(Sweden) Anders Järryd	6	6	2
3	(Sweden) Mats Wilander	6	6	6
2	(United States) Jimmy Connors	7	3	3

Final
1	(United States) John McEnroe	6	3	6
3	(Sweden) Mats Wilander	2	6	2

=== Top half ===
==== Section 1 ====
First round
WC	(Romania) I Năstase	1	2
(Switzerland) H Günthardt	6	6
Q	(Netherlands) M Schapers	2	6	6
(United States) P Fleming	6	3	4
(Italy) C Panatta	6	2	3
WC	(United States) S Mayer	3	6	6
(Poland) W Fibak	7	6
Q	(Canada) M Wostenholme	5	3

Second round
1	(United States) J McEnroe	6	6
(Switzerland) H Günthardt	3	3
Q	(Netherlands) M Schapers	6	2	6
15	(Italy) F Cancellotti	1	6	2
13	(Sweden) S Edberg	2	6
WC	(United States) S Mayer	6	7
(Poland) W Fibak	7	6
7	(United States) J Arias	6	2

Third round
1	(United States) J McEnroe	6	6
Q	(Netherlands) M Schapers	1	1
WC	(United States) S Mayer	6	3	r
(Poland) W Fibak	3	6

Quarterfinals
1	(United States) J McEnroe	6	6
(Poland) W Fibak	4	2

==== Section 2 ====
First round
(Hungary) B Taróczy	6	7
(Belgium) B Boileau	2	5
(United States) T Wilkison	6	3	7
(West Germany) R Gehring	4	6	6
(Paraguay) V Pecci	7	7
Q	(United States) T Nelson	6	6
(United States) M Purcell	6	4	6
Q	(Finland) L Palin	4	6	0

Second round
4	(Sweden) A Järryd	6	6
(Hungary) B Taróczy	0	3
(United States) T Wilkison	4	4
9	(Czechoslovakia) T Šmíd	6	6
12	(Spain) J Aguilera	3	3
(Paraguay) V Pecci	6	6
(United States) M Purcell	3	3
6	(Sweden) J Nyström	6	6

Third round
4	(Sweden) A Järryd	6	6
9	(Czechoslovakia) T Šmíd	4	2
(Paraguay) V Pecci	7	1	5
6	(Sweden) J Nyström	5	6	7

Quarterfinals
4	(Sweden) A Järryd	6	3	6
6	(Sweden) J Nyström	3	6	3

=== Bottom half ===
==== Section 3 ====
First round
(United States) S Denton	6	4
(India) V Amritraj	7	6
(France) G Forget	7	6
(Brazil) C Motta	6	4
Q	(Socialist Federal Republic of Yugoslavia) S Živojinović	3	4
(Sweden) J Gunnarsson	6	6
(West Germany) M Westphal	6	6
(Israel) S Perkiss	3	3

Second round
5	(Sweden) H Sundström	1	4
(India) V Amritraj	6	6
(France) G Forget	6	6
14	(Spain) J Higueras	2	3
10	(United States) V Gerulaitis	1	6	0
(Sweden) J Gunnarsson	6	4	6
(West Germany) M Westphal	3	2
3	(Sweden) M Wilander	6	6

Third round
(India) V Amritraj	2	6
(France) G Forget	6	7
(Sweden) J Gunnarsson	2	3
3	(Sweden) M Wilander	6	6

Quarterfinals
(France) G Forget	5	3
3	(Sweden) M Wilander	7	6

==== Section 4 ====
First round
(Sweden) T Högstedt	6	6
WC	(Sweden) T Tideman	3	1
(Republic of Ireland) M Doyle	6	6	6
Q	(Switzerland) J Hlasek	3	7	7
(United States) C Hooper	6	3
WC	(Sweden) H Simonsson	7	6
(Sweden) S Simonsson	2	3
(France) H Leconte	6	6

Second round
8	(South Africa) J Kriek	7	7
(Sweden) T Högstedt	5	6
Q	(Switzerland) J Hlasek	6	6
11	(United States) G Mayer	2	1
16	(Belgium) L Pimek	6	6
WC	(Sweden) H Simonsson	1	2
(France) H Leconte	6	3	2
2	(United States) J Connors	3	6	6

Third round
8	(South Africa) J Kriek	4	6	6
Q	(Switzerland) J Hlasek	6	1	4
16	(Belgium) L Pimek	4	2
2	(United States) J Connors	6	6

Quarterfinals
8	(South Africa) J Kriek	6	3	4
2	(United States) J Connors	4	6	6
