= 1977 Birmingham WCT =

- Date: January 12–16, 1977
- Edition: 5th
- Category: WCT
- Draw: 16S / 8D
- Prize money: $100,000
- Surface: Carpet / indoor
- Location: Birmingham, United States

Champions

Singles
- (United States) Jimmy Connors

Doubles
- (Poland) Wojciech Fibak / (Netherlands) Tom Okker
- ATP Birmingham

The 1977 Birmingham WCT was a men's tennis tournament played on indoor carpet courts. It was the fifth edition of the Grand Prix Birmingham, and part of the 1977 World Championship Tennis circuit. It took place in Birmingham, Alabama, United States from January 12 through January 16, 1977. First-seeded Jimmy Connors won his fourth consecutive singles title at the event.

== Finals ==
=== Singles ===
(United States) Jimmy Connors defeated (United States) Bill Scanlon 6–3, 6–3

- It was Connors' 1st singles title of the year and the 54th of his career.

=== Doubles ===
(Poland) Wojciech Fibak / (Netherlands) Tom Okker defeated (United States) Billy Martin / (United States) Bill Scanlon 6–3, 6–4
