= 1979 U.S. Pro Indoor – Doubles =

Doubles
- 1979 U.S. Pro Indoor

Final
- Champions: (Poland) Wojtek Fibak (Netherlands) Tom Okker
- Runners-up: (United States) Peter Fleming (United States) John McEnroe
- Score: 5–7, 6–1, 6–3

Details
- Draw: 24
- Seeds: 8

Events
Singles	Doubles
- U.S. Pro Indoor

Bob Hewitt and Frew McMillan were the defending champions, but Hewitt did not participate this year. McMillan partnered Bob Carmichael, losing in the semifinals.

Wojtek Fibak and Tom Okker won the title, defeating Peter Fleming and John McEnroe 5–7, 6–1, 6–3 in the final.

== Seeds ==
1. (Poland) Wojtek Fibak / (Netherlands) Tom Okker (champions)
2. (United States) Peter Fleming / (United States) John McEnroe (final)
3. (United States) Fred McNair / (United States) Stan Smith (quarterfinals)
4. (United States) Marty Riessen / (United States) Sherwood Stewart (quarterfinals)
5. (United States) Gene Mayer / (United States) Hank Pfister (first round)
6. (Australia) Bob Carmichael / (South Africa) Frew McMillan (semifinals)
7. (Australia) Ross Case / (Australia) Geoff Masters (quarterfinals)
8. (Romania) Ilie Năstase / (Romania) Ion Țiriac (first round)

== Draw ==
Key

- Q = Qualifier
- WC = Wild card
- LL = Lucky loser
- Alt = Alternate
- ITF = ITF entry
- PR = Protected ranking
- SR = Special ranking
- SE = Special exempt
- JE = Junior exempt
- JR = Junior Accelerator Programme entrant
- CO = College Accelerator Programme entrant
- NG = Next Gen Accelerator Program entrant
- w/o = Walkover
- r = Retired
- d = Defaulted

=== Finals ===
Semifinals
1	(Poland) Wojtek Fibak (Netherlands) Tom Okker	6	6
6	(Australia) Bob Carmichael (South Africa) Frew McMillan	1	4
(United States) Dick Stockton (United States) Erik van Dillen	4	6
2	(United States) Peter Fleming (United States) John McEnroe	6	7

Final
1	(Poland) Wojtek Fibak (Netherlands) Tom Okker	5	6	6
2	(United States) Peter Fleming (United States) John McEnroe	7	1	3

=== Top half ===
First round
1	(Poland) W Fibak (Netherlands) T Okker	6	6	6
(United States) T Leonard (United States) M Machette	7	4	2
(Socialist Federal Republic of Yugoslavia) Ž Franulović (United Kingdom) B Mottram	5	7	5
(United States) B Gottfried (United States) B Teacher	7	5	7
(Australia) C Dibley (Chile) J Fillol	6	6	7
(United States) M Cahill (United States) T Moor	7	3	5
(United States) B Manson (United States) A Pattison	3	4
6	(Australia) B Carmichael (South Africa) F McMillan	6	6

Second round
1	(Poland) W Fibak (Netherlands) T Okker	6	7
(South Africa) D Joubert (South Africa) B Mitton	3	5
(United States) B Gottfried (United States) B Teacher	6	6	5
7	(Australia) R Case (Australia) G Masters	7	2	7
3	(United States) F McNair (United States) S Smith	6	4	6
(Australia) C Dibley (Chile) J Fillol	4	6	4
(Israel) S Krulevitz (United States) F Taygan	4	6	3
6	(Australia) B Carmichael (South Africa) F McMillan	6	4	6

Quarterfinals
1	(Poland) W Fibak (Netherlands) T Okker	6	7
7	(Australia) R Case (Australia) G Masters	2	5
3	(United States) F McNair (United States) S Smith	3	2
6	(Australia) B Carmichael (South Africa) F McMillan	6	6

Semifinals
1	(Poland) W Fibak (Netherlands) T Okker	6	6
6	(Australia) B Carmichael (South Africa) F McMillan	1	4

=== Bottom half ===
First round
8	(Romania) I Năstase (Romania) I Țiriac	6	6
(Australia) J Alexander (Australia) S Ball	7	7
(Italy) C Barazzutti (Italy) A Zugarelli	6	3
4	(United States) M Riessen (United States) S Stewart	7	6
5	(United States) G Mayer (United States) H Pfister	4	4
(Switzerland) H Günthardt (United States) V Winitsky	6	6
(India) V Amritraj (United States) A Ashe	6	3
2	(United States) P Fleming (United States) J McEnroe	7	6

Second round
(Australia) J Alexander (Australia) S Ball	6	4
(United States) D Stockton (United States) E van Dillen	7	6
(United States) Ti Gullikson (United States) To Gullikson	4	4
4	(United States) M Riessen (United States) S Stewart	6	6
(Switzerland) H Günthardt (United States) V Winitsky	6	6
(United States) J Bailey (United States) W Blocher	4	3
(United States) V Amaya (Czechoslovakia) V Zedník	3	2
2	(United States) P Fleming (United States) J McEnroe	6	6

Quarterfinals
(United States) D Stockton (United States) E van Dillen	6	6
4	(United States) M Riessen (United States) S Stewart	3	2
(Switzerland) H Günthardt (United States) V Winitsky	3	5
2	(United States) P Fleming (United States) J McEnroe	6	7

Semifinals
(United States) D Stockton (United States) E van Dillen	4	6
2	(United States) P Fleming (United States) J McEnroe	6	7
