= WCT Challenge Cup =

Defunct tennis tournament
- Tour: World Championship Tennis
- Founded: 1976
- Abolished: 1980
- Editions: 5
- Location: Honolulu, Hawaii (1976); Las Vegas, Nevada (1977); Montego Bay, Jamaica (1978); Montreal, Quebec, Canada (1979–80)
- Surface: Hard / outdoors (1976, 1978); Carpet / indoors (1977, 1979–80)

The WCT Challenge Cup was a men's tennis tournament held from 1976 until 1980 that was part of the World Championship Tennis circuit. It was played on outdoor hard courts in 1976, 1978 and indoor carpet courts in 1977 and 1979–80, The tournament was played in Honolulu, Hawaii in 1976, Las Vegas, Nevada in 1977, Montego Bay, Jamaica in 1978, and Montreal, Quebec, Canada from 1979–1980. The tournament featured a field of four or eight players.

== Finals ==
=== Singles ===
Location	Year	Champions	Runners-up	Score
Honolulu	1976	(Romania) Ilie Năstase	(United States) Arthur Ashe	6–3, 1–6, 6–7, 6–3, 6–1
Las Vegas	1977	(Romania) Ilie Nastase	(United States) Jimmy Connors	3–6, 7–6, 6–4, 7–5
Montego Bay	1978	(Romania) Ilie Năstase	(United States) Peter Fleming	2–6, 5–6, 6–2, 6–4, 6–4
Montreal	1979	(Sweden) Björn Borg	(United States) Jimmy Connors	6–4, 6–2, 2–6, 6–4
Montreal	1980	(United States) John McEnroe	(India) Vijay Amritraj	6–1, 6–2, 6–1
