= 1979 U.S. Pro Indoor – Singles =

Singles
- 1979 U.S. Pro Indoor

Final
- Champion: (United States) Jimmy Connors
- Runner-up: (United States) Arthur Ashe
- Score: 6–3, 6–4, 6–1

Details
- Draw: 48
- Seeds: 16

Events
Singles	Doubles
- U.S. Pro Indoor

Jimmy Connors was the defending champion.

Connors successfully defended his title, defeating Arthur Ashe, 6–3, 6–4, 6–1 in the final.

== Seeds ==
1. (United States) Jimmy Connors (champion)
2. (Argentina) Guillermo Vilas (third round)
3. (United States) John McEnroe (quarterfinals)
4. (United States) Eddie Dibbs (third round)
5. (United States) Vitas Gerulaitis (semifinals)
6. (United States) Brian Gottfried (quarterfinals)
7. (United States) Harold Solomon (quarterfinals)
8. (Italy) Corrado Barazzutti (second round)
9. (United States) Roscoe Tanner (semifinals)
10. (United States) Arthur Ashe (final)
11. (Spain) José Higueras (first round)
12. (Romania) Ilie Năstase (second round)
13. (United States) Tim Gullikson (second round)
14. (United States) Dick Stockton (first round)
15. (Poland) Wojtek Fibak (third round)
16. (Australia) John Alexander (first round)

== Draw ==
Key

- Q = Qualifier
- WC = Wild card
- LL = Lucky loser
- Alt = Alternate
- ITF = ITF entry
- PR = Protected ranking
- SR = Special ranking
- SE = Special exempt
- JE = Junior exempt
- JR = Junior Accelerator Programme entrant
- CO = College Accelerator Programme entrant
- NG = Next Gen Accelerator Program entrant
- w/o = Walkover
- r = Retired
- d = Defaulted

=== Finals ===
Semifinals
1	(United States) Jimmy Connors	6	6	3	6
9	(United States) Roscoe Tanner	3	3	6	1
5	(United States) Vitas Gerulaitis	6	6	6	4	4
10	(United States) Arthur Ashe	1	4	7	6	6

Final
1	(United States) Jimmy Connors	6	6	6
10	(United States) Arthur Ashe	3	4	1

=== Top half ===
==== Section 1 ====
First round
1	(United States) J Connors	6	6
(United States) V Winitsky	4	3
(United States) V Amaya	4	7	7
(United States) B Teacher	6	5	5
12	(Romania) I Năstase	6	6
(South Africa) D Joubert	4	4
(Australia) G Masters	7	3	6
(United States) T Moor	6	6	2

Second round
1	(United States) J Connors	6	6
(United States) E van Dillen	1	1
(United States) V Amaya	2	1
15	(Poland) W Fibak	6	6
12	(Romania) I Năstase	5	6	4
Q	(United States) G Hardie	7	4	6
(Australia) G Masters	5	6	6
8	(Italy) C Barazzutti	7	3	3

Third round
1	(United States) J Connors	6	7
15	(Poland) W Fibak	4	6
Q	(United States) G Hardie	4	4
(Australia) G Masters	6	6

Quarterfinals
1	(United States) J Connors	6	6
(Australia) G Masters	3	3

==== Section 2 ====
First round
(United States) M Cahill	1	1
(United States) S Smith	6	6
(United States) H Pfister	6	6
14	(United States) D Stockton	2	4
9	(United States) R Tanner	7	6
(India) V Amritraj	5	4
(Netherlands) T Okker	4	6
4	(United States) E Dibbs	6	7

Second round
3	(United States) J McEnroe	7	6
(United States) S Smith	5	1
(United States) S Stewart	1	0
(United States) H Pfister	6	6
9	(United States) R Tanner	6	6
(United States) T Leonard	3	2
(South Africa) C Drysdale	4	5
4	(United States) E Dibbs	6	7

Third round
3	(United States) J McEnroe	6	7
(United States) H Pfister	2	6
9	(United States) R Tanner	6	6	6
4	(United States) E Dibbs	7	2	2

Quarterfinals
3	(United States) J McEnroe	6	2
9	(United States) R Tanner	7	6

=== Bottom half ===
==== Section 3 ====
First round
(United States) E Teltscher	6	1	5
(United States) A Pattison	4	6	7
(Spain) Á Giménez	2	4
13	(United States) Ti Gullikson	6	6
16	(Australia) J Alexander	4	4
(South Africa) J Kriek	6	6
(Socialist Federal Republic of Yugoslavia) Ž Franulović	6	7
(Chile) J Fillol	4	6

Second round
7	(United States) H Solomon	6	6
(United States) A Pattison	0	3
(United States) G Mayer	6	6
13	(United States) Ti Gullikson	4	3
(South Africa) J Kriek	6	6
(Czechoslovakia) V Zedník	3	4
(Socialist Federal Republic of Yugoslavia) Ž Franulović	4	1
5	(United States) V Gerulaitis	6	6

Third round
7	(United States) H Solomon	6	2	6
(United States) G Mayer	4	6	1
(South Africa) J Kriek	6	2	5
5	(United States) V Gerulaitis	4	6	7

Quarterfinals
7	(United States) H Solomon	2	3
5	(United States) V Gerulaitis	6	6

==== Section 4 ====
First round
6	(United States) B Gottfried	6	6
(United States) J Sadri	3	1
(United States) P DuPré	6	3	7
11	(Spain) J Higueras	1	6	6
10	(United States) A Ashe	6	7
(South Africa) B Mitton	2	6
(United Kingdom) B Mottram	3	7	6
(Switzerland) H Günthardt	6	6	1

Second round
6	(United States) B Gottfried	6	6
(United States) To Gullikson	4	4
Q	(Australia) C Dibley	6	6	6
(United States) P DuPré	3	7	7
10	(United States) A Ashe	6	4	6
(United States) M Riessen	1	6	4
(United Kingdom) B Mottram	4	3
2	(Argentina) G Vilas	6	6

Third round
6	(United States) B Gottfried	6	6
(United States) P DuPré	2	3
10	(United States) A Ashe	6	7
2	(Argentina) G Vilas	3	5

Quarterfinals
6	(United States) B Gottfried	3	5
10	(United States) A Ashe	6	7
