= 1978 Alan King Tennis Classic =

- Date: April 24–30
- Edition: 7th
- Category: Grand Prix
- Draw: 32S/ 16D
- Prize money: $250,000
- Surface: Hard / outdoor
- Location: Las Vegas, NV, U.S.
- Venue: Caesars Palace

Champions

Singles
- (United States) Harold Solomon

Doubles
- (Chile) Álvaro Fillol / (Chile) Jaime Fillol
- Alan King Tennis Classic

The 1978 Alan King Tennis Classic was a men's tennis tournament played on outdoor hard courts at the Caesars Palace in Las Vegas, Nevada in the United States that was part of the 1978 Colgate-Palmolive Grand Prix. It was the seventh edition of the tournament was held from April 24 through April 30, 1978. Harold Solomon won the singles title after Barazzutti had to forfeit in the second set due to illness induced by food poisoning. Solomon earned $50,000 first-prize money as well as 225 Grand Prix points.

== Finals ==
=== Singles ===
(United States) Harold Solomon defeated (Italy) Corrado Barazzutti 6–1, 3–0 ret.

=== Doubles ===
(Chile) Álvaro Fillol / (Chile) Jaime Fillol defeated (South Africa) Bob Hewitt / (Mexico) Raúl Ramírez 6–3, 7–6
