= Birmingham Open =

Defunct tennis tournament
- Tour: ATP Tour
- Founded: 1991
- Abolished: 1991
- Location: Birmingham, England
- Surface: Carpet / indoor

The Birmingham Open is a defunct tennis tournament that was played on the ATP Tour for one year, in 1991. The event was held in Birmingham, England and was played on indoor carpet courts. The tournament was held in November, unlike the other British events which took place in May, June and July. Michael Chang won the singles title, beating Guillaume Raoux in the final.

== Finals ==
=== Singles ===
| Year | Champions | Runners-up | Score |
|---|---|---|---|
| 1991 | (United States) Michael Chang | (France) Guillaume Raoux | 6–3, 6–2 |

=== Doubles ===
| Year | Champions | Runners-up | Score |
|---|---|---|---|
| 1991 | (Netherlands) Jacco Eltingh (Kenya) Paul Wekesa | (Sweden) Ronnie Båthman (Sweden) Rikard Bergh | 7–5, 7–5 |

== See also ==
- Birmingham Open – ATP Challenger 125 men's and WTA 125 women's event
- ATP Birmingham – defunct American ATP tournament
