= Alan King Tennis Classic =

Defunct tennis tournament
- Tour: WCT Tour (1972); Grand Prix circuit (1978–1985)
- Founded: 1972
- Abolished: 1985
- Editions: 13
- Location: Las Vegas, Nevada, United States
- Venue: Caesars Palace
- Surface: Hard / outdoor

The Alan King Tennis Classic was a men's tennis tournament held in Las Vegas, Nevada from 1972 to 1985. It was an event of the WCT Tour in 1972 before joining the Grand Prix tennis circuit from 1978 until 1985, and was one of the major ranking tournaments of both tours. It was part of the Grand Prix Super Series between 1972 and 1981. The event was hosted by American comedian Alan King and was played on outdoor hard courts of the Caesars Palace hotel.

== Past finals ==
=== Singles ===
Year	Champion	Runner-up	Score
1972	(Australia) John Newcombe	(South Africa) Cliff Drysdale	6–3, 6–4
1973	(United States) Brian Gottfried	(United States) Arthur Ashe	6–1, 6–3
1974	(Australia) Rod Laver	(United States) Marty Riessen	6–2, 6–2
1975	(United States) Roscoe Tanner	(Australia) Ross Case	5–7, 7–5, 7–6
1976	(United States) Jimmy Connors	(Australia) Ken Rosewall	6–1, 6–3
1977	(United States) Jimmy Connors	(Mexico) Raúl Ramírez	6–4, 5–7, 6–2
1978	(United States) Harold Solomon	(Italy) Corrado Barazzutti	6–1, 3–0, RET.
1979	(Sweden) Björn Borg	(United States) Jimmy Connors	6–3, 6–2
1980	(Sweden) Björn Borg	(United States) Harold Solomon	6–3, 6–1
1981	(Czech Republic) Ivan Lendl	(United States) Harold Solomon	6–4, 6–2
1982	(United States) Jimmy Connors	(United States) Gene Mayer	5–2, RET.
1983	(United States) Jimmy Connors	(Australia) Mark Edmondson	7–6, 6–1
1984	Not Held		
1985	(United States) Johan Kriek	(United States) Jimmy Arias	4–6, 6–3, 6–4, 6–2

=== Doubles ===
Year	Champion	Runner-up	Score
1972	(Australia) Roy Emerson (Australia) Rod Laver	(Australia) John Newcombe (Australia) Tony Roche	DEF
1973	(United States) Brian Gottfried (United States) Dick Stockton	(Australia) Ken Rosewall (Australia) Fred Stolle	6–7, 6–4, 6–4
1974	(Australia) Roy Emerson (Australia) Rod Laver	(South Africa) Frew McMillan (Australia) John Newcombe	6–7, 6–4, 6–4
1975	(Australia) John Alexander (Australia) Phil Dent	(Australia) Bob Carmichael (South Africa) Cliff Drysdale	6–1, 6–4
1976	(United States) Arthur Ashe (United States) Charlie Pasarell	(United States) Robert Lutz (United States) Stan Smith	6–4, 6–2
1977	(United States) Robert Lutz (United States) Stan Smith	(South Africa) Bob Hewitt (Mexico) Raúl Ramírez	6–3, 3–6, 6–4
1978	(Chile) Álvaro Fillol (Chile) Jaime Fillol	(South Africa) Bob Hewitt (Mexico) Raúl Ramírez	6–3, 7–6
1979	(United States) Marty Riessen (United States) Sherwood Stewart	(Italy) Adriano Panatta (Mexico) Raúl Ramírez	4–6, 6–4, 7–6
1980	(United States) Robert Lutz (United States) Stan Smith	(Poland) Wojciech Fibak (United States) Gene Mayer	6–2, 7–5
1981	(United States) Peter Fleming (United States) John McEnroe	(United States) Tracy Delatte (United States) Trey Waltke	6–3, 7–6
1982	(United States) Sherwood Stewart (United States) Ferdi Taygan	(Brazil) Carlos Kirmayr (United States) Van Winitsky	7–6, 6–4
1983	(South Africa) Kevin Curren (United States) Steve Denton	(United States) Tracy Delatte (United States) Johan Kriek	6–3, 7–5
1984	Not Held		
1985	(Australia) Pat Cash (Australia) John Fitzgerald	(United States) Paul Annacone (South Africa) Christo van Rensburg	7–6, 6–7, 7–6

== See also ==
- Tennis Channel Open
- Las Vegas Challenger
