= List of tennis tournaments =

List of current and past men's and women's tennis tournaments.

Criteria for inclusion:

- The tournament is notable enough to have its own article on Wikipedia
- Historic tournaments are included if notability can be established by reliable third-party sources (references needed)

== World Tennis ==
=== Grand Slam tournaments ===
| Tournament | Month | City | Country | Continent | Surface | Established |
|---|---|---|---|---|---|---|
| Australian Open | January | Melbourne | Australia | Oceania | Hard (blue) | 1905 |
| French Open | May–June | Paris | France | Europe | Red clay | 1891 |
| Wimbledon | June–July | London | United Kingdom | Europe | Grass (green) | 1877 |
| US Open | August–September | New York City | United States | North America | Hard (blue) | 1881 |

=== Team events ===
- Davis Cup (men)
- Billie Jean King Cup (women)
- Hopman Cup (men/women)
- Laver Cup (men)
- United Cup (men/women)

=== Junior ITF grade A events ===
- Abierto Juvenil Mexicano
- Copa Gerdau (Porto Alegre Junior Championships)
- Trofeo Bonfiglio (International Junior Championships of Italy)
- Osaka Mayor's Cup
- Orange Bowl
- Les Petits As (France)

== ATP Tour ==
List of the Association of Tennis Professionals (ATP) Men's tour events.

| Week | Start date | Type | Tournament | Surface | Town/City | Country | Continent | Prize money |
|---|---|---|---|---|---|---|---|---|
| 46 | November 10 | WTF | ATP Finals | Hard (i) | Turin | Italy | Europe | $5,700,000 |
| 10 | March 5 | 1000 | Indian Wells Masters | Hard | Indian Wells | United States | North America | $4,500,000 |
| 12 | March 19 | 1000 | Miami Open | Hard | Miami Gardens | United States | North America | $3,645,000 |
| 15 | April 6 | 1000 | Monte-Carlo Masters | Clay | Roquebrune-Cap-Martin | France | Europe | $2,451,208 |
| 17 | April 23 | 1000 | Madrid Open | Clay | Madrid | Spain | Europe | $3,119,719 |
| 19 | May 7 | 1000 | Italian Open | Clay | Rome | Italy | Europe | $2,451,208 |
| 31 | July 27 | 1000 | Canadian Open | Hard | Toronto | Canada | North America | $2,430,000 |
| 32 | August 5 | 1000 | Cincinnati Masters | Hard | Mason | United States | North America | $2,430,000 |
| 40 | October 1 | 1000 | Shanghai Masters | Hard | Shanghai | China | Asia | $3,240,000 |
| 44 | October 31 | 1000 | Paris Masters | Hard (i) | Paris | France | Europe | $2,451,208 |
| 6 | February 3 | 500 | Dallas Open | Hard (i) | Dallas | United States | North America | $2,760,000 |
| 6 | February 3 | 500 | Rotterdam Open | Hard (i) | Rotterdam | Netherlands | Europe | $1,265,495 |
| 8 | February 17 | 500 | Rio Open | Clay | Rio de Janeiro | Brazil | South America | $1,309,770 |
| 9 | February 24 | 500 | Mexican Open | Hard | Acapulco | Mexico | North America | $955,000 |
| 9 | February 24 | 500 | Dubai Tennis Championships | Hard | Dubai | UAE | Asia | $1,619,500 |
| 16 | April 14 | 500 | Barcelona Open | Clay | Barcelona | Spain | Europe | $1,705,667 |
| 25 | June 16 | 500 | Halle Open | Grass | Halle | Germany | Europe | €663,750 |
| 25 | June 16 | 500 | Queen's Club Championships | Grass | London | United Kingdom | Europe | £640,000 |
| 21 | May 18 | 500 | German Open | Clay | Hamburg | Germany | Europe | €1,000,000 |
| 31 | August 3 | 500 | Washington Open | Hard | Washington, D.C. | United States | North America | $1,165,500 |
| 39 | September 24 | 500 | Japan Open | Hard | Tokyo | Japan | Asia | $1,100,000 |
| 39 | September 24 | 500 | China Open | Hard | Beijing | China | Asia | $2,100,000 |
| 43 | October 20 | 500 | Vienna Open | Hard (i) | Vienna | Austria | Europe | €575,250 |
| 43 | October 20 | 500 | Swiss Indoors | Hard (i) | Basel | Switzerland | Europe | €1,225,000 |
| 1 | December 30 | 250 | Brisbane International | Hard | Brisbane | Australia | Oceania | $372,500 |
| 1 | December 30 | 250 | Hong Kong Open | Hard | Hong Kong | China | Asia | $398,250 |
| 8 | February 17 | 500 | Qatar Open | Hard | Doha | Qatar | Asia | $1,024,000 |
| 2 | January 6 | 250 | Auckland Open | Hard | Auckland | New Zealand | Oceania | $355,500 |
| 2 | January 6 | 250 | Adelaide International | Hard | Adelaide | Australia | Oceania | $766,290 |
| 5 | January 27 | 250 | Open Sud de France | Hard (i) | Montpellier | France | Europe | €426,605 |
| 7 | February 10 | 250 | Delray Beach Open | Hard | Delray Beach | United States | North America | $442,500 |
| 7 | February 10 | 250 | Open 13 | Hard (i) | Marseille | France | Europe | €512,750 |
| 29 | July 14 | 250 | Los Cabos Open | Hard | Los Cabos | Mexico | North America | $889,890 |
| 7 | February 10 | 250 | Argentina Open | Clay | Buenos Aires | Argentina | South America | $475,300 |
| 9 | February 24 | 250 | Chile Open | Clay | Santiago | Chile | South America | $680,140 |
| 14 | March 31 | 250 | Romanian Open | Clay | Bucharest | Romania | Europe | €596,035 |
| 14 | March 31 | 250 | Grand Prix Hassan II | Clay | Marrakech | Morocco | Africa | €398,250 |
| 14 | March 31 | 250 | US Men's Clay Court Championship | Clay | Houston | United States | North America | $442,500 |
| 16 | April 14 | 500 | Bavaria Open | Clay | Munich | Germany | Europe | €398,250 |
| 21 | May 18 | 250 | Geneva Open | Clay | Geneva | Switzerland | Europe | €501,345 |
| 24 | June 9 | 250 | Rosmalen Open | Grass | 's-Hertogenbosch | Netherlands | Europe | €398,250 |
| 24 | June 9 | 250 | Stuttgart Open | Grass | Stuttgart | Germany | Europe | €398,250 |
| 26 | June 23 | 250 | Eastbourne International | Grass | Eastbourne | United Kingdom | Europe | €547,265 |
| 26 | June 23 | 250 | Mallorca Open | Grass | Santa Ponsa | Spain | Europe | $720,000 |
| 29 | July 14 | 250 | Swedish Open | Clay | Båstad | Sweden | Europe | €398,250 |
| 30 | July 20 | 250 | Croatia Open | Clay | Umag | Croatia | Europe | €398,250 |
| 29 | July 14 | 250 | Swiss Open | Clay | Gstaad | Switzerland | Europe | €398,250 |
| 30 | July 20 | 250 | Austrian Open | Clay | Kitzbühel | Austria | Europe | $586,140 |
| 38 | September 17 | 250 | Chengdu Open | Hard | Chengdu | China | Asia | $1,190,210 |
| 38 | September 17 | 250 | Hangzhou Open | Hard | Hangzhou | China | Asia | $1,019,185 |
| 34 | August 17 | 250 | Winston-Salem Open | Hard | Winston-Salem | United States | North America | $663,750 |
| 45 | November 2 | 250 | Moselle Open | Hard (i) | Metz | France | Europe | €398,250 |
| 45 | November 2 | 250 | Belgrade Open | Hard (i) | Belgrade | Serbia | Europe | $766,715 |
| 42 | October 13 | 250 | Stockholm Open | Hard (i) | Stockholm | Sweden | Europe | €531,000 |
| 42 | October 13 | 250 | European Open | Hard (i) | Antwerp | Belgium | Europe | €725,540 |
| 42 | October 13 | 250 | Almaty Open | Hard (i) | Almaty | Kazakhstan | Asia | $1,055,255 |

== WTA Tour ==
List of the Women's tennis Association (WTA) tour events, initially sorted by type, then by date.

| Week | Start date | Type | Tournament | Surface | Town/City | Country | Continent | Prize money |
|---|---|---|---|---|---|---|---|---|
| 35 | October 24 | Premier WTA Tour; Championships | WTA Finals | Hard | Guadalajara | Mexico | North America | $5,000,000 |
| 10 | March 11 | WTA 1000 | Indian Wells Open | Hard | Indian Wells | United States | North America | $4,500,000 |
| 12 | March 23 | WTA 1000 | Miami Open | Hard | Miami Gardens | United States | North America | $4,500,000 |
| 17 | April 29 | WTA 1000 | Madrid Open | Clay | Madrid | Spain | Europe | $4,500,000 |
| 32 | October 3 | WTA 1000 | China Open | Hard | Beijing | China | Asia | $4,500,000 |
| 10 | March 8 | WTA 1000/500 | Dubai Tennis Championships | Hard | Dubai | UAE | Asia | $2,000,000 |
| 9 | March 1 | WTA 1000/500 | Qatar Open | Hard | Doha | Qatar | Asia | $2,168,400 |
| 19 | May 10 | WTA 1000 | Italian Open | Clay | Rome | Italy | Europe | $2,000,000 |
| 25 | August 9 | WTA 1000 | Canadian Open | Hard | Montreal | Canada | North America | $2,000,000 |
| 26 | August 15 | WTA 1000 | Cincinnati Open | Hard | Mason | United States | North America | $2,000,000 |
| 31 | September 26 | WTA 500 | Pan Pacific Open | Hard | Tokyo | Japan | Asia | $2,000,000 |
| 4 | February 7 | WTA 500 | St. Petersburg Ladies' Trophy | Hard (i) | Saint Petersburg | Russia | Europe | $600,000 |
| 10 | April 4 | WTA 500 | Charleston Open | Clay | Charleston | United States | North America | $600,000 |
| 11 | April 18 | WTA 500 | Stuttgart Open | Clay (i) | Stuttgart | Germany | Europe | $600,000 |
| 23 | July 25 | WTA 500 | Silicon Valley Classic | Hard | San Jose | United States | North America | $600,000 |
| 24 | August 1 | WTA 500 | Southern California Open | Hard | San Diego | United States | North America | $700,000 |
| 2 | January 10 | WTA 500 | Sydney International | Hard | Sydney | Australia | Oceania | $600,000 |
| 15 | May 16 | WTA 500 | Brussels Open | Clay | Brussels | Belgium | Europe | $600,000 |
| 18 | June 13 | WTA 500 | Eastbourne International | Grass | Eastbourne | United Kingdom | Europe | $600,000 |
| 27 | August 22 | WTA 500 | Connecticut Open | Hard | New Haven | United States | North America | $600,000 |
| 36 | October 31 | International WTA; Tour Championships | WTA Elite Trophy | Hard (i) | Zhuhai | China | Asia | $750,000 |
| 1 | January 1 | WTA 250 | Shenzhen Open | Hard | Shenzhen | China | Asia | $500,000 |
| 1 | January 3 | WTA 250 | Brisbane International | Hard | Brisbane | Australia | Oceania | $250,000 |
| 1 | January 3 | WTA 250 | ASB Classic | Hard | Auckland | New Zealand | Oceania | $250,000 |
| 2 | January 10 | WTA 250 | Hobart International | Hard | Hobart | Australia | Oceania | $250,000 |
| 4 | January 31 | WTA 250 | Thailand Open | Hard | Hua Hin | Thailand | Asia | $250,000 |
| 5 | February 14 | WTA 250 | Memphis International | Hard (i) | Memphis | United States | North America | $250,000 |
| 5 | February 14 | WTA 250 | Copa Colsanitas | Clay | Bogotá | Colombia | South America | $250,000 |
| 6 | February 21 | WTA 250 | Abierto Zapopan | Clay | Guadalajara | Mexico | North America | $250,000 |
| 7 | February 28 | WTA 250 | Lyon Open | Hard (i) | Lyon | France | Europe | $250,000 |
| 7 | February 28 | WTA 250 | Monterrey Open | Hard | Monterrey | Mexico | North America | $250,000 |
| 10 | April 4 | WTA 250 | Andalucia Tennis Experience | Clay | Marbella | Spain | Europe | $220,000 |
| 11 | April 18 | WTA 250 | Morocco Open | Clay | Rabat | Morocco | Africa | $250,000 |
| 12 | April 25 | WTA 250 | Barcelona Open | Clay | Barcelona | Spain | Europe | $220,000 |
| 12 | April 25 | WTA 250 | Portugal Open | Clay | Oeiras | Portugal | Europe | $220,000 |
| 15 | May 16 | WTA 250 | Internationaux de Strasbourg | Clay | Strasbourg | France | Europe | $250,000 |
| 17 | June 6 | WTA 250 | Danish Open | Hard | Copenhagen | Denmark | Europe | $220,000 |
| 17 | June 6 | WTA 250 | Birmingham Classic | Grass | Birmingham | United Kingdom | Europe | $250,000 |
| 18 | June 13 | WTA 250 | Rosmalen Opens | Grass | 's-Hertogenbosch | Netherlands | Europe | $250,000 |
| 20 | July 4 | WTA 250 | Ladies Open Lausanne | Clay | Lausanne | Switzerland | Europe | $250,000 |
| 20 | July 7 | WTA 250 | Budapest Grand Prix | Clay | Budapest | Hungary | Europe | $250,000 |
| 21 | July 11 | WTA 250 | Internazionali Femminili di Palermo | Clay | Palermo | Italy | Europe | $250,000 |
| 21 | July 11 | WTA 250 | Hamburg European Open | Clay | Hamburg | Germany | Europe | $250,000 |
| 22 | July 18 | WTA 250 | Poland Open | Clay | Gdynia | Poland | Europe | $250,000 |
| 23 | July 25 | WTA 250 | Winners Open | Clay | Cluj-Napoca | Romania | Europe | $250,000 |
| 29 | September 12 | WTA 250 | Tournoi de Québec | Hard (i) | Quebec City | Canada | North America | $220,000 |
| 29 | September 12 | WTA 250 | Tashkent Open | Hard | Tashkent | Uzbekistan | Asia | $220,000 |
| 30 | September 19 | WTA 250 | Guangzhou International Women's Open | Hard | Guangzhou | China | Asia | $250,000 |
| 30 | September 19 | WTA 250 | Korea Open | Hard | Seoul | Korea | Asia | $250,000 |
| 33 | October 10 | WTA 250 | Linz Open | Hard (i) | Linz | Austria | Europe | $250,000 |
| 33 | October 10 | WTA 250 | Japan Women's Open | Hard | Hiroshima | Japan | Asia | $250,000 |
| 34 | October 17 | WTA 250 | Luxembourg Open | Hard (i) | Kockelscheuer | Luxembourg | Europe | $250,000 |
| 36 | November 2 | WTA 250 | Chennai Open | Hard | Chennai | India | Asia | $250,000 |

== ATP Challenger Tour tournaments ==
List of ATP Challenger Tour events.

Bold events are still active events. This list features the most recent winners of each tournament, as of 2021 season (included).

| Competition | Year debut | Last year | Host | Surface | Singles winners | Doubles winners | Prize money |
|---|---|---|---|---|---|---|---|
| Aberto de São Paulo | 2001 | 2014 | (Brazil) São Paulo | Hard (indoors) | (Brazil) João Souza | (Germany) Gero Kretschmer (Germany) Alexander Satschko | $125,000 |
| Alexander Kolyaskin Memorial | 2002 | 2008 | (Ukraine) Donetsk | Hard (outdoors) | (Russia) Igor Kunitsyn | (Belgium) Xavier Malisse (Belgium) Dick Norman | $50,000 |
| AON Open Challenger | 2003 | – | (Italy) Genoa | Clay (outdoors) | (Italy) Lorenzo Sonego | (Uruguay) Ariel Behar (Ecuador) Gonzalo Escobar | €127,000 |
| Aspria Tennis Cup | 2006 | – | (Italy) Milan | Clay (outdoor) | (Italy) Gian Marco Moroni | (Czech Republic) Vít Kopřiva (Czech Republic) Jiří Lehečka | €42,500 |
| AT&T Challenger of Dallas | 1998 | – | (United States) Dallas | Hard (indoor) | (Austria) Jurij Rodionov | (United States) Dennis Novikov (Portugal) Gonçalo Oliveira | $135,400 |
| Bancolombia Open | 1994 | 2010 | (Colombia) Bogotá | Clay | (Brazil) João Souza | (Brazil) Franco Ferreiro (Mexico) Santiago González | $125,000 |
| Banja Luka Challenger | 2002 | – | (Bosnia and Herzegovina) Banja Luka | Clay | (Argentina) Juan Manuel Cerúndolo | (Croatia) Antonio Šančić (Croatia) Nino Serdarušić | €85,000 |
| Baton Rouge Pro Tennis Classic | 2006 | 2010 | (United States) Baton Rouge | Hard | (South Africa) Kevin Anderson | (Australia) Stephen Huss (Australia) Joseph Sirianni | $50,000 |
| BH Telecom Indoors | 2003 | 2013 | (Bosnia and Herzegovina) Sarajevo | Hard | (France) Adrian Mannarino | (Bosnia and Herzegovina) Mirza Bašić (Bosnia and Herzegovina) Tomislav Brkić | €30,000 |
| BH Tennis Open International Cup | 1992 | 2011 | (Brazil) Belo Horizonte | Hard | (Brazil) Júlio Silva | (Argentina) Guido Andreozzi (Argentina) Eduardo Schwank | $35,000 |
| Black Forest Open | 1996 | 2009 | (Germany) Freudenstadt | Clay (outdoors) | (Czech Republic) Jan Hájek | (Czech Republic) Jan Hájek (Czech Republic) Dušan Karol | €30,000 |
| BMW Tennis Championship | 2004 | 2010 | (United States) Sunrise | Hard | (Germany) Florian Mayer | (Czech Republic) Martin Damm (Slovakia) Filip Polášek | $125,000 |
| BNP Paribas de Nouvelle-Calédonie | 2004 | – | (New Caledonia) Nouméa | Hard | (United States) J. J. Wolf | (Italy) Andrea Pellegrino (Spain) Mario Vilella Martínez | $75,000 |
| Brașov Challenger | 1996 | 2014 | (Romania) Brașov | Clay (outdoors) | (Austria) Andreas Haider-Maurer | (Italy) Daniele Giorgini (Romania) Adrian Ungur | €35,000 |
| Bukhara Challenger | 2000 | 2008 | (Uzbekistan) Bukhara | Hard (outdoors) | (Uzbekistan) Denis Istomin | (Russia) Pavel Chekhov (Russia) Mikhail Elgin | $35,000 |
| Calabasas Pro Tennis Championships | 2001 | 2012 | (United States) Calabasas | Hard (outdoors) | (Australia) Marinko Matosevic | (United States) Ryan Harrison (United States) Travis Rettenmaier | $50,000 |
| Camparini Gioielli Cup | 2003 | 2010 | (Italy) Reggio Emilia | Clay | (Argentina) Carlos Berlocq | (Austria) Philipp Oswald (Austria) Martin Slanar | €42,500 |
| Capri Watch Cup | 1905 | 2016 | (Italy) Naples | Clay | (Slovakia) Jozef Kovalík | (Germany) Gero Kretschmer (Germany) Alexander Satschko | €42,500 |
| San Benedetto Tennis Cup | 2001 | – | (Italy) San Benedetto | Clay | (Argentina) Renzo Olivo | (Croatia) Ivan Sabanov (Croatia) Matej Sabanov | €42,500 |
| Carson Challenger | 2005 | 2010 | (United States) Carson | Hard | (United States) Donald Young | (United States) Brian Battistone (United States) Nicholas Monroe | $50,000 |
| Challenger Ciudad de Guayaquil | 2005 | – | (Ecuador) Guayaquil | Clay (outdoors) | (Chile) Alejandro Tabilo | (Netherlands) Jesper de Jong (Netherlands) Bart Stevens | $50,000 |
| Challenger de Drummondville | 2006 | – | (Canada) Drummondville (2015 -) (Canada) Rimouski (2006–2014) | Hard (indoors) | (United States) Maxime Cressy | (France) Manuel Guinard (France) Arthur Rinderknech | $75,000 |
| Challenger de Granby | 1993 | – | (Canada) Granby (1995 -) (Canada) Montebello (1993, 1994) | Hard (outdoors) | (United States) Ernesto Escobedo | (Sweden) André Göransson (Netherlands) Sem Verbeek | $100,000 |
| Challenger de Salinas | 1996 | | (Ecuador) Salinas | Hard (1996–2011); Clay (2012–2014) | (Ecuador) Emilio Gómez | (Colombia) Nicolás Barrientos (Peru) Sergio Galdós | $35,000 |
| Challenger Eckental | 1997 | – | (Germany) Eckental | Carpet | (Germany) Daniel Masur | (Czech Republic) Roman Jebavý (United Kingdom) Jonny O'Mara | €43,000 |
| Challenger Internazionale Dell'Insubria | 2006 | 2008 | (Switzerland) Chiasso | Clay (outdoors) | (Morocco) Younes El Aynaoui | (Argentina) Mariano Hood (Spain) Alberto Martín | €30,000 |
| Challenger La Manche | 1994 | – | (France) Cherbourg | Hard (indoors) | (Belgium) Ruben Bemelmans | (Slovakia) Lukáš Klein (Slovakia) Alex Molčan | €42,500 |
| Challenger Lugano | 1999 | 2010 | (Switzerland) Lugano | Clay | (Switzerland) Stanislas Wawrinka | (Portugal) Frederico Gil (Belgium) Christophe Rochus | €85,000 |
| Citta di Como Challenger | 2006 | – | (Italy) Como | Clay (outdoors) | (Argentina) Juan Manuel Cerúndolo | (Brazil) Rafael Matos (Brazil) Felipe Meligeni Alves | €64,000 |
| Ciutat de Barcelona Tennis Tournament | 1993 | 2006 | (Spain) Barcelona | Clay | (Spain) Marcel Granollers | (Germany) Tomas Behrend (Italy) Flavio Cipolla | |
| Open Medellín | 2004 | | (Colombia) Medellín | Clay | (Brazil) Gilbert Klier Júnior | (Brazil) Pedro Boscardin Dias (Brazil) Gustavo Heide | $35,000 |
| Copa Petrobras Asunción | 2006 | 2010 | (Paraguay) Asunción | Clay (outdoors) | (Portugal) Rui Machado | (Italy) Fabio Fognini (Italy) Paolo Lorenzi | $75,000 |
| Copa Petrobras Bogotá | 2004 | 2010 | (Colombia) Bogotá | Clay (outdoors) | (Brazil) João Souza | (Brazil) Franco Ferreiro (Brazil) André Sá | $75,000 |
| Copa Petrobras Buenos Aires | 2004 | 2010 | (Argentina) Buenos Aires | Clay (outdoors) | (Argentina) Máximo González | (Argentina) Carlos Berlocq (Argentina) Brian Dabul | $75,000 |
| Copa Petrobras São Paulo | 2004 | 2010 | (Brazil) São Paulo | Clay (outdoors) | (Brazil) Marcos Daniel | (Brazil) Franco Ferreiro (Brazil) André Sá | $75,000 |
| Czech Open | 1994 | – | (Czech Republic) Prostějov | Clay (outdoors) | (Argentina) Federico Coria | (Kazakhstan) Aleksandr Nedovyesov (Portugal) Gonçalo Oliveira | €106,500 |
| East London Challenger | 2008 | 2008 | (South Africa) East London | Hard (outdoors) | (Croatia) Ivan Ljubičić | (Sweden) Jonas Björkman (Zimbabwe) Kevin Ullyett | |
| Ethias Trophy | 2005 | 2016 | (Belgium) Mons | Hard | (Germany) Jan-Lennard Struff | (Austria) Julian Knowle (Austria) Jürgen Melzer | $125,000 |
| Fergana Challenger | 2000 | – | (Uzbekistan) Fergana | Hard | (Finland) Emil Ruusuvuori | (United States) Evan King (United States) Hunter Reese | $50,000 |
| Ford Tennis Championships | 2006 | 2008 | (United States) Louisville | Hard (indoors) | (United States) Amer Delić | (Netherlands) Robin Haase (Netherlands) Igor Sijsling | $50,000 |
| Franken Challenge | 1987 | 2016 | (Germany) Fürth | Clay | (Moldova) Radu Albot | (Argentina) Facundo Argüello (Venezuela) Roberto Maytín | €42,500 |
| Garden Open | 2002 | – | (Italy) Rome | Clay | (Argentina) Juan Manuel Cerúndolo | (France) Sadio Doumbia (France) Fabien Reboul | €42,500 |
| Geneva Open Challenger | 1988 | 2014 | (Switzerland) Geneva | Hard (indoors) | (Cyprus) Marcos Baghdatis | (Sweden) Johan Brunström (United States) Nicholas Monroe | €100,000 |
| GHI Bronx Tennis Classic | 1993 | 2008 | (United States) Bronx | Hard | (Czech Republic) Lukáš Dlouhý | (Czech Republic) Lukáš Dlouhý (Czech Republic) Tomáš Zíb | $50,000 |
| Grenoble Challenger | 1999 | 2008 | (France) Grenoble | Hard (indoors) | (Belgium) Kristof Vliegen | (Austria) Martin Fischer (Austria) Philipp Oswald | $50,000 |
| Guzzini Challenger | 2003 | – | (Italy) Recanati | Hard | (Belarus) Egor Gerasimov | (Portugal) Gonçalo Oliveira (India) Ramkumar Ramanathan | €42,000 |
| International Tournament of Messina | 1980 | 1991 | (Italy) Messina | Clay (outdoors) | (Italy) Massimo Valeri | No doubles events were held | $100,000 |
| Internationaux du Doubs – Open de Franche-Comté | 1996 | 2009 | (France) Thise | Hard | (Belgium) Kristof Vliegen | (Slovakia) Karol Beck (Czech Republic) Jaroslav Levinský | €106,500 |
| Internazionali di Monza e Brianza | 2005 | 2012 | (Italy) Monza | Clay | (Spain) Daniel Gimeno Traver | (Kazakhstan) Andrey Golubev (Kazakhstan) Yuri Schukin | €64,000 |
| Internazionali di Tennis di Manerbio – Trofeo Dimmidisì | 1999 | | (Italy) Manerbio | Clay (outdoors) | (Italy) Federico Gaio | (Brazil) Fabrício Neis (Brazil) Fernando Romboli | €64,000 |
| Intersport Heilbronn Open | 1984 | 2014 | (Germany) Talheim | Hard (indoors) | (Germany) Peter Gojowczyk | (Poland) Tomasz Bednarek (Finland) Henri Kontinen | €85,000 |
| IPP Open | 2001 | 2014 | (Finland) Helsinki | Hard (indoors) | (Estonia) Jürgen Zopp | (Finland) Henri Kontinen (Finland) Jarkko Nieminen | €42,500 |
| Ipsos Bucharest Challenger | 2007 | 2008 | (Romania) Bucharest | Clay (outdoors) | (Spain) Santiago Ventura Bertomeu | (Spain) Rubén Ramírez Hidalgo (Spain) Santiago Ventura | €30,000 |
| Israel Open | 2008 | 2016 | (Israel) Ra'anana | Hard | (Russia) Evgeny Donskoy | (Russia) Konstantin Kravchuk (Ukraine) Denys Molchanov | $125,000 |
| JSM Challenger of Champaign–Urbana | 1996 | – | (United States) Champaign | Hard | (United States) Stefan Kozlov | (United States) Nathaniel Lammons (United States) Jackson Withrow | $50,000 |
| Købstædernes ATP Challenger | 2005 | 2009 | (Denmark) Kolding | Hard (indoors) | (United Kingdom) Alex Bogdanovic | (Austria) Martin Fischer (Austria) Philipp Oswald | €42,500 |
| Lambertz Open by STAWAG | 1991 | 2010 | (Germany) Aachen | Carpet | (Germany) Dustin Brown | (Belgium) Ruben Bemelmans (Netherlands) Igor Sijsling | €42,500 |
| Levene Gouldin & Thompson Tennis Challenger | 1994 | – | (United States) Binghamton | Hard (outdoors) | (Japan) Yūichi Sugita | (Australia) Max Purcell (Australia) Luke Saville | $50,000 |
| Lexington Challenger | 1995 | – | (United States) Lexington | Hard (outdoors) | (Australia) Jason Kubler | (Canada) Liam Draxl (United States) Stefan Kozlov | $50,000 |
| Lubbock Challenger | 2005 | 2008 | (United States) Lubbock | Hard (outdoors) | (United States) John Isner | (Moldova) Roman Borvanov (Russia) Artem Sitak | $50,000 |
| Mamaia Challenger | 2006 | 2009 | (Romania) Constanța | Clay | (Slovenia) Blaž Kavčič | (Chile) Adrián García (Spain) David Marrero | €30,000 |
| Manchester Open | 1880 | 2009 | (United Kingdom) Manchester | Grass | (Belgium) Olivier Rochus | (United Kingdom) Joshua Goodall (United Kingdom) Jonathan Murray | |
| Manta Open | 2004 | 2014 | (Ecuador) Manta | Hard | 2014 winner (France) Adrian Mannarino | 2014 winner (United States) Chase Buchanan (Canada) Peter Polansky | |
| Memorial Argo Manfredini | 2000 | 2008 | (Italy) Sassuolo | Clay (outdoors) | (Portugal) Frederico Gil | (Argentina) Juan-Martín Aranguren (Italy) Stefano Galvani | €30,000 |
| Men's Pro Challenger at Tunica National | 2005 | 2008 | (United States) Tunica Resorts | Clay (outdoors) | (Peru) Iván Miranda | (Serbia) Vladimir Obradović (South Africa) Izak van der Merwe | $50,000 |
| Milo Open Cali | 2008 | 2017 | (Colombia) Cali | Clay (outdoors) | (Argentina) Federico Delbonis | (El Salvador) Marcelo Arévalo (Mexico) Miguel Ángel Reyes-Varela | $50,000 |
| Music City Challenger | 2004 | 2008 | (United States) Nashville | Hard (indoors) | (United States) Robert Kendrick | (United States) Jason Marshall (United States) Travis Parrott | $75,000 |
| Nielsen Pro Tennis Championship | 1984 | – | (United States) Winnetka | Hard (outdoors) | (United States) Bradley Klahn | (United States) JC Aragone (United States) Bradley Klahn | $75,000 |
| Nordic Naturals Challenger | 1988 | – | (United States) Aptos | Hard | (United States) Steve Johnson | (El Salvador) Marcelo Arévalo (Mexico) Miguel Ángel Reyes-Varela | $100,000 |
| Nottingham Open | 1970 | – | (United Kingdom) Nottingham | Grass | (United States) Frances Tiafoe | (Australia) Matt Reid (United Kingdom) Ken Skupski | €132,280 |
| Oberstaufen Cup | 1992 | 2014 | (Germany) Oberstaufen | Clay (outdoors) | (Italy) Simone Bolelli | (Netherlands) Wesley Koolhof (Italy) Alessandro Motti | €30,000 |
| Open Bogotá | 2005 | 2017 | (Colombia) Bogotá | Clay | (El Salvador) Marcelo Arévalo | (El Salvador) Marcelo Arévalo (Mexico) Miguel Ángel Reyes-Varela | $125,000 |
| Open Castilla y León | 1986 | – | (Spain) El Espinar | Hard | (France) Benjamin Bonzi | (United States) Robert Galloway (United States) Alex Lawson | €64,000 |
| Open Città della Disfida | 1997 | – | (Italy) Barletta | Clay (outdoors) | (Portugal) Nuno Borges | (Russia) Evgeny Karlovskiy (Russia) Evgenii Tiurnev | €42,500 |
| Open de Rennes | 2006 | – | (France) Rennes | Hard (indoors) | (France) Benjamin Bonzi | (Netherlands) Bart Stevens (Netherlands) Tim van Rijthoven | €42,500 |
| Open Diputación | 1999 | | (Spain) Pozoblanco | Hard | (Turkey) Altuğ Çelikbilek | (Netherlands) Igor Sijsling (Netherlands) Tim van Rijthoven | €100,000 |
| Open d'Orléans | 2005 | – | (France) Orléans | Hard (indoors) | (Switzerland) Henri Laaksonen | (France) Pierre-Hugues Herbert (France) Albano Olivetti | €106,500 |
| Open Isla de Lanzarote | 2006 | 2008 | (Spain) Puerto del Carmen | Hard (outdoors) | (Switzerland) Stéphane Bohli | (South Africa) Rik de Voest (Poland) Łukasz Kubot | €42,500 |
| Open Tarragona Costa Daurada | 2006 | 2010 | (Spain) Tarragona | Clay (outdoors) | (Spain) Marcel Granollers | (Spain) Guillermo Olaso (Spain) Pere Riba | €42,500 |
| Ostdeutscher Sparkassen Cup | 2005 | 2008 | (Germany) Dresden | Clay (outdoors) | (Germany) Andreas Beck | (Germany) Daniel Brands (South Korea) Woong-Sun Jun | €42,000 |
| Pekao Szczecin Open | 1993 | – | (Poland) Szczecin | Clay | (Czech Republic) Zdeněk Kolář | (Mexico) Santiago González (Argentina) Andrés Molteni | €106,500 |
| PEOPLEnet Cup | 2003 | 2008 | (Ukraine) Dnipropetrovsk | Hard (indoors) | (France) Fabrice Santoro | (Argentina) Guillermo Cañas (Russia) Dmitry Tursunov | €125,000 |
| Prague Open | 2000 | | (Czech Republic) Prague | Clay (outdoors) | (Austria) Sebastian Ofner | (Portugal) Francisco Cabral (Poland) Szymon Walków | €42,000 |
| Prosperita Open | 2004 | – | (Czech Republic) Ostrava | Clay (outdoors) | (Austria) Alexander Erler | (Austria) Alexander Erler (Austria) Lucas Miedler | €42,500 |
| Quito Challenger | 1995 | | (Ecuador) Quito | Clay (outdoors) | (Argentina) Facundo Mena | (Colombia) Alejandro Gómez (Argentina) Thiago Agustín Tirante | $40,000 |
| Rijeka Open | 2007 | 2011 | (Croatia) Rijeka | Clay (outdoors) | (Portugal) Rui Machado | (Italy) Paolo Lorenzi (Brazil) Júlio Silva | €30,000 |
| Rimini Challenger | 2004 | 2010 | (Italy) Rimini | Clay (outdoors) | (Italy) Paolo Lorenzi | (Italy) Giulio Di Meo (Romania) Adrian Ungur | €42,500 |
| Samarkand Challenger | 1996 | – | (Uzbekistan) Samarkand | Clay | (Brazil) João Menezes | (Portugal) Gonçalo Oliveira (Belarus) Andrei Vasilevski | $50,000 |
| Samsung Securities Cup | 2000 | 2013 | (South Korea) Seoul | Hard | (Serbia) Dušan Lajović | (Croatia) Marin Draganja (Croatia) Mate Pavić | $50,000 |
| San Luis Open Challenger Tour | 1988 | – | (Mexico) San Luis Potosí City | Clay (outdoors) | (Switzerland) Marc-Andrea Hüsler | (El Salvador) Marcelo Arévalo (Mexico) Miguel Ángel Reyes-Varela | $35,000 |
| Sanremo Tennis Cup | 2002 | 2010 | (Italy) Sanremo | Clay | (Argentina) Gastón Gaudio | (Argentina) Diego Junqueira (Argentina) Martín Vassallo Argüello | €30,000 |
| Serbia Challenger Open | 2002 | | (Serbia) Belgrade | Hard (indoors) | (Spain) Roberto Carballés Baena | (Argentina) Guillermo Durán (Argentina) Andrés Molteni | €106,500 |
| Shelbourne Irish Open | 2006 | 2008 | (Republic of Ireland) Dublin | Carpet | (Australia) Robert Smeets | (India) Prakash Amritraj (Pakistan) Aisam-ul-Haq Qureshi | €64,000 |
| Shimadzu All Japan Indoor Tennis Championships | 1997 | 2018 | (Japan) Kyoto | Hard | (Australia) John Millman | (Australia) Luke Saville (Australia) Jordan Thompson | $35,000 |
| Sparkassen Open | 1994 | – | (Germany) Braunschweig | Clay | (Germany) Daniel Altmaier | (Poland) Szymon Walków (Poland) Jan Zieliński | €106,500 |
| Sporting Challenger | 2002 | 2011 | (Italy) Turin | Clay | (Argentina) Carlos Berlocq | (Austria) Martin Fischer (Austria) Philipp Oswald | €85,000 |
| s Tennis Masters Challenger | 1991 | 2008 | (Austria) Graz | Clay (outdoors) | (France) Jérémy Chardy | (Austria) Gerald Melzer (Austria) Jürgen Melzer | €30,000 |
| Sunset Moulding YCRC Challenger | 2005 | 2009 | (United States) Yuba City | Hard | (United States) Ryler DeHeart | (Australia) Carsten Ball (United States) Travis Rettenmaier | $50,000 |
| Surbiton Trophy | 1998 | – | (United Kingdom) Surbiton | Grass | (United Kingdom) Dan Evans | (Spain) Marcel Granollers (Japan) Ben McLachlan | €42,500 |
| Swanston Challenger | 2005 | 2015 | (United States) Sacramento | Hard (outdoors) | (United States) Taylor Harry Fritz | (Slovenia) Blaž Kavčič (Slovenia) Grega Žemlja | $50,000 |
| Tallahassee Tennis Challenger | 2000 | – | (United States) Tallahassee | Clay | (United States) Jenson Brooksby | (Brazil) Orlando Luz (Brazil) Rafael Matos | $75,000 |
| Tampere Open | 1982 | – | (Finland) Tampere | Clay | (Czech Republic) Jiří Lehečka | (Argentina) Pedro Cachin (Argentina) Facundo Mena | €42,500 |
| The Hague Open | 1993 | 2018 | (Netherlands) Scheveningen | Clay | (Netherlands) Thiemo de Bakker | (Philippines) Ruben Gonzales (United States) Nathaniel Lammons | €64,000 |
| Tennislife Cup | 2007 | 2011 | (Italy) Naples | Clay (outdoors) | (Argentina) Leonardo Mayer | (Kazakhstan) Yuri Schukin (Croatia) Antonio Veić | €42,500 |
| Timișoara Challenger | 2004 | 2013 | (Romania) Timișoara | Clay (outdoors) | (Austria) Andreas Haider-Maurer | (Montenegro) Goran Tošić (United States) Denis Zivkovic | €30,000 |
| Torneio Internacional de Tênis Campos do Jordão | 2001 | 2011 | (Brazil) Campos do Jordão | Hard | (Brazil) Rogério Dutra da Silva | (Colombia) Juan Sebastián Cabal (Colombia) Robert Farah Maksoud | $50,000 |
| Trofeo Faip-Perrel | 2006 | – | (Italy) Bergamo | Hard (indoors) | (Denmark) Holger Rune | (Czech Republic) Zdeněk Kolář (Czech Republic) Jiří Lehečka | €64,000 |
| Tunis Open | 2005 | – | (Tunisia) Tunis | Clay | (Uruguay) Pablo Cuevas | (Belgium) Ruben Bemelmans (Germany) Tim Pütz | €125,000 |
| Uruguay Open | 2005 | – | (Uruguay) Montevideo | Clay (outdoors) | (Bolivia) Hugo Dellien | (Brazil) Rafael Matos (Brazil) Felipe Meligeni Alves | $50,000 |
| USTA Waikoloa Challenger | 2000 | 2008 | (United States) Waikoloa Village | | (Taiwan) Yen-Hsun Lu | (United States) Scott Lipsky (United States) David Martin | |
| Vancouver Open | 2002 | – | (Canada) West Vancouver | Hard (outdoors) | (Lithuania) Ričardas Berankis | (Sweden) Robert Lindstedt (United Kingdom) Jonny O'Mara | $100,000 |
| Volkswagen Challenger | 1993 | 2012 | (Germany) Wolfsburg | Synthetic | (Netherlands) Igor Sijsling | (Lithuania) Laurynas Grigelis (Belarus) Uladzimir Ignatik | €30,000 |
| Wrocław Open | 2000 | 2017 | (Poland) Wrocław | Hard (indoor) | (Austria) Jürgen Melzer | (Canada) Adil Shamasdin (Belarus) Andrei Vasilevski | €106,500 |
| XL Bermuda Open | 1995 | 2008 | (Bermuda) Paget | Clay | (Japan) Kei Nishikori | (Israel) Harel Levy (United States) Jim Thomas | $100,000 |
| Zagreb Open | 1996 | | (Croatia) Zagreb | Clay (outdoors) | (Argentina) Sebastián Báez | (United States) Evan King (United States) Hunter Reese | €50,000 |
| Internazionali di Tennis del Friuli Venezia Giulia | 2004 | – | (Italy) Cordenons | Clay | (Argentina) Francisco Cerúndolo | (Brazil) Orlando Luz (Brazil) Rafael Matos | €42,000 |

== Exhibition tournaments ==
| Competition | Year debut | Last year | Host | Surface | Men's singles winners | Women's singles winners | Prize money |
|---|---|---|---|---|---|---|---|
| BNP Paribas Showdown | 2008 | 2017 | (United States) New York City (2008–2017); Hong Kong (2013–2014) (United Kingdom) London (2014) | Hard | (France) Gaël Monfils | (United States) Serena Williams | |
| Boodles Challenge | 2002 | 2014 | (United Kingdom) Stoke Poges | Grass | (Netherlands) Robin Haase | Only men's singles | |
| Challenge of Champions | 1981 | 1989 | (United States) Las Vegas (1984); Atlanta (1985–1989) | Clay | (United States) Andre Agassi | Only men's singles | $1,200,000 |
| Diamond Games | 2002 | 2015 | (Belgium) Antwerp | Hard | Only women's singles | (Germany) Andrea Petkovic | $731,000 |
| ECC Antwerp | 1982 | 1998 | (Belgium) Antwerp | Carpet (1982–1996); Hard (1997–1998) | (United Kingdom) Greg Rusedski | Only men's singles | $1,000,000 |
| Hong Kong Tennis Classic | 1999 | 2011 | Hong Kong | Hard | Only women's singles | "Team Russia"; Yevgeny Kafelnikov; Maria Kirilenko; Vera Zvonareva | |
| Kooyong Classic | 1988 | – | (Australia) Melbourne | Hard | (Australia) Bernard Tomic | (Switzerland) Belinda Bencic | |
| La Grande Sfida | 2011 | 2016 | (Italy) Various locations | Hard | (Sweden) Thomas Enqvist | (Serbia) Ana Ivanovic (Russia) Maria Sharapova | |
| Liverpool International Tennis Tournament | 2002 | – | (United Kingdom) Liverpool | Grass | (Italy) Paolo Lorenzi | (Estonia) Kaia Kanepi | |
| World Tennis Championship | 2009 | – | (United Arab Emirates) Abu Dhabi | Hard | (Serbia) Novak Djokovic | (United States) Venus Williams | $25,000 |
| River Oaks International Tennis Tournament | 1931 | 2007 | (United States) Houston | Clay | (Russia) Dmitri Tursunov | Only men's singles | |
| Singapore Women's Tennis Exhibition | 2011 | | Singapore | Hard | Only women's singles | (Italy) Flavia Pennetta | |
| Turbo Tennis | 2007 | | (United Kingdom) London | Hard | (Spain) David Ferrer | Only men's singles | £50,000 |
| 6 Kings Slam | 2024 | | (Saudi Arabia) Riyadh | Hard | (Italy) Jannik Sinner | Only men's singles | $6,000,000 USD |

== Past events ==
=== Men ===
| Competition | Year debut | Last year | Host | Surface | Tour |
|---|---|---|---|---|---|
| Adidas Open de Toulouse Midi-Pyrénées | 1982 | 2000 | Toulouse | Carpet (1982–1993); Hard (1994–2000) | Grand Prix (1982–1989); ATP Tour (1990–2000) |
| Aix-en-Provence Open | 1977 | 1984 | Aix-en-Provence | Clay | Grand Prix |
| Alan King Tennis Classic | 1972 | 1985 | Las Vegas | Hard | WCT Tour (1972); Grand Prix (1978–1985) |
| Ancona Open | 1982 | | Ancona | Carpet | Grand Prix |
| Aptos Open | 1973 | | Aptos | Hard | Grand Prix |
| Arkansas International Tennis Tournament | 1974 | 1979 | North Little Rock | Carpet | Grand Prix |
| Aryamehr Cup | 1971 | 1977 | Tehran | Clay | WCT Tour (1971); Grand Prix (1973–1977) |
| Atlanta WCT | 1970 | 1976 | Atlanta | Hard (1970); Clay (1973–1974); Carpet (1975–1976) | World Championship Tennis |
| ATP Athens Open | 1981 | 1994 | Athens | Clay | Grand Prix circuit (1986–1989); ATP Tour (1990–1994) |
| ATP Birmingham | 1973 | 1980 | Birmingham | Carpet | World Championship Tennis |
| ATP Bolzano | 1992 | 1993 | Bolzano | Carpet | ATP Tour |
| ATP Bordeaux | 1979 | 1995 | Bordeaux | Clay | Grand Prix circuit (1979–1989); ATP Tour (1990–1995) |
| ATP Búzios | 1991 | 1992 | Búzios | Clay | ATP Tour |
| ATP Florence | 1980 | 1994 | Florence | Clay | Grand Prix (1973–1989); ATP Tour (1990–1994) |
| ATP Itaparica | 1986 | 1990 | Itaparica | Hard | Grand Prix |
| ATP Linz | 1979 | 1982 | Linz | Various surfaces | Grand Prix |
| ATP Luxembourg | 1984 | | Kockelscheuer | Carpet | Grand Prix |
| ATP Montevideo | 1994 | 1995 | Montevideo | Clay | ATP Challenger Tour |
| ATP Osaka | 1993 | 1994 | Osaka | Hard | ATP Tour |
| ATP Saint-Vincent | 1986 | 1989 | Saint-Vincent | Clay | Grand Prix |
| ATP Venice | 1981 | 1983 | Venice | Clay | Grand Prix |
| ATP Zaragoza | 1993 | 1994 | Zaragoza | Carpet | ATP Tour |
| Australian Hard Court Tennis Championships | 1938 | 2008 | Various locations | Hard | Grand Prix |
| Australian Indoor Tennis Championships | 1973 | 1994 | Sydney | Hard | Grand Prix (1973–1989); ATP Tour (1990–1994) |
| Australian Pro | 1954 | 1966 | Various locations | Grass | |
| Baden Baden International | 1896 | 1966 | Baden-Baden | Clay | Pre-open era (1877–1967) |
| Bahamas International | 1975 | | Nassau | Hard | Grand Prix |
| Baltimore International | 1972 | 1982 | Baltimore | Carpet | Grand Prix |
| Bangkok Tennis Classic | 1980 | 1982 | Bangkok | Carpet | Grand Prix |
| Belgian Open Championships | 1899 | 1981 | Brussels | Clay | Grand Prix |
| Benson & Hedges Classic | 1973 | 1974 | Christchurch | Carpet | Grand Prix |
| Berlin Open | 1973 | 1979 | Berlin | Clay | Grand Prix |
| Bermuda Open | 1975 | 1976 | Paget | Clay | Grand Prix |
| Birmingham Open | 1991 | | Birmingham | Carpet | ATP Tour |
| Boca West International | 1975 | 1976 | Boca Raton | Hard | Grand Prix |
| Boca West Open | 1984 | | Boca Raton | Hard | Grand Prix |
| Bologna Indoor | 1971 | 1981 | Bologna | Carpet | World Championship Tennis; Grand Prix |
| Bologna Outdoor | 1985 | 1998 | Bologna | Clay | Grand Prix; ATP Tour |
| Brasília Open | 1991 | | Brasília | Carpet | ATP Tour |
| Brighton International | 1996 | 2000 | Brighton | Carpet (1978–1995); Clay (1995–2000) | ATP Tour |
| Bristol Open | 1881 | 1989 | Bristol | Grass | Open era (1881–1967); World Championship Tennis (1971); Grand Prix (1980–1989) |
| Cacharel Caracas Open | 1982 | 1983 | Caracas | Hard | Grand Prix |
| Cairo Open | 1925 | 2002 | Cairo | Clay | Pre-open era (1925–1967); Grand Prix (1975–1982); Challenger circuit (1983–2002) |
| Calgary Indoor | 1973 | 1974 | Calgary | Carpet | USLTA Indoor Circuit |
| Campionati Internazionali di Sicilia | 1935 | 2006 | Palermo | Clay | ATP Tour |
| Carolinas International Tennis Tournament | 1971 | 1977 | Charlotte | Hard | Grand Prix |
| Cedar Grove Open | 1974 | | Cedar Grove | Hard | Grand Prix |
| Central California Open National Hardcourt Championships | 1971 | 1972 | Sacramento | Hard | Grand Prix |
| Chicago Grand Prix | 1985 | 1987 | Chicago | Carpet | Grand Prix |
| Chilean Open | 1976 | 1981 | Santiago | Clay | Grand Prix |
| Cologne Grand Prix | 1976 | 1986 | Cologne | Carpet | Grand Prix |
| Cologne Open | 1992 | | Cologne | Clay | ATP Tour |
| Colonial National Invitational | 1962 | 1973 | Fort Worth | Hard | WCT Tour |
| Columbus Open | 1971 | 1984 | Columbus | Clay (1971–1979); Hard (1980–1984) | Grand Prix |
| Copenhagen Open | 1973 | 2003 | Copenhagen | Carpet (1973–1999); Hard (2000–2003) | WCT Tour (1973); ATP Tour (1991–2003) |
| Dallas Open | 1983 | | Dallas | Hard | ATP Tour |
| Dayton Open | 1975 | 1980 | Dayton | Carpet | Grand Prix |
| Delray Beach WCT | 1982 | 1983 | Delray Beach | Clay | WCT Tour |
| Denver Open | 1972 | 1982 | Denver | Carpet | WCT Tour (1972–1976); Grand Prix (1977–1982) |
| Des Moines Open | 1972 | 1973 | Des Moines | Carpet | Grand Prix |
| Dewar Cup Aberavon | 1968 | 1973 | Aberavon | Carpet | Pre-open era (1968–1971); Grand Prix (1972–1973) |
| Dewar Cup Billingham | 1971 | 1973 | Billingham | Carpet | Grand Prix (1972–1973) |
| Dewar Cup Cardiff | 1974 | 1974 | cardiff | Carpet | Grand Prix (1972–1973) |
| Dewar Cup Edinburgh | 1968 | 1972 | Edinburgh | Carpet | ILTF Amateur Tour (1968–1969); Grand Prix (1972–1973); ITF Independent Tour (1968–1973) |
| Dewar Cup Finals | 1968 | 1976 | London | Carpet | Grand Prix (1970–1976) |
| Dewar Cup Perth | 1968 | 1969 | Perth | Carpet | Pre-open era (1968–1969) |
| Dewar Cup Stalybridge | 1965 | 1971 | Stalybridge | Carpet | Grand Prix |
| Dewar Cup Torquay | 1968 | 1972 | Torquay | Carpet | Grand Prix |
| Donnay Indoor Championships | 1981 | 1992 | Brussels | Carpet | Grand Prix (1980–1988); ATP Tour (1990–1992) |
| Düsseldorf Grand Prix | 1968 | 1977 | Düsseldorf | Clay | Grand Prix |
| Dutch Open | 1898 | 2008 | Hilversum (1957–1994); Amsterdam (1995–2001); Amersfoort (2002–2008) | Clay | Grand Prix (1970–1989); ATP Tour (1990–2008) |
| ECC Antwerp | 1982 | 1998 | Antwerp | Carpet (1982–1996); Hard (1997–1998) | World Series (1992–1994); ATP Championship Series (1996–1998) |
| Eurocard Open | 1988 | 2001 | Stuttgart (1990–1994, 1996–2001); Essen (1995) | Carpet (1990–1997); Hard (1998–2001) | ATP Championship Series (1990–1995); ATP Super 9 (1995–1999); Tennis Masters Series (2000–2001) |
| European Indoor Championships | 1990 | 1991 | Berlin | Carpet | ATP Tour |
| Fort Worth WCT | 1975 | 1976 | Fort Worth | Hard | World Championship Tennis |
| Frankfurt Cup | 1987 | 1989 | Frankfurt | Carpet | Grand Prix |
| Frankfurt Grand Prix | 1980 | 1982 | Frankfurt | Carpet | Grand Prix |
| French Covered Court Championships | 1895 | 1971 | Paris | Hard/Wood | Pre-open era (1877–1967) |
| Friendship Cup | 1979 | 1980 | San José | Hard | Grand Prix |
| Geneva Open | 1980, 2015 | 1991 | Geneva | Clay | Grand Prix (1980–1989); ATP Tour (1990–1991, 2015) |
| German Pro Championships | 1911 | 1952 | Berlin | Clay | Pro Tour |
| Grand Prix Cleveland | 1972 | 1985 | Cleveland | Hard | Grand Prix |
| Grand Slam Cup | 1990 | 1998 | Munich | Carpet | Grand Slam |
| Guadalajara Open | 1978 | | Guadalajara | Clay | Grand Prix |
| Guarujá Open | 1981 | 1992 | Guarujá | Carpet (1981); Clay (1982–1992) | Grand Prix (1981–1983, 1987–1989); ATP Tour (1990–1992) |
| GWA Mazda Tennis Classic | 1983 | 1985 | Brisbane | Carpet | Grand Prix |
| Hampton Grand Prix | 1971 | 1977 | Hampton | Hard | USLTA indoor circuit Grand Prix |
| Hawaii Open | 1974 | 1984 | Honolulu | Hard | Grand Prix |
| Hypo Group Tennis International | 1981 | 2008 | Pörtschach | Clay | ATP World Series (1990–1999); ATP International Series (2000–2008) |
| Indian Open | 1910 | 1982 | Various locations | Clay; Grass; Hard | Grand Prix |
| International Pro Championship of Britain | 1935 | 1939 | Southport | Clay | |
| International Tennis Championships of Colombia | 1977 | 1980 | Bogotá | Clay | Grand Prix |
| Irish Championships | 1879 | 1967 | Dublin | Grass | Pre-open era (1879–1967) |
| Irish Open | 1968 | 1983 | Dublin | Grass | Independent tour (1968–1969); Grand Prix (1970–1974) |
| Jacksonville Open | 1972 | | Jacksonville | Hard | USLTA Indoor Circuit |
| Jakarta Open | 1993 | 1996 | Jakarta | Hard | ATP Tour |
| Kansas City Open | 1972 | | Kansas City | Hard | Grand Prix |
| Kent Championships | 1886 | 1996 | London | Grass | |
| Khartoum International | 1976 | | Khartoum | Hard | Grand Prix |
| Kuala Lumpur Open | 1993 | 1995 | Kuala Lumpur | Hard (1993); Carpet (1994–1995) | ATP Tour |
| La Costa WCT | 1973 | 1977 | La Costa | Hard | WCT Tour |
| Lagos Open | 1976 | 1991 | Lagos | Clay; Hard | Challenger circuit |
| Laguna Niguel Classic | 1977 | | Laguna Niguel | Hard | Grand Prix |
| Lisbon Open | 1983 | | Lisbon | Clay | Grand Prix |
| Little Caesars Championship Tennis Tournament | 1988 | | Detroit | Carpet | Grand Prix |
| Livingston Open | 1984 | 1989 | Livingston | Hard | Grand Prix |
| Lorraine Open | 1979 | 1989 | Nancy (odd years); Metz (even years) | Carpet | Grand Prix |
| Louisville Open | 1970 | 1979 | Louisville | Hard | Grand Prix (1970, 1973–1979); WCT Tour (1971–1972) |
| Maceió Open | 1992 | | Maceió | Clay | ATP Tour |
| Macon Open | 1968 | 1972 | Macon | Carpet | Grand Prix |
| Madison Square Garden Pro | 1954 | 1969 | New York City | Hard | World Pro Tour |
| Madrid Tennis Grand Prix | 1972 | 1994 | Madrid | Clay | Grand Prix (1972–1989); ATP Tour (1990–1994) |
| Manchester Open | 1968 | 2009 | Manchester | Grass | Grand Prix (1970–1989); ATP Tour (1990–1994) |
| Mar del Plata Open | 1981 | | Mar del Plata | Clay | Grand Prix |
| Masters Pro | 1956 | 1965 | Los Angeles | Hard | |
| Melbourne Indoor | 1980 | 1985 | Melbourne | Carpet | Grand Prix |
| Melbourne Outdoor | 1983 | 1985 | Melbourne | Grass | Grand Prix |
| Merano Open | 1999 | | Meran | Clay | ATP Tour |
| Mexico City WCT | 1976 | 1982 | Mexico City | Carpet | WCT Tour |
| Milan Indoor | 1978 | 2005 | Milan (1978–1997, 2001–2005); London (1998–2000) | Carpet (1978–1999, 2001–2005); Hard (2000) | WCT Tour (1978–1980); Grand Prix (1981–1989); ATP Tour (1990–2005) |
| Monterrey WCT | 1976 | 1983 | Monterrey | Carpet | WCT Tour |
| Munich WCT | 1973 | 1983 | Munich | Carpet | WCT Tour |
| Napa Open | 1981 | | Napa | Grand Prix | |
| New Orleans Grand Prix | 1978 | 1980 | New Orleans | Carpet | Grand Prix |
| Newport Casino Invitational | 1915 | 1967 | Newport | Grass | Open era tennis |
| Northern Championships | 1880 | 1967 | Liverpool/Manchester | Grass | Pre-open era (1880–1967) |
| Nuremberg Open | 1976 | | Nuremberg | Carpet | Grand Prix |
| Oahu Open | 1994 | | Oahu | Hard | ATP Tour |
| Ocean City Open | 1977 | | Ocean City | Hard | Grand Prix |
| Omaha Open | 1972 | 1974 | Omaha | Hard | USLTA Indoor Circuit |
| Open de Nice Côte d'Azur | 1971 | 2016 | Nice | Clay | Grand Prix; ATP World Series; ATP World Tour 250 series |
| Oporto Open | 1995 | 1996 | Porto | Clay | ATP Tour |
| Oslo Open | 1974 | | Oslo | Hard | Grand Prix |
| Ostrava Open | 1994 | 1998 | Ostrava | Carpet | ATP Tour |
| OTB Open | 1985 | 1994 | Schenectady | Hard | Grand Prix; ATP Tour |
| Palm Harbor Open | 1980 | | Palm Harbor | Hard | Grand Prix |
| Pennsylvania Lawn Tennis Championships | 1894 | 1974 | Haverford | Grass (1894–1969, 1973–1974); Hard (1970–1972) | Grand Prix |
| Pepsi Grand Slam | 1976 | 1981 | Myrtle Beach (1976); Boca Raton (1977–1981) | Clay | Grand Prix |
| Perth Indoor Tennis Tournament | 1975 | 1977 | Perth | Hard | Grand Prix |
| Philippine International Tennis Tournament | 1973 | 1978 | Manila | Hard | Grand Prix |
| Phoenix Open | 1953 | 1970 | Phoenix | Hard | Amateur tour (1953–1967); Grand Prix (1968–1970) |
| Prague Open | 1987 | 1999 | Prague | Clay | Grand Prix (1987–1989); ATP Tour (1990–1999) |
| Prince's Club Championships | 1880 | 1883 | London | Grass | Pre-open era (1877–1967) |
| Quebec WCT | 1971 | 1973 | Quebec City | Hard | WCT Tour (1971–1972); Grand Prix (1973) |
| Queensland Open | 1888 | 1994 | Brisbane | Grass; Hard | Pre-open era (1888–1967); Grand Prix (1970–1992); WTA Tour (1973–1994) |
| Queen's Club Pro | 1927 | 1928 | London | Clay | Pre-open era |
| Quito Open | 1979 | 1982 | Quito | Clay | Grand Prix |
| Rainier International Tennis Classic | 1972 | 1973 | Seattle | Hard | Grand Prix |
| Richmond WCT | 1971 | 1984 | Richmond | Carpet | WCT Tour |
| Rio de Janeiro Open | 1989 | 1990 | Rio de Janeiro | Carpet | Grand Prix |
| Roanoke International Tennis Tournament | 1973 | 1975 | Roanoke | Indoor | Grand Prix |
| Rye Brook Open | 1987 | 1988 | Rye Brook, New York | Hard | Grand Prix |
| SA Tennis Open | 2009 | 2011 | Johannesburg | Hard | ATP World Tour 250 Series |
| Salt Lake City Open | 1973 | 1974 | Salt Lake City | Hard | USLTA Indoor Circuit |
| San Juan Open | 1980 | 1981 | San Juan | Hard | Grand Prix |
| San Marino GO&FUN Open | 1988 | 2014 | San Marino | Clay | ATP Challenger Tour |
| Sanremo Open | 1990 | | Sanremo | Clay | ATP Tour |
| São Paulo WCT | 1974 | 1976 | São Paulo | Carpet | WCT Tour |
| Scottish Championships | 1878 | 1994 | Various locations | Grass | Pre-open era (1877–1967); Open era (1968–1973) |
| Seoul Open | 1987 | 1996 | Seoul | Hard | Grand Prix (1987–1989); ATP Tour (1990–1996) |
| Serbia Open | 2009 | 2012 | Belgrade | Clay | ATP World Tour 250 Series |
| Shanghai Grass Court Championships | 1910 | 1948 | Shanghai | Grass | Pre-open era (1877–1967) |
| Singapore Open | 1989 | 1999 | Singapore | Hard | Grand Prix (1989); ATP Tour Series (1990–1992, 1996); ATP Championship Series (1997–1999) |
| Slazenger Pro Championships | 1946 | 1964 | Scarborough | Grass | Pro tour (1946–1964) |
| Sofia Open | 1980 | 1981 | Sofia | Carpet | Grand Prix |
| South African Open | 1891 | 2011 | Various locations | Hard | Pre-open era (1877–1967); Independent Open Tour era (1968–1971, 1974–1989); Grand Prix (1972–1989); Grand Prix Championship Series (1970–1974); WCT Tour (1983–1987); ATP Tour (1990–2011) |
| South of England Championships | 1881 | 1972 | Eastbourne | Grass | |
| South of France Championships | 1895 | 1971 | Nice | Clay | |
| South Orange Open | 1970 | 1983 | South Orange | Grass (1970–1974); Clay (1975–1983) | Grand Prix |
| South Pacific Tennis Classic | 1976 | 1981 | Brisbane | Grass | Grand Prix |
| Springfield International Tennis Classic | 1977 | 1978 | Springfield | Carpet | Grand Prix |
| St. Louis WCT | 1970 | 1978 | St. Louis | Carpet | WCT Tour |
| Stowe Open | 1978 | 1983 | Stowe, Vermont | Hard | Grand Prix |
| St. Petersburg WCT | 1974 | 1975 | St. Petersburg | Hard | WCT Tour |
| Surrey Championships | 1890 | 1981 | Surbiton | Grass | Grand Prix |
| Swedish Pro Tennis Championships | 1972 | 1973 | Gothenburg | Carpet | WCT Tour |
| Taipei Grand Prix | 1977, 1992 | 1984 | Taipei | Carpet | Grand Prix (1977–1984); ATP Tour (1992) |
| Tampa Open | 1981 | 1983 | Tampa | Hard (1981–1982); Carpet (1983) | Grand Prix |
| Tanglewood International Tennis Classic | 1971 | 1973 | Clemmons | Hard | Grand Prix |
| Tel Aviv Open | 1978 | 1996 | Ramat HaSharon | Hard | Grand Prix (1979–1981, 1983–1989) ATP Tour (1990–1996) |
| Tempe Open | 1974 | | Tempe | Hard | Grand Prix |
| Tennis Channel Open | 1986 | 2008 | Las Vegas | Hard | WCT Tour (1986–1989); International Series (1990–2008) |
| Tennis South Invitational | 1973 | 1977 | Jackson | Carpet | USLTA Indoor Circuit (1974); WCT Tour (1976); Grand Prix (1977) |
| The Homburg Cup | 1894 | 1935 | Bad Homburg vor der Höhe | Clay | Pre-open era (1877–1967) |
| Tokyo Indoor | 1966 | 1995 | Tokyo | Carpet | Grand Prix (1978–1989); ATP Tour (1990–1995) |
| Torneo Internazionale Citta di Treviso | 1984 | | Treviso | Carpet | |
| Toronto Indoor | 1971 | 1990 | Toronto | Carpet | WCT Tour (1972–1976); Grand Prix (1985–1986); ATP Tour (1990) |
| Tulsa Grand Prix Tennis Tournament | 1978 | 1980 | Tulsa | Hard | Grand Prix |
| Turkey Open | 1947 | 1975 | Istanbul | Clay | Pre-open era (1947–1967); ITF Independent tour (1968–1973); Grand Prix (1975) |
| U.S. National Indoor Tennis Championships | 1898 | 2014 | Memphis | Hard | ATP 500 (1898–2013); ATP 250 (2014); WTA International (1898–2013) |
| U.S. Pro Indoor | 1968 | 1998 | Philadelphia | Carpet (1968–1996); Hard (1997–1998) | WCT Tour (1968–1977); Championship Series (1970–1986); Grand Prix (1978–1989); ATP Tour (1990–1998) |
| U.S. Pro Tennis Championships | 1927 | 1999 | Various locations (United States) | Clay; Hard; Grass; Wood | USA Pro Tour (1927–1969); Grand Prix (1970–1989); ATP World Tour (1990–1999) |
| USTA Men's Clay Courts of Tampa | 1991 | 1993 | Tampa | Clay | ATP Tour |
| Vancouver WCT | 1970 | 1973 | Vancouver | Hard | WCT Circuit |
| Verizon Tennis Challenge | 1985 | 2001 | Fort Myers (1985–1986); Orlando (1987–1991); Atlanta (1992–2001) | Hard (1985–1991); Clay (1992–2001) | Grand Prix (1985–1989); ATP World Series (1990–1997); ATP International Series (1998–2001) |
| Victorian Championships | 1879 | 1971 | Melbourne | Grass | Pre-open era (1879–1967); Open era (1968–1971) |
| Volvo International | 1973 | 1998 | New Hampshire (1973–1984); Vermont (1985–1989); Connecticut (1990–1998) | Clay (1973–1984); Hard (1985–1998) | Grand Prix (1985–1989); ATP World Series (1990–1997); ATP International Series (1998) |
| Warsaw Open | 1995 | 2010 | Warsaw | Clay | WTA Tour |
| Washington Indoor | 1972 | 1980 | Washington, D.C. | Carpet | WCT Tour (1972–1976); Grand Prix (1977–1980) |
| WCT Challenge Cup | 1976 | 1980 | Various locations | Carpet | WCT Tour |
| WCT Chicago | 1982 | | Chicago | Carpet | WCT Tour |
| WCT Finals | 1971 | 1989 | Dallas | Carpet | WCT Tour |
| WCT Invitational | 1978 | 1981 | Forest Hills (1978–1979); Salisbury (1980–1981) | Clay (1978–1979); Carpet (1980–1981) | WCT Tour |
| WCT Miami Open | 1968 | 1978 | Miami | AstroTurf | Grand Prix |
| WCT Tournament of Champions | 1977 | 1990 | Various locations (United States) | Clay | WCT Tour |
| WCT World Doubles | 1973 | 1986 | Montreal (1973–1974); Mexico City (1975); Kansas City (1976–1978); London (1979–1982, 1984–1986); Birmingham (1983) | Carpet | WCT Tour |
| Wellington Classic | 1988 | 1992 | Wellington, New Zealand | Hard | WTA Tour |
| Welsh Championships | 1886 | 1974 | Various locations (Wales) | Grass | Pre-open era |
| Welsh Covered Court Championships | 1893 | 1955 | Llandudno | Hard | Pre-open era |
| Wembley Championships | 1934 | 1990 | London | Wood (1934–1967); Carpet (1968–1990) | Open era |
| World of Doubles | 1976 | 1982 | Woodlands | Hard | Grand Prix |
| World Team Cup | 1975 | 2012 | Düsseldorf | Clay | ATP World Tour |

=== Women ===
| Competition | Year debut | Last year | Host | Surface | Tour |
|---|---|---|---|---|---|
| Advanta Championships of Philadelphia | 1971 | 2005 | Philadelphia | Hard | WTA Tour |
| Amelia Island Championships | 1980 | 2010 | Amelia Island; Ponte Vedra Beach | Clay | WTA Tour |
| Ameritech Cup | 1971 | 1997 | Chicago | Carpet | WTA Tour |
| Athens Trophy | 1986 | 1990 | Athens | Clay | WTA Tour |
| Australian Hard Court Championships | 1938 | 2008 | Various locations (Australia) | Hard | Pre open era (1938–1967); Independent tour (1968–1969); Grand Prix (1970–1990); WTA Tour (1973–2008) |
| Avon Cup | 1983 | 1986 | Marco Island, Florida | Clay | WTA Tour |
| Bangkok Open | 2005 | 2007 | Bangkok | Hard | WTA Tour |
| Belgian Open | 1987 | 2001 | Various locations (Belgium) | Clay | WTA Tour |
| Borniquen Classic | 1977 | 1977 | San Juan, Puerto Rico | Hard | WTA Tour |
| Brasil Tennis Cup | 1977 | 2016 | Various locations (Brazil) | Hard | WTA Tour |
| Brighton International | 1978 | 1995 | Brighton | Carpet | WTA Tour |
| Cachantún Cup | 2008 | | Viña del Mar | Clay | WTA Tour |
| Central Fidelity Banks International | 1979 | 1984 | Richmond, Virginia | Carpet | WTA Tour |
| Chichester Tennis Tournament | 1970 | 1980 | Chichester | Grass | WTA Tour |
| Commonwealth Bank Tennis Classic | 1994 | 2008 | Bali | Hard | WTA Tour |
| Danamon Open | 1993 | 1997 | Jakarta | Hard | WTA Tour |
| Danone Australian Hardcourt Championships | 1987 | 1994 | Brisbane | Grass (1987–1988); Hard (1989–1994) | WTA Tour |
| Dewar Cup Aberavon | 1968 | 1973 | Aberavon | Carpet | Open era |
| Dewar Cup Billingham | 1971 | 1973 | Billingham | Carpet | Open era |
| Diamond Games | 2002 | 2009 | Antwerp | Hard | WTA Tour |
| Dreamland Egypt Classic | 1999 | | Cairo | Clay | WTA Tour |
| Eckerd Open | 1971 | 1990 | Tampa, Florida | Clay (1971–1974, 1987–1990); Hard (1977–1986) | WTA Tour |
| Edinburgh Cup | 1971 | 1977 | Edinburgh | Grass | WTA Tour |
| Faber Grand Prix | 1992 | 2000 | Essen (1992–1996); Hanover (1997–2000) | Carpet | WTA Tour |
| Forest Hills Tennis Classic | 2004 | 2008 | Forest Hills, Queens, New York City | Hard | WTA Tour |
| Freiburg Open | 1983 | | Freiburg | Clay | WTA Tour |
| Gaz de France Stars | 2004 | 2006 | Hasselt | Hard | WTA Tour |
| Grand Slam Cup | 1998 | 1999 | Munich | Carpet (1990–1997); Hard (1998–1999) | WTA Tour |
| Hilversum Trophy | 1985 | 1986 | Hilversum | Carpet | WTA Tour |
| Internazionali di Modena | 2005 | | Modena | Clay | WTA Tour |
| Irish Open | 1879 | 1983 | Dublin | Grass (1879–1939, 1966–1983); Clay (1946–1965) | Pre open era (1879–1967); Independent tour (1968–1969); Grand Prix (1970–1974); WTA Tour (1971–1983) |
| Lion's Cup | 1978 | 1985 | Tokyo | Carpet | WTA Tour |
| Maybelline Classic | 1980 | 1985 | Deerfield Beach, Florida (1980–1983); Fort Lauderdale, Florida (1984–1985) | Hard | WTA Tour |
| Nichirei International Championships | 1990 | 1996 | Tokyo | Hard | WTA Tour |
| Oslo Open | 1991 | | Oslo | Carpet | WTA Tour |
| Pittsburgh Open | 1979 | 1984 | Pittsburgh, Pennsylvania | Carpet | WTA Tour |
| Porto Open | 2001 | 2002 | Porto | Hard | WTA Tour |
| Prague Open | 1992 | 2010 | Prague | Clay | WTA Tour |
| Puerto Rico Open | 1986 | 1995 | San Juan, Puerto Rico | Hard | WTA Tour |
| Sarasota Clay Court Classic | 2002 | 2003 | Sarasota, Florida | Clay | WTA Tour |
| Shanghai Grass Court Championships | 1910 | 1948 | Shanghai | Grass | Pre-open era (1877–1967) |
| Sparkassen Cup | 1990 | 2003 | Leipzig | Carpet | WTA Tour |
| Sunfeast Open | 2005 | 2008 | Kolkata | Hard | WTA Tour |
| Taipei Women's Championships | 1986 | 1994 | Taipei | Hard | WTA Tour |
| Thunderbird Classic | 1971 | 1980 | Phoenix, Arizona | Hard | WTA Tour |
| Toyota Championships | 1977 | 1982 | Palm Springs, California; Landover, Maryland; East Rutherford, New Jersey | Carpet | WTA Tour |
| Toyota Princess Cup | 1997 | 2002 | Tokyo | Hard | WTA Tour |
| U.S. Women's Clay Court Championships | 1912 | 1986 | Various locations (United States) | Clay | Grand Prix (1971–1972); WTA Tour (1973–1986) |
| U.S. Women's Indoor Championships | 1907 | 2001 | Various locations (United States) | Hard | WTA Tour |
| Virginia Slims of Akron | 1973 | 1976 | Akron, Ohio | Carpet | WTA Tour |
| Virginia Slims of Albuquerque | 1989 | 1991 | Albuquerque, New Mexico | Hard | WTA Tour |
| Virginia Slims of Arkansas | 1986 | 1987 | Little Rock, Arkansas | Carpet | WTA Tour |
| Virginia Slims of Columbus | 1972 | 1973 | Columbus, Ohio | Grass | WTA Tour |
| Virginia Slims of Dallas | 1972 | 1989 | Dallas | Carpet | WTA Tour |
| Virginia Slims of Denver | 1972 | 1991 | Denver | Hard (1972–1984); Carpet (1985–1991) | WTA Tour |
| Virginia Slims of Detroit | 1972 | 1983 | Detroit | Carpet | WTA Tour |
| Virginia Slims of Florida | 1984 | 1995 | Various locations (United States) | Hard | WTA Tour |
| Virginia Slims of Fort Lauderdale | 1971 | 1974 | Fort Lauderdale, Florida | Clay | WTA Tour |
| Virginia Slims of Hawaii | 1973 | | Honolulu | Hard | WTA Tour |
| Virginia Slims of Hollywood | 1977 | 1979 | Hollywood, Florida | Carpet | WTA Tour |
| Virginia Slims of Houston | 1970 | 1995 | Houston, Texas | Carpet (1970–1984); Clay (1985–1995) | WTA Tour |
| Virginia Slims of Indianapolis | 1972 | 1992 | Indianapolis | Carpet (1972–1985); Hard (1986–1992) | WTA Tour |
| Virginia Slims of Jacksonville | 1972 | 1973 | Jacksonville, Florida | Clay | WTA Tour |
| Virginia Slims of Kansas | 1978 | 1990 | Kansas City, Kansas (1978–1983); Wichita, Kansas (1986–1990) | Carpet (1978–1987); Hard (1988–1990) | WTA Tour |
| Virginia Slims of Nashville | 1973 | 1991 | Nashville, Tennessee | Hard | WTA Tour |
| Virginia Slims of New England | 1986 | 1990 | Worcester, Massachusetts | Carpet | WTA Tour |
| Virginia Slims of New Orleans | 1984 | 1988 | New Orleans | Carpet | WTA Tour |
| Virginia Slims of Newport | 1971 | 1990 | Newport, Rhode Island | Grass | WTA Tour |
| Virginia Slims of Pennsylvania | 1983 | 1986 | Hershey, Pennsylvania | Carpet | WTA Tour |
| Virginia Slims of St. Louis | 1973 | | St. Louis, Missouri | Hard | WTA Tour |
| Virginia Slims of Tucson | 1972 | 1973 | Tucson, Arizona | Carpet | WTA Tour |
| Virginia Slims of Washington | 1972 | 1991 | Washington, D.C. | Carpet | WTA Tour |
| Vitosha New Otani Open | 1988 | 1989 | Sofia | Hard (1988); Clay (1989) | WTA Tour |
| Waikoloa Championships | 2001 | 2002 | Waikoloa Village, Hawai'i | Hard | WTA Tour |
| Warsaw Open | 1995 | 2010 | Warsaw | Clay | WTA Tour |
| Wellington Classic | 1988 | 1992 | Wellington | Hard | WTA Tour |
| Welsh International Open | 1997 | | Cardiff | Clay | WTA Tour |
| Wightman Cup | 1923 | 1989 | Various locations (United Kingdom and United States) | Grass | |
| WTA Argentine Open | 1986 | 1987 | Buenos Aires | Clay | WTA Tour |
| WTA Atlanta | 1975 | 1983 | Atlanta | Carpet (1975–1981); Hard (1982–1983) | WTA Tour |
| WTA Austrian Open | 1968 | 2015 | Various locations (Austria) | Clay | International |
| WTA Bayonne | 1989 | 1992 | Bayonne | Hard | WTA Tour |
| WTA Bratislava | 1999 | 2002 | Bratislava | Hard | WTA Tour |
| WTA Düsseldorf Open | 1973 | | Düsseldorf | Clay | WTA Tour |
| WTA Knokke-Heist | 1999 | 2002 | Knokke (1999–2001); Brussels (2002) | Clay | WTA Tour |
| WTA Montreal | 1978 | 1980 | Montreal | Hard | WTA Tour |
| WTA Nagoya | 1995 | | Nagoya | Carpet | WTA Tour |
| WTA New Jersey | 1978 | 1989 | Mahwah, New Jersey | Hard | WTA Tour |
| WTA Sapporo | 1993 | | Sapporo | Carpet | WTA Tour |
| WTA Seattle | 1977 | 1982 | Seattle, Washington | Carpet | WTA Tour |
| WTA Singapore Open | 1986 | 1994 | Singapore | Hard | WTA Tour |
| WTA South Carolina | 1985 | 1987 | Seabrook Island | Clay | WTA Tour |
| Thailand Open | 1991 | 2015 | Pattaya | Hard | WTA Tour |
| Zurich Open | 1984 | 2008 | Zürich | Hard | WTA Tour |
