= 2005 Internazionali di Modena – Doubles =

Doubles
- 2005 Internazionali di Modena

Final
- Champions: (Ukraine) Yuliya Beygelzimer (Bosnia and Herzegovina) Mervana Jugić-Salkić
- Runners-up: (Czech Republic) Gabriela Navrátilová (Czech Republic) Michaela Paštiková
- Score: 6–2, 6–0

Events
Singles	Doubles
Internazionali di Modena

This was the first edition of the tournament, so no defending champions were declared.

Yuliya Beygelzimer and Mervana Jugić-Salkić won the title, defeating Gabriela Navrátilová and Michaela Paštiková 6–2, 6–0 in the final. It was the 2nd doubles title for Beygelzimer and the 2nd and final doubles title for Jugić-Salkić, in their respective careers.

== Seeds ==
1. (Czech Republic) Gabriela Navrátilová / (Czech Republic) Michaela Paštiková (final)
2. (France) Émilie Loit / (China) Yan Zi (first round)
3. (Switzerland) Emmanuelle Gagliardi / (Spain) Marta Marrero (semifinals)
4. (Italy) Maria Elena Camerin / (Italy) Tathiana Garbin (quarterfinals, withdrew due to a right shoulder tendonitis on Camerin)

== Draw ==
=== Key ===
- Q = Qualifier
- WC = Wild card
- LL = Lucky loser
- Alt = Alternate
- SE = Special exempt
- PR = Protected ranking
- ITF = ITF entry
- JE = Junior exempt
- w/o = Walkover
- r = Retired
- d = Defaulted
- SR = Special ranking

First round
1	(Czech Republic) G Navrátilová (Czech Republic) M Paštiková	6	6
(France) S Cohen-Aloro (Tunisia) S Sfar	4	3
(Ukraine) A Bondarenko (Germany) M Weingärtner	1	7	5
(Germany) J Schruff (Germany) J Wöhr	6	5	7
3	(Switzerland) E Gagliardi (Spain) M Marrero	7^{7}	6
(Poland) K Jans (Poland) A Rosolska	6^{5}	4
WC	(Italy) Giovanna di Lauro (Italy) F Schiavone	3	7	4
Q	(Belarus) T Poutchek (Belarus) A Yakimova	6	5	6
(Spain) RM Andrés Rodríguez (Romania) A Vanc	6	6
(Austria) D Klemenschits (Austria) S Klemenschits	4	3
(Czech Republic) L Hradecká (Czech Republic) V Uhlířová	3	6	1
4	(Italy) ME Camerin (Italy) T Garbin	6	2	6
(Poland) M Domachowska (Croatia) J Kostanić	4	6	6
(United Kingdom) C Curran (Australia) T Musgrave	6	3	4
(Ukraine) Y Beygelzimer (Bosnia and Herzegovina) M Jugić-Salkić	6	6
2	(France) É Loit (China) Z Yan	3	4

Quarterfinals
1	(Czech Republic) G Navrátilová (Czech Republic) M Paštiková	6	6
(Germany) J Schruff (Germany) J Wöhr	2	2
3	(Switzerland) E Gagliardi (Spain) M Marrero	6	7
Q	(Belarus) T Poutchek (Belarus) A Yakimova	1	5
(Spain) RM Andrés Rodríguez (Romania) A Vanc	w/o
4	(Italy) ME Camerin (Italy) T Garbin
(Poland) M Domachowska (Croatia) J Kostanić	4	3
(Ukraine) Y Beygelzimer (Bosnia and Herzegovina) M Jugić-Salkić	6	6

Semifinals
1	(Czech Republic) G Navrátilová (Czech Republic) M Paštiková	6^{5}	6	6
3	(Switzerland) E Gagliardi (Spain) M Marrero	7^{7}	2	3
(Spain) RM Andrés Rodríguez (Romania) A Vanc	2	5
(Ukraine) Y Beygelzimer (Bosnia and Herzegovina) M Jugić-Salkić	6	7

Final
1	(Czech Republic) G Navrátilová (Czech Republic) M Paštiková	2	0
(Ukraine) Y Beygelzimer (Bosnia and Herzegovina) M Jugić-Salkić	6	6
