= 2005 Internazionali di Modena – Singles =

Singles
- 2005 Internazionali di Modena

Final
- Champion: (Israel) Anna Smashnova
- Runner-up: (Italy) Tathiana Garbin
- Score: 6–6^{(3–0)}, retired

Events
| Singles | Doubles |
| Internazionali di Modena |

This was the first edition of the tournament, so no defending champions were declared.

Anna Smashnova won the title, defeating Tathiana Garbin in the final. Smashnova was leading 3–0 on the first set tiebreak, when Garbin suffered a heat illness during the match and decided to retire. It was the first title of the year for Smashnova and the 16th of her career.

== Seeds ==
1. (Italy) Francesca Schiavone (quarterfinals)
2. (Italy) Flavia Pennetta (semifinals)
3. (Czech Republic) ~~Klára Koukalová~~ (withdrew due to an illness)
4. (Poland) Marta Domachowska (first round)
5. (Israel) Anna Smashnova (champion)
6. (Croatia) Jelena Kostanić (second round)
7. (Italy) Antonella Serra Zanetti (first round)
8. (Argentina) Mariana Díaz Oliva (quarterfinals)
9. (Italy) ~~Maria Elena Camerin~~ (withdrew due to a right shoulder tendonitis)

== Draw ==
=== Key ===
- Q = Qualifier
- WC = Wild card
- LL = Lucky loser
- Alt = Alternate
- SE = Special exempt
- PR = Protected ranking
- ITF = ITF entry
- JE = Junior exempt
- w/o = Walkover
- r = Retired
- d = Defaulted
- SR = Special ranking

=== Finals ===
Semifinals
Q | (Hungary) Ágnes Szávay | 3 | 0
(Italy) Tathiana Garbin | 6 | 6
5 | (Israel) Anna Smashnova | 7 | 6
WC/2 | (Italy) Flavia Pennetta | 5 | 3

Final
(Italy) Tathiana Garbin | 6^{0r}
5 | (Israel) Anna Smashnova | 6^{3}

=== Top half ===
First round
WC/1 | (Italy) F Schiavone | 6 | 6
(Germany) M Weingärtner | 3 | 2
Q | (Hungary) M Czink | 6 | 5 | 3
(Spain) M Marrero | 0 | 7 | 6
(Slovakia) L Cervanová | 1 | 3
(Czech Republic) Z Ondrášková | 6 | 6
Q | (Hungary) Á Szávay | 6 | 6
LL | (Belarus) A Yakimova | 2 | 4
4 | (Poland) M Domachowska | 6 | 6^{5} | 1
(China) Z Yan | 2 | 7^{7} | 6
(Croatia) S Mamić | 6 | 6
(Switzerland) E Gagliardi | 1 | 4
(France) S Cohen-Aloro | 4 | 0
(Italy) T Garbin | 6 | 6
Q | (Czech Republic) K Böhmová | 5 | 1
6 | (Croatia) J Kostanić | 7 | 6

Second round
WC/1 | (Italy) F Schiavone | 6 | 6
(Spain) M Marrero | 0 | 0
(Czech Republic) Z Ondrášková | 3 | 1
Q | (Hungary) Á Szávay | 6 | 6
(China) Z Yan | 4 | 7 | 3
(Croatia) S Mamić | 6 | 5 | 6
(Italy) T Garbin | 6 | 6
6 | (Croatia) J Kostanić | 2 | 3

Quarterfinals
WC/1 | (Italy) F Schiavone | 1 | 4
Q | (Hungary) Á Szávay | 6 | 6
(Croatia) S Mamić | 6 | 6^{5} | 6^{4}
(Italy) T Garbin | 4 | 7^{7} | 7^{7}

Semifinals
Q | (Hungary) Á Szávay | 3 | 0
(Italy) T Garbin | 6 | 6

=== Bottom half ===
First round
7 | (Italy) An Serra Zanetti | 4 | 1
LL | (Russia) E Bychkova | 6 | 6
(Ukraine) A Bondarenko | 2 | 3
(France) É Loit | 6 | 6
(Spain) A Parra Santonja | 6 | 6
(Czech Republic) M Paštiková | 2 | 4
WC | (Italy) Ad Serra Zanetti | 3 | 1
5 | (Israel) A Smashnova | 6 | 6
8 | (Argentina) M Díaz Oliva | 7^{7} | 6
(Germany) J Schruff | 6^{5} | 1
(Slovakia) M Suchá | 6 | 6
(Spain) M Sánchez Lorenzo | 2 | 3
(Slovenia) M Matevžič | 3 | 1
Q | (Russia) E Vesnina | 6 | 6
(Spain) V Ruano Pascual | 2 | 7^{9} | 6^{2}
WC/2 | (Italy) F Pennetta | 6 | 6^{7} | 7^{7}

Second round
LL | (Russia) E Bychkova | 6 | 3 | 3
(France) É Loit | 1 | 6 | 6
(Spain) A Parra Santonja | 4 | 0
5 | (Israel) A Smashnova | 6 | 6
8 | (Argentina) M Díaz Oliva | 2 | 7^{10} | 6
(Slovakia) M Suchá | 6 | 6^{8} | 3
Q | (Russia) E Vesnina | 6^{3} | 2
WC/2 | (Italy) F Pennetta | 7^{7} | 6

Quarterfinals
(France) É Loit | 1 | 4
5 | (Israel) A Smashnova | 6 | 6
8 | (Argentina) M Díaz Oliva | 0 | 2
WC/2 | (Italy) F Pennetta | 6 | 6

Semifinals
5 | (Israel) A Smashnova | 7 | 6
WC/2 | (Italy) F Pennetta | 5 | 3
