= Dewar Cup Port Talbot =

Indoor tennis championship

Defunct tennis tournament
- Tour: Grand Prix circuit (1972-73)
- Founded: 1972
- Abolished: 1972
- Editions: 1
- Location: Port Talbot, Wales
- Surface: Carpet / indoor

The Dewar Cup Port Talbot was an indoor tennis event held one time and played at Port Talbot, Wales as part of the Dewar Cup circuit of indoor tournaments held throughout the United Kingdom.

== Finals ==
=== Men's singles ===
Year	Champions	Runners-up	Score
1972	(West Germany) Jürgen Fassbender	(United States) Clark Graebner	6–0, 6–2

=== Women's singles ===
Year	Champions	Runners-up	Score
1972	(Australia) Margaret Court	(United Kingdom) Virginia Wade	6-3, 6–4

=== Women's doubles ===
Year	Champions	Runners-up	Score
1972	(Australia) Margaret Smith Court (United Kingdom) Virginia Wade	(United States) Julie Heldman (Netherlands) Betty Stöve	6-0 6–3
