= Dewar Cup circuit =

Defunct tennis tournament
- Event name: Dewar Cup circuit (1965–76)
- Tour: ILTF European Circuit, (1968–69); Grand Prix circuit, (1970–76); WTA Tour, (1973–76)
- Founded: 1968
- Abolished: 1976
- Location: Aberavon, Wales; Billingham, England; Cardiff, Wales; Edinburgh, Scotland; London, England; Nottingham, England; Perth, Scotland; Stalybridge, England; Torquay, England
- Surface: Carpet / indoor

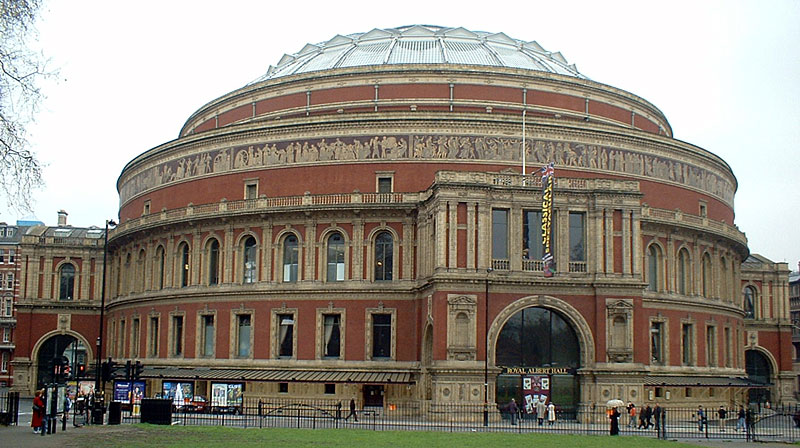
Event venue

The Dewar Cup circuit was a series tour of British indoor tennis tournaments sponsored by the Scottish whisky firm John Dewar & Sons from 1968 to 1976.

== History ==
The Dewar Cup circuit were held continuously throughout the autumn, normally October through to November each of the individual events were stand alone tournaments, but formed part of a particular leg of the tour for that season e.g. first leg, second leg, third leg and fourth leg. The tournaments featured both men's and women's singles and doubles and mixed doubles competition awarding prize money, players were also awarded qualifying points for the climax of the tour, and were staged as the Dewar Cup Finals, initially held at the Crystal Palace, London for the first two years, they then moved to the Royal Albert Hall in 1970 through till 1976, by which time the circuit had declined to the one main event for 1975 and 1976.

== Circuit tournaments ==
- Dewar Cup Aberavon
- Dewar Cup Billingham
- Dewar Cup Cardiff
- Dewar Cup Edinburgh
- Dewar Cup Nottingham
- Dewar Cup Finals
- Dewar Cup Perth
- Dewar Cup Port Talbot
- Dewar Cup Stalybridge
- Dewar Cup Torquay
