= Stalybridge Open =

Defunct tennis tournament
- Tour: ILTF World Circuit (1968–1969) men (1968–1971) women ILTF Independent Circuit (1970–1971) men
- Founded: 1968; 57 years ago
- Abolished: 1971; 54 years ago
- Location: Stalybridge, Great Britain
- Venue: Priory Tennis Club
- Surface: Clay / outdoor

The Stalybridge Open was a men's and women's clay court tennis tournament founded in 1968 as the Stalybridge International Tennis Tournament. In 1970 the tournament was branded as the En-Tout-Cas Trophy Stalybridge, (for sponsorship reasons) that year and was second leg of the En-Tout-Cas Circuit that year. The tournament was played at the Priory Tennis Club (f.1921), Stalybridge, Great Britain until 1971.

== Finals ==
=== Men's singles ===
(incomplete roll)

Year	Winners	Runners-up	Score
↓ ILTF World Circuit ↓
1968	(United Kingdom) Bobby Wilson	(Chile) Luis Ayala	4–6, 6–4, 6–4.
↓ Open Era ↓
1969	(United Kingdom) Stanley Matthews	(France) Patrick Proisy	6–2, 9–7.
↓ ILTF Independent Circuit ↓
1970	(United Kingdom) John de Mendoza	(Czechoslovakia) Jan Kukal	7–5, 6–1.
1971	(Italy) Ezio Di Matteo	(South Africa) Pat Cramer	6–4, 8–6.

=== Women's singles ===
(incomplete roll)

Year	Winners	Runners-up	Score
↓ ILTF World Circuit ↓
1968	(South Africa) Annette Van Zyl	(United States) Valerie Ziegenfuss	6–4, 6–8, 6–2
↓ Open Era ↓
1969	(United Kingdom) Joyce Williams	(Australia) Kerry Harris	2–6, 6–4, 7–5
1970	(United Kingdom) Joyce Williams (2)	(Australia) Evonne Goolagong	6–2, 6–3
1971	(Colombia) Isabel Fernández de Soto	(Rhodesia) Daphne Pattison	6–3, 6–2

== See also ==
- Stalybridge Covered Courts (indoor tennis tournament) 1965–1967.
- Dewar Cup Stalybridge (indoor tennis tournament) 1968–1971.
