= Internazionali di Modena =

Defunct tennis tournament
- Tour: WTA Tour
- Founded: 2005
- Abolished: 2005
- Location: Modena, Italy
- Category: Tier IV
- Surface: Clay
- Draw: 32S / 16D / 32QS / 4QD
- Prize money: USD140,000

The Internazionali di Modena was a tennis tournament held in Modena, Italy. Held once, in 2005, this WTA Tour event was played on outdoor claycourts.

== Past finals ==
=== Singles ===
| Year | Champion | Runner-up | Score |
|---|---|---|---|
| 2005 | (Israel) Anna Smashnova | (Italy) Tathiana Garbin | 6–6^{(3–0)}, retired |

=== Doubles ===
| Year | Champions | Runners-up | Score |
|---|---|---|---|
| 2005 | (Ukraine) Yuliya Beygelzimer (Bosnia and Herzegovina) Mervana Jugić-Salkić | (Czech Republic) Gabriela Navrátilová (Czech Republic) Michaela Paštiková | 6–2, 6–0 |

== See also ==
- Internazionali di Tennis Emilia Romagna
- List of tennis tournaments
