= Shanghai Grass Court Championships =

Defunct tennis tournament
- Founded: 1910; 115 years ago
- Abolished: 1948; 77 years ago
- Location: Shanghai, Republic of China
- Venue: Shanghai Lawn Tennis Club
- Surface: Grass

The Shanghai Grass Court Championships originally called the Shanghai Lawn Tennis Championships was a tennis tournament established in 1910. It was staged at the Shanghai Lawn Tennis Club, Shanghai, Republic of China and ran through until 1948 when it was abolished.

== History ==
The Shanghai Lawn Tennis Championships were first held circa 1910 and were organised by the Shanghai Lawn Tennis Association. The very earliest editions of the tournament did not feature open events for women. The championships tended to attract foreign players living in Shanghai mainly from Canada, France, Great Britain and Portugal. It also attracted Chinese players from other cities in Eastern China. The championships continued to be held until 1948 when it was abolished due to the ongoing Chinese Civil War.

== Other tournaments ==
- North China Open Championships, Tientsin Lawn Tennis Club.
- Shanghai Hard Court Championships.
