= Ocean City Open =

Defunct tennis tournament

The Ocean City Open is a defunct tennis tournament that was played on the USTA Circuit that was part of the ITF World Circuit in 1977 and 1978. Also known by its official sponsored name the Ocean City CBS Invitational. The event was held in Ocean City, Maryland. Vitas Gerulaitis won the first singles title while Alex Metreveli and Bill Scanlon partnered to win the doubles title. The 1978 singles final was won by Balazs Taroczy who defeated Ray Moore.

== Finals ==
=== Singles ===
Year	Champion	Runner-up	Score
1977	(United States) Vitas Gerulaitis	(United States) Robert Lutz	3–6, 6–1, 6–2

=== Doubles ===
Year	Champion	Runner-up	Score
1977	(Soviet Union) Alex Metreveli (United States) Bill Scanlon	(United States) John McEnroe (United States) Cliff Richey	7–6, 6–3
