= Dewar Cup Finals =

Defunct tennis tournament
- Event name: Dewar Cup London
- Tour: Grand Prix circuit (1970–76)
- Founded: 1968
- Abolished: 1976
- Editions: 9
- Location: London, England
- Venue: Crystal Palace National Sports Centre; Royal Albert Hall
- Surface: Carpet / indoor

The Dewar Cup Finals also known as the Dewar Cup London was an indoor tennis event held from 1968 through 1976 or London 3 its ATP designation. For the initial two years staged at the Crystal Palace National Sports Centre and subsequently at the Royal Albert Hall, it served as the penultimate event of the Dewar Cup circuit of tournaments with the winners of each leg of the circuit qualifying for this final playoff competition.

== Past finals ==
=== Men's singles ===
| Year | Champions | Runners-up | Score |
|---|---|---|---|
| 1968 | (United States) Stan Smith | (United Kingdom) Mark Cox | 6–4, 6–4 |
| 1969 | (United Kingdom) Mark Cox | (South Africa) Bob Hewitt | 4–6, 9–7, 6–2 |
| 1970 | (Australia) John Alexander | (United States) Tom Gorman | 5–7, 7–6, 7–6 |
| 1971 | (United Kingdom) Gerald Battrick | (South Africa) Bob Hewitt | 6–3, 6–4 |
| 1972 | (Romania) Ilie Năstase | (United States) Tom Gorman | 0–6, 6–1, 6–3 |
| 1973 | (Netherlands) Tom Okker | (Romania) Ilie Năstase | 6–3, 6–4 |
| 1974 | (United States) Jimmy Connors | (United States) Brian Gottfried | 6–2, 7–6 |
| 1975 | (United States) Eddie Dibbs | (United States) Jimmy Connors | 1–6, 6–1 7–5 |
| 1976 | (Mexico) Raúl Ramírez | (Spain) Manuel Santana | 6–3, 6–4 |

=== Women's singles ===
| Year | Champions | Runners-up | Score |
|---|---|---|---|
| 1968 | (United Kingdom) Virginia Wade | (Australia) Margaret Smith Court | 6–3, 6–4 |
| 1969 | (United Kingdom) Virginia Wade (2) | (United States) Julie Heldman | 6–4, 6–1 |
| 1970 | (France) Françoise Dürr | (United Kingdom) Ann Haydon-Jones | 7–6, 2–6, 6–2 |
| 1971 | (United Kingdom) Virginia Wade (3) | (United States) Julie Heldman | 6–1, 6–3 |
| 1972 | (Australia) Margaret Smith Court | (United Kingdom) Virginia Wade | 6–1, 6–1 |
| 1973 | (United Kingdom) Virginia Wade (4) | (United States) Julie Heldman | 7–6, 6–2 |
| 1974 | (United Kingdom) Virginia Wade (5) | (United States) Julie Heldman | 7–6, 6–2 |
| 1975 | (United Kingdom) Virginia Wade (6) | (Australia) Evonne Goolagong | 6–3, 6–1 |
| 1976 | (United Kingdom) Virginia Wade (7) | (United States) Chris Evert | 6–3, 6–1 |

=== Men's doubles ===
| Year | Champions | Runners-up | Score |
|---|---|---|---|
| 1972 | (Poland) Wojciech Fibak (West Germany) Karl Meiler | (United States) Jimmy Connors (Romania) Ilie Năstase | 6–1, 7–5 |
| 1973 | (Australia) Owen Davidson (United Kingdom) Mark Cox | (United Kingdom) Gerald Battrick (United Kingdom) Graham Stilwell | 6–4, 8–6 |
| 1974 | (United States) Jimmy Connors (Romania) Ilie Năstase | (United States) Brian Gottfried (Mexico) Raúl Ramírez | 3–6, 7–6, 6–3 |
| 1975 | (Poland) Wojciech Fibak (West Germany) Karl Meiler | (United States) Jimmy Connors (Romania) Ilie Năstase | 6–1, 7–5 |
| 1976 | (United Kingdom) John Lloyd (United Kingdom) David Lloyd | (United Kingdom) John Feaver (Australia) John James | 6–4, 3–6, 6–2 |

=== Women's doubles ===
| Year | Champions | Runners-up | Score |
|---|---|---|---|
| 1968 | (Australia) Margaret Smith Court (South Africa) Pat Walkden | (United States) Mary-Ann Eisel (United Kingdom) Winnie Shaw | 4–6, 6–3, 6–4 |
| 1969 | (United Kingdom) Ann Haydon-Jones (United Kingdom) Virginia Wade | (South Africa) Annette Van Zyl (United Kingdom) Joyce Barclay | 7–5, 3–6, 6–2 |
| 1970 | (United Kingdom) Ann Haydon-Jones (United Kingdom) Virginia Wade | (United Kingdom) Winnie Shaw (United Kingdom) Joyce Barclay | 1–6, 7–6, 7–6 |
| 1971 | (Australia) Evonne Goolagong (United States) Julie Heldman | (France) Françoise Dürr (United Kingdom) Virginia Wade | 7–5, 6–4 |
| 1972 | (Australia) Margaret Smith Court (United Kingdom) Virginia Wade | (South Africa) Brenda Kirk (United States) Sharon Walsh | 6–1, 6–4 |
| 1973 | (United Kingdom) Lesley Charles (United Kingdom) Glynis Coles | (Romania) Virginia Ruzici (Romania) Mariana Simionescu | 6–3, 7–5 |
| 1974 | (United Kingdom) Virginia Wade (United States) Sharon Walsh | (United Kingdom) Lesley Charles (United Kingdom) Sue Mappin | 6–2, 6–7, 6–2 |
| 1975 | (France) Françoise Dürr (Netherlands) Betty Stöve | (Australia) Evonne Goolagong (United Kingdom) Virginia Wade | 6–4, 7–6 |
| 1976 | (Netherlands) Betty Stöve (United Kingdom) Virginia Wade | (United States) Rosie Casals (United States) Chris Evert | 6–3, 2–6, 6–3 |
