= Dewar Cup Edinburgh =

Defunct tennis tournament
- Tour: ILTF Mens Amateur Tour (1913–1967); ILTF Women's Amateur Tour (1913–1967); ITF Mens Independent Tour (1968–1974); ITF Independent Tour (1968–1974)
- Founded: 1968
- Abolished: 1972
- Editions: 5
- Location: Edinburgh, Scotland, Great Britain
- Venue: Meadowbank Sports Centre
- Surface: Indoor (carpet)

The Dewar Cup Edinburgh was an indoor men's and women's tennis event held from 1968 to 1972, and played in Edinburgh, Scotland as part of the second leg of Dewar Cup Circuit of indoor tournaments held throughout the United Kingdom.

== History ==
The Dewar Cup Edinburgh was a men's women's professional tennis tournament, held from 1968 to 1974 in Edinburgh, Scotland. The tournament was not part of the Women's Tennis Association (WTA) Tour, but is listed, albeit as a non-tour event, in the WTA's Tour's history section. However it was part of the International Tennis Federations independent tournaments tour. Virginia Wade, later a Wimbledon champion, was the only Briton to win a title at the tournament, and was also the event's most successful player, with two wins in the singles and doubles.

== Finals ==
=== Men's singles ===
Year	Champions	Runners-up	Score
1970	(United States) Tom Gorman	(United Kingdom) Geoff Paish	6–2, 6–0.
1972	(South Africa) Ray Moore	(South Africa) Pat Cramer	6–4, 4–6, 6–4
1973	(United Kingdom) Roger Taylor	(United Kingdom) John Feaver	2–6, 7–5, 6–4
1974	(United Kingdom) Mark Cox	(United Kingdom) John Feaver	6–2 5–7 6–4

=== Men's doubles ===
Year	Champions	Runners-up	Score
1970	(Romania) Ion Țiriac (Czechoslovakia) Vladimír Zedník	(Australia) John Alexander (United States) Tom Gorman	6–4, 9–7

=== Women's singles ===
Year	Champion	Runner-up	Score
1970	(United States) Sharon Walsh	(United Kingdom) Winnie Shaw	6–2, 8–6
1971	(Australia) Evonne Goolagong Cawley	(France) Françoise Dürr	6–0, 6–4
1972	(Australia) Margaret Court	(United Kingdom) Virginia Wade	6–3, 3–6, 7–5
1973	(United Kingdom) Virginia Wade	(United States) Julie Heldman	6–4, 3–6, 6–1
1974	(United Kingdom) Virginia Wade	(United States) Julie Heldman	6–3, 4–6, 6–2

=== Women's doubles ===
Year	Champions	Runners-up	Score
1970	(France) Françoise Durr (United States) Patti Hogan	(Netherlands) Betty Stove (United States) Sharon Walsh	10–8, 3-6, 11–9
1971	(Australia) Evonne Goolagong Cawley (United States) Julie Heldman	(United States) Patti Hogan (United States) Nell Truman	6–3, 6–0
1972	(Australia) Margaret Court (United Kingdom) Virginia Wade	(United States) Julie Heldman (Netherlands) Betty Stöve	6–2, 6–3
1973	(United States) Marita Redondo (United Kingdom) Virginia Wade	(United States) Julie Heldman (United States) Ann Kiyomura	6–1, 2–6, 6–4
1974	(Socialist Federal Republic of Yugoslavia) Mima Jaušovec (Romania) Virginia Ruzici	(Colombia) Isabel Fernández de Soto (Argentina) Raquel Giscafré	6–4, 4–6, 6–4

== Sources ==
- Nieuwland, Alex. "Dewar Cup Second Leg 1972 - Edinburgh". www.tennisarchives.com. Tennis Archives.
- Nieuwland, Alex. "Dewar Cup Second Leg 1973 - Edinburgh". www.tennisarchives.com. Netherlands: Tennis Archives.
- Nieuwland, Alex. "Dewar Cup Second Leg 1974 - Edinburgh". www.tennisarchives.com. Netherlands: Tennis Archives.
- Sony Ericsson WTA Tour: Events 1968-2007" (PDF). web.archive.org. Wayback Machine. 29 May 2008.
