= Dewar Cup Cardiff =

Defunct tennis tournament
- Tour: ILTF Mens Amateur Tour (1913-1967); ILTF Women's Amateur Tour (1913-1967)
- Founded: 1974
- Abolished: 1974
- Location: Cardiff, Wales, Great Britain
- Venue: National Sports Centre
- Surface: Indoor (carpet)

The Dewar Cup Cardiff was an indoor tennis event held only one time from 28 October to 3 November 1974, and played at the National Sports Centre, Cardiff, Wales, as part of the first leg of Dewar Cup Circuit of indoor tournaments held throughout the United Kingdom.

== History ==
The Dewar Cup Cardiff was a one-off event staged on 28 October to 3 November 1974 at the National Sports Center, Cardiff, Wales. It was part of the first leg of the Dewar Cup Circuit that year. The men's singles event was won by Mark Cox. The women's singles event was won by Julie Heldman.

== Finals ==
=== Men's singles ===
Year	Champions	Runners-up	Score
1974	(United Kingdom) Mark Cox	(Croatia) Željko Franulović	6–4, 1–6, 6–0

=== Women's singles ===
Year	Champions	Runners-up	Score
1974	(United States) Julie Heldman	(United Kingdom) Glynis Coles	6–4, 6–2

== Sources ==
- Nieuwland, Alex. "Edition – Dewar Cup First Leg – Cardiff". www.tennisarchives.com. Netherlands: Tennis Archives.
- The Illustrated London News". Illustrated London News & Sketch Limited. 1974.
- Times, The New York (2 November 1974). The New York Times Company, New York, USA.
- Wechsler, Bob (2008). Day by Day in Jewish Sports History. New York: KTAV Publishing House, Inc. ISBN 978-0-88125-969-8.
