= Dewar Cup Billingham =

Defunct tennis tournament
- Event name: Dewar Cup Billigham
- Tour: Open tour (1971); Grand Prix circuit (1972–1973)
- Founded: 1971
- Abolished: 1973
- Editions: 2
- Location: Billingham, England
- Venue: Billingham Forum
- Surface: Carpet / indoor

== Introduction ==
The Dewar Cup was a pioneering indoor tennis circuit that played a pivotal role in the evolution of professional tennis during the late 1960s and 1970s. Sponsored by the Scottish whisky company John Dewar & Sons, the circuit operated from 1968 to 1976, featuring both men's and women's singles and doubles events. Its establishment marked a significant shift towards indoor tennis, providing players with opportunities to compete in controlled environments and influencing the development of the sport.

== Origins and Structure ==
The Dewar Cup circuit was introduced as a series of indoor tournaments held across various locations in the United Kingdom, including Aberavon, Billingham, Cardiff, Edinburgh, London, Nottingham, Perth, Stalybridge, and Torquay. These tournaments were part of the International Lawn Tennis Federation (ILTF) European Circuit from 1968 to 1969 and the Grand Prix circuit from 1970 to 1976. The events were played on carpet courts, a surface that became synonymous with indoor tennis during this era.

Each season of the Dewar Cup consisted of multiple legs, with tournaments held throughout the autumn months, typically from October to November. While each event was a standalone tournament, they collectively formed part of the Dewar Cup circuit, culminating in the Dewar Cup Finals. Initially held at the Crystal Palace in London for the first two years, the finals were moved to the Royal Albert Hall in 1970, where they remained until the circuit's conclusion in 1976.

== Impact on Indoor Tennis ==
Prior to the Dewar Cup, indoor tennis was relatively underdeveloped compared to its outdoor counterpart. The introduction of the Dewar Cup provided a platform for players to compete in indoor conditions, which were faster and more consistent due to the controlled environment. This shift not only influenced playing styles but also contributed to the evolution of tennis equipment, as manufacturers developed gear suited for indoor play.

The circuit's emphasis on indoor tournaments helped popularize the format, leading to the establishment of similar events worldwide. It also paved the way for the inclusion of indoor events in major tournaments, such as the Australian Open, which transitioned to an indoor venue in 1988. The Dewar Cup's legacy is evident in the prominence of indoor tennis in the modern era.

== Finals ==
=== Men's singles ===
| Year | Champions | Runners-up | Score |
|---|---|---|---|
| 1971 | (Chile) Jaime Fillol | (United Kingdom) Gerald Battrick | 2–6, 6–4, 6–3 |
| 1972 | (United Kingdom) John Lloyd | (South Africa) Pat Cramer | 4–6, 6–3, 6–2 |
| 1973 | (United Kingdom) Roger Taylor | (United States) Raz Reid | 6–2, 6–3 |

=== Women's singles ===
| Year | Champions | Runners-up | Score |
|---|---|---|---|
| 1971 | (United Kingdom) Virginia Wade | (United States) Julie Heldman | 4–6, 7–5, 6–3 |
| 1972 | (Australia) Margaret Smith Court | (United States) Julie Heldman | 7–5, 6–0 |
| 1973 | (United Kingdom) Virginia Wade | (France) Nathalie Fuchs | 6–0, 6–2 |

=== Women's doubles ===
| Year | Champions | Runners-up | Score |
|---|---|---|---|
| 1971 | (France) Françoise Dürr (United Kingdom) Virginia Wade | (Australia) Evonne Goolagong (United States) Julie Heldman | 6–3, 4–6, 6–2 |
| 1972 | (Australia) Margaret Smith Court (United Kingdom) Virginia Wade | (United States) Patti Hogan (United States) Sharon Walsh | 6–3, 6–2 |
| 1973 | (United States) Marita Redondo (United Kingdom) Virginia Wade | (United Kingdom) Glynis Coles (United States) Sharon Walsh | 6–7, 6–3, 6–2 |
