= Dewar Cup Stalybridge =

Stalybridge Covered Courts Dewar Cup Stalybridge

Defunct tennis tournament
- Event name: Stalybridge Covered Courts (1965–67); Dewar Cup Stalybridge (1968–70)
- Tour: Amateur, (1965–67); Open, (1968–69); Grand Prix circuit (1970)
- Founded: 1965
- Abolished: 1971
- Editions: 7
- Location: Stalybridge, England
- Venue: Stalybridge Sports Stadium
- Surface: Carpet / indoor

The Dewar Cup Stalybridge and originally called the Stalybridge Covered Courts (1965–1967) was an indoor tennis event held from 1965 through 1970 and played in Stalybridge, England as part of the Dewar Cup circuit of indoor tournaments held throughout the United Kingdom.

== History ==
In December 1965 the first edition of the Stalybridge Covered Courts was inaugurated. This tournament ran under this event name until the Scottish whisky firm John Dewar & Sons sponsored the Dewer Cup Circuit of events beginning in 1968. This tournament was then rebranded as the Dewar Cup Stalybridge until 1971, when Dewar's did not renew their sponsorship and the tournament ended.

== Finals ==
=== Men's singles ===
Year	Champions	Runners-up	Score
Stalybridge Covered Courts
1965	(Australia) Bob Carmichael	(Czechoslovakia) Jan Kukal	6–2, 6–1
1966	(United Kingdom) Roger Taylor	(South Africa) Frew McMillan	6–4, 7–5
1967	(United Kingdom) Roger Taylor	(South Africa) Frew McMillan	6–3, 7–5
Open era
Dewar Cup Stalybridge
1968	(South Africa) Bob Hewitt	(United Kingdom) Gerald Battrick	6–2, 6–3
1969	(United Kingdom) Mark Cox	(South Africa) Bob Hewitt	6–4, 6–3
1970	(Romania) Ion Țiriac	(Australia) John Alexander	6–4, 6–4
1971	(United Kingdom) John de Mendoza	(Czechoslovakia) Jan Kukal	6–4, 6–4

=== Women's singles ===
Year	Champions	Runners-up	Score
Stalybridge Covered Courts
1965	(United Kingdom) Joyce Barclay Williams	(United Kingdom) Robin Blakelock Lloyd	10–8, 6–3
1966	(United Kingdom) Virginia Wade	(United Kingdom) Ann Haydon-Jones	6–2, 6–1
1967	(United Kingdom) Virginia Wade	(United Kingdom) Winnie Shaw	7–5, 6–2
Open era
Dewar Cup Stalybridge
1968	(Australia) Margaret Smith Court	(United Kingdom) Winnie Shaw	7–5, 6–4
1969	(United Kingdom) Virginia Wade	(United Kingdom) Ann Haydon-Jones	6–3, 1–6, 6–3
1970	(United Kingdom) Virginia Wade	(United Kingdom) Ann Haydon-Jones	2–6, 6–2, 6–1

=== Women's doubles ===
Year	Champions	Runners-up	Score'
1968	(United States) Mary-Ann Eisel (United Kingdom) Winnie Shaw	(Australia) Margaret Smith Court (South Africa) Pat Walkden	2–6, 6–4, 6–4
1969	(United Kingdom) Ann Haydon-Jones (United Kingdom) Virginia Wade	(South Africa) Annette Du Plooy (United Kingdom) Joyce Williams	6–3, 6–3
1970	(United Kingdom) Ann Haydon-Jones (United Kingdom) Virginia Wade	(France) Françoise Dürr (United States) Patti Hogan	1–6, 7–6, 7–6

== See also ==
- Stalybridge Open (outdoor clay court tennis tournament)
