= Yuliya Beygelzimer =

Ukrainian tennis player (born 1983)

Yuliya Beygelzimer Юлія Бейгельзимер
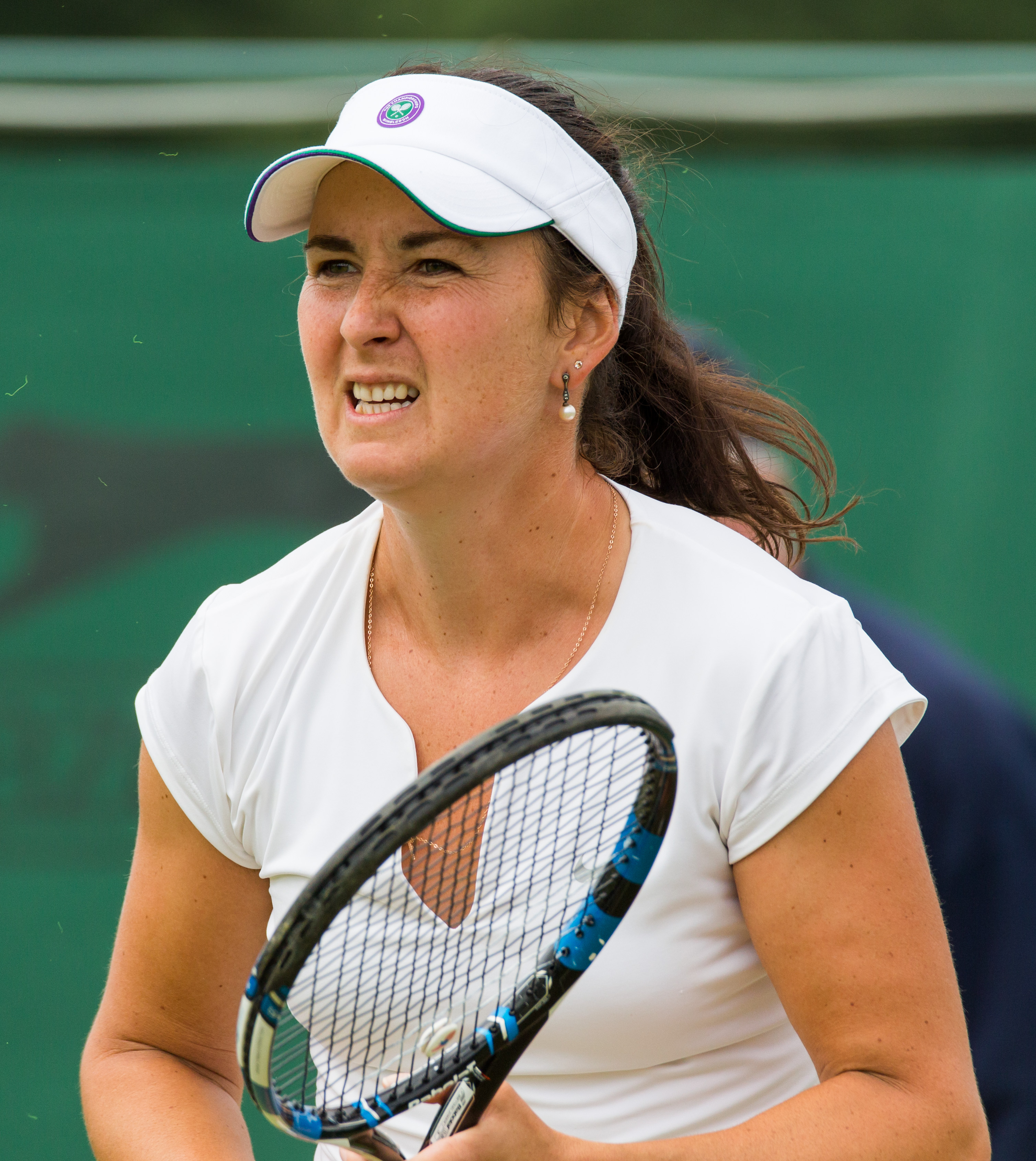
- Beygelzimer at the 2015 Wimbledon qualifying
- Country (sports): Ukraine
- Residence: Donetsk, Ukraine
- Born: 20 October 1983 (age 42) Donetsk, Ukrainian SSR, Soviet Union
- Height: 1.74 m (5 ft 9 in)
- Turned pro: 2001
- Retired: 2016
- Plays: Right-handed (two-handed backhand)
- Prize money: $896,574

Singles
- Career record: 482–371
- Career titles: 12 ITF
- Highest ranking: No. 83 (25 September 2006)

Grand Slam singles results
- Australian Open: 1R (2007)
- French Open: 1R (2004, 2006, 2007, 2013)
- Wimbledon: 1R (2004)
- US Open: 1R (2003, 2006)

Doubles
- Career record: 339–244
- Career titles: 3 WTA, 35 ITF
- Highest ranking: No. 56 (3 April 2006)

Grand Slam doubles results
- Australian Open: 2R (2004, 2005)
- French Open: 1R (2002, 2004, 2005, 2006)
- Wimbledon: 2R (2004, 2005)
- US Open: 2R (2003)

Team competitions
- Fed Cup: 18–13

Yuliya Emanuilivna Beygelzimer (Note: Transliterated as Yulia or Yuliia and Beihelzymer in accordance to the official transliteration) (Ukrainian: Юлія Емануїлівна Бейгелзимер; born 20 October 1983) is a former tennis player from Ukraine.

== Career ==
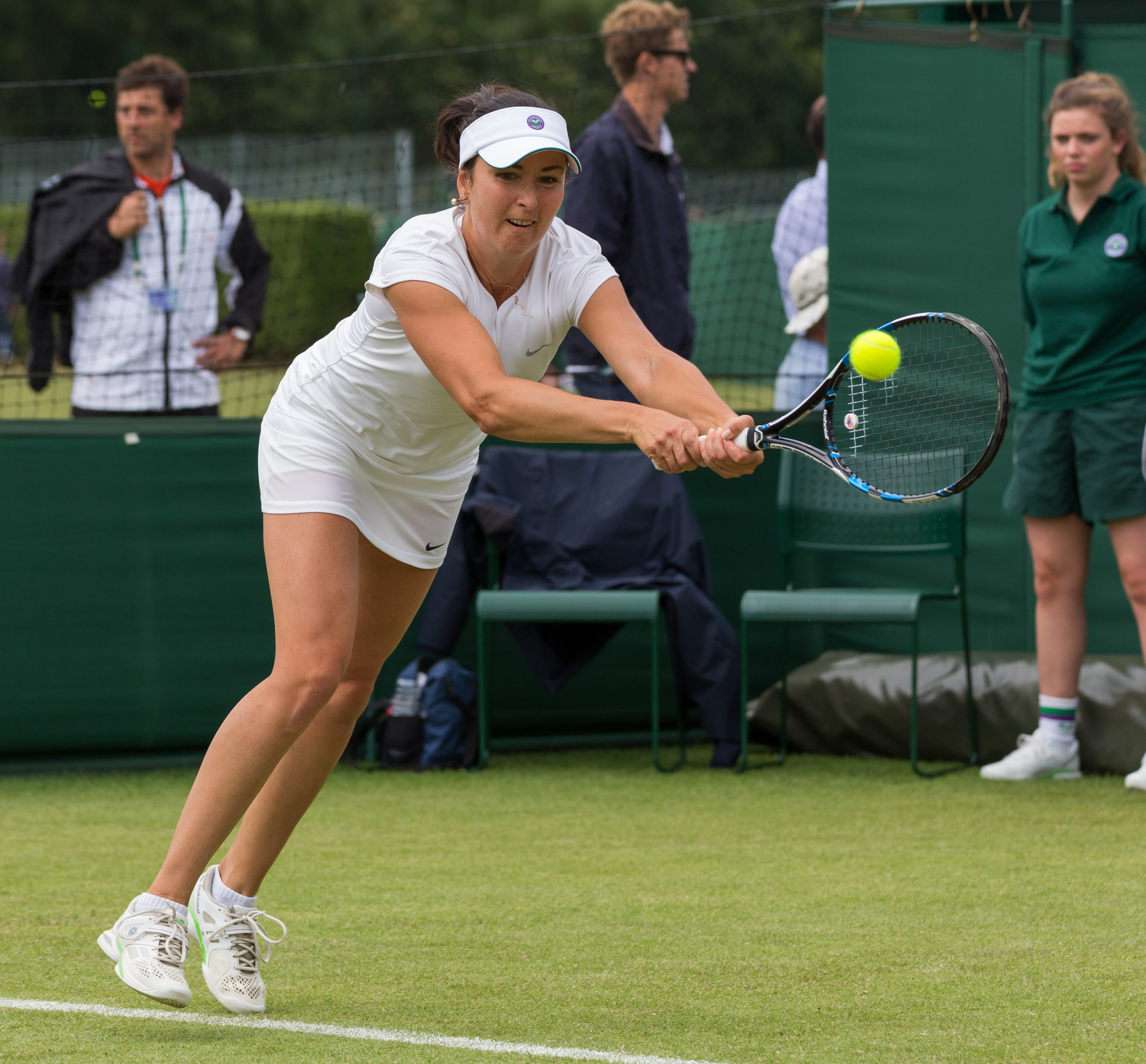
Yuliya at Wimbledon, 2015

She is perhaps best known for nearly defeating Jennifer Capriati at the 2004 French Open where she was down three games to love in the second set but then swept nine of ten games. She lost the match, having led three games to love in the final set after winning the second 6–4.

On 25 September 2006, she reached her best singles ranking of world No. 83. On 3 April 2006, she peaked at No. 56 in the doubles rankings. In her career, she won 12 singles and 35 doubles titles on the ITF Women's Circuit.

She also won three doubles titles on the WTA Tour: at the Tashkent Open in 2003 with Tatiana Poutchek, the 2005 Internazionali di Modena with Mervana Jugić-Salkić, and the 2014 Katowice Open with Olga Savchuk.

She was also runner-up in doubles finals at the Warsaw Open with Anastasia Rodionova 2001, Sunfeast Open with Yuliana Fedak 2006, Pattaya Open with Vitalia Diatchenko 2009, Malaysian Open with Olga Savchuk 2015.

Beygelzimer has competed for Ukraine both at the Olympics and in Fed Cup. Playing for Ukraine Fed Cup team, she has a win–loss record of 18–13.

== Personal life ==
Yuliya Beygelzimer currently resides in her hometown Donetsk. She was coached by her father, Emmanuil. Mother Victoria is engineer. Yuliya was introduced to tennis at the age of seven when father took her to a local club. After her professional years, Yuliya wrote articles for Ukrainian Tennis Magazine.

== WTA Tour finals ==
=== Doubles: 7 (3 titles, 4 runner-ups) ===
Before 2009	Starting in 2009
Grand Slam tournaments
Tier I	Premier M
Tier II	Premier 5
Tier III (0–2)	Premier
Tier IV & V (2–0)	International (1–2)

Result	No.	Date	Tournament	Surface	Partner	Opponents	Score
Loss	1.	Jul 2001	Warsaw Open, Poland	Clay	(Australia) Anastasia Rodionova	(South Africa) Joannette Kruger (Italy) Francesca Schiavone	4–6, 0–6
Win	1.	Oct 2003	Tashkent Open, Uzbekistan	Hard	(Belarus) Tatiana Poutchek	(China) Ting Li (China) Sun Tiantian	6–3, 7–6^{(0)}
Win	2.	Jul 2005	Internazionali di Modena, Italy	Clay	(Bosnia and Herzegovina) Mervana Jugić-Salkić	(Czech Republic) Gabriela Navrátilová (Czech Republic) Michaela Paštiková	6–2, 6–0
Loss	2.	Sep 2006	Sunfeast Open, India	Hard	(Ukraine) Yuliana Fedak	(South Africa) Liezel Huber (India) Sania Mirza	4–6, 0–6
Loss	3.	Feb 2009	Pattaya Open, Thailand	Hard	(Russia) Vitalia Diatchenko	(Thailand) Tamarine Tanasugarn (Kazakhstan) Yaroslava Shvedova	3–6, 2–6
Win	3.	Apr 2014	Katowice Open, Poland	Hard (i)	(Ukraine) Olga Savchuk	(Czech Republic) Klára Koukalová (Romania) Monica Niculescu	6–4, 5–7, [10–7]
Loss	4.	Mar 2015	Malaysian Open	Hard	(Ukraine) Olga Savchuk	(China) Liang Chen (China) Wang Yafan	6–4, 3–6, [4–10]

== ITF Circuit finals ==
=== Singles: 20 (12–8) ===
Legend $75,000 tournaments $50,000 tournaments $25,000 tournaments $10,000 tournaments	Finals by surface Hard (3–4) Clay (7–4) Carpet (2–0)

Result	No.	Date	Tournament	Surface	Opponent	Score
Loss	1.	8 April 2000	ITF Makarska, Croatia	Clay	(Czech Republic) Zuzana Ondrášková	2–6, 3–6
Win	1.	15 July 2001	ITF Sezze, Italy	Clay	(Indonesia) Romana Tedjakusuma	6–2, 6–3
Win	2.	10 February 2002	ITF Lecce, Italy	Clay (i)	(Hungary) Eszter Molnár	6–2, 6–1
Win	3.	31 March 2002	ITF Amiens, France	Clay (i)	(France) Amandine Dulon	7–5, 3–6, 6–3
Win	4.	19 May 2002	ITF Szczecin, Poland	Clay	(Czech Republic) Alena Vašková	2–6, 6–3, 6–3
Loss	2.	4 May 2003	Open de Cagnes-sur-Mer, France	Clay	(France) Stéphanie Cohen-Aloro	4–6, 3–6
Win	5.	22 March 2004	ITF Orange, United States	Hard	(Israel) Evgenia Linetskaya	6–3, 2–6, 6–2
Win	6.	2 October 2005	ITF Biella, Italy	Clay	(Italy) Giulia Gabba	6–2, 6–4
Win	7.	6 November 2005	ITF Minsk, Belarus	Carpet (i)	(Poland) Agnieszka Radwańska	7–6^{(7)}, 6–1
Win	8.	30 July 2006	ITF Pétange, Luxembourg	Clay	(Belgium) Kirsten Flipkens	5–7, 7–6^{(8)}, 6–4
Win	9.	12 November 2006	ITF Opole, Poland	Carpet (i)	(Croatia) Ana Vrljić	6–2, 6–0
Loss	3.	30 June 2007	ITF Périgueux, France	Clay	(Czech Republic) Eva Hrdinová	6–3, 3–6, 4–6
Win	10.	2 October 2010	ITF Helsinki, Finland	Hard (i)	(Finland) Emma Laine	7–6^{(9)}, 6–0
Loss	4.	10 October 2010	Open de Limoges, France	Hard (i)	(Croatia) Ivana Lisjak	0–6, 3–6
Win	11.	19 February 2012	ITF Antalya, Turkey	Clay	(Romania) Liana Ungur	7–5, 7–5
Loss	5.	22 April 2012	ITF Civitavecchia, Italy	Clay	(Spain) María Teresa Torró Flor	6–3, 5–7, 2–6
Loss	6.	15 September 2013	Trabzon Cup, Turkey	Hard	(Germany) Anna-Lena Friedsam	6–4, 3–6, 3–6
Win	12.	27 October 2013	ITF Herzlia, Israel	Hard	(Slovakia) Kristína Kučová	6–3, 4–6, 5–2 ret.
Loss	7.	23 February 2014	ITF New Delhi, India	Hard	(China) Wang Qiang	1–6, 3–6
Loss	8.	27 April 2014	Lale Cup Istanbul, Turkey	Hard	(Czech Republic) Denisa Allertová	2–6, 3–6

=== Doubles: 58 (35–23) ===
Legend $100,000 tournaments $75,000 tournaments $50,000 tournaments $25,000 tournaments $10,000 tournaments	Finals by surface Hard (12–8) Clay (20–15) Carpet (3–0)

Result	No.	Date	Tournament	Surface	Partner	Opponents	Score
Win	1.	25 March 2001	ITF Cholet, France	Clay (i)	(Australia) Anastasia Rodionova	(Greece) Eleni Daniilidou (Italy) Germana di Natale	6–1, 7–6^{(7)}
Loss	1.	15 April 2001	ITF Quartu Sant'Elena, Italy	Clay	(Belarus) Evgenia Subbotina	(Czech Republic) Pavlina Slitrová (Czech Republic) Renata Voráčová	3–6, 4–6
Loss	2.	3 June 2001	ITF Warsaw, Poland	Clay	(Armenia) Liudmila Nikoyan	(Slovakia) Martina Babáková (Czech Republic) Lenka Snajdrová	4–6, 4–6
Loss	3.	27 January 2002	ITF Courmayeur, Italy	Hard (i)	(Netherlands) Jolanda Mens	(Russia) Goulnara Fattakhetdinova (Russia) Maria Kondratieva	7–5, 3–6, 4–6
Win	2.	3 February 2002	ITF Ortisei, Italy	Carpet (i)	(Australia) Anastasia Rodionova	(Germany) Angelika Bachmann (Austria) Patricia Wartusch	6–4, 6–2
Win	3.	10 February 2002	ITF Lecce, Italy	Clay (i)	(Hungary) Eszter Molnár	(Czech Republic) Eva Erbová (Slovenia) Tina Hergold	7–6^{(7)}, 6–4
Win	4.	30 March 2002	ITF Amiens, France	Clay (i)	(Russia) Marianna Yuferova	(Argentina) Natalia Gussoni (Netherlands) Tessy van de Ven	6–2, 5–7, 6–2
Loss	4.	13 April 2002	ITF Dinan, France	Clay (i)	(Belgium) Patty Van Acker	(France) Caroline Dhenin (France) Émilie Loit	3–6, 1–6
Loss	5.	8 September 2002	Open Denain, France	Clay	(Luxembourg) Claudine Schaul	(Czech Republic) Olga Vymetálková (Czech Republic) Gabriela Chmelinová	3–6, 0–6
Loss	6.	20 April 2003	Open de Biarritz, France	Clay	(Ukraine) Anna Zaporozhanova	(United Kingdom) Lucie Ahl (Tunisia) Selima Sfar	1–6, 1–6
Loss	7.	3 May 2003	Open de Cagnes-sur-Mer, France	Clay	(Ukraine) Anna Zaporozhanova	(Russia) Vera Dushevina (Kazakhstan) Galina Voskoboeva	3–6, 4–6
Win	5.	13 July 2003	ITF Vittel, France	Clay	(Belarus) Tatiana Poutchek	(Czech Republic) Eva Birnerová (Czech Republic) Libuše Průšová	6–3, 6–2
Win	6.	18 August 2003	Bronx Open, US	Hard	(Belarus) Tatiana Poutchek	(Italy) Mara Santangelo (Tunisia) Selima Sfar	6–4, 7–5
Loss	8.	14 September 2003	Open Denain, France	Clay	(Belarus) Tatiana Poutchek	(Italy) Mara Santangelo (Italy) Antonella Serra Zanetti	5–7, 3–6
Loss	9.	2 November 2003	ITF Poitiers, France	Hard (i)	(Belarus) Tatiana Poutchek	(France) Caroline Dhenin (Germany) Bianka Lamade	5–7, 2–6
Win	7.	3 October 2004	ITF Porto, Portugal	Clay	(Netherlands) Anousjka van Exel	(Italy) Sara Errani (Portugal) Joana Pangaio Pereira	7–5, 6–0
Win	8.	13 February 2005	Midland Tennis Classic, US	Hard (i)	(United States) Kelly McCain	(Russia) Anna Bastrikova (France) Iryna Brémond	6–2, 6–4
Win	9.	27 February 2005	ITF Saint Paul, US	Hard (i)	(Germany) Sandra Klösel	(Canada) Mélanie Marois (United States) Sarah Riske	6–2, 6–1
Win	10.	27 March 2005	ITF Redding, US	Hard	(Canada) Stéphanie Dubois	(New Zealand) Leanne Baker (Italy) Francesca Lubiani	6–4, 6–7^{(1)}, 6–3
Loss	10.	10 April 2005	ITF Dinan, France	Clay (i)	(Germany) Sandra Klösel	(Netherlands) Michaëlla Krajicek (Hungary) Ágnes Szávay	5–7, 5–7
Win	11.	30 April 2005	Open de Cagnes-sur-Mer, France	Clay	(Germany) Sandra Klösel	(France) Caroline Dhenin (Romania) Andreea Ehritt-Vanc	6–3, 3–6, 6–1
Win	12.	5 June 2005	ITF Prostějov, Czech Republic	Clay	(Italy) Mara Santangelo	(Czech Republic) Dája Bedáňová (Czech Republic) Barbora Záhlavová-Strýcová	6–1, 4–6, 6–2
Win	13.	3 July 2005	ITF Stuttgart-Vaihingen, Germany	Clay	(Germany) Vanessa Henke	(Germany) Kristina Barrois (Germany) Kathrin Wörle-Scheller	7–6^{(7)}, 6–1
Win	14.	23 July 2005	ITF Pétange, Luxembourg	Clay	(Germany) Sandra Klösel	(United Kingdom) Claire Curran (Netherlands) Kim Kilsdonk	6–4, 6–0
Win	15.	18 March 2006	ITF Fuerteventura, Spain	Hard	(Germany) Angelika Rösch	(Germany) Angelika Bachmann (Germany) Kristina Barrois	6–3, 6–7^{(5)}, 6–4
Loss	11.	25 March 2006	ITF St. Petersburg, Russia	Hard (i)	(Russia) Alla Kudryavtseva	(Russia) Anastasia Pavlyuchenkova (Russia) Yulia Solonitskaya	1–6, 4–6
Win	16.	22 July 2006	ITF Vittel, France	Clay	(Hungary) Ágnes Szávay	(Romania) Mădălina Gojnea (Russia) Ekaterina Makarova	6–2, 7–5
Win	17.	18 November 2006	ITF Deauville, France	Clay (i)	(Ukraine) Yuliana Fedak	(Italy) Silvia Disderi (Israel) Tzipora Obziler	7–5, 6–4
Win	18.	26 November 2006	ITF Poitiers, France	Hard (i)	(Ukraine) Yuliana Fedak	(Belarus) Darya Kustova (Belarus) Tatiana Poutchek	7–5, 6–3
Loss	12.	29 June 2007	ITF Périgueux, France	Clay	(Ukraine) Yevgenia Savranska	(Czech Republic) Eva Hrdinová (Canada) Marie-Ève Pelletier	6–3, 5–7, 1–6
Loss	13.	7 July 2007	ITF Cuneo, Italy	Clay	(Georgia (country)) Margalita Chakhnashvili	(Belarus) Darya Kustova (Russia) Ekaterina Makarova	2–6, 6–2, 2–6
Win	19.	9 March 2008	ITF Minsk, Belarus	Carpet (i)	(Russia) Anna Lapushchenkova	(Belarus) Ima Bohush (Belarus) Ksenia Milevskaya	6–4, 7–5
Win	20.	29 March 2008	ITF La Palma, Spain	Hard	(Switzerland) Stefanie Vögele	(Spain) Estrella Cabeza Candela (Spain) Sílvia Soler Espinosa	7–5, 7–6^{(7)}
Win	21.	6 April 2008	ITF Hamburg, Germany	Carpet (i)	(Switzerland) Stefanie Vögele	(Czech Republic) Veronika Chvojková (Czech Republic) Andrea Hlaváčková	7–6^{(7)}, 6–2
Loss	14.	13 July 2008	Zagreb Ladies Open, Croatia	Clay	(Switzerland) Stefanie Vögele	(Estonia) Maret Ani (Croatia) Jelena Kostanić Tošić	4–6, 2–6
Loss	15.	21 September 2008	ITF Madrid, Spain	Hard	(Russia) Anastasia Poltoratskaya	(France) Julie Coin (France) Irena Pavlovic	3–6, 4–6
Win	22.	21 June 2009	Open de Montpellier, France	Clay	(Germany) Laura Siegemund	(Switzerland) Stefania Boffa (United States) Story Tweedie-Yates	6–4, 6–1
Win	23.	27 June 2009	ITF Périgueux, France	Clay	(Russia) Ksenia Lykina	(Argentina) Jorgelina Cravero (Argentina) María Irigoyen	2–6, 6–2, [10–5]
Win	24.	5 July 2009	Bella Cup, Poland	Clay	(Belarus) Ksenia Milevskaya	(Poland) Karolina Kosińska (Poland) Aleksandra Rosolska	6–1, 6–4
Loss	16.	10 January 2010	Blossom Cup, China	Hard	(China) Yan Zi	(China) Liu Wanting (China) Zhou Yimiao	1–6, 2–6
Win	25.	28 March 2010	ITF Antalya, Turkey	Clay	(Greece) Anna Gerasimou	(Romania) Mihaela Buzărnescu (Australia) Alenka Hubacek	w/o
Loss	17.	30 July 2010	ITF Almaty, Kazakhstan	Hard	(United Kingdom) Emily Webley-Smith	(Uzbekistan) Albina Khabibulina (Kyrgyzstan) Ksenia Palkina	4–6, 4–6
Loss	18.	1 October 2010	ITF Helsinki, Finland	Hard (i)	(France) Kristina Mladenovic	(Netherlands) Kiki Bertens (Netherlands) Richèl Hogenkamp	3–6, 5–7
Loss	19.	9 January 2011	Blossom Cup, China	Hard	(Georgia (country)) Oksana Kalashnikova	(China) Liu Wanting (China) Sun Shengnan	3–6, 2–6
Win	26.	12 June 2011	ITF Zlín, Czech Republic	Clay	(Georgia (country)) Margalita Chakhnashvili	(Hungary) Réka Luca Jani (Hungary) Katalin Marosi	3–6, 6–1, [10–8]
Loss	20.	31 July 2011	ITS Cup, Czech Republic	Clay	(Romania) Elena Bogdan	(Netherlands) Michaëlla Krajicek (Czech Republic) Renata Voráčová	5–7, 4–6
Win	27.	26 February 2012	ITF Antalya, Turkey	Clay	(Belarus) Ksenia Milevskaya	(Chinese Taipei) Lee Hua-chen (Chinese Taipei) Lee Pei-chi	6–3, 7–6^{(7)}
Win	28.	22 July 2012	Contrexéville Open, France	Clay	(Czech Republic) Renata Voráčová	(Croatia) Tereza Mrdeža (Croatia) Silvia Njirić	6–1, 6–1
Loss	21.	29 July 2012	ITS Cup, Czech Republic	Clay	(Czech Republic) Renata Voráčová	(Spain) Inés Ferrer Suárez (Netherlands) Richèl Hogenkamp	2–6, 6–7^{(7)}
Loss	22.	7 July 2013	Bella Cup, Poland	Clay	(Romania) Elena Bogdan	(Poland) Paula Kania (Poland) Magda Linette	2–6, 6–4, [5–10]
Win	29.	13 July 2013	Open de Biarritz, France	Clay	(Ukraine) Olga Savchuk	(Russia) Vera Dushevina (Croatia) Ana Vrljić	2–6, 6–4, [10–8]
Win	30.	3 August 2013	ITF Donetsk, Ukraine	Hard	(Czech Republic) Renata Voráčová	(Serbia) Vesna Dolonc (Russia) Alexandra Panova	6–1, 6–4
Win	31.	7 September 2013	Trabzon Cup, Turkey	Hard	(Ukraine) Maryna Zanevska	(Ukraine) Alona Fomina (Germany) Christina Shakovets	6–3, 6–1
Win	32.	26 October 2013	ITF Herzlia, Israel	Hard	(Ukraine) Anastasiya Vasylyeva	(Turkey) Başak Eraydın (Turkey) Melis Sezer	6–3, 6–3
Win	33.	20 December 2013	Ankara Cup, Turkey	Hard	(Turkey) Çağla Büyükakçay	(Greece) Eleni Daniilidou (Serbia) Aleksandra Krunić	6–3, 6–3
Win	34.	25 January 2014	Open Andrézieux-Bouthéon, France	Hard (i)	(Ukraine) Kateryna Kozlova	(Switzerland) Timea Bacsinszky (Germany) Kristina Barrois	6–3, 3–6, [10–8]
Loss	23.	8 June 2014	Open de Marseille, France	Clay	(Ukraine) Olga Savchuk	(Spain) Lourdes Domínguez Lino (Spain) Beatriz García Vidagany	1–6, 2–6
Win	35.	9 May 2015	Empire Slovak Open	Clay	(Russia) Margarita Gasparyan	(Serbia) Aleksandra Krunić (Croatia) Petra Martić	6–3, 6–2

== Grand Slam singles performance timeline ==
Key
W	F	SF	QF	#R	RR	Q#	DNQ	A	NH

(W) winner; (F) finalist; (SF) semifinalist; (QF) quarterfinalist; (#R) rounds 4, 3, 2, 1; (RR) round-robin stage; (Q#) qualification round; (DNQ) did not qualify; (A) absent; (NH) not held; (SR) strike rate (events won / competed); (W–L) win–loss record.

Tournament	2002	2003	2004	2005	2006	2007	2008	2009	2010	2011	2012	2013	2014	2015	2016	W–L
Australian Open	A	Q2	Q2	Q2	Q1	1R	Q2	A	A	Q2	Q1	Q2	Q1	Q2	A	0–1
French Open	A	Q3	1R	Q2	1R	1R	A	A	A	Q2	Q2	1R	1R	Q1	Q1	0–5
Wimbledon	A	Q2	1R	Q1	Q2	Q1	A	A	A	Q1	Q2	A	Q2	Q1	A	0–1
US Open	Q2	1R	Q2	Q1	1R	Q2	A	Q1	A	Q2	Q1	Q1	Q1	A	Q1	0–2
