= 1970 ILTF Women's Tennis Circuit =

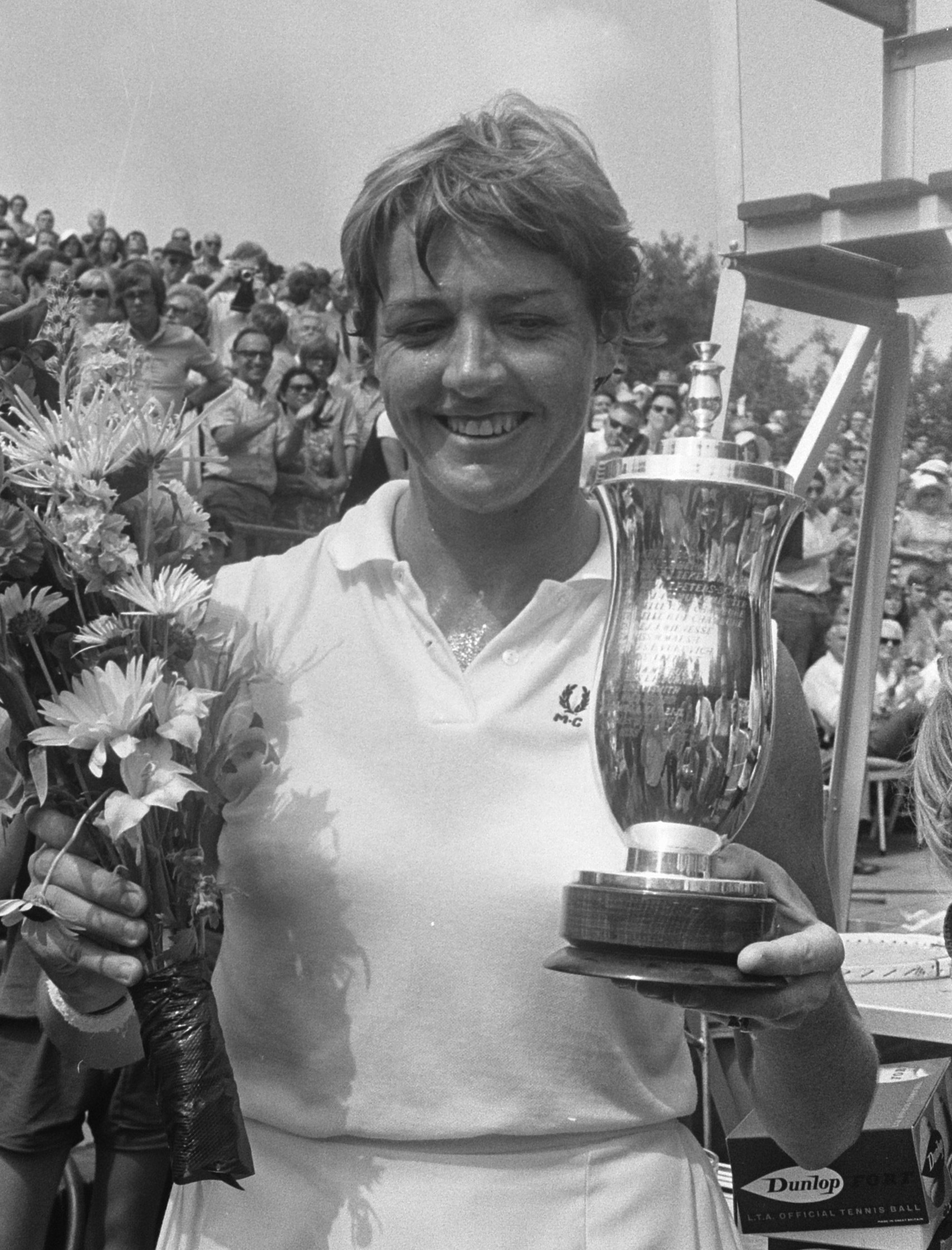
- Margaret Court in August 1970 won 21 tour titles this year.

Details
- Duration: 27 December 1969 – 26 December 1970
- Edition: 57th (ILTF)
- Tournaments: 314
- Categories: Grand Slam (4); African Circuit (13); Asian Circuit (16); Central America & Caribbean Circuit (6); European Circuit (141); North American Circuit (86 ) Oceania Circuit (29); South American Circuit (6); Virginia Slims (2); Team (6)

Achievements (singles)
- Most titles: (Australia) Margaret Court (21)
- Most finals: (Australia) Margaret Court (27)

Eastboru

The 1970 ILTF Women's Tennis Circuit was the 57th season since the formation of the International Lawn Tennis Federation in 1913, and the 96th season since the first women's tournaments were held in 1876.

Also known as the World Tennis Circuit or simply the ILTF Circuit consisted of a worldwide series of 314 tennis tournaments played across 6 continental tennis circuits and administered by the ILTF and its associate members.

The circuit began in late December 1969 in Valencia, Spain and ended on 26 December 1970 in East London, South Africa.

1970 was a very important year for women's tennis that would see the staging of two women only Virginia Slims events leading to a nascent Virginia Slims Circuit. The Virginia Slims Circuit would then be the platform for the formation of the Women's Tennis Association, which has risen to the structures of today.

== Summary of season ==
The Open era began with the British Hard Court Championships in Bournemouth in 1968. At the first Open Wimbledon, the prize-fund difference was 2.5:1 in favour of men. Billie Jean King won £750 for taking the title, while Rod Laver took £2,000. The total purses of the competitions were £14,800 for men and £5,680 for women. By the 1970s, the pay difference which had been a 2.5:1 ratio between men and women had increased. In 1969, ratios of 5:1 in terms of pay were common at smaller tournaments; by 1970, these figures increased to 8:1 and even 12:1.

The situation came to a head in 1970, when most tournaments offered four times as much prize money to men than they did to women. At the 1970 Italian Open, men's singles champion Ilie Năstase was paid US$3,500 while women's singles champion King received just US$600. On top of this, the USLTA failed to organise any tournaments for women in 1970.

Billie Jean King and eight other female tennis players – Americans Rosemary Casals, Nancy Richey, Peaches Bartkowicz, Kristy Pigeon, Valerie Ziegenfuss, Julie Heldman and Australians Kerry Melville Reid and Judy Tegart Dalton decided to enlist World Tennis magazine publisher Gladys Heldman to help negotiate for greater equality in prize money and provide valuable public relations assistance. All the players were putting their tennis careers at risk because the influential USLTA did not back them.

Gladys Heldman and the "Original 9" decided to target the Pacific Southwest Championships held in Los Angeles on the grounds that it paid eight times more money to men than it did to women. Heldman attempted to get the tournament chairman, former professional tennis player Jack Kramer, to reduce the inequality between the prize money purses for men and women. Kramer refused, leading the "Original 9" to declare at a press conference held at Forest Hills, New York that they would boycott the Pacific Southwest Championships and play at what would become the first Virginia Slims Circuit event, a US$7,500 Houston Women's Invitation tournament held in Houston, Texas in September 1970 Despite the USLTA's declaration that it would not sanction this event, the "Original 9" went ahead. The Virginia Slims Circuit provided the platform for the formation of the Women's Tennis Association, which has risen to the structures of today.

The 1970 ILTF women's tennis circuit began with Coupe Faucombridge tournament in Valencia, Spain. In the four most important tournaments of the year defending champion Margaret Court defeated Kerry Melville in the final, 6–3, 6–1 to win the women's singles tennis title at the Australian Open. It was her ninth Australian title. At the French Open defending champion Margaret Court defeated Helga Niessen in the final, 6–2, 6–4 to win the women's singles tennis title. It was her fourth French Open singles title.

At the Wimbledon Championships Margaret Court defeated Billie Jean King in the final, 14–12, 11–9 to win the ladies' singles tennis title, her third major singles title of the year, and her 19th major singles title overall. At the US Open defending champion Margaret Court defeated Rosie Casals in the final, 6–2, 2–6, 6–1 to win the women's singles tennis title at the 1970 US Open. With the win, Court completed the Grand Slam, becoming the second woman to achieve it after Maureen Connolly in (1953), and the first woman in the Open Era to do so. It was her record-breaking 20th major singles title, surpassing Helen Wills Moody's all-time tally. The circuit ended on 26 December 1970 at the Border Championships in East London, South Africa.

== Schedule ==
This is a calendar of all official events that were administered by the International Lawn Tennis Federation in the year 1970, with player progression documented from the quarterfinals stage. The table also includes Grand Slam events, and tournaments on the African, Asian, Australasia, Central American & Caribbean, European, and South American ILTF regional circuits, as part of the annual world tennis circuit. Team events such as the Federation Cup and Wightman Cup are included.

Key

Grand Slam events
African Circuit.
Asian Circuit.
Australasia Circuit.
Central American/Caribbean Circuit.
European Circuit.
North American Circuit.
South American Circuit.
Virginia Slims Series
Team & Games events

=== January ===
Ended	Tournament	Winner	Finalist	Semi finalist	Quarter finalist
1 Jan.	Copa Faulcombridge; Valencia, Spain; Clay; Singles - Doubles	(Spain) Carmen Mandarino; 4–6, 6–3, 6–4	(West Germany) Ilse Buding	(Spain) Elisa Gisbert (United States) Stephanie Wowes	
1 Jan.	South Australian Championships; Adelaide, Australia; Grass; Singles - Doubles	(Australia) Lesley Hunt (United Kingdom) Winnie Shaw	final cancelled rain stopped play	(Australia) Karen Krantzcke (Australia) Kerry Melville	(Australia) Kerry Harris (Australia) Helen Kayser (Sweden) Christina Sandberg (Australia) Janet Young
1 Jan.	Northern India and Punjab State Championships; Amritsar, India; Clay; Singles - Doubles	(Soviet Union) Aleksandra Ivanova; 6–1, 6–3	(Socialist Federal Republic of Yugoslavia) Irena Škulj	(India) Nirupama Mankad (United States) Alice Tym	(Romania) Judith Dibar (Soviet Union) Tiiu Kivi (India) Kiran Peshawaria (India) Nirupama Vasant
1 Jan.	South Island Championships; Nelson, New Zealand; Grass; Singles - Doubles	(United States) Alice Tym; 4–6, 6–2, 6–1	(New Zealand) Beverley Vercoe	(New Zealand) Shirley Collins (New Zealand) Marilyn Pryde	(Canada) Stephanie Bardsley (New Zealand) Sonia Cox (New Zealand) Marion Law (United Kingdom) Winnie Shaw
3 Jan.	Eastern Province Championships; Port Elizabeth, South Africa; Hard; Singles - Doubles	(Rhodesia) Pat Walkden; 6–4, 6–2	(United Kingdom) Ann Haydon Jones	(South Africa) Marianna Brummer (Australia) Helen Gourlay	(South Africa) Greta Delport (South Africa) Brenda Kirk (United Kingdom) Corinne Molesworth (United States) Kristy Pigeon
3 Jan.	Asian International Championships; New Delhi, India; Clay; Singles - Doubles	(Soviet Union) Rena Azbandaze; 9–7, 6–3	(Soviet Union) Aleksandra Ivanova	(India) Nirupama Vasant (Socialist Federal Republic of Yugoslavia) Irena Škulj	
4 Jan.	Western Australian Championships; Perth, Australia; Grass; Singles - Doubles	(Australia) Margaret Court; 6–4, 6–4	(Australia) Kerry Melville	(Sweden) Christina Sandberg (United Kingdom) Winnie Shaw	(Australia) Ann Coleman (Australia) Lesley Hunt (Australia) Brenda Jenkins (Australia) Karen Krantzcke
4 Jan.	North Island Championships; Hutt Valley, New Zealand; Grass; Singles - Doubles	(United States) Alice Tym; 6–3, 6–2	(New Zealand) Beverley Vercoe	(New Zealand) J. Bloxham (New Zealand) Robyn Legge	(New Zealand) Christine Bray (New Zealand) Shirley Collins (New Zealand) Cecilie Fleming (New Zealand) Mrs. B. Ward
5 Jan.	Manly Seaside Championships; Sydney, Australia; Grass; Singles - Doubles	(Australia) Evonne Goolagong; 6–2, 4–6, 6–2	(Australia) Wendy Gilchrist	(Australia) Judy Tegart-Dalton (Australia) Jan Lehane O'Neill	(Australia) Elizabeth Craig (Australia) Pat Edwards (Australia) L Kelisee (Indonesia) Lita Liem
10 Jan.	Tasmanian Open Championships; Hobart, Australia; Grass; Singles - Doubles	(Australia) Margaret Court; 6–2, 6–2	(Australia) Kerry Melville	(Australia) Judy Tegart-Dalton (Australia) Karen Krantzcke	(Australia) Wendy Gilchrist (Australia) Lesley Hunt (United Kingdom) Winnie Shaw (Sweden) Christina Sandberg
10 Jan.	Orange Free State Championships; Bloemfontein, South Africa; Hard; Singles - Doubles	(United Kingdom) Ann Haydon Jones; 6–4, 8–6	(United States) Peaches Bartkowicz	(Australia) Helen Gourlay (Rhodesia) Pat Walkden	(South Africa) Denise Carter (South Africa) Brenda Kirk (United States) Kristy Pigeon (United States) Valerie Ziegenfuss
11 Jan.	New Zealand Championships; Wellington, New Zealand; Grass; Singles - Doubles	(New Zealand) Marilyn Pryde; 8–6, 6–1	(New Zealand) Robyn Legge	(United States) Alice Tym (New Zealand) Beverley Vercoe	(Canada) Stephanie Bardsley (New Zealand) Jill Bloxham (New Zealand) Shirley Collins (New Zealand) Cecilie Fleming
11 Jan.	Moscow Open; Moscow, Soviet Union; Carpet (i); Singles - Doubles	(Soviet Union) Olga Morozova; 6–3, 6–2	(Soviet Union) Marina Chuvirina	(Soviet Union) Anna Islanova (Soviet Union) Ludmila Izopaitus	(Soviet Union) Maria Kully (Soviet Union) Irina Samuelova (Soviet Union) Zaiga Yansone (Soviet Union) Anna Yeremeyeva
11 Jan.	All-India Hard Court Championships; Amaravati, India; Clay; Singles - Doubles	(Soviet Union) Nina Turkherelli; 6–4, 6–4	(Socialist Federal Republic of Yugoslavia) Irena Škulj	(Romania) Judith Dibar (India) Nirupama Vasant	(India) Nirupama Mankad (India) Kiran Peshawaria (United States) Carol-Ann Prosen (India) Rattan Thadani
11 Jan.	South Florida Championships; West Palm Beach, United States; Clay; Singles - Doubles	(United States) Chris Evert; 6–3, 6–2	(United States) Stephanie Johnson	(United States) Laurie Fleming (Netherlands) Astrid Suurbeek	(United States) Bunny Austib (United States) Martha Cochrane (United States) Sally Slater (Uruguay) Silvia Urroz
17 Jan.	Western Province Championships; Cape Town, South Africa; Hard; Singles - Doubles	(United Kingdom) Ann Haydon Jones; 6–1, 6–2	(United States) Peaches Bartkowicz	(Australia) Helen Gourlay (Rhodesia) Pat Walkden	(United States) Denise Carter (United Kingdom) Corinne Molesworth (United States) Kristy Pigeon (United States) Valerie Ziegenfuss
18 Jan.	Auckland Championships; Hutt Valley, New Zealand; Grass; Singles - Doubles	(United States) Alice Tym; 6–3, 7–9, 6–1	(New Zealand) Robyn Legge	(New Zealand) Shirley Collins (New Zealand) Cecilie Fleming	(Canada) Stephanie Bardsley (New Zealand) Sue Blakely (New Zealand) Jill Bloxham (New Zealand) Beverley Vercoe
18 Jan.	Indian International Championships; Calcutta, India; Clay; Singles - Doubles	(Soviet Union) Anna Ivanova; 6–4, 6–4	(Soviet Union) Nina Turkherelli	(United States) Carol-Ann Prosen (Soviet Union) Olga Morozova	(Romania) Judith Dibar (India) Nirupama Mankad (India) Rattan Thadani (India) Nirupama Vasant
18 Jan.	Tamil Union Championships; Colombo, Sri Lanka; Clay; Singles - Doubles	(Dominion of Ceylon) Srima Abeyegunawardene; 6–1, 4–6, retd.	(Dominion of Ceylon) Susima Abeyegunawardene	(Dominion of Ceylon) Oosha Chanmugam (Dominion of Ceylon) Mala Fernando	(Dominion of Ceylon) Sria Gooneratne (Dominion of Ceylon) Ranjani Jayasuriya (Dominion of Ceylon) Wendy Molligoda (Indonesia) Lita Liem
18 Jan.	Florida State Open Championships; Orlando, United States; Clay; Singles - Doubles	(United States) Stephanie Johnson; 6–2, 6–1	(United States) Mona Schallau		
25 Jan.	West German Indoor Championships; Munich, West Germany; Wood (i); Singles - Doubles	(United Kingdom) Virginia Wade; 6–2, 6–4	(United Kingdom) Joyce Williams	(Sweden) Eva Lundqvist (Czechoslovakia) Vlasta Vopičková	(Norway) Ellen Grindvold (Finland) Birgitta Lindstrom (West Germany) Helga Niessen (Czechoslovakia) Alena Palmeová
25 Jan.	Fort Lauderdale Invitational; Fort Lauderdale, United States; Clay; Singles - Doubles	(United States) Chris Evert; 6–1, 6–0	(United States) Laurie Fleming	(United States) Patti Ann Reese (United States) Stephanie Johnson	(United States) Sherry Beddingfield (United States) Lynne Epstein (United States) Carol Gfroerer (United States) Kathy Thornbrough
25 Jan.	Manila Metropolitan Championships; Manila, Philippines; Clay; Singles - Doubles	(United States) Ceci Martinez; 6–1, 6–0	(Philippines) Pay Yngayo	(Philippines) Marissa Sanchez (Indonesia) Yolanda Soemarno	
25 Jan.	Seabrook Fowlds North Shore Championships; Forrest Hill, New Zealand; Grass; Singles - Doubles	(United States) Alice Tym; 4–6, 6–4, 7–5	(New Zealand) Robyn Legge	(New Zealand) Beverley Vercoe (New Zealand) Beverley Ward	(Canada) Stephanie Bardsley (New Zealand) Christine Bray (New Zealand) Shirley Collins (New Zealand) Elaine Stephan
27 Jan.	Australian Open; Sydney, Australia; Grass; Singles - Doubles	(Australia) Margaret Court; 6–3, 6–1	(Australia) Kerry Melville	(Australia) Karen Krantzcke (United Kingdom) Winnie Shaw	(Australia) Judy Dalton (Australia) Evonne Goolagong (Australia) Lesley Hunt (Sweden) Christina Sandberg
27 Jan.	Australian Open; Sydney, Australia; Grass; Singles - Doubles	(Australia) Margaret Court (Australia) Judy Dalton; 6–1, 6–3	(Australia) Karen Krantzcke (Australia) Kerry Melville	(Australia) Karen Krantzcke (United Kingdom) Winnie Shaw	(Australia) Judy Dalton (Australia) Evonne Goolagong (Australia) Lesley Hunt (Sweden) Christina Sandberg
30 Jan.	Scandinavian Indoor Championships; Oslo, Norway; Carpet (i); Singles - Doubles	(United Kingdom) Joyce Williams; 6–2, 6–1	(United Kingdom) Nell Truman	(Sweden) Eva Lundqvist (Sweden) Margareta Strandberg	(Sweden) Kirsten Anden (Sweden) Ingrid Löfdahl Bentzer (Sweden) Isabelle Larsson (Finland) Birgitta Lindström

=== February ===
Ended	Tournament	Winner	Finalist	Semi finalist	Quarter finalist
1 Feb.	Benson & Hedges New Zealand Open; Auckland, New Zealand; Grass; Singles - Doubles	(United Kingdom) Ann Haydon Jones; 0–6, 6–4, 6–1	(United States) Rosie Casals	(Australia) Margaret Court (Australia) Karen Krantzcke	(New Zealand) Robyn Legge (Sweden) Christina Sandberg (United Kingdom) Winnie Shaw (United States) Alice Tym
1 Feb.	March of Dimes Open; San Diego, United States; Hard; Singles - Doubles	(United States) Nancy Ornstein; 3–6, 6–4, 7–5	(United States) Janet Newberry	(United States) Marita Redondo (United States) Mary Struthers	(United States) Denise Bradshaw (United States) Kris Kemmer (United States) Susan Riebel (United States) Ruan Smith
1 Feb.	Los Angeles Metropolitan Championships; Los Angeles, United States; Hard; Singles - Doubles	(United States) Pam Teeguarden; 6–0, 6–1	(United States) Winnie McCoy	(United States) Anita Platte (United States) Vicki Smouse	(United States) Stephanie Grant (United States) Doreen Irish (United States) Marilyn Straw (United States) Tina Watanabe
1 Feb.	Marrickville and Districts Hardcourts; Marrickville, Australia; Clay; Singles - Doubles	(Australia) Helen Sheedy; 10–8, 1–0 retd.	(Australia) Margaret Hellyer	(Australia) Gai Healey (Australia) Helen Kayser	
8 Feb	ITPA Open Indoor; Philadelphia, United States; Hard (i); Singles - Doubles	(Australia) Margaret Court; 6–3, 7–6 (14-12)	(United States) Billie Jean King	(United States) Julie Heldman (United States) Nancy Richey	(United States) Peaches Bartkowicz (United States) Rosie Casals (France) Francoise Durr (United Kingdom) Virginia Wade
8 Feb	USSR All-Union Championships; Kiev, Soviet Union; Hard (i); Singles - Doubles	(Soviet Union) Olga Morozova; 6–4, 6–3	(Soviet Union) Anna Yeremeyeva	(Soviet Union) Marina Chuvyrina (Soviet Union) Maria Kull	(Soviet Union) Yelena Granaturovna (Soviet Union) Tiiu Parmas (Soviet Union) Valentina Petrova (Soviet Union) Zaiga Yansone
12 Feb.	Vanderbilt Indoor Open (also called Ladies World Invitational); New York City, United States; Hard; Singles - Doubles	(Australia) Margaret Court; 6–3, 6–3	(United Kingdom) Virginia Wade	(United States) Rosie Casals (United Kingdom) Ann Haydon Jones	(United States) Peaches Bartkowicz (France) Francoise Durr (United States) Billie Jean King (United States) Val Ziegenfussbe
15 Feb.	Maureen Connolly Brinker Memorial; Dallas, United States; Carpet (i); Singles - Doubles	(Australia) Margaret Court; 1–6, 6–3, 11–9	(United States) Billie Jean King	(France) Francoise Durr (United Kingdom) Ann Haydon Jones	(United States) Rosie Casals (United States) Mary Ann Curtis (United States) Patti Hogan (United Kingdom) Virginia Wade
15 Feb.	Eastern Women's Indoor Championships; Waldwick, United States; Wood (i); Singles - Doubles	(United States) Marilyn Aschner; 6–0, 7–5	(United States) Louise Gonnerman	(United States) Sylvia Hooks (United States) Pat Stewart	(United States) Judy Dixon (United States) Doris Henderson (United States) Jennifer Louis (United States) Gay Shaw
15 Feb.	Redcliffe Championships; Redcliffe, Australia; Grass; Singles - Doubles	(Australia) Janet Fallis; 4–6, 6–0, 6–2	(Australia) Robyn Knobel		
16 Feb.	Nice International Winter Championships; Nice, France; Clay; Singles - Doubles	(United States) Pam Austin; 6–4, 6–3	(United Kingdom) Marilyn Greenwood		
16 Feb.	Tournoi de La Châtaigneraie; La Châtaigneraie, France; Clay (i); Singles - Doubles	(France) Gail Chanfreau; 7–5, 7–5	(France) Danièle Bouteleux	(France) Nicole Cazaux (France) Odile de Roubin	(France) Janine Lieffrig (France) M Paillet (France) Marion Cristiani Proisy (France) Anne-Marie Rouchon
16 Feb.	New South Wales Hard Court Championships; Newcastle, Australia; Clay; Singles - Doubles	(Australia) Evonne Goolagong; 6–1, 5–7, 6–3	(Australia) Karen Krantzcke	(Australia) Meryl Brent (Australia) Pat Coleman	(Australia) Helen Amos (Australia) Trisha Edwards (Australia) Sue Hole (Australia) Robyn Murphy
22 Feb	USSR International Indoor Championships; Moscow, Soviet Union; Wood (i); Singles - Doubles	(West Germany) Helga Niessen; 7-5, 2–6, 6-3	(Soviet Union) Olga Morozova	(United Kingdom) Nell Truman (United Kingdom) Joyce Williams	(Soviet Union) Marina Chuvyrina (Soviet Union) Tiiu Parmas (Soviet Union) Maria Kull (Soviet Union) Rauza Islanova
22 Feb	West German Closed Indoor Championships; Hanover, West Germany; Wood (i); Singles - Doubles	(West Germany) Edith Winkens; 6-4, 6-2	(West Germany) Kerstin Seelbach		
22 Feb	Stockton Challenge Cup; Stockton, United States; Hard; Singles - Doubles	(United States) Sharon Walsh; 6–2, 6–3	(United States) Barbara Downs	(United States) Cathie Anderson (United States) Brenda Garcia	
23 Feb.	New England Indoor Championships; Agawam, United States; Carpet (i); Singles - Doubles	(United States) Mary Ann Curtis; 4–6, 6–2, 7–5	(United States) Pam Teeguarden	(South Africa) Esmé Emmanuel (United States) Betty Ann Grubb	(United States) Gail Hansen (United States) Patti Hogan (United States) Stephanie Johnson (United States) Peggy Michel

=== March ===
Ended	Tournament	Winner	Finalist	Semi finalist	Quarter finalist
1 Mar.	Kenya National Championships; Nairobi, Kenya; Grass; Singles - Doubles	(United States) Alice Tym; 6–1, 6–0	(Kenya) Deidre Paterson		
1 Mar.	Philippines International Championships; Manila, Philippines; Clay; Singles - Doubles	(United States) Ceci Martinez; 6–0, 6–0	(Philippines) Patricia Yngayo		
1 Mar.	City of Perth Championships; Perth, Australia; Grass; Singles - Doubles	(Australia) Lesley Hunt; 6–4, 6–1	(Australia) Christine Matison		
1 Mar.	Belgian National Indoor Championships; Brussels, Belgium; Wood (i); Singles - Doubles	(Belgium) Monique Van Haver; 6–2, 6–1	(Belgium) Chantal Van Gheluwe	(Belgium) Michèle Gurdal (Belgium) Odette Jacob	(Belgium) Anne Croonenbergs (Belgium) Marion DeWitte (Belgium) Micheline Five
2 Mar.	Boston Globe U.S. Indoor Championships; Winchester, United States; Neo-Turf Grass (i); Singles - Doubles	(United States) Mary Ann Curtis; 0–6, 6–3, 6–4	(United States) Patti Hogan	(United States) Peaches Bartkowicz (United States) Nancy Richey	(South Africa) Esmé Emmanuel (United States) Betty Ann Grubb (United States) Stephanie Johnson (United States) Val Ziegenfuss
2 Mar.	French Covered Court Championships; Lyon, France; Wood (i); Singles - Doubles	(France) Odile de Roubin; 6–2, 6–2	(France) Gail Chanfreau	(France) Danièle Bouteleux (France) Christiane Spinoza	(France) Sophie Prouvost (France) Francoise Repoux (France) Christiane Sarrazin (South Africa) Joan Wilshere
3 Mar.	Waikiki Professional Challenge; Waikiki, United States; Hard; Singles - Doubles	(United States) Billie Jean King; 6–4, 6–4	(United States) Rosie Casals	(United States) Nancy Richey (United States) Peaches Bartkowicz	(United States) Kathleen Harter (United States) Stephanie Johnson
4 Mar.	Klamovka Indoors; Prague, Czechoslovakia; Hard (i); Singles - Doubles	(Czechoslovakia) Lenka Kodešová; 6–1, 6–0	(Czechoslovakia) Renáta Tomanová	(Czechoslovakia) Blanca Politzerová (Czechoslovakia) Miroslava Koželuhová	(Czechoslovakia) Jitka Volavková
8 Mar.	All Japan Indoor Championships; Tokyo, Japan; Carpet (i); Singles - Doubles	(Japan) Kimiyo Hatanaka; 6–1, 6–3	(Taiwan) Sei-Rei Cho	(Japan) Toshiko Sade (Japan) Junko Sawamatsu	(Taiwan) Lida Ai-Cho (Indonesia) Sumie Gokan
9 Mar.	WLOD International; Pompano Beach, United States; Clay; Singles - Doubles	(United States) Nancy Richey; 6–3, 6–0	(United States) Peaches Bartkowicz	(United States) Chris Evert (United States) Stephanie Johnson	(United States) Betty Ann Grubb (United Kingdom) Nell Truman (United States) Linda Tuero (United States) Val Ziegenfuss
9 Mar.	Cannes International Championships; Cannes, France; Clay; Singles - Doubles	(United Kingdom) Jill Cooper; 6–3, 6–0	(United Kingdom) Veronica Burton	(United Kingdom) Marilyn Greenwood (United Kingdom) Corinne Molesworth	
9 Mar.	South-West Districts Championships; Warrnambool, Australia; Grass; Singles - Doubles	(Australia) Bev Rae; 0–6, 6–2, 6–4	(Australia) Janine Whyte		
10 Mar.	Tournoi de Printemps de Toulouse; Toulouse, France; Clay; Singles - Doubles	(Switzerland) Anne-Marie Studer; 6–3, 6–4	(France) Nicole Hesse-Cazaux		
15 Mar.	Altamira International Invitation; Caracas, Venezuela; Clay; Singles - Doubles	(United States) Mary Ann Curtis; 0–6, 6–2, 6–4	(United States) Patti Hogan	(United States) Betty Ann Grubb (United States) Kathleen Harter	(Czechoslovakia) Alena Palmeová (France) Christiane Spinoza (United States) Pam Teeguarden (Czechoslovakia) Vlasta Vopičková
15 Mar.	Egyptian Open Championships; Cairo, Egypt; Clay; Singles - Doubles	(Soviet Union) Olga Morozova; 6–3, 3–6, 9–7	(Italy) Lea Pericoli	(Czechoslovakia) Marcella Barochová (Czechoslovakia) Ilona Štěpánová-Kurzová	(Egypt) Gaeta Clelia (Egypt) Magda Ezzat (Egypt) Nadia Mansour (Egypt) Sophie Sarwat
16 Mar.	Menton International; Menton, France; Clay; Singles - Doubles	(France) Gail Chanfreau; 6–1, 6–2	(United Kingdom) Corinne Molesworth	(Brazil) Suzana Petersen (Netherlands) Marijke Schaar	(United States) Pam Austin (Australia) Lexie Crooke (Italy) Daniela Porzio (Netherlands) Trudy Walhof
22 Mar.	Dunlop New South Wales Open; Sydney, Australia; Grass; Singles - Doubles	(United States) Billie Jean King; 6–2, 4–6, 6–3	(Australia) Margaret Smith	(United States) Rosie Casals (United Kingdom) Virginia Wade	(France) Francoise Durr (Australia) Wendy Gilchrist (Australia) Karen Krantzcke (United Kingdom) Winnie Shaw
22 Mar.	Nice International Championships; Menton, France; Clay; Singles - Doubles	(France) Gail Chanfreau; 7–5, 6–8, 6–2	(Netherlands) Marijke Schaar	(United States) Marilyn Aschner (United Kingdom) Corinne Molesworth (Netherlands) Marijke Schaar	(United States) Pam Austin (United Kingdom) Jill Cooper (France) Odile de Roubin (Hungary) Eva Szabo
22 Mar.	Alexandria International Championships; Alexandria, Egypt; Clay; Singles - Doubles	(Soviet Union) Olga Morozova; 6–43, 6–0	(Czechoslovakia) Marcella Barochová	(Egypt) Miriam Gad (Czechoslovakia) Ilona Štěpánová-Kurzová	(Egypt) Gaeta Clelia (Soviet Union) Anna Dmitrieva (Egypt) Silva Zaki (Czechoslovakia) Eva Žiláková
22 Mar.	Ciudad of Barranquilla Invitation; Barranquilla, Colombia; Grass; Singles - Doubles	(United States) Mary Ann Curtis; 6–3, 7–5	(United States) Patti Hogan	(United States) Kathleen Harter (United Kingdom) Robin Lloyd	(France) Christiane Spinoza (United States) Pam Teeguarden (United Kingdom) Nell Truman (Czechoslovakia) Vlasta Vopičková
23 Mar.	San Luis Potosi Open International; San Luis Potosi, Mexico; Clay; Singles - Doubles	(Mexico) Elena Subirats; 6–3, 6–4	(Mexico) Lourdes Gongora	(Mexico) Patricia Montano	
24 Mar.	Moroccan International Championships; Casablanca, Morocco; Clay; Singles - Doubles	(France) Jacqueline Morales Lecaillon; 6–3, 3–6, 9–7	(Australia) Jenny Staley Hoad	(Argentina) Graciela Morán (United States) Alice Tym	
26 Mar.	Mashonaland Championships; Salisbury, Rhodesia; Clay; Singles - Doubles	(Rhodesia) Deidre Allan; 6–2, 4–6, 6–4	(Rhodesia) Jenny Waggott	(Rhodesia) Karen Irvine (Rhodesia) Freda Morris	
28 Mar.	Curaçao International Championships; Willemstad, Curaçao; Hard; Singles - Doubles	(United States) Peaches Bartkowicz; 6–4, 6–0	(United Kingdom) Nell Truman	(United Kingdom) Robin Lloyd (United States) Pam Teeguarden	(Netherlands) Ada Bakker (United States) Mary Ann Curtis (United States) Patti Hogan (Hungary) Judit Szorenyi
29 Mar.	Reggio Calabria International; Reggio Calabria, Italy; Clay; Singles - Doubles	(Czechoslovakia) Marie Neumannová; 6–2, 6–3	(Italy) Monica Giorgi	(Italy) Graziela Perna (Argentina) Mabel Vrancovich	(Belgium) Ingrid Loeys (Italy) Maria Nasuelli (Greece) Carol-Ann Kalogeropoulos (West Germany) Almut Sturm
29 Mar.	Greater Jacksonville Open; Jacksonville, United States; Clay; Singles - Doubles	(United States) Nancy Richey; 6–1, 6–3	(United States) Val Ziegenfuss	(United States) Kathy Harter (United States) Stephanie Johnson	(United States) Judy Alvarez (West Germany) Ilse Buding (Sweden) Eva Lundqvist (Czechoslovakia) Vlasta Vopičková
30 Mar.	Monte-Carlo Open Championships; Monte Carlo, Monaco; Clay; Singles - Doubles	(West Germany) Helga Niessen; 9–7, 6–3	(France) Gail Chanfreau	(Italy) Lea Pericoli (France) Odile de Roubin	(Netherlands) Annemieke Blom (Brazil) Suzana Petersen (Netherlands) Marijke Schaar (Netherlands) Trudy Walhof
30 Mar.	Royal Palm Invitational; Miami, United States; Clay; Singles - Doubles	(United States) Susan Epstein; 6–4, 6–1	(United States) Donna Floyd Fales	(United States) Donna Ganz (United States) Kathy Kuykendall	
31 Mar.	North of England Hard Court Championships; Southport, Great Britain; Clay; Singles - Doubles	(Australia) Evonne Goolagong; 6–2, 6–3	(United Kingdom) Joyce Williams	(United Kingdom) Shirley Brasher (United Kingdom) Corinne Molesworth	(United Kingdom) Rita Bentley (United Kingdom) Jill Cooper (United Kingdom) Alex Cowie (United Kingdom) PJ Northern

=== April ===
Ended	Tournament	Winner	Finalist	Semi finalist	Quarter finalist
2 Apr.	Ceylon Championships; Nuwara Eliya, Ceylon; Clay; Singles - Doubles	(Sri Lanka) Wendy Molligodde; 6–2, 1–6, 7–5	(Sri Lanka) S. Abeyegunerwardene	(Sri Lanka) C. Chamugan (Sri Lanka) M. Ferando	
4 Apr.	South African Open Championships; Johannesburg, South Africa; Hard; Singles - Doubles	(Australia) Margaret Court; 6–4, 1–6, 6–3	(United States) Billie Jean King	(United States) Rosie Casals (United Kingdom) Virginia Wade	(South Africa) Marianna Brummer (United Kingdom) Ann Haydon Jones (Australia) Kerry Melville (South Africa) Annette Du Plooy
4 Apr.	En-Tout-Cas Trophy Stalybridge; Stalybridge, Great Britain; Clay; Singles - Doubles	(United Kingdom) Joyce Williams; 6–2, 6–3	(Australia) Evonne Goolagong	(United Kingdom) Rita Bentley (United Kingdom) Jill Cooper	(United Kingdom) Lindsey Beaven (United Kingdom) Veronica Burton (United Kingdom) Jackie Fayter (United Kingdom) Corinne Molesworth
4 Apr.	Caribe Hilton International; San Juan, Puerto Rico; Hard; Singles - Doubles	(United States) Peaches Bartkowicz; 6–1, 6–4	(United States) Val Ziegenfuss	(United States) Tory Fretz (United States) Stephanie Johnson	(United States) Mary Ann Curtis (United States) Kathy Harter (United States) Patti Hogan (Italy) Maria Nasuelli
4 Apr.	Beausoleil Championships; Monte Carlo, Monaco; Clay; Singles - Doubles	(Hungary) Katalin Borka; 6–4, 6–2	(Netherlands) Marijke Schaar	(United States) Marilyn Aschner (West Germany) Trudy Walhof	(France) Valeria Cantenot (Brazil) Suzana Petersen (Hungary) Erzsébet Polgár (France) Odile de Roubin
5 Apr.	Catania International Open; Catania, Italy; Clay; Singles - Doubles	(Sweden) Christina Sandberg; 6–3, 6–0	(United States) Pam Austin	(Czechoslovakia) Marie Pinterová (Italy) Daniela Porzio	(Italy) Giulia Biondi (Italy) Miss Giarrusso (Sweden) Ulla Sandulf (Argentina) Mabel Vrancovich
5 Apr.	California All-Comers Championships 5th ed (also valid as San Jose State All-Comers) Spartan Tennis Complex; San Jose, United States; Hard; Singles - Doubles	(United States) Barbara Downs; 6–2, 8–6	(United States) Farel Footman	(United States) Eliza Pande (United States) Sharon Walsh	(United States) Ann Kiyomura (United States) Kate Latham (United States) Judy Louie
6 Apr.	Natal Open Championships; Durban, South Africa; Hard; Singles - Doubles	(United States) Billie Jean King; 6–2, 8–6	(Australia) Margaret Court	(United Kingdom) Ann Haydon Jones (United Kingdom) Winnie Shaw	(Australia) Judy Tegart-Dalton (France) Francoise Durr (Australia) Lesley Hunt (South Africa) Pat Walkden
9 Apr.	Sicilian International Championships; Palermo, Italy; Clay; Singles - Doubles	(Sweden) Christina Sandberg; 6–0, 6–3	(United States) Pam Austin	(Sweden) Ulla Sandulf (Argentina) Mabel Vrancovich	(Chile) Ana María Arias (Greece) Carol Kalogeropoulos (Sweden) Madeleine Pegel (Italy) Daniela Porzio
11 Apr.	Kingston International Championships; Kingston, Jamaica; Hard; Singles - Doubles	(United States) Peaches Bartkowicz; 6–0, 5–7, 6–3	(United States) Kathy Harter	(United Kingdom) Nell Truman (France) Christiane Spinoza	(West Germany) Ilse Buding (United Kingdom) Robin Lloyd (Sweden) Eva Lundquist (United States) Isabel Ortiz
12 Apr.	Nice International Championships (Note: Two editions of Nice International were held in 1970.); Menton, France; Clay; Singles - Doubles	(West Germany) Helga Niessen; 6–2, 8–6	(United States) Julie Heldman	(France) Gail Chanfreau (France) Odile de Roubin	(United States) Marilyn Aschner (Hungary) Katalin Borka (France) Danièle Bouteleux (Netherlands) Betty Stove
12 Apr.	En-Tout-Cas Trophy Poole; Poole, Great Britain; Clay; Singles - Doubles	(United Kingdom) Joyce Williams; 6–2, 6–0	(Australia) Evonne Goolagong	(United Kingdom) Jill Cooper (United Kingdom) Corinne Molesworth	(United Kingdom) Lindsey Beaven (United Kingdom) Rita Bentley (United Kingdom) Veronica Burton (United Kingdom) Jackie Fayter
12 Apr.	St. Petersburg Masters Invitational; St. Petersburg, United States; Clay; Singles - Doubles	(United States) Nancy Richey; 6–0, 6–2	(United States) Judy Alvarez	(United States) Stephanie Johnson (Colombia) Isabel Fernández de Soto	(United States) Mary Ann Curtis (United States) Kerry Harris (United States) Sue Stap (United States) Val Ziegenfuss
13 Apr.	Jerusalem International Invitation; Jerusalem YMCA Sports Center; Jerusalem, Israel; Clay; Singles - Doubles	(Australia) Helen Amos; 6–0, 6–1	(Israel) Tamar Hayat		
18 Apr.	Rothman's Cumberland Club Hard Court Tournament; Hampstead, Great Britain; Clay; Singles - Doubles	(Australia) Evonne Goolagong; 6–0, 6–6	(United Kingdom) Jill Cooper	(United States) Marilyn Aschner (United Kingdom) Shirley Brasher	(United Kingdom) Corinne Molesworth (Australia) Faye Toyne-Moore (Australia) Patricia Edwards (United Kingdom) Janice Townsend
19 Apr.	Monagasque Open; Monte Carlo, Monaco; Clay; Singles - Doubles	(West Germany) Helga Niessen; 6–4, 6–1	(Australia) Kerry Melville	(France) Francoise Durr (United States) Billie Jean King	(United States) Rosie Casals (United States) Julie Heldman (Australia) Karen Krantzcke (United Kingdom) Virginia Wade
19 Apr.	Torneo Internazionale di Tennis Parioli; Rome, Italy; Clay; Singles - Doubles	(Brazil) Suzana Petersen; 5–7, 6–3, 8–6	(Chile) Ana María Arias	(Italy) Daniela Marzano (Argentina) Mabel Vrancovich	(United States) Pam Austin (Australia) Lexie Kenny (Italy) Maria Monam (United States) Ceci Martinez
20 Apr.	Carolina Spring Invitation; Charlotte, United States; Clay; Singles - Doubles	(United States) Nancy Richey; 6–0, 6–2	(Czechoslovakia) Alena Palmeová	(United States) Laura duPont (Czechoslovakia) Vlasta Vopičková	(United States) Mary Ann Curtis (United States) Donna Floyd Fales (United Kingdom) Robin Lloyd (United States) Stephanie Johnson
20 Apr.	Natanya International Invitation; Netanya, Israel; Hard; Singles - Doubles	(Romania) Judith Dibar; 6–4, 6–1	(Australia) Helen Amos		
25 Apr.	Rothmans Sutton Hard Court Championships; Sutton, Great Britain; Clay; Singles - Doubles	(Australia) Margaret Court; 6–3, 6–3	(United Kingdom) Ann Haydon Jones	(Australia) Patricia Edwards (United Kingdom) Joyce Williams	(Australia) Evonne Goolagong (South Africa) Brenda Kirk (United Kingdom) Faye Toyne-Moore (United Kingdom) Janice Townsend
26 Apr.	Anaheim Open; Anaheim, United States; Hard; Singles - Doubles	(United States) Kristien Kemmer; 6–2, 6–0	(United States) Laurie Tenney	(United States) Whitney Grant (United States) Linda Lewis	(United States) Wendy Appleby (United States) Bess Hagey (United States) Janice Metcalf (United States) Marita Redondo
26 Apr.	Israel Spring International Championships; Tel Aviv, Israel; Clay; Singles - Doubles	(Romania) Judith Dibar; 6–2, 6–0	(Australia) Helen Amos	(Romania) Eleanora Dumitrescu (Romania) Ecaterina Horsa	
26 Apr.	Ojai Tennis Tournament; Ojai, United States; Clay; Singles - Doubles	(United States) Janet Newberry; 4–6, 6–3, 6–2	(United States) Sharon Walsh	(United States) Betty Ann Grubb (United States) Pixie Lamm	(United States) Dodo Cheney (United States) Gail Hansen (United States) Kris Kemmer (United States) Eliza Pande
26 Apr.	Beaulieu International Championships; Beaulieu-sur-Mer, France; Clay; Singles - Doubles	(South Africa) Laura Rossouw; 6–2, 6–3	(Canada) Andrée Martin	(France) Danièle Bouteleux (Netherlands) Gertruida Walhof	(United Kingdom) Jill Cooper (Sweden) Ingrid Bentzer (Italy) Monique Di Maso (West Germany) Edith Winkens
27 Apr.	Italian Open Championships; Rome, Italy; Clay; Singles - Doubles	(United States) Billie Jean King; 6–1, 6–3	(United States) Julie Heldman	(United Kingdom) Virginia Wade (South Africa) Pat Walkden	(United States) Rosie Casals (France) Françoise Durr (West Germany) Helga Niessen (Australia) Karen Krantzcke

=== May ===
Ended	Tournament	Winner	Finalist	Semi finalist	Quarter finalist
2 May.	Lebanon International Championships; Beirut, Lebanon; Clay; Singles - Doubles	(Canada) Andrée Martin; 4–6, 6–2, 6–3	(Canada) Jane O'Hara	(France) Mrs Jeannin (Brazil) Suzana Petersen	
2 May.	Rothmans British Hard Court Championships; Bournemouth, Great Britain; Clay; Singles - Doubles	(Australia) Margaret Court; 6–2, 6–3	(United Kingdom) Virginia Wade	(Australia) Judy Dalton (Australia) Evonne Goolagong	(United States) Julie Heldman (United States) Billie Jean King (Australia) Karen Krantzcke (United Kingdom) Joyce Williams
3 May.	California State Championships; Portola Valley, United States; Hard; Singles - Doubles	(United States) Eliza Pande; 6–2, 6–3	(United States) Sharon Walsh	(South Africa) Esmé Emmanuel (United States) Gail Hansen	(United States) Barbara Downs (United States) Kate Latham (United States) Marcelyn Louie (United States) Mimi Arnold-Wheeler
3 May.	River Plate Championships; Buenos Aires, Argentina; Clay; Singles - Doubles	(Argentina) Beatriz Araujo; 6–1, 1–6, 6–1	(France) Françoise Dürr		
3 May.	Kansas City Open; Kansas City, United States; Hard; Singles - Doubles	(United States) Kristy Pigeon; 6–1, 1–6, 6–1	(United States) Denise Carter	(United States) Betty Ann Grubb (United States) Val Ziegenfuss	(United States) Peaches Bartkowicz (United States) Mary Ann Curtis (United States) Stephanie Johnson (United States) Karen Susman
9 May.	Rothmans Surrey Hard Court Championships; Guildford, Great Britain; Clay; Singles - Doubles	(Australia) Margaret Court; 6–4, 6–2	(United States) Patti Hogan	(France) Gail Chanfreau (Australia) Judy Dalton	(United Kingdom) Shirley Brasher (Australia) Evonne Goolagong (Australia) Karen Krantzcke (South Africa) Pat Walkden
9 May.	Bio-Strath Tally Ho; Edgbaston, Great Britain; Clay; Singles - Doubles	(United Kingdom) Janice Townsend; 6–4, 6–2	(Ecuador) Maria Guzman	(United Kingdom) Marilyn Greenwood (Australia) Barbara Walsh	
10 May.	Sabadell International; Sabadell, Spain; Clay; Singles - Doubles	(West Germany) Brigitte Schoene; 6–2, 6–1	(Spain) Eliana Niort	(Australia) Ann Phillips-Moore (Spain) Carmen Renom	
10 May.	Southern California Championships; Los Angeles, United States; Hard; Singles - Doubles	(United States) Janet Newberry; 6–2, 6–3	(United States) Kris Kemmer	(United States) Miss Austin (United States) Barbara Green-Weigandt	(United States) Dodo Cheney (United States) Evelyn Houseman (United States) Marita Redondo (United States) Janice Metcalf
10 May.	Central California Championships. Sacramento, United States; Hard; Singles - Doubles	(United States) Nancy Richey; 10–8, 2–6, 6–3	(United States) Denise Carter	(United States) Kathy Harter (United States) Val Ziegenfuss	(South Africa) Esmé Emmanuel (United States) Kristy Pigeon (United States) Carolyn Ishii (United States) Sharon Walsh
10 May.	Northern California Sectional Championships; San Francisco, United States; Hard; Singles - Doubles	(United States) Marcie Louie; 10–8, 6–0	(United States) Barbara Downs	(United States) Kate Latham (United States) Judy Louie	(South Africa) Esmé Emmanuel (United States) Kristy Pigeon (United States) Carolyn Ishii (United States) Sharon Walsh
10 May.	Westchester County Championships; Armonk, United States; Hard; Singles - Doubles	(United States) Louise Gonnerman; 0–6, 6–3, 6–4	(United States) Pat Stewart	(United States) Sylvia Hooks (United States) Vilja Tamusz	(United States) Beatrice Adler (United States) Jennifer Louis (United States) Helen Palmer (United States) Donna Stockton
16 May.	Bio-Strath London Hard Court Championships; Fulham, Great Britain; Clay; Singles - Doubles	(United Kingdom) Ann Haydon Jones; 6–4, 6–2	(United Kingdom) Joyce Williams	(Australia) Margaret Court (Australia) Evonne Goolagong	(Australia) Helen Gourlay (United States) Patti Hogan (South Africa) Annette Du Plooy (South Africa) Pat Walkden
16 May.	Bio-Strath Droitwich; Droitwich Spa, Great Britain; Clay; Singles - Doubles	(Ecuador) María Guzmán; 6–2, 12–10	(Australia) Sandra Walsham	(United Kingdom) Janice Townsend (France) Johanne Venturino	(United Kingdom) Judy Congdon (United Kingdom) Marilyn Greenwood (United Kingdom) Wendy Hall (Australia) Barbara Walsh
17 May.	Jacksonville Invitation; Jacksonville, United States; Hard; Singles - Doubles	(Colombia) Isabel Fernández de Soto; 6–0, 6–2	(United States) Toni Kramer		
17 May.	Houston City Championships; Houston, United States; Hard; Singles - Doubles	(United States) Daryl Gralka; 3–6, 6–4, 6–4	(United States) Becky Vest	(United States) Mary McLean (United States) Bambi Schuette	
18 May.	Belgian Open Championships; Brussels, Belgium; Clay; Singles - Doubles	(United States) Julie Heldman; 6–1, 6–2	(United States) Peaches Bartkowicz	(France) Francoise Durr (United Kingdom) Winnie Shaw	(South Africa) Marianna Brummer (United States) Mary Ann Curtis (United States) Wendy Overton (Brazil) Suzana Petersen
18 May.	West Berlin Open Championships; West Berlin, West Germany; Clay; Singles - Doubles	(United Kingdom) Virginia Wade; 10–8, 6–1	(West Germany) Helga Niessen	(United States) Billie Jean King (Australia) Karen Krantzcke	(United States) Rosie Casals (France) Gail Chanfreau (Australia) Judy Tegart-Dalton (West Germany) Helga Hosl
23 May.	Bio-Strath Wolverhampton Open; Wolverhampton, Great Britain; Clay; Singles - Doubles	(Australia) Kerry Melville; 6–2, 6–2	(United Kingdom) Sue Alexander	(United States) Farel Footman (United Kingdom) Wendy Hall	(United States) Pamela Austin (Canada) Janice Tindle (United Kingdom) Janice Townsend (Australia) Sandra Walsham
23 May.	Lee-on-Solent Open; Lee-on-Solent, Great Britain; Hard; Singles - Doubles	(Australia) Helen Gourlay; 6–4, 6–4	(South Africa) Pat Walkden	(United States) Patricia Cody (United Kingdom) Sally Holdsworth	
24 May.	Federation Cup; Freiburg, West Germany; Clay; 22 teams knockout	Australia	West Germany	Great Britain; United States	France; Netherlands; Sweden; South Africa
24 May.	Bay Counties Championships (also known as the Bay Counties Invitational); Tiburon, United States; Clay; Singles - Doubles	(United States) Marcie Louie; 3–6, 6–1, 6–2	(United States) Eliza Pande	(United States) Barbara Downs (United States) L Tenney	(United States) Diane Brooks (United States) Diana Gai (United States) Anne Lamott (United States) Sharon Russell
30 May.	Rothmans Surrey Grass Court Championships; Surbiton, Great Britain; Grass; Singles - Doubles	(United Kingdom) Ann Haydon Jones; 2–6, 6–3, 6–4	(United States) Patti Hogan	(United States) Mary Ann Curtis (United Kingdom) Joyce Williams	(Australia) Evonne Goolagong (United Kingdom) Corinne Molesworth (United Kingdom) Winnie Shaw (United States) Val Ziegenfuss
30 May.	Cardiff Open (valid as Glamorganshire Championships); Cardiff, Great Britain; Grass; Singles - Doubles	(United Kingdom) Marilyn Greenwood; 2–6, 6–3, 6–4	(Australia) Frances Luff	(United Kingdom) Wendy Hall (Australia) Barbara Walsh	(United Kingdom) Elizabeth Ernest (Ecuador) María Guzmán (United Kingdom) Jenny Helliar
30 May.	St. Annes Open; Lytham St Annes, Great Britain; Clay; Singles - Doubles	(Australia) Sandra Walsham; 6–4, 6–2	(United Kingdom) Janice Townsend	(Australia) Sue Alexander (United Kingdom) Mandy Holdsworth	(United Kingdom) Judy Congdon (Canada) Janice Tindle

=== June ===
Ended	Tournament	Winner	Finalist	Semi finalist	Quarter finalist
1 Jun.	Tulsa Invitation; Tulsa, United States; Clay; Singles - Doubles	(United States) Stephanie Johnson; 6–1, 6–4	(United States) Janet Newberry	(United States) Betty Ann Grubb (United States) Linda Tuero	(United States) Barbara Grubb (United States) Kathy Kraft (Mexico) Elena Subirats (United States) Janet Thomas
1 Jun.	Connecticut State Championships; New Haven, United States; Grass; Singles - Doubles	(United States) Judy Dixon; 13–11, 6–4	(United States) Louise Gonnerman	(United States) Lisa Rosenblum (United States) Jade Schiffman	(United States) Paula Albert (United States) Ann Murphy (United States) Donna Stockton (United States) Mary Wisnieski
1 Jun.	Leaside Invitation; Toronto, Canada; Clay; Singles - Doubles	(Canada) Benita Senn; 6–1, 6–3	(Canada) Louise Brown	(Canada) S Arnold (Canada) Inge Weber	
6 Jun.	Chichester International; Chichester, Great Britain; Grass; Singles - Doubles	(United Kingdom) Ann Haydon Jones; 6–4, 6–2	(United Kingdom) Joyce Williams	(South Africa) Esmé Emmanuel (Ecuador) María Guzmán	(United States) Mary Ann Curtis (South Africa) Brenda Kirk (United States) Ceci Martinez (United Kingdom) Corinne Molesworth
6 Jun.	Rothmans Northern Championships; Manchester, Great Britain; Grass; Singles - Doubles	(Australia) Kerry Melville; 6–3, 6–1	(United States) Carole Graebner	(United Kingdom) Janice Townsend (United Kingdom) Winnie Shaw	(United States) Alex Cowie (United States) Kristy Pigeon (United Kingdom) Nell Truman (United States) Val Ziegenfuss
6 Jun.	Chapel Allerton Open. Chapel Allerton, Great Britain; Grass; Singles - Doubles	(Canada) Jane O'Hara; 6–4, 6–2	(Australia) Barbara Walsh		
6 Jun.	Bielefeld International; Bielefeld, West Germany; Clay; Singles - Doubles	(South Africa) Laura Rossouw; 6–4, 6–2	(United States) Kathy Harter	(West Germany) Katja Ebbinghaus (West Germany) Heide Orth	
6 Jun.	Scarborough C.C. Invitation; Scarborough, Canada; Grass; Singles - Doubles	(Canada) Inge Weber; 5–7, 6–3, 6–3	(Canada) Louise Brown	(Canada) Benita Senn (Canada) Judy Travis	
7 Jun.	New York State Women's Championships; Mamaroneck, United States; Grass; Singles - Doubles	(United States) Marjorie Gengler; 5–7, 6–4, 6–2	(United States) Louise Gonnerman	(United States) Sylvia Hooks (United States) Pat Stewart	(United States) Joanne Dukeshire (United States) Jennifer Louis (United States) Jade Schiffman
7 Jun.	French Open. Paris, France; Clay; Singles - Doubles	(Australia) Margaret Court; 6–2, 6–4	(West Germany) Helga Niessen	(United States) Julie Heldman (Australia) Karen Krantzcke	(United States) Rosemary Casals (United States) Billie Jean King (Czechoslovakia) Vlasta Vopičková (United Kingdom) Virginia Wade
7 Jun.	French Open. Paris, France; Clay; Singles - Doubles	(France) Gail Chanfreau (France) Françoise Dürr; 6–1, 3–6, 6–3	(United States) Rosemary Casals (United States) Billie Jean King	(United States) Julie Heldman (Australia) Karen Krantzcke	(United States) Rosemary Casals (United States) Billie Jean King (Czechoslovakia) Vlasta Vopičková (United Kingdom) Virginia Wade
7 Jun.	Mountain View Open; Mountain View, United States; Hard; Singles - Doubles	(United States) Ann Kiyomura; 7–5, 4–6, 6–0	(United States) Kate Latham	(United States) Barbara Downs (United States) Diana Gai	(United States) Judy Louie (United States) Maureen O´Keefe (Mexico) Elena Subirats
13 Jun.	Wightman Cup; Wimbledon, Great Britain; Grass	United States; 4–3 (rubbers)	Great Britain		
13 Jun.	Wills Open West of England Championships; Bristol, Great Britain; Grass; Singles - Doubles	(Australia) Margaret Court; 6–4, 6–2	(France) Francoise Durr	(Australia) Judy Dalton (Australia) Lesley Hunt	(United States) Rosie Casals (Australia) Kerry Melville (Sweden) Christina Sandberg (Netherlands) Betty Stöve
13 Jun.	Rothmans Kent Championships; Beckenham, Great Britain; Grass; Singles - Doubles	(United States) Patti Hogan; 6–4, 6–2	(Soviet Union) Olga Morozova	(United Kingdom) Corinne Molesworth (South Africa) Pat Walkden	(South Africa) Daphne Botha (South Africa) Annette Du Plooy (Australia) Evonne Goolagong (Australia) Helen Gourlay
13 Jun.	John Player Nottingham Tennis Tournament; Nottingham, Great Britain; Grass; Singles - Doubles	(South Africa) Esmé Emmanuel; 6–2, 6–4	(Netherlands) Judith Salomé	(United Kingdom) Alex Cowie (Brazil) Suzana Petersen	(Australia) Helen Amos (Australia) Helen Kayser (United States) Ceci Martinez (Canada) Janice Tindle
14 Jun.	Blue Gray Championships; Montgomery, United States; Clay; Singles - Doubles	(United States) Laura duPont; 6–1, 6–2	(United States) Kathy Kraft	(Mexico) Lulu Gongora (Mexico) Elena Subirats	
20 Jun.	Eastern Clay Court Championships; Mamaroneck, United States; Grass; Singles - Doubles	(United States) Louise Gonnerman; 8–6, 10–8	(United States) Pat Stewart	(United States) Sylvia Hooks (United States) Mimi Kanarek	(United States) Joanne Dukeshire (United States) Mariane Godsick (United States) Vija Vuskains Tamusz
20 Jun.	NCAA Women's Tennis Championships; Las Cruces, United States; Grass; Singles - Doubles	(United States) Laura duPont; 1–6, 6–4, 6–4	(United States) Linda Tuero	(United States) Mona Schallau (United States) Mary Struthers	(United States) Maricaye Christenson (United States) Marjorie Gengler (United States) Pixie Lamm (United States) Pam Richmond
20 Jun.	Rothmans Open London Championships; London, Great Britain; Grass; Singles - Doubles	(Australia) Margaret Court; 2–6, 8–6, 6–2	(United Kingdom) Winnie Shaw	(Australia) Kerry Melville (South Africa) Pat Walkden	(France) Gail Chanfreau (Australia) Helen Gourlay (United States) Patti Hogan (Australia) Karen Krantzcke
20 Jun.	Rothmans Open South of England Championships; Eastbourne, Great Britain; Grass; Singles - Doubles	(United Kingdom) Ann Haydon Jones; 8–6, 6–1	(United Kingdom) Virginia Wade	(Australia) Judy Dalton (France) Françoise Dürr	(Netherlands) Ada Bakker (Australia) Lesley Hunt (Greece) Carol-Ann Kalogeropoulos (Netherlands) Betty Stöve
21 Jun.	Southeastern Invitation; Columbus, United States; Clay; Singles - Doubles	(United States) Chris Evert; 6–1, 6–1	(Mexico) Elena Subirats	(Mexico) Lulu Gongora (United States) Peggy Moore	(United States) Kathy Kraft (Mexico) Cecilia Rosado (United States) Linda Wert
23 Jun.	Long Island Clay Court Championships; Port Washington, United States; Clay; Singles - Doubles	(United States) Mimi Kanarek; 6–1, 6–1	(United States) Sylvia Hooks	(United States) Zandi Nammack (United States) Pat Stewart	(United States) Miss Bezdek (United States) Patricia Jean Shaffer (United States) Vija Tamuzs
28 Jun.	Western Pennsylvania Championships; Mt. Lebanon, United States; Grass; Singles - Doubles	(United States) Laura duPont; 2–6, 7–5, 6–3	(United States) Connie Capozzi	(United States) Marjorie Gengler (United States) Pam Richmond	(United States) Maricaye Christenson (United States) Margie Cooper (United States) Pam Farmer (United States) Mary Struthers

=== July ===
Ended	Tournament	Winner	Finalist	Semi finalist	Quarter finalist	
1 Jul.	Southern Championships; Birmingham, United States; Clay; Singles - Doubles	(United States) Linda Tuero; 6–1, 7–5	(United States) Roberta Baumgardner	(United States) Lulu Gongora (United States) Sue Vinton	(United States) Anne Hutcheson (United States) Kathy Kraft (United States) Ann Templeton (United States) Linda Wert	
1 Jul.	Moore Park Invitation; Toronto, Canada; Hard; Singles - Doubles	(Canada) Faye Urban; 6–1, 6–1	(Canada) Benita Senn	(Canada) Louise Brown (Canada) Inge Weber	(Canada) Sharon Arnold (Canada) Joan Bak (Canada) Judy Travis	
3 Jul.	Wimbledon Plate; Wimbledon, Great Britain; Grass; Singles - Doubles	(Australia) Evonne Goolagong; 6–3, 6–1	(Indonesia) Lita Liem	(United Kingdom) Veronica Burton (Soviet Union) Olga Morozova	(United Kingdom) Lindsey Beaven (United States) Kathy Harter (Indonesia) Lany Kaligis (South Africa) Laura Rossouw	
4 Jul.	Wimbledon Championships; London, Great Britain; Grass; Singles - Doubles	(Australia) Margaret Court; 14–12, 11–9	(United States) Billie Jean King	(United States) Rosie Casals (France) Françoise Dürr	(United States) Ceci Martinez (West Germany) Helga Niessen (Australia) Karen Krantzcke (United Kingdom) Winnie Shaw	
4 Jul.	Wimbledon Championships; London, Great Britain; Grass; Singles - Doubles	(United States) Rosie Casals (United States) Billie Jean King; 6–2, 6–3	(France) Françoise Dürr (United Kingdom) Virginia Wade	(United States) Rosie Casals (France) Françoise Dürr	(United States) Ceci Martinez (West Germany) Helga Niessen (Australia) Karen Krantzcke (United Kingdom) Winnie Shaw	
5 Jul.	Fulda Tournament (Closed); Fulda, West Germany; Clay; Singles - Doubles	(West Germany) Ameli Ring; 6–0, 6–2	(West Germany) Helga Niessen			
5 Jul.	Tilburg International; Tilburg, Netherlands; Clay; Singles - Doubles	(Netherlands) Marijke Schaar; 6–4, 9–7	(Netherlands) Tine Zwaan	(Finland) Birgitta Lindström (Australia) Frances Luff	(Australia) Adrienne Avis (Australia) Helen Sheedy (Belgium) Lucette Sliepen	
5 Jul.	Championships of the Czech Republic; Litvínov, Czechoslovakia; Clay; Singles - Doubles	(Czechoslovakia) Vlasta Vopičková; 6–3, 6–1	(Czechoslovakia) Alena Palmeová	(Czechoslovakia) Miloslava Holubová (Czechoslovakia) Marie Neumannová		
5 Jul.	Tennessee Valley Invitational; Chattanooga, United States; Clay; Singles - Doubles	(United States) Linda Tuero; 6–2, 6–3	(United States) Becky Vest	(United States) Susan Eastman (United States) Jade Schiffman	(Mexico) Lulu Gongora (United States) Susan Vinton (United States) Jean Weckwerth (United States) Linda Wert	
5 Jul.	Oakland City Championships (43rd Edition); Piedmont, United States; Hard; Singles - Doubles	(United States) Pat Welles; 6–3, 6–4	(United States) Sue Mehmedbasich	(United States) Arlene Cohen (United States) June Gay	(United States) Julia Beymer (United States) Jayne Florence (United States) Farel Footman (United States) Susan Reed	
5 Jul.	Travemünde International; Travemünde, West Germany; Clay; Singles - Doubles	(Hungary) Erzsébet Polgár; 6–0, 6–2	(Hungary) Katalin Borka	(Brazil) Suzana Petersen (West Germany) Edith Winkens		
11 Jul.	Carroll’s Irish Open Championships; Dublin, Republic of Ireland; Grass; Singles - Doubles	(United Kingdom) Virginia Wade; 6–3, 6–3	(United States) Val Ziegenfuss	(Australia) Karen Krantzcke (Australia) Kerry Melville	(United States) Julie Heldman (United States) Wendy Overton (United States) Pam Teeguarden (South Africa) Pat Walkden	
11 Jul.	Scottish Championships; Edinburgh, Great Britain; Grass; Singles - Doubles	(United Kingdom) Winnie Shaw; 6–3, 6–8, 12–10	(United Kingdom) Joyce Williams	(South Africa) Esmé Emmanuel (United States) Ceci Martinez		
11 Jul.	Green Shield Welsh Open Championships; Newport, Great Britain; Grass; Singles - Doubles	(Australia) Evonne Goolagong; 6–0, 8–6	(United States) Patti Hogan	(United Kingdom) Ann Haydon Jones (South Africa) Laura Rossouw	(Australia) Judy Tegart-Dalton (Australia) Patricia Edwards (Australia) Lesley Hunt (Australia) Faye Moore	
11 Jul.	Bio-Strath Malvern Tournament; Malvern, Great Britain; Grass; Singles - Doubles	(Australia) Helen Gourlay; 6–3, 6–2	(Ecuador) María Guzmán	(United Kingdom) Janice Townsend (Australia) Sandra Walsham	(Australia) Sue Alexander (South Africa) Daphne Botha (Australia) Lexie Crooke (United Kingdom) Marilyn Greenwood	
11 Jul.	East of England Championships; Felixstowe, Great Britain; Grass; Singles - Doubles	(United Kingdom) Corinne Molesworth; 2–6, 6–4, 6–2	(United Kingdom) Robin Lloyd	(United Kingdom) Marilyn Beven (United Kingdom) Alex Cowie	(United States) Tish Adams (United Kingdom) Lindsay Blachford (South Africa) Christine Gouws (United Kingdom) Penny Hardgrave	
11 Jul.	12 Jul.	Düsseldorf International; Düsseldorf, West Germany; Clay; Singles - Doubles	(West Germany) Helga Hosl; 7–5, 6–4	(West Germany) Helga Niessen	(Italy) Fiorella Bonicelli (Netherlands) Betty Stöve	(West Germany) Heidi Eisterlehner (West Germany) Jana Kunstfeldova (West Germany) Heide Orth (France) Christiane Spinoza
Swedish Open Championships; Båstad, Sweden; Clay; Singles - Doubles	12 Jul.	(United States) Peaches Bartkowicz; 6–1, 6–1	(Sweden) Ingrid Bentzer	(France) Gail Chanfreau (United States) Kathy Harter	(Chile) Ana María Arias (France) Francoise Durr (Indonesia) Lita Liem (Sweden) Christina Sandberg	
La Jolla Championships (also La Jolla Summer Tournament); La Jolla, United States; Hard; Singles - Doubles	12 Jul.	(United States) Marita Redondo; 2–6, 6–3, 6–1	(United States) Cathy Anderson	(United States) Dodo Cheney (United States) Chris Mattson	(United States) Sally Ride (United States) Ruan Smith (United States) Cindy Thomas (United States) Georgia Turner	
Dixieland Championship; Birmingham, United States; Clay; Singles - Doubles	12 Jul.	(United States) Linda Tuero; 6–1, 8–6	(United States) Becky Vest	(Mexico) Lulu Gongora (Mexico) Cecilia Rosado	(United States) Ann Hutcheson (United States) Vicky Smouse (United States) Ann Templeton	
Virginia-Carolina Invitation; Richmond, United States; Clay; Singles - Doubles	12 Jul.	(United States) Laura duPont; 6–1, 8–6	(United States) Carol Bentley	(United States) Raymonde Jones (United States) Margeret Russo	(United States) Sosie Hublitz (United States) Nancy Reed	
14 Jul.	Centropa Cup (singles) (Central European U23 Championship); Krynica, Poland; Clay	(West Germany) Katja Ebbinghaus; 6–3, 3–6, 6–4	(Netherlands) Ada Bakker			
14 Jul.	Centropa Cup (team) (Central European U23 Championship); Krynica, Poland; Clay	Germany	Hungary	Czechoslovakia; Netherlands	Austria; Poland; Switzerland	
18 Jul.	Rothmans Open North of England Championships; Hoylake, Great Britain; Grass; Singles - Doubles	(Australia) Evonne Goolagong; 2–6, 6–2, 6–1	(Australia) Kerry Melville	(Australia) Judy Dalton (United States) Patti Hogan	(United States) Julie Heldman (South Africa) Brenda Kirk (Australia) Karen Krantzcke (United Kingdom) Virginia Wade	
18 Jul.	Bio-Strath Edgbaston Tournament; Edgbaston, Great Britain; Grass; Singles - Doubles	(Australia) Sandra Walsham; 1–6, 7–5, 6–1	(Argentina) Beatriz Araujo	(Ecuador) María Guzmán (United Kingdom) Janice Townsend	(Australia) Sue Alexander (United Kingdom) Sharon Cogswell (United Kingdom) Mary McAnally (United Kingdom) Jane Poynder	
19 Jul.	Swiss Open Championships; Gstaad, Switzerland; Clay; Singles - Doubles	(United States) Rosie Casals; 6–2, 5–7, 6–2	(France) Françoise Dürr	(West Germany) Helga Niessen (Netherlands) Betty Stöve	(South Africa) Esmé Emmanuel (Italy) Lea Pericoli (United States) Ceci Martinez (Japan) Junko Sawamatsu	
19 Jul.	Czechoslovakian International Championships; Bratislava, Czechoslovakia; Clay; Singles - Doubles	(Czechoslovakia) Vlasta Vopičková; 6–4, 6–4	(United States) Val Ziegenfuss	(Hungary) Katalin Borka (United States) Stephanie Johnson	(Czechoslovakia) Lenka Kodešová (Czechoslovakia) Mirka Koželuhová (Czechoslovakia) Olga Lendlová (United States) Wendy Overton	
19 Jul.	Essex Championships; Frinton-on-Sea, Great Britain; Grass; Singles - Doubles	(Australia) Margaret Court; 2–6, 7–5, 6–2	(United Kingdom) Ann Haydon Jones	(United Kingdom) Lindsey Beaven (United Kingdom) Nell Truman	(United Kingdom) Lindsay Blachford (United Kingdom) Alex Cowie (United Kingdom) Corinne Molesworth (New Zealand) Marilyn Pryde	
19 Jul.	Pacific Northwest Championships; Tacoma, United States; Clay; Singles - Doubles	(United States) Chris Mattson; 1–6, 6–4, 6–0	(United States) Mary McLean	(United States) Jan Hasse (United States) Maureen O ´Keefe	(United States) Michelle Carey (United States) Hedy Jackson (United States) Doreen Irish (United States) Sally Ride	
19 Jul.	Belgian National Hard Court Championships; Brussels, Belgium; Clay; Singles - Doubles	(Belgium) Monique Van Haver; 2–6, 7–5, 6–2	(Belgium) Michele Kahn	(Belgium) Micheline Five (Belgium) Michèle Gurdal	(Belgium) Monique Bedoret (Belgium) Viviane Geerts (Belgium) Janine Michiels (Belgium) Lisette Sliepen	
19 Jul.	Le Touquet International Championship; Le Touquet, France; Clay; Singles - Doubles	(Australia) Lesley Hunt; 2–6, 7–5, 6–2	(France) Odile de Roubin	(France) Nathalie Fuchs (Brazil) Suzana Petersen	(France) M. C. Brochard (France) Anne Marie Cassaigne (France) Florence Guédy (France) S. Pruvot	
19 Jul.	20 Jul.	Martin John Kennedy Invitation (also St. Louis Invitational); St. Louis, United States; Clay; Singles - Doubles	(United States) Carol Hanks Aucamp; 6–1, 8–6	(United States) Barbara Krueger	(United States) Raymonde Jones (United States) Margeret Russo	(United States) Sosie Hublitz (United States) Nancy Reed
25 Jul.	Golden Racket Trophy; Aix-en-Provence, France; Clay; Singles - Doubles	(Uruguay) Fiorella Bonicelli; 11–9, 4–6, 6–1	(France) Odile de Roubin	(Japan) Kimiyo Hatanaka (United States) Kristy Pigeon	(United States) Denise Carter (Greece) Carol-Ann Kalogeropouloss (France) Johanne Venturino (France) Jaqueline Vives	
25 Jul.	Green Shield Midland Open Championships; Leicester, Great Britain; Grass; Singles - Doubles	(Australia) Evonne Goolagong; 6–3, 6–2	(United States) Patti Hogan	(Australia) Judy Dalton (United States) Julie Heldman	(Australia) Pat Edwards (South Africa) Brenda Kirk (Australia) Kerry Melville (Australia) Faye Moore	
26 Jul.	Western Championships; Cincinnati, United States; Clay; Singles - Doubles	(United States) (United States) Rosie Casals; 6–3, 6–3	(United States) Nancy Richey	(Australia) Helen Gourlay (France) Gail Chanfreau	(United States) Connie Capozzi (South Africa) Esmé Emmanuel (United States) Linda Tuero (South Africa) Pat Walkden	
26 Jul.	Budapest International Championships; Budapest, Hungary; Clay; Singles - Doubles	(Australia) Margaret Smith Court; 6–3, 6–2	(Czechoslovakia) Vlasta Vopičková	(Hungary) Katalin Borka (Hungary) Judit Szörényi	(Czechoslovakia) Miroslava Holubová (Poland) Barbara Kral (Hungary) Erzsébet Polgár (Hungary) Eva Szabo	
26 Jul.	Montana International Championships; Le Tennis Club Chermignon; Montana, Switzerland; Clay; Singles - Doubles	(Australia) Lesley Hunt; 7–5, 1–6, 6–2	(Japan) Kazuko Sawamatsu	(Chile) Ana María Arias (United States) Peggy Michel	(Ecuador) María Guzmán (Brazil) Suzana Petersen (Japan) Junko Sawamatsu (United States) Valerie Ziegenfuss	
27 Jul.	Danish Outdoor Championships; Kjøbenhavns Boldklub; Copenhagen, Denmark; Clay; Singles - Doubles	(Denmark) Inger Buchwald; 6–3, 6–2	(Denmark) Mari-Ann Bloch-Jørgensen	(Denmark) Pia Balling (Denmark) Gitte Ejlerskov		

=== August ===
Ended	Tournament	Winner	Finalist	Semi finalist	Quarter finalist
1 Aug.	La Coruña Internacional; La Coruña, Spain; Clay; Singles - Doubles	(Spain) Brigitte Schoene; 6–4, 6–2	(Spain) Carmen Renom		
1 Aug.	St. Moritz International; Der Tennisclub St. Moritz; St. Moritz, Switzerland; Clay; Singles - Doubles	(United Kingdom) Sally Holdsworth; 6–1, 11–9	(United Kingdom) Robin Lloyd		
1 Aug.	Quebec International; Victoria Tennis Club; Quebec City, Canada; Clay; Singles - Doubles	(Canada) Jane O'Hara; 6–2, 3–6, 6–2	(Canada) Andrée Martin	(Canada) Louise Brown (Canada) Susan Eager	
1 Aug.	Northumberland County Championships; Brandling LTC; Newcastle upon Tyne, Great Britain; Grass; Singles - Doubles	(United Kingdom) Corinne Molesworth; 6–3, 8–6	(United Kingdom) Marilyn Greenwood		
1 Aug.	Tunbridge Wells Open; Tunbridge Wells LTC; Newcastle upon Tyne, Great Britain; Grass; Singles - Doubles	(Republic of Ireland) Sue Minford; 6–3, 8–6	(United Kingdom) Shirley Stapleton		
1 Aug.	Hampshire Championships; Dean Park Cricket Ground; Bournemouth, Great Britain; Grass; Singles - Doubles	(United Kingdom) Diane Riste; 8–6, 6–1	(Australia) Barbara Walsh		
2 Aug.	U.S. Clay Court Championships; Indianapolis Racquet Club; Indianapolis, United States; Clay; Singles - Doubles	(United States) Linda Tuero; 7–5, 6–1	(France) Gail Chanfreau	(United States) Rosie Casals (United States) Nancy Richey	(United States) Mary Ann Curtis (South Africa) Esmé Emmanuel (Australia) Helen Gourlay (South Africa) Pat Walkden
2 Aug.	Dutch Open Championships; Hilversum, Netherlands; Clay; Singles - Doubles	(Australia) Margaret Court; 6–1, 6–1	(Australia) Kerry Melville	(West Germany) Helga Niessen (United States) Stephanie Johnson	(Australia) Evonne Goolagong (South Africa) Laura Rossouw (Netherlands) Marijke Schaar (United Kingdom) Virginia Wade
2 Aug.	East German Closed Outdoor Championships; Leipzig Sports Club; Leipzig, East Germany; Clay; Singles - Doubles	(East Germany) Helga Taterczynski; 6–1, 11–9	(East Germany) Brigitte Hoffmann	(East Germany) Bettina Borkert (East Germany) Veronika Koch	
8 Aug.	Penzance Open; Dean Park Cricket Ground; Bournemouth, Great Britain; Grass; Singles - Doubles	(United Kingdom) Diane Riste; 8–6, 6–1	(Australia) Barbara Walsh		
8 Aug.	Carmarthenshire Championships; Llanelly LTC; Llanelli, Great Britain; Grass; Singles - Doubles	(United Kingdom) Jackie Fayter; 9–7, 3–6, 6–4	(United Kingdom) Elizabeth Ernest		
8 Aug.	Bio-Strath West Warwickshire Open; West Warwickshire SC; Solihull, Great Britain; Grass; Singles - Doubles	(United Kingdom) Janice Townsend; 6–4, 3–6, 8–6	(United Kingdom) Marilyn Greenwood	(United Kingdom) Judy Congdon (United Kingdom) Sally Holdsworth	(United Kingdom) Rita Bentley (Ecuador) María Guzmán (Australia) Sandra Walsham (France) Jacqueline Venturino
8 Aug.	Framlingham Open; Framlingham College; Framlingham, Great Britain; Grass; Singles - Doubles	(United Kingdom) Shirley Brasher; 9–7, 3–6, 6–4	(United Kingdom) Elizabeth Ernest		
8 Aug.	Ilkley Open; Ilkley LTC; Ilkley, Great Britain; Grass; Singles - Doubles	(United Kingdom) Corinne Molesworth; 6–4, 6–4	(United States) Patti Hogan	(United Kingdom) Rita Bentley (India) Nirupama Mankad	(United Kingdom) Lindsey Beaven (Pakistan) Munawarah Iqbal (Republic of Ireland) Susan Minford (United Kingdom) Wendy Slaughter
9 Aug.	Torneo Internazionale di Senigallia; Senigallia, Italy; Clay; Singles - Doubles	(Australia) Lesley Hunt; 6–2, 6–1	(Uruguay) Fiorella Bonicelli	(Chile) Ana María Arias (Italy) Anna-Maria Nasuelli	(Romania) Mariana Ciogolea (Ecuador) María Guzmán (Italy) Daniela Porzio (Chile) Michelle Rodríguez
9 Aug.	U.S. National Amateur Clay Court Championships; Rochester, United States; Clay; Singles - Doubles	(United States) Linda Tuero; 7–5, 6–1	(United States) Laura duPont	(United States) Marjorie Gengler (United States) Pam Richmond	(United States) Sherry Bedingfield (United States) Connie Capozzi (United States) Ann Lebedeff (United States) Mary Struthers
10 Aug.	Corfu Open International; Corfu City, Greece; Clay; Singles - Doubles	(Greece) Carol-Ann Kalogeropoulos; 6–1, 6–1	(United Kingdom) Vivian Grisogno	(Spain) Maria José Aubet (Spain) Alex Rota	
10 Aug.	European Amateur Championships; Sofia, Bulgaria; Clay; Singles - Doubles	(Soviet Union) Olga Morozova; 6–1, 11–9	(Hungary) Katalin Borka	(Hungary) Erzsébet Polgár (Soviet Union) Yevgenia Izopaitis	(Bulgaria) Yuliya Berberyan (Czechoslovakia) Dominika Ciakirová (Poland) Barbara Krall (Czechoslovakia) Marie Neumanová
11 Aug.	Tournoi International d'Ostende; Ostend, Belgium; Clay; Singles - Doubles	(France) Marion Proisy; 6–4, 6–1	(Australia) Helen Amos	(Belgium) Ingrid Loeys (Brazil) Suzana Petersen	
12 Aug.	Bavarian Open International Championships; Munich, West Germany; Clay; Singles - Doubles	(Australia) Evonne Goolagong; 6–2, 6–1	(Australia) Karen Krantzcke	(West Germany) Helga Niessen (West Germany) Helga Hösl	(Australia) Kerry Melville (West Germany) Heide Orth (South Africa) Brenda Kirk (South Africa) Laura Rossouw
14 Aug.	La Baule-les-Pins Gold Cup; La Baule-les-Pins, France; Clay; Singles - Doubles	(France) Florence Guédy; 6–3, 6–2	(Chile) Michelle Rodríguez	(Argentina) Beatriz Araujo (Spain) Carmen Mandarino	
15 Aug.	Wiltshire Championships; Swindon, Great Britain; Grass; Singles - Doubles	(United Kingdom) Jenny Chamberlain; 6–3, 6–2	(United Kingdom) B Chamberlain		
15 Aug.	Norfolk Championships; Cromer, Great Britain; Grass; Singles - Doubles	(United Kingdom) Jenny Chamberlain; 6–2, 6–3	(United Kingdom) H.B. Chamberlain		
15 Aug.	Cranleigh Open; Cranleigh, Great Britain; Grass; Singles - Doubles	(United States) Patti Hogan; 6–4, 7–5	(United Kingdom) Shirley Bloomer Brasher		
15 Aug.	Sussex Championships; West Worthing, Great Britain; Grass; Singles - Doubles	(United Kingdom) Jenny Chamberlain; 6–2, 6–3	(United Kingdom) H.B. Chamberlain		
16 Aug.	USSR International Championships; Moscow, Soviet Union; Hard; Singles - Doubles	(Soviet Union) Olga Morozova; 6–4, 6–4	(Soviet Union) Tiiu Parmas	(Soviet Union) Rauza Islanova (Soviet Union) Eugenia Isopaitis	(Soviet Union) Marina Kroschina (Soviet Union) Maria Kull (Czechoslovakia) Marie Neumanová (Soviet Union) Nadia Tukhareti
16 Aug.	Netherlands National Championships; Scheveningen, Netherlands; Clay; Singles - Doubles	(Netherlands) Betty Stöve; 1–6, 6–2, 6–2	(Netherlands) Marijke Schaar	(Netherlands) Judith Salome (Netherlands) Tine Zwaan	(Netherlands) Ada Bakker (Netherlands) Nora Blom (Netherlands) Jenny Ridderhof (Netherlands) Trudy Groenman
17 Aug.	Tournoi d'août du Touquet; Le Touquet, France; Clay; Singles - Doubles	(Mexico) Elena Subirats; 6–3, 6–2	(France) Marion Proisy	(Japan) Kayoko Fukuoka (France) Christiane Spinoza	
17 Aug.	German Open Championships; Hamburg, West Germany; Clay; Singles - Doubles	(West Germany) Helga Schultze; 6–3, 6–3	(West Germany) Helga Niessen	(Australia) Evonne Goolagong (Australia) Kerry Melville	(Australia) Judy Dalton (Australia) Faye Moore (South Africa) Annette Du Plooy (South Africa) Laura Rossouw
17 Aug.	Knokke-Le-Zoute International; Knokke, Belgium; Clay; Singles - Doubles	(Belgium) Monique Van Haver; 6–4, 6–4	(Chile) Ana María Arias	(Chile) Michelle Rodríguez (Belgium) Luciette Sliepen	
18 Aug.	Rothmans Canadian Open; Toronto, Canada; Clay; Singles - Doubles	(Australia) Margaret Court; 6–8, 6–4, 6–4	(United States) Rosemary Casals	(South Africa) Esmé Emmanuel (Canada) Linda Tuero	(Canada) Susan Eager (Australia) Helen Gourlay (United States) Ceci Martinez (South Africa) Pat Walkden
22 Aug.	The Avenue Open Tournament; Havant, Great Britain; Grass; Singles - Doubles	(United Kingdom) Rachael Steadman; 6–2, 6–3	(United Kingdom) Mrs. R. Collings		
22 Aug.	Winchester Open; Winchester, Great Britain; Grass; Singles - Doubles	(United Kingdom) Marilyn Greenwood; 6–2, 6–3	(United Kingdom) Di Riste		
22 Aug.	ATA National Championships(54th ed.); St. Louis, United States; Hard; Singles - Doubles	(United States) Bonnie Logan; 6–4, 6–3	(United States) Bessie Stockard	(United States) Beverly Hassel (United States) Ann Koger	(United States) Mary Beauchamp (United States) Brenda Johnson (United States) Delores McGill (United States) Brenda Reuter
22 Aug.	Robertson Viota Exmouth Open; Exmouth, Great Britain; Grass; Singles - Doubles	(United Kingdom) Rita Bentley; 6–2, 6–3	(United Kingdom) Nuala Dwyer		
23 Aug.	Pennsylvania Grass Court Open Championships; Haverford, United States; Grass; Singles - Doubles	(Australia) Margaret Court; 6–1, 6–0	(South Africa) Pat Walkden	(Australia) Kerry Melville (United Kingdom) Corinne Molesworth	(United States) Peaches Bartkowicz (France) Gail Chanfreau (United States) Mary Ann Curtis (France) Francoise Durr
23 Aug.	U.S. National Public Parks Championships; Detroit, United States; Hard; Singles - Doubles	(United States) Joan Johnson; 6–8, 6–3, 7–5	(United States) Sue Pritula	(United States) Marjorie Gengler (United States) Mary Arnold Prentiss	(United States) Carol Levy (United States) Marilyn Mueller (United States) Lydia Wieberg (United States) Lenny Yee
24 Aug.	Austrian International Championships; Kitzbühel, Austria; Clay; Singles - Doubles	(West Germany) Helga Niessen; 7–5, 6–3	(Australia) Evonne Goolagong	(South Africa) Annette Du Plooy (United Kingdom) Winnie Shaw	(South Africa) Laura Rossouw (West Germany) Kora Schediwy
29 Aug	Budleigh Salterton Open; Budleigh Salterton, Great Britain; Grass; Singles - Doubles	(United Kingdom) Rita Bentley; 6–1, 6–1	(United Kingdom) Jackie Fayter	(Republic of Ireland) Susan Minford (United Kingdom) Penny Moor	(United Kingdom) Judy Congdon (United Kingdom) Nuala Dwyer (United Kingdom) Jennie Heliar (Australia) Barbara Walsh
30 Aug.	German Closed National Championships; Braunschweig, West Germany; Clay; Singles - Doubles	(West Germany) Helga Hösl; 6–3, 2–6, 6–2	(West Germany) Helga Niessen	(West Germany) Katja Ebbinghaus (West Germany) Heide Schildknecht	(West Germany) Gabriele Lutteken (West Germany) Kora Schediwy (West Germany) Almut Sturm (West Germany) Edith Winkens
30 Aug.	Tyrolean Championships; Innsbruck, Austria; Clay; Singles - Doubles	(Australia) Evonne Goolagong; 7–5, 6–0	(Austria) Sonja Pachta		
30 Aug.	Sydney Metropolitan Hard Court Championships; Sydney, Australia; Clay; Singles - Doubles	(Australia) Pat Coleman; 6–3, 7–6	(Australia) Ann Coleman		
31 Aug.	Marlborough Open Championships; South Orange, United States; Grass; Singles - Doubles	(Australia) Kerry Melville; 7–6, 6–4	(United States) Patti Hogan	(Australia) Margaret Court (Australia) Judy Dalton	(United States) Rosie Casals (Australia) Helen Gourlay (Australia) Lesley Hunt (Soviet Union) Olga Morozova
31 Aug.	Istanbul International Championships; Istanbul, Turkey; Clay; Singles - Doubles	(United Kingdom) Ann Haydon Jones; 6–4, 6–1	(United Kingdom) Winnie Shaw	(United Kingdom) Jill Cooper (Australia) Fay Moore	(Soviet Union) Anna Dmitrieva (New Zealand) Robyn Legge (Brazil) Suzana Petersen (New Zealand) Marilyn Pryde

=== September ===
Ended	Tournament	Winner	Finalist	Semi finalist	Quarter finalist
1 Sep	Czechoslovakian Closed Championships; Ostrava, Czechoslovakia; Clay; Singles - Doubles	(Czechoslovakia) Miroslava Holubová; 4–6, 6–3, 6–4	(Czechoslovakia) Vlasta Vopičková	(Czechoslovakia) Olga Lendlová (Czechoslovakia) Renáta Tomanová	
1 Sep	Los Gotos Open; Los Gatos, United States; Hard; Singles - Doubles	(United States) Kate Latham; 6–4, 6–3	(United States) Marlene Muench	(United States) Susan Anawalt (United States) Jeanne Olsen	
1 Sep	Polish International Championships; Warsaw, Poland; Clay; Singles - Doubles	(France) Odile de Roubin; 7–5, 4–6, 6–4	(Romania) Judith Dibar		
1 Sep	Swedish Closed Championships; Stockholm, Sweden; Clay; Singles - Doubles	(Sweden) Christina Sandberg; 1–6, 9–7, 6–1	(Sweden) Ingrid Bentzer	(Sweden) Eva Lundquist (Sweden) Margareta Strandberg	
1 Sep	Saloniki International; Thessaloniki, Greece; Clay; Singles - Doubles	(France) Odile de Roubin; 6–2, 6–3	(Greece) Dion Asteri		
1 Sep	U.S. Amateur Grass Court Championships; Greenville, United States; Grass; Singles - Doubles	(United States) Eliza Pande; 3–6, 9–7, 6–2	(United States) Sharon Walsh	(United States) Janice Metcalf (United States) Janet Newberry	(United States) Gail Hansen (United States) Jane Kincaid (United States) Patti Ann Reese (United States) Laurie Tenney
6 Sep.	Greek International Championships; Athens, Greece; Clay; Singles - Doubles	(Uruguay) Fiorella Bonicelli; 3–6, 6–4, 6–4	(South Africa) Laura Rossouw	(Italy) Monica Giorgi (Italy) Anna-Maria Nasuelli	(Greece) Dion Asteri (Spain) Maria-Jose Aubet (West Germany) Ilse Buding (Greece) Carol-Ann Kalogeropoulos
6 Sep.	Brummana International; Brummana, Lebanon; Clay; Singles - Doubles	(United Kingdom) Winnie Shaw; 1–6, 6–2, 6–1	(United Kingdom) Ann Haydon Jones	(United Kingdom) Jill Cooper (Australia) Faye Moore	(Chile) Ana María Arias (Czechoslovakia) Alena Palmeová
6 Sep.	World Student Games; Turin, Italy; Clay	(Soviet Union) Tiiu Parmas; Gold; 6–8, 8–6, 6–1	(Japan) Kazuko Sawamatsu; Silver	(France) Odile de Roubin; Bronze (Netherlands) Ada Bakker; 4th	(Italy) Monica Giorgi (United States) Pixie Lamm (Mexico) Elena Subirats (Australia) Janet Young
7 Sep.	Labor Day Invitation; Miami Beach, United States; Hard; Singles - Doubles	(United States) Donna Ganz; 6–8, 8–6, 6–1	(Cuba) Pilar Herrero	(United States) Rayni Fox (United States) Bunny Smith	(United States) Jodi Applebaum (Venezuela) Veronica Mandel (Mexico) Rosie Reyes
13 Sep.	Heart of America Championships; Kansas City, United States; Clay; Singles - Doubles	(United States) Val Ziegenfuss; 6–0, 6–2	(United Kingdom) Corinne Molesworth	(United States) Mary Ann Curtis (United Kingdom) Sally Holdsworth	(South Africa) Esmé Emmanuel (United States) Betty-Ann Hansen (United States) Ceci Martinez (France) Christiane Spinoza
13 Sep.	Pensacola Invitational; Pensacola, United States; Clay; Singles - Doubles	(Australia) Lesley Hunt; 6–2, 7–5	(South Africa) Pat Walkden	(Australia) Helen Gourlay (United States) Stephanie Johnson	(United States) Ann Dunbar (United States) Anne McClellan (United States) Toni Novack (United States) Bunny Smith
13 Sep.	U.S. Open; Forest Hills, United States; Grass; Singles - Doubles	(Australia) Margaret Court; 6–2, 2 6, 6–1	(United States) Rosie Casals	(United States) Nancy Richey (United Kingdom) Virginia Wade	(France) Françoise Dürr (Australia) Helen Gourlay (Australia) Lesley Hunt (Australia) Kerry Melville
13 Sep.	U.S. Open; Forest Hills, United States; Grass; Singles - Doubles	(Australia) Margaret Court (Australia) Judy Dalton; 6–3, 6–4	(United States) Rosie Casals (United Kingdom) Virginia Wade	(United States) Nancy Richey (United Kingdom) Virginia Wade	(France) Françoise Dürr (Australia) Helen Gourlay (Australia) Lesley Hunt (Australia) Kerry Melville
15 Sep.	Virginia Slims Invitation; Houston, United States; Hard; Singles - Doubles	(United States) Rosemary Casals; 5–7, 6–1, 7–5	(Australia) Judy Dalton	(Australia) Kerry Melville (United States) Nancy Richey	(United States) Peaches Bartkowicz (United States) Billie Jean King (United States) Kristy Pigeon (United States) Valerie Ziegenfuss
15 Sep.	Malaysian International Championships; Kuala Lumpur, Malaysia; Clay; Singles - Doubles	(Singapore) Philippa Miall; 4–6, 6–2, 7–5	(Thailand) Somsri Chotichuti	(New Zealand) Ruth Green (Malaysia) Radhika Menon	
19 Sep.	Coupe Bonfiglio; Milan, Italy; Clay; Singles - Doubles	(Uruguay) Fiorella Bonicelli; 6–4, 8–6	(Netherlands) Judith Salomé		
20 Sep.	Rhodesian International Championships; Salisbury, Rhodesia; Grass; Singles - Doubles	(South Africa) Sheila Piercey Summers; 6–1, 9–7	(Rhodesia) Fiona Morris		
20 Sep.	International Championships of San Sebastian; San Sebastián, Spain; Clay; Singles - Doubles	(Brazil) Suzana Petersen; 6–4, 6–4	(Australia) Sandra Walsham	(Spain) Maria-Jose Aubet (Romania) Judith Dibar	
20 Sep.	Yugoslavia International Championships; Belgrade, Yugoslavia; Clay; Singles - Doubles	(West Germany) Kora Schediwy; 6–3, 6–3	(Czechoslovakia) Olga Lendlová	(Switzerland) Anne Marie Studer (Switzerland) Marianne Kindler	(Czechoslovakia) Miroslava Bendlová (Czechoslovakia) Renáta Tomanová (Australia) Barbara Walsh
20 Sep.	Carolinas Autumn Invitation; Charlotte, United States; Clay; Singles - Doubles	(United States) Nancy Richey; 6–4, 6–1	(United States) Chris Evert	(Australia) Margaret Court (United Kingdom) Virginia Wade	(France) Francoise Durr (United States) Laurie Fleming
20 Sep.	Santa Clara County Tennis Championships (55th ed); San Jose, United States; Hard; Singles - Doubles	(United States) Ann Kiyomura; 6–1, 6–1	(United States) Pat Welles	(United States) Andrea Barnes (United States) Judy Louie	
20 Sep.	Coupe Marcel Poree; Paris, France; Clay; Singles - Doubles	(France) Odile de Roubin; 3–6, 6–2, 6–1	(France) Danièle Bouteleux	(Chile) Ana María Arias (France) Anne-Marie Cassaigne	(Mexico) Rosie Darmon (United States) Pixie Lamm (Chile) Michelle Rodríguez (France) Sylvie Pruvot-Rual
25 Sep.	Croatia International; Opatija, Yugoslavia; Clay; Singles - Doubles	(Austria) Sonja Pachta; 6–4, 6–4	(West Germany) Kora Schediwy	(Switzerland) Anne Marie Studer (Czechoslovakia) Olga Lendlová	(Switzerland) Rita Felix (Socialist Federal Republic of Yugoslavia) Irena Škulj (Australia) Barbara Walsh (Australia) Sandra Walsham
27 Sep	Midland Invitation; Midland, United States; Hard; Singles - Doubles	(United States) Connie Capozzi; 6–3, 7–5	(United States) Janice Mouldin	(United States) Janna Hooton (United States) Darlene Rose	
27 Sep	Pacific South-West Open Championships; Los Angeles, United States; Hard; Singles - Doubles	(United States) Sharon Walsh; 6–1, 6–1	(Australia) Lesley Hunt	(United States) Ceci Martinez (South Africa) Pat Walkden	(South Africa) Esmé Emmanuel (Australia) Helen Gourlay (United States) Linda Lewis (United States) Janet Newberry

=== October ===
Ended	Tournament	Winner	Finalist	Semi finalist	Quarter finalist
1 Oct.	Auckland Catholic Open; Auckland, New Zealand; Grass; Singles - Doubles	(New Zealand) Beverly Vercoe; 6–4, 7–5	(New Zealand) Jill Fraser	(New Zealand) Julie Chatfield (New Zealand) Lynette Ward	(New Zealand) Margeret Bond (New Zealand) M. Lye (New Zealand) Barbara Simpson (New Zealand) Tup Singer
1 Oct.	Italian National Championships; Bologna, Italy; Clay; Singles - Doubles	(Italy) Lea Pericoli; 0–6, 6–3, 6–2	(Italy) Maria Nasuelli	(Italy) Monica Giorgi (Italy) Daniela Porzio	(Italy) Miss Albini (Italy) Lucia Bassi (Italy) Maria Monami (Italy) Graziella Perna
1 Oct.	Romanian National Championships; Bucharest, Romania; Clay; Singles - Doubles	(Romania) Agneta Kun; 6–2, 6–0	(Romania) Judith Dibar	(Romania) Valria Balaj (Romania) Eleonora Dumitrescu	
3 Oct.	Eastern Suburbs Open; Coogee, Australia; Grass; Singles - Doubles	(Australia) Evonne Goolagong; 6–2, 6–0	(Australia) Anne Coleman	(Australia) Sue Hole (Australia) L. Smith	
4 Oct.	Pacific Coast International Open; Los Gatos, United States; Hard; Singles - Doubles	(United States) Nancy Richey; 7–6, 6–4	(United States) Rosie Casals	(United States) Billie Jean King (United States) Sharon Walsh	(Australia) Judy Dalton (Australia) Helen Gourlay (Australia) Lesley Hunt (South Africa) Pat Walkden
4 Oct.	Romanian International Championships; Bucharest, Romania; Clay; Singles - Doubles	(Romania) Judith Dibar; 6–2, 6–1	(Hungary) Eva Szabo	(Australia) Sue Alexander (West Germany) Veronica Koch	
5 Oct.	Pan Am Open; Auckland, New Zealand; Grass; Singles - Doubles	(New Zealand) Jill Fraser; 0–6, 6–3, 6–3	(New Zealand) Beverly Vercoe		
11 Oct.	French National Championships (tennis); Bordeaux, France; Clay; Singles - Doubles	(France) Gail Chanfreau; 9–7, 6–2	(France) Françoise Dürr	(France) Odile de Roubin (France) Rosie Darmon	(France) Danièle Bouteleux (France) Anne Marie Cassaigne (France) Nathalie Fuchs (France) Evelyne Terras
11 Oct.	USSR National Championships; Alma Ata, Soviet Union; Hard; Singles - Doubles	(Soviet Union) Olga Morozova; 6–4, 6–3	(Soviet Union) Zaiga Yansone	(Soviet Union) Yevgenia Izopaitis (Soviet Union) Anna Yeremeyev	(Soviet Union) Aleksandra Ivanova (Soviet Union) Lilia Karpova (Soviet Union) Tiiu Kivi (Soviet Union) Maria Kull
11 Oct.	Spanish National Championships; Madrid, Spain; Clay; Singles - Doubles	(Spain) Carmen Coronado; 6–2, 6–0	(Spain) Ana María Estalella		
11 Oct.	Cocoa Beach Invitation; Cocoa Beach, United States; Clay; Singles - Doubles	(United States) Kathy Kuykendall; 7–5, 7–5	(United States) Bunny Smith	(United States) Elaine Brackett (United States) Pat Miller	(United States) Martha Crosskeys (United States) Barbara Hlinka
17 Oct.	Dewar Cup Edinburgh; Edinburgh, Great Britain; NyGrass (i); Singles - Doubles	(United States) Sharon Walsh; 6–2, 8–6	(United Kingdom) Winnie Shaw	(United Kingdom) Ann Haydon Jones (United Kingdom) Virginia Wade	(United Kingdom) Lesley Charles (United Kingdom) Jackie Fayter (United Kingdom) Corinne Molesworth (United Kingdom) Nell Truman
18 Oct.	Victorian Hard Court Championships; Melbourne, Australia; Clay; Singles - Doubles	(Australia) Lorraine Coghlan Robinson; 6–4, 6–2	(Australia) Kerry Wilkinson		
18 Oct.	Fairfield Open Hard Courts; Fairfield, Australia; Clay; Singles - Doubles	(Australia) Carol Zeeman; 8–6, 6–1	(Australia) Jill Emmerson		
23 Oct.	Sydney Metropolitan Grasscourt Championships (including Strathfield Open); Strathfield, Australia; Grass; Singles - Doubles	(Australia) Evonne Goolagong; 6–3, 6–3	(Australia) Pat Coleman		
23 Oct.	Bowring Institute Championships; Bangalore, India; Clay; Singles - Doubles	(India) Udaya Kumar; 2–6, 6–1, 6–4	(India) Kiran Peshawaria	(India) Susan Das (India) Cherri Chettyanna	
24 Oct.	Dewar Cup Stalybridge; Stalybridge, Great Britain; Uni-Turf (i); Singles - Doubles	(United Kingdom) Virginia Wade; 2–6, 6–2, 6–1	(United Kingdom) Ann Haydon Jones	(France) Francoise Durr (United States) Patti Hogan	(United Kingdom) Winnie Shaw (Netherlands) Betty Stöve (United States) Sharon Walsh (United Kingdom) Joyce Williams
25 Oct.	Spanish Open Championships; Barcelona, Spain; Clay; Singles - Doubles	(West Germany) Helga Hosl; 6–1, 6–1	(Australia) Sue Alexander	(Spain) Ana María Estalella (Australia) Sandra Walsham	
25 Oct.	Israel Invitation; Beersheba, Israel; Clay; Singles - Doubles	(Israel) Tova Epstein; 6–4, 6–0	(Israel) Tamar Sendik		
25 Oct.	Florida Closed Championships(12th); Delray Beach, United States; Clay; Singles - Doubles	(United States) Chris Evert; 6–3, 6–0	(United States) Laurie Fleming	(United States) Donna Ganz (United States) Susan Vinton	
31 Oct.	Dewar Cup Aberavon; Aberavon, Great Britain; NyGrass Carpet (i); Singles - Doubles	(United Kingdom) Virginia Wade; 6–2, 8–6	(United Kingdom) Ann Haydon Jones	(United Kingdom) Winnie Shaw (United States) Sharon Walsh	(France) Francoise Durr (Netherlands) Betty Stöve (United Kingdom) Nell Truman (United Kingdom) Joyce Williams

=== November ===
Ended	Tournament	Winner	Finalist	Semi finalist	Quarter finalist
1 Nov.	Osorio Cup (South America Tennis Confederation) (team event); São Paulo, Brazil; Clay	Chile	Colombia	Argentina; Ecuador	Brazil; Peru; Uruguay
1 Nov.	Queensland Hard Court Championships; Brisbane, Australia; Hard; Singles - Doubles	(Australia) Evonne Goolagong; 6–3, 3–6, 6–4	(United States) Patty Ann Reese		
1 Nov.	Zaragoza International; Zaragoza, Spain; Clay; Singles - Doubles	(Australia) Sandra Walsham; 0–6, 6–3, 6–2	(Chile) Michelle Rodriguez	(Spain) Ana María Estalella Manso (South Africa) Joan Koudelka	(Spain) Maria Teresa Cuadrado (Sweden) Ebba Leijonhufvud (Belgium) Monique Van Haver
1 Nov.	Wellington Championships; Wellington, New Zealand; Clay; Singles - Doubles	(New Zealand) Marilyn Pryde; 6–2, 6–2	(New Zealand) Catherine Mclauchlan	(New Zealand) Barbara McNeilly (New Zealand) S. Meachen	
1 Nov.	San Diego Metropolitan Tennis Championships; San Diego, United States; Hard; Singles - Doubles	(United States) Marita Redondo; 6–3, 6–4	(United States) Laurie Tenney	(United States) Vicki Jensen (United States) Mary Struthers	(United States) Pam Farmer (United States) Vicki Smouse (United States) Leanne Strode (United States) Cindy Ursich
1 Nov.	Auckland Hard Court Championships; Auckland, New Zealand; Clay; Singles - Doubles	(New Zealand) Beverly Vercoe; 6–2, 6–2	(New Zealand) Jill Fraser	(New Zealand) Barbara Simpson (New Zealand) Beverly Ward	(New Zealand) Joan Buckpitt (New Zealand) Christine Fletcher (New Zealand) Yvonne Harrison (New Zealand) Patricia Hern
6 Nov.	Bermuda Invitation; Hamilton, Bermuda; Clay; Singles - Doubles	(Bermuda) Ann Alger; 7–5, 7–5	(United States) Grace Findlay		
7 Nov.	Dewar Cup Torquay; Torquay, Great Britain; NyGrass Carpet (i); Singles - Doubles	(United Kingdom) Ann Haydon Jones; 6–7, 7–5	(United Kingdom) Virginia Wade	(France) Francoise Durr (United Kingdom) Winnie Shaw	(Netherlands) Betty Stöve (United Kingdom) Janice Townsend (United States) Sharon Walsh (United Kingdom) Joyce Williams
8 Nov.	Virginia Slims Invitational; Richmond, United States; Hard; Singles - Doubles	(United States) Billie Jean King; 6–3, 6–3	(United States) Nancy Richey	(United States) Rosie Casals (United States) Mary Ann Curtis	(United States) Darlene Hard (United States) Ceci Martinez (United States) Kristy Pigeon (United States) Valerie Ziegenfuss
8 Nov.	Australian Hard Court Championships; Toowoomba, Australia; Clay; Singles - Doubles	(Australia) Evonne Goolagong; 6–3, 6–2	(Australia) Margaret Tesch	(Australia) Patricia Coleman (United States) Kris Kemmer	(Australia) Brenda Dale (Australia) Ann Coleman (United States) Nancy Ornstein (Australia) Wendy Turnbull
8 Nov.	Citrus Bowl Invitation; Vero Beach, United States; Clay; Singles - Doubles	(United States) Chris Evert; 6–1, 6–1	(United States) Judy Alvarez	(United States) Toni Kramer (United States) Bunny Smith	
8 Nov.	Phoenix Thunderbird Open; Phoenix Country Club; Phoenix, United States; Hard; Singles - Doubles	(Canada) Vicki Berner; 6–3, 6–2	(United States) Stephanie Tolleson		
8 Nov.	South American Open Championships; Buenos Aires, Argentina; Clay; Singles - Doubles	(Argentina) Beatriz Araujo; 6–4, 6–4	(Argentina) Raquel Giscafré	(Chile) Ana María Arias (Argentina) Ines Roget	(Spain) Carmen Mandarino (Argentina) Graciela Morán (Argentina) Marta Fernandez Ruiz (United States) Alice Tym
8 Nov.	Coral Beach Invitation; Warwick, Bermuda; Hard; Singles - Doubles	(United States) Sally Fuller; 6–2, 6–1	(United States) Kay Hubbell		
8 Nov.	Japan International Championships; Osaka, Japan; Hard; Singles - Doubles	(Japan) Kazuko Sawamatsu; 6–3, 7–5	(United States) Kathy Harter	(Japan) Kimiyo Hatanaka (Sweden) Eva Lundqvist	(Japan) Mieko Enouchi (Japan) Kazuko Kuromatsu (South Korea) Yang Jeong-soon (Japan) Yaeko Matsuda
14 Nov.	Naples on the Gulf Tournament; Naples, United States; Clay; Singles - Doubles	(United States) Susan Vinton; 6–3, 8–6	(United States) JoAnne Russell		
14 Nov.	Dewar Cup Finals; London, Great Britain; Carpet (i); Singles - Doubles	(France) Francoise Durr; 7–6, (6-4) 2–6, 6–2	(United Kingdom) Ann Haydon Jones	(United Kingdom) Winnie Shaw (United Kingdom) Virginia Wade	(United States) Patti Hogan (Netherlands) Betty Stöve (United States) Sharon Walsh (United Kingdom) Joyce Williams
15 Nov.	Chilean National Championships; Santiago, Chile; Clay; Singles - Doubles	(Chile) Michelle Rodriguez; 6–3, 6–0	(Chile) Carmen Mandarino	(Chile) Carmen Fernandez (Chile) Leyla Musalem	(Chile) Ana Cornejo (Chile) Marcela Galleguillos (Chile) Maria Ibarra (Chile) Patricia Rivera
15 Nov.	Queensland Championships; Brisbane, Australia; Grass; Singles - Doubles	(Australia) Evonne Goolagong; 6–3, 6–2	(United States) Kristien Kemmer	(United States) Nancy Ornstein (United States) Patty Ann Reese	(Australia) Patricia Coleman (Australia) Janet Fallis (Australia) Margaret Tesch (Australia) Janine Whyte
15 Nov.	March of Dimes Fall Open; San Diego, United States; Hard; Singles - Doubles	(United States) Janet Newberry; 8–6, 6–1	(United States) Marita Redondo	(United States) Vicki Jensen (United States) Chris Mattson	(United States) Sue Boyle (United States) Susan Hagey (United States) Terry Holladay (United States) Terri Thomas
21 Nov.	Embassy British Indoor Championships; London, Great Britain; Carpet (i); Singles - Doubles	(United States) Billie Jean King; 8–6, 3–6, 6–1	(United Kingdom) Ann Haydon Jones	(France) Françoise Dürr (United Kingdom) Virginia Wade	(United Kingdom) Corinne Molesworth (United States) Sharon Walsh (United Kingdom) Joyce Williams (United States) Val Ziegenfuss
21 Nov.	Southern Transvaal Championships; Johannesburg, South Africa; Hard; Singles - Doubles	(South Africa) Brenda Kirk; 6–4, 6–2	(South Africa) Ilana Kloss	(South Africa) Pam Diepraam (South Africa) Marianna Brummer	
29 Nov.	South Queensland Open Championships; Ipswich, Australia; Grass; Singles - Doubles	(Australia) Janet Fallis; 6–3, 3–6, 6–4	(Australia) Wendy Turnbull		
29 Nov.	La Paz International; La Paz, Bolivia; Grass; Singles - Doubles	(United States) Alice Tym; 3–6, 6–2, 6–1	(Bolivia) Carlotta Velasco	(Spain) Carmen Mandarino (Chile) Michelle Boulle-Rodríguez	(Venezuela) Maria Andrea Cardenas (United States) Beatrice Christman
29 Nov.	Towpath Racquet Club Invitation; Akron, United States; Hard (i); Singles - Doubles	(United States) Andrea Larson; 9–7, 4–6, 6–2	(United States) Marnie Seifred		
29 Nov.	Fort Worth Thanksgiving Tournament; Fort Worth, United States; Hard; Singles - Doubles	(United States) Connie Capozzi; 6–3, 6–3	(United States) Janice Mauldin		
29 Nov.	Sarasota Invitation; Sarasota, United States; Clay; Singles - Doubles	(United States) Elaine Brackett; 6–3, 6–3	(United States) Linda Hall		
29 Nov.	Sheraton Beach Championships; Miami Beach, United States; Hard; Singles - Doubles	(United States) Pilar Herrero; 6–4, 6–3	(United States) Bunny Smith	(United States) Ariene Karasik (United States) Nancy Kirsten	
29 Nov.	Scottish Covered Courts Championships; Glasgow, Great Britain; Hard (i); Singles - Doubles	(United Kingdom) Winnie Shaw; 6–2, 6–3	(United Kingdom) Lindsey Beaven	(United Kingdom) Marilyn Greenwood (United Kingdom) Margery Love	

=== December ===
Ended	Tournament	Winner	Finalist	Semi finalist	Quarter finalist
5 Dec.	Cochabamba International; Cochabamba, Bolivia; Clay; Singles - Doubles	(Chile) Michelle Boulle-Rodríguez; 6–3, 6–0	(United States) Beatrice Christman	(Chile) Carmen Ibarra (Bolivia) Carlota Velasco	
6 Dec.	Coupe Albert Canet; Paris, France; Wood (i); Singles - Doubles	(France) Janine Lieffrig; 2–6, 7–5, 6–0	(France) Danièle Bouteleux	(France) Jacqueline Berson (France) Nathalie Fuchs	
13 Dec.	Salvador Deik Memorial Invitation; Santiago, Chile; Clay; Singles - Doubles	(Chile) Carmen Fernandez; 6–3, 6–0	(Chile) Leyla Musalem	(Chile) Patricia Rivera (Chile) Marisol Silva	
13 Dec.	Colombo Championships; Colombo, Sri Lanka; Clay; Singles - Doubles	(Dominion of Ceylon) Oosha Chanmugam; 6–4, 6–3	(Dominion of Ceylon) Srima Abeyegunawardena	(Dominion of Ceylon) Susima Abeyegunawardene (Dominion of Ceylon) Mala Fernando	
17 Dec.	Hawaii Vass Championships; Honolulu, United States; Hard; Singles - Doubles	(United States) Muriel Osborne; 9–7, 4–6, 6–2	(United States) Doris Hakman		
19 Dec.	Orange Free State Championships; Bloemfontein, South Africa; Hard; Singles - Doubles	(United States) Ceci Martinez; 8–6, 6–3	(United States) Tory Ann Fretz	(Australia) Helen Amos (South Africa) K Truter	(South Africa) Ilana Kloss (South Africa) S Mclachlan (South Africa) Glenda Swan (United Kingdom) Elizabeth Truter
26 Dec.	South Australian Championships; Adelaide, Australia; Grass; Singles - Doubles	(Soviet Union) Olga Morozova; 6–4, 4–6, 9–7	(United States) Kristien Kemmer	(United States) Kerry Harris (Japan) Kazuko Sawamatsu	(Australia) Dianne Berkinshaw (Japan) Kimiyo Hatanaka (United States) Patti Hogan (United States) Patty Ann Reese
26 Dec.	Border Championships; East London, South Africa; Hard; Singles - Doubles	(United States) Ceci Martinez; 8–6, 6–3	(United States) Tory Ann Fretz	(South Africa) Greta Delport (South Africa) Alison McMillan	(Australia) Helen Amos (South Africa) Daphne Botha (South Africa) Lynn Montgomery (South Africa) Rowena Whitehouse

== World rankings ==
These are the Top 10 World Rankings for 1970 by tennis journalists, magazines and authors. WTA Rankings did not begin until 1974/75.

Lance Tingay	Joseph McCauley	Bud Collins	Rino Tommasi	Rex Bellamy	Judith Elian (L'Equipe)	Mike Gibson	World Tennis Magazine (Germany)
1. M. Smith Court; 2. B. J. King; 3. R. Casals; 4. H. Niessen Masthoff; 5. V. Wade; 6. A. Haydon Jones; 7. K. Melville; 8. K. Krantzcke; 9. J. Heldman; 10. F. Dürr	1. M. Smith Court; 2. B. J. King; 3. R. Casals; 4. V. Wade; 5. H. Niessen Masthoff; 6. K. Melville; 7. J. Heldman; 8. K. Krantzcke; 9. F. Dürr; 10. N. Richey	1. M. Smith Court; 2. B. J. King; 3. R. Casals; 4. N. Richey; 5. V. Wade; 6. H. Niessen Masthoff; 7. A. Haydon Jones; 8. K. Melville; 9. K. Krantzcke; 10. F. Dürr	1. M. Smith Court; 2. B. J. King; 3. R. Casals; 4. V. Wade; 5. H. Niessen Masthoff; 6. K. Melville; 7. A. Haydon Jones; 8. F. Dürr; 9. K. Krantzcke; 10. E. Goolagong	1. M. Smith Court; 2. B. J. King; 3. R. Casals; 4. H. Niessen Masthoff; 5. V. Wade; 6. A. Haydon Jones; 7. K. Melville; 8. F. Dürr; 9. J. Heldman; 10. E. Goolagong	1. M. Smith Court; 2. B. J. King; 3. R. Casals; 4. H. Niessen Masthoff; 5. V. Wade; 6. K. Melville; 7. K. Krantzcke; 8. F. Dürr; 9. J. Heldman; 10. N. Richey	1. M. Smith Court; 2. B. J. King; 3. A. Haydon Jones; 4. R. Casals; 5. H. Niessen Masthoff; 6. V. Wade; 7. K. Melville; 8. K. Krantzcke; 9. J. Heldman; 10. F. Dürr	1. M. Smith Court; 2. B. J. King; 3. R. Casals; 4. H. Niessen Masthoff; 5. = K. Krantzcke = K. Melville; 7. V. Wade; 8. J. Heldman; 9. F. Dürr; 10. = W. Shaw = H. Hoesl = E. Goolagong

== Season statistics ==
=== Singles ===
- Total Tournaments (214)
- Most Titles: (Australia) Margaret Court (21)
- Most Finals: (Australia) Margaret Court (27)
- Most Matches Played: (Australia) Margaret Court (118)
- Most Matches Won: (Australia) Margaret Court (112)
- Match Winning %: (Australia) Margaret Court (94.9%) (minimum 40 matches)
- Most Tournaments Played: (Australia) Evonne Goolagong (36)
- Most Head-to-Heads Meets: (France) Francoise Durr v (United Kingdom) Virginia Wade (9)

== Sources ==
- Barrett, John and Tingay, Lance (1971) World Tennis 1971 A BP Year Book of. Queen Anne Press. London. England.
- Newspapers.com by Ancestry. Historical Newspaper Archive 1700s to 2000s Lindon, Utah, United States. via the Wikipedia Library.
