= Belgian National Indoor Championships =

Belgian Closed Covered Court Championships Belgian National Indoor Championships

Defunct tennis tournament
- Tour: ILTF (1928–1972); ILTF Independent Circuit (1973–1982)
- Founded: 1928; 97 years ago
- Abolished: 1982; 43 years ago
- Location: Brussels
- Venue: Various
- Surface: Hard / indoor Wood / indoor

The Belgian National Indoor Championships was a combined men's and women's closed indoor tennis tournament for Belgians only, founded in 1928 as the Belgian Closed Covered Court Championships. It was first held in Brussels, Belgium, and ran annually until 1982 when it was disconnected from the ILTF Independent Circuit.

In December 1928 the first Belgian Closed Covered Court Championships were played in Brussels, Belgium on indoor hard courts. The winner of the men's singles title was André Ewbank. The winner of the women's singles title was Josane Sigart.

The event was a closed tournament for players from Belgium only. It was always played on indoor wood courts. It ran annually as an ILTF sanctioned tournament until 1969 for men, then 1972 for women, before becoming part of the ILTF Independent Circuit (those events not part of the men's ILTF Grand Prix Circuit or women's Virginia Slims Circuit) until 1982 when it was downgraded from that tour.

== See also ==
- Belgian National Championships (outdoor tennis tournament)
- Donnay Indoor Championships (open international indoor event held in Brussels)
