= Colombo Championships =

Sri Lankan tennis tournament

Tournament information
- Founded: 1915; 110 years ago
- Editions: 108
- Location: Colombo; Sri Lanka
- Venue: Sri Lankan Tennis Association Club (1915-current)
- Category: ITF
- Surface: Grass Court/Hard Court

Current champions (June 2023)
- Women's singles: (Sri Lanka) Saajida Razick
- Men's doubles: (Sri Lanka) Ashen Silva

The Colombo Championships is a men's and women's tennis tournament founded in 1915. It is staged annually in Colombo, Sri Lanka. In 1974 it was downgraded from the official senior's worldwide ILTF Circuit. It has however continued as part of the SLTA Circuit and is a registered International Tennis Federation event.

== History ==
In 1915 the Ceylon Lawn Tennis Association (CLTA) was established. The CLTA was originally headquartered at the ‘Challet’ in Nuwara Eliya and was conducting the national Ceylon Championships founded in 1884 (now called the Sri Lankan National Championships) on clay courts located at where Hill Club now sits. The early championships were held at the Colombo Lawn Club, Since 1915 the Colombo Championships have been held for 108 editions.

== Finals ==
=== Men's singles ===
(incomplete roll)

Colombo Championships
Year	Champions	Runners-up	Score
1963	(Dominion of Ceylon) Lassantha Fernando	(Dominion of Ceylon) Kanagaratnam Arichandran	6–8, 6–1, 6–3
1964	(Dominion of Ceylon) Bernard L. Pinto	(Dominion of Ceylon) P. Senaka (Sandy) Kumara	6–4, 7–5, 6–3
1965	(Dominion of Ceylon) Bernard L. Pinto	(Dominion of Ceylon) Gamini N. Perera	6–4, 6–3, 6–2
1966	(Dominion of Ceylon) P. Senaka (Sandy) Kumara	(Dominion of Ceylon) Kanagaratnam Arichandran	7–5, 6–0
↓ Open era ↓
1969	(Dominion of Ceylon) Oscar Manuel Lisboa Pinto	(Dominion of Ceylon) P. Senaka (Sandy) Kumara	6–1, 6–4, 8–6
1970	(Dominion of Ceylon) Bernard L. Pinto	(Dominion of Ceylon) Mr. Seneviratne	6–3, 6–1, 6–1
1973	(Sri Lanka) P. Senaka (Sandy) Kumara	(Sri Lanka) Bernard L. Pinto	6–2, retd.
1974	(Sri Lanka) Lassantha Fernando	(Sri Lanka) Arjun Fernando	6–2, 6–2, 7–5
↓ ITF Event ↓
2019	(Sri Lanka) Sharmal Dissanayake	(Sri Lanka) Dineshkanthan Thangarajah	?
2021	(Sri Lanka) Thehan Wijemanne	(Sri Lanka) Chathurya Nilaweera	6–4, 4–6, 10–7
2023	(Sri Lanka) Ashen Silva	(Sri Lanka) Thehan Wijemanne	5–7, 6–4, 3–6, 6–1, 6–3

=== Women' singles ===
(incomplete roll)

Colombo Championships
Year	Champions	Runners-up	Score
1930	(British Ceylon) Zillah Weinman	(British Ceylon) M. de Livera	6–4, 7–5
↓ Open era ↓
1970	(Dominion of Ceylon) Oosha Chanmugam	(Dominion of Ceylon) Srima Abeyegunawardena	6–4, 6–3
↓ ITF Event ↓
2007	(Sri Lanka) Thavindra Ekanayake	(Sri Lanka) Tashaya Ratnayake	?
2010	(Sri Lanka) Amritha Muttiah	(Sri Lanka) Shankari Thayakaran	7–5, 6–2
2011	(Sri Lanka) Amritha Muttiah	(Sri Lanka) Nilushi Fernando	6–1, 6–2
2012	(Sri Lanka) Shankari Thayakaran	(Sri Lanka) Amritha Muttiah	6–4, 5–7, 6–2
2013	(Sri Lanka) Nethmi Waduge	(Sri Lanka) Roshenka Fernando	1–6, 6–2, 7–6
2014	(Sri Lanka) Amritha Muttiah	(Sri Lanka) Nethmi Waduge	7–5, 3–6, 6–1
2023	(Sri Lanka) Saajida Razick	(Sri Lanka) Dinara de Silva	6–3, 6–4
