= Susan Vinton =

American former professional tennis player

- Full name: Susan Vinton Chandler
- Country (sports): United States
- Born: November 13, 1953 (age 71)
- Plays: Right-handed

Singles

Grand Slam singles results
- Wimbledon: Q1 (1972)
- US Open: 1R (1970, 1972)

Susan Vinton Chandler (born November 13, 1953) is an American former professional tennis player.

Vinton, raised in Sarasota, Florida, is the daughter of Dr. Richard Vinton, a dermatologist and tennis instructor. She began competing on the professional tour in 1972 and twice featured in the US Open singles main draw. Ranked 73 in 1973. During the 1970s she married Gewan Maharaj, a tennis player from Trinidad and Tobago, but she has since remarried.

Now lives in Delray Beach, Florida.
