= Southeastern Invitation =

Defunct tennis tournament
- Tour: ILTF World Circuit
- Founded: 1953; 72 years ago
- Abolished: 1975; 50 years ago
- Location: Columbus, Georgia, United States
- Venue: Columbus Country Club
- Surface: Clay / outdoor

The Southeastern Invitation was a men's and women's clay court international tennis tournament founded in 1953. It was played at the Columbus Country Club, Columbus, Georgia, United States until 1975.

== History ==
The tournament was founded in 1953 and was played on outdoor clay courts at the Columbus Country Club, Columbus, Georgia, United States. Former winners of this event has included Herb Fitzgibbon, Mike Belkin, Frank Froehling III and Chris Evert. The tournament was run annually until 1975 when it was discontinued.
