= Moore Park Invitation =

Defunct tennis tournament
- Tour: ILTF World Circuit (1967–70)
- Founded: 1970; 55 years ago
- Abolished: 1972; 53 years ago
- Location: Moore Park, Toronto, Canada
- Venue: Moore Park tennis Club
- Surface: Hard / outdoor

The Moore Park Invitation and officially known as the Moore Park Championships was a men's and women's international hard court tennis tournament was founded in 1970. Also known as the Jelinek Moore Park Invitational (for sponsorship reasons the tournament) was first played at Moore Park tennis Club, Moore Park, Toronto, Canada. It was staged annually till 1972.

== History ==
The Moore Park Invitation tournament was founded in 1970 and was played at the Moore Park tennis Club, Moore Park, Toronto, Canada. Officially it was called the Moore Park Championships of which players were invited to play at the event. In 1972 the event was sponsored by Jelinek Sports Ltd who offered a pot of $1,050 CAD, (today worth about $8200 CAD). It was staged annually until 1972 when it was discontinued.

== Finals ==
Notes: Where a runner up is not shown or the score sections have been blanked.

=== Men's singles ===
Year	Winners	Runners-up	Score
1970	(Canada) Brian Flood	(Canada) Dale Power	6–4, 6–2.
1971	(Canada) Harry Fauquier	(Czechoslovakia) Peter Pospisil	6–3, 7–5
1972	(Canada) Keith Carpenter	(Canada) Harry Fauquier	6–3, 7–6.

=== Women's singles ===
Year	Winners	Runners-up	Score
1970	(Canada) Faye Urban	(Canada) Benita Senn	6–1, 6–1
1972	(Canada) Inge Weber	(Canada) Barb Brankovska	7–5, 4–6, 6–2
