= Waikiki Professional Challenge =

Defunct tennis tournament
- Tour: ILTF World Open Circuit
- Founded: 1970
- Abolished: 1970
- Editions: 1
- Location: Honolulu, Hawaii; United States
- Venue: The Ilikai Hotel Waikiki Tennis Courts
- Surface: Hard / outdoor

The Waikiki Professional Challenge was a USLTA/ILTF affiliated hard court tennis tournament founded in 1970. It was played at the Ilikai Hotel Waikiki tennis courts, in Waikīkī, Honolulu, Hawaii. The event ran for one edition when it was discontinued.

== Finals ==
=== Singles ===
Year	Winner	Runner-up	Score
1970	(United States) Billie Jean King	(United States) Rosie Casals	6–4, 6–4
