= Fort Lauderdale Invitational =

Defunct tennis tournament
- Tour: ILTF Circuit
- Founded: 1946
- Abolished: 1972
- Editions: 4
- Location: Fort Lauderdale, Florida; United States
- Venue: Fort Lauderdale Tennis Club
- Surface: Clay / outdoor

The Fort Lauderdale Invitational was a USLTA/ILTF combined a clay court tennis tournament first founded in 1946 as a men's event for two editions only. In 1971 the tournament was revived for two editions until 1972 when it was discontinued.

== History ==
The first iteration of this tournament was played at the Fort Lauderdale Tennis Club for one edition only in 1946 when it was stopped.

In 1958 a second version of the men's tournament was revived again for one season then stopped.

In 1971 the same venue revived the event with the same title for the third time as a combined men's and womens tournament for two seasons only before ending in 1972.

== Past finals ==
=== Men's Singles ===
Year	Winners	Runners-up	Score
1946	(United States) Gardnar Mulloy	(United States) Buddy Behrens	6–3, 6–1, 7–5.
1958	(United States) Gerry Moss	(United States) Norm Schellenger	7–5, 6–4.
1971	(United States) Cliff Richey	(South Africa) Pat Cramer	6–7, 6–7, 6–3, 6–4, 6–2
1972	(United States) Brian Gottfried	(Chile) Patricio Cornejo	4–6, 6–1, 3–6, 6–4, 6–4.

=== Women's Singles ===
Year	Winners	Runners-up	Score
1971	(United States) Chris Evert	(United States) Laurie Fleming	6–2, 6–1
1972	(United States) Laurie Fleming	(United States) Janet Haas	6–0, 6–3
