= Wiltshire County Open Championships =

Defunct tennis tournament
- Tour: ILTF Circuit
- Founded: 1920; 105 years ago
- Abolished: 1981; 44 years ago
- Location: Swindon; Tidworth; Trowbridge
- Venue: Trowbridge Westbourne Tennis Club, (1920-1968, 71, 73, 77-78, 80)
- Surface: Grass

The Wiltshire County Open Championships or simply Wiltshire Championships was a men's and women's grass court tennis tournament first established in 1920. It was held at Trowbridge Westbourne Tennis Club (f. 1913), Trowbridge, Wiltshire, England. The tournament was staged annually until 1981.

== History ==
In 1913 the Trowbridge Westbourne Tennis Club was formed. In 1920 the Wiltshire Lawn tennis Association established a county level tournament called the Wiltshire Championship. The tournament ran annually as part of the international ILTF Circuit until 1981 when it was discontinued. The tournament was mainly held at Trowbridge through till the end of the 1960s, but was also staged at Swindon and Tidworth. The Wiltshire County Championships (a closed event) is still staged today.
