= 1970 Pacific Coast International Open =

- Date: September 28 – October 4
- Edition: 82nd
- Category: Grand Prix
- Draw: 64S / 32D
- Prize money: $35,000
- Surface: Hard / outdoor
- Location: Berkeley, California, US
- Venue: Berkeley Tennis Club

Champions

Singles
- (United States) Arthur Ashe

Doubles
- (United States) Bob Lutz / (United States) Stan Smith
- Pacific Coast Championships

The 1970 Pacific Coast International Open was a men's tennis tournament played on outdoor hard courts at the Berkeley Tennis Club in Berkeley, California in the United States and was part of the Grand Prix tennis circuit. It was the 82nd edition of the tournament and ran from September 28 through October 4, 1970. Second-seeded Arthur Ashe won the singles title.

== Finals ==
=== Singles ===
(United States) Arthur Ashe defeated (United States) Cliff Richey 6–4, 6–2, 6–4

=== Doubles ===
(United States) Bob Lutz / (United States) Stan Smith defeated (United States) Roy Barth / (United States) Tom Gorman 6–2, 7–5, 4–6, 6–2
