= Poole Open =

Defunct tennis tournament
- Tour: ILTF World Circuit (1970–1971) women ILTF Independent Circuit (1970–1971) men
- Founded: 1970; 55 years ago
- Abolished: 1971; 54 years ago
- Location: Poole, Great Britain
- Venue: East Dorset Lawn Tennis & Croquet Club
- Surface: Clay / outdoor

The Poole Open was a men's and women's clay court tennis tournament founded in 1970. In 1970 the tournament was branded as the En-Tout-Cas Trophy Poole, (for sponsorship reasons) and was third leg of the En-Tout-Cas Circuit that year. The tournament was played at the East Dorset Lawn Tennis & Croquet Club (f.1909), Poole, Great Britain until 1971.

== Finals ==
=== Men's singles ===
(incomplete roll)

Year	Winners	Runners-up	Score
↓ ILTF Independent Circuit ↓
1970	(Czechoslovakia) Jan Kukal	(Australia) John Cooper	6–2, 6–3.
1971	(Italy) Franco Bartoni	(United States) Butch Seewagen	4–6, 6–2, 6–1.

=== Men's doubles ===
(incomplete roll)

Year	Winners	Runners-up	Score
↓ ILTF Independent Circuit ↓
1970	(United Kingdom) Ken Weatherley (United Kingdom) John de Mendoza	(Czechoslovakia) Jan Kukal (United Kingdom) Stanley Matthews	1–6, 6–4, 6–4

=== Women's singles ===
(incomplete roll)

Year	Winners	Runners-up	Score
↓ ILTF World Circuit ↓
1970	(United Kingdom) Joyce Williams	(Australia) Evonne Goolagong	6–2, 6–0
1971	(Ecuador) María Guzmán	(Republic of Ireland) Susan Minford	3–6, 6–3, 6–4

=== Women's doubles ===
(incomplete roll)

Year	Winners	Runners-up	Score
↓ ILTF World Circuit ↓
1970	(Australia) Patricia Edwards (Australia) Evonne Goolagong	(United Kingdom) Rita Bentley (United Kingdom) Joyce Williams	6–4, 6–8, 6–4
