= Jerusalem International Invitation =

Defunct tennis tournament
- Tour: ILTF World Circuit (1970–1972) women ILTF Independent Circuit (1970–1972) men
- Founded: 1970; 56 years ago
- Abolished: 1972; 54 years ago
- Location: Jerusalem, Israel
- Venue: Jerusalem YMCA Sports Center
- Surface: Clay / outdoor

The Jerusalem International Invitation was a men's and women's clay court tennis tournament founded in 1970. The tournament was played at the Jerusalem YMCA Sports Center, Jerusalem, Israel until 1972.

== Finals ==
=== Men's singles ===
(incomplete roll)

Year	Winners	Runners-up	Score
↓ ILTF Independent Circuit ↓
1970	(West Germany) Uwe Gottschalk	(Australia) Peter Doerner	8–6, 6–1.
1971	(Rhodesia) Hank Irvine	(Israel) Yehoshua Shalem	6–2, 6–0.
1972	(Australia) John Bartlett	(Rhodesia) Hank Irvine	6–1, 7–5.

=== Women's singles ===
(incomplete roll)

Year	Winners	Runners-up	Score
↓ ILTF World Circuit ↓
1970	(Australia) Helen Amos	(Israel) Tamar Hayat	6–4, 6–1
1971	(South Africa) Laura Rossouw	(Romania) Judith Dibar	6–3, 6–4
1972	(Canada) Andrée Martin	(Israel) Tova Epstein	6–4, 6–2
