= Tournoi de Printemps de Toulouse =

Tournoi de Printemps de Toulouse Toulouse Spring Tournament

Defunct tennis tournament
- Tour: ILTF World Circuit (1932–72); ILTF Independent Circuit (1973–74)
- Founded: 1969; 56 years ago
- Abolished: 1971; 54 years ago
- Location: Toulouse, France
- Venue: Stade Toulousain Tennis Club
- Surface: Clay (outdoors)

The Tournoi de Printemps de Toulouse also known as the Toulouse Spring Tournament was a men's and women's international tennis tournament founded in 1969. It was played at the Stade Toulousain Tennis Club, on outdoor clay courts in Toulouse, France. The event was part of the ILTF World Circuit when it was discontinued in 1972.

== History ==
In March 1969 the Stade Toulousain Tennis Club in Toulouse, France, and was played on outdoor clay courts. The tournament was part of the ILTF European Circuit a sub circuit of the ILTF World Circuit from 1969 to 1970 for men, when it became part of the ILTF Independent Circuit (those tournaments not part of the ILTF Grand Prix circuit). The women's event was also part of the world circuit until 1971.

== Finals ==
=== Men's singles ===
(incomplete roll)

Year	Winners	Runner-up	Score
1969	(Hungary) Istvan Gulyas	(France) François Jauffret	2-6, 6–2, 6–1.
1970	(France) Jean-Claude Barclay	(France) Eric Loliee	4–6, 6–2, 7–5.
1971	(France) Wanaro N'Godrella	(France) Philippe Fremiot	6-1, 6–3.

=== Women's singles ===
(incomplete roll)

Year	Winners	Runner-up	Score
1969	(Chile) Ana María Arias	(Belgium) Monique Van Haver	4–6, 6–3, 6–4
1970	(Switzerland) Anne Marie Studer	(France) Nicole Hesse-Cazaux	6–3, 6–4
1971	(France) Odile De Roubin	(South Africa) Janine Lieffrig	7–5, 4–6, 6–3
