= Norfolk Championships =

Defunct tennis tournament
- Tour: ILTF
- Founded: 1906; 119 years ago
- Abolished: 1971; 54 years ago
- Location: Norwich (1906-10, 1912, 1914-15); Great Yarmouth (1911, 1913); Cromer (1919-71)
- Surface: Grass

The Norfolk Championships also known as the Norfolk County Lawn Tennis Championships was a combined men's and women's grass court tournament originally founded in 1906. It was held in multiple locations such as Norwich, Great Yarmouth, and Cromer, England until 1971.

== History ==
The Norfolk County Lawn Tennis Championships were established in 1906. The tournament was staged continuously until 1915 just after the start of World War I. The tournament resumed in 1919 that was staged by the Cromer Lawn Tennis Club, until 1939 when it ceased for seven years until after World War II. It resumed in 1947 and continued for another 24 years until 1971 when it was abolished.

Previous winners of the men's singles title included; Nigel Sharpe and Tony Pickard. Previous winners of the women's singles championship included; Hilda Lane, Ethel Thomson Larcombe, Dorothy Kemmis-Betty Evelyn Attwood and Anne Haydon.
