= 1970 Western Championships =

- Date: July 20–26
- Edition: 70th
- Category: Grand Prix Circuit
- Draw: 64S / 32D
- Prize money: $25,000
- Surface: Clay / Outdoor
- Location: Cincinnati, Ohio, US
- Venue: Cincinnati Tennis Club

Champions

Men's singles
- (Australia) Ken Rosewall

Women's singles
- (United States) Rosie Casals

Men's doubles
- (Romania) Ilie Năstase / (Romania) Ion Țiriac

Women's doubles
- (United States) Rosie Casals / (France) Gail Chanfreau
- Cincinnati Open

The 1970 Western Championships, also known as the Cincinnati Open, was a combined men's and women's tennis tournament played on outdoor clay courts at the Cincinnati Tennis Club in Cincinnati, Ohio in the United States that was part of the 1970 Pepsi-Cola Grand Prix circuit. The tournament was held from July 20 through July 26, 1970. Ken Rosewall and Rosie Casals won the singles titles.

== Finals ==
=== Men's singles ===
(Australia) Ken Rosewall defeated (United States) Cliff Richey 7–9, 9–7, 8–6

=== Women's singles ===
(United States) Rosie Casals defeated (United States) Nancy Richey 6–3, 6–3

=== Men's doubles ===
(Romania) Ilie Năstase / (Romania) Ion Țiriac defeated (South Africa) Bob Hewitt / (South Africa) Frew McMillan 6–3, 6–4

=== Women's doubles ===
(United States) Rosie Casals / (France) Gail Chanfreau defeated (Australia) Helen Gourlay / (South Africa) Pat Walkden 12–10, 6–1
