= 1970 German Open Championships =

- Date: 10–17 August
- Edition: 60th
- Draw: 64S / 32D
- Surface: Clay / outdoor
- Location: Hamburg, West Germany
- Venue: Am Rothenbaum

Champions

Men's singles
- (Netherlands) Tom Okker

Women's singles
- (West Germany) Helga Hösl Schultze

Men's doubles
- (South Africa) Bob Hewitt / (South Africa) Frew McMillan

Women's doubles
- (Australia) Karen Krantzcke / (Australia) Kerry Melville

Mixed doubles
- (Australia) Judy Dalton / (South Africa) Frew McMillan
- German Open Tennis Championships

The 1970 German Open Championships was a combined men's and women's tennis tournament played on outdoor red clay courts. It was the 60th edition of the tournament, the third one in the Open Era, and took place at the Am Rothenbaum in Hamburg, West Germany, from 10 August through 17 August 1970. First-seeded Tom Okker and Helga Schultze-Hösl won the singles titles.

== Finals ==
=== Men's singles ===
(Netherlands) Tom Okker defeated (Romania) Ilie Năstase 4–6, 6–3, 6–3, 6–4

=== Women's singles ===
(West Germany) Helga Hösl Schultze defeated (West Germany) Helga Niessen 6–3, 6–3

=== Men's doubles ===
(South Africa) Bob Hewitt / (South Africa) Frew McMillan defeated (Netherlands) Tom Okker / (Socialist Federal Republic of Yugoslavia) Nikola Pilić 6–3, 7–5, 6–2

=== Women's doubles ===
(Australia) Karen Krantzcke / (Australia) Kerry Melville defeated (United Kingdom) Winnie Shaw / (United Kingdom) Virginia Wade 6–0, 6–1

=== Mixed doubles ===
(Australia) Judy Dalton / (South Africa) Frew McMillan defeated (Australia) Evonne Goolagong / (South Africa) Bob Hewitt 6–4, 6–4
