= Vanderbilt Indoor Open =

New York Vanderbilt Indoor Vanderbilt Indoor Open

Defunct tennis tournament
- Tour: ILTF World Circuit (1967–70)
- Founded: 1967; 58 years ago
- Abolished: 1970; 55 years ago
- Location: New York City, United States
- Venue: Vanderbilt International Racket Club
- Surface: Clay / Hard indoors

The Vanderbilt Indoor Open was a men's and women's open international indoor clay court then later hard court tennis tournament founded in 1967 as the New York Vanderbilt Indoor. It was organised by the Vanderbilt International Racket Club (f.1966) and played at Grand Central Terminal, New York City, United States until 1970. This international tournament was part of the ILTF World Circuit, until 1970 when it was discontinued.

== History ==
In the early 1960s CBS had an empty recording studio on the third floor of the Grand Central Terminal, New York City, United States. In 1966 a Hungarian immigrant businessman took over the floor lease and established private members fitness center called the Vanderbilt Athletic Club that featured two indoor clay courts, Tennis Club. In 1967 the managed by the Vanderbilt International Racket Club organised its first indoor tennis tournament. In 1968 the men's event was known as the New York Indoor Invitation. In 1970 a women's tournament was staged called the Vanderbilt Indoor Open also known as the Ladies World Invitational. The tournament at this location was discontinued.

The ladies tournament at this location was discontinued, and replaced by the Virginia Slims of Boston event in 1971 for that season only.

== Finals ==
=== Men' singles ===
(incomplete roll)

New York Vanderbilt Indoor
Year	Winners	Runners-up	Score
1967	(Australia) John Newcombe	(United States) Arthur Ashe	3–6, 6–4, 3–1, ret..
New York Indoor Invitation
1968	(United States) Eugene Scott	(United States) Chuck McKinley	6–4, 6–3, 7–5.
New York Vanderbilt Indoor
1969	(United States) Clark Graebner	(Puerto Rico) Charlie Pasarell	6–2, 6–2.

=== Women's singles ===
(incomplete roll)

Ladies World Invitational
Year	Winners	Runners-up	Score
1970.	(Australia) Margaret Court	(United Kingdom) Virginia Wade	6–3, 6–3.

== See also ==
- Madison Square Garden Open Tennis Championship (New York Indoor tennis tournament 1968 to 197O)
- Clean Air Classic (New York Indoor tennis tournament 1971 to 1972)
