= Scottish Covered Courts Tennis Championships =

Defunct tennis tournament
- Founded: 1962; 63 years ago
- Abolished: 1984; 41 years ago
- Location: Glasgow; Inverclyde; Largs
- Surface: Hard - indoors

The Scottish Covered Courts Tennis Championships or simply the Scottish Covered Courts was an open men's and women's international indoor tournament founded in 1962. The tournament ran until 1984 as part of the world wide tour. The championships were the precursor event to the current Scottish Indoor Championships.

== History ==
The Scottish Covered Courts Championships was an open men's and women's international indoor tennis tournament founded in 1962. This first tournament ran to 1970 then was discontinued. In 1982, the tournament was revived as the Scottish Covered Courts Tennis Championships until 1984 before being discontinued again. In 1988, a new indoor national tournament was revived branded as the Scottish Indoor Open Tennis Championships held in Aberdeen. The Scottish Indoor Championships (as they are called today) are still being held.
