= Marrickville and Districts Hardcourts =

Marrickville and District Hardcourts

Defunct tennis tournament
- Tour: ILTF World Circuit (1970–72); ILTF Independent Tour (1973–83)
- Founded: 1970; 56 years ago
- Abolished: 1983; 43 years ago
- Location: Marrickville, Sydney, Australia
- Venue: Marrickville Hardcourt Tennis Club
- Surface: Hard

The Marrickville and District Hardcourts was an open international men's and women's hard court tennis tournament founded in 1970. It was first organised by the Marrickville and District Hardcourt Tennis Association and played at the Marrickville Hardcourt Tennis Club, Marrickville in Sydney. This international tournament was part of the ILTF World Circuit until 1972, then the ILTF Independent Tour from 1973 to 1983 when it was discontinued.

== History ==
In 1970 the Marrickville & District Hardcourts were established by the Marrickville and District Hardcourt Tennis Association. The tournament was played on outside hard courts at the Marrickville Hardcourt Tennis Club (f.1955), Marrickville, New South Wales, Australia. This international tournament was part of the ILTF World Circuit from 1970 to 1972 then part of the ILTF Independent Tour (a worldwide series of tennis tournaments independent of the Grand Prix circuit or the WTA Tour) from 1973 to 1983 when it was discontinued.

== Finals ==
=== Men' singles ===
(incomplete roll)

Year	Winners	Runners-up	Score
1970	(Australia) Colin Dibley	(New Zealand) Ron McKenzie	6–2, 6–3.
1971	(United States) Robert Muir	(Australia) John Cottrill	6–2, 6–3.
1975	(Australia) Terry Rocavert	(Australia) Ian Pollard	6–2, 7–5.
1979	(Australia) Ian Chapman	(Australia) Bill Gilmour Jr.	6–4, 6–4.
1983	(Australia) Hans Hansson	(Australia) Jason Wilkie	6–7, 7–5, 6–0.

=== Women's singles ===
(incomplete roll)

Year	Winners	Runners-up	Score
1970	(Australia) Helen Sheedy	(Australia) Margaret Hellyer	10–8, 1–0 retd.
1971	(United States) Alice Tym	(Australia) Helen Sheedy	3–6, 6–2, 7–5
1972	(Canada) Stephanie Bardsley	(New Zealand) Jill Fraser	6–3, 7–5
