= Orange Free State Championships =

Defunct tennis tournament
- Tour: ILTF Circuit
- Founded: 1905; 121 years ago
- Abolished: 1981; 45 years ago
- Location: Bloemfontein, Orange Free State, South Africa
- Venue: Orange Free State Lawn Tennis Club
- Surface: Clay

The Orange Free State Championships was a men's and women's international tennis tournament established in 1905 as the Orange River Colony Tennis Championships and was played on outdoor clay courts at the Orange Free State Lawn Tennis Club in Orange Free State, South Africa until 1981.

== History ==
The first Free State tournament on record was played at Ramblers in 1905 and was called the Orange River Colony Tennis Championships. The championships were part of the Sugar Circuit (f.1962) of tennis tournaments from the 1960s to 1980s. In 1980 the tournament was ended due to the withdraw of sponsorship by South African Sugar Association.

== Venues ==
The original six Bloemfontein courts were built behind the Government's buildings, known as the Bloemfontein Tennis club, it later changed its name to the Orange Free State Lawn Tennis Club.
