= Manila Metropolitan Championships =

Defunct tennis tournament
- Tour: ILTF World Circuit (1930–69, 70-72); ILTF Independent Tour (1970-72) men
- Founded: 1930; 95 years ago
- Abolished: 1972; 53 years ago
- Location: Manila, Philippines
- Venue: Laong Laan Tennis Club
- Surface: Clay outdoors

The Manila Metropolitan Championships was an international men's and women's clay then later court tennis tournament founded in 1930. It was first played at the Laong Laan Tennis Club, Manila, Philippines. This international tournament was part of the ILTF World Circuit until 1972 when it was discontinued.

== History ==
The Manila Metropolitan Championships were inaugurated in 1930 and played at the Laong Laan Tennis Club, Manila, Philippines. Leonardo Gavia won the men's singles title in 1933 and 1934.

Previous winners of the men's event included; Felicisimo Ampon, Franjo Kukuljević, Raymundo Deyro, Ulf Schmidt. Former winners of women's event included Ceci Martinez, Elisa Rosales Ochoa, Irmgard Baumann, Yolanda Soemarno
