= Oakland City Open =

Defunct tennis tournament
- Event name: Oakland City Championships; Oakland City Open
- Founded: 1928; 97 years ago
- Abolished: 2016; 9 years ago
- Location: Oakland (1928-1969); Piedmont (1970-2016)
- Venue: Oakland Tennis Club; Davie Tennis Stadium
- Surface: Hard

The Oakland City Open was a men's and women's hard court tennis tournament founded in 1928 as the Oakland City Championships. The event was played at the Oakland Tennis Club Oakland, California from 1928 to 1969, the at the Davie Tennis Stadium from 1970, Piedmont, California, United States when it was discontinued.

== History ==
In April 1928 the Oakland City Championships were founded and were played at the Oakland Tennis Club, Oakland California, United States. The tournament was held in Oakland, California until 1969 when it was moved to Piedmont, California in 1970 and was then played at the Davie Tennis Stadium. The event ran annually until 2016 when it was discontinued.
