= Klamovka Indoors =

Defunct tennis tournament
- Tour: ILTF (1969) men (1969–71) women ILTF Independent Circuit (1970–71) men
- Founded: 1969; 57 years ago
- Abolished: 1972; 54 years ago
- Location: Klamovka, Prague, Czechoslovakia
- Surface: Carpet (indoors)

The Klamovka Indoors was a men's and women's international tennis tournament founded in 1969. It was organised by the Czech Tennis Association and played on indoor carpet courts at Klamovka, Prague, Czechoslovakia. The event was part of the ILTF World Circuit when it was discontinued in 1972.

== History ==
In February 1969 the Czech Tennis Association (f.1908) established the Klamovka Indoors tournament. Klamovka, Prague, Czechoslovakia The tournament was usually played at the end of February and concluding at the beginning of March annually. The event was played on indoor carpet courts.. The tournament was part of the ILTF European Circuit a sub circuit of the ILTF World Circuit from 1969 to 1970 for men, when it became part of the ILTF Independent Circuit (those tournaments not part of the ILTF Grand Prix Circuit). The women's event was also part of the world circuit until 1971.

== Finals ==
=== Men's singles ===
(incomplete roll)

Year	Winners	Runner-up	Score
1969	(Czechoslovakia) Milan Holeček	(United States) Herb Fitzgibbon	7–5, 6–4.
1970	(Czechoslovakia) Jiří Hřebec	(Czechoslovakia) Jan Písecký	4–6, 6–2, 7–5.
1971	(West Germany) Jürgen Fassbender	(Czechoslovakia) František Pála	6–8, 6–3, 6–4.

=== Women's singles ===
(incomplete roll)

Year	Winners	Runner-up	Score
1969	(Hungary) Marie Pinterová	(Czechoslovakia) Miroslava Holubová	3–6, 6–1, 6–4
1970	(Czechoslovakia) Lenka Kodešová	(Czechoslovakia) Renáta Tomanová	6–1, 6–0
1971	(Hungary) Marie Pinterová (2)	(Czechoslovakia) Miloslava Holubová	3–6, 6–1, 6–4

== See also ==
- Czech Indoor Open
- Neridé Prague Indoor
