= Belgian National Championships =

Belgian Championships Belgian National Championships

Defunct tennis tournament
- Tour: ILTF World Circuit
- Founded: 1895; 130 years ago
- Abolished: 1983; 42 years ago
- Location: Antwerp; Brussels; Liège; Spa; Tervuren
- Venue: Various
- Surface: Clay / outdoor

The Belgian National Championships was a combined men's and women's closed clay court tennis tournament (Belgian players only) founded in 1895 as the Belgian Championships. also known as the Belgian National Hard Court Championships or the Belgian Outdoor Championships. The tournament was first held in Liège, Belgium and ran annually until 1983 when it was discontinued as part of the ILTF Independent Circuit.

== History ==
In May 1895 the first Belgian Championships were founded, and was played in Liège, Belgium. The winner of the men's singles title was Baron Robert De Rossius d'Humain. In 1897 a women's singles event was first established won by Madeleine Habets who defeated a Mademoiselle G. Toussaint. The championships were a closed tournament to players from Belgium only. It ran annually as part of Belgian Circuit from 1902 to 1912. In 1913 Belgium became a founding member of the International Lawn Tennis Federation. The event was then part of the ILTF World Circuit until 1969 for men, then 1972 for women before it then became part of the ILTF Independent Circuit (those events not part of the men's ILTF Grand Prix Circuit or women's Virginia Slims Circuit until 1983 when it was downgraded from that tour. The tournament was still being held as a Belgian Tennis Federation event as late as 2004.

== Tournament records ==
=== Men's singles ===
Most titles: (Belgium) Patrick Hombergen (10)

=== Women's singles ===
Most titles: (Belgium) Christiane Mercelis (13)

== See also ==
- Belgian Open
