= 1969 ILTF Women's Tennis Circuit =

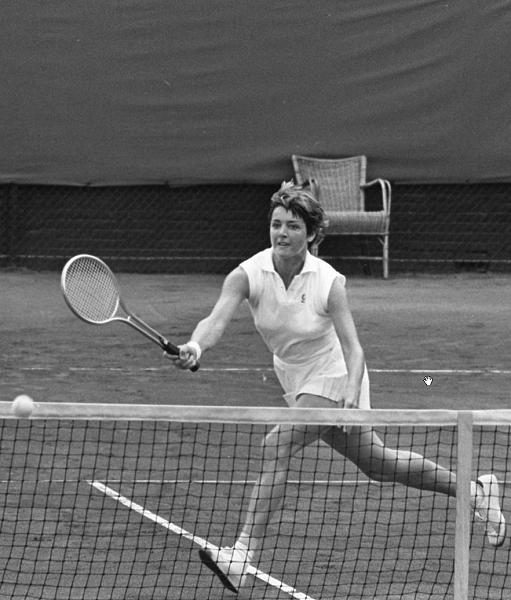
- Margaret Court is title leader this year with 19 titles won.

Details
- Duration: 1 January 1969 – 28 December 1969
- Edition: 56th (ILTF)
- Tournaments: 291
- Categories: Grand Slam (4); ILTF African Circuit (12); ILTF Asian Circuit (19); ILTF Australasia Circuit (22); ILTF Central American & Caribbean Circuit (9); ILTF European Circuit (140); ILTF North American Circuit (76); ILTF South American Circuit (6); Team Events (6)

Achievements (singles)
- Most titles: (Australia) Margaret Court (19)
- Most finals: (Australia) Margaret Court (20)

The 1969 ILTF Women's Tennis Circuit was the 56th season since the formation of the International Lawn Tennis Federation in 1913, and the 95th season since the first women's tournaments were held in 1876.

Also known as the World Tennis Circuit or simply the ILTF Circuit consisted of a worldwide series of 291 tennis tournaments played across 6 continental tennis circuits and administered by the ILTF and its associate members.

The circuit began on 1 January 1969 in East London, South Africa and ended on 28 December 1969 in Paris, France.

== Summary of season ==
From 1888 until 1912 Britain's Lawn Tennis Association (LTA), grew in status and influence to become the de facto international tennis governing body before the proper International Lawn Tennis Federation commenced operations. Despite the United States National Lawn Tennis Association (USNLTA) forming in 1881 a good seven years before the LTA, it was the British body that set laws, settled disputes and organized the increasingly complicated tournament calendar before the International Lawn Tennis Federation (ILTF) formed in March, 1913.

After the formation of the ILTF the world tennis circuit going forward was a highly organised and structured network of national and international tournaments. Most tennis tournaments were usually mixed events for men and women, and the women's international tennis circuit certainly up to 1923 was composed mainly of tournaments on the British and European Circuits. After the USNLTA joined the ILTF this would later change with more and more tournaments being staged globally. Women tennis players on the world circuit up to the open era were funded by their national associations enabling them to travel and take part in international tournaments.

The 1969 ILTF women's tennis circuit began on 1 January with the Border Championships, East London, South Africa. In the four most important tournaments of the year Margaret Court defeated the defending champion Billie Jean King in the final to win the women's singles tennis title at the Australian Open. It was her eighth Australian Open title and her fourteenth major title overall. In Paris French Open at Roland Garros. Margaret Court defeated Ann Jones in the final to win the women's singles tennis title. It was her third French Open title, her second major title of the year, and her fifteenth major overall.

In early summer in London, England at the Wimbledon Championships Britain's Ann Haydon Jones defeated the three-time defending American champion Billie Jean King in the final, to win the ladies' singles tennis title. It was her first Wimbledon title, and her third and last Grand Slam singles title overall. In New York the final Grand Slam tournament of the year is played at the US Open Australia's Margaret Court defeated Nancy Richey in the final, to win the women's singles tennis title. It was her third major singles title of the year, her third US Open singles title and her sixteenth singles major title overall. The circuit ended on 28 December 1969 at the Michel Bivort Cup tournament, Paris, France that was played indoors.

== Schedule ==
This is a calendar of all official events that were administered by the International Lawn Tennis Federation in the year 1969, with player progression documented from the quarterfinals stage where sources permit. The table also includes Grand Slam events, and tournaments on the African, Asian, Australasia, Central American & Caribbean, European, and South American ILTF regional circuits, as part of the annual world tennis circuit. Team events such as the Federation Cup and Wightman Cup are included.

Key

Grand Slam events
African Circuit.
Asian Circuit.
Australasia Circuit.
Central American/Caribbean Circuit.
European Circuit.
North American Circuit.
South American Circuit.
Team & Games events

=== January ===
Ended	Tournament	Winner	Finalist	Semi finalist	Quarter finalist
1 Jan.	Border Championships (Note: Two editions of Border State Championships were held this season, the first beginning in December 1968 and ending in January 1969, the second ending in December 1969.); East London, South Africa; Hard; Singles - Doubles	(United Kingdom) Virginia Wade; 6–1, 3–6, 6–1	(United Kingdom) Winnie Shaw		
1 Jan.	All-India Hard Court Championships (Note: Two editions of Indian Hard Courts Championships were held in 1969, the first in Visakhapatnam, the second in Madras.); Visakhapatnam, India; Clay; Singles - Doubles	(United States) Alice Tym; 6–0, 6–1	(India) Karin Peshwaria		
1 Jan.	Royal South Yarra Championships; South Yarra, Australia; Grass; Singles - Doubles	(Australia) Val Bermingham; 3–6, 6–1, 6–4	(Australia) Kerry Wilkinson		
1 Jan.	Asian Championships; Calcutta South Club; Calcutta, India; Grass; Singles - Doubles	(India) Nirupama Vasant; 6–1, 3–6, 6–3	(United States) Alice Tym		
4 Jan.	Eastern Province Championships; East London, South Africa; Hard; Singles - Doubles	(Rhodesia) Pat Walkden; 6–4, 6–2	(United Kingdom) Virginia Wade	(United States) Kathy Harter (United Kingdom) Winnie Shaw	(South Africa) Maryna Godwin (South Africa) Brenda Kirk (United States) Vicky Rogers (United Kingdom) Nell Truman
4 Jan.	North Island Open Championships; Hamilton, New Zealand; Grass; Singles - Doubles	(New Zealand) Sue Blackwood; 3–6, 6–1, 6–4	(New Zealand) Pam Rogan	(New Zealand) Elaine Stephan (New Zealand) Beverly Vercoe	(New Zealand) Margaret O' Carroll (New Zealand) Elizabeth Odgers
5 Jan.	Tasmanian Open; Domain Tennis Center; Hobart, Australia; Grass; Singles - Doubles	(Australia) Kerry Melville; 6–3, 6–3	(United States) Rosie Casals	(Australia) Lesley Turner Bowrey (Australia) Karen Krantzcke	(Australia) Evonne Goolagong (Australia) Helen Gourlay (Australia) Kerry Harris (United States) Billie Jean King
5 Jan.	Western Australian Open; Royal King's Park TC; Perth, Australia; Grass – $4,773; Singles - Doubles	(Australia) Margaret Court; 7–5, 6–1	(Australia) Lesley Hunt	(France) Francoise Durr (United Kingdom) Ann Haydon Jones	(Australia) Anne Coleman (Australia) Pam Hatt (Australia) Judy Tegart (Australia) Kerryl Treasure
5 Jan.	Manly Seaside Championships; Manly LTC; Manly, Australia; Grass; Singles - Doubles	(France) Gail Chanfreau; 6–0, 6–0	(Indonesia) Lany Kaligis	(Australia) Norma Marsh (Australia) Frances Luff	
5 Jan.	All-India Hard Court Championships (Note: Two editions of Indian Hard Courts Championships were held in 1969, the first in Visakhapatnam, the second in Madras.); Madras, India; Clay; Singles - Doubles	(United States) Alice Tym; 4–6, 6–1, 6–3	(Romania) Judith Dibar	(Sri Lanka) Sriya Gunaratne (India) Nirupama Vasant	
11 Jan.	Mallorca International; Palma, Spain; Clay; Singles - Doubles	(Spain) Ana María Estalella; 6–3, 6–3	(Belgium) Ingrid Loeys		
11 Jan.	Orange Free State Championships; Bloemfontein, South Africa; Hard; Singles - Doubles	(Rhodesia) Pat Walkden; 6–4, 10–8	(United Kingdom) Virginia Wade	(South Africa) Anita van Deventer (United Kingdom) Winnie Shaw	(United Kingdom) Corinne Molesworth (United States) Vicky Rogers (United Kingdom) Nell Truman
12 Jan.	Victorian Open; Melbourne, Australia; Grass – $12,120; Singles - Doubles	(Australia) Margaret Court; 6–1, 6–4	(Australia) Kerry Harris	(Australia) Karen Krantzcke (Australia) Kerry Melville	(Australia) Lesley Turner Bowrey (France) Gail Chanfreau (Australia) Helen Gourlay (Australia) Lesley Hunt
12 Jan.	New Zealand Championships; Auckland, New Zealand; Grass; Singles - Doubles	(New Zealand) Beverly Vercoe; 3–6, 6–1, 6–4	(New Zealand) Shirley Collins	(New Zealand) Jill Bloxham (New Zealand) Patsy Stevens	(New Zealand) Sue Blackwood (New Zealand) Robyn Legge (New Zealand) Marilyn Pride (New Zealand) Pam Rogan
12 Jan.	South Florida Open Championships; West Palm Beach TC; West Palm Beach, United States; Clay; Singles - Doubles	(United States) Stephanie DeFina; 6–1, 6–2	(Argentina) Anna Maria Cavadini	(United States) Martha Cochran (Cuba) Pilar Herrero	(United States) Karol Gagliano
12 Jan.	Indian National Championships; New Delhi, India; Clay; Singles - Doubles	(Romania) Judith Dibar; 6–2, 6–1	(United States) Alice Tym	(India) Chere Surendra (India) Nirupama Vasant	
18 Jan.	Western Province Championships; Cape Town, South Africa; Hard; Singles - Doubles	(United Kingdom) Virginia Wade; 6–4, 6–1	(Rhodesia) Pat Walkden	(South Africa) Annette Du Plooy (United Kingdom) Winnie Shaw	(South Africa) Marianne Brummer (South Africa) Maryna Godwin (United States) Vicky Rogers (United Kingdom) Nell Truman
19 Jan.	AMPOL New South Wales Open; Sydney, Australia; Grass – $27,750; Singles - Doubles	(Australia) Margaret Court; 6–1, 6–2	(United States) Rosie Casals	(United States) Billie Jean King (Australia) Kerry Melville	(Australia) Lesley Turner Bowrey (United Kingdom) Ann Haydon Jones (Australia) Judy Tegart (Australia) Karen Krantzcke
19 Jan.	Northern India and Punjab State Championships; Amritsar, India; Clay; Singles - Doubles	(Romania) Judith Dibar; 6–1, 5–7, 7–5	(United States) Alice Tym	(India) Karin Peshawaria (India) Rita Peshawaria	
19 Jan.	French Covered Court Championships; Stade de Coubertin; Paris, France; Wood (i); Singles - Doubles	(Netherlands) Betty Stöve; 6–3, 6–3	(France) Janine Lieffrig	(Belgium) Ingrid Loeys (Netherlands) Judith Salomé	(France) Jacqueline Berson (France) Nicole Cazaux (France) Rosie Darmon (Netherlands) Marijke Schaar
19 Jan.	Florida State Open Championships; Orlando, United States; Clay; Singles - Doubles	(United States) Stephanie DeFina; 6–3, 6–3	(United States) Wendy Overton	(United States) Judy Alvarez (United States) Chris Koutras	(Argentina) Ana Maria Cavadini (Denmark) Dorte Ekner (United States) Karol Gagliano (United States) Mona Schallau
19 Jan.	March of Dimes Open; San Diego, United States; Hard; Singles - Doubles	(United States) Janet Newberry; 6–2, 6–1	(United States) Mary Struthers	(United States) Maricaye Christenson (United States) Kristien Kemmer	
26 Jan.	Austin Smith Championships; Fort Lauderdale, United States; Clay; Singles - Doubles	(United States) Stephanie DeFina; 6–3, 7–5	(United States) Mary-Ann Eisel	(United States) Chris Evert (Brazil) Suzana Petersen	(United States) Denise Conill (United States) Jane Hancock (United States) Bunny Smith (United States) Ann Lentz
26 Jan.	Danish Indoor Championships; Copenhagen, Denmark; Wood (i); Singles - Doubles	(Denmark) Mari Ann Bloch Jorgensen ?	(Denmark) Milly Vagn Nielsen		
26 Jan.	West German Indoor Championships; Cologne, West Germany; Wood (i); Singles - Doubles	(Sweden) Christina Sandberg; 6–3, 2–6, 8–6	(United Kingdom) Christine Truman Janes	(Sweden) Margareta Strandberg (United Kingdom) Joyce Williams	(West Germany) Heide Orth (Czechoslovakia) Alena Palmeova (Netherlands) Betty Stöve (West Germany) Almut Sturm
27 Jan.	North Shore Championships; Forrest Hill, New Zealand; Grass; Singles - Doubles	(Japan) Kimiyo Hatanaka; 5–7, 6–0, 7–5	(Taiwan) Sei-Rei Cho	(Japan) Reiko Miyagi (New Zealand) Cecily Mckillop	(New Zealand) Margaret O' Carroll (New Zealand) Pam Rogan (New Zealand) Tup Singer (New Zealand) Beverly Vercoe
27 Jan.	Australian Open; Milton Courts; Brisbane, Australia; Grass; Singles - Doubles	(Australia) Margaret Court; 6–4, 6–1	(United States) Billie Jean King	(United Kingdom) Ann Haydon Jones (Australia) Kerry Melville	(United States) Rosie Casals (Australia) Helen Gourlay (Australia) Lesley Hunt (Australia) Karen Krantzcke
27 Jan.	Australian Open; Milton Courts; Brisbane, Australia; Grass; Singles - Doubles	(Australia) Margaret Court (Australia) Judy Dalton; 6–4, 6–4	(United States) Rosie Casals (United States) Billie Jean King	(United Kingdom) Ann Haydon Jones (Australia) Kerry Melville	(United States) Rosie Casals (Australia) Helen Gourlay (Australia) Lesley Hunt (Australia) Karen Krantzcke
28 Jan.	Central India Championships; New Delhi, India; Clay; Singles - Doubles	(United States) Alice Tym; 6–4, 6–3	(Romania) Judith Dibar	(India) Karin Peshawaria (Sweden) Eva Lundquist	

=== February ===
Ended	Tournament	Winner	Finalist	Semi finalist	Quarter finalist
2 Feb.	New Zealand Open; Stanley St Courts; Auckland, New Zealand; Grass - $10,000; Singles - Doubles	(United Kingdom) Ann Haydon Jones; 6–1, 6–1	(Australia) Karen Krantzcke	(Australia) Gail Sherriff Chanfreau (United States) Billie Jean King	(New Zealand) Ruia Morrison-Davy (Australia) Helen Gourlay (Japan) Kimiyo Hatanaka (New Zealand) Beverley Vercoe
2 Feb.	Scandinavian Open Indoor; Helsinki, Finland; Wood (i); Singles - Doubles	(Sweden) Christina Sandberg; 8–6, 3–6, 6–4	(United Kingdom) Christine Truman Janes	(Finland) Birgitta Lindström (United Kingdom) Joyce Williams	(Norway) Kirsten Robsahm (Sweden) Gudrun Johnson Rosin (Sweden) Margareta Strandberg
2 Feb.	Rajasthan State Championships round robin event Jaipur, India; Clay; Singles - Doubles	(United States) Alice Tym (Sweden) Eva Lundqvist; 3–6, 6–3, 7–7	rain abandoned play divided title	(Romania) Judith Dibar (3rd) (India) Indu Sood (4th)	
2 Feb.	City of Miami Championships; Miami, United States; Clay; Singles - Doubles	(United States) Stephanie DeFina; 6–1, 6–2	(Brazil) Suzana Petersen	(United States) Sherry Bedingfield (United States) Karol Gagliano	(United States) Carol Eckert (United States) Carol Ford (United States) Annette Paluska (United States) Bunny Smith
8 Feb.	Los Angeles Metropolitan Championships; Los Angeles, United States; Hard; Singles - Doubles	(Canada) Faye Urban; 8–6, 6–3	(United States) Betty Ann Grubb	(United States) Pat Cody (United States) Marilyn Joseph	(United States) Barbara Grubb (United States) Withney Grant (United States) Evelyn Houseman (United States) Tina Watanabe
9 Feb.	Polish Indoor Championships; Gdańsk, Poland; Wood (i); Singles - Doubles	(Poland) Danuta Rylska; 6–1, 6–3	(Poland) Barbara Kralówna		
10 Feb.	USSR All-Union Championships; Moscow, Soviet Union; Carpet (i); Singles - Doubles	(Soviet Union) Olga Morozova; 6–2, 4–6, 6–3	(Soviet Union) Galina Baksheeva	(Soviet Union) Tiiu Kivi (Soviet Union) Anna Ivanova	(Soviet Union) Rauza Islanova (Soviet Union) Lilia Karpova (Soviet Union) T Taranova (Soviet Union) Zaiga Yansone
16 Feb.	Moscow Open Championships round robin event Moscow, Soviet Union; Carpet (i); Singles - Doubles	(Soviet Union) Olga Morozova; 6–1, 4–6, 6–4	(Soviet Union) Marina Chuvirina	(Soviet Union) Rauza Islanova (3rd) (Soviet Union) Maria Kull (4th)	(Soviet Union) Y Bantle (Soviet Union) Yevgenyia Izopaitis (Soviet Union) Yekaterina Kruchkova (Soviet Union) Y Slepchenko
16 Feb.	New South Wales Hard Court Championships; Cowra, Australia; Clay; Singles - Doubles	(Australia) Evonne Goolagong; 6–4, 6–2	(Australia) Wendy Gilchrist	(Australia) Patricia Coleman (Australia) Margaret Starr	(Australia) Patricia Edwards (Australia) Helen Sheedy
18 Feb.	New England Indoor Championships; Pioneer Valley Indoor Tennis Centre; Agawam, United States; Uniturf (i); Singles - Doubles	(United States) Mary-Ann Eisel; 7–5, 6–2	(South Africa) Esmé Emmanuel	(United States) Stephanie De Fina (United States) Kristy Pigeon	(United States) Betty Ann Grubb (United States) Patti Hogan (United States) Ceci Martinez (Netherlands) Astrid Suurbeck
22 Feb.	Moscow International Indoor Championships; Moscow, Soviet Union; Carpet (i); Singles - Doubles	(Soviet Union) Olga Morozova; 6–2, 4–6, 6–3	(Netherlands) Betty Stöve	(Soviet Union) Marina Chuvirina (United Kingdom) Winnie Shaw	(Netherlands) Ada Bakker (Soviet Union) Galina Baksheeva (Soviet Union) Lilia Karpova (Soviet Union) Tiiu Kivi
23 Feb.	United States Indoor Championships; Winchester Center; Winchester, United States; Neoturf (i); Singles - Doubles	(United States) Mary-Ann Eisel; 6–3, 4–6, 6–2	(United States) Stephanie DeFina	(United States) Cecilia Martinez (United States) Tory Ann Fretz	(United States) Marilyn Aschner (United States) Peaches Bartkowicz (South Africa) Esmé Emmanuel (United States) Kristy Pigeon
26 Feb.	Oakland Invitational Pro Championships; Chabot College Tennis Centre; Hayward, United States; Carpet (i) - $18,000; Singles - Doubles	(United States) Billie Jean King; 6–2, 6–2	(United Kingdom) Ann Haydon Jones	(United States) Rosie Casals (France) Francoise Durr	(United States) Althea Gibson-Darben
28 Feb.	Portland Pros; Memorial Coliseum; Portland, United States; Carpet (i) - $12,000; Singles - Doubles	(United States) Billie Jean King; 6–2, 6–2	(United Kingdom) Ann Haydon Jones	(United States) Rosie Casals (United States) Althea Gibson-Darben	

=== March ===
Ended	Tournament	Winner	Finalist	Semi finalist	Quarter finalist
1 Mar.	Kingston International Invitation; Liguanea Club; Kingston, Jamaica; Hard; Singles - Doubles	(Australia) Lesley Bowrey; 4–6, 6–2, 9–7	(United States) Patti Hogan	(United States) Stephanie DeFina (United States) Kristy Pigeon	(Australia) Karen Krantzcke (Canada) Faye Urban (Australia) Kerry Melville (Colombia) Christina de Soto
1 Mar.	Czechoslovakian Indoor Championships; Prague, Czechoslovakia; Wood (i); Singles - Doubles	(Czechoslovakia) Marie Neumannová; 6–3, 6–4	(Czechoslovakia) Vlasta Vopickova	(Czechoslovakia) Miloslava Holubová (Czechoslovakia) Eva Matejkova	(Czechoslovakia) Renata Chmelikova (Czechoslovakia) Zdenka Strnadova (Czechoslovakia) Miroslava Kozeluhova
2 Mar.	Curaçao International Championships; Curaçao Racing Club; Willemstad, Curaçao; Hard; Singles - Doubles	(United States) Julie Heldman; 5–7, 6–1, 10–8	(United States) Nancy Richey	(Australia) Margaret Court (Australia) Judy Tegart	(Netherlands) Judith Salomé (West Germany) Almut Sturm (Netherlands) Astrid Suurbeck (United States) Val Ziegenfuss
2 Mar.	Redcliffe Championships; Redcliffe, Australia; Grass; Singles - Doubles	(Australia) Marilyn Tesch; 2–6, 6–4, 6–3	(Australia) Lexie Kenny		
3 Mar.	Coupe Cozon; Lyon, France; Wood (i); Singles - Doubles	(Belgium) Ingrid Loeys; 8–10, 7–5, 5–2, retd.	(France) Christiane Sarazin		
3 Mar.	Bavarian Indoor Championships; Munich, West Germany; Wood (i); Singles - Doubles	(Netherlands) Betty Stöve; 6–4, 6–4	(West Germany) Katja Ebbinghaus	(Czechoslovakia) Alena Palmeová (West Germany) Amelie Ring	(Netherlands) Ada Bakker (West Germany) Heidi Boeck (West Germany) Renate Breuer (West Germany) Margarete Schweikert
8 Mar.	Los Angeles Invitational Pro Championships; LA Forum; Inglewood, United States; Carpet (i); Singles - Doubles	(United States) Billie Jean King; 17–15, 6–3	(United Kingdom) Ann Haydon Jones	(United States) Rosie Casals (France) Francoise Durr	
8 Mar.	San Francisco Golden Gate Class Tournament 65th ed San Francisco, United States; Hard; Singles - Doubles	(United States) Marcie Louie; 6–4, 6–3	(United States) Eliza Pande	(United States) Cathie Anderson (United States) Debbie Pruitt	(United States) Bernise Adams (United States) Farel Footman (United States) Mary Hill (United States) Judy Leong
9 Mar.	Lodi Indoor Invitational; Grape Pavilion; Lodi, United States; Carpet (i); Singles - Doubles	(United States) Denise Carter; 7–9, 7–5, 6–2	(United States) Sharon Walsh	(South Africa) Esmé Emmanuel (United States) Gail Hansen	(United States) Cathie Anderson (United States) June Gay (United States) Jackie Gondring (United States) Ceci Martinez
9 Mar.	Menton International; Menton TC; Menton, France; Clay; Singles - Doubles	(France) Jacqueline Venturino; 6–3, 6–4	(Argentina) Ana Maria Cavadini	(France) Nicole Cazaux (Argentina) Raquel Giscafré	(Italy) Roberta Beltrame (Belgium) Ingrid Loeys (Socialist Federal Republic of Yugoslavia) Irena Škulj (Australia) Margaret Starr
9 Mar.	Altamira International Open Invitation; Altamira TC; Caracas, Venezuela; Hard; Singles - Doubles	(Australia) Margaret Court default arm injury	(Brazil) Maria Bueno	(Australia) Lesley Turner Bowrey (Australia) Judy Tegart	(Czechoslovakia) Lenka Kodesova (Australia) Karen Krantzcke (Australia) Kerry Melville (West Germany) Helga Niessen
9 Mar.	All Japan Indoor Championships; Tokyo Metropolitan Gymnasium; Tokyo, Japan; Carpet (i); Singles - Doubles	(Japan) Kazuko Sawamatsu; 6–2, 7–5	(Japan) Kimiyo Hatanaka	(Japan) Yaeko Matsuda (Japan) Junko Sawamatsu	
9 Mar.	Swedish Indoor Championships; Stockholm, Sweden; Wood (i); Singles - Doubles	(Sweden) Christina Sandberg; 4–6, 6–1, 6–3	(Sweden) Margareta Strandberg		
9 Mar.	Long Island VASS Invitation round robin Brookville, United States; Carpet (i); Singles - Doubles	(United States) Mary-Ann Eisel; 31–27	(United States) Stephanie DeFina (2nd)	(United States) Vicky Rogers (3rd) (United States) Carole Graebner (4th)	
16 Mar.	Egyptian International Championships; Gezira Sporting Club; Cairo, Egypt; Clay; Singles - Doubles	(Italy) Lea Pericoli; 6–1, 6–2	(Soviet Union) Olga Morozova	(France) Gail Sherriff Chanfreau (United Kingdom) Winnie Shaw	(United Kingdom) Robin Lloyd (Argentina) Graciela Morán (Austria) Sonja Pachta (United Kingdom) Nell Truman
16 Mar.	Beaulieu International Championships; Beaulieu-sur-Mer, France; Clay; Singles - Doubles	(Belgium) Ingrid Loeys; 6–2, 6–0	(Netherlands) Marijke Schaar	(United Kingdom) Jill Cooper (Hungary) Erzsebet Polgar	
16 Mar.	Ciudad de Barranquilla Open; Barranquilla Country Club; Barranquilla, Columbia; Clay; Singles - Doubles	(United States) Julie Heldman; 5–7, 6–2, 6–3	(United States) Peaches Bartkowicz	(Australia) Margaret Court (United Kingdom) Virginia Wade	(Australia) Lesley Turner Bowrey (Australia) Kerry Melville (West Germany) Helga Niessen (Australia) Judy Tegart
22 Mar.	Alexandria International Championships; Alexandria, Egypt; Clay; Singles - Doubles	(United Kingdom) Nell Truman; 6–2, 2–6, 6–3	(Soviet Union) Olga Morozova	(Argentina) Graciela Morán (United Kingdom) Winnie Shaw	(France) Gail Chanfreau (United Kingdom) Robin Lloyd (Austria) Sonja Pachta (Egypt) Nameeda Zaki
23 Mar.	Czechoslovakian National Indoor Championships; Klamovka, Czechoslovakia; Wood (i); Singles - Doubles	(Czechoslovakia) Marie Neumanová; 6–3, 6–4	(Czechoslovakia) Vlasta Vopickova		
23 Mar.	WLOD Invitational; Lighthouse Point Tennis Club; Fort Lauderdale, United States; Clay; Singles - Doubles	(United States) Julie Heldman; 31–27	(United Kingdom) Virginia Wade	(Australia) Margaret Court (United States) Stephanie DeFina	(United States) Peaches Bartkowicz (United States) Chris Evert (United States) Kristy Pigeon (Australia) Judy Tegart
23 Mar.	Masters Invitational; St. Petersburg Tennis Club; St. Petersburg, United States; Clay; Singles - Doubles	(Australia) Kerry Melville; 31–27	(Australia) Lesley Bowrey	(United States) Mary-Ann Eisel (United States) Tory Ann Fretz	(United States) Judy Alvarez (Australia) Maureen Pratt (United States) Patty Ann Reese (West Germany) Almut Sturm
23 Mar.	Phoenix Thunderbird Invitation; Phoenix Country Club; Phoenix, United States; Clay; Singles - Doubles	(United States) Nancy Richey; 6–2, 6–0	(United States) Patti Hogan	(South Africa) Esmé Emmanuel (United States) Ceci Martinez	(United States) Emilie Burrer (United States) Denise Carter (United States) Betty Ann Grubb (United States) Peggy Michel
23 Mar.	Cannes International Championships; Cannes, France; Clay; Singles - Doubles	(Netherlands) Marijke Schaar; 4–6, 6–2, 6–0	(Netherlands) Betty Stöve	(United Kingdom) Jill Cooper (France) Odile de Roubin	(France) Nicole Hesse-Cazaux (Ecuador) María Guzmán (Belgium) Ingrid Loeys (Socialist Federal Republic of Yugoslavia) Irena Škulj
30 Mar.	South of France Championships; Nice LTC; Nice, France; Clay; Singles - Doubles	(United States) Peaches Bartkowicz; 6–3, 6–4	(France) Gail Chanfreau	(Netherlands) Marijke Schaar (United Kingdom) Winnie Shaw	(Czechoslovakia) Vlasta Kodesova (United Kingdom) Robin Lloyd (Czechoslovakia) Alena Palmeova (Netherlands) Betty Stöve
30 Mar.	Torneo Internazionale di Tennis Parioli; Tennis Club Parioli; Rome, Italy; Clay; Singles - Doubles	(Ecuador) María Guzmán; 2–6, 6–3, 6–3	(Argentina) Mabel Vrancovich	(Italy) Roberta Beltrame (Australia) Margaret Starr	(Italy) Sylvana Lazzarino (France) Marielle Lombard (Italy) Maria Monami (Italy) Graziella Perna

=== April ===
Ended	Tournament	Winner	Finalist	Semi finalist	Quarter finalist
5 Apr.	Reggio Calabria International; Reggio Calabria, Italy; Clay; Singles - Doubles	(Czechoslovakia) Marie Neumannová; 6–4, 2–6, 6–4	(Italy) Maria Nasuelli	(Italy) Monique Di Maso (Sweden) Ulla Sandulf	(Peru) Virginia Caceres (Ecuador) María Guzmán (United Kingdom) Frances Maclennan (Italy) Daniela Marzano
6 Apr.	Monte-Carlo International 2nd ed Monte Carlo Country Club; Monte Carlo, Monaco; Clay; Singles - Doubles	(United States) Peaches Bartkowicz; 6–4, 2–6, 6–4	(Czechoslovakia) Vlasta Kodesova	(Italy) Lea Pericoli (United Kingdom) Winnie Shaw	(France) Gail Chanfreau (West Germany) Katja Ebbinghaus (Argentina) Graciela Morán (Sweden) Eva Lundquist
6 Apr.	Caribe Hilton Invitational 17th ed Caribe Hilton Hotel; San Juan, Puerto Ricoo; Hard; Singles - Doubles	(Australia) Margaret Court; 6–4, 7–5	(United States) Julie Heldman	(Australia) Judy Tegart (United States) Linda Tuero	(United States) Mary-Ann Eisel (United States) Tory Ann Fretz (Australia) Karen Krantzcke (West Germany) Helga Niessen
6 Apr.	Greater Jacksonville Invitation; Jacksonville Golf & Country Club; Jacksonville, United States; Clay; Singles - Doubles	(United States) Judy Alvarez; 6–2, 6–0	(United States) Wendy Overton	(United States) Charlene Grafton (United States) Chris Koutras	(United States) Carole Ford (United States) Gay Gordon (United States) Judy Moore (United States) Peggy Michel
6 Apr.	San Luis Potosi Open; San Luis Potosí, Mexico; Clay; Singles - Doubles	(Mexico) Elena Subirats; 6–3, 5–7, 6–2	(Mexico) Lulu Gongora	(Mexico) Lourdes Diaz Ponce (Mexico) Cecilia Rosado	(Mexico) Alina de Balbiers (United States) Emily Fisher (Mexico) Olga Montano (Mexico) Patricia Montano
6 Apr.	Northern California Indoor Championships; Diablo Valley College; Diablo Valley, United States; Carpet (i); Singles - Doubles	(United States) Barbara Downs; 6–2, 6–0	(United States) Farel Footman	(United States) Diane Brooks (United States) Cathy Gagel Anderson	
6 Apr.	Royal Palm Invitational; Royal Palm Tennis Club; Miami, United States; Clay; Singles - Doubles	(United States) Karen Benson default	(United States) Donna Floyd Fales	(United States) Ann Lentz (United States) Susan Parkhurst	
6 Apr.	San Jose State All-Comers Championship; Spartan Tennis Complex; San Jose, United States; Hard; Singles - Doubles	(United States) Denise Carter; 6–2, 8–6	(United States) Eliza Pande	(United States) Gail Hansen (United States) Sharon Walsh	(United States) Cathy Gagel Anderson (United States) Farel Footman (United States) Judy Leong (United States) Marlene Muench
6 Apr.	Lugano International; Tennis Club Lugano; Lugano, Switzerland; Clay; Singles - Doubles	(Switzerland) Anne-Marie Studer; 6–4, 6–4	(Belgium) Ingrid Loeys		
6 Apr.	West Hollywood Championships (16th ed); Plummer Park TC; West Hollywood, United States; Hard; Singles - Doubles	(United States) Stephanie Grant; 6–2, 6–0	(United States) Pam Austin	(United States) Joan Johnson (Ecuador) Ana María Ycaza	
8 Apr.	North of England Hard Court Championships; Argyle Lawn Tennis Club; Southport, Great Britain; Clay; Singles - Doubles	(United Kingdom) Shirley Brasher; 6–1, 3–6, 6–0	(United Kingdom) Janice Townsend	(New Zealand) Cecilie Fleming (United Kingdom) Marjory Love	
8 Apr.	Tally-Ho! Easter Tournament; Tally-Ho! Tennis Club; Birmingham, Great Britain; Clay; Singles - Doubles	(United Kingdom) Susan Tutt; 6–2, 6–2	(United Kingdom) Susan Morgan	(United Kingdom) Dianne Bridger (United Kingdom) Alex Soady	(United Kingdom) Jean Mc Farlane (United Kingdom) Jean Rickson
8 Apr.	Israel Spring International Championships; Tel Aviv, Israel; Clay; Singles - Doubles	(United States) Alice Tym; 6–4, 6–1	(Israel) Tova Epstein	(Israel) Pauline Peisachov (Israel) Roberta Zimman	
13 Apr.	Carolinas International; Julian Clark Tennis Stadium; Charlotte, United States; Hard; Singles - Doubles	(Australia) Margaret Court; 6–2, 6–0	(Australia) Judy Tegart	(West Germany) Helga Niessen (Sweden) Christina Sandberg	(United States) Mary-Ann Eisel (United States) Stephanie DeFina (United States) Tory Ann Fretz (United States) Kristy Pigeon
13 Apr.	Mediterranean Club Championships; Tennis Club de Mediterranean; Nice, France; Clay; Singles - Doubles	(United Kingdom) Robin Lloyd; 6–4, 2–6, 6–4	(Sweden) Eva Lundquist	(United Kingdom) Winnie Shaw (Argentina) Mabel Vrancovich	(France) Nicole Cazaux (France) Rosie Darmon (France) Raquel Giscafré (United Kingdom) Sally Holdsworth
13 Apr.	Catania International Open; Catania, Italy; Clay; Singles - Doubles	(Italy) Maria Nasuelli; 6–1, 6–2	(Ecuador) María Guzmán	(Italy) Monique Di Maso (Czechoslovakia) Marie Neumannová	(Czechoslovakia) Miroslava Holubova (Italy) Miss Giarrusso (Sweden) Ulla Sandulf (Argentina) Mabel Vrancovich
13 Apr.	Pan American Championships; Centro Deportivo Chapultepec; Mexico City, Mexico; Clay; Singles - Doubles	(United States) Valerie Ziegenfuss; 1–6, 7–5, 6–2	(Mexico) Lourdes Gongorga	(Mexico) Patricia Montano (Mexico) Elena Subirats	(United States) Judy Dixon (Mexico) Olga Montano (Mexico) Nancy De Realme
14 Apr.	South African Open Championships; Ellis Park Tennis Stadium; Johannesburg , South Africa; Hard; Singles - Doubles	(United States) Billie Jean King; 6–4, 1–6, 6–3	(United States) Nancy Richey	(United Kingdom) Ann Haydon Jones (United Kingdom) Virginia Wade	(Australia) Kerry Harris (South Africa) Brenda Kirk (South Africa) Melanie Muller (South Africa) Annette Du Plooy
19 Apr.	Israel Invitation; Netanya, Israel; Clay; Singles - Doubles	(United States) Alice Tym; 6–0, 6–0	(Israel) Susan Korn	(South Africa) Gillian Kay (Israel) Roberta Zimman	
20 Apr.	Natal Open Championships; Westridge Park Tennis Stadium; Durban, South Africa; Hard; Singles - Doubles	(United States) Billie Jean King; 6–4, 6–1	(South Africa) Annette Van Zyl	(South Africa) Maryna Proctor (Rhodesia) Pat Walkden	(Australia) Helen Gourlay (Australia) Lesley Hunt (South Africa) Laura Rossouw (South Africa) Anita van Deventer
20 Apr.	Campionati Internazionali di Sicilia; Circolo Tennis Palermo; Palermo, Italy; Clay; Singles - Doubles	(Czechoslovakia) Marie Neumannová; 2–6, 8–6, 6–0	(Italy) Anna-Maria Nasuelli	(Italy) Monique Salfati-Di Maso (Australia) Margaret Starr	(Ecuador) María Guzmán (Czechoslovakia) Miloslava Holubová (Sweden) Ulla Sandulf
20 Apr.	River Oaks Invitational; Houston, United States; Clay; Singles - Doubles	(Australia) Margaret Court; 3–6, 7–5, 6–1	(Australia) Judy Tegart-Dalton	(Australia) Lesley Bowrey (Australia) Kerry Melville	(United States) Tory Ann Fretz (Australia) Karen Krantzcke (Sweden) Christina Sandberg (United States) Linda Tuero
21 Apr.	Monte-Carlo Open Championships; Monte Carlo, Monaco; Clay; Singles - Doubles	(United Kingdom) Ann Haydon Jones; 6–1, 6–3	(United Kingdom) Virginia Wade	(France) Francoise Durr (United States) Julie Heldman	(United States) Peaches Bartkowicz (Soviet Union) Olga Morozova (United Kingdom) Sally Holdsworth (Argentina) Mabel Vrankovich
26 Apr.	Cumberland Hard Court Championships; The Cumberland Club; Hampstead, Great Britain; Singles - Doubles	(United Kingdom) Joyce Williams; 7–5, 6–2	(United Kingdom) Winnie Shaw	(United Kingdom) Robin Lloyd (United Kingdom) Janice Townsend	(United Kingdom) Shirley Brasher (United Kingdom) Jill Cooper (Australia) Kerry Harris (Australia) Fay Moore
26 Apr.	Anaheim Open; Anaheim, United States; Hard; Singles - Doubles	(United States) Carole Graebner; 8–6, 6–4	(United States) Pam Teeguarden		
27 Apr.	Italian Open; Foro Italico; Rome, Italy; Clay; Singles - Doubles	(United States) Julie Heldman; 7–5, 6–4	(Australia) Kerry Melville	(France) Francoise Durr (United Kingdom) Ann Haydon Jones	(United States) Peaches Bartkowicz (Australia) Lesley Bowrey (United States) Billie Jean King (Italy) Lea Pericoli
27 Apr.	Ojai Valley Championships 70th ed Ojai, United States; Hard; Singles - Doubles	(United States) Betty Ann Grubb; 3–6, 6–2, 6–3	(United States) Denise Carter	(United States) Janie Albert Freeman (United States) Pixie Lamm	(United States) Patricia Cody (United States) Ann Lebedeff (United States) Kristien Kemmer (United States) Peggy Michel
28 Apr	Sabadell International; Madrid, Spain; Clay; Singles - Doubles	(Argentina) Anna-Maria Cavadini; 6–3, retd.	(Argentina) Raquel Giscafré		

=== May ===
Ended	Tournament	Winner	Finalist	Semi finalist	Quarter finalist
1 May.	Northern California Championships; Golden Gate Park Courts; San Francisco, United States; Hard; Singles - Doubles	(United States) Marcie Louie; 3–6, 6–2, 6–3	(United States) Farel Footman	(United States) Barbara Downs (United States) Kate Latham	(United States) Diane Brooks (United States) Peggy Michel (United States) Pat Parsons (United States) Pat Polenske
3 May.	British Hard Court Open Championships; The West Hants Club; Bournemouth, Great Britain; Clay; Singles - Doubles	(Australia) Margaret Court; 5–7, 6–4, 6–4	(United Kingdom) Winnie Shaw	(United States) Julie Heldman (United Kingdom) Virginia Wade	(Australia) Lesley Bowrey (United States) Rosie Casals (Australia) Karen Krantzcke (United Kingdom) Joyce Williams
3 May.	River Plate Championships; Buenos Aires Lawn Tennis Club; Buenos Aires, Argentina; Clay; Singles - Doubles	(Argentina) Beatriz Araujo; 6–4, 6–2	(Argentina) Elvira Weisenberger		
4 May	Atlanta Invitational; Atlanta, United States; Clay; Singolare - Doubles	(United States) Nancy Richey; 7–5, 6–2	(United States) Linda Tuero	(United States) Carol Aucamp (United States) Stephanie DeFina	
4 May	California State Championships; Portola Valley, United States; Hard; Singles - Doubles	(United States) Denise Carter; 6–4, 6–3	(United States) Betty Ann Grubb	(South Africa) Esmé Emmanuel (United States) Farel Footman	(United States) Barbara Downs (United States) Kate Latham (United States) Ceci Martinez (United States) Eliza Pande
4 May	City of Naples Cup; Naples, Italy; Clay; Singles - Doubles	(France) Gail Chanfreau; 6–4, 6–2	(South Africa) Laura Rossouw	(Australia) Helen Gourlay (Italy) Maria Teresa Riedl	(Ecuador) María Guzmán (Italy) Monique Salfati-Di Maso (Brazil) Suzana Petersen (Sweden) Christina Sandberg
4 May	Japan Pro Series Nagoya; Nagoya, Japan; Singles - $8000 Doubles	(United Kingdom) Ann Haydon Jones; 6–3, 6–1	(France) Françoise Dürr		
4 May	Stuttgart International; Stuttgart, West Germany; Clay; Singles - Doubles	(United States) Peaches Bartkowicz; 6–4, 6–3	(West Germany) Helga Niessen Masthoff	(West Germany) Heide Orth (Canada) Faye Urban	(United States) Julie Anthony (United States) Marilyn Aschner (West Germany) Kerstin Seelbach (United States) Alice Tym
9 May	Japan Pro Series Osaka; Osaka Municipal Gymnasium; Osaka, Japan; Singles - $8000 Doubles	(United Kingdom) Ann Haydon Jones; 6–2, 2–0 retd	(France) Françoise Dürr		
10 May	Surrey Hard Court Championships; Guildford, Great Britain; Clay; Singles - Doubles	(Australia) Kerry Melville; 6–3, 7–5	(Australia) Margaret Court	(United States) Tory Ann Fretz (Australia) Judy Tegart	(United States) Mary-Ann Eisel (South Africa) Maryna Godwin (Australia) Lesley Hunt (Rhodesia) Pat Walkden
10 May	Droitwich Open Hard Courts; Droitwich Tennis Club; Droitwich Spa, Great Britain; Clay; Singles - Doubles	(United Kingdom) Janice Townsend; 7–5, 4–6, 6–4	(South Africa) Brenda Kirk		
11 May	Torneo Internazionale Reggio Emilia; Circolo Tennis Reggio Emilia; Reggio Emilia, Italy; Clay; Singles - Doubles	(United States) Peaches Bartkowicz; 6–0, 6–1	(Brazil) Suzana Petersen	(France) Gail Chanfreau (Australia) Helen Gourlay	(Italy) Maria Nasuelli (Italy) Graziela Perna (Netherlands) Judith Salomé (Sweden) Christina Sandberg
12 May	Southern California Sectional Championships; Los Angeles Tennis Club; Los Angeles, United States; Hard; Singles - Doubles	(United States) Janet Newberry; 6–2, 6–4	(United States) Valerie Ziegenfuss	(United States) Betty Ann Grubb (United States) Ann Lebedeff	(United States) Pamela Austin (United States) Patricia Cody (United States) Kristien Kemmer (United States) Mary Struthers
17 May	Belgian International Open; Brussels Lawn Tennis Club; Brussels, Belgium; Clay – $ $10,000; Singles - Doubles	(United Kingdom) Ann Haydon Jones; 6–4, 6–0	(United States) Rosie Casals	(France) Rosie Darmon (France) Francoise Durr	(France) Gail Chanfreau (Australia) Lesley Hunt (United Kingdom) Frances Taylor (Argentina) Mabel Vranovich
17 May	BP London Hard Court Championships; Hurlingham Club; Hurlingham, Great Britain; Clay; Singles - Doubles	(Australia) Margaret Court; 7–5, 6–1	(United States) Mary-Ann Eisel	(United States) Peaches Bartkowicz (United States) Julie Heldman	(United States) Tory Ann Fretz (Australia) Judy Tegart (Australia) Fay Moore (United Kingdom) Christine Truman Janes
18 May	Spanish Open (also valid as Condo Godo Trophy); Barcelona, Spain; Clay; Singles - Doubles	(Australia) Kerry Melville; 5–7, 6–4, 7–5	(Australia) Helen Gourlay	(Australia) Lesley Bowrey (Australia) Karen Krantzcke	(South Africa) Maryna Godwin (United States) Kristy Pigeon (South Africa) Laura Rossouw (Australia) Margaret Starr
18 May	Glenwood Manor National Invitational; Glenwood Manor Motel; Overland Park, United States; Hard; Singles - Doubles	(United States) Betty Ann Grubb; 6–4, 6–2	(United States) Karen Susman	(United States) Carol Aucamp (United States) Emilie Burrer	(United States) Denise Carter (South Africa) Esmé Emmanuel (United States) Ceci Martinez (United States) Pam Richmond
18 May	Salzburg International; Salzburger Tennisclub; Salzburg, Austria; Clay; Singles - Doubles	(Austria) Trude Schonberger; 7–5, 7–5	(United States) Nancy Falkenberg		
18 May	Bay Counties Invitation; San Francisco, United States; Hard; Singles - Doubles	(United States) Eliza Pande; 6–2, 6–1	(United States) Marcie Louie	(United States) Barbara Downs (United States) Sharon Walsh	
19 May	Leverkusen International; TC Rot-Weiss Leverkusen; Leverkusen, West Germany; Clay; Singles - Doubles	(West Germany) Helga Niessen; 5–7, 6–4, 7–5	(Czechoslovakia) Alena Palmeova	(West Germany) Heide Orth (United States) Alice Tym	(United States) Julie Anthony (Czechoslovakia) Jaroslava Kunstfeldova (West Germany) Almut Sturm (Canada) Faye Urban
24 May	Rothmans Invitation Hard Court Championships; Connaught Club; Chingford, Great Britain; Clay; Singles - Doppio	(United Kingdom) Corinne Molesworth; 3–6, 6–2, 6–4	(United Kingdom) Shirley Brasher	(United Kingdom) Christine Truman Janes (United Kingdom) Robin Lloyd	(United Kingdom) Judy Congdon (Australia) Faye Moore (United Kingdom) Janice Townsend (Rhodesia) Pat Walkden
25 May	Federation Cup; Athens Tennis Club; Athens, Greece; Clay; 20 nations knockout	United States	Australia	Great Britain; Netherlands	France; Czechoslovakia; West Germany; Italy
26 May	West Berlin Open; West Berlin, West Germany; Clay; Singles - Doubles	(Australia) Karen Krantzcke; 6–1, 6–2	(Australia) Lesley Bowrey	(United States) Mary-Ann Curtis (Australia) Helen Gourlay	(United States) Kristy Pigeon (South Africa) Laura Rossouw (Australia) Janet Young (United States) Val Ziegenfuss
31 May	Surrey Grass Court Championships; Surbiton, Great Britain; Grass; Singles - Doubles	(United States) Mary-Ann Curtis; 4–6, 6–4, 8–6	(Australia) Judy Tegart-Dalton	(United Kingdom) Winnie Shaw (United Kingdom) Joyce Williams	(United States) Patti Hogan (United Kingdom) Christine Truman Janes (Netherlands) Betty Stöve (United Kingdom) Nell Truman
31 May	St. Annes Open; St Anne's on Sea, Great Britain; Grass; Singles - Doubles	(United Kingdom) Robin Lloyd; 6–4, 7–5	(Canada) Faye Urban	(United Kingdom) E. Armstrong (United Kingdom) Janice Townsend	(United Kingdom) G Armstrong (Canada) Jane O'Hara (Canada) Janice Tindle (Rhodesia) Joan Walker
31 May	Glamorgan Championships; Cardiff, Great Britain; Grass; Singles - Doubles	(Brazil) Suzana Petersen; 7–5, 5–7, 6–4	(United Kingdom) Elizabeth Ernest	(New Zealand) Cecilie Fleming (New Zealand) Beverly Vercoe	(Spain) Maria-Jose Aubet (Netherlands) Ada Bakker (United Kingdom) Suzy Beames (United Kingdom) Joanne Haye

=== June ===
Ended	Tournament	Winner	Finalist	Semi finalist	Quarter finalist
1 Jun	Internationales Bremer Turnier; Bremen, West Germany; Clay; Singles - Doubles	(West Germany) Heide Orth; 0–6, 6–3, 6–4	(West Germany) Helga Niessen Masthoff	(West Germany) Inga Bielefeld (West Germany) Regina Kawohl	
1 Jun	Internationales Turnier Zell am See; Zell am See, Austria; Clay; Singles - Doubles	(Austria) Trude Schonberger; 7–5, 7–5	(United States) Nancy Falkenberg		
1 Jun	Leaside Invitation; Leaside Tennis Club; Toronto, Canada; Clay; Singles - Doubles	(Canada) Vivienne Strong; 2–6, 6–2, 6–1	(Canada) Benita Senn	(Canada) Penny Sparling (Canada) Inge Weber	
1 Jun	Tulsa Invitation (12th ed); Tulsa Tennis Club; Tulsa, United States; Clay; Singles - Doubles	(United States) Betty Ann Grubb; 6–1, 6–1	(United States) Vicky Rogers	(United States) Kathy Kraft (United States) Janet Newberry	(United States) Emilie Burrer (United States) Connie Capozzi (South Africa) Esmé Emmanuel (United States) Ceci Martinez
1 Jun	Connecticut State Championships; New Haven, United States; Grass; Singles - Doubles	(United States) Louise Gonnerman; 6–4, 4–6, 6–4	(United States) Carol Hunter	(United States) Justine Butler (United States) Kay Hubbell	(United States) Ann Murphy (United States) Margery Rowbotham (United States) Donna Stockton
1 Jun	U.S. Hard Court Championships; Sacramento, United States; Hard; Singles - Doubles	(United States) Eliza Pande; 7–5, 6–4	(United States) Kristien Kemmer	(United States) Carole Graebner (United States) Kate Latham	(United States) Toni Chaffin (United States) Farel Footman (United States) Gail Hansen (United States) Marlene Muench
7 Jun	Lowther Open; Barnes, Great Britain; Grass; Singles - Doubles	(United Kingdom) Corinne Molesworth; 6–4, 7–5	(United Kingdom) Shirley Brasher	(United Kingdom) Jill Cooper (United Kingdom) Wendy Hall	(United Kingdom) Lindsey Beaven (United Kingdom) Veronica Burton (United Kingdom) Lorna Cawthorn (New Zealand) Cecilie Fleming
7 Jun	Toronto Cricket Club Invitational; Toronto CC; Toronto, Canada; Grass; Singles - Doubles	(Canada) Louise Brown; 6–1, 8–6	(Canada) Benita Senn	(Canada) Penny Sparling (Canada) Inge Weber	
7 Jun	Avenue Havant Open Tournament; Avenue LTC; Havant, Great Britain; Grass; Singles - Doubles	(United Kingdom) Susan Tutt; 8–6, 7–5	(United States) Dorothy Head Knode	(Argentina) Anna María Arías (United Kingdom) Jean Rickson	
7 Jun	East Gloucestershire Championships; Cheltenham, Great Britain; Grass; Singles - Doubles	(United Kingdom) Nell Truman; 2–6, 6–3, 6–2	(Australia) Kerry Harris	(United Kingdom) Janice Townsend (Canada) Faye Urban	(United Kingdom) Elizabeth Ernest (Australia) Wendy Gilchrist (South Africa) Brenda Kirk (United Kingdom) Robin Lloyd
7 Jun	Northern Championships; Northern LTC; Manchester, Great Britain; Grass; Singles - Doubles	(United States) Mary-Ann Curtis; 6-4 6-4	(United States) Patti Hogan	(United Kingdom) Winnie Shaw (United States) Valerie Ziegenfuss	(South Africa) Esmé Emmanuel (United States) Tory Ann Fretz (United States) Stephanie Grant (United States) Kristy Pigeon
7 Jun	French Open Consolation; Paris, France; Clay; Singles - Doubles	(United Kingdom) Virginia Wade; 0–6, 6–3, 6–4	(France) Janine Lieffrig	(France) Odile de Roubin (France) Anne-Marie Rouchon	(Indonesia) Lany Kaligis (Indonesia) Lita Liem (Argentina) Graciela Morán (Australia) Janet Young
8 Jun	Bielefeld International; Bielefeld, West Germany; Singles - Doubles	(West Germany) Helga Niessen Masthoff; 6-3 6-0	(South Africa) Laura Rossouw	(West Germany) Heide Orth (United States) Alice Tym	(Australia) Helen Amos (Belgium) Ingrid Loeys (Australia) Carol Sherriff (Socialist Federal Republic of Yugoslavia) Irena Skulj
8 Jun	French Open; Stade Roland Garros; Paris, France; Clay; Singles - Doubles	(Australia) Margaret Smith Court; 6–1, 4–6, 6–3	(United Kingdom) Ann Haydon Jones	(Australia) Lesley Bowrey (United States) Nancy Richey	(United States) Rosie Casals (United States) Billie Jean King (United States) Julie Heldman (Australia) Kerry Reid
8 Jun	French Open; Stade Roland Garros; Paris, France; Clay; Singles - Doubles	(France) Françoise Dürr (United Kingdom) Ann Haydon Jones; 6–0, 4–6, 7–5	(Australia) Margaret Smith Court (United States) Nancy Richey	(Australia) Lesley Bowrey (United States) Nancy Richey	(United States) Rosie Casals (United States) Billie Jean King (United States) Julie Heldman (Australia) Kerry Reid
9 Jun	New York State Championships; Mamaroneck, United States; Clay; Singles - Doubles	(United States) Marjorie Gengler; 6–1, 6–1	(United States) Pat Stewart	(United States) Louise Gonnerman (United States) Diane Matzner	(United States) Sylvia Hooks (United States) Mimi Kanarek (United States) Nadine Netter (United States) Jade Schiffman
14 Jun	Wills West of England Open; Bristol, Great Britain; Grass; Singles - Doubles	(Australia) Margaret Smith Court; 6–3, 6–3	(United States) Billie Jean King	(Australia) Judy Dalton (United Kingdom) Virginia Wade	(Australia) Lesley Bowrey (France) Françoise Dürr (United States) Rosie Casals (United Kingdom) Ann Haydon Jones
14 Jun	Kent Championships; Beckenham, Great Britain; Grass; Singles - Doubles	(United States) Denise Carter; 6–3, 7–5	(Australia) Kerry Melville	(United Kingdom) Winnie Shaw (United States) Mary Ann Curtis	(Australia) Helen Gourlay (United States) Patti Hogan (Soviet Union) Olga Morozova (Rhodesia) Pat Walkden
14 Jun	John Player Nottingham Tennis Tournament; Nottingham, Great Britain; Singles - Doubles	(United Kingdom) Christine Truman Janes; 6–4, 6–2	(United Kingdom) Nell Truman	(Australia) Kerry Harris (Canada) Faye Urban	(United States) Julie Anthony (United Kingdom) Sally Holdsworth (Canada) Jane O'Hara (Netherlands) Tine Zwaan
15 Jun	Moroccan International Championships; Casablanca, Morocco; Clay; Singles - Doubles	(United States) Alice Tym; 6–3, 6–1	(Argentina) Graciela Moran	(Australia) Ann Phillips-Moore (France) Évelyne Terras	(Greece) Carol -Ann Kalogeropoulos (Italy) Maria Nasuelli (Chile) Michelle Rodriguez (Australia) Carol Sherriff
15 Jun	Alabama State Championships; Mobile, Alabama, United States; Hard; Singles - Doubles	(United States) Emilie Burrer; 6–1, 6–1	(United States) Peggy Moore	(United States) Ann Moore (United States) Becky Vest	
15 Jun	Middle States Clay Court Championships; Du Pont Country Club; Wilmington, United States; Clay; Singles - Doubles	(United States) Chris Beck; 6–3, 2–6, 6–1	(United States) Gretchen Vosters	(United States) Charlotte Atwater (United States) Linda Rupert	(United States) Judy Clay (United States) Joan Keller (United States) Joan Mylchreest (United States) Cynthia Tudor
17 Jun	North Coast Championships; Grafton, Australia; Grass; Singles - Doubles	(Australia) Evonne Goolagong; 7–5. 6–3	(Australia) Patricia Edwards		
21 Jun	Rothmans London Grass Court Open; London, Great Britain; Grass; Singles - Doubles	(United Kingdom) Ann Haydon Jones; 6–0, 6–1	(United Kingdom) Winnie Shaw	(United States) Mary Ann Curtis (France) Francoise Durr	(South Africa) Esmé Emmanuel (Soviet Union) Olga Morozova (United States) Kristy Pigeon (Japan) Kazuko Sawamatsu
21 Jun	Worcestershire Grass Court Championships; Malvern, Great Britain; Grass; Singles - Doubles	(United Kingdom) Lesley Charles; 8–6, 7–5	(United Kingdom) Judy Davies	(Canada) Vicky Berner (United Kingdom) Sheila Moodie	
21 Jun	Intercollegiate Championships; Northfield, United States; Hard; Singles - Doubles	(United States) Emilie Burrer; 6–1, 6–1	(United States) Pam Richmond	(United States) Pixie Lamm (United States) Diane Matzner	(United States) Pam Austin (United States) Carolyn Clarke (United States) Ginger Pfeiffer (United States) Vicky Thomas
21 Jun	Eastern Clay Court Championships; Mamaroneck, United States; Clay; Singles - Doubles	(United States) Nadine Netter; 6–1, 3–6, 7–5	(United States) Louise Gonnerman		
28 Jun	Long Island Clay Court Championships; Port Washington, United States; Clay; Singles - Doubles	(United States) Marjorie Gengler; 6–4, 4–6, 7–5	(United States) Louise Gonnerman	(United States) Sylvia Hooks (United States) Sylvia Price	(United States) Patricia Cody (United States) Elfie Carroll (United States) Diane Matzner (United States) Vija Tamuzs

=== July ===
Ended	Tournament	Winner	Finalist	Semi finalist	Quarter finalist
1 Jul	Southern Championships; Birmingham, United States; Clay; Singles - Doubles	(United States) Connie Capozzi; 6–1, 6–2	(United States) Patricia Adams	(United States) Peggy Moore (United States) Becky Vest	(United States) Laura duPont (United States) Dena Garcia (United States) Pat Garcia (Mexico) Patricia Montaño
5 Jul.	Wimbledon Championships; AELTC; London, Great Britain; Grass; Singles - Doubles	(United Kingdom) Ann Haydon Jones; 3–6, 6–3, 6–2	(United States) Billie Jean King	(United States) Rosie Casals (Australia) Margaret Court	(Australia) Lesley Bowrey (United States) Julie Heldman (United States) Nancy Richey (Australia) Judy Tegart
5 Jul.	Wimbledon Championships; AELTC; London, Great Britain; Grass; Singles - Doubles	(Australia) Margaret Court (Australia) Judy Tegart; 9–7, 6–2	(United States) Patti Hogan (United States) Peggy Michel	(United States) Rosie Casals (Australia) Margaret Court	(Australia) Lesley Bowrey (United States) Julie Heldman (United States) Nancy Richey (Australia) Judy Tegart
5 Jul.	Tennessee Valley Invitational; Chattanooga, United States; Hard; Singles - Doubles	(United States) Linda Tuero; 6–2, 6–0	(Uruguay) Fiorella Bonicelli	(United States) Laura duPont (United States) Jade Schiffman	(Mexico) Lourdes Diaz (United States) Alice De Rochemont (Mexico) Cecilia Rosado (United States) Ann Templeton
5 Jul.	All England Plate; AELTC; London, Great Britain; Grass; Singles - Doubles	(United States) Betty Ann Grubb; 6–3, 4–6, 6–4	(South Africa) Laura Rossouw	(Soviet Union) Marina Chuvirina (United Kingdom) Janice Townsend	(United Kingdom) Sally Holdsworth (United States) Patti Hogan (United Kingdom) Corinne Molesworth (Indonesia) Lita Liem
5 Jul.	Travemünde International (18th ed); Travemünder THC; Travemünde, West Germany; Clay; Singles - Doubles	(West Germany) Helga Niessen; 7–5, 6–2	(West Germany) Kora Schediwy	(West Germany) Katja Ebbinghaus (West Germany) Almut Sturm	(West Germany) Karin De Laporte (West Germany) Margot Schultze (Australia) Carol Sherriff (West Germany) Edith Winkens
12 Jul	East of England Championships; Felixstowe LTC; Felixstowe, Great Britain; Grass; Singles - Doubles	(South Africa) Anita van Deventer; 6–2, 6–4	(South Africa) Brenda Kirk	(South Africa) Marianne Brummer (United Kingdom) Robin Lloyd	(United States) Roylee Bailey (New Zealand) Marilyn Headifen (Australia) Sue Hole (South Africa) Joan Wilshere
12 Jul	Midland Counties Championships; Edgbaston, Great Britain; Grass; Singles - Doubles	(United Kingdom) Janice MacFarlane; 6–2, 6–4	(United Kingdom) Kate Tillin		
12 Jul	Cheshire Championships; Brooklands, Great Britain; Grass; Singles - Doubles	(Brazil) Suzana Petersen; 6–2, 6–4	(United Kingdom) Jean Wilson	(United Kingdom) Rita Bentley (United States) Kathy Blake	
12 Jul	Balkan Games (team); Istanbul, Turkey; Clay	Romania (1st)	Yugoslavia (2nd)	Greece (3rd); Turkey (4th)	
12 Jul	Carroll's Irish Open; Fitzwilliam LTC; Dublin, Eire; Grass; Singles - Doubles	(United States) Billie Jean King; 6–2, 6–2	(United Kingdom) Virginia Wade	(United States) Rosie Casals (Australia) Judy Tegart	(Australia) Helen Amos (United Kingdom) Veronica Burton (Australia) Karen Krantzcke (Australia) Kerry Melville
12 Jul	Sunderland and Durham Open Championships; Durham, Great Britain; Grass; Singles - Doubles	(United Kingdom) Elizabeth Graham; 3–6, 6–3, 6–2	(United Kingdom) Jill Hunter		
12 Jul	Scottish Championships; Edinburgh, Great Britain; Grass; Singles - Doubles	(United Kingdom) Marjorie Love; 6–2, 6–2	(United Kingdom) Sheila Moodie	(United Kingdom) Fiona Campbell (South Africa) Joyce Landsman	(United Kingdom) J M Grant (United Kingdom) Diane McNeil (United Kingdom) Vicky McLennan (United Kingdom) Wendy Slaughter
12 Jul	Welsh Championships; Newport Athletic Club; Newport, Great Britain; Grass; Singles - Doubles	(Australia) Margaret Court; 6–4, 6–4	(United Kingdom) Winnie Shaw	(United States) Mary Ann Curtis (Rhodesia) Pat Walkden	(Australia) Wendy Gilchrist (United Kingdom) Elizabeth Ernest (South Africa) Maryna Proctor (United Kingdom) Joyce Williams
13 Jul	Düsseldorf International; Düsseldorf, West Germany; Clay; Singles - Doubles	(West Germany) Helga Niessen Masthoff; 6–4, 8–6	(West Germany) Edda Buding	(West Germany) Helga Hosl (Australia) Carol Sherriff	(West Germany) Inga Bielefeld (Australia) Helen Gourlay (South Africa) Laura Rossouw (West Germany) Almut Sturm
13 Jul	Swedish Championships; Båstad, Sweden; Clay; Singles - Doubles	(United States) Peaches Bartkowicz; 5–7, 6–4, 6–2	(Sweden) Christina Sandberg	(Sweden) Eva Lundqvist (Sweden) Margareta Strandberg	(Norway) Ellen Grindvold (Italy) Monique Di Maso (Soviet Union) Olga Morozova (Japan) Kazuko Sawamatsu
13 Jul	La Jolla Championships; La Jolla, United States; Hard; Singles - Doubles	(United States) Mary Struthers; 4–6, 6–1, 6-2	(United States) Marita Redondo	(United States) Dodo Bundy Cheney (United States) Barbara Grubb	(United States) Denise Bradshaw (United States) Chris Mattson (United States) Anita Platte (United States) Darlene Roberts
13 Jul	U.S. National Amateur Tennis Championships; Rochester, United States; Clay; Singles - Doubles	(United States) Linda Tuero; 4–6, 6–1, 6-2	(United States) Gwen Thomas	(United States) Emilie Burrer (United States) Patricia Cody	(United States) Carolyn Clarke (United States) Louise Gonnerman (United States) Bonnie Logan (United States) Pam Richmond
13 Jul	Centropa Cup (singles) (Central European U23 Championship); Siófok, Hungary; Clay	(Netherlands) Ada Bakker; 6–2, 6–3	(Hungary) Katalin Borka	(Switzerland) Marianne Kindler (Hungary) Judith Szorenyi	(West Germany) Helga Buche (West Germany) Katja Ebbinghaus (Czechoslovakia) Miroslava Holubova (Poland) Barbara Krall
13 Jul	Centropa Cup (team) (Central European U23 Championship); Krynica, Poland; Clay	Germany (1st)	Netherlands (2nd)	Hungary (3rd); Czechoslovakia (4th)	Austria; Poland; Switzerland
13 Jul	Mountain View Tennis Tournament; Mountain View, United States; Hard; Singles - Doubles	(United States) Tina Lyman; 7–5, 4–6, 6–0	(United States) Marlene Muench	(United States) Carol Gay (United States) June Gay	(United States) Carole Graebner (United States) Barbara Hultgren (United States) Patty Polenski
19 Jul	Rothmans Invitation Eastbourne; Devonshire Park; Eastbourne, Great Britain; Grass; Singles - Doubles	(Australia) Karen Krantzcke; 6–0, 9–7	(United States) Betty Ann Grubb	(Netherlands) Betty Stöve (Australia) Judy Tegart	(Australia) Helen Gourlay (United States) Patti Hogan (United Kingdom) Winnie Shaw (Netherlands) Judith Salomé
19 Jul	Essex Championships; Frinton-on-Sea, Great Britain; Grass; Singles - Doubles	(Australia) Margaret Court; 6–2, 4–6, 6–4	(Rhodesia) Pat Walkden	(United Kingdom) Robin Lloyd (Brazil) Suzana Petersen	(United Kingdom) Veronica Burton (United Kingdom) Wendy Hall (South Africa) Brenda Kirk (South Africa) Wendy Tomlinson
20 Jul	Golden Racket Trophy; Country Club Aixois; Aix-en-Provence, France; Clay; Singles - Doubles	(United Kingdom) Ann Haydon Jones; 6–1, 6–1	(France) Françoise Dürr	(Japan) Junko Sawamatsu (Japan) Kazuko Sawamatsu	(United Kingdom) Frances MacLennan (France) Margurite Mosgofian (France) Odile de Roubin (France) Christiane Spinoza
20 Jul	Western Championships; Cincinnati Tennis Club; Cincinnati, United States; Clay; Singles - Doubles	(Australia) Lesley Turner Bowrey; 1–6, 7–5, 10–10 ret.	(France) Gail Chanfreau	(United States) Linda Tuero (United States) Valerie Ziegenfuss	(United States) Emilie Burrer (United States) Pam Richmond (Mexico) Yola Ramírez (United States) Kristien Kemmer
20 Jul	Montana Invitational; Montana, Switzerland; Clay; Singles - Doubles	(Australia) Lesley Hunt; 6–3 4–6 6–3	(South Africa) Esme Emmanuel	(United States) Kristy Pigeon (Hungary) Erzsebet Polgar	(Argentina) Raquel Giscafré (United States) Cecilia Martinez (Switzerland) Fran Oschwald (Australia) Carol Sherriff
20 Jul	Nuremberg International; Nuremberg, West Germany; Clay; Singles - Doubles	(West Germany) Helga Niessen Masthoff; 6–3 6–1	(West Germany) Almut Sturm	(West Germany) Edda Buding (West Germany) Suzana Korpas	
20 Jul	Le Touquet International Championship; Le Touquet, France; Clay; Singles - Doubles	(Chile) Ana María Arias; 8–10, 6–2, 6–4	(France) Janine Lieffrig	(United States) Dottie Head Knode (France) Sylvie Rual	(France) Josette Billaz (South Africa) Anita van Deventer (Japan) Kimiyo Hatanaka (Brazil) Gabriela Schroeder
20 Jul	Rothmans Open North of England Championships; Hoylake, Great Britain; Grass; Singles - Doubles	(United Kingdom) Virginia Wade; 0–6 6–4 8–6	(United Kingdom) Christine Truman Janes	(United Kingdom) Nell Truman (United Kingdom) Joyce Williams	(Netherlands) Ada Bakker (Australia) Fay Moore (South Africa) Maryna Proctor (Netherlands) Astrid Suurbeck
21 Jul	Czechoslovakian National Championships; Ostrava, Czechoslovakia; Clay; Singles - Doubles	(Czechoslovakia) Alena Palmeova; 6–2, 6–2	(Czechoslovakia) Marie Neumanová	(Czechoslovakia) Miroslava Holubova (Czechoslovakia) Vlasta Vopickova	
21 Jul	Belgian National Hard Court Championships; Brussels, Belgium; Clay; Singles - Doubles	(Belgium) Ingrid Loeys; 6–1, 7–5	(Belgium) Michele Kahn Rotta	(Belgium) Micheline Five (Belgium) Monique Van Haver	(Belgium) Monique Bedoret (Belgium) Nicole Ottn (Belgium) Chantal Van Gheluwe (Belgium) Lisette Sliepen
27 Jul	Swiss Open; Gstaad, Switzerland; Clay; Singles - Doubles	(France) Françoise Dürr; 6–4 4–6 6–2	(United States) Rosie Casals	(United Kingdom) Ann Haydon Jones (Italy) Lea Pericoli	(Ecuador) María Guzmán (Australia) Lesley Hunt (United States) Billie Jean King (United States) Kristy Pigeon
27 Jul	U.S. Clay Court Championships; Indianapolis, United States; Clay; Singles - Doubles	(France) Gail Chanfreau; 6–2, 6–2	(United States) Linda Tuero	(Australia) Lesley Bowrey (United States) Nancy Richey	(United States) Tish Adams (Uruguay) Fiorella Bonicelli (United States) Louise Gonnerman (Australia) Kerry Harris
27 Jul	La Coruña Internacional; La Coruña Tennis Club; La Coruña, Spain; Clay; Singles - Doubles	(Uruguay) Fiorella Bonicelli; 5–7, 6–2, 6–1	(France) Jacqueline Venturino		
29 Jul	Bavarian Open; Munich, West Germany; Singles - Doubles	(Australia) Karen Krantzcke; 6–8, 6–2, 6–1	(West Germany) Helga Hösl	(West Germany) Helga Niessen (Japan) Kazuko Sawamatsu	(West Germany) Edda Buding (West Germany) Katja Ebbinghaus (West Germany) Kora Schediwy (West Germany) Almut Sturm
29 Jul	ATA National Championships; Saint Louis, United States; Clay; Singles - Doubles	(United States) Bonnie Logan ?	(United States) ?		
31 Jul	Danish Outdoor Championships; Copenhagen, Denmark; Clay; Singles - Doubles	(Denmark) Mari Ann Bloch Jorgensen; 6–2, 6–0	(Denmark) L Kornum		

=== August ===
Ended	Tournament	Winner	Finalist	Semi finalist	Quarter finalist
2 Aug	Northumberland Open Championships; Newcastle upon Tyne, Great Britain; Grass; Singles - Doubles	(Australia) Wendy Gilchrist; 7–5, 6–2	(South Africa) Joan Wilshere	(United Kingdom) Rita Bentley (United Kingdom) Marilyn Headifen	
2 Aug	Tunbridge Wells Open; Tunbridge Wells, Great Britain; Grass; Singles - Doubles	(United Kingdom) Lindsay Beaven; 6–2, 8–6	(United Kingdom) Belinda Orchard	(United Kingdom) Alison Fraser Black (United Kingdom) Jackie Fayter	(United Kingdom) Lesley Charles (United Kingdom) Mrs M D Furniss (United Kingdom) Averil Morris (United Kingdom) Jenny Stapleton
2 Aug	Canadian National Championships; Toronto, Canada; Clay; Singles - Doubles	(Canada) Faye Urban; 6–3, 6–2	(Canada) Andrée Martin	(Canada) Susan Eager (Canada) Jane O'Hara	(Canada) Louise Brown (Canada) Benita Senn (Canada) Janice Tindle (Canada) Inge Weber
3 Aug	Eastern Grass Court Championships; South Orange, United States; Grass; Singles - Doubles	(United States) Patti Hogan; 6–3, 3–6, 6–4	(United States) Kristy Pigeon	(United States) Betty Ann Grubb (United States) Val Ziegenfuss	(United States) Denise Carter (United States) Mary Ann Curtis (Australia) Kerry Harris (United States) Linda Tuero
3 Aug	Netherlands International Open; Hilversum, Netherlands; Clay; Singles - Doubles	(Australia) Kerry Melville; 6–2, 3–6, 6–3	(Australia) Karen Krantzcke	(Netherlands) Trudy Groenman (South Africa) Pat Walkden	(Australia) Lesley Hunt (Netherlands) Marijke Schaar (West Germany) Almut Sturm (Czechoslovakia) Vlasta Vopickova
3 Aug	Portuguese International Championships; Lisbon, Portugal; Clay; Singles - Doubles	(Brazil) Suzana Petersen; 6–2, 6–3	(Brazil) Regina Ferreira		
3 Aug	Polish National Championships; Łódź, Poland; Clay; Singles - Doubles	(Poland) Barbara Kral; 6–0, 6–4	(Poland) Danuta Rylska		
3 Aug	Geneva International Championships; Geneva, Switzerland; Clay; Singles - Doubles	(Czechoslovakia) Olga Lendlova; 6–3, 6–3	(Switzerland) Anne-Marie Studer		
3 Aug	Washington State Championships; Seattle, United States; Grass; Singles - Doubles	(United States) Mary Struthers; 6–2, 6–4	(United States) Janet Adkisson	(United States) Patricia Bostrom (United States) Dorothy Cheney	(United States) Barbara Grubb (United States) Jane Carey (United States) Mary Mclean (United States) Jolene Roesler
3 Aug	Maccabiah Games Championships; Tel Aviv, Israel; Clay; Singles - Doubles	(United States) Julie Heldman; 6–1, 6–2; Gold	(United States) Pam Richmond; Silver	(South Africa) Esmé Emmanuel; Bronze (United Kingdom) Sandra Okin; 4th	(United States) Marilyn Aschner (Canada) Vicki Berner (United Kingdom) Veronica Burton (Israel) Tova Epstein
4 Aug	Bad Neuenahr International; Bad Neuenahr-Ahrweiler, West Germany; Clay; Singles - Doubles	(West Germany) Helga Hosl; 5–7, 7–5, 6–4	(West Germany) Helga Niessen	(Japan) Kazuko Sawamatsu (Socialist Federal Republic of Yugoslavia) Irena Škulj	(Argentina) Raquel Giscafré (West Germany) Susanne Korpas (West Germany) Ingrid Kunstfeld (Japan) Junko Sawamatsu
6 Aug	Piping Rock Invitation; Locust Valley, United States; Grass; Singles - Doubles	(Australia) Margaret Court; 6–1, 6–3	(United States) Betty Ann Grubb	(United States) Patti Hogan (United States) Linda Tuero	(United States) Denise Carter (United States) Margie Cooper (Australia) Kerry Harris (South Africa) Brenda Kirk
6 Aug	St. Louis Pro Championships; Dwight Davis Center; St. Louis, United States; Hard – $8,000; Singles - Doubles	(United States) Billie Jean King; 6–1, 6–3	(United States) Rosie Casals	(France) Francoise Durr (United Kingdom) Ann Haydon Jones	
9 Aug	Internazionali di Senigallia; Senigallia, Italy; Clay; Singles - Doubles	(Japan) Kazuko Sawamatsu; 6–3, 6–3	(Sweden) Christina Sandberg	(Greece) Carol-Ann Kalogeropoulos (Argentina) Mabel Vrancovich	(Australia) Helen Amos (Italy) Monique Di Maso (Italy) Anna-Maria Nasuelli (Italy) Sara De Nigris
9 Aug	Suffolk Championships; Framlingham College; Framlingham, Great Britain; Grass; Singles - Doubles	(United Kingdom) Marjorie Love; 1–6, 6–4, 6–2	(Republic of Ireland) Sue Minford		
9 Aug	Ilkley Open; Ilkley LTC; Ilkley, Great Britain; Grass; Singles - Doubles	(United Kingdom) Corinne Molesworth; 4–6, 6–3, 6–3	(Australia) Wendy Gilchrist	(United Kingdom) Rita Bentley (United Kingdom) Sally Holdsworth	
9 Aug	Canadian Open; Toronto, Canada; Clay; Singles - Doubles	(Canada) Faye Urban; 6–2, 6–0	(Canada) Vicki Berner	(Canada) Andrée Martin (United States) Jade Schiffman	(Canada) Louise Brown (Canada) Jane O'Hara (Canada) Benita Senn (Canada) Karen Wills
10 Aug	Masters Pro Championships; Highland Racquet and Riding Club; Binghampton, United States; Hard – $8,000; Singles - Doubles	(United States) Billie Jean King; 10–8, 3–6, 6–4	(United States) Rosie Casals	(France) Francoise Durr (United Kingdom) Ann Haydon Jones	
10 Aug	Tournoi International de Champéry; Champéry, Switzerland; Clay; Singles - Doubles	(Czechoslovakia) Olga Lendlova	(France) Camille Simon	(France) Marielle Lombard (Belgium) Elise Poulet	
10 Aug	British Columbia Open Championships; Vancouver, Canada; Hard; Singles - Doubles	(United States) Dorothy Cheney; 6–4, 8–6	(Canada) Mary Struthers	(United States) Trish Bostrom (United States) Barbara Grubb	(United States) Terry Brassey (United States) Evelyn Houseman (United States) Marilyn Muench (Canada) Inge Weber
11 Aug	West German Open Championships; Hamburg, West Germany; Clay; Singles - Doubles	(Australia) Judy Tegart; 6–3, 6–4	(West Germany) Helga Niessen	(West Germany) Helga Hosl (South Africa) Pat Walkden	(West Germany) Edda Buding Duchtig (South Africa) Maryna Proctor (Czechoslovakia) Vlasta Vopickova (Australia) Kerry Melville
11 Aug	Wightman Cup; Cleveland, Ohio, United States; Hard	United States; 5–2 (rubbers)	Great Britain		
16 Aug.	Winchester Open; Winchester, Great Britain; Grass; Singles - Doubles	(United Kingdom) Belinda Orchard; 7–5, 2–6, 7–5	(United Kingdom) P. Hargrave		
16 Aug.	Cranleigh Open; Cranleigh, Great Britain; Grass; Singles - Doubles	(United Kingdom) Shirley Brasher; 6–2, 3–6, 6–3	(United Kingdom) Belinda Orchard	(United Kingdom) Lorna Cawthorn (United Kingdom) Sandra Okin	
17 Aug.	Pennsylvania Grass Court Open Championships; Haverford, United States; Grass - $5,000; Singles - Doubles	(Australia) Margaret Court; 6–1, 6–0	(United Kingdom) Virginia Wade	(Australia) Lesley Bowrey (United States) Patti Hogan	(Australia) Kerry Harris (United Kingdom) Christine Truman Janes (United States) Wendy Overton (United Kingdom) Joyce Williams
17 Aug.	Moscow International Championships; Moscow, Soviet Union; Clay; Singles - Doubles	(United States) Julie Heldman; 6–3, 2–6, 6–3	(United States) Peaches Bartkowicz	(Soviet Union) Olga Morozova (Czechoslovakia) Marie Neumannová	(Soviet Union) Marina Chuvirina (Soviet Union) Tiiu Kivi (Soviet Union) Maria Kull (West Germany) Ebba Ride
17 Aug.	Netherlands National Championships; Scheveningen, Netherlands; Clay; Singles - Doubles	(Netherlands) Marijke Schaar; 8–6, 6–2	(Netherlands) Tine Zwaan	(Netherlands) Trudy Groenman (Netherlands) Judith Salome	(Netherlands) Ada Bakker (Netherlands) Patricia Went (Netherlands) Astrid Suurbeck (Netherlands) Elsie Veentjer
17 Aug.	Torneo Internazionale di Viareggio; Viareggio, Italy; Clay; Singles - Doubles	(Sweden) Christina Sandberg; 6–0, 8–6	(Italy) Maria Teresa Riedl	(Italy) Alessandra Gobbò (Greece) Carol-Ann Kalogeropoulos	
17 Aug.	Troodos International; Nicosia, Cyprus; Clay; Singles - Doubles	(Israel) Paulina Peisachov; 6–3, 6–1	(Israel) Esther Rosengarten		
17 Aug.	U.S. National Public Parks Championships; Chicago, United States; Hard; Singles - Doubles	(United States) Alice Tym; 6–8, 6–3, 7–5	(United States) Carol Levy	(United States) Pat Cody (United States) Sue Sterrett	(United States) Suzanne Gray (United States) Marilyn Mueller (United States) Anita Platte (United States) Vicki Smouse
18 Aug.	Austrian International Championships; Kitzbühel, Austria; Clay; Singles - Doubles	(Australia) Judy Tegart; 7–5, 6–3	(South Africa) Pat Walkden	(West Germany) Edda Buding Duchting (Australia) Faye Toyne-Moore	(South Africa) Anita van Deventer (Ecuador) María Guzmán (France) Odile de Roubin (Japan) Junko Sawamatsu
18 Aug.	Knokke-Le-Zoute International; Knokke, Belgium; Clay; Singles - Doubles	(Australia) Helen Gourlay; 6–4, 6–4	(South Africa) Maryna Proctor	(Belgium) Michele Kahn (Czechoslovakia) Anna Lenkovska	
18 Aug.	Tournoi d'août du Touquet; Le Touquet, France; Clay; Singles - Doubles	(France) Rosie Darmon; 6–4, 6–4	(France) Anne-Marie Rouchon		
23 Aug	Poland International Championships; Katowice, Poland; Clay; Singles - Doubles	(United States) Peaches Bartkowicz; 6–3, 6–3	(Poland) Daniela Wieczorkowna	(Poland) Maria Dowbór-Lewandowska (Romania) Mirabela Polician	(Spain) Maria Jose Aubet (Poland) Krystyna Filipowna (Poland) Barbara Olszewska (Czechoslovakia) Blanka Politzerova
23 Aug	Exmouth Open; Exmouth, Great Britain; Grass; Singles - Doubles	(United Kingdom) Jill Cooper; 6–4, 3–6, 6–1	(United Kingdom) Rita Bentley	(United Kingdom) Jackie Fayter (United Kingdom) Denise Staniszewski	(United Kingdom) Lindsey Beaven (United Kingdom) Marilyn Bevan (United Kingdom) Marilyn Headifen (United Kingdom) Sharon Mildner
23 Aug	Scottish Hard Court Championships; St Andrews, Great Britain; Clay; Singles - Doubles	(United Kingdom) Marjorie Love; 6–0, 6–1	(United Kingdom) Gwen Armstrong	(United Kingdom) Jackie Fayter (United Kingdom) Denise Staniszewski	
23 Aug	Yugoslavian National Championships; Belgrade, Yugoslavia; Clay; Yugoslavian National Championships - Doubles	(Socialist Federal Republic of Yugoslavia) Irena Škulj; 6–1, 6–1	(Socialist Federal Republic of Yugoslavia) Lena Dvornik	(Socialist Federal Republic of Yugoslavia) Biljana Kostic (Socialist Federal Republic of Yugoslavia) Alenka Pipan	
24 Aug	U.S. National Amateur Tennis Championships; Chestnut Hill, United States; Grass; Singles - Doubles	(Australia) Margaret Court; 4–6, 6–3, 6–0	(United Kingdom) Virginia Wade	(United States) Mary Ann Curtis (Australia) Kerry Melville	(Australia) Lesley Bowrey (United States) Betty Ann Grubb (United Kingdom) Christine Truman Janes (United Kingdom) Joyce Williams
24 Aug	Torneo Internazionale di Ortisei; Ortisei, Italy; Clay; Singles - Doubles	(Italy) Monica Giorgi; 3–6, 6–3, 8–6	(Italy) Maria Teresa Riedl	(Italy) Alessandra Gobbo (Italy) Maria Nasuelli	(Brazil) Maria Cristina Diaz (Greece) Carol-Ann Kalogeropoulos (Italy) Monique Salfati-Di Maso (Sweden) Ulla Sandulf
24 Aug	West German National Outdoor Championships; Stuttgart, West Germany; Clay; Singles - Doubles	(West Germany) Helga Niessen; 6–2, 6–2	(West Germany) Almut Sturm		
25 Aug	Istanbul International Championships; Istanbul, Turkey; Clay; Singles - Doubles	(Rhodesia) Pat Walkden; 6–3, 6–3	(Australia) Fay Toyne-Moore	(South Africa) Maryna Proctor (Australia) Carol Sherriff	(Australia) B Crockford (Turkey) H Celaloglu (Turkey) Rozi Feldman (Turkey) S Ozturetgen
26 Aug	Hungarian International Championships; Budapest, Hungary; Clay; Singles - Doubles	(Australia) Helen Gourlay; 6–4, 6–4	(Soviet Union) Marina Chuvirina	(Hungary) Katalin Borka (Hungary) Klara Bardoczy	(Hungary) Erzsebet Polgar (Bulgaria) Lubka Radkova (Hungary) Erzsebet Szell (Hungary) Judith Szorenyi
26 Aug	Santander International Championships; Santander, Spain; Clay; Singles - Doubles	(United Kingdom) Joan Wilshere; 6–4, 6–4	(Brazil) Mary Habicht	(Spain) Ana María Estalella (Spain) Carmen Bustamante	
30 Aug	Budleigh Salterton Open; Budleigh Salterton, Great Britain; Grass; Singles - Doubles	(United Kingdom) Corinne Molesworth; 6–1, 8–10, 6–1	(United Kingdom) Lindsey Beaven	(United Kingdom) Rita Bentley (Australia) Wendy Gilchrist	(United Kingdom) Judy Congdon (United Kingdom) Jill Griffiths (United Kingdom) Jackie Fayter (United Kingdom) Marilyn Headifen
31 Aug	Sydney Metropolitan Hard Court Championships; Sydney, Australia; Clay; Singles - Doubles	(Australia) Evonne Goolagong; 1–6, 6–4, 6–0	(Australia) Pat Coleman		
31 Aug	Portschach International; Portschach, Austria; Clay; Singles - Doubles	(West Germany) Helga Niessen; 6–4, 4–6, 6–3	(Australia) Helen Gourlay	(Brazil) Suzana Petersen (West Germany) Kora Schediwy	(Argentina) Raquel Giscafré (Ecuador) María Guzmán (Austria) Sonja Pachta (West Germany) Almut Sturm

=== September ===
Ended	Tournament	Winner	Finalist	Semi finalist	Quarter finalist
1 Sep	Vigo International; Vigo, Spain; Clay; Singles - Doubles	(United Kingdom) Joan Wilshere; 2–6, 6–4, 6–4	(Spain) Ana María Estalella		
1 Sep	Santa Monica Open; Santa Monica, United States; Hard; Singles - Doubles	(Australia) Christine Matison; 3–6, 7–5, 6–4	(United States) Janice Metcalf	(United States) Wendy Appleby (United States) Norma Kettenburg	(United States) Erin Dignam (United States) Tracy McNair (United States) Anita Platt (United States) Lea Trumbull
2 Sep	Romanian National Championships; Bucharest, Romania; Clay; Singles - Doubles	(Romania) Judith Dibar; 6–4, 6–4	(Romania) Agnes Kun	(Romania) Julieta Boboc (Romania) Ecaterina Horsa	(Romania) Mariana Ciogolea (Romania) Eleonora Dumitrescu
3 Sep	Brumana International; Brummana, Lebanon; Clay; Singles - Doubles	(Rhodesia) Pat Walkden; 6–3, 3–6, 6–1	(Australia) Faye Moore	(South Africa) Maryna Proctor (Australia) Carol Sherriff	(Lebanon) Lita Akraoui (South Africa) Delaille Hewitt (Lebanon) Renee Khouri (Chile) María Tort
6 Sep	Lee-on-Solent Open; Lee-on-Solent, Great Britain; Clay; Singles - Doubles	(United Kingdom) Lindsey Beaven; 6–2, 7–5	(New Zealand) Beverly Vercoe	(United Kingdom) Penny Hardgrave (United Kingdom) Pepy Munslow	
7 Sep	Heart of America International Championships; Kansas City, United States; Clay; Singles - Doubles	(Australia) Lesley Bowrey; 8–6, 4–6, 7–5	(Australia) Kerry Harris	(United Kingdom) Mary McAnally (United States) Karen Susman	(Colombia) Isabel Fernandez (United States) Mary Hamm (United States) Kathy Harter (South Africa) Laura Rossouw
7 Sep	International Championships of San Sebastian; San Sebastián, Spain; Clay; Singles - Doubles	(Spain) Ana Maria Estalella; 7–6, 6–2	(Spain) Carmen Mandarino	(Romania) Judith Dibar (Brazil) Suzana Petersen	
7 Sep	Malaysian International Championships; Kuala Lumpur, Malaysia; Clay; Singles - Doubles	(Malaysia) Radhika Menon; 5–7, 6–1, 6-2	(Vietnam) Nguyen Thi Gioi	(Singapore) Mrs Philippa Miall (Thailand) Somsri Klamssombuti	
7 Sep	Greek International Championships; Athens, Greece; Clay; Singles - Doubles	(Italy) Anna-Maria Nasuelli; 3–6, 6–4, 6–4	(United Kingdom) Sally Holdsworth	(Argentina) Raquel Giscafré (Brazil) Suzana Petersen	(Spain) Maria-Jose Aubet (Greece) Dion Asteri (Greece) Carol-Ann Kalogeropoulos
8 Sep	Cal-Neva Pro Tennis Tournament; Incline Village, United States; Clay; Singles - Doubles	(United States) Billie Jean King; 6–0, 6–4	(United States) Rosie Casals		
9 Sep	U.S. Open; Forest Hills, United States; Grass; Singles - Doubles	(Australia) Margaret Court; 6–2, 6–2	(United States) Nancy Richey	(United States) Rosie Casals (United Kingdom) Virginia Wade	(United States) Peaches Bartkowicz (United States) Julie Heldman (United States) Billie Jean King (Australia) Karen Krantzcke
9 Sep	U.S. Open; Forest Hills, United States; Grass; Singles - Doubles	(France) Françoise Dürr (United States) Darlene Hard; 0–6, 6–3, 6–4	(Australia) Margaret Court (United Kingdom) Virginia Wade	(United States) Rosie Casals (United Kingdom) Virginia Wade	(United States) Peaches Bartkowicz (United States) Julie Heldman (United States) Billie Jean King (Australia) Karen Krantzcke
14 Sep	Saloniki International; Thessaloniki, Greece; Clay; Singles - Doubles	(United Kingdom) Sally Holdsworth; 6–2, 6–4	(Spain) Maria Jose Aubet	(Greece) Dion Asteri (Greece) Aliki Koutsouri	
14 Sep	Rhodesian International Championships; Bulawayo, Rhodesia; Grass; Singles - Doubles	(Rhodesia) Fiona Morris; 6–1, 9–7	(South Africa) Anita van Deventer	(South Africa) Marianne Brummer (Rhodesia) Cheryle Sayer	
14 Sep	Coupe Bonfiglio; Milan, Italy; Clay; Singles - Doubles	(Finland) Birgitta Lindström; 11–9, 5–7, 6–1	(Brazil) Suzana Petersen	(Argentina) Raquel Giscafré (Netherlands) Judith Salomé	(Australia) Wendy Gilchrist (United Kingdom) Corinne Molesworth (Italy) Anna Polli (Italy) Daniela Porzio
15 Sep	La Costa Invitational; Carlsbad, United States; Hard; Singles - Doubles	(United States) Julie Heldman; 6–4, 6–3	(United States) Peaches Bartkowicz	(Australia) Lesley Hunt (United Kingdom) Winnie Shaw	(France) Gail Sherriff Chanfreau (United States) Darlene Hard (United States) Janet Newberry (United States) Val Ziegenfuss
15 Sep	Yugoslavia International Championships; Belgrade, Yugoslavia; Clay; Singles - Doubles	(Hungary) Erzsébet Széll; 6–4, 6–2	(Socialist Federal Republic of Yugoslavia) Irena Škulj	(West Germany) Edda Buding (Australia) Sandra Walsham	
15 Sep	Iranian International Championships; Tehran, Iran; Clay; Singles - Doubles	(Rhodesia) Pat Walkden; 6–1, 5–7, 6–1	(Australia) Faye Moore	(Lebanon) Lita Akraoui (Peru) Maria Ayala	
20 Sep	Israel International Invitation; Beersheba, Israel; Clay; Singles - Doubles	(United Kingdom) Sally Holdsworth; 4–6, 6–4, 6–1	(Czechoslovakia) Alena Palmeova	(Israel) Tova Epstein (Israel) Tamar Sendik	
21 Sep	European Amateur Championships; Turin, Italy; Clay; Singles - Doubles	(Czechoslovakia) Vlasta Vopickova; 6–4, 6–2	(Czechoslovakia) Marie Neumanová	(Soviet Union) Olga Morozova (Soviet Union) Tiiu Kivi	(Hungary) Katalin Borka (Hungary) Erzsebet Polgar (Switzerland) Anne Marie Studer (Soviet Union) Zaiga Jansone
21 Sep	Figaredo Cup; Oviedo, Spain; Clay; Singles - Doubles	(West Germany) Edda Buding Duchting; 3–6, 6–1, 6–1	(Spain) Carmen Bustamente	(Spain) Ana María Estalella (United Kingdom) Joan Wilshere	
28 Sep	Israel Autumn International; Netanya, Israel; Clay; Singles - Doubles	(United Kingdom) Sally Holdsworth; 3–6, 6–1, 6–3	(Czechoslovakia) Alena Palmeova	(Israel) Tamar Hayat (Israel) Ronit Strulowitz	
28 Sep	Italian National Championships; Verona, Italy; Clay; Singles - Doubles	(Italy) Maria Teresa Riedl; 6–1, 2–6, 6–1	(Italy) Lea Pericoli	(Italy) Lucia Bassi (Italy) Monique Salfati-Di Maso	(Italy) Signorina Chitarin (Italy) Anna-Maria Nasuelli (Italy) Signorina Polli (Italy) Daniela Porzio
28 Sep	Pacific Southwest Open; Los Angeles, United States; Hard; Singles - Doubles	(United States) Billie Jean King; 6–2, 6–3	(United Kingdom) Ann Haydon Jones	(United States) Nancy Richey (United Kingdom) Winnie Shaw	(United States) Rosie Casals (France) Gail Chanfreau (France) Françoise Durr (United States) Darlene Hard
28 Sep	Coupe Marcel Poree; Paris, France; Clay; Singles - Doubles	(France) Odile de Roubin; 3–6, 6–2, 6–1	(France) Claudine Rouire	(France) Christiane Spinoza (France) Évelyne Terras	(West Germany) Ilse Buding (France) Nicole Cazaux (France) Janine Lieffrig (France) Anne-Marie Rouchon

=== October ===
Ended	Tournament	Winner	Finalist	Semi finalist	Quarter finalist
4 Oct	Tel Aviv International; Tel Aviv, Israel; Hard; Singles - Doubles	(Czechoslovakia) Alena Palmeova; 6–4, 6–0	(United Kingdom) Sally Holdsworth	(United Kingdom) Jenny Helliar (Israel) Esther Rosengarten	
5 Oct	Pacific Coast International Open; Santa Monica, United States; Hard; Singles - Doubles	(Australia) Margaret Court; 6–4, 5–7, 6–0	(United Kingdom) Winnie Shaw	(Australia) Lesley Hunt (United States) Patti Hogan	(South Africa) Esmé Emmanuel (United States) Pixie Lamm (United States) Janet Newberry (United States) Eliza Pande
5 Oct	Midland Racquet Club Invitational (men's event called WCT Midland Pro Champs); Midland, United States; Hard; Singles - Doubles	(United States) Billie Jean King; 6–4, 5–7, 6–0	(United States) Rosie Casals	(France) Francoise Durr (United Kingdom) Ann Haydon Jones	
6 Oct	Victorian Hard Court Championships; Melbourne, Australia; Clay; Singles - Doubles	(Australia) Lynne Nette; 6–4, 6-2	(Australia) Janine Whyte	(Australia) Lexie Kenny (Sweden) Christina Sandberg	(Republic of Ireland) Eleanor O'Neill (Australia) Evonne Goolagong (Indonesia) Lita Liem (United Kingdom) Winnie Shaw
6 Oct	National Capital Championships; Manuka, Australia; Hard; Singles - Doubles	(Australia) Evonne Goolagong; 6–1, 6-4	(Australia) Patricia Coleman	(Australia) Trisha Edwards (Australia) Sandra Walsham	(Australia) A. Davies (Australia) P. Hill (United States) Miriam Thornton (Australia) Barbara Walsh
6 Oct	Fairfield Open Hard Courts; Fairfield, Australia; Clay; Singles - Doubles	(Australia) Jan O'Neill; 6–4, 6–4	(Australia) Carol Sherriff	(Australia) Judy Humphries (Australia) Karen Krantzcke	(Australia) Sue Alexander (Australia) Robyn Ebbern (Australia) Jill Emmerson (Australia) Sue Hole
11 Oct	Israel Invitation (also valid as Haifa International); Haifa, Israel; Clay; Singles - Doubles	(United Kingdom) Sally Holdsworth; 6–1, 7–5	(United Kingdom) Jenny Helliar	(United States) Melissa Callaway (Israel) Tamar Hayat	
11 Oct	TFE Foreign Challenge; Honolulu, United States; Hard; Singles - Doubles	(Australia) Helen Amos; 10–8	(Australia) Lesley Hunt	(United States) Alice Tym (Australia) Janet Young	(United States) Stephanie Chillingsworth (United States) Mary Lou Jarrett (United States) Muriel Osborne (United States) Hattie Sommerville
12 Oct.	Ecuadorian National Championships; Quito, Ecuador; Grass; Singles - Doubles	(Ecuador) María Guzmán; 3–6, 6–2, 6–1	(Ecuador) Ana María Ycaza	(Ecuador) Patricia Rivera (Ecuador) Margarita De Zuleta	
12 Oct.	Howard Hughes Open; Las Vegas, United States; Hard; Singles - Doubles	(United States) Nancy Richey; 2–6, 6–4, 6–1	(United States) Billie Jean King	(Australia) Margaret Court (United Kingdom) Ann Haydon Jones	(United States) Rosie Casals (United States) Mary Ann Curtis (France) Francoise Durr (United Kingdom) Winnie Shaw
13 Oct.	French National Championships (tennis); Nice, France; Clay; Singles - Doubles	(France) Gail Chanfreau; 6–0, 6–2	(France) Evelyne Terras	(France) Danièle Bouteleux (France) Odile de Roubin	(France) Janine Lieffrig (France) Anne-Marie Rouchon (France) Christiane Spinoza (France) Jacqueline Vives
18 Oct.	Dewar Cup Perth; Bell's Sports Centre; Perth, Great Britain; Hard (i); Singles - Doubles	(United Kingdom) Virginia Wade; 9–7, 6–2	(United Kingdom) Ann Haydon Jones	(United States) Julie Heldman (South Africa) Annette Du Plooy	(United States) Mary Ann Curtis (Australia) Wendy Gilchrist (United Kingdom) Jenny Heliar (United Kingdom) Joyce Williams
19 Oct.	Spanish National Championships; Madrid, Spain; Clay; Singles - Doubles	(Spain) Ana María Estalella; 4–6, 6–3, 6–4	(Spain) N. Satacana		
19 Oct.	San Diego Metropolitan Tennis Championships; San Diego, United States; Hard; Singles - Doubles	(United States) Marita Redondo; 6–3, 6–4	(United States) Janet Newberry	(United States) Maricaye Christenson (United States) Mary Struthers	(United States) Ann Lebedeff (United States) Peggy Michel (United States) Tam O'Shaughnessy (United States) Anita Platte
19 Oct.	State Center Tennis Tournament; Fresno, United States; Hard; Singles - Doubles	(South Africa) Esmé Emmanuel; 6–4, 1–6, 6–3	(United States) Sharon Walsh	(United States) Denise Carter (United States) Kate Latham	
19 Oct.	Southwestern Open Sectional Championships; Tucson Racquet Club; Tucson, United States; Hard; Singles - Doubles	(United States) Emilie Burrer; 6–1, 1–6, 6–2	(United States) Pam Richmond	(United States) Nancy Neeld (Israel) Paulina Peisachov	(United States) Carolyn Clarke (United States) Carol Coates (United States) Carol Gay (United States) Barbara Wroten
25 Oct.	Dewar Cup Stalybridge; Stalybridge Stadium; Stalybridge, Great Britain; Hard (i); Singles - Doubles	(United Kingdom) Virginia Wade; 6–3, 1–6, 6–3	(United Kingdom) Ann Haydon Jones	(United States) Julie Heldman (United States) Corinne Molesworth	(Australia) Helen Gourlay (United Kingdom) Christine Truman Janes (South Africa) Annette Du Plooy (United Kingdom) Joyce Williams
26 Oct.	Florida State Closed Championships(19th ed); Delray Beach, United States; Clay; Singles - Doubles	(United States) Chris Evert; 6–1, 6–2	(United States) Patti Ann Reese	(United States) Judy Alvarez (United States) Chris Koutras	

=== November ===
Ended	Tournament	Winner	Finalist	Semi finalist	Quarter finalist
1 Nov.	Dewar Cup Aberavon; Afan Lido Sport Center; Aberavon, Great Britain; Carpet (i); Singles - Doubles	(United Kingdom) Virginia Wade; 6–4, 6–4	(United States) Julie Heldman	(South Africa) Annette Du Plooy (United Kingdom) Ann Haydon Jones	(United States) Mary Ann Curtis (Australia) Helen Gourlay (United Kingdom) Nell Truman (United Kingdom) Joyce Williams
2 Nov.	Westwood Indoor Invitation; Westwood Country Club; Richmond, United States; Clay (i); Singles - Doubles	(United States) Peaches Bartkowicz; 6–2, 6–0	(United States) Linda Tuero	(United States) Stephanie Johnson (United States) Val Ziegenfuss	(United States) Laura duPont (United States) Darlene Hard (United States) Carole Herrick (United States) Wendy Overton
2 Nov.	USSR National Championships; Tashkent, Soviet Union; Hard; Singles - Doubles	(Soviet Union) Olga Morozova; 7–5, 6–2	(Soviet Union) Rauza Islanova	(Soviet Union) Galina Baksheeva (Soviet Union) Tiiu Kivi	(Soviet Union) Yevgenyia Izopaitis (Soviet Union) Nina Tukhareli (Soviet Union) Anna Yeremeyeva (Soviet Union) Vera Yushka
2 Nov.	Auckland Hard Court Championships; Auckland, New Zealand; Clay; Singles - Doubles	(New Zealand) Jill Bloxham; 3–6, 6–2, 6–1	(New Zealand) Tup Singer	(New Zealand) Fay Lobb (New Zealand) Barbara Simpson	
2 Nov.	Arcadia County Park Tournament; Arcadia Tennis Center; Arcadia, United States; Clay (i); Singles - Doubles	(United States) Pam Teeguarden; 6–2, 3–6, 6–2	(United States) Cindy Thomas		
2 Nov.	Osorio Cup (South America Tennis Confederation) (team event); Montevideo, Uruguay; Clay	Argentina; 5–0	Brazil	Chile; Uruguay	Colombia; Ecuador; Peru; Venezuela
8 Nov.	Dewar Cup Torquay; Palace Hotel; Torquay, Great Britain; Carpet (i); Singles - Doubles	(United States) Julie Heldman; 4–6, 8–6, 6–3	(United Kingdom) Virginia Wade	(United Kingdom) Ann Haydon Jones (United Kingdom) Joyce Williams	(Australia) Wendy Gilchrist (Australia) Helen Gourlay (United Kingdom) Corinne Molesworth (South Africa) Annette Du Plooy
8 Nov.	Campeonato Argentino; Tennis Club Argentino; Buenos Aires, Argentina; Clay; Singles - Doubles	(Argentina) Beatriz Araujo; 8–6, 6–1	(Argentina) Inés Roget		
15 Nov.	Dewar Cup Finals; Crystal Palace Sports Centre; London, Great Britain; Carpet (i); Singles - Doubles	(United Kingdom) Virginia Wade; 7–6, (6-4) 2–6, 6–2	(United States) Julie Heldman	(United Kingdom) Ann Haydon Jones (United Kingdom) Joyce Williams	(United States) Mary Ann Curtis (Australia) Helen Gourlay (United Kingdom) Corinne Molesworth (South Africa) Annette Du Plooy
16 Nov.	South American Open Championships; Buenos Aires LTC; Buenos Aires, Argentina; Clay; Singles - Doubles	(West Germany) Helga Niessen; 6–4, 6–4	(United States) Rosie Casals	(United States) Billie Jean King (France) Francoise Durr	(Argentina) Beatriz Araujo (Uruguay) Fiorella Bonicelli (Ecuador) María Guzmán (West Germany) Kora Schediwy
22 Nov.	Wills Open British Covered Court Championships; London, Great Britain; Carpet (i) - £20,000; Singles - Doubles	(United Kingdom) Ann Haydon Jones; 9–11, 6–2, 9–7	(United States) Billie Jean King	(United States) Julie Heldman (United Kingdom) Virginia Wade	(France) Francoise Durr (Australia) Wendy Gilchrist (United Kingdom) Corinne Molesworth (South Africa) Annette Du Plooy
22 Nov.	Australian Hard Court Championships; Sydney, Australia; Clay; Singles - Doubles	(Australia) Kerry Melville; 6–3, 8–10, 6–1	(Australia) Karen Krantzcke	(Sweden) Christina Sandberg (Australia) Janet Young	(Australia) Lexie Kenny Crooke (Australia) Evonne Goolagong (Australia) Jan Lehane O'Neill (United Kingdom) Winnie Shaw
22 Nov.	Southern Transvaal Championships; Ellis Park; Johannesburg, South Africa; Hard; Singles - Doubles	(South Africa) Brenda Kirk; 6–4, 6–2	(South Africa) Glenda Schaerer	(South Africa) Wendy Tomlinson (South Africa) Mynie van Zyl	
24 Nov.	Chile International Championships; Santiago, Chile; Clay; Singles - Doubles	(West Germany) Helga Niessen; 6–3, 6–0	(Spain) Carmen Ibarra	(Chile) Leyla Musalem (West Germany) Kora Schediwy	(Chile) Ana María Arias (Mexico) Carmen Fernandez (Chile) Doris Gildemeister (Ecuador) María Guzmán
30 Nov.	Stockholm Open Indoor Championships; Kungliga tennishallen Stockholm, Sweden; Hard (i); Singles - Doubles	(United States) Billie Jean King; 9–7, 6–2	(United States) Julie Heldman	(Sweden) Ingrid Bentzer (United States) Rosie Casals	(France) Francoise Durr (Switzerland) Madeleine Pegel (Sweden) Eva Lundqvist (Sweden) Margareta Strandberg
30 Nov.	Queensland Hard Court Championships; Toowoomba, Australia; Clay; Singles - Doubles	(United Kingdom) Winnie Shaw; 6–1, 6–1	(Sweden) Christina Sandberg	(Australia) Evonne Goolagong (Indonesia) Lita Liem	(United States) Pam Austin (Australia) Barbara Hawcroft (Australia) Margaret Tesch (United States) Alice Tym
30 Nov.	Japan International Championships; Den-en-chōfu, Japan; Hard; Singles - Doubles	(Japan) Kazuko Sawamatsu; 6–3, 7–5	(Japan) Kimiyo Hatanaka	(Japan) Junko Sawamatsu (Taiwan) Chung Yang	(South Korea) Haru Chang (Japan) Hideko Goto (Japan) Kazuko Kuromatsu (United States) Ceci Martinez

=== December ===
Ended	Tournament	Winner	Finalist	Semi finalist	Quarter finalist
3 Dec.	Sao Paulo International; São Paulo, Brazil; Clay; Singles - Doubles	(West Germany) Helga Niessen; 6–43, 8–6	(West Germany) Kora Schediwy	(Argentina) Ana María Arias (Brazil) Suzana Petersen	(Chile) Michelle Boulle-Rodríguez (Chile) Patricia Rivera (Brazil) L Saracchi
7 Dec.	Coupe Albert Canet; Paris, France; Wood (i); Singles - Doubles	(France) Odile de Roubin; 5–7,6–2, 6–2	(France) Janine Lieffrig	(France) Danièle Bouteleux (France) Claudine Rouire	
8 Dec.	Queensland Championships; Brisbane, Australia; Grass; Singles - Doubles	(United Kingdom) Winnie Shaw; 11–9, 6–3	(Australia) Karen Krantzcke	(Australia) Kerry Harris (Sweden) Christina Sandberg	(Australia) Evonne Goolagong (Australia) Vicki Lancaster (United States) Alice Tym (Australia) Janet Young
21 Dec.	Wellington Championships; Wellington, New Zealand; Clay; Singles - Doubles	(United States) Alice Tym; 6–2, 6–2	(New Zealand) Sue Blakely	(New Zealand) Robyn Legge (New Zealand) Christine McLauchlan	(Canada) Stephanie Bardsley (New Zealand) Ruia Morrison-Davy (New Zealand) Jill Fraser (New Zealand) Marilyn Pryde
22 Dec.	Mexican National Championships; Club Deportivo Potosino; San Luis Potosí, Mexico; Clay; Singles - Doubles	(Mexico) Elena Subirats; 3–6, 6–3, 6–3	(Mexico) Lulu Gongora	(Mexico) Alina Balbiers (Mexico) Patricia Montano	
27 Dec. (Note: Two editions of Border State Championships were held this season, the first beginning in December 1968 and ending in January 1969, the second ending in December 1969.)	Border Championships; East London, South Africa; Hard; Singles - Doubles	(United States) Peaches Bartkowicz; 6–1, 6–4	(United Kingdom) Ann Haydon Jones	(Australia) Helen Gourlay (Rhodesia) Pat Walkden	(United States) Denise Carter (South Africa) Brenda Kirk (United States) Kristy Pigeon (United States) Valerie Ziegenfuss
28 Dec.	Coupe Michel Bivort; Paris, France; Carpet (i); Singles - Doubles	(United Kingdom) Lindsey Beaven; 5–7,6–2, 6–2	(United Kingdom) Veronica Burton	(Netherlands) Nora Blom (France) Anne-Marie Cassaigne	(France) Marie-Christine Brochard (United Kingdom) E Cramer (France) Sophie Prouvost (France) Patricia Rime

== World rankings ==
These are the Top 10 World Rankings for 1969 by tennis journalists, magazines and authors. WTA Rankings did not begin until 1974/75.

Lance Tingay	Bud Collins	Rino Tommasi	Frank Rostron. (Daily Express)
1. Margaret Court; 2. Ann Haydon Jones; 3. Billie Jean King; 4. Nancy Richey; 5. Julie Heldman; 6. Rosie Casals; 7. Kerry Melville; 8. Peaches Bartkowicz; 9. Virginia Wade; 10. Lesley Turner Bowrey	1. Margaret Court; 2. Ann Haydon Jones; 3. Billie Jean King; 4. Nancy Richey; 5. Julie Heldman; 6. Rosie Casals; 7. Kerry Melville; 8. Mary Ann Curtis; 9. Virginia Wade; 10. Lesley Turner Bowrey	1. Margaret Court; 2. Ann Haydon Jones; 3. Billie Jean King; 4. Nancy Richey; 5. Julie Heldman; 6. Rosie Casals; 7. Kerry Melville; 8. Virginia Wade; 9. Judy Tegart; 10. Peaches Bartkowicz	1. Margaret Court; 2. Ann Haydon Jones; 3. Billie Jean King; 4. Julie Heldman; 5. Nancy Richey; 6. = Kerry Melville = Rosie Casals; 8. Peaches Bartkowicz; 9. = Lesley Turner Bowrey = Virginia Wade

== Tournament winners (singles) ==
This is a list of winners by the total number of singles titles won for 1969:

- (Australia) Margaret Court – Australian Open, Berkeley, Bournemouth, Bristol, Caracas, Charlotte, Chestnut Hill, French Open, Frinton-On-Sea, Haverford, Houston, Hurlingham, Locust Valley, Melbourne, Newport, Perth, San Juan, Sydney, US Open (19)
- (United States) Billie Jean King – Binghamton, Dublin, Durban, Johannesburg, Los Angeles, Los Angeles II, Midland, Oakland, Portland, St Louis, Stockholm (11)
- (West Germany) Helga Niessen Masthoff – Bielefeld, Buenos Aires, Düsseldorf, Leverkusen, Nuremberg, Poertschach, Santiago, São Paulo, Stuttgart, Stuttgart II, Travemunde (11)
- (United Kingdom) Ann Haydon Jones – Aix-En-Provence, Auckland, Brussels, London, Monte Carlo, Nagoya, Osaka, Wembley, Wimbledon (9)
- (United States) Peaches Bartkowicz – Bastad, East London II, Monte Carlo, Nice, Reggio Emilia, Richmond, Sopot, Stuttgart, Warsaw (9)
- (United States) Alice Tym – Casablanca, Chicago, Jaipur, Madras, Natanya, New Delhi, Tel Aviv, Visakhapatnam. Wellington (9)
- (United States) Julie Heldman – Barranquilla, Curaçao, La Costa, Moscow, Pompano Beach, Rome, Tel Aviv, Torquay (8)
- (United Kingdom) Virginia Wade – Cape Town, Hoylake, London, Paris, Perth, Port Talbot, Stalybridge (7)
- (Australia) Kerry Melville – Barcelona, Guildford, Hilversum, Hobart, Rockdale, Rome, St. Petersburg (7)
- (Rhodesia) Patricia Walkden – Bloemfontein, Brumana, East London, Istanbul, Tehran (5)
- (United States) Mary Ann Curtis – Agawam, Brookville, Manchester, Surbiton, Winchester (5)
- (United States) Stephanie DeFina – Fort Lauderdale, Miami, Orlando, West Palm Beach (4)
- (Australia) Karen Krantzcke – Adelaide, Brisbane, Launceston, Strathfield (4)
- (Czechoslovakia) Marie Neumannová – Klamovka, Palermo, Prague, Reggio Calabria (4)
- (United States) Betty Ann Grubb – Ojai, Overland Park, Tulsa, Wimbledon II, (4)
- (Australia) Evonne Goolagong – Cowra, Grafton, Manuka, Sydney (4)
- (Sweden) Christina Sandberg – Cologne, Helsinki, Stockholm, Viareggio (4)
- (United Kingdom) Sally Holdsworth – Beersheba, Haifa, Natanya, Thessaloniki (4)
- (United States) Nancy Richey – Atlanta, Las Vegas, Phoenix (3)
- (Australia) Lesley Turner Bowrey – Cincinnati, Kansas City, Kingston (3)
- (Soviet Union) Olga Morozova – Moscow, Moscow II, Moscow III (3)
- (Japan) Kazuko Sawamatsu – Den-en-Chofu, Senigallia, Tokyo (3)
- (Belgium) Ingrid Loeys – Beaulieu-sur-Mer, Brussels, Lyon (3)
- (Brazil) Suzana Petersen – Brooklands, Cardiff, Lisbon (3)
- (United States) Emilie Burrer – Mobile, Northfield, Tucson (3)
- (Spain) Ana María Estalella – Palma, Madrid, San Sebastian (3)
- (Romania) Judith Dibar – Amritsar, New Delhi, (2)
- (Australia) Judy Tegart – Hamburg, Kitzbuhel (2)
- (Austria) Trude Schonberger – Salzburg, Zell am See (2)
- (United Kingdom) Winnie Shaw – Brisbane, Toowoomba (2)
- (Czechoslovakia) Olga Lendlova – Champéry, Geneva (2)
- (United Kingdom) Joan Wilshere – Santander, Vigo (2)
- (United States) Linda Tuero – Chattanooga, Rochester (2)
- (United Kingdom) Corinne Molesworth – Barnes, Chingford (2)
- (United States) Marjorie Gengler – Mamaroneck, Port Washington (2)
- (United Kingdom) Nell Truman – Alexandria, Cheltenham (2)
- (United States) Eliza Pande – Sacramento, San Francisco II (2)
- (Ecuador) María Guzmán – Quito, Rome (2)
- (United Kingdom) Susan Tutt – Birmingham, Havant (2)
- (France) Gail Chanfreau – Indianapolis, Manly (2)
- (United States) Mary Struthers – La Jolla, Seattle (2)
- (United Kingdom) Shirley Brasher – Cranleigh, Southport (2)
- (United States) Chris Evert – Delray Beach (1)
- (Australia) Lesley Hunt – Montana (1)
- (Netherlands) Betty Stöve – Paris (1)
- (South Africa) Esmé Emmanuel – Fresno (1)
- (Netherlands) Marijke Schaar – Cannes (1)
- (Italy) Lea Pericoli – Cairo (1)
- (Mexico) Elena Subirats – San Luis Potosí (1)
- (Switzerland) Anne-Marie Studer – Lugano (1)
- (Argentina) Beatriz Araujo – Buenos Aires (1)
- (United States) Rosie Casals – Baltimore (1)
- (Denmark) Mari Ann Bloch Jorgensen – Copenhagen (1)
- (United States) Barbara Downs – Diablo Valley (1)
- (France) Francoise Durr – Gstaad (1)
- (United States) Patti Hogan – South Orange (1)
- (United Kingdom) Christine Truman Janes – Nottingham (1)
- (New Zealand) Beverly Vercoe – Auckland (1)
- (Japan) Kimiyo Hatanaka – Forest Hill (1)
- (United States) Stephanie Grant – West Hollywood (1)
- (Australia) Val Bermingham – South Yarra (1)
- (New Zealand) Sue Blackwood – Hamilton (NZ) (1)
- (United States) Louise Gonnerman – New Haven (1)
- (Australia) Lynne Nette – Melbourne (1)
- (Israel) Paulina Peisachov – Nicosia (1)
- (Canada) Vivienne Strong – Toronto (1)
- (United States) Tina Lyman – Mountain View (1)
- (Australia) Wendy Gilchrist – Newcastle (1)
- (Poland) Barbara Kral – Lodz (1)
- (United Kingdom) Janice MacFarlane – Edgbaston (1)
- (Uruguay) Fiorella Bonicelli – La Coruña (1)
- (Chile) Ana María Arias – Le Touquet (1)
- (Italy) Maria Nasuelli – Catania (1)
- (United States) Valerie Ziegenfuss – Mexico City (1)
- (United Kingdom) Joyce Williams – Hampstead (1)
- (Argentina) Anna-Maria Cavadini – Madrid (1)
- (United States) Marcie Louie – San Francisco (1)
- (France) Gail Chanfreau – Naples (1)
- (United Kingdom) Janice Townsend – Droitwich (1)
- (Czechoslovakia) Alena Palmeova – Ostrava (1)
- (United States) Janet Newberry – Los Angeles (1)
- (United Kingdom) Robin Lloyd – St Anne's on Sea (1)
- (West Germany) Heide Orth – Bremen (1)
- (United States) Bonnie Logan – St Louis (1)
- (Canada) Louise Brown – Toronto II (1)
- (United Kingdom) Lesley Charles – Malvern (1)
- (United States) Denise Carter – Beckenham (1)
- (Netherlands) Ada Bakker – Siófok (1)
- (United States) Chris Beck – Wilmington (1)
- (South Africa) Anita van Deventer – Felixstowe (1)
- (United States) Nadine Netter – Mamaroneck II (1)
- (United States) Connie Capozzi – Birmingham (US) (1)
- (United Kingdom) Elizabeth Graham – Durham (1)
- (United Kingdom) Marjorie Love – Edinburgh (1)
- (Italy) Maria Teresa Riedl – Verona (1)
- (United States) Carole Graebner– Anaheim (1)

== Season statistics ==
=== Singles ===
- Total Tournaments (291)
- Most Titles: (Australia) Margaret Court (19)
- Most Finals: (Australia) Margaret Court (20)
- Most Matches Played: (Australia) Margaret Court (109)
- Most Matches Won: (Australia) Margaret Court (103)
- Match Winning %: (Australia) Margaret Court (94.5%)
- Most Tournaments Played: (Australia) Karen Krantzcke (33)
- Most Head 2 Heads Meets: (United States) Billie Jean King vs. (United Kingdom) Ann Haydon Jones & (United Kingdom) Virginia Wade vs. (United States) Julie Heldman (10)

== Selected sources ==
- Barrett, John, ed. (1970). BP year book of World Tennis 1970 (Results for 1969). London: Clipper Press. ISBN 0851080049. OCLC 502255545. OL 21635829M.
- Newspapers.com by Ancestry. Historical Newspaper Archive 1700s to 2000s Lindon, Utah, United States. via the Wikipedia Library.
- Robertson, Max (1974). The Encyclopedia of Tennis. London: George Allen & Unwin Ltd. ISBN 0047960426.
