= Jade Schiffman =

American ophthalmologist and tennis player

- Full name: Jade Stacy Schiffman
- Country (sports): United States
- Plays: Left-handed

Singles

Grand Slam singles results
- US Open: 2R (1968)

Jade Stacy Schiffman is an American ophthalmologist and former professional tennis player.

Schiffman, a left-handed player from New York, featured on tour in the 1960s and 1970s. She made the main draw of the 1968 US Open as a last-minute alternate and won through to the second round, beating Carole Herrick.

While competing on the professional circuit, Schiffman was also studying for a medical degree at Upstate Medical University in Syracuse. She is now working as an ophthalmologist in Houston.
