= Sabadell International =

Defunct tennis tournament
- Tour: ILTF World Circuit (1970–1972) women ILTF Independent Circuit (1970–1972) men
- Founded: 1969; 57 years ago
- Abolished: 1971; 55 years ago
- Location: Sabadell, Spain
- Venue: Club Tennis Sabadell
- Surface: Clay / outdoor

The Sabadell International or Torneo Internacional Sabadell was a men's and women's clay court tennis tournament was established in 1969. The tournament ran until 1971 when it was discontinued.

== History ==
The Sabadell International was the name given to the International Championships of Barcelona when they were relocated from Barcelona to Sabadell, Catalonia for three editions only. The tournament was played at Club Tennis Sabadell (founded 1928), in Sabadell, Spain until 1971 when the women's event was branded as the Torneo Calidad Sabadell for that year. The tournament was discontinued when the Barcelona International Championships resumed at its original venue in 1973.

== Finals ==
=== Men's singles ===
(incomplete roll)

Year	Winners	Runners-up	Score
Torneo Internacional Sabadell
1969	(Australia) John Gardner	(Australia) John Bartlett	2-6 7-5 6-3 6–2.
1970	(Colombia) William Álvarez	(Australia) Barry Phillips-Moore	9-7 6–2.
1971	(Australia) Geoff Masters	(Colombia) William Álvarez	6-4 0-6 8-6 6–3.

=== Women's singles ===
(incomplete roll)

Year	Winners	Runners-up	Score
Torneo Internacional Sabadell
1969	(Argentina) Ana Maria Cavadini	(Israel) Raquel Giscafré	6-3 retired
1970	(West Germany) Brigitte Schoene	(Spain) Eliane de Niort	6–2, 6–1
Torneo Calidad Sabadell
1971	(Chile) Leyla Musalem	(West Germany) Brigitte Schoene	6–4, 6–2
