= Romanian Championship =

Romanian Championships or Romanian Championship may refer to:

- Liga I (football)
- Romanian Chess Championship
- Romanian Figure Skating Championships
- Romanian Gymnastics National Championships
- Romanian Rally Championship
- National American Football Championship of Romania
- SuperLiga (rugby)
