= ATP Palma International =

Defunct tennis tournament
- Event name: Trofeo Alomar
- Sponsor: Alomar SAL
- Founded: 1968
- Abolished: 1976
- Location: Mallorca; Palma; Spain
- Venue: Mallorca Tennis Club
- Surface: Clay

The ATP Palma International was a men's ILTF affiliated clay court tennis tournament founded in 1968 as a combined event called the Mallorca International. Also known as the Palma de Mallorca International, the men's competition was also jointly known as the Trofeo Alomar (its sponsored name). The tournament was played at the Mallorca Tennis Club (founded in 1964), Palma de Mallorca, Spain until 1976.

== Finals ==
=== Men's singles ===
(incomplete roll) included:

Year	Winners	Runners-up	Score
1968	(France) François Jauffret	(Colombia) Jairo Velasco Sr.	1–6, 6–4, 6–2 7–5
1969	(Spain) Juan Gisbert Sr.	(West Germany) Harald Elschenbroich	3–6, 7–9, 6–3, 8–6, 6–2
1975	(Brazil) José Edison Mandarino	(Spain) José Moreno	6–4, 6–4, 1–6, 6–2
1976	(United Kingdom) Buster Mottram	(Japan) Jun Kuki	7–5, 6–3, 6–3

=== Women's singles ===
Year	Winners	Runners-up	Score
1968	(United Kingdom) Frances MacLennan	(Spain) Ana María Estalella	6–2, 6–2
1969	(Spain) Ana María Estalella	(Belgium) Ingrid Loeys	6–3, 6–3
