= Southern Transvaal Championships =

Defunct tennis tournament
- Tour: ILTF Circuit
- Founded: 1891; 134 years ago
- Abolished: 1977; 48 years ago
- Location: Johannesburg, Transvaal, South Africa
- Venue: Wanderers Lawn Tennis Club/Ellis Park Lawn Tennis Club
- Surface: Grass/Hard

The Southern Transvaal Championships was a men's and women's international tennis tournament founded as the Transvaal Championships 1891 and was originally played on outdoor grass courts at the Wanderers Lawn Tennis Club, then switched to hard courts later. It was first staged at the Wanderers Lawn Tennis Club, Cape Town, Western Cape Province, South Africa. The championships were held until 1977.

== History ==
The Transvaal Championships were established in 1891, and was organised by the Transvaal Lawn Tennis Association (later called the Southern Transvaal Lawn Tennis Association). In 1913 the championships were one time only in Pretoria. In 1919 the Transvaal Championships name changed into Southern Transvaal Championships. In 1920 the event was moved to Ellis Park Lawn Tennis Club. The Southern Transvaal Championships were held until 1977.

== Venues ==
The championships were originally staged at the Wanderers Lawn Tennis Club,Johannesburg, Transvaal, South Africa. In 1920 the tournament was moved to the Ellis Park Lawn Tennis Club which was part of Ellis Park Sports Complex, that club in the 1970s consisted of 22 tennis courts and a center court holding between 6000 and 7000 spectators.
