= Cranleigh Open =

Defunct tennis tournament
- Tour: ILTF Circuit (1913-1968)
- Founded: 1923; 102 years ago
- Abolished: 1981; 44 years ago
- Location: Cranleigh, Surrey, England
- Venue: Cranleigh Tennis Club
- Surface: Grass

The Cranleigh Open was a combined men's and women's grass court tennis tournament founded in 1923. It was played in Cranleigh, Surrey, England through till 1981 when it was discontinued.

== History ==
Cranleigh Tennis Club was founded in 1923, and was formally incorporated in 1929. In 1923 the club inaugurated an open lawn tennis tournament played in Cranleigh, Surrey, England. The tournament was continuously played annually with the exception of World War II when it was not staged from 1940 to 1945. After the second world war the tournament resumed through till 1981 when it was abolished.
