= La Jolla Tennis Championships =

Tournament information
- Tour: ILTF World Circuit (1924-1976)
- Founded: 1917; 108 years ago
- Editions: 109
- Location: La Jolla, California, United States
- Venue: La Jolla Tennis Club
- Surface: Hard

The La Jolla Tennis Championships is a USTA-affiliatedhard court tennis competition that includes several subsidiary tournaments, the most notable being the open La Jolla Summer Tournament. It was founded in 1917 as the La Jolla Championships by Archibald Talboy. It was first held at the La Jolla Recreational Center, where Talboy served as the director. Since 1923, the event has been held at La Jolla Tennis Club, a public tennis facility in La Jolla, California, where it continues to take place today. The annual open championships, also known as the summer tournament, were part of the main ILTF World Circuit from 1924 to 1976. The competition today comes under the administration of the USTA Southern California section.

== See also ==
- La Jolla Beach Invitational
