= Anaheim Open =

Defunct tennis tournament
- Tour: ILTF World Circuit (1969) men (1969–70) womenILTF Independent Circuit (1970) men
- Founded: 1968; 57 years ago
- Abolished: 1970; 55 years ago
- Location: Anaheim, California, United States
- Venue: Pearson Park Tennis Courts
- Surface: Hard / outdoor

The Anaheim Open was a men's and women's hard court tennis tournament was established in 1968 as the Anaheim Invitational Tennis Tournament. The tournament was played at Pearson Park Tennis Courts, Pearson Park, Anaheim, California, United States until 1970 when it was discontinued.

== History ==
The tournament was first established in April 1968 as the Anaheim Invitational Tennis Tournament. In 1969 with the advent of Open era the tournaments name was rebranded as the Anaheim Open. The tournament was co-sponsored by the Anaheim Tennis Club and the Anaheim Parks & Recreation Department, with the event staged at the Pearson Park Tennis Courts, Pearson Park, Anaheim, California until 1970 when it was discontinued.

== Finals ==
=== Men's singles ===
(incomplete roll)

Year	Winners	Runners-up	Score
1968	(United States) Earl O’Neill	(United States) Jerry Van Linge	6–3, 6–1.
1969	(Pakistan) Haroon Rahim	(United States) Ed Grubb	7–5, 6–3.
1970	(United States) Tom Karp	(United States) Gregory Jablonski	11–9, 6–3.

=== Women's singles ===
(incomplete roll)

Year	Winners	Runners-up	Score
1968	(United States) Norma Kellenberg	(United States) Mary Radabaugh	6–1, 9–11, 6–4
1969	(United States) Carole Graebner	(United States) Pam Teeguarden	8–6, 6–4
1970	(United States) Kristien Kemmer	(United States) Laurie Tenney	6–2, 6–0
