= Bielefeld Challenger =

Defunct tennis tournament
- Tour: ILTF World Circuit
- Founded: 1907; 119 years ago
- Abolished: 2004; 22 years ago
- Location: Bielefeld, North Rhine-Westphalia, Germany
- Venue: Bielefeld Tennis Tournament Club (1907-1981); Bielefeld Tennis Club Games and Sports (1984-2004)
- Surface: Clay / outdoor

The Bielefeld Challenger or ATP Challenger Bielefeld was a men's clay court tennis tournament founded in 1907 as combined event called the Bielefeld Tennis Tournament.

In 1949 the tournament was branded as the Bielefeld International until 1981. The tournament was first played at the Bielefeld Tennis Tournament Club (BTTC), then later at the Bielefeld Tennis Club Games and Sports, Bielefeld, Germany until 2004.

== History ==
In 1905 the Bielefeld Tennis Tournament Club BTTC) was founded in 1905. In 1907 it established the Bielefeld Tennis Tournament that ran annually until just before World War II. In 1949 following the second world war the event was rebranded as the Bielefeld International Tennis Tournament, that ran annually as part of the ILTF World Circuit until 1970 when it was downgraded from the main worldwide tour.

In 1973 the tournament was revived at a new venue the Bielefeld Tennis Club Games and Sports (Tennisclub Spiel und Sport Bielefeld) founded in 1909, and was part of the ILTF Independent Circuit until 1975. In 1976 the tournament became part of the German National Grand Prix Series (Deutsche Grand-Prix-Serie) until 1981 when it was discontinued again. In 1984 the event was revived as an ATP Challenger tournament played at the same venue, however this was not a permanent fixture in the tennis calendar as the tournament was held only for three more editions in 1991, 1998 and 2004 when it was abolished. As of 2024 an international tournament is currently being held back at the original venue called the International Westphalian Senior Tennis Championships.
