= Polish Indoor Tennis Championships =

Tournament information
- Tour: PTA Circuit
- Founded: 1950
- Location: Pszczyna; Poland
- Venue: Silesian Tennis Center
- Category: National Championship
- Surface: Hard (i)

Current champions (15-21 February 2026)
- Men's singles: (Poland) Jasza Szajrych
- Women's singles: (Poland) Inka Wawrzkiewicz

The Polish Indoor Tennis Championships is a Polish Tennis Association combined tennis tournament founded in 1950 as the Polish Winter Championships.

== History ==
On January 14, 1947, the board of the Gliwice club applied to the Polish Tennis Association for permission to hold the 1st Polish Indoor Championships. However, the tournament was not approved that year due to a lack of adequate facilities and spectators in the hall.

On 11 December 1949, the General Assembly of PTA Delegates once again passed a resolution to organize the Polish Indoor Tennis Championships in 1950. However, just before the event, scheduled for March, the PTA board withdrew its consent, the event unofficial event still went ahead.

The event had been known by various names: the Polish Indoor Tennis Tournament, the Polish Winter Tournament... The Polish Indoor Championships" first appears in the PTA calendar in the 1958 season.

The first winners of the inaugural 1950 tournament held in Gliwice was won by Alfred Buchalik who defeated Tadeusz Kołcz, Włodzimierz Wojciechowski and Tadeusz Piotrrowski in the mens round robin event.

In 1953 the first womens singles event is staged won by Jadwiga Jędrzejowska who beat Maria Rudowska in the final.

Once a regular event on ILTF World Open Circuit the tournament is still being held today.
