= Howard Hughes Open Tennis Championships =

Defunct tennis tournament
- Tour: WCT Circuit
- Founded: 1969
- Abolished: 1970
- Editions: 2
- Location: Las Vegas, Nevada; United States
- Venue: The Frontier Hotel and Casino Tennis Courts
- Surface: Hard / outdoor
- Draw: 32 S (men)
- Prize money: $50,000

The Howard Hughes Open Tennis Championships or Howard Hughes Open was a WCT-affiliated hard court tennis tournament founded in 1969. The tournament was played at the The Frontier Hotel and Casino tennis courts, Las Vegas, Nevada, United States. Also known as the Howard Hughes Invitational the event was part of the WCT Circuit until 1970.

== History ==
In December 1967 the US billionaire business man Howard Hughes bought the Frontier Hotel and Casino, for $23 million, and set about renovate it. In 1969 the Howard Hughes Open Championships was established combined mens and womens tournament that was played on outdoor hard courts at the Frontier Hotel, Las Vegas, Nevada, United States, that event ran for two editions only until 1970.

In 1971 a new successor women's only Caesars Palace World Pro Championships tournament was established that ran for one edition only.

In 1972 a new men's successor event to the Howard Hughes Invitational called the Alan King Tennis Classic began. That event ran annually until 1985, and both of these events were played at the Caesars Palace Hotel.

== Past finals ==
=== Men's singles ===
Year	Winners	Runners-up	Score
1969	(United States) Pancho Gonzales	(United States) Arthur Ashe	6–0, 6–2, 6–4
1970	(United States) Pancho Gonzales (2)	(Australia) Rod Laver	6–1, 7–5, 5–7, 6–3

=== Women's singles ===
Year	Winners	Runners-up	Score
1969	(United States) Nancy Richey	(United States) Billie Jean King	2–6, 6–4, 6–1
