= Lee-on-Solent Open =

Defunct tennis tournament
- Event name: Lee-on-Solent Open (1921-70); Mercedes Benz Lee-on-Solent Open (1971-1973); Lee-on-Solent Open (1974–82); ATP Challenger Lee-on-Solent (1982–84, 98, 2000) (men); ITF Lee-on-Solent Tournament (1982–97) (women)
- Tour: ILTF World Circuit; ILTF Independent Circuit; ATP Challenger Tour
- Founded: 1921; 104 years ago
- Abolished: 1997; 28 years ago
- Location: Lee-on-Solent, Hampshire, England
- Venue: Lee-on-Solent Lawn Tennis and Squash Club
- Surface: Clay (1921-84); Hard (1997-2000)

The Lee-on-Solent Open was a clay court then later hard court tennis event founded in 1921. It was held at the Lee-on-Solent Lawn Tennis and Squash Club (f.1911), Lee-on-Solent, Hampshire, England through until 2000 when it was abolished.

== History ==
The Lee-on-Solent Open tournament was first inaugurated in 1921 and was played continually through to 1938. In 1939 the tournament was cancelled. Following World War II the tournament resumed in 1946. In 1971 the tournament secured sponsorship from the German car maker Mercedes-Benz and for the next three years was known as the Mercedes Benz Lee-on-Solent Open until 1974.

In 1982 the tournament ceased to be part of the senior worldwide tour, and both the men's and women's events were downgraded. The men's event became part of ATP Challenger Tour known as the Lee-On-Solent Challenger (1982–1984, 1998, 2000). The women's tournament became part of the ITF Circuit known as the ITF Lee-On-Solent Tournament (1982–1997).

From 1921 through until 1984 the surface was always clay courts. From 1997 until 2000 it switched to hard courts.

== Event names ==
- Lee-on-Solent Open (1921–70)
- Mercedes Benz Lee-on-Solent Open (1971–1973)
- Lee-on-Solent Open (1974–81)
- ATP Lee-on-Solent Challenger (1982–1984, 1998, 2000) (men)
- ITF Lee-on-Solent Tournament (1982–1997) (women)
