= Long Island Clay Court Championships =

Defunct tennis tournament
- Founded: 1930; 95 years ago
- Abolished: 1983; 42 years ago
- Location: Brooklyn; Hackensack; Port Washington
- Venue: Various
- Surface: Clay

The Long Island Clay Court Championships was a men's and women's clay court tennis tournament founded in 1930 in Brooklyn, United States. The tournament was staged until 1983 when it was discontinued.

== History ==
The tournament was established in 1930 and was played intermittently until 1983. The event on some occasions was held in conjunction with both the Eastern Clay Court Championships and the New York State Clay Court Championships. The grass court version of this event was called the Long Island Championships.
