= Oakland Pro Championships =

Defunct tennis tournament
- Tour: NTL Pro Tour
- Founded: 1968; 57 years ago
- Abolished: 1969; 56 years ago
- Location: Hayward; Oakland
- Venue: Chabot College Tennis Centre; Oakland Arena
- Surface: Carpet / indoor

The Oakland Pro Championships was a men's and women's professional tennis tournament first held in 1968. Also known as the NTL Oakland Pro Championships it was first played on indoor carpet courts at the Oakland Arena, Oakland, United States. The event ran for two editions until 1969.

== History ==
The Oakland Pro Championships was a men's and women's indoor carpet court professional tennis tournament founded in 1968. It was played at the Oakland Arena, Oakland, United States. In 1968 the event became part of the National Tennis League and for that tour was branded as the NTL Oakland Pro Championships. In 1969 the event was rebranded as the Oakland Invitational Pro Championships. During this final edition the men's singles final was held at the Oakland Arena, whilst the women's singles final was held at the Chabot College Tennis Centre, Hayward, California.

== Finals ==
=== Men's singles ===
Year	Champions	Runners-up	Score
1968	(Australia) Fred Stolle	(United States) Pancho Gonzales	7–6, 6–3.
1969	(Australia) Tony Roche	(Australia) Rod Laver	4–6, 6–4, 11–9.

=== Women's singles ===
Year	Champions	Runners-up	Score
1969	(United States) Billie Jean King	(United Kingdom) Ann Haydon Jones	6–2, 6–2

=== Mixed doubles ===
Year	Champions	Runners-up	Score
1969	(United States) Marty Riessen (United States) Billie Jean King	(Australia) Fred Stolle (United States) Rosie Casals	6–4

== Event names ==
- NTL Oakland Pro Championships (1968)
- Oakland Invitational Pro Championships (1969)
