= Iranian International Championships =

Defunct tennis tournament
- Tour: ILTF Circuit
- Founded: 1966; 60 years ago
- Abolished: 1970; 56 years ago
- Location: Tehran, Iran
- Venue: Opt Esteghlal Tennis Club
- Surface: Clay / outdoor

The Iranian International Championships also known as the Iran International was a men's clay court tennis tournament founded in 1966. It was first held in Opt Esteghlal Tennis Club, Tehran, Iran. The tournament ran until 1970 then was discontinued.

== History ==
In 1937 the Iranian Tennis Federation was founded. In 1948 Iran was admitted as a full member of the International Lawn Tennis Federation. In 1966 the first leading open international tournament was established the Iranian International Championships. The championships were usually held in September until 1970.

== Past finals ==
=== Men's singles ===
Year	Champion	Runner-up	Score
1966	(South Africa) Bob Hewitt	(United Kingdom) Roger Taylor	4-6, 6-3, 6-3
1967	?	?	
1968	?	?	
1969	(South Africa) Bob Hewitt	(West Germany) Wilhelm Bungert	6-2, 6-0, 6-0
1970	(France) François Jauffret	(Socialist Federal Republic of Yugoslavia) Nikola Špear	6-4, 6-4, 6-2

== See also ==
- Category:National and multi-national tennis tournaments
