= Border Championships =

Defunct tennis tournament
- Tour: ILTF Circuit
- Founded: 1902; 124 years ago
- Abolished: 1981; 45 years ago
- Location: East London, Eastern Cape Province, South Africa
- Venue: Selborne Park Tennis Club
- Surface: Clay/Hard

The Border Championships was a men's and women's international tennis tournament established in 1902 as the Border State Championships and was played on outdoor clay then hard courts at the Selborne Park Tennis Club, East London, Eastern Cape Province, South Africa until 1981.

== History ==
The Border Championships were established in 1902 and was organised by the Border Tennis Union. The championships were part of the Sugar Circuit (f. 1962) of tennis tournaments from the 1960s to 1980s. In 1980 the tournament was ended due to the withdraw of sponsorship by South African Sugar Association.

== Venues ==
The championships were staged at the Selborne Park Tennis Club East London, Eastern Cape Province, South Africa.
