= Redcliffe Championships =

Defunct tennis tournament
- Tour: ILTF World Circuit (1955–83)
- Founded: 1953; 73 years ago
- Abolished: 1983; 43 years ago
- Location: Redcliffe, Queensland, Australia
- Venue: Redcliffe Tennis Club
- Surface: Hard (1955-59, 63-66); Grass court (1957-58); Clay (1954, 1960-62, 67-?)

The Redcliffe Championships was a men's and women's open tennis tournament founded in 1953, and held at Redcliffe, Queensland, Australia. It was first organised by the Peninsula Tennis Association and originally played on clay courts, then switching later grass courts, then hard courts. It was staged as part of ILTF Australasia Circuit a sub circuit of the ILTF World Circuit until 1983 when it was discontinued.

== History ==
The tournament was founded in 1953 and held in Redcliffe, Queensland, Australia. The event was first organised by the Peninsula Tennis Association. The first men's singles champion was Jack Arkinstall who defeated Roy Emerson in straight sets, and the winner of the women's first championship was Daphne Seeney who also defeated in straight sets. It was staged as part of ILTF Australasia Circuit a sub circuit of the ILTF World Circuit until 1983 when it was discontinued. The tournament has survived in one form or another into the twenty first century where it is known as the Redcliffe Open a Tennis Queensland event.

== Finals ==
=== Men's singles ===
(incomplete roll)

Year	Champions	Runners-up	Score
1953	(Australia) Jack Arkinstall	(Australia) Roy Emerson	2–0 sets.
1954	(Australia) Mal Anderson	(Australia) Ian Ayre	8–6, 3–6, 6–4.
1955	(Australia) Richie Brant	(Australia) Lee J. Thomsen	3–6, 6–2, 6–3.
1956	(Australia) Les Flanders	(Australia) Col Ogden	5–7, 6–2, 6–2.
1957	(Australia) Rod Laver	(Australia) Barry Green	6–1, 6–4.
1958	(Australia) Rod Laver (2)	(Australia) G. Gaydon	4–6, 6–4, 6–3.
1959	(Australia) Neil Gibson	(Australia) Frank Gorman	7–5, 6–3.
1960	(Australia) Neil Gibson (2)	(Australia) Ken Fletcher	6–3, 6–1.
1963	(Australia) Ken Fletcher	(Australia) Neville Hay	6–3, 6–4.
1965	(Australia) Neil Gibson (3)	(Australia) Maurice Guse	6–4, 10–8.
1966	(Australia) Maurice Guse	(Australia) Neil Gibson	6–2, 6–2.
1968	(Australia) Merv Guse	(Australia) Neil Gibson	6–2, 6–2.
↓ Open era ↓
1969	(Australia) Merv Guse (2)	(Australia) Ross Case	4–6, 6–2, 8–6.
1970	(Australia) Ross Case	(Australia) Alvin Gardiner	6–2, 6–3.
1975	(Australia) Gary Olsson	(Australia) Rod Frawley	6–1, 7–6.
1977	(Australia) Noel Jensen	(Australia) Wayne Hampson	6–0, 6–0.
1979	(Australia) B. Walker	(Australia) Peter Mallett	7–5, 6–2.
1980	(Australia) Greg Braun	(Australia) Richard Eden	6–3, 7–5.
1981	(Australia) Max Bates	(Australia) Jeff Twist	7–5, 6–4.
1982	(Australia) Brett Greenwood	(Australia) John Frawley	w.o.
1983	(Australia) K. Williamson	(Australia) Paul Daly	6–7, 7–5, 6–1.

=== Women's singles ===
(incomplete roll)

Year	Champions	Runners-up	Score
1953	(Australia) Daphne Seeney	(Australia) Fay Muller	2–0 sets
1954	(Australia) Fay Muller	(Australia) Daphne Seeney	6–2, 2–6, 6–2
1957	(Australia) Dorothy Linde	(Australia) Z. Robinson	6–2, 3–6, 6–0
1958	(Australia) Fay Muller (2)	(Australia) Dorothy Linde	6–0, 6–4
1959	(Australia) Shirley Lee	(Australia) Dot Duff	7–5, 6–0
1969	(Australia) Marilyn Tesch	(Australia) Lexie Kenny	2–6, 6–4, 6–3
↓ Open era ↓
1970	(Australia) Janet Fallis	(Australia) Robyn Knobel	4–6, 6–0, 6–2
