= World Pro Tennis Japan Series =

Defunct tennis tournament
- Tour: ILTF & WCT & NTL Special Series
- Founded: 1969
- Abolished: 1969
- Editions: 1
- Location: Tokyo (men's final); Nagoya (round robin); Osaka (round robin); Japan
- Venue: Tokyo Metropolitan Gymnasium; Osaka Prefectural Gymnasium; Nagoya Aichi Prefectural Gymnasium
- Surface: Carpet / indoor
- Prize money: $27 777 (men) $16,000 women)

The World Pro Tennis Japan Series was an early open era special tennis tour held from 3 to 10 May 1969 in Japan. Jointly-promoted by local Japanese organizers, the ILTF, World Championship Tennis (WCT) and the National Tennis League (NTL), this eight-day multi-city series staged in Nagoya, Osaka and Tokyo operated as a high-profile international promotional tour. Also known as the Japan Pro Series or Japan Professional Series The series featured contract professionals from rival tennis organizations alongside independent "registered professionals," playing in a round robin format with play off finals.

== History ==
Following the arrival of open tennis, international promoters sought to capitalize on the growing Japanese market by organizing a traveling pro circuit in the spring of 1969. The series featured a total prize purse of $27,777, and moved through three major metropolitan cities, featuring both men's and women's draws.

The Japan Pro Series tour operated on a multi-city promotional layout where the men's and women's events concluded independently. The women's portion of the tour was split into separate regional events including the Japan Pro Series Osaka, and the Japan Pro Series Nagoya with $8000 prize money each Great Britain's Ann Jones won both of those events.

The men's series also played in Nagoya and Osaka concluded in Tokyo for its final stages. The Dutch independent pro star Tom Okker secured the overall series defeating the NTL's Australian pro Roy Emerson in a best of three set final.

This series was the successor event to the earlier, pre-Open Era Japanese Pro Championships that were normally played in November.

== Men's series finals ==
=== First & Second place ===
Year	Location	Champions	Runners-up	Score
1969	Tokyo	(Netherlands) Tom Okker	(Australia) Roy Emerson	6–3, 6–5

=== Third & Fourth place ===
Year	Location	Champions	Runners-up	Score
1969	Osaka	(Australia) Rod Laver	(United States) Butch Buchholz	3–0 (sets)

== Women's series finals ==
=== Japan Pro Series Nagoya ===
Year	Location	Champions	Runners-up	Score
1969	Nagoya	(United Kingdom) Ann Jones	(France) Françoise Dürr	6–3, 6–1

=== Japan Pro Series Osaka ===
Year	Location	Champions	Runners-up	Score
1969	Osaka	(United Kingdom) Ann Jones	(France) Françoise Dürr	6–2, 2–0, retd.
