= North Shore Championships =

Defunct tennis tournament
- Tour: ILTF World Circuit (1968–71); ILTF Independent Tour (1970-71) men
- Founded: 1968; 57 years ago
- Abolished: 1971; 54 years ago
- Location: Forrest Hill, Auckland, New Zealand
- Venue: North Shore Tennis Center
- Surface: Grass

The North Shore Championships also known as the Seabrook Fowlds North Shore Championships (for sponsorship reasons) and the North Shore Invitation for women in its final year. was an open international men's and women's grass court tennis tournament founded in 1968. It was first organised by the North Shore Tennis Association and first played at the North Shore Tennis Center, Forrest Hill, Auckland, New Zealand. This international tournament was part of the ILTF World Circuit until 1971 when it was discontinued.

== History ==
In February 1968 the North Shore Championships were established by the North Shore Tennis Association. In 1970 the New Zealand car maker Seabrook Fowlds Ltd, Auckland took over sponsorship of the event for two editions. In 1971 the tournament was branded as the North Shore Invitation. The tournament was played on outside grass courts at the North Shore Tennis Center, Forrest Hill, Auckland, New Zealand. This international tournament was part of the ILTF World Circuit until 1970 when it was discontinued.

== Finals ==
=== Men' singles ===
(incomplete roll)

North Shore Championships
Year	Champions	Runners-up	Score
1968	(New Zealand) Richard Hawkes	(New Zealand) Jim Mitchell	6-1, 6–3.
↓ Open era ↓
1969	(New Zealand) Onny Parun	(New Zealand) Jeff Simpson	6–2, 6–3.
Seabrook Fowlds North Shore Championships
1970	(United States) Bill Tym	(New Zealand) Onny Parun	6-3, 3–6, 6–4.
North Shore Championships
1971	(New Zealand) Onny Parun	(New Zealand) Jeff Simpson	6-2, 6–3.

=== Women's singles ===
(incomplete roll)

North Shore Championships
Year	Champions	Runners-up	Score
1968	(New Zealand) Beverley Vercoe	(New Zealand) Pam Rogan	6–4, 4–6, 6–4
↓ Open era ↓
1969	(Japan) Kimiyo Hatanaka	(Taiwan) Sei-Rei Cho	6–3, 6–3
Seabrook Fowlds North Shore Championships
1970	(United States) Alice Tym	(New Zealand) Robyn Legge	4–6, 6–4, 7–5
North Shore Invitation
1971	(New Zealand) Beverley Vercoe	(New Zealand) Jill Fraser	1–6, 6–2, 7–6

=== Women's doubles ===
(incomplete roll)

North Shore Championships
Year	Champions	Runners-up	Score
1968	(New Zealand) Pam Rogan (New Zealand) Beverley Vercoe	(New Zealand) Jill Bloxham (New Zealand) Helen Ward	6–2, 6–3
↓ Open era ↓
1969	(New Zealand) Shelley Monds (New Zealand) Elaine Stephan	(New Zealand) Cecily Mckillop (New Zealand) Tup Singer	5-7, 6–0 7–5
Seabrook Fowlds North Shore Championships
1970	(New Zealand) Elaine Stephan (New Zealand) Beverley Vercoe	(New Zealand) Cecilie Fleming (New Zealand) Robyn Legge	6–2, 6–2
North Shore Invitation
1971	(New Zealand) Cecelie Fleming (New Zealand) Patsy Stevens	(New Zealand) Jill Fraser (New Zealand) Beverley Vercoe	7–5, 6–4

=== Mixed doubles ===
(incomplete roll)

North Shore Championships
Year	Champions	Runners-up	Score
1968	(New Zealand) Beverley Vercoe	(New Zealand) Pam Rogan	6–4, 4–6, 6–4.
↓ Open era ↓
1969	(Japan) Koji Watanabe (Japan) Kimiyo Hatanaka	(Rhodesia) Hank Irvine (New Zealand) Beverly Vercoe	6–4, 6–4
Seabrook Fowlds North Shore Championships
1970	(New Zealand) Peter Beecroft (New Zealand) Elaine Stephan	(New Zealand) Paul Thomson (New Zealand) Beverley Vercoe	5–7, 6–1, 6–3
North Shore Invitation
1971	(New Zealand) Beverley Vercoe	(New Zealand) Jill Fraser	1–6, 6–2, 7–6
