= Carole Herrick =

American tennis player and author

- Full name: Carole Ann Loop Herrick
- Country (sports): United States
- Born: December 25, 1940 (age 84); Pasadena, California

Singles

Grand Slam singles results
- Wimbledon: 2R (1962)
- US Open: 3R (1967)

Carole Ann Loop Herrick (born December 25, 1940) is an American former professional tennis player.

Herrick grew up in Arcadia, California and played on the varsity team at Los Angeles State College as a teammate of Billie Jean King. She played twice in the singles main draw at Wimbledon (under her maiden name Loop). In 1967, she married her husband Philip Herrick. She is a member of the ITA Women's Collegiate Tennis Hall of Fame.

In her life after tennis, Herrick is the author of several books about the history of the Washington, D.C. area, and she has been an unsuccessful political candidate for Virginia's 34th House of Delegates district (as a Democrat).
