= 1967 Men's World Tennis Circuit =

Tennis tournament series

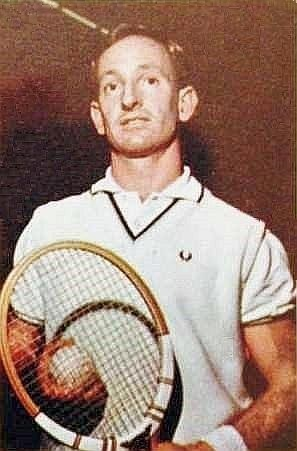
- Rod Laver completes the Pro Grand Slam winning all 3 Pro Majors, and the pro tennis tour title leader with 19 titles, and overall season titles leader.

Details
- Duration: 2 January – 18 December
- Edition: 54th (ILTF); 41st (Pro)
- Tournaments: 217
- Categories: Majors (7); Pro Tennis Tour (42); ILTF (178); Team & Games (2)

Achievements (singles)
- Most titles: (Australia) Rod Laver (19) Pro Tour
- Most finals: (Australia) Rod Laver (24) Pro Tour

The 1967 Men's World Tennis Circuit was an annual series of 217 tournaments composed of two subsidiary circuits the 41st Pro Tennis Tour (professional) and the 54th ILTF World Circuit (amateur). The season began in February in Sydney, Australia, and ended in December in Melbourne, Australia. It was the final season before the Open Era of tennis.

== History ==
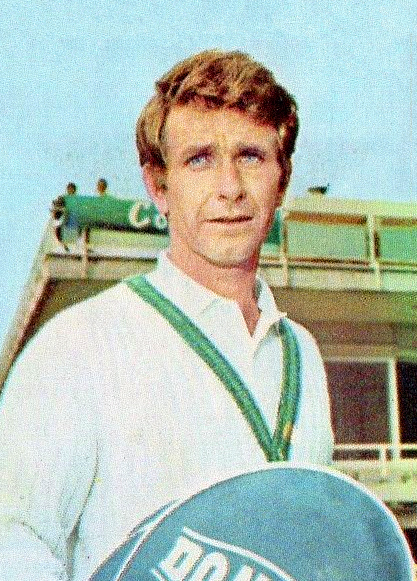
Martin Mulligan is the amateur ILTF World Circuit title leader winning 14 singles titles in 1967.

=== Amateur ===
From 1888 until 1912 Britain's Lawn Tennis Association (LTA), grew in status and influence to become the de facto international tennis governing body before the proper International Lawn Tennis Federation commenced operations. Despite the United States National Lawn Tennis Association (USNLTA) forming in 1881 a good seven years before the LTA, it was the British body that set laws, settled disputes and organized the increasingly complicated tournament calendar before the International Lawn Tennis Federation (ILTF) formed in March 1913. Prior to the creation of the International Lawn Tennis Federation and the establishment of its world championship events in 1913 the Wimbledon Championships, the U.S. National Championships, the Irish Lawn Tennis Championships and the Northern Championships were considered by players and historians as the four most important tennis tournaments to win, at least until 1902 when the Irish Championships lost that status leaving just three major events. In 1909 the Northern Championships then loses its status a major tournament leaving just two major events Wimbledon and United States National Championships. The Australasian Championships founded in 1906 started to gain major status in 1911, but was quickly replaced following the introduction of the World Hard Court Championships in 1912.

After the formation of the ILTF in 1913 the world tennis circuit going forward was a highly organised and structured network of national and international tournaments. Most tennis tournaments were usually mixed events for men and women, and the women's international tennis circuit certainly up to 1923 was composed mainly of tournaments on the British and European Circuits. After the USNLTA joined the ILTF this would later change with more and more tournaments being staged globally. Amateur tennis players on the ILTF World Circuit up to the open era were funded by their national associations enabling them to travel and take part in international tournaments worldwide.

After the formation of the ILTF the major amateur tennis championships, governed by the International Lawn Tennis Federation (ILTF), were the World Hard Court Championships, World Grass Court Championships (Wimbledon), and World Covered Court Championships. In 1923 the USLTA joined the ILTF on the basis of two compromises: the title 'World Championships' would be abolished, and wording would be 'for ever in the English language'. The World Championships were replaced by a new category of Official Championships for the main tournaments in Australia (Australian Championships), France, (French Championships) England, (Wimbledon Championships) and the United States (U.S. National Championships); now known as the four Grand Slam events.

=== Professional ===
In 1898 the first known professional tournament was held called the Paris Pro Championships. it was played at the Tennis Club de Paris. In 1900 a second professional tournament was held two years later called the Paris Exhibition Pro, it was played at the Cercle des Sports, Paris, France. In 1902 a few years later after the previous event another professional tournament was held called the Higgins Cup, all three events were won by Irishman Thomas P. Burke one of the world's first qualified tennis professionals, who was the father of Albert Burke. Professional tennis began to get established in the early 1910s with tournaments being held in Europe. In 1911 the German Pro Championships and Wiesbaden Pro Championships were held for the first time. It was followed by a World Pro Championships in 1924 and 1925. However the staging of one off tournaments began to change in 1926, when promoter Charles C. Pyle signed a handful of players as professionals he paid to compete during a four-month circuit in North America. Players included legendary French tennis player Suzanne Lenglen, alongside American Mary Browne, Vincent Richards, Harvey Snodgrass, and Howard Kinsey. In 1927 the first permanent Professional major was established the U.S. Pro Tennis Championships, followed by the French Pro Championship in 1930, then the Wembley Professional Championships in 1934, which later became known as the London Indoor Professional Championships (these collectively became known as the three Pro Majors or Professional Majors).

== Season summary ==
1967 tennis season began in January with the Manly Seaside Championships in Sydney, Australia an amateur ILTF World Circuit event won by Fred Stolle. In February the first event of the Pro Tennis Tour began with the Southern Pro Championships held in Sewanee, United States that was won by Earl Baumgardner.

In the amateur majors the first of which was Australian Championships held in late January at Memorial Drive Park in Adelaide, Australia Roy Emerson defeats Arthur Ashe to take the men's singles title. At the French Championships in May in Paris, the men's singles final is won by Roy Emerson who defeated Tony Roche. In June at the Wimbledon Championships John Newcombe emerges victorious against German player Wilhelm Bungert. In September at the final amateur major of the season the U.S. National Championships, the men's singles is won by Australian John Newcombe who defeats American player Clark Graebner in the final.

In a seismic announcement in June 1967 the All-England Tennis Club confirmed it would host the “Wimbledon World Professional Championships,” a three-day, eight-man pro tour event that would air on the BBC in August, though not a professional major it was by far biggest event on the pro tour in terms of prize money offered at a whopping $45,000 or $413,280 inflation adjusted at today's value. At the professional majors the first of which was the U.S. Pro Tennis Championships held in Chestnut Hill with $25,000 prize money on offer Rod Laver wins the singles title against Andrés Gimeno.

In August Rod Laver also wins the Wimbledon Pro. In October in Paris at the second pro slam event of the season the French Pro Championships Rod Laver picks up a second major title defeating Andrés Gimeno again in the final played at Stade Pierre de Coubertin on indoor wood courts. Later the same month Laver heads to England to compete at the third a final pro slam event of the season the $22,500 London Indoor Professional Championships event where he completes the "Professional Grand Slam", or "Pro Slam", by defeating Ken Rosewall in the final played at the Wembley Empire Pool.

In November the final event of the men's Pro Tennis Tour was the Belfast Pro Championships that was won by Ken Rosewall who defeats Lew Hoad in the final. In late December the final event of the amateur ILTF World Circuit is held the Copa Faulcombridge in Valencia, Spain that is won by Chilean player Ernesto Aguirre who defeats Spanish player Juan Gisbert Sr. This would be the last full season of two separate tennis circuits one for amateurs one for professionals. On 20 March 1968, at the Automobile Club in Paris, the International Lawn Tennis Federation (ILTF) votes to approve Open tennis worldwide. This then moves tennis into a full-fledged professional sport, offering prize money through sponsorship arrangements.

In September 1967 World Championship Tennis is founded by sports promoter David Dixon, who earlier witnessed the dreary conditions of the professional circuit before the open era when he visited a poorly promoted match between Rod Laver and Ken Rosewall. In August of that year, he had presented his idea of a pro tennis tour to Lamar Hunt and Al Hill Jr., who agreed to invest. WCT became the major professional tennis tour of players under contract of the early seventies. In December 1967 the first players sign contracts with WCT.

In April 1968 the Open Era of tennis began.

== Season results ==
Key

Legend

ILTF Grand Slam
ILTF World Circuit
Pro Slam
Pro Tennis Tour
Team & Games

=== January ===
Week	Tournament	Winner	Finalist	Semi finalist	Quarter finalist
2 Jan	Manly Seaside Championships; Manly LTC; Sydney, Australia; Grass - 32S; Singles - Doubles	(Australia) Fred Stolle; 6-3 10-8	(Australia) John Newcombe	(Belgium) Patrick Hombergen (Australia) Warren Jacques	(Australia) John Cottrill (Australia) Dick Crealy (Belgium) Claude De Gronckel (Australia) Ray J. Wilson
2 Jan	Eastern Province Championships; Port Elizabeth LTC; Port Elizabeth, South Africa; Hard - 64S; Singles - Doubles	(Australia) Martin Mulligan; 6-4 6-4 6-4	(South Africa) Bob Hewitt	(Australia) Ken Fletcher (Socialist Federal Republic of Yugoslavia) Niki Pilic	(South Africa) Robert Maud (South Africa) Frew McMillan (South Africa) Ray Moore (South Africa) Jackie Saul
2 Jan	Western Australian Championships; Royal Kings Park TC; Perth, Australia; Grass - 16S; Singles - Doubles	(Australia) Tony Roche; 6-3 1-6 9-7 9-7	(Australia) Bill Bowrey	(Australia) Owen Davidson (United States) Cliff Richey	(Australia) Brian Bowman (Australia) Anthony Hammond (United States) Jim McManus (Australia) Gary Penberthy
2 Jan	North Island Championships; Lower Hutt, New Zealand; Grass - 32S; Singles - Doubles	(United Kingdom) Mark Cox; 6-2 6-4	(New Zealand) Brian Fairlie	(New Zealand) Howard Broun (United Kingdom) Graham Stilwell	(New Zealand) Graeme Elliott (New Zealand) David B. Hawkes (United States) Joel Ross (New Zealand) Brian Young
2 Jan	Wellington Championships; Wellington, New Zealand; Grass - 32S; Singles - Doubles	(United Kingdom) Mark Cox; 9-7 6-2	(United Kingdom) Graham Stilwell	(New Zealand) Brian Fairlie (New Zealand) John B. Souter	(New Zealand) Robert G. Clarke (New Zealand) David B. Hawkes (New Zealand) Richard Hawkes (New Zealand) Brian Young
2 Jan	South Island Championships; Nelson, New Zealand; Grass; Singles - Doubles	(New Zealand) Onny Parun; 10-8 6-3 7-5	(New Zealand) Richard Hawkes	(New Zealand) Robert G. Clarke (New Zealand) John Lockington	
2 Jan	Eastern Indoor Championships (Note: Two editions of the Eastern Indoor Championships were held the first one in January, the second in March 1967.); Bergen Tennis Arena; Waldwick, United States; Wood (i); Singles - Doubles	(United States) Eugene Scott; 6–3, 6–3, 6–3	(United States) Frank Froehling III	(United States) Bob Barker (United States) Ned Weld	(United States) Ed Austin (United States) John F. Mangan, Jr (United States) Tony Lieberman (United States) Steve Turner
2 Jan	Concord International Indoor; Kiamesha Lake, United States; Carpet (i); Singles - Doubles	(United States) Bill Tully; 8–4	(United States) Claude René Schoenlank		
9 Jan	Western Province Championships; Glenhaven Tennis Club; Cape Town, South Africa; Hard - 48S; Singles - Doubles	(Socialist Federal Republic of Yugoslavia) Niki Pilic; 7-5 6-2 6-3	(Australia) Martin Mulligan	(Canada) Mike Belkin (South Africa) Peter van Lingen	(Brazil) Ronald Barnes (South Africa) Frew McMillan (South Africa) Quentin Pretorius (South Africa) Jackie Saul
9 Jan	Tasmanian Championships; Hobart, Australia; Grass; Singles - Doubles	(Australia) Tony Roche; 9-7 1-6 6-2 8-6	(United States) Arthur Ashe	(Australia) Bill Bowrey (United States) Cliff Richey	(Australia) Owen Davidson (United States) Jim McManus (Australia) Ray Ruffels (Jamaica) Richard Russell
9 Jan	New Zealand Championships; Wellington, New Zealand; Grass; Singles - Doubles	(United Kingdom) Mark Cox; 7-5 6-0 6-1	(New Zealand) Brian Fairlie	(New Zealand) Richard Hawkes (United Kingdom) Graham Stilwell	(New Zealand) Robert G. Clarke (New Zealand) John Lockington (New Zealand) Onny Parun (New Zealand) John Souter
9 Jan	South Florida Championships; West Palm Beach TC; West Palm Beach, United States; Clay; Singles - Doubles	(Ecuador) Eduardo Zuleta; 10-8 6-2	(Canada) Keith Carpenter	(Argentina) Tito Vázquez (United States) Wayne Van Voorhees	(United States) Hugh Curry (Brazil) Paulo Cleto (United States) Bill Stack (Brazil) Luis Felipe Tavares
16 Jan	Orange Free State Championships; Orange Free State LTC; Bloemfontein, South Africa; Clay - 64S; Singles - Doubles	(Australia) Martin Mulligan; 6-2 3-6 7-5	(South Africa) Bob Hewitt	(Australia) Ken Fletcher (United Kingdom) Stanley Matthews	(Italy) Giordano Majoli (South Africa) Frew McMillan (South Africa) Derek Schroder (United Kingdom) Keith Wooldridge
16 Jan	Asian International Championships; Madras, India; Clay; Singles - Doubles	(Soviet Union) Alexander Metreveli; 6-3 8-6 6-4	(Egypt) Ismail El Shafei	(Brazil) Thomaz Koch (India) Jaidip Mukerjea	(Australia) Bob Carmichael (Egypt) Mabrouk M. Ali (India) Premjit Lall (Brazil) José Edison Mandarino
16 Jan	Pierre Gillou International; Gillou, France; Wood (i); Singles - Doubles	(France) Jean-Claude Barclay; 6-3 8-6 6-4	(France) Michel Leclercq	(France) Pierre Darmon (France) François Jauffret	(France) Jean-Baptiste Chanfreau (France) Georges Goven (France) Bernard Montrenaud (France) Bernard Paul
23 Jan	West German Covered Court Championships; Cologne, West Germany; Wood (i); Singles - Doubles	(United Kingdom) Roger Taylor; 11-9 6-1	(France) Pierre Darmon	(West Germany) Adolf Kreinberg (West Germany) Hans-Joachim Plotz	(United Kingdom) Jaroslav Drobný (United Kingdom) John Roderick McDonald (Czechoslovakia) Jan Kukal (Netherlands) Tom Okker
23 Jan	Austin Smith Championships; Fort Lauderdale TC; Fort Lauderdale, United States; Clay; Singles - Doubles	(United States) Frank Froehling; 6-3 4-6 6-3	(Chile) Jaime Fillol	(United States) Ronald Holmberg (United States) Bill Tym	(Canada) Keith Carpenter (Greece) Nicholas Kalogeropoulos (United States) Gardnar Mulloy (Ecuador) Eduardo Zuleta
23 Jan	Australian Championships; Memorial Drive Park; Adelaide, Australia; Grand Slam; Grass; Singles - Doubles - Mix Doubles	(Australia) Roy Emerson; 6-4 6-1 6-4	(United States) Arthur Ashe	(Australia) John Newcombe (Australia) Tony Roche	(Australia) Bill Bowrey (United Kingdom) Mark Cox (Australia) Owen Davidson (United States) Cliff Richey
23 Jan	Australian Championships; Memorial Drive Park; Adelaide, Australia; Grand Slam; Grass; Singles - Doubles - Mix Doubles	(Australia) John Newcombe (Australia) Tony Roche; 3-6 6-3 7-5 6-8 8-6	(Australia) William Bowrey (Australia) Owen Davidson	(Australia) John Newcombe (Australia) Tony Roche	(Australia) Bill Bowrey (United Kingdom) Mark Cox (Australia) Owen Davidson (United States) Cliff Richey
23 Jan	Auckland Wills International; Auckland, New Zealand; Grass; Singles - Doubles	(Australia) Roy Emerson; 6-4 6-2 7-5	(Australia) Owen Davidson	(New Zealand) Richard Hawkes (United Kingdom) Mark Cox	(United Kingdom) Graham Stilwell (Sweden) Birger Folke (Belgium) Claude De Gronckel (Jamaica) Richard Russell
23 Jan	Richmond Invitational Indoor Championships; Richmond Arena; Carpet (i); Richmond, United States; Singles - Doubles	(Puerto Rico) Charlie Pasarell; 6-3 8-6	(United States) Arthur Ashe	(United States) Chuck McKinley (United States) Cliff Richey	(South Africa) Cliff Drysdale (United States) Frank Froehling III (United States) Ronald Holmberg (United States) Marty Riessen
23 Jan	Scandinavian Covered Court Championships; Stockholm, Sweden; Wood (i); Singles - Doubles	(Sweden) Jan-Erik Lundqvist; 6-2 7-5 6-4	(Sweden) Bo Holmstrom	(Sweden) Martin Carlstein (Soviet Union) Alexander Metreveli	(Sweden) Christer Holm (Soviet Union) Vladimir Korotkov (Finland) Pekka Saila (United Kingdom) Roger Taylor
23 Jan	Florida State Championships; Orlando, United States; Clay; Singles - Doubles	(Ecuador) Eduardo Zuleta; 6-4 6-4	(Canada) Keith Carpenter	(Ecuador) Lorrenzo Barrano (United States) Walter Oehrlein	(Brazil) Fernando Gentil (United States) James Pressly (United States) Bob Sherman (United States) Bill Tym
23 Jan	East German National Indoor Championships; Leipzig, East Germany; Wood (i); Singles - Doubles	(East Germany) Ulrich Trettin; 6-4 8-6	(East Germany) Horst Adolph Stahlberg		
23 Jan	East German National Indoor Championships; Leipzig, East Germany; Wood (i); Singles - Doubles	(East Germany) Hans-Jürgen Luttropp (East Germany) Hella Riede; 4-6 7-5 6-2	(East Germany) Peter Fährmann (East Germany) Bettina Borkert		
23 Jan	Los Angeles Metropolitan Championships; Griffith Riverside Tennis Facility; Los Angeles, United States; Hard; Singles - Doubles	(United States) Ed Grubb; 6–1, 6–0	(United States) Robert (Bob) Greene		
30 Jan	Natal Championships; Kershaw Park Tennis Stadium; Pietermaritzburg, South Africa; Hard - 64S; Singles - Doubles	(South Africa) Bob Hewitt; 6-3 4-6 6-2 6-4	(South Africa) Jackie Saul	(Brazil) Ronald Barnes (Australia) Ken Fletcher	(Canada) Mike Belkin (South Africa) Graydon Garner (Italy) Giordano Majoli (South Africa) Frew McMillan
30 Jan	Nice International Winter Championships; Nice LTC; Nice, France; Clay; Singles - Doubles	(West Germany) Bernd Kube; 6–3, 6–2	(France) Daniel Moreau		

=== February ===
Week	Tournament	Winner	Finalist	Semi finalist	Quarter finalist
6 Feb	Buffalo Mid-Winter Indoor Invitation; Buffalo, United States; Singles - Doubles	(United States) Clark Graebner; 3–6, 15–13, 6–0	(United States) Marty Riessen	(New Zealand) Ian Crookenden (United States) Chuck McKinley	(United States) Paul Cranis (United States) Eugene Scott (Australia) John Sharpe (United States) Bill Talbert
6 Feb	Philadelphia International Indoor Championships; Philadelphia, United States; Singles - Doubles	(United States) Arthur Ashe; 7–5, 9–7, 6–3	(Puerto Rico) Charlie Pasarell	(South Africa) Cliff Drysdale (United States) Stan Smith	(United Kingdom) Mark Cox (United States) Bob Lutz (Brazil) José Edison Mandarino (Netherlands) Tom Okker
13 Feb	City of Miami Invitation Championships; Henderson Park Tennis Club; Miami, United States; Singles - Doubles	(Greece) Nicholas Kalogeropoulos; 6–1, 9–7	(Canada) Frank Tutvin	(Canada) Keith Carpenter (West Germany) Jurgen Fassbender	(South Africa) Pat Cramer (Chile) Jaime Fillol (United States) Gardnar Mulloy (United States) Bill Tym
13 Feb	New South Wales Hard Court Championships; Gunnedah, Australia; Singles - Doubles	(Australia) Tony Roche; 6–2, 6–0	(Australia) Bill Bowrey	(Australia) Owen Davidson (Australia) Ray Ruffels	(Australia) Dick Crealy (Australia) Mick Marchment (Australia) Warren Jacques (Australia) Alan Stone
13 Feb	U.S. National Indoor Championships; Salisbury Civic Center; Salisbury, United States; Carpet (i); Singles - Doubles	(Puerto Rico) Charlie Pasarell; 13–11, 6–2, 2–6, 9–7	(United States) Arthur Ashe	(United States) Clark Graebnerr (United States) Cliff Richey	(United States) Bob Lutz (United States) Ron Holmberg (United States) Marty Riessen (United States) Stan Smith
13 Feb	U.S.S.R. National Indoor Championships; Moscow, Soviet Union; Wood (i); Singles - Doubles	(Soviet Union) Alex Metreveli; 4–6, 7–5, 6–4, 7–5	(Soviet Union) Toomas Leius	(Soviet Union) Mikhail Mozer (Soviet Union) Vladimir Korotkov	(Soviet Union) Teimuraz Kakulia (Soviet Union) Alexander Ivanov (Soviet Union) Sergei Likhachev (Soviet Union) Rudolf Sivokhin
13 Feb	Golden Gate Park Classic; Golden Gate Park TC; San Francisco, United States; Hard; Singles - Doubles	(United States) Tom Brown; 6–4, 6–1	(United States) Whitney Reed	(United States) Rich Anderson (Japan) Jun Kuki	(United States) Jack Darrah (United States) Erik van Dillen (United States) Tom Muench (United States) Greg Shephard
20 Feb	Concord International Indoor; Concord Resort Hotel; Kiamesha Lake, United States; Hard (i); Singles - Doubles	(United States) Arthur Ashe; 6–3, 2–6, 6–2	(Brazil) Thomaz Koch	(United States) Eugene Scott (Denmark) Torben Ulrich	(Brazil) Ronald Barnes (United States) Ron Holmberg (United States) Chuck McKinley (United Kingdom) Graham Stilwell
20 Feb	Southern Pro Championships; Old Providence S&RC; Sewanee, United States; Singles - Doubles	(United States) Earl Baumgardner; 1–6, 6–4, 6–3	(United States) Delmar Sylvia	(United States) Jim Nerren (United States) Jim Shaffer	(United States) Tom Buford (United States) Jerry Evert (United States) Ronnie Fenasci (United States) Jim Shakespeare
20 Feb	Southern Pro Championships; Old Providence S&RC; Sewanee, United States; Singles - Doubles	(United States) Earl Baumgardner (United States) Delmar Sylvia; 8–10, 6–3, 6–4	(United States) Wade Herren (United States) Jim Nerren	(United States) Jim Nerren (United States) Jim Shaffer	(United States) Tom Buford (United States) Jerry Evert (United States) Ronnie Fenasci (United States) Jim Shakespeare
20 Feb	Western Indoor Championships (37th ed); Cleveland, United States; Singles - Doubles	(United States) Arthur Ashe; 3–6, 6–3, 6–3	(United States) Clark Graebner	(United States) Dick Dell (United States) Brian Marcus	
20 Feb	French Covered Court Championships; Stade Pierre de Coubertin; Paris, France; Wood (i); Singles - Doubles	(Netherlands) Tom Okker; 6–2, 3–6, 6–3, 6–4	(Czechoslovakia) Jan Kodeš	(Denmark) Jorgen Ulrich (United Kingdom) Bobby Wilson	(France) Pierre Darmon | (Denmark) Carl Hedelund (France) François Jauffret (Czechoslovakia) Jan Kukal
24 Feb	New York Pro Championships; 71st Regiment Armory; New York, United States $15,000 - Wood (i) - 8S; Singles - Doubles	(Australia) Rod Laver; 7–5, 14–16, 7–5, 6–2	(United States) Pancho Gonzales	(United States) Earl Buchholz (Spain) Andrés Gimeno	(Australia) Fred Stolle (United States) Dennis Ralston (United Kingdom) Mike Davies (France) Pierre Barthes
24 Feb	New York Pro Championships; 71st Regiment Armory; New York, United States $15,000 - Wood (i) - 8S; Singles - Doubles	(United States) Pancho Gonzales (United States) Dennis Ralston; 7–5, 3–6, 6–3	(Australia) Rod Laver (Australia) Fred Stolle	(United States) Earl Buchholz (Spain) Andrés Gimeno	(Australia) Fred Stolle (United States) Dennis Ralston (United Kingdom) Mike Davies (France) Pierre Barthes
24 Feb	Beaulieu International Championships; Beaulieu Tennis Club; Beaulieu-sur-Mer, France; Clay; Singles - Doubles	(United Kingdom) Gerald Battrick; 6–1, 6–2	(United Kingdom) Peter William Curtis	(United Kingdom) John Clifton (West Germany) Bernd Kube	(United Kingdom) John Barrett (United Kingdom) Paul Hutchins (United Kingdom) Stanley Matthews (United Kingdom) Keith Wooldridge
24 Feb	St. Andrew International Invitation; St. Andrews Club; Kingston, Jamaica; Hard; Singles - Doubles	(Australia) Tony Roche; 6–4, 6–4	(Socialist Federal Republic of Yugoslavia) Niki Pilic	(United States) Ron Holmberg (India) Premjit Lall	(France) Daniel Contet (Belgium) Claude De Gronckel (Italy) Gaetano Di Maso (United Kingdom) Roger Taylor
24 Feb	Moscow International Indoor Championships; Moscow, Soviet Union; Wood (i); Singles - Doubles	(France) Pierre Darmon; 4–6, 17–15, 6–2, 2–6, 9–7	(Soviet Union) Alexander Metreveli	(France) Jean-Claude Barclay (Soviet Union) Toomas Leius	(Soviet Union) Aleksandr Ivanov (Soviet Union) Teimuraz Kakulia (Soviet Union) Viktor Korotkov (Soviet Union) Mikhail Mozer
24 Feb	Campionato Partenopeo; Circolo del Tennis di Napoli; Naples, Italy; Clay; Singles - Doubles	(Australia) Martin Mulligan; 6–2, 6–0	(Italy) Nicola Pietrangeli	(Chile) Jaime Pinto Bravo (Socialist Federal Republic of Yugoslavia) Boro Jovanović	(Australia) Bill Bowrey (Italy) Giuseppe Merlo (France) Bernard Montrenaud (Italy) Sergio Tacchini
24 Feb	New York Vanderbilt Indoor; Vanderbilt International Racket Club; New York, United States; Clay (i); Singles - Doubles	(Australia) John Newcombe; 3–6, 6–3, 3–1, retd	(United States) Arthur Ashe	(Brazil) José Edison Mandarino (Romania) Ion Țiriac	Round Robin (Brazil) Ronald Barnes (United States) Frank Froehling III (Hungary) Istvan Gulyas (United States) Chuck McKinley (Spain) Manuel Santana (United States) Eugene Scott
24 Feb	Western India Championships; Bombay Gymkhana Club; Bombay, India; Clay; Singles - Doubles	(India) Jaidip Mukerjea; 5–7, 4–6, 6–2, 6–3, 6–3	(Australia) Bob Carmichael	(Sweden) Lars Ölander (Japan) Osamu Ishiguro	(India) H.L. Das (India) Shyam Minotra (India) Ravi Venkatesan
24 Feb	Dixie International Championships; Davis Islands Courts; Tampa, United States; Clay; Singles - Doubles	(Hungary) István Gulyás; 3–6, 6–1, 2–6, 7–5, 2–0, retd.	(South Africa) Cliff Drysdale	(Socialist Federal Republic of Yugoslavia) Željko Franulović (Socialist Federal Republic of Yugoslavia) Niki Pilic	(Greece) Nicholas Kalogeropoulos (India) Premjit Lall (United Kingdom) Roger Taylor (Romania) Ion Țiriac
24 Feb	Pacific Coast Indoor Championships; San Rafael, United States; Carpet (i); Singles - Doubles	(Brazil) Thomaz Koch; 10–8, 7–5	(Spain) José Luis Arilla	(United States) William Crosby (United States) Chuck Darley	(United States) Norman Brookes (United States) Gil Howard (United States) Whitney Reed (United States) Mark Vance
24 Feb	Menton International; Menton, France; Clay; Singles - Doubles	(Austria) Dieter Schultheiss; 3–0 sets	(West Germany) Bernd Kube		

=== March ===
Week	Tournament	Winner	Finalist	Semi finalist	Quarter finalist
3 Mar	San Juan Pro Championships; San Juan, Puerto Rico $15000 - Hard - 8S; Singles - Doubles	(Australia) Rod Laver; 6-4, 3–6, 6-1	(Spain) Andrés Gimeno	(United States) Earl Buchholz (Chile) Luis Ayala	(United States) Dennis Ralston (France) Pierre Barthes (United Kingdom) Mike Davies (Australia) Fred Stolle
3 Mar	San Juan Pro Championships; San Juan, Puerto Rico $15000 - Hard - 8S; Singles - Doubles	(Australia) Rod Laver (Australia) Fred Stolle; 6-3 6-4	(United States) Earl Buchholz (United Kingdom) Mike Davies	(United States) Earl Buchholz (Chile) Luis Ayala	(United States) Dennis Ralston (France) Pierre Barthes (United Kingdom) Mike Davies (Australia) Fred Stolle
3 Mar	Colombian International; Barranquilla, Colombia; Clay; Singles - Doubles	(Australia) John Newcombe; 2-6, 6–3, 6–4, 6-4	(Australia) Tony Roche	(France) Daniel Contet (Romania) Ion Țiriac	(United Kingdom) Mark Cox (Socialist Federal Republic of Yugoslavia) Željko Franulović (France) Georges Goven (Hungary) Istvan Gulyas
3 Mar	Bavarian International Indoor Championships; Munich, West Germany; Wood (i); Singles - Doubles	(West Germany) Wilhelm Bungert; 7-5 4-6 6-4	(Czechoslovakia) Milan Holeček	(Australia) Bob Howe (Czechoslovakia) Jiri Javorsky	(West Germany) Frank Arendt (West Germany) Karl Meiler (West Germany) Bernd Loibl (West Germany) Bernd Weinmann
3 Mar	City of Perth Championships; Royal King's Park Tennis Club; Perth, Australia; Hard; Singles - Doubles	(Australia) Anthony Hammond; 6-4 6-2 6-1	(Australia) Henry Ladyman		
3 Mar	New England Indoor Championships; Randolph, United States; Wood (i); Singles - Doubles	(United States) Tony Vincent; 6–2, 6–4	(United States) Chauncey Steele III	(United States) Donald Manchester (United States) Larry Lewis	(United States) Rocky Jarvis (United States) John Levin (United States) Aram Miller (Canada) Rene Pelletier
3 Mar	United Arab Republic Championships; Cairo, Egypt; Clay; Singles - Doubles	(Sweden) Jan-Erik Lundquist; 6-4 6-4 6-2	(Egypt) Ismail El Shafei	(Spain) Manuel Orantes (Romania) Ilie Năstase	(Egypt) Mabrouk Mohammed Ali (Chile) Jaime Pinto Bravo (France) Bernard Montrenaud (United Kingdom) Michael Sangster
3 Mar	South-West Districts Championships; Warrnambool LTC; Warrnambool, Australia; Grass; Singles - Doubles	(Australia) Ray Ruffels; 6–4, 3–6, 8–6	(Australia) John Fraser		
3 Mar	Torneo Internazionale di Tennis Parioli; Rome, Italy; Clay; Singles - Doubles	(Italy) Nicola Pietrangeli; 0-6 7-5 6-4 11-13 6-4	(Australia) Martin Mulligan		
10 Mar	Orlando Professional Championships; Orlando, United States $15000 - Clay - 8S; Singles - Doubles	(Australia) Rod Laver; 6-4 2-6 6-0	(United States) Pancho Gonzales	(United States) Dennis Ralston (Spain) Andrés Gimeno	(United Kingdom) Mike Davies (United States) Earl Buchholz (Australia) Fred Stolle (France) Pierre Barthes
10 Mar	Orlando Professional Championships; Orlando, United States $15000 - Clay - 8S; Singles - Doubles	(Australia) Fred Stolle (Australia) Rod Laver; 4-6 7-5 6-1	(France) Pierre Barthes (Spain) Andrés Gimeno	(United States) Dennis Ralston (Spain) Andrés Gimeno	(United Kingdom) Mike Davies (United States) Earl Buchholz (Australia) Fred Stolle (France) Pierre Barthes
10 Mar	Alexandria International Championships; Alexandria Sporting Club; Alexandria, Egypt; Clay; Singles - Doubles	(Chile) Jaime Pinto-Bravo; 9-7 2-6 6-8 6-3 7-5	(Romania) Ilie Năstase		
10 Mar	Eastern Indoor Championships (Note: Two editions of the Eastern Indoor Championships were held the first one in January, the second in March 1967.); Bergen Tennis Arena; Waldwick, United States; Uniturf (i); Singles - Doubles	(United States) Donald Rubell; 6-3 6-2 6-4	(United States) Tony Vincent		
10 Mar	South of France Championships; Nice LTC; Nice, France; Clay; Singles - Doubles	(France) Jean-Pierre Courcol; 6–2, 2–6, 2–6, 6–3, 6–4	(Ecuador) Eduardo Zuleta		
10 Mar	Torneo Internazionale di Capri; Capri, Italy; Clay; Singles - Doubles	(Australia) Martin Mulligan; 7-5 6-3 6-3	(Poland) Wieslaw Gasiorek		
10 Mar	Altamira International; Caracas, Venezuela; Clay; Singles - Doubles	(Socialist Federal Republic of Yugoslavia) Niki Pilic; 4-6 7-5 6-0 4-6 6-1	(Mexico) Rafael Osuna		
10 Mar	Phoenix Thunderbird Invitation; Phoenix Country Club; Phoenix, United States; Hard; Singles - Doubles	(United States) Stan Smith; 7-5 6-3	(United States) Allen Fox		
10 Mar	South African Championships; Ellis Park Tennis Stadium; Johannesburg, South Africa; Hard; Singles - Doubles	(Spain) Manuel Santana; 2-6 6-2 4-6 6-3 6-4	(Denmark) Jan Leschly		
17 Mar	Planters Pro Challenge Cup; Flamingo Park; Miami Beach, United States $15000 - Clay - 8S; Singles - Doubles	(Australia) Rod Laver; 6-3 6-3	(Spain) Andrés Gimeno	(Australia) Fred Stolle (United States) Dennis Ralston	(United Kingdom) Mike Davies (United States) Earl Buchholz (United States) Pancho Gonzales (France) Pierre Barthes
17 Mar	Planters Pro Challenge Cup; Flamingo Park; Miami Beach, United States $15000 - Clay - 8S; Singles - Doubles	(Australia) Rod Laver (Australia) Fred Stolle; 6-4 3-6 6-4	(United States) Pancho Gonzales (United States) Dennis Ralston	(Australia) Fred Stolle (United States) Dennis Ralston	(United Kingdom) Mike Davies (United States) Earl Buchholz (United States) Pancho Gonzales (France) Pierre Barthes
17 Mar	Monte Carlo Championships; Monte Carlo Country Club; Monte Carlo, Monaco; Clay; Singles - Doubles	(Italy) Nicola Pietrangeli; 6-3 3-6 6-3 6-1	(Australia) Martin Mulligan		
17 Mar	Tally-Ho! Hard Courts; Edgbaston, England; Clay; Singles - Doubles	(United Kingdom) Geoffrey Paish; 9-7 4-6 6-3	(United Kingdom) D.R. Oliver		
24 Mar	Boston Garden Pro Championships; Boston Garden; Boston, United States $18000 - Wood (i) - 8S; Singles	(Australia) Rod Laver; 6-4 6-0	(Australia) Ken Rosewall	(United States) Dennis Ralston (United States) Earl Buchholz	(Australia) Fred Stolle (Spain) Andrés Gimeno (United States) Pancho Gonzales (France) Pierre Barthes
24 Mar	Canadian Professional Championships; Montreal Forum; Montreal, Canada $8000 - Wood (i) - 8S; Singles	(Australia) Rod Laver; 17-15 6-0	(United States) Dennis Ralston	(United States) Pancho Gonzales (Australia) Ken Rosewall	(France) Pierre Barthes (United States) Earl Buchholz (Spain) Andrés Gimeno (Australia) Fred Stolle
24 Mar	Golden Racket Trophy; Country Club Aixois; Aix-en-Provence, France; Clay; Singles - Doubles	(Soviet Union) Alexander Metreveli; 4-6 6-4 6-1	(Czechoslovakia) Jan Kodeš		
24 Mar	Pan American Championships (Note: This edition of the Pan American Championships was also valid as the 25th edition of the Mexican International Championships.); Centro Deportivo Chapultepec; Mexico City, Mexico; Clay; Singles - Doubles	(Australia) Tony Roche; 4-6 2-6 7-5 6-3 8-6	(Australia) John Newcombe		
24 Mar	Rhodesian International Championships; Salisbury, Rhodesia; Singles - Doubles	(Australia) Ken Fletcher; 10-8 6-1	(Australia) Owen Davidson		
24 Mar	Curaçao International Championships; Curaçao Sport Club; Willemstad, Curaçao; Hard; Singles - Doubles	(Australia) Tony Roche; 3-6, 4–6, 9–7, 6–1, 6-1	(United Kingdom) Roger Taylor		
24 Mar	North of England Hard Court Championships; Argyle Lawn Tennis Club; Southport, England; Clay; Singles - Doubles	(United Kingdom) Billy Knight; 6–3, 6-4	(New Zealand) John Roderick McDonald		

=== April ===
Week	Tournament	Winner	Finalist	Semi finalist	Quarter finalist
31 Mar - 6 Apr	BBC2 Pro Championships; Wembley, London, Great Britain $14000 - Wood (i) - 4S; Singles - Doubles	(Australia) Ken Rosewall; 6-4 6-2	(United States) Dennis Ralston	(United States) Pancho Gonzales (Australia) Rod Laver	
31 Mar - 6 Apr	Paris Pro Championships; Paris, France; Wood (i) - 6S; Singles - Doubles	(Australia) Rod Laver; 6-0 10-8 10-8	(Australia) Ken Rosewall	(Australia) Fred Stolle (United States) Dennis Ralston	(France) Pierre Barthes (United States) Pancho Gonzales
31 Mar - 6 Apr	Paris Pro Championships; Paris, France; Wood (i) - 6S; Singles - Doubles	(Australia) Rod Laver (Australia) Ken Rosewall; 6-3 6-4	(Australia) Fred Stolle (France) Pierre Barthes	(Australia) Fred Stolle (United States) Dennis Ralston	(France) Pierre Barthes (United States) Pancho Gonzales
31 Mar - 6 Apr	Caribe Hilton International Championships; Caribe Hilton Hotel; San Juan, Puerto Rico; Hard; Singles - Doubles	(Australia) Tony Roche; 6-2 6-4	(Puerto Rico) Charlie Pasarell		
31 Mar - 6 Apr	Mexican International; Mexico City, Mexico; Clay; Singles - Doubles	(Australia) Tony Roche; 4–6, 2–6, 7- 5, 6–3, 8-6	(Australia) John Newcombe		
31 Mar - 6 Apr	Cannes International Championships; Cannes, France; Clay; Singles - Doubles	(Czechoslovakia) Jan Kodeš; 6-0 6-1	(Romania) Ilie Năstase		
31 Mar - 6 Apr	San Luis Potosi International; Club Deportivo Potosino; San Luis Potosí Mexico; Clay; Singles - Doubles	(Mexico) Joaquín Loyo-Mayo; 6-2 6-2	(France) Daniel Contet		
31 Mar - 6 Apr	Long Island Indoor Championships; LIU Post College Tennis Center; Brookville, United States; Carpet - (Astroturf) (i); Singles - Doubles	(United States) Arthur Ashe; 1st	(United States) Eugene Scott; 2nd		Round Robin (United States) Frank Froehling III (United States) Chuck McKinley
7 Apr	Brussels Pro Championships; Brussels, Belgium; Wood (i) - 4S; Singles - Doubles	(Australia) Fred Stolle; 6-3 6-4	(United States) Dennis Ralston	(France) Pierre Barthes (Australia) Rod Laver	
7 Apr	Brussels Pro Championships; Brussels, Belgium; Wood (i) - 4S; Singles - Doubles	(Australia) Fred Stolle (United States) Dennis Ralston; 8-6 9-7	(France) Pierre Barthes (Australia) Rod Laver	(France) Pierre Barthes (Australia) Rod Laver	
7 Apr	Lyon Pro Championships; Lyon, France; Wood (i) - 4S; Singles	(Australia) Fred Stolle; 6-1 3-6 6-4	(Australia) Rod Laver	(United States) Dennis Ralston (France) Pierre Barthes	
7 Apr	Carlton Club International; Cannes, France; Clay; Singles - Doubles	(Romania) Ilie Năstase; 7-5 4-6 6-2	(Romania) Peter Marmureanu		
7 Apr	Campionati Internazionali di Sicilia; Palermo, Italy; Clay; Singles - Doubles	(Soviet Union) Alexander Metreveli; 7-5 6-4 6-4	(Canada) Michael Belkin		
7 Apr	Israel Silver Jubilee International Invitation; Tel Aviv, Israel; Clay; Singles - Doubles	(Australia) Dick Crealy; 7-5 6-4 6-411-9 3-0 ret.	(Australia) Terry Addison		
7 Apr	San Antonio Invitational; San Antonio, United States; Singles - Doubles	(Australia) John Newcombe; 6-3 6-2	(Australia) Tony Roche		
7 Apr	Cumberland Hard Court Championships; Hampstead, England; Clay; Singles - Doubles	(United Kingdom) Gerald Battrick; 7-5 6-4	(Canada) Keith Carpenter		
7 Apr	St. Petersburg Masters Invitational; St. Petersburg, United States; Clay; Singles - Doubles	(United States) Allen Fox; 6-3 3-6 6-4 4-6 6-2	(Socialist Federal Republic of Yugoslavia) Niki Pilic		
7 Apr	San Jose State All-Comers Championship; Spartan Tennis Complex; San Jose, United States; Hard; Singles - Doubles	(United States) Greg Shephard; 6–4, 6–3	(United States) Rich Anderson		
14 Apr	Marseille Pro Championships (spring edition); Marseille, France; Clay - 4S; Singles - Doubles	(Australia) Rod Laver; 2-6 9-7 11-9	(United States) Dennis Ralston	(Australia) Fred Stolle (France) Pierre Barthes	
14 Apr	Marseille Pro Championships (spring edition); Marseille, France; Clay - 4S; Singles - Doubles	(Australia) Fred Stolle (Australia) Rod Laver; 6-3 11-9	(United States) Dennis Ralston (France) Pierre Barthes	(Australia) Fred Stolle (France) Pierre Barthes	
14 Apr	Northern California Championships; San Francisco, United States; Hard; Singles - Doubles	(United States) Jeff Borowiak; 6-1 7-5 2-6 2-6 13-11	(United States) Richard W. Anderson		
14 Apr	Surrey Hard Court Championships (Note: This edition of the Surrey Hard Court Championships was also co-valid as the Sutton Hard Court Championships for the 1967 season.); Sutton, England; Clay; Singles - Doubles	(United Kingdom) Stanley Matthews; 4-6 6-4 6-1	(United Kingdom) Keith Wooldridge		
14 Apr	River Plate Championships; Buenos Aires, Argentina; Clay; Singles - Doubles	(United States) Cliff Richey; 3-6 6-4 7-5	(United States) Clark Graebner		
14 Apr	Internazionale di Catania; Catania, Italy; Clay; Singles - Doubles	(Australia) Martin Mulligan; 3-6 6-1 6-1	(Italy) Nicola Pietrangeli		
14 Apr	River Oaks International Tennis Tournament; Houston, United States; Clay; Singles - Doubles	(Australia) John Newcombe; 6-2 7-5 6-3	(Australia) Tony Roche		
14 Apr	Madrid International; Madrid, Spain; Singles - Doubles	(Sweden) Jan-Erik Lundquist; 3-6 6-3 6-3 6-4	(Australia) Roy Emerson		
21 Apr	British Hard Court Championships; Bournemouth, England; Clay; Singles - Doubles	(Sweden) Jan-Erik Lundquist; 6-1 6-8 6-3 6-2	(South Africa) Bob Hewitt		
21 Apr	Dallas Invitational; Dallas, United States; Hard; Singles - Doubles	(Australia) Tony Roche; 4-6 10-8 6-2 14-12	(United States) Ron Holmberg		
21 Apr	Miami Beach Invitational; Miami Beach, United States; Clay; Singles - Doubles	(United States) Martin Schad; 6-2 6-0	(Peru) Lorenzo Barreno		
21 Apr	Campionato Partenopeo; Naples, Italy; Clay; Singles - Doubles	(Australia) Martin Mulligan; 5-7 4-6 6-0 6-1 6-0	(Italy) Nicola Pietrangeli		
21 Apr	Connaught Hard Court Championships; Connaught LTC; Chingford, England; Clay; Singles - Doubles	(Sweden) Birger Folke; 6-3, 2–6, 14-12	(Sweden) Lars Ölander		

=== May ===
Week	Tournament	Winner	Finalist	Semi finalist	Quarter finalist
28 Apr - 4 May	Birmingham Pro Classic; Birmingham, United States; Hard - 16S; Singles - Doubles	(United States) Pancho Gonzales; 6-4 6-2	(United Kingdom) Alan Mills	(United Kingdom) Mike Davies (United States) Sam Giammalva	(United States) Earl Baumgardner (United States) Earl Buchholz (United States) Crawford Henry (United States) Delmar Sylvia
28 Apr - 4 May	Birmingham Pro Classic; Birmingham, United States; Hard - 16S; Singles - Doubles	(United States) Sam Giammalva (United States) Crawford Henry; 6-4 2-6 6-3	(United States) Earl Buchholz (United States) Wade Herren	(United Kingdom) Mike Davies (United States) Sam Giammalva	(United States) Earl Baumgardner (United States) Earl Buchholz (United States) Crawford Henry (United States) Delmar Sylvia
28 Apr - 4 May	Atlanta Invitational; Atlanta, United States; Singles - Doubles	(United States) Marty Riessen; 7-5 6-2 6-4	(United States) Cliff Richey	(United States) Arthur Ashe (Puerto Rico) Charlie Pasarell	(United States) Zan Guerry (United States) Allen Morris (United States) Armistead Neely (United States) Walter R. Johnson
28 Apr - 4 May	London Hard Court Championships; Hurlingham Club; Hurlingham, England; Clay; Singles - Doubles	(United Kingdom) Paul Hutchins; 6-2 6-3	(United Kingdom) Stanley Matthews	(United Kingdom) Gerald Battrick (United Kingdom) Ken Weatherley	(Australia) John Cottrill (United States) Bill Hoogs Jr. (Australia) Bob Howe (Australia) Ray Keldie
28 Apr - 4 May	California State Championships; Portola Valley, United States; Hard; Singles - Doubles	(Australia) Tony Roche; 6-3 6-2 8-6	(Australia) John Newcombe	(United States) Allen Fox (United States) Ron Holmberg	(United States) Chuck Darley (United States) Jim McManus (United States) David Reed (United States) Whitney Reed
28 Apr - 4 May	Internazionale di Reggio Calabria; Circolo Tennis Rocco Polimeni; Reggio Calabria, Italy; Clay; Singles - Doubles	(Italy) Giuseppe Merlo; 4-6 6-1 6-4 6-1	(Australia) Owen Davidson	(France) Jean-Pierre Courcol (France) Bernard Montrenaud	(Australia) Bill Bowrey (Ecuador) Pancho Guzmán (India) Ramanathan Krishnan (Italy) Sergio Palmieri
28 Apr - 4 May	Pensacola Invitational; Pensacola, United States; Clay; Singles - Doubles	(United States) Ron Holmberg; 7-5 6-0	(Australia) Robert Brien	(United States) Armistead Neely (Australia) Graham Primrose	(United States) Steve Beeland (United States) John Edmond (United States) Greg A. Hilley (United States) Pierce Kelley
28 Apr - 4 May	Paris International Championships; Stade Roland Garros; Paris, France; Clay; Singles - Doubles	(France) Pierre Darmon; 4-6 6-1 6-4 6-1	(France) François Jauffret	(France) Daniel Contet (France) Georges Goven	(France) Patrice Beust (Australia) John Cooper (France) clercq (France) Bernard Paul
28 Apr - 4 May	Ojai Valley Championships; Ojai, United States; Hard; Singles - Doubles	(United States) John Yeomans; 6-1 7-5 2-6 2-6 13-11	(United States) Tom Leonard	(United States) Steve Avoyer (United States) Brian Cheney	(United States) Dick Leach (Japan) Jun Kuki (United States) Jim Rombeau (United States) John Spiegel
11 May	Pacific Pro Championships; San Diego, United States; Wood (i); Singles - Doubles	(Australia) Rod Laver; 6-4 12-10	(United States) Dennis Ralston	(United States) Butch Buchholz (United Kingdom) Mike Davies	(France) Pierre Barthes (Ecuador) Pancho Segura (Australia) Fred Stolle (United States) Alex Olmedo
11 May	Pacific Pro Championships; San Diego, United States; Wood (i); Singles - Doubles	(Australia) Fred Stolle (Australia) Rod Laver; 10-5	(United States) Earl Buchholz (United Kingdom) Mike Davies	(United States) Butch Buchholz (United Kingdom) Mike Davies	(France) Pierre Barthes (Ecuador) Pancho Segura (Australia) Fred Stolle (United States) Alex Olmedo
11 May	Southern California Championships; Los Angeles Tennis Club; Los Angeles, United States; Hard; Singles - Doubles	(United States) Stan Smith; 7-5 13-11	(United States) Allen Fox		
11 May	West Berlin International Championships; West Berlin, West Germany; Clay; Singles - Doubles	(Australia) Roy Emerson walkover	(Spain) Manuel Santana		
11 May	Charlotte Invitation; Charlotte, United States; Hard; Singles - Doubles	(United States) Ron Holmberg; 6-4 6-2	(United States) Vic Seixas		
11 May	Surrey Hard Court Championships; Guildford, England; Clay; Singles - Doubles	(Colombia) William Alvarez; 6-4 6-2	(Colombia) Iván Molina		
11 May	Italian International Championships; Foro Italico; Rome, Italy; Clay; Singles - Doubles	(Australia) Martin Mulligan; 6-3 0-6 6-4 6-1	(Australia) Tony Roche		
11 May	Italian International Championships; Foro Italico; Rome, Italy; Clay; Singles - Doubles	(South Africa) Bob Hewitt (South Africa) Frew McMillan; 6-3 2-6 6-3 9-7	(Australia) Bill Bowrey (Australia) Owen Davidson		
11 May	Leverkusen International; Leverkusen, West Germany; Clay; Singles - Doubles	(West Germany) Wilhelm Bungert walkover	(Australia) Dick Crealy	(Australia) Bob Carmichael (Australia) Jim Moore	(Australia) John Cooper (Australia) John Cottrill (New Zealand) Ron McKenzie (Sweden) Lars Ölander
19 May	Rothmans Grass Court Invitation Roehampton; Roehampton Club; Roehampton, England; Grass; Singles - Doubles	(Australia) Tony Roche; 6-1 2-6 6-3	(India) Premjit Lall		
19 May	Sassari International; Sassari, Italy; Clay Singles - Doubles	(Socialist Federal Republic of Yugoslavia) Boro Jovanović; 6-4 6-3 1-6 4-6 6-3	(Australia) Martin Mulligan		
19 May	La Rasante International; Brussels, Belgium; Clay; Singles - Doubles	(Australia) Roy Emerson; 6-3 3-6 7-5 6-4	(Netherlands) Tom Okker		
19 May	Bay Counties Championships; Tiburon Peninsula Club; Tiburon, United States; Clay; Singles - Doubles	(United States) Jim McManus; 6-2 6-2	(United States) Whitney Reed	(United States) Erik van Dillen (United States) Bobby Siska	(United States) Gil Howard (United States) Hank Jungle (United States) Don Jacobus (United States) Gene Ward
19 May	International Championships of the Ruhr; Essen, West Germany; Clay; Singles - Doubles	(West Germany) Bernd Weinmann; 3-6 6-3 6-0	(India) Jaidip Mukerjea	(Canada) Keith Carpenter (Australia) Dick Crealy	(Australia) John Cooper (West Germany) Uwe Gottschalk (West Germany) Lothar Pawlik (Sweden) Lars Ölander
26 May	Los Angeles Pro Championships; Los Angeles, United States $20000 - Hard - 14S (Round Robin); Singles - Doubles	(Australia) Ken Rosewall; 6-2 2-6 7-5	(Australia) Rod Laver	(United States) Dennis Ralston (United States) Earl Buchholz	Round Robin (Australia) Malcolm Anderson (Spain) Andrés Gimeno (United States) Alex Olmedo (United States) Barry MacKay (United Kingdom) Mike Davies (Ecuador) Pancho Segura (United States) Hugh Stewart (Chile) Luis Ayala (Australia) Fred Stolle (France) Pierre Barthes
26 May	Los Angeles Pro Championships; Los Angeles, United States $20000 - Hard - 14S (Round Robin); Singles - Doubles	(Australia) Ken Rosewall (United States) Dennis Ralston; 6-3 6-4	(United States) Earl Buchholz (United Kingdom) Mike Davies	(United States) Dennis Ralston (United States) Earl Buchholz	Round Robin (Australia) Malcolm Anderson (Spain) Andrés Gimeno (United States) Alex Olmedo (United States) Barry MacKay (United Kingdom) Mike Davies (Ecuador) Pancho Segura (United States) Hugh Stewart (Chile) Luis Ayala (Australia) Fred Stolle (France) Pierre Barthes
26 May	French Championships; Stade Roland Garros; Paris, France; Grand Slam; Clay - 128S; Singles - Doubles	(Australia) Roy Emerson; 6-1 6-4 2-6 6-2	(Australia) Tony Roche		
26 May	French Championships; Stade Roland Garros; Paris, France; Grand Slam; Clay - 128S; Singles - Doubles	(Australia) John Newcombe (Australia) Tony Roche; 6-3 9-7 12-10	(Australia) Roy Emerson (Australia) Ken Fletcher		
26 May	Worcestershire Championships; Manor Park SC; Malvern, England; Grass; Singles - Doubles	(Sweden) Lars Olander; 9-7 10-8	(Japan) Koji Watanabe		
26 May	St. Annes Open; St. Anne's LTC; Lytham St Annes, England; Grass; Singles - Doubles	(India) Premjit Lall; 4-6 6-3 6-3	(South Africa) Peter Mors		
29 May	Pacific Coast Pro Championships; Berkeley, USA $20000 - Hard - 13S; Singles - Doubles	(Australia) Ken Rosewall; 4-6 6-3 8-6	(Australia) Rod Laver	(United States) Alex Olmedo (Spain) Andrés Gimeno	(United States) Earl Buchholz (Ecuador) Pancho Segura (France) Pierre Barthes (United Kingdom) Mike Davies
29 May	Pacific Coast Pro Championships; Berkeley, USA $20000 - Hard - 13S; Singles - Doubles	(United States) Dennis Ralston (Australia) Ken Rosewall; 2-6 6-4 6-2	(Australia) Rod Laver (Australia) Fred Stolle	(United States) Alex Olmedo (Spain) Andrés Gimeno	(United States) Earl Buchholz (Ecuador) Pancho Segura (France) Pierre Barthes (United Kingdom) Mike Davies
29 May	Glamorgan County Championships; Cardiff, Wales; Singles - Doubles	(Canada) Keith Carpenter; 6-4 4-6 6-3	(Japan) Keishiro Yanagi		
29 May	Surrey Championships; Surbiton LTC; Surbiton, England; Grass; Singles - Doubles	(United Kingdom) Roger Taylor; 2-6 6-4 6-2	(United Kingdom) Bobby Wilson		
29 May	U.S. Hard Court Championships; Sacramento, United States; Hard; Singles - Doubles	(United States) Stan Smith; 6-4 6-3	(United States) Gary Rose		
29 May	Tulsa Invitation; Tulsa, United States; Clay; Singles - Doubles	(United States) Cliff Richey; 6-2 6-1	(United States) Clark Graebner		
29 May	Helsinki International; Helsinki, Finland; Singles - Doubles	(Australia) Martin Mulligan; 6-0 8-6	(India) Ramanathan Krishnan		
29 May	Connecticut State Open Championships; New Haven Lawn Club; New Haven, United States; Grass; Singles - Doubles	(United States) Ned Weld; 6-0 7-5	(United States) Peter Fishbach	(United States) Richard Raskind (United States) Gerald Slobin	(United States) Jon Buchman (United States) William Ewen (United States) Vernon Morgan (United States) Steve Ogilvy

=== June ===
Week	Tournament	Winner	Finalist	Semi finalist	Quarter finalist
5 Jun	Madison Square Garden Pro Championships; New York, USA $25000 - Wood (i) - 13S; Singles	(Australia) Rod Laver; 6-4 6-4	(Australia) Ken Rosewall		
5 Jun	Madison Square Garden Pro Championships; New York, USA $25000 - Wood (i) - 13S; Singles	(Australia) Ken Rosewall (United States) Dennis Ralston; 6-4 6-4	(Australia) Rod Laver (Australia) Fred Stolle		
5 Jun	Long Island Championships; Great Neck, United States; Singles - Doubles	(United States) Eugene Scott; 9-7 6-4 7-9 6-2	(United States) Peter Fishbach		
5 Jun	Lowther Open; Lowther LTC; Barnes, England; Grass - 32S; Singles - Doubles	(India) Shyam Minotra; 9-7 6-4 7-9 6-2	(United States) Peyton Watson	(Monaco) Patrick Landau (Argentina) Raul Peralta	(United Kingdom) Freddy Field (United Kingdom) Nick de Grunwald (South Africa) Colin Rees (Canada) Frank Tutvin
5 Jun	Northern Championships; Northern LTC; Manchester, England; Grass - 48S; Singles - Doubles	(Australia) Owen Davidson; 6-1 6-8 6-4	(Australia) Ray Ruffels		
5 Jun	Saltsjöbaden International; Saltsjöbaden, Sweden; Clay - 16S; Singles - Doubles	(Australia) Martin Mulligan	(Sweden) Jan-Erik Lundquist		
5 Jun	West of Scotland Championships; Whitecraigs Tennis&Sports Club; Glasgow, Scotland; Grass - 32S; Singles - Doubles	(Australia) Terry Addison; 6-1 6-8 6-4	(Australia) Ray Keldie		
12 Jun	U.S. Pro Hard Court Championships; St. Louis, United States $19000 - Hard - 16S; Singles - Doubles	(Australia) Ken Rosewall; 6-3 6-4	(Spain) Andrés Gimeno		
12 Jun	Blue Gray Invitation; Montgomery Country Club; Montgomery, United States; Clay - 24S; Singles - Doubles	(Canada) Michael Belkin; 9-11 7-5 6-2	(United States) Herb S. Fitzgibbon		
12 Jun	Trofeo Conde de Godó; Real Club de Tenis Barcelona; Barcelona, Spain; Singles - Doubles	(Australia) Martin Mulligan; 5-7 7-5 6-4 6-3	(Mexico) Rafael Osuna		
12 Jun	Trofeo Conde de Godó; Real Club de Tenis Barcelona; Barcelona, Spain; Singles - Doubles	(Brazil) Thomaz Koch (Brazil) Jose Mandarino; 6-2 6-4 8-6	(India) Ramanathan Krishnan (Mexico) Rafael Osuna		
12 Jun	Kent Championships; Beckenham Lawn Tennis Club; Beckenham, England; Grass; Singles - Doubles	(Australia) Owen Davidson; 3-6 6-2 6-3	(Australia) Ken Fletcher		
12 Jun	West of England Championships; Bristol, England; Grass; Singles - Doubles	(Netherlands) Tom Okker; 6-2 5-7 8-6	(South Africa) Cliff Drysdale		
12 Jun	U.S. National Intercollegiate Championships; SIU Courts; Carbondale, USA; Singles - Doubles	(United States) Bob Lutz; 6-0 6-0 8-10 2-6 6-2	(Chile) Jaime Fillol		
12 Jun	Nottinghamshire Championships; Nottingham Castle LTC; Nottingham, England; Grass; Singles - Doubles	(New Zealand) Brian Fairlie; 6-4 7-5	(United Kingdom) Mark Cox		
12 Jun	Lys International Grass Court Championships; Club du Lys Chantilly; Lys-Chantilly, France; Grass; Singles - Doubles	(Spain) Manuel Santana; 5-7 9-7 6-3 6-3	(Australia) Roy Emerson		
12 Jun	Merseyside Open; Vagabonds LTC; West Derby, England; Grass; Singles - Doubles	(Australia) John Brown; 6-1 3-6 6-3	(West Germany) Hans-Joachim Plötz	(Socialist Federal Republic of Yugoslavia) Nikola Špear (United States) Bill Tym	(Australia) John Blizard (Netherlands) Nick Fleury (United Kingdom) Richard Greene (United Kingdom) Geoff W. Stubbs
19 Jun	Newport Beach Pro Championships; Newport Beach, United States $25000 - Hard - 12S; Singles - Doubles	(Australia) Ken Rosewall; 6-3 6-3	(Australia) Rod Laver		
19 Jun	Newport Beach Pro Championships; Newport Beach, United States $25000 - Hard - 12S; Singles - Doubles	(Australia) Rod Laver (Australia) Fred Stolle	(Australia) Ken Rosewall (United States) Dennis Ralston		
19 Jun	Liberation Cup; Ostrava, Czechoslovakia; Clay; Singles - Doubles	(Czechoslovakia) Karol Safarik; 6-2 6-1	(Czechoslovakia) Pavel Brejcha		
19 Jun	Southern Championships; Birmingham, United States; Clay; Singles - Doubles	(United States) Herb Fitzgibbon; 6-2 6-1	(United States) John Powless		
19 Jun	London Grass Court Championships; Queen's Club, West Kensington, England; Grass; Singles - Doubles	(Australia) John Newcombe; 7-5 6-3	(United Kingdom) Roger Taylor		
26 Jun	World Pro Championships; Oklahoma City, USA $15000 - Hard - 12S; Singles - Doubles	(Australia) Rod Laver; 6-2 3-6 6-4	(Australia) Ken Rosewall		
26 Jun	World Pro Championships; Oklahoma City, USA $15000 - Hard - 12S; Singles - Doubles	(Australia) Ken Rosewall (United States) Dennis Ralston; 10-8	(Australia) Rod Laver (Australia) Fred Stolle		
26 Jun	Tennessee Valley Invitational; Chattanooga, United States; Clay; Singles - Doubles	(Chile) Jaime Fillol; 6-4 4-6 7-5	(Mexico) Joaquín Loyo-Mayo		
26 Jun	New York State Championships; North Shore Tennis & Racquet Club; Queens, NY United States; Clay; Singles - Doubles	(United States) Peter Fishbach; 6-3 0-6 3-6 6–2, retd.	(United States) Butch Seewagen	(United States) Bob Barker (United States) Steve Stockton	(United States) Stuart Ludlum (United States) Tom Roesch (United States) Steve Turner (United States) Tony Vincent

=== July ===
Week	Tournament	Winner	Finalist	Semi finalist	Quarter finalist
3 July	Cincinnati Pro Championships; University of Cincinnati Tennis Club; Cincinnati, United States $15000 - Hard - 12S; Singles - Doubles	(Spain) Andrés Gimeno; 6-3 7-5	(Australia) Ken Rosewall		
3 July	Cincinnati Pro Championships; University of Cincinnati Tennis Club; Cincinnati, United States $15000 - Hard - 12S; Singles - Doubles	(Australia) Rod Laver (Australia) Fred Stolle; 4-6 8-6 7-5	(Australia) Ken Rosewall (United States) Dennis Ralston		
3 July	Tri-State Championships; University of Cincinnati Tennis Club; Cincinnati, United States; Clay; Singles - Doubles	(Mexico) Joaquín Loyo-Mayo; 8-6 6-1	(Chile) Jaime Fillol		
3 July	Tri-State Championships; University of Cincinnati Tennis Club; Cincinnati, United States; Clay; Singles - Doubles	(United States) William Brown (India) Jasjit Singh; 6-1 9-7	(United States) Richard Knight (United States) Tom Gorman		
3 July	Wimbledon Championships; AELTC; Wimbledon, England; Grand Slam; Grass - 128S; Singles - Doubles - Mix Doubles	(Australia) John Newcombe; 6-3 6-1 6-1	(West Germany) Wilhelm P. Bungert	(Socialist Federal Republic of Yugoslavia) Nikola Pilić (United Kingdom) Roger Taylor	(Australia) John Cooper (Australia) Ken Fletcher (Brazil) Thomaz Koch (Australia) Ray Ruffels
3 July	Wimbledon Championships; AELTC; Wimbledon, England; Grand Slam; Grass - 128S; Singles - Doubles - Mix Doubles	(South Africa) Bob Hewitt (South Africa) Frew McMillan; 6-2 6-3 6-4	(Australia) Roy Emerson (Australia) Ken Fletcher	(Socialist Federal Republic of Yugoslavia) Nikola Pilić (United Kingdom) Roger Taylor	(Australia) John Cooper (Australia) Ken Fletcher (Brazil) Thomaz Koch (Australia) Ray Ruffels
10 Jul	U.S. Pro Tennis Championships (Note: The 1967 edition of the U.S. Pro Tennis Championships was also valid as the US Pro Grasscourt Championships that year.); Chestnut Hill, United States; Pro Slam $25000 - Grass - 16S; Singles - Doubles	(Australia) Rod Laver; 4-6 6-4 6-3 7-5	(Spain) Andrés Gimeno	(Australia) Ken Rosewall (Australia) Fred Stolle	(Chile) Luis Ayala (United Kingdom) Mike Davies (United States) Dennis Ralston (United States) Pancho Segura
10 Jul	U.S. Pro Tennis Championships; Chestnut Hill, United States; Pro Slam $25000 - Grass - 16S; Singles - Doubles	(Australia) Ken Rosewall (United States) Dennis Ralston; 16-14 7-5	(France) Pierre Barthes (Spain) Andrés Gimeno	(Australia) Ken Rosewall (Australia) Fred Stolle	(Chile) Luis Ayala (United Kingdom) Mike Davies (United States) Dennis Ralston (United States) Pancho Segura
10 Jul	Antwerp Beerschot International; Beerschot Club; Antwerp, Belgium; Clay Singles - Doubles	(India) Ramanathan Krishnan; 6-2 6-2 6-3	(Australia) Roy Emerson		
10 Jul	International Swedish Hard Court Championshipss; Båstad Tennis Stadium; Båstad, Sweden; Clay; Singles - Doubles	(Australia) Martin Mulligan; 6-3 3-6 4-6 6-4 6-1	(Sweden) Jan-Erik Lundquist		
10 Jul	Dublin Invitational; Lansdowne LTC; Dublin, Ireland; Grass; Singles - Doubles	(United Kingdom) Mike Sangster; 3-6 6-3 8-6	(United Kingdom) Bobby Wilson		
10 Jul	Düsseldorf International; Rochusclub Düsseldorfer Tennisclub; Düsseldorf, West Germany; Clay; Singles - Doubles	(West Germany) Wilhelm Bungert; 6-1 2-6 6-3 6-3	(West Germany) Ingo Buding		
10 Jul	Welsh Championships; Newport Athletic Club; Newport, Wales; Grass; Singles - Doubles	(Australia) John Newcombe; 7-5 6-2	(Australia) Bill Bowrey		
10 Jul	Travemünde International; Travemünde HTC; Travemünde, West Germany; Clay; Singles - Doubles	(Romania) Ilie Năstase; 6-4 6-3 6-2	(Denmark) Jan Leschly		
10 Jul	Scottish Grass Court Championships; Craiglockhart Tennis Centre; Edinburgh, Scotland; Grass; Singles - Doubles	(Australia) Graham Primrose; 6-3 6-4	(Australia) John Cottrill		
10 Jul	Western Championships; Woodstock Country Club; Indianapolis, United States; Clay; Singles - Doubles	(Canada) Michael Belkin; 3-6 6-3 6-1 6-2	(Ecuador) Pancho Guzman		
10 Jul	Midland Counties Championships; Edgbaston Priory Club; Edgbaston, England; Grass; Singles - Doubles	(United Kingdom) Roy W. Dixon; 6-4, 4–6, 7-5	(United Kingdom) Keith Bland		
17 July	Newport Casino Pro Championships; Newport Casino; Newport, RI, United States $15000 - Grass - 10S (Round Robin); Singles - Doubles	(Australia) Rod Laver; 31-27	(Spain) Andrés Gimeno	(United States) Earl Buchholz (Australia) Ken Rosewall	Round Robin (Australia) Fred Stolle (United States) Barry MacKay (France) Pierre Barthes (Australia) Malcolm Anderson (United States) Dennis Ralston (United Kingdom) Mike Davies
17 July	Newport Casino Pro Championships; Newport Casino; Newport, RI, United States $15000 - Grass - 10S (Round Robin); Singles - Doubles	(Australia) Rod Laver (Australia) Fred Stolle; 31-27	(United States) Dennis Ralston (Australia) Ken Rosewall	(United States) Earl Buchholz (Australia) Ken Rosewall	Round Robin (Australia) Fred Stolle (United States) Barry MacKay (France) Pierre Barthes (Australia) Malcolm Anderson (United States) Dennis Ralston (United Kingdom) Mike Davies
17 July	Danish Hard Court Championships; Copenhagen, Denmark; Clay; Singles - Doubles	(Australia) Ken Fletcher; 3-6 6-4 7-5 6-4	(Sweden) Jan-Erik Lundquist		
17 July	Essex Championships; Frinton LTC; Frinton-on-Sea, England; Grass; Singles - Doubles	(United Kingdom) Bobby Wilson; 5-7 6-4 6-3	(United Kingdom) Paul Hutchins		
17 July	Swiss International Championships; Gstaad, Switzerland; Clay; Singles - Doubles	(Australia) Roy Emerson; 6-2 8-6 6-4	(Spain) Manuel Santana		
17 July	Liverpool Daily Post and Echo Hoylake Open (Note: In 1967 the newspaper company the Liverpool Daily Post and Echo Ltd took over sponsorship of the Hoylake and West Kirby Open, and it was rebranded as Liverpool Daily Post and Echo Hoylake Open, and from 1967 the tournament was also valid as North of England Championships with the winners succeeding to both titles.); Ashton Park; Hoylake, England; Grass; Singles - Doubles	(Australia) John Newcombe; 7-5 3-6 6-3	(United Kingdom) Roger Taylor		
17 July	U.S. Men's Clay Court Championships; Milwaukee, United States; Clay; Singles - Doubles	(United States) Arthur Ashe; 4-6 6-3 6-1 7-5	(United States) Marty Riessen		
17 July	U.S. Men's Clay Court Championships; Milwaukee, United States; Clay; Singles - Doubles	(United States) Clark Graebner (United States) Marty Riessen			
17 July	Czechoslovakian National Championships; Plzeň, Czechoslovakia; Clay; Singles - Doubles	(Czechoslovakia) Jan Kodeš; 9-7 6-2 6-3	(Czechoslovakia) Milan Holeček	(Czechoslovakia) Jan Kukal (Czechoslovakia) Milan Tajcnar	(Czechoslovakia) Stefan Koudelka (Czechoslovakia) Karol Safarik (Czechoslovakia) Josef Seifert (Czechoslovakia) Karol Safarik
17 July	Hungarian National Championships; Budapest , Hungary; Clay; Singles - Doubles	(Hungary) István Gulyás; Won	(Hungary) ?		
24 Jul	Binghamton Masters Pro; Binghamton, United States $17500 - Hard - 10S; Singles - Doubles	(Australia) Rod Laver; 6-1 6-3	(Spain) Andrés Gimeno		
24 Jul	Binghamton Masters Pro; Binghamton, United States $17500 - Hard - 10S; Singles - Doubles	(France) Pierre Barthes (Spain) Andrés Gimeno; 6-3 6-4	(Australia) Rod Laver (Australia) Fred Stolle		
24 Jul	Deauville Tennis Cup; Deauville TC; Deauville, France; Clay; Singles - Doubles	(Australia) John Newcombe; 11-9 7-5 6-1	(France) Pierre Darmon		
24 Jul	Colonel Kuntz Cup(U24 event); Deauville TC; Deauville, France; Clay; Singles - Doubles	(Australia) Allan Stone; 6-4 6-2	(France) Bernard Paul		
24 Jul	East of England Championships; Felixstowe, England; Grass; Singles - Doubles	(United Kingdom) Mark Cox; 6-2 6-4	(United Kingdom) Keith Wooldridge		
24 Jul	Pan American Games; Winnipeg LTC; Winnipeg, Canada; Singles - Doubles	(Brazil) Thomas Koch; 5-7 6-3 6-3 6-3	(United States) Herb S. Fitzgibbon		
24 Jul	Champions Cup (round robin event); Båstad, Sweden; Singles - Doubles	(Australia) Martin Mulligan; 7-5 6-3 6-4	(Australia) Roy Emerson		
24 Jul	Pennsylvania Lawn Tennis Championships; Merion Cricket Club; Haverford, United States; Grass; Singles - Doubles	(South Africa) Cliff Drysdale; 3-6 3-6 11-9 6-1 7-5	(United States) Clark Graebner		
24 Jul	Montana International; Montana, Switzerland; Clay; Singles - Doubles	(Australia) Ken Fletcher; 6-4 6-2	(France) François Jauffret	(United States) Stan Smith (Socialist Federal Republic of Yugoslavia) Nikola Špear	(Australia) Bob Carmichael (France) Daniel Contet (United States) Jim Osborne (Japan) Isao Kobayashi
31 Jul	Eastern Grass Court Championships; Orange Lawn Tennis Club; South Orange, United States; Grass; Singles - Doubles	(United States) Marty Riessen; 18-16 6-2 6-1	(United States) Clark Graebner		
31 Jul	All-Jamaica Championships; Sabina Park; Kingston, Jamaica; Grass; Singles - Doubles	(Jamaica) Mervyn Morris; 6-3, 6–0, 3–6, 6-4	(Jamaica) Richard Thompson	(Jamaica) Dennis Barnett (Jamaica) Lloyd Moog	
31 Jul	Bad Neuenahr International; HTC Bad Neuenahr; Bad Neuenahr-Ahrweiler, West Germany; Clay; Singles - Doubles	(Germany) Wilhelm Bungert; 2–6, 6–1, 6–4, 6–4	(Germany) Harald Elschenbroich	(United States) Brian Cheney (Japan) Keishiro Yanagi	(Spain) Juan Gisbert (Germany) Axel Geuer (Hungary) Attila Korpás (Germany) Christian Pieper
31 Jul	Trofeo Argento Città di Senigallia; Circolo Tennis Senigallia; Senigallia, Italy; Clay; Singles - Doubles	(Romania) Ion Țiriac; 4–6, 6–4, 1–6, 6–2, 6–4	(Italy) Nicola Pietrangeli		
31 Jul	Polish National Championships; Sopot, Poland; Clay; Singles - Doubles	(Poland) Wieslaw Gasiorek; 6-2 6-3 6-2	(Poland) Mieczysław Rybarczyk		
31 Jul	Polish National Championships; Sopot, Poland; Clay; Singles - Doubles	(Poland) Wieslaw Gasiorek (Poland) Józef Piątek walkover	(Poland) Bronisław Lewandowski (Poland) Tadeusz Nowicki		
31 Jul	Northumberland Championships; Jesmond Grounds; Newcastle-upon-Tyne, England; Grass; Singles - Doubles	(United Kingdom) Keith Wooldridge; 6-3 8-6	(United Kingdom) Clay Iles		
31 Jul	East German Championships; Leipzig, East Germany; Clay; Singles - Doubles	(East Germany) Ulrich Trettin; 6-3 6-1	(East Germany) Peter Fährmann		
31 Jul	East German Championships; Leipzig, East Germany; Clay; Singles - Doubles	(East Germany) Hans-Jürgen Luttropp (East Germany) Hella Riede; 4-6 7-5 6-2	(East Germany) Ulrich Trettin (East Germany) Helga Magedburg		
31 Jul	Évian-les-Bains International; Évian-les-Bains, France; Clay; Singles - Doubles	(Australia) Dick Crealy; 4–6, 6–3, 6–4	(France) Bernard Montrenaud	(Poland) Andrzej Licis (India) Ravi Venkatesan	
31 Jul	Ostend International; Ostend, Belgium; Clay; Singles - Doubles	(Japan) Koji Watanabe; 4–6, 6–3, 6–4	(South Africa) Jackie Saul	(Belgium) Patrick Hombergen (Japan) Ichizo Konishi	(Colombia) Ivan Molina (Belgium); Claude De Gronckel

=== August ===
Week	Tournament	Winner	Finalist	Semi finalist	Quarter finalist
7 Aug	Colonial Pro Championships; Fort Worth, United States $15000 - Hard - 16S; Singles - Doubles	(Australia) Rod Laver; 8-6 6-0	(United States) Dennis Ralston		
7 Aug	Colonial Pro Championships; Fort Worth, United States $15000 - Hard - 16S; Singles - Doubles	(Australia) Rod Laver (Australia) Fred Stolle; 4-6 6-2 6-2	(United States) Alex Olmedo (Ecuador) Pancho Segura		
7 Aug	British Pro Championships; Devonshire Park LTC; Eastbourne, England; Grass - 16S; Singles - Doubles	(United Kingdom) John Horn; 3-6 3-6 6-3 9-7 6-4	(United Kingdom) Charles Applewhaite		
7 Aug	British Pro Championships; Devonshire Park LTC; Eastbourne, England; Grass - 16S; Singles - Doubles	(United Kingdom) John Crooke (United Kingdom) Bill Moss; 6-1 6-4 8-6	(United Kingdom) Charles Applewhaite (United Kingdom) A.A. Stonebridge		
7 Aug	Irish Championships; Fitzwilliam LTC; Dublin, Ireland; Grass; Singles - Doubles	(United Kingdom) Keith Wooldridge; 6-3 3-6 6-0	(Republic of Ireland) Peter Mockler		
7 Aug	Ontario Centennial Open; TCSCC; Toronto, Canada; Clay; Singles - Doubles	(Brazil) Ronald Barnes; 6-0 6-2	(South Africa) Cliff Drysdale		
7 Aug	German International Championships; Am Rothenbaum; Hamburg, West Germany; Clay; Singles - Doubles	(Australia) Roy Emerson; 6-4 6-3 6-1	(Spain) Manuel Santana		
7 Aug	Belgian International Championships; Knokke-le Zoute, Belgium; Clay; Singles - Doubles	(Australia) Tony Roche; 6-1 6-2	(Australia) John Newcombe		
7 Aug	Canadian Open Championships; Monkland Tennis Club; Montreal, Canada; Clay; Singles - Doubles	(Spain) Manuel Santana; 6-1 10-8 6-4	(Australia) Roy Emerson		
7 Aug	Bavarian Championships; Munich, West Germany; Clay; Singles - Doubles	(Australia) Martin Mulligan; 6-4 3-6 6-4 6-4	(West Germany) Wilhelm Bungert		
7 Aug	Southampton Invitation; Meadow Club; Southampton, United States; Grass; Singles - Doubles	(Australia) Owen Davidson; 6-4 7-5 6-4	(Australia) Ray Ruffels		
7 Aug	Dolomite Championships; Riccione, Italy; Clay; Singles - Doubles	(Romania) Ion Țiriac; 8-6, 9–7, 8-6	(Romania) Ilie Năstase		
14 Aug	Nassau Invitation; Nassau Country Club; Glen Cove, United States; Grass; Singles - Doubles	(Australia) John Newcombe; 3-6, 6–3, 6–4, 12-10	(Australia) Tony Roche		
14 Aug	Istanbul International Championships; Istanbul, Turkey; Clay; Singles - Doubles	(Brazil) Edison Mandarino; 6-4 6-4 6-2	(Brazil) Thomaz Koch		
14 Aug	Austrian International Championships; Kitzbühel, Austria; Clay; Singles - Doubles	(Australia) Martin Mulligan; 6-2 6-2 2-6 6-4	(West Germany) Wilhelm Bungert		
14 Aug	Newport Casino Trophy; Newport Casino; Newport, United States; Grass; Singles - Doubles	(Australia) Bill Bowrey; 6-4 6-2 6-2	(Australia) Owen Davidson		
14 Aug	Brumana International; Brumana Country Club; Brummana, Lebanon; Clay; Singles - Doubles	(Australia) Dick Crealy; 6–3, 6–2, 6–4	(Ecuador) Miguel Olvera	(Czechoslovakia) Milan Holeček (Japan) Isao Watanabe	(New Zealand) Brian Fairlie (Greece) Nicholas Kalogeropoulos (Japan) Ichizo Konishi (Czechoslovakia) Jan Kukal
14 Aug	Quebec International Round Robin; Quebec City, Canada; Singles - Doubles	(Brazil) Ronald Barnes; 7-5 6-4	(Spain) Manuel Santana		
21 Aug	Wimbledon World Professional Championships; AELTC; London, England $45000 - Grass - 8S; Singles - Doubles	(Australia) Rod Laver; 6-2 6-2 12-10	(Australia) Ken Rosewall		
21 Aug	Wimbledon World Professional Championships; AELTC; London, England $45000 - Grass - 8S; Singles - Doubles	(Spain) Andrés Gimeno (United States) Pancho Gonzales; 6-4 14-12	(Australia) Rod Laver (Australia) Fred Stolle		
21 Aug	Ankara International; Ankara, Turkey; Clay; Singles - Doubles	(Brazil) Edison Mandarino; 3-6 6-2 6-3 6-2	(South Africa) Frew McMillan		
21 Aug	North of England Championships; Yorkshire LTC; Scarborough, England; Grass; Singles - Doubles	(United Kingdom) Keith Wooldridge; 3-6 6-4 6-4	(Pakistan) Haroon Rahim		
21 Aug	St Moritz International; Palace Hotel; St Moritz, Switzerland; Clay; Singles - Doubles	(Italy) Giuseppe Merlo; 6-2 6-3	(Ecuador) Eduardo Zuleta		
28 Aug	U.S. National Championships; West Side Tennis Club; Forest Hills, United States; Grand Slam; Grass; Singles - Doubles - Mix Doubles	(Australia) John Newcombe; 6-4 6-4 8-6	(United States) Clark Graebner	(United States) Eugene Scott (Denmark) Jan Leschly	(South Africa) Bob Hewitt (Australia) Owen Davidson (Brazil) Ronald Barnes (Australia) Roy Emerson
28 Aug	U.S. National Championships; West Side Tennis Club; Forest Hills, United States; Grand Slam; Grass; Singles - Doubles - Mix Doubles	(Australia) John Newcombe (Australia) Tony Roche; 6-8 9-7 6-3 6-3	(Australia) William Bowrey (Australia) Owen Davidson	(United States) Eugene Scott (Denmark) Jan Leschly	(South Africa) Bob Hewitt (Australia) Owen Davidson (Brazil) Ronald Barnes (Australia) Roy Emerson
28 Aug	U.S. National Championships; West Side Tennis Club; Forest Hills, United States; Grand Slam; Grass; Singles - Doubles - Mix Doubles	(United States) Billie Jean King (Australia) Owen Davidson; 6-3 6-2	(United States) Rosie Casals (United States) Stan Smith	(United States) Eugene Scott (Denmark) Jan Leschly	(South Africa) Bob Hewitt (Australia) Owen Davidson (Brazil) Ronald Barnes (Australia) Roy Emerson
28 Aug	Sydney Metropolitan Hard Court Championships; Naremburn, Australia; Clay; Singles - Doubles	(Australia) Rod Brent; 3-6 6-3 6-1	(Australia) Colin Dibley		
28 Aug	Budleigh Salterton Open Championships; Budleigh Salterton TC; Budleigh Salterton, England; Grass Singles - Doubles	(Pakistan) Haroon Rahim; 6-1 6-2	(United Kingdom) Keith Wooldridge		
28 Aug	World University Games; AELTC; Tokyo, Japan; Hard - 32S; Singles - Doubles	(Japan) Isao Watanabe; 6-4 6-2 6-0	(Japan) Jun Kamiwazumi	(Japan) Takeshi Koura (Japan) Hidesabro Kuromatsu	(Spain) José María Gisbert (Spain) Juan Gisbert (Italy) Giordano Maioli (Thailand) Somchai Pongonsopitsil
28 Aug	World University Games; AELTC; Tokyo, Japan; Hard - 32S; Singles - Doubles	(Spain) José María Gisbert (Spain) Juan Gisbert def.	(Italy) Stefano Gaudenzi (Italy) Giordano Maioli	(Japan) Takeshi Koura (Japan) Hidesabro Kuromatsu	(Spain) José María Gisbert (Spain) Juan Gisbert (Italy) Giordano Maioli (Thailand) Somchai Pongonsopitsil

=== September ===
Date	Tournament	Winner	Finalist	Semi finalist	Quarter finalist
4 Sep	Transvaal Pro Championships; Pretoria, South Africa $14000 - Hard - 10S; Singles - Doubles	(Australia) Fred Stolle; 6-1 6-2	(Spain) Andrés Gimeno		
4 Sep	Transvaal Pro Championships; Pretoria, South Africa $14000 - Hard - 10S; Singles - Doubles	(Australia) Rod Laver (Australia) Fred Stolle; 6-2 6-4	(South Africa) Keith Diepraam (United States) Barry MacKay		
4 Sep	Natal Pro Championships; Durban, South Africa $12500 - Hard - 10S; Singles - Doubles	(Australia) Ken Rosewall; 6-4 6-2	(Australia) Fred Stolle		
4 Sep	Natal Pro Championships; Durban, South Africa $12500 - Hard - 10S; Singles - Doubles	(Australia) Rod Laver (Australia) Fred Stolle; 6-2 7-5	(France) Pierre Barthes (Spain) Andrés Gimeno		
4 Sep	Heart of America Championships; Rockhill Tennis Club; Kansas City, United States; Hard - 36 S Singles - Doubles	(United States) Marty Riessen; 6-2 6-1 6-2	(United Kingdom) Peter William Curtis		
4 Sep	Malaysian International Championships; Bukit Kiara Sports Complex; Clay - 36S; Kuala Lumpur, Malaysia; Singles - Doubles	(Australia) Allan Stone; 6-1 6-2	(Australia) Colin Stubs		
11 Sep	Border Pro Championships; East London South Africa $12500 - Hard - 10S; Singles - Doubles	(Spain) Andrés Gimeno; 6-3	(Australia) Fred Stolle		
11 Sep	Eastern Province Pro Championships; Port Elizabeth, South Africa $15000 - Hard - 10S; Singles - Doubles	(Spain) Andrés Gimeno; 10-0	(Australia) Ken Rosewall		
11 Sep	Western Province Pro Championships; Cape Town, South Africa $15000 - Hard - 10S; Singles - Doubles	(Australia) Ken Rosewall; 6-1 3-6 6-3	(Australia) Fred Stolle		
11 Sep	Western Province Pro Championships; Cape Town, South Africa $15000 - Hard - 10S; Singles - Doubles	(Australia) Rod Laver (Australia) Fred Stolle; 8-6 6-3	(Australia) Ken Rosewall (United States) Earl Buchholz		
11 Sep	South of England Championships; Devonshire Park LTC; Eastbourne, England; Grass; Singles - Doubles	(South Africa) Frew Donald McMillan; 6-3 6-4	(United Kingdom) Mark Cox		
11 Sep	San Sebastian International; San Sebastián, Spain; Clay; Singles - Doubles	(Australia) Martin Mulligan; 4-6 2-6 6-1 6-1 6-1	(Spain) Juan Manuel Couder		
18 Sep	Johannesburg Pro Championships; Ellis Park Tennis Center; Johannesburg, South Africa $19500 - Hard - 10S; Singles - Doubles	(Australia) Rod Laver; 6-1 8-6	(Spain) Andrés Gimeno		
18 Sep	Johannesburg Pro Championships; Ellis Park Tennis Center; Johannesburg, South Africa $19500 - Hard - 10S; Singles - Doubles	(Australia) Rod Laver (Australia) Fred Stolle; 6-3 6-3	(Australia) Ken Rosewall (United Kingdom) Mike Davies		
18 Sep	Pacific Southwest Championships; Los Angeles, USA; Hard; Singles - Doubles	(Australia) Roy Emerson; 12-14 6-3 6-4	(United States) Marty Riessen		
18 Sep	Oviedo International; Oviedo, Spain; Clay; Singles - Doubles	(Australia) Martin Mulligan; 4-6 6-4 6-1 6-0	(Spain) Juan Manuel Couder		
25 Sep	Fresno Pro Championships (United States) Fresno, USA; Clay - 19S; Singles - Doubles	(United States) Dennis Ralston; 7-5 6-2	(United States) Alex Olmedo		
25 Sep	Fresno Pro Championships (United States) Fresno, USA; Clay - 19S; Singles - Doubles	(United States) Dennis Ralston (New Zealand) Ian Crookenden; 6-3 6-1	(United States) Alex Olmedo (United States) Hugh Stewart		
25 Sep	French Pro Closed Championships; Paris, France; Clay; Singles - Doubles	(France) Joseph Mateo; 4-6 6-3 6-3 6-1	(France) Mustapha Belkhodja		
25 Sep	French Pro Closed Championships; Paris, France; Clay; Singles - Doubles	(France) Olivier (France) Verdier	(France) J. Mateo (France) Geaud		
25 Sep	Real Madrid International; Madrid, Spain; Clay; Singles - Doubles	(Australia) Martin Mulligan; 7-5 6-3 2-6 12-10	(Spain) Manuel Santana		
25 Sep	ACT Championships; Canberra, Australia; Grass; Singles - Doubles	(Australia) Bruce Larkham; 6-1 6-1	(Australia) Warren Jacques		
25 Sep	Pacific Coast Championships (United States) Berkeley, USA; Hard; Singles - Doubles	(Puerto Rico) Charlie Pasarell; 7-5 8-6	(United States) Cliff Richey		

=== October ===
Week	Tournament	Winner	Finalist	Semi finalist	Quarter finalist
2 Oct	Marseille Pro Championships, (autumn edition); Marseille, France; Wood (i) - 4S; Singles - Doubles	(France) Pierre Barthes; 2-6 9-7 11-9	(Australia) Fred Stolle		
2 Oct	Marseille Pro Championships, (autumn edition); Marseille, France; Wood (i) - 4S; Singles - Doubles	(France) Pierre Barthes (Spain) Andrés Gimeno; 8-5	(United States) Barry MacKay (Australia) Fred Stolle		
2 Oct	Barcelona Pro Championships; Barcelona, Spain; Wood (i) - 4S; Singles - Doubles	(Spain) Andrés Gimeno; 6-3 6-4	(Australia) Ken Rosewall		
2 Oct	Victorian Hard Court Championships; Melbourne, Australia; Singles - Doubles	(Australia) Neale Fraser; 6-2 6-3	(Australia) Allan Stone		
2 Oct	Spanish National Championships; Murcia, Spain; Singles - Doubles	(Spain) Manuel Orantes; 6-1 6-4 6-3	(Spain) José-Luis Arilla		
9 Oct	French Pro Championships; Stade Pierre de Coubertin; Paris, France; Pro Slam; Wood (i) - 16S; Singles - Doubles	(Australia) Rod Laver; 6-4 8-6 4-6 6-2	(Spain) Andrés Gimeno		
9 Oct	French Pro Championships; Stade Pierre de Coubertin; Paris, France; Pro Slam; Wood (i) - 16S; Singles - Doubles	(France) Pierre Barthes (Spain) Andrés Gimeno; 6-3 6-4	(Australia) Fred Stolle (Australia) Rod Laver		
9 Oct	Stalybridge Covered Courts; Stalybridge Sports Stadium; Stalybridge, England; Carpet (i); Singles - Doubles	(United Kingdom) Roger Taylor; 6-3 7-5	(South Africa) Frew Donald McMillan		
9 Oct	Sydney Metropolitan Grass Court Championships; Sydney, Australia; Grass; Singles - Doubles	(Australia) Dick Crealy; 6-3 6-0	(Australia) Bill Bowrey		
16 Oct	Prague Pro Championships; Prague, Czechoslovakia; Wood (i) - 4S; Singles	(United States) Dennis Ralston; 7-5 6-1	(Australia) Rod Laver	(Australia) Fred Stolle (United States) Butch Buchholz	
16 Oct	Australian Hard Court Championships; Sydney, Australia; Clay; Singles - Doubles	(Australia) Tony Roche; 5-7 7-5 6-2 6-2	(Australia) John Newcombe		
23 Oct	London Indoor Professional Championships; Wembley Empire Pool; Wembley, London, England; Pro Slam $22500 - Wood (i) - 16S; Singles - Doubles	(Australia) Rod Laver; 2-6 6-1 1-6 8-6 6-2	(Australia) Ken Rosewall		
23 Oct	London Indoor Professional Championships; Wembley Empire Pool; Wembley, London, England; Pro Slam $22500 - Wood (i) - 16S; Singles - Doubles	(Australia) Fred Stolle (Australia) Rod Laver; 7-5 6-3 6-4	(United States) Earl Buchholz (Australia) Lew Hoad		
30 Oct	South American Championships (Note: This edition of the South American Championships was also valid as the 25th edition of the Argentina International Championships.); Buenos Aires LTC Buenos Aires, Argentina; Clay; Singles - Doubles	(United States) Cliff Richey; 7-5 6-8 6-3 6-3	(Brazil) Edison Mandarino		
30 Oct	Queensland Hard Court Championships; Ingham, Australia; Clay; Singles - Doubles	(Australia) Roy Emerson; 6-4 12-10	(Denmark) Jan Leschly		

=== November ===
Week	Tournament	Winner	Finalist	Semi finalist	Quarter finalist
6 Nov	Abidjan Pro Championships; Abidjan, Ivory Coast; Hard - 4S; Singles - Doubles	(Australia) Rod Laver; 2-6 8-6 6-3	(Spain) Andrés Gimeno		
6 Nov	Dakar Pro Championships; Dakar, Senegal; Hard - 4S; Singles - Doubles	(Spain) Andrés Gimeno; 7-5 1-6 6-3	(Australia) Rod Laver		
6 Nov	Porto Alegre International Championships; Porto Alegre, Brazil; Clay; Singles - Doubles	(United States) Cliff Richey; 6-4 3-6 6-3 8-6	(Netherlands) Tom Okker		
13 Nov	Queensland Championships; Brisbane, Australia; Grass; Singles - Doubles	(Australia) Roy Emerson; 9-7 4-6 6-4 4-6 7-5	(Australia) John Newcombe		
20 Nov	U.S.P.L.T.A. Championships; Boca Raton, United States; Clay - 30S; Singles - Doubles	(United States) Sam Giammalva; 6-2 4-6 6-3	(Australia) Warren Woodcock		
20 Nov	U.S.P.L.T.A. Championships; Boca Raton, United States; Clay - 30S; Singles - Doubles	(United States) Sam Giammalva (United States) Jason Morton; 6-4 6-3	(United States) Harry Hoffman (United States) Jim Shakespeare		
20 Nov	Belfast Pro Championships; Belfast, Northern Ireland; Wood (i)- 4S; Singles - Doubles	(Australia) Ken Rosewall; 3-6 6-2 7-5	(Australia) Lew Hoad		
20 Nov	Brazilian International Championships; Rio de Janeiro, Brazil; Clay; Singles - Doubles	(Brazil) Thomaz Koch; 6-4 11-9 3-6 6-3	(Netherlands) Tom Okker		
27 Nov	Victorian Championships; Melbourne, Australia; Grass; Singles - Doubles	(Australia) Tony Roche; 7-5 6-3 6-4	(Australia) Bill Bowrey		

=== December ===
Week	Tournament	Winner	Finalist	Semi finalist	Quarter finalist
4 Dec	Crystal Palace Trophy Indoor; London, Great Britain; Hard (i); Singles - Doubles	(South Africa) Cliff Drysdale; 6-4 6-3	(United Kingdom) Bobby Wilson		
4 Dec	New South Wales Championships; Sydney, Australia; Grass; Singles - Doubles	(Australia) Tony Roche; 8-6 6-1 8-6	(Australia) Roy Emerson	(Australia) Barry Phillips-Moore (Australia) Bill Bowrey	(Australia) John Newcombe (United Kingdom) Graham Stilwell (Australia) Ray Ruffels (Denmark) Jan Leschly
11 Dec	South Australian Championships; Adelaide, Australia; Grass; Singles - Doubles	(Australia) John Newcombe; 6-4 6-3 3-6 11-9	(Australia) Tony Roche	(Australia) Roy Emerson (Australia) Barry Phillips-Moore	(Australia) Dick Crealy (Australia) Allan Stone (Australia) Ray Ruffels (Australia) Bill Bowrey
18 Dec	Border Championships; East London, South Africa; Hard; Singles - Doubles	(Netherlands) Tom Okker; 9-7 7-5	(United Kingdom) Mark Cox		
25 Dec	Copa Faulcombridge; Club de Tenis València; Valencia, Spain; Clay; Singles - Doubles	(Chile) Ernesto Aguirre; 6-1 6-4 3-6 6-2	(Spain) Juan Gisbert Sr.		
25 Dec	Davis Cup; Milton Courts; Brisbane, Australia; Grass; 48 teams knockout Played 25/03/67 – 28/12/67	Australia	South Africa	Ecuador; India	Brazil; Japan; Soviet Union; United States
25 Dec	Davis Cup; Milton Courts; Brisbane, Australia; Grass; 48 teams knockout Played 25/03/67 – 28/12/67	Challenge Round; Spain		Ecuador; India	Brazil; Japan; Soviet Union; United States

== World Rankings ==
Amateur
Lance Tingay	Ulrich Kaiser (panel of 13 experts)	Joseph McCauley	Martini and Rossi
1. John Newcombe; 2. Roy Emerson; 3. Manuel Santana; 4. Martin Mulligan; 5. Tony Roche; 6. Bob Hewitt; 7. Nikki Pilić; 8. Clark Graebner; 9. Arthur Ashe; 10. = Jan Leschly = Wilhelm Bungert = Cliff Drysdale	1. John Newcombe; 2. Roy Emerson; 3. Manuel Santana; 4. Tony Roche; 5. Martin Mulligan; 6. Nikki Pilić; 7. Wilhelm Bungert; 8. Bob Hewitt; 9. Clark Graebner; 10. Jan Leschly	1. John Newcombe; 2. Roy Emerson; 3. Martin Mulligan; 4. Tony Roche; 5. Manuel Santana; 6. Nikki Pilić; 7. Wilhelm Bungert; 8. Clark Graebner; 9. Bob Hewitt; 10. Roger Taylor	1. John Newcombe; 2. Roy Emerson; 3. = Wilhelm Bungert = Clark Graebner; 5. Tony Roche; 6. Nikki Pilić; 7. = Eugene Scott = Jan Leschly = Roger Taylor

== Tournament winners (singles) ==
=== Pro Tennis Tour ===
This is a list of professional winners by the total number of singles titles won for 1967 major titles in bold:

- (Australia) Rod Laver – Abidjan, Berkeley, Binghamton, Boston, Fort Worth, **French Pro Championships**, Johannesburg, **London Indoor Professional Championships**, Marseille, Miami Beach, Montreal, New York City (i), Oklahoma City, Orlando, Paris, San Diego, San Juan, **U.S. Pro Tennis Championships**, Wimbledon (**19**)
- (Australia) Ken Rosewall – Belfast, Cape Town, Durban, Los Angeles, Newport Beach, St. Louis, Wembley (**7**)
- (Spain) Andrés Gimeno – Barcelona, Dakar, East London, Cincinnati, Newport Casino, Port Elizabeth (**6**)
- (Australia) Fred Stolle – Brussels, Lyon, Pretoria (**3**)
- (United States) Dennis Ralston – Fresno, Prague (**2**)
- (United States) Earl Baumgardner – Sewanee (**1**)
- (United States) Earl Buchholz – New York City (**1**)
- (United States) Pancho Gonzales – Birmingham (**1**)
- (France) Pierre Barthès – Marseille II (**1**)
- (United States) Sam Giammalva – Boca Raton (**1**)
- (United Kingdom) John Horn – Eastbourne (**1**)

=== ILTF World Circuit ===
This is a list of amateur winners by the total number of singles titles won for 1967 major titles in bold:

- (Australia) Martin Mulligan – Barcelona, Båstad, Båstad II, Capri, Catania, Helsinki, Kitzbühel, Madrid, Munich, Naples, Oviedo, Rome, Saltsjobaden, San Sebastián (**14**)
- (Australia) John Newcombe – Adelaide, Barranquilla, Deauville, Glen Cove, Houston, Hoylake, Newport, New York City (i), Queen's, San Antonio, **U.S. National Championships**, **Wimbledon Championships** (**12**)
- (Australia) Tony Roche – Dallas, Gunnedah, Knokke-le Zoute, Melbourne, Mexico City, Portola Valley, Roehampton, San Juan, Sydney II, Willemstad (**10**)
- (Australia) Roy Emerson – Brisbane, **Australian Championships**, **French Championships**, Gstaad, Hamburg, Ingham, Los Angeles, Tampa, West Berlin (**9**)
- (United States) Arthur Ashe – Brookville, Kiamesha Lake II, Milwaukee, Philadelphia, Salisbury (**5**)
- (Spain) Manuel Santana – Montreal, Murcia, Paris, Johannesburg (**4**)
- (West Germany) Wilhelm Bungert – Bad Neuenahr, Düsseldorf, Leverkusen, Munich (**4**)
- (Australia) Dick Crealy – Brumana, Évian-les-Bains, Sydney, Tel Aviv (**4**)
- (Sweden) Jan-Erik Lundquist – Bournemouth, Cairo, Madrid (**3**)
- (United States) Cliff Richey – Buenos Aires, Porto Alegre, Tulsa (**3**)
- (Australia) Owen Davidson – Beckenham, Manchester, Southampton LI (**3**)
- (United States) Marty Riessen – Atlanta, Kansas City, South Orange (**3**)
- (United Kingdom) Mark Cox – Felixstowe, Lower Hutt, Wellington (**3**)
- (Soviet Union) Alexander Metreveli – Aix-en-Provence, Moscow, Palermo (**3**)
- (Brazil) Thomas Koch – Rio de Janeiro, San Rafael, Winnipeg (**3**)
- (Ecuador) Eduardo Zuleta – Orlando, West Palm Beach (**2**)
- (East Germany) Ulrich Trettin – Leipzig, Leipzig II (**2**)
- (Puerto Rico) Charlie Pasarell – Berkeley, Salisbury (**2**)
- (United Kingdom) Gerald Battrick – Beaulieu-sur-Mer, Hampstead (**2**)
- (United States) Ron Holmberg – Charlotte, Pensacola (**2**)
- (United States) Stan Smith – Los Angeles, Sacramento (**2**)
- (Canada) Michael Belkin – Indianapolis, Montgomery (**2**)
- (Brazil) Ronald Barnes – Quebec City, Toronto (**2**)
- (Brazil) Edison Mandarino – Ankara, Istanbul (**2**)
- (United Kingdom) Roger Taylor – Stalybridge, Surbiton (**2**)
- (Italy) Giuseppe Merlo – Reggio Calabria, St. Moritz (**2**)
- (South Africa) Cliff Drysdale – Crystal Palace, Haverford (**2**)
- (United States) Eugene Scott – Great Neck, Waldwick (**2**)
- (Netherlands) Tom Okker – Bristol, East London (**2**)
- (United States) Tony Vincent – Randolph, Waldwick II (**2**)
- (France) Pierre Darmon – Paris, Moscow II (**2**)
- (United States) Jeff Borowiak – San Francisco II, San Francisco III (**2**)
- (Hungary) István Gulyás – Budapest, Tampa (**2**)
- (Australia) Ken Fletcher – Copenhagen, Montana (**2**)
- (United Kingdom) Keith Wooldridge – Newcastle-upon-Tyne, Scarborough (**2**)
- (Romania) Ilie Năstase – Cannes II, Travemünde (**2**)
- (Romania) Ion Țiriac – Riccione, Senigallia (**2**)
- (New Zealand) Onny Parun – Nelson (**1**)
- (France) Jean-Claude Barclay – Gillou (**1**)
- (United States) Bill Tully – Kiamesha Lake (**1**)
- (West Germany) Bernd Kube – Nice (**1**)
- (United States) Ed Grubb – LA Metro (**1**)
- (South Africa) Bob Hewitt – Pietermaritzburg (**1**)
- (United States) Clark Graebner – Buffalo (**1**)
- (United States) Tom Brown – San Francisco (**1**)
- (Greece) Nicholas Kalogeropoulos – City of Miami (**1**)
- (Austria) Dieter Schultheiss – Menton (**1**)
- (Australia) Anthony Hammond – Perth (**1**)
- (Australia) Ray Ruffels – Warrnambool (**1**)
- (India) Jaidip Mukerjea – Bombay (**1**)
- (Italy) Nicola Pietrangeli – Rome (**1**)
- (Chile) Jaime Pinto-Bravo – Alexandria (**1**)
- (France) Jean-Pierre Courcol – Nice (**1**)
- (Socialist Federal Republic of Yugoslavia) Niki Pilic – Caracas (**1**)
- (United States) Stan Smith – Phoenix (**1**)
- (West Germany) Bernd Weinmann – Essen (**1**)
- (United States) Jim McManus – Tiburon (**1**)
- (United Kingdom) Geoffrey Paish – Edgbaston (**1**)
- (United Kingdom) Billy Knight – Southport (**1**)
- (Australia) Ken Fletcher – Salisbury II (**1**)
- (Czechoslovakia) Jan Kodeš – Cannes (**1**)
- (Mexico) Joaquín Loyo-Mayo– San Luis Potosí (1)
- (United States) John Yeomans– Ojai (1)
- (United States) Allen Fox – St. Petersburg (**1**)
- (United Kingdom) Stanley Matthews – Sutton (**1**)
- (United States) Greg Shephard – San Jose (**1**)
- (Sweden) Birger Folke – Chingford (**1**)
- (United States) Martin Schad – Miami Beach (**1**)
- (United Kingdom) Paul Hutchins – Hurlingham (**1**)
- (Colombia) William Alvarez – Guildford (**1**)
- (Socialist Federal Republic of Yugoslavia) Boro Jovanović – Sassari (**1**)
- (Sweden) Lars Olander – Malvern (**1**)
- (India) Premjit Lall – Lytham St Annes (**1**)
- (Canada) Keith Carpenter – Cardiff (**1**)
- (India) Shyam Minotra – Barnes (**1**)
- (Czechoslovakia) Karol Safarik – Ostrava (**1**)
- (United States) Ned Weld – New Haven (**1**)
- (Australia) Terry Addison – Glasgow (**1**)
- (United States) Bob Lutz – Carbondale (**1**)
- (New Zealand) Brian Fairlie – Nottingham (**1**)
- (United States) Herb Fitzgibbon – Birmingham, (**1**)
- (Chile) Jaime Fillol – Chattanooga, (**1**)
- (United States) Peter Fishbach – Queens NY, (**1**)
- (Mexico) Joaquín Loyo-Mayo – Cincinnati (**1**)
- (India) Ramanathan Krishnan – Antwerp (**1**)
- (United Kingdom) Mike Sangster – Dublin (**1**)
- (Australia) Graham Primrose – Edinburgh (**1**)
- (Australia) John Brown – West Derby (**1**)
- (United Kingdom) Bobby Wilson – Frinton (**1**)
- (Australia) Bill Bowrey – Newport RI (**1**)
- (Australia) Rod Brent – Naremburn (**1**)
- (Czechoslovakia) Jan Kodeš – Plzen (**1**)
- (Jamaica) Mervyn Morris – Kingston (**1**)
- (Japan) Isao Watanabe – Tokyo (**1**)
- (Australia) Allan Stone –Kuala Lumpur (**1**)
- (South Africa) Frew McMillan – Eastbourne (**1**)
- (Pakistan) Haroon Rahim – Budleigh Salterton, (**1**)
- (Japan) Koji Watanabe – Ostend (**1**)
- (Poland) Wieslaw Gasiorek – Sopot (**1**)
- (France) Joseph Mateo – Paris II (**1**)
- (Australia) Bruce Larkham – Canberra (**1**)
- (Australia) Neale Fraser – Melbourne (**1**)
- (Netherlands) Tom Okker – East London (**1**)
- (Chile) Ernesto Aguirre – Valencia (**1**)

== Sources ==
- Collins, Bud (2010). The Bud Collins History of Tennis (2nd ed.). New York: New Chapter Press. ISBN 978-0942257700.
- Garcia, Gabriel. "Season: 1967". The Tennis Base. Madrid, Spain: Tennismem SAL.
- Lake, Robert J. (2019). Tennis governance from: Routledge Handbook of Tennis, History, Culture and Politics. Oxford: Routledge.
- McCauley, Joe (2003). The History of Professional Tennis. Windsor, Berkshire, England, Short Run Book Company.
- Meyers, A. Wallis (1903). Lawn Tennis at Home and Abroad. New York: Charles Scribner and Sons.
- Newspapers.com by Ancestry. Historical Newspaper Archive 1700s to 2000s Lindon, Utah, United States. via the Wikipedia Library.
- Robertson, Max (1974) The Encyclopedia of Tennis. George Allen and Unwin. London. England. ISBN 9780047960420.
