= Israel Silver Jubilee International Invitation =

Defunct tennis tournament
- Tour: ILTF World Circuit (Asia)
- Founded: 1967
- Abolished: 1967
- Location: Tel Aviv; Israel
- Venue: Maccabi Tel Aviv Tennis Club
- Category: International
- Surface: Clay / outdoor
- Draw: 16 S (men)

The Israel Silver Jubilee International Invitation was a combined mens and women's ILTF affiliated clay court tennis tournament played at Maccabi Tel Aviv Tennis Club in Tel Aviv, Israel for one edion in April 1967. The event recognized the 25th anniversary of active Jewish tennis leagues established during World War II, rather than the 1950 founding of the Israel Tennis Association.

== History ==
In April 1967, Australian player Dick Crealy claimed both the singles and doubles titles at the Israel Silver Jubilee International Invitation in Tel Aviv. Crealy secured the singles crown by defeating his compatriot Terry Addison in a best of five sets final,

While World Tennis Magazine recorded the event as a standard stop on the 1967 Men's World Tennis Circuit, the exact origin of the "Silver Jubilee" designation remains unconfirmed by official tournament records. However, sports historians contextually attribute the 25-year milestone to the anniversary of the region's first coordinated wartime tennis league frameworks established during the British Mandate era in 1942.

== Past finals ==
=== Men's singles ===
Year	Winners	Runners-up	Score
1967	(Australia) Dick Crealy	(Australia) Terry Addison	7–5, 6–4, 6–4

=== Women's singles ===
Year	Winners	Runners-up	Score
1967	(South Africa) Esme Emanuel	(Australia) Fay Toyne	9–7, 6–1
