= Carlton Club International =

Club de Carlton Internationale

Defunct tennis tournament
- Founded: 1914; 111 years ago
- Abolished: 1971; 54 years ago
- Location: Hôtel Carlton, Cannes, France
- Venue: Carlton Lawn Tennis Club
- Surface: Clay / outdoor

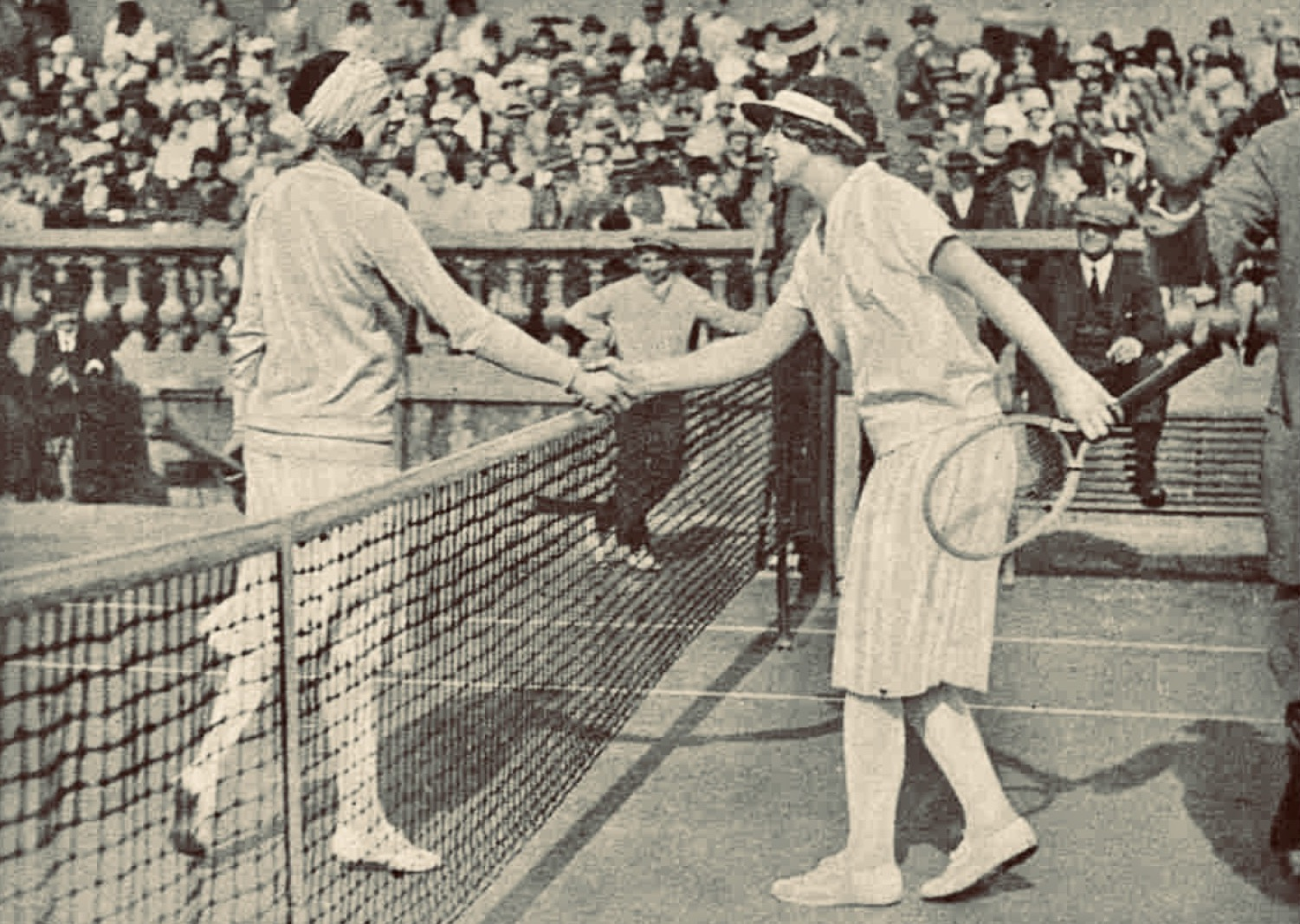

The Carlton Club International was a men's and women's international clay court tennis tournament founded in 1914 as the Carlton LTC de Cannes Championship.. Also known as the Cannes Carlton International the tournament was first played at the Carlton Lawn Tennis Club at the Hôtel Carlton, Cannes, France. The tournament ran annually until 1971.

== History ==
The Hôtel Carlton was built in 1909-11 and fully opened in 1913. The Carlton Lawn Tennis Club was adjacent to the hotel, although always associated with the Carlton Hotel, the tennis club became privately owned by the Irish tennis playing Burke family. In 1914 the club established the Carlton LTC de Cannes Championship.

The event was not staged during World War I or World War II. The 1971 edition had to be cancelled due to heavy snow and was not continued. In 1972 the owners of the tennis club made the decision to sell off the 4,000 square metres occupied by the courts and construct on the site a residential building. Sadly, no tennis courts now exist at the Carlton Hotel, Cannes.

== Event Names ==
- Carlton L.T.C. de Cannes Championship (1914–1929)
- Carlton Club Championship (1930–1942)
- Carlton Club International (1953–1971)
