= Deauville Tennis Cup =

Coupe de Tennis de Deauville

Defunct tennis tournament
- Founded: 1912; 113 years ago
- Abolished: 1973; 52 years ago
- Location: Deauville, France
- Venue: Sporting-Club de Deauville
- Surface: Clay / outdoor
- Prize money: .

The Deauville Tennis Cup was a men's and women's open international clay court tennis tournament founded in 1912 as the International Tennis Championship of Deauville. Also known as the Deauville International it was first played at the Sporting-Club de Deauville, Deauville, France the tournament ran until 1973.

== History ==
Tennis was first played by the British in front of the Grand Hôtel, Deauville in 1894. In 1912 the International Tennis Championship of Deauville was established, and the first men's singles champion was Anthony Wilding. The event was later known as the Coupe de Deauville or Deauville International, just after World War II the tournament ran annually with breaks until 1973 when it was discontinued.
