= Bay Counties Championships =

Defunct tennis tournament
- Tour: USNLTA Circuit (1902–1919); USLTA Circuit (1920–23); ILTF World Circuit (1924–69) men (1924–70) women ILTF Independent Circuit (1970–74) men (1973–74) women
- Founded: 1902; 123 years ago
- Abolished: 1974; 51 years ago
- Location: San Francisco; San Rafael; Tiburon
- Venue: Golden Gate Park Tennis Courts; Rafael Racquet Club; Tiburon Peninsula Club
- Surface: Clay / outdoor

The Bay Counties Championships was a men's and women's clay court tennis tournament was founded in 1902 as a women's event called the Bay Counties Ladies Tennis Tournament. In 1904 it became a combined event called the Championship of the Bay Counties. The tournament was first played at Golden Gate Park, San Francisco, United States. It played annually through till 1974 when it was discontinued.

== History ==
The tournament was first established in 1902 as the Bay Counties Ladies Tennis Tournament and was played at Golden Gate Park, San Francisco, United States. In 1904 it became a fully fledged combined me's and women's called the Championship of the Bay Counties. It continued to be played at the Golden Gate Park courts in San francisco until 1962. In 1963 it moved to the Rafael Racquet Club in san San Rafael until 1964. It moved back to San Francisco for one final edition in 1966. In 1967 it changed venue to the Tiburon Peninsula Club in Tiburon, California until 1974 where it sometimes carried the denomination of Bay Counties Invitational Championships, when it ceased to be an individual competition as part of the ILTF Independent Circuit.
