= Lyon Pro Championships =

Defunct tennis tournament
- Founded: 1933
- Abolished: 1967
- Editions: 4
- Location: Lyon; France
- Venue: Tennis Club de Lyon
- Surface: Clay / outdoor (1933-34); Wood / indoor (1953, 68)

The Lyon Pro Championships was a men's professional tennis tournament founded in 1933. Also known as the Lyon Professional Championships It was played in Lyon, France intermittently until 1967.

== History ==
The event was first played in 1933 at the Tennis Club de Lyon (founded in 1894).

The club originally had two indoor wood courts were inaugurated six years earlier, in 1899. A third court was added in 1909, and eight outdoor clay courts.

In 1901, Henri Cochet's parents took over the club, and the same year he was born there.

The first two editions were played in September and early October were played on clay courts, the final two editions played in November, on indoor wood courts.

== Finals ==
=== Singles ===
Include:

Year	Champion	Runners-up	Score
1933	(France) Henri Cochet	(France) Martin Plaa	6–8, 9–7, 6–4
1934	(United States) Bill Tilden	(France) Henri Cochet	3–6, 6–2, 7–5, 6–4
1953	(Ecuador) Pancho Segura	(Australia) Frank Sedgman	3–6, 6–4, 6–3
1967	(Australia) Fred Stolle	(Australia) Rod Laver	6–1, 3–6, 6–4
