= Budleigh Salterton Open Championships =

Defunct tennis tournament
- Tour: ILTF World Circuit
- Founded: 1885; 141 years ago
- Abolished: 1973; 53 years ago
- Location: Budleigh Salterton, Devon, England
- Venue: Budleigh Salterton LTC
- Surface: Grass

The Budleigh Salterton Open Championships was a combined grass court tennis tournament founded in 1885 as a mens event the Budleigh Salterton Tournament. In 1890 a women's event was added to the schedule. Also known as the Budleigh Salterton Open it was played in Budleigh Salterton, Devon, England until 1973.
