= City of Perth Championships =

Defunct tennis tournament
- Tour: ILTF World Circuit (1922–72); ILTF Independent Circuit (1973–83)
- Founded: 1922; 104 years ago
- Abolished: 1983; 43 years ago
- Location: Perth, Western Australia, Australia
- Venue: Royal King's Park Tennis Club
- Surface: Asphalt/grass (outdoors)

The City of Perth Championships was a men's and women's tennis tournament founded in 1922, replacing the earlier tournament the Perth Metropolitan Championships (1905–1921), which was a men's only event. It was organised by the Royal King's Park Tennis Club, Perth, Western Australia, and played on asphalt (later hard courts) and grass courts. It ran until 1983 as part of the ILTF Independent Circuit.

== History ==
In 1899 the Royal King's Park Tennis Club was founded as the Mount Tennis Club. In 1905 the club founded the Perth Metropolitan Championships, and the same year the club changed its name from Mount Tennis Club to King's Park Tennis Club.

In 1906 it conducted the first Perth Men's Metropolitan Singles Championship, which was won by Ernie Parker. In 1907 a men's doubles championships was established. This tournament did not have any women's events. King's Park Tennis Club continued to hold the Metropolitan Championships until 1921, after which point it was replaced by a new event, the City of Perth Championships, in 1922.

The tournament was part of ILTF Australasia Circuit, a regional sub tennis circuit of the ILTF World Circuit until 1972, when it became part of the ILTF Independent Circuit (tournaments not part of the ILTF Grand Prix Circuit or WTA Tour until 1983, when it was discontinued.

== Sources ==
- Garcia, Gabriel. (2023) City of Perth Championships. The Tennis Base. Madrid, Spain: Tennismem SL.
- Cox, Graeme and Lindsay (6 September 2002). The McGibbon Years (A History of the first Fifty Years of the Royal King's Park Tennis Club). Perth, WA: Royal Kings Park Tennis Club.
- https://www.rkptc.com.au/heritage/learn more about the McGibbon Years.pdf file.
