= Boston Garden Pro Championships =

Defunct tennis tournament
- Tour: Pro Tennis Tour
- Founded: 1967; 58 years ago
- Abolished: 1967; 58 years ago
- Location: Boston, United States
- Venue: Boston Garden
- Surface: Hard / indoor
- Draw: 8
- Prize money: $18,000

The Boston Garden Pro Championships was a men's professional tennis hard court tennis tournament played for one edition in 1967. It was played at the Boston Garden, Boston, United States when it was discontinued.

== History ==
The Boston Garden Pro Championships was established in March 1967, also called the New England Professional Championships for that year only, (Note: In 1935 a New England Pro Championships was held at the Longwood Cricket Club, Chestnut Hill, Brookline and was played on grass courts, the tournament was not held again until 1946 at the same venue and played on the same surface, almost 20 years later the Boston Garden Pro also carried the joint denomination of New England Professional Championships) it was played on indoor uniturf tennis courts at the Boston Garden for one edition only. The tournament part of the Pro Tennis Tour and was a $18,000 event, or approximately $164,210 (2024) inflation adjusted. The tournament consisted of an eight players and was played between 27 March and 29 March 1967.

== Finals ==
=== Singles ===
Year	Champion	Runner-up	Score
1967	(Australia) Rod Laver	(Australia) Ken Rosewall	6–4, 6–0.
