= Golden Gate Park Classic =

Defunct tennis tournament
- Tour: ILTF World Circuit
- Founded: 1902; 124 years ago
- Abolished: 1972; 54 years ago
- Location: San Francisco, United States
- Venue: Golden Gate Tennis Club
- Surface: Hard/ outdoors

The Golden Gate Park Classic was a USLTA/ILTF combined men's and women's affiliated hard court tennis tournament founded in 1902 as the Golden Gate Park Tournament. Also known as the Golden Gate Classic or Golden Gate Class Tournament the event was played annually at the Gold Gate Tennis Club, Golden Gate Park, San Francisco, California, United States from inception, and ran annually until 1973.
