= Pierre Gillou International =

Pierre Gillou international

Defunct tennis tournament
- Tour: ILTF World Circuit
- Founded: 1948; 77 years ago
- Abolished: 1968; 57 years ago
- Editions: 21
- Location: Paris, France
- Surface: Wood / indoors

The Pierre Gillou International or the Pierre Gillou International Indoor was a combined men's and women's FFT/ILTF affiliated indoor wood court tennis tournament founded in 1948. Also known as the Pierre Gillou Cup Indoor, it was first played at the Racing Club de France, in Paris, France. The tournament was usually played either in January or February and ran annually until 1968 when it last held at the Pierre de Coubertin Stadium then was discontinued.

== History ==
The tournament was first organised by the French Tennis Federation and named after its then sitting president Pierre Gillou. Following his death in January 1953, and until 1978 the trophy awarded to the winner of the men's singles at the French Open was called the "Coupe Pierre-Gillou". In 1978 that trophy was renamed "Coupe des Mousquetaires".
