= Rhodesian Open Tennis Championships =

Defunct tennis tournament
- Founded: 1897; 128 years ago
- Abolished: 1979; 46 years ago
- Location: Salisbury, Southern Rhodesia/Rhodesia
- Surface: Grass

The Rhodesian Open Tennis Championships was an open men's and women's international tennis tournament founded in 1897 as the Rhodesian Lawn Tennis Championships. In 1949 the tournament name changed to the Rhodesian International Championships until 1972. The tournament ran until 1979 when it was discontinued.

== History ==
The Rhodesian Lawn Tennis Association held its first annual championships in 1897. At that time it was affiliated to the South African Lawn Tennis Union until 1932 when it became affiliated to the British Lawn Tennis Association. In 1949 the tournament name changed to the Rhodesian International Championships until 1972. In 1972 the tournament was renamed as the Rhodesian Open Tennis Championships. In 1980 the tournament was abolished following independence from the United Kingdom, and later formation of the new state of Zimbabwe
