= New York Pro Championships (tennis) =

Defunct tennis tournament
- Tour: Pro Tennis Tour
- Founded: 1965; 60 years ago
- Abolished: 1967; 58 years ago
- Location: New York City, United States
- Venue: 71st Regiment Armory, 34th St
- Surface: Wood / indoor

The New York Pro Championships also known as the New York Professional Championships was a men's professional wood court indoor tennis tournament founded in 1965. It was first played 71st Regiment Armory, 34th St, New York City, United States until 1967 when it was discontinued.

== History ==
The New York Pro Championships was a men's tennis tournament established in 1965. It was first played on indoor wood courts at the 71st Regiment Armory, 34th St, New York City, United States. In 1967 the second and final edition was also played at the 71st Regiment Armory in New York City. when it was discontinued.

== Finals ==
=== Men's singles ===
(Incomplete roll)

Year	Location	Champions	Runners-up	Score
1965	New York City	(Australia) Rod Laver	(United States) Pancho Gonzales	6–3, 6–1.
1967	New York City	(Australia) Rod Laver (2)	(United States) Pancho Gonzales	7–5, 14–16, 7–5, 6–2.
