= Canadian Professional Championships =

Tennis tournament in Canada (1939–1967)

Defunct tennis tournament
- Tour: Pro Tennis Tour
- Founded: 1939; 87 years ago
- Abolished: 1967; 59 years ago
- Editions: 8
- Location: Montreal; Quebec City
- Venue: Civil Employees Tennis Club; Montreal Forum
- Surface: Clay / outdoor Wood / indoor
- Prize money: S8,000

The Canadian Professional Championships was a men's professional tennis hard court tennis tournament first played in Montreal, Canada, in 1939. Also known as the Canadian Pro Championships It was held in various locations in Canada until 1967 when it was discontinued.

== History ==
The Canadian Professional Championships were first played at the Montreal Forum, Montreal, Canada, as part of the North America Pro tour between January and May 1939 then was discontinued. In September 1950 the event was revived and played on clay court at the Civil Employees Tennis Club in Quebec City, Canada. The tournament was part of the Pro Tennis Tour and the second version of the tournament ran till 1954 then was discontinued. In March 1967 the tournament was revived for a third time, with it also being the final one off edition it was again played on indoor wood courts at the Montreal Forum, Montreal, Canada and then was discontinued.

== Finals ==
=== Singles ===
(Incomplete roll)

Year	Location	Champions	Runners-up	Score
1939 (Note: Two editions of the Championships were held in 1939 as part of the North America Pro Tour the first in April and the second was played in May, Don Budge won both events.)	Montreal	(United States) Don Budge	(United States) Ellsworth Vines	6-2, 6–2, 6–3
1939	Montreal	(United States) Don Budge (2)	(United Kingdom) Fred Perry	6-2 6-2 6–1
1950	Quebec City	(United States) Frank Kovacs	(United States) Welby Van Horn	7-5 6-3 6-8 9–7.
1951	Quebec City	(Ecuador) Pancho Segura	(United States) Frank Kovacs	6-3 10-12 6-3 6–3.
1952	Quebec City	(Ecuador) Pancho Segura (2)	(United States) Don Budge	6-2 2-6 6-2 6–0.
1953	Quebec City	(United States) Pancho Gonzales	(United States) Robert (Junior) Stubbs	1-6 6-0 6-3 6–0.
1954	Quebec City	(United States) Bobby Riggs	(United States) Bobby Riggs	6-0 6-4 6–4.
1967	Montreal	(Australia) Rod Laver	(United States) Dennis Ralston	6–3, 6–3.
