= Western Indoor Open =

Defunct tennis tournament
- Tour: ILTF World Circuit
- Founded: 1920; 106 years ago
- Abolished: 1974; 52 years ago
- Location: Chicago; Cleveland; Detroit; Richmond; Streetsboro
- Venue: Various
- Surface: Wood / Carpet / indoors

The Western Indoor Open was a combined men's and women's USLTA/ILTF affiliated indoor tennis tournament founded in 1920 as the Western Indoor Championships. The tournament was first played at the Chicago, Illinois, United States and was organised by the Western Tennis Association (today called USTA Western). It continued to played annually in various locations, when it was last played in Cleveland, Ohio, United States in 1974 when it was discontinued.

== See also ==
- Western Championships (outdoor event)
