= La Rasante International =

Defunct tennis tournament
- Tour: ILTF World Circuit
- Founded: 1956
- Abolished: 1967
- Editions: 4
- Location: Brussels; Belgium
- Venue: Royal La Rasante Club
- Category: International
- Surface: Clay / outdoor

The La Rasante International was a combined RBTF/ILTF affiliated clay court tennis tournament. Also known as the La Rasante Open Invitation it was first played at the Royal La Rasante Club, in Brussels, Belgium in 1956, and last played at the same venue in 1967 when it was discontinued.

In 1982 the club launched a new successor tournament called the Critérium de La Rasante as part of the Belgian National Circuit that ended in 1985.

== Past finals ==
=== Men's singles ===
(incomplete roll)

Year	Winners	Runners-up	Score
1956	(Belgium) André Jamar	(Belgium) Raymond Evalenko	6–2, 6–1, 3–6, 6–3
1967	(Australia) Roy Emerson	(Netherlands) Tom Okker	6–3, 3–6, 7–5, 6–4

=== Women's singles ===
(incomplete roll)

Year	Winners	Runners-up	Score
1963	(United Kingdom) Alison Stroud	(United Kingdom) Joyce Barclay	3–6, 6–3, 6–2
1965	(United States) Julie Heldman	(Australia) Gail Sherriff	9–7, 6–1

=== Mixed doubles ===
(incomplete roll)

Year	Winners	Runner-up	Score
1963	(United Kingdom) Gerald Battrick (United Kingdom) Joyce Barclay	(Belgium) Claude de Gronckel (Belgium) Monique Bédoret	won?
