= BBC2 Pro Championships =

Defunct tennis tournament
- Tour: Pro Tennis Tour
- Founded: 1967; 59 years ago
- Abolished: 1967; 59 years ago
- Location: Wembley, England
- Venue: Wembley Empire Pool
- Surface: Wood / indoor
- Draw: 4
- Prize money: $14,000

The BBC2 Pro Championships was a men's professional indoor wood court tennis tournament played for one edition in 1967. It was played at the Wembley Empire Pool, Wembley, London, England when it was discontinued.

== History ==
The BBC2 Pro Championships was it was played on indoor wood tennis courts at the Wembley Empire Pool, London, England for one edition only. The tournament part of the Pro Tennis Tour and was a $14,000 event, or approximately $127,719 (2024) inflation adjusted. The tournament consisted of a four players and was played between 3rd and 5th April 1967. The event coincided with the British public television broadcaster BBC2 who began transmitting in colour for the first time, and this tournament. It preceded the colour broadcasting of the later Wimbledon Pro tournament in August that year.

== Finals ==
=== Singles ===
Year	Champion	Runner-up	Score
1967	(Australia) Ken Rosewall	(United States) Dennis Ralston	6–4, 6–2.
