= Barcelona Pro Championships =

Defunct tennis tournament
- Tour: Pro Tennis Tour (1953-1968); ILTF World Open Circuit (1969)
- Founded: 1966
- Abolished: 1969
- Editions: 3
- Location: Barcelona, Catalonia; Spain
- Venue: Real Club de Tenis Barcelona (1966,69); Palacio Municipal de Deportes de Barcelona (1967)
- Surface: Clay / outdoor (1966, 69); Wood / indoor (1967)

The Barcelona Pro Championships was a men's tennis tournament founded in 1966. Also known as the Barcelona Pro it was first played on outdoor clay courts at the Real Club de Tenis Barcelona, then on indoor wood courts at the Palacio Municipal de Deportes de Barcelona before moving back to clay, in Barcelona, Spain. The event ran annually until 1969 when it was discontinued.

== Past finals ==
=== Men's singles ===
Year	Winners	Runners-up	Score
1966	(Spain) Andrés Gimeno	(Australia) Rod Laver	6–4, 10–8, 3–6, 4–6, 6–2
1967	(Spain) Andrés Gimeno (2)	(Australia) Ken Rosewall	6–3, 6–4
1969	(Spain) Andrés Gimeno (3)	(Australia) Rod Laver	10–8, 2–6, 3–6, 6–4, 6–1

==== 3rd & 4th Place (1967) ====
Year	Winners	Runners-up	Score
1967	(Australia) Fred Stolle	(France) Pierre Barthes	6–4, 6–4
