= Wellington Open Championships =

Defunct tennis tournament
- Tour: ILTF World Circuit
- Founded: 1900; 126 years ago
- Abolished: 1972; 54 years ago
- Location: Wellington, New Zealand
- Surface: Grass / outdoors

The Wellington Open Championships was a combined men's and women's grass court tennis tournament founded in 1900.

The tournament was originally known as the Championships of Wellington in its earlier years. Prior to beginning of the open era it was called simply the Wellington Championships. The event was played annually with breaks until 1972, when it was discontinued and ceased to be part of the ILTF World Circuit.

A successor event to this one is still held today as the Wellington Open, an ITF Futures event as part of the ITF World Tour.
