= Brussels Pro Championships =

Defunct tennis tournament
- Tour: Pro Tennis Tour
- Founded: 1934; 92 years ago
- Abolished: 1967; 59 years ago
- Location: Brussels, Belgium
- Surface: Clay / outdoors Wood / indoors

The Brussels Pro Championships was an outdoor clay court then later indoor wood court professional tennis tournament founded in 1934. It was staged in Brussels in Belgium, and also known as the Brussels Professional Championships it featured three tournaments, a spring event usually held in April, an Autumn event played in October, and sometimes early Winter edition in December. The tournament was not held permanently and was last played in April 1967 when it was discontinued.

== Finals ==
Note events sometimes referred to as the Brussels Professional Spring or Autumn Championships.

=== Singles (Spring) ===
Round robin and elimination events played in April.

| Year | Champions | Runners-up | Score |
|---|---|---|---|
| 1938 | (Nazi Germany) Hans Nusslein (1st) | (United States) Bill Tilden (2nd) | 3-0 matches |
| 1939 | (United States) Ellsworth Vines | (United States) Don Budge | RR 3-1 matches |
| 1960 | (Australia) Ken Rosewall | (Peru) Alex Olmedo | 7-5, 6–2 |
| 1967 | (Australia) Fred Stolle | (United States) Dennis Ralston | 6-3, 6–4 |

=== Singles (Autumn) ===
Round robin and elimination event played in October.

| Year | Champion | Runners-up | Score |
|---|---|---|---|
| 1938 | (Nazi Germany) Hans Nusslein (1st) | (United States) Bill Tilden (2nd) | 3-0 matches |
| 1959 | (United States) Tony Trabert | (Australia) Ken Rosewall | 6-8, 9–7, 6–4 |

=== Singles (Winter) ===
Elimination event played in December

| Year | Champion | Runners-up | Score |
|---|---|---|---|
| 1938 | (United States) Ellsworth Vines | (United States) Bill Tilden | 6-4, 6–8, 7–5, 1–6, 6–3 |
