= Birmingham Professional Tennis Classic =

Defunct tennis tournament
- Event name: Birmingham Pro Classic
- Tour: Pro Tennis Tour
- Founded: 1966; 60 years ago
- Abolished: 1967; 59 years ago
- Editions: 2
- Location: Birmingham, Alabama, United States
- Venue: Highland Racquet Club
- Surface: Clay / outdoor

The Birmingham Professional Tennis Classic was a men's USPLTA affiliated clay court tennis tournament founded in 1966. Also known as the Birmingham Pro Classic, it was played in Birmingham, Alabama, United States until 1967.

== Finals ==
=== Singles ===
Year	Winners	Runners-up	Score
1966	(United States) Pancho Gonzales	(United States) Crawford Henry	6-2, 7-5
1967	(United States) Pancho Gonzales	(United Kingdom) Alan Mills	6-4, 6-2
