= Connecticut State Championships =

Defunct tennis tournament
- Tour: ILTF World Circuit (1929–69) men (1929–72) women ILTF Independent Circuit (1970–72) men
- Founded: 1895; 130 years ago
- Abolished: 1970; 55 years ago
- Location: Hartford; Litchfield; New Canaan; New Haven; Norfolk
- Venue: Various
- Surface: Grass / outdoor

The Connecticut State Championships was a men's and women's tennis tournament was founded in 1895. The tournament was first played in Hartford, United States. It was played annually at various locations through till 1970 when it was discontinued.

== History ==
The championships were first held in June 1895 at the Hartford Lawn Tennis Club, Hartford, Connecticut, United States, and the event was sanctioned by the United States National Lawn Tennis Association. The tournament has been held in Hartford, Litchfield, New Canaan and New Haven. From the early 1920s the men's championships and women's championships were hosted in different locations. The championships continued until 1970, as part of the ILTF World Circuit when it was downgraded from the main tour.
