= Los Angeles Pro Championships =

Defunct tennis tournament
- Tour: Pro Tennis Tour; NTL Pro Tour
- Founded: 1967; 59 years ago
- Abolished: 1969; 57 years ago
- Location: Inglewood; Los Angeles
- Venue: LA Forum; Los Angeles Tennis Club
- Surface: Hard / outdoor Carpet / indoor
- Prize money: $20,000 (combined)

The Los Angeles Pro Championships was a men's and women's professional tennis tournament first held in 1967. Also known as the NTL Los Angeles Pro Championships it was first played on outdoor hard courts at the Los Angeles Tennis Club, Los Angeles, United States. The tournament ran annually until 1969.

== History ==
The Los Angeles Pro Championships was a men's and women's hard then later carpet court professional tennis tournament founded in 1967. It was played at the Los Angeles Tennis Club for the first edition, then the LA Forum for the final two editions. In 1968 the event became part of the National Tennis League and for that tour was branded as the NTL Los Angeles Pro Championships. In 1969 the event was rebranded as the Los Angeles Invitational Pro Championships, and offered a combined prize fund of $20,000 that year. The final edition of this tournament was held at the LA Forum, Inglewood, California and was played on indoor carpet courts.

== Finals ==
=== Men's singles ===
Year	Champions	Runners-up	Score
1967	(Australia) Ken Rosewall	(Australia) Rod Laver	6–2, 2–6, 7–5.
1968	(United States) Pancho Gonzales	(Australia) Rod Laver	1–6, 6–3, 6–4.
1969	(Australia) Rod Laver	(United States) Marty Riessen	6–4, 10–8.

=== Women's singles ===
Year	Champions	Runners-up	Score
1968	(United States) Billie Jean King	(United Kingdom) Ann Haydon Jones	12–10, 6–3
1969	(United States) Billie Jean King (2)	(United Kingdom) Ann Haydon Jones	17–15, 6–3

== Event names ==
- Los Angeles Pro Championships (1967)
- NTL Los Angeles Pro Championships (1968)
- Los Angeles Invitational Pro Championships (1969)
