= 1967 South American Championships =

- Date: 30 October to 5 November
- Edition: 25th
- Category: ILTF South American Circuit
- Draw: 32
- Surface: Clay / Outdoor
- Location: Buenos Aires, Argentina
- Venue: Buenos Aires Lawn Tennis Club
- South American Championships (tennis)

The 1967 South American Championships was a combined men's and women's tennis tournament played on outdoor clay courts at the Buenos Aires Lawn Tennis Club in Buenos Aires in Argentina. It was the twenty fifth edition of the tournament before the open era began, and was held from 30 October through 5 November 1967. Cliff Richey and Billie Jean King won the singles titles.

== Finals ==
=== Men's singles ===
(United States) Cliff Richey defeated (Brazil) José Edison Mandarino 7–5, 6–8, 6–3, 6–3

=== Women's singles ===
(United States) Billie Jean King defeated (United States) Rosemary Casals 6–3, 3–6, 6–2

=== Women's doubles ===
(France) Francoise Durr / (Argentina) Norma Baylon defeated (United States) Rosemary Casals / (United States) Billie Jean King 6–8, 6–4, 6–3

=== Mixed doubles ===
(United Kingdom) Roger Taylor / (France) Francoise Durr .
