= Leverkusen International =

Defunct tennis tournament
- Tour: ILTF World Open Circuit
- Founded: 1947
- Abolished: 1977
- Location: Leverkusen; West Germany
- Venue: Sportanlage am Stadtpark; RTHC Bayer Leverkusen (organisers)
- Category: International
- Surface: Clay / outdoor

The Leverkusen International was a DTB/ILTF affiliated clay court tennis tournament founded in 1947. It was the successor tournament to earlier Wiesdorf District Championships. It was organised by RTHC Bayer Leverkusen and played at the SpoCity rtanlage am Stadtpark, Leverkusen, West Germany until 1977.

== History ==
In 1926 the Wiesdorf District Championships was establiahed. It was first played at the Wiesdorfer Tennisclub, in Wiesdorf, Germany this was a closed competition for the players from the Rhineprovince for two editions only then stopped.

In 1947 it was revived as an open international tennis event, and played at the Sportanlage am Stadtpark, the event was organised by the Tennis-Club Leverkusen (founded 1913) from 1948 until 1951.

In 1951 that club merged with local rowing and hockey clubs to form the RTHC Bayer Leverkusen (Ruder-, Tennis- und Hockey-Club) who then organized the event. The tournament ran annually until 1977 when it was discontinued.
