= Planters Pro Challenge Cup =

Defunct tennis tournament
- Tour: Pro Tennis Tour
- Founded: 1967; 58 years ago
- Abolished: 1967; 58 years ago
- Location: Miami Beach, Florida, United States
- Venue: Flamingo Park Tennis Center
- Surface: Hard / outdoor
- Draw: 8
- Prize money: S15,000

The Planters Pro Challenge Cup was a men's professional tennis hard court tennis tournament played for one edition in 1967. It was played at Flamingo Park Tennis Center, Miami Beach, Florida, United States when it was discontinued.

== History ==
The Planters Pro Challenge Cup were first in March 1967 and played on outdoor hard courts for one edition only. The tournament part of the Pro Tennis Tour and was a US$15,000 event, or approximately $136,842 (2024) inflation adjusted. The tournament consisted of an eight players and was played between 13 March and 27 March 1967.

== Finals ==
=== Singles ===
1st & 2nd Place Final
Year	Winner	2nd	Score
1967	(Australia) Rod Laver	(Spain) Andrés Gimeno	6–3, 6–3.

3rd & 4th Place Final
Year	3rd	4th	Score
1967	(United States) Dennis Ralston	(Australia) Fred Stolle	8–5.

=== Doubles ===
Year	Winners	Runners-up	Score
1967	(Australia) Rod Laver (Australia) Fred Stolle	(United States) Pancho Gonzales (United States) Dennis Ralston	6–4, 3–6, 6–4.
