= Concord International Indoor =

Defunct tennis tournament
- Tour: ILTF World Circuit
- Founded: 1967; 58 years ago
- Abolished: 1968; 57 years ago
- Editions: 2
- Location: Kiamesha Lake, New York, United States
- Venue: Concord Resort Hotel
- Surface: Hard / Carpet / indoors

The Concord International Indoor was a men's ILTF affiliated indoor tennis tournament founded in 1967. Also known as the Concord Indoor Invitational, it was played at the Concord Resort Hotel, Kiamesha Lake, New York, United States until 1968 when it was discontinued.

The facilities at this venue included four indoor tennis courts, and up to six in total.

== Finals ==
=== Singles ===
Year	Winners	Runners-up	Score
1967	(United States) Arthur Ashe	(Brazil) Thomas Koch	6–3, 2–6, 6–2.
1968	(United States) Arthur Ashe	(Denmark) Jan Leschly	6–3, 15–13
