= Pacific Coast Invitational =

Defunct tennis tournament
- Tour: ILTF World Circuit
- Founded: 1967; 58 years ago
- Abolished: 1986; 39 years ago
- Location: San Rafael, California Portland, Oregon
- Surface: Carpet / Hard / indoors

The Pacific Coast Invitational was a USTA/ITF affiliated indoor tennis tournament also known as the Louisiana Pacific Invitational for sponsorship reasons, it was originally founded as the Pacific Coast Indoor International in 1967 when it was played in San Rafael, California. In 1971 the event was revived in Portland, Oregon in the United States as the Pacific Coast Indoor Championships when it replaced the earlier Oregon State Indoor Invitation tournament. In 1978 it was renamed under its last title name, and ran annually until 1985 when it was moved to the Chiles Center, Portland, it ran for one more edition in 1986, then was abolished.

== History ==
In January 1967 the Pacific Coast Indoor International was founded in San Rafael, California, also co branded as the Pacific Coast Indoor Championships that first tournament was won by Brazil's Thomaz Koch. This first version of the event was a sanctioned Southern California Tennis Association tournament, who also administered the Pacific Coast Championships the outdoor event.

In February 1966 the Oregon State Indoor Invitation event was founded in Eugene, Oregon. The same year the Irvington Club in Portland had built new indoor tennis courts as part of its expansion. In 1967 the state indoor invitation event was moved to Irvington Club in Portland.

In 1970 Oregon State Indoor Invitation was ended, and replaced under a new name as the Pacific Coast Indoor Championships in 1971, that year Jimmy Connors played at the tournament.

In 1977 Tracey Austin played at the event. In 1978, the Pacific Coast Indoor as it was then known was rebranded as to the Pacific Coast Invitational or (Louisiana Pacific Coast Invitational) for sponsorship reasons.

The event alternated location between the Irvington Club, and the Eastmoreland Racquet Club in Portland.

In 1985, its final edition, the event was moved to the Chiles Center at the University of Portland, until 1986 then was discontinued.

== Event names ==
Official

- Pacific Coast Indoor International/Pacific Coast Indoor Championships. (1967)
- Pacific Coast Indoor Championships (1971–77)
- Pacific Coast Invitational (1978–86)

== See also ==
- Pacific Coast Championships (outdoor event)
