= All-Jamaica Tennis Championships =

Defunct tennis tournament
- Tour: ILTF Circuit (1913-1968)
- Founded: 1904; 121 years ago
- Abolished: 1968; 57 years ago
- Location: Kingston, Jamaica .
- Venue: various

The All-Jamaica Tennis Championships or simply the Jamaica Championships was a combined men's and women's tennis tournament founded in 1904 as the All-Jamaica Tournament. The tournament was organised by the Jamaica Lawn Tennis Association (now called the Droitwich Tennis Club), and played in Kingston, Jamaica The tournament ran until 1968 when it ceased to be part of the ILTF Circuit.

== History ==
In 1904 the All Jamaica Tennis Tournament was inaugurated. From 1915 to 1916 there no open women's singles event held. Between 1942 and 1944 the tournament was not held due to World War II. The championships were mainly won by players from Jamaica at least up until the 1950s when more international players participated in the event. In 1968 the tournament ceased to be part of the senior worldwide tennis circuit. The All-Jamaican Lawn Tennis Championships however are still being held in modern era.
