= Marseille Pro Championships =

Defunct tennis tournament
- Founded: 1965
- Abolished: 1967
- Editions: 3
- Location: Marseille; France
- Surface: Clay / outdoor (1967); Wood / indoor (1965, 67)

The Marseille Pro Championships was a mens professional tennis tournament founded in 1965. Also known as the Marseille Pros it was played intermittently in Marseille, France until 1967.

== History ==
The tournament features two subsidiary events, a spring championships played outdoors on clay courts, and an autumn championships, played on indoor wood courts.

== Finals ==
=== Singles (Spring) ===
Year	Champion	Runners-up	Score
1967	(Australia) Rod Laver	(United States) Dennis Ralston	6–4, 6–3

=== Singles (Autumn) ===
Year	Champion	Runners-up	Score
1965	(Australia) Ken Rosewall	(Australia) Frank Sedgman	6–2, 7–5
1967	(France) Pierre Barthes	(Australia) Fred Stolle	2–6, 9–7, 11–9
