= San Antonio Invitational =

Defunct tennis tournament
- Founded: 1930
- Abolished: 1967
- Location: San Antonio, Texas; United States
- Venue: San Antonio Country Club
- Surface: Clay / outdoors

The San Antonio Invitational also known as the San Antonio Invitation was a men's USLTA/ILTF affiliated clay court tennis tournament founded in 1930. It was first played at the San Antonio Country Club, San Antonio, Texas, United States. The tournament was not played on permanent basis and stopped during world war two. The venue revived the event 1952, it continued to be staged through till 1967 when it was discontinued.

== Finals ==
=== Singles ===
(incomplete roll included).

Year	Winners	Runners-up	Score
1930	(United States) Wilmer Allison	(United States) Berkeley Bell	6-3, 0-6, 7-5, 4-6, 6-3
1952	(United States) Gardnar Mulloy	(United States) Art Larsen	6-2, 6-4, 6-4
1953	(United States) Gardnar Mulloy	(United States) Art Larsen	1-6, 8-6, 6-1, 9-7
1965	(United States) Dennis Ralston	(Australia) Roy Emerson	6-4, 4-6, 7-5
1966	(Australia) Tony Roche	(United States) Dennis Ralston	6-2, 6-3
1967	(Australia) John Newcombe	(Australia) Tony Roche	6-3, 6-2
