= Sydney Metropolitan Grass Court Championships =

Defunct tennis tournament
- Event name: part of Strathfield Open
- Tour: ILTF
- Founded: 1892
- Abolished: 1975
- Location: Strathfield; Sydney, New South Wales; Australia
- Venue: Strathfield Recreation Club
- Surface: Grass / outdoor

The Sydney Metropolitan Grass Court Championships was a combined grass court ILTF affiliated tennis tournament founded in 1892 as the Metropolitan Championship of Sydney an asphalt court event. Also known locally as the Metropolitan Grass Court Championships, the tournament was played at the Strathfield Recreation Club, Strathfield, Sydney, New South Wales, Australia until 1975.

This event formed part of the programme of the larger Strathfield Open.

== History ==
From 1892 to 1896 the event carried the joint name of the Asphalt Championship of the New South Wales, with winning players assuming both titles.

In 1897 the event was switched to grass courts and rebranded for the duration of its run.
