= Binghamton Pro Championships =

Defunct tennis tournament
- Tour: NTL Pro Tour
- Founded: 1966; 59 years ago
- Abolished: 1969; 56 years ago
- Location: Binghamton, New York, United States
- Venue: Highland Racquet & Riding Club
- Surface: Hard / outdoor

The Binghamton Pro Championships was a men's and women's professional tennis tournament first held in 1966. Also known as the Binghamton Masters or NTL Masters Championships it was first played on outdoor hard courts at the Highland Racquet & Riding Club, Binghamton, New York, United States. The event ran for tfree editions until 1968.

== History ==
The Binghamton Pro Championships was a men's and women's professional tennis tournament founded in 1966. It was played at the Highland Racquet & Riding Club, Binghamton, New York, United States. The initial tournament offered a prize fund of $25,000, and used the VASS scoring system. Also known as the Binghamton Masters Pro, in 1968 the event became part of the National Tennis League and for that tour was branded as the NTL Masters Championships.

== Finals ==
=== Men's singles ===
Year	Champions	Runners-up	Score
1966	(Australia) Rod Laver	(United States) Pancho Segura	31–28, 31–18.
1967	(Australia) Rod Laver	(Spain) Andrés Gimeno	7–6, 6–3.
1968	(Spain) Andrés Gimeno	(Australia) Fred Stolle	6–4, 6–1.
1969	(Australia) Rod Laver	(United States) Pancho Gonzales	6–4, 6–1.

=== Women's singles ===
Year	Champions	Runners-up	Score
1968	(United States) Billie Jean King	(United States) Rosie Casals	10–8, 6–2

=== Mixed doubles ===
Year	Champions	Runners-up	Score
1968	(Australia) Roy Emerson (United States) Billie Jean King	(Australia) Fred Stolle (France) Francoise Durr	10–7
