= Droitwich Open Hard Courts =

Defunct tennis tournament
- Event name: Bio-Strath Droitwich Open Hard Courts (1971)
- Tour: ILTF Circuit (1968-1969); Bio-Strath Circuit, (1970-1971); ILTF Circuit (1972-1974)
- Founded: 1968
- Abolished: 1974
- Location: Droitwich Spa, Droitwich, Worcestershire, England.
- Venue: Droitwich Tennis Club
- Surface: Clay

The Droitwich Open Hard Courts, also known as the Bio-Strath Droitwich Open Hard Courts or Bio-Strath Droitwich for sponsorship reasons, was a combined men's and women's clay court tennis tournament founded in 1968. The tournament was organised by the Droitwich Spa Lawn Tennis Club (now called the Droitwich Tennis Club), and played at the Brine Baths Park (now called Droitwich Lido Park), Droitwich Spa, Worcestershire, England. The tournament ran until 1974 then was discontinued.

== History ==
In 1928 as the Droitwich Open Lawn Tennis Tournament was founded. This tournament was played on grass courts and staged annually through till 1939 when it was discontinued. In October 1967 Droitwich Tennis Club applied to the Lawn Tennis Association to restart a new open tennis hard court tournament that was to begin in 1968. In May 1968 the first Droitwich Open Hard Courts tournament was held. In 1971 that event became part of the Bio-Strath Circuit under the brand name the Bio-Starth Droitwich Open Hard Courts.

== Venue ==
Droitwich Spa Lawn Tennis Club was founded in 1920. It staged the first Droitwich Open in 1928. The club was located in what was then called Brine Baths Park (now called Droitwich Lido Park), Droitwich Spa, Worcestershire. The original club had 4 grass courts and 4 hard courts (clay). In 1975 Droitwich Tennis Club moved to its current location at St Peters Church Lane. The club still has the eight courts, they no longer have the original grass or clay courts, instead they are a combination of hard cement and artificial grass courts.

== Finals ==
=== Men's singles ===
(Incomplete list)

Year	Winners	Runners-up	Score
1968	(Australia) Bob Howe	(Australia) Ken Hiskins	6–1, 6–1
↓ Open era ↓
1969	(United Kingdom) Simon Partridge	(United Kingdom) A. Punell	6–2, 6–0
1970	(Australia) Peter Doerner	(South Africa) Mel Baleson	6–0, 7–5
1971	(Australia) Peter Doerner (2)	(Australia) John Manderson	6–0, 7–5
1972	(Australia) John Trickey	(United Kingdom) Malcolm Titcomb	6–2, 6–0

=== Women's singles ===
(Incomplete list)

Year	Winners	Runners-up	Score
1968	(United Kingdom) Janice Townsend	(South Africa) Brenda Kirk	6–2 12–10
↓ Open era ↓
1969	(Australia) Kerry Melville	(Argentina) Beatriz Araujo	6–4, 3–6, 7–5
1970	(Ecuador) María Guzmán	(Australia) Sandra Walsham	6–2 12–10
1971	(Ecuador) María Guzmán (2)	(Australia) Sandra Walsham	2–6, 6–2, 6–2
1972	(United Kingdom) Charlotte Bastin	(United Kingdom) S. Preece	6–2, 6–3

== See also ==
- Droitwich Open (grass court event)
