= Wolverhampton Open =

Defunct tennis tournament
- Event name: Wolverhampton Lawn Tennis Tournament (1897-1900); Wolverhampton Tennis Tournament (1903-30); Wolverhampton Open Lawn Tennis Tournament (1931-49); Wolverhampton Open (1950-69); Bio-Strath Wolverhampton Open (1970-71); Wolverhampton Open (1972-74)
- Tour: ILTF (1913-1969); Bio-Strath Circuit (1971)
- Founded: 1897; 129 years ago
- Abolished: 1974; 52 years ago
- Location: Wolverhampton, West Midlands, England
- Venue: Parkdale, Wolverhampton, Staffordshire, Midlands
- Surface: Clay- outdoors

The Wolverhampton Open was a combined men's and women's grass court tennis tournament founded in 1897 as the Wolverhampton Lawn Tennis Tournament. The first tournament was staged at Parkdale, Wolverhampton from 1897 to 1900 before it was discontinued in 1900. In 1903 a second tournament was revived and played in Newbridge, in Wolverhampton, where it ran until 1974.

== History ==
The Wolverhampton Open was established as the Wolverhampton Lawn Tennis Tournament in 1897, under auspices of the Albert Lawn Tennis Club, Parkdale, Wolverhampton, Staffordshire, Midlands - before it was discontinued in 1900. In 1903 a second Wolverhampton tournament was revived by Wolverhampton Lawn Tennis Club, in Newbridge. In 1931 the tournament was renamed as the Wolverhampton Open Lawn Tennis Tournament. By the 1950s it was branded as the Wolverhampton Open and ran until 1974. In 1970 the event was marketed under the brand name the Bio-Strath Wolverhampton Open as part of the Bio-Strath Circuit, it remained part of that tour through till 1971.

Notable winners of the men's singles title included; Sydney Howard Smith, Cam Malfroy, George Lyttleton-Rogers, Claude Lister, Tony Pickard, Bill Hoogs Jr., Frew McMillan, and Andrew Pattison. Winners of the women's singles title included; Phoebe Holcroft Watson, Dorothy Holman, Rita Bentley, Angela Mortimer, Ann Haydon Jones, Faye Toyne, Mary Habicht, Kerry Melville and Valerie Ziegenfuss.

== Venues ==
The Albert Lawn Tennis Club was founded at Parkdale, Wolverhampton, Staffordshire around 1894. It staged the first Wolverhampton tennis tournament until 1900. In 1903 a second Wolverhampton tournament was revived by the Wolverhampton Lawn Tennis Club (f. 1885), in Newbridge, Wolverhampton.

== Finals ==
=== Men's singles ===
(incomplete roll)

Year	Winners	Runners-up	Score
↓ LTA Circuit ↓
Wolverhampton Lawn Tennis Tournament
1897	(United Kingdom) Sydney Howard Smith	(United Kingdom) Charles Henry Ridding	6–0, ret.
1898	(United Kingdom) Sydney Howard Smith (2)	(United Kingdom) Wilberforce Eaves	6–3, 3–6, 6–4, 6–2.
1900	(United Kingdom) Wilberforce Eaves	(United Kingdom) John Mycroft Boucher	7–5, 7–5, 6–3.
Wolverhampton Tennis Tournament
1905	(United Kingdom) Edward Roy Allen	(United Kingdom) Alfred Beamish	4–6, 2–6, 6–3, 8–6, 6–4.
1910	(United Kingdom) Edward Joseph Sampson	(United Kingdom) Xenophon Kasdaglis	6–2, 8–6.
↓ ILTF Circuit ↓
1915/1919	Not held (due to World War I)		
1924	(India) Hassan Ali Fyzee	(United Kingdom) Edward (Teddy) Higgs	3-2 sets.
1929	(United Kingdom) Donald Greig	(United Kingdom) George Meredith	6–2, 7–5.
Wolverhampton Open Lawn Tennis Tournament
1930	(United Kingdom) George Meredith	(United Kingdom) Thomas Slater	6–4, 3–6, 6–3.
1934	(Australia) Cam Malfroy	(Japan) Ryuki Miki	6–2, 6–1.
1935	(Republic of Ireland) George Lyttleton Rogers	(Italy) Umberto De Morpurgo	6–3, 8–6.
1939	(United Kingdom) Jack Moore	(United Kingdom) Claude Lister	2–6, 6–1, 7–5.
1940/1946	Not held (due to World War II)		
1947	(United Kingdom) Claude Lister	(United Kingdom) Jack Moore	4–6, 7–5, 9–7.
1948	(United Kingdom) Claude Lister (2)	(United Kingdom) John B. Griffith	8–6, 9–7.
1949	(United Kingdom) Claude Lister (3)	(United Kingdom) John B. Griffith	6–4, 6–3.
Wolverhampton Open
1950	(United Kingdom) W.P.W. Anderson	(United Kingdom) George Godsell	6–3, 2–6, 6–2.
1951	(United Kingdom) N.E. Hooper	(United Kingdom) J.B. Payne	6–1, 6–1.
1952	(United Kingdom) Rex H. Hack	(United Kingdom) John C. Upton	6–4, 6–3.
1953	(United Kingdom) J.C. Upton	(United Kingdom) K.G. Jones	6–4, 6–1.
1954	(United Kingdom) Claude Lister (4)	(United Kingdom) K.G. Jones	6–2, 8–6.
1955	(United Kingdom) M.A. Harris	(United Kingdom) L.M. Kilby	6–2, 7–5.
1956	(United Kingdom) M.L. Booth	(United Kingdom) L.M. Kilby	6–4, 6–2.
1957	(United Kingdom) K.G. Jones	(United Kingdom) P.G. Wainwright	4–6, 6–1, 6–2.
1959	(South Africa) Robin Sanders	(South Africa) John Maloney	4–6, 6–4, 6–1.
1960	(United Kingdom) Tony Pickard	(South Africa) David Samaai	6–2, 5–7, 6–3.
1961	(Australia) Will Coghlan	(United Kingdom) Roger Taylor	6–4, 6–1.
1962	(South Africa) Frew McMillan	(Australia) John B. Hillebrand	6–4, 6–4.
1963	(South Africa) Frew McMillan (2)	(United Kingdom) Roy W. Dixon	6–4, 4–6, 7–5
1964	(United Kingdom) Billy Knight	(South Africa) Frew McMillan	6–3, 4–6, 6–4.
1965	(United Kingdom) Billy Knight (2)	(Chile) Patricio Cornejo	9–7, 6–3.
1966	(United States) Bill Hoogs Jr.	(New Zealand) Onny Parun	6–4, 8–6.
1967	(United Kingdom) Jaroslav Drobný	(United Kingdom) Billy Knight	6–8, 6–4, 6–3.
1968	(Canada) Keith Carpenter	(South Africa) Graydon Garner	6–4, 7–5.
↓ Open era ↓
Bio-Strath Wolverhampton Open
1970	(South Africa) Frew McMillan (3)	(Rhodesia) Hank Irvine	6–4, 4–6, 6–4.
1971	(Rhodesia) Andrew Pattison	(Australia) Peter Doerner	6–3, 6–2.
Wolverhampton Open
1974	(Australia) Alvin Gardiner	(United Kingdom) Roger Webb	6–2, 6–2.

=== Women's singles ===
(incomplete roll)

Year	Winners	Runners-up	Score
↓ ILTF Circuit ↓
Wolverhampton Tennis Tournament
1920	(United Kingdom) Marie Hazel	(United Kingdom) Mrs South	6–1, 6–2
1921	(United Kingdom) Marie Hazel (2)	(United Kingdom) Mrs Bellord	6–3, 6–0
1922	(United Kingdom) Marie Hazel (3)	(United Kingdom) Miss Wynne	6–1, 6–0
1923	(United Kingdom) Marie Hazel (4)	(United Kingdom) Phoebe Holcroft	6–4, 7–5
1924	(United Kingdom) Jessie Russell Colegate	(United Kingdom) Marie Hazel	6–0, 6–2
1925	(United Kingdom) Irene Maltby	(United Kingdom) Kathleen Lidderdale Bridge	6–4, 4–6, 6–3
1926	(United Kingdom) M. Wynne	(United Kingdom) Irene Maltby	6–2, 6–4
1927	(United Kingdom) Marie Hazel (5)	(United Kingdom) Irene Maltby	6–1, 6–8, 8–6
1928	(United Kingdom) Dorothy Round	(United Kingdom) Marie Hazel	8–6, 4–6, 6–3
1930	(United Kingdom) Dorothy Round (2)	(United Kingdom) Marie Hazel	6–1, 6–2
Wolverhampton Open Lawn Tennis Tournament
1931	(United Kingdom) Phoebe Holcroft Watson	(United Kingdom) Jackie McAlpine	6–3, 6–2
1932	(United Kingdom) Dorothy Round (3)	(United Kingdom) Mrs H. Page	6–1, 6–2
1933	(United Kingdom) Mie Johnstone	(United Kingdom) Mrs H. Page	6–3, 6–4
1934	(United Kingdom) Dorothy Round (4)	(United Kingdom) Grace Vaughton	6–1, 6–2
1935	(United Kingdom) Christabel Wheatcroft	(United Kingdom) Gladys Southwell	6–3, 6–3
1936	(United Kingdom) Christabel Wheatcroft (2)	(Bermuda) Barbara Freisenbruch	6–0, 6–2
1937	(United Kingdom) Mrs H. Page	(United Kingdom) Isobel Cooke	7–5, 6–1
1939	(United Kingdom) Elsie Hamilton	(United Kingdom) Mary Norman	6–4, 6–3
1940/1946	Not held (due to World War II)		
1947	(United Kingdom) Sally Stoney Lister	(United Kingdom) Elsie Hamilton Phillips	6–1, 6–4
1948	(United Kingdom) Sally Stoney Lister (2)	(United Kingdom) Isabel Follows	6–2, 6–2
1949	(United Kingdom) Elsie Hamilton Phillips	(United Kingdom) Patricia Cowney	8–6, 6–3
Wolverhampton Open
1950	(United Kingdom) Patricia Cowney	(United Kingdom) Gillian Gittings Worrall	6–3, 6–3
1951	(United Kingdom) Elsie Hamilton Phillips (2)	(United Kingdom) Molly Wadlow Stone	6–2, 6–2
1952	(United Kingdom) Elsie Hamilton Phillips (3)	(United Kingdom) Molly Wadlow Stone	6–3, 6–3
1953	(United Kingdom) Y. Toyne	(United Kingdom) L. Bishop	6–4, 0–6, 6–4
1954	(United Kingdom) Sally Stoney Lister (3)	(United Kingdom) Jane Godfrey	7–5, 6–3
1955	(United Kingdom) Molly Wadlow Stone	(United Kingdom) Jane Godfrey	12–10, 3–6, 7–5
1956	(United Kingdom) Valerie Pitt	(United Kingdom) Molly Wadlow Stone	6–4, 6–1
1957	(United Kingdom) Mrs R. Worrall	(United Kingdom) Mrs L. Newman	3–6, 6–0, 6–1
1958	(United Kingdom) Rita Bentley	(United Kingdom) Hazel Austin Cheadle	8–6, 6–2
1959	(United Kingdom) Angela Mortimer	(United Kingdom) Ann Haydon	6–1, 6–4
1960	(United Kingdom) Angela Mortimer (2)	(United Kingdom) Rita Bentley	8–6, 9–7
1961	(United Kingdom) Ann Haydon	(Australia) Lynn Hutchings	6–0, 6–1
1962	(United Kingdom) Hazel Cheadle	(Republic of Ireland) Eleanor O'Neill	6–1, 1–6, 6–3
1963	(United Kingdom) Ann Haydon Jones (2)	(South Africa) Renée Schuurman	9–7, 1–6, 6–4
1964	(Australia) Faye Toyne	(United Kingdom) Alison Stroud	6–1, 6–3
1965	(Brazil) Mary Habicht	(United Kingdom) Jean Haskew	4–6, 6–4, 6–1
1966	(United Kingdom) Susan Tutt	(United Kingdom) Jean Haskew	6–1, 6–1
1968	(United States) Valerie Ziegenfuss	(United Kingdom) Janice Townsend	divided title
↓ Open era ↓
Bio-Strath Wolverhampton Open
1970	(Australia) Kerry Melville	(Australia) Sue Alexander	6–2, 6–2
1971	(United Kingdom) Janice Townsend Wainwright	(Ecuador) Maria Guzman	6–3, 6–2
Wolverhampton Open
1974	(Australia) Jenny Dimond	(United Kingdom) Jenny Helliar	2–6, 6–1, 6–1

== Event Names ==
- Wolverhampton Lawn Tennis Tournament (1897–1900)
- Wolverhampton Tennis Tournament (1903–30)
- Wolverhampton Open Lawn Tennis Tournament (1931–49)
- Wolverhampton Open (1950–69)
- Bio-Strath Wolverhampton Open (1970–71)
- Wolverhampton Open (1972–74)
