= Keswick Open Hard Courts =

Defunct tennis tournament
- Tour: ILTF Circuit
- Founded: 1934; 91 years ago
- Abolished: 1967; 58 years ago
- Location: Keswick, Cumbria, England
- Venue: Fitz Park
- Surface: Clay

The Keswick Open Hard Courts was a men's and women's clay court tennis tournament founded in 1934 as the Lakeland Open. The tournament was organised by the Keswick Lawn Tennis Club, and played at Fitz Park, Keswick, Cumbria, England. It was played annually until 1967.

== History ==
In August 1889 the Keswick Open was first held for the first time. The tournament was organised by the Keswick Lawn Tennis Club, and played at Fitz Park, Keswick, Cumbria, England. It was held annually until 1910 when it was discontinued as part of the LTA Circuit.

In 1934 the Keswick Lawn Tennis Club established a new successor event called the Lakeland Open that was also played at Fitz Park, but this time on hard clay courts, that event ran until 1939, when it was briefly supsepended due to World War Two. In 1941 the tournament was revived under a new name the Keswick Open Hard Courts tournament. In 1960 the event was held in conjunction with the Cumberland County Championships. The event ran until 1967 when it was abolished.

== Finals ==
=== Men's singles ===
(Incomplete list)

Lakeland Open
Year	Winners	Runners-up	Score
1934	(Philippines) Herby Aldred	(United Kingdom) Laurie Shaffi	6–3, 6–3
1938	(Romania) Constantin Tanacescu	(United Kingdom) Eric Filby	6–2, 4–6, 7–5
1939	(Romania) Constantin Tanacescu (2)	(United Kingdom) Angus Smith	6–0, 6–2
Keswick Open Hard Courts
1948	(Argentina) Heraldo Weiss	(United Kingdom) Gerry Oakley	6–4, 3–6, 6–4
1951	(Poland) Ignacy Tłoczyński	(Poland) Czeslaw Spychala	6–4, 3–6, 6–4
1956	(United Kingdom) Eric Dixon	(United Kingdom) John Tuton	6–2, 6–2
1957	(United Kingdom) Ken Riley	(United Kingdom) Chris Norris	6–3, 6–4
1963	(United Kingdom) Bobby Wilson	(United Kingdom) Roger Becker	7–5, 7–5
1964	(United Kingdom) Bobby Wilson (2)	(Philippines) Guillermo Hernandez	6–3, 3–6, 6–3
1965	(Rhodesia) Roger Dowdeswell	(United Kingdom) Tony Pickard	6–2, 5–7, 6–2

=== Women's singles ===
(Incomplete list)

Lakeland Open
Year	Winners	Runners-up	Score
1934	(United Kingdom) Dorothy Round	(India) Olga Webb	6–0, 6–2
1936	(United Kingdom) Christabel Hardie Wheatcroft	(United Kingdom) Rita Jarvis	7–5, 6–4
1937	(United Kingdom) Christabel Hardie Wheatcroft (2)	(United Kingdom) Cecily Hartley Marriott	8–6, retd.
1938	(United Kingdom) Rosemary Thomas	(United Kingdom) Olga Webb MacInnes	6–4, 6–3
1939	(Norway) Laila Schou-Nilsen	(United Kingdom) Mrs J. Selwyn James	6–2, 6–3
Keswick Open Hard Courts
1949	(Argentina) Mary Terán de Weiss	(United Kingdom) Dorothy Round Little	6-4, 6-3
1951	(United Kingdom) Shirley Bloomer	(United Kingdom) Joy Mottram	6–4, 6–4
1962	(United Kingdom) Louise Grundy	(United Kingdom) Mrs G. Bowman	6–2, 6–2
1963	(Argentina) Norma Baylon	(United Kingdom) Vera Roberts	4–6, 6–2, 6–4
