= Keswick Cricket Club =

English cricket club

Keswick Cricket Club is an English Cricket club based in the Lake District. Founded in the 1880s, its home games are played at Fitz Park, which in 2001 was voted 'The Loveliest Cricket Ground in England' by Wisden Cricket Monthly.

== Teams ==
The 1st team play in the North Lancashire and Cumbria Cricket League, Premier Division. The 2nd team play in the Eden Valley Cricket League, 3rd Division. Keswick Cricket Club have junior U11, U13, U15 teams and also a women's Cricket team.

== Professional players ==
Keswick employed their first professional cricketer, Jason Young, in 2000. Since then the following professionals have played for the club: Madjid Jahangir, Mansoor Ahmed, Ata-ur-Rehman, Dinuka Hettiarachchi, Darren Hickey and Paul Hindmarch, current professional is Geeth Kumara,

== Current 1XI Squad ==
1. Glen Weightman*†
2. Dan Gaskell
3. Ben Sharp
4. Sam Sharp
5. Simon Grisdale
6. Geeth Kumara
7. James Benson
8. Arran Davies
9. Jonathan Hodgson
10. Stephen Hindmarch
11. Andy Clark
12. Andrew Rigg
13. James Mcgown

== Trophies ==
Keswick Cricket Club won the Burton Cup in 1996, their first trophy. This success was followed by winning the Cumbria Cricket League in 1997. The club won the Higson Cup for the first time in 2006, the trophy then returned to the Fitz Park club in 2012. Most recently, Keswick lifted the county cup for the first time in 2013, defeating Furness in a tense final.
