= Droitwich Open =

Defunct tennis tournament
- Tour: ILTF Grand Prix circuit, (1928–39)
- Founded: 1928
- Abolished: 1939
- Location: Droitwich Spa, Droitwich, Worcestershire, England.
- Surface: Grass

The Droitwich Open also known as the Droitwich Spa Open was a combined men's and women's tennis tournament founded in 1928 as the Droitwich Open Lawn Tennis Tournament or Droitwich Spa Open Open Lawn Tennis Tournament. The tournament was organised by the Droitwich Spa Lawn Tennis Club (now called the Droitwich Tennis Club), and played at the Brine Baths Park (now called Droitwich Lido Park), Droitwich Spa, Worcestershire, England. The tournament ran until 1939 just before World War II then was discontinued.

== History ==
In 1928 the Droitwich Open Lawn Tennis Tournament was founded. This tournament was played on grass court and staged annually through till 1939 when it was discontinued. In October 1967 Droitwich Tennis Club applied to the Lawn Tennis Association to restart a new open tennis hard court tournament that was to begin in 1968. In May 1968 the first Droitwich Open Hard Courts tournament was held. In 1971 that event became part of the Bio-Strath Circuit under the brand name the Bio-Starth Droitwich Open Hard Courts.

== Venue ==
Droitwich Spa Lawn Tennis Club was founded in 1920. It staged the first Droitwich Open in 1928. The club was located in what was then called Brine Baths Park (now called Droitwich Lido Park), Droitwich Spa, Worcestershire. The original club had four grass courts and four hard courts (clay). In 1975 Droitwich Tennis Club moved to its current location at St Peters Church Lane. The club still has the eight tennis courts. They no longer have the original grass or clay courts, but a combination of hard and artificial grass courts.

== Finals ==
=== Men's singles ===
(Incomplete list)

Year	Winners	Runners-up	Score
1929	(United Kingdom) Alfred Pearson	(United Kingdom) Don Butler	6–3, 6–1
1931	(United Kingdom) Don Butler	(United Kingdom) E. M. Sykes	6–3, 2–6, 6–3
1933	(United Kingdom) Don Butler (2)	(United Kingdom) Ronald Shayes	6–4, 1–6, 6–2
1934	(New Zealand) Cam Malfroy	(United Kingdom) Don Butler	6–4, 3–6, 8–6
1935	(United Kingdom) Don Butler (3)	(United Kingdom) George Godsell	6–3, 6–2
1936	(United Kingdom) George Godsell	(United Kingdom) Henry Billington	6–3, 3–6, 7–5
1937	(United Kingdom) Ronald Shayes	(United Kingdom) George Godsell	6–4, 6–4, 6–3
1938	(Romania) Alexander M. Hamburger	(United Kingdom) Ronald Shayes	6–3, 3–6, 6–2
1939	(Romania) Alexander M. Hamburger (2)	(United Kingdom) G.R.M. Ricketts	6–0, 7–5

=== Women's singles ===
(Incomplete list)

Year	Winners	Runners-up	Score
1928	(United Kingdom) Vera Marshall	(United Kingdom) Vera Noott	6–3, 6–2
1929	(United Kingdom) Miss Elizabeth T. Madin	(United Kingdom) Vera Marshall	6–4, 6–4
1931	(United Kingdom) Vera Noott	(United Kingdom) Mrs H. O'Connor	6–1, 6–4
1932	(United Kingdom) Jeanette Morfey	(United Kingdom) Gladys Clarke-Jervoise	6–3, 6–0
1933	(United Kingdom) Florence Ford	(United Kingdom) Mary Whitmarsh	6–4, 6–4
1934	(United Kingdom) Florence Ford (2)	(United Kingdom) Joy Cunningham	6–3, 6–3
1935	(United Kingdom) Florence Ford (3)	(United Kingdom) Joy Cunningham	6–3, 6–2
1936	(United Kingdom) Dorothy Round	(United Kingdom) Florence Ford	6–4, 6–4
1937	(United Kingdom) Florence Ford (4)	(United Kingdom) Betty Batt	2–6, 6–2, 6–2
1938	(United Kingdom) Gertrude Valentine-Brown	(United Kingdom) Florence Ford	6–2, 1–6, 6–4
1939	(United Kingdom) Gertrude Valentine-Brown (2)	(United Kingdom) Madge Slaney	4–6 7–5 6–1

== See also ==
- Droitwich Open Hard Courts (clay court tournament)
