= Edward Dearman =

British tennis player

- Full name: Edward Alfred Dearman
- Country (sports): Great Britain
- Born: 13 June 1904 Putney, London, England
- Died: 12 September 1979 (aged 75) Sutton, London, England
- Turned pro: 1923 (ILTF amateur tour)
- Retired: 1936

Singles
- Career record: 46–18
- Career titles: 1

Grand Slam singles results
- Wimbledon: 1R (1927)

Doubles

Grand Slam doubles results
- Wimbledon: 2R (1929, 1933)

Grand Slam mixed doubles results
- Wimbledon: 3R (1928)

Edward Alfred Dearman (13 June 1904 – 12 September 1979) was a British tennis player, then later solicitor. He competed at the Wimbledon Championships in singles in 1927. He was active from 1923 to 1936 contesting 6 career singles finals and won 1 title.

== Career ==
Edward Alfred Dearman was born on 13 June 1904 in Putney, London, England. He played his first tournament in 1923 at the Hunaston Open where he reached the final, but lost to Basil Ranger Lawrence. He competed at the Wimbledon Championships on six occasions between 1927 and 1934. he took part in the men's doubles competition five times. He also played in the mixed doubles events with his sister Evelyn Dearman four times.

He was a quarter finalist at the Angmering-on-Sea Open in 1926. In 1928 he took part in the Bermuda Championships in Hamilton, Bermuda but lost in the early rounds. He won his one and only singles title at the Brockenhurst Open in 1932. In 1936 he traveled to Germany to play in a number of tournaments including the Baden Baden International, he played his last singles event at The Homburg Cup that year. He died on 12 September 1979 in Sutton, London, England.

== Career finals ==
=== Singles (6), titles (1), runners up (5) ===
Category + (Titles)
Grand Slam/World Championship (0)
National (0)
Regular (1)

Titles by Surface
Clay – Outdoor (0)
Grass – Outdoor (1)
Hard – Outdoor (0)
Carpet – Indoor (0)
Wood – Indoor (0)

No	Result	Date	Tournament	Surface	Opponent	Score
1.	Loss	1923	Hunaston Open	Grass	(United Kingdom) Basil Ranger Lawrence	3–6, 3–6.
2.	Loss	1930	Felixstowe Hard Courts	Clay	(United Kingdom) Gordon Crole-Rees	3–6, 11–9, 1–6.
3.	Loss	1930	Stroud Open	Grass	(United Kingdom) George Godsell	w.o.
1.	Win	1932	Brockenhurst Open	Grass	(Republic of Ireland) Noel Galway Holmes	6–1, 6–3.
4.	Loss	1934	Brockenhurst Open	Grass	(United Kingdom) Guy Cooper	4–6, 5–7.
5.	Loss	1936	Brockenhurst Open	Grass	(United Kingdom) Guy Cooper	5–7, 1–6.

== Other sports ==
He played cricket for the Marlborough College team and the Gonville and Caius College, Cambridge. He also played hockey for Cambridge University (Blue).

== Personal ==
Dearman was educated at Marlborough College 1921–1922); then went to study law at Gonville and Caius College, Cambridge (1924–1925). His sister Evelyn Dearman was also a tennis player. She was a three quarter finalist and semi finalist in the women's doubles.
