= Jason Young =

Jason Young may refer to:

- Jason Young (curler) (born 1979), Canadian curler
- Jason Young (baseball) (born 1979), Major League Baseball pitcher
- Jason Young (discus thrower) (born 1981), American discus thrower
- Jason Young (sprinter) (born 1991), Jamaican sprinter
- Jason Young (fighter) (born 1986), English mixed martial artist
- Jason Young (ice hockey) (born 1972), German-Canadian ice hockey player for the Frankfurt Lions
- Jason Young (Australian cricketer) (born 1971), Australian cricketer
- Jason Young (Zimbabwean cricketer) (born 1979), Zimbabwean cricketer
- Jason Young (actor) (born 1980), Thai actor and singer

== See also ==
- Jace Jung (born 2000), Major League Baseball player
