= Keswick Open =

Defunct tennis tournament
- Tour: LTA Circuit (1888-1910)
- Founded: 1888; 137 years ago
- Abolished: 1910; 115 years ago
- Location: Keswick, Cumbria, England
- Venue: Fitz Park
- Surface: Grass

The Keswick Open also known as the Keswick and Lake District Lawn Tennis Tournament was a men's and women's grass court tennis tournament founded in 1888. The tournament was organised by the Keswick Lawn Tennis Club, and played annually at Fitz Park, Keswick, Cumbria, England until 1910.

== History ==
The Keswick Open was first held in August 1889 the men's singles was won by George S. Back. The tournament was organised by the Keswick Lawn Tennis Club, and played at Fitz Park, Keswick, Cumbria, England. It was played annually until 1910 when it was discontinued as part of the LTA Circuit.

In 1934 the Keswick Lawn Tennis Club established a new successor event called the Lakeland Open that was also played at Fitz Park, but this time on hard clay courts, that event ran until 1939, when it was briefly suspended due to World War Two. In 1941 the tournament was revived under a new event name the Keswick Open Hard Courts tournament. In 1960 the tournament was held in conjunction with the Cumberland County Championships. The event ran until 1967 when it was abolished.

== Venue ==
Fitz Park is a public park and recreation ground that has been maintained by the Trustees of Fitz Park since 1891. The park is divided into two areas Upper Fitz Park and Lower Fitz Park covering 28 acres. Upper Fitz Park is the location of the Keswick & Braithwaite LTC where they operate 5 grass courts.

== Finals ==
=== Men's singles ===
(Incomplete list)

Year	Winners	Runners-up	Score
1888	(United Kingdom) George S. Back	(United Kingdom) Tancred Disraeli Cummins	6–1, 6–1
1889	(United Kingdom) Tancred Disraeli Cummins	(United Kingdom) A. Punell	6–2, 6–0
1890	(United Kingdom) Tancred Disraeli Cummins	(United Kingdom) Clement Cazalet	6–4, 3–6, 6–4
1891	(United Kingdom) Clement Cazalet	(United Kingdom) John Redfern Deykin	6–4, 6–3
1892	(Scotland) Richard Millar Watson	(United Kingdom) Edward Carey	6–3, 6–1
1895	(Australia) Les Poidevin	(United Kingdom) John Mycroft Boucher	6–3, 2–6, 6–2
1896	(United Kingdom) Norman Leslie Hallward	(United Kingdom) Clement Cazalet	6–3, 6–1
1900	(South Africa) Harold Aitken	(United Kingdom) ?	?

=== Women's singles ===
(Incomplete list)

Year	Winners	Runners-up	Score
1888	(United Kingdom) Lydia Cheetham	(United Kingdom) Florence Haines	5–7, 6–3, 6–2
1891	(Ireland) Ruth Dyas	(United Kingdom) Lila Ferrier	6-0, 6-4
1900	(United Kingdom) Agnes Morton	(United Kingdom) Constance Hill	6–3, 6–2
