= Hira-Lal Soni =

Indian tennis player

- Country (sports): India
- Born: 22 August 1906; India
- Died: 1979; Chandigarh-India
- Turned pro: 1924 (amateur tour)
- Retired: 1938

Singles
- Career titles: 2

Grand Slam singles results
- Wimbledon: 1R (1928, 1930, 1931, 1932)

Doubles

Grand Slam doubles results
- Wimbledon: 2R (1930)

Grand Slam mixed doubles results
- Wimbledon: 1R (1931)

Hira-Lal Soni (22 August 1906 – April 1979 ) was an Indian tennis player who competed at the Wimbledon Championships four times between 1928 and 1932. He was active from 1928 to 1938 and won 2 career titles.

== Career ==
Soni played his first known tournament in June 1924 at the Northern India Championships. In 1925 he competed at the Ceylon Championships where he reached the quarter finals. In 1926 he took part in the Southern India Championships where he reached the quarter finals. In 1928 he left for Europe for a tour of Europe.

In the spring of 1928 he won his first title at the Lucerne Spring International in Switzerland against Danish player Erik Worm. In July he played at the Wimbledon Championships for the first time where he lost in the first round to Hungarian Bela Von Kehrling. In August 1928 he competed at the Lucerne Championships held at the Lucerne Tennis Club, where he won his second singles title against Erik Worm. The same year he was a quarter finalist at the French Switzerland Championships.

In 1930 back in Europe touring, he went to Italy first to compete in the Alassio International where he made the final, before losing to Pat Hughes. In the summer he played Wimbledon again, but lost to the American player George Lott in the first round. Whilst in England he reached the final of the Angmering-on-Sea Open where he lost to Japanese player Ryuki Miki. He then left for France to play at the South of France Championships where he reached the quarter finals before losing to Bill Tilden.

In 1931 he took part in the Wimbledon Championships again and exited early in round one to Dickie Ritchie. He reached the final of the Angmering-on-Sea Open for the second consecutive year, where he was beaten again by Ryuki Miki. At the Northern Championships he made it to the semi-finals but lost to John Olliff. In 1932 he took part at Wimbledon again for the final time losing in the first round to David Herman.

Not playing tournaments in Europe again he reached the final of the Northern India Championships in 1936 before losing to Subba L.R. Sawhney. In 1938 he played his final known tournament at the Punjab Lawn Tennis Championships in Lahore, where he was again beaten by Subba Sawhney.

In team competitions he also played Davis Cup for India in 1928 and 1930.

== Career finals ==
=== Singles: 2 (2 titles, 5 runner-ups) ===
Legend (3–4)
Winner
Runner up

Result	No.	Date	Tournament	Location	Surface	Opponent	Score
Win	1.	1928	Lucerne Spring International	Lucerne	Clay	(Denmark) Erik Worm	6–3, 6–4, 14–12
Win	2.	1928	Lucerne Championships	Lucerne	Clay	(Denmark) Erik Worm	6–4, 6–4, 8–6
Loss	1.	1930	Alassio International	Alassio	Clay	(United Kingdom) Pat Hughes	6–1, 6–2, 6–2
Loss	2.	1930	Angmering-on-Sea Open	Angmering	Grass	(Japan) Ryuki Miki	5–7, 6–1, 6–4
Loss	3.	1931	Angmering-on-Sea Open	Angmering	Grass	(Japan) Ryuki Miki	6–4, 6–4
Loss	4.	1936	Northern India Championships	Lahore	Grass	(British Raj) Subba L.R. Sawhney	6–4, 6–1, 6–3
Loss	5.	1938	Punjab Lawn Tennis Championships	Lahore	Grass	(British Raj) Subba L.R. Sawhney	6–2, 6–1, 1–6, 6–1
