= Bio-Strath Circuit =

Defunct tennis tournament
- Tour: ILTF Grand Prix circuit, (1970–71)
- Founded: 1970
- Abolished: 1971
- Location: Cardiff–Wales; Birmingham–Midlands; Droitwich–Midlands; Edgbaston–Midlands; Exmouth–South West; Malvern–Midlands; London–South East; Lytham St Annes–North West; Sheffield–South Yorkshire; Stourbridge–Midlands; Solihull–Midlands; Wolverhampton–Midlands
- Surface: Clay; Grass; Hard

The Bio-Strath Circuit was a series tour of British tennis tournaments sponsored by the Swiss company Bio-Strath AG, a producer natural food supplements for sports people from 1970 to 1971. The circuit usually began in mid spring in April and ended in late summer in early August.

== History ==
The Bio-Strath tennis circuit was a series tour of British tennis tournaments that was sponsored by the Swiss company Bio-Strath AG. the circuit was inaugurated in May 1970 with six Midland tournaments, and one South East tournament.

Each tournament being a particular leg on the circuit beginning with the 1st leg, that usually started around early April, and ending with the 10th and final leg around the first week of August. In 1971 the circuit was extended to include two new North West England tournaments at Lytham St Annes, and The Bio-Strath Northern at Manchester, one new tournament in South Yorkshire the Bio-Strath Sheffield Tournament at Sheffield, another new event

Another new tournament was added for London the Bio-Strath Cumberland Hard Courts, In South Wales the Bio-Strath Cardiff tournament was added to the circuit, and another new event for North East England, the Bio-Strath Sunderland and Durham tournament The same year the Edgbaston tournament in the West Midlands was withdrawn, and replaced by the Bio-Strath Stourbridge tournament. In October 1971 Bio-Strath AG decided not to renew its sponsorship agreement with tournaments, due to disagreements of prize money and the circuit was discontinued.

== Results ==
1970 Bio Strath circuit

The Bio-Strath Circuit was part of the 1970 British Tournament Season. It began on 4 May in Birmingham, West Midlands, England with the first leg being the Bio-Strath Tally Ho event, and ended on 8 August with the tenth and final being the Bio-Strath West Warwickshire Open at Solihull.

=== 1970 Men's ===
Leg	Tournament	Dates				
Leg	Tournament	Dates	Men's Singles Winner	Men's Singles Finalist	Men's Doubles Winners	Men's Doubles Finalists
1st.	Bio-Strath Tally Ho	May, 4–9.	(United Kingdom) Stanley Matthews	(South Africa) Julian Krinsky	(Australia) Peter Doerner (Australia) Karl Coombes	(South Africa) Mel Baleson (South Africa) Julian Krinsky
2nd.	Bio-Strath Droitwich	May, 11–16.	(Australia) Peter Doerner	(South Africa) Mel Baleson	(Australia) Peter Doerner (Australia) Karl Coombes	(South Africa) Mel Baleson (South Africa) Julian Krinsky
3rd.	Bio-Strath London	May, 11–16.	(South Africa) Bob Maud	(South Africa) Keith Diepraam	(United States) Arthur Ashe (United States) Charlie Pasarell	(South Africa) Bob Maud (United Kingdom) Bobby Wilson
4th.	Bio-Strath Wolverhampton	May, 18–23.	(South Africa) Frew McMillan	(Rhodesia) Hank Irvine	(South Africa) Frew McMillan (Rhodesia) Hank Irvine	(Australia) Ian Bidmeade (Australia) Bill Joiner
5th.	Bio-Strath Malvern	July, 6–11.	(South Africa) Frew McMillan	(Rhodesia) Andrew Pattison	(United Kingdom) Stanley Matthews (South Africa) Frew McMillan	(Australia) Peter Doerner (Rhodesia) Andrew Pattison
6th.	Bio-Strath Edgbaston	July, 13–18.	(Rhodesia) Andrew Pattison	(Australia) Peter Doerner	(United Kingdom) Stanley Matthews (Australia) Peter Doerner	(Australia) Greg Perkins (South Africa) Mel Baleson
7th.	Bio-Strath West Warwickshire	August, 3–8.	(United Kingdom) Stanley Matthews	(United Kingdom) Paul Hutchins	(United Kingdom) Stanley Matthews (United Kingdom) Paul Hutchins	(Nigeria) Thompson Onibokun (United Kingdom) John Slater

=== 1970 Women's ===
Leg	Tournament	Dates				
Leg	Tournament	Dates	Women's Singles Winner	Women's Singles Finalist	Women's Doubles Winners	Women's Doubles Finalists
1st.	Bio-Strath Tally Ho	May, 4–9.	(United Kingdom) Janice Townsend	(Ecuador) Maria Guzman	(United Kingdom) Lesley Charles (United Kingdom) Wendy Slaughter	(United Kingdom) Mrs. S.M. Northern (Ecuador) María Guzmán
2nd.	Bio-Strath Droitwich	May, 11–16.	(Ecuador) Maria Guzman	(Australia) Sandra Walsham	(United Kingdom) Lesley Charles (United Kingdom) Janice Townsend	(Ecuador) Maria Guzman (France) Jacqueline Venturino
3rd.	Bio-Strath London	May, 11–16.	(United Kingdom) Ann Jones	(United Kingdom) Mrs. G.M. Williams	(Australia) Helen Gourlay (Rhodesia) / (South Africa) Pat Walkden	(United Kingdom) Ann Jones (United Kingdom) Mrs. G.M. Williams
4th.	Bio-Strath Wolverhampton	May, 18–23.	(Australia) Kerry Melville	(Australia) Sue Alexander	(Australia) Kerry Melville (United Kingdom) Rita Bentley	(Australia) Sue Alexander (Australia) Sandra Walsham
5th.	Bio-Strath Malvern	July, 6–11.	(Australia) Helen Gourlay	(Ecuador) Maria Guzman	(Australia) Helen Gourlay (United Kingdom) Janice Townsend	(Ecuador) Maria Guzman (United Kingdom) Marilyn Greenwood
6th.	Bio-Strath Edgbaston	July, 13–18.	(Australia) Sandra Walsham	(Argentina) Beatriz Araujo	(United Kingdom) Janice Townsend (Ecuador) Maria Guzman	(Australia) Sandra Walsham (Australia) Sue Alexander
7th.	Bio-Strath West Warwickshire	August, 3–8.	(United Kingdom) Janice Townsend	(United Kingdom) Marilyn Greenwood	(United Kingdom) Marilyn Greenwood (United Kingdom) Janice Townsend	(United Kingdom) Judy Congdon (United Kingdom) Sally Holdsworth

1971 Bio Strath circuit

The Bio-Strath Circuit was part of the 1971 British Tournament Season. The first leg of the circuit began on 9 April with the Bio-Strath Tally Ho event, and ended on 7 August with the thirteenth and final leg the Bio-Strath West Warwickshire Open at Solihull.

=== 1971 Men's ===
Incomplete roll

Leg	Tournament	Dates				
Leg	Tournament	Dates	Men's Singles Winner	Men's Singles Finalist	Men's Doubles Winners	Men's Doubles Finalists
1st.	Bio-Strath Tally Ho	April 9–12.	(Australia) Kim Warwick	(United Kingdom) Donald Oliver	(Australia) Colin Dibley (Australia) Peter Doerner	(United Kingdom) Stanley Matthews (United Kingdom) Donald Oliver
2nd.	Bio-Strath Cumberland	April 13–17.	(Australia) Ian Fletcher	(United Kingdom) Alan Mills	?	?
3rd.	Bio-Strath Sheffield	April 20–24	?	?	?	?
4th.	Bio-Strath London	May 10–16.	(Chile) Jaime Fillol	(United Kingdom) Gerald Battrick	?	?
5th.	Bio-Strath Droitwich	May 11–16.	(Australia) Peter Doerner	(Australia) John Manderson	?	?
6th.	Bio-Strath Wolverhampton	May 18–23.	(Rhodesia) Andrew Pattison	(Australia) Peter Doerner	?	?
7th.	Bio-Strath St. Annes	May 25–30.	(Australia) Kim Warwick	(Australia) John Manderson	?	?
8th.	Bio-Strath Northern	May 31-June 5	(Australia) Colin Dibley	(South Africa) Frew McMillan	?	?
9th.	Bio-Strath Cardiff	May 31-June 5.	(Rhodesia) Andrew Pattison	(India) Gaurav Misra	?	?
10th.	Bio-Strath Malvern	July 5–10.	(Australia) Peter Doerner	(United Kingdom) Stanley Matthews	?	?
11th.	Bio-Strath Sunderland and Durham	July 5–10.	(Australia) Kim Warwick	(Australia) John Manderson	?	?
12th.	Bio-Strath Stourbridge	July 26–31.	(United Kingdom) Stanley Matthews	(India) Gaurav Misra	?	?
13th.	Bio-Strath West Warwickshire	August 2–7.	(Australia) Kim Warwick	(Australia) Peter Doerner	?	?

=== 1971 Women's ===
Incomplete roll

Leg	Tournament	Dates				
Leg	Tournament	Dates	Women's Singles Winner	Women's Singles Finalist	Women's Doubles Winners	Women's Doubles Finalists
1st.	Bio-Strath Tally Ho	April 9–12.	(United Kingdom) Janice Townsend	(Ecuador) Maria Guzman	?	?
2nd.	Bio-Strath Cumberland	April 13–17.	(United Kingdom) Christine Truman Janes	(United Kingdom) Jill Cooper	(United Kingdom) Lesley Charles (United Kingdom) Wendy Slaughter	(Australia) Vicki Lancaster (Australia) Barbara Walsh
3rd.	Bio-Strath Sheffield	April 20–24	(United Kingdom) Lindsay Beaven	(United Kingdom) Lesley Charles	(New Zealand) Cecilie Fleming (Australia) Sue Hole	(United Kingdom) Lesley Charles (United Kingdom) Wendy Slaugheter
4th.	Bio-Strath London	May 11–16.	(United Kingdom) Ann Jones	(United Kingdom) Joyce Williams	(Australia) Helen Gourlay (Rhodesia) / (South Africa) Pat Walkden	(United Kingdom) Ann Jones (United Kingdom) Joyce Williams
5th.	Bio-Strath Droitwich	May 11–16.	(Ecuador) Maria Guzman	(Australia) Sandra Walsham	(United Kingdom) Lesley Charles (United Kingdom) Janice Townsend	(Ecuador) Maria Guzman (France) Jehane Venturino
6th.	Bio-Strath Wolverhampton	May 18–23.	(Australia) Kerry Melville	(Australia) Sue Alexander	(United Kingdom) Rita Bentley (Australia) Kerry Melville	(Australia) Sue Alexander (Australia) Sandra Walsham
7th.	Bio-Strath St. Annes	May 25–30.	(Australia) Sandra Walsham	(United Kingdom) Janice Townsend	(Australia) Sue Alexander (Australia) Sandra Walsham	(United Kingdom) Judy Congdon (United Kingdom) Janice Townsend
8th.	Bio-Strath Northern	May 31-June 5	(United States) Patti Hogan	(United States) Kris Kemmer	(United States) Patti Hogan (United Kingdom) Nell Truman	(South Africa) Esmé Emmanuel (United States) Ceci Martinez
9th.	Bio-Strath Cardiff	May 31-June 5.	(Japan) Kazuko Sawamatsu	(United Kingdom) Janice Wainwright	(Ecuador) Maria Guzman (United Kingdom) Janice Wainwright	(Australia) J. Harris (Canada) Andrée Martin
10th.	Bio-Strath Malvern	July 5–10.	(United Kingdom) Janice Wainwright	(United Kingdom) Lesley Charles	?	?
11th.	Bio-Strath Sunderland and Durham	July 5–10.	(United Kingdom) Lesley Charles	(Australia) Vicki Lancaster	(Ecuador) Maria Guzman (United Kingdom) Lesley Charles	(Australia) J. Harris (Australia) Vicki Lancaster
12th.	Bio-Strath Stourbridge	July 26–31.	(Republic of Ireland) Geraldine Barniville	(Ecuador) Maria Guzman	(United Kingdom) Lesley Charles (Australia) Vicki Lancaster	(Republic of Ireland) Geraldine Barniville (Ecuador) Maria Guzman
13th.	Bio-Strath West Warwickshire	August 2–7.	(United Kingdom) Lindsay Beaven	(Australia) Susan Alexander	(United Kingdom) Lesley Charles (United Kingdom) Janice Wainwright	(Australia) R. Murphy (Australia) Cynthia Sieler

== Circuit tournaments ==
1. Bio-Strath Cardiff Open. (joined 1971)
2. Bio-Strath Cumberland Hard Court Championships. (joined 1971)
3. Bio-Strath Droitwich Hard Courts.
4. Bio-Strath Edgbaston. (left 1971)
5. Bio-Strath London Hard Court Championships.
6. Bio-Strath Northern. (joined 1971)
7. Bio-Strath Malvern.
8. Bio-Strath Sheffield Tournament. (joined 1971)
9. Bio-Strath St Annes Open. (joined 1971)
10. Bio-Strath Stourbridge Open. (joined 1971)
11. Bio-Strath Sunderland and Durham. (joined 1971)
12. Bio-Strath Tally Ho.
13. Bio-Strath West Warwickshire Open.
14. Bio-Strath Wolverhampton Open.
