= Constantin Tănăsescu =

Romanian tennis player

- Country (sports): ROM
- Born: 31 March 1912 Romania
- Died: July 1997 (age 85) Las Vegas, United States
- Turned pro: 1921 (amateur tour); 1949 (pro tour)
- Retired: 1955

Singles
- Career titles: 18
- US Pro: QF (1954)

Constantin 'Tani' Tănăsescu (31 March 1912 – July 1997) was a Romanian tennis player. He was a quarter finalist at the 1954 U.S. Pro Tennis Championships.

He was active from 1921 to 1955 and won 18 career singles title during his time on the ILTF Circuit until 1947. In 1949 he turned pro and competed on the Pro tour until 1955.

== Tennis career ==
=== Amateur period ===
Constatin played his first senior tournament at the Harpenden Open at Harpenden in 1938 where he reached the final, before losing to Choy Wai-Chuen in four sets. The same year he won his first tournament at the Juan-Les-Pins Championships in France against Swedish player Ake Wallen.

His other career singles highlights include winning the 1939 – Beaulieu International (1939), the Cannes Beau Site New Year Meeting (1939), the East of England Championships (1939), the Hull Open (1939), the Keswick Hardcourts (1939), Monte Carlo Mid-Winter tournament (1939), Retford (1939). Sheffield and Hallamshire Championships (1939), the Sicilian International Championships (1939), the South of France Championships, the Tunbridge Wells Open and Cannes Beau Site New Year Meeting (1939), the Welsh Championships (1939), Capri (1940), the Romanian National Championships (1943), Matlock (1947) and the Midland Counties Championships (1947).

He was also a finalist at the Priory Whitsun Lawn Tennis Tournament (1938), Torneo Circolo Canottieri Roma (1939), Taormina, International (1939), Durham County Championships (1939), Monegasque Championships (1940), the Italian International Championships (1940), Capri (1940) and the Derbyshire Championships (1947).

In August 1947 he played his final and won his final amateur event at the Moseley Open at Moseley where he defeated Bill Moss in straight sets.

=== Professional period ===
In June 1949 he played at the Bakersfield Exhibition professional event played at the Bakersfield Racquet Club that included Dick Skeen, Bobby Harmon and Carl Earn. In June 1954 he took part in U.S. Pro Tennis Championships where he reached quarter finals stage before losing to Pancho Segura, he also took part in men's doubles event partnering with Pierre Pellizza. In November 1955 at this point residing in Santa Monica, California he played his final professional tournament at the U.S. Pro Hard Court Championships played in Beverly Hills, California where he was defeated by Bobby Riggs in the early rounds.

== Work ==
During the 1970s he worked as a trainer coach at the Riviera Country Club in Los Angeles, California.
