= Cumberland Hard Court Championships =

Defunct tennis tournament
- Event name: Cumberland Hard Court Championships (1927-70); Bio-Strath Cumberland Hard Court Championships (1971); Cumberland Club Hard Court Championships (1972–80); British Homes Store Cumberland Club Tournament (1981-86)
- Tour: ILTF Circuit (1913-70); Bio-Strath Circuit, (1970-71); ILTF Independent Tour (1972-86)
- Founded: 1927
- Abolished: 1985
- Location: Hampstead, London, England
- Venue: Cumberland Club
- Surface: Clay

The Cumberland Hard Court Championships or Cumberland Club Hard Court Championships and also known as the Cumberland Hard Court Tournament was a men's and women's clay court tennis tournament founded as in 1927. It was played at the Cumberland Club, Hampstead, London, England until tournament ended in 1986.

== History ==
The Cumberland Club Hard Court Championships were founded in 1927 and played at the Cumberland Club, Hampstead, England. In 1971 the tournament was incorporated into the Bio-Strath Circuit under the sponsorship name of the Bio-Strath Cumberland Hard Court Championships or simply the Bio-Strath Cumberland, where it was the second leg of circuit that year. In 1981 the British department store retail company British Home Stores took over sponsorship of the event, and it was branded as the British Homes Store Cumberland Club Tournament. The tournament ran through till 1986 as part of the ILTF Independent Tour then was discontinued.

== Finals ==
=== Men's singles ===
(incomplete roll)

Year	Winners	Runners-up	Score
↓ ILTF Circuit ↓
Cumberland Hard Court Championships
1931	(Japan) Jiro Satoh	(United Kingdom) Ted Avory	6-4, 6-3.
1934	(United Kingdom) Bunny Austin	(India) Man-Mohan Bhandari	6-2 6-1
1935	(United Kingdom) John Olliff	(United Kingdom) Frank Wilde	14-12, 6-2.
1936	(United Kingdom) Charles Hare	(United Kingdom) John Olliff	6-4, 6-3.
1937	(United Kingdom) Ronald Shayes	(United Kingdom) Edmund John David	6-4, 6-2.
1938	(Republic of China (1912–1949)) Wai-Chuen Choy	(United Kingdom) John Olliff	4-6, 6-2, 6-3.
1939/1946	Not held (due to World War II)		
1947	(United Kingdom) Howard Walton	(United Kingdom) Francis Wallis	4-6, 6-2, 6-2.
1948	(United Kingdom) Headley Baxter	(United Kingdom) Dennis Slack	6-2, 6-1
1949	(United Kingdom) Tony Mottram	(United Kingdom) Geoff Paish	6-2, 6-4.
1950	(Australia) Geoffrey Brown	(United Kingdom) Headley Baxter	6-2, 6-2.
1951	(United Kingdom) Tony Mottram (2)	(Australia) Peter Cawthorn	6-2, 6-1.
1952	(Australia) Peter Cawthorn	(United Kingdom) Gerry Oakley	6-3, 6-1.
1953	(United Kingdom) Roger Becker	(United Kingdom) Gerry Oakley	6-3, 6-4.
1954	(New Zealand) Jeff Robson	(United Kingdom) Billy Knight	6-3, 6-4.
1955	(United Kingdom) Billy Knight	(United Kingdom) Tony Mottram	1-6, 6-4, 6-2.
1956	(United Kingdom) Bobby Wilson	(United Kingdom) Mike Davies	1-6, 6-3, 7-5.
1957	(United Kingdom) Gerry Oakley	(United Kingdom) Tony Pickard	w.o.
1958	(United Kingdom) Bobby Wilson (2)	(United Kingdom) Gerry Oakley	7-5, 6-4.
1959	(New Zealand) Lew Gerrard	(United Kingdom) Roger Becker	6-3, 6-2.
1960	(United Kingdom) Bobby Wilson (3)	(United Kingdom) Norman Kitovitz	6-1, 6-2.
1961	(United Kingdom) Roger Becker (2)	(West Germany) Günther Sanders	6-3, 6-4.
1962	(Australia) Martin Mulligan	(Australia) Warren Jacques	6-4, 6-4.
1963	(United Kingdom) Mark Cox	(United Kingdom) Harry Matheson	6-3, 7-5.
1964	(United Kingdom) Mark Cox	(United Kingdom) Clay Iles	7-5, 6-2.
1965	(United Kingdom) Bobby Wilson (4)	(United Kingdom) Gerald Battrick	6-3, 7-5.
1966	(United Kingdom) Graham Stilwell	(United Kingdom) Stanley Matthews	2-6, 6-3, 6-3.
1967	(United Kingdom) Gerald Battrick	(Canada) Mike Carpenter	7-5, 6-4.
1968	(United Kingdom) Bobby Wilson (5)	(United Kingdom) Peter Curtis	6-3, 6-0.
↓ Open era ↓
1969	(United Kingdom) Bobby Wilson (6)	(United Kingdom) Keith Wooldridge	6-3, 6-1.
1970	(Australia) Allan McDonald	(United Kingdom) Keith Wooldridge	6-3, 9-7.
Bio-Strath Cumberland Hard Court Championships
1971	(Australia) Ian Fletcher	(United Kingdom) Alan Mills	7-5, 6-0.
↓ ILTF Independent Tour ↓
Cumberland Club Hard Court Championships
1972	(United Kingdom) David Lloyd	(United Kingdom) John de Mendoza	6-0, 9-7.
1973	(United Kingdom) Buster Mottram	(Australia) Syd Ball	6-2, 6-1.
1974	(Australia) Keith Hancock	(United Kingdom) Richard Lewis	6-3, 6-4.
1975	(United Kingdom) Robin Drysdale	(Australia) Alvin Gardiner	6-7, 6-2, 6-4.
1977	(United Kingdom) David Lloyd (2)	(United Kingdom) Chris Bradnam	7-6, 6-4.
1978	(United Kingdom) Chris Bradnam	(United Kingdom) Michael Appleton	6-1, 6-3.
1979	(United Kingdom) Chris Bradnam (2)	(United Kingdom) Rohun Beven	6-3, 6-4.
1980	(United Kingdom) Rohun Beven	(United Kingdom) Willie Davies	6-1, 6-2.
British Homes Store Cumberland Club Tournament
1981	(United Kingdom) Mark Cox (2)	(United Kingdom) Chris Bradnam	7-6, 6-4.
1982	(Bermuda) Stephen Alger	(South Africa) Christo van Rensburg	6-2, 7-6.
1983	(United Kingdom) John Feaver	(United Kingdom) Chris Bradnam	4-6, 7-6, 7-5.

=== Women's singles ===
(incomplete roll)

Year	Winners	Runners-up	Score
Cumberland Hard Court Championships
↓ ILTF Circuit ↓
1927	(United Kingdom) Christabel Hardie	(United Kingdom) Elsie Goldsack	6-4, 4-6, 6-2
1928	(United Kingdom) Violet Chamberlain	(United Kingdom) Christabel Hardie	6-2, 6-1
1929	(United Kingdom) Joan Ridley	(United Kingdom) Betty Dix	6-2, 6-2
1930	(United Kingdom) Elsie Goldsack Pittman	(United Kingdom) Joan Ridley	3-6, 6-3, 6-3
1931	(United Kingdom) Davina Gordon Townsend	(United Kingdom) Freda Scott	3-6, 6-1, 6-2
1932	(United Kingdom) Mrs H. Martin	(United Kingdom) N. Case	6-4, 6-2
1933	(United Kingdom) Jeanette Morfey	(United Kingdom) Jean Saunders	divided title
1934	(United Kingdom) Christabel Hardie Wheatcroft (2)	(United Kingdom) Mary Burgess-Smith	4-6, 8-6, 8-6
1935	(United Kingdom) Joan Ingram	(United Kingdom) Christabel Hardie Wheatcroft	6-1, 6-3
1936	(United Kingdom) Mary Heeley	(United Kingdom) Sheila Paterson	6-1, 6-1
1937	(United Kingdom) Mary Heeley (2)	(United Kingdom) Nina Brown	6-1, 6-0
1938	(United Kingdom) Mary Hardwick	(United Kingdom) Betty Batt	8-6, 6-2
1939/1946	Not held (due to World War II)		
1946	(United Kingdom) Joan Curry	(United Kingdom) Betty Clements Hilton	7-5, 6-4
1947	(United Kingdom) Joan Curry (2)	(United Kingdom) Peggy Dawson-Scott	6-3, 6-2
1948	(United Kingdom) Joan Curry (3)	(United Kingdom) Molly Lincoln Blair	6-2, 6-4
1949	(United Kingdom) Jean Quertier	(United Kingdom) Jean Walker-Smith	6-4, 6-1
1950	(United Kingdom) Patsy Rodgers	(United Kingdom) Joey Physick David	6-4, 6-0
1951	(Australia) Nancye Wynne Bolton	(United Kingdom) Susan Partridge	4-6, 6-2, 6-4
1952	(United Kingdom) Gem Hoahing	(United Kingdom) Georgie Woodgate	2-6, 6-4, 6-3
1953	(United Kingdom) Angela Mortimer	(United Kingdom) Gem Hoahing	6-3, 6-1
1954	(United Kingdom) Angela Buxton	(United Kingdom) Lorna Cawthorn	6-4, 6-0
1955	(United Kingdom) Pearl Gannon Panton	(United Kingdom) Jenny Middleton	5-7, 6-2, 6-0
1956	(United Kingdom) Angela Buxton (2)	(United Kingdom) Sue Waters	6-0, 6-4
1957	(United Kingdom) Christine Truman	(United Kingdom) Sheila Armstrong	4-6, 6-1, 8-6
1958	(United Kingdom) Christine Truman (2)	(United Kingdom) Sheila Armstrong	6-3, 5-7, 6-3
1959	(United Kingdom) Shirley Bloomer	(New Zealand) Ruia Morrison	6-2, 6-4
1960	(United Kingdom) Christine Truman (3)	(United Kingdom) Shirley Bloomer Brasher	6-4, 6-2
1961	(United Kingdom) Pauline Titchener Roberts	(United States) Rosemary Deloford	6-4, 6-2
1962	(United Kingdom) Ann Haydon	(United Kingdom) Lorna Cawthorn	6-2, 6-1
1963	(United Kingdom) Christine Truman (4)	(Australia) Robin Lesh	7-5, 6-8, 6-4
1964	(Australia) Jan Lehane	(United Kingdom) Ann Haydon Jones	6-3, 2-6, 6-4
1965	(United Kingdom) Ann Haydon Jones (2)	(United Kingdom) Christine Truman	4-6, 6-3, 10-8
1966	(United Kingdom) Ann Haydon Jones (3)	(United Kingdom) Elizabeth Starkie	6-2, 6-2
1967	(United Kingdom) Christine Truman (5)	(Czechoslovakia) Jitka Volavková	7-5, 6-1
1968	(Australia) Faye Toyne-Moore	(United Kingdom) Christine Truman Janes	6-4, 6-2
↓ Open era ↓
1969	(United Kingdom) Joyce Barclay Williams	(United Kingdom) Winnie Shaw	7-5, 6-2
1970	(Australia) Evonne Goolagong	(United Kingdom) Jill Cooper	6-2, 9-7
Bio-Strath Cumberland Hard Court Championships
1971	(United Kingdom) Christine Truman Janes (6)	(United Kingdom) Jill Cooper	8-6, 4-6, 6-2
↓ ILTF Independent Tour ↓
Cumberland Club Hard Court Championships
1972	(United Kingdom) Glynis Coles	(United States) Patti Hogan	8-6, 6-4
1973	(United Kingdom) Linda Mottram	(United Kingdom) Veronica Burton	7-5, 2-6, 6-2
1974	(United Kingdom) Veronica Burton	(Israel) Paulina Peisachov	4-6, 9-8, 6-2
1975	(United Kingdom) Linda Mottram (2)	(United Kingdom) Glynis Coles	7-6, 7-5
1977	(United Kingdom) Linda Mottram (3)	(United Kingdom) Jackie Fayter	6-2, 5-7, 6-4
1978	(United Kingdom) Linda Mottram (4)	(United Kingdom) Jackie Fayter	6-3, 6-7, 6-2
1979	(United Kingdom) Jo Durie	(United Kingdom) Linda Mottram	6-4, 6-1
1980	(United Kingdom) Jo Durie (2)	(United Kingdom) Anne Hobbs	6-4, 7-6
British Homes Store Cumberland Club Tournament
1981	(United Kingdom) Jo Durie (3)	(United Kingdom) Debbie Jevans	6-3, 6-4
1982	(United Kingdom) Kate Brasher	(Japan) Masako Yanagi	6-1, 6-1
1983	(United Kingdom) Amanda Brown	(United Kingdom) Debbie Jevans Jarrett	6-2, 4-6, 6-3
1985	(South Africa) Elna Reinach	(United States) Nancy Cohen	7-5, 7-5
1986	(Sweden) Catrin Jexell	(United Kingdom) Jane Wood	6-4, 6-2
