= Alassio International =

Alassio International Internazionale di Alassio

Defunct tennis tournament
- Founded: 1925; 101 years ago
- Abolished: 1940; 86 years ago
- Location: Alassio, Liguria, Northern Italy
- Venue: Hanbury Tennis Club
- Surface: Clay

The Alassio International or Internazionale di Alassio was a combined men's and women's clay court tennis tournament founded in 1925 at Alassio, Liguria, Northern Italy. The tournament was staged at the Hanbury Tennis Club (f.1923) until 1940, and was part of the Italian Riviera circuit of tennis tournaments.

== History ==
In 1923 Daniel Hanbury founded the "Hanbury Tennis Club" with a historic Club House, opened by the great tennis player Henry Lacoste. The Alassio International tennis tournament was a combined men's and women's clay court tennis tournament founded in 1925 at Savona, Liguria, Northern Italy. The tournament was staged until 1940.

This tournament held two versions of the event the most important being the spring edition usually held in April, and a second but brief Alassio International Summer Tournament held a few times in the early 1930s. The tournament was staged until 1940 when it ended due to World War II.

Former winners of the men's singles included; Placido Gaslini (1925), Jacques Brugnon (1929), Pat Hughes (1930), Béla von Kehrling (1932), Giovanni Palmieri (1933–1936), Vojtěch Vodička (1937) and Francesco Romanoni (1940). The women's single was previously won by Dorothy Holman (1925), Lucia Valerio (1928, 1930), Dorothy Andrus (1932), Cilly Aussem (1934) and Gracyn Wheeler (1939).

== Venue ==
The Alassio International was held at the Hanbury Tennis Club (f.1923) by Daniel Hanbury. It encompasses twelve thousand square meters of greenery surrounding the 7 tennis courts, the elegant colonial-style club house.

== Finals ==
=== Men's singles ===
(* denotes spring edition ** denotes summer edition)

Year	Winner	Runner-up	Score
1925	(Italy) Placido Gaslini	(Italy) Roberto Bocciardo	6–3, 2–6, 6–1, 6–2
1926	(United Kingdom) W. Cumming	(United Kingdom) Daniel Hanbury	6–4, 7–5, 6–3
1927	(United Kingdom) J. Davidson	(United Kingdom) Mr. Jonides	6–3, 7–5, 6–1
1928 *	(Switzerland) Mr. du Peloux	(Italy) Mario Sertorio	6–3, 7–9, 6–1, 4–6, 6–4
1928 **	(Italy) Placido Gaslini (2)	(Italy) Roberto Bocciardo	6–1, 6–3, 7–9, 6–1, 4–6, 6–4
1929	(France) Jacques Brugnon	(United Kingdom) Pat Hughes	6–3, 6–4, 6–1
1930	(United Kingdom) Pat Hughes	(India) Hira-Lal Soni	6–1, 6–2, 6–2
1931	(Italy) Roberto Bocciardo	(United Kingdom) George William Grounsell	7–5, 2–6, 3–6, 6–1
1932	(Hungary) Bela Von Kehrling	(Republic of Ireland) George Lyttleton Rogers	6–2, 6–1, 6–2
1933 *	(United Kingdom) Jimmy Jones	(Italy) Ferruccio Quintavalle	6–2, 6–4, 6–2
1933 **	(Italy) Giovanni Palmieri	(Italy) Giuseppe Bacigalupo	6–1, 6–4, 8–6
1934 *	(Italy) Giovanni Palmieri (2)	(Italy) Emanuele Sertorio	6–4, 6–0, 6–2
1934 **	(Italy) Placido Gaslini (3)	(Italy) Roberto Bocciardo	6–3, 2–6, 6–1, 6–2
1935	(Italy) Giovanni Palmieri (3)	(Italy) Augusto Rado	4–6, 6–0, 6–1, 6–0
1936	(Italy) Giovanni Palmieri (4)	(Germany) Kay Lund	6–3, 6–3, 6–1
1937	(Czechoslovakia) Vojtěch Vodička	(Czechoslovakia) E. Ambros	6–3, 6–3, 11–9
1938	(Hungary) Emil Gabori	(Switzerland) Boris Maneff	6–8, 6–4, 6–1, 6–8, 6–1
1939	(Italy) Gianni Cucelli	(Socialist Federal Republic of Yugoslavia) Franjo Punčec	8–6, 7–5, 6–4
1940	(Italy) Francesco Romanoni	(Socialist Federal Republic of Yugoslavia) Josip Palada	6–0, 6–2, 6–4

=== Women's singles ===
(* denotes spring edition ** denotes summer edition)

Year	Winner	Runner-up	Score
1925	(United Kingdom) Dorothy Holman	(United Kingdom) Coela Pryce-Harrison	6–3, 6–4
1927	(Italy) Ida Quintavalle	(Italy) Carla Isotta	9–7, 6–3
1928	(Italy) Lucia Valerio	(United Kingdom) Claire Beckingham	6–1, 6–3
1929	(United Kingdom) N. Hunt	(Italy) S. de la Prynne	6–4, 3–6, 6–2
1930 *	(Italy) Lucia Valerio (2)	(United Kingdom) Phyllis Satterthwaite	6–1, 6–2
1930 **	(Italy) J. Ionides	(Italy) Miss Bettramine	0–6, 7–5, 9–7
1932	(United States) Dorothy Andrus Burke	(Germany) Ilse Weihermann Friedleben	6–0, 9–7
1933	(United States) Elizabeth Ryan	(Italy) Ucci Manzutto	6–2, 6–0
1934	(Germany) Cilly Aussem	(United States) Elizabeth Ryan	6–3, 6–4
1935	(France) Edith Belliard	(Germany) Cilly Aussem	6–3, 1–6, 6–3
1936	(Czechoslovakia) Minni Hein Muller	(Austria) Trude Wolf	6–1, 7–9, 6–1
1938	(Czechoslovakia) Minni Hein Muller (2)	(Germany) Klara Hammer Beutter	6–4, 5–7, 6–2
1939	(United States) Gracyn Wheeler	(Hungary) Klara Somogyi	6–3, 6–2
1940	(Socialist Federal Republic of Yugoslavia) Hella Kovac	(Socialist Federal Republic of Yugoslavia) Alice Florian	6–2, 7–5
