= Stourbridge Open =

Defunct tennis tournament
- Event name: Stourbridge Lawn Tennis Tournament (1887-1907); Stourbridge Open Lawn Tennis Tournament (1919–59); Stourbridge Open (1969–70); Bio-Strath Stourbridge Open (1971); Stourbridge Open (1972–73); Trophee Pernod Stourbridge (1979-1981)
- Founded: 1887-1907 1919-59 1969-73 1979-81
- Location: Solihull, Midlands, England
- Venue: Stourbridge Lawn Tennis Club
- Surface: Grass; Hard

The Stourbridge Open also known as the Trophee Pernod Stourbridge for sponsorship reasons, was a men's and women's grass court tennis tournament founded in September 1887 as the Stourbridge Lawn Tennis Tournament, and first staged at the Stourbridge Cricket Club (f.1888) grounds, Stourbridge in what was then Worcestershire, but is now part of the West Midlands, England. This tournament has not had a continual history, being established then discontinued on four occasions. The last tournament took place in 1981.

== History ==
The first Stourbridge Lawn Tennis Tournament organised by the Stourbridge Cricket Club was held in September 1887 and ran until 1907. In 1919 a second Stourbridge Open lawn tennis tournament was established by the North Worcestershire Lawn Tennis Club (f.1919), and continued until 1959.

In 1969 the North Worcestershire Lawn Tennis Club and the Stourbridge Old Edwardian Lawn Tennis Club (f.1926) merged to create a new club called the Stourbridge Lawn Tennis and Squash Club. The new club then staged a third Stourbridge tournament called the Stourbridge Open.

In 1971 the tournament was incorporated into the Bio-Strath Circuit under the sponsorship name of the Bio-Strath Stourbridge Open or simply the Bio-Strath Stourbridge, where it was the ninth leg of the circuit that year. The tournament continued until 1974 as part of the ILTF circuit. In 1979 a fourth Stourbridge tournament was revived as an ITF Satellite tournament called the Pernod Trophy Stourbridge, and played at the current Stourbridge Tennis Club until 1991.

== Venues ==
There has been four versions of the Stourbridge Open staged by three different clubs. The first tournament was organised by the Stourbridge Cricket and Lawn Tennis Club. The venue for the second version of the event was the North Worcestershire Lawn Tennis Club (f.1919). The venue for third version was the current Stourbridge Lawn Tennis and Squash Club (f.1969).

== Event names ==
- Stourbridge Lawn Tennis Tournament (1887–1907)
- Stourbridge Open Lawn Tennis Tournament (1919–1959)
- Stourbridge Open (1969–70)
- Bio-Strath Stourbridge Open (1971)
- Stourbridge Open (1972–73)
- Trophee Pernod Stourbridge (1979–1981)
