= London Hard Court Championships =

Defunct tennis tournament
- Event name: Bio-Strath London Hard Court Championships
- Founded: 1919; 107 years ago
- Abolished: 1971; 55 years ago
- Location: Ranelagh Gardens, Fulham, London, England
- Venue: The Hurlingham Club
- Surface: Clay

The London Hard Court Championships, later known as the Bio-Strath London Hard Court Championships for sponsorship reasons, was a clay court tennis event founded in 1919. It was held at the Hurlingham Club Ranelagh Gardens, Fulham, London, England through until 1971, when it failed to find new sponsors for the following season, and the tournament ended.

== History ==
The London Hard Court Championships were first established in September 1919. The winner of first men's singles event was Romanian player Nicolae Mishu who defeated Australia's Stanley Doust. In the first women's singles event a decision was made to divide the title and prize between Madeline Fisher O'Neill and Blanche Colston. In 1970 it was part of the Bio-Strath Circuit of tournaments as the third leg of the tour that year.

On 15 May 1971 after 52 years the final London Hard Court Championships was concluded. The final men's singles event was won by the Chilean player Jaime Fillol who defeated Britain's Gerald Battrick. The final women's singles title was won by Australian Margaret Smith Court who beat France's Françoise Dürr.
