= Cardiff Open =

Tennis tournament in Wales

Defunct tennis tournament
- Tour: ILTF World Circuit (1929–69) men (1929–72) women ILTF Independent Circuit (1970–72) men
- Founded: 1929; 96 years ago
- Abolished: 1972; 53 years ago
- Location: Cardiff, Great Britain
- Venue: Cardiff Lawn Tennis Club
- Surface: Grass / outdoor

The Cardiff Open was a men's and women's grass court tennis tournament was founded in 1929 as the Cardiff LTC Tournament. It played annually through till 1975 when it was discontinued. The tournament was played at the Cardiff Lawn Tennis Club, Cardiff, Great Britain. It played annually through till 1972 when it was discontinued.

== History ==
In 1929 the Cardiff Lawn Tennis Club Tournament was first held. During the 1930s the event became known as the Cardiff Lawn Tennis Tournament, or simply the Cardiff Tournament. Following World War II the event was then known as the Cardiff Open Tennis Championships.

This tournament was sometimes held in conjunction with the Glamorganshire Championships with winners of that tournament awarded joint titles. In 1971 the tournament was part of part of the Bio-Strath Circuit where it was branded as the Bio-Strath Cardiff Open. In 1972 Bio Strath did not renew its sponsorship of the circuit and the Cardiff event was dropped from the larger ILTF Independent Circuit. The tournament however did survive as a local event as late as the 1990s.
