= Christabel Wheatcroft =

British tennis player

- Full name: Christabel Marie Wheatcroft
- Country (sports): GBR
- Born: 16 September 1903 Finchley, London, England
- Died: 15 November 1971 (aged 68) New York City, United States
- Turned pro: 1923 (ILTF tour)
- Retired: 1939

Singles
- Career titles: 16

Grand Slam singles results
- French Open: SF (1928)
- Wimbledon: 4R (1935)

Christabel Marie Wheatcroft (née Hardie; 16 September 1903 – 15 November 1971) also known as Christabel Hardie was a British tennis player then later lawyer. She was a semi-finalist at the 1928 French Championships. She also competed at the Wimbledon Championships between 1925 and 1939 where he best result in singles was reaching the fourth round. She was active from 1923 to 1939 where contested 24 career finals and won 16 singles titles.

== Career ==
Christabel Marie Hardie was born in Finchley, London, England on 16 September 1903 with the birth registered at Barnet, Middlesex. In major tournaments she competed at the Wimbledon Championships fourteen times between 1925 and 1939. Her best result in singles was reaching the fourth round in 1935 where she lost to Hilde Sperling the No2 seed that year in straight sets.

In 1936 she took part in the All England Plate competition consisted of players who were defeated in the first or second rounds of the singles competition at Wimbledon, she reached the quarter finals that year, but was beaten by Florence Ford who eventually won the Wimbledon Plate. At the French Championships she was more successful when she reached the semi-finals in 1928 before losing to Helen Wills. Christabel was a successful player on both clay courts and grass courts, she played on the French Riviera circuit during the 1925, 1927 and 1928 seasons.

Her career singles highlights included winning the Gallery Tournament at Dulwich three times (1925, 1927, 1928), the Hereford Open (1926), Brockenhurst Open (1926), the Cumberland Hard Court Championships (1927), Teignmouth Open two times (1927, 1028), the Finchley Hard Court Tournament (1929), the Northern Championships at Liverpool (1932), the Sheffield and Hallamshire Championships (1932), the Wolverhampton Open (1935, 1936), the New Malden Clay Courts (1935) and the Lakeland Open two times (1936, 1937).

In addition she was also a losing finalist at the Brockenhurst Open (1924), the Kent County Championships at Blackheath (1928), the Hampstead Hard Court Tournament (1928, 1929), the Carlton Club International (1927), the Welsh Championships (1933), the Paddington Hard Court Tournament (1934) and the Priory Whitsun Lawn Tennis Tournament at Edgbaston (1935).

== Family ==
She married Irving Horace Wheatcroft in Finchley, London in the September 1930.
