= Tally-Ho! Open Tennis Championships =

Defunct tennis tournament
- Event name: Bio Strath Tally Ho! Hard Courts (1970-1971)
- Tour: ILTF (1913-69); Bio-Strath Circuit (1970-71); ILTF (1972-77)
- Founded: 1923; 103 years ago
- Abolished: 1982; 44 years ago
- Location: Edgbaston, Birmingham, England
- Venue: Tally Ho Lawn Tennis Club
- Surface: Clay- outdoors

The Tally-Ho! Open Tennis Championships also known as the Tally-Ho! Hard Courts, was a combined men's and women's clay court tennis tournament originally founded in 1923. The tournament was held at the Tally Ho Lawn Tennis Club, Edgbaston, Birmingham, England until 1982.

== History ==
The Tally-Ho! Open Tennis Championships were established in 1923. The tournament was staged at the Tally Ho Lawn Tennis Club, continuously until 1939 just before the start of World War II. The tournament resumed in 1947. In 1970 the company Bio-Strath AG a food supplements producer took over sponsorship of the event and it was called the Bio Strath Tally Ho! Hard Courts until 1974. The championships continued until 1982 when it was abolished.

Notable winners of the men's singles title included; Jacques Brugnon, Ryuki Miki, Fred Perry,Czeslaw Spychala, Kho Sin-Khie, Jaroslav Drobny, Tony Mottram, Kim Warwick and Jeremy Bates. Winners of the women's singles championship included; Gwen Sterry, Phoebe Holcroft Watson, Dorothy Round, Anita Lizana, Angela Mortimer, Anne Haydon and Corinne Molesworth.
