= Worcestershire Championships =

Defunct tennis tournament
- Tour: ILTF (1913-1969); Bio-Strath Circuit (1970-1971)
- Founded: 1908; 117 years ago
- Abolished: 1974; 51 years ago
- Location: Malvern, Worcestershire, England
- Venue: Manor Park Malvern Sports Club
- Surface: Grass

The Worcestershire Championships also known as the Worcestershire County Lawn Tennis Championships or the Worcestershire Grass Court Championships was a combined men's and women's grass court tournament originally founded in 1908. It was held Malvern, Worcestershire, England until 1974

== History ==
The Worcestershire County Lawn Tennis Championships were established in 1908. The tournament was staged continuously until 1915 just after the start of World War I. The tournament resumed in 1919 until 1939 when it ceased for six years until after World War II. It resumed in 1946 and continued for another 28 years until 1974 when it was abolished.

Previous winners of the men's singles title included; Roy Allen, Ryuki Miki, Isaías Pimentel, Anand Amritraj, Frew McMillan and Patricio Rodríguez. Winners of the women's singles championship included; Ethel Thomson Larcombe, Phoebe Holcroft Watson, Dorothy Round, Erika Vollmer, Angela Mortimer, Anne Haydon and Jenny Dimond.

== Venue ==
Manor Park is a member-run sports club located Malvern, Worcestershire, Great Britain that was founded in 1907. The Manor Park Club's tennis facilities today include 14 outdoor courts consisting of 4 synthetic grass courts with floodlights, 4 acrylic hard courts, 2 with floodlights, 2 artificial clay courts with floodlights and 4 original grass courts for summer play. Indoor facilities include 3 acrylic indoor tennis courts.
