= Torneo Circolo Canottieri Roma =

Torneo Circolo Canottieri Roma Rowing Club Rome Tournament

Defunct tennis tournament
- Tour: ILTF Circuit (1920-1939)
- Founded: 1920; 105 years ago
- Abolished: 1939; 86 years ago
- Location: Rome, Italy
- Venue: Circolo Canottieri Roma
- Surface: Clay

The Torneo Circolo Canottieri Roma or Rowing Club Rome Tournament or simply R.C. Canottieri Roma was a men's international clay court tennis tournament founded in 1920. The tournament was held annually until 1939 when it was discontinued as part of the worldwide ILTF Circuit due to World War II.

== History ==
In 1919 the Rome Rowing Club was founded as the "Club Nautico Romano" by Englishman John Jackson and his Italian friend Luigi D'Eramo. The club is located along the Lungotevere Flaminio in Rome, Italy. In 1920 the club established the Rowing Club Rome Tournament or Torneo Circolo Canottieri Roma.

The event was held annually until 1939 when it was discontinued as part of the worldwide ILTF Circuit due to World War II. Following the second world war the venue reopened in 1947 when it built a new clay court. The club still operates to this day.

Previous winners of the men's singles event include; Jacques Brugnon, Jack Crawford, Giorgio de Stefani, Giovanni Palmieri, Roderich Menzel, Francesco Romanoni and Kho Sin-Khie.

== Finals ==
=== Men's singles ===
(Incomplete roll include:)

Year	Winner	Runner-up	Score
1924	(France) Jacques Brugnon	(Finland) Arne Grahn	6-4, 6–2, 6-1
1926	(Australia) Jack Crawford	(Czechoslovakia) Jan Koželuh	6-2, 3–6, 6–2, 6-3
1930	(Italy) Giorgio de Stefani	(Italy) Alberto del Bono	6-2, 6–3, 6-2
1931	(Italy) Giorgio de Stefani (2)	(Republic of Ireland) George Lyttleton Rogers	4-6, 8–6, 7–5, 6-2
1932	(Italy) Giorgio de Stefani (3)	(Italy) Giovanni Palmieri	6-3, 3–6, 2–6, 7–5, 6-4
1933	(Italy) Giovanni Palmieri	(Italy) Augusto Rado	6-3, 6–1, 6-2
1934	(Czechoslovakia) Roderich Menzel	(Italy) Giovanni Palmieri	6-3, 6–0, 6-2
1937	(Italy) Giovanni Palmieri (2)	(Italy) Giorgio de Stefani	5-7, 6-2 3–6, 6–3, 6-2
1938	(Italy) Francesco Romanoni	(Switzerland) Boris Maneff	6-3, 3–6, 6–2, 1–6, 6-2
1939	(Republic of China (1912–1949)) Kho Sin-Kie	(Romania) Constantin Tănăsescu	3-6, 6–0, 6–2, 6-3
