= Port Washington Tennis Academy =

Sports facility in New York

Coordinates: 40°50′27″N 73°41′38″W

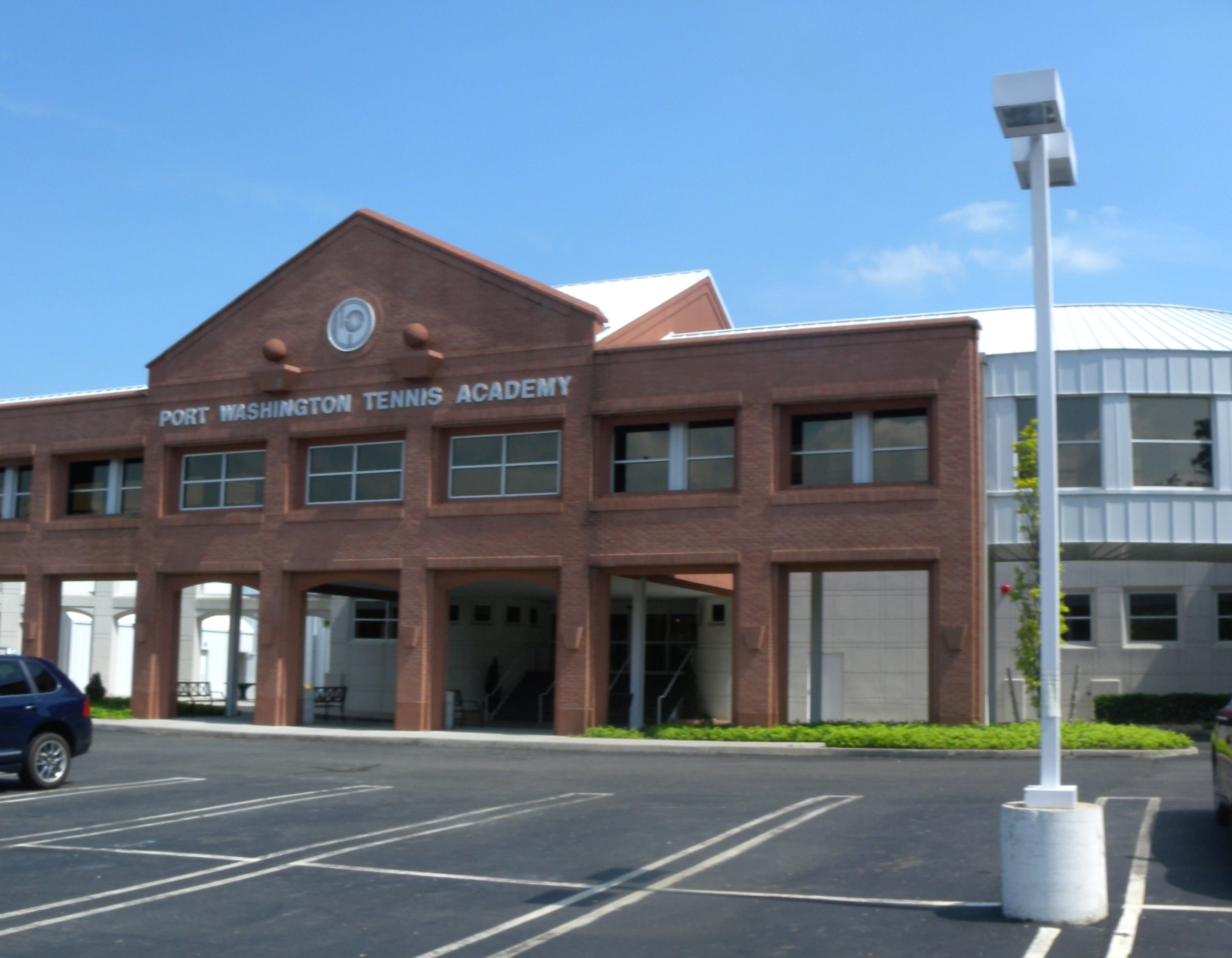
- The Port Washington Tennis Academy
- Interactive map of Port Washington Tennis Academy
- Address: 100 Harbor Road; Port Washington, New York; United States
- Type: Tennis

Construction
- Opened: 1966

Website
- www.sportimeny.com/pw

The Port Washington Tennis Academy (also known as the John McEnroe Port Washington Tennis Academy or simply PWTA) is a tennis venue located in Port Washington, in Nassau County, New York, United States.

== Description ==
The John McEnroe Tennis Academy was founded in 1966 as a non-profit tennis facility, known at the time by its original name, the Port Washington Tennis Academy. John McEnroe (under coaches Tony Palafox and Stanley Matthews) and Vitas Gerulaitis developed their games here, and Australian coach Harry Hopman worked at the facility late in his life.

== See also ==
- Louis Armstrong Stadium
- Arthur Ashe Stadium
