= Brockenhurst Open =

Defunct tennis tournament
- Tour: ILTF Circuit (1913-1939)
- Founded: 1914; 111 years ago
- Abolished: 1939; 86 years ago
- Location: Brockenhurst, Hampshire, England
- Venue: New Forest Lawn Tennis and Croquet Club
- Surface: Grass - outdoors

The Brockenhurst Open was a men's and women's grass court tennis tournament founded in 1914. The event also known as the New Forest Open was organised by the New Forest Lawn Tennis and Croquet Club and played at the Brockenhurst Park Estate and House until 1939 when it was discontinued due to World War II.

== History ==
Brockenhurst Park Estate and House was purchased in 1769 by Edward Morant. The house was renamed Morant Hall (also known as Brockenhurt Manor) which remained with the Morant family until the estate was sold in the late 1950s. In 1914 the New Forest Lawn Tennis and Croquet Club staged its first tennis week of events known as the Brockenhurst Lawn Tennis Week. In 1915 World War I started and the tournament was suspended until 1921 when it was revived. The tournament ran annually until 1939 when it was discontinued due to World War II.

== Finals ==
=== Men's singles ===
(incomplete roll)

Year	Winners	Runners-up	Score
1922	(United Kingdom) Walter Crawley	(India) Ullah Kramet	6–2, 9–7, 6–3.
1923	(United Kingdom) Walter Crawley (2)	(United Kingdom) Brame Hillyard	6–4, 5–7, 6–2, 8–6.
1928	(Canada) Henry Mayes	(Republic of Ireland) Cornelius H. D. O'Callaghan	6–3, 4–6, 6–1, 6–3.
1931	(United Kingdom) R.V. Jenkins	(United Kingdom) Theodore Mavrogordato	6–1, 6–1.
1932	(United Kingdom) Edward Alfred Dearman	(Republic of Ireland) Noel Galway Holmes	6–1, 6–3.
1933	(Australia) Jack Crawford	(Australia) Vivian McGrath	0–6, 6–0, 7–5.
1934	(United Kingdom) Guy Cooper	(United Kingdom) Edward Alfred Dearman	6–4, 7–5.
1935	(United Kingdom) Eric Peters	(Austria) Richard Arnold Von Planner	6–4, 6–4.
1936	(United Kingdom) Guy Cooper	(United Kingdom) Edward Alfred Dearman	7–5, 6–1.
1937	(South Africa) Vernon Kirby	(United Kingdom) Eric Peters	w.o.
1938	(United Kingdom) Eric Peters	(United Kingdom) Alan Brown	6–3, 7–5.
1939	(United Kingdom) George Edward Godsell	(United Kingdom) Harold Hare	6–3, 6–1.
1940/1945	Not held (due to World War II then discontinued)		

=== Women's singles ===
Year	Winners	Runners-up	Score
1914	(United Kingdom) Violet Pinckney	(United Kingdom) Marguerite Sudgen Pearce	6–2, 6–3
1915/1920	Not held (due to World War I)		
1921	(United Kingdom) Violet Pinckney (2)	Blanche Duddell Colston	4–6, 6–4, retd.
1922	(United Kingdom) Kitty Mckane	(United Kingdom) Dorothy Holman	6–2, 6–2
1923	(United Kingdom) Dorothy Holman	(United Kingdom) Camilla Rimington	6–1, 6–4
1924	(United Kingdom) Dorothy Holman (2)	(United Kingdom) Christabel Hardie	3–6, 6–2, 8–6
1925	(United Kingdom) Dorothy Holman (3)	(United Kingdom) Edith Clarke	8–6, 7–5
1926	(United Kingdom) Christabel Hardie	(United Kingdom) Mabel Mavrogordato	6–4, 6–2
1927	(United Kingdom) Joan Ridley	(United Kingdom) Claire Beckingham	9–7, 7–5
1928	(United Kingdom) Margaret McKane Stocks (2)	(United Kingdom) Claire Beckingham	4–6, 10–8, 6–4
1929	(United Kingdom) Violet Chamberlain	(United Kingdom) Mabel Mavrogordato	6–1, 5–0, retd.
1930	(United Kingdom) Elsie Goldsack Pittman	(United Kingdom) Ermyntrude Harvey	8–6, 7–5
1931	(United Kingdom) Evelyn Dearman	(United Kingdom) Nancy Lyle	1–6, 6–3, 6–3
1932	(United Kingdom) Edie Rudd	(United Kingdom) A. Yeates	7–5, 6–4
1933	(United Kingdom) Evelyn Dearman (2)	(United Kingdom) Margaret McKane Stocks	6–4, 6–2
1934	(United Kingdom) Nancy Lyle	(United Kingdom) Evelyn Dearman	6–0, 7–5
1935	(United Kingdom) Effie Hemmant Peters	(United Kingdom) P. Scott	6–4, 6–2
1936	(United Kingdom) Evelyn Dearman (3)	(United Kingdom) Peggy Scriven	6–3, 6–4
1937	(United Kingdom) Nina Brown	(United Kingdom) Effie Peters	divided prizes
1938	(United Kingdom) Evelyn Dearman (4)	(United Kingdom) Margot Stewart	4–6, 6–1, 6–0
1939	(United Kingdom) Nancy Lyle Glover (2)	(United Kingdom) Gay Moorhouse Chandler	6–1, 7–5
1940/1945	Not held (due to World War II then discontinued)		
