= Sheffield and Hallamshire Championships =

Defunct tennis tournament
- Event name: Sheffield and Hallamshire Tournament (1888–1895); Sheffield and Hallamshire Championships (1896–1970); Bio-Strath Sheffield Tournament (1971); Sheffield and Hallamshire Championships (1972–76)
- Tour: ILTF (1913–1969); Bio-Strath Circuit (1971)
- Founded: 1885; 140 years ago
- Abolished: 1976; 49 years ago
- Location: Sheffield, South Yorkshire, England
- Venue: Sheffield and Hallamshire Lawn Tennis Club (f. 1885)
- Surface: Grass

The Sheffield and Hallamshire Championships was an open men's and women's international grass court tennis tournament founded in 1888 as the Sheffield and Hallamshire Tournament. The tournament was played at the Sheffield and Hallamshire Lawn Tennis Club (f. 1885), Sheffield, South Yorkshire, England until 1976 when it was discontinued.

== History ==
The Sheffield and Hallamshire Lawn Tennis Club was founded in November 1885. In 1888 it inaugurated the Sheffield and Hallamshire Tournament played on grass courts in Sheffield, South Yorkshire, England. In 1897 the Sheffield and Hallamshire Tournament was elevated to a county level event and renamed as the Sheffield and Hallamshire Championships. In April 1971 it was added to the new Bio-Strath Circuit of events, and rebranded as the Bio-Strath Sheffield Tournament for that year only.

The winner of the first men's singles champion was British player Mr. G. E. Lowe. The winner of the first women's singles champion was British player Miss. L. Chatterton-Clarke. The final men's singles champion was British player Andrew Jarrett. The final women's singles champion was Australian player Wendy Gilchrist Paish.

== Venue ==
The original Sheffield and Hallamshire Lawn Tennis Club was founded in 1885. In 1887 the club had three gravel courts, then later expanded to include an additional ten grass courts. Today the club is known as the Hallamshire Tennis, Squash & Racketball Club.

== Finals ==
=== Men's Singles ===
Incomplete Roll:

Year	Champions	Runners-up	Score
Sheffield and Hallamshire Tournament
1888	(United Kingdom) G.E. Lowe	(United Kingdom) Henry Guy Nadin	6–2, 6–1, 2–6, 6–0
1889	(United Kingdom) David Davy	(United Kingdom) Frederick T. Bradbury	7–9, 3–6, 6–1, 6–1, 6–3
1890	(United Kingdom) Kenneth Sanderson	(United Kingdom) Charles william Wade	6–4, 3–6, 2–6, 6–2, 7–5
1891	(United Kingdom) Herbert Wilberforce	(United Kingdom) Tancred Disaeli Cummins	6–2, 6–4, 6–4
1892	(Australia) Arthur Benjamin Carvosso	(United Kingdom) Tancred Disaeli Cummins	8–6, 8–6, 6–1
1893	(Ireland) Joshua Pim	(United Kingdom) Wilfred Baddeley	6–0, 6–4, 6–1
1894	(United Kingdom) Roy Allen	(United Kingdom) Charles Gladstone Allen	w.o.
1895	(United Kingdom) Roy Allen (2)	(United Kingdom) Reginald Arthur Gamble	6–1, 6-, 6–4
1896	(United Kingdom) Frank Riseley	(United Kingdom) Roy Allen	6–4, 7–5, 6–4
Sheffield and Hallamshire Championships
1903	(United Kingdom) Roy Allen (3)	(United Kingdom) Charles Gladstone Allen	w.o.
1904	(United Kingdom) Roy Allen (4)	(United Kingdom) Frederick William Payn	6–3, 6–8, 6–3, 7–5
1905	(United Kingdom) Roy Allen (5)	(United Kingdom) Arthur Gore	6–4, 6–4, 6–2
1906	(New Zealand) Anthony Wilding	(United Kingdom) Ernest Watson	6–1, 6–0, 6–1
1907	(New Zealand) Anthony Wilding (2)	(United Kingdom) Reginald Webster	6–0, 6–4, 6–1
1908	(New Zealand) Anthony Wilding (3)	(United Kingdom) Roy Allen	6–0, 6–4
1909	(United Kingdom) Roy Allen (6)	(United Kingdom) Sidney Watson	6–2, 6–2, 6–2
1910	(United Kingdom) Mark Day Hick	(United Kingdom) Roy Allen	w.o.
1914/1919	Not held (due to World War I)		
1920	(Japan) Zenzo Shimidzu	(United Kingdom) Randolph Lycett	4–6, 6–2, 6–2, 4–6, 7–5
1922	(United Kingdom) Brame Hillyard	(United Kingdom) M Pentland	6–1, 8–6, 4–6, 4–6, 6–3
1930	(India) Atri Madan Mohan	(United Kingdom) Harry Scriven Burrows	3–6, 6–1, 6–0
1931	(Japan) Jiro Satoh	(Japan) Ryuki Miki	divided the title.
1932	(Japan) Jiro Satoh (2)	(Japan) Takeo Kuwabara	6–4, 6–1
1933	(Australia) Don Turnbull	(Australia) Adrian Quist	6–8, 10–12, 6–2, 6–4, 6–4
1934	(Japan) Ryuki Miki	(New Zealand) Cam Malfroy	5–7, 7–5, 6–2
1935	(New Zealand) Alan Stedman	(New Zealand) Cam Malfroy	11–13, 7–5, 6–2
1936	(New Zealand) Cam Malfroy	(New Zealand) Alan Steadman	6–0, 1–6, 6–2
1937	(United Kingdom) Colin N. O, Ritchie	(United Kingdom) Jack Lysaght	5–7, 14–12, 7–5
1938	(India) Ghaus Mohammed Khan	(New Zealand) Cam Malfroy	5–7, 6–3, 6–1
1939	(Romania) Constantin Tănăsescu	(Republic of China (1912–1949)) Jin H. Ho	3–0, ret.
1940/1945	Not held (due to World War II)		
1949	(United Kingdom) Arthur Reader	(Malaysia) Ong, Chew-Bee	6–1, 6–3, 6–2
1950	(United Kingdom) Arthur Reader	(Poland) Czesław Spychała	7–5, 6–3
1954	(Australia) Peter Cawthorn	(Brazil) Ivo Ribeiro	6–4, 6–3, 2–6, 2–6, 6–4
Open Era
1970	(West Germany) Hans Joachim Plötz	(Australia) Dick Crealy	6–2, 6–2, 6–4
Bio-Strath Sheffield Tournament
1971	(Australia) Kim Warwick	(France) Pierre Joly	6–4, 4–6, 6–4
Sheffield and Hallamshire Championships
1974	(United Kingdom) Bobby Wilson	(United Kingdom) John Clifton	7–5, 6–3
1975	(United Kingdom) Bobby Wilson (2)	(Australia) Peter Campbell	6–3, 6–4
1976	(United Kingdom) Andrew Jarrett	(United Kingdom) Stephen Warboys	6–4, 7–5

=== Women's Singles ===
Incomplete Roll:

Year	Champions	Runners-up	Score
Sheffield and Hallamshire Tournament
1888	(United Kingdom) L. Chatterton-Clarke	(United Kingdom) M. Crossley	6–1, 6–2
1889	(United Kingdom) M. Crossley	(United Kingdom) L. Chatterton-Clarke	6–5, 6–1
1890	(United Kingdom) Beatrice Wood	(United Kingdom) M. Crossley	6–4, 6–2
1891	(United Kingdom) Beatrice Wood (2)	(United Kingdom) Agnes Noon Watts	6–3, 6–3
1892	(United Kingdom) Miss Crosby	(United Kingdom) Miss Kersey	6–2, 6–2
1893	(United Kingdom) M. Shaw	(United Kingdom) Katherine Grey	4–6, 7–5, 7–5
1894	(United Kingdom) Jane Corder	(United Kingdom) Florence Noon Thompson	6–1, 6–3
1895	(United Kingdom) Ruth Dyas	(United Kingdom) Gertrude Provis	7–5, 6–3
1896	(United Kingdom) Gertrude Provis	(United Kingdom) Beatrice Wood Draffen	6–4, 6–4
Sheffield and Hallamshire Championships
1897	(United Kingdom) Ruth Dyas (2)	(United Kingdom) Miss Smyth	5–7, 6–3, 6–3
1898	(United Kingdom) Katherine Grey	(United Kingdom) Miss Black	6–1, 6–2
1899	(United Kingdom) Ruth Dyas Durlacher (3)	(United Kingdom) Ida Cressy	6–2, 6–3
1901	(United Kingdom) N. Morton	(United Kingdom) M. Morton	6–3, 4–6, 6–2
1903	(United Kingdom) Bertha Holder	(United Kingdom) N. Morton	6–4, 5–7, 7–5
1907	(United Kingdom) Bertha Holder (2)	(United Kingdom) Norah Fosdick	1–6, 6–3, 6–0
1908	(United Kingdom) Bertha Holder (3)	(United Kingdom) Katherine Slater Clegg	3–6, 6–3, 6–1
1909	(United Kingdom) Katherine Slater Clegg	(United Kingdom) Bertha Holder	6–4, 5–7, 7–5
1910	(United Kingdom) Katherine Slater Clegg (2)	(United Kingdom) A. Appleyard	6–2, 6–3
1911	(United Kingdom) Katherine Slater Clegg (3)	(United Kingdom) Bertha Holder	2–6, 6–1, 6–4
1912	(United Kingdom) Katherine Slater Clegg (4)	(United Kingdom) Norah Fosdick Middleton	6–4, 6–3
1913	(United Kingdom) Mildred Coles	(United Kingdom) Miss West	4–6, 7–5, 7–5
1914	(United Kingdom) Peggy Dransfield	(United Kingdom) Mrs Howard	6–0, 6–4
1915/1919	Not held (due to World War I)		
1920	(United Kingdom) Peggy Dransfield (2)	(United Kingdom) Kathleen Aitchison	6–3, 7–9, 6–2
1921	(United Kingdom) Elsie Goodlass Holtby	(United Kingdom) Peggy Dransfield	2–6, 12–10, 6–3
1922	(United Kingdom) Peggy Dransfield (3)	(United Kingdom) Mary Holmes	6–3, 6–2
1924	(United Kingdom) Doris Covell	(United Kingdom) Betty Dix	6–1, 6–2
1925	(United Kingdom) Betty Dix	(United Kingdom) Doris Covell Craddock	6–1, 6–0
1926	(United Kingdom) Betty Dix (2)	(United Kingdom) E. Schofield	6–1, 6–0
1927	(United Kingdom) Betty Dix (3)	(United Kingdom) Marjorie Macfarlane	0–6, 6–2, 6–4
1928	(United Kingdom) Hazel Morrison-Smith	(United Kingdom) Mrs G. Hawkins	4–6, 7–5, 6–1
1929	(India) Jenny Sandison	(United Kingdom) Joan Fry	2–6, 6–1, 7–5
1930	(India) Jenny Sandison (2)	(United Kingdom) Christabel Hardie	10–12, 6–1, 6–4
1931	(United Kingdom) Joan Ridley	(United Kingdom) Mrs H. Martin	3–6 6–4 6–1
1932	(United Kingdom) Joan Ingram	(United Kingdom) Christabel Hardie Wheatcroft	6–1, 6–4
1933	(United Kingdom) Christabel Hardie Wheatcroft	(United Kingdom) N. Case	6–2, 6–8, 6–2
1934	(Australia) Joan Hartigan	(Australia) Nell Hopman	1–6, 6–0, 6–4
1935	(Poland) Jadwiga Jędrzejowska	(Chile) Anita Lizana	6–4, 4–6, 6–4
1936	(Germany) Irmgard Rost	(Chile) Anita Lizana	4–6, 10–8, 6–3
1937	(France) Simonne Mathieu	(Germany) Irmgard Rost	6–4, 6–2
1938	(France) Simonne Mathieu (2)	(United Kingdom) Joy Cox	6–3, 6–1
1939	(United Kingdom) Elsie Goldsack Pittman	(Czechoslovakia) Eva Porokova	6–2, 7–5
1940/1945	Not held (due to World War II)		
1950	(United States) Anne Constantine	(United Kingdom) Billie Woodgate	6–4, 7–5
1953	(United Kingdom) Shirley Bloomer	(United Kingdom) Rita Bentley	6–3, 8–6
Open Era
Bio-Strath Sheffield Tournament
1971	(Indonesia) Lita Liem	(Indonesia) Lany Kaligis	6–3, 6–3
Sheffield and Hallamshire Championships
1975	(South Africa) L. Jooste	(Australia) J. Nichol	7–5, 6–4
1976	(Australia) Wendy Gilchrist Paish	(Argentina) Beatriz Villaverde	6–2, 7–6

== Event Names ==
- Sheffield and Hallamshire Tournament (1888–1895)
- Sheffield and Hallamshire Championships (1896–1970)
- Bio-Strath Sheffield Tournament (1971)
- Sheffield and Hallamshire Championships (1972–76)
