= St. Annes Open =

Defunct tennis tournament
- Event name: St. Annes Open (1932-69); Bio-Strath St. Annes Open (1971); St. Annes Open(1972-74)
- Tour: ILTF (1913-70); Bio-Strath Circuit, (1970-71)
- Founded: 1932
- Abolished: 1974
- Location: Lytham St Annes, Lancashire, England
- Venue: St. Anne's Lawn Tennis Club
- Surface: Clay; Grass; Hard

The St. Annes Open also known as the St. Annes on Sea Open was a men's and women's grass court tennis tournament founded as in 1932. It was played at the St. Anne's Lawn Tennis Club, Lytham St Annes, Lancashire, England until the tournament ended in 1974.

== History ==
The St. Annes Open lawn tennis tournament was founded in 1932 and played at the St. Anne's Lawn Tennis Club, Lytham St Annes, Lancashire, England. The women competed for the 'St Annes Trophy'. In 1971 the tournament was incorporated into the Bio-Strath Circuit under the sponsorship name of the Bio-Strath St. Annes Open or simply the Bio-Strath St. Annes, where it was the seventh leg of circuit that year. The tournament ran until 1974 as part of the ILTF tennis circuit then was discontinued.

Former winners of the men's singles title included; Nigel Sharpe (1934), Bob Kirby (1935), John Olliff (1937), Ignacy Tloczyński (1952), Roger Becker (1957), Rudy Hernando (1966), Premjit Lall (1967), and Carlos Kirmayr (1972). Previous winners of the women's singles title has included; Elsie Goldsack Pittman (1935), Rita Bentley (1953), Angela Mortimer (1957), Glenda Swan (1965), Faye Urban (1968), Maria Guzman (1971) and Mandy Morgan (1972).

== Venue ==
St. Annes Lawn Tennis Club was founded in 1925. It staged its first open tournament in 1932. The club still exists today and, currently has nine tennis courts. six are hard courts, three of which are floodlit, and three are all-weather AstroTurf courts which are also floodlit.

== See also ==
- Fylde Tournament (another tennis tournament played at Lytham St Annes held between 1885 and 1914)
