= West Warwickshire Open =

Defunct tennis tournament
- Event name: Bio-Strath West Warwickshire Open (1970–71); Hill Samuel Life Assurance West Warwickshire Open (1980–81)
- Tour: Bio-Strath Circuit, (1970–71)
- Founded: 1970
- Abolished: 1981
- Location: Solihull, Midlands, England
- Venue: West Warwickshire Sports Club
- Surface: Clay; Grass; Hard

The West Warwickshire Open was a tennis tournament also known as the Hill Samuel Life Assurance West Warwickshire Open for sponsorship reasons. It began in 1970 and was staged at the West Warwickshire Sports Club (f.c1888), Solihull, Midlands, England. The tournament ran until 1981 when it was discontinued.

== History ==
The West Warwickshire Open was established in 1970 under the sponsorship name of the Bio-Strath West Warwickshire Open or simply the Bio-Strath West Warwickshire. The tournament was part of the Bio-Strath Circuit until 1971. In 1980 the life insurance company Hill Samuel Life Assurance, a division of Hill Samuel started sponsorship of the event, and it was rebranded as the Hill Samuel Life Assurance West Warwickshire Open. In 1981 when they withdrew sponsorship, and the tournament ended.

== Venue ==
The tournament was staged at the West Warwickshire Sports Club that was founded in 1888. It is located at West Warwickshire Sports Complex Solihull, Midlands, England.
