= Stanley Matthews (disambiguation) =

Sir Stanley Matthews (1915–2000) was an English football player.

Stanley Matthews may also refer to:

- Stanley Matthews (judge) (1824–1889), Associate Justice of the United States Supreme Court
- Stanley Matthews (tennis) (born 1945), English former tennis player, son of the footballer
