= Durham and Cleveland Championships =

Defunct tennis tournament
- Event name: Durham County Association Tournament (1900-02); Durham County Lawn Tennis Championships (1903-46); Durham County Championships (1947-49); Sunderland and Durham Open Championships (1950-70); Bio-Strath Sunderland and Durham (1971); Sunderland and Durham Open Championships (1972-73); Durham and Cleveland Championships (1974-82)
- Tour: ILTF (1913-69); Bio-Strath Circuit (1970); ILTF (1971-82)
- Founded: 1900; 1903 (formal)
- Abolished: 1982
- Location: Sunderland, Tyne and Wear, England
- Venue: Ashbrooke Sports Club
- Surface: Grass

The Durham and Cleveland Championships was a men's and women's grass court tennis tournament founded as in 1900 as the Durham County Association Tournament In 1903 that event became the Durham County Lawn Tennis Championships. It was first played at the Ashbrooke Sports Club Sunderland, Tyne and Wear, England until the tournament ended in 1982.

== History ==
The Durham Association tournament was founded in 1900 and played at Sunderland, County Durham, England, but officially sanctioned as championship event in 1903. The men's event was first known as the Durham County Association Championship Cup. During the 1950s and 1960s the tournament was branded as the Sunderland and Durham Open Championships. In 1971 it was part of the Bio-Strath Circuit that year and was branded as the Bio-Strath Sunderland and Durham tournament for sponsorship reasons. In 1974 following the creation of County Cleveland the tournament was renamed as the Durham and Cleveland Championships until 1982.

Former winners of the men's singles title included; Roy Allen (1900–01, 1906–10), Cecil John Tindell-Green (1920), Josip Palada (1939), Franjo Punčec (1946), Don Butler (1950), Ramanathan Krishnan (1954–55), Freddie Huber (1957) and Billy Knight (1958) and Kim Warwick (1971). Previous winners of the women's singles title has included; Lucy Kendal (1901–02), Helen Aitchison (1904–06, 1908), Ruth Watson (1921–22, 1930, 1932–35) Hella Kovac (1938), Vera Mattar (1948), Billie Woodgate (1951), Ann Haydon (1958), Virginia Wade (1966), and Lesley Charles (1971).

== Location and venue ==
Sunderland, town, port, and metropolitan borough, metropolitan county of Tyne and Wear, historic county of Durham, England. It lies at the mouth of the River Wear, along the North Sea.

The tournament was organised by the Sunderland Lawn Tennis Club officially founded (f.1900), however that club was established as early as 1883 as the tennis section of the Ashbrooke Sports Club (f.1830). The club remains an affiliated club of the Ashbrooke Sports Club (first established in 1830, formally registered in 1887), and the tournament was sanctioned by the County Durham Lawn Tennis Association today known as Durham and Cleveland Lawn Tennis Association (DCLTA). The DCLTA administers tournaments today that cover County Durham, Tees Valley Combined Authority, Sunderland, Gateshead, South Tyneside.

== Event names ==
- Durham County Association Tournament (1900-02)
- Durham County Lawn Tennis Championships (1903-46)
- Durham County Championships (1947-49)
- Sunderland and Durham Open Championships (1950-70)
- Bio-Strath Sunderland and Durham (1971)
- Sunderland and Durham Open Championships (1972-73)
- Durham and Cleveland Championships (1974-82)
