= Angmering-on-Sea Open =

Defunct tennis tournament
- Founded: 1920
- Abolished: 1938
- Location: Angmering, West Sussex, England.
- Venue: Angmering-on-Sea Lawn Tennis Club
- Surface: Grass/Clay

The Angmering-on-Sea Open was a men's and women's international tennis tournament founded in 1920 at Angmering, West Sussex, England that ran until 1938.

== History ==
The Angmering-on-Sea Open was an international tennis tournament founded in 1920 at Angmering, West Sussex, England. The event was held at the first Angmering-on-Sea Lawn Tennis Club. The tournament was mainly played on grass courts except for the 1921 to 1923 editions which were played on clay courts. The tournament ended in 1938 due to the outbreak of World War II the following year.

== Finals ==
=== Men's Singles ===
(incomplete roll) included:

Year	Winner	Runner-up	Score
1920	(United Kingdom) George Stoddart	(United Kingdom) Henry Portlock	8-6, 7-5
1921	(United Kingdom) Major Ritchie	(United Kingdom) Henry Reginald Fussell	6-2, 6-2
1922	(United Kingdom) Gordon Lowe	(United Kingdom) Major Ritchie	6-4, 6–3, 6-2
1923	(United Kingdom) Jack Hillyard	(United Kingdom) Major Ritchie	6-2, 6-3
1924	(United Kingdom) Gordon Crole-Rees	(Switzerland) Hector Cosmo Fisher	3-6, 6–2, 6-2
1925	(United Kingdom) Roy Poland	(United Kingdom) Major Ritchie	6-3, 0–6, 6-3
1926	(United Kingdom) Charles Kingsley	(United Kingdom) Major Ritchie	6-4, 6-4
1927	(United Kingdom) Roy Poland (2)	(United Kingdom) Leslie Allison Godfree	w.o.
1928	(United Kingdom) Ted Avory	(United Kingdom) Roy Poland	6-4, 6-3
1929	(United Kingdom) Roy Poland (3)	(United Kingdom) Kenneth Gandar-Dower	6-2, 9-7
1930	(Japan) Ryuki Miki	(British Raj) Hira-Lal Soni	5-7, 6–1, 6-4
1931	(Japan) Ryuki Miki (2)	(British Raj) Hira-Lal Soni	5-7, 6–1, 6-4
1932	(United Kingdom) Dickie Ritchie	(Japan) Ryuki Miki	6-1, 3–6, 6-2
1932/1935	Event not held		
1936	(United Kingdom) Ronald Shayes	(United Kingdom) Henry Billington	9-7, 0–6, 8-6
1937	(United Kingdom) Henry Billington	(United Kingdom) David H. Williams	6-3, 6-4
1938	(United Kingdom) Henry Billington (2)	(Argentina) Hector Etchart	6-3, 6-4

=== Women's Singles ===
(incomplete roll)

Year	Winner	Runner-up	Score
1920	(United Kingdom) Aurea Edgington	(United Kingdom) Louise Bull	9-7, 6-4
1921	(United States) Elizabeth Ryan	(United Kingdom) Phyllis Satterthwaite	6-2, 6-1
1922	(United States) Elizabeth Ryan (2)	(United Kingdom) Peggy Ingram	6-3, 6-2
1923	(United Kingdom) Phyllis Satterthwaite	(United Kingdom) Ariadne Rodocanachi	6-1, 8-6
1924	(United Kingdom) R. Armstrong	(United Kingdom) Louise Bull	1-6, 6–0, 6-4
1925	(United Kingdom) Phoebe Holcroft Watson	(United Kingdom) Eleanor Rose	6-3, 6-4
1926	(United Kingdom) Phoebe Holcroft Watson (2)	(United Kingdom) Kitty McKane Godfree	6-3, 6-4
1927	(United Kingdom) Phoebe Holcroft Watson (3)	(United Kingdom) Aurea Edgington	6-4, 6-4
1928	(United Kingdom) Margaret McKane Stocks	(United Kingdom) Joyce Brown	6-4, 6-0
1929	(British Raj) Jenny Sandison	(United Kingdom) Dorothy Shaw Jameson	6-1, 6-4
1930	(United Kingdom) Margaret Walsh Mellows	(United Kingdom) Geraldine Beamish	6-3, 6-2
1931	(United Kingdom) Peggy Brazier	(United Kingdom) Helen Ramsey Burr	7-5, 6-2
1932	(United Kingdom) Phyllis Mudford King	(United Kingdom) Louise Bull	6-0, 6-1
1932/1935	Event not held		
1936	(United Kingdom) Valerie Scott	(United Kingdom) Betty Hobson	3-6, 6–4, 10-8
1937	(United Kingdom) Valerie Scott (2)	(United Kingdom) Betty Smith	5-7, 6–3, 6-2
1938	(United Kingdom) Valerie Scott (3)	(United Kingdom) Thelma Jarvis	6-1, 4–6, 6-4
