= Fitz Park =

Public park in Cumbria, England

Coordinates: 54.60353°N 3.13491°W

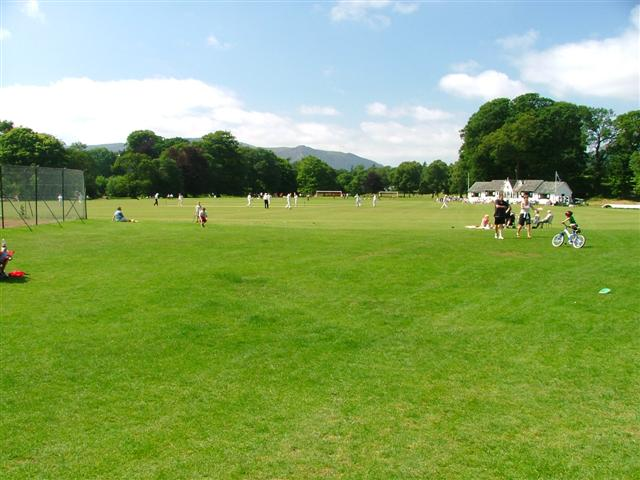

Ground information
- Location: Keswick, Cumberland
- Country: England
- Establishment: 1955 (first recorded match)

Team information
Cumberland	(1955-1966 & 2000-2008)
- As of 19 August 2010; Source: Ground profile

Fitz Park is a public park in Keswick, Cumbria. Landscaped in the Victorian period, the park contains shrubberies and specimen trees, and provides open space for recreation. There are sports grounds for tennis and bowls, and the Keswick Museum and Art Gallery is situated there.

The home ground of Keswick Cricket Club is located in the park.

== Cricket ground ==
The first recorded match on the ground was in 1955, when Cumberland played the Lancashire Second XI in the Minor Counties Championship. Cumberland used the ground from 1955 to 1966 and 2000 to 2008; during this time the ground hosted 10 Minor Counties Championship matches, with the final match held at the ground in that competition being between Cumberland and Northumberland in 2008. During that time the ground has also hosted 2 MCCA Knockout Trophy matches, the last of which came in 2001, when Cumberland played the Northumberland.

The ground has also hosted a single List-A match between Cumberland and the Nottinghamshire Cricket Board in the 1st round of the 2003 Cheltenham & Gloucester Trophy which was played in 2002.

In local domestic cricket, St George's Road is the home ground of Keswick Cricket Club.
