= Jason Young (Australian cricketer) =

Australian cricketer (born 1971)

Personal information
- Full name: Jason Carl Young
- Born: 17 February 1971 (age 55); Wagga Wagga, New South Wales, Australia
- Batting: Right-handed
- Bowling: Right-handed

Domestic team information
- Years: Team
- 1994/95: New South Wales
- Source: ESPNcricinfo, 9 December 2015

Jason Carl Young (born 17 February 1971) is a former Australian cricketer. He was a right-handed batsman. He played two first-class cricket matches for New South Wales duding the 1994–95 season, scoring 64 runs.
