= Mel Baleson =

South African tennis player

- Country (sports): South Africa
- Height: 5 ft 7 in (170 cm)

Singles
- Career record: 6–13

Grand Slam singles results
- French Open: Q3 (1970)
- Wimbledon: Q2 (1969)

Doubles
- Career record: 2–3

Grand Slam doubles results
- Wimbledon: 1R (1970)

Grand Slam mixed doubles results
- Wimbledon: 2R (1968, 1970)

Mel Baleson is a South African former professional tennis player.

A native of Johannesburg, Baleson featured in doubles main draws at Wimbledon and played collegiate tennis for the University of Nevada, Reno. He won the WCAC singles championship as a freshman, then had a sit out his sophomore and junior seasons due to an NCAA rule change, before returning as a senior in 1974.

Baleson and his cousin Glenn Grisillo set a Guinness World Record in 1971 for the longest continuous tennis match, at 73 hours and 25 minutes, to raise funds for the University of Nevada.
