= Ryuki Miki =

Japanese tennis player (1904–1967)

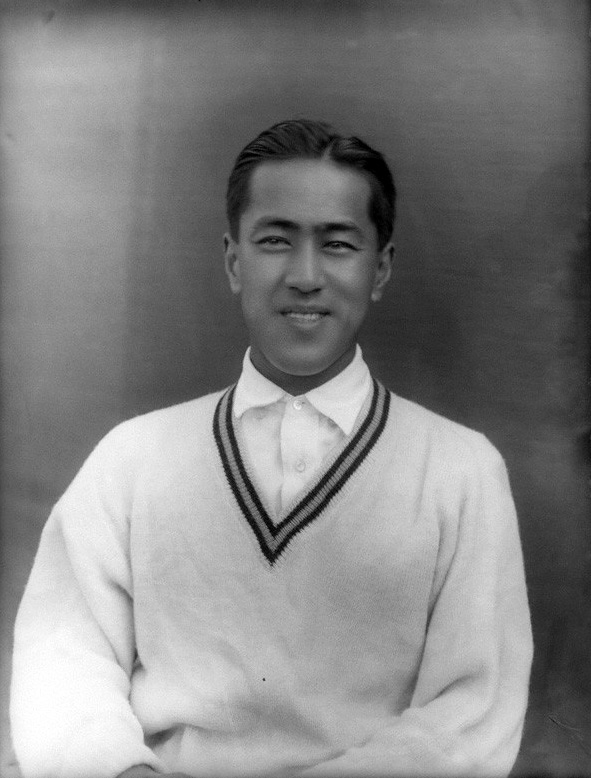
- ITF name: Tatsuyoshi Miki
- Country (sports): Japan
- Born: 11 February 1904 Takamatsu, Kagawa, Japan
- Died: 9 January 1967 (aged 62) Tokyo, Japan

Singles
- Career record: 220-66 (76.9%)
- Career titles: 13

Grand Slam singles results
- French Open: 3R (1933)
- Wimbledon: 3R (1930–1933)
- US Open: 2R (1927)

Grand Slam doubles results
- Wimbledon: QF (1932, 1934)

Grand Slam mixed doubles results
- Wimbledon: W (1933)

Tatsuyoshi 'Ryuki' Miki (三木龍喜, Miki Tatsuyoshi; 11 February 1904 – 9 January 1967) was a Japanese amateur tennis player. His main success was winning the 1934 Wimbledon Championships in mixed doubles (with Dorothy Round).

== Sports career ==
Ryuki Miki was born in Takamatsu. During his studies at the Kobe Higher Commercial School, he played for the collegiate tennis team. There he was approached by Tomiko Ataka, daughter of owner of the trading corporation Ataka and Company. Tomiko asked Miki to be her tennis coach. Miki became an employee at Ataka and Company and at the late 1920s was sent to London. Officially his assignment was to assist the local company representative Kyutaro Izaki, but in fact he was supposed to be a companion and personal assistant to Eiichi Ataka, the heir of the company and talented artist who was taking piano lessons in London, as well as his wife Michiko, another classmate of his.

He played his first tournament at the Japan International Championships in 1924, where he reached his first final before losing to Tsumio Takeshi. While in London, Miki frequently played in amateur tennis tournaments. In 1929 he won his first title at the St.George's Hill Open tournament at Weybridge, Surrey and would win that title a further two times in 1930 and 1931. In 1931 he won the Sheffield and Hallamshire Championships tile. At Wimbledon Championships he played six times in a row, from 1929 to 1934, and four times (1930–1933) ascended there to the third round in singles competition. He also reached quarter-finals twice in 1932 and 1934. In 1932 he and another Japanese player Jiro Sato defeated in the third round second seeded Australians Jack Crawford and Harry Hopman, and in 1934 Miki, pairing with South African Vernon Kirby eliminated in the second round Crawford and Adrian Quist who were fourth-seeded at the time. But Miki's main success was achieved in mixed doubles. With the Briton Dorothy Round whom he was coaching and partnering since 1931 Miki first reached Wimbledon quarter-finals in 1933, and the next year they won the mixed doubles tournament, making Ryuki the first Japanese player in history to win a Grand Slam event. At other British tournaments, Miki was a frequent singles finalist. Among others he won tournaments including the South of England Championships (1930), South Croydon Hard Courts on clay, Angmering-on-Sea Open (1931, 1932), Exmouth Open tournament in (1931), Tally Ho! Open Championships in Birmingham, and the Worcestershire Championships (1931), Midland Counties Championships (1933) and Melbury (1934).

In addition to tournaments on the British soil Ryuki Miki also took part in other competitions in Europe. He played three times at the French Championships, reaching third round in 1933. In 1932 he played for the Japan Davis Cup team in the European zone and won all three his rubbers partnering Jiro Sato, including European semi-final tie in Italy; the Italians eventually won the match 3:2. In February 1934 Tatsuyoshi Miki was appointed the non-playing captain of the Japan Davis Cup team but the death of the team leader Sato left the Japanese without any chances in their first round European tie against the Australians which ended with a bitter 4:1 loss. In 1934 Ryuki Miki won his final title at the Sheffield and Hallamshire Championships against New Zealander Cam Malfroy. He then retired from tennis after 1934, and died in Tokyo.

== Grand Slam finals ==
=== Mixed doubles (1–0) ===
Result	Year	Championship	Surface	Partner	Opponents	Score
Win	1934	Wimbledon	Grass	(United Kingdom) Dorothy Round	(United Kingdom) Dorothy Shepherd-Barron (United Kingdom) Bunny Austin	3–6, 6–4, 6–0
