= Janice Wainwright =

British former squash and tennis player

- Country (sports): United Kingdom
- Born: 11 June 1947 (age 77)

Singles

Grand Slam singles results
- Wimbledon: 2R (1968)

Doubles

Grand Slam doubles results
- Wimbledon: 2R (1967, 1968, 1969, 1971)

Grand Slam mixed doubles results
- Wimbledon: 2R (1969)

Janice Wainwright (born 11 June 1947) is a British former squash and tennis player. She originally competed under her maiden name Janice Townsend, but changed her surname after marrying Mark Wainwright in 1971.

Wainwright, as tennis player, made the singles second round at Wimbledon once in 1968 and won the 1971 All England Plate. She was also an international representative in squash and regularly competed at the British Open.
