= 1969 ILTF Men's Tennis Circuit =

International tennis tournament series

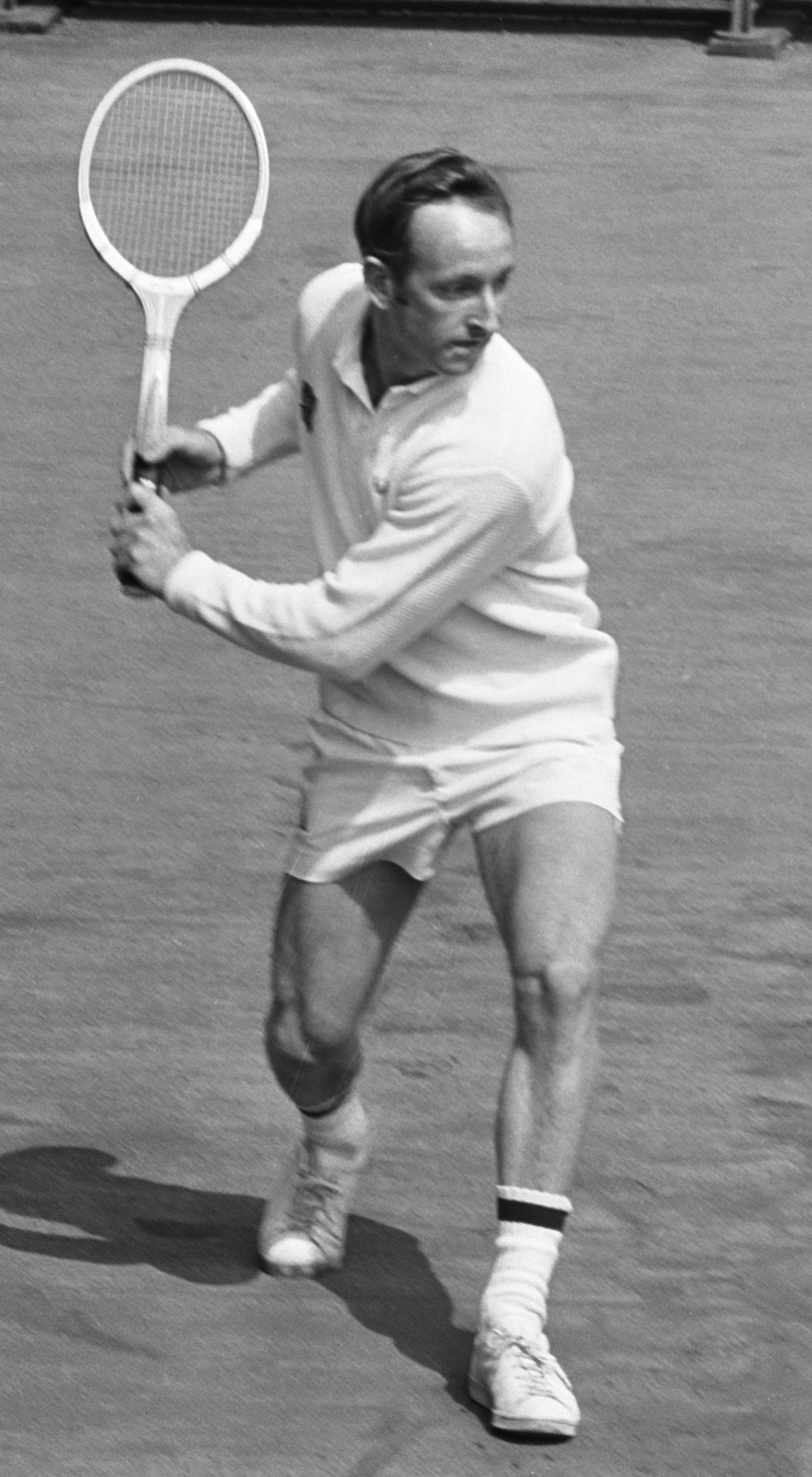
- Australian tennis player Rod Laver at the 1969 Top Tennis Tournament in Amsterdam

Details
- Duration: 31 December 1968 – 29 December 1969
- Edition: 56th
- Tournaments: 141

Achievements (singles)
- Most titles: (Australia) Rod Laver (11)
- Most finals: (Australia) Rod Laver (14)

The 1969 ILTF Men's Tennis Circuit included 141 International Lawn Tennis Federation tournaments that were not affiliated to the NTL Tour or the WCT Circuit. The circuit began on 31 December 1968 in Madras, India and finished on 29 December in New Orleans, United States. It was the 93rd season since the first men's tennis tournaments were staged and 56th season since ILTF was formed.

== Calendar ==
=== Legend ===
Grand Slam tournaments
Professional tournaments
Open tournaments
Amateur tournaments

=== January ===
Date	Tournament	Winner	Finalist	Semifinalist	Quarterfinalist
31 December – 5 January	East India Championships; Madras, India; Singles – Doubles	(Romania) Ilie Năstase; 4–6 6–2 6–3 7–5	(India) Premjit Lall	(Romania) Viorel Marcu (Poland) Mieczysław Rybarczyk	
31 December -5 January	Western Province Championships; Cape Town, South Africa; Singles - Doubles	(South Africa) Bob Hewitt; 6–4 8–6	(South Africa) Robert Maud	(Australia) Bob Carmichael (United Kingdom) Mark Cox	(United Kingdom) Gerald Battrick (West Germany) Jurgen Fassbender (Rhodesia) Andrew Pattison (West Germany) Hans-Jürgen Pohmann
30 Dec	Tasmanian Open Championships; Hobart, Australia; Grass	(Australia) Fred Stolle; 6–3, 0–6, 6–4, 6–1	(Australia) Tony Roche	(Australia) Mal Anderson (United Kingdom) Roger Taylor	(Soviet Union) Toomas Leius (Australia) Ray Ruffels (Australia) Bill Bowrey (Australia) Frank Sedgman
30 Dec	Western Australian Open; Perth, Australia; Grass	(United States) Marty Riessen; 6–3, 6–4, 2–6, 2–6, 6–1	(Australia) Ken Rosewall	(Australia) John Alexander (Australia) Phil Dent	(Australia) Anthony Hammond (Australia) Peter Rigg (Australia) Rob Kilderry (Australia) Phil Holten
4 Jan	North Island Championships; Hamilton, New Zealand; Singles – Doubles	(New Zealand) Brian Fairlie; 6–2 8–6	(New Zealand) Onny Parun	(Rhodesia) Hank Irvine (New Zealand) David B. Hawkes	(Canada) Tony Bardsley
5 Jan	Manly Seaside Championships; Sydney, Australia; Singles – Doubles	(Spain) Manuel Orantes; 6–2 8–6	(Australia) Ray Keldie	(Australia) Bob Giltinan (Australia) Geoff Pollard	(France) Jean-Baptiste Chanfreau (Italy) Vittorio Crotta (Italy) Massimo Di Domenico (Spain) Antonio Muñoz
6–12 January	Orange Free State Championships; Bloemfontein, South Africa; Singles – Doubles	(United Kingdom) Mark Cox; 6–2 7–5	(South Africa) Robert Maud	(South Africa) Frew McMillan (South Africa) John Yuill	(United Kingdom) Gerald Battrick (South Africa) Bob Hewitt (South Africa) Rauty Krog (Rhodesia) Andrew Pattison
31 December-12 January	New Zealand Championships; Wellington, New Zealand; Singles – Doubles	(New Zealand) Brian Fairlie; 6–4 3–6 6–3 6–1	(New Zealand) Onny Parun	(New Zealand) Dave Simmonds (New Zealand) Richard Hawkes	(Canada) Tony Bardsley (New Zealand) Howard Broun (Canada) Peter Burwash (New Zealand) John Lockington
5–12 January	Eastern Province Championships; Port Elizabeth, South Africa; Singles – Doubles	(South Africa) Bob Hewitt; 6–3 8-10 6–4	(United Kingdom) Mark Cox	(Australia) Bob Carmichael (South Africa) Robert Maud	(South Africa) Frew McMillan (West Germany) Hans-Joachim Plötz (South Africa) Terry Ryan (South Africa) Jackie Saul
5-12 January	Indian International Championships; New Delhi, India; Singles – Doubles	(Romania) Ilie Năstase; 6–4 6–2 4–6 6–4	(India) Premjit Lall	(India) Shiv Prakash Misra (United States) Bill Tym	(Sweden) Martin Carlstein (Romania) Sever Dron (India) Shyam Minotra (India) Gaurav Misra
6 Jan	Victorian Open; Melbourne, Australia; Grass	(United States) Stan Smith; 14–12, 6–8, 6–3, 8–6	(United States) Arthur Ashe	(United States) Charlie Pasarell (Australia) Ray Ruffels	(Soviet Union) Toomas Leius (Australia) Bill Bowrey (Australia) Barry Phillips-Moore (United States) Bob Lutz
13-19 January	New South Wales Open; Sydney, Australia; Singles – Doubles	(Australia) Tony Roche; 6–4, 4–6, 9–7, 12–10	(Australia) Rod Laver	(Australia) John Newcombe (Australia) Ken Rosewall	(United Kingdom) Roger Taylor (United States) Pancho Gonzales (Spain) Andrés Gimeno (Australia) Roy Emerson
13-19 January	New South Wales Open; Sydney, Australia; Singles – Doubles	(Australia) Rod Laver (Australia) Roy Emerson; 10–12, 6–4, 6–3	(Australia) Tony Roche (Australia) John Newcombe	(Australia) John Newcombe (Australia) Ken Rosewall	(United Kingdom) Roger Taylor (United States) Pancho Gonzales (Spain) Andrés Gimeno (Australia) Roy Emerson
20-26 January	All India Hard Court Championships; Gauhati, India; Singles – Doubles	(Romania) Ilie Năstase; 4-6 6-2 6-3 7-5	(India) Premjit Lall	(India) Anand Amritraj (Sweden) Martin Carlstein	(Iran) Taghi Akbari (Romania) Sever Dron (Poland) Mieczysław Rybarczyk (United States) Bill Tym
20 Jan	Cotton Bowl Indoor; Dallas, United States; Carpet (i)	(United States) Barry Conway; 6-3 6-0	(United States) Danny Haddox	(United States) Jim Hill (United States) Earl Van Zandt	(United States) Lew Grinnan (United States) Eddie Munson (United States) Larry Turville (United States) Matt Wilson
20-26 January	West German International Covered Court Championships; Cologne, Germany; Singles – Doubles	(Sweden) Ove Nils Bengtson; 6–3 6–3 6–8 6–4	(West Germany) Christian Kuhnke	(France) Jean-Claude Barclay (Czechoslovakia) Jan Kukal	(United Kingdom) Gerald Battrick (Czechoslovakia) Laszlo Kovacs; EgyptIsmail El Shafei (United Kingdom) Bobby Wilson
20-26 January	Austin Smith Championships; Fort Lauderdale, United States; Singles – Doubles	(South Africa) Pat Cramer; 6–2 11–9	(Chile) Jaime Fillol	(United States) Gardnar Mulloy (Ecuador) Eduardo Zuleta	(United States) Frank Froehling III (Ecuador) Pancho Guzmán (United States) Walter Johnson (United States) Harold Solomon
20 Jan	Australian Open; Brisbane, Australia; Grand Slam; Grass; Singles – Doubles – Mixed doubles	(Australia) Rod Laver; 6–3, 6–4, 7–5	(Spain) Andrés Gimeno	(Australia) Tony Roche (Australia) Ray Ruffels	(Australia) Fred Stolle (Australia) John Newcombe (Australia) Bill Bowrey (United States) Butch Buchholz
20 Jan	Australian Open; Brisbane, Australia; Grand Slam; Grass; Singles – Doubles – Mixed doubles	(Australia) Rod Laver (Australia) Roy Emerson; 6–4, 6–4, 6–4	(Australia) Ken Rosewall (Australia) Fred Stolle	(Australia) Tony Roche (Australia) Ray Ruffels	(Australia) Fred Stolle (Australia) John Newcombe (Australia) Bill Bowrey (United States) Butch Buchholz
26 Jan	Omaha International Indoor; Omaha, United States; Hard (i)	(United States) Cliff Richey; 6–4, 6–2	(Mexico) Joaquín Loyo-Mayo	(United Kingdom) Mark Cox (United States) Clark Graebner	(Denmark) Torben Ulrich (United States) Tom Edlefsen (United States) William Brown (United States) Robert McKinley
26 Jan	Omaha International Indoor; Omaha, United States; Hard (i)	(United States) Cliff Richey (United States) Tom Edlefsen; 7–5, 6–3	(United Kingdom) Mark Cox (United States) Jim McManus	(United Kingdom) Mark Cox (United States) Clark Graebner	(Denmark) Torben Ulrich (United States) Tom Edlefsen (United States) William Brown (United States) Robert McKinley

=== February ===
Date	Tournament	Winner	Finalist	Semifinalist	Quarterfinalist
February	Pittsburgh Golf Club Invitation Indoors; Pittsburgh, United States; Singles – Doubles	(Czech Republic) Jan Kodeš; 8–6 6–1	(United States) Herb Fitzgibbon		
February	Scandinavian Covered Court Championships; Helsinki, Finland; Singles – Doubles	(Sweden) Ove Nils Bengtson; 6–3 6–1 4–6 6–4	(United Kingdom) Gerald Battrick		
February	City of Miami Championships; Miami, United States; Singles – Doubles	(Chile) Jaime Fillol; 13-11 5-7 9–7	(Ecuador) Pancho Guzman		
1 February	Omaha International Indoor; Civic Auditorium; Omaha, United States; Carpet (i)	(United States) Cliff Richey; 6–4, 6–2	(Mexico) Joaquín Loyo-Mayo	(United Kingdom) Mark Cox (United States) Clark Graebner	(United States) Bill Brown (United States) Tom Edlefsen (United States) Robert McKinley (Denmark) Torben Ulrich
2 February	Fidelity Bankers Invitational; Richmond, United States; Carpet (i)	(United States) Clark Graebner; 6–3, 10–12, 9–7	(Brazil) Thomaz Koch	(Denmark) Torben Ulrich (United States) Arthur Ashe	(United States) Jim McManus (United States) Charlie Pasarell (United States) Robert McKinley (United States) Cliff Richey
3 February	New Zealand Open; Auckland, New Zealand; Singles – Doubles	(Australia) Tony Roche; 6–1, 6–4, 4–6, 6–3	(Australia) Rod Laver	(South Africa) Raymond Moore (New Zealand) Brian Fairlie	(United Kingdom) Roger Taylor (United States) Pancho Gonzales (Australia) John Newcombe (Soviet Union) Toomas Leius
9 February	Buffalo Indoor; Buffalo, United States; Singles – Doubles	(United States) Clark Graebner; 2–6 9–7 8–6	(United Kingdom) Mark Cox		
15 Feb	Rothmans European Trophy Indoor; London, Great Britain; Hard (i)	(Denmark) Jan Leschly; 9–7, 7–5	(Spain) Manuel Orantes	(Italy) Nicola Pietrangeli (West Germany) Christian Kuhnke	(France) François Jauffret (United Kingdom) Gerald Battrick (Czechoslovakia) Vladimír Zedník (France) Patrice Beust
16 February	New South Wales Hard Court Championships; Cowra, Australia; Singles – Doubles	(Australia) Dick Crealy; 6–3 0–6 6–3	(Australia) Ray Ruffels		
16 Feb	U.S. National Indoor Tennis Championships; Salisbury, United States; Hard (i)	(United States) Stan Smith; 6–3, 6–8, 6–4, 6–4	(Egypt) Ismail El Shafei	(United States) Clark Graebner (Denmark) Torben Ulrich	(United States) Charlie Pasarell (United States) Ron Holmberg (Sweden) Ove Bengtson (United Kingdom) Mark Cox
16 Feb	U.S. National Indoor Tennis Championships; Salisbury, United States; Hard (i)	(United States) Stan Smith (United States) Bob Lutz; 7–9, 8–6, 6–4	(United States) Charlie Pasarell (United States) Ron Holmberg	(United States) Clark Graebner (Denmark) Torben Ulrich	(United States) Charlie Pasarell (United States) Ron Holmberg (Sweden) Ove Bengtson (United Kingdom) Mark Cox
16 February	French Covered Court Championships; Paris, France; Singles – Doubles	(France) Jean Pierre Courcol; 10-8 6–8 6–0 10-8	(United Kingdom) Graham Stilwell		
23 Feb	San Joaquin Challenge Cup; Stockton, United States; Hard	(France) Jean-Loup Rouyer; 11–9, 6–3	(United States) Gene Cantin	(Brazil) Carlos Kirmayr (United States) Tom Muench	(United States) Don Kierbow (United States) Ken Lowell (United States) John Reed (United States) Joe Weaver
23 February	Moscow International Indoor Championships; Moscow, Soviet Union; Singles – Doubles	(Soviet Union) Toomas Leius; 6–4 4–6 6–4 6–4	(Soviet Union) Vladimir Karlovich Palman		
23 Feb	Macon Indoor; Macon, United States; Carpet (i)	(Spain) Manuel Orantes; 10–8, 7–5, 4–6, 10–8	(United Kingdom) Mark Cox	(Brazil) Thomaz Koch (United States) Jim Osbourne	(Romania) Ilie Năstase (United Kingdom) Bobby Wilson (Ecuador) Pancho Guzmán (Socialist Federal Republic of Yugoslavia) Nikola Špear
24 Feb	Curaçao International Championships; Willemstad, Curaçao; Hard (i)	(United States) Cliff Richey; 6–2, 6–3	(United Kingdom) Mark Cox	(Australia) Ray Ruffels (Romania) Ilie Năstase	(Sweden) Ove Bengtson (West Germany) Ingo Buding (Venezuela) Jorge Andrew (Czechoslovakia) Jan Kukal

=== March ===
Date	Tournament	Winner	Finalist	Semifinalist	Quarterfinalist
March ?	Alexandria International Championships; Alexandria, Egypt; Singles – Doubles	(Hungary) István Gulyás; 6–1 3–6 6–3 7–5	(Egypt) Ismail El Shafei		
March ?	David Freed Indoor Invitational; Salt Lake City, United States; Hard (i); Singles – Doubles	(United States) Jim McManus; 6–3 6–3	(United States) Tom Gorman		
24 Feb-1 March	Kingston International Championships; Kingston, Jamaica; Hard (i)	(Brazil) Thomaz Koch; 6–2, 6–3	(Czechoslovakia) Milan Holeček	(West Germany) Hans-Joachim Plötz (Australia) Bill Bowrey	(Socialist Federal Republic of Yugoslavia) Nikola Špear (Socialist Federal Republic of Yugoslavia) Željko Franulović (New Zealand) Brian Fairlie (United Kingdom) Gerald Battrick
9 March	Riviera Championships; Menton LTC; Menton, France; Singles – Doubles	(Hungary) Géza Varga; 6–0 7–5	(Italy) Giuseppe Merlo	(Hungary) Szabolcs Baranyi (Italy) Sergio Palmieri	(Australia) Ian Fletcher (Austria) Detlev Herdy (United Kingdom) Stanley Matthews (Austria) Dieter Schultheiss
9 Mar	Altamira International; Caracas, Venezuela; Hard	(Brazil) Thomaz Koch; 8–6, 6–3, 2–6, 6–4	(United Kingdom) Mark Cox	(Czechoslovakia) Jan Kodeš (United Kingdom) Gerald Battrick	(Chile) Jaime Fillol (United States) Tom Edlefsen (Socialist Federal Republic of Yugoslavia) Nikola Špear (Chile) Luis Ayala
16 March	Egyptian International Championships; Cairo, Egypt; Singles – Doubles	(Egypt) Ismail El Shafei; 6–4 7-9 6–4 6–4	(Hungary) István Gulyás		
16 Mar	Colombian International; Barranquilla, Colombia; Clay	(Romania) Ilie Năstase; 6–4, 6–4, 8–10, 2–6, 6–3	(Czechoslovakia) Jan Kodeš	(United Kingdom) Mark Cox (Colombia) Jairo Velasco	(Brazil) Thomaz Koch (Socialist Federal Republic of Yugoslavia) Željko Franulović (Australia) Bill Bowrey (Chile) Jaime Fillol
24 Mar	New York Indoor; New York City, United States; Carpet (i); Singles- Doubles	(Spain) Andrés Gimeno; 6–1, 6–2, 3–6, 6–8, 9–7	(United States) Arthur Ashe	(Australia) Tony Roche (Australia) Roy Emerson	(Socialist Federal Republic of Yugoslavia) Željko Franulović (United States) Pancho Gonzales (Spain) Manuel Santana (United States) Charlie Pasarell
17 Mar	St. Petersburg Masters Invitational; St. Petersburg, Florida, United States; Clay	(Socialist Federal Republic of Yugoslavia) Željko Franulović; 6–4, 6–2, 6–4	(Chile) Jaime Fillol	(United States) Arthur Ashe (Brazil) José Edison Mandarino	(Australia) Ray Ruffels (West Germany) Hans-Joachim Plötz (United Kingdom) Gerald Battrick (Socialist Federal Republic of Yugoslavia) Nikola Špear
23 March	Thunderbird Invitation; Phoenix, Arizona, United States; Singles – Doubles	(United States) Cliff Richey; 6–4 6–4	(Spain) Manuel Santana		
30 March	Torneo Internazionale di Tennis Parioli; Roma, Italy; Singles – Doubles	(Australia) Martin Mulligan; 6–4 6–4 6–2	(Romania) Ion Țiriac		

=== April ===
Date	Tournament	Winner	Finalist	Semifinalist	Quarterfinalist
April ?	Mexican International; Mexico City, Mexico; Singles – Doubles	(Brazil) Thomaz Koch; 6–3 6–4 10-8	(Mexico) Rafael Osuna	(West Germany) Hans Joachim Plötz (Egypt) Ismail El Shafei	(West Germany) Ingo Buding (Mexico) Federico Cervantes (Ecuador) Pancho Guzmán (Australia) Ray Ruffels
April ?	River Plate Championships; Buenos Aires LTC; Buenos Aires , Argentina; Singles – Doubles	(Argentina) Julián Ganzabal; 6–2, 6–1, 6–4	(Argentina) Norberto Herrero		
April ?	Ojai Valley Championships; Ojai, California, United States; Singles – Doubles	(Pakistan) Haroon Rahim; 4–6 6–1 9–7	(United States) Jeff Borowiak		
6 April	Reggio Calabria International; Catanzaro, Calabria, Italia; Singles – Doubles	(Australia) Martin Mulligan; 6–2 4–6 6–3 6–1	(Romania) Ion Țiriac		
9 Apr	Carolinas International Tennis Tournament; Charlotte, North Carolina, United States; Clay	(United Kingdom) Mark Cox; 13–11, 6–2	(Czechoslovakia) Jan Kodeš	(Socialist Federal Republic of Yugoslavia) Željko Franulović (United States) Clark Graebner	(United States) Ron Holmberg (Czechoslovakia) Milan Holeček (Australia) Bill Bowrey (Australia) John Alexander
11 April	Tidewater International; Norfolk, Virginia, United States; Singles – Doubles	(East Germany) Hans Joachim Ploetz; 6–4 7–5	(Czechoslovakia) Jan Kukal		
12 April	South African Open; Johannesburg, South Africa; Hard; Singles – Doubles	(Australia) Rod Laver; 6–3, 10–8, 6–3	(Netherlands) Tom Okker	(South Africa) Cliff Drysdale (Australia) Tony Roche	(South Africa) Bob Hewitt (United States) Pancho Gonzales (South Africa) Raymond Moore (United States) Cliff Richey
12 April	Caribe Hilton International Championships; San Juan, Puerto Rico; Hard; Singles – Doubles	(United States) Arthur Ashe; 5–7, 5–7, 6–0, 6–4, 6–3	(United States) Charlie Pasarell	(Chile) Jaime Fillol (Sweden) Ove Bengtson	(United States) Tom Edlefsen (Czechoslovakia) Jan Kodeš (New Zealand) Brian Fairlie (Australia) Bill Bowrey
13 April	Catania International Open; Catania, Italy; Singles – Doubles	(United Kingdom) Graham Stilwell; 6–4 6–3 4–6 6–3	(Hungary) István Gulyás	(Poland) Wieslaw Gasiorek (Australia) Martin Mulligan	(Socialist Federal Republic of Yugoslavia) Boro Jovanović (Italy) Nicola Pietrangeli (Chile) Patricio Rodríguez (Romania) Ion Țiriac
14 Apr	Natal Open; Durban, South Africa; Hard	(South Africa) Robert Maud; 8–6, 4–6, 6–1, 6–4	(South Africa) Julian Krinsky	(South Africa) Bob Hewitt (Australia) Dick Crealy	(Australia) Bob Carmichael (South Africa) Cliff Drysdale (Australia) Peter Doerner (South Africa) Frew McMillan
14 Apr	Monte Carlo Open; Roquebrune-Cap-Martin, France; Clay	(Netherlands) Tom Okker; 8–10, 6–1, 7–5, 6–3	(Australia) John Newcombe	(Italy) Nicola Pietrangeli (Italy) Martin Mulligan	(Spain) Manuel Santana (France) François Jauffret (United States) Arthur Ashe (Spain) Andrés Gimeno
14 Apr	Monte Carlo Open; Roquebrune-Cap-Martin, France; Clay	(Australia) Owen Davidson (Australia) John Newcombe; 7–5, 11–13, 6–2, 6–1	(United States) Pancho Gonzales (United States) Dennis Ralston	(Italy) Nicola Pietrangeli (Italy) Martin Mulligan	(Spain) Manuel Santana (France) François Jauffret (United States) Arthur Ashe (Spain) Andrés Gimeno
15 Apr	River Oaks International Tennis Tournament; Houston, Texas, United States; Clay	(Socialist Federal Republic of Yugoslavia) Željko Franulović; 7–5, 6–3, 6–2	(Mexico) Rafael Osuna	(United States) Clark Graebner (Sweden) Ove Bengtson	(United States) Tom Edlefsen (United States) Robert McKinley (United States) Zan Guerry (Brazil) Thomaz Koch
20 April	Campionati Internazionali di Sicilia; Palermo, Italia; Singles – Doubles	(Romania) Ion Țiriac; 4–6 6–0 6–2 2–6 6–2	(Romania) Ilie Năstase		
21 Apr	Italian International Championships; Rome, Italy; Clay	(Australia) John Newcombe; 6–3, 4–6, 6–2, 5–7, 6–3	(Australia) Tony Roche	(Czechoslovakia) Jan Kodeš (Netherlands) Tom Okker	(Italy) Martin Mulligan (Egypt) Ismail El Shafei (United Kingdom) Graham Stilwell (South Africa) Cliff Drysdale
23 Apr	Dallas Invitational; Dallas, United States; Carpet (i)	(United States) Stan Smith; 6–3, 6–4	(Brazil) Thomaz Koch	(Sweden) Ove Bengtson (United States) Tom Edlefsen	(Australia) Ray Ruffels (Australia) Phil Dent (Ecuador) Pancho Guzmán (United States) Jim McManus
26 April	Cumberland Hard Court Championships; Hampstead, Great Britain; Singles – Doubles	(United Kingdom) Bobby Wilson; 6–3 6–1	(United Kingdom) Keith Wooldridge		
25 Apr	Anaheim Pro Invitational; Anaheim, California, United States; 10,000 $ – carpet (i)	(Australia) Rod Laver; 25–10, 26–24, 25–13	(United States) Ron Holmberg	3rd place (United States) Dennis Ralston 4th place (United States) Pancho Gonzales	(United States) Alex Olmedo (United States) Butch Buchholz (Ecuador) Pancho Segura (Australia) Roy Emerson
28 Apr	British Hard Court Championships; Bournemouth, Great Britain; Clay	(Australia) John Newcombe; 6–8, 6–3, 5–7, 6–4, 6–4	(South Africa) Bob Hewitt	(Australia) Fred Stolle (United Kingdom) Roger Taylor	(United Kingdom) Mark Cox (Australia) Dick Crealy (United Kingdom) Graham Stilwell (France) Jean-Claude Barclay

=== May ===
Date	Tournament	Winner	Finalist	Semifinalist	Quarterfinalist
May ?	Jacksonville Invitation; Jacksonville, United States; Singles – Doubles	(Ecuador) Pancho Guzman; 6–4 6–2	(Canada) Michael Belkin		
1 May	Northern California Championships; San Francisco, United States; Singles – Doubles	(United States) Brown Tom; 6–4 6–8 7-9 8–6 6–1	(United States) Erik Van Dillen		
4 May	California State Championships; Portola Valley, United States; Singles – Doubles	(United States) Erik Van Dillen; 6–3 6–4 6–2	(United States) Paul Gerken		
4 May	Atlanta Invitational; Atlanta, United States; Singles – Doubles	(Brazil) Thomaz Koch; 6–3 6–2	(Australia) Bill Bowrey		
4 May	Campionato Partenopeo; Naples, Italy; Singles – Doubles	(Chile) Patricio Rodríguez; 8–6 6–3 0–6 6–3	(Australia) Martin Mulligan		
5 May	Stuttgart Weissenhof International; Singles – Doubles	(West Germany) Christian Kuhnke; 2–6 6–2 6–0 6–2	(West Germany) Wilhelm Bungert		
10 May	World Pro Tennis Japan Series; Tokyo, Japan; Carpet (i)	(Netherlands) Tom Okker; 6–3, 6–5	(Australia) Roy Emerson	3rd place (Australia) Rod Laver 4th place (United States) Butch Buchholz	Round robin (United States) Pancho Gonzales (United States) Dennis Ralston (Australia) Tony Roche (United States) Marty Riessen (South Africa) Raymond Moore (United States) Ron Holmberg
10 May	Surrey Hard Court Championships; Guildford, Great Britain; Singles – Doubles	(Australia) Dick Crealy; 4–6 7–5 6–2	(United Kingdom) Keith Wooldridge		
12 May	Belgian Open Championships; Brussels, Belgium; Clay	(Netherlands) Tom Okker; 6–4, 1–6, 6–2, 6–2	(Socialist Federal Republic of Yugoslavia) Željko Franulović	(United States) Arthur Ashe (Australia) John Newcombe	(United Kingdom) Roger Taylor (South Africa) Bob Hewitt (Egypt) Ismail El Shafei (United States) Cliff Richey
12 May	Melia Trophy; Madrid, Spain; Singles – Doubles	(Spain) Manuel Santana; 9-11 6–4 8–6 6–1	(United States) Arthur Ashe		
12 May	Torneo Godo; Barcelona, Spain; Clay	(Spain) Manuel Orantes; 6–4, 7–5, 6–4	(Spain) Manuel Santana	(Australia) Barry Phillips-Moore (West Germany) Ingo Buding	(Italy) Martin Mulligan (Australia) Geoff Masters (Italy) Nicola Pietrangeli (Brazil) José Edison Mandarino
12 May	Southern California Championships; Los Angeles, United States; Singles – Doubles	(United States) Stan Smith; 6–3 6–4	(United States) Robert Lutz		
15 May	Madison Square Garden Pro; New York, United States; 25,000 $ – carpet (i)	(Australia) Rod Laver; 6–2, 4–6, 6–1	(Australia) Roy Emerson		Round robin (United States) Pancho Gonzales (South Africa) Raymond Moore (United States) Dennis Ralston (United States) Marty Riessen (Australia) Tony Roche (Australia) Fred Stolle
16 May	London Hard Court Championships; Hurlingham, London, Great Britain; Singles – Doubles	(New Zealand) Brian Fairlie; 11–9 6–3	(United Kingdom) Graham Stilwell		
18 May	Glenwood Manor National Invitational; Kansas City, United States; Singles – Doubles	(United States) Clark Graebner; 6–4 3–6 6–3	(United States) Tom Edlefsen		
19 May	West Berlin Open; West Berlin, West Germany; Clay	(South Africa) Raymond Moore; 1–6, 6–1, 7–5, 6–8, 7–5	(South Africa) Cliff Drysdale	(United Kingdom) Roger Taylor (Italy) Martin Mulligan	(United States) Arthur Ashe (South Africa) Bob Hewitt (United States) Marty Riessen (United States) Ron Holmberg
22 May	Netherlands National Professional Championships; Amsterdam / Eindhoven, Netherlands; Clay	(Netherlands) Tom Okker; 6–4, 6–3	(Spain) Andrés Gimeno	3rd place (Australia) Tony Roche 4th place (Australia) Rod Laver	Round robin (United States) Dennis Ralston (Australia) Ken Rosewall (Australia) Roy Emerson (United States) Butch Buchholz
24 May	Rothmans Connaught Hard Court Championships; Chingford, Great Britain; Singles – Doubles	(Australia) Allan Stone; 6–4 6–2	(Australia) John Cooper		
21 May	British Indoor Championships; Wembley, Great Britain; Hard (i)	(Australia) Rod Laver; 8–6, 6–0	(Australia) Ken Rosewall	(Netherlands) Tom Okker (Australia) Tony Roche	
26 May	French Open; Paris, France; Grand Slam; Clay; Singles – Doubles – Mixed doubles	(Australia) Rod Laver; 6–4, 6–3, 6–4	(Australia) Ken Rosewall	(Australia) Tony Roche (Netherlands) Tom Okker	(Socialist Federal Republic of Yugoslavia) Željko Franulović (Australia) Fred Stolle (Australia) John Newcombe (Spain) Andrés Gimeno
26 May	French Open; Paris, France; Grand Slam; Clay; Singles – Doubles – Mixed doubles	(Australia) John Newcombe (Australia) Tony Roche; 4–6, 6–1, 3–6, 6–4, 6–4	(Australia) Roy Emerson (Australia) Rod Laver	(Australia) Tony Roche (Netherlands) Tom Okker	(Socialist Federal Republic of Yugoslavia) Željko Franulović (Australia) Fred Stolle (Australia) John Newcombe (Spain) Andrés Gimeno
26 May	U.S. Hard Court Championships; Sacramento, United States; Hard	(United States) Clark Graebner; 6–4, 3–6, 4–6, 6–0, 7–5	(United States) Erik van Dillen	(United States) Jim McManus (United States) Allen Fox	(United States) Mike Machette (Mexico) Joaquín Loyo Mayo (United States) Jim Osborne (United States) Bob Lutz
31 May	Surrey Grass Court Championships; Surbiton, Great Britain; Singles – Doubles	(United Kingdom) Gerald Battrick; 6–2 6–1	(Australia) John Cooper		

=== June ===
Date	Tournament	Winner	Finalist	Semifinalist	Quarterfinalist
June ?	Bielefeld International; Bielefeld, Germany; Singles – Doubles	(West Germany) Harald Eischenbroich; 7–5 6–2 6–3	(Australia) Barry Phillips-Moore		
June ?	Victorian Hard Court Championships; Melbourne, Australia; Singles – Doubles	(Australia) Neale Fraser	?		
1 June	Tulsa Invitation; Tulsa, United States; Singles – Doubles	(Brazil) Thomaz Koch; 6–2 8–6	(Mexico) Vicente Zarazua		
2 Jun	Northern Championships; Manchester, Great Britain; Grass	(United States) Clark Graebner; 9–7, 3–6, 6–4	(United Kingdom) Graham Stilwell	(United States) Tom Gorman (Australia) Allan McDonald	(Australia) John Cooper (United Kingdom) Gerald Battrick (Australia) Ian Fletcher (Chile) Luis Ayala
2 June	Copenhagen International; Copenhagen, Denmark; Singles – Doubles	(Australia) Martin Mulligan; 6–4 4–6 9–7 12-14 6–1	(Denmark) Jan Leschly		
9 Jun	West of England Open Championships; Bristol, Great Britain; Grass	(Australia) Ken Rosewall; 8–10, 6–3, 6–1	(France) Pierre Barthès	(Australia) Roy Emerson (United States) Clark Graebner	(Australia) Dick Crealy (United States) Arthur Ashe (Australia) John Newcombe (South Africa) Cliff Drysdale
9 Jun	Kent Championships; Beckenham, Great Britain; Grass	(Sweden) Ove Bengtson; 6–4, 7–5	(United States) Tom Gorman	(United Kingdom) John Barrett (Australia) Bill Bowrey	(Australia) John Alexander (Australia) Ken Fletcher (United States) Gerry Perry (Australia) Phil Dent
14 June	John Player Open; Nottingham, Great Britain; Singles – Doubles	(Australia) John Cooper; 6–2 6–4	(Australia) Geoff Masters		
15 June	Moroccan International Championships; Casablanca, Morocco; Singles – Doubles	(Socialist Federal Republic of Yugoslavia) Željko Franulović; 2–6 6–1 6–2 6–3	(Australia) Barry Phillips-Moore		
16 Jun	Queen's Club Championships; London, Great Britain; Grass	(Australia) Fred Stolle; 6–3, 22–20	(Australia) John Newcombe	(United States) Dennis Ralston (Australia) Rod Laver	(Netherlands) Tom Okker (United States) Ron Holmberg (United States) Charlie Pasarell (Spain) Andrés Gimeno
16 Jun	Queen's Club Championships; London, Great Britain; Grass	(Australia) Owen Davidson (United States) Dennis Ralston; 8–6, 6–3	(Sweden) Ove Bengtson (Brazil) Thomaz Koch	(United States) Dennis Ralston (Australia) Rod Laver	(Netherlands) Tom Okker (United States) Ron Holmberg (United States) Charlie Pasarell (Spain) Andrés Gimeno
23 Jun	Wimbledon Championships; London, Great Britain; Grand Slam; Grass; Singles – Doubles – Mixed doubles	(Australia) Rod Laver; 6–4, 5–7, 6–4, 6–4	(Australia) John Newcombe	(United States) Arthur Ashe (Australia) Tony Roche	(South Africa) Cliff Drysdale (United States) Bob Lutz (Netherlands) Tom Okker (United States) Clark Graebner
23 Jun	Wimbledon Championships; London, Great Britain; Grand Slam; Grass; Singles – Doubles – Mixed doubles	(Australia) John Newcombe (Australia) Tony Roche; 7–5, 11–9, 6–3	(Netherlands) Tom Okker (United States) Marty Riessen	(United States) Arthur Ashe (Australia) Tony Roche	(South Africa) Cliff Drysdale (United States) Bob Lutz (Netherlands) Tom Okker (United States) Clark Graebner

=== July ===
Date	Tournament	Winner	Finalist	Semifinalist	Quarterfinalist
July ?	Alabama State Championships; Mobile, United States; Singles – Doubles	(Canada) Michael Belkin; 6–3 9-11 6–3	(South Africa) Peter D. Van Lingen		
July ?	Southern Championships; Birmingham, Alabama, United States; Singles – Doubles	(United States) Turner Howard; 6–2 6–3	(United States) James Pressly		
? Luglio	Tennessee Valley Championships; Chattanooga, United States; Singles – Doubles	(Mexico) Joaquín Loyo-Mayo; 7–5 6–8 6–1	(United States) Zan Guerry		
7 July	Travemünde International; Travemünde, Germany; Singles – Doubles	(Romania) Ilie Năstase; 6–2 7–5 1–6 2–6 6–4	(Hungary) István Gulyás		
7 Jul	Irish Lawn Tennis Championships; Dublin, Ireland; Grass	(South Africa) Bob Hewitt; 6–3, 6–2	(Socialist Federal Republic of Yugoslavia) Nikola Pilić	(United Kingdom) Roger Taylor (Australia) Roy Emerson	(Australia) Owen Davidson (Australia) Mal Anderson (Denmark) Torben Ulrich (Australia) Ray Ruffels
7 Jul	Washington Star International; Washington, D.C., United States; Clay	(Brazil) Thomaz Koch; 7–5, 9–7, 4–6, 2–6, 6–4	(United States) Arthur Ashe	3rd place (Canada) Mike Belkin 4th place (Egypt) Ismail El Shafei	(United States) Charlie Pasarell (United States) Cliff Richey (Chile) Jaime Fillol (Australia) Bill Bowrey
7 Jul	Washington Star International; Washington, D.C., United States; Clay	(Chile) Patricio Cornejo (Chile) Jaime Fillol	(United States) Stan Smith (United States) Robert Lutz	3rd place (Canada) Mike Belkin 4th place (Egypt) Ismail El Shafei	(United States) Charlie Pasarell (United States) Cliff Richey (Chile) Jaime Fillol (Australia) Bill Bowrey
7 Jul	Swedish International Championships; Båstad, Sweden; Clay	(Spain) Manuel Santana; 8–6, 6–4, 6–1	(Romania) Ion Țiriac	(Czechoslovakia) Jan Kodeš (Italy) Martin Mulligan	(Sweden) Jan-Erik Lundqvist (Chile) Patricio Rodríguez (Romania) Ilie Năstase (Czechoslovakia) František Pála
9 Jul	U.S. Pro Tennis Championships; Boston, United States; Hard	(Australia) Rod Laver; 7–5, 6–2, 4–6, 6–1	(Australia) John Newcombe	(Australia) Ken Rosewall (Australia) Fred Stolle	(Netherlands) Tom Okker (United States) Pancho Gonzales (United States) Ron Holmberg (France) Pierre Barthès
12 July	Scottish Championships; Edinburgh, Great Britain; Singles – Doubles	(United Kingdom) John Clifton; 6–2 2–6 6–4	(United Kingdom) Paul Hutchins		
12 July	Welsh Championships; Newport, Great Britain; Singles – Doubles	(United Kingdom) Mark Cox; 6–4 6–4	(United Kingdom) Graham Stilwell		
12 July	East of England Championships; Felixstowe, Great Britain; Singles – Doubles	(Australia) Bob Giltinan; 8–6 1–6 8–6	(South Africa) Byron Bertram		
13 July	Düsseldorf International; Düsseldorf, Germany; Singles – Doubles	(West Germany) Christian Kuhnke; 6–4 6–8 6–2 6–2	(West Germany) Wilhelm Bungert		
14 Jul	Tri-State Tennis Tournament; Cincinnati, United States; Clay	(United States) Cliff Richey; 6–1, 6–2	(Australia) Allan Stone	(Canada) Mike Belkin (Ecuador) Pancho Guzmán	(Socialist Federal Republic of Yugoslavia) Željko Franulović (United States) Stan Smith (United States) Erik van Dillen (United States) Arthur Ashe
14 Jul	Tri-State Tennis Tournament; Cincinnati, United States; Clay	(United States) Robert Lutz (United States) Stan Smith	(United States) Arthur Ashe (United States) Charlie Pasarell	(Canada) Mike Belkin (Ecuador) Pancho Guzmán	(Socialist Federal Republic of Yugoslavia) Željko Franulović (United States) Stan Smith (United States) Erik van Dillen (United States) Arthur Ashe
16 Jul	*South of England Championships; Eastbourne, Great Britain; Grass	(West Germany) Christian Kuhnke; 6–4, 2–6, 9–7	(Spain) Manuel Orantes	(India) Jaidip Mukerjea (Australia) John Cooper	(United States) Jeff Borowiak (United Kingdom) Chris Bovett (West Germany) Ingo Buding (Pakistan) Haroon Rahim
18 Jul	Milwaukee Pro Championships; Milwaukee, United States; Clay	(Netherlands) Tom Okker; 6–3, 6–4	(United States) Marty Riessen	3rd place (Australia) Tony Roche 4th place (Australia) John Newcombe	(United States) Dennis Ralston (United States) Ron Holmberg (United States) Butch Buchholz (South Africa) Raymond Moore
19 July	Essex Championships; Colchester, Great Britain; Singles – Doubles	(Australia) Graham Primrose; 6–4 6–3	(United Kingdom) Keith Wooldridge		
19 July	Tri-State Tennis Tournament; Cincinnati, United States; Singles – Doubles	(United States) Cliff Richey; 6–1 6–2	(Australia) Allan Stone		
19 July	Tri-State Tennis Tournament; Cincinnati, United States; Singles – Doubles	(United States) Robert Lutz (United States) Stan Smith	(United States) Arthur Ashe (Puerto Rico) Charlie Pasarell		
20 July	Aix-en-Provence Golden Racket; Aix-en-Provence, France; Singles – Doubles	(Australia) Roy Emerson; 6–3 6–4 8–6	(West Germany) Harald Eischenbroich		
20 July	North of England Championships; Hoylake, Great Britain; Singles – Doubles	(Australia) Ray Ruffels; 6–3 6–3	(New Zealand) Brian Fairlie		
21 Jul	U.S. Men's Clay Court Championships; Indianapolis, USA; Clay	(Socialist Federal Republic of Yugoslavia) Željko Franulović; 8–6, 6–3, 6–4	(United States) Arthur Ashe	3rd place (United States) Clark Graebner 4th place (United States) Charlie Pasarell	(United States) Cliff Richey (Chile) Luis Ayala (United States) Stan Smith (Canada) Mike Belkin
21 Jul	U.S. Men's Clay Court Championships; Indianapolis, USA; Clay	(United States) Clark Graebner (Australia) Bill Bowrey	(Australia) Dick Crealy (Australia) Allan Stone	3rd place (United States) Clark Graebner 4th place (United States) Charlie Pasarell	(United States) Cliff Richey (Chile) Luis Ayala (United States) Stan Smith (Canada) Mike Belkin
21 Jul	Bavarian Open; Munich, West Germany; Clay	(South Africa) Bob Hewitt; 6–4, 6–2, 3–6, 6–2	(West Germany) Christian Kuhnke	(South Africa) Bob Maud (Australia) Ray Ruffels	(India) Premjit Lall (West Germany) Hans-Joachim Plötz (Colombia) Iván Molina (Hungary) Attila Korpás
22 Jul	Swiss Open; Gstaad, Switzerland; Clay	(Australia) Roy Emerson; 6–1, 12–14, 6–4, 6–4	(Netherlands) Tom Okker	(South Africa) Cliff Drysdale (France) François Jauffret	(Czechoslovakia) Jan Kukal (Australia) Owen Davidson (United States) Marty Riessen (United Kingdom) Roger Taylor
22 Jul	Swiss Open; Gstaad, Switzerland; Clay	(Netherlands) Tom Okker (United States) Marty Riessen; 6–1, 6–4	(Australia) Mal Anderson (Australia) Roy Emerson	(South Africa) Cliff Drysdale (France) François Jauffret	(Czechoslovakia) Jan Kukal (Australia) Owen Davidson (United States) Marty Riessen (United Kingdom) Roger Taylor
28 July	Torneo de La Coruña; La Coruña, Spain; Singles – Doubles	(Romania) Ilie Năstase; 4–6 6–4 6–2 11–9	(Spain) Manuel Orantes		
28 Jul	Eastern Grass Court Championships; South Orange, United States; Grass	(United States) Stan Smith; 6–1, 6–4, 6–4	(United States) Clark Graebner	(United States) Arthur Ashe (United States) Bob Lutz	(United States) Gene Scott (United States) Jim Osborne (United States) Butch Seewagen (United States) Charlie Pasarell
28 Jul	Netherlands International Championships; Hilversum, Netherlands; Clay	(Netherlands) Tom Okker; 10–8, 7–9, 6–4, 6–4	(United Kingdom) Roger Taylor	(Czechoslovakia) Vladimír Zedník (Czechoslovakia) Jan Kodeš	(Czechoslovakia) Jan Kukal (France) Michel Leclercq (Australia) Barry Phillips-Moore (West Germany) Christian Kuhnke
29 July	Bavarian Open; Munich, Germany; Singles – Doubles	(South Africa) Bob Hewitt; 6–4 6–2 3–6 6–2	(West Germany) Christian Kuhnke		
30 Jul	Austrian Pro Championships; Pörtschach, Austria; Clay	(Australia) Roy Emerson; 6–3, 3–6, 6–3	(South Africa) Cliff Drysdale	3rd place (United States) Marty Riessen 4th place (Socialist Federal Republic of Yugoslavia) Nikola Pilić	Round robin (United States) Ron Holmberg (Australia) Mal Anderson (South Africa) Raymond Moore (France) Pierre Barthès

=== August ===
Date	Tournament	Winner	Finalist	Semifinalist	Quarterfinalist
? August	Istanbul International; Istanbul, Turkey; Singles – Doubles	(South Africa) Bob Hewitt; 6–3 8–6 6–1	(South Africa) Robert Maud		
? August	Eastern Grass Court Championships; South Orange, United States; Singles – Doubles	(United States) Stan Smith; 6–1 6–4 6–4	(United States) Clark Graebner		
3 August	Netherlands International Championships; Hilversum, Paesi Bassi; Singles – Doubles	(Netherlands) Tom Okker; 10-8 7-9 6–4 6–4	(United Kingdom) Roger Taylor		
3 August	Quebec International Round Robin; Quebec City, Canada; Clay; Singles – Doubles	(South Africa) Bob Hewitt; 6–3, 3–6, 6–2, 8–6	(Socialist Federal Republic of Yugoslavia) Željko Franulović		
4 Aug	Southampton Invitation; Southampton, New York, United States; Grass	(United States) Clark Graebner; 6–2, 6–2, 6–4	(United States) Robert Lutz	(Australia) Bill Bowrey (Australia) Allan Stone	(Chile) Patricio Cornejo (United States) Gene Scott (South Africa) Terry Ryan (France) Georges Goven
4 Aug	Canadian Open; Toronto, Canada; Clay	(United States) Cliff Richey; 6–4, 5–7, 6–4, 6–0	(United States) Butch Buchholz	(Canada) Mike Belkin (Australia) John Newcombe	(South Africa) Raymond Moore (United States) Lester Sack (Ecuador) Pancho Guzmán (Australia) Dick Crealy
4 Aug	Canadian Open; Toronto, Canada; Clay	(Australia) John Newcombe (United States) Ron Holmberg; 6–3, 6–4	(South Africa) Raymond Moore (United States) Butch Buchholz	(Canada) Mike Belkin (Australia) John Newcombe	(South Africa) Raymond Moore (United States) Lester Sack (Ecuador) Pancho Guzmán (Australia) Dick Crealy
4 Aug	German International Championships; Hamburg, West Germany; Clay	(Australia) Tony Roche; 6–1, 5–7, 7–5, 8–6	(Netherlands) Tom Okker	(West Germany) Christian Kuhnke (South Africa) Cliff Drysdale	(South Africa) Bob Hewitt (Australia) Roy Emerson (Socialist Federal Republic of Yugoslavia) Željko Franulović (West Germany) Wilhelm Bungert
4 August	Bad Neuenahr International; Bad Neuenahr, Germany; Singles – Doubles	(Australia) Martin Mulligan; 6–3 3–6 13-11 6–2	(West Germany) Wilhelm Bungert		
9 August	Senigallia Open; Senigallia, Italy; Singles – Doubles	(Australia) Martin Mulligan; 13-11 6–2 6–2	(Brazil) Thomaz Koch		
11 Aug	Austrian International Championships; Kitzbühel, Austria; Clay	(Spain) Manuel Santana; 6–4, 6–2, 6–3	(Spain) Manuel Orantes	(Czechoslovakia) Milan Holeček (Socialist Federal Republic of Yugoslavia) Željko Franulović	(Australia) Barry Phillips-Moore (France) François Jauffret (West Germany) Wilhelm Bungert (South Africa) Bob Hewitt
16 Aug	US National Amateur Championships; Boston, United States; Grass	(United States) Stan Smith; 9–7, 6–3, 6–1	(United States) Robert Lutz	(United States) Charlie Pasarell (United States) Arthur Ashe	(Australia) Ray Ruffels (United States) Clark Graebner (United States) Roy Barth (Australia) Allan Stone
17 August	Pennsylvania Lawn Tennis Championships; Philadelphia, United States; Singles – Doubles	(United States) Cliff Richey; 6–4 7-9 6–2 6–4	(Australia) Bob Carmichael		
18 August	Hungarian International Championships; Budapest, Hungary; Singles – Doubles	(Romania) Ilie Năstase; 9–7 6–4 6–2	(Hungary) István Gulyás		
20 Aug	Newport Casino Invitational; Newport, United States; Grass	(Netherlands) Tom Okker; 4–6, 6–5, 5–2	(United States) Dennis Ralston	Round robin (South Africa) Raymond Moore (United Kingdom) Roger Taylor (Socialist Federal Republic of Yugoslavia) Nikola Pilić (United States) Marty Riessen (United States) Ronald Holmberg (United States) Butch Buchholz	
23 August	Moscow International Championships; Moscow, Soviet Union; Singles – Doubles	(Soviet Union) Toomas Leius; 2–6 6–4 6–2 6–3	(Soviet Union) An Volkov		
24 August	Newport VASSS; Newport, United States; Singles – Doubles	(Netherlands) Tom Okker; 4–6 6-5 5-2	(United States) Dennis Ralston		
27 Aug	U.S. Open; New York, United States; Grand Slam; Grass; Singles – Doubles – Mixed doubles	(Australia) Rod Laver; 7–9, 6–1, 6–3, 6–2	(Australia) Tony Roche	(United States) Arthur Ashe (Australia) John Newcombe	(Australia) Roy Emerson (Australia) Ken Rosewall (United States) Butch Buchholz (Australia) Fred Stolle
27 Aug	U.S. Open; New York, United States; Grand Slam; Grass; Singles – Doubles – Mixed doubles	(Australia) Ken Rosewall (Australia) Fred Stolle; 2–6, 7–5, 13–11, 6–3	(United States) Charlie Pasarell (United States) Dennis Ralston	(United States) Arthur Ashe (Australia) John Newcombe	(Australia) Roy Emerson (Australia) Ken Rosewall (United States) Butch Buchholz (Australia) Fred Stolle

=== September ===
Date	Tournament	Winner	Finalist	Semifinalist	Quarterfinalist
? September	Heart of America Championships; Kansas City, United States; Singles – Doubles	(United Kingdom) Gerald Battrick; 6–3 6–4	(Australia) Bill Bowrey		
6 September	Lebanon International Championships; Beirut, Lebanon; Singles – Doubles	(South Africa) Bob Hewitt; 7–5 7–5 6–2	(Brazil) Edison Mandarino		
8 Sep	Chicago Pro; Chicago, United States; Carpet (i)	(Australia) Ken Rosewall; 6–3, 6–4	(United States) Butch Buchholz	(France) Pierre Barthès (Spain) Andrés Gimeno	(United States) Ron Holmberg (United States) Marty Riessen (United Kingdom) Roger Taylor (South Africa) Raymond Moore
12 Sep	Atlanta Pro; Atlanta, United States; Hard	(United States) Butch Buchholz; 6–4, 5–7, 6–4, 5–7, 6–2	(Australia) John Newcombe	3rd place (Netherlands) Tom Okker 4th place (Australia) Tony Roche	(United States) Marty Riessen (Socialist Federal Republic of Yugoslavia) Nikola Pilić (France) Pierre Barthès (United Kingdom) Roger Taylor
20 Sep	Pacific Southwest Championships; Los Angeles, United States; Hard	(United States) Pancho Gonzales; 6–0, 7–5	(United States) Cliff Richey	(United States) Butch Buchholz (United States) Jim Osborne	(United States) Bob Lutz (Brazil) Thomaz Koch (United States) Arthur Ashe (United States) Stan Smith
20 Sep	Pacific Southwest Championships; Los Angeles, United States; Hard	(United States) Ron Holmberg (United States) Pancho Gonzales; 6–3, 6–4	(United States) Jim McManus (United States) Jim Osborne	(United States) Butch Buchholz (United States) Jim Osborne	(United States) Bob Lutz (Brazil) Thomaz Koch (United States) Arthur Ashe (United States) Stan Smith
29 Sep	Pacific Coast Championships; Berkeley, United States; Hard	(United States) Stan Smith; 6–2, 6–2	(United States) Cliff Richey	3rd place (United States) Arthur Ashe 4th place (Brazil) Thomaz Koch	(Australia) Bob Carmichael (United States) Roy Barth (Chile) Jaime Fillol (United States) Jeff Borowiak

=== October ===
Date	Tournament	Winner	Finalist	Semifinalist	Quarterfinalist
? October	Northwest Invitation; Minneapolis, United States; Singles – Doubles	(United States) Tom Edlefsen; 6–0 6–3	(United States) Davies		
2 Oct	Venezuelan National Clay Court Championships; Caracas, Venezuela; Clay; Singles – Doubles	(Venezuela) Humphrey Hose; 3–6 6–2 6–4 3–6 6–1	(Venezuela) Julio Moros		
5 Oct	Tucson Pro; Tucson, United States; Singles – Doubles	(Australia) Tony Roche; 9–7 6–1	(Netherlands) Tom Okker		
6 Oct	Howard Hughes Open Tennis Championships; Las Vegas, United States; Hard	(United States) Pancho Gonzales; 6–0, 6–2, 6–4	(United States) Arthur Ashe	(United States) Stan Smith (Australia) Roy Emerson	(Australia) Ken Rosewall (Australia) Rod Laver (United States) Bob Lutz (United States) Cliff Richey
17 Oct	Denver VASS Invitation; Denver, United States; Hard (i)	(Romania) Ilie Năstase; 6–4, 6–5	(United States) Arthur Ashe	3rd place (United States) Bob Lutz 4th place (United States) Arthur Ashe	(Romania) Ion Țiriac (United States) Charlie Pasarell
18 October	Dewar Cup Perth; Perth, Scotland, Great Britain; Singles – Doubles	(Egypt) Ismail El Shafei; 3–6 14-12 6–1	(United Kingdom) Mark Cox		
19 ottobre	Spanish Championships; Madrid, Spain; Singles – Doubles	(Spain) Manuel Santana; 6–1 6–3 8–6	(Spain) Juan Gisbert		
20 October	Torneo di Ancona; Ancona, Italy; Singles – Doubles	(Romania) Ilie Năstase; 6–4 7–5	(United States) Stan Smith		
25 October	Australian Hard Court Championships; Sydney, Australia; Singles – Doubles	(Australia) Ray Ruffels; 6–4 6–4 3–6 5-7 6–3	(Australia) Ken Fletcher		
25 October	Dewar Cup Stalybridge; Stalybridge, Great Britain; Singles – Doubles	(United Kingdom) Mark Cox; 6–4 6–3	(South Africa) Bob Hewitt		

=== November ===
Date	Tournament	Winner	Finalist	Semifinalist	Quarterfinalist
? Novembre	La Costa Invitational; La Costa, United States; Singles – Doubles	(Australia) Bob Carmichael; 7–5 6–3	(United States) Tom Edlefsen		
? November	Chile International Championships; Santiago, Chile; Singles – Doubles	(Czechoslovakia) Jan Kodeš; 4–6 6–3 1–6 6–1 6–1	(Czechoslovakia) Milan Holeček		
1 November	Dewar Cup Aberavon; Aberavon, Great Britain; Singles – Doubles	(Australia) Lew Hoad; 9–7 6–1	(South Africa) Bob Hewitt		
7 Nov	Paris Open; Paris, France; Carpet (i)	(Netherlands) Tom Okker; 8–6, 6–2, 6–1	(United States) Butch Buchholz	3rd place (United States) Marty Riessen 4th place (Australia) Tony Roche	(United Kingdom) Roger Taylor (Romania) Ion Țiriac (France) Pierre Barthès (Australia) John Newcombe
7 Nov	Barcelona Pro Championships; Barcelona, Spain; Clay	(Spain) Andrés Gimeno; 10–8, 2–6, 3–6, 6–4, 6–1	(Australia) Rod Laver	3rd place (Australia) Roy Emerson 4th place (Australia) Fred Stolle	
8 November	Dewar Cup Torquay; Torquay, Great Britain; Singles – Doubles	(United Kingdom) Mark Cox; 8–6 6–3	(United Kingdom) John Clifton		
10 Nov	South American Championships; Buenos Aires, Argentina; Clay	(France) François Jauffret; 3–6, 6–2, 6–4, 6–3	(Socialist Federal Republic of Yugoslavia) Željko Franulović	(Australia) Roy Emerson (United States) Cliff Richey	(West Germany) Ingo Buding (Czechoslovakia) Jan Kodeš (Colombia) Iván Molina (Argentina) Guillermo Vilas
10 Nov	South American Championships; Buenos Aires, Argentina; Clay	(Chile) Jaime Fillol (Chile) Patricio Cornejo; W/O	(Australia) Roy Emerson (South Africa) Frew McMillan	(Australia) Roy Emerson (United States) Cliff Richey	(West Germany) Ingo Buding (Czechoslovakia) Jan Kodeš (Colombia) Iván Molina (Argentina) Guillermo Vilas
13 Nov	Dewar Cup London; London, Great Britain; Carpet (i)	(United Kingdom) Mark Cox; 4–6, 9–7, 6–2	(South Africa) Bob Hewitt	(United States) Stan Smith (United Kingdom) Graham Stilwell	(Australia) Lew Hoad (United Kingdom) John Clifton (Egypt) Ismail El Shafei (United States) Charlie Pasarell
13 Nov	Vienna Pro Championships; Vienna, Austria; Hard (i)	(Australia) Tony Roche; W/O	(Netherlands) Tom Okker	Round robin (Socialist Federal Republic of Yugoslavia) Nikola Pilić (South Africa) Cliff Drysdale (United Kingdom) Roger Taylor (France) Pierre Barthès (Australia) John Newcombe (United States) Butch Buchholz	
17 Nov	British Covered Court Championships; London, Great Britain; Carpet (i)	(Australia) Rod Laver; 6–4, 6–1, 6–3	(Australia) Tony Roche	3rd place (Netherlands) Tom Okker 4th place (United States) Butch Buchholz	(United Kingdom) Roger Taylor (United States) Pancho Gonzales (United Kingdom) Graham Stilwell (United States) Stan Smith
24 Nov	Stockholm Open; Stockholm, Sweden; Hard (i)	(Socialist Federal Republic of Yugoslavia) Nikola Pilić; 6–4, 4–6, 6–2	(Romania) Ilie Năstase	3rd place (United States) Stan Smith 4th place (Australia) Fred Stolle	(Romania) Ion Țiriac (Spain) Andrés Gimeno (United States) Charlie Pasarell (Australia) Rod Laver
24 Nov	Stockholm Open; Stockholm, Sweden; Hard (i)	(Australia) Roy Emerson (Australia) Rod Laver; 6–4, 6–2	(Spain) Andrés Gimeno (United Kingdom) Graham Stilwell	3rd place (United States) Stan Smith 4th place (Australia) Fred Stolle	(Romania) Ion Țiriac (Spain) Andrés Gimeno (United States) Charlie Pasarell (Australia) Rod Laver

=== December ===
Date	Tournament	Winner	Finalist	Semifinalist	Quarterfinalist
1 December	Border Championships; East London, South Africa; Singles – Doubles	(South Africa) Robert Maud; 5-7 6–3 8–6	(South Africa) Bob Hewitt		
1 Dec	Queensland Championships; Brisbane, Australia; Grass	(Australia) Ray Ruffels; 8–6, 4–6, 6–3, 6–3	(Australia) Allan Stone	(Australia) John Alexander (Australia) Ian Fletcher	(Australia) Bob Giltinan (Australia) Syd Ball (Australia) John Cooper (Australia) Phil Dent
1 December	Madrid Pro Championships; Madrid, Spain; Carpet (i); Singles – Doubles	(Australia) Rod Laver; 6–3 6–2	(United Kingdom) Roger Taylor		
4 December	Queensland Hard Court Championships; Toowoomba, Australia; Singles – Doubles	(Australia) John Alexander; 13-11, 6-3	(Australia) Phil Dent		
26 Dec	Sugar Bowl International Championships; New Orleans, United States; Carpet (i)	(United States) Cliff Richey; 6–4, 6–4, 6–2	(United States) Jim Osborne	(United States) Gene Scott (United Kingdom) Peter Curtis	(United States) Armistead Neely (United States) Tom Mozur (United States) Roy Barth (United States) Steve Faulk

== See also ==
- 1969 ILTF Women's Tennis Circuit

== Sources ==
- MacCambridge, Michael (2012). Lamar Hunt: A Life in Sports. Andrews McMeel Publishing. ISBN 9781449423391.
- McCauley, Joe; Trabert, Tony; Collins, Bud (2000). The History of Professional Tennis. The Short Run Book Company Limited. Exeter. England.
- Mazak, Karoly (2017). The Concise History of Tennis. Independently published. ISBN 9781549746475.
- Robertson, Max (1974). Encyclopaedia of Tennis. Allen & Unwin. ISBN 9780047960420.
