= Senigallia Open =

Defunct tennis tournament
- Tour: ILTF World Circuit (1965–1970) men (1966–1972) women ILTF Grand Prix Circuit (1971) men ILTF Independent Circuit (1972–1973) men
- Founded: 1965; 61 years ago
- Abolished: 1973; 53 years ago
- Location: Senigallia, Italy
- Venue: Circolo Tennis Senigallia
- Surface: Clay / outdoor

The Senigallia Open was a men's and women's clay court tennis tournament founded in 1965. Also known as the Internazionali di Senigallia, or the City of Senigallia Silver Trophy (its official name) the tournament was played at the Circolo Tennis Senigallia, Senigallia, Italy until 1973.

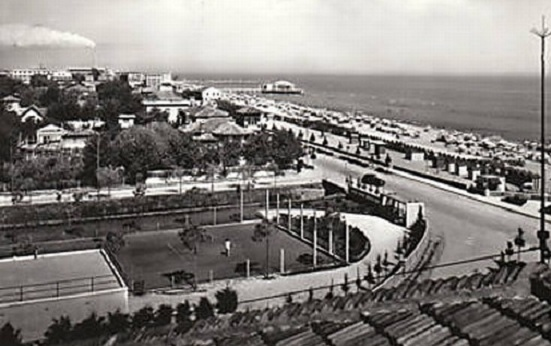
View of the Circolo Tennis Senigallia in the early 1960s. In the background, the Rotonda a mare.

== Finals ==
=== Men's singles ===
(incomplete roll)

Year	Winners	Runners-up	Score
↓ ILTF World Circuit ↓
1965	(Italy) Nicola Pietrangeli	(United States) Tom Edlefsen	6–4, 7–5, 6–3.
1966	(Italy) Giordano Maioli	(Socialist Federal Republic of Yugoslavia) Boro Jovanović	6–2, 6–4, 8–6.
1967	(Romania) Ion Țiriac	(Italy) Nicola Pietrangeli	4–6, 6–4, 1–6, 6–2, 6–4.
1968	(Australia) Martin Mulligan	(Romania) Ion Țiriac	6–4, 6–3, 6–2.
↓ Open era ↓
1969	(Australia) Martin Mulligan (2)	(Brazil) José Edison Mandarino	6–4, 6–4, 6–4.
↓ ILTF Independent Circuit ↓
1970	(Czechoslovakia) Jan Kukal	(Italy) Franco Bartoni	11–9, 6–3, 9–7.
↓ ILTF Grand Prix Circuit ↓
1971	(Italy) Adriano Panatta	(Australia) Martin Mulligan	6–3, 7–5, 6–1.
↓ ILTF Independent Circuit ↓
1972	(Italy) Ezio Di Matteo	(Czechoslovakia) František Pála	6–4, 6–4, 6–4.
1973	(Italy) Tonino Zugarelli	(Italy) Vincenzo Franchitti	2–6, 6–2, 6–3, 6–0.

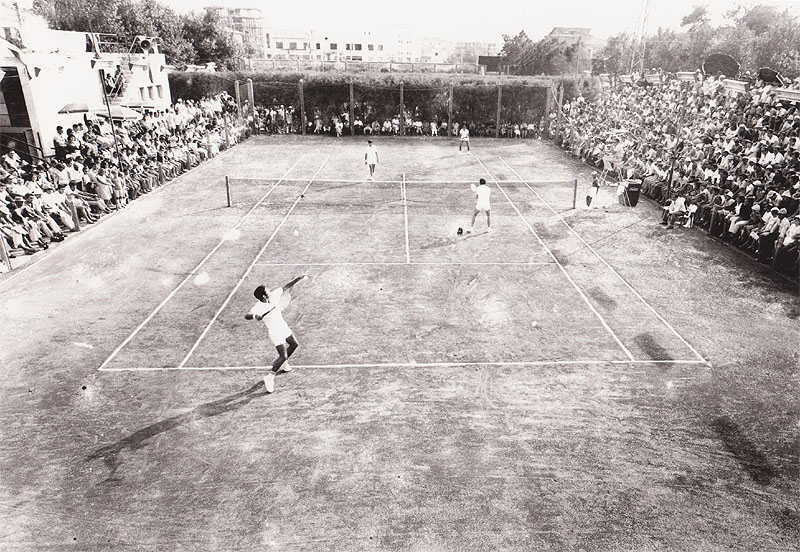
A doubles match at the Internazionali di Senigallia circa 1960s.

=== Women's singles ===
(incomplete roll)

Year	Winners	Runners-up	Score
↓ ILTF World Circuit ↓
1966	(Australia) Helen Gourlay	(Italy) Maria Teresa Riedl	6–4, 7–5
1967	(Australia) Helen Gourlay (2)	(Italy) Alessandra Gobbo	6–2, 6–2
1968	(Italy) Maria Teresa Riedl	(Sweden) Christina Sandberg	6–1, 6–2
↓ Open era ↓
1969	(Japan) Kazuko Sawamatsu	(Sweden) Christina Sandberg	6–3, 6–3
1970	(Australia) Lesley Hunt	(Uruguay) Fiorella Bonicelli	6–2, 6–1
1971	(Indonesia) Lany Kaligis	(Indonesia) Lita Liem	7–5, 3–6, 6–2
1972	(Australia) Patricia Coleman	(Romania) Virginia Ruzici	8–6, 6–2
Women's event not held

== Event name (Italian) ==
- Internazionali di Senigallia
- Trofeo Argento Città di Senigallia
- Torneo Open di Senigallia

== Sources ==
- it:Senigallia Open
