= Catania International Open =

Catania International Open Open Internazionale di Catania

Defunct tennis tournament
- Tour: ILTF Circuit
- Founded: 1959; 66 years ago
- Abolished: 1978; 47 years ago
- Location: Catania, Sicily, Italy
- Surface: Clay

The Catania International Open or Open Internazionale di Catania was a men's and women's international tennis tournament founded in 1959 as the Catania International or Internazionale di Catania and was played on outdoor clay courts in Catania, Sicily, Italy. The tournament was only held until 1978.

== History ==
The Catania International Open was a men's and women's international tennis tournament founded in 1959 as the Catania International and was played on outdoor clay courts in Catania, Sicily, Italy. The tournament was only held until 1978.

== Finals ==
=== Men's singles ===
(incomplete roll)

Year	Champion	Runner-up	Score
1959	(Italy) Nicola Pietrangeli	(Italy) Giuseppe Merlo	6–4, 6–2, 6–0
1964	(Australia) Fred Stolle	(South Africa) Bob Hewitt	6–3, 7–5, 2–6, 8–6
1965	(Australia) Martin Mulligan	(Brazil) José Edison Mandarino	6–2, 6–3, 6–1
1966	(United States) Marty Riessen	(Romania) Ion Țiriac	6–4, 6–8, 6–2, 6-4
1967	(Australia) Martin Mulligan (2)	(Italy) Nicola Pietrangeli	6–3, 6–1, 6–2
Open era
1968	(Australia) Martin Mulligan (3)	(Romania) Ion Țiriac	8–6, 6–4, 6–3
1969	(United Kingdom) Graham Stilwell	(Hungary) István Gulyás	6–4, 6–3, 4–6, 6-3
1970	(Romania) Ion Țiriac	(Hungary) István Gulyás	6–3, 6–3, 6–3
1971	(Czechoslovakia) Jan Kodeš	(France) Georges Goven	6–3, 6–0, 6–2
1972	(Italy) Paolo Bertolucci	(Australia) Martin Mulligan	6–4, 6–4, 7–6

=== Men's doubles ===
Year	Champion	Runner-up	Score
1971	(France) Pierre Barthès (France) François Jauffret	(Czechoslovakia) Jan Kodeš (Czechoslovakia) Jan Kukal	6–4, 3–6, 6–3

=== Women's singles ===
(incomplete roll)

Year	Champion	Runner-up	Score
1959	(South Africa) Sandra Reynolds	(Mexico) Yola Ramírez	6–1, 8–6
1964	(Australia) Madonna Schacht	(Czechoslovakia) Vlasta Kodesova	6–3, 6–4
1965	(West Germany) Helga Niessen	(Australia) Madonna Schacht	6–1, 7–5
1966	(West Germany) Helga Niessen (2)	(Sweden) Ulla Sandulf	6–1, 6–1
1967	(Australia) Lesley Turner	(Soviet Union) Galina Baksheeva	6–4, 6–4
Open era
1968	(Australia) Helen Gourlay	(Romania) Judith Dibar	6–3, 6–3
1969	(Italy) Maria Nasuelli	(Ecuador) Maria Guzmán	6–1, 6–2
1970	(Sweden) Christina Sandberg	(United States) Pam Austin	6–3, 6–0
1971	(United Kingdom) Virginia Wade	(France) Gail Sherriff Chanfreau	1–6, 7–6, 6–2
1972	(Italy) Evelyne Terras Papale	(Italy) Rosalba Vido	6–2, 6–1
1978	(Sweden) Elisabeth Ekblom	(Australia) Dianne Evers	5–7, 6–2, 6–1

=== Women's doubles ===
Year	Champion	Runner-up	Score
1971	(France) Gail Sherriff Chanfreau (France) Helga Schultze	(United States) Pam Teeguarden (United Kingdom) Virginia Wade	6-4, 6-4
