= Moroccan International Championships =

Moroccan International Championships Championnats Internationaux Marocains

Defunct tennis tournament
- Tour: ILTF Circuit (1924-1974)
- Founded: 1924; 101 years ago
- Abolished: 1974; 51 years ago
- Location: Morocco
- Surface: Clay

The Moroccan International Championships or Championnats Internationaux Marocains was a men's and women's international clay court tennis tournament founded in 1925 as the Moroccan Championships or Championnats du Maroc. The tournament first held in Casablanca, Morocco. It was held annually until 1974 when it was discontinued as part of the worldwide ILTF Circuit.

== History ==
In 1924 the Moroccan Championships were first held in Casablanca, Morocco. The tournament continued to staged annually through to the second world war then was suspended. In 1950 the tournament resumed under a new brand name the Moroccan International Championships. The tournament was mainly held in Casablanca, but was also staged in Rabat in 1933, 1937, 1939 and 1950. The championships ran annually through till 1974 when they were discontinued as part of the worldwide ILTF Circuit.

== Finals ==
=== Men's singles ===
Notes: two versions of the tournament was held in * February (59) & April (62) ** November (59, 62).

(Incomplete roll)

Moroccan Championships
| 1930 | (France) Christian Boussus | (France) Maxime "Max" Combemale | 6-2 6-3 |
| 1936 | (France) Christian Boussus | (France) Jean Lesueur | 6-4, 6–0, 6-2 |
| 1937 | (France) Christian Boussus | (Sweden) Kalle Schröder | 4-6 6-3 6-4 6-8 6-2 |
| 1939 | (France) Mr. Lasson | (Sweden) Kalle Schröder | 7-5 6-2 6-0 |
| 1940/1945 | Not held (due to World War II) | | |
Moroccan International Championships
| 1950 | (Australia) Geoffrey Brown | (United States) Fred Kovaleski | 5-7 6-1 6-4 |
| 1951 | (France) Paul Rémy | (France) Maurice Bendayan | 6-2 6-0 7-5 |
| 1956 | (France) Henri Chabance | (Morocco) Pierre Forget | 8-6 6-4 6-2 |
| 1957 | (Morocco) Pierre Forget | (France) Jean Pierre Bergerat | 6-3 3-6 6-2 10-8 |
| 1959* | (United Kingdom) Mike Davies | (France) Robert Haillet | 6-3 1-6 7-5 |
| 1959** | (Italy) Nicola Pietrangeli | (France) Gérard Pilet | 6-4 6-3 6-4 |
| 1960 | (Spain) Manuel Santana | (Italy) Giuseppe Merlo | 1-6 6-4 6-4 6-4 |
| 1961 | (West Germany) Wilhelm Bungert | (Socialist Federal Republic of Yugoslavia) Boro Jovanović | 7-5 2-6 6-3 3-6 6-2 |
| 1962* | (Hungary) István Gulyás | (West Germany) Ingo Buding | 10-8 6-4 6-2 |
| 1962** | (Morocco) Lahcen Chadli | (Morocco) Mohammed-Haibabi Bouchaib | 6-1 6-0 6-2 |
| 1963 | (Australia) Roy Emerson | (West Germany) Ingo Buding | 6-8 7-5 6-3 6-4 |
| 1964 | (Australia) Martin Mulligan | (Hungary) István Gulyás | 6-4 6-2 6-3 |
| 1965 | (Morocco) Ben Ali Ahmed | (Morocco) Ali Laroussi | 1-6 6-4 7-5 4-6 7-5 |
| 1968 | (Greece) Nicholas Kalogeropoulos | (Australia) Allan Stone | 6-1 4-6 6-3 6-4 |
| 1968 | (France) Michel Leclercq | (France) Daniel Contet | 2-6 7-5 6-2 |
Open era
| 1969 | (Socialist Federal Republic of Yugoslavia) Željko Franulović | (Australia) Barry Phillips-Moore | 2-6 6-1 6-2 6-3 |
| 1970 | (West Germany) Hans-Jürgen Pohmann | (Morocco) Ali Laroussi | 6-3 6-4 6-2 |
| 1971 | (Romania) Ion Țiriac | (France) François Jauffret | 7-6 6-0 6-3 |
| 1974 | (France) Éric Deblicker | (France) Jean-Claude Barclay | 7-5 6-1 6-3 |

=== Women's singles ===
(Incomplete roll)

Moroccan Championships
| 1925 | (French Protectorate in Morocco) Mme Neville | (French Protectorate in Morocco) Mme Rebourseau | 6-1, 3–6, 6-1 |
| 1933 | (French Protectorate in Morocco) Mlle Matia | (French Protectorate in Morocco) Mme Lannefranque | 6-2, 6-1 |
| 1939 | (French Protectorate in Morocco) Mme Follweider | (French Protectorate in Morocco) Mme Lannefranque | 6-4, 6-2 |
| 1940/1945 | Not held (due to World War II) | | |
Moroccan International Championships
| 1951 | (Switzerland) Ruth Nathan Kaufmann | (French Protectorate in Morocco) Mlle Pilon Fleury | 6-3, 3–6, 8-6 |
| 1954 | (France) Maud Galtier | (France) Michelle Bourbonnais | 6-3, 6-2 |
| 1956 | (Morocco) Jacqueline Morales | (French Protectorate in Morocco) Mlle Roy | 6-1, 6-1 |
| 1959 | (France) Márta Popp | (Morocco) Jacqueline Morales | 5-7, 6–2, 6-3 |
| 1960 | (United Kingdom) Ann Haydon | (France) Jacqueline Rees-Lewis | 6-0, 6-2 |
| 1961 | (Italy) Silvana Lazzarino | (West Germany) Helga Schultze | 6-2, 6-3 |
| 1962 | (Italy) Lea Pericoli | (Italy) Silvana Lazzarino | 10-8, 3–6, 6-1 |
| 1963 | (Australia) Jan Lehane | (Brazil) Maria Bueno | 6-3, 6-2 |
| 1964 | (France) Françoise Dürr | (Australia) Robyn Ebbern | 6-4, 6-3 |
| 1968 | (Australia) Gail Sherriff | (United States) Alice Tym | 6-1, 6-4 |
Open era
| 1969 | (United States) Alice Tym | (Argentina) Graciela Morán | 6-3, 6-1 |
| 1970 | (France) Jacqueline Morales Lecaillon (2) | (Australia) Jenny Staley Hoad | 3-6, 7–5, 6-0 |
| 1971 | (Australia) Wendy Gilchrist | (Belgium) Michèle Gurdal | 6-2, 7-5 |

== See also ==
- Grand Prix Hassan II (ATP successor tournament)
- Morocco Open (WTA successor tournament)
- Category:National and multi-national tennis tournaments
