= Travemünde Challenger =

Travemünde International ATP Travemünde Challenger

Defunct tennis tournament
- Tour: ILTF World Circuit
- Founded: 1951; 74 years ago
- Abolished: 1988; 37 years ago
- Location: Travemünde, West Germany
- Venue: Travemünde Hockey & Tennis Club
- Surface: Clay / outdoor

The Travemünde Challenger also known as the ATP Travemünde Challenger was a men's tennis tournament founded in 1951 as a combined men's and women's clay court tennis tournament called the Travemünde International. The tournament ran annually until 1988 when it was discontinued.

== History ==
In 1908 the Rasentennisturnier Travemünde (Travemünde Lawn Tennis Tournament) was first established. That tournament was an open clay court event for men and women that mainly attracted German tennis players, though some foreign international players did participate in the tournament. In 1922 the Harvesterhuder Tennis and Hockey Club then organized the event now branded as the Internationales Rasentennisturnier Travemünde in Travemünde and built the first tennis facility with a clubhouse on behalf of the city. In 1947 the Travemünde Hockey & Tennis Club was founded.

In 1950 the Rasentennisturnier Travemünde was succeeded a new Travemünde International tournament in 1951. The tournament ran as a combined event until 1980 when the women's tournament was discontinued. The men's event carried but it was downgraded from the world tour and became a challenger tournament in 1981 called the Travemünde Challenger it continued until 1988, when the Travemünde Hockey & Tennis Club ended the event due to financial problems with cost of hosting tournament.

== Finals ==
=== Men's singles ===
(Incomplete roll)

| Year | Winners | Runners-up | Score |
|---|---|---|---|
↓ ILTF World Circuit ↓
| 1951 | (Sweden) Nils Rohlsson | (West Germany) Herbert Ludwig Tübben | 6–1, 6–1 |
| 1952 | (Italy) Umberto Bergamo | (Italy) Gianni Clerici | 6–3, 6–4 |
| 1953 | (Sweden) Jan-Erik Lundqvist | (Czechoslovakia) Milan Matouš | 6–4, 2–6, 6–2 |
| 1954 | (Switzerland) Erwin Balestra | (Italy) Mario Belardinelli | 5–7, 6–4, 6–2 |
| 1955 | (United States) Wayne Van Voorhees | (United Kingdom) Tony Mottram | 6–2, 1–6, 6–2 |
| 1956 | (Australia) Ken Rosewall | (Austria) Ladislav Legenstein | 8–6, 3–6, 6–0 |
| 1957 | (Hungary) Istvan Sikorski | (South Africa) Abe Segal | 6–2, 6–2 |
| 1958 | (Australia) Mervyn Rose | (Sweden) Sven Davidson | 7–5, 6–1 |
| 1959 | (Sweden) Jan-Erik Lundqvist (2) | (Chile) Luis Ayala | 11–9, 6–3 |
| 1960 | (Sweden) Jan-Erik Lundqvist (3) | (India) Ramanathan Krishnan | 7–5, 6–1 |
| 1961 | (South Africa) Robin Sanders | (Socialist Federal Republic of Yugoslavia) Milan Branović | 6–4, 1–6, 6–3 |
| 1962 | (West Germany) Wolfgang Stuck | (Austria) Ladislav Legenstein | 6–4, 6–1 |
| 1963 | (Socialist Federal Republic of Yugoslavia) Niki Pilic | (West Germany) Wolfgang Stuck | 6–2, 4–6, 9–7, 6–1 |
| 1964 | (Australia) Martin Mulligan | (United States) Gene Scott | 11–9, 4–6, 5–7, 6–0, 6–1 |
| 1965 | (West Germany) Wolfgang Stuck (2) | (West Germany) Ingo Buding | 7–5, 6–3, 6–3 |
| 1966 | (Socialist Federal Republic of Yugoslavia) Niki Pilic (2) | (Italy) Sergio Tacchini | 6–2, 6–3, 6–2 |
| 1967 | (Romania) Ilie Năstase | (Denmark) Jan Leschly | 6–4, 6–3, 6–2 |
| 1968 | (Czechoslovakia) Jan Kukal | (Romania) Ion Țiriac | 1–6, 6–3, 6–4, 4–6, 11–9 |
↓ Open era ↓
| 1969 | (Romania) Ilie Năstase (2) | (Hungary) Istvan Gulyas | 6–2, 7–5, 1–6, 2–6, 6–4 |
↓ ILTF Independent Circuit ↓
| 1970 | (West Germany) Attila Korpás | (Australia) Barry Phillips-Moore | 6–4, 6–4, 6–1 |
| 1971 | (West Germany) Harald Elschenbroich | (West Germany) Karl Meiler | 7–9, 3–6, 6–0, 7–5, 6–3 |
| 1972 | (Hungary) Péter Szőke | (Australia) Dick Crealy | 6–1, 6–2 |
| 1973 | (Japan) Toshiro Sakai | (Hungary) Robert Machan | 6–3, 4–6, 6–0, 7–6 |
| 1974 | (Hungary) Robert Machan | (Japan) Toshiro Sakai | 6–2, 6–1, 6–2 |
| 1975 | (Czechoslovakia) Jan Kukal (2) | (Hungary) Péter Szőke | 7–6, 3–6, 5–7, 7–6, 7–6 |
| 1976 | (Austria) Hans Kary | (Hungary) Robert Machan | 6–3, 4–6, 7–6, 6–7, 6–2 |
| 1977 | (Hungary) Balazs Taroczy | (Hungary) Robert Machan | 6–0, 6–2, 6–2 |
| 1978 | (Sweden) Birger Andersson | (Czechoslovakia) Pavel Sevcik | 6–2, 6–4, 6–2 |
| 1979 | (United Kingdom) Buster Mottram | (Australia) Peter McNamara | 6–1, 6–3 |
| 1980 | (Israel) Steve Krulevitz | (Hungary) Robert Machan | 6–1, 7–5 |
↓ ATP Challenger Tour ↓
| 1981 | (West Germany) Ulrich Pinner | (West Germany) Peter Elter | 6–4, 4–6, 6–3 |
| 1982 | (France) Dominique Bedel | (West Germany) Wolfgang Popp | 6–4, 6–4 |
| 1983 | (West Germany) Michael Westphal | (West Germany) Rolf Gehring | 7–5, 6–2 |
| 1984 | (Soviet Union) Vadim Borisov | (Argentina) Alejandro Ganzábal | 7–5, 7–5 |
| 1986 | (West Germany) Alex Stepanek | (Italy) Massimo Cierro | 6–4, 3–6, 6–4 |
| 1987 | (Sweden) Ronnie Bathman | (Poland) Wojtek Kowalski | 7–6, 6–3 |
| 1988 | (Sweden) Conny Falk | (United States) Hugo Armando | 6–4, 6–4 |

=== Women's singles ===
(Incomplete roll)

| Year | Winners | Runners-up | Score |
|---|---|---|---|
↓ ILTF World Circuit ↓
| 1951 | (Argentina) Mary Terán de Weiss | (West Germany) Erika Vollmer | 6–3, 7–5 |
| 1952 | (United States) Dottie Head Knode | (Brazil) Ingrid Metzner | 6–4, 6–4 |
| 1953 | (United States) Dottie Head Knode (2) | (Czechoslovakia) Helena Matouš | 6–2, 6–2 |
| 1954 | (West Germany) Edda Buding | (West Germany) Inge Hoffert Buderus | 6–2, 5–1, ret. |
| 1956 | (Brazil) Ingrid Metzner | (West Germany) Elizabeth von Aspern | 6–3, 6–2 |
| 1958 | (West Germany) Erika Vollmer | (West Germany) Karin Warnke | 6–2, 7–5 |
| 1966 | (West Germany) Helga Niessen | (Austria) Sonja Pachta | 8–6, 6–0 |
| 1967 | (West Germany) Helga Schultze | (West Germany) Helga Niessen | 4–6, 7–5, 6–3 |
| 1968 | (Australia) Gail Sherriff | (Czechoslovakia) Alena Palmeova | 6–4, 6–4 |
↓ Open era ↓
| 1969 | (West Germany) Helga Niessen (2) | (West Germany) Kora Schediwy | 7–5, 6–2 |
| 1970 | (Hungary) Erzsebet Polgar | (Hungary) Katalin Borka | 6–4, 4–6, 6–4 |
| 1971 | (West Germany) Helga Niessen Masthoff (3) | (Finland) Birgitta Lindström | 6–8, 6–2, 6–2 |
| 1972 | (West Germany) Helga Niessen Masthoff (4) | (Hungary) Judith Szorenyi | 6–2, 6–2 |
↓ ILTF Independent Circuit ↓
| 1973 | (West Germany) Helga Niessen Masthoff (5) | (Japan) Kazuko Sawamatsu | 6–4, 6–3 |
| 1974 | (West Germany) Helga Niessen Masthoff (6) | (West Germany) Heide Orth | 6–4, 6–2 |
| 1975 | (West Germany) Helga Niessen Masthoff (7) | (Czechoslovakia) Alena Palmeová-West | 6–4, 6–4 |
| 1976 | (West Germany) Helga Niessen Masthoff (8) | (West Germany) Katja Ebbinghaus | 6–2, 6–2 |
| 1977 | (West Germany) Katja Ebbinghaus | (Sweden) Helena Anliot | 7–5, 6–3 |
| 1980 | (West Germany) Helga Niessen Masthoff (9) | (West Germany) Claudia Kohde-Kilsch | 4–6, 6–3, 6–2 |
