= Phoenix Thunderbird Open (tennis) =

Defunct Grand Prix tournament (1953 to 1970)

Defunct tennis tournament
- Tour: ILTF (1952–69); Grand Prix Circuit (1970)
- Founded: 1952
- Abolished: 1970
- Editions: 18
- Location: Phoenix, United States
- Venue: Phoenix Country Club
- Surface: Hard / indoor (1952–65); Hard / outdoor (1966–70)

The Phoenix Thunderbird Open was a combined men's and women's tennis tournament founded in 1952 as Phoenix Thunderbird Championships Invitational. Also known as the Phoenix Thunderbird Invitational it continued as a joint event until 1970 when the men's event was discontinued. In 1971 the women's tournament was re branded as the Virginia Slims Thunderbird Classic that event continued until 1980.

The tournament was part of the ILTF North America Circuit a regional sub circuit of the ILTF World Circuit from 1952 to 1969. In 1970 it became Grand Prix Circuit for that year only.

== History ==
The tournament was founded in 1952, as the Phoenix Thunderbird Championships a joint men's and women's tennis tournament played at the Phoenix Country Club, Phoenix, Arizona, United States. In 1953 the word 'championships' was dropped from the tournaments title becoming the Phoenix Thunderbird Invitational. In 1969 the tournament went open under the brand name the Thunderbird Invitational. In 1970 the tournament was rebranded as the Phoenix Thunderbird Open, and was the final year as a combined event when the men's tournament was discontinued. In 1971 women's event became part of the Virginia Slims Circuit and was known as the Virginia Slims Thunderbird Classic, that event carried on till 1980 when it was last known as the Thunderbird Classic before it too was abolished. The tournament was originally played on indoor hard courts from 1953 to 1965, then outdoor hard courts from 1966 to 1970. The event was originally played at the end February annually, then moved to mid to late March. It was only in 1970 that its scheduling was moved to October that year, however the women's event carried on with the new dates.

== Finals ==
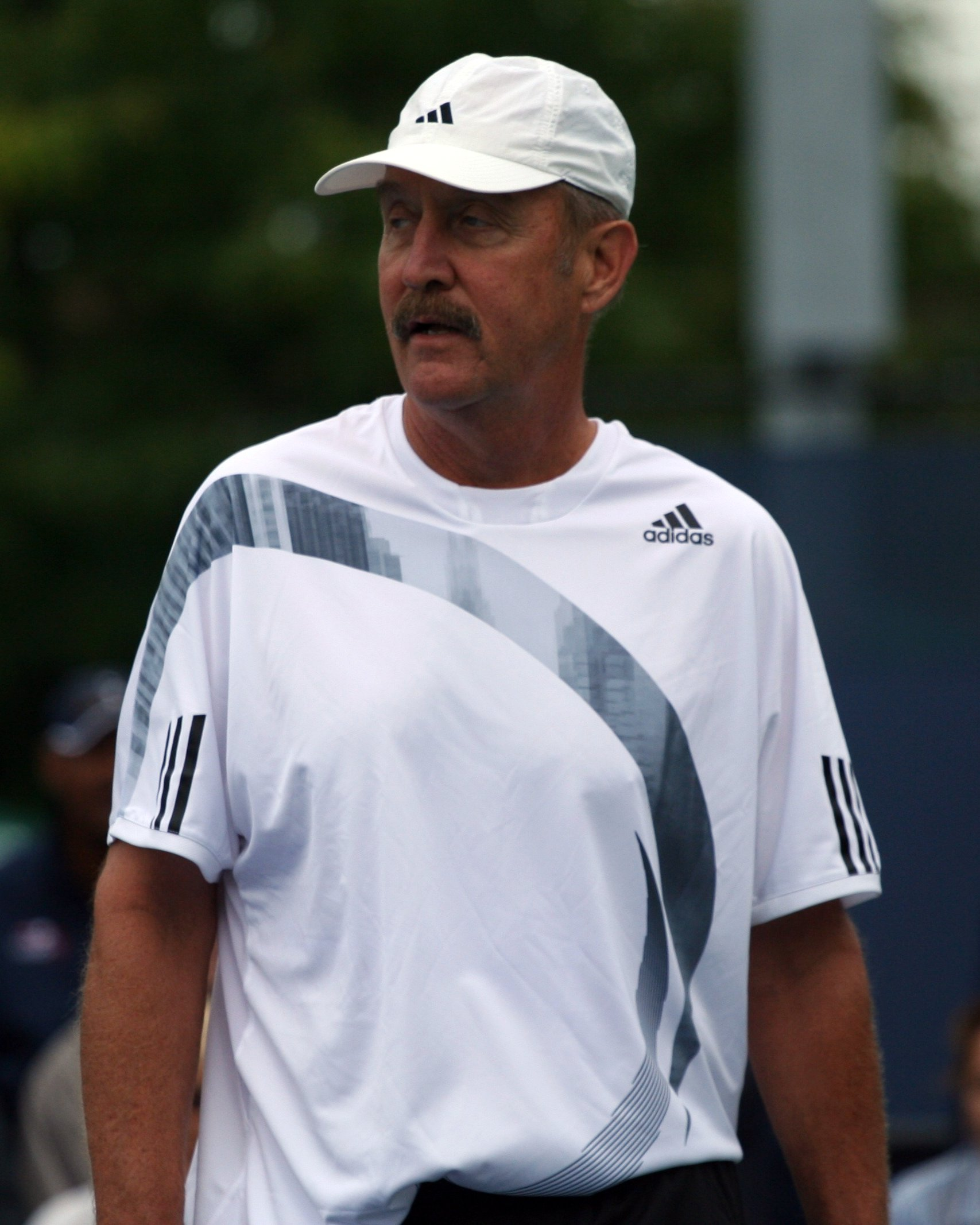
Stan Smith in 2009, won 3 T.Bird singles titles.

=== Singles ===
Included:

Year	Champions	Runners-up	Score
Phoenix Thunderbird Championships
1952	(United States) Tony Trabert	(United States) Bob Perry	6–1, 6–2, 8–6
Phoenix Thunderbird Invitational
1953	(United States) Tony Trabert	(United States) Bob Perry	6–1, 6–2, 8–6
1954	(United States) Arthur Larsen	(United States) Tom Brown	6–2, 6–4, 6–2
1955	(United States) Arthur Larsen (2)	(United States) Herbert Flam	6–4, 6–1
1956	(United States) Tom Brown	(United States) Gardnar Mulloy	6–4, 8–6
1957	(Peru) Alex Olmedo	(United States) Noel Brown	6–3, 6–2
1958	(United States) Gilbert Shea	(United States) Myron Franks	7–5, 11–9
1959	(United States) Hugh Stewart	(United States) Tom Brown	3–6, 6–4, 6–4
1960	(United States) Tom Brown (2)	(United States) Whitney Reed	4–6, 6–4, 6–2
1961	(United States) Whitney Reed	(United States) Jon Douglas	6–4, 6–3
Phoenix Thunderbird Invitation
1962	(United States) Tut Bartzen	(United States) Allen Fox	6–4,6–4
1963	(United States) Charlie Pasarell	(United States) Allen Fox	2–6, 6–3, 6–2
1964	(United States) Charlie Pasarell (2)	(United States) Dennis Ralston	6–3, 3–6, 6–4
1965	(United States) Chuck McKinley	(United States) Arthur Ashe	8–10, 6–4, 10–8
1966	(United States) Arthur Ashe	(United States) Jim Osborne	3–6, 6–3, 6–2
1967	(United States) Stan Smith	(United States) Allen Fox	7–5, 6–3
1968	(United States) Stan Smith (2)	(United States) Bob Lutz	4–6, 6–2, 6–1
↓ Open Era ↓
1969	(United States) Cliff Richey	(Spain) Manuel Santana	6–4, 6–4
Phoenix Thunderbird Open
1970	(United States) Stan Smith (3)	(United States) Jim Osborne	6–3, 6–7, 6–1

=== Doubles ===
Year	Champions	Runners-up	Score
1970	(Australia) Dick Crealy (Australia) Ray Ruffels	(Czech Republic) Jan Kodeš (United States) Charlie Pasarell	7–6, 6–3

== See also ==
- Arizona Tennis Classic (successor men's event)
- Thunderbird Classic (the women's event)
- Virginia Slims of Arizona (another women's event in Arizona)

== Sources ==
- ATP Results Archive
