= San Joaquin Challenge Cup =

Defunct tennis tournament
- Tour: ILTF World Circuit (1951–72); ILTF Independent Tour (1973–75)
- Founded: 1951; 74 years ago
- Abolished: 1978; 47 years ago
- Location: Palo Alto, California United States; Stockton, California, United States
- Venue: Oak Park Tennis Center
- Surface: Hard (outdoors)

The San Joaquin Challenge Cup also called the Stockton Challenge Cup. was a men's and women's hard court tennis tournament founded in 1951. The tournament was organised by the Stockton Parks & Recreation Department in association with the Northern California Tennis Association and was played on outdoor hard courts at the Oak Park Tennis Center, Stockton, California, United States until 1978.

The event were part ILTF North America Circuit a sub circuit of the ILTF World Circuit until 1972 then became part of the ILTF Independent Tour until it was downgraded from the senior worldwide circuit.

== History ==
In 1951 the San Joaquin Challenge Cup its official name, also known as the Stockton Challenge Cup was established at Stockton, California United States. In 1957 the edition was played in Stockton up to the semi finals stage in that location, but then the scheduled finals were delayed by three weeks and were played in Palo Alto. The tournament was organised by the Stockton Parks & Recreation Department and approved as an vent by the Northern California Tennis Association, and was played on outdoor hard courts at the Oak Park Tennis Center, Stockton, California, United States until 1978. The tournament ceased to be part of the senior ILTF North America Circuit in 1978, however the event in one form or another was still being held up to 2018 as the Stockton Challenge Cup Open.

== Finals ==
=== Men's singles ===
(incomplete roll)

| Year | Location | Winners | Runners-up | Score |
|---|---|---|---|---|
↓ ILTF World Circuit ↓
| 1955 | Stockton | (United States) Tom Brown | (United States) Fred Hagist | 6–1, 5–7, 6–4. |
| 1957 | Palo Alto | (United States) Tom Brown (2) | (United States) Jack Frost | 6–4, 6–3. |
| 1958 | Stockton | (United States) Whitney Reed | (United States) Christopher Crawford | 2–6, 6–3, 6–0. |
| 1960 | Stockton | (United States) Butch Krikorian | (United States) Bill Hoogs Jr. | 6–2, 6–4. |
| 1962 | Stockton | (United States) Bill Hepner | (United States) William "Bill" G. Demas | 8–10, 6–3, 6–4. |
| 1964 | Stockton | (United States) Jim McManus | (United States) Dean Penero | 7–5, 6–4. |
| 1965 | Stockton | (United States) Eugene Cantin | (United States) Jim McManus | 1–6, 6–4, 6–2 |
| 1966 | Stockton | (United States) Eugene Cantin (2) | (United States) Larry Riggs | 6–3, 6–3. |
| 1967 | Stockton | (United States) Tom Kiss | (United States) Tom Muench | 6–2, 7–5. |
| 1968 | Stockton | (United States) Eugene Cantin (3) | (United States) Roger Cooper | 6–3, 6–2. |
↓ Open era ↓
| 1969 | Stockton | (France) Jean-Loup Rouyer | (United States) Eugene Cantin | 11–9, 6–3. |
| 1970 | Stockton | (Mexico) Marcelo Lara | (United States) Eugene Cantin | 6–8, 6–4, 6–3. |
| 1971 | Stockton | (Mexico) Joaquín Loyo-Mayo | (Peru) Alex Olmedo | 8–6, 5–7, 8–6. |
| 1973 | Stockton | (France) Robyn Ray | (United States) Bob Potthast | 3–6, 6–4, 7–6. |
↓ ILTF Independent Tour ↓
| 1978 | Stockton | (United States) Dick Metz | (United States) Bill Harper | 7–6, 5/1, 6–4. |
For the successor event see Stockton Challenger

=== Women's singles ===
(incomplete roll)

| Year | Location | Winners | Runners-up | Score |
|---|---|---|---|---|
↓ ILTF World Circuit ↓
| 1955 | Stockton | (United States) Mary Ann Mitchell | (United States) Gertrude Easton | 6–4, 6–0 |
| 1967 | Stockton | (United States) Susan Anawalt | (United States) Marlene Muench | 6–2, 6–4 |
↓ Open era ↓
| 1970 | Stockton | (United States) Sharon Walsh | (United States) Barbara Downs | 6–2, 6–3 |
| 1971 | Stockton | (United States) Tory Ann Fretz | (Australia) Karen Krantzcke | 6–3, 5–7, 6–3 |
| 1973 | Stockton | (United States) Kate Latham | (United States) Cathy Anderson | 6–4, 6–2 |
For the successor event see Stockton Challenger
