= Lany Kaligis =

Indonesian tennis player

- Country (sports): Indonesia
- Born: 22 April 1949 (age 76)
- Retired: 1976

Singles
- Career titles: 4 ITF

Grand Slam singles results
- Australian Open: 3R (1968, 1970)
- French Open: 2R (1969)
- Wimbledon: 2R (1973, 1975)
- US Open: 1R (1970, 1971)

Doubles
- Career titles: 11 ITF

Grand Slam doubles results
- Australian Open: QF (1970)
- French Open: 3R (1970)
- Wimbledon: QF (1971)
- US Open: 1R (1971)

Grand Slam mixed doubles results
- Australian Open: 1R (1968)
- French Open: –
- Wimbledon: –
- US Open: 1R (1971)
Medal record
Women's Tennis
Representing Indonesia
Asian Games
| Gold medal – first place | 1966 Bangkok | Singles |
| Gold medal – first place | 1966 Bangkok | Doubles |
| Gold medal – first place | 1966 Bangkok | Team |
| Bronze medal – third place | 1966 Bangkok | Mixed Doubles |
| Bronze medal – third place | 1974 Tehran | Singles |
SEA Games
| Gold medal – first place | 1977 Kuala Lumpur | Team |
- Last updated on: 30 April 2009.

Lany Kaligis (born 22 April 1949), sometimes known as Lany Lumanauw, is a former Indonesian professional tennis player. She played at Grand Slam events between 1968 and 1975, in women's singles, women's doubles and mixed doubles.

In women's doubles, she and partner Lita Liem Sugiarto reached two Grand Slam quarterfinals: the Australian Open in 1970 and Wimbledon in 1971. As such, she and Liem were among the first Indonesians to reach the later rounds of a Grand Slam competition. In singles, her best results were her third round exits from the Australian Championships in 1968 and the Australian Open in 1970.

She enjoyed some success at the Asian Games. At the 1966 Asian Games at Bangkok, she won the gold medal in the women's singles, the gold medal in the women's doubles with Lita Liem, the bronze medal in the mixed doubles with Soen Houw Goto. She also won the bronze medal in the women's singles at the 1974 Asian Games in Tehran.

Kaligis was also a regular representative of Indonesia in the Fed Cup, playing in 1969, 1970, 1973, 1974 and 1975.

== ITF finals ==
Legend
$25,000 tournaments
$10,000 tournaments

=== Singles (4–2) ===
| Result | No. | Date | Tournament | Surface | Opponent | Score |
|---|---|---|---|---|---|---|
| Loss | 1. | 11 September 1967 | Kuala Lumpur, Malaysia | Hard | (Indonesia) Lita Liem Sugiarto | 2–6, 6–4, 5–7 |
| Loss | 2. | 5 January 1969 | Sydney, Australia | Hard | (France) Gail Chanfreau | 0–6, 0–6 |
| Win | 3. | 29 October 1972 | Jakarta, Indonesia | Hard | (Indonesia) Lita Liem Sugiarto | 7–5, 5–7, 7–5 |
| Win | 4. | 21 April 1974 | Kuala Lumpur, Malaysia | Hard | (Indonesia) Lita Liem Sugiarto | 7–5, 3–6, 6–3 |
| Win | 5. | 22 September 1974 | Colombo, Sri Lanka | Hard | (Indonesia) Lita Liem Sugiarto | 7–5, 1–6, 6–1 |
| Win | 6. | 21 April 1975 | Kuala Lumpur, Malaysia | Hard | (Indonesia) Lita Liem Sugiarto | 6–2, 6–4 |

=== Doubles (11–5) ===
| Result | No. | Date | Tournament | Surface | Partner | Opponents | Score |
|---|---|---|---|---|---|---|---|
| Loss | 1. | 20 April 1965 | Semarang, Indonesia | Hard | (Indonesia) Otty Oey | (Indonesia) Lita Liem Sugiarto (Indonesia) Mien Suhadi | 2–6, 2–6 |
| Loss | 2. | 1 July 1965 | Jakarta, Indonesia | Hard | (Indonesia) Vonny Djoa | (Indonesia) Lita Liem Sugiarto (Indonesia) Mien Suhadi | 1–6, 3–6 |
| Win | 3. | 11 September 1965 | Colombo, Sri Lanka | Clay | (Indonesia) Lita Liem Sugiarto | (India) Dechu Appaiah (Sri Lanka) Sriya Gooneratne | 6–2, 6–3 |
| Win | 4. | 6 August 1967 | Ostend, Belgium | Clay | (Indonesia) Lita Liem Sugiarto | (Belgium) Monique Bedoret (Belgium) Michele Kahn | 6–4, 1–6, 6–2 |
| Win | 5. | 11 September 1967 | Kuala Lumpur, Malaysia | Hard | (Indonesia) Lita Liem Sugiarto | (Indonesia) Mien Suhadi (Indonesia) Yolanda Soemarno | 6–2, 6–0 |
| Win | 6. | 15 September 1968 | Penang, Malaysia | Hard | (Indonesia) Lita Liem Sugiarto | (Indonesia) Loanita Rachman (Indonesia) Mien Suhadi | 6–3, 6–2 |
| Win | 7. | 1 March 1971 | Jakarta, Indonesia | Hard | (Indonesia) Lita Liem Sugiarto | (Netherlands) Trudy Groenman (Netherlands) Betty Stöve | 6–4, 4–6, 6–4 |
| Loss | 8. | 12 September 1971 | Kuala Lumpur, Malaysia | Hard | (Indonesia) Lita Liem Sugiarto | (New Zealand) Cecelie Fleming (South Korea) Lee Duk-hee | 4–6, 6–2, 5–7 |
| Win | 9. | 10 October 1971 | Hong Kong | Carpet | (Indonesia) Lita Liem Sugiarto | (New Zealand) Cecelie Fleming (Chinese Taipei) Chang Ching-ling | 6–2, 6–1 |
| Loss | 10. | 1 August 1972 | Hilversum, Netherlands | Clay | (Indonesia) Lita Liem Sugiarto | (Belgium) Michèle Gurdal (Netherlands) Betty Stöve | 4–6, 0–6 |
| Win | 11. | 18 September 1972 | Singapore, Singapore | Hard | (Indonesia) Lita Liem Sugiarto | (Japan) Hideko Goto (Japan) Kimiyo Hatanaka | 6–2, 6–1 |
| Loss | 12. | 13 May 1973 | Stuttgart, Germany | Clay | (Indonesia) Lita Liem Sugiarto | (Sweden) Christina Sandberg (Sweden) Mimmi Wikstedt | 6–7, 6–7 |
| Win | 13. | 21 April 1974 | Kuala Lumpur, Malaysia | Hard | (Indonesia) Lita Liem Sugiarto | (Australia) Lois Raymond (Australia) Gwen Stirton | 6–2, 5–7, 9–7 |
| Win | 14. | 30 June 1974 | Heerlen, Netherlands | Clay | (Indonesia) Lita Liem Sugiarto | (Spain) Carmen Perea (Spain) Silvia Blume | 6–3, 6–4 |
| Win | 15. | 22 September 1974 | Colombo, Sri Lanka | Hard | (Indonesia) Lita Liem Sugiarto | (India) Susan Das (India) Nirupama Mankad | 7–5, 1–6, 6–1 |
| Win | 16. | 21 April 1975 | Kuala Lumpur, Malaysia | Hard | (Indonesia) Lita Liem Sugiarto | (Australia) Lois Raymond (Australia) Gwen Stirton | 6–2, 4–6, 6–3 |

== Grand Slam performance timelines ==
Key
| W | F | SF | QF | #R | RR | Q# | DNQ | A | NH |

(W) winner; (F) finalist; (SF) semifinalist; (QF) quarterfinalist; (#R) rounds 4, 3, 2, 1; (RR) round-robin stage; (Q#) qualification round; (DNQ) did not qualify; (A) absent; (NH) not held; (SR) strike rate (events won / competed); (W–L) win–loss record.

=== Singles ===
| Tournament | 1968 | 1969 | 1970 | 1971 | 1972 | 1973 | 1974 | 1975 |
|---|---|---|---|---|---|---|---|---|
| Australian Open | 3R | 1R | 3R | A | A | A | A | A |
| French Open | A | 2R | LQ | 1R | LQ | 1R | 1R | 1R |
| Wimbledon | A | 1R | 1R | 1R | 1R | 2R | 1R | 2R |
| US Open | A | A | 1R | 1R | A | A | A | A |

=== Doubles ===
| Tournament | 1968 | 1969 | 1970 | 1971 | 1972 | 1973 | 1974 | 1975 |
|---|---|---|---|---|---|---|---|---|
| Australian Open | 2R | 1R | QF | A | A | A | A | A |
| French Open | A | 2R | 3R | 2R | 1R | 1R | 2R | A |
| Wimbledon | A | 2R | 2R | QF | 2R | 2R | 2R | 2R |
| US Open | A | A | 1R | A | A | A | A | A |

Kaligis's partner at all Grand Slam events was Lita Liem Sugiarto, except at Wimbledon in 1974, where she was partnered by Penny Moor of Great Britain.
