= Dewar Cup Aberavon =

Indoor tennis championship

Defunct tennis tournament
- Event name: Dewar Cup Aberavon (1968–73)
- Tour: Open (1968–71); Grand Prix circuit (1972–73)
- Founded: 1968
- Abolished: 1973
- Editions: 5
- Location: Aberavon, Wales
- Venue: Afan Lido
- Surface: Carpet / indoor

The Dewar Cup Aberavon was an indoor tennis event held from 1968 through 1973 and played at the Afan Lido Stadium in Aberavon, Wales as part of the Dewar Cup circuit of indoor tournaments held throughout the United Kingdom.

The Dewar Cup circuit—of which Aberavon was a stop—was used by John Dewar & Sons (the whisky company) not just for promotion but also as a marketing experiment: Dewar’s used printed branding and signage on court walls, balls, and player paraphernalia to test consumer engagement and brand recall in sports settings, effectively making it a branded “whisky-circuit.

== Finals ==
=== Men's singles ===
Year	Champions	Runners-up	Score
1968	(South Africa) Bob Hewitt	(Australia) Owen Davidson	8–6, 6–3
1969	(Australia) Lew Hoad	(South Africa) Bob Hewitt	9–7 6–1
1970	(United Kingdom) Gerald Battrick	(Czechoslovakia) Vladimir Zednik	6–1, 3–6, 6–1
1971	(South Africa) Bob Hewitt	(United Kingdom) Gerald Battrick	7–5, 6–4
1973	(United Kingdom) Mark Cox	(Australia) Owen Davidson	7–6, 6–2

=== Women's singles ===
Year	Champions	Runners-up	Score
1968	(Australia) Margaret Court	(United Kingdom) Virginia Wade	6–3, 4–6, 6–4
1969	(United Kingdom) Virginia Wade	(United States) Julie Heldman	6-4, 6-4
1970	(United Kingdom) Virginia Wade	(United Kingdom) Ann Haydon-Jones	6–3, 1–6, 7–5
1971	(United Kingdom) Virginia Wade	(Australia) Evonne Goolagong	7-6, 6-3
1973	(United Kingdom) Virginia Wade	(United States) Julie Heldman	6-3, 6-1

=== Women's doubles ===
Year	Champions	Runners-up	Score
1968	(Australia) Margaret Court (South Africa) Pat Walkden	(United States) Mary-Ann Eisel (United Kingdom) Winnie Shaw	6-2, 6-3
1969	(United Kingdom) Ann Haydon-Jones (United Kingdom) Virginia Wade	(United States) Mary-Ann Eisel (United States) Julie Heldman	6-3, 6-2
1970	(United Kingdom) Ann Haydon-Jones (United Kingdom) Virginia Wade	(France) Françoise Dürr (Netherlands) Betty Stöve	6-4, 6-3
1971	(France) Françoise Dürr (United Kingdom) Virginia Wade	(Australia) Evonne Goolagong (United States) Julie Heldman	7-5 6-4
1973	(United States) Marita Redondo (United Kingdom) Virginia Wade	(United States) Julie Heldman (United States) Ann Kiyomura	4–6, 6–3, 7–6
