= Heart of America Championships =

Defunct tennis tournament
- Tour: ILTF World Circuit
- Founded: 1939
- Abolished: 1973
- Location: Kansas City; United States
- Venue: Rockhill Tennis Club
- Surface: Clay / outdoor (1939-1953); Hard / outdoor (1954-1973)

The Heart of America Championships was a USLTA/ILTF affiliated combined men's and women's clay court then later hard court tennis tournament founded in 1939. Also known as the Heart of America International Championships it was played in Kansas City, Missouri, United States until 1973.

== History ==
Launched by the Missouri Valley Tennis Association in June 1939 the Heart of America tennis tournament was structured as a multi-divisional festival of tennis, combining grassroots competition with top-tier championship play.

Rather than being just a single men's or women's open draw, it operated as an all-encompassing regional showcase with multiple concurrent divisions.

The open division was the most prestigious event that attracted national and international talent. It served as a major stop on the United States Lawn Tennis Association (USLTA) circuit, offering ranking points and draw spots for top collegiate stars, touring amateurs, and visiting international players.

The tournament ran its final edition in September 1973. As international tennis restructured into unified commercial tour circuits, traditional regional tournaments like the Heart of America were gradually phased out.

== Past finals ==
=== Mens singles ===
(incomplete roll)

Year	Champion	Runner-Up	Score
1939	(United States) Frank Parker	(United States) Wayne Sabin	6–2, 8–6, 6–4
1940	(United States) Frank Parker (2)	(United States) Bobby Riggs	4–6, 6–1, 7–5, 7–5
1941	(United States) Bobby Riggs	(United States) Frank Parker	6–0, 7–5, 7–5
1946	(United States) Frank Parker (3)	(United States) Bill Talbert	3–6, 8–6, 6–3, 6–4
1947	(United States) Frank Parker (4)	(United States) Gardnar Mulloy	3–6, 6–2, 6–0
1948	(United States) Gardner Larned	(United States) Bud Behrens	6–3, 6–2, 6–2
1952	(United States) Tut Bartzen	(United States) Hal Surface	?
1962	(Brazil) Jose Edison Mandarino	(United States) Hank Jungle	6–8, 6–4, 6–4
1963	(South Africa) Cliff Drysdale	(Canada) François Godbout	6–8, 6–1, 6–4, 6–1
1964	(South Africa) Cliff Drysdale (2)	(India) Premjit Lall	6–2, 7–5, 6–4
1965	(United States) Donald Dell	(United States) John Powless	6–1, 6–1, 6–1
1966	(Canada) Keith Carpenter	(United States) John Powless	9–7, 6–3, 2–6, 4–6, 6–4
1967	(United States) Marty Riessen	(United Kingdom) Peter Curtis	6–2, 6–1, 6–2
1968	(United States) Jim Parker	(West Germany) Ingo Buding	6–8, 3–6, 6–0, 6–4, 6–4
1969	(United Kingdom) Gerald Battrick	(Australia) Bill Bowrey	6–3, 6–4
1970	(United States) Frank Froehling	(Australia) Terry Addison	divided title
1971	(United States) Richard Reilly	(United States) Dave Phillips	6–3, 4–6, red.
1972	(United States) Bill De Baun	(United States) Van Thompson	6–2, 3–6, 6–3
1973	(Nigeria) David Imonitie	(United States) Van Thompson	6–7, 6–2, 6–2

=== Womens singles ===
(incomplete roll)

Year	Champion	Runner-Up	Score
1939	(United States) Bertha Thompson	(United States) Frances Jacobson	6–1, 6–2
1940	(United States) Virginia Wolfenden	(United Kingdom) Mary Hardwick	6–0, 6–2
1941	(United States) Dorothy Bundy	(United States) Pauline Betz	6–2, 2–6, 6–3
1946	(United States) Virginia Kovacs	(United States) Mary Arnold Prentiss	11–9, 6–3
1947	(United States) Baba Lewis	(United States) Laura Lou Jahn	6–0, 6–1
1948	(Romania) Magda Rurac	(United States) Marta Barnett Andrade	6–0, 6–8, 6–2
1950	(Romania) Magda Rurac (2)	(United States) Laura Lou Jahn	1–6, 6–0, 6–0
1951	(United States) Lucille Davidson	(United States) Doris Popple	6–3, 6–3
1962	(Spain) Carmen Coronado	(United States) Mary Ann Eisel	4–6, 7–5, 6–2
1963	(France) Monique Salfati	(Denmark) Pia Balling	6–2, 8–6
1964	(West Germany) Helga Schultze	(West Germany) Heidi Schildknecht	4–6, 6–3, 6–2
1965	(United States) Kathy Harter	(Australia) Gail Sherriff	6–3, 6–1
1966	(United States) Kathy Harter (2)	(South Africa) Esme Emanuel	6–0, 6–4
1967	(United States) Stephanie DeFina	(South Africa) Esme Emanuel	6–4, 4–6, 6–4
1968	(United States) Julie Heldman	(South Africa) Laura Rossouw	4–6, 6–2, 7–5
1969	(Australia) Lesley Bowrey	(Australia) Kerry Harris	8–6, 4–6, 7–5
1970	(United States) Valerie Ziegenfuss	(United Kingdom) Corinne Molesworth	6–0, 6–2
