= David Freed Indoor Invitational =

Defunct tennis tournament
- Tour: ILTF World Open Circuit
- Founded: 1965
- Abolished: 1970
- Editions: 6
- Location: Salt Lake City, Utah; United States
- Venue: Salt Lake Swimming & Tennis Club
- Surface: Hard / indoor

The David Freed Indoor Invitational was a USLTA/ILTF affiliated indoor hard court tennis tournament founded in 1965 as the Western Indoor Invitational. It was first played at Salt Lake Swimming & Tennis Club, Salt Lake City, Utah, United States. The event ran annually until 1970 when it was discontinued.

== Past finals ==
=== Men's singles ===
(incomplete roll)

Year	Champion	Runner-up	Score
1965	(United States) Tom Edlefsen	(United States) Jim Osborne	6–2, 4–6, 12–10
1966	(United States) Stan Smith	(United States) Charlie Pasarell	7–5, 2–6, 8–6
1969	(United States) Jim McManus	(United States) Tom Gorman	6–3, 6–3
