= La Coruna International =

Annual tennis tournament in Spain (1966–1973)

Defunct tennis tournament
- Tour: ILTF Circuit
- Founded: 1966; 59 years ago
- Abolished: 1973; 52 years ago
- Location: La Coruña, Galacia, Spain
- Venue: La Coruña Tennis Club
- Surface: Clay

The La Coruna International or La Coruña Internacional was a men's and women's international tennis tournament founded in 1966 as the La Coruna Tournament or Torneo de La Coruña at the La Coruña Tennis Club, La Coruña, Galicia, Spain. It was played on outdoor clay courts until 1973.

== History ==
The Torneo de La Coruña was a men's and women's international tennis tournament founded in 1966. and was played on outdoor clay courts at the La Coruña Tennis Club, La Coruña, Galacia, Spain. The tournament was only held until 1973.

== Finals ==
=== Men's Singles ===
(incomplete roll)

Year	Champion	Runner-up	Score
1966	(Spain) Manuel Santana	(Socialist Federal Republic of Yugoslavia) Nikola Pilić	6-1, 3–6, 6-3
1967	(Spain) Manuel Santana (2)	(South Africa) Bob Hewitt	3-6, 6–0, 6-3
1968	(United States) Herb Fitzgibbon	(Spain) Juan Gisbert Sr.	6-3, 6-4
Open era
1969	(Romania) Ilie Năstase	(Spain) Manuel Santana	4-6, 6–4, 6–2, 11-9
1971	(West Germany) Harald Elschenbroich	(Spain) Manuel Santana	6-1, 8-6
1972	(France) François Jauffret	(Socialist Federal Republic of Yugoslavia) Nikola Špear	5-7, 8–6, 6–4, 6-4
1973	(Colombia) Jairo Velasco Sr.	(Spain) Jose Guerrero	6-4, 6-2

=== Men's Doubles ===
(incomplete roll)

Year	Champion	Runner-up	Score
1967	(Spain) Manuel Santana (Spain) José Luis Arilla	(South Africa) Bob Hewitt (Mexico) Rafael Osuna	6-1, 3–6, 7-5

=== Women's Singles ===
(incomplete roll)

Year	Champion	Runner-up	Score
1966	(Belgium) Christiane Mercelis	(Argentina) Norma Baylon	6-4, 6-4
1967	(West Germany) Helga Niessen	(Italy) Maria Nasuelli	6-1, 7-5
1968	(Australia) Lesley Turner	(France) Micele Noule	6-2 6-1
Open era
1969	(Uruguay) Fiorella Bonicelli	(France) Jacqueline Venturino	5-7, 6–2, 6-1
1970	(West Germany) Brigitte Schoene	(Spain) Carmen Renom	6-4, 6-2
1971	(Czechoslovakia) Marie Neumanová	(Brazil) Suzana Petersenn	1-6, 7–6, 6-2
1972	(Spain) Marie-Jose Aubet	(Romania) Judith Dibar	6-4, 6-3
1973	(France) Florence Guédy	(Spain) Carmen Perea	6-4, 6-3

=== Women's Doubles ===
(incomplete roll)

Year	Champion	Runner-up	Score
1968	(Australia) Lesley Turner (Spain) Charo Couder	(West Germany) Inge Koch (Sweden) Ingrid Löfdahl	7-5, 6-2
