= Quebec International Round Robin =

Defunct tennis tournament
- Tour: ILTF World Open Circuit
- Founded: 1965
- Abolished: 1969
- Editions: 5
- Location: Quebec City; Canada
- Venue: Civil Employee's Tennis Club
- Surface: Clay / outdoor

The Quebec International Round Robin was a men's ILTF affiliated clay court tennis tournament founded in 1965. It was played at the Civil Employee's Tennis Club in Quebec City, Quebec, Canada. The event ran annually until 1969 when it was discontinued.

== Past finals ==
=== Men's singles ===
(incomplete roll)

| Year | Champion | Runner-up | Score |
|---|---|---|---|
| 1965 | (France) Pierre Darmon | (United States) Ronald Holmberg | 7–5, 7–5 |
| 1966 | (Mexico) Rafael Osuna | (Spain) Manuel Santana | Round Robin |
| 1967 | (Brazil) Ronald Barnes | (Spain) Manuel Santana | Round Robin |
| 1968 | (Brazil) Thomaz Koch | (Spain) Manuel Santana | 7–5, 0–6, 6–4 |
| 1969 | (South Africa) Bob Hewitt | (Socialist Federal Republic of Yugoslavia) Željko Franulović | 6–3, 3–6, 6–2, 8–6 |
