= Pittsburgh Golf Club Invitation Indoors =

Defunct tennis tournament
- Founded: 1935; 90 years ago
- Abolished: 1969; 56 years ago
- Location: Pittsburgh, Pennsylvania, United States
- Venue: Pittsburgh Golf Club
- Surface: Hard (i) Carpet (i)

The Pittsburgh Golf Club Invitation Indoors was a men's tennis tournament founded in 1935. also known as the Pittsburgh Indoor. The tournament was held in Pittsburgh, Pennsylvania in the United States and played at first on indoor cement courts then switched to carpet courts.

== History ==
In 1935 the Pittsburgh Golf Club, Pittsburgh, Pennsylvania, United States established a men's indoor tennis tournament to be played on hard cement courts. American player Richard Berkeley Bell won the first event. The tournament lapsed until the 1955 when it was revived and re-branded as the Pittsburgh Golf Club Invitation Indoors that event was won by Tony Trabert. The final edition in 1969 was an invitation only tournament then it was discontinued. The final winner of the singles Czech player Jan Kodes.

== Finals ==
=== Men's Singles ===
(incomplete roll)

Pittsburgh Golf Club Invitation Indoors
Year	Winners	Runners up	Score
1935	(United States) Berkeley Bell	(United States) Gregory Mangin	6–3, 6–3, 4–6, 3–6, 6–3.
1948	(United States) Bill Talbert	(United States) Irvin Dorfman	4–6, 6–2, 6–4, 6–2.
1955	(United States) Tony Trabert	(United States) Vic Seixas	4–6, 9–7, 6–1.
1958	(United States) Ham Richardson	(United States) Barry MacKay	7–5, 6–1.
1959	(United States) Dick Savitt	(United States) Butch Buchholz	3–6, 6–2, 6–2.
1960	(United States) Chuck McKinley	(United States) Barry MacKay	6–3, 6–2.
1961	(United States) Ronald Holmberg	(United States) Sidney Schwartz	6–4, 6–3.
1962	(United States) Vic Seixas	(United States) Sidney Schwartz	4–6, 7–5, 6–4.
1963	(United States) Vic Seixas (2)	(United States) Donald Dell	6–0, 7–9, 6–4.
1964	(United States) Cliff Richey	(United States) Butch Newman	6–3, 4–6, 7–5.
1965	(United States) Ronald Holmberg (2)	(United States) Cliff Richey	4–6, 7–5, 6–1.
1966	(Socialist Federal Republic of Yugoslavia) Niki Pilic	(South Africa) Cliff Drysdale	3–6, 7–5, 6–2.
1967	(Socialist Federal Republic of Yugoslavia) Niki Pilic (2)	(Hungary) Istvan Gulyas	12–10, 7–5.
1968	(United Kingdom) Mark Cox	(United States) Bob Lutz	6–4, 2–6, 7–5.
1969	(Czechoslovakia) Jan Kodeš	(United States) Herb Fitzgibbon	8–6, 6–1.

== See also ==
For the women's event played later see;

- Pittsburgh Open (1979-1984)
