= Tidewater International =

Defunct tennis tournament
- Tour: ILTF World Open Circuit
- Founded: 1969
- Abolished: 1969
- Editions: 1
- Location: Norfolk, Virginia; United States
- Venue: Old Dominion College Fieldhouse
- Surface: Canvas over Wood / indoor

The Tidewater International was a men's USLTA/ILTF affiliated indoor canvas over wood court tennis tournament founded in 1969. It was organized by the Tidewater Tennis Association and played at the Old Dominion College Fieldhouse, (later renamed the Old Dominion University Fieldhouse) in Norfolk, Virginia, United States. The event ran for one edition as part of the Southern U.S./Caribbean Circuit when it was discontinued.

The tournament featured a 16 man field in singles.

== Past finals ==
=== Singles ===
| Year | Champion | Runner-up | Score |
|---|---|---|---|
| 1969 | (West Germany) Hans-Joachim Plötz | (Czechoslovakia) Jan Kukal | 6–4, 9–7 |
