= Northern California Championships =

Defunct tennis tournament
- Tour: USNLTA Circuit (1901–23); ILTF World Circuit (1924–69) men (1924–72)
- Founded: 1900; 125 years ago
- Abolished: 1974; 51 years ago
- Location: Sacramento; San Francisco
- Surface: Hard / outdoor

The Northern California Championships was a men's and women's international hard court tennis tournament founded in circa 1900 as the Championships of the Northern Counties of California a doubles event only. In 1902 a singles event was added to the schedule for the first time. It was first played at the Sacramento Lawn Tennis Club Sacramento, California, United States. It was also hosted at other locations throughout its run until 1974 when it was discontinued, and was known as the Northern California Sectional Championships at that point.

== History ==
The tournament was first held circa 1900 and was organised by the Northern Counties Lawn Tennis Association section, part of the Pacific States Lawn Tennis Association. It was held at the Sacramento Lawn Tennis Club, Sacramento, California, United States when it only staged a men's doubles event known as the Northern California Championship (Noack Cup), and the women's doubles event was known as the Northern California Championship (Klune & Floberg Trophy). In 1902 a singles event called the Northern California Championship for Tennis Singles was added to the schedule.

The tournament however was not held continuously and remained a sanctioned Pacific States LTA sanctioned event. In 1953 the Northern California Lawn Tennis Association was established as a separate sectional body within the United States Lawn Tennis Association. The championships were mainly held in Sacramento the state capital of California, then later in San Francisco. The event was discontinued as an individual competition in 1974 when it became a team competition. Previous winners of the men's singles have included; Jim McManus, Nick Carter, Whitney Reed, Tom Brown, Jeff Borowiak. Bob Siska and Bill Maze.

Former winners of the women's state singles championship has included; Virginia Wolfenden, Dorothy Head, Fay Pettit Marcie Louie, Rosie Casals, Brenda Garcia, and Pixie Lamm. The tournament was discontinued in 1974 as part of the senior ILTF Independent Circuit when it was switched from an individual competition to a team competition.

The championships were still being held as late as 2017, where it was known as the USTA Northern California Tennis On Campus Sectional Championships.
