= Anaheim Pro Invitational =

Defunct tennis tournament
- Tour: ILTF World Open Circuit
- Founded: 1969
- Abolished: 1969
- Editions: 1
- Location: Anaheim, California; United States
- Venue: Anaheim Convention Center
- Surface: Carpet / indoor

The Anaheim Pro Invitational was a USLTA/ILTF affiliated carpet court tennis tournament founded in 1969. It was played at the Anaheim Convention Center in Anaheim, California, United States for one edition when it was discontinued.

This tournament was notable for using the experimental Van Alen Simplified Scoring System (VASSS).

== Past finals ==
=== Singles ===
| Year | Champions | Runners-up | Score |
|---|---|---|---|
| 1969 | (Australia) Rod Laver | (United States) Ron Holmberg | 25–10, 26–24, 25–13. |
