= Reggio Calabria International =

Reggio Calabria International Internazionale di Reggio Calabria

Defunct tennis tournament
- Founded: 1959; 66 years ago
- Abolished: 1970; 55 years ago
- Location: Reggio Calabria, Calabria, Italy.
- Surface: Clay

The Reggio Calabria International or Internazionale di Reggio Calabria was a men's and women's international clay court tennis tournament founded in 1959. It was played at the ASD "Rocco Polimeni" Tennis Club, Reggio Calabria, Calabria, Italy. The tournament ran until 1970.

== History ==
In April 1959 ASD "Rocco Polimeni" Tennis Club in Regio Calabria established an open international tennis tournament for men and women. The tournament was played on outdoor clay courts at Reggio Calabria, Calabria, Italy through till 1970. It would be another twenty one years until 1991 before another international tournament was staged at the same venue, the Reggio Calabria Challenger tournament that ran till 1992.

== Finals ==
=== Men's singles ===
Year	Winner	Runner-up	Score
1959	(Italy) Giuseppe Merlo	(Italy) Nicola Pietrangeli	2-6, 6–1, 4–6, 7–5, 6-1
1960	(Italy) Giuseppe Merlo (2)	(West Germany) Peter Scholl	5-7, 9–7, 6–4, 6-4
1961	(Italy) Fausto Gardini	(Italy) Sergio Tacchini	6-2, 6–1, 6-1
1962	(Australia) Neale Fraser	(Italy) Fausto Gardini	6-3, 6–3, 4–6, 6-3
1963	(Italy) Giuseppe Merlo (3)	(Australia) Ken Fletcher	6-4, 6–4, 7-5
1964	(South Africa) Bob Hewitt	(Australia) Tony Roche	7–5, 8–6, 6-2
1965	(United States) Donald Dell	(Romania) Ion Țiriac	6-3, 6–3, 6-2
1966	(Australia) Tony Roche	(United States) Clark Graebner	7-5, 6–2, 6-3
1967	(Italy) Giuseppe Merlo (4)	(Australia) Owen Davidson	4-6, 6–1, 6–4, 6-1
1968	(United States) Marty Riessen	(Romania) Ilie Năstase	3-6, 3–6, 6–3, 6–4, 6-2
1969	(Australia) Martin Mulligan	(Romania) Ion Țiriac	6-2, 4–6, 6–3, 6-1
1970	(Australia) Martin Mulligan (2)	(Italy) Adriano Panatta	8-6, 6–4, 6-4

=== Women's singles ===
Year	Winner	Runner-up	Score
1959	(Mexico) Yola Ramírez	(South Africa) Sandra Reynolds	6–2, 6–8, 6-3
1960	(Mexico) Yola Ramírez (2)	(Italy) Silvana Lazzarino	6-2, 6-1
1961	(Italy) Maria Teresa Riedl	(Australia) Margaret Hellyer	6-1, 6-2
1962	(Italy) Lea Pericoli	(Australia) Judy Tegart	6-2, 6-2
1963	(Australia) Lesley Turner	(Australia) Jan Lehane	4–6, 12–10, 6-1
1964	(Australia) Margaret Smith	(Australia) Robyn Ebbern	6–0, 6-4
1965	(United States) Julie Heldman	(Australia) Madonna Schacht	2-4, retired
1966	(United States) Julie Heldman (2)	(West Germany) Helga Niessen	6-4, 1–6, 6-2
1967	(Australia) Lesley Turner (2)	(Czechoslovakia) Vlasta Vopickova	8-6, 6-4
1968	(Australia) Helen Gourlay	(United States) Alice Tym	6–4, 8-6
1969	(Czechoslovakia) Marie Neumannová	(Italy) Maria Nasuelli	6-4, 2-6 6-4
1970	(Czechoslovakia) Marie Neumannová (2)	(Italy) Monica Giorgi	6-3, 6-1
