= Manly Seaside Championships =

Tournament information
- Tour: ILTF Circuit (1933-82); ITF TA Satellite
- Founded: 1933; 92 years ago
- Location: Manly, Sydney Australia; Australia
- Venue: Manly Lawn Tennis Club (1933-2016); Various (2017-current)
- Surface: Grass; Clay
- Website: Manly Seaside Championships

Current champions
- Men's singles: (Australia) Jordan Smith
- Men's doubles: (Australia) Blake Smith (Australia) Cameron Edward Smith

The Manly Seaside Championships is a men's and women's tennis event founded in 1933 as the Manly Seaside Tournament. It was first played at Manly Lawn Tennis Club, Manly, Sydney, New South Wales, Australia. The tournament is currently branded as the Clarke & Humel Manly Seaside Championships (for sponsorship reasons).

== History ==
In 1884 the Manly Lawn Tennis Club was founded. In 1933 the Manly Seaside Tournament was established. The tournament was not held from 1942 to 1944 due to World War II. The championships were part of the worldwide senior ILTF Circuit through till 1982, and was not held in 1983 before the event was downgraded on the tour in 1984.

In 2016 the tournament was held solely for the last time at the Manly Lawn Tennis Club. Since then the event has increased in size and featuring several hundred participants annually, and played across several venues throughout the Northern Beaches. The championships are currently part of ITF Australian Satellite Circuit.

Australian tennis players including Ken Rosewall, Frank Sedgman, John Bromwich, Lew Hoad, Neale Fraser, Rod Laver, Fred Stolle, Joan Hartigan, Beryl Penrose, Margaret Smith, Evonne Goolagong, Christine O’Neil and Dianne Fromholtz have won the Seaside Championships. Notable foreign players who have won this event included; Thomas Pollok Brown, Osamu Ishiguro, Manuel Santana, Althea Gibson, Angela Mortimer, Zsofia Golopencza, and Lizaan du Plessis.
