= Mexican International =

Defunct tennis tournament
- Tour: ILTF World Circuit
- Founded: 1961; 65 years ago
- Abolished: 1969; 57 years ago
- Editions: 8
- Location: Mexico City, Mexico
- Venue: Centro Deportivo Chapultepec
- Surface: Clay

The Mexican Internationalwas a combined ILTF affiliated men's and women's clay court tennis tournament founded in 1961. Also known as the Mexico International the event was usually held the last week of March ending in early April depending on scheduling, and played at the Centro Deportivo Chapultepec, Mexico City, Mexico. The tournament was discontinued in 1969.

The successor event to this one is the Mexican Open.

== Past finals ==
=== Men's Singles ===
(incomplete roll)

Year	Winner	Runner-Up	Score
1962	(Spain) Manuel Santana	(Australia) Rod Laver	6–3, 6–4, 5–7, 7–5
1965	(Spain) Manuel Santana (2)	(India) Ramanathan Krishnan	6–3, 6–3, 4–6, 9–7
1966	(Australia) Tony Roche	(Mexico) Rafael Osuna	7–5, 4–6, 7–5, 6–3
1967	(Australia) Tony Roche (2)	(Australia) John Newcombe	4–6, 3–6, 7–5, 6–3, 8–6
1968	(Mexico) Rafael Osuna	(Mexico) Joaquin Loyo Mayo	6–4, 6–4, 6–4
1969	(Brazil) Thomaz Koch	(Mexico) Rafael Osuna	6–3, 6–4, 10–8

=== Women's Singles ===
(incomplete roll)

Year	Winner	Runner-Up	Score
1966	(Argentina) Norma Baylon	(Australia) Gail Sherriff	default
1967	(United Kingdom) Ann Jones	(Mexico) Elena Subirats	6–4, 6–4
1968	(United States) Julie Heldman	(United Kingdom) Ann Jones	default
1969	(United States) Val Ziegenfuss	(Mexico) Lulu Góngora	1–6, 7–5, 6–2
