= Glenwood Manor National Invitational =

Defunct tennis tournament
- Tour: ILTF World Open Circuit (1968-1972); ILTF Independent Circuit (1973-1975)
- Founded: 1968
- Abolished: 1975
- Editions: 8
- Location: Overland Park; Kansas City, Kansas, United States
- Venue: Best Weatern Glenwood Manor Motor Hotel Tennis Complex
- Surface: Hard / outdoor
- Prize money: $18,000 (1975)

The Glenwood Manor National Invitational was a combined outdoor USTA/ILTF affiliated hard court tennis tournament founded in 1968. The event was played at the Best Western Glenwood Manor Motor Hotel, Overland Park, Kansas City, Kansas, United States until 1975 then stopped. In 1977 it was succeeded by the Glenwood Manor Missouri Masters Championship.

== History ==
The Glenwood Manor National Invitational was founded in 1968 as a premier outdoor hard-court tournament in Overland Park, Kansas. Hosted at the prominent Best Western Glenwood Manor Motor Hotel complex, it served as a vital regional stop during the early transition into the Open Era.

The tournament regularly attracted top-tier American talent, including Grand Slam champions who used the mid-season event to sharpen their games.

Throughout its run into the mid-1970s, the event successfully navigated a highly fractured professional landscape by operating as an independent prize-money invitational and regional USLTA fixture. It showcased fierce baseline battles and legendary matchups featuring icons like Arthur Ashe and Clark Graebner. The tournament established a rich local tennis tradition that paved the way for its later 1977 successor.

== Past finals ==
=== Mens singles ===
Year	Winner	Runner-Up	Score
1968	(United States) Ronald Holmberg	(United States) Chuck McKinley	6–0, 6–2
1969	(United States) Clark Graebner	(United States) Tom Edlefsen	6–4, 3–6, 6–3
1970	(United States) Arthur Ashe	(United States) Clark Graebner	7–5, 6–1
1971	(United States) Cliff Richey	(Peru) Alex Olmedo	7—5, 5–7, 6–2
1972	(Peru) Alex Olmedo	(Pakistan) Haroon Rahim	6–2, 5–-7, 7–6
1973	(United States) Charlie Pasarell	(Australia) Tony Roche	6–1, 3–6, 6–3
1974	(United States) Clark Graebner (2)	(United States) Tom Edlefsen	6–7, 6–2, 6–4
1975	(Australia) Phil Dent	(Australia) Bob Carmichael	7–5, 1–6, 6–4

=== Womens singles ===
(incomplete roll)

Year	Winner	Runner-Up	Score
1969	(United States) Betty Ann Grubb	(United States) Karen Susman	6–4, 6–2
1971	(United States) Valerie Ziegenfuss	(United States) Mary Ann Curtis	6–1, 6–4
1972	(United States) Pam Richmond	(United States) Jane Stratton	6–4, 4–6, 6–4
