= Bad Neuenahr International =

Defunct tennis tournament
- Founded: 1909; 117 years ago
- Abolished: 1978; 48 years ago
- Location: Bad Neuenahr-Ahrweiler, Germany
- Venue: HTC Bad Neuenahr
- Surface: Clay (outdoors)

The Bad Neuenahr International or Internationale Bad Neuenahr was a combined tennis tournament founded in 1909 as the Neuenahr-Ahrweiler International. It was held at HTC Bad Neuenahr, Bad Neuenahr-Ahrweiler, Germany and played on outdoor clay courts. The tournament was discontinued in 1978.

== History ==
Bad Neuenahr-Ahrweiler is a spa town in the German Bundesland of the Rhineland-Palatinate that serves as the capital of the Ahrweiler district.

In 1882 a spa was first established in the town at Wiesenallee. Then two new lawn tennis courts were built, later further two tennis courts were built at the Kurhaus. By the early 1890s visiting wealthy spa guests and locals began to play against each other on these courts. In 1900 in order to promote tennis responsibility for staging events was down to the spa administrators.

In 1909 the first international open tennis tournaments were held and continued until 1911. The foreign participants were usually bathers taking a cure in the spa's. In 1912 the spa administration donated a "gold cup" that attracted good players from all over Europe to Neuenahr, known as the Neuenahr-Ahrweiler Gold Cup awarded to winners of the men's singles event in the international tournament. The first winner was the Belgian champion Louis Jacques Émile Trasenster. In 1920 the Hockey Tennis Club Bad Neuenahr was opened, with 14 new clay courts and the event transferred there. In 1921 the spa administration transferred the event to HTC Bad Neuenahr. The tournament was staged annually until 1978.

== Finals ==
=== Men's singles ===
(incomplete roll)

Year	Champions	Runners-up	Score
↓ German LTA Circuit ↓
1912	(Belgium) Louis Trasenster	(Germany) Claus Herberg	6–3, 6–3, 6–1.
1913	(Germany) Claus Herberg	(Germany) Wilhelm Gisbert Groos	6–4, 6–0, 6–2
1915/1919	Not held (due to World War I)		
↓ ILTF World Circuit ↓
1920	(Germany) Dr. A. Marcotty	?	?
1921	(Germany) Ernst Büchting	?	?
1922	(Germany) Frans Ludwig Hoppe	(Germany) Ernst Büchting	?
1924	(Germany) Heinz C. Landmann	(Germany) Fritz Kuhlmann	?
1925	(Germany) Conrad Kupsch	(Germany) Fritz Kuhlmann	6–2, 11–9, 5–7, 6–2
1926	(Germany) Erwin Statz	(Germany) Herr Claus	6–0, 4–6, 6–3, 6–2
1927	(Netherlands) Cornelis Albert Bryan	(Germany) Otto Froitzheim	8–6 4–6 3–6 ret.
1928	(Germany) Fritz Kuhlmann	(France) Jacques Bonte	6–3, 4–6, 6–2, 4–6, 6–3
1929	(France) Jacques Boussus	(Japan) Yoshiro Ota	6–4, 6–4, 7–5
1930	(Germany) Eberhard Nourney	(Germany) Ludmar Heitmann	6–2, 6–4, 6–2
1931	(Germany) Eberhard Nourney (2)	(Germany) Heinz Remmert	5–7, 6–1, 6–1, 6–0
1932	(Germany) C.Rudolf Strauss	(Germany) Karl Heinz Kretzer	8–6, 1–6, 2–6, 6–1, 6–1
1933	(Germany) Helmut Sindern	(Germany) Josef Hirtz	7–5, 0–6, 3–6, 6–3, 7–5
1934	(Germany) Eberhard Nourney (3)	(Germany) Erwin Statz	2–0, ret.
1935	(Germany) Eberhard Nourney (4)	(Germany) Edgar Dettmer	7-5, 7-5, 6-0
1936	(Germany) Fritz Kuhlmann	(Germany) Edgar Dettmer	2–6, 6–4, 2–6, 6–3, 6–0
1937	(Germany) Edmund Bartkowiak	(Germany) Harald Richter	6–1, 6–2, 6–0
1938	(Germany) Edmund Bartkowiak (2)	(Germany) Ludmar Heitmann	6–2, 6–1, 6–1
1939	(Germany) Helmut Gulcz	(Germany) Ernst Buchholz	6–1, 4–6, 6–1, 9–7
1940-48	Not held (due to World War II)		
1949	(Germany) Engelbert Koch	(Germany) Ernst Buchholz	6–4, 6–0, 6–2
1950	(Germany) Ernst Buchholz	(India) Dilip Bose	13–11, 6–3, 6–3
1951	(Poland) Wladyslaw Skonecki	(Germany) Ernst Buchholz	4–6, 6–1, ret.
1952	(United Kingdom) Tony Mottram	(Australia) Ian Ayre	6–0, 6–3, 6–1
1953	(Germany) Gottfried von Cramm	(Germany) Ernst Buchholz	4–6, 7–5, 6–1, 6–3
1954	(United Kingdom) Tony Mottram (2)	(Germany) Ernst Buchholz	7–5, 6–0
1955	(United States) Hugh Stewart	(United States) Malcolm Fox	6–2, 6–2
1956	(South Africa) Gordon Forbes	(Austria) Ladislav Legenstein	3–6, 6–4, 6–3, 8–6
1957	(Egypt) Jaroslav Drobný	(France) Pierre Darmon	6–1, 6–8, 6–4
1958	(India) Ramanathan Krishnan	(Brazil) Carlos Fernandes	3–6, 6–3, 3–6, 6–1, 6–2
1959	(Chile) Patricio Rodriguez	(Germany) Ernst Buchholz	6–2, 7–5, 6–3
1960	(Germany) Peter Scholl	(Brazil) Carlos Fernandes	4–6, 6–2, 6–1
1961	(Australia) Rod Laver	(Chile) Luis Ayala	6–3, 4–6, 6–3
1962	(Australia) Neale Fraser	(Germany) Ingo Buding	6–3, 6–3, 6–1
1963	(Hungary) István Gulyás	(Australia) Martin Mulligan	6–3, 4–6, 9–7, 6–0
1964	(Brazil) José Edison Mandarino	(Socialist Federal Republic of Yugoslavia) Boro Jovanović	6–1, 8–6, 6–4
1965	(Germany) Attila Korpás	(Germany) Lothar Pawlik	4–6, 8–6, 6–4
1966	(Germany) Attila Korpás (2)	(Germany) Horst Guenther Klameth	6–2, 8–6, 6–0
1967	(Germany) Wilhelm Bungert	(Germany) Harald Elschenbroich	2–6, 6–1, 6–4, 6–4
1968	(Japan) Koji Watanabe	(Hungary) István Gulyás	6–4, 6–8, 6–4
↓ Open era ↓
1969	(Australia) Martin Mulligan	(Germany) Wilhelm Bungert	6–3, 3–6, 13–11, 6–2
↓ ILTF Independent Circuit ↓
1970	(Germany) Attila Korpás (3)	(Hungary) István Gulyás	?
1971	(Germany) Christian Kuhnke	(Germany) Attila Korpás	7–5, 6–1, 8–10, 6–2
1972	(Germany) Karl Meiler	(Germany) Attila Korpás	6–3, 6–3, 6–1
1973	(Germany) Alex Kurucz	(Germany) Hans-Joachim Plötz	shared title
1974	(Germany) Harald Elschenbroich	(Czechoslovakia) Jan Kukal	5–7, 6–2, 6–0, 7–6
1975	(Hungary) Szabolcs Baranyi	(Czechoslovakia) Jan Kukal	6–4, 2–0, ret.
1976	(Germany) Peter Elter	(Germany) Werner Zirngibl	6–1, 1–0, ret.
1977	(France) Patrick Proisy	(Germany) Jürgen Fassbender	6–3, 6–1
1978	(Germany) Jürgen Fassbender	(United Kingdom) Buster Mottram	6–3, 6–4, 1–6, 6–7, 2–1, retd.

=== Women' singles ===
(incomplete roll)

Year	Champions	Runners-up	Score
↓ German LTA Circuit ↓
1911	(Germany) Baroness Hedwig Loë	(Germany) Baroness Grete Loë	8–6, 4–6, 7–5
1912	(Germany) G. Schell	(Germany) M. Kaubes	6–1, 3–6, 6–2
1915/1919	Not held (due to World War I)		
↓ ILTF World Circuit ↓
1924	(Germany) Fräulein Lutzmann	(Germany) Frau Suschen Rütten	6–4, 6–3, 6–3
1925	(Germany) Fräulein Lutzmann (2)	(Germany) Lidda Neumerkel	3–6, 7–5, 6–1, 6–2
1926	(Germany) Fräulein Lutzmann (3)	(Germany) Frau Suschen Rütten	6-1, 6-1, 6-3
1928	(Netherlands) Madzy Rollin Couquerque	(Netherlands) Margaretha Canters	5–7. 6–1 abandoned
1929	(Germany) Ilse Friedleben	(Germany) Hilde Krahwinkel	6–0, 6–0
1931	(Germany) Ilse Friedleben (2)	(Germany) Klara Hammer	4–6, 6–3, 6–1
1935	(Germany) Lisa Fabian	(Germany) Erna Reimann	6–1, 4–6, 6–4
1936	(Germany) Lisa Fabian	(Germany) Ingeborg Schumann	3–6, 6–3, 6–2
1937	(Germany) Margarathe Käppel	(Germany) Irmgard Rost	6–3, 6–0
1938	(Germany) Fräulein ten Elsen	(Germany) Fräulein Rduch	8–6, 6–6, retd
1940-48	Not held (due to World War II)		
1952	(United Kingdom) Joy Gannon Mottram	(Australia) Beryl Penrose	6–1, 6–2
1953	(United Kingdom) Joy Gannon Mottram (2)	(Czechoslovakia) Helena Matouš	6–1, 6–3
1954	(United Kingdom) Joy Gannon Mottram (3)	(Germany) Edda Buding	6–2, 6–1
1957	(United Kingdom) Angela Mortimer	(United Kingdom) Patricia Ward	6-1 8-6
1958	(Germany) Ilse Buding	(United Kingdom) Rita Bentley	6–4, 6–4
1959	(United Kingdom) Patricia Ward	(Argentina) Norma Baylon	4–6, 7–5, 7–5
1961	(South Africa) Sandra Reynolds	(South Africa) Renée Schuurman	6–3, 6–1
1962	(South Africa) Renée Schuurman	(Germany) Heide Schildknecht	6–2, 6–1
1964	(United Kingdom) Elizabeth Starkie	(Australia) Faye Toyne	6–1, 6–2
1967	(Germany) Helga Schultze	(Germany) Susanne Korpas	6–2, 6–1
↓ Open era ↓
1969	(Germany) Helga Schultze-Hosl (2)	(Germany) Helga Niessen	5–7, 7–5, 6–4
