= Dewar Cup Perth =

Defunct tennis tournament
- Event name: Dewar Cup Perth (1968–1969)
- Tour: Open tour, (1968–1969)
- Founded: 1968
- Abolished: 1969
- Editions: 2
- Location: Perth, Scotland, UK
- Surface: Carpet / indoor

The Dewar Cup Perth was an indoor tennis event held from 1968 through 1969 and played in Perth, Scotland as part of the Dewar Cup circuit of indoor tournaments held throughout the United Kingdom.

== Results ==
=== Men's singles ===
Year	Champions	Runners-up	Score
1968	(United Kingdom) Mark Cox	(South Africa) Bob Hewitt	6-3 6-4
1969	(United Kingdom) Mark Cox	(Egypt) Ismail El Shafei	3-6 14-12 6-1

=== Women's singles ===
Year	Champions	Runners-up	Score
1968	(Australia) Margaret Smith Court	(United States) Mary-Ann Eisel	6-2, 6-4
1969	(United Kingdom) Virginia Wade	(United Kingdom) Ann Haydon-Jones	9-7, 6-2

=== Women's doubles ===
Year	Champions	Runners-up	Score
1968	(Australia) Margaret Smith Court (South Africa) Pat Walkden	(United States) Mary-Ann Eisel (United Kingdom) Winnie Shaw	14-12, 6-4
