= Giuseppe Merlo =

Italian tennis player (1927–2019)

- Country (sports): Italy
- Born: 11 October 1927 Merano, Italy
- Died: 17 July 2019 (aged 91) Rome, Italy
- Turned pro: 1947 (amateur tour)
- Retired: 1969
- Plays: Right-handed (two-handed backhand)

Grand Slam singles results
- French Open: SF (1955, 1956)
- Wimbledon: 4R (1955)
- US Open: 1R (1955)

Grand Slam doubles results
- Wimbledon: 2R (1953)

Grand Slam mixed doubles results
- Wimbledon: 3R (1967)

Team competitions
- Davis Cup: F (1961^{Ch})

Giuseppe "Beppe" Merlo (11 October 1927 – 17 July 2019) was an Italian tennis player.

Merlo reached the semifinals of French Championships in 1955 (losing to Sven Davidson) and 1956 (losing to Lew Hoad). In the final of Rome in 1955, Merlo led 2 sets to 1 and had 2 match points against Fausto Gardini, but minutes later had to retire with cramps. Merlo lost in the Italian Open final again in 1957 (to Nicola Pietrangeli).

His other career highlights include winning the Reggio Calabria International tournament four times (1959–60, 1963, 1967)

He retired from competitive tennis in 1969 when he was 41 years old. He was 91 at the time of his death in July 2019.
