= Tennis at the 1968 Summer Olympics – Demonstration mixed doubles =

Demonstration mixed doubles
- Tennis at the 1968 Summer Olympics

Final
- Champions: (United States) Julie Heldman (United States) Herb Fitzgibbon
- Runners-up: (Germany) Helga Niessen (Germany) Jürgen Fassbender
- Score: 6–1, 6–3

Events
Demonstration
Singles	men	women
Doubles	men	women	mixed
Exhibition
Singles	men	women
Doubles	men	women	mixed
- Summer Olympics

Since the 1968 Summer Olympics did not feature tennis as an official sport, two unofficial tournaments were held during the Games: a Demonstration tournament and an Exhibition tournament.

The Demonstration tournament was played from 14 to 20 October 1968 at three venues in Guadalajara, Mexico: Guadalajara Country Club, Atlas Sports Club and Guadalajara Sports Club; all of them featured clay courts. All matches were played at best-of-five sets; since the tiebreak rule wasn't implemented until the 1970s, a team had to win a set by a two-game margin in case of a 6–6 draw.

Americans Julie Heldman and Herb Fitzgibbon won the tournament by defeating West Germans Helga Niessen and Jürgen Fassbender 6–1, 6–3 in the final. Peaches Bartkowicz and Jim Osborne, also Americans, won the third place.

== Seeds ==
The top two seeds received a bye into quarterfinals.

1. Valerie Ziegenfuss (USA) / Jim McManus (USA) (quarterfinals)
2. Lourdes Gongora (MEX) / Vicente Zarazúa (MEX) (quarterfinals)
3. Edda Buding (FRG) / Ingo Buding (FRG) (quarterfinals)
4. Rosa María Darmon (FRA) / Pierre Darmon (FRA) (semifinals, fourth place)

== Draw ==
First round
H Niessen (FRG); J Fassbender (FRG)	w	/	o
S Zenes (MEX); H Nerell (SWE)
4	RM Darmon (FRA); P Darmon (FRA)	6	6
AM Ycaza (ECU); M Olvera (ECU)	0	1
Z Jansone (URS); V Korotkov (URS)	w	/	o
C Rosado (MEX); R Osuna (MEX)
P Bartkowicz (USA); J Osborne (USA)	6	6
P Montaño (MEX); J Loyo Mayo (MEX)	4	1
ME Guzmán (ECU); P Guzmán (ECU)	3	6	6
3	E Buding (FRG); I Buding (FRG)	6	3	8
J Heldman (USA); H Fitzgibbon (USA)	5	6	6
S Petersen (BRA); M di Domenico (ITA)	7	3	2

Quarterfinals
1	V Ziegenfuss (USA); J McManus (USA)	6	1	5
H Niessen (FRG); J Fassbender (FRG)	3	6	7
4	RM Darmon (FRA); P Darmon (FRA)	6	6
Z Jansone (URS); V Korotkov (URS)	4	4
P Bartkowicz (USA); J Osborne (USA)	6	6	6
3	E Buding (FRG); I Buding (FRG)	8	4	3
J Heldman (USA); H Fitzgibbon (USA)	6	6
2	L Gongora (MEX); V Zarazúa (MEX)	3	4

Semifinals
H Niessen (FRG); J Fassbender (FRG)	3	6	6
4	RM Darmon (FRA); P Darmon (FRA)	6	3	4
P Bartkowicz (USA); J Osborne (USA)	6	9	8
J Heldman (USA); H Fitzgibbon (USA)	4	11	10

Final (gold-medal match)
H Niessen (FRG); J Fassbender (FRG)	1	3
J Heldman (USA); H Fitzgibbon (USA)	6	6

Bronze-medal match

Bronze-medal match
4	RM Darmon (FRA); P Darmon (FRA)	4	5
	P Bartkowicz (USA); J Osborne (USA)	6	7
