= Tennis at the 1968 Summer Olympics – Exhibition mixed doubles =

Exhibition mixed doubles
- Tennis at the 1968 Summer Olympics

Final
- Champions: (Soviet Union) Zaiga Jansone (Soviet Union) Vladimir Korotkov
- Runners-up: (United States) Peaches Bartkowicz (Germany) Ingo Buding
- Score: 7–5, 6–4

Events
Demonstration
Singles	men	women
Doubles	men	women	mixed
Exhibition
Singles	men	women
Doubles	men	women	mixed
- Summer Olympics

Since the 1968 Summer Olympics did not feature tennis as an official sport, two unofficial tournaments were held during the Games: a Demonstration tournament and an Exhibition tournament.

The Exhibition tournament was played from 24 to 26 October 1968 on the clay courts of the Chapultepec Sports Center in Mexico City, Mexico. All matches were played at best-of-three sets; since the tiebreak rule wasn't implemented until the 1970s, a team had to win a set by a two-game margin in case of a 6–6 draw. Due to the short length of the tournament, no third-place match was played, and both semifinal losers received bronze medals.

Soviets Zaiga Jansone and Vladimir Korotkov won the tournament by defeating American Peaches Bartkowicz and West German Ingo Buding 7–5, 6–4 in the final. Brazilian Suzana Petersen and also Soviet Teimuraz Kakulia, alongside French Rosa María Darmon and Pierre Darmon, have won bronze medals.

== Seeds ==
No seeds were given for this tournament.

== Draw ==
First round
Z Jansone (URS); V Korotkov (URS)	w	/	o
L Gongora (MEX); V Zarazúa (MEX)
RM Darmon (FRA); P Darmon (FRA)	6	6
V Ziegenfuss (USA); J McManus (USA)	1	2

Quarterfinals
J Heldman (USA); H Fitzgibbon (USA)
S Petersen (BRA); T Kakulia (URS)	w	/	o
ME Guzmán (ECU); P Guzmán (ECU)
Z Jansone (URS); V Korotkov (URS)	w	/	o
RM Darmon (FRA); P Darmon (FRA)	7	1	6
P Montaño (MEX); J Loyo Mayo (MEX)	5	6	2
P Bartkowicz (USA); I Buding (FRG)	w	/	o
H Niessen (FRG); J Fassbender (FRG)

Semifinals
S Petersen (BRA); T Kakulia (URS)	1	3
Z Jansone (URS); V Korotkov (URS)	6	6
RM Darmon (FRA); P Darmon (FRA)	6	2	1
P Bartkowicz (USA); I Buding (FRG)	3	6	6

Final (gold-medal match)
Z Jansone (URS); V Korotkov (URS)	7	6
P Bartkowicz (USA); I Buding (FRG)	5	4
