= Tennis at the 1968 Summer Olympics – Demonstration men's singles =

Demonstration men's singles
- Tennis at the 1968 Summer Olympics

Final
- Champion: (Spain) Manuel Santana
- Runner-up: (Spain) Manuel Orantes
- Score: 2–6, 6–3, 3–6, 6–3, 6–4

Events
Demonstration
Singles	men	women
Doubles	men	women	mixed
Exhibition
Singles	men	women
Doubles	men	women	mixed
- Summer Olympics

Since the 1968 Summer Olympics did not feature tennis as an official sport, two unofficial tournaments were held during the Games: a Demonstration tournament and an Exhibition tournament.

The Demonstration tournament was played from 14 to 20 October 1968 at three venues in Guadalajara, Mexico: Guadalajara Country Club, Atlas Sports Club and Guadalajara Sports Club; all of them featured clay courts. All matches were played at best-of-five sets; since the tiebreak rule was not implemented until the 1970s, a player had to win a set by a two-game margin in case of a 6–6 draw.

Spaniard Manuel Santana won the tournament by defeating his compatriot Manuel Orantes 2–6, 6–3, 3–6, 6–3, 6–4 in the final. American Herb Fitzgibbon won the third place.

== Seeds ==
1. Manuel Santana (ESP) (champion, gold medalist)
2. Herb Fitzgibbon (USA) (semifinals, bronze medalist)
3. Joaquín Loyo Mayo (MEX) (quarterfinals)
4. Juan Gisbert Sr. (ESP) (quarterfinals)
5. Rafael Osuna (MEX) (semifinals, fourth place)
6. Nicola Pietrangeli (ITA) (second round)
7. Pierre Darmon (FRA) (second round)
8. Jim Osborne (USA) (first round)

== Draw ==
=== Finals ===
Semifinals
1	Manuel Santana (ESP)	6	6	6
5	Rafael Osuna (MEX)	3	4	3
Manuel Orantes (ESP)	6	6	6
2	Herb Fitzgibbon (USA)	4	4	3

Final (gold-medal match)
1	Manuel Santana (ESP)	2	6	3	6	6
Manuel Orantes (ESP)	6	3	6	3	4
Bronze-medal match
5	Rafael Osuna (MEX)	4	3	5
2	Herb Fitzgibbon (USA)	6	6	7

=== Top half ===
First round
1	M Santana (ESP)	6	6	6
H Camarotti (CUB)	1	1	2
I Buding (FRG)	6	2	4	2
J Kamiwazumi (JPN)	4	6	6	2	r
8	J Osborne (USA)	3	5	3
J Ulrich (DEN)	6	7	6
V Zarazúa (MEX)	7	6	0	6
M di Domenico (ITA)	5	4	6	2
4	J Gisbert Sr. (ESP)	6	6	6
Y Shretta (KEN)	3	1	0
J McManus (USA)	6	2	3	6	7
A Volkov (URS)	2	6	6	4	5
5	R Osuna (MEX)	6	6	6
S Pasarell (USA)	3	2	2
M Olvera (ECU)	6	6	6
T Ortiz (PUR)	1	0	0

Second round
1	M Santana (ESP)	6	7	6
I Buding (FRG)	3	5	4
J Ulrich (DEN)	4	1	1
V Zarazúa (MEX)	6	6	6
4	J Gisbert Sr. (ESP)	6	8	6
J McManus (USA)	2	6	2
5	R Osuna (MEX)	6	6	6
M Olvera (ECU)	4	3	4

Quarterfinals
1	M Santana (ESP)	6	6	6
V Zarazúa (MEX)	1	0	2
4	J Gisbert Sr. (ESP)	4	6	6	6	1
5	R Osuna (MEX)	6	4	1	8	6

Semifinals
1	M Santana (ESP)	6	6	6
5	R Osuna (MEX)	3	4	3

=== Bottom half ===
First round
T Sakai (JPN)	3	8	0
M Orantes (ESP)	6	10	6
M Abdul-Aziz (KEN)	1	3	2
6	N Pietrangeli (ITA)	6	6	6
J Fassbender (FRG)	7	4	4	2
T Kakulia (URS)	5	6	6	6
JM Brito (CUB)	0	0	1
3	J Loyo Mayo (MEX)	6	6	6
P Guzmán (ECU)	8	5	2	r
T Ulrich (DEN)	6	7	5
A Carrero (PUR)	1	8	1
7	P Darmon (FRA)	6	10	6
V Korotkov (URS)	4	2	2
E Castigliano (ITA)	6	6	6
H Nerell (SWE)	6	4	3	5
2	H Fitzgibbon (USA)	3	6	6	7

Second round
M Orantes (ESP)	3	6	6	7
6	N Pietrangeli (ITA)	6	1	3	5
T Kakulia (URS)	7	1	3	7	3
3	J Loyo Mayo (MEX)	5	6	6	5	6
T Ulrich (DEN)	6	2	6	1	7
7	P Darmon (FRA)	2	6	3	6	5
E Castigliano (ITA)	5	2	3
2	H Fitzgibbon (USA)	7	6	6

Quarterfinals
M Orantes (ESP)	2	6	6	6
3	J Loyo Mayo (MEX)	6	2	4	1
T Ulrich (DEN)	3	2	1
2	H Fitzgibbon (USA)	6	6	6

Semifinals
M Orantes (ESP)	6	6	6
2	H Fitzgibbon (USA)	4	4	3
