= Tennis at the 1968 Summer Olympics – Exhibition men's doubles =

Exhibition men's doubles
- Tennis at the 1968 Summer Olympics

Final
- Champions: (Mexico) Rafael Osuna (Mexico) Vicente Zarazúa
- Runners-up: (France) Pierre Darmon (Mexico) Joaquín Loyo Mayo
- Score: 6–4, 3–6, 14–12

Events
Demonstration
Singles	men	women
Doubles	men	women	mixed
Exhibition
Singles	men	women
Doubles	men	women	mixed
- Summer Olympics

Since the 1968 Summer Olympics did not feature tennis as an official sport, two unofficial tournaments were held during the Games: a Demonstration tournament and an Exhibition tournament.

The Exhibition tournament was played from 24 to 26 October 1968 on the clay courts of the Chapultepec Sports Center in Mexico City, Mexico. All matches were played at best-of-three sets; since the tiebreak rule wasn't implemented until the 1970s, a team had to win a set by a two-game margin in case of a 6–6 draw. Due to the short length of the tournament, no third place match was played, and both semifinal losers received bronze medals.

Mexicans Rafael Osuna and Vicente Zarazúa won the title by defeating French Pierre Darmon and also Mexican Joaquín Loyo Mayo 6–4, 3–6, 14–12 in the final. Ecuatorian Pancho Guzmán and Soviet Teimuraz Kakulia, alongside also Soviets Vladimir Korotkov and Anatoli Volkov, have won bronze medals.

== Seeds ==
1. Rafael Osuna (MEX) / Vicente Zarazúa (MEX) (champions, gold medalists)
2. Pierre Darmon (FRA) / Joaquín Loyo Mayo (MEX) (final, silver medalists)

== Draw ==
First round
1	Rafael Osuna (MEX); Vicente Zarazúa (MEX)	w	/	o
Ingo Buding (FRG); Jürgen Fassbender (FRG)
Juan Manuel Brito (CUB); Humberto Camarotti (CUB)	4	3
Pancho Guzmán (ECU); Teimuraz Kakulia (URS)	6	6
Vladimir Korotkov (URS); Anatoli Volkov (URS)	3	6	6
Jun Kamiwazumi (JPN); Toshiro Sakai (JPN)	6	4	0
Herb Fitzgibbon (USA); Jim McManus (USA)	5	3
2	Pierre Darmon (FRA); Joaquín Loyo Mayo (MEX)	7	6

Semifinals
1	Rafael Osuna (MEX); Vicente Zarazúa (MEX)	4	8	6
Pancho Guzmán (ECU); Teimuraz Kakulia (URS)	6	6	0
Vladimir Korotkov (URS); Anatoli Volkov (URS)	5	6	2
2	Pierre Darmon (FRA); Joaquín Loyo Mayo (MEX)	7	1	6

Final
1	Rafael Osuna (MEX); Vicente Zarazúa (MEX)	6	3	14
2	Pierre Darmon (FRA); Joaquín Loyo Mayo (MEX)	4	6	12
