= Tennis at the 1968 Summer Olympics – Exhibition men's singles =

Exhibition men's singles
- Tennis at the 1968 Summer Olympics

Final
- Champion: (Mexico) Rafael Osuna
- Runner-up: (Germany) Ingo Buding
- Score: 6–3, 3–6, 6–3

Events
Demonstration
Singles	men	women
Doubles	men	women	mixed
Exhibition
Singles	men	women
Doubles	men	women	mixed
- Summer Olympics

Since the 1968 Summer Olympics did not feature tennis as an official sport, two unofficial tournaments were held during the Games: a Demonstration tournament and an Exhibition tournament.

The Exhibition tournament was played from 24 to 26 October 1968 on the clay courts of the Chapultepec Sports Center in Mexico City, Mexico. All matches were played at best-of-three sets; since the tiebreak rule was not implemented until the 1970s, a player had to win a set by a two-game margin in case of a 6–6 draw. Due to the short length of the tournament, no third-place match was played, and both semifinal losers received bronze medals.

Mexican Rafael Osuna won the tournament by defeating West German Ingo Buding 6–3, 3–6, 6–3 in the final. Both Soviet Vladimir Korotkov and Italian Nicola Pietrangeli won bronze medals.

== Seeds ==
Both seeds received a bye into the second round.

1. Herb Fitzgibbon (USA) (second round)
2. Rafael Osuna (MEX) (champion, gold medalist)

== Draw ==
=== Finals ===
Semifinals
Vladimir Korotkov (URS)	4	6	2
Ingo Buding (FRG)	6	4	6
Nicola Pietrangeli (ITA)	4	2
2	Rafael Osuna (MEX)	6	6

Final (gold-medal match)
Ingo Buding (FRG)	3	6	3
2	Rafael Osuna (MEX)	6	3	6

=== Top half ===
First round
I Buding (FRG)	6	6
J Loyo Mayo (MEX)	4	3

Second round
1	H Fitzgibbon (USA)	4	1
V Korotkov (URS)	6	6
P Darmon (FRA)	6	6
H Camarotti (CUB)	0	0
J Kamiwazumi (JPN)	6	6
J McManus (USA)	3	3
T Kakulia (URS)	4	2
I Buding (FRG)	6	6

Quarterfinals
V Korotkov (URS)	6	6
P Darmon (FRA)	4	4
J Kamiwazumi (JPN)	0	2
I Buding (FRG)	6	6

Semifinals
V Korotkov (URS)	4	6	2
I Buding (FRG)	6	4	6

=== Bottom half ===
First round
JM Brito (CUB)	4	3
P Guzmán (ECU)	6	6

Second round
P Guzmán (ECU)	4	4
N Pietrangeli (ITA)	6	6
T Sakai (JPN)	3	6
V Zarazúa (MEX)	6	8
Y Shretta (KEN)
A Volkov (URS)	w	/	o
M Abdul-Aziz (KEN)
2	R Osuna (MEX)	w	/	o

Quarterfinals
N Pietrangeli (ITA)	6	6
V Zarazúa (MEX)	4	0
A Volkov (URS)	2	5
2	R Osuna (MEX)	6	7

Semifinals
N Pietrangeli (ITA)	4	2
2	R Osuna (MEX)	6	6
