= Tennis at the 1968 Summer Olympics – Demonstration men's doubles =

Demonstration men's doubles
- Tennis at the 1968 Summer Olympics

Final
- Champions: (Mexico) Rafael Osuna (Mexico) Vicente Zarazúa
- Runners-up: (Spain) Juan Gisbert Sr. (Spain) Manuel Santana
- Score: 6–4, 6–3, 6–4

Events
Demonstration
| Singles | men | women |
| Doubles | men | women | mixed |
Exhibition
| Singles | men | women |
| Doubles | men | women | mixed |
- Summer Olympics

Since the 1968 Summer Olympics did not feature tennis as an official sport, two unofficial tournaments were held during the Games: a Demonstration tournament and an Exhibition tournament.

The Demonstration tournament was played from 14 to 20 October 1968 at three venues in Guadalajara, Mexico: Guadalajara Country Club, Atlas Sports Club and Guadalajara Sports Club; all of them featured clay courts. All matches were played at best-of-five sets; since the tiebreak rule wasn't implemented until the 1970s, a team had to win a set by a two-game margin in case of a 6–6 draw.

Mexicans Rafael Osuna and Vicente Zarazúa won the tournament by defeating Spaniards Juan Gisbert Sr. and Manuel Santana 6–4, 6–3, 6–4 in the final. French Pierre Darmon and Mexican Joaquín Loyo Mayo won the third place.

== Seeds ==
The top seed received a bye into the second round.

1. Juan Gisbert Sr. (ESP) / Manuel Santana (ESP) (final, silver medalists)
2. Rafael Osuna (MEX) / Vicente Zarazúa (MEX) (champions, gold medalists)
3. Jim McManus (USA) / Jim Osborne (USA) (quarterfinals)
4. Pierre Darmon (FRA) / Joaquín Loyo Mayo (MEX) (semifinals, bronze medalists)

== Draw ==
First round
V Korotkov (URS); A Volkov (URS) | 6 | 11 | 7
I Buding (FRG); J Fassbender (FRG) | 4 | 9 | 5
4 | P Darmon (FRA); J Loyo Mayo (MEX) | 4 | 6 | 7 | 6
J Ulrich (DEN); T Ulrich (DEN) | 6 | 1 | 5 | 3
A Carrero (PUR); S Pasarell (USA) | 3 | 2 | 8 | 6 | 6
JM Brito (CUB); H Camarotti (CUB) | 6 | 6 | 6 | 4 | 4
E Castigliano (ITA); M di Domenico (ITA) | 5 | 6 | 2 | 6 | 6
P Guzmán (ECU); M Olvera (ECU) | 7 | 4 | 6 | 3 | 8
M Abdul-Aziz (KEN); Y Shretta (KEN) | 3 | 2 | 3
3 | J McManus (USA); J Osborne (USA) | 6 | 6 | 6
J Kamiwazumi (JPN); T Sakai (JPN) | 1 | 2 | 3
M Orantes (ESP); N Pietrangeli (ITA) | 6 | 6 | 6
T Kakulia (URS); H Nerell (SWE) | 7 | 4 | 3 | 7 | 4
2 | R Osuna (MEX); V Zarazúa (MEX) | 5 | 6 | 6 | 5 | 6

Quarterfinals
1 | J Gisbert Sr. (ESP); M Santana (ESP) | 3 | 6 | 6 | 6
V Korotkov (URS); A Volkov (URS) | 6 | 4 | 3 | 4
4 | P Darmon (FRA); J Loyo Mayo (MEX) | 6 | 6 | 6
A Carrero (PUR); S Pasarell (USA) | 3 | 1 | 2
P Guzmán (ECU); M Olvera (ECU) | 6 | 3 | 6 | 1 | 6
3 | J McManus (USA); J Osborne (USA) | 2 | 6 | 1 | 6 | 4
M Orantes (ESP); N Pietrangeli (ITA) | 2 | 4 | 6
2 | R Osuna (MEX); V Zarazúa (MEX) | 6 | 6 | 8

Semifinals
1 | J Gisbert Sr. (ESP); M Santana (ESP) | 6 | 6 | 6
4 | P Darmon (FRA); J Loyo Mayo (MEX) | 3 | 4 | 4
P Guzmán (ECU); M Olvera (ECU) | 8 | 4 | 5
2 | R Osuna (MEX); V Zarazúa (MEX) | 10 | 6 | 7

Final (gold-medal match)
1 | J Gisbert Sr. (ESP); M Santana (ESP) | 4 | 3 | 4
2 | R Osuna (MEX); V Zarazúa (MEX) | 6 | 6 | 6
Bronze-medal match
4 | P Darmon (FRA); J Loyo Mayo (MEX) | 6 | 1 | 6 | 6
P Guzmán (ECU); M Olvera (ECU) | 4 | 6 | 1 | 3
