= Tennis at the 1968 Summer Olympics – Demonstration women's singles =

Demonstration women's singles
- Tennis at the 1968 Summer Olympics

Final
- Champion: (Germany) Helga Niessen
- Runner-up: (United States) Peaches Bartkowicz
- Score: 6–4, 6–3

Events
Demonstration
Singles	men	women
Doubles	men	women	mixed
Exhibition
Singles	men	women
Doubles	men	women	mixed
- Summer Olympics

Since the 1968 Summer Olympics did not feature tennis as an official sport, two unofficial tournaments were held during the Games: a Demonstration tournament and an Exhibition tournament.

The Demonstration tournament was played from 14 to 20 October 1968 at three venues in Guadalajara, Mexico: Guadalajara Country Club, Atlas Sports Club and Guadalajara Sports Club; all of them featured clay courts. All matches were played at best-of-three sets; since the tiebreak rule wasn't implemented until the 1970s, a player had to win a set by a two-game margin in case of a 6–6 draw.

West German Helga Niessen won the tournament by defeating American Peaches Bartkowicz 6–4, 6–3 in the final. Another American, Julie Heldman, won the third place.

== Seeds ==
Both seeds received a bye into the quarterfinals.

1. Peaches Bartkowicz (USA) (final, silver medalist)
2. Helga Niessen (FRG) (champion, gold medalist)

== Draw ==
First round
E Buding (FRG)	7	2	6
P Montaño (MEX)	5	6	4
L Gongora (MEX)	6	6
V Ziegenfuss (USA)	1	2
ME Guzmán (ECU)	6	6
Z Jansone (URS)	2	2
S Petersen (BRA)	1	2
J Heldman (USA)	6	6
AM Ycaza (ECU)	1	1
RM Darmon (FRA)	6	6

Quarterfinals
1	P Bartkowicz (USA)	4	6	7
E Buding (FRG)	6	4	5
L Gongora (MEX)	6	6
ME Guzmán (ECU)	2	2
J Heldman (USA)	6	6
RM Darmon (FRA)	3	3
C Rosado (MEX)	1	1
2	H Niessen (FRG)	6	6

Semifinals
1	P Bartkowicz (USA)	6	6
L Gongora (MEX)	2	2
J Heldman (USA)	3	6	3
2	H Niessen (FRG)	6	1	6

Final (gold-medal match)
1	P Bartkowicz (USA)	4	3
2	H Niessen (FRG)	6	6

Bronze-medal match

Bronze-medal match
L Gongora (MEX)	4	3
J Heldman (USA)	6	6
