= Tennis at the 1968 Summer Olympics – Demonstration women's doubles =

Demonstration women's doubles
- Tennis at the 1968 Summer Olympics

Final
- Champions: (Germany) Edda Buding (Germany) Helga Niessen
- Runners-up: (France) Rosa María Darmon (United States) Julie Heldman
- Score: 6–3, 6–4

Events
Demonstration
Singles	men	women
Doubles	men	women	mixed
Exhibition
Singles	men	women
Doubles	men	women	mixed
- Summer Olympics

Since the 1968 Summer Olympics did not feature tennis as an official sport, two unofficial tournaments were held during the Games: a Demonstration tournament and an Exhibition tournament.

The Demonstration tournament was played from 14 to 20 October 1968 at three venues in Guadalajara, Mexico: Guadalajara Country Club, Atlas Sports Club and Guadalajara Sports Club; all of them featured clay courts. All matches were played at best-of-three sets; since the tiebreak rule wasn't implemented until the 1970s, a team had to win a set by a two-game margin in case of a 6–6 draw.

West Germans Edda Buding and Helga Niessen won the tournament by defeating French Rosa María Darmon and American Julie Heldman 6–3, 6–4 in the final. Americans Peaches Bartkowicz and Valerie Ziegenfuss won the third place.

== Seeds ==
Both seeds received a bye into the semifinals.

1. Peaches Bartkowicz (USA) / Valerie Ziegenfuss (USA) (semifinals, bronze medalists)
2. Edda Buding (FRG) / Helga Niessen (FRG) (champions, gold medalists)

== Draw ==
First round
Rosa María Darmon (MEX); Julie Heldman (USA)	7	6
Suzana Petersen (BRA); Cecilia Rosado (MEX)	5	0
María Eugenia Guzmán (ECU); Ana María Ycaza (ECU)	5	6	3
Lucia Gongora (MEX); Patricia Montaño (MEX)	7	3	6

Semifinals
1	Peaches Bartkowicz (USA); Valerie Ziegenfuss (USA)	6	4	3
Rosa María Darmon (MEX); Julie Heldman (USA)	2	6	6
Lucia Gongora (MEX); Patricia Montaño (MEX)	4	1
2	Edda Buding (FRG); Helga Niessen (FRG)	6	6

Final (gold-medal match)
Rosa María Darmon (MEX); Julie Heldman (USA)	3	4
2	Edda Buding (FRG); Helga Niessen (FRG)	6	6
Bronze-medal match
1	Peaches Bartkowicz (USA); Valerie Ziegenfuss (USA)	6	6
Lucia Gongora (MEX); Patricia Montaño (MEX)	2	1
