= Rafael Osuna =

Mexican tennis player

- Osuna in 1963
- Full name: Rafael Osuna Herrera
- Country (sports): Mexico
- Born: 15 September 1938 Mexico City, Mexico
- Died: 4 June 1969 (aged 30) near Monterrey, Mexico
- Turned pro: 1958 (amateur tour)
- Retired: 4 June 1969 (death)
- Plays: Right-handed (one-handed backhand)
- Int. Tennis HoF: 1979 (member page)

Singles
- Career record: 293-140 (71.7%)
- Career titles: 13
- Highest ranking: No. 1 (1963, Lance Tingay)

Grand Slam singles results
- French Open: 4R (1964)
- Wimbledon: QF (1962, 1964, 1965)
- US Open: W (1963)

Other tournaments
- Olympic Games: SF (1968, demonstration)

Doubles
- Career record: 0–1

Grand Slam doubles results
- French Open: QF (1965)
- Wimbledon: W (1960, 1963)
- US Open: W (1962)

Other doubles tournaments
- Olympic Games: W (1968, demonstration)

Rafael Osuna Herrera (15 September 1938 – 4 June 1969), nicknamed "El Pelón" (The Hair), was a former male tennis player. He was born in Mexico City, and is best remembered for his singles victory at the United States National Championship in 1963, winning the 1960 and 1963 Wimbledon Doubles championships, the 1962 United States National Championship doubles, and for leading Mexico to its only Davis Cup Final round appearance in 1962. He is the only Mexican to date to be inducted into the International Tennis Hall of Fame, in 1979.

== Career ==
His first successes as an athlete occurred before he was ten years old, when he competed in the open category of the Mexican National Table Tennis Championships. In the course of the tournament, he upset the Mexico City Table Tennis Champion in singles, a feat remarkable both for Osuna's young age and the fact that it was his first tournament. Osuna also won the Doubles Championship, with Alfredo Ramos Uriarte as his partner. From age 10 to 14 he was ranked in the top 10 in Mexico's Open singles in table tennis.

He was awarded a full scholarship to attend the University of Southern California (USC) in the US, by Head Coach George Toley, who quickly identified Osuna as a major talent. Toley had to literally reteach Osuna how to play tennis because of his poor technique but, in Toley's own words ¨he moves on the tennis court like a God¨. Osuna participated in the 1960 Wimbledon championships, competing only in the doubles category with Dennis Ralston (soon to be his roommate at school). The two unknown youngsters soon made history, as the first unseeded pair to win the men's doubles at Wimbledon.

This victory marked the beginning of Osuna's career and fame. Described as an "agile and cerebral player" who "moves on the tennis court with the grace of a panther" (Tony Mottram), his subsequent achievements include:

- He is the only Mexican tennis player ever to win a Grand Slam event singles title, the United States Tennis Association National Championships Singles (1963). He is one of only three Latin Americans to win the US Championships, along with two Argentines Guillermo Vilas and Juan Martín del Potro.
- Osuna and Palafox are the only Mexican tennis players ever to win the United States National Championship doubles title, in 1962.
- In 1962, as the leader of the Mexican Davis Cup Team, Osuna led the team to its only Davis Cup Final to date, which was also the first-ever final reached by a Latin American country.
- His last victory (two weeks before his death in a plane crash) was an almost single-handed defeat of Australia in Davis Cup competition; Osuna won both his singles matches and the doubles. At that time Australia had won the Davis Cup 17 times, and the defeat was considered a major upset.
- USTA National Hard Courts singles and doubles champion 1962 and doubles champion 1969.
- Osuna was NCAA singles champion in 1962, doubles champion from 1961 to 1963, and team champion in 1962–63. The 1963 USC tennis team is regarded by some as the best collegiate tennis team of all time.
- Osuna won Mexico's only Olympic gold medals in tennis, in singles and in men's doubles with Vicente Zarazua in 1968, though they were both exhibition events. In the simultaneously run demonstration event, Osuna reached the semifinals in the singles and won the doubles tournament (again alongside Zarazua).
- Osuna earned a Bachelor in Science in Business Administration from the University of Southern California in 1963.

== Playing style ==
Osuna was known for his footspeed, touch, and tactical awareness. Commentator Bud Collins dubs him "Mexico's greatest player...Ubiquitous on court, confusing to foes, ever seeking the net". His U.S. Open victory came against big server Frank Froehling, a dangerous unseeded opponent who had upset top-seeded Roy Emerson in the fourth round. Collins describes Osuna's victory as a triumph of tactical play:

...Osuna cleverly neutralized [Froehling's] power with wonderfully conceived and executed tactics, especially lobbed service returns from 10 to 12 feet behind the baseline. Occasionally Osuna would stand in and take Froehling's serve on the rise, chipping the backhand, but more often he lobbed returns to disrupt Froehling's serve-volley rhythm and break down his suspect overhead. In fact, Osuna climbed the wall of the stadium to retrieve smashes and float back perfect lobs, frustrating Froehling with his nimble speed around the court, touch and tactical variations.

He is also remembered by his bold strategy against Bill Bowrey on the 4th match of the Mexico vs Australia Davis Cup tie in 1969. Coming back after the obligatory break after three sets (Osuna leading 2 sets to one), after holding serve on the first game, Osuna hits out, going for the lineas and keeping the ball away from Bowrey on each of all his service returns. While the knowledgeable public interprets this actions as trying to get loose, as the match progresses the public is baffled by Osuna continuing to do so after holding serve. Then, after holding serve and going up 4–3, Osuna changes his manner of play drastically by chipping in his return low to his opponents feet. At this precise moment Bowrey, in the entire 4th set and coming out of the rest period, has not hit one volley after his service motion due to the ¨hitting out¨strategy that Osuna implemented on this set. Bowrey is startled by the change of strategy on the first point. Osuna plays a superb second point to go up 0-30. Being love – 30 gets Bowrey extremely tight and gets broken. Osuna closes the match on his next service game.

== 1968 Olympic Summer Games ==
Osuna competed for Mexico in tennis at the 1968 Summer Olympics, which was a demonstration sport, with no medals awarded. He finished in first place in three events:

- Demonstration events – Men's doubles (with Vicente Zarazúa)
- Exhibition events – Men's singles
- Exhibition events – Men's doubles (with Vicente Zarazúa)

According to ESPN Latin America, Osuna's latest achievements such as reaching the world No. 1 and winning the United States Tennis Association National Championships in 1963 were highly influential factors for the organizers to create a tennis event for the Olympics.

Demonstration events

Held in Guadalajara.

| Event | Round of 32 | Round of 16 | Quarterfinals | Semifinals | Final / BM | |
| Event | Opposition Score | Opposition Score | Opposition Score | Opposition Score | Opposition Score | Rank |
|---|---|---|---|---|---|---|
| Singles | Pasarell (USA); W 6–3, 6–2, 6–2 | Olvera (ECU); W 6–4, 6–3, 6–4 | Gisbert Sr. (ESP); W 6–4, 4–6, 1–6, 8–6, 6–1 | Santana (ESP); L 3–6, 4–6, 3–6 | Fitzgibbon (USA); L 4–6, 3–6, 5–7 | 4 |
| Doubles (w/ Zarazúa) | —N/a | Kakulia (URS) / Nerell (SWE); W 5–7, 6–4, 6–3, 5–7, 6–4 | Orantes (ESP) / Pietrangeli (ITA); W 6–2, 6–4, 8–6 | Guzmán / Olvera (ECU); W 10–8, 6–4, 7–5 | Gisbert Sr. / Santana (ESP); W 6–4, 6–3, 6–4 | 1st place, gold medalist(s) |
| Mixed Doubles (w/ Rosado) | —N/a | Jansone / Korotkov (URS); L Withdrew | Did not advance | | | |

Exhibition events

Held in Mexico City.

| Event | Round of 32 | Round of 16 | Quarterfinals | Semifinals | Final / BM | |
| Event | Opposition Score | Opposition Score | Opposition Score | Opposition Score | Opposition Score | Rank |
|---|---|---|---|---|---|---|
| Singles | Bye | Abdul-Aziz (KEN); W Walkover | Volkov (URS); W 6–2, 7–5 | Pietrangeli (ITA); W 6–4, 6–2 | Buding (FRG); W 6–3, 3–6, 6–3 | 1st place, gold medalist(s) |
| Doubles (w/ Zarazúa) | —N/a | | Buding / Fassbender (FRG); W Walkover | Guzmán (ECU) / Kakulia (URS); W 4–6, 8–6, 6–0 | Darmon (FRA) / Loyo Mayo (MEX); W 6–4, 3–6, 14–12 | 1st place, gold medalist(s) |

== Death and family ==
Osuna was one of 79 people killed in the crash of Mexicana de Aviación Flight 704 on 4 June 1969 near Monterrey, Nuevo León, "Pico del Fraile", Tres Cerros. He was 30 years old. He left behind a wife, Leslie, and a daughter, Claudia.

== Posthumous honors ==
Osuna has received numerous posthumous honors, including:

- During the 1969 National Championships, the Intercollegiate Tennis Association NCAA instituted the Rafael Osuna Sportsmanship Award, the first new award added since 1881. Given to the most outstanding college tennis player, the criteria for the award are competitive excellence, sportsmanship, and contribution to tennis.
- During the 1969 US Open Championships at Forest Hills, two months after his death, the US Open Committee declared 28 August to be Rafael Osuna Day, honoring the memory of the former champion. This was the first time the tournament had honored a tennis player in this manner.
- In 1969 the Chapultepec Club, the cathedral of Mexican tennis and home to the majority of its history, named its stadium "Rafael Osuna".
- In 1972, with the intent to strengthen ties between the US and Mexico and to honor the memory of the only player ever to win the US Championships and the Mexican Open championships in singles, the "Osuna Cup" event was instituted. It is disputed annually by the official teams from both nations, and is the longest international tennis event played on Mexican territory, and the only one sanctioned by the USTA and the MTF.
- In 1970 Mr. Joseph F. Cullman, Honorary Chairman of the Board of the International Tennis Hall of Fame, presented to the Chancellor of the National Autonomous University of Mexico, Ing. Javier Barrios Sierra, ten scholarships in the name of Rafael Osuna to be awarded to outstanding Mexican students.
- On 14 July 1979, Osuna was inducted as a member of the International Tennis Hall of Fame, in Newport, Rhode Island. To date, Osuna is the only Mexican to receive this honor, and the second Mexican-born player (after John Doeg).
- In 1979, Mexican President José López Portillo y Pacheco unveiled an 8-foot-tall (2.4 m) statue of Rafael Osuna, erected by the Mexican National Athletics Institute at the Olympic plaza at the Mexican Olympic Committee.
- In 1983, the Intercollegiate Tennis College Association (NCAA) inaugurated their Tennis Hall of Fame, in Athens, Georgia. The inaugural class was the All Time NCAA Champions of Excellence. with 10 Players and 5 Head Coaches. Osuna was one of the ten along with such other great players as: Arthur Ashe, Dennis Ralston, Alex Olmedo, Ted Schroeder, Tony Trabert, and his Coach George Toley.
- In 1990 Mrs. Elena Osuna de Belmar published the biography Rafael Osuna: Sonata in Set Mayor. The book has been included in the International Tennis Hall of Fame Museum, Wimbledon Museum, USTA library, and Doheney library at USC. It is a collector's item, with only 2000 copies in the first edition.
- On 14 October 2006, the University of Southern California USC Hall of Fame Selection Committee selected Osuna to be inducted into the USC Athletic Hall of Fame on May 5, 2007.

== Grand Slam finals ==
=== Singles (1 title) ===
| Result | Year | Championship | Surface | Opponent | Score |
|---|---|---|---|---|---|
| Win | 1963 | U.S. National Championships | Grass | (United States) Frank Froehling | 7–5, 6–4, 6–2 |

=== Doubles (3 titles, 2 runners-up) ===
| Result | Year | Championship | Surface | Partner | Opponents | Score |
|---|---|---|---|---|---|---|
| Win | 1960 | Wimbledon | Grass | (United States) Dennis Ralston | (United Kingdom) Mike Davies (United Kingdom) Bobby Wilson | 7–5, 6–3, 10–8 |
| Loss | 1961 | U.S. National Championships | Grass | (Mexico) Antonio Palafox | (United States) Chuck McKinley (United States) Dennis Ralston | 3–6, 4–6, 6–2, 11–13 |
| Win | 1962 | U.S. National Championships | Grass | (Mexico) Antonio Palafox | (United States) Chuck McKinley (United States) Dennis Ralston | 6–4, 10–12, 1–6, 9–7, 6–3 |
| Win | 1963 | Wimbledon | Grass | (Mexico) Antonio Palafox | (France) Jean-Claude Barclay (France) Pierre Darmon | 4–6, 6–2, 6–2, 6–2 |
| Loss | 1963 | U.S. National Championships | Grass | (Mexico) Antonio Palafox | (United States) Chuck McKinley (United States) Dennis Ralston | 7–9, 6–4, 7–5, 3–6, 9–11 |

== Grand Slam tournament performance timeline ==
Key
| W | F | SF | QF | #R | RR | Q# | DNQ | A | NH |

(W) winner; (F) finalist; (SF) semifinalist; (QF) quarterfinalist; (#R) rounds 4, 3, 2, 1; (RR) round-robin stage; (Q#) qualification round; (DNQ) did not qualify; (A) absent; (NH) not held; (SR) strike rate (events won / competed); (W–L) win–loss record.

=== Singles ===
| Tournament | 1958 | 1959 | 1960 | 1961 | 1962 | 1963 | 1964 | 1965 | 1966 | 1967 | SR |
|---|---|---|---|---|---|---|---|---|---|---|---|
| Australian Championships | A | A | A | A | A | A | A | A | A | A | 0 / 0 |
| French Championships | A | A | A | A | A | A | 4R | 3R | A | A | 0 / 2 |
| Wimbledon | Q2 | A | 3R | A | QF | 3R | QF | QF | A | 2R | 0 / 6 |
| U.S. National Championships | A | A | 3R | SF | SF | W | SF | SF | 3R | 4R | 1 / 8 |
| Strike rate | 0 / 0 | 0 / 0 | 0 / 2 | 0 / 1 | 0 / 2 | 1 / 2 | 0 / 3 | 0 / 3 | 0 / 1 | 0 / 2 | 1 / 16 |
