= Tennis at the 1968 Summer Olympics =

- Tennis at the 1968 Summer Olympics

Events
Demonstration
Singles	men	women
Doubles	men	women	mixed
Exhibition
Singles	men	women
Doubles	men	women	mixed
- Summer Olympics

Tennis returned to the Summer Olympic program as an exhibition and a demonstration event in 1968. It would become an official sport 20 years later at the 1988 Summer Olympics. Men's and women's singles and doubles and mixed doubles were held in both, a Demonstration tournament and an Exhibition tournament. The Demonstration tournament was held in Guadalajara and the Exhibition tournament in Mexico City.

== Medal summary ==
=== Demonstration ===
Event	Champion	Second place	Third place
Men's Singles	Manuel Santana; Spain	Manuel Orantes; Spain	Herbert Fitzgibbon; United States
Women's Singles	Helga Niessen; West Germany	Jane Bartkowicz; United States	Julie Heldman; United States
Men's Doubles	Rafael Osuna; Vicente Zarazúa; Mexico	Juan Gisbert; Manuel Santana; Spain	Pierre Darmon; France; Joaquín Loyo Mayo; Mexico
Women's Doubles	Edda Buding; Helga Niessen; West Germany	Rosa Maria Darmon; Mexico; Julie Heldman; United States	Jane Bartkowicz; Valerie Ziegenfuss; United States
Mixed Doubles	Julie Heldman; Herbert Fitzgibbon; United States	Helga Niessen; Jürgen Fassbender; West Germany	Jane Bartkowicz; James Osborne; United States

=== Exhibition ===
Event	Champion	Second place	Third place
Men's Singles	Rafael Osuna; Mexico	Ingo Buding; West Germany	Vladimir Korotkov; Soviet Union
Men's Singles	Rafael Osuna; Mexico	Ingo Buding; West Germany	Nicola Pietrangeli; Italy
Women's Singles	Jane Bartkowicz; United States	Julie Heldman; United States	María Eugenia Guzmán; Ecuador
Women's Singles	Jane Bartkowicz; United States	Julie Heldman; United States	Suzana Petersen; Brazil
Men's Doubles	Rafael Osuna; Vicente Zarazúa; Mexico	Pierre Darmon; France; Joaquín Loyo Mayo; Mexico	Pancho Guzmán; Ecuador; Teimuraz Kakulia; Soviet Union
Men's Doubles	Rafael Osuna; Vicente Zarazúa; Mexico	Pierre Darmon; France; Joaquín Loyo Mayo; Mexico	Vladimir Korotkov; Anatoli Volkov; Soviet Union
Women's Doubles	Rosa Maria Darmon; Mexico; Julie Heldman; United States	Jane Bartkowicz; Valerie Ziegenfuss; United States	María Eugenia Guzmán; Ecuador; Suzana Petersen; Brazil
Women's Doubles	Rosa Maria Darmon; Mexico; Julie Heldman; United States	Jane Bartkowicz; Valerie Ziegenfuss; United States	Cecilia Rosado; Mexico; Zaiga Jansone; Soviet Union
Mixed Doubles	Zaiga Jansone; Vladimir Korotkov; Soviet Union	Jane Bartkowicz; United States; Ingo Buding; West Germany	Rosa Maria Darmon; Mexico; Pierre Darmon; France
Mixed Doubles	Zaiga Jansone; Vladimir Korotkov; Soviet Union	Jane Bartkowicz; United States; Ingo Buding; West Germany	Suzana Petersen; Brazil; Teimuraz Kakulia; Soviet Union
