= Tennis at the 1968 Summer Olympics – Exhibition women's singles =

Exhibition women's singles
- Tennis at the 1968 Summer Olympics

Final
- Champion: (United States) Peaches Bartkowicz
- Runner-up: (United States) Julie Heldman
- Score: 6–3, 6–2

Events
Demonstration
Singles	men	women
Doubles	men	women	mixed
Exhibition
Singles	men	women
Doubles	men	women	mixed
- Summer Olympics

Since the 1968 Summer Olympics did not feature tennis as an official sport, two unofficial tournaments were held during the Games: a Demonstration tournament and an Exhibition tournament.

The Exhibition tournament was played from 24 to 26 October 1968 on the clay courts of the Chapultepec Sports Center in Mexico City, Mexico. All matches were played at best-of-three sets; since the tiebreak rule wasn't implemented until the 1970s, a player had to win a set by a two-game margin in case of a 6–6 draw. Due to the short length of the tournament, no third-place match was played, and both semifinal losers received bronze medals.

American Peaches Bartkowicz won the title by defeating her compatriot Julie Heldman 6–3, 6–2 in the final. Both Brazilian Suzana Petersen and Ecuatorian María Eugenia Guzmán won bronze medals.

== Seeds ==
Both seeds received a bye into the quarterfinals.

1. Peaches Bartkowicz (USA) (champion, gold medalist)
2. Helga Niessen (FRG) (quarterfinals, withdrew)

== Draw ==
First round
RM Darmon (FRA)	6	6
V Ziegenfuss (USA)	3	2
S Petersen (BRA)	3	6	6
P Montaño (MEX)	6	1	4
C Rosado (MEX)	1	0
J Heldman (USA)	6	6

Quarterfinals
1	P Bartkowicz (USA)	6	7
Z Jansone (URS)	3	5
RM Darmon (FRA)	5	7	4
S Petersen (BRA)	7	5	6
J Heldman (USA)	6	6
L Gongora (MEX)	2	4
ME Guzmán (ECU)	w	/	o
2	H Niessen (FRG)

Semifinals
1	P Bartkowicz (USA)	6	6
S Petersen (BRA)	4	2
J Heldman (USA)	6	6
ME Guzmán (ECU)	1	0

Final (gold-medal match)
1	P Bartkowicz (USA)	6	6
J Heldman (USA)	3	2
