= 1969 Wimbledon Championships – Women's doubles =

Women's doubles
- 1969 Wimbledon Championships

Final
- Champions: (Australia) Margaret Court (Australia) Judy Tegart
- Runners-up: (United States) Patti Hogan (United States) Peggy Michel
- Score: 9–7, 6–2

Details
- Draw: 48 (4 Q )
- Seeds: 4

Events
Singles	men	women		boys	girls
Doubles	men	women	mixed	boys	girls
← 1968 ·	Wimbledon Championships	· 1970 →

Rosemary Casals and Billie Jean King were the defending champions, but lost in the third round to Jane Bartkowicz and Julie Heldman.

Margaret Court and Judy Tegart defeated Patti Hogan and Peggy Michel in the final, 9–7, 6–2 to win the ladies' doubles tennis title at the 1969 Wimbledon Championships.

== Seeds ==
1. (Australia) Margaret Court / (Australia) Judy Tegart (champions)
2. (United States) Rosie Casals / (United States) Billie Jean King (third round)
3. (France) Françoise Dürr / (United Kingdom) Ann Jones (third round)
4. (Australia) Lesley Bowrey / (United Kingdom) Virginia Wade (first round)

Click on the seed number of a player to go to their draw section.

== Draw ==
=== Key ===
- Q = Qualifier
- WC = Wild card
- LL = Lucky loser
- Alt = Alternate
- ITF = ITF entry
- PR = Protected ranking
- SR = Special ranking
- SE = Special exempt
- JE = Junior exempt
- JR = Junior Accelerator Programme entrant
- CO = College Accelerator Programme entrant
- NG = Next Gen Accelerator Program entrant
- w/o = Walkover
- r = Retired
- d = Defaulted

=== Finals ===
Quarterfinals
1	(Australia) Margaret Court (Australia) Judy Tegart	6	6
(United Kingdom) Christine Janes (United Kingdom) Nell Truman	1	4
(Australia) Kerry Harris (Australia) Fay Moore	5	8	1
(United States) Mary-Ann Curtis (United States) Valerie Ziegenfuss	7	6	6
(France) Gail Chanfreau (Australia) Carol Sherriff	7	1
(United States) Patti Hogan (United States) Peggy Michel	9	6
(Australia) Karen Krantzcke (Australia) Kerry Melville	6	6
(United States) Peaches Bartkowicz (United States) Julie Heldman	3	2

Semifinals
1	(Australia) Margaret Court (Australia) Judy Tegart	6	6
(United States) Mary-Ann Curtis (United States) Valerie Ziegenfuss	1	4
(United States) Patti Hogan (United States) Peggy Michel	4	6	7
(Australia) Karen Krantzcke (Australia) Kerry Melville	6	2	5

Final
1	(Australia) Margaret Court (Australia) Judy Tegart	9	6
(United States) Patti Hogan (United States) Peggy Michel	7	2

=== Top half ===
==== Section 1 ====
First round

Second round
1	(Australia) M Court (Australia) J Tegart	6	6
Q	(Canada) J O'Hara (Canada) J Tindle	0	1
(Netherlands) B Stöve (United Kingdom) J Williams	6	6
(Australia) W Gilchrist (Australia) J Young	3	4
(United Kingdom) C Janes (United Kingdom) E Truman	6	6
(Italy) L Bassi (Italy) MT Riedl	1	3
Q	(United States) R Bailey (United States) J Davenport	0	2
(United Kingdom) R Lloyd (United Kingdom) F Taylor	6	6

Third round
1	(Australia) M Court (Australia) J Tegart	6	6
(Netherlands) B Stöve (United Kingdom) J Williams	2	3
(United Kingdom) C Janes (United Kingdom) E Truman	6	6
(United Kingdom) R Lloyd (United Kingdom) F Taylor	1	1

Quarterfinals
1	(Australia) M Court (Australia) J Tegart	6	6
(United Kingdom) C Truman Janes (United Kingdom) E Truman	1	4

==== Section 2 ====
First round
4	(Australia) L Bowrey (United Kingdom) V Wade	4	6	3
(Australia) K Harris (Australia) F Moore	6	2	6
(Spain) MJ Aubet (Spain) C Mandarino	1	2
(Soviet Union) O Morozova (Soviet Union) Z Jansone	6	6
(South Africa) M Brummer (South Africa) A van Deventer	3	7	3
(South Africa) E Emmanuel (United States) C Martinez	6	5	6
(Argentina) R Giscafré (Ecuador) ME Guzmán	6	6
(Belgium) I Loeys (France) É Terras	1	3
(Japan) J Sawamatsu (Japan) K Sawamatsu	10	1	6
Q	(South Africa) G Dove (South Africa) J Wilshere	8	6	4
(United Kingdom) A Soady (United Kingdom) J Townsend	6	1	6
(Netherlands) M Schaar (Netherlands) E Veentjer-Spruyt	2	6	2
(South Africa) M Procter (South Africa) L Rossouw	6	3	6
(United Kingdom) E Ernest (New Zealand) B Vercoe	1	6	4
(United States) M Aschner (Netherlands) J Salomé	2	0
(United States) M-A Curtis (United States) V Ziegenfuss	6	6

Second round
(Australia) K Harris (Australia) F Moore	6	6
(Soviet Union) O Morozova (Soviet Union) Z Jansone	4	2
(South Africa) E Emmanuel (United States) C Martinez	6	6
(Argentina) R Giscafré (Ecuador) ME Guzmánn	1	3
(Japan) J Sawamatsu (Japan) K Sawamatsu	6	6
(United Kingdom) A Soady (United Kingdom) J Townsend	1	0
(South Africa) M Procter (South Africa) L Rossouw	2	1
(United States) M-A Curtis (United States) V Ziegenfuss	6	6

Third round
(Australia) K Harris (Australia) F Moore	6	6	6
(South Africa) E Emmanuel (United States) C Martinez	1	8	4
(Japan) J Sawamatsu (Japan) K Sawamatsu	5	3
(United States) M-A Curtis (United States) V Ziegenfuss	7	6

Quarterfinals
(Australia) K Harris (Australia) F Moore	5	8	1
(United States) M-A Curtis (United States) V Ziegenfuss	7	6	6

=== Bottom half ===
==== Section 3 ====
First round
(South Africa) V Forbes (South Africa) B Vukovich	1	4
(France) R Darmon (Italy) L Pericoli	6	6
(Sweden) C Sandberg (Sweden) M Strandberg	2	0
(United States) N Richey (United Kingdom) W Shaw	6	6
(France) G Chanfreau (Australia) C Sherriff	6	4	6
(South Africa) B Kirk (South Africa) W Tomlinson	3	6	4
(Netherlands) A Bakker (Netherlands) A Suurbeek	6	6
(Argentina) G Moran (Brazil) S Petersen	1	1
(United States) T Fretz (United States) L Tuero	1	1
(United States) P Hogan (United States) M Michel	6	6
Q	(Indonesia) L Kaligis (Indonesia) L Liem	6	6
(United States) S Grant (United States) BA Grubb	4	4
(United States) D Carter (United States) K Pigeon	8	6
(United Kingdom) S Brasher (Rhodesia) P Walkden	6	3
(United States) J Anthony (Canada) F Urban	0	5
3	(France) F Dürr (United Kingdom) A Jones	6	7

Second round
(France) R Darmon (Italy) L Pericoli	w/o
(United States) N Richey (United Kingdom) W Shaw
(France) G Chanfreau (Australia) C Sherriff	9	6
(Netherlands) A Bakker (Netherlands) A Suurbeek	7	2
(United States) P Hogan (United States) M Michel	6	6
Q	(Indonesia) L Kaligis (Indonesia) L Liem	3	1
(United States) D Carter (United States) K Pigeon	2	2
3	(France) F Dürr (United Kingdom) A Jones	6	6

Third round
(France) R Darmon (Italy) L Pericoli	2	8
(France) G Chanfreau (Australia) C Sherriff	6	10
(United States) P Hogan (United States) M Michel	7	6
3	(France) F Dürr (United Kingdom) A Jones	5	4

Quarterfinals
(France) G Chanfreau (Australia) C Sherriff	7	1
(United States) P Hogan (United States) M Michel	9	6

==== Section 4 ====
First round

Second round
(United Kingdom) J Cooper (United Kingdom) C Molesworth	2	1
(Australia) K Krantzcke (Australia) K Melville	6	6
(Australia) H Gourlay (Australia) L Hunt	6	7
(Japan) K Yagahara (Japan) Y Matsuda	1	5
(United States) J Bartkowicz (United States) J Heldman	6	6
(Argentina) AM Arias (Argentina) A Cavadini	0	2
(United Kingdom) J Congdon (United Kingdom) S Holdsworth	2	2
2	(United States) R Casals (United States) BJ King	6	6

Third round
(Australia) K Krantzcke (Australia) K Melville	6	6
(Australia) H Gourlay (Australia) L Hunt	2	2
(United States) J Bartkowicz (United States) J Heldman	5	6	8
2	(United States) R Casals (United States) BJ King	7	3	6

Quarterfinals
(Australia) K Krantzcke (Australia) K Melville	6	6
(United States) J Bartkowicz (United States) J Heldman	3	2
