= Tennis at the 1968 Summer Olympics – Exhibition women's doubles =

Exhibition women's doubles
- Tennis at the 1968 Summer Olympics

Final
- Champions: (France) Rosa María Darmon (United States) Julie Heldman
- Runners-up: (United States) Peaches Bartkowicz (United States) Valerie Ziegenfuss
- Score: 6–0, 10–8

Events
Demonstration
Singles	men	women
Doubles	men	women	mixed
Exhibition
Singles	men	women
Doubles	men	women	mixed
- Summer Olympics

Since the 1968 Summer Olympics did not feature tennis as an official sport, two unofficial tournaments were held during the Games: a Demonstration tournament and an Exhibition tournament.

The Exhibition tournament was played from 24 to 26 October 1968 on the clay courts of the Chapultepec Sports Center in Mexico City, Mexico. All matches were played at best-of-three sets; since the tiebreak rule wasn't implemented until the 1970s, a team had to win a set by a two-game margin in case of a 6–6 draw. Due to the short length of the tournament, no third-place match was played, and both semifinal losers received bronze medals.

French Rosa María Darmon and American Julie Heldman won the tournament by defeating also Americans Peaches Bartkowicz and Valerie Ziegenfuss 6–0, 10–8 in the final. Ecuatorian María Eugenia Guzmán and Brazilian Suzana Petersen, alongside Mexican Cecilia Rosado and Soviet Zaiga Jansone, have all won bronze medals.

Due to the short draw, 4 out of 5 pairs have won medals, giving the tournament an unusual 80% of chances of winning a medal.

== Seeds ==
Both seeds received a bye into the semifinals.

1. Peaches Bartkowicz (USA) / Valerie Ziegenfuss (USA) (final, silver medalists)
2. Rosa María Darmon (FRA) / Julie Heldman (USA) (champions, gold medalists)

== Draw ==
First round				Semifinals					Final (gold-medal match)
				1	Peaches Bartkowicz (USA); Valerie Ziegenfuss (USA)	6	6
Lucia Gongora (MEX); Patricia Montaño (MEX)	4	6	1		María Eugenia Guzmán (ECU); Suzana Petersen (BRA)	2	2
María Eugenia Guzmán (ECU); Suzana Petersen (BRA)	6	4	6						1	Peaches Bartkowicz (USA); Valerie Ziegenfuss (USA)	0	8
									2	Rosa María Darmon (FRA); Julie Heldman (USA)	6	10
					Cecilia Rosado (MEX); Zaiga Jansone (URS)	2	6	1
				2	Rosa María Darmon (FRA); Julie Heldman (USA)	6	4	6
