= Bartkowicz =

Bartkowicz is a Polish surname. Notable people with this surname include:

- Chris Bartkowicz, American health activist
- Jane Bartkowicz (born 1949), American tennis player
