= Julius Heldman =

American tennis player (1919–2006)

Julius Heldman (May 9, 1919 – September 22, 2006) was born in Los Angeles, California. He attended Hollywood High School in Los Angeles and entered UCLA at age 15. He was the Tennis Team Captain at UCLA and became the National Junior Tennis Champion in 1936. He was taught tennis by legendary tennis teacher, Dick Skeen. He received a Doctorate from Stanford University in physical chemistry and became a Shell Oil executive and worked on the Manhattan Project. He died in Albuquerque, New Mexico at age 87.

== Life and career ==
Heldman was a Hollywood High School student when he captured the United States Junior (18 & under) Outdoor Singles and Doubles Championships. He was a child prodigy and entered UCLA at the age of 15 (1934), won the National Juniors in 1936, and was the Pacific Coast's Intercollegiate Singles Champion in 1937. He was the captain of the UCLA tennis team until 1939 when he graduated and left to obtain his Doctorate in physical chemistry from Stanford. He was a National Research Fellow from 1942 to 1943. During World War II, he was asked to be part of the Manhattan Project and he relocated the family to Oak Ridge, Tennessee. After the war, Heldman joined Shell Oil in Houston and New York where he worked as an Executive from 1945 to 1980 until retiring to Santa Fe, New Mexico.

While working for Shell Oil, he continued to play tennis. Heldman was ranked #1 in Men's Singles by the Southern California Tennis Association in 1947. He won the U.S. Senior (45-over) Indoor titles in both 1964 and 1965, and was also the 1964 Outdoor Clay Court Champion. During the late 1960s, he got to the semi-finals of the Wimbledon Senior Doubles three different times. In his tennis career he had wins over Jack Kramer, Ted Schroeder, and Herbie Flam.

In 1997 he was inducted into the Southern California Jewish Sports Hall of Fame.

== Family ==
Heldman was married to Gladys Heldman, the founder of World Tennis magazine, and was the father of Carrie and Julie Heldman.

== Death ==
He died in 2006 at the age of 87 at University of New Mexico Hospital in Albuquerque. He had esophageal and stomach cancer.
