= 1972 Virginia Slims of Oklahoma City =

- Date: February 16–19
- Edition: 2bd
- Draw: 16S / ?D
- Prize money: $20,000
- Surface: Carpet (Sportface) / indoor
- Location: Oklahoma City, Oklahoma, U.S.
- Venue: Frederickson Field House Arena

Champions

Singles
- (United States) Rosie Casals

Doubles
- (United States) Rosie Casals / (United States) Billie Jean King
← 1971 ·	Virginia Slims of Oklahoma City

The 1972 Virginia Slims of Oklahoma City was a women's tennis tournament played on indoor carpet courts at the Frederickson Field House Arena in Oklahoma City, Oklahoma in the United States that was part of the 1972 WT Pro Tour. It was the second and last edition of the tournament and was held from February 16 through February 19, 1972. Third-seeded Rosie Casals won the singles title and earned $4,000 first-prize money.

== Finals ==
=== Singles ===
(United States) Rosie Casals defeated (United States) Valerie Ziegenfuss 6–4, 6–1

=== Doubles ===
(United States) Rosie Casals / (United States) Billie Jean King defeated (Australia) Judy Dalton / (France) Françoise Dürr 6–7^{(4–5)}, 7–6^{(5–2)}, 6–2

== Prize money ==
Event	W	F	3rd	4th	QF	Round of 16
Singles	$4,000	$2,600	$1,800	$1,500	$750	$400
