= 1961 NCAA tennis championships =

1961 NCAA Tennis Championships
- Date: June 1961
- Edition: 16th
- Location: Ames, Iowa
- Venue: Forker Tennis Courts; Iowa State University

Champions

Men's singles
- (United States) Allen Fox (UCLA)

Men's doubles
- (Mexico) Rafael Osuna / (United States) Ramsey Earnhart (USC)
← 1960 ·	NCAA Tennis Championships	· 1962 →

The 1961 NCAA Tennis Championships were the 16th annual NCAA-sponsored tournaments to determine the national champions of men's singles, doubles, and team collegiate tennis in the United States.

Defending champions UCLA again captured the team championship, the Bruins' seventh such title. UCLA finished just one point ahead of rivals USC in the final team standings (17–16).

== Host site ==
This year's tournaments were contested at the Forker Tennis Courts at the newly-rechristened Iowa State University in Ames, Iowa.

== Team scoring ==
Until 1977, the men's team championship was determined by points awarded based on individual performances in the singles and doubles events.
