= 1962 NCAA tennis championships =

1962 NCAA Tennis Championships
- Date: June 1962
- Edition: 17th
- Location: Stanford, California
- Venue: Taube Tennis Center; Stanford University

Champions

Men's singles
- (Mexico) Rafael Osuna (USC)

Men's doubles
- (Mexico) Rafael Osuna / (United States) Ramsey Earnhart (USC)
← 1961 ·	NCAA Tennis Championships	· 1963 →

The 1962 NCAA Tennis Championships were the 17th annual NCAA-sponsored tournaments to determine the national champions of men's singles, doubles, and team collegiate tennis in the United States.

USC captured the team championship, the Trojans' fifth such title. USC finished ten points ahead of rivals, and two-time defending champions, UCLA in the final team standings (22–12).

This was the final tournament before the establishment of separate championships for the NCAA's University and College Divisions. The inaugural NCAA College Division Tennis Championship was held in Saint Louis in 1963.

== Host site ==
This year's tournaments were contested at the Taube Tennis Center at Stanford University in Stanford, California.

== Team scoring ==
Until 1977, the men's team championship was determined by points awarded based on individual performances in the singles and doubles events.
