= 1963 NCAA University Division tennis championships =

1963 NCAA University Division Tennis Championships
- Date: May 1963
- Edition: 18th
- Location: Princeton, New Jersey
- Venue: Lenz Tennis Center; Princeton University

Champions

Men's singles
- (United States) Dennis Ralston (USC)

Men's doubles
- (Mexico) Rafael Osuna / (United States) Dennis Ralston (USC)
← 1962 ·	NCAA University Division Tennis Championships	· 1964 →

The 1963 NCAA Tennis Championships were the 18th annual tournaments to determine the national champions of University Division men's singles, doubles, and team collegiate tennis in the United States.

Defending champions USC captured the team championship, the Trojans' sixth such title. USC finished eight points ahead of rivals UCLA in the final team standings (27–19).

This was the first tournament held exclusively for teams from the NCAA's University Division (now Division I). Smaller universities were placed into the College Division, whose inaugural tennis championship was played in St. Louis and won by Cal State Los Angeles.

== Host site ==
This year's tournaments were contested at the Lenz Tennis Center at Princeton University in Princeton, New Jersey.

== Team scoring ==
Until 1977, the men's team championship was determined by points awarded based on individual performances in the singles and doubles events.
