= Le Touquet International Challenge Cup =

Defunct tennis tournament
- Tour: ILTF World Circuit
- Founded: 1951
- Abolished: 1971
- Location: Le Touquet; France
- Venue: Le Touquet Tennis Club
- Surface: Clay / outdoor

The Le Touquet International Challenge Cup was an ILTF affiliated men's and women's clay court tennis founded in 1951. Also known as the Le Touquet August Meeting it was played at the Le Touquet Tennis Club, Le Touquet, France. It was usually held in mid August and was staged annually until 1971 when it was discontinued.

== Past finals ==
=== Men's singles ===
(incomplete roll)

Year	Winner	Runner-up	Score
1951	(Egypt) Jaroslav Drobný	(Belgium) Jacques Brichant	0–6, 6–3, 6–0
1962	(Australia) Geoff Hughes	(Australia) Noel Holland	6–4, 6–1, –
1963	(France) Philippe Fremiot	(Australia) Ron McKenzie	4–6, 9–7, 6–0
1964	(France) Marcel Bernard	(France) Jean Louis Thiebaut	7–5, 2–6, 6–3
1966	(France) Pierre Darmon	(Australia) Fred Stolle	6–4, 6–4, 3–6, 6–3
1967	(France) Pierre Darmon (2)	(Greece) Nicky Kalogeropoulos	6–3, 7–5, 6–4
1968	(Australia) Ken Fletcher	(France) Pierre Darmon	6–4, 6–3, 6–2
1970	(France) Patrick Proisy	(France) Michel Leclercq	5–7, 8–6, 6–3, 6–1
1971	(France) Christian Duxin	(France) Patrick Beraud	6–0, 0–6, 6–2

=== Women's singles ===
(incomplete roll)

Year	Winner	Runner-up	Score
1954	(France) Angela Salvet	(France) Andrée Fréville-Varin	7–5, 6–4
1957	(France) Myrtil Brunerius Dubois	(France) Chantal Langanay	6–2, 3–6, 6–2
1962	(France) Chantal Langanay	(France) Paule Desbordes	6–1, 6–1
1963	(Belgium) Christiane Mercelis	(France) Anne-Marie Larue	6–4, 7–5
1964	(France) Chantal Langanay (2)	(France) Françoise Leclerc	6–0, 6–1
1965	(France) Rosie Darmon	(Spain) Carmen Coronado	8–6, 7–9, 6–4
1967	(France) Anne-Marie Maurey	(France) Janine Kalo	10–8, 6–3
1968	(United Kingdom) Winnie Shaw	(France) Rosie Darmon	6–4, 6–3
1969	(France) Rosie Darmon	(France) Anne-Marie Rouchon	Won ?
1970	(Mexico) Elena Subirats	(France) Marion Cristiani Proisy	6–2, 7–5
