= Jane Bartkowicz =

American tennis player

- Full name: Jane Marie Bartkowicz
- Country (sports): United States
- Born: April 16, 1949 (age 77) Hamtramck, Michigan, United States
- Turned pro: 1969 (1959 Amateur)
- Retired: 1974

Singles
- Career record: 199–86
- Career titles: 20

Grand Slam singles results
- French Open: 2R (1969)
- Wimbledon: 3R (1969, 1970)
- US Open: QF (1968, 1969)

Doubles
- Career record: 17–9
- Career titles: 3

Grand Slam doubles results
- French Open: QF (1969)
- Wimbledon: QF (1969)
- US Open: QF (1969, 1970)

Mixed doubles
- Career record: 0–2
- Career titles: 0

Grand Slam mixed doubles results
- Wimbledon: 2R (1969)
- US Open: 2R (1970)
Medal record
Representing United States
Olympic Games
Gold medal – first place	1968 Mexico City	Singles (Exhib.)
Silver medal – second place	1968 Mexico City	Singles (Demo.)
Silver medal – second place	1968 Mexico City	Doubles (Exhib.)
Silver medal – second place	1968 Mexico City	Mixed Doubles (Exhib.)
Bronze medal – third place	1968 Mexico City	Doubles (Demo.)
Bronze medal – third place	1968 Mexico City	Mixed Doubles (Demo.)

Jane Bartkowicz (born April 16, 1949), known during her career as Peaches Bartkowicz, is a former top tennis player from the United States. She was active from 1959 to 1974 and contested 33 career singles finals, and won 20 titles.

== Career ==
She played her first tournament in July 1963 at the Cincinnati Open, where she progressed to the final, losing to Stephanie DeFina. Bartkowicz was a protégé of Jean and Jerry Hoxie. Bartkowicz first title came at the 1966 Cincinnati Open in which she won both the singles and the doubles titles. She repeated this feat in 1967. In 1968, she won the singles title at Canadian International Championships in Toronto against Faye Urban.

In major tournaments, she was a quarterfinalist in singles at the US Open in 1968 and 1969 as well as a quarterfinalist in the women's doubles at the French Open in 1969, Wimbledon in 1969 and the US Open in 1969. She also reached the quarterfinals of women's doubles at the US Open in 1970. She played her final tournament and won her 20th career singles title on 12 July 1970 at the Swedish Open Championships in Båstad, Sweden against Ingrid Bentzer.

Bartkowicz had a 7–0 record in singles in Fed Cup play, and she was a member of the US team which won the cup in 1969.

As a junior, Peaches won 17 titles, including the girls' singles title at Wimbledon in 1964. She attended Queens College in New York City.

She was part of the Original 9 group of women tennis players who took part in the inaugural 1970 Virginia Slims Circuit. Also she was a pioneer in using a two-handed backhand.

Bartkowicz retired as a player in 1974. She has been enshrined in the United States Tennis Association/Midwest Hall of Fame. She was inducted into the Michigan Sports Hall of Fame in 2002. She was inducted into the National Polish American Sports Hall of Fame on June 24, 2010. Martha MacIsaac plays Bartkowicz in the 2017 film Battle of the Sexes. Her sister Plums Bartkowicz was a national No. 1 junior tennis player, but she did not pursue a professional career.

== Career finals ==
(incomplete roll)

Legend
Grand Slam	0
WTA Championships	0
Tier I	0
Tier II	0
Tier III	0
Tier IV & V	0

=== Singles 8 (6–2) ===
Result	No.	Date	Tournament	Surface	Opponent	Score
Loss	1.	1963	Cincinnati Open	Hard	(United States) Stephanie DeFina	7–5, 6–2
Win	2.	1966	Cincinnati Open	Hard	(United States) Peachy Kellmeyer	6–3, 6–3
Win	3.	1967	Cincinnati Open	Hard	(United States) Peachy Kellmeyer	6–3, 6–3
Win	4.	1967	Cincinnati Open	Hard	(United States) Patsy Rippy	6–4, 6–1
Win	5.	1967	U.S. Women’s Hardcourt Championships	Hard	(United States) Valerie Ziegenfuss	6–4, 6–4
Loss	6.	Oct 1968	Olympics Demonstration, Mexico	Clay	(West Germany) Helga Niessen	4–6, 3–6
Win	7.	1968	Olympics Exhibition, Mexico	Clay	(United States) Julie Heldman	6–3, 6–2
Win	8.	1968	Canadian International Championships	Clay	(Canada) Faye Urban	6–3, 6–3

=== Doubles 6 (3-3) ===
Titles by surface
Hard	2
Clay	1
Grass	0
Carpet	0

Result	No.	Date	Tournament	Surface	Partner	Opponents	Score
Win	1.	1966	Cincinnati Open	Hard	(United States) Peachy Kellmeyer	(United States) Patsy Rippy (United States) Becky Vest	6–1, 6–4
Win	2.	1967	Cincinnati Open	Hard	(United States) Patsy Rippy	(United States) Pixie Lamm (United States) Marilyn Aschner	6–3, 6–0
Loss	3.	May 27, 1968	La Jolla, California, US	Hard	(United States) Sue Shrader	(United States) Valerie Ziegenfuss (United States) Stephanie Grant	6–8, 7–9
Bronze	4.	October 1968	Olympics Demonstration, Mexico	Clay	(United States) Valerie Ziegenfuss	(Mexico) Lourdes Gongora (Mexico) Patricia Montaño	6–2, 6–1
Loss	5.	October 26, 1968	Olympics Exhibition, Mexico	Clay	(United States) Valerie Ziegenfuss	(France) Rosy Darmon (United States) Julie Heldman	0–6, 8–10
Loss	6.	March 18, 1971	Detroit, Michigan, US	Carpet	(Australia) Judy Tegart Dalton	(United States) Mary-Ann Eisel (United States) Valerie Ziegenfuss	6–2, 2–6, 3–6

=== Mixed doubles 2 (1-1) ===
Result	No.	Date	Tournament	Surface	Partner	Opponents	Score
Bronze	1.	October 1968	Olympics Demonstration, Mexico	Clay	(United States) Jim Osbourne	(France) Rosie Darmon (France) Pierre Darmon	6–4, 7–5
Silver	2.	October 1968	Olympics Exhibition, Mexico	Clay	(West Germany) Ingo Buding	(Soviet Union) Zaiga Jansone (Soviet Union) Vladimir Korotkov	5–7, 4–6
