= 1971 Virginia Slims of Oklahoma City =

- Date: January 29 – February 1
- Edition: 1st
- Draw: 16S / 4D
- Prize money: $12,500
- Surface: Carpet (Sportface) / indoor
- Location: Oklahoma City, Oklahoma, U.S.
- Venue: Frederickson Field House Arena

Champions

Singles
- (United States) Billie Jean King

Doubles
- (United States) Rosie Casals / (United States) Billie Jean King
Virginia Slims of Oklahoma City	· 1972 →

The 1971 Virginia Slims of Oklahoma City was a women's tennis tournament played on indoor carpet courts at the Frederickson Field House Arena in Oklahoma City, Oklahoma in the United States that was part of the 1971 WT Pro Tour. It was the inaugural edition of the tournament and was held from January 29 through February 1, 1971. First-seeded Billie Jean King won the singles title and earned $2,500 first-prize money.

== Finals ==
=== Singles ===
(United States) Billie Jean King defeated (United States) Rosie Casals 1–6, 7–6, 6–4

=== Doubles ===
(United States) Rosie Casals / (United States) Billie Jean King defeated (United States) Mary-Ann Eisel / (United States) Valerie Ziegenfuss 6–7, 6–0, 7–5

== Prize money ==
Event	W	F	SF	QF	Round of 16
Singles	$2,500	$1,800	$1,200	$600	$300
