= Gladys Heldman =

American tennis player and magazine publisher

- Born: May 13, 1922; New York City, U.S.
- Died: June 22, 2003 (aged 81); Santa Fe, New Mexico, U.S.
- Known for: Founder of World Tennis magazine
- Spouse: Julius Heldman
- Children: 2, including Julie
- Father: George Z. Medalie

Gladys Medalie Heldman (May 13, 1922 – June 22, 2003) was an American tennis player, promoter, manager and magazine publisher. She was the founder of World Tennis magazine. As a manager, she supported and represented Billie Jean King and eight other female tennis players: Rosie Casals, Judy Dalton, Julie Heldman, Kerry Melville, Peaches Bartkowicz, Kristy Pigeon, Nancy Richey, and Valerie Ziegenfuss. They were called the Houston Nine. She helped form the Virginia Slims Circuit in the early 1970s (the precursor of today's WTA Tour). She is a member of the International Tennis Hall of Fame and the International Jewish Sports Hall of Fame.

== Background ==
Heldman, the daughter of New York Court of Appeals judge George Z. Medalie, was born in New York City on May 13, 1922, and first became interested in tennis after marrying Julius Heldman, the United States Junior Champion of 1936. Gladys started playing tennis in 1946 after her two daughters were born. Gladys rose to a No. 1 ranking in Texas, as well as No. 2 in the Southwest; she even appeared at Wimbledon in 1954 and also competed in the U.S. Championships at Forest Hills. Her daughters, Carrie and Julie Heldman, had National Junior Rankings, and Julie was ranked as high as No. 5 in the World.

She was a graduate of Stanford University and a Phi Beta Kappa. Her two daughters went to Stanford as well. Gladys Heldman died at her home in Santa Fe, New Mexico on June 22, 2003, from a self-inflicted gunshot wound after she had been suffering from a terminal heart condition at age 81.

== World Tennis magazine ==
Gladys Heldman is best known for founding World Tennis magazine in 1953, and for promoting the women's game during the 1950s and 1960s. She worked with female tennis players to create a separate women's circuit in 1970. Female players received less prize money than their male counterparts, e.g. in 1968, the women's champion received £750, while the men's received £2000. Following the Pacific Southwest Championships's decision in September 1970 to pay male players eight times more money, with Gladys' organization, top players, including Billie Jean King, Rosie Casals, and her daughter Julie, formed a separate women's tour. With backing from Joe Cullman of Philip Morris, the first participants in the circuit, known as the "Houston Nine," played the first Virginia Slims Circuit tournament in Houston in late 1970. The players accepted $1 contracts from Heldman. The tournament was a success, and although the American players were temporarily suspended by the USLTA, the Virginia Slims Circuit became so popular that it eventually merged with the USLTA.

Heldman sold her magazine to CBS Publications in 1975 and was out of tennis politics by the middle 1970s.

Heldman was inducted into the International Tennis Hall of Fame in 1979, Texas Tennis Hall of Fame in 1988, ITA Women's Hall of Fame in 1998, and International Jewish Sports Hall of Fame in 2000.

== Portrayal in film ==
Sarah Silverman plays Heldman in the 2017 movie Battle of the Sexes.
