= Virginia Slims of Oklahoma City =

VS of Oklahoma City

Defunct tennis tournament
- Event name: VS of Oklahoma City
- Tour: WTA Tour
- Founded: 1971
- Abolished: 1972
- Editions: 2
- Surface: Carpet (Sportface)

The Virginia Slim of Oklahoma City is a defunct WTA Tour affiliated women's tennis tournament played from 1971 to 1972. It was held in Oklahoma City, Oklahoma in the United States and played on indoor Carpet courts.

== Results ==
=== Singles ===
Year	Champions	Runners-up	Score
1971	(United States) Billie Jean King	(United States) Rosemary Casals	1–6, 7–6, 6–4
1972	(United States) Rosemary Casals	(United States) Valerie Ziegenfuss	6–4, 6–1

=== Doubles ===
Year	Champions	Runners-up	Score
1971	(United States) Rosemary Casals (United States) Billie Jean King	(United States) Mary-Ann Eisel (United States) Valerie Ziegenfuss	6–7, 6–0, 7–5
1972	(United States) Rosemary Casals (United States) Billie Jean King	(Australia) Judy Tegart-Dalton (France) Françoise Dürr	6–7, 7–6, 6–2
