= Hans Nerell =

Swedish tennis player

- Full name: Hans Sven Torstensson Nerell
- Country (sports): Sweden
- Residence: Täby, Sweden
- Born: 27 September 1944 (age 80); Sweden
- Plays: Left-handed

Singles

Grand Slam singles results
- French Open: 2R (1969)
- Wimbledon: Q2 (1969)

Other tournaments
- Olympic Games: 1R (1968, demonstration)

Doubles

Grand Slam doubles results
- French Open: 2R (1969)

Other doubles tournaments
- Olympic Games: 1R (1968, demonstration)

Mixed doubles

Grand Slam mixed doubles results
- French Open: 1R (1969)
- Wimbledon: 1R (1969)

Other mixed doubles tournaments
- Olympic Games: 1R (1968, demonstration)

Hans Sven Torstensson Nerell (born 27 September 1944) is a former tennis player from Sweden.

== Tennis career ==
Nerell represented Sweden at the Olympic Games in Mexico City in 1968 when tennis was a demonstration sport. He lost in the first round of the singles event to the American, Herbert Fitzgibbon.

Nerell was a regular member of the Swedish Davis Cup team between 1968 and 1971, playing in six ties. His first appearance was against Rhodesia in the 1968 Davis Cup Europe Zone, first-round tie that was scheduled for Båstad, Sweden. A demonstrators protest, that became known as the Båstad riots, against the political situation in Rhodesia, caused the tie to be moved to Bandol, France. Nerell played both in the singles and doubles, losing his first singles match and winning the doubles with Ove Bengtson, as well as his second singles, coming back for a two set to zero deficit. His last Davis Cup match was in the 1971 Europe Zone first round against France.

Nerell played in the main draw of the singles, doubles and mixed doubles at the 1969 French Open. He lost in the second round of the singles and doubles and, with partner Margareta Strandberg, in the first round of the mixed doubles. He and Strandberg also qualified for the mixed doubles at the 1969 Wimbledon Championships, once again losing in the first round.

== See also ==
- List of Sweden Davis Cup team representatives
