= Patsy Rippy =

American tennis player

- Born: January 24, 1948; Oklahoma City, Oklahoma, U.S.
- Died: December 3, 2019 (aged 71); Utah, U.S.
- Education: Odessa College; University of Texas at El Paso
- Occupation: Teacher
- Spouse: Kenneth Bond
- Children: 2

Patsy Ann Rippy Bond (January 24, 1948 in Oklahoma City - December 3, 2019 in Utah) of Shawnee, Oklahoma, was an American amateur tennis player in the 1960s who represented her country in the Pan American Games. While a high school student she was ranked #1 in the Missouri Valley. In 1965 she advanced to the third round of the National Women's Championship at Forest Hills and was ranked #13 in the country.

== Tennis career ==
As a junior player, Rippy was selected as Shawnee High School Athlete of the Year during her senior year at Shawnee. In 1962, she paired with Paulette Verzin to win the USTA National Hard Court Champions Girls' 14 Doubles title. She was the runner-up to Bartkowicz at both the 1964 USTA National 16s and the 1966 USTA National 18s. She was a four-time winner of the Oklahoma high school state singles championship and led her team to a state championship. She graduated from Shawnee High School in 1966.

Rippy won the 1967 NCAA Championship while at Odessa College in Odessa, Texas. Also that year she represented the United States in the 1967 Pan-American Games in Winnipeg, Canada, winning a gold medal in doubles (with Jane Albert) and a silver in singles. She then went to the University of Texas at El Paso and was Southwest Intercollegiate Champion in both singles and doubles.

Also in 1967, she reached the singles final in Cincinnati before falling to Jane Bartkowicz, but paired with Bartkowicz to take the doubles title. In 1966 in Cincinnati, she reached the doubles final with Becky Vest and reached the singles semifinals.

Rippy later worked as a pro at several tennis clubs. She has been enshrined in the USTA/Missouri Valley Hall of Fame and the U.S. Tennis Hall of Fame.

== Personal life ==
Rippy was married to Kenneth Bond and had daughters, Becky and Karen, step-children Kasie, Kevin and Kelly. She was a third grade teacher in West Valley City, Utah. She died December 3, 2019, in Utah.

== Sources ==
- USTA/Missouri Valley
- Phillip S. Smith (2008). From Club Court to Center Court. ISBN 978-0-9712445-7-3.
