= Tennis at the 1973 Summer Universiade =

Tennis events were contested at the 1973 Summer Universiade in Moscow, Soviet Union.

== Medal summary ==
Event	Gold	Silver	Bronze
Men's Singles	Teimuraz Kakulia (URS)	Balázs Taróczy (HUN)	Kenichi Hirai (JPN)
Men's Doubles	Teimuraz Kakulia and Vladimir Korotkov (URS)	Bozhidar Pampulov and Matei Pampulov (BUL)	Bertalan Csoknyay and Balázs Taróczy (HUN)
Women's Singles	Olga Morozova (URS)	Kazuko Sawamatsu (JPN)	Janet Young (AUS)
Women's Doubles	Zaiga Jansone and Olga Morozova (URS)	Kayoko Fukuoka and Kazuko Sawamatsu (JPN)	Janice Metcalfe and Jane Stratton (USA)
Mixed Doubles	Olga Morozova and Teimuraz Kakulia (URS)	Kazuko Sawamatsu and Kenichi Hirai (JPN)	Janet Young and John Marks (AUS)

== Medal table ==
Rank	Nation	Gold	Silver	Bronze	Total
1	Soviet Union (URS)	5	0	0	5
2	Japan (JPN)	0	3	1	4
3	Hungary (HUN)	0	1	1	2
4	Bulgaria (BUL)	0	1	0	1
5	Australia (AUS)	0	0	2	2
6	United States (USA)	0	0	1	1
Totals (6 entries)		5	5	5	15

== See also ==
- Tennis at the Summer Universiade
