= Chris Bartkowicz =

American activist

Chris Bartkowicz is a state-licensed medical marijuana care-giver who was raided and arrested on the order of Denver area DEA agent Jeffrey Sweetin on February 12, 2010 after accepting an invitation by 9NEWS to do an interview about being a Colorado medical marijuana care-giver.

== Arrest ==
Sweetin's order to raid and arrest Bartkowitz came in defiance of President Barack Obama and United States Attorney General Eric Holder's directive not to enforce federal law against medical marijuana users and care-givers that operate in "clear and unambiguous compliance with state law". This directive echoed a campaign promise by then candidate Obama that he would stop prosecuting doctor authorized medical marijuana patients and caregivers because he felt that using federal resources to circumvent state law on the issue of medical marijuana was a poor use of federal resources. Despite the fact that Colorado voters amended the state constitution to allow medical marijuana, Sweetin proclaimed "We're still going to continue to investigate and arrest people... Technically, every dispensary in the state is in blatant violation of federal law," he said. "The time is coming when we go into a dispensary, we find out what their profit is, we seize the building and we arrest everybody. They're violating federal law; they're at risk of arrest and imprisonment".

== Controversy ==
Several days after the arrest, Sweetin revised his argument and claimed that Bartkowicz was violating state law because he was in possession of 224 marijuana plants for 12 registered patients, while state law only allowed for a caregiver to have 6 plants and 2 ounces of marijuana per registered patient. This same argument was echoed by prosecuting attorney David Gaouette.

While Sweetin and Gaouette both argue that Colorado state law limits Bartkowicz to 6 plants and 2 ounces per patient as a care-giver, the wording of the Colorado state constitution never states a maximum number of plants that a care-giver may possess. The state constitution only sets a limit on the number of plants that a patient may possess.

== Local response ==
In response to the incident, Colorado attorney Rob Corry issued a formal complaint against the DEA and DOJ agents involved in the incident. He states that the DEA is trying to scare medical marijuana users and care-givers even though they are complying with state law and that these actions are a clear violation of the October 19, 2009 Department of Justice guidelines instructing federal agents not to use federal resources to prosecute medical marijuana users who are in compliance with state law.

Colorado medical marijuana advocate and head organizer of a February 18, 2010 protest aimed to notify President Obama and raise public awareness of the DEA's recent actions, Brian Vicente, questions the motives of those involved "I think the U.S. Attorney and the DEA view marijuana laws as a continuing employment act. It gives them something to do, and they're afraid that if they were to recognize the will of the voters, they'd be out of work. So I question the motivation for prosecuting these kinds of individuals. I think it's driven by their own need for job security."

== Congressional response ==
Colorado Representative Jared Polis wrote to Attorney General Holder and President Obama requesting clarification on the issue of whether Sweetin's comments that the DEA will "arrest everybody" is United States policy regarding medical marijuana. Polis is one of few congressman to take public notice of the DEA's failure to respect state law on the issue of medical marijuana even though a January 18, 2010 ABC poll shows that 81 percent of Americans support legalizing medical marijuana.

== See also ==
- Medical cannabis in the United States
