= Jun Kamiwazumi =

Japanese tennis player (born 1947)

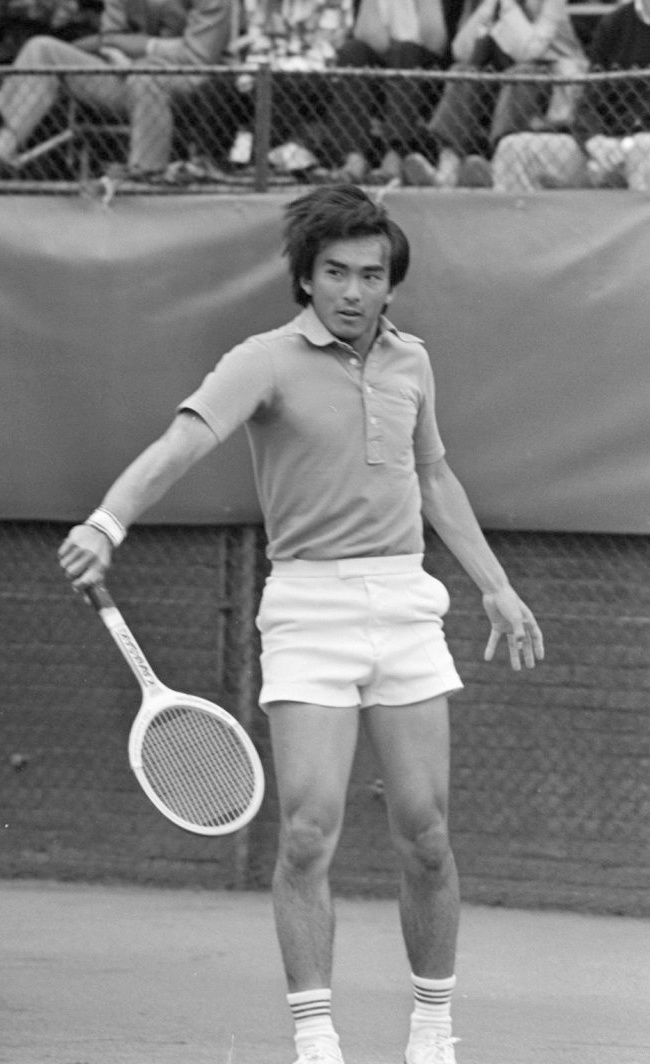
- Country (sports): Japan
- Born: 1 October 1947 (age 78) Ishikawa, Japan
- Plays: Right-handed (one-handed backhand)
- Coach: Don Tregonning
- Prize money: $289,416

Singles
- Career titles: 0
- Highest ranking: No. 78 (2 June 1975)

Grand Slam singles results
- Australian Open: 2R (1968)
- French Open: 2R (1973, 1974, 1975)
- Wimbledon: 2R (1972, 1975)
- US Open: 3R (1973)

Other tournaments
- Olympic Games: QF (1968-e)

Doubles
- Career titles: 0
- Highest ranking: No. 727 (16 July 1984)

Grand Slam doubles results
- Australian Open: 2R (1968)
- French Open: 4R (1971)
- Wimbledon: 2R (1973, 1974, 1975)
- US Open: 2R (1973)

Other doubles tournaments
- Olympic Games: 1R (1968-d, 1968-e)

Grand Slam mixed doubles results
- French Open: QF (1973)
Medal record
Men's tennis
Representing Japan
Summer Universiade
Silver medal – second place	1967 Tokyo	Singles
Gold medal – first place	1970 Turin	Doubles

Jun Kamiwazumi (神和住 純, Kamiwazumi Jun; born 1 October 1947) is a former Japan Davis Cup team player and tour tennis player.

A native of Ishikawa Prefecture, Kamiwazumi competed in sixteen Grand Slam tennis events between 1972 and 1976. His best singles result was reaching the final 32 in the 1973 U.S. Open. His biggest grand slam tourney win was a first round defeat of No. 7 seed Stan Smith in the 1974 French Open. In doubles, he reached the round of 16 at the 1971 French Open, partnering compatriot Toshiro Sakai.

Kamiwazumi's biggest grand prix result was reaching the semi-finals in Hilversum in 1971, where despite going up two sets he lost the match to Ross Case. The following year at the same event he reached the quarter-finals, as he did in Cincinnati in 1972, Cincinnati and Hilversum both in 1974, and the Tokyo Outdoor in 1979. He finished with a tour win–loss singles record of 55 and 93 and a career-high ranking of World No. 78, which he reached in February, 1975. The right-handed resident of Tokyo best doubles results were reaching the final of the Osaka Grand Prix in 1973, partnering Aussie legend Ken Rosewall, as well as the Denver WCT final in 1974, partnering Mark Cox.

Kamiwazumi is tied for the most years played on the Japanese Davis Cup team, 12, a record he shares with Gouichi Motomura. He posted 12 wins against 8 losses in singles and went 8 and 8 in doubles, in a total of 20 ties played in. Kamiwazumi partnered Sakai against Mal Anderson and Geoff Masters in the 1972 Eastern Zone, Zone A final. Australia won the tie 4–1 in what turned out to be Japan's final appearance in a zonal final round until the format was changed to having a World Group, beginning in 1981.

After retirement Kamiwazumi became a tennis television commentator, university lecturer, television personality, and Japanese Davis Cup coach.

== Career finals ==
=== Doubles (2 losses) ===
Result	W/L	Date	Tournament	Surface	Partner	Opponents	Score
Loss	0–1	Oct 1973	Osaka, Japan	Clay	(Australia) Ken Rosewall	(United States) Jeff Borowiak (United States) Tom Gorman	4–6, 6–7
Loss	0–2	Apr 1974	Denver WCT, US	Carpet	(United Kingdom) Mark Cox	(United States) Arthur Ashe (United States) Roscoe Tanner	3–6, 6–7
