= Rosie Reyes =

Mexican tennis player (1939–2024)

- Full name: Rosa María Reyes
- Country (sports): Mexico; France
- Born: 23 March 1939 Mexico City, Mexico
- Died: 4 January 2024 (aged 84) Mexico City, Mexico
- Plays: Right-handed

Grand Slam singles results
- French Open: SF (1959)
- Wimbledon: QF (1957)

Other tournaments
- Olympic Games: QF (1968-d, 1968-e)

Grand Slam doubles results
- Australian Open: SF (1965)
- French Open: W (1958)
- Wimbledon: SF (1957, 1958, 1959)

Other doubles tournaments
- Olympic Games: W (1968-e)

Grand Slam mixed doubles results
- French Open: F (1974)
- Wimbledon: 3R (1959)

Rosa María Reyes Darmon (née Reyes; 23 March 1939 – 4 January 2024) was a Mexican tennis player who was active in the 1950s and 1960s.

== Career ==
Most of her success came on clay on which she won the women's doubles title at the 1958 French Championships with countrywoman Yola Ramírez. She also reached the finals at the same event in 1957 and 1959.

In singles, her best result at a Grand Slam tournament was reaching the semifinals of the 1959 French Championships in which she lost in straight sets to Zsuzsa Körmöczy of Hungary.

Reyes competed in the women's doubles event at 1968 Summer Olympics, where tennis was reintroduced as an exhibition and demonstration event. Partnering Julie Heldman, she won the gold medal in the exhibition event, held in Mexico City, and the silver medal in the demonstration event, held in Guadalajara.

== Personal life and death ==
Reyes married tennis player Pierre Darmon on 28 January 1960. She died from a lung disease at her home in Mexico City, on 4 January 2024, at the age of 84.

== Grand Slam finals ==
=== Doubles (1 title, 2 runners-up) ===
Result	Year	Championship	Surface	Partner	Opponents	Score
Loss	1957	French Championships	Clay	(Mexico) Yola Ramírez	(United Kingdom) Shirley Bloomer (United States) Darlene Hard	5–7, 6–4, 5–7
Win	1958	French Championships	Clay	(Mexico) Yola Ramírez	(Australia) Mary Bevis Hawton (Australia) Thelma Coyne Long	6–4, 7–5
Loss	1959	French Championships	Clay	(Mexico) Yola Ramírez	(South Africa) Sandra Reynolds (South Africa) Renée Schuurman	6–2, 0–6, 1–6

=== Mixed doubles (1 runner-up) ===
Result	Year	Championship	Surface	Partner	Opponents	Score
Loss	1974	French Open	Clay	(Mexico) Marcello Lara	(Czechoslovakia) Martina Navratilova (Colombia) Iván Molina	3–6, 3–6

== Olympic finals ==
=== Doubles (1 gold, 1 silver) ===
Result	Year	Championship	Surface	Partner	Opponents	Score
Silver	1968 (Demonstration)	Mexico City Olympics	Clay	(United States) Julie Heldman	(Germany) Edda Buding (Germany) Helga Niessen	3–6, 4–6
Gold	1968 (Exhibition)	Mexico City Olympics	Clay	(United States) Julie Heldman	(United States) Peaches Bartkowicz (United States) Valerie Ziegenfuss	6–0, 10–8

=== Mixed Doubles (1 bronze) ===
Result	Year	Championship	Surface	Partner	Opponents	Score
Bronze	1968 (Exhibition)	Mexico City Olympics	Clay	(France) Pierre Darmon	Tied	Did Not Play

Rosie Reyes Darmon and Pierre Darmon lost in the semifinals to Peaches Bartkowicz and Ingo Buding 6–3, 2–6, 1–6. As the exhibition tournament did not feature a bronze medal play-off match, both beaten semifinal teams received bronze medals.
