= Suzana Petersen =

Brazilian tennis player

- Full name: Suzana Petersen Gesteira
- Country (sports): Brazil
- Born: 14 October 1947 (age 79) Cachoeira do Sul, Rio Grande do Sul, Brazil

Grand Slam singles results
- French Open: R2 (1969)
- Wimbledon: R2 (1969)
- US Open: R2 (1969)

Grand Slam doubles results
- French Open: R3 (1968, 1970)
- Wimbledon: R2 (1969, 1970)

Suzana Petersen Gesteira (born 14 October 1947), is a Brazilian former tennis player. She competed at the 1968 Summer Olympics, where tennis was a demonstration and exhibition sport, in the exhibition events. Together with Ecuadorian María Eugenia Guzmán she finished third in the women's doubles exhibition event. Petersen also finished third in the women's singles and mixed doubles (with Teimuraz Kakulia of the Soviet Union) exhibition events, making her one of the "top Brazilian female players". Prior to Laura Pigossi and Luisa Stefani's bronze medal at the 2020 Summer Olympics, Petersen was the only Brazilian player to finish in the top three of an Olympic tennis event.

== Career ==
=== Early career ===
Petersen, from Cachoeira do Sul, Rio Grande do Sul, was trained by her father Ernesto Petersen at the Clube Sogipa in Porto Alegre.

=== 1968: Olympics ===
Petersen represented Brazil in the exhibition tennis events at the 1968 Summer Olympics in Mexico City. Tennis was included as both a demonstration and an exhibition sport, with the exhibition tournament restricted to players under the age of 21.

In the exhibition women's singles event, Petersen finished in third place. She also earned third-place finishes in the women's doubles, partnering Ecuador's María Eugenia Guzmán, and in the mixed doubles alongside Soviet player Teimuraz Kakulia. These performances represented the best Olympic tennis results by a Brazilian player until Laura Pigossi and Luisa Stefani won the country's first official Olympic tennis medal, a bronze in the women's doubles at the 2020 Summer Olympics.

=== 1970 ===
Petersen defeated Chile's Ana María Arias 5-7, 6-3, 8-6 to win the 1970 Parioli tournament.

== Grand Slam tournaments ==
She participated at Grand Slam tournaments at the 1968 French Open, 1970 French Open, 1969 Wimbledon Championships, 1970 Wimbledon Championships and 1969 US Open in sigles. Her best results came in 1969, when she reached the second round at each tournament.

In doubles, she participated at the 1968 French Open, 1970 French Open, 1969 Wimbledon Championships and 1970 Wimbledon Championships, with her best results being reaching the third round of the French Open on both occasions and the Wimbledon Chmapionships second round on both occasions.

== Federation Cup ==
Petersen represented Brazil in the 1968 Federation Cup, one of the country's first appearances in the competition. Brazil received a bye into the second round, where it faced Australia at the Stade Roland Garros in Paris on 22 May 1968. Australia, led by Margaret Court and Kerry Melville, defeated Brazil 3–0 on clay courts.

Petersen played both the singles and doubles rubbers. In the opening singles match, she was defeated by Margaret Court, 0–6, 0–6. Maria Cristina Borba Dias then lost to Kerry Melville, 2–6, 1–6, giving Australia an unassailable lead. In the doubles rubber, Petersen partnered Borba Dias but the Brazilian pair lost to Court and Melville, 0–6, 2–6.
