= Valerie Ziegenfuss =

American tennis player (born 1949)

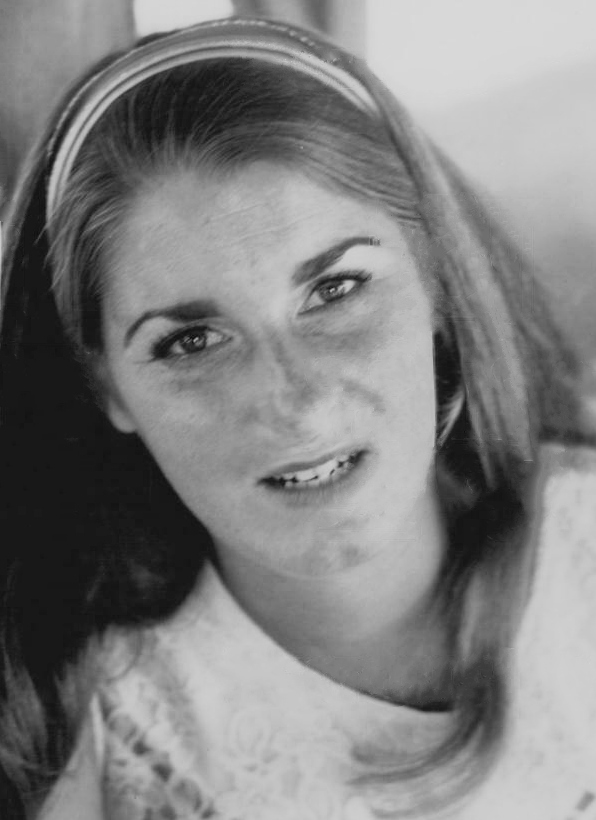
- Ziegenfuss in 1973
- Country (sports): United States
- Residence: U.S.
- Born: June 29, 1949 (age 77) San Diego, California
- Height: 5 ft 8 in (1.73 m)
- Plays: Right-handed

Singles
- Career record: 25–44

Grand Slam singles results
- French Open: 4R (1972)
- Wimbledon: 3R (1970, 1973, 1975, 1976)
- US Open: 3R (1969, 1975)

Other tournaments
- Olympic Games: 1R (1968-d, 1968-e)

Doubles
- Career record: 45–42
- Career titles: 6

Grand Slam doubles results
- French Open: 3R (1971)
- Wimbledon: SF (1969, 1971)
- US Open: SF (1969. 1971)

Mixed doubles
- Career record: 10–9
- Career titles: 0

Grand Slam mixed doubles results
- French Open: QF (1976)
- Wimbledon: 4R (1970, 1971)
- US Open: 2R (1972)

Other mixed doubles tournaments
- Olympic Games: QF (1968-d)
Medal record
Representing United States
Olympic Games
Silver medal – second place	1968 Mexico City	Doubles (Exhib.)
Bronze medal – third place	1968 Mexico City	Doubles (Demo.)

Valerie Jean Bradshaw (née Ziegenfuss; June 29, 1949) is an American former professional tennis player. She started as an amateur player at the beginning of the 1970s, then turned professional.

She is most famous for being one of the Original 9 with eight of her fellow players, who rebelled against the United States Tennis Association in 1970. Their actions brought about the creation of the Virginia Slims Circuit, which was the basis for the WTA Tour.

During her career, she reached the fourth round at the French Open (in 1972) and the US Open on two occasions (1969 and 1975). She reached one singles final at the Virginia Slims of Oklahoma in 1972. After winning two rounds of qualifying, she defeated 5th seeded Helen Gourlay, No. 2 seed Francoise Durr, and Judy Dalton (seeded 6th) and then lost to Rosie Casals.

She had far more success in doubles tournaments, with 12 doubles final appearances, including six victories.

She won a bronze medal in doubles in the 1968 Olympics in Mexico City with Jane Bartkowicz.

== Early life ==
Ziegenfuss was born and raised in San Diego, California.

== Career review ==
=== Original 9 ===
In 1970, the top women tennis players started to become frustrated at the lack of equality within tennis in terms of prize money on offer for male and female players. The publisher Gladys Heldman, founder of World Tennis magazine, offered $5,000 of her own money, which enabled the players to negotiate their own contracts. Ziegenfuss and the other players, including Billie Jean King and Rosie Casals, signed $1 contracts in the summer of 1970 and formed the Virginia Slims Circuit.

== WTA Tour finals ==
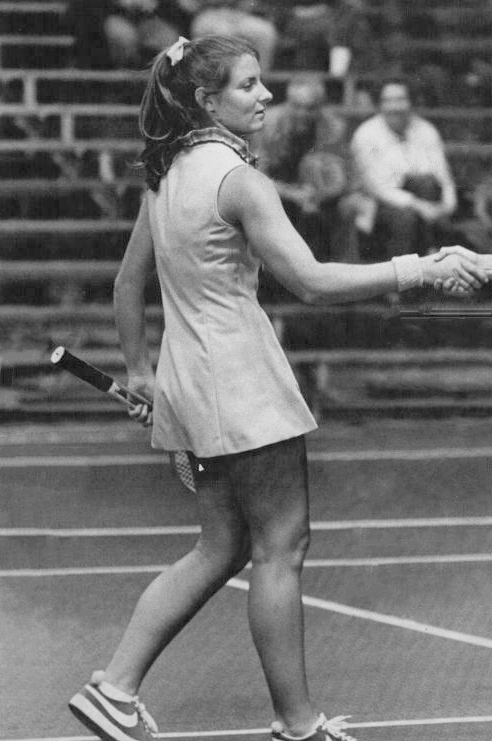
Ziegenfuss in 1969

=== Singles 1 ===
Legend
Grand Slam	0
WTA Championships	0
Tier I	0
Tier II	0
Tier III	0
Tier IV & V	0

Result	No.	Date	Tournament	Surface	Opponent	Score
Loss	1.	Feb 1972	Oklahoma City, Oklahoma, U.S.	Hard	(United States) Rosie Casals	4–6, 1–6

=== Doubles 10 (6–4) ===
Legend
Grand Slam	0
WTA Championships	0
Tier I	0
Tier II	0
Tier III	0
Tier IV & V	0

Result	No.	Date	Tournament	Surface	Partner	Opponents	Score
Win	1.	May 1967	La Jolla, California, U.S.	Hard	(United States) Stephanie Grant	(United States) Peaches Bartkowicz (United States) Sue Shrader	8–6, 9–7
Loss	2.	Oct 1968	Mexico City Olympics (Exhibition), Mexico	Clay	(United States) Peaches Bartkowicz	(France) Rosy Darmon (United States) Julie Heldman	0–6, 8–10
Win	3.	1969	Cincinnati, Ohio, U.S.	Hard	(Australia) Kerry Harris	(United States) Emilie Burrer (United States) Pam Richmond	6–3, 9–7
Win	4.	Mar 1971	Detroit, Michigan, U.S.	Carpet	(United States) Mary-Ann Eisel	(United States) Peaches Bartkowicz (Australia) Judy Tegart Dalton	2–6, 6–2, 6–3
Win	5.	Feb 1972	Washington, D.C., U.S.	Carpet	(United States) Wendy Overton	(Australia) Judy Tegart Dalton (France) Françoise Dürr	7–5, 6–2
Loss	6.	Jun 1972	Hamburg, Germany	Clay	(United States) Wendy Overton	(West Germany) Helga Masthoff (West Germany) Heide Orth	6–3, 6–2, 0–6
Loss	7.	Jan 1973	San Francisco, California, U.S.	Hard	(United States) Wendy Overton	(Australia) Margaret Court (Australia) Lesley Hunt	1–6, 5–7
Win	8.	Nov 1976	Johannesburg, South Africa	Hard	(United States) Laura duPont	(South Africa) Yvonne Vermaak (South Africa) Elizabeth Vlotman	6–1, 6–4
Loss	9.	Jan 1977	Washington, D.C., U.S.	Carpet	(United States) Kristien Shaw	(Czechoslovakia) Martina Navratilova (Netherlands) Betty Stöve	5–7, 2–6
Win	10.	Nov 1978	Buenos Aires, Argentina	Clay	(France) Françoise Dürr	(United States) Laura duPont (Czechoslovakia) Regina Maršíková	1–6, 6–4, 6–3

== Notes ==
- The Original 9 featured Billie Jean King, Rosie Casals, Peaches Bartkowickz, Nancy Richey, Kerry Melville, Judy Dalton, Julie Heldman and Kristy Pigeon.
- The Virginia Slims Circuit was the name of the modern day circuit WTA circuit before the formation of the Women's Tennis Association in 1973. It became the WTA Tour in 1988.
