= Ana María Ycaza =

Ecuadorian tennis player

- Country (sports): Ecuador
- Born: 7 May 1951 (age 74)
Medal record
Pan American Games
Silver medal – second place	1967 Winnipeg	Women's doubles

Ana María Ycaza (born 7 May 1951) is a former Ecuadorian tennis player.

A native of Guayaquil, Ycaza played on tour in the 1960s and 1970s. Her younger brother Ricardo was a Davis Cup player and their father Carlos was Ecuador's inaugural Davis Cup captain in 1961.

Ycaza was a doubles silver medalist partnering María Eugenia Guzmán at the 1967 Pan American Games and competed in the demonstration events at the 1968 Summer Olympics in Mexico City.

In 1972 she was a member of the Ecuador Federation Cup team as they competed in the event for first time. She won one singles and two doubles rubbers, from her four ties. Ecuador didn't feature in the competition again for another 20 years, so this was Ycaza's only Federation Cup appearance.
