= Vicente Zarazúa =

Mexican tennis player (1944–2025)

Vicente Zarazúa (August 27, 1944 – November 14, 2025) was a Mexican tennis player. He played during the 1960s and 70s, and his best achievement was winning gold medals at the demonstration and exhibition tennis tournaments at the 1968 Summer Olympics.

== Biography ==
Vicente Zarazúa was born at Tacubaya, Mexico on August 27, 1944. Both his parents, who moved to Mexico City from Guanajuato, were amateur tennis players and took part in interclub competitions, with his mother, Rosario, also winning the national championships. Both his older brothers, Federico and José María, played amateur tennis at the interclub level.

As a junior, Vicente had a winning streak at the national level that stretched from 1959 to 1962, winning during this period the Mexican national youth championships four times each in singles, boy doubles, and mixed doubles. At the international level, he reached the finals of 1959 Orange Bowl in singles (lost to Charlie Pasarell) and, in 1962, won this tournament in doubles with Joaquín Loyo-Mayo.

Zarazúa played for the Mexico Davis Cup team beginning in 1964, overall during his career having taken part in 16 ties. He won 14 rubbers, mostly in doubles, and lost 9. During these ties he achieved some of his best results, beating, together with the national team, the Americans in 1969 and then Australians in 1975. In both cases, he won the doubles rubbers (with Rafael Osuna in 1969 and with Raúl Ramírez in 1975). Another one of his highest achievements was the double victory (with Osuna) at the demonstration and exhibition Olympic tennis tournaments in Mexico in 1968.

In 2008, Zarazúa was introduced to the Hall of Fame of Immortals by the Mexican Council for Sport and Professional Spectacles (COMEDEP).

Zarazúa died on November 14, 2025, at the age of 81.
