= Julie Heldman =

American tennis player

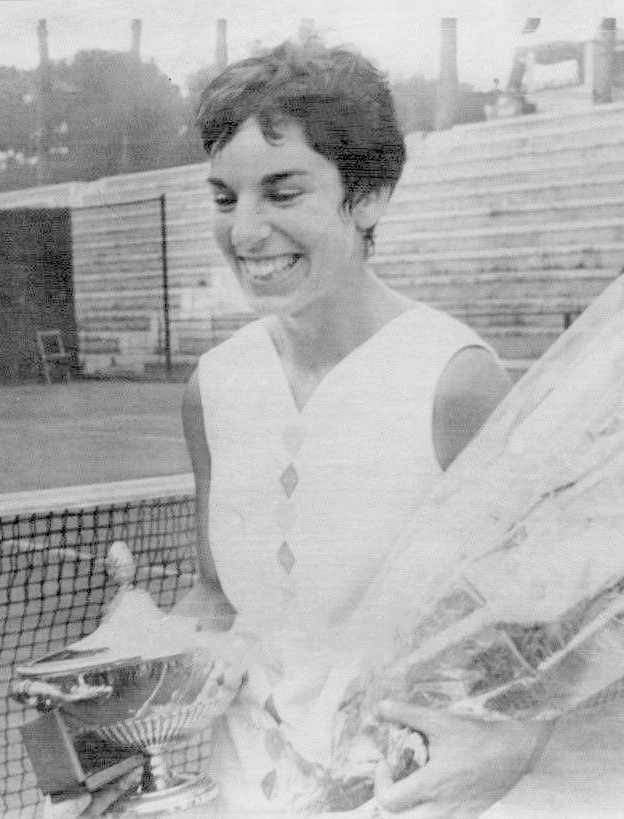
- Heldman winning the 1969 Italian Open
- Full name: Julie Medalie Heldman
- Country (sports): United States
- Residence: Santa Monica, California
- Born: December 8, 1945 (age 80) Berkeley, California, US
- Height: 5 ft 7 in (1.70 m)
- Turned pro: 1970
- Retired: 1975

Singles
- Career record: 70–31
- Highest ranking: No. 5 (1969 and 1974)

Grand Slam singles results
- Australian Open: SF (1974)
- French Open: SF (1970)
- Wimbledon: QF (1969)
- US Open: SF (1974)

Doubles
- Career record: 39–22

Grand Slam doubles results
- Australian Open: SF (1974)
- Wimbledon: QF (1969, 1974)
- US Open: QF (1968, 1969)
Medal record
Maccabiah Games
Gold medal – first place	1969 Israel	Singles
Gold medal – first place	1969 Israel	Women's doubles
Gold medal – first place	1969 Israel	Mixed doubles

Julie Heldman (born December 8, 1945) is an American tennis player who won 22 singles titles. In 1968 and 1969, she was ranked No. 2 in the U.S. She was Canadian National 18 and Under Singles Champion at age 12, U.S. Champion in Girls' 15 Singles and Girls' 18 Singles, Italian Open Singles Champion, Canadian Singles and Doubles Champion, and U.S. Clay Court Doubles Champion. She won three medals at the 1968 Mexico City Olympics, and three gold medals at the 1969 Maccabiah Games.

In 2018, Heldman published the memoir Driven, A Daughter's Odyssey.

== Early life ==
Heldman was born in Berkeley, California, the daughter of Julius and Gladys Heldman. Julius was the 1936 USA National Junior Champion. He was a scientist and a leading amateur player, and Gladys Heldman was the founder, editor, and publisher of World Tennis magazine and the founder of the women's pro tour in 1970. Heldman is Jewish. Her older sister, Carrie, was also a competitive tennis player.

== Education ==
Heldman received her Bachelor of Arts from Stanford University in 1966, and her Juris Doctor from UCLA Law School in 1981, where she was a UCLA Law Review editor and was Law School Graduate of the Year, as well as UCLA Graduate Woman of the Year.

== Tennis career ==
=== Early career ===
Heldman started playing tennis when she was age 8 and won her first national title (the Canadian 18 and under singles) at age 12, in 1957. She won the US National Girls 15 & under singles title in 1960 and the US National Girls 18 and under title in 1963.

While a student at Stanford University in 1964, Heldman reached the national collegiate singles and doubles finals.

In 1965, Heldman reached the Italian championships semi-finals, won the Canadian National women's singles title, and was the finalist in the US National Clay Courts.

=== Olympics ===
In 1968, Heldman won a gold, a silver, and a bronze medal at the Mexico City Olympic Games when tennis was a demonstration sport Also in 1968, she won the South American mixed doubles with partner Herb Fitzgibbon.

=== Later career ===
In early 1969, Heldman had two wins over world number one Margaret Court, one win over U.S. number one Nancy Richey, and two wins over the 1968 U.S. Open champion Virginia Wade.

Heldman's most important title was the Italian Open, where she beat Ann Jones in the semis and Kerry Melville in the final.

During her career, Heldman reached the semifinals of three Grand Slam singles championships: the 1970 French Open, the 1974 Australian Open, and the 1974 US Open.

She also won doubles title at the US Women's Clay Court Championships and at the Canadian Open in 1974.

She was one of the Original 9, which was a group of female tennis players who joined the Virginia Slims Circuit, even with the risk of suspension for doing so. The Virginia Slims Circuit eventually led to the creation of the WTA Tour.

== Women's pro tour ==
In September 1970, Heldman's mother Gladys ran the first Virginia Slims tournament in Houston where nine top women players (the “Original 9”) competed. At the end of the tournament, the Original 9 voted to have Gladys run a women’s pro tour, which she established and ran from 1970 through 1973. Julie Heldman was one of the Original 9 players who competed in the Houston event, and she played on the tour until she retired in 1975.

=== Federation Cup ===
Heldman played on the US Federation Cup teams that captured the world team championship in 1966 and 1969. She also played on the U.S. Federation Cup teams in 1970, 1974, and 1975. She was the captain of the team in 1975. Her career win–loss record in Federation Cup competition was 21–9.

=== Maccabiah Games ===
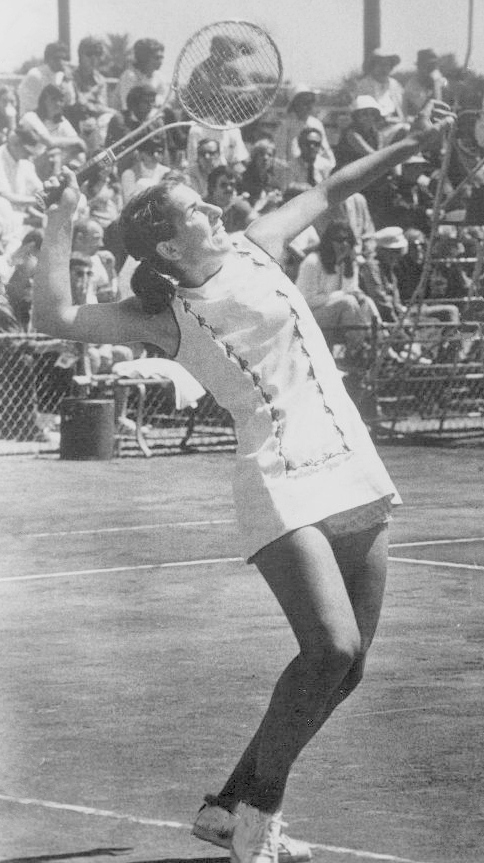
Heldman in 1972

Heldman won three gold medals at the 1969 Maccabiah Games in Israel, in singles, doubles (partnering Marilyn Aschner), and mixed doubles.

=== Other career highlights ===
- Ranked in the USTA Top 10, 1963–65, 1968–69, 1971–75
- Ranked in the World Top 10, 1969–70, 1973–74
- Virginia Slims Professional Tour, 1971–75
- U.S. Wightman Cup Team Member, 1969–71, 1974; Most Valuable Player, 1969; Team Captain, 1974–75
- U.S. Bonne Bell Cup Team Member, 1973–1974; Most Valuable Player, Team Captain, 1974
- Winner of USTA Service Bowl 1975

== Halls of Fame ==
Heldman was inducted into the:

- Stanford Athletics Hall of Fame, 1978
- National Jewish Sports Hall of Fame, 1989
- ITA Women's Hall of Fame, 1998
- International Jewish Sports Hall of Fame, 2001
- USTA Eastern Tennis Hall of Fame, 2006
- International Tennis Hall of Fame, 2021

== Personal life ==
After Heldman ended her playing career, she worked as a television commentator and journalist, with CBS, NBC, PBS, and HBO at the US Open and Wimbledon from 1973 to 1978. She published articles about tennis in various magazines, including World Tennis and Seventeen. She was the first woman to cover a men's tennis event (the 1976 Avis Challenge Cup).

In 1981, Heldman married Bernie Weiss, and their daughter Amy was born in 1987. In 1985, Heldman became president and co-chair of Signature Eyewear. Heldman retired in 2000 because she suffered a breakdown that lasted nearly 15 years.

== Memoir ==
Heldman's memoir Driven, A Daughter's Odyssey was published in August 2018. She writes “the book became a mainstay of my existence. It has profoundly contributed to my well-being.” The book has been praised by former players and critics alike. Tennis historian Steve Flink called it "mandatory reading." Chris Evert called it a "must read."

== Portrayal in film ==
Bridey Elliott plays Heldman in the 2017 movie Battle of the Sexes.

== WTA Tour finals ==
=== Singles 1 ===
Legend
Grand Slam	0
WTA Championships	0
Tier I	0
Tier II	0
Tier III	0
Tier IV & V	0
Olympic Games	0

Result	No.	Date	Tournament	Surface	Opponent	Score
Loss	1.	Oct 1968	Mexico City Olympics (Exhibition), Mexico	Clay	(United States) Peaches Bartkowicz	3–6, 2–6

=== Doubles 2 (1–1) ===
Legend
Grand Slam	0
WTA Championships	0
Tier I	0
Tier II	0
Tier III	0
Tier IV & V	1
Olympic Games	0

Result	No.	Date	Tournament	Surface	Partner	Opponents	Score
Loss	1.	Oct 1968	Mexico City Olympics (Demonstration), Mexico	Clay	(France) Rosy Darmon	(West Germany) Edda Buding (West Germany) Helga Niessen	3–6, 4–6
Win	2.	Oct 1968	Mexico City Olympics (Exhibition), Mexico	Clay	(France) Rosy Darmon	(United States) Peaches Bartkowicz (United States) Valerie Ziegenfuss	6–0, 10–8

== See also ==
- List of select Jewish tennis players
