= Vladimir Korotkov (tennis) =

Soviet tennis player (1948–2025)

- Full name: Vladimir Viktorovich Korotkov
- Country (sports): Soviet Union
- Born: 23 April 1948 Moscow, Russian SFSR, USSR
- Died: 14 June 2025 (aged 77)
- Plays: Right-handed

Singles

Grand Slam singles results
- French Open: 2R (1972)
- Wimbledon: 3R (1968)
- US Open: 2R (1970)
- French Open Junior: W (1966)
- Wimbledon Junior: W (1965, 1966)
- Olympic Games: SF (1968)

Doubles

Grand Slam doubles results
- French Open: 3R (1971)
- Wimbledon: 2R (1970)
- US Open: 1R

Other doubles tournaments
- Olympic Games: SF (1968)

Mixed doubles
- Olympic Games: W (1968)
Medal record
Representing Soviet Union
Summer Universiade
Gold medal – first place	1973 Moscow	Doubles

Vladimir Viktorovich Korotkov (23 April 1948 – 14 June 2025) was a Soviet tennis player who won three Junior Grand Slam tournaments, Wimbledon Boys Singles in 1965, 1966 and the French Juniors in 1966. He also won (with Zaiga Jansone) the mixed doubles at the 1968 Summer Olympics where tennis was a "demonstration sport". He won the men's doubles event at the 1973 Summer Universiade and the 1977 USSR singles championship. From 1981 until his retirement in 1996, Korotkov was coaching at several sports clubs.

== Playing career ==
Vladimir Korotkov started playing tennis at the age of five. His first coach was Tamara Dubrovina at the sports club CSKA Moscow. Later Korotkov graduated from the Central State Institute for Physical Culture.

In 1963, Korotkov won the Soviet youth championships in mixed doubles with Marina Chuvyrina, and the next year he won the senior Soviet championships in men's doubles with Vyacheslav Egorov. The same year, he reached the finals of the juniors of Wimbledon Championships, losing to Ismail El Shafei. In 1965, though, he returned to the finals of the Wimbledon juniors, and this time won. In 1966, he became a two-time Wimbledon juniors champion and added to it the title of French juniors champion. In 1966 he also won his second Soviet championships in men's doubles (once again with Egorov).

In 1968, Korotkov was included in the Soviet team at the 1968 Summer Olympics in Mexico. There were only demonstration and exhibition tennis events played at the Olympics, and Korotkov who won a gold at the mixed doubles exhibition event and two bronze medals at men's singles and doubles is not considered an Olympic champion.

During the rest of his playing career, Korotkov repeatedly reached the finals of the Soviet championships in men's doubles (last time in 1979) and in mixed doubles (1970). His highest achievement at this level was winning the 1977 Soviet championships in singles where he defeated Vadim Borisov in the final. He also won several All-Union tennis tournaments of lesser rank. From 1966 to 1977, he was a part of the Soviet Top 10 list of players, reaching no. 3 in 1973.

Korotkov successfully played in international amateur tournaments, winning a number of international tournaments played in the Soviet Union, including doubles event at the 1973 Summer Universiade. He was a part of the Soviet Union Davis Cup team between 1969 and 1974, winning 10 out of 21 rubbers. In 1974, he won the European Zone with the Soviet team but lost to the India Davis Cup team in the inter-zonal semifinals. After the start of the Open Era, Korotkov played in some open tournaments with limited success; his best results were the fourth round of the Italian Open in 1969 (defeating Charlie Pasarell and Owen Davidson on his way) and in 1973 (defeating Cliff Richey). He also reached the third round at the first Open Wimbledon Championships in 1968.

== Coaching career ==
After finishing his active playing career, Korotkov became a coach. He worked at several sports clubs between 1981 and 1996, including Moscow Tennis Academy in 1993–1994.

Korotkov was nominated repeatedly for the spot at the Russian Tennis Hall of Fame, but every time lost, first to Sergei Likhachev, then to Teimuraz Kakulia and finally to Andrej Potanin. He was finally inducted in 2014.

== Death ==
Korotkov died on 14 June 2025, at the age of 77.

== External sources ==
- Vladimir Korotkov at the Association of Tennis Professionals
- Vladimir Korotkov at the International Tennis Federation
- Vladimir Korotkov at the Davis Cup (archived)
- Korotkov Vladimir Viktorovich at the Russian Tennis Encyclopedia (in Russian)
