= Patricia Montaño =

Mexican tennis player

- Country (sports): Mexico
- Born: 7 August 1952 (age 72)

Singles

Grand Slam singles results
- French Open: 1R (1967, 1968)

Doubles

Grand Slam doubles results
- French Open: 2R (1968)
Medal record
Central American and Caribbean Games
Gold medal – first place	1966 San Juan	Women's doubles
Silver medal – second place	1966 San Juan	Women's singles

Patricia Montaño (born 7 August 1952) is a Mexican former professional tennis player.

Montaño, the 1968 Orange Bowl champion, is the sister of tennis players Emilio and Olga. In both 1968 and 1969 she was a member of the Mexico Federation Cup team and made both of her two appearances in ties against Italy. She competed in the main draw at two editions of the French Open and represented Mexico at the Central American and Caribbean Games, Pan American Games and Summer Olympics during her career.

A doubles gold medalist at the 1966 Central American and Caribbean Games, Montaño lost a bronze medal play-off in doubles at the 1967 Pan American Games, where she also reached the singles quarterfinals. When Mexico City hosted the 1968 Olympics, tennis was included as an unofficial event, with Montaño selected in the Mexican team. Her best performance was the semifinals in the demonstration women's doubles.
