= Pierre Darmon =

French tennis player

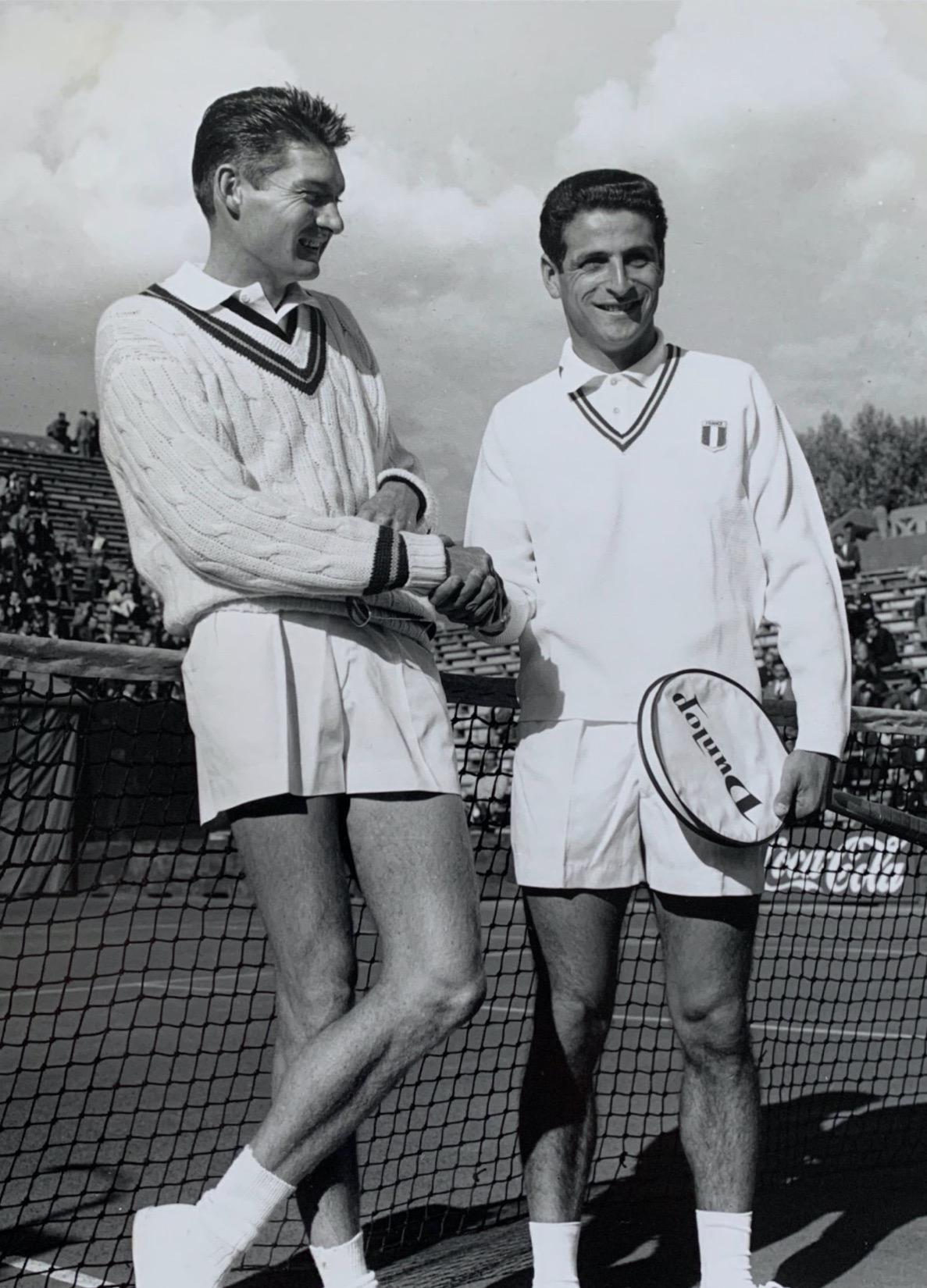
- Darmon (right)
- Country (sports): France
- Born: 14 January 1934 (age 92) Tunis, Tunisia
- Turned pro: 1950 (amateur tour)
- Retired: 1968
- Plays: Right-handed (one-handed backhand)

Singles
- Career titles: 92
- Highest ranking: No. 8 (1963, World's Top 10)

Grand Slam singles results
- Australian Open: QF (1965)
- French Open: F (1963)
- Wimbledon: 4R (1958, 1960, 1962, 1966)
- US Open: 4R (1963)

Grand Slam doubles results
- Wimbledon: F (1963)

Other doubles tournaments
- Olympic Games: SF – 3rd (1968, demonstration)

Pierre Darmon (born 14 January 1934) is a French former tennis player. He was ranked No.8 in the world in 1963, and also reached the top ten in 1958 and 1964.

== Early life ==
Darmon was born in Tunis, Tunisia. He moved to France at 17 years of age.

== Tennis career ==
Darmon was French national junior champion in 1950. He was France's top-ranked tennis player from 1957 to 1969, and won the national title nine times in that period. He also won the French national doubles championship in 1957 (with Paul Rémy), 1958 (with Robert Haillet), 1961 (with Gérard Pilet), and 1966 (with François Jauffret).

In 1963, Darmon was the runner-up in singles at the French Open, where he beat Manuel Santana in five sets in the semi-finals before losing to Roy Emerson in the final in four sets. Also in 1963, he reached the finals at Wimbledon in doubles, along with partner Jean Claude Barclay. In 1965 he won the Quebec International Round Robin tournament. In 1966 he won the Le Touquet International Challenge Cup against Fred Stolle.

He was international veterans mixed doubles champion with his wife Rosie Darmon in 1961, and in 1968 and 1975 with Gail Chanfreau.

=== Davis Cup ===
Darmon was a member of France's Davis Cup Team from 1956 to 1967, winning 44 of the 68 matches in which he participated. Darmon holds France's record for the most wins and most singles victories. He played in 34 Davis Cup ties for France, second only to compatriot François Jauffret who played one more. He holds the record for most singles victories by a French Davis Cup player, having had a record of 44-17.

== Honors ==
In 1997, he was inducted into the International Jewish Sports Hall of Fame. In 2002, he received the Davis Cup Award of Excellence. In 2019, the International Tennis Hall of Fame and the International Tennis Federation presented Darmon with The Golden Achievement Award.

== Grand Slam finals ==
=== Singles (1 runner-up) ===
Result	Year	Championship	Surface	Opponent	Score
Loss	1963	French Championships	Clay	(Australia) Roy Emerson	6–3, 1–6, 4–6, 4–6

=== Doubles (1 runner-up) ===
Result	Year	Championship	Surface	Partner	Opponents	Score
Loss	1963	Wimbledon	Grass	(France) Jean-Claude Barclay	(Mexico) Antonio Palafox (Mexico) Rafael Osuna	6–4, 2–6, 2–6, 2–6

== See also ==
- List of select Jewish tennis players
