= Pancho Guzmán =

Ecuadorian tennis player (born 1946)

- Full name: J. Francisco Guzmán Carmigniani
- Country (sports): Ecuador
- Born: 24 May 1946 (age 79) Guayaquil, Ecuador

Singles
- Career record: 162-151
- Career titles: 3

Grand Slam singles results
- French Open: 3R (1965, 1966)
- Wimbledon: 2R (1968)
- US Open: 2R (1965, 1968, 1970)

Doubles
- Career record: 7–8
- Career titles: 0

Grand Slam doubles results
- French Open: 2R (1970)
- US Open: 2R (1969)

Mixed doubles

Grand Slam mixed doubles results
- French Open: SF (1966)

J. Francisco Guzmán Carmigniani (born 24 May 1946), known as Pancho Guzmán, is an Ecuadorian former tennis player active in the 1960s and 1970s.

== Biography ==
Guzmán, the son of a banker, began playing tennis at the age of seven and trained at the Guayaquil Tennis Club. He was 11 when he won his first national title and in 1961 was a finalist in the Orange Bowl. In 1963 he made his Davis Cup debut for Ecuador, for a tie against Trinidad and Tobago, aged only 17.

In the 1965 French Championships, Guzmán was in the unusual situation of exiting in the third round, without even playing a match. He received a first round bye, then benefited from a walkover in the second round when number one seed Manuel Santana had to withdraw. In the third round he lost in a walkover to Bill Hoogs. He made the third round again at the 1966 French Championships, but this time featured in the tournament, with wins over Mike Belkin and Terry Ryan. In the mixed doubles he partnered with Helen Gourlay to make the semi-finals. He is listed as losing in a walkover for the first round of the singles in every French Open from 1967 to 1971.

In April 1969, Guzman won the Jacksonville Invitation defeating Nicholas Kalogeropoulos in the semifinal and Mike Belkin in the final.

His most famous moment came in the 1967 Davis Cup when he defeated Arthur Ashe in the reverse singles to complete a surprise victory for Ecuador over the United States in the Americas Inter-Zonal Final. The tie was played on Guzmán's home court in Guayaquil. He began started with a loss to Cliff Richey in the first match of the tie, before Miguel Olvera levelled it at 1–1 going into the doubles. Guzmán then teamed up with Olvera to win the doubles rubber, 8–6 in the fifth set. Guzmán secured the tie in the first of the reverse singles in a match against Ashe which went the distance. He lost two of the sets 0–6, including the first, but was able to prevail in five. Ecuador widely celebrated the win across the country and the El Universo newspaper used a headline that translates to "A victory for history" to describe to triumph. This qualified Ecuador for Inter-Zonal semi final against Spain in Barcelona and where they were no match for the European team who eliminated them from the tournament.

He came from two sets down to beat Bob Lutz in a 64-game marathon opening round match at the 1968 Wimbledon Championships. Also in 1968, he competed in the exhibition tournament for tennis at the 1968 Summer Olympics and won a bronze medal in men's doubles with Teimuraz Kakulia.

At the 1969 Canadian Open he made it as far as the quarter-finals of the singles, where he was two points away from upsetting top seed John Newcombe in the fifth set, as well as making the semi-finals in the doubles, with Dick Crealy.

In 1974, he made his last Davis Cup appearance for Ecuador. He featured with a total of 14 ties and finished his representative career with 13 wins from 37 matches.

== See also ==
- List of Ecuador Davis Cup team representatives
