= María Eugenia Guzmán =

Ecuadorian tennis player

- Country (sports): Ecuador
- Born: 8 September 1945
- Died: 1996 (aged 50–51)

Singles

Grand Slam singles results
- French Open: 3R (1969)
- Wimbledon: 3R (1970)
- US Open: 2R (1964, 1967)

Doubles

Grand Slam doubles results
- Wimbledon: 2R (1969, 1971, 1972)
- US Open: 3R (1967)

María Eugenia Guzmán (8 September 1945 – March 1996) was an Ecuadorian former professional tennis player.

== Tennis career ==
Guzmán won two medals for Ecuador at the 1967 Pan American Games held in Winnipeg. She was a silver medalist in the women's doubles with Ana María Ycaza and got a bronze in the mixed doubles partnering Pancho Guzmán.

At the 1968 Summer Olympics in Mexico City, Guzmán took part in the demonstration and exhibition tennis tournaments, for third place finishes in both the women's singles and doubles exhibitions.

Guzmán's best performances in grand slam tournaments were third round appearances at the 1969 French Open and 1970 Wimbledon Championships.

In 1972, towards the end of Guzmán's career, Ecuador entered the Federation Cup for the first time and she featured in all four ties. It was the only occasion that Ecuador have reached the second round of the World Group.
