= Herb Fitzgibbon =

American tennis player

- Country (sports): United States
- Born: July 14, 1942 (age 83); Garden City, New York, U.S.
- Plays: Right-handed

Singles
- Career record: 245-119
- Career titles: 21

Grand Slam singles results
- Australian Open: 3R (1966)
- French Open: 4R (1968)
- Wimbledon: 3R (1965)
- US Open: 3R (1962, 1964, 1965, 1967, 1971)

Other tournaments
- Olympic Games: SF – 3rd (1968, demonstration)

Doubles

Grand Slam doubles results
- Australian Open: QF (1966)
- Wimbledon: 2R (1965, 1973)

Grand Slam mixed doubles results
- Australian Open: 1R (1966)

Other mixed doubles tournaments
- Olympic Games: W (1968, demonstration)

Herbert Fitzgibbon (born July 14, 1942) is a former tennis player who was nationally ranked in the 1960s and 1970s.

Fitzgibbon played four years of high school tennis for Garden City High School and never lost a match. He played collegiate tennis at Princeton University and was a gold and bronze medalist at the Olympic Games in Mexico City in 1968 when tennis was a demonstration sport.

Fitzgibbon won the singles title at the tournament at the Cincinnati Open in 1964 and was a two-time singles runner-up (1965 and 1963) there as well. He also reached the Cincinnati doubles final with Butch Newman in 1965. In 1964, he won the Eastern Clay Court Championships title. In 1964, 1965, and 1966 he won the Long Island Championships. Fitzgibbon won the Eastern Indoor Championships in 1965, 1970, and 1971. In 1968, Fitzgibbon won against 16th-seeded Nikola Pilić in the first round at Wimbledon. The same year he won the La Coruna International in Spain against Juan Gisbert Sr.

Fitzgibbon also was an accomplished platform tennis player, winning national doubles titles in 1974 with John Beck and in 1977 and 1978 with Hank Irvine. In 1974, Fitzgibbon and Beck defeated Keith Jennings and Chauncey Steele III. In 1977, Fitzgibbon and Irvine defeated Gordon Gray and Doug Russell. Fitzgibbon and Irvine also played in the 1980 National Championship final losing to Steve Baird and Rich Maier.

Fitzgibbon wrote the book The Complete Racquet Sports Player.
