= Ingo Buding =

German tennis player

- Full name: Ingo Dietmar Buding
- Country (sports): West Germany
- Born: 9 January 1942; Lovrin, Kingdom of Romania
- Died: 10 May 2003 (aged 61); Bandol, France
- Turned pro: 1959 (amateur tour)
- Retired: 1970
- Plays: Right-handed (one-handed backhand)

Singles
- Career record: 38–48

Grand Slam singles results
- Australian Open: 2R (1962)
- French Open: QF (1965)
- Wimbledon: 3R (1965)
- US Open: 2R (1966, 1968)

Other tournaments
- Olympic Games: 2R (1968, demonstration event)

Doubles
- Career record: 13–19

Grand Slam doubles results
- Australian Open: 2R (1962)
- French Open: QF (1968)
- Wimbledon: 2R (1961, 1963, 1967, 1970)

Mixed doubles

Grand Slam mixed doubles results
- Australian Open: QF (1962)
- Wimbledon: 4R (1965)

Ingo Dietmar Buding (9 January 1942 – 10 May 2003) was a West German tennis player. His sisters Edda and Ilse were also tennis players.

Buding reached the quarterfinals of Roland Garros in 1965 and won the boys' singles title in 1959 and 1960. At the 1968 Olympics exhibition event, he finished in second place to Rafael Osuna, and reached the second round of the main demonstration event.
