= Teimuraz Kakulia =

Soviet tennis player

- Full name: Teimuraz Irakleivich Kakuliya
- Country (sports): Soviet Union
- Born: 26 April 1947 Tbilisi, Georgian SSR
- Died: 25 August 2006 (aged 59) Tbilisi, Georgia
- Height: 1.70 m (5 ft 7 in)
- Turned pro: 1966
- Retired: 1978
- Plays: Right-handed

Singles
- Career record: 31–36
- Career titles: 0
- Highest ranking: No. 91 (April 8, 1975)

Grand Slam singles results
- Australian Open: 3R (1973)
- French Open: 2R (1970, 1971, 1974)
- Wimbledon: 3R (1972, 1976)
- US Open: 4R (1976)

Doubles
- Career record: 12–29
- Career titles: 0

Grand Slam doubles results
- Australian Open: SF (1973)
- French Open: 2R (1970, 1971, 1972, 1974, 1975)
- Wimbledon: 2R (1974)
- US Open: 2R (1974, 1976)

Mixed doubles

Grand Slam mixed doubles results
- Wimbledon: 2R (1972, 1973, 1974, 1975)
Medal record
Representing Soviet Union
Summer Universiade
Gold medal – first place	1973 Moscow	Singles
Gold medal – first place	1973 Moscow	Doubles
Gold medal – first place	1973 Moscow	Mixed Doubles

Teimuraz Irakleivich Kakuliya (Georgian: თეიმურაზ კაკულია, romanized: teimuraz k'ak'ulia, pronounced [tʰeimuɾaz kʼakʼulia]; 26 April 1947, Tbilisi, Georgian SSR — 25 August 2006, Tbilisi, Georgia) was a Soviet tennis player and Soviet/Georgian tennis coach.

== Tennis career ==
Teimuraz Kakulia started playing tennis at the age of 11. For the most part of his tennis career, he remained in the shadow of his colleague and friend Alex Metreveli, losing to him five times in the singles finals of the USSR tennis championships. Together they took five men's doubles titles at the Soviet championships, and Kakulia won the tournament once with Marina Chuvyrina in mixed doubles.

Other highlights of Kakulia's career were winning bronze medals in the mixed doubles exhibition event at the 1968 Olympic Games at the age of 21; winning the tennis tournament at the 1973 Summer Universiade in singles, men's doubles and mixed doubles; and reaching 1972 Australian Open semifinals in men's doubles (with Metreveli). In singles, his best achievements were reaching the fourth round at the 1976 US Open as well as victories over Eddie Dibbs and Mark Edmondson. He also won the Wimbledon Plate.

In addition, Kakulia has played an integral part in the Soviet Davis Cup team victories at the Europe Zone in 1974 and 1976 after which the team advanced to the Inter-Zonal stage. As a team member, Kakulia was also a four-time European amateur champion.

In 1977, Teimuraz Kakulia was awarded the Distinguished Master of Sport of the USSR rank, the highest in the Soviet sports classification. He was only the second Soviet tennis player to join WCT, with Metreveli's being the first.

After finishing his active playing career, Kakulia focused on coaching. He was a member of the Soviet national team coaching group. Leila Meskhi, bronze medalist at the 1992 Olympics, was the most successful among his trainees. During the last 10 years of his life, illness prevented from coaching.

== Grand Slam singles performance timeline ==
Key
W	F	SF	QF	#R	RR	Q#	DNQ	A	NH

(W) winner; (F) finalist; (SF) semifinalist; (QF) quarterfinalist; (#R) rounds 4, 3, 2, 1; (RR) round-robin stage; (Q#) qualification round; (DNQ) did not qualify; (A) absent; (NH) not held; (SR) strike rate (events won / competed); (W–L) win–loss record.

Tournament	1967	1968	1969	1970	1971	1972	1973	1974	1975	1976
Australian Open	A	A	A	A	A	A	3R	A	A	2R
French Open	A	A	A	2R	2R	1R (Note: The 1972 French Open had two preliminary rounds. After qualifying, Kakulia won in both to enter the main draw. These wins do not count as main draw wins.)	1R	2R	1R	A
Wimbledon	Q2	A	A	A	A	3R	1R	2R	1R	3R
US Open	A	A	A	A	A	1R	A	2R	A	4R
