= Joaquín Loyo-Mayo =

Mexican tennis player (1945–2014)

- Country (sports): Mexico
- Born: August 16, 1945 Veracruz, Mexico
- Died: December 27, 2014 (aged 69) Córdoba, Veracruz, Mexico
- Turned pro: 1969 (amateur from 1961)
- Retired: 1982
- Plays: Left-handed

Singles
- Highest ranking: No. 99 (April 5, 1976)

Grand Slam singles results
- Australian Open: 2R (1975)
- French Open: 3R (1970)
- Wimbledon: 4R (1971)
- US Open: 3R (1965, 1968, 1969)

Doubles
- Career record: 36–86
- Highest ranking: No. 91 (March 1, 1976)

Joaquín Loyo-Mayo (August 16, 1945 – December 27, 2014) was a Mexican tennis player active from 1961 to 1982.

== Career ==
Born in Veracruz, Mexico, he played his first tournament at the Washington State Championships in the United States in 1961. he won his first singles title in 1963 at the San Luis Potosi International, he would go on to win that tournament a further five times which remains a tournament record. In November 1963, he represented his homeland in the inaugural Games of the New Emerging Forces (GANEFO) in Jakarta. Partnering M.L. de Santiago, he won a silver medal in the men's doubles.

He won the singles title at Tri-State Championships in Cincinnati in 1967, defeating Jaime Fillol in the final, and was a doubles finalist in Cincinnati in 1975 and 1968.

He reached the Round of 16 at Wimbledon in 1971, and the third round at the French Open and Wimbledon in 1970. he won his final tournament at the San Luis Potosí Open in 1974. He played his final tournament in 1982 at the Mexican Satellite tournament.

His other career singles highlights include winning the Tennessee Valley Invitational two times (1966, 1969), the Olaj Championships (1968), the Blue Gray Invitation (1968), the Mexican Championships four times consecutively (1968–1971), the U.S. Intercollegiate Championships (1969), the March of Dimes Tennis Tournament (1968), the U.S. Intercollegiate Championships (1969), and the El Tapatio International (1973).

He also represented Mexico in the Davis Cup, playing in 45 matches from 1964 to 1976.

Loyo-Mayo's playing career was coming to an end as the ATP rankings were coming into being. He achieved a ranking of world no. 99 in the rankings on April 12, 1976.

In the late 1960s, he earned a degree in marketing at the University of Southern California. In 1989, he joined, as professional coach, Edgbaston Archery & Lawn Tennis Society in Birmingham, United Kingdom, the oldest lawn tennis club in the world.

== Open Era career finals ==
=== Singles (2 runner-ups) ===
Result	W–L	Date	Tournament	Surface	Opponent	Score
Loss	0–1	Jan 1969	Omaha, US		(United States) Cliff Richey	4–6, 2–6
Loss	0–2	Apr 1970	St. Petersburg, US	Clay	(Czechoslovakia) Jan Kodeš	3–6, 3–6, 3–6

=== Doubles (1 title / 3 runner-ups) ===
Result	W–L	Date	Tournament	Surface	Partner	Opponents	Score
Loss	0–1	Jul 1968	Cincinnati, US	Clay	(Chile) Jaime Fillol	(United States) William Brown (United States) Ron Goldman	8–10, 3–6
Loss	0–2	Jun 1973	Berlin, Germany	Clay	(Mexico) Raúl Ramírez	(West Germany) Jürgen Fassbender (West Germany) Hans-Jürgen Pohmann	8–10, 3–6
Loss	0–3	Aug 1973	Cincinnati, US	Hard	(Mexico) Marcelo Lara	(Australia) Phil Dent (South Africa) Cliff Drysdale	6–7, 4–6
Win	1–3	May 1975	Nice, France	Clay	(Mexico) Marcelo Lara	(Colombia) Iván Molina (Colombia) Jairo Velasco Sr.	7–6, 6–7, 8–6
