= 1974 Torneo Godó – Singles =

Singles
- 1974 Torneo Godó

Final
- Champion: (Romania) Ilie Năstase
- Runner-up: (Spain) Manuel Orantes
- Score: 8–6, 9–7, 6–3

Details
- Draw: 64
- Seeds: 8

Events
Singles	Doubles
← 1973 ·	Barcelona Open	· 1975 →

The 1974 Torneo Godó – Singles was an event of the 1974 Torneo Godó tennis tournament and was played on outdoor clay courts at the Real Club de Tenis Barcelona in Barcelona, Spain between 14 October and 20 October 1974. The draw comprised 64 players and eight of them were seeded. Fourth-seeded Ilie Năstase was the defending Torneo Godó singles champion and retained the title by defeating third-seeded Manuel Orantes in the final, 8–6, 9–7, 6–3.

== Seeds ==
1. (Argentina) Guillermo Vilas (third round)
2. (Sweden) Björn Borg (semifinals)
3. (Spain) Manuel Orantes (final)
4. (Romania) Ilie Năstase (champion)
5. (United States) Harold Solomon (quarterfinals)
6. (Netherlands) Tom Okker (third round)
7. (Czechoslovakia) Jan Kodeš (quarterfinals)
8. (United States) Arthur Ashe (second round)

Click on the seed number of a player to go to their draw section.

== Draw ==
=== Key ===
- Q = Qualifier
- WC = Wild card
- LL = Lucky loser
- Alt = Alternate
- SE = Special exempt
- PR = Protected ranking
- ITF = ITF entry
- JE = Junior exempt
- w/o = Walkover
- r = Retired
- d = Defaulted
- SR = Special ranking

=== Finals ===
Quarterfinals
2	(Sweden) Björn Borg	0	9	7
7	(Czechoslovakia) Jan Kodeš	6	7	5
3	(Spain) Manuel Orantes	6	7
(Chile) Jaime Fillol	1	5
5	(United States) Harold Solomon	1	6	1
4	(Romania) Ilie Năstase	6	0	6
Q	(Poland) Wojciech Fibak	1	2
(France) François Jauffret	6	6

Semifinals
2	(Sweden) Björn Borg	1	5	2
3	(Spain) Manuel Orantes	6	7	6
4	(Romania) Ilie Năstase	6	6	6
(France) François Jauffret	3	0	2

Final
3	(Spain) Manuel Orantes	6	7	3
4	(Romania) Ilie Năstase	8	9	6

=== Top half ===
==== Section 1 ====
First Round
2	(Sweden) Björn Borg	6	8
Q	(Chile) Alejandro Pierola	2	6
(South Africa) Frew McMillan	3	0
(Australia) Barry Phillips-Moore	6	6
(United States) Brian Gottfried	6	6	6
(United Kingdom) Mark Farrell	8	4	4
(Austria) Hans Kary	6	6
(United Kingdom) Graham Stilwell	4	4
7	(Czechoslovakia) Jan Kodeš	6	7
(Serbia) Nikola Špear	2	5
(Brazil) Thomaz Koch	6	6
(Spain) Juan Ignacio Muntañola	1	1
(Mexico) Raúl Ramírez	6	6
Q	(Spain) Rafael Ruiz	1	2
(Argentina) Tito Vázquez	4	0
(South Africa) John Yuill	6	6

Second Round
2	(Sweden) Björn Borg	6	6
(Australia) Barry Phillips-Moore	4	0
(United States) Brian Gottfried	6	5	4
(Austria) Hans Kary	3	7	6
7	(Czechoslovakia) Jan Kodeš	6	6
(Brazil) Thomaz Koch	4	3
(Mexico) Raúl Ramírez	6	6
(South Africa) John Yuill	1	4

Third Round
2	(Sweden) Björn Borg	9	6
(Austria) Hans Kary	7	4
7	(Czechoslovakia) Jan Kodeš	6	1	7
(Mexico) Raúl Ramírez	2	6	5

Quarterfinals
2	(Sweden) Björn Borg	0	9	7
7	(Czechoslovakia) Jan Kodeš	6	7	5

==== Section 2 ====
First Round
3	(Spain) Manuel Orantes	6	7
Q	(West Germany) Frank Gebert	1	5
(Spain) Jose A. Moreno	4	8	6
(Colombia) Jairo Velasco Sr.	6	6	2
(Chile) Patricio Cornejo	15	6	3
Q	(United States) Vitas Gerulaitis	17	2	6
(United Kingdom) John Lloyd	6	6
(India) Anand Amritraj	4	0
(Chile) Jaime Fillol	5	6	6
Q	(United States) Norman Holmes	7	1	4
(Romania) Ion Țiriac	3	4
(France) Patrice Dominguez	6	6
6	(Netherlands) Tom Okker	6	6
(Czechoslovakia) František Pála	2	3
(United States) Steve Krulevitz	5	3
(Sweden) Kjell Johansson	7	6

Second Round
3	(Spain) Manuel Orantes	6	6
(Spain) Jose A. Moreno	1	1
Q	(United States) Vitas Gerulaitis	3	7	7
(United Kingdom) John Lloyd	6	5	5
(Chile) Jaime Fillol	6	4	6
(France) Patrice Dominguez	3	6	3
6	(Netherlands) Tom Okker	7	6
(Sweden) Kjell Johansson	5	3

Third Round
3	(Spain) Manuel Orantes	6	6
Q	(United States) Vitas Gerulaitis	2	2
(Chile) Jaime Fillol	6	6
6	(Netherlands) Tom Okker	1	3

Quarterfinals
3	(Spain) Manuel Orantes	6	7
(Chile) Jaime Fillol	1	5

=== Bottom half ===
==== Section 3 ====
First Round
(Zimbabwe) Andrew Pattison	6	6
Q	(Mexico) Joaquín Loyo-Mayo	1	3
(Czechoslovakia) Milan Holeček	2	0
(United States) Eddie Dibbs	6	6
(United Kingdom) Gerald Battrick	2	2
(United Kingdom) Buster Mottram	6	6
(Colombia) Iván Molina	3	6
5	(United States) Harold Solomon	6	8
(Socialist Federal Republic of Yugoslavia) Željko Franulović	6	6
(Spain) Jose Guerrero	3	4
Q	(West Germany) Ulrich Pinner	7	6
(India) Vijay Amritraj	5	0
(United Kingdom) Roger Taylor	6	6
(Spain) José Castañón	2	3
(Pakistan) Haroon Rahim	2	4
4	(Romania) Ilie Năstase	6	6

Second Round
(Zimbabwe) Andrew Pattison	2	5
(United States) Eddie Dibbs	6	7
(United Kingdom) Buster Mottram	2	5
5	(United States) Harold Solomon	6	7
(Socialist Federal Republic of Yugoslavia) Željko Franulović	6	4	8
Q	(West Germany) Ulrich Pinner	1	6	10
(United Kingdom) Roger Taylor	1	11	4
4	(Romania) Ilie Năstase	6	9	6

Third Round
(United States) Eddie Dibbs	6	4	6
5	(United States) Harold Solomon	3	6	8
Q	(West Germany) Ulrich Pinner	1	2
4	(Romania) Ilie Năstase	6	6

Quarterfinals
5	(United States) Harold Solomon	1	6	1
4	(Romania) Ilie Năstase	6	0	6

==== Section 4 ====
First Round
(Brazil) José Edison Mandarino	4	5
Q	(Poland) Wojciech Fibak	6	7
(Spain) Antonio Muñoz	4	4
8	(United States) Arthur Ashe	6	6
(West Germany) Harald Elschenbroich	5	4
(Spain) Juan Herrera	7	6
(Argentina) Julián Ganzábal	2	7
(Spain) Juan Gisbert Sr.	6	9
(United States) Rick Fisher	1	3
(Rhodesia) Roger Dowdeswell	6	6
(Czechoslovakia) Jiří Hřebec	3	1
(France) François Jauffret	6	6
(South Africa) Ray Moore	6	6
(Australia) Ray Keldie	3	3
(France) Patrick Proisy	2	0
1	(Argentina) Guillermo Vilas	6	6

Second Round
Q	(Poland) Wojciech Fibak	6	7	6
8	(United States) Arthur Ashe	4	9	3
(Spain) Juan Herrera	0	3
(Spain) Juan Gisbert Sr.	6	6
(Rhodesia) Roger Dowdeswell	2	3
(France) François Jauffret	6	6
(South Africa) Ray Moore	1	1
1	(Argentina) Guillermo Vilas	6	6

Third Round
Q	(Poland) Wojciech Fibak	2	7	6
(Spain) Juan Gisbert Sr.	6	5	4
(France) François Jauffret	7	6
1	(Argentina) Guillermo Vilas	5	4

Quarterfinals
Q	(Poland) Wojciech Fibak	1	2
(France) François Jauffret	6	6
