= 1974 Torneo Godó – Doubles =

Doubles
- 1974 Torneo Godó

Final
- Champion: (Spain) Juan Gisbert (Romania) Ilie Năstase
- Runner-up: (Spain) Manuel Orantes
- Score: 3–6, 6–0, 6–2

Details
- Draw: 32
- Seeds: 8

Events
Singles	Doubles
← 1973 ·	Barcelona Open	· 1975 →

The 1974 Torneo Godó – Doubles was an event of the 1974 Torneo Godó tennis tournament and was played on outdoor clay courts at the Real Club de Tenis Barcelona in Barcelona, Spain between 14 October and 20 October 1974. The draw consisted of 32 teams and eight of them were seeded. Fourth-seeded Ilie Năstase and Tom Okker were the defending Torneo Godó doubles champions but did not compete together in this edition. The second-seeded team of Juan Gisbert and Ilie Năstase won the title by defeating the fourth-seeded team of Manuel Orantes and in the final, 3–6, 6–0, 6–2.

== Seeds ==
1. (United States) Brian Gottfried / (Mexico) Raúl Ramírez (semifinals)
2. (Spain) Juan Gisbert Sr. / (Romania) Ilie Năstase (champions)
3. (Chile) Patricio Cornejo / (Chile) Jaime Fillol (quarterfinals)
4. (Spain) Manuel Orantes / (Argentina) Guillermo Vilas (final)
5. (Czechoslovakia) Jiří Hřebec / (Czechoslovakia) Jan Kodeš (semifinals)
6. (United States) Arthur Ashe / (Netherlands) Tom Okker (first round)
7. (India) Anand Amritraj / (India) Vijay Amritraj (second round)
8. (France) Patrice Dominguez / (France) François Jauffret (second round)

== Draw ==
=== Key ===
- Q = Qualifier
- WC = Wild card
- LL = Lucky loser
- Alt = Alternate
- SE = Special exempt
- PR = Protected ranking
- ITF = ITF entry
- JE = Junior exempt
- w/o = Walkover
- r = Retired
- d = Defaulted
- SR = Special ranking

=== Finals ===
Semifinals
2	(Spain) Juan Gisbert Sr. (Romania) Ilie Năstase	8	6
5	(Czechoslovakia) Jiří Hřebec (Czechoslovakia) Jan Kodeš	6	1
4	(Spain) Manuel Orantes (Argentina) Guillermo Vilas	6	6	13
1	(United States) Brian Gottfried (Mexico) Raúl Ramírez	3	8	11

Final
2	(Spain) Juan Gisbert Sr. (Romania) Ilie Năstase	3	6	6
4	(Spain) Manuel Orantes (Argentina) Guillermo Vilas	6	0	2

=== Top half ===
First Round
2	(Spain) Juan Gisbert Sr. (Romania) Ilie Năstase	6	11
(Colombia) Iván Molina (Colombia) Jairo Velasco Sr.	1	9
(Spain) Jose A. Moreno (Spain) Juan Ignacio Muntañola	4	3
(South Africa) Raymond Moore (Zimbabwe) Andrew Pattison	6	6
7	(India) Anand Amritraj (India) Vijay Amritraj	6	6
(United Kingdom) Gerald Battrick (United Kingdom) Graham Stilwell	2	1
(Spain) José Castañón (Spain) Ángel Giménez	1	3
(United Kingdom) Colin Dowdeswell (South Africa) Frew McMillan	6	6
3	(Chile) Patricio Cornejo (Chile) Jaime Fillol	6	9
(Serbia) Nikola Špear (South Africa) John Yuill	2	7
(Brazil) José Edison Mandarino (Spain) Antonio Muñoz	8	7
(United Kingdom) Mark Farrell (United Kingdom) John Lloyd	6	5
5	(Czechoslovakia) Jiří Hřebec (Czechoslovakia) Jan Kodeš	6	6
(Australia) Barry Phillips-Moore (Pakistan) Haroon Rahim	3	3
(United States) Eddie Dibbs (United States) Harold Solomon	3	10	3
(Mexico) Joaquín Loyo-Mayo (Chile) Patricio Rodríguez	6	8	6

Second Round
2	(Spain) Juan Gisbert Sr. (Romania) Ilie Năstase	6	6
(South Africa) Raymond Moore (Zimbabwe) Andrew Pattison	1	2
7	(India) Anand Amritraj (India) Vijay Amritraj	6	7	3
(United Kingdom) Colin Dowdeswell (South Africa) Frew McMillan	3	9	6
3	(Chile) Patricio Cornejo (Chile) Jaime Fillol	7	6
(Brazil) José Edison Mandarino (Spain) Antonio Muñoz	5	2
5	(Czechoslovakia) Jiří Hřebec (Czechoslovakia) Jan Kodeš	6	6
(Mexico) Joaquín Loyo-Mayo (Chile) Patricio Rodríguez	4	2

Quarterfinals
2	(Spain) Juan Gisbert Sr. (Romania) Ilie Năstase	6	6
(United Kingdom) Colin Dowdeswell (South Africa) Frew McMillan	2	2
3	(Chile) Patricio Cornejo (Chile) Jaime Fillol	5	6	3
5	(Czechoslovakia) Jiří Hřebec (Czechoslovakia) Jan Kodeš	7	2	6

Semifinals
2	(Spain) Juan Gisbert Sr. (Romania) Ilie Năstase	8	6
5	(Czechoslovakia) Jiří Hřebec (Czechoslovakia) Jan Kodeš	6	1

=== Bottom half ===
First Round
(Brazil) Thomaz Koch (Brazil) Luis Felipe Tavares	6	3
(Poland) Wojciech Fibak (Czechoslovakia) František Pála	8	6
(United Kingdom) Buster Mottram (United Kingdom) Roger Taylor	12	7
6	(United States) Arthur Ashe (Netherlands) Tom Okker	10	5
(West Germany) Harald Elschenbroich (West Germany) Ulrich Pinner	4	6	4
(Argentina) Lito Álvarez (Argentina) Julián Ganzábal	6	2	6
(Czechoslovakia) Milan Holeček (Austria) Hans Kary	2	6	1
4	(Spain) Manuel Orantes (Argentina) Guillermo Vilas	6	1	6
(Sweden) Björn Borg (Romania) Ion Țiriac	6	6
(Australia) Ray Keldie (Argentina) Tito Vázquez	4	2
(United States) Rick Fisher (United States) Steve Krulevitz	3	1
8	(France) Patrice Dominguez (France) François Jauffret	6	6
(West Germany) Frank Gebert (Greece) Nicolas Kelaidis	6	7	8
(Socialist Federal Republic of Yugoslavia) Željko Franulović (United States) Vitas Gerulaitis	8	5	10
(Chile) Alejandro Pierola (Spain) Rafael Ruiz	2	3
1	(United States) Brian Gottfried (Mexico) Raúl Ramírez	6	6

Second Round
(Poland) Wojciech Fibak (Czechoslovakia) František Pála	6	4
(United Kingdom) Buster Mottram (United Kingdom) Roger Taylor	8	6
(Argentina) Lito Álvarez (Argentina) Julián Ganzábal	2	0
4	(Spain) Manuel Orantes (Argentina) Guillermo Vilas	6	6
(Sweden) Björn Borg (Romania) Ion Țiriac	6	2	6
8	(France) Patrice Dominguez (France) François Jauffret	3	6	3
(Socialist Federal Republic of Yugoslavia) Željko Franulović (United States) Vitas Gerulaitis	4	4
1	(United States) Brian Gottfried (Mexico) Raúl Ramírez	6	6

Quarterfinals
(United Kingdom) Buster Mottram (United Kingdom) Roger Taylor	2	0
4	(Spain) Manuel Orantes (Argentina) Guillermo Vilas	6	6
(Sweden) Björn Borg (Romania) Ion Țiriac	5	1
1	(United States) Brian Gottfried (Mexico) Raúl Ramírez	7	6

Semifinals
4	(Spain) Manuel Orantes (Argentina) Guillermo Vilas	6	6	13
1	(United States) Brian Gottfried (Mexico) Raúl Ramírez	3	8	11
