= Cairo Championships =

Cairo Championships Championships of Cairo

Defunct tennis tournament
- Founded: 1932; 93 years ago
- Abolished: 1978; 47 years ago
- Location: Cairo, Egypt
- Venue: Tawfikiya Tennis Club; Gezira Sporting Club
- Surface: Clay

The Cairo Championships or Championships of Cairo was a men's and women's international clay court tennis tournament founded circa 1932. It was played in Cairo, Egypt. The tournament ran until 1978 with breaks.

== History ==
The Cairo Championships or sometimes called Championships of Cairo was a men's and women's international clay court tennis tournament founded circa 1932. The championships were first played at the Gezira Sporting Club, Cairo, Egypt. In the 1950s the tournament was held at Tawfikiya Tennis Club (f. 1896), Cairo, before returning to the Gezira Sporting Club. The tournament was staged until the early 1970s.

For the years 1937, 1939, 1960 1968 1969 it was co-valid as Egyptian International Championships, In 1972, 1976, 1977, 1978 this tournament was co-valid as the Egyptian Open.

== Finals ==
=== Men's singles ===
Note two editions of the mens event was held in 1968, one in March the other late September early October (incomplete roll)

Year	Winner	Runner-up	Score
1937	(Germany) Henner Henkel	(Italy) Giorgio de Stefani	7–5, 6–0
1939	(Germany) Gottfried von Cramm	(United States) Don McNeill	7–5, 6–2, 6–8, 6–2
1948	(Socialist Federal Republic of Yugoslavia) Franjo Punčec	(Egypt) Adly Shafei	7-5 6-4
1949	(United States) Frank Parker	(United States) Budge Patty	6-2 9-7 8-6
1954	(Egypt) Adly Shafei	(Egypt) Daniel Acobas	4-6 7-5 6-3 5-7 6-1
1955	(South Africa) Trevor Fancutt	(France) Bernard Destremau	6-2 3-6 6-4
1960	(Italy) Nicola Pietrangeli (3)	(Italy) Giuseppe Merlo	5–7, 6–2, 6–3, 6–3
1966	(Egypt) Fathi Mohammed Ali	(Egypt) Mootaz Sombol	6-3 6-2 3-6 6-4
1968	(Czechoslovakia) Milan Holeček	(Egypt) Ismail El Shafei	4–6, 6–3, 6–1, 6–2
1968	(Egypt) Ismail El Shafei	(Egypt) Abdel Ghani Mohammed	6-2 6-3 6-1
Open era
1969	(Egypt) Ismail El Shafei	(Hungary) István Gulyás	6–4, 7–9, 6–4, 6–4
1972	(Egypt) Aly El Dawoudi	(Egypt) Ibrahim Mahmoud	7-5 3-6 6-4 6-4
1975	(Spain) Manuel Orantes	(France) François Jauffret	6–0, 4–6, 6–1, 6–3
1977	(France) François Jauffret	(West Germany) Frank Gebert	6–3, 7–5, 6–4

=== Women's Singles ===
(incomplete roll)

Year	Winner	Runner-up	Score
1932	(Republic of Ireland) Lavender Letts-Campbell	(United Kingdom) Mabel Davy Clayton	0-6, 6-1, 7-5
1935	(United States) Helen Jacobs	(Austria) Liesl Herbst	6-1, 6-2
1937	(Denmark) Hilde Krahwinkel Sperling	(France) Simone Mathieu	6-2, 6-0
1939	(United Kingdom) / (Republic of Ireland) Josephine R. Harman	(United Kingdom) Rita Jarvis	6-4, 6-0.
1954	(Egypt) Betsy Abbas	(Israel) Esther Saul	4-6, 6-2, 6-3
1957	(Hungary) Suzy Kormoczi	(West Germany) Edda Buding	10-8, 1-6, 7-6
Open era
1970	(Soviet Union) Olga Morozova	(Czechoslovakia) Marcela Barochova	6-3, 6-3
1972	(France) Odile de Roubin	(Soviet Union) Marina Chuvirina	6-3, 1-6, 6-1
