= 1968 Davis Cup Europe Zone =

Men's tennis competition

The Europe Zone was one of the three regional zones of the 1968 Davis Cup.

32 teams entered the Europe Zone, competing across 2 sub-zones. The winners of each sub-zone went on to compete in the Inter-Zonal Zone against the winners of the Americas Zone and Eastern Zone.

Spain defeated Italy in the Zone A final, and West Germany defeated South Africa in the Zone B final, resulting in both Spain and West Germany progressing to the Inter-Zonal Zone.

== Zone A ==
=== Draw ===
First Round; 26 April–7 May
Valencia, Spain (clay)
Spain	3
Netherlands	2
Bandol, France (hard)
Sweden	4
Rhodesia	1
Bournemouth, England (clay)
Great Britain	3
France	0
Helsinki, Finland (clay)
Finland	4
Portugal	1
Tbilisi, Soviet Union
Soviet Union	4
Greece	1
Zagreb, Yugoslavia
Yugoslavia	4
New Zealand	0
Cagliari, Italy (clay)
Italy	5
Hungary	0
Monte Carlo, Monaco
Monaco	3
Ireland	1

Quarterfinals; 23–26 May
Barcelona, Spain (clay)
Spain	4
Sweden	1
London, England (grass)
Great Britain	5
Finland	0
Moscow, Soviet Union
Soviet Union	5
Yugoslavia	0
Biella, Italy (clay)
Italy	5
Monaco	0

Semifinals; 13–16 June
Barcelona, Spain (clay)
Spain	4
Great Britain	1
Reggio Emilia, Italy (clay)
Soviet Union	2
Italy	3

Final; 19–21 July
Barcelona, Spain (clay)
Spain	3
Italy	2

=== First round ===
==== Spain vs. Netherlands ====
Spain
3
Club de Tenis Valencia, Valencia, Spain
3–6 May 1968
Clay

Netherlands
2

			1	2	3	4	5
1	(Spain) (Netherlands)	Manuel Santana; Jan Hajer	6; 4	9; 7	6; 3
2	(Spain) (Netherlands)	Juan Gisbert; Tom Okker	5; 7	3; 6	5; 7
3	(Spain) (Netherlands)	José Luis Arilla / Manuel Santana; Jan Hajer / Tom Okker	1; 6	4; 6	6; 3	6; 4	6; 3
4	(Spain) (Netherlands)	Manuel Santana; Tom Okker	4; 6	6; 3	3; 6	7; 5	4; 6
5	(Spain) (Netherlands)	Juan Gisbert; Jan Hajer	7; 5	6; 1	6; 0

==== Sweden vs. Rhodesia ====
Sweden
4
Buding Hotel, Bandol, France
5–7 May 1968
Hard

Rhodesia
1

			1	2	3	4	5
1	(Sweden) (Rhodesia)	Ove Bengtson; Adrian Bey	6; 3	6; 2	6; 4
2	(Sweden) (Rhodesia)	Hans Nerell; Frank Saloman	6; 2	4; 6	5; 7	6; 1	5; 7
3	(Sweden) (Rhodesia)	Ove Bengtson / Hans Nerell; Adrian Bey / Frank Saloman	6; 2	6; 3	6; 0
4	(Sweden) (Rhodesia)	Ove Bengtson; Frank Saloman	6; 1	6; 3	6; 4
5	(Sweden) (Rhodesia)	Hans Nerell; Douglas Irvine	2; 6	5; 7	6; 3	6; 3	6; 3

==== Great Britain vs. France ====
Great Britain
3
West Hants Lawn Tennis Club, Bournemouth, England
2–4 May 1968
Clay

France
0

			1	2	3	4	5
1	(United Kingdom) (France)	Bobby Wilson; François Jauffret	6; 3	3; 6	1; 6	6; 4	6; 1
2	(United Kingdom) (France)	Mark Cox; Georges Goven	3; 6	4; 6	6; 1	7; 5	7; 5
3	(United Kingdom) (France)	Mark Cox / Bobby Wilson; Patrice Beust / Daniel Contet	1; 6	6; 2	3; 6	6; 4	7; 5
4	(United Kingdom) (France)	Bobby Wilson; Georges Goven	6; 1	6; 2	3; 3			not completed
5	(United Kingdom) (France)	Mark Cox; François Jauffret						not played

==== Finland vs. Portugal ====
Finland
4
Helsinki, Finland
3–5 May 1968
Clay

Portugal
1

			1	2	3	4	5
1	(Finland) (Portugal)	Pekka Petersen-Dyggve; Alfredo Vaz Pinto	3; 6	6; 2	7; 5	3; 6	6; 4
2	(Finland) (Portugal)	Tarmo Jokinen; João Lagos	5; 7	7; 5	4; 6	7; 5	6; 3
3	(Finland) (Portugal)	Heikki Hedman / Pekka Petersen-Dyggve; João Roquette / Alfredo Vaz Pinto	6; 3	6; 3	6; 3
4	(Finland) (Portugal)	Tarmo Jokinen; Alfredo Vaz Pinto	4; 6	4; 6	2; 6
5	(Finland) (Portugal)	Pekka Petersen-Dyggve; João Lagos	6; 4	6; 4	6; 4

==== Soviet Union vs. Greece ====
Soviet Union
4
Tbilisi, Soviet Union
3–5 May 1968

Greece
1

			1	2	3	4	5
1	(Soviet Union) (Greece)	Toomas Leius; Nicholas Kalogeropoulos	10; 8	4; 6	4; 6	1; 6
2	(Soviet Union) (Greece)	Alex Metreveli; Periclis Gavrilidis	6; 2	6; 4	6; 3
3	(Soviet Union) (Greece)	Sergei Likhachev / Alex Metreveli; Periclis Gavrilidis / Nicholas Kalogeropoulos	6; 4	4; 6	6; 3	7; 5
4	(Soviet Union) (Greece)	Toomas Leius; Periclis Gavrilidis	6; 2	6; 1	6; 0
5	(Soviet Union) (Greece)	Alex Metreveli; Nicholas Kalogeropoulos	3; 6	6; 2	1; 6	8; 6	6; 2

==== Yugoslavia vs. New Zealand ====
Yugoslavia
4
Zagreb, Yugoslavia
3–5 May 1968

New Zealand
0

			1	2	3	4	5
1	(Socialist Federal Republic of Yugoslavia) (New Zealand)	Željko Franulović; Onny Parun	5; 7	7; 5	6; 1	6; 3
2	(Socialist Federal Republic of Yugoslavia) (New Zealand)	Boro Jovanović; Brian Fairlie	2; 6	7; 5	7; 5	6; 4
3	(Socialist Federal Republic of Yugoslavia) (New Zealand)	Željko Franulović / Boro Jovanović; Brian Fairlie / Richard Hawkes	6; 1	6; 4	6; 4
4	(Socialist Federal Republic of Yugoslavia) (New Zealand)	Boro Jovanović; Onny Parun	6; 0	6; 1	6; 2
5	(Socialist Federal Republic of Yugoslavia) (New Zealand)	Željko Franulović; Brian Fairlie	6; 2	7; 5	3; 6	1; 6	1; 2	not completed

==== Italy vs. Hungary ====
Italy
5
Cagliari, Italy
2–4 May 1968
Clay

Hungary
0

			1	2	3	4	5
1	(Italy) (Hungary)	Martin Mulligan; István Gulyás	6; 4	3; 6	6; 3	2; 6	7; 5
2	(Italy) (Hungary)	Nicola Pietrangeli; Péter Szőke	6; 3	6; 2	6; 1
3	(Italy) (Hungary)	Martin Mulligan / Nicola Pietrangeli; István Gulyás / András Szikszay	7; 5	9; 7	2; 6	11; 9
4	(Italy) (Hungary)	Nicola Pietrangeli; István Gulyás	6; 4	6; 2	2; 6	1; 6	7; 5
5	(Italy) (Hungary)	Martin Mulligan; Péter Szőke	4; 6	7; 5	6; 4	6; 1

==== Monaco vs. Ireland ====
Monaco
3
Monte Carlo, Monaco
26–28 April 1968

Ireland
1

			1	2	3	4	5
1	(Monaco) (Republic of Ireland)	Patrick Landau; Peter Mockler	6; 2	6; 3	5; 7	6; 2
2	(Monaco) (Republic of Ireland)	Adrien Viviani; Michael Hickey	4; 6	4; 6	2; 6
3	(Monaco) (Republic of Ireland)	Patrick Landau / Francis Truchi; Michael Hickey / Peter Jackson	5; 7	6; 4	6; 4	4; 6	6; 2
4	(Monaco) (Republic of Ireland)	Patrick Landau; Michael Hickey	4; 6	6; 4	8; 6	6; 4
5	(Monaco) (Republic of Ireland)	Adrien Viviani; Peter Mockler						not played

=== Quarterfinals ===
==== Spain vs. Sweden ====
Spain
4
Real Club de Tenis, Barcelona, Spain
24–26 May 1968
Clay

Sweden
1

			1	2	3	4	5
1	(Spain) (Sweden)	Juan Gisbert; Ove Bengtson	6; 2	6; 2	6; 3
2	(Spain) (Sweden)	Manuel Santana; Hans Nerell	6; 1	6; 4	6; 2
3	(Spain) (Sweden)	José Luis Arilla / Manuel Santana; Ove Bengtson / Hans Nerell	4; 6	5; 7	6; 4	5; 7
4	(Spain) (Sweden)	Juan Gisbert; Hans Nerell	10; 8	6; 0	7; 9	3; 6	7; 5
5	(Spain) (Sweden)	Manuel Santana; Ove Bengtson	6; 3	6; 2	6; 4

==== Great Britain vs. Finland ====
Great Britain
5
Queen's Club, London, England
23–25 May 1968
Grass

Finland
0

			1	2	3	4	5
1	(United Kingdom) (Finland)	Mike Sangster; Pekka Säilä	6; 4	8; 6	6; 4
2	(United Kingdom) (Finland)	Mark Cox; Pekka Petersen-Dyggve	6; 2	6; 4	6; 0
3	(United Kingdom) (Finland)	Paul Hutchins / Bobby Wilson; Heikki Hedman / Pekka Säilä	6; 1	6; 2	6; 1
4	(United Kingdom) (Finland)	Mike Sangster; Pekka Petersen-Dyggve	7; 5	6; 2	6; 2
5	(United Kingdom) (Finland)	Mark Cox; Pekka Säilä	6; 4	4; 6	6; 1	6; 4

==== Soviet Union vs. Yugoslavia ====
Soviet Union
5
Moscow, Soviet Union
24–26 May 1968

Yugoslavia
0

			1	2	3	4	5
1	(Soviet Union) (Socialist Federal Republic of Yugoslavia)	Alex Metreveli; Boro Jovanović	6; 3	6; 4	6; 4
2	(Soviet Union) (Socialist Federal Republic of Yugoslavia)	Toomas Leius; Željko Franulović	6; 3	2; 6	8; 6	7; 5
3	(Soviet Union) (Socialist Federal Republic of Yugoslavia)	Sergei Likhachev / Alex Metreveli; Željko Franulović / Boro Jovanović	6; 2	11; 9	8; 6
4	(Soviet Union) (Socialist Federal Republic of Yugoslavia)	Alex Metreveli; Željko Franulović	6; 3	6; 2	9; 7
5	(Soviet Union) (Socialist Federal Republic of Yugoslavia)	Toomas Leius; Boro Jovanović	7; 5	4; 6	6; 3	6; 2

==== Italy vs. Monaco ====
Italy
5
Biella, Italy
23–25 May 1968
Clay

Monaco
0

			1	2	3	4	5
1	(Italy) (Monaco)	Nicola Pietrangeli; André Vatrican	6; 1	6; 2	6; 1
2	(Italy) (Monaco)	Martin Mulligan; Francis Truchi	6; 0	6; 0	6; 1
3	(Italy) (Monaco)	Eugenio Castigliano / Ezio Di Matteo; Alain Manigley / Francis Truchi	6; 3	6; 1	6; 3
4	(Italy) (Monaco)	Martin Mulligan; Alain Manigley	6; 0	6; 0	6; 0
5	(Italy) (Monaco)	Eugenio Castigliano; Francis Truchi	6; 2	6; 2	6; 1

=== Semifinals ===
==== Spain vs. Great Britain ====
Spain
4
Real Club de Tenis, Barcelona, Spain
14–16 June 1968
Clay

Great Britain
1

			1	2	3	4	5
1	(Spain) (United Kingdom)	Manuel Santana; Mark Cox	6; 1	6; 3	6; 3
2	(Spain) (United Kingdom)	Juan Gisbert; Paul Hutchins	6; 1	6; 3	6; 1
3	(Spain) (United Kingdom)	Manuel Orantes / Manuel Santana; Mark Cox / Bobby Wilson	4; 6	6; 3	6; 3	6; 3
4	(Spain) (United Kingdom)	Manuel Santana; Paul Hutchins	6; 4	6; 3	6; 4
5	(Spain) (United Kingdom)	Juan Gisbert; Mark Cox	6; 4	3; 6	3; 6	3; 6

==== Italy vs. Soviet Union ====
Italy
3
Reggio Emilia, Italy
13–16 June 1968
Clay

Soviet Union
2

			1	2	3	4	5
1	(Italy) (Soviet Union)	Nicola Pietrangeli; Toomas Leius	6; 4	4; 6	6; 1	6; 2
2	(Italy) (Soviet Union)	Martin Mulligan; Alex Metreveli	3; 6	1; 6	3; 6
3	(Italy) (Soviet Union)	Martin Mulligan / Nicola Pietrangeli; Sergei Likhachev / Alex Metreveli	6; 3	4; 6	6; 2	6; 4
4	(Italy) (Soviet Union)	Nicola Pietrangeli; Alex Metreveli	0; 6	0; 6	1; 6
5	(Italy) (Soviet Union)	Martin Mulligan; Toomas Leius	6; 2	6; 4	7; 5

=== Final ===
==== Spain vs. Italy ====
Spain
3
Real Club de Tenis, Barcelona, Spain
19–21 July 1968
Clay

Italy
2

			1	2	3	4	5
1	(Spain) (Italy)	Juan Gisbert; Martin Mulligan	6; 4	2; 6	6; 2	6; 4
2	(Spain) (Italy)	Manuel Santana; Nicola Pietrangeli	6; 3	3; 6	4; 6	6; 4	6; 2
3	(Spain) (Italy)	José Luis Arilla / Manuel Orantes; Martin Mulligan / Nicola Pietrangeli	5; 7	2; 6	6; 3	3; 6
4	(Spain) (Italy)	Juan Gisbert; Nicola Pietrangeli	8; 6	6; 4	6; 2
5	(Spain) (Italy)	Manuel Orantes; Martin Mulligan	6; 4	6; 4	5; 7	3; 6	4; 4

== Zone B ==
=== Draw ===
First Round; 28 April–6 May
Sofia, Bulgaria
Bulgaria	5
Turkey	0
Freiburg, West Germany
Switzerland	1
West Germany	4
Brussels, Belgium
Belgium	3
Poland	2
Prague, Czechoslovakia (clay)
Czechoslovakia	3
Brazil	2
Luxembourg, Luxembourg (clay)
Luxembourg	1
Norway	4
Bucharest, Romania (clay)
Romania	4
Denmark	1
Tehran, Iran
Iran	4
Israel	1
Linz, Austria
Austria	0
South Africa	5

Quarterfinals; 17–26 May
Sofia, Bulgaria
Bulgaria	0
West Germany	5
Brussels, Belgium (clay)
Belgium	2
Czechoslovakia	3
Oslo, Norway (clay)
Norway	0
Romania	5
Tehran, Iran
Iran	0
South Africa	5

Semifinals; 14–16 June
Munich, West Germany (clay)
West Germany	4
Czechoslovakia	1
Romania
South Africa	w/o

Final; 19–21 July
Düsseldorf, West Germany
West Germany	3
South Africa	2

=== First round ===
==== Bulgaria vs. Turkey ====
Bulgaria
5
Sofia, Bulgaria
3–5 May 1968

Turkey
0

			1	2	3	4	5
1	(Bulgaria) (Turkey)	Kiril Yashmakov; Remzi Aydın	6; 1	6; 2	6; 3
2	(Bulgaria) (Turkey)	Stojan Velev; Tahsin Gürsoy	6; 0	6; 0	6; 2
3	(Bulgaria) (Turkey)	Ljuben Genov / Kiril Yashmakov; Remzi Aydın / Nur Gurak	6; 3	3; 6	9; 11	6; 3	6; 4
4	(Bulgaria) (Turkey)	Ljuben Genov; Tahsin Gürsoy	6; 1	6; 4	3; 6	6; 4
5	(Bulgaria) (Turkey)	Stojan Velev; Remzi Aydın	6; 1	6; 1	6; 0

==== West Germany vs. Switzerland ====
West Germany
4
Freiburg, West Germany
3–6 May 1968

Switzerland
1

			1	2	3	4	5
1	(West Germany) (Switzerland)	Wilhelm Bungert; Theodor Stalder	6; 4	6; 2	7; 5
2	(West Germany) (Switzerland)	Ingo Buding; Dimitri Sturdza	10; 8	6; 1	6; 8	6; 1
3	(West Germany) (Switzerland)	Jürgen Fassbender / Karl Meiler; Dimitri Sturdza / Matthias Werren	6; 4	2; 6	6; 4	1; 6	4; 6
4	(West Germany) (Switzerland)	Ingo Buding; Theodor Stalder	6; 1	11; 9	6; 1
5	(West Germany) (Switzerland)	Wilhelm Bungert; Dimitri Sturdza	1; 6	6; 2	2; 6	6; 2	7; 5

==== Belgium vs. Poland ====
Belgium
3
Brussels, Belgium
3–5 May 1968

Poland
2

			1	2	3	4	5
1	(Belgium) (Poland)	Eric Drossart; Bronisław Lewandowski	6; 2	6; 4	5; 7	2; 6	7; 5
2	(Belgium) (Poland)	Patrick Hombergen; Wiesław Gąsiorek	6; 4	1; 6	1; 6	1; 6
3	(Belgium) (Poland)	Eric Drossart / Patrick Hombergen; Wiesław Gąsiorek / Tadeusz Nowicki	6; 3	4; 6	6; 4	6; 2
4	(Belgium) (Poland)	Eric Drossart; Wiesław Gąsiorek	1; 6	2; 6	2; 6
5	(Belgium) (Poland)	Patrick Hombergen; Bronisław Lewandowski	6; 4	4; 6	6; 3	3; 6	6; 2

==== Czechoslovakia vs. Brazil ====
Czechoslovakia
3
Prague, Czechoslovakia
3–5 May 1968
Clay

Brazil
2

			1	2	3	4	5
1	(Czechoslovakia) (Brazil)	Jan Kodeš; Thomaz Koch	6; 2	6; 3	3; 6	7; 5
2	(Czechoslovakia) (Brazil)	Jan Kukal; José Edison Mandarino	3; 6	6; 4	2; 6	1; 6
3	(Czechoslovakia) (Brazil)	Milan Holeček / Jan Kodeš; Thomaz Koch / José Edison Mandarino	6; 4	6; 4	4; 6	7; 5
4	(Czechoslovakia) (Brazil)	Jan Kukal; Thomaz Koch	4; 6	2; 6	4; 6
5	(Czechoslovakia) (Brazil)	Jan Kodeš; José Edison Mandarino	8; 6	6; 4	8; 6

==== Luxembourg vs. Norway ====
Luxembourg
1
Luxembourg, Luxembourg
3–6 May 1968
Clay

Norway
4

			1	2	3	4	5
1	(Luxembourg) (Norway)	Thierry Brasseur; Frithjof Prydz	2; 6	6; 8	4; 6
2	(Luxembourg) (Norway)	Frank Baden; Nils Elvik	7; 9	4; 6	6; 1	6; 2	8; 6
3	(Luxembourg) (Norway)	Frank Baden / Thierry Brasseur; Erik Melander / Jon-Erik Ross	5; 7	6; 8	5; 7
4	(Luxembourg) (Norway)	Thierry Brasseur; Nils Elvik	3; 6	3; 6	2; 6
5	(Luxembourg) (Norway)	Frank Baden; Frithjof Prydz	3; 6	3; 6	6; 3	6; 4	2; 6

==== Romania vs. Denmark ====
Romania
4
Bucharest, Romania
28–30 April 1968
Clay

Denmark
1

			1	2	3	4	5
1	(Romania) (Denmark)	Ilie Năstase; Torben Ulrich	6; 4	6; 4	6; 2
2	(Romania) (Denmark)	Ion Țiriac; Jørgen Ulrich	6; 0	2; 6	6; 4	9; 7
3	(Romania) (Denmark)	Ilie Năstase / Ion Țiriac; Jan Leschly / Torben Ulrich	6; 3	7; 9	2; 6	3; 6
4	(Romania) (Denmark)	Ion Țiriac; Torben Ulrich	6; 1	6; 3	6; 1
5	(Romania) (Denmark)	Ilie Năstase; Jørgen Ulrich	6; 2	11; 9	4; 6	4; 6	6; 4

==== Iran vs. Israel ====
Iran
4
Tehran, Iran
3–5 May 1968

Israel
1

			1	2	3	4	5
1	(Iran) (Israel)	Hussain Akbari; Josef Stabholz	6; 2	6; 2	5; 7	6; 3
2	(Iran) (Israel)	Taghi Akbari; Eleazar Davidman	7; 5	6; 4	6; 4
3	(Iran) (Israel)	Issa Khodaei / Ezzatollah Nemati; Eleazar Davidman / Ian Froman	6; 1	6; 4	6; 4
4	(Iran) (Israel)	Taghi Akbari; Josef Stabholz	6; 1	6; 2	8; 6
5	(Iran) (Israel)	Hussain Akbari; Eleazar Davidman	1; 6	2; 6	3; 6

==== Austria vs. South Africa ====
Austria
0
Linz, Austria
3–5 May 1968

South Africa
5

			1	2	3	4	5
1	(Austria) (South Africa)	Detlef Herdy; Ray Moore	1; 6	2; 6	4; 6
2	(Austria) (South Africa)	Dieter Schultheiss; Bob Hewitt	1; 6	1; 6	3; 6
3	(Austria) (South Africa)	Detlef Herdy / Fritz Kolbinger; Bob Hewitt / Frew McMillan	3; 6	1; 6	2; 6
4	(Austria) (South Africa)	Dieter Schultheiss; Ray Moore	0; 6	2; 6	1; 6
5	(Austria) (South Africa)	Detlef Herdy; Frew McMillan	4; 6	6; 4	4; 6	0; 6

=== Quarterfinals ===
==== Bulgaria vs. West Germany ====
Bulgaria
0
Sofia, Bulgaria
17–19 May 1968

West Germany
5

			1	2	3	4	5
1	(Bulgaria) (West Germany)	Stojan Velev; Ingo Buding	4; 6	1; 6	3; 6
2	(Bulgaria) (West Germany)	Kiril Yashmakov; Wilhelm Bungert	2; 6	0; 6	5; 7
3	(Bulgaria) (West Germany)	Stojan Velev / Kiril Yashmakov; Jürgen Fassbender / Karl Meiler	9; 11	2; 6	2; 6
4	(Bulgaria) (West Germany)	Kiril Yashmakov; Ingo Buding	3; 6	2; 6	2; 6
5	(Bulgaria) (West Germany)	Stojan Velev; Wilhelm Bungert	6; 3	1; 6	1; 6	3; 6

==== Belgium vs. Czechoslovakia ====
Belgium
2
Brussels, Belgium
24–26 May 1968
Clay

Czechoslovakia
3

			1	2	3	4	5
1	(Belgium) (Czechoslovakia)	Eric Drossart; Jan Kodeš	6; 4	3; 6	6; 4	2; 6	1; 6
2	(Belgium) (Czechoslovakia)	Patrick Hombergen; Milan Holeček	6; 4	7; 5	3; 6	9; 7
3	(Belgium) (Czechoslovakia)	Eric Drossart / Claude De Gronckel; Milan Holeček / Jan Kodeš	3; 6	1; 6	2; 6
4	(Belgium) (Czechoslovakia)	Patrick Hombergen; Jan Kodeš	3; 6	2; 6	6; 4	6; 2	6; 4
5	(Belgium) (Czechoslovakia)	Eric Drossart; Milan Holeček	3; 6	1; 6	6; 3	7; 5	2; 6

==== Norway vs. Romania ====
Norway
0
Oslo, Norway
24–26 May 1968
Clay

Romania
5

			1	2	3	4	5
1	(Norway) (Romania)	Frithjof Prydz; Ilie Năstase	6; 4	0; 6	6; 8	0; 6
2	(Norway) (Romania)	Nils Elvik; Ion Țiriac	2; 6	2; 6	4; 6
3	(Norway) (Romania)	Erik Melander / Jon-Erik Ross; Ilie Năstase / Ion Țiriac	2; 6	6; 8	3; 6
4	(Norway) (Romania)	Nils Elvik; Ilie Năstase	2; 6	3; 6	1; 6
5	(Norway) (Romania)	Frithjof Prydz; Ion Țiriac	1; 6	4; 6	2; 6

==== Iran vs. South Africa ====
Iran
0
Tehran, Iran
24–26 May 1968

South Africa
5

			1	2	3	4	5
1	(Iran) (South Africa)	Taghi Akbari; Bob Hewitt	4; 6	8; 10	3; 6
2	(Iran) (South Africa)	Issa Khodaei; Bob Maud	4; 6	3; 6	3; 6
3	(Iran) (South Africa)	Issa Khodaei / Ezzat Nemati; Bob Hewitt / Frew McMillan	2; 6	2; 6	2; 6
4	(Iran) (South Africa)	Issa Khodaei; Bob Hewitt	4; 6	1; 6	2; 6
5	(Iran) (South Africa)	Taghi Akbari; Bob Maud	5; 7	3; 6	1; 6

=== Semifinals ===
==== West Germany vs. Czechoslovakia ====
West Germany
4
Munich, West Germany
14–16 June 1968
Clay

Czechoslovakia
1

			1	2	3	4	5
1	(West Germany) (Czechoslovakia)	Wilhelm Bungert; Jan Kodeš	6; 2	6; 4	6; 0
2	(West Germany) (Czechoslovakia)	Ingo Buding; Milan Holeček	6; 1	3; 6	2; 6	3; 6
3	(West Germany) (Czechoslovakia)	Ingo Buding / Wilhelm Bungert; Milan Holeček / Jan Kodeš	5; 7	6; 1	7; 5	3; 6	12; 10
4	(West Germany) (Czechoslovakia)	Ingo Buding; Jan Kodeš	8; 6	6; 3	6; 3
5	(West Germany) (Czechoslovakia)	Wilhelm Bungert; Milan Holeček	8; 6	6; 3	6; 4

=== Final ===
==== West Germany vs. South Africa ====
West Germany
3
Düsseldorf, West Germany
19–21 July 1968

South Africa
2

			1	2	3	4	5
1	(West Germany) (South Africa)	Wilhelm Bungert; Bob Hewitt	9; 7	7; 5	7; 5
2	(West Germany) (South Africa)	Ingo Buding; Ray Moore	6; 3	4; 6	10; 8	6; 8	6; 4
3	(West Germany) (South Africa)	Ingo Buding / Jürgen Fassbender; Bob Hewitt / Frew McMillan	4; 6	2; 6	4; 6
4	(West Germany) (South Africa)	Wilhelm Bungert; Ray Moore	6; 1	6; 1	6; 1
5	(West Germany) (South Africa)	Ingo Buding; Bob Hewitt	5; 7	2; 6	6; 2	3; 6
