= 1979 Egyptian Open =

1970s African professional tennis tournament

- Date: 9–15 April
- Edition: 4th
- Category: Grand Prix
- Draw: 32S / 16D
- Prize money: $75,000
- Surface: Clay / outdoor
- Location: Cairo, Egypt

Champions

Singles
- (Austria) Peter Feigl

Doubles
- (Australia) Peter McNamara / (Australia) Paul McNamee
← 1978 ·	Egyptian Open	· 1980 →

The 1979 Egyptian Open was a men's tennis tournament played on outdoor clay courts that was part of the 1979 Colgate-Palmolive Grand Prix . It was the fourth edition of the tournament and was played in Cairo, Egypt from 9 April until 15 April 1979. Third-seeded Peter Feigl won the singles title.

== Finals ==
=== Singles ===
(Austria) Peter Feigl defeated (Brazil) Carlos Kirmayr 7–5, 3–6, 6–1

- It was Feigl's 1st singles title of the year and the 2nd of his career.

=== Doubles ===
(Australia) Peter McNamara / (Australia) Paul McNamee defeated (India) Anand Amritraj / (India) Vijay Amritraj 7–5, 6–4
