= 1968 Davis Cup Eastern Zone =

Zone of the 1968 Davis Cup

The Eastern Zone was one of the three regional zones of the 1968 Davis Cup.

9 teams entered the Eastern Zone, competing across 2 sub-zones. The winner of each sub-zones would play against each other to determine who would compete in the Inter-Zonal Zone against the winners of the Americas Zone and Europe Zone.

Japan defeated the Philippines in the Zone A final, and India defeated Ceylon in the Zone B final. In the Inter-Zonal final India defeated Japan and progressed to the Inter-Zonal Zone.

== Zone A ==
=== Draw ===
Quarterfinals
Indonesia	w/o
South Vietnam
Philippines
bye
bye
South Korea
bye
Japan

Semifinals; 23–25 March; 26–28 April
Manila, Philippines
Indonesia	1
Philippines	4
Tokyo, Japan
South Korea	0
Japan	5

Final; 10–12 May
Tokyo, Japan
Philippines	1
Japan	4

=== Semifinals ===
==== Philippines vs. Indonesia ====
Philippines
4
Manila, Philippines
26–28 April 1968

Indonesia
1

			1	2	3	4	5
1	(Philippines) (Indonesia)	Eduardo Cruz; Diko Murdono	4; 6	6; 2	6; 2	6; 3
2	(Philippines) (Indonesia)	Felicisimo Ampon; Gondo Widjojo	6; 4	3; 6	6; 3	3; 0		retired
3	(Philippines) (Indonesia)	Federico Deyro / Miguel Dungo; Sutarjo Sugiarto / Gondo Widjojo	2; 6	3; 6	6; 4	3; 6
4	(Philippines) (Indonesia)	Eduardo Cruz; Gondo Widjojo	6; 2	6; 3	4; 6	6; 3
5	(Philippines) (Indonesia)	Felicisimo Ampon; Diko Murdono	7; 5	4; 6	6; 1	6; 1

==== Japan vs. South Korea ====
Japan
5
Tokyo, Japan
23–25 March 1968

South Korea
0

			1	2	3	4	5
1	(Japan) (South Korea)	Toshiro Sakai; Lee Ek-son	6; 1	6; 2	6; 8	6; 1
2	(Japan) (South Korea)	Koji Watanabe; Chung Yong-ho	6; 1	6; 1	6; 4
3	(Japan) (South Korea)	Isao Watanabe / Koji Watanabe; Chung Yong-ho / Kim Moon-il	6; 4	6; 4	6; 2
4	(Japan) (South Korea)	Jun Kamiwazumi; Kim Moon-il	8; 6	8; 6	6; 1
5	(Japan) (South Korea)	Toshiro Sakai; Chung Yong-ho	6; 1	6; 1	6; 1

=== Final ===
==== Japan vs. Philippines ====
Japan
4
Tokyo, Japan
10–12 May 1969

Philippines
1

			1	2	3	4	5
1	(Japan) (Philippines)	Ichizō Konishi; Felicisimo Ampon	1; 6	6; 1	8; 6	6; 2
2	(Japan) (Philippines)	Koji Watanabe; Eduardo Cruz	4; 6	6; 2	6; 0	6; 2
3	(Japan) (Philippines)	Isao Watanabe / Koji Watanabe; Eduardo Cruz / Federico Deyro	6; 1	6; 2	6; 2
4	(Japan) (Philippines)	Ichizō Konishi; Eduardo Cruz	6; 1	6; 0	6; 4
5	(Japan) (Philippines)	Toshiro Sakai; Felicisimo Ampon	5; 7	6; 1	4; 6	3; 6

== Zone B ==
=== Draw ===
Semifinals; 20–22 March
Colombo, Ceylon (clay)
Malaysia	1
Ceylon	4
bye
India

Final; 26–28 April
Guwahati, India
Ceylon	2
India	3

=== Semifinals ===
==== Ceylon vs. Malaysia ====
Ceylon
4
Ceylon Lawn Tennis Association, Colombo, Ceylon
20–22 March 1968
Clay

Malaysia
1

			1	2	3	4	5
1	(Dominion of Ceylon) (Malaysia)	Bernard Pinto; Sultan-Aman Azman	4; 6	4; 6	6; 3	6; 3	4; 6
2	(Dominion of Ceylon) (Malaysia)	Senaka Kumara; Billy Yap	6; 0	6; 2	6; 4
3	(Dominion of Ceylon) (Malaysia)	Rupert Ferdinands / Bernard Pinto; Sultan-Aman Azman / Moses Tay	8; 6	6; 2	7; 5
4	(Dominion of Ceylon) (Malaysia)	Bernard Pinto; Billy Yap	6; 3	6; 3	7; 5
5	(Dominion of Ceylon) (Malaysia)	Senaka Kumara; Sultan-Aman Azman	8; 6	6; 3	6; 2

=== Final ===
==== India vs. Ceylon ====
India
3
Guwahati, India
26–28 April 1968

Ceylon
2

			1	2	3	4	5
1	(India) (Dominion of Ceylon)	Shyam Minotra; Rupert Ferdinands	6; 2	5; 7	6; 2	6; 8	8; 6
2	(India) (Dominion of Ceylon)	Jaidip Mukerjea; Senaka Kumara	5; 7	6; 4	6; 3	6; 2
3	(India) (Dominion of Ceylon)	Anand Amritraj / Gaurav Misra; Rupert Ferdinands / Senaka Kumara	6; 4	6; 4	6; 4
4	(India) (Dominion of Ceylon)	Anand Amritraj; Rupert Ferdinands	5; 7	6; 4	1; 6	7; 9
5	(India) (Dominion of Ceylon)	Shyam Minotra; Senaka Kumara	2; 6	1; 6	6; 2	0; 6

== Eastern Inter-Zonal Final ==
=== Japan vs. India ===
Japan
1
Tokyo, Japan
21–23 September 1968

India
4

			1	2	3	4	5
1	(Japan) (India)	Keishiro Yanagi; Premjit Lall	2; 6	4; 6	3; 6
2	(Japan) (India)	Koji Watanabe; Ramanathan Krishnan	2; 6	6; 3	3; 6	2; 6
3	(Japan) (India)	Isao Watanabe / Koji Watanabe; Ramanathan Krishnan / Jaidip Mukerjea	2; 6	2; 6	7; 5	6; 1	0; 6
4	(Japan) (India)	Keishiro Yanagi; Ramanathan Krishnan	4; 6	3; 6	1; 6
5	(Japan) (India)	Koji Watanabe; Premjit Lall	8; 6	6; 1	6; 2
