= 1977 Cairo Open =

- Date: March 21–27
- Edition: 2nd
- Category: Independent
- Draw: 16S / 8D
- Prize money: $30,000
- Surface: Clay / outdoor
- Location: Cairo, Egypt

Champions

Singles
- (France) François Jauffret

Doubles
- (Australia) John Bartlett / (Australia) John Marks
| ← 1975 · | Cairo Open | · 1978 → |

The 1977 Cairo Open was a men's tennis tournament played on outdoor clay courts. It was an independent tournament i.e. not part of the 1977 Colgate-Palmolive Grand Prix circuit. It was the second edition of the tournament and was played in Cairo, Egypt from 21 March until 27 March 1977. First-seeded François Jauffret won the singles title.

== Finals ==
=== Singles ===
(France) François Jauffret defeated (West Germany) Frank Gebert 6–3, 7–5, 6–4

=== Doubles ===
(Australia) John Bartlett / (Australia) John Marks defeated (United States) Pat DuPré / (United Kingdom) Chris Lewis 7–5, 6–1, 6–3
