= 1973 Torneo Godó – Singles =

Singles
- 1973 Torneo Godó

Final
- Champion: (Romania) Ilie Năstase
- Runner-up: (Spain) Manuel Orantes
- Score: 2–6, 6–1, 8–6, 6–4

Details
- Draw: 58
- Seeds: 8

Events
Singles	Doubles
← 1972 ·	Barcelona Open	· 1974 →

The 1973 Torneo Godó – Singles was an event of the 1973 Torneo Godó tennis tournament and was played on outdoor clay courts at the Real Club de Tenis Barcelona in Barcelona, Spain between 8 October and 14 October 1973. Jan Kodeš was the defending Torneo Godó champion but was defeated in the semifinals. First-seeded Ilie Năstase won the title by defeating second-seeded Manuel Orantes in the final, 2–6, 6–1, 8–6, 6–4.

== Seeds ==
1. (Romania) Ilie Năstase (champion)
2. (Spain) Manuel Orantes (final)
3. (Netherlands) Tom Okker (second round)
4. (Czechoslovakia) Jan Kodeš (semifinals)
5. (Australia) Rod Laver (third round)
6. (withdrew)
7. (Socialist Federal Republic of Yugoslavia) Nikola Pilić (second round)
8. (Italy) Adriano Panatta (second round)

Click on the seed number of a player to go to their draw section.

== Draw ==
=== Key ===
- Q = Qualifier
- WC = Wild card
- LL = Lucky loser
- Alt = Alternate
- SE = Special exempt
- PR = Protected ranking
- ITF = ITF entry
- JE = Junior exempt
- w/o = Walkover
- r = Retired
- d = Defaulted
- SR = Special ranking

=== Finals ===
Quarterfinals
2	(Spain) Manuel Orantes	6	6
(United Kingdom) Buster Mottram	2	2
(Rhodesia) Andrew Pattison	9	1
(Sweden) Björn Borg	11	6
(Australia) Barry Phillips-Moore	5	6	4
4	(Czechoslovakia) Jan Kodeš	7	2	6
(Spain) José Higueras	3	3
1	(Romania) Ilie Năstase	6	6

Semifinals
2	(Spain) Manuel Orantes	6	6	6
(Sweden) Björn Borg	3	2	3
4	(Czechoslovakia) Jan Kodeš	1	6	0	3
1	(Romania) Ilie Năstase	6	4	6	6

Final
2	(Spain) Manuel Orantes	6	1	6	4
1	(Romania) Ilie Năstase	2	6	8	6

=== Top half ===
==== Section 1 ====
First Round
(France) Patrick Proisy	6	2	3
(Argentina) Julián Ganzábal	1	6	6
7	(Socialist Federal Republic of Yugoslavia) Nikola Pilić	2	6	6
(France) Wanaro N'Godrella	6	3	3
(South Africa) Raymond Moore	2	2
(United Kingdom) Buster Mottram	6	6
(Italy) Paolo Bertolucci	7	2
(Egypt) Ismail El Shafei	5	0^{r}
(South Africa) Frew McMillan	6	0
(Spain) Antonio Muñoz	8	6

Second Round
2	(Spain) Manuel Orantes	6	6
(Spain) Alberto Martorell	3	1
(Germany) Harald Elschenbroich	4	2
(Argentina) Julián Ganzábal	6	6
7	(Socialist Federal Republic of Yugoslavia) Nikola Pilić	3	3
(United Kingdom) Buster Mottram	6	6
(Italy) Paolo Bertolucci	1	6	8
(Spain) Antonio Muñoz	6	3	6

Third Round
2	(Spain) Manuel Orantes	2	6	6
(Argentina) Julián Ganzábal	6	4	4
(United Kingdom) Buster Mottram	6	6
(Italy) Paolo Bertolucci	4	2

Quarterfinals
2	(Spain) Manuel Orantes	6	6
(United Kingdom) Buster Mottram	2	2

==== Section 2 ====
First Round
3	(Netherlands) Tom Okker	8	6
(Czechoslovakia) Jiří Hřebec	6	1
(Sweden) Kjell Johansson	6	6
(United Kingdom) Mark Farrell	4	0
(Spain) Juan Ignacio Muntañola	2	4
(New Zealand) Onny Parun	6	6
(Rhodesia) Andrew Pattison	4	6	6
(Czechoslovakia) Vladimír Zedník	6	3	4
(Pakistan) Haroon Rahim	2	10
(Australia) Bob Rheinberger	6	12
(Chile) Jaime Fillol	6	6
(Socialist Federal Republic of Yugoslavia) Nikola Špear	4	1
(Australia) Bob Carmichael	0	2
(Sweden) Björn Borg	6	6
(Chile) Patricio Rodríguez	6	0
(Italy) Tonino Zugarelli	1	4^{r}

Second Round
3	(Netherlands) Tom Okker	0	4
(Sweden) Kjell Johansson	6	6
(New Zealand) Onny Parun	4	6	7
(Rhodesia) Andrew Pattison	6	1	9
(Australia) Bob Rheinberger	2	3
(Chile) Jaime Fillol	6	6
(Sweden) Björn Borg	6	6
(Chile) Patricio Rodríguez	2	2

Third Round
(Sweden) Kjell Johansson	6	4	1
(Rhodesia) Andrew Pattison	4	6	6
(Chile) Jaime Fillol	2	4
(Sweden) Björn Borg	6	6

Quarterfinals
(Rhodesia) Andrew Pattison	9	1
(Sweden) Björn Borg	11	6

=== Bottom half ===
==== Section 3 ====
First Round
(France) Jean-Baptiste Chanfreau	7	0	2
(West Germany) Attila Korpás	5	6	6
(Australia) Barry Phillips-Moore	6	6
(Spain) Luis Bruguera	1	1
(Colombia) Iván Molina	5	1
(Argentina) Guillermo Vilas	7	6
(Spain) Juan Herrera	1	1
5	(Australia) Rod Laver	6	6
(France) Pierre Barthès	3	6	6
(Spain) Jose Guerrero	6	3	1
(United States) Eddie Dibbs	6	7
(Spain) Jose A. Moreno	1	5
(New Zealand) Tony Parun	2	4
(United Kingdom) Colin Dowdeswell	6	6
(United Kingdom) Gerald Battrick	2	4
4	(Czechoslovakia) Jan Kodeš	6	6

Second Round
(West Germany) Attila Korpás	4	5
(Australia) Barry Phillips-Moore	6	7
(Argentina) Guillermo Vilas	7	3	5
5	(Australia) Rod Laver	5	6	7
(France) Pierre Barthès	4	6	4
(United States) Eddie Dibbs	6	0	6
(United Kingdom) Colin Dowdeswell	3	3
4	(Czechoslovakia) Jan Kodeš	6	6

Third Round
(Australia) Barry Phillips-Moore	6	7
5	(Australia) Rod Laver	3	5
(United States) Eddie Dibbs	3	3
4	(Czechoslovakia) Jan Kodeš	6	6

Quarterfinals
(Australia) Barry Phillips-Moore	5	6	4
4	(Czechoslovakia) Jan Kodeš	7	2	6

==== Section 4 ====
First Round
(France) Georges Goven	4	7	2
(Spain) José Higueras	6	5	6
(Australia) Ray Keldie	4
(United Kingdom) Mark Cox	0^{r}
(Romania) Ion Țiriac	2	1
(Italy) Corrado Barazzutti	6	6
(Spain) Felix Morey	1	2
8	(Italy) Adriano Panatta	6	6
(Chile) Jaime Pinto Bravo	6	6
(Greece) Nicolas Kelaidis	3	2

Second Round
(Spain) José Higueras	6	6
(Australia) Ray Keldie	4	4
(Italy) Corrado Barazzutti	4	8	6
8	(Italy) Adriano Panatta	6	6	3
(Chile) Jaime Pinto Bravo	4
(Spain) Juan Gisbert Sr.	4^{r}
(Brazil) José Edison Mandarino	7	4
1	(Romania) Ilie Năstase	9	6

Third Round
(Spain) José Higueras	6	6
(Italy) Corrado Barazzutti	4	0
(Chile) Jaime Pinto Bravo	6	2	2
1	(Romania) Ilie Năstase	3	6	6

Quarterfinals
(Spain) José Higueras	3	3
1	(Romania) Ilie Năstase	6	6
