= 1973 Torneo Godó =

- Date: 8–14 October
- Edition: 21st
- Category: Grand Prix circuit (Group A)
- Draw: 64S / 64D
- Prize money: $75,000
- Surface: Clay / outdoor
- Location: Barcelona, Spain
- Venue: Real Club de Tenis Barcelona

Champions

Singles
- (Romania) Ilie Năstase

Doubles
- (Romania) Ilie Năstase / (Netherlands) Tom Okker
← 1972 ·	Torneo Godó	· 1974 →

The 1973 Torneo Godó or Trofeo Conde de Godó, also known as the Spanish Open Championships, was a men's tennis tournament that took place on outdoor clay courts at the Real Club de Tenis Barcelona in Barcelona, Spain. It was the 21st edition of the tournament and was part of the 1973 Grand Prix circuit. It was held from 8 October until 14 October 1973. First-seeded Ilie Năstase won the singles title.

== Finals ==
=== Singles ===
(Romania) Ilie Năstase defeated (Spain) Manuel Orantes 2–6, 6–1, 8–6, 6–4

- It was Năstase's 13th singles title of the year and the 34th of his career.

=== Doubles ===
(Romania) Ilie Năstase / (Netherlands) Tom Okker defeated (Spain) Antonio Muñoz / (Spain) Manuel Orantes 4–6, 6–3, 6–2
