= 1980 Egyptian Open =

1970s African professional tennis tournament

- Date: 3–9 March
- Edition: 5th
- Category: Grand Prix
- Draw: 32S / 16D
- Prize money: $75,000
- Surface: Clay / outdoor
- Location: Cairo, Egypt

Champions

Singles
- (Italy) Corrado Barazzutti

Doubles
- (Netherlands) Tom Okker / (Egypt) Ismail El Shafei
← 1979 ·	Egyptian Open	· 1981 →

The 1980 Egyptian Open was a men's tennis tournament played on outdoor clay courts that was part of the 1980 Volvo Grand Prix circuit. It was the fifth edition of the tournament and was played in Cairo, Egypt from 3 March until 9 March 1980. First-seeded Corrado Barazzutti won the singles title.

== Finals ==
=== Singles ===
(Italy) Corrado Barazzutti defeated (Italy) Paolo Bertolucci 6–4, 6–0

- It was Barazzutti's 1st singles title of the year and the 5th and last of his career.

=== Doubles ===
(Netherlands) Tom Okker / (Egypt) Ismail El Shafei defeated (France) Christophe Freyss / (France) Bernard Fritz 6–3, 3–6, 6–3
