= 1968 Davis Cup Americas Zone =

International tennis competition

The Americas Zone was one of the three regional zones of the 1968 Davis Cup.

9 teams entered the Americas Zone: 4 teams competed in the North & Central America Zone, while 5 teams competed in the South America Zone. The winner of each sub-zone would play against each other to determine who moved to the Inter-Zonal Zone to compete against the winners of the Eastern Zone and Europe Zone.

The United States defeated Mexico in the North & Central America Zone final, and Ecuador defeated Chile in the South America Zone final. In the Americas Inter-Zonal Final, the United States defeated Ecuador and progressed to the Inter-Zonal Zone.

== North & Central America Zone ==
=== Draw ===
Semifinals; 3–13 May
Richmond, VA, United States (hard)
United States	5
Caribbean/West Indies	0
Mexico City, Mexico (clay)
Canada	0
Mexico	5

Final; 24–26 May
Berkeley, CA, United States (hard)
United States	5
Mexico	0

=== Semifinals ===
==== United States vs. Caribbean/West Indies ====
United States
5
Byrd Park, Richmond, VA, United States
3–5 May 1968
Hard

Caribbean/West Indies
0

			1	2	3	4	5
1	(United States) (Cricket West Indies)	Clark Graebner; Richard Russell	6; 1	7; 5	6; 2
2	(United States) (Cricket West Indies)	Arthur Ashe; Lance Lumsden	6; 1	6; 1	6; 0
3	(United States) (Cricket West Indies)	Bob Lutz / Stan Smith; Lance Lumsden / Richard Russell	6; 2	6; 3	6; 3
4	(United States) (Cricket West Indies)	Arthur Ashe; Richard Russell	6; 3	6; 2	6; 4
5	(United States) (Cricket West Indies)	Bob Lutz; Lance Lumsden	6; 0	6; 2	6; 1

==== Mexico vs. Canada ====
Mexico
5
Centro Deportivo Chapultepec, Mexico City, Mexico
11–13 May 1968
Clay

Canada
0

			1	2	3	4	5
1	(Mexico) (Canada)	Rafael Osuna; Henry Fauquier	6; 3	6; 2	6; 4
2	(Mexico) (Canada)	Joaquín Loyo Mayo; Mike Belkin	16; 14	4; 6	6; 3	6; 3
3	(Mexico) (Canada)	Rafael Osuna / Vicente Zarazúa; Mike Belkin / Keith Carpenter	6; 3	6; 4	6; 3
4	(Mexico) (Canada)	Joaquín Loyo Mayo; Henry Fauquier	6; 3	1; 6	1; 6	6; 0	6; 3
5	(Mexico) (Canada)	Rafael Osuna; Keith Carpenter	6; 2	6; 3	6; 2

=== Final ===
==== United States vs. Mexico ====
United States
5
Berkeley Tennis Club, Berkeley, CA, United States
24–26 May 1968
Hard

Mexico
0

			1	2	3	4	5
1	(United States) (Mexico)	Arthur Ashe; Rafael Osuna	6; 0	6; 3	6; 0
2	(United States) (Mexico)	Clark Graebner; Joaquín Loyo Mayo	6; 3	8; 6	4; 6	6; 4
3	(United States) (Mexico)	Bob Lutz / Stan Smith; Rafael Osuna / Vicente Zarazúa	4; 6	6; 3	9; 7	10; 8
4	(United States) (Mexico)	Clark Graebner; Rafael Osuna	10; 8	6; 3	6; 2
5	(United States) (Mexico)	Arthur Ashe; Joaquín Loyo Mayo	6; 4	8; 6	6; 2

== South America Zone ==
=== Draw ===
Quarterfinals; 27–29 April
Caracas, Venezuela
Venezuela	3
Argentina	2
Ecuador
bye
bye
Peru
bye
Chile

Semifinals; 29–31 March; 11–13 May
Caracas, Venezuela (hard)
Venezuela	0
Ecuador	3
Lima, Peru
Peru	0
Chile	5

Final; 24–27 May
Guayaquil, Ecuador (clay)
Ecuador	3
Chile	1

=== Quarterfinals ===
==== Venezuela vs. Argentina ====
Venezuela
3
Caracas, Venezuela
27–29 April 1968

Argentina
2

			1	2	3	4	5
1	(Venezuela) (Argentina)	Humphrey Hose; Tito Vázquez	4; 6	6; 3	8; 6	6; 1
2	(Venezuela) (Argentina)	Jorge Andrew; Norberto Herrero	13; 15	6; 4	7; 5	6; 4
3	(Venezuela) (Argentina)	Humphrey Hose / Julio Moros; Roberto Aubone / Tito Vázquez	1; 6	4; 6	8; 10
4	(Venezuela) (Argentina)	Jorge Andrew; Tito Vázquez	1; 6	4; 6	1; 6
5	(Venezuela) (Argentina)	Humphrey Hose; Norberto Herrero	6; 2	6; 2	6; 2

=== Semifinals ===
==== Venezuela vs. Ecuador ====
Venezuela
0
Caracas, Venezuela
11–13 May 1968
Hard

Ecuador
3

			1	2	3	4	5
1	(Venezuela) (Ecuador)	Julio Moros; Miguel Olvera	3; 6	3; 6	4; 6
2	(Venezuela) (Ecuador)	Jorge Andrew; Pancho Guzmán	6; 2	2; 6	3; 6	2; 6
3	(Venezuela) (Ecuador)	Jorge Andrew / Ivon Savy; Pancho Guzmán / Miguel Olvera	2; 6	3; 6	1; 6
4	(Venezuela) (Ecuador)	Jorge Andrew; Miguel Olvera						not played
5	(Venezuela) (Ecuador)	Julio Moros; Pancho Guzmán						not played

==== Peru vs. Chile ====
Peru
0
Lima, Peru
29–31 March 1968

Chile
5

			1	2	3	4	5
1	(Peru) (Chile)	Tomás González; Jaime Pinto Bravo	3; 6	1; 6	2; 6
2	(Peru) (Chile)	Alfredo Acuña; Patricio Cornejo	6; 8	3; 6	0; 6
3	(Peru) (Chile)	Alfredo Acuña / Tomás González; Patricio Cornejo / Jaime Pinto Bravo	6; 3	3; 6	3; 6	3; 6
4	(Peru) (Chile)	Alfredo Acuña; Jaime Pinto Bravo	4; 6	4; 6	5; 7
5	(Peru) (Chile)	Tomás González; Omar Pabst	8; 6	4; 6	6; 2	4; 6	3; 6

=== Final ===
==== Ecuador vs. Chile ====
Ecuador
3
Guayaquil Tennis Club, Guayaquil, Ecuador
24–27 May 1968
Clay

Chile
1

			1	2	3	4	5
1	(Ecuador) (Chile)	Miguel Olvera; Jaime Pinto Bravo	6; 3	9; 7	4; 6	4; 6	1; 6
2	(Ecuador) (Chile)	Pancho Guzmán; Patricio Cornejo	3; 6	5; 7	8; 6	6; 4	6; 3
3	(Ecuador) (Chile)	Pancho Guzmán / Miguel Olvera; Patricio Cornejo / Patricio Rodríguez	3; 6	7; 9	6; 3	11; 9	6; 1
4	(Ecuador) (Chile)	Miguel Olvera; Patricio Cornejo	5; 7	5; 7	12; 10	6; 2	7; 5
5	(Ecuador) (Chile)	Pancho Guzmán; Jaime Pinto Bravo						not played

== Americas Inter-Zonal Final ==
=== United States vs. Ecuador ===
United States
5
Charlotte Coliseum, Charlotte, NC, United States
7–9 June 1968
Carpet (indoor)

Ecuador
0

			1	2	3	4	5
1	(United States) (Ecuador)	Arthur Ashe; Pancho Guzmán	6; 3	6; 3	6; 2
2	(United States) (Ecuador)	Clark Graebner; Miguel Olvera	6; 2	6; 1	6; 2
3	(United States) (Ecuador)	Clark Graebner / Bob Lutz; Pancho Guzmán / Miguel Olvera	6; 3	6; 2	7; 5
4	(United States) (Ecuador)	Clark Graebner; Pancho Guzmán	4; 6	6; 3	6; 4	6; 4
5	(United States) (Ecuador)	Arthur Ashe; Miguel Olvera	6; 1	6; 3	6; 0
