= 1981 Egyptian Open =

Egyptian professional tennis tournament

- Date: 9–15 March
- Edition: 5th
- Category: Grand Prix
- Draw: 32S / 16D
- Prize money: $75,000
- Surface: Clay / outdoor
- Location: Cairo, Egypt

Champions

Singles
- (Argentina) Guillermo Vilas

Doubles
- (Egypt) Ismail El Shafei / (Hungary) Balázs Taróczy
← 1980 ·	Egyptian Open	· 1982 →

The 1981 Egyptian Open was a men's tennis tournament played on outdoor clay courts that was part of the 1981 Volvo Grand Prix circuit. It was the fifth edition of the tournament and was played in Cairo, Egypt from 9 March until 15 March 1981. First-seeded Guillermo Vilas won the singles title.

== Finals ==
=== Singles ===
(Argentina) Guillermo Vilas defeated (West Germany) Peter Elter 6–2, 6–3

- It was Vilas's 2nd singles title of the year and the 51st of his career.

=== Doubles ===
(Egypt) Ismail El Shafei / (Hungary) Balázs Taróczy defeated (Italy) Paolo Bertolucci / (Italy) Gianni Ocleppo 6–7, 6–3, 6–1
