= 1973 Torneo Godó – Doubles =

Doubles
- 1973 Torneo Godó

Final
- Champion: (Romania) Ilie Năstase (Netherlands) Tom Okker
- Runner-up: (Spain) Antonio Muñoz (Spain) Manuel Orantes
- Score: 4–6, 6–3, 6–2

Details
- Draw: 32
- Seeds: 4

Events
Singles	Doubles
← 1972 ·	Barcelona Open	· 1974 →

The 1973 Torneo Godó – Doubles was an event of the 1973 Torneo Godó tennis tournament and was played on outdoor clay courts at the Real Club de Tenis Barcelona in Barcelona, Spain between 8 October and 14 October 1973. Juan Gisbert and Manuel Orantes were the defending Torneo Godó doubles champions but did not compete together in this edition. Second-seeded Ilie Năstase and Tom Okker won the title by defeating fourth-seeded Antonio Muñoz and Manuel Orantes in the final, 4–6, 6–3, 6–2.

== Seeds ==
1. (France) Pierre Barthès / (Australia) Rod Laver (quarterfinals)
2. (Romania) Ilie Năstase / (Netherlands) Tom Okker (champions)
3. (Australia) Bob Carmichael / (South Africa) Frew McMillan (first round, withdrew)
4. (Spain) Antonio Muñoz / (Spain) Manuel Orantes (final)

== Draw ==
=== Key ===
- Q = Qualifier
- WC = Wild card
- LL = Lucky loser
- Alt = Alternate
- SE = Special exempt
- PR = Protected ranking
- ITF = ITF entry
- JE = Junior exempt
- w/o = Walkover
- r = Retired
- d = Defaulted
- SR = Special ranking

=== Finals ===
Semifinals
(Czechoslovakia) Jiří Hřebec (Chile) Jaime Pinto Bravo	6	7	4
4	(Spain) Antonio Muñoz (Spain) Manuel Orantes	3	6	6
(Czechoslovakia) Jan Kodeš (Czechoslovakia) Vladimír Zedník	3	2
2	(Romania) Ilie Năstase (Netherlands) Tom Okker	6	6

Final
4	(Spain) Antonio Muñoz (Spain) Manuel Orantes	6	3	2
2	(Romania) Ilie Năstase (Netherlands) Tom Okker	4	6	6

=== Top half ===
First Round
1	(France) Pierre Barthès (Australia) Rod Laver	6	6
(Spain) Alberto Martorell (Spain) Rafael Ruiz	4	3
(Italy) Corrado Barazzutti (Spain) Javier Soler	3	1
(Spain) José Higueras (Spain) Jose A. Moreno	6	6
(United Kingdom) Gerald Battrick (Zimbabwe) Andrew Pattison	w/o
(United States) James Parker (United States) Steve Stefanki
(Czechoslovakia) Jiří Hřebec (Chile) Jaime Pinto Bravo	6	6
(South Africa) Raymond Moore (New Zealand) Onny Parun	4	2
4	(Spain) Antonio Muñoz (Spain) Manuel Orantes	w/o
(Australia) Dick Crealy (France) Patrick Proisy
(France) Wanaro N'Godrella (France) Jacques Thamin
(Spain) Juan Herrera
(Egypt) Ismail El Shafei (Croatia) Nikola Pilić	6	6
(Sweden) Kjell Johansson (Sweden) Tenny Svensson	2	4
(United Kingdom) Mark Farrell (United Kingdom) Phil Siviter	6	7	1
(France) Jean-Baptiste Chanfreau (France) Georges Goven	1	9	6

Second Round
1	(France) Pierre Barthès (Australia) Rod Laver	6	6
(Spain) José Higueras (Spain) Jose A. Moreno	4	1
(United Kingdom) Gerald Battrick (Zimbabwe) Andrew Pattison	2	2
(Czechoslovakia) Jiří Hřebec (Chile) Jaime Pinto Bravo	6	6
4	(Spain) Antonio Muñoz (Spain) Manuel Orantes
(France) Wanaro N'Godrella (France) Jacques Thamin
(Egypt) Ismail El Shafei (Croatia) Nikola Pilić	6	7	3
(France) Jean-Baptiste Chanfreau (France) Georges Goven	3	9	6

Quarterfinals
1	(France) Pierre Barthès (Australia) Rod Laver	4	3
(Czechoslovakia) Jiří Hřebec (Chile) Jaime Pinto Bravo	6	6
4	(Spain) Antonio Muñoz (Spain) Manuel Orantes	6	6
(France) Jean-Baptiste Chanfreau (France) Georges Goven	3	4

Semifinals
(Czechoslovakia) Jiří Hřebec (Chile) Jaime Pinto Bravo	6	7	4
4	(Spain) Antonio Muñoz (Spain) Manuel Orantes	3	6	6

=== Bottom half ===
First Round
(Argentina) Julián Ganzábal (South Africa) Terry Ryan
(Pakistan) Haroon Rahim (Argentina) Guillermo Vilas
(Spain) Jose Guerrero (Spain) Juan Ignacio Muntañola	2	1
(Czechoslovakia) Jan Kodeš (Czechoslovakia) Vladimír Zedník	6	6
(Sweden) Björn Borg (Romania) Ion Țiriac	6	6
(Sweden) Jan Norbäck	2	1
(Sweden) Birger Andersson (Sweden) Dan Rastland	w/o
3	(Australia) Bob Carmichael (South Africa) Frew McMillan
(West Germany) Attila Korpás (Serbia) Nikola Špear	10	6
(West Germany) Harald Elschenbroich (Sweden) Jan Zabrodsky	8	4
(Australia) Alvin Gardiner (New Zealand) Russell Simpson	6	2	5
(Italy) Paolo Bertolucci (Italy) Adriano Panatta	2	6	7
(United States) Eddie Dibbs (Australia) Barry Phillips-Moore	7	6	6
(United Kingdom) Colin Dowdeswell (Spain) Felix Morey	9	1	2
(Greece) Nicolas Kelaidis (Australia) Ray Keldie	0	6	2
2	(Romania) Ilie Năstase (Netherlands) Tom Okker	6	3	6

Second Round
(Pakistan) Haroon Rahim (Argentina) Guillermo Vilas	4	3
(Czechoslovakia) Jan Kodeš (Czechoslovakia) Vladimír Zedník	6	6
(Sweden) Björn Borg (Romania) Ion Țiriac	6	6
(Sweden) Birger Andersson (Sweden) Dan Rastland	2	2
(West Germany) Attila Korpás (Serbia) Nikola Špear	1	5
(Italy) Paolo Bertolucci (Italy) Adriano Panatta	6	7
(United States) Eddie Dibbs (Australia) Barry Phillips-Moore	1	4
2	(Romania) Ilie Năstase (Netherlands) Tom Okker	6	6

Quarterfinals
(Czechoslovakia) Jan Kodeš (Czechoslovakia) Vladimír Zedník	2	6	6
(Sweden) Björn Borg (Romania) Ion Țiriac	6	3	4
(Italy) Paolo Bertolucci (Italy) Adriano Panatta	3	2
2	(Romania) Ilie Năstase (Netherlands) Tom Okker	6	6

Semifinals
(Czechoslovakia) Jan Kodeš (Czechoslovakia) Vladimír Zedník	3	2
2	(Romania) Ilie Năstase (Netherlands) Tom Okker	6	6
