= 1982 Egyptian Open =

Egyptian professional tennis tournament

- Date: 22–28 February
- Edition: 6th
- Category: Grand Prix
- Draw: 32S / 16D
- Prize money: $75,000
- Surface: Clay / outdoor
- Location: Cairo, Egypt

Champions

Singles
- (Australia) Brad Drewett

Doubles
- (United States) Jim Gurfein / (United States) Drew Gitlin
← 1981 ·	Egyptian Open	· 1983 →

The 1982 Egyptian Open was a men's tennis tournament played on outdoor clay courts that was part of the 1982 Volvo Grand Prix circuit. It was the sixth edition of the tournament and was played in Cairo, Egypt from 22 February until 28 February 1982. Useeded Brad Drewett won the singles title.

== Finals ==
=== Singles ===
(Australia) Brad Drewett defeated (Italy) Claudio Panatta 6–3, 6–3

- It was Drewett's first singles title of his career.

=== Doubles ===
(United States) Jim Gurfein / (United States) Drew Gitlin defeated (Switzerland) Heinz Günthardt / (Switzerland) Markus Günthardt 6–4, 7–5
