= Adam Helfant =

American sports executive and lawyer

President and Executive Chairman of Association of Tennis Professionals
- In office 2009–2011
- Preceded by: Etienne de Villiers

Personal details
- Born: c. 1964 (age 61–62) Brooklyn, New York, USA
- Education: MIT; Harvard Law School
- Occupation: Lawyer

Adam Helfant (born c. 1964, Brooklyn) is an American sports executive and lawyer. He is the former Association of Tennis Professionals (ATP) executive chairman and president who succeeded Etienne de Villiers in 2009. Helfant is an MIT and Harvard Law graduate. He spent 12 years with Nike as a senior executive and three years with the National Hockey League as an attorney.

== Career ==
Helfant left the ATP at the end of 2011. He denied that he asked for more money, insisting that he was offered a long-term contract when his initial three-year deal was expiring and that he turned the offer down for personal reasons. Helfant left the ATP with in a strong financial position. He had tried to increase the amount of rest the players got. In November 2011 Helfant stated that he had boosted the ATP's commercial revenue by 80% and that the company's reserves had increased by more than 1,400%.

In 2012, with Chris Bevilacqua, Helfant started a sports and media advisory company called Bevilacqua Helfant Ventures.

Helfant's niece Grace McDonnell was one of the victims of the Newtown Tragedy.
