= 1975 Cairo Open =

Tennis tournament

- Date: 3–7 March
- Edition: 1st
- Draw: 32S
- Surface: Clay
- Location: Cairo, Egypt

Champions

Singles
- (Spain) Manuel Orantes

Doubles
- (Spain) Manuel Orantes / (Spain) Antonio Muñoz
Cairo Open	· 1977 →

The 1975 Cairo Open was a men's tennis tournament played on outdoor clay courts that was independent, i.e. not part of the Grand Prix or WCT circuit. It was the inaugural edition of the tournament and played at Cairo in Egypt. The event was held from 3 March through 9 March 1975 and Manuel Orantes won the singles title.

== Finals ==
=== Singles ===
(Spain) Manuel Orantes defeated (France) Francois Jauffret 6–0, 4–6, 6–1, 6–3

=== Doubles ===
(Spain) Manuel Orantes / (Spain) Antonio Muñoz defeated (Chile) Jaime Pinto-Bravo / (Chile) Belus Prajoux 3–6, 6–3, 6–4, 7–5
