= 1978 Egyptian Open =

1970s African professional tennis tournament

- Date: 6–12 March
- Edition: 3rd
- Category: Grand Prix
- Draw: 16S / 8D
- Prize money: $38,000
- Surface: Clay / outdoor
- Location: Cairo, Egypt

Champions

Singles
- (Spain) José Higueras

Doubles
- (Egypt) Ismail El Shafei / (Australia) Brian Fairlie
← 1977 ·	Egyptian Open	· 1979 →

The 1978 Egyptian Open was a men's tennis tournament played on outdoor clay courts that was part of the 1978 Colgate-Palmolive Grand Prix . It was played at Cairo in Egypt and was held from 6 March until 12 March 1978. First-seeded José Higueras won the singles title.

== Finals ==
=== Singles ===
(Spain) José Higueras defeated (Sweden) Kjell Johansson 4–6, 6–4, 6–4

- It was Higueras' 1st singles title of the year and the 3rd of his career.

=== Doubles ===
(Egypt) Ismail El Shafei / (Australia) Brian Fairlie defeated (Argentina) Lito Álvarez / (United States) George Hardie 6–3, 7–5, 6–2
