= 1974 Torneo Godó =

- Date: 14 – 20 October
- Edition: 22nd
- Category: Grand Prix circuit (Group A)
- Draw: 64S / 32D
- Prize money: $75,000
- Surface: Clay / outdoor
- Location: Barcelona, Spain
- Venue: Real Club de Tenis Barcelona

Champions

Singles
- (Romania) Ilie Năstase

Doubles
- (Spain) Juan Gisbert / (Romania) Ilie Năstase
← 1973 ·	Torneo Godó	· 1975 →

The 1974 Torneo Godó or Trofeo Conde de Godó was a men's tennis tournament that took place on outdoor clay courts at the Real Club de Tenis Barcelona in Barcelona, Spain. It was the 22nd edition of the tournament and was part of the 1974 Grand Prix circuit. It was held from 14 October through 20 October 1974. Fourth-seeded Ilie Năstase won his second consecutive singles title at the event.

== Finals ==
=== Singles ===
(Romania) Ilie Năstase defeated (Spain) Manuel Orantes 8–6, 9–7, 6–3

- It was Năstase's 6th singles title of the year and the 42nd of his career.

=== Doubles ===
(Spain) Juan Gisbert / (Romania) Ilie Năstase defeated (Spain) Manuel Orantes / (Argentina) Guillermo Vilas 3–6, 6–0, 6–2

== See also ==
- 1974 Barcelona WCT
