= Brad Drewett =

Australian tennis player (1958-2013)

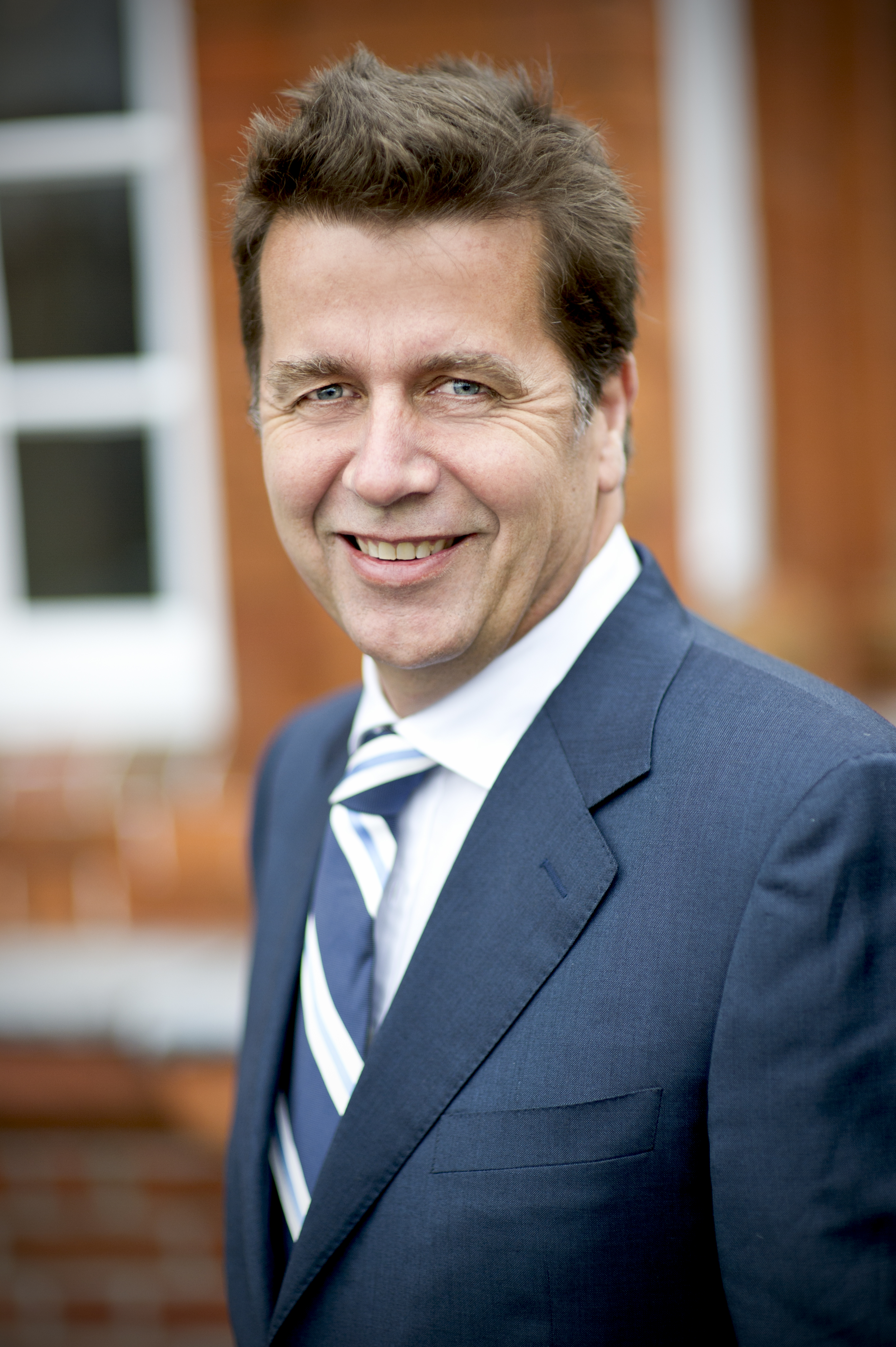
- Country (sports): Australia
- Born: 19 July 1958 Maclean, New South Wales, Australia
- Died: 3 May 2013 (aged 54) Sydney, New South Wales, Australia
- Height: 185 cm (6 ft 1 in)
- Turned pro: 1977
- Retired: 1990
- Plays: Left-handed
- Prize money: $755,546

Singles
- Career record: 181–226
- Career titles: 2
- Highest ranking: No. 34 (26 March 1984)

Grand Slam singles results
- Australian Open: QF (1976)
- French Open: 1R (1984)
- Wimbledon: 4R (1979)
- US Open: 3R (1984)

Doubles
- Career record: 220–250
- Career titles: 7
- Highest ranking: No. 18 (21 November 1988)

Grand Slam doubles results
- Australian Open: SF (1988, 1989)
- French Open: 3R (1984, 1988)
- Wimbledon: QF (1986)
- US Open: 2R (1980, 1981, 1982, 1984, 1989)

Grand Slam mixed doubles results
- Australian Open: QF (1988)

Brad Drewett (19 July 1958 – 3 May 2013) was an Australian tennis player and ATP official. He was the 1975 and 1977 Australian Open junior champion and the youngest player at age 17 to win the title since Ken Rosewall and John Newcombe. He was also the third-youngest Australian Open quarterfinalist in his first Grand Slam appearance, at 17 years 5 months in 1975, behind Boris Becker, 17 years 4 days in 1984 and Goran Ivanišević, 17 years 4 months in 1989.

Drewett won two career singles titles, reached the quarterfinals of the 1976 Australian Open and attained a career-high singles ranking of world No. 34 in March 1984. In doubles, he won seven titles and reached as high as world No. 18 in November 1988.

== Tennis career ==
=== Juniors ===
Drewett won the Australian Open boys' singles title in 1975 and 1977 (in January).

=== Pro tour ===
During his professional career, Drewett won two singles titles (Cairo 1982 and South Orange 1983) and seven doubles titles and reached the quarterfinals of the Australian Open singles in 1976. He was a finalist on four other occasions: Adelaide 1981, Cleveland 1985, Newport 1988 and Seoul 1989. He also achieved a career-high doubles ranking of world No. 18, reaching the semifinals in doubles (partnering Martin Davis) at the Australian Open in 1988 and 1989. Brad was also a member of the Australia Davis Cup team in 1981 and 1985. He broke the top 50 for the first time in 1984.

=== Post-retirement ===
After his retirement as a professional tennis player, he worked as a commentator for Channel 9 and Channel 10 in Australia. Drewett began serving as Association of Tennis Professionals (ATP) Executive chairman and President on 1 January 2012. He was appointed for three years, replacing Adam Helfant. Drewett had previously served as the ATP's chief executive officer for the International Group since January 2006 and oversaw the ATP's operations in the Middle East, Asia and Pacific regions. Prior to that, he led the region as managing director from 2003 to 2005 and was executive vice-president from 1999 to 2003. He has previously served as an elected ATP Player Council representative and from 1993 until 1999, as an elected ATP Player Board Representative. Since 2001, Drewett has been the tournament director of the ATP World Tour's season-ending event, the Barclays ATP World Tour Finals. As well as overseeing the event when held in Sydney and Houston, Drewett negotiated a multi-year deal with the Shanghai Administration of Sport and Shanghai Ba-shi Industrial Company to stage the Tennis Masters Cup in Shanghai from 2005 to 2008.

=== Illness and death ===
On 14 January 2013, Drewett announced he would enter a transitional period as ATP Executive Chairman and President because of illness, after he was diagnosed with motor neuron disease (also known as ALS or Lou Gehrig's disease), writing: "It has been a privilege to serve as Executive Chairman and President of the ATP, an organization that I’ve been a part of for more than 35 years since I became a professional tennis player. I hold the ATP very close to my heart, and it’s with sadness that I make the decision to enter this transition period due to my ill-health". He died at home in Sydney on 3 May 2013.

In memory of his contribution to the development of world tennis and particularly tournaments in China, Show Court 1 at the National Tennis Center in Beijing was officially renamed the Brad Drewett Court ahead of the 2013 China Open final. In recognition of his influence on the ATP World Tour Finals, in 2013 the ATP World Tour Finals trophy was renamed The Brad Drewett Trophy. There is also a memorial brass bust of Drewett at The Australian Open, Melbourne Park, reading 'A top-40 player, Australian Davis Cup representative, ATP Executive Chairman and President, Brad left an indelible mark on the sport he loved, ensuring our great game was in a better place than he found it.'.
