= Etienne de Villiers =

South African executive (born 1949)

- Born: Etienne Marquard de Villiers; August 1949 (age 77); Pretoria, South Africa
- Education: Pretoria Boys High School; University of Pretoria, BSc civil engineering; Trinity College, Oxford (Rhodes scholar) MA Oxon (philosophy, politics and economics)
- Occupations: Chairman, DataEQ; former chief executive of sports and media businesses; investor
- Known for: ATP, Disney, BBC Worldwide
- Board member of: DataEQ; Former board member of: BBC Commercial Holdings Board; Englefield Capital; ITV plc; Video networks; SLEC; Jetix

Etienne Marquard de Villiers (born August 1949) is a South African investor and executive in global media and sports businesses. He is chairman of DataEQ, a leading South African opinion mining company.

His former roles include executive chairman of the ATP Tour, president at Walt Disney Television International, chairman of BBC Worldwide, chairman of Virgin Racing F1 team, board member of Kirch/SLEC and ITV, director of Saracens rugby club and CEO of Satbel.

== Early life and career ==
De Villiers was born and raised in Pretoria, South Africa, the son of South African cardiologist Marquard De Villiers. He has three sisters and a brother; record producer Paul, is responsible for the triple platinum Mr. Mister album Welcome to the Real World.

After graduating with a civil engineering degree from the University of Pretoria, DeVilliers received a Rhodes scholarship and read PPE at Oxford University. Following stints in engineering roles, in 1979 he joined management consultancy firm McKinsey & Company, where he was influenced by colleagues Tom Peters and Robert Waterman, authors of In Search of Excellence.

In 1984 De Villiers was hired by Sol Kerzner to become CEO of Satbel, the South African entertainment conglomerate and operator of South Africa's largest cinema chain, Ster-Kinekor.

== Satbel and racial de-segregation in South Africa ==
As CEO of Satbel, De Villiers was instrumental in ending racial segregation in South African cinema theatres. Describing his dealings with former South African president F. W. De Klerk, the then-Minister of Internal Affairs, de Villiers said: "We bluffed each other that it would be catastrophic if we didn't do the right thing. De Klerk bluffed the government and I bluffed the entertainment industry and together we managed to pull it off."

== Indian Premier League ==
In 2009 De Villiers was asked by his former business partner Lalit Modi to assume ultimate responsibility for promoting the 2009 Indian Premier League in its last-minute switch to South Africa. The IPL was moved less than a month before opening ceremonies were due to begin, following terrorist attacks in India. At the time Modi was quoted as saying: "It's taken South Africa eight years to get ready for the 2010 soccer World Cup. We've had 29 days". Moving host nations is reported to have required the short-notice booking of 59 matches in 8 South African stadia, as well as 10,000 air tickets and 30,000 hotel rooms.

De Villiers asked François Pienaar to lend his support. The endorsement of the talismanic South African 1995 Rugby World Cup captain is credited with sparking interest in the IPL among South African fans, many of whom had never heard of the visiting Indian city-teams. The Times of India reported that the South African IPL tour did much to boost racial integration and presented South Africa as the perfect sporting destination. Citing the IPL's positive reviews, the Times called the South African tour "a successful experiment in atypical globalization ... where the West has to look to the East".

== Tenure at the ATP ==
In September 2005 De Villiers was appointed chairman of the Association of Tennis Professionals (ATP), the governing body of the men's professional tennis circuit. De Villiers was given a brief to modernise men's tennis, a sport that many commentators believed to have grown stagnant and balkanized.

While some in the sport took against his reforms, De Villiers' tenure is now viewed more favourably. De Villiers is credited by the Financial Times newspaper with making the sport easier to follow and more entertaining for fans, doubling prize money for players and attracting $1bn of new investment.

De Villiers was behind the decision to host the ATP World Tour Finals at the O2 Arena. With its more dramatic and theatrical presentation, the O2 event was marketed as a clean break from traditional UK tennis, although both the All England Club and the Lawn Tennis Association helped to publicise it. The inaugural event overcame initial scepticism to register a total attendance of more than 250,000; the venue hosted all ATP World tour finals until moving to Turin in 2021.

De Villiers fulfilled his three-year contract with the ATP in December 2008.

=== Controversies ===
De Villiers' reform of the ATP essentially involved players giving up a degree of autonomy in return for higher potential earnings, and persuading promoters and agents to endorse a more TV-friendly tournament format, sometime at the expense of individual interest groups within the sport.

Some of De Villiers' decisions were publicly contested by players and promoters, notably Roger Federer and Rafael Nadal. Inside Tennis magazine reported the position between De Villiers and players thus:

The problem for de Villiers is the ATP is a union of multi-millionaire 19-25-year-old kids and they don't want to take orders from a former Disney executive.

In March 2008, 20 ATP players signed a letter to the ATP Board of Directors to the effect that De Villiers' contract should not be renewed until other candidates were interviewed for the position. Other players were more approving. In a 2007 Inside Tennis interview, doubles player Mike Bryan said of De Villiers: "[he] might make a couple of bad calls, but in general the guy's a genius".

The ATP experienced external controversies during De Villiers tenure, most notably an antitrust lawsuit brought by the German Tennis Federation. The lawsuit challenged the ATP's right to downgrade Hamburg's status on the Masters Series, a decision that also reduced the earnings of some clay-court players. Hamburg's case was unanimously rejected by the US jury, but legal victory came at a considerable financial expense to the ATP.

Separately, in 2007 several players reported being approached by illegal gambling rings offering money to fix matches. The ATP's subsequent investigation found some players had gambled in contravention of the ATP's rules. Although none had bet on their own matches, five players were fined and suspended. The much-publicised Davydenko-Argüello match in Sopot, where Betfair suspended betting after a series of highly unusual bets, prompted a rethink in the sport. De Villiers initiated an independent review to investigate whether corruption was systemic within the game. The report called for the establishment of a tennis-wide anti corruption unit, a recommendation that led to the Tennis Integrity Unit, a joint initiative by the ATP, ITF, WTA and the Grand Slam committee. In a 2007 interview with the New York Times, De Villiers said: "We can't possibly stop our athletes being approached [by illegal gambling rings]. We can't have all of our 700 or 800 athletes with bodyguards, but what we can do is educate them on their responsibilities when they are approached and the consequences of not behaving appropriately."

A New York Times profile of De Villiers and ATP described him as "quotable and irreverent".

== BBC Worldwide ==
De Villiers was chairman of the BBC's commercial holdings board, including BBC Worldwide, from 2005 to 2009. In de Villiers' last year as chairman the organisation announced revenues exceeding £1 billion for 2008/2009. In 2007/08, BBC Worldwide reported profits of £120m, up three-fold on 2004/05, with much of the increase coming from international expansion and new businesses.

== Disney ==
In 1986 de Villiers joined the Walt Disney company, where he managed Disney's television activities worldwide. He went on to become head of Disney in Europe, including its theme parks, stores and home entertainment, with the international TV business growing from $15m to $1bn during his tenure, and from six employees to 700.

== Virgin Racing ==
In October 2009 de Villiers was appointed chairman of the Virgin Racing F1 team. He resigned upon the team's sale to Marussia in December 2011.

== Private equity ==
De Villiers cofounded private equity vehicle Englefield Capital, whose main investor was the Dutch Brenninkmeijer family. Englefield raised its debut fund of €730m in May 2003.

De Villiers is a former non-exec director of Pi Capital, an investment network for high-net-worth business leaders.

== DataEQ ==
De Villiers is the current chairman of DataEQ, an opinion-mining technology firm. He is also an investor in the firm. DataEQ uses AI algorithms and crowd-sourcing to assess public opinion expressed online. It accurately predicted the results of the 2016 Brexit vote and Donald Trump's 2016 Presidential election victory.

== Personal life ==
De Villiers is a former director of Marie Curie Cancer Care and the National Film and Television School Foundation.

He is married to his childhood sweetheart.
