= Egyptian Open (tennis) =

Defunct tennis tournament
- Event name: Egyptian Championships (1925–69); Egyptian Open (1970–91); Cairo Challenger (1992–2002)
- Tour: Grand Prix circuit (1975–82); Challenger circuit (1983–91)
- Founded: 1925
- Abolished: 2002
- Editions: 66
- Location: Cairo, Egypt
- Venue: Gezira Sporting Club
- Surface: Clay (1925–2002)

The Egyptian Open originally known as the Egyptian Championships also known as the Egyptian Open Championships or International Championships of Egypt is a defunct Grand Prix and Challenger affiliated tennis tournament played from 1975 to 1991. It was held in Cairo in Egypt and played on outdoor clay courts from 1925 to 2002.

Roderich Menzel was the most successful player in singles play winning five times. Ismail El Shafei was the most successful player at the tournament, winning singles titles three times and the doubles competition three times with three different partners; once with New Zealander Brian Fairlie, once with Dutchman Tom Okker and once with Hungarian Balázs Taróczy.

== History ==
The Egyptian Championships or International Championships of Egypt its original name was first staged in Cairo on 2 March 1925 the event was staged 66 times, However Egyptian newspaper sources have given the start date as 1922. The tournament was a regular feature on the pre-open era men's tour from inception until 1967, from 1968 until 1974 it was part of an independent men's tour for tournaments not-aligned to any particular circuit. In 1970 the tournament changed its name to the Egyptian Open. In 1975 he joined the Grand Prix tennis circuit through till 1982. From 1983 until 2002 it was part of the ATP Challenger series. The tournament was hosted annually at the Gezira Sporting Club.

For the years 1937, 1939 it was co-valid as the Cairo Championships, for 1960 1968 1969 it was co-valid as Cairo International Championships, In 1972, 1975, 1976 and 1977 this tournament was co-valid as the Cairo Open. That tournament was played at the Gezira Club after world war two.

== Past finals ==
Past champions have included:

=== Singles ===
Year	Champions	Runners-up	Score
1925	(Greece) Augustos Zerlendis	?	?
1926	(Greece) Augustos Zerlendis (2)	?	?
1927	(Republic of Ireland) Cecil Campbell	?	?
1928	(Egypt) Jacques Grandguillot	?	?
1929	(Greece) Augustos Zerlendis (3)	?	?
1930	(Belgium) Maurice d'Eeckhoutte	?	?
1931	(Greece) Orestis Garangiotιs	(Republic of Ireland) Cecil Campbell	6–2, 3–6, 7–5
1932	(Italy) Giorgio de Stefani	(Italy) Placido Gaslini	8–6, 6–3
1933	(Czechoslovakia) Roderich Menzel	(Greece) Augustos Zerlendis	6–1, 6–1
1934	(Czechoslovakia) Roderich Menzel (2)	(United Kingdom) Pat Hughes	6–3, 6–4
1935	(Germany) Roderich Menzel (3)	(Austria) Hermann von Artens	6–4, 6–0, 6–0
1937	(Germany) Henner Henkel	(Italy) Giorgio de Stefani	7–5, 6–0
1938	(Germany) Roderich Menzel(4)	(Germany) Henner Henkel	6–1, 6–2, 6–4
1939	(Germany) Gottfried von Cramm	(United States) Don McNeill	7–5, 6–2, 6–8, 6–2
1940–45	Not held WW2		
1946	(France) Henri Cochet	(France) Robert Abdesselam	6–3, 6–1, 6–3
1947	(France) Henri Cochet (2)	(France) Robert Abdesselam	6–3, 6–1, 6–3
1948	(Socialist Federal Republic of Yugoslavia) Franjo Punčec	(Belgium) Jacques Peten	6–2, 6–3, 6–4
1949	(United States) Frank Parker	(United States) Budge Patty	6–2, 9–7, 8–6
1950	(Egypt) Jaroslav Drobný	(West Germany) Gottfried von Cramm	8–6, 6–2, 6–3
1951	(Egypt) Jaroslav Drobný (2)	(Philippines) Felicisimo Ampon	6–3, 6–4, 6–0
1952	(Egypt) Jaroslav Drobný (3)	(Poland) Władysław Skonecki	6–3, 6–0, 6–3
1953	(Egypt) Jaroslav Drobný (4)	(West Germany) Gottfried von Cramm	6–4, 6–1, 6–1
1954	(Argentina) Enrique Morea	(Egypt) Jaroslav Drobný	6–3, 1–6, 6–1, 6–4
1955	(Italy) Fausto Gardini	(United States) Fred Kovaleski	6–4, 6–2, 1–6, 4–6, 11–9
1956	(Australia) Lew Hoad	(Sweden) Sven Davidson	1–6, 6–3, 4–6, 6–2, 6–4
1957	(Sweden) Sven Davidson	(Belgium) Philippe Washer	6–2, 2–6, 6–1, 6–2
1958	(Italy) Nicola Pietrangeli	(Italy) Giuseppe Merlo	2–6, 6–2, 6–2, 6–4
1959	(Italy) Nicola Pietrangeli (2)	(Italy) Giuseppe Merlo	6–2, 6–3, 6–1
1960	(Italy) Nicola Pietrangeli (3)	(Italy) Giuseppe Merlo	5–7, 6–2, 6–3, 6–3
1961	(Italy) Nicola Pietrangeli (4)	(Australia) Neil Gibson	6–3, 9–7, 6–3
1962	(Australia) Fred Stolle	(Romania) Ion Țiriac	5–7, 6–1, 6–1, 4–6, 6–3
1963	(Spain) José Luis Arilla	(Italy) Nicola Pietrangeli	6–4, 6–4, 6–3
1964	(France) Pierre Barthès	(Hungary) István Gulyás	6–4, 1–6, 3–6, 6–4, 6–4
1965	(Australia) Ken Fletcher	(Poland) Wieslaw Gasiorek	3–6, 6–3, 3–6, 6–1, 6–3
1966	(Sweden) Jan-Erik Lundqvist	(Australia) Ken Fletcher	6–3, 6–3, 6–2
1967	(Sweden) Jan-Erik Lundqvist (2)	(Egypt) Ismail El Shafei	6–4, 6–4, 6–2
1968	(Czechoslovakia) Milan Holeček	(Egypt) Ismail El Shafei	4–6, 6–3, 6–1, 6–2
1969	(Egypt) Ismail El Shafei	(Hungary) István Gulyás	6–4, 7–9, 6–4, 6–4
1970	(Spain) Manuel Santana	(Soviet Union) Alexander Metreveli	7–5, 6–2, 6–4
1971	(Soviet Union) Alexander Metreveli	(Egypt) Ismail El Shafei	8–6, 9–7, 6–4
1972	(Soviet Union) Alexander Metreveli (2)	(Czechoslovakia) František Pála	6–3, 6–2, 6–3
1973	(Egypt) Ismail El Shafei (2)	(France) Patrick Proisy	6–4, 6–8, 6–3, 6–3
1974	(Egypt) Ismail El Shafei (3)	(France) François Jauffret	6–2, 2–6, 6–2, 6–4
1975	(Spain) Manuel Orantes	(France) François Jauffret	6–0, 4–6, 6–1, 6–3
1976	Not held		
1977	(France) François Jauffret	(West Germany) Frank Gebert	6–3, 7–5, 6–4
1978	(Spain) José Higueras	(Sweden) Kjell Johansson	4–6, 6–4, 6–4
1979	(Austria) Peter Feigl	(Brazil) Carlos Kirmayr	7–5, 3–6, 6–1
1980	(Italy) Corrado Barazzutti	(Italy) Paolo Bertolucci	6–4, 6–0
1981	(Argentina) Guillermo Vilas	(West Germany) Peter Elter	6–2, 6–3
1982	(Australia) Brad Drewett	(Italy) Claudio Panatta	6–3, 6–3
1983	(Sweden) Henrik Sundström	(Spain) Juan Avendaño	6–7, 6–2, 6–0
1984	(Spain) Fernando Luna	(United States) Mark Dickson	6–4, 6–2
1985	(Spain) Fernando Luna (2)	(Australia) Trevor Allan	6–3, 6–4
1986	Not completed		
1987	(Spain) Alberto Tous	(Spain) David de Miguel	6–2, 6–3
1988	(Spain) Jordi Arrese	(Peru) Carlos di Laura	7–6, 6–2
1989	(Spain) Sergi Bruguera	(Spain) Jordi Arrese	6–7, 6–4, 6–4
1990	(Austria) Thomas Muster	(Spain) José Francisco Altur	6–4, 6–3
1991	(United States) Bryan Shelton	(Netherlands) Jacco Eltingh	7–6, 7–6
1992–95	Not held		
1996	(Brazil) Fernando Meligeni	(Spain) Alberto Berasategui	3–6, 6–1, 6–2
1997	(Spain) Alberto Berasategui	(Morocco) Karim Alami	7–5, 6–3
1998	(Spain) Albert Portas	(Spain) Alberto Martín	6–2, 1–6, 6–3
1999	(Morocco) Karim Alami	(Belgium) Christophe Rochus	6–3, 6–1
2000	(Spain) Albert Portas (2)	(Czech Republic) Jiří Vaněk	7–5, 6–3
2001	Not held		
2002	(Italy) Stefano Galvani	(Spain) Albert Portas	2–6, 7–6, 6–1

=== Doubles ===
Year	Champions	Runners-up	Score
1975	(Spain) Antonio Muñoz (Spain) Manuel Orantes	(Chile) Jaime Pinto Bravo (Chile) Belus Prajoux	3–6, 6–3, 6–4, 7–5
1976	Not held		
1977	(United States) Bill Bartlett (Australia) John Marks	(United States) Pat DuPré (United Kingdom) Chris Lewis	7–5, 6–1, 6–3
1978	(Egypt) Ismail El Shafei (New Zealand) Brian Fairlie	(Argentina) Lito Álvarez (United States) George Hardie	6–3, 7–5, 6–2
1979	(Australia) Peter McNamara (Australia) Paul McNamee	(India) Anand Amritraj (India) Vijay Amritraj	7–5, 6–4
1980	(Egypt) Ismail El Shafei (Netherlands) Tom Okker	(France) Christophe Freyss (France) Bernard Fritz	6–3, 3–6, 6–3
1981	(Egypt) Ismail El Shafei (Hungary) Balázs Taróczy	(Italy) Paolo Bertolucci (Italy) Gianni Ocleppo	6–7, 6–3, 6–1
1982	(United States) Drew Gitlin (United States) Jim Gurfein	(Switzerland) Heinz Günthardt (Switzerland) Markus Günthardt	6–4, 7–5
1983	(Australia) Broderick Dyke (Australia) Rod Frawley	(Australia) Brad Drewett (United Kingdom) John Feaver	6–3, 6–2
1984	(United States) Brett Dickinson (United States) Drew Gitlin	(United States) Marcel Freeman (United States) Tim Wilkison	7–6, 6–3
1985	(India) Anand Amritraj (United States) Lloyd Bourne	(Australia) Trevor Allan (Spain) Alberto Tous	6–4, 2–6, 7–5
1986	Not held		
1987	(France) Loïc Courteau (West Germany) Tore Meinecke	(Spain) Jordi Arrese (Spain) David de Miguel	2–6, 7–6, 6–4
1988	(Czechoslovakia) Josef Čihák (Czechoslovakia) Cyril Suk	(Argentina) Roberto Argüello (Argentina) Marcelo Ingaramo	6–3, 6–2
1989	(Spain) Jordi Arrese (Spain) Tomás Carbonell	(Spain) Carlos Costa (Spain) Francisco Roig	7–6, 6–3
1990	(Czechoslovakia) Tomáš Anzari (Czechoslovakia) David Rikl	(Belgium) Eduardo Masso (Argentina) Christian Miniussi	6–3, 6–7, 7–5
1991	(Czechoslovakia) Martin Damm (Czechoslovakia) David Rikl	(Zimbabwe) Byron Black (South Africa) Marcos Ondruska	6–2, 6–3

== See also ==
- International Championships of Egypt (Alexandria)
- Category:National and multi-national tennis tournaments

== Sources ==
- www.tennisbase.com/Egyptian Championships (currently Egyptian Open) Roll of Honor
