= 1968 Davis Cup =

1968 edition of the Davis Cup

Details
- Duration: 20 March – 28 December 1968
- Edition: 57th
- Teams: 49

Champion
- Winning nation: United States

The 1968 Davis Cup was the 57th edition of the Davis Cup, the most important tournament between national teams in men's tennis. 32 teams entered the Europe Zone, 9 teams entered the Americas Zone, and 8 teams entered the Eastern Zone. Peru made its first appearance in the tournament, having previously entered on 3 occasions before subsequently withdrawing before competing in a tie.

The United States defeated Ecuador in the Americas Inter-Zonal final, India defeated Japan in the Eastern Inter-Zonal final, and Spain and West Germany were the winners of the two Europe Zones, defeating Italy and South Africa respectively.

In the Inter-Zonal Zone, the United States defeated Spain and India defeated West Germany in the semifinals, and then the United States defeated India in the final. The United States then defeated the defending champions Australia in the Challenge Round, ending Australia's four-year title run. The final was played at Memorial Drive Park in Adelaide, Australia on 26–28 December.

== Incidents ==
In what became known as the Båstad riots, the Europe Zone first-round tie between Sweden and Rhodesia, planned to be held in Båstad, Sweden, caused widespread disruption as demonstrators protested the participation of both Rhodesia and South Africa in the tournament. Both countries had been banned from competing in other sports competitions due to their apartheid and white minority rule policies.

Following discussions between the Swedish government and demonstrators, the International Tennis Federation and Swedish Tennis Federation decided to move the tie to a neutral location in Bandol, France.

== Americas Zone ==
=== North & Central America Zone ===
Semifinals; 3–13 May
Richmond, VA, United States (hard)
United States	5
Caribbean/West Indies	0
Mexico City, Mexico (clay)
Canada	0
Mexico	5

Final; 24–26 May
Berkeley, CA, United States (hard)
United States	5
Mexico	0

=== South America Zone ===
Quarterfinals; 27–29 April
Caracas, Venezuela
Venezuela	3
Argentina	2
Ecuador
bye
bye
Peru
bye
Chile

Semifinals; 29–31 March; 11–13 May
Caracas, Venezuela (hard)
Venezuela	0
Ecuador	3
Lima, Peru
Peru	0
Chile	5

Final; 24–27 May
Guayaquil, Ecuador (clay)
Ecuador	3
Chile	1

=== Americas Inter-Zonal Final ===
United States vs. Ecuador

United States
5
Charlotte Coliseum, Charlotte, NC, United States
7–9 June 1968
Carpet (indoor)

Ecuador
0

			1	2	3	4	5
1	(United States) (Ecuador)	Arthur Ashe; Pancho Guzmán	6; 3	6; 3	6; 2
2	(United States) (Ecuador)	Clark Graebner; Miguel Olvera	6; 2	6; 1	6; 2
3	(United States) (Ecuador)	Clark Graebner / Bob Lutz; Pancho Guzmán / Miguel Olvera	6; 3	6; 2	7; 5
4	(United States) (Ecuador)	Clark Graebner; Pancho Guzmán	4; 6	6; 3	6; 4	6; 4
5	(United States) (Ecuador)	Arthur Ashe; Miguel Olvera	6; 1	6; 3	6; 0

== Eastern Zone ==
=== Zone A ===
Quarterfinals
Indonesia	w/o
South Vietnam
Philippines
bye
bye
South Korea
bye
Japan

Semifinals; 23–25 March; 26–28 April
Manila, Philippines
Indonesia	1
Philippines	4
Tokyo, Japan
South Korea	0
Japan	5

Final; 10–12 May
Tokyo, Japan
Philippines	1
Japan	4

=== Zone B ===
Semifinals; 20–22 March
Colombo, Ceylon (clay)
Malaysia	1
Ceylon	4
bye
India

Final; 26–28 April
Guwahati, India
Ceylon	2
India	3

=== Eastern Inter-Zonal Final ===
Japan vs. India

Japan
1
Tokyo, Japan
21–23 September 1968

India
4

			1	2	3	4	5
1	(Japan) (India)	Keishiro Yanagi; Premjit Lall	2; 6	4; 6	3; 6
2	(Japan) (India)	Koji Watanabe; Ramanathan Krishnan	2; 6	6; 3	3; 6	2; 6
3	(Japan) (India)	Isao Watanabe / Koji Watanabe; Ramanathan Krishnan / Jaidip Mukerjea	2; 6	2; 6	7; 5	6; 1	0; 6
4	(Japan) (India)	Keishiro Yanagi; Ramanathan Krishnan	4; 6	3; 6	1; 6
5	(Japan) (India)	Koji Watanabe; Premjit Lall	8; 6	6; 1	6; 2

== Europe Zone ==
=== Zone A ===
First Round; 26 April–7 May
Valencia, Spain (clay)
Spain	3
Netherlands	2
Bandol, France (hard)
Sweden	4
Rhodesia	1
Bournemouth, England (clay)
Great Britain	3
France	0
Helsinki, Finland (clay)
Finland	4
Portugal	1
Tbilisi, Soviet Union
Soviet Union	4
Greece	1
Zagreb, Yugoslavia
Yugoslavia	4
New Zealand	0
Cagliari, Italy (clay)
Italy	5
Hungary	0
Monte Carlo, Monaco
Monaco	3
Ireland	1

Quarterfinals; 23–26 May
Barcelona, Spain (clay)
Spain	4
Sweden	1
London, England (grass)
Great Britain	5
Finland	0
Moscow, Soviet Union
Soviet Union	5
Yugoslavia	0
Biella, Italy (clay)
Italy	5
Monaco	0

Semifinals; 13–16 June
Barcelona, Spain (clay)
Spain	4
Great Britain	1
Reggio Emilia, Italy (clay)
Soviet Union	2
Italy	3

Final; 19–21 July
Barcelona, Spain (clay)
Spain	3
Italy	2

==== Zone A Final ====
Spain vs. Italy

Spain
3
Real Club de Tenis, Barcelona, Spain
19–21 July 1968
Clay

Italy
2

			1	2	3	4	5
1	(Spain) (Italy)	Juan Gisbert; Martin Mulligan	6; 4	2; 6	6; 2	6; 4
2	(Spain) (Italy)	Manuel Santana; Nicola Pietrangeli	6; 3	3; 6	4; 6	6; 4	6; 2
3	(Spain) (Italy)	José Luis Arilla / Manuel Orantes; Martin Mulligan / Nicola Pietrangeli	5; 7	2; 6	6; 3	3; 6
4	(Spain) (Italy)	Juan Gisbert; Nicola Pietrangeli	8; 6	6; 4	6; 2
5	(Spain) (Italy)	Manuel Orantes; Martin Mulligan	6; 4	6; 4	5; 7	3; 6	4; 4

=== Zone B ===
First Round; 28 April–6 May
Sofia, Bulgaria
Bulgaria	5
Turkey	0
Freiburg, West Germany
Switzerland	1
West Germany	4
Brussels, Belgium
Belgium	3
Poland	2
Prague, Czechoslovakia (clay)
Czechoslovakia	3
Brazil	2
Luxembourg, Luxembourg (clay)
Luxembourg	1
Norway	4
Bucharest, Romania (clay)
Romania	4
Denmark	1
Tehran, Iran
Iran	4
Israel	1
Linz, Austria
Austria	0
South Africa	5

Quarterfinals; 17–26 May
Sofia, Bulgaria
Bulgaria	0
West Germany	5
Brussels, Belgium (clay)
Belgium	2
Czechoslovakia	3
Oslo, Norway (clay)
Norway	0
Romania	5
Tehran, Iran
Iran	0
South Africa	5

Semifinals; 14–16 June
Munich, West Germany (clay)
West Germany	4
Czechoslovakia	1
Romania
South Africa	w/o

Final; 19–21 July
Düsseldorf, West Germany
West Germany	3
South Africa	2

==== Zone B Final ====
West Germany vs. South Africa

West Germany
3
Düsseldorf, West Germany
19–21 July 1968

South Africa
2

			1	2	3	4	5
1	(West Germany) (South Africa)	Wilhelm Bungert; Bob Hewitt	9; 7	7; 5	7; 5
2	(West Germany) (South Africa)	Ingo Buding; Ray Moore	6; 3	4; 6	10; 8	6; 8	6; 4
3	(West Germany) (South Africa)	Ingo Buding / Jürgen Fassbender; Bob Hewitt / Frew McMillan	4; 6	2; 6	4; 6
4	(West Germany) (South Africa)	Wilhelm Bungert; Ray Moore	6; 1	6; 1	6; 1
5	(West Germany) (South Africa)	Ingo Buding; Bob Hewitt	5; 7	2; 6	6; 2	3; 6

== Inter-Zonal Zone ==
=== Draw ===
Semifinals; 14–16 August; 4–6 October
Munich, West Germany
EUR-B	West Germany	2
EAS	India	3
Cleveland, OH, United States (hard)
AME	United States	4
EUR-A	Spain	1

Final; 9–11 November
San Juan, PR (hard)
EAS	India	1
AME	United States	4

=== Semifinals ===
West Germany vs. India

West Germany
2
Munich, West Germany
4–6 October 1968

India
3

			1	2	3	4	5
1	(West Germany) (India)	Ingo Buding; Premjit Lall	6; 2	2; 6	3; 6	4; 6
2	(West Germany) (India)	Wilhelm Bungert; Ramanathan Krishnan	4; 6	6; 0	8; 6	7; 5
3	(West Germany) (India)	Wilhelm Bungert / Jürgen Fassbender; Ramanathan Krishnan / Jaidip Mukerjea	2; 6	2; 6	3; 6
4	(West Germany) (India)	Ingo Buding; Ramanathan Krishnan	2; 6	5; 7	2; 6
5	(West Germany) (India)	Wilhelm Bungert; Premjit Lall	6; 1	4; 6	6; 4	6; 3

United States vs. Spain

United States
4
Harold Clark Courts, Cleveland, OH, United States
16–19 August 1968
Hard

Spain
1

			1	2	3	4	5
1	(United States) (Spain)	Clark Graebner; Manuel Santana	2; 6	3; 6	3; 6
2	(United States) (Spain)	Arthur Ashe; Juan Gisbert	6; 2	6; 4	6; 2
3	(United States) (Spain)	Clark Graebner / Charlie Pasarell; Juan Gisbert / Manuel Santana	11; 13	17; 15	7; 5	6; 2
4	(United States) (Spain)	Clark Graebner; Juan Gisbert	9; 7	6; 3	6; 1
5	(United States) (Spain)	Arthur Ashe; Manuel Santana	11; 13	7; 5	6; 3	13; 15	6; 4

=== Final ===
United States vs. India

United States
4
Caribe Hilton Hotel, San Juan, Puerto Rico
9–11 November 1968
Hard

India
1

			1	2	3	4	5
1	(United States) (India)	Arthur Ashe; Premjit Lall	6; 2	5; 7	6; 2	6; 4
2	(United States) (India)	Clark Graebner; Ramanathan Krishnan	5; 7	6; 4	2; 6	1; 6
3	(United States) (India)	Bob Lutz / Stan Smith; Ramanathan Krishnan / Jaidip Mukerjea	6; 2	6; 3	6; 2
4	(United States) (India)	Arthur Ashe; Ramanathan Krishnan	6; 1	6; 3	6; 3
5	(United States) (India)	Clark Graebner; Premjit Lall	9; 11	9; 7	7; 5	6; 4

== Challenge Round ==
Australia vs. United States

Australia
1
Memorial Drive Park, Adelaide, Australia
26–28 December 1968
Grass

United States
4

			1	2	3	4	5
1	(Australia) (United States)	Bill Bowrey; Clark Graebner	10; 8	4; 6	6; 8	6; 3	1; 6
2	(Australia) (United States)	Ray Ruffels; Arthur Ashe	8; 6	5; 7	3; 6	3; 6
3	(Australia) (United States)	John Alexander / Ray Ruffels; Bob Lutz / Stan Smith	4; 6	4; 6	2; 6
4	(Australia) (United States)	Ray Ruffels; Clark Graebner	6; 3	6; 8	6; 2	3; 6	1; 6
5	(Australia) (United States)	Bill Bowrey; Arthur Ashe	2; 6	6; 3	11; 9	8; 6

== See also ==
- The White Game, a 1968 Swedish documentary film about the protests around the match between Sweden and Rhodesia.
