= 1972 Torneo Godó =

- Date: 16–23 October
- Edition: 19th
- Category: Grand Prix circuit
- Draw: 32S / 16D
- Prize money: $66,250
- Surface: Clay / outdoor
- Location: Barcelona, Spain
- Venue: Real Club de Tenis Barcelona

Champions

Singles
- (Czechoslovakia) Jan Kodeš

Doubles
- (Spain) Juan Gisbert / (Spain) Manuel Orantes
- Torneo Godó

The 1972 Torneo Godó or Trofeo Conde de Godó was a men's tennis tournament that took place on outdoor clay courts in Barcelona, Spain. It was the 19th edition of the tournament and was part of the 1972 Grand Prix circuit. It was held from 16 October until 23 October 1972. Fifth-seeded Jan Kodeš won the singles title.

== Finals ==
=== Singles ===
(Czechoslovakia) Jan Kodeš defeated (Spain) Manuel Orantes 6–3, 6–2, 6–3

=== Doubles ===
(Spain) Juan Gisbert / (Spain) Manuel Orantes defeated (South Africa) Frew McMillan / (Romania) Ilie Năstase 6–3, 3–6, 6–4
