= Frank Gebert =

German tennis player

- Full name: Frank Gebert
- Country (sports): West Germany
- Born: 6 November 1952 (age 72)

Singles
- Career record: 34–61
- Career titles: 0
- Highest ranking: No. 71 (02 May 1977)

Grand Slam singles results
- Australian Open: 2R (1973)
- French Open: 3R (1976)
- Wimbledon: 1R (1973, 1977)
- US Open: 1R (1977)

Doubles
- Career record: 20–48
- Career titles: 0

Grand Slam doubles results
- Australian Open: 2R (1973)
- French Open: 2R (1976)
- Wimbledon: 1R (1973)

Frank Gebert (born 6 November 1952) is a former professional tennis player from Germany.

== Biography ==
Gebert lost to Byron Bertram in the boys' singles final at the 1970 Wimbledon Championships.

During the 1970s, he competed professionally and he appeared in all four Grand Slam tournaments. He made the third round of the 1976 French Open.

His best year on tour was 1977, when he was a finalist at the Cairo Open. He lost the final to François Jauffret, who he then beat along with Pat DuPré en route to the semi-finals of his next Grand Prix tournament in Murcia. Later in the year, he made further semi-finals in Gstaad and Zürich. He also managed to win the first set against Guillermo Vilas when they met in the Louisville Open.

A graduate of the Free University of Berlin, Gebert is now a professor of economics at SRH University Heidelberg.

== Grand Prix career finals ==
=== Singles: 1 (0–1) ===
Result	W/L	Date	Tournament	Surface	Opponent	Score
Loss	0–1	Mar 1977	Cairo, Egypt	Clay	(France) François Jauffret	3–6, 5–7, 4–6
