= François Jauffret =

French tennis player (born 1942)

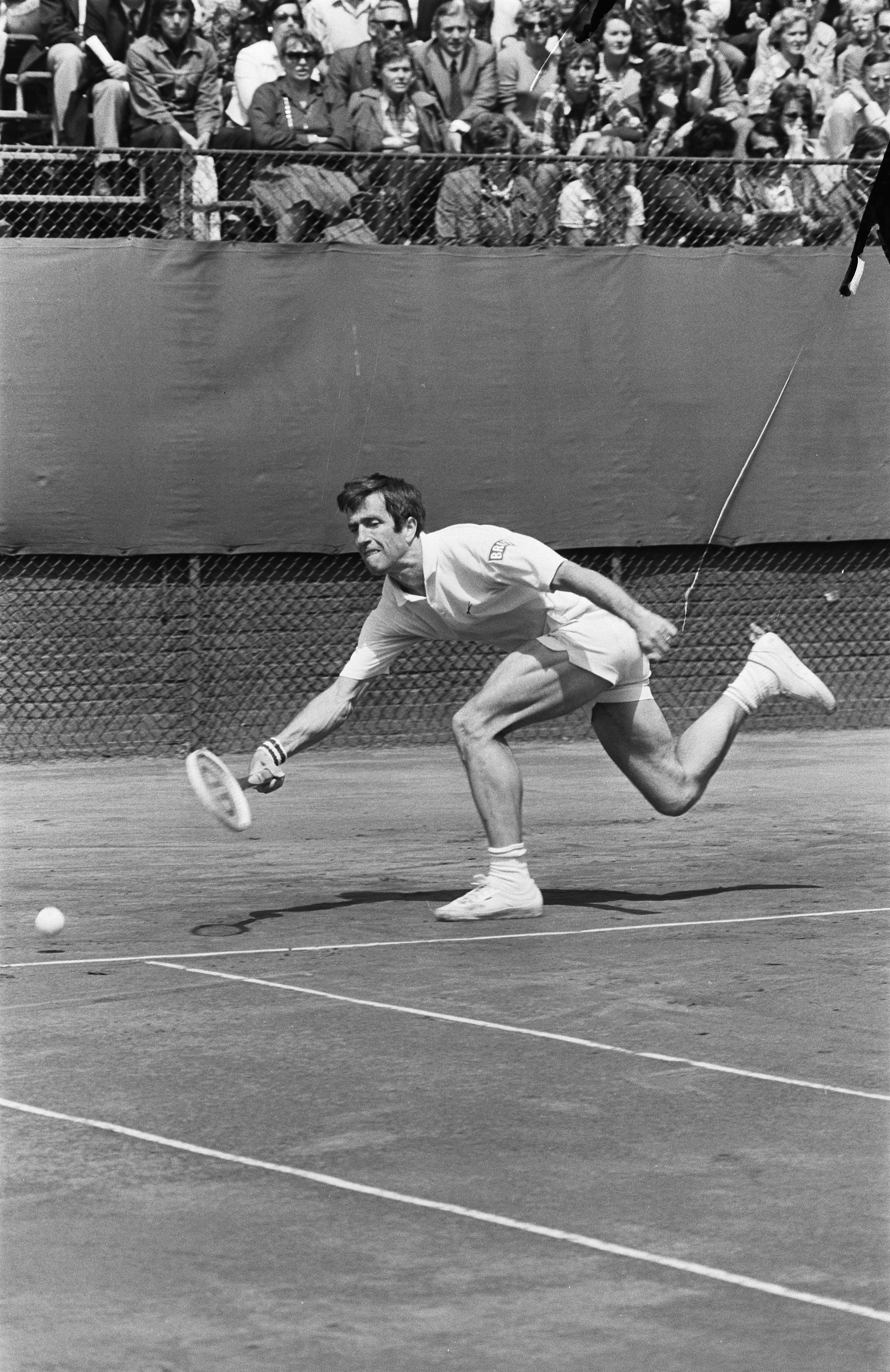
- Country (sports): France
- Born: 9 February 1942 (age 84) Bordeaux, France
- Height: 1.80 m (5 ft 11 in)
- Turned pro: 1968 (amateur from 1961)
- Retired: 1980
- Plays: Right-handed (one-handed backhand)

Singles
- Career record: 173–114 (Open era)
- Career titles: 2
- Highest ranking: No. 20 (6 November 1974)

Grand Slam singles results
- French Open: SF (1966, 1974)
- Wimbledon: 4R (1972)
- US Open: 4R (1975)

Doubles
- Career record: 111–82 (Open era)
- Career titles: 7 (Open era)
- Highest ranking: No. 33 (23 August 1977)

Grand Slam doubles results
- Wimbledon: QF (1969)
Medal record
Tennis
Summer Universiade
Gold medal – first place	1959 Turin	Singles
Bronze medal – third place	1959 Turin	Doubles

François Jauffret (French: [fʁɑ̃swa ʒofʁɛ]; born 9 February 1942) is a retired professional tennis player from France. He holds the record for most ties played for the France Davis Cup team with 35, between 1964 and 1978.

Jauffret twice reached the semi-finals at the Roland Garros, in 1966 (beating Roy Emerson before losing to Tony Roche) and 1974 (beating Jan Kodeš before losing to Manuel Orantes). He won two Open era singles titles (in 1969 in Buenos Aires and in 1977 in Cairo) and seven doubles titles on the ATP Tour in his career. His career-high ATP singles ranking was world No. 20.

He is the brother of businessman Jean-Paul Jauffret (1930-2026). His granddaughter, Capucine Jauffret, is also a tennis player.

== Career finals ==
=== Singles (2 titles, 3 runner-ups) ===
Result	W/L	Date	Tournament	Surface	Opponent	Score
Win	1–0	Nov 1969	Buenos Aires, Argentina	Clay	(Socialist Federal Republic of Yugoslavia) Željko Franulović	3–6, 6–2, 6–4, 6–3
Loss	1–1	May 1971	Paris, France	Clay	(United States) Stan Smith	2–6, 4–6, 5–7
Loss	1–2	May 1974	Munich, West Germany	Clay	(West Germany) Jürgen Fassbender	2–6, 7–5, 1–6, 4–6
Loss	1–3	Mar 1975	Cairo, Egypt	Clay	(Spain) Manuel Orantes	0–6, 6–4, 1–6, 3–6
Win	2–4	Mar 1977	Cairo, Egypt	Clay	(West Germany) Frank Gebert	6–3, 7–5, 6–3

=== Doubles (8 titles, 6 runner-ups) ===
Result	W/L	Date	Tournament	Surface	Partner	Opponents	Score
Loss	0–1	Apr 1971	Nice, France	Clay	(France) Pierre Barthès	(Romania) Ilie Năstase (Romania) Ion Țiriac	3–6, 3–6
Win	1–1	Apr 1971	Catania, Italy	Clay	(France) Pierre Barthès	(Czechoslovakia) Jan Kodeš (Czechoslovakia) Jan Kukal	7–6, 2–6, 6–3
Loss	1–2	May 1971	Paris, France	Clay	(France) Pierre Barthès	(United States) Tom Gorman (United States) Stan Smith	6–3. 5–7, 2–6
Win	2–2	Nov 1972	Paris Indoor, France	Hard (i)	(France) Pierre Barthès	(Spain) Andrés Gimeno (France) Juan Gisbert Sr.	6–3, 6–2
Loss	2–3	Aug 1974	Bretton Woods, US	Clay	(France) Georges Goven	(United States) Jeff Borowiak (Australia) Rod Laver	3–6, 2–6
Win	3–3	Nov 1974	Paris Indoor, France	Hard (i)	(France) Patrice Dominguez	(United States) Brian Gottfried (Mexico) Raúl Ramírez	7–5, 6–4
Win	4–3	Jun 1975	Düsseldorf, West Germany	Clay	(Czechoslovakia) Jan Kodeš	(West Germany) Harald Elschenbroich (Austria) Hans Kary	6–2, 6–3
Loss	4–4	Jul 1975	Kitzbühel, Austria	Clay	(France) Patrice Dominguez	(Italy) Paolo Bertolucci (Italy) Adriano Panatta	2–6, 2–6, 6–7
Win	5–4	Apr 1976	Nice, France	Clay	(France) Patrice Dominguez	(Poland) Wojciech Fibak (West Germany) Karl Meiler	6–4, 3–6, 6–3
Win	6–4	Apr 1977	Monte Carlo WCT, Monaco	Clay	(Czechoslovakia) Jan Kodeš	(Poland) Wojciech Fibak (Netherlands) Tom Okker	2–6, 6–3, 6–2
Win	7–4	Apr 1977	Murcia, Spain	Clay	(France) Patrice Dominguez	(Chile) Patricio Cornejo (Chile) Hans Gildemeister	7–5, 6–2
Loss	7–5	Jul 1977	Båstad, Sweden	Clay	(France) Jean-Louis Haillet	(Australia) Mark Edmondson (Australia) John Marks	4–6, 0–6
Loss	7–6	Jul 1977	Hilversum, Netherlands	Clay	(France) Jean-Louis Haillet	(Spain) José Higueras (Spain) Antonio Muñoz	1–6, 4–6, 6–2, 1–6
Win	8–6	Apr 1978	Nice, France	Clay	(France) Patrice Dominguez	(Czechoslovakia) Jan Kodeš (Czechoslovakia) Tomáš Šmíd	6–4, 6–0
