= 1969 Caribe Hilton Championships =

- Date: March 31–April 6
- Edition: 14th
- Surface: Hard
- Location: San Juan, Puerto Rico
- Venue: Caribe Hilton Hotel

Champions

Men's singles
- (United States) Arthur Ashe

Women's singles
- (Australia) Margaret Court

Men's doubles
- (Australia) Phil Dent / (Australia) John Alexander

Women's doubles
- (Australia) Karen Krantzcke / (Australia) Kerry Melville
← 1968 ·	Caribe Hilton Championships	· 1970 →

The 1969 Caribe Hilton Championships was a combined men's and women's tennis tournament played on hard courts at the Caribe Hilton Hotel in San Juan, Puerto Rico. It was the fourteenth edition of the tournament and was held from on March 31 through April 6, 1969. American Arthur Ashe and Australian Margaret Court won the singles titles.

== Finals ==
=== Men's singles ===
(United States) Arthur Ashe defeated (United States) Charlie Pasarell 5–7, 5–7, 6–0, 6–4, 6–3

=== Women's singles ===
(Australia) Margaret Court defeated (United States) Julie Heldman 6–4, 7–5

=== Men's doubles ===
(Australia) Phil Dent / (Australia) John Alexander defeated (United Kingdom) Mark Cox / (United Kingdom) Peter Curtis 6–3, 6–3

=== Women's doubles ===
(Australia) Karen Krantzcke / (Australia) Kerry Melville defeated (United States) Mary-Ann Eisel / (United States) Valerie Ziegenfuss 6–4, 7–5
