= 1969 Curaçao Tennis Championships =

1969 Curaçao International Championships
- Date: 24 February – 2 March
- Edition: 5th
- Surface: Hard / outdoor
- Location: Willemstad, Curaçao, Dutch West Indies
- Venue: Curaçao Sport Club

Champions

Men's singles
- (Australia) Rod Laver

Women's singles
- (United States) Julie Heldman

Men's doubles
- (Spain) Manuel Orantes / (Australia) Ray Ruffels

Women's doubles
- (Australia) Margaret Court / (Australia) Judy Tegart
← 1968 ·	Curaçao International Championships	· 1970 →

The 1969 Curaçao Tennis Championships was a combined men's and women's professional tennis tournament played on outdoor hard courts at the Curaçao Sport Club in Willemstad, Curaçao, Dutch West Indies. It was the 4th edition of the tournament, the second edition of the Open Era, and was held from 24 February through 2 March 1969. Cliff Richey and Julie Heldman won the singles titles.

== Champions ==
=== Men's singles ===
(United States) Cliff Richey defeated (United Kingdom) Mark Cox 6–4, 6–3, 6–3

=== Women's singles ===
(United States) Julie Heldman defeated (United States) Nancy Richey 5–7, 6–1, 10–8

=== Men's doubles ===
(Spain) Manuel Orantes / (Australia) Ray Ruffels defeated (Sweden) Ove Bengtson / (United Kingdom) Mark Cox 6–4, 6–3

=== Women's doubles ===
(Australia) Margaret Court / (Australia) Judy Tegart defeated (United States) Julie Heldman / (United States) Nancy Richey 6–4, 6–2
