= Caribbean Circuit =

Tennis tour

Details
- Duration: 1925–1973

Achievements (singles)

The Caribbean Circuit also known as the Caribbean Sunshine Circuit or Caribbean Tennis Tour was a series tour of tennis tournaments and part of the larger ILTF Central American and Caribbean Circuit held in the Caribbean region, usually over a period of two to three months between January and March each year.

The circuit began in the mid-1920s reaching prominence during the 1950s and 1960s. It declined in importance in the early 1970s due to an increase in the staging of indoor tournaments, and was eventually phased out.

== History ==
The Caribbean Circuit which was a major sub-circuit of the worldwide ILTF Circuit that began in the early 1920s reaching prominence during the 1950s and 1960s. Officials from the participating regional and national tennis associations, together with tournament organisers met in the summer of the preceding year to agree a schedule of events, and draw up a list of players they wished to invite to participate in the circuit. This was normally announced in December each year. The circuit declined in importance in the early 1970s as a direct result in a rise in prestige of new indoor tennis tournaments at the time.

Depending on the scheduling, the circuit would include other USTA tournaments taking place in Houston such as River Oaks International to form a larger Caribbean-Texas Circuit.

Not all tournaments listed below were staged simultaneously. A schedule of usually eight to twelve tournaments each year over a period of two months was typical. During the peak decades of the 1950s and 1960s, though, this varied.

== Circuit tournaments ==
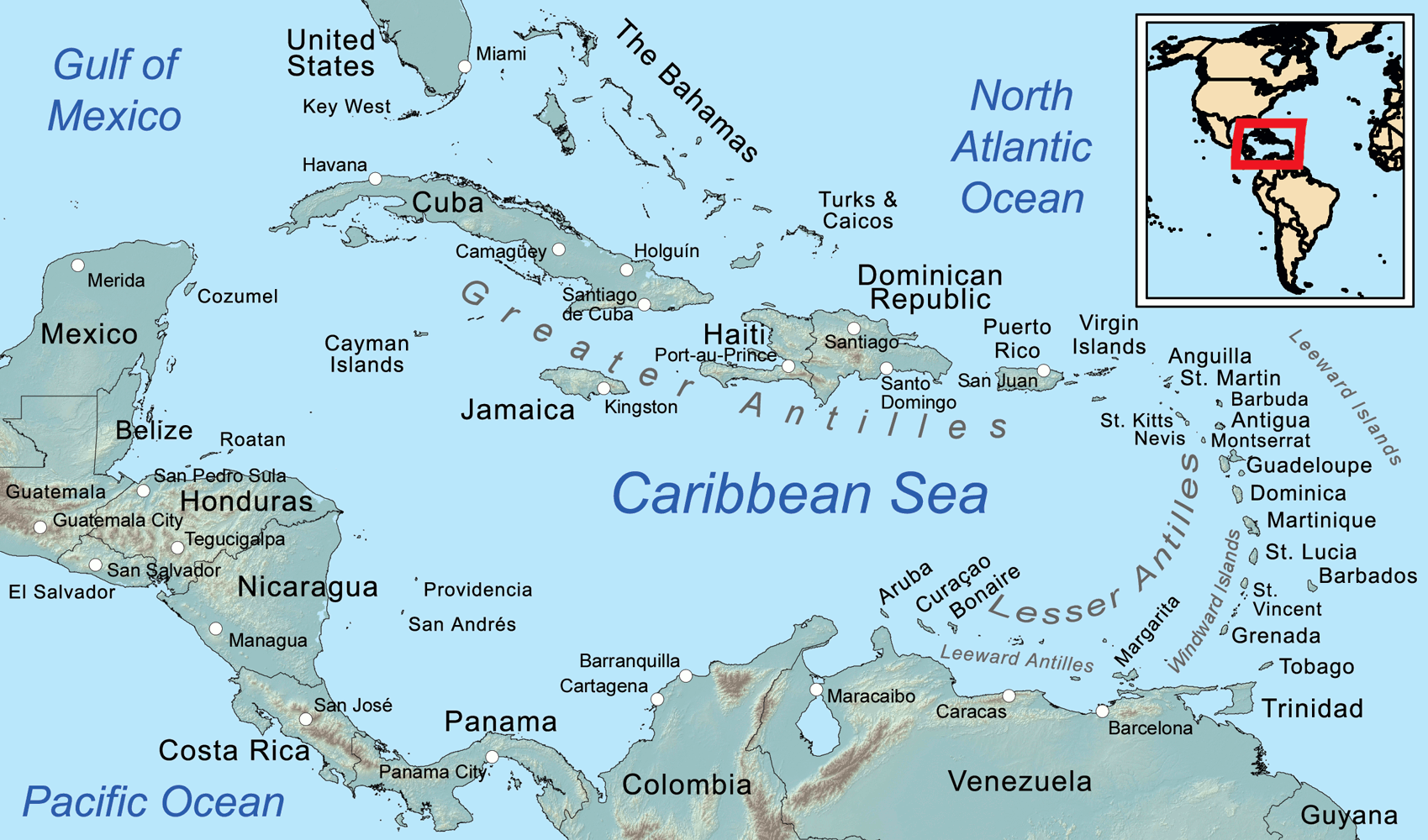
Map of the Caribbean Region

No	Tournament	City	Country
1.	Altamira International	Caracas	Venezuela
2.	Austin Smith Championships	Fort Lauderdale	United States
3.	Bahamas International Championships	Nassau	Bahamas
4.	Barbados International	Bridgetown	Barbados
5.	Caribbean International Championships	Montego Bay	Jamaica
6.	Caribe Hilton International	San Juan	Puerto Rico
7.	Caribe Hilton Championships	San Juan	Puerto Rico
8.	City of Barranquilla Championships	Barranquilla	Colombia
9.	City of Miami Championships	Miami	United States
10.	Colombian International	Barranquilla	Colombia
11.	Cuban International Championships	Havana	Cuba
12.	Curaçao International Championships	Willemstad	Curaçao
13.	Dixie International Championships	Tampa	United States
14.	Good Neighbor Championships	Miami Beach	United States
15.	Havana International	Havana	Cuba
16.	Jacksonville Invitation	Jacksonville	United States
17.	Jamaican International Championships	Kingston	Jamaica
18.	Kingston International Championships	Kingston	Jamaica
19.	Masters Invitational	Tampa Bay area	United States
20.	Mexican International	Mexico City	Mexico
21.	Miami Invitational	Miami	United States
22.	Panama International Championships	Panama City	Panama
23.	River Oaks International (Note: The River Oaks International was occasionally added to the circuit schedule thus creating a larger Caribbean Texas Circuit.)	Houston	United States
24.	St. Andrew International Invitation	Kingston	Jamaica
25.	St. Petersburg Masters Invitational	St. Petersburg	United States
26.	Trinidad International	Port of Spain	Trinidad and Tobago
