= Trinidad International =

Defunct tennis tournament
- Tour: ILTF Caribbean Circuit
- Founded: 1964; 61 years ago
- Abolished: 1969; 56 years ago
- Location: Port of Spain, Trinidad and Tobago
- Venue: Tranquility Square Lawn Tennis Club
- Surface: Clay/Hard

The Trinidad International was a men's and women's international tennis tournament founded in 1964 and played on outdoor clay courts or sometimes hard courts at the Tranquility Square Lawn Tennis Club in Port of Spain, Trinidad and Tobago. The tournament was only held until 1966 as part of the ILTF Caribbean Circuit.

== History ==
The Trinidad International was a men's international tennis tournament founded in 1965 and played on outdoor hard courts at the Tranquility Square Lawn Tennis in Port of Spain, Trinidad and Tobago. The tournament was held until 1966 when it was discontinued.

== Finals ==
=== Men's Singles ===
:Included.

Year	Champion	Runner-up	Score
1964	(Australia) Roy Emerson	(Australia) Ken Fletcher	4-6, 6–4, 6–2, 11-9
1965	(Spain) Manuel Santana	(India) Ramanathan Krishnan	7-5, 6–1, 6-4
1966	(Australia) John Newcombe	(Australia) Tony Roche	6-3, 3–6, 9–7, 7-5
Event discontinued

=== Women's Singles ===
Year	Champion	Runner-up	Score
1964	(United States) Judy Alvarez	(United Kingdom) Rita Bentley	6-1, 8-6
1965	(Australia) Lesley Turner	(France) Françoise Dürr	7-5, 6-2
1966	(Australia) Robyn Ebbern	(Mexico) Elena Subirats	1-6, 7–5, 6-4
Event discontinued
