= Old Fort of Nassau =

Historic fort in Nassau, Bahamas

Old Fort Nassau
- Old Fort Nassau, The Bahamas

Site information
- Type: Defense
- Condition: Destroyed and replaced by British Colonial Hotel

Location
- Old Fort Nassau Old Fort Nassau (North America)
- Coordinates: 25.078333°N 77.345556°W

Site history
- Built: 1697
- Built by: William III

The Old Fort of Nassau, also known as Fort Nassau, was a fort in Nassau, Bahamas, first built in 1697. The fort lasted for nearly two hundred years with a rich legacy of history until it was finally demolished in 1897. It was located on the north side of Marlborough Street, on the site of the current British Colonial Hotel. Remnants of the old walls can be seen on the hotel grounds. For many years it was the only fort in Nassau.

Even though Columbus was the first to think of building forts in his newfound islands in Bahamas to secure it for Spain, the idea was put into action only in 1687 by private people with intent on piracy oriented actions, with the tacit compliance of the then governors of the islands, in the Caribbean. The reason for establishing the fort at Bahamas was the sacking of the town and killing of the British Governor by the Spanish with support from French ships which had caused the islanders to flee. In order to prevent further such attacks, at the intervention of Charles II, in 1684 the town was resettled. In order to make the town more secure, an Act was passed in 1695 not only for building of the town but also a defensive fort. This fort was built in 1697 and named Fort Nassau, after King William III (House of Orange-Nassau). It underwent several invasions, rebuilding and eventual dismantling in 1897.

When built in 1697 the fort was fortified with twenty-two cannons. In just three years, part of the fort was damaged in an attack by the Spaniards in 1700, and two years later in 1702 Governor Elias Haskett was imprisoned in the fort. The allied forces of Spain and France attacked New Providence when the fort suffered severe damages with the guns getting immobilized and the inhabitants forced to leave the town. Soon pirates operating from the fort became a common event.

In 1718, on the urgings of the business community of London, George I appointed Captain Woodes Rogers to be the governor of the island. Rogers' expedition arrived with the mandate to eliminate the pirate community. Rogers was successful in doing this through a combination of force and amnesties, and began to rebuild the island's fortifications. In 1741 that a serious effort was made to get the fort restored under the guidance of an experienced engineer. The fort was renovated in 1744 with fifty-four cannons and twenty-six brass mortars. The process of neglect and frequent repairs followed and in 1776 the fort was attacked by the American Colonies who were fighting the British forces, to capture the ammunition stored here. The American naval forces found only one hundred guns, since the ammunition had been stealthily moved to Boston before the attack. However, the Governor had been taken hostage in the bargain.

The last act of attack on the fort was by the Spaniards in 1782, when they took control of the fort and held it until the war with England ended in 1783. During this time, the valiant effort made by Colonel Deveaux to recapture the fort was fruitful, bringing an end to the saga of repeated attack and destruction of the fort. The fort was garrisoned in 1787 and a new fort (Fort Charlotte) was ordered to be built to defend the island. In the French Revolution that followed, the old fort was allowed to remain in a state of disrepair until it was decided to fully demolish it in 1897.

It was at the ruins of this fort on its western wing that the British Colonial Hotel was built.

== Layout ==
The fort was built of stone in the shape of a 4-pointed star with its two high walled ends projecting northward into the harbor. The fort guarded the western end of the port. However, the reasons for the repeated damages suffered by the fort were attributed to its strategically poor location on a hill promontory which could be easily attacked from the higher hills to its south from where it was subjected to frequent and effective bombardments even with smaller sized guns.
