= Curaçao International Championships =

Curaçao International Championships Internationale Kampioenschappen van Curaçao

Defunct tennis tournament
- Tour: ILTF Circuit
- Founded: 1965; 61 years ago
- Abolished: 1970; 56 years ago
- Location: Willemstad, Curaçao, Netherlands Antilles
- Venue: Curaçao Sport Club
- Surface: Hard (outdoor)

The Curaçao International Championships or Internationale Kampioenschappen van Curaçao or simply known as the Curaçao International was a men's and women's international hard court tennis tournament established in 1965. It was played on outdoor courts at the Curaçao Sport Club, Willemstad, Curaçao, Netherlands Antilles until 1970. It was part of the South Florida-Caribbean tennis circuit during its run.

== History ==
The Curaçao International Championships were founded as a permanent fixture in 1965 (although international tournaments were staged in Curaçao as early as the 1940s). The championships were last played at the Curaçao Sport Club, Willemstad, Curaçao, in what was then the Netherlands Antilles. The tournament was part of the Caribbean Circuit which was a major feature of the international tennis scene from the 1930s to early 1970s. In 1970 it formed part of the circuit that year that included tournaments in Caracas, Barranquilla, Jacksonville, San Juan, St. Petersberg, Mexico City and Houston, the Curaçao event offered $10,000 in prize money for the first time.

== Finals ==
=== Men's Singles ===
Incomplete roll

Results included:

Year	Champion	Runner-up	Score
1965	(United States) Dennis Ralston	(United States) Frank Froehling	6-1, 9–11, 6-4
1966	(Brazil) José Edison Mandarino	(Socialist Federal Republic of Yugoslavia) Nikola Pilić	2-6, 6–1, 6–4, 6-4
1967	(Australia) Tony Roche	(United Kingdom) Roger Taylor	3-6, 4–6, 9–7, 6–1, 6-1
Open era
1968	(United States) Marty Riessen	(Netherlands) Tom Okker	7-5, 3–6, 9–11, 6–2, 6-2
1969	(United States) Cliff Richey	(United Kingdom) Mark Cox	6-4, 6–3, 6-3
1970	(United Kingdom) Gerald Battrick	(Spain) Juan Gisbert Sr.	2-6, 6–3, 7–5, 6-4

=== Women's Singles ===
Incomplete roll

Year	Champion	Runner-up	Score
1965	(Netherlands) Trudy Groenman	(Netherlands) Elly Krocké	6-4, 6-2
1966	(Australia) Norma Baylon	(United States) Donna Floyd Fales	6-4, 6-2
1967	(United Kingdom) Ann Haydon Jones	(France) Françoise Dürr	6-1, 6-2
Open era
1968	(United States) Nancy Richey	(Australia) Judy Tegart	2-6, 6–1, 6-2
1969	(United States) Julie Heldman	(United States) Nancy Richey	5-7, 6–1, 10-8
1970	(United States) Peaches Bartkowicz	(United Kingdom) Nell Truman	6-4, 6-0
