= Bahamas International Open =

Defunct tennis tournament
- Tour: IPA circuit
- Founded: 1972
- Abolished: 1980
- Editions: 9
- Location: Freeport & Nassau, Bahamas
- Surface: Hard / outdoor

The Bahamas International Open is a defunct men's tennis founded in 1972. In 1975 the tournament that was part of Bill Riordan's International Players Association (IPA) circuit, that event with $50,000 prize money was held in Freeport, Bahamas. It was moved to Nassau in 1976 and was played on outdoor hard courts until 1980.

== History ==
In 1922 a Bahamas International Championships was founded in Nassau and was played on outdoor clay courts. That first tournament was staged though till 1936 when it was discontinued. This second Bahamas International tournament was founded in 1972 again in Nassau, but was played on outdoor hard courts. In 1975 the tournament moved to Freeport for one edition only before returning back to Nassau until 1980 when the tournament was discontinued.

== Past finals ==
Incomplete roll

Year	Champions	Runners-up	Score
1973	(United States) Brian Gottfried	(United Kingdom) Buster Mottram	6–2, 6–3, 6–2
1975	(United States) Jimmy Connors	(Germany) Karl Meiler	6–0, 6–2
1976	(United States) Jeff Borowiak	(United States) Gene Mayer	6–7, 6–2, 6–4
1977	(United States) Cliff Richey	(United States) John McEnroe	7–5, 4–6, 6–2
1979	(United States) Harold Solomon	(United States) Van Winitsky	7–6, 6–1
1980	(United States) Mel Purcell	(United Kingdom) Buster Mottram	6–4, 3–6, 6–3
