= Bahamas International Championships =

Defunct tennis tournament
- Founded: 1922
- Abolished: 1936
- Location: Nassau, Bahamas
- Venue: New Colonial Hotel Courts
- Surface: Clay / outdoor

The Bahamas International Championships or Bahamas Championships was a men's tennis tournament founded in 1922. It was played on outdoor clay courts at the New Colonial Hotel Courts, Nassau, Bahamas until 1936.

== History ==
In 1922 a Bahamas International Championships was founded and financed by the American banker William Henry Crocker, and was played on outdoor clay courts at the New Colonial Hotel Courts, Nassau, Bahamas. The first Bahamas International tournament was part of the Caribbean Circuit and staged though till 1936 when it was discontinued.

In 1972 a second Bahamas International Open tournament was established in Nassau, but this time it was played on outdoor hard courts. In 1975 the tournament was moved to Freeport for one edition only before returning to Nassau from 1976 until 1980 when the tournament was discontinued.

== Past finals ==
Incomplete roll

Year	Champions	Runners-up	Score
1922	(United States) G. Carlton Shafer	(United States) William Rosenbaum	6-3, 5–7, 6–1, 6-4
1923	(United States) Beals Wright	(United States) G. Carlton Shafer	7-5, 6–1, 6-4
1929	(The Bahamas) E.A. Boyce	(United States) Charles Warren	6-1, 6–3, 6-1
1930	(The Bahamas) Alexander Henderson	(The Bahamas) Cedric Woodward	7-5, 6–8, 6–2, 6-1
1931	(The Bahamas) E.A. Boyce	(United States) Charles Warren	6-1, 6–2, 6-1
1936	(United States) J. Gilbert Hall	(Cuba) Ricardo Morales	7-5, 5–7, 6–1, 6-1
