= Madrid International =

Defunct tennis tournament
- Event name: Madrid Championships (1906-1934); Puerta de Hierro International (1950-1964); Championships of Madrid (1965); Madrid Puerta de Hierro International (1966-1969); Madrid International (1970-1975)
- Tour: ILTF World Circuit
- Founded: 1906
- Abolished: 1975
- Location: Madrid; Spain
- Venue: Real Club Puerta de Hierro
- Surface: Clay / outdoors

The Madrid International was a combined clay court tennis tournament founded in 1906, as the Madrid Championships, that event was held intermittently until the early 1930s then ended due to the Spanish Civil War and World War II. In 1950 the event was revived as the Madrid Puerta de Hierro International and was played continually at the Real Club Puerta de Hierro, Madrid, Spain, until 1975 when it was last branded under its last title name.

== History ==
Founded in 1906 as the Madrid Championships it first ran till the mid-1930s then stopped due the Spanish Civil War. In 1950 it was revived and rebranded as the Madrid International. This event was usually played in the Spring in April and by the earlier 1970s had the ATP Tour designation Madrid 1.

In 1973 a second Madrid International II was established that was initially played at the Real Sociedad Hípica Española Club de Campo in October annually. In 1974 that event was rebranded as the Madrid Open or by its sponsored name Melia Trophy. In 1975 the original Madrid International this tournament ended. In October 1975 the Madrid 2 event moved dates in the calendar to the vacant slot starting in April 1976 and assumed the original title name, this event later became known as the Madrid Tennis Grand Prix.

== Finals ==
=== Men's singles ===
(incomplete roll) included:

Year	Winners	Runners-up	Score
1906	(United Kingdom) Sidney Head	(Spain) José Beristaín	6–1, 6–1
1907	(Spain) José Beristaín	(Spain) Marcelino José Azlor	def.
1910	(Spain) Luis de Uhagon	(Spain) Vicente Bertrán	6–1, 1–6, 5–7, 6–4, 6–2
1913	(France) Max Decugis	(Germany) Ludwig Von Salm	6–4, 6–3, 6–2
1920	(Germany) Otto Froitzheim	(Spain) Manuel Alonso Areizaga	6-4, 6–4, 6–3
1923	(Spain) Manuel de Gomar	(Spain) Eduardo Flaquer	in 3 sets
1925	(France) Rene Lacoste	(Spain) Eduardo Flaquer	6–4, 3–6, 7–5, 6–4
1934	(France) Jean Lesueur	(Spain) Enrique Maier	6–1, 6–3, 1–6, 6–3
1936/1949	Not held		
1950	(Egypt) Jaroslav Drobny	(Philippines) Felicisimo Ampon	3–6, 6–0, 6–2, 6–4
1953	(Egypt) Jaroslav Drobny (2)	(Sweden) Sven Davidson	8–6, 6–4 3–7, 7–6
1958	(Spain) Andres Gimeno	(Cuba) Reynaldo Garrido	6–4, 6–2, 6–4
1960	(Chile) Luis Ayala	(Spain) Andres Gimeno	0–6, 6–4, 6–2, 6–3
1961	(Spain) Juan Manuel Couder	(Australia) Neil Gibson	6–1, 7–5, 6–3
1962	(Spain) Manuel Santana	(Australia) Roy Emerson	5–7, 6–4, 9–7, 6–8, 6–4
1963	(Spain) Manuel Santana (2)	(Spain) Juan Manuel Couder	6–1, 6–0, 6–3
1964	(Spain) Manuel Santana (3)	(Mexico) Rafael Osuna	6–1, 6–3, 6–4
1965	(Spain) Manuel Santana (4)	(Spain) Juan Manuel Couder	6–1, 4–6, 0–6, 6–4, 6–3
1966	(Brazil) Thomaz Koch	(Brazil) José Edison Mandarino	8–6, 6–1
1967	(Sweden) Jan-Erik Lundqvist	(Australia) Roy Emerson	3–6, 6–3, 6–4, 6–4
1968	(Spain) Manuel Santana (5)	(United States) Herb Fitzgibbon	6–3, 4–6, 4–6, 6–3, 6–4
↓ Open Era ↓
1969	(Spain) Manuel Santana (6)	(United States) Arthur Ashe	9–11, 6–4, 8–6, 6–1
1970	(Spain) Manuel Santana (7)	(Australia) Lew Hoad	6–3, 8–10, 6–3, 6–0
1971	(Romania) Ion Tiriac	(Romania) Ilie Năstase	7–5, 6–1, 6–0
1972	(Romania) Ilie Năstase	(Czechoslovakia) František Pála	6–0, 6–0, 6–1
1973	(Romania) Ilie Năstase (2)	(Italy) Adriano Panatta	6–3, 7–6, 5–7, 6–1
1975	(Romania) Ilie Năstase (3)	(Spain) Manuel Orantes	7–6, 6–1, 2–6, 6–3

=== Men's doubles ===
(incomplete roll)

Year	Champions	Runners-up	Score
1972	(Romania) Ilie Năstase (United States) Stan Smith	(Spain) Andrés Gimeno (Spain) Manuel Orantes	6–3, 6–4, 6–4

=== Women's singles ===
(incomplete roll) two editions of the women's event was held in 1967

Year	Winners	Runners-up	Score
1911	(Spain) Maria de Irujo	(Spain) Luisa Carvajal	6-3, 5–7, 6–3
1912	(Spain) Carmen Witty	(Spain) Luisa Carvajal	6-1, 6–3
1913	(United States) Elizabeth Ryan	(France) Marie Decugis	6-1, 6–2
1916	(Spain) Maria Rospide	(Spain) Carmen Portago	8-6, 4–6, 6–4
1923	(Spain) Lilí Álvarez	(United Kingdom) Phyllis Covell	6-1 3-6 6–4
1924	(Spain) Lilí Álvarez	(France) Cosette Saint-Omer-Roy	6-3, 7–5
1950	(Argentina) Mary Terán de Weiss	(Spain) Pilar Barril	7-5, 4–6, 6–2
1960	(Spain) Ana María Estalella	(France) Rosie Reyes Darmon	6-1, 2–6, 6–3
1961	(Argentina) Nora Somoza	(Argentina) Mabel Bove	6-4, 6–3
1962	(West Germany) Edda Buding	(West Germany) Heidi Schildknecht	6-3, 6–3
1964	(France) Jacqueline Rees-Lewis	(West Germany) Heidi Schildknecht	6-4, 6–2
1965	(West Germany) Helga Schultze	(West Germany) Edda Buding	3-6, 6–0, 6–3
1966	(United Kingdom) Frances MacLennan	(Sweden) Eva Lundqvist	4-6, 6–2, 6–0
1967	(Sweden) Eva Lundqvist	(United States) Alice Tym	6-2, 0-6 6–1
1967	(Spain) Ana Maria Estalella	(Australia) Sue Alexander	6-2 6–4
1968	(West Germany) Helga Niessen	(United Kingdom) Frances MacLennan	6-1, 6–3
↓ Open Era ↓
1970	(West Germany) Helga Schultze	(Spain) Carmen Mandarino	6-2, 6–0
1971	(United Kingdom) Winnie Shaw	(Australia) Lesley Hunt	5-7, 6–1, 6–1
1972	(United States) Linda Tuero	(Czechoslovakia) Alena Palmeova West	6-3, 6–1
1974	(United Kingdom) Sue Battersby	(Spain) Silvia Blume-Bruns	6-4 6–3
1975	(Spain) Vicky Baldovinos	(United Kingdom) Michelle Tyler	3-6, 6-1 6–1

== Event names ==
Official

- Madrid Championships (1906–1934)
- Puerta de Hierro International (1950–1964)
- Championships of Madrid (1965, 1967 II)
- Madrid Puerta de Hierro International (1966–1969)
- Madrid International (1970–73, 1975)
- Winter Time Madrid International (1974)

Sponsored

- Melia Trophy International (1972)
- Rothmans Madrid International (1973)

== See also ==
- Madrid Tennis Grand Prix (1973–94) successor event to Madrid International.
- Madrid Open (2002-current) successor event to Madrid Grand Prix.
