= Roger Taylor (tennis) =

British tennis player (born 1941)

Roger Taylor MBE
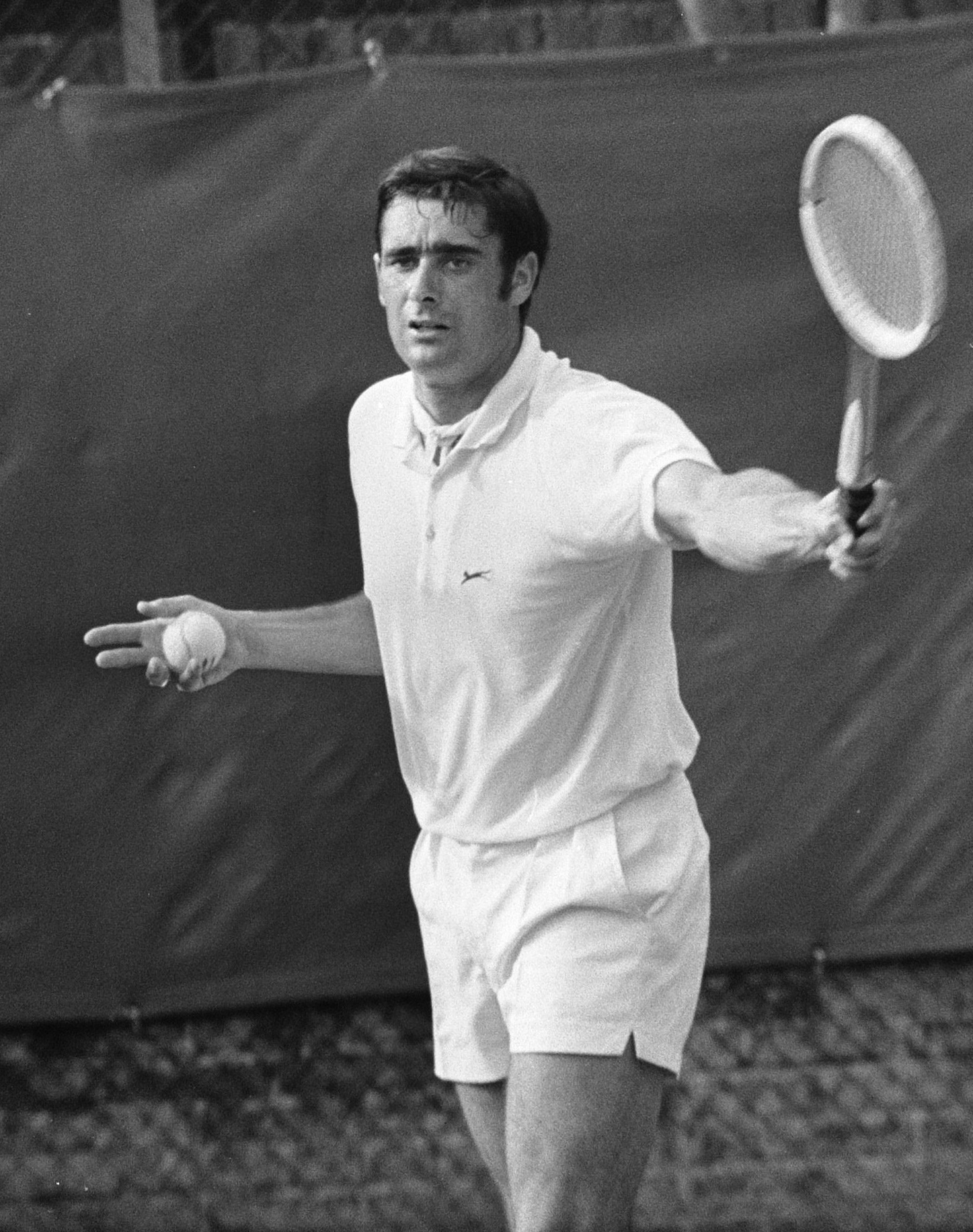
- Roger Taylor at the 1969 Dutch Open
- Country (sports): United Kingdom
- Residence: Wimbledon, London, England
- Born: 14 October 1941 (age 84) Sheffield, Yorkshire, England
- Height: 1.83 m (6 ft 0 in)
- Turned pro: 1967 (amateur from 1958)
- Retired: 1982
- Plays: Left-handed (one-handed backhand)

Singles
- Career record: 776–489
- Career titles: 31
- Highest ranking: No. 8 (1970, Lance Tingay)

Grand Slam singles results
- Australian Open: SF (1970)
- French Open: QF (1973)
- Wimbledon: SF (1967, 1970, 1973)
- US Open: QF (1964)

Other tournaments
- WCT Finals: QF (1973)

Doubles
- Career record: 189–140
- Career titles: 10

Grand Slam doubles results
- Australian Open: QF (1962)
- French Open: 3R (1963)
- Wimbledon: QF (1968, 1969, 1973)
- US Open: W (1971, 1972)

Roger Taylor MBE (born 14 October 1941) is a British former tennis player, born in Sheffield, South Yorkshire. He achieved success at several Grand Slam tournaments, reaching the quarter-finals of the French Open in 1973, the semi-finals of Wimbledon during the same year and winning back to back US Open men's doubles titles in 1971 and 1972. He also enjoyed particular success in 1970, again reaching the semi-finals of Wimbledon, where he achieved an upset win over defending champion Rod Laver en route, and the semi-finals of the Australian Open. Taylor also reached the semi-finals at Wimbledon in 1967. His career-high ATP ranking was 11 in its early listings in 1973; earlier unofficial year-end listings ranked him joint-7th (amateur) for 1967 and 8th (open) for 1970.

He was active from 1958 to 1982 and won 31 career singles titles, of those toward the end of his career included 6 Grand Prix tour singles titles and 10 doubles titles.

He was also ranked British No 1 1973 and 1974. Additionally, Taylor scored 29 wins and 11 losses at the Great Britain Davis Cup team. He is a member of the AELTC.

Taylor is the former husband of tennis player Frances MacLennan, whom he married in 1969. The couple had three children.

== Tennis career ==
Taylor was shown how to play tennis by his mother, Lilian, and he used to play in various parks across Sheffield, such as Weston Park. He often practised by hitting a tennis ball against a wall. He played his first singles tournament at the South of France Championships in 1958. He won his first singles title in 1959 at the Lee-on-Solent Open. Taylor was the sole British member of the so-called Handsome Eight signed by Lamar Hunt to compete in his newly created World Championship Tennis tour in 1968.

Taylor endeared himself to millions of viewers during his 1973 Wimbledon quarterfinal match against the 17-year-old Wimbledon debutant Björn Borg. Having already been declared the match winner by the umpire following his match-point serve which was disputed by Borg, Taylor voluntarily offered to replay the point. The linesman then questioned by the umpire as to whether he wished to reconsider his decision, changed his "in" call to "out" and the umpire requested that the point be replayed as a "let". Taylor subsequently went on to win the match, but lost to eventual champion Jan Kodeš in the semifinals. He won his final singles title at the Fairfield Open Indoors in March 1975.

He played his final singles tournament at the Caribbean International Championships in 1982. He retired from professional tennis in 1983 and following his retirement he operated tennis holidays. He was Great Britain's Davis Cup captain from February 2000 until January 2004. Taylor also captained the British ladies Wightman Cup team; steering them to their last victory in the competition in 1978. He was awarded an MBE in the 1977 Silver Jubilee and Birthday Honours.

He is currently active on the ITF Seniors Tour and has a singles ranking of 54 as at 2020 in the over 75's category. He won the 70+ title at Woking's Veterans Open Tournament in 2012. In 2019, he teamed up with Australia's Gordon Waygood to win the Men's 75 Doubles title at the British Open Seniors Clay Court Championships.

== Grand Slam finals ==
=== Doubles (2 titles) ===
Result	Year	Championship	Surface	Partner	Opponents	Score
Win	1971	US Open	Grass	(Australia) John Newcombe	(United States) Stan Smith (United States) Erik van Dillen	6–7, 6–3, 7–6, 4–6, 7–6
Win	1972	US Open	Grass	(South Africa) Cliff Drysdale	(Australia) Owen Davidson (Australia) John Newcombe	6–4, 7–6, 6–3

== Open Era career finals ==
=== Singles: 19 (9 titles / 10 runner-ups) ===
Finals by surface
Hard (4–2)
Grass (2–3)
Clay (1–3)
Carpet (2–2)

Result	W-L	Date	Tournament	Surface	Opponent	Score
Win	1–0	Oct 1968	Port Elizabeth WCT, South Africa	Hard	(Australia) Tony Roche	10–8
Loss	1–1	Aug 1969	Hilversum, Netherlands	Clay	(Netherlands) Tom Okker	8–10, 9–7, 4–6, 4–6
Loss	1–2	Dec 1969	Madrid, Spain	Carpet	(Australia) Rod Laver	3–6, 3–6
Win	2–2	Feb 1970	Auckland, New Zealand	Grass	(Netherlands) Tom Okker	6–4, 6–4, 6–1
Loss	2–3	Jul 1970	Leicester, England	Grass	(Netherlands) Tom Okker	1–6, 8–10
Loss	2–4	Aug 1970	Hilversum, Netherlands	Clay	(Netherlands) Tom Okker	6–4, 0–6, 1–6, 3–6
Loss	2–5	Aug 1970	Toronto, Canada	Clay	(Australia) Rod Laver	0–6, 6–4, 3–6
Win	3–5	Oct 1970	Midland, US	Hard	(Australia) John Newcombe	2–6, 7–6, 6–1
Win	4–5	Apr 1971	Palermo, Italy	Clay	(France) Pierre Barthès	6–3, 4–6, 7–6, 6–2
Loss	4–6	Jul 1971	Newport, UK	Grass	(Australia) Ken Rosewall	1–6, 8–9
Win	5–6	Aug 1972	Haverford, US	Hard	(Australia) Mal Anderson	6–4, 6–0, 6–4
Win	6–6	Feb 1973	Copenhagen, Denmark	Hard	(United States) Marty Riessen	6–2, 6–3, 7–6
Loss	6–7	Mar 1973	Chicago WCT, US	Carpet (i)	(United States) Arthur Ashe	6–3, 6–7, 6–7
Loss	6–8	Mar 1973	San Juan, Puerto Rico	Hard	(Soviet Union) Alex Metreveli	4–6, 4–6, 6–0, 5–7
Loss	6–9	Apr 1973	Cleveland WCT, US	Hard	(Australia) Ken Rosewall	3–6, 4–6
Loss	6–10	Jun 1973	Queen's Club, England	Grass	(Romania) Ilie Năstase	8–9, 3–6
Win	7–10	Jul 1973	Newport, UK	Grass	(Australia) Bob Giltinan	9–8, 8–6
Win	8–10	Feb 1975	Roanoke, US	Carpet (i)	(United States) Vitas Gerulaitis	7–6, 7–6
Win	9–10	Feb 1975	Fairfield, US	Carpet (i)	(United States) Sandy Mayer	7–5, 5–7, 7–6

=== Doubles: 21 (11 titles / 10 runner-ups) ===
Result	W-L	Date		Surface	Partner	Opponent	Score
Loss	0–1	Sep 1968	Los Angeles, US	Hard	(South Africa) Cliff Drysdale	(Australia) Ken Rosewall (Australia) Fred Stolle	5–7, 1–6
Win	1–1	Jan 1969	Hobart, Australia	Grass	(Australia) Mal Anderson	(Australia) Tony Roche (Australia) Fred Stolle	7–5, 6–3, 4–6, 1–6, 6–4
Win	2–1	Feb 1969	Auckland, New Zealand	Grass	(South Africa) Ray Moore	(Australia) Mal Anderson (Soviet Union) Toomas Leius	13–15, 6–3, 8–6, 8–6
Loss	2–2	Jun 1969	Bristol, UK	Grass	(South Africa) Cliff Drysdale	(Australia) John Newcombe (United States) Marty Riessen	6–4, 13–15, 3–6
Loss	2–3	Jul 1969	Dublin, Ireland	Grass	(Socialist Federal Republic of Yugoslavia) Nikola Pilić	(South Africa) Bob Hewitt (South Africa) Frew McMillan	2–6, 6–2, 5–7
Win	3–3	Aug 1969	Hilversum, Netherlands	Unknown	(Netherlands) Tom Okker	(Czechoslovakia) Jan Kodeš (Czechoslovakia) Jan Kukal	6–3, 6–2, 6–4
Loss	3–4	Aug 1969	Rhode Island, US	Grass	(United States) Dennis Ralston	(Netherlands) Tom Okker (United States) Marty Riessen	3–6, 6–3, 1–6
Win	4–4	Apr 1970	Monte Carlo, Monaco	Clay	(United States) Marty Riessen	(France) Pierre Barthès (Socialist Federal Republic of Yugoslavia) Nikola Pilić	6–3, 6–4, 6–2
Win	5–4	Jul 1970	Gstaad, Switzerland	Clay	(South Africa) Cliff Drysdale	(Netherlands) Tom Okker (United States) Marty Riessen	6–2, 6–3, 6–2
Loss	5–5	Apr 1971	Monte Carlo, Monaco	Clay	(Netherlands) Tom Okker	(Romania) Ilie Năstase (Romania) Ion Țiriac	6–1, 3–6, 3–6, 6–8
Loss	5–6	May 1971	Rome, Italy	Clay	(Spain) Andrés Gimeno	(Australia) John Newcombe (Australia) Tony Roche	4–6, 4–6
Win	6–6	Jul 1971	Newport, UK	Grass	(Australia) Ken Rosewall	(United Kingdom) John Clifton (United Kingdom) John Paish	7–5, 3–6, 6–2
Win	7–6	Sep 1971	US Open	Grass	(Australia) John Newcombe	(United States) Stan Smith (United States) Erik van Dillen	6–7, 6–3, 7–6, 4–6, 7–6
Win	8–6	Aug 1972	Cleveland	Hard	(South Africa) Cliff Drysdale	(United States) Frank Froehling (United States) Charlie Pasarell	7–6, 6–3
Win	9–6	Sep 1972	US Open	Grass	(South Africa) Cliff Drysdale	(Australia) Owen Davidson (Australia) John Newcombe	6–4, 7–6, 6–3
Win	10–6	Apr 1973	Vancouver, Canada	Unknown	(France) Pierre Barthès	(United States) Tom Gorman (United States) Erik van Dillen	5–7, 6–3, 7–6
Loss	10–7	Apr 1974	Tokyo WCT, Japan	Hard	(Spain) Juan Gisbert Sr.	(South Africa) Raymond Moore (New Zealand) Onny Parun	6–4, 2–6, 4–6
Loss	10–7	Feb 1975	Salibury, US	Carpet (i)	(Czechoslovakia) Jan Kodeš	(United States) Jimmy Connors (Romania) Ilie Năstase	6–7, 2–6
Win	11–7	Jul 1977	Kitzbühel, Austria	Clay	(United Kingdom) Buster Mottram	(Switzerland) Colin Dowdeswell (Australia) Chris Kachel	7–6, 6–4
Loss	11–9	Oct 1977	Paris, France	Hard	(United States) Jeff Borowiak	(United States) Brian Gottfried (Mexico) Raúl Ramírez	2–6, 0–6
Loss	11–10	Jan 1978	Baltimore, US	Carpet	(Italy) Tonino Zugarelli	(South Africa) Frew McMillan (United States) Fred McNair	3–6, 5–7
