= Manuel Santana =

Spanish tennis player (1938–2021)

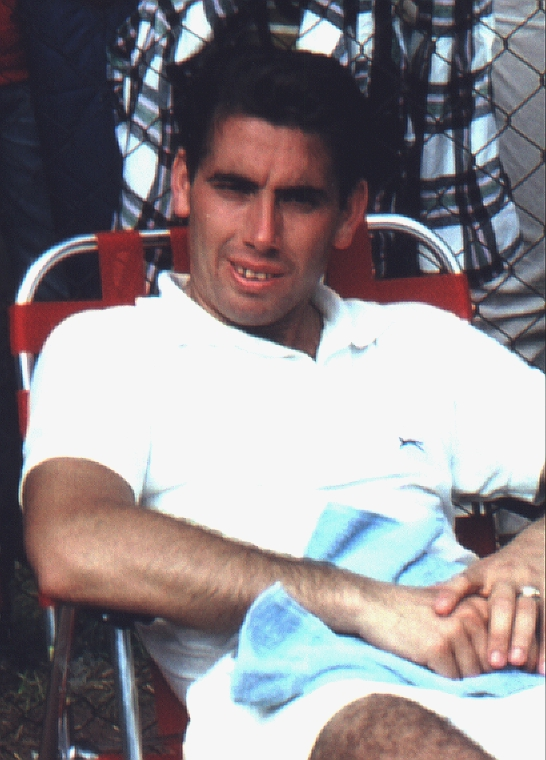
- Santana in 1964
- Full name: Manuel Santana Martínez
- Country (sports): Spain
- Born: 10 May 1938 Madrid, Spain
- Died: 11 December 2021 (aged 83) Marbella, Spain
- Turned pro: 1968 (amateur from 1956)
- Retired: 1977
- Plays: Right-handed (one-handed backhand)
- Int. Tennis HoF: 1984 (member page)

Singles
- Career record: 864–227 (79.1%)
- Career titles: 94
- Highest ranking: No. 1 (1965, Ned Potter)

Grand Slam singles results
- French Open: W (1961, 1964)
- Wimbledon: W (1966)
- US Open: W (1965)

Other tournaments
- Olympic Games: W (1968, demonstration)

Doubles
- Career record: 20–22

Grand Slam doubles results
- French Open: W (1963)
- Wimbledon: SF (1963)

Other doubles tournaments
- Olympic Games: F (1968, demonstration)

Team competitions
- Davis Cup: F (1965^{Ch}, 1967^{Ch}, 1970)
Medal record
Representing Spain
Mediterranean Games
Gold medal – first place	1967 Tunis	Singles
Gold medal – first place	1967 Tunis	Doubles
Silver medal – second place	1963 Naples	Singles
Bronze medal – third place	1963 Naples	Doubles

Manuel Santana Martínez (10 May 1938 – 11 December 2021), also known as Manolo Santana, was a Spanish tennis player. He was ranked as amateur world No. 1 in 1965 by Ned Potter and in 1966 by Lance Tingay and Sport In The USSR.

He won the US Open in 1965 and, before winning Wimbledon the following year, he was quoted as saying "grass is just for cows", favouring artificial surfaces.

== Career ==
Santana was born in Madrid, and began his career as a ball boy and "picked up" the game. Santana took up tennis by chance after bringing a meal to his brother, who worked in a tennis club in Madrid. "I saw men in pants playing tennis. I was immediately charmed. I started as a ball boy, and then I started playing. In the end, I am an example of humility in an elitist world," he told newspaper El Español.

In 1965, Santana led Spain to unexpected victory over the U.S. in the Davis Cup, and he became a national hero. Despite his previous Grand Slam successes in the French Championships (1961, 1964) and the U.S. Championships (1965), Santana's win at the 1966 Wimbledon lawn tennis championships was a surprise, where he defeated the sixth seed Dennis Ralston in three straight sets. He also managed to attain the world number 1 ranking in 1965. His last big tournament win was in 1970 by winning Barcelona where he defeated Rod Laver. He also captured the doubles title in Barcelona that year when he teamed with Lew Hoad to defeat Laver/Andrés Gimeno.

Santana was named to the International Tennis Hall of Fame in 1984.

At the 1968 Olympic Games in Mexico City, Santana won the gold medal in singles, but tennis was only a demonstration sport at that time. It became a medal sport in 1988 (after another demonstration event in 1984).

Santana later was captain of the Spanish Davis Cup team twice, once in the 1980s and again for four and a half years in the mid-1990s, until he was dismissed in 1999. Until 2019, he was the organizer of the Madrid Masters.

Santana managed the Manolo Santana Racquets Club, a tennis club in Marbella, Spain and the Sport Center Manolo Santana, in Madrid.

Santana and Lleyton Hewitt are the only Wimbledon men's singles champions to lose in the first round in the following year; Hewitt's loss was to Ivo Karlović in 2003 during the Open era, while Santana's was to Puerto Rico and U.S. No. 1 Charlie Pasarell in 1967 in the last year before the Open era.

Santana appeared at the 2011 Wimbledon Championships in London in the Royal Box to watch the men's final, which was between his fellow countryman Rafael Nadal and Novak Djokovic.

In 2020, Santana was awarded the ITF Philippe Chatrier Award for his contribution to tennis, both on and off the court.

== Grand Slam performance timeline ==
Key
W	F	SF	QF	#R	RR	Q#	DNQ	A	NH

(W) winner; (F) finalist; (SF) semifinalist; (QF) quarterfinalist; (#R) rounds 4, 3, 2, 1; (RR) round-robin stage; (Q#) qualification round; (DNQ) did not qualify; (A) absent; (NH) not held; (SR) strike rate (events won / competed); (W–L) win–loss record.

Tournament	Amateur career										Open career					SR	W–L	Win%
Tournament	'58	'59	'60	'61	'62	'63	'64	'65	'66	'67	'68	'69	'70	/	'77	SR	W–L	Win%
Australian Open	A	A	A	A	A	A	A	A	A	A	A	A	A		A	0 / 0	0–0	00.00
French Open	A	A	QF	W	SF	SF	W	2R	A	A	A	4R	4R		A	2 / 8	35–6	85.36
Wimbledon	1R	3R	3R	2R	QF	SF	4R	A	W	1R	3R	A	A		A	1 / 10	26–9	74.28
US Open	A	2R	A	A	A	A	2R	W	SF	A	A	4R	4R		1R	1 / 7	20–6	76.92
Career	Results															4 / 45	95–41	69.85

== Grand Slam finals ==
=== Singles (4 titles) ===
Result	Year	Championship	Surface	Opponent	Score
Win	1961	French Championships	Clay	(Italy) Nicola Pietrangeli	4–6, 6–1, 3–6, 6–0, 6–2
Win	1964	French Championships (2)	Clay	(Italy) Nicola Pietrangeli	6–3, 6–1, 4–6, 7–5
Win	1965	U.S. Championships	Grass	(South Africa) Cliff Drysdale	6–2, 7–9, 7–5, 6–1
Win	1966	Wimbledon Championships	Grass	(United States) Dennis Ralston	6–4, 11–9, 6–4

=== Doubles (1 title) ===
Result	Year	Championship	Surface	Partner	Opponents	Score
Win	1963	French Championships	Clay	(Australia) Roy Emerson	(South Africa) Gordon Forbes (South Africa) Abe Segal	6–2, 6–4, 6–4

== Career finals ==
=== Singles titles (94) ===
(Incomplete roll)

	Year	Tournament	location	Surface	Opponent	Score
1	1958	Spanish International Championships	Madrid	Clay	(Venezuela) Isaías Pimentel	3-6 8-6 6-4
2	1959	Argentina International Championships	Buenos Aires	Clay	(Chile) Luis Ayala	6-2 7-5 2-6 9-7
3	1959	Catalonia Championships	Barcelona	?	(Spain) Alberto Arilla	7-5 6-4 7-9 6-2
4	1960	Spanish National Championships	Vigo	Clay	(Spain) José Luis Arilla	6-2 9-7 8-6
5	1960	North Spain Championships	Bilbao	Clay	(Spain) Emilio Martinez	6-3 4-6 6-3 6-1
6	1960	San Sebastián International	San Sebastián	Clay	(Italy) Giuseppe Merlo	6-3 7-5 6-4
7	1960	Moroccan International Championships	Casablanca	Clay	(Italy) Giuseppe Merlo	6-1 6-4 6-4
8	1961	Colombian International	Barranquilla	Clay	(Australia) Rod Laver	6-4 6-1 6-1
9	1961	French Championships	Paris	Clay	(Italy) Nicola Pietrangeli	4-6 6-1 3-6 6-0 6-2
10	1961	Lido Championships	Venice	Clay	(Italy) Fausto Gardini	7-5 5-7 6-4 1-6 10-8
11	1961	Lebanon International Championships	Beirut	Clay	(Australia) Fred Stolle	6-3 8-10 1-6 6-3 6-3
12	1961	Baden Baden International	Baden-Baden	Clay	(Chile) Luis Ayala	10-8 4-6 6-4 6-3
13	1961	North Spain Championships	Bilbao	Clay	(Australia) Barry Phillips-Moore	6-0 9-7 3-6 6-0
14	1961	Portuguese International Championships	Cascais	Clay	(United Kingdom) Billy Knight	6-0 6-2 6-2
15	1962	Mexican International	Mexico City	Clay	(Australia) Rod Laver	6-3 6-4 5-7 7-5
16	1962	Dixie International Championships	Tampa	Clay	(Brazil) Carlos Fernandes	3-6 6-1 8-6 6-2
17	1962	Puerta de Hierro International	Madrid	Clay	(Australia) Roy Emerson	5-7 6-4 9-7 6-8 6-4
18	1962	Trofeo Conde de Godó	Barcelona	Clay	(India) Ramanathan Krishnan	3-6 6-3 6-4 8-6
19	1962	International Swedish Hard Court Championships.	Båstad	Clay	(Sweden) Jan-Erik Lundqvist	4-6 5-7 6-4 7-5 6-3
20	1962	San Sebastián International	San Sebastián	Clay	(India) Ramanathan Krishnan	8-6 6-4 6-1
21	1963	Dixie International Championships	Tampa	?	(Australia) Fred Stolle	6-3 21-19
22	1963	Colombia International	Barranquilla	Clay	(Socialist Federal Republic of Yugoslavia) Boro Jovanović	6-1 6-4 6-3
23	1963	Caribe Hilton International	San Juan	?	(Australia) Roy Emerson	7-5 1-6 6-3 6-3
24	1963	Altamira International	Caracas	Clay	(Brazil) Thomaz Koch	9-11 7-5 6-1 6-4
25	1963	Masters Invitational	St. Petersburg	?	(Australia) Roy Emerson	6-4 6-4 6-8 3-6 6-3
26	1963	River Oaks Invitational	Houston	Clay	(United States) Chuck McKinley	6-4 13-11 3-6 2-6 6-4
27	1963	San Sebastián International	San Sebastián	Clay	(United Kingdom) Mike Sangster	6-2 6-2 6-4
28	1963	Catalonia Championships	Barcelona	Clay	(Brazil) José Edison Mandarino	6-3 6-2 6-0
29	1964	Copa Faulcombridge	Valencia	Clay	(Brazil) José Edison Mandarino	6-3 6-4 6-2
30	1964	Puerta de Hierro International	Madrid	Clay	(Mexico) Rafael Osuna	6-1 6-3 6-4
31	1964	French Championships	Paris	Clay	(Italy) Nicola Pietrangeli	6-3 6-1 4-6 7-5
32	1964	Colonel Kurtz Cup	Deauville	Clay	(Italy) Nicola Pietrangeli	2-6 6-3 2-6 6-2 6-2
33	1964	Baden Baden International	Baden-Baden	Clay	(Brazil) Ron Barnes	6-3 6-3
34	1964	Bavarian International Tennis Championships	Munich	Clay	(South Africa) Bob Hewitt	6-2 6-3 11-9
35	1964	Pacific Coast Championships	Berkeley	Hard	(France) Pierre Darmon	4-6 7-5 8-6 7-5
36	1965	Copa Faulcombridge	Valencia	Clay	(Colombia) Pato Alvarez	2-6 6-4 6-3 6-3
37	1965	Barbados International	Bridgetown	?	(Mexico) Rafael Osuna	6-3 6-4
38	1965	Dixie International Championships	Tampa	Clay	(Sweden) Jan-Erik Lundqvist	6-3 8-6 6-0
39	1965	Trinidad International	Port of Spain	Hard	(India) Ramanathan Krishnan	7-5 6-1 6-4
40	1965	Colombia International	Barranquilla	Clay	(India) Ramanathan Krishnan	6-2 9-7 6-3
41	1965	Mexican International	Mexico City	Clay	(India) Ramanathan Krishnan	6-3 6-3 4-6 9-7
42	1965	Caribe Hilton International	San Juan	Hard	(United States) Dennis Ralston	6-4 6-1
43	1965	Puerta de Hierro International	Madrid	Clay	(Spain) Juan Manuel Couder	6-1 4-6 0-6 6-4 6-3
44	1965	International Swedish Hard Court Championships.	Båstad	Clay	(Australia) Roy Emerson	6-1 6-1 6-4
45	1965	U.S. National Championships	Forest Hills	Grass	(South Africa) Cliff Drysdale	6-2 7-9 7-5 6-1
46	1965	Portuguese International Championships	Estoril	Clay	(Spain) José Luis Arilla	4-6 6-3 6-2 6-2
47	1965	Spanish National Championships	Barcelona	Clay	?	?
48	1966	Monte-Carlo Championships	Monte Carlo	Clay	(Italy) Nicola Pietrangeli	8-6 4-6 6-4 6-1
49	1966	Wimbledon Championships	London	Grass	(United States) Dennis Ralston	6-4 11-9 6-4
50	1966	Quebec Round Robin	Montreal	?	(South Africa) Cliff Drysdale	6-3 3-6 6-1
51	1967	South African Championships	Johannesburg	Hard	(Denmark) Jan Leschly	2-6 6-2 4-6 6-3 6-4
52	1967	Club du Lys International Tournament	Chantilly	Grass	(Australia) Roy Emerson	5-7 9-7 6-3 6-3
53	1967	Canadian Championships	Montreal	?	(Australia) Roy Emerson	6-1 10-8 6-4
54	1967	Mediterranean Games	Tunis	Clay	(Spain) Juan Gisbert	6-4 6-3 1-6 6-3
55	1967	Colonnial Tennis Classic	Fort Worth	?	?	?
56	1968	U.S. Pro Indoor	Philadelphia	Wood (i)	(Denmark) Jan Leschly	8-6 6-3
57	1968	Tampa Dixie International Invitation	Tampa	Clay	(Hungary) István Gulyás	6-4 7-5 6-4
58	1968	Puerta de Hierro International	Madrid	Clay	(United States) Herb Fitzgibbon	6-3 4-6 4-6 6-3 6-4
Open era
59	1968	West Berlin International Championships	Berlin	Clay	(Netherlands) Tom Okker	6-8 6-4 6-1 6-2
60	1968	Scandinavian Open	Helsinki	Clay	(Soviet Union) Toomas Leius	6-1 6-1 6-4
61	1968	Olympic Games Mexico	Guadalajara	Clay	(Spain) Manuel Orantes	2-6 6-3 3-6 6-3 6-4
62	1968	Spanish National Championships	Barcelona	Clay	(Spain) Manuel Orantes	6-4 3-6 6-2 6-2
63	1969	Copa Faulcombridge	Valencia	?	(South Africa) Robert Maud	6-2 2-6 6-4
64	1969	Barcelona De La Salud Tournament	Barcelona	Clay	(Spain) Manuel Orantes	7-5 6-2 6-2
65	1969	Puerta de Hierro Open	Madrid	Clay	(United States) Arthur Ashe	9-11 6-4 8-6 6-1
66	1969	Swedish Open	Båstad	Clay	(Romania) Ion Țiriac	8-6 6-4 6-1
67	1969	Portuguese Championships	Lisbon	Clay	(France) François Jauffret	6-1 6-0 6-2
68	1969	Austrian Open	Kitzbühel	Clay	(Spain) Manuel Orantes	6-4 6-2 6-3
69	1969	Trofeo Melia, Madrid International	Madrid	Clay	(Spain) Juan Gisbert	6-1 6-3 8-6
70	1969	Manly Seaside Championships	Sydney	Clay	(Australia) Ray Keldie	6-2 8-6
71	1970	Copa Faulcombridge	Valencia	Clay	(Spain) Manuel Orantes	7-5 1-6 4-6 6-3 6-3
72	1970	International Championships of Egypt	Cairo	Clay	(Soviet Union) Alex Metreveli	7-5 6-2 6-4
73	1970	Puerta de Hierro Open	Madrid	Clay	(Australia) Lew Hoad	6-3 8-10 6-3 6-0
74	1970	Andalusia Championships	Seville	Clay	(United States) Gene Scott	6-1 2-6 8-6 6-4
75	1970	Spanish Open	Barcelona	Clay	(Australia) Rod Laver	6-4 6-3 6-4
76	1971	Trofeo Conde de Godó	Barcelona	Clay	(United States) Bob Lutz	6-4 6-3 6-4
77	1971	Aragon Championships	Zaragoza	Clay	(West Germany) Harald Elschenbroich	6-4 6-4 8-6
78	1972	Grand Prix German Open	Hamburg	Clay	(Italy) Adriano Panatta	6-3 9-8 6-0
79	1975	Grand Prix German Open	Hamburg	Clay	(Czechoslovakia) Jan Kodeš	3-6, 6-2, 6-2, 4-6, 6-1
80	1976	Trofeo Gillette	Madrid	Clay	(United States) Eddie Dibbs	7-6, 6-2, 6-1

== Personal life ==
Santana was born in 1938, the son of a father imprisoned for his political beliefs during the early years of the Franco dictatorship. Santana married María Fernanda González-Dopeso in 1963; they had three children (Manuel, Beatriz and Borja). Their marriage ended in 1980. He also had a daughter outside his marriage, Barbara. In 1983, he married reporter Mila Ximénez, with whom he had a daughter, Alba. The divorce, in 1986, was unamicable. He also married (1990) and divorced (2008) Otti Glanzelius. He married Claudia Ines Rodriguez in 2013. The couple married in a private ceremony at the home of friends in Marbella.

== Death ==
Santana died on 11 December 2021, at the age of 83. The Madrid Open announced his death but not the cause.

Rafael Nadal reacted to his death by posting on Twitter,

"the only other Spanish man to win Wimbledon. We will miss you. Thank you a thousand times for what you have done for our country and for having opened the way for so many people. You have always been a point of reference, a friend and a person very close to everyone."

Spanish King Felipe VI also reacted by posting on Twitter,

"there are people who become legends and make a country great. Manolo Santana was and will always be one of them."

Spanish Prime Minister Pedro Sánchez lamented the loss of a "legend". He tweeted,

"my condolences to Manolo Santana's family, his loved ones and the tennis world."

== General sources ==
- Robertson, Max (ed.). Advisory editor: Kramer, Jack (1974). The Encyclopedia of Tennis. New York: Viking Press. ISBN 9780670294084.
