= Portuguese International Championships =

Defunct tennis tournament
- Event name: Portuguese International Championships
- Founded: 1901
- Abolished: 1973
- Location: Portugal
- Surface: Clay / outdoor

The Portuguese International Championships was a combined men's and women's clay court tennis tournament. It was held for the first time in 1901 in Cascais. When it was active, the tournament was Portugal's most prestigious tennis competition.

== History ==
The first edition was won by George Hillyard, who beat Clement Cazalet in the semifinals and Harold Mahony in the final. The first official international edition took place in 1902, and was won by George Gordon Dagge. In the next editions also less known players started to participate. The prestigious newspaper Tiro e Sport opened its pages to announce the third edition of the tournament, reporting: "It was with great anxiety that the results of these Championships were awaited, as, in addition to the old players, whose credits are already established, there were some relatively modern players and whose value was not at all known." The third international edition men's single tournament was won by the English R. Frazer, who defeated Dr. José Correia in the final. The same newspaper reported the next year that the competition was attended by the best Portuguese players and renowned foreign players. In 1905 the men's single tournament was won by Mr Lourdain (Jourdain). The first Portuguese to win the tournament was João de Sousa Macedo (Vila Franca) in 1907.

In the following decades, the tournament continued to be attended by prominent players. In 1932 the tournament was won by Marcel Bernard. Manuel Santana was crowned champion three times, in 1961, 1965 and 1969, while François Jauffret won the tournament twice, in 1968 and 1970.

The last edition, disputed in 1973, was won by José Edison Mandarino.

== Past finals ==
Past champions have included:

=== Singles ===
Year	Champions	Runners-up	Score
1901	(United Kingdom) George Hillyard	(United Kingdom) Harold Mahony	6–0, 6–4.
1902	(United Kingdom) George Gordon Dagge	(United Kingdom) R.W. Frazer	6–4, 6–2, 10–8.
1903	(United Kingdom) Robert Alexander Shore	(Portugal) George Gordon Dagge	6–2, 6–1, 5–7, 6–0.
1904	(United Kingdom) R.W. Frazer	(Portugal) José Correia de Sampaio	6–4, 6–2, 10–8.
1905	(United Kingdom) Frederick Nevill Jourdain	(United Kingdom) Edward Burford Morrison	6–2, 6–1, 6–3.
1906	(United Kingdom) Edgar Henry Hickie	(Portugal) Jose Mendes Almeida Bello	6–2, 6–4, 6–2.
1907	(Portugal) João de Sousa Macedo	?	?
1908	(Portugal) João de Sousa Macedo	(Portugal) D. Ricardo Borges de Sousa	6–2, 6–3, 6–1.
1909	(Portugal) João de Sousa Macedo	(Portugal) D. Ricardo Borges de Sousa	6–3, 7–5, 3–6, 6–2.
1910	Not held		
1911	?	?	?
1912	?	?	?
1913	(Portugal) João de Sousa Macedo	?	?
1914	?	?	?
1915	(Portugal) João de Sousa Macedo	?	?
1916	?	?	?
1917	?	?	?
1918	(Portugal) José de Verda	?	?
1919	?	?	?
1920	?	?	?
1921	(France) Jean Borotra	?	?
1922	(France) Jean Borotra	?	?
1923	?	?	?
1924	(Portugal) José de Verda	?	?
1925	(United Kingdom) Noel Turnbull	?	?
1926	(United Kingdom) Noel Turnbull	?	?
1927	(United Kingdom) Noel Turnbull	?	?
1928	(United Kingdom) Noel Turnbull	?	?
1929	(United Kingdom) Noel Turnbull	?	?
1930	(France) Pierre Henri Landry	(France) Emmanuel du Plaix	6–8, 1–6, 6–4, 6–1, 6–2.
1931	?	?	?
1932	(France) Marcel Bernard	(France) Pierre Henri Goldschmidt	?
1933	?	?	?
1934	(Portugal) Domingos d'Avillez	?	?
1935	(Portugal) Eduardo Ricciardi	?	?
1936	(Portugal) Eduardo Ricciardi	?	?
1937	?	?	?
1938	(Portugal) José Roquette	?	?
1939	(Portugal) José Roquette	?	?
1940	Not held		
1941	(France) Bernard Destremau	(France) Henri Pellizza	?
1942-45	?		
1946	(Italy) Francesco Romanoni	(Spain) Pedro Masip	6–2, 6–2, 6–3.
1947	(Spain) Pedro Masip	(France) Henri Cochet	6–2, 0–6, 5–7, 6–4, 9–7.
1948	(Belgium) Jacques Peten	(Netherlands) Robert Van Meegeren	4–6, 6–4, 6–1, 7–5.
1949	(Czechoslovakia) Milan Matouš	(Portugal) Joao Roquette Sr.	7–5, 6–4, 3–6, 6–3.
1950	?	?	?
1951	Not held		
1952	?	?	?
1953	?	?	?
1954	?	?	?
1955	(France) Robert Haillet	(Spain) Mario Castella	6–1, 6–3.
1956	?	?	?
1957	(Australia) Jack Arkinstall	(Spain) Juan Manuel Couder	6–1, 6–3, 5–7, 6–2.
1958	?	?	?
1959	(Australia) Donald William	(Peru) Oswaldo Olmedo	6–4, 6–2, 2–6, 6–0.
1960	(Wales) Mike Davies	(United Kingdom) Roger Becker	7–5, 6–2, 6–1.
1961	(Spain) Manuel Santana	(United Kingdom) Billy Knight	6–0, 6–2, 6–2.
1962	?	?	?
1963	(Mexico) Rafael Osuna	(United States) Donald Dell	7–5, 8–6, 6–4.
1964	(Spain) Juan Manuel Couder	(Colombia) William Álvarez	6–2, 6–3, 6–2.
1965	(Brazil) Ronald Barnes	(Japan) Osamu Ishiguro	6–1, 5–7, 11–9, 7–5.
1966	(Brazil) José Edison Mandarino	?	?
1967	(Spain) Juan Manuel Couder	(Chile) Jaime Pinto Bravo	6–1, 1–6, 6–1, 6–3.
1968	(France) François Jauffret	(United Kingdom) Bobby Wilson	6–4, 4–6, 6–3, 7–5.
1969	(Spain) Manuel Santana	(France) François Jauffret	6–1, 6–0, 6–2
1970	(France) François Jauffret	(Brazil) José Edison Mandarino	6–4, 6–1, 6–4.
1971	(Greece) Nicholas Kalogeropoulos	(Colombia) Jairo Velasco Sr.	6–1, 4–6, 6–1, 6–4.
1972	(Socialist Federal Republic of Yugoslavia) Boro Jovanović	(West Germany) Harald Elschenbroich	7–5, 6–1.
1973	(Brazil) José Edison Mandarino	?	?
