= Harald Elschenbroich =

German tennis player

- Country (sports): West Germany
- Residence: Berlin, Germany
- Born: 19 June 1941 (age 83); Mönchengladbach, Germany
- Plays: Right-handed

Singles
- Career record: 471-157
- Career titles: 30
- Highest ranking: No. 69 (2 March 1974)

Grand Slam singles results
- Australian Open: 3R (1975)
- French Open: 3R (1967)
- Wimbledon: 2R (1973, 1974)
- US Open: 2R (1964)

Doubles
- Career titles: 0

Grand Slam doubles results
- Australian Open: 2R (1976)
- Wimbledon: 2R (1967)

Team competitions
- Davis Cup: SF (1966)

Harald Elschenbroich (born 19 June 1941) is a former international tennis player from West Germany. He competed in the Davis Cup from 1965 to 1975, and in the Australian Open four times, from 1963 to 1977.

He won the Real Madrid International in 1971 defeating Manuel Santana in the semifinal and Juan Gisbert in the final.

He won the ATP Stuttgart Open in 1973 defeating Hans-Jürgen Pohmann in the final.

Elschenbroich won the 1977 Gottfried von Cramm Memorial Tournament defeating Bob Carmichael in the final.

== Career finals ==
=== Singles (2 runner-up) ===
Result	W–L	Date	Tournament	Surface	Opponent	Score
Loss	0–1	Aug 1972	Lisbon, Portugal	Clay	(Socialist Federal Republic of Yugoslavia) Boro Jovanović	5–7, 1–6
Loss	0–2	Jul 1978	Berlin, West Germany	Clay	(Czechoslovakia) Vladimír Zedník	4–6, 5–7, 2–6

=== Doubles (1 runner-up) ===
Result	W–L	Date	Tournament	Surface	Partner	Opponents	Score
Loss	0–1	Jun 1975	Düsseldorf, West Germany	Clay	(Austria) Hans Kary	(France) François Jauffret (Czechoslovakia) Jan Kodeš	2–6, 3–6
