= Caribe Hilton International =

Men's tennis tournament played at the Caribe Hilton in San Juan, Puerto Rico

Defunct tennis tournament
- Event name: Caribe Hilton Championships
- Tour: Pre open era
- Founded: 1953; 72 years ago
- Abolished: 1973; 52 years ago
- Location: Caribe Hilton Hotel, San Juan, Puerto Rico

The Caribe Hilton International also called the Caribe Hilton International Championships was a men's and women's tennis tournament played outdoors on hard courts from 1953 to 1973. The editions from 1971 to 1973 were known as the Caribe Hilton Invitational.

== History ==
The Caribe Hilton International was established in 1953 and was played at the Caribe Hilton Hotel, San Juan, Puerto Rico until 1968. The tournament was played outdoors on hard courts. The Caribe Hilton Championships was organized as part of a spring (March to May) Caribbean Circuit which included tournaments in Jamaica (Kingston International Invitation), Venezuela (Altamira International), Trinidad and Tobago (Trinidad International) and Colombia, Colombian International (Ciudad de Barranquilla). the tournament attracted the top players of the day. The 1971 and 1972 editions of the women's event was known as the Caribe Hilton Invitation.

== Finals ==
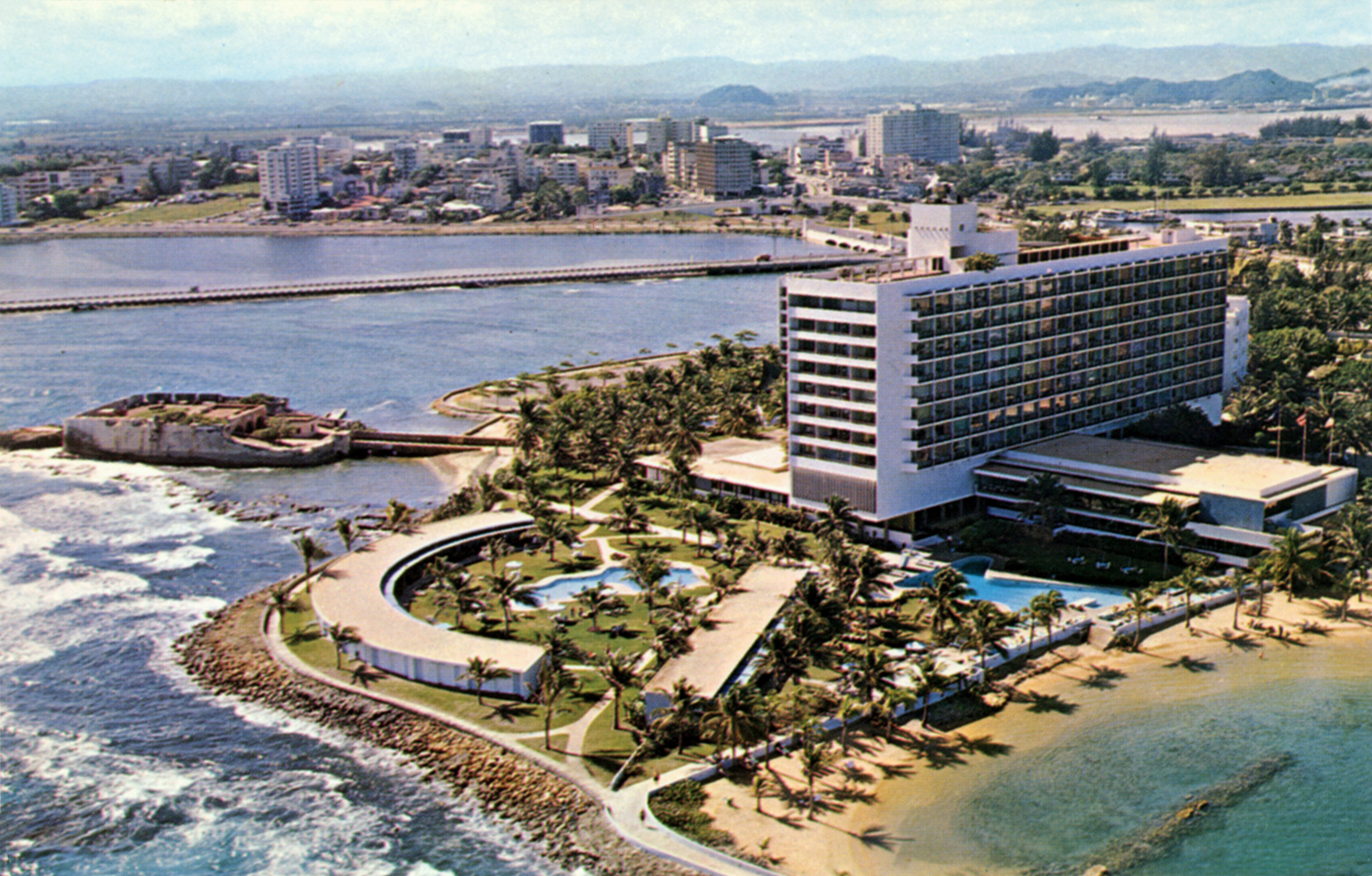
Caribe Hilton c.1960 tournament venue.

Included:

=== Men's singles ===
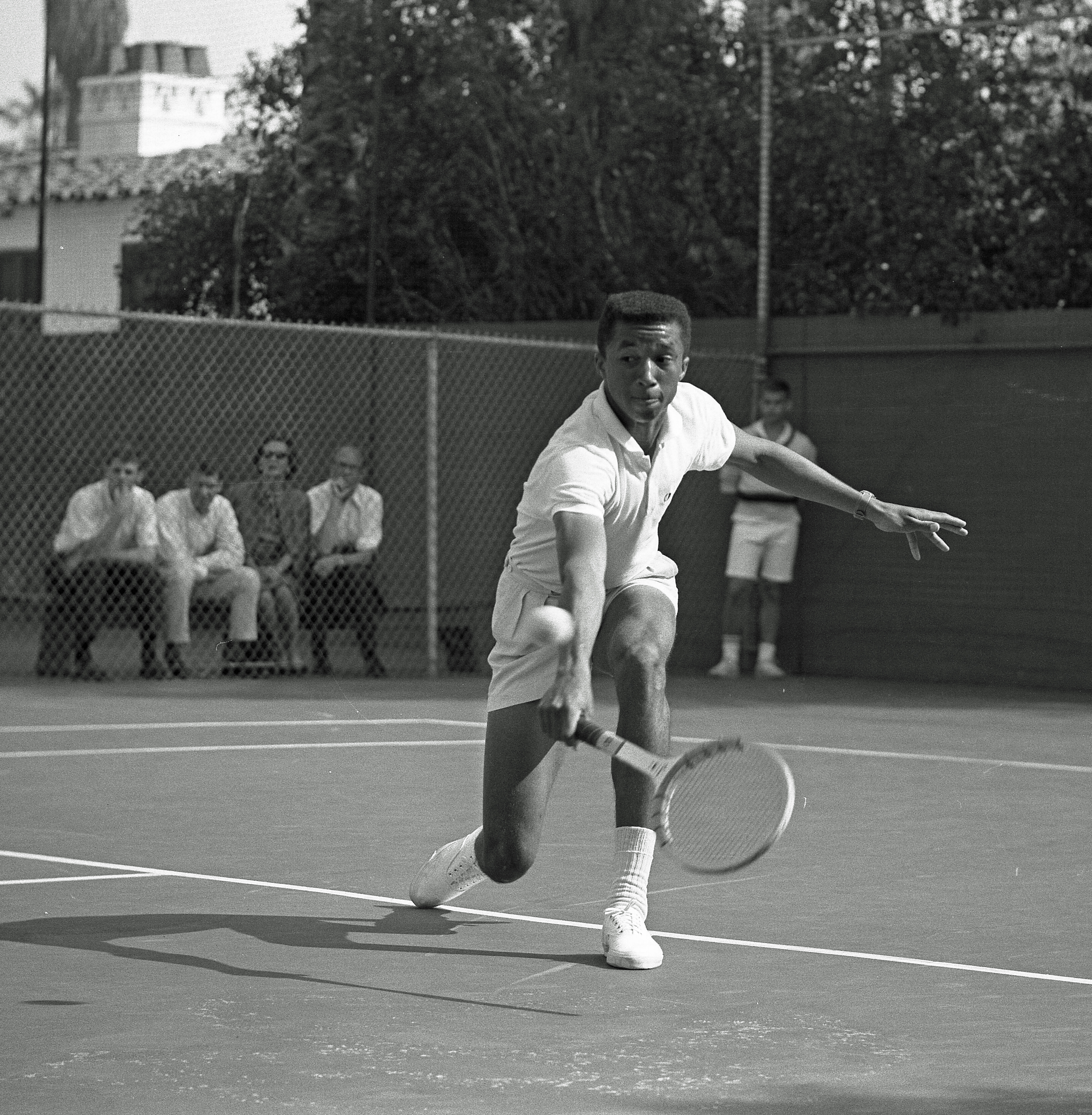
Arthur Ashe won 4 singles titles.

Note: Two editions of the men's tournament were held in 1968 the first in * January, the other in ** April.

Year	Champions	Runners-up	Score
Caribe Hilton International
1953	(United States) Art Larsen	(United States) Gardnar Mulloy	6–4, 6–4, 6–3
1954	(United States) Art Larsen (2)	(United States) Vic Seixas	12–10, 6–4, 6–4
1955	(United States) Tony Trabert	(United States) Vic Seixas	8–6, 5–7, 5–7, 7–5, 6–2
1956	(United States) Bernard Bartzen	(United States) Ham Richardson	6–2, 7–5, 6–2
1957	(United States) Vic Seixas	(Australia) Mervyn Rose	1–6, 6–1, 6–3, 6–4
1958	(United States) Budge Patty	(United States) Ham Richardson	7–9, 6–0, 6–2, 6–2
1959	(United States) Vic Seixas (2)	(Chile) Luis Alberto Ayala	4–6, 9–7, 6–3, 6–2
1960	(Australia) Roy Emerson	(Sweden) Ulf Schmidt	6–2, 6–1
1961	(Chile) Luis Alberto Ayala	(United States) Vic Seixas	5–7, 6–8, 6–2, 9–7, 6–0
1962	(Australia) Roy Emerson (2)	(Australia) Rod Laver	7–5, 7–5
1963	(Spain) Manuel Santana	(Australia) Roy Emerson	7–5, 1–6, 6–3, 6–3
1964	(Australia) Roy Emerson	(Mexico) Rafael Osuna	3–6, 8–6, 7–5, 6–2
1965	(Spain) Manuel Santana (2)	(United States) Denis Ralston	6–4, 6–1
1966	(United States) Arthur Ashe	(United States) Cliff Richey	6–3, 6–4, 6–3
1967	(Australia) Tony Roche	(United States) Charlie Pasarell	6–2, 6–4
Caribe Hilton Championship
1968 *	(United States) Arthur Ashe (2)	(United States) Ronald Holmberg	6–4, 6–4
Caribe Hilton International Championships
1968 **	(United Kingdom) Mark Cox	(United States) Allen Fox	6–2, 6–1, 4–6, 2–6, 6–2
↓ Open era ↓
1969	(United States) Arthur Ashe (3)	(United States) Charlie Pasarell	5–7, 5–7, 6–0, 6–4, 6–3
1970	(United States) Arthur Ashe (4)	(United States) Cliff Richey	6–4, 6–3, 1–6, 6–3
1971	(United States) Stan Smith	(United States) Cliff Richey	6–3, 6–3
Caribe Hilton Invitational Round Robin
1972	(United States) Stan Smith (2)	(United States) Clark Graebner	6–3, 6–3
1973	(Soviet Union) Alex Metreveli	(United Kingdom) Roger Taylor	6–4, 6–4, 0–6, 7–5

=== Women's Singles ===
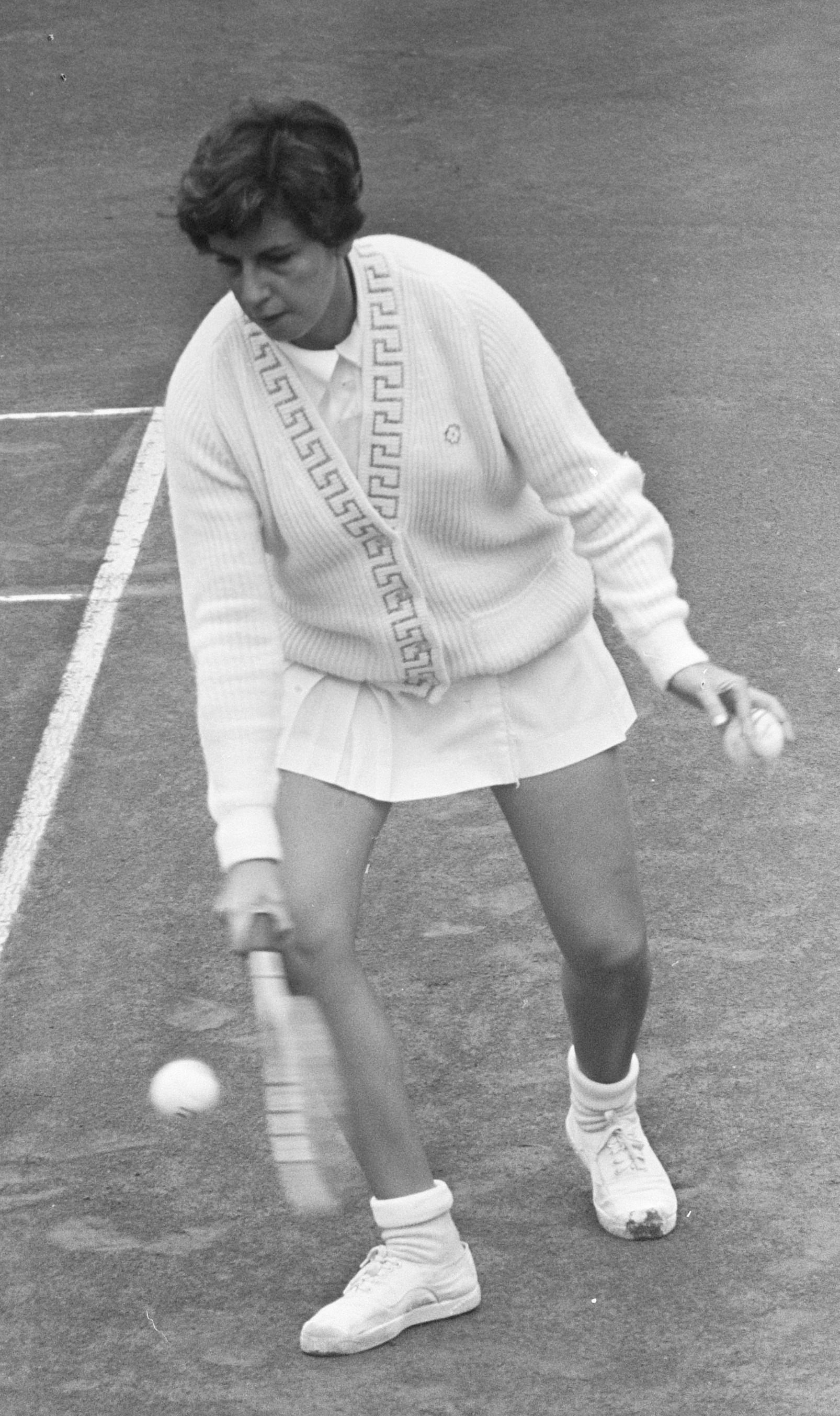
Maria Bueno won 1 singles title.

(incomplete roll)

Year	Winner	Runner-up	Score
Caribe Hilton International
1953	(United States) Doris Hart	(United States) Shirley Fry	6–1, 10–8
1954	(United States) Shirley Fry	(United States) Doris Hart	6–3, 6–3
1955	(United States) Darlene Hard	(United States) Dorothy Head Knode	6–1, 6–3
1956	(United States) Shirley Fry (2)	(United States) Mimi Arnold	3–6, 6–3, 6–4
1957	(United States) Dorothy Head Knode	(United States) Betty Rosenquest Pratt	8–6, 6–3
1958	(United States) Beverly Baker Fleitz	(United States) Althea Gibson	6–4, 10–8
1959	(United Kingdom) Christine Truman	(United States) Janet Hopps	6–2, 6–2
1960	(United Kingdom) Ann Haydon	(Brazil) Maria Bueno	4–6, 6–4, 6–4
1961	(Brazil) Maria Bueno	(United Kingdom) Ann Haydon	3–6, 6–4, 6–2
1962	(United States) Gwyneth Thomas	(Brazil) Maria Bueno	3–6, 6–2, 6–3
1963	(United States) Darlene Hard (2)	(United States) Gwyneth Thomas	6–4, 6–0
1964	(United States) Nancy Richey	(United States) Carol Hanks	6–3, 6–0
1965	(United States) Nancy Richey (2)	(Australia) Margaret Smith	6–8, 6–4, 9–7
Caribe Hilton Invitational
1966	(Argentina) Norma Baylon	(United States) Mary-Ann Eisel	6–3, 7–5
1967	(United Kingdom) Ann Haydon Jones (2)	(United Kingdom) Virginia Wade	7–5, 6–1
1968	(United States) Nancy Richey (3)	(United States) Kathy Harter	6–3, 6–4
↓ Open era ↓
1969	(Australia) Margaret Smith Court	(United States) Julie Heldman	6–4, 7–5
1970	(United States) Peaches Bartkowicz	(United States) Mary-Ann Eisel	6–1, 6–4
Caribe Hilton Championships
1971	(United Kingdom) Ann Haydon Jones (3)	(United States) Nancy Richey Gunter	6–4, 6–4
Caribe Hilton Invitational
1972	(United States) Nancy Richey Gunter (4)	(United States) Chris Evert	6–1, 6–3

=== Women's Doubles ===
Year	Champions	Runners-up	Score
Caribe Hilton Championships
1971	(France) Françoise Dürr (United Kingdom) Ann Haydon-Jones	(Australia) Karen Krantzcke (Australia) Kerry Reid	7–6, 6–3
Caribe Hilton Invitational
1972	(United States) Rosemary Casals (United States) Billie Jean King	(Australia) Karen Krantzcke (Australia) Judy Tegart	6–2, 6–3
