= British Colonial Hotel =

Hotel in Nassau, Bahamas

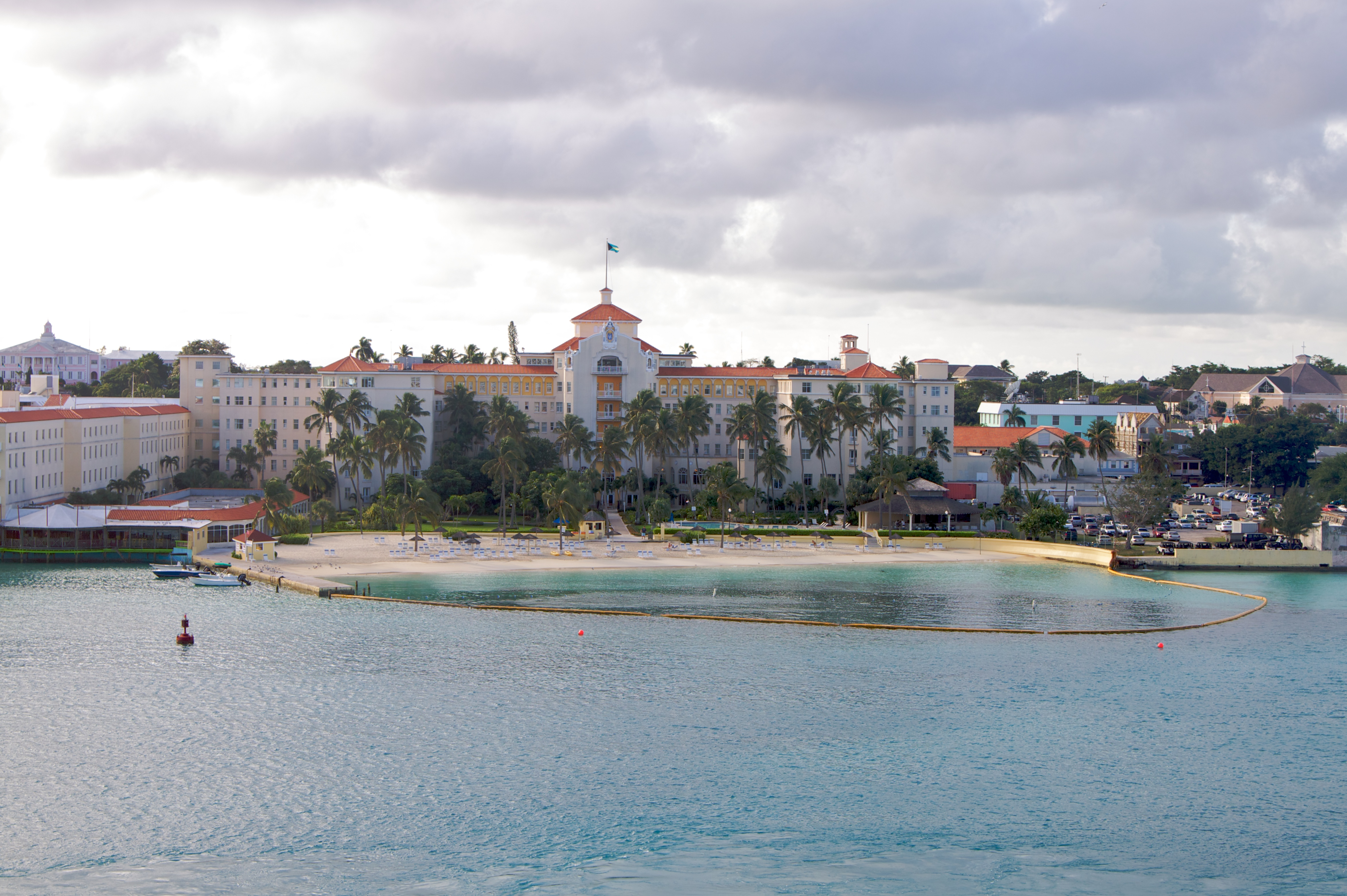
- Hotel from the bay

- Location within Bahamas

General information
- Location: 1 W Bay St, Nassau, Bahamas
- Coordinates: 25°4′42″N 77°20′44″W
- Opening: January 7, 1924
- Owner: China State Construction Engineering Corporation

Technical details
- Floor count: 7

Other information
- Number of rooms: 288
- Number of suites: 20

The British Colonial Hotel is a historic resort hotel in downtown Nassau, Bahamas, located on the only private beach in Nassau, on the site of the Old Fort of Nassau. The hotel, originally opened in 1924, has been described as "the Grand Dame of all Nassau hotels", "the most elegant and most expensive hotel in town", and "the most distinctive and pleasant of the island's large hotels".

== History of the area ==
The first permanent settlement was established on what is today Nassau in 1666, when it was known as Charles town. The shallow waters, numerous surrounding islands, and proximity to major shipping lanes made the location a haven for pirates, who came to control the settlement, eventually establishing a lawless Republic of Pirates. In 1697 a fort, known as Fort Nassau, was built to protect the harbor, on what is now the grounds of the British Colonial Hotel. In 1718 British forces, under the command of Governor Woodes Rogers, exerted control and eliminated most of the resident pirates with a combination of amnesties and hangings. Over the next two centuries, the town developed under British and American influence. In the 1880s, Greek emigration to develop the sponging industry brought more visitors and hotels. Fort Nassau remained in a state of disrepair for many years and was finally demolished in 1897. In the 1920s, Prohibition in the United States brought visitors for alcohol, and continued tourism.

== Hotel history ==
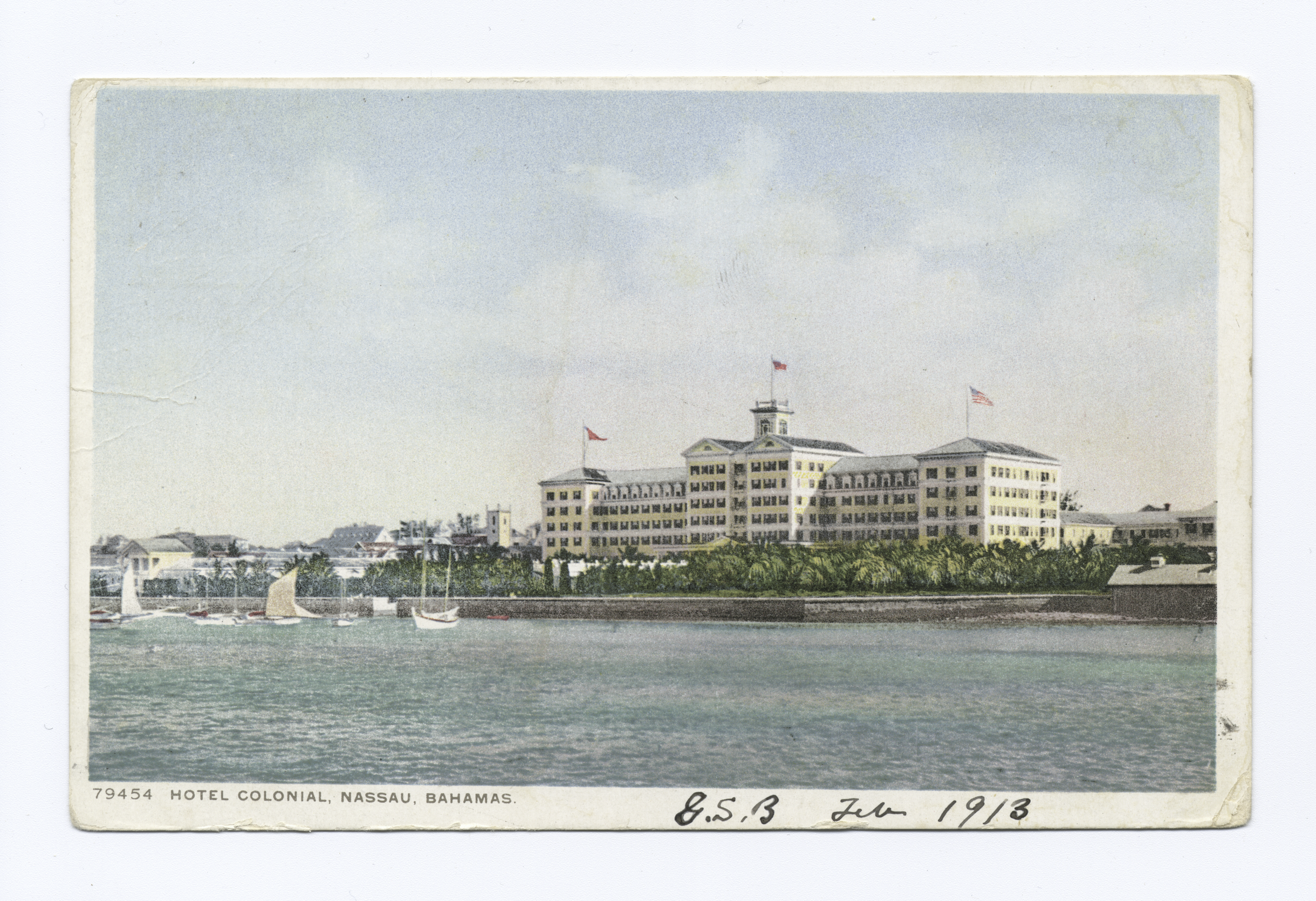
The Colonial Hotel, circa 1913

In 1900, the land was purchased by Henry M. Flagler, responsible for the Breakers Hotel in South Florida. He built an enormous hotel on the site, the Colonial Hotel, which opened in 1901. On March 31, 1922 the wooden hotel burned down. The Bahamian government gave a loan to the Munson Line, which purchased the land and built a brand new seven-story hotel, The New Colonial, on the site within six months. The hotel celebrated its grand opening on January 7, 1924.

In 1932, the hotel was purchased by Sir Harry Oakes. The local legend is that Oakes bought the hotel on a whim, after experiencing bad service there. Oakes renamed the hotel the British Colonial Hotel. He was a powerful man and a friend of the Duke of Windsor. He was later murdered in 1943 under mysterious circumstances (the mystery remains unresolved), which was called the "murder of the century".

The hotel was bought by Florida-based Gill Hotels in 1960 and became part of Sheraton Hotels in November 1962 as the Sheraton British Colonial, the chain's fourth ever franchise. Sheraton operated the hotel until 1988, when it became part of Best Western Hotels as the British Colonial Beach Resort. The old hotel building was gradually closed up over the course of the 1990s, with rooms eventually operating in only a small portion of the complex. Finally, in 1997 it was purchased by RHK, who renovated it at a cost of over $90 million. They completely gutted and modernized the interiors, but retained its façade of towers, galleries, and molded reliefs. The hotel reopened in October 1999, managed by Hilton Hotels, as the British Colonial Hilton Nassau. It was renovated in June 2009 at a cost of US$15 million,

The hotel was sold on October 24, 2014 to the China State Construction Engineering Corporation. From 2016-2019, the group constructed a $250 million complex, originally known as The Pointe, adjacent to the British Colonial, located on the hotel's former parking lot. The hotel and condominium towers of The Pointe have since been branded as Margaritaville Beach Resort Nassau.

The hotel closed temporarily in early 2020, due to the COVID-19 pandemic. It reopened on December 15, 2020, but closed again on February 15, 2022, due to continued low bookings during the ongoing pandemic from its clientele primarily of business and convention travelers. The hotel ceased to be associated with the Hilton brand as of that date.

While closed, the hotel underwent extensive renovations. It reopened as the British Colonial Hotel on December 19, 2023.

== Facilities ==
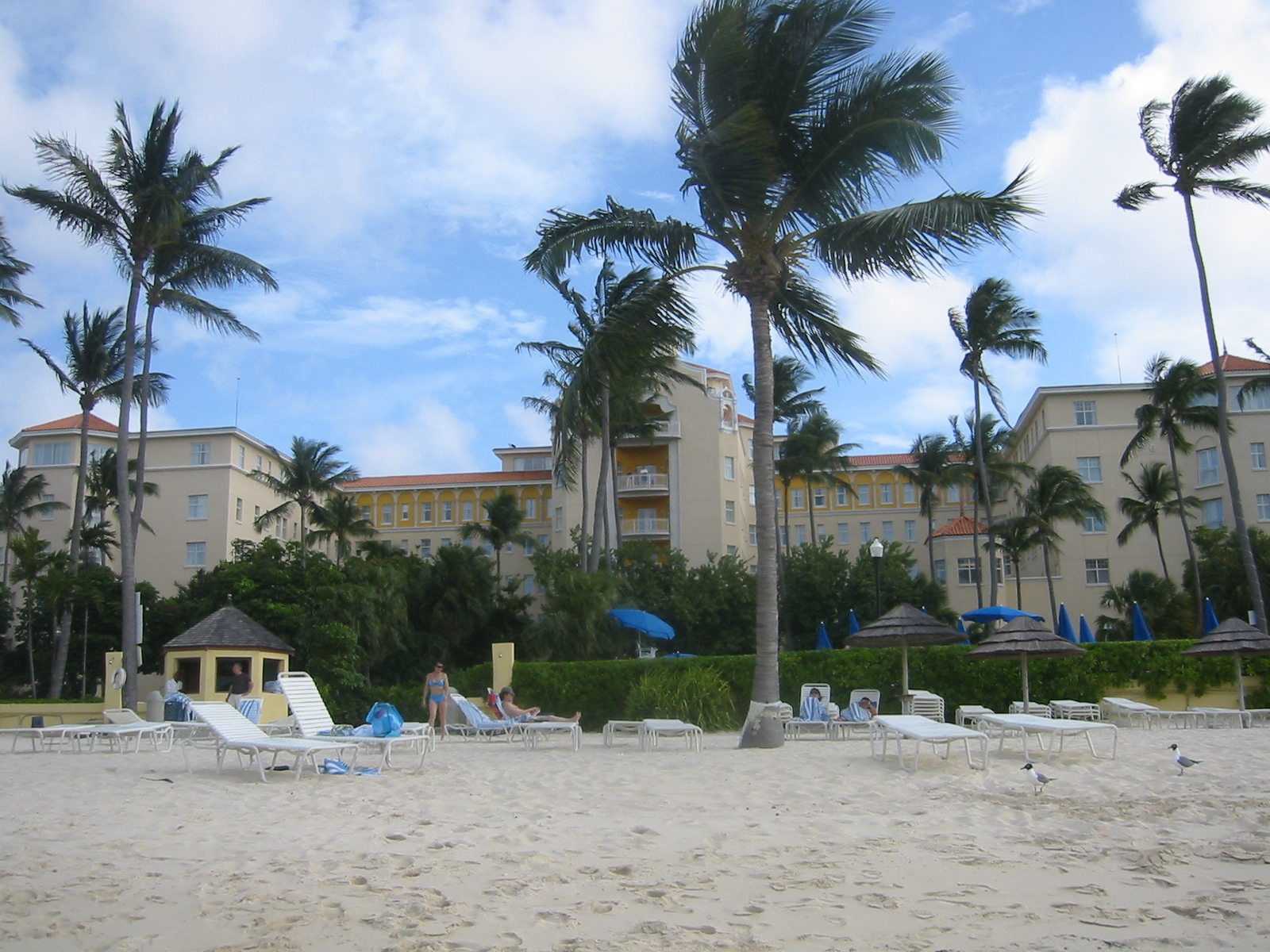
View from the hotel's private beach

The hotel has seven floors spread over an 8-acre plot and has 288 guest rooms, 20 suites and 47 executive-level rooms. On the north side of the hotel there is an expansive green space with palm trees, tropical plantings, a manicured lawn, and two outdoor swimming pools, all of which face the harbor. The area includes a variety of seating and lounging areas with cabanas, outdoor couches/cushioned areas, an outdoor cigar lounge, and a poolside bar and restaurant area. The pool and garden space leads down to a 300-foot-long private white sand beach which features kayaking and snorkeling. A gym occupies a separate building adjacent to the outdoor space.

As of late 2023, the hotel was fully modernised with new electronics and furnishings. The executive lounge is located on the top floor provided with 18,400 square feet (1,710 m^{2}) of space. The spacious lobby and elevator areas are floored with marble tile and all of the rooms are decorated in colonial décor. The hotel contains several dining options and a dark-mahogany wood tavern with vaulted ceilings. A relief depicting Christopher Columbus is situated high on the grand central tower of the hotel, and at the front of the hotel is a statue of Woodes Rogers, the ex-privateer who proved effective against piracy in the area. A mural depicting the history of the Bahamas was added in 1999 to the entrance hall.

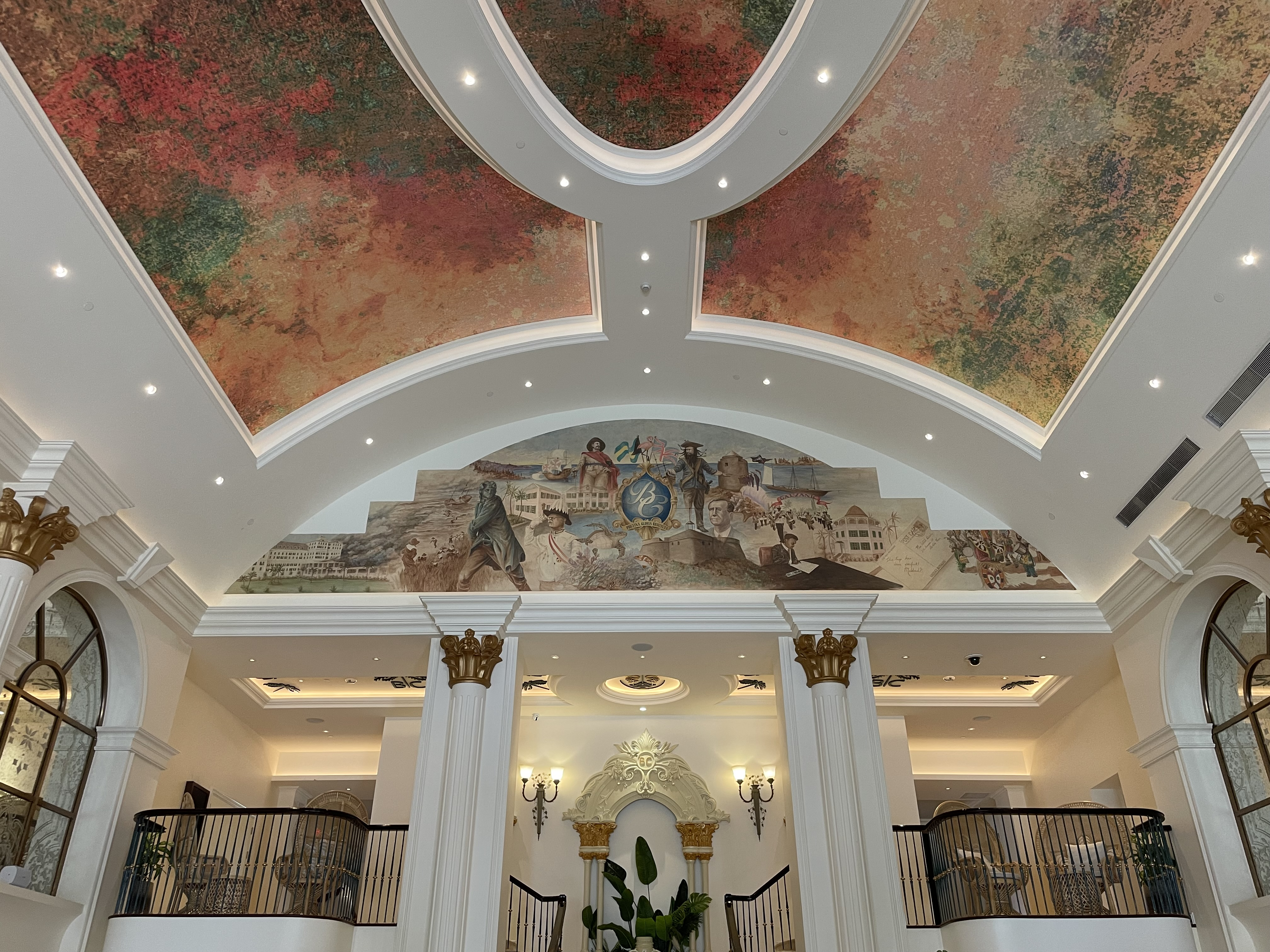
Mural in the entrance hall showing the history of the Bahamas, March, 2026

== James Bond ==
The hotel was used as a filming location for the 1983 James Bond film Never Say Never Again, starring Sean Connery. The character Fatima Blush (Barbara Carrera) waterskis in front of the resort and onto the end of the pier, into James Bond's arms, to the hotel’s old gazebo bar (located on the left of the picture in the infobox). The pier was especially built for the movie and the hotel kept it.

== See also ==
- Bahamas International Championships
