= Kingston International Championships =

Defunct tennis tournament
- Tour: ILTF Circuit
- Founded: 1932; 94 years ago
- Abolished: 1970; 56 years ago
- Location: Kingston, St. Andrews Parish, Jamaica
- Venue: The Liguanea Club; Sabina Park; St. Andrews Club
- Surface: Clay; Hard

The Kingston International Championships also known as the Kingston International Invitation and the St. Andrew International Invitation was a men's and women's clay court then later hard court tennis tournament established in 1932 as the Kingston International Tournament and first played at St. Andrews Club, then later Sabina Park, then at the Liguanea Club, Kingston, St. Andrews Parish, Jamaica until 1970.

== History ==
The Kingston International tournament was established in 1932 and first played at the St. Andrews Club, Kingston, Jamaica. It later moved to Sabina Park, Kingston, then later at the Liguanea Club, Kingston. In the 1960s the tournament was known as the St. Andrew International Invitation. In 1966 the first and only Jamaican tennis player to win the men's event was Richard Russell when he defeated Arthur Ashe in three sets. The tournament was part Caribbean Circuit which was a major feature of the international tennis scene in from the 1930s to early 1970s. The tournament was staged annually until 1970 when it was discontinued. In 1971 left with the lack of an international tournament in Kingston the Jamaica LTA in cooperation with Rothmans Pall Mall (Jamaica) Ltd launched a replacement event for this one. It was called the Rothmans of Jamaica Tennis Spectacular and was first played in December 1971 on indoor courts at the National Arena.

== Finals ==
=== Men's Singles ===
Incomplete roll

Results included:

Year	Champion	Runner-up	Score
1932	(United Kingdom) Fred Perry	(United Kingdom) Pat Hughes	6-2, 6-4
1934	(United States) George Martin Lott	(Canada) Marcel Rainville	6-2, 6–1, 6-2
1938	(United Kingdom) Fred Perry (2)	(United States) Ellsworth Vines	6-4, 6–4, 6-4
1951	(United States) Straight Clark	(United States) Jacques Grigry	6-0, 6–4, 6-1
1952	(United States) Dick Savitt	(United States) Budge Patty	9-7, 8-6
1953	(United States) Edward Moylan	(United States) Noel Brown	?
1954	(United States) Art Larsen	(United States) Gardnar Mulloy	4-6, 6–1, 6-2
1955	(United States) Art Larsen (2)	(United States) Herb Flam	6-2, 6-4
1956	(United States) Herb Flam	(United States) Vic Seixas	6-1, 7-5
1957	(Australia) Mervyn Rose	(Australia) Don Candy	2-6, 9–7, 6-2
1959	(Egypt) Jaroslav Drobný	(United States) Jon Douglas	8-6, 5–7, 6-3
1960	(Australia) Roy Emerson	(Australia) Neale Fraser	6-4, 6-2
1961	(Australia) Rod Laver	(Australia) Roy Emerson	4-6, 6–3, 6-4
1963	(Chile) Patricio Rodríguez	(United Kingdom) Michael Sangster	4-6, 7–5, 6-3
1966	(Jamaica) Richard Russell	(United States) Arthur Ashe	6-4 2-6 6-4
1967	(Australia) Tony Roche	(Socialist Federal Republic of Yugoslavia) Nikola Pilić	6-4, 6-4
Open era
1968	(Netherlands) Tom Okker	(Spain) Manuel Orantes	6-2, 6-4
1969	(Brazil) Thomaz Koch	(Czechoslovakia) Milan Holecek	6-2, 6-3
1970	(West Germany) Christian Kuhnke	(United Kingdom) Gerald Battrick	6-4, 6-0

=== Women's Singles ===
Incomplete roll

Year	Champion	Runner-up	Score
1952	(United States) Betty Rosenquest Pratt	(United States) Althea Gibson	6-2 6-4
1953	(United States) Shirley Fry	(United States) Doris Hart	3-6, 6–3, 6-3
1954	(United Kingdom) Helen Fletcher	(United States) Shirley Fry	6-1, 6-1
1955	(United States) Darlene Hard	(United States) Dottie Head Knode	6-1, 1–6, 6-3
1956	(United States) Shirley Fry (2)	(United States) Darlene Hard	5-7, 6–0, 7-5
1957	(United States) Darlene Hard (2)	(United States) Betty Rosenquest Pratt	6-2, 6-2
1959	(United States) Dottie Head Knode	(United Kingdom) Christine Truman	6-1, 4–6, 6-3
1960	(United Kingdom) Ann Haydon	(United States) Darlene Hard	6-2, 6-3
1961	(United States) Sally Moore	(United Kingdom) Christine Truman	1-0 retired
1963	(Australia) Lesley Turner	(United Kingdom) Deidre Catt	6-3, 6-1
1967	(France) Françoise Dürr	(United Kingdom) Ann Haydon Jones	6-3, 6–1.
Open era
