= Dixie International Championships =

Defunct tennis tournament
- Tour: ILTF Circuit
- Founded: 1925; 100 years ago
- Abolished: 1968; 57 years ago
- Location: Davis Islands, Tampa, Florida, United States
- Venue: Davis Islands Courts
- Surface: Clay

The Dixie International Championships or the Dixie Championships or the Dixie International or the Tampa Dixie International Invitation was a men's and women's international tennis tournament established in 1925 and was played on outdoor clay courts at the Davis Islands Tennis Club, Davis Islands, Tampa, Florida, United States until 1968. It was part of the South Florida-Caribbean tennis circuit during the 1960s.

== History ==
The Dixie International Championshipswere founded in 1925. The championships were last played on clay courts at the Davis Tennis Club, Davis Islands, Tampa, Florida, United States. The tournament was part Caribbean Circuit during the 1960s, which was a major feature of the international tennis scene from the 1930s to early 1970s.

== Finals ==
=== Men's Singles ===
Incomplete roll

Results included:

Year	Champion	Runner-up	Score
1925	(United States) Robert Kinsey	(United States) Douglas Watters	6-4, 7–5, 6-2
1926	(United States) Vinnie Richards	(United States) Frank Froehling	6-1, 9–11, 6-4
1935	(United States) Arthur Hendrix	(United States) Carroll Turner	6-3, 6–2, 6-4
1936	(United States) Bryan Grant	(United States) Martin Buxby	6-2, 6–2, 7-5
1937	(United States) Bryan Grant (2)	(United States) Don Budge	4-6, 6–3, 6–3, 2–6, 6-2
1938	(United States) Bobby Riggs	(United States) Wayne Sabin	6-3, 6–0, 7-5
1939	(United States) Wayne Sabin	(United States) Bryan Grant	6-3, 6–3, 6-1
1940	(United States) Bryan Grant (3)	(United States) Bobby Riggs	1-6, 6–2, 6–1, 3–6, 6-3
1941	(United States) Frank Kovacs	(United States) Edward Alloo	6-0, 6–3, 6-2
1942	(United States) Jack Kramer	(United States) Wayne Sabin	6-0, 6–0, 6-3
1946	(United States) Bill Talbert	(United States) Bryan Grant	6-3, 6–2, 6-1
1947	(United States) Bryan Grant (4)	(United States) Frank Guernsey	6-4, 6–3, 7-5
1948	(United States) Pancho Gonzales	(United States) Gardner Larned	2-6 3-6 6-2 7-5 6-2
1949	(United States) Gardnar Mulloy	(United States) Gardner Larned	1-6, 6–2, 6–3, 6-2
1950	(United States) Gardnar Mulloy (2)	(United States) Bryan Grant	6-1, 6–4, 6-2
1951	(United States) Gardnar Mulloy (3)	(United States) Ham Richardson	6-3, 9–7, 10–12, 3–2, ret.
1952	(United States) Tony Vincent	(United States) Grant Golden	6-4, 6–4, 7-5
1953	(United States) Gardnar Mulloy (4)	(United States) Bernard Bartzen	6-1, 3–6, 6–0, 6-1
1954	(United States) Gardnar Mulloy (5)	(United States) Tony Vincent	11-9, 8–6, 6-4
1955	(United States) Eddie Moylan	(United States) Bernard Bartzen	10-8, 6–4, 6-3
1956	(Brazil) Armando Vieira	(United States) Allen Morris	6-3, 6–3, 6–8, 14-12
1957	(Australia) Mervyn Rose	(Australia) Don Candy	6-3, 6–4, 3–6, 6-4
1958	(United States) Bernard Bartzen	(United States) Tony Vincent	6-0, 12–10, 6-1
1959	(United States) Eddie Moylan (2)	(Japan) Kosei Kamo	6-4, 6–4, 3–6, 6-4
1960	(United Kingdom) Mike Davies	(United States) Gardnar Mulloy	6-1, 0–6, 6–1, 6-4
1961	(United States) Whitney Reed	(United States) Gardnar Mulloy	4-6, 7–5, 5–7, 6–1, 9-7
1962	(Spain) Manuel Santana	(Brazil) Carlos Fernandes	3-6, 6–1, 8–6, 6-2
1963	(Spain) Manuel Santana (2)	(Australia) Fred Stolle	6-3, 21-19
1964	(Australia) Roy Emerson	(Spain) Manuel Santana	9-7, 6–2, 6-4
1965	(Spain) Manuel Santana (3)	(Sweden) Jan-Erik Lundqvist	6-3, 8–6, 6-0
1966	(South Africa) Cliff Drysdale	(Socialist Federal Republic of Yugoslavia) Boro Jovanović	6-2, 6–4, 6-4
1967	(Hungary) István Gulyás	(South Africa) Cliff Drysdale	3-6, 6–1, 2–6, 7–5, ret.
↓ Open era ↓
1968	(Spain) Manuel Santana (4)	(Hungary) István Gulyás	6-4, 7-5, 6-4

=== Women's Singles ===
Incomplete roll(* Final held indoors)

Year	Champion	Runner-up	Score
1926	(United States) Elizabeth Ryan	(United States) Mary Browne	6-3, 8-6
1940	(United States) Pauline Betz	(United States) Marta Barnett Andrade	6-2, 6-1
1941	(United States) Pauline Betz (2)	(United States) Sarah Palfrey Cooke	6–4, 6-3
1942	(United States) Pauline Betz (3)	(United States) Doris Hart	3–6, 6–3, 6-3
1946	(United States) Baba Madden Lewis	(United States) Betty Hulbert	6–4, 6-3
1947	(United States) Doris Hart	(United States) Barbara Scofield	3-6, 6–3, 6-4
1948	(United States) Doris Hart (2)	(United States) Magda Berescu Rurac	6-1, 6-3
1949	(United States) Nancy Morrison	(United States) Marta Barnett Andrade	6-3, 6-4
1950	(United States) Laura Lou Jahn	(United States) Marta Barnett Andrade	9-7, 1–6, 6-1
1951	(United States) Beverly Baker	(United States) Shirley Fry	6-4, 6-3
1952	(Romania) Magda Berescu Rurac	(United States) Laura Lou Jahn Kunnen	7-5, 6-1
1953	(United States) Shirley Fry	(Australia) Thelma Coyne Long	6-1, 6-3
1954	(United States) Laura Lou Jahn Kunnen	(United States) Evelyn Cowan	6-0, 6-3
1955	(United States) Shirley Fry (2)	(United States) Karol Fageros	9-7, 8-6
1956	(United States) Shirley Fry (3)	(United States) Dottie Head Knode	6-4, 3–6, 6-3
1957	(United States) Karol Fageros	(Mexico) Rosie Reyes	6-2, 6-2
1958	(Brazil) Maria Bueno	(United States) Laura Lou Jahn Kunnen	6-4, 6-1
1959	(United States) Laura Lou Jahn Kunnen	(Australia) Marie Martin	6-3, 8-6
1960	(United States) Sandy Warshaw	(United States) Laura Lou Jahn	6-3, 4–6, 6-4
1961	(United States) Carole Ann Prosen	(United States) Judy Alvarez	2-6, 6–3, 6-1
1962	(West Germany) Edda Buding	(United Kingdom) Elizabeth Starkie	6-1, 6-3
1963 *	(United States) Darlene Hard	(Australia) Lesley Turner	9-7, 1–6, 7-5
1964	(United States) Karen Hantze Susman	(United States) Judy Alvarez	6-4, 2–6, 6-4
1965	(United States) Tory Ann Fretz	(United States) Judy Alvarez	6–2, 6-1
1966	(Mexico) Elena Subirats	(United States) Alice Luthy Tym	6-1, 8-6
1967	(United Kingdom) Ann Haydon Jones	(France) Françoise Dürr	6–4, 8-6
↓ Open era ↓
1968	(United States) Helga Niessen	(Australia) Judy Tegart	2-6, 6–4, 6-1
