= Caribbean International Championships =

Defunct tennis tournament
- Tour: ILTF Circuit (1939-1963)
- Founded: 1939; 87 years ago
- Abolished: 1963; 63 years ago
- Location: Montego Bay, Jamaica (1939-1963)
- Venue: Fairfield Country Club
- Surface: Grass

Current champions
- Men's singles: (Brazil) Ronnie Barnes

The Caribbean International Championships was a tennis tournament held in Montego Bay, Jamaica (typically in March or early April) from the late 1930s to the 1963.

== History ==
The tournament was part of the early spring Caribbean Circuit. The event was often frequented by American players, but also had competitors from other parts of the world. The event was held every year in the 1950s but petered out in the 1960s.

== Finals ==
=== Men's singles ===
Year	Champions	Runners-up	Score
Jamaica (1939–1963)
1939	(United States) Elwood Cooke	(United States) Hal Surface	3–6, 4–5 rtd.
1950	(United States) Fred Kovaleski	(United States) Frank Guernsey	6–4, 6–4, 6–1
1951	(United States) Straight Clark	(United States) Jacque Grigry	6–0, 6–4, 6–1
1952	(United States) Dick Savitt	(United States) Budge Patty	6–4, 6–3
1953	(United States) Noel Brown	(United States) Edward Moylan	7–5, 4–6, 10–8, 6–1
1954	(United States) Art Larsen	(United States) Sven Davidson	7–5, 6–2
1955	(United States) Vic Seixas	(Chile) Luis Ayala	13–11, 6–4, 6–3
1956	(United States) Ham Richardson	(United States) Vic Seixas	8–6, 6–3, 6–2
1957	(United States) Vic Seixas (2)	(Brazil) Armando Vieira	4–6, 6–3, 6–0, 6–4
1958	(Australia) Mervyn Rose	(Chile) Luis Ayala	9–7, 6–4, 3–6, 2–6, 6–3
1959	(Chile) Luis Ayala	(Egypt) Jaroslav Drobný	19–17, 10–8, 6–3
1960	(Australia) Roy Emerson	(Australia) Neale Fraser	6–3, 6–4, 6–2
1961	(United States) Vic Seixas (3)	(United States) Whitney Reed	6–4, 6–2, 10–8
1962	(Australia) Roy Emerson (2)	(Australia) Rod Laver	8–6, 7–5, 4–6, 3–6, 6–2
1963	(Brazil) Ronnie Barnes	(Socialist Federal Republic of Yugoslavia) Nikola Pilic	7–5, 6–1, 6–2

=== Women' Singles ===
Year	Champions	Runners-up	Score
Jamaica (1939–1963)
1951	(United States) Althea Gibson	(United States) Betty Rosenquest	6–4, 6–2
1953	(United States) Doris Hart	(United States) Shirley Fry	6–4, 3–6, 6–4
1954	(United States) Shirley Fry	(United Kingdom) Helen Fletcher	6–3, 7–5
1955	(United States) Darlene Hard	(United States) Dorothy Head Knode	6–1, 1–6, 6–3
1956	(United States) Shirley Fry (2)	(United States) Louise Brough	6–4, 4–6, 6–3
1957	(United States) Darlene Hard (2)	(United States) Dorothy Head Knode	6–2, 6–2
1958	(United States) Althea Gibson (2)	(Brazil) Maria Bueno	6–1, 6–3
1959	(United Kingdom) Christine Truman	(United States) Janet Hopps	6–2, 4–6, 6–4
1960	(United Kingdom) Ann Haydon	(United States) Donna Floyd	6–4, 6–2
1961	(United Kingdom) Ann Haydon (2)	(Australia) Lesley Turner	6–4, 6–1
1962	(Australia) Jan Lehane	(Australia) Lesley Turner	6–3, 6–2
1963	(Australia) Lesley Turner	(South Africa) Renée Schuurman	6–3, 6–1

== See also ==
- Category:National and multi-national tennis tournaments
